= Yaroslav Karpushin =

Russian motorcycle racer (born 2009)

Yaroslav Karpushin Ярослав Карпушин
- Born: 11 November 2009 (age 16); Moscow, Russia
- Current team: Aspar Team
- Bike number: 17
Statistics
Moto3 Junior World Championship
Active years	2026–
Championships	0
Manufacturer	CFMoto (2026–)
Starts / Wins / Podiums / Poles / F. laps / Points; 12 / 1 / 7 / 0 / 0 / 172

Yaroslav Karpushin (Russian: Ярослав Карпушин; born 11 November 2009) is a Russian motorcycle racer competing in the FIM Moto3 Junior World Championship with Aspar Team, as well as the Red Bull MotoGP Rookies Cup. Born in Russia, he competes under a Kyrgyzstani racing license.

== Career ==
=== Early career ===
Born in Moscow, Russia, Karpushin began riding motorcycles at the age of four, having previously participated in balance bike races. He trained with small frame motorcycles like the Yamaha PW50 and other minibikes.

Karpushin started competing in Spanish and Italian minibike championships from 2016 onwards. In 2018, aged nine, he participated in the Spanish Dani Rivas Cup where he finished in third place overall, winning the double header in the final round at the Zuera karting track. He also became Russian minibike champion for a third time in a row.

In 2019, Karpushin competed in the Copa España de Minivelocidad where he finished tenth overall, picking up a podium with a third place finish in wet conditions in the final round, at the Correcaminos karting circuit. Karpushin remained in the Copa España de Minivelocidad in 2020, in the MiniGP 110 class, where he clinched another third place in the final race. In 2021, Karpushin entered the Moto4 class of the Spanish Superbike Championship with Austin Racing VHC, and Beñat Fernández as teammate, where he finished sixth overall. In 2022, he would remain in the category for a second year, where he won his first race, and finished on the podium on three more occasions.

=== European Talent Cup and Moto3 Junior ===
Following several podiums finishes in the Moto4 Spanish Superbike Championship, Karpushin competed in the second half of the 2024 European Talent Cup season with Frando Racing. In his debut round at Jerez, Karpushin finished in 11th place in his first race, followed by an eighth position in Race 2. He finished the season in 21st place. After a good impression in 2024, Karpushin was signed to race full-time in 2025 with Frando Racing. In his first full season Karpushin clinched two podium finishes in the cup at Jerez and Aragon, having started from 23rd on the grid in the latter. During the penultimate round at Barcelona, he clinched another podium but was later disqualified due to a technical infringement.

In December 2025, Aspar Team announced Karpushin would compete in the 2026 FIM Moto3 Junior World Championship with them aboard a CFMoto.

=== Red Bull MotoGP Rookies Cup ===
During the 2025 Red Bull MotoGP Rookies Cup selection event held in October 2024, Karpushin was one of the eight new selectees for the 2025 season. In his rookie season in the cup, Karpushin claimed consistent result across the first six races. In the Sachsenring round, he set pole position and finished third in Race 2, clinching his maiden Rookies Cup podium. He closed the season with three more top-ten results and finished 12th overall. In the opening round of the 2026 season at Jerez, Karpushin clinched his second cup podium following a second place finish.

== Career statistics ==
=== European Talent Cup ===
==== Races by year ====
(key) (Races in bold indicate pole position; races in italics indicate fastest lap)

Year	Bike	1	2	3	4	5	6	7	8	9	10	11	Pos	Pts
2024	Honda	MIS1	MIS2	EST1	EST2	BAR	ALG	JER1; 11	JER2; 8	ARA1; 23	ARA2; 13	EST; WD	21st	16
2025	Honda	EST1; 12	EST2; 6	JER1; 21	JER2; 3	MAG1; Ret	MAG2; 12	ARA; 3	MIS1; 4	MIS2; 7	CAT; DSQ	VAL; 4	6th	85

=== Red Bull MotoGP Rookies Cup ===
==== Races by year ====
(key) (Races in bold indicate pole position; races in italics indicate fastest lap)

Year	Bike	1		2		3		4		5		6		7		Pos	Pts
Year	Bike	R1	R2	R1	R2	R1	R2	R1	R2	R1	R2	R1	R2	R1	R2	Pos	Pts
2025	KTM	JER; Ret	JER; 11	LMS; 14	LMS; 12	ARA; 7	ARA; 6	MUG; 18	MUG; 6	**SAC**; 13	**SAC**; 3	RBR; 10	RBR; 10	MIS; Ret	MIS; 9	12th	78
2026	KTM	JER; 23	JER; 2	LMS; 19	LMS; 17	MUG; 7	MUG; 13	ASS; 9	ASS; 10	SAC; 6	SAC; 2	MIS; Ret	MIS; 6	RBR; Ret	RBR; 17	11th	85

=== FIM Moto3 Junior World Championship ===
==== Races by year ====
(key) (Races in bold indicate pole position; races in italics indicate fastest lap)

Year	Bike	1	2	3	4	5	6	7	8	9	10	11	12	Pos	Pts
2026	CFMoto	CAT1; Ret	CAT2; 9	EST; 12	JER1; 2	JER2; 1	MAG; 4	VAL1; 2	VAL2; 2	ARA1; 5	ARA2; 3	MIS1; 2	MIS2; 3	2nd	172
