= Leo Rammerstorfer =

Austrian motorcycle racer (born 2004)

- Rammerstorfer at the 2026 Czech Grand Prix
- Nationality: Austrian
- Born: 13 August 2004 (age 22); Linz, Austria
- Current team: Sic58 Squadra Corse
- Bike number: 5
Motorcycle racing career statistics
Moto3 World Championship
Active years	2026–
Manufacturers	Honda
Starts / Wins / Podiums / Poles / F. laps / Points; 17 / 0 / 0 / 0 / 0 / 2

Leo Rammerstorfer (born 13 August 2004) is an Austrian Grand Prix motorcycle racer who competes in the Moto3 World Championship for Sic58 Squadra Corse. He is contracted to join LevelUp – MTA for the 2027 season.

== Career ==
=== Early career ===
Rammerstorfer was born in Linz, Austria. He began racing in the IDM Supersport 300 championship, where he rode for the Freudenberg team. In 2021, he dominated the newly created Austrian Junior Cup, securing the title. The following year, he narrowly missed the IDM Supersport 300 title with the Freudenberg KTM team, finishing as runner-up. He took his first podium at the Red Bull Ring and ended his IDM Supersport 300 campaign with three wins and three further podium finishes.

For 2023, Rammerstorfer was selected from more than a hundred candidates to join the Red Bull MotoGP Rookies Cup. He competed in the series for three seasons, also racing in the FIM JuniorGP World Championship in parallel. In 2025, his strongest season, he achieved a best finish of fourth place at Magny-Cours in JuniorGP and a fifth place at Aragón in the Rookies Cup. He finished the 2025 Rookies Cup in 13th place and the JuniorGP in 14th, with several top-ten results.

=== Moto3 World Championship ===
==== SIC58 Squadra Corse (2026) ====
On 10 January 2026, Sic58 Squadra Corse announced that Rammerstorfer would make his Grand Prix debut in the 2026 Moto3 World Championship, taking the seat originally intended for the injured Noah Dettwiler and partnering Casey O'Gorman. He scored his first World Championship points with a 14th-place finish at the French Grand Prix.

==== LevelUp – MTA (2027–) ====
In September 2026, LevelUp – MTA confirmed Rammerstorfer as part of its rider line-up for the 2027 season, alongside Beñat Fernández.

== Career statistics ==
=== European Talent Cup ===
==== Races by year ====
(key) (Races in bold indicate pole position; races in italics indicate fastest lap)

Year	Bike	1	2	3	4	5	6	7	8	9	10	11	Pos	Pts
2022	Honda	EST	EST	VAL	VAL	BAR	JER	JER	ALG; DNQ	ARA; 23	ARA; 23	VAL; DNQ	40th	0

=== Red Bull MotoGP Rookies Cup ===
==== Races by year ====
(key) (Races in bold indicate pole position; races in italics indicate fastest lap)

Year	Bike	1		2		3		4		5		6		7		Pos	Pts
Year	Bike	R1	R2	R1	R2	R1	R2	R1	R2	R1	R2	R1	R2	R1	R2	Pos	Pts
2023	KTM	ALG; 22	ALG; 18	JER; 21	JER; 20	LMS; 20	LMS; 14	MUG; Ret	MUG; 17	ASS; 17	ASS; 17	RBR; 21	RBR; Ret	MIS; Ret	MIS; 21	25th	2
2024	KTM	JER; Ret	JER; 16	LMS; 12	LMS; 15	MUG; Ret	MUG; 14	ASS; 19	ASS; 14	RBR; 7	RBR; 10	ARA; 12	ARA; 13	MIS; 14	MIS; 17	17th	33
2025	KTM	JER; 11	JER; 8	LMS; 7	LMS; 7	ARA; Ret	ARA; 5	MUG; 4	MUG; 11	SAC; Ret	SAC; Ret	RBR; 11	RBR; 7	MIS; 12	MIS; Ret	13th	78

=== FIM JuniorGP World Championship ===
==== Races by year ====
(key) (Races in bold indicate pole position; races in italics indicate fastest lap)

Year	Bike	1	2	3	4	5	6	7	8	9	10	11	12	Pos	Pts
2023	Husqvarna	EST; 16	VAL1; 19	VAL2; 13	JER1; 15	JER2; 19	ALG1; 18	ALG2; 17	BAR1; 20	BAR2; Ret	ARA; 14	VAL1; 12	VAL2; Ret	22nd	10
2024	Husqvarna	MIS1; 12	MIS2; 20	EST; 11	BAR1; 13	BAR2; 8	ALG1; 26	ALG2; 14	JER1; 12	JER2; Ret	ARA; 16	EST1; 9	EST2; 14	17th	35
2025	KTM	EST; 10	JER1; 10	JER2; 16	MAG; 4	ARA1; 19	ARA2; 13	MIS1; 13	MIS2; 13	BAR1; 29	BAR2; 14	VAL1; Ret	VAL2; 14	14th	38

=== Grand Prix motorcycle racing ===
==== By season ====
Season	Class	Motorcycle	Team	Race	Win	Podium	Pole	FLap	Pts	Plcd
2026	Moto3	Honda	Sic58 Squadra Corse	18	0	0	0	0	2*	26th*
Total				**18**	**0**	**0**	**0**	**0**	**2**	

==== By class ====
Class	Seasons	1st GP	1st pod	1st win	Race	Win	Podiums	Pole	FLap	Pts	WChmp
Moto3	2026–present	2026 Thailand			18	0	0	0	0	2	0
Total	2026–present				**18**	**0**	**0**	**0**	**0**	**2**	**0**

==== Races by year ====
(key) (Races in bold indicate pole position; races in italics indicate fastest lap)

Year	Class	Bike	1	2	3	4	5	6	7	8	9	10	11	12	13	14	15	16	17	18	19	20	21	22	Pos	Pts
2026	Moto3	Honda	THA; 16	BRA; Ret	USA; 20	SPA; DNS	FRA; 14	CAT; 22	ITA; 23	HUN; 19	CZE; Ret	NED; 17	GER; 16	GBR; 17	ARA; 17	RSM; Ret	AUT; 20	JPN; Ret	INA; Ret	AUS; C	MAL; 18	QAT	POR	VAL	26th*	2*

* Season still in progress.
