= Fernando Bujosa =

Spanish motorcycle racer (born 2009)

- Born: 7 July 2009 (age 17); Palma de Mallorca, Spain
- Bike number: 69
Statistics
Moto3 Junior World Championship
Active years	2026
Championships	0
Manufacturer	KTM
Team(s)	AC Racing Team
Last season (2026)	4th (151 pts)
Starts / Wins / Podiums / Poles / F. laps / Points; 12 / 3 / 7 / 1 / 0 / 151

Fernando Bujosa García (born 7 July 2009), also known as Fer Bujosa, is a Spanish motorcycle racer from Palma de Mallorca. He is the European Talent Cup champion of 2025 and is set to make his Grand Prix motorcycle racing debut in the Moto3 class in 2027 with Intact GP.

== Career ==
=== Early career ===
Bujosa began his racing career in the Spanish ESBK Championship, competing in the Moto4 and PreMoto3 categories.

=== European Talent Cup ===
Bujosa made his debut in the European Talent Cup halfway through the 2022 season, just after turning 13, and immediately impressed with a sixth-place finish in only his second race. After a full-time season with Estrella Galicia 0,0 in 2024, where he finished 17th in the standings, Bujosa joined the AC Racing Team for 2025. The 2025 season proved to be a breakthrough year for Bujosa. He won the opening race of the season in Jerez, followed by two more victories at Magny-Cours and Aragón, along with several other podium finishes. Despite leading the championship heading into the penultimate round, a crash in Catalunya meant he arrived at the final round in Valencia in second place, behind leader Carlos Cano.

In the final race, Bujosa finished third, which mathematically ended his chances for the title. However, his rival Cano was disqualified from the race due to a technical infringement, handing the championship to Bujosa.

=== Red Bull MotoGP Rookies Cup and Moto3 Junior ===
In October 2025, Bujosa was one of the riders selected for the 2026 Red Bull MotoGP Rookies Cup. He won Race 1 at Misano after a dramatic last-lap pass, and followed it up with another victory at the Red Bull Ring in Austria. He finished the season as runner-up in the championship, narrowly missing the title to Beñat Fernández.

Parallel to his Rookies Cup campaign, Bujosa also competed in the FIM Moto3 Junior World Championship in 2026, making the step with his European Talent Cup team AC Racing. He won the final three races of the season at Aragón and Misano, and finished the championship in fourth place overall.

=== Moto3 World Championship ===
On 8 October 2026, it was announced that Bujosa had signed a contract with Intact GP to race in the Moto3 World Championship for the 2027 season, alongside Jesús Ríos. He was granted an early World Championship entry, one year before the minimum age of 18, due to his top-three finish in the 2026 Red Bull Rookies Cup.

== Career statistics ==
=== European Talent Cup ===
==== Races by year ====
(key) (Races in bold indicate pole position; races in italics indicate fastest lap)

Year	Bike	1	2	3	4	5	6	7	8	9	10	11	Pos	Pts
2022	Honda	EST	EST	VAL	VAL	BAR	JER	JER	ALG; DNQ	ARA; 6	ARA; 12	VAL; 23	23rd	14
2023	Honda	EST	EST	VAL	VAL	JER	JER	ALG	BAR; Ret	ARA; 23	ARA; 22	VAL; 13	28th	3
2024	Honda	MIS; Ret	MIS; Ret	EST; 3	EST; 7	BAR; Ret	ALG; 17	JER; 14	JER; Ret	ARA; 12	ARA; 28	EST; Ret	17th	31
2025	Honda	EST1; 1	EST2; DSQ	JER1; 2	JER2; Ret	MAG1; 4	MAG2; 1	ARA; 1	MIS1; 3	MIS2; 2	CAT; Ret	**VAL**; 3	1st	160

=== Red Bull MotoGP Rookies Cup ===
==== Races by year ====
(key) (Races in bold indicate pole position; races in italics indicate fastest lap)

Year	Bike	1		2		3		4		5		6		7		Pos	Pts
Year	Bike	R1	R2	R1	R2	R1	R2	R1	R2	R1	R2	R1	R2	R1	R2	Pos	Pts
2026	KTM	JER; 2	JER; 5	LMS; 4	LMS; 2	MUG; Ret	MUG; 11	ASS; 5	ASS; 6	SAC; 9	SAC; Ret	MIS; 1	MIS; 4	RBR; 1	RBR; 6	2nd	170

=== FIM Moto3 Junior World Championship ===
==== Races by year ====
(key) (Races in bold indicate pole position; races in italics indicate fastest lap)

Year	Bike	1	2	3	4	5	6	7	8	9	10	11	12	Pos	Pts
2026	KTM	**CAT1**; Ret	**CAT2**; 3	EST; 8	JER1; 3	JER2; Ret	MAG; 2	VAL1; Ret	VAL2; 3	ARA1; 25	ARA2; 1	MIS1; 1	MIS2; 1	4th	151
