= 2026 Red Bull MotoGP Rookies Cup =

Motorcycle racing competition

2026 Red Bull MotoGP Rookies Cup
| Previous: | 2025 | Next: | 2027 |

The 2026 Red Bull Rookies Cup was the twentieth season of the Red Bull MotoGP Rookies Cup and fourteenth year contested by the riders on equal KTM 250cc 4-stroke Moto3 bikes. It consisted of 14 races in seven meetings on the Grand Prix motorcycle racing calendar, beginning at Circuito de Jerez in Spain on 25 April and ending on 14 September at the Red Bull Ring in Austria. Spanish rider Beñat Fernández emerged as the champion, securing the title with a fifth-place finish in the final race of the season at Red Bull Ring.

== Entry list ==
2026 entry list
| No. | Rider | Rounds |
|---|---|---|
| 4 | (United Kingdom) Sullivan Mounsey | All |
| 7 | (Spain) Beñat Fernández | All |
| 9 | (Vietnam) Luca Agostinelli | All |
| 10 | (Portugal) Afonso Almeida | All |
| 11 | (Spain) David González | 1–5, 7 |
| 17 | (Kyrgyzstan) Yaroslav Karpushin | All |
| 18 | (Australia) Archie Schmidt | All |
| 20 | (Germany) Fynn Kratochwil | All |
| 22 | (Spain) Alejandra Fernández | 1–4, 6–7 |
| 23 | (Malta) Travis Borg | All |
| 24 | (France) Guillem Planques | All |
| 27 | (Colombia) Mateo Marulanda | 1–3, 5–7 |
| 31 | (Italy) Giulio Pugliese | All |
| 32 | (Indonesia) Kiandra Ramadhipa | All |
| 36 | (Netherlands) Jurrien van Crugten | All |
| 47 | (Hungary) Tibor Varga | 1–5 |
| 51 | (Philippines) Alfonsi Daquigan | All |
| 57 | (Italy) Cristian Borrelli | All |
| 62 | (United Kingdom) Ethan Sparks | All |
| 69 | (Spain) Fernando Bujosa | All |
| 70 | (United States) Kristian Daniel Jr. | All |
| 71 | (Spain) Carlos Cano | All |
| 72 | (France) David Da Costa | All |
| 77 | (Venezuela) Kerman Tinez | All |
| 85 | (Thailand) Kiattisak Singhapong | All |
| 97 | (Japan) Ryota Ogiwara | All |

== Calendar ==
2026 Calendar
| Round | | Date | Circuit |
|---|---|---|---|
| 1 | R1 | 25 April | (Spain) Circuito de Jerez, Jerez de la Frontera |
| 1 | R2 | 26 April | (Spain) Circuito de Jerez, Jerez de la Frontera |
| 2 | R1 | 9 May | (France) Bugatti Circuit, Le Mans |
| 2 | R2 | 10 May | (France) Bugatti Circuit, Le Mans |
| 3 | R1 | 30 May | (Italy) Autodromo Internazionale del Mugello, Scarperia e San Piero |
| 3 | R2 | 31 May | (Italy) Autodromo Internazionale del Mugello, Scarperia e San Piero |
| 4 | R1 | 27 June | (Netherlands) TT Circuit Assen, Assen |
| 4 | R2 | 28 June | (Netherlands) TT Circuit Assen, Assen |
| 5 | R1 | 11 July | (Germany) Sachsenring, Hohenstein-Ernstthal |
| 5 | R2 | 12 July | (Germany) Sachsenring, Hohenstein-Ernstthal |
| 6 | R1 | 12 September | (San Marino) Misano World Circuit Marco Simoncelli, Misano Adriatico |
| 6 | R2 | 13 September | (San Marino) Misano World Circuit Marco Simoncelli, Misano Adriatico |
| 7 | R1 | 19 September | (Austria) Red Bull Ring, Spielberg |
| 7 | R2 | 20 September | (Austria) Red Bull Ring, Spielberg |
2026 Calendar

== Results ==
| Round | Date | Circuit | Pole position | Fastest lap | Race winner | Sources |
|---|---|---|---|---|---|---|
| 1 | 25 April | (Spain) Jerez | (Spain) Carlos Cano | (Spain) Beñat Fernández | (Spain) Beñat Fernández | |
| 1 | 26 April | (Spain) Jerez | (Spain) Carlos Cano | (Italy) Cristian Borrelli | (Indonesia) Kiandra Ramadhipa | |
| 2 | 9 May | (France) Le Mans | (Spain) Beñat Fernández | (Malta) Travis Borg | (Spain) Beñat Fernández | |
| 2 | 10 May | (France) Le Mans | (Spain) Beñat Fernández | (Spain) Beñat Fernández | (Spain) David González | |
| 3 | 30 May | (Italy) Mugello | (Spain) David González | (Spain) Fernando Bujosa | (Japan) Ryota Ogiwara | |
| 3 | 31 May | (Italy) Mugello | (Spain) David González | (France) David Da Costa | (Japan) Ryota Ogiwara | |
| 4 | 27 June | (Netherlands) Assen | (France) Guillem Planques (Note: Guillem Planques set the fastest time in qualifying but received a 12 place grid penalty for race 1 due to slow riding during the session. As a result, Sullivan Mounsey was promoted to pole for race 1.) | (Kyrgyzstan) Yaroslav Karpushin | (Spain) Carlos Cano | |
| 4 | 28 June | (Netherlands) Assen | (France) Guillem Planques | (Thailand) Kiattisak Singhapong | (Spain) Beñat Fernández | |
| 5 | 11 July | (Germany) Sachsenring | (Germany) Fynn Kratochwil | (France) David Da Costa | (Japan) Ryota Ogiwara | |
| 5 | 12 July | (Germany) Sachsenring | (Germany) Fynn Kratochwil | (Hungary) Tibor Varga | (Indonesia) Kiandra Ramadhipa | |
| 6 | 12 September | (San Marino) Misano | (France) Guillem Planques | (Thailand) Kiattisak Singhapong | (Spain) Fernando Bujosa | |
| 6 | 13 September | (San Marino) Misano | (France) Guillem Planques | (Colombia) Mateo Marulanda | (Spain) Carlos Cano | |
| 7 | 19 September | (Austria) Red Bull Ring | (United States) Kristian Daniel Jr. | (Japan) Ryota Ogiwara | (Spain) Fernando Bujosa (Note: Kristian Daniel Jr. was the first rider to cross the finish line, but received a penalty of 1 position for exceeding track limits on the final lap. Fernando Bujosa, who was the second rider to cross the finish line, thus inherited the win.) | |
| 7 | 20 September | (Austria) Red Bull Ring | (United States) Kristian Daniel Jr. | (France) Guillem Planques | (Spain) David González | |

== Riders' championship standings ==
Points were awarded to the top fifteen riders, provided the rider finished the race.

| Position | **1st** | **2nd** | **3rd** | **4th** | **5th** | **6th** | **7th** | **8th** | **9th** | **10th** | **11th** | **12th** | **13th** | **14th** | **15th** |
| Points | 25 | 20 | 16 | 13 | 11 | 10 | 9 | 8 | 7 | 6 | 5 | 4 | 3 | 2 | 1 |

| Pos. | Rider | JER (Spain) | | LMS (France) | | MUG (Italy) | | ASS (Netherlands) | | SCH (Germany) | | MIS (San Marino) | | RBR (Austria) | | Pts |
|---|---|---|---|---|---|---|---|---|---|---|---|---|---|---|---|---|
| 1 | (Spain) Beñat Fernández | 1 | 3 | **1** | **8** | 2 | 4 | 3 | 1 | Ret | Ret | 12 | 14 | 6 | 5 | 175 |
| 2 | (Spain) Fernando Bujosa | 2 | 5 | 4 | 2 | Ret | 11 | 5 | 6 | 9 | Ret | 1 | 4 | 1 | 6 | 170 |
| 3 | (Japan) Ryota Ogiwara | 11 | 9 | 2 | 5 | 1 | 1 | 4 | 18 | 1 | Ret | 10 | 7 | 4 | 19 | 159 |
| 4 | (United States) Kristian Daniel Jr. | 6 | 10 | 8 | 9 | 12 | 7 | 2 | Ret | Ret | 4 | 4 | 2 | **2** | **3** | 146 |
| 5 | (Germany) Fynn Kratochwil | 8 | 12 | Ret | 12 | 3 | 2 | 17 | Ret | **4** | **3** | 5 | 3 | 3 | 2 | 144 |
| 6 | (Spain) David González | 4 | Ret | Ret | 1 | **22** | **16** | 7 | 2 | 2 | 7 | | | 7 | 1 | 130 |
| 7 | (Spain) Carlos Cano | **18** | **14** | Ret | 15 | 14 | 5 | 1 | 4 | 8 | 6 | 3 | 1 | Ret | DNS | 113 |
| 8 | (Thailand) Kiattisak Singhapong | 3 | 7 | 7 | Ret | 13 | 6 | 6 | 5 | 3 | 11 | 8 | 20 | 5 | 11 | 113 |
| 9 | (Indonesia) Kiandra Ramadhipa | 7 | 1 | 10 | 6 | 10 | Ret | Ret | 7 | 5 | 1 | Ret | 11 | 16 | Ret | 106 |
| 10 | (France) Guillem Planques | 19 | Ret | 9 | 10 | 15 | 3 | **8** | **11** | Ret | 5 | **2** | **8** | Ret | 7 | 91 |
| 11 | (Kyrgyzstan) Yaroslav Karpushin | 23 | 2 | 19 | 17 | 7 | 13 | 9 | 10 | 6 | 2 | Ret | 6 | Ret | 17 | 85 |
| 12 | (Malta) Travis Borg | 10 | Ret | 5 | 4 | 8 | 8 | Ret | 3 | 10 | Ret | 11 | 13 | 18 | Ret | 76 |
| 13 | (United Kingdom) Sullivan Mounsey | 13 | Ret | 6 | 3 | 4 | 9 | Ret | 13 | Ret | 9 | 15 | Ret | 11 | 9 | 72 |
| 14 | (Colombia) Mateo Marulanda | Ret | 4 | 3 | 11 | 9 | 19 | | | 11 | Ret | 9 | 10 | 8 | 12 | 71 |
| 15 | (Italy) Giulio Pugliese | Ret | 8 | 11 | 7 | 5 | 14 | 18 | 12 | 12 | 13 | Ret | 9 | 14 | 8 | 63 |
| 16 | (United Kingdom) Ethan Sparks | 12 | 18 | 12 | 14 | 11 | 17 | 10 | 19 | 14 | 10 | 7 | 5 | Ret | 4 | 62 |
| 17 | (France) David Da Costa | 15 | 6 | 20 | 13 | 6 | 21 | Ret | 21 | 7 | 8 | 6 | Ret | Ret | 20 | 51 |
| 18 | (Venezuela) Kerman Tinez | 5 | 15 | 13 | 20 | 21 | Ret | 11 | 9 | Ret | 14 | 13 | Ret | 9 | Ret | 39 |
| 19 | (Philippines) Alfonsi Daquigan | 20 | 11 | 14 | Ret | 16 | Ret | 13 | 14 | 13 | 15 | 17 | 19 | 12 | 10 | 26 |
| 20 | (Italy) Cristian Borrelli | 24 | 13 | 17 | 16 | Ret | 18 | 19 | 8 | 16 | 17 | 16 | 12 | 19 | 15 | 16 |
| 21 | (Vietnam) Luca Agostinelli | 9 | Ret | 18 | Ret | Ret | 12 | 15 | 16 | Ret | DNS | 18 | Ret | 13 | 18 | 15 |
| 22 | (Netherlands) Jurrien van Crugten | 17 | 20 | 16 | 22 | 18 | 22 | 12 | 15 | 15 | 18 | 20 | 18 | 10 | 14 | 14 |
| 23 | (Hungary) Tibor Varga | 22 | 16 | Ret | 18 | Ret | 10 | Ret | Ret | Ret | 12 | | | | | 10 |
| 24 | (Spain) Alejandra Fernández | 21 | 19 | 15 | 21 | 20 | 20 | DNS | DNS | | | 19 | 16 | 15 | 13 | 5 |
| 25 | (Portugal) Afonso Almeida | 14 | 17 | Ret | 19 | 17 | Ret | 16 | 17 | 18 | 16 | 14 | 15 | 17 | 16 | 5 |
| 26 | (Australia) Archie Schmidt | 16 | 21 | 21 | Ret | 19 | 15 | 14 | 20 | 17 | Ret | Ret | 17 | Ret | Ret | 3 |
| Pos. | Rider | JER (Spain) | | LMS (France) | | MUG (Italy) | | ASS (Netherlands) | | SCH (Germany) | | MIS (San Marino) | | RBR (Austria) | | Pts |

| Colour | Result |
|---|---|
| Gold | Winner |
| Silver | Second place |
| Bronze | Third place |
| Green | Points classification |
| Blue | Non-points classification |
| Blue | Non-classified finish (NC) |
| Purple | Retired, not classified (Ret) |
| Red | Did not qualify (DNQ) |
| Red | Did not pre-qualify (DNPQ) |
| Black | Disqualified (DSQ) |
| White | Did not start (DNS) |
| White | Withdrew (WD) |
| White | Race cancelled (C) |
| Blank | Did not practice (DNP) |
| Blank | Did not arrive (DNA) |
| Blank | Excluded (EX) |

**Bold** – Pole position
Italic - Fastest Lap
