= 2024 European Talent Cup =

European Talent Cup

2024 European Talent Cup
Previous:	2023	Next:	2025
Support series: FIM JuniorGP World Championship; FIM Moto2 European Championship; FIM Stock European Championship

The 2024 European Talent Cup is the eighth season of the European Talent Cup series. Carlos Cano won the title after beating closest rival Marco Morelli.

== Race calendar and results ==
The provisional calendar was published in November 2023.

round	Date	Circuit	Pole position	Fastest lap	Race winner	Team	ref
1	21 April	Misano	(Argentina) Marco Morelli	(Italy) Giulio Pugliese	(Italy) Giulio Pugliese	Aspar Junior Team	
1	21 April	Misano	(Argentina) Marco Morelli	(Spain) David González	(Argentina) Marco Morelli	Mlav Racing	
2	5 May	Estoril	(Spain) Carlos Cano	(Spain) David González	(Spain) Carlos Cano	SeventyTwo Artbox Racing Team	
2	5 May	Estoril	(Spain) Carlos Cano	(Spain) David González	(Spain) Carlos Cano	SeventyTwo Artbox Racing Team	
3	19 May	Barcelona	(Argentina) Marco Morelli	(Argentina) Marco Morelli	(Argentina) Marco Morelli	Mlav Racing	
4	23 June	Portimão	(Spain) David González	(Argentina) Marco Morelli	(Spain) Carlos Cano	SeventyTwo Artbox Racing Team	
5	15 September	Jerez	(Spain) Carlos Cano	(Spain) Beñat Fernández	(Spain) Carlos Cano	SeventyTwo Artbox Racing Team	
5	15 September	Jerez	(Spain) Carlos Cano	(Argentina) Marco Morelli	(Spain) Carlos Cano	SeventyTwo Artbox Racing Team	
6	13 October	Aragón	(Spain) Carlos Cano	(Argentina) Valentin Perrone	(Italy) Giulio Pugliese	CFMoto Aspar Junior Team	
6	13 October	Aragón	(Spain) Carlos Cano	(Argentina) Valentin Perrone	(Spain) Carlos Cano	SeventyTwo Artbox Racing Team	
7	27 November	Estoril	(Spain) David González	(Argentina) Marco Morelli	(Argentina) Valentin Perrone	Frando Racing VHC Team	

== Entry list ==
The permanent entry list was announced in March 2024

Team	Constructor	No.	Rider	Rounds
(Spain) 84R Team	Honda	62	(Ecuador) Alberto Enríquez	5
(Italy) AC Racing Team	Honda	4	(Italy) Gabriel Tesini	All
(Italy) AC Racing Team	Honda	11	(Spain) David González	All
(Italy) AC Racing Team	Honda	28	(Spain) Alejandra Fernández	6
(Italy) AC Racing Team	Honda	35	(Greece) Vasileios Panteleakis	1–3
(Spain) AGR Team	Honda	10	(Portugal) Afonso Almeida	All
(Spain) AGR Team	Honda	32	(Malta) Travis Borg	7
(Spain) AGR Team	Honda	70	(United States) Kristian Daniel Jr.	All
(United Kingdom) British Talent Team - Mlav Racing	Honda	43	(United Kingdom) Amanuel Brinton	1–2, 4, 6–7
(France) BRS - Brechon Racing School	Honda	30	(France) Matthias Rostagni	All
(France) BRS - Brechon Racing School	Honda	54	(France) Gabriel Pio	6–7
(France) BRS - Brechon Racing School	Honda	72	(France) David Da Costa	1–3, 5–7
(France) BRS - Brechon Racing School	Honda	78	(France) Henri Mignot	All
(United Kingdom) City Lifting	Honda	64	(United Kingdom) Clayton Edmunds	7
(Spain) CFMoto Aspar Junior Team	Honda	14	(Spain) Edu Gutiérrez	All
(Spain) CFMoto Aspar Junior Team	Honda	31	(Italy) Giulio Pugliese	All
(Italy) Eagle–1	Honda	8	(Italy) Edoardo Bertola	1–5, 7
(Netherlands) Ernst Dubbink Eveno Racing	Honda	53	(Netherlands) Kiyano Veijer	1–2, 4–6
(Spain) Fifty Motorsport	Honda	15	(Portugal) Martim Marco	1–4
(France) First Bike Academy	Honda	13	(France) Mattéo Roman	1–5
(France) First Bike Academy	Honda	19	(Hungary) László Lőrinc	1–5
(Italy) Forward EEST Racing	Honda	5	(India) Johann Emmanuel	1–4
(Spain) Frando Racing VHC Team	Honda	7	(Spain) Beñat Fernández	All
(Spain) Frando Racing VHC Team	Honda	47	(Kyrgyzstan) Yaroslav Karpushin	5–7
(Spain) Frando Racing VHC Team	Honda	73	(Argentina) Valentín Perrone	All
(Spain) Gas Up Racing Team; Preicanos Racing Team	Honda	34	(Japan) Seiryu Ikegami	1–3, 5–7
(Spain) HM44	Honda	93	(Spain) Pablo Olivares	5
(Spain) Igaxteam	Honda	45	(Spain) Álex Longarela	7
(Spain) Igaxteam	Honda	48	(Spain) Andrés García	7
(Spain) Ilusion Racing	Honda	41	(Spain) Yvonne Cerpa	1–2, 4–7
(Spain) Ilusion Racing	Honda	82	(United Kingdom) Kyle Payne	All
(Spain) Ilusion Racing	Honda	88	(Bulgaria) Nikola Miroslavov	3, 5–6
(France) JEG Racing; JEG Take Off GP	Honda	6	(France) Benjamin Caillet	All
(France) JEG Racing; JEG Take Off GP	Honda	36	(France) Evan Boxberger	All
(France) JEG Racing; JEG Take Off GP	Honda	42	(Denmark) Julius Frellsen	All
(France) JEG Racing; JEG Take Off GP	Honda	76	(France) Carla Mulot	5–7
(Poland) KidzGP by Covacha R.T.	Honda	52	(Poland) Jeremi Wojciechowski	2–7
(Germany) Liqui Moly Husqvarna Intact GP Junior Team	Honda	20	(Germany) Fynn Kratochwil	6
(Germany) Liqui Moly Husqvarna Intact GP Junior Team	Honda	45	(Spain) Álex Longarela	1–5
(Germany) Liqui Moly Husqvarna Intact GP Junior Team	Honda	96	(Germany) Richard Irmscher	7
(France) Mecaprojets Team ADO	Honda	29	(France) Randy Truchot	All
(France) Mecaprojets Team ADO	Honda	99	(France) Rémy Sanjuan	All
(Spain) MIR Racing Finetwork Team	Honda	27	(Venezuela) Kerman Tinez	All
(Spain) MIR Racing Finetwork Team	Honda	55	(United States) Mikey Lou	4–7
(Spain) MIR Racing Finetwork Team	Honda	92	(Spain) Pablo Olivares	2–3
(Spain) MIR Racing Finetwork Team	Honda	95	(Italy) Leonardo Zanni	1–5
(United Kingdom) Mlav Racing	Honda	46	(United Kingdom) Ryan Frost	7
(United Kingdom) Mlav Racing	Honda	97	(Argentina) Marco Morelli	All
(Spain) MRE Talent	Honda	17	(South Africa) Diego Troy De Ponte	1–5
(Spain) MRE Talent	Honda	89	(Spain) Oliver Cantos	7
(Spain) SeventyTwo Artbox Racing Team	Honda	71	(Spain) Carlos Cano	All
(Spain) SF Racing	Honda	2	(Germany) Rocco Sessler	2
(Spain) SF Racing	Honda	21	(Italy) Erik Michielon	3
(Spain) SF Racing	Honda	28	(Spain) Alejandra Fernández	1–3, 5
(Spain) Super Hugo 44 Team	Honda	77	(Spain) Joel Mora	7
(Italy) Team Echovit Pasini Racing	Honda	18	(Italy) Mathias Tamburini	All
(Italy) Team Echovit Pasini Racing	Honda	81	(Italy) Matteo Gabarrini	1, 3–7
(Italy) Team Echovit Pasini Racing	Honda	90	(Vietnam) Luca Agostinelli	All
(Spain) Team Estrella Galicia 0,0	Honda	22	(Spain) Jesús Torres	All
(Spain) Team Estrella Galicia 0,0	Honda	26	(Spain) Pau Alsina	All
(Spain) Team Estrella Galicia 0,0	Honda	33	(France) Enzo Bellon	2–7
(Spain) Team Estrella Galicia 0,0	Honda	37	(Australia) Marianos Nikolis	All
(Spain) Team Estrella Galicia 0,0	Honda	69	(Spain) Fernando Bujosa	All
(Spain) Team Honda Laglisse	Honda	3	(Japan) Jean K. Turner	1–3
(Spain) Team Honda Laglisse	Honda	12	(Spain) Adriano Rodrigo	1–2
(Spain) Team Impala Honda	Honda	23	(Spain) Ignacio Galán	6–7
(Spain) Team Larresport	Honda	9	(France) Elliot Kassigian	All
(Spain) Team Larresport	Honda	25	(Spain) Gonzalo Pérez	All

== Championship' standings ==
Points were awarded to the top fifteen riders, provided the rider finished the race.

Position	1st	2nd	3rd	4th	5th	6th	7th	8th	9th	10th	11th	12th	13th	14th	15th
Points	25	20	16	13	11	10	9	8	7	6	5	4	3	2	1

Pos.	Rider	MIS (Italy)		EST (Portugal)		BAR (Spain)	ALG (Portugal)	JER (Spain)		ARA (Spain)		EST (Portugal)	Pts
1	(Spain) Carlos Cano	6	6	1^{P}	1^{P}	Ret	1	1^{P}	1^{P}	3^{P}	1^{P}	6	196
2	(Argentina) Marco Morelli	2^{P}	1^{P}	2	Ret	1^{PF}	7^{F}	6	5^{F}	2	3	5^{F}	167
3	(Italy) Giulio Pugliese	1^{F}	17	10	6	3	2	4	4	1	6	2	158
4	(Spain) David González	3	2^{F}	Ret^{F}	Ret^{F}	2	3^{P}	2	3	9	2	3^{P}	151
5	(Argentina) Valentín Perrone	4	4	12	3	5	4	3	2	Ret^{F}	7^{F}	1	140
6	(Spain) Jesús Torres	10	7	6	2	9	WD	Ret	7	Ret	10	8	75
7	(Spain) Beñat Fernández	11	Ret	Ret	9	12	9	8^{F}	10	5	5	4	72
8	(Italy) Leonardo Zanni	7	3	Ret	8	7	Ret	9	11				54
9	(Venezuela) Kerman Tinez	9	5	Ret	Ret	13	26	26	17	4	4	9	54
10	(Italy) Gabriel Tesini	5	Ret	11	17	6	13	10	14	DNQ	14	7	50
11	(France) Enzo Bellon			DNQ	DNQ	21	11	5	6	8	9	10	47
12	(Spain) Álex Longarela	Ret	Ret	4	16	14	5	7	9			14	44
13	(Spain) Pau Alsina	16	8	Ret	5	8	6	12	15	Ret	Ret	Ret	42
14	(Japan) Seiryu Ikegami	Ret	12	15	4	4		13	16	DNQ	DNQ	11	39
15	(Vietnam) Luca Agostinelli	Ret	9	5	14	20	12	Ret	22	6	20	16	34
16	(Spain) Gonzalo Pérez	12	11	14	10	11	8	Ret	12	DNQ	DNQ	17	34
17	(Spain) Fernando Bujosa	Ret	Ret	3	7	Ret	17	14	Ret	12	28	Ret	31
18	(Australia) Marianos Nikolis	8	Ret	17	13	15	10	17	13	11	11	19	31
19	(United States) Kristian Daniel Jr.	Ret	Ret	Ret	15	17	14	19	20	7	8	13	23
20	(Spain) Pablo Olivares			7	12	10		DNQ	DNQ				19
21	(Kyrgyzstan) Yaroslav Karpushin							11	8	23	13	WD	16
22	(France) Benjamin Caillet	13	10	Ret	11	18	Ret	21	Ret	20	24	DNQ	14
23	(United States) Mikey Lou						15	15	18	10	15	12	13
24	(Greece) Vasileios Panteleakis	DNQ	DNQ	8	Ret	22							8
25	(France) David Da Costa	17	15	9	23	Ret		DNQ	DNQ	Ret	DNS	DNQ	8
26	(Italy) Mathias Tamburini	15	13	Ret	26	DNQ	21	20	23	Ret	DNS	DNQ	4
27	(Spain) Edu Gutiérrez	14	21	DNQ	DNQ	19	16	18	21	17	14	22	4
28	(Italy) Matteo Gabarrini	WD	WD			Ret	Ret	23	24	13	18	26	3
29	(Germany) Rocco Sessler			13	24								3
30	(Bulgaria) Nikola Miroslavov					24		DNQ	DNQ	14	17		2
31	(France) Rémy Sanjuan	18	14	DNQ	18	23	19	DNQ	DNQ	DNQ	26	24	2
32	(Germany) Fynn Kratochwil									15	19		1
33	(Malta) Travis Borg											15	1
	(Italy) Edoardo Bertola	DNQ	DNQ	16	19	16	18	Ret	Ret			18	0
	(Ecuador) Alberto Enríquez							16	19				0
	(Denmark) Julius Frellsen	21	16	Ret	20	DNQ	Ret	24	Ret	DNQ	DNQ	DNQ	0
	(Spain) Yvonne Cerpa	DNQ	DNQ	Ret	DNS		DNQ	DNQ	DNQ	16	21	25	0
	(Spain) Ignacio Galán									Ret	16	Ret	0
	(France) Evan Boxberger	DNQ	DNQ	18	22	25	25	DNQ	DNQ	18	25	21	0
	(United Kingdom) Kyle Payne	22	18	DNQ	DNQ	DNQ	DNQ	DNQ	DNQ	DNQ	DNQ	DNQ	0
	(Portugal) Afonso Almeida	23	20	DSQ	21	DNQ	23	DNQ	DNQ	19	23	23	0
	(Spain) Adriano Rodrigo	19	Ret	DNQ	DNQ								0
	(Netherlands) Kiyano Veijer	24	19	DNQ	DNQ		24	25	26	DNQ	DNQ		0
	(United Kingdom) Amanuel Brinton	DNQ	DNQ	DNQ	DNQ		20			DNQ	DNQ	20	0
	(France) Matthias Rostagni	20	Ret	WD	WD	26	DNQ	WD	WD	Ret	22	Ret	0
	(Spain) Alejandra Fernández	DNQ	DNQ	DNQ	DNQ	DNQ		DNQ	DNQ	21	27		0
	(France) Henri Mignot	DNQ	DNQ	Ret	25	DNQ	DNQ	22	25	DNQ	DNQ	DNQ	0
	(Portugal) Martim Marco	25	22	DNQ	DNQ	DNQ	DNQ						0
	(France) Randy Truchot	DNQ	DNQ	DNQ	DNQ	DNQ	DNQ	DNQ	DNQ	22	Ret	DNQ	0
	(France) Mattéo Roman	WD	WD	WD	WD	DNQ	22	DNQ	DNQ				0
	(France) Elliot Kassigian	DNQ	DNQ	DNQ	DNQ	DNQ	DNQ	DNQ	DNQ	DNQ	DNQ	DNQ	
	(South Africa) Diego Troy De Ponte	DNQ	DNQ	DNQ	DNQ	DNQ	DNQ	DNQ	DNQ				
	(Hungary) László Lőrinc	DNQ	DNQ	DNQ	DNQ	DNQ	DNQ	DNQ	DNQ				
	(Poland) Jeremi Wojciechowski			DNQ	DNQ	DNQ	DNQ	WD	WD	DNQ	DNQ	DNQ	
	(India) Johann Emmanuel	DNQ	DNQ	DNQ	DNQ	DNQ	DNQ						
	(Japan) Jean K. Turner	DNQ	DNQ	DNQ	DNQ	DNQ							
	(France) Carla Mulot							DNQ	DNQ	DNQ	DNQ	DNQ	
	(France) Gabriel Pio									DNQ	DNQ	DNQ	
	(Italy) Erik Michielon					DNQ							
	(Spain) Andrés García											DNQ	
	(United Kingdom) Clayton Edmunds											DNQ	
	(Spain) Joel Mora											DNQ	
	(Spain) Oliver Cantos											DNQ	
	(Germany) Richard Irmscher											DNQ	
	(United Kingdom) Ryan Frost											DNQ	
Pos.	Rider	MIS (Italy)		EST (Portugal)		BAR (Spain)	ALG (Portugal)	JER (Spain)		ARA (Spain)		EST (Portugal)	Points

Colour	Result
Gold	Winner
Silver	Second place
Bronze	Third place
Green	Points classification
Blue	Non-points classification
Blue	Non-classified finish (NC)
Purple	Retired, not classified (Ret)
Red	Did not qualify (DNQ)
Red	Did not pre-qualify (DNPQ)
Black	Disqualified (DSQ)
White	Did not start (DNS)
White	Withdrew (WD)
White	Race cancelled (C)
Blank	Did not practice (DNP)
Blank	Did not arrive (DNA)
Blank	Excluded (EX)

P – Pole position
F – Fastest lap
