= 2025 Red Bull MotoGP Rookies Cup =

Motorcycle racing competition

2025 Red Bull MotoGP Rookies Cup
Previous:	2024	Next:	2026

The 2025 Red Bull Rookies Cup was the nineteenth season of the Red Bull MotoGP Rookies Cup and the thirteenth year contested by the riders on equal KTM 250cc 4-stroke Moto3 bikes. It consisted of 14 races in seven meetings on the Grand Prix motorcycle racing calendar, beginning at Circuito de Jerez in Spain on 26 April and ending on 14 September at the Misano World Circuit Marco Simoncelli in Italy. Spanish rider Brian Uriarte emerged as the champion, securing the title with a win in the first race at Misano.

== Entry list ==
2025 entry list
No.	Rider	Rounds
4	(United Kingdom) Sullivan Mounsey	All
5	(Austria) Leo Rammerstorfer	All
7	(Spain) Beñat Fernández	All
9	(Vietnam) Luca Agostinelli	All
11	(Spain) David González	All
13	(Malaysia) Hakim Danish	All
16	(Spain) Joel Pons	All
17	(Kyrgyzstan) Yaroslav Karpushin	All
22	(Spain) Alejandra Fernández	All
24	(France) Guillem Planques	All
29	(United Kingdom) Lucas Brown	All
31	(Italy) Giulio Pugliese	All
32	(Indonesia) Kiandra Ramadhipa	All
34	(Japan) Zen Mitani	All
36	(Netherlands) Jurrien van Crugten	All
40	(San Marino) Gabriel Tesini	1–4, 6–7
45	(South Africa) Kgopotso Mononyane	All
48	(Switzerland) Lenoxx Phommara	1, 3–4, 6–7
50	(Australia) Carter Thompson	All
51	(Spain) Brian Uriarte	All
54	(Indonesia) Veda Pratama	1, 3–7
70	(United States) Kristian Daniel Jr.	All
72	(France) David Da Costa	1–4, 7
77	(Venezuela) Kerman Tinez	All
85	(Thailand) Kiattisak Singhapong	All
95	(Argentina) Marco Morelli	All
Source: redbull.com

== Calendar and results ==
2025 Calendar
Round	Date	Circuit	Pole position	Fastest lap	Race winner	Sources
1	26 April	(Spain) Jerez	(Malaysia) Hakim Danish	(Indonesia) Veda Pratama	(Spain) Brian Uriarte	
1	27 April	(Spain) Jerez	(Malaysia) Hakim Danish	(Australia) Carter Thompson	(Australia) Carter Thompson	
2	10 May	(France) Le Mans	(Malaysia) Hakim Danish	(Malaysia) Hakim Danish	(Spain) Brian Uriarte	
2	11 May	(France) Le Mans	(Malaysia) Hakim Danish	(Malaysia) Hakim Danish	(Spain) Beñat Fernández	
3	7 June	(Spain) MotorLand Aragón	(Indonesia) Veda Pratama	(Malaysia) Hakim Danish	(Spain) Brian Uriarte	
3	8 June	(Spain) MotorLand Aragón	(Indonesia) Veda Pratama	(Italy) Giulio Pugliese	(Malaysia) Hakim Danish	
4	21 June	(Italy) Mugello	(Spain) Brian Uriarte	(Indonesia) Kiandra Ramadhipa	(Indonesia) Veda Pratama	
4	22 June	(Italy) Mugello	(Spain) Brian Uriarte	(Malaysia) Hakim Danish	(Indonesia) Veda Pratama	
5	12 July	(Germany) Sachsenring	(Kyrgyzstan) Yaroslav Karpushin	(France) Guillem Planques	(Spain) Brian Uriarte	
5	13 July	(Germany) Sachsenring	(Kyrgyzstan) Yaroslav Karpushin	(Indonesia) Kiandra Ramadhipa	(Indonesia) Veda Pratama	
6	16 August	(Austria) Red Bull Ring	(Indonesia) Veda Pratama	(Spain) Brian Uriarte	(Spain) Brian Uriarte	
6	17 August	(Austria) Red Bull Ring	(Indonesia) Veda Pratama	(Spain) David González	(Spain) Brian Uriarte	
7	13 September	(San Marino) Misano	(Spain) Brian Uriarte	(Argentina) Marco Morelli	(Spain) Brian Uriarte	
7	14 September	(San Marino) Misano	(Spain) Brian Uriarte	(Spain) Brian Uriarte	(Spain) David González	

== Riders' championship standings ==
Points were awarded to the top fifteen riders, provided the rider finished the race.

Position	**1st**	**2nd**	**3rd**	**4th**	**5th**	**6th**	**7th**	**8th**	**9th**	**10th**	**11th**	**12th**	**13th**	**14th**	**15th**
Points	25	20	16	13	11	10	9	8	7	6	5	4	3	2	1

Pos.	Rider	JER (Spain)		LMS (France)		ARA (Spain)		MUG (Italy)		SCH (Germany)		RBR (Austria)		MIS (San Marino)		Pts
1	(Spain) Brian Uriarte	1	20	1	Ret	1	2	**6**	**5**	1	Ret	1	1	**1**	**2**	236
2	(Indonesia) Veda Pratama	3	Ret			**4**	**4**	1	1	4	1	**2**	**2**	Ret	5	181
3	(Malaysia) Hakim Danish	**2**	**2**	**2**	**2**	2	1	13	2	10	18	8	13	10	Ret	171
4	(Spain) David González	8	Ret	10	11	3	3	2	7	9	5	5	4	4	1	160
5	(Argentina) Marco Morelli	5	4	9	3	16	12	5	4	Ret	17	7	3	2	3	136
6	(Spain) Beñat Fernández	6	5	5	1	Ret	10	10	3	7	8	16	6	Ret	8	120
7	(Japan) Zen Mitani	7	19	11	Ret	6	15	8	12	5	2	Ret	9	3	4	104
8	(Indonesia) Kiandra Ramadhipa	15	14	12	Ret	10	9	12	8	2	4	4	12	5	7	102
9	(Australia) Carter Thompson	4	1	6	Ret	9	Ret	19	DSQ	6	6	17	8	6	10	99
10	(United States) Kristian Daniel Jr.	Ret	3	4	Ret	Ret	13	9	9	12	9	3	5	19	12	88
11	(Italy) Giulio Pugliese	9	Ret	3	Ret	5	8	3	Ret	16	7	Ret	Ret	7	6	86
12	(Kyrgyzstan) Yaroslav Karpushin	Ret	11	14	12	7	6	18	6	**13**	**3**	10	10	Ret	9	78
13	(Austria) Leo Rammerstorfer	11	8	7	7	Ret	5	4	11	Ret	Ret	11	7	12	Ret	78
14	(France) Guillem Planques	10	7	8	5	13	17	16	17	3	11	9	Ret	9	15	73
15	(Thailand) Kiattisak Singhapong	12	6	Ret	4	Ret	14	11	15	8	13	6	15	15	Ret	58
16	(United Kingdom) Sullivan Mounsey	Ret	13	13	9	11	18	14	10	19	10	13	11	13	14	45
17	(Vietnam) Luca Agostinelli	16	16	16	15	8	11	7	14	11	Ret	15	Ret	8	Ret	39
18	(Venezuela) Kerman Tinez	Ret	DNS	Ret	DNS	Ret	7	15	13	18	12	12	Ret	14	21	23
19	(United Kingdom) Lucas Brown	Ret	18	Ret	6	14	20	Ret	DNS	17	15	14	19	18	17	15
20	(San Marino) Gabriel Tesini	Ret	9	Ret	13	12	16	Ret	DNS			Ret	Ret	Ret	19	14
21	(Netherlands) Jurrien van Crugten	18	15	17	10	15	19	Ret	21	14	14	Ret	17	17	18	12
22	(South Africa) Kgopotso Mononyane	14	12	Ret	14	19	21	20	18	21	16	18	Ret	21	13	11
23	(Switzerland) Lenoxx Phommara	DNS	DNS			20	DNS	16	21			19	16	11	11	10
24	(Spain) Alejandra Fernández	19	17	19	8	18	23	22	20	20	Ret	20	18	20	16	8
25	(France) David Da Costa	17	10	15	Ret	17	Ret	Ret	DNS					16	20	7
26	(Spain) Joel Pons	13	Ret	18	Ret	Ret	22	17	19	15	Ret	21	14	Ret	Ret	6
Pos.	Rider	JER (Spain)		LMS (France)		ARA (Spain)		MUG (Italy)		SCH (Germany)		RBR (Austria)		MIS (San Marino)		Pts

Colour	Result
Gold	Winner
Silver	Second place
Bronze	Third place
Green	Points classification
Blue	Non-points classification
Blue	Non-classified finish (NC)
Purple	Retired, not classified (Ret)
Red	Did not qualify (DNQ)
Red	Did not pre-qualify (DNPQ)
Black	Disqualified (DSQ)
White	Did not start (DNS)
White	Withdrew (WD)
White	Race cancelled (C)
Blank	Did not practice (DNP)
Blank	Did not arrive (DNA)
Blank	Excluded (EX)

**Bold** – Pole position
Italic - Fastest Lap
