= 2026 FIM Moto3 Junior World Championship =

Junior Motorcycle World Championship

2026 FIM Moto3 Junior World Championship
Previous:	2025	Next:	2027
Support series: Moto2 European Championship; Moto4 European Cup; Stock European Championship

The 2026 FIM Moto3 Junior World Championship was the fifteenth season of the class, formerly known as the JuniorGP World Championship, a motorcycle racing series organized by Dorna intended as the final step to the Grand Prix motorcycle racing World Championship. The season began at Barcelona on 22 May, and concluded at Misano on 18 October.

Spanish rider Carlos Cano, riding for CFMoto Aspar Junior Team, won the championship in Race 1 of the final round at Misano.

== Teams and riders ==
The provisional entry list was released on 13 February 2026. All teams use series-specified Pirelli tyres.

Team	Constructor	No.	Rider	Status	Rounds
(Spain) CFMoto Aspar Junior Team	CFMoto	17	(Kyrgyzstan) Yaroslav Karpushin	R	All
(Spain) CFMoto Aspar Junior Team	CFMoto	31	(Italy) Giulio Pugliese		All
(Spain) CFMoto Aspar Junior Team	CFMoto	71	(Spain) Carlos Cano	R	All
(United Kingdom) American Talent Team – GRYD Racing (United Kingdom) GRYD Racing	Honda	22	(United Kingdom) Ryan Frost	R	7
(United Kingdom) American Talent Team – GRYD Racing (United Kingdom) GRYD Racing	Honda	52	(United Kingdom) Evan Belford		2–5
(United Kingdom) American Talent Team – GRYD Racing (United Kingdom) GRYD Racing	Honda	55	(United Kingdom) Johnny Garness	R	5–7
(United Kingdom) American Talent Team – GRYD Racing (United Kingdom) GRYD Racing	Honda	70	(United States) Kristian Daniel Jr.		1, 6
(Japan) Asia Talent Team	Honda	97	(Japan) Ryota Ogiwara	R	All
(United Kingdom) British Talent Team	Honda	75	(United Kingdom) Filip Surowiak	R	All
(Japan) Honda Asia-Dream Racing Junior Team	Honda	32	(Indonesia) Kiandra Ramadhipa	R	All
(Japan) Honda Asia-Dream Racing Junior Team	Honda	85	(Thailand) Kiattisak Singhapong		All
(Italy) Snipers Igax Team	Honda	7	(Spain) Beñat Fernández		1
(Italy) Snipers Igax Team	Honda	11	(Spain) David González		6
(Italy) Snipers Igax Team	Honda	49	(Spain) Álex Longarela	R	2, 5, 7
(Italy) Snipers Igax Team	Honda	70	(United States) Kristian Daniel Jr.		3
(Spain) Team Monlau Motul	Honda	23	(Malta) Travis Borg	R	All
(Spain) Team Monlau Motul	Honda	37	(Australia) Marianos Nikolis		1–6
(Spain) Team Monlau Motul	Honda	77	(Venezuela) Kerman Tinez	R	All
(Spain) Team Laglisse	Husqvarna	14	(Spain) Eduardo Gutiérrez	R	1–6
(Spain) Team Laglisse	Husqvarna	25	(Italy) Leonardo Abruzzo		All
(Spain) Team Laglisse	Husqvarna	95	(Italy) Mathias Tamburini	R	7
(Italy) AC Racing Team	KTM	11	(Spain) David González		1–5, 7
(Italy) AC Racing Team	KTM	18	(Spain) Pablo Olivares	R	1–3
(Italy) AC Racing Team	KTM	69	(Spain) Fernando Bujosa	R	All
(Italy) AC Racing Team	KTM	95	(Italy) Mathias Tamburini	R	4–6
(Spain) AGR Team	KTM	45	(South Africa) Kgopotso Mononyane		1–5
(Spain) AGR Team	KTM	70	(United States) Kristian Daniel Jr.		7
(Spain) AGR Team	KTM	74	(Japan) Seiryu Ikegami	R	All
(France) CIP Green Power Junior Team	KTM	4	(United Kingdom) Sullivan Mounsey		1–4
(France) CIP Green Power Junior Team	KTM	33	(France) Enzo Bellon		All
(Italy) Eagle-1	KTM	8	(Italy) Edoardo Bertola		1–3, 5–7
(Germany) F. Koch Rennsport	KTM	2	(Germany) Loris Schönrock		All
(Spain) Frando Racing VHC Team MSI	KTM	12	(Spain) Gonzalo Pérez	R	All
(France) JEG Racing (France) JEG Take Off GP	KTM	27	(France) Henri Mignot	R	All
(France) JEG Racing (France) JEG Take Off GP	KTM	72	(France) David Da Costa	R	1–6
(Spain) Larresport	KTM	99	(France) Rémy Sanjuan	R	1–6
(Spain) Lula's Team	KTM	26	(Ecuador) Alberto Enríquez	R	1–4
(Spain) Momoven Racing	KTM	24	(France) Guillem Planques	R	All
(Spain) Momoven Racing	KTM	34	(France) Fabio Pilato	R	All
(Spain) Momoven Racing	KTM	57	(Italy) Leonardo Zanni		All
(Italy) MTA Junior Team	KTM	47	(Hungary) Tibor Varga	R	1–5
(Italy) MTA Junior Team	KTM	81	(Italy) Matteo Gabarrini	R	All
(Spain) SF Racing	KTM	73	(Australia) Levi Russo	R	All
(Italy) Team Echovit Pasini Racing	KTM	21	(Italy) Erik Michielon		All

Icon	Status
R	Rookie

== Calendar ==
The provisional calendar was released on 18 September 2025.

Round	Circuit	Date	Map of circuit locations
1	(Spain) Circuit de Barcelona, Montmeló	22–24 May	2026 FIM Moto3 Junior World Championship is located in Europe
2	(Portugal) Circuito do Estoril, Alcabideche	12–14 June	2026 FIM Moto3 Junior World Championship is located in Europe
3	(Spain) Circuito de Jerez, Jerez de la Frontera	3–5 July	2026 FIM Moto3 Junior World Championship is located in Europe
4	(France) Circuit de Nevers Magny-Cours, Magny-Cours	24–26 July	2026 FIM Moto3 Junior World Championship is located in Europe
5	(Spain) Circuit Ricardo Tormo, Cheste	4–6 September	2026 FIM Moto3 Junior World Championship is located in Europe
6	(Spain) MotorLand Aragón, Alcañiz	25–27 September	2026 FIM Moto3 Junior World Championship is located in Europe
7	(Italy) Misano World Circuit, Misano Adriatico	16–18 October	2026 FIM Moto3 Junior World Championship is located in Europe

== Race results ==
Round		Circuit	Pole position	Fastest lap	Winning rider	Winning team
1	R1	(Spain) Barcelona	(Spain) Fernando Bujosa	(Malta) Travis Borg	(Italy) Leonardo Zanni	(Spain) Momoven Racing
1	R2	(Spain) Barcelona	(Spain) Fernando Bujosa	(Italy) Leonardo Zanni	(Italy) Giulio Pugliese	(Spain) CFMoto Aspar Junior Team
2	R1	(Portugal) Estoril	(Thailand) Kiattisak Singhapong	(Malta) Travis Borg	(Indonesia) Kiandra Ramadhipa	(Japan) Honda Asia-Dream Racing Junior Team
3	R1	(Spain) Jerez	(Italy) Leonardo Zanni	(Spain) David González	(Spain) Carlos Cano	(Spain) CFMoto Aspar Junior Team
3	R2	(Spain) Jerez	(Italy) Leonardo Zanni	(Spain) Carlos Cano	(Kyrgyzstan) Yaroslav Karpushin	(Spain) CFMoto Aspar Junior Team
4	R1	(France) Magny-Cours	(Spain) Carlos Cano	(Spain) Carlos Cano	(Spain) Carlos Cano	(Spain) CFMoto Aspar Junior Team
5	R1	(Spain) Valencia	(Spain) Carlos Cano	(France) Guillem Planques	(Spain) Carlos Cano	(Spain) CFMoto Aspar Junior Team
5	R2	(Spain) Valencia	(Spain) Carlos Cano	(Indonesia) Kiandra Ramadhipa	(Spain) Carlos Cano	(Spain) CFMoto Aspar Junior Team
6	R1	(Spain) Aragón	(Thailand) Kiattisak Singhapong	(Japan) Ryota Ogiwara	(Spain) Carlos Cano	(Spain) CFMoto Aspar Junior Team
6	R2	(Spain) Aragón	(Thailand) Kiattisak Singhapong	(Japan) Ryota Ogiwara	(Spain) Fernando Bujosa	(Italy) AC Racing Team
7	R1	(Italy) Misano	(Indonesia) Kiandra Ramadhipa	(Thailand) Kiattisak Singhapong	(Spain) Fernando Bujosa	(Italy) AC Racing Team
7	R2	(Italy) Misano	(Indonesia) Kiandra Ramadhipa	(Indonesia) Kiandra Ramadhipa	(Spain) Fernando Bujosa	(Italy) AC Racing Team

== Championship standings ==
Scoring system
Points are awarded to the top fifteen finishers. A rider has to finish the race to earn points.

Position	1st	2nd	3rd	4th	5th	6th	7th	8th	9th	10th	11th	12th	13th	14th	15th
Points	25	20	16	13	11	10	9	8	7	6	5	4	3	2	1

=== Riders' championship ===
Pos.	Rider	Bike	CAT (Spain)		EST (Portugal)	JER (Spain)		MAG (France)	VAL (Spain)		ARA (Spain)		MIS (Italy)		Points
1	(Spain) Carlos Cano	CFMoto	8	4	3	1	9^{F}	1^{P F}	1^{P}	1^{P}	1	5	6	7	199
2	(Kyrgyzstan) Yaroslav Karpushin	CFMoto	Ret	9	12	2	1	4	2	2	5	3	3	3	168
3	(Italy) Giulio Pugliese	CFMoto	2	1	4	5	16	10	4	4	3	2	5	4	161
4	(Spain) Fernando Bujosa	KTM	Ret^{P}	3^{P}	8	3	Ret	2	Ret	3	25	1	1	1	151
5	(Indonesia) Kiandra Ramadhipa	Honda	3	6	1	7	21	12	10	6^{F}	2	4	4^{P}	2^{P F}	146
6	(Malta) Travis Borg	Honda	Ret^{F}	2	2^{F}	4	3	3	7	9	11	11	7	9	127
7	(Thailand) Kiattisak Singhapong	Honda	6	12	7^{P}	10	6	8	5	13	7^{P}	Ret^{P}	2^{F}	5	101
8	(Japan) Ryota Ogiwara	Honda	4	7	10	9	7	6	6	7	6^{F}	7^{F}	Ret	Ret	92
9	(Italy) Leonardo Zanni	KTM	1	Ret^{F}	6	Ret^{P}	5^{P}	9	11	5	Ret	12	9	6	90
10	(Spain) David González	KTM	Ret	Ret	5	17^{F}	2	Ret	3	Ret			Ret	Ret	70
10	(Spain) David González	Honda									4	6			70
11	(France) Guillem Planques	KTM	9	8	9	6	Ret	7	Ret^{F}	12	8	9	Ret	DNS	60
12	(Italy) Matteo Gabarrini	KTM	16	15	13	Ret	13	5	8	10	Ret	8	11	8	53
13	(Venezuela) Kerman Tinez	Honda	10	Ret	Ret	11	4	14	DNS	8	14	15	13	13	43
14	(France) David Da Costa	KTM	7	14	14	12	8	Ret	9	11	WD	WD			37
15	(France) Enzo Bellon	KTM	12	13	11	Ret	14	15	19	16	10	13	10	10	36
16	(United States) Kristian Daniel Jr.	Honda	27	10		13	10				9	10			28
16	(United States) Kristian Daniel Jr.	KTM											Ret	Ret	28
17	(Italy) Leonardo Abruzzo	Husqvarna	11	5	18	22	Ret	17	21	Ret	15	16	14	12	23
18	(South Africa) Kgopotso Mononyane	KTM	5	11	15	14	25	Ret	20	24					19
19	(Italy) Erik Michielon	KTM	Ret	19	19	18	12	WD	15	Ret	12	17	12	11	18
20	(Australia) Marianos Nikolis	Honda	14	Ret	Ret	Ret	18	Ret	12	14	13	14			13
21	(United Kingdom) Sullivan Mounsey	KTM	13	Ret	16	23	15	11							9
22	(France) Rémy Sanjuan	KTM	15	Ret	DNQ	Ret	11	13	Ret	Ret	Ret	18			9
23	(Spain) Álex Longarela	Honda			Ret				WD	WD			8	Ret	8
24	(United Kingdom) Evan Belford	Honda			Ret	8	Ret	Ret	DNS	DNS					8
25	(United Kingdom) Filip Surowiak	Honda	24	21	20	19	17	18	14	17	16	19	15	14	5
26	(Spain) Gonzalo Pérez	KTM	17	18	17	DNQ	DNQ	16	13	19	Ret	21	18	Ret	3
27	(Japan) Seiryu Ikegami	KTM	DNQ	DNQ	Ret	DNS	19	22	16	15	17	Ret	20	15	2
28	(Hungary) Tibor Varga	KTM	21	20	Ret	15	Ret	19	WD	WD					1
29	(United Kingdom) Johnny Garness	Honda							18	DNS	Ret	24	17	16	0
30	(Spain) Pablo Olivares	KTM	19	23	Ret	16	Ret								0
31	(United Kingdom) Ryan Frost	Honda											16	19	0
32	(Spain) Beñat Fernández	Honda	25	16											0
33	(Italy) Mathias Tamburini	KTM						20	17	18	18	22			0
33	(Italy) Mathias Tamburini	Husqvarna											Ret	17	0
34	(Ecuador) Alberto Enríquez	KTM	18	17	25	Ret	20	21							0
35	(Australia) Levi Russo	KTM	23	24	23	DNQ	DNQ	23	24	20	19	20	Ret	18	0
36	(Italy) Edoardo Bertola	KTM	DNQ	DNQ	22	Ret	Ret		Ret	23	21	23	19	20	0
37	(Spain) Eduardo Gutiérrez	Husqvarna	20	Ret	21	20	24	Ret	23	22	22	26			0
38	(France) Henri Mignot	KTM	22	22	24	21	23	Ret	25	25	20	25	22	Ret	0
39	(France) Fabio Pilato	KTM	26	25	DNQ	24	22	24	22	21	23	27	21	Ret	0
40	(Germany) Loris Schönrock	KTM	DNQ	DNQ	DNQ	DNQ	DNQ	25	Ret	26	24	28	23	21	0
Pos.	Rider	Bike	CAT (Spain)		EST (Portugal)	JER (Spain)		MAG (France)	VAL (Spain)		ARA (Spain)		MIS (Italy)		Points

Colour	Result
Gold	Winner
Silver	Second place
Bronze	Third place
Green	Points classification
Blue	Non-points classification
Blue	Non-classified finish (NC)
Purple	Retired, not classified (Ret)
Red	Did not qualify (DNQ)
Red	Did not pre-qualify (DNPQ)
Black	Disqualified (DSQ)
White	Did not start (DNS)
White	Withdrew (WD)
White	Race cancelled (C)
Blank	Did not practice (DNP)
Blank	Did not arrive (DNA)
Blank	Excluded (EX)

P – Pole position
F – Fastest lap
