= Álex Longarela =

Spanish motorcycle racer (born 2009)

- Born: 1 August 2009 (age 17); Móstoles, Spain
- Nationality: Spanish
Statistics
Moto3 Junior World Championship
Active years	2026–
Championships	0
Manufacturer	Honda (2026)
Starts / Wins / Podiums / Poles / F. laps / Points; 3 / 0 / 0 / 0 / 0 / 9
European Talent Cup
Active years	2024–2025
Championships	0
Manufacturer	Honda
Starts / Wins / Podiums / Poles / F. laps / Points; 20 / 2 / 6 / 0 / 2 / 197

Álex Longarela Montes (born 1 August 2009) is a Spanish motorcycle racer currently competing in the FIM Moto3 Junior World Championship for the Igax Team. He was the 2019 Spanish MiniGP 110 champion, the 2021 ESBK Moto4 champion and the 2023 ESBK PreMoto3 champion.

== Career results ==
=== ESBK Championship ===
==== Races by year ====
(key)

Year	Class	Bike	Pos	Pts
2021	Moto4	BeOn	1st	252
2022	PreMoto3	BeOn	2nd	212
2023	PreMoto3	BeOn	1st	242

=== European Talent Cup ===
(key) (Races in bold indicate pole position, races in italics indicate fastest lap)

Year	Bike	1	2	3	4	5	6	7	8	9	10	11	Pos.	Pts.
2024	Honda	MIS; Ret	MIS; Ret	EST; 4	EST; 16	BAR; 14	ALG; 5	JER; 7	JER; 9	ARA	ARA	EST; 14	12th	44
2025	Honda	EST1; 2	EST2; 3	JER1; 3	JER2; 1	MAG1; Ret	MAG2; 2	ARA; 4	MIS1; 10	MIS2; 15	CAT; 4	VAL; 1	3rd	153

=== FIM Moto3 Junior World Championship ===
==== Races by year ====
(key) (Races in bold indicate pole position; races in italics indicate fastest lap)

Year	Bike	1	2	3	4	5	6	7	8	9	10	11	12	Pos	Pts
2026	Honda	CAT1	CAT2	EST; Ret	JER1	JER2	MAG	VAL1; WD	VAL2; WD	ARA1	ARA2	MIS1; 7	MIS2; Ret	21st	9
