= 2022 European Talent Cup =

European Talent Cup

2022 European Talent Cup
Previous:	2021	Next:	2023
Support series: FIM JuniorGP World Championship; FIM Moto2 European Championship

The 2022 Hawkers European Talent Cup (HETC) is the sixth season of the European Talent Cup series. Italian Guido Pini won the title after beating closest rival Joel Esteban.

== Calendar ==
The calendar was published in November 2021. The Jerez and second Valencia rounds were advanced to July and October.

Round	Date	Circuit	Pole position	Fastest lap	Race winner
1	8 May	(Portugal) Estoril	(Spain) Joel Esteban	(Spain) Joel Esteban	(Spain) Joel Esteban
1	8 May	(Portugal) Estoril	(Spain) Joel Esteban	(Spain) Joel Esteban	(Spain) Joel Esteban
2	22 May	(Spain) Valencia	(Spain) Joel Esteban	(Finland) Rico Salmela	(Spain) Joel Esteban
2	22 May	(Spain) Valencia	(Spain) Joel Esteban	(Italy) Dodó Boggio	(Spain) Máximo Quiles
3	12 June	(Spain) Barcelona	(Spain) Joel Esteban	(Spain) César Parrilla	(Spain) Brian Uriarte
4	3 July	(Spain) Jerez	(Spain) Máximo Quiles	(Italy) Dodó Boggio	(Italy) Dodó Boggio
4	3 July	(Spain) Jerez	(Spain) Máximo Quiles	(Belgium) Lorenz Luciano	(Italy) Dodó Boggio
5	17 July	(Portugal) Portimão	(Italy) Dodó Boggio	(Spain) Máximo Quiles	(Spain) Brian Uriarte
6	9 October	(Spain) Aragón	(Spain) Máximo Quiles	(Italy) Guido Pini	(Italy) Guido Pini
6	9 October	(Spain) Aragón	(Spain) Máximo Quiles	(Spain) Brian Uriarte	(Republic of Ireland) Casey O'Gorman
7	30 October	(Spain) Valencia	(Republic of Ireland) Casey O'Gorman	(Spain) Joel Esteban	(Republic of Ireland) Casey O'Gorman

== Entry list ==
The permanent entry list was announced in April 2022.

Team	Constructor	No.	Rider	Rounds
(Italy) AC Racing Team	Honda	32	(Italy) Giulio Pugliese	2, 4, 7
(Italy) AC Racing Team	Honda	56	(Italy) Leonardo Zanni	7
(Italy) AC Racing Team	Honda	96	(Italy) Guido Pini	All
(Spain) AGR Team	Honda	14	(New Zealand) Cormac Buchanan	1–4
(Spain) AGR Team	Honda	50	(Australia) Carter Thompson	All
(Spain) Artbox	Honda	26	(Spain) Pau Alsina	All
(Spain) Artbox	Honda	36	(Australia) Angus Grenfell	All
(Spain) Artbox	Honda	53	(Hungary) Kevin Farkas	7
(Spain) Artbox	Honda	81	(Belgium) Lorenz Luciano	All
(Spain) Aspar Junior Team	Honda	47	(Italy) Dodò Boggio	All
(Spain) Aspar Junior Team	Honda	78	(Spain) Joel Esteban	1–3, 5–7
(Spain) Austin Racing VHC Team	Honda	22	(United Kingdom) Ben Austin	1–2
(Spain) Austin Racing VHC Team	Honda	34	(Spain) Beñat Fernández	All
(Spain) Austin Racing VHC Team	Honda	42	(United Kingdom) Ryan Frost	3
(Spain) Austin Racing VHC Team	Honda	68	(United States) Belladona Vaccarino	4
(Spain) Austin Racing VHC Team	Honda	69	(Spain) Fernando Bujosa	5–7
(Spain) Avintia Junior Team	Honda	15	(France) Jules Berçot	7
(Italy) Azimut Team Pileri	Honda	64	(Slovenia) Enej Krševan	1–2
(Italy) Azimut Team Pileri	Honda	65	(Italy) Fabiano Fiaccabrino	1–2
(France) BS Racing	Honda	33	(France) Enzo Bellon	All
(France) BS Racing	Honda	97	(France) Elliot Kassigian	7
(Spain) Cuna De Campeones	Honda	7	(India) Geoffrey Emmanuel	All
(Spain) Cuna De Campeones	Honda	11	(Spain) David González	5, 7
(Spain) Cuna De Campeones	Honda	89	(Italy) Demis Mihaila	2
Equipe De France; Equipe De France Vitesse	Honda	5	(France) Yannis Raingard	1–6
Equipe De France; Equipe De France Vitesse	Honda	29	(France) Rostagni Matthias	6–7
Equipe De France; Equipe De France Vitesse	Honda	63	(France) Benjamin Caillet	6–7
(Germany) F. Koch Rennsport	Honda	2	(Germany) Loris Schönrock	All
(Germany) F. Koch Rennsport	Honda	6	(Germany) Jona Eisenkolb	All
(Spain) Fau55 Tey Racing	Honda	18	(Spain) César Parrilla	All
(Spain) Fau55 Tey Racing	Honda	72	(Italy) Edoardo Liguori	7
(Spain) Fifty Motorsport	Honda	12	(Spain) Adriano Donoso	All
(Spain) Fifty Motorsport	Honda	23	(Greece) Spyros Fourthiotis	All
(Spain) Fifty Motorsport	Honda	58	(Spain) José Luis Armario	All
(Spain) Finetwork MIR Junior Team	Honda	19	(Spain) Pol Solá	6–7
(Spain) Finetwork MIR Junior Team	Honda	21	(South Africa) Ruché Moodley	All
(Spain) Finetwork MIR Junior Team	Honda	25	(Spain) Gonzalo Pérez	1–5
(Spain) Finetwork MIR Junior Team	Honda	54	(Spain) Alberto Ferrández	1–5
(Spain) First Bike Academy & Illusion Team 21	Honda	16	(Spain) Álvaro Fuertes	1, 3–7
(Spain) First Bike Academy & Illusion Team 21	Honda	17	(France) Elie Rousselot	1–3
(Spain) First Bike Academy & Illusion Team 21	Honda	24	(France) Guillem Planques	All
(Spain) First Bike Academy & Illusion Team 21	Honda	62	(Spain) Blai Trias	All
(Spain) H43Teamnobby	Honda	25	(Spain) Gonzalo Pérez	6–7
(Spain) Igax Team	Honda	41	(Spain) Yvonne Cerpa	All
(Spain) Igax Team	Honda	70	(United States) Kristian Daniel Jr.	All
(Poland) KidzGP by Covacha R.T.	Honda	52	(Poland) Jeremiasz Wojciechowski	1–3, 6–7
(Spain) KRT Academy	Honda	31	(Spain) Max Sánchez	4–5
(Spain) KRT Academy	Honda	88	(Hungary) Tibor Erik Varga	7
(France) Larresport	Honda	20	(Netherlands) Owen van Trigt	All
(France) Larresport	Honda	77	(France) Leandro Quintans	6–7
(France) Larresport	Honda	99	(Spain) Marc Aguilar	All
(Luxembourg) Leopard Impala Junior Team	Honda	71	(Qatar) Hamad Al Sahouti	1–6
(Germany) Liqui Moly Intact GP Junior Team	Honda	55	(Austria) Leo Rammerstorfer	5–7
(Germany) Liqui Moly Intact GP Junior Team	Honda	94	(Austria) Niklas Kitzbichler	1–3
(Portugal) LST Motorsports	Honda	73	(Portugal) Gonçalo Ribeiro	1–6
(United Kingdom) MDM-R Racing	Honda	82	(United Kingdom) Kyle Payne	2–3, 5–7
(France) Mediasystem	Honda	77	(France) Leandro Quintans	1–5
(Spain) MRE Talent	Honda	45	(Spain) Jesus Rios	All
(Malaysia) SIC Racing	Honda	13	(Malaysia) Hakim Danish	All
(Spain) SKX Cardoso Racing; Cardoso Racing	Honda	3	(Greece) Vasilios Panteleakis	All
(Netherlands) Stirlings Racing Team	Honda	35	(Netherlands) Matts Ruisbroek	1–2, 4, 7
(Spain) Team Estrella Galicia 0,0	Honda	27	(Finland) Rico Salmela	All
(Spain) Team Estrella Galicia 0,0	Honda	43	(United Kingdom) Amanuel Brinton	All
(Spain) Team Estrella Galicia 0,0	Honda	51	(Spain) Brian Uriarte	All
(Spain) Team Honda Laglisse	Honda	8	(Spain) Marco García	All
(Spain) Team Honda Laglisse	Honda	28	(Spain) Máximo Quiles	All
(France) Tecmas Racing Team	Honda	9	(France) Matteo Roman	2–7
(United Kingdom) Visiontrack Racing Team	Honda	57	(United Kingdom) Johnny Garness	1, 3–5, 7
(United Kingdom) Visiontrack Racing Team	Honda	67	(Republic of Ireland) Casey O'Gorman	All
(United Kingdom) Visiontrack Racing Team	Honda	74	(United Kingdom) Carter Brown	4–5
(United Kingdom) Visiontrack Racing Team	Honda	76	(United Kingdom) Evan Belford	6–7

== Championship standings ==
Points were awarded to the top fifteen riders, provided the rider finished the race.

Position	1st	2nd	3rd	4th	5th	6th	7th	8th	9th	10th	11th	12th	13th	14th	15th
Points	25	20	16	13	11	10	9	8	7	6	5	4	3	2	1

Pos.	Rider	EST (Portugal)		VAL (Spain)		BAR (Spain)	JER (Spain)		ALG (Portugal)	ARA (Spain)		VAL (Spain)	Pts
1	(Italy) Guido Pini	3	4	4	2	5	7	9	5	1^{F}	2	2	165
2	(Spain) Joel Esteban	1^{PF}	1^{PF}	1^{P}	DSQ^{P}	2^{P}			2	5	3	3^{F}	158
3	(Republic of Ireland) Casey O'Gorman	4	Ret	5	5	Ret	Ret	3	3	4	1	1^{P}	130
4	(Spain) Máximo Quiles	Ret	Ret	Ret	1	3	3^{P}	4^{P}	4^{F}	2^{P}	4^{P}	4	129
5	(Spain) Brian Uriarte	Ret	Ret	2	Ret	1	DSQ	DSQ	1	3	5^{F}	6	107
6	(Italy) Dodó Boggio	2	Ret	DNS	3^{F}	6	1^{F}	1	DNS^{P}	DNS	Ret	Ret	96
7	(Malaysia) Hakim Danish	5	2	8	12	10	2	10	Ret	10	9	16	88
8	(Finland) Rico Salmela	Ret	3	3^{F}	4	12	5	12	13	14	16	7	78
9	(Spain) Alberto Ferrández	Ret	6	6	6	7	9	2	7				75
10	(Spain) Jesús Rios	Ret	12	9	7	4	10	Ret	16	DNS	7	5	59
11	(South Africa) Ruché Moodley	Ret	7	11	Ret	11	4	7	11	11	15	18	52
12	(United Kingdom) Amanuel Brinton	Ret	8	7	10	9	11	5	15	19	17	15	48
13	(Australia) Carter Thompson	8	16	13	14	16	17	Ret	12	7	6	8	44
14	(Spain) Pau Alsina	7	9	12	9	24	16	13	14	DNS	10	10	44
15	(France) Guillem Planques	Ret	Ret	14	8	Ret	6	8	6	13	14	Ret	43
16	(Belgium) Lorenz Luciano	10	15	17	16	13	14	6^{F}	20	8	8	12	42
17	(Spain) César Parrilla	6	13	15	Ret	8^{F}	12	11	18	12	18	19	35
18	(Spain) Marco García	Ret	11	16	18	17	8	Ret	17	9	13	13	26
19	(Spain) Gonzalo Pérez	Ret	5	10	11	Ret	Ret	Ret	23	DNQ	DNQ	22	22
20	(United Kingdom) Johnny Garness	Ret	14			Ret	14	15	8			11	20
21	(Qatar) Hamad Al Sahouti	Ret	Ret	DNS	13	14	18	Ret	10	15	11		17
22	(Spain) David González								9			9	14
23	(Spain) Fernando Bujosa								DNQ	6	12	23	14
24	(Spain) Blai Trias	14	10	20	21	19	22	22	24	20	Ret	20	8
25	(Spain) Marc Aguilar	9	Ret	25	23	18	19	16	Ret	DNS	DNS	Ret	7
26	(Spain) José Luis Armario	11	19	18	22	21	24	Ret	25	24	25	DNQ	5
27	(Spain) Adriano Donoso	12	23	DNQ	DNQ	DNQ	DNQ	DNQ	DNQ	21	21	DNQ	4
28	(United States) Kristian Daniel Jr.	13	17	Ret	24	23	Ret	17	19	DNS	DNS	DNQ	3
29	(Italy) Giulio Pugliese			21	19		23	18				14	2
30	(Netherlands) Matts Ruisbroek	15	22	24	25		DNQ	DNQ				26	1
31	(Spain) Beñat Fernández	DNQ	DNQ	19	15	20	21	19	DNQ	16	Ret	21	1
32	(New Zealand) Cormac Buchanan	16	20	DNQ	DNQ	15	Ret	20					1
33	(Spain) Max Sánchez						15	21	DNQ				1
34	(France) Enzo Bellon	DNQ	18	DNQ	DNQ	DNQ	20	15	22	17	19	Ret	1
	(Netherlands) Owen van Trigt	Ret	21	23	17	DNQ	25	23	DNS	DNQ	DNQ	DNQ	0
	(Spain) Álvaro Fuertes	Ret	DNS			22	DNQ	DNQ	21	18	20	17	0
	(Italy) Demis Mihaila			22	20								0
	(Australia) Angus Grenfell	DNQ	DNQ	DNQ	DNQ	Ret	DNQ	DNQ	DNQ	22	24	25	0
	(Spain) Pol Solá									DNQ	22	DNQ	0
	(Austria) Leo Rammerstorfer								DNQ	23	23	DNQ	0
	(Italy) Edoardo Liguori											24	0
	(France) Matteo Roman			DNQ	DNQ	DNQ	DNQ	DNQ	Ret	DNQ	DNQ	DNQ	0
	(Spain) Yvonne Cerpa	DNQ	DNQ	DNQ	DNQ	DNQ	DNQ	DNQ	DNQ	DNQ	26	DNQ	0
	(Poland) Jeremiasz Wojciechowski	DNQ	DNQ	DNS	Ret	DNQ				DNQ	DNQ	DNQ	0
	(Greece) Vasilios Panteleakis	DNQ	DNQ	DNQ	DNQ	Ret	DNQ	DNQ	DNQ	DNQ	DNQ	DNQ	
	(United Kingdom) Evan Belford									DNS	DNS	DNQ	0
	(United Kingdom) Ben Austin	DNQ	DNQ	DNQ	DNQ								
	(France) Elie Rousselot	DNQ	DNQ	DNQ	DNQ	DNQ							
	(Slovenia) Enej Krševan	DNQ	DNQ	DNQ	DNQ								
	(Italy) Fabiano Fiaccabrino	DNQ	DNQ	DNQ	DNQ								
	(India) Geoffrey Emmanuel	DNQ	DNQ	DNQ	DNQ	DNQ	DNQ	DNQ	DNQ	DNQ	DNQ	DNQ	
	(Portugal) Gonçalo Ribeiro	DNQ	DNQ	DNQ	DNQ	DNQ	DNQ	DNQ	DNQ	DNQ	DNQ		
	(Germany) Jona Eisenkolb	DNQ	DNQ	DNQ	DNQ	DNQ	DNQ	DNQ	DNQ	DNQ	DNQ	DNQ	
	(France) Leandro Quintans	DNQ	DNQ	DNQ	DNQ	DNQ	DNQ	DNQ	DNQ	DNQ	DNQ	DNQ	
	(Germany) Loris Schönrock	DNQ	DNQ	DNQ	DNQ	DNQ	DNQ	DNQ	DNQ	DNQ	DNQ	DNQ	
	(Austria) Niklas Kitzbichler	DNQ	DNQ	DNQ	DNQ	DNQ							
	(Greece) Spyros Fourthiotis	DNQ	DNQ	DNQ	DNQ	DNQ	DNQ	DNQ	DNQ	DNQ	DNQ	DNQ	
	(France) Yannis Raingard	DNQ	DNQ	DNQ	DNQ	DNQ	DNQ	DNQ	DNQ	DNQ	DNQ		
	(United Kingdom) Kyle Payne			DNQ	DNQ	DNQ			DNQ	DNQ	DNQ	DNQ	
	(United Kingdom) Ryan Frost					DNQ							
	(United States) Belladona Vaccarino						DNQ	DNQ					
	(United Kingdom) Carter Brown						DNQ	DNQ	DNQ				
	(France) Benjamin Caillet									DNQ	DNQ	DNQ	
	(France) Rostagni Matthias									DNQ	DNQ	DNQ	
	(France) Elliot Kassigian											DNQ	
	(France) Jules Berçot											DNQ	
	(Hungary) Kevin Farkas											DNQ	
	(Italy) Leonardo Zanni											DNQ	
	(Hungary) Tibor Erik Varga											DNQ	
Pos.	Rider	EST (Portugal)		VAL (Spain)		BAR (Spain)	JER (Spain)		ALG (Portugal)	ARA (Spain)		VAL (Spain)	Points

Colour	Result
Gold	Winner
Silver	Second place
Bronze	Third place
Green	Points classification
Blue	Non-points classification
Blue	Non-classified finish (NC)
Purple	Retired, not classified (Ret)
Red	Did not qualify (DNQ)
Red	Did not pre-qualify (DNPQ)
Black	Disqualified (DSQ)
White	Did not start (DNS)
White	Withdrew (WD)
White	Race cancelled (C)
Blank	Did not practice (DNP)
Blank	Did not arrive (DNA)
Blank	Excluded (EX)

P – Pole position
F – Fastest lap
