= 2025 FIM JuniorGP World Championship =

Junior Motorcycle World Championship

2025 FIM JuniorGP World Championship
Previous:	2024	Next:	2026
Support series: FIM Moto2 European Championship; Stock European Championship; European Talent Cup

The 2025 FIM JuniorGP World Championship was the fourteenth season of the class, and the fourth season after leaving the historical connection to CEV. The season was held over 12 races at 7 meetings, beginning on 4 May at Estoril and ending on 23 November at Valencia.

The season was marred by the death of Spanish rider Pau Alsina ahead of the Aragon round.

== Calendar and results ==
The provisional calendar was announced in October 2024.

round	Date	Circuit	Pole position	Fastest lap	Race winner	Winning team	ref
1	4 May	(Portugal) Estoril	(Finland) Rico Salmela	(Spain) Brian Uriarte	(Spain) Brian Uriarte	(Spain) Seventytwo Artbox Racing Team	
2	1 June	(Spain) Jerez	(Spain) Brian Uriarte	(Finland) Rico Salmela	(Spain) Brian Uriarte	(Spain) Seventytwo Artbox Racing Team	
2	1 June	(Spain) Jerez	(Spain) Brian Uriarte	(Spain) Jesús Rios	(Spain) Brian Uriarte	(Spain) Seventytwo Artbox Racing Team	
3	6 July	(France) Magny-Cours	(Spain) Brian Uriarte	(Spain) Joel Esteban	(Spain) Joel Esteban	(Spain) Aspar Junior Team	
4	27 July	(Spain) Aragón	(Spain) Brian Uriarte	(Spain) Jesús Rios	(Italy) Leonardo Zanni	(Spain) Finetwork Mir Racing Team	
4	27 July	(Spain) Aragón	(Spain) Brian Uriarte	(Finland) Rico Salmela	(Spain) Brian Uriarte	(Spain) Seventytwo Artbox Racing Team	
5	21 September	(Italy) Misano	(Spain) Brian Uriarte	(Argentina) Marco Morelli	(Argentina) Marco Morelli	(United Kingdom) MLav Racing	
5	21 September	(Italy) Misano	(Spain) Brian Uriarte	(Spain) Brian Uriarte	(Spain) Brian Uriarte	(Spain) Seventytwo Artbox Racing Team	
6	2 November	(Spain) Barcelona	(Spain) Brian Uriarte	(Spain) Brian Uriarte	(Spain) Jesús Rios	(Spain) Finetwork Mir Racing Team	
6	2 November	(Spain) Barcelona	(Spain) Brian Uriarte	(Argentina) Marco Morelli	(Argentina) Marco Morelli	(United Kingdom) MLav Racing	
7	23 November	(Spain) Valencia	(Argentina) Marco Morelli	(Argentina) Marco Morelli	(Argentina) Marco Morelli	(United Kingdom) MLav Racing	
7	23 November	(Spain) Valencia	(Argentina) Marco Morelli	(Spain) Jesús Rios	(Argentina) Marco Morelli	(United Kingdom) MLav Racing	

== Entry list ==
2025 entry list
Team	Constructor	No.	Rider	Rounds
(Spain) Aspar Junior Team	CFMoto	4	(United Kingdom) Sullivan Mounsey	All
(Spain) Aspar Junior Team	CFMoto	31	(Italy) Giulio Pugliese	All
(Spain) Aspar Junior Team	CFMoto	78	(Spain) Joel Esteban	All
(Japan) Asia Talent Team	Honda	32	(Japan) Zen Mitani	All
(Indonesia) Astra Honda Racing Team	Honda	9	(Indonesia) Veda Pratama	All
(United Kingdom) British Talent Team	Honda	29	(United Kingdom) Lucas Brown	All
Honda Racing Thailand	Honda	85	(Thailand) Kiattisak Singhapong	All
(United Kingdom) MLav Racing	Honda	52	(United Kingdom) Evan Belford	All
(United Kingdom) MLav Racing	Honda	97	(Argentina) Marco Morelli	All
(Spain) Team Estrella Galicia 0,0	Honda	26	(Spain) Pau Alsina	1–3
(Spain) Team Estrella Galicia 0,0	Honda	27	(Finland) Rico Salmela	All
(Spain) Team Estrella Galicia 0,0	Honda	47	(Italy) Dodo Boggio	3–7
(Spain) Team Estrella Galicia 0,0	Honda	67	(Republic of Ireland) Casey O'Gorman	All
(Spain) STV Laglisse Racing	Husqvarna	55	(France) Randy Truchot	6–7
(Italy) AC Racing Team A.S.D. AC Racing KidzGP Team	KTM	11	(Spain) David González	All
(Italy) AC Racing Team A.S.D. AC Racing KidzGP Team	KTM	72	(Italy) Edoardo Liguori	1
(Italy) AC Racing Team A.S.D. AC Racing KidzGP Team	KTM	90	(Vietnam) Luca Agostinelli	1–2, 4–5
(Italy) AC Racing Team A.S.D. AC Racing KidzGP Team	KTM	92	(Poland) Jeremi Wojciechowski	3, 6–7
(Spain) AGR Team	KTM	20	(Netherlands) Owen van Trigt	1–5
(Spain) AGR Team	KTM	36	(Spain) Beatriz Neila	6–7
(Spain) AGR Team	KTM	37	(Australia) Marianos Nikolis	All
(Spain) AGR Team	KTM	41	(Spain) Yvonne Cerpa	2–5
(Spain) AGR Team	KTM	45	(South Africa) Kgopotso Mononyane	All
(Spain) AGR Team	KTM	70	(United States) Kristian Daniel Jr.	6–7
(France) CIP Green Power Junior Team	KTM	33	(France) Enzo Bellon	1, 3–7
(Italy) ASD Eagle-1 Team; Eagle-1 Team	KTM	7	(Spain) Beñat Fernández	3–4
(Italy) ASD Eagle-1 Team; Eagle-1 Team	KTM	8	(Italy) Edoardo Bertola	1–4, 6–7
(Italy) ASD Eagle-1 Team; Eagle-1 Team	KTM	34	(Italy) Cesare Tiezzi	2, 4–7
(Italy) ASD Eagle-1 Team; Eagle-1 Team	KTM	47	(Italy) Dodo Boggio	1–2
(Spain) Finetwork Mir Racing Team	KTM	10	(Spain) Adrián Cruces	6–7
(Spain) Finetwork Mir Racing Team	KTM	54	(Spain) Jesús Rios	All
(Spain) Finetwork Mir Racing Team	KTM	57	(Italy) Leonardo Zanni	All
(Germany) F.Koch Rennsport	KTM	2	(Germany) Loris Schönrock	All
(Poland) KidzGP by Covacha R.T.	KTM	92	(Poland) Jeremi Wojciechowski	1–2
(Italy) MTA Junior Team	KTM	5	(Austria) Leo Rammerstorfer	All
(Italy) MTA Junior Team	KTM	25	(Italy) Leonardo Abruzzo	All
(Italy) MTA Junior Team	KTM	48	(Switzerland) Lenoxx Phommara	2–7
(Italy) MTA Junior Team	KTM	70	(United States) Kristian Daniel Jr.	1
(Italy) MTA Junior Team	KTM	91	(Japan) Kotaro Uchiumi	All
(Spain) Seventytwo Artbox Racing Team	KTM	28	(Hungary) Kevin Farkas	All
(Spain) Seventytwo Artbox Racing Team	KTM	51	(Spain) Brian Uriarte	All
(Spain) SF Racing	KTM	12	(Australia) Levi Russo	5
(Malaysia) SIC Racing-MSI	KTM	13	(Malaysia) Hakim Danish	All
(Italy) Team Echovit Pasini Racing	KTM	21	(Italy) Erik Michielon	All

== Championship' standings ==
Scoring system

Points were awarded to the top fifteen finishers. Rider had to finish the race to earn points.

Position	1st	2nd	3rd	4th	5th	6th	7th	8th	9th	10th	11th	12th	13th	14th	15th
Points	25	20	16	13	11	10	9	8	7	6	5	4	3	2	1

=== Riders' championship ===
Pos.	Rider	Bike	EST (Portugal)	JER (Spain)		MAG (France)	ARA (Spain)		MIS (Italy)		CAT (Spain)		VAL (Spain)		Points
1	(Spain) Brian Uriarte	KTM	1^{F}	1^{P}	1^{P}	10^{P}	8^{P}	1^{P}	2^{P}	1^{P F}	2^{P F}	2^{P}	2	2	239
2	(Argentina) Marco Morelli	Honda	7	8	13	5	9	3	1^{F}	3	4	1^{F}	1^{PF}	1^{P}	183
3	(Spain) Joel Esteban	CFMoto	9	5	9	1^{F}	5	5	5	4	8	3	6	3	146
4	(Spain) Jesús Rios	KTM	Ret	3	2^{F}	18	Ret^{F}	7	6	2	1	5	3	6^{F}	137
5	(Finland) Rico Salmela	Honda	3^{P}	2^{F}	3	3	3	4^{F}	Ret	DSQ	3	7	4	25	135
6	(Republic of Ireland) Casey O'Gorman	Honda	Ret	6	6	2	2	2	9	7	5	4	Ret	4	133
7	(Italy) Leonardo Zanni	KTM	4	4	4	20	1	6	16	9	10	10	8	5	112
8	(Malaysia) Hakim Danish	KTM	2	9	5	29	4	Ret	15	11	9	6	9	8	89
9	(Spain) David González	KTM	6	Ret	7	6	7	28	3	6	16	WD	5	Ret	75
10	(Indonesia) Veda Pratama	Honda	Ret	21	21	12	6	8	4	5	6	8	10	Ret	70
11	(Japan) Zen Mitani	Honda	8	14	11	9	12	9	8	8	7	9	13	16	68
12	(Italy) Giulio Pugliese	CFMoto	5	7	10	23	10	15	10	12	15	23	11	10	55
13	(United Kingdom) Evan Belford	Honda	11	Ret	23	7	16	16	7	17	11	11	17	9	40
14	(Austria) Leo Rammerstorfer	KTM	10	10	16	4	19	13	13	13	29	14	Ret	14	38
15	(United Kingdom) Sullivan Mounsey	CFMoto	Ret	13	12	Ret	Ret	12	12	Ret	19	13	12	12	26
16	(Italy) Dodo Boggio	KTM	Ret	20	15										23
16	(Italy) Dodo Boggio	Honda				13	Ret	11	Ret	NC	12	12	15	11	23
17	(Spain) Adrián Cruces	KTM									13	DSQ	7	7	21
18	(Italy) Leonardo Abruzzo	KTM	14	12	25	8	26	22	18	16	14	Ret	20	20	16
19	(Spain) Beñat Fernández	KTM				11	11	10							16
20	(Spain) Pau Alsina	Honda	Ret	11	8	14									15
21	(Switzerland) Lenoxx Phommara	KTM		18	14	16	22	25	14	10	20	18	19	15	11
22	(South Africa) Kgopotso Mononyane	KTM	Ret	15	24	DSQ	Ret	23	11	14	21	19	16	13	11
23	(Thailand) Kiattisak Singhapong	Honda	12	17	17	17	15	14	19	18	28	15	18	Ret	8
24	(France) Enzo Bellon	KTM	13			Ret	17	20	17	15	17	16	14	Ret	6
25	(Italy) Erik Michielon	KTM	18	25	20	21	13	21	Ret	DNS	22	22	22	17	3
26	(Australia) Marianos Nikolis	KTM	Ret	16	18	22	14	17	Ret	20	18	26	23	Ret	2
27	(United Kingdom) Lucas Brown	Honda	17	27	27	15	23	Ret	25	24	25	Ret	21	22	1
28	(Hungary) Kevin Farkas	KTM	15	19	19	24	18	18	21	19	Ret	20	24	19	1
29	(Japan) Kotaro Uchiumi	KTM	16	22	22	27	20	24	26	22	26	21	25	18	0
30	(United States) Kristian Daniel Jr.	KTM	Ret								23	17	Ret	21	0
31	(Vietnam) Luca Agostinelli	KTM	Ret	24	Ret		Ret	19	20	Ret					0
32	(Italy) Edoardo Bertola	KTM	21	26	28	19	21	26			27	24	27	24	0
33	(Netherlands) Owen van Trigt	KTM	19	23	26	25	DNS	27	22	21					0
34	(Italy) Edoardo Liguori	KTM	20												0
35	(Italy) Cesare Tiezzi	KTM		29	29		DNPQ	DNPQ	23	24	24	25	26	23	0
36	(Spain) Yvonne Cerpa	KTM		28	Ret	26	25	30	24	25					0
37	(Germany) Loris Schönrock	KTM	DNQ	DNQ	DNQ	28	24	29	27	Ret	30	27	29	27	0
38	(France) Randy Truchot	Husqvarna									31	28	28	26	0
39	(Australia) Levi Russo	KTM							28	Ret					0
40	(Poland) Jeremi Wojciechowski	KTM	Ret	30	Ret	WD					DNQ	29	DNQ	DNQ	0
	(Spain) Beatriz Neila	KTM									DNQ	DNQ	DNQ	DNQ	
Pos.	Rider	Bike	EST (Portugal)	JER (Spain)		MAG (France)	ARA (Spain)		MIS (Italy)		CAT (Spain)		VAL (Spain)		Points

Colour	Result
Gold	Winner
Silver	Second place
Bronze	Third place
Green	Points classification
Blue	Non-points classification
Blue	Non-classified finish (NC)
Purple	Retired, not classified (Ret)
Red	Did not qualify (DNQ)
Red	Did not pre-qualify (DNPQ)
Black	Disqualified (DSQ)
White	Did not start (DNS)
White	Withdrew (WD)
White	Race cancelled (C)
Blank	Did not practice (DNP)
Blank	Did not arrive (DNA)
Blank	Excluded (EX)

P – Pole position
F – Fastest lap
