= 2023 European Talent Cup =

European Talent Cup

2023 European Talent Cup
Previous:	2022	Next:	2024
Support series: FIM JuniorGP World Championship; FIM Moto2 European Championship; FIM Stock European Championship

The 2023 European Talent Cup is the seventh season of the European Talent Cup series. Máximo Quiles is the champion after beating closest rival Guido Pini.

== Race calendar and results ==
The provisional calendar was published in November 2022.

Round	Date	Circuit	Pole position	Fastest lap	Race winner	Team	ref
1	7 May	Estoril	(Spain) Brian Uriarte	(Spain) David Gonzalez	(Spain) Brian Uriarte	Team Estrella Galicia 0,0	
1	7 May	Estoril	(Spain) Brian Uriarte	(Spain) David Gonzalez	(Spain) Brian Uriarte	Team Estrella Galicia 0,0	
2	21 May	Valencia	(Spain) Brian Uriarte	(Spain) Máximo Quiles	(Spain) Máximo Quiles	Aspar Junior Team	
2	21 May	Valencia	(Spain) Máximo Quiles	(Spain) Máximo Quiles	(Spain) Máximo Quiles	Aspar Junior Team	
3	4 June	Jerez	(Spain) Máximo Quiles	(Spain) Jesus Torres	(Spain) Máximo Quiles	Aspar Junior Team	
3	4 June	Jerez	(Spain) Máximo Quiles	(Malaysia) Hakim Danish	(Spain) Brian Uriarte	Team Estrella Galicia 0,0	
4	2 July	Portimão	(Spain) Máximo Quiles	(South Africa) Ruché Moodley	(Italy) Dodó Boggio	Aspar Junior Team	
5	16 July	Barcelona	(Spain) Brian Uriarte	(Spain) Máximo Quiles	(Italy) Guido Pini	AC Racing Team	
6	8 October	Aragón	(Spain) Máximo Quiles	(South Africa) Ruché Moodley	(Spain) Máximo Quiles	Aspar Junior Team	
6	8 October	Aragón	(Spain) Máximo Quiles	(South Africa) Ruché Moodley	(Spain) Máximo Quiles	Aspar Junior Team	
7	5 November	Valencia	(Spain) Jesús Rios	(Argentina) Valentin Perrone	(Italy) Guido Pini	AC Racing Team	

== Entry list ==
Team	Constructor	No.	Rider	Rounds
(Italy) AC Racing Team	Honda	1	(Italy) Guido Pini	All
(Italy) AC Racing Team	Honda	18	(Italy) Edoardo Bertola	All
(Italy) AC Racing Team	Honda	31	(Italy) Giulio Pugliese	All
(Spain) AGR Team	Honda	20	(Netherlands) Owen van Trigt	All
(Spain) AGR Team	Honda	50	(Australia) Carter Thompson	1, 4–5
(Spain) AGR Team	Honda	91	(Portugal) Afonso Almeida	7
(Spain) Artbox	Honda	3	(Greece) Vasilis Panteleakis	All
(Spain) Artbox	Honda	14	(Spain) Edu Gutiérrez	4–7
(Spain) Artbox	Honda	26	(Spain) Pau Alsina	All
(Spain) Artbox	Honda	81	(Belgium) Lorenz Luciano	1–3, 5–7
(Spain) Aspar Junior Team	Honda	28	(Spain) Máximo Quiles	All
(Spain) Aspar Junior Team	Honda	47	(Italy) Dodó Boggio	All
(France) Brechon Racing School	Honda	78	(France) Henri Mignot	7
(France) BS Racing (France) MB38 by Mecasport	Honda	30	(France) Matthias Rostagni	2
(France) BS Racing (France) MB38 by Mecasport	Honda	33	(France) Enzo Bellon	All
(Spain) Cuna de Campeones	Honda	5	(India) Johann Emmanuel	1–4
(Spain) Cuna de Campeones	Honda	11	(Spain) David González	1–4, 6–7
(Spain) Cuna de Campeones	Honda	22	(Spain) Jesús Torres	All
(Netherlands) Ernst Dubbink Eveno Racing	Honda	53	(Netherlands) Kiyano Veijer	All
(Spain) Fau55 Tey Racing	Honda	19	(Slovakia) Ladislav Lörinc	All
(Spain) Fifty Motorsport	Honda	23	(Greece) Spyros Fourthiotis	1–5
(Spain) Finetwork Mir Junior Team	Honda	21	(South Africa) Ruché Moodley	1–2, 4–6
(Spain) Finetwork Mir Junior Team	Honda	92	(Spain) Joel Pons	7
(Spain) Finetwork Mir Junior Team	Honda	93	(Spain) Alberto Ferrández	1–4
(Spain) Finetwork Mir Junior Team	Honda	95	(Italy) Leonardo Zanni	3, 5–7
(France) First Bike Academy	Honda	24	(France) Guillem Planques	1, 3–7
(Spain) Frando Racing VHC Team	Honda	7	(Spain) Beñat Fernández	All
(Spain) Frando Racing VHC Team	Honda	34	(United States) Britanni Vaccarino	1, 5
(Spain) Frando Racing VHC Team	Honda	69	(Spain) Fernando Bujosa	6
(Spain) Frando Racing VHC Team	Honda	73	(Argentina) Valentin Perrone	4, 6–7
(Spain) Frando Racing VHC Team	Honda	76	(United Kingdom) Rhys Stephenson	2
(Germany) F.Koch Rennsport	Honda	2	(Germany) Loris Schönrock	All
(Germany) F.Koch Rennsport	Honda	8	(Germany) Jona Eisenkolb	All
(Germany) F.Koch Rennsport	Honda	10	(Germany) Valentino Herrlich	All
(Spain) Igaxteam	Honda	17	(Spain) Pedro Alomar	All
(Spain) Igaxteam	Honda	90	(Vietnam) Luca Agostinelli	All
(United Kingdom) Illusion Racing	Honda	37	(Australia) Marianos Nikolis	1–5, 7
(United Kingdom) Illusion Racing	Honda	82	(United Kingdom) Kyle Payne	All
(Spain) JEG Racing	Honda	38	(France) Matteo Roman	1–2, 4–7
(Spain) JEG Racing	Honda	42	(Denmark) Julius Frellsen	6–7
(Poland) KidzGP by Covacha R.T.	Honda	52	(Poland) Jeremiasz Wojciechowski	All
(Germany) Liqui Moly Husqvarna Intact GP Junior Team	Honda	4	(Germany) Rocco Sessler	6–7
(Germany) Liqui Moly Husqvarna Intact GP Junior Team	Honda	88	(Saudi Arabia) Mohammed Abdal Aziz	All
(France) Mecaprojets Team Ado	Honda	9	(France) Elliot Kassigian	All
(France) Mecaprojets Team Ado	Honda	30	(France) Matthias Rostagni	1, 3, 5–7
(France) Mecaprojets Team Ado	Honda	99	(France) Rémy Sanjuan	1–2
(United Kingdom) Microlise Cresswell Racing	Honda	40	(United States) Julian Correa	3, 7
(United Kingdom) Microlise Cresswell Racing	Honda	55	(United Kingdom) Harrison Dessoy	3
(United Kingdom) Microlise Cresswell Racing	Honda	66	(United Kingdom) Peter Willis	7
(United Kingdom) Microlise Cresswell Racing	Honda	96	(Ukraine) Sviatoslav Pylypenko	3
(Spain) MMG-Pinamoto RS	Honda	69	(Spain) Fernando Bujosa	5, 7
(Malaysia) Monlau Motul	Honda	13	(Malaysia) Hakim Danish	All
(Spain) MRE Talent	Honda	54	(Spain) Jesús Rios	2–7
(Spain) MRE Talent	Honda	70	(United States) Kristian Daniel Jr.	All
(Italy) Pasini Racing - Dodici Motorsport	Honda	72	(Italy) Edoardo Liguori	1–4, 6–7
(Spain) Superhugo44 Team	Honda	6	(France) Benjamin Caillet	4–5, 7
(Spain) Superhugo44 Team	Honda	14	(Spain) Edu Gutiérrez	1–3
(Spain) Superhugo44 Team	Honda	16	(Spain) Max Sánchez	5
(Spain) Superhugo44 Team	Honda	58	(Spain) José Luis Armario	3–4
(Spain) Superhugo44 Team	Honda	67	(Republic of Ireland) Casey O'Gorman	4–5
(Italy) SF Racing	Honda	15	(Italy) Erik Michielon	7
(Italy) SF Racing	Honda	29	(Italy) Massimo Coppa	3–5
(Italy) SF Racing	Honda	32	(Indonesia) Pandu Padmogani	1–2, 4–6
(Italy) SF Racing	Honda	35	(Italy) Pier Venturini	7
(Spain) Team Estrella Galicia 0,0	Honda	27	(Finland) Rico Salmela	All
(Spain) Team Estrella Galicia 0,0	Honda	43	(United Kingdom) Amanuel Brinton	All
(Spain) Team Estrella Galicia 0,0	Honda	51	(Spain) Brian Uriarte	1–3, 5–7
(Spain) Team Honda Laglisse	Honda	12	(Spain) Adriano Donoso	All
(Spain) Team Honda Laglisse	Honda	41	(Spain) Yvonne Cerpa	All
(Spain) Team Impala Honda	Honda	71	(Qatar) Hamad Al Sahouti	1, 4–7
(France) Team Larresport	Honda	25	(Spain) Gonzalo Pérez	All
(France) Team Larresport	Honda	73	(Argentina) Valentin Perrone	3, 5
(France) Team Larresport	Honda	77	(France) Leandro Quintans	1–5, 7
(France) Team Larresport	Honda	94	(Spain) Marc Aguilar	1–2
(France) Viltaïs Racing Junior	Honda	6	(France) Benjamin Caillet	1–3, 6
(United Kingdom) Visiontrack Racing Team	Honda	55	(United Kingdom) Harrison Dessoy	4–5
(United Kingdom) Visiontrack Racing Team	Honda	56	(United Kingdom) Evan Belford	6–7
(United Kingdom) Visiontrack Racing Team	Honda	67	(Republic of Ireland) Casey O'Gorman	1–3
(United Kingdom) Visiontrack Racing Team	Honda	76	(United Kingdom) Rhys Stephenson	3
(United Kingdom) Visiontrack Racing Team	Honda	84	(United Kingdom) Sullivan Mounsey	7
(United Kingdom) Visiontrack Racing Team	Honda	97	(Argentina) Marco Morelli	5–6
Entry lists:

== Championship standings ==
Points were awarded to the top fifteen riders, provided the rider finished the race.

Position	**1st**	**2nd**	**3rd**	**4th**	**5th**	**6th**	**7th**	**8th**	**9th**	**10th**	**11th**	**12th**	**13th**	**14th**	**15th**
Points	25	20	16	13	11	10	9	8	7	6	5	4	3	2	1

=== Riders' standings ===
Pos.	Rider	EST (Portugal)		VAL (Spain)		JER (Spain)		ALG (Portugal)	BAR (Spain)	ARA (Spain)		VAL (Spain)	Pts
1	(Spain) Máximo Quiles	4	2	1	**1**	**1**	**3**	**27**	Ret	**1**	**1**	4	187
2	(Italy) Guido Pini	8	Ret	2	6	3	2	3	1	5	3	1	167
3	(Spain) Brian Uriarte	**1**	**1**	**8**	2	2	1		**16**	2	4	Ret	156
4	(Finland) Rico Salmela	2	6	3	7	5	7	4	Ret	4	8	Ret	109
5	(Italy) Dodó Boggio	11	4	4	4	4	4	1	Ret	10	9	Ret	108
6	(Spain) Jesús Rios			Ret	5	8	Ret	6	15	3	2	**3**	82
7	(Spain) David González	7	3	10	10	12	5	Ret		8	19	6	70
8	(Spain) Jesús Torres	15	7	13	9	9	8	11	4	12	11	8	70
9	(France) Guillem Planques	12	10			10	9	8	6	13	7	5	64
10	(South Africa) Ruché Moodley	5	8	WD	WD			5	3	Ret	5		57
11	(Spain) Alberto Ferrández	Ret	5	Ret	3	6	6	10					53
12	(Spain) Adriano Donoso	13	16	6	15	Ret	12	13	8	6	13	7	51
13	(Republic of Ireland) Casey O'Gorman	DNS	DNS	Ret	DNS	7	Ret	2	2				49
14	(Spain) Pau Alsina	9	13	7	14	16	15	7	22	7	14	12	46
15	(Italy) Giulio Pugliese	6	NC	5	8	23	22	DNS	10	Ret	16	11	40
16	(Spain) Beñat Fernández	10	12	16	11	17	11	9	9	Ret	23	Ret	34
17	(Malaysia) Hakim Danish	3	Ret	11	13	Ret	26	20	17	21	18	10	30
18	(Italy) Leonardo Zanni					13	10		Ret	14	6	9	28
19	(Argentina) Valentin Perrone					19	14	21	DNQ	15	15	2	24
20	(United States) Kristian Daniel Jr.	DNQ	DNQ	12	Ret	DNQ	DNQ	26	7	11	12	Ret	22
21	(United Kingdom) Amanuel Brinton	19	17	9	19	11	Ret	14	11	17	17	Ret	19
22	(Argentina) Marco Morelli								5	9	Ret		18
23	(Italy) Edoardo Liguori	16	18	Ret	12	20	13	16		16	10	16	13
24	(Qatar) Hamad Al Sahouti	Ret	11					12	12	DNQ	DNQ	DNQ	13
25	(Belgium) Lorenz Luciano	14	9	Ret	Ret	Ret	Ret		DNS	Ret	Ret	18	9
26	(Spain) Gonzalo Pérez	17	15	Ret	20	14	16	15	DNQ	18	21	15	5
27	(Spain) Edu Gutiérrez	DNQ	DNQ	18	25	DNQ	DNQ	18	13	Ret	26	19	3
28	(Spain) Fernando Bujosa								Ret	23	22	13	3
29	(Spain) Pedro Alomar	Ret	21	14	16	15	18	DNQ	DNQ	DNQ	DNQ	17	3
30	(Australia) Carter Thompson	Ret	14					19	Ret				2
31	(Greece) Vasilis Panteleakis	26	26	DNQ	DNQ	DNQ	DNQ	25	14	22	25	DNQ	2
32	(France) Enzo Bellon	20	Ret	Ret	24	25	25	22	DNQ	Ret	24	14	2
33	(Netherlands) Owen van Trigt	23	25	15	21	18	17	28	18	DNQ	DNQ	20	1
34	(France) Leandro Quintans	DNQ	DNQ	17	27	DNQ	DNQ	DNQ	DNQ			DNQ	0
35	(Spain) Marc Aguilar	22	20	Ret	17								0
36	(France) Matteo Roman	21	22	Ret	DNS			17	Ret	20	Ret	Ret	0
37	(Vietnam) Luca Agostinelli	18	19	19	18	22	24	23	DNQ	DNQ	DNQ	DNQ	0
38	(Australia) Marianos Nikolis	DNQ	DNQ	Ret	22	21	19	DNQ	DNQ			22	0
39	(Germany) Valentino Herrlich	DNQ	DNQ	Ret	23	DNQ	DNQ	DNS	19	DNQ	DNQ	DNQ	0
40	(France) Benjamin Caillet	25	23	DNQ	DNQ	DNQ	DNQ	DNQ	DNQ	19	20	DNQ	0
41	(Italy) Edoardo Bertola	24	24	DNQ	DNQ	24	20	DNQ	21	DNQ	DNQ	DNQ	0
42	(Spain) Yvonne Cerpa	DNQ	DNQ	DNQ	26	26	21	DNQ	20	DNQ	DNQ	DNQ	0
43	(France) Elliot Kassigian	DNQ	DNQ	DNQ	DNQ	DNQ	DNQ	DNQ	DNQ	DNQ	DNQ	21	0
44	(Poland) Jeremiasz Wojciechowski	DNQ	DNQ	DNQ	DNQ	Ret	23	DNQ	DNQ	WD	WD	DNQ	0
45	(Spain) Joel Pons											23	0
46	(Germany) Rocco Sessler									Ret	29	DNQ	0
	(Germany) Jona Eisenkolb	DNQ	DNQ	DNQ	DNQ	DNQ	DNQ	DNQ	DNQ	DNQ	DNQ	DNQ	
	(Netherlands) Kiyano Veijer	DNQ	DNQ	DNQ	DNQ	DNQ	DNQ	DNQ	DNQ	DNQ	DNQ	DNQ	
	(United Kingdom) Kyle Payne	DNQ	DNQ	DNQ	DNQ	DNQ	DNQ	DNQ	DNQ	DNQ	DNQ	DNQ	
	(Slovakia) Ladislav Lörinc	DNQ	DNQ	DNQ	DNQ	DNQ	DNQ	DNQ	DNQ	DNQ	DNQ	DNQ	
	(Germany) Loris Schönrock	DNQ	DNQ	DNQ	DNQ	DNQ	DNQ	DNQ	DNQ	DNQ	DNQ	DNQ	
	(Saudi Arabia) Mohammed Abdal Aziz	DNQ	DNQ	DNQ	DNQ	DNQ	DNQ	DNQ	DNQ	DNQ	DNQ	DNQ	
	(France) Matthias Rostagni	DNQ	DNQ	DNQ	DNQ	DNQ	DNQ		DNQ	DNQ	DNQ	DNQ	
	(Greece) Spyros Fourthiotis	DNQ	DNQ	DNQ	DNQ	DNQ	DNQ	DNQ	DNQ				
	(Indonesia) Pandu Padmogani	DNQ	DNQ	DNQ	DNQ			DNQ	DNQ	DNQ	DNQ		
	(India) Johann Emmanuel	DNQ	DNQ	DNQ	DNQ	DNQ	DNQ	DNQ					
	(France) Rémy Sanjuan	DNQ	DNQ	DNQ	DNQ								
	(United Kingdom) Rhys Stephenson			DNQ	DNQ	DNQ	DNQ						
	(United Kingdom) Harrison Desoy					DNQ	DNQ	DNQ	DNQ				
	(Italy) Massimo Coppa					DNQ	DNQ	DNQ	DNQ				
	(Spain) José Luis Armario					DNQ	DNQ	DNQ					
	(United States) Julian Correa					DNQ	DNQ					DNQ	
	(United Kingdom) Evan Belford									DNQ	DNQ	DNQ	
	(Denmark) Julius Frellsen									DNQ	DNQ	DNQ	
	(Ukraine) Sviatoslav Pylypenko					DNQ	DNQ						
	(United States) Britanni Vaccarino	WD	WD						DNQ				
	(Spain) Max Sánchez								DNQ				
	(Portugal) Afonso Almeida											DNQ	
	(Italy) Erik Michielon											DNQ	
	(France) Henri Mignot											DNQ	
	(United Kingdom) Peter Willis											DNQ	
	(Italy) Pier Venturini											DNQ	
	(United Kingdom) Sullivan Mounsey											DNQ	
Pos.	Rider	EST (Portugal)		VAL (Spain)		JER (Spain)		POR (Portugal)	CAT (Spain)	ARA (Spain)		VAL (Spain)	Points

Colour	Result
Gold	Winner
Silver	Second place
Bronze	Third place
Green	Points classification
Blue	Non-points classification
Blue	Non-classified finish (NC)
Purple	Retired, not classified (Ret)
Red	Did not qualify (DNQ)
Red	Did not pre-qualify (DNPQ)
Black	Disqualified (DSQ)
White	Did not start (DNS)
White	Withdrew (WD)
White	Race cancelled (C)
Blank	Did not practice (DNP)
Blank	Did not arrive (DNA)
Blank	Excluded (EX)

**Bold** – Pole position
Italic – Fastest lap
