= 2025 European Talent Cup =

Junior Motorcycle World Championship

2025 European Talent Cup
Previous:	2024	Next:	2026
Support series: FIM JuniorGP World Championship; FIM Moto2 European Championship; Stock European Championship

The 2025 European Talent Cup was the ninth season of the class, the season was held over 11 races at 7 meetings, beginning on 4 May at Estoril and ending on 23 November at Valencia.

== Calendar and results ==
The provisional calendar was announced in October 2024.

round	Date	Circuit	Pole position	Fastest lap	Race winner	Winning constructor	ref
1	4 May	(Portugal) Estoril	(Spain) Carlos Cano	(Spain) Álex Longarela	(Spain) Fernando Bujosa	(Italy) AC Racing Team A.S.D.	
1	4 May	(Portugal) Estoril	(Spain) Carlos Cano	(Spain) Fernando Bujosa	(Spain) Carlos Cano	(Spain) Seventytwo Artbox Racing Team	
2	1 June	(Spain) Jerez	(Spain) Carlos Cano	(Kyrgyzstan) Yaroslav Karpushin	(Spain) Álvaro Lucas	(Spain) Aspar Junior Team	
2	1 June	(Spain) Jerez	(Spain) Carlos Cano	(Spain) Fernando Bujosa	(Spain) Álex Longarela	(Spain) Igaxteam	
3	6 July	(France) Magny-Cours	(Italy) Matteo Gabarrini	(Spain) Fernando Bujosa	(Indonesia) Kiandra Ramadhipa	(Japan) Honda Asia-Dream Racing Junior Team	
3	6 July	(France) Magny-Cours	(Italy) Matteo Gabarrini	(Spain) Álex Longarela	(Spain) Fernando Bujosa	(Italy) AC Racing Team A.S.D.	
4	27 July	(Spain) Aragón	(Spain) Carlos Cano	(Germany) Fynn Kratochwil	(Spain) Fernando Bujosa	(Italy) AC Racing Team A.S.D.	
5	21 September	(Italy) Misano	(Spain) Carlos Cano	(Italy) Lorenzo Pritelli	(Spain) Carlos Cano	(Spain) Seventytwo Artbox Racing Team	
5	21 September	(Italy) Misano	(Spain) Carlos Cano	(Spain) Carlos Cano	(Spain) Carlos Cano	(Spain) Seventytwo Artbox Racing Team	
6	2 November	(Spain) Catalunya	(Spain) Carlos Cano	(Spain) Alvaro Lucas	(Indonesia) Kiandra Ramadhipa	(Japan) Honda Asia-Dream Racing Junior Team	
7	23 November	(Spain) Valencia	(Spain) Fernando Bujosa	(Spain) Alvaro Lucas	(Spain) Álex Longarela	(Spain) Igaxteam	

== Entry list ==
2025 entry list
Team	Constructor	No.	Rider	Rounds
(Italy) AC Racing Team A.S.D.	Honda	4	(San Marino) Gabriel Tesini	1–2, 5–7
(Italy) AC Racing Team A.S.D.	Honda	14	(Spain) Eduardo Gutiérrez	All
(Italy) AC Racing Team A.S.D.	Honda	55	(United States) Mikey Lou Sanchez	2–7
(Italy) AC Racing Team A.S.D.	Honda	69	(Spain) Fernando Bujosa	All
(Italy) AC Racing Team A.S.D.	Honda	84	(Italy) Vincenzo Di Veroli	7
(Spain) AGR Team	Honda	53	(Netherlands) Kiyano Veijer	1–5
(Spain) Aipar	Honda	11	(Spain) Oliver Cantos	6–7
(Italy) Altogo Racing Team	Honda	88	(Italy) Martin Alberto Galiuto	7
(United States) Andifer American Racing	Honda	55	(United States) Mikey Lou Sanchez	1
(Spain) Angeluss Team	Honda	22	(Spain) Alejandra Fernández	1–3, 5
(Spain) Angeluss Team	Honda	44	(Germany) Smilla Gottlich	5
(Spain) Angeluss Team	Honda	71	(Germany) Smilla Gottlich	7
(Spain) Angeluss Team	Honda	61	(Italy) Elisabetta Monti	5–7
(Spain) Aspar Junior Team	Honda	46	(Spain) Álvaro Lucas	All
(Spain) Aspar Junior Team	Honda	77	(Venezuela) Kerman Tinez	All
(France) BRS - Brechon Racing School	Honda	13	(France) Matthias Rostagni	All
(France) BRS - Brechon Racing School	Honda	15	(France) Gabriel Pio	All
(France) BRT Racing Service	Honda	83	(France) Marc-Antoine Audard	6–7
(France) BRT Racing Service	Honda	96	(France) Emprin Swan	6–7
(Spain) ETG Racing	Honda	3	(Slovenia) Tian Krševan	5
(Spain) ETG Racing	Honda	26	(Ecuador) Alberto Enríquez	6–7
(Spain) ETG Racing	Honda	49	(Spain) Izan Rodríguez	All
(Spain) ETG Racing	Honda	64	(Italy) Carmelo Belluzzo	1–4, 6–7
(Spain) ETG Racing	Honda	80	(Portugal) Pedro Matos	6–7
(Spain) Face Racing	Honda	54	(Spain) José Cea	1–2
(Spain) Face Racing	Honda	59	(Spain) Samuel Castiblanques	3–7
(Spain) Frando Racing VHC Team	Honda	10	(Portugal) Afonso Almeida	All
(Spain) Frando Racing VHC Team	Honda	12	(Spain) Gonzalo Pérez	All
(Spain) Frando Racing VHC Team	Honda	70	(Kyrgyzstan) Yaroslav Karpushin	All
(Spain) Frando Racing VHC Team	Honda	79	(United States) Nathan Gouker	6
(Spain) Frando Racing VHC Team	Honda	94	(Spain) Eneko Osorio	All
(Japan) Honda Asia-Dream Racing Junior Team	Honda	32	(Indonesia) Kiandra Ramadhipa	All
(Japan) Honda Asia-Dream Racing Junior Team	Honda	51	(Philippines) Alfonsi Daquigan	All
(Spain) Igaxteam	Honda	43	(Italy) Sebastian Ferrucci	5
(Spain) Igaxteam	Honda	45	(Spain) Álex Longarela	All
(Spain) Igaxteam	Honda	47	(Spain) David Gómez	1–2, 5–7
(Spain) Igaxteam	Honda	48	(Spain) Andrés Garcia	1, 3–7
(Spain) Igaxteam	Honda	74	(United States) Kensei Matsudaira	2–4, 7
(Spain) Ilusion Racing	Honda	29	(France) Randy Truchot	1–4
(Spain) Ilusion Racing	Honda	41	(Spain) Yvonne Cerpa	1, 6–7
(Spain) Ilusion Racing	Honda	52	(Spain) Víctor Cubeles	7
(Spain) Ilusion Racing	Honda	82	(United Kingdom) Kyle Payne	1–6
(Spain) Ilusion Racing	Honda	89	(Spain) Eric Ruz	All
(Spain) Ilusion Racing	Honda	97	(Romania) Joel Mora	5–6
(France) JEG Racing; JEG Take Off GP	Honda	9	(France) Antoine Nativi	All
(France) JEG Racing; JEG Take Off GP	Honda	17	(France) Carla Mulot	1–4
(France) JEG Racing; JEG Take Off GP	Honda	36	(France) Evan Boxberger	All
(France) JEG Racing; JEG Take Off GP	Honda	72	(France) David Da Costa	1–2, 5–7
(France) JEG Racing; JEG Take Off GP	Honda	78	(France) Henri Mignot	All
(Germany) Kiefer Racing	Honda	5	(Germany) Thias Wenzel	3
(Germany) Kiefer Racing	Honda	6	(Germany) Anina Urlass	3, 6–7
(Germany) Kiefer Racing	Honda	75	(Germany) Robin Siegert	6–7
(Spain) MIR Racing Finetwork Team	Honda	18	(Italy) Mathias Tamburini	All
(Spain) MIR Racing Finetwork Team	Honda	28	(Spain) Iker Rodriguez	4–7
(Spain) MIR Racing Finetwork Team	Honda	31	(Italy) Edoardo Savino	All
(United Kingdom) Mlav Racing	Honda	8	(Bulgaria) Nikola Miroslavov	3–6
(United Kingdom) Mlav Racing	Honda	34	(Japan) Seiryu Ikegami	7
(United Kingdom) Mlav Racing	Honda	42	(Denmark) Julius Frellsen	1–6
(United Kingdom) Mlav Racing	Honda	92	(Malta) Travis Borg	All
(Spain) MRE Talent; MRE Talent CDE	Honda	33	(United States) Leonidas Guimaraes	2, 4–5, 7
(Spain) MRE Talent; MRE Talent CDE	Honda	37	(Netherlands) Jurrien van Crugten	1–5
(Spain) MRE Talent; MRE Talent CDE	Honda	62	(United Kingdom) Ethan Sparks	1–3, 6–7
(Spain) / (Sweden) Nordgen Racing Larresport	Honda	50	(Sweden) Valdermar Mellgren	6
(Spain) QRG Escudería	Honda	26	(Ecuador) Alberto Enríquez	1–3
(Spain) Seventytwo Artbox Racing Team	Honda	1	(Spain) Carlos Cano	All
(Spain) Seventytwo Artbox Racing Team	Honda	20	(Germany) Fynn Kratochwil	1–4, 6–7
(Spain) SF Racing	Honda	52	(Spain) Víctor Cubeles	1–6
(Spain) SF Racing	Honda	80	(Portugal) Pedro Matos	1–4
(Spain) SF Racing	Honda	95	(Italy) Antonio Iorio	1–5
(Spain) SF Racing	Honda	84	(Italy) Vincenzo Di Veroli	6
(Italy) SM Corse–Gea Motorsport	Honda	84	(Italy) Vincenzo Di Veroli	5
(Italy) SM Corse–Gea Motorsport	Honda	91	(Italy) Enrico Dal Bosco	7
(United Kingdom) SMP Racing	Honda	19	(United Kingdom) Scott McPhee	1
(Italy) Team Echovit Pasini Racing	Honda	2	(Italy) Leonardo Martinazzi	All
(Italy) Team Echovit Pasini Racing	Honda	7	(Italy) Cristian Borrelli	All
(Italy) Team Echovit Pasini Racing	Honda	21	(Italy) Gionata Barbagallo	1–3
(Italy) Team Echovit Pasini Racing	Honda	40	(Italy) Leonardo Casadei	7
(Italy) Team Echovit Pasini Racing	Honda	67	(Italy) Lorenzo Pritelli	5–7
(Italy) Team Echovit Pasini Racing	Honda	81	(Italy) Matteo Gabarrini	All
(Spain) Team Estrella Galicia 0,0	Honda	8	(Bulgaria) Nikola Miroslavov	1–2
(Spain) Team Estrella Galicia 0,0	Honda	11	(Spain) Oliver Cantos	1–4
(Spain) Team Estrella Galicia 0,0	Honda	25	(France) Nolann Macary	3, 6
(Spain) Team Estrella Galicia 0,0	Honda	27	(Colombia) Mateo Marulanda	All
(Spain) Team Impala Honda	Honda	23	(Spain) Ignacio Galán	All
(Spain) Team Larresport	Honda	5	(Germany) Thias Wenzel	7
(Spain) Team Larresport	Honda	24	(Colombia) Jhon A Lopez	4
(Spain) Team Larresport	Honda	38	(Spain) Joel Pons	1–2, 4–6
(Spain) Team Larresport	Honda	99	(France) Rémy Sanjuan	All

== Championship' standings ==
Scoring system

Points were awarded to the top fifteen finishers. Rider had to finish the race to earn points.

Position	1st	2nd	3rd	4th	5th	6th	7th	8th	9th	10th	11th	12th	13th	14th	15th
Points	25	20	16	13	11	10	9	8	7	6	5	4	3	2	1

=== Riders' championship ===
Pos.	Rider	EST (Portugal)		JER (Spain)		MAG (France)		ARA (Spain)	MIS (Italy)		CAT (Spain)	VAL (Spain)	Points
1	(Spain) Fernando Bujosa	1	DSQ^{F}	2	Ret^{F}	4^{F}	1	1	3	2	Ret	3^{P}	160
2	(Spain) Carlos Cano	Ret^{P}	1^{P}	6^{P}	2^{P}	Ret	6	2^{P}	1^{P}	1^{PF}	2^{P}	DSQ	155
3	(Spain) Álex Longarela	2^{F}	3	3	1	Ret	2^{F}	5	10	15	4	1	153
4	(Spain) Álvaro Lucas	4	4	1	Ret	2	3	4	7	Ret	3^{F}	2^{F}	145
5	(Indonesia) Kiandra Ramadhipa	3	Ret	7	6	1	4	6	5	6	1	Ret	129
6	(Kyrgyzstan) Yaroslav Karpushin	12	6	21^{F}	3	Ret	12	3	4	7	DSQ	4	85
7	(Malta) Travis Borg	5	Ret	8	Ret	10	7	DSQ	12	8	5	6	67
8	(Spain) Eduardo Gutiérrez	6	12	4	Ret	6	11	12	11	10	16	15	58
9	(San Marino) Gabriel Tesini	DNQ	DNQ	9	4				6	3	8	Ret	54
10	(Germany) Fynn Kratochwil	8	5	DNQ	DNQ	7	20	8^{F}			6	8	54
11	(Italy) Cristian Borrelli	10	Ret	19	15	3	14	26	9	4	11	13	53
12	(Italy) Matteo Gabarrini	17	8	Ret	14	5^{P}	10^{P}	13	8	11	21	DNQ	43
13	(Italy) Lorenzo Pritelli								2^{F}	5	Ret	7	40
14	(France) Antoine Nativi	Ret	18	10	5	15	8	11	Ret	DNS	Ret	9	38
15	(Colombia) Mateo Marulanda	22	7	11	11	9	Ret	10	18	18	10	DNQ	38
16	(Spain) Ignacio Galán	DNS	DNS	5	Ret	8	21	18	13	12	13	10	35
17	(Spain) Eneko Osorio	DNQ	DNQ	12	20	13	22	7	14	16	15	5	30
18	(Spain) Gonzalo Pérez	14	2	Ret	Ret	16	24	14	DNQ	21	Ret	11	29
19	(Spain) Izan Rodríguez	7	10	Ret	8	11	DSQ	16	20	Ret	DNQ	DNQ	28
20	(Venezuela) Kerman Tinez	11	9	14	Ret	Ret	9	21	25	17	DNQ	DNQ	21
21	(United States) Mikey Lou Sanchez	Ret	Ret	DSQ	9	12	Ret	9	Ret	Ret	Ret	14	20
22	(Philippines) Alfonsi Daquigan	20	11	DNQ	DNQ	18	18	DNQ	16	13	7	DNQ	17
23	(United Kingdom) Ethan Sparks	DNQ	DNQ	13	10	Ret	16				9	17	16
24	(France) Matthias Rostagni	Ret	Ret	18	18	14	5	DNS	DNQ	DNQ	DNQ	DNQ	13
25	(Italy) Mathias Tamburini	9	16	16	Ret	20	17	22	26	24	12	18	11
26	(France) David Da Costa	Ret	Ret	15	7				24	Ret	18	DNQ	10
27	(Italy) Eduardo Savino	DNQ	DNQ	DNQ	DNQ	Ret	23	15	Ret	9	Ret	16	8
28	(France) Rémy Sanjuan	Ret	14	DNQ	DNQ	19	13	25	19	Ret	14	22	7
29	(France) Evan Boxberger	15	19	Ret	12	17	15	17	23	20	Ret	23	6
30	(Portugal) Alfonso Almeida	18	Ret	17	13	Ret	19	19	17	14	Ret	19	5
31	(Spain) Oliver Cantos	DNQ	DNQ	Ret	17	DNQ	DNQ	DNQ			17	12	4
32	(Bulgaria) Nikola Miroslavov	19	13	Ret	21	DNQ	DNQ	DNS	Ret	23	DNQ		3
33	(Netherlands) Jurrien van Crugten	13	Ret	DNQ	DNQ	DNQ	DNQ	DNQ	WD	WD			3
34	(Italy) Vincenzo Di Veroli								15	19	DNQ	DNQ	1
35	(Ecuador) Alberto Enríquez	21	15	DNQ	DNQ	Ret	DSQ				DNQ	DNQ	1
36	(Netherlands) Kiyano Veijer	16	20	22	16	DNQ	DNQ	DNQ					0
37	(Italy) Gionata Barbagallo	Ret	17	DNQ	DNQ	22	DNS						0
38	(Spain) Joel Pons	DNQ	DNQ	23	19								0
39	(Italy) Leonardo Martinazzi	DNQ	DNQ	DNQ	DNQ	DNQ	DNQ	DNQ	DNQ	DNQ	19	DNQ	0
40	(Spain) Andres Garcia	DNQ	DNQ			DNQ	DNQ	DNQ	22	23	20	Ret	0
41	(United States) Kensei Matsudaira			20	Ret	DNQ	DNQ	23				DNQ	0
42	(Spain) Victor Cubeles	DNQ	DNQ	DNQ	DNQ	DNQ	DNQ	20	DNQ	DNQ	DNQ	24	0
43	(Portugal) Pedro Matos	DNQ	DNQ	DNQ	DNQ	DNQ	DNQ	DNQ			DNQ	20	0
44	(Italy) Carmelo Belluzzo	DNQ	DNQ	DNQ	DNQ	21	Ret	24			DNQ	DNQ	0
45	(Spain) Iker Rodríguez							DNQ	21	Ret	DNQ	DNQ	0
46	(Japan) Seiryu Ikegami											21	0
47	(Spain) Yvonne Cerpa	DNQ	DNQ								DNQ	25	0
48	(France) Gabriel Pio	DNQ	DNQ	DNQ	DNQ	DNQ	DNQ	27	DNQ	DNQ	DNQ	DNQ	0
49	(Spain) Eric Ruz	DNQ	DNQ	DNQ	DNQ	DNQ	DNQ	28	DNQ	DNQ	DNQ	DNQ	0
	(Denmark) Julius Frellsen	Ret	Ret	DNQ	DNQ	DNQ	DNQ	DNQ	DNQ	DNQ	DNQ		
	(Italy) Martin Alberto Galiuto											DNS	
	(France) Henri Mignot	DNQ	DNQ	DNQ	DNQ	DNQ	DNQ	DNQ	DNQ	DNQ	DNQ	DNQ	
	(United Kingdom) Kyle Payne	DNQ	DNQ	DNQ	DNQ	DNQ	DNQ	DNQ	DNQ	DNQ	DNQ		
	(Italy) Antonio Iorio	DNQ	DNQ	DNQ	DNQ	DNQ	DNQ	DNQ	DNQ	DNQ			
	(Spain) Alejandra Fernández	DNQ	DNQ	DNQ	DNQ	DNQ	DNQ		DNQ	DNQ			
	(Spain) David Gomez	DNQ	DNQ	DNQ	DNQ				DNQ	DNQ	DNQ	DNQ	
	(France) Randy Truchot	DNQ	DNQ	DNQ	DNQ	DNQ	DNQ	DNQ					
	(France) Carla Mulot	DNQ	DNQ	DNQ	DNQ	DNQ	DNQ	DNQ					
	(Spain) Samuel Castiblanques					DNQ	DNQ	DNQ	DNQ	DNQ	DNQ	DNQ	
	(United States) Leonidas Guimaraes			DNQ	DNQ			DNQ	DNQ	DNQ		DNQ	
	(Spain) Jose Cea	DNQ	DNQ	DNQ	DNQ								
	(Germany) Anina Urlass					DNQ	DNQ				DNQ	DNQ	
	(Germany) Thias Wenzel					DNQ	DNQ					DNQ	
	(Italy) Elisabetta Monti								DNQ	DNQ	DNQ		
	(Romania) Joel Mora								DNQ	DNQ	DNQ		
	(Germany) Smilla Gottlich								DNQ	DNQ		DNQ	
	(France) Nolann Macary					DNQ	DNQ				WD		
	(United Kingdom) Scott McPhee	DNQ	DNQ										
	(Italy) Sebastian Ferrucci								DNQ	DNQ			
	(Slovenia) Tian Krševan								DNQ	DNQ			
	(France) Emprin Swan										DNQ	DNQ	
	(France) Marc-Antoine Audard										DNQ	DNQ	
	(Germany) Robin Siegert										DNQ	DNQ	
	(Colombia) Jhon A Lopez							DNQ					
	(United States) Nathan Gouker										DNQ		
	(Sweden) Valdermar Mellgren										DNQ		
	(Italy) Enrico Dal Bosco											DNQ	
	(Italy) Leonardo Casadei											DNQ	
Pos.	Rider	EST (Portugal)		JER (Spain)		MAG (France)		ARA (Spain)	MIS (Italy)		CAT (Spain)	VAL (Spain)	Points

Colour	Result
Gold	Winner
Silver	Second place
Bronze	Third place
Green	Points classification
Blue	Non-points classification
Blue	Non-classified finish (NC)
Purple	Retired, not classified (Ret)
Red	Did not qualify (DNQ)
Red	Did not pre-qualify (DNPQ)
Black	Disqualified (DSQ)
White	Did not start (DNS)
White	Withdrew (WD)
White	Race cancelled (C)
Blank	Did not practice (DNP)
Blank	Did not arrive (DNA)
Blank	Excluded (EX)

P – Pole position
F – Fastest lap
