= Carlos Cano (motorcyclist) =

Spanish motorcycle racer (born 2009)

- Nationality: Spanish
- Born: 14 December 2009 (age 16); Murcia, Spain

Carlos Cano (born 14 December 2009) is a Spanish motorcycle racer who is currently competing in the 2026 FIM Moto3 Junior World Championship.

== Career ==
=== Early career ===
His father an amateur motorcyclist, the younger Cano started riding in 2017. He moved up to the European Talent Cup category in 2024 and won in his debut season. He returned to ETC the next year but failed to defend his title, losing out to fellow Spaniard Fernando Bujosa by five points after he was disqualified in the final race.

Cano moved up to the FIM Moto3 Junior World Championship in 2026. He achieved his first podium in the second round at Estoril and got his first win in the next round at Jerez. Cano got his first pole position in the fourth round of the season at Magny-Cours and converted it to his second win of the year.

In the same year, Cano competed in the 2026 Red Bull MotoGP Rookies Cup, he started his debut round at Jerez on pole position. He achieved his first podium and win in the fourth round at the Dutch TT. At the penultimate round in Misano World Circuit, he came third in the first race, and won the second race.

=== Moto3 World Championship ===
In October 2026, Aspar Team announced that Cano will step up to the Moto3 World Championship for the 2027 season alongside Marco Morelli.

== Career statistics ==
=== European Talent Cup ===
(key) (Races in bold indicate pole position, races in italics indicate fastest lap)

| Year | 1 | 2 | 3 | 4 | 5 | 6 | 7 | 8 | 9 | 10 | 11 | Pos. | Pts. |
|---|---|---|---|---|---|---|---|---|---|---|---|---|---|
| 2024 | MIS; 6 | MIS; 6 | **EST**; 1 | **EST**; 1 | BAR; Ret | ALG; 1 | **JER**; 1 | **JER**; 1 | **ARA**; 3 | **ARA**; 1 | EST; 6 | 1st | 196 |
| 2025 | **EST1**; Ret | **EST2**; 1 | **JER1**; 6 | **JER2**; 2 | MAG1; Ret | MAG2; 6 | **ARA**; 2 | **MIS1**; 1 | **MIS2**; 1 | **CAT**; 2 | VAL; DSQ | 2nd | 155 |

=== FIM Moto3 Junior World Championship ===
==== Races by year ====
(key) (Races in bold indicate pole position; races in italics indicate fastest lap)

| Year | Bike | 1 | 2 | 3 | 4 | 5 | 6 | 7 | 8 | 9 | 10 | 11 | 12 | Pos | Pts |
|---|---|---|---|---|---|---|---|---|---|---|---|---|---|---|---|
| 2026 | CFMoto | CAT1; 8 | CAT2; 4 | EST; 3 | JER1; 1 | JER2; 9 | **MAG**; 1 | **VAL1**; 1 | **VAL2**; 1 | ARA1; 1 | ARA2; 5 | MIS1; 6 | MIS2; 7 | 1st | 199 |

=== Red Bull MotoGP Rookies Cup ===
==== Races by year ====
(key) (Races in bold indicate pole position; races in italics indicate fastest lap)

| Year | Bike | 1 | | 2 | | 3 | | 4 | | 5 | | 6 | | 7 | | Pos | Pts |
| Year | Bike | R1 | R2 | R1 | R2 | R1 | R2 | R1 | R2 | R1 | R2 | R1 | R2 | R1 | R2 | Pos | Pts |
|---|---|---|---|---|---|---|---|---|---|---|---|---|---|---|---|---|---|
| 2026 | KTM | **JER**; 18 | **JER**; 14 | LMS; Ret | LMS; 15 | MUG; 14 | MUG; 5 | ASS; 1 | ASS; 4 | SAC; 8 | SAC; 6 | MIS; 3 | MIS; 1 | RBR; Ret | RBR; DNS | 7th | 113 |
