= Beñat Fernández =

Spanish motorcycle racer (born 2007)

- Nationality: Spanish
- Born: 19 November 2007 (age 19); Andoain, Spain
- Current team: Team#109 Retro Traffic Kove
- Bike number: 7
Motorcycle racing career statistics
Supersport 300 World Championship
Active years	2025
Manufacturers	Kove
Championships	1 (2025)
2025 championship position	1st (231 pts)
Starts / Wins / Podiums / Poles / F. laps / Points; 16 / 3 / 7 / 3 / 5 / 231

Beñat Fernández Etxeberria (born 19 November 2007), nicknamed "Pelontxu", is a Spanish motorcycle racer who competes in the Sportbike World Championship and Red Bull MotoGP Rookies Cup. He will race in the Moto3 World Championship in 2027.

In October 2025, Fernández was crowned winner of the 2025 Supersport 300 World Championship with Team#109 Retro Traffic Kove. He is managed and mentored by Efrén Vázquez, former Grand Prix motorcycle racer.

== Career ==
=== Early career ===
Fernández was born in Andoain, Spain. He started riding motorbikes at the age of four, after his father Imanol, a motorcycle enthusiast, gave him one as a present. He competed in national minibike categories from a young age and claimed several victories.

For 2022, Fernández competed in the European Talent Cup for Austin Racing VHC Team. He clinched 15th place at Valencia, which gave him his first points in the class. He neared the points throughout the rest of the season and finished 31st overall in his debut year.

Fernández remained in the European Talent Cup for 2023 with the same team. He gradually improved his results, with a best personal finish in ninth place at Portimão and Barcelona. His final position in the standings was 16th. In 2024, Fernández faced his last season in the European Talent Cup, where he finished consistently in the top-ten. His best result was a fourth place at Estoril, narrowly missing out on the podium spots.

=== Supersport 300 and Sportbike World Championships ===
In 2025, Fernández made the step up to the Supersport 300 World Championship with Kove. In his debut round at Portimão, he claimed pole position and won Race 2, after finishing fourth in Race 1. He secured his second win at Misano Race 2, after having finished in third and second place in the previous round at Most. He was crowned champion at the final round at Jerez where he finished first in front of championship contenders Thompson and Salvador.

=== Red Bull MotoGP Rookies Cup ===
At the end of 2024, Fernández was selected to participate in the 2025 Red Bull MotoGP Rookies Cup, along with seven other riders. Fernández had a strong 2025 Red Bull MotoGP Rookies Cup debut season, where he clinched two podiums and won the second race of the Le Mans round in wet conditions, with a big gap behind him. He finished sixth overall in the final standings. He also entered two rounds of the 2025 FIM JuniorGP World Championship with Eagle-1 Team. He finished 11th at Magny-Cours and then 11th and tenth at Motorland Aragón.

Fernández began his second season in the Rookies with a win and third place at Jerez, followed up with a second win in the next round at Le Mans. He would win again at Assen to solidify his championship lead. However, following retirements and finishes out of the top-ten places, he had to defend his lead until the final round at the Red Bull Ring, where he was crowned champion in front of Fernando Bujosa and Ryota Ogiwara.

=== Moto3 World Championship ===
On 11 July 2026, the Moto3 team LevelUp – MTA announced Fernández would be stepping up to the World Championship for the 2027 season.

== Career statistics ==
=== European Talent Cup ===
==== Races by year ====
(key) (Races in bold indicate pole position; races in italics indicate fastest lap)

Year	Bike	1	2	3	4	5	6	7	8	9	10	11	Pos	Pts
2022	Honda	EST; DNQ	EST; DNQ	VAL; 19	VAL; 15	BAR; 20	JER; 21	JER; 19	ALG; DNQ	ARA; 16	ARA; Ret	VAL; 21	31st	1
2023	Honda	EST; 10	EST; 12	VAL; 16	VAL; 11	JER; 17	JER; 11	ALG; 9	BAR; 9	ARA; Ret	ARA; 23	VAL; Ret	16th	34
2024	Honda	MIS; 11	MIS; Ret	EST; Ret	EST; 9	BAR; 12	ALG; 9	JER; 8	JER; 10	ARA; 5	ARA; 5	EST; 4	7th	72

=== FIM Moto3 Junior World Championship ===
==== Races by year ====
(key) (Races in bold indicate pole position; races in italics indicate fastest lap)

Year	Bike	1	2	3	4	5	6	7	8	9	10	11	12	Pos	Pts
2025	KTM	EST	JER1	JER2	MAG; 11	ARA1; 11	ARA2; 10	MIS1	MIS2	CAT1	CAT2	VAL1	VAL2	19th	16
2026	Honda	CAT1; 25	CAT2; 16	EST	JER1	JER2	MAG	VAL1	VAL2	ARA1	ARA2	MIS1	MIS2	32nd	0

=== Supersport 300 World Championship ===
==== Races by year ====
(key) (Races in bold indicate pole position; races in italics indicate fastest lap)

Year	Bike	1		2		3		4		5		6		7		8		Pos	Pts
Year	Bike	R1	R2	R1	R2	R1	R2	R1	R2	R1	R2	R1	R2	R1	R2	R1	R2	Pos	Pts
2025	Kove	**POR**; 4	POR; 1	ASS; 5	**ASS**; 5	MOS; 3	MOS; 2	MIS; 4	MIS; 1	MAG; 11	MAG; 5	ARA; 3	ARA; 10	EST; 4	**EST**; 2	JER; 15	JER; 1	1st	231

=== Sportbike World Championship ===
==== Races by year ====
(key) (Races in bold indicate pole position; races in italics indicate fastest lap)

Year	Bike	1		2		3		4		5		6		7		8		Pos	Pts
Year	Bike	R1	R2	R1	R2	R1	R2	R1	R2	R1	R2	R1	R2	R1	R2	R1	R2	Pos	Pts
2026	Kove	POR; DSQ	POR; DSQ	NED; 9	NED; 11	CZE; 10	CZE; 18	ARA	ARA	EMI; Ret	EMI; Ret	FRA; 15	FRA; 17	ITA; 25	ITA; 22	SPA; 15	SPA; 16	21st	20

=== Red Bull MotoGP Rookies Cup ===
==== Races by year ====
(key) (Races in bold indicate pole position; races in italics indicate fastest lap)

Year	Bike	1		2		3		4		5		6		7		Pos	Pts
Year	Bike	R1	R2	R1	R2	R1	R2	R1	R2	R1	R2	R1	R2	R1	R2	Pos	Pts
2025	KTM	JER; 6	JER; 5	LMS; 5	LMS; 1	ARA; Ret	ARA; 10	MUG; 10	MUG; 3	SAC; 7	SAC; 8	RBR; 16	RBR; 6	MIS; Ret	MIS; 8	6th	120
2026	KTM	JER; 1	JER; 3	**LMS**; 1	**LMS**; 8	MUG; 2	MUG; 4	ASS; 3	ASS; 1	SAC; Ret	SAC; Ret	MIS; 12	MIS; 14	RBR; 6	RBR; 5	1st	175
