= Rico Salmela =

Finnish motorcycle racer (born 2008)

- Nationality: Finnish
- Born: 14 February 2008 (age 18); Nokia, Finland
- Current team: Red Bull KTM Tech3
- Bike number: 27
Motorcycle racing career statistics
Moto3 World Championship
Active years	2026–
Manufacturers	KTM
Starts / Wins / Podiums / Poles / F. laps / Points; 19 / 0 / 0 / 0 / 0 / 93

Rico Lucas Alexander Salmela (born 14 February 2008) is a Finnish Grand Prix motorcycle racer who competes in the Moto3 World Championship for Tech3 Racing. He is a race winner of the FIM JuniorGP World Championship and Red Bull MotoGP Rookies Cup.

== Career ==
=== Early career ===
Salmela was born in Nokia, Finland. Influenced by his father, Tero, who was a successful supermoto and motocross racer, he started riding motocross minibikes at the age of two and later switched to road racing at the age of five. He excelled in national and later international classes in the Netherlands and Spain, and was selected by the Estrella Galicia program to compete in the 2021 European Talent Cup season, at the age of 13. He scored top-ten finishes from the opening race of the season and went on to finish 13th overall in the standings.

After his performances in 2021, Salmela was selected to compete in the 2022 Red Bull MotoGP Rookies Cup, as he entered his second European Talent Cup season. His Red Bull MotoGP Rookies Cup season was very competitive, clinching two podiums in total, one of them being his maiden win at MotorLand Aragón. He finished seventh in the final standings. Meanwhile, in the European Talent Cup, Salmela earned his first podium at Estoril, with a third-place finish, followed by another third in the next round at Valencia. He ended the season eighth overall.

Salmela continued in both series for 2023. In the Red Bull MotoGP Rookies Cup he showed consistency by earning four podiums in total, with one second and three third places. He was on pole position at the Austrian and Misano rounds. His final position in the standings was fourth. In the European Talent Cup, he also placed fourth overall, after a season with two podiums and consistent top-ten finishes.

For 2024, Salmela participated in his last Red Bull MotoGP Rookies Cup season, while also stepping up to the FIM JuniorGP World Championship with Intact GP, on a Husqvarna. He finished his Rookies Cup season in fourth place overall, claiming four podiums, one pole position and no victories. At the same time, Salmela earned his maiden win in the JuniorGP in the second round at Estoril. He claimed several top-ten finishes through the remainder of the season but also suffered retirements, and finished 13th overall in the standings.

Salmela returned to the Team Estrella Galicia 0,0 to race in the 2025 FIM JuniorGP World Championship, making the switch to a Honda NSF250R. He finished on the podium in the opening five races of the calendar.

=== Moto3 World Championship ===
==== Red Bull KTM Tech3 (2026) ====
On 22 September 2025, Tech3 announced Salmela would be joining their lineup for the 2026 Moto3 World Championship season, alongside Valentín Perrone.

==== Red Bull KTM Ajo (2027) ====
For 2027, Salmela will move to Red Bull KTM Ajo on a two-year deal, partnering Brian Uriarte.

== Career statistics ==
=== European Talent Cup ===
==== Races by year ====
(key) (Races in bold indicate pole position; races in italics indicate fastest lap)

Year	Bike	1	2	3	4	5	6	7	8	9	10	11	12	Pos	Pts
2021	Honda	EST; 6	EST; 7	VAL; 15	VAL; 14	BAR; 17	ALG; 12	ARA; 10	ARA; C	JER; 6	JER; Ret	VAL; Ret	VAL; Ret	13th	41
2022	Honda	EST; Ret	EST; 3	VAL; 3	VAL; 4	BAR; 12	JER; 5	JER; 12	ALG; 13	ARA; 14	ARA; 16	VAL; 7		8th	78
2023	Honda	EST; 2	EST; 6	VAL; 3	VAL; 7	JER; 5	JER; 7	ALG; 4	BAR; Ret	ARA; 4	ARA; 8	VAL; Ret		4th	109

=== Red Bull MotoGP Rookies Cup ===
==== Races by year ====
(key) (Races in bold indicate pole position; races in italics indicate fastest lap)

Year	Bike	1		2		3		4		5		6		7		Pos	Pts
Year	Bike	R1	R2	R1	R2	R1	R2	R1	R2	R1	R2	R1	R2	R1	R2	Pos	Pts
2022	KTM	ALG; Ret	ALG; 5	JER; 7	JER; 11	MUG; 3	MUG; 7	SAC; 8	SAC; 5	RBR; Ret	RBR; 9	ARA; 1	ARA; Ret	VAL; 6	VAL; 5	7th	122
2023	KTM	ALG; 3	ALG; 5	JER; 5	JER; 5	LMS; 2	LMS; Ret	MUG; 12	MUG; 4	ASS; 20	ASS; 11	**RBR**; 3	**RBR**; 3	**MIS**; Ret	**MIS**; 4	4th	136
2024	KTM	JER; 5	JER; 5	LMS; 2	LMS; 20	MUG; Ret	MUG; 4	ASS; 2	ASS; 3	**RBR**; 5	**RBR**; 7	ARA; 5	ARA; 3	MIS; 4	MIS; 5	4th	162

=== FIM JuniorGP World Championship ===
==== Races by year ====
(key) (Races in bold indicate pole position; races in italics indicate fastest lap)

Year	Bike	1	2	3	4	5	6	7	8	9	10	11	12	Pos	Pts
2024	Husqvarna	MIS1; 16	MIS2; Ret	EST; 1	CAT1; 16	CAT2; Ret	ALG1; Ret	ALG2; 5	JER1; 5	JER2; Ret	ARA; 8	EST1; Ret	EST2; 10	13th	61
2025	Honda	EST; 3	JER1; 2	JER2; 3	MAG; 3	ARA1; 3	ARA2; 4	MIS1; Ret	MIS2; DSQ	CAT1; 3	CAT2; 7	VAL1; 4	VAL2; 25	5th	135

=== Grand Prix motorcycle racing ===
==== By season ====
Season	Class	Motorcycle	Team	Race	Win	Podium	Pole	FLap	Pts	Plcd
2026	Moto3	KTM	Red Bull KTM Tech3	19	0	0	0	0	93*	11th*
Total				**19**	**0**	**0**	**0**	**0**	**93**	

==== By class ====
Class	Seasons	1st GP	1st pod	1st win	Race	Win	Podiums	Pole	FLap	Pts	WChmp
Moto3	2026–present	2026 Thailand			19	0	0	0	0	93	0
Total	2026–present				**19**	**0**	**0**	**0**	**0**	**93**	**0**

==== Races by year ====
(key) (Races in bold indicate pole position; races in italics indicate fastest lap)

Year	Class	Bike	1	2	3	4	5	6	7	8	9	10	11	12	13	14	15	16	17	18	19	20	21	22	Pos	Pts
2026	Moto3	KTM	THA; 19	BRA; 6	USA; 6	SPA; 15	FRA; Ret	CAT; 16	ITA; Ret	HUN; 5	CZE; Ret	NED; 11	GER; 5	GBR; 7	ARA; 22	RSM; 6	AUT; Ret	JPN; 5	INA; 5	AUS; C	MAL; Ret	QAT; 12	POR	VAL	11th*	93*

* Season still in progress.
