= Hakim Danish =

Malaysian motorcycle racer (born 2007)

- Hakim at the 2026 San Marino Grand Prix
- Nationality: Malaysian
- Born: 30 July 2007 (age 19); Kuala Terengganu, Malaysia
- Current team: Aeon Credit – MT Helmets – MSi
- Bike number: 13
Motorcycle racing career statistics
Moto3 World Championship
Active years	2025–
Manufacturers	KTM
2025 championship position	31st (6 pts)
Starts / Wins / Podiums / Poles / F. laps / Points; 22 / 1 / 2 / 0 / 1 / 131

Muhammad Hakim Danish Ramli (born 30 July 2007) is a Malaysian motorcycle racer who is currently competing in the Moto3 World Championship for Aeon Credit - MT Helmets - MSi. He made his Grand Prix debut as a wildcard at the 2025 Malaysian motorcycle Grand Prix, before joining the series full-time in 2026 and taking his maiden Grand Prix victory at the Czech Republic Grand Prix. He is the 2022 Asia Talent Cup champion and the only Malaysian to achieve this feat so far.

== Early career ==
Hakim was born in Kuala Terengganu, Malaysia. He started riding minibikes at the age of eight, inspired by his father, who owned one himself. He has cited fellow Malaysian rider Zulfahmi Khairuddin as an early influence on his racing career. He competed in national pocket bike and MiniGP categories until 2021, when he was selected to participate in the Asia Talent Cup, at the age of 13.

In 2021, Hakim finished his debut season in the Asia Talent Cup in fifth place overall, securing three third-place finishes, despite missing the final round due to a wrist injury. That same year, he also competed in the 2021 European Talent Cup for SIC Racing Team, scoring a point in his final race at Jerez. Additionally, he also participated in the Italian MiniGP Championship as a wildcard entry, where he clinched two race wins.

In 2022, Hakim faced his second Asia Talent Cup season, where he claimed seven podiums and four victories, which crowned him champion of the same category, becoming the first Malaysian to achieve this feat. He also competed in the 2022 European Talent Cup with SIC Racing, making it his first full-time season in the class, where he clinched two podiums, both being second-place finishes, and finished seventh overall. These results granted him a spot in the 2023 Red Bull MotoGP Rookies Cup.

Hakim made his Red Bull MotoGP Rookies Cup debut in 2023, where he secured a podium in the opening round at Portimão, and finished 12th in the final standings. He also competed in the 2023 European Talent Cup season. He finished third in the opening round, but struggled to stay consistent throughout the rest of the season and finished 17th in the standings.

In 2024, Hakim stepped up to FIM JuniorGP World Championship with SIC Racing-MSi. He scored points in every race and finished 15th overall in the standings. Additionally, he had a strong second Red Bull MotoGP Rookies Cup season, where he finished sixth in the standings after four podiums and a maiden victory at Assen.

Facing his third Red Bull MotoGP Rookies Cup season in 2025, Hakim stayed consistent through the first few rounds of the calendar, finishing in second place in the five first races, followed by a win at Motorland Aragón which put him as championship leader until the Austrian round. He lost the championship lead to Brian Uriarte, followed by losing the second place spot to Veda Pratama, and would ultimately finish third in the standings after a weaker second half of the season. Hakim also started off well his second FIM JuniorGP World Championship season with a second place at the season opener in Estoril.

=== Moto3 World Championship ===
==== SIC Racing MSi (2025) ====
On 24 September 2025, SIC Racing announced Hakim would be making his Grand Prix debut at the 2025 Malaysian motorcycle Grand Prix as a wildcard entry. He qualified in 12th place, and set the fastest lap of the race before retiring after five laps due to a technical issue with his bike. During the weekend, MSi Racing announced their signing of Hakim to race alongside Ryusei Yamanaka full-time in 2026, filling the vacancy left by Ángel Piqueras' upcoming promotion to their Moto2 team.

==== Aeon Credit – MT Helmets – MSi (2026) ====
Hakim began his rookie Moto3 season with MSi Racing in 2026, and claimed his first podium of the season with a third-place finish at the 2026 Italian motorcycle Grand Prix in Mugello.

At the 2026 Czech Republic motorcycle Grand Prix at Automotodrom Brno, Hakim took his maiden Moto3 victory following a last-lap battle among six riders, recovering from a twelve-place grid penalty to hit the front on the final tour. Contact between race leaders Maximo Quiles and Brian Uriarte at the penultimate corner opened the door for Hakim to come through for the win, finishing ahead of Uriarte and Quiles. It was the first time a Malaysian rider had stood on top of a Moto3 podium since Khairul Idham Pawi's win at the 2016 German motorcycle Grand Prix.

== Career statistics ==
=== Asia Talent Cup ===
==== Races by year ====
(key) (Races in bold indicate pole position; races in italics indicate fastest lap)

Year	Bike	1		2		3		4		5		6		Pos	Pts
Year	Bike	R1	R2	R1	R2	R1	R2	R1	R2	R1	R2	R1	R2	Pos	Pts
2021	Honda	QAT; 3	QAT; 3	DOH; 7	DOH; 3	INA; Ret	INA; DNS	MAN	MAN					5th	57
2022	Honda	QAT; 5	QAT; 5	INA; 1	INA; 1	JPN; 2	JPN; C	THA; 1	THA; 7	MAL; Ret	MAL; 1	MAN; 3	MAN; 2	1st	187

=== European Talent Cup ===
==== Races by year ====
(key) (Races in bold indicate pole position; races in italics indicate fastest lap)

Year	Bike	1	2	3	4	5	6	7	8	9	10	11	12	Pos	Pts
2021	Honda	EST	EST	VAL	VAL	BAR; 19	ALG; Ret	ARA; 20	ARA; C	JER; DNS	JER; 15	VAL	VAL	34th	1
2022	Honda	EST; 5	EST; 2	VAL; 8	VAL; 12	BAR; 10	JER; 2	JER; 10	ALG; Ret	ARA; 10	ARA; 9	VAL; 16		7th	88
2023	Honda	EST; 3	EST; Ret	VAL; 11	VAL; 13	JER; Ret	JER; 26	ALG; 20	BAR; 17	ARA; 21	ARA; 18	VAL; 10		17th	30

=== Red Bull MotoGP Rookies Cup ===
==== Races by year ====
(key) (Races in bold indicate pole position; races in italics indicate fastest lap)

Year	Bike	1		2		3		4		5		6		7		Pos	Pts
Year	Bike	R1	R2	R1	R2	R1	R2	R1	R2	R1	R2	R1	R2	R1	R2	Pos	Pts
2023	KTM	ALG; 5	ALG; 3	JER; 9	JER; 11	LMS; 9	LMS; Ret	MUG; Ret	MUG; 6	ASS; 5	ASS; Ret	RBR; 20	RBR; Ret	MIS; 15	MIS; 14	12th	70
2024	KTM	JER; 9	JER; 2	LMS; 6	LMS; 3	MUG; 7	MUG; 6	ASS; 11	ASS; 10	RBR; 14	RBR; 14	ARA; 14	ARA; 1	MIS; 3	MIS; 7	6th	139
2025	KTM	**JER**; 2	**JER**; 2	**LMS**; 2	**LMS**; 2	ARA; 2	ARA; 1	MUG; 13	MUG; 2	SCH; 10	SCH; 18	RBR; 8	RBR; 13	MIS; 10	MIS; Ret	3rd	171

=== FIM JuniorGP World Championship ===
==== Races by year ====
(key) (Races in bold indicate pole position; races in italics indicate fastest lap)

Year	Bike	1	2	3	4	5	6	7	8	9	10	11	12	Pos	Pts
2024	KTM	MIS1; 9	MIS2; 15	EST; 15	CAT1; 11	CAT2; 7	ALG1; 9	ALG2; 11	JER1; 8	JER2; Ret	ARA; 13	EST1	EST2	15th	46
2025	KTM	EST; 2	JER1; 9	JER2; 5	MAG; 29	ARA1; 4	ARA2; Ret	MIS1; 15	MIS2; 12	CAT1; 9	CAT2; 6	VAL1; 9	VAL2; 8	8th	89

=== Grand Prix motorcycle racing ===
==== By season ====
Season	Class	Motorcycle	Team	Race	Win	Podium	Pole	FLap	Pts	Plcd
2025	Moto3	KTM	Frinsa – MT Helmets – MSi	3	0	0	0	1	6	31st
2026	Moto3	KTM	Aeon Credit – MT Helmets – MSi	19	1	2	0	0	125*	8th*
Total				**22**	**1**	**2**	**0**	**1**	**131**	

==== By class ====
Class	Seasons	1st GP	1st pod	1st win	Race	Win	Podiums	Pole	FLap	Pts	WChmp
Moto3	2025–present	2025 Malaysia	2026 Italy	2026 Czech Republic	22	1	2	0	1	131	0
Total	2025–present				**22**	**1**	**2**	**0**	**1**	**131**	**0**

==== Races by year ====
(key) (Races in bold indicate pole position; races in italics indicate fastest lap)

Year	Class	Bike	1	2	3	4	5	6	7	8	9	10	11	12	13	14	15	16	17	18	19	20	21	22	Pos	Pts
2025	Moto3	KTM	THA	ARG	AME	QAT	SPA	FRA	GBR	ARA	ITA	NED	GER	CZE	AUT	HUN	CAT	RSM	JPN	INA	AUS	MAL; Ret	POR; 12	VAL; 14	31st	6
2026	Moto3	KTM	THA; 18	BRA; 10	USA; 13	SPA; 13	FRA; 10	CAT; 6	ITA; 3	HUN; Ret	CZE; 1	NED; 7	GER; 12	GBR; Ret	ARA; 12	RSM; 12	AUT; 9	JPN; 12	INA; 14	AUS; C	MAL; 4	QAT; 7	POR	VAL	8th*	125*

* Season still in progress.
