= 2027 Moto3 World Championship =

16th running of the Moto3 World Championship

The 2027 FIM Moto3 World Championship will be the lightweight class of the 79th Fédération Internationale de Motocyclisme (FIM) Road Racing World Championship season.

== Teams and riders ==
Team	Constructor	Motorcycle	No.	Rider
(United Kingdom) Gryd Racing	Honda	NSF250RW	8	(United Kingdom) Eddie O'Shea
(United Kingdom) Gryd Racing	Honda	NSF250RW	66	(Australia) Joel Kelso
(Japan) Honda HRC Asia	Honda	NSF250RW	TBA	TBD
(Japan) Honda HRC Asia	Honda	NSF250RW	TBA	TBD
(Luxembourg) Leopard Racing	Honda	NSF250RW	TBA	(Italy) Leonardo Zanni
(Luxembourg) Leopard Racing	Honda	NSF250RW	TBA	(Spain) David González
(Italy) Rivacold Snipers Team	Honda	NSF250RW	TBA	(France) David Da Costa
(Italy) Rivacold Snipers Team	Honda	NSF250RW	TBA	TBD
(Italy) Sic58 Squadra Corse	Honda	NSF250RW	TBA	TBD
(Italy) Sic58 Squadra Corse	Honda	NSF250RW	TBA	TBD
(Spain) Aeon Credit – MT Helmets – MSi	KTM	RC250GP	13	(Malaysia) Hakim Danish
(Spain) Aeon Credit – MT Helmets – MSi	KTM	RC250GP	73	(Argentina) Valentín Perrone
(Spain) CFMoto Aspar Team	KTM	RC250GP	97	(Argentina) Marco Morelli
(Spain) CFMoto Aspar Team	KTM	RC250GP	TBA	(Spain) Carlos Cano
(France) CIP Green Power	KTM	RC250GP	TBA	TBD
(France) CIP Green Power	KTM	RC250GP	TBA	TBD
(Spain) Code Motorsports	KTM	RC250GP	TBA	(Italy) Giulio Pugliese
(Spain) Code Motorsports	KTM	RC250GP	TBA	TBD
(Italy) LevelUp – MTA	KTM	RC250GP	5	(Austria) Leo Rammerstorfer
(Italy) LevelUp – MTA	KTM	RC250GP	TBA	(Spain) Beñat Fernández
(Germany) Liqui Moly Dynavolt Intact GP	KTM	RC250GP	54	(Spain) Jesús Ríos
(Germany) Liqui Moly Dynavolt Intact GP	KTM	RC250GP	TBA	(Spain) Fernando Bujosa
(Finland) Red Bull KTM Ajo	KTM	RC250GP	27	(Finland) Rico Salmela
(Finland) Red Bull KTM Ajo	KTM	RC250GP	51	(Spain) Brian Uriarte
(France) Red Bull KTM Tech3	KTM	RC250GP	31	(Spain) Adrián Fernández
(France) Red Bull KTM Tech3	KTM	RC250GP	TBA	(United States) Kristian Daniel Jr.

Key
Regular rider
Replacement rider
Wildcard rider

=== Rider changes ===
- Leopard Racing will field an all-rookie lineup with Leonardo Zanni and David González, as Guido Pini steps up to the intermediate class with SpeedRS Team and Adrián Fernández switches to Red Bull KTM Tech3.
- Rookie David Da Costa will join Rivacold Snipers Team, replacing Jesús Ríos, who switches to Liqui Moly Dynavolt Intact GP.
- Valentín Perrone will leave Red Bull KTM Tech3 to join Aeon Credit – MT Helmets – MSi, replacing outgoing Ryusei Yamanaka.
- Rookie Giulio Pugliese will join Code Motorsports.
- LevelUp – MTA will field an all-new lineup with Beñat Fernández, 2026 Red Bull MotoGP Rookies Cup champion, and Leo Rammerstorfer, as both Matteo Bertelle and Joel Esteban left the team.
- Liqui Moly Dynavolt Intact GP will field an all-new lineup with Fernando Bujosa, 2026 Red Bull MotoGP Rookies Cup runner-up, and Jesús Ríos who switches from Rivacold Snipers Team, as David Almansa stepped up to the intermediate class and David Muñoz left the team.
- Rico Salmela will switch from Red Bull KTM Tech3 to join Red Bull KTM Ajo, replacing Álvaro Carpe who steps up to the intermediate class with Blu Cru Pramac Yamaha Moto2.
- Red Bull KTM Tech3 will field an all-new lineup with rookie Kristian Daniel Jr., and Adrián Fernández, who switches from Leopard Racing, as both Rico Salmela and Valentín Perrone left the team.
- Rookie Carlos Cano will join CFMoto Aspar Team, replacing 2026 Moto3 World Champion Máximo Quiles who steps up to the intermediate class with the same team.

== Calendar ==
The following Grands Prix are provisionally scheduled to take place in 2027:

Round	Date	Grand Prix	Circuit	Ref.
1	7 March	Grand Prix of Thailand	Buriram International Circuit, Buriram	
2	14 March	Grand Prix of Qatar	Lusail International Circuit, Lusail	
3	4 April	Grand Prix of Brazil	Autódromo Internacional Ayrton Senna, Goiânia	
4	11 April	Grand Prix of Argentina	Autódromo Oscar y Juan Gálvez, Buenos Aires	
5	25 April	Grand Prix of the United States	Circuit of the Americas, Austin	
6	9 May	Grand Prix of Spain	Circuito de Jerez, Jerez de la Frontera	
7	16 May	Grand Prix of France	Bugatti Circuit, Le Mans	
8	30 May	Grand Prix of Italy	Mugello Circuit, Scarperia e San Piero	
9	13 June	Grand Prix of Catalonia	Circuit de Barcelona-Catalunya, Montmeló	
10	27 June	Grand Prix of the Netherlands	TT Circuit Assen, Assen	
11	11 July	Grand Prix of Germany	Sachsenring, Hohenstein-Ernstthal	
12	18 July	(Czech Republic) Grand Prix of Czechia	Brno Circuit, Brno	
13	15 August	(United Kingdom) Grand Prix of Great Britain	Silverstone Circuit, Silverstone	
14	29 August	Grand Prix of Austria	Red Bull Ring, Spielberg	
15	12 September	Grand Prix of San Marino and the Rimini Riviera	Misano World Circuit, Misano Adriatico	
16	19 September	Grand Prix of Aragon	MotorLand Aragón, Alcañiz	
17	3 October	Grand Prix of Portugal	Algarve International Circuit, Portimão	
18	17 October	Grand Prix of Japan	Motegi Circuit, Motegi	
19	24 October	Grand Prix of Malaysia	Sepang International Circuit, Sepang	
20	31 October	Grand Prix of Indonesia	Mandalika International Street Circuit, Mandalika	
21	14 November	Red Bull Grand Prix of Australia	Adelaide Street Circuit, Adelaide	
22	28 November	(Valencian Community) Grand Prix of Valencia	Circuit Ricardo Tormo, Valencia	

=== Calendar changes ===
- The Hungarian Grand Prix will not be returning to the calendar in 2027.
- The Argentine Grand Prix will return to the calendar after a one-year absence. It will be hosted at Autódromo Oscar y Juan Gálvez having last raced there in 1999, replacing the previous host Autódromo Termas de Río Hondo which has hosted the race since 2014.
- The Australian Grand Prix will move from the Phillip Island Grand Prix Circuit to a modified version of the Adelaide Street Circuit.
