= Eddie O'Shea =

British motorcycle racer (born 2006)

- O'Shea at the 2026 Czech Grand Prix
- Nationality: British
- Born: 25 September 2006 (age 20); Leicester, Leicestershire, England
- Current team: Gryd Racing
- Bike number: 8
Motorcycle racing career statistics
Moto3 World Championship
| Active years | 2024– |
| Manufacturers | Honda |
| 2025 championship position | 32nd (3 pts) |
Starts / Wins / Podiums / Poles / F. laps / Points; 45 / 0 / 0 / 0 / 0 / 69

Edward O'Shea (born 25 September 2006) is a British Grand Prix motorcycle racer who competes for the Gryd Racing in the Moto3 World Championship.

== Career ==
=== Early career (2019–2020) ===
O'Shea made his circuit-racing debut in the British Talent Cup in 2019, and finished third in the 2020 championship with five podiums.

=== Red Bull Rookies Cup and FIM JuniorGP (2021–2024) ===
In 2021, O'Shea graduated to both the Red Bull MotoGP Rookies Cup and the FIM JuniorGP World Championship, where he took his first podium the following season.

=== Moto3 World Championship (2024–present) ===
==== MLav / Gryd Racing (2024–) ====
O'Shea moved up to Moto3 in the middle of the 2024 season, joining MLav Racing on Honda machinery at the Indonesian round only a day after turning 18 as a replacement for Joshua Whatley. O'Shea missed the race after suffering an injury in practice, and finally made his debut the following month in Australia.

It was confirmed in December 2024 that O'Shea would remain with the MLav Racing team for the 2025 Moto3 season. He subsequently scored his first world championship point at the Indonesian Grand Prix in October.

O'Shea will remain with Gryd Racing for the 2027 Moto3 season.

== Career statistics ==
=== British Talent Cup ===
(key) (Races in bold indicate pole position, races in italics indicate fastest lap)

| Year | 1 | 2 | 3 | 4 | 5 | 6 | 7 | 8 | 9 | 10 | Pos | Pts |
|---|---|---|---|---|---|---|---|---|---|---|---|---|
| 2020 | DON; 5 | DON; 5 | SNE; 2 | SNE; 2 | SIL; 3 | SIL; 2 | DON; 2 | DON; 4 | BHGP; 4 | BHGP; Ret | 3rd | 144 |

=== Red Bull MotoGP Rookies Cup ===
(key) (Races in bold indicate pole position, races in italics indicate fastest lap)

| Year | 1 | 2 | 3 | 4 | 5 | 6 | 7 | 8 | 9 | 10 | 11 | 12 | 13 | 14 | Pos | Pts |
|---|---|---|---|---|---|---|---|---|---|---|---|---|---|---|---|---|
| 2021 | POR; 21 | POR; 19 | JER; 23 | JER; 15 | MUG; 22 | MUG; Ret | SAC; Ret | SAC; 13 | RBR; 19 | RBR; 17 | RBR; 19 | RBR; 17 | ARA; 14 | ARA; 13 | 21st | 9 |
| 2022 | POR; Ret | POR; 9 | JER; 11 | JER; 13 | MUG; 13 | MUG; 4 | SAC; Ret | SAC; 9 | RBR; DNS | RBR; DNS | ARA | ARA | VAL | VAL | 16th | 38 |
| 2023 | POR; Ret | POR; Ret | JER | JER | LMS; 15 | LMS; 9 | MUG; 13 | MUG; Ret | ASS; 12 | ASS; Ret | RBR; 17 | RBR; 16 | MIS; Ret | MIS; Ret | 21st | 15 |

=== FIM JuniorGP World Championship ===
(key) (Races in bold indicate pole position; races in italics indicate fastest lap)

| Year | Bike | 1 | 2 | 3 | 4 | 5 | 6 | 7 | 8 | 9 | 10 | 11 | 12 | Pos | Pts |
|---|---|---|---|---|---|---|---|---|---|---|---|---|---|---|---|
| 2021 | Honda | EST | VAL1; Ret | VAL2; Ret | CAT1; 22 | CAT2; 16 | POR; 21 | ARA; Ret | JER1; Ret | JER2; 23 | RSM | VAL3; 21 | VAL4; 21 | NC | 0 |
| 2022 | Honda | EST; 9 | VAL1; Ret | VAL2; 12 | CAT1; 16 | CAT2; Ret | JER1; 15 | JER2; 3 | POR; 8 | RSM | ARA; DNS | RIC1 | RIC2 | 13th | 36 |
| 2023 | Honda | EST; 9 | VAL1; 11 | VAL2; 6 | JER1; 16 | JER2; Ret | ALG1; Ret | ALG2; 5 | BAR1; 12 | BAR2; Ret | ARA; 6 | VAL3; 11 | VAL4; 8 | 10th | 69 |
| 2024 | Honda | MIS; 8 | MIS; 4 | EST1; 8 | CAT; 12 | CAT; Ret | ALG; Ret | ALG; DNS | JER; 6 | JER; 7 | ARA | EST2 | EST2 | 14th | 52 |

=== Grand Prix motorcycle racing ===
==== By season ====
| Season | Class | Motorcycle | Team | Race | Win | Podium | Pole | FLap | Pts | Plcd |
|---|---|---|---|---|---|---|---|---|---|---|
| 2024 | Moto3 | Honda | MLav Racing | 4 | 0 | 0 | 0 | 0 | 0 | 27th |
| 2025 | Moto3 | Honda | Gryd – MLav Racing | 22 | 0 | 0 | 0 | 0 | 3 | 32nd |
| 2026 | Moto3 | Honda | Gryd Racing | 19 | 0 | 0 | 0 | 0 | 66* | 17th* |
| Total | | | | **45** | **0** | **0** | **0** | **0** | **69** | |

==== By class ====
| Class | Seasons | 1st GP | 1st pod | 1st win | Race | Win | Podiums | Pole | FLap | Pts | WChmp |
|---|---|---|---|---|---|---|---|---|---|---|---|
| Moto3 | 2024–present | 2024 Indonesia | | | 45 | 0 | 0 | 0 | 0 | 69 | 0 |
| Total | 2024–present | | | | **45** | **0** | **0** | **0** | **0** | **69** | **0** |

==== Races by year ====
(key) (Races in bold indicate pole position; races in italics indicate fastest lap)

| Year | Class | Bike | 1 | 2 | 3 | 4 | 5 | 6 | 7 | 8 | 9 | 10 | 11 | 12 | 13 | 14 | 15 | 16 | 17 | 18 | 19 | 20 | 21 | 22 | Pos | Pts |
|---|---|---|---|---|---|---|---|---|---|---|---|---|---|---|---|---|---|---|---|---|---|---|---|---|---|---|
| 2024 | Moto3 | Honda | QAT | POR | AME | SPA | FRA | CAT | ITA | NED | GER | GBR | AUT | CAT | RSM | EMI | INA; DNS | JPN | AUS; 19 | THA; Ret | MAL; 16 | SLD; 21 | | | 27th | 0 |
| 2025 | Moto3 | Honda | THA; Ret | ARG; 17 | AME; 17 | QAT; 18 | SPA; Ret | FRA; Ret | GBR; 17 | ARA; 21 | ITA; 18 | NED; Ret | GER; Ret | CZE; 18 | AUT; 21 | HUN; Ret | CAT; 22 | RSM; Ret | JPN; 18 | INA; 15 | AUS; 16 | MAL; 14 | POR; 16 | VAL; 20 | 32nd | 3 |
| 2026 | Moto3 | Honda | THA; 15 | BRA; 15 | USA; 11 | SPA; 18 | FRA; 9 | CAT; 10 | ITA; 6 | HUN; 18 | CZE; Ret | NED; 15 | GER; 10 | GBR; 8 | ARA; 14 | RSM; 16 | AUT; 4 | JPN; Ret | INA; 19 | AUS; C | MAL; 10 | QAT; Ret | POR | VAL | 17th* | 66* |

* Season still in progress.
