= Cormac Buchanan =

New Zealand motorcycle racer (born 2006)

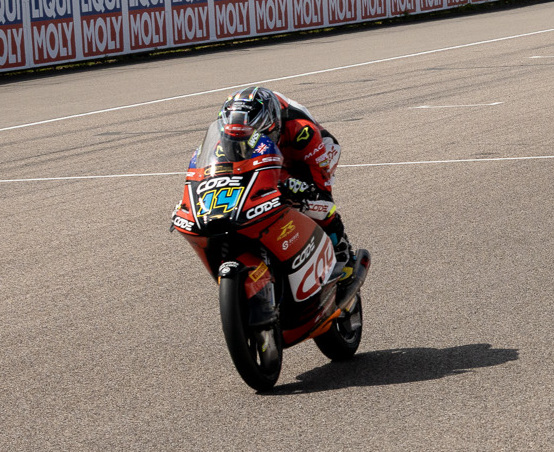
- Buchanan at the 2026 German Grand Prix
- Born: 23 August 2006 (age 20); Invercargill, Southland, New Zealand
- Nationality: New Zealand
- Current team: Code Motorsports
- Bike number: 14
- Website: www.cormacracing.com

Championship titles
- New Zealand Superbike Championship Supersport 150 (2020, 2021); New Zealand Superbike Championship Supersport 300 (2021, 2022); New Zealand Superbike Championship Supersport 600 (2022, 2024)
Statistics
Moto3 World Championship
Active years	2025–
Championships	0
Manufacturer	KTM
Last season	2025
Starts / Wins / Podiums / Poles / F. laps / Points; 34 / 0 / 0 / 0 / 0 / 37

Cormac Buchanan (born 23 August 2006) is a New Zealand motorcycle racer who competes for Code Motorsports in the Moto3 World Championship.

== Career ==
=== Early career ===
Buchanan was born in Invercargill, New Zealand. He started racing in Junior Speedway at Oreti Park speedway in his home town. He quickly established that he was one of the best young talents in Junior Speedway.

In 2018 however, Buchanan decided to switch to Road Racing. He began his road racing career in the Oceania Junior Cup in Australia in 2019 at the age of 12. While he was unlucky to not take any race wins, from not long into the season he was regularly competing in the lead group.

Following the OJC season, Buchanan began racing in New Zealand, given he was now old enough at 13, in the New Zealand Superbike Championship 150Supersport Class.

In 2020, Buchanan won all, but one, races to take his first NZSBK championship.

In 2021, Buchanan defended this title, alongside winning the 300Supersport title, the most competitive class in NZ racing.

In 2022, Buchanan defended his 300Supersport title alongside winning the 600Supersport title and in 2024 he defended his 600Supersport title. This means he now has six NZSBK class titles to his name, one of the best records of any NZ racer, and one of the only riders to take two titles in one season, several times.

Buchanan was selected to compete in the Red Bull MotoGP Rookies Cup for the 2021 season. In his debut season in the series, Buchanan did not score points, achieving a best result of sixteenth place at the Sachsenring. During this 2021 season, Buchanan also competed in the British Talent Cup with the Microlise Cresswell Racing team. He scored three podium finishes that season, on circuits and a bike he had never previously seen. This season was also noted for absences due to Rookies Cup event clashes.

In 2022, in addition to competing in the Red Bull MotoGP Rookies Cup, Buchanan contested the European Talent Cup with the AGR Team, where later in the season he was promoted to the FIM JuniorGP World Championship replacing Italian Mattia Volpi.

Buchanan renewed his contract with the AGR Team for 2023, competing in both the JuniorGP World Championship and the Red Bull MotoGP Rookies Cup. His best result in the Red Bull MotoGP Rookies Cup was fifth place at the second round at Le Mans. In the JuniorGP World Championship, his best result was fourth place in the second race held in Jerez.

Buchanan renewed his contract with the AGR Team for the 2024 season of the JuniorGP World Championship. That season, he achieved his first podium in the category in the second race held in Misano, in addition to getting his first pole position 56 and another third place in Estoril.

=== Moto3 World Championship ===
On 17 November 2024, Boé Motorsports announced the signing of Buchanan for the 2025 season of the Moto3 World Championship, becoming the first New Zealand rider to compete full-time in Moto3 and the first full-time New Zealand rider in the MotoGP paddock since Simon Crafar.

== Career statistics ==
=== Red Bull MotoGP Rookies Cup ===
(key) (Races in bold indicate pole position, races in italics indicate fastest lap)

Year	1	2	3	4	5	6	7	8	9	10	11	12	13	14	Pos	Pts
2021	POR; 22	POR; 20	JER; 22	JER; 18	MUG; 23	MUG; 18	SAC; 17	SAC; 16	RBR; Ret	RBR; 20	RBR; 21	RBR; 20	ARA; 20	ARA; 19	26th	0
2022	POR	POR	JER; 12	JER; 20	MUG; Ret	MUG; 11	SAC; 11	SAC; Ret	RBR; Ret	RBR; 13	ARA; 16	ARA; 12	VAL; 9	VAL; 10	17th	34
2023	POR; 14	POR; Ret	JER; 15	JER; 14	LMS; 8	LMS; 5	MUG; Ret	MUG; Ret	ASS; Ret	ASS; 9	RBR; 6	RBR; Ret	MIS; 7	MIS; 7	13th	59

=== British Talent Cup ===
==== Races by year ====
(key) (Races in bold indicate pole position; races in italics indicate fastest lap)

Year	Bike	1	2	3	4	5	6	7	8	9	10	11	12	13	14	15	16	17	18	Pos	Pts
2021	Honda	OUL; Ret	OUL; 5	KNO; 4	KNO; 3	BRH; 6	BRH; Ret	THR; 3	DON	DON	DON	SIL; 7	SIL; Ret	SNE; Ret	SNE; 7	SIL	SIL	DON; 2	DON; Ret	11th	104

=== European Talent Cup ===
==== Races by year ====
(key) (Races in bold indicate pole position; races in italics indicate fastest lap)

Year	Bike	1	2	3	4	5	6	7	8	9	10	11	Pos	Pts
2022	Honda	EST; 16	EST; 20	VAL; DNQ	VAL; DNQ	CAT; 15	JER; Ret	JER; 20	POR	ARA	ARA	VAL	32nd	1

=== FIM JuniorGP World Championship ===
(key) (Races in bold indicate pole position, races in italics indicate fastest lap)

Year	Moto	1	2	3	4	5	6	7	8	9	10	11	12	Pos	Pts
2022	KTM	EST	VAL	VAL	CAT	CAT	JER	JER	POR; 19	RSM; 21	ARA; 9	VAL; 11	VAL; 17	24th	12
2023	KTM	EST; 13	VAL; 7	VAL; Ret	JER; 5	JER; 4	POR; Ret	POR; 7	CAT; 17	CAT; 11	ARA; 20	VAL; Ret	VAL; 20	14th	50
2024	KTM	RSM; Ret	RSM; 3	**EST**; 3	CAT; 5	CAT; 5	POR; 5	POR; Ret	JER; 9	JER; 10	ARA; 6	EST; 2	EST; 7	6th	116

=== Grand Prix motorcycle racing ===
==== By season ====
Season	Class	Motorcycle	Team	Race	Win	Podium	Pole	FLap	Pts	Plcd
2025	Moto3	KTM	Denssi Racing – Boé	21	0	0	0	0	32	20th
2026	Moto3	KTM	Code Motorsports	13	0	0	0	0	5*	25th*
Total				**34**	**0**	**0**	**0**	**0**	**37**	

==== By class ====
Class	Seasons	1st GP	1st pod	1st win	Race	Win	Podiums	Pole	FLap	Pts	WChmp
Moto3	2025–present	2025 Thailand			34	0	0	0	0	37	0
Total	2025–present				**34**	**0**	**0**	**0**	**0**	**37**	**0**

==== Races by year ====
(key) (Races in bold indicate pole position, races in italics indicate fastest lap)

Year	Class	Bike	1	2	3	4	5	6	7	8	9	10	11	12	13	14	15	16	17	18	19	20	21	22	Pos	Pts
2025	Moto3	KTM	THA; 15	ARG; 14	AME; 10	QAT; Ret	SPA; 19	FRA; 14	GBR; 14	ARA; 10	ITA; 15	NED; Ret	GER; 9	CZE; DNS	AUT; Ret	HUN; Ret	CAT; Ret	RSM; 17	JPN; 16	INA; 16	AUS; 11	MAL; Ret	POR; 20	VAL; 24	20th	32
2026	Moto3	KTM	THA; Ret	BRA; 18	USA; 19	SPA; 19	FRA; Ret	CAT; 23	ITA; 19	HUN; 14	CZE; 18	NED; Ret	GER; 13	GBR; Ret	ARA	RSM	AUT	JPN	INA	AUS	MAL	QAT	POR	VAL	25th*	5*

* Season still in progress.
