= Guido Pini =

Italian motorcycle racer (born 2008)

- Nationality: Italian
- Born: 10 January 2008 (age 18); Borgo San Lorenzo, Italy
- Current team: Leopard Racing
- Bike number: 94
Motorcycle racing career statistics
Moto3 World Championship
Active years	2025–
Manufacturers	KTM (2025); Honda (2026–)
2025 championship position	13th (111 pts)
Starts / Wins / Podiums / Poles / F. laps / Points; 40 / 1 / 2 / 1 / 1 / 197

Guido Pini (born 10 January 2008) is an Italian Grand Prix motorcycle racer who competes in the Moto3 World Championship for Leopard Racing.

Pini won the 2022 European Talent Cup at the age of 14. He is represented by Emilio Alzamora's SeventyTwo Motorsports management agency.

== Career ==
=== Early career ===
Pini joined the European Talent Cup for the 2021 season at the age of 13 and scored points regularly in the second half of the year.

Pini remained in the same category for 2022 and won the title in only his second full season, aged 15.

In 2023, Pini was selected to compete in the Red Bull MotoGP Rookies Cup series, where he achieved two podium finishes. He also participated in his third European Talent Cup season, finishing as runner-up.

Pini signed a contract to participate in the 2024 JuniorGP on board a KTM, and was also given a second year in the Red Bull Rookies Cup. However, during pre-season testing, he suffered a left elbow fracture, just after he had recovered from a right-handed scaphoid and radius fracture, which made him sit out of the first few rounds of both categories. Eventually, Pini recovered and was able to achieve several podiums and wins in the JuniorGP, and ended the season as championship runner-up, despite missing nearly half of the races.

=== Moto3 World Championship ===
==== Liqui Moly Dynavolt Intact GP (2025) ====
On 13 December 2024, Intact GP announced that Pini would complete their 2025 rider line-up, alongside David Muñoz.

During pre-season training, Pini suffered a crash that resulted in fractures to both legs, two months prior to the season opener. He recovered in time and was fit to compete in the opening round. Pini started the season with two consecutive retirements in the Thailand and Argentina rounds, but went on to finish in the points in the following three races, including a seventh place in Jerez.

==== Leopard Racing (2026) ====
Ahead of the San Marino Grand Prix, Leopard Racing announced Pini would be joining their lineup for 2026, making the jump from a RC250GP to a NSF250RW.

=== Moto2 World Championship (2027) ===
==== SpeedRS Team (2027) ====
During the 2026 Aragon Grand Prix, Pini was announced to be joining SpeedRS Team, stepping up to the 2027 Moto2 World Championship alongside Luca Lunetta.

== Career statistics ==
=== European Talent Cup ===
==== Races by year ====
(key) (Races in bold indicate pole position; races in italics indicate fastest lap)

Year	Bike	1	2	3	4	5	6	7	8	9	10	11	12	Pos	Pts
2021	Honda	EST; 23	EST; 21	VAL; 22	VAL; 24	BAR; 20	ALG; Ret	ARA; Ret	ARA; C	JER; 13	JER; 10	VAL; 11	VAL; 10	18th	20
2022	Honda	EST; 3	EST; 4	VAL; 4	VAL; 2	BAR; 5	JER; 7	JER; 9	ALG; 5	ARA; 1	ARA; 2	VAL; 2		1st	165
2023	Honda	EST; 8	EST; Ret	VAL; 2	VAL; 6	JER; 3	JER; 2	ALG; 3	BAR; 1	ARA; 5	ARA; 3	VAL; 1		2nd	167

=== Red Bull MotoGP Rookies Cup ===
==== Races by year ====
(key) (Races in bold indicate pole position; races in italics indicate fastest lap)

Year	Bike	1		2		3		4		5		6		7		Pos	Pts
Year	Bike	R1	R2	R1	R2	R1	R2	R1	R2	R1	R2	R1	R2	R1	R2	Pos	Pts
2023	KTM	ALG; 12	ALG; Ret	JER; 8	JER; Ret	LMS; 5	LMS; 2	MUG; Ret	MUG; 3	ASS; Ret	ASS; Ret	RBR; 18	RBR; 13	MIS; Ret	MIS; 5	11th	73
2024	KTM	JER	JER	LMS	LMS	MUG	MUG	ASS; WD	ASS; WD	RBR; 8	RBR; 4	ARA; 10	ARA; 7	MIS; 11	MIS; 6	13th	51

=== FIM JuniorGP World Championship ===
==== Races by year ====
(key) (Races in bold indicate pole position; races in italics indicate fastest lap)

Year	Bike	1	2	3	4	5	6	7	8	9	10	11	12	Pos	Pts
2024	KTM	MIS	MIS	EST1	BAR	BAR	**ALG**; 2	**ALG**; 1	**JER**; 1	**JER**; 4	ARA; 4	EST2; 1	EST2; 2	2nd	141

=== Grand Prix motorcycle racing ===
==== By season ====
Season	Class	Motorcycle	Team	Race	Win	Podium	Pole	FLap	Pts	Plcd
2025	Moto3	KTM	Liqui Moly Dynavolt Intact GP	21	0	1	1	0	111	13th
2026	Moto3	Honda	Leopard Racing	19	1	1	0	1	86*	12th*
Total				**40**	**1**	**2**	**1**	**1**	**197**	

==== By class ====
Class	Seasons	1st GP	1st pod	1st win	Race	Win	Podiums	Pole	FLap	Pts	WChmp
Moto3	2025–present	2025 Thailand	2025 Indonesia	2026 United States	40	1	2	1	1	197	0
Total	2025–present				**40**	**1**	**2**	**1**	**1**	**197**	**0**

==== Races by year ====
(key) (Races in bold indicate pole position; races in italics indicate fastest lap)

Year	Class	Bike	1	2	3	4	5	6	7	8	9	10	11	12	13	14	15	16	17	18	19	20	21	22	Pos	Pts
2025	Moto3	KTM	THA; Ret	ARG; Ret	AME; 11	QAT; 10	SPA; 7	FRA; 17	GBR; 7	ARA; 19	ITA; Ret	NED; DNS	GER; 7	**CZE**; 10	AUT; 9	HUN; Ret	CAT; 6	RSM; 9	JPN; 7	INA; 3	AUS; 12	MAL; 16	POR; Ret	VAL; 4	13th	111
2026	Moto3	Honda	THA; 20	BRA; 5	USA; 1	SPA; Ret	FRA; 6	CAT; 20	ITA; 15	HUN; Ret	CZE; 16	NED; 18	GER; 15	GBR; 13	ARA; 9	RSM; 19	AUT; 5	JPN; Ret	INA; 8	AUS; C	MAL; 12	QAT; 11	POR	VAL	12th*	86*

* Season still in progress.
