= Valentín Perrone =

Argentine motorcycle racer (born 2009)

- Perrone at Autódromo Oscar y Juan Gálvez in August 2026.
- Nationality: Argentine; Spanish
- Born: 28 December 2007 (age 18); Barcelona, Spain
- Current team: Red Bull KTM Tech3
- Bike number: 73
Motorcycle racing career statistics
Moto3 World Championship
Active years	2025–
Manufacturers	KTM
2025 championship position	10th (134 pts)
Starts / Wins / Podiums / Poles / F. laps / Points; 40 / 0 / 4 / 3 / 2 / 252

Valentín Perrone Cantón (born 28 December 2007) is a motorcycle racer who competes for Red Bull KTM Tech3 in the Moto3 World Championship. Born in Spain, he competes for Argentina at the international level.

== Career ==
=== Early career ===
Perrone was born in Barcelona, Spain to an Argentine father and Spanish mother. Since the start of his racing career, he has represented Argentina in recognition of his father's support through his early development.

After three days riding at the Circuito Guadix, Perrone was chosen as one of the new riders who would join the Red Bull MotoGP Rookies Cup in 2024. In his first race in the championship he finished second behind his compatriot Marco Morelli in what was the first 1–2 for Argentina in the Rookies Cup. His first victory in the competition came in the third round held at Mugello, Perrone won the second race of the weekend against the Spaniards Brian Uriarte and Álvaro Carpe. In the last round in San Marino, he achieved pole position, and in the first race he would finish in second position behind Uriarte. While in the second race he beat Carpe, finishing the championship in third place.

=== Moto3 World Championship ===
On 18 September 2024, it was announced that Perrone would join the Moto3 World Championship, signing with Red Bull KTM Tech3 for the 2025 and 2026 seasons.

== Career statistics ==
=== Career highlights ===
- 2018: 1st, Copa Rieju 125cc

=== European Talent Cup ===
(key) (Races in bold indicate pole position, races in italics indicate fastest lap)

Year	1	2	3	4	5	6	7	8	9	10	11	Pos.	Pts.
2023	EST	EST	VAL	VAL	JER; 19	JER; 14	ALG; 21	BAR; DNS	ARA; 15	ARA; 15	VAL; 2	19th	24
2024	MIS; 4	MIS; 4	EST; 12	EST; 3	BAR; 5	ALG; 4	JER; 3	JER; 2	ARA; Ret	ARA; 7	EST; 1	5th	140

=== Red Bull MotoGP Rookies Cup ===
(key) (Races in bold indicate pole position, races in italics indicate fastest lap)

Year	1	2	3	4	5	6	7	8	9	10	11	12	13	14	Pos.	Pts.
2024	JER; 2	JER; 7	LMS; 4	LMS; 4	MUG; 6	MUG; 1	ASS; 3	ASS; 5	RBR; 4	RBR; 5	ARA; 2	ARA; 24	**RSM**; 2	**RSM**; 1	3rd	206

=== Grand Prix motorcycle racing ===
==== By season ====
Season	Class	Motorcycle	Team	Race	Win	Podium	Pole	FLap	Pts	Plcd
2025	Moto3	KTM	Red Bull KTM Tech3	21	0	2	2	1	134	10th
2026	Moto3	KTM	Red Bull KTM Tech3	19	0	2	1	1	121*	9th*
Total				**40**	**0**	**4**	**3**	**2**	**255**	

==== By class ====
Class	Seasons	1st GP	1st pod	1st win	Race	Win	Podiums	Pole	FLap	Pts	WChmp
Moto3	2025–present	2025 Thailand	2025 Dutch		40	0	4	3	2	255	0
Total	2025–present				**40**	**0**	**4**	**3**	**2**	**255**	**0**

==== Races by year ====
(key) (Races in bold indicate pole position, races in italics indicate fastest lap)

Year	Class	Bike	1	2	3	4	5	6	7	8	9	10	11	12	13	14	15	16	17	18	19	20	21	22	Pos	Pts
2025	Moto3	KTM	THA; Ret	ARG; Ret	AME; Ret	QAT; 15	SPA; 10	FRA; 10	GBR; 5	ARA; 13	ITA; 8	NED; 3	GER; 12	CZE; 8	**AUT**; 7	HUN; 2	CAT; 10	**RSM**; 6	JPN; 4	INA; DNS	AUS; 20	MAL; 9	POR; Ret	VAL; 10	10th	134
2026	Moto3	KTM	THA; 3	BRA; 7	USA; 4	SPA; 7	FRA; 11	**CAT**; 11	ITA; 18	HUN; NC	CZE; 10	NED; 4	GER; Ret	GBR; 3	ARA; 8	RSM; 5	AUT; 12	JPN; 14	INA; 13	AUS; C	MAL; 15	QAT; 16	POR	VAL	9th*	121*

* Season still in progress.
