= Ángel Piqueras =

Spanish motorcycle racer (born 2006)

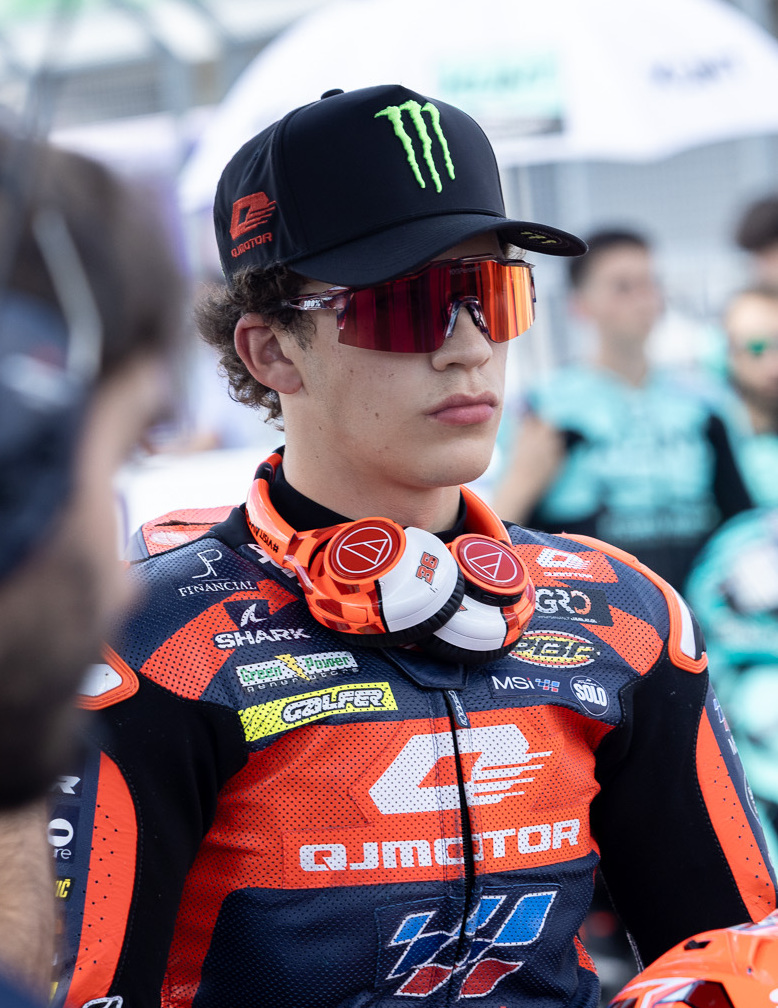
- Piqueras at 2026 German Grand Prix
- Nationality: Spanish
- Born: 30 November 2006 (age 19); Requena, Spain
- Current team: QJMotor – MSi
- Bike number: 36
Motorcycle racing career statistics
Moto2 World Championship
Active years	2026–
Manufacturers	Kalex
Starts / Wins / Podiums / Poles / F. laps / Points; 11 / 0 / 1 / 0 / 0 / 20
Moto3 World Championship
Active years	2024–2025
Manufacturers	KTM
2025 championship position	2nd (281 pts)
Starts / Wins / Podiums / Poles / F. laps / Points; 42 / 5 / 11 / 1 / 4 / 434

Ángel Piqueras García (born 30 November 2006) is a Spanish Grand Prix motorcycle racer for QJMotor – MSi in the 2026 Moto2 World Championship.

== Career ==
=== Early career ===
Piqueras grew up in a biker family, as his Father used do to motocross racing, with Piqueras going to circuits with him. One day, he decided to get on a motorcycle and fell in love with the sport.

In 2013, Piqueras came third in the Cuna de Campeones Minibike, and came runner-up to the title in the following year. He won the 2015 110cc and 140cc Valencian Community Championship and came third in the 110cc category of the Cuna de Campeones.

Piqueras made his Moto5 debut in the 2016 Cuna de Campeones Moto5 category coming fourth in the championship, the next year he came runner-up to the title. In 2018, he embarked on a rookie campaign in the Moto4 category of the ESBK, finishing fourth before clinching the championship in 2019.

Piqueras made his debut in the second round of the 2020 European Talent Cup, where he came second place in his first race at Circuito do Estoril, although he would not get on the podium throughout the rest of the season, he had a consistent campaign, finishing fifth in the championship with 93 points.

Piqueras would return to the European Talent Cup for the 2021 but did not have the success he hoped, retiring from two races and another race being cancelled was a critical blow to his campaign, but he would amass three pole positions and two third places to come seventh in the standings with 86 points.

After two seasons of the European Talent Cup, Piqueras made his debut in the Red Bull MotoGP Rookies Cup in 2022, the young rider made a significant impact right off the bat, garnering two pole positions in his debut round at the Algarve International Circuit, but retired in race one and didn't start the race in race two. He turned his fortunes around at Jerez, where he claimed his first podium in the series, a second place finish. In the latter half of the season starting from Sachsenring, he made a huge improvement to his campaign, securing two victories, four more pole positions and claiming six more podiums, as he finished his campaign fourth overall.

Piqueras also competed in the 2022 FIM JuniorGP World Championship for the first time, where he retired from three races and withdrew from a fourth race but on the upside, he garnered three podiums and finished fifth in the championship with 105 points.

In 2023, Piqueras competed in both the 2023 FIM JuniorGP World Championship and the 2023 Red Bull MotoGP Rookies Cup, the same as last year but instead would storm to both titles, and in the Red Bull MotoGP Rookies Cup, he amassed nine wins in 14 races, and was crowned Champion with two rounds to spare, ending the year with a historic 115-point lead over the second-placed rider in the Red Bull Rookies Cup. While in the JuniorGP World Championship, he claimed four wins and five poles, ending the championship with a whopping 220 points, compared to the runner-up, Luca Lunetta's 138 points.

=== Moto3 World Championship ===
==== Leopard Racing (2024) ====
Following his impressive performances, Piqueras was signed to Leopard Racing for the 2024 Moto3 World Championship, the team of last year's riders champion, Jaume Masià. Piqueras would partner Adrián Fernández for the season.

Piqueras scored his maiden podium in only his third race in the United States, where he also claimed his teams 100th podium. At Assen, he got his first pole position, but would finish the race in eighth.

Following retirement in Great Britain and Aragón, Piqueras took back-to-back podiums at San Marino and Emilia Romagna, which were both run at Misano Circuit. He took his first victory at San Marino as well.

The Asian swing of Piqueras' campaign wasn't as successful, retiring from Japan, Thailand and Malaysia. He bounced back in the final round of the season at Valencia, where he got a final podium. Piqueras finished his first season in Grand Prix motorcycle racing in 8th with 153 points.

==== MT Helmets – MSi (2025) ====
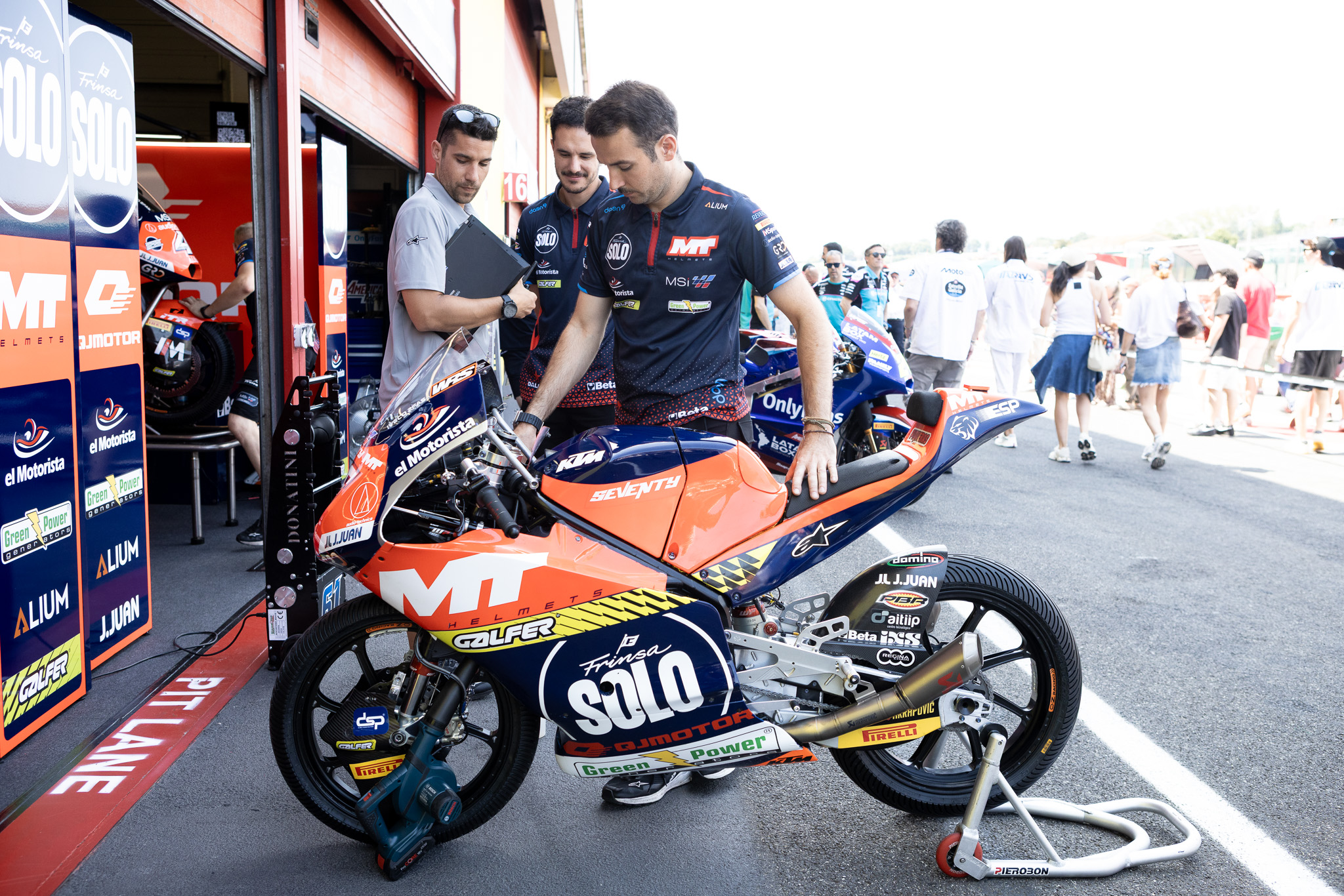
Bike of Piqueras being prepared during the 2025 Italian motorcycle Grand Prix

For the 2025 season, Piqueras switched to Spanish outfit MT Helmets – MSi, partnering Japanese rider Ryusei Yamanaka.

Piqueras got his second Moto3 win in the second race of the season at the 2025 Argentine motorcycle Grand Prix and two rounds later he picked up his third Moto3 win at the 2025 Qatar motorcycle Grand Prix.

== Career statistics ==
=== European Talent Cup ===
==== Races by year ====
(key) (Races in bold indicate pole position; races in italics indicate fastest lap)

Year	Bike	1	2	3	4	5	6	7	8	9	10	11	12	Pos	Pts
2020	Honda	EST; Ret	EST; 2	ALG; 4	JER; 7	JER; 4	JER; 30	ARA; 5	ARA; 10	ARA; 5	VAL; 10	VAL; 12		6th	93
2021	Honda	EST; 4	EST; 12	VAL; 8	VAL; Ret	CAT; 8	**POR**; 13	ARA; 8	ARA; C	JER; 3	JER; 3	**VAL**; 6	**VAL**; Ret	7th	86

=== Red Bull MotoGP Rookies Cup ===
==== Races by year ====
(key) (Races in bold indicate pole position, races in italics indicate fastest lap)

Year	1	2	3	4	5	6	7	8	9	10	11	12	13	14	Pos	Pts
2022	**ALG1**; Ret	**ALG2**; DNS	JER1; 2	JER2; 6	MUG1; 4	MUG2; 8	SAC1; Ret	SAC2; 1	**RBR1**; 1	**RBR2**; 3	ARA1; 5	ARA1; 3	**VAL1**; 2	**VAL2**; 2	4th	184
2023	**ALG1**; 1	**ALG2**; 1	JER1; 1	JER2; 2	LMS1; 1	LMS2; 1	**MUG1**; 4	**MUG2**; 2	**ASS1**; 1	**ASS2**; 1	RBR1; 2	RBR2; 1	MIS2; 2	MIS2; 1	1st	318

=== FIM JuniorGP World Championship ===
==== Races by year ====
(key) (Races in bold indicate pole position) (Races in italics indicate fastest lap)

Year	Bike	1	2	3	4	5	6	7	8	9	10	11	12	Pos	Pts
2022	Honda	EST; Ret	VAL1; 2	VAL2; 5	CAT1; 4	CAT2; 4	JER1; 3	JER2; 8	POR; Ret	RSM; 3	ARA; WD	RIC1; Ret	RIC2; 8	5th	105
2023	Honda	EST; 2	VAL1; 1	VAL2; 1	**JER1**; 1	**JER2**; 3	ALG1; 7	ALG2; 2	**BAR1**; 3	**BAR2**; 6	**ARA**; 1	VAL3; 3	VAL4; 4	1st	220

=== Grand Prix motorcycle racing ===
==== By season ====
Season	Class	Motorcycle	Team	Race	Win	Podium	Pole	FLap	Pts	Plcd
2024	Moto3	Honda	Leopard Racing	20	1	4	1	1	153	8th
2025	Moto3	KTM	MT Helmets – MSi	22	4	7	0	3	281	**2nd**
2026	Moto2	Kalex	QJMotor – MSi	11	0	1	0	0	20*	21st*
Total				**53**	**5**	**12**	**1**	**4**	**454**	

==== By class ====
Class	Seasons	1st GP	1st Pod	1st Win	Race	Win	Podiums	Pole	FLap	Pts	WChmp
Moto3	2024–2025	2024 Qatar	2024 Americas	2024 San Marino	42	5	11	1	4	434	0
Moto2	2026–present	2026 Thailand	2026 Malaysia		11	0	1	0	0	20	0
Total	2024–present				**53**	**5**	**12**	**1**	**4**	**454**	**0**

==== Races by year ====
(key) (Races in bold indicate pole position; races in italics indicate fastest lap)

Year	Class	Bike	1	2	3	4	5	6	7	8	9	10	11	12	13	14	15	16	17	18	19	20	21	22	Pos	Pts
2024	Moto3	Honda	QAT; 12	POR; Ret	AME; 3	SPA; 10	FRA; 10	CAT; 12	ITA; 11	**NED**; 8	GER; 5	GBR; Ret	AUT; 4	ARA; Ret	RSM; 1	EMI; 2	INA; 4	JPN; Ret	AUS; 10	THA; Ret	MAL; Ret	VAL; 3			8th	153
2025	Moto3	KTM	THA; 12	ARG; 1	AME; 4	QAT; 1	SPA; 2	FRA; Ret	GBR; Ret	ARA; 6	ITA; 7	NED; 5	GER; 4	CZE; 4	AUT; 1	HUN; 4	CAT; 1	RSM; 5	JPN; 11	INA; 7	AUS; 17	MAL; 2	POR; 2	VAL; 6	2nd	281
2026	Moto2	Kalex	THA; Ret	BRA; Ret	USA; DNS	SPA	FRA	CAT	ITA	HUN; DNS	CZE; 23	NED; 14	GER; 14	GBR; 17	ARA; Ret	RSM; Ret	AUT; DNS	JPN	INA; 17	AUS; C	MAL; 3	QAT; 20	POR	VAL	21st*	20*

* Season still in progress.
