= Máximo Quiles =

Spanish motorcycle racer (born 2008)

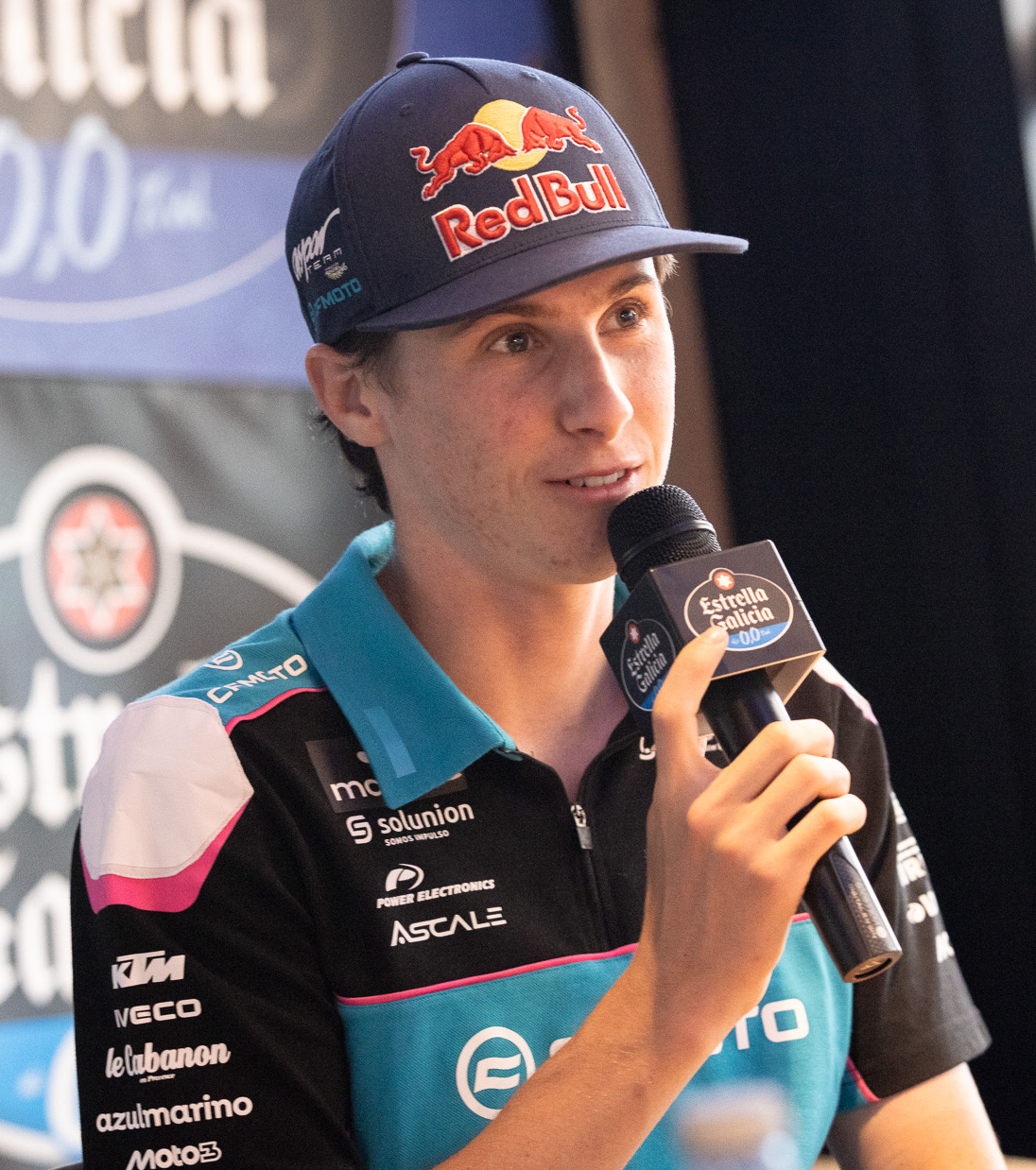
- Quiles at the 2026 German Grand Prix
- Nationality: Spanish
- Born: Máximo Martínez Quiles; 19 March 2008 (age 18); Murcia, Spain
- Current team: CFMoto Aspar Team
- Bike number: 28
Motorcycle racing career statistics
Moto3 World Championship
| Active years | 2025–2026 |
| Manufacturers | KTM |
| Championships | 1 (2026) |
| 2026 championship position | 1st (392 pts) |
Starts / Wins / Podiums / Poles / F. laps / Points; 36 / 14 / 26 / 6 / 3 / 666

Máximo Martínez Quiles (born 19 March 2008) is a Spanish Grand Prix motorcycle road racer who races for the CFMoto Aspar Team in Moto3. He won the 2021 and 2023 European Talent Cup championships at ages 13 and 15, respectively.

Quiles was the 2025 Moto3 World Championship Rookie of the Year. In 2026, he clinched the Moto3 World Championship with five races remaining in the season.

== Career ==
=== Early career ===
Quiles began actively racing at the age of six. He was crowned champion of several national and international championships riding mini GP bikes between 2017 and 2019.

Quiles finished as championship runner-up in the 2020 Moto4 Spanish Superbike Championship at the age of 12, before joining the European Talent Cup.

Quiles joined the European Talent Cup in 2021 and was crowned champion in his rookie season at just 13 years old.

After his impressive 2021 European Talent Cup season, Quiles was selected to compete in the Red Bull MotoGP Rookies Cup for 2022. He claimed three wins and seven podiums throughout the season, securing third place in the standings. He also participated in the 2022 European Talent Cup season, this time finishing fourth overall.

In 2023, Quiles clinched his second European Talent Cup title. Meanwhile, he finished third in the 2023 Red Bull MotoGP Rookies Cup standings, matching his result from the previous season.

Quiles was promoted to the FIM JuniorGP World Championship for the 2024 season. He secured four podiums and one win in the final round at Estoril, finishing in third place in the championship standings.

In his third Red Bull MotoGP Rookies Cup season, Quiles secured six podiums and two wins. Quiles received a one-round ban following a controversial incident in the Mugello Race 2. On the final lap, he exited the last corner leading a pack of over ten riders and swerved across the main straight in an attempt to break the slipstream from the riders behind him. This maneuver caused a collision with Ruché Moodley, who, after a second contact with Álvaro Carpe, dangerously fell from his KTM RC250GP and was narrowly avoided by the chasing riders. Quiles apologized for the incident after the race. The ban caused him to miss the next two Assen rounds, costing him the championship lead. He ultimately finished fifth in the final standings.

=== Moto3 World Championship ===
==== CFMoto Aspar Team (2025–2026) ====
On 15 November 2024, Aspar Team announced Quiles as their Moto3 rider for the 2025 season, alongside Dennis Foggia. He missed the first two rounds of the season due to being under the age limit for riders who have finished in the top-three in the JuniorGP. Quiles made his Grand Prix debut at COTA, where he qualified second, being only beaten by David Muñoz by a margin of one tenth. He finished the race in fifth place.

Ahead of the Qatar round, Quiles suffered an incident in which he hurt his hand, but still traveled to the circuit. However, after undergoing a medical evaluation, he was diagnosed with a thumb fracture and consequently declared unfit to race that weekend. Two weeks later, ahead of the Spanish Grand Prix at Jerez, his team announced he would miss a second race in order to continue his recovery process. Quiles returned for the French round, where he achieved pole position, and finished the race in seventh place. He would finish the following two races, in Silverstone and Aragón, in second place before claiming his maiden win at Mugello.

The next round at the Dutch TT was the weakest weekend for Quiles up until that point, finishing in 15th place after a crash, which was followed by back-to-back second places at the German and Czech Grands Prix, respectively, and later a fourth place finish at the Austrian Grand Prix. Quiles' good season continued at the Hungarian Grand Prix as he took his second win of season, with a race that went all the way down to the wire with fellow rookie Valentin Perrone at Balaton Park Circuit. He continued to impress with his results as the season progressed, and claimed the rookie of the year award at the Malaysian Grand Prix. At the Portuguese Grand Prix, Quiles won the race in dominating fashion after pulling away from the rest of the field in the final laps. At the end of the season, Quiles finished third in the championship and won the Rookie of the Year award.

In 2026, Quiles clinched the Moto3 World Championship title with a victory at the Indonesian Grand Prix at Mandalika. His tenth win of the season secured the championship with five rounds remaining, making him the fourth rider in Grand Prix motorcycle racing history to clinch a world title this early, after Mike Hailwood, Giacomo Agostini, and Marc Márquez. After becoming the Moto3 World Champion, Quiles won the Malaysian Grand Prix to record his 16th podium finish of the season, setting a new record for the most podiums in a single Moto3 season.

=== Moto2 World Championship ===
==== CFMoto Aspar Team (2027–) ====
Quiles will step up to Moto2 for 2027, continuing with CFMoto Aspar Team.

== Personal life ==
At some point in his youth career, Quiles dropped his paternal surname, Martínez, for his maternal one, Quiles. He explained how he didn't want his initials to resemble those of Marc Márquez. His father used to race road bikes in Spain in his youth. He is represented by Vertical Management, a talent management agency founded by Marc and Álex Márquez.

== Career statistics ==
=== European Talent Cup ===
==== Races by year ====
(key) (Races in bold indicate pole position; races in italics indicate fastest lap)

| Year | Bike | 1 | 2 | 3 | 4 | 5 | 6 | 7 | 8 | 9 | 10 | 11 | 12 | Pos | Pts |
|---|---|---|---|---|---|---|---|---|---|---|---|---|---|---|---|
| 2021 | Honda | EST; 5 | EST; 4 | VAL; 4 | VAL; Ret | BAR; 2 | ALG; 4 | ARA; 3 | ARA; C | **JER**; 1 | **JER**; 1 | VAL; 1 | VAL; 6 | 1st | 171 |
| 2022 | Honda | EST; Ret | EST; Ret | VAL; Ret | VAL; 1 | BAR; 3 | **JER**; 3 | **JER**; 4 | ALG; 4 | **ARA**; 2 | **ARA**; 4 | VAL; 4 | | 4th | 129 |
| 2023 | Honda | EST; 4 | EST; 2 | VAL; 1 | **VAL**; 1 | **JER**; 1 | **JER**; 3 | **ALG**; 27 | BAR; Ret | **ARA**; 1 | **ARA**; 1 | VAL; 4 | | 1st | 187 |

=== Red Bull MotoGP Rookies Cup ===
==== Races by year ====
(key) (Races in bold indicate pole position; races in italics indicate fastest lap)

| Year | Bike | 1 | | 2 | | 3 | | 4 | | 5 | | 6 | | 7 | | Pos | Pts |
| Year | Bike | R1 | R2 | R1 | R2 | R1 | R2 | R1 | R2 | R1 | R2 | R1 | R2 | R1 | R2 | Pos | Pts |
|---|---|---|---|---|---|---|---|---|---|---|---|---|---|---|---|---|---|
| 2022 | KTM | ALG; Ret | ALG; 8 | JER; 4 | JER; 1 | MUG; 1 | MUG; Ret | SAC; 12 | SAC; 6 | RBR; 9 | RBR; 2 | ARA; 3 | ARA; 2 | VAL; 3 | VAL; 1 | 3rd | 189 |
| 2023 | KTM | ALG; 21 | ALG; 11 | JER; 3 | **JER**; 1 | LMS; 4 | LMS; 10 | MUG; Ret | MUG; 1 | ASS; Ret | ASS; 2 | RBR; 4 | RBR; 8 | MIS; 3 | MIS; 2 | 3rd | 167 |
| 2024 | KTM | **JER**; 3 | **JER**; 4 | **LMS**; 1 | **LMS**; 2 | MUG; 1 | MUG; 5 | ASS | ASS | RBR; 3 | RBR; 2 | ARA; NC | ARA; 9 | MIS; Ret | MIS; DNS | 5th | 153 |

=== FIM JuniorGP World Championship ===
==== Races by year ====
(key) (Races in bold indicate pole position; races in italics indicate fastest lap)

| Year | Bike | 1 | 2 | 3 | 4 | 5 | 6 | 7 | 8 | 9 | 10 | 11 | 12 | Pos | Pts |
|---|---|---|---|---|---|---|---|---|---|---|---|---|---|---|---|
| 2024 | Honda | MIS; Ret | MIS; 9 | EST1; 6 | BAR; 15 | BAR; 4 | ALG; 4 | ALG; 2 | JER; Ret | JER; 2 | ARA; 2 | EST2; Ret | EST2; 1 | 3rd | 129 |

=== Grand Prix motorcycle racing ===
==== By season ====
| Season | Class | Motorcycle | Team | Race | Win | Podium | Pole | FLap | Pts | Plcd | WCh |
|---|---|---|---|---|---|---|---|---|---|---|---|
| 2025 | Moto3 | KTM | CFMoto Aspar Team | 18 | 3 | 9 | 2 | 0 | 274 | **3rd** | – |
| 2026 | Moto3 | KTM | CFMoto Aspar Team | 18 | 11 | 17 | 4 | 3 | 392* | **1st** | 1 |
| Total | | | | **36** | **14** | **26** | **6** | **3** | **666** | | **1** |

==== By class ====
| Class | Seasons | 1st GP | 1st pod | 1st win | Race | Win | Podiums | Pole | FLap | Pts | WChmp |
|---|---|---|---|---|---|---|---|---|---|---|---|
| Moto3 | 2025–2026 | 2025 Americas | 2025 United Kingdom | 2025 Italy | 36 | 14 | 26 | 6 | 3 | 666 | 1 |
| Total | 2025–present | | | | **36** | **14** | **26** | **6** | **3** | **666** | **1** |

==== Races by year ====
(key) (Races in bold indicate pole position; races in italics indicate fastest lap)

| Year | Class | Bike | 1 | 2 | 3 | 4 | 5 | 6 | 7 | 8 | 9 | 10 | 11 | 12 | 13 | 14 | 15 | 16 | 17 | 18 | 19 | 20 | 21 | 22 | Pos | Pts |
|---|---|---|---|---|---|---|---|---|---|---|---|---|---|---|---|---|---|---|---|---|---|---|---|---|---|---|
| 2025 | Moto3 | KTM | THA | ARG | AME; 5 | QAT | SPA | **FRA**; 7 | GBR; 2 | ARA; 2 | ITA; 1 | NED; 15 | GER; 2 | CZE; 2 | AUT; 4 | **HUN**; 1 | CAT; 12 | RSM; 2 | JPN; 3 | INA; 4 | AUS; 5 | MAL; 6 | POR; 1 | VAL; 5 | 3rd | 274 |
| 2026 | Moto3 | KTM | THA; 2 | BRA; 1 | USA; 2 | **SPA**; 1 | FRA; 1 | CAT; 1 | ITA; 11 | HUN; 1 | CZE; 3 | **NED**; 1 | GER; 2 | GBR; DNS | ARA; 1 | RSM; 1 | AUT; 1 | JPN; 2 | INA; 1 | AUS; C | **MAL**; 1 | **QAT**; 3 | POR | VAL | 1st | 392* |

* Season still in progress.
