= 2024 Red Bull MotoGP Rookies Cup =

Motorcycle racing competition

2024 Red Bull MotoGP Rookies Cup
Previous:	2023	Next:	2025

The 2024 Red Bull MotoGP Rookies Cup was the eighteenth season of the Red Bull MotoGP Rookies Cup and the twelfth year contested by the riders on equal KTM 250cc 4-stroke Moto3 bikes, was held over 14 races in seven meetings on the Grand Prix motorcycle racing calendar, beginning at Circuito de Jerez, Jerez de la Frontera on 27 April and ending on 8 September at the Misano World Circuit Marco Simoncelli, Misano Adriatico. Álvaro Carpe emerged as the champion, securing the title with a second-place finish in the second race at Misano.

== Entry list ==
2024 entry list
No.	Rider	Rounds
4	(United Kingdom) Sullivan Mounsey	All
5	(Austria) Leo Rammerstorfer	All
7	(Germany) Rocco Sessler	All
11	(South Africa) Ruché Moodley	All
13	(Malaysia) Hakim Danish	All
16	(Spain) Joel Pons	All
20	(Thailand) Jakkreephat Phuettisan	All
24	(France) Guillem Planques	All
27	(Finland) Rico Salmela	All
28	(Spain) Máximo Quiles	1-3, 5-7
31	(Italy) Guilio Pugliese	All
44	(Poland) Milan Pawelec	All
45	(South Africa) Kgopotso Mononyane	All
47	(Italy) Edoardo Boggio	All
48	(Switzerland) Lenoxx Phommara	All
50	(Australia) Carter Thompson	All
51	(Spain) Brian Uriarte	All
52	(United Kingdom) Evan Belford	All
54	(Indonesia) Veda Pratama	All
56	(Hungary) Kevin Farkas	All
57	(Italy) Leonardo Zanni	All
70	(United States) Kristian Daniel	All
73	(Argentina) Valentín Perrone	All
83	(Spain) Álvaro Carpe	All
94	(Italy) Guido Pini	4-7
95	(Argentina) Marco Morelli	All
Source: RedBull.com

== Calendar and results ==
2024 Calendar
Round	Date	Circuit	Pole position	Fastest lap	Race winner	Sources
1	April 27	(Spain) Jerez	(Spain) Máximo Quiles	(Argentina) Valentín Perrone	(Argentina) Marco Morelli	
1	April 28	(Spain) Jerez	(Spain) Máximo Quiles	(Spain) Brian Uriarte	(Spain) Álvaro Carpe	
2	May 11	(France) Le Mans	(Spain) Máximo Quiles	(Argentina) Valentín Perrone	(Spain) Máximo Quiles	
2	May 12	(France) Le Mans	(Spain) Máximo Quiles	(Argentina) Marco Morelli	(Spain) Brian Uriarte	
3	June 1	(Italy) Mugello	(Spain) Álvaro Carpe	(Malaysia) Hakim Danish	(Spain) Máximo Quiles	
3	June 2	(Italy) Mugello	(Spain) Álvaro Carpe	(United Kingdom) Sullivan Mounsey	(Argentina) Valentín Perrone	
4	June 29	(Netherlands) Assen	(Spain) Álvaro Carpe	(Argentina) Marco Morelli	(Spain) Brian Uriarte	
4	June 30	(Netherlands) Assen	(Spain) Álvaro Carpe	(Spain) Brian Uriarte	(Argentina) Marco Morelli	
5	August 17	(Austria) Red Bull Ring	(Finland) Rico Salmela	(Spain) Máximo Quiles	(Spain) Álvaro Carpe	
5	August 18	(Austria) Red Bull Ring	(Finland) Rico Salmela	(Italy) Guido Pini	(Spain) Álvaro Carpe	
6	August 31	(Spain) MotorLand Aragón	(Spain) Álvaro Carpe	(Spain) Álvaro Carpe	(Spain) Álvaro Carpe	
6	September 1	(Spain) MotorLand Aragón	(Spain) Álvaro Carpe	(Finland) Rico Salmela	(Malaysia) Hakim Danish	
7	September 7	(San Marino) Misano	(Argentina) Valentín Perrone	(Finland) Rico Salmela	(Spain) Brian Uriarte	
7	September 8	(San Marino) Misano	(Argentina) Valentín Perrone	(Italy) Guido Pini	(Argentina) Valentín Perrone	

== Riders' Championship standings ==
Points were awarded to the top fifteen riders, provided the rider finished the race.

Position	**1st**	**2nd**	**3rd**	**4th**	**5th**	**6th**	**7th**	**8th**	**9th**	**10th**	**11th**	**12th**	**13th**	**14th**	**15th**
Points	25	20	16	13	11	10	9	8	7	6	5	4	3	2	1

Pos.	Rider	JER (Spain)		LMS (France)		MUG (Italy)		ASS (Netherlands)		RBR (Austria)		ARA (Spain)		MIS (San Marino)		Pts
1	(Spain) Álvaro Carpe	4	1	3	5	**3**	**3**	**6**	**2**	1	1	**1**	**16**	6	2	232
2	(Spain) Brian Uriarte	6	3	5	1	2	2	1	4	6	13	3	2	1	3	230
3	(Argentina) Valentín Perrone	2	7	4	4	6	1	3	5	4	5	2	24	**2**	**1**	206
4	(Finland) Rico Salmela	5	5	2	20	Ret	4	2	3	**5**	**7**	5	3	4	5	162
5	(Spain) Máximo Quiles	**3**	**4**	**1**	**2**	1	5			3	2	NC	9	Ret	DNS	153
6	(Malaysia) Hakim Danish	9	2	6	3	7	6	11	10	14	14	14	1	3	7	139
7	(Argentina) Marco Morelli	1	6	Ret	6	Ret	11	14	1	2	12	19	14	10	12	113
8	(Indonesia) Veda Pratama	Ret	11	10	7	5	8	4	7	Ret	3	7	11	8	4	112
9	(South Africa) Ruché Moodley	Ret	8	7	23	4	Ret	5	6	Ret	6	4	8	Ret	9	89
10	(Australia) Carter Thompson	Ret	14	13	11	9	Ret	9	9	10	Ret	6	6	7	8	74
11	(United States) Kristian Daniel	Ret	9	11	10	11	21	10	8	9	9	17	5	9	13	72
12	(Italy) Giulio Pugliese	Ret	10	8	9	8	10	7	12	Ret	8	8	18	13	11	72
13	(Italy) Guido Pini							WD	WD	8	4	10	7	11	6	51
14	(Italy) Leonardo Zanni	Ret	12	9	8	Ret	7	8	11	Ret	15	9	15	Ret	15	51
15	(France) Guillem Planques	7	13	18	14	10	13	12	15	17	19	11	10	15	14	42
16	(Italy) Edoardo Boggio	Ret	17	14	13	16	9	13	13	13	17	DNS	17	5	10	38
17	(Austria) Leo Rammerstorfer	Ret	16	12	15	Ret	14	19	14	7	10	12	13	14	17	33
18	(Hungary) Kevin Farkas	Ret	Ret	15	12	17	18	15	19	11	Ret	15	23	12	19	16
19	(Poland) Milan Pawelec	DNS	DNS	Ret	Ret	14	17	16	17	19	20	DNS	4	22	21	15
20	(United Kingdom) Evan Belford	14	21	Ret	21	12	12	23	18	21	22	DNS	21	20	23	10
21	(South Africa) Kgopotso Mononyani	10	Ret	20	17	Ret	15	20	20	20	Ret	13	22	19	24	10
22	(Spain) Joel Pons	Ret	Ret	19	22	Ret	19	Ret	21	15	11	DNS	12	21	18	10
23	(Thailand) Jakkreephat Phuettisan	11	18	Ret	16	Ret	DNS	17	24	12	18	DNS	20	18	20	9
24	(Germany) Rocco Sessler	8	20	16	18	18	20	21	23	22	21	16	19	23	22	8
25	(United Kingdom) Sullivan Mounsey	12	19	21	19	13	16	18	22	16	16	20	Ret	17	Ret	7
26	(Switzerland) Lenoxx Phommara	13	15	17	Ret	15	Ret	22	16	18	23	18	Ret	16	16	5
Pos.	Rider	JER (Spain)		LMS (France)		MUG (Italy)		ASS (Netherlands)		RBR (Austria)		ARA (Spain)		MIS (San Marino)		Pts

Colour	Result
Gold	Winner
Silver	Second place
Bronze	Third place
Green	Points classification
Blue	Non-points classification
Blue	Non-classified finish (NC)
Purple	Retired, not classified (Ret)
Red	Did not qualify (DNQ)
Red	Did not pre-qualify (DNPQ)
Black	Disqualified (DSQ)
White	Did not start (DNS)
White	Withdrew (WD)
White	Race cancelled (C)
Blank	Did not practice (DNP)
Blank	Did not arrive (DNA)
Blank	Excluded (EX)

**Bold** – Pole position
**^{F}** - Fastest Lap
