= 2022 Red Bull MotoGP Rookies Cup =

Motorcycle racing competition

2022 Red Bull MotoGP Rookies Cup
Previous:	2021	Next:	2023

The 2022 Red Bull MotoGP Rookies Cup was the sixteenth season of the Red Bull MotoGP Rookies Cup and the tenth year contested by the riders on equal KTM 250cc 4-stroke Moto3 bikes, was held over 14 races in seven meetings on the Grand Prix motorcycle racing calendar, beginning at Algarve International Circuit, Portimão on 23 April and ending on 5 November at the Circuit Ricardo Tormo, Valencia. The season was marred by the death of Czech rider Jakub Gurecký, who was expected to compete in 2022, but died in a private training accident riding his own bike in February.

== Calendar and results ==
2022 provisional calendar
Round	Date	Circuit	Pole position	Fastest lap	Race winner	Sources
1	April 23	(Portugal) Algarve	(Spain) Ángel Piqueras	(Spain) José Antonio Rueda	(Spain) José Antonio Rueda	
1	April 24	(Portugal) Algarve	(Spain) Ángel Piqueras	(Netherlands) Collin Veijer	(Netherlands) Collin Veijer	
2	April 30	(Spain) Jerez	(Spain) José Antonio Rueda	(Italy) Filippo Farioli	(Spain) José Antonio Rueda	
2	May 1	(Spain) Jerez	(Spain) José Antonio Rueda	(Republic of Ireland) Casey O'Gorman	(Spain) Máximo Quiles	
3	May 28	(Italy) Mugello	(Italy) Filippo Farioli	(Finland) Rico Salmela	(Spain) Máximo Quiles	
3	May 29	(Italy) Mugello	(Italy) Filippo Farioli	(Belgium) Lorenz Luciano	(Netherlands) Collin Veijer	
4	June 18	(Germany) Sachsenring	(Spain) José Antonio Rueda	(Spain) José Antonio Rueda	(Spain) José Antonio Rueda	
4	June 19	(Germany) Sachsenring	(Spain) José Antonio Rueda	(Spain) José Antonio Rueda	(Spain) Ángel Piqueras	
5	August 20	(Austria) Red Bull Ring	(Spain) Ángel Piqueras	(Spain) Máximo Quiles	(Spain) Ángel Piqueras	
5	August 21	(Austria) Red Bull Ring	(Spain) Ángel Piqueras	(Spain) Ángel Piqueras	(Thailand) Tatchakorn Buasri	
6	September 17	Aragon	(Spain) José Antonio Rueda	(Spain) Máximo Quiles	(Finland) Rico Salmela	
6	September 18	Aragon	(Spain) José Antonio Rueda	(Spain) Ángel Piqueras	(Netherlands) Collin Veijer	
7	November 4	(Valencian Community) Valencia	(Spain) Ángel Piqueras	(Spain) Ángel Piqueras	(Italy) Luca Lunetta	
7	November 5	(Valencian Community) Valencia	(Spain) Ángel Piqueras	(Spain) Máximo Quiles	(Spain) Máximo Quiles	

== Entry list ==
2022 entry list
No.	Rider	Rounds
2	(France) Amaury Mizera	1–5
5	(Thailand) Tatchakorn Buasri	1–3, 5–7
8	(United Kingdom) Eddie O'Shea	1–5
9	(Germany) Freddie Heinrich	1–2, 4–7
10	(Mexico) Guillermo Moreno	All
11	(South Africa) Ruché Moodley	All
12	(Australia) Jacob Roulstone	All
14	(New Zealand) Cormac Buchanan	2–7
18	(Spain) Ángel Piqueras	All
21	(Italy) Demis Mihaila	All
27	(Finland) Rico Salmela	All
28	(Spain) Máximo Quiles	All
29	(Australia) Harrison Voight	1–2, 4–7
42	(Hungary) Soma Görbe	All
48	(France) Gabin Planques	All
55	(Italy) Alex Venturini	All
57	(Malaysia) Danial Shahril	All
58	(Italy) Luca Lunetta	All
67	(Republic of Ireland) Casey O'Gorman	All
69	(Spain) Marcos Ruda	All
77	(Italy) Filippo Farioli	1–6
78	(Austria) Jakob Rosenthaler	All
81	(Belgium) Lorenz Luciano	All
93	(Indonesia) Fadillah Arbi Aditama	All
95	(Netherlands) Collin Veijer	All
99	(Spain) José Antonio Rueda	All
Source: RedBull.com

== Riders' Championship standings ==
Points were awarded to the top fifteen riders, provided the rider finished the race.

Position	**1st**	**2nd**	**3rd**	**4th**	**5th**	**6th**	**7th**	**8th**	**9th**	**10th**	**11th**	**12th**	**13th**	**14th**	**15th**
Points	25	20	16	13	11	10	9	8	7	6	5	4	3	2	1

Pos.	Rider	ALG (Portugal)		JER (Spain)		MUG (Italy)		SAC (Germany)		RBR (Austria)		ARA (Aragon)		VAL (Valencian Community)		Pts
1	(Spain) José Antonio Rueda	1**^{F}**	2	1**^{P}**	3**^{P}**	11	6	1**^{PF}**	4**^{PF}**	2	4	2**^{P}**	6**^{P}**	4	7	224
2	(Netherlands) Collin Veijer	3	1	3	4	15	1	4	2	4	5	4	1	7	6	210
3	(Spain) Máximo Quiles	Ret	8	4	1	1	Ret	12	6	9**^{F}**	2	3**^{F}**	2	3	1**^{F}**	189
4	(Spain) Ángel Piqueras	Ret**^{P}**	DNS**^{P}**	2	6	4	8	Ret	1	1**^{P}**	3**^{PF}**	5	3**^{F}**	2**^{PF}**	2**^{P}**	184
5	(Italy) Luca Lunetta	Ret	10	8	2	8	5	3	8	5	8	Ret	4	1	3	150
6	(Thailand) Tatchakorn Buasri	5	6	Ret	8	2	3			3	1	6	8	Ret	14	126
7	(Finland) Rico Salmela	Ret	5	7	11	3**^{F}**	7	8	5	Ret	9	1	Ret	6	5	122
8	(Republic of Ireland) Casey O'Gorman	2	3	5	5**^{F}**	Ret	22	6	10	Ret	10	7	7	5	Ret	109
9	(Italy) Filippo Farioli	Ret	DNS	6**^{F}**	7	9**^{P}**	2**^{P}**	7	3	14	7	Ret	5			93
10	(Australia) Harrison Voight	4	4	Ret	10			2	7	16	12	9	11	10	8	91
11	(Spain) Marcos Ruda	12	15	14	9	10	9	14	14	8	6	8	9	8	4	85
12	(Belgium) Lorenz Luciano	10	14	17	12	7	12**^{F}**	5	11	17	16	12	15	14	12	52
13	(Malaysia) Danial Shahril	9	12	9	15	Ret	13	10	13	6	15	Ret	13	15	13	49
14	(Indonesia) Fadillah Arbi Aditama	11	18	Ret	19	5	10	Ret	22	7	Ret	17	19	11	9	43
15	(Austria) Jakob Rosenthaler	8	11	Ret	17	6	14	16	17	10	Ret	14	16	12	11	42
16	(United Kingdom) Eddie O'Shea	Ret	9	11	13	13	4	Ret	9	DNS	DNS					38
17	(New Zealand) Cormac Buchanan			12	20	Ret	11	11	Ret	Ret	13	16	12	9	10	34
18	(France) Gabin Planques	6	7	10	18	Ret	17	13	Ret	12	Ret	Ret	Ret	DNS	DNS	32
19	(South Africa) Ruché Moodley	14	13	13	14	Ret	18	21	12	Ret	11	10	10	DNS	DNS	31
20	(Italy) Demis Mihaila	15	20	15	16	Ret	15	9	15	11	14	11	18	16	16	23
21	(Australia) Jacob Roulstone	7	Ret	20	24	16	20	19	20	15	17	13	17	13	15	17
22	(Hungary) Soma Görbe	Ret	16	16	Ret	Ret	16	15	16	13	DNS	Ret	14	17	17	6
23	(Italy) Alex Venturini	Ret	19	18	21	12	19	17	21	Ret	18	15	20	18	Ret	5
24	(Germany) Freddie Heinrich	13	17	Ret	DNS			20	19	18	19	18	Ret	Ret	18	3
25	(France) Amaury Mizera	Ret	Ret	21	22	14	21	18	18	19	DNS					2
26	(Mexico) Guillermo Moreno	16	21	19	23	17	Ret	22	Ret	20	20	19	21	Ret	19	0
Pos.	Rider	ALG (Portugal)		JER (Spain)		MUG (Italy)		SAC (Germany)		RBR (Austria)		ARA (Aragon)		VAL (Valencian Community)		Pts

Colour	Result
Gold	Winner
Silver	Second place
Bronze	Third place
Green	Points classification
Blue	Non-points classification
Blue	Non-classified finish (NC)
Purple	Retired, not classified (Ret)
Red	Did not qualify (DNQ)
Red	Did not pre-qualify (DNPQ)
Black	Disqualified (DSQ)
White	Did not start (DNS)
White	Withdrew (WD)
White	Race cancelled (C)
Blank	Did not practice (DNP)
Blank	Did not arrive (DNA)
Blank	Excluded (EX)

**Bold** – Pole position
