= 2023 Red Bull MotoGP Rookies Cup =

Motorcycle racing competition

2023 Red Bull MotoGP Rookies Cup
Previous:	2022	Next:	2024

The 2023 Red Bull MotoGP Rookies Cup was the seventeenth season of the Red Bull MotoGP Rookies Cup and the eleventh year contested by the riders on equal KTM 250cc 4-stroke Moto3 bikes, was held over 14 races in seven meetings on the Grand Prix motorcycle racing calendar, beginning at Algarve International Circuit, Portimão on 25 March and ending on 10 September at the Misano World Circuit Marco Simoncelli, Misano Adriatico.

== Calendar and results ==
2023 Provisional Calendar
Round	Date	Circuit	Pole position	Fastest lap	Race winner	Sources
1	March 25	(Portugal) Algarve	(Spain) Ángel Piqueras	(Italy) Guido Pini	(Spain) Ángel Piqueras	
1	March 26	(Portugal) Algarve	(Spain) Ángel Piqueras	(Italy) Guido Pini	(Spain) Ángel Piqueras	
2	April 25	(Spain) Jerez	(Spain) Máximo Quiles	(Spain) Máximo Quiles	(Spain) Ángel Piqueras	
2	April 26	(Spain) Jerez	(Spain) Máximo Quiles	(Spain) Álvaro Carpe	(Spain) Máximo Quiles	
3	May 13	(France) Le Mans	(Argentina) Marco Morelli	(Spain) Máximo Quiles	(Spain) Ángel Piqueras	
3	May 14	(France) Le Mans	(Argentina) Marco Morelli	(Republic of Ireland) Casey O'Gorman	(Spain) Ángel Piqueras	
4	June 10	(Italy) Mugello	(Spain) Ángel Piqueras	(Spain) Alberto Ferrandez	(Spain) Alberto Ferrandez	
4	June 11	(Italy) Mugello	(Spain) Ángel Piqueras	(Indonesia) Fadillah Aditama	(Spain) Máximo Quiles	
5	June 24	(Netherlands) Assen	(Spain) Ángel Piqueras	(Indonesia) Fadillah Aditama	(Spain) Ángel Piqueras	
5	June 25	(Netherlands) Assen	(Spain) Ángel Piqueras	(Spain) Álvaro Carpe	(Spain) Ángel Piqueras	
6	August 19	(Austria) Red Bull Ring	(Finland) Rico Salmela	(Spain) Máximo Quiles	(Spain) Álvaro Carpe	
6	August 20	(Austria) Red Bull Ring	(Finland) Rico Salmela	(Spain) Máximo Quiles	(Spain) Ángel Piqueras	
7	September 9	(San Marino) Misano	(Finland) Rico Salmela	(Spain) Máximo Quiles	(Spain) Álvaro Carpe	
7	September 10	(San Marino) Misano	(Finland) Rico Salmela	(Argentina) Marco Morelli	(Spain) Ángel Piqueras	

== Entry list ==
2023 entry list
No.	Rider	Rounds
2	(France) Amaury Mizera	All
5	(Austria) Leo Rammerstorfer	All
8	(United Kingdom) Eddie O'Shea	1, 3–7
11	(South Africa) Ruché Moodley	1–3, 5–7
12	(Australia) Jacob Roulstone	All
13	(Malaysia) Hakim Danish	All
14	(New Zealand) Cormac Buchanan	All
18	(Spain) Ángel Piqueras	All
23	(United Kingdom) Rhys Stephenson	All
25	(United States) Alexander Enriquez	All
27	(Finland) Rico Salmela	All
28	(Spain) Máximo Quiles	All
47	(Italy) Edoardo Boggio	2–3, 5–7
50	(Australia) Carter Thompson	1–3, 5–7
54	(Spain) Alberto Ferrández	All
56	(Hungary) Kevin Farkas	All
57	(Malaysia) Danial Shahril	1, 4–7
67	(Republic of Ireland) Casey O'Gorman	1–6
69	(Spain) Marcos Ruda	All
78	(Austria) Jakob Rosenthaler	All
81	(Belgium) Lorenz Luciano	1–3, 6–7
83	(Spain) Álvaro Carpe	All
88	(Japan) Shinya Ezawa	All
93	(Indonesia) Fadillah Aditama	All
94	(Italy) Guido Pini	All
95	(Argentina) Marco Morelli	All
Source: RedBull.com

== Riders' Championship standings ==
Points were awarded to the top fifteen riders, provided the rider finished the race.

Position	**1st**	**2nd**	**3rd**	**4th**	**5th**	**6th**	**7th**	**8th**	**9th**	**10th**	**11th**	**12th**	**13th**	**14th**	**15th**
Points	25	20	16	13	11	10	9	8	7	6	5	4	3	2	1

Pos.	Rider	ALG (Portugal)		JER (Spain)		LMS (France)		MUG (Italy)		ASS (Netherlands)		RBR (Austria)		MIS (San Marino)		Pts
1	(Spain) Ángel Piqueras	**1**	**1**	1	2	1	1	**4**	**2**	**1**	**1**	2	1	2	1	318
2	(Spain) Álvaro Carpe	2	6	4	3**^{F}**	6	Ret	6	8	2	6**^{F}**	1	2	1	3	203
3	(Spain) Máximo Quiles	21	11	**3^{F}**	**1**	4**^{F}**	10	Ret	1	Ret	2	4**^{F}**	8**^{F}**	3**^{F}**	2	167
4	(Finland) Rico Salmela	3	5	5	5	2	Ret	12	4	20	11	**3**	**3**	**Ret**	**4**	136
5	(Australia) Jacob Roulstone	13	9	2	6	11	6	7	9	4	3	Ret	7	6	10	125
6	(Spain) Alberto Ferrández	6	Ret	7	9	7	3	1**^{F}**	5	11	5	13	9	8	Ret	121
7	(Spain) Marcos Ruda	7	2	14	12	Ret	15	14	7	8	7	5	4	4	8	109
8	(Republic of Ireland) Casey O'Gorman	4	4	10	7	Ret	Ret**^{F}**	2	Ret	3	4	9	Ret			97
9	(South Africa) Ruché Moodley	8	Ret	6	8	3	Ret			6	Ret	8	5	5	6	92
10	(Argentina) Marco Morelli	11	7	11	4	**13**	**4**	3	12	16	8	10	10	Ret	13**^{F}**	91
11	(Italy) Guido Pini	12**^{F}**	Ret**^{F}**	8	Ret	5	2	Ret	3	Ret	Ret	18	13	Ret	5	73
12	(Malaysia) Hakim Danish	5	3	9	11	9	Ret	Ret	6	5	Ret	20	Ret	15	14	70
13	(New Zealand) Cormac Buchanan	14	Ret	15	14	8	5	Ret	Ret	Ret	9	6	Ret	7	7	59
14	(Belgium) Lorenz Luciano	10	8	16	10	12	8			DNS	DNS	11	6	9	11	59
15	(Indonesia) Fadillah Aditama	15	12	13	18	14	7	5	11**^{F}**	13**^{F}**	10	16	Ret	11	9	56
16	(Malaysia) Danial Shahril	9	10					8	14	9	16	7	15	17	18	40
17	(Hungary) Kevin Farkas	Ret	14	18	19	17	Ret	11	16	7	12	12	12	13	19	31
18	(Italy) Edoardo Boggio			Ret	13	Ret	11	DNS	DNS	14	Ret	15	11	10	12	26
19	(Australia) Carter Thompson	20	15	17	15	10	Ret	DNS	DNS	10	14	19	14	12	15	23
20	(Austria) Jakob Rosenthaler	17	17	12	17	16	12	Ret	10	15	13	14	20	14	16	22
21	(United Kingdom) Eddie O'Shea	Ret	Ret			15	9	13	Ret	12	Ret	17	16	Ret	Ret	15
22	(Japan) Shinya Ezawa	18	19	19	16	19	13	9	13	18	15	22	18	18	23	14
23	(United States) Alexander Enriquez	19	Ret	23	21	Ret	Ret	10	19	21	20	Ret	20	20	20	6
24	(France) Amaury Mizera	16	13	22	Ret	18	Ret	Ret	15	Ret	19	23	17	16	17	4
25	(Austria) Leo Rammerstorfer	22	18	21	20	20	14	Ret	17	17	17	21	Ret	Ret	21	2
26	(United Kingdom) Rhys Stephenson	Ret	16	20	Ret	Ret	Ret	Ret	18	19	18	24	19	19	22	0
Pos.	Rider	ALG (Portugal)		JER (Spain)		LMS (France)		MUG (Italy)		ASS (Netherlands)		RBR (Austria)		MIS (San Marino)		Pts

Colour	Result
Gold	Winner
Silver	Second place
Bronze	Third place
Green	Points classification
Blue	Non-points classification
Blue	Non-classified finish (NC)
Purple	Retired, not classified (Ret)
Red	Did not qualify (DNQ)
Red	Did not pre-qualify (DNPQ)
Black	Disqualified (DSQ)
White	Did not start (DNS)
White	Withdrew (WD)
White	Race cancelled (C)
Blank	Did not practice (DNP)
Blank	Did not arrive (DNA)
Blank	Excluded (EX)

**Bold** – Pole position
