= Brian Uriarte =

Spanish motorcycle racer (born 2008)

- Uriarte at the 2026 San Marino Grand Prix
- Nationality: Spanish
- Born: 11 August 2008 (age 18); Santander, Spain
- Current team: Red Bull KTM Ajo
- Bike number: 51
Motorcycle racing career statistics
Moto3 World Championship
Active years	2025–
Manufacturers	KTM
2025 championship position	28th (11 pts)
Starts / Wins / Podiums / Poles / F. laps / Points; 23 / 2 / 5 / 3 / 1 / 218

Brian Uriarte Diego (born 11 August 2008) is a Spanish motorcycle racer currently competing in the 2026 Moto3 World Championship for Red Bull KTM Ajo. He is 2025 Red Bull MotoGP Rookies Cup champion and 2025 FIM JuniorGP World Championship champion.

== Career ==
=== Red Bull Rookies Cup ===
Uriarte confirmed ownership of the 2025 Red Bull MotoGP Rookies Cup at 2025 San Marino and Rimini Riviera motorcycle Grand Prix for what was the finale of the popular youth contest.

=== Moto3 ===
==== Red Bull KTM Ajo (2026–) ====
Due to his performances in the Red Bull MotoGP Rookies Cup, Uriarte was given a ride with the Red Bull KTM Ajo team in 2026 Moto3 World Championship. Uriarte is managed by Emilio Alzamora, a former Grand Prix motorcycle racer famously known for managing Marc Marquez until 2023.

Uriarte will continue with Red Bull KTM Ajo for 2027.

== Career statistics ==
=== European Talent Cup ===
==== Races by year ====
(key) (Races in bold indicate pole position; races in italics indicate fastest lap)

Year	Bike	1	2	3	4	5	6	7	8	9	10	11	12	Pos	Pts
2021	Honda	EST; 9	EST; Ret	VAL; 1	VAL; Ret	BAR; 5	ALG; 2	ARA; 4	ARA; C	JER; 2	JER; 2	VAL; 5	VAL; 2	4th	147
2022	Honda	EST; Ret	EST; Ret	VAL; 2	VAL; Ret	BAR; 1	JER; DSQ	JER; DSQ	ALG; 1	ARA; 3	ARA; 5	VAL; 6		5th	107
2023	Honda	**EST**; 1	**EST**; 1	**VAL**; 8	**VAL**; 2	JER; 2	JER; 1	ALG	**BAR**; 16	ARA; 2	ARA; 4	VAL; Ret		3rd	156

=== Red Bull MotoGP Rookies Cup ===
==== Races by year ====
(key) (Races in bold indicate pole position; races in italics indicate fastest lap)

Year	Bike	1		2		3		4		5		6		7		Pos	Pts
Year	Bike	R1	R2	R1	R2	R1	R2	R1	R2	R1	R2	R1	R2	R1	R2	Pos	Pts
2024	KTM	JER; 6	JER; 3	LMS; 5	LMS; 1	MUG; 2	MUG; 2	ASS; 1	ASS; 4	RBR; 6	RBR; 13	ARA; 3	ARA; 2	MIS; 1	MIS; 3	2nd	230
2025	KTM	JER; 1	JER; 20	LMS; 1	LMS; Ret	ARA; 1	ARA; 2	**MUG**; 6	**MUG**; 5	SAC; 1	SAC; Ret	RBR; 1	RBR; 1	**MIS**; 1	**MIS**; 2	1st	236

=== FIM JuniorGP World Championship ===
==== Races by year ====
(key) (Races in bold indicate pole position; races in italics indicate fastest lap)

Year	Bike	1	2	3	4	5	6	7	8	9	10	11	12	Pos	Pts
2024	KTM	MIS	MIS	EST1	CAT	CAT	ALG	ALG	JER; 2	JER; 1	ARA; **5**	EST2; 4	EST2; 8	10th	78
2025	KTM	EST; 1	**JER**; 1	**JER**; 1	**MAG**; 10	**ARA**; 8	**ARA**; 1	**MIS**; 2	**MIS**; 1	**CAT**; 2	**CAT**; 2	VAL; 2	VAL; 2	1st	239

=== Grand Prix motorcycle racing ===
==== By season ====
Season	Class	Motorcycle	Team	Race	Win	Podium	Pole	FLap	Pts	Plcd
2025	Moto3	KTM	Liqui Moly Dynavolt Intact GP	2	0	0	0	0	11	28th
2025	Moto3	KTM	Red Bull KTM Ajo	2	0	0	0	0	11	28th
2026	Moto3	KTM	Red Bull KTM Ajo	19	2	5	3	1	207*	4th*
Total				**23**	**2**	**5**	**3**	**1**	**218**	

==== By class ====
Class	Seasons	1st GP	1st pod	1st win	Race	Win	Podiums	Pole	FLap	Pts	WChmp
Moto3	2025–present	2025 Australia	2026 Italy	2026 Italy	23	2	5	3	1	218	0
Total	2025–present				**23**	**2**	**5**	**3**	**0**	**218**	**0**

==== Races by year ====
(key) (Races in bold indicate pole position; races in italics indicate fastest lap)

Year	Class	Bike	1	2	3	4	5	6	7	8	9	10	11	12	13	14	15	16	17	18	19	20	21	22	Pos	Pts
2025	Moto3	KTM	THA	ARG	AME	QAT	SPA	FRA	GBR	ARA	ITA	NED	GER	CZE	AUT	HUN	CAT	RSM	JPN	INA	AUS; 19	MAL; 8	POR; 13	VAL; 17	28th	11
2026	Moto3	KTM	THA; 7	BRA; 11	USA; 7	SPA; 11	FRA; 15	CAT; DSQ	ITA; 1	HUN; 4	CZE; 2	NED; 6	**GER**; 1	GBR; 19	ARA; 5	RSM; 3	**AUT**; 2	JPN; 4	**INA**; 3	AUS; C	MAL; 9	QAT; 14	POR	VAL	4th*	207*

* Season still in progress.
