= Álvaro Carpe =

Spanish motorcycle racer (born 2007)

- Carpe at the 2026 Czech Grand Prix
- Nationality: Spanish
- Born: 5 June 2007 (age 19); Murcia, Spain
- Current team: Red Bull KTM Ajo
- Bike number: 83
Motorcycle racing career statistics
Moto3 World Championship
Active years	2024–
Manufacturers	KTM
2025 championship position	4th (215 pts)
Starts / Wins / Podiums / Poles / F. laps / Points; 42 / 0 / 11 / 2 / 5 / 431

Álvaro Carpe Ruiz (born 5 June 2007) is a Spanish motorcycle racer who competes for Red Bull KTM Ajo in the Moto3 World Championship. He won the Red Bull MotoGP Rookies Cup and JuniorGP World Championship, both in 2024.

== Career ==
=== Early career ===
Carpe made his JuniorGP debut in 2022 with the STV-MT Helmets-MSI team on a KTM bike. Due to his underage status, he was unable to compete in the first three races of the championship. He finished 31st without scoring any points.

By 2023, Carpe had become one of the top JuniorGP riders. Carpe competed for the Laglisse Academy team, achieving four podium finishes and finishing third in the championship behind Ángel Piqueras and Luca Lunetta. He also made his Red Bull Rookies Cup debut that same year, finishing runner-up with two wins behind Piqueras.

In 2024, Carpe competed in both championships as one of the favorites after his results the previous year, and did not disappoint by winning both championships. He had won three races in the JuniorGP and four in the Red Bull Rookies Cup. In addition, that same year he debuted in Grand Prix motorcycle racing in the Moto3 category with a wildcard in the Solidarity Grand Prix held in Barcelona.

=== Moto3 World Championship ===
==== Red Bull KTM Ajo (2025–2026) ====
Carpe joined the Moto3 World Championship full-time, signing with Red Bull KTM Ajo in 2025.

=== Moto2 World Championship ===
==== Pramac Yamaha Moto2 (2027–) ====
In 2027, Carpe will step up to the Moto2 World Championship with the Blu Cru Pramac Yamaha Moto2 Team, partnering Alberto Ferrández.

== Career statistics ==
=== European Talent Cup ===
==== Races by year ====
(key) (Races in bold indicate pole position; races in italics indicate fastest lap)

Year	Bike	1	2	3	4	5	6	7	8	9	10	11	12	Pos	Pts
2020	Honda	EST; 8	EST; Ret	ALG; 10	JER; 10	JER; Ret	JER; 9	ARA; 2	ARA; 13	ARA; 8	VAL; 6	VAL; 8		9th	76
2021	Honda	**EST**; Ret	**EST**; 8	VAL; Ret	VAL; 1	CAT; 4	POR; 8	ARA; 7	ARA; C	JER; 9	JER; Ret	VAL; Ret	VAL; 1	5th	95

=== FIM JuniorGP World Championship ===
==== Races by year ====
(key) (Races in bold indicate pole position, races in italics indicate fastest lap)

Year	Moto	1	2	3	4	5	6	7	8	9	10	11	12	Pos	Pts
2022	KTM	EST	VAL	VAL	CAT; 23	CAT; 18	JER; 19	JER; 16	POR; Ret	RSM; DNS	ARA; 16	VAL; 16	VAL; 16	NC	0
2023	Husqvarna	EST; DSQ	VAL; 10	VAL; 3	JER; 2	JER; 2	POR; 5	POR; 4	CAT; 7	CAT; Ret	ARA; 5	VAL; 2	VAL; 5	3rd	137
2024	Husqvarna	RSM; 6	RSM; Ret	EST; 9	CAT; 9	CAT; 1	POR; 1	POR; 3	JER; 3	JER; 3	ARA; 1	**EST**; Ret	**EST**; 6	1st	157

=== Red Bull MotoGP Rookies Cup ===
==== Races by year ====
(key) (Races in bold indicate pole position, races in italics indicate fastest lap)

Year	1	2	3	4	5	6	7	8	9	10	11	12	13	14	Pos	Pts
2023	ALG1; 2	ALG2; 6	JER1; 4	JER2; 3	LMS1; 6	LMS2; Ret	MUG1; 6	MUG2; 8	ASS1; 2	ASS2; 6	RBR1; 1	RBR2; 2	MIS2; 1	MIS2; 3	2nd	203
2024	JER; 4	JER; 1	LMS; 3	LMS; 5	**MUG**; 3	**MUG**; 3	**ASS**; 6	**ASS**; 2	RBR; 1	RBR; 1	**ARA**; 1	**ARA**; 16	RSM; 6	RSM; 2	1st	232

=== Grand Prix motorcycle racing ===
==== By season ====
Season	Class	Motorcycle	Team	Race	Win	Podium	Pole	FLap	Pts	Plcd
2024	Moto3	KTM	Red Bull KTM Ajo	1	0	0	0	0	0	30th
2025	Moto3	KTM	Red Bull KTM Ajo	22	0	5	1	3	215	4th
2026	Moto3	KTM	Red Bull KTM Ajo	19	0	7	1	2	216*	**3rd***
Total				**42**	**0**	**12**	**2**	**5**	**431**	

==== By class ====
Class	Seasons	1st GP	1st pod	1st win	Race	Win	Podiums	Pole	FLap	Pts	WChmp
Moto3	2024–present	2024 Solidarity	2025 Thailand		42	0	12	2	5	431	0
Total	2024–present				**42**	**0**	**12**	**2**	**5**	**431**	0

==== Races by year ====
(key) (Races in bold indicate pole position, races in italics indicate fastest lap)

Year	Class	Bike	1	2	3	4	5	6	7	8	9	10	11	12	13	14	15	16	17	18	19	20	21	22	Pos	Pts
2024	Moto3	KTM	QAT	POR	AME	SPA	FRA	CAT	ITA	NED	GER	GBR	AUT	ARA	RSM	EMI	INA	JPN	AUS	THA	MAL	SLD; 19			30th	0
2025	Moto3	KTM	THA; 2	ARG; NC	AME; 6	QAT; 11	SPA; 8	FRA; 4	GBR; 4	ARA; 3	**ITA**; 2	NED; 4	GER; 5	CZE; 12	AUT; 10	HUN; 9	CAT; 13	RSM; 10	JPN; 14	INA; Ret	AUS; 3	MAL; 5	POR; 5	VAL; 2	4th	215
2026	Moto3	KTM	THA; 4	BRA; 4	**USA**; 3	SPA; 5	FRA; Ret	CAT; 2	ITA; 2	HUN; 3	CZE; 6	NED; Ret	GER; 11	GBR; 2	ARA; 4	RSM; 17	AUT; 3	JPN; 3	INA; Ret	AUS; C	MAL; 3	QAT; 5	POR	VAL	3rd*	216*

* Season still in progress.
