= 2026 Austrian motorcycle Grand Prix =

Motorcycle races in Spielberg

(Austria) 2026 Austrian Grand Prix
Race details
- Race 15 of 22 races in the 2026 Grand Prix motorcycle racing season
- Date: 20 September 2026
- Official name: Qatar Airways Grand Prix of Austria
- Location: Red Bull Ring; Spielberg, Styria, Austria
- Course: Permanent racing facility; 4.348 km (2.702 mi)

MotoGP
Pole position
| Rider | (Spain) Jorge Martín | Aprilia |
| Time | 1:27.917 | |
Fastest lap
| Rider | (Spain) Pedro Acosta | KTM |
| Time | 1:29.533 on lap 4 | |
Podium
| First | (Spain) Pedro Acosta | KTM |
| Second | (Spain) Jorge Martín | Aprilia |
| Third | (Italy) Marco Bezzecchi | Aprilia |

Moto2
Pole position
| Rider | (Czech Republic) Filip Salač | Kalex |
| Time | 1:32.381 | |
Fastest lap
| Rider | (Spain) Izan Guevara | Boscoscuro |
| Time | 1:32.879 on lap 4 | |
Podium
| First | (Spain) Izan Guevara | Boscoscuro |
| Second | (Czech Republic) Filip Salač | Kalex |
| Third | (Colombia) David Alonso | Kalex |

Moto3
Pole position
| Rider | (Spain) Brian Uriarte | KTM |
| Time | 1:39.544 | |
Fastest lap
| Rider | (Spain) David Almansa | KTM |
| Time | 1:39.485 on lap 6 | |
Podium
| First | (Spain) Máximo Quiles | KTM |
| Second | (Spain) Brian Uriarte | KTM |
| Third | (Spain) Álvaro Carpe | KTM |

The 2026 Austrian motorcycle Grand Prix (officially known as the Qatar Airways Grand Prix of Austria) was the fifteenth round of the 2026 Grand Prix motorcycle racing season. All races were held at the Red Bull Ring in Spielberg on 20 September 2026.

In the Moto3 class, KTM won their second consecutive and eighth overall Constructors' Championship after Máximo Quiles's win.

== MotoGP Sprint ==
The MotoGP Sprint was held on 19 September 2026.

| Pos. | No. | Rider | Team | Manufacturer | Laps | Time/Retired | Grid | Points |
|---|---|---|---|---|---|---|---|---|
| 1 | 89 | (Spain) Jorge Martín | Aprilia Racing | Aprilia | 14 | 20:57.387 | 1 | 12 |
| 2 | 93 | (Spain) Marc Márquez | Ducati Lenovo Team | Ducati | 14 | +1.026 | 2 | 9 |
| 3 | 72 | (Italy) Marco Bezzecchi | Aprilia Racing | Aprilia | 14 | +1.675 | 4 | 7 |
| 4 | 79 | (Japan) Ai Ogura | SuperFile Trackhouse MotoGP Team | Aprilia | 14 | +3.495 | 5 | 6 |
| 5 | 73 | (Spain) Álex Márquez | BK8 Gresini Racing MotoGP | Ducati | 14 | +4.447 | 6 | 5 |
| 6 | 63 | (Italy) Francesco Bagnaia | Ducati Lenovo Team | Ducati | 14 | +5.142 | 7 | 4 |
| 7 | 5 | (France) Johann Zarco | Castrol Honda LCR | Honda | 14 | +5.895 | 10 | 3 |
| 8 | 54 | (Spain) Fermín Aldeguer | BK8 Gresini Racing MotoGP | Ducati | 14 | +6.810 | 12 | 2 |
| 9 | 33 | (South Africa) Brad Binder | Red Bull KTM Factory Racing | KTM | 14 | +7.233 | 11 | 1 |
| 10 | 49 | (Italy) Fabio Di Giannantonio | Pertamina Enduro VR46 Racing Team | Ducati | 14 | +9.228 | 8 | |
| 11 | 23 | (Italy) Enea Bastianini | Red Bull KTM Tech3 | KTM | 14 | +11.580 | 17 | |
| 12 | 20 | (France) Fabio Quartararo | Monster Energy Yamaha MotoGP Team | Yamaha | 14 | +13.050 | 9 | |
| 13 | 10 | (Italy) Luca Marini | Honda HRC Castrol | Honda | 14 | +15.076 | 15 | |
| 14 | 44 | (Spain) Pol Espargaró | Red Bull KTM Tech3 | KTM | 14 | +18.373 | 14 | |
| 15 | 30 | (Japan) Takaaki Nakagami | Honda HRC Castrol | Honda | 14 | +19.201 | 18 | |
| 16 | 11 | (Brazil) Diogo Moreira | Pro Honda LCR | Honda | 14 | +20.503 | 16 | |
| 17 | 7 | (Turkey) Toprak Razgatlıoğlu | Prima Pramac Yamaha MotoGP | Yamaha | 14 | +20.964 | 22 | |
| 18 | 42 | (Spain) Álex Rins | Monster Energy Yamaha MotoGP Team | Yamaha | 14 | +21.054 | 20 | |
| 19 | 25 | (Spain) Raúl Fernández | SuperFile Trackhouse MotoGP Team | Aprilia | 14 | +22.646 | 13 | |
| 20 | 43 | (Australia) Jack Miller | Prima Pramac Yamaha MotoGP | Yamaha | 14 | +26.053 | 21 | |
| Ret | 37 | (Spain) Pedro Acosta | Red Bull KTM Factory Racing | KTM | 13 | Accident damage | 3 | |
| Ret | 21 | (Italy) Franco Morbidelli | Pertamina Enduro VR46 Racing Team | Ducati | 10 | Accident | 19 | |
Fastest sprint lap: (Spain) Pedro Acosta (KTM) - 1:28.603 (lap 2)
Official MotoGP Sprint Report

== Race ==
=== MotoGP ===
| Pos. | No. | Rider | Team | Manufacturer | Laps | Time/Retired | Grid | Points |
|---|---|---|---|---|---|---|---|---|
| 1 | 37 | (Spain) Pedro Acosta | Red Bull KTM Factory Racing | KTM | 28 | 42:16.996 | 3 | 25 |
| 2 | 89 | (Spain) Jorge Martín | Aprilia Racing | Aprilia | 28 | +1.017 | 1 | 20 |
| 3 | 72 | (Italy) Marco Bezzecchi | Aprilia Racing | Aprilia | 28 | +1.209 | 4 | 16 |
| 4 | 79 | (Japan) Ai Ogura | SuperFile Trackhouse MotoGP Team | Aprilia | 28 | +2.139 | 5 | 13 |
| 5 | 93 | (Spain) Marc Márquez | Ducati Lenovo Team | Ducati | 28 | +7.339 | 2 | 11 |
| 6 | 33 | (South Africa) Brad Binder | Red Bull KTM Factory Racing | KTM | 28 | +8.720 | 11 | 10 |
| 7 | 63 | (Italy) Francesco Bagnaia | Ducati Lenovo Team | Ducati | 28 | +9.686 | 7 | 9 |
| 8 | 54 | (Spain) Fermín Aldeguer | BK8 Gresini Racing MotoGP | Ducati | 28 | +12.365 (Note: 3-second penalty for failing to comply with a long lap penalty.) | 12 | 8 |
| 9 | 49 | (Italy) Fabio Di Giannantonio | Pertamina Enduro VR46 Racing Team | Ducati | 28 | +14.869 | 8 | 7 |
| 10 | 5 | (France) Johann Zarco | Castrol Honda LCR | Honda | 28 | +16.266 | 10 | 6 |
| 11 | 23 | (Italy) Enea Bastianini | Red Bull KTM Tech3 | KTM | 28 | +16.640 | 17 | 5 |
| 12 | 25 | (Spain) Raúl Fernández | SuperFile Trackhouse MotoGP Team | Aprilia | 28 | +20.940 | 13 | 4 |
| 13 | 30 | (Japan) Takaaki Nakagami | Honda HRC Castrol | Honda | 28 | +21.032 | 18 | 3 |
| 14 | 10 | (Italy) Luca Marini | Honda HRC Castrol | Honda | 28 | +22.391 | 15 | 2 |
| 15 | 11 | (Brazil) Diogo Moreira | Pro Honda LCR | Honda | 28 | +24.949 | 16 | 1 |
| 16 | 44 | (Spain) Pol Espargaró | Red Bull KTM Tech3 | KTM | 28 | +25.148 | 14 | |
| 17 | 20 | (France) Fabio Quartararo | Monster Energy Yamaha MotoGP Team | Yamaha | 28 | +30.140 | 9 | |
| 18 | 21 | (Italy) Franco Morbidelli | Pertamina Enduro VR46 Racing Team | Ducati | 28 | +34.200 | 19 | |
| 19 | 42 | (Spain) Álex Rins | Monster Energy Yamaha MotoGP Team | Yamaha | 28 | +34.413 | 20 | |
| 20 | 7 | (Turkey) Toprak Razgatlıoğlu | Prima Pramac Yamaha MotoGP | Yamaha | 28 | +46.724 | 22 | |
| 21 | 43 | (Australia) Jack Miller | Prima Pramac Yamaha MotoGP | Yamaha | 28 | +1:07.530 | 21 | |
| Ret | 73 | (Spain) Álex Márquez | BK8 Gresini Racing MotoGP | Ducati | 12 | Accident | 6 | |
Fastest lap: (Spain) Pedro Acosta (KTM) – 1:29.533 (lap 4)
Official MotoGP Race Report

== Championship standings after the race ==
Below are the standings for the top five riders, constructors, and teams after the round.

=== MotoGP ===
Riders' Championship standings

| | Pos. | Rider | Points |
|---|---|---|---|
| 1 | 1 | (Spain) Jorge Martín | 306 |
| 1 | 2 | (Spain) Marc Márquez | 294 |
| | 3 | (Italy) Marco Bezzecchi | 264 |
| 1 | 4 | (Spain) Pedro Acosta | 234 |
| 1 | 5 | (Italy) Fabio Di Giannantonio | 230 |

Constructors' Championship standings

| | Pos. | Constructor | Points |
|---|---|---|---|
| 1 | 1 | (Italy) Aprilia | 442 |
| 1 | 2 | (Italy) Ducati | 432 |
| | 3 | (Austria) KTM | 277 |
| | 4 | (Japan) Honda | 146 |
| | 5 | (Japan) Yamaha | 84 |

Teams' Championship standings

| Pos. | Team | Points |
|---|---|---|
| 1 | (Italy) Aprilia Racing | 570 |
| 2 | (Italy) Ducati Lenovo Team | 450 |
| 3 | (United States) SuperFile Trackhouse MotoGP Team | 425 |
| 4 | (Austria) Red Bull KTM Factory Racing | 328 |
| 5 | (Italy) Pertamina Enduro VR46 Racing Team | 286 |

=== Moto2 ===
Riders' Championship standings

| | Pos. | Rider | Points |
|---|---|---|---|
| | 1 | (Spain) Manuel González | 245.5 |
| | 2 | (Spain) Izan Guevara | 210 |
| | 3 | (Spain) Iván Ortolá | 168.5 |
| 1 | 4 | (Colombia) David Alonso | 155 |
| 1 | 5 | (Australia) Senna Agius | 149 |

Constructors' Championship standings

| Pos. | Constructor | Points |
|---|---|---|
| 1 | (Germany) Kalex | 352.5 |
| 2 | (Italy) Boscoscuro | 231 |
| 3 | (Switzerland) Forward | 63 |

Teams' Championship standings

| Pos. | Team | Points |
|---|---|---|
| 1 | (Germany) Liqui Moly Dynavolt Intact GP | 394.5 |
| 2 | (Spain) CFMoto Inde Team | 301 |
| 3 | (Italy) Blu Cru Pramac Yamaha Moto2 | 227.5 |
| 4 | (Spain) QJMotor – Campolor – MSi | 172.5 |
| 5 | (United States) OnlyFans American Racing Team | 172 |

=== Moto3 ===
Riders' Championship standings

| | Pos. | Rider | Points |
|---|---|---|---|
| | 1 | (Spain) Máximo Quiles | 306 |
| 1 | 2 | (Spain) Álvaro Carpe | 175 |
| 1 | 3 | (Spain) David Almansa | 174 |
| | 4 | (Spain) Brian Uriarte | 174 |
| | 5 | (Argentina) Marco Morelli | 146 |

Constructors' Championship standings

| Pos. | Constructor | Points |
|---|---|---|
| 1 | (Austria) KTM | 370 |
| 2 | (Japan) Honda | 185 |

Teams' Championship standings

| Pos. | Team | Points |
|---|---|---|
| 1 | (Spain) CFMoto Gaviota Aspar Team | 452 |
| 2 | (Finland) Red Bull KTM Ajo | 349 |
| 3 | (Germany) Liqui Moly Dynavolt Intact GP | 239 |
| 4 | (France) Red Bull KTM Tech3 | 188 |
| 5 | (Italy) LevelUp – MTA | 145 |

| Previous race: 2026 San Marino Grand Prix | FIM Grand Prix World Championship; 2026 season | Next race: 2026 Japanese Grand Prix |
| Previous race: 2025 Austrian Grand Prix | Austrian motorcycle Grand Prix | Next race: 2027 Austrian Grand Prix |
