= 2026 Australian motorcycle Grand Prix =

Motorcycle races in Phillip Island

(Australia) 2026 Australian Grand Prix
Race details
- Race 18 of 22 races in the 2026 Grand Prix motorcycle racing season
- Date: 25 October 2026
- Official name: Red Bull Grand Prix of Australia
- Location: Phillip Island Grand Prix Circuit; Phillip Island, Victoria, Australia
- Course: Permanent racing facility; 4.448 km (2.764 mi)

MotoGP
Pole position
Rider	(Spain) Marc Márquez	Ducati
Time	1:34.203	

Moto2
Pole position
Rider	(Spain) Manuel González	Kalex
Time	1:30.122	

Moto3
Pole position
Rider	(Indonesia) Veda Pratama	Honda
Time	1:35.299	

The 2026 Australian motorcycle Grand Prix (officially known as the Red Bull Grand Prix of Australia) was the scheduled eighteenth round of the 2026 Grand Prix motorcycle racing season. All races were planned to be held at the Phillip Island Grand Prix Circuit in Phillip Island on 25 October 2026.

The Grand Prix was scheduled to be the last time MotoGP will race at the Phillip Island Grand Prix Circuit as the Australian round will move to the Adelaide Street Circuit in 2027. However, due to inclement weather and poor visibility which affected the medical helicopter's ability to fly, all Sunday races were cancelled; the Saturday MotoGP sprint on 24 October was the only race held. The cancellation marks the first time races in all classes were cancelled on race day since the 2018 British Grand Prix, which was also cancelled due to inclement weather and track conditions.

Due to the race's cancellation, Kalex's points were enough to clinch their fourteenth consecutive Moto2 Constructors' Championship.

== MotoGP Sprint ==
The MotoGP Sprint was held on 24 October 2026.

Pos.	No.	Rider	Team	Manufacturer	Laps	Time/Retired	Grid	Points
1	93	(Spain) Marc Márquez	Ducati Lenovo Team	Ducati	13	19:09.411	1	12
2	73	(Spain) Álex Márquez	BK8 Gresini Racing MotoGP	Ducati	13	+0.323	2	9
3	49	(Italy) Fabio Di Giannantonio	Pertamina Enduro VR46 Racing Team	Ducati	13	+0.590	8	7
4	72	(Italy) Marco Bezzecchi	Aprilia Racing	Aprilia	13	+1.074	9	6
5	37	(Spain) Pedro Acosta	Red Bull KTM Factory Racing	KTM	13	+3.689	7	5
6	33	(South Africa) Brad Binder	Red Bull KTM Factory Racing	KTM	13	+7.433	13	4
7	43	(Australia) Jack Miller	Prima Pramac Yamaha MotoGP	Yamaha	13	+7.782	5	3
8	11	(Brazil) Diogo Moreira	Pro Honda LCR	Honda	13	+10.722	10	2
9	27	(Spain) Iker Lecuona	BK8 Gresini Racing MotoGP	Ducati	13	+10.773	14	1
10	20	(France) Fabio Quartararo	Monster Energy Yamaha MotoGP Team	Yamaha	13	+11.215	19	
11	23	(Italy) Enea Bastianini	Red Bull KTM Tech3	KTM	13	+11.437	11	
12	42	(Spain) Álex Rins	Monster Energy Yamaha MotoGP Team	Yamaha	13	+11.568	18	
13	79	(Japan) Ai Ogura	SuperFile Trackhouse MotoGP Team	Aprilia	13	+14.166 (Note: 8-second penalty due to low tyre pressure.)	12	
14	21	(Italy) Franco Morbidelli	Pertamina Enduro VR46 Racing Team	Ducati	13	+18.277	20	
15	47	(Spain) Augusto Fernández	Prima Pramac Yamaha MotoGP	Yamaha	13	+45.945	17	
Ret	25	(Spain) Raúl Fernández	SuperFile Trackhouse MotoGP Team	Aprilia	8	Injury	6	
Ret	89	(Spain) Jorge Martín	Aprilia Racing	Aprilia	7	Accident	4	
Ret	12	(Spain) Maverick Viñales	Red Bull KTM Tech3	KTM	6	Technical	15	
Ret	5	(France) Johann Zarco	Castrol Honda LCR	Honda	3	Technical	3	
Ret	63	(Italy) Francesco Bagnaia	Ducati Lenovo Team	Ducati	2	Technical	16	
WD	10	(Italy) Luca Marini	Honda HRC Castrol	Honda		Illness		
Fastest sprint lap: (Spain) Jorge Martín (Aprilia) - 1:27.229 (lap 4)
Official MotoGP Sprint Report

== Championship standings after the race ==
Below are the standings for the top five riders, constructors, and teams after the round. Since only the MotoGP sprint was the points-scoring event that was held, only the MotoGP standings changed; the Moto2 and Moto3 standings remain unchanged from the previous Grand Prix.

=== MotoGP ===
Riders' Championship standings

	Pos.	Rider	Points
1	1	(Spain) Marc Márquez	365
1	2	(Spain) Jorge Martín	355
	3	(Italy) Marco Bezzecchi	315
1	4	(Spain) Pedro Acosta	263
1	5	(Japan) Ai Ogura	259

Constructors' Championship standings

Pos.	Constructor	Points
1	(Italy) Aprilia	509
2	(Italy) Ducati	503
3	(Austria) KTM	316
4	(Japan) Honda	167
5	(Japan) Yamaha	100

Teams' Championship standings

Pos.	Team	Points
1	(Italy) Aprilia Racing	670
2	(Italy) Ducati Lenovo Team	531
3	(United States) SuperFile Trackhouse MotoGP Team	495
4	(Austria) Red Bull KTM Factory Racing	371
5	(Italy) BK8 Gresini Racing MotoGP	316

=== Moto2 ===
Riders' Championship standings

Pos.	Rider	Points
1	(Spain) Manuel González	265.5
2	(Spain) Izan Guevara	260
3	(Spain) Iván Ortolá	191.5
4	(Spain) Daniel Holgado	170
5	(Colombia) David Alonso	166

Constructors' Championship standings

Pos.	Constructor	Points
1	(Germany) Kalex	392.5
2	(Italy) Boscoscuro	281
3	(Switzerland) Forward	63

Teams' Championship standings

Pos.	Team	Points
1	(Germany) Liqui Moly Dynavolt Intact GP	430.5
2	(Spain) CFMoto Power Electronics Aspar Team	336
3	(Italy) Blu Cru Pramac Yamaha Moto2	277.5
4	(United States) OnlyFans American Racing Team	197
5	(Spain) QJMotor – R.O.M.E.A. – MSi	195.5

=== Moto3 ===
Riders' Championship standings

Pos.	Rider	Points
1	(Spain) Máximo Quiles	351
2	(Spain) David Almansa	217
3	(Spain) Brian Uriarte	198
4	(Spain) Álvaro Carpe	189
5	(Spain) Adrián Fernández	148

Constructors' Championship standings

Pos.	Constructor	Points
1	(Austria) KTM	420
2	(Japan) Honda	213

Teams' Championship standings

Pos.	Team	Points
1	(Spain) CFMoto Gaviota Aspar Team	491
2	(Finland) Red Bull KTM Ajo	387
3	(Germany) Liqui Moly Dynavolt Intact GP	285
4	(Luxembourg) Leopard Racing	225
5	(France) Red Bull KTM Tech3	209

== Notes ==
Previous race: 2026 Indonesian Grand Prix	FIM Grand Prix World Championship; 2026 season	Next race: 2026 Malaysian Grand Prix
Previous race: 2025 Australian Grand Prix	Australian motorcycle Grand Prix	Next race: 2027 Australian Grand Prix
