= 2026 Aragon motorcycle Grand Prix =

Motorcycle race in Alcañiz

2026 Aragon Grand Prix
Race details
- Race 13 of 22 races in the 2026 Grand Prix motorcycle racing season
- Date: 30 August 2026
- Official name: Michelin Grand Prix of Aragón
- Location: MotorLand Aragón; Alcañiz, Spain
- Course: Permanent racing facility; 5.077 km (3.155 mi)

MotoGP
Pole position
Rider	(Italy) Marco Bezzecchi	Aprilia
Time	1:44.962	
Fastest lap
Rider	(Spain) Marc Márquez	Ducati
Time	1:46.736 on lap 14	
Podium
First	(Spain) Marc Márquez	Ducati
Second	(Spain) Pedro Acosta	KTM
Third	(Italy) Marco Bezzecchi	Aprilia

Moto2
Pole position
Rider	(Spain) Alonso López	Kalex
Time	1:49.405	
Fastest lap
Rider	(Spain) Iván Ortolá	Kalex
Time	1:50.198 on lap 7	
Podium
First	(Spain) Alonso López	Kalex
Second	(Spain) Izan Guevara	Boscoscuro
Third	(Colombia) David Alonso	Kalex

Moto3
Pole position
Rider	(Spain) David Almansa	KTM
Time	1:56.347	
Fastest lap
Rider	(Argentina) Marco Morelli	KTM
Time	1:56.675 on lap 5	
Podium
First	(Spain) Máximo Quiles	KTM
Second	(Spain) David Almansa	KTM
Third	(Argentina) Marco Morelli	KTM

The 2026 Aragon motorcycle Grand Prix (officially known as the Michelin Grand Prix of Aragon) was the thirteenth round of the 2026 Grand Prix motorcycle racing season. All races were held at the MotorLand Aragón in Alcañiz on 30 August 2026.

== MotoGP Sprint ==
The MotoGP Sprint was held on 29 August 2026.

Pos.	No.	Rider	Team	Manufacturer	Laps	Time/Retired	Grid	Points
1	93	(Spain) Marc Márquez	Ducati Lenovo Team	Ducati	11	19:37.995	2	12
2	73	(Spain) Álex Márquez	BK8 Gresini Racing MotoGP	Ducati	11	+1.140	3	9
3	72	(Italy) Marco Bezzecchi	Aprilia Racing	Aprilia	11	+2.089	1	7
4	37	(Spain) Pedro Acosta	Red Bull KTM Factory Racing	KTM	11	+2.648	6	6
5	89	(Spain) Jorge Martín	Aprilia Racing	Aprilia	11	+6.237	5	5
6	54	(Spain) Fermín Aldeguer	BK8 Gresini Racing MotoGP	Ducati	11	+10.475	11	4
7	11	(Brazil) Diogo Moreira	Pro Honda LCR	Honda	11	+11.071	10	3
8	25	(Spain) Raúl Fernández	SuperFile Trackhouse MotoGP Team	Aprilia	11	+11.213	4	2
9	5	(France) Johann Zarco	Castrol Honda LCR	Honda	11	+12.021	9	1
10	43	(Australia) Jack Miller	Prima Pramac Yamaha MotoGP	Yamaha	11	+12.166	13	
11	63	(Italy) Francesco Bagnaia	Ducati Lenovo Team	Ducati	11	+14.575	8	
12	42	(Spain) Álex Rins	Monster Energy Yamaha MotoGP Team	Yamaha	11	+14.648	19	
13	7	(Turkey) Toprak Razgatlıoğlu	Prima Pramac Yamaha MotoGP	Yamaha	11	+15.776	21	
14	23	(Italy) Enea Bastianini	Red Bull KTM Tech3	KTM	11	+16.051	16	
15	33	(South Africa) Brad Binder	Red Bull KTM Factory Racing	KTM	11	+16.761	14	
16	36	(Spain) Joan Mir	Honda HRC Castrol	Honda	11	+19.845	15	
17	44	(Spain) Pol Espargaró	Red Bull KTM Tech3	KTM	11	+23.160	20	
18	21	(Italy) Franco Morbidelli	Pertamina Enduro VR46 Racing Team	Ducati	11	+25.074	12	
19	32	(Italy) Lorenzo Savadori	SuperFile Trackhouse MotoGP Team	Aprilia	11	+27.798	22	
Ret	20	(France) Fabio Quartararo	Monster Energy Yamaha MotoGP Team	Yamaha	4	Engine	17	
Ret	49	(Italy) Fabio Di Giannantonio	Pertamina Enduro VR46 Racing Team	Ducati	1	Accident	7	
Ret	10	(Italy) Luca Marini	Honda HRC Castrol	Honda	0	Accident	18	
Fastest sprint lap: (Spain) Marc Márquez (Ducati) - 1:46.486 (lap 3)
Official MotoGP Sprint Report

== Race ==
=== MotoGP ===
Pos.	No.	Rider	Team	Manufacturer	Laps	Time/Retired	Grid	Points
1	93	(Spain) Marc Márquez	Ducati Lenovo Team	Ducati	23	41:10.969	2	25
2	37	(Spain) Pedro Acosta	Red Bull KTM Factory Racing	KTM	23	+1.754	6	20
3	72	(Italy) Marco Bezzecchi	Aprilia Racing	Aprilia	23	+3.629	1	16
4	73	(Spain) Álex Márquez	BK8 Gresini Racing MotoGP	Ducati	23	+8.687	3	13
5	89	(Spain) Jorge Martín	Aprilia Racing	Aprilia	23	+12.572	5	11
6	54	(Spain) Fermín Aldeguer	BK8 Gresini Racing MotoGP	Ducati	23	+17.687	11	10
7	49	(Italy) Fabio Di Giannantonio	Pertamina Enduro VR46 Racing Team	Ducati	23	+23.136	7	9
8	23	(Italy) Enea Bastianini	Red Bull KTM Tech3	KTM	23	+25.741	16	8
9	11	(Brazil) Diogo Moreira	Pro Honda LCR	Honda	23	+25.899	10	7
10	33	(South Africa) Brad Binder	Red Bull KTM Factory Racing	KTM	23	+26.441	14	6
11	43	(Australia) Jack Miller	Prima Pramac Yamaha MotoGP	Yamaha	23	+27.206	13	5
12	36	(Spain) Joan Mir	Honda HRC Castrol	Honda	23	+27.999	15	4
13	42	(Spain) Álex Rins	Monster Energy Yamaha MotoGP Team	Yamaha	23	+28.276	19	3
14	10	(Italy) Luca Marini	Honda HRC Castrol	Honda	23	+29.794	18	2
15	5	(France) Johann Zarco	Castrol Honda LCR	Honda	23	+30.003	9	1
16	44	(Spain) Pol Espargaró	Red Bull KTM Tech3	KTM	23	+35.874	20	
17	32	(Italy) Lorenzo Savadori	SuperFile Trackhouse MotoGP Team	Aprilia	23	+49.761	22	
18	20	(France) Fabio Quartararo	Monster Energy Yamaha MotoGP Team	Yamaha	23	+51.657	17	
Ret	7	(Turkey) Toprak Razgatlıoğlu	Prima Pramac Yamaha MotoGP	Yamaha	20	Accident	21	
Ret	25	(Spain) Raúl Fernández	SuperFile Trackhouse MotoGP Team	Aprilia	6	Gearbox	4	
Ret	21	(Italy) Franco Morbidelli	Pertamina Enduro VR46 Racing Team	Ducati	5	Accident	12	
Ret	63	(Italy) Francesco Bagnaia	Ducati Lenovo Team	Ducati	5	Accident	8	
Fastest lap: (Spain) Marc Márquez (Ducati) – 1:46.736 (lap 14)
Official MotoGP Race Report

== Championship standings after the race ==
Below are the standings for the top five riders, constructors, and teams after the round.

=== MotoGP ===
Riders' Championship standings

	Pos.	Rider	Points
	1	(Spain) Jorge Martín	256
2	2	(Spain) Marc Márquez	237
1	3	(Italy) Marco Bezzecchi	232
1	4	(Italy) Fabio Di Giannantonio	208
2	5	(Japan) Ai Ogura	203

Constructors' Championship standings

Pos.	Constructor	Points
1	(Italy) Aprilia	390
2	(Italy) Ducati	375
3	(Austria) KTM	231
4	(Japan) Honda	129
5	(Japan) Yamaha	78

Teams' Championship standings

	Pos.	Team	Points
	1	(Italy) Aprilia Racing	488
	2	(United States) SuperFile Trackhouse MotoGP Team	389
	3	(Italy) Ducati Lenovo Team	380
1	4	(Austria) Red Bull KTM Factory Racing	267
1	5	(Italy) Pertamina Enduro VR46 Racing Team	261

=== Moto2 ===
Riders' Championship standings

Pos.	Rider	Points
1	(Spain) Manuel González	207.5
2	(Spain) Izan Guevara	175
3	(Australia) Senna Agius	149
4	(Spain) Iván Ortolá	144.5
5	(Spain) Daniel Holgado	137

Constructors' Championship standings

Pos.	Constructor	Points
1	(Germany) Kalex	307.5
2	(Italy) Boscoscuro	196
3	(Switzerland) Forward	57

Teams' Championship standings

	Pos.	Team	Points
	1	(Germany) Liqui Moly Dynavolt Intact GP	356.5
	2	(Spain) CFMoto Inde Aspar Team	269
	3	(Italy) Blu Cru Pramac Yamaha Moto2	190.5
1	4	(Spain) QJMotor – Reverte – MSi	148.5
1	5	(United States) OnlyFans American Racing Team	148

=== Moto3 ===
Riders' Championship standings

Pos.	Rider	Points
1	(Spain) Máximo Quiles	256
2	(Spain) Álvaro Carpe	159
3	(Spain) David Almansa	154
4	(Spain) Brian Uriarte	138
5	(Argentina) Marco Morelli	131

Constructors' Championship standings

Pos.	Constructor	Points
1	(Austria) KTM	320
2	(Japan) Honda	163

Teams' Championship standings

Pos.	Team	Points
1	(Spain) CFMoto Viel Aspar Team	387
2	(Finland) Red Bull KTM Ajo	297
3	(Germany) Liqui Moly Dynavolt Intact GP	214
4	(France) Red Bull KTM Tech3	163
5	(Italy) LevelUp – MTA	130

Previous race: 2026 British Grand Prix	FIM Grand Prix World Championship; 2026 season	Next race: 2026 San Marino Grand Prix
Previous race: 2025 Aragon Grand Prix	Aragon motorcycle Grand Prix	Next race: 2027 Aragon Grand Prix
