= 2026 Portuguese motorcycle Grand Prix =

Motorcycle races in Portimão

(Portugal) 2026 Portuguese Grand Prix
Race details
- Race 21 of 22 races in the 2026 Grand Prix motorcycle racing season
- Date: 22 November 2026
- Official name: Repsol Grand Prix of Portugal
- Location: Algarve International Circuit; Portimão, Algarve, Portugal
- Course: Permanent racing facility; 4.592 km (2.853 mi)

MotoGP
Pole position
Rider	(Italy) Marco Bezzecchi	Aprilia
Time	1:37.201	
Fastest lap
Rider	(Italy) Marco Bezzecchi	Aprilia
Time	1:39.121 on lap 15	
Podium
First	(Italy) Marco Bezzecchi	Aprilia
Second	(Spain) Jorge Martín	Aprilia
Third	(Spain) Raúl Fernández	Aprilia

Moto2
Pole position
Rider	(Australia) Senna Agius	Kalex
Time	1:40.547	
Fastest lap
Rider	(Spain) Daniel Muñoz	Kalex
Time	1:41.391 on lap 2	
Podium
First	(Spain) Daniel Muñoz	Kalex
Second	(Spain) Alonso López	Kalex
Third	(Australia) Senna Agius	Kalex

Moto3
Pole position
Rider	(Spain) David Almansa	KTM
Time	1:45.652	
Fastest lap
Rider	(Spain) Adrián Fernández	Honda
Time	1:48.874 on lap 11	
Podium
First	(Spain) Máximo Quiles	KTM
Second	(Finland) Rico Salmela	KTM
Third	(Spain) Adrián Fernández	Honda

The 2026 Portuguese motorcycle Grand Prix (officially known as the Repsol Grand Prix of Portugal) was the twenty-first round of the 2026 Grand Prix motorcycle racing season. All races were held at the Autódromo Internacional do Algarve in Portimão on 22 November 2026. Initially scheduled for 15 November, the race was moved one week later to accommodate the Qatar Grand Prix which was rescheduled from 12 April to 8 November due to the Iran war.

In the MotoGP class, Aprilia Racing secured enough points during the sprint to clinch their first Teams' Championship.

Previous race: 2026 Qatar Grand Prix	FIM Grand Prix World Championship; 2026 season	Next race: 2026 Valencian Grand Prix
Previous race: 2025 Portuguese Grand Prix	Portuguese motorcycle Grand Prix	Next race: 2027 Portuguese Grand Prix
