= 2025 Thailand motorcycle Grand Prix =

Motorcycle races in Buriram

2025 Thailand Grand Prix
Race details
- Race 1 of 22 races in the 2025 Grand Prix motorcycle racing season
- Date: 2 March 2025
- Official name: PT Grand Prix of Thailand
- Location: Chang International Circuit; Buriram, Thailand
- Course: Permanent racing facility; 4.554 km (2.830 mi)

MotoGP
Pole position
Rider	(Spain) Marc Márquez	Ducati
Time	1:28.782	
Fastest lap
Rider	(Spain) Marc Márquez	Ducati
Time	1:30.637 on lap 4	
Podium
First	(Spain) Marc Márquez	Ducati
Second	(Spain) Álex Márquez	Ducati
Third	(Italy) Francesco Bagnaia	Ducati

Moto2
Pole position
Rider	(Spain) Manuel González	Kalex
Time	1:34.634	
Fastest lap
Rider	(Spain) Manuel González	Kalex
Time	1:35.390 on lap 4	
Podium
First	(Spain) Manuel González	Kalex
Second	(Spain) Arón Canet	Kalex
Third	(Australia) Senna Agius	Kalex

Moto3
Pole position
Rider	(Italy) Matteo Bertelle	KTM
Time	1:40.400	
Fastest lap
Rider	(Spain) David Muñoz	KTM
Time	1:41.042 on lap 9	
Podium
First	(Spain) José Antonio Rueda	KTM
Second	(Spain) Álvaro Carpe	KTM
Third	(Spain) Adrián Fernández	Honda

The 2025 Thailand motorcycle Grand Prix (officially known as the PT Grand Prix of Thailand) was the first round of the 2025 Grand Prix motorcycle racing season. All races were held at the Chang International Circuit in Buriram on 2 March 2025.

== Background ==
Reigning World Champion and factory Aprilia rider Jorge Martín missed this round due to a wrist injury, and was replaced by Aprilia test rider Lorenzo Savadori.

== Practice session ==
=== MotoGP ===
==== Combined Free Practice 1-2 ====
Practice times (written in bold) are the fastest times in the session.

Fastest session lap

Pos.	No.	Biker	Constructor	Practice times	
Pos.	No.	Biker	Constructor	P1	P2
1	93	(Spain) Marc Márquez	Ducati	**1:29.423**	1:29.699
2	21	(Italy) Franco Morbidelli	Ducati	**1:29.581**	1:29.629
3	20	(France) Fabio Quartararo	Yamaha	**1:29.765**	1:30.369
4	43	(Australia) Jack Miller	Yamaha	**1:29.840**	1:30.510
5	72	(Italy) Marco Bezzecchi	Aprilia	**1:29.851**	1:30.499
6	79	(Japan) Ai Ogura	Aprilia	**1:29.919**	1:30.206
7	73	(Spain) Álex Márquez	Ducati	**1:29.944**	1:30.068
8	63	(Italy) Francesco Bagnaia	Ducati	1:30.141	**1:29.967**
9	54	(Spain) Fermín Aldeguer	Ducati	1:30.269	**1:29.977**
10	88	(Portugal) Miguel Oliveira	Yamaha	**1:30.018**	1:30.558
11	12	(Spain) Maverick Viñales	KTM	**1:30.054**	1:30.689
12	5	(France) Johann Zarco	Honda	1:30.219	**1:30.211**
13	10	(Italy) Luca Marini	Honda	**1:30.233**	1:30.481
14	36	(Spain) Joan Mir	Honda	**1:30.241**	1:30.412
15	49	(Italy) Fabio Di Giannantonio	Ducati	1:30.537	**1:30.279**
16	42	(Spain) Álex Rins	Yamaha	**1:30.341**	1:30.995
17	35	(Thailand) Somkiat Chantra	Honda	1:30.471	**1:30.360**
18	37	(Spain) Pedro Acosta	KTM	**1:30.385**	1:30.492
19	25	(Spain) Raúl Fernández	Aprilia	1:31.040	**1:30.433**
20	33	(South Africa) Brad Binder	KTM	1:30.640	**1:30.559**
21	23	(Italy) Enea Bastianini	KTM	1:30.722	**1:30.675**
22	32	(Italy) Lorenzo Savadori	Aprilia	**1:31.844**	1:31.938
OFFICIAL MOTOGP COMBINED PRACTICE TIMES REPORT

==== Practice ====
The top 10 riders (written in bold) qualified for Q2.

Fastest session lap

Pos.	No.	Biker	Constructor	
Pos.	No.	Biker	Constructor	Time results
1	73	**(Spain) Álex Márquez**	**Ducati**	**1:29.020**
2	93	**(Spain) Marc Márquez**	**Ducati**	**1:29.072**
3	37	**(Spain) Pedro Acosta**	**KTM**	**1:29.262**
4	72	**(Italy) Marco Bezzecchi**	**Aprilia**	**1:29.267**
5	21	**(Italy) Franco Morbidelli**	**Ducati**	**1:29.306**
6	36	**(Spain) Joan Mir**	**Honda**	**1:29.398**
7	25	**(Spain) Raúl Fernández**	**Aprilia**	**1:29.462**
8	20	**(France) Fabio Quartararo**	**Yamaha**	**1:29.485**
9	79	**(Japan) Ai Ogura**	**Aprilia**	**1:29.597**
10	5	**(France) Johann Zarco**	**Honda**	**1:29.608**
11	12	(Spain) Maverick Viñales	KTM	1:29.681
12	33	(South Africa) Brad Binder	KTM	1:29.695
13	63	(Italy) Francesco Bagnaia	Ducati	1:29.711
14	43	(Australia) Jack Miller	Yamaha	1:29.746
15	49	(Italy) Fabio Di Giannantonio	Ducati	1:29.753
16	10	(Italy) Luca Marini	Honda	1:29.787
17	88	(Portugal) Miguel Oliveira	Yamaha	1:29.985
18	23	(Italy) Enea Bastianini	KTM	1:30.165
19	54	(Spain) Fermín Aldeguer	Ducati	1:30.269
20	35	(Thailand) Somkiat Chantra	Honda	1:30.286
21	32	(Italy) Lorenzo Savadori	Aprilia	1:31.024
NC	42	(Spain) Álex Rins	Yamaha	~~1:30.995~~
OFFICIAL MOTOGP PRACTICE TIMES REPORT

=== Moto2 ===
==== Combined Practice 1-2 ====
Fastest session lap

Pos.	No.	Biker	Constructor	Practice times	
Pos.	No.	Biker	Constructor	P1	P2
1	18	(Spain) Manuel González	Kalex	1:34.591	1:35.133
2	53	(Turkey) Deniz Öncü	Kalex	1:34.871	1:34.720
3	44	(Spain) Arón Canet	Kalex	1:35.521	1:34.775
4	84	(Netherlands) Zonta van den Goorbergh	Kalex	1:36.096	1:34.951
5	64	(Indonesia) Mario Aji	Kalex	1:35.871	1:35.012
6	13	(Italy) Celestino Vietti	Boscoscuro	1:35.657	1:35.082
7	7	(Belgium) Barry Baltus	Kalex	1:35.758	1:35.095
8	24	(Spain) Marcos Ramírez	Kalex	1:35.776	1:35.138
9	9	(Spain) Jorge Navarro	Forward	1:36.236	1:35.183
10	10	(Brazil) Diogo Moreira	Kalex	1:35.192	1:35.423
11	75	(Spain) Albert Arenas	Kalex	1:35.625	1:35.241
12	14	(Italy) Tony Arbolino	Boscoscuro	1:35.323	1:35.684
13	12	(Czech Republic) Filip Salač	Boscoscuro	1:35.383	1:35.327
14	96	(United Kingdom) Jake Dixon	Boscoscuro	1:35.364	1:35.411
15	92	(Japan) Yuki Kunii	Kalex	1:36.211	1:35.387
16	11	(Spain) Álex Escrig	Forward	1:36.469	1:35.405
17	28	(Spain) Izan Guevara	Boscoscuro	1:35.456	1:35.483
18	15	(South Africa) Darryn Binder	Kalex	1:35.554	1:35.489
19	81	(Australia) Senna Agius	Kalex	1:35.505	1:35.502
20	27	(Spain) Daniel Holgado	Kalex	1:36.037	1:35.535
21	21	(Spain) Alonso López	Boscoscuro	1:35.562	1:35.560
22	95	(Netherlands) Collin Veijer	Kalex	1:36.361	1:35.669
23	16	(United States) Joe Roberts	Kalex	1:36.400	1:35.710
24	71	(Japan) Ayumu Sasaki	Kalex	1:36.377	1:35.733
25	80	(Colombia) David Alonso	Kalex	1:35.779	1:35.924
26	4	(Spain) Iván Ortolá	Boscoscuro	1:36.153	1:35.795
27	99	(Spain) Adrián Huertas	Kalex	1:36.108	1:36.125
28	66	(Spain) Óscar Gutiérrez	Boscoscuro	1:36.742	1:36.271
OFFICIAL MOTO2 FREE PRACTICE TIMES REPORT

==== Practice ====
The top 14 riders (written in bold) qualified for Q2.

Pos.	No.	Biker	Constructor	Time results
Pos.	No.	Biker	Constructor	P1
1	10	**(Brazil) Diogo Moreira**	**Kalex**	1:35.030
2	18	**(Spain) Manuel González**	**Kalex**	1:35.088
3	53	**(Turkey) Deniz Öncü**	**Kalex**	1:35.228
4	64	**(Indonesia) Mario Aji**	**Kalex**	1:35.259
5	9	**(Spain) Jorge Navarro**	**Forward**	1:35.315
6	24	**(Spain) Marcos Ramírez**	**Kalex**	1:35.368
7	96	**(United Kingdom) Jake Dixon**	**Boscoscuro**	1:35.390
8	75	**(Spain) Albert Arenas**	**Kalex**	1:35.399
9	81	**(Australia) Senna Agius**	**Kalex**	1:35.422
10	21	**(Spain) Alonso López**	**Boscoscuro**	1:35.424
11	44	**(Spain) Arón Canet**	**Kalex**	1:35.426
12	28	**(Spain) Izan Guevara**	**Boscoscuro**	1:35.430
13	12	**(Czech Republic) Filip Salač**	**Boscoscuro**	1:35.435
14	7	**(Belgium) Barry Baltus**	**Kalex**	1:35.465
15	15	(South Africa) Darryn Binder	Kalex	1:35.469
16	13	(Italy) Celestino Vietti	Boscoscuro	1:35.548
17	27	(Spain) Daniel Holgado	Kalex	1:35.628
18	71	(Japan) Ayumu Sasaki	Kalex	1:35.655
19	16	(United States) Joe Roberts	Kalex	1:35.692
20	14	(Italy) Tony Arbolino	Boscoscuro	1:35.698
21	80	(Colombia) David Alonso	Kalex	1:35.721
22	84	(Netherlands) Zonta van den Goorbergh	Kalex	1:35.882
23	4	(Spain) Iván Ortolá	Boscoscuro	1:35.890
24	92	(Japan) Yuki Kunii	Kalex	1:36.101
25	99	(Spain) Adrián Huertas	Kalex	1:36.119
26	95	(Netherlands) Collin Veijer	Kalex	1:36.124
27	11	(Spain) Álex Escrig	Forward	1:36.450
28	66	(Spain) Óscar Gutiérrez	Boscoscuro	1:36.464
OFFICIAL MOTO2 PRACTICE TIMES REPORT

=== Moto3 ===
==== Combined Practice 1-2 ====
Fastest session lap

Pos.	No.	Biker	Constructor	Practice times	
Pos.	No.	Biker	Constructor	P1	P2
1	99	(Spain) José Antonio Rueda	KTM	1:40.901	1:40.350
2	31	(Spain) Adrián Fernández	Honda	1:41.404	1:40.506
3	82	(Italy) Stefano Nepa	Honda	1:41.289	1:40.655
4	66	(Australia) Joel Kelso	KTM	1:41.236	1:40.659
5	22	(Spain) David Almansa	Honda	1:41.154	1:40.709
6	83	(Spain) Álvaro Carpe	KTM	1:41.620	1:40.805
7	71	(Italy) Dennis Foggia	KTM	1:41.290	1:40.812
8	6	(Japan) Ryusei Yamanaka	KTM	1:40.851	1:40.961
9	58	(Italy) Luca Lunetta	Honda	1:41.098	1:40.867
10	64	(Spain) David Muñoz	KTM	1:41.687	1:40.878
11	18	(Italy) Matteo Bertelle	KTM	1:41.017	1:41.057
12	94	(Italy) Guido Pini	KTM	1:42.237	1:41.190
13	10	(Italy) Nicola Carraro	Honda	1:41.755	1:41.282
14	14	(New Zealand) Cormac Buchanan	KTM	1:42.509	1:41.298
15	19	(United Kingdom) Scott Ogden	KTM	1:41.374	1:41.329
16	54	(Italy) Riccardo Rossi	Honda	1:41.653	1:41.338
17	28	(Spain) Joel Esteban	KTM	1:42.290	1:41.427
18	11	(Spain) Adrián Cruces	KTM	1:43.684	1:41.456
19	36	(Spain) Ángel Piqueras	KTM	1:41.519	1:41.464
20	21	(South Africa) Ruche Moodley	KTM	1:41.969	1:41.499
21	34	(Austria) Jakob Rosenthaler	KTM	1:43.275	1:41.552
22	73	(Argentina) Valentín Perrone	KTM	1:43.539	1:41.665
23	5	(Thailand) Tatchakorn Buasri	Honda	1:41.794	1:42.285
24	72	(Japan) Taiyo Furusato	Honda	1:41.829	1:42.306
25	8	(United Kingdom) Eddie O'Shea	Honda	1:42.605	1:41.936
26	89	(Spain) Marcos Uriarte	Honda	1:42.884	1:42.132
OFFICIAL MOTO3 FREE PRACTICE TIMES REPORT

==== Practice ====
The top 14 riders (written in bold) qualified for Q2.

Pos.	No.	Biker	Constructor	Practice times
Pos.	No.	Biker	Constructor	P1
1	18	(Italy) **Matteo Bertelle**	**KTM**	**1:40.931**
2	82	(Italy) **Stefano Nepa**	**Honda**	**1:41.166**
3	99	(Spain) **José Antonio Rueda**	**KTM**	**1:41.191**
4	6	(Japan) **Ryusei Yamanaka**	**KTM**	**1:41.230**
5	36	(Spain) **Ángel Piqueras**	**KTM**	**1:41.261**
6	31	(Spain) **Adrián Fernández**	**Honda**	**1:41.370**
7	22	(Spain) **David Almansa**	**Honda**	**1:41.390**
8	64	(Spain) **David Muñoz**	**KTM**	**1:41.436**
9	72	(Japan) **Taiyo Furusato**	**Honda**	**1:41.549**
10	54	(Italy) **Riccardo Rossi**	**Honda**	**1:41.560**
11	10	(Italy) **Nicola Carraro**	**Honda**	'**1:41.587**
12	66	(Australia) **Joel Kelso**	**KTM**	**1:41.644**
13	19	(United Kingdom) **Scott Ogden**	**KTM**	**1:41.668**
14	58	(Italy) **Luca Lunetta**	**Honda**	**1:41.712**
15	71	(Italy) Dennis Foggia	KTM	1:41.736
16	5	(Thailand) Tatchakorn Buasri	Honda	1:41.923
17	94	(Italy) Guido Pini	KTM	1:42.057
18	78	(Spain) Joel Esteban	KTM	1:42.113
19	83	(Spain) Álvaro Carpe	KTM	1:42.132
20	11	(Spain) Adrián Cruces	KTM	1:42.279
21	89	(Spain) Marcos Uriarte	Honda	1:42.337
22	73	(Argentina) Valentín Perrone	KTM	1:42.395
23	14	(New Zealand) Cormac Buchanan	KTM	1:42.449
24	21	(South Africa) Ruche Moodley	KTM	1:42.679
25	34	(Austria) Jakob Rosenthaler	KTM	1:42.956
NC	8	(United Kingdom) Eddie O'Shea	Honda	No time
OFFICIAL MOTO3 PRACTICE TIMES REPORT

== Qualifying ==
=== MotoGP ===
Fastest session lap

Pos.	No.	Rider	Team	Constructor	Q1	Q2	Final grid
1	93	(Spain) Marc Márquez	Ducati Lenovo Team	Ducati	Qualified to Q2	1:28.782	1
2	73	(Spain) Álex Márquez	BK8 Gresini Racing MotoGP	Ducati	Qualified to Q2	1:28.928	2
3	63	(Italy) Francesco Bagnaia	Ducati Lenovo Team	Ducati	1:29.180	1:28.955	3
4	43	(Australia) Jack Miller	Prima Pramac Yamaha MotoGP	Yamaha	1:29.186	1:29.090	4
5	79	(Japan) Ai Ogura	Trackhouse MotoGP Team	Aprilia	Qualified to Q2	1:29.134	5
6	21	(Italy) Franco Morbidelli	Pertamina Enduro VR46 Racing Team	Ducati	Qualified to Q2	1:29.171	9 (Note: 3-position grid penalty due to impeding other riders.)
7	37	(Spain) Pedro Acosta	Red Bull KTM Factory Racing	KTM	Qualified to Q2	1:29.320	6
8	25	(Spain) Raúl Fernández	Trackhouse MotoGP Team	Aprilia	Qualified to Q2	1:29.367	7
9	72	(Italy) Marco Bezzecchi	Aprilia Racing	Aprilia	Qualified to Q2	1:29.381	8
10	20	(France) Fabio Quartararo	Monster Energy Yamaha MotoGP Team	Yamaha	Qualified to Q2	1:29.389	10
11	36	(Spain) Joan Mir	Honda HRC Castrol	Honda	Qualified to Q2	1:29.422	11
12	5	(France) Johann Zarco	Castrol Honda LCR	Honda	Qualified to Q2	1:29.609	12
13	49	(Italy) Fabio Di Giannantonio	Pertamina Enduro VR46 Racing Team	Ducati	1:29.237	N/A	13
14	33	(South Africa) Brad Binder	Red Bull KTM Factory Racing	KTM	1:29.468	N/A	14
15	54	(Spain) Fermín Aldeguer	BK8 Gresini Racing MotoGP	Ducati	1:29.484	N/A	15
16	10	(Italy) Luca Marini	Honda HRC Castrol	Honda	1:29.532	N/A	16
17	88	(Portugal) Miguel Oliveira	Prima Pramac Yamaha MotoGP	Yamaha	1:29.587	N/A	17
18	12	(Spain) Maverick Viñales	Red Bull KTM Tech3	KTM	1:29.701	N/A	18
19	42	(Spain) Álex Rins	Monster Energy Yamaha MotoGP Team	Yamaha	1:29.733	N/A	19
20	23	(Italy) Enea Bastianini	Red Bull KTM Tech3	KTM	1:29.916	N/A	20
21	35	(Thailand) Somkiat Chantra	Idemitsu Honda LCR	Honda	1:30.076	N/A	22 (Note: 3-position grid penalty due to impeding other riders.)
22	32	(Italy) Lorenzo Savadori	Aprilia Racing	Aprilia	1:30.630	N/A	21
OFFICIAL MOTOGP QUALIFYING 1 REPORT
OFFICIAL MOTOGP QUALIFYING 2 REPORT
OFFICIAL MOTOGP GRID REPORT

=== Moto2 ===
Fastest session lap

Pos.	No.	Biker	Team	Constructor	Qualifying times		Final grid	Row
Pos.	No.	Biker	Team	Constructor	P1	P2	Final grid	Row
1	18	(Spain) Manuel González	Liqui Moly Dynavolt Intact GP	Kalex	Qualified in Q2	1:34.634	1	1
2	13	(Italy) Celestino Vietti	Team HDR Heidrun	Boscoscuro	1:35.144	1:34.670	2	1
3	44	(Spain) Arón Canet	Fantic Racing LINO SONEGO	Kalex	Qualified in Q2	1:34.839	3	1
4	81	(Australia) Senna Agius	Liqui Moly Dynavolt Intact GP	Kalex	Qualified in Q2	1:34.873	4	2
5	7	(Belgium) Barry Baltus	Fantic Racing LINO SONEGO	Kalex	Qualified in Q2	1:34.885	5	2
6	15	(South Africa) Darryn Binder	ITALJET Gresini Moto2	Kalex	1:34.901	1:34.987	6	2
7	24	(Spain) Marcos Ramírez	OnlyFans American Racing Team	Kalex	Qualified in Q2	1:35.015	7	3
8	96	(United Kingdom) Jake Dixon	ELF Marc VDS Racing Team	Boscoscuro	Qualified in Q2	1:35.030	8	3
9	21	(Spain) Alonso López	Team HDR Heidrun	Boscoscuro	Qualified in Q2	1:35.090	9	3
10	10	(Brazil) Diogo Moreira	Italtrans Racing Team	Kalex	Qualified in Q2	1:35.144	10	4
11	28	(Spain) Izan Guevara	BLU CRU Pramac Yamaha Moto2	Boscoscuro	Qualified in Q2	1:35.156	11	4
12	53	(Turkey) Deniz Öncü	Red Bull KTM Ajo	Kalex	Qualified in Q2	1:35.162	12	4
13	75	(Spain) Albert Arenas	ITALJET Gresini Moto2	Kalex	Qualified in Q2	1:35.297	13	5
14	64	(Indonesia) Mario Aji	Idemitsu Honda Team Asia	Kalex	Qualified in Q2	1:35.311	14	5
15	27	(Spain) Daniel Holgado	CFMOTO Inde Aspar Team	Kalex	1:34.980	1:35.314	15	5
16	12	(Czech Republic) Filip Salač	ELF Marc VDS Racing Team	Boscoscuro	Qualified in Q2	1:35.322	16	6
17	9	(Spain) Jorge Navarro	KLINT Forward Factory Team	Forward	Qualified in Q2	1:35.397	17	6
18	99	(Spain) Adrián Huertas	Italtrans Racing Team	Kalex	1:35.081	1:35.579	18	6
19	4	(Spain) Iván Ortolá	QJMOTOR - FRINSA - MSI	Boscoscuro	1:35.219	N/A	19	7
20	14	(Italy) Tony Arbolino	BLU CRU Pramac Yamaha Moto2	Boscoscuro	1:35.239	N/A	20	7
21	71	(Japan) Ayumu Sasaki	RW - Idrofoglia Racing GP	Kalex	1:35.302	N/A	21	7
22	11	(Spain) Álex Escrig	KLINT Forward Factory Team	Forward	1:35.318	N/A	22	8
23	92	(Japan) Yuki Kunii	Idemitsu Honda Team Asia	Kalex	1:35.349	N/A	23	8
24	95	(Netherlands) Collin Veijer	Red Bull KTM Ajo	Kalex	1:35.405	N/A	24	8
25	80	(Colombia) David Alonso	CFMOTO Inde Aspar Team	Kalex	1:35.441	N/A	25	9
26	84	(Netherlands) Zonta van den Goorbergh	RW - Idrofoglia Racing GP	Kalex	1:35.458	N/A	26	9
27	16	(United States) Joe Roberts	OnlyFans American Racing Team	Kalex	1:35.632	N/A	27	9
28	66	(Spain) Óscar Gutiérrez	QJMOTOR - FRINSA - MSI	Boscoscuro	1:35.702	N/A	28	10
OFFICIAL MOTO2 PRACTICE TIMES REPORT								10

=== Moto3 ===
Fastest session lap

Pos.	No.	Biker	Team	Constructor	Qualifying times		Final grid	Row
Pos.	No.	Biker	Team	Constructor	P1	P2	Final grid	Row
1	82	(Italy) Matteo Bertelle	LEVELUP-MTA	KTM	Qualified in Q2	1:40.400	1	1
2	82	(Italy) Stefano Nepa	SIC58 Squadra Corse	Honda	Qualified in Q2	1:40.482	2	1
3	99	(Spain) José Antonio Rueda	Red Bull KTM Ajo	KTM	Qualified in Q2	1:40.496	3	1
4	19	(United Kingdom) Scott Ogden	CIP Green Power	KTM	Qualified in Q2	1:40.539	4	2
5	58	(Italy) Luca Lunetta	SIC58 Squadra Corse	Honda	Qualified in Q2	1:40.647	5	2
6	83	(Spain) Álvaro Carpe	Red Bull KTM Ajo	KTM	1:40.946	1:40.665	6	2
7	22	(Spain) David Almansa	Leopard Racing	Honda	Qualified in Q2	1:40.734	7	3
8	66	(Australia) Joel Kelso	LEVELUP-MTA	KTM	Qualified in Q2	1:40.739	8	3
9	72	(Japan) Taiyo Furusato	Honda Team Asia	Honda	Qualified in Q2	1:40.758	9	3
10	64	(Spain) David Muñoz	Liqui Moly Dynavolt Intact GP	KTM	Qualified in Q2	1:40.784	10	4
11	31	(Spain) Adrián Fernández	Leopard Racing	Honda	Qualified in Q2	1:40.865	11	4
12	54	(Italy) Riccardo Rossi	Rivacold Snipers Team	Honda	Qualified in Q2	1:40.866	12	4
13	71	(Italy) Dennis Foggia	CFMOTO Gaviota Aspar Team	KTM	1:41.276	1:40.874	13	5
14	6	(Japan) Ryusei Yamanaka	FRINSA - MT Helmets - MSI	KTM	Qualified in Q2	1:40.893	14	5
15	36	(Spain) Ángel Piqueras	FRINSA - MT Helmets - MSI	KTM	Qualified in Q2	1:40.964	15	5
16	10	(Italy) Nicola Carraro	Rivacold Snipers Team	Honda	Qualified in Q2	1:41.249	16	6
17	5	(Thailand) Tatchakorn Buasri	Honda Team Asia	Honda	1:41.233	1:41.526	17	6
18	8	(United Kingdom) Eddie O'Shea	GRYD - Mlav Racing	Honda	1:41.391	1:41.917	18	6
19	21	(South Africa) Ruche Moodley	DENSSI Racing - BOE	KTM	1:41.589	N/A	19	7
20	11	(Spain) Adrián Cruces	CIP Green Power	KTM	1:41.643	N/A	20	7
21	73	(Argentina) Valentín Perrone	Red Bull KTM Tech3	KTM	1:41.715	N/A	21	7
22	14	(New Zealand) Cormac Buchanan	DENSSI Racing - BOE	KTM	1:41.757	N/A	22	8
23	78	(Spain) Joel Esteban	Red Bull KTM Tech3	KTM	1:41.889	N/A	23	8
24	94	(Italy) Guido Pini	Liqui Moly Dynavolt Intact GP	KTM	1:42.329	N/A	24	8
25	34	(Austria) Jakob Rosenthaler	CFMOTO Gaviota Aspar Team	KTM	1:42.367	N/A	25	9
26	89	(Spain) Marcos Uriarte	GRYD - Mlav Racing	Honda	1:42.525	N/A	26	9
PT GRAND PRIX OF Thailand MOTO3 QUALIFYING RESULTS

== Warm Up ==
Pos.	No.	Biker	Constructor	
Pos.	No.	Biker	Constructor	Time results
1	93	(Spain) Marc Márquez	Ducati	1:29.460
2	73	(Spain) Álex Márquez	Ducati	1:29.822
3	63	(Italy) Francesco Bagnaia	Ducati	1:29.885
4	21	(Italy) Franco Morbidelli	Ducati	1:30.001
5	49	(Italy) Fabio Di Giannantonio	Ducati	1:30.103
6	72	(Italy) Marco Bezzecchi	Aprilia	1:30.311
7	25	(Spain) Raúl Fernández	Aprilia	1:30.397
8	20	(France) Fabio Quartararo	Yamaha	1:30.417
9	54	(Spain) Fermín Aldeguer	Ducati	1:30.419
10	43	(Australia) Jack Miller	Yamaha	1:30.449
11	5	(France) Johann Zarco	Honda	1:30.480
12	23	(Italy) Enea Bastianini	KTM	1:30.648
13	79	(Japan) Ai Ogura	Aprilia	1:30.669
14	42	(Spain) Álex Rins	Yamaha	1:30.675
15	10	(Italy) Luca Marini	Honda	1:30.709
16	37	(Spain) Pedro Acosta	KTM	1:30.714
17	88	(Portugal) Miguel Oliveira	Yamaha	1:30.717
18	33	(South Africa) Brad Binder	KTM	1:30.818
19	12	(Spain) Maverick Viñales	KTM	1:31.007
20	35	(Thailand) Somkiat Chantra	Honda	1:31.707
21	36	(Spain) Joan Mir	Honda	1:32.080
22	32	(Italy) Lorenzo Savadori	Aprilia	1:32.325
OFFICIAL MOTOGP WARM UP TIMES REPORT

== MotoGP Sprint ==
The MotoGP Sprint was held on 1 March.

Pos.	No.	Rider	Team	Constructor	Laps	Time/Retired	Grid	Points
1	93	(Spain) Marc Márquez	Ducati Lenovo Team	Ducati	13	19:35.005	1	12
2	73	(Spain) Álex Márquez	BK8 Gresini Racing MotoGP	Ducati	13	+1.185	2	9
3	63	(Italy) Francesco Bagnaia	Ducati Lenovo Team	Ducati	13	+3.423	3	7
4	79	(Japan) Ai Ogura	Trackhouse MotoGP Team	Aprilia	13	+4.392	5	6
5	21	(Italy) Franco Morbidelli	Pertamina Enduro VR46 Racing Team	Ducati	13	+5.790	9	5
6	37	(Spain) Pedro Acosta	Red Bull KTM Factory Racing	KTM	13	+11.700	6	4
7	20	(France) Fabio Quartararo	Monster Energy Yamaha MotoGP Team	Yamaha	13	+13.437	10	3
8	33	(South Africa) Brad Binder	Red Bull KTM Factory Racing	KTM	13	+14.228	14	2
9	36	(Spain) Joan Mir	Honda HRC Castrol	Honda	13	+15.453	11	1
10	5	(France) Johann Zarco	Castrol Honda LCR	Honda	13	+16.209	12	
11	25	(Spain) Raúl Fernández	Trackhouse MotoGP Team	Aprilia	13	+16.817	7	
12	72	(Italy) Marco Bezzecchi	Aprilia Racing	Aprilia	13	+17.152	8	
13	54	(Spain) Fermín Aldeguer	BK8 Gresini Racing MotoGP	Ducati	13	+17.741	15	
14	12	(Spain) Maverick Viñales	Red Bull KTM Tech3	KTM	13	+18.984	18	
15	10	(Italy) Luca Marini	Honda HRC Castrol	Honda	13	+19.149	16	
16	88	(Portugal) Miguel Oliveira	Prima Pramac Yamaha MotoGP	Yamaha	13	+19.569	17	
17	42	(Spain) Álex Rins	Monster Energy Yamaha MotoGP Team	Yamaha	13	+20.140	19	
18	23	(Italy) Enea Bastianini	Red Bull KTM Tech3	KTM	13	+23.948	20	
19	35	(Thailand) Somkiat Chantra	Idemitsu Honda LCR	Honda	13	+24.594	22	
20	32	(Italy) Lorenzo Savadori	Aprilia Racing	Aprilia	13	+31.443	21	
Ret	49	(Italy) Fabio Di Giannantonio	Pertamina Enduro VR46 Racing Team	Ducati	11	Technical problem	13	
Ret	43	(Australia) Jack Miller	Prima Pramac Yamaha MotoGP	Yamaha	6	Accident	4	
Fastest lap: (Spain) Marc Márquez (Ducati) - 1:29.911 (lap 2)
OFFICIAL MOTOGP SPRINT REPORT

== Race ==
=== MotoGP ===
Pos.	No.	Rider	Team	Constructor	Laps	Time/Retired	Grid	Points
1	93	(Spain) Marc Márquez	Ducati Lenovo Team	Ducati	26	39:37.244	1	25
2	73	(Spain) Álex Márquez	BK8 Gresini Racing MotoGP	Ducati	26	+1.732	2	20
3	63	(Italy) Francesco Bagnaia	Ducati Lenovo Team	Ducati	26	+2.398	3	16
4	21	(Italy) Franco Morbidelli	Pertamina Enduro VR46 Racing Team	Ducati	26	+5.176	9	13
5	79	(Japan) Ai Ogura	Trackhouse MotoGP Team	Aprilia	26	+7.450	5	11
6	72	(Italy) Marco Bezzecchi	Aprilia Racing	Aprilia	26	+14.967	8	10
7	5	(France) Johann Zarco	Castrol Honda LCR	Honda	26	+15.225	12	9
8	33	(South Africa) Brad Binder	Red Bull KTM Factory Racing	KTM	26	+19.929	14	8
9	23	(Italy) Enea Bastianini	Red Bull KTM Tech3	KTM	26	+20.053	20	7
10	49	(Italy) Fabio Di Giannantonio	Pertamina Enduro VR46 Racing Team	Ducati	26	+21.546	13	6
11	43	(Australia) Jack Miller	Prima Pramac Yamaha MotoGP	Yamaha	26	+22.315	4	5
12	10	(Italy) Luca Marini	Honda HRC Castrol	Honda	26	+23.940	16	4
13	54	(Spain) Fermín Aldeguer	BK8 Gresini Racing MotoGP	Ducati	26	+24.760	15	3
14	88	(Portugal) Miguel Oliveira	Prima Pramac Yamaha MotoGP	Yamaha	26	+26.097	17	2
15	20	(France) Fabio Quartararo	Monster Energy Yamaha MotoGP Team	Yamaha	26	+26.456	10	1
16	12	(Spain) Maverick Viñales	Red Bull KTM Tech3	KTM	26	+28.770	18	
17	42	(Spain) Álex Rins	Monster Energy Yamaha MotoGP Team	Yamaha	26	+31.095	19	
18	35	(Thailand) Somkiat Chantra	Idemitsu Honda LCR	Honda	26	+31.480	22	
19	37	(Spain) Pedro Acosta	Red Bull KTM Factory Racing	KTM	26	+42.115	6	
20	32	(Italy) Lorenzo Savadori	Aprilia Racing	Aprilia	26	+46.827	21	
Ret	25	(Spain) Raúl Fernández	Trackhouse MotoGP Team	Aprilia	22	Technical issue	7	
Ret	36	(Spain) Joan Mir	Honda HRC Castrol	Honda	14	Accident	11	
Fastest lap: (Spain) Marc Márquez (Ducati) - 1:30.637 (lap 4)
OFFICIAL MOTOGP RACE REPORT

=== Moto2 ===
Pos.	No.	Rider	Team	Constructor	Laps	Time/Retired	Grid	Points
1	18	(Spain) Manuel González	Liqui Moly Dynavolt Intact GP	Kalex	22	35:13.072	1	25
2	44	(Spain) Arón Canet	Fantic Racing Lino Sonego	Kalex	22	+2.600	3	20
3	81	(Australia) Senna Agius	Liqui Moly Dynavolt Intact GP	Kalex	22	+6.491	4	16
4	10	(Brazil) Diogo Moreira	Italtrans Racing Team	Kalex	22	+6.742	10	13
5	24	(Spain) Marcos Ramírez	OnlyFans American Racing Team	Kalex	22	+9.561	7	11
6	7	(Belgium) Barry Baltus	Fantic Racing Lino Sonego	Kalex	22	+11.244	5	10
7	96	(United Kingdom) Jake Dixon	Elf Marc VDS Racing Team	Boscoscuro	22	+11.345	8	9
8	27	(Spain) Daniel Holgado	CFMoto Inde Aspar Team	Kalex	22	+13.174	15	8
9	12	(Czech Republic) Filip Salač	Elf Marc VDS Racing Team	Boscoscuro	22	+14.188	16	7
10	21	(Spain) Alonso López	Team HDR Heidrun	Boscoscuro	22	+14.926	9	6
11	75	(Spain) Albert Arenas	Italjet Gresini Moto2	Kalex	22	+15.757	13	5
12	53	(Turkey) Deniz Öncü	Red Bull KTM Ajo	Kalex	22	+18.820	12	4
13	14	(Italy) Tony Arbolino	Blu Cru Pramac Yamaha Moto2	Boscoscuro	22	+19.152	20	3
14	99	(Spain) Adrián Huertas	Italtrans Racing Team	Kalex	22	+19.999	18	2
15	64	(Indonesia) Mario Aji	Idemitsu Honda Team Asia	Kalex	22	+20.760	14	1
16	28	(Spain) Izan Guevara	Blu Cru Pramac Yamaha Moto2	Boscoscuro	22	+21.256	11	
17	15	(South Africa) Darryn Binder	Italjet Gresini Moto2	Kalex	22	+22.225	6	
18	16	(United States) Joe Roberts	OnlyFans American Racing Team	Kalex	22	+23.264	27	
19	92	(Japan) Yuki Kunii	Idemitsu Honda Team Asia	Kalex	22	+23.408	23	
20	95	(Netherlands) Collin Veijer	Red Bull KTM Ajo	Kalex	22	+24.309	24	
21	80	(Colombia) David Alonso	CFMoto Inde Aspar Team	Kalex	22	+24.642	25	
22	4	(Spain) Iván Ortolá	QJMotor – Frinsa – MSi	Boscoscuro	22	+26.974	19	
23	71	(Japan) Ayumu Sasaki	RW-Idrofoglia Racing GP	Kalex	22	+27.064	21	
24	84	(Netherlands) Zonta van den Goorbergh	RW-Idrofoglia Racing GP	Kalex	22	+30.653	26	
25	66	(Spain) Óscar Gutiérrez	QJMotor – Frinsa – MSi	Boscoscuro	22	+37.405	28	
Ret	13	(Italy) Celestino Vietti	Team HDR Heidrun	Boscoscuro	12	Collision damage	2	
Ret	9	(Spain) Jorge Navarro	Klint Forward Factory Team	Forward	0	Accident	17	
DNS	11	(Spain) Álex Escrig	Klint Forward Factory Team	Forward		Did not start	22	
Fastest lap: (Spain) Manuel González (Kalex) - 1:35.390 (lap 4)
OFFICIAL MOTO2 RACE REPORT

=== Moto3 ===
Pos.	No.	Rider	Team	Constructor	Laps	Time/Retired	Grid	Points
1	99	(Spain) José Antonio Rueda	Red Bull KTM Ajo	KTM	19	32:14.402	3	25
2	83	(Spain) Álvaro Carpe	Red Bull KTM Ajo	KTM	19	+7.276	6	20
3	31	(Spain) Adrián Fernández	Leopard Racing	Honda	19	+7.341	11	16
4	82	(Italy) Stefano Nepa	Sic58 Squadra Corse	Honda	19	+7.590	2	13
5	18	(Italy) Matteo Bertelle	LevelUp – MTA	KTM	19	+10.242	1	11
6	71	(Italy) Dennis Foggia	CFMoto Gaviota Aspar Team	KTM	19	+11.644	13	10
7	22	(Spain) David Almansa	Leopard Racing	Honda	19	+12.068	7	9
8	54	(Italy) Riccardo Rossi	Rivacold Snipers Team	Honda	19	+13.138	12	8
9	78	(Spain) Joel Esteban	Red Bull KTM Tech3	KTM	19	+21.956	23	7
10	58	(Italy) Luca Lunetta	Sic58 Squadra Corse	Honda	19	+22.031	5	6
11	21	(South Africa) Ruché Moodley	Denssi Racing – Boé	KTM	19	+22.158	19	5
12	36	(Spain) Ángel Piqueras	Frinsa – MT Helmets – MSi	KTM	19	+29.798	15	4
13	89	(Spain) Marcos Uriarte	Gryd – MLav Racing	Honda	19	+30.044	26	3
14 (Note: 1-position penalty due to overtaking under yellow flag)	11	(Spain) Adrián Cruces	CIP Green Power	KTM	19	+29.930	20	2
15	14	(New Zealand) Cormac Buchanan	Denssi Racing – Boé	KTM	19	+57.228	22	1
Ret	19	(United Kingdom) Scott Ogden	CIP Green Power	KTM	18	Collision	4	
Ret	34	(Austria) Jakob Rosenthaler	CFMoto Gaviota Aspar Team	KTM	18	Collision	25	
Ret	66	(Australia) Joel Kelso	LevelUp – MTA	KTM	14	Accident	8	
Ret	64	(Spain) David Muñoz	Liqui Moly Dynavolt Intact GP	KTM	12	Accident	10	
Ret	10	(Italy) Nicola Carraro	Rivacold Snipers Team	Honda	10	Accident	16	
Ret	6	(Japan) Ryusei Yamanaka	Frinsa – MT Helmets – MSi	KTM	9	Accident	14	
Ret	94	(Italy) Guido Pini	Liqui Moly Dynavolt Intact GP	KTM	8	Accident	24	
Ret	72	(Japan) Taiyo Furusato	Honda Team Asia	Honda	7	Accident	9	
Ret	73	(Argentina) Valentín Perrone	Red Bull KTM Tech3	KTM	6	Accident	21	
Ret	5	(Thailand) Tatchakorn Buasri	Honda Team Asia	Honda	6	Accident	17	
Ret	8	(United Kingdom) Eddie O'Shea	Gryd – MLav Racing	Honda	0	Accident	18	
Fastest lap: (Spain) David Muñoz (KTM) - 1:41.042 (lap 9)
OFFICIAL MOTO3 RACE REPORT

== Championship standings after the race ==
Below are the standings for the top five riders, constructors, and teams after the round.

=== MotoGP ===
Riders' Championship standings

Pos.	Rider	Points
1	(Spain) Marc Márquez	37
2	(Spain) Álex Márquez	29
3	(Italy) Francesco Bagnaia	23
4	(Italy) Franco Morbidelli	18
5	(Japan) Ai Ogura	17

Constructors' Championship standings

Pos.	Constructor	Points
1	(Italy) Ducati	37
2	(Italy) Aprilia	17
3	(Austria) KTM	12
4	(Japan) Honda	10
5	(Japan) Yamaha	8

Teams' Championship standings

Pos.	Team	Points
1	(Italy) Ducati Lenovo Team	60
2	(Italy) BK8 Gresini Racing MotoGP	32
3	(Italy) Pertamina Enduro VR46 Racing Team	24
4	(United States) Trackhouse MotoGP Team	17
5	(Austria) Red Bull KTM Factory Racing	14

=== Moto2 ===
Riders' Championship standings

Pos.	Rider	Points
1	(Spain) Manuel González	25
2	(Spain) Arón Canet	20
3	(Australia) Senna Agius	16
4	(Brazil) Diogo Moreira	13
5	(Spain) Marcos Ramírez	11

Constructors' Championship standings

Pos.	Constructor	Points
1	(Germany) Kalex	25
2	(Italy) Boscoscuro	9

Teams' Championship standings

Pos.	Team	Points
1	(Germany) Liqui Moly Dynavolt Intact GP	41
2	(Italy) Fantic Racing Lino Sonego	30
3	(Belgium) Elf Marc VDS Racing Team	16
4	(Italy) Italtrans Racing Team	15
5	(United States) OnlyFans American Racing Team	11

=== Moto3 ===
Riders' Championship standings

Pos.	Rider	Points
1	(Spain) José Antonio Rueda	25
2	(Spain) Álvaro Carpe	20
3	(Spain) Adrián Fernández	16
4	(Italy) Stefano Nepa	13
5	(Italy) Matteo Bertelle	11

Constructors' Championship standings

Pos.	Constructor	Points
1	(Austria) KTM	25
2	(Japan) Honda	16

Teams' Championship standings

Pos.	Team	Points
1	(Finland) Red Bull KTM Ajo	45
2	(Luxembourg) Leopard Racing	25
3	(Italy) Sic58 Squadra Corse	19
4	(Italy) LevelUp – MTA	11
5	(Spain) CFMoto Gaviota Aspar Team	10

== Notes ==
Previous race: 2024 Solidarity Grand Prix	FIM Grand Prix World Championship; 2025 season	Next race: 2025 Argentine Grand Prix
Previous race: 2024 Thailand Grand Prix	Thailand motorcycle Grand Prix	Next race: 2026 Thailand Grand Prix
