= David Almansa =

Spanish motorcycle racer (born 2006)

- Almansa at the 2026 San Marino Grand Prix
- Nationality: Spanish
- Born: 22 January 2006 (age 20); Puertollano, Ciudad Real, Spain
- Current team: Liqui Moly Dynavolt Intact GP
- Bike number: 22
Motorcycle racing career statistics
Moto3 World Championship
Active years	2022–2026
Manufacturers	KTM (2022, 2026); CFMoto (2023); Husqvarna (2023); Honda (2023–2025)
2025 championship position	10th (134 pts)
Starts / Wins / Podiums / Poles / F. laps / Points; 62 / 4 / 10 / 10 / 4 / 418

David García Almansa (born 22 January 2006) is a Spanish Grand Prix motorcycle racer who competes for Liqui Moly Dynavolt Intact GP aboard a KTM in the Moto3 World Championship in 2026.

== Career ==
=== Early career ===
Almansa started racing in Spain early, winning his first championship by the age of 13. Later on, he raced in the Spanish Cuna de Campeones Moto5 championship, finishing as runner-up in 2018 before winning the title in 2019.

In 2021, Almansa moved to the European Talent Cup, winning in his first weekend and finishing 11th in the championship, despite missing two races. For 2022, Almansa moved up again, this time going to the FIM JuniorGP World Championship. In his first season in the category, he finished eighth, winning in the season finale. In 2023, for his second season in the category, he won another race, but dropped to ninth in the championship after missing the final two races.

=== Moto3 World Championship ===
==== Boé Motorsports (2022) ====
Almansa made his debut in the Moto3 World Championship at the last round of 2022, as a wildcard for Boé Motorsports. He qualified 22nd and finished 25th, in a field of 32 bikes.

==== CFMoto Racing Prüstel GP (2023) ====
Following an injury sustained by regular rider Joel Kelso, Almansa was called up to replace him for the Argentinian and Americas rounds of the 2023 Moto3 World Championship at CFMoto Racing Prüstel GP. He would end up finishing 17th in both of his starts for the team.

==== Finetwork Intact GP (2023) ====
Almansa made wild card appearances in the three Spanish rounds in the 2023 season for Finetwork Intact GP, although he would end up withdrawing from the season finale in Valencia after Free Practice One due to an injury. In his two starts, he had a best result of 20th, coming in his first one at Jerez.

==== Rivacold Snipers Team (2023-2024) ====
Due to an injury sustained by Romano Fenati, Almansa was called up to race for the Rivacold Snipers Team, racing for his fourth manufacturer in six starts, (Note: Almansa raced for KTM, Husqvarna, CFMoto and Honda. Even though the Husqvarna and CFMoto are simply rebadged KTM's, they were classified as different constructors.) at the Japanese Grand Prix. He would finish 17th.

Almansa would join the team full time for the 2024 Moto3 World Championship, as he attempted to make his first full season. He would miss the first three races and end up finishing 22nd, scoring 18 points with a best finish of 11th, which he achieved at the San Marino and Malaysian rounds of the season.

==== Leopard Racing (2025) ====
Almansa moved to the Leopard Racing team for 2025, where he found much better results than in 2024. He scored his first top-ten in Moto3 at the Buriram opener, adding more through the season. Almansa scored his first pole position at Barcelona, scoring a second one at Sepang. In the same race, he also earned his best finish of third, after the disqualification of his teammate.

==== Dynavolt Intact GP (2026) ====
Almansa at the 2026 Czech Grand Prix

On October 5, 2025, it was announced Almansa would switch to Dynavolt Intact GP for the 2026 season. In his first start with the team at Buriram, Almansa won his first world championship race. In the Catalaonia round, Almansa scored his first fastest lap in Moto3. Almansa then scored back to back pole positions for the first time in his Grand Prix career, scoring three in a row at the Italian, Hungarian and Czech rounds of the season. He had to miss the Italian Grand Prix due to Tonsillitis developing overnight. In Hungary, he was able to score his second podium of the season, taking second place. In Brno, he finished fourth, being involved in the battle for the win. At the Dutch TT, he would score his third podium of the season, finishing second after being beaten in a duel by Máximo Quiles. This result ensured Almansa returned to the top-three in the championship for the first time since winning in Thailand. At the following round in Germany, Almansa was forced to withdraw following the second free practice session due to a case of influenza. In the British round at Silverstone, Almansa earned his second win of the season, and of his career. This result allowed him to retake third in the championship, which he had lost following his failure to start in Germany. In Aragon, another pole position was converted into a second place finish, once again behind Quiles. The same result was repeated at the San Marino Grand Prix. This result saw him move into second in the world championship. Another pole position came at the Japanese Grand Prix, but this time he was able to defeat Quiles in a battle for the win. Almansa finished second again in Indonesia, consolidating his place in second in the championship, but Quiles winning meant Almansa could no longer win the world championship. Almansa won a fourth round of Moto3 in Qatar, bringing him to the brink of securing second in the world championship. 4th in Portugal from pole sealed P2 in the world championship.

=== Moto2 World Championship ===
==== Dynavolt Intact GP (2027) ====
On September 20, 2026, it was announced Almansa would be promoted by Dynavolt Intact GP to Moto2 for the 2027 season.

== Career statistics ==
=== European Talent Cup ===
(key) (Races in bold indicate pole position, races in italics indicate fastest lap)

Year	1	2	3	4	5	6	7	8	9	10	11	12	Pos	Pts
2021	EST; 16	EST; 1	VAL; 7	VAL; Ret	BAR; Ret	ALG; 9	ARA; 12	ARA; C	JER	JER	VAL; Ret	VAL; 5	11th	56

=== FIM JuniorGP World Championship ===
(key) (Races in bold indicate pole position, races in italics indicate fastest lap)

Year	1	2	3	4	5	6	7	8	9	10	11	12	Pos	Pts
2022	EST; Ret	VAL; Ret	VAL; 10	BAR; 9	BAR; 5	JER; 11	JER; 2	ALG; 5	SMR; DNS	ARA; 17	VAL; Ret	VAL; 1	8th	85
2023	EST; Ret	VAL; Ret	VAL; Ret	JER; Ret	JER; 1	ALG; 4	ALG; 3	BAR; 22	BAR; 2	ARA; Ret	VAL	VAL	9th	74

=== Grand Prix motorcycle racing ===
==== By season ====
Season	Class	Motorcycle	Team	Race	Win	Podium	Pole	FLap	Pts	Plcd
2022	Moto3	KTM	Finetwork Team Boé Motorsports	1	0	0	0	0	0	41st
2023	Moto3	CFMoto	CFMoto Racing Prüstel GP	2	0	0	0	0	0	32nd
2023	Moto3	Husqvarna	Finetwork Intact GP	2	0	0	0	0	0	32nd
2023	Moto3	Honda	Rivacold Snipers Team	1	0	0	0	0	0	32nd
2024	Moto3	Honda	Rivacold Snipers Team	17	0	0	0	0	18	22nd
2025	Moto3	Honda	Leopard Racing	22	0	1	2	0	134	10th
2026	Moto3	KTM	Liqui Moly Dynavolt Intact GP	17	4	9	8	4	266*	**2nd***
Total				**62**	**4**	**10**	**10**	**4**	**418**	

==== By class ====
Class	Seasons	1st GP	1st Pod	1st Win	Race	Win	Podiums	Pole	FLap	Pts	WChmp
Moto3	2022–present	2022 Valencia	2025 Malaysia	2026 Thailand	62	4	10	10	4	418	0
Total	2022–present				**62**	**4**	**10**	**10**	**4**	**418**	**0**

==== Races by year ====
(key) (Races in bold indicate pole position, races in italics indicate fastest lap)

Year	Class	Bike	1	2	3	4	5	6	7	8	9	10	11	12	13	14	15	16	17	18	19	20	21	22	Pos	Pts
2022	Moto3	KTM	QAT	INA	ARG	AME	POR	SPA	FRA	ITA	CAT	GER	NED	GBR	AUT	RSM	ARA	JPN	THA	AUS	MAL	VAL; 25			41st	0
2023	Moto3	CFMoto	POR	ARG; 17	AME; 17																				32nd	0
2023	Moto3	Husqvarna				SPA; 20	FRA	ITA	GER	NED	GBR	AUT	CAT; 22	RSM	IND							VAL; WD			32nd	0
2023	Moto3	Honda														JPN; 17	INA	AUS	THA	MAL	QAT				32nd	0
2024	Moto3	Honda	QAT; DNS	POR	AME; DNS	SPA; 15	FRA; 15	CAT; Ret	ITA; 21	NED; Ret	GER; 20	GBR; 18	AUT; 20	ARA; 18	RSM; 11	EMI; 17	INA; Ret	JPN; 12	AUS; Ret	THA; 20	MAL; 11	SLD; 14			22nd	18
2025	Moto3	Honda	THA; 7	ARG; 6	AME; 13	QAT; 16	SPA; Ret	FRA; 5	GBR; 6	ARA; 4	ITA; Ret	NED; 6	GER; Ret	CZE; 7	AUT; 12	HUN; 7	**CAT**; 4	RSM; 14	JPN; Ret	INA; Ret	AUS; 9	**MAL**; 3	POR; 21	VAL; 8	10th	134
2026	Moto3	KTM	**THA**; 1	BRA; Ret	USA	SPA; 8	FRA; 8	CAT; 4	**ITA**; DNS	**HUN**; 2	**CZE**; 4	NED; 2	GER; DNS	GBR; 1	**ARA**; 2	**RSM**; 2	AUT; Ret	**JPN**; 1	INA; 2	AUS; C	MAL; 5	QAT; 1	**POR**; 4	VAL	2nd*	266*

* Season still in progress.
