= Iván Ortolá =

Spanish motorcycle racer (born 2004)

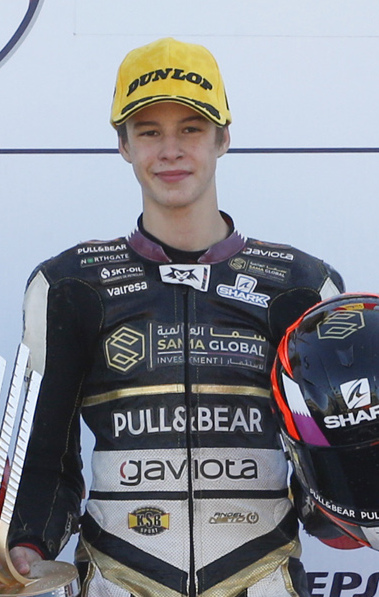
- Ortolá in 2019
- Nationality: Spanish
- Born: 4 August 2004 (age 22); Calicanto, Valencia, Spain
- Current team: QJMotor – MSi
- Bike number: 4
Motorcycle racing career statistics
Moto2 World Championship
Active years	2025
Manufacturers	Boscoscuro, Kalex
2025 championship position	16th (88 pts)
Starts / Wins / Podiums / Poles / F. laps / Points; 41 / 2 / 6 / 1 / 5 / 307.5
Moto3 World Championship
Active years	2022–2024
Manufacturers	KTM
Championships	0
2024 championship position	4th (226 pts)
Starts / Wins / Podiums / Poles / F. laps / Points; 60 / 4 / 10 / 6 / 4 / 484

Iván Ortolá Díez (born 4 August 2004) is a Spanish Grand Prix motorcycle racer competing in the 2026 Moto2 World Championship for QJMotor – MSi. He was the 2017 Spanish 85cc Champion.

== Career statistics ==
=== European Talent Cup ===
==== Races by year ====
(key) (Races in bold indicate pole position; races in italics indicate fastest lap)

Year	Bike	1	2	3	4	5	6	7	8	9	10	11	Pts	Pos
2019	Honda	EST; 1	EST; 1	VAL; 12	VAL	CAT; 4	ARA; 5	ARA; 7	JER; 7	JER; 8	ALB; 6	VAL; 1	2nd	128
2020	Honda	EST; 2	EST; 9	ALG; 6	JER; 4	JER; 7	JER; 3	ARA; 4	ARA; 3	ARA; 3	VAL	VAL; 3	4th	136

=== Red Bull MotoGP Rookies Cup ===
==== Races by year ====
(key) (Races in bold indicate pole position, races in italics indicate fastest lap)

Year	1	2	3	4	5	6	7	8	9	10	11	12	13	14	Pos	Pts
2020	RBR1; Ret	RBR2; 6	RBR3; 5	RBR4; 2	ARA1; 3	ARA2; 3	ARA3; 1	ARA4; 3	VAL1; Ret	VAL2; 6	VAL3; 2	VAL4; 10			3rd	150
2021	POR1; 6	POR2; 6	SPA1; 2	SPA2; Ret	MUG1; 10	MUG2; 3	GER1; 5	GER2; Ret	RBR1; 2	RBR2; 4	RBR3; 6	RBR4; 3	ARA1; Ret	ARA2; 1	4th	157

=== FIM CEV Moto3 Junior World Championship ===
==== Races by year ====
(key) (Races in bold indicate pole position, races in italics indicate fastest lap)

Year	Bike	1	2	3	4	5	6	7	8	9	10	11	12	Pos	Pts
2021	KTM	**EST**; 8	VAL1; 6	VAL2; 3	CAT1; 10	CAT2; 2	POR; 12	ARA; 4	**JER1**; 3	**JER2**; 2	RSM; 2	VAL3; 3	VAL4; 2	2nd	169

=== Grand Prix motorcycle racing ===
==== By season ====
Season	Class	Motorcycle	Team	Race	Win	Podium	Pole	FLap	Pts	Plcd
2022	Moto3	KTM	Angeluss MTA Team	20	0	0	0	0	73	17th
2023	Moto3	KTM	Angeluss MTA Team	20	2	3	0	3	187	6th
2024	Moto3	KTM	MT Helmets – MSi	20	2	7	6	1	224	4th
2025	Moto2	Boscoscuro	QJMotor – Frinsa – MSi	22	0	1	0	1	88	16th
2026	Moto2	Kalex	QJMotor – MSi	19	2	5	1	4	219.5*	**3rd***
Total				**101**	**6**	**16**	**7**	**9**	**791.5**	

==== By class ====
Class	Seasons	1st GP	1st pod	1st win	Race	Win	Podiums	Pole	FLap	Pts	WChmp
Moto3	2022–2024	2022 Qatar	2023 Americas	2023 Americas	60	4	10	6	4	484	0
Moto2	2025–present	2025 Thailand	2025 Valencia	2026 Czech Republic	41	2	6	1	5	307.5	0
Total	2022–present				**101**	**6**	**16**	**7**	**9**	**791.5**	**0**

==== Races by year ====
(key) (Races in bold indicate pole position; races in italics indicate fastest lap)

Year	Class	Bike	1	2	3	4	5	6	7	8	9	10	11	12	13	14	15	16	17	18	19	20	21	22	Pos	Pts
2022	Moto3	KTM	QAT; 11	INA; Ret	ARG; 15	AME; 11	POR; Ret	SPA; 13	FRA; 18	ITA; 7	CAT; 18	GER; 10	NED; 12	GBR; Ret	AUT; 11	RSM; 8	ARA; 6	JPN; 13	THA; 20	AUS; 13	MAL; 9	VAL; 12			17th	73
2023	Moto3	KTM	POR; Ret	ARG; 19	AME; 1	SPA; 1	FRA; 4	ITA; 11	GER; 4	NED; 4	GBR; 4	AUT; 5	CAT; DSQ	RSM; 8	IND; 8	JPN; 5	INA; 9	AUS; Ret	THA; 11	MAL; 4	QAT; 15	VAL; 3			6th	187
2024	Moto3	KTM	QAT; 9	POR; 3	AME; Ret	SPA; 3	FRA; 5	**CAT**; 2	ITA; 6	NED; 1	GER; 3	**GBR**; 1	**AUT**; 9	ARA; 12	RSM; 3	EMI; 5	**INA**; 9	**JPN**; 16	**AUS**; Ret	THA; 4	MAL; 4	SLD; 9			4th	224
2025	Moto2	Boscoscuro	THA; 22	ARG; 19	AME; 6	QAT; 18	SPA; 18	FRA; 9	GBR; Ret	ARA; 14	ITA; 16	NED; Ret	GER; 13	CZE; 12	AUT; 6	HUN; 10	CAT; 11	RSM; 13	JPN; 8	INA; 7	AUS; 18	MAL; 13	POR; 14	VAL; 3	16th	88
2026	Moto2	Kalex	THA; 4^{‡}	BRA; 10	USA; 11	SPA; 10	FRA; 3	CAT; 4	ITA; Ret	HUN; Ret	CZE; 1	NED; 5	**GER**; 1	GBR; 2	ARA; 5	RSM; 4	AUT; 5	JPN; 4	INA; 6	AUS; C	MAL; 8	QAT; 2	POR	VAL	3rd*	219.5*

^{‡} Half points awarded as less than half of the race distance (but at least three full laps) was completed.
* Season still in progress.
