= 2026 German motorcycle Grand Prix =

Motorcycle races in Hohenstein-Ernstthal

(Germany) 2026 German Grand Prix
Race details
- Race 11 of 22 races in the 2026 Grand Prix motorcycle racing season
- Date: 12 July 2026
- Official name: Liqui Moly Grand Prix of Germany
- Location: Sachsenring; Hohenstein-Ernstthal, Germany
- Course: Permanent racing facility; 3.671 km (2.281 mi)

MotoGP
Pole position
Rider	(Spain) Marc Márquez	Ducati
Time	1:19.041	
Fastest lap
Rider	(Spain) Marc Márquez	Ducati
Time	1:21.088 on lap 3	
Podium
First	(Spain) Marc Márquez	Ducati
Second	(Japan) Ai Ogura	Aprilia
Third	(Spain) Raúl Fernández	Aprilia

Moto2
Pole position
Rider	(Spain) Iván Ortolá	Kalex
Time	1:21.493	
Fastest lap
Rider	(Spain) Daniel Holgado	Kalex
Time	1:22.248 on lap 2	
Podium
First	(Spain) Iván Ortolá	Kalex
Second	(Spain) Daniel Holgado	Kalex
Third	(Spain) Izan Guevara	Boscoscuro

Moto3
Pole position
Rider	(Spain) Brian Uriarte	KTM
Time	1:24.880	
Fastest lap
Rider	(Spain) Máximo Quiles	KTM
Time	1:25.227 on lap 3	
Podium
First	(Spain) Brian Uriarte	KTM
Second	(Spain) Máximo Quiles	KTM
Third	(Italy) Matteo Bertelle	KTM

The 2026 German motorcycle Grand Prix (officially known as the Liqui Moly Grand Prix of Germany) was the eleventh round of the 2026 Grand Prix motorcycle racing season. All races were held at the Sachsenring in Hohenstein-Ernstthal on 12 July 2026.

== Practice session ==
=== Moto3 ===
==== Practice ====
The top 14 riders (written in bold) qualified for Q2.

Fastest session lap

Pos.	No.	Rider	Team	Constructor	
Pos.	No.	Rider	Team	Constructor	Time results
1	9	(Indonesia) **Veda Pratama**	**Honda Team Asia**	**Honda**	**1:25.848**
2	78	(Spain) **Joel Esteban**	**LevelUp – MTA**	**KTM**	1:25.856
3	8	(United Kingdom) **Eddie O'Shea**	**Gryd Racing**	**Honda**	1:25.883
4	54	(Spain) **Jesús Ríos**	**Rivacold Snipers Team**	**Honda**	1:25.904
5	83	**(Spain) Álvaro Carpe**	**Red Bull KTM Ajo**	**KTM**	1:25.967
6	97	(Argentina) **Marco Morelli**	**CFMoto Gaviota Aspar Team**	**KTM**	1:25.973
7	13	(Malaysia) **Hakim Danish**	**Aeon Credit – MT Helmets – MSi**	**KTM**	1:25.975
8	14	(New Zealand) **Cormac Buchanan**	**Code Motorsport**	**KTM**	1:26.014
9	18	(Italy) **Matteo Bertelle**	**LevelUp – MTA**	**KTM**	1:26.063
10	6	(Japan) **Ryusei Yamanaka**	**Aeon Credit – MT Helmets – MSi**	**KTM**	1:26.105
11	51	(Spain) **Brian Uriarte**	**Red Bull KTM Ajo**	**KTM**	1:26.110
12	19	(United Kingdom) **Scott Ogden**	**CIP Green Power**	**KTM**	1:26.131
13	66	(United Kingdom) **Joel Kelso**	**Gryd Racing**	**Honda**	1:26.140
14	27	(Finland) **Rico Salmela**	**Red Bull KTM Tech3**	**KTM**	1:26.220
15	64	(Republic of Ireland) Casey O'Gorman	Sic58 Squadra Corse	Honda	1:26.254
16	88	(Spain) Marcos Uriarte	Liqui Moly Dynavolt Intact GP	KTM	1:26.256
17	31	(Italy) Adrián Fernández	Leopard Racing	Honda	1:26.266
18	73	(Argentina) Valentín Perrone	Red Bull KTM Tech3	KTM	1:26.272
19	11	(Spain) Adrián Cruces	CIP Green Power	KTM	1:26.314
20	10	(Italy) Nicola Carraro	Rivacold Snipers Team	Honda	1:26.625
21	94	(Italy) Guido Pini	Leopard Racing	Honda	1:26.754
22	5	(Austria) Leo Rammerstorfer	Sic58 Squadra Corse	Honda	1:27.164
23	41	(Spain) Eduardo Gutiérrez	Code Motorsports	KTM	1:29.052
NC	28	(Spain) Máximo Quiles	CFMoto Gaviota Aspar Team	KTM	No time set
NC	22	(Spain) David Almansa	Liqui Moly Dynavolt Intact GP	KTM	Illness
Official Moto3 Practice Times Report

== Qualifying ==
=== MotoGP ===
Fastest session lap

Pos.	No.	Rider	Team	Constructor	Q1	Q2	Final grid	Row
1	93	(Spain) Marc Márquez	Ducati Lenovo Team	Ducati	Qualified to Q2	1:19.041	1	1
2	73	(Spain) Álex Márquez	BK8 Gresini Racing MotoGP	Ducati	Qualified to Q2	1:19.102	2	1
3	49	(Italy) Fabio Di Giannantonio	Pertamina Enduro VR46 Racing Team	Ducati	Qualified to Q2	1:19.188	3	1
4	25	(Spain) Raúl Fernández	SuperFile Trackhouse MotoGP Team	Aprilia	Qualified to Q2	1:19.192	4	2
5	79	(Japan) Ai Ogura	SuperFile Trackhouse MotoGP Team	Aprilia	Qualified to Q2	1:19.348	5	2
6	20	(France) Fabio Quartararo	Monster Energy Yamaha MotoGP Team	Yamaha	1:19.864	1:19.383	6	2
7	21	(Italy) Franco Morbidelli	Pertamina Enduro VR46 Racing Team	Ducati	Qualified to Q2	1:19.532	10 (Note: 3-place grid penalty on Sunday race due to riding slow on the racing line during Qualifying Practice.)	4
8	72	(Italy) Marco Bezzecchi	Aprilia Racing	Aprilia	Qualified to Q2	1:19.613	7	3
9	89	(Spain) Jorge Martín	Aprilia Racing	Aprilia	Qualified to Q2	1:19.728	8	3
10	37	(Spain) Pedro Acosta	Red Bull KTM Factory Racing	KTM	Qualified to Q2	1:19.740	9	3
11	63	(Italy) Francesco Bagnaia	Ducati Lenovo Team	Ducati	1:19.753	1:19.753	11	4
12	43	(Australia) Jack Miller	Prima Pramac Yamaha MotoGP	Yamaha	Qualified to Q2	1:19.781	12	4
13	36	(Spain) Joan Mir	Honda HRC Castrol	Honda	1:19.988	N/A	13	5
14	10	(Italy) Luca Marini	Honda HRC Castrol	Honda	1:19.998	N/A	14	5
15	11	(Brazil) Diogo Moreira	Pro Honda LCR	Honda	1:20.084	N/A	18	6
16	33	(South Africa) Brad Binder	Red Bull KTM Factory Racing	KTM	1:20.184	N/A	15	5
17	23	(Italy) Enea Bastianini	Red Bull KTM Tech3	KTM	1:20.370	N/A	16	6
18	7	(Turkey) Toprak Razgatlıoğlu	Prima Pramac Yamaha MotoGP	Yamaha	1:20.585	N/A	17	6
19	42	(Spain) Álex Rins	Monster Energy Yamaha MotoGP Team	Yamaha	1:20.600	N/A	19	7
20	12	(Spain) Maverick Viñales	Red Bull KTM Tech3	KTM	1:20.781	N/A	20	7
21	35	(United Kingdom) Cal Crutchlow	Castrol Honda LCR	Honda	1:20.953	N/A	21	7
Official MotoGP Qualifying 1 Report
Official MotoGP Qualifying 2 Report
Official MotoGP Grid Report

== MotoGP Sprint ==
The MotoGP Sprint was held on 11 July 2026.

Pos.	No.	Rider	Team	Manufacturer	Laps	Time/Retired	Grid	Points
1	93	(Spain) Marc Márquez	Ducati Lenovo Team	Ducati	15	20:12.978	1	12
2	73	(Spain) Álex Márquez	BK8 Gresini Racing MotoGP	Ducati	15	+0.368	2	9
3	49	(Italy) Fabio Di Giannantonio	Pertamina Enduro VR46 Racing Team	Ducati	15	+0.813	3	7
4	79	(Japan) Ai Ogura	SuperFile Trackhouse MotoGP Team	Aprilia	15	+3.019	5	6
5	25	(Spain) Raúl Fernández	SuperFile Trackhouse MotoGP Team	Aprilia	15	+5.454	4	5
6	89	(Spain) Jorge Martín	Aprilia Racing	Aprilia	15	+6.155	9	4
7	63	(Italy) Francesco Bagnaia	Ducati Lenovo Team	Ducati	15	+7.751	11	3
8	37	(Spain) Pedro Acosta	Red Bull KTM Factory Racing	KTM	15	+8.968	10	2
9	20	(France) Fabio Quartararo	Monster Energy Yamaha MotoGP Team	Yamaha	15	+10.855	6	1
10	11	(Brazil) Diogo Moreira	Pro Honda LCR	Honda	15	+13.279	15	
11	10	(Italy) Luca Marini	Honda HRC Castrol	Honda	15	+13.406	14	
12	33	(South Africa) Brad Binder	Red Bull KTM Factory Racing	KTM	15	+14.111	16	
13	43	(Australia) Jack Miller	Prima Pramac Yamaha MotoGP	Yamaha	15	+15.007	12	
14	23	(Italy) Enea Bastianini	Red Bull KTM Tech3	KTM	15	+15.398	17	
15	36	(Spain) Joan Mir	Honda HRC Castrol	Honda	15	+17.977	13	
16	42	(Spain) Álex Rins	Monster Energy Yamaha MotoGP Team	Yamaha	15	+18.137	19	
17	7	(Turkey) Toprak Razgatlıoğlu	Prima Pramac Yamaha MotoGP	Yamaha	15	+22.622	18	
18	35	(United Kingdom) Cal Crutchlow	Castrol Honda LCR	Honda	15	+22.929	21	
19	12	(Spain) Maverick Viñales	Red Bull KTM Tech3	KTM	15	+31.185	20	
Ret	21	(Italy) Franco Morbidelli	Pertamina Enduro VR46 Racing Team	Ducati	5	Accident	7	
DNS	72	(Italy) Marco Bezzecchi	Aprilia Racing	Aprilia		Injury		
Fastest sprint lap: (Italy) Fabio Di Giannantonio (Ducati) - 1:20.119 (lap 2)
Official MotoGP Sprint Report

== Race ==
=== MotoGP ===
Pos.	No.	Rider	Team	Manufacturer	Laps	Time/Retired	Grid	Points
1	93	(Spain) Marc Márquez	Ducati Lenovo Team	Ducati	30	40:53.148	1	25
2	79	(Japan) Ai Ogura	SuperFile Trackhouse MotoGP Team	Aprilia	30	+1.996	5	20
3	25	(Spain) Raúl Fernández	SuperFile Trackhouse MotoGP Team	Aprilia	30	+5.104	4	16
4	37	(Spain) Pedro Acosta	Red Bull KTM Factory Racing	KTM	30	+7.684	8	13
5	89	(Spain) Jorge Martín	Aprilia Racing	Aprilia	30	+11.372	7	11
6	63	(Italy) Francesco Bagnaia	Ducati Lenovo Team	Ducati	30	+11.495	9	10
7	20	(France) Fabio Quartararo	Monster Energy Yamaha MotoGP Team	Yamaha	30	+17.560	6	9
8	10	(Italy) Luca Marini	Honda HRC Castrol	Honda	30	+18.683	13	8
9	23	(Italy) Enea Bastianini	Red Bull KTM Tech3	KTM	30	+19.140	15	7
10	33	(South Africa) Brad Binder	Red Bull KTM Factory Racing	KTM	30	+22.137	14	6
11	11	(Brazil) Diogo Moreira	Pro Honda LCR	Honda	30	+22.280	18	5
12	43	(Australia) Jack Miller	Prima Pramac Yamaha MotoGP	Yamaha	30	+26.154	11	4
13	21	(Italy) Franco Morbidelli	Pertamina Enduro VR46 Racing Team	Ducati	30	+30.910	10	3
14	42	(Spain) Álex Rins	Monster Energy Yamaha MotoGP Team	Yamaha	30	+31.511	17	2
15	7	(Turkey) Toprak Razgatlıoğlu	Prima Pramac Yamaha MotoGP	Yamaha	30	+38.122	16	1
Ret	12	(Spain) Maverick Viñales	Red Bull KTM Tech3	KTM	26	Technical	19	
Ret	35	(United Kingdom) Cal Crutchlow	Castrol Honda LCR	Honda	21	Accident	20	
Ret	73	(Spain) Álex Márquez	BK8 Gresini Racing MotoGP	Ducati	8	Accident	2	
Ret	36	(Spain) Joan Mir	Honda HRC Castrol	Honda	6	Accident	12	
Ret	49	(Italy) Fabio Di Giannantonio	Pertamina Enduro VR46 Racing Team	Ducati	3	Accident	3	
DNS	72	(Italy) Marco Bezzecchi	Aprilia Racing	Aprilia		Injury		
Fastest lap: (Spain) Marc Márquez (Ducati) – 1:21.088 (lap 3)
Official MotoGP Race Report

=== Moto2 ===
Pos.	No.	Rider	Team	Manufacturer	Laps	Time/Retired	Grid	Points
1	4	(Spain) Iván Ortolá	QJMotor – R.O.M.E.A. – MSi	Kalex	25	35:00.119	1	25
2	96	(Spain) Daniel Holgado	CFMoto Azul Marino Aspar Team	Kalex	25	+0.614	4	20
3	28	(Spain) Izan Guevara	Blu Cru Pramac Yamaha Moto2	Boscoscuro	25	+3.229	3	16
4	81	(Australia) Senna Agius	Liqui Moly Dynavolt Intact GP	Kalex	25	+7.430	5	13
5	72	(Japan) Taiyo Furusato	Honda Team Asia	Kalex	25	+7.489	7	11
6	18	(Spain) Manuel González	Liqui Moly Dynavolt Intact GP	Kalex	25	+9.460	2	10
7	12	(Czech Republic) Filip Salač	OnlyFans American Racing Team	Kalex	25	+9.725	15	9
8	98	(Spain) José Antonio Rueda	Red Bull KTM Ajo	Kalex	25	+10.205	11	8
9	95	(Netherlands) Collin Veijer	Red Bull KTM Ajo	Kalex	25	+11.237	9	7
10	32	(Italy) Luca Lunetta	MB Conveyors SpeedRS Team	Boscoscuro	25	+12.741	12	6
11	99	(Spain) Adrián Huertas	Italtrans Racing Team	Kalex	25	+13.246	20	5
12	16	(United States) Joe Roberts	OnlyFans American Racing Team	Kalex	25	+14.290	13	4
13	71	(Japan) Ayumu Sasaki	Momoven Idrofoglia RW Racing Team	Kalex	25	+14.525	19	3
14	36	(Spain) Ángel Piqueras	QJMotor – R.O.M.E.A. – MSi	Kalex	25	+21.335	23	2
15	11	(Spain) Álex Escrig	Klint Racing Team	Forward	25	+21.783	6	1
16	14	(Italy) Tony Arbolino	Reds Fantic Racing	Kalex	25	+22.186	16	
17	53	(Turkey) Deniz Öncü	Elf Marc VDS Racing Team	Boscoscuro	25	+22.252	14	
18	9	(Spain) Jorge Navarro	Reds Fantic Racing	Kalex	25	+24.577	26	
19	85	(Spain) Xabi Zurutuza	Klint Racing Team	Forward	25	+24.719	25	
20	84	(Netherlands) Zonta van den Goorbergh	Momoven Idrofoglia RW Racing Team	Kalex	25	+25.371	24	
21	3	(Spain) Sergio García	Italjet Gresini Moto2	Kalex	25	+27.938	18	
22	54	(Spain) Alberto Ferrández	Blu Cru Pramac Yamaha Moto2	Boscoscuro	25	+28.080	17	
23	40	(Poland) Milan Pawelec	Italjet Gresini Moto2	Kalex	25	+48.793	27	
NC (Note: Not classified for not completing 75% of the race distance.)	64	(Indonesia) Mario Aji	Honda Team Asia	Kalex	16	+9 laps	10	
Ret	44	(Spain) Arón Canet	Elf Marc VDS Racing Team	Boscoscuro	19	Accident damage	21	
Ret	80	(Colombia) David Alonso	CFMoto Azul Marino Aspar Team	Kalex	17	Accident	8	
Ret	13	(Italy) Celestino Vietti	MB Conveyors SpeedRS Team	Boscoscuro	15	Accident	22	
Fastest lap: (Spain) Daniel Holgado (Kalex) – 1:22.248 (lap 2)
Official Moto2 Race Report

=== Moto3 ===
Pos.	No.	Rider	Team	Manufacturer	Laps	Time/Retired	Grid	Points
1	51	(Spain) Brian Uriarte	Red Bull KTM Ajo	KTM	23	33:02.694	1	25
2	28	(Spain) Máximo Quiles	CFMoto Gaviota Aspar Team	KTM	23	+0.063	4	20
3	18	(Italy) Matteo Bertelle	LevelUp – MTA	KTM	23	+5.053	7	16
4	97	(Argentina) Marco Morelli	CFMoto Gaviota Aspar Team	KTM	23	+5.060	2	13
5	27	(Finland) Rico Salmela	Red Bull KTM Tech3	KTM	23	+5.139	6	11
6	31	(Spain) Adrián Fernández	Leopard Racing	Honda	23	+8.626	10	10
7	54	(Spain) Jesús Ríos	Rivacold Snipers Team	Honda	23	+11.418	8	9
8	9	(Indonesia) Veda Pratama	Honda Team Asia	Honda	23	+15.657	13	8
9	6	(Japan) Ryusei Yamanaka	Aeon Credit – MT Helmets – MSi	KTM	23	+15.774	9	7
10	8	(United Kingdom) Eddie O'Shea	Gryd Racing	Honda	23	+15.789	16	6
11	83	(Spain) Álvaro Carpe	Red Bull KTM Ajo	KTM	23	+15.928	5	5
12	13	(Malaysia) Hakim Danish	Aeon Credit – MT Helmets – MSi	KTM	23	+16.593	3	4
13	14	(New Zealand) Cormac Buchanan	Code Motorsports	KTM	23	+25.522	11	3
14	66	(Australia) Joel Kelso	Gryd Racing	Honda	23	+30.087	12	2
15	94	(Italy) Guido Pini	Leopard Racing	Honda	23	+33.849	22	1
16	5	(Austria) Leo Rammerstorfer	Sic58 Squadra Corse	Honda	23	+33.935	21	
17	19	(United Kingdom) Scott Ogden	CIP Green Power	KTM	23	+47.311	18	
18	88	(Spain) Marcos Uriarte	Liqui Moly Dynavolt Intact GP	KTM	23	+1:17.492	20	
19	10	(Italy) Nicola Carraro	Rivacold Snipers Team	Honda	23	+1:17.647	24	
20	41	(Spain) Eduardo Gutiérrez	Code Motorsports	KTM	23	+1:23.681	23	
Ret	67	(Republic of Ireland) Casey O'Gorman	Sic58 Squadra Corse	Honda	8	Accident damage	14	
Ret	78	(Spain) Joel Esteban	LevelUp – MTA	KTM	7	Accident	15	
Ret	11	(Spain) Adrián Cruces	CIP Green Power	KTM	7	Accident	17	
Ret	73	(Argentina) Valentín Perrone	Red Bull KTM Tech3	KTM	1	Collision	19	
DNS	22	(Spain) David Almansa	Liqui Moly Dynavolt Intact GP	KTM		Illness		
Fastest lap: (Spain) Máximo Quiles (KTM) – 1:25.227 (lap 3)
Official Moto3 Race Report

== Championship standings after the race ==
Below are the standings for the top five riders, constructors, and teams after the round.

=== MotoGP ===
Riders' Championship standings

	Pos.	Rider	Points
	1	(Spain) Jorge Martín	208
2	2	(Japan) Ai Ogura	194
2	3	(Spain) Marc Márquez	190
2	4	(Italy) Marco Bezzecchi	186
2	5	(Italy) Fabio Di Giannantonio	184

Constructors' Championship standings

Pos.	Constructor	Points
1	(Italy) Aprilia	330
2	(Italy) Ducati	319
3	(Austria) KTM	190
4	(Japan) Honda	109
5	(Japan) Yamaha	69

Teams' Championship standings

Pos.	Team	Points
1	(Italy) Aprilia Racing	394
2	(United States) SuperFile Trackhouse MotoGP Team	353
3	(Italy) Ducati Lenovo Team	333
4	(Italy) Pertamina Enduro VR46 Racing Team	230
5	(Austria) Red Bull KTM Factory Racing	212

=== Moto2 ===
Riders' Championship standings

	Pos.	Rider	Points
	1	(Spain) Manuel González	195.5
	2	(Spain) Izan Guevara	144
	3	(Australia) Senna Agius	136
	4	(Colombia) David Alonso	116
1	5	(Spain) Daniel Holgado	115

Constructors' Championship standings

Pos.	Constructor	Points
1	(Germany) Kalex	257.5
2	(Italy) Boscoscuro	165
3	(Switzerland) Forward	34

Teams' Championship standings

	Pos.	Team	Points
	1	(Germany) Liqui Moly Dynavolt Intact GP	331.5
	2	(Spain) CFMoto Azul Marino Aspar Team	231
	3	(Italy) Blu Cru Pramac Yamaha Moto2	158.5
	4	(Italy) MB Conveyors SpeedRS Team	126
1	5	(Spain) QJMotor – R.O.M.E.A. – MSi	117.5

=== Moto3 ===
Riders' Championship standings

	Pos.	Rider	Points
	1	(Spain) Máximo Quiles	231
2	2	(Spain) Brian Uriarte	127
1	3	(Spain) Álvaro Carpe	126
1	4	(Argentina) Marco Morelli	115
2	5	(Spain) David Almansa	109

Constructors' Championship standings

Pos.	Constructor	Points
1	(Austria) KTM	270
2	(Japan) Honda	141

Teams' Championship standings

Pos.	Team	Points
1	(Spain) CFMoto Gaviota Aspar Team	346
2	(Finland) Red Bull KTM Ajo	253
3	(Germany) Liqui Moly Dynavolt Intact GP	167
4	(France) Red Bull KTM Tech3	130
5	(Spain) Aeon Credit – MT Helmets – MSi	108

== Notes ==
Previous race: 2026 Dutch TT	FIM Grand Prix World Championship; 2026 season	Next race: 2026 British Grand Prix
Previous race: 2025 German Grand Prix	German motorcycle Grand Prix	Next race: 2027 German Grand Prix
