= 2026 Thailand motorcycle Grand Prix =

Motorcycle races in Buriram

2026 Thailand Grand Prix
Race details
- Race 1 of 22 races in the 2026 Grand Prix motorcycle racing season
- Date: 1 March 2026
- Official name: PT Grand Prix of Thailand
- Location: Chang International Circuit; Buriram, Thailand
- Course: Permanent racing facility; 4.554 km (2.830 mi)

MotoGP
Pole position
Rider	(Italy) Marco Bezzecchi	Aprilia
Time	1:28.652	
Fastest lap
Rider	(Italy) Marco Bezzecchi	Aprilia
Time	1:30.487 on lap 5	
Podium
First	(Italy) Marco Bezzecchi	Aprilia
Second	(Spain) Pedro Acosta	KTM
Third	(Spain) Raúl Fernández	Aprilia

Moto2
Pole position
Rider	(Australia) Senna Agius	Kalex
Time	1:34.576	
Fastest lap
Rider	(Spain) Manuel González	Kalex
Time	1:35.379 on lap 2	
Podium
First	(Spain) Manuel González	Kalex
Second	(Spain) Izan Guevara	Boscoscuro
Third	(Spain) Daniel Holgado	Kalex

Moto3
Pole position
Rider	(Spain) David Almansa	KTM
Time	1:40.088	
Fastest lap
Rider	(Argentina) Valentín Perrone	KTM
Time	1:41.228 on lap 3	
Podium
First	(Spain) David Almansa	KTM
Second	(Spain) Máximo Quiles	KTM
Third	(Argentina) Valentín Perrone	KTM

The 2026 Thailand motorcycle Grand Prix (officially known as the PT Grand Prix of Thailand) was the first round of the 2026 Grand Prix motorcycle racing season. All races were held at the Chang International Circuit in Buriram on 1 March 2026.

== Qualifying ==
=== MotoGP ===
Fastest session lap

Pos.	No.	Rider	Team	Constructor	Q1	Q2	Final grid	Row
1	72	(Italy) Marco Bezzecchi	Aprilia Racing	Aprilia	Qualified to Q2	1:28.652	1	1
2	93	(Spain) Marc Márquez	Ducati Lenovo Team	Ducati	Qualified to Q2	1:28.687	2	1
3	25	(Spain) Raúl Fernández	Trackhouse MotoGP Team	Aprilia	1:28.784	1:28.876	3	1
4	49	(Italy) Fabio Di Giannantonio	Pertamina Enduro VR46 Racing Team	Ducati	Qualified to Q2	1:28.918	4	2
5	89	(Spain) Jorge Martín	Aprilia Racing	Aprilia	Qualified to Q2	1:29.001	5	2
6	37	(Spain) Pedro Acosta	Red Bull KTM Factory Team	KTM	Qualified to Q2	1:29.061	6	2
7	73	(Spain) Álex Márquez	BK8 Gresini Racing MotoGP	Ducati	Qualified to Q2	1:29.077	7	3
8	79	(Japan) Ai Ogura	Trackhouse MotoGP Team	Aprilia	Qualified to Q2	1:29.211	8	3
9	21	(Italy) Franco Morbidelli	Pertamina Enduro VR46 Racing Team	Ducati	1:29.090	1:29.321	9	3
10	36	(Spain) Joan Mir	Honda HRC Castrol	Honda	Qualified to Q2	1:29.385	10	4
11	33	(South Africa) Brad Binder	Red Bull KTM Factory Team	KTM	Qualified to Q2	1:29.402	11	4
12	5	(France) Johann Zarco	Castrol Honda LCR	Honda	Qualified to Q2	1:29.532	12	4
13	63	(Italy) Francesco Bagnaia	Ducati Lenovo Team	Ducati	1:29.348	N/A	13	5
14	10	(Italy) Luca Marini	Honda HRC Castrol	Honda	1:29.446	N/A	14	5
15	11	(Brazil) Diogo Moreira	Pro Honda LCR	Honda	1:29.489	N/A	15	5
16	20	(France) Fabio Quartararo	Monster Energy Yamaha MotoGP Team	Yamaha	1:29.683	N/A	16	6
17	12	(Spain) Maverick Viñales	Red Bull KTM Tech3	KTM	1:29.774	N/A	17	6
18	43	(Australia) Jack Miller	Prima Pramac Yamaha MotoGP	Yamaha	1:29.834	N/A	18	6
19	42	(Spain) Álex Rins	Monster Energy Yamaha MotoGP Team	Yamaha	1:30.067	N/A	19	7
20	23	(Italy) Enea Bastianini	Red Bull KTM Tech3	KTM	1:30.078	N/A	20	7
21	7	(Turkey) Toprak Razgatlıoğlu	Prima Pramac Yamaha MotoGP	Yamaha	1:30.165	N/A	21	7
22	51	(Italy) Michele Pirro	BK8 Gresini Racing MotoGP	Ducati	1:31.361	N/A	22 (Note: 3-position grid penalty due to impeding other riders. Final grid position not affected.)	8
Official MotoGP Qualifying 1 Report
Official MotoGP Qualifying 2 Report
Official MotoGP Grid Report

=== Moto2 ===
Fastest session lap

Pos.	No.	Rider	Team	Constructor	Q1	Q2	Final grid	Row
1	81	(Australia) Senna Agius	Liqui Moly Dynavolt Intact GP	Kalex	Qualified to Q2	1:34.576	1	1
2	28	(Spain) Izan Guevara	Blu Cru Pramac Yamaha Moto2	Boscoscuro	Qualified to Q2	1:34.604	2	1
3	96	(Spain) Daniel Holgado	CFMoto Inde Aspar Team	Kalex	Qualified to Q2	1:34.625	3	1
4	4	(Spain) Iván Ortolá	QJMotor – Pont Grup – MSi	Kalex	Qualified to Q2	1:34.693	4	2
5	13	(Italy) Celestino Vietti	Sync Group SpeedRS Team	Boscoscuro	Qualified to Q2	1:34.746	5	2
6	95	(Netherlands) Collin Veijer	Red Bull KTM Ajo	Kalex	Qualified to Q2	1:34.788	6	2
7	18	(Spain) Manuel González	Liqui Moly Dynavolt Intact GP	Kalex	Qualified to Q2	1:34.796	7	3
8	12	(Czech Republic) Filip Salač	OnlyFans American Racing Team	Kalex	Qualified to Q2	1:34.830	8	3
9	64	(Indonesia) Mario Aji	Idemitsu Honda Team Asia	Kalex	Qualified to Q2	1:34.835	9	3
10	80	(Colombia) David Alonso	CFMoto Inde Aspar Team	Kalex	1:35.141	1:34.860	10	4
11	36	(Spain) Ángel Piqueras	QJMotor – Pont Grup – MSi	Kalex	Qualified to Q2	1:35.007	11	4
12	71	(Japan) Ayumu Sasaki	Momoven Idrofoglia RW Racing Team	Kalex	Qualified to Q2	1:35.040	12	4
13	7	(Belgium) Barry Baltus	Reds Fantic Racing	Kalex	Qualified to Q2	1:35.181	13	5
14	17	(Spain) Daniel Muñoz	Italtrans Racing Team	Kalex	1:34.896	1:35.191	14	5
15	44	(Spain) Arón Canet	Elf Marc VDS Racing Team	Boscoscuro	1:35.120	1:35.200	15	5
16	3	(Spain) Sergio García	Italjet Gresini Moto2	Kalex	Qualified to Q2	1:35.544	16	6
17	53	(Turkey) Deniz Öncü	Elf Marc VDS Racing Team	Boscoscuro	1:35.013	1:35.888	17	6
18	11	(Spain) Álex Escrig	Klint Racing Team	Forward	Qualified to Q2	No time set	18	6
19	21	(Spain) Alonso López	Italjet Gresini Moto2	Kalex	1:35.170	N/A	19	7
20	32	(Italy) Luca Lunetta	Sync Group SpeedRS Team	Boscoscuro	1:35.188	N/A	20	7
21	14	(Italy) Tony Arbolino	Reds Fantic Racing	Kalex	1:35.189	N/A	21	7
22	72	(Japan) Taiyo Furusato	Idemitsu Honda Team Asia	Kalex	1:35.256	N/A	22	8
23	84	(Netherlands) Zonta van den Goorbergh	Momoven Idrofoglia RW Racing Team	Kalex	1:35.315	N/A	23	8
24	98	(Spain) José Antonio Rueda	Red Bull KTM Ajo	Kalex	1:35.453	N/A	24	8
25	16	(United States) Joe Roberts	OnlyFans American Racing Team	Kalex	1:35.505	N/A	25	9
26	54	(Spain) Alberto Ferrández	Blu Cru Pramac Yamaha Moto2	Boscoscuro	1:35.549	N/A	26	9
27	9	(Spain) Jorge Navarro	Klint Racing Team	Forward	1:35.644	N/A	27	9
Official Moto2 Qualifying 1 Report
Official Moto2 Qualifying 2 Report
Official Moto2 Grid Report

=== Moto3 ===
Fastest session lap

Pos.	No.	Rider	Team	Constructor	Q1	Q2	Final grid	Row
1	22	(Spain) David Almansa	Liqui Moly Dynavolt Intact GP	KTM	Qualified to Q2	1:40.088	1	1
2	83	(Spain) Álvaro Carpe	Red Bull KTM Ajo	KTM	Qualified to Q2	1:40.518	2	1
3	31	(Spain) Adrián Fernandéz	Leopard Racing	Honda	Qualified to Q2	1:40.693	3	1
4	28	(Spain) Máximo Quiles	CFMoto Gaviota Aspar Team	KTM	Qualified to Q2	1:40.697	4	2
5	9	(Indonesia) Veda Pratama	Honda Team Asia	Honda	Qualified to Q2	1:40.877	5	2
6	64	(Spain) David Muñoz	Liqui Moly Dynavolt Intact GP	KTM	1:41.565	1:41.091	6	2
7	6	(Japan) Ryusei Yamanaka	Aeon Credit – MT Helmets – MSi	KTM	Qualified to Q2	1:41.198	7	3
8	19	(United Kingdom) Scott Ogden	CIP Green Power	KTM	Qualified to Q2	1:41.291	8	3
9	94	(Italy) Guido Pini	Leopard Racing	Honda	Qualified to Q2	1:41.319	9	3
10	67	(Republic of Ireland) Casey O'Gorman	Sic58 Squadra Corse	Honda	Qualified to Q2	1:41.337	10	4
11	97	(Argentina) Marco Morelli	CFMoto Gaviota Aspar Team	KTM	Qualified to Q2	1:41.363	11	4
12	51	(Spain) Brian Uriarte	Red Bull KTM Ajo	KTM	Qualified to Q2	1:41.426	12	4
13	27	(Finland) Rico Salmela	Red Bull KTM Tech3	KTM	1:41.822	1:41.694	13	5
14	73	(Argentina) Valentín Perrone	Red Bull KTM Tech3	KTM	Qualified to Q2	1:41.752	14	5
15	13	(Malaysia) Hakim Danish	Aeon Credit – MT Helmets – MSi	KTM	1:41.476	1:41.761	15	5
16	66	(Australia) Joel Kelso	Gryd – MLav Racing	Honda	1:41.800	1:41.788	16	6
17	54	(Spain) Jesús Ríos	Rivacold Snipers Team	Honda	Qualified to Q2	1:41.794	17	6
18	78	(Spain) Joel Esteban	LevelUp – MTA	KTM	Qualified to Q2	1:41.903	18	6
19	14	(New Zealand) Cormac Buchanan	Code Motorsports	KTM	1:41.839	N/A	19	7
20	8	(United Kingdom) Eddie O'Shea	Gryd – MLav Racing	Honda	1:41.856	N/A	20	7
21	18	(Italy) Matteo Bertelle	LevelUp – MTA	KTM	1:41.902	N/A	21	7
22	11	(Spain) Adrián Cruces	CIP Green Power	KTM	1:42.026	N/A	22	8
23	5	(Austria) Leo Rammerstorfer	Sic58 Squadra Corse	Honda	1:42.230	N/A	23	8
24	10	(Italy) Nicola Carraro	Rivacold Snipers Team	Honda	1:42.327	N/A	24	8
25	21	(South Africa) Ruché Moodley	Code Motorsports	KTM	1:42.429	N/A	25	9
26	32	(Japan) Zen Mitani	Honda Team Asia	Honda	1:42.648	N/A	26	9
Official Moto3 Qualifying 1 Report
Official Moto3 Qualifying 2 Report
Official Moto3 Grid Report

== MotoGP Sprint ==
The MotoGP Sprint was held on 28 February 2026.

Pos.	No.	Rider	Team	Manufacturer	Laps	Time/Retired	Grid	Points
1	37	(Spain) Pedro Acosta	Red Bull KTM Factory Racing	KTM	13	19:39.155	6	12
2	93	(Spain) Marc Márquez	Ducati Lenovo Team	Ducati	13	+0.108	2	9
3	25	(Spain) Raúl Fernández	Trackhouse MotoGP Team	Aprilia	13	+0.540	3	7
4	79	(Japan) Ai Ogura	Trackhouse MotoGP Team	Aprilia	13	+2.100	8	6
5	89	(Spain) Jorge Martín	Aprilia Racing	Aprilia	13	+3.851	5	5
6	33	(South Africa) Brad Binder	Red Bull KTM Factory Racing	KTM	13	+4.612	11	4
7	36	(Spain) Joan Mir	Honda HRC Castrol	Honda	13	+4.924	10	3
8	49	(Italy) Fabio Di Giannantonio	Pertamina Enduro VR46 Racing Team	Ducati	13	+5.748	4	2
9	63	(Italy) Francesco Bagnaia	Ducati Lenovo Team	Ducati	13	+6.910	13	1
10	10	(Italy) Luca Marini	Honda HRC Castrol	Honda	13	+7.796	14	
11	73	(Spain) Álex Márquez	BK8 Gresini Racing MotoGP	Ducati	13	+8.504	7	
12	5	(France) Johann Zarco	Castrol Honda LCR	Honda	13	+8.577	12	
13	11	(Brazil) Diogo Moreira	Pro Honda LCR	Honda	13	+11.970	15	
14	21	(Italy) Franco Morbidelli	Pertamina Enduro VR46 Racing Team	Ducati	13	+12.395	9	
15	43	(Australia) Jack Miller	Prima Pramac Yamaha MotoGP	Yamaha	13	+13.467	18	
16	20	(France) Fabio Quartararo	Monster Energy Yamaha MotoGP Team	Yamaha	13	+15.079	16	
17	23	(Italy) Enea Bastianini	Red Bull KTM Tech3	KTM	13	+15.452	20	
18	42	(Spain) Álex Rins	Monster Energy Yamaha MotoGP Team	Yamaha	13	+15.876	19	
19	12	(Spain) Maverick Viñales	Red Bull KTM Tech3	KTM	13	+21.445	17	
20	7	(Turkey) Toprak Razgatlıoğlu	Prima Pramac Yamaha MotoGP	Yamaha	13	+25.860	21	
21	51	(Italy) Michele Pirro	BK8 Gresini Racing MotoGP	Ducati	13	+27.892	22	
Ret	72	(Italy) Marco Bezzecchi	Aprilia Racing	Aprilia	1	Crashed out	1	
Fastest sprint lap: (Spain) Marc Márquez (Ducati) – 1:29.922 (lap 4)
Official MotoGP Sprint Report

== Race ==
=== MotoGP ===
Pos.	No.	Rider	Team	Manufacturer	Laps	Time/Retired	Grid	Points
1	72	(Italy) Marco Bezzecchi	Aprilia Racing	Aprilia	26	39:36.270	1	25
2	37	(Spain) Pedro Acosta	Red Bull KTM Factory Racing	KTM	26	+5.543	6	20
3	25	(Spain) Raúl Fernández	Trackhouse MotoGP Team	Aprilia	26	+9.259	3	16
4	89	(Spain) Jorge Martín	Aprilia Racing	Aprilia	26	+12.182	5	13
5	79	(Japan) Ai Ogura	Trackhouse MotoGP Team	Aprilia	26	+12.411	8	11
6	49	(Italy) Fabio Di Giannantonio	Pertamina Enduro VR46 Racing Team	Ducati	26	+16.845	4	10
7	33	(South Africa) Brad Binder	Red Bull KTM Factory Racing	KTM	26	+17.363	11	9
8	21	(Italy) Franco Morbidelli	Pertamina Enduro VR46 Racing Team	Ducati	26	+18.227	9	8
9	63	(Italy) Francesco Bagnaia	Ducati Lenovo Team	Ducati	26	+18.340	13	7
10	10	(Italy) Luca Marini	Honda HRC Castrol	Honda	26	+19.101	14	6
11	5	(France) Johann Zarco	Castrol Honda LCR	Honda	26	+19.903	12	5
12	23	(Italy) Enea Bastianini	Red Bull KTM Tech3	KTM	26	+23.386	20	4
13	11	(Brazil) Diogo Moreira	Pro Honda LCR	Honda	26	+24.686	15	3
14	20	(France) Fabio Quartararo	Monster Energy Yamaha MotoGP Team	Yamaha	26	+30.823	16	2
15	42	(Spain) Álex Rins	Monster Energy Yamaha MotoGP Team	Yamaha	26	+32.955	19	1
16	12	(Spain) Maverick Viñales	Red Bull KTM Tech3	KTM	26	+36.545	17	
17	7	(Turkey) Toprak Razgatlıoğlu	Prima Pramac Yamaha MotoGP	Yamaha	26	+39.194	21	
18	43	(Australia) Jack Miller	Prima Pramac Yamaha MotoGP	Yamaha	26	+47.848	18	
19	51	(Italy) Michele Pirro	BK8 Gresini Racing MotoGP	Ducati	26	+1:03.598	22	
Ret	36	(Spain) Joan Mir	Honda HRC Castrol	Honda	23	Retired in pits	10	
Ret	73	(Spain) Álex Márquez	BK8 Gresini Racing MotoGP	Ducati	21	Accident	7	
Ret	93	(Spain) Marc Márquez	Ducati Lenovo Team	Ducati	20	Technical issue	2	
Fastest lap: (Italy) Marco Bezzecchi (Aprilia) – 1:30.487 (lap 5)
Official MotoGP Race Report

=== Moto2 ===
The race was scheduled to be run for 22 laps, but was red-flagged after 3 full laps due to a multi-rider crash involving Senna Agius, David Alonso, and Filip Salač at turn 9. The first restart was scheduled for 11 laps, but was also red-flagged after a full lap was completed due to a crash involving Sergio García and Luca Lunetta at turn 3. For the second restart, the race was scheduled for 7 laps and was completed without another red flag.

Initially, the results were issued with full championship points because 11 (Note: 3 from race 1, 1 from race 2, 7 from race 3) total laps were completed, which is above the threshold for full championship points (i.e. must complete at least 50% of the original race distance). However, on 6 March 2026, FIM announced that the results of the Moto2 race would award half points as only 10 full laps were officially completed, less than 50% of the original distance. Per the regulations, the single completed lap from race 2 should have been considered null and void and should not have been added to the total laps completed because 3 full laps was not completed in race 2. FIM has said that the race control software, that normally issues a prompt that 50% of the original race distance has not been completed, erroneously added the single completed lap from part 2 to the results, leading to the initial full-points classification.

Pos.	No.	Rider	Team	Constructor	Laps	Time/Retired	Grid	Points
1	18	(Spain) Manuel González	Liqui Moly Dynavolt Intact GP	Kalex	7	11:11.575	7	12.5
2	28	(Spain) Izan Guevara	Blu Cru Pramac Yamaha Moto2	Boscoscuro	7	+0.099	2	10
3	96	(Spain) Daniel Holgado	CFMoto Inde Aspar Team	Kalex	7	+0.454	3	8
4	4	(Spain) Iván Ortolá	QJMotor – Pont Grup – MSi	Kalex	7	+1.138	4	6.5
5	95	(Netherlands) Collin Veijer	Red Bull KTM Ajo	Kalex	7	+2.667	6	5.5
6	13	(Italy) Celestino Vietti	Sync Group SpeedRS Team	Boscoscuro	7	+3.211	5	5
7	21	(Spain) Alonso López	Italjet Gresini Moto2	Kalex	7	+4.220	19	4.5
8	17	(Spain) Daniel Muñoz	Italtrans Racing Team	Kalex	7	+4.340	14	4
9	53	(Turkey) Deniz Öncü	Elf Marc VDS Racing Team	Boscoscuro	7	+5.835	17	3.5
10	71	(Japan) Ayumu Sasaki	Momoven Idrofoglia RW Racing Team	Kalex	7	+6.180	12	3
11	44	(Spain) Arón Canet	Elf Marc VDS Racing Team	Boscoscuro	7	+6.550	15	2.5
12	11	(Spain) Álex Escrig	Klint Racing Team	Forward	7	+6.788	18	2
13	14	(Italy) Tony Arbolino	Reds Fantic Racing	Kalex	7	+7.103	21	1.5
14	7	(Belgium) Barry Baltus	Reds Fantic Racing	Kalex	7	+9.740	13	1
15	54	(Spain) Alberto Ferrández	Blu Cru Pramac Yamaha Moto2	Boscoscuro	7	+9.776	26	0.5
16	72	(Japan) Taiyo Furusato	Idemitsu Honda Team Asia	Kalex	7	+10.378	22	
17	9	(Spain) Jorge Navarro	Klint Racing Team	Forward	7	+12.326	27	
18	81	(Australia) Senna Agius	Liqui Moly Dynavolt Intact GP	Kalex	7	+12.601	1	
19	12	(Czech Republic) Filip Salač	OnlyFans American Racing Team	Kalex	7	+17.958	8	
Ret	84	(Netherlands) Zonta van den Goorbergh	Momoven Idrofoglia RW Racing Team	Kalex	1	Accident damage	23	
Ret	98	(Spain) José Antonio Rueda	Red Bull KTM Ajo	Kalex	0	Accident	24	
Ret	16	(United States) Joe Roberts	OnlyFans American Racing Team	Kalex	0	Accident	25	
Ret	3	(Spain) Sergio García	Italjet Gresini Moto2	Kalex	0	Did not restart	16	
Ret	32	(Italy) Luca Lunetta	Sync Group SpeedRS Team	Boscoscuro	0	Did not restart	20	
Ret	80	(Colombia) David Alonso	CFMoto Inde Aspar Team	Kalex	0	Did not restart	10	
Ret	64	(Indonesia) Mario Aji	Idemitsu Honda Team Asia	Kalex	0	Did not restart	9	
Ret	36	(Spain) Ángel Piqueras	QJMotor – Pont Grup – MSi	Kalex	0	Did not restart	11	
DNS	99	(Spain) Adrián Huertas	Italtrans Racing Team	Kalex		Did not start		
Fastest lap: (Spain) Manuel González (Kalex) – 1:35.379 (lap 2)
Official Moto2 Race Report

=== Moto3 ===
Pos.	No.	Rider	Team	Constructor	Laps	Time/Retired	Grid	Points
1	22	(Spain) David Almansa	Liqui Moly Dynavolt Intact GP	KTM	19	32:14.186	1	25
2	28	(Spain) Máximo Quiles	CFMoto Gaviota Aspar Team	KTM	19	+0.003	4	20
3	73	(Argentina) Valentín Perrone	Red Bull KTM Tech3	KTM	19	+9.480	14	16
4	83	(Spain) Álvaro Carpe	Red Bull KTM Ajo	KTM	19	+9.573	2	13
5	9	(Indonesia) Veda Pratama	Honda Team Asia	Honda	19	+9.687	5	11
6	31	(Spain) Adrián Fernandéz (Note: Originally finished sixth but was disqualified from the first six races of the season for engine tampering. However, his team Leopard Racing appealed the disqualification and won the appeal verdict, thus reinstating his results in the first six races.)	Leopard Racing	Honda	19	+9.723	3	10
7	51	(Spain) Brian Uriarte	Red Bull KTM Ajo	KTM	19	+11.068	12	9
8	97	(Argentina) Marco Morelli	CFMoto Gaviota Aspar Team	KTM	19	+11.334	11	8
9	78	(Spain) Joel Esteban	LevelUp – MTA	KTM	19	+11.541	18	7
10	64	(Spain) David Muñoz	Liqui Moly Dynavolt Intact GP	KTM	19	+11.657	6	6
11	67	(Republic of Ireland) Casey O'Gorman	Sic58 Squadra Corse	Honda	19	+11.863	10	5
12	19	(United Kingdom) Scott Ogden	CIP Green Power	KTM	19	+13.732	8	4
13	11	(Spain) Adrián Cruces	CIP Green Power	KTM	19	+16.365	22	3
14	66	(Australia) Joel Kelso	Gryd – MLav Racing	Honda	19	+17.264	16	2
15	8	(United Kingdom) Eddie O'Shea	Gryd – MLav Racing	Honda	19	+17.459	20	1
16	5	(Austria) Leo Rammerstorfer	Sic58 Squadra Corse	Honda	19	+25.668	23	
17	54	(Spain) Jesús Ríos	Rivacold Snipers Team	Honda	19	+25.731	17	
18	13	(Malaysia) Hakim Danish	Aeon Credit – MT Helmets – MSi	KTM	19	+25.810	15	
19	27	(Finland) Rico Salmela	Red Bull KTM Tech3	KTM	19	+25.898	13	
20	94	(Italy) Guido Pini	Leopard Racing	Honda	19	+36.323	9	
21	21	(South Africa) Ruché Moodley	Code Motorsports	KTM	19	+36.854	25	
22	32	(Japan) Zen Mitani	Honda Team Asia	Honda	19	+37.978	26	
23	10	(Italy) Nicola Carraro	Rivacold Snipers Team	Honda	19	+54.641	24	
24	6	(Japan) Ryusei Yamanaka	Aeon Credit – MT Helmets – MSi	KTM	18	+1 lap	7	
Ret	18	(Italy) Matteo Bertelle	LevelUp – MTA	KTM	18	Accident damage	21	
Ret	14	(New Zealand) Cormac Buchanan	Code Motorsports	KTM	2	Accident	19	
Fastest lap: (Argentina) Valentín Perrone (KTM) – 1:41.228 (lap 3)
Official Moto3 Race Report

== Championship standings after the race ==
Below are the standings for the top five riders, constructors, and teams after the round.

=== MotoGP ===
Riders' Championship standings

Pos.	Rider	Points
1	(Spain) Pedro Acosta	32
2	(Italy) Marco Bezzecchi	25
3	(Spain) Raúl Fernández	23
4	(Spain) Jorge Martín	18
5	(Japan) Ai Ogura	17

Constructors' Championship standings

Pos.	Constructor	Points
1	(Italy) Aprilia	32
2	(Austria) KTM	32
3	(Italy) Ducati	19
4	(Japan) Honda	9
5	(Japan) Yamaha	2

Teams' Championship standings

Pos.	Team	Points
1	(Austria) Red Bull KTM Factory Racing	45
2	(Italy) Aprilia Racing	43
3	(United States) Trackhouse MotoGP Team	40
4	(Italy) Pertamina Enduro VR46 Racing Team	20
5	(Italy) Ducati Lenovo Team	17

=== Moto2 ===
Riders' Championship standings

Pos.	Rider	Points
1	(Spain) Manuel González	12.5
2	(Spain) Izan Guevara	10
3	(Spain) Daniel Holgado	8
4	(Spain) Iván Ortolá	6.5
5	(Netherlands) Collin Veijer	5.5

Constructors' Championship standings

Pos.	Constructor	Points
1	(Germany) Kalex	12.5
2	(Italy) Boscoscuro	10
3	(Switzerland) Forward	2

Teams' Championship standings

Pos.	Team	Points
1	(Germany) Liqui Moly Dynavolt Intact GP	12.5
2	(Italy) Blu Cru Pramac Yamaha Moto2	10.5
3	(Spain) CFMoto Inde Aspar Team	8
4	(Spain) QJMotor – Pont Grup – MSi	6.5
5	(Belgium) Elf Marc VDS Racing Team	6

=== Moto3 ===
Riders' Championship standings

Pos.	Rider	Points
1	(Spain) David Almansa	25
2	(Spain) Máximo Quiles	20
3	(Argentina) Valentín Perrone	16
4	(Spain) Álvaro Carpe	13
5	(Indonesia) Veda Pratama	11

Constructors' Championship standings

Pos.	Constructor	Points
1	(Austria) KTM	25
2	(Japan) Honda	11

Teams' Championship standings

Pos.	Team	Points
1	(Germany) Liqui Moly Dynavolt Intact GP	31
2	(Spain) CFMoto Gaviota Aspar Team	28
3	(Finland) Red Bull KTM Ajo	22
4	(France) Red Bull KTM Tech3	16
5	(Japan) Honda Team Asia	11

== Notes ==
Previous race: 2025 Valencian Grand Prix	FIM Grand Prix World Championship; 2026 season	Next race: 2026 Brazilian Grand Prix
Previous race: 2025 Thailand Grand Prix	Thailand motorcycle Grand Prix	Next race: 2027 Thailand Grand Prix
