= 2026 Czech motorcycle Grand Prix =

Motorcycle races in Brno

(Czech Republic) 2026 Czech Grand Prix
Race details
- Race 9 of 22 races in the 2026 Grand Prix motorcycle racing season
- Date: 21 June 2026
- Official name: Monster Energy Grand Prix of Czechia
- Location: Creditas Autodrom Brno; Brno, Czech Republic
- Course: Permanent racing facility; 5.403 km (3.357 mi)

MotoGP
Pole position
Rider	(Japan) Ai Ogura	Aprilia
Time	1:51.139	
Fastest lap
Rider	(Italy) Fabio Di Giannantonio	Ducati
Time	1:53.122 on lap 21	
Podium
First	(Spain) Marc Márquez	Ducati
Second	(Japan) Ai Ogura	Aprilia
Third	(Italy) Francesco Bagnaia	Ducati

Moto2
Pole position
Rider	(Colombia) David Alonso	Kalex
Time	1:57.718	
Fastest lap
Rider	(Czech Republic) Filip Salač	Kalex
Time	1:58.590 on lap 6	
Podium
First	(Spain) Iván Ortolá	Kalex
Second	(Colombia) David Alonso	Kalex
Third	(Czech Republic) Filip Salač	Kalex

Moto3
Pole position
Rider	(Spain) David Almansa	KTM
Time	2:04.069	
Fastest lap
Rider	(Indonesia) Veda Pratama	Honda
Time	2:04.524 on lap 4	
Podium
First	(Malaysia) Hakim Danish	KTM
Second	(Spain) Brian Uriarte	KTM
Third	(Spain) Máximo Quiles	KTM

The 2026 Czech motorcycle Grand Prix (officially known as the Monster Energy Grand Prix of Czechia) was the ninth round of the 2026 Grand Prix motorcycle racing season. All races were held at the Creditas Autodrom Brno in Brno on 21 June 2026.

== Qualifying ==
=== MotoGP ===
Fastest session lap

Pos.	No.	Rider	Team	Constructor	Q1	Q2	Final grid	Row
1	79	(Japan) Ai Ogura	SuperFile Trackhouse MotoGP Team	Aprilia	Qualified to Q2	1:51.139	1	1
2	49	(Italy) Fabio Di Giannantonio	Pertamina Enduro VR46 Racing Team	Ducati	Qualified to Q2	1:51.350	2	1
3	63	(Italy) Francesco Bagnaia	Ducati Lenovo Team	Ducati	Qualified to Q2	1:51.383	3	1
4	72	(Italy) Marco Bezzecchi	Aprilia Racing	Aprilia	Qualified to Q2	1:51.428	4	2
5	93	(Spain) Marc Márquez	Ducati Lenovo Team	Ducati	Qualified to Q2	1:51.436	5	2
6	11	(Brazil) Diogo Moreira	Pro Honda LCR	Honda	Qualified to Q2	1:51.691	6	2
7	25	(Spain) Raúl Fernández	SuperFile Trackhouse MotoGP Team	Aprilia	Qualified to Q2	1:51.772	7	3
8	37	(Spain) Pedro Acosta	Red Bull KTM Factory Racing	KTM	Qualified to Q2	1:51.821	8	3
9	21	(Italy) Franco Morbidelli	Pertamina Enduro VR46 Racing Team	Ducati	1:52.020	1:51.851	9	3
10	89	(Spain) Jorge Martín	Aprilia Racing	Aprilia	1:51.819	1:51.909	10	4
11	54	(Spain) Fermín Aldeguer	BK8 Gresini Racing MotoGP	Ducati	Qualified to Q2	1:52.044	11	4
12	36	(Spain) Joan Mir	Honda HRC Castrol	Ducati	Qualified to Q2	1:52.084	12	4
13	12	(Spain) Maverick Viñales	Red Bull KTM Tech3	KTM	1:52.053	N/A	13	5
14	73	(Spain) Álex Márquez	BK8 Gresini Racing MotoGP	Ducati	1:52.086	N/A	14	5
15	20	(France) Fabio Quartararo	Monster Energy Yamaha MotoGP Team	Yamaha	1:52.185	N/A	15	5
16	10	(Italy) Luca Marini	Honda HRC Castrol	Honda	1:52.263	N/A	16	6
17	23	(Italy) Enea Bastianini	Red Bull KTM Tech3	KTM	1:52.357	N/A	17	6
18	43	(Australia) Jack Miller	Prima Pramac Yamaha MotoGP	Yamaha	1:52.420	N/A	18	6
19	42	(Spain) Álex Rins	Monster Energy Yamaha MotoGP Team	Yamaha	1:52.506	N/A	19	7
20	33	(South Africa) Brad Binder	Red Bull KTM Factory Racing	KTM	1:52.556	N/A	20	7
21	7	(Turkey) Toprak Razgatlıoğlu	Prima Pramac Yamaha MotoGP	Yamaha	1:52.626	N/A	22 (Note: 3-place grid penalty on Sunday race due to riding slow online.)	8
22	35	(United Kingdom) Cal Crutchlow	Castrol Honda LCR	Honda	1'53.599	N/A	21	7
Official MotoGP Qualifying 1 Report
Official MotoGP Qualifying 2 Report
Official MotoGP Grid Report

== MotoGP Sprint ==
The MotoGP Sprint was held on 20 June 2026.

Pos.	No.	Rider	Team	Manufacturer	Laps	Time/Retired	Grid	Points
1	63	(Italy) Francesco Bagnaia	Ducati Lenovo Team	Ducati	10	18:55.527	3	12
2	79	(Japan) Ai Ogura	SuperFile Trackhouse MotoGP Team	Aprilia	10	+0.241	1	9
3	93	(Spain) Marc Márquez	Ducati Lenovo Team	Ducati	10	+0.794	5	7
4	49	(Italy) Fabio Di Giannantonio	Pertamina Enduro VR46 Racing Team	Ducati	10	+2.905	2	6
5	89	(Spain) Jorge Martín	Aprilia Racing	Aprilia	10	+6.404	10	5
6	25	(Spain) Rául Fernández	SuperFile Trackhouse MotoGP Team	Aprilia	10	+7.440	7	4
7	23	(Italy) Enea Bastianini	Red Bull KTM Tech3	KTM	10	+8.110	16	3
8	54	(Spain) Fermín Aldeguer	BK8 Gresini Racing MotoGP	Ducati	10	+10.195	11	2
9	33	(South Africa) Brad Binder	Red Bull KTM Factory Racing	KTM	10	+10.984	19	1
10	36	(Spain) Joan Mir	Honda HRC Castrol	Honda	10	+11.103	12	
11	7	(Turkey) Toprak Razgatlıoğlu	Prima Pramac Yamaha MotoGP	Yamaha	10	+13.497	20	
12	21	(Italy) Franco Morbidelli	Pertamina Enduro VR46 Racing Team	Ducati	10	+14.942	9	
13	20	(France) Fabio Quartararo	Monster Energy Yamaha MotoGP Team	Yamaha	10	+15.038	14	
14	43	(Australia) Jack Miller	Prima Pramac Yamaha MotoGP	Yamaha	10	+16.151	17	
15	42	(Spain) Álex Rins	Monster Energy Yamaha MotoGP Team	Yamaha	10	+23.535 (Note: 8-second penalty due to low tyre pressure.)	18	
Ret	35	(United Kingdom) Cal Crutchlow	Castrol Honda LCR	Honda	9	Accident	21	
Ret	72	(Italy) Marco Bezzecchi	Aprilia Racing	Aprilia	8	Accident	4	
Ret	10	(Italy) Luca Marini	Honda HRC Castrol	Honda	6	Accident	15	
Ret	37	(Spain) Pedro Acosta	Red Bull KTM Factory Racing	KTM	5	Accident	8	
Ret	12	(Spain) Maverick Viñales	Red Bull KTM Tech3	KTM	0	Accident	13	
Ret	11	(Brazil) Diogo Moreira	Pro Honda LCR	Honda	0	Accident	6	
DNS	73	(Spain) Álex Márquez	BK8 Gresini Racing MotoGP	Ducati		Did not start		
Fastest sprint lap: (Italy) Francesco Bagnaia (Ducati) - 1:52.542 (lap 3)
Official MotoGP Sprint Report

== Race ==
=== MotoGP ===
Pos.	No.	Rider	Team	Manufacturer	Laps	Time/Retired	Grid	Points
1	93	(Spain) Marc Márquez	Ducati Lenovo Team	Ducati	21	39:51.297	4	25
2	79	(Japan) Ai Ogura	SuperFile Trackhouse MotoGP Team	Aprilia	21	+0.421	1	20
3	63	(Italy) Francesco Bagnaia	Ducati Lenovo Team	Ducati	21	+2.255	3	16
4	49	(Italy) Fabio Di Giannantonio	Pertamina Enduro VR46 Racing Team	Ducati	21	+2.424	2	13
5	36	(Spain) Joan Mir	Honda HRC Castrol	Honda	21	+12.810	11	11
6	54	(Spain) Fermín Aldeguer	BK8 Gresini Racing MotoGP	Ducati	21	+14.874	10	10
7	25	(Spain) Raúl Fernández	SuperFile Trackhouse MotoGP Team	Aprilia	21	+18.657	6	9
8	10	(Italy) Luca Marini	Honda HRC Castrol	Honda	21	+21.265	14	8
9	89	(Spain) Jorge Martín	Aprilia Racing	Aprilia	21	+21.401	9	7
10	23	(Italy) Enea Bastianini	Red Bull KTM Tech3	KTM	21	+22.273	15	6
11	11	(Brazil) Diogo Moreira	Pro Honda LCR	Honda	21	+22.881	5	5
12	33	(South Africa) Brad Binder	Red Bull KTM Factory Racing	KTM	21	+22.942	18	4
13	21	(Italy) Franco Morbidelli	Pertamina Enduro VR46 Racing Team	Ducati	21	+25.003	8	3
14	7	(Turkey) Toprak Razgatlıoğlu	Prima Pramac Yamaha MotoGP	Yamaha	21	+25.806	20	2
15	12	(Spain) Maverick Viñales	Red Bull KTM Tech3	KTM	21	+26.360	12	1
16	43	(Australia) Jack Miller	Prima Pramac Yamaha MotoGP	Yamaha	21	+33.121	16	
17	35	(United Kingdom) Cal Crutchlow	Castrol Honda LCR	Honda	21	+44.784	19	
Ret	37	(Spain) Pedro Acosta	Red Bull KTM Factory Racing	KTM	20	Technical	7	
Ret	42	(Spain) Álex Rins	Monster Energy Yamaha MotoGP Team	Yamaha	17	Retired in pits	17	
Ret	20	(France) Fabio Quartararo	Monster Energy Yamaha MotoGP Team	Yamaha	1	Accident	13	
DNS	73	(Spain) Álex Márquez	BK8 Gresini Racing MotoGP	Ducati		Did not start		
EX	72	(Italy) Marco Bezzecchi	Aprilia Racing	Aprilia		Excluded (Note: Suspended from the Sunday race following an incident with a marshal during the sprint race.)		
Fastest lap: (Italy) Fabio Di Giannantonio (Ducati) – 1:53.122 (lap 21)
Official MotoGP Race Report

=== Moto2 ===
Pos.	No.	Rider	Team	Manufacturer	Laps	Time/Retired	Grid	Points
1	4	(Spain) Iván Ortolá	QJMotor – Exocom – MSi	Kalex	18	35:53.143	5	25
2	80	(Colombia) David Alonso	CFMoto Inde Aspar Team	Kalex	18	+0.096	1	20
3	12	(Czech Republic) Filip Salač	OnlyFans American Racing Team	Kalex	18	+0.701	2	16
4	81	(Australia) Senna Agius	Liqui Moly Dynavolt Intact GP	Kalex	18	+2.058	4	13
5	18	(Spain) Manuel González	Liqui Moly Dynavolt Intact GP	Kalex	18	+5.157	13	11
6	28	(Spain) Izan Guevara	Blu Cru Pramac Yamaha Moto2	Boscoscuro	18	+5.190	6	10
7	96	(Spain) Daniel Holgado	CFMoto Inde Aspar Team	Kalex	18	+7.492	3	9
8	16	(United States) Joe Roberts	OnlyFans American Racing Team	Kalex	18	+7.879	9	8
9	13	(Italy) Celestino Vietti	HDR SpeedRS Team	Boscoscuro	18	+9.835	7	7
10	98	(Spain) José Antonio Rueda	Red Bull KTM Ajo	Kalex	18	+10.014	15	6
11	95	(Netherlands) Collin Veijer	Red Bull KTM Ajo	Kalex	18	+10.669	11	5
12	17	(Spain) Daniel Muñoz	Italtrans Racing Team	Kalex	18	+10.944	14	4
13	11	(Spain) Álex Escrig	Klint Racing Team	Forward	18	+15.549	8	3
14	72	(Japan) Taiyo Furusato	Idemitsu Honda Team Asia	Kalex	18	+16.400	12	2
15	84	(Netherlands) Zonta van den Goorbergh	Momoven Idrofoglia RW Racing Team	Kalex	18	+17.290	10	1
16	71	(Japan) Ayumu Sasaki	Momoven Idrofoglia RW Racing Team	Kalex	18	+19.676	16	
17	3	(Spain) Sergio García	Italjet Gresini Moto2	Kalex	18	+22.144	27	
18	53	(Turkey) Deniz Öncü	Elf Marc VDS Racing Team	Boscoscuro	18	+22.820	21	
19	14	(Italy) Tony Arbolino	Reds Fantic Racing	Kalex	18	+23.246	20	
20	32	(Italy) Luca Lunetta	HDR SpeedRS Team	Boscoscuro	18	+23.376	17	
21	99	(Spain) Adrián Huertas	Italtrans Racing Team	Kalex	18	+27.800	18	
22	54	(Spain) Alberto Ferrández	Blu Cru Pramac Yamaha Moto2	Boscoscuro	18	+28.238	24	
23	36	(Spain) Ángel Piqueras	QJMotor – Exocom – MSi	Kalex	18	+28.501	19	
24	22	(Australia) Jacob Roulstone	Idemitsu Honda Team Asia	Kalex	18	+34.496	25	
25	40	(Poland) Milan Pawelec	Italjet Gresini Moto2	Kalex	18	+34.857	23	
26	85	(Spain) Xabi Zurutuza	Klint Racing Team	Forward	18	+35.093	26	
Ret	44	(Spain) Arón Canet	Elf Marc VDS Racing Team	Boscoscuro	7	Accident	22	
DNS	7	(Belgium) Barry Baltus	Reds Fantic Racing	Kalex		Did not start		
Fastest lap: (Czech Republic) Filip Salač (Kalex) – 1:58.590 (lap 6)
Official Moto2 Race Report

=== Moto3 ===
Pos.	No.	Rider	Team	Manufacturer	Laps	Time/Retired	Grid	Points
1	13	(Malaysia) Hakim Danish	Aeon Credit – MT Helmets – MSi	KTM	16	33:34.264	14	25
2	51	(Spain) Brian Uriarte	Red Bull KTM Ajo	KTM	16	+0.466	4	20
3	28	(Spain) Máximo Quiles	CFMoto Gaviota Aspar Team	KTM	16	+0.629	2	16
4	22	(Spain) David Almansa	Liqui Moly Dynavolt Intact GP	KTM	16	+0.741	1	13
5	9	(Indonesia) Veda Pratama	Honda Team Asia	Honda	16	+0.900	20	11
6	83	(Spain) Álvaro Carpe	Red Bull KTM Ajo	KTM	16	+0.906	3	10
7	97	(Argentina) Marco Morelli	CFMoto Gaviota Aspar Team	KTM	16	+10.724	17	9
8	66	(Australia) Joel Kelso	Gryd Racing	Honda	16	+10.925	7	8
9	19	(United Kingdom) Scott Ogden	CIP Green Power	KTM	16	+11.080	6	7
10	73	(Argentina) Valentín Perrone	Red Bull KTM Tech3	KTM	16	+11.394	11	6
11	18	(Italy) Matteo Bertelle	LevelUp – MTA	KTM	16	+11.573	9	5
12	11	(Spain) Adrián Cruces	CIP Green Power	KTM	16	+11.635	18	4
13	88	(Spain) Marcos Uriarte	Liqui Moly Dynavolt Intact GP	KTM	16	+11.735	13	3
14	31	(Spain) Adrián Fernández	Leopard Racing	Honda	16	+12.026	10	2
15	6	(Japan) Ryusei Yamanaka	Aeon Credit – MT Helmets – MSi	KTM	16	+12.187	16	1
16	94	(Italy) Guido Pini	Leopard Racing	Honda	16	+13.811	24	
17	54	(Spain) Jesús Ríos	Rivacold Snipers Team	Honda	16	+15.031	12	
18	14	(New Zealand) Cormac Buchanan	Code Motorsports	KTM	16	+26.587	22	
19	32	(Japan) Zen Mitani	Honda Team Asia	Honda	16	+26.617	23	
20	21	(South Africa) Ruché Moodley	Code Motorsports	KTM	16	+26.814	19	
Ret	27	(Finland) Rico Salmela	Red Bull KTM Tech3	KTM	15	Collision	26	
Ret	8	(United Kingdom) Eddie O'Shea	Gryd Racing	Honda	15	Collision	5	
Ret	10	(Italy) Nicola Carraro	Rivacold Snipers Team	Honda	13	Retired in pits	25	
Ret	5	(Austria) Leo Rammerstorfer	Sic58 Squadra Corse	Honda	6	Accident	21	
Ret	67	(Republic of Ireland) Casey O'Gorman	Sic58 Squadra Corse	Honda	5	Accident	8	
Ret	78	(Spain) Joel Esteban	LevelUp – MTA	KTM	2	Accident	15	
Fastest lap: (Indonesia) Veda Pratama (Honda) – 2:04.524 (lap 4)
Official Moto3 Race Report

== Championship standings after the race ==
Below are the standings for the top five riders, constructors, and teams after the round.

=== MotoGP ===
Riders' Championship standings

	Pos.	Rider	Points
	1	(Italy) Marco Bezzecchi	180
	2	(Spain) Jorge Martín	172
	3	(Italy) Fabio Di Giannantonio	157
1	4	(Spain) Marc Márquez	140
1	5	(Japan) Ai Ogura	134

Constructors' Championship standings

Pos.	Constructor	Points
1	(Italy) Aprilia	267
2	(Italy) Ducati	262
3	(Austria) KTM	163
4	(Japan) Honda	95
5	(Japan) Yamaha	51

Teams' Championship standings

	Pos.	Team	Points
	1	(Italy) Aprilia Racing	352
	2	(Italy) Ducati Lenovo Team	267
	3	(United States) SuperFile Trackhouse MotoGP Team	240
1	4	(Italy) Pertamina Enduro VR46 Racing Team	200
1	5	(Austria) Red Bull KTM Factory Racing	185

=== Moto2 ===
Riders' Championship standings

	Pos.	Rider	Points
	1	(Spain) Manuel González	165.5
	2	(Spain) Izan Guevara	115
	3	(Italy) Celestino Vietti	109
	4	(Australia) Senna Agius	107
1	5	(Colombia) David Alonso	91

Constructors' Championship standings

Pos.	Constructor	Points
1	(Germany) Kalex	207.5
2	(Italy) Boscoscuro	136
3	(Switzerland) Forward	33

Teams' Championship standings

Pos.	Team	Points
1	(Germany) Liqui Moly Dynavolt Intact GP	272.5
2	(Spain) CFMoto Inde Aspar Team	176
3	(Italy) Blu Cru Pramac Yamaha Moto2	123.5
4	(Italy) HDR SpeedRS Team	116
5	(United States) OnlyFans American Racing Team	93

=== Moto3 ===
Riders' Championship standings

	Pos.	Rider	Points
	1	(Spain) Máximo Quiles	186
	2	(Spain) Álvaro Carpe	121
2	3	(Spain) Brian Uriarte	92
	4	(Spain) David Almansa	89
2	5	(Argentina) Marco Morelli	86

Constructors' Championship standings

Pos.	Constructor	Points
1	(Austria) KTM	220
2	(Japan) Honda	120

Teams' Championship standings

Pos.	Team	Points
1	(Spain) CFMoto Gaviota Aspar Team	272
2	(Finland) Red Bull KTM Ajo	213
3	(Germany) Liqui Moly Dynavolt Intact GP	147
4	(France) Red Bull KTM Tech3	101
5	(Italy) LevelUp – MTA	86

== Notes ==
Previous race: 2026 Hungarian Grand Prix	FIM Grand Prix World Championship; 2026 season	Next race: 2026 Dutch TT
Previous race: 2025 Czech Grand Prix	Czech motorcycle Grand Prix	Next race: 2027 Czech Grand Prix
