= 2026 Dutch TT =

Motorcycle races in Assen

(Netherlands) 2026 Dutch TT
Race details
- Race 10 of 22 races in the 2026 Grand Prix motorcycle racing season
- Date: 28 June 2026
- Official name: Tissot Grand Prix of the Netherlands
- Location: TT Circuit Assen; Assen, Netherlands
- Course: Permanent racing facility; 4.542 km (2.822 mi)

MotoGP
Pole position
Rider	(Spain) Jorge Martín	Aprilia
Time	1:30.812	
Fastest lap
Rider	(Japan) Ai Ogura	Aprilia
Time	1:32.483 on lap 15	
Podium
First	(Japan) Ai Ogura	Aprilia
Second	(Spain) Raúl Fernández	Aprilia
Third	(Spain) Jorge Martín	Aprilia

Moto2
Pole position
Rider	(Colombia) David Alonso	Kalex
Time	1:35.236	
Fastest lap
Rider	(Australia) Senna Agius	Kalex
Time	1:36.214 on lap 18	
Podium
First	(Colombia) David Alonso	Kalex
Second	(Spain) Manuel González	Kalex
Third	(Australia) Senna Agius	Kalex

Moto3
Pole position
Rider	(Spain) Máximo Quiles	KTM
Time	1:40.130	
Fastest lap
Rider	(Republic of Ireland) Casey O'Gorman	Honda
Time	1:40.810 on lap 5	
Podium
First	(Spain) Máximo Quiles	KTM
Second	(Spain) David Almansa	KTM
Third	(Argentina) Marco Morelli	KTM

The 2026 Dutch TT (officially known as the Tissot Grand Prix of the Netherlands) was the tenth round of the 2026 Grand Prix motorcycle racing season. All races were held at the TT Circuit Assen in Assen on 28 June 2026.

== Qualifying ==
=== MotoGP ===
Fastest session lap

Pos.	No.	Rider	Team	Constructor	Q1	Q2	Final grid	Row
1	89	(Spain) Jorge Martín	Aprilia Racing	Aprilia	Qualified to Q2	1:30.812	1	1
2	79	(Japan) Ai Ogura	SuperFile Trackhouse MotoGP Team	Aprilia	Qualified to Q2	1:30.823	2	1
3	72	(Italy) Marco Bezzecchi	Aprilia Racing	Aprilia	Qualified to Q2	1:30.845	3	1
4	25	(Spain) Raúl Fernández	SuperFile Trackhouse MotoGP Team	Aprilia	Qualified to Q2	1:30.915	4	2
5	63	(Italy) Francesco Bagnaia	Ducati Lenovo Team	Ducati	Qualified to Q2	1:30.930	5	2
6	49	(Italy) Fabio Di Giannantonio	Pertamina Enduro VR46 Racing Team	Ducati	Qualified to Q2	1:30.955	6	2
7	93	(Spain) Marc Márquez	Ducati Lenovo Team	Ducati	Qualified to Q2	1:31.131	7	3
8	37	(Spain) Pedro Acosta	Red Bull KTM Factory Racing	KTM	Qualified to Q2	1:31.224	8	3
9	20	(France) Fabio Quartararo	Monster Energy Yamaha MotoGP Team	Yamaha	1'31.271	1:31.316	9	3
10	36	(Spain) Joan Mir	Honda HRC Castrol	Honda	1'31.315	1:31.504	10	4
11	23	(Italy) Enea Bastianini	Red Bull KTM Tech3	KTM	Qualified to Q2	1:31.604	11	4
12	73	(Spain) Álex Márquez	BK8 Gresini Racing MotoGP	Ducati	Qualified to Q2	No time set	12	4
13	21	(Italy) Franco Morbidelli	Pertamina Enduro VR46 Racing Team	Ducati	1:31.426	N/A	16 (Note: 3-place grid penalty on Sunday race due to riding slow on the racing line during Free Practice 1.)	6
14	11	(Brazil) Diogo Moreira	Pro Honda LCR	Honda	1:31.718	N/A	13	5
15	33	(South Africa) Brad Binder	Red Bull KTM Factory Racing	KTM	1:31.922	N/A	14	5
16	42	(Spain) Álex Rins	Monster Energy Yamaha MotoGP Team	Yamaha	1:32.085	N/A	15	5
17	10	(Italy) Luca Marini	Honda HRC Castrol	Honda	1:32.162	N/A	17	6
18	43	(Australia) Jack Miller	Prima Pramac Yamaha MotoGP	Yamaha	1:32.367	N/A	18	6
19	12	(Spain) Maverick Viñales	Red Bull KTM Tech3	KTM	1:32.790	N/A	19	7
20	47	(Spain) Augusto Fernández	Yamaha Factory Racing	Yamaha	1:32.887	N/A	20	7
21	35	(United Kingdom) Cal Crutchlow	Castrol Honda LCR	Honda	1:32.978	N/A	21	7
22	7	(Turkey) Toprak Razgatlıoğlu	Prima Pramac Yamaha MotoGP	Yamaha	1:33.125	N/A	22	8
Official MotoGP Qualifying 1 Report
Official MotoGP Qualifying 2 Report
Official MotoGP Grid Report

== MotoGP Sprint ==
The MotoGP Sprint was held on 27 June 2026.

Pos.	No.	Rider	Team	Manufacturer	Laps	Time/Retired	Grid	Points
1	25	(Spain) Raúl Fernández	SuperFile Trackhouse MotoGP Team	Aprilia	13	20:05.310	4	12
2	79	(Japan) Ai Ogura	SuperFile Trackhouse MotoGP Team	Aprilia	13	+0.362	2	9
3	49	(Italy) Fabio Di Giannantonio	Pertamina Enduro VR46 Racing Team	Ducati	13	+1.131	6	7
4	72	(Italy) Marco Bezzecchi	Aprilia Racing	Aprilia	13	+2.161	3	6
5	89	(Spain) Jorge Martín	Aprilia Racing	Aprilia	13	+4.591	1	5
6	93	(Spain) Marc Márquez	Ducati Lenovo Team	Ducati	13	+4.801	7	4
7	63	(Italy) Francesco Bagnaia	Ducati Lenovo Team	Ducati	13	+4.652 (Note: One-position penalty due to exceeding track limit on the final lap.)	5	3
8	23	(Italy) Enea Bastianini	Red Bull KTM Tech3	KTM	13	+5.237	11	2
9	37	(Spain) Pedro Acosta	Red Bull KTM Factory Racing	KTM	13	+9.598	8	1
10	20	(France) Fabio Quartararo	Monster Energy Yamaha MotoGP Team	Yamaha	13	+11.134	9	
11	11	(Brazil) Diogo Moreira	Pro Honda LCR	Honda	13	+11.811	14	
12	10	(Italy) Luca Marini	Honda HRC Castrol	Honda	13	+12.983	17	
13	73	(Spain) Álex Márquez	BK8 Gresini Racing MotoGP	Ducati	13	+13.102	12	
14	33	(South Africa) Brad Binder	Red Bull KTM Factory Racing	KTM	13	+13.414	15	
15	42	(Spain) Álex Rins	Monster Energy Yamaha MotoGP Team	Yamaha	13	+14.513	16	
16	12	(Spain) Maverick Viñales	Red Bull KTM Tech3	KTM	13	+15.286	19	
17	7	(Turkey) Toprak Razgatlıoğlu	Prima Pramac Yamaha MotoGP	Yamaha	13	+19.188	22	
18	47	(Spain) Augusto Fernández	Yamaha Factory Racing	Yamaha	13	+29.001	20	
19	35	(United Kingdom) Cal Crutchlow	Castrol Honda LCR	Honda	13	+29.213	21	
Ret	21	(Italy) Franco Morbidelli	Pertamina Enduro VR46 Racing Team	Ducati	11	Accident	13	
Ret	43	(Australia) Jack Miller	Prima Pramac Yamaha MotoGP	Yamaha	5	Technical	18	
Ret	36	(Spain) Joan Mir	Honda HRC Castrol	Honda	0	Accident	10	
DNS	54	(Spain) Fermín Aldeguer	BK8 Gresini Racing MotoGP	Ducati		Injury		
Fastest sprint lap: (Japan) Ai Ogura (Aprilia) - 1:32.003 (lap 11)
Official MotoGP Sprint Report

== Race ==
=== MotoGP ===
Pos.	No.	Rider	Team	Manufacturer	Laps	Time/Retired	Grid	Points
1	79	(Japan) Ai Ogura	SuperFile Trackhouse MotoGP Team	Aprilia	26	40:21.905	2	25
2	25	(Spain) Raúl Fernández	SuperFile Trackhouse MotoGP Team	Aprilia	26	+2.004	4	20
3	89	(Spain) Jorge Martín	Aprilia Racing	Aprilia	26	+3.512	1	16
4	49	(Italy) Fabio Di Giannantonio	Pertamina Enduro VR46 Racing Team	Ducati	26	+9.315	6	13
5	73	(Spain) Álex Márquez	BK8 Gresini Racing MotoGP	Ducati	26	+10.140	12	11
6	23	(Italy) Enea Bastianini	Red Bull KTM Tech3	KTM	26	+10.388	11	10
7	93	(Spain) Marc Márquez	Ducati Lenovo Team	Ducati	26	+10.288 (Note: Demoted one position for exceeding track limits on the final lap.)	7	9
8	20	(France) Fabio Quartararo	Monster Energy Yamaha MotoGP Team	Yamaha	26	+19.039	9	8
9	42	(Spain) Álex Rins	Monster Energy Yamaha MotoGP Team	Yamaha	26	+20.302	15	7
10	10	(Italy) Luca Marini	Honda HRC Castrol	Honda	26	+20.669	17	6
11	33	(South Africa) Brad Binder	Red Bull KTM Factory Racing	KTM	26	+35.383 (Note: 16-second penalty due to low tyre pressure.)	14	5
12	43	(Australia) Jack Miller	Prima Pramac Yamaha MotoGP	Yamaha	26	+37.244	18	4
13	12	(Spain) Maverick Viñales	Red Bull KTM Tech3	KTM	26	+36.755	19	3
14	11	(Brazil) Diogo Moreira	Pro Honda LCR	Honda	26	+38.127	13	2
15	47	(Spain) Augusto Fernández	Yamaha Factory Racing	Yamaha	26	+1:16.826	20	1
16	35	(United Kingdom) Cal Crutchlow	Castrol Honda LCR	Honda	25	+1 lap	21	
Ret	63	(Italy) Francesco Bagnaia	Ducati Lenovo Team	Ducati	15	Technical	5	
Ret	7	(Turkey) Toprak Razgatlıoğlu	Prima Pramac Yamaha MotoGP	Yamaha	13	Technical	22	
Ret	37	(Spain) Pedro Acosta	Red Bull KTM Factory Racing	KTM	13	Physical issue	8	
Ret	21	(Italy) Franco Morbidelli	Pertamina Enduro VR46 Racing Team	Ducati	9	Accident	16	
Ret	72	(Italy) Marco Bezzecchi	Aprilia Racing	Aprilia	1	Accident	3	
Ret	36	(Spain) Joan Mir	Honda HRC Castrol	Honda	0	Accident	10	
DNS	54	(Spain) Fermín Aldeguer	BK8 Gresini Racing MotoGP	Ducati		Injury		
Fastest lap: (Japan) Ai Ogura (Aprilia) – 1:32.483 (lap 15)
Official MotoGP Race Report

=== Moto2 ===
Pos.	No.	Rider	Team	Manufacturer	Laps	Time/Retired	Grid	Points
1	80	(Colombia) David Alonso	CFMoto Azul Marino Aspar Team	Kalex	22	35:33.175	1	25
2	18	(Spain) Manuel González	Liqui Moly Dynavolt Intact GP	Kalex	22	+0.024	7	20
3	81	(Australia) Senna Agius	Liqui Moly Dynavolt Intact GP	Kalex	22	+0.234	6	16
4	28	(Spain) Izan Guevara	Blu Cru Pramac Yamaha Moto2	Boscoscuro	22	+2.795	3	13
5	4	(Spain) Iván Ortolá	QJMotor – Xeramic – MSi	Kalex	22	+4.355	15	11
6	96	(Spain) Daniel Holgado	CFMoto Azul Marino Aspar Team	Kalex	22	+7.374	4	10
7	99	(Spain) Adrián Huertas	Italtrans Racing Team	Kalex	22	+8.455	12	9
8	12	(Czech Republic) Filip Salač	OnlyFans American Racing Team	Kalex	22	+9.437	10	8
9	95	(Netherlands) Collin Veijer	Red Bull KTM Ajo	Kalex	22	+12.177	14	7
10	54	(Spain) Alberto Ferrández	Blu Cru Pramac Yamaha Moto2	Boscoscuro	22	+12.288 (Note: 3-second penalty for failing to comply with long lap penalty.)	2	6
11	14	(Italy) Tony Arbolino	Reds Fantic Racing	Kalex	22	+15.495	17	5
12	32	(Italy) Luca Lunetta	HDR SpeedRS Team	Boscoscuro	22	+18.232	22	4
13	84	(Netherlands) Zonta van den Goorbergh	Momoven Idrofoglia RW Racing Team	Kalex	22	+18.579	13	3
14	36	(Spain) Ángel Piqueras	QJMotor – Xeramic – MSi	Kalex	22	+18.726	18	2
15	16	(United States) Joe Roberts	OnlyFans American Racing Team	Kalex	22	+21.054	9	1
16	44	(Spain) Arón Canet	Elf Marc VDS Racing Team	Boscoscuro	22	+21.303	16	
17	98	(Spain) José Antonio Rueda	Red Bull KTM Ajo	Kalex	22	+21.411	20	
18	72	(Japan) Taiyo Furusato	Idemitsu Honda Team Asia	Kalex	22	+21.501 (Note: 3-second penalty for shortcutting at turn 17.)	11	
19	71	(Japan) Ayumu Sasaki	Momoven Idrofoglia RW Racing Team	Kalex	22	+23.493	21	
20	85	(Spain) Xabi Zurutuza	Klint Racing Team	Forward	22	+23.601	23	
21	3	(Spain) Sergio García	Italjet Gresini Moto2	Kalex	22	+24.373	24	
22	22	(Australia) Jacob Roulstone	Idemitsu Honda Team Asia	Kalex	22	+29.230	25	
23	40	(Poland) Milan Pawelec	Italjet Gresini Moto2	Kalex	22	+29.419	26	
24	11	(Spain) Álex Escrig	Klint Racing Team	Forward	22	+33.552 (Note: 26-second penalty for failing to comply with ride through penalty.)	8	
25	9	(Spain) Jorge Navarro	Reds Fantic Racing	Kalex	22	+37.515	27	
Ret	53	(Turkey) Deniz Öncü	Elf Marc VDS Racing Team	Boscoscuro	16	Accident	19	
Ret	13	(Italy) Celestino Vietti	HDR SpeedRS Team	Boscoscuro	2	Accident	5	
Ret	17	(Spain) Daniel Muñoz	Italtrans Racing Team	Kalex	2	Accident	28	
Fastest lap: (Australia) Senna Agius (Kalex) – 1:36.214 (lap 18)
Official Moto2 Race Report

=== Moto3 ===
Following heavy rainfall prior to the race, the long lap penalty loop was rendered unusable and riders who exceeded track limits were instead given time penalties at the end of the race.

Pos.	No.	Rider	Team	Manufacturer	Laps	Time/Retired	Grid	Points
1	28	(Spain) Máximo Quiles	CFMoto Gaviota Aspar Team	KTM	20	33:51.801	1	25
2	22	(Spain) David Almansa	Liqui Moly Dynavolt Intact GP	KTM	20	+0.513	6	20
3	97	(Argentina) Marco Morelli	CFMoto Gaviota Aspar Team	KTM	20	+2.433	4	16
4	73	(Argentina) Valentín Perrone	Red Bull KTM Tech3	KTM	20	+2.551	19	13
5	54	(Spain) Jesús Ríos	Rivacold Snipers Team	Honda	20	+2.921	21	11
6	51	(Spain) Brian Uriarte	Red Bull KTM Ajo	KTM	20	+4.438	3	10
7	13	(Malaysia) Hakim Danish	Aeon Credit – MT Helmets – MSi	KTM	20	+4.475	16	9
8	66	(Australia) Joel Kelso	Gryd Racing	Honda	20	+5.895 (Note: 3-second penalty for exceeding track limits.)	2	8
9	31	(Spain) Adrián Fernández	Leopard Racing	Honda	20	+7.240	10	7
10	67	(Republic of Ireland) Casey O'Gorman	Sic58 Squadra Corse	Honda	20	+8.010	14	6
11	27	(Finland) Rico Salmela	Red Bull KTM Tech3	KTM	20	+8.885 (Note: 6-second penalty for riding slow on the racing line during Friday practice.)	17	5
12	78	(Spain) Joel Esteban	LevelUp – MTA	KTM	20	+11.333	22	4
13	6	(Japan) Ryusei Yamanaka	Aeon Credit – MT Helmets – MSi	KTM	20	+11.408	12	3
14	18	(Italy) Matteo Bertelle	LevelUp – MTA	KTM	20	+11.617	13	2
15	8	(United Kingdom) Eddie O'Shea	Gryd Racing	Honda	20	+11.896	15	1
16	19	(United Kingdom) Scott Ogden	CIP Green Power	KTM	20	+11.908	18	
17	5	(Austria) Leo Rammerstorfer	Sic58 Squadra Corse	Honda	20	+39.754	23	
18	94	(Italy) Guido Pini	Leopard Racing	Honda	20	+14.837 (Note: 3-second penalty for exceeding track limits during the race and one-position penalty for exceeding track limits on the final lap.)	9	
19	10	(Italy) Nicola Carraro	Rivacold Snipers Team	Honda	20	+1:13.409	25	
Ret	88	(Spain) Marcos Uriarte	Liqui Moly Dynavolt Intact GP	KTM	17	Accident	11	
Ret	83	(Spain) Álvaro Carpe	Red Bull KTM Ajo	KTM	15	Collision damage	8	
Ret	9	(Indonesia) Veda Pratama	Honda Team Asia	Honda	8	Accident damage	7	
Ret	32	(Japan) Zen Mitani	Honda Team Asia	Honda	2	Accident	20	
Ret	14	(New Zealand) Cormac Buchanan	Code Motorsports	KTM	1	Accident	24	
Ret	11	(Spain) Adrián Cruces	CIP Green Power	KTM	1	Collision damage	5	
DNS	21	(South Africa) Ruché Moodley	Code Motorsports	KTM		Injury		
Fastest lap: (Republic of Ireland) Casey O'Gorman (Honda) –1:40.810 (lap 5)
Official Moto3 Race Report

== Championship standings after the race ==
Below are the standings for the top five riders, constructors, and teams after the round.

=== MotoGP ===
Riders' Championship standings

	Pos.	Rider	Points
1	1	(Spain) Jorge Martín	193
1	2	(Italy) Marco Bezzecchi	186
	3	(Italy) Fabio Di Giannantonio	177
1	4	(Japan) Ai Ogura	168
1	5	(Spain) Marc Márquez	153

Constructors' Championship standings

Pos.	Constructor	Points
1	(Italy) Aprilia	304
2	(Italy) Ducati	282
3	(Austria) KTM	175
4	(Japan) Honda	101
5	(Japan) Yamaha	59

Teams' Championship standings

	Pos.	Team	Points
	1	(Italy) Aprilia Racing	379
1	2	(United States) SuperFile Trackhouse MotoGP Team	306
1	3	(Italy) Ducati Lenovo Team	283
	4	(Italy) Pertamina Enduro VR46 Racing Team	220
	5	(Austria) Red Bull KTM Factory Racing	191

=== Moto2 ===
Riders' Championship standings

	Pos.	Rider	Points
	1	(Spain) Manuel González	185.5
	2	(Spain) Izan Guevara	128
1	3	(Australia) Senna Agius	123
1	4	(Colombia) David Alonso	116
2	5	(Italy) Celestino Vietti	109

Constructors' Championship standings

Pos.	Constructor	Points
1	(Germany) Kalex	232.5
2	(Italy) Boscoscuro	149
3	(Switzerland) Forward	33

Teams' Championship standings

Pos.	Team	Points
1	(Germany) Liqui Moly Dynavolt Intact GP	308.5
2	(Spain) CFMoto Azul Marino Aspar Team	211
3	(Italy) Blu Cru Pramac Yamaha Moto2	142.5
4	(Italy) HDR SpeedRS Team	120
5	(United States) OnlyFans American Racing Team	102

=== Moto3 ===
Riders' Championship standings

	Pos.	Rider	Points
	1	(Spain) Máximo Quiles	211
	2	(Spain) Álvaro Carpe	121
1	3	(Spain) David Almansa	109
1	4	(Spain) Brian Uriarte	102
	5	(Argentina) Marco Morelli	102

Constructors' Championship standings

Pos.	Constructor	Points
1	(Austria) KTM	245
2	(Japan) Honda	131

Teams' Championship standings

	Pos.	Team	Points
	1	(Spain) CFMoto Gaviota Aspar Team	313
	2	(Finland) Red Bull KTM Ajo	223
	3	(Germany) Liqui Moly Dynavolt Intact GP	167
	4	(France) Red Bull KTM Tech3	119
1	5	(Spain) Aeon Credit – MT Helmets – MSi	97

== Notes ==
Previous race: 2026 Czech Republic Grand Prix	FIM Grand Prix World Championship; 2026 season	Next race: 2026 German Grand Prix
Previous race: 2025 Dutch TT	Dutch TT	Next race: 2027 Dutch TT
