= Joel Esteban =

Spanish motorcycle racer (born 2005)

- Esteban at the 2026 Czech Grand Prix
- Nationality: Spanish
- Born: 7 August 2005 (age 21); El Prat de Llobregat, Spain
- Current team: LevelUp – MTA
- Bike number: 78
Motorcycle racing career statistics
Moto3 World Championship
Active years	2024–
Manufacturers	CFMoto, KTM, Honda
2025 championship position	19th (33 pts)
Starts / Wins / Podiums / Poles / F. laps / Points; 46 / 0 / 0 / 1 / 1 / 156

Joel Esteban Ruiz (born 7 August 2005) is a Spanish Grand Prix motorcycle racer for LevelUp – MTA in the 2026 Moto3 World Championship.

== Career ==
=== European Talent Cup ===
In 2021, Esteban's debut season in the European Talent Cup, he managed to step onto the podium in his first race at Circuito do Estoril, which was his only podium of the season. With a consistent year and a fastest lap at the Circuit Ricardo Tormo, he finished eighth in the championship with 85 points. His debut season caught the attention of the Aspar Junior Team, who signed him for the 2022 European Talent Cup.

For 2022, Esteban kicked off his year by dominating the first round at Circuito do Estoril, achieving pole position, fastest lap and win in each race.

The second round at the Circuit Ricardo Tormo followed a similar pattern, with Esteban winning both races from pole position before a disqualification from the latter for a technical infringement. He extended his championship lead more at the Circuit de Barcelona-Catalunya, getting another pole position and finish on the podium with second place.

Esteban's championship charge was brought to an abrupt halt, as illness would cause him to miss the two races of the next round at Circuito de Jerez. On his return, Esteban came second at Algarve International Circuit, fifth in the first race at MotorLand Aragón, and third in the second race.

In the final round of the season at Circuit Ricardo Tormo, Esteban finished third and recorded the final fastest lap of the season, ultimately losing the championship to Guido Pini by seven points.

=== FIM JuniorGP World Championship ===
==== 2023 ====
With Aspar Junior Team, Esteban moved up to the FIM JuniorGP World Championship for the 2023 season. Esteban got his first pole positions in the second round at Circuit Ricardo Tormo, coming second in the first race – getting his first podium, and retiring from the second race.

At the fourth round of the series in Algarve International Circuit, Esteban collected his first win and fastest lap in the second race. A round later, he would snatch another podium in form of a third place at the second race in Circuit de Barcelona-Catalunya, where he also got another fastest lap.

Esteban retired from the next round at MotorLand Aragón, and in the final round of the series at Circuit Ricardo Tormo, he came seventh in the first race, bagging a fastest lap, and won the final race of the season. Esteban finished fourth in the championship with 132 points.

==== 2025 ====
After a difficult campaign in the 2024 Moto3 World Championship, Esteban returned to JuniorGP for the 2025 season with Aspar Junior Team.

Esteban got his first win of the year at Circuit de Nevers Magny-Cours, the third round of the series, where he also got the fastest lap.

=== Moto3 World Championship ===
==== 2024 ====
For 2024, Esteban made the leap to the Moto3 World Championship with the CFMoto Aspar Team and partnered the season's record-breaking champion David Alonso. He opened the season with several point-scoring finishes, including fourth at the 2024 French motorcycle Grand Prix. His form tailed off in the second half of the season, where he retired from his last two races at Thailand and Malaysia, as he couldn't compete in the final round of the championship at the 2024 Solidarity motorcycle Grand Prix due to injury and was replaced by Marcos Uriarte. Esteban finished the season in 17th with 45 points.

==== 2025 ====
Esteban served as a replacement rider for the 2025 Moto3 World Championship. He first replaced Jacob Roulstone at Red Bull KTM Tech3, who missed the first two rounds of the season due to a neck injury sustained at a private training session. At the 2025 Thailand motorcycle Grand Prix, Esteban finished ninth and at the 2025 Argentine motorcycle Grand Prix he ended sixteenth.

Not long after, he was called up at CFMoto Aspar Team to replace Máximo Quiles in the fourth and fifth rounds after a medical check ahead of the Qatar Grand Prix weekend revealed a thumb fracture, sustained during a pre-weekend training incident but initially overlooked. Esteban retired from both the Qatar and Spanish Grands Prix.

One round later, Esteban was called up to replace Leopard Racing rider Adrián Fernández at the 2025 British motorcycle Grand Prix, the seventh round of the season; he did not finish the race.

== Career statistics ==
=== European Talent Cup ===
==== Races by year ====
(key) (Races in bold indicate pole position; races in italics indicate fastest lap)

Year	Bike	1	2	3	4	5	6	7	8	9	10	11	12	Pos	Pts
2021	Honda	EST; 3	EST; 11	VAL; 5	VAL; 7	CAT; 6	POR; 11	ARA; Ret	ARA; C	JER; 10	JER; 5	VAL; 9	VAL; 11	8th	85
2022	Honda	**EST**; 1	**EST**; 1	**VAL**; 1	**VAL**; DSQ	**CAT**; 2	JER	JER	POR; 2	ARA; 5	ARA; 3	VAL; 3		2nd	158

=== FIM JuniorGP World Championship ===
==== Races by year ====
(key) (Races in bold indicate pole position) (Races in italics indicate fastest lap)

Year	Bike	1	2	3	4	5	6	7	8	9	10	11	12	Pos	Pts
2023	Gas Gas	EST; 10	**VAL1**; 2	**VAL2**; Ret	JER1; 11	JER2; 10	ALG1; 6	ALG2; 1	BAR1; 6	BAR2; 3	ARA; Ret	VAL3; 7	VAL4; 1	4th	132
2025	CFMoto	EST; 9	JER1; 5	JER2; 9	MAG; 1	ARA1; 5	ARA2; 5	MIS1; 5	MIS2; 4	BAR1; 8	BAR2; 3	VAL1; 6	VAL2; 3	3rd	146

=== Grand Prix motorcycle racing ===
==== By season ====
Season	Class	Motorcycle	Team	Race	Win	Podium	Pole	FLap	Pts	Plcd
2024	Moto3	CFMoto	CFMoto Aspar Team	19	0	0	0	1	45	17th
2025	Moto3	KTM	Red Bull KTM Tech3	3	0	0	0	0	33	19th
2025	Moto3	KTM	CFMoto Aspar Team	4	0	0	0	0	33	19th
2025	Moto3	Honda	Leopard Racing	1	0	0	0	0	33	19th
2026	Moto3	KTM	LevelUp – MTA	19	0	0	1	0	78*	14th*
Total				**46**	**0**	**0**	**1**	**1**	**156**	

==== By class ====
Class	Seasons	1st GP	1st Pod	1st Win	Race	Win	Podiums	Pole	FLap	Pts	WChmp
Moto3	2024–present	2024 Qatar			46	0	0	1	1	156	0
Total	2024–present				**46**	**0**	**0**	**1**	**1**	**156**	**0**

==== Races by year ====
(key) (Races in bold indicate pole position; races in italics indicate fastest lap)

Year	Class	Bike	1	2	3	4	5	6	7	8	9	10	11	12	13	14	15	16	17	18	19	20	21	22	Pos	Pts
2024	Moto3	CFMoto	QAT; 11	POR; 8	AME; 9	SPA; Ret	FRA; 4	CAT; 14	ITA; 18	NED; 15	GER; 14	GBR; 13	AUT; 25	ARA; 15	RSM; 22	IMO; 20	INA; 14	JPN; 15	AUS; 16	THA; Ret	MAL; Ret	SOL			17th	45
2025	Moto3	KTM	THA; 9	ARG; 16	AME	QAT; Ret	SPA; Ret	FRA													AUS; 4	MAL; 16	POR; 4	VAL	19th	33
2025	Moto3	Honda							GBR; NC	ARA	ITA	NED	GER	CZE	AUT	HUN	CAT	RSM	JPN	INA					19th	33
2026	Moto3	KTM	THA; 9	**BRA**; Ret	USA; Ret	SPA; 10	FRA; 5	CAT; 15	ITA; 5	HUN; 13	CZE; Ret	NED; 12	GER; Ret	GBR; 5	ARA; 16	RSM; Ret	AUT; 16	JPN; 9	INA; 9	AUS; C	MAL; 6	QAT; Ret	POR	VAL	14th*	78*

* Season still in progress.
