= 2024 French motorcycle Grand Prix =

Motorcycle races in Le Mans

(France) 2024 French Grand Prix
Race details
- Race 5 of 20 races in the 2024 Grand Prix motorcycle racing season
- Date: 11–12 May 2024
- Official name: Michelin Grand Prix de France
- Location: Bugatti Circuit; Le Mans, France
- Course: Permanent racing facility; 4.185 km (2.600 mi)

MotoGP
Pole position
Rider	(Spain) Jorge Martín	Ducati
Time	1:29.919	
Fastest lap
Rider	(Italy) Enea Bastianini	Ducati
Time	1:31.107 on lap 23	
Podium
First	(Spain) Jorge Martín	Ducati
Second	(Spain) Marc Márquez	Ducati
Third	(Italy) Francesco Bagnaia	Ducati

Moto2
Pole position
Rider	(Spain) Arón Canet	Kalex
Time	1:35.037	
Fastest lap
Rider	(Spain) Arón Canet	Kalex
Time	1:35.796 on lap 5	
Podium
First	(Spain) Sergio García	Boscoscuro
Second	(Japan) Ai Ogura	Boscoscuro
Third	(Spain) Alonso López	Boscoscuro

Moto3
Pole position
Rider	(Colombia) David Alonso	CFMoto
Time	1:40.114	
Fastest lap
Rider	(Spain) Joel Esteban	CFMoto
Time	1:41.059 on lap 14	
Podium
First	(Colombia) David Alonso	CFMoto
Second	(Spain) Daniel Holgado	Gas Gas
Third	(Netherlands) Collin Veijer	Husqvarna

MotoE Race 1
Pole position
Rider	(Spain) Héctor Garzó	Ducati
Time	1:39.995	
Fastest lap
Rider	(Spain) Héctor Garzó	Ducati
Time	1:39.882 on lap 3	
Podium
First	(Italy) Nicholas Spinelli	Ducati
Second	(Italy) Kevin Zannoni	Ducati
Third	(Italy) Mattia Casadei	Ducati

MotoE Race 2
Pole position
Rider	(Spain) Héctor Garzó	Ducati
Time	1:39.995	
Fastest lap
Rider	(Italy) Nicholas Spinelli	Ducati
Time	1:40.198 on lap 3	
Podium
First	(Italy) Nicholas Spinelli	Ducati
Second	(Italy) Mattia Casadei	Ducati
Third	(Spain) Oscar Gutiérrez	Ducati

The 2024 French motorcycle Grand Prix (officially known as the Michelin Grand Prix de France) was the fifth round of the 2024 Grand Prix motorcycle racing season and the second round of the 2024 MotoE World Championship. All races (except for both MotoE races which were held on 11 May) were held at the Bugatti Circuit in Le Mans on 12 May 2024.

== MotoGP Sprint ==
The MotoGP Sprint was held on 11 May.

Pos.	No.	Rider	Team	Constructor	Laps	Time/Retired	Grid	Points
1	89	(Spain) Jorge Martín	Prima Pramac Racing	Ducati	13	19:49.694	1	12
2	93	(Spain) Marc Márquez	Gresini Racing MotoGP	Ducati	13	+2.280	13	9
3	12	(Spain) Maverick Viñales	Aprilia Racing	Aprilia	13	+4.174	3	7
4	23	(Italy) Enea Bastianini	Ducati Lenovo Team	Ducati	13	+4.798	10	6
5	41	(Spain) Aleix Espargaró	Aprilia Racing	Aprilia	13	+7.698	6	5
6	31	(Spain) Pedro Acosta	Red Bull GasGas Tech3	KTM	13	+9.185	7	4
7	49	(Italy) Fabio Di Giannantonio	Pertamina Enduro VR46 Racing Team	Ducati	13	+11.190	4	3
8	43	(Australia) Jack Miller	Red Bull KTM Factory Racing	KTM	13	+11.516	11	2
9	25	(Spain) Raúl Fernández	Trackhouse Racing	Aprilia	13	+12.257	14	1
10	20	(France) Fabio Quartararo	Monster Energy Yamaha MotoGP Team	Yamaha	13	+12.699	8	
11	88	(Portugal) Miguel Oliveira	Trackhouse Racing	Aprilia	13	+13.492	12	
12	21	(Italy) Franco Morbidelli	Prima Pramac Racing	Ducati	13	+15.578	9	
13	5	(France) Johann Zarco	Castrol Honda LCR	Honda	13	+16.439	15	
14	73	(Spain) Álex Márquez	Gresini Racing MotoGP	Ducati	13	+16.816	17	
15	33	(South Africa) Brad Binder	Red Bull KTM Factory Racing	KTM	13	+16.969	22	
16	30	(Japan) Takaaki Nakagami	Idemitsu Honda LCR	Aprilia	13	+19.123	19	
17	37	(Spain) Augusto Fernández	Red Bull GasGas Tech3	KTM	13	+23.618	20	
18	10	(Italy) Luca Marini	Repsol Honda Team	Honda	13	+27.854	21	
Ret	72	(Italy) Marco Bezzecchi	Pertamina Enduro VR46 Racing Team	Ducati	9	Accident	5	
Ret	42	(Spain) Álex Rins	Monster Energy Yamaha MotoGP Team	Yamaha	6	Accident	16	
Ret	36	(Spain) Joan Mir	Repsol Honda Team	Honda	4	Retired	18	
Ret	1	(Italy) Francesco Bagnaia	Ducati Lenovo Team	Ducati	3	Technical issue	2	
Fastest sprint lap: (Italy) Marco Bezzecchi (Ducati) – 1:30.852 (lap 3)
OFFICIAL MOTOGP SPRINT REPORT

== Race ==
=== MotoGP ===
Pos.	No.	Rider	Team	Constructor	Laps	Time/Retired	Grid	Points
1	89	(Spain) Jorge Martín	Prima Pramac Racing	Ducati	27	41:23.709	1	25
2	93	(Spain) Marc Márquez	Gresini Racing MotoGP	Ducati	27	+0.446	13	20
3	1	(Italy) Francesco Bagnaia	Ducati Lenovo Team	Ducati	27	+0.585	2	16
4	23	(Italy) Enea Bastianini	Ducati Lenovo Team	Ducati	27	+2.206	10	13
5	12	(Spain) Maverick Viñales	Aprilia Racing	Aprilia	27	+4.053	3	11
6	49	(Italy) Fabio Di Giannantonio	Pertamina Enduro VR46 Racing Team	Ducati	27	+9.480	4	10
7	21	(Italy) Franco Morbidelli	Prima Pramac Racing	Ducati	27	+9.868	9	9
8	33	(South Africa) Brad Binder	Red Bull KTM Factory Racing	KTM	27	+10.353	22	8
9	41	(Spain) Aleix Espargaró	Aprilia Racing	Aprilia	27	+11.392	6	7
10	73	(Spain) Álex Márquez	Gresini Racing MotoGP	Ducati	27	+13.442	17	6
11	25	(Spain) Raúl Fernández	Trackhouse Racing	Aprilia	27	+24.201	14	5
12	5	(France) Johann Zarco	Castrol Honda LCR	Honda	27	+26.809	15	4
13	37	(Spain) Augusto Fernández	Red Bull GasGas Tech3	KTM	27	+27.426	20	3
14	30	(Japan) Takaaki Nakagami	Idemitsu Honda LCR	Honda	27	+30.026	19	2
15	42	(Spain) Álex Rins	Monster Energy Yamaha MotoGP Team	Yamaha	27	+30.936	16	1
16	10	(Italy) Luca Marini	Repsol Honda Team	Honda	27	+40.000	21	
Ret	20	(France) Fabio Quartararo	Monster Energy Yamaha MotoGP Team	Yamaha	16	Accident	8	
Ret	43	(Australia) Jack Miller	Red Bull KTM Factory Racing	KTM	16	Accident	11	
Ret	88	(Portugal) Miguel Oliveira	Trackhouse Racing	Aprilia	16	Technical issue	12	
Ret	36	(Spain) Joan Mir	Repsol Honda Team	Honda	14	Accident	18	
Ret	72	(Italy) Marco Bezzecchi	Pertamina Enduro VR46 Racing Team	Ducati	3	Accident	5	
Ret	31	(Spain) Pedro Acosta	Red Bull GasGas Tech3	KTM	2	Accident	7	
Fastest lap: (Italy) Enea Bastianini (Ducati) – 1:31.107 (lap 23)
OFFICIAL MOTOGP RACE REPORT

=== Moto2 ===
Pos.	No.	Rider	Constructor	Laps	Time/Retired	Grid	Points
1	3	(Spain) Sergio García	Boscoscuro	22	35:20.709	3	25
2	79	(Japan) Ai Ogura	Boscoscuro	22	+3.174	17	20
3	21	(Spain) Alonso López	Boscoscuro	22	+3.704	5	16
4	16	(United States) Joe Roberts	Kalex	22	+3.764	2	13
5	35	(Thailand) Somkiat Chantra	Kalex	22	+3.935	13	11
6	44	(Spain) Arón Canet	Kalex	22	+4.511	1	10
7	54	(Spain) Fermín Aldeguer	Boscoscuro	22	+4.811	12	9
8	14	(Italy) Tony Arbolino	Kalex	22	+6.811	10	8
9	75	(Spain) Albert Arenas	Kalex	22	+8.831	4	7
10	28	(Spain) Izan Guevara	Kalex	22	+14.215	7	6
11	52	(Spain) Jeremy Alcoba	Kalex	22	+17.795	14	5
12	12	(Czech Republic) Filip Salač	Kalex	22	+18.044	9	4
13	81	(Australia) Senna Agius	Kalex	22	+18.191	8	3
14	15	(South Africa) Darryn Binder	Kalex	22	+18.349	19	2
15	24	(Spain) Marcos Ramírez	Kalex	22	+19.686	18	1
16	5	(Spain) Jaume Masià	Kalex	22	+21.460	20	
17	96	(United Kingdom) Jake Dixon	Kalex	22	+26.939	11	
18	53	(Turkey) Deniz Öncü	Kalex	22	+30.633	22	
19	71	(Italy) Dennis Foggia	Kalex	18	+30.804	27	
20	9	(Spain) Jorge Navarro	Forward	22	+37.741	26	
21	20	(Andorra) Xavi Cardelús	Kalex	22	+37.994	25	
22	22	(Japan) Ayumu Sasaki	Kalex	22	+38.968	23	
23	17	(Spain) Daniel Muñoz	Kalex	21	+1 lap	24	
24	18	(Spain) Manuel González	Kalex	20	+2 laps	6	
25	84	(Netherlands) Zonta van den Goorbergh	Kalex	20	+2 laps	15	
26	10	(Brazil) Diogo Moreira	Kalex	19	+3 laps	21	
Ret	43	(Spain) Xavier Artigas	Forward	15	Accident	28	
Ret	7	(Belgium) Barry Baltus	Kalex	2	Accident	16	
Fastest lap: (Spain) Arón Canet (Kalex) – 1:35.796 (lap 5)
OFFICIAL MOTO2 RACE REPORT

=== Moto3 ===
Pos.	No.	Rider	Constructor	Laps	Time/Retired	Grid	Points
1	80	(Colombia) David Alonso	CFMoto	20	34:00.058	1	25
2	96	(Spain) Daniel Holgado	Gas Gas	20	+0.105	2	20
3	95	(Netherlands) Collin Veijer	Husqvarna	20	+0.242	5	16
4	78	(Spain) Joel Esteban	CFMoto	20	+0.476	16	13
5	48	(Spain) Iván Ortolá	KTM	20	+0.612	6	11
6	31	(Spain) Adrián Fernández	Honda	20	+0.797	4	10
7	6	(Japan) Ryusei Yamanaka	KTM	20	+0.958	10	9
8	99	(Spain) José Antonio Rueda	KTM	20	+1.035	3	8
9	24	(Japan) Tatsuki Suzuki	Husqvarna	20	+1.101	14	7
10	36	(Spain) Ángel Piqueras	Honda	20	+2.163	9	6
11	58	(Italy) Luca Lunetta	Honda	20	+6.715	15	5
12	12	(Australia) Jacob Roulstone	Gas Gas	20	+6.903	11	4
13	66	(Australia) Joel Kelso	KTM	20	+7.217	7	3
14	72	(Japan) Taiyo Furusato	Honda	20	+10.776	17	2
15	22	(Spain) David Almansa	Honda	20	+11.350	22	1
16	85	(Spain) Xabi Zurutuza	KTM	20	+13.275	18	
17	82	(Italy) Stefano Nepa	KTM	20	+16.200	23	
18	55	(Switzerland) Noah Dettwiler	KTM	20	+27.941	24	
19	10	(Italy) Nicola Carraro	KTM	20	+28.799	20	
20	5	(Thailand) Tatchakorn Buasri	Honda	20	+34.168	26	
21	70	(United Kingdom) Joshua Whatley	Honda	20	+47.787	25	
Ret	64	(Spain) David Muñoz	KTM	16	Retired in pits	8	
Ret	18	(Italy) Matteo Bertelle	Honda	15	Technical issue	19	
Ret	19	(United Kingdom) Scott Ogden	Honda	10	Accident	12	
Ret	54	(Italy) Riccardo Rossi	KTM	7	Accident	13	
Ret	7	(Italy) Filippo Farioli	Honda	1	Retired in pits	21	
Fastest lap: (Spain) Joel Esteban (CFMoto) – 1:41.059 (lap 14)
OFFICIAL MOTO3 RACE REPORT

== Championship standings after the race ==
Below are the standings for the top five riders, constructors, and teams after the round.

=== MotoGP ===
Riders' Championship standings

	Pos.	Rider	Points
	1	(Spain) Jorge Martín	129
	2	(Italy) Francesco Bagnaia	91
3	3	(Spain) Marc Márquez	89
1	4	(Italy) Enea Bastianini	89
	5	(Spain) Maverick Viñales	81

Constructors' Championship standings

Pos.	Constructor	Points
1	(Italy) Ducati	170
2	(Austria) KTM	107
3	(Italy) Aprilia	100
4	(Japan) Yamaha	28
5	(Japan) Honda	17

Teams' Championship standings

	Pos.	Team	Points
	1	(Italy) Ducati Lenovo Team	180
1	2	(Italy) Prima Pramac Racing	144
1	3	(Italy) Aprilia Racing	132
	4	(Italy) Gresini Racing MotoGP	122
	5	(Austria) Red Bull KTM Factory Racing	91

=== Moto2 ===
Riders' Championship standings

	Pos.	Rider	Points
1	1	(Spain) Sergio García	89
1	2	(United States) Joe Roberts	82
	3	(Spain) Fermín Aldeguer	63
1	4	(Japan) Ai Ogura	63
1	5	(Spain) Alonso López	54

Constructors' Championship standings

Pos.	Constructor	Points
1	(Italy) Boscoscuro	113
2	(Germany) Kalex	98

Teams' Championship standings

	Pos.	Team	Points
	1	(Spain) MT Helmets – MSi	152
1	2	(Italy) Folladore Speed Up	117
1	3	(United States) OnlyFans American Racing Team	111
	4	(Italy) QJmotor Gresini Moto2	84
	5	(Italy) Fantic Racing	48

=== Moto3 ===
Riders' Championship standings

Pos.	Rider	Points
1	(Spain) Daniel Holgado	94
2	(Colombia) David Alonso	93
3	(Netherlands) Collin Veijer	62
4	(Spain) Iván Ortolá	50
5	(Australia) Joel Kelso	42

Constructors' Championship standings

Pos.	Constructor	Points
1	(Spain) Gas Gas	94
2	(China) CFMoto	93
3	(Austria) KTM	77
4	(Sweden) Husqvarna	72
5	(Japan) Honda	58

Teams' Championship standings

	Pos.	Team	Points
1	1	(Spain) CFMoto Gaviota Aspar Team	126
1	2	(France) Red Bull GasGas Tech3	121
1	3	(Germany) Liqui Moly Husqvarna Intact GP	92
1	4	(Spain) MT Helmets – MSi	85
2	5	(Spain) Boé Motorsports	80

=== MotoE ===
Riders' Championship standings

	Pos.	Rider	Points
	1	(Italy) Mattia Casadei	77
1	2	(Italy) Nicholas Spinelli	75
2	3	(Italy) Kevin Zannoni	47
2	4	(Spain) Oscar Gutiérrez	41
3	5	(Spain) Héctor Garzó	40

Teams' Championship standings

	Pos.	Team	Points
1	1	(Monaco) LCR E-Team	100
2	2	(France) Tech3 E-Racing	92
2	3	(Germany) Dynavolt Intact GP MotoE	78
1	4	(Spain) Openbank Aspar Team	71
1	5	(Spain) Axxis – MSi	56

Previous race: 2024 Spanish Grand Prix	FIM Grand Prix World Championship; 2024 season	Next race: 2024 Catalan Grand Prix
Previous race: 2023 French Grand Prix	French motorcycle Grand Prix	Next race: 2025 French Grand Prix
