= 2023 FIM JuniorGP World Championship =

Junior Motorcycle World Championship

2023 FIM JuniorGP World Championship
Previous:	2022	Next:	2024
Support series: FIM Moto2 European Championship; Stock European Championship; European Talent Cup

The 2023 FIM JuniorGP World Championship is the second season after leaving the historical connection to CEV.

== Calendar ==
The provisional calendar was published in November 2022.

Round	Date	Circuit	Pole position	Fastest lap	Race winner	Winning constructor	ref
1	7 May	(Portugal) Estoril	(Italy) Luca Lunetta	(Spain) Alvaro Carpe	(Italy) Nico Carraro	(Spain) Gas Gas	
2	21 May	(Spain) Valencia	(Spain) Joel Esteban	(Italy) Nico Carraro	(Spain) Ángel Piqueras	(Japan) Honda	
2	21 May	(Spain) Valencia	(Spain) Joel Esteban	(Australia) Jacob Roulstone	(Spain) Ángel Piqueras	(Japan) Honda	
3	4 June	(Spain) Jerez	(Spain) Ángel Piqueras	(United Kingdom) Eddie O'Shea	(Spain) Ángel Piqueras	(Japan) Honda	
3	4 June	(Spain) Jerez	(Spain) Ángel Piqueras	(Spain) Ángel Piqueras	(Spain) David Almansa	(Austria) KTM	
4	2 July	(Portugal) Portimão	(Italy) Luca Lunetta	(Spain) Xabi Zurutuza	(Spain) Xabi Zurutuza	(Austria) KTM	
4	2 July	(Portugal) Portimão	(Italy) Luca Lunetta	(Spain) Joel Esteban	(Spain) Joel Esteban	(Spain) Gas Gas	
5	16 July	(Spain) Barcelona	(Spain) Ángel Piqueras	(Spain) Álvaro Carpe	(Spain) Xabi Zurutuza	(Austria) KTM	
5	16 July	(Spain) Barcelona	(Spain) Ángel Piqueras	(Spain) Joel Esteban	(Indonesia) Fadillah Arbi Aditama	(Japan) Honda	
6	8 October	(Spain) Aragón	(Spain) Ángel Piqueras	(Spain) Adrián Cruces	(Spain) Ángel Piqueras	(Japan) Honda	
7	5 November	(Spain) Valencia	(Spain) Xabi Zurutuza	(Spain) Joel Esteban	(Spain) Adrián Cruces	(Spain) KTM Mir Racing	
7	5 November	(Spain) Valencia	(Spain) Xabi Zurutuza	(Italy) Nico Carraro	(Spain) Joel Esteban	(Spain) Gas Gas	

== Entry list ==
Team	Constructor	No.	Rider	Rounds
(Spain) Aspar Junior Team	Gas Gas	7	(Spain) Joel Esteban	All
(Spain) Aspar Junior Team	Gas Gas	10	(Italy) Nicola Carraro	All
(Spain) Aspar Junior Team	Gas Gas	12	(Australia) Jacob Roulstone	All
(Spain) Artbox	Honda	36	(Australia) Angus Grenfell	1–2, 4–7
(Japan) Asia Talent Team	Honda	57	(Malaysia) Danial Sharil	3–7
(Japan) Asia Talent Team	Honda	88	(Japan) Shinya Ezawa	1–2
(Indonesia) Astra Honda Racing Team	Honda	93	(Indonesia) Fadillah Arbi Aditama	All
(United Kingdom) British Talent Team	Honda	8	(United Kingdom) Eddie O'Shea	All
Honda Racing Thailand	Honda	5	(Thailand) Tatchakorn Buasri	All
(Spain) Team Estrella Galicia 0,0	Honda	18	(Spain) Ángel Piqueras	All
(Spain) Team Estrella Galicia 0,0	Honda	23	(Italy) Elia Bartolini	1–5
(Spain) Team Estrella Galicia 0,0	Honda	67	(Republic of Ireland) Casey O'Gorman	6–7
(Spain) Team Estrella Galicia 0,0	Honda	74	(France) Alex Gourdon	All
(Spain) Team Estrella Galicia 0,0	Honda	94	(Uruguay) Facundo Llambías	All
(Spain) Team Larresport	Honda	72	(Japan) Kanta Hamada	5
(Spain) Laglisse Academy	Husqvarna	9	(China) Shuai Li	4–6
(Spain) Laglisse Academy	Husqvarna	11	(Spain) Adrián Cruces	1–2
(Spain) Laglisse Academy	Husqvarna	83	(Spain) Álvaro Carpe	All
(Spain) Laglisse Academy	Husqvarna	89	(Spain) Marcos Uriarte	3–5
(Germany) Liqui Moly Husqvarna Intact Junior GP Team	Husqvarna	50	(Austria) Leo Rammerstorfer	All
(Germany) Liqui Moly Husqvarna Intact Junior GP Team	Husqvarna	78	(Austria) Jakob Rosenthaler	All
(Italy) AC Racing Team	KTM	34	(Italy) Cesare Tiezzi	All
(Italy) AC Racing Team	KTM	58	(Italy) Luca Lunetta	All
(Spain) AGR Team	KTM	14	(New Zealand) Cormac Buchanan	All
(Spain) AGR Team	KTM	71	(Canada) Torin Collins	All
(Italy) Angeluss MTA Team	KTM	37	(Italy) Alessio Mattei	1–4, 6
(Italy) Angeluss MTA Team	KTM	52	(Japan) Aoi Uezu	5, 7
(Italy) Angeluss MTA Team	KTM	85	(Spain) Xabi Zurutuza	All
(Italy) Angeluss MTA Team	KTM	91	(Japan) Kotaro Uchiumi	All
(Spain) Cuna de Campeones	KTM	28	(India) Geoffrey Emmanuel	1–4, 6–7
(Spain) Cuna de Campeones	KTM	55	(Switzerland) Noah Dettwiler	All
(Italy) Eagle-1	KTM	19	(Italy) Alessandro Morosi	All
(Spain) First Bike Academy	KTM	48	(France) Gabin Planques	1, 3–7
(Spain) Finetwork MIR Racing Team	KTM Mir Racing	11	(Spain) Adrián Cruces	3–7
(Spain) Finetwork MIR Racing Team	KTM Mir Racing	22	(Spain) David Almansa	All
(Spain) Finetwork MIR Racing Team	KTM Mir Racing	69	(Spain) Marcos Ruda	1–5
Entry lists:

== Championship standings ==
Points were awarded to the top fifteen riders, provided the rider finished the race.

Position	1st	2nd	3rd	4th	5th	6th	7th	8th	9th	10th	11th	12th	13th	14th	15th
Points	25	20	16	13	11	10	9	8	7	6	5	4	3	2	1

=== Riders' standings ===
Pos.	Rider	Bike	EST (Portugal)	VAL (Spain)		JER (Spain)		ALG (Portugal)		BAR (Spain)		ARA (Spain)	VAL (Spain)		Pts
1	(Spain) Ángel Piqueras	Honda	2	1	1	1^{P}	3^{PF}	7	2	3^{P}	6^{P}	1^{P}	3	4	220
2	(Italy) Luca Lunetta	KTM	4^{P}	3	4	4	21	3^{P}	13^{P}	11	4	2	6	3	138
3	(Spain) Álvaro Carpe	Husqvarna	DSQ	10	3^{F}	2	2	5	4	7^{F}	Ret	5	2	5	137
4	(Spain) Joel Esteban	Gas Gas	10	2^{P}	Ret^{P}	11	10	6	1^{F}	6	3^{F}	Ret	7^{F}	1	132
5	(Spain) Adrián Cruces	Husqvarna	Ret	9	7										123
5	(Spain) Adrián Cruces	KTM Mir Racing				3	8	Ret	Ret	5	5	3^{F}	1	2	123
6	(Spain) Xabi Zurutuza	KTM	6	12	5	Ret	6	1^{F}	Ret	1	Ret	4	4^{P}	7^{P}	120
7	(Australia) Jacob Roulstone	Gas Gas	5	4	2^{F}	6	5	9	15	2	Ret	Ret	9	6	110
8	(Italy) Nicola Carraro	Gas Gas	1	5^{F}	12	DNS	DNS	10	12	4	Ret	17	5	9	81
9	(Spain) David Almansa	KTM Mir Racing	Ret	Ret	Ret	Ret	1	4	3	22	2	Ret			74
10	(United Kingdom) Eddie O'Shea	Honda	9	11	6	16^{F}	Ret	Ret	5	12	Ret	6	11	8	69
11	(Thailand) Tatchakorn Buasri	Honda	8	13	Ret	12	17	2	6	10	Ret	8	16	DNS	59
12	(Austria) Jakob Rosenthaler	Husqvarna	3	DNS	DNS	9	12	12	8	Ret	13	10	Ret	11	53
13	(Italy) Alessandro Morosi	KTM	11	6	Ret	Ret	11	8	16	9	Ret	12	8	10	53
14	(New Zealand) Cormac Buchanan	KTM	13	7	Ret	5	4	Ret	7	17	11	20	Ret	20	50
15	(Italy) Elia Bartolini	Honda	7	8	Ret	8	4	Ret	10	11	9				45
16	(Uruguay) Facundo Llambías	Honda	17	14	9	18	24	16	13	8	7	7	10	Ret	44
17	(Indonesia) Fadillah Arbi Aditama	Honda	15	16	Ret	17	9	Ret	25	18	1	13	13	Ret	39
18	(Spain) Marcos Ruda	KTM Mir Racing	18	Ret	8	10	13	11	20	16	8				30
19	(Switzerland) Noah Dettwiler	KTM	12	15	10	13	16	14	18	21	12	11	15	12	30
20	(Malaysia) Danial Shahril	Honda				7	15	15	9	15	Ret	15	22	15	21
21	(Japan) Kotaro Uchiumi	KTM	Ret	18	14	22	20	21	21	19	10	16	14	17	10
22	(Austria) Leo Rammerstorfer	Husqvarna	16	19	13	15	19	18	17	20	Ret	14	12	Ret	10
23	(Republic of Ireland) Casey O'Gorman	Honda										9	Ret	14	9
24	(Spain) Marcos Uriarte	Husqvarna				14	18	13	14	14	19				9
25	(Japan) Shinya Ezawa	Honda	14	17	11										7
26	(South Africa) Ruché Moodley	KTM Mir Racing											25	13	3
27	(France) Alex Gourdon	Honda	21	24	18	23	Ret	20	Ret	25	14	21	20	21	2
28	(Italy) Cesare Tiezzi	KTM	Ret	21	16	20	Ret	19	19	23	15	DNS	18	16	1
29	(Canada) Torin Collins	KTM	Ret	20	15	19	Ret	Ret	23	27	18	22	19	19	1
30	(Japan) Kanta Hamada	Honda								Ret	16				0
31	(France) Gabin Planques	KTM	20			24	22	17	26	24	17	19	21	18	0
32	(Australia) Angus Grenfell	Honda	19	23	DNS			Ret	22	WD	WD	18	17	Ret	0
33	(Italy) Alessio Mattei	KTM	23	22	17	21	Ret	22	24			23			0
34	(India) Geoffrey Emmanuel	Honda	22	25	19	Ret	23	23	27			24	23	23	0
35	(Hungary) Kevin Farkas	Husqvarna											Ret	22	0
36	(Japan) Aoi Uezu	KTM								26	Ret		24	24	0
37	(Australia) Ryan Larkin	Husqvarna										25			0
	(China) Li Shuai	Husqvarna						DNQ	DNQ	DNQ	DNQ	DNQ			0
Pos.	Rider	Bike	EST (Portugal)	VAL (Spain)		JER (Spain)		ALG (Portugal)		BAR (Spain)		ARA (Spain)	VAL (Spain)		Pts

=== Constructors' championship ===
Pos.	Constructor	EST (Portugal)	VAL (Spain)		JER (Spain)		ALG (Portugal)		BAR (Spain)		ARA (Spain)	VAL (Spain)		Points
1	(Japan) Honda	2	1	1	1	3	2	1	3	1	1	3	4	251
2	(Austria) KTM	4	3	4	4	1	1	3	1	2	2	4	3	215
3	(Spain) Gas Gas	1	2	2	6	5	6	1	2	3	17	5	1	173
4	(Sweden) Husqvarna	3	9	3	2	2	5	4	5	5	5	2	5	166
5	(Spain) KTM Mir Racing	18	Ret	8	10	1	4	3	16	2	3	1	2	149
Pos.	Constructor	EST (Portugal)	VAL (Spain)		JER (Spain)		ALG (Portugal)		BAR (Spain)		ARA (Spain)	VAL (Spain)		Points
