= 2025 Spanish motorcycle Grand Prix =

Motorcycle races in Jerez de la Frontera

(Spain) 2025 Spanish Grand Prix
Race details
- Race 5 of 22 races in the 2025 Grand Prix motorcycle racing season
- Date: 27 April 2025
- Official name: Estrella Galicia 0,0 Grand Prix of Spain
- Location: Circuito de Jerez – Ángel Nieto; Jerez de la Frontera, Cádiz, Spain
- Course: Permanent racing facility; 4.423 km (2.748 mi)

MotoGP
Pole position
Rider	(France) Fabio Quartararo	Yamaha
Time	1:35.610	
Fastest lap
Rider	(Spain) Álex Márquez	Ducati
Time	1:37.349 on lap 4	
Podium
First	(Spain) Álex Márquez	Ducati
Second	(France) Fabio Quartararo	Yamaha
Third	(Italy) Francesco Bagnaia	Ducati

Moto2
Pole position
Rider	(Spain) Manuel González	Kalex
Time	1:39.858	
Fastest lap
Rider	(Spain) Manuel González	Kalex
Time	1:40.351 on lap 3	
Podium
First	(Spain) Manuel González	Kalex
Second	(Belgium) Barry Baltus	Kalex
Third	(Australia) Senna Agius	Kalex

Moto3
Pole position
Rider	(Spain) José Antonio Rueda	KTM
Time	1:43.755	
Fastest lap
Rider	(Spain) José Antonio Rueda	KTM
Time	1:44.352 on lap 12	
Podium
First	(Spain) José Antonio Rueda	KTM
Second	(Spain) Ángel Piqueras	KTM
Third	(Australia) Joel Kelso	KTM

The 2025 Spanish motorcycle Grand Prix (officially known as the Estrella Galicia 0,0 Grand Prix of Spain) was the fifth round of the 2025 Grand Prix motorcycle racing season. All races were held at the Circuito de Jerez – Ángel Nieto in Jerez de la Frontera on 27 April 2025.

Factory Yamaha rider Fabio Quartararo started from pole position, his first since the 2022 Indonesian Grand Prix and was the first non-Ducati pole position since the 2024 Japanese Grand Prix.

In this series, MotoGP introduces the 'Rider Of The Race' program which will take place every Sunday Grand Prix race. Rider of the Race is an award voted by MotoGP fans for the most outstanding rider in a race, and Fabio Quartararo was chosen as the first rider to win Rider of The Race.

In class MotoGP, Álex Márquez managed to win the race in this series and became his first victory in the MotoGP class. Following Alex's victory in this series, he and his brother, Marc Márquez, became the first siblings to successfully step on the highest podium in the MotoGP era.

== Practice session ==
=== MotoGP ===
==== Combined Free Practice 1-2 ====
Practice times (written in bold) are the fastest times in the session.

Fastest session lap

Pos.	No.	Biker	Constructor	Practice times	
Pos.	No.	Biker	Constructor	P1	P2
1	93	(Spain) Marc Márquez	Ducati	1:37.188	**1:36.677**
2	73	(Spain) Álex Márquez	Ducati	**1:36.831**	1:37.259
3	12	(Spain) Maverick Viñales	KTM	1:37.425	**1:36.887**
4	20	(France) Fabio Quartararo	Yamaha	1:37.421	**1:36.978**
5	63	(Italy) Francesco Bagnaia	Ducati	1:37.532	**1:37.097**
6	43	(Australia) Jack Miller	Yamaha	1:37.517	**1:37.220**
7	49	(Italy) Fabio Di Giannantonio	Ducati	1:37.857	**1:37.283**
8	72	(Italy) Marco Bezzecchi	Aprilia	1:37.936	**1:37.296**
9	21	(Italy) Franco Morbidelli	Ducati	1:37.639	**1:37.303**
10	10	(Italy) Luca Marini	Honda	1:38.095	**1:37.321**
11	33	(South Africa) Brad Binder	KTM	1:38.036	**1:37.340**
12	37	(Spain) Pedro Acosta	KTM	1:38.169	**1:37.436**
13	36	(Spain) Joan Mir	Honda	1:37.501	**1:37.473**
14	54	(Spain) Fermín Aldeguer	Ducati	1:38.168	**1:37.486**
15	41	(Spain) Aleix Espargaró	Honda	1:37.746	**1:37.515**
16	5	(France) Johann Zarco	Honda	**1:37.538**	1:37.592
17	42	(Spain) Álex Rins	Yamaha	**1:37.561**	1:38.699
18	79	(Japan) Ai Ogura	Aprilia	1:38.094	**1:37.703**
19	25	(Spain) Raúl Fernández	Aprilia	1:38.479	**1:37.776**
20	7	(Spain) Augusto Fernández	Yamaha	1:38.157	**1:37.800**
21	23	(Italy) Enea Bastianini	KTM	1:38.400	**1:38.060**
22	35	(Thailand) Somkiat Chantra	Honda	1:39.327	**1:38.849**
23	32	(Spain) Lorenzo Savadori	Aprilia	1:39.599	**1:39.287**
OFFICIAL MOTOGP COMBINED PRACTICE TIMES REPORT

==== Practice ====
The top 10 riders (written in bold) qualified for Q2.

Fastest session lap

Pos.	No.	Biker	Constructor	
Pos.	No.	Biker	Constructor	Time results
1	73	**(Spain) Álex Márquez**	**Ducati**	**1:35.991**
2	63	**(Italy) Francesco Bagnaia**	**Ducati**	**1:36.094**
3	21	**(Italy) Franco Morbidelli**	**Ducati**	**1:36.153**
4	93	**(Spain) Marc Márquez**	**Ducati**	**1:36.258**
5	20	**(France) Fabio Quartararo**	**Yamaha**	**1:36.419**
6	54	**(Spain) Fermín Aldeguer**	**Ducati**	**1:36.508**
7	5	**(France) Johann Zarco**	**Honda**	**1:36.535**
8	37	**(Spain) Pedro Acosta**	**KTM**	**1:36.630**
9	49	**(Italy) Fabio Di Giannantonio**	**Ducati**	**1:36.636**
10	36	**(Spain) Joan Mir**	**Honda**	**1:36.686**
11	33	(South Africa) Brad Binder	KTM	1:36.741
12	72	(Italy) Marco Bezzecchi	Aprilia	1:36.798
13	43	(Australia) Jack Miller	Yamaha	1:36.854
14	12	(Spain) Maverick Viñales	KTM	1:36.937
15	42	(Spain) Álex Rins	Yamaha	1:36.957
16	25	(Spain) Raúl Fernández	Aprilia	1:37.040
17	79	(Japan) Ai Ogura	Aprilia	1:37.072
18	10	(Italy) Luca Marini	Honda	1:37.077
19	23	(Italy) Enea Bastianini	KTM	1:37.188
20	7	(Spain) Augusto Fernández	Yamaha	1:37.219
21	41	(Spain) Aleix Espargaró	Honda	1:37.392
22	32	(Italy) Lorenzo Savadori	Aprilia	1:37.865
23	35	(Thailand) Somkiat Chantra	Honda	1:38.004
OFFICIAL MOTOGP PRACTICE TIMES REPORT

=== Moto2 ===
==== Combined Practice 1-2 ====
Fastest session lap

Pos.	No.	Biker	Constructor	Practice times	
Pos.	No.	Biker	Constructor	P1	P2
1	53	(Turkey) Deniz Öncü	Kalex	**1:39.836**	**1:39.564**
2	7	(Belgium) Barry Baltus	Kalex	1:39.956	1:40.577
3	18	(Spain) Manuel González	Kalex	1:39.980	1:40.115
4	13	(Italy) Celestino Vietti	Boscoscuro	1:41.469	1:40.171
5	44	(Spain) Arón Canet	Kalex	1:41.139	1:40.248
6	81	(Australia) Senna Agius	Kalex	1:40.336	1:40.253
7	80	(Colombia) David Alonso	Kalex	1:40.381	1:40.307
8	96	(United Kingdom) Jake Dixon	Boscoscuro	1:40.479	1:40.351
9	10	(Brazil) Diogo Moreira	Kalex	1:41.413	1:40.371
10	75	(Spain) Albert Arenas	Kalex	1:40.625	1:40.497
11	27	(Spain) Daniel Holgado	Kalex	1:41.312	1:40.516
12	24	(Spain) Marcos Ramírez	Kalex	1:41.171	1:40.536
13	9	(Spain) Jorge Navarro	Forward	1:42.192	1:40.569
14	21	(Spain) Alonso López	Boscoscuro	1:40.734	1:40.617
15	16	(United States) Joe Roberts	Kalex	1:41.457	1:40.635
16	12	(Czech Republic) Filip Salač	Boscoscuro	1:40.718	1:40.638
17	99	(Spain) Adrián Huertas	Kalex	1:41.957	1:40.638
18	95	(Netherlands) Collin Veijer	Kalex	1:41.087	1:40.761
19	71	(Japan) Ayumu Sasaki	Kalex	1:41.579	1:40.939
20	84	(Netherlands) Zonta van den Goorbergh	Kalex	1:41.322	1:40.958
22	11	(Spain) Álex Escrig	Forward	1:41.248	1:41.057
23	15	(South Africa) Darryn Binder	Kalex	1:41.184	1:41.058
24	14	(Italy) Tony Arbolino	Boscoscuro	1:41.181	1:41.104
25	28	(Spain) Izan Guevara	Boscoscuro	1:41.391	1:41.111
26	64	(Indonesia) Mario Aji	Kalex	1:41.315	1:41.335
27	4	(Spain) Iván Ortolá	Boscoscuro	1:41.570	1:41.709
28	92	(Japan) Yuki Kunii	Kalex	1:41.595	1:41.581
21	3	(Spain) Sergio García	Boscoscuro	1:42.202	1:41.041
OFFICIAL MOTO2 FREE PRACTICE TIMES REPORT

==== Practice ====
The top 14 riders (written in bold) qualified for Q2.

Pos.	No.	Biker	Constructor	Time results
Pos.	No.	Biker	Constructor	P1
1	18	**(Spain) Manuel González**	**Kalex**	1:40.142
2	7	**(Belgium) Barry Baltus**	**Kalex**	1:40.480
3	53	**(Turkey) Deniz Öncü**	**Kalex**	1:40.629
4	81	**(Australia) Senna Agius**	**Kalex**	1:40.631
5	75	**(Spain) Albert Arenas**	**Kalex**	1:40.731
6	44	**(Spain) Arón Canet**	**Kalex**	1:40.739
7	80	**(Colombia) David Alonso**	**Kalex**	1:40.786
8	27	**(Spain) Daniel Holgado**	**Kalex**	1:40.812
9	96	**(United Kingdom) Jake Dixon**	**Boscoscuro**	1:40.818
10	13	**(Italy) Celestino Vietti**	**Boscoscuro**	1:40.879
11	21	**(Spain) Alonso López**	**Boscoscuro**	1:40.912
12	16	**(United States) Joe Roberts**	**Kalex**	1:41.008
13	12	**(Czech Republic) Filip Salač**	**Boscoscuro**	1:41.016
14	10	**(Brazil) Diogo Moreira**	**Kalex**	1:41.082
15	99	(Spain) Adrián Huertas	Kalex	1:41.112
16	28	(Spain) Izan Guevara	Boscoscuro	1:41.234
17	95	(Netherlands) Collin Veijer	Kalex	1:41.247
18	64	(Indonesia) Mario Aji	Kalex	1:41.323
19	14	(Italy) Tony Arbolino	Boscoscuro	1:41.325
20	9	(Spain) Jorge Navarro	Forward	1:41.328
21	84	(Netherlands) Zonta van den Goorbergh	Kalex	1:41.359
22	4	(Spain) Iván Ortolá	Boscoscuro	1:41.369
23	24	(Spain) Marcos Ramírez	Kalex	1:41.390
24	15	(South Africa) Darryn Binder	Kalex	1:41.471
25	11	(Spain) Álex Escrig	Forward	1:41.661
26	71	(Japan) Ayumu Sasaki	Kalex	1:41.724
27	92	(Japan) Yuki Kunii	Kalex	1:41.744
28	3	(Spain) Sergio García	Boscoscuro	1:41.782
OFFICIAL MOTO2 PRACTICE TIMES REPORT

=== Moto3 ===
==== Combined Practice 1-2 ====
Fastest session lap

Pos.	No.	Biker	Constructor	Practice times	
Pos.	No.	Biker	Constructor	P1	P2
1	99	(Spain) José Antonio Rueda	KTM	**1:44.299**	1:44.505
2	31	(Spain) Adrián Fernández	Honda	1:45.223	**1:44.386**
3	66	(Australia) Joel Kelso	KTM	1:45.241	1:44.427
4	64	(Spain) David Muñoz	KTM	1:45.699	1:44.637
5	22	(Spain) David Almansa	Honda	1:45.272	1:44.920
6	94	(Italy) Guido Pini	KTM	1:45.976	1:44.963
7	83	(Spain) Álvaro Carpe	KTM	1:45.077	1:45.223
8	54	(Italy) Riccardo Rossi	Honda	1:46.837	1:45.218
9	6	(Japan) Ryusei Yamanaka	KTM	1:45.836	1:45.230
10	21	(South Africa) Ruche Moodley	KTM	1:45.250	1:45.234
11	58	(Italy) Luca Lunetta	Honda	1:45.521	1:45.272
12	28	(Spain) Joel Esteban	KTM	1:46.983	1:45.370
13	73	(Argentina) Valentín Perrone	KTM	1:46.828	1:45.413
14	72	(Japan) Taiyo Furusato	Honda	1:46.031	1:45.487
15	10	(Italy) Nicola Carraro	Honda	1:46.280	1:45.510
16	82	(Italy) Stefano Nepa	Honda	1:45.957	1:45.577
17	19	(United Kingdom) Scott Ogden	KTM	1:45.581	DSQ
18	5	(Thailand) Tatchakorn Buasri	Honda	1:47.321	1:45.656
19	36	(Spain) Ángel Piqueras	KTM	1:45.678	1:45.758
20	71	(Italy) Dennis Foggia	KTM	1:46.589	1:45.756
21	12	(Australia) Jacob Roulstone	KTM	1:46.704	1:45.776
22	55	(Switzerland) Noah Dettwiler	KTM	1:45.798	1:45.786
23	14	(New Zealand) Cormac Buchanan	KTM	1:46.146	1:46.051
24	32	(Spain) Vicente Pérez	KTM	1:46.325	1:46.251
25	8	(United Kingdom) Eddie O'Shea	Honda	1:48.142	1:46.330
26	11	(Spain) Adrián Cruces	KTM	1:47.923	1:46.447
OFFICIAL MOTO3 FREE PRACTICE TIMES REPORT

==== Practice ====
The top 14 riders (written in bold) qualified for Q2.

Pos.	No.	Biker	Constructor	Practice times
Pos.	No.	Biker	Constructor	P1
1	99	(Spain) **José Antonio Rueda**	**KTM**	**1:43.770**
2	83	(Spain) **Álvaro Carpe**	**KTM**	**1:44.812**
3	72	(Japan) **Taiyo Furusato**	**Honda**	**1:44.827**
4	6	(Japan) **Ryusei Yamanaka**	**KTM**	**1:44.847**
5	12	(Australia) **Jacob Roulstone**	**KTM**	**1:44.984**
6	64	(Spain) **David Muñoz**	**KTM**	**1:44.993**
7	36	(Spain) **Ángel Piqueras**	**KTM**	**1:45.051**
8	66	(Australia) **Joel Kelso**	**KTM**	**1:45.060**
9	21	(South Africa) **Ruche Moodley**	**KTM**	**1:45.091**
10	31	(Spain) **Adrián Fernández**	**Honda**	**1:45.153**
11	73	(Argentina) **Valentín Perrone**	**KTM**	**1:45.153**
12	94	(Italy) **Guido Pini**	**KTM**	**1:45.211**
13	55	(Switzerland) **Noah Dettwiler**	**KTM**	**1:45.522**
14	78	(Spain) **Joel Esteban**	**KTM**	**1:45.590**
15	22	(Spain) David Almansa	Honda	1:45.619
16	82	(Italy) Stefano Nepa	Honda	1:45.635
17	32	(Spain) Vicente Pérez	KTM	1:45.737
18	14	(New Zealand) Cormac Buchanan	KTM	1:45.778
19	58	(Italy) Luca Lunetta	Honda	1:45.896
20	5	(Thailand) Tatchakorn Buasri	Honda	1:46.042
21	10	(Italy) Nicola Carraro	Honda	1:46.057
22	71	(Italy) Dennis Foggia	KTM	1:46.106
23	8	(United Kingdom) Eddie O'Shea	Honda	1:46.200
24	19	(United Kingdom) Scott Ogden	KTM	1:46.356
25	11	(Spain) Adrián Cruces	KTM	1:46.943
NC	54	(Italy) Riccardo Rossi	Honda	
OFFICIAL MOTO3 PRACTICE TIMES REPORT

== Qualifying ==
=== MotoGP ===
Fastest session lap

Pos.	No.	Biker	Team	Constructor	Qualifying times		Final grid	Row
Pos.	No.	Biker	Team	Constructor	Q1	Q2	Final grid	Row
1	20	(France) Fabio Quartararo	Monster Energy Yamaha MotoGP Team	Yamaha	Qualified in Q2	1:35.610	1	1
2	93	(Spain) Marc Márquez	Ducati Lenovo Team	Ducati	Qualified in Q2	1:35.643	2	1
3	63	(Italy) Francesco Bagnaia	Ducati Lenovo Team	Ducati	Qualified in Q2	1:35.755	3	1
4	73	(Spain) Álex Márquez	BK8 Gresini Racing MotoGP	Ducati	Qualified in Q2	1:35.758	4	2
5	21	(Italy) Franco Morbidelli	Pertamina Enduro VR46 Racing Team	Ducati	Qualified in Q2	1:35.828	5	2
6	12	(Spain) Maverick Viñales	Red Bull KTM Tech3	KTM	1:36.284	1:35.852	6	2
7	54	(Spain) Fermín Aldeguer	BK8 Gresini Racing MotoGP	Ducati	Qualified in Q2	1:35.978	7	3
8	49	(Italy) Fabio Di Giannantonio	Pertamina Enduro VR46 Racing Team	Ducati	Qualified in Q2	1:36.054	8	3
9	36	(Spain) Joan Mir	Honda HRC Castrol	Honda	Qualified in Q2	1:36.161	9	3
10	5	(France) Johann Zarco	CASTROL Honda LCR	Honda	Qualified in Q2	1:36.207	10	4
11	72	(Italy) Marco Bezzecchi	Aprilia Racing	Aprilia	1:36.451	1:36.217	11	4
12	37	(Spain) Pedro Acosta	Red Bull KTM Factory Racing	KTM	Qualified in Q2	1:36.340	12	4
13	33	(South Africa) Brad Binder	Red Bull KTM Factory Racing	KTM	1:36.584	N/A	13	5
14	43	(Australia) Jack Miller	Prima Pramac Yamaha MotoGP	Yamaha	1:36.630	N/A	14	5
15	79	(Japan) Ai Ogura	Trackhouse MotoGP Team	Aprilia	1:36.700	N/A	15	5
16	10	(Italy) Luca Marini	Honda HRC Castrol	Honda	1:36.730	N/A	16	6
17	37	(Spain) Raúl Fernández	Trackhouse MotoGP Team	Aprilia	1:36.759	N/A	17	
18	23	(Italy) Enea Bastianini	Red Bull KTM Tech3	KTM	1:36.827	N/A	18	
19	41	(Spain) Aleix Espargaró	Honda HRC Test Team	Honda	1:36.981	N/A	19	7
20	7	(Spain) Augusto Fernández	Prima Pramac Yamaha MotoGP	Yamaha	1:37.004	N/A	20	
21	35	(Thailand) Somkiat Chantra	IDEMITSU Honda LCR	Honda	1:37.827	N/A	21	
22	32	(Italy) Lorenzo Savadori	Aprilia Racing	Aprilia	1:38.062	N/A	22	8
23	42	(Spain) Álex Rins	Monster Energy Yamaha MotoGP Team	Yamaha	1:38.977	N/A	23	8
OFFICIAL MOTOGP QUALIFYING TIMES REPORT

=== Moto2 ===
Fastest session lap

Pos.	No.	Biker	Team	Constructor	Qualifying times		Final grid	Row
Pos.	No.	Biker	Team	Constructor	P1	P2	Final grid	Row
1	18	(Spain) Manuel González	Liqui Moly Dynavolt Intact GP	Kalex	Qualified in Q2	1:39.858	1	1
2	75	(Spain) Albert Arenas	ITALJET Gresini Moto2	Kalex	Qualified in Q2	1:39.890	2	1
3	81	(Australia) Senna Agius	Liqui Moly Dynavolt Intact GP	Kalex	Qualified in Q2	1:39.926	3	1
4	7	(Belgium) Barry Baltus	Fantic Racing LINO SONEGO	Kalex	Qualified in Q2	1:39.935	4	2
5	10	(Brazil) Diogo Moreira	Italtrans Racing Team	Kalex	Qualified in Q2	1:39.956	5	2
6	53	(Turkey) Deniz Öncü	Red Bull KTM Ajo	Kalex	Qualified in Q2	1:40.055	6	2
7	44	(Spain) Arón Canet	Fantic Racing LINO SONEGO	Kalex	Qualified in Q2	1:40.151	7	3
8	80	(Colombia) David Alonso	CFMOTO Inde Aspar Team	Kalex	Qualified in Q2	1:40.241	8	3
9	96	(United Kingdom) Jake Dixon	ELF Marc VDS Racing Team	Boscoscuro	Qualified in Q2	1:40.276	9	3
10	12	(Czech Republic) Filip Salač	ELF Marc VDS Racing Team	Boscoscuro	Qualified in Q2	1:40.303	10	4
11	27	(Spain) Daniel Holgado	CFMOTO Inde Aspar Team	Kalex	Qualified in Q2	1:40.323	11	4
12	13	(Italy) Celestino Vietti	Team HDR Heidrun	Boscoscuro	Qualified in Q2	1:40.484	12	4
13	21	(Spain) Alonso López	Team HDR Heidrun	Boscoscuro	Qualified in Q2	1:40.492	13	5
14	28	(Spain) Izan Guevara	BLU CRU Pramac Yamaha Moto2	Boscoscuro	1:40.322	1:40.554	14	5
15	84	(Netherlands) Zonta van den Goorbergh	RW - Idrofoglia Racing GP	Kalex	1:40.349	1:40.668	15	5
16	16	(United States) Joe Roberts	OnlyFans American Racing Team	Kalex	Qualified in Q2	1:40.743	16	6
17	95	(Netherlands) Collin Veijer	Red Bull KTM Ajo	Kalex	1:40.480	1:40.922	17	6
18	4	(Spain) Iván Ortolá	QJMOTOR - FRINSA - MSI	Boscoscuro	1:40.499	1:40.967	18	6
19	11	(Spain) Álex Escrig	KLINT Forward Factory Team	Forward	1:40.508	N/A	19	7
20	15	(South Africa) Darryn Binder	ITALJET Gresini Moto2	Kalex	1:40.548	N/A	20	7
21	24	(Spain) Marcos Ramírez	OnlyFans American Racing Team	Kalex	1:40.636	N/A	21	7
22	92	(Japan) Yuki Kunii	Idemitsu Honda Team Asia	Kalex	1:40.666	N/A	22	8
23	99	(Spain) Adrián Huertas	Italtrans Racing Team	Kalex	1:40.838	N/A	23	8
24	14	(Italy) Tony Arbolino	BLU CRU Pramac Yamaha Moto2	Boscoscuro	1:40.961	N/A	24	8
25	64	(Indonesia) Mario Aji	Idemitsu Honda Team Asia	Kalex	1:41.002	N/A		
26	9	(Spain) Jorge Navarro	KLINT Forward Factory Team	Forward	1:41.050	N/A	25	9
27	66	(Spain) Sergio García	QJMOTOR - FRINSA - MSI	Boscoscuro	1:41.281	N/A	26	9
NC	71	(Japan) Ayumu Sasaki	RW - Idrofoglia Racing GP	Kalex	No time	N/A	27	9
OFFICIAL MOTO2 QUALIFYING TIMES REPORT

=== Moto3 ===
Fastest session lap

Pos.	No.	Biker	Team	Constructor	Qualifying times		Final grid	Row
Pos.	No.	Biker	Team	Constructor	P1	P2	Final grid	Row
1	99	(Spain) José Antonio Rueda	Red Bull KTM Ajo	KTM	Qualified in Q2	1:43.755	1	1
2	66	(Australia) Joel Kelso	LEVELUP-MTA	KTM	Qualified in Q2	1:44.042	2	1
3	64	(Spain) David Muñoz	Liqui Moly Dynavolt Intact GP	KTM	Qualified in Q2	1:44.165	3	1
4	36	(Spain) Ángel Piqueras	FRINSA - MT Helmets - MSI	KTM	Qualified in Q2	1:44.180	4	2
5	83	(Spain) Álvaro Carpe	Red Bull KTM Ajo	KTM	Qualified in Q2	1:44.207	5	2
6	6	(Japan) Ryusei Yamanaka	FRINSA - MT Helmets - MSI	KTM	Qualified in Q2	1:44.247	6	2
7	31	(Spain) Adrián Fernández	Leopard Racing	Honda	Qualified in Q2	1:44.511	7	3
8	12	(Australia) Jacob Roulstone	Red Bull KTM Tech3	KTM	Qualified in Q2	1:44.524	8	3
9	72	(Japan) Taiyo Furusato	Honda Team Asia	Honda	Qualified in Q2	1:44.699	9	3
10	73	(Argentina) Valentín Perrone	Red Bull KTM Tech3	KTM	Qualified in Q2	1:44.787	10	4
11	32	(Spain) Vicente Pérez	LEVELUP-MTA	KTM	1:45.549	1:44.848	11	4
12	94	(Italy) Guido Pini	Liqui Moly Dynavolt Intact GP	KTM	Qualified in Q2	1:44.921	12	4
13	58	(Italy) Luca Lunetta	SIC58 Squadra Corse	Honda	1:45.086	1:45.055	13	5
14	78	(Spain) Joel Esteban	Red Bull KTM Tech3	KTM	Qualified in Q2	1:45.115	14	5
15	21	(South Africa) Ruche Moodley	DENSSI Racing - BOE	KTM	Qualified in Q2	1:45.179	15	5
16	71	(Italy) Dennis Foggia	CFMOTO Gaviota Aspar Team	KTM	1:45.458	1:45.209	16	6
17	14	(New Zealand) Cormac Buchanan	DENSSI Racing - BOE	KTM	1:45.483	1:45.588	17	6
18	55	(Switzerland) Noah Dettwiler	CIP Green Power	KTM	Qualified in Q2	1:46.223	18	6
19	82	(Italy) Stefano Nepa	SIC58 Squadra Corse	Honda	1:45.553	N/A	19	7
20	5	(Thailand) Tatchakorn Buasri	Honda Team Asia	Honda	1:45.580	N/A	20	7
21	22	(Spain) David Almansa	Leopard Racing	Honda	1:45.585	N/A	21	7
22	54	(Italy) Riccardo Rossi	Rivacold Snipers Team	Honda	1:45.685	N/A	22	8
23	11	(Spain) Adrián Cruces	GRYD - Mlav Racing	Honda	1:45.815	N/A	23	8
24	19	(United Kingdom) Scott Ogden	CIP Green Power	KTM	1:45.824	N/A	24	8
NC	10	(Italy) Nicola Carraro	Rivacold Snipers Team	Honda	No time	N/A	25	9
NC	8	(United Kingdom) Eddie O'Shea	GRYD - Mlav Racing	Honda	No time	N/A	26	9
OFFICIAL MOTO3 QUALIFYING TIMES REPORT

== MotoGP Sprint ==
The MotoGP Sprint was held on 26 April 2025.

Pos.	No.	Rider	Team	Manufacturer	Laps	Time/Retired	Grid	Points
1	93	(Spain) Marc Márquez	Ducati Lenovo Team	Ducati	12	19:32.107	2	12
2	73	(Spain) Álex Márquez	BK8 Gresini Racing MotoGP	Ducati	12	+1.001	4	9
3	63	(Italy) Francesco Bagnaia	Ducati Lenovo Team	Ducati	12	+3.077	3	7
4	21	(Italy) Franco Morbidelli	Pertamina Enduro VR46 Racing Team	Ducati	12	+3.530	5	6
5	54	(Spain) Fermín Aldeguer	BK8 Gresini Racing MotoGP	Ducati	12	+5.791	7	5
6	49	(Italy) Fabio Di Giannantonio	Pertamina Enduro VR46 Racing Team	Ducati	12	+7.691	8	4
7	12	(Spain) Maverick Viñales	Red Bull KTM Tech3	KTM	12	+7.849	6	3
8	72	(Italy) Marco Bezzecchi	Aprilia Racing	Aprilia	12	+10.175	11	2
9	36	(Spain) Joan Mir	Honda HRC Castrol	Honda	12	+10.414	9	1
10	37	(Spain) Pedro Acosta	Red Bull KTM Factory Racing	KTM	12	+12.673	12	
11	33	(South Africa) Brad Binder	Red Bull KTM Factory Racing	KTM	12	+13.204	13	
12	79	(Japan) Ai Ogura	Trackhouse MotoGP Team	Aprilia	12	+13.438	15	
13	10	(Italy) Luca Marini	Honda HRC Castrol	Honda	12	+16.572	16	
14	23	(Italy) Enea Bastianini	Red Bull KTM Tech3	KTM	12	+17.918	18	
15	42	(Spain) Álex Rins	Monster Energy Yamaha MotoGP Team	Yamaha	12	+19.963	23	
16	25	(Spain) Raúl Fernández	Trackhouse MotoGP Team	Aprilia	12	+21.690	17	
17	7	(Spain) Augusto Fernández	Prima Pramac Yamaha MotoGP	Yamaha	12	+21.932	20	
18	41	(Spain) Aleix Espargaró	Honda HRC Test Team	Honda	12	+22.515	19	
19	32	(Italy) Lorenzo Savadori	Aprilia Racing	Aprilia	12	+30.200	22	
20	35	(Thailand) Somkiat Chantra	IDEMITSU Honda LCR	Honda	12	+30.968	21	
Ret	5	(France) Johann Zarco	Castrol Honda LCR	Honda	5	Crashed out	10	
Ret	43	(Australia) Jack Miller	Prima Pramac Yamaha MotoGP	Yamaha	4	Crashed out	14	
Ret	20	(France) Fabio Quartararo	Monster Energy Yamaha MotoGP Team	Yamaha	1	Crashed out	1	
Fastest sprint lap: (Spain) Marc Márquez (Ducati) – 1:36.665 (lap 3)
OFFICIAL MOTOGP SPRINT REPORT

== Warm Up ==
=== Warm Up MotoGP ===
Pos.	No.	Biker	Constructor	
Pos.	No.	Biker	Constructor	Time results
1	93	(Spain) Marc Márquez	Ducati	1:37.069
2	73	(Spain) Álex Márquez	Ducati	1:37.113
3	20	(France) Fabio Quartararo	Yamaha	1:37.206
4	63	(Italy) Francesco Bagnaia	Ducati	1:37.376
5	12	(Spain) Maverick Viñales	KTM	1:37.435
6	49	(Italy) Fabio Di Giannantonio	Ducati	1:37.439
7	21	(Italy) Franco Morbidelli	Ducati	1:37.529
8	54	(Spain) Fermín Aldeguer	Ducati	1:37.543
9	36	(Spain) Joan Mir	Honda	1:37.582
10	72	(Italy) Marco Bezzecchi	Aprilia	1:37.653
11	37	(Spain) Pedro Acosta	KTM	1:37.665
12	43	(Australia) Jack Miller	Yamaha	1:37.752
13	33	(South Africa) Brad Binder	KTM	1:37.777
14	25	(Spain) Raúl Fernández	Aprilia	1:37.842
15	10	(Italy) Luca Marini	Honda	1:37.907
16	5	(France) Johann Zarco	Honda	1:37.939
17	23	(Italy) Enea Bastianini	KTM	1:38.046
18	79	(Japan) Ai Ogura	Aprilia	1:38.047
19	41	(Spain) Aleix Espargaró	Honda	1:38.464
20	42	(Spain) Álex Rins	Yamaha	1:38.548
22	32	(Italy) Lorenzo Savadori	Aprilia	1:39.579
23	35	(Thailand) Somkiat Chantra	Honda	1:39.584
OFFICIAL MOTOGP WARM UP TIMES REPORT

== Race ==
=== MotoGP ===
Pos.	No.	Rider	Team	Manufacturer	Laps	Time/Retired	Grid	Points
1	73	(Spain) Álex Márquez	BK8 Gresini Racing MotoGP	Ducati	25	40:56.374	4	25
2	20	(France) Fabio Quartararo	Monster Energy Yamaha MotoGP Team	Yamaha	25	+1.561	1	20
3	63	(Italy) Francesco Bagnaia	Ducati Lenovo Team	Ducati	25	+2.217	3	16
4	12	(Spain) Maverick Viñales	Red Bull KTM Tech3	KTM	25	+3.678	6	13
5	49	(Italy) Fabio Di Giannantonio	Pertamina Enduro VR46 Racing Team	Ducati	25	+7.267	8	11
6	33	(South Africa) Brad Binder	Red Bull KTM Factory Racing	KTM	25	+8.529	13	10
7	37	(Spain) Pedro Acosta	Red Bull KTM Factory Racing	KTM	25	+9.764	12	9
8	79	(Japan) Ai Ogura	Trackhouse MotoGP Team	Aprilia	25	+10.923	15	8
9	23	(Italy) Enea Bastianini	Red Bull KTM Tech3	KTM	25	+15.879	18	7
10	10	(Italy) Luca Marini	Honda HRC Castrol	Honda	25	+17.239	16	6
11	5	(France) Johann Zarco	Castrol Honda LCR	Honda	25	+17.784	10	5
12	93	(Spain) Marc Márquez	Ducati Lenovo Team	Ducati	25	+20.890	2	4
13	42	(Spain) Álex Rins	Monster Energy Yamaha MotoGP Team	Yamaha	25	+21.120	23	3
14	72	(Italy) Marco Bezzecchi	Aprilia Racing	Aprilia	25	+24.510	11	2
15	25	(Spain) Raúl Fernández	Trackhouse MotoGP Team	Aprilia	25	+25.726	17	1
16	7	(Spain) Augusto Fernández	Prima Pramac Yamaha MotoGP	Yamaha	25	+31.429	20	
17	41	(Spain) Aleix Espargaró	Honda HRC Test Team	Honda	25	+39.678 (Note: 16-second penalty for technical regulations infringement.)	19	
18	32	(Italy) Lorenzo Savadori	Aprilia Racing	Aprilia	25	+49.303	22	
Ret	54	(Spain) Fermín Aldeguer	BK8 Gresini Racing MotoGP	Ducati	18	Retired after crash	7	
Ret	21	(Italy) Franco Morbidelli	Pertamina Enduro VR46 Racing Team	Ducati	15	Crashed out	5	
Ret	36	(Spain) Joan Mir	Honda HRC Castrol	Honda	14	Crashed out	9	
Ret	43	(Australia) Jack Miller	Prima Pramac Yamaha MotoGP	Yamaha	13	Technical	14	
Ret	35	(Thailand) Somkiat Chantra	Idemitsu Honda LCR	Honda	11	Injury	21	
Fastest lap: (Spain) Álex Márquez (Ducati) - 1:37.349 (lap 4)
OFFICIAL MOTOGP RACE REPORT

=== Moto2 ===
Pos.	No.	Rider	Team	Manufacturer	Laps	Time/Retired	Grid	Points
1	18	(Spain) Manuel González	Liqui Moly Dynavolt Intact GP	Kalex	21	35:30.634	1	25
2	7	(Belgium) Barry Baltus	Fantic Racing Lino Sonego	Kalex	21	+2.256	4	20
3	81	(Australia) Senna Agius	Liqui Moly Dynavolt Intact GP	Kalex	21	+3.781	3	16
4	10	(Brazil) Diogo Moreira	Italtrans Racing Team	Kalex	21	+4.781	5	13
5	53	(Turkey) Deniz Öncü	Red Bull KTM Ajo	Kalex	21	+6.390	6	11
6	75	(Spain) Albert Arenas	Italjet Gresini Moto2	Kalex	21	+7.049	2	10
7	13	(Italy) Celestino Vietti	Beta Tools SpeedRS Team	Boscoscuro	21	+7.919	12	9
8	44	(Spain) Arón Canet	Fantic Racing Lino Sonego	Kalex	21	+8.511	7	8
9	96	(United Kingdom) Jake Dixon	Elf Marc VDS Racing Team	Boscoscuro	21	+12.537	9	7
10	12	(Czech Republic) Filip Salač	Elf Marc VDS Racing Team	Boscoscuro	21	+14.783	10	6
11	16	(United States) Joe Roberts	OnlyFans American Racing Team	Kalex	21	+17.135	16	5
12	24	(Spain) Marcos Ramírez	OnlyFans American Racing Team	Kalex	21	+17.182	21	4
13	99	(Spain) Adrián Huertas	Italtrans Racing Team	Kalex	21	+20.992	23	3
14	95	(Netherlands) Collin Veijer	Red Bull KTM Ajo	Kalex	21	+23.062	17	2
15	14	(Italy) Tony Arbolino	Blu Cru Pramac Yamaha Moto2	Boscoscuro	21	+27.942	24	1
16	92	(Japan) Yuki Kunii	Idemitsu Honda Team Asia	Kalex	21	+28.588	22	
17	11	(Spain) Álex Escrig	Klint Forward Factory Team	Forward	21	+29.790	19	
18	4	(Spain) Iván Ortolá	QJMotor – Frinsa – MSi	Boscoscuro	18	+31.343	18	
19	15	(South Africa) Darryn Binder	Italjet Gresini Moto2	Kalex	21	+31.453	20	
20	84	(Netherlands) Zonta van den Goorbergh	RW-Idrofoglia Racing GP	Kalex	21	+31.651	15	
21	9	(Spain) Jorge Navarro	Klint Forward Factory Team	Forward	21	+36.443	25	
22	3	(Spain) Sergio García	QJMotor – Frinsa – MSi	Boscoscuro	21	+37.249	26	
Ret	71	(Japan) Ayumu Sasaki	RW-Idrofoglia Racing GP	Kalex	11	Crashed out	27	
Ret	28	(Spain) Izan Guevara	Blu Cru Pramac Yamaha Moto2	Boscoscuro	4	Crashed out	14	
Ret	80	(Colombia) David Alonso	CFMoto Gaviota Aspar Team	Kalex	4	Crashed out	8	
Ret	27	(Spain) Daniel Holgado	CFMoto Gaviota Aspar Team	Kalex	0	Crashed out	11	
DSQ	21	(Spain) Alonso López	Team HDR Heidrun	Boscoscuro		Black flag (Note: Black flag due to irresponsible riding.)	13	
DNS	64	(Indonesia) Mario Aji	Idemitsu Honda Team Asia	Kalex		Injury	25	
Fastest lap: (Spain) Manuel González (Kalex) - 1:40.351 (lap 3)
OFFICIAL MOTO2 RACE REPORT

=== Moto3 ===
Pos.	No.	Rider	Team	Manufacturer	Laps	Time/Retired	Grid	Points
1	99	(Spain) José Antonio Rueda	Red Bull KTM Ajo	KTM	19	33:17.979	1	25
2	36	(Spain) Ángel Piqueras	Frinsa – MT Helmets – MSI	KTM	19	+4.334	3	20
3	66	(Australia) Joel Kelso	LevelUp – MTA	KTM	19	+4.486	2	16
4	31	(Spain) Adrián Fernández	Leopard Racing	Honda	19	+6.308	6	13
5	6	(Japan) Ryusei Yamanaka	Frinsa – MT Helmets – MSI	KTM	19	+6.409	5	11
6	72	(Japan) Taiyo Furusato	Honda Team Asia	Honda	19	+6.494	8	10
7	94	(Italy) Guido Pini	Liqui Moly Dynavolt Intact GP	KTM	19	+6.588	11	9
8	83	(Spain) Álvaro Carpe	Red Bull KTM Ajo	KTM	19	+8.007	4	8
9	12	(Australia) Jacob Roulstone	Red Bull KTM Tech3	KTM	19	+21.703	7	7
10	73	(Argentina) Valentín Perrone	Red Bull KTM Tech3	KTM	19	+21.795	9	6
11	58	(Italy) Luca Lunetta	Sic58 Squadra Corse	Honda	19	+21.900	12	5
12	19	(United Kingdom) Scott Ogden	CIP Green Power	KTM	19	+22.117	23	4
13	71	(Italy) Dennis Foggia	CFMoto Gaviota Aspar Team	KTM	19	+30.583	15	3
14	82	(Italy) Stefano Nepa	Sic58 Squadra Corse	Honda	19	+31.831	18	2
15	5	(Thailand) Tatchakorn Buasri	Honda Team Asia	Honda	19	+37.469	19	1
16	55	(Switzerland) Noah Dettwiler	CIP Green Power	KTM	19	+37.541	17	
17	11	(Spain) Adrián Cruces	GRYD - Mlav Racing	Honda	19	+42.816	22	
18	32	(Spain) Vicente Pérez	LEVEL UP - MTA	KTM	19	+59.300	10	
19	14	(New Zealand) Cormac Buchanan	Denssi Racing – Boé	KTM	18	+1 lap	16	
Ret	8	(United Kingdom) Eddie O'Shea	Gryd – MLav Racing	Honda	17	Crashed out	25	
Ret	10	(Italy) Nicola Carraro	Rivacold Snipers Team	Honda	10	Crashed out	24	
Ret	64	(Spain) David Muñoz	Liqui Moly Dynavolt Intact GP	KTM	7	Retired after crash	26	
Ret	78	(Spain) Joel Esteban	Red Bull KTM Tech3	KTM	1	Crashed out	13	
Ret	54	(Italy) Riccardo Rossi	Rivacold Snipers Team	Honda	1	Crashed out	21	
Ret	21	(South Africa) Ruché Moodley	Denssi Racing – Boé	KTM	0	Crashed out	14	
Ret	22	(Spain) David Almansa	Leopard Racing	Honda	0	Crashed out	20	
Fastest lap: (Spain) José Antonio Rueda (KTM) - 1:44.352 (lap 12)
OFFICIAL MOTO3 RACE REPORT

== Championship standings after the race ==
Below are the standings for the top five riders, constructors, and teams after the round.

=== MotoGP ===
Riders' Championship standings

	Pos.	Rider	Points
1	1	(Spain) Álex Márquez	140
1	2	(Spain) Marc Márquez	139
	3	(Italy) Francesco Bagnaia	120
	4	(Italy) Franco Morbidelli	84
	5	(Italy) Fabio Di Giannantonio	63

Constructors' Championship standings

	Pos.	Constructor	Points
	1	(Italy) Ducati	185
3	2	(Japan) Yamaha	62
1	3	(Austria) KTM	58
2	4	(Japan) Honda	56
2	5	(Italy) Aprilia	53

Teams' Championship standings

	Pos.	Team	Points
	1	(Italy) Ducati Lenovo Team	259
	2	(Italy) BK8 Gresini Racing MotoGP	165
	3	(Italy) Pertamina Enduro VR46 Racing Team	147
1	4	(Japan) Monster Energy Yamaha MotoGP Team	67
1	5	(Austria) Red Bull KTM Factory Racing	65

=== Moto2 ===
Riders' Championship standings

	Pos.	Rider	Points
1	1	(Spain) Manuel González	86
1	2	(Spain) Arón Canet	79
	3	(United Kingdom) Jake Dixon	66
2	4	(Belgium) Barry Baltus	53
1	5	(Spain) Marcos Ramírez	39

Constructors' Championship standings

Pos.	Constructor	Points
1	(Germany) Kalex	108
2	(Italy) Boscoscuro	77
3	(Switzerland) Forward	10

Teams' Championship standings

	Pos.	Team	Points
	1	(Italy) Fantic Racing Lino Sonego	132
1	2	(Germany) Liqui Moly Dynavolt Intact GP	123
1	3	(Belgium) Elf Marc VDS Racing Team	85
	4	(Italy) Beta Tools SpeedRS Team	64
3	5	(Finland) Red Bull KTM Ajo	48

=== Moto3 ===
Riders' Championship standings

	Pos.	Rider	Points
1	1	(Spain) José Antonio Rueda	91
1	2	(Spain) Ángel Piqueras	87
	3	(Australia) Joel Kelso	57
	4	(Spain) Adrián Fernández	53
1	5	(Japan) Taiyo Furusato	48

Constructors' Championship standings

Pos.	Constructor	Points
1	(Austria) KTM	125
2	(Japan) Honda	76

Teams' Championship standings

Pos.	Team	Points
1	(Finland) Red Bull KTM Ajo	134
2	(Spain) Frinsa – MT Helmets – MSi	121
3	(Italy) LevelUp – MTA	97
4	(Luxembourg) Leopard Racing	75
5	(Italy) Sic58 Squadra Corse	58

== Notes ==
Previous race: 2025 Qatar Grand Prix	FIM Grand Prix World Championship; 2025 season	Next race: 2025 French Grand Prix
Previous race: 2024 Spanish Grand Prix	Spanish motorcycle Grand Prix	Next race: 2026 Spanish Grand Prix
