= Jacob Roulstone =

Australian motorcycle racer

- Roulstone at the 2026 Czech Grand Prix
- Nationality: Australian
- Born: 4 February 2005 (age 21); Jamberoo, New South Wales, Australia
- Current team: Idemitsu Honda Team Asia
- Bike number: 22
Motorcycle racing career statistics
Moto2 World Championship
Active years	2026
Manufacturers	Kalex (2026); Boscoscuro (2026)
Starts / Wins / Podiums / Poles / F. laps / Points; 4 / 0 / 0 / 0 / 0 / 0
Moto3 World Championship
Active years	2024–2025
Manufacturers	GasGas (2024); KTM (2025)
Championships	0
2024 championship position	15th
Starts / Wins / Podiums / Poles / F. laps / Points; 37 / 0 / 0 / 0 / 0 / 127

Jacob Roulstone (born 4 February 2005) is an Australian Grand Prix motorcycle racer. He competed for Tech3 Racing in the Moto3 World Championship in 2024 and 2025.

== Career ==
=== Early career ===
Roulstone was born in Jamberoo, Australia. He started riding dirt bikes from a young age but eventually switched to road.

Throughout 2015 to 2018, Roulstone won many titles in track racing across various junior series, including the 2015 Casey Stoner Cup, the 2016 Troy Bayliss Classic Championship, three Australian Junior Dirt Track Championship from 2016 to 2018 and five NSW Junior Dirt Track State Championship Runner-Up trophies.

Roulstone was selected to participate in the 2019 Asia Talent Cup season, at the age of 14. He managed to stay in the points consistently and clinched three top-ten finishes.

For 2020, Roulstone joined the European Talent Cup, where he would spend the next two years. In his second season in 2021, he won the opening race in Estoril and earned two more podiums in the last round in Valencia. These results secured him a spot in the FIM JuniorGP and Red Bull MotoGP Rookies Cup for 2022 and 2023.

In 2022, Roulstone slowly adapted to both new categories, scoring points consistently in the second half of the year. He had a much stronger 2023 season, where he scored two podiums in both JuniorGP and Red Bull MotoGP Rookies Cup championships, finishing seventh and fifth at the end of the year, respectively.

On 24 September 2023, it was announced that Roulstone would be making his Grand Prix debut in the 2024 Moto3 World Championship with Tech3 Racing, partnering Daniel Holgado.

=== Moto3 World Championship ===
Roulstone had a consistent first year in the World Championship, scoring points in many races and achieving several top 10 finishes. Midway through the season, he signed for another year with Tech3. He finished 15th in the final standings.

During pre-season training in January 2025, Roulstone fractured his vertebrae in Jerez, which made him miss the first two rounds in Thailand and Argentina.

== Career statistics ==
=== Asia Talent Cup ===
==== Races by year ====
(key) (Races in bold indicate pole position; races in italics indicate fastest lap)

Year	Bike	1		2		3		4		5		6		Pos	Pts
Year	Bike	R1	R2	R1	R2	R1	R2	R1	R2	R1	R2	R1	R2	Pos	Pts
2019	Honda	QAT; 15	QAT; 15	THA; 14	THA; 11	MAL; 18	MAL; 13	CHA; 6	CHA; 5	JPN; Ret	JPN; 10	SEP; C	SEP; 5	11th	54

=== European Talent Cup ===
==== Races by year ====
(key) (Races in bold indicate pole position; races in italics indicate fastest lap)

Year	Bike	1	2	3	4	5	6	7	8	9	10	11	12	Pos	Pts
2020	Honda	EST; 11	EST; 16	ALG; 23	JER; 18	JER; 16	JER; 16	ARA; 9	ARA; 11	ARA; 18	VAL; 7	VAL; 15		17th	27
2021	Honda	EST; 1	EST; Ret	VAL; 12	VAL; 6	CAT; 29	POR; 17	ARA; 14	ARA; C	JER; 11	JER; Ret	VAL; 2	VAL; 3	9th	82

=== Red Bull MotoGP Rookies Cup ===
==== Races by year ====
(key) (Races in bold indicate pole position, races in italics indicate fastest lap)

Year	Bike	1		2		3		4		5		6		7		Pos	Pts
Year	Bike	R1	R2	R1	R2	R1	R2	R1	R2	R1	R2	R1	R2	R1	R2	Pos	Pts
2022	KTM	POR; 7	POR; Ret	JER; 20	JER; 24	MUG; 16	MUG; 20	SAC; 19	SAC; 20	RBR; 15	RBR; 17	ARA; 13	ARA; 17	VAL; 13	VAL; 15	21st	17
2023	KTM	POR; 13	POR; 9	JER; 2	JER; 6	LMS; 11	LMS; 6	MUG; 7	MUG; 9	ASS; 4	ASS; 3	RBR; Ret	RBR; 7	MIS; 6	MIS; 10	5th	125

=== FIM JuniorGP World Championship ===
==== Races by year ====
(key) (Races in bold indicate pole position) (Races in italics indicate fastest lap)

Year	Bike	1	2	3	4	5	6	7	8	9	10	11	12	Pos	Pts
2022	GasGas	EST; 21	VAL1; 18	VAL2; 23	CAT1; 26	CAT2; 16	JER1; 21	JER1; Ret	POR; 17	RSM; 19	ARA; 14	RIC1; 13	RIC2; 11	25th	10
2023	Gas Gas	EST; 5	VAL1; 4	VAL2; 2	JER1; 6	JER2; 5	ALG1; 9	ALG2; 15	BAR1; 2	BAR2; Ret	ARA; Ret	VAL3; 9	VAL4; 6	7th	110

=== FIM Moto2 European Championship ===
==== Races by year ====
(key) (Races in bold indicate pole position; races in italics indicate fastest lap)

Year	Bike	1	2	3	4	5	6	7	8	9	10	11	Pos	Pts
2026	Boscoscuro	CAT1; 7	CAT2; 7	EST1; Ret	EST2; Ret	JER; 5	MAG1; 12	MAG2; 10	VAL; Ret	ARA1; 5	ARA2; 3	MIS; Ret	10th	66

=== Grand Prix motorcycle racing ===
==== By season ====
Season	Class	Motorcycle	Team	Race	Win	Podium	Pole	FLap	Pts	Plcd
2024	Moto3	GasGas	Red Bull GasGas Tech3	20	0	0	0	0	66	15th
2025	Moto3	KTM	Red Bull KTM Tech3	17	0	0	0	0	61	15th
2026	Moto2	Kalex	Idemitsu Honda Team Asia	3	0	0	0	0	0*	33rd*
2026	Moto2	Boscoscuro	Elf Marc VDS Racing Team	1	0	0	0	0	0*	33rd*
Total				**41**	**0**	**0**	**0**	**0**	**127**	

==== By class ====
Class	Seasons	1st GP	1st pod	1st win	Race	Win	Podiums	Pole	FLap	Pts	WChmp
Moto3	2024–2025	2024 Qatar			37	0	0	0	0	127	0
Moto2	2026	2026 Hungarian			4	0	0	0	0	0*	0
Total	2024–present				**41**	**0**	**0**	**0**	**0**	**127**	**0**

==== Races by year ====
(key) (Races in bold indicate pole position; races in italics indicate fastest lap)

Year	Class	Bike	1	2	3	4	5	6	7	8	9	10	11	12	13	14	15	16	17	18	19	20	21	22	Pos	Pts
2024	Moto3	GasGas	QAT; 10	POR; 11	AME; 8	SPA; 12	FRA; 12	CAT; 8	ITA; 9	NED; 14	GER; Ret	GBR; 17	AUT; 14	ARA; 21	RSM; 12	EMI; 21	INA; 16	JPN; 17	AUS; 13	THA; 15	MAL; 12	SLD; 8			15th	66
2025	Moto3	KTM	THA	ARG	AME; 14	QAT; 14	SPA; 9	FRA; 13	GBR; 13	ARA; Ret	ITA; 13	NED; 12	GER; 8	CZE; 14	AUT; 14	HUN; 10	CAT; Ret	RSM; 11	JPN; 13	INA; 5	AUS; Ret	MAL; DNS	POR	VAL; 16	16th	61
2026	Moto2	Kalex	THA	BRA	USA	SPA	FRA	CAT	ITA	HUN; 22	CZE; 24	NED; 22	GER	GBR	ARA	RSM	AUT	JPN	INA	AUS					33rd*	0*
2026	Moto2	Boscoscuro																			MAL; Ret	QAT	POR	VAL	33rd*	0*

* Season still in progress.
