= Adrián Fernández (motorcyclist) =

Spanish motorcycle racer

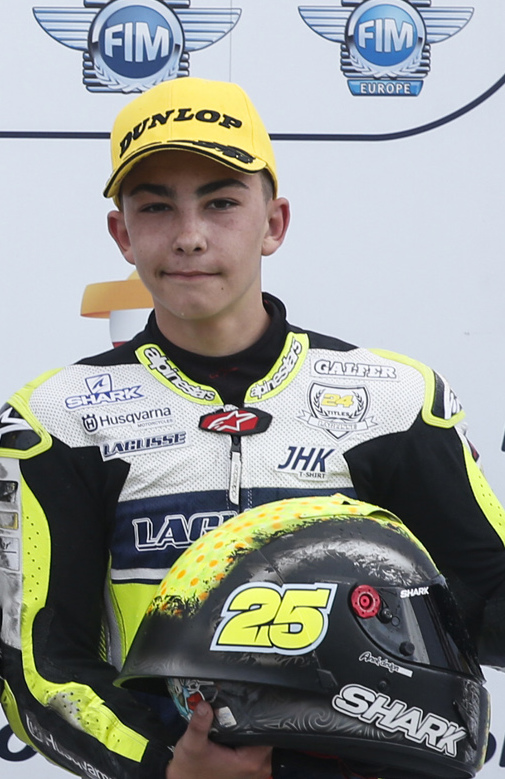
- Fernández in 2019
- Nationality: Spanish
- Born: 31 January 2004 (age 22); Madrid, Spain
- Current team: Leopard Racing
- Bike number: 31
Motorcycle racing career statistics
Moto3 World Championship
Active years	2020–
Manufacturers	Honda, Husqvarna, KTM
2025 championship position	7th (179 pts)
Starts / Wins / Podiums / Poles / F. laps / Points; 105 / 1 / 10 / 4 / 3 / 620
Supersport World Championship
Active years	2023
Manufacturers	Yamaha
2023 championship position	46th (1 pts)
Starts / Wins / Podiums / Poles / F. laps / Points; 2 / 0 / 0 / 0 / 0 / 1

Adrián Fernández González (born 31 January 2004) is a Spanish motorcycle racer. His older brother, Raúl, is also a motorcycle racer for Trackhouse Racing in the MotoGP class. They are not related to MotoGP rider Augusto Fernández. Fernández was the 2016 Spanish 80cc champion.

== Career ==
=== Moto3 World Championship (2020–) ===
==== Return to Red Bull KTM Tech3 (2027) ====
Fernández will return to Red Bull KTM Tech3 for the 2027 alongside Kristian Daniel Jr.

== Career statistics ==
=== European Talent Cup ===
==== Races by year ====
(key) (Races in bold indicate pole position, races in italics indicate fastest lap)

Year	Bike	1	2	3	4	5	6	7	8	9	10	11	Pos	Pts
2017	Honda	ALB1	ALB2	CAT	VAL1	EST1; 17	EST2; 13	JER1; 13	JER2; 11	ARA1; Ret	ARA2; 12	VAL2; 4	17th	28
2018	Honda	EST1; 11	EST2; 10	VAL1; 4	VAL2; 5	CAT; Ret	ARA1; 6	ARA2; Ret	JER1; 4	JER2; Ret	ALB; 6	VAL; 3	6th	84

=== FIM CEV Moto3 Junior World Championship ===
==== Races by year ====
(key) (Races in bold indicate pole position, races in italics indicate fastest lap)

Year	Bike	1	2	3	4	5	6	7	8	9	10	11	12	Pos	Pts
2019	Husqvarna	EST; Ret	VAL1; 11	VAL2; 12	FRA; 9	CAT1; 11	CAT2; Ret	ARA; 15	JER1; 9	JER2; 12	ALB; 8	VAL1; 11	VAL2; 3	9th	63
2020	Husqvarna	EST; 3	POR; 6	JER1; Ret	JER2; 5	JER3; 26	ARA1; 7	ARA2; 6	ARA3; Ret	VAL1; 7	VAL2; 8	VAL3; 10		7th	79

=== Grand Prix motorcycle racing ===
==== By season ====
Season	Class	Motorcycle	Team	Race	Win	Podium	Pole	FLap	Pts	Plcd
2020	Moto3	Honda	Rivacold Snipers Team	1	0	0	0	0	0	31st
2021	Moto3	Husqvarna	Sterilgarda Max Racing Team	18	0	0	0	0	30	22nd
2022	Moto3	KTM	Red Bull KTM Tech3	19	0	0	0	0	51	20th
2023	Moto3	Honda	Leopard Racing	8	0	0	0	0	25	22nd
2024	Moto3	Honda	Leopard Racing	20	0	3	1	2	158	6th
2025	Moto3	Honda	Leopard Racing	20	1	4	2	0	179	7th
2026	Moto3	Honda	Leopard Racing	19	0	3	1	1	177*	5th*
Total				**105**	**1**	**10**	**4**	**3**	**620**	

==== By class ====
Class	Seasons	1st GP	1st pod	1st win	Race	Win	Podiums	Pole	FLap	Pts	WChmp
Moto3	2020–present	2020 Portugal	2024 Indonesia	2025 Valencia	105	1	10	4	3	620	0
Total	2020–present				**105**	**1**	**10**	**4**	**3**	**620**	**0**

==== Races by year ====
(key) (Races in bold indicate pole position; races in italics indicate fastest lap)

Year	Class	Bike	1	2	3	4	5	6	7	8	9	10	11	12	13	14	15	16	17	18	19	20	21	22	Pos	Pts
2020	Moto3	Honda	QAT	SPA	ANC	CZE	AUT	STY	RSM	EMI	CAT	FRA	ARA	TER	EUR	VAL	POR; 18								31st	0
2021	Moto3	Husqvarna	QAT; 17	DOH; Ret	POR; Ret	SPA; 24	FRA; 6	ITA; Ret	CAT; Ret	GER; Ret	NED; Ret	STY; 10	AUT; Ret	GBR; 19	ARA; 12	RSM; 20	AME; 21	EMI; 13	ALR; 11	VAL; 14					22nd	30
2022	Moto3	KTM	QAT; 14	INA; Ret	ARG; 13	AME; 14	POR; WD	SPA; Ret	FRA; 20	ITA; 10	CAT; 9	GER; 8	NED; Ret	GBR; 15	AUT; 17	RSM; 16	ARA; 5	JPN; 18	THA; Ret	AUS; 18	MAL; 15	VAL; 6			20th	51
2023	Moto3	Honda	POR	ARG	AME	SPA	FRA	ITA	GER; 16	NED; Ret	GBR	AUT	CAT	RSM	IND	JPN	INA; Ret	AUS; 5	THA; 15	MAL; 5	QAT; 17	VAL; 14			22nd	25
2024	Moto3	Honda	QAT; Ret	POR; 10	AME; 11	SPA; 6	FRA; 6	CAT; 10	ITA; 8	NED; 7	GER; 4	GBR; 8	AUT; 6	ARA; 11	RSM; 13	EMI; 8	INA; 2	JPN; 3	AUS; 3	THA; 22	**MAL**; Ret	SLD; 11			6th	158
2025	Moto3	Honda	THA; 3	ARG; 2	AME; 12	QAT; Ret	SPA; 4	FRA; 8	GBR	ARA; DNS	ITA; Ret	NED; Ret	GER; Ret	CZE; 6	AUT; 8	HUN; 6	CAT; 5	RSM; 3	JPN; 5	**INA**; 6	AUS; 6	MAL; DSQ	POR; 9	**VAL**; 1	7th	179
2026	Moto3	Honda	THA; 6	BRA; 8	USA; 5	SPA; 2	**FRA**; 2	CAT; 8	ITA; 4	HUN; 10	CZE; 14	NED; 9	GER; 6	GBR; 4	ARA; 10	RSM; 14	AUT; Ret	JPN; 13	INA; 7	AUS; C	MAL; 7	QAT; 2	POR	VAL	5th*	177*

* Season still in progress.

=== Supersport World Championship ===
==== By season ====
Season	Class	Motorcycle	Team	Number	Race	Win	Podium	Pole	FLap	Pts	Plcd
2023	WSSP	Yamaha YZF-R6	Evan Bros. WorldSSP Yamaha Team	31	2	0	0	0	0	1	46th
Total					**2**	**0**	**0**	**0**	**0**	**1**	

==== Races by year ====
(key) (Races in bold indicate pole position, races in italics indicate fastest lap)

Year	Bike	1	2	3	4	5	6	7	8	9	10	11	12	13	14	15	16	17	18	19	20	21	22	23	24	Pos	Pts
2023	Yamaha	AUS	AUS	INA	INA	NED	NED	SPA; 18	SPA; 15	EMI	EMI	GBR	GBR	ITA	ITA	CZE	CZE	FRA	FRA	SPA	SPA	POR	POR	JER	JER	46th	1
