= 2025 Argentine motorcycle Grand Prix =

Motorcycle races in Termas de Río Hondo

(Argentina) 2025 Argentine Grand Prix
Race details
- Race 2 of 22 races in the 2025 Grand Prix motorcycle racing season
- Date: 16 March 2025
- Official name: Gran Premio YPF Energía de Argentina
- Location: Autódromo Termas de Río Hondo; Termas de Río Hondo, Argentina
- Course: Permanent racing facility; 4.806 km (2.986 mi)

MotoGP
Pole position
Rider	(Spain) Marc Márquez	Ducati
Time	1:36.917	
Fastest lap
Rider	(Spain) Marc Márquez	Ducati
Time	1:38.243 on lap 19	
Podium
First	(Spain) Marc Márquez	Ducati
Second	(Spain) Álex Márquez	Ducati
Third	(Italy) Franco Morbidelli	Ducati

Moto2
Pole position
Rider	(Spain) Manuel González	Kalex
Time	1:40.870	
Fastest lap
Rider	(United Kingdom) Jake Dixon	Boscoscuro
Time	1:41.639 on lap 7	
Podium
First	(United Kingdom) Jake Dixon	Boscoscuro
Second	(Spain) Manuel González	Kalex
Third	(Italy) Celestino Vietti	Boscoscuro

Moto3
Pole position
Rider	(Italy) Matteo Bertelle	KTM
Time	1:46.034	
Fastest lap
Rider	(Spain) Ángel Piqueras	KTM
Time	1:47.249 on lap 16	
Podium
First	(Spain) Ángel Piqueras	KTM
Second	(Spain) Adrián Fernández	Honda
Third	(Spain) José Antonio Rueda	KTM

The 2025 Argentine motorcycle Grand Prix (officially known as the Gran Premio YPF Energía de Argentina) was the second round of the 2025 Grand Prix motorcycle racing season. All races were held at the Autódromo Termas de Río Hondo in Termas de Río Hondo on 16 March 2025.

== Background ==
Factory Ducati rider Marc Márquez came into the round as the Riders' Championship leader on 37 points, 8 points ahead of his brother Álex Márquez in second and 14 points ahead of Francesco Bagnaia in third.

Ducati lead the Constructors' Championship by 20 points ahead of Aprilia.

Ducati Lenovo Team lead the Teams' Championship by 28 points ahead of Gresini Racing.

Reigning World Champion and factory Aprilia rider Jorge Martín missed this round due to a wrist injury, having also missed the preceding round in Thailand.

== Practice session ==
=== MotoGP ===
==== Combined Free Practice 1-2 ====
Practice times (written in bold) are the fastest times in the session.

Fastest session lap

Pos.	No.	Biker	Constructor	Practice times	
Pos.	No.	Biker	Constructor	P1	P2
1	73	(Spain) Álex Márquez	Ducati	1:39.208	1:37.795
2	93	(Spain) Marc Márquez	Ducati	1:38.937	1:37.882
3	5	(France) Johann Zarco	Honda	1:38.963	1:37.965
4	49	(Italy) Fabio Di Giannantonio	Ducati	1:40.085	1:38.017
5	37	(Spain) Pedro Acosta	KTM	1:39.928	1:38.211
6	54	(Spain) Fermín Aldeguer	Ducati	1:40.595	1:38.372
7	63	(Italy) Francesco Bagnaia	Ducati	1:40.288	1:38.396
8	72	(Italy) Marco Bezzecchi	Aprilia	1:39.582	1:38.409
9	43	(Australia) Jack Miller	Yamaha	1:39.639	1:38.409
10	20	(France) Fabio Quartararo	Yamaha	1:40.011	1:38.414
11	36	(Spain) Joan Mir	Honda	1:39.894	1:38.416
12	21	(Italy) Franco Morbidelli	Ducati	1:39.408	1:38.438
13	42	(Spain) Álex Rins	Yamaha	1:39.979	1:38.465
14	10	(Italy) Luca Marini	Honda	1:39.583	1:38.500
15	79	(Japan) Ai Ogura	Aprilia	1:40.162	1:38.614
16	88	(Portugal) Miguel Oliveira	Yamaha	1:40.772	1:38.635
17	33	(South Africa) Brad Binder	KTM	1:39.955	1:38.689
18	25	(Spain) Raúl Fernández	Aprilia	1:40.886	1:38.765
19	12	(Spain) Maverick Viñales	KTM	1:39.889	1:38.785
20	23	(Italy) Enea Bastianini	KTM	1:41.030	1:39.268
21	35	(Thailand) Somkiat Chantra	Honda	1:40.782	1:39.620
22	32	(Italy) Lorenzo Savadori	Aprilia	1:41.876	1:39.905
OFFICIAL MOTOGP COMBINED PRACTICE TIMES REPORT

==== Practice ====
The top 10 riders (written in bold) qualified for Q2.

Fastest session lap

Pos.	No.	Biker	Constructor	
Pos.	No.	Biker	Constructor	Time results
1	93	**(Spain) Marc Márquez**	**Ducati**	**1:37.295**
2	49	**(Italy) Fabio Di Giannantonio**	**Ducati**	**1:37.430**
3	73	**(Spain) Álex Márquez**	**Ducati**	**1:37.496**
4	72	**(Italy) Marco Bezzecchi**	**Aprilia**	**1:37.510**
5	33	**(South Africa) Brad Binder**	**KTM**	**1:37.546**
6	42	**(Spain) Álex Rins**	**Yamaha**	**1:37.591**
7	5	**(France) Johann Zarco**	**Honda**	**1:37.685**
8	20	**(France) Fabio Quartararo**	**Yamaha**	**1:37.818**
9	37	**(Spain) Pedro Acosta**	**KTM**	**1:37.827**
10	63	**(Italy) Francesco Bagnaia**	**Ducati**	**1:37.834**
11	79	(Japan) Ai Ogura	Aprilia	1:37.855
12	21	(Italy) Franco Morbidelli	Ducati	1:37.931
13	36	(Spain) Joan Mir	Honda	1:37.975
14	43	(Australia) Jack Miller	Yamaha	1:38.058
15	10	(Italy) Luca Marini	Honda	1:38.136
16	12	(Spain) Maverick Viñales	KTM	1:38.315
17	54	(Spain) Fermín Aldeguer	Ducati	1:38.347
18	88	(Portugal) Miguel Oliveira	Yamaha	1:38.649
19	35	(Thailand) Somkiat Chantra	Honda	1:38.651
20	25	(Spain) Raúl Fernández	Aprilia	1:38.746
21	23	(Italy) Enea Bastianini	KTM	1:38.785
22	32	(Italy) Lorenzo Savadori	Aprilia	1:39.076
OFFICIAL MOTOGP PRACTICE TIMES REPORT

=== Moto2 ===
==== Combined Practice 1-2 ====
Fastest session lap

Pos.	No.	Biker	Constructor	Practice times	
Pos.	No.	Biker	Constructor	P1	P2
1	96	(United Kingdom) Jake Dixon	Boscoscuro	1:44.445	**1:41.486**
2	7	(Belgium) Barry Baltus	Kalex	1:46.310	1:41.559
3	44	(Spain) Arón Canet	Kalex	1:44.515	1:41.706
4	18	(Spain) Manuel González	Kalex	**1:44.147**	1:41.732
5	53	(Turkey) Deniz Öncü	Kalex	1:45.229	1:41.826
6	15	(South Africa) Darryn Binder	Kalex	1:45.082	1:41.837
7	13	(Italy) Celestino Vietti	Boscoscuro	1:46.008	1:41.857
8	21	(Spain) Alonso López	Boscoscuro	1:45.564	1:41.868
9	12	(Czech Republic) Filip Salač	Boscoscuro	1:45.935	1:41.882
10	81	(Australia) Senna Agius	Kalex	1:46.505	1:41.951
11	84	(Netherlands) Zonta van den Goorbergh	Kalex	1:46.119	1:41.956
12	24	(Spain) Marcos Ramírez	Kalex	1:45.371	1:42.011
13	11	(Spain) Álex Escrig	Forward	1:45.720	1:42.042
14	14	(Italy) Tony Arbolino	Boscoscuro	1:44.236	1:42.064
15	75	(Spain) Albert Arenas	Kalex	1:45.599	1:42.083
16	80	(Colombia) David Alonso	Kalex	1:45.866	1:42.260
17	16	(United States) Joe Roberts	Kalex	1:46.076	1:42.270
18	10	(Brazil) Diogo Moreira	Kalex	1:44.617	1:42.276
19	27	(Spain) Daniel Holgado	Kalex	1:47.241	1:42.314
20	71	(Japan) Ayumu Sasaki	Kalex	1:46.277	1:42.339
21	99	(Spain) Adrián Huertas	Kalex	1:46.235	1:42.383
22	95	(Netherlands) Collin Veijer	Kalex	1:47.053	1:42.566
23	64	(Indonesia) Mario Aji	Kalex	1:44.627	1:42.648
24	28	(Spain) Izan Guevara	Boscoscuro	1:45.720	1:42.855
25	9	(Spain) Jorge Navarro	Forward	1:46.681	1:43.015
26	4	(Spain) Iván Ortolá	Boscoscuro	1:47.005	1:43.172
27	92	(Japan) Yuki Kunii	Kalex	1:46.756	1:43.333
28	66	(Spain) Óscar Gutiérrez	Boscoscuro	No time	1:43.920
OFFICIAL MOTO2 FREE PRACTICE TIMES REPORT

==== Practice ====
The top 14 riders (written in bold) qualified for Q2.

Pos.	No.	Biker	Constructor	Time results
Pos.	No.	Biker	Constructor	P1
1	18	**(Spain) Manuel González**	**Kalex**	1:41.713
2	21	**(Spain) Alonso López**	**Boscoscuro**	1:41.873
3	96	**(United Kingdom) Jake Dixon**	**Boscoscuro**	1:41.888
4	24	**(Spain) Marcos Ramírez**	**Kalex**	1:42.145
5	7	**(Belgium) Barry Baltus**	**Kalex**	1:42.276
6	44	**(Spain) Arón Canet**	**Kalex**	1:42.338
7	14	**(Italy) Tony Arbolino**	**Boscoscuro**	1:42.355
8	16	**(United States) Joe Roberts**	**Kalex**	1:42.385
9	64	**(Indonesia) Mario Aji**	**Kalex**	1:42.478
10	99	**(Spain) Adrián Huertas**	**Kalex**	1:42.587
11	75	**(Spain) Albert Arenas**	**Kalex**	1:42.589
12	15	**(South Africa) Darryn Binder**	**Kalex**	1:42.593
13	84	**(Netherlands) Zonta van den Goorbergh**	**Kalex**	1:42.691
14	27	**(Spain) Daniel Holgado**	**Kalex**	1:42.691
15	53	(Turkey) Deniz Öncü	Kalex	1:42.710
16	10	(Brazil) Diogo Moreira	Kalex	1:42.792
17	28	(Spain) Izan Guevara	Boscoscuro	1:42.816
18	71	(Japan) Ayumu Sasaki	Kalex	1:42.828
19	12	(Czech Republic) Filip Salač	Boscoscuro	1:42.866
20	80	(Colombia) David Alonso	Kalex	1:43.032
21	81	(Australia) Senna Agius	Kalex	1:43.105
22	9	(Spain) Jorge Navarro	Forward	1:43.106
23	13	(Italy) Celestino Vietti	Boscoscuro	1:43.170
24	4	(Spain) Iván Ortolá	Boscoscuro	1:43.253
25	92	(Japan) Yuki Kunii	Kalex	1:43.382
26	11	(Spain) Álex Escrig	Forward	1:43.744
27	95	(Netherlands) Collin Veijer	Kalex	1:43.885
OFFICIAL MOTO2 PRACTICE TIMES REPORT

=== Moto3 ===
==== Combined Practice 1-2 ====
Fastest session lap

Pos.	No.	Biker	Constructor	Practice times	
Pos.	No.	Biker	Constructor	P1	P2
1	18	(Italy) Matteo Bertelle	KTM	1:58.589	**1:46.303**
2	64	(Spain) David Muñoz	KTM	**1:57.363**	1:47.044
3	82	(Italy) Stefano Nepa	Honda	1:59.658	1:47.074
4	99	(Spain) José Antonio Rueda	KTM	1:57.624	1:47.117
5	54	(Italy) Riccardo Rossi	Honda	2:01.846	1:47.224
6	66	(Australia) Joel Kelso	KTM	2:03.092	1:47.362
7	19	(United Kingdom) Scott Ogden	KTM	1:57.969	1:47.378
8	31	(Spain) Adrián Fernández	Honda	1:58.165	1:47.427
9	83	(Spain) Álvaro Carpe	KTM	2:00.865	1:47.430
10	36	(Spain) Ángel Piqueras	KTM	1:58.653	1:47.434
11	6	(Japan) Ryusei Yamanaka	KTM	2:00.542	1:47.458
12	73	(Argentina) Valentín Perrone	KTM	1:59.229	1:47.533
13	11	(Spain) Adrián Cruces	KTM	1:59.443	1:47.638
14	71	(Italy) Dennis Foggia	KTM	2:01.432	1:47.738
15	94	(Italy) Guido Pini	KTM	2:01.577	1:47.771
16	58	(Italy) Luca Lunetta	Honda	1:59.053	1:47.856
17	28	(Spain) Joel Esteban	KTM	1:58.260	1:47.958
18	89	(Spain) Marcos Uriarte	Honda	1:59.851	1:48.084
19	10	(Italy) Nicola Carraro	Honda	1:59.400	1:48.184
20	14	(New Zealand) Cormac Buchanan	KTM	1:59.183	1:48.192
21	21	(South Africa) Ruche Moodley	KTM	2:00.452	1:48.196
22	22	(Spain) David Almansa	Honda	1:57.797	1:48.394
23	5	(Thailand) Tatchakorn Buasri	Honda	2:00.273	1:48.480
24	72	(Japan) Taiyo Furusato	Honda	1:59.474	1:48.510
25	8	(United Kingdom) Eddie O'Shea	Honda	2:01.887	1:48.563
26	34	(Austria) Jakob Rosenthaler	KTM	1:59.881	1:48.775
OFFICIAL MOTO3 FREE PRACTICE TIMES REPORT

==== Practice ====
The top 14 riders (written in bold) qualified for Q2.

Pos.	No.	Biker	Constructor	Practice times
Pos.	No.	Biker	Constructor	P1
1	22	(Spain) **David Almansa**	**Honda**	**1:46.981**
2	83	(Spain) **Álvaro Carpe**	**KTM**	**1:47.345**
3	99	(Spain) **José Antonio Rueda**	**KTM**	**1:47.451**
4	73	(Argentina) **Valentín Perrone**	**KTM**	**1:47.685**
5	66	(Australia) **Joel Kelso**	**KTM**	**1:47.754**
6	6	(Japan) **Ryusei Yamanaka**	**KTM**	**1:47.774**
7	36	(Spain) **Ángel Piqueras**	**KTM**	**1:47.786**
8	19	(United Kingdom) **Scott Ogden**	**KTM**	**1:48.015**
9	71	(Italy) **Dennis Foggia**	**KTM**	**1:48.085**
10	31	(Spain) **Adrián Fernández**	**Honda**	**1:48.144**
11	82	(Italy) **Stefano Nepa**	**Honda**	**1:48.194**
12	78	(Spain) **Joel Esteban**	**KTM**	**1:48.223**
13	54	(Italy) **Riccardo Rossi**	**Honda**	**1:48.257**
14	10	(Italy) **Nicola Carraro**	**Honda**	**1:48.296**
15	64	(Spain) David Muñoz	KTM	1:48.382
16	11	(Spain) Adrián Cruces	KTM	1:48.385
17	21	(South Africa) Ruche Moodley	KTM	1:48.468
18	18	(Italy) Matteo Bertelle	KTM	1:48.469
19	89	(Spain) Marcos Uriarte	Honda	1:48.486
20	8	(United Kingdom) Eddie O'Shea	Honda	1:48.646
21	58	(Italy) Luca Lunetta	Honda	1:48.683
22	72	(Japan) Taiyo Furusato	Honda	1:48.800
23	5	(Thailand) Tatchakorn Buasri	Honda	1:48.871
24	34	(Austria) Jakob Rosenthaler	KTM	1:49.023
25	14	(New Zealand) Cormac Buchanan	KTM	1:49.029
26	94	(Italy) Guido Pini	KTM	1:49.579
OFFICIAL MOTO3 PRACTICE TIMES REPORT

== Qualifying ==
=== MotoGP ===
Fastest session lap

Pos.	No.	Biker	Team	Constructor	Qualifying times		Final grid	Row
Pos.	No.	Biker	Team	Constructor	Q1	Q2	Final grid	Row
1	93	(Spain) Marc Márquez	Ducati Lenovo Team	Ducati	Qualified in Q2	1:36.917	1	1
2	73	(Spain) Álex Márquez	BK8 Gresini Racing MotoGP	Ducati	Qualified in Q2	1:37.163	2	1
3	5	(France) Johann Zarco	CASTROL Honda LCR	Honda	Qualified in Q2	1:37.205	3	1
4	63	(Italy) Francesco Bagnaia	Ducati Lenovo Team	Ducati	Qualified in Q2	1:37.268	4	2
5	37	(Spain) Pedro Acosta	Red Bull KTM Factory Racing	KTM	Qualified in Q2	1:37.274	5	2
6	49	(Italy) Fabio Di Giannantonio	Pertamina Enduro VR46 Racing Team	Ducati	Qualified in Q2	1:37.286	6	2
7	20	(France) Fabio Quartararo	Monster Energy Yamaha MotoGP Team	Yamaha	Qualified in Q2	1:37.347	7	3
8	21	(Italy) Franco Morbidelli	Pertamina Enduro VR46 Racing Team	Ducati	1:37.312	1:37.382	8	3
9	72	(Italy) Marco Bezzecchi	Aprilia Racing	Aprilia	Qualified in Q2	1:37.414	9	3
10	36	(Spain) Joan Mir	Honda HRC Castrol	Honda	1:37.526	1:37.596	10	4
11	33	(South Africa) Brad Binder	Red Bull KTM Factory Racing	KTM	Qualified in Q2	1:37.702	11	4
12	42	(Spain) Álex Rins	Monster Energy Yamaha MotoGP Team	Yamaha	Qualified in Q2	1:37.749	12	4
13	43	(Australia) Jack Miller	Prima Pramac Yamaha MotoGP	Yamaha	1:37.604	N/A	13	5
14	54	(Spain) Fermín Aldeguer	BK8 Gresini Racing MotoGP	Ducati	1:37.717	N/A	14	5
15	79	(Japan) Ai Ogura	Trackhouse MotoGP Team	Aprilia	1:37.746	N/A	15	5
16	10	(Italy) Luca Marini	Honda HRC Castrol	Honda	1:37.983	N/A	16	6
17	88	(Portugal) Miguel Oliveira	Prima Pramac Yamaha MotoGP	Yamaha	1:38.055	N/A	17	6
18	25	(Spain) Raúl Fernández	Trackhouse MotoGP Team	Aprilia	1:38.157	N/A	18	6
19	35	(Thailand) Somkiat Chantra	IDEMITSU Honda LCR	Honda	1:38.168	N/A	19	7
20	12	(Spain) Maverick Viñales	Red Bull KTM Tech3	KTM	1:38.246	N/A	20	7
21	23	(Italy) Enea Bastianini	Red Bull KTM Tech3	KTM	1:38.328	N/A	21	7
22	32	(Italy) Lorenzo Savadori	Aprilia Racing	Aprilia	1:39.244	N/A	22	8
OFFICIAL MOTOGP QUALIFYING TIMES RESULTS

=== Moto2 ===
Fastest session lap

Pos.	No.	Biker	Team	Constructor	Qualifying times		Final grid	Row
Pos.	No.	Biker	Team	Constructor	P1	P2	Final grid	Row
1	18	(Spain) Manuel González	Liqui Moly Dynavolt Intact GP	Kalex	Qualified in Q2	1:40.870	1	1
2	96	(United Kingdom) Jake Dixon	ELF Marc VDS Racing Team	Boscoscuro	Qualified in Q2	1:41.070	2	1
3	24	(Spain) Marcos Ramírez	OnlyFans American Racing Team	Kalex	Qualified in Q2	1:41.096	3	1
4	11	(Spain) Álex Escrig	KLINT Forward Factory Team	Forward	1:41.443	1:41.114	4	2
5	10	(Brazil) Diogo Moreira	Italtrans Racing Team	Kalex	1:41.559	1:41.156	5	2
6	12	(Czech Republic) Filip Salač	ELF Marc VDS Racing Team	Boscoscuro	1:41.535	1:41.193	6	2
7	21	(Spain) Alonso López	Team HDR Heidrun	Boscoscuro	Qualified in Q2	1:41.287	7	3
8	15	(South Africa) Darryn Binder	ITALJET Gresini Moto2	Kalex	Qualified in Q2	1:41.296	8	3
9	13	(Italy) Celestino Vietti	Team HDR Heidrun	Boscoscuro	1:41.410	1:41.297	9	3
10	44	(Spain) Arón Canet	Fantic Racing LINO SONEGO	Kalex	Qualified in Q2	1:41.314	10	4
11	84	(Netherlands) Zonta van den Goorbergh	RW - Idrofoglia Racing GP	Kalex	Qualified in Q2	1:41.319	11	4
12	14	(Italy) Tony Arbolino	BLU CRU Pramac Yamaha Moto2	Boscoscuro	Qualified in Q2	1:41.340	12	4
13	64	(Indonesia) Mario Aji	Idemitsu Honda Team Asia	Kalex	Qualified in Q2	1:41.385	13	5
14	27	(Spain) Daniel Holgado	CFMOTO Inde Aspar Team	Kalex	Qualified in Q2	1:41.406	14	5
15	7	(Belgium) Barry Baltus	Fantic Racing LINO SONEGO	Kalex	Qualified in Q2	1:41.430	15	5
16	16	(United States) Joe Roberts	OnlyFans American Racing Team	Kalex	Qualified in Q2	1:41.474	16	6
17	99	(Spain) Adrián Huertas	Italtrans Racing Team	Kalex	Qualified in Q2	1:41.533	17	6
18	75	(Spain) Albert Arenas	ITALJET Gresini Moto2	Kalex	Qualified in Q2	1:41.658	18	6
19	53	(Turkey) Deniz Öncü	Red Bull KTM Ajo	Kalex	1:41.628	N/A	19	7
20	80	(Colombia) David Alonso	CFMOTO Inde Aspar Team	Kalex	1:41.734	N/A	20	7
21	71	(Japan) Ayumu Sasaki	RW - Idrofoglia Racing GP	Kalex	1:41.765	N/A	21	7
22	81	(Australia) Senna Agius	Liqui Moly Dynavolt Intact GP	Kalex	1:41.806	N/A	22	8
23	28	(Spain) Izan Guevara	BLU CRU Pramac Yamaha Moto2	Boscoscuro	1:41.925	N/A	23	8
24	4	(Spain) Iván Ortolá	QJMOTOR - FRINSA - MSI	Boscoscuro	1:42.189	N/A	24	8
25	95	(Netherlands) Collin Veijer	Red Bull KTM Ajo	Kalex	1:42.204	N/A	25	9
26	9	(Spain) Jorge Navarro	KLINT Forward Factory Team	Forward	1:42.303	N/A	26	9
27	92	(Japan) Yuki Kunii	Idemitsu Honda Team Asia	Kalex	1:42.540	N/A	27	9
28	66	(Spain) Óscar Gutiérrez	QJMOTOR - FRINSA - MSI	Boscoscuro	1:43.004	N/A	28	10
OFFICIAL MOTOGP QUALIFYING TIMES RESULTS

=== Moto3 ===
Fastest session lap

Pos.	No.	Biker	Team	Constructor	Qualifying times		Final grid	Row
Pos.	No.	Biker	Team	Constructor	P1	P2	Final grid	Row
1	18	(Italy) Matteo Bertelle	LEVELUP-MTA	KTM	1:47.687	1:46.034	1	1
2	36	(Spain) Ángel Piqueras	FRINSA - MT Helmets - MSI	KTM	Qualified in Q2	1:46.266	2	1
3	6	(Japan) Ryusei Yamanaka	FRINSA - MT Helmets - MSI	KTM	Qualified in Q2	1:46.330	3	1
4	22	(Spain) David Almansa	Leopard Racing	Honda	Qualified in Q2	1:46.363	4	2
5	83	(Spain) Álvaro Carpe	Red Bull KTM Ajo	KTM	Qualified in Q2	1:46.645	5	2
6	99	(Spain) José Antonio Rueda	Red Bull KTM Ajo	KTM	Qualified in Q2	1:46.662	6	2
7	54	(Italy) Riccardo Rossi	Rivacold Snipers Team	Honda	Qualified in Q2	1:46.731	7	3
8	66	(Australia) Joel Kelso	LEVELUP-MTA	KTM	Qualified in Q2	1:46.891	8	3
9	73	(Argentina) Valentín Perrone	Red Bull KTM Tech3	KTM	Qualified in Q2	1:46.896	9	3
10	78	(Spain) Joel Esteban	Red Bull KTM Tech3	KTM	Qualified in Q2	1:46.902	10	4
11	71	(Italy) Dennis Foggia	CFMOTO Gaviota Aspar Team	KTM	Qualified in Q2	1:46.973	11	4
12	31	(Spain) Adrián Fernández	Leopard Racing	Honda	Qualified in Q2	1:47.016	12	4
13	11	(Spain) Adrián Cruces	CIP Green Power	KTM	Qualified in Q2	1:47.146	13	5
14	72	(Japan) Taiyo Furusato	Honda Team Asia	Honda	1:48.199	1:47.237	14	5
15	82	(Italy) Stefano Nepa	SIC58 Squadra Corse	Honda	Qualified in Q2	1:47.558	15	5
16	19	(United Kingdom) Scott Ogden	CIP Green Power	KTM	Qualified in Q2	1:47.6001	16	6
17	10	(Italy) Nicola Carraro	Rivacold Snipers Team	Honda	Qualified in Q2	1:47.823	17	6
18	89	(Spain) Marcos Uriarte	GRYD - Mlav Racing	Honda	1:48.149	1:47.826	18	6
19	21	(South Africa) Ruche Moodley	DENSSI Racing - BOE	KTM	1:48.202	N/A	19	7
20	14	(New Zealand) Cormac Buchanan	DENSSI Racing - BOE	KTM	1:48.233	N/A	20	7
21	64	(Spain) David Muñoz	Liqui Moly Dynavolt Intact GP	KTM	1:48.473	N/A	21	7
22	58	(Italy) Luca Lunetta	SIC58 Squadra Corse	Honda	1:48.487	N/A	22	8
23	94	(Italy) Guido Pini	Liqui Moly Dynavolt Intact GP	KTM	1:49.467	N/A	23	8
24	8	(United Kingdom) Eddie O'Shea	GRYD - Mlav Racing	Honda	1:49.536	N/A	24	8
25	34	(Austria) Jakob Rosenthaler	CFMOTO Gaviota Aspar Team	KTM	1:49.579	N/A	25	9
26	5	(Thailand) Tatchakorn Buasri	Honda Team Asia	Honda	1:50.936	N/A	26	9
OFFICIAL MOTO3 QUALIFYING TIMES REPORT

== MotoGP Sprint ==
The MotoGP Sprint was held on 15 March.

Pos.	No.	Rider	Team	Constructor	Laps	Time/Retired	Grid	Points
1	93	(Spain) Marc Márquez	Ducati Lenovo Team	Ducati	12	19:37.331	1	12
2	73	(Spain) Álex Márquez	BK8 Gresini Racing MotoGP	Ducati	12	+0.903	2	9
3	63	(Italy) Francesco Bagnaia	Ducati Lenovo Team	Ducati	12	+3.859	4	7
4	5	(France) Johann Zarco	Castrol Honda LCR	Honda	12	+5.026	3	6
5	49	(Italy) Fabio Di Giannantonio	Pertamina Enduro VR46 Racing Team	Ducati	12	+6.451	6	5
6	72	(Italy) Marco Bezzecchi	Aprilia Racing	Aprilia	12	+7.333	9	4
7	21	(Italy) Franco Morbidelli	Pertamina Enduro VR46 Racing Team	Ducati	12	+8.368	8	3
8	36	(Spain) Joan Mir	Honda HRC Castrol	Honda	12	+10.858	10	2
9	37	(Spain) Pedro Acosta	Red Bull KTM Factory Racing	KTM	12	+11.229	5	1
10	20	(France) Fabio Quartararo	Monster Energy Yamaha MotoGP Team	Yamaha	12	+12.356	7	
11	43	(Australia) Jack Miller	Prima Pramac Yamaha MotoGP	Yamaha	12	+15.201	13	
12	42	(Spain) Álex Rins	Monster Energy Yamaha MotoGP Team	Yamaha	12	+15.298	12	
13	10	(Italy) Luca Marini	Honda HRC Castrol	Honda	12	+16.653	16	
14	23	(Italy) Enea Bastianini	Red Bull KTM Tech3	KTM	12	+18.442	21	
15	79	(Japan) Ai Ogura	Trackhouse MotoGP Team	Aprilia	12	+18.618	15	
16	25	(Spain) Raúl Fernández	Trackhouse MotoGP Team	Aprilia	12	+19.560	18	
17	35	(Thailand) Somkiat Chantra	Idemitsu Honda LCR	Honda	12	+20.925	19	
18	12	(Spain) Maverick Viñales	Red Bull KTM Tech3	KTM	12	+21.287	20	
19	54	(Spain) Fermín Aldeguer	BK8 Gresini Racing MotoGP	Ducati	12	+45.325	14	
Ret	32	(Italy) Lorenzo Savadori	Aprilia Racing	Aprilia	6	Retired in pits	22	
Ret	88	(Portugal) Miguel Oliveira	Prima Pramac Yamaha MotoGP	Yamaha	4	Collision	17	
Ret	33	(South Africa) Brad Binder	Red Bull KTM Factory Racing	KTM	0	Collision	11	
Fastest lap: (Spain) Marc Márquez (Ducati) - 1:37.706 (lap 3)
OFFICIAL MOTOGP SPRINT REPORT

== Warm Up ==
=== Warm Up MotoGP ===
Pos.	No.	Biker	Constructor	
Pos.	No.	Biker	Constructor	Time results
1	93	(Spain) Marc Márquez	Ducati	1:37.889
2	73	(Spain) Álex Márquez	Ducati	1:37.890
3	49	(Italy) Fabio Di Giannantonio	Ducati	1:38.237
4	72	(Italy) Marco Bezzecchi	Aprilia	1:38.241
5	63	(Italy) Francesco Bagnaia	Ducati	1:38.273
6	21	(Italy) Franco Morbidelli	Ducati	1:38.300
7	36	(Spain) Joan Mir	Honda	1:38.328
8	54	(Spain) Fermín Aldeguer	Ducati	1:38.347
9	37	(Spain) Pedro Acosta	KTM	1:38.368
10	20	(France) Fabio Quartararo	Yamaha	1:38.493
11	12	(Spain) Maverick Viñales	KTM	1:38.569
12	10	(Italy) Luca Marini	Honda	1:38.594
13	5	(France) Johann Zarco	Honda	1:38.619
14	43	(Australia) Jack Miller	Yamaha	1:38.765
15	79	(Japan) Ai Ogura	Aprilia	1:38.802
16	42	(Spain) Álex Rins	Yamaha	1:39.043
17	23	(Italy) Enea Bastianini	KTM	1:39.112
18	25	(Spain) Raúl Fernández	Aprilia	1:39.156
19	35	(Thailand) Somkiat Chantra	Honda	1:39.418
20	32	(Italy) Lorenzo Savadori	Aprilia	1:40.026
21	33	(South Africa) Brad Binder	KTM	1:41.241
OFFICIAL MOTOGP WARM UP TIMES REPORT

== Race ==
=== MotoGP Report ===
At the start, Marc Márquez kept his lead despite a good getaway from Álex Márquez. Francesco Bagnaia, who had taken third at the start, tried to pass the younger Márquez at turn 5, but ran wide and was re-passed by the Gresini rider. Further back, Aprillia's Marco Bezzecchi outbraked himself going into turn 1, clipping Fabio Quartararo's Yamaha and retiring from the race. The only other crash came on lap 2, when Raúl Fernández pushed Enea Bastianini off the track; this earned Fernández a long lap penalty, Bastianini continued with a damaged bike.

Further ahead, Álex Márquez took the lead away from Marc on lap 4 as the latter ran wide through turn 1. The Ducati rider stayed behind for the majority of the race, despite attempting to pass the #73 on lap 18, before slipstreaming past his brother on lap 21. The elder Márquez eventually won by 1.3 seconds from Álex, as Franco Morbidelli, who had passed Bagnaia for third early on through the use of a soft rear tyre, held on to his first podium placing since the 2021 Spanish Grand Prix. Marc Márquez, who pulled off his second successive sprint and GP win double, later claimed that his brother was now his "main opponent" for the title.

Following the race, eighth-placed Ai Ogura was disqualified for running a non-homologated ECU software.

=== MotoGP ===
Pos.	No.	Rider	Team	Constructor	Laps	Time/Retired	Grid	Points
1	93	(Spain) Marc Márquez	Ducati Lenovo Team	Ducati	25	41:11.100	1	25
2	73	(Spain) Álex Márquez	BK8 Gresini Racing MotoGP	Ducati	25	+1.362	2	20
3	21	(Italy) Franco Morbidelli	Pertamina Enduro VR46 Racing Team	Ducati	25	+4.695	8	16
4	63	(Italy) Francesco Bagnaia	Ducati Lenovo Team	Ducati	25	+5.536	4	13
5	49	(Italy) Fabio Di Giannantonio	Pertamina Enduro VR46 Racing Team	Ducati	25	+7.138	6	11
6	5	(France) Johann Zarco	Castrol Honda LCR	Honda	25	+7.487	3	10
7	33	(South Africa) Brad Binder	Red Bull KTM Factory Racing	KTM	25	+14.294	11	9
8	37	(Spain) Pedro Acosta	Red Bull KTM Factory Racing	KTM	25	+15.646	5	8
9	36	(Spain) Joan Mir	Honda HRC Castrol	Honda	25	+15.787	10	7
10	10	(Italy) Luca Marini	Honda HRC Castrol	Honda	25	+16.025	16	6
11	42	(Spain) Álex Rins	Monster Energy Yamaha MotoGP Team	Yamaha	25	+21.663	12	5
12	12	(Spain) Maverick Viñales	Red Bull KTM Tech3	KTM	25	+22.319	19	4
13	43	(Australia) Jack Miller	Prima Pramac Yamaha MotoGP	Yamaha	25	+23.486	13	3
14	20	(France) Fabio Quartararo	Monster Energy Yamaha MotoGP Team	Yamaha	25	+25.148	7	2
15	25	(Spain) Raúl Fernández	Trackhouse MotoGP Team	Aprilia	25	+26.914	17	1
16	54	(Spain) Fermín Aldeguer	BK8 Gresini Racing MotoGP	Ducati	25	+27.661	14	
17	23	(Italy) Enea Bastianini	Red Bull KTM Tech3	KTM	25	+40.179	20	
18	35	(Thailand) Somkiat Chantra	Idemitsu Honda LCR	Honda	25	+41.693	18	
Ret	72	(Italy) Marco Bezzecchi	Aprilia Racing	Aprilia	0	Collision	9	
DSQ	79	(Japan) Ai Ogura	Trackhouse MotoGP Team	Aprilia		Technical infringement^{1}		
DNS	32	(Italy) Lorenzo Savadori	Aprilia Racing	Aprilia		Injury^{2}	—	
DNS	88	(Portugal) Miguel Oliveira	Prima Pramac Yamaha MotoGP	Yamaha		Injury^{3}	—	
Fastest lap: (Spain) Marc Márquez (Ducati) - 1:38.243 (lap 19)
OFFICIAL MOTOGP RACE REPORT

Notes

- ^1 - Ai Ogura originally finished 8th, but was later disqualified as his bike was using a version of software not homologated by the Championship.
- ^2 - Lorenzo Savadori withdrew from the Grand Prix due to pain in his left shoulder.
- ^3 - Miguel Oliveira withdrew from the Grand Prix due to concerns regarding the ligaments of his left shoulder after a crash in the Sprint. The riders behind him on the grid each moved up one position.

=== Moto2 Report ===
Jake Dixon took the holeshot at the start and passed polesitter Manuel González, whilst Adrián Huertas became the only lap 1 casualty after sliding off at turn 2. Dixon's VDS teammate, Filip Salač, progressed up to third in the opening laps. At the end of the back straight on lap 2, Salač passed González for second, though the Spaniard retook the place less than two laps later. Whilst Arón Canet and Marcos Ramírez fought for fourth and Diogo Moreira pitted with a mechanical problem, Dixon was able to eek out an advantage until the race's midpoint.

On lap 11, Salač and Ramírez tangled at turn 5 during an overtaking attempt by the Boscoscuro rider, who exited the race; this collision allowed the battling duo of Canet and Celestino Vietti to pass Ramírez. Canet made an error two laps later that resulted in Vietti taking third place. Despite a later mistake by the Italian, which briefly allowed Canet to get past, he eventually took third with a block pass, as Dixon scored a dominant first win of the season ahead of González. Canet and Ramírez completed the top five.

González retained the championship lead, sitting 11 points ahead of race winner Dixon and a further point clear of Canet.

=== Moto2 ===
Pos.	No.	Rider	Team	Constructor	Laps	Time/Retired	Grid	Points
1	96	(United Kingdom) Jake Dixon	Elf Marc VDS Racing Team	Boscoscuro	21	35:48.793	2	25
2	18	(Spain) Manuel González	Liqui Moly Dynavolt Intact GP	Kalex	21	+3.525	1	20
3	13	(Italy) Celestino Vietti	Team HDR Heidrun	Boscoscuro	21	+10.098	9	16
4	44	(Spain) Arón Canet	Fantic Racing Lino Sonego	Kalex	21	+10.508	10	13
5	24	(Spain) Marcos Ramírez	OnlyFans American Racing Team	Kalex	21	+11.009	3	11
6	15	(South Africa) Darryn Binder	Italjet Gresini Moto2	Kalex	21	+14.409	8	10
7	11	(Spain) Álex Escrig	Klint Forward Factory Team	Forward	21	+16.673	4	9
8	21	(Spain) Alonso López	Team HDR Heidrun	Boscoscuro	21	+17.373	7	8
9	27	(Spain) Daniel Holgado	CFMoto Inde Aspar Team	Kalex	21	+19.035	14	7
10	75	(Spain) Albert Arenas	Italjet Gresini Moto2	Kalex	21	+19.366	18	6
11	14	(Italy) Tony Arbolino	Blu Cru Pramac Yamaha Moto2	Boscoscuro	21	+20.584	12	5
12	7	(Belgium) Barry Baltus	Fantic Racing Lino Sonego	Kalex	21	+21.435	15	4
13	81	(Australia) Senna Agius	Liqui Moly Dynavolt Intact GP	Kalex	21	+22.446	22	3
14	53	(Turkey) Deniz Öncü	Red Bull KTM Ajo	Kalex	21	+23.216	19	2
15	28	(Spain) Izan Guevara	Blu Cru Pramac Yamaha Moto2	Boscoscuro	21	+23.302	23	1
16	16	(United States) Joe Roberts	OnlyFans American Racing Team	Kalex	21	+25.784	16	
17	84	(Netherlands) Zonta van den Goorbergh	RW-Idrofoglia Racing GP	Kalex	21	+25.982	11	
18	71	(Japan) Ayumu Sasaki	RW-Idrofoglia Racing GP	Kalex	21	+29.225	21	
19	4	(Spain) Iván Ortolá	QJMotor – Frinsa – MSi	Boscoscuro	21	+29.320	24	
20	80	(Colombia) David Alonso	CFMoto Inde Aspar Team	Kalex	21	+29.518	20	
21	9	(Spain) Jorge Navarro	Klint Forward Factory Team	Forward	21	+34.770	26	
22	66	(Spain) Óscar Gutiérrez	QJMotor – Frinsa – MSi	Boscoscuro	21	+43.909	28	
23	92	(Japan) Yuki Kunii	Idemitsu Honda Team Asia	Kalex	21	+44.157	27	
24	95	(Netherlands) Collin Veijer	Red Bull KTM Ajo	Kalex	21	+50.421	25	
Ret	64	(Indonesia) Mario Aji	Idemitsu Honda Team Asia	Kalex	13	Accident	13	
Ret	12	(Czech Republic) Filip Salač	Elf Marc VDS Racing Team	Boscoscuro	12	Accident damage	6	
Ret	10	(Brazil) Diogo Moreira	Italtrans Racing Team	Kalex	11	Retired	5	
Ret	99	(Spain) Adrián Huertas	Italtrans Racing Team	Kalex	0	Accident	17	
Fastest lap: (United Kingdom) Jake Dixon (Boscoscuro) - 1:41.639 (lap 7)
OFFICIAL MOTO2 RACE REPORT

=== Moto3 ===
Pos.	No.	Rider	Team	Constructor	Laps	Time/Retired	Grid	Points
1	36	(Spain) Ángel Piqueras	Frinsa – MT Helmets – MSi	KTM	18	32:31.938	2	25
2	31	(Spain) Adrián Fernández	Leopard Racing	Honda	18	+0.036	12	20
3	99	(Spain) José Antonio Rueda	Red Bull KTM Ajo	KTM	18	+0.125	6	16
4	18	(Italy) Matteo Bertelle	LevelUp – MTA	KTM	18	+0.373	1	13
5 (Note: 1-position penalty for exceeding track limits on the last lap.)	72	(Japan) Taiyo Furusato	Honda Team Asia	Honda	18	+0.236	14	11
6	22	(Spain) David Almansa	Leopard Racing	Honda	18	+1.354	4	10
7	58	(Italy) Luca Lunetta	Sic58 Squadra Corse	Honda	18	+1.760	21	9
8	66	(Australia) Joel Kelso	LevelUp – MTA	KTM	18	+1.950	8	8
9	6	(Japan) Ryusei Yamanaka	Frinsa – MT Helmets – MSi	KTM	18	+4.543	3	7
10	82	(Italy) Stefano Nepa	Sic58 Squadra Corse	Honda	18	+4.702	15	6
11	71	(Italy) Dennis Foggia	CFMoto Gaviota Aspar Team	KTM	18	+4.990	11	5
12	19	(United Kingdom) Scott Ogden	CIP Green Power	KTM	18	+5.391	16	4
13	11	(Spain) Adrián Cruces	CIP Green Power	KTM	18	+6.121	13	3
14	14	(New Zealand) Cormac Buchanan	Denssi Racing – Boé	KTM	18	+6.739	20	2
15	21	(South Africa) Ruché Moodley	Denssi Racing – Boé	KTM	18	+6.875	19	1
16	78	(Spain) Joel Esteban	Red Bull KTM Tech3	KTM	18	+7.822 (Note: 3-second penalty for failing to comply with long lap penalty.)	10	
17	8	(United Kingdom) Eddie O'Shea	Gryd – MLav Racing	Honda	18	+15.691	23	
18	54	(Italy) Riccardo Rossi	Rivacold Snipers Team	Honda	18	+16.604	7	
19	10	(Italy) Nicola Carraro	Rivacold Snipers Team	Honda	18	+17.065	17	
20	34	(Austria) Jakob Rosenthaler	CFMoto Gaviota Aspar Team	KTM	18	+21.940	24	
21	5	(Thailand) Tatchakorn Buasri	Honda Team Asia	Honda	18	+22.276	25	
NC	83	(Spain) Álvaro Carpe	Red Bull KTM Ajo	KTM	18	+1:01.585 (Note: Not classified due to finishing the race through pits.)	5	
Ret	73	(Argentina) Valentín Perrone	Red Bull KTM Tech3	KTM	17	Collision	9	
Ret	64	(Spain) David Muñoz	Liqui Moly Dynavolt Intact GP	KTM	15	Retired	26	
Ret	89	(Spain) Marcos Uriarte	Gryd – MLav Racing	Honda	12	Accident	18	
Ret	94	(Italy) Guido Pini	Liqui Moly Dynavolt Intact GP	KTM	7	Accident damage	22	
Fastest lap: (Spain) Ángel Piqueras (KTM) - 1:47.249 (lap 16)
OFFICIAL MOTO3 RACE REPORT

== Championship standings after the race ==
Below are the standings for the top five riders, constructors, and teams after the round.

=== MotoGP ===
Riders' Championship standings

	Pos.	Rider	Points
	1	(Spain) Marc Márquez	74
	2	(Spain) Álex Márquez	58
	3	(Italy) Francesco Bagnaia	43
	4	(Italy) Franco Morbidelli	37
3	5	(France) Johann Zarco	25

Constructors' Championship standings

	Pos.	Constructor	Points
	1	(Italy) Ducati	74
2	2	(Japan) Honda	26
1	3	(Italy) Aprilia	22
1	4	(Austria) KTM	22
	5	(Japan) Yamaha	13

Teams' Championship standings

	Pos.	Team	Points
	1	(Italy) Ducati Lenovo Team	117
	2	(Italy) BK8 Gresini Racing MotoGP	61
	3	(Italy) Pertamina Enduro VR46 Racing Team	59
1	4	(Austria) Red Bull KTM Factory Racing	32
2	5	(Monaco) LCR Honda	25

=== Moto2 ===
Riders' Championship standings

	Pos.	Rider	Points
	1	(Spain) Manuel González	45
5	2	(United Kingdom) Jake Dixon	34
1	3	(Spain) Arón Canet	33
1	4	(Spain) Marcos Ramírez	22
2	5	(Australia) Senna Agius	19

Constructors' Championship standings

Pos.	Constructor	Points
1	(Germany) Kalex	45
2	(Italy) Boscoscuro	34
3	(Switzerland) Forward	9

Teams' Championship standings

	Pos.	Team	Points
	1	(Germany) Liqui Moly Dynavolt Intact GP	64
	2	(Italy) Fantic Racing Lino Sonego	47
	3	(Belgium) Elf Marc VDS Racing Team	41
3	4	(Italy) Team HDR Heidrun	30
	5	(United States) OnlyFans American Racing Team	22

=== Moto3 ===
Riders' Championship standings

	Pos.	Rider	Points
	1	(Spain) José Antonio Rueda	41
1	2	(Spain) Adrián Fernández	36
9	3	(Spain) Ángel Piqueras	29
1	4	(Italy) Matteo Bertelle	24
3	5	(Spain) Álvaro Carpe	20

Constructors' Championship standings

Pos.	Constructor	Points
1	(Austria) KTM	50
2	(Japan) Honda	36

Teams' Championship standings

	Pos.	Team	Points
	1	(Finland) Red Bull KTM Ajo	61
	2	(Luxembourg) Leopard Racing	55
6	3	(Spain) Frinsa – MT Helmets – MSi	36
1	4	(Italy) Sic58 Squadra Corse	34
1	5	(Italy) LevelUp – MTA	32

== Notes ==
Previous race: 2025 Thailand Grand Prix	FIM Grand Prix World Championship; 2025 season	Next race: 2025 Grand Prix of the Americas
Previous race: 2023 Argentine Grand Prix	Argentine motorcycle Grand Prix	Next race: 2027 Argentine Grand Prix
