= Noah Dettwiler =

Swiss motorcycle racer (born 2005)

- Nationality: Swiss
- Born: 26 April 2005 (age 21); Solothurn, Switzerland
- Bike number: 55
Motorcycle racing career statistics
Moto3 World Championship
| Active years | 2023–2025 |
| Manufacturers | CFMoto (2023); KTM (2023–2025) |
| 2025 championship position | 34th (0 pts) |
Starts / Wins / Podiums / Poles / F. laps / Points; 38 / 0 / 0 / 0 / 0 / 2

Noah Dettwiler (born 26 April 2005) is a Swiss Grand Prix motorcycle racer. He has competed in the Moto3 World Championship in 2023, 2024 and 2025. He has also participated in the European Talent Cup, Red Bull MotoGP Rookies Cup, and FIM JuniorGP World Championship.

Dettwiler suffered serious injuries after a crash at the 2025 Malaysian motorcycle Grand Prix. He was hospitalized and has been in recovery since November 2025.

== Career ==
=== Moto3 World Championship ===
Dettwiler made his Grand Prix debut in Moto3 in 2023, making a wildcard appearance for CFMoto Racing Prüstel GP at the Austrian Grand Prix, finishing 20th. At the Indonesian Grand Prix, he replaced the injured David Salvador at CIP Green Power, finishing 26th.

In 2024, Dettwiler was signed by CIP Green Power on a two-year deal to race alongside Riccardo Rossi. Dettwiler scored his first and only championship points of the 2024 season in the American Grand Prix by placing 14th. By the end of the season, Dettwiler placed 26th in the final championship standings with two points.

Dettwiler continued to race for CIP in 2025, now riding with new teammate Scott Ogden. He missed the first three rounds of the season due to a left wrist injury sustained in the pre-season tests at Jerez. Adrián Cruces filled in for him. Dettwiler's best finish in 2025 was 16th place, achieved four times at the Spanish, Aragon, Dutch, and German Grands Prix.

==== Accident at the 2025 Malaysian Grand Prix ====
On 26 October 2025, during the sighting lap of the 2025 Malaysian Grand Prix, Dettwiler experienced a technical issue and slowed down on the racing line. José Antonio Rueda, 2025 Moto3 World Champion, was riding directly behind and, unaware of Dettwiler’s abnormally low speed, was unable to react in time and struck the rear of Dettwiler’s bike at high speed. The accident caused the race to be immediately postponed, and both riders were airlifted to a local hospital in Kuala Lumpur. Dettwiler's father told Swiss newspaper Blick that he had suffered multiple cardiac arrests, injuries to his lungs and spleen, and an open leg fracture. The team's official report confirmed Dettwiler had undergone several surgeries and was in critical but stable condition. Three days after the accident, the team released a second report stating that Dettwiler's condition was no longer critical but remained under observation in the ICU.

On 31 October 2025, CIP Green Power published a report confirming the injuries Dettwiler sustained from the crash, the removal of his spleen during surgery due to severe bleeding, and an additional injury on his neck which was found after performing X-rays. A health update was also provided, stating that he was now awake and communicating. It also confirmed he had left the ICU and had been transferred to a private clinic in Kuala Lumpur. Dettwiler was later transported to his home in Switzerland in order to begin his recovery.

Shortly after the accident, Paolo Simoncelli—Sic58 Squadra Corse team principal—revealed he had initiated talks with Dettwiler prior to the crash to have him race for his team in the following season, and that they were willing to wait for his recovery. However, in December 2025, Dettwiler revealed he would not be taking the seat for 2026 due to the uncertainty surrounding his recovery time.

=== Return to racing ===
In October 2026, Dettwiler returned to racing by competing in the Italian Supersport championship in Vallelunga.

== Career statistics ==
=== Career highlights ===
- 2015: 1st, Supermoto 65ccm Championship
- 2016: 1st, Supermoto 85ccm Championship

=== European Talent Cup ===
==== Races by year ====
(key) (Races in bold indicate pole position; races in italics indicate fastest lap)

| Year | Bike | 1 | 2 | 3 | 4 | 5 | 6 | 7 | 8 | 9 | 10 | 11 | Pos | Pts |
|---|---|---|---|---|---|---|---|---|---|---|---|---|---|---|
| 2020 | Honda | EST; 12 | EST; 18 | ALG; 16 | JER; 19 | JER; 12 | JER; DNS | ARA; Ret | ARA; 23 | ARA; 22 | VAL; 14 | VAL; 20 | 23rd | 10 |

=== Red Bull MotoGP Rookies Cup ===
==== Races by year ====
(key) (Races in bold indicate pole position, races in italics indicate fastest lap)

| Year | Bike | 1 | | 2 | | 3 | | 4 | | 5 | | 6 | | 7 | | Pos | Pts |
| Year | Bike | R1 | R2 | R1 | R2 | R1 | R2 | R1 | R2 | R1 | R2 | R1 | R2 | R1 | R2 | Pos | Pts |
|---|---|---|---|---|---|---|---|---|---|---|---|---|---|---|---|---|---|
| 2019 | KTM | JER1; 15 | JER2; Ret | MUG; 19 | ASS1; Ret | ASS2; 18 | SAC1; 18 | SAC2; 16 | RBR1; 18 | RBR2; 18 | MIS; 19 | ARA1; 11 | ARA2; 18 | | | 24th | 6 |
| 2020 | KTM | RBR1; 6 | RBR1; 14 | RBR2; 8 | RBR2; 9 | ARA1; 14 | ARA1; 14 | ARA2; 18 | ARA2; 20 | VAL1; 8 | VAL1; Ret | VAL2 | VAL2 | | | 17th | 39 |
| 2021 | KTM | POR1; 17 | POR2; Ret | SPA1; 12 | SPA2; 10 | MUG1; 14 | MUG2; DNS | GER1; 9 | GER2; 5 | RBR1; 13 | RBR2; 15 | RBR3; 16 | RBR4; 12 | ARA1 | ARA2 | 17th | 38 |

=== Grand Prix motorcycle racing ===
==== By season ====
| Season | Class | Motorcycle | Team | Race | Win | Podium | Pole | FLap | Pts | Plcd |
|---|---|---|---|---|---|---|---|---|---|---|
| 2023 | Moto3 | CFMoto | CFMoto Prüstel GP | 1 | 0 | 0 | 0 | 0 | 0 | 38th |
| 2023 | Moto3 | KTM | CIP Green Power | 1 | 0 | 0 | 0 | 0 | 0 | 38th |
| 2024 | Moto3 | KTM | CIP Green Power | 20 | 0 | 0 | 0 | 0 | 2 | 25th |
| 2025 | Moto3 | KTM | CIP Green Power | 16 | 0 | 0 | 0 | 0 | 0 | 34th |
| Total | | | | **38** | **0** | **0** | **0** | **0** | **2** | |

==== By class ====
| Class | Seasons | 1st GP | 1st pod | 1st win | Race | Win | Podiums | Pole | FLap | Pts | WChmp |
|---|---|---|---|---|---|---|---|---|---|---|---|
| Moto3 | 2023–2025 | 2023 Austria | | | 38 | 0 | 0 | 0 | 0 | 2 | 0 |
| Total | 2023–2025 | | | | **38** | **0** | **0** | **0** | **0** | **2** | **0** |

==== Races by year ====
(key) (Races in bold indicate pole position; races in italics indicate fastest lap)

| Year | Class | Bike | 1 | 2 | 3 | 4 | 5 | 6 | 7 | 8 | 9 | 10 | 11 | 12 | 13 | 14 | 15 | 16 | 17 | 18 | 19 | 20 | 21 | 22 | Pos | Pts |
|---|---|---|---|---|---|---|---|---|---|---|---|---|---|---|---|---|---|---|---|---|---|---|---|---|---|---|
| 2023 | Moto3 | CFMoto | POR | ARG | AME | SPA | FRA | ITA | GER | NED | GBR | AUT; 20 | CAT | RSM | IND | JPN | | | | | | | | | 38th | 0 |
| 2023 | Moto3 | KTM | | | | | | | | | | | | | | | INA; 26 | AUS | THA | MAL | QAT | VAL | | | 38th | 0 |
| 2024 | Moto3 | KTM | QAT; 17 | POR; 19 | AME; 14 | SPA; 21 | FRA; 18 | CAT; 21 | ITA; 20 | NED; 23 | GER; 23 | GBR; 20 | AUT; 24 | CAT; 17 | RSM; 20 | EMI; 22 | INA; 18 | JPN; Ret | AUS; 21 | THA; 23 | MAL; 18 | SLD; 23 | | | 25th | 2 |
| 2025 | Moto3 | KTM | THA | ARG | AME | QAT; 17 | SPA; 16 | FRA; 20 | GBR; 18 | ARA; 16 | ITA; 19 | NED; 16 | GER; 16 | CZE; 19 | AUT; 23 | HUN; 18 | CAT; 21 | RSM; 19 | JPN; Ret | INA; 17 | AUS; 23 | MAL; DNS | POR | VAL | 34th | 0 |
