= David Muñoz (motorcyclist) =

Spanish motorcycle racer

- Nationality: Spanish
- Born: 15 May 2006 (age 20); Brenes, Spain
- Current team: Liqui Moly Dynavolt Intact GP
- Bike number: 64
Motorcycle racing career statistics
Moto3 World Championship
Active years	2022–
Manufacturers	KTM
2025 championship position	5th (197 pts)
Starts / Wins / Podiums / Poles / F. laps / Points; 79 / 3 / 18 / 2 / 5 / 647

David Muñoz Rodríguez (born 15 May 2006) is a Spanish Grand Prix motorcycle racer, competing for Intact GP in the 2025 Moto3 World Championship.

== Career ==
=== Early career ===
Muñoz began racing nationally in 2015, winning various titles, including the 2015 Copa Sur ANPA MiniGP 110cc, the 2016 Copa de España Cuna de Campeones MiniGP 110cc, and the 2017 Campeonato Andaluz de Minivelocidad Moto5.

In 2018, Muñoz participated in the European Talent Cup, where in two seasons he obtained three podiums including a win at MotorLand Aragón.

In 2020, Muñoz entered the Red Bull MotoGP Rookies Cup, his first season ended with three podium finishes and the following year, seven more were added, including two victories. These results in his second year lead him to finish third in the drivers' standings.

That same year, Muñoz took part in the FIM JuniorGP World Championship, where he won two more races, the first in Aragón and the second in Jerez.

=== Moto3 ===
==== 2022 ====
In 2022, Muñoz made his debut in the world championship racing for the Boé Motorsports team in Moto3. Being still too young, Muñoz was forced by regulation to miss the first seven races of the season and he made his debut in the Italian Grand Prix. In the Catalan Grand Prix, the second held for the Spaniard, he had his first podium in the world championship, finishing second behind Izan Guevara. During the season he got on the podium again, finishing in third place in the Austrian Grand Prix.

==== 2023 ====
For the 2023 season, Muñoz continued to race for the Boé Motorsports team in Moto3. In the first race of the season in Portimão, he finished in second place behind Daniel Holgado.

== Career statistics ==
=== European Talent Cup ===
==== Races by year ====
(key) (Races in bold indicate pole position; races in italics indicate fastest lap)

Year	Bike	1	2	3	4	5	6	7	8	9	10	11	Pts	Pos
2018	Honda	EST1	EST2	VAL1	VAL2	CAT; 17	ARA1; 8	ARA2; 1	JER1; 6	JER2; 6	ALB; Ret	VAL; 19	13th	53
2019	Honda	EST; 3	EST; 13	VAL; 5	VAL; 2	CAT	ARA	ARA	JER	JER	ALB	VAL; 11	11th	55

=== Red Bull MotoGP Rookies Cup ===
==== Races by year ====
(key) (Races in bold indicate pole position, races in italics indicate fastest lap)

Year	1	2	3	4	5	6	7	8	9	10	11	12	13	14	Pos	Pts
2020	RBR1; 2	RBR2; 2	RBR3; 3	RBR4; 8	ARA1; Ret	ARA2; Ret	ARA3; 4	ARA4; 9	VAL1; Ret	VAL2; 3	VAL3; 1	VAL4; 1			2nd	150
2021	POR1; 5	POR2; 4	SPA1; 1	SPA2; 7	MUG1; 2	MUG2; 1	GER1; 3	GER2; Ret	**RBR1**; 4	**RBR2**; 3	RBR3; 2	RBR4; 6	ARA1; 2	ARA2; 4	2nd	211

=== FIM CEV Moto3 Junior World Championship ===
==== Races by year ====
(key) (Races in bold indicate pole position, races in italics indicate fastest lap)

Year	Bike	1	2	3	4	5	6	7	8	9	10	11	12	Pos	Pts
2020	KTM	EST; 12	POR; Ret	JER1; Ret	JER2; 10	JER3; Ret	ARA1; 11	ARA2; 15	ARA3; 16	VAL1; 17	VAL2; Ret	VAL3; Ret		20th	16
2021	KTM	EST; 5	VAL1; 5	VAL2; Ret	CAT1; 2	CAT2; 5	POR; 5	ARA; 1	JER1; 2	JER2; 1	**RSM**; 3	VAL3; 19	VAL4; Ret	3rd	150

=== Grand Prix motorcycle racing ===
==== By season ====
Season	Class	Motorcycle	Team	Race	Win	Podium	Pole	FLap	Pts	Plcd
2022	Moto3	KTM	Boé Motorsports	13	0	2	0	1	93	13th
2023	Moto3	KTM	Boé Motorsports	17	0	2	1	0	113	10th
2024	Moto3	KTM	Boé Motorsports	20	0	4	0	0	172	5th
2025	Moto3	KTM	Liqui Moly Dynavolt Intact GP	18	3	8	1	4	197	5th
2026	Moto3	KTM	Liqui Moly Dynavolt Intact GP	11	0	2	0	0	72*	16th*
Total				**79**	**3**	**18**	**2**	**5**	**647**	

==== By class ====
Class	Seasons	1st GP	1st pod	1st win	Race	Win	Podiums	Pole	FLap	Pts	WChmp
Moto3	2022–present	2022 Italy	2022 Catalunya	2025 Aragón	79	3	18	2	5	647	0
Total	2022–present				**79**	**3**	**18**	**2**	**5**	**647**	**0**

==== Races by year ====
(key) (Races in bold indicate pole position, races in italics indicate fastest lap)

Year	Class	Bike	1	2	3	4	5	6	7	8	9	10	11	12	13	14	15	16	17	18	19	20	21	22	Pos	Pts
2022	Moto3	KTM	QAT	INA	ARG	AME	POR	SPA	FRA	ITA; 11	CAT; 2	GER; 9	NED; Ret	GBR; Ret	AUT; 3	RSM; 12	ARA; 7	JPN; 5	THA; 9	AUS; 11	MAL; Ret	VAL; 7			13th	93
2023	Moto3	KTM	POR; 2	ARG; 16	AME; Ret	SPA; DNS	FRA	ITA	GER; 12	**NED**; 5	GBR; 5	AUT; 9	CAT; Ret	RSM; 4	IND; 6	JPN; 6	INA; 3	AUS; Ret	THA; Ret	MAL; 17	QAT; 12	VAL; 9			10th	113
2024	Moto3	KTM	QAT; 16	POR; 9	AME; 5	SPA; 2	FRA; Ret	CAT; 5	ITA; 5	NED; 3	GER; 8	GBR; 12	AUT; 2	ARA; 7	RSM; Ret	EMI; Ret	INA; 3	JPN; 8	AUS; 5	THA; 6	MAL; 17	SLD; 6			5th	172
2025	Moto3	KTM	THA; Ret	ARG; Ret	**AME**; Ret	QAT; 6	SPA; Ret	FRA; 3	GBR; Ret	ARA; 1	ITA; 5	NED; 2	GER; 1	CZE; 3	AUT; 3	HUN; 3	CAT; 8	RSM; 7	JPN; 1	INA; Ret	AUS	MAL	POR	VAL	5th	197
2026	Moto3	KTM	THA; 10	BRA	USA	SPA; 3	FRA; 18	CAT; 3	ITA; 7	HUN; NC	CZE	NED	GER	GBR	ARA	RSM	AUT; Ret	JPN; 7	INA; Ret	AUS; C	MAL; 8	QAT; 8	POR	VAL	16th*	72*

* Season still in progress.
