= Pedro Acosta =

Spanish motorcycle racer (born 2004)

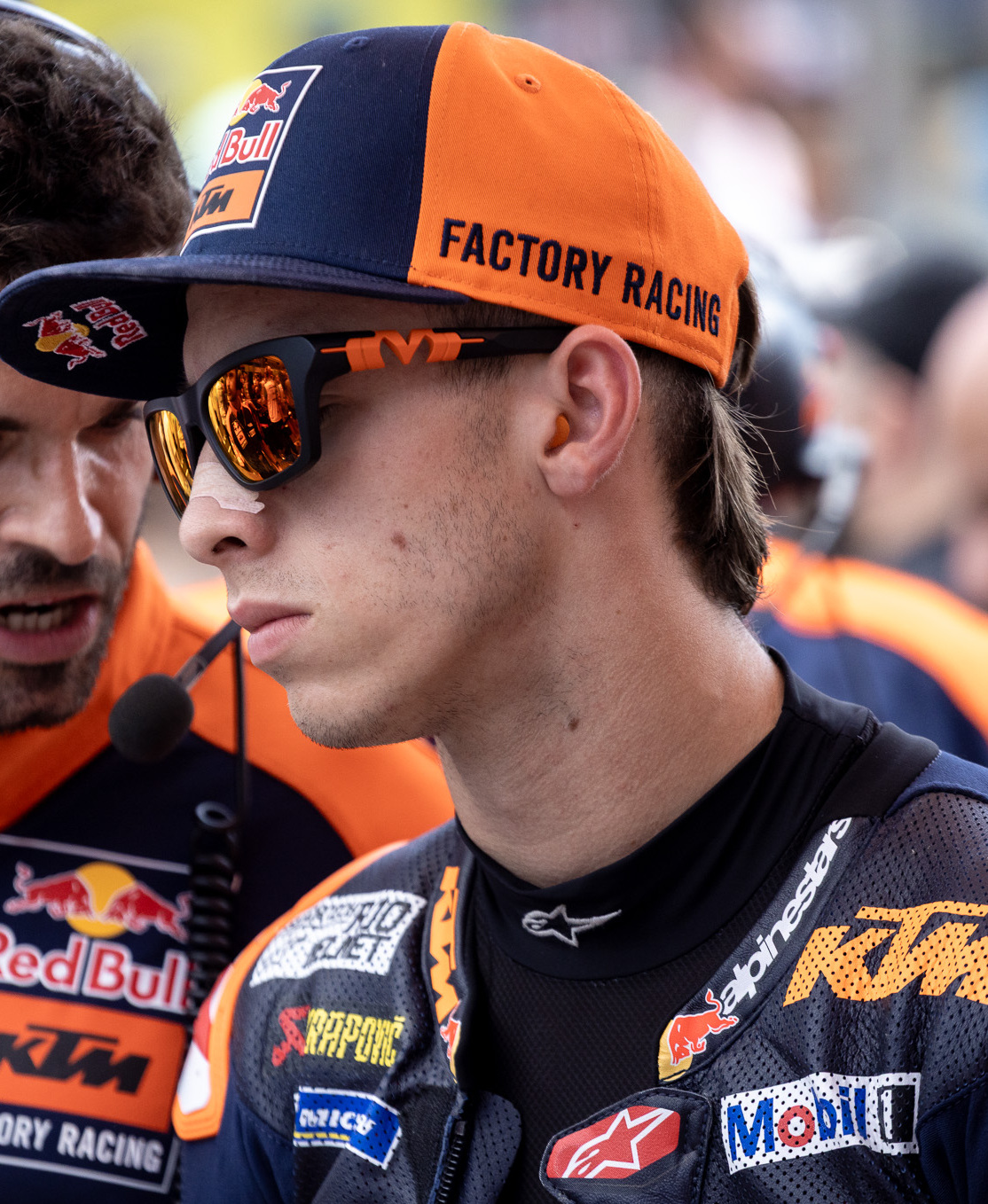
- Acosta at the 2025 Italian Grand Prix
- Nationality: Spanish
- Born: 25 May 2004 (age 22); Mazarrón, Spain
- Current team: Red Bull KTM Factory Racing
- Bike number: 37
Motorcycle racing career statistics
MotoGP World Championship
Active years	2024–
Manufacturers	KTM (2024–2026)
Championships	0
2025 championship position	4th (307 pts)
Starts / Wins / Podiums / Poles / F. laps / Points; 60 / 1 / 17 / 2 / 5 / 831
Moto2 World Championship
Active years	2022–2023
Manufacturers	Kalex
Championships	1 (2023)
2023 championship position	1st (332.5 pts)
Starts / Wins / Podiums / Poles / F. laps / Points; 38 / 10 / 19 / 4 / 9 / 509.5
Moto3 World Championship
Active years	2021
Manufacturers	KTM
Championships	1 (2021)
2021 championship position	1st (259 pts)
Starts / Wins / Podiums / Poles / F. laps / Points; 18 / 6 / 8 / 1 / 1 / 259

Pedro Acosta Sánchez (born 25 May 2004) is a Spanish Grand Prix motorcycle road racer who races for the Red Bull KTM Factory Racing in MotoGP. Acosta won the second Moto3 race he competed in, the 2021 Doha Grand Prix, after starting from the pitlane. In the same season, he won the 2021 Moto3 World Championship to become the first rookie champion since Loris Capirossi in 1990, and the second youngest ever champion, just one day older than Capirossi was at the time of winning. In 2023, Acosta won the Moto2 world championship with two races to go. Acosta is also a champion of the Red Bull MotoGP Rookies Cup, having won the title in 2020. Acosta is set to leave KTM at the end of 2026 to join the factory Ducati team.

== Career ==
=== Early career ===
Acosta participated in various national competitions, winning in 2017 in the PreMoto3 category. In 2018, he entered the Junior Moto3 World Championship. In 2019, he also raced in the Red Bull MotoGP Rookies Cup, finishing second, winning three races. He finished as champion the following year, winning six races in total, all six coming consecutively at the first six races of the season.

=== Moto3 World Championship ===
In 2021, Acosta made his debut racing in Moto3 class with the Red Bull KTM Ajo team. In his first race in Qatar, he finished in second place, becoming one of just a handful of riders to score a podium on their Grand Prix debut. On 4 April 2021, he won the Doha motorcycle Grand Prix starting from pitlane, becoming the first rider in the history of Moto3 to accomplish this feat. Acosta would later win the next two races in Portugal and Spain, becoming the first rider in Grand Prix history to get on the podium in all of his first four races. He would win three more races during the season, in Germany, Styria, and Algarve, becoming champion in Algarve, when Darryn Binder crashed into Acosta's main title rival Dennis Foggia. He won the championship by 43 points, and became the first rookie champion of the Moto3 class since 1990, when Loris Capirossi won the 125cc title. Acosta was only one day older (17 years, 166 days) than Capirossi (17 years, 165 days) when they won their respective titles.

=== Moto2 World Championship ===
==== Red Bull KTM Ajo (2022–2023) ====
Acosta was promoted to Moto2 with the same team in 2022, joining compatriot Augusto Fernández who also moved from Marc VDS Racing Team. He recorded his first Moto2 win during the Italian Grand Prix in Mugello. After missing two rounds due to a broken femur sustained in a training accident, he won another race in Aragón. Acosta won the 2023 Moto2 World Championship.

=== MotoGP World Championship ===
==== Red Bull GasGas Tech3 (2024) ====
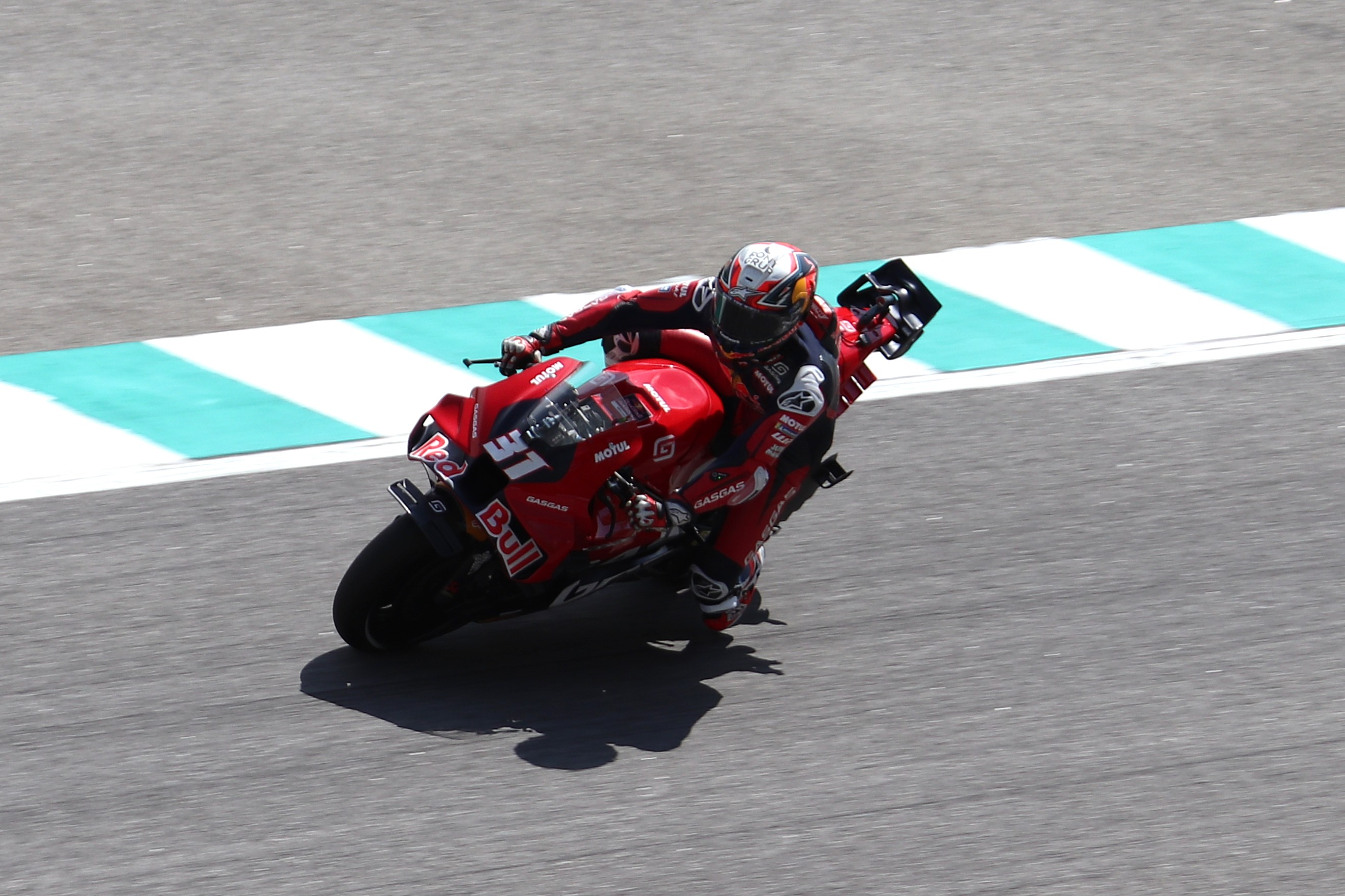
Acosta at the 2024 Malaysian Grand Prix

Acosta was promoted to MotoGP for 2024 with Red Bull GasGas Tech3. He impressed in Qatar as he finished eighth in the sprint and ninth in the race, where he was as high as fourth, but slowed due to tyre degradation. In Portimao, he achieved a podium in the main race, having overtaken experienced riders Brad Binder, Marc Márquez (both in turn 1), and Francesco Bagnaia (in turn 3). At the Circuit of the Americas, he fought Marquez again, as well as Jorge Martin only to finish fourth in the sprint, but in the main race he led a race for the first time and made moves that would have seen either a rider go wide on the exit of the corner or crash, he finished second behind Maverick Viñales. After a long period without podium, he manage to finish third of the sprint race and the main race of the Aragon GP. Acosta also scored his maiden premier class pole position at the Japanese Grand Prix. He finished sixth overall in his first MotoGP season, only two points behind factory rider Brad Binder.

==== Red Bull KTM Factory Racing (2025–2026) ====
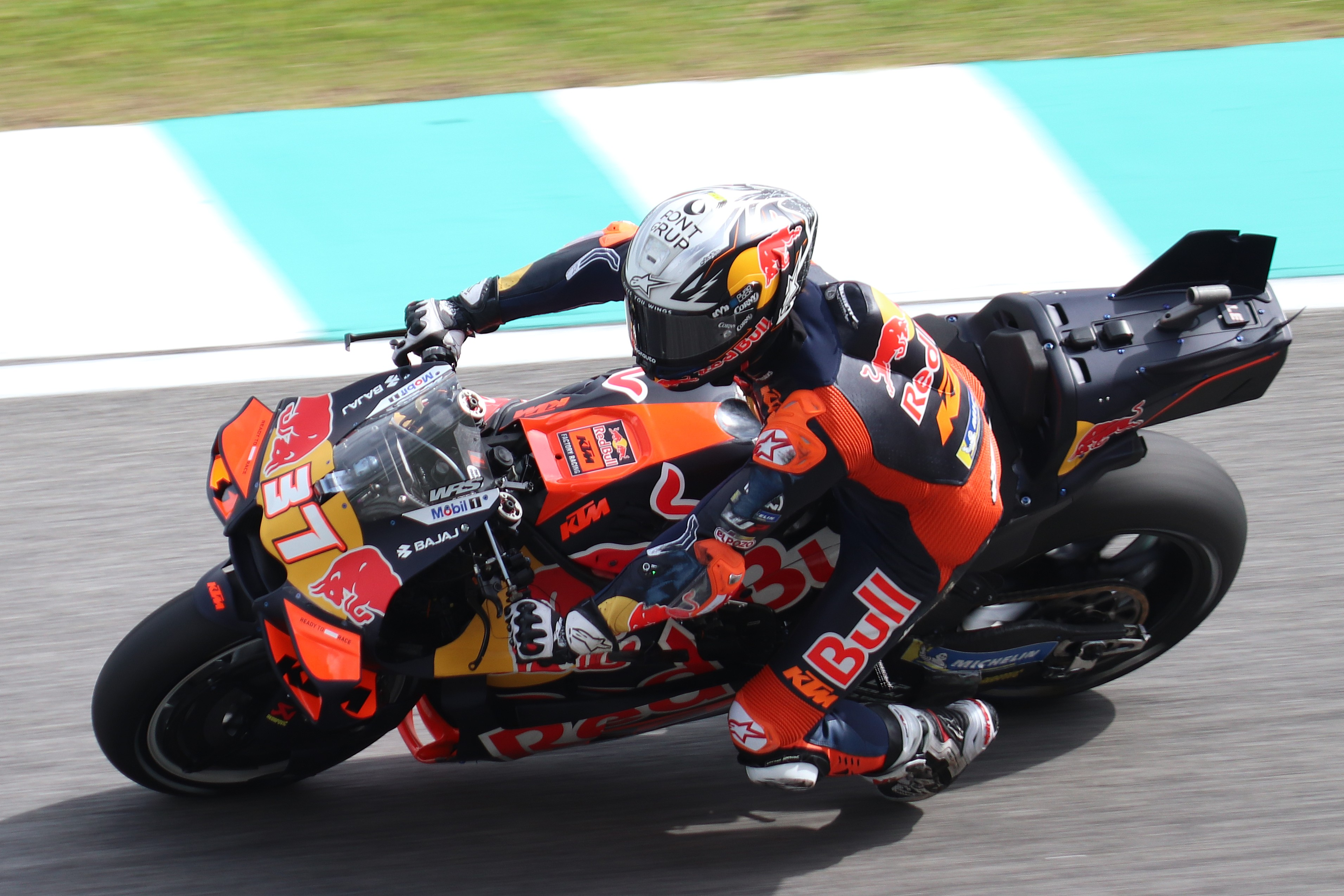
Acosta at the 2025 Malaysian Grand Prix

Ahead of the Italian Grand Prix in Mugello, it was announced that Acosta had signed a multi-year deal with Red Bull KTM Factory Racing for the 2025 season. He scored five podiums to rank fourth in the championship.

Acosta remained with the factory KTM team in 2026. He won the opening sprint race of the season in Thailand, and finished second in the main race, becoming the first KTM rider ever to lead the MotoGP World Championship.

After 15 podiums without a win, Acosta finally claimed his first MotoGP victory at the Austrian Grand Prix on his 56th start in the premier class.

==== Ducati Lenovo Team (2027–) ====
Acosta signed for the factory Ducati team for the 2027 season in place of the outgoing Francesco Bagnaia, where he will be partnered multiple MotoGP world champion and fellow Spaniard Marc Márquez.

== Career statistics ==
=== Career highlights ===
- 2017: 1st, FIM CEV PreMoto3 Championship

=== European Talent Cup ===
==== Races by year ====
(key) (Races in bold indicate pole position, races in italics indicate fastest lap)

Year	Bike	1	2	3	4	5	6	7	8	9	10	11	Pos	Pts
2017	Honda	ALB1	ALB2	CAT	VAL1	EST1	EST2	JER1	JER2	ARA1	ARA2	VAL2; Ret	NC	0

=== FIM CEV Moto3 Junior World Championship ===
==== Races by year ====
(key) (Races in bold indicate pole position, races in italics indicate fastest lap)

Year	Bike	1	2	3	4	5	6	7	8	9	10	11	12	Pos	Pts
2018	KTM	EST	VAL1	VAL2	FRA	CAT1; Ret	CAT2; DNS	ARA; 13	JER1; 27	JER2; 19	ALB	VAL1	VAL2	33rd	3
2019	KTM	EST	VAL1	VAL2	FRA	CAT1	CAT2	ARA	JER1; 4	JER2; 5	ALB; 18	VAL1; 17	VAL2; 6	16th	34
2020	KTM	EST; 2	**POR**; 1	JER1; Ret	JER2; 3	JER3; 3	ARA1; Ret	ARA2; 2	ARA3; 6	**VAL1**; 2	**VAL2**; 1	**VAL3**; 1		3rd	177

=== Red Bull MotoGP Rookies Cup ===
==== Races by year ====
(key) (Races in bold indicate pole position; races in italics indicate fastest lap)

Year	1	2	3	4	5	6	7	8	9	10	11	12	Pos	Pts
2019	JER1; DNS	JER2; DNS	MUG; 2	ASS1; 2	ASS2; 15	SAC1; 1	SAC2; 4	RBR1; 1	RBR2; 5	MIS; 1	ARA1; 4	ARA2; 7	2nd	162
2020	RBR1; 1	RBR1; 1	**RBR2**; 1	**RBR2**; 1	**ARA1**; 1	**ARA1**; 1	ARA2; 2	ARA2; 10	**VAL1**; Ret	**VAL1**; 2	VAL2; 14	VAL2; 3	1st	214

=== Grand Prix motorcycle racing ===
==== By season ====
Season	Class	Motorcycle	Team	Race	Win	Podium	Pole	FLap	Pts	Plcd	WCh
2021	Moto3	KTM	Red Bull KTM Ajo	18	6	8	1	1	259	**1st**	1
2022	Moto2	Kalex	Red Bull KTM Ajo	18	3	5	1	1	177	5th	–
2023	Moto2	Kalex	Red Bull KTM Ajo	20	7	14	3	8	332.5	**1st**	1
2024	MotoGP	KTM	Red Bull GasGas Tech3	19	0	5	1	2	215	6th	–
2025	MotoGP	KTM	Red Bull KTM Factory Racing	22	0	5	0	1	307	4th	–
2026	MotoGP	KTM	Red Bull KTM Factory Racing	19	1	7	1	2	309*	4th*	–
Total				**116**	**17**	**44**	**7**	**15**	**1599.5**		**2**

==== By class ====
Class	Seasons	1st GP	1st Pod	1st Win	Race	Win	Podiums	Pole	FLap	Pts	WChmp
Moto3	2021	2021 Qatar	2021 Qatar	2021 Doha	18	6	8	1	1	259	1
Moto2	2022–2023	2022 Qatar	2022 Italy	2022 Italy	38	10	19	4	9	509.5	1
MotoGP	2024–present	2024 Qatar	2024 Portugal	2026 Austria	60	1	17	2	5	831	0
Total	2021–present				**116**	**17**	**44**	**7**	**15**	**1599.5**	**2**

==== Races by year ====
(key) (Races in bold indicate pole position; races in italics indicate fastest lap; ^{superscript} indicates point-scoring sprint position)

Year	Class	Bike	1	2	3	4	5	6	7	8	9	10	11	12	13	14	15	16	17	18	19	20	21	22	Pos	Pts
2021	Moto3	KTM	QAT; 2	DOH; 1	POR; 1	SPA; 1	FRA; 8	ITA; 8	CAT; 7	GER; 1	NED; 4	STY; 1	AUT; 4	GBR; 11	ARA; Ret	RSM; 7	AME; 8	EMI; 3	ALR; 1	**VAL**; Ret					1st	259
2022	Moto2	Kalex	QAT; 12	INA; 9	ARG; 7	AME; Ret	POR; Ret	SPA; 20	**FRA**; Ret	ITA; 1	CAT; 6	GER; 2	NED	GBR; DNS	AUT; 4	RSM; 6	ARA; 1	JPN; 7	THA; 16	AUS; 2	MAL; Ret	VAL; 1			5th	177
2023	Moto2	Kalex	POR; 1	ARG; 12	AME; 1	SPA; 2	FRA; Ret	ITA; 1	**GER**; 1	NED; 3	**GBR**; 3	**AUT**; 2	CAT; 6	RSM; 1	IND; 1	JPN; 3	INA; 1	AUS; 9^{‡}	THA; 2	MAL; 2	QAT; 8	VAL; 12			1st	332.5
2024	MotoGP	KTM	QAT; 9^{8}	POR; 3^{7}	AME; 2^{4}	SPA; 10^{2}	FRA; Ret^{6}	CAT; 13^{3}	ITA; 5^{3}	NED; Ret	GER; 7	GBR; 9^{5}	AUT; 13	ARA; 3^{3}	RSM; 17^{6}	EMI; Ret^{5}	INA; 2^{6}	**JPN**; Ret	AUS; DNS	THA; 3	MAL; 5^{9}	SLD; 10			6th	215
2025	MotoGP	KTM	THA; 19^{6}	ARG; 8^{9}	AME; Ret^{7}	QAT; 8	SPA; 7	FRA; 4	GBR; 6^{8}	ARA; 4^{5}	ITA; 8	NED; 4^{9}	GER; Ret^{9}	CZE; 3^{2}	AUT; 4^{3}	HUN; 2	CAT; 4^{4}	RSM; Ret^{5}	JPN; 17^{3}	INA; 2	AUS; 5^{3}	MAL; 2^{3}	POR; 3^{2}	VAL; 4^{2}	4th	307
2026	MotoGP	KTM	THA; 2^{1}	BRA; 7^{9}	USA; 3^{8}	SPA; 10	FRA; 5^{4}	**CAT**; Ret^{2}	ITA; 6^{9}	HUN; 2^{2}	CZE; Ret	NED; Ret^{9}	GER; 4^{8}	GBR; 5^{6}	ARA; 2^{4}	RSM; 3^{6}	AUT; 1	JPN; 7	INA; 5^{6}	AUS; C^{5}	MAL; 2^{1}	QAT; 6^{6}	POR	VAL	4th*	309*

^{‡} Half points awarded as less than half of the race distance (but at least three full laps) was completed.
* Season still in progress.

== Records ==
As of 28 February 2026, Acosta holds the following records:

MotoGP

- Youngest rider to have set a fastest lap aged 19 years and 290 days
- Youngest rider to score a podium finish aged 19 years and 304 days
- Youngest-ever rider to win a MotoGP Sprint aged 21 years and 279 days
- First KTM rider ever to lead the World Championship

Moto2

- Youngest Moto2 world champion aged 19 years and 172 days (2023)
- Youngest race winner aged 18 years and 4 days
- Most podiums in a single season: 14 (2023, shared with Marc Márquez, Esteve Rabat, and Johann Zarco)
- Most fastest laps in a single season: 8 (2023, shared with Franco Morbidelli)

Moto3

- Youngest Moto3 world champion aged 17 years and 166 days (2021)

Sporting positions
Preceded by Carlos Tatay	Red Bull MotoGP Rookies Cup; Champion; 2020	Succeeded by David Alonso
