= 2024 Indonesian motorcycle Grand Prix =

Motorcycle races in Central Lombok Regency

(Indonesia) 2024 Indonesian Grand Prix
Race details
- Race 15 of 20 races in the 2024 Grand Prix motorcycle racing season
- Date: 29 September 2024
- Official name: Pertamina Grand Prix of Indonesia
- Location: Pertamina Mandalika International Circuit; Mandalika, Indonesia
- Course: Street circuit; 4.301 km (2.673 mi)

MotoGP
Pole position
Rider	(Spain) Jorge Martín	Ducati
Time	1:29.088	
Fastest lap
Rider	(Italy) Enea Bastianini	Ducati
Time	1:30.539 on lap 20	
Podium
First	(Spain) Jorge Martín	Ducati
Second	(Spain) Pedro Acosta	KTM
Third	(Italy) Francesco Bagnaia	Ducati

Moto2
Pole position
Rider	(Spain) Arón Canet	Kalex
Time	1:33.434	
Fastest lap
Rider	(Spain) Arón Canet	Kalex
Time	1:33.840 on lap 4	
Podium
First	(Spain) Arón Canet	Kalex
Second	(Japan) Ai Ogura	Boscoscuro
Third	(Spain) Alonso López	Boscoscuro

Moto3
Pole position
Rider	(Spain) Iván Ortolá	KTM
Time	1:37.332	
Fastest lap
Rider	(Spain) Daniel Holgado	Gas Gas
Time	1:37.936 on lap 3	
Podium
First	(Colombia) David Alonso	CFMoto
Second	(Spain) Adrián Fernández	Honda
Third	(Spain) David Muñoz	KTM

The 2024 Indonesian motorcycle Grand Prix (officially known as the Pertamina Grand Prix of Indonesia) was the fifteenth round of the 2024 Grand Prix motorcycle racing season. It was held at the Pertamina Mandalika International Circuit in Mandalika on 29 September 2024.

== MotoGP Sprint ==
The MotoGP Sprint was held on 28 September.

Pos.	No.	Rider	Team	Constructor	Laps	Time/Retired	Grid	Points
1	1	(Italy) Francesco Bagnaia	Ducati Lenovo Team	Ducati	13	19:41.354	4	12
2	23	(Italy) Enea Bastianini	Ducati Lenovo Team	Ducati	13	+0.107	5	9
3	93	(Spain) Marc Márquez	Gresini Racing MotoGP	Ducati	13	+1.701	12	7
4	72	(Italy) Marco Bezzecchi	Pertamina Enduro VR46 Racing Team	Ducati	13	+3.072	2	6
5	21	(Italy) Franco Morbidelli	Prima Pramac Racing	Ducati	13	+5.967	9	5
6	31	(Spain) Pedro Acosta	Red Bull GasGas Tech3	KTM	13	+6.210	3	4
7	12	(Spain) Maverick Viñales	Aprilia Racing	Aprilia	13	+6.664	10	3
8	5	(France) Johann Zarco	Castrol Honda LCR	Honda	13	+6.938	7	2
9	49	(Italy) Fabio Di Giannantonio	Pertamina Enduro VR46 Racing Team	Ducati	13	+7.706	8	1
10	89	(Spain) Jorge Martín	Prima Pramac Racing	Ducati	13	+9.104	1	
11	43	(Australia) Jack Miller	Red Bull KTM Factory Racing	KTM	13	+9.618	16	
12	20	(France) Fabio Quartararo	Monster Energy Yamaha MotoGP Team	Yamaha	13	+9.843	6	
13	33	(South Africa) Brad Binder	Red Bull KTM Factory Racing	KTM	13	+11.118	19	
14	73	(Spain) Álex Márquez	Gresini Racing MotoGP	Ducati	13	+12.418	14	
15	42	(Spain) Álex Rins	Monster Energy Yamaha MotoGP Team	Yamaha	13	+12.579	15	
16	41	(Spain) Aleix Espargaró	Aprilia Racing	Aprilia	13	+12.952	13	
17	30	(Japan) Takaaki Nakagami	Idemitsu Honda LCR	Honda	13	+13.351	18	
18	10	(Italy) Luca Marini	Repsol Honda Team	Honda	13	+15.496	17	
19	25	(Spain) Raúl Fernández	Trackhouse Racing	Aprilia	13	+21.895	11	
Ret	37	(Spain) Augusto Fernández	Red Bull GasGas Tech3	KTM	11	Accident	21	
Ret	36	(Spain) Joan Mir	Repsol Honda Team	Honda	1	Accident	20	
Fastest lap: (Italy) Enea Bastianini (Ducati) – 1:30.189 (lap 8)
OFFICIAL MOTOGP SPRINT REPORT

== Race ==
=== MotoGP ===
Pos.	No.	Rider	Team	Constructor	Laps	Time/Retired	Grid	Points
1	89	(Spain) Jorge Martín	Prima Pramac Racing	Ducati	27	41:04.389	1	25
2	31	(Spain) Pedro Acosta	Red Bull GasGas Tech3	KTM	27	+1.404	3	20
3	1	(Italy) Francesco Bagnaia	Ducati Lenovo Team	Ducati	27	+5.595	4	16
4	21	(Italy) Franco Morbidelli	Prima Pramac Racing	Ducati	27	+6.507	9	13
5	72	(Italy) Marco Bezzecchi	Pertamina Enduro VR46 Racing Team	Ducati	27	+6.772	2	11
6	12	(Spain) Maverick Viñales	Aprilia Racing	Aprilia	27	+11.330	10	10
7	20	(France) Fabio Quartararo	Monster Energy Yamaha MotoGP Team	Yamaha	27	+13.203	6	9
8	33	(South Africa) Brad Binder	Red Bull KTM Factory Racing	KTM	27	+14.862	19	8
9	5	(France) Johann Zarco	Castrol Honda LCR	Honda	27	+15.151	7	7
10	25	(Spain) Raúl Fernández	Trackhouse Racing	Aprilia	27	+21.079	11	6
11	42	(Spain) Álex Rins	Monster Energy Yamaha MotoGP Team	Yamaha	27	+33.633	15	5
12	30	(Japan) Takaaki Nakagami	Idemitsu Honda LCR	Honda	27	+43.696 (Note: 16-second penalty for low tyre pressure.)	18	4
Ret	23	(Italy) Enea Bastianini	Ducati Lenovo Team	Ducati	20	Accident	5	
Ret	37	(Spain) Augusto Fernández	Red Bull GasGas Tech3	KTM	19	Retired	21	
Ret	36	(Spain) Joan Mir	Repsol Honda Team	Honda	12	Accident	20	
Ret	93	(Spain) Marc Márquez	Gresini Racing MotoGP	Ducati	11	Technical issue	12	
Ret	49	(Italy) Fabio Di Giannantonio	Pertamina Enduro VR46 Racing Team	Ducati	8	Accident	8	
Ret	41	(Spain) Aleix Espargaró	Aprilia Racing	Aprilia	0	Collision	13	
Ret	73	(Spain) Álex Márquez	Gresini Racing MotoGP	Ducati	0	Collision	14	
Ret	43	(Australia) Jack Miller	Red Bull KTM Factory Racing	KTM	0	Collision	16	
Ret	10	(Italy) Luca Marini	Repsol Honda Team	Honda	0	Collision	17	
Fastest lap: (Italy) Enea Bastianini (Ducati) – 1:30.539 (lap 20)
OFFICIAL MOTOGP RACE REPORT

=== Moto2 ===
Pos.	No.	Rider	Constructor	Laps	Time/Retired	Grid	Points
1	44	(Spain) Arón Canet	Kalex	22	34:41.557	1	25
2	79	(Japan) Ai Ogura	Boscoscuro	22	+6.218	3	20
3	21	(Spain) Alonso López	Boscoscuro	22	+7.613	6	16
4	54	(Spain) Fermín Aldeguer	Boscoscuro	22	+7.797	5	13
5	15	(South Africa) Darryn Binder	Kalex	22	+8.097	13	11
6	16	(United States) Joe Roberts	Kalex	22	+9.823	8	10
7	14	(Italy) Tony Arbolino	Kalex	22	+10.394	7	9
8	18	(Spain) Manuel González	Kalex	22	+11.000	4	8
9	53	(Turkey) Deniz Öncü	Kalex	22	+14.436	11	7
10	24	(Spain) Marcos Ramírez	Kalex	22	+16.895	21	6
11	7	(Belgium) Barry Baltus	Kalex	22	+17.078	12	5
12	13	(Italy) Celestino Vietti	Kalex	22	+18.019	18	4
13	52	(Spain) Jeremy Alcoba	Kalex	22	+18.201	10	3
14	75	(Spain) Albert Arenas	Kalex	22	+18.616	14	2
15	12	(Czech Republic) Filip Salač	Kalex	22	+27.442	23	1
16	22	(Japan) Ayumu Sasaki	Kalex	22	+30.051	22	
17	84	(Netherlands) Zonta van den Goorbergh	Kalex	22	+33.978	20	
18	34	(Indonesia) Mario Aji	Kalex	22	+34.873	24	
19	11	(Spain) Álex Escrig	Forward	22	+38.556	25	
20	43	(Spain) Xavier Artigas	Forward	22	+40.592	28	
21	17	(Spain) Daniel Muñoz	Kalex	22	+47.085	27	
22	96	(United Kingdom) Jake Dixon	Kalex	22	+59.842	2	
Ret	3	(Spain) Sergio García	Boscoscuro	15	Accident	15	
Ret	20	(Andorra) Xavi Cardelús	Kalex	2	Accident	26	
Ret	35	(Thailand) Somkiat Chantra	Kalex	1	Accident	9	
Ret	81	(Australia) Senna Agius	Kalex	0	Accident	16	
Ret	5	(Spain) Jaume Masià	Kalex	0	Accident	17	
DSQ	28	(Spain) Izan Guevara	Kalex	22	Technical infringement	19	
Fastest lap: (Spain) Arón Canet (Kalex) – 1:33.840 (lap 4)
OFFICIAL MOTO2 RACE REPORT

=== Moto3 ===
Pos.	No.	Rider	Constructor	Laps	Time/Retired	Grid	Points
1	80	(Colombia) David Alonso	CFMoto	20	32:57.410	5	25
2	31	(Spain) Adrián Fernández	Honda	20	+0.085	4	20
3	64	(Spain) David Muñoz	KTM	20	+0.225	13	16
4	36	(Spain) Ángel Piqueras	Honda	20	+0.664	9	13
5	58	(Italy) Luca Lunetta	Honda	20	+0.835	6	11
6	96	(Spain) Daniel Holgado	Gas Gas	20	+0.862	14	10
7	24	(Japan) Tatsuki Suzuki	Husqvarna	20	+1.300	7	9
8	66	(Australia) Joel Kelso	KTM	20	+1.835	8	8
9	48	(Spain) Iván Ortolá	KTM	20	+16.664	1	7
10	10	(Italy) Nicola Carraro	KTM	20	+16.674	20	6
11	99	(Spain) José Antonio Rueda	KTM	20	+16.770	10	5
12	18	(Italy) Matteo Bertelle	Honda	20	+16.807	23	4
13	19	(United Kingdom) Scott Ogden	Honda	20	+17.005	12	3
14	78	(Spain) Joel Esteban	CFMoto	20	+17.244	22	2
15	82	(Italy) Stefano Nepa	KTM	20	+23.804	11	1
16	12	(Australia) Jacob Roulstone	Gas Gas	20	+26.124	19	
17	6	(Japan) Ryusei Yamanaka	KTM	20	+39.312	17	
18	55	(Switzerland) Noah Dettwiler	KTM	20	+57.340	25	
Ret	72	(Japan) Taiyo Furusato	Honda	17	Accident	3	
Ret	95	(Netherlands) Collin Veijer	Husqvarna	11	Accident	2	
Ret	54	(Italy) Riccardo Rossi	KTM	10	Accident	18	
Ret	85	(Spain) Xabi Zurutuza	KTM	10	Accident	26	
Ret	5	(Thailand) Tatchakorn Buasri	Honda	4	Accident	24	
Ret	93	(Indonesia) Fadillah Arbi Aditama	Honda	4	Accident	21	
Ret	7	(Italy) Filippo Farioli	Honda	2	Accident	16	
Ret	22	(Spain) David Almansa	Honda	2	Accident	15	
Fastest lap: (Spain) Daniel Holgado (Gas Gas) – 1:37.936 (lap 3)
OFFICIAL MOTO3 RACE REPORT

== Championship standings after the race ==
Below are the standings for the top five riders, constructors, and teams after the round.

=== MotoGP ===
Riders' Championship standings

	Pos.	Rider	Points
	1	(Spain) Jorge Martín	366
	2	(Italy) Francesco Bagnaia	345
	3	(Italy) Enea Bastianini	291
	4	(Spain) Marc Márquez	288
1	5	(Spain) Pedro Acosta	181

Constructors' Championship standings

Pos.	Constructor	Points
1	(Italy) Ducati	537
2	(Austria) KTM	263
3	(Italy) Aprilia	247
4	(Japan) Yamaha	93
5	(Japan) Honda	51

Teams' Championship standings

	Pos.	Team	Points
	1	(Italy) Ducati Lenovo Team	599
	2	(Italy) Prima Pramac Racing	443
	3	(Italy) Gresini Racing MotoGP	402
	4	(Italy) Aprilia Racing	276
1	5	(Italy) Pertamina Enduro VR46 Racing Team	229

=== Moto2 ===
Riders' Championship standings

	Pos.	Rider	Points
	1	(Japan) Ai Ogura	208
	2	(Spain) Sergio García	166
3	3	(Spain) Arón Canet	156
	4	(Spain) Alonso López	156
2	5	(United States) Joe Roberts	153

Constructors' Championship standings

Pos.	Constructor	Points
1	(Germany) Kalex	317
2	(Italy) Boscoscuro	308
3	(Switzerland) Forward	6

Teams' Championship standings

	Pos.	Team	Points
	1	(Spain) MT Helmets – MSi	374
	2	(Italy) Beta Tools Speed Up	302
	3	(United States) OnlyFans American Racing Team	232
	4	(Italy) QJmotor Gresini Moto2	193
1	5	(Finland) Red Bull KTM Ajo	165

=== Moto3 ===
Riders' Championship standings

	Pos.	Rider	Points
	1	(Colombia) David Alonso	296
	2	(Spain) Daniel Holgado	199
1	3	(Spain) Iván Ortolá	191
1	4	(Netherlands) Collin Veijer	189
1	5	(Spain) David Muñoz	133

Constructors' Championship standings

	Pos.	Constructor	Points
	1	(China) CFMoto	296
	2	(Austria) KTM	267
	3	(Sweden) Husqvarna	215
1	4	(Japan) Honda	212
1	5	(Spain) Gas Gas	204

Teams' Championship standings

	Pos.	Team	Points
	1	(Spain) CFMoto Gaviota Aspar Team	340
	2	(Spain) MT Helmets – MSi	277
	3	(Germany) Liqui Moly Husqvarna Intact GP	261
1	4	(Luxembourg) Leopard Racing	252
1	5	(France) Red Bull GasGas Tech3	249

Previous race: 2024 Emilia Romagna Grand Prix	FIM Grand Prix World Championship; 2024 season	Next race: 2024 Japanese Grand Prix
Previous race: 2023 Indonesian Grand Prix	Indonesian motorcycle Grand Prix	Next race: 2025 Indonesian Grand Prix
