= 2020 Red Bull MotoGP Rookies Cup =

Motorcycle racing competition

2020 Red Bull MotoGP Rookies Cup
Previous:	2019	Next:	2021

The 2020 Red Bull MotoGP Rookies Cup was the fourteenth season of the Red Bull MotoGP Rookies Cup. The season, for the eighth year contested by the riders on equal KTM 250cc 4-stroke Moto3 bikes, was held over 12 races in six meetings on the Grand Prix motorcycle racing calendar, beginning at Spielberg on 15 August and ending on 15 November at the Circuit Ricardo Tormo.

== Calendar ==
2020 calendar
Round	Date	Circuit	Pole position	Fastest lap	Race winner	Sources
1	15 August	(Austria) Spielberg	(Spain) Daniel Muñoz	(Spain) David Muñoz	(Spain) Pedro Acosta	
1	16 August	(Austria) Spielberg	(Spain) Daniel Muñoz	(France) Gabin Planques	(Spain) Pedro Acosta	
2	22 August	(Austria) Spielberg	(Spain) Pedro Acosta	(Spain) Iván Ortolá	(Spain) Pedro Acosta	
2	23 August	(Austria) Spielberg	(Spain) Pedro Acosta	(Spain) David Muñoz	(Spain) Pedro Acosta	
3	17 October	Aragon	(Spain) Pedro Acosta	(Spain) David Salvador	(Spain) Pedro Acosta	
3	18 October	Aragon	(Spain) Pedro Acosta	(Spain) David Salvador	(Spain) Pedro Acosta	
4	24 October	Aragon	(Spain) Daniel Muñoz	(Spain) Izan Guevara	(Spain) Iván Ortolá	
4	25 October	Aragon	(Spain) Daniel Muñoz	(Spain) Iván Ortolá	(Colombia) David Alonso	
5	7 November	(Valencian Community) Valencia	(Spain) Pedro Acosta	(Spain) Álex Escrig	(Spain) David Salvador	
5	8 November	(Valencian Community) Valencia	(Spain) Pedro Acosta	(Spain) David Salvador	(Spain) Daniel Holgado	
6	14 November	(Valencian Community) Valencia	(Spain) Daniel Holgado	(Spain) David Muñoz	(Spain) David Muñoz	
6	15 November	(Valencian Community) Valencia	(Spain) Daniel Holgado	(Spain) Álex Escrig	(Spain) David Muñoz	

== Entry list ==
2020 entry list
No.	Rider	Rounds
5	(Thailand) Tatchakorn Buasri	All
6	(Germany) Phillip Tonn	All
7	(Spain) Daniel Muñoz	All
11	(Spain) Álex Escrig	All
13	(Japan) Sho Nishimura	1–3, 6
19	(United Kingdom) Scott Ogden	All
23	(Spain) Álex Millán	All
24	(Spain) Iván Ortolá	All
28	(Italy) Matteo Bertelle	1, 3–5
29	(Australia) Billy Van Eerde	All
33	(Spain) Izan Guevara	2–6
34	(Indonesia) Mario Aji	All
37	(Spain) Pedro Acosta	All
38	(Spain) David Salvador	All
39	(France) Bartholomé Perrin	1–5
48	(France) Gabin Planques	1–4
55	(Switzerland) Noah Dettwiler	1–5
58	(Italy) Luca Lunetta	1–5
64	(Spain) David Muñoz	All
80	(Colombia) David Alonso	All
84	(Netherlands) Zonta van den Goorbergh	All
88	(Russia) Artem Maraev	All
89	(Spain) Marcos Uriarte	All
95	(Netherlands) Collin Veijer	All
96	(Spain) Daniel Holgado	All
97	(United States) Rocco Landers	1–3

== Championship standings ==
Points were awarded to the top fifteen riders, provided the rider finished the race.

Position	**1st**	**2nd**	**3rd**	**4th**	**5th**	**6th**	**7th**	**8th**	**9th**	**10th**	**11th**	**12th**	**13th**	**14th**	**15th**
Points	25	20	16	13	11	10	9	8	7	6	5	4	3	2	1

Pos.	Rider	RBR (Austria)		RBR (Austria)		ARA (Aragon)		ARA (Aragon)		VAL (Valencian Community)		VAL (Valencian Community)		Pts
1	(Spain) Pedro Acosta	1	1	**1**	**1**	**1**	**1**	2	10	**Ret**	**2**	14	3	214
2	(Spain) David Muñoz	2	2	3	8	Ret	Ret	4	9	Ret	3	1	1	150
3	(Spain) Iván Ortolá	Ret	6	5	2	3	3	1	3	Ret	6	2	10	150
4	(Colombia) David Alonso	4	4	4	4	5	2	3	1	Ret	4	Ret	Ret	137
5	(Spain) Daniel Holgado	3	3	2	Ret	2	Ret	Ret	4	13	1	**Ret**	**2**	133
6	(Spain) David Salvador	5	16	7	5	4	5	5	8	1	7	3	Ret	124
7	(Spain) Daniel Muñoz	**18**	**5**	6	3	7	6	**6**	**2**	7	Ret	10	Ret	101
8	(Netherlands) Zonta van den Goorbergh	9	8	12	6	18	8	7	12	4	11	9	9	82
9	(Spain) Izan Guevara			18	11	9	4	10	5	10	5	Ret	4	72
10	(Netherlands) Collin Veijer	14	10	10	7	Ret	9	Ret	7	Ret	8	6	6	67
11	(Indonesia) Mario Aji	13	19	14	12	12	11	11	11	2	10	5	Ret	65
12	(Spain) Marcos Uriarte	12	17	DNS	DNS	15	10	9	6	Ret	9	4	5	59
13	(Australia) Billy Van Eerde	15	7	11	Ret	6	7	8	Ret	3	Ret	DNS	DNS	58
14	(Spain) Álex Escrig	Ret	15	13	Ret	13	Ret	14	16	5	12	7	7	42
15	(Spain) Álex Millán	10	22	15	10	21	13	Ret	15	9	14	8	8	42
16	(Italy) Matteo Bertelle	8	9			8	Ret	13	14	6	13			41
17	(Switzerland) Noah Dettwiler	6	14	8	9	14	14	18	20	8	Ret			39
18	(United Kingdom) Scott Ogden	11	13	DNS	DNS	11	12	12	13	Ret	Ret	11	11	34
19	(France) Gabin Planques	7	11	9	14	Ret	15	19	18					24
20	(Thailand) Tatchakorn Buasri	Ret	DNS	WD	WD	10	17	15	Ret	11	17	12	Ret	16
21	(Russia) Artem Maraev	Ret	20	17	13	16	16	17	17	14	16	13	14	10
22	(Japan) Sho Nishimura	19	12	16	Ret	WD	WD					Ret	12	8
23	(Italy) Luca Lunetta	Ret	18	Ret	15	19	18	16	19	12	15			6
24	(Germany) Phillip Tonn	Ret	21	Ret	18	17	Ret	Ret	21	Ret	Ret	Ret	13	3
25	(France) Bartholomé Perrin	17	24	19	16	20	19	20	22	Ret	Ret			0
26	(United States) Rocco Landers	16	23	Ret	17	WD	WD							0
Pos.	Rider	RBR (Austria)		RBR (Austria)		ARA (Aragon)		ARA (Aragon)		VAL (Valencian Community)		VAL (Valencian Community)		Pts

Colour	Result
Gold	Winner
Silver	Second place
Bronze	Third place
Green	Points classification
Blue	Non-points classification
Blue	Non-classified finish (NC)
Purple	Retired, not classified (Ret)
Red	Did not qualify (DNQ)
Red	Did not pre-qualify (DNPQ)
Black	Disqualified (DSQ)
White	Did not start (DNS)
White	Withdrew (WD)
White	Race cancelled (C)
Blank	Did not practice (DNP)
Blank	Did not arrive (DNA)
Blank	Excluded (EX)

**Bold** – Pole position
Italics – Fastest lap
