= Carlos Tatay =

Spanish motorcycle racer

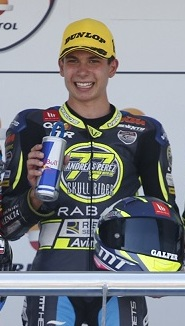
- Tatay in 2019
- Nationality: Spanish
- Born: 7 May 2003 (age 23); Valencia, Spain
Motorcycle racing career statistics
Moto2 World Championship
| Active years | 2023 |
| Manufacturers | Kalex |
Starts / Wins / Podiums / Poles / F. laps / Points; 2 / 0 / 0 / 0 / 0 / 0
Moto3 World Championship
| Active years | 2019–2022 |
| Manufacturers | KTM, CFMoto |
| 2022 championship position | 15th (87 pts) |
Starts / Wins / Podiums / Poles / F. laps / Points; 51 / 0 / 1 / 1 / 0 / 161

Carlos Tatay Vila (born 7 May 2003) is a Spanish former motorcycle racer, and the Red Bull MotoGP Rookies Cup champion of 2019. In July 2023, Tatay suffered multiple injuries, including spinal cord damage, in a serious crash at the Algarve International Circuit. As of 2026, he remains in a wheelchair, but is receiving physiotherapy to recover.

Tatay last competed in the 2023 FIM Moto2 European Championship for the Pertamina Mandalika SAG Team. He previously raced in the Moto3 class with Prüstel GP and CFMoto, securing a podium finish at the 2022 Indonesian Grand Prix by finishing third, from pole position. Following his recovery, Tatay stated that he aims to enter Dakar Rally with a specialized car, built to accommodate for his mobility needs.

== Career ==
=== Early career ===
Tatay debuted in the FIM CEV Moto3 Junior World Championship mid-way through the 2018 season, ultimately finishing in 24th place. He also took part in the Red Bull MotoGP Rookies Cup in 2018, winning in just his second race, and finishing the season in fifth place with four podiums and 148 points total.

In 2019, Tatay again completed double-duty in both series. In CEV Moto3, he won four races and finished second in the championship, while in the 2019 Red Bull MotoGP Rookies Cup, Tatay won four races, finishing on the podium in nine of the first ten races, clinching the championship win. Having secured the championship at the penultimate round in Misano, Tatay missed the season finale double-header in Aragon, as he was promoted to a wildcard slot in the Moto3 world championship race there.

=== Moto3 World Championship ===
Tatay made his grand prix debut in 2019 as a wildcard rider in the Catalan grand prix, where he finished 12th. He repeated this result in his second entry at the Aragon grand prix. His point-scoring performances in his first two debut races earned him a full-season in the 2020 championship with Avintia.

Riding full time in the 2020 Moto3 World Championship for the Avintia Esponsorama Racing team as the lone rider, Tatay had an up and down year. He finished in the points six times, twice in the top-ten (France and Valencia), but also crashed out twice (Jerez and Barcelona). His season's best result was a sixth place finish in Valencia, overall scoring 26 points, finishing 22nd in the standings.

Staying with the Avintia Esponsorama team for the 2021 season, this time partnered by Niccolò Antonelli, Tatay basically replicated his 2020 season: he finished with six point scoring races, a season high best result of sixth (this time in Jerez), and 21st in the standings, with 40 points. Tatay was not given a new contract by the team following the season.

In 2022, Tatay moved to the CFMoto Prüstel GP team. He finished 15th in the championship, taking his first pole and podium at the 2022 Indonesian motorcycle Grand Prix.

=== FIM Moto2 European Championship ===
==== 2023 ====
In 2023, Tatay competed in the FIM Moto2 European Championship for the Pertamina Mandalika SAG Team. On June 4, Tatay took his first victory at Jerez. On July 2, Tatay sustained serious injuries in a high-speed crash at Portimao, with an unknown prognosis. In October, it was revealed that Tatay, using a wheelchair and suffering from an incomplete spinal cord injury, is struggling to pay his hospital bills as the Spanish and Valencian motorcycle federations are involved in a legal battle over insurance coverage.

== Personal life ==
Tatay comes from Alaquàs in the Valencian Community. He is an only child. He cites his racing idols as Marc Márquez, Maverick Viñales, Johann Zarco and Aleix Espargaró.

== Career statistics ==
=== European Talent Cup ===
==== Races by year ====
(key) (Races in bold indicate pole position, races in italics indicate fastest lap)

| Year | Bike | 1 | 2 | 3 | 4 | 5 | 6 | 7 | 8 | 9 | 10 | 11 | Pos | Pts |
|---|---|---|---|---|---|---|---|---|---|---|---|---|---|---|
| 2017 | Honda | ALB1 | ALB2 | CAT | VAL1 | EST1 | EST2 | JER1; Ret | JER2; 3 | ARA1 | ARA2 | VAL2 | 20th | 16 |
| 2018 | Honda | EST1; 5 | EST2; Ret | VAL1; 5 | VAL2; Ret | CAT | ARA1 | ARA2 | JER1 | JER2 | ALB | VAL | 23rd | 22 |

=== Red Bull MotoGP Rookies Cup ===
==== Races by year ====
(key) (Races in bold indicate pole position; races in italics indicate fastest lap)

| Year | 1 | 2 | 3 | 4 | 5 | 6 | 7 | 8 | 9 | 10 | 11 | 12 | Pos | Pts |
|---|---|---|---|---|---|---|---|---|---|---|---|---|---|---|
| 2018 | **JER1**; 2 | **JER2**; 1 | MUG; 4 | ASS1; 8 | ASS2; Ret | SAC1; 9 | SAC2; 7 | RBR1; 6 | RBR2; 6 | MIS; 6 | ARA1; 3 | ARA2; 2 | 5th | 148 |
| 2019 | JER1; 2 | JER2; 1 | MUG; 1 | **ASS1**; 1 | **ASS2**; 1 | SAC1; 3 | SAC2; 2 | RBR1; 14 | RBR2; 2 | MIS; 3 | ARA1 | ARA2 | 1st | 194 |

=== FIM CEV Moto3 Junior World Championship ===
==== Races by year ====
(key) (Races in bold indicate pole position, races in italics indicate fastest lap)

| Year | Bike | 1 | 2 | 3 | 4 | 5 | 6 | 7 | 8 | 9 | 10 | 11 | 12 | Pos | Pts |
|---|---|---|---|---|---|---|---|---|---|---|---|---|---|---|---|
| 2018 | KTM | EST | VAL1 | VAL2 | FRA | CAT1; 14 | CAT2; DNS | ARA; 20 | JER1; Ret | JER2; 7 | ALB; 16 | VAL1; Ret | VAL2; Ret | 24th | 11 |
| 2019 | KTM | EST; 6 | VAL1; Ret | VAL2; 25 | FRA; 6 | CAT1; 1 | CAT2; 4 | ARA; 7 | **JER1**; 1 | **JER2**; 1 | ALB; 3 | VAL1; 7 | VAL2; 1 | 2nd | 167 |

=== FIM Moto2 European Championship ===
==== By year ====
| Year | Bike | 1 | 2 | 3 | 4 | 5 | 6 | 7 | 8 | 9 | 10 | 11 | Pos | Pts |
|---|---|---|---|---|---|---|---|---|---|---|---|---|---|---|
| 2023 | Kalex | EST1; 2 | EST2; Ret | VAL1; 3 | **JER1**; 1 | POR1; Ret | POR2; DNS | CAT1 | CAT2 | ARA1 | ARA2 | VAL2 | 9th | 61 |

=== Grand Prix motorcycle racing ===
==== By season ====
| Season | Class | Motorcycle | Team | Race | Win | Podium | Pole | FLap | Pts | Plcd |
|---|---|---|---|---|---|---|---|---|---|---|
| 2019 | Moto3 | KTM | Fundacion Andreas Perez 77 | 2 | 0 | 0 | 0 | 0 | 8 | 30th |
| 2020 | Moto3 | KTM | Reale Avintia Racing | 15 | 0 | 0 | 0 | 0 | 26 | 22nd |
| 2021 | Moto3 | KTM | Avintia Esponsorama Moto3 | 14 | 0 | 0 | 0 | 0 | 40 | 21st |
| 2022 | Moto3 | CFMoto | CFMoto Racing Prüstel GP | 20 | 0 | 1 | 1 | 0 | 87 | 15th |
| 2023 | Moto2 | Kalex | American Racing | 2 | 0 | 0 | 0 | 0 | 0 | 34th |
| Total | | | | **53** | **0** | **1** | **1** | **0** | **161** | |

==== By class ====
| Class | Seasons | 1st GP | 1st Pod | Race | Win | Podiums | Pole | FLap | Pts | WChmp |
|---|---|---|---|---|---|---|---|---|---|---|
| Moto2 | 2023 | 2023 Germany | | 2 | 0 | 0 | 0 | 0 | 0 | 0 |
| Moto3 | 2019–2022 | 2019 Catalunya | 2022 Indonesia | 51 | 0 | 1 | 1 | 0 | 161 | 0 |
| Total | 2019–2023 | | | **53** | **0** | **1** | **1** | **0** | **161** | **0** |

==== Races by year ====
(key) (Races in bold indicate pole position; races in italics indicate fastest lap)

| Year | Class | Bike | 1 | 2 | 3 | 4 | 5 | 6 | 7 | 8 | 9 | 10 | 11 | 12 | 13 | 14 | 15 | 16 | 17 | 18 | 19 | 20 | Pos | Pts |
|---|---|---|---|---|---|---|---|---|---|---|---|---|---|---|---|---|---|---|---|---|---|---|---|---|
| 2019 | Moto3 | KTM | QAT | ARG | AME | SPA | FRA | ITA | CAT; 12 | NED | GER | CZE | AUT | GBR | RSM | ARA; 12 | THA | JPN | AUS | MAL | VAL; DNS | | 30th | 8 |
| 2020 | Moto3 | KTM | QAT; 21 | SPA; Ret | ANC; 13 | CZE; 18 | AUT; 22 | STY; 21 | RSM; 15 | EMI; 19 | CAT; Ret | FRA; 10 | ARA; 12 | TER; 17 | EUR; 6 | VAL; 21 | POR; 14 | | | | | | 22nd | 26 |
| 2021 | Moto3 | KTM | QAT; 12 | DOH; 21 | POR; 17 | SPA; 6 | FRA; Ret | ITA; Ret | CAT | GER | NED | STY; DNS | AUT; 16 | GBR; 10 | ARA; Ret | RSM; 8 | AME; 18 | EMI; Ret | ALR; 12 | VAL; 8 | | | 21st | 40 |
| 2022 | Moto3 | CFMoto | QAT; Ret | **INA**; 3 | ARG; 8 | AME; 8 | POR; 6 | SPA; Ret | FRA; 6 | ITA; 19 | CAT; 6 | GER; Ret | NED; 14 | GBR; 10 | AUT; Ret | RSM; Ret | ARA; 9 | JPN; Ret | THA; 13 | AUS; 12 | MAL; Ret | VAL; 13 | 15th | 87 |
| 2023 | Moto2 | Kalex | POR | ARG | AME | SPA | FRA | ITA | GER; 19 | NED; 17 | GBR | AUT | CAT | RSM | IND | JPN | INA | AUS | THA | MAL | QAT | VAL | 34th | 0 |

Sporting positions
| Preceded by Can Öncü | Red Bull MotoGP Rookies Cup; Champion; 2019 | Succeeded by Pedro Acosta |
