= 2025 British motorcycle Grand Prix =

Motorcycle races in Silverstone

(United Kingdom) 2025 British Grand Prix
Race details
- Race 7 of 22 races in the 2025 Grand Prix motorcycle racing season
- Date: 25 May 2025
- Official name: Tissot Grand Prix of the United Kingdom
- Location: Silverstone Circuit; Silverstone, United Kingdom
- Course: Permanent racing facility; 5.900 km (3.666 mi)

MotoGP
Pole position
Rider	(France) Fabio Quartararo	Yamaha
Time	1:57.233	
Fastest lap
Rider	(Italy) Marco Bezzecchi	Aprilia
Time	1:59.770 on lap 9	
Podium
First	(Italy) Marco Bezzecchi	Aprilia
Second	(France) Johann Zarco	Honda
Third	(Spain) Marc Márquez	Ducati

Moto2
Pole position
Rider	(Spain) Arón Canet	Kalex
Time	2:02.482	
Fastest lap
Rider	(Spain) Manuel González	Kalex
Time	2:04.034 on lap 3	
Podium
First	(Australia) Senna Agius	Kalex
Second	(Brazil) Diogo Moreira	Kalex
Third	(Colombia) David Alonso	Kalex

Moto3
Pole position
Rider	(Spain) José Antonio Rueda (Note: Rueda was given a back of the grid penalty for riding slowly on the racing line, but retains the pole position statistic despite starting the race from 26th position. Álvaro Carpe started the race from the first grid slot.)	KTM
Time	2:09.449	
Fastest lap
Rider	(Japan) Taiyo Furusato	Honda
Time	2:10.794 on lap 14	
Podium
First	(Spain) José Antonio Rueda	KTM
Second	(Spain) Máximo Quiles	KTM
Third	(Italy) Luca Lunetta	Honda

The 2025 British motorcycle Grand Prix (officially known as the Tissot Grand Prix of the United Kingdom) was the seventh round of the 2025 Grand Prix motorcycle racing season. All races were held at the Silverstone Circuit in Silverstone on 25 May 2025.

Ai Ogura was declared unfit to finish the weekend of the Grand Prix following Friday's turn 2 crash at Silverstone. Trackhouse confirmed ahead of MotoGP FP2 on Saturday morning that Ogura has suffered a potential fracture to the top of his right tibia.

Red Bull KTM Ajo Moto2 rider Collin Veijer will not compete in this weekend's British Grand Prix after sustaining a serious arm injury during training in the Netherlands on Monday.

== Practice session ==
=== MotoGP ===
==== Combined Free Practice 1-2 ====
Practice times (written in bold) are the fastest times in the session.

Fastest session lap

Pos.	No.	Biker	Team	Constructor	Practice times	
Pos.	No.	Biker	Team	Constructor	P1	P2
1	93	(Spain) Marc Márquez	Ducati Lenovo Team	Ducati	**1:58.702**	1:59.178
2	20	(France) Fabio Quartararo	Monster Energy Yamaha MotoGP Team	Yamaha	1:59.423	**1:59.032**
3	21	(Italy) Franco Morbidelli	Pertamina Enduro VR46 Racing Team	Ducati	**1:59.067**	1:59.984
4	73	(Spain) Álex Márquez	BK8 Gresini Racing MotoGP	Ducati	**1:59.123**	1:59.424
5	72	(Italy) Marco Bezzecchi	Aprilia Racing	Aprilia	**1:59.164**	2:00.015
6	43	(Australia) Jack Miller	Prima Pramac Yamaha MotoGP	Yamaha	**1:59.187**	1:59.980
7	12	(Spain) Maverick Viñales	Red Bull KTM Tech3	KTM	**1:59.222**	1:59.531
8	63	(Italy) Francesco Bagnaia	Ducati Lenovo Team	Ducati	**1:59.544**	1:59.756
9	42	(Spain) Álex Rins	Monster Energy Yamaha MotoGP Team	Yamaha	**1:59.581**	2:00.514
10	54	(Spain) Fermín Aldeguer	BK8 Gresini Racing MotoGP	Ducati	1:59.708	**1:59.590**
11	37	(Spain) Pedro Acosta	Red Bull KTM Factory Racing	KTM	**1:59.631**	2:00.284
12	49	(Italy) Fabio Di Giannantonio	Pertamina Enduro VR46 Racing Team	Ducati	**1:59.716**	2:00.111
13	36	(Spain) Joan Mir	Honda HRC Castrol	Honda	**1:59.739**	1:59.865
14	10	(Italy) Luca Marini	Honda HRC Castrol	Honda	1:59.833	**1:59.758**
15	5	(France) Johann Zarco	Castrol Honda LCR	Honda	**1:59.806**	2:00.089
16	25	(Spain) Raúl Fernández	Trackhouse MotoGP Team	Aprilia	2:00.309	**2:00.034**
17	33	(South Africa) Brad Binder	Red Bull KTM Factory Racing	KTM	**2:00.303**	2:00.772
18	41	(Spain) Aleix Espargaró	Honda HRC Test Team	Honda	2:01.329	**2:00.328**
19	23	(Italy) Enea Bastianini	Red Bull KTM Tech3	KTM	2:00.797	**2:00.542**
20	88	(Portugal) Miguel Oliveira	Prima Pramac Yamaha MotoGP	Yamaha	2:01.071	**2:00.819**
21	32	(Italy) Lorenzo Savadori	Aprilia Racing	Aprilia	2:01.726	**2:01.485**
22	35	(Thailand) Somkiat Chantra	IDEMITSU Honda LCR	Honda	**2:01.645**	2:01.780
OFFICIAL MOTOGP COMBINED PRACTICE TIMES REPORT

==== Practice ====
The top 10 riders (written in bold) qualified for Q2.

Fastest session lap

Pos.	No.	Biker	Team	Constructor	
Pos.	No.	Biker	Team	Constructor	Time results
1	73	**(Spain) Álex Márquez**	**BK8 Gresini Racing MotoGP**	**Ducati**	**1:57.295**
2	20	**(France) Fabio Quartararo**	**Monster Energy Yamaha MotoGP Team**	**Yamaha**	**1:57.342**
3	43	**(Australia) Jack Miller**	**Prima Pramac Yamaha MotoGP**	**Yamaha**	**1:57.642**
4	93	**(Spain) Marc Márquez**	**Ducati Lenovo Team**	**Ducati**	**1:57.655**
5	72	**(Italy) Marco Bezzecchi**	**Aprilia Racing**	**Aprilia**	**1:57.667**
6	49	**(Italy) Fabio Di Giannantonio**	**Pertamina Enduro VR46 Racing Team**	**Ducati**	**1:57.699**
7	63	**(Italy) Francesco Bagnaia**	**Ducati Lenovo Team**	**Ducati**	**1:57.703**
8	5	**(France) Johann Zarco**	**CASTROL Honda LCR**	**Honda**	**1:57.741**
9	42	**(Spain) Álex Rins**	**Monster Energy Yamaha MotoGP Team**	**Yamaha**	**1:57.819**
10	54	**(Spain) Fermín Aldeguer**	**BK8 Gresini Racing MotoGP**	**Ducati**	**1:57.821**
11	37	(Spain) Pedro Acosta	Red Bull KTM Factory Racing	KTM	1:57.865
12	36	(Spain) Joan Mir	Honda HRC Castrol	Honda	1:57.917
13	88	(Portugal) Miguel Oliveira	Prima Pramac Yamaha MotoGP	Yamaha	1:57.999
14	12	(Spain) Maverick Viñales	Red Bull KTM Tech3	KTM	1:58.062
15	21	(Italy) Franco Morbidelli	Pertamina Enduro VR46 Racing Team	Ducati	1:58.103
16	10	(Italy) Luca Marini	Honda HRC Castrol	Honda	1:58.151
17	33	(South Africa) Brad Binder	Red Bull KTM Factory Racing	KTM	1:58.325
18	23	(Italy) Enea Bastianini	Red Bull KTM Tech3	KTM	1:58.670
19	25	(Spain) Raúl Fernández	Trackhouse MotoGP Team	Aprilia	1:58.725
20	32	(Italy) Lorenzo Savadori	Aprilia Racing	Aprilia	1:59.648
21	41	(Spain) Aleix Espargaró	Honda HRC Test Team	Honda	1:59.322
22	35	(Thailand) Somkiat Chantra	IDEMITSU Honda LCR	Honda	1:59.648
OFFICIAL MOTOGP PRACTICE TIMES REPORT

=== Moto2 ===
==== Combined Practice 1-2 ====
Fastest session lap

Pos.	No.	Biker	Team	Constructor	Practice times	
Pos.	No.	Biker	Team	Constructor	P1	P2
1	18	(Spain) Manuel González	Liqui Moly Dynavolt Intact GP	Kalex	**2:02.599**	2:05.630
2	96	(United Kingdom) Jake Dixon	Elf Marc VDS Racing Team	Boscoscuro	2:03.410	2:06.223
3	44	(Spain) Arón Canet	Fantic Racing Lino Sonego	Kalex	2:03.461	2:06.230
4	81	(Australia) Senna Agius	Liqui Moly Dynavolt Intact GP	Kalex	2:03.480	2:06.463
5	12	(Czech Republic) Filip Salač	Elf Marc VDS Racing Team	Boscoscuro	2:03.540	2:09.392
6	9	(Spain) Jorge Navarro	Klint Forward Factory Team	Forward	2:03.581	2:09.123
7	80	(Colombia) David Alonso	CFMoto Gaviota Aspar Team	Kalex	2:03.604	2:06.535
8	10	(Brazil) Diogo Moreira	Italtrans Racing Team	Kalex	2:03.631	2:06.991
9	53	(Turkey) Deniz Öncü	Red Bull KTM Ajo	Kalex	2:03.858	**2:05.220**
10	75	(Spain) Albert Arenas	Italjet Gresini Moto2	Kalex	2:04.001	2:07.614
11	27	(Spain) Daniel Holgado	CFMoto Gaviota Aspar Team	Kalex	2:04.097	2:08.117
12	28	(Spain) Izan Guevara	Blu Cru Pramac Yamaha Moto2	Boscoscuro	2:04.129	2:06.435
13	7	(Belgium) Barry Baltus	Fantic Racing Lino Sonego	Kalex	2:04.196	2:10.677
14	24	(Spain) Marcos Ramírez	OnlyFans American Racing Team	Kalex	2:04.249	2:06.435
15	16	(United States) Joe Roberts	OnlyFans American Racing Team	Kalex	2:04.262	2:09.014
16	13	(Italy) Celestino Vietti	Beta Tools SpeedRS Team	Boscoscuro	2:04.295	2:09.449
17	21	(Spain) Alonso López	Beta Tools SpeedRS Team	Boscoscuro	2:04.557	2:06.557
18	84	(Netherlands) Zonta van den Goorbergh	RW-Idrofoglia Racing GP	Kalex	2:04.615	2:06.669
19	3	(Spain) Sergio García	QJMotor – Frinsa – MSi	Boscoscuro	2:04.664	2:08.715
20	14	(Italy) Tony Arbolino	Blu Cru Pramac Yamaha Moto2	Boscoscuro	2:04.803	2:07.092
21	4	(Spain) Iván Ortolá	QJMotor – Frinsa – MSi	Boscoscuro	2:05.493	2:06.428
22	71	(Japan) Ayumu Sasaki	RW-Idrofoglia Racing GP	Kalex	2:05.641	2:06.808
23	17	(Spain) Daniel Muñoz	Klint Forward Factory Team	Forward	2:06.123	2:09.445
24	92	(Japan) Yuki Kunii	Idemitsu Honda Team Asia	Kalex	2:06.534	2:10.077
OFFICIAL MOTO2 FREE PRACTICE TIMES REPORT

==== Practice ====
The top 14 riders (written in bold) qualified for Q2.

Pos.	No.	Biker	Team	Constructor	Time results
Pos.	No.	Biker	Team	Constructor	P1
1	18	(Spain) **Manuel González**	**Liqui Moly Dynavolt Intact GP**	**Kalex**	**2:02.111**
2	81	(Australia) **Senna Agius**	**Liqui Moly Dynavolt Intact GP**	**Kalex**	2:02.540
3	12	(Czech Republic) **Filip Salač**	**Elf Marc VDS Racing Team**	**Boscoscuro**	2:02.700
4	10	(Brazil) **Diogo Moreira**	**Italtrans Racing Team**	**Kalex**	2:02.741
5	7	(Belgium) **Barry Baltus**	**Fantic Racing Lino Sonego**	**Kalex**	2:02.913
6	27	(Spain) **Daniel Holgado**	**CFMoto Gaviota Aspar Team**	**Kalex**	2:02.992
7	71	(Japan) **Ayumu Sasaki**	**RW-Idrofoglia Racing GP**	**Kalex**	2:03.016
8	96	(United Kingdom) **Jake Dixon**	**Elf Marc VDS Racing Team**	**Boscoscuro**	2:03.019
9	16	(United States) **Joe Roberts**	**OnlyFans American Racing Team**	**Kalex**	2:03.053
10	9	(Spain) **Jorge Navarro**	**Klint Forward Factory Team**	**Forward**	2:03.130
11	4	(Spain) **Iván Ortolá**	**QJMotor – Frinsa – MSi**	**Boscoscuro**	2:03.224
12	53	(Turkey) **Deniz Öncü**	**Red Bull KTM Ajo**	**Kalex**	2:03.269
13	28	(Spain) **Izan Guevara**	**Blu Cru Pramac Yamaha Moto2**	**Boscoscuro**	2:03.331
14	75	(Spain) **Albert Arenas**	**Italjet Gresini Moto2**	**Kalex**	2:03.334
15	24	(Spain) Marcos Ramírez	OnlyFans American Racing Team	Kalex	2:03.409
16	44	(Spain) Arón Canet	Fantic Racing Lino Sonego	Kalex	2:03.469
17	84	(Netherlands) Zonta van den Goorbergh	RW-Idrofoglia Racing GP	Kalex	2:03.549
18	80	(Colombia) David Alonso	CFMoto Gaviota Aspar Team	Kalex	2:03.593
19	14	(Italy) Tony Arbolino	Blu Cru Pramac Yamaha Moto2	Boscoscuro	2:03.672
20	13	(Italy) Celestino Vietti	Beta Tools SpeedRS Team	Boscoscuro	2:03.699
21	21	(Spain) Alonso López	Beta Tools SpeedRS Team	Boscoscuro	2:03.702
22	3	(Spain) Sergio García	QJMotor – Frinsa – MSi	Boscoscuro	2:03.743
23	92	(Japan) Yuki Kunii	Idemitsu Honda Team Asia	Kalex	2:05.073
24	17	(Spain) Daniel Muñoz	Klint Forward Factory Team	Forward	2:05.243
OFFICIAL MOTO2 PRACTICE TIMES REPORT

=== Moto3 ===
==== Combined Practice 1-2 ====
Fastest session lap

Pos.	No.	Biker	Team	Constructor	Practice times	
Pos.	No.	Biker	Team	Constructor	P1	P2
1	99	(Spain) José Antonio Rueda	Red Bull KTM Ajo	KTM	**2:10.120**	**2:19.739**
2	22	(Spain) David Almansa	Leopard Racing	Honda	2:10.714	2:21.534
3	36	(Spain) Ángel Piqueras	Frinsa – MT Helmets – MSI	KTM	2:10.934	2:25.380
4	19	(United Kingdom) Scott Ogden	CIP Green Power	KTM	2:10.948	2:23.106
5	64	(Spain) David Muñoz	Liqui Moly Dynavolt Intact GP	KTM	2:11.056	2:22.102
6	66	(Australia) Joel Kelso	LEVELUP-MTA	KTM	2:11.356	2:21.429
7	83	(Spain) Álvaro Carpe	Red Bull KTM Ajo	KTM	2:11.418	2:21.745
8	58	(Italy) Luca Lunetta	Sic58 Squadra Corse	Honda	2:11.463	2:28.742
9	71	(Italy) Dennis Foggia	CFMoto Valresa Aspar Team	KTM	2:11.517	2:29.247
10	94	(Italy) Guido Pini	Liqui Moly Dynavolt Intact GP	KTM	2:11.563	2:23.755
11	28	(Spain) Máximo Quiles	CFMoto Valresa Aspar Team	KTM	2:11.588	2:22.994
12	32	(Spain) Vicente Pérez	LEVELUP-MTA	KTM	2:12.004	2:24.620
13	55	(Switzerland) Noah Dettwiler	CIP Green Power	KTM	2:12.024	2:23.992
14	10	(Italy) Nicola Carraro	Rivacold Snipers Team	Honda	2:12.332	2:25.105
15	78	(Spain) Joel Esteban	Leopard Racing	Honda	2:12.333	2:23.097
16	12	(Australia) Jacob Roulstone	Red Bull KTM Tech3	KTM	2:12.382	2:25.940
17	54	(Italy) Riccardo Rossi	Rivacold Snipers Team	Honda	2:12.459	2:23.069
18	8	(United Kingdom) Eddie O'Shea	GRYD - Mlav Racing	Honda	2:12.554	2:25.236
19	21	(South Africa) Ruché Moodley	Denssi Racing – BOE	KTM	2:12.601	2:29.110
20	14	(New Zealand) Cormac Buchanan	Denssi Racing – BOE	KTM	2:12.641	2:22.952
21	5	(Thailand) Tatchakorn Buasri	Honda Team Asia	Honda	2:12.660	2:25.584
22	72	(Japan) Taiyo Furusato	Honda Team Asia	Honda	2:12.683	2:25.850
23	82	(Italy) Stefano Nepa	Sic58 Squadra Corse	Honda	2:12.913	2:27.833
24	73	(Argentina) Valentín Perrone	Red Bull KTM Tech3	KTM	2:13.219	2:22.993
25	30	(United Kingdom) Max Cook	GRYD - Mlav Racing	KTM	2:20.614	2:24.774
26	6	(Japan) Ryusei Yamanaka	Frinsa – MT Helmets – MSI	KTM	N/A	2:26.840
OFFICIAL MOTO3 FREE PRACTICE TIMES REPORT

==== Practice ====
The top 14 riders (written in bold) qualified for Q2.

Pos.	No.	Biker	Team	Constructor	Practice times
Pos.	No.	Biker	Team	Constructor	P1
1	83	(Spain) **Álvaro Carpe**	**Red Bull KTM Ajo**	**KTM**	2:09.104
2	22	(Spain) **David Almansa**	**Leopard Racing**	**Honda**	2:09.344
3	19	(United Kingdom) **Scott Ogden**	**CIP Green Power**	**KTM**	2:09.505
4	66	(Australia) **Joel Kelso**	**LEVELUP-MTA**	**KTM**	2:09.630
5	58	(Italy) **Luca Lunetta**	**Sic58 Squadra Corse**	**Honda**	2:09.635
6	99	(Spain) **José Antonio Rueda**	**Red Bull KTM Ajo**	**KTM**	2:09.768
7	64	(Spain) **David Muñoz**	**Liqui Moly Dynavolt Intact GP**	**KTM**	2:09.772
8	12	(Australia) **Jacob Roulstone**	**Red Bull KTM Tech3**	**KTM**	2:09.796
9	6	(Japan) **Ryusei Yamanaka**	**Frinsa – MT Helmets – MSI**	**KTM**	2:09.926
10	10	(Italy) **Nicola Carraro**	**Rivacold Snipers Team**	**Honda**	2:09.982
11	36	(Spain) **Ángel Piqueras**	**Frinsa – MT Helmets – MSI**	**KTM**	2:10.058
12	94	(Italy) **Guido Pini**	**Liqui Moly Dynavolt Intact GP**	**KTM**	2:10.135
13	71	(Italy) **Dennis Foggia**	**CFMoto Valresa Aspar Team**	**KTM**	2:10.285
14	28	(Spain) **Máximo Quiles**	**CFMoto Valresa Aspar Team**	**KTM**	2:10.338
15	73	(Argentina) Valentín Perrone	Red Bull KTM Tech3	KTM	2:10.375
16	14	(New Zealand) Cormac Buchanan	Denssi Racing – BOE	KTM	2:10.392
17	21	(South Africa) Ruché Moodley	Denssi Racing – BOE	KTM	2:10.714
18	32	(Spain) Vicente Pérez	LEVELUP-MTA	KTM	2:10.744
19	54	(Italy) Riccardo Rossi	Rivacold Snipers Team	Honda	2:10.796
20	78	(Spain) Joel Esteban	Leopard Racing	Honda	2:10.923
21	72	(Japan) Taiyo Furusato	Honda Team Asia	Honda	2:10.973
22	8	(United Kingdom) Eddie O'Shea	GRYD - Mlav Racing	Honda	2:10.994
23	5	(Thailand) Tatchakorn Buasri	Honda Team Asia	Honda	2:11.332
24	82	(Italy) Stefano Nepa	Sic58 Squadra Corse	Honda	2:11.656
25	55	(Switzerland) Noah Dettwiler	CIP Green Power	KTM	2:11.773
26	30	(United Kingdom) Max Cook	GRYD - Mlav Racing	KTM	2:15.518
OFFICIAL MOTO3 PRACTICE TIMES REPORT

== Qualifying ==
=== MotoGP ===
Fastest session lap

Pos.	No.	Biker	Team	Constructor	Qualifying times		Final grid	Row
Pos.	No.	Biker	Team	Constructor	Q1	Q2	Final grid	Row
1	20	(France) Fabio Quartararo	Monster Energy Yamaha MotoGP Team	Yamaha	Qualified in Q2	1:57.233	1	1
2	73	(Spain) Álex Márquez	BK8 Gresini Racing MotoGP	Ducati	Qualified in Q2	1:57.542	2	1
3	63	(Italy) Francesco Bagnaia	Ducati Lenovo Team	Ducati	Qualified in Q2	1:57.822	3	1
4	93	(Spain) Marc Márquez	Ducati Lenovo Team	Ducati	Qualified in Q2	1:57.914	4	2
5	54	(Spain) Fermín Aldeguer	BK8 Gresini Racing MotoGP	Ducati	Qualified in Q2	1:58.073	5	2
6	43	(Australia) Jack Miller	Prima Pramac Yamaha MotoGP	Yamaha	Qualified in Q2	1:58.105	6	2
7	49	(Italy) Fabio Di Giannantonio	Pertamina Enduro VR46 Racing Team	Ducati	Qualified in Q2	1:58.126	7	3
8	10	(Italy) Luca Marini	Honda HRC Castrol	Honda	1:58.209	1:58.135	8	3
9	5	(France) Johann Zarco	Castrol Honda LCR	Honda	Qualified in Q2	1:58.140	9	3
10	21	(Italy) Franco Morbidelli	Pertamina Enduro VR46 Racing Team	Ducati	1:58.299	1:58.225	13 (Note: 3-place grid penalty due to impeding riders in practice)	5
11	72	(Italy) Marco Bezzecchi	Aprilia Racing	Aprilia	Qualified in Q2	1:58.343	10	4
12	42	(Spain) Álex Rins	Monster Energy Yamaha MotoGP Team	Yamaha	Qualified in Q2	1:58.457	11	4
13	36	(Spain) Joan Mir	Honda HRC Castrol	Honda	1:58.322	N/A	12	4
14	37	(Spain) Pedro Acosta	Red Bull KTM Factory Racing	KTM	1:58.536	N/A	14	5
15	88	(Portugal) Miguel Oliveira	Prima Pramac Yamaha MotoGP	Yamaha	1:58.539	N/A	15	5
16	25	(Spain) Raúl Fernández	Trackhouse MotoGP Team	Aprilia	1:58.734	N/A	16	6
17	23	(Italy) Enea Bastianini	Red Bull KTM Tech3	KTM	1:59.158	N/A	17	6
18	12	(Spain) Maverick Viñales	Red Bull KTM Tech3	KTM	1:59.159	N/A	18	6
19	33	(South Africa) Brad Binder	Red Bull KTM Factory Racing	KTM	1:59.288	N/A	19	7
20	32	(Italy) Lorenzo Savadori	Aprilia Racing	Aprilia	1:59.450	N/A	20	7
21	41	(Spain) Aleix Espargaró	Honda HRC Test Team	Honda	1:59.632	N/A	21	7
22	35	(Thailand) Somkiat Chantra	IDEMITSU Honda LCR	Honda	2:01.030	N/A	22	8
OFFICIAL MOTOGP QUALIFYING TIMES REPORT

=== Moto2 ===
Fastest session lap

Pos.	No.	Biker	Team	Constructor	Qualifying times		Final grid	Row
Pos.	No.	Biker	Team	Constructor	P1	P2	Final grid	Row
1	44	(Spain) Arón Canet	Fantic Racing Lino Sonego	Kalex	Qualified in Q2	2:02.482	1	1
2	18	(Spain) Manuel González	Liqui Moly Dynavolt Intact GP	Kalex	Qualified in Q2	2:02.630	2	1
3	10	(Brazil) Diogo Moreira	Italtrans Racing Team	Kalex	Qualified in Q2	2:02.817	3	1
4	80	(Colombia) David Alonso	CFMoto Gaviota Aspar Team	Kalex	2:03.228	2:02.992	4	2
5	81	(Australia) Senna Agius	Liqui Moly Dynavolt Intact GP	Kalex	Qualified in Q2	2:03.137	5	2
6	24	(Spain) Marcos Ramírez	OnlyFans American Racing Team	Kalex	2:03.536	2:03.232	6	2
7	7	(Belgium) Barry Baltus	Fantic Racing Lino Sonego	Kalex	1:34.894	2:03.258	7	3
8	28	(Spain) Izan Guevara	Blu Cru Pramac Yamaha Moto2	Boscoscuro	Qualified in Q2	2:03.488	8	3
9	27	(Spain) Daniel Holgado	CFMoto Gaviota Aspar Team	Kalex	Qualified in Q2	2:03.709	9	3
10	21	(Spain) Alonso López	Folladore SpeedRS Team	Boscoscuro	2:03.550	2:03.803	10	4
11	75	(Spain) Albert Arenas	Italjet Gresini Moto2	Kalex	Qualified in Q2	2:03.808	11	4
12	4	(Spain) Iván Ortolá	QJMotor – Frinsa – MSi	Boscoscuro	Qualified in Q2	2:03.836	12	4
13	96	(United Kingdom) Jake Dixon	Elf Marc VDS Racing Team	Boscoscuro	Qualified in Q2	2:03.838	13	5
14	16	(United States) Joe Roberts	OnlyFans American Racing Team	Kalex	Qualified in Q2	2:03.896	14	5
15	9	(Spain) Jorge Navarro	Klint Forward Factory Team	Forward	Qualified in Q2	2:04.267	15	5
16	12	(Czech Republic) Filip Salač	Elf Marc VDS Racing Team	Boscoscuro	Qualified in Q2	2:04.291	16	6
17	71	(Japan) Ayumu Sasaki	RW-Idrofoglia Racing GP	Kalex	Qualified in Q2	N/A	17	6
18	53	(Turkey) Deniz Öncü	Red Bull KTM Ajo	Kalex	Qualified in Q2	N/A	18	6
19	13	(Italy) Celestino Vietti	Folladore SpeedRS Team	Boscoscuro	2:03.638	N/A	19	7
20	84	(Netherlands) Zonta van den Goorbergh	RW-Idrofoglia Racing GP	Kalex	2:03.692	N/A	20	7
21	14	(Italy) Tony Arbolino	Blu Cru Pramac Yamaha Moto2	Boscoscuro	2:03.697	N/A	21	7
22	3	(Spain) Sergio García	QJMotor – Frinsa – MSi	Boscoscuro	2:04.312	N/A	22	8
23	92	(Japan) Yuki Kunii	Idemitsu Honda Team Asia	Kalex	2:05.244	N/A	23	8
24	17	(Spain) Daniel Muñoz	Klint Forward Factory Team	Forward	2:05.474	N/A	24	8
OFFICIAL MOTO2 QUALIFYING TIMES REPORT

=== Moto3 ===
Fastest session lap

Pos.	No.	Biker	Team	Constructor	Qualifying times		Final grid	Row
Pos.	No.	Biker	Team	Constructor	P1	P2	Final grid	Row
1	99	(Spain) José Antonio Rueda	Red Bull KTM Ajo	KTM	Qualified in Q2	2:09.449	26	9
2	83	(Spain) Álvaro Carpe	Red Bull KTM Ajo	KTM	Qualified in Q2	2:09.556	1	1
3	36	(Spain) Ángel Piqueras	Frinsa – MT Helmets – MSI	KTM	Qualified in Q2	2:09.845	2	1
4	22	(Spain) David Almansa	Leopard Racing	Honda	Qualified in Q2	2:09.966	3	1
5	66	(Australia) Joel Kelso	LEVELUP-MTA	KTM	Qualified in Q2	2:10.108	4	2
6	28	(Spain) Máximo Quiles	CFMoto Gaviota Aspar Team	KTM	Qualified in Q2	2:10.150	5	2
7	58	(Italy) Luca Lunetta	Sic58 Squadra Corse	Honda	Qualified in Q2	2:10.258	6	2
8	64	(Spain) David Muñoz	Liqui Moly Dynavolt Intact GP	KTM	Qualified in Q2	2:10.288	7	3
9	73	(Argentina) Valentín Perrone	Red Bull KTM Tech3	KTM	2:10.798	2:10.396	8	3
10	71	(Italy) Dennis Foggia	CFMoto Gaviota Aspar Team	KTM	Qualified in Q2	2:10.500	9	3
11	94	(Italy) Guido Pini	Liqui Moly Dynavolt Intact GP	KTM	Qualified in Q2	2:10.511	10	4
12	10	(Italy) Nicola Carraro	Rivacold Snipers Team	Honda	Qualified in Q2	2:10.647	11	4
13	12	(Australia) Jacob Roulstone	Red Bull KTM Tech3	KTM	Qualified in Q2	2:10.753	12	4
14	6	(Japan) Ryusei Yamanaka	Frinsa – MT Helmets – MSI	KTM	Qualified in Q2	2:10.805	13	5
15	32	(Spain) Vicente Pérez	LEVELUP-MTA	KTM	2:11.113	2:10.873	14	5
16	19	(United Kingdom) Scott Ogden	CIP Green Power	KTM	Qualified in Q2	2:10.953	15	5
17	54	(Italy) Riccardo Rossi	Rivacold Snipers Team	Honda	2:11.708	2:11.300	16	6
18	82	(Italy) Stefano Nepa	Sic58 Squadra Corse	Honda	2:11.587	2:11.333	17	6
19	14	(New Zealand) Cormac Buchanan	Denssi Racing – BOE	KTM	2:11.754	N/A	18	6
20	72	(Japan) Taiyo Furusato	Honda Team Asia	Honda	2:11.785	N/A	19	7
21	21	(South Africa) Ruché Moodley	Denssi Racing – BOE	KTM	2:11.804	N/A	20	7
22	5	(Thailand) Tatchakorn Buasri	Honda Team Asia	Honda	2:11.864	N/A	21	7
23	55	(Switzerland) Noah Dettwiler	CIP Green Power	KTM	2:12.097	N/A	22	8
24	78	(Spain) Joel Esteban	Leopard Racing	Honda	2:12.142	N/A	23	8
25	8	(United Kingdom) Eddie O'Shea	GRYD - Mlav Racing	Honda	2:12.607	N/A	24	8
26	30	(United Kingdom) Max Cook	GRYD - Mlav Racing	KTM	2:15.120	N/A	25	9
OFFICIAL MOTO3 QUALIFYING TIMES REPORT

== MotoGP Sprint ==
The MotoGP Sprint was held on 24 May 2025.

Pos.	No.	Rider	Team	Manufacturer	Laps	Time/Retired	Grid	Points
1	73	(Spain) Álex Márquez	BK8 Gresini Racing MotoGP	Ducati	10	19:53.657	2	12
2	93	(Spain) Marc Márquez	Ducati Lenovo Team	Ducati	10	+3.511	4	9
3	49	(Italy) Fabio Di Giannantonio	Pertamina Enduro VR46 Racing Team	Ducati	10	+5.072	7	7
4	72	(Italy) Marco Bezzecchi	Aprilia Racing	Aprilia	10	+5.658	11	6
5	5	(France) Johann Zarco	Castrol Honda LCR	Honda	10	+6.707	9	5
6	63	(Italy) Francesco Bagnaia	Ducati Lenovo Team	Ducati	10	+7.057	3	4
7	20	(France) Fabio Quartararo	Monster Energy Yamaha MotoGP Team	Yamaha	10	+7.231	1	3
8	37	(Spain) Pedro Acosta	Red Bull KTM Factory Racing	KTM	10	+9.186	14	2
9	43	(Australia) Jack Miller	Prima Pramac Yamaha MotoGP	Yamaha	10	+9.923	6	1
10	10	(Italy) Luca Marini	Honda HRC Castrol	Honda	10	+10.206	8	
11	21	(Italy) Franco Morbidelli	Pertamina Enduro VR46 Racing Team	Ducati	10	+10.898	10	
12	36	(Spain) Joan Mir	Honda HRC Castrol	Honda	10	+11.405	13	
13	12	(Spain) Maverick Viñales	Red Bull KTM Tech3	KTM	10	+11.933	18	
14	54	(Spain) Fermín Aldeguer	BK8 Gresini Racing MotoGP	Ducati	10	+15.376	5	
15	23	(Italy) Enea Bastianini	Red Bull KTM Tech3	KTM	10	+18.135	17	
16	88	(Portugal) Miguel Oliveira	Prima Pramac Yamaha MotoGP	Yamaha	10	+19.213	15	
17	41	(Spain) Aleix Espargaró	Honda HRC Test Team	Honda	10	+20.468	21	
18	32	(Spain) Lorenzo Savadori	Aprilia Racing	Aprilia	10	+20.968	20	
19	25	(Spain) Raúl Fernández	Trackhouse MotoGP Team	Aprilia	10	+24.729	16	
20	42	(Spain) Álex Rins	Monster Energy Yamaha MotoGP Team	Yamaha	10	+26.919	12	
21	35	(Thailand) Somkiat Chantra	IDEMITSU Honda LCR	Honda	10	+32.532	22	
Ret	33	(South Africa) Brad Binder	Red Bull KTM Factory Racing	KTM	1	Crashed out	19	
Fastest sprint lap: (Spain) Álex Márquez (Ducati) – 1:58.714 (lap 3)
OFFICIAL MOTOGP SPRINT REPORT

== Warm Up ==
=== Warm Up MotoGP ===
Pos.	No.	Biker	Team	Constructor	
Pos.	No.	Biker	Team	Constructor	Time results
1	25	(Spain) Raúl Fernández	Trackhouse MotoGP Team	Aprilia	2:12.973
2	5	(France) Johann Zarco	CASTROL Honda LCR	Honda	2:13.085
3	54	(Spain) Fermín Aldeguer	BK8 Gresini Racing MotoGP	Ducati	2:13.274
4	72	(Italy) Marco Bezzecchi	Aprilia Racing	Aprilia	2:13.347
5	10	(Italy) Luca Marini	Honda HRC Castrol	Honda	2:13.620
6	93	(Spain) Marc Márquez	Ducati Lenovo Team	Ducati	2:13.694
7	12	(Spain) Maverick Viñales	Red Bull KTM Tech3	KTM	2:14.030
8	36	(Spain) Joan Mir	Honda HRC Castrol	Honda	2:14.148
9	21	(Italy) Franco Morbidelli	Pertamina Enduro VR46 Racing Team	Ducati	2:14.334
10	43	(Australia) Jack Miller	Prima Pramac Yamaha MotoGP	Yamaha	2:14.359
11	37	(Spain) Pedro Acosta	Red Bull KTM Factory Racing	KTM	2:14.402
12	73	(Spain) Álex Márquez	BK8 Gresini Racing MotoGP	Ducati	2:14.513
13	20	(France) Fabio Quartararo	Monster Energy Yamaha MotoGP Team	Yamaha	2:15.479
14	63	(Italy) Francesco Bagnaia	Ducati Lenovo Team	Ducati	2:15.567
15	33	(South Africa) Brad Binder	Red Bull KTM Factory Racing	KTM	2:16.022
16	88	(Portugal) Miguel Oliveira	Prima Pramac Yamaha MotoGP	Yamaha	2:16.106
17	35	(Thailand) Somkiat Chantra	Idemitsu Honda LCR	Honda	2:16.490
18	42	(Spain) Álex Rins	Monster Energy Yamaha MotoGP Team	Yamaha	2:17.002
19	32	(Italy) Lorenzo Savadori	Aprilia Racing	Aprilia	2:17.069
20	49	(Italy) Fabio Di Giannantonio	Pertamina Enduro VR46 Racing Team	Ducati	2:17.305
21	23	(Italy) Enea Bastianini	Red Bull KTM Tech3	KTM	2:17.722
22	41	(Spain) Aleix Espargaró	Honda HRC Test Team	Honda	2:18.860
OFFICIAL MOTOGP WARM UP TIMES REPORT

== Race ==
=== MotoGP ===
The race, scheduled to be run for 20 laps, was red-flagged after the first lap due to an oil spill on the track. The race was later restarted over 19 laps

Pos.	No.	Rider	Team	Manufacturer	Laps	Time/Retired	Grid	Points
1	72	(Italy) Marco Bezzecchi	Aprilia Racing	Aprilia	19	38:16.037	10	25
2	5	(France) Johann Zarco	Castrol Honda LCR	Honda	19	+4.088	9	20
3	93	(Spain) Marc Márquez	Ducati Lenovo Team	Ducati	19	+5.929	4	16
4	21	(Italy) Franco Morbidelli	Pertamina Enduro VR46 Racing Team	Ducati	19	+5.946	13	13
5	73	(Spain) Álex Márquez	BK8 Gresini Racing MotoGP	Ducati	19	+6.024	2	11
6	37	(Spain) Pedro Acosta	Red Bull KTM Factory Racing	KTM	19	+7.109	14	10
7	43	(Australia) Jack Miller	Prima Pramac Yamaha MotoGP	Yamaha	19	+7.398	6	9
8	54	(Spain) Fermín Aldeguer	BK8 Gresini Racing MotoGP	Ducati	19	+8.584	5	8
9	49	(Italy) Fabio Di Giannantonio	Pertamina Enduro VR46 Racing Team	Ducati	19	+9.764	7	7
10	36	(Spain) Joan Mir	Honda HRC Castrol	Honda	19	+10.320	12	6
11	12	(Spain) Maverick Viñales	Red Bull KTM Tech3	KTM	19	+11.318	18	5
12	25	(Spain) Raúl Fernández	Trackhouse MotoGP Team	Aprilia	19	+16.175	16	4
13	42	(Spain) Álex Rins	Monster Energy Yamaha MotoGP Team	Yamaha	19	+16.312	11	3
14 (Note: 1-position penalty due to exceeding track limits on the last lap)	33	(South Africa) Brad Binder	Red Bull KTM Factory Racing	KTM	19	+16.262	19	2
15	10	(Italy) Luca Marini	Honda HRC Castrol	Honda	19	+23.729 (Note: 16-second penalty for tyre pressure regulations infringement)	8	1
16	88	(Portugal) Miguel Oliveira	Prima Pramac Yamaha MotoGP	Yamaha	19	+31.641	15	
17	23	(Italy) Enea Bastianini	Red Bull KTM Tech3	KTM	19	+54.225	17	
18	32	(Italy) Lorenzo Savadori	Aprilia Racing	Aprilia	19	+56.488	20	
19	35	(Thailand) Somkiat Chantra	IDEMITSU Honda LCR	Honda	19	+1:04.884	22	
Ret	20	(France) Fabio Quartararo	Monster Energy Yamaha MotoGP Team	Yamaha	12	Ride height device	1	
Ret	63	(Italy) Francesco Bagnaia	Ducati Lenovo Team	Ducati	3	Accident	3	
Ret	41	(Spain) Aleix Espargaró	Honda HRC Test Team	Honda	3	Retired	21	
Fastest lap: (Italy) Marco Bezzecchi (Aprilia) – 1:59.770 (lap 9)
OFFICIAL MOTOGP RACE REPORT

=== Moto2 ===
Pos.	No.	Rider	Team	Manufacturer	Laps	Time/Retired	Grid	Points
1	81	(Australia) Senna Agius	Liqui Moly Dynavolt Intact GP	Kalex	22	35:26.390	5	25
2	10	(Brazil) Diogo Moreira	Italtrans Racing Team	Kalex	17	+0.434	3	20
3	80	(Colombia) David Alonso	CFMoto Gaviota Aspar Team	Kalex	17	+0.498	4	16
4	44	(Spain) Arón Canet	Fantic Racing Lino Sonego	Kalex	17	+0.518	1	13
5	28	(Spain) Izan Guevara	Blu Cru Pramac Yamaha Moto2	Boscoscuro	17	+0.673	8	11
6	13	(Italy) Celestino Vietti	Folladore SpeedRS Team	Boscoscuro	17	+2.820	19	10
7	12	(Czech Republic) Filip Salač	Elf Marc VDS Racing Team	Boscoscuro	17	+3.437	16	9
8	16	(United States) Joe Roberts	OnlyFans American Racing Team	Kalex	17	+4.448	14	8
9	24	(Spain) Marcos Ramírez	OnlyFans American Racing Team	Kalex	17	+4.683	6	7
10	21	(Spain) Alonso López	Folladore SpeedRS Team	Boscoscuro	17	+5.070	10	6
11	96	(United Kingdom) Jake Dixon	Elf Marc VDS Racing Team	Boscoscuro	17	+7.565 (Note: 3 seconds penalty - failed to comply with long lap penalty)	13	5
12	75	(Spain) Albert Arenas	Italjet Gresini Moto2	Kalex	17	+12.302	11	4
13	84	(Netherlands) Zonta van den Goorbergh	RW-Idrofoglia Racing GP	Kalex	17	+16.315	20	3
14	14	(Italy) Tony Arbolino	Blu Cru Pramac Yamaha Moto2	Boscoscuro	17	+18.242	21	2
15	9	(Spain) Jorge Navarro	Klint Forward Factory Team	Forward	17	+18.359	15	1
16	3	(Spain) Sergio García	QJMotor – Frinsa – MSi	Boscoscuro	17	+19.268	22	
17	71	(Japan) Ayumu Sasaki	RW-Idrofoglia Racing GP	Kalex	17	+19.489	17	
18	27	(Spain) Daniel Holgado	CFMoto Gaviota Aspar Team	Kalex	17	+19.552	9	
19	53	(Turkey) Deniz Öncü	Red Bull KTM Ajo	Kalex	17	+20.093	18	
20	92	(Japan) Yuki Kunii	Idemitsu Honda Team Asia	Kalex	17	+25.723	23	
21	17	(Spain) Daniel Muñoz	Klint Forward Factory Team	Forward	17	+40.560	24	
Ret	18	(Spain) Manuel González	Liqui Moly Dynavolt Intact GP	Kalex	3	Accident	2	
Ret	7	(Belgium) Barry Baltus	Fantic Racing Lino Sonego	Kalex	3	Accident	7	
Ret	4	(Spain) Iván Ortolá	QJMotor – Frinsa – MSi	Boscoscuro	3	Accident	12	
Fastest lap: (Spain) Manuel González (Kalex) - 2:04.034 (lap 3)
OFFICIAL MOTO2 RACE REPORT

=== Moto3 ===
Pos.	No.	Rider	Team	Manufacturer	Laps	Time/Retired	Grid	Points
1	99	(Spain) José Antonio Rueda	Red Bull KTM Ajo	KTM	15	32:58.943	26 (Note: Back of the grid start penalty)	25
2	28	(Spain) Máximo Quiles	CFMoto Gaviota Aspar Team	KTM	15	+0.046	5	20
3	58	(Italy) Luca Lunetta	Sic58 Squadra Corse	Honda	15	+0.908	6	16
4	83	(Spain) Álvaro Carpe	Red Bull KTM Ajo	KTM	15	+1.071	1	13
5	73	(Argentina) Valentín Perrone	Red Bull KTM Tech3	KTM	15	+1.176	8	11
6	22	(Spain) David Almansa	Leopard Racing	Honda	15	+1.349	3	10
7	94	(Italy) Guido Pini	Liqui Moly Dynavolt Intact GP	KTM	15	+1.492	10	9
8	6	(Japan) Ryusei Yamanaka	Frinsa – MT Helmets – MSI	KTM	15	+1.778	13	8
9	32	(Spain) Vicente Pérez	LEVELUP-MTA	KTM	15	+2.618	14	7
10	10	(Italy) Nicola Carraro	Rivacold Snipers Team	Honda	15	+2.779	11	6
11	19	(United Kingdom) Scott Ogden	CIP Green Power	KTM	15	+2.953	15	5
12	72	(Japan) Taiyo Furusato	Honda Team Asia	Honda	15	+6.343 (Note: 3 seconds penalty - insufficient time to complete long lap penalty)	19	4
13	12	(Australia) Jacob Roulstone	Red Bull KTM Tech3	KTM	15	+6.626	12	3
14	14	(New Zealand) Cormac Buchanan	Denssi Racing – BOE	KTM	15	+22.242	18	2
15	54	(Italy) Riccardo Rossi	Rivacold Snipers Team	Honda	15	+22.323	16	1
16	82	(Italy) Stefano Nepa	Sic58 Squadra Corse	Honda	15	+22.419	17	
17	8	(United Kingdom) Eddie O'Shea	GRYD - Mlav Racing	Honda	15	+38.931	24	
18	55	(Switzerland) Noah Dettwiler	CIP Green Power	KTM	15	+39.022	22	
19	5	(Thailand) Tatchakorn Buasri	Honda Team Asia	Honda	15	+39.144	21	
20	21	(South Africa) Ruché Moodley	Denssi Racing – BOE	KTM	15	+45.349	20	
21	30	(United Kingdom) Max Cook	GRYD - Mlav Racing	KTM	15	+1:20.183	25	
NC	31	(Spain) Joel Esteban	Leopard Racing	Honda	14	+2:06.484	23	
Ret	36	(Spain) Ángel Piqueras	Frinsa – MT Helmets – MSI	KTM	14	Accident	2	
Ret	64	(Spain) David Muñoz	Liqui Moly Dynavolt Intact GP	KTM	4	Accident	7	
Ret	66	(Australia) Joel Kelso	LEVELUP-MTA	KTM	3	Accident	4	
Ret	71	(Italy) Dennis Foggia	CFMoto Gaviota Aspar Team	KTM	0	Accident	9	
Fastest lap: (Japan) Taiyo Furusato (KTM) - 2:10.794 (lap 14)
OFFICIAL MOTO3 RACE REPORT

== Championship standings after the race ==
Below are the standings for the top five riders, constructors, and teams after the round.

=== MotoGP ===
Riders' Championship standings

	Pos.	Rider	Points
	1	(Spain) Marc Márquez	196
	2	(Spain) Álex Márquez	172
	3	(Italy) Francesco Bagnaia	124
	4	(Italy) Franco Morbidelli	98
1	5	(France) Johann Zarco	97

Constructors' Championship standings

	Pos.	Constructor	Points
	1	(Italy) Ducati	245
	2	(Japan) Honda	110
2	3	(Italy) Aprilia	93
1	4	(Austria) KTM	88
1	5	(Japan) Yamaha	84

Teams' Championship standings

	Pos.	Team	Points
	1	(Italy) Ducati Lenovo Team	320
	2	(Italy) BK8 Gresini Racing MotoGP	228
	3	(Italy) Pertamina Enduro VR46 Racing Team	186
2	4	(Monaco) LCR Honda	97
	5	(Austria) Red Bull KTM Factory Racing	92

=== Moto2 ===
Riders' Championship standings

Pos.	Rider	Points
1	(Spain) Manuel González	111
2	(Spain) Arón Canet	108
3	(United Kingdom) Jake Dixon	82
4	(Belgium) Barry Baltus	73
5	(Brazil) Diogo Moreira	70

Constructors' Championship standings

Pos.	Constructor	Points
1	(Germany) Kalex	158
2	(Italy) Boscoscuro	99
3	(Switzerland) Forward	11

Teams' Championship standings

Pos.	Team	Points
1	(Italy) Fantic Racing Lino Sonego	181
2	(Germany) Liqui Moly Dynavolt Intact GP	175
3	(Belgium) Elf Marc VDS Racing Team	119
4	(Italy) Beta Tools SpeedRS Team	94
5	(Italy) Italtrans Racing Team	75

=== Moto3 ===
Riders' Championship standings

	Pos.	Rider	Points
	1	(Spain) José Antonio Rueda	141
	2	(Spain) Ángel Piqueras	87
	3	(Australia) Joel Kelso	77
2	4	(Spain) Álvaro Carpe	69
	5	(Japan) Taiyo Furusato	62

Constructors' Championship standings

Pos.	Constructor	Points
1	(Austria) KTM	175
2	(Japan) Honda	103

Teams' Championship standings

Pos.	Team	Points
1	(Finland) Red Bull KTM Ajo	210
2	(Spain) Frinsa – MT Helmets – MSi	129
3	(Italy) LevelUp – MTA	124
4	(Luxembourg) Leopard Racing	104
5	(Italy) Sic58 Squadra Corse	81

== Notes ==
Previous race: 2025 French Grand Prix	FIM Grand Prix World Championship; 2025 season	Next race: 2025 Aragon Grand Prix
Previous race: 2024 British Grand Prix	British motorcycle Grand Prix	Next race: 2026 British Grand Prix
