= 2019 Red Bull MotoGP Rookies Cup =

Motorcycle racing competition

2019 Red Bull MotoGP Rookies Cup
Previous:	2018	Next:	2020

The 2019 Red Bull MotoGP Rookies Cup was the thirteenth season of the Red Bull MotoGP Rookies Cup. The season, for the seventh year contested by the riders on equal KTM 250cc 4-stroke Moto3 bikes, was held over 12 races in seven meetings on the Grand Prix motorcycle racing calendar, beginning at Jerez on 4 May and ending on 22 September at MotorLand Aragón. Spanish rider Carlos Tatay won the championship, securing the title after the Misano race.

== Calendar ==
2019 calendar
Round	Date	Circuit	Pole position	Fastest lap	Race winner	Sources
1	4 May	(Spain) Jerez	(Japan) Yuki Kunii	(Belgium) Barry Baltus	(Japan) Yuki Kunii	
1	5 May	(Spain) Jerez	(Japan) Yuki Kunii	(Spain) Carlos Tatay	(Spain) Carlos Tatay	
2	1 June	(Italy) Mugello	(Japan) Yuki Kunii	(Spain) Carlos Tatay	(Spain) Carlos Tatay	
3	29 June	(Netherlands) Assen	(Spain) Carlos Tatay	(Belgium) Barry Baltus	(Spain) Carlos Tatay	
3	30 June	(Netherlands) Assen	(Spain) Carlos Tatay	(United Kingdom) Max Cook	(Spain) Carlos Tatay	
4	6 July	(Germany) Sachsenring	(Japan) Yuki Kunii	(United Kingdom) Max Cook	(Spain) Pedro Acosta	
4	7 July	(Germany) Sachsenring	(Japan) Yuki Kunii	(Spain) Pedro Acosta	(Japan) Yuki Kunii	
5	10 August	(Austria) Spielberg	(Spain) Álex Escrig	(Spain) Carlos Tatay	(Spain) Pedro Acosta	
5	11 August	(Austria) Spielberg	(Spain) Álex Escrig	(France) Gabin Planques	(Japan) Haruki Noguchi	
6	14 September	(San Marino) Misano	(Japan) Haruki Noguchi	(Spain) Marcos Uriarte	(Spain) Pedro Acosta	
7	21 September	Aragon	(Spain) Marcos Uriarte	(United Kingdom) Max Cook	(Australia) Billy Van Eerde	
7	22 September	Aragon	(Spain) Marcos Uriarte	(Russia) Artem Maraev	(Spain) David Salvador	

== Entry list ==
2019 entry list
No.	Rider	Rounds
5	(France) Lorenzo Fellon	All
6	(Germany) Phillip Tonn	All
7	(Belgium) Barry Baltus	All
11	(Spain) Álex Escrig	All
28	(Italy) Matteo Bertelle	All
29	(Australia) Billy Van Eerde	All
30	(United Kingdom) Max Cook	All
34	(Indonesia) Mario Aji	1–2, 5–7
37	(Spain) Pedro Acosta	All
38	(Spain) David Salvador	All
44	(Colombia) Nicolás Hernández	1–6
45	(France) Clément Rougé	All
48	(France) Gabin Planques	All
50	(Switzerland) Jason Dupasquier	All
55	(Switzerland) Noah Dettwiler	All
56	(Japan) Haruki Noguchi	All
62	(South Africa) Aidan Liebenberg	All
66	(Spain) Adrián Huertas	1–2, 5
70	(United States) Tyler Scott	1–4, 6–7
74	(Japan) Daijiro Sako	2–7
84	(Netherlands) Zonta van den Goorbergh	All
88	(Russia) Artem Maraev	All
89	(Spain) Marcos Uriarte	All
92	(Japan) Yuki Kunii	1–4
99	(Spain) Carlos Tatay	1–6

== Championship standings ==
Points were awarded to the top fifteen riders, provided the rider finished the race.

Position	**1st**	**2nd**	**3rd**	**4th**	**5th**	**6th**	**7th**	**8th**	**9th**	**10th**	**11th**	**12th**	**13th**	**14th**	**15th**
Points	25	20	16	13	11	10	9	8	7	6	5	4	3	2	1

Pos.	Rider	JER (Spain)		MUG (Italy)	ASS (Netherlands)		SAC (Germany)		RBR (Austria)		MIS (San Marino)	ARA (Aragon)		Pts
1	(Spain) Carlos Tatay	2	1	1	**1**	**1**	3	2	14	2	3			194
2	(Spain) Pedro Acosta	DNS	DNS	2	2	15	1	4	1	5	1	4	7	162
3	(Japan) Haruki Noguchi	6	5	3	3	Ret	4	Ret	3	1	**4**	2	5	151
4	(Spain) David Salvador	4	6	4	5	2	Ret	8	Ret	16	2	Ret	1	120
5	(France) Lorenzo Fellon	5	11	5	6	7	5	7	5	10	6	6	4	116
6	(Australia) Billy Van Eerde	Ret	Ret	Ret	Ret	9	6	6	2	3	14	1	2	110
7	(Japan) Yuki Kunii	**1**	**2**	**Ret**	7	6	**2**	**1**						109
8	(Switzerland) Jason Dupasquier	7	4	6	8	5	8	5	7	8	7	Ret	10	102
9	(United Kingdom) Max Cook	11	8	13	Ret	4	9	3	10	9	11	7	12	83
10	(Spain) Marcos Uriarte	8	7	Ret	4	8	7	10	15	20	5	**Ret**	**3**	81
11	(Spain) Álex Escrig	12	9	12	Ret	13	10	9	**19**	**DNS**	9	3	9	61
12	(Belgium) Barry Baltus	3	Ret	8	Ret	3	DNS	DNS	8	12	Ret	Ret	8	60
13	(Netherlands) Zonta van den Goorbergh	13	14	15	9	10	14	13	6	6	12	13	13	54
14	(Italy) Matteo Bertelle	16	3	Ret	Ret	DNS	11	12	9	11	8	Ret	11	50
15	(France) Gabin Planques	17	17	16	13	17	12	11	4	7	Ret	8	14	44
16	(Indonesia) Mario Aji	10	10	14					Ret	15	10	5	6	42
17	(Russia) Artem Maraev	14	16	11	10	12	17	15	12	17	13	Ret	15	26
18	(France) Clément Rougé	9	13	7	16	16	13	Ret	Ret	13	16	Ret	21	25
19	(Japan) Daijiro Sako			17	14	14	16	14	11	14	15	9	17	21
20	(Spain) Adrián Huertas	DNS	DNS	9					16	4				20
21	(Colombia) Nicolás Hernández	Ret	12	10	Ret	11	Ret	DNS	17	21	Ret			15
22	(Germany) Phillip Tonn	19	18	Ret	12	20	15	Ret	13	19	17	10	16	14
23	(United States) Tyler Scott	20	19	18	11	19	19	17			18	12	19	9
24	(Switzerland) Noah Dettwiler	15	Ret	19	Ret	18	18	16	18	18	19	11	18	6
25	(South Africa) Aidan Liebenberg	18	15	Ret	15	21	DNS	Ret	20	22	20	14	20	4
Pos.	Rider	JER (Spain)		MUG (Italy)	ASS (Netherlands)		SAC (Germany)		RBR (Austria)		MIS (San Marino)	ARA (Aragon)		Pts

Colour	Result
Gold	Winner
Silver	Second place
Bronze	Third place
Green	Points classification
Blue	Non-points classification
Blue	Non-classified finish (NC)
Purple	Retired, not classified (Ret)
Red	Did not qualify (DNQ)
Red	Did not pre-qualify (DNPQ)
Black	Disqualified (DSQ)
White	Did not start (DNS)
White	Withdrew (WD)
White	Race cancelled (C)
Blank	Did not practice (DNP)
Blank	Did not arrive (DNA)
Blank	Excluded (EX)

**Bold** – Pole position
Italics – Fastest lap
