= 2024 Thailand motorcycle Grand Prix =

Motorcycle races in Buriram

2024 Thailand Grand Prix
Race details
- Race 18 of 20 races in the 2024 Grand Prix motorcycle racing season
- Date: 27 October 2024
- Official name: PT Thailand Grand Prix
- Location: Chang International Circuit; Buriram, Thailand
- Course: Permanent racing facility; 4.554 km (2.830 mi)

MotoGP
Pole position
Rider	(Italy) Francesco Bagnaia	Ducati
Time	1:28.700	
Fastest lap
Rider	(Italy) Fabio Di Giannantonio	Ducati
Time	1:39.576 on lap 17	
Podium
First	(Italy) Francesco Bagnaia	Ducati
Second	(Spain) Jorge Martín	Ducati
Third	(Spain) Pedro Acosta	KTM

Moto2
Pole position
Rider	(Japan) Ai Ogura	Boscoscuro
Time	1:34.728	
Fastest lap
Rider	(Japan) Ai Ogura	Boscoscuro
Time	1:35.597 on lap 12	
Podium
First	(Spain) Arón Canet	Kalex
Second	(Japan) Ai Ogura	Boscoscuro
Third	(Spain) Marcos Ramírez	Kalex

Moto3
Pole position
Rider	(Australia) Joel Kelso	KTM
Time	1:40.603	
Fastest lap
Rider	(Italy) Luca Lunetta	Honda
Time	1:41.231 on lap 10	
Podium
First	(Colombia) David Alonso	CFMoto
Second	(Italy) Luca Lunetta	Honda
Third	(Netherlands) Collin Veijer	Husqvarna

The 2024 Thailand motorcycle Grand Prix (officially known as the PT Thailand Grand Prix) was the eighteenth round of the 2024 Grand Prix motorcycle racing season. It was held at the Chang International Circuit in Buriram on 27 October 2024.

In the MotoGP class, Ducati Lenovo Team secured their fourth Teams' Championship.

In the Moto2 class, Ai Ogura secured the Riders' Championship after finishing in the podium, becoming the first Japanese rider since Hiroshi Aoyama in 2009 to win a World Riders' title. Ogura's team MT Helmets – MSi also won the Teams' title in their first season in the intermediate class.

In the Moto3 class, CFMoto Aspar Racing Team clinched their second Teams' Championship, with their constructor CFMoto also securing their first Constructor's title.

== MotoGP Sprint ==
The MotoGP Sprint was held on 26 October.

Pos.	No.	Rider	Team	Constructor	Laps	Time/Retired	Grid	Points
1	23	(Italy) Enea Bastianini	Ducati Lenovo Team	Ducati	13	19:31.131	2	12
2	89	(Spain) Jorge Martín	Prima Pramac Racing	Ducati	13	+1.357	3	9
3	1	(Italy) Francesco Bagnaia	Ducati Lenovo Team	Ducati	13	+2.372	1	7
4	93	(Spain) Marc Márquez	Gresini Racing MotoGP	Ducati	13	+5.402	5	6
5	73	(Spain) Álex Márquez	Gresini Racing MotoGP	Ducati	13	+10.140	9	5
6	21	(Italy) Franco Morbidelli	Prima Pramac Racing	Ducati	13	+11.087	11	4
7	72	(Italy) Marco Bezzecchi	Pertamina Enduro VR46 Racing Team	Ducati	13	+11.538	4	3
8	49	(Italy) Fabio Di Giannantonio	Pertamina Enduro VR46 Racing Team	Ducati	13	+11.680	8	2
9	33	(South Africa) Brad Binder	Red Bull KTM Factory Racing	KTM	13	+13.692	13	1
10	20	(France) Fabio Quartararo	Monster Energy Yamaha MotoGP Team	Yamaha	13	+14.483	6	
11	43	(Australia) Jack Miller	Red Bull KTM Factory Racing	KTM	13	+18.397	15	
12	5	(France) Johann Zarco	Castrol Honda LCR	Honda	13	+18.544	12	
13	36	(Spain) Joan Mir	Repsol Honda Team	Honda	13	+19.265	19	
14	25	(Spain) Raúl Fernández	Trackhouse Racing	Aprilia	13	+19.688	20	
15	41	(Spain) Aleix Espargaró	Aprilia Racing	Aprilia	13	+19.988	14	
16	37	(Spain) Augusto Fernández	Red Bull GasGas Tech3	KTM	13	+21.298	16	
17	42	(Spain) Álex Rins	Monster Energy Yamaha MotoGP Team	Yamaha	13	+21.413	17	
18	30	(Japan) Takaaki Nakagami	Idemitsu Honda LCR	Honda	13	+23.400	18	
19	10	(Italy) Luca Marini	Repsol Honda Team	Honda	13	+23.979	21	
20	12	(Spain) Maverick Viñales	Aprilia Racing	Aprilia	13	+29.474	10	
21	32	(Italy) Lorenzo Savadori	Trackhouse Racing	Aprilia	13	+39.389	22	
Ret	31	(Spain) Pedro Acosta	Red Bull GasGas Tech3	KTM	10	Retired	7	
Fastest lap: (Spain) Jorge Martín (Ducati) – 1:29.554 (lap 5)
OFFICIAL MOTOGP SPRINT REPORT

== Race ==
=== MotoGP ===
Pos.	No.	Rider	Team	Constructor	Laps	Time/Retired	Grid	Points
1	1	(Italy) Francesco Bagnaia	Ducati Lenovo Team	Ducati	26	43:38.108	1	25
2	89	(Spain) Jorge Martín	Prima Pramac Racing	Ducati	26	+2.905	3	20
3	31	(Spain) Pedro Acosta	Red Bull GasGas Tech3	KTM	26	+3.800	7	16
4	49	(Italy) Fabio Di Giannantonio	Pertamina Enduro VR46 Racing Team	Ducati	26	+4.636	8	13
5	43	(Australia) Jack Miller	Red Bull KTM Factory Racing	KTM	26	+5.532	15	11
6	33	(South Africa) Brad Binder	Red Bull KTM Factory Racing	KTM	26	+5.898	13	10
7	12	(Spain) Maverick Viñales	Aprilia Racing	Aprilia	26	+8.498	10	9
8	5	(France) Johann Zarco	Castrol Honda LCR	Honda	26	+17.672	12	8
9	41	(Spain) Aleix Espargaró	Aprilia Racing	Aprilia	26	+18.588	14	7
10	73	(Spain) Álex Márquez	Gresini Racing MotoGP	Ducati	26	+21.163	23	6
11	93	(Spain) Marc Márquez	Gresini Racing MotoGP	Ducati	26	+22.251	5	5
12	10	(Italy) Luca Marini	Repsol Honda Team	Honda	26	+22.859	21	4
13	30	(Japan) Takaaki Nakagami	Idemitsu Honda LCR	Honda	26	+24.531	18	3
14	23	(Italy) Enea Bastianini	Ducati Lenovo Team	Ducati	26	+27.090	2	2
15	36	(Spain) Joan Mir	Repsol Honda Team	Honda	26	+30.870	17	1
16	20	(France) Fabio Quartararo	Monster Energy Yamaha MotoGP Team	Yamaha	26	+50.021	6	
Ret	37	(Spain) Augusto Fernández	Red Bull GasGas Tech3	KTM	23	Accident	16	
Ret	42	(Spain) Álex Rins	Monster Energy Yamaha MotoGP Team	Yamaha	22	Accident	17	
Ret	32	(Italy) Lorenzo Savadori	Trackhouse Racing	Aprilia	16	Retired	22	
Ret	21	(Italy) Franco Morbidelli	Prima Pramac Racing	Ducati	7	Accident	11	
Ret	25	(Spain) Raúl Fernández	Trackhouse Racing	Aprilia	6	Accident	20	
Ret	72	(Italy) Marco Bezzecchi	Pertamina Enduro VR46 Racing Team	Ducati	3	Accident	4	
Fastest lap: (Italy) Fabio Di Giannantonio (Ducati) – 1:39.576 (lap 17)
OFFICIAL MOTOGP RACE REPORT

== Championship standings after the race ==
Below are the standings for the top five riders, constructors, and teams after the round.

=== MotoGP ===
Riders' Championship standings

Pos.	Rider	Points
1	(Spain) Jorge Martín	453
2	(Italy) Francesco Bagnaia	436
3	(Spain) Marc Márquez	356
4	(Italy) Enea Bastianini	345
5	(South Africa) Brad Binder	203

Constructors' Championship standings

Pos.	Constructor	Points
1	(Italy) Ducati	648
2	(Austria) KTM	302
3	(Italy) Aprilia	276
4	(Japan) Yamaha	104
5	(Japan) Honda	68

Teams' Championship standings

Pos.	Team	Points
1	(Italy) Ducati Lenovo Team	781
2	(Italy) Prima Pramac Racing	608
3	(Italy) Gresini Racing MotoGP	491
4	(Italy) Aprilia Racing	323
5	(Italy) Pertamina Enduro VR46 Racing Team	302

=== Moto2 ===
Riders' Championship standings

	Pos.	Rider	Points
	1	(Japan) Ai Ogura	261
	2	(Spain) Arón Canet	201
1	3	(Spain) Sergio García	179
1	4	(Spain) Fermín Aldeguer	175
1	5	(Spain) Manuel González	170

Constructors' Championship standings

Pos.	Constructor	Points
1	(Germany) Kalex	387
2	(Italy) Boscoscuro	373
3	(Switzerland) Forward	16

Teams' Championship standings

	Pos.	Team	Points
	1	(Spain) MT Helmets – MSi	440
	2	(Italy) Beta Tools Speed Up	343
	3	(United States) OnlyFans American Racing Team	255
	4	(Italy) Gresini Moto2	246
1	5	(Italy) Fantic Racing	201

=== Moto3 ===
Riders' Championship standings

	Pos.	Rider	Points
	1	(Colombia) David Alonso	371
	2	(Spain) Daniel Holgado	236
	3	(Netherlands) Collin Veijer	225
	4	(Spain) Iván Ortolá	204
1	5	(Spain) David Muñoz	162

Constructors' Championship standings

	Pos.	Constructor	Points
	1	(China) CFMoto	371
	2	(Austria) KTM	304
	3	(Japan) Honda	264
1	4	(Sweden) Husqvarna	252
1	5	(Spain) Gas Gas	241

Teams' Championship standings

	Pos.	Team	Points
	1	(Spain) CFMoto Gaviota Aspar Team	416
	2	(Spain) MT Helmets – MSi	315
	3	(Germany) Liqui Moly Husqvarna Intact GP	313
1	4	(France) Red Bull GasGas Tech3	290
1	5	(Luxembourg) Leopard Racing	290

Previous race: 2024 Australian Grand Prix	FIM Grand Prix World Championship; 2024 season	Next race: 2024 Malaysian Grand Prix
Previous race: 2023 Thailand Grand Prix	Thailand motorcycle Grand Prix	Next race: 2025 Thailand Grand Prix
