= 2024 Japanese motorcycle Grand Prix =

Motorcycle races in Motegi

(Japan) 2024 Japanese Grand Prix
Race details
- Race 16 of 20 races in the 2024 Grand Prix motorcycle racing season
- Date: 6 October 2024
- Official name: Motul Grand Prix of Japan
- Location: Mobility Resort Motegi; Motegi, Japan
- Course: Permanent racing facility; 4.801 km (2.983 mi)

MotoGP
Pole position
| Rider | (Spain) Pedro Acosta | KTM |
| Time | 1:43.018 | |
Fastest lap
| Rider | (Spain) Jorge Martín | Ducati |
| Time | 1:44.461 on lap 5 | |
Podium
| First | (Italy) Francesco Bagnaia | Ducati |
| Second | (Spain) Jorge Martín | Ducati |
| Third | (Spain) Marc Márquez | Ducati |

Moto2
Pole position
| Rider | (United Kingdom) Jake Dixon | Kalex |
| Time | 1:52.693 | |
Fastest lap
| Rider | (Spain) Manuel González | Kalex |
| Time | 1:50.783 on lap 7 | |
Podium
| First | (Spain) Manuel González | Kalex |
| Second | (Japan) Ai Ogura | Boscoscuro |
| Third | (Czech Republic) Filip Salač | Kalex |

Moto3
Pole position
| Rider | (Spain) Iván Ortolá | KTM |
| Time | 1:54.761 | |
Fastest lap
| Rider | (Colombia) David Alonso | CFMoto |
| Time | 1:55.675 on lap 9 | |
Podium
| First | (Colombia) David Alonso | CFMoto |
| Second | (Netherlands) Collin Veijer | Husqvarna |
| Third | (Spain) Adrián Fernández | Honda |

The 2024 Japanese motorcycle Grand Prix (officially known as the Motul Grand Prix of Japan) was the sixteenth round of the 2024 Grand Prix motorcycle racing season. It was held at the Mobility Resort Motegi in Motegi on 6 October 2024.

In the Moto3 class, David Alonso won his tenth Grand Prix of the season and clinched the Riders' Championship.

== MotoGP Sprint ==
The MotoGP Sprint was held on 5 October.

| Pos. | No. | Rider | Team | Constructor | Laps | Time/Retired | Grid | Points |
|---|---|---|---|---|---|---|---|---|
| 1 | 1 | (Italy) Francesco Bagnaia | Ducati Lenovo Team | Ducati | 12 | 21:01.074 | 2 | 12 |
| 2 | 23 | (Italy) Enea Bastianini | Ducati Lenovo Team | Ducati | 12 | +0.181 | 4 | 9 |
| 3 | 93 | (Spain) Marc Márquez | Gresini Racing MotoGP | Ducati | 12 | +0.349 | 9 | 7 |
| 4 | 89 | (Spain) Jorge Martín | Prima Pramac Racing | Ducati | 12 | +2.498 | 11 | 6 |
| 5 | 21 | (Italy) Franco Morbidelli | Prima Pramac Racing | Ducati | 12 | +4.326 | 6 | 5 |
| 6 | 49 | (Italy) Fabio Di Giannantonio | Pertamina Enduro VR46 Racing Team | Ducati | 12 | +4.446 | 7 | 4 |
| 7 | 73 | (Spain) Álex Márquez | Gresini Racing MotoGP | Ducati | 12 | +11.444 | 10 | 3 |
| 8 | 43 | (Australia) Jack Miller | Red Bull KTM Factory Racing | KTM | 12 | +11.875 | 14 | 2 |
| 9 | 12 | (Spain) Maverick Viñales | Aprilia Racing | Aprilia | 12 | +11.947 | 3 | 1 |
| 10 | 72 | (Italy) Marco Bezzecchi | Pertamina Enduro VR46 Racing Team | Ducati | 12 | +12.299 | 8 | |
| 11 | 25 | (Spain) Raúl Fernández | Trackhouse Racing | Aprilia | 12 | +14.559 | 13 | |
| 12 | 20 | (France) Fabio Quartararo | Monster Energy Yamaha MotoGP Team | Yamaha | 12 | +14.645 | 12 | |
| 13 | 10 | (Italy) Luca Marini | Repsol Honda Team | Honda | 12 | +15.886 | 20 | |
| 14 | 5 | (France) Johann Zarco | Castrol Honda LCR | Honda | 12 | +16.170 | 16 | |
| 15 | 37 | (Spain) Augusto Fernández | Red Bull GasGas Tech3 | KTM | 12 | +20.522 | 18 | |
| 16 | 42 | (Spain) Álex Rins | Monster Energy Yamaha MotoGP Team | Yamaha | 12 | +24.415 | 19 | |
| 17 | 32 | (Italy) Lorenzo Savadori | Trackhouse Racing | Aprilia | 12 | +25.482 | 22 | |
| 18 | 87 | (Australia) Remy Gardner | Yamaha Factory Racing Team | Yamaha | 12 | +32.620 | 23 | |
| Ret | 36 | (Spain) Joan Mir | Repsol Honda Team | Honda | 11 | Retired | 17 | |
| Ret | 41 | (Spain) Aleix Espargaró | Aprilia Racing | Aprilia | 9 | Accident | 15 | |
| Ret | 31 | (Spain) Pedro Acosta | Red Bull GasGas Tech3 | KTM | 8 | Accident | 1 | |
| Ret | 30 | (Japan) Takaaki Nakagami | Idemitsu Honda LCR | Honda | 4 | Retired | 21 | |
| Ret | 33 | (South Africa) Brad Binder | Red Bull KTM Factory Racing | KTM | 2 | Technical issue | 5 | |
Fastest lap: (Spain) Pedro Acosta (KTM) – 1:43.825 (lap 2)
OFFICIAL MOTOGP SPRINT REPORT

== Race ==
=== MotoGP ===
| Pos. | No. | Rider | Team | Constructor | Laps | Time/Retired | Grid | Points |
|---|---|---|---|---|---|---|---|---|
| 1 | 1 | (Italy) Francesco Bagnaia | Ducati Lenovo Team | Ducati | 24 | 42:09.790 | 2 | 25 |
| 2 | 89 | (Spain) Jorge Martín | Prima Pramac Racing | Ducati | 24 | +1.189 | 11 | 20 |
| 3 | 93 | (Spain) Marc Márquez | Gresini Racing MotoGP | Ducati | 24 | +3.822 | 9 | 16 |
| 4 | 23 | (Italy) Enea Bastianini | Ducati Lenovo Team | Ducati | 24 | +4.358 | 4 | 13 |
| 5 | 21 | (Italy) Franco Morbidelli | Prima Pramac Racing | Ducati | 24 | +17.940 | 6 | 11 |
| 6 | 33 | (South Africa) Brad Binder | Red Bull KTM Factory Racing | KTM | 24 | +18.502 | 5 | 10 |
| 7 | 72 | (Italy) Marco Bezzecchi | Pertamina Enduro VR46 Racing Team | Ducati | 24 | +19.371 | 8 | 9 |
| 8 | 49 | (Italy) Fabio Di Giannantonio | Pertamina Enduro VR46 Racing Team | Ducati | 24 | +20.199 | 7 | 8 |
| 9 | 41 | (Spain) Aleix Espargaró | Aprilia Racing | Aprilia | 24 | +30.442 | 15 | 7 |
| 10 | 43 | (Australia) Jack Miller | Red Bull KTM Factory Racing | KTM | 24 | +31.184 | 14 | 6 |
| 11 | 5 | (France) Johann Zarco | Castrol Honda LCR | Honda | 24 | +31.567 | 16 | 5 |
| 12 | 20 | (France) Fabio Quartararo | Monster Energy Yamaha MotoGP Team | Yamaha | 24 | +32.299 | 12 | 4 |
| 13 | 30 | (Japan) Takaaki Nakagami | Idemitsu Honda LCR | Honda | 24 | +33.003 | 21 | 3 |
| 14 | 10 | (Italy) Luca Marini | Repsol Honda Team | Honda | 24 | +35.974 | 20 | 2 |
| 15 | 25 | (Spain) Raúl Fernández | Trackhouse Racing | Aprilia | 24 | +39.321 | 13 | 1 |
| 16 | 42 | (Spain) Álex Rins | Monster Energy Yamaha MotoGP Team | Yamaha | 24 | +40.839 | 19 | |
| 17 | 87 | (Australia) Remy Gardner | Yamaha Factory Racing Team | Yamaha | 24 | +59.547 | 23 | |
| Ret | 31 | (Spain) Pedro Acosta | Red Bull GasGas Tech3 | KTM | 12 | Retired | 1 | |
| Ret | 12 | (Spain) Maverick Viñales | Aprilia Racing | Aprilia | 11 | Accident | 3 | |
| Ret | 37 | (Spain) Augusto Fernández | Red Bull GasGas Tech3 | KTM | 6 | Accident | 18 | |
| Ret | 32 | (Italy) Lorenzo Savadori | Trackhouse Racing | Aprilia | 0 | Retired | 22 | |
| Ret | 73 | (Spain) Álex Márquez | Gresini Racing MotoGP | Ducati | 0 | Collision | 10 | |
| Ret | 36 | (Spain) Joan Mir | Repsol Honda Team | Honda | 0 | Collision | 17 | |
Fastest lap: (Spain) Jorge Martín (Ducati) – 1:44.461 (lap 5)
OFFICIAL MOTOGP RACE REPORT

== Championship standings after the race ==
Below are the standings for the top five riders, constructors, and teams after the round.

=== MotoGP ===
Riders' Championship standings

| | Pos. | Rider | Points |
|---|---|---|---|
| | 1 | (Spain) Jorge Martín | 392 |
| | 2 | (Italy) Francesco Bagnaia | 382 |
| | 3 | (Italy) Enea Bastianini | 313 |
| | 4 | (Spain) Marc Márquez | 311 |
| 1 | 5 | (South Africa) Brad Binder | 183 |

Constructors' Championship standings

| Pos. | Constructor | Points |
|---|---|---|
| 1 | (Italy) Ducati | 574 |
| 2 | (Austria) KTM | 275 |
| 3 | (Italy) Aprilia | 255 |
| 4 | (Japan) Yamaha | 97 |
| 5 | (Japan) Honda | 56 |

Teams' Championship standings

| Pos. | Team | Points |
|---|---|---|
| 1 | (Italy) Ducati Lenovo Team | 695 |
| 2 | (Italy) Prima Pramac Racing | 528 |
| 3 | (Italy) Gresini Racing MotoGP | 435 |
| 4 | (Italy) Aprilia Racing | 297 |
| 5 | (Italy) Pertamina Enduro VR46 Racing Team | 268 |

=== Moto2 ===
Riders' Championship standings

| | Pos. | Rider | Points |
|---|---|---|---|
| | 1 | (Japan) Ai Ogura | 228 |
| | 2 | (Spain) Sergio García | 168 |
| 1 | 3 | (Spain) Alonso López | 163 |
| 1 | 4 | (Spain) Arón Canet | 156 |
| | 5 | (United States) Joe Roberts | 153 |

Constructors' Championship standings

| Pos. | Constructor | Points |
|---|---|---|
| 1 | (Germany) Kalex | 342 |
| 2 | (Italy) Boscoscuro | 328 |
| 3 | (Switzerland) Forward | 16 |

Teams' Championship standings

| | Pos. | Team | Points |
|---|---|---|---|
| | 1 | (Spain) MT Helmets – MSi | 396 |
| | 2 | (Italy) Beta Tools Speed Up | 313 |
| | 3 | (United States) OnlyFans American Racing Team | 232 |
| | 4 | (Italy) QJmotor Gresini Moto2 | 218 |
| 1 | 5 | (Belgium) Elf Marc VDS Racing Team | 184 |

=== Moto3 ===
Riders' Championship standings

| | Pos. | Rider | Points |
|---|---|---|---|
| | 1 | (Colombia) David Alonso | 321 |
| | 2 | (Spain) Daniel Holgado | 212 |
| 1 | 3 | (Netherlands) Collin Veijer | 209 |
| 1 | 4 | (Spain) Iván Ortolá | 191 |
| | 5 | (Spain) David Muñoz | 141 |

Constructors' Championship standings

| Pos. | Constructor | Points |
|---|---|---|
| 1 | (China) CFMoto | 321 |
| 2 | (Austria) KTM | 278 |
| 3 | (Sweden) Husqvarna | 235 |
| 4 | (Japan) Honda | 228 |
| 5 | (Spain) Gas Gas | 217 |

Teams' Championship standings

| | Pos. | Team | Points |
|---|---|---|---|
| | 1 | (Spain) CFMoto Gaviota Aspar Team | 366 |
| 1 | 2 | (Germany) Liqui Moly Husqvarna Intact GP | 290 |
| 1 | 3 | (Spain) MT Helmets – MSi | 287 |
| | 4 | (Luxembourg) Leopard Racing | 268 |
| | 5 | (France) Red Bull GasGas Tech3 | 262 |

| Previous race: 2024 Indonesian Grand Prix | FIM Grand Prix World Championship; 2024 season | Next race: 2024 Australian Grand Prix |
| Previous race: 2023 Japanese Grand Prix | Japanese motorcycle Grand Prix | Next race: 2025 Japanese Grand Prix |
