= Filippo Farioli =

Italian motorcycle racer (born 2005)

- Nationality: Italian
- Born: 4 April 2005 (age 21); Bergamo, Italy
- Current team: VFT Racing
- Bike number: 7
Motorcycle racing career statistics
Moto3 World Championship
Active years	2022–2024
Manufacturers	Gas Gas (2022); KTM (2023); Honda (2024)
2024 championship position	19th (32 pts)
Starts / Wins / Podiums / Poles / F. laps / Points; 41 / 0 / 0 / 0 / 0 / 51
Supersport World Championship
Active years	2025–
Manufacturers	MV Agusta (2025); Yamaha (2026)
Championships	0
2025 championship position	11th (98 pts)
Starts / Wins / Podiums / Poles / F. laps / Points; 46 / 0 / 2 / 1 / 1 / 231
- Sports career
- Club: Fiamme Oro

Filippo Farioli (born 4 April 2005) is an Italian Grand Prix motorcycle racer who competes in the Supersport World Championship for VFT Racing. He previously competed in the Moto3 World Championship in 2022, 2023 and 2024.

== Career ==
=== Early career ===
Born in Bergamo, Italy, Farioli comes from a well-established motorcycle racing family. His grandfather Arnaldo was a multiple-time Italian enduro champion, while his uncle Fabio won the Enduro World Championship in 1993. His father, Paolo, competed in supermoto. Farioli began riding motorcycles at the age of five, starting with motocross and winning the 2018 Lombardy Regional Minicross 85cc Championship, before switching to road racing around the age of 13.

In 2019, Farioli competed in the Italian CIV PreMoto3, where he claimed several wins, and finished third overall, behind Luca Lunetta. In 2020, he moved up to the European Talent Cup with Team Honda Laglisse. He opened the season with a fifth-place finish at Estoril, but missed the final two rounds at Valencia due to injury and placed 20th overall.

Farioli was selected to compete in the 2021 Red Bull MotoGP Rookies Cup, as well as the FIM CEV Moto3 Junior World Championship. He finished his debut season in the Rookies Cup in 15th place, with several top-ten finishes and a best result of seventh at Sachsenring. His best result in the FIM CEV Moto3 was an eleventh place at Jerez. For 2022, Farioli would switch to the Junior Aspar Team for the newly rebranded FIM JuniorGP World Championship, where he claimed his maiden win on home soil at Misano, along with five additional podiums, finishing third in the standings. That same year, he faced his second Red Bull MotoGP Rookies Cup season, where he claimed two podiums. Farioli made his Grand Prix debut as a wildcard at the final round in Valencia, finishing in 19th place.

=== Moto3 World Championship ===
==== Tech3 Racing (2023) ====
On 24 September 2022, Tech3 Racing announced Farioli would be stepping up to the 2023 Moto3 World Championship alongside Daniel Holgado. His rookie season in the World Championship was somewhat inconsistent; he scored points on four occasions, with a best finish of eighth at Malaysia.

==== Sic58 Squadra Corse (2024) ====
Farioli switched teams for his second Moto3 season, joining Sic58 Squadra Corse, alongside fellow Italian rookie Luca Lunetta. This time on board of a Honda NSF250RW, he showed modest improvement, scoring points in more races, including two top-ten finishes, and a season-best result of ninth at Catalunya. Despite his gradual improvement, the team parted ways with Farioli at the end of the season.

=== Supersport World Championship ===
==== MV Agusta Reparto Corse (2025) ====
On 10 November 2024, it was announced Farioli would leave Moto3 to join the 2025 Supersport World Championship with MV Agusta Reparto Corse. He had a strong rookie season in the category, securing eight top-ten finishes, a pole position at Misano, and a best result of fourth at Balaton Park.

==== VFT Racing (2026) ====
Shortly after the end of the 2025 season, VFT Racing announced Farioli would be joining their team for the 2026 season, aboard a YZF-R9.

== Career statistics ==
=== European Talent Cup ===
==== Races by year ====
(key) (Races in bold indicate pole position; races in italics indicate fastest lap)

Year	Bike	1	2	3	4	5	6	7	8	9	10	11	Pos	Pts
2020	Honda	EST; 5	EST; 12	ALG; 15	JER; 17	JER; 20	JER; DNS	ARA; 14	ARA; Ret	ARA; 19	VAL	VAL	20th	18

=== Red Bull MotoGP Rookies Cup ===
==== Races by year ====
(key) (Races in bold indicate pole position; races in italics indicate fastest lap)

Year	Bike	1		2		3		4		5		6		7		Pos	Pts
Year	Bike	R1	R2	R1	R2	R1	R2	R1	R2	R1	R2	R1	R2	R1	R2	Pos	Pts
2021	KTM	POR; 11	POR; 18	JER; 16	JER; Ret	MUG; 20	MUG; 9	SAC; 7	SAC; 10	RBR; 12	RBR; 12	RBR; 10	RBR; 13	ARA; 10	ARA; 10	15th	56
2022	KTM	POR; Ret	POR; DNS	JER; 6	JER; 7	**MUG**; 9	**MUG**; 2	SAC; 7	SAC; 3	RBR; 14	RBR; 7	ARA; Ret	ARA; 5	VAL	VAL	9th	93

=== FIM CEV Moto3 Junior World Championship ===
==== Races by year ====
(key) (Races in bold indicate pole position; races in italics indicate fastest lap)

Year	Bike	1	2	3	4	5	6	7	8	9	10	11	12	Pos	Pts
2021	Husqvarna	EST; 27	VAL1; 22	VAL2; DNS	CAT1; 24	CAT2; Ret	POR; 25	ARA; 24	JER1; 11	JER2; Ret	RSM; Ret	VAL1	VAL2	28th	5

=== FIM JuniorGP World Championship ===
==== Races by year ====
(key) (Races in bold indicate pole position; races in italics indicate fastest lap)

Year	Bike	1	2	3	4	5	6	7	8	9	10	11	12	Pos	Pts
2022	Gas Gas	EST; 8	VAL1; Ret	VAL2; 2	CAT1; 3	CAT2; 3	JER1; 5	JER2; 7	POR; 24	RSM; 1	ARA; 8	VAL1; 3	VAL2; 2	3rd	149

=== Grand Prix motorcycle racing ===
==== By season ====
Season	Class	Motorcycle	Team	Race	Win	Podium	Pole	FLap	Pts	Plcd
2022	Moto3	Gas Gas	Aspar Team	1	0	0	0	0	0	33rd
2023	Moto3	KTM	Red Bull KTM Tech3	20	0	0	0	0	19	24th
2024	Moto3	Honda	Sic58 Squadra Corse	20	0	0	0	0	32	19th
Total				**41**	**0**	**0**	**0**	**0**	**51**	

==== By class ====
Class	Seasons	1st GP	1st pod	1st win	Race	Win	Podiums	Pole	FLap	Pts	WChmp
Moto3	2022–2024	2022 Valencia			41	0	0	0	0	51	0
Total	2022–2024				**41**	**0**	**0**	**0**	**0**	**51**	**0**

==== Races by year ====
(key) (Races in bold indicate pole position; races in italics indicate fastest lap)

Year	Class	Bike	1	2	3	4	5	6	7	8	9	10	11	12	13	14	15	16	17	18	19	20	Pos	Pts
2022	Moto3	Gas Gas	QAT	INA	ARG	AME	POR	SPA	FRA	ITA	CAT	GER	NED	GBR	AUT	RSM	ARA	JPN	THA	AUS	MAL	VAL; 19	33rd	0
2023	Moto3	KTM	POR; Ret	ARG; 20	AME; 18	SPA; 14	FRA; 18	ITA; Ret	GER; 21	NED; 21	GBR; 19	AUT; 21	CAT; Ret	RSM; 21	IND; 11	JPN; 16	INA; 20	AUS; Ret	THA; 19	MAL; 8	QAT; Ret	VAL; 12	24th	19
2024	Moto3	Honda	QAT; Ret	POR; 16	AME; 15	SPA; 13	FRA; Ret	CAT; 9	ITA; 19	NED; 22	GER; 13	GBR; 16	AUT; 26	ARA; Ret	RSM; 10	EMI; 12	INA; Ret	JPN; 13	AUS; Ret	THA; 14	MAL; 13	SLD; 20	19th	32

=== Supersport World Championship ===
==== By season ====
Season	Motorcycle	Team	Race	Win	Podium	Pole	FLap	Pts	Plcd
2025	MV Agusta F3 800 RR	MV Agusta Reparto Corse	22	0	0	1	1	98	11th
2026	Yamaha YZF-R9	VFT Racing	24	0	2	0	0	133	12th
Total			**46**	**0**	**2**	**1**	**1**	**231**	

==== By year ====
(key) (Races in bold indicate pole position; races in italics indicate fastest lap)

Year	Bike	1		2		3		4		5		6		7		8		9		10		11		12		Pos	Pts
Year	Bike	R1	R2	R1	R2	R1	R2	R1	R2	R1	R2	R1	R2	R1	R2	R1	R2	R1	R2	R1	R2	R1	R2	R1	R2	Pos	Pts
2025	MV Agusta	AUS; WD	AUS; WD	POR; 15	POR; 12	NED; 11	NED; 21	ITA; 8	ITA; 6	CZE; NC	CZE; 13	EMI; NC	**EMI**; Ret	GBR; NC	GBR; 13	HUN; 4	HUN; Ret	FRA; 7	FRA; 7	ARA; 5	ARA; 8	POR; 11	POR; Ret	SPA; 14	SPA; 9	11th	98
2026	Yamaha	AUS; 15	AUS; 13	POR; 15	POR; 16	NED; 12	NED; 12	HUN; Ret	HUN; Ret	CZE; 8	CZE; 9	ARA; 13	ARA; 15	EMI; Ret	EMI; 8	GBR; 10	GBR; 15	FRA; 9	FRA; 6	ITA; 3	ITA; 4	POR; 11	POR; 2	SPA; 8	SPA; 10	12th	133
