= 2024 Moto3 World Championship =

13th running of the Moto3 World Championship

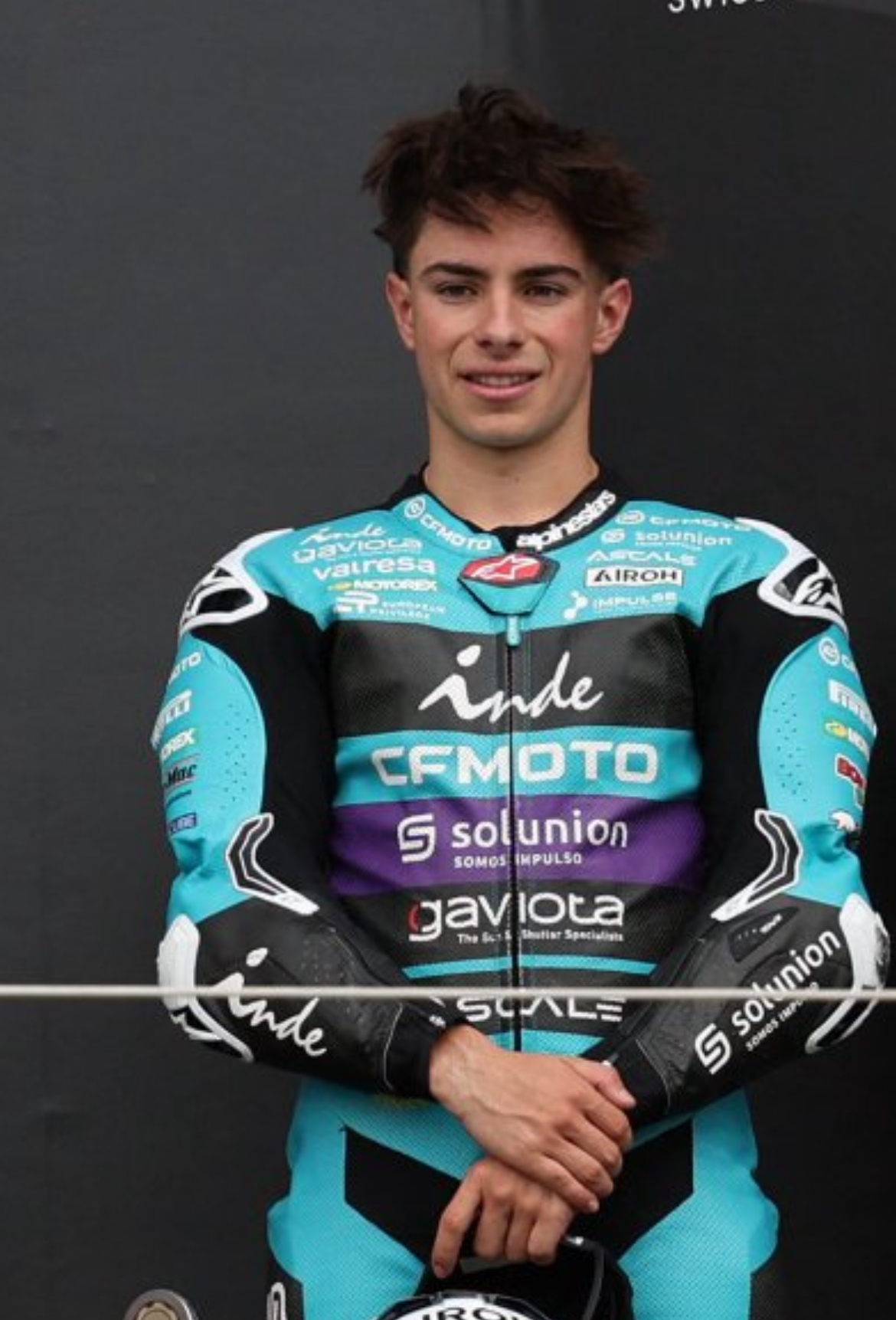
David Alonso (pictured in 2025) was the 2024 Moto3 World Riders' Champion.

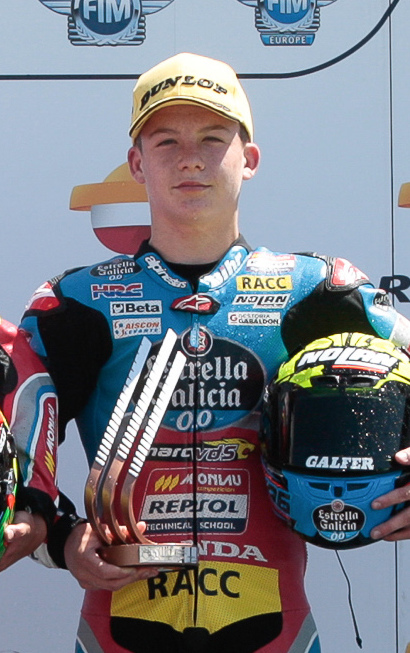
Daniel Holgado (pictured in 2019) finished runner-up.

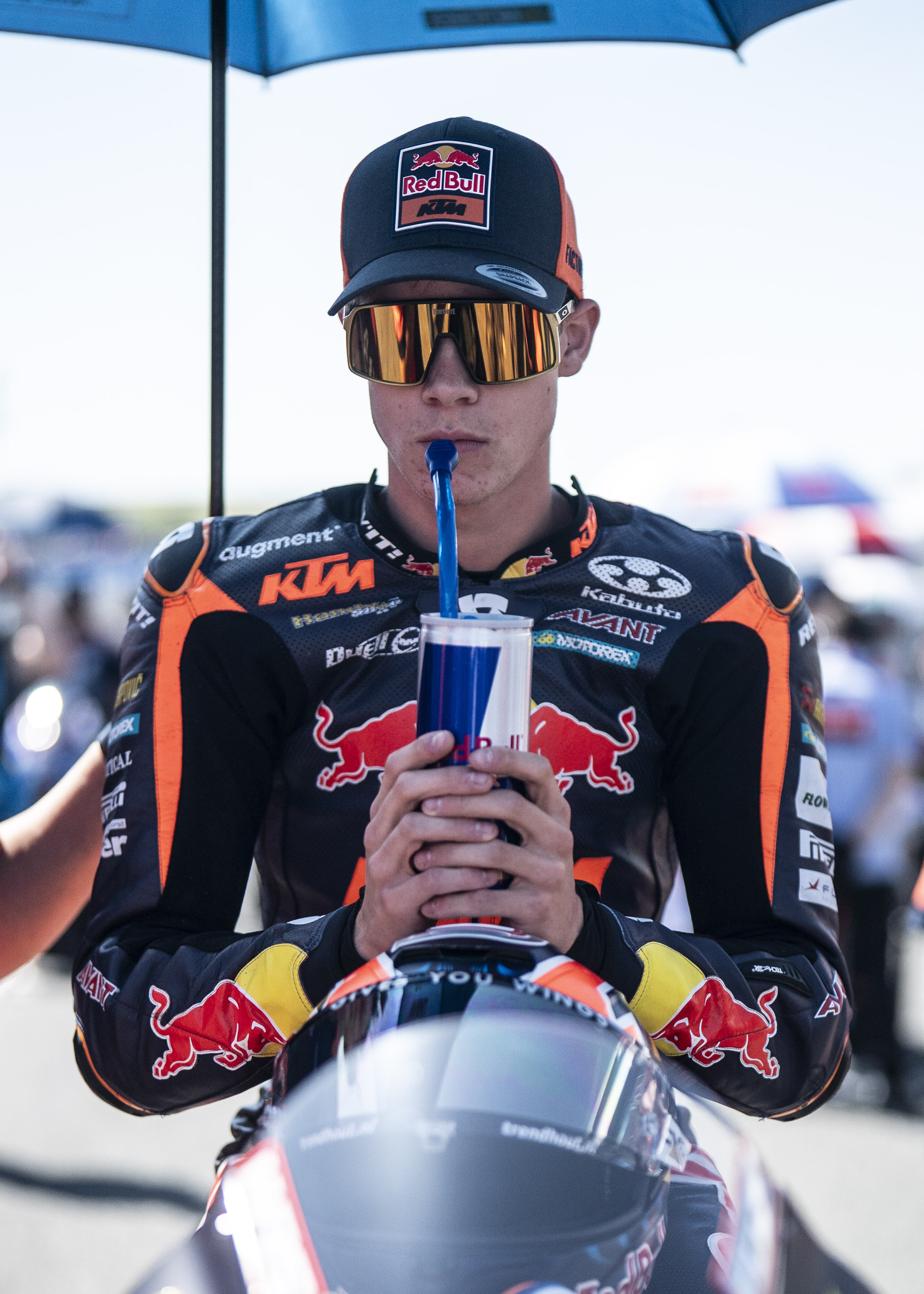
Collin Veijer (pictured in 2025) finished third.

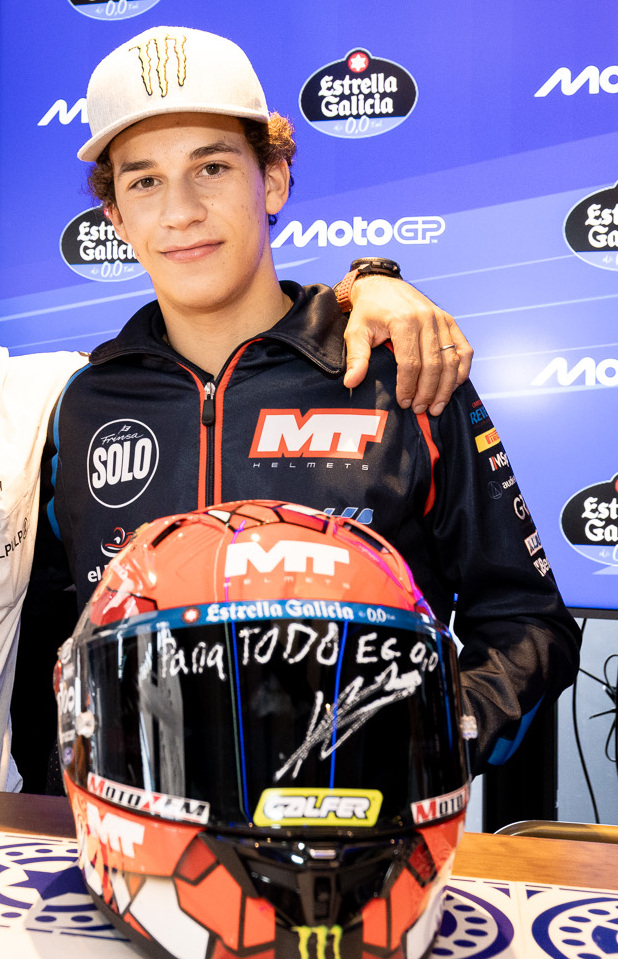
Ángel Piqueras (pictured in 2025), the 2024 Moto3 Rookie of the Year.

The 2024 FIM Moto3 World Championship was the lightweight class of the 76th Fédération Internationale de Motocyclisme (FIM) Road Racing World Championship season. David Alonso won the championship with four races to spare after winning the Japanese Grand Prix.

== Teams and riders ==
Team	Constructor	Motorcycle	No.	Rider	Rounds
(Spain) CFMoto Aspar Team (Note: This is the team name entered in the championship. Other team names used during the season are CFMoto Gaviota Aspar Team (rounds 2, 4–6, 8–9, 11–19) and CFMoto Valresa Aspar Team (rounds 3, 7, 10, 20).)	CFMoto	Moto3	78	(Spain) Joel Esteban	1–19
(Spain) CFMoto Aspar Team	CFMoto	Moto3	89	(Spain) Marcos Uriarte	20
(Spain) CFMoto Aspar Team	CFMoto	Moto3	80	(Colombia) David Alonso	All
(France) Red Bull GasGas Tech3	GasGas	RC250GP	12	(Australia) Jacob Roulstone	All
(France) Red Bull GasGas Tech3	GasGas	RC250GP	96	(Spain) Daniel Holgado	All
(Japan) Honda Team Asia	Honda	NSF250RW	5	(Thailand) Tatchakorn Buasri	All
(Japan) Honda Team Asia	Honda	NSF250RW	72	(Japan) Taiyo Furusato	1–9, 11–20
(Japan) Honda Team Asia	Honda	NSF250RW	93	(Indonesia) Fadillah Arbi Aditama	6, 12, 15
(Luxembourg) Leopard Racing	Honda	NSF250RW	31	(Spain) Adrián Fernández	All
(Luxembourg) Leopard Racing	Honda	NSF250RW	36	(Spain) Ángel Piqueras	All
(United Kingdom) MLav Racing (Note: From rounds 10 to 12, the team used the team name Fibre Tec Honda – MLav Racing. From round 13 onwards, the team used the team name FleetSafe Honda – MLav Racing.)	Honda	NSF250RW	19	(United Kingdom) Scott Ogden	All
(United Kingdom) MLav Racing	Honda	NSF250RW	70	(United Kingdom) Joshua Whatley	1–9
(United Kingdom) MLav Racing	Honda	NSF250RW	21	(Spain) Vicente Pérez	10–14
(United Kingdom) MLav Racing	Honda	NSF250RW	8	(United Kingdom) Eddie O'Shea	15, 17–20
(United Kingdom) MLav Racing	Honda	NSF250RW	32	(Japan) Rei Wakamatsu	16
(Italy) Rivacold Snipers Team (Note: From round 5 onwards, the team used the team name Kopron Rivacold Snipers Team.)	Honda	NSF250RW	18	(Italy) Matteo Bertelle	All
(Italy) Rivacold Snipers Team	Honda	NSF250RW	22	(Spain) David Almansa	1, 3–20
(Italy) Rivacold Snipers Team	Honda	NSF250RW	71	(Qatar) Hamad Al-Sahouti	2
(Italy) Sic58 Squadra Corse	Honda	NSF250RW	7	(Italy) Filippo Farioli	All
(Italy) Sic58 Squadra Corse	Honda	NSF250RW	58	(Italy) Luca Lunetta	1–9, 11–20
(Italy) Sic58 Squadra Corse	Honda	NSF250RW	57	(Malaysia) Danial Shahril	10
(Germany) Liqui Moly Husqvarna Intact GP	Husqvarna	FR250GP	24	(Japan) Tatsuki Suzuki	All
(Germany) Liqui Moly Husqvarna Intact GP	Husqvarna	FR250GP	95	(Netherlands) Collin Veijer	All
(Germany) Liqui Moly Husqvarna Intact GP	Husqvarna	FR250GP	34	(Austria) Jakob Rosenthaler	11, 13
(Spain) Boé Motorsports	KTM	RC250GP	64	(Spain) David Muñoz	All
(Spain) Boé Motorsports	KTM	RC250GP	66	(Australia) Joel Kelso	All
(France) CIP Green Power	KTM	RC250GP	54	(Italy) Riccardo Rossi	All
(France) CIP Green Power	KTM	RC250GP	55	(Switzerland) Noah Dettwiler	All
(Italy) LevelUp – MTA	KTM	RC250GP	10	(Italy) Nicola Carraro	All
(Italy) LevelUp – MTA	KTM	RC250GP	82	(Italy) Stefano Nepa	All
(Spain) MT Helmets – MSi	KTM	RC250GP	6	(Japan) Ryusei Yamanaka	All
(Spain) MT Helmets – MSi	KTM	RC250GP	48	(Spain) Iván Ortolá	All
(Finland) Red Bull KTM Ajo	KTM	RC250GP	85	(Spain) Xabi Zurutuza	3–20
(Finland) Red Bull KTM Ajo	KTM	RC250GP	21	(Spain) Vicente Pérez	1–2
(Finland) Red Bull KTM Ajo	KTM	RC250GP	99	(Spain) José Antonio Rueda	All (Note: José Antonio Rueda was entered during round 4, but withdrew without competing in any of the sessions due to a stomach infection and was replaced by Vicente Pérez for the rest of the round.)
(Finland) Red Bull KTM Ajo	KTM	RC250GP	21	(Spain) Vicente Pérez	4
(Finland) Red Bull KTM Ajo	KTM	RC250GP	83	(Spain) Álvaro Carpe	20

Key
Regular rider
Replacement rider
Wildcard rider

All teams used series-specified Pirelli tyres.

=== Team changes ===
- Prüstel GP left Moto3 class after 16 seasons in Grand Prix motorcycle racing.
- Aspar Team switched from GasGas to CFMoto branding, while GasGas was diverted to Tech3.

=== Rider changes ===
- Ángel Piqueras made his Grand Prix racing debut with Leopard Racing, replacing 2023 Moto3 champion Jaume Masià who moves up to Moto2. Piqueras was both the 2023 FIM JuniorGP World Champion and Red Bull MotoGP Rookies Cup winner.
- David Almansa made his full-time Moto3 debut with Rivacold Snipers Team, replacing Romano Fenati who left the championship as he is above the age limit of 28 when the season starts. Almansa previously served as a wildcard rider in 2022, and both as a replacement and wildcard rider in 2023. He also raced in the 2023 FIM JuniorGP World Championship.
- Nicola Carraro made his full-time Moto3 debut with MTA Team, replacing Iván Ortolá. Carraro previously served as a replacement rider in 2022 and 2023, and also raced in the 2023 FIM JuniorGP World Championship.
- Xabi Zurutuza made his Grand Prix racing debut with Red Bull KTM Ajo, replacing Deniz Öncü who is promoted to Moto2 with the same team. Zurutuza raced in the FIM JuniorGP World Championship in 2023.
- Joel Esteban made his Grand Prix racing debut with CFMoto Aspar Team, replacing Ryusei Yamanaka. Esteban raced in the FIM JuniorGP World Championship in 2023.
- Jacob Roulstone made his Grand Prix racing debut with Red Bull GasGas Tech3, replacing Filippo Farioli. Roulstone raced in both the FIM JuniorGP World Championship and Red Bull MotoGP Rookies Cup in 2023.
- Tatsuki Suzuki moved to Liqui Moly Husqvarna Intact GP from Leopard Racing, replacing 2023 Moto3 runner-up Ayumu Sasaki who moves up to Moto2.
- Tatchakorn Buasri made his full-time Moto3 debut with Honda Team Asia, replacing Mario Aji who is promoted to Moto2 with the same team. Buasri previously served as a wildcard rider for the team in 2023, and also raced in the 2023 FIM JuniorGP World Championship.
- Joel Kelso moved to Boé Motorsports from the now defunct Prüstel GP, replacing Ana Carrasco.
- Filippo Farioli and Luca Lunetta raced for Sic58 Squadra Corse, replacing Kaito Toba who moved to the Supersport World Championship, and Riccardo Rossi who was supposed to move to the now defunct Prüstel GP. Farioli moved from Red Bull KTM Tech3, while Lunetta made his full-time Moto3 debut, having served as a replacement rider in 2022 and as a wildcard rider in 2023. Lunetta also raced in the 2023 FIM JuniorGP World Championship.
- Ryusei Yamanaka and Iván Ortolá raced for MT Helmets – MSi, replacing Diogo Moreira who moves up to Moto2, and Syarifuddin Azman.
- Riccardo Rossi and Noah Dettwiler raced for CIP Green Power, replacing David Salvador and Lorenzo Fellon who were both left without a ride. Rossi moved from Sic58 Squadra Corse, while Dettwiler made his full-time Moto3 debut, having served as a replacement and wildcard rider in 2023. Dettwiler also raced in the 2023 FIM JuniorGP World Championship.

==== Mid-season changes ====
- Xabi Zurutuza missed the first two rounds due to him being under the minimum age. He was replaced for both races by Vicente Pérez.
- David Almansa missed the Portuguese round due to a fractured hand and was replaced by Hamad Al-Sahouti.
- José Antonio Rueda was entered during the Spanish round, but withdrew before competing in any of the sessions due to a stomach infection. He was replaced by Vicente Pérez for the rest of the round.
- Joshua Whatley parted ways with his team after the German round. He was replaced full-time by Eddie O'Shea. However, as O'Shea can only race starting from the Indonesian round for being under the age limit, Whatley was replaced by Vicente Pérez between the British and Emilia Romagna rounds. O'Shea also missed the Japanese round after sustaining a right hand fracture from the previous Indonesian round. He was replaced by Rei Wakamatsu.
- Taiyo Furusato missed the British round due to a collarbone fracture sustained in a training accident. He was not replaced.
- Luca Lunetta missed the British round due to an injury sustained in the previous German race and was replaced by Danial Shahril.
- Joel Esteban missed the Solidarity round after suffering an injury in the scaphoid in his left hand during the previous Malaysian race and was replaced by Marcos Uriarte.

== Rule changes ==
The Friday morning first practice session will be designated as Free Practice and will not be timed for qualifying.

== Calendar ==
The following Grands Prix took place in 2024:

Round	Date	Grand Prix	Circuit
1	10 March	Qatar Airways Grand Prix of Qatar	Lusail International Circuit, Lusail
2	24 March	Grande Prémio Tissot de Portugal	Algarve International Circuit, Portimão
3	14 April	(United States) Red Bull Grand Prix of the Americas	Circuit of the Americas, Austin
4	28 April	(Spain) Gran Premio Estrella Galicia 0,0 de España	Circuito de Jerez, Jerez de la Frontera
5	12 May	Michelin Grand Prix de France	Bugatti Circuit, Le Mans
6	26 May	(Catalonia) Gran Premi Monster Energy de Catalunya	Circuit de Barcelona-Catalunya, Montmeló
7	2 June	(Italy) Gran Premio d'Italia Brembo	Mugello Circuit, Scarperia e San Piero
8	30 June	(Netherlands) Motul TT Assen	TT Circuit Assen, Assen
9	7 July	(Germany) Liqui Moly Motorrad Grand Prix Deutschland	Sachsenring, Hohenstein-Ernstthal
10	4 August	(United Kingdom) Monster Energy British Grand Prix	Silverstone Circuit, Silverstone
11	18 August	(Austria) Motorrad Grand Prix von Österreich	Red Bull Ring, Spielberg
12	1 September	(Aragon) Gran Premio GoPro de Aragón	MotorLand Aragón, Alcañiz
13	8 September	Gran Premio Red Bull di San Marino e della Riviera di Rimini	Misano World Circuit, Misano Adriatico
14	22 September	Gran Premio Pramac dell'Emilia-Romagna	Misano World Circuit, Misano Adriatico
15	29 September	Pertamina Grand Prix of Indonesia	Mandalika International Street Circuit, Mandalika
16	6 October	Motul Grand Prix of Japan	Motegi Circuit, Motegi
17	20 October	(Australia) Qatar Airways Australian Motorcycle Grand Prix	Phillip Island Grand Prix Circuit, Phillip Island
18	27 October	PT Grand Prix of Thailand	Buriram International Circuit, Buriram
19	3 November	Petronas Grand Prix of Malaysia	Sepang International Circuit, Sepang
20	17 November	Motul Solidarity Grand Prix of Barcelona	Circuit de Barcelona-Catalunya, Montmeló
Cancelled Grands Prix
–	~~7 April~~	(Argentina) Argentine Republic motorcycle Grand Prix	Autódromo Termas de Río Hondo, Termas de Río Hondo
–	~~16 June~~; ~~22 September~~	Kazakhstan motorcycle Grand Prix	Sokol International Racetrack, Almaty
–	~~22 September~~	(India) Indian motorcycle Grand Prix	Buddh International Circuit, Greater Noida
–	~~17 November~~	Valencian Community motorcycle Grand Prix	Circuit Ricardo Tormo, Valencia

=== Grand Prix locations ===
Location of non-European Grands Prix in 2024.
(scheduled Grand Prix: cancelled Grand Prix)
Location of European Grands Prix in 2024.
(scheduled Grand Prix: cancelled Grand Prix)

=== Calendar changes ===
- The Qatar Grand Prix returned as the season opener after being the penultimate round in 2023.
- The Kazakhstan Grand Prix is set to make its debut this season after its cancellation in 2023 due to homologation works at the circuit along with global operational challenges. With the introduction of this Grand Prix, the German Grand Prix was returned to its traditional calendar slot in early July, after the Dutch TT and before the season's summer break.
- The Aragon Grand Prix returned this season after not being held in 2023.
- The Argentine Grand Prix was cancelled on 31 January, due to "current circumstances" in the country's on-going economic crisis. The event was not replaced.
- The Kazakhstan Grand Prix was "postponed until later in the season" on 3 May, due to the on-going Central Asian flooding. It was announced on 29 May that it will be held on 22 September, the date which the Indian Grand Prix is scheduled to be held. It was also announced on the same day the Grand Prix of India will not be held in 2024 and will be postponed to March 2025. On 15 July, it was announced that the Kazakhstan Grand Prix would not take place, and its date would be replaced by a second round at Misano.
- The Valencian Grand Prix which was initially scheduled to be held as the season finale on 17 November was cancelled due to the October 2024 Spanish floods. On 5 November, it was announced that a second Grand Prix at Barcelona would host the season finale, with the Grand Prix name being the Solidarity Grand Prix.

== Results and standings ==
=== Grands Prix ===
Round	Grand Prix	Pole position	Fastest lap	Winning rider	Winning team	Winning constructor	Report
1	Qatar motorcycle Grand Prix	(Spain) Daniel Holgado	(Japan) Tatsuki Suzuki	(Colombia) David Alonso	(Spain) CFMoto Aspar Team	(China) CFMoto	Report
2	(Portugal) Portuguese motorcycle Grand Prix	(Spain) José Antonio Rueda	(Colombia) David Alonso	(Spain) Daniel Holgado	(France) Red Bull GasGas Tech3	(Spain) GasGas	Report
3	(United States) Motorcycle Grand Prix of the Americas	(Colombia) David Alonso	(Spain) Daniel Holgado	(Colombia) David Alonso	(Spain) CFMoto Valresa Aspar Team	(China) CFMoto	Report
4	(Spain) Spanish motorcycle Grand Prix	(Colombia) David Alonso	(Japan) Ryusei Yamanaka	(Netherlands) Collin Veijer	(Germany) Liqui Moly Husqvarna Intact GP	(Sweden) Husqvarna	Report
5	(France) French motorcycle Grand Prix	(Colombia) David Alonso	(Spain) Joel Esteban	(Colombia) David Alonso	(Spain) CFMoto Gaviota Aspar Team	(China) CFMoto	Report
6	(Catalonia) Catalan motorcycle Grand Prix	(Spain) Iván Ortolá	(Spain) José Antonio Rueda	(Colombia) David Alonso	(Spain) CFMoto Gaviota Aspar Team	(China) CFMoto	Report
7	(Italy) Italian motorcycle Grand Prix	(Colombia) David Alonso	(Netherlands) Collin Veijer	(Colombia) David Alonso	(Spain) CFMoto Valresa Aspar Team	(China) CFMoto	Report
8	(Netherlands) Dutch TT	(Spain) Ángel Piqueras	(Spain) Adrián Fernández	(Spain) Iván Ortolá	(Spain) MT Helmets – MSi	(Austria) KTM	Report
9	(Germany) German motorcycle Grand Prix	(Netherlands) Collin Veijer	(Spain) Iván Ortolá	(Colombia) David Alonso	(Spain) CFMoto Gaviota Aspar Team	(China) CFMoto	Report
10	(United Kingdom) British motorcycle Grand Prix	(Spain) Iván Ortolá	(Spain) Adrián Fernández	(Spain) Iván Ortolá	(Spain) MT Helmets – MSi	(Austria) KTM	Report
11	(Austria) Austrian motorcycle Grand Prix	(Spain) Iván Ortolá	(Japan) Tatsuki Suzuki	(Colombia) David Alonso	(Spain) CFMoto Gaviota Aspar Team	(China) CFMoto	Report
12	Aragon motorcycle Grand Prix	(Colombia) David Alonso	(Spain) José Antonio Rueda	(Spain) José Antonio Rueda	(Finland) Red Bull KTM Ajo	(Austria) KTM	Report
13	San Marino and Rimini Riviera motorcycle Grand Prix	(Colombia) David Alonso	(Spain) Ángel Piqueras	(Spain) Ángel Piqueras	(Luxembourg) Leopard Racing	(Japan) Honda	Report
14	(Emilia-Romagna) Emilia Romagna motorcycle Grand Prix	(Japan) Taiyo Furusato	(Netherlands) Collin Veijer	(Colombia) David Alonso	(Spain) CFMoto Gaviota Aspar Team	(China) CFMoto	Report
15	(Indonesia) Indonesian motorcycle Grand Prix	(Spain) Iván Ortolá	(Spain) Daniel Holgado	(Colombia) David Alonso	(Spain) CFMoto Gaviota Aspar Team	(China) CFMoto	Report
16	(Japan) Japanese motorcycle Grand Prix	(Spain) Iván Ortolá	(Colombia) David Alonso	(Colombia) David Alonso	(Spain) CFMoto Gaviota Aspar Team	(China) CFMoto	Report
17	(Australia) Australian motorcycle Grand Prix	(Spain) Iván Ortolá	(Italy) Stefano Nepa	(Colombia) David Alonso	(Spain) CFMoto Gaviota Aspar Team	(China) CFMoto	Report
18	Thailand motorcycle Grand Prix	(Australia) Joel Kelso	(Italy) Luca Lunetta	(Colombia) David Alonso	(Spain) CFMoto Gaviota Aspar Team	(China) CFMoto	Report
19	(Malaysia) Malaysian motorcycle Grand Prix	(Spain) Adrián Fernández	(Colombia) David Alonso	(Colombia) David Alonso	(Spain) CFMoto Gaviota Aspar Team	(China) CFMoto	Report
20	Solidarity motorcycle Grand Prix	(Colombia) David Alonso	(Spain) Daniel Holgado	(Colombia) David Alonso	(Spain) CFMoto Valresa Aspar Team	(China) CFMoto	Report

=== Riders' standings ===
Scoring system

Points were awarded to the top fifteen finishers. A rider had to finish the race to earn points.

Position	1st	2nd	3rd	4th	5th	6th	7th	8th	9th	10th	11th	12th	13th	14th	15th
Points	25	20	16	13	11	10	9	8	7	6	5	4	3	2	1

Pos.	Rider	Bike	Team	QAT (Qatar)	POR (Portugal)	AME (United States)	SPA (Spain)	FRA (France)	CAT (Catalonia)	ITA (Italy)	NED (Netherlands)	GER (Germany)	GBR (United Kingdom)	AUT (Austria)	ARA (Aragon)	RSM (San Marino)	EMI (Emilia-Romagna)	INA (Indonesia)	JPN (Japan)	AUS (Australia)	THA (Thailand)	MAL (Malaysia)	SLD	Pts
1	(Colombia) David Alonso	CFMoto	CFMoto Aspar Team	1	4^{F}	1^{P}	11^{P}	1^{P}	1	1^{P}	5	1	2	1	4^{P}	7^{P}	1	1	1^{F}	1	1	1^{F}	1^{P}	421
2	(Spain) Daniel Holgado	GasGas	Red Bull GasGas Tech3	2^{P}	1	2^{F}	7	2	6	14	11	7	4	3	9	2	4	6^{F}	4	2	12	Ret	2^{F}	256
3	(Netherlands) Collin Veijer	Husqvarna	Liqui Moly Husqvarna Intact GP	5	6	Ret	1	3	4	2^{F}	2	18^{P}	3	5	2	5	3^{F}	Ret	2	18	3	5	10	242
4	(Spain) Iván Ortolá	KTM	MT Helmets – MSi	9	3	Ret	3	5	2^{P}	6	1	3^{F}	1^{P}	9^{P}	12	3	5	9^{P}	16^{P}	Ret^{P}	4	4	9	224
5	(Spain) David Muñoz	KTM	Boé Motorsports	16	9	5	2	Ret	5	5	3	8	12	2	7	Ret	Ret	3	8	5	6	17	6	172
6	(Spain) Adrián Fernández	Honda	Leopard Racing	Ret	10	11	6	6	10	8	7^{F}	4	8^{F}	6	11	13	8	2	3	3	22	Ret^{P}	11	158
7	(Spain) José Antonio Rueda	KTM	Red Bull KTM Ajo	Ret	2^{P}	DNS	WD	8	3^{F}	15	4	Ret	9	7	1^{F}	Ret	10	11	5	9	16	3	4	157
8	(Spain) Ángel Piqueras	Honda	Leopard Racing	12	Ret	3	10	10	12	11	8^{P}	5	Ret	4	Ret	1^{F}	2	4	Ret	10	Ret	Ret	3	153
9	(Australia) Joel Kelso	KTM	Boé Motorsports	8	5	7	5	13	Ret	12	12	11	7	8	5	6	7	8	21	11	7^{P}	6	12	138
10	(Japan) Taiyo Furusato	Honda	Honda Team Asia	3	17	Ret	17	14	Ret	4	13	2		15	6	4	13^{P}	Ret	9	7	5	2	7	137
11	(Japan) Ryusei Yamanaka	KTM	MT Helmets – MSi	Ret	Ret	4	4^{F}	7	11	3	10	6	6	13	19	17	15	17	6	6	11	7	5	131
12	(Italy) Luca Lunetta	Honda	Sic58 Squadra Corse	15	22	19	20	11	7	7	6	Ret		17	3	9	6	5	Ret	8	2^{F}	10	18	112
13	(Italy) Stefano Nepa	KTM	LevelUp – MTA	6	7	18	9	17	13	Ret	9	12	5	Ret	13	14	14	15	10	4^{F}	9	8	Ret	93
14	(Japan) Tatsuki Suzuki	Husqvarna	Liqui Moly Husqvarna Intact GP	7^{F}	12	6	25	9	15	Ret	Ret	9	10	12^{F}	14	8	11	7	7	15	10	Ret	13	91
15	(Australia) Jacob Roulstone	GasGas	Red Bull GasGas Tech3	10	11	8	12	12	8	9	14	Ret	17	14	21	12	21	16	17	13	15	12	8	66
16	(Italy) Matteo Bertelle	Honda	Rivacold Snipers Team	Ret	DSQ	10	14	Ret	17	10	21	15	11	11	10	Ret	9	12	11	14	21	9	15	57
17	(Spain) Joel Esteban	CFMoto	CFMoto Aspar Team	11	8	9	Ret	4^{F}	14	18	15	14	13	25	15	22	20	14	15	16	Ret	Ret		45
18	(Italy) Riccardo Rossi	KTM	CIP Green Power	4	Ret	16	18	Ret	Ret	13	18	19	14	10	20	Ret	23	Ret	14	12	13	Ret	Ret	33
19	(Italy) Filippo Farioli	Honda	Sic58 Squadra Corse	Ret	16	15	13	Ret	9	19	22	13	16	26	Ret	10	12	Ret	13	Ret	14	13	20	32
20	(United Kingdom) Scott Ogden	Honda	MLav Racing	13	14	DSQ	19	Ret	16	17	17	10	Ret	19	16	15	18	13	19	22	8	Ret	17	23
21	(Italy) Nicola Carraro	KTM	LevelUp – MTA	14	15	12	8	19	18	16	16	17	15	16	DNS	16	16	10	Ret	Ret	19	Ret	16	22
22	(Spain) David Almansa	Honda	Rivacold Snipers Team	DNS		DNS	15	15	Ret	21	Ret	20	18	20	18	11	17	Ret	12	Ret	20	11	14	18
23	(Spain) Xabi Zurutuza	KTM	Red Bull KTM Ajo			13	22	16	19	Ret	19	16	Ret	18	8	18	19	Ret	18	17	18	14	22	13
24	(Spain) Vicente Pérez	KTM	Red Bull KTM Ajo	Ret	13		16																	3
24	(Spain) Vicente Pérez	Honda	MLav Racing										Ret	23	DNS	Ret	DNS							3
25	(Switzerland) Noah Dettwiler	KTM	CIP Green Power	17	19	14	21	18	21	20	23	23	20	24	17	20	22	18	Ret	21	23	18	23	2
26	(Thailand) Tatchakorn Buasri	Honda	Honda Team Asia	19	20	DNS	24	20	22	22	20	22	19	21	Ret	21	Ret	Ret	Ret	20	17	15	24	1
27	(United Kingdom) Eddie O'Shea	Honda	MLav Racing															DNS		19	Ret	16	21	0
28	(United Kingdom) Joshua Whatley	Honda	MLav Racing	18	18	17	23	21	20	23	24	21												0
29	(Austria) Jakob Rosenthaler	Husqvarna	Liqui Moly Husqvarna Intact GP											22		19								0
30	(Spain) Álvaro Carpe	KTM	Red Bull KTM Ajo																				19	0
31	(Japan) Rei Wakamatsu	Honda	MLav Racing																20					0
32	(Malaysia) Danial Shahril	Honda	Sic58 Squadra Corse										21											0
33	(Qatar) Hamad Al Sahouti	Honda	Rivacold Snipers Team		21																			0
34	(Indonesia) Fadillah Arbi Aditama	Honda	Astra Honda Team Asia						23						22			Ret						0
35	(Spain) Marcos Uriarte	CFMoto	CFMoto Aspar Team																				25	0
Pos.	Rider	Bike	Team	QAT (Qatar)	POR (Portugal)	AME (United States)	SPA (Spain)	FRA (France)	CAT (Catalonia)	ITA (Italy)	NED (Netherlands)	GER (Germany)	GBR (United Kingdom)	AUT (Austria)	ARA (Aragon)	RSM (San Marino)	EMI (Emilia-Romagna)	INA (Indonesia)	JPN (Japan)	AUS (Australia)	THA (Thailand)	MAL (Malaysia)	SLD	Pts

Race key
Colour	Result
Gold	Winner
Silver	2nd place
Bronze	3rd place
Green	Points finish
Blue	Non-points finish
Blue	Non-classified finish (NC)
Purple	Retired (Ret)
Red	Did not qualify (DNQ)
Black	Disqualified (DSQ)
White	Did not start (DNS)
White	Withdrew (WD)
White	Race cancelled (C)
Blank	Did not practice (DNP)
Blank	Excluded (EX)
Blank	Did not arrive (DNA)
Blank	Did not enter (empty cell)
Annotation	Meaning
P	Pole position
F	Fastest lap
Rider key
Colour	Meaning
Light blue	Rookie rider

=== Constructors' standings ===
Each constructor was awarded the same number of points as their best placed rider in each race.

Pos.	Constructor	QAT (Qatar)	POR (Portugal)	AME (United States)	SPA (Spain)	FRA (France)	CAT (Catalonia)	ITA (Italy)	NED (Netherlands)	GER (Germany)	GBR (United Kingdom)	AUT (Austria)	ARA (Aragon)	RSM (San Marino)	EMI (Emilia-Romagna)	INA (Indonesia)	JPN (Japan)	AUS (Australia)	THA (Thailand)	MAL (Malaysia)	SLD	Pts
1	(China) CFMoto	1	4	1	11	1	1	1	5	1	2	1	4	7	1	1	1	1	1	1	1	421
2	(Austria) KTM	4	3	4	2	5	2	3	1	3	1	2	1	3	5	3	5	4	4	3	4	333
3	(Japan) Honda	3	10	3	6	6	7	4	6	2	8	4	3	1	2	2	3	3	2	2	3	300
4	(Sweden) Husqvarna	5	6	6	1	3	4	2	2	9	3	5	2	5	3	7	2	15	3	5	10	269
5	(Spain) GasGas	2	1	2	7	2	9	9	11	7	4	3	9	2	4	6	4	2	12	12	2	265
Pos.	Constructor	QAT (Qatar)	POR (Portugal)	AME (United States)	SPA (Spain)	FRA (France)	CAT (Catalonia)	ITA (Italy)	NED (Netherlands)	GER (Germany)	GBR (United Kingdom)	AUT (Austria)	ARA (Aragon)	RSM (San Marino)	EMI (Emilia-Romagna)	INA (Indonesia)	JPN (Japan)	AUS (Australia)	THA (Thailand)	MAL (Malaysia)	SLD	Pts

=== Teams' standings ===
The teams' standings were based on results obtained by regular and substitute riders; wild-card entries were ineligible.

Pos.	Team	Bike No.	QAT (Qatar)	POR (Portugal)	AME (United States)	SPA (Spain)	FRA (France)	CAT (Catalonia)	ITA (Italy)	NED (Netherlands)	GER (Germany)	GBR (United Kingdom)	AUT (Austria)	ARA (Aragon)	RSM (San Marino)	EMI (Emilia-Romagna)	INA (Indonesia)	JPN (Japan)	AUS (Australia)	THA (Thailand)	MAL (Malaysia)	SLD	Pts
1	(Spain) CFMoto Aspar Team	78	11	8	9	Ret	4^{F}	11	18	15	14	13	25	15	22	20	14	15	16	Ret	Ret		466
1	(Spain) CFMoto Aspar Team	80	1	4^{F}	1^{P}	11^{P}	1^{P}	1	1^{P}	5	1	2	1	4^{P}	7^{P}	1	1	1^{F}	1	1	1^{F}	1^{P}	466
1	(Spain) CFMoto Aspar Team	89																				25	466
2	(Spain) MT Helmets - MSi	6	Ret	Ret	4	4^{F}	7	11	3	10	6	6	13	19	17	15	17	6	6	11	7	5	355
2	(Spain) MT Helmets - MSi	48	9	3	Ret	3	5	2^{P}	6	1	3^{F}	1^{P}	9^{P}	12	3	5	9^{P}	16^{P}	Ret^{P}	4	4	9	355
3	(Germany) Liqui Moly Husqvarna Intact GP	24	7^{F}	12	6	25	9	15	Ret	Ret	9	10	12^{F}	14	8	11	7	7	15	10	Ret	13	333
3	(Germany) Liqui Moly Husqvarna Intact GP	95	5	6	Ret	1	3	4	2^{F}	2	18^{P}	3	5	2	5	3^{F}	Ret	2	18	3	5	10	333
4	(France) Red Bull GasGas Tech3	12	10	11	8	12	12	8	9	14	Ret	17	14	21	12	21	16	17	13	15	12	8	322
4	(France) Red Bull GasGas Tech3	96	2^{P}	1	2^{F}	7	2	6	14	11	7	4	3	9	2	4	6^{F}	4	2	12	Ret	2^{F}	322
5	(Luxembourg) Leopard Racing	31	Ret	10	11	6	6	10	8	7^{F}	4	8^{F}	6	11	13	8	2	3	3	22	Ret^{P}	11	311
5	(Luxembourg) Leopard Racing	36	12	Ret	3	10	10	12	11	8^{P}	5	Ret	4	Ret	1^{F}	2	4	Ret	10	Ret	Ret	3	311
6	(Spain) Boé Motorsports	64	16	9	5	2	Ret	5	5	3	8	12	2	7	Ret	Ret	3	8	5	6	17	6	310
6	(Spain) Boé Motorsports	66	8	5	7	5	13	Ret	12	12	11	7	8	5	6	7	8	21	11	7^{P}	6	12	310
7	(Finland) Red Bull KTM Ajo	21	Ret	13		16																	173
7	(Finland) Red Bull KTM Ajo	85			13	22	16	19	Ret	19	16	Ret	18	8	18	19	Ret	18	17	18	14	22	173
7	(Finland) Red Bull KTM Ajo	99	Ret	2^{P}	DNS	WD	8	3^{F}	15	4	Ret	9	9	1^{F}	Ret	10	11	5	9	16	3	4	173
8	(Italy) Sic58 Squadra Corse	7	Ret	16	15	13	Ret	9	19	22	13	16	26	Ret	10	12	Ret	13	Ret	14	13	20	144
8	(Italy) Sic58 Squadra Corse	58	15	22	19	20	11	7	7	6	Ret		17	3	9	6	5	Ret	8	2^{F}	10	18	144
9	(Japan) Honda Team Asia	5	19	20	DNS	24	20	22	22	20	22	19	21	Ret	21	Ret	Ret	Ret	20	17	15	24	138
9	(Japan) Honda Team Asia	72	3	17	Ret	17	14	Ret	4	13	2		15	6	4	13^{P}	Ret	9	7	5	2	7	138
10	(Italy) LevelUp – MTA	10	14	15	12	8	19	18	16	16	17	15	16	DNS	16	16	10	Ret	Ret	19	Ret	16	115
10	(Italy) LevelUp – MTA	82	6	7	18	9	17	13	Ret	9	12	5	Ret	13	14	14	15	10	4^{F}	9	8	Ret	115
11	(Italy) Rivacold Snipers Team	18	Ret	DSQ	10	14	Ret	17	10	21	15	11	11	10	Ret	9	12	11	14	21	9	15	75
11	(Italy) Rivacold Snipers Team	22	DNS		DNS	15	15	Ret	21	Ret	20	18	20	18	11	17	Ret	12	Ret	20	11	14	75
11	(Italy) Rivacold Snipers Team	71		21																			75
12	(France) CIP Green Power	54	4	Ret	16	18	Ret	Ret	13	18	19	14	10	20	Ret	23	Ret	14	12	13	Ret	Ret	35
12	(France) CIP Green Power	55	17	19	14	21	18	21	20	23	23	20	24	17	20	22	18	Ret	21	23	18	23	35
13	(United Kingdom) MLav Racing	8															DNS		19	Ret	16	21	23
13	(United Kingdom) MLav Racing	19	13	14	DSQ	19	Ret	16	17	17	10	Ret	19	16	15	18	13	19	22	8	Ret	17	23
13	(United Kingdom) MLav Racing	21										Ret	23	DNS	Ret	Ret							23
13	(United Kingdom) MLav Racing	32																20					23
13	(United Kingdom) MLav Racing	70	18	18	17	23	21	20	23	24	21												23
Pos.	Team	Bike No.	QAT (Qatar)	POR (Portugal)	AME (United States)	SPA (Spain)	FRA (France)	CAT (Catalonia)	ITA (Italy)	NED (Netherlands)	GER (Germany)	GBR (United Kingdom)	AUT (Austria)	ARA (Aragon)	RSM (San Marino)	EMI (Emilia-Romagna)	INA (Indonesia)	JPN (Japan)	AUS (Australia)	THA (Thailand)	MAL (Malaysia)	SLD	Pts
