= Luca Lunetta =

Italian motorcycle racer (born 2006)

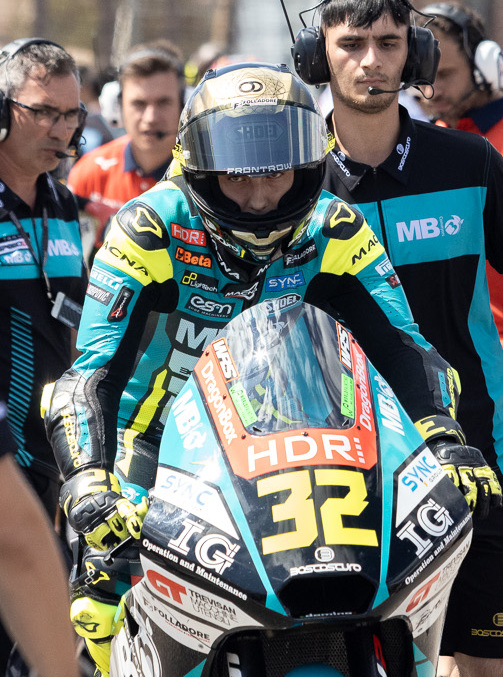
- Lunetta at the 2026 German Grand Prix
- Nationality: Italian
- Born: 27 May 2006 (age 20); Rome, Italy
- Current team: SpeedRS Team
- Bike number: 32
Motorcycle racing career statistics
Moto2 World Championship
| Active years | 2026– |
| Manufacturers | Boscoscuro (2026) |
Starts / Wins / Podiums / Poles / F. laps / Points; 17 / 0 / 0 / 0 / 0 / 27
Moto3 World Championship
| Active years | 2022–2025 |
| Manufacturers | KTM (2022–2023); Honda (2024–2025) |
| Championships | 0 |
| 2025 championship position | 12th (125 pts) |
Starts / Wins / Podiums / Poles / F. laps / Points; 39 / 0 / 4 / 0 / 2 / 237

Luca Lunetta (born 27 May 2006) is an Italian Grand Prix motorcycle racer who competes in the 2026 Moto2 World Championship for SpeedRS Team. He has previously raced in the Moto3 World Championship in 2024 and 2025.

== Career ==
=== Early career ===
Lunetta was born in Rome, Italy, and started riding minibikes at the age of five. Since he was young, he has used Marco Simoncelli's number 58 as a tribute, and has expressed how he sees him as an inspiration and reference. He has won various Italian and European Pocketbike championships.

After winning the CIV PreMoto3 250 Championship in 2019, in 2020, at the age of 14, Lunetta joined the Red Bull MotoGP Rookies Cup and participated in ten out of twelve total races, scoring points in three occasions.

In 2021, Lunetta participated in his second Red Bull MotoGP Rookies Cup season and finished 13th overall. He also took part in the FIM CEV Moto3 Junior World Championship where he finished 16th.

In 2022, Lunetta completed his last Red Bull MotoGP Rookies Cup season earning one win and four podiums. Meanwhile, he finished 11th in the Junior GP. He also made his Moto3 World Championship debut, replacing an injured Matteo Bertelle in the Dutch TT, and finished 19th.

In his last year before his first full-time season in Moto3, Lunetta finished as championship runner-up in the 2023 Junior GP season behind Ángel Piqueras. He also participated in the Moto3 Italian Grand Prix, making his second World Championship appearance.

=== Moto3 World Championship ===
==== Sic58 Squadra Corse (2024–2025) ====
On 10 August 2023, it was announced that Lunetta would be joining the Moto3 World Championship for the 2024 season, pairing with compatriot Filippo Farioli.

Lunetta had a strong 2024 season as a rookie, he scored a total of two podiums, a third position in Aragón and a second position in Thailand. He came 12th in the final standings, and was beaten to the rookie of the year award by Ángel Piqueras.

=== Moto2 World Championship ===
==== Speed Up Racing (2026) ====
On 6 September 2025, ahead of the Catalan Grand Prix, Speed Up Racing announced Lunetta would be stepping up to the Moto2 World Championship to race alongside Celestino Vietti.

== Career statistics ==
=== Career highlights ===
- 2019: 1st, CIV PreMoto3 250 Championship

=== Red Bull MotoGP Rookies Cup ===
==== Races by year ====
(key) (Races in bold indicate pole position; races in italics indicate fastest lap)

| Year | Bike | 1 | | 2 | | 3 | | 4 | | 5 | | 6 | | 7 | | Pos | Pts |
| Year | Bike | R1 | R2 | R1 | R2 | R1 | R2 | R1 | R2 | R1 | R2 | R1 | R2 | R1 | R2 | Pos | Pts |
|---|---|---|---|---|---|---|---|---|---|---|---|---|---|---|---|---|---|
| 2020 | KTM | RBR; Ret | RBR; 18 | RBR; Ret | RBR; 15 | ARA; 19 | ARA; 18 | ARA; 16 | ARA; 19 | VAL; 12 | VAL; 15 | VAL | VAL | | | 23rd | 6 |
| 2021 | KTM | POR; 16 | POR; Ret | JER; 14 | JER; 19 | MUG; 16 | MUG; 10 | SAC; 8 | SAC; 6 | RBR; 11 | RBR; 10 | RBR; 13 | RBR; 14 | ARA; 9 | ARA; 8 | 13th | 57 |
| 2022 | KTM | POR; Ret | POR; 10 | JER; 8 | JER; 2 | MUG; 8 | MUG; 5 | SAC; 3 | SAC; 8 | RBR; 5 | RBR; 8 | ARA; Ret | ARA; 4 | VAL; 1 | VAL; 3 | 5th | 150 |

=== FIM CEV Moto3 Junior World Championship ===
==== Races by year ====
(key) (Races in bold indicate pole position; races in italics indicate fastest lap)

| Year | Bike | 1 | 2 | 3 | 4 | 5 | 6 | 7 | 8 | 9 | 10 | 11 | 12 | Pos | Pts |
|---|---|---|---|---|---|---|---|---|---|---|---|---|---|---|---|
| 2021 | KTM | EST; 24 | VAL1; Ret | VAL2; 14 | | | | | | | | | | 16th | 37 |
| 2021 | Husqvarna | | | | CAT1; 13 | CAT2; Ret | POR; 15 | ARA; 13 | JER1; 13 | JER2; 11 | RSM; 6 | VAL1; 11 | VAL2; 11 | 16th | 37 |

=== FIM JuniorGP World Championship ===
==== Races by year ====
(key) (Races in bold indicate pole position; races in italics indicate fastest lap)

| Year | Bike | 1 | 2 | 3 | 4 | 5 | 6 | 7 | 8 | 9 | 10 | 11 | 12 | Pos | Pts |
|---|---|---|---|---|---|---|---|---|---|---|---|---|---|---|---|
| 2022 | Husqvarna | EST; 13 | VAL1; Ret | VAL2; 6 | CAT1; 25 | CAT2; Ret | JER1; 12 | JER2; 6 | POR; 7 | RSM; 5 | ARA; 5 | VAL1; 5 | VAL2; 6 | 11th | 79 |
| 2023 | KTM | **EST**; 4 | VAL1; 3 | VAL2; 4 | JER1; 4 | JER2; 21 | **POR1**; 3 | **POR2**; 13 | CAT1; 11 | CAT2; 4 | ARA; 2 | VAL1; 6 | VAL2; 3 | 2nd | 138 |

=== FIM Moto2 European Championship ===
==== Races by year ====
(key) (Races in bold indicate pole position, races in italics indicate fastest lap)

| Year | Bike | 1 | 2 | 3 | 4 | 5 | 6 | 7 | 8 | 9 | 10 | 11 | Pos | Pts |
|---|---|---|---|---|---|---|---|---|---|---|---|---|---|---|
| 2025 | Boscoscuro | EST1 | EST2 | JER | MAG1 | MAG2 | ARA1 | ARA2 | MIS | CAT1 | CAT2 | VAL; DNS | NC | 0 |

=== Grand Prix motorcycle racing ===
==== By season ====
| Season | Class | Motorcycle | Team | Race | Win | Podium | Pole | FLap | Pts | Plcd |
|---|---|---|---|---|---|---|---|---|---|---|
| 2022 | Moto3 | KTM | QJmotor Avintia Racing Team | 1 | 0 | 0 | 0 | 0 | 0 | 35th |
| 2023 | Moto3 | KTM | MT Helmets – MSi | 1 | 0 | 0 | 0 | 0 | 0 | 36th |
| 2024 | Moto3 | Honda | Sic58 Squadra Corse | 19 | 0 | 2 | 0 | 1 | 112 | 12th |
| 2025 | Moto3 | Honda | Sic58 Squadra Corse | 18 | 0 | 2 | 0 | 1 | 125 | 12th |
| 2026 | Moto2 | Boscoscuro | SpeedRS Team | 17 | 0 | 0 | 0 | 0 | 27* | 19th* |
| Total | | | | **56** | **0** | **4** | **0** | **2** | **264** | |

==== By class ====
| Class | Seasons | 1st GP | 1st pod | 1st win | Race | Win | Podiums | Pole | FLap | Pts | WChmp |
|---|---|---|---|---|---|---|---|---|---|---|---|
| Moto3 | 2022–2025 | 2022 Assen | 2024 Aragón | | 39 | 0 | 4 | 0 | 2 | 237 | 0 |
| Moto2 | 2026–present | 2026 Thailand | | | 17 | 0 | 0 | 0 | 0 | 27 | 0 |
| Total | 2022–present | | | | **56** | **0** | **4** | **0** | **2** | **264** | **0** |

==== Races by year ====
(key) (Races in bold indicate pole position; races in italics indicate fastest lap)

| Year | Class | Bike | 1 | 2 | 3 | 4 | 5 | 6 | 7 | 8 | 9 | 10 | 11 | 12 | 13 | 14 | 15 | 16 | 17 | 18 | 19 | 20 | 21 | 22 | Pos | Pts |
|---|---|---|---|---|---|---|---|---|---|---|---|---|---|---|---|---|---|---|---|---|---|---|---|---|---|---|
| 2022 | Moto3 | KTM | QAT | INA | ARG | AME | POR | SPA | FRA | ITA | CAT | GER | NED; 19 | GBR | AUT | RSM | ARA | JPN | THA | AUS | MAL | VAL | | | 35th | 0 |
| 2023 | Moto3 | KTM | POR | ARG | AME | SPA | FRA | ITA; 19 | GER | NED | GBR | AUT | CAT | RSM | IND | JPN | INA | AUS | THA | MAL | QAT | VAL | | | 36th | 0 |
| 2024 | Moto3 | Honda | QAT; 15 | POR; 22 | AME; 19 | SPA; 20 | FRA; 11 | CAT; 7 | ITA; 7 | NED; 6 | GER; Ret | GBR | AUT; 17 | ARA; 3 | RSM; 9 | EMI; 6 | INA; 5 | JPN; Ret | AUS; 8 | THA; 2 | MAL; 10 | SLD; 18 | | | 12th | 112 |
| 2025 | Moto3 | Honda | THA; 10 | ARG; 7 | AME; Ret | QAT; 7 | SPA; 11 | FRA; 9 | GBR; 3 | ARA; 5 | ITA; Ret | NED; Ret | GER | CZE | AUT | HUN | CAT; 11 | RSM; Ret | JPN; 9 | INA; 2 | AUS; 7 | MAL; 10 | POR; 10 | VAL; 7 | 12th | 125 |
| 2026 | Moto2 | Boscoscuro | THA; Ret | BRA | USA | SPA; 18 | FRA; 16 | CAT; 9 | ITA; 16 | HUN; 18 | CZE; 20 | NED; 12 | GER; 10 | GBR; 16 | ARA; 18 | RSM; 23 | AUT; 10 | JPN; 21 | INA; 12 | AUS; C | MAL; Ret | QAT; 16 | POR | VAL | 19th* | 27* |

* Season still in progress.
