= 2022 FIM JuniorGP World Championship =

Junior Motorcycle World Championship

2022 FIM JuniorGP World Championship
| Previous: | 2021 | Next: | 2023 |
Support series: FIM Moto2 European Championship; European Talent Cup

The 2022 FIM JuniorGP World Championship was the eleventh season of former CEV Moto3 and the ninth edition under the FIM.

The championship had a name change enhancing JuniorGP leaving the historical connection to CEV. The season started on 8 May at Estoril Circuit, Portugal.

== Calendar ==
The calendar was published in November 2021. The Jerez and second Valencia rounds were advanced to July and October.

| Round | Date | Circuit | Pole position | Fastest lap | Race winner | Winning constructor |
|---|---|---|---|---|---|---|
| 1 | 8 May | (Portugal) Estoril | (Spain) José Antonio Rueda | (Spain) Adrián Cruces | (Thailand) Tatchakorn Buasri | (Japan) Honda |
| 2 | 22 May | (Spain) Valencia | (Spain) José Antonio Rueda | (Spain) Ángel Piqueras | (Colombia) David Alonso | (Spain) Gas Gas |
| 2 | 22 May | (Spain) Valencia | (Spain) José Antonio Rueda | (Colombia) David Alonso | (Spain) José Antonio Rueda | (Japan) Honda |
| 3 | 12 June | (Spain) Barcelona | (Spain) José Antonio Rueda | (Spain) José Antonio Rueda | (Spain) José Antonio Rueda | (Japan) Honda |
| 3 | 12 June | (Spain) Barcelona | (Spain) José Antonio Rueda | (Italy) Filippo Farioli | (Spain) José Antonio Rueda | (Japan) Honda |
| 4 | 3 July | (Spain) Jerez | (Netherlands) Collin Veijer | (Spain) Ángel Piqueras | (Netherlands) Collin Veijer | (Austria) KTM |
| 4 | 3 July | (Spain) Jerez | (Netherlands) Collin Veijer | (Spain) Adrián Cruces | (Spain) José Antonio Rueda | (Japan) Honda |
| 5 | 17 July | (Portugal) Portimão | (Spain) Adrián Cruces | (Malaysia) Syarifuddin Azman | (Spain) José Antonio Rueda | (Japan) Honda |
| 6 | 3 September | San Marino | (Spain) David Salvador | (Spain) Ángel Piqueras | (Italy) Filippo Farioli | (Spain) Gas Gas |
| 7 | 9 October | (Spain) Aragón | (Netherlands) Collin Veijer | (Italy) Filippo Farioli | (Netherlands) Collin Veijer | (Austria) KTM |
| 8 | 30 October | (Spain) Valencia | (Netherlands) Collin Veijer | (Italy) Filippo Farioli | (Spain) David Salvador | (Sweden) Husqvarna |
| 8 | 30 October | (Spain) Valencia | (Netherlands) Collin Veijer | (Italy) Filippo Farioli | (Spain) David Almansa | (Austria) KTM |

== Entry list ==
| Team | Constructor | No. | Rider | Rounds |
|---|---|---|---|---|
| (Spain) Aspar Junior Team | GasGas | 7 | (Italy) Filippo Farioli | All |
| (Spain) Aspar Junior Team | GasGas | 12 | (Australia) Jacob Roulstone | All |
| (Spain) Aspar Junior Team | GasGas | 80 | (Colombia) David Alonso | All |
| (Fédération Internationale de Motocyclisme) Cross & Road Racing Team (Note: Cross & Road Racing Team is a Russian team, but competes as a neutral competitor using the Fédération Internationale de Motocyclisme flag as Belarusian and Russian national emblems were banned by the association due to the Russian invasion of Ukraine.) | KTM | 10 | (Italy) Nicola Carraro | 2–5 |
| (Spain) Cuna de Campeones | KTM | 11 | (Spain) Adrián Cruces | 1–7 |
| (Spain) Cuna de Campeones | KTM | 55 | (Switzerland) Noah Dettwiller | All |
| (Spain) BOE SKX Cardoso Racing | KTM | 17 | (Spain) Daniel Muñoz | 1–4 |
| (Spain) BOE SKX Cardoso Racing | KTM | 97 | (Argentina) Marco Morelli | |
| (Spain) Team Estrella Galicia 0,0 | Honda | 18 | (Spain) Ángel Piqueras | All |
| (Spain) Team Estrella Galicia 0,0 | Honda | 94 | (Uruguay) Facundo Llambías | 1–3, 5–8 |
| (Spain) Team Estrella Galicia 0,0 | Honda | 99 | (Spain) José Antonio Rueda | All |
| (Italy) AC Racing Team | KTM Husqvarna | 19 | (Italy) Alessandro Morosi | All |
| (Italy) AC Racing Team | KTM Husqvarna | 58 | (Italy) Luca Lunetta | All |
| (Spain) Finetwork MIR Racing Team | KTM Mir Racing | 22 | (Spain) David García | |
| (Spain) Finetwork MIR Racing Team | KTM Mir Racing | 69 | (Spain) Marcos Ruda | All |
| (Italy) SIC58 Squadra Corse | Honda | 29 | (Australia) Harrison Voight | 1, 3–5, 7–8 |
| (United Kingdom) British Talent Team | Honda | 31 | (United Kingdom) Eddie O'Shea | 1–5, 7 |
| (Japan) Asia Talent Team | Honda | 32 | (Malaysia) Danial Sharil | All |
| Honda Racing Thailand | Honda | 33 | (Thailand) Tatchakorn Buasri | All |
| (Indonesia) Astra Honda Racing Team | Honda | 34 | (Indonesia) Fadillah Arbi Aditama | All |
| (Spain) Laglisse Academy | Husqvarna | 38 | (Spain) David Salvador | All |
| (Spain) Laglisse Academy | Husqvarna | 89 | (Spain) Marcos Uriarte | 1–2 |
| (Spain) Artbox | Honda | 42 | (Hungary) Soma Görbe | All |
| (Spain) Igaxteam | KTM | 43 | (France) Antoine Bonnard | |
| (Malaysia) SIC Racing | Honda | 63 | (Malaysia) Syarifuddin Azman | All |
| (Germany) Liqui Moly Intact Junior GP Team | KTM | 66 | (Germany) Philipp Tonn | All |
| (Germany) Liqui Moly Intact Junior GP Team | KTM | 78 | (Austria) Jakob Rosenthaler | All |
| (Spain) AGR Team | KTM | 71 | (Canada) Torin Collins | All |
| (Spain) AGR Team | KTM | 77 | (Italy) Mattia Volpi | 1–4 |
| (Spain) AGR Team | KTM | 95 | (Netherlands) Collin Veijer | All |
| (Spain) FAU55 Tey Racing | KTM | 72 | (Japan) Kanta Hamada | All |
| (Luxembourg) Leopard Impala Junior Team | Honda | 74 | (France) Alex Gourdon | All |
| (Luxembourg) Leopard Impala Junior Team | Honda | 84 | (France) Théo Gourdon | 1–7 |
| (Spain) STV-MT Helmets-MSI | KTM | 83 | (Spain) Álvaro Carpe | 3–8 |
| (Spain) Angeluss MTA Team | KTM | 85 | (Spain) Xabi Zurutuza | All |
| (Spain) Angeluss MTA Team | KTM | 91 | (Japan) Kotaro Uchuimi | All |
Entry lists:

== Riders' Championship standings ==
Points were awarded to the top fifteen riders, provided the rider finished the race.

| Position | 1st | 2nd | 3rd | 4th | 5th | 6th | 7th | 8th | 9th | 10th | 11th | 12th | 13th | 14th | 15th |
| Points | 25 | 20 | 16 | 13 | 11 | 10 | 9 | 8 | 7 | 6 | 5 | 4 | 3 | 2 | 1 |

| Pos. | Rider | Bike | EST (Portugal) | VAL (Spain) | | BAR (Spain) | | JER (Spain) | | ALG (Portugal) | SMR (San Marino) | ARA (Spain) | VAL (Spain) | | Pts |
|---|---|---|---|---|---|---|---|---|---|---|---|---|---|---|---|
| 1 | (Spain) José Antonio Rueda | Honda | 2^{P} | 4^{P} | 1^{P} | 1^{PF} | 1^{P} | 2 | 1 | 1 | 2 | 3 | 4 | 5 | 238 |
| 2 | (Spain) David Salvador | Husqvarna | 3 | 3 | 3 | 5 | 6 | Ret | 4 | 4 | 4^{P} | 2 | 1 | 7 | 162 |
| 3 | (Italy) Filippo Farioli | Gas Gas | 8 | Ret | 2 | 3 | 3^{F} | 5 | 7 | 24 | 1 | 8^{F} | 3^{F} | 2^{F} | 149 |
| 4 | (Malaysia) Syarifuddin Azman | Honda | Ret | 7 | 4 | 2 | 2 | 4 | 14 | 2^{F} | 6 | 13 | Ret | 9 | 117 |
| 5 | (Spain) Ángel Piqueras | Honda | Ret | 2^{F} | 5 | 4 | 4 | 3^{F} | 8 | Ret | 3^{F} | WD | Ret | 8 | 105 |
| 6 | (Netherlands) Collin Veijer | KTM | DNS | 14 | Ret | 7 | Ret | 1^{P} | 11^{P} | 9 | Ret | 1^{P} | 2^{P} | 23^{P} | 93 |
| 7 | (Colombia) David Alonso | Gas Gas | 4 | 1 | 7^{F} | 11 | 7 | 7 | 13 | Ret | Ret | 4 | Ret | DNS | 86 |
| 8 | (Spain) David Almansa | KTM | Ret | Ret | 10 | 9 | 5 | 11 | 2 | 5 | DNS | 17 | Ret | 1 | 85 |
| 9 | (Thailand) Tatchakorn Buasri | Honda | 1 | 5 | Ret | 13 | 14 | 13 | 5 | 6 | 8 | 12 | 12 | 12 | 85 |
| 10 | (Spain) Adrián Cruces | KTM | 5^{F} | 6 | 8 | 8 | 19 | 8 | Ret^{F} | 3^{P} | 7 | 6 | | | 80 |
| 11 | (Italy) Luca Lunetta | Husqvarna | 13 | Ret | 6 | 25 | Ret | 12 | 6 | 7 | 5 | 5 | 5 | 6 | 79 |
| 12 | (Australia) Harrison Voight | Honda | Ret | | | 6 | 8 | 6 | 9 | Ret | | Ret | 6 | 4 | 58 |
| 13 | (United Kingdom) Eddie O'Shea | Honda | 9 | Ret | 12 | 16 | Ret | 15 | 3 | 8 | | DNS | | | 36 |
| 14 | (Spain) Marcos Ruda | KTM | 15 | 8 | 13 | 18 | 13 | 17 | Ret | 11 | 12 | 10 | 10 | Ret | 36 |
| 15 | (Spain) Alberto Ferrández | KTM | | | | | | | | | 9 | 15 | 7 | 3 | 33 |
| 16 | (Uruguay) Facundo Llambías | Honda | 6 | 9 | Ret | DNS | DNS | | | 20 | 11 | 7 | 19 | Ret | 31 |
| 17 | (Malaysia) Danial Shahril | Honda | 12 | 13 | 14 | 14 | Ret | Ret | 10 | 18 | 13 | Ret | 8 | 14 | 30 |
| 18 | (Spain) Xabi Zurutuza | KTM | 10 | 12 | 9 | 15 | 9 | 14 | 15 | 16 | Ret | 20 | 20 | 22 | 28 |
| 19 | (Italy) Nicola Carraro | KTM | | Ret | 18 | 10 | 11 | 9 | 12 | 10 | | | | | 28 |
| 20 | (Switzerland) Noah Dettwiller | KTM | 14 | 19 | 16 | 22 | 15 | 10 | Ret | 12 | Ret | 22 | 9 | 13 | 23 |
| 21 | (Spain) Daniel Muñoz | KTM | 7 | 17 | 11 | 12 | Ret | WD | WD | | | | | | 18 |
| 22 | (Indonesia) Fadillah Arbi Aditama | Honda | 17 | 16 | 15 | 28 | Ret | 16 | Ret | 13 | 15 | 11 | 14 | 10 | 18 |
| 23 | (Italy) Alessandro Morosi | Husqvarna | 16 | 11 | 20 | 17 | 10 | 23 | Ret | 14 | 14 | 21 | Ret | 24 | 15 |
| 24 | (New Zealand) Cormac Buchanan | KTM | | | | | | | | 19 | 21 | 9 | 11 | 17 | 12 |
| 25 | (Australia) Jacob Roulstone | Gas Gas | 21 | 18 | 23 | 26 | 16 | 21 | Ret | 17 | 19 | 14 | 13 | 11 | 10 |
| 26 | (Austria) Jakob Rosenthaler | KTM | 20 | 20 | Ret | 24 | 20 | 20 | 18 | 15 | 10 | 19 | Ret | 15 | 8 |
| 27 | (Spain) Marcos Uriarte | Husqvarna | Ret | 10 | Ret | | | | | | | | | | 6 |
| 28 | (Hungary) Soma Görbe | Honda | 11 | 15 | Ret | 20 | Ret | Ret | Ret | DNS | 18 | Ret | Ret | 19 | 6 |
| 29 | (Japan) Kanta Hamada | KTM | Ret | Ret | 19 | 19 | 12 | Ret | 17 | 22 | 16 | 25 | 18 | 18 | 4 |
| 30 | (Germany) Philipp Tonn | KTM | 18 | Ret | 22 | Ret | 17 | 18 | 19 | DNS | Ret | 18 | 15 | Ret | 1 |
| | (Spain) Álvaro Carpe | KTM | | | | 23 | 18 | 19 | 16 | Ret | DNS | 16 | 16 | 16 | 0 |
| | (Canada) Torin Collins | KTM | 24 | 22 | Ret | 21 | 21 | 22 | 21 | 21 | 22 | 23 | 17 | 20 | 0 |
| | (Italy) Mattia Volpi | KTM | 23 | Ret | 17 | Ret | Ret | 24 | 22 | | | | | | 0 |
| | (Italy) Cesare Tiezzi | KTM | | | | | | | | | 17 | | | | 0 |
| | (Japan) Kotaro Uchuimi | KTM | 19 | 23 | 21 | 27 | 22 | Ret | 20 | WD | 20 | 24 | DNS | 21 | 0 |
| | (France) Alex Gourdon | Honda | Ret | 21 | Ret | 29 | 24 | Ret | DNS | 23 | 23 | Ret | 21 | 25 | 0 |
| | (Italy) Pasquale Alfano | KTM | 22 | 24 | Ret | DNS | DNS | | | | | | | | 0 |
| | (United Kingdom) Ben Austin | Husqvarna | | | | DNQ | DNQ | Ret | 23 | 25 | 26 | | | | 0 |
| | (France) Théo Gourdon | Honda | DNQ | DNS | DNS | 30 | 23 | 25 | Ret | DNS | 27 | WD | | | 0 |
| | (Qatar) Hamad Al Sahouti | Honda | | | | | | | | | 23 | | | | 0 |
| | (Republic of Ireland) Casey O'Gorman | KTM | | | | | | | | | 24 | | | | 0 |
| | (Italy) Alessio Mattei | KTM | | | | | | | | | | | Ret | 26 | 0 |
| Pos. | Rider | Bike | EST (Portugal) | VAL (Spain) | | BAR (Spain) | | JER (Spain) | | ALG (Portugal) | SMR (San Marino) | ARA (Spain) | VAL (Spain) | | Pts |
