= Collin Veijer =

Dutch motorcycle racer (born 2005)

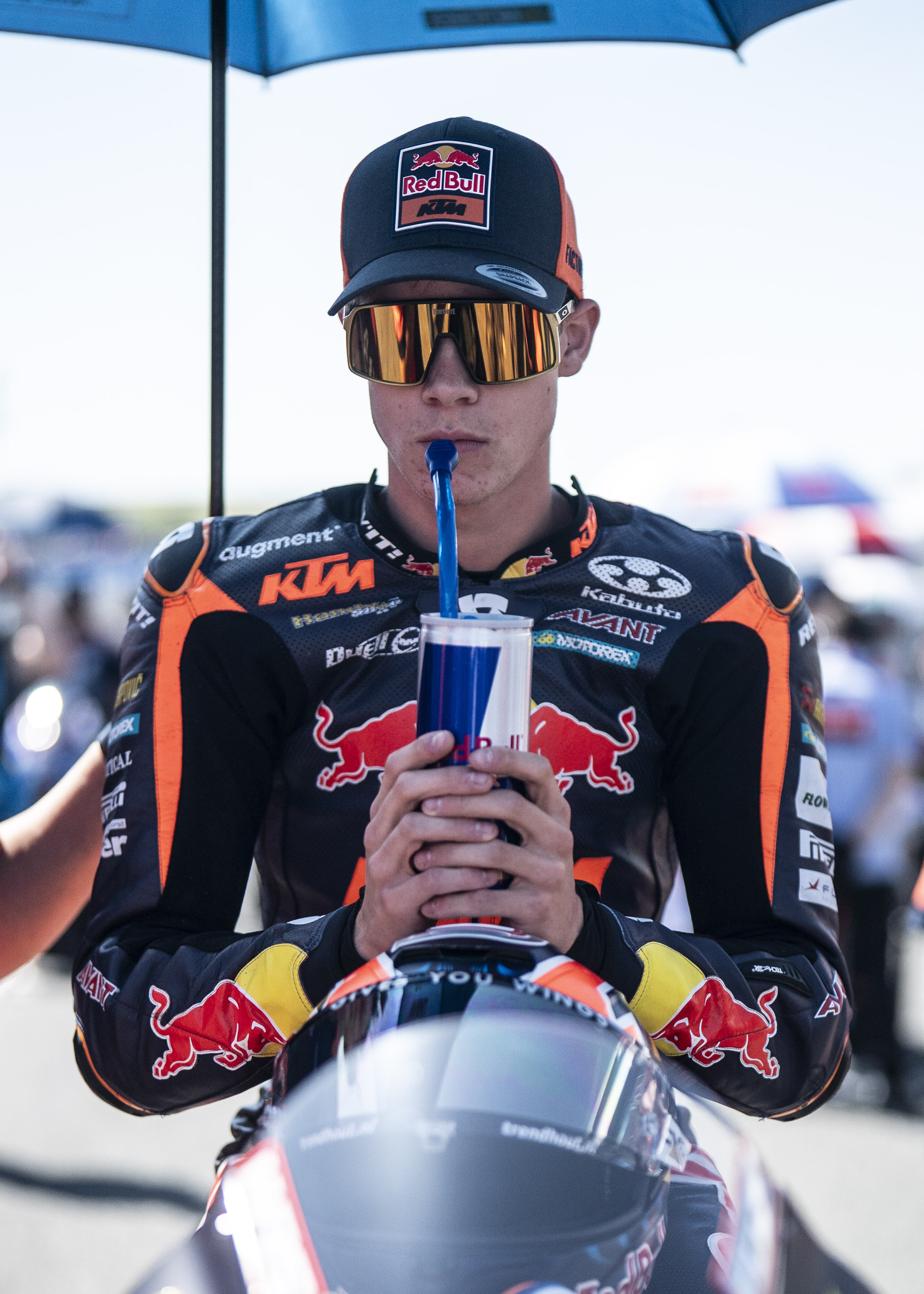
- Veijer at the 2025 Spanish Grand Prix
- Nationality: Dutch
- Born: 19 February 2005 (age 21); Staphorst, Netherlands
- Current team: Red Bull KTM Ajo
- Bike number: 95
- Website: collinveijer.com
Motorcycle racing career statistics
Moto2 World Championship
Active years	2025–
Manufacturers	Kalex
2025 championship position	15th (97 pts)
Starts / Wins / Podiums / Poles / F. laps / Points; 37 / 0 / 3 / 1 / 1 / 186.5
Moto3 World Championship
Active years	2023–2024
Manufacturers	Husqvarna
Championships	0
2024 championship position	3rd (242 pts)
Starts / Wins / Podiums / Poles / F. laps / Points; 39 / 2 / 11 / 3 / 3 / 391

Collin Veijer (born 19 February 2005) is a Dutch Grand Prix motorcycle racer who competes in the Moto2 World Championship for Red Bull KTM Ajo, having raced for the same team in 2025.

Veijer has previously raced in the Moto3 World Championship in 2023 and 2024, and is a double Grand Prix winner of the same category.

== Career ==
=== Early career ===
Veijer was born in Staphorst, Netherlands, and started riding minibikes from a young age, winning the Dutch Minibike Championship at the age of eight. He was selected to compete in the Red Bull MotoGP Rookies Cup in 2020, and finished tenth in the overall standings in his debut season. He also participated in the European Talent Cup where he finished 16th overall, with two top-ten finishes.

In 2021, Veijer faced his second Red Bull MotoGP Rookies Cup season, and finished 12th, after missing two races at the Red Bull Ring round. That same year, he also competed in the FIM CEV Moto3 Junior World Championship, where he finished 15th.

Veijer finished as runner-up in his final 2022 Red Bull MotoGP Rookies Cup season in 2022, with a total of three wins and six podiums. He also competed in the FIM JuniorGP World Championship, where he clinched two victories and a total of three podiums.

=== Moto3 World Championship ===
==== Liqui Moly Husqvarna Intact GP (2023–2024) ====
In 2023, Veijer joined the Moto3 World Championship with Liqui Moly Husqvarna Intact GP alongside Ayumu Sasaki. He started the season with consistent performances, making his way into the points on several occasions. In only his tenth race, in Austria, Veijer started from pole for the first time and went on to finish fourth. He earned his maiden podium in Thailand after two consecutive fourth positions in Indonesia and Australia. He would then secure his first Moto3 win in Malaysia in front of teammate Sasaki and championship rival Masià. He came seventh in the championship standings, with a total of 149 points, being beaten to the Rookie of the Year award by David Alonso.

Veijer stayed with Intact GP for the 2024 season, teaming up with Tatsuki Suzuki. He earned his second career win in Jerez, followed by a third position in Le Mans. Veijer finished in second place in his home race in Assen after a last corner overtake by Iván Ortolá. He started from pole for the second time in his career in the German Grand Prix, but crashed on lap two while leading the race and finished the eighteenth after picking up his Husqvarna. Veijer earned several podiums throughout the rest of the season, and finished third in the championship standings behind David Alonso and Daniel Holgado.

=== Moto2 World Championship ===
==== Red Bull KTM Ajo (2025–) ====
Veijer at the 2026 Czech Grand Prix

On 13 August 2024, it was announced that Veijer would be moving up to the Moto2 class with Red Bull KTM Ajo for the 2025 season, alongside Deniz Öncü. Veijer's rookie year saw a gradual improvement as the season progressed. He finished in tenth place in the third round at COTA, which was followed by two point-scoring finishes at Qatar and Jerez. Veijer suffered an injury to his right arm after a training accident, ahead of the British Grand Prix, for which he underwent surgery, and consequently missed the two following rounds. Veijer secured multiple top-ten finishes during the second half of the season—including a maiden podium at Portimão—where he finished in second place less than one tenth behind Diogo Moreira. He ended the season 15th in the standings.

In September 2025, Red Bull KTM Ajo confirmed Veijer's renewal for a second season in 2026, with José Antonio Rueda alongside him. He remains with the team for a third consecutive season in 2027.

== Career statistics ==
=== European Talent Cup ===
==== Races by year ====
(key) (Races in bold indicate pole position; races in italics indicate fastest lap)

Year	Bike	1	2	3	4	5	6	7	8	9	10	11	Pos	Pts
2020	Honda	EST; Ret	EST; Ret	ALG; 13	JER; 12	JER; 13	JER; 10	ARA; 13	ARA; 17	ARA; 14	VAL; 9	VAL; 31	16th	28

=== Red Bull MotoGP Rookies Cup ===
==== Races by year ====
(key) (Races in bold indicate pole position; races in italics indicate fastest lap)

Year	Bike	1		2		3		4		5		6		7		Pos	Pts
Year	Bike	R1	R2	R1	R2	R1	R2	R1	R2	R1	R2	R1	R2	R1	R2	Pos	Pts
2020	KTM	RBR1; 14	RBR1; 10	RBR2; 10	RBR2; 7	ARA1; Ret	ARA1; 9	ARA2; Ret	ARA2; 7	VAL1; Ret	VAL1; 8	VAL2; 6	VAL2; 6			10th	67
2021	KTM	POR1; 10	POR2; 7	JER1; 10	JER2; Ret	MUG1; 11	MUG2; 7	SAC1; Ret	SAC2; 11	RBR1	RBR2	RBR3; 11	RBR4; 8	ARA1; 12	ARA2; 11	12th	62
2022	KTM	POR1; 3	POR2; 1	JER1; 3	JER2; 4	MUG1; 15	MUG2; 1	SAC1; 4	SAC2; 2	RBR1; 4	RBR2; 5	ARA1; 4	ARA2; 1	VAL1; 7	VAL2; 6	2nd	210

=== FIM JuniorGP World Championship ===
==== Races by year ====
(key) (Races in bold indicate pole position; races in italics indicate fastest lap)

Year	Bike	1	2	3	4	5	6	7	8	9	10	11	12	Pos	Pts
2021	KTM	EST; 12	VAL1; 7	VAL2; 11										15th	44
2021	Husqvarna				CAT1; Ret	CAT2; Ret	POR; 17	ARA; 26	JER1; 15	JER2; 14	RSM; 4	VAL1; 12	VAL2; 10	15th	44
2022	KTM	EST; DNS	VAL1; 14	VAL2; Ret	CAT1; 7	CAT2; Ret	**JER1**; 1	**JER2**; 11	POR; 9	RSM; Ret	**ARA**; 1	**VAL1**; 2	**VAL2**; 23	6th	93

=== Grand Prix motorcycle racing ===
==== By season ====
Season	Class	Motorcycle	Team	Race	Win	Podium	Pole	FLap	Pts	Plcd
2023	Moto3	Husqvarna	Liqui Moly Husqvarna Intact GP	19	1	2	2	1	149	7th
2024	Moto3	Husqvarna	Liqui Moly Husqvarna Intact GP	20	1	9	1	2	242	**3rd**
2025	Moto2	Kalex	Red Bull KTM Ajo	20	0	1	0	1	97	15th
2026	Moto2	Kalex	Red Bull KTM Ajo	17	0	2	1	0	89.5*	11th*
Total				**76**	**2**	**14**	**4**	**4**	**577.5**	

==== By class ====
Class	Seasons	1st GP	1st pod	1st win	Race	Win	Podiums	Pole	FLap	Pts	WChmp
Moto3	2023–2024	2023 Portugal	2023 Thailand	2023 Malaysia	39	2	11	3	3	391	0
Moto2	2025–present	2025 Thailand	2025 Portugal		37	0	3	1	1	186.5	0
Total	2023–present				**76**	**2**	**14**	**4**	**4**	**577.5**	**0**

==== Races by year ====
(key) (Races in bold indicate pole position; races in italics indicate fastest lap)

Year	Class	Bike	1	2	3	4	5	6	7	8	9	10	11	12	13	14	15	16	17	18	19	20	21	22	Pos	Pts
2023	Moto3	Husqvarna	POR; 12	ARG; 22	AME; 13	SPA; 23	FRA; 15	ITA; 6	GER; Ret	NED; 7	GBR; 9	**AUT**; 4	CAT; DNS	RSM; 5	IND; Ret	JPN; 11	INA; 4	AUS; 4	THA; 3	MAL; 1	QAT; 10	**VAL**; 4			7th	149
2024	Moto3	Husqvarna	QAT; 5	POR; 6	AME; Ret	SPA; 1	FRA; 3	CAT; 4	ITA; 2	NED; 2	**GER**; 18	GBR; 3	AUT; 5	ARA; 2	RSM; 5	EMI; 3	INA; Ret	JPN; 2	AUS; 18	THA; 3	MAL; 5	SLD; 10			3rd	242
2025	Moto2	Kalex	THA; 20	ARG; 24	AME; 10	QAT; 13	SPA; 14	FRA; Ret	GBR	ARA	ITA; 20	NED; 14	GER; 16	CZE; 16	AUT; 8	HUN; 5	CAT; 9	RSM; 21	JPN; 10	INA; 8	AUS; 12	MAL; 9	POR; 2	VAL; 4	15th	97
2026	Moto2	Kalex	THA; 5^{‡}	BRA; 8	USA; Ret	**SPA**; 3	FRA; Ret	CAT; Ret	ITA; 9	HUN; 23	CZE; 11	NED; 9	GER; 9	GBR; Ret	ARA; Ret	RSM; 2	AUT; DNS	JPN	INA; 11	AUS; C	MAL; 7	QAT; Ret	POR	VAL	11th*	89.5*

^{‡} Half points awarded as less than half of the race distance (but at least three full laps) was completed.
* Season still in progress.
