= 2021 FIM CEV Moto3 Junior World Championship =

Motorcycle racing competition

2021 FIM CEV Moto3 Junior World Championship
Previous:	2020	Next:	2022
Support series: FIM CEV Moto2 European Championship; European Talent Cup

The 2021 FIM CEV Moto3 Junior World Championship was the tenth CEV Moto3 season and the eight under the FIM.

== Calendar ==
The calendar was published in November 2020. The round at Barcelona made a return in 2021.

Round	Date	Circuit	Pole position	Fastest lap	Race winner	Winning constructor
1	25 April	(Portugal) Estoril	(Spain) Iván Ortolá	(Spain) David Muñoz	(Spain) Daniel Holgado	(Spain) Gas Gas
2	9 May	(Spain) Valencia	(Spain) Daniel Holgado	(Spain) Iván Ortolá	(Spain) Daniel Holgado	(Spain) Gas Gas
2	9 May	(Spain) Valencia	(Spain) Daniel Holgado	(Spain) José Julián García	(Spain) Daniel Holgado	(Spain) Gas Gas
3	13 June	(Spain) Barcelona	(Indonesia) Mario Aji	(Spain) José Antonio Rueda	(Malaysia) Syarifuddin Azman	(Japan) Honda
3	13 June	(Spain) Barcelona	(Indonesia) Mario Aji	(Spain) Daniel Muñoz	(Spain) Daniel Holgado	(Spain) Gas Gas
4	4 July	(Portugal) Portimão	(Australia) Joel Kelso	(Australia) Joel Kelso	(Australia) Joel Kelso	(Austria) KTM
5	25 July	(Spain) Aragón	(Spain) José Antonio Rueda	(Spain) Iván Ortolá	(Spain) David Muñoz	(Austria) KTM
6	22 August	(Spain) Jerez	(Spain) Iván Ortolá	(Spain) David Salvador	(United Kingdom) Scott Ogden	(Spain) Gas Gas
6	22 August	(Spain) Jerez	(Spain) Iván Ortolá	(Spain) Iván Ortolá	(Spain) David Muñoz	(Austria) KTM
7	18 September	San Marino	(Spain) David Muñoz	(Australia) Joel Kelso	(Australia) Joel Kelso	(Austria) KTM
8	21 November	(Spain) Valencia	(United Kingdom) Scott Ogden	(Spain) Iván Ortolá	(Australia) Joel Kelso	(Austria) KTM
8	21 November	(Spain) Valencia	(United Kingdom) Scott Ogden	(Spain) Iván Ortolá	(Spain) Daniel Holgado	(Spain) Gas Gas

== Entry list ==
Team	Constructor	No.	Rider	Rounds
(Spain) Team Estrella Galicia 0,0	Honda	92	(Brazil) Diogo Moreira	All
(Spain) Team Estrella Galicia 0,0	Honda	95	(Spain) José Antonio Rueda	All
(Italy) Team MTA	KTM	22	(Italy) Elia Bartolini	6
(Italy) Team MTA	KTM	24	(Spain) Iván Ortolá	All
(Italy) Team MTA	KTM	70	(United Kingdom) Joshua Whatley	All
(Italy) Team MTA	KTM	55	(Switzerland) Noah Dettwiller	1–5, 7
(Spain) Team MT-Foundation77	KTM	14	(Spain) Álex Millán	6
(Spain) Team MT-Foundation77	KTM	29	(Australia) Bill van Eerde	1–3
(Spain) Team MT-Foundation77	KTM	57	(Japan) Sho Nishimura	All
(Spain) Team MT-Foundation77	KTM	67	(Spain) Gerard Riu	1–7
(Italy) SIC58 Squadra Corse	Honda	20	(Spain) José Julián García	All
(Italy) SIC58 Squadra Corse	Honda	21	(Australia) Harrison Voight	1–2, 4
(Italy) SIC58 Squadra Corse	Honda	81	(Australia) Senna Agius	All
(Spain) Laglisse Academy	Husqvarna	7	(Italy) Filippo Farioli	1–7
(Spain) Laglisse Academy	Husqvarna	19	(Italy) Alessandro Morosi	1–6
(Spain) Laglisse Academy	Husqvarna	45	(France) Clément Rougé	1–5
(Spain) Laglisse Academy	Husqvarna	89	(Spain) Marcos Uriarte	4–6
(Luxembourg) Leopard Impala Junior Team	Honda	13	(Spain) Marco Tapia	All
(Spain) FAU55 Tey Racing	KTM	61	(Spain) Marcos Ruda	2
(Spain) Aspar Junior Team	GasGas	26	(United Kingdom) Scott Ogden	All
(Spain) Aspar Junior Team	GasGas	80	(Colombia) David Alonso	All
(Spain) Aspar Junior Team	GasGas	96	(Spain) Daniel Holgado	All
(Japan) Asia Talent Team	Honda	32	(Japan) Takuma Matsuyama	All
(United Kingdom) British Talent Team	Honda	31	(United Kingdom) Eddie O'Shea	1–6
Honda Racing Thailand	Honda	33	(Thailand) Tatchakorn Buasri	All
(Indonesia) Astra Honda Racing Team	Honda	16	(Indonesia) Mario Aji	1–7
(Spain) Larresport	Honda	48	(France) Gabin Planques	1
(Spain) AGR Team	KTM	66	(Australia) Joel Kelso	All
(Spain) AGR Team	KTM	77	(Italy) Mattia Volpi	1–6
(Netherlands) Team Super B	Honda	84	(Netherlands) Zonta van den Goorbergh	1–7
(Italy) TM Racing Factory Team	TM Racing	10	(Italy) Nicola Carraro	All
(Italy) TM Racing Factory Team	TM Racing	38	(Spain) David Salvador	All
(Italy) TM Racing Factory Team	TM Racing	69	(Italy) Raffaele Fusco	All
(Malaysia) SIC Racing	Honda	63	(Malaysia) Syarifuddin Azman	All
(Spain) Cuna de Campeones	KTM	23	(Spain) David Real	1–5
(Spain) Avatel - Cardoso Racing	KTM	17	(Spain) Daniel Muñoz	All
(Spain) Avatel - Cardoso Racing	KTM	64	(Spain) David Muñoz	All
(Italy) AC Racing Team	KTM	9	(Netherlands) Collin Veijer	1–2
(Italy) AC Racing Team	KTM	58	(Italy) Luca Lunetta	1–2
(Italy) AC Racing Team	Husqvarna	9	(Netherlands) Collin Veijer	3–8
(Italy) AC Racing Team	Husqvarna	58	(Italy) Luca Lunetta	3–8
(Italy) Gazzola Racing	KTM	5	(Italy) Matteo Ripamonti	2
(Italy) Gazzola Racing	KTM	5	(Spain) Marcos Ruda	3, 5–7
Entry lists:

== Championship standings ==
Scoring system

Points were awarded to the top fifteen finishers. A rider had to finish the race to earn points.

Position	1st	2nd	3rd	4th	5th	6th	7th	8th	9th	10th	11th	12th	13th	14th	15th
Points	25	20	16	13	11	10	9	8	7	6	5	4	3	2	1

=== Riders' championship ===
Pos.	Rider	Bike	EST (Portugal)	VAL (Spain)		CAT (Spain)		POR (Portugal)	ARA (Spain)	JER (Spain)		RSM (San Marino)	VAL (Spain)		Points
1	(Spain) Daniel Holgado	GasGas	1	1^{P}	1^{P}	4	1	2	3	5	3	Ret	9	1	208
2	(Spain) Iván Ortolá	KTM	8^{P}	6^{F}	3	10	2	12	4^{F}	3^{P}	2^{PF}	2	3^{F}	2^{F}	169
3	(Spain) David Muñoz	KTM	5^{F}	5	Ret	2	5	5	1	2	1	3^{P}	19	Ret	150
4	(Australia) Joel Kelso	KTM	Ret	Ret	Ret	8	11	1^{PF}	8	7	7	1^{F}	1	6	124
5	(Spain) David Salvador	TM Racing	2	9	6	DNS	8	9	17	Ret^{F}	4	9	5	3	99
6	(United Kingdom) Scott Ogden	GasGas	10	15	10	5	3	10	15	1	Ret	Ret	4^{P}	5^{P}	96
7	(Colombia) David Alonso	GasGas	3	Ret	Ret	11	4	6	12	8	6	16	2	9	93
8	(Spain) José Antonio Rueda	Honda	16	10	13	3^{F}	6	4	2^{P}	Ret	DNS	19	Ret	15	69
9	(Spain) José Julián García	Honda	7	Ret	2^{F}	Ret	Ret	11	6	Ret	Ret	5	7	Ret	64
10	(Malaysia) Syarifuddin Azman	Honda	14	12	19	1	Ret	8	16	Ret	12	15	6	7	63
11	(Brazil) Diogo Moreira	Honda	9	3	Ret	Ret	DNS	Ret	7	6	9	11	Ret	8	62
12	(Indonesia) Mario Aji	Honda	4	8	5	6^{P}	Ret^{P}	DNS	Ret	Ret	8	8			58
13	(Spain) Daniel Muñoz	KTM	17	4	Ret	7	Ret^{F}	7	DNS	4	5	24	15	Ret	56
14	(Japan) Takuma Matsuyama	Honda	6	2	Ret	Ret	7	Ret	10	22	10	20	Ret	14	53
15	(Netherlands) Collin Veijer	KTM	13	7	11										43
15	(Netherlands) Collin Veijer	Husqvarna				Ret	Ret	17	26	15	14	4	12	10	43
16	(Italy) Luca Lunetta	KTM	24	Ret	14										37
16	(Italy) Luca Lunetta	Husqvarna				13	Ret	15	13	13	11	6	11	11	37
17	(Netherlands) Zonta van den Goorbergh	Honda	23	Ret	16	20	13	13	11	9	13	7			30
18	(Spain) Marcos Uriarte	Husqvarna						3	5	14	Ret				29
19	(United Kingdom) Joshua Whatley	KTM	22	11	Ret	9	9	26	Ret	Ret	16	10	Ret	Ret	25
20	(Spain) Gerard Riu	KTM	18	Ret	7	14	10	18	22	10	20	Ret			23
21	(Italy) Matteo Bertelle	KTM											8	4	21
22	(Spain) Marco Tapia	Honda	19	16	8	17	Ret	14	9	Ret	15	18	18	Ret	18
23	(Spain) Marcos Ruda	KTM		14	4	23	Ret		Ret	Ret	22	27			15
24	(Thailand) Tatchakorn Buasri	Honda	15	Ret	DNS	12	Ret	Ret	Ret	12	18	17	13	Ret	12
25	(Spain) David Real	KTM	20	13	9	15	Ret	DNS	19						11
26	(Spain) Alberto Ferrández	KTM											10	12	10
27	(Switzerland) Noah Dettwiler	KTM	11	17	15	19	14	24	20			Ret			8
28	(Italy) Filippo Farioli	Husqvarna	28	22	DNS	24	Ret	25	24	11	Ret	Ret			5
29	(Italy) Raffaele Fusco	TM Racing	Ret	19	18	16	Ret	16	14	16	Ret	13	DNS	DNS	5
30	(Spain) Adrián Cruces	KTM										12			4
31	(Italy) Nicola Carraro	TM Racing	24	Ret	DNS	21	12	23	Ret	Ret	17	22	22	19	4
32	(France) Clément Rougé	Husqvarna	Ret	18	12	Ret	Ret	20	23						4
33	(Australia) Harrison Voight	Honda	12	DNS	DNS			DNS							4
34	(Argentina) Marco Morelli	KTM											16	13	3
35	(Australia) Senna Agius	Honda	26	Ret	17	Ret	15	19	18	19	Ret	23	14	16	3
36	(Japan) Sho Nishimura	KTM	Ret	20	Ret	18	Ret	27	21	20	19	14	Ret	23	2
	(United Kingdom) Eddie O'Shea	Honda	27	Ret	DNS	22	16	21	Ret	Ret	23				0
	(Italy) Mattia Volpi	KTM	Ret	Ret	Ret	Ret	18	Ret	25	17	21				0
	(Italy) Alessandro Morosi	Husqvarna	29	21	Ret	25	17	22	27	21	24				0
	(Italy) Elia Bartolini	KTM								18	Ret				0
	(Australia) Bill Van Eerde	KTM	21	Ret	20	Ret	Ret								0
	(Spain) Álex Millán	KTM								Ret	Ret				0
	(Italy) Matteo Ripamonti	KTM		DNS	DNS										
	(France) Gabin Planques	Honda	WD												
Pos.	Rider	Bike	EST (Portugal)	VAL (Spain)		CAT (Spain)		POR (Portugal)	ARA (Spain)	JER (Spain)		RSM (San Marino)	VAL (Spain)		Points

Colour	Result
Gold	Winner
Silver	Second place
Bronze	Third place
Green	Points classification
Blue	Non-points classification
Blue	Non-classified finish (NC)
Purple	Retired, not classified (Ret)
Red	Did not qualify (DNQ)
Red	Did not pre-qualify (DNPQ)
Black	Disqualified (DSQ)
White	Did not start (DNS)
White	Withdrew (WD)
White	Race cancelled (C)
Blank	Did not practice (DNP)
Blank	Did not arrive (DNA)
Blank	Excluded (EX)

P – Pole position
F – Fastest lap

=== Constructors' championship ===
Pos.	Constructor	EST (Portugal)	VAL (Spain)		CAT (Spain)		POR (Portugal)	ARA (Spain)	JER (Spain)		RSM (San Marino)	VAL (Spain)		Points
1	(Austria) KTM	5	4	3	2	2	1	1	2	1	1	1	2	245
2	(Spain) GasGas	1	1	1	4	1	2	3	1	3	16	2	1	235
3	(Japan) Honda	4	2	2	1	6	4	2	6	8	5	6	7	169
4	(Italy) TM Racing	2	9	6	16	8	9	14	16	4	9	5	3	101
5	(Sweden) Husqvarna	28	18	12	13	17	3	5	11	11	4	11	10	68
Pos.	Constructor	EST (Portugal)	VAL (Spain)		CAT (Spain)		POR (Portugal)	ARA (Spain)	JER (Spain)		RSM (San Marino)	VAL (Spain)		Points
