= 2024 Australian motorcycle Grand Prix =

Motorcycle races in Phillip Island

(Australia) 2024 Australian Grand Prix
Race details
- Race 17 of 20 races in the 2024 Grand Prix motorcycle racing season
- Date: 20 October 2024
- Official name: Qatar Airways Australian Motorcycle Grand Prix
- Location: Phillip Island Grand Prix Circuit; Phillip Island, Victoria, Australia
- Course: Permanent racing facility; 4.448 km (2.764 mi)

MotoGP
Pole position
Rider	(Spain) Jorge Martín	Ducati
Time	1:27.296	
Fastest lap
Rider	(Spain) Marc Márquez	Ducati
Time	1:27.765 on lap 9	
Podium
First	(Spain) Marc Márquez	Ducati
Second	(Spain) Jorge Martín	Ducati
Third	(Italy) Francesco Bagnaia	Ducati

Moto2
Pole position
Rider	(Spain) Fermín Aldeguer	Boscoscuro
Time	1:30.876	
Fastest lap
Rider	(Spain) Arón Canet	Kalex
Time	1:30.816 on lap 14	
Podium
First	(Spain) Fermín Aldeguer	Boscoscuro
Second	(Spain) Arón Canet	Kalex
Third	(Australia) Senna Agius	Kalex

Moto3
Pole position
Rider	(Spain) Iván Ortolá	KTM
Time	1:35.872	
Fastest lap
Rider	(Italy) Stefano Nepa	KTM
Time	1:35.370 on lap 3	
Podium
First	(Colombia) David Alonso	CFMoto
Second	(Spain) Daniel Holgado	Gas Gas
Third	(Spain) Adrián Fernández	Honda

The 2024 Australian motorcycle Grand Prix (officially known as the Qatar Airways Australian Motorcycle Grand Prix) was the seventeenth round of the 2024 Grand Prix motorcycle racing season. It was held at the Phillip Island Grand Prix Circuit in Phillip Island on 20 October 2024.

== MotoGP Sprint ==
The MotoGP Sprint was held on 19 October.

Pos.	No.	Rider	Team	Constructor	Laps	Time/Retired	Grid	Points
1	89	(Spain) Jorge Martín	Prima Pramac Racing	Ducati	13	19:13.301	1	12
2	93	(Spain) Marc Márquez	Gresini Racing MotoGP	Ducati	13	+1.520	2	9
3	23	(Italy) Enea Bastianini	Ducati Lenovo Team	Ducati	13	+4.368	10	7
4	1	(Italy) Francesco Bagnaia	Ducati Lenovo Team	Ducati	13	+6.879	5	6
5	21	(Italy) Franco Morbidelli	Prima Pramac Racing	Ducati	13	+9.623	7	5
6	25	(Spain) Raúl Fernández	Trackhouse Racing	Aprilia	13	+15.249	6	4
7	49	(Italy) Fabio Di Giannantonio	Pertamina Enduro VR46 Racing Team	Ducati	13	+15.905 (Note: 8-second penalty for low tyre pressure.)	12	3
8	41	(Spain) Aleix Espargaró	Aprilia Racing	Aprilia	13	+19.280	20	2
9	37	(Spain) Augusto Fernández	Red Bull GasGas Tech3	KTM	13	+21.126	17	1
10	10	(Italy) Luca Marini	Repsol Honda Team	Honda	13	+21.194	13	
11	20	(France) Fabio Quartararo	Monster Energy Yamaha MotoGP Team	Yamaha	13	+21.379	19	
12	42	(Spain) Álex Rins	Monster Energy Yamaha MotoGP Team	Yamaha	13	+21.483	9	
13	36	(Spain) Joan Mir	Repsol Honda Team	Honda	13	+23.528	18	
14	30	(Japan) Takaaki Nakagami	Idemitsu Honda LCR	Honda	13	+34.055	21	
15	32	(Italy) Lorenzo Savadori	Trackhouse Racing	Aprilia	13	+38.324	22	
Ret	33	(South Africa) Brad Binder	Red Bull KTM Factory Racing	KTM	11	Accident	11	
Ret	72	(Italy) Marco Bezzecchi	Pertamina Enduro VR46 Racing Team	Ducati	11	Collision	4	
Ret	12	(Spain) Maverick Viñales	Aprilia Racing	Aprilia	11	Collision	3	
Ret	31	(Spain) Pedro Acosta	Red Bull GasGas Tech3	KTM	10	Accident	15	
Ret	43	(Australia) Jack Miller	Red Bull KTM Factory Racing	KTM	7	Accident	16	
Ret	73	(Spain) Álex Márquez	Gresini Racing MotoGP	Ducati	5	Accident	8	
Ret	5	(France) Johann Zarco	Castrol Honda LCR	Honda	4	Accident	14	
Fastest lap: (Spain) Jorge Martín (Ducati) – 1:27.831 (lap 7)
OFFICIAL MOTOGP SPRINT REPORT

== Race ==
=== MotoGP ===
Pos.	No.	Rider	Team	Constructor	Laps	Time/Retired	Grid	Points
1	93	(Spain) Marc Márquez	Gresini Racing MotoGP	Ducati	27	39:47.702	2	25
2	89	(Spain) Jorge Martín	Prima Pramac Racing	Ducati	27	+0.997	1	20
3	1	(Italy) Francesco Bagnaia	Ducati Lenovo Team	Ducati	27	+10.100	5	16
4	49	(Italy) Fabio Di Giannantonio	Pertamina Enduro VR46 Racing Team	Ducati	27	+12.997	12	13
5	23	(Italy) Enea Bastianini	Ducati Lenovo Team	Ducati	27	+13.310	10	11
6	21	(Italy) Franco Morbidelli	Prima Pramac Racing	Ducati	27	+15.434	7	10
7	33	(South Africa) Brad Binder	Red Bull KTM Factory Racing	KTM	27	+15.450	11	9
8	12	(Spain) Maverick Viñales	Aprilia Racing	Aprilia	27	+16.636	3	8
9	20	(France) Fabio Quartararo	Monster Energy Yamaha MotoGP Team	Yamaha	27	+18.757	18	7
10	25	(Spain) Raúl Fernández	Trackhouse Racing	Aprilia	27	+19.345	6	6
11	43	(Australia) Jack Miller	Red Bull KTM Factory Racing	KTM	27	+19.932	15	5
12	5	(France) Johann Zarco	Castrol Honda LCR	Honda	27	+20.295	14	4
13	42	(Spain) Álex Rins	Monster Energy Yamaha MotoGP Team	Yamaha	27	+22.210	9	3
14	10	(Italy) Luca Marini	Repsol Honda Team	Honda	27	+24.239	13	2
15	73	(Spain) Álex Márquez	Gresini Racing MotoGP	Ducati	27	+24.591	8	1
16	41	(Spain) Aleix Espargaró	Aprilia Racing	Aprilia	27	+30.499	19	
17	37	(Spain) Augusto Fernández	Red Bull GasGas Tech3	KTM	27	+30.533	16	
18	30	(Japan) Takaaki Nakagami	Idemitsu Honda LCR	Honda	27	+30.765	21	
19	72	(Italy) Marco Bezzecchi	Pertamina Enduro VR46 Racing Team	Ducati	27	+45.393	4	
Ret	36	(Spain) Joan Mir	Repsol Honda Team	Honda	25	Accident	17	
Ret	32	(Italy) Lorenzo Savadori	Trackhouse Racing	Aprilia	17	Retired	20	
DNS	31	(Spain) Pedro Acosta	Red Bull GasGas Tech3	KTM		Did not start		
Fastest lap: (Spain) Marc Márquez (Ducati) – 1:27.765 (lap 9)
OFFICIAL MOTOGP RACE REPORT

== Championship standings after the race ==
Below are the standings for the top five riders, constructors, and teams after the round.

=== MotoGP ===
Riders' Championship standings

	Pos.	Rider	Points
	1	(Spain) Jorge Martín	424
	2	(Italy) Francesco Bagnaia	404
1	3	(Spain) Marc Márquez	345
1	4	(Italy) Enea Bastianini	331
	5	(South Africa) Brad Binder	192

Constructors' Championship standings

Pos.	Constructor	Points
1	(Italy) Ducati	611
2	(Austria) KTM	285
3	(Italy) Aprilia	267
4	(Japan) Yamaha	104
5	(Japan) Honda	60

Teams' Championship standings

Pos.	Team	Points
1	(Italy) Ducati Lenovo Team	735
2	(Italy) Prima Pramac Racing	575
3	(Italy) Gresini Racing MotoGP	470
4	(Italy) Aprilia Racing	307
5	(Italy) Pertamina Enduro VR46 Racing Team	284

=== Moto2 ===
Riders' Championship standings

	Pos.	Rider	Points
	1	(Japan) Ai Ogura	241
2	2	(Spain) Arón Canet	176
4	3	(Spain) Fermín Aldeguer	175
2	4	(Spain) Sergio García	175
2	5	(Spain) Alonso López	163

Constructors' Championship standings

Pos.	Constructor	Points
1	(Germany) Kalex	362
2	(Italy) Boscoscuro	353
3	(Switzerland) Forward	16

Teams' Championship standings

	Pos.	Team	Points
	1	(Spain) MT Helmets – MSi	416
	2	(Italy) Beta Tools Speed Up	338
	3	(United States) OnlyFans American Racing Team	238
	4	(Italy) Gresini Moto2	231
1	5	(Belgium) Elf Marc VDS Racing Team	194

=== Moto3 ===
Riders' Championship standings

	Pos.	Rider	Points
	1	(Colombia) David Alonso	346
	2	(Spain) Daniel Holgado	232
	3	(Netherlands) Collin Veijer	209
	4	(Spain) Iván Ortolá	191
1	5	(Spain) Adrián Fernández	153

Constructors' Championship standings

	Pos.	Constructor	Points
	1	(China) CFMoto	346
	2	(Austria) KTM	291
1	3	(Japan) Honda	244
1	4	(Spain) Gas Gas	237
2	5	(Sweden) Husqvarna	236

Teams' Championship standings

	Pos.	Team	Points
	1	(Spain) CFMoto Gaviota Aspar Team	391
1	2	(Spain) MT Helmets – MSi	297
1	3	(Germany) Liqui Moly Husqvarna Intact GP	291
	4	(Luxembourg) Leopard Racing	290
	5	(France) Red Bull GasGas Tech3	285

Previous race: 2024 Japanese Grand Prix	FIM Grand Prix World Championship; 2024 season	Next race: 2024 Thailand Grand Prix
Previous race: 2023 Australian Grand Prix	Australian motorcycle Grand Prix	Next race: 2025 Australian Grand Prix
