= 2024 Emilia Romagna motorcycle Grand Prix =

Motorcycle races in Misano Adriatico

(Emilia-Romagna) 2024 Emilia Romagna Grand Prix
Race details
- Race 14 of 20 races in the 2024 Grand Prix motorcycle racing season
- Date: 22 September 2024
- Official name: Gran Premio Pramac dell’Emilia-Romagna
- Location: Misano World Circuit Marco Simoncelli; Misano Adriatico, Province of Rimini, Italy
- Course: Permanent racing facility; 4.226 km (2.626 mi)

MotoGP
Pole position
| Rider | (Italy) Francesco Bagnaia | Ducati |
| Time | 1:30.031 | |
Fastest lap
| Rider | (Italy) Francesco Bagnaia | Ducati |
| Time | 1:30.877 on lap 16 | |
Podium
| First | (Italy) Enea Bastianini | Ducati |
| Second | (Spain) Jorge Martín | Ducati |
| Third | (Spain) Marc Márquez | Ducati |

Moto2
Pole position
| Rider | (Spain) Arón Canet | Kalex |
| Time | 1:34.935 | |
Fastest lap
| Rider | (Italy) Celestino Vietti | Kalex |
| Time | 1:35.468 on lap 4 | |
Podium
| First | (Italy) Celestino Vietti | Kalex |
| Second | (Spain) Arón Canet | Kalex |
| Third | (Italy) Tony Arbolino | Kalex |

Moto3
Pole position
| Rider | (Japan) Taiyo Furusato | Honda |
| Time | 1:40.394 | |
Fastest lap
| Rider | (Netherlands) Collin Veijer | Husqvarna |
| Time | 1:40.629 on lap 13 | |
Podium
| First | (Colombia) David Alonso | CFMoto |
| Second | (Spain) Ángel Piqueras | Honda |
| Third | (Netherlands) Collin Veijer | Husqvarna |

The 2024 Emilia Romagna motorcycle Grand Prix (officially known as the Gran Premio Pramac dell’Emilia-Romagna) was the fourteenth round of the 2024 Grand Prix motorcycle racing season. It was held at the Misano World Circuit Marco Simoncelli in Misano Adriatico on 22 September 2024. The Grand Prix returned to the calendar after being last held in 2021.

After Enea Bastianini's win in the MotoGP race, Ducati secured its fifth consecutive and sixth overall Constructors' Championship in the MotoGP class.

== MotoGP Sprint ==
The MotoGP Sprint was held on 21 September.

| Pos. | No. | Rider | Team | Constructor | Laps | Time/Retired | Grid | Points |
|---|---|---|---|---|---|---|---|---|
| 1 | 1 | (Italy) Francesco Bagnaia | Ducati Lenovo Team | Ducati | 13 | 19:50.237 | 1 | 12 |
| 2 | 89 | (Spain) Jorge Martín | Prima Pramac Racing | Ducati | 13 | +0.285 | 2 | 9 |
| 3 | 23 | (Italy) Enea Bastianini | Ducati Lenovo Team | Ducati | 13 | +1.319 | 3 | 7 |
| 4 | 93 | (Spain) Marc Márquez | Gresini Racing MotoGP | Ducati | 13 | +5.386 | 7 | 6 |
| 5 | 31 | (Spain) Pedro Acosta | Red Bull GasGas Tech3 | KTM | 13 | +6.580 | 5 | 5 |
| 6 | 33 | (South Africa) Brad Binder | Red Bull KTM Factory Racing | KTM | 13 | +8.143 | 4 | 4 |
| 7 | 20 | (France) Fabio Quartararo | Monster Energy Yamaha MotoGP Team | Yamaha | 13 | +8.405 | 9 | 3 |
| 8 | 72 | (Italy) Marco Bezzecchi | Pertamina Enduro VR46 Racing Team | Ducati | 13 | +8.865 | 6 | 2 |
| 9 | 21 | (Italy) Franco Morbidelli | Prima Pramac Racing | Ducati | 13 | +9.271 | 10 | 1 |
| 10 | 12 | (Spain) Maverick Viñales | Aprilia Racing | Aprilia | 13 | +9.538 | 8 | |
| 11 | 88 | (Portugal) Miguel Oliveira | Trackhouse Racing | Aprilia | 13 | +11.542 | 12 | |
| 12 | 41 | (Spain) Aleix Espargaró | Aprilia Racing | Aprilia | 13 | +12.049 | 11 | |
| 13 | 73 | (Spain) Álex Márquez | Gresini Racing MotoGP | Ducati | 13 | +16.566 | 21 | |
| 14 | 43 | (Australia) Jack Miller | Red Bull KTM Factory Racing | KTM | 13 | +19.411 | 19 | |
| 15 | 10 | (Italy) Luca Marini | Repsol Honda Team | Honda | 13 | +20.101 | 15 | |
| 16 | 5 | (France) Johann Zarco | Castrol Honda LCR | Honda | 13 | +20.598 | 17 | |
| 17 | 25 | (Spain) Raúl Fernández | Trackhouse Racing | Aprilia | 13 | +20.742 | 14 | |
| 18 | 49 | (Italy) Fabio Di Giannantonio | Pertamina Enduro VR46 Racing Team | Ducati | 13 | +22.819 | 13 | |
| 19 | 30 | (Japan) Takaaki Nakagami | Idemitsu Honda LCR | Honda | 13 | +25.394 | 20 | |
| 20 | 37 | (Spain) Augusto Fernández | Red Bull GasGas Tech3 | KTM | 13 | +25.431 | 18 | |
| 21 | 36 | (Spain) Joan Mir | Repsol Honda Team | Honda | 13 | +27.208 | 16 | |
Fastest lap: (Italy) Francesco Bagnaia (Ducati) – 1:30.792 (lap 5)
OFFICIAL MOTOGP SPRINT REPORT

== Race ==
=== MotoGP ===
| Pos. | No. | Rider | Team | Constructor | Laps | Time/Retired | Grid | Points |
|---|---|---|---|---|---|---|---|---|
| 1 | 23 | (Italy) Enea Bastianini | Ducati Lenovo Team | Ducati | 27 | 41:14.653 | 3 | 25 |
| 2 | 89 | (Spain) Jorge Martín | Prima Pramac Racing | Ducati | 27 | +5.002 | 2 | 20 |
| 3 | 93 | (Spain) Marc Márquez | Gresini Racing MotoGP | Ducati | 27 | +7.848 | 7 | 16 |
| 4 | 72 | (Italy) Marco Bezzecchi | Pertamina Enduro VR46 Racing Team | Ducati | 27 | +9.200 | 6 | 13 |
| 5 | 21 | (Italy) Franco Morbidelli | Prima Pramac Racing | Ducati | 27 | +13.601 | 10 | 11 |
| 6 | 12 | (Spain) Maverick Viñales | Aprilia Racing | Aprilia | 27 | +15.484 | 8 | 10 |
| 7 | 20 | (France) Fabio Quartararo | Monster Energy Yamaha MotoGP Team | Yamaha | 27 | +20.922 | 9 | 9 |
| 8 | 41 | (Spain) Aleix Espargaró | Aprilia Racing | Aprilia | 27 | +22.795 | 11 | 8 |
| 9 | 73 | (Spain) Álex Márquez | Gresini Racing MotoGP | Ducati | 27 | +27.704 | 21 | 7 |
| 10 | 88 | (Portugal) Miguel Oliveira | Trackhouse Racing | Aprilia | 27 | +31.891 | 12 | 6 |
| 11 | 36 | (Spain) Joan Mir | Repsol Honda Team | Honda | 27 | +33.062 | 16 | 5 |
| 12 | 10 | (Italy) Luca Marini | Repsol Honda Team | Honda | 27 | +35.411 | 15 | 4 |
| 13 | 25 | (Spain) Raúl Fernández | Trackhouse Racing | Aprilia | 27 | +36.335 | 14 | 3 |
| 14 | 49 | (Italy) Fabio Di Giannantonio | Pertamina Enduro VR46 Racing Team | Ducati | 27 | +37.395 | 13 | 2 |
| 15 | 5 | (France) Johann Zarco | Castrol Honda LCR | Honda | 27 | +38.909 | 17 | 1 |
| 16 | 43 | (Australia) Jack Miller | Red Bull KTM Factory Racing | KTM | 27 | +40.454 | 19 | |
| 17 | 30 | (Japan) Takaaki Nakagami | Idemitsu Honda LCR | Honda | 27 | +46.394 | 20 | |
| 18 | 37 | (Spain) Augusto Fernández | Red Bull GasGas Tech3 | KTM | 27 | +47.755 | 18 | |
| 19 | 33 | (South Africa) Brad Binder | Red Bull KTM Factory Racing | KTM | 27 | +1:25.918 | 4 | |
| Ret | 1 | (Italy) Francesco Bagnaia | Ducati Lenovo Team | Ducati | 20 | Accident | 1 | |
| Ret | 31 | (Spain) Pedro Acosta | Red Bull GasGas Tech3 | KTM | 8 | Accident | 5 | |
Fastest lap: (Italy) Francesco Bagnaia (Ducati) – 1:30.877 (lap 16)
OFFICIAL MOTOGP RACE REPORT

== Championship standings after the race ==
Below are the standings for the top five riders, constructors, and teams after the round.

=== MotoGP ===
Riders' Championship standings

| | Pos. | Rider | Points |
|---|---|---|---|
| | 1 | (Spain) Jorge Martín | 341 |
| | 2 | (Italy) Francesco Bagnaia | 317 |
| 1 | 3 | (Italy) Enea Bastianini | 282 |
| 1 | 4 | (Spain) Marc Márquez | 281 |
| | 5 | (South Africa) Brad Binder | 165 |

Constructors' Championship standings

| Pos. | Constructor | Points |
|---|---|---|
| 1 | (Italy) Ducati | 500 |
| 2 | (Austria) KTM | 239 |
| 3 | (Italy) Aprilia | 234 |
| 4 | (Japan) Yamaha | 84 |
| 5 | (Japan) Honda | 42 |

Teams' Championship standings

| | Pos. | Team | Points |
|---|---|---|---|
| | 1 | (Italy) Ducati Lenovo Team | 599 |
| | 2 | (Italy) Prima Pramac Racing | 443 |
| | 3 | (Italy) Gresini Racing MotoGP | 402 |
| | 4 | (Italy) Aprilia Racing | 276 |
| 1 | 5 | (Italy) Pertamina Enduro VR46 Racing Team | 229 |

=== Moto2 ===
Riders' Championship standings

| | Pos. | Rider | Points |
|---|---|---|---|
| | 1 | (Japan) Ai Ogura | 188 |
| | 2 | (Spain) Sergio García | 166 |
| | 3 | (United States) Joe Roberts | 143 |
| | 4 | (Spain) Alonso López | 140 |
| 1 | 5 | (Spain) Fermín Aldeguer | 133 |

Constructors' Championship standings

| | Pos. | Constructor | Points |
|---|---|---|---|
| 1 | 1 | (Germany) Kalex | 292 |
| 1 | 2 | (Italy) Boscoscuro | 288 |
| | 3 | (Switzerland) Forward | 6 |

Teams' Championship standings

| Pos. | Team | Points |
|---|---|---|
| 1 | (Spain) MT Helmets – MSi | 354 |
| 2 | (Italy) MB Conveyors Speed Up | 273 |
| 3 | (United States) OnlyFans American Racing Team | 216 |
| 4 | (Italy) QJmotor Gresini Moto2 | 183 |
| 5 | (Spain) CFMoto Inde Aspar Team | 158 |

=== Moto3 ===
Riders' Championship standings

| | Pos. | Rider | Points |
|---|---|---|---|
| | 1 | (Colombia) David Alonso | 271 |
| | 2 | (Spain) Daniel Holgado | 189 |
| | 3 | (Netherlands) Collin Veijer | 189 |
| | 4 | (Spain) Iván Ortolá | 184 |
| 2 | 5 | (Spain) Ángel Piqueras | 118 |

Constructors' Championship standings

| Pos. | Constructor | Points |
|---|---|---|
| 1 | (China) CFMoto | 271 |
| 2 | (Austria) KTM | 251 |
| 3 | (Sweden) Husqvarna | 206 |
| 4 | (Spain) Gas Gas | 194 |
| 5 | (Japan) Honda | 192 |

Teams' Championship standings

| | Pos. | Team | Points |
|---|---|---|---|
| | 1 | (Spain) CFMoto Gaviota Aspar Team | 313 |
| | 2 | (Spain) MT Helmets – MSi | 270 |
| | 3 | (Germany) Liqui Moly Husqvarna Intact GP | 252 |
| | 4 | (France) Red Bull GasGas Tech3 | 239 |
| 1 | 5 | (Luxembourg) Leopard Racing | 219 |

| Previous race: 2024 San Marino Grand Prix | FIM Grand Prix World Championship; 2024 season | Next race: 2024 Indonesian Grand Prix |
| Previous race: 2021 Emilia Romagna Grand Prix | Emilia Romagna motorcycle Grand Prix | Next race: None |
