= 2024 British motorcycle Grand Prix =

Motorcycle races in Silverstone, England

(United Kingdom) 2024 British Grand Prix
Race details
- Race 10 of 20 races in the 2024 Grand Prix motorcycle racing season
- Date: 4 August 2024
- Official name: Monster Energy British Grand Prix
- Location: Silverstone Circuit; Silverstone, United Kingdom
- Course: Permanent racing facility; 5.900 km (3.666 mi)

MotoGP
Pole position
Rider	(Spain) Aleix Espargaró	Aprilia
Time	1:57.309	
Fastest lap
Rider	(Spain) Aleix Espargaró	Aprilia
Time	1:58.895 on lap 3	
Podium
First	(Italy) Enea Bastianini	Ducati
Second	(Spain) Jorge Martín	Ducati
Third	(Italy) Francesco Bagnaia	Ducati

Moto2
Pole position
Rider	(Japan) Ai Ogura	Boscoscuro
Time	2:02.940	
Fastest lap
Rider	(Spain) Arón Canet	Kalex
Time	2:03.984 on lap 2	
Podium
First	(United Kingdom) Jake Dixon	Kalex
Second	(Spain) Arón Canet	Kalex
Third	(Italy) Celestino Vietti	Kalex

Moto3
Pole position
Rider	(Spain) Iván Ortolá	KTM
Time	2:09.270	
Fastest lap
Rider	(Spain) Adrián Fernández	Honda
Time	2:09.727 on lap 4	
Podium
First	(Spain) Iván Ortolá	KTM
Second	(Colombia) David Alonso	CFMoto
Third	(Netherlands) Collin Veijer	Husqvarna

The 2024 British motorcycle Grand Prix (officially known as the Monster Energy British Grand Prix) was the tenth round of the 2024 Grand Prix motorcycle racing season. It was held at the Silverstone Circuit in Silverstone on 4 August 2024.

All 11 teams and riders have officially unveiled their special liveries ahead of this weekend's 75th anniversary celebrations at the Monster Energy British Grand Prix.

Álex Rins withdrew from the race due to a hand and foot injury he sustained during the Dutch round.

== MotoGP Sprint ==
The MotoGP Sprint was held on 3 August.

Pos.	No.	Rider	Team	Constructor	Laps	Time/Retired	Grid	Points
1	23	(Italy) Enea Bastianini	Ducati Lenovo Team	Ducati	10	19:49.929	3	12
2	89	(Spain) Jorge Martín	Prima Pramac Racing	Ducati	10	+1.094	4	9
3	41	(Spain) Aleix Espargaró	Aprilia Racing	Aprilia	10	+2.023	1	7
4	33	(South Africa) Brad Binder	Red Bull KTM Factory Racing	KTM	10	+8.644	6	6
5	31	(Spain) Pedro Acosta	Red Bull GasGas Tech3	KTM	10	+8.777	9	5
6	73	(Spain) Álex Márquez	Gresini Racing MotoGP	Ducati	10	+9.043	5	4
7	43	(Australia) Jack Miller	Red Bull KTM Factory Racing	KTM	10	+11.504	11	3
8	12	(Spain) Maverick Viñales	Aprilia Racing	Aprilia	10	+11.689	8	2
9	49	(Italy) Fabio Di Giannantonio	Pertamina Enduro VR46 Racing Team	Ducati	10	+11.828	10	1
10	88	(Portugal) Miguel Oliveira	Trackhouse Racing	Aprilia	10	+13.328	15	
11	20	(France) Fabio Quartararo	Monster Energy Yamaha MotoGP Team	Yamaha	10	+15.373	18	
12	25	(Spain) Raúl Fernández	Trackhouse Racing	Aprilia	10	+18.234	14	
13	37	(Spain) Augusto Fernández	Red Bull GasGas Tech3	KTM	10	+18.326	17	
14	5	(France) Johann Zarco	Castrol Honda LCR	Honda	10	+18.492	16	
15	10	(Italy) Luca Marini	Repsol Honda Team	Honda	10	+19.050	19	
16	36	(Spain) Joan Mir	Repsol Honda Team	Honda	10	+19.674	20	
17	30	(Japan) Takaaki Nakagami	Idemitsu Honda LCR	Honda	10	+29.302	21	
18	87	(Australia) Remy Gardner	Monster Energy Yamaha MotoGP Team	Yamaha	10	+31.070	22	
Ret	93	(Spain) Marc Márquez	Gresini Racing MotoGP	Ducati	9	Accident damage	7	
Ret	1	(Italy) Francesco Bagnaia	Ducati Lenovo Team	Ducati	4	Accident	2	
Ret	72	(Italy) Marco Bezzecchi	Pertamina Enduro VR46 Racing Team	Ducati	0	Accident	12	
Ret	21	(Italy) Franco Morbidelli	Prima Pramac Racing	Ducati	0	Accident	13	
Fastest sprint lap: (Italy) Francesco Bagnaia (Ducati) – 1:58.260 (lap 4)
OFFICIAL MOTOGP SPRINT REPORT

== Race ==
=== MotoGP ===
Pos.	No.	Rider	Team	Constructor	Laps	Time/Retired	Grid	Points
1	23	(Italy) Enea Bastianini	Ducati Lenovo Team	Ducati	20	39:51.879	3	25
2	89	(Spain) Jorge Martín	Prima Pramac Racing	Ducati	20	+1.931	4	20
3	1	(Italy) Francesco Bagnaia	Ducati Lenovo Team	Ducati	20	+5.866	2	16
4	93	(Spain) Marc Márquez	Gresini Racing MotoGP	Ducati	20	+6.906	7	13
5	49	(Italy) Fabio Di Giannantonio	Pertamina Enduro VR46 Racing Team	Ducati	20	+7.736	10	11
6	41	(Spain) Aleix Espargaró	Aprilia Racing	Aprilia	20	+9.514	1	10
7	73	(Spain) Álex Márquez	Gresini Racing MotoGP	Ducati	20	+9.741	5	9
8	72	(Italy) Marco Bezzecchi	Pertamina Enduro VR46 Racing Team	Ducati	20	+14.016	12	8
9	31	(Spain) Pedro Acosta	Red Bull GasGas Tech3	KTM	20	+16.386	9	7
10	21	(Italy) Franco Morbidelli	Prima Pramac Racing	Ducati	20	+23.609	13	6
11	20	(France) Fabio Quartararo	Monster Energy Yamaha MotoGP Team	Yamaha	20	+24.202	18	5
12	43	(Australia) Jack Miller	Red Bull KTM Factory Racing	KTM	20	+25.767	11	4
13	12	(Spain) Maverick Viñales	Aprilia Racing	Aprilia	20	+26.751	8	3
14	5	(France) Johann Zarco	Castrol Honda LCR	Honda	20	+26.953	16	2
15	30	(Japan) Takaaki Nakagami	Idemitsu Honda LCR	Honda	20	+37.278	21	1
16	37	(Spain) Augusto Fernández	Red Bull GasGas Tech3	KTM	20	+37.605	17	
17	10	(Italy) Luca Marini	Repsol Honda Team	Honda	20	+47.507 (Note: 16-second penalty for low tyre pressure.)	19	
18	87	(Australia) Remy Gardner	Monster Energy Yamaha MotoGP Team	Yamaha	20	+59.137	22	
Ret	36	(Spain) Joan Mir	Repsol Honda Team	Honda	11	Retired	20	
Ret	33	(South Africa) Brad Binder	Red Bull KTM Factory Racing	KTM	0	Technical issue	6	
Ret	88	(Portugal) Miguel Oliveira	Trackhouse Racing	Aprilia	0	Accident	15	
Ret	25	(Spain) Raúl Fernández	Trackhouse Racing	Aprilia	0	Accident	14	
Fastest lap: (Spain) Aleix Espargaró (Aprilia) – 1:58.895 (lap 3)
OFFICIAL MOTOGP RACE REPORT

== Championship standings after the race ==
Below are the standings for the top five riders, constructors, and teams after the round.

=== MotoGP ===
Riders' Championship standings

	Pos.	Rider	Points
1	1	(Spain) Jorge Martín	241
1	2	(Italy) Francesco Bagnaia	238
1	3	(Italy) Enea Bastianini	192
1	4	(Spain) Marc Márquez	179
	5	(Spain) Maverick Viñales	130

Constructors' Championship standings

Pos.	Constructor	Points
1	(Italy) Ducati	352
2	(Italy) Aprilia	192
3	(Austria) KTM	178
4	(Japan) Yamaha	53
5	(Japan) Honda	26

Teams' Championship standings

Pos.	Team	Points
1	(Italy) Ducati Lenovo Team	430
2	(Italy) Prima Pramac Racing	302
3	(Italy) Gresini Racing MotoGP	271
4	(Italy) Aprilia Racing	229
5	(Italy) Pertamina Enduro VR46 Racing Team	165

=== Moto2 ===
Riders' Championship standings

Pos.	Rider	Points
1	(Spain) Sergio García	160
2	(Japan) Ai Ogura	142
3	(United States) Joe Roberts	123
4	(Spain) Fermín Aldeguer	112
5	(Spain) Alonso López	100

Constructors' Championship standings

Pos.	Constructor	Points
1	(Italy) Boscoscuro	217
2	(Germany) Kalex	197
3	(Switzerland) Forward	6

Teams' Championship standings

Pos.	Team	Points
1	(Spain) MT Helmets – MSi	302
2	(Italy) GT Trevisan Speed Up	212
3	(United States) OnlyFans American Racing Team	168
4	(Italy) QJmotor Gresini Moto2	144
5	(Spain) CFMoto Inde Aspar Team	99

=== Moto3 ===
Riders' Championship standings

Pos.	Rider	Points
1	(Colombia) David Alonso	199
2	(Spain) Iván Ortolá	146
3	(Spain) Daniel Holgado	133
4	(Netherlands) Collin Veijer	131
5	(Spain) David Muñoz	88

Constructors' Championship standings

Pos.	Constructor	Points
1	(China) CFMoto	199
2	(Austria) KTM	179
3	(Sweden) Husqvarna	148
4	(Spain) Gas Gas	138
5	(Japan) Honda	118

Teams' Championship standings

Pos.	Team	Points
1	(Spain) CFMoto Valresa Aspar Team	240
2	(Spain) MT Helmets – MSi	228
3	(France) Red Bull GasGas Tech3	177
4	(Germany) Liqui Moly Husqvarna Intact GP	175
5	(Spain) Boé Motorsports	152

== Notes ==
Previous race: 2024 German Grand Prix	FIM Grand Prix World Championship; 2024 season	Next race: 2024 Austrian Grand Prix
Previous race: 2023 British Grand Prix	British motorcycle Grand Prix	Next race: 2025 British Grand Prix
