= 2024 Malaysian motorcycle Grand Prix =

Motorcycle races in Sepang

(Malaysia) 2024 Malaysian Grand Prix
Race details
- Race 19 of 20 races in the 2024 Grand Prix motorcycle racing season
- Date: 3 November 2024
- Official name: Petronas Grand Prix of Malaysia
- Location: Petronas Sepang International Circuit; Sepang, Selangor, Malaysia
- Course: Permanent racing facility; 5.543 km (3.444 mi)

MotoGP
Pole position
Rider	(Italy) Francesco Bagnaia	Ducati
Time	1:56.337	
Fastest lap
Rider	(Italy) Francesco Bagnaia	Ducati
Time	1:59.118 on lap 5	
Podium
First	(Italy) Francesco Bagnaia	Ducati
Second	(Spain) Jorge Martín	Ducati
Third	(Italy) Enea Bastianini	Ducati

Moto2
Pole position
Rider	(Spain) Jorge Navarro	Kalex
Time	2:04.412	
Fastest lap
Rider	(Italy) Celestino Vietti	Kalex
Time	2:05.898 on lap 2	
Podium
First	(Italy) Celestino Vietti	Kalex
Second	(Spain) Jorge Navarro	Kalex
Third	(Spain) Izan Guevara	Kalex

Moto3
Pole position
Rider	(Spain) Adrián Fernández	Honda
Time	2:09.542	
Fastest lap
Rider	(Colombia) David Alonso	CFMoto
Time	2:11.047 on lap 4	
Podium
First	(Colombia) David Alonso	CFMoto
Second	(Japan) Taiyo Furusato	Honda
Third	(Spain) José Antonio Rueda	KTM

The 2024 Malaysian motorcycle Grand Prix (officially known as the Petronas Grand Prix of Malaysia) was the nineteenth round of the 2024 Grand Prix motorcycle racing season. It was held at the Petronas Sepang International Circuit in Sepang on 3 November 2024.

After Celestino Vietti's win in the Moto2 class, Kalex secured its twelfth straight Constructors' Championship.

== MotoGP Sprint ==
The MotoGP Sprint was held on 2 November.

Pos.	No.	Rider	Team	Constructor	Laps	Time/Retired	Grid	Points
1	89	(Spain) Jorge Martín	Prima Pramac Racing	Ducati	10	19:49.230	2	12
2	93	(Spain) Marc Márquez	Gresini Racing MotoGP	Ducati	10	+0.913	5	9
3	23	(Italy) Enea Bastianini	Ducati Lenovo Team	Ducati	10	+2.010	6	7
4	73	(Spain) Álex Márquez	Gresini Racing MotoGP	Ducati	10	+6.575	3	6
5	20	(France) Fabio Quartararo	Monster Energy Yamaha MotoGP Team	Yamaha	10	+7.917	8	5
6	21	(Italy) Franco Morbidelli	Prima Pramac Racing	Ducati	10	+8.957	4	4
7	33	(South Africa) Brad Binder	Red Bull KTM Factory Racing	KTM	10	+11.015	10	3
8	43	(Australia) Jack Miller	Red Bull KTM Factory Racing	KTM	10	+11.834	7	2
9	31	(Spain) Pedro Acosta	Red Bull GasGas Tech3	KTM	10	+12.091	13	1
10	72	(Italy) Marco Bezzecchi	Pertamina Enduro VR46 Racing Team	Ducati	10	+12.840	14	
11	42	(Spain) Álex Rins	Monster Energy Yamaha MotoGP Team	Yamaha	10	+14.901	9	
12	41	(Spain) Aleix Espargaró	Aprilia Racing	Aprilia	10	+15.224	16	
13	37	(Spain) Augusto Fernández	Red Bull GasGas Tech3	KTM	10	+17.115	21	
14	12	(Spain) Maverick Viñales	Aprilia Racing	Aprilia	10	+18.603	12	
15	10	(Italy) Luca Marini	Repsol Honda Team	Honda	10	+19.090	19	
16	36	(Spain) Joan Mir	Repsol Honda Team	Honda	10	+20.204	20	
17	30	(Japan) Takaaki Nakagami	Idemitsu Honda LCR	Honda	10	+21.711	18	
18	25	(Spain) Raúl Fernández	Trackhouse Racing	Aprilia	10	+23.814	15	
19	29	(Italy) Andrea Iannone	Pertamina Enduro VR46 Racing Team	Ducati	10	+25.898	17	
20	32	(Italy) Lorenzo Savadori	Trackhouse Racing	Aprilia	10	+29.778	22	
Ret	5	(France) Johann Zarco	Castrol Honda LCR	Honda	7	Engine	11	
Ret	1	(Italy) Francesco Bagnaia	Ducati Lenovo Team	Ducati	2	Accident	1	
Fastest lap: (Spain) Jorge Martín (Ducati) – 1:57.805 (lap 3)
OFFICIAL MOTOGP SPRINT REPORT

== Race ==
=== MotoGP ===
The race, scheduled to be run for 20 laps, was red-flagged after the first lap due to an accident involving Jack Miller, Brad Binder and Fabio Quartararo. The race was later restarted over 19 laps.

Pos.	No.	Rider	Team	Constructor	Laps	Time/Retired	Grid	Points
1	1	(Italy) Francesco Bagnaia	Ducati Lenovo Team	Ducati	19	38:04.563	1	25
2	89	(Spain) Jorge Martín	Prima Pramac Racing	Ducati	19	+3.141	2	20
3	23	(Italy) Enea Bastianini	Ducati Lenovo Team	Ducati	19	+10.484	6	16
4	73	(Spain) Álex Márquez	Gresini Racing MotoGP	Ducati	19	+12.230	3	13
5	31	(Spain) Pedro Acosta	Red Bull GasGas Tech3	KTM	19	+13.699	13	11
6	20	(France) Fabio Quartararo	Monster Energy Yamaha MotoGP Team	Yamaha	19	+16.245	8	10
7	12	(Spain) Maverick Viñales	Aprilia Racing	Aprilia	19	+19.447	12	9
8	42	(Spain) Álex Rins	Monster Energy Yamaha MotoGP Team	Yamaha	19	+20.611	9	8
9	72	(Italy) Marco Bezzecchi	Pertamina Enduro VR46 Racing Team	Ducati	19	+21.994	14	7
10	37	(Spain) Augusto Fernández	Red Bull GasGas Tech3	KTM	19	+22.174	21	6
11	5	(France) Johann Zarco	Castrol Honda LCR	Honda	19	+25.625	11	5
12	93	(Spain) Marc Márquez	Gresini Racing MotoGP	Ducati	19	+27.276	5	4
13	41	(Spain) Aleix Espargaró	Aprilia Racing	Aprilia	19	+27.604	16	3
14	21	(Italy) Franco Morbidelli	Prima Pramac Racing	Ducati	19	+27.949	4	2
15	10	(Italy) Luca Marini	Repsol Honda Team	Honda	19	+28.838	19	1
16	25	(Spain) Raúl Fernández	Trackhouse Racing	Aprilia	19	+38.847	15	
17	29	(Italy) Andrea Iannone	Pertamina Enduro VR46 Racing Team	Ducati	19	+47.599	17	
18	32	(Italy) Lorenzo Savadori	Trackhouse Racing	Aprilia	19	+48.956	22	
Ret	30	(Japan) Takaaki Nakagami	Idemitsu Honda LCR	Honda	14	Retired	18	
Ret	36	(Spain) Joan Mir	Repsol Honda Team	Honda	5	Crashed	20	
DNS	33	(South Africa) Brad Binder	Red Bull KTM Factory Racing	KTM	0	Did not restart	10	
DNS	43	(Australia) Jack Miller	Red Bull KTM Factory Racing	KTM	0	Did not restart	7	
Fastest lap: (Italy) Francesco Bagnaia (Ducati) – 1:59.118 (lap 5)
OFFICIAL MOTOGP RACE REPORT

== Championship standings after the race ==
Below are the standings for the top five riders, constructors, and teams after the round.

=== MotoGP ===
Riders' Championship standings

	Pos.	Rider	Points
	1	(Spain) Jorge Martín	485
	2	(Italy) Francesco Bagnaia	461
	3	(Spain) Marc Márquez	369
	4	(Italy) Enea Bastianini	368
1	5	(Spain) Pedro Acosta	209

Constructors' Championship standings

Pos.	Constructor	Points
1	(Italy) Ducati	685
2	(Austria) KTM	316
3	(Italy) Aprilia	285
4	(Japan) Yamaha	119
5	(Japan) Honda	73

Teams' Championship standings

Pos.	Team	Points
1	(Italy) Ducati Lenovo Team	829
2	(Italy) Prima Pramac Racing	646
3	(Italy) Gresini Racing MotoGP	524
4	(Italy) Aprilia Racing	335
5	(Italy) Pertamina Enduro VR46 Racing Team	309

=== Moto2 ===
Riders' Championship standings

Pos.	Rider	Points
1	(Japan) Ai Ogura	261
2	(Spain) Arón Canet	209
3	(Spain) Sergio García	181
4	(Spain) Fermín Aldeguer	175
5	(Spain) Manuel González	175

Constructors' Championship standings

Pos.	Constructor	Points
1	(Germany) Kalex	412
2	(Italy) Boscoscuro	376
3	(Switzerland) Forward	16

Teams' Championship standings

	Pos.	Team	Points
	1	(Spain) MT Helmets – MSi	442
	2	(Italy) Sync Speed Up	346
	3	(United States) OnlyFans American Racing Team	285
	4	(Italy) Gresini Moto2	255
2	5	(Spain) CFMoto RCB Aspar Team	215

=== Moto3 ===
Riders' Championship standings

Pos.	Rider	Points
1	(Colombia) David Alonso	396
2	(Spain) Daniel Holgado	236
3	(Netherlands) Collin Veijer	236
4	(Spain) Iván Ortolá	217
5	(Spain) David Muñoz	162

Constructors' Championship standings

Pos.	Constructor	Points
1	(China) CFMoto	396
2	(Austria) KTM	320
3	(Japan) Honda	284
4	(Sweden) Husqvarna	263
5	(Spain) Gas Gas	245

Teams' Championship standings

	Pos.	Team	Points
	1	(Spain) CFMoto Gaviota Aspar Team	441
	2	(Spain) MT Helmets – MSi	337
	3	(Germany) Liqui Moly Husqvarna Intact GP	324
2	4	(Spain) Boé Motorsports	296
1	5	(France) Red Bull GasGas Tech3	294

Previous race: 2024 Thailand Grand Prix	FIM Grand Prix World Championship; 2024 season	Next race: 2024 Solidarity Grand Prix
Previous race: 2023 Malaysian Grand Prix	Malaysian motorcycle Grand Prix	Next race: 2025 Malaysian Grand Prix
