= 2022 Moto3 World Championship =

11th running of the Moto3 World Championship

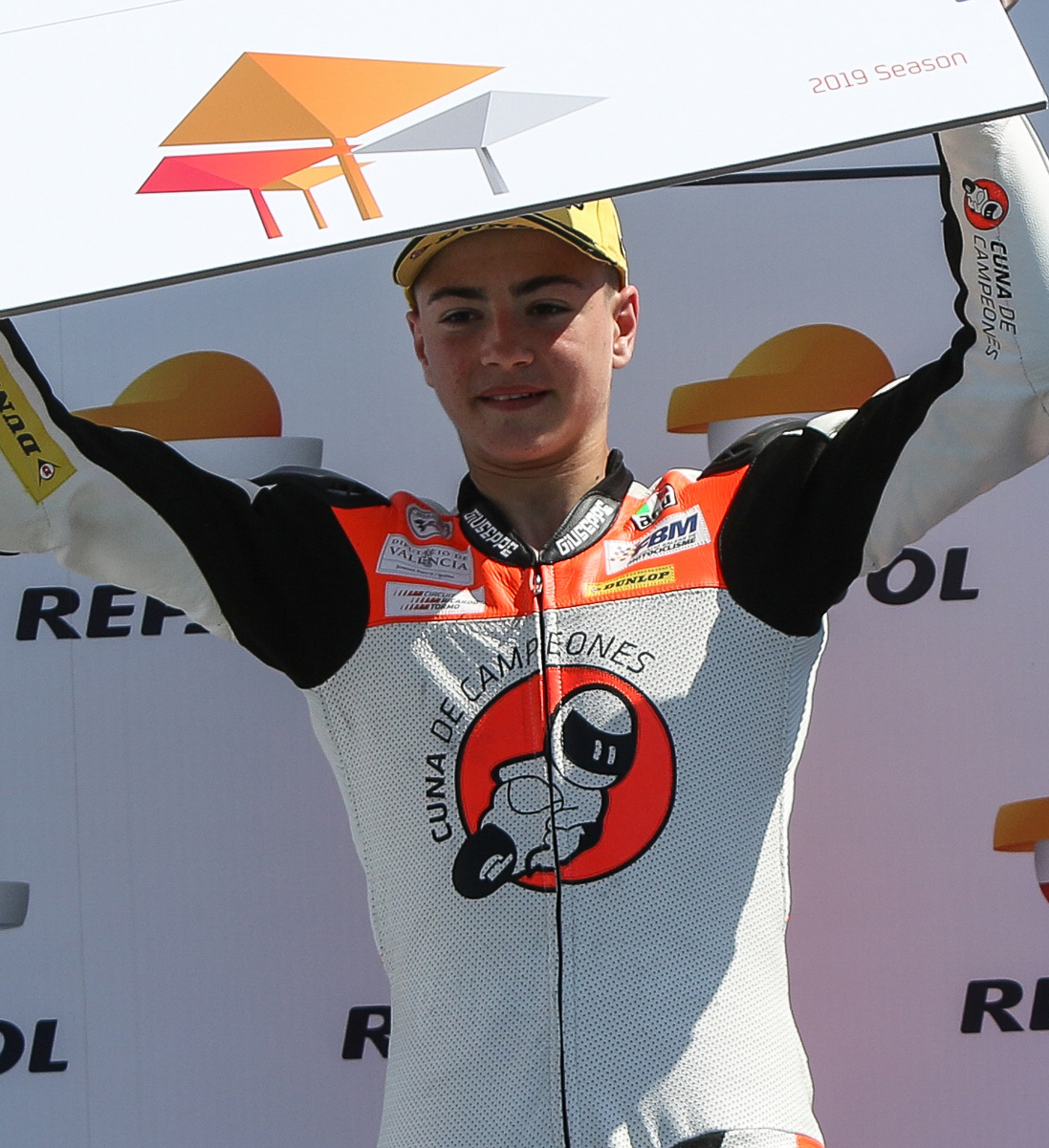
Izan Guevara (pictured in 2019) was the 2022 Moto3 World Riders' Champion.

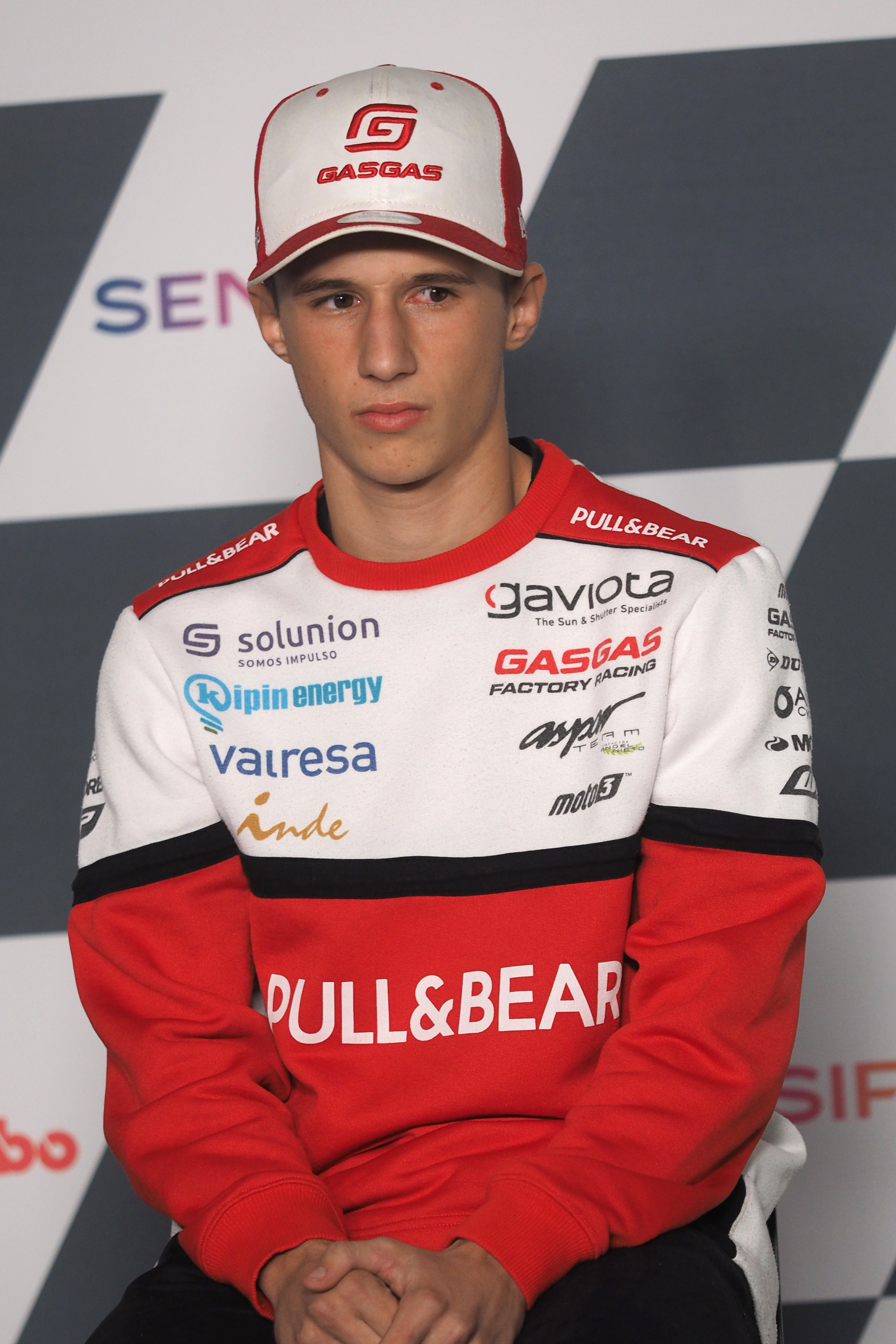
Sergio García (pictured in 2021) finished runner-up.

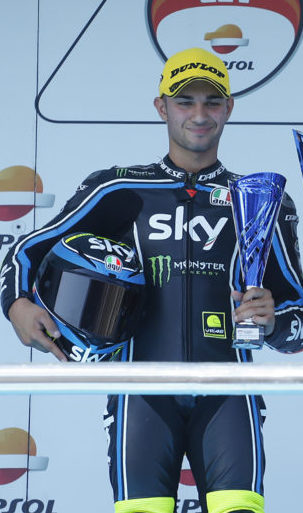
Dennis Foggia (pictured in 2017) finished third.

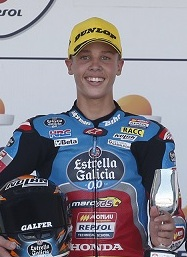
Diogo Moreira (pictured in 2019), the 2022 Moto3 Rookie of the Year.

The 2022 FIM Moto3 World Championship was the lightweight class of the 74th Fédération Internationale de Motocyclisme (FIM) Road Racing World Championship season. Izan Guevara won the championship for GasGas Aspar Team after the Australian Grand Prix.

== Teams and riders ==
Team	Constructor	Motorcycle	No.	Rider	Rounds
(Germany) CFMoto Racing Prüstel GP	CFMoto	Moto3	43	(Spain) Xavier Artigas	All
(Germany) CFMoto Racing Prüstel GP	CFMoto	Moto3	99	(Spain) Carlos Tatay	All
(Spain) GasGas Aspar Team (Note: This is the team name entered in the championship. Other team names used during the season are Gaviota GasGas Aspar Team (rounds 1–2, 4, 6–7, 12, 14, 17–19), Solunion GasGas Aspar Team (round 3), Valresa GasGas Aspar Team (round 5, 8–9, 20), and AutoSolar GasGas Aspar Team (round 13, 15–16).)	GasGas	RC250GP	11	(Spain) Sergio García	All
(Spain) GasGas Aspar Team	GasGas	RC250GP	28	(Spain) Izan Guevara	All
(Spain) GasGas Aspar Team	GasGas	RC250GP	80	(Colombia) David Alonso	5
(Spain) GasGas Aspar Team	GasGas	RC250GP	77	(Italy) Filippo Farioli	20
(Japan) Honda Team Asia	Honda	NSF250RW	64	(Indonesia) Mario Aji	All
(Japan) Honda Team Asia	Honda	NSF250RW	72	(Japan) Taiyo Furusato	3–20
(Luxembourg) Leopard Racing	Honda	NSF250RW	7	(Italy) Dennis Foggia	All
(Luxembourg) Leopard Racing	Honda	NSF250RW	24	(Japan) Tatsuki Suzuki	All
(Italy) Rivacold Snipers Team	Honda	NSF250RW	16	(Italy) Andrea Migno	All
(Italy) Rivacold Snipers Team	Honda	NSF250RW	67	(Italy) Alberto Surra	1–4, 8, 10–15, 18–20
(Italy) Rivacold Snipers Team	Honda	NSF250RW	63	(Malaysia) Syarifuddin Azman	5–6
(Italy) Rivacold Snipers Team	Honda	NSF250RW	98	(Spain) José Antonio Rueda	7
(Italy) Rivacold Snipers Team	Honda	NSF250RW	89	(Spain) Marcos Uriarte	9
(Italy) Rivacold Snipers Team	Honda	NSF250RW	34	(Japan) Kanta Hamada	16
(Italy) Rivacold Snipers Team	Honda	NSF250RW	21	(Spain) Vicente Pérez	17
(Italy) Sic58 Squadra Corse	Honda	NSF250RW	20	(France) Lorenzo Fellon	All
(Italy) Sic58 Squadra Corse	Honda	NSF250RW	54	(Italy) Riccardo Rossi	All
(Italy) Sic58 Squadra Corse	Honda	NSF250RW	29	(Australia) Harrison Voight	14
(United Kingdom) VisionTrack Racing Team	Honda	NSF250RW	19	(United Kingdom) Scott Ogden	All
(United Kingdom) VisionTrack Racing Team	Honda	NSF250RW	70	(United Kingdom) Joshua Whatley	All
(United Kingdom) VisionTrack Racing Team	Honda	NSF250RW	63	(Malaysia) Syarifuddin Azman	9, 19
(Italy) Sterilgarda Husqvarna Max	Husqvarna	FR250GP	17	(United Kingdom) John McPhee	1, 7–20
(Italy) Sterilgarda Husqvarna Max	Husqvarna	FR250GP	38	(Spain) David Salvador	4–6
(Italy) Sterilgarda Husqvarna Max	Husqvarna	FR250GP	71	(Japan) Ayumu Sasaki	1–8, 10–20
(Italy) Sterilgarda Husqvarna Max	Husqvarna	FR250GP	38	(Spain) David Salvador	9
(Italy) Angeluss MTA Team	KTM	RC250GP	48	(Spain) Iván Ortolá	All
(Italy) Angeluss MTA Team	KTM	RC250GP	82	(Italy) Stefano Nepa	1–19
(Italy) Angeluss MTA Team	KTM	RC250GP	38	(Spain) David Salvador	20
(Italy) Angeluss MTA Team	KTM	RC250GP	69	(Spain) María Herrera	15
(Spain) Boé Motorsports (Note: From rounds 1–8, the team used the team name Boé SKX.) (Spain) Finetwork Team Boé Motorsports	KTM	RC250GP	22	(Spain) Ana Carrasco	All
(Spain) Boé Motorsports (Spain) Finetwork Team Boé Motorsports	KTM	RC250GP	44	(Spain) David Muñoz	8–20
(Spain) Boé Motorsports (Spain) Finetwork Team Boé Motorsports	KTM	RC250GP	87	(Spain) Gerard Riu	1–7
(Spain) Boé Motorsports (Spain) Finetwork Team Boé Motorsports	KTM	RC250GP	95	(Spain) David Almansa	20
(France) CIP Green Power	KTM	RC250GP	27	(Japan) Kaito Toba	All
(France) CIP Green Power	KTM	RC250GP	66	(Australia) Joel Kelso	1–11, 13–20
(France) CIP Green Power	KTM	RC250GP	41	(Spain) Marc García	12
(Spain) MT Helmets – MSi	KTM	RC250GP	6	(Japan) Ryusei Yamanaka	All
(Spain) MT Helmets – MSi	KTM	RC250GP	10	(Brazil) Diogo Moreira	All
(Spain) MT Helmets – MSi	KTM	RC250GP	91	(Italy) Alessandro Morosi	15
(Spain) QJmotor Avintia Racing Team	KTM	RC250GP	18	(Italy) Matteo Bertelle	1–10
(Spain) QJmotor Avintia Racing Team	KTM	RC250GP	85	(Italy) Luca Lunetta	11
(Spain) QJmotor Avintia Racing Team	KTM	RC250GP	9	(Italy) Nicola Carraro	12–20
(Spain) QJmotor Avintia Racing Team	KTM	RC250GP	23	(Italy) Elia Bartolini	All
(Finland) Red Bull KTM Ajo	KTM	RC250GP	5	(Spain) Jaume Masià	All
(Finland) Red Bull KTM Ajo	KTM	RC250GP	96	(Spain) Daniel Holgado	All
(France) Red Bull KTM Tech3	KTM	RC250GP	31	(Spain) Adrián Fernández	All
(France) Red Bull KTM Tech3	KTM	RC250GP	53	(Turkey) Deniz Öncü	All

Key
Regular rider
Replacement rider
Wildcard rider

All teams used series-specified Dunlop tyres.

=== Team changes ===
- Petronas Sprinta Racing withdrew from the category at the end of the 2021 season following the loss of their sponsor. The team continued under the same management and different sponsor in the MotoGP class.
- A new British team, run by former rider Michael Laverty, joined the championship with the aim of providing British riders with a stepping stone into the world championship starting from the British Talent Cup which was established in 2018. The team was sponsored by VisionTrack and the team took over the Honda bikes vacated by the Petronas SRT team.
- Gresini Racing, who have competed from 2012 until 2021, left the championship to focus on their Moto2 and MotoGP teams.
- Team MTA, which has competed in the CIV since 2017 and the CEV since 2019, made their return to the Moto3 World Championship with KTM. The team previously competed in the Moto3 World Championship from 2014 to 2016 as "Team Italia", using Mahindra bikes.
- Prüstel GP switched from actual KTM machines to CFMoto-rebranded KTM bikes.
- MT Helmets – MSi entered the championship as a new team.

=== Rider changes ===
- Reigning Moto3 Riders' Champion Pedro Acosta moved up to Moto2 still remaining with Red Bull KTM Ajo.
- Romano Fenati moved up to Moto2 a second time, joining Speed Up Racing.
- Niccolò Antonelli was promoted to Moto2 with the same team.
- Tatsuki Suzuki left Sic58 Squadra Corse and joined Leopard Racing, replacing Xavier Artigas.
- Iván Ortolá made his debut with Team MTA. He was joined by Stefano Nepa, who moved from Boé Owlride.
- Joel Kelso made his full-time debut with CIP Green Power, replacing Maximilian Kofler. Kelso has served as a replacement rider in 2021 and raced in the 2021 CEV Moto3 Junior World Championship.
- VisionTrack Racing Team signed Joshua Whatley and Scott Ogden for the 2022 campaign.
- Alberto Surra made his full-time Moto3 debut with Rivacold Snipers Team. Surra has served as both a wildcard and a replacement rider in 2021.
- David Muñoz made his debut with Boé SKX. He previously raced in the 2021 CEV Moto3 Junior World Championship and 2021 Red Bull MotoGP Rookies Cup.
- John McPhee moved from the withdrawn Petronas Sprinta Racing to Sterilgarda Max Racing Team. He teamed up with Ayumu Sasaki, who moved from Red Bull KTM Tech3. They both replaced Romano Fenati and Adrián Fernández.
- Elia Bartolini and Matteo Bertelle both made their full-time debuts with Avintia VR46 Riders Academy. Bartolini has served as both a wildcard and a replacement rider in 2021, while Bertelle has appeared as a wildcard in 2021 and raced in the 2021 Red Bull MotoGP Rookies Cup. They replaced Carlos Tatay and Niccolò Antonelli.
- Carlos Tatay and Xavier Artigas both moved to Prüstel GP. Tatay previously raced with Avintia Esponsorama, while Artigas previously raced with Leopard Racing in 2021. They replaced Ryusei Yamanaka and Filip Salač.
- Ryusei Yamanaka subsequently moved to the newly formed MT Helmets – MSi.
- Originally, Daniel Holgado was scheduled to make his debut with Red Bull KTM Tech3, teaming up with Deniz Öncü. However, it was subsequently announced that Holgado will join Red Bull KTM Ajo instead, where he would team up with Jaume Masià. Holgado has served as a replacement rider in 2021 and raced in both the 2021 CEV Moto3 Junior World Championship, where he won the championship, and 2021 Red Bull MotoGP Rookies Cup. Adrián Fernández took Holgado's entry at Tech3.
- Mario Aji and Taiyo Furusato both made their full-time debuts with Honda Team Asia. Aji has appeared as a wildcard rider in 2021 and raced in the 2021 CEV Moto3 Junior World Championship, while Furusato raced in the Asia Talent Cup. Both have also raced in the 2021 Red Bull MotoGP Rookies Cup.
- Diogo Moreira made his full-time debut with MT Helmets – MSi. He raced in both the 2021 Red Bull MotoGP Rookies Cup and 2021 CEV Moto3 Junior World Championship.
- Riccardo Rossi left Boé SKX and join Sic58 Squadra Corse, replacing Tatsuki Suzuki.
- Ana Carrasco made her return to Moto3 after racing the last five seasons in Supersport 300 World Championship, winning the 2018 title. She teamed up with David Muñoz at Boé SKX and replaced David Salvador who was initially signed to partner Muñoz.

==== Mid-season changes ====
- Gerard Riu replaced David Muñoz for the first seven rounds due to Muñoz being under the minimum age.
- Taiyo Furusato missed the Qatar and Indonesian rounds after having surgery due to a right ankle injury. He was not replaced for both races.
- John McPhee missed the Indonesian, Argentine, Americas, Portuguese, and Spanish rounds after sustaining two fractured vertebrae during training. He was not replaced for the first two races, but was replaced by David Salvador for the next three races.
- Alberto Surra missed three races due to a right hand injury sustained in a FP3 crash during the Americas round. He was replaced by Syarifuddin Azman for the Portuguese and Spanish rounds, while José Antonio Rueda replaced him for the French round He returned during the Italian round, but suffered a fractured foot during FP3. He was replaced by Marcos Uriarte for the succeeding Catalan round. Surra also missed the Japanese round after sustaining a fractured right hand in a FP3 crash during the previous Aragon round. He was replaced by Kanta Hamada.
- Ayumu Sasaki missed the Catalan round after suffering an injury during the previous Italian round. He was replaced by David Salvador.
- Matteo Bertelle missed the Dutch round after suffering a left knee injury during the main race of the previous German round. He was replaced by Luca Lunetta. Bertelle underwent a season-ending surgery during the summer break and was replaced by Nicola Carraro for the rest of the season.
- Joel Kelso missed the British round after suffering an injury during the previous Dutch round. He was replaced by Marc García.
- Stefano Nepa missed the Valencian round after undergoing surgery to an injury suffered during the previous Malaysian round. He was replaced by David Salvador.

== Calendar ==
The following Grands Prix took place in 2022:

Round	Date	Grand Prix	Circuit
1	6 March (Note: Night race)	Grand Prix of Qatar	Lusail International Circuit, Lusail
2	20 March	Pertamina Grand Prix of Indonesia	Mandalika International Street Circuit, Mandalika
3	3 April	Gran Premio Michelin de la República Argentina	Autódromo Termas de Río Hondo, Termas de Río Hondo
4	10 April	(United States) Red Bull Grand Prix of The Americas	Circuit of the Americas, Austin
5	24 April	Grande Prémio Tissot de Portugal	Algarve International Circuit, Portimão
6	1 May	(Spain) Gran Premio Red Bull de España	Circuito de Jerez, Jerez de la Frontera
7	15 May	Shark Grand Prix de France	Bugatti Circuit, Le Mans
8	29 May	(Italy) Gran Premio d'Italia Oakley	Mugello Circuit, Scarperia e San Piero
9	5 June	(Catalonia) Gran Premi Monster Energy de Catalunya	Circuit de Barcelona-Catalunya, Montmeló
10	19 June	(Germany) Liqui Moly Motorrad Grand Prix Deutschland	Sachsenring, Hohenstein-Ernstthal
11	26 June	(Netherlands) Motul TT Assen	TT Circuit Assen, Assen
12	7 August	(United Kingdom) Monster Energy British Grand Prix	Silverstone Circuit, Silverstone
13	21 August	(Austria) CryptoData Motorrad Grand Prix von Österreich	Red Bull Ring, Spielberg
14	4 September	Gran Premio Gryfyn di San Marino e della Riviera di Rimini	Misano World Circuit, Misano Adriatico
15	18 September	(Aragon) Gran Premio Animoca Brands de Aragón	MotorLand Aragón, Alcañiz
16	25 September	Motul Grand Prix of Japan	Motegi Circuit, Motegi
17	2 October	OR Thailand Grand Prix	Buriram International Circuit, Buriram
18	16 October	(Australia) Animoca Brands Australian Motorcycle Grand Prix	Phillip Island Grand Prix Circuit, Phillip Island
19	23 October	Petronas Grand Prix of Malaysia	Sepang International Circuit, Sepang
20	6 November	(Valencian Community) Gran Premio Motul de la Comunitat Valenciana	Circuit Ricardo Tormo, Valencia
Cancelled Grand Prix
–	~~10 July~~	(Finland) Finnish motorcycle Grand Prix	Kymi Ring, Iitti

=== Grand Prix locations ===
Location of non-European Grands Prix in 2022.
Location of European Grands Prix in 2022.
(scheduled Grand Prix: cancelled Grand Prix)

=== Calendar changes ===
Comparison between the configuration of the Red Bull Ring used from 2016 to 2021 (top), and the layout used starting 2022 (bottom).
- Cancelled Grands Prix in 2021 as a response to the COVID-19 pandemic, namely the Argentine, Finnish, Japanese, Thailand, Australian, and Malaysian Grands Prix, returned in 2022. Consequently, the Grands Prix held in 2021 that replaced the aforementioned cancelled races, namely the Doha, Styrian, Emilia Romagna, and Algarve Grands Prix, did not return in 2022.
- The previously mentioned Finnish Grand Prix was planned to return to the calendar after a 39-year absence. The venue hosting the round would have been the new Kymi Ring, instead of the Pyynikki Circuit used in 1962 and 1963 or the Imatra Circuit which hosted the round until 1982. The Grand Prix was included on both the 2020 and 2021 calendars, but both races were cancelled in response to the COVID-19 pandemic. However, the race scheduled for July was cancelled in May due to incomplete homologation works and the risks associated with the geopolitical situation in the region.
- The Indonesian Grand Prix returned to the calendar after a 24-year absence. The venue hosting the round was the new Mandalika International Street Circuit, instead of the Sentul International Circuit used in 1996 and 1997. The Grand Prix had been included in the 2021 calendar as a Reserve Grand Prix but was ultimately dropped before the end of the season.
- The Brazilian Grand Prix, which had previously been announced to return in 2022, was not included in the provisional calendar released on 7 October 2021.
- The Austrian Grand Prix used a new layout of the Red Bull Ring, wherein a chicane was added to the previous fast slight-left hander of turn 2. This was done to improve the overall safety of the track by greatly reducing the speed the riders take the turn. The final configuration was chosen among 15 proposals, with the track being 30 meters longer than the previous configurations.

== Results and standings ==
=== Grands Prix ===
Round	Grand Prix	Pole position	Fastest lap	Winning rider	Winning team	Winning constructor	Report
1	Qatar motorcycle Grand Prix	(Spain) Izan Guevara (Note: Guevara, who set the fastest time during qualifying, was penalized for irresponsible riding during the second qualifying session. He started the race from the back of the grid, but he is still credited with the pole position. Ayumu Sasaki was promoted to the pole position grid slot during the race.)	(Italy) Dennis Foggia	(Italy) Andrea Migno	(Italy) Rivacold Snipers Team	(Japan) Honda	Report
2	(Indonesia) Indonesian motorcycle Grand Prix	(Spain) Carlos Tatay	(Spain) Jaume Masià	(Italy) Dennis Foggia	(Luxembourg) Leopard Racing	(Japan) Honda	Report
3	(Argentina) Argentine Republic motorcycle Grand Prix	(Spain) Sergio García	(Italy) Andrea Migno	(Spain) Sergio García	(Spain) Solunion GasGas Aspar Team	(Spain) GasGas	Report
4	(United States) Motorcycle Grand Prix of the Americas	(Italy) Andrea Migno	(Spain) Jaume Masià	(Spain) Jaume Masià	(Finland) Red Bull KTM Ajo	(Austria) KTM	Report
5	(Portugal) Portuguese motorcycle Grand Prix	(Turkey) Deniz Öncü	(Spain) Jaume Masià	(Spain) Sergio García	(Spain) Valresa GasGas Aspar Team	(Spain) GasGas	Report
6	(Spain) Spanish motorcycle Grand Prix	(Spain) Izan Guevara	(Spain) Izan Guevara	(Spain) Izan Guevara	(Spain) Gaviota GasGas Aspar Team	(Spain) GasGas	Report
7	(France) French motorcycle Grand Prix	(Italy) Dennis Foggia	(Spain) Izan Guevara	(Spain) Jaume Masià	(Finland) Red Bull KTM Ajo	(Austria) KTM	Report
8	(Italy) Italian motorcycle Grand Prix	(Turkey) Deniz Öncü	(Italy) Riccardo Rossi	(Spain) Sergio García	(Spain) Valresa GasGas Aspar Team	(Spain) GasGas	Report
9	(Catalonia) Catalan motorcycle Grand Prix	(Italy) Dennis Foggia	(Spain) Jaume Masià	(Spain) Izan Guevara	(Spain) Valresa GasGas Aspar Team	(Spain) GasGas	Report
10	(Germany) German motorcycle Grand Prix	(Spain) Izan Guevara	(Turkey) Deniz Öncü	(Spain) Izan Guevara	(Spain) GasGas Aspar Team	(Spain) GasGas	Report
11	(Netherlands) Dutch TT	(Japan) Ayumu Sasaki	(United Kingdom) John McPhee	(Japan) Ayumu Sasaki	(Italy) Sterilgarda Husqvarna Max	(Sweden) Husqvarna	Report
12	(United Kingdom) British motorcycle Grand Prix	(Brazil) Diogo Moreira	(Turkey) Deniz Öncü	(Italy) Dennis Foggia	(Luxembourg) Leopard Racing	(Japan) Honda	Report
13	(Austria) Austrian motorcycle Grand Prix	(Spain) Daniel Holgado	(Spain) David Muñoz	(Japan) Ayumu Sasaki	(Italy) Sterilgarda Husqvarna Max	(Sweden) Husqvarna	Report
14	San Marino and Rimini Riviera motorcycle Grand Prix	(Turkey) Deniz Öncü	(Italy) Dennis Foggia	(Italy) Dennis Foggia	(Luxembourg) Leopard Racing	(Japan) Honda	Report
15	Aragon motorcycle Grand Prix	(Spain) Izan Guevara	(Turkey) Deniz Öncü	(Spain) Izan Guevara	(Spain) AutoSolar GasGas Aspar Team	(Spain) GasGas	Report
16	(Japan) Japanese motorcycle Grand Prix	(Japan) Tatsuki Suzuki	(Spain) Jaume Masià	(Spain) Izan Guevara	(Spain) AutoSolar GasGas Aspar Team	(Spain) GasGas	Report
17	Thailand motorcycle Grand Prix	(Italy) Dennis Foggia	(Spain) Jaume Masià	(Italy) Dennis Foggia	(Luxembourg) Leopard Racing	(Japan) Honda	Report
18	(Australia) Australian motorcycle Grand Prix	(Japan) Ayumu Sasaki	(United Kingdom) John McPhee	(Spain) Izan Guevara	(Spain) Gaviota GasGas Aspar Team	(Spain) GasGas	Report
19	(Malaysia) Malaysian motorcycle Grand Prix	(Italy) Dennis Foggia	(Japan) Ayumu Sasaki	(United Kingdom) John McPhee	(Italy) Sterilgarda Husqvarna Max	(Sweden) Husqvarna	Report
20	Valencian Community motorcycle Grand Prix	(Spain) Izan Guevara	(Turkey) Deniz Öncü	(Spain) Izan Guevara	(Spain) Valresa GasGas Aspar Team	(Spain) GasGas	Report

=== Riders' standings ===
Scoring system

Points were awarded to the top fifteen finishers. A rider had to finish the race to earn points.

Position	1st	2nd	3rd	4th	5th	6th	7th	8th	9th	10th	11th	12th	13th	14th	15th
Points	25	20	16	13	11	10	9	8	7	6	5	4	3	2	1

Pos.	Rider	Bike	Team	QAT (Qatar)	INA (Indonesia)	ARG (Argentina)	AME (United States)	POR (Portugal)	SPA (Spain)	FRA (France)	ITA (Italy)	CAT (Catalonia)	GER (Germany)	NED (Netherlands)	GBR (United Kingdom)	AUT (Austria)	RSM (San Marino)	ARA (Aragon)	JPN (Japan)	THA (Thailand)	AUS (Australia)	MAL (Malaysia)	VAL (Valencian Community)	Pts
1	(Spain) Izan Guevara	GasGas	GasGas Aspar Team	8^{P}	2	Ret	7	5	1^{P F}	3^{F}	2	1	1^{P}	2	Ret	7	3	1^{P}	1	5	1	12	1^{P}	319
2	(Spain) Sergio García	GasGas	GasGas Aspar Team	2	4	1^{P}	Ret	1	2	7	1	4	3	3	Ret	5	DSQ	13	4	Ret	3	3	3	257
3	(Italy) Dennis Foggia	Honda	Leopard Racing	7^{F}	1	2	2	8	18	4^{P}	Ret	Ret^{P}	2	Ret	1	12	1^{F}	14	2	1^{P}	9	6^{P}	4	246
4	(Japan) Ayumu Sasaki	Husqvarna	Sterilgarda Husqvarna Max	Ret	Ret	3	4	3	6	2	DNS		4	1^{P}	Ret	1	Ret	2	3	2	4^{P}	2^{F}	5	238
5	(Turkey) Deniz Öncü	KTM	Red Bull KTM Tech3	4	5	14	5	4^{P}	4	9	15^{P}	5	7^{F}	9	3^{F}	4	4^{P}	4^{F}	15	17	2	10	2^{F}	200
6	(Spain) Jaume Masià	KTM	Red Bull KTM Ajo	Ret	7^{F}	Ret	1^{F}	2^{F}	3	1	17	8^{F}	12	Ret	2	18	2	8	Ret^{F}	8^{F}	15	4	22	177
7	(Japan) Tatsuki Suzuki	Honda	Leopard Racing	Ret	10	5	10	12	Ret	5	3	3	5	4	Ret	2	6	12	Ret^{P}	Ret	Ret	Ret	14	130
8	(Brazil) Diogo Moreira	KTM	MT Helmets – MSi	6	Ret	6	Ret	10	10	14	Ret	DNS	16	16	6^{P}	6	7	15	6	6	7	5	8	112
9	(Italy) Andrea Migno	Honda	Rivacold Snipers Team	1	Ret	Ret^{F}	3^{P}	7	14	10	4	Ret	11	15	9	23	Ret	18	9	7	16	14	15	103
10	(Spain) Daniel Holgado	KTM	Red Bull KTM Ajo	16	9	7	Ret	Ret	9	11	Ret	Ret	6	6	NC	8^{P}	5	3	Ret	11	Ret	7	10	103
11	(United Kingdom) John McPhee	Husqvarna	Sterilgarda Husqvarna Max	5						12	Ret	7	19	Ret^{F}	7	9	9	10	7	Ret	6^{F}	1	11	102
12	(Japan) Ryusei Yamanaka	KTM	MT Helmets – MSi	9	11	12	17	21	8	8	5	21	Ret	8	8	13	13	Ret	8	10	Ret	8	9	94
13	(Spain) David Muñoz	KTM	Boé Motorsports								11	2	9	Ret	Ret	3^{F}	12	7	5	9	11	Ret	7	93
14	(Italy) Riccardo Rossi	Honda	Sic58 Squadra Corse	12	17	4	9	11	Ret	13	6^{F}	11	Ret	11	14	19	11	16	10	3	10	Ret	Ret	87
15	(Spain) Carlos Tatay	CFMoto	CFMoto Racing Prüstel GP	Ret	3^{P}	8	8	6	Ret	6	19	6	Ret	14	10	Ret	Ret	9	Ret	13	12	Ret	13	87
16	(Spain) Xavier Artigas	CFMoto	CFMoto Racing Prüstel GP	10	6	Ret	6	20	5	Ret	20	10	13	5	11	14	20	11	11	14	14	11	23	83
17	(Spain) Iván Ortolá	KTM	Angeluss MTA Team	11	Ret	15	11	Ret	13	18	7	18	10	12	Ret	11	8	6	13	20	13	9	12	73
18	(Italy) Stefano Nepa	KTM	Angeluss MTA Team	13	Ret	16	13	15	15	17	Ret	16	15	7	5	15	10	19	12	4	5	Ret		64
19	(Japan) Kaito Toba	KTM	CIP Green Power	3	12	9	Ret	17	7	15	16	15	20	10	4	10	19	23	21	Ret	17	17	24	63
20	(Spain) Adrián Fernández	KTM	Red Bull KTM Tech3	14	Ret	13	14	WD	Ret	20	10	9	8	Ret	15	17	16	5	18	Ret	18	15	6	51
21	(Australia) Joel Kelso	KTM	CIP Green Power	15	18	10	18	9	Ret	DNS	12	12	Ret	Ret		22	14	21	Ret	12	8	18	21	36
22	(Italy) Elia Bartolini	KTM	QJmotor Avintia Racing Team	18	8	11	19	19	16	16	8	17	14	Ret	16	20	15	20	16	18	20	13	17	27
23	(United Kingdom) Scott Ogden	Honda	VisionTrack Racing Team	Ret	13	Ret	12	13	12	Ret	Ret	14	Ret	Ret	12	21	25	22	20	15	Ret	Ret	Ret	21
24	(Italy) Matteo Bertelle	KTM	QJmotor Avintia Racing Team	17	15	18	Ret	18	11	19	9	13	Ret											16
25	(France) Lorenzo Fellon	Honda	Sic58 Squadra Corse	Ret	16	19	15	14	DNS	23	14	20	18	13	13	16	18	Ret	Ret	16	19	19	20	11
26	(Indonesia) Mario Aji	Honda	Honda Team Asia	19	14	21	21	16	17	22	13	Ret	23	18	17	24	Ret	24	17	21	Ret	21	27	5
27	(Japan) Taiyo Furusato	Honda	Honda Team Asia			17	16	25	21	25	18	Ret	17	21	18	25	21	17	14	25	Ret	Ret	Ret	2
28	(Malaysia) Syarifuddin Azman	Honda	Rivacold Snipers Team					24	22															0
28	(Malaysia) Syarifuddin Azman	Honda	VisionTrack Racing Team									19										16		0
29	(Italy) Nicola Carraro	KTM	QJmotor Avintia Racing Team												20	26	Ret	Ret	Ret	24	22	20	16	0
30	(Italy) Alberto Surra	Honda	Rivacold Snipers Team	Ret	Ret	20	DNS				DNS		21	17	19	27	17	DNS			24	Ret	29	0
31	(Spain) David Salvador	Husqvarna	Sterilgarda Husqvarna Max				22	22	19			Ret												0
31	(Spain) David Salvador	KTM	Angeluss MTA Team																				18	0
32	(Spain) Ana Carrasco	KTM	Boé Motorsports	20	19	Ret	23	28	23	27	22	22	22	22	23	28	22	25	19	22	23	22	28	0
33	(Italy) Filippo Farioli	GasGas	GasGas Aspar Team																				19	0
34	(Spain) Vicente Pérez	Honda	Rivacold Snipers Team																	19				0
35	(Italy) Luca Lunetta	KTM	QJmotor Avintia Racing Team											19										0
36	(United Kingdom) Joshua Whatley	Honda	VisionTrack Racing Team	22	20	23	Ret	26	WD	26	21	Ret	Ret	20	21	29	24	Ret	Ret	23	21	23	26	0
37	(Spain) Gerard Riu	KTM	Boé SKX	21	21	22	20	23	20	24														0
38	(Spain) José Antonio Rueda	Honda	Rivacold Snipers Team							21														0
39	(Spain) Marc García	KTM	CIP Green Power												22									0
40	(Australia) Harrison Voight	Honda	Sic58 Squadra Corse														23							0
41	(Spain) David Almansa	KTM	Finetwork Team Boé Motorsports																				25	0
42	(Italy) Alessandro Morosi	KTM	MT Helmets – MSi															26						0
43	(Spain) María Herrera	KTM	Angeluss MTA Team															27						0
44	(Colombia) David Alonso	GasGas	GasGas Aspar Team					27																0
	(Spain) Marcos Uriarte	Honda	Rivacold Snipers Team									Ret												0
	(Japan) Kanta Hamada	Honda	Rivacold Snipers Team																Ret					0
Pos.	Rider	Bike	Team	QAT (Qatar)	INA (Indonesia)	ARG (Argentina)	AME (United States)	POR (Portugal)	SPA (Spain)	FRA (France)	ITA (Italy)	CAT (Catalonia)	GER (Germany)	NED (Netherlands)	GBR (United Kingdom)	AUT (Austria)	RSM (San Marino)	ARA (Aragon)	JPN (Japan)	THA (Thailand)	AUS (Australia)	MAL (Malaysia)	VAL (Valencian Community)	Pts

Race key
Colour	Result
Gold	Winner
Silver	2nd place
Bronze	3rd place
Green	Points finish
Blue	Non-points finish
Blue	Non-classified finish (NC)
Purple	Retired (Ret)
Red	Did not qualify (DNQ)
Black	Disqualified (DSQ)
White	Did not start (DNS)
White	Withdrew (WD)
White	Race cancelled (C)
Blank	Did not practice (DNP)
Blank	Excluded (EX)
Blank	Did not arrive (DNA)
Blank	Did not enter (empty cell)
Annotation	Meaning
P	Pole position
F	Fastest lap
Rider key
Colour	Meaning
Light blue	Rookie rider

=== Constructors' standings ===
Each constructor received the same number of points as their best placed rider in each race.

Pos.	Constructor	QAT (Qatar)	INA (Indonesia)	ARG (Argentina)	AME (United States)	POR (Portugal)	SPA (Spain)	FRA (France)	ITA (Italy)	CAT (Catalonia)	GER (Germany)	NED (Netherlands)	GBR (United Kingdom)	AUT (Austria)	RSM (San Marino)	ARA (Aragon)	JPN (Japan)	THA (Thailand)	AUS (Australia)	MAL (Malaysia)	VAL (Valencian Community)	Pts
1	(Spain) GasGas	2	2	1	7	1	1	3	1	1	1	2	Ret	5	3	1	1	5	1	3	1	389
2	(Japan) Honda	1	1	2	2	7	12	4	3	3	2	11	1	2	1	12	2	1	9	6	4	330
3	(Austria) KTM	3	5	6	1	2	3	1	5	2	6	6	2	3	2	3	5	4	2	4	2	323
4	(Sweden) Husqvarna	5	Ret	3	4	3	6	2	Ret	7	4	1	7	1	9	2	3	2	4	1	5	279
5	(China) CFMoto	10	3	8	6	6	5	6	19	6	13	5	10	14	20	9	11	13	12	10	13	130
Pos.	Constructor	QAT (Qatar)	INA (Indonesia)	ARG (Argentina)	AME (United States)	POR (Portugal)	SPA (Spain)	FRA (France)	ITA (Italy)	CAT (Catalonia)	GER (Germany)	NED (Netherlands)	GBR (United Kingdom)	AUT (Austria)	RSM (San Marino)	ARA (Aragon)	JPN (Japan)	THA (Thailand)	AUS (Australia)	MAL (Malaysia)	VAL (Valencian Community)	Pts

=== Teams' standings ===
The teams' standings were based on results obtained by regular and substitute riders; wild-card entries were ineligible.

Pos.	Team	Bike No.	QAT (Qatar)	INA (Indonesia)	ARG (Argentina)	AME (United States)	POR (Portugal)	SPA (Spain)	FRA (France)	ITA (Italy)	CAT (Catalonia)	GER (Germany)	NED (Netherlands)	GBR (United Kingdom)	AUT (Austria)	RSM (San Marino)	ARA (Aragon)	JPN (Japan)	THA (Thailand)	AUS (Australia)	MAL (Malaysia)	VAL (Valencian Community)	Pts
1	(Spain) GasGas Aspar Team	11	2	4	1^{P}	Ret	1	2	7	1	4	3	3	Ret	5	DSQ	13	4	Ret	3	3	3	576
1	(Spain) GasGas Aspar Team	28	8^{P}	2	Ret	7	5	1^{P F}	3^{F}	2	1	1^{P}	2	Ret	7	3	1^{P}	1	5	1	12	1^{P}	576
2	(Luxembourg) Leopard Racing	7	7^{F}	1	2	2	8	18	4^{P}	Ret	Ret^{P}	2	Ret	1	12	1^{F}	14	2	1^{P}	9	6^{P}	4	376
2	(Luxembourg) Leopard Racing	24	Ret	10	5	10	12	Ret	5	3	3	5	4	Ret	2	6	12	Ret^{P}	Ret	Ret	Ret	14	376
3	(Italy) Sterilgarda Husqvarna Max	17	5						12	Ret	7	19	Ret^{F}	7	9	9	10	7	Ret	6^{F}	1	11	340
3	(Italy) Sterilgarda Husqvarna Max	38				22	22	19			Ret												340
3	(Italy) Sterilgarda Husqvarna Max	71	Ret	Ret	3	4	3	6	2	DNS		4	1^{P}	Ret	1	Ret	2	3	2	4^{P}	2^{F}	5	340
4	(Finland) Red Bull KTM Ajo	5	Ret	7^{F}	Ret	1^{F}	2^{F}	3	1	17	8^{F}	12	Ret	2	18	2	8	Ret^{F}	8^{F}	15	4	22	280
4	(Finland) Red Bull KTM Ajo	96	16	9	7	Ret	Ret	9	11	Ret	Ret	6	6	NC	8^{P}	5	3	Ret	11	Ret	7	10	280
5	(France) Red Bull KTM Tech3	31	14	Ret	13	14	WD	Ret	20	10	9	8	Ret	15	17	16	5	18	Ret	18	15	6	251
5	(France) Red Bull KTM Tech3	53	4	5	14	5	4^{P}	4	9	15^{P}	5	7^{F}	9	3^{F}	4	4^{P}	4^{F}	15	17	2	10	2^{F}	251
6	(Spain) MT Helmets – MSi	6	9	11	12	17	21	8	8	5	21	Ret	8	8	13	13	Ret	8	10	Ret	8	9	206
6	(Spain) MT Helmets – MSi	10	6	Ret	6	Ret	10	10	14	Ret	DNS	16	16	6^{P}	6	7	15	6	6	7	5	8	206
7	(Germany) CFMoto Racing Prüstel GP	43	10	6	Ret	6	20	5	Ret	20	10	13	5	11	14	20	11	11	13	14	11	23	170
7	(Germany) CFMoto Racing Prüstel GP	99	Ret	3^{P}	8	8	6	Ret	6	19	6	Ret	14	10	Ret	Ret	9	Ret	14	12	Ret	13	170
8	(Italy) Angeluss MTA Team	38																				18	137
8	(Italy) Angeluss MTA Team	48	11	Ret	15	11	Ret	13	18	7	18	10	12	Ret	11	8	6	13	20	13	9	12	137
8	(Italy) Angeluss MTA Team	82	13	Ret	16	13	15	15	17	Ret	16	15	7	5	15	10	19	12	4	5	Ret		137
9	(Italy) Rivacold Snipers Team	16	1	Ret	Ret^{F}	3^{P}	7	14	10	4	Ret	11	15	9	23	Ret	18	9	7	16	14	15	103
9	(Italy) Rivacold Snipers Team	21																	19				103
9	(Italy) Rivacold Snipers Team	34																Ret					103
9	(Italy) Rivacold Snipers Team	63					24	22															103
9	(Italy) Rivacold Snipers Team	67	Ret	Ret	20	DNS				DNS		21	17	19	27	17	DNS			24	Ret	29	103
9	(Italy) Rivacold Snipers Team	89									Ret												103
9	(Italy) Rivacold Snipers Team	98							21														103
10	(France) CIP Green Power	27	3	12	9	Ret	17	7	15	16	15	20	10	4	10	19	23	21	Ret	17	17	24	99
10	(France) CIP Green Power	41												22									99
10	(France) CIP Green Power	66	15	18	10	18	Ret	Ret	DNS	12	12	Ret	Ret		22	14	21	Ret	12	8	18	21	99
11	(Italy) Sic58 Squadra Corse	20	Ret	16	19	15	14	DNS	23	14	20	18	13	13	16	18	Ret	Ret	16	19	19	20	98
11	(Italy) Sic58 Squadra Corse	54	12	17	4	9	11	Ret	13	6^{F}	11	Ret	11	14	19	11	16	10	3	10	Ret	Ret	98
12	(Spain) Boé Motorsports	22	20	19	Ret	23	28	23	27	22	22	22	22	23	28	22	25	19	22	23	22	28	93
12	(Spain) Boé Motorsports	44								11	2	9	Ret	Ret	3^{F}	12	7	5	9	11	Ret	7	93
12	(Spain) Boé Motorsports	87	21	21	22	20	23	20	24														93
13	(Spain) QJmotor Avintia Racing Team	9												20	26	Ret	Ret	Ret	24	22	20	16	43
13	(Spain) QJmotor Avintia Racing Team	18	17	15	18	Ret	18	11	19	9	13	Ret											43
13	(Spain) QJmotor Avintia Racing Team	23	18	8	11	19	19	16	16	8	17	14	Ret	16	20	15	20	16	18	20	13	17	43
13	(Spain) QJmotor Avintia Racing Team	85											19										43
14	(United Kingdom) VisionTrack Racing Team	19	Ret	13	Ret	12	13	12	Ret	Ret	14	Ret	Ret	12	21	25	22	20	15	Ret	Ret	Ret	21
14	(United Kingdom) VisionTrack Racing Team	70	22	20	23	Ret	26	WD	26	21	Ret	Ret	20	21	29	24	Ret	Ret	23	21	23	26	21
15	(Japan) Honda Team Asia	64	19	14	21	21	16	17	22	13	Ret	23	18	17	24	Ret	24	17	21	Ret	21	27	7
15	(Japan) Honda Team Asia	72			17	16	25	21	25	18	Ret	17	21	18	25	21	17	14	25	Ret	Ret	Ret	7
Pos.	Team	Bike No.	QAT (Qatar)	INA (Indonesia)	ARG (Argentina)	AME (United States)	POR (Portugal)	SPA (Spain)	FRA (France)	ITA (Italy)	CAT (Catalonia)	GER (Germany)	NED (Netherlands)	GBR (United Kingdom)	AUT (Austria)	RSM (San Marino)	ARA (Aragon)	JPN (Japan)	THA (Thailand)	AUS (Australia)	MAL (Malaysia)	VAL (Valencian Community)	Pts
