= David Alonso =

Colombian motorcycle racer (born 2006)

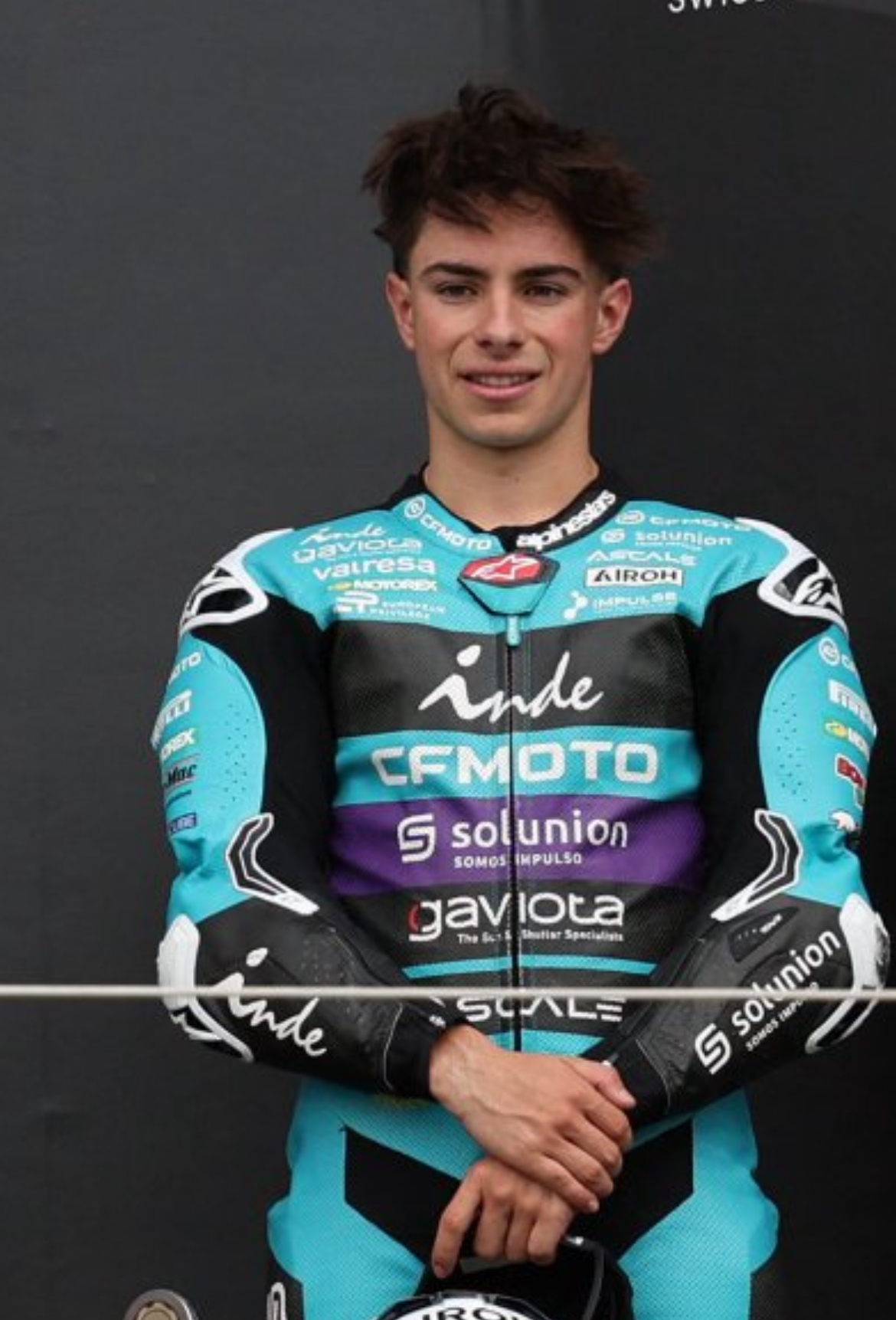
- Alonso in 2025
- Nationality: Colombian / Spanish
- Born: David Alonso Gómez; 25 April 2006 (age 20); Madrid, Spain
- Current team: CFMoto Aspar Team
- Bike number: 80
Motorcycle racing career statistics
Moto2 World Championship
Active years	2025–2026
Manufacturers	Kalex
Championships	0
2025 championship position	9th (153 pts)
Starts / Wins / Podiums / Poles / F. laps / Points; 40 / 3 / 10 / 2 / 4 / 357
Moto3 World Championship
Active years	2021–2024
Manufacturers	GasGas (2021–2023); CFMoto (2024)
Championships	1 (2024)
2024 championship position	1st (421 pts)
Starts / Wins / Podiums / Poles / F. laps / Points; 42 / 18 / 23 / 7 / 6 / 666

David Alonso Gómez (born 25 April 2006) is a Grand Prix motorcycle road racer who races for the CFMoto Aspar Team in Moto2. Colombian by maternal descent and Spanish by paternal descent, he represents Colombia internationally. Born in Spain, he also has Spanish citizenship. He won the European Talent Cup in 2020 and the Red Bull MotoGP Rookies Cup in 2021. He won the 2024 season of Moto3. Alonso is set to move up to MotoGP in 2027 with Pro Honda LCR.

== Career ==
=== Early career ===
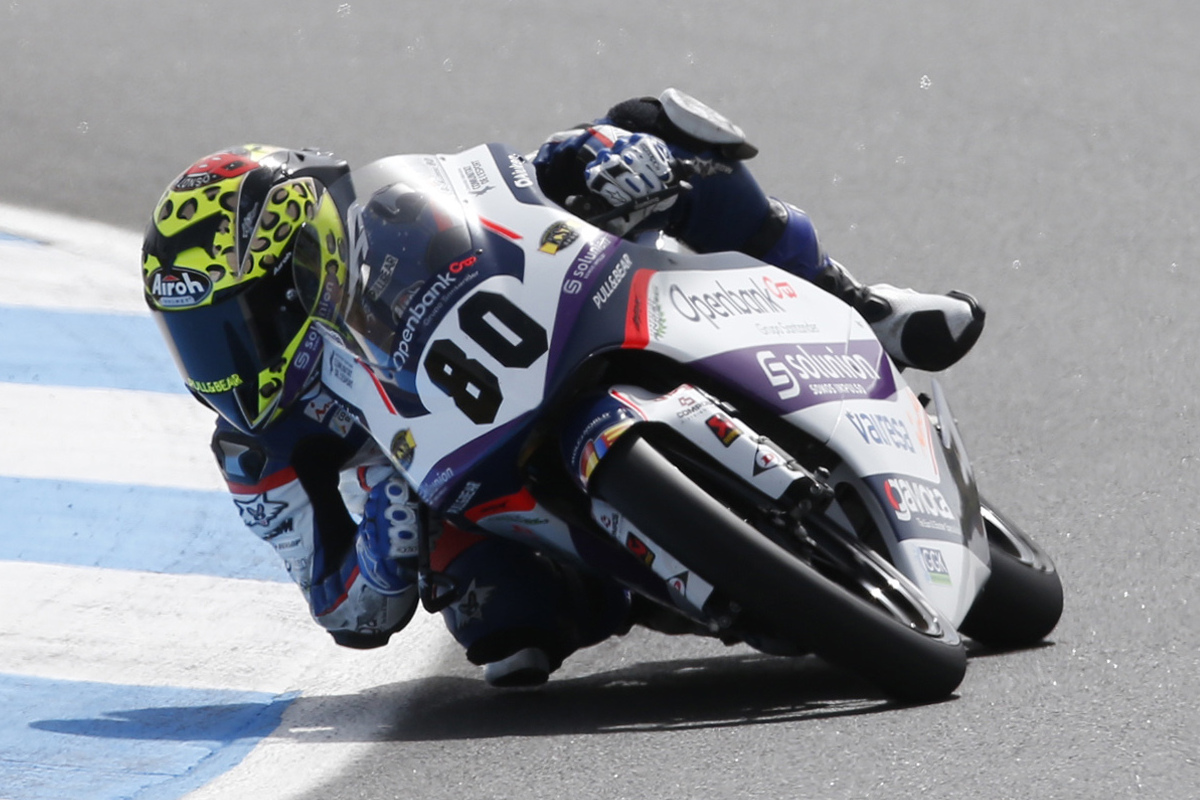
Alonso in 2020

Alonso won the European Talent Cup in 2020. The following year, he won the 2021 Red Bull MotoGP Rookies Cup. He clinched that championship when he finished third in the first race of the Aragón round on 11 September.

=== Moto3 World Championship ===
==== GasGas Aspar Team (2021-2024) ====
Alonso was signed by the GasGas Aspar Team and made his Moto3 debut at the 2021 Emilia Romagna Grand Prix as a replacement for Sergio García who was injured in the previous round. The following season, he made his second start at the Portuguese round as a wildcard rider. He made his full season debut in 2023. In 2024, he was crowned as the new champion in the Japanese Grand Prix.

=== Moto2 World Championship ===
==== CFMoto Aspar Team (2025-2026) ====
Alonso moved up to Moto2 with the CFMoto Aspar Team for the 2025 Moto2 season, partnering Daniel Holgado. He became the first rider to complete the Aspar Team's training ladder, from the Spanish Championship to the Moto2 category.

=== MotoGP World Championship ===
==== Pro Honda LCR (2027–) ====
Alonso will move up to MotoGP with Honda for the 2027, riding for Pro Honda LCR alongside Johann Zarco.

== Career statistics ==
=== European Talent Cup ===
==== Races by year ====
(key) (Races in bold indicate pole position; races in italics indicate fastest lap)

Year	Bike	1	2	3	4	5	6	7	8	9	10	11	Pos	Pts
2019	Honda	EST; 6	EST; 3	VAL; DNQ	VAL; DNQ	CAT; 7	ARA; 2	ARA; 3	JER; 5	JER; 2	ALB; 8	VAL; Ret	5th	110
2020	Honda	**EST**; 1	**EST**; 1	**ALG**; 1	JER; 1	JER; 2	JER; 2	ARA; Ret	ARA; 2	ARA; 2	VAL; 1	VAL; 2	1st	225

=== Red Bull MotoGP Rookies Cup ===
==== Races by year ====
(key) (Races in bold indicate pole position, races in italics indicate fastest lap)

Year	1	2	3	4	5	6	7	8	9	10	11	12	13	14	Pos	Pts
2020	RBR1; 4	RBR1; 4	RBR2; 4	RBR2; 4	ARA1; 5	ARA1; 2	ARA2; 3	ARA2; 1	VAL1; Ret	VAL1; 4	VAL2; Ret	VAL2; Ret			4th	137
2021	POR1; 1	POR2; 1	**SPA1**; 7	**SPA2**; 8	MUG1; 4	MUG2; 2	GER1; 1	GER2; Ret	RBR1; 3	RBR2; 1	RBR3; 1	RBR4; 1	ARA1; 3	ARA2; 3	1st	248

=== FIM CEV Moto3 Junior World Championship ===
==== Races by year ====
(key) (Races in bold indicate pole position, races in italics indicate fastest lap)

Year	Bike	1	2	3	4	5	6	7	8	9	10	11	12	Pos	Pts
2021	GasGas	EST; 3	VAL1; Ret	VAL2; Ret	CAT1; 11	CAT2; 4	POR; 6	ARA; 12	JER1; 8	JER2; 6	RSM; 16	VAL3; 2	VAL4; 9	7th	93

=== FIM JuniorGP World Championship ===
==== Races by year ====
(key) (Races in bold indicate pole position) (Races in italics indicate fastest lap)

Year	Bike	1	2	3	4	5	6	7	8	9	10	11	12	Pos	Pts
2022	GasGas	EST; 4	VAL1; 1	VAL2; 7	CAT1; 11	CAT2; 7	JER1; 7	JER1; 13	POR; Ret	RSM; Ret	ARA; 4	RIC1; Ret	RIC2; DNS	7th	86

=== Grand Prix motorcycle racing ===
==== By season ====
Season	Class	Motorcycle	Team	Race	Win	Podium	Pole	FLap	Pts	Plcd	WCh
2021	Moto3	GasGas	GasGas Aspar Team	1	0	0	0	0	0	38th	–
2022	Moto3	GasGas	GasGas Aspar Team	1	0	0	0	0	0	44th	–
2023	Moto3	GasGas	GasGas Aspar Team	20	4	8	0	3	245	**3rd**	–
2024	Moto3	CFMoto	CFMoto Aspar Team	20	14	15	7	3	421	**1st**	1
2025	Moto2	Kalex	CFMoto Aspar Team	22	1	5	0	2	153	9th	–
2026	Moto2	Kalex	CFMoto Aspar Team	18	2	5	2	2	204*	5th*	–
Total				**82**	**21**	**33**	**9**	**10**	**1023**		**1**

==== By class ====
Class	Seasons	1st GP	1st pod	1st win	Race	Win	Podiums	Pole	FLap	Pts	WChmp
Moto3	2021–2024	2021 Emilia Romagna	2023 Spain	2023 Great Britain	42	18	23	7	6	666	1
Moto2	2025–present	2025 Thailand	2025 Great Britain	2025 Hungary	40	3	10	2	4	357	0
Total	2021–present				**82**	**21**	**33**	**9**	**10**	**1023**	**1**

==== Races by year ====
(key) (Races in bold indicate pole position; races in italics indicate fastest lap)

Year	Class	Bike	1	2	3	4	5	6	7	8	9	10	11	12	13	14	15	16	17	18	19	20	21	22	Pos	Pts
2021	Moto3	GasGas	QAT	DOH	POR	SPA	FRA	ITA	CAT	GER	NED	STY	AUT	GBR	ARA	RSM	AME	EMI; 22	ALR	VAL					38th	0
2022	Moto3	GasGas	QAT	INA	ARG	AME	POR; 27	SPA	FRA	ITA	CAT	GER	NED	GBR	AUT	RSM	ARA	JPN	THA	AUS	MAL	VAL			44th	0
2023	Moto3	GasGas	POR; Ret	ARG; 14	AME; 8	SPA; 2	FRA; 8	ITA; 4	GER; 5	NED; 13	GBR; 1	AUT; 29	CAT; 1	RSM; 1	IND; 5	JPN; 7	INA; 2	AUS; Ret	THA; 1	MAL; Ret	QAT; 2	VAL; 2			3rd	245
2024	Moto3	CFMoto	QAT; 1	POR; 4	**AME**; 1	**SPA**; 11	**FRA**; 1	CAT; 1	**ITA**; 1	NED; 5	GER; 1	GBR; 2	AUT; 1	**ARA**; 4	**RSM**; 7	EMI; 1	INA; 1	JPN; 1	AUS; 1	THA; 1	MAL; 1	**SLD**; 1			1st	421
2025	Moto2	Kalex	THA; 21	ARG; 20	AME; 14	QAT; 11	SPA; Ret	FRA; 11	GBR; 3	ARA; Ret	ITA; 8	NED; Ret	GER; Ret	CZE; 9	AUT; Ret	HUN; 1	CAT; 8	RSM; 8	JPN; 4	INA; Ret	AUS; 2	MAL; 2	POR; 3	VAL; 18	9th	153
2026	Moto2	Kalex	THA; Ret	BRA; 5	USA; 4	SPA; 4	FRA; 5	CAT; 6	ITA; 18	HUN; 4	**CZE**; 2	**NED**; 1	GER; Ret	GBR; 21	ARA; 3	RSM; 9	AUT; 3	JPN; 5	INA; DNS	AUS; C	MAL; 1	QAT; 4	POR	VAL	5th*	204*

* Season still in progress.

== Records ==
As of 17 November 2024, Alonso holds the following records:

Moto3

- Most wins in the Moto3 class: 18
- Most wins in a single season: 14 (2024)
- Most consecutive wins in Moto3 class: 7 (Emilia-Romagna, Mandalika, Motegi, Philip Island, Buriram, Sepang, Barcelona 2024)
- Most points scored in a single season: 421 (2024)
- Highest win percentage in Moto3 class: 42.86 %
- Biggest title-winning margin by points: 165 (2024)

All categories

- Most wins in a single season in Grand Prix motorcycle racing: 14 (2024)
- Biggest title-winning margin by points in Grand Prix motorcycle racing: 165 (2024)
