= Joshua Whatley =

British motorcycle racer

- Nationality: British
- Born: 2 September 2005 (age 21); Chertsey, England
- Current team: Orelac Racing Verdnatura
- Bike number: 70
Motorcycle racing career statistics
Moto3 World Championship
Active years	2022–2024
Manufacturers	Honda
2024 championship position	28th (0 pts)
Starts / Wins / Podiums / Poles / F. laps / Points; 46 / 0 / 0 / 0 / 0 / 5
Supersport World Championship
Active years	2025–
Manufacturers	MV Agusta, Ducati
Championships	0
2025 championship position	45th (0 pts)
Starts / Wins / Podiums / Poles / F. laps / Points; 6 / 0 / 0 / 0 / 0 / 5

Joshua Whatley (born 2 September 2005) is a British Grand Prix motorcycle racer, previously competing in the Moto3 World Championship for Michael Laverty's MLav Racing until mid-2024.

== Career ==
Between 2019 and 2021, Whatley competed in the FIM CEV Moto3 Junior World Championship.

Whatley was signed to the VisionTrack Racing sponsored Moto3 grand prix team alongside Scott Ogden for the 2022 campaign. Both Ogden and Whatley were retained by VisionTrack for the 2023 and 2024 seasons, but VisionTrack pulled out as title sponsor before the start of 2024 events.

Ahead of the 2024 summer break, both Whatley and MLav Racing announced that they would end their partnership with immediate effect. The team stated that Whatley was too big for the Moto3 Bike which was resulting in poor performance of the British rider. Whatley was replaced by Spanish rider Vicente Pérez.

== Career statistics ==
=== British Talent Cup ===
==== Races by year ====
(key) (Races in bold indicate pole position; races in italics indicate fastest lap)

Year	Bike	1	2	3	4	5	6	7	8	9	10	11	12	Pts	Pos
2018	Honda	DON1; 2	DON2; Ret	DON3; 5	DON4; 4	SNE5; 5	SNE6; 2	SIL7; Ret	SIL8; Ret	DON9; 7	DON10; 14	SIL11; 3	SIL12; 11	4th	107

=== European Talent Cup ===
==== Races by year ====
(key) (Races in bold indicate pole position; races in italics indicate fastest lap)

Year	Bike	1	2	3	4	5	6	7	8	9	10	11	Pts	Pos
2018	Honda	EST1; 28	EST2; 23	VAL1; 9	VAL2; 19	CAT; 27	ARA1; 24	ARA2; 29	JER1	JER2	ALB; 14	VAL; 20	28th	9
2019	Honda	EST	EST	VAL	VAL	CAT	ARA; 8	ARA; 12	JER	JER	ALB	VAL	24th	12

=== FIM CEV Moto3 Junior World Championship ===
==== Races by year ====
(key) (Races in bold indicate pole position, races in italics indicate fastest lap)

Year	Team	Bike	1	2	3	4	5	6	7	8	9	10	11	12	Pos	Pts
2019	KRP	KTM	EST	VAL1	VAL2	FRA	CAT1	CAT2	ARA	JER1; 29	JER2; 28	ALB; Ret	VAL1; 31	VAL2; 19	NC	0
2020	KRP (UK) Ltd.	KTM	EST; 15	POR; 21	JER1; 12	JER2; 21	JER3; 21	ARA1; Ret	ARA2; 26	ARA3; 23	VAL1; 22	VAL2; Ret	VAL3; 18		26th	5
2021	Team MTA	KTM	EST; 21	VAL1; 11	VAL2; Ret	CAT1; 9	CAT2; 9	POR; 26	ARA; Ret	JER1; Ret	JER2; 16	RSM; 10	VAL3; Ret	VAL4; Ret	19th	25

=== FIM Moto2 European Championship ===
==== Races by year ====
(key) (Races in bold indicate pole position, races in italics indicate fastest lap)

Year	Bike	1	2	3	4	5	6	7	8	9	10	11	Pos	Pts
2024	Kalex	MIS	EST1	EST2	CAT1	CAT2	POR1	POR2	JER; Ret	ARA1; 10	ARA2; 9	EST; 12	19th	17
2025	Kalex	EST1; 14	EST2; Ret	JER; 13	MAG1; 22	MAG2; 10	ARA1; 18	ARA2; 17	MIS; Ret	CAT1; Ret	CAT2; 17	VAL; 7	22nd	20

=== Grand Prix motorcycle racing ===
==== By season ====
Season	Class	Motorcycle	Team	Race	Win	Podium	Pole	FLap	Pts	Plcd
2022	Moto3	Honda	VisionTrack Racing Team	19	0	0	0	0	0	36th
2023	Moto3	Honda	VisionTrack Racing Team	18	0	0	0	0	5	30th
2024	Moto3	Honda	MLav Racing	9	0	0	0	0	0	26th
Total				**46**	**0**	**0**	**0**	**0**	**5**	

==== By class ====
Class	Seasons	1st GP	1st pod	1st win	Race	Win	Podiums	Pole	FLap	Pts	WChmp
Moto3	2022–2024	2022 Qatar			46	0	0	0	0	5	0
Total	2022–2024				**46**	**0**	**0**	**0**	**0**	**5**	**0**

==== Races by year ====
(key) (Races in bold indicate pole position; races in italics indicate fastest lap)

Year	Class	Bike	1	2	3	4	5	6	7	8	9	10	11	12	13	14	15	16	17	18	19	20	Pos	Pts
2022	Moto3	Honda	QAT; 22	INA; 20	ARG; 23	AME; Ret	POR; 26	SPA; WD	FRA; 26	ITA; 21	CAT; Ret	GER; Ret	NED; 20	GBR; 21	AUT; 29	RSM; 24	ARA; Ret	JPN; Ret	THA; 23	AUS; 21	MAL; 23	VAL; 26	36th	0
2023	Moto3	Honda	POR; 20	ARG; 15	AME; DNS	SPA; 24	FRA; 22	ITA; 21	GER; 23	NED; Ret	GBR; 25	AUT; 27	CAT; 21	RSM; 22	IND; 16	JPN; 20	INA; 22	AUS; 14	THA; 23	MAL; 14	QAT; Ret	VAL	30th	5
2024	Moto3	Honda	QAT; 18	POR; 18	AME; 17	SPA; 23	FRA; 21	CAT; 20	ITA; 23	NED; 24	GER; 21	GBR	AUT	ARA	RSM	EMI	INA	JPN	AUS	THA	MAL	SLD	28th	0

=== Supersport World Championship ===
==== By season ====
Season	Motorcycle	Team	No	Race	Win	Podium	Pole	FLap	Pts	Plcd
2025	MV Agusta F3 800 RR	MV Agusta Reparto Corse	70	4	0	0	0	0	0	45th
2026	Ducati Panigale V2	Orelac Racing Verdnatura	70	2	0	0	0	0	5*	14th*
Total				**6**	**0**	**0**	**0**	**0**	**5**	

==== By year ====
(key) (Races in bold indicate pole position; races in italics indicate fastest lap)

Year	Bike	1		2		3		4		5		6		7		8		9		10		11		12		Pos	Pts
Year	Bike	R1	R2	R1	R2	R1	R2	R1	R2	R1	R2	R1	R2	R1	R2	R1	R2	R1	R2	R1	R2	R1	R2	R1	R2	Pos	Pts
2025	MV Agusta	AUS	AUS	POR	POR	NED	NED	ITA	ITA	CZE	CZE	EMI	EMI	GBR	GBR	HUN	HUN	FRA	FRA	ARA	ARA	POR; 21	POR; 22	SPA; 19	SPA; Ret	45th	0
2026	Ducati	AUS; 11	AUS; 17	POR	POR	NED	NED	HUN	HUN	CZE	CZE	ARA	ARA	EMI	EMI	GBR	GBR	FRA	FRA	ITA	ITA	EST	EST	SPA	SPA	14th*	5*

* Season still in progress.
