= Daniel Holgado =

Spanish motorcycle racer (born 2005)

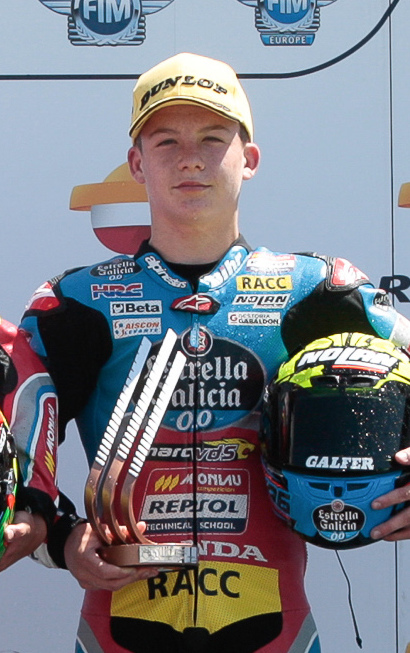
- Holgado in 2019
- Nationality: Spanish
- Born: 27 April 2005 (age 21); San Vicente del Raspeig, Spain
- Current team: CFMoto Aspar Team
- Bike number: 96
Motorcycle racing career statistics
Moto2 World Championship
Active years	2025–
Manufacturers	Kalex
2025 championship position	6th (208 pts)
Starts / Wins / Podiums / Poles / F. laps / Points; 41 / 4 / 12 / 6 / 4 / 423
Moto3 World Championship
Active years	2021–2024
Manufacturers	KTM, GasGas
Championships	0
2024 championship position	2nd (256 pts)
Starts / Wins / Podiums / Poles / F. laps / Points; 63 / 4 / 16 / 3 / 5 / 583

Daniel "Dani" Holgado Miralles (born 27 April 2005) is a Spanish Grand Prix motorcycle racer who currently competes for CFMoto Aspar Team in the 2026 Moto2 World Championship. He previously competed in the FIM CEV Moto3 Junior World Championship in 2021 with the Aspar Junior Team, where he won the championship.

Holgado is set to graduate to MotoGP for the 2027 season with Gresini Racing.

== Career ==
=== Junior career ===
Holgado won the 2021 FIM CEV Moto3 Junior World Championship with the Aspar Junior Team with 208 points. Also in 2021, he also made his Moto3 debut at the 2021 Catalan motorcycle Grand Prix, replacing Maximilian Kofler due to a fractured vertebrae. Later in the season, he was hired by Red Bull KTM Tech3 for the Emilia Romagna and the Algarve Grands Prix, replacing Deniz Öncü who was banned for two races for causing an incident involving multiple riders at the Grand Prix of the Americas.

=== Moto3 World Championship ===
==== Red Bull KTM Ajo (2022) ====
In the 2022 season, Holgado was originally scheduled to make his full season debut with Red Bull KTM Tech3, teaming up with Öncü. However, it was subsequently announced that Holgado would return to Red Bull KTM Ajo instead, where he would team up with Jaume Masià.

==== Red Bull KTM Tech3 (2023-2024) ====
In 2023, Holgado competed for the Red Bull KTM Tech3.

=== Moto2 World Championship ===
==== CFMoto Aspar Team (2025-2026) ====
For 2025 and 2026, Holgado competes in Moto2 with CFMoto Aspar Team.

=== MotoGP World Championship ===
==== Gresini Racing (2027–) ====
In mid 2026, Gresini Racing announced Holgado would join the team for the 2027 on a two year deal, partnering 2020 premier class champion Joan Mir.

== Career statistics ==
=== European Talent Cup ===
==== Races by year ====
(key) (Races in bold indicate pole position; races in italics indicate fastest lap)

Year	Bike	1	2	3	4	5	6	7	8	9	10	11	Pts	Pos
2018	Honda	EST1; Ret	EST2; 12	VAL1; 3	VAL2; DSQ	CAT; 16	ARA1; 25	ARA2; 19	JER1; 9	JER2; 7	ALB; 7	VAL; 6	11th	55

=== FIM CEV Moto3 Junior World Championship ===
==== Races by year ====
(key) (Races in bold indicate pole position, races in italics indicate fastest lap)

Year	Bike	1	2	3	4	5	6	7	8	9	10	11	12	Pos	Pts
2019	Honda	JER1	JER2; 4	MUG; 3	ASS1; 4	ASS2; 5	SAC1; Ret	SAC2; 12	RBR1; 6	RBR2; Ret	MIS; 2	ARA1; 13	ARA2; 5	6th	101
2020	KTM	EST; 5	POR; 4	JER1; 2	JER2; 4	JER3; Ret	**ARA1**; Ret	**ARA2**; 4	**ARA3**; 4	VAL1; 3	VAL2; 4	VAL3; 4		5th	125
2021	Gas Gas	EST; 1	**VAL1**; 1	**VAL2**; 1	CAT1; 4	CAT2; 1	POR; 2	ARA; 3	JER1; 5	JER2; 3	RSM; Ret	VAL3; 9	VAL4; 1	1st	208

=== Red Bull MotoGP Rookies Cup ===
==== Races by year ====
(key) (Races in bold indicate pole position, races in italics indicate fastest lap)

Year	1	2	3	4	5	6	7	8	9	10	11	12	13	14	Pos	Pts
2020	RBR1; 3	RBR1; 3	RBR2; 2	RBR2; Ret	ARA1; 2	ARA1; Ret	ARA2; Ret	ARA2; 4	VAL1; 13	VAL1; 1	**VAL2**; Ret	**VAL2**; 2			5th	133
2021	POR1; 4	POR2; 2	SPA1; 4	SPA2; 1	MUG1; 6	MUG2; 4	GER1; 4	GER2; Ret	RBR1; 9	RBR2; 7	RBR3; 4	RBR4; 7	**ARA1**; 1	**ARA2**; 2	3rd	190

=== Grand Prix motorcycle racing ===
==== By season ====
Season	Class	Motorcycle	Team	Race	Win	Podium	Pole	FLap	Pts	Plcd
2021	Moto3	KTM	CIP Green Power	1	0	0	0	0	1	28th
2021	Moto3	KTM	Red Bull KTM Tech3	2	0	0	0	0	3	28th
2022	Moto3	KTM	Red Bull KTM Ajo	20	0	1	1	0	103	10th
2023	Moto3	KTM	Red Bull KTM Tech3	20	3	7	1	2	220	5th
2024	Moto3	GasGas	Red Bull GasGas Tech3	20	1	8	1	3	256	**2nd**
2025	Moto2	Kalex	CFMoto Aspar Team	22	2	5	4	2	208	6th
2026	Moto2	Kalex	CFMoto Aspar Team	19	2	7	2	2	215*	4th*
Total				**104**	**8**	**28**	**9**	**9**	**1006**	

==== By class ====
Class	Seasons	1st GP	1st pod	1st win	Race	Win	Podiums	Pole	FLap	Pts	WChmp
Moto3	2021–2024	2021 Catalunya	2022 Aragon	2023 Portugal	63	4	16	3	5	583	0
Moto2	2025–present	2025 Thailand	2025 Austria	2025 Catalunya	41	4	12	6	4	423	0
Total	2021–present				**104**	**8**	**28**	**9**	**9**	**1006**	**0**

==== Races by year ====
(key) (Races in bold indicate pole position; races in italics indicate fastest lap)

Year	Class	Bike	1	2	3	4	5	6	7	8	9	10	11	12	13	14	15	16	17	18	19	20	21	22	Pos	Pts
2021	Moto3	KTM	QAT	DOH	POR	SPA	FRA	ITA	CAT; 15	GER	NED	STY	AUT	GBR	ARA	RSM	AME	EMI; 20	ALR; 13	VAL					28th	4
2022	Moto3	KTM	QAT; 16	INA; 9	ARG; 7	AME; Ret	POR; Ret	SPA; 9	FRA; 11	ITA; Ret	CAT; Ret	GER; 6	NED; 6	GBR; NC	**AUT**; 8	RSM; 5	ARA; 3	JPN; Ret	THA; 11	AUS; Ret	MAL; 7	VAL; 10			10th	103
2023	Moto3	KTM	POR; 1	ARG; 4	AME; 5	SPA; 6	FRA; 1	ITA; 1	GER; 3	NED; 25	GBR; 3	AUT; 2	CAT; 20	RSM; 16	IND; 4	JPN; 3	INA; 14	AUS; 13	THA; 6	MAL; Ret	**QAT**; 9	VAL; 8			5th	220
2024	Moto3	Gas Gas	**QAT**; 2	POR; 1	AME; 2	SPA; 7	FRA; 2	CAT; 6	ITA; 14	NED; 11	GER; 7	GBR; 4	AUT; 3	ARA; 9	RSM; 2	EMI; 4	INA; 6	JPN; 4	AUS; 2	THA; 12	MAL; Ret	SLD; 2			2nd	256
2025	Moto2	Kalex	THA; 8	ARG; 9	AME; 8	QAT; 4	SPA; Ret	FRA; 16	GBR; 18	ARA; Ret	ITA; 15	NED; 10	GER; 12	CZE; 4	AUT; 2	HUN; 9	**CAT**; 1	**RSM**; 3	JPN; 1	INA; Ret	AUS; 4	**MAL**; 4	POR; 7	**VAL**; 2	6th	208
2026	Moto2	Kalex	THA; 3^{‡}	**BRA**; 1	USA; 16	SPA; 11	FRA; DSQ	CAT; 5	ITA; 3	HUN; 5	CZE; 7	NED; 6	GER; 2	GBR; 4	ARA; 7	RSM; Ret	AUT; 7	JPN; 8	INA; 3	AUS; C	**MAL**; 2	QAT; 1	POR	VAL	4th*	215*

^{‡} Half points awarded as less than half of the race distance (but at least three full laps) was completed.
* Season still in progress.
