= 2022 Portuguese motorcycle Grand Prix =

Fifth round of the 2022 Grand Prix motorcycle racing season

(Portugal) 2022 Portuguese Grand Prix
Race details
- Race 5 of 20 races in the 2022 Grand Prix motorcycle racing season
- Date: 24 April 2022
- Official name: Grande Prémio Tissot de Portugal
- Location: Autódromo Internacional do Algarve; Portimão, Algarve, Portugal
- Course: Permanent racing facility; 4.592 km (2.853 mi)

MotoGP
Pole position
Rider	(France) Johann Zarco	Ducati
Time	1:42.003	
Fastest lap
Rider	(France) Fabio Quartararo	Yamaha
Time	1:39.435 on lap 10	
Podium
First	(France) Fabio Quartararo	Yamaha
Second	(France) Johann Zarco	Ducati
Third	(Spain) Aleix Espargaró	Aprilia

Moto2
Pole position
Rider	(Spain) Arón Canet	Kalex
Time	1:44.151	
Fastest lap
Rider	(United States) Joe Roberts	Kalex
Time	1:43.410 on lap 3	
Podium
First	(United States) Joe Roberts	Kalex
Second	(Italy) Celestino Vietti	Kalex
Third	(Spain) Jorge Navarro	Kalex

Moto3
Pole position
Rider	(Turkey) Deniz Öncü	KTM
Time	2:03.955	
Fastest lap
Rider	(Spain) Jaume Masià	KTM
Time	1:48.201 on lap 9	
Podium
First	(Spain) Sergio García	Gas Gas
Second	(Spain) Jaume Masià	KTM
Third	(Japan) Ayumu Sasaki	Husqvarna

The 2022 Portuguese motorcycle Grand Prix (officially known as the Grande Prémio Tissot de Portugal) was the fifth round of the 2022 Grand Prix motorcycle racing season. It was held at the Autódromo Internacional do Algarve in Portimão on 24 April 2022.

== Background ==
=== Riders' entries ===
In the MotoGP class, the presence of Lorenzo Savadori as a wildcard with Aprilia Racing should be noted in the entry list of the race. In the Moto2 class, Keminth Kubo returns to ride the Yamaha VR46 Master Camp Team Kalex after missing the Grand Prix of the Americas after having issues with his visa. In the Moto3 class, in addition to the presence of Gerard Riu as a substitute for David Muñoz, David Salvador continues to replace John McPhee, absent due to injury, while Alberto Surra misses the Grand Prix due to a micro fracture of the scaphoid of his right hand during the previous stage and is replaced by Syarifuddin Azman. David Alonso also rides as a wild card, on the Aspar Team's Gas Gas.

=== MotoGP Championship standings before the race ===
The victory at the Grand Prix of the Americas allows Enea Bastianini to take the lead in the riders' standings with 61 points, 5 more than Álex Rins, 11 more than Aleix Espargaró, 15 more than Joan Mir and 17 more than Fabio Quartararo. In the constructors' classification, Ducati confirms its leadership with 89 points, followed by KTM (59 points), Suzuki (57 points) which overtakes Aprilia (51 points), Yamaha (44 points) and Honda, which closes the list with 34 points. The team standings see Team Suzuki Ecstar firmly in the lead with 102 points, with Red Bull KTM Factory Racing and Aprilia Racing 32 and 33 points behind respectively. Gresini Racing MotoGP is fourth with 61 points and Pramac Racing is fifth at 59 points.

=== Moto2 Championship standings before the race ===
Celestino Vietti, despite retiring in the previous race, remains at the top of the riders' standings with 70 points, followed by Ai Ogura (56 points), Tony Arbolino (winner in Austin) with 54 points, Arón Canet at 49 points and Somkiat Chantra at 45 points. The constructors' classification sees Kalex with full points with 100 points, Boscoscuro with 11 points and MV Agusta with 5 points. The top five positions of the team standings are occupied by Idemitsu Honda Team Asia (101 points), Elf Marc VDS Racing Team (89 points), Flexbox HP40 (72 points), Mooney VR46 Racing Team (70 points) and GasGas Aspar Team (54 points).

=== Moto3 Championship standings before the race ===
Dennis Foggia returns to lead the riders' standings with 74 points, plus 16 from Sergio García. Andrea Migno is third on 41 points, followed by Izan Guevara and Deniz Öncü, both on 37 points. The constructors' classification sees Honda in the lead 90 points, plus 16 on Gas Gas, plus 28 on KTM, plus 50 on Husqvarna and CF Moto. In the team classification, Leopard Racing overtakes Gas Gas Aspar Team (97 points vs 95 points) in the lead. CFMoto Racing Prüstel GP is third at 58 points, with Red Bull KTM Ajo and Red Bull KTM Tech3 at 8 and 14 points behind respectively.

== Qualifying ==
=== MotoGP ===
Fastest session lap

Pos.	No.	Biker	Constructor	Qualifying times		Final grid	Row
Pos.	No.	Biker	Constructor	Q1	Q2	Final grid	Row
1	5	(France) Johann Zarco	Ducati	Qualified in Q2	1:42.003	1	1
2	36	(Spain) Joan Mir	Suzuki	Qualified in Q2	1:42.198	2	1
3	41	(Spain) Aleix Espargaró	Aprilia	Qualified in Q2	1:42.235	3	1
4	43	(Australia) Jack Miller	Ducati	Qualified in Q2	1:42.503	4	2
5	20	(France) Fabio Quartararo	Yamaha	Qualified in Q2	1:42.716	5	2
6	72	(Italy) Marco Bezzecchi	Ducati	Qualified in Q2	1:42.716	6	2
7	73	(Spain) Álex Márquez	Honda	1:46.316	1:42.903	7	3
8	10	(Italy) Luca Marini	Ducati	1:47.199	1:43.179	8	3
9	93	(Spain) Marc Márquez	Honda	Qualified in Q2	1:43.575	9	3
10	44	(Spain) Pol Espargaró	Honda	Qualified in Q2	1:43.832	10	4
11	88	(Portugal) Miguel Oliveira	KTM	Qualified in Q2	1:44.066	11	4
12	33	(South Africa) Brad Binder	KTM	Qualified in Q2	1:44.710	12	4
13	89	(Spain) Jorge Martín	Ducati	1:47.936	N/A	13	5
14	12	(Spain) Maverick Viñales	Aprilia	1:49.332	N/A	14	5
15	49	(Italy) Fabio Di Giannantonio	Ducati	1:49.639	N/A	15	5
16	4	(Italy) Andrea Dovizioso	Yamaha	1:49.695	N/A	16	6
17	30	(Japan) Takaaki Nakagami	Honda	1:49.889	N/A	17	6
18	23	(Italy) Enea Bastianini	Ducati	1:50.618	N/A	18	6
19	21	(Italy) Franco Morbidelli	Yamaha	1:50.702	N/A	19	7
20	87	(Australia) Remy Gardner	KTM	1:50.953	N/A	20	7
21	32	(Italy) Lorenzo Savadori	Aprilia	1:51.307	N/A	21	7
22	40	(South Africa) Darryn Binder	Yamaha	1:51.639	N/A	22	8
23	42	(Spain) Álex Rins	Suzuki	1:52.300	N/A	23	8
24	25	(Spain) Raúl Fernández	KTM	1:53.603	N/A	Did not start	
NC	63	(Italy) Francesco Bagnaia	Ducati	No time	N/A	24	8
OFFICIAL MOTOGP QUALIFYING RESULTS

=== Moto2 ===
Fastest session lap

Pos.	No.	Biker	Constructor	Qualifying times		Final grid	Row
Pos.	No.	Biker	Constructor	Q1	Q2	Final grid	Row
1	40	(Spain) Arón Canet	Kalex	Qualified in Q2	1:44.151	1	1
2	6	(United States) Cameron Beaubier	Kalex	Qualified in Q2	1:44.479	2	1
3	96	(United Kingdom) Jake Dixon	Kalex	Qualified in Q2	1:44.501	3	1
4	14	(Italy) Tony Arbolino	Kalex	1:45.566	1:44.560	4	2
5	37	(Spain) Augusto Fernández	Kalex	Qualified in Q2	1:44.788	5	2
6	22	(United Kingdom) Sam Lowes	Kalex	Qualified in Q2	1:44.827	6	2
7	79	(Japan) Ai Ogura	Kalex	Qualified in Q2	1:44.898	7	3
8	35	(Thailand) Somkiat Chantra	Kalex	Qualified in Q2	1:44.911	8	3
9	16	(United States) Joe Roberts	Kalex	Qualified in Q2	1:44.915	9	3
10	75	(Spain) Albert Arenas	Kalex	Qualified in Q2	1:44.999	10	4
11	9	(Spain) Jorge Navarro	Kalex	1:46.076	1:45.016	11	4
12	23	(Germany) Marcel Schrötter	Kalex	Qualified in Q2	1:45.018	12	4
13	13	(Italy) Celestino Vietti	Kalex	Qualified in Q2	1:45.076	13	5
14	42	(Spain) Marcos Ramírez	MV Agusta	1:45.533	1:45.251	14	5
15	54	(Spain) Fermín Aldeguer	Boscoscuro	Qualified in Q2	1:45.304	15	5
16	84	(Netherlands) Zonta van den Goorbergh	Kalex	1:46.086	1:45.354	16	6
17	19	(Italy) Lorenzo Dalla Porta	Kalex	Qualified in Q2	1:46.859	17	6
18	81	(Thailand) Keminth Kubo	Kalex	Qualified in Q2	2:01.251	18	6
19	12	(Czech Republic) Filip Salač	Kalex	1:46.086	N/A	19	7
20	51	(Spain) Pedro Acosta	Kalex	1:46.160	N/A	20	7
21	18	(Spain) Manuel González	Kalex	1:46.600	N/A	21	7
22	64	(Netherlands) Bo Bendsneyder	Kalex	1:46.712	N/A	22	8
23	7	(Belgium) Barry Baltus	Kalex	1:46.787	N/A	23	8
24	5	(Italy) Romano Fenati	Boscoscuro	1:46.787	N/A	24	8
25	2	(Argentina) Gabriel Rodrigo	Kalex	1:47.213	N/A	25	9
26	52	(Spain) Jeremy Alcoba	Kalex	1:47.274	N/A	26	9
27	24	(Italy) Simone Corsi	MV Agusta	1:47.676	N/A	27	9
28	61	(Italy) Alessandro Zaccone	Kalex	1:47.762	N/A	28	10
29	4	(United States) Sean Dylan Kelly	Kalex	1:48.021	N/A	29	10
30	28	(Italy) Niccolò Antonelli	Kalex	1:48.305	N/A	30	10
OFFICIAL MOTO2 QUALIFYING RESULTS

=== Moto3 ===
Fastest session lap

Pos.	No.	Biker	Constructor	Qualifying times		Final grid	Row
Pos.	No.	Biker	Constructor	Q1	Q2	Final grid	Row
1	53	(Turkey) Deniz Öncü	KTM	2:07.198	2:03.955	1	1
2	64	(Indonesia) Mario Aji	Honda	Qualified in Q2	2:03.972	2	1
3	20	(France) Lorenzo Fellon	Honda	Qualified in Q2	2:04.447	3	1
4	99	(Spain) Carlos Tatay	CFMoto	Qualified in Q2	2:04.501	4	2
5	24	(Japan) Tatsuki Suzuki	Honda	Qualified in Q2	2:04.563	5	2
6	11	(Spain) Sergio García	Gas Gas	Qualified in Q2	2:05.005	6	2
7	54	(Italy) Riccardo Rossi	Honda	Qualified in Q2	2:05.137	7	3
8	19	(United Kingdom) Scott Ogden	Honda	Qualified in Q2	2:05.202	8	3
9	28	(Spain) Izan Guevara	Gas Gas	Qualified in Q2	2:05.311	9	3
10	71	(Japan) Ayumu Sasaki	Husqvarna	Qualified in Q2	2:05.395	10	4
11	16	(Italy) Andrea Migno	Honda	Qualified in Q2	2:05.608	11	4
12	7	(Italy) Dennis Foggia	Honda	2:07.713	2:05.772	12	4
13	96	(Spain) Daniel Holgado	KTM	Qualified in Q2	2:05.967	13	5
14	10	(Brazil) Diogo Moreira	KTM	Qualified in Q2	2:06.270	14	5
15	5	(Spain) Jaume Masià	KTM	Qualified in Q2	2:06.532	15	5
16	6	(Japan) Ryusei Yamanaka	KTM	Qualified in Q2	2:07.020	16	6
17	82	(Italy) Stefano Nepa	KTM	2:08.076	2:07.238	17	6
18	70	(United Kingdom) Joshua Whatley	Honda	2:08.366	2:08.626	18	6
19	43	(Spain) Xavier Artigas	CFMoto	2:08.477	N/A	19	7
20	63	(Malaysia) Syarifuddin Azman	Honda	2:08.977	N/A	20	7
21	38	(Spain) David Salvador	Husqvarna	2:09.228	N/A	21	7
22	66	(Australia) Joel Kelso	KTM	2:09.502	N/A	22	8
23	48	(Spain) Iván Ortolá	KTM	2:09.654	N/A	23	8
24	27	(Japan) Kaito Toba	KTM	2:10.039	N/A	24	8
25	23	(Italy) Elia Bartolini	KTM	2:10.365	N/A	25	9
26	18	(Italy) Matteo Bertelle	KTM	2:10.514	N/A	26	9
27	87	(Spain) Gerard Riu	KTM	2:11.241	N/A	27	9
28	22	(Spain) Ana Carrasco	KTM	2:12.481	N/A	28	10
29	80	(Colombia) David Alonso	Gas Gas	2:13.508	N/A	29	10
NC	72	(Japan) Taiyo Furusato	Honda	No time	N/A	30	10
OFFICIAL MOTO3 QUALIFYING RESULTS

== Race ==
=== MotoGP ===
Pos.	No.	Rider	Team	Manufacturer	Laps	Time/Retired	Grid	Points
1	20	(France) Fabio Quartararo	Monster Energy Yamaha MotoGP	Yamaha	25	41:39.611	5	25
2	5	(France) Johann Zarco	Pramac Racing	Ducati	25	+5.409	1	20
3	41	(Spain) Aleix Espargaró	Aprilia Racing	Aprilia	25	+6.068	3	16
4	42	(Spain) Álex Rins	Team Suzuki Ecstar	Suzuki	25	+9.633	23	13
5	88	(Portugal) Miguel Oliveira	Red Bull KTM Factory Racing	KTM	25	+13.573	11	11
6	93	(Spain) Marc Márquez	Repsol Honda Team	Honda	25	+16.163	9	10
7	73	(Spain) Álex Márquez	LCR Honda Castrol	Honda	25	+16.183	7	9
8	63	(Italy) Francesco Bagnaia	Ducati Lenovo Team	Ducati	25	+16.511	24	8
9	44	(Spain) Pol Espargaró	Repsol Honda Team	Honda	25	+16.769	10	7
10	12	(Spain) Maverick Viñales	Aprilia Racing	Aprilia	25	+18.063	14	6
11	4	(Italy) Andrea Dovizioso	WithU Yamaha RNF MotoGP Team	Yamaha	25	+29.029	16	5
12	10	(Italy) Luca Marini	Mooney VR46 Racing Team	Ducati	25	+29.249	8	4
13	21	(Italy) Franco Morbidelli	Monster Energy Yamaha MotoGP	Yamaha	25	+33.354	19	3
14	87	(Australia) Remy Gardner	Tech3 KTM Factory Racing	KTM	25	+40.205	20	2
15	72	(Italy) Marco Bezzecchi	Mooney VR46 Racing Team	Ducati	25	+46.052	6	1
16	30	(Japan) Takaaki Nakagami	LCR Honda Idemitsu	Honda	25	+49.569	17	
17	40	(South Africa) Darryn Binder	WithU Yamaha RNF MotoGP Team	Yamaha	25	+50.303	22	
Ret	32	(Italy) Lorenzo Savadori	Aprilia Racing	Aprilia	24	Accident	21	
Ret	49	(Italy) Fabio Di Giannantonio	Gresini Racing MotoGP	Ducati	21	Mechanical	15	
Ret	36	(Spain) Joan Mir	Team Suzuki Ecstar	Suzuki	18	Collision	2	
Ret	43	(Australia) Jack Miller	Ducati Lenovo Team	Ducati	18	Collision	4	
Ret	33	(South Africa) Brad Binder	Red Bull KTM Factory Racing	KTM	17	Accident	12	
Ret	23	(Italy) Enea Bastianini	Gresini Racing MotoGP	Ducati	9	Accident	18	
Ret	89	(Spain) Jorge Martín	Pramac Racing	Ducati	4	Accident	13	
DNS	25	(Spain) Raúl Fernández	Tech3 KTM Factory Racing	KTM		Did not start		
Fastest lap: (France) Fabio Quartararo (Yamaha) – 1:39.435 (lap 10)
Sources:

- Raúl Fernández suffered a hand injury in a crash during qualifying and was declared unfit to compete.

=== Moto2 ===
The race, scheduled to be run for 23 laps, was red-flagged after 8 full laps due to a multi-rider incident involving a total of eleven riders amid bad weather conditions. The race was later restarted over 7 laps with the starting grid determined by the classification of the first part. As a result of the incident, all crashed riders (including Marcos Ramírez, who crashed before the red flag came out) were not eligible to join the restart.

Pos.	No.	Biker	Constructor	Laps	Time/Retired	Grid	Points
1	16	(United States) Joe Roberts	Kalex	7	13:55.726	9	25
2	13	(Italy) Celestino Vietti	Kalex	7	+2.818	13	20
3	9	(Spain) Jorge Navarro	Kalex	7	+2.991	11	16
4	23	(Germany) Marcel Schrötter	Kalex	7	+3.104	12	13
5	18	(Spain) Manuel González	Kalex	7	+3.199	16	11
6	52	(Spain) Jeremy Alcoba	Kalex	7	+3.821	26	10
7 (Note: One-position penalty for exceeding track limits on the last lap.)	54	(Spain) Fermín Aldeguer	Boscoscuro	7	+3.784	15	9
8	64	(Netherlands) Bo Bendsneyder	Kalex	7	+4.648	16	8
9	7	(Belgium) Barry Baltus	Kalex	7	+8.103	23	7
10	2	(Argentina) Gabriel Rodrigo	Kalex	7	+8.880	25	6
11	5	(Italy) Romano Fenati	Boscoscuro	7	+9.511	24	5
12	81	(Thailand) Keminth Kubo	Kalex	7	+22.541	18	4
13	4	(United States) Sean Dylan Kelly	Kalex	7	+24.669	29	3
14	12	(Czech Republic) Filip Salač	Kalex	7	+1:53.045	19	2
15	61	(Italy) Alessandro Zaccone	Kalex	6	+1 lap	28	1
Ret	28	(Italy) Niccolò Antonelli	Kalex	3	Accident	30	
Ret	96	(United Kingdom) Jake Dixon	Kalex	0	Accident	3	
Ret	40	(Spain) Arón Canet	Kalex	0	Did not restart	1	
Ret	6	(United States) Cameron Beaubier	Kalex	0	Did not restart	2	
Ret	14	(Italy) Tony Arbolino	Kalex	0	Did not restart	4	
Ret	37	(Spain) Augusto Fernández	Kalex	0	Did not restart	5	
Ret	22	(United Kingdom) Sam Lowes	Kalex	0	Did not restart	6	
Ret	79	(Japan) Ai Ogura	Kalex	0	Did not restart	7	
Ret	35	(Thailand) Somkiat Chantra	Kalex	0	Did not restart	8	
Ret	75	(Spain) Albert Arenas	Kalex	0	Did not restart	10	
Ret	84	(Netherlands) Zonta van den Goorbergh	Kalex	0	Did not restart	16	
Ret	19	(Italy) Lorenzo Dalla Porta	Kalex	0	Did not restart	17	
Ret	51	(Spain) Pedro Acosta	Kalex	0	Did not restart	20	
Ret	24	(Italy) Simone Corsi	MV Agusta	0	Did not restart	27	
Ret	42	(Spain) Marcos Ramírez	MV Agusta	0	Did not restart	14	
Fastest lap: (United States) Joe Roberts (Kalex) – 1:43.410 (lap 3)
OFFICIAL MOTO2 RACE PART 1 REPORT OFFICIAL MOTO2 RACE PART 2 REPORT

=== Moto3 ===
Pos.	No.	Biker	Constructor	Laps	Time/Retired	Grid	Points
1	11	(Spain) Sergio García	Gas Gas	21	38:17.725	6	25
2	5	(Spain) Jaume Masià	KTM	21	+0.069	15	20
3	71	(Japan) Ayumu Sasaki	Husqvarna	21	+0.110	10	16
4	53	(Turkey) Deniz Öncü	KTM	21	+0.210	1	13
5	28	(Spain) Izan Guevara	Gas Gas	21	+0.373	9	11
6	99	(Spain) Carlos Tatay	CFMoto	21	+4.094	4	10
7	16	(Italy) Andrea Migno	Honda	21	+4.729	11	9
8	7	(Italy) Dennis Foggia	Honda	21	+7.170	12	8
9	66	(Australia) Joel Kelso	KTM	21	+7.241	22	7
10 (Note: Two-position penalty for exceeding track limits on the last lap.)	10	(Brazil) Diogo Moreira	KTM	21	+7.165	14	6
11	54	(Italy) Riccardo Rossi	Honda	21	+7.276	7	5
12	24	(Japan) Tatsuki Suzuki	Honda	21	+7.334	5	4
13	19	(United Kingdom) Scott Ogden	Honda	21	+7.442	8	3
14	20	(France) Lorenzo Fellon	Honda	21	+18.989	3	2
15	82	(Italy) Stefano Nepa	KTM	21	+22.437	17	1
16	64	(Indonesia) Mario Aji	Honda	21	+22.627	2	
17	27	(Japan) Kaito Toba	KTM	21	+25.411	24	
18	18	(Italy) Matteo Bertelle	KTM	21	+26.195	26	
19	23	(Italy) Elia Bartolini	KTM	21	+26.213	25	
20	43	(Spain) Xavier Artigas	CFMoto	21	+26.580	19	
21	6	(Japan) Ryusei Yamanaka	KTM	21	+27.217	16	
22	38	(Spain) David Salvador	Husqvarna	21	+30.402	21	
23	87	(Spain) Gerard Riu	KTM	21	+42.926	27	
24	63	(Malaysia) Syarifuddin Azman	Honda	21	+42.989	20	
25	72	(Japan) Taiyo Furusato	Honda	21	+50.532	30	
26	70	(United Kingdom) Joshua Whatley	Honda	21	+50.902	18	
27	80	(Colombia) David Alonso	Gas Gas	21	+51.199	29	
28	22	(Spain) Ana Carrasco	KTM	21	+54.005	28	
Ret	96	(Spain) Daniel Holgado	KTM	17	Accident	13	
Ret	48	(Spain) Iván Ortolá	KTM	7	Accident	23	
WD	31	(Spain) Adrián Fernández	KTM		Withdrew		
Fastest lap: (Spain) Jaume Masià (KTM) – 1:48.201 (lap 9)
OFFICIAL MOTO3 RACE REPORT

== Championship standings after the race ==
Below are the standings for the top five riders, constructors, and teams after the round.

=== MotoGP ===
Riders' Championship standings

	Pos.	Rider	Points
4	1	(France) Fabio Quartararo	69
	2	(Spain) Álex Rins	69
	3	(Spain) Aleix Espargaró	66
3	4	(Italy) Enea Bastianini	61
3	5	(France) Johann Zarco	51

Constructors' Championship standings

	Pos.	Constructor	Points
	1	(Italy) Ducati	106
	2	(Austria) KTM	70
	3	(Japan) Suzuki	70
1	4	(Japan) Yamaha	69
1	5	(Italy) Aprilia	67

Teams' Championship standings

	Pos.	Team	Points
	1	(Japan) Team Suzuki Ecstar	115
1	2	(Italy) Aprilia Racing	91
3	3	(Japan) Monster Energy Yamaha MotoGP	86
2	4	(Austria) Red Bull KTM Factory Racing	81
	5	(Italy) Pramac Racing	79

=== Moto2 ===
Riders' Championship standings

	Pos.	Rider	Points
	1	(Italy) Celestino Vietti	90
	2	(Japan) Ai Ogura	56
	3	(Italy) Tony Arbolino	54
5	4	(United States) Joe Roberts	49
1	5	(Spain) Arón Canet	49

Constructors' Championship standings

Pos.	Constructor	Points
1	(Germany) Kalex	125
2	(Italy) Boscoscuro	20
3	(Italy) MV Agusta	5

Teams' Championship standings

	Pos.	Team	Points
	1	(Japan) Idemitsu Honda Team Asia	101
2	2	(Italy) Mooney VR46 Racing Team	90
1	3	(Belgium) Elf Marc VDS Racing Team	89
1	4	(Spain) Flexbox HP40	88
2	5	(Germany) Liqui Moly Intact GP	60

=== Moto3 ===
Riders' Championship standings

	Pos.	Rider	Points
1	1	(Spain) Sergio García	83
1	2	(Italy) Dennis Foggia	82
3	3	(Spain) Jaume Masià	54
1	4	(Italy) Andrea Migno	50
	5	(Turkey) Deniz Öncü	50

Constructors' Championship standings

	Pos.	Constructor	Points
1	1	(Spain) Gas Gas	99
1	2	(Japan) Honda	99
	3	(Austria) KTM	82
	4	(Sweden) Husqvarna	56
	5	(China) CFMoto	50

Teams' Championship standings

	Pos.	Team	Points
1	1	(Spain) Valresa GasGas Aspar Team	131
1	2	(Luxembourg) Leopard Racing	109
1	3	(Finland) Red Bull KTM Ajo	70
1	4	(Germany) CFMoto Racing Prüstel GP	68
	5	(France) Red Bull KTM Tech3	57

== Notes ==
Previous race: 2022 Grand Prix of the Americas	FIM Grand Prix World Championship; 2022 season	Next race: 2022 Spanish Grand Prix
Previous race: 2021 Portuguese Grand Prix	Portuguese motorcycle Grand Prix	Next race: 2023 Portuguese Grand Prix
