= 2021 Red Bull MotoGP Rookies Cup =

Motorcycle racing competition

2021 Red Bull MotoGP Rookies Cup
Previous:	2020	Next:	2022

The 2021 Red Bull MotoGP Rookies Cup was the fifteenth season of the Red Bull MotoGP Rookies Cup. The season, for the ninth year contested by the riders on equal KTM 250cc 4-stroke Moto3 bikes, was held over 14 races in seven meetings on the Grand Prix motorcycle racing calendar, beginning at Algarve International Circuit, Portimão on 17 April and ending on 12 September at the MotorLand Aragón.

== Calendar ==
2021 calendar
Round	Date	Circuit	Pole position	Fastest lap	Race winner	Sources
1	17 April	(Portugal) Algarve	(Brazil) Diogo Moreira	(Spain) Marcos Uriarte	(Colombia) David Alonso	
1	18 April	(Portugal) Algarve	(Brazil) Diogo Moreira	(Spain) Marcos Uriarte	(Colombia) David Alonso	
2	1 May	(Spain) Jerez	(Colombia) David Alonso	(Spain) Marcos Uriarte	(Spain) David Muñoz	
2	2 May	(Spain) Jerez	(Colombia) David Alonso	(Brazil) Diogo Moreira	(Spain) Daniel Holgado	
3	29 May	(Italy) Mugello	(Spain) Marcos Uriarte	(Brazil) Diogo Moreira	(Japan) Taiyo Furusato	
3	30 May	(Italy) Mugello	(Spain) Marcos Uriarte	(Japan) Sho Nishimura	(Spain) David Muñoz	
4	19 June	(Germany) Sachsenring	(Italy) Matteo Bertelle	(Spain) Marcos Uriarte	(Colombia) David Alonso	
4	20 June	(Germany) Sachsenring	(Italy) Matteo Bertelle	(Italy) Matteo Bertelle	(Italy) Matteo Bertelle	
5	7 August	(Austria) Red Bull Ring	(Spain) David Muñoz	(Italy) Matteo Bertelle	(Spain) Daniel Muñoz	
5	8 August	(Austria) Red Bull Ring	(Spain) David Muñoz	(Spain) Marcos Uriarte	(Colombia) David Alonso	
6	14 August	(Austria) Red Bull Ring	(Spain) Álex Millán	(Colombia) David Alonso	(Colombia) David Alonso	
6	15 August	(Austria) Red Bull Ring	(Spain) Álex Millán	(Spain) Daniel Muñoz	(Colombia) David Alonso	
7	11 September	Aragon	(Spain) Daniel Holgado	(Spain) David Muñoz	(Spain) Daniel Holgado	
7	12 September	Aragon	(Spain) Daniel Holgado	(Japan) Taiyo Furusato	(Spain) Iván Ortolá	

== Entry list ==
2021 entry list
No.	Rider	Rounds
5	(Thailand) Tatchakorn Buasri	All
7	(Spain) Daniel Muñoz	All
8	(United Kingdom) Eddie O'Shea	All
9	(Germany) Freddie Heinrich	All
13	(Japan) Sho Nishimura	All
14	(New Zealand) Cormac Buchanan	All
19	(United Kingdom) Scott Ogden	All
21	(Italy) Demis Mihaila	1–4, 7
23	(Spain) Álex Millán	All
24	(Spain) Iván Ortolá	All
28	(Italy) Matteo Bertelle	All
29	(Australia) Harrison Voight	1–2, 4
34	(Indonesia) Mario Aji	1–6
39	(France) Bartholomé Perrin	All
42	(Hungary) Soma Görbe	All
48	(France) Gabin Planques	1
55	(Switzerland) Noah Dettwiler	1–6
58	(Italy) Luca Lunetta	All
64	(Spain) David Muñoz	All
72	(Japan) Taiyo Furusato	3–7
77	(Italy) Filippo Farioli	All
78	(Austria) Jakob Rosenthaler	All
80	(Colombia) David Alonso	All
89	(Spain) Marcos Uriarte	All
92	(Brazil) Diogo Moreira	1–4, 7
95	(Netherlands) Collin Veijer	1–4, 6–7
96	(Spain) Daniel Holgado	All

== Championship standings ==
Points were awarded to the top fifteen riders, provided the rider finished the race.

Position	**1st**	**2nd**	**3rd**	**4th**	**5th**	**6th**	**7th**	**8th**	**9th**	**10th**	**11th**	**12th**	**13th**	**14th**	**15th**
Points	25	20	16	13	11	10	9	8	7	6	5	4	3	2	1

Pos.	Rider	POR (Portugal)		JER (Spain)		MUG (Italy)		SAC (Germany)		RBR (Austria)		RBR (Austria)		ARA (Aragon)		Pts
1	(Colombia) David Alonso	1	1	**7**	**8**	4	2	1	Ret	3	1	1	1	3	3	248
2	(Spain) David Muñoz	5	4	1	7	2	1	3	Ret	**4**	**3**	2	6	2	4	211
3	(Spain) Daniel Holgado	4	2	4	1	6	4	4	Ret	9	7	4	7	**1**	**2**	190
4	(Spain) Iván Ortolá	6	6	2	Ret	10	3	5	Ret	2	4	6	3	Ret	1	157
5	(Spain) Daniel Muñoz	8	12	6	6	7	17	Ret	2	1	5	Ret	5	6	5	129
6	(Brazil) Diogo Moreira	**2**	**8**	3	2	3	15	6	4					4	6	127
7	(Italy) Matteo Bertelle	Ret	5	11	4	5	6	**Ret**	**1**	7	6	9	11	5	7	126
8	(Thailand) Tatchakorn Buasri	13	Ret	13	13	9	8	10	3	5	2	3	2	16	14	115
9	(Spain) Marcos Uriarte	3	9	5	Ret	**12**	**5**	2	Ret	6	Ret	8	10	DNS	DNS	93
10	(Spain) Álex Millán	7	3	9	3	Ret	12	DNS	DNS	8	9	**12**	**21**	8	9	86
11	(Japan) Taiyo Furusato					1	14	Ret	Ret	10	8	5	4	7	Ret	74
12	(Netherlands) Collin Veijer	10	7	10	Ret	11	7	Ret	11			11	8	12	11	62
13	(Italy) Luca Lunetta	16	Ret	14	19	16	10	8	6	11	10	13	14	9	8	57
14	(United Kingdom) Scott Ogden	9	10	15	9	13	13	Ret	9	21	14	7	9	11	Ret	57
15	(Italy) Filippo Farioli	11	18	16	Ret	20	9	7	10	12	12	10	13	10	10	56
16	(Indonesia) Mario Aji	12	11	8	5	8	Ret	Ret	7	14	11	17	15			53
17	(Switzerland) Noah Dettwiler	17	Ret	12	10	14	DNS	9	5	13	15	16	12			38
18	(Japan) Sho Nishimura	14	16	18	11	18	11	11	14	16	13	Ret	16	13	12	29
19	(Australia) Harrison Voight	19	13	17	12			12	8							19
20	(Hungary) Soma Görbe	Ret	21	Ret	17	17	Ret	13	12	15	21	15	22	15	15	11
21	(United Kingdom) Eddie O'Shea	21	19	23	15	22	Ret	Ret	13	19	17	19	17	14	13	9
22	(Austria) Jakob Rosenthaler	15	15	Ret	14	19	19	15	15	17	16	20	18	Ret	18	6
23	(Italy) Demis Mihaila	18	17	20	16	15	16	14	Ret					17	Ret	3
24	(France) Bartholomé Perrin	Ret	Ret	21	20	21	20	16	17	20	19	14	Ret	18	16	2
25	(Germany) Freddie Heinrich	20	14	19	Ret	Ret	21	Ret	Ret	18	18	18	19	19	17	2
26	(New Zealand) Cormac Buchanan	22	20	22	18	23	18	17	16	Ret	20	21	20	20	19	0
	(France) Gabin Planques	Ret	DNS													0
Pos.	Rider	POR (Portugal)		JER (Spain)		MUG (Italy)		SAC (Germany)		RBR (Austria)		RBR (Austria)		ARA (Aragon)		Pts

Colour	Result
Gold	Winner
Silver	Second place
Bronze	Third place
Green	Points classification
Blue	Non-points classification
Blue	Non-classified finish (NC)
Purple	Retired, not classified (Ret)
Red	Did not qualify (DNQ)
Red	Did not pre-qualify (DNPQ)
Black	Disqualified (DSQ)
White	Did not start (DNS)
White	Withdrew (WD)
White	Race cancelled (C)
Blank	Did not practice (DNP)
Blank	Did not arrive (DNA)
Blank	Excluded (EX)

**Bold** – Pole position
Italics – Fastest lap
