= 2022 Australian motorcycle Grand Prix =

Eighteenth round of the 2022 Grand Prix motorcycle racing season

(Australia) 2022 Australian Grand Prix
Race details
- Race 18 of 20 races in the 2022 Grand Prix motorcycle racing season
- Date: 16 October 2022
- Official name: Animoca Brands Australian Motorcycle Grand Prix
- Location: Phillip Island Grand Prix Circuit; Phillip Island, Victoria, Australia
- Course: Permanent racing facility; 4.448 km (2.764 mi)

MotoGP
Pole position
Rider	(Spain) Jorge Martín	Ducati
Time	1:27.767	
Fastest lap
Rider	(France) Johann Zarco	Ducati
Time	1:29.622 on lap 13	
Podium
First	(Spain) Álex Rins	Suzuki
Second	(Spain) Marc Márquez	Honda
Third	(Italy) Francesco Bagnaia	Ducati

Moto2
Pole position
Rider	(Spain) Fermín Aldeguer	Boscoscuro
Time	1:32.233	
Fastest lap
Rider	(Spain) Alonso López	Boscoscuro
Time	1:33.030 on lap 3	
Podium
First	(Spain) Alonso López	Boscoscuro
Second	(Spain) Pedro Acosta	Kalex
Third	(United Kingdom) Jake Dixon	Kalex

Moto3
Pole position
Rider	(Japan) Ayumu Sasaki	Husqvarna
Time	1:35.854	
Fastest lap
Rider	(United Kingdom) John McPhee	Husqvarna
Time	1:36.886 on lap 8	
Podium
First	(Spain) Izan Guevara	Gas Gas
Second	(Turkey) Deniz Öncü	KTM
Third	(Spain) Sergio García	Gas Gas

The 2022 Australian motorcycle Grand Prix (officially known as the Animoca Brands Australian Motorcycle Grand Prix) was the eighteenth round of the 2022 Grand Prix motorcycle racing season. It was held at the Phillip Island Grand Prix Circuit in Phillip Island on 16 October 2022.

The Grand Prix returned to Australia after absences in 2020 and 2021 in response to the COVID-19 pandemic.

In the Moto3 class, Izan Guevara secured the Riders' Championship after taking his sixth win of the season. Additionally, the GasGas Aspar Team secured its first Teams' Championship after Guevara's win and Sergio García's third place.

== Background ==
=== Miller Corner ===
During the weekend, the fourth corner of the Phillip Island Circuit, formerly known as the "Honda Corner", was renamed the "Miller Corner" in honor of Jack Miller.

== Free practice ==
=== MotoGP ===
==== Combinated Free Practice 1-2-3 ====
The top ten riders (written in bold) qualified in Q2.

Fastest session lap

Pos.	No.	Biker	Constructor	Free practice times		
Pos.	No.	Biker	Constructor	FP1	FP2	FP3
1	93	**(Spain) Marc Márquez**	**Honda**	1:30.897	1:29.775	1:28.462
2	10	**(Italy) Luca Marini**	**Ducati**	1:32.831	1:30.725	1:28.592
3	89	**(Spain) Jorge Martín**	**Ducati**	1:31.419	1:29.881	1:28.616
4	41	**(Spain) Aleix Espargaró**	**Aprilia**	1:30.687	1:29.832	1:28.639
5	72	**(Italy) Marco Bezzecchi**	**Ducati**	1:31.166	1:29.513	1:28.690
6	43	**(Australia) Jack Miller**	**Ducati**	1:30.459	1:30.021	1:28.721
7	73	**(Spain) Alex Márquez**	**Honda**	1:30.493	1:30.088	1:28.765
8	63	**(Italy) Francesco Bagnaia**	**Ducati**	1:31.077	1:29.838	1:28.768
9	12	**(Spain) Maverick Viñales**	**Aprilia**	1:31.436	1:29.745	1:28.777
10	20	**(France) Fabio Quartararo**	**Yamaha**	1:31.195	1:29.614	1:28.858
11	5	(France) Johann Zarco	Ducati	1:30.368	1:29.475	1:28.903
12	36	(Spain) Joan Mir	Suzuki	1:31.531	1:29.944	1:28.920
13	35	(United Kingdom) Cal Crutchlow	Yamaha	1:31.868	1:30.206	1:28.945
14	23	(Italy) Enea Bastianini	Ducati	1:30.790	1:29.849	1:29.023
15	44	(Spain) Pol Espargaró	Honda	1:31.194	1:29.527	1:29.095
16	88	(Portugal) Miguel Oliveira	KTM	1:31.950	1:29.923	1:29.113
17	42	(Spain) Álex Rins	Suzuki	1:30.511	1:30.138	1:29.144
18	49	(Italy) Fabio Di Giannantonio	Ducati	1:31.087	1:30.158	1:29.526
19	25	(Spain) Raúl Fernández	KTM	1:32.947	1:30.841	1:29.527
20	33	(South Africa) Brad Binder	KTM	1:32.566	1:30.099	1:29.589
21	21	(Italy) Franco Morbidelli	Yamaha	1:32.178	1:30.619	1:29.654
22	87	(Australia) Remy Gardner	KTM	1:32.207	1:30.940	1:29.691
23	45	(Japan) Tetsuta Nagashima	Honda	1:34.437	1:31.577	1:30.073
24	40	(South Africa) Darryn Binder	Yamaha	1:31.700	1:31.078	1:30.336
OFFICIAL MOTOGP COMBINED FREE PRACTICE TIMES REPORT

==== Free Practice 4 ====
Fastest session lap

Pos.	No.	Biker	Constructor	
Pos.	No.	Biker	Constructor	Time results
1	12	(Spain) Maverick Viñales	Aprilia	1:28.976
2	5	(France) Johann Zarco	Ducati	1:29.128
3	72	(Italy) Marco Bezzecchi	Ducati	1:29.323
4	63	(Italy) Francesco Bagnaia	Ducati	1:29.333
5	36	(Spain) Joan Mir	Suzuki	1:29.406
6	20	(France) Fabio Quartararo	Yamaha	1:29.417
7	89	(Spain) Jorge Martín	Ducati	1:29.440
8	41	(Spain) Aleix Espargaró	Aprilia	1:29.463
9	43	(Australia) Jack Miller	Ducati	1:29.481
10	21	(Italy) Franco Morbidelli	Yamaha	1:29.504
11	44	(Spain) Pol Espargaró	Honda	1:29.513
12	35	(United Kingdom) Cal Crutchlow	Yamaha	1:29.539
13	93	(Spain) Marc Márquez	Honda	1:29.599
14	88	(Portugal) Miguel Oliveira	KTM	1:29.656
15	23	(Italy) Enea Bastianini	Ducati	1:29.666
16	10	(Italy) Luca Marini	Ducati	1:29.703
17	42	(Spain) Álex Rins	Suzuki	1:29.863
18	33	(South Africa) Brad Binder	KTM	1:29.946
19	49	(Italy) Fabio Di Giannantonio	Ducati	1:30.071
20	73	(Spain) Alex Márquez	Honda	1:30.205
21	87	(Australia) Remy Gardner	KTM	1:30.217
22	45	(Japan) Tetsuta Nagashima	Honda	1:30.222
23	25	(Spain) Raúl Fernández	KTM	1:30.260
24	40	(South Africa) Darryn Binder	Yamaha	1:30.270
OFFICIAL MOTOGP FREE PRACTICE NR.4 TIMES REPORT

=== Moto2 ===
==== Combinated Free Practice ====
The top fourteen riders (written in bold) qualified in Q2.

Fastest session lap

Pos.	No.	Biker	Constructor	Free practice times		
Pos.	No.	Biker	Constructor	FP1	FP2	FP3
1	21	**(Spain) Alonso López**	**Boscoscuro**	1:35.402	1:34.228	**1:32.616**
2	54	**(Spain)** **Fermín Aldeguer**	**Boscoscuro**	1:35.346	1:34.149	**1:32.934**
3	40	**(Spain) Augusto Fernández**	**Kalex**	1:34.704	1:34.619	**1:32.993**
4	40	**(Spain) Arón Canet**	**Kalex**	1:35.050	1:34.603	**1:33.090**
5	96	**(United Kingdom)** **Jake Dixon**	**Kalex**	1:34.840	1:33.767	**1:33.194**
6	51	**(Spain) Pedro Acosta**	**Kalex**		1:34.850	**1:33.503**
7	14	**(Italy) Tony Arbolino**	**Kalex**	1:35.001	1:35.627	**1:33.544**
8	16	**(United States) Joe Roberts**	**Kalex**	1:35.546	1:34.508	**1:33.552**
9	64	**(Netherlands)** **Bo Bendsneyder**	**Kalex**	1:35.018	1:35.122	**1:33.584**
10	12	**(Czech Republic)** **Filip Salač**	**Kalex**	1:34.778	1:34.643	**1:33.614**
11	79	(Japan) **Ai Ogura**	**Kalex**	1:35.876	1:35.096	**1:33.683**
12	52	(Spain) **Jeremy Alcoba**	**Kalex**	1:35.531	1:35.115	**1:33.777**
13	6	(United States) **Cameron Beaubier**	**Kalex**	1:36.158	1:35.062	**1:33.778**
14	22	(United Kingdom) **Sam Lowes**	**Kalex**	1:35.287	1:34.544	**1:33.835**
15	18	(Spain) Manuel González	Kalex	1:35.476	1:35.148	**1:33.892**
16	75	(Spain) Albert Arenas	Kalex	1:35.295	1:34.821	**1:34.015**
17	19	(Italy) Lorenzo Dalla Porta	Kalex	1:38.199	1:36.529	**1:34.056**
18	13	(Italy) Celestino Vietti	Kalex	1:37.326	1:35.083	**1:34.144**
19	24	(Italy) Simone Corsi	MV Agusta	1:36.867	1:35.543	**1:34.321**
20	35	(Thailand) Somkiat Chantra	Kalex	1:34.970	**1:34.665**	
21	4	(United States) Sean Dylan Kelly	Kalex	1:36.554	1:36.110	**1:34.687**
22	23	(Germany) Marcel Schrötter	Kalex	1:35.799	**1:34.929**	1:35.025
23	28	(Italy) Niccolò Antonelli	Kalex	1:36.672	1:35.876	**1:34.930**
24	9	(Spain) Jorge Navarro	Kalex	1:36.908	1:35.360	**1:35.064**
25	7	(Belgium) Barry Baltus	Kalex	1:36.231	1:35.199	**1:35.167**
26	61	(Italy) Alessandro Zaccone	Kalex	1:44.550	1:36.099	**1:35.340**
27	29	(Japan) Taiga Hada	Kalex	1:37.528	1:38.134	**1:35.615**
28	42	(Spain) Marcos Ramírez	MV Agusta	1:36.192	1:36.019	**1:35.644**
29	81	(Thailand) Keminth Kubo	Kalex	1:36.938	**1:36.167**	1:36.248
OFFICIAL MOTO2 COMBINED FREE PRACTICE TIMES REPORT

=== Moto3 ===
==== Combined Free Practice 1-2-3 ====
Fastest session lap

Pos.	No.	Biker	Constructor	Free practice times		
Pos.	No.	Biker	Constructor	FP1	FP2	FP3
1	71	**(Japan) Ayumu Sasaki**	**Husqvarna**	1:40.657	1:37.797	1:36.112
2	11	**(Spain) Sergio García**	**Gas Gas**	1:39.876	1:38.355	1:36.460
3	96	**(Spain) Daniel Holgado**	**KTM**	1:40.307	1:39.369	1:36.609
4	53	**(Turkey)** **Deniz Öncü**	**KTM**	1:40.843	1:39.174	1:36.837
5	7	**(Italy) Dennis Foggia**	**Honda**	1:39.830	1:38.466	1:36.872
6	82	**(Italy) Stefano Nepa**	**KTM**	1:40.405	1:38.553	1:36.898
7	24	**(Japan) Tatsuki Suzuki**	**Honda**	1:40.250	1:37.986	1:36.899
8	10	**(Brazil) Diogo Moreira**	**KTM**	1:39.773	1:38.205	1:36.944
9	28	**(Spain) Izan Guevara**	**Gas Gas**	1:40.654	1:38.330	1:37.170
10	5	**(Spain) Jaume Masià**	**KTM**	1:41.014	1:38.576	1:37.208
11	31	(Spain) **Adrián Fernández**	**KTM**	1:42.504	1:38.624	1:37.232
12	48	(Spain) **Iván Ortolá**	**KTM**	1:42.236	1:39.467	1:37.292
13	66	(Australia) **Joel Kelso**	**KTM**	1:39.917	1:38.884	1:37.316
14	27	(Japan) **Kaito Toba**	**KTM**	1:41.654	1:38.986	1.37.376
15	9	(Italy) Nicola Carraro	KTM	1:42.419	1:40.203	1:37.394
16	44	(Spain) David Muñoz	KTM	1:41.494	1:39.332	1:37.436
17	67	(Italy) Alberto Surra	Honda	1:43.502	1:40.107	1:37.521
18	43	(Spain) Xavier Artigas	CFMoto	1:42.043	1:39.821	1:37.553
19	19	(United Kingdom) Scott Ogden	Honda	1:41.635	1:38.916	1:37.663
20	16	(Italy) Andrea Migno	Honda	1:41.123	1:38.538	1:37.678
21	72	(Japan) Taiyo Furusato	Honda	1:42.218	1:40.038	1:37.722
22	20	(France) Lorenzo Fellon	Honda	1:42.580	1:39.871	1:37.862
23	99	(Spain) Carlos Tatay	CFMoto	1:40.939	1:39.060	1:37.884
24	23	(Italy) Elia Bartolini	KTM	1:43.415	1:39.683	1.37.902
25	54	(Italy) Riccardo Rossi	Honda	1:41.890	1:39.950	1:37.919
26	6	(Japan) Ryusei Yamanaka	KTM	1:41.828	1:39.199	1:37.931
27	17	(United Kingdom) John McPhee	Husqvarna	1:42.382	1:38.760	1:38.324
28	70	(United Kingdom) Joshua Whatley	Honda	1:42.893	1:41.035	1:38.737
29	64	(Indonesia) Mario Aji	Honda	1:43.189	1:39.679	1:39.444
30	2	(Spain) Ana Carrasco	KTM	1:42.778	1:40.566	1:39.468
OFFICIAL MOTO3 COMBINED FREE PRACTICE TIMES REPORT

== Qualifying ==
=== MotoGP ===
Fastest session lap

Pos.	No.	Biker	Constructor	Qualifying times		Final grid	Row
Pos.	No.	Biker	Constructor	Q1	Q2	Final grid	Row
1	89	(Spain) Jorge Martín	Ducati	Qualified in Q2	1:27.767	1	1
2	93	(Spain) Marc Márquez	Honda	Qualified in Q2	1:27.780	2	1
3	63	(Italy) Francesco Bagnaia	Ducati	Qualified in Q2	1:27.953	3	1
4	41	(Spain) Aleix Espargaró	Aprilia	Qualified in Q2	1:27.957	4	2
5	20	(France) Fabio Quartararo	Yamaha	Qualified in Q2	1:27.973	5	2
6	5	(France) Johann Zarco	Ducati	1:28.132	1:28.007	6	2
7	10	(Italy) Luca Marini	Ducati	Qualified in Q2	1:28.029	7	3
8	43	(Australia) Jack Miller	Ducati	Qualified in Q2	1:28.116	8	3
9	72	(Italy) Marco Bezzecchi	Ducati	Qualified in Q2	1:28.185	9	3
10	42	(Spain) Álex Rins	Suzuki	1:28.347	1:28.541	10	4
11	73	(Spain) Álex Márquez	Honda	Qualified in Q2	1:28.733	11	4
12	12	(Spain) Maverick Viñales	Aprilia	Qualified in Q2	1:28.765	12	4
13	23	(Italy) Enea Bastianini	Ducati	1:28.385	N/A	13	5
14	44	(Spain) Pol Espargaró	Honda	1:28.392	N/A	14	5
15	36	(Spain) Joan Mir	Suzuki	1:28.492	N/A	15	5
16	33	(South Africa) Brad Binder	KTM	1:28.652	N/A	16	6
17	35	(United Kingdom) Cal Crutchlow	Yamaha	1:28.677	N/A	17	6
18	40	(South Africa) Darryn Binder	Yamaha	1:28.760	N/A	18	6
19	87	(Australia) Remy Gardner	KTM	1:28.820	N/A	19	7
20	49	(Italy) Fabio Di Giannantonio	Ducati	1:28.830	N/A	20	7
21	88	(Portugal) Miguel Oliveira	KTM	1:28.859	N/A	21	7
22	25	(Spain) Raúl Fernández	KTM	1:28.966	N/A	22	8
23	21	(Italy) Franco Morbidelli	Yamaha	1:29.146	N/A	23	8
24	45	(Japan) Tetsuta Nagashima	Honda	1:29.624	N/A	24	8
OFFICIAL MOTOGP QUALIFYING RESULTS

=== Moto2 ===
Fastest session lap

Pos.	No.	Biker	Constructor	Qualifying times		Final grid	Row
Pos.	No.	Biker	Constructor	Q1	Q2	Final grid	Row
1	54	(Spain) Fermín Aldeguer	Boscoscuro	Qualified in Q2	1:32.233	1	1
2	37	(Spain) Augusto Fernández	Kalex	Qualified in Q2	1:32.306	2	1
3	21	(Spain) Alonso López	Boscoscuro	Qualified in Q2	1:32.543	3	1
4	14	(Italy) Tony Arbolino	Kalex	Qualified in Q2	1:32.721	4	2
5	40	(Spain) Arón Canet	Kalex	Qualified in Q2	1:32.837	5	2
6	13	(Italy) Celestino Vietti	Kalex	1:33.392	1:32.858	6	2
7	18	(Spain) Manuel González	Kalex	1:33.162	1:32.858	7	3
8	51	(Spain) Pedro Acosta	Kalex	Qualified in Q2	1:32.872	8	3
9	52	(Spain) Jeremy Alcoba	Kalex	Qualified in Q2	1:32.946	9	3
10	12	(Czech Republic) Filip Salač	Kalex	Qualified in Q2	1:32.970	10	4
11	6	(United States) Cameron Beaubier	Kalex	Qualified in Q2	1:33.006	11	4
12	22	(United Kingdom) Sam Lowes	Kalex	Qualified in Q2	1:33.040	12	4
13	79	(Japan) Ai Ogura	Kalex	Qualified in Q2	1:33.067	13	5
14	96	(United Kingdom) Jake Dixon	Kalex	Qualified in Q2	1:33.241	14	5
15	16	(United States) Joe Roberts	Kalex	Qualified in Q2	1:33.284	15	5
16	35	(Thailand) Somkiat Chantra	Kalex	1:33.381	1:33.299	16	6
17	64	(Netherlands) Bo Bendsneyder	Kalex	Qualified in Q2	1:33.328	17	6
18	19	(Italy) Lorenzo Dalla Porta	Kalex	1:33.515	1:34.152	18	6
19	75	(Spain) Albert Arenas	Kalex	1:33.598	N/A	19	7
20	23	(Germany) Marcel Schrötter	Kalex	1:33.599	N/A	20	7
21	4	(United States) Sean Dylan Kelly	Kalex	1:33.774	N/A	21	7
22	42	(Spain) Marcos Ramírez	MV Agusta	1:33.922	N/A	22	8
23	24	(Italy) Simone Corsi	MV Agusta	1:34.011	N/A	23	8
24	9	(Spain) Jorge Navarro	Kalex	1:34.031	N/A	24	8
25	7	(Belgium) Barry Baltus	Kalex	1:34.461	N/A	25	9
26	81	(Thailand) Keminth Kubo	Kalex	1:34.501	N/A	26	9
27	28	(Italy) Niccolò Antonelli	Kalex	1:34.600	N/A	27	9
28	61	(Italy) Alessandro Zaccone	Kalex	1:34.607	N/A	28	10
29	29	(Japan) Taiga Hada	Kalex	1:35.082	N/A	29	10
OFFICIAL MOTO2 QUALIFYING RESULTS							10

=== Moto3 ===
Fastest session lap

Pos.	No.	Biker	Constructor	Qualifying times		Final grid	Row
Pos.	No.	Biker	Constructor	Q1	Q2	Final grid	Row
1	71	(Japan) Ayumu Sasaki	Husqvarna	Qualified in Q2	1:35.854	1	1
2	11	(Spain) Sergio García	Gas Gas	Qualified in Q2	1:36.041	2	1
3	48	(Spain) Iván Ortolá	KTM	Qualified in Q2	1:36.579	3	1
4	99	(Spain) Carlos Tatay	CFMoto	1:37.248	1:36.671	4	2
5	10	(Brazil) Diogo Moreira	KTM	Qualified in Q2	1:36.680	5	2
6	82	(Italy) Stefano Nepa	KTM	Qualified in Q2	1:36.690	6	2
7	28	(Spain) Izan Guevara	Gas Gas	Qualified in Q2	1:36.774	7	3
8	53	(Turkey) Deniz Öncü	KTM	Qualified in Q2	1:36.796	8	3
9	5	(Spain) Jaume Masiá	KTM	Qualified in Q2	1.36.852	9	3
10	72	(Japan) Taiyo Furusato	Honda	1:37.356	1:36.978	10	4
11	44	(Spain) David Muñoz	KTM	1:37.223	1:37.021	11	4
12	7	(Italy) Dennis Foggia	Honda	Qualified in Q2	1:37.023	12	4
13	96	(Spain) Daniel Holgado	KTM	Qualified in Q2	1:37.030	13	5
14	66	(Australia) Joel Kelso	KTM	Qualified in Q2	1:37.031	14	5
15	31	(Spain) Adrián Fernández	KTM	Qualified in Q2	1:37.107	15	5
16	17	(United Kingdom) John McPhee	Husqvarna	1:37.041	1:37.271	16	6
17	27	(Japan) Kaito Toba	KTM	Qualified in Q2	1:43.824	17	6
18	24	(Japan) Tatsuki Suzuki	Honda	Qualified in Q2	1:36.899	18	6
19	19	(United Kingdom) Scott Ogden	Honda	1:37.495	N/A	19	7
20	6	(Japan) Ryusei Yamanaka	KTM	1:37.502	N/A	20	7
21	54	(Italy) Riccardo Rossi	Honda	1:37.694	N/A	21	7
22	20	(France) Lorenzo Fellon	Honda	1:37.801	N/A	22	8
23	16	(Italy) Andrea Migno	Honda	1:37.852	N/A	23	8
24	43	(Spain) Xavier Artigas	CFMoto	1:37.864	N/A	24	8
25	67	(Italy) Alberto Surra	Honda	1:37.933	N/A	25	9
26	22	(Spain) Ana Carrasco	KTM	1:38.128	N/A	26	9
27	9	(Italy) Nicola Carraro	KTM	1:38.267	N/A	27	9
28	64	(Indonesia) Mario Aji	Honda	1:38.287	N/A	28	10
29	70	(United Kingdom) Joshua Whatley	Honda	1:38.359	N/A	29	10
30	23	(Italy) Elia Bartolini	KTM	1:38.411	N/A	30	10
OFFICIAL MOTO3 QUALIFYING RESULTS

== Race ==
=== MotoGP ===
Pos.	No.	Biker	Team	Constructor	Laps	Time/Retired	Grid	Points
1	42	(Spain) Álex Rins	Team Suzuki Ecstar	Suzuki	27	40:50.654	10	25
2	93	(Spain) Marc Márquez	Repsol Honda Team	Honda	27	+0.186	2	20
3	63	(Italy) Francesco Bagnaia	Ducati Lenovo Team	Ducati	27	+0.224	3	16
4	72	(Italy) Marco Bezzecchi	Mooney VR46 Racing Team	Ducati	27	+0.534	9	13
5	23	(Italy) Enea Bastianini	Gresini Racing MotoGP	Ducati	27	+0.557	13	11
6	10	(Italy) Luca Marini	Mooney VR46 Racing Team	Ducati	27	+0.688	7	10
7	89	(Spain) Jorge Martín	Prima Pramac Racing	Ducati	27	+0.884	1	9
8	5	(France) Johann Zarco	Prima Pramac Racing	Ducati	27	+3.141	6	8
9	41	(Spain) Aleix Espargaró	Aprilia Racing	Aprilia	27	+4.548	4	7
10	33	(South Africa) Brad Binder	Red Bull KTM Factory Racing	KTM	27	+5.940	16	6
11	44	(Spain) Pol Espargaró	Repsol Honda Team	Honda	27	+11.048	14	5
12	88	(Portugal) Miguel Oliveira	Red Bull KTM Factory Racing	KTM	27	+13.606	21	4
13	35	(United Kingdom) Cal Crutchlow	WithU Yamaha RNF MotoGP Team	Yamaha	27	+13.890	17	3
14	40	(South Africa) Darryn Binder	WithU Yamaha RNF MotoGP Team	Yamaha	27	+14.526	18	2
15	87	(Australia) Remy Gardner	Tech3 KTM Factory Racing	KTM	27	+19.470	19	1
16	25	(Spain) Raúl Fernández	Tech3 KTM Factory Racing	KTM	27	+20.645	22	
17	12	(Spain) Maverick Viñales	Aprilia Racing	Aprilia	27	+22.167	12	
18	36	(Spain) Joan Mir	Team Suzuki Ecstar	Suzuki	27	+23.489	15	
19	45	(Japan) Tetsuta Nagashima	LCR Honda Idemitsu	Honda	27	+39.618	24	
20	49	(Italy) Fabio Di Giannantonio	Gresini Racing MotoGP	Ducati	27	+39.633	20	
Ret	21	(Italy) Franco Morbidelli	Monster Energy Yamaha MotoGP	Yamaha	21	Accident	23	
Ret	20	(France) Fabio Quartararo	Monster Energy Yamaha MotoGP	Yamaha	10	Accident	5	
Ret	43	(Australia) Jack Miller	Ducati Lenovo Team	Ducati	8	Collision	8	
Ret	73	(Spain) Álex Márquez	LCR Honda Castrol	Honda	8	Collision	11	
Fastest lap: (France) Johann Zarco (Ducati) – 1:29.622 (lap 13)
OFFICIAL MOTOGP RACE REPORT

=== Moto2 ===
Pos.	No.	Biker	Constructor	Laps	Time/Retired	Grid	Points
1	21	(Spain) Alonso López	Boscoscuro	25	39:14.947	3	25
2	51	(Spain) Pedro Acosta	Kalex	25	+3.556	8	20
3	96	(United Kingdom) Jake Dixon	Kalex	25	+9.583	14	16
4	54	(Spain) Fermín Aldeguer	Boscoscuro	25	+15.745	1	13
5	18	(Spain) Manuel González	Kalex	25	+15.775	7	11
6	52	(Spain) Jeremy Alcoba	Kalex	25	+15.892	9	10
7	6	(United States) Cameron Beaubier	Kalex	25	+16.034	11	9
8	35	(Thailand) Somkiat Chantra	Kalex	25	+17.949	16	8
9	40	(Spain) Arón Canet	Kalex	25	+24.817	5	7
10	64	(Netherlands) Bo Bendsneyder	Kalex	25	+30.652	17	6
11	79	(Japan) Ai Ogura	Kalex	25	+32.981	13	5
12	22	(United Kingdom) Sam Lowes	Kalex	25	+34.407	12	4
13	23	(Germany) Marcel Schrötter	Kalex	25	+47.584	20	3
14	75	(Spain) Albert Arenas	Kalex	25	+47.608	19	2
15	29	(Japan) Taiga Hada	Kalex	25	+48.028	29	1
16	61	(Italy) Alessandro Zaccone	Kalex	25	+53.827	28	
17	42	(Spain) Marcos Ramírez	MV Agusta	25	+54.356	22	
18	4	(United States) Sean Dylan Kelly	Kalex	25	+54.637	21	
Ret	16	(United States) Joe Roberts	Kalex	23	Mechanical	15	
Ret	7	(Belgium) Barry Baltus	Kalex	17	Accident	25	
Ret	37	(Spain) Augusto Fernández	Kalex	15	Accident	2	
Ret	13	(Italy) Celestino Vietti	Kalex	12	Accident	6	
Ret	12	(Czech Republic) Filip Salač	Kalex	10	Accident	10	
Ret	81	(Thailand) Keminth Kubo	Kalex	10	Accident	26	
Ret	28	(Italy) Niccolò Antonelli	Kalex	10	Accident	27	
Ret	19	(Italy) Lorenzo Dalla Porta	Kalex	8	Mechanical	18	
Ret	14	(Italy) Tony Arbolino	Kalex	6	Accident	4	
Ret	24	(Italy) Simone Corsi	MV Agusta	3	Collision	23	
Ret	9	(Spain) Jorge Navarro	Kalex	3	Collision	24	
WD	84	(Netherlands) Zonta van den Goorbergh	Kalex		Withdrew		
Fastest lap: (Spain) Alonso López (Kalex) – 1:33.030 (lap 3)
OFFICIAL MOTO2 RACE REPORT

- Zonta van den Goorbergh suffered a broken wrist in crash during FP1 and withdrew from the event.

=== Moto3 ===
Pos.	No.	Biker	Constructor	Laps	Time/Retired	Grid	Points
1	28	(Spain) Izan Guevara	Gas Gas	23	37:38.762	7	25
2	53	(Turkey) Deniz Öncü	KTM	23	+0.345	8	20
3	11	(Spain) Sergio García	Gas Gas	23	+0.460	2	16
4	71	(Japan) Ayumu Sasaki	Husqvarna	23	+0.560	1	13
5	82	(Italy) Stefano Nepa	KTM	23	+7.428	6	11
6	17	(United Kingdom) John McPhee	Husqvarna	23	+7.496	16	10
7	10	(Brazil) Diogo Moreira	KTM	23	+7.574	5	9
8	66	(Australia) Joel Kelso	KTM	23	+7.575	14	8
9	7	(Italy) Dennis Foggia	Honda	23	+16.794	12	7
10	54	(Italy) Riccardo Rossi	Honda	23	+16.831	21	6
11	44	(Spain) David Muñoz	KTM	23	+17.066	11	5
12	99	(Spain) Carlos Tatay	CFMoto	23	+17.768	4	4
13	48	(Spain) Iván Ortolá	KTM	23	+17.884	3	3
14	43	(Spain) Xavier Artigas	CFMoto	23	+21.354	24	2
15	5	(Spain) Jaume Masià	KTM	23	+22.414	9	1
16	16	(Italy) Andrea Migno	Honda	23	+40.095	23	
17	27	(Japan) Kaito Toba	KTM	23	+41.799	17	
18	31	(Spain) Adrián Fernández	KTM	23	+41.826	15	
19	20	(France) Lorenzo Fellon	Honda	23	+41.828	22	
20	23	(Italy) Elia Bartolini	KTM	23	+41.837	30	
21	70	(United Kingdom) Joshua Whatley	Honda	23	+41.946	29	
22	9	(Italy) Nicola Carraro	KTM	23	+42.006	27	
23	22	(Spain) Ana Carrasco	KTM	23	+42.753	26	
24	67	(Italy) Alberto Surra	Honda	23	+54.640	25	
Ret	6	(Japan) Ryusei Yamanaka	KTM	22	Accident	20	
Ret	64	(Indonesia) Mario Aji	Honda	21	Accident	28	
Ret	24	(Japan) Tatsuki Suzuki	Honda	18	Accident	18	
Ret	19	(United Kingdom) Scott Ogden	Honda	12	Accident	19	
Ret	96	(Spain) Daniel Holgado	KTM	1	Accident	13	
Ret	72	(Japan) Taiyo Furusato	Honda	1	Accident	10	
Fastest lap: (United Kingdom) John McPhee (Husqvarna) – 1:36.886 (lap 8)
OFFICIAL MOTO3 RACE REPORT

== Championship standings after the race ==
Below are the standings for the top five riders, constructors, and teams after the round.

=== MotoGP ===
Riders' Championship standings

+/–	Pos.	Rider	Points
1	1	(Italy) Francesco Bagnaia	233
1	2	(France) Fabio Quartararo	219
	3	(Spain) Aleix Espargaró	206
	4	(Italy) Enea Bastianini	191
	5	(Australia) Jack Miller	179

Constructors' Championship standings

Pos.	Constructor	Points
1	(Italy) Ducati	407
2	(Italy) Aprilia	242
3	(Japan) Yamaha	227
4	(Austria) KTM	212
5	(Japan) Suzuki	163

Teams' Championship standings

Pos.	Team	Points
1	(Italy) Ducati Lenovo Team	412
2	(Italy) Aprilia Racing	328
3	(Austria) Red Bull KTM Factory Racing	295
4	(Italy) Prima Pramac Racing	295
5	(Japan) Monster Energy Yamaha MotoGP	250

=== Moto2 ===
Riders' Championship standings

	Pos.	Rider	Points
1	1	(Japan) Ai Ogura	242
1	2	(Spain) Augusto Fernández	238.5
	3	(Spain) Arón Canet	192
	4	(Italy) Celestino Vietti	165
1	5	(Spain) Pedro Acosta	152

Constructors' Championship standings

Pos.	Constructor	Points
1	(Germany) Kalex	427.5
2	(Italy) Boscoscuro	167.5
3	(Italy) MV Agusta	5

Teams' Championship standings

	Pos.	Team	Points
	1	(Finland) Red Bull KTM Ajo	390.5
	2	(Japan) Idemitsu Honda Team Asia	370
	3	(Spain) Flexbox HP40	275
1	4	(Spain) Inde GasGas Aspar Team	219.5
1	5	(Belgium) Elf Marc VDS Racing Team	205.5

=== Moto3 ===
Riders' Championship standings

	Pos.	Rider	Points
	1	(Spain) Izan Guevara	290
1	2	(Spain) Sergio García	225
1	3	(Italy) Dennis Foggia	223
	4	(Japan) Ayumu Sasaki	207
1	5	(Turkey) Deniz Öncü	174

Constructors' Championship standings

Pos.	Constructor	Points
1	(Spain) Gas Gas	348
2	(Japan) Honda	307
3	(Austria) KTM	290
4	(Sweden) Husqvarna	243
5	(China) CFMoto	122

Teams' Championship standings

Pos.	Team	Points
1	(Spain) Gaviota GasGas Aspar Team	515
2	(Luxembourg) Leopard Racing	351
3	(Italy) Sterilgarda Husqvarna Max	279
4	(Finland) Red Bull KTM Ajo	252
5	(France) Red Bull KTM Tech3	214

Previous race: 2022 Thailand Grand Prix	FIM Grand Prix World Championship; 2022 season	Next race: 2022 Malaysian Grand Prix
Previous race: 2019 Australian Grand Prix	Australian motorcycle Grand Prix	Next race: 2023 Australian Grand Prix
