= Max Cook =

British motorcycle racer

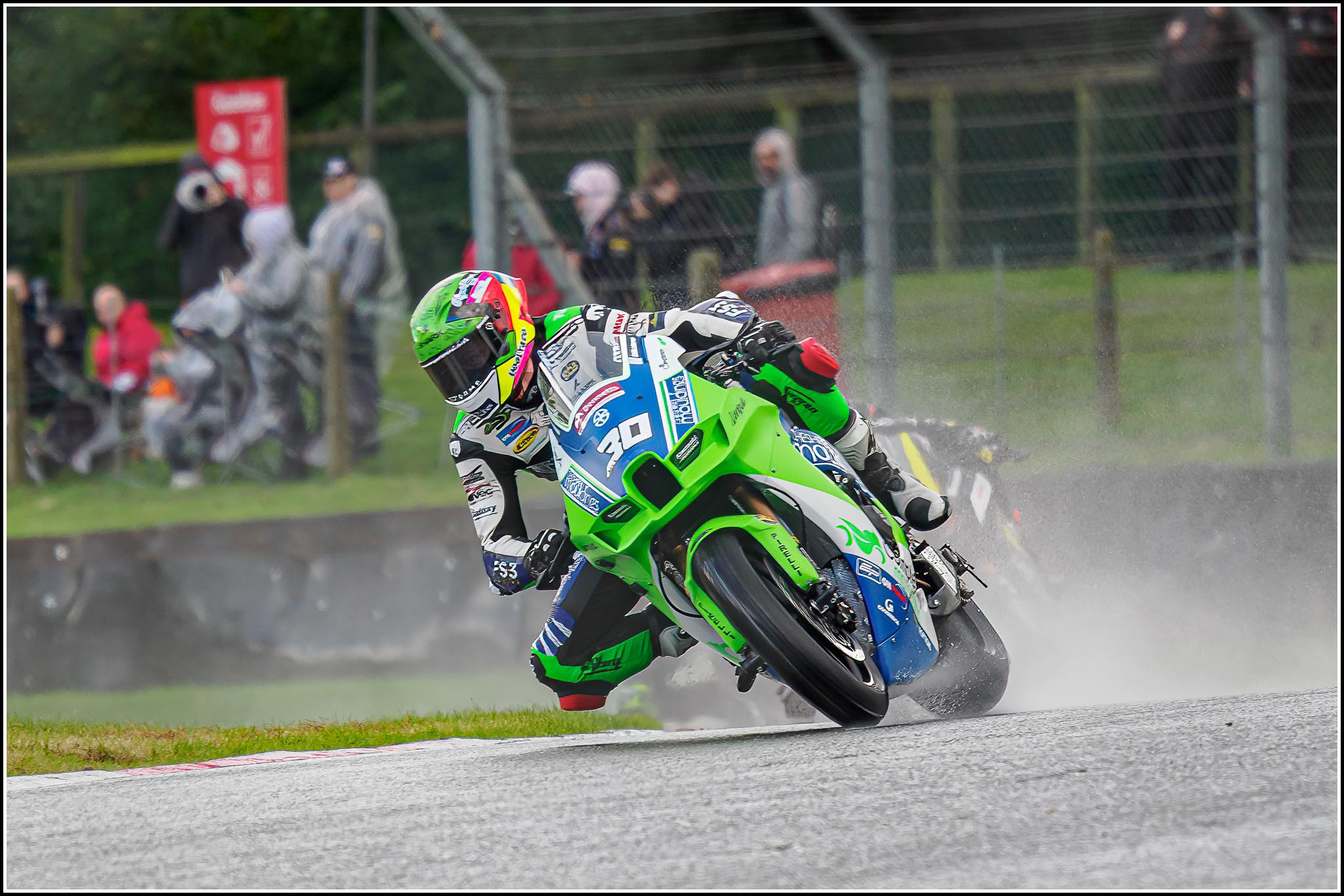
- Max Cook riding for Cheshire Mouldings Kawasaki at Brands Hatch in 2023
- Nationality: British
- Born: 9 December 2002 (age 23); Bristol, England
- Current team: AJN Steelstock Kawasaki
- Bike number: 30
- Website: Max Cook Official
Motorcycle racing career statistics
Moto3 World Championship
Active years	2025
Manufacturers	Honda (2025)
Championships	0
2025 championship position	40th (0 pts)
Starts / Wins / Podiums / Poles / F. laps / Points; 1 / 0 / 0 / 0 / 0 / 0
British Superbike Championship
Active years	2023–
Manufacturers	Kawasaki, Bimota
2025 championship position	9th (270 pts)
Starts / Wins / Podiums / Poles / F. laps / Points; 132 / 0 / 10 / 3 / 2 / 945
British Supersport Championship
Active years	2022
Manufacturers	Yamaha
2022 championship position	27th (13 pts)
Starts / Wins / Podiums / Poles / F. laps / Points; 2 / 0 / 0 / 0 / 0 / 13

Max Cook (born 9 December 2002) is a professional road racer of solo motorcycles. In 2023, he rode in the British Superbike Championship with Cheshire Mouldings FS-3 Kawasaki.

For 2021, Cook raced in the Pirelli National Junior Superstock Championship, earning status as Rookie of the Year in the championship with 8th place in the standings. He remained in the championship the following year with the Binch Racing Team, where he won the title by 50 points over Franco Bourne. 2022 also saw him make a wildcard appearance at the final round of that year's British Supersport Championship in a collaboration between the Binch Racing Team and Carl Cox Motorsport.

Cook had previously raced in the FIM CEV Moto3 Junior World Championship alongside fellow Briton Scott Ogden for the British Talent Team. He placed 25th at the end of his rookie season in 2019, before improving to a 13th-place finish the following year. In 2018, Cook was selected to compete in the Red Bull MotoGP Rookies Cup, finishing his rookie 2018 season in 18th place. His second season in 2019 saw him end the season in 9th place, including a podium in race 2 of the Sachsenring round.

== Racing achievements ==
2014 – British FAB Racing Championship – 3rd

2015 – British Junior Pitbike Championship – 2nd

2015 – Aprilia Superteen Championship – 1st

2016 – British Junior Pitbike Championship – 2nd

2016 – British Open Class Moto3 Championship – 9th

2017 – British Junior Pitbike Championship – 1st

2017 – British Standard Class Moto3 Championship – 1st

2018 – British Talent Cup – 3rd

2018 – Red Bull MotoGP Rookies Cup – 18th

2019 – Red Bull MotoGP Rookies Cup – 9th

2019 – FIM CEV Moto3 Junior World Championship – 25th

2020 – FIM CEV Moto3 Junior World Championship – 13th

2021 – British Junior Superstock 600 – 8th

2022 – British Junior Superstock 600 – 1st

2023 – British Superbike Championship – 14th

2024 – British Superbike Championship – 12th

== Career statistics ==
=== Red Bull MotoGP Rookies Cup ===
==== Races by year ====
(key) (Races in bold indicate pole position, and races in italics indicate fastest lap)

Year	1	2	3	4	5	6	7	8	9	10	11	12	Pos	Pts
2018	SPA1; 13	SPA2; 20	MUG; Ret	NED1; 15	NED2; 11	GER1; 8	GER2; NC	RBR1; Ret	RBR2; DNS	MIS; 16	ARA1; 12	ARA2; 14	18th	23
2019	SPA1; 11	SPA2; 8	MUG; 13	NED1; Ret	NED2; 4	GER1; 9	GER2; 3	RBR1; 10	RBR2; 9	MIS; 11	ARA1; 7	ARA2; 12	9th	83

=== FIM CEV Moto3 Junior World Championship ===
==== Races by year ====
(key) (Races in bold indicate pole position; races in italics indicate fastest lap)

Year	Bike	1	2	3	4	5	6	7	8	9	10	11	12	Pos	Pts
2019	Honda	EST; 13	VAL1; 15	VAL2; Ret	FRA; 18	CAT1; 13	CAT2; 13	ARA; 16	JER1; 16	JER2; 17	ALB; 16	VAL1; 15	VAL2; 11	25th	16
2020	Honda	EST; 7	POR; 7	JER1; Ret	JER2; DNS	JER3; DNS	ARA1; 5	ARA2; 11	ARA3; 11	VAL1; Ret	VAL1; 14	VAL1; 12		13th	45

=== British Supersport Championship ===
==== By year ====
Year	Bike	1		2		3		4		5		6		7		8		9		10		11		Pos	Pts
Year	Bike	SR	FR	SR	FR	SR	FR	SR	FR	SR	FR	SR	FR	SR	FR	SR	FR	SR	FR	SR	FR	SR	FR	Pos	Pts
2022	Yamaha	SIL	SIL	OUL	OUL	DON	DON	KNO	KNO	BRH	BRH	THR	THR	CAD	CAD	SNE	SNE	OUL	OUL	DON	DON	BRH; 11	BRH; 9	27th	13

=== British Superbike Championship ===
==== By year ====
Year	Bike	1			2			3			4			5			6			7			8				9			10			11			Pos	Pts
Year	Bike	R1	R2	R3	R1	R2	R3	R1	R2	R3	R1	R2	R3	R1	R2	R3	R1	R2	R3	R1	R2	R3	R1	R2	R3	R4	R1	R2	R3	R1	R2	R3	R1	R2	R3	Pos	Pts
2023	Kawasaki	SIL; 20	SIL; 21	SIL; 20	OUL; 20	OUL; 14	OUL; 17	DON; 11	DON; 12	DON; Ret	KNO; 18	KNO; Ret	KNO; 14	SNE; 11	SNE; 14	SNE; 13	BRH; 10	BRH; 14	BRH; 10	THR; 4	THR; Ret	THR; 4	CAD; WD	CAD; WD	CAD; WD		OUL; 11	OUL; 13	OUL; 13	DON; 13	DON; 9	DON; 18	BRH; 13	BRH; 7	BRH; 11	15th	114
2024	Kawasaki	NAV; 8	NAV; 7		OUL; Ret	OUL; 10	OUL; 9	DON; 6	DON; Ret	DON; 10	KNO; Ret	KNO; 10	KNO; Ret	SNE; Ret	SNE; 13	SNE; 12	BRH; 12	BRH; 13	BRH; 12	THR; 8	**THR**; 2	THR; Ret	CAD; 16	CAD; 16	CAD; 14		OUL; 10	OUL; 15	OUL; 4	DON; 12	DON; 9	DON; 8	BRH; 6	BRH; 7	BRH; 5	12th	203
2025	Kawasaki	OUL; Ret	OUL; 12	OUL; C	DON; Ret	DON; 9	DON; 10	SNE; 7	SNE; 9	SNE; 8	KNO; 14	KNO; 15	KNO; 6	BRH; 7	BRH; 5	BRH; 8	THR; 3	**THR**; 5	THR; 9	CAD; 6	CAD; 5	CAD; 5	DON; 11	DON; 13	DON; 8	DON; 6	ASS; Ret	ASS; 11	ASS; 11	OUL; 7	OUL; 9	OUL; 8	BRH; 6	BRH; 6	BRH; 7	9th	270
2026	Bimota	OUL; 6	OUL; 6	OUL; 7	DON; 2	DON; 3	DON; 3	KNO; Ret	KNO; 5	KNO; 7	SNE; Ret	SNE; 2	SNE; Ret	BRH; 3	BRH; 3	BRH; 3	**OUL**; Ret	OUL; 5	OUL; 6	THR; Ret	THR; WD	THR; WD	CAD; 7	CAD; 7	CAD; 8		ASS; 8	ASS; 5	ASS; 5	DON; 5	DON; 5	DON; 2	BRH; 5	BRH; 6	BRH; 5	6th	358

=== Grand Prix motorcycle racing ===
==== By season ====
Season	Class	Motorcycle	Team	Race	Win	Podium	Pole	FLap	Pts	Plcd
2025	Moto3	Honda	Gryd – MLav Racing	1	0	0	0	0	0	40th
Total				**1**	**0**	**0**	**0**	**0**	**0**	

==== By class ====
Class	Seasons	1st GP	1st pod	1st win	Race	Win	Podiums	Pole	FLap	Pts	WChmp
Moto3	2025–present	2025 British			1	0	0	0	0	0*	0
Total	2025–present				**1**	**0**	**0**	**0**	**0**	**0**	

==== Races by year ====
(key) (Races in bold indicate pole position; races in italics indicate fastest lap)

Year	Class	Bike	1	2	3	4	5	6	7	8	9	10	11	12	13	14	15	16	17	18	19	20	21	22	Pos	Pts
2025	Moto3	Honda	THA	ARG	AME	QAT	SPA	FRA	GBR; 21	ARA	ITA	NED	GER	CZE	AUT	HUN	CAT	RSM	JPN	INA	AUS	MAL	POR	VAL	40th	0

* Season still in progress.
