= List of Grand Prix motorcycle racers: Q =

Name	Seasons	World Championships	MotoGP Wins	500cc Wins	350cc Wins	Moto2 Wins	250cc Wins	Moto3 Wins	125cc Wins	80cc Wins	50cc Wins	MotoE Wins
(France) Fabio Quartararo	2015-	1 MotoGP - 2021	11	0	0	1	0	0	0	0	0	0
(Spain) Máximo Quiles	2025-	0	0	0	0	0	0	14	0	0	0	0
(Australia) Maurice Quincey	1954-1955	0	0	0	0	0	0	0	0	0	0	0
(Australia) Ray Quincey	1978	0	0	0	0	0	0	0	0	0	0	0
(Spain) Ricardo Quintanilla	1961	0	0	0	0	0	0	0	0	0	0	0
