= 2020 FIM CEV Moto3 Junior World Championship =

Motorcycle racing competition

2020 FIM CEV Moto3 Junior World Championship
Previous:	2019	Next:	2021
Support series: FIM CEV Moto2 European Championship; European Talent Cup

The 2020 FIM CEV Moto3 Junior World Championship was the ninth CEV Moto3 season and the seventh under the FIM.

== Calendar ==
The calendar was published in November 2019; a revised schedule was released on 16 June 2020 as a result of delays caused by the COVID-19 pandemic.

Round	Date	Circuit	Pole position	Fastest lap	Race winner	Winning constructor
1	7 July	(Portugal) Estoril	(Spain) David Salvador	(Spain) Xavier Artigas	(Spain) Xavier Artigas	(Japan) Honda
2	13 July	(Portugal) Portimão	(Spain) Pedro Acosta	(United Kingdom) Max Cook	(Spain) Pedro Acosta	(Austria) KTM
3	29 August	(Spain) Jerez	(Spain) Daniel Muñoz	(Spain) Daniel Holgado	(Spain) Xavier Artigas	(Japan) Honda
4	30 August	(Spain) Jerez	(Spain) Daniel Muñoz	(Spain) Pedro Acosta	(Spain) Izan Guevara	(Austria) KTM
4	30 August	(Spain) Jerez	(Spain) Daniel Muñoz	(Spain) José Julián García	(Spain) José Julián García	(Japan) Honda
5	3 October	(Spain) Aragón	(Spain) Daniel Holgado	(France) Lorenzo Fellon	(Spain) Izan Guevara	(Austria) KTM
6	4 October	(Spain) Aragón	(Spain) Daniel Holgado	(Spain) Izan Guevara	(Spain) Izan Guevara	(Austria) KTM
6	4 October	(Spain) Aragón	(Spain) Daniel Holgado	(Spain) Izan Guevara	(Spain) Izan Guevara	(Austria) KTM
7	31 October	(Spain) Valencia	(Spain) Pedro Acosta	(Spain) Izan Guevara	(Spain) Izan Guevara	(Austria) KTM
8	1 November	(Spain) Valencia	(Spain) Pedro Acosta	(Spain) Izan Guevara	(Spain) Pedro Acosta	(Austria) KTM
8	1 November	(Spain) Valencia	(Spain) Pedro Acosta	(Spain) Izan Guevara	(Spain) Pedro Acosta	(Austria) KTM

=== Calendar changes ===
- The round at Albacete was replaced with a round at Portimão.
- The round supporting the French Grand Prix at Le Mans was replaced with a round at Misano supporting the San Marino Grand Prix.
- Due to the COVID-19 pandemic, the rounds at Barcelona and Misano were dropped.

== Entry list ==
Team	Constructor	No.	Rider	Rounds
(Spain) Junior Team Estrella Galicia 0,0	Honda	5	(France) Lorenzo Fellon	All
(Spain) Junior Team Estrella Galicia 0,0	Honda	92	(Brazil) Diogo Moreira	All
(Spain) Junior Team Estrella Galicia 0,0	Honda	95	(Spain) José Antonio Rueda	All
(Spain) Apex Cardoso Racing	KTM	7	(Spain) Daniel Muñoz	All
(Spain) Apex Cardoso Racing	KTM	64	(Spain) David Muñoz	All
(Italy) Reale Avintia MTA Junior Team	KTM	11	(Italy) Nicholas Spinelli	1–6
(Italy) Reale Avintia MTA Junior Team	KTM	21	(Spain) Vicente Pérez	7–8
(Italy) Reale Avintia MTA Junior Team	KTM	69	(Italy) Raffaele Fusco	All
(Italy) Junior Team Total Gresini	Honda	11	(Italy) Nicholas Spinelli	7–8
(Spain) Team MT-Foundation77	KTM	13	(Japan) Sho Nishimura	3–8
(Spain) Team MT-Foundation77	KTM	37	(Spain) Pedro Acosta	All
(Spain) Team MT-Foundation77	KTM	76	(Spain) Julián Giral	1–6
(Spain) Team MT-Foundation77	KTM	88	(Russia) Artem Maraev	7–8
(Italy) SIC58 Squadra Corse	Honda	20	(Spain) José Julián García	All
(Italy) SIC58 Squadra Corse	Honda	81	(Australia) Senna Agius	All
(Spain) Laglisse Academy	Husqvarna	22	(Japan) Kazuki Masaki	All
(Spain) Laglisse Academy	Husqvarna	25	(Spain) Adrián Fernández	All
(Spain) Laglisse Academy	Husqvarna	27	(Spain) Alejandro Díez	All
(Spain) Laglisse Academy	Husqvarna	45	(France) Clément Rougé	All
(Spain) Laglisse Academy	Husqvarna	47	(Czech Republic) Filip Řeháček	All
(Spain) Laglisse Academy	Husqvarna	71	(Italy) Filippo Farioli	7–8
(Luxembourg) Leopard Impala Junior Team	Honda	24	(Italy) Leonardo Taccini	All
(Luxembourg) Leopard Impala Junior Team	Honda	43	(Spain) Xavier Artigas	All
(Luxembourg) Leopard Impala Junior Team	Honda	97	(Italy) Filippo Maria Palazzi	5–8
(Spain) Openbank Aspar Team	KTM	28	(Spain) Izan Guevara	All
(Spain) Openbank Aspar Team	KTM	50	(Czech Republic) Ondřej Vostatek	All
(Spain) Openbank Aspar Team	KTM	96	(Spain) Daniel Holgado	All
(Japan) Asia Talent Team	Honda	29	(Australia) Bill van Eerde	1–4
(Japan) Asia Talent Team	Honda	32	(Japan) Takuma Matsuyama	All
(United Kingdom) British Talent Team	Honda	30	(United Kingdom) Max Cook	All
(United Kingdom) British Talent Team	Honda	31	(United Kingdom) Scott Ogden	All
(Japan) AP Honda	Honda	33	(Thailand) Tatchakorn Buasri	3–8
(Japan) Astra Honda Racing Team	Honda	34	(Indonesia) Mario Aji	3–8
(France) CIP Junior Team	KTM	36	(Japan) Sho Hasegawa	5–6
(France) CIP Junior Team	KTM	65	(Japan) Hikaru Arita	1–4
(Spain) Cuna de Campeones	KTM	38	(Spain) David Salvador	All
(Germany) Cuna de Campeones Prüstel GP	KTM	60	(Germany) Dirk Geiger	All
(France) Larresport Carré d'Or	Honda	48	(France) Gabin Planques	All
(Italy) FM Motorsport Racing Emotion	KTM	51	(Italy) Angelo Tagliarini	7–8
(Spain) Monlau Motorsport	Honda	63	(Malaysia) Syarifuddin Azman	All
(Spain) AGR Team	KTM	66	(Australia) Joel Kelso	All
(Spain) AGR Team	KTM	67	(Spain) Gerard Riu	All
(United Kingdom) KRP (UK) Ltd	KTM	70	(United Kingdom) Joshua Whatley	All
(Spain) FAU55 Tey Racing	KTM	97	(Italy) Filippo Maria Palazzi	1–4
Entry lists:

- All entries used Dunlop tyres.

== Championship standings ==
Scoring system

Points were awarded to the top fifteen finishers. A rider had to finish the race to earn points.

Position	**1st**	**2nd**	**3rd**	**4th**	**5th**	**6th**	**7th**	**8th**	**9th**	**10th**	**11th**	**12th**	**13th**	**14th**	**15th**
Points	25	20	16	13	11	10	9	8	7	6	5	4	3	2	1

=== Riders' championship ===
Pos	Rider	Bike	EST (Portugal)	POR (Portugal)	JER (Spain)			ARA (Spain)			VAL (Spain)			Points
1	(Spain) Izan Guevara	KTM	8	13	8	1	2	1	1	1	1	3	3	196
2	(Spain) Xavier Artigas	Honda	1	2	1	2	8	2	5	2	21	2	2	189
3	(Spain) Pedro Acosta	KTM	2	**1**	Ret	3	3	Ret	2	6	**2**	**1**	**1**	177
4	(Spain) José Julián García	Honda	4	5	7	9	1	3	3	5	5	5	Ret	130
5	(Spain) Daniel Holgado	KTM	5	4	2	4	Ret	**Ret**	**4**	**4**	3	4	4	125
6	(Spain) David Salvador	KTM	**6**	3	4	Ret	7	6	7	3	Ret	6	5	104
7	(Spain) Adrián Fernández	Husqvarna	3	6	Ret	5	26	7	6	Ret	7	8	10	79
8	(Spain) Gerard Riu	KTM	11	8	3	Ret	4	10	12	9	Ret	9	9	73
9	(Japan) Kazuki Masaki	Husqvarna	10	Ret	Ret	6	5	8	8	8	16	15	15	53
10	(Brazil) Diogo Moreira	Honda	14	11	5	7	6	28	9	Ret	Ret	18	11	49
11	(France) Lorenzo Fellon	Honda	24	17	Ret	14	9	4	10	7	15	10	13	47
12	(Spain) José Antonio Rueda	Honda	22	22	6	12	11	12	13	10	Ret	11	7	46
13	(United Kingdom) Max Cook	Honda	7	7	Ret	DNS	DNS	5	11	11	Ret	14	12	45
14	(Japan) Takuma Matsuyama	Honda	9	29	Ret	28	12	9	14	19	4	Ret	6	43
15	(United Kingdom) Scott Ogden	Honda	Ret	10	Ret	11	10	Ret	19	13	12	Ret	8	32
16	(Indonesia) Mario Aji	Honda			DNS	DNS	DNS	22	Ret	12	6	7	Ret	23
17	(Spain) Daniel Muñoz	KTM	25	12	**22**	**8**	**Ret**	15	17	27	8	17	Ret	21
18	(Australia) Joel Kelso	KTM	21	20	11	Ret	DNS	20	16	Ret	9	12	14	18
19	(Malaysia) Syarifuddin Azman	Honda	Ret	14	9	13	15	18	23	20	11	16	Ret	18
20	(Spain) David Muñoz	KTM	12	Ret	Ret	10	Ret	11	15	16	17	Ret	Ret	16
21	(Thailand) Tatchakorn Buasri	Honda			14	18	22	14	24	18	10	19	Ret	10
22	(Australia) Billy van Eerde	Honda	Ret	9	DNS	DNS	DNS							7
23	(France) Clément Rougé	Husqvarna	19	19	10	19	19	26	25	17	20	24	17	6
24	(Spain) Vicente Pérez	KTM									13	13	Ret	6
25	(Spain) Julián Giral	KTM	Ret	26	13	27	13	DNS	DNS	DNS				6
26	(United Kingdom) Joshua Whatley	KTM	15	21	12	21	21	Ret	26	23	22	Ret	18	5
27	(Italy) Nicholas Spinelli	KTM	13	15	Ret	22	Ret	17	22	Ret				4
27	(Italy) Nicholas Spinelli	Honda									Ret	20	20	4
28	(Germany) Dirk Geiger	KTM	Ret	18	Ret	24	25	21	18	14	14	Ret	21	4
29	(Australia) Senna Agius	Honda	20	16	17	17	18	13	Ret	Ret	18	21	16	3
30	(Italy) Leonardo Taccini	Honda	Ret	30	15	15	16	16	17	15	27	Ret	DNS	3
31	(Czech Republic) Ondřej Vostatek	KTM	18	25	DNS	16	14	19	21	21	19	22	19	2
	(France) Gabin Planques	Honda	16	24	Ret	25	20	Ret	DNS	DNS	DNS	DNS	DNS	0
	(Japan) Hikaru Arita	KTM	17	28	19	23	17							0
	(Italy) Raffaele Fusco	KTM	Ret	23	18	20	27	Ret	28	Ret	25	25	22	0
	(Spain) Alejandro Díez	Husqvarna	Ret	27	20	26	24	23	27	25	26	Ret	DNS	0
	(Czech Republic) Filip Řeháček	Husqvarna	23	31	21	Ret	DNS	27	30	26	WD	WD	WD	0
	(Italy) Filippo Maria Palazzi	KTM	Ret	Ret	23	Ret	DNS							0
	(Italy) Filippo Maria Palazzi	Honda						24	31	22	24	23	Ret	0
	(Russia) Artem Maraev	KTM									23	26	Ret	0
	(Japan) Sho Hasegawa	KTM						25	29	24				0
	(Italy) Angelo Tagliarini	KTM									28	27	Ret	0
	(Italy) Filippo Farioli	Husqvarna									Ret	DNS	DNS	0
	(Japan) Sho Nishimura	KTM			DNS	DNS	DNS	DNS	DNS	DNS	WD	WD	WD	
Pos	Rider	Bike	EST (Portugal)	POR (Portugal)	JER (Spain)			ARA (Spain)			VAL (Spain)			Points

Colour	Result
Gold	Winner
Silver	Second place
Bronze	Third place
Green	Points classification
Blue	Non-points classification
Blue	Non-classified finish (NC)
Purple	Retired, not classified (Ret)
Red	Did not qualify (DNQ)
Red	Did not pre-qualify (DNPQ)
Black	Disqualified (DSQ)
White	Did not start (DNS)
White	Withdrew (WD)
White	Race cancelled (C)
Blank	Did not practice (DNP)
Blank	Did not arrive (DNA)
Blank	Excluded (EX)

**Bold** – Pole position
Italics – Fastest lap

=== Constructors' championship ===
Pos	Constructor	EST (Portugal)	POR (Portugal)	JER (Spain)			ARA (Spain)			VAL (Spain)			Points
1	(Austria) KTM	2	1	2	1	2	1	1	1	1	1	1	260
2	(Japan) Honda	1	2	1	2	1	2	3	2	4	2	2	224
3	(Sweden) Husqvarna	3	6	10	5	5	7	6	8	7	8	10	104
Pos	Constructor	EST (Portugal)	POR (Portugal)	JER (Spain)			ARA (Spain)			VAL (Spain)			Points
