= 2019 FIM CEV Moto3 Junior World Championship =

2019 FIM CEV Moto3 Junior World Championship
Previous:	2018	Next:	2020
Support series: FIM CEV Moto2 European Championship; European Talent Cup

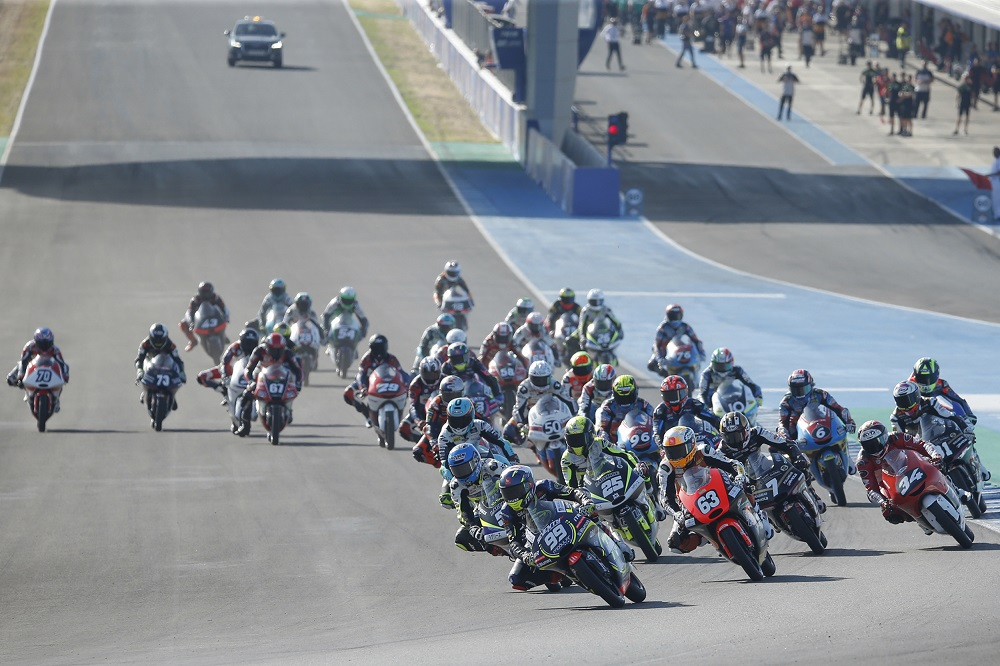
Race start at Valencia

The 2019 FIM CEV Moto3 Junior World Championship was the eighth CEV Moto3 season and the sixth under the FIM.

== Calendar ==
The following races took place in 2019.

Round	Date	Circuit	Pole position	Fastest lap	Race winner	Winning constructor
1	7 April	(Portugal) Estoril	(Spain) Jeremy Alcoba	(Indonesia) Mario Aji	(Belgium) Barry Baltus	(Austria) KTM
2	28 April	(Spain) Valencia	(Japan) Yuki Kunii	(Turkey) Deniz Öncü	(Japan) Yuki Kunii	(Japan) Honda
2	28 April	(Spain) Valencia	(Japan) Yuki Kunii	(Spain) Daniel Holgado	(Japan) Ryusei Yamanaka	(Japan) Honda
3	18 May	(France) Le Mans	(Japan) Yuki Kunii	(Spain) Julián Giral	(Japan) Yuki Kunii	(Japan) Honda
4	9 June	(Spain) Catalunya	(Turkey) Deniz Öncü	(Spain) Carlos Tatay	(Spain) Carlos Tatay	(Austria) KTM
4	9 June	(Spain) Catalunya	(Turkey) Deniz Öncü	(Japan) Ryusei Yamanaka	(Spain) Jeremy Alcoba	(Sweden) Husqvarna
5	14 July	(Spain) Aragón	(Spain) Jeremy Alcoba	(Japan) Ryusei Yamanaka	(Spain) Xavier Artigas	(Japan) Honda
6	29 September	(Spain) Jerez	(Spain) Carlos Tatay	(Spain) Xavier Artigas	(Spain) Carlos Tatay	(Austria) KTM
6	29 September	(Spain) Jerez	(Spain) Carlos Tatay	(Spain) Carlos Tatay	(Spain) Carlos Tatay	(Austria) KTM
7	13 October	(Spain) Albacete	(Spain) Jeremy Alcoba	(Spain) Daniel Holgado	(Spain) Jeremy Alcoba	(Sweden) Husqvarna
8	10 November	(Spain) Valencia	(Italy) Davide Pizzoli	(Italy) Davide Pizzoli	(Spain) Jeremy Alcoba	(Sweden) Husqvarna
8	10 November	(Spain) Valencia	(Italy) Davide Pizzoli	(Spain) Xavier Artigas	(Spain) Carlos Tatay	(Austria) KTM

== Entry list ==
Team	Constructor	No.	Rider	Rounds
(Japan) Asia Talent Team	Honda	31	(Australia) Bill van Eerde	2-8
(Japan) Asia Talent Team	Honda	32	(Japan) Haruki Noguchi	2-8
(Japan) Asia Talent Team	Honda	33	(Japan) Yuki Kunii	1-3, 5, 8
(Indonesia) Astra Honda Racing Team	Honda	34	(Indonesia) Mario Aji	1-3, 5-8
(United Kingdom) British Talent Team	Honda	30	(United Kingdom) Max Cook	All
(United Kingdom) British Talent Team	Honda	31	(United Kingdom) Scott Ogden	6-7
(Spain) Junior Team Estrella Galicia 0,0	Honda	6	(Japan) Ryusei Yamanaka	All
(Spain) Junior Team Estrella Galicia 0,0	Honda	76	(Spain) Julián Giral	All
(Spain) Junior Team Estrella Galicia 0,0	Honda	96	(Spain) Daniel Holgado	2-8
(Luxembourg) Leopard Impala Junior Team	Honda	23	(Italy) Davide Pizzoli	All
(Luxembourg) Leopard Impala Junior Team	Honda	24	(Spain) Xavier Artigas	All
(Luxembourg) Leopard Impala Junior Team	Honda	27	(Spain) Álex Díez	All
(Italy) SIC58 Squadra Corse	Honda	28	(Italy) Matteo Bertelle	All
(Italy) SIC58 Squadra Corse	Honda	65	(Japan) Hikaru Arita	All
(Italy) SIC58 Squadra Corse	Honda	88	(Italy) Matteo Patacca	All
(Malaysia) SIC Junior Team	Honda	36	(Malaysia) Izam Ikmal	All
(Malaysia) SIC Junior Team	Honda	39	(Malaysia) Syarifuddin Azman	8
(Malaysia) SIC Junior Team	Honda	78	(Malaysia) Idil Mahadi	1-7
(Italy) Team Leopard Junior Italia	Honda	5	(Italy) Matteo Ripamonti	4
(Italy) Team Leopard Junior Italia	Honda	66	(Australia) Joel Kelso	4
(Spain) Laglisse Academy	Husqvarna	19	(Spain) Víctor Rodríguez	1-2, 5
(Spain) Laglisse Academy	Husqvarna	25	(Spain) Adrián Fernández	All
(Spain) Laglisse Academy	Husqvarna	26	(Spain) Luis Miguel Verdugo	3-8
(Spain) Laglisse Academy	Husqvarna	52	(Spain) Jeremy Alcoba	All
(Spain) Ángel Nieto Junior Team	KTM	7	(Belgium) Barry Baltus	All
(Spain) Ángel Nieto Junior Team	KTM	73	(Austria) Maximilian Kofler	All
(Spain) Ángel Nieto Junior Team	KTM	77	(Italy) Raffaele Fusco	4, 6
(Spain) Ángel Nieto Junior Team	KTM	81	(Spain) Aleix Viu	All
(Spain) Baiko Racing Team	KTM	58	(Spain) Iñigo Iglesias	1, 4-8
(Spain) Baiko Racing Team	KTM	67	(Spain) Gerard Riu	All
(Italy) Team Ciatti – Speed Up	KTM	95	(Netherlands) Collin Veijer	8
(Spain) Cuna De Campeones	KTM	15	(Spain) Izan Guevara	8
(Spain) Cuna De Campeones	KTM	22	(Spain) Aarón Polanco	1-4
(Spain) Cuna De Campeones	KTM	38	(Spain) David Gómez	
(Spain) Cuna De Campeones	KTM	38	(Spain) David Salvador	All
(Spain) Cuna De Campeones	KTM	63	(Spain) Vicente Pérez	6-8
(Spain) FAU 55 Racing	KTM	20	(Spain) José Julián García	1-6
(Spain) FAU 55 Racing	KTM	47	(United Kingdom) Fenton Harrison Seabright	7-8
(Spain) FAU 55 Racing	KTM	87	(Spain) Faustino Cañero	1-2, 4
(Spain) FPW Racing	KTM	90	(United States) Brandon Paasch	1
(Spain) Fundación Andreas Pérez 77	KTM	37	(Spain) Pedro Acosta	6-8
(Spain) Fundación Andreas Pérez 77	KTM	82	(Italy) Stefano Nepa	1-4
(Spain) Fundación Andreas Pérez 77	KTM	83	(Brazil) Meikon Kawakami	1-7
(Spain) Fundación Andreas Pérez 77	KTM	89	(Spain) Marcos Uriarte	6-7
(Spain) Fundación Andreas Pérez 77	KTM	99	(Spain) Carlos Tatay	All
(Italy) Gazzola Racing	KTM	12	(Italy) Gian Paolo Di Vittori	5
(Spain) H43-Carxpert-Blumaq-KTM	KTM	50	(Switzerland) Jason Dupasquier	All
(Czech Republic) Igax Team	KTM	13	(Czech Republic) Filip Řeháček	1-5
(Czech Republic) Igax Team	KTM	54	(Czech Republic) Ondřej Vostatek	All
(Denmark) Team Jespersen	KTM	43	(Denmark) Simon Jespersen	4-8
(United Kingdom) KRP	KTM	70	(United Kingdom) Joshua Whatley	6-8
(Netherlands) Lagemaat Racing	KTM	18	(Netherlands) Ryan van de Lagemaat	1-6, 8
(Finland) Red Bull KTM Ajo	KTM	53	(Turkey) Deniz Öncü	All
(Italy) SN81 Junior Team	KTM	82	(Italy) Stefano Nepa	
(Italy) RGR TM Racing Factory Team	TM Racing	3	(Italy) Kevin Zannoni	1-5
(Italy) RGR TM Racing Factory Team	TM Racing	10	(Italy) Nicola Carraro	1, 3-8
(Italy) RGR TM Racing Factory Team	TM Racing	20	(Spain) José Julián García	7-8
(Italy) RGR TM Racing Factory Team	TM Racing	69	(Italy) Alessandro Morosi	8
Entry Lists:

== Championship standings ==
Scoring system

Points are awarded to the top fifteen finishers. A rider has to finish the race to earn points.

Position	1st	2nd	3rd	4th	5th	6th	7th	8th	9th	10th	11th	12th	13th	14th	15th
Points	25	20	16	13	11	10	9	8	7	6	5	4	3	2	1

=== Riders' championship ===
Pos.	Rider	Bike	EST (Portugal)	VAL (Spain)		FRA (France)	CAT (Spain)		ARA (Spain)	JER (Spain)		ALB (Spain)	VAL (Spain)		Points
1	(Spain) Jeremy Alcoba	Husqvarna	5	2	6	3	3	1	2	2	3	1	1	8	212
2	(Spain) Carlos Tatay	KTM	6	Ret	25	6	1	4	7	1	1	3	7	1	167
3	(Spain) Xavier Artigas	Honda	2	5	4	7	Ret	3	1	3	11	6	5	4	149
4	(Belgium) Barry Baltus	KTM	1	9	7	5	2	2	8	11	Ret	4	8	2	146
5	(Japan) Ryusei Yamanaka	Honda	14	6	1	32	26	5	6	5	2	5	4	7	122
6	(Spain) Daniel Holgado	Honda		4	3	4	5	Ret	12	6	Ret	2	13	5	101
7	(Japan) Yuki Kunii	Honda	18	1	2	1			4				6	9	100
8	(Spain) Jose Julián García	KTM	3	Ret	10	2	10	9	Ret	Ret	Ret				80
8	(Spain) Jose Julián García	TM Racing										11	2	Ret	80
9	(Spain) Adrián Fernández	Husqvarna	Ret	11	12	9	11	Ret	15	9	12	8	11	3	62
10	(Italy) Davide Pizzoli	Honda	Ret	3	8	Ret	12	Ret	3	15	10	12	12	Ret	59
11	(Spain) Gerard Riu	KTM	11	Ret	Ret	15	4	6	5	17	Ret	9	10	Ret	53
12	(Turkey) Deniz Öncü	KTM	28	Ret	Ret	8	Ret	8	11	13	4	7	Ret	Ret	46
13	(Spain) Aleix Viu	KTM	Ret	8	5	DNS	Ret	Ret	Ret	10	Ret	15	3	29	42
14	(Spain) David Salvador	KTM	Ret	13	14	16	6	Ret	14	7	7	10	29	Ret	41
15	(Japan) Haruki Noguchi	Honda		Ret	11	20	8	Ret	20	8	6	27	9	13	41
16	(Spain) Pedro Acosta	KTM								4	5	18	17	6	34
17	(Austria) Maximilian Kofler	KTM	12	Ret	Ret	11	7	10	13	19	15	Ret	19	10	34
18	(Indonesia) Mario Aji	Honda	4	16	18	Ret			10	Ret	9	Ret	16	26	26
19	(Italy) Stefano Nepa	KTM	22	7	9	21	Ret	7							25
20	(Brazil) Meikon Kawakami	KTM	7	20	19	19	9	12	Ret	21	13	21			23
21	(Switzerland) Jason Dupasquier	KTM	9	10	Ret	12	18	19	Ret	Ret	16	13	22	15	21
22	(Spain) Julián Giral	Honda	Ret	12	Ret	10	Ret	Ret	9	23	25	14	20	Ret	19
23	(Italy) Matteo Bertelle	Honda	8	14	13	14	15	18	17	26	23	25	27	14	18
24	(Italy) Kevin Zannoni	TM Racing	20			13	14	11	Ret	12	14				16
25	(United Kingdom) Max Cook	Honda	13	15	Ret	18	13	13	16	16	17	16	15	11	16
26	(Spain) Vicente Pérez	KTM								14	8	17	18	12	14
27	(Spain) Víctor Rodríguez	Husqvarna	10	18	15				22						7
28	(Japan) Hikaru Arita	Honda	27	26	16	22	16	14	18	22	20	29	34	23	2
29	(Malaysia) Izam Ikmal	Honda	17	Ret	22	25	DNS	Ret	Ret	28	18	20	14	Ret	2
30	(Spain) Iñigo Iglesias	KTM	DNS				21	15	21	Ret	19	DNS	DNQ	DNQ	1
31	(Netherlands) Ryan van de Lagemaat	KTM	15	21	20	Ret	Ret	26	29	Ret	Ret		33	Ret	1
	(Spain) Aarón Polanco	KTM	16	DNS	DNS	17	DNS	25	23						0
	(Italy) Matteo Patacca	Honda	19	19	21	23	20	16	19	20	21	22	35	20	0
	(Australia) Bill van Eerde	Honda		25	Ret	26	19	17	Ret	18	Ret	Ret	28	16	0
	(Czech Republic) Ondřej Vostatek	KTM	25	17	17	28	23	22	Ret	30	29	24	30	25	0
	(Italy) Nicola Carraro	TM Racing	21			Ret	17	Ret	DNS	Ret	26	26	26	17	0
	(Denmark) Simon Jespersen	KTM					Ret	23	24	25	24	19	21	18	0
	(United Kingdom) Joshua Whatley	KTM								29	28	Ret	31	19	0
	(Spain) Faustino Cañero	KTM	Ret	24	23		Ret	20							0
	(Spain) Luis Miguel Verdugo	Husqvarna				29	22	21	28	Ret	Ret	28	37	28	0
	(United Kingdom) Fenton Seabright	KTM										23	24	21	0
	(United Kingdom) Scott Ogden	Honda								24	22	Ret			0
	(Malaysia) Idil Mahadi	Honda	23	22	Ret	27	DNS	27	25	27	27	DNS			0
	(Spain) Izan Guevara	KTM											25	22	0
	(Spain) Álex Díez	Honda	24	23	24	24	24	24	27	31	30	30	DNQ	DNQ	0
	(Malaysia) Syarifuddin Azman	Honda											23	Ret	0
	(Italy) Alessandro Morosi	TM Racing											32	24	0
	(Australia) Joel Kelso	Honda					25	29							0
	(Czech Republic) Filip Řeháček	KTM	26	29	Ret	26	30	Ret	28						0
	(United Kingdom) Jamie Davies	KTM							26	DNQ	DNQ				0
	(Spain) Marcos Uriarte	KTM										31	36	27	0
	(United States) Brandon Paasch	KTM	Ret												0
	(Italy) Raffaele Fusco	KTM					DNQ	DNQ		DNS	DNS				0
	(Netherlands) Collin Veijer	KTM											DNQ	DNQ	0
	(Italy) Matteo Ripamonti	Honda					DNQ	DNQ							0
	(Italy) Gian Paolo Di Vittori	KTM							DNQ						0
Pos.	Rider	Bike	EST (Portugal)	VAL (Spain)		FRA (France)	CAT (Spain)		ARA (Spain)	JER (Spain)		ALB (Spain)	VAL (Spain)		Points

=== Constructors' championship ===
Pos.	Manufacturer	EST (Portugal)	VAL (Spain)		FRA (France)	CAT (Spain)		ARA (Spain)	JER (Spain)		ALB (Spain)	VAL (Spain)		Points
1	(Japan) Honda	2	1	1	1	5	3	1	3	2	2	4	4	229
2	(Austria) KTM	1	7	5	2	1	2	5	1	1	3	3	1	228
3	(Sweden) Husqvarna	5	2	6	3	3	1	2	2	3	1	1	3	220
4	(Italy) TM Racing	20			13	14	11	Ret	12	14	11	2	17	41
Pos.	Manufacturer	EST (Portugal)	VAL (Spain)		FRA (France)	CAT (Spain)		ARA (Spain)	JER (Spain)		ALB (Spain)	VAL (Spain)		Points
