= 2025 Moto3 World Championship =

14th running of the Moto3 World Championship

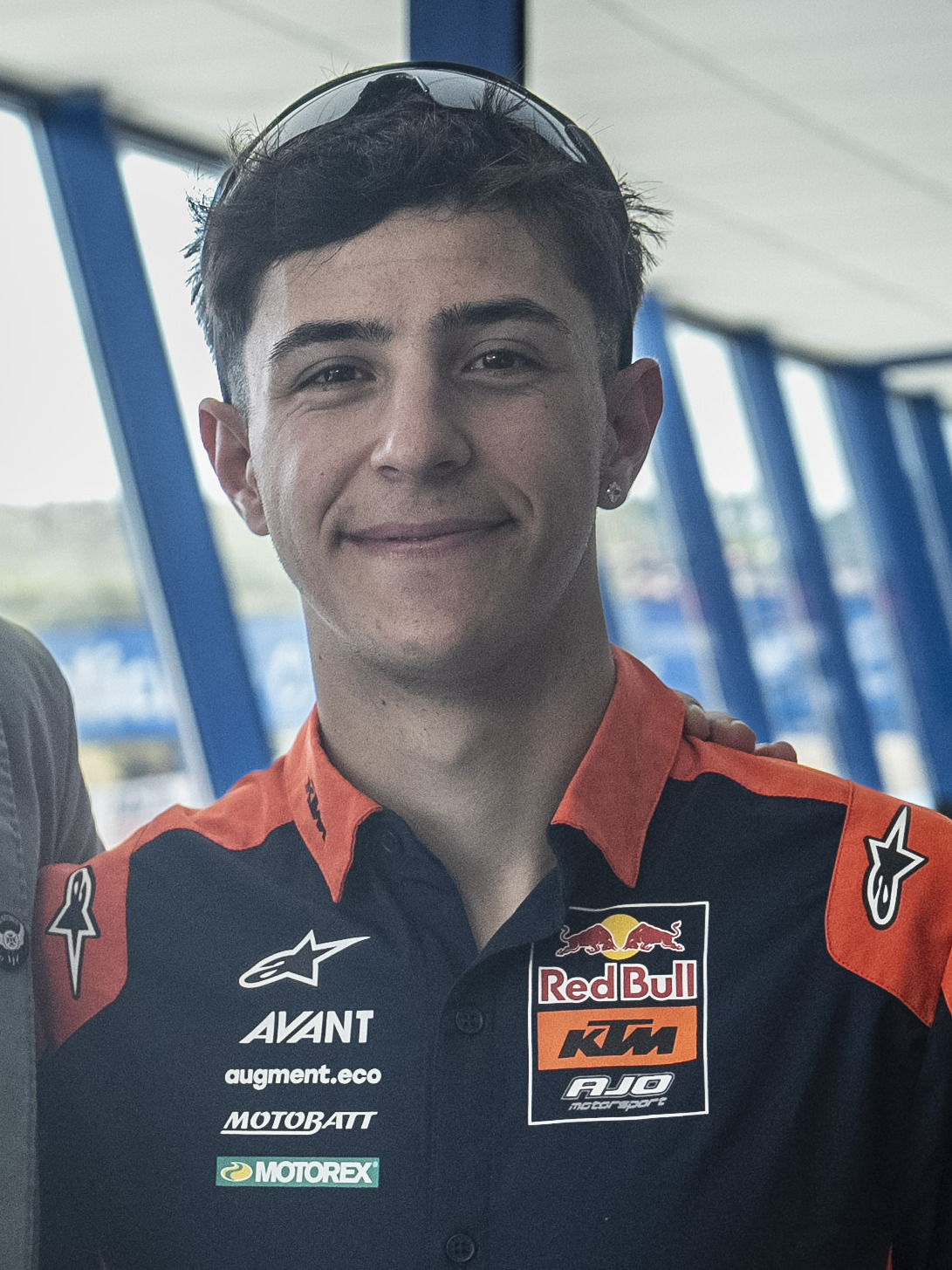
José Antonio Rueda was the 2025 Moto3 World Riders' Champion.

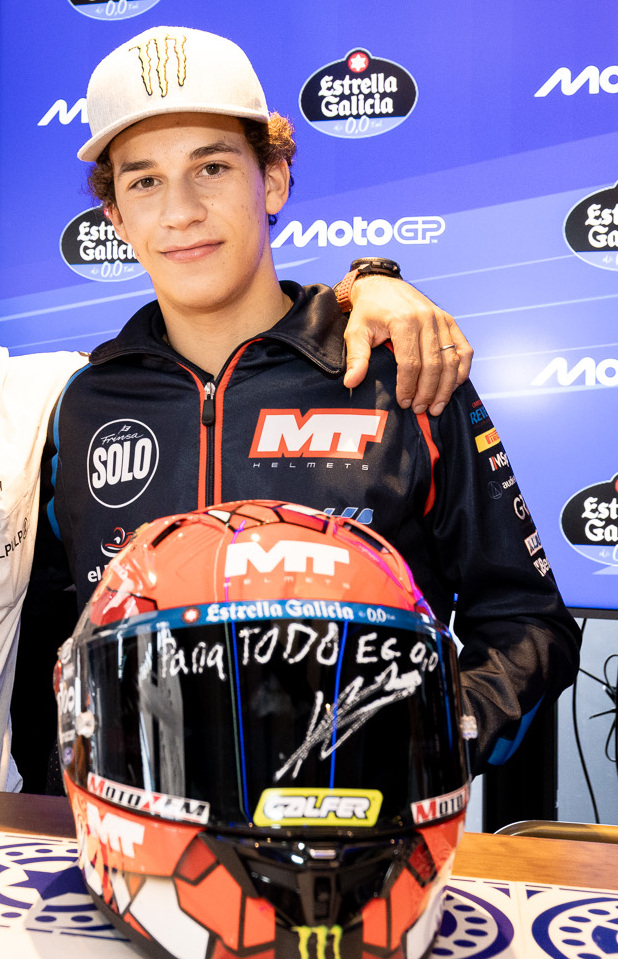
Ángel Piqueras finished runner-up.

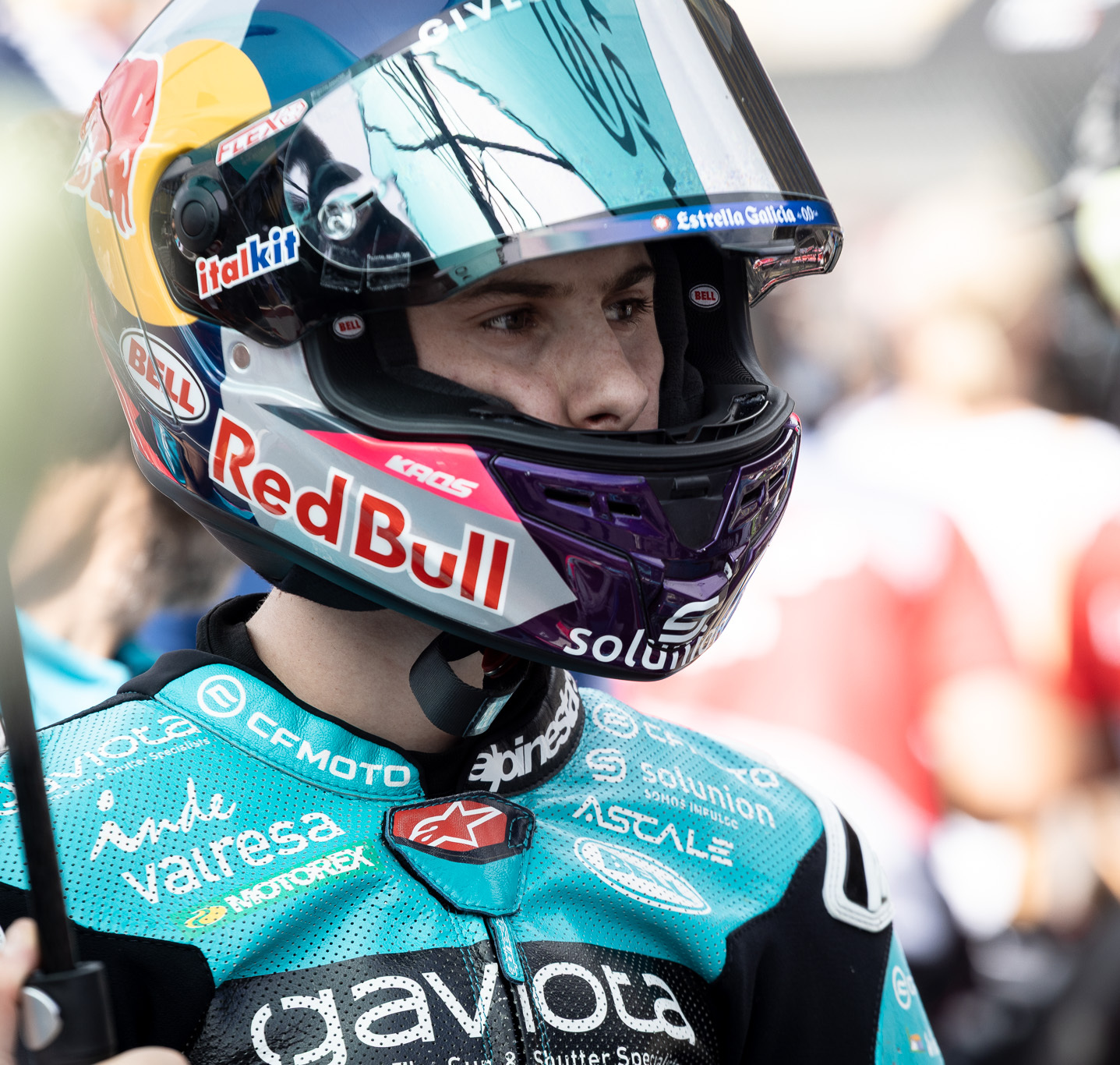
Máximo Quiles finished third and was the 2025 Moto3 Rookie of the Year.

The 2025 FIM Moto3 World Championship was the lightweight class of the 77th Fédération Internationale de Motocyclisme (FIM) Road Racing World Championship season. José Antonio Rueda won the championship title with four races to spare after winning the Grand Prix of Indonesia.

== Teams and riders ==
| Team | Constructor | Motorcycle | No. | Rider | Rounds |
|---|---|---|---|---|---|
| (United Kingdom) Gryd – MLav Racing (Note: Wildcard Marcos Ruda used the team name Angeluss – Mlav Racing during round 16.) | Honda | NSF250RW | 8 | (United Kingdom) Eddie O'Shea | All |
| (United Kingdom) Gryd – MLav Racing | Honda | NSF250RW | 89 | (Spain) Marcos Uriarte | 1–2, 8 |
| (United Kingdom) Gryd – MLav Racing | Honda | NSF250RW | 34 | (Austria) Jakob Rosenthaler | 3 |
| (United Kingdom) Gryd – MLav Racing | Honda | NSF250RW | 11 | (Spain) Adrián Cruces | 4–6 |
| (United Kingdom) Gryd – MLav Racing | Honda | NSF250RW | 30 | (United Kingdom) Max Cook | 7 |
| (United Kingdom) Gryd – MLav Racing | Honda | NSF250RW | 32 | (Spain) Vicente Pérez | 9, 11, 13 |
| (United Kingdom) Gryd – MLav Racing | Honda | NSF250RW | 25 | (Italy) Leonardo Abruzzo | 10, 12, 14 |
| (United Kingdom) Gryd – MLav Racing | Honda | NSF250RW | 95 | (Argentina) Marco Morelli | 15, 17–22 |
| (United Kingdom) Gryd – MLav Racing | Honda | NSF250RW | 52 | (United Kingdom) Evan Belford | 16 |
| (United Kingdom) Gryd – MLav Racing | Honda | NSF250RW | 69 | (Spain) Marcos Ruda | 16 |
| (Japan) Honda Team Asia | Honda | NSF250RW | 5 | (Thailand) Tatchakorn Buasri | 1–11, 19–20 |
| (Japan) Honda Team Asia | Honda | NSF250RW | 93 | (Indonesia) Arbi Aditama | 13–18 |
| (Japan) Honda Team Asia | Honda | NSF250RW | 2 | (Japan) Zen Mitani | 21–22 |
| (Japan) Honda Team Asia | Honda | NSF250RW | 72 | (Japan) Taiyo Furusato | All |
| (Luxembourg) Leopard Racing | Honda | NSF250RW | 22 | (Spain) David Almansa | All |
| (Luxembourg) Leopard Racing | Honda | NSF250RW | 31 | (Spain) Adrián Fernández | 1–6, 8–22 |
| (Luxembourg) Leopard Racing | Honda | NSF250RW | 78 | (Spain) Joel Esteban | 7 |
| (Italy) Rivacold Snipers Team | Honda | NSF250RW | 10 | (Italy) Nicola Carraro | 1–17, 19–22 |
| (Italy) Rivacold Snipers Team | Honda | NSF250RW | 2 | (Japan) Zen Mitani | 18 |
| (Italy) Rivacold Snipers Team | Honda | NSF250RW | 54 | (Italy) Riccardo Rossi | 1–20 |
| (Italy) Rivacold Snipers Team | Honda | NSF250RW | 45 | (Spain) Jesús Ríos | 21–22 |
| (Italy) Sic58 Squadra Corse | Honda | NSF250RW | 58 | (Italy) Luca Lunetta | 1–10, 15–22 |
| (Italy) Sic58 Squadra Corse | Honda | NSF250RW | 48 | (Switzerland) Lenoxx Phommara | 11–12 |
| (Italy) Sic58 Squadra Corse | Honda | NSF250RW | 67 | (Republic of Ireland) Casey O'Gorman | 13–14 |
| (Italy) Sic58 Squadra Corse | Honda | NSF250RW | 82 | (Italy) Stefano Nepa | All |
| (Spain) CFMoto Aspar Team (Note: This is the team name entered in the championship. Other team names used during the season are CFMoto Gaviota Aspar Team (rounds 1–2, 4–6, 10–19, 21), CFMoto Valresa Aspar Team (rounds 3, 7, 9, 22), CFMoto Viel Aspar Team (round 8), and CFMoto Power Electronics Aspar Team (round 20).) | KTM | RC250GP | 28 | (Spain) Máximo Quiles | 3, 6–22 |
| (Spain) CFMoto Aspar Team | KTM | RC250GP | 34 | (Austria) Jakob Rosenthaler | 1–2 |
| (Spain) CFMoto Aspar Team | KTM | RC250GP | 78 | (Spain) Joel Esteban | 4–5 |
| (Spain) CFMoto Aspar Team | KTM | RC250GP | 71 | (Italy) Dennis Foggia | 1–18, 21–22 |
| (Spain) CFMoto Aspar Team | KTM | RC250GP | 78 | (Spain) Joel Esteban | 19–20 |
| (France) CIP Green Power | KTM | RC250GP | 19 | (United Kingdom) Scott Ogden | All |
| (France) CIP Green Power | KTM | RC250GP | 55 | (Switzerland) Noah Dettwiler | 4–20 |
| (France) CIP Green Power | KTM | RC250GP | 11 | (Spain) Adrián Cruces | 1–3, 22 |
| (Spain) Denssi Racing – Boé | KTM | RC250GP | 14 | (New Zealand) Cormac Buchanan | All |
| (Spain) Denssi Racing – Boé | KTM | RC250GP | 21 | (South Africa) Ruché Moodley | 1–5, 7–9, 13–22 |
| (Spain) Denssi Racing – Boé | KTM | RC250GP | 34 | (Austria) Jakob Rosenthaler | 6, 10 |
| (Spain) Denssi Racing – Boé | KTM | RC250GP | 25 | (Italy) Leonardo Abruzzo | 11 |
| (Spain) Denssi Racing – Boé | KTM | RC250GP | 95 | (Argentina) Marco Morelli | 12 |
| (Spain) Frinsa – MT Helmets – MSi (Note: Wildcard Hakim Danish used the team name Aeon Credit SIC Racing MSi during round 20.) | KTM | RC250GP | 6 | (Japan) Ryusei Yamanaka | 1–20 |
| (Spain) Frinsa – MT Helmets – MSi | KTM | RC250GP | 13 | (Malaysia) Hakim Danish | 21–22 |
| (Spain) Frinsa – MT Helmets – MSi | KTM | RC250GP | 36 | (Spain) Ángel Piqueras | All |
| (Spain) Frinsa – MT Helmets – MSi | KTM | RC250GP | 13 | (Malaysia) Hakim Danish | 20 |
| (Italy) LevelUp – MTA | KTM | RC250GP | 18 | (Italy) Matteo Bertelle | 1–3, 17–22 |
| (Italy) LevelUp – MTA | KTM | RC250GP | 32 | (Spain) Vicente Pérez | 5–8 |
| (Italy) LevelUp – MTA | KTM | RC250GP | 89 | (Spain) Marcos Uriarte | 9–16 |
| (Italy) LevelUp – MTA | KTM | RC250GP | 66 | (Australia) Joel Kelso | All |
| (Germany) Liqui Moly Dynavolt Intact GP | KTM | RC250GP | 64 | (Spain) David Muñoz | 1–18 |
| (Germany) Liqui Moly Dynavolt Intact GP | KTM | RC250GP | 51 | (Spain) Brian Uriarte | 19–20 |
| (Germany) Liqui Moly Dynavolt Intact GP | KTM | RC250GP | 67 | (Republic of Ireland) Casey O'Gorman | 21–22 |
| (Germany) Liqui Moly Dynavolt Intact GP | KTM | RC250GP | 94 | (Italy) Guido Pini | All |
| (Finland) Red Bull KTM Ajo | KTM | RC250GP | 83 | (Spain) Álvaro Carpe | All |
| (Finland) Red Bull KTM Ajo | KTM | RC250GP | 99 | (Spain) José Antonio Rueda | 1–20 |
| (Finland) Red Bull KTM Ajo | KTM | RC250GP | 51 | (Spain) Brian Uriarte | 21–22 |
| (France) Red Bull KTM Tech3 | KTM | RC250GP | 12 | (Australia) Jacob Roulstone | 3–20, 22 |
| (France) Red Bull KTM Tech3 | KTM | RC250GP | 78 | (Spain) Joel Esteban | 1–2, 21 |
| (France) Red Bull KTM Tech3 | KTM | RC250GP | 73 | (Argentina) Valentín Perrone | All |

Key
Regular rider
Replacement rider
Wildcard rider

All teams used series-specified Pirelli tyres.

=== Team changes ===
- Intact GP, Tech3, and Aspar Team dropped their Husqvarna, GasGas, and CFMoto rebranded KTM bikes, respectively, for KTM-branded RC250GPs. Aspar Team retained CFMoto as a title sponsor.

=== Rider changes ===
- Álvaro Carpe, 2024 Red Bull MotoGP Rookies Cup and 2024 FIM JuniorGP World Champion champion, made his full-time Grand Prix debut with Red Bull KTM Ajo, replacing Xabi Zurutuza, who moved to the 2025 FIM Moto2 European Championship. Carpe had served as a wildcard rider at the 2024 finale.
- Ángel Piqueras moved to MT Helmets-MSi, replacing Iván Ortolá, who had been promoted to the Moto2 World Championship with the same team.
- David Almansa switched from the Snipers Team to Leopard Racing, replacing Ángel Piqueras.
- Team MTA fielded an all-new lineup with Matteo Bertelle, who moved over from the Snipers Team, and Joel Kelso, who moved over from BOE Motorsports.
- Riccardo Rossi took over the seat at the Snipers Team vacated by Matteo Bertelle, alongside former MTA rider Nicola Carraro.
- Filippo Farioli left the championship for the 2025 Supersport World Championship, with Stefano Nepa filling his spot in the Sic58 Squadra Corse, who had left Team MTA.
- David Muñoz moved over to Liqui Moly Dynavolt Intact GP after having raced with BOE Motorsports for the past three seasons.
- Eddie O'Shea and Marcos Uriarte completed the MLav Racing line-up. O'Shea had served as a full-time replacement rider in the second half of the 2024 season for the same team.
- Guido Pini made his Grand Prix debut in 2025, riding for Liqui Moly Dynavolt Intact GP, and replacing Tatsuki Suzuki, who had retired from racing at the end of the 2024 season.
- Dennis Foggia returned to the Moto3 Championship with the Aspar Team after spending the last two years in the Moto2 class. Rookie Máximo Quiles completed the line-up, having raced in the Red Bull Rookies Cup and FIM JuniorGP Championship in the past two seasons. David Alonso, 2024 Moto3 World Champion, stepped up to the Moto2 class with the same team, while former teammate Joel Esteban was demoted to the JuniorGP after not finding a seat in the championship for 2025.
- BOE Motorsports fielded an all-new lineup with Ruché Moodley and Cormac Buchanan making their Grand Prix debuts. Moodley had raced in the Red Bull Rookies Cup and JuniorGP in 2024, while Buchanan had raced in JuniorGP in 2024.
- Valentín Perrone made his Grand Prix debut in 2025 with Tech3 KTM Racing. Perrone had raced in the Red Bull Rookies Cup and European Talent Cup in 2024.
- Scott Ogden moved to CIP Green Power after racing with MLav Racing for the last three seasons.

==== Mid-season changes ====
- Jacob Roulstone missed the first two rounds of the season due to a neck injury sustained at a private training session. He was replaced by Joel Esteban.
- Marcos Uriarte missed a lot of races starting from the Austin GP to the British GP due to an injury sustained in a crash at the Argentina GP. He was replaced by Jakob Rosenthaler at the Austin GP, then by Adrián Cruces from the Qatar GP to the French GP and by Max Cook at the British GP. Uriarte returned for the Aragon GP and will be replaced by Vicente Pérez from the Italian round onwards. Pérez will be replaced at Leonardo Abruzzo in Assen, due to a crash in Mugello that sustained in a broken right scaphoid and a fractured vertebra. Pérez returned to the next round in Sachsenring but missed the following round in Brno, and once again, was replaced by Leonardo Abruzzo. The Spaniard made his return at the Red Bull Ring, in Austria.
- Máximo Quiles missed the first two rounds due to him being under the minimum age for riders who finish in the Top 3 of the 2024 FIM JuniorGP World Championship. He was replaced by Jakob Rosenthaler. Quiles would also then miss the Qatar and Jerez rounds after a medical check ahead of the former weekend revealed a thumb fracture, sustained during a pre-weekend training incident but initially overlooked. He was replaced by Joel Esteban.
- Noah Dettwiler missed the first three rounds due to a left wrist injury sustained in the pre-season tests in Jerez. He was replaced by Adrián Cruces.
- Matteo Bertelle will miss a number of rounds after being involved in an accident that resulted in a fracture of the right tibia and the left humerus. Vicente Pérez filled his seat from the Jerez round to the Aragon round and Marcos Uriarte will fill it from the Italian round onwards.
- Boé Motorsports rookie Ruché Moodley missed the French round due to a crash with David Muñoz that involved in a right radius fracture for the South African. He was replaced by Jakob Rosenthaler. Moodley returned for the next GP, at Silverstone, but after a crash involved with Pérez and Riccardo Rossi in Mugello that sustained in several fractures in his elbow and in his shoulder blade, he will miss the Dutch GP. Jakob Rosenthaler returned to replace him. Moodley also missed the next GPs in Germany and Czech Republic, and was replaced by Leonardo Abruzzo in Sachsenring and by Red Bull Rookies Cup Argentinian rider Marco Morelli at Brno. The South African made his return at the next round in the Red Bull Ring, in Austria.
- Adrián Fernández missed the British GP due to an injury to his leg from the previous round. He was replaced by Joel Esteban. Fernández returned to the Aragon GP.
- Vicente Pérez and Marcos Uriarte swapped bikes from the Italian round onwards. Uriarte moved from the Honda of the MLav Racing team to the KTM of the Team MTA, replacing the injured Matteo Bertelle and Pérez moved from the KTM of the Team MTA, to return to the Honda of the MLav Racing team. After the Austrian GP, Pérez and the MLav Racing Team decided to part ways, so the team decided to bring back Leonardo Abruzzo from the Hungarian round onwards to race alongside O'Shea.
- Luca Lunetta missed the German, Czech, Austrian, and Hungarian rounds due to severe leg injury, a multiple fracture of tibia and fibula, in a crash during the Dutch round. He was replaced by Lenoxx Phommara for the Sachsering and Brno rounds, and by Irish star Casey O'Gorman for the Red Bull Ring and Balaton Park rounds.
- Tatchakorn Buasri missed the Czech, Austrian, and Hungarian rounds due to a shoulder injury at the German round. Arbi Aditama replaced him at the latter two rounds. Buasri also missed the following rounds until the Indonesian round, with Aditama continuing as his replacement. Buasri returned at the Australian GP.
- Marco Morelli will race the remainder of the season with MLav Racing Team, starting at the Catalan round, taking the seat previously used by Vicente Pérez and Leonardo Abruzzo. With the exception of the Misano round, where he will participate in the Red Bull MotoGP Rookies Cup finale. Evan Belford will race in his place.
- Zen Mitani will make his Moto3 debut at the Indonesian GP, as a replacement for Nicola Carraro, due to a muscle issue for the Italian at the Japanese GP.
- Dennis Foggia will miss the Australian and Malaysian Grand Prix due to pneumonia before the Australian race weekend. He will be replaced in both races by Joel Esteban.
- David Muñoz will miss the final races of the season due to a crash sustained in the Indonesian GP that caused a severe injury on his left femur. Brian Uriarte will make his Moto3 debut, as his replacement, for the Australian and Malaysian Grand Prix. For the last two rounds of the season, Muñoz will have a new replacement in Casey O'Gorman, who made his debut in Austria and Hungary, as a replacement for Lunetta.
- Jacob Roulstone will miss the Portimao round due to an injury on his hand sustained on a crash during the practice in the previous round at Malaysia. He will be replaced once again, by Joel Esteban.
- Hakim Danish will replace Ryusei Yamanaka for the last two rounds, as Yamanaka will miss these two races due to surgery on the left pinky finger for the Japanese rider.
- Brian Uriarte will make team switch from the Intact GP to KTM Ajo as a replacement for the reigning World Champion José Antonio Rueda due to a hand injury sustained on the sighting lap of the Malaysian GP, in a crash with Noah Dettwiler. Rueda will miss the last two rounds of the season. Dettwiler will also miss the Portimao round and will not be replaced.
- Joel Esteban will make another replacement once again for the injured Jacob Roulstone for the Portimao round, due to a fractured hand in the Malaysian GP. Esteban raced for Tech3 in the first two rounds of the season. He will be back in that bike after replacing Foggia in the two previous rounds.
- Zen Mitani will replace Tatchakorn Buasri for the final two rounds of the season at Portimao and Valencia.
- Riccardo Rossi will miss the final two rounds of the season due to surgery on his left knee. He will be replaced by Jesús Ríos.
- Adrián Cruces made his comeback for the season finale at Valencia, as a replacement for the injured Noah Dettwiler.

== Rule changes ==
=== Mid-season rule changes ===
- From the start of Malaysian Grand Prix, riders wouldn't be allowed to rejoin qualifying sessions if they fall during the final three minutes. The same will apply to the Friday afternoon Practice session. In another small adjustment to the rules, riders have been instructed not warm up their tyres by means of zig-zagging in the pitlane.

== Calendar ==
The following Grands Prix took place in 2025:

| Round | Date | Grand Prix | Circuit | Ref. |
|---|---|---|---|---|
| 1 | 2 March | PT Grand Prix of Thailand | Buriram International Circuit, Buriram | |
| 2 | 16 March | Gran Premio YPF Energía de Argentina | Autódromo Termas de Río Hondo, Termas de Río Hondo | |
| 3 | 30 March | (United States) Red Bull Grand Prix of the Americas | Circuit of the Americas, Austin | |
| 4 | 13 April | Qatar Airways Grand Prix of Qatar | Lusail International Circuit, Lusail | |
| 5 | 27 April | Estrella Galicia 0,0 Grand Prix of Spain | Circuito de Jerez, Jerez de la Frontera | |
| 6 | 11 May | Michelin Grand Prix of France | Bugatti Circuit, Le Mans | |
| 7 | 25 May | Tissot Grand Prix of the United Kingdom | Silverstone Circuit, Silverstone | |
| 8 | 8 June | GoPro Grand Prix of Aragon | MotorLand Aragón, Alcañiz | |
| 9 | 22 June | Brembo Grand Prix of Italy | Mugello Circuit, Scarperia e San Piero | |
| 10 | 29 June | Motul Grand Prix of the Netherlands | TT Circuit Assen, Assen | |
| 11 | 13 July | Liqui Moly Grand Prix of Germany | Sachsenring, Hohenstein-Ernstthal | |
| 12 | 20 July | (Czech Republic) Tissot Grand Prix of Czechia | Brno Circuit, Brno | |
| 13 | 17 August | bwin Grand Prix of Austria | Red Bull Ring, Spielberg | |
| 14 | 24 August | Michelin Grand Prix of Hungary | Balaton Park Circuit, Balatonfőkajár | |
| 15 | 7 September | Monster Energy Grand Prix of Catalonia | Circuit de Barcelona-Catalunya, Montmeló | |
| 16 | 14 September | Red Bull Grand Prix of San Marino and the Rimini Riviera | Misano World Circuit, Misano Adriatico | |
| 17 | 28 September | Motul Grand Prix of Japan | Motegi Circuit, Motegi | |
| 18 | 5 October | Pertamina Grand Prix of Indonesia | Mandalika International Street Circuit, Mandalika | |
| 19 | 19 October | (Australia) Liqui Moly Australian Motorcycle Grand Prix | Phillip Island Grand Prix Circuit, Phillip Island | |
| 20 | 26 October | Petronas Grand Prix of Malaysia | Sepang International Circuit, Sepang | |
| 21 | 9 November | Qatar Airways Grand Prix of Portugal | Algarve International Circuit, Portimão | |
| 22 | 16 November | Motul Grand Prix of the Valencian Community | Circuit Ricardo Tormo, Valencia | |

The following Grand Prix acted as a reserve for 2025:

| Grand Prix | Circuit | Ref. |
|---|---|---|
| (India) Indian motorcycle Grand Prix | Buddh International Circuit, Greater Noida | |

=== Grand Prix locations ===
Location of non-European Grands Prix in 2025.
Location of European Grands Prix in 2025.

== Results and standings ==
=== Grands Prix ===
| Round | Grand Prix | Pole position | Fastest lap | Winning rider | Winning team | Winning constructor | Report |
|---|---|---|---|---|---|---|---|
| 1 | Thailand motorcycle Grand Prix | (Italy) Matteo Bertelle | (Spain) David Muñoz | (Spain) José Antonio Rueda | (Finland) Red Bull KTM Ajo | (Austria) KTM | Report |
| 2 | (Argentina) Argentine motorcycle Grand Prix | (Italy) Matteo Bertelle | (Spain) Ángel Piqueras | (Spain) Ángel Piqueras | (Spain) Frinsa – MT Helmets – MSi | (Austria) KTM | Report |
| 3 | (United States) Motorcycle Grand Prix of the Americas | (Spain) David Muñoz | (Italy) Matteo Bertelle | (Spain) José Antonio Rueda | (Finland) Red Bull KTM Ajo | (Austria) KTM | Report |
| 4 | Qatar motorcycle Grand Prix | (Japan) Ryusei Yamanaka | (Spain) David Muñoz | (Spain) Ángel Piqueras | (Spain) Frinsa – MT Helmets – MSi | (Austria) KTM | Report |
| 5 | (Spain) Spanish motorcycle Grand Prix | (Spain) José Antonio Rueda | (Spain) José Antonio Rueda | (Spain) José Antonio Rueda | (Finland) Red Bull KTM Ajo | (Austria) KTM | Report |
| 6 | (France) French motorcycle Grand Prix | (Spain) Máximo Quiles | (Spain) Álvaro Carpe | (Spain) José Antonio Rueda | (Finland) Red Bull KTM Ajo | (Austria) KTM | Report |
| 7 | (United Kingdom) British motorcycle Grand Prix | (Spain) José Antonio Rueda (Note: Rueda was given a back of the grid penalty for riding slowly on the racing line, but retains the pole position statistic despite starting the race from 26th position. Álvaro Carpe started the race from the first grid slot.) | (Japan) Taiyo Furusato | (Spain) José Antonio Rueda | (Finland) Red Bull KTM Ajo | (Austria) KTM | Report |
| 8 | Aragon motorcycle Grand Prix | (Spain) José Antonio Rueda | (Italy) Luca Lunetta | (Spain) David Muñoz | (Germany) Liqui Moly Dynavolt Intact GP | (Austria) KTM | Report |
| 9 | (Italy) Italian motorcycle Grand Prix | (Spain) Álvaro Carpe | (Spain) David Muñoz | (Spain) Máximo Quiles | (Spain) CFMoto Valresa Aspar Team | (Austria) KTM | Report |
| 10 | (Netherlands) Dutch TT | (Spain) José Antonio Rueda | (Australia) Joel Kelso | (Spain) José Antonio Rueda | (Finland) Red Bull KTM Ajo | (Austria) KTM | Report |
| 11 | (Germany) German motorcycle Grand Prix | (United Kingdom) Scott Ogden | (Spain) Ángel Piqueras | (Spain) David Muñoz | (Germany) Liqui Moly Dynavolt Intact GP | (Austria) KTM | Report |
| 12 | (Czech Republic) Czech motorcycle Grand Prix | (Italy) Guido Pini | (Spain) José Antonio Rueda | (Spain) José Antonio Rueda | (Finland) Red Bull KTM Ajo | (Austria) KTM | Report |
| 13 | (Austria) Austrian motorcycle Grand Prix | (Argentina) Valentín Perrone | (Japan) Taiyo Furusato | (Spain) Ángel Piqueras | (Spain) Frinsa – MT Helmets – MSi | (Austria) KTM | Report |
| 14 | (Hungary) Hungarian motorcycle Grand Prix | (Spain) Máximo Quiles | (Spain) David Muñoz | (Spain) Máximo Quiles | (Spain) CFMoto Gaviota Aspar Team | (Austria) KTM | Report |
| 15 | (Catalonia) Catalan motorcycle Grand Prix | (Spain) David Almansa | (Japan) Taiyo Furusato | (Spain) Ángel Piqueras | (Spain) Frinsa – MT Helmets – MSi | (Austria) KTM | Report |
| 16 | San Marino and Rimini Riviera motorcycle Grand Prix | (Argentina) Valentín Perrone | (Argentina) Valentín Perrone | (Spain) José Antonio Rueda | (Finland) Red Bull KTM Ajo | (Austria) KTM | Report |
| 17 | (Japan) Japanese motorcycle Grand Prix | (Spain) José Antonio Rueda | (Spain) José Antonio Rueda | (Spain) David Muñoz | (Germany) Liqui Moly Dynavolt Intact GP | (Austria) KTM | Report |
| 18 | (Indonesia) Indonesian motorcycle Grand Prix | (Spain) Adrián Fernández | (Spain) José Antonio Rueda | (Spain) José Antonio Rueda | (Finland) Red Bull KTM Ajo | (Austria) KTM | Report |
| 19 | (Australia) Australian motorcycle Grand Prix | (Australia) Joel Kelso | (Spain) Álvaro Carpe | (Spain) José Antonio Rueda | (Finland) Red Bull KTM Ajo | (Austria) KTM | Report |
| 20 | (Malaysia) Malaysian motorcycle Grand Prix | (Spain) David Almansa | (Malaysia) Hakim Danish | (Japan) Taiyo Furusato | (Japan) Honda Team Asia | (Japan) Honda | Report |
| 21 | (Portugal) Portuguese motorcycle Grand Prix | (Australia) Joel Kelso | (Spain) Ángel Piqueras | (Spain) Máximo Quiles | (Spain) CFMoto Gaviota Aspar Team | (Austria) KTM | Report |
| 22 | Valencian Community motorcycle Grand Prix | (Spain) Adrián Fernández | (Spain) Álvaro Carpe | (Spain) Adrián Fernández | (Luxembourg) Leopard Racing | (Japan) Honda | Report |

=== Riders' standings ===
Scoring system

Points were awarded to the top fifteen finishers. A rider had to finish the race to earn points.

| Position | 1st | 2nd | 3rd | 4th | 5th | 6th | 7th | 8th | 9th | 10th | 11th | 12th | 13th | 14th | 15th |
| Points | 25 | 20 | 16 | 13 | 11 | 10 | 9 | 8 | 7 | 6 | 5 | 4 | 3 | 2 | 1 |

| Pos. | Rider | Bike | Team | THA (Thailand) | ARG (Argentina) | AME (United States) | QAT (Qatar) | SPA (Spain) | FRA (France) | GBR (United Kingdom) | ARA (Aragon) | ITA (Italy) | NED (Netherlands) | GER (Germany) | CZE (Czech Republic) | AUT (Austria) | HUN (Hungary) | CAT (Catalonia) | RSM (San Marino) | JPN (Japan) | INA (Indonesia) | AUS (Australia) | MAL (Malaysia) | POR (Portugal) | VAL (Valencian Community) | Pts |
|---|---|---|---|---|---|---|---|---|---|---|---|---|---|---|---|---|---|---|---|---|---|---|---|---|---|---|
| 1 | (Spain) José Antonio Rueda | KTM | Red Bull KTM Ajo | 1 | 3 | 1 | Ret | 1^{P F} | 1 | 1^{P} | 8^{P} | 4 | 1^{P} | 3 | 1^{F} | 5 | 5 | 2 | 1 | 2^{P F} | 1^{F} | 1 | DNS | | | 365 |
| 2 | (Spain) Ángel Piqueras | KTM | Frinsa – MT Helmets – MSi | 12 | 1^{F} | 4 | 1 | 2 | Ret | Ret | 6 | 7 | 5 | 4^{F} | 4 | 1 | 4 | 1 | 5 | 11 | 7 | 17 | 2 | 2^{F} | 6 | 281 |
| 3 | (Spain) Máximo Quiles | KTM | CFMoto Aspar Team | | | 5 | | | 7^{P} | 2 | 2 | 1 | 15 | 2 | 2 | 4 | 1^{P} | 12 | 2 | 3 | 4 | 5 | 6 | 1 | 5 | 274 |
| 4 | (Spain) Álvaro Carpe | KTM | Red Bull KTM Ajo | 2 | NC | 6 | 11 | 8 | 4^{F} | 4 | 3 | 2^{P} | 4 | 5 | 12 | 10 | 9 | 13 | 10 | 14 | Ret | 3^{F} | 5 | 5 | 2^{F} | 215 |
| 5 | (Spain) David Muñoz | KTM | Liqui Moly Dynavolt Intact GP | Ret^{F} | Ret | Ret^{P} | 6^{F} | Ret | 3 | Ret | 1 | 5^{F} | 2 | 1 | 3 | 3 | 3^{F} | 8 | 7 | 1 | Ret | | | | | 197 |
| 6 | (Australia) Joel Kelso | KTM | LevelUp – MTA | Ret | 8 | 2 | 4 | 3 | 2 | Ret | 7 | 9 | 9^{F} | 6 | DNS | 11 | 8 | 7 | 4 | 8 | 10 | 2^{P} | 11 | 7^{P} | 23 | 193 |
| 7 | (Spain) Adrián Fernández | Honda | Leopard Racing | 3 | 2 | 12 | Ret | 4 | 8 | | DNS | Ret | Ret | Ret | 6 | 8 | 6 | 5 | 3 | 5 | 6^{P} | 6 | DSQ | 9 | 1^{P} | 179 |
| 8 | (Japan) Taiyo Furusato | Honda | Honda Team Asia | Ret | 5 | 9 | 2 | 6 | 6 | 12^{F} | 11 | 6 | Ret | Ret | 16 | 6^{F} | Ret | 3^{F} | 12 | Ret | Ret | 8 | 1 | 3 | 3 | 172 |
| 9 | (Japan) Ryusei Yamanaka | KTM | Frinsa – MT Helmets – MSi | Ret | 9 | 19 | 3^{P} | 5 | Ret | 8 | 9 | 10 | 11 | 15 | 9 | 2 | 14 | 9 | 8 | 6 | 8 | 22 | 4 | | | 136 |
| 10 | (Argentina) Valentín Perrone | KTM | Red Bull KTM Tech3 | Ret | Ret | Ret | 15 | 10 | 10 | 5 | 13 | 8 | 3 | 12 | 8 | 7^{P} | 2 | 10 | 6^{P F} | 4 | DNS | 20 | 9 | Ret | 10 | 134 |
| 11 | (Spain) David Almansa | Honda | Leopard Racing | 7 | 6 | 13 | 16 | Ret | 5 | 6 | 4 | Ret | 6 | Ret | 7 | 12 | 7 | 4^{P} | 14 | Ret | Ret | 9 | 3^{P} | 21 | 8 | 134 |
| 12 | (Italy) Luca Lunetta | Honda | Sic58 Squadra Corse | 10 | 7 | Ret | 7 | 11 | 9 | 3 | 5^{F} | Ret | Ret | | | | | 11 | Ret | 9 | 2 | 7 | 10 | 10 | 7 | 125 |
| 13 | (Italy) Guido Pini | KTM | Liqui Moly Dynavolt Intact GP | Ret | Ret | 11 | 10 | 7 | 17 | 7 | 19 | Ret | DNS | 7 | 10^{P} | 9 | Ret | 6 | 9 | 7 | 3 | 12 | 15 | Ret | 4 | 111 |
| 14 | (Italy) Dennis Foggia | KTM | CFMoto Aspar Team | 6 | 11 | 7 | Ret | 13 | 11 | Ret | 15 | 3 | 8 | 11 | 5 | 13 | 11 | 19 | 13 | 10 | 12 | | | 14 | 21 | 96 |
| 15 | (United Kingdom) Scott Ogden | KTM | CIP Green Power | Ret | 12 | Ret | 12 | 12 | 12 | 11 | 12 | 12 | 7 | Ret^{P} | 15 | 15 | Ret | 14 | 15 | 21 | Ret | 14 | 7 | 8 | Ret | 62 |
| 16 | (Australia) Jacob Roulstone | KTM | Red Bull KTM Tech3 | | | 14 | 14 | 9 | 13 | 13 | Ret | 13 | 12 | 8 | 14 | 14 | 10 | Ret | 11 | 13 | 5 | Ret | DNS | | 16 | 61 |
| 17 | (Italy) Matteo Bertelle | KTM | LevelUp – MTA | 5^{P} | 4^{P} | 3^{F} | | | | | | | | | | | | | | 12 | 11 | 10 | 19 | Ret | 19 | 55 |
| 18 | (Italy) Stefano Nepa | Honda | Sic58 Squadra Corse | 4 | 10 | Ret | 8 | 14 | Ret | 16 | NC | 14 | 13 | 13 | 17 | 24 | 17 | 23 | 18 | 15 | 9 | 15 | 21 | 18 | 11 | 51 |
| 19 | (Spain) Joel Esteban | KTM | Red Bull KTM Tech3 | 9 | 16 | | | | | | | | | | | | | | | | | | | 4 | | 33 |
| 19 | (Spain) Joel Esteban | KTM | CFMoto Aspar Team | | | | Ret | Ret | | | | | | | | | | | | | | 4 | 16 | | | 33 |
| 19 | (Spain) Joel Esteban | Honda | Leopard Racing | | | | | | | NC | | | | | | | | | | | | | | | | 33 |
| 20 | (New Zealand) Cormac Buchanan | KTM | Denssi Racing – Boé | 15 | 14 | 10 | Ret | 19 | 14 | 14 | 10 | 15 | Ret | 9 | DNS | Ret | Ret | Ret | 17 | 16 | 16 | 11 | Ret | 20 | 24 | 32 |
| 21 | (Italy) Nicola Carraro | Honda | Rivacold Snipers Team | Ret | 19 | 15 | 9 | Ret | 15 | 10 | 17 | 11 | Ret | 18 | Ret | 19 | 12 | 20 | 22 | DNS | | 13 | 13 | 15 | 18 | 31 |
| 22 | (Italy) Riccardo Rossi | Honda | Rivacold Snipers Team | 8 | 18 | Ret | 5 | Ret | 18 | 15 | 18 | Ret | 14 | 14 | Ret | 20 | 19 | 16 | 20 | 20 | 18 | 25 | 17 | | | 24 |
| 23 | (Spain) Marcos Uriarte | Honda | Gryd – MLav Racing | 13 | Ret | | | | | | 23 | | | | | | | | | | | | | | | 22 |
| 23 | (Spain) Marcos Uriarte | KTM | LevelUp – MTA | | | | | | | | | 16 | 10 | 10 | 11 | 16 | 15 | 15 | 21 | | | | | | | 22 |
| 24 | (Argentina) Marco Morelli | KTM | Denssi Racing – Boé | | | | | | | | | | | | 13 | | | | | | | | | | | 18 |
| 24 | (Argentina) Marco Morelli | Honda | Gryd – MLav Racing | | | | | | | | | | | | | | | 17 | | 17 | 14 | 18 | 12 | 11 | 12 | 18 |
| 25 | (Republic of Ireland) Casey O'Gorman | Honda | Sic58 Squadra Corse | | | | | | | | | | | | | 18 | 13 | | | | | | | | | 16 |
| 25 | (Republic of Ireland) Casey O'Gorman | KTM | Liqui Moly Dynavolt Intact GP | | | | | | | | | | | | | | | | | | | | | 6 | 13 | 16 |
| 26 | (Spain) Adrián Cruces | KTM | CIP Green Power | 14 | 13 | 8 | | | | | | | | | | | | | | | | | | | 15 | 14 |
| 26 | (Spain) Adrián Cruces | Honda | Gryd – MLav Racing | | | | DNS | 17 | Ret | | | | | | | | | | | | | | | | | 14 |
| 27 | (South Africa) Ruché Moodley | KTM | Denssi Racing – Boé | 11 | 15 | 16 | 13 | Ret | | 20 | 14 | Ret | | | | 17 | 16 | 18 | 16 | 19 | 13 | 21 | 18 | 17 | 22 | 14 |
| 28 | (Spain) Brian Uriarte | KTM | Liqui Moly Dynavolt Intact GP | | | | | | | | | | | | | | | | | | | 19 | 8 | | | 11 |
| 28 | (Spain) Brian Uriarte | KTM | Red Bull KTM Ajo | | | | | | | | | | | | | | | | | | | | | 13 | 17 | 11 |
| 29 | (Spain) Vicente Pérez | KTM | LevelUp – MTA | | | | | 18 | 16 | 9 | 22 | | | | | | | | | | | | | | | 7 |
| 29 | (Spain) Vicente Pérez | Honda | Gryd – MLav Racing | | | | | | | | | Ret | | DNS | | Ret | | | | | | | | | | 7 |
| 30 | (Spain) Jesús Ríos | Honda | Rivacold Snipers Team | | | | | | | | | | | | | | | | | | | | | Ret | 9 | 7 |
| 31 | (Malaysia) Hakim Danish | KTM | Aeon Credit SIC Racing MSi | | | | | | | | | | | | | | | | | | | | Ret^{F} | | | 6 |
| 31 | (Malaysia) Hakim Danish | KTM | Frinsa – MT Helmets – MSi | | | | | | | | | | | | | | | | | | | | | 12 | 14 | 6 |
| 32 | (United Kingdom) Eddie O'Shea | Honda | Gryd – MLav Racing | Ret | 17 | 17 | 18 | Ret | Ret | 17 | 21 | 18 | Ret | Ret | 18 | 21 | Ret | 22 | Ret | 18 | 15 | 16 | 14 | 16 | 20 | 3 |
| 33 | (Thailand) Tatchakorn Buasri | Honda | Honda Team Asia | Ret | 21 | DNS | 19 | 15 | 19 | 19 | 20 | 17 | Ret | Ret | | | | | | | | 24 | 20 | | | 1 |
| 34 | (Switzerland) Noah Dettwiler | KTM | CIP Green Power | | | | 17 | 16 | 20 | 18 | 16 | 19 | 16 | 16 | 19 | 23 | 18 | 21 | 19 | Ret | 17 | 23 | DNS | | | 0 |
| 35 | (Austria) Jakob Rosenthaler | KTM | CFMoto Aspar Team | Ret | 20 | | | | | | | | | | | | | | | | | | | | | 0 |
| 35 | (Austria) Jakob Rosenthaler | Honda | Gryd – MLav Racing | | | 18 | | | | | | | | | | | | | | | | | | | | 0 |
| 35 | (Austria) Jakob Rosenthaler | KTM | Denssi Racing – Boé | | | | | | 21 | | | | 17 | | | | | | | | | | | | | 0 |
| 36 | (Switzerland) Lenoxx Phommara | Honda | Sic58 Squadra Corse | | | | | | | | | | | 17 | Ret | | | | | | | | | | | 0 |
| 37 | (Indonesia) Arbi Aditama | Honda | Honda Team Asia | | | | | | | | | | | | | 22 | 20 | 24 | Ret | Ret | 19 | | | | | 0 |
| 38 | (Japan) Zen Mitani | Honda | Rivacold Snipers Team | | | | | | | | | | | | | | | | | | Ret | | | | | 0 |
| 38 | (Japan) Zen Mitani | Honda | Honda Team Asia | | | | | | | | | | | | | | | | | | | | | 19 | Ret | 0 |
| 39 | (Italy) Leonardo Abruzzo | Honda | Gryd – MLav Racing | | | | | | | | | | Ret | | 20 | | 21 | | | | | | | | | 0 |
| 39 | (Italy) Leonardo Abruzzo | KTM | Denssi Racing – Boé | | | | | | | | | | | Ret | | | | | | | | | | | | 0 |
| 40 | (United Kingdom) Max Cook | Honda | Gryd – MLav Racing | | | | | | | 21 | | | | | | | | | | | | | | | | 0 |
| | (United Kingdom) Evan Belford | Honda | Gryd – MLav Racing | | | | | | | | | | | | | | | | Ret | | | | | | | 0 |
| | (Spain) Marcos Ruda | Honda | Angeluss – Mlav Racing | | | | | | | | | | | | | | | | Ret | | | | | | | 0 |
| Pos. | Rider | Bike | Team | THA (Thailand) | ARG (Argentina) | AME (United States) | QAT (Qatar) | SPA (Spain) | FRA (France) | GBR (United Kingdom) | ARA (Aragon) | ITA (Italy) | NED (Netherlands) | GER (Germany) | CZE (Czech Republic) | AUT (Austria) | HUN (Hungary) | CAT (Catalonia) | RSM (San Marino) | JPN (Japan) | INA (Indonesia) | AUS (Australia) | MAL (Malaysia) | POR (Portugal) | VAL (Valencian Community) | Pts |

Race key
| Colour | Result |
|---|---|
| Gold | Winner |
| Silver | 2nd place |
| Bronze | 3rd place |
| Green | Points finish |
| Blue | Non-points finish |
| Blue | Non-classified finish (NC) |
| Purple | Retired (Ret) |
| Red | Did not qualify (DNQ) |
| Black | Disqualified (DSQ) |
| White | Did not start (DNS) |
| White | Withdrew (WD) |
| White | Race cancelled (C) |
| Blank | Did not practice (DNP) |
| Blank | Excluded (EX) |
| Blank | Did not arrive (DNA) |
| Blank | Did not enter (empty cell) |
| Annotation | Meaning |
| P | Pole position |
| F | Fastest lap |
Rider key
| Colour | Meaning |
| Light blue | Rookie rider |

=== Constructors' standings ===
Each constructor was awarded the same number of points as their best placed rider in each race.

| Pos. | Constructor | THA (Thailand) | ARG (Argentina) | AME (United States) | QAT (Qatar) | SPA (Spain) | FRA (France) | GBR (United Kingdom) | ARA (Aragon) | ITA (Italy) | NED (Netherlands) | GER (Germany) | CZE (Czech Republic) | AUT (Austria) | HUN (Hungary) | CAT (Catalonia) | RSM (San Marino) | JPN (Japan) | INA (Indonesia) | AUS (Australia) | MAL (Malaysia) | POR (Portugal) | VAL (Valencian Community) | Pts |
|---|---|---|---|---|---|---|---|---|---|---|---|---|---|---|---|---|---|---|---|---|---|---|---|---|
| 1 | (Austria) KTM | 1 | 1 | 1 | 1 | 1 | 1 | 1 | 1 | 1 | 1 | 1 | 1 | 1 | 1 | 1 | 1 | 1 | 1 | 1 | 2 | 1 | 2 | 540 |
| 2 | (Japan) Honda | 3 | 2 | 9 | 2 | 4 | 5 | 3 | 4 | 6 | 6 | 13 | 6 | 6 | 6 | 3 | 3 | 5 | 2 | 6 | 1 | 3 | 1 | 308 |
| Pos. | Constructor | THA (Thailand) | ARG (Argentina) | AME (United States) | QAT (Qatar) | SPA (Spain) | FRA (France) | GBR (United Kingdom) | ARA (Aragon) | ITA (Italy) | NED (Netherlands) | GER (Germany) | CZE (Czech Republic) | AUT (Austria) | HUN (Hungary) | CAT (Catalonia) | RSM (San Marino) | JPN (Japan) | INA (Indonesia) | AUS (Australia) | MAL (Malaysia) | POR (Portugal) | VAL (Valencian Community) | Pts |

=== Teams' standings ===
The teams' standings were based on results obtained by regular and substitute riders; wild-card entries were ineligible.

| Pos. | Team | Bike No. | THA (Thailand) | ARG (Argentina) | AME (United States) | QAT (Qatar) | SPA (Spain) | FRA (France) | GBR (United Kingdom) | ARA (Aragon) | ITA (Italy) | NED (Netherlands) | GER (Germany) | CZE (Czech Republic) | AUT (Austria) | HUN (Hungary) | CAT (Catalonia) | RSM (San Marino) | JPN (Japan) | INA (Indonesia) | AUS (Australia) | MAL (Malaysia) | POR (Portugal) | VAL (Valencian Community) | Pts |
|---|---|---|---|---|---|---|---|---|---|---|---|---|---|---|---|---|---|---|---|---|---|---|---|---|---|
| 1 | (Finland) Red Bull KTM Ajo | 51 | | | | | | | | | | | | | | | | | | | | | 13 | 17 | 583 |
| 1 | (Finland) Red Bull KTM Ajo | 83 | 2 | NC | 6 | 11 | 8 | 4^{F} | 4 | 3 | 2^{P} | 4 | 5 | 12 | 11 | 9 | 13 | 10 | 14 | Ret | 3^{F} | 5 | 5 | 2^{F} | 583 |
| 1 | (Finland) Red Bull KTM Ajo | 99 | 1 | 3 | 1 | Ret | 1^{P F} | 1 | 1^{P} | 8^{P} | 4 | 1^{P} | 3 | 1^{F} | 5 | 5 | 2 | 1 | 2^{P F} | 1^{F} | 1 | DNS | | | 583 |
| 2 | (Spain) Frinsa – MT Helmets – MSi | 6 | Ret | 9 | 19 | 3^{P} | 5 | Ret | 8 | 9 | 10 | 11 | 15 | 9 | 2 | 14 | 9 | 8 | 6 | 8 | 22 | 4 | | | 423 |
| 2 | (Spain) Frinsa – MT Helmets – MSi | 13 | | | | | | | | | | | | | | | | | | | | | 12 | 14 | 423 |
| 2 | (Spain) Frinsa – MT Helmets – MSi | 36 | 12 | 1^{F} | 4 | 1 | 2 | Ret | Ret | 6 | 7 | 5 | 4^{F} | 4 | 1 | 4 | 1 | 5 | 11 | 7 | 17 | 2 | 2^{F} | 6 | 423 |
| 3 | (Spain) CFMoto Aspar Team | 28 | | | 5 | | | 7^{P} | 2 | 2 | 1 | 15 | 2 | 2 | 4 | 1^{P} | 12 | 2 | 3 | 4 | 5 | 6 | 1 | 5 | 383 |
| 3 | (Spain) CFMoto Aspar Team | 34 | Ret | 20 | | | | | | | | | | | | | | | | | | | | | 383 |
| 3 | (Spain) CFMoto Aspar Team | 71 | 6 | 11 | 7 | Ret | 13 | 11 | Ret | 15 | 3 | 8 | 11 | 5 | 7 | 11 | 19 | 13 | 10 | 12 | | | 14 | 21 | 383 |
| 3 | (Spain) CFMoto Aspar Team | 78 | | | | Ret | Ret | | | | | | | | | | | | | | 4 | 17 | | | 383 |
| 4 | (Germany) Liqui Moly Dynavolt Intact GP | 51 | | | | | | | | | | | | | | | | | | | 19 | 8 | | | 329 |
| 4 | (Germany) Liqui Moly Dynavolt Intact GP | 64 | Ret^{F} | Ret | Ret^{P} | 6^{F} | Ret | 3 | Ret | 1 | 5^{F} | 2 | 1 | 3 | 3 | 3^{F} | 8 | 7 | 1 | Ret | | | | | 329 |
| 4 | (Germany) Liqui Moly Dynavolt Intact GP | 67 | | | | | | | | | | | | | | | | | | | | | 6 | 13 | 329 |
| 4 | (Germany) Liqui Moly Dynavolt Intact GP | 94 | Ret | Ret | 11 | 10 | 7 | 17 | 7 | 19 | Ret | DNS | 7 | 10^{P} | 10 | Ret | 6 | 9 | 7 | 3 | 12 | 15 | Ret | 4 | 329 |
| 5 | (Luxembourg) Leopard Racing | 22 | 7 | 6 | 13 | 16 | Ret | 5 | 6 | 4 | Ret | 6 | Ret | 7 | 13 | 7 | 4^{P} | 14 | Ret | Ret | 9 | 3^{P} | 21 | 8 | 313 |
| 5 | (Luxembourg) Leopard Racing | 31 | 3 | 2 | 12 | Ret | 4 | 8 | | DNS | Ret | Ret | Ret | 6 | 9 | 6 | 5 | 3 | 5 | 6^{P} | 6 | DSQ | 9 | 1^{P} | 313 |
| 5 | (Luxembourg) Leopard Racing | 78 | | | | | | | NC | | | | | | | | | | | | | | | | 313 |
| 6 | (Italy) LevelUp – MTA | 18 | 5^{P} | 4^{P} | 3^{F} | | | | | | | | | | | | | | 13 | 11 | 10 | 19 | Ret | 19 | 274 |
| 6 | (Italy) LevelUp – MTA | 32 | | | | | 18 | 16 | 9 | 22 | | | | | | | | | | | | | | | 274 |
| 6 | (Italy) LevelUp – MTA | 66 | Ret | 8 | 2 | 4 | 3 | 2 | Ret | 7 | 9 | 9^{F} | 6 | DNS | 12 | 8 | 7 | 4 | 8 | 10 | 2^{P} | 11 | 7^{P} | 23 | 274 |
| 6 | (Italy) LevelUp – MTA | 89 | | | | | | | | | 16 | 10 | 10 | 11 | 16 | 15 | 15 | 21 | | | | | | | 274 |
| 7 | (France) Red Bull KTM Tech3 | 12 | | | 14 | 14 | 9 | 13 | 13 | Ret | 13 | 12 | 8 | 14 | 14 | 10 | Ret | 11 | 12 | 5 | Ret | DNS | | | 215 |
| 7 | (France) Red Bull KTM Tech3 | 73 | Ret | Ret | Ret | 15 | 10 | 10 | 5 | 13 | 8 | 3 | 12 | 8 | 8^{P} | 2 | 10 | 6^{P F} | 4 | DNS | 20 | 9 | Ret | 10 | 215 |
| 7 | (France) Red Bull KTM Tech3 | 78 | 9 | 16 | | | | | | | | | | | | | | | | | | | 4 | 16 | 215 |
| 8 | (Italy) Sic58 Squadra Corse | 48 | | | | | | | | | | | 17 | Ret | | | | | | | | | | | 179 |
| 8 | (Italy) Sic58 Squadra Corse | 58 | 10 | 7 | Ret | 7 | 11 | 9 | 3 | 5^{F} | Ret | Ret | | | | | 11 | Ret | 9 | 2 | 7 | 10 | 10 | 7 | 179 |
| 8 | (Italy) Sic58 Squadra Corse | 67 | | | | | | | | | | | | | 18 | 13 | | | | | | | | | 179 |
| 8 | (Italy) Sic58 Squadra Corse | 82 | 4 | 10 | Ret | 8 | 14 | Ret | 16 | NC | 14 | 13 | 13 | 17 | 24 | 17 | 23 | 18 | 15 | 9 | 15 | 21 | 18 | 11 | 179 |
| 9 | (Japan) Honda Team Asia | 2 | | | | | | | | | | | | | | | | | | | | | 19 | Ret | 173 |
| 9 | (Japan) Honda Team Asia | 5 | Ret | 21 | DNS | 19 | 15 | 19 | 19 | 20 | 17 | Ret | Ret | | | | | | | | 24 | 20 | | | 173 |
| 9 | (Japan) Honda Team Asia | 72 | Ret | 5 | 9 | 2 | 6 | 6 | 12^{F} | 11 | 6 | Ret | Ret | 16 | 6^{F} | Ret | 3^{F} | 12 | Ret | Ret | 8 | 1 | 3 | 3 | 173 |
| 9 | (Japan) Honda Team Asia | 93 | | | | | | | | | | | | | 22 | 20 | 24 | Ret | Ret | 19 | | | | | 173 |
| 10 | (France) CIP Green Power | 11 | 14 | 13 | 8 | | | | | | | | | | | | | | | | | | | 15 | 76 |
| 10 | (France) CIP Green Power | 19 | Ret | 12 | Ret | 12 | 12 | 12 | 11 | 12 | 12 | 7 | Ret^{P} | 15 | 15 | Ret | 14 | 15 | 21 | Ret | 14 | 7 | 8 | Ret | 76 |
| 10 | (France) CIP Green Power | 55 | | | | 17 | 16 | 20 | 18 | 16 | 19 | 16 | 16 | 19 | 23 | 18 | 21 | 19 | Ret | 17 | 23 | DNS | | | 76 |
| 11 | (Italy) Rivacold Snipers Team | 2 | | | | | | | | | | | | | | | | | | Ret | | | | | 62 |
| 11 | (Italy) Rivacold Snipers Team | 10 | Ret | 19 | 15 | 9 | Ret | 15 | 10 | 17 | 11 | Ret | 18 | Ret | 19 | 12 | 20 | 22 | DNS | | 13 | 13 | 15 | 18 | 62 |
| 11 | (Italy) Rivacold Snipers Team | 45 | | | | | | | | | | | | | | | | | | | | | Ret | 9 | 62 |
| 11 | (Italy) Rivacold Snipers Team | 54 | 8 | 18 | Ret | 5 | Ret | 18 | 15 | 18 | Ret | 14 | 14 | Ret | 20 | 19 | 16 | 20 | 20 | 18 | 25 | 17 | | | 62 |
| 12 | (Spain) Denssi Racing – Boé | 14 | 15 | 14 | 10 | Ret | 19 | 14 | 14 | 10 | 15 | Ret | 9 | DNS | Ret | Ret | Ret | 17 | 16 | 16 | 11 | Ret | 20 | 24 | 49 |
| 12 | (Spain) Denssi Racing – Boé | 21 | 11 | 15 | 16 | 13 | Ret | | 20 | 14 | Ret | | | | 17 | 16 | 18 | 16 | 19 | 13 | 21 | 18 | 17 | 22 | 49 |
| 12 | (Spain) Denssi Racing – Boé | 25 | | | | | | | | | | | Ret | | | | | | | | | | | | 49 |
| 12 | (Spain) Denssi Racing – Boé | 34 | | | | | | 21 | | | | 17 | | | | | | | | | | | | | 49 |
| 12 | (Spain) Denssi Racing – Boé | 95 | | | | | | | | | | | | 13 | | | | | | | | | | | 49 |
| 13 | (United Kingdom) Gryd – MLav Racing | 8 | Ret | 17 | 17 | 18 | Ret | Ret | 17 | 21 | 18 | Ret | Ret | 18 | 21 | Ret | 22 | Ret | 18 | 15 | 16 | 14 | 16 | 20 | 21 |
| 13 | (United Kingdom) Gryd – MLav Racing | 11 | | | | DNS | 17 | Ret | | | | | | | | | | | | | | | | | 21 |
| 13 | (United Kingdom) Gryd – MLav Racing | 25 | | | | | | | | | | Ret | | 20 | | 21 | | | | | | | | | 21 |
| 13 | (United Kingdom) Gryd – MLav Racing | 30 | | | | | | | 21 | | | | | | | | | | | | | | | | 21 |
| 13 | (United Kingdom) Gryd – MLav Racing | 32 | | | | | | | | | Ret | | DNS | | Ret | | | | | | | | | | 21 |
| 13 | (United Kingdom) Gryd – MLav Racing | 34 | | | 18 | | | | | | | | | | | | | | | | | | | | 21 |
| 13 | (United Kingdom) Gryd – MLav Racing | 52 | | | | | | | | | | | | | | | | Ret | | | | | | | 21 |
| 13 | (United Kingdom) Gryd – MLav Racing | 69 | | | | | | | | | | | | | | | | Ret | | | | | | | 21 |
| 13 | (United Kingdom) Gryd – MLav Racing | 89 | 13 | Ret | | | | | | 23 | | | | | | | | | | | | | | | 21 |
| 13 | (United Kingdom) Gryd – MLav Racing | 95 | | | | | | | | | | | | | | | 17 | | 17 | 14 | 18 | 12 | 11 | 12 | 21 |
| Pos. | Team | Bike No. | THA (Thailand) | ARG (Argentina) | AME (United States) | QAT (Qatar) | SPA (Spain) | FRA (France) | GBR (United Kingdom) | ARA (Aragon) | ITA (Italy) | NED (Netherlands) | GER (Germany) | CZE (Czech Republic) | AUT (Austria) | HUN (Hungary) | CAT (Catalonia) | RSM (San Marino) | JPN (Japan) | INA (Indonesia) | AUS (Australia) | MAL (Malaysia) | POR (Portugal) | VAL (Valencian Community) | Pts |
