= Joel Kelso =

Australian motorcycle racer (born 2003)

- Nationality: Australian
- Born: 12 June 2003 (age 23); Darwin, Northern Territory, Australia
- Current team: Gryd Racing
- Bike number: 66
Motorcycle racing career statistics
Moto3 World Championship
Active years	2021–
Manufacturers	KTM (2021–2022, 2024–2025); CFMoto (2023; Honda (2026–)
2025 championship position	6th (193 pts)
Starts / Wins / Podiums / Poles / F. laps / Points; 100 / 0 / 5 / 3 / 1 / 504
Supersport 300 World Championship
Active years	2019
Manufacturers	Kawasaki
Championships	0
2019 championship position	34th (4 pts)
Starts / Wins / Podiums / Poles / F. laps / Points; 1 / 0 / 0 / 0 / 0 / 4

Joel Damon Kelso (born 12 June 2003) is an Australian motorcycle racer who currently competes for Gryd Racing in the 2026 Moto3 World Championship. Previous years saw him with Boé Motorsports (2024), CFMoto Racing Prüstel GP (2023) and CIP Green Power (2022). Before the Moto3 World Championship, he competed in the FIM CEV Moto3 Junior World Championship from 2020 to 2021 with the AGR Team.

== Career ==
=== Moto3 ===
==== Gryd Racing (2026–) ====
On 14 September 2025, it was announced that Kelso would race for the MLav Racing Team in the upcoming 2026 Moto3 season.

Kelso will remain with Gryd Racing for the 2027 Moto3 season alongside Eddie O'Shea.

== Career statistics ==
=== Career highlights ===
- 2017: 1st, Australian Moto3 Championship

=== European Talent Cup ===
==== Races by year ====
(key) (Races in bold indicate pole position; races in italics indicate fastest lap)

Year	Bike	1	2	3	4	5	6	7	8	9	10	11	Pts	Pos
2019	Honda	EST	EST	VAL	VAL	CAT	ARA	ARA	JER; 12	JER; 11	ALB; 7	VAL; 5	17th	29

=== Supersport 300 World Championship ===
==== Races by year ====
(key) (Races in bold indicate pole position; races in italics indicate fastest lap)

Year	Bike	1	2	3	4	5	6	7	8	9	10	Pos	Pts
2019	Kawasaki	SPA	NED	ITA	SPA	SPA	ITA	GBR	POR; 12	FRA	QAT	34th	4

=== FIM CEV Moto3 Junior World Championship ===
==== Races by year ====
(key) (Races in bold indicate pole position, races in italics indicate fastest lap)

Year	Bike	1	2	3	4	5	6	7	8	9	10	11	12	Pos	Pts
2019	Honda	EST	VAL1	VAL2	FRA	CAT1; 25	CAT2; 29	ARA	JER1	JER2	ALB	VAL1	VAL2	NC	0
2020	KTM	EST; 21	POR; 20	JER1; 11	JER2; Ret	JER3; DNS	ARA1; 20	ARA2; 16	ARA3; Ret	VAL1; 9	VAL2; 12	VAL3; 14		18th	18
2021	KTM	EST; Ret	VAL1; Ret	VAL2; Ret	CAT1; 8	CAT2; 11	**POR**; 1	ARA; 8	JER1; 7	JER2; 7	RSM; 1	VAL3; 1	VAL4; 6	4th	124

=== Grand Prix motorcycle racing ===
==== By season ====
Season	Class	Motorcycle	Team	Race	Win	Podium	Pole	FLap	Pts	Plcd
2021	Moto3	KTM	CIP Green Power	4	0	0	0	0	2	31st
2022	Moto3	KTM	CIP Green Power	18	0	0	0	0	36	21st
2023	Moto3	CFMoto	CFMoto Racing Prüstel GP	18	0	1	0	0	61	17th
2024	Moto3	KTM	Boé Motorsports	20	0	0	1	0	138	9th
2025	Moto3	KTM	LevelUp – MTA	21	0	4	2	1	193	6th
2026	Moto3	Honda	Gryd Racing	19	0	0	0	0	74*	15th*
Total				**100**	**0**	**5**	**3**	**1**	**504**	

==== By class ====
Class	Seasons	1st GP	1st pod	1st win	Race	Win	Podiums	Pole	FLap	Pts	WChmp
Moto3	2021–present	2021 Germany	2023 Australia		100	0	5	3	1	504	0
Total	2021–present				**100**	**0**	**5**	**3**	**1**	**504**	**0**

==== Races by year ====
(key) (Races in bold indicate pole position; races in italics indicate fastest lap)

Year	Class	Bike	1	2	3	4	5	6	7	8	9	10	11	12	13	14	15	16	17	18	19	20	21	22	Pos	Pts
2021	Moto3	KTM	QAT	DOH	POR	SPA	FRA	ITA	CAT	GER; 17	NED; 22	STY	AUT	GBR	ARA	RSM	AME	EMI	ALR; 14	VAL; Ret					31st	2
2022	Moto3	KTM	QAT; 15	INA; 18	ARG; 10	AME; 18	POR; 9	SPA; Ret	FRA; DNS	ITA; 12	CAT; 12	GER; Ret	NED; Ret	GBR	AUT; 22	RSM; 14	ARA; 21	JPN; Ret	THA; 12	AUS; 8	MAL; 18	VAL; 21			21st	36
2023	Moto3	CFMoto	POR; 9	ARG	AME	SPA; 18	FRA; 11	ITA; Ret	GER; 22	NED; 9	GBR; 16	AUT; 16	CAT; DSQ	RSM; 19	IND; Ret	JPN; 15	INA; 16	AUS; 3	THA; 12	MAL; 7	QAT; 13	VAL; 7			17th	61
2024	Moto3	KTM	QAT; 8	POR; 5	AME; 7	SPA; 5	FRA; 13	CAT; Ret	ITA; 12	NED; 12	GER; 11	GBR; 7	AUT; 8	CAT; 5	RSM; 6	EMI; 7	INA; 8	JPN; 21	AUS; 11	**THA**; 7	MAL; 6	SLD; 12			9th	138
2025	Moto3	KTM	THA; Ret	ARG; 8	AME; 2	QAT; 4	SPA; 3	FRA; 2	GBR; Ret	ARA; 7	ITA; 9	NED; 9	GER; 6	CZE; DNS	AUT; 11	HUN; 8	CAT; 7	RSM; 4	JPN; 8	INA; 10	**AUS**; 2	MAL; 11	**POR**; 7	VAL; 23	6th	193
2026	Moto3	Honda	THA; 14	BRA; 12	USA; Ret	SPA; 14	FRA; Ret	CAT; 17	ITA; 9	HUN; 12	CZE; 8	NED; 8	GER; 14	GBR; 6	ARA; 13	RSM; 7	AUT; 11	JPN; 17	INA; Ret	AUS; C	MAL; Ret	QAT; 6	POR	VAL	15th*	74*

* Season still in progress.

=== Australian Superbike Championship ===
==== Races by year ====
(key) (Races in bold indicate pole position; races in italics indicate fastest lap)

Year	Bike	1		2		3		4			5		6			7		Pos	Pts
Year	Bike	R1	R2	R1	R2	R1	R2	R1	R2	R3	R1	R2	R1	R2	R3	R1	R2	Pos	Pts
2022	BMW	PHI	PHI	QUE	QUE	WAK	WAK	HID	HID	HID	MOR	MOR	PHI	PHI	PHI	BEN; 11	BEN; 10	26th	21
