= Scott Ogden =

British motorcycle racer

- Nationality: British
- Born: 16 October 2003 (age 23); Doncaster, South Yorkshire, England
- Current team: CIP Green Power
- Bike number: 19
Motorcycle racing career statistics
Moto3 World Championship
Active years	2022–
Manufacturers	Honda (2022–2024); KTM (2025–)
2025 championship position	15th (62 pts)
Starts / Wins / Podiums / Poles / F. laps / Points; 99 / 0 / 0 / 2 / 0 / 169

Scott Ogden (born 16 October 2003) is an English Grand Prix motorcycle racer, competing for CIP Green Power in the 2026 Moto3 World Championship.

For 2024, Ogden raced on Honda for MLav Racing.

Ogden won the Motostar Moto3 (Standard) British Championship in 2019, and spent 2020 and 2021 in the Spanish (CEV) Junior World Championship.

== Career ==
=== Moto3 World Championship ===
Ogden crashed out of the first Moto3 race of the season at Lusail on lap seven of 18, when running in 19th place. In the second race at Mandalika, he scored three points with a 13th-place finish.

In the third race of the season at Argentina on 3 April, Ogden failed to finish the race, pitting six laps before the end. For the fourth race of the season at Circuit of the Americas near Austin, Texas on 10 April, Ogden finished in 12th position, scoring four championship points.

At the fifth event held at Portimao, Portugal, in April, Ogden finished 13th.

== Career statistics ==
=== British Talent Cup ===
==== Races by year ====
(key) (Races in bold indicate pole position; races in italics indicate fastest lap)

Year	Bike	1	2	3	4	5	6	7	8	9	10	11	12	Pos	Pts
2018	Honda	DON1; 11	DON2; Ret	DON3; 4	DON4; Ret	SNE5; 6	SNE6; 4	SIL7; 7	SIL8; Ret	DON9; 10	DON10; Ret	SIL11; Ret	SIL12; 7	9th	65
2019	Honda	SIL1; 1	SIL2; 3	DON3; 2	DON4; 1	DON5; 1	DON6; 3	SNE7; 3	SNE8; 2	SIL9; 4	SIL10; 3	SIL11; 7	SIL12; 2	1st	221

=== Moto3 Standard Motostar ===
==== Races by year ====
(key) (Races in bold indicate pole position; races in italics indicate fastest lap)

Year	Bike	1	2	3	4	5	6	7	8	9	10	11	12	13	14	15	16	17	18	Pos	Pts
2019	Honda	OUL1; 2	OUL2; 1	BRA1; 1	BRA2; 1	KNO1; 2	KNO2; 9	THR1	THR2	CAD1; 1	CAD2; 1	OUL1; 1	OUL2; 2	ASS1; 2	ASS2; 2	DON1; 1	DON2; 2	BRA1; 2	BRA2	1st	322

=== Red Bull MotoGP Rookies Cup ===
==== Races by year ====
(key) (Races in bold indicate pole position; races in italics indicate fastest lap)

Year	1	2	3	4	5	6	7	8	9	10	11	12	13	14	Pos	Pts
2020	RBR1; 11	RBR1; 13	RBR2; DNS	RBR2; DNS	ARA1; 11	ARA1; 12	ARA2; 12	ARA2; 13	VAL1; Ret	VAL1; Ret	VAL2; 11	VAL2; 11			18th	34
2021	POR1; 9	POR2; 10	SPA1; 15	SPA2; 9	MUG1; 13	MUG2; 13	GER1; Ret	GER2; 9	RBR1; 21	RBR2; 14	RBR3; 7	RBR4; 9	ARA1; 11	ARA2; Ret	14th	57

=== FIM CEV Moto3 Junior World Championship ===
==== Races by year ====
(key) (Races in bold indicate pole position, races in italics indicate fastest lap)

Year	Bike	1	2	3	4	5	6	7	8	9	10	11	12	Pos	Pts
2019	Honda	EST	VAL1	VAL2	FRA	CAT1	CAT2	ARA	JER1; 24	JER2; 22	ALB; Ret	VAL1	VAL2	NC	0
2020	Honda	EST; Ret	POR; 10	JER1; Ret	JER2; 11	JER3; 10	ARA1; Ret	ARA2; 19	ARA3; 13	VAL1; 12	VAL2; Ret	VAL3; 8		15th	32
2021	GasGas	EST; 10	VAL1; 15	VAL2; 10	CAT1; 5	CAT2; 3	POR; 10	ARA; 15	JER1; 1	JER2; Ret	RSM; Ret	**VAL3**; 4	**VAL4**; 5	6th	96

=== Grand Prix motorcycle racing ===
==== By season ====
Season	Class	Motorcycle	Team	Race	Win	Podium	Pole	FLap	Pts	Plcd
2022	Moto3	Honda	VisionTrack Racing Team	20	0	0	0	0	21	23rd
2023	Moto3	Honda	VisionTrack Racing Team	18	0	0	0	0	24	23rd
2024	Moto3	Honda	MLav Racing	20	0	0	0	0	23	20th
2025	Moto3	KTM	CIP Green Power	22	0	0	1	0	62	15th
2026	Moto3	KTM	CIP Green Power	19	0	0	1	0	39*	21st*
Total				**99**	**0**	**0**	**2**	**0**	**169**	

==== By class ====
Class	Seasons	1st GP	1st pod	1st win	Race	Win	Podiums	Pole	FLap	Pts	WChmp
Moto3	2022–present	2022 Qatar			99	0	0	2	0	169	0
Total	2022–present				**99**	**0**	**0**	**2**	**0**	**169**	**0**

==== Races by year ====
(key) (Races in bold indicate pole position; races in italics indicate fastest lap)

Year	Class	Bike	1	2	3	4	5	6	7	8	9	10	11	12	13	14	15	16	17	18	19	20	21	22	Pos	Pts
2022	Moto3	Honda	QAT; Ret	INA; 13	ARG; Ret	AME; 12	POR; 13	SPA; 12	FRA; Ret	ITA; Ret	CAT; 14	GER; Ret	NED; Ret	GBR; 12	AUT; 21	RSM; 25	ARA; 22	JPN; 20	THA; 15	AUS; Ret	MAL; Ret	VAL; Ret			23rd	21
2023	Moto3	Honda	POR; Ret	ARG; 5	AME; 14	SPA; 12	FRA; Ret	ITA; 13	GER; 20	NED; 22	GBR; 17	AUT; 22	CAT; 15	RSM; 23	IND; Ret	JPN; 18	INA; Ret	AUS; DNQ	THA; 20	MAL; 13	QAT; 19	VAL; DNS			23rd	24
2024	Moto3	Honda	QAT; 13	POR; 14	AME; DSQ	SPA; 19	FRA; Ret	CAT; 16	ITA; 17	NED; 17	GER; 10	GBR; Ret	AUT; 19	CAT; 16	RSM; 15	EMI; 18	INA; 13	JPN; 19	AUS; 22	THA; 8	MAL; Ret	SLD; 17			20th	23
2025	Moto3	KTM	THA; Ret	ARG; 12	AME; Ret	QAT; 12	SPA; 12	FRA; 12	GBR; 11	ARA; 12	ITA; 12	NED; 7	**GER**; Ret	CZE; 15	AUT; 15	HUN; Ret	CAT; 14	RSM; 15	JPN; 21	INA; Ret	AUS; 14	MAL; 7	POR; 8	VAL; Ret	15th	62
2026	Moto3	KTM	THA; 12	BRA; Ret	USA; 10	SPA; 16	FRA; Ret	CAT; 18	ITA; 14	HUN; 11	CZE; 9	NED; 16	GER; 17	**GBR**; Ret	ARA; 15	RSM; 15	AUT; 15	JPN; 20	INA; 10	AUS; C	MAL; Ret	QAT; 10	POR	VAL	21st*	39*

* Season still in progress.
