= 2025 Hungarian motorcycle Grand Prix =

Motorcycle races in Balatonfőkajár

(Hungary) 2025 Hungarian Grand Prix
Race details
- Race 14 of 22 races in the 2025 Grand Prix motorcycle racing season
- Date: 24 August 2025
- Official name: Michelin Grand Prix of Hungary
- Location: Balaton Park Circuit; Balatonfőkajár, Veszprém County, Hungary
- Course: Permanent racing facility; 4.075 km (2.532 mi)

MotoGP
Pole position
Rider	(Spain) Marc Márquez	Ducati
Time	1:36.518	
Fastest lap
Rider	(Spain) Marc Márquez	Ducati
Time	1:37.699 on lap 12	
Podium
First	(Spain) Marc Márquez	Ducati
Second	(Spain) Pedro Acosta	KTM
Third	(Italy) Marco Bezzecchi	Aprilia

Moto2
Pole position
Rider	(Brazil) Diogo Moreira	Kalex
Time	1:40.380	
Fastest lap
Rider	(Colombia) David Alonso	Kalex
Time	1:40.964 on lap 16	
Podium
First	(Colombia) David Alonso	Kalex
Second	(Brazil) Diogo Moreira	Kalex
Third	(Spain) Manuel González	Kalex

Moto3
Pole position
Rider	(Spain) Máximo Quiles	KTM
Time	1:46.060	
Fastest lap
Rider	(Spain) David Muñoz	KTM
Time	1:45.700 on lap 9	
Podium
First	(Spain) Máximo Quiles	KTM
Second	(Argentina) Valentín Perrone	KTM
Third	(Spain) David Muñoz	KTM

MotoE Race 1
Pole position
Rider	(Italy) Mattia Casadei	Ducati
Time	1:45.600	
Fastest lap
Rider	(Italy) Lorenzo Baldassarri	Ducati
Time	1:45.999 on lap 3	
Podium
First	(Italy) Mattia Casadei	Ducati
Second	(Italy) Lorenzo Baldassarri	Ducati
Third	(Brazil) Eric Granado	Ducati

MotoE Race 2
Pole position
Rider	(Italy) Mattia Casadei	Ducati
Time	1:45.600	
Fastest lap
Rider	(Italy) Matteo Ferrari	Ducati
Time	1:45.268 on lap 6	
Podium
First	(Italy) Mattia Casadei	Ducati
Second	(Italy) Nicholas Spinelli	Ducati
Third	(Italy) Matteo Ferrari	Ducati

The 2025 Hungarian motorcycle Grand Prix (officially known as the Michelin Grand Prix of Hungary) was the fourteenth round of the 2025 Grand Prix motorcycle racing season and the fourth round of the 2025 MotoE World Championship. All races (except for both MotoE races which were held on 23 August) were held at the Balaton Park Circuit in Balatonfőkajár on 24 August 2025.

This Grand Prix marked the return of MotoGP in Hungary, having held the last Grand Prix in 1992.

== MotoGP Sprint ==
The MotoGP Sprint was held on 23 August 2025.

Pos.	No.	Rider	Team	Manufacturer	Laps	Time/Retired	Grid	Points
1	93	(Spain) Marc Márquez	Ducati Lenovo Team	Ducati	13	21:13.465	1	12
2	49	(Italy) Fabio Di Giannantonio	Pertamina Enduro VR46 Racing Team	Ducati	13	+2.095	3	9
3	21	(Italy) Franco Morbidelli	Pertamina Enduro VR46 Racing Team	Ducati	13	+3.595	5	7
4	10	(Italy) Luca Marini	Honda HRC Castrol	Honda	13	+4.890	9	6
5	54	(Spain) Fermín Aldeguer	BK8 Gresini Racing MotoGP	Ducati	13	+5.692	8	5
6	36	(Spain) Joan Mir	Honda HRC Castrol	Honda	13	+6.147	10	4
7	72	(Italy) Marco Bezzecchi	Aprilia Racing	Aprilia	13	+6.266	2	3
8	73	(Spain) Álex Márquez	BK8 Gresini Racing MotoGP	Ducati	13	+7.332	11	2
9	1	(Spain) Jorge Martín	Aprilia Racing	Aprilia	13	+10.779	17	1
10	44	(Spain) Pol Espargaró	Red Bull KTM Tech3	KTM	13	+12.905	12	
11	25	(Spain) Raúl Fernández	Trackhouse MotoGP Team	Aprilia	13	+13.148	16	
12	43	(Australia) Jack Miller	Prima Pramac Yamaha MotoGP	Yamaha	13	+14.097	14	
13	63	(Italy) Francesco Bagnaia	Ducati Lenovo Team	Ducati	13	+14.891	15	
14	88	(Portugal) Miguel Oliveira	Prima Pramac Yamaha MotoGP	Yamaha	13	+15.342	19	
15	79	(Japan) Ai Ogura	Trackhouse MotoGP Team	Aprilia	13	+15.467	21	
16	42	(Spain) Álex Rins	Monster Energy Yamaha MotoGP Team	Yamaha	13	+21.007	20	
17	37	(Spain) Pedro Acosta	Red Bull KTM Factory Racing	KTM	13	+22.245	7	
18	33	(South Africa) Brad Binder	Red Bull KTM Factory Racing	KTM	12	+1 lap	13	
Ret	23	(Italy) Enea Bastianini	Red Bull KTM Tech3	KTM	0	Collision	4	
Ret	20	(France) Fabio Quartararo	Monster Energy Yamaha MotoGP Team	Yamaha	0	Collision	6	
Ret	5	(France) Johann Zarco	LCR Honda Castrol	Honda	0	Collision	18	
Fastest sprint lap: (Spain) Marc Márquez (Ducati) – 1:37.315 (lap 6)
OFFICIAL MOTOGP SPRINT REPORT

== Race ==
=== MotoGP ===
Pos.	No.	Rider	Team	Manufacturer	Laps	Time/Retired	Grid	Points
1	93	(Spain) Marc Márquez	Ducati Lenovo Team	Ducati	26	42:37.681	1	25
2	37	(Spain) Pedro Acosta	Red Bull KTM Factory Racing	KTM	26	+4.314	7	20
3	72	(Italy) Marco Bezzecchi	Aprilia Racing	Aprilia	26	+7.488	2	16
4	1	(Spain) Jorge Martín	Aprilia Racing	Aprilia	26	+11.069	16	13
5	10	(Italy) Luca Marini	Honda HRC Castrol	Honda	26	+11.904	9	11
6	21	(Italy) Franco Morbidelli	Pertamina Enduro VR46 Racing Team	Ducati	26	+12.608	5	10
7	33	(South Africa) Brad Binder	Red Bull KTM Factory Racing	KTM	26	+12.902	12	9
8	44	(Spain) Pol Espargaró	Red Bull KTM Tech3	KTM	26	+14.015	11	8
9	63	(Italy) Francesco Bagnaia	Ducati Lenovo Team	Ducati	26	+14.854	13	7
10	20	(France) Fabio Quartararo	Monster Energy Yamaha MotoGP Team	Yamaha	26	+15.473	6	6
11	79	(Japan) Ai Ogura	Trackhouse MotoGP Team	Aprilia	26	+18.112	21	5
12	88	(Portugal) Miguel Oliveira	Prima Pramac Yamaha MotoGP	Yamaha	26	+19.021	19	4
13	42	(Spain) Álex Rins	Monster Energy Yamaha MotoGP Team	Yamaha	26	+22.861	20	3
14	73	(Spain) Álex Márquez	BK8 Gresini Racing MotoGP	Ducati	26	+25.938	14 (Note: 3-place grid penalty due to impeding riders in practice)	2
15	49	(Italy) Fabio Di Giannantonio	Pertamina Enduro VR46 Racing Team	Ducati	26	+26.262	3	1
16	54	(Spain) Fermín Aldeguer	BK8 Gresini Racing MotoGP	Ducati	26	+55.239	8	
Ret	5	(France) Johann Zarco	LCR Honda Castrol	Honda	20	Crashed out	18	
Ret	43	(Australia) Jack Miller	Prima Pramac Yamaha MotoGP	Yamaha	16	Retired in pits	17	
Ret	25	(Spain) Raúl Fernández	Trackhouse MotoGP Team	Aprilia	12	Retired in pits	15	
Ret	36	(Spain) Joan Mir	Honda HRC Castrol	Honda	4	Retired in pits	10	
Ret	23	(Italy) Enea Bastianini	Red Bull KTM Tech3	KTM	1	Retired in pits	4	
Fastest lap: (Spain) Marc Márquez (Ducati) – 1:37.699 (lap 12)
OFFICIAL MOTOGP RACE REPORT

=== Moto2 ===
Pos.	No.	Rider	Team	Manufacturer	Laps	Time/Retired	Grid	Points
1	80	(Colombia) David Alonso	CFMoto Inde Aspar Team	Kalex	22	37:18.405	8	25
2	10	(Brazil) Diogo Moreira	Italtrans Racing Team	Kalex	22	+0.174	1	20
3	18	(Spain) Manuel González	Liqui Moly Dynavolt Intact GP	Kalex	22	+0.305	3	16
4	96	(United Kingdom) Jake Dixon	Elf Marc VDS Racing Team	Boscoscuro	22	+0.876	4	13
5	95	(Netherlands) Collin Veijer	Red Bull KTM Ajo	Kalex	22	+1.344	5	11
6	44	(Spain) Arón Canet	Fantic Racing Lino Sonego	Kalex	22	+2.608	6	10
7	99	(Spain) Adrián Huertas	Italtrans Racing Team	Kalex	22	+3.984	12	9
8	12	(Czech Republic) Filip Salač	Elf Marc VDS Racing Team	Boscoscuro	22	+6.462	10	8
9	27	(Spain) Daniel Holgado	CFMoto Inde Aspar Team	Kalex	22	+8.126	7	7
10	4	(Spain) Iván Ortolá	QJMotor – Frinsa – MSi	Boscoscuro	22	+9.015	18	6
11	24	(Spain) Marcos Ramírez	OnlyFans American Racing Team	Kalex	22	+11.696	11	5
12	7	(Belgium) Barry Baltus	Fantic Racing Lino Sonego	Kalex	22	+14.240	15	4
13	84	(Netherlands) Zonta van den Goorbergh	RW-Idrofoglia Racing GP	Kalex	22	+14.639	2	3
14	75	(Spain) Albert Arenas	Italjet Gresini Moto2	Kalex	22	+14.919	24	2
15	14	(Italy) Tony Arbolino	Blu Cru Pramac Yamaha Moto2	Boscoscuro	22	+15.626	22	1
16	3	(Spain) Sergio García	Liqui Moly Dynavolt Intact GP	Kalex	22	+17.333	27	
17	11	(Spain) Álex Escrig	Klint Forward Factory Team	Forward	22	+18.130	17	
18	9	(Spain) Jorge Navarro	Klint Forward Factory Team	Forward	22	+20.438	19	
19	16	(United States) Joe Roberts	OnlyFans American Racing Team	Kalex	22	+22.834	13	
20	17	(Spain) Daniel Muñoz	Red Bull KTM Ajo	Kalex	22	+26.552	20	
21	41	(Thailand) Nakarin Atiratphuvapat	Idemitsu Honda Team Asia	Kalex	22	+55.534	28	
Ret	71	(Japan) Ayumu Sasaki	RW-Idrofoglia Racing GP	Kalex	20	Accident	9	
Ret	28	(Spain) Izan Guevara	Blu Cru Pramac Yamaha Moto2	Boscoscuro	15	Retired in pits	16	
Ret	13	(Italy) Celestino Vietti	Sync SpeedRS Team	Boscoscuro	12	Retired in pits	23	
Ret	21	(Spain) Alonso López	Sync SpeedRS Team	Boscoscuro	11	Accident	14	
Ret	15	(South Africa) Darryn Binder	Italjet Gresini Moto2	Kalex	6	Retired in pits	21	
Ret	92	(Japan) Yuki Kunii	Idemitsu Honda Team Asia	Kalex	0	Accident	25	
Ret	19	(Spain) Unai Orradre	QJMotor – Frinsa – MSi[	Boscoscuro	0	Accident	26	
Fastest lap: (Colombia) David Alonso (Kalex) – 1:40.964 (lap 16)
OFFICIAL MOTO2 RACE REPORT

=== Moto3 ===
Pos.	No.	Rider	Team	Manufacturer	Laps	Time/Retired	Grid	Points
1	28	(Spain) Máximo Quiles	CFMoto Gaviota Aspar Team	KTM	20	35:31.839	1	25
2	73	(Argentina) Valentín Perrone	Red Bull KTM Tech3	KTM	20	+0.018	2	20
3	64	(Spain) David Muñoz	Liqui Moly Dynavolt Intact GP	KTM	20	+0.858	5	16
4	36	(Spain) Ángel Piqueras	Frinsa – MT Helmets – MSi	KTM	20	+0.952	3	13
5	99	(Spain) José Antonio Rueda	Red Bull KTM Ajo	KTM	20	+1.362	8	11
6	31	(Spain) Adrián Fernández	Leopard Racing	Honda	20	+6.159	9	10
7	22	(Spain) David Almansa	Leopard Racing	Honda	20	+9.546	10	9
8	66	(Australia) Joel Kelso	LevelUp – MTA	KTM	20	+10.025	14	8
9	83	(Spain) Álvaro Carpe	Red Bull KTM Ajo	KTM	20	+11.696	4	7
10	12	(Australia) Jacob Roulstone	Red Bull KTM Tech3	KTM	20	+20.109	7	6
11	71	(Italy) Dennis Foggia	CFMoto Gaviota Aspar Team	KTM	20	+24.862	11	5
12	10	(Italy) Nicola Carraro	Rivacold Snipers Team	Honda	20	+26.871	13	4
13	67	(Republic of Ireland) Casey O'Gorman	Sic58 Squadra Corse	Honda	20	+32.279	18	3
14	6	(Japan) Ryusei Yamanaka	Frinsa – MT Helmets – MSi	KTM	20	+36.636	16	2
15	89	(Spain) Marcos Uriarte	LevelUp – MTA	KTM	20	+37.394	26 (Note: Back of the grid penalty for riding slowly during practice)	1
16	21	(South Africa) Ruché Moodley	Denssi Racing – Boé	KTM	20	+40.701	20	
17	82	(Italy) Stefano Nepa	Sic58 Squadra Corse	Honda	20	+41.674	25	
18	55	(Switzerland) Noah Dettwiler	CIP Green Power	KTM	20	+44.069	23	
19	54	(Italy) Riccardo Rossi	Rivacold Snipers Team	Honda	20	+45.803	17	
20	93	(Indonesia) Arbi Aditama	Honda Team Asia	Honda	20	+53.120	22	
21	25	(Italy) Leonardo Abruzzo	Gryd – MLav Racing	Honda	20	+1:00.634	24	
Ret	19	(United Kingdom) Scott Ogden	CIP Green Power	KTM	17	Accident	15	
Ret	72	(Japan) Taiyo Furusato	Honda Team Asia	Honda	16	Accident	12	
Ret	94	(Italy) Guido Pini	Liqui Moly Dynavolt Intact GP	KTM	14	Accident	6	
Ret	14	(New Zealand) Cormac Buchanan	Denssi Racing – Boé	KTM	12	Accident	19	
Ret	8	(United Kingdom) Eddie O'Shea	Gryd – MLav Racing	Honda	4	Retired in pits	21	
Fastest lap: (Spain) David Muñoz (KTM) – 1:45.700 (lap 9)
OFFICIAL MOTO3 RACE REPORT

=== MotoE ===
==== Race 1 ====
Pos.	No.	Rider	Team	Manufacturer	Laps	Time/Retired	Grid	Points
1	40	(Italy) Mattia Casadei	LCR E-Team	Ducati	4	7:07.266	1	25
2	7	(Italy) Lorenzo Baldassarri	Dynavolt Intact GP MotoE	Ducati	4	+0.106	2	20
3	51	(Brazil) Eric Granado	LCR E-Team	Ducati	4	+0.790	3	16
4	11	(Italy) Matteo Ferrari	Felo Gresini MotoE	Ducati	4	+1.543	7	13
5 (Note: 1-position penalty for exceeding track limits on the final lap)	61	(Italy) Alessandro Zaccone	Aruba Cloud MotoE Team	Ducati	4	+1.289	6	11
6	29	(Italy) Nicholas Spinelli	Rivacold Snipers Team MotoE	Ducati	4	+2.377	5	10
7	1	(Spain) Héctor Garzó	Dynavolt Intact GP MotoE	Ducati	4	+3.045	11	9
8	21	(Italy) Kevin Zannoni	Power Electronics Aspar Team	Ducati	4	+5.032	12	8
9	99	(Spain) Óscar Gutiérrez	MSi Racing Team	Ducati	4	+5.230	13	7
10	9	(Italy) Andrea Mantovani	Klint Forward Factory Team	Ducati	4	+5.392	15	6
11	77	(Italy) Raffaele Fusco	Ongetta Sic58 Squadra Corse	Ducati	4	+7.336	16	5
12	72	(Italy) Alessio Finello	Felo Gresini MotoE	Ducati	4	+8.561	14	4
13	6	(Spain) María Herrera	Klint Forward Factory Team	Ducati	4	+8.668	17	3
14	28	(Italy) Tommaso Occhi	Ongetta Sic58 Squadra Corse	Ducati	4	+18.030	18	2
Ret	12	(Romania) Jacopo Hosciuc	MSi Racing Team	Ducati	2	Accident	9	
DNS	81	(Spain) Jordi Torres	Power Electronics Aspar Team	Ducati		Accident (Note: Crashed out, causing a red flag before 3 laps had been completed. Did not restart)	8	
DNS	47	(Hungary) Tibor Erik Varga	Rivacold Snipers Team MotoE	Ducati		Accident	4	
DNS	19	(San Marino) Luca Bernardi	Aruba Cloud MotoE Team	Ducati		Accident	10	
Fastest lap: (Italy) Lorenzo Baldassarri (Ducati) – 1:45.999 (lap 3)
OFFICIAL MOTOE RACE 1 REPORT

==== Race 2 ====
Pos.	No.	Rider	Team	Manufacturer	Laps	Time/Retired	Grid	Points
1	40	(Italy) Mattia Casadei	LCR E-Team	Ducati	7	12:24.299	1	25
2	29	(Italy) Nicholas Spinelli	Rivacold Snipers Team MotoE	Ducati	7	+0.554	4	20
3	11	(Italy) Matteo Ferrari	Felo Gresini MotoE	Ducati	7	+1.433	6	16
4	7	(Italy) Lorenzo Baldassarri	Dynavolt Intact GP MotoE	Ducati	7	+1.932	2	13
5	1	(Spain) Héctor Garzó	Dynavolt Intact GP MotoE	Ducati	7	+2.151	10	11
6	61	(Italy) Alessandro Zaccone	Aruba Cloud MotoE Team	Ducati	7	+2.388	5	10
7	51	(Brazil) Eric Granado	LCR E-Team	Ducati	7	+2.861	3	9
8	12	(Romania) Jacopo Hosciuc	MSi Racing Team	Ducati	7	+4.348	8	8
9	9	(Italy) Andrea Mantovani	Klint Forward Factory Team	Ducati	7	+6.065	14	7
10	21	(Italy) Kevin Zannoni	Power Electronics Aspar Team	Ducati	7	+8.369	11	6
11	81	(Spain) Jordi Torres	Power Electronics Aspar Team	Ducati	7	+9.807	7	5
12	19	(San Marino) Luca Bernardi	Aruba Cloud MotoE Team	Ducati	7	+11.339	9	4
13	72	(Italy) Alessio Finello	Felo Gresini MotoE	Ducati	7	+13.288	13	3
14	77	(Italy) Raffaele Fusco	Ongetta Sic58 Squadra Corse	Ducati	7	+13.736	15	2
15	6	(Spain) María Herrera	Klint Forward Factory Team	Ducati	7	+13.887	16	1
16	28	(Italy) Tommaso Occhi	Ongetta Sic58 Squadra Corse	Ducati	7	+27.317	17	
Ret	99	(Spain) Óscar Gutiérrez	MSi Racing Team	Ducati	3	Retired in pits	12	
Fastest lap: (Italy) Matteo Ferrari (Ducati) – 1:45.268 (lap 6)
OFFICIAL MOTOE RACE 2 REPORT

== Championship standings after the race ==
Below are the standings for the top five riders, constructors, and teams after the round.

=== MotoGP ===
Riders' Championship standings

	Pos.	Rider	Points
	1	(Spain) Marc Márquez	455
	2	(Spain) Álex Márquez	280
	3	(Italy) Francesco Bagnaia	228
	4	(Italy) Marco Bezzecchi	197
2	5	(Spain) Pedro Acosta	164

Constructors' Championship standings

Pos.	Constructor	Points
1	(Italy) Ducati	504
2	(Italy) Aprilia	228
3	(Austria) KTM	215
4	(Japan) Honda	175
5	(Japan) Yamaha	140

Teams' Championship standings

Pos.	Team	Points
1	(Italy) Ducati Lenovo Team	683
2	(Italy) BK8 Gresini Racing MotoGP	406
3	(Italy) Pertamina Enduro VR46 Racing Team	315
4	(Austria) Red Bull KTM Factory Racing	255
5	(Italy) Aprilia Racing	228

=== Moto2 ===
Riders' Championship standings

Pos.	Rider	Points
1	(Spain) Manuel González	204
2	(Spain) Arón Canet	179
3	(Brazil) Diogo Moreira	173
4	(Belgium) Barry Baltus	147
5	(United Kingdom) Jake Dixon	132

Constructors' Championship standings

Pos.	Constructor	Points
1	(Germany) Kalex	333
2	(Italy) Boscoscuro	190
3	(Switzerland) Forward	13

Teams' Championship standings

	Pos.	Team	Points
	1	(Italy) Fantic Racing Lino Sonego	326
	2	(Germany) Liqui Moly Dynavolt Intact GP	297
	3	(Belgium) Elf Marc VDS Racing Team	211
2	4	(Italy) Italtrans Racing Team	189
1	5	(United States) OnlyFans American Racing Team	169

=== Moto3 ===
Riders' Championship standings

	Pos.	Rider	Points
	1	(Spain) José Antonio Rueda	250
	2	(Spain) Ángel Piqueras	181
1	3	(Spain) Máximo Quiles	164
1	4	(Spain) David Muñoz	155
	5	(Spain) Álvaro Carpe	146

Constructors' Championship standings

Pos.	Constructor	Points
1	(Austria) KTM	350
2	(Japan) Honda	169

Teams' Championship standings

Pos.	Team	Points
1	(Finland) Red Bull KTM Ajo	396
2	(Spain) Frinsa – MT Helmets – MSi	271
3	(Spain) CFMoto Gaviota Aspar Team	245
4	(Germany) Liqui Moly Dynavolt Intact GP	206
5	(Italy) LevelUp – MTA	188

=== MotoE ===
Riders' Championship standings

	Pos.	Rider	Points
4	1	(Italy) Mattia Casadei	116
1	2	(Italy) Lorenzo Baldassarri	102
2	3	(Italy) Andrea Mantovani	101
2	4	(Italy) Alessandro Zaccone	101
1	5	(Italy) Matteo Ferrari	94

Teams' Championship standings

	Pos.	Team	Points
	1	(Germany) Dynavolt Intact GP	176
2	2	(Monaco) LCR E-Team	175
1	3	(Spain) Power Electronics Aspar Team	135
1	4	(Switzerland) Klint Forward Factory Team	130
2	5	(Italy) Felo Gresini MotoE	127

== Notes ==
Previous race: 2025 Austrian Grand Prix	FIM Grand Prix World Championship; 2025 season	Next race: 2025 Catalan Grand Prix
Previous race: 1992 Hungarian Grand Prix	Hungarian motorcycle Grand Prix	Next race: 2026 Hungarian Grand Prix
