= O'Gorman =

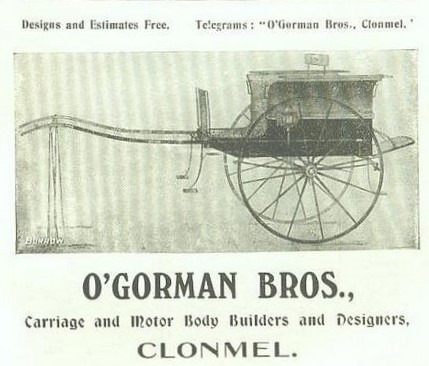
Advert for O'Gorman Bros.

O'Gorman is a surname. Notable people with the surname include:

- Áine O'Gorman (born 1989), Irish footballer
- Camila O'Gorman (1828–1848), wealthy socialite and figure of scandal in 19th century Argentina
- Casey O'Gorman (born 1996), English television personality
- Casey O'Gorman (motorcyclist) (born 2007), Irish Grand Prix motorcycle racer
- Chevalier O'Gorman (1732–1809), Irish soldier and genealogist
- Colm O'Gorman (born 1966), founder and director of One in Four, a national Irish charity
- Dave O'Gorman (David O'Gorman; born 1972), English football winger
- David O'Gorman (c. 1865 – 1945), Irish politician
- Dean O'Gorman (born 1976), New Zealand actor, artist, and photographer
- Denis O'Gorman (hurler) (1914–2005), former Irish sportsman who played hurling with Tipperary
- Denis O'Gorman (athlete) (1928–2011), British Olympic long-distance runner
- Dick O'Gorman, Irish hurler
- Edmundo O'Gorman (1906–1995), Mexican writer, historian and philosopher
- James Aloysius O'Gorman (1860–1943), one-term United States Senator from New York
- James F. O'Gorman (born 1933), American architectural historian, taught at Wellesley College
- James Myles O'Gorman, (1804–1874), Irish-born bishop of the Catholic Church in the United States
- Joe O'Gorman (Joseph George O'Gorman; 1890–1974), British entertainer and cricketer
- John O'Gorman (piper) (born 1860s), Irish piper
- Juan O'Gorman (1905–1982), Mexican artist, painter and architect
- Kieran O'Gorman (born 1972), Irish hurler
- Larry O'Gorman (born 1968), former Irish sportsman who played hurling with Wexford in the 1990s
- Marie O'Gorman, Irish camogie player
- Mervyn O'Gorman (1871–1958), Irish-born electrical and aeronautical engineer
- Michael O'Gorman (footballer) (also known as Mick Minahan; 1874–1937), Australian rules footballer
- Michael O'Gorman (rowing) (1965–2018), American coxswain
- Ned O'Gorman (1929–2014), American poet and educator
- Noel O'Gorman (born 1944), Irish hurler
- Patrick O'Gorman, Irish Fine Gael politician
- Purcell O'Gorman (1820–1888), Irish nationalist politician and Member of Parliament in the House of Commons of the United Kingdom
- Robert O'Gorman (umpire), Australian rules football umpire
- Roderic O'Gorman (born 1983), Irish politician, Chairman of the Green Party (from 2011)
- Seán O'Gorman (born 1960), Irish hurler
- Terence O'Gorman (1919–2003), a poet from the Republic of Ireland
- Terry O'Gorman, Australian lawyer, president of the Australian Council for Civil Liberties
- Tim O'Gorman (born 1967), former cricketer who played for Derbyshire
- Thomas O'Gorman (1843–1921), American prelate of the Roman Catholic Church, Bishop of Sioux Falls (1896–1921)
- Tony O'Gorman (born 1958), Australian politician, member of the Western Australian Legislative Assembly (2001–2013)
- Wayne O'Gorman, Irish Gaelic footballer, and hurler

== See also ==
- Gorman (related surname)
- O'Gorman High School (disambiguation)
