= Gorman =

Gorman may refer to:

== People ==
- Gorman (surname) and list of people with the surname

== Places ==
=== Canada ===
- Gorman, Edmonton, Alberta

=== United States ===
- Gorman, California
- Gorman, Maryland
- Gorman, North Carolina
- Gorman, South Dakota
- Gorman, Texas
- Gorman Township, Otter Tail County, Minnesota

== Other ==
- Gorman (brand), Australian women's fashion label
- Bishop Gorman High School, private high school in Las Vegas, Nevada affiliated with the Roman Catholic Church
- Siebe Gorman, British commercial diving equipment company
- C.N. Gorman Museum, art museum located in Davis, California

== See also ==
- Are You Dave Gorman?, British television show featuring Dave Gorman
- Wilson–Gorman Tariff Act, or the Revenue Act, 1894, reduced U.S. tariff rates from the 1890 McKinley tariff
- Justice Gorman (disambiguation)
- O'Gorman, a surname
