= James O'Gorman =

James O'Gorman may refer to:

- James Myles O'Gorman (1804–1874), Irish-born bishop of the Catholic Church in the United States
- James A. O'Gorman (1860–1943), United States senator from New York
- James F. O'Gorman (born 1933), American architectural historian, taught at Wellesley College

== See also ==
- O'Gorman
