= 2026 Moto3 World Championship =

15th running of the Moto3 World Championship

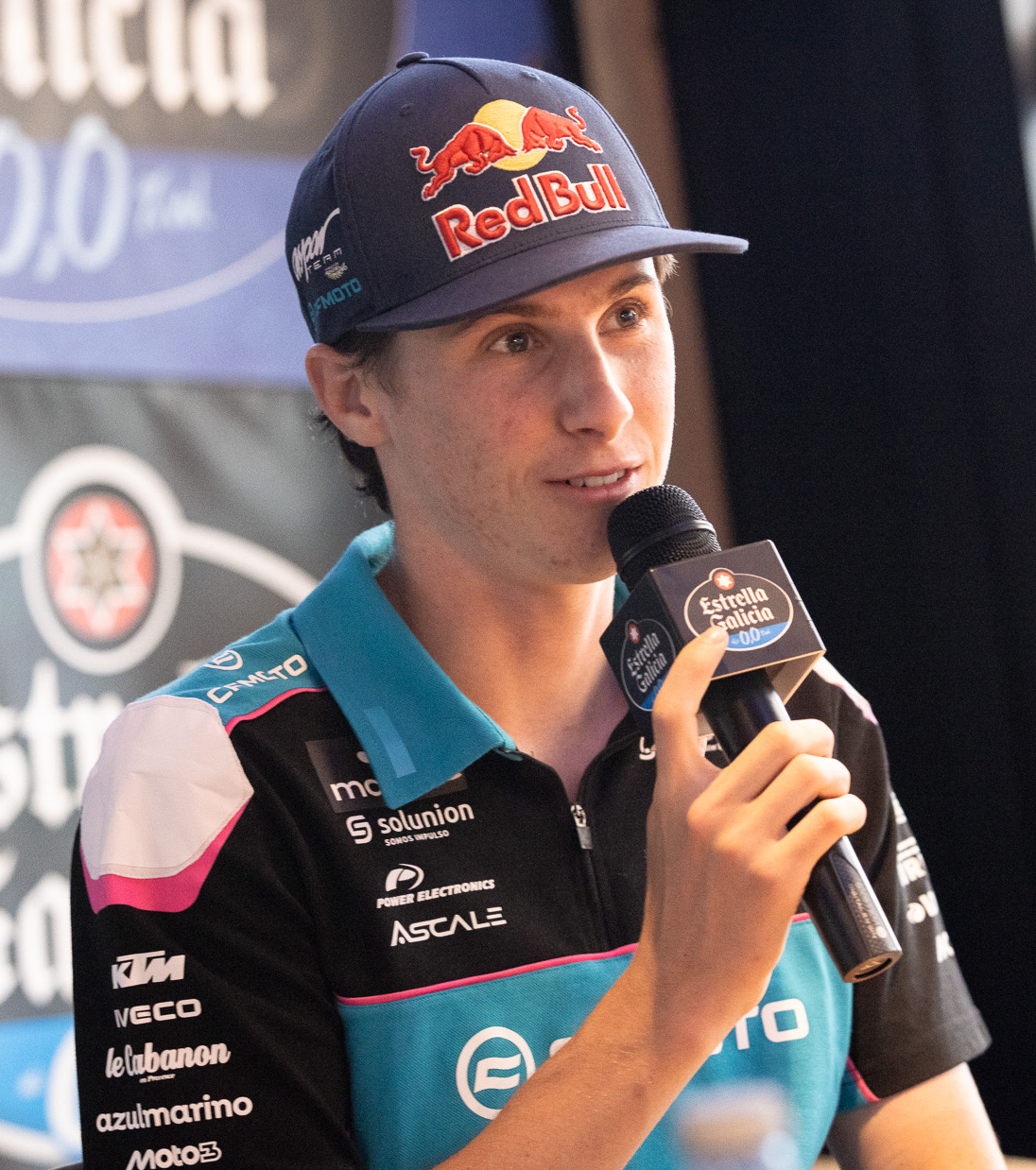
Máximo Quiles was the 2026 Moto3 World Riders' Champion.

The 2026 FIM Moto3 World Championship is the lightweight class of the 78th Fédération Internationale de Motocyclisme (FIM) Road Racing World Championship season. Máximo Quiles won the championship title with five races to spare after winning the Grand Prix of Indonesia.

== Teams and riders ==
Team	Constructor	Motorcycle	No.	Rider	Rounds
(United Kingdom) Gryd Racing (Note: For rounds 1–7, the team used the name Gryd – MLav Racing.)	Honda	NSF250RW	8	(United Kingdom) Eddie O'Shea	1–21
(United Kingdom) Gryd Racing	Honda	NSF250RW	66	(Australia) Joel Kelso	1–21
(Japan) Honda Team Asia	Honda	NSF250RW	9	(Indonesia) Veda Pratama	1–21
(Japan) Honda Team Asia	Honda	NSF250RW	32	(Japan) Zen Mitani	1–10, 13–21
(Japan) Honda Team Asia	Honda	NSF250RW	85	(Thailand) Kiattisak Singhapong	12
(Luxembourg) Leopard Racing	Honda	NSF250RW	31	(Spain) Adrián Fernández	1–21
(Luxembourg) Leopard Racing	Honda	NSF250RW	94	(Italy) Guido Pini	1–21
(Italy) Rivacold Snipers Team	Honda	NSF250RW	10	(Italy) Nicola Carraro	1–15
(Italy) Rivacold Snipers Team	Honda	NSF250RW	85	(Thailand) Kiattisak Singhapong	16–21
(Italy) Rivacold Snipers Team	Honda	NSF250RW	54	(Spain) Jesús Ríos	1–21
(Italy) Sic58 Squadra Corse	Honda	NSF250RW	5	(Austria) Leo Rammerstorfer	1–21
(Italy) Sic58 Squadra Corse	Honda	NSF250RW	67	(Republic of Ireland) Casey O'Gorman	1–21
(Spain) Aeon Credit – MT Helmets – MSi	KTM	RC250GP	6	(Japan) Ryusei Yamanaka	1–21
(Spain) Aeon Credit – MT Helmets – MSi	KTM	RC250GP	13	(Malaysia) Hakim Danish	1–21
(Spain) CFMoto Aspar Team (Note: This is the team name entered in the championship. Other team names used during the season are CFMoto Gaviota Aspar Team (rounds 1–2, 4–6, 8–11, 14–21), CFMoto Valresa Aspar Team (rounds 3, 7, 12), and CFMoto Viel Aspar Team (round 13).)	KTM	RC250GP	28	(Spain) Máximo Quiles	1–21
(Spain) CFMoto Aspar Team	KTM	RC250GP	97	(Argentina) Marco Morelli	1–21
(France) CIP Green Power	KTM	RC250GP	11	(Spain) Adrián Cruces	1–21
(France) CIP Green Power	KTM	RC250GP	19	(United Kingdom) Scott Ogden	1–21
(Spain) Code Motorsports	KTM	RC250GP	14	(New Zealand) Cormac Buchanan	1–13, 21
(Spain) Code Motorsports	KTM	RC250GP	88	(Spain) Marcos Uriarte	14–15
(Spain) Code Motorsports	KTM	RC250GP	79	(Japan) Ryota Ogiwara	16–17
(Spain) Code Motorsports	KTM	RC250GP	37	(Australia) Marianos Nikolis	18
(Spain) Code Motorsports	KTM	RC250GP	45	(South Africa) Kgopotso Mononyane	20
(Spain) Code Motorsports	KTM	RC250GP	21	(South Africa) Ruché Moodley	1–10, 13–21
(Spain) Code Motorsports	KTM	RC250GP	41	(Spain) Eduardo Gutiérrez	11
(Spain) Code Motorsports	KTM	RC250GP	25	(Italy) Leonardo Abruzzo	12
(Italy) LevelUp – MTA	KTM	RC250GP	18	(Italy) Matteo Bertelle	1–20
(Italy) LevelUp – MTA	KTM	RC250GP	7	(Spain) Beñat Fernández	21
(Italy) LevelUp – MTA	KTM	RC250GP	78	(Spain) Joel Esteban	1–21
(Germany) Liqui Moly Dynavolt Intact GP	KTM	RC250GP	22	(Spain) David Almansa	1–2, 4–21
(Germany) Liqui Moly Dynavolt Intact GP	KTM	RC250GP	64	(Spain) David Muñoz	1, 4–8, 15–21
(Germany) Liqui Moly Dynavolt Intact GP	KTM	RC250GP	88	(Spain) Marcos Uriarte	3, 9–11
(Germany) Liqui Moly Dynavolt Intact GP	KTM	RC250GP	71	(Spain) David González	12–14
(Finland) Red Bull KTM Ajo	KTM	RC250GP	51	(Spain) Brian Uriarte	1–21
(Finland) Red Bull KTM Ajo	KTM	RC250GP	83	(Spain) Álvaro Carpe	1–21
(France) Red Bull KTM Tech3	KTM	RC250GP	27	(Finland) Rico Salmela	1–21
(France) Red Bull KTM Tech3	KTM	RC250GP	73	(Argentina) Valentín Perrone	1–21

Key
Regular rider
Replacement rider
Wildcard rider

All teams used series-specified Pirelli tyres.

=== Rider changes ===
- Marco Morelli, who was already appointed as a replacement rider for several teams during the 2025 season, made his full-time debut with CFMoto Aspar Team to join Máximo Quiles as his new teammate. He replaced Dennis Foggia, who left both the team and the class.
- Joel Kelso left the LevelUp – MTA team to join forces with Gryd Racing on a two-year deal.
- Guido Pini left Liqui Moly Dynavolt Intact GP after just one season to join Leopard Racing, switching teams with David Almansa, who joined Liqui Moly Dynavolt Intact GP in place of Pini.
- 2025 Red Bull Rookies Cup Champion Brian Uriarte made his full-time debut in the lightweight class by joining Red Bull KTM Ajo, replacing 2025 Moto3 World Champion José Antonio Rueda who stepped up to the intermediate class with the same team.
- Rico Salmela made his Grand Prix debut by joining Red Bull KTM Tech3, replacing Jacob Roulstone who left both the team and the class.
- Sic58 Squadra Corse fielded an all new lineup as both Luca Lunetta and Stefano Nepa left the team. Casey O'Gorman is set to make his full-time debut in the Moto3 class with the Italian squad in place for Lunetta, who stepped up to the intermediate class with SpeedRS Team. Leo Rammerstorfer was announced as O'Gorman's teammate, though the seat was initially going to be taken by Swiss rider Noah Dettwiler, before his accident at the 2025 Malaysian Grand Prix left him with injuries too severe to recover in time for the new season.
- Adrián Cruces, who was already appointed as a replacement rider by CIP Green Power for the injured Noah Dettwiler for the first three races of the 2025 season, made his full-time debut with the same team.
- Hakim Danish, who already made his Grand Prix debut in Moto3 with MT-Helmets MSi as a wildcard rider at the 2025 Malaysian Grand Prix, made his full-time debut with the same team, replacing Ángel Piqueras, who stepped up to the intermediate class.
- Honda Team Asia fielded an all new lineup as both Asia Talent Cup champions Zen Mitani and Veda Pratama made their respective full-time debuts in Grand Prix racing by replacing both Tatchakorn Buasri and Taiyo Furusato. While Buasri left both the team and the class, Furusato stepped up to the intermediate class with the same team.
- Jesús Ríos made his full-time debut in the class with Rivacold Snipers Team, replacing Riccardo Rossi, whom he already replaced at the final two rounds of the previous season. Rossi left both the team and the class to join Renzo Corse Ducati squad in order to compete in the 2026 Supersport World Championship.
- Joel Esteban made his return in the lightweight class by joining the LevelUp – MTA team after being appointed as a replacement rider for several teams during the 2025 season. He replaced Joel Kelso who made to Gryd Racing.

==== Mid-season changes ====
- David Muñoz missed the rounds in Brazil and the United States due to a broken femur he sustained in Indonesia the year before. His teammate David Almansa also missed the round in the United States after he suffered a fractured left elbow in Brazil. Marcos Uriarte raced in their place in the United States.
- David Muñoz suffered fractures to his pelvis and left arm following an accident in Hungary. He was replaced by Marcos Uriarte in Czechia, the Netherlands, and Germany, and then by David González in the United Kingdom, Aragon, and Misano.
- Ruché Moodley suffered a broken left hand following an accident in the Netherlands. He was replaced by Eduardo Gutiérrez in Germany and Leonardo Abruzzo in the United Kingdom.
- Zen Mitani suffered a broken right hand following an accident in the Netherlands. He was replaced by Kiattisak Singhapong in the United Kingdom.
- Cormac Buchanan suffered a fracture to his right ankle following an accident in Aragon. He was replaced by Marcos Uriarte in Misano and Austria, Ryota Ogiwara in Japan and Indonesia, Marianos Nikolis in Australia, and Kgopotso Mononyane in Qatar.
- Nicola Carraro parted ways with Rivacold Snipers Team ahead of Japan. He was replaced by Kiattisak Singhapong.
- Matteo Bertelle, still continuing his recovery from a fracture of the first metacarpal in his left hand, which he sustained in a highside crash during FP1 at the Qatar round. He was replaced by Beñat Fernández in Portugal.

== Calendar ==
The following Grands Prix are provisionally scheduled to take place in 2026:

Round	Date	Grand Prix	Circuit	Ref.
1	1 March	PT Grand Prix of Thailand	Buriram International Circuit, Buriram	
2	22 March	Estrella Galicia 0,0 Grand Prix of Brazil	Autódromo Internacional Ayrton Senna, Goiânia	
3	29 March	Red Bull Grand Prix of the United States	Circuit of the Americas, Austin	
4	26 April	Estrella Galicia 0,0 Grand Prix of Spain	Circuito de Jerez, Jerez de la Frontera	
5	10 May	Michelin Grand Prix of France	Bugatti Circuit, Le Mans	
6	17 May	(Catalonia) Monster Energy Grand Prix of Catalunya	Circuit de Barcelona-Catalunya, Montmeló	
7	31 May	Brembo Grand Prix of Italy	Mugello Circuit, Scarperia e San Piero	
8	7 June	Grand Prix of Hungary	Balaton Park Circuit, Balatonfőkajár	
9	21 June	(Czech Republic) Monster Energy Grand Prix of Czechia	Brno Circuit, Brno	
10	28 June	Tissot Grand Prix of the Netherlands	TT Circuit Assen, Assen	
11	12 July	Liqui Moly Grand Prix of Germany	Sachsenring, Hohenstein-Ernstthal	
12	9 August	(United Kingdom) Qatar Airways Grand Prix of Great Britain	Silverstone Circuit, Silverstone	
13	30 August	Michelin Grand Prix of Aragon	MotorLand Aragón, Alcañiz	
14	13 September	Red Bull Grand Prix of San Marino and the Rimini Riviera	Misano World Circuit, Misano Adriatico	
15	20 September	Qatar Airways Grand Prix of Austria	Red Bull Ring, Spielberg	
16	4 October	Motul Grand Prix of Japan	Motegi Circuit, Motegi	
17	11 October	Pertamina Grand Prix of Indonesia	Mandalika International Street Circuit, Mandalika	
18	25 October (Note: Race cancelled due to inclement weather and low visibility which affected the medical helicopter's ability to fly.)	Red Bull Grand Prix of Australia	Phillip Island Grand Prix Circuit, Phillip Island	
19	1 November	Petronas Grand Prix of Malaysia	Sepang International Circuit, Sepang	
20	8 November (Note: Race was originally scheduled on 12 April, but was rescheduled due to the ongoing Iran war.)	Qatar Airways Grand Prix of Qatar	Lusail International Circuit, Lusail	
21	22 November (Note: Race was originally scheduled on 15 November, but was rescheduled due to the new date of the Qatar GP.)	Repsol Grand Prix of Portugal	Algarve International Circuit, Portimão	
22	29 November (Note: Race was originally scheduled on 22 November, but was rescheduled due to the new date of the Qatar GP.)	(Valencian Community) Motul Grand Prix of Valencia	Circuit Ricardo Tormo, Valencia	

=== Grand Prix locations ===
Location of non-European Grands Prix in 2026.
(scheduled Grand Prix: cancelled Grand Prix)
Location of European Grands Prix in 2026.

=== Calendar changes ===
- Brazil returned to the calendar after a 21-year absence. The last race held in the country took place in 2004 at the Jacarepaguá Circuit in Rio de Janeiro, where it was known as the Rio de Janeiro Grand Prix.
- The Argentine Grand Prix did not return to the calendar this year, as the organisers have confirmed in a statement, aiming to return in 2027. The Argentine Grand Prix came back onto the calendar in 2014 at the new Autódromo Termas de Río Hondo venue, having previously been held on and off in Buenos Aires between 1961 and 1999. However on 21 July 2025, Dorna announced that the Argentine Grand Prix would have a new home starting in the 2027 season. Work is currently underway to return to the Autódromo Oscar y Juan Gálvez.
- Due to the ongoing Iran war, the Qatar Grand Prix, originally scheduled for 12 April, was postponed to 8 November. The Portuguese and Valencian Grands Prix were also rescheduled to a week later.

== Results and standings ==
=== Grands Prix ===
Round	Grand Prix	Pole position	Fastest lap	Winning rider	Winning team	Winning constructor	Report
1	Thailand motorcycle Grand Prix	(Spain) David Almansa	(Argentina) Valentín Perrone	(Spain) David Almansa	(Germany) Liqui Moly Dynavolt Intact GP	(Austria) KTM	Report
2	(Brazil) Brazilian motorcycle Grand Prix	(Spain) Joel Esteban	(Argentina) Marco Morelli	(Spain) Máximo Quiles	(Spain) CFMoto Gaviota Aspar Team	(Austria) KTM	Report
3	United States motorcycle Grand Prix	(Spain) Álvaro Carpe	(Italy) Guido Pini	(Italy) Guido Pini	(Luxembourg) Leopard Racing	(Japan) Honda	Report
4	(Spain) Spanish motorcycle Grand Prix	(Spain) Máximo Quiles	(Spain) Adrián Fernández (Note: Adrián Fernández originally set the fastest lap in the race but was disqualified from the first six races of the season for engine tampering. Máximo Quiles, who recorded the second fastest lap in the race, inherited the fastest lap statistic. However, Fernández's team Leopard Racing appealed the disqualification and won the appeal verdict, thus reinstating Fernández's results in the first six races.)	(Spain) Máximo Quiles	(Spain) CFMoto Gaviota Aspar Team	(Austria) KTM	Report
5	(France) French motorcycle Grand Prix	(Spain) Adrián Fernández (Note: Adrián Fernández originally set the fastest time in qualifying and started the race from pole position, but was disqualified from the first six races (including qualifying) of the season for engine tampering. Máximo Quiles, who qualified and started second, inherited the pole position statistic. However, Fernández's team Leopard Racing appealed the disqualification and won the appeal verdict, thus reinstating Fernández's results in the first six races.)	(Italy) Matteo Bertelle	(Spain) Máximo Quiles	(Spain) CFMoto Gaviota Aspar Team	(Austria) KTM	Report
6	(Catalonia) Catalan motorcycle Grand Prix	(Argentina) Valentín Perrone	(Spain) David Almansa	(Spain) Máximo Quiles	(Spain) CFMoto Gaviota Aspar Team	(Austria) KTM	Report
7	(Italy) Italian motorcycle Grand Prix	(Spain) David Almansa	(Spain) Máximo Quiles	(Spain) Brian Uriarte	(Finland) Red Bull KTM Ajo	(Austria) KTM	Report
8	(Hungary) Hungarian motorcycle Grand Prix	(Spain) David Almansa	(Spain) David Almansa	(Spain) Máximo Quiles	(Spain) CFMoto Gaviota Aspar Team	(Austria) KTM	Report
9	(Czech Republic) Czech motorcycle Grand Prix	(Spain) David Almansa	(Indonesia) Veda Pratama	(Malaysia) Hakim Danish	(Spain) Aeon Credit – MT Helmets – MSi	(Austria) KTM	Report
10	(Netherlands) Dutch TT	(Spain) Máximo Quiles	(Republic of Ireland) Casey O'Gorman	(Spain) Máximo Quiles	(Spain) CFMoto Gaviota Aspar Team	(Austria) KTM	Report
11	(Germany) German motorcycle Grand Prix	(Spain) Brian Uriarte	(Spain) Máximo Quiles	(Spain) Brian Uriarte	(Finland) Red Bull KTM Ajo	(Austria) KTM	Report
12	(United Kingdom) British motorcycle Grand Prix	(United Kingdom) Scott Ogden	(Spain) Álvaro Carpe	(Spain) David Almansa	(Germany) Liqui Moly Dynavolt Intact GP	(Austria) KTM	Report
13	Aragon motorcycle Grand Prix	(Spain) David Almansa	(Argentina) Marco Morelli	(Spain) Máximo Quiles	(Spain) CFMoto Viel Aspar Team	(Austria) KTM	Report
14	San Marino and Rimini Riviera motorcycle Grand Prix	(Spain) David Almansa	(Spain) Máximo Quiles	(Spain) Máximo Quiles	(Spain) CFMoto Gaviota Aspar Team	(Austria) KTM	Report
15	(Austria) Austrian motorcycle Grand Prix	(Spain) Brian Uriarte	(Spain) David Almansa	(Spain) Máximo Quiles	(Spain) CFMoto Gaviota Aspar Team	(Austria) KTM	Report
16	(Japan) Japanese motorcycle Grand Prix	(Spain) David Almansa	(Spain) Brian Uriarte	(Spain) David Almansa	(Germany) Liqui Moly Dynavolt Intact GP	(Austria) KTM	Report
17	(Indonesia) Indonesian motorcycle Grand Prix	(Spain) Brian Uriarte	(Italy) Matteo Bertelle	(Spain) Máximo Quiles	(Spain) CFMoto Gaviota Aspar Team	(Austria) KTM	Report
18	(Australia) Australian motorcycle Grand Prix	(Indonesia) Veda Pratama	Race cancelled				Report
19	(Malaysia) Malaysian motorcycle Grand Prix	(Spain) Máximo Quiles	(Spain) Álvaro Carpe	(Spain) Máximo Quiles	(Spain) CFMoto Gaviota Aspar Team	(Austria) KTM	Report
20	Qatar motorcycle Grand Prix	(Spain) Máximo Quiles	(Spain) David Almansa	(Spain) David Almansa	(Germany) Liqui Moly Dynavolt Intact GP	(Austria) KTM	Report
21	(Portugal) Portuguese motorcycle Grand Prix	(Spain) David Almansa	(Spain) Adrián Fernández	(Spain) Máximo Quiles	(Spain) CFMoto Gaviota Aspar Team	(Austria) KTM	Report
22	(Valencian Community) Valencian motorcycle Grand Prix						Report

=== Riders' standings ===
Scoring system

Points are awarded to the top fifteen finishers. A rider has to finish the race to earn points.

Position	1st	2nd	3rd	4th	5th	6th	7th	8th	9th	10th	11th	12th	13th	14th	15th
Points	25	20	16	13	11	10	9	8	7	6	5	4	3	2	1

Pos.	Rider	Bike	Team	THA (Thailand)	BRA (Brazil)	USA (United States)	SPA (Spain)	FRA (France)	CAT (Catalonia)	ITA (Italy)	HUN (Hungary)	CZE (Czech Republic)	NED (Netherlands)	GER (Germany)	GBR (United Kingdom)	ARA (Aragon)	RSM (San Marino)	AUT (Austria)	JPN (Japan)	INA (Indonesia)	AUS (Australia)	MAL (Malaysia)	QAT (Qatar)	POR (Portugal)	VAL (Valencian Community)	Pts
1	(Spain) Máximo Quiles	KTM	CFMoto Aspar Team	2	1	2	1^{P}	1	1	11^{F}	1	3	1^{P}	2^{F}	DNS	1	1^{F}	1	2	1	C	1^{P}	3^{P}	1		417
2	(Spain) David Almansa	KTM	Liqui Moly Dynavolt Intact GP	1^{P}	Ret		8	8	4^{F}	DNS^{P}	2^{P F}	4^{P}	2	DNS	1	2^{P}	2^{P}	Ret^{F}	1^{P}	2	C	5	1^{F}	4^{P}		266
3	(Spain) Álvaro Carpe	KTM	Red Bull KTM Ajo	4	4	3^{P}	5	Ret	2	2	3	6	Ret	11	2^{F}	4	17	3	3	Ret	C	3^{F}	5	8		224
4	(Spain) Brian Uriarte	KTM	Red Bull KTM Ajo	7	11	7	11	15	DSQ	1	4	2	6	1^{P}	19	5	3	2^{P}	4^{F}	3^{P}	C	9	14	6		217
5	(Spain) Adrián Fernández	Honda	Leopard Racing	6	8	5	2^{F}	2^{P}	8	4	10	14	9	6	4	10	14	Ret	13	7	C	7	2	3^{F}		193
6	(Indonesia) Veda Pratama	Honda	Honda Team Asia	5	3	Ret	6	4	7	8	16	5^{F}	Ret	8	9	20	18	13	11	6	C^{P}	2	4	Ret		144
7	(Argentina) Marco Morelli	KTM	CFMoto Aspar Team	8	2^{F}	12	4	13	5	13	7	7	3	4	16	3^{F}	9	8	18	18	C	20	15	21		141
8	(Argentina) Valentín Perrone	KTM	Red Bull KTM Tech3	3^{F}	7	4	7	11	11^{P}	18	NC	10	4	Ret	3	8	5	12	14	13	C	15	16	10		127
9	(Malaysia) Hakim Danish	KTM	Aeon Credit – MT Helmets – MSi	18	10	13	13	10	6	3	Ret	1	7	12	Ret	12	12	9	12	14	C	4	7	16		125
10	(Finland) Rico Salmela	KTM	Red Bull KTM Tech3	19	6	6	15	Ret	16	Ret	5	Ret	11	5	7	22	6	Ret	5	5	C	Ret	12	2		113
11	(Italy) Matteo Bertelle	KTM	LevelUp – MTA	Ret	Ret	9	Ret	3^{F}	13	12	15	11	14	3	10	11	4	14	6	4^{F}	C	Ret	DNS			103
12	(Italy) Guido Pini	Honda	Leopard Racing	20	5	1^{F}	Ret	6	20	15	Ret	16	18	15	13	9	19	5	Ret	8	C	12	11	7		95
13	(Australia) Joel Kelso	Honda	Gryd Racing	14	12	Ret	14	Ret	17	9	12	8	8	14	6	13	7	11	17	Ret	C	Ret	6	5		85
14	(Spain) Adrián Cruces	KTM	CIP Green Power	13	13	8	20	7	12	17	6	12	Ret	Ret	Ret	6	8	7	10	12	C	14	Ret	12		84
15	(Spain) Joel Esteban	KTM	LevelUp – MTA	9	Ret^{P}	Ret	10	5	15	5	13	Ret	12	Ret	5	16	Ret	16	9	9	C	6	Ret	11		83
16	(Spain) David Muñoz	KTM	Liqui Moly Dynavolt Intact GP	10			3	18	3	7	NC							Ret	7	Ret	C	8	8	13		75
18	(Republic of Ireland) Casey O'Gorman	Honda	Sic58 Squadra Corse	11	9	Ret	12	Ret	9	Ret	9	Ret	10^{F}	Ret	12	7	10	6	15	Ret	C	16	18	14		68
17	(United Kingdom) Eddie O'Shea	Honda	Gryd Racing	15	15	11	18	9	10	6	18	Ret	15	10	8	14	16	4	Ret	19	C	10	Ret	18		66
19	(Japan) Ryusei Yamanaka	KTM	Aeon Credit – MT Helmets – MSi	24	14	18	17	12	14	16	17	15	13	9	Ret	21	13	10	8	11	C	11	9	Ret		53
20	(Spain) Jesús Ríos	Honda	Rivacold Snipers Team	17	Ret	15	9	Ret	Ret	10	8	17	5	7	11	Ret	20	21	19	15	C	NC	17	15		49
21	(United Kingdom) Scott Ogden	KTM	CIP Green Power	12	Ret	10	16	Ret	18	14	11	9	16	17	Ret^{P}	15	15	15	20	10	C	Ret	10	9		46
22	(Spain) David González	KTM	Liqui Moly Dynavolt Intact GP												14	18	11									7
23	(Japan) Zen Mitani	Honda	Honda Team Asia	22	16	Ret	21	16	21	22	20	19	Ret			23	22	18	21	16	C	13	13	20		6
24	(Spain) Marcos Uriarte	KTM	Liqui Moly Dynavolt Intact GP			14						13	Ret	18												5
24	(Spain) Marcos Uriarte	KTM	Code Motorsports														23	17								5
25	(New Zealand) Cormac Buchanan	KTM	Code Motorsports	Ret	18	19	19	Ret	23	19	14	18	Ret	13	Ret	Ret								22		5
26	(Austria) Leo Rammerstorfer	Honda	Sic58 Squadra Corse	16	Ret	20	DNS	14	22	23	19	Ret	17	16	17	17	Ret	20	Ret	Ret	C	18	20	17		2
27	(Thailand) Kiattisak Singhapong	Honda	Honda Team Asia												15											1
27	(Thailand) Kiattisak Singhapong	Honda	Rivacold Snipers Team																Ret	17	C	17	19	24		1
28	(South Africa) Ruché Moodley	KTM	Code Motorsports	21	Ret	16	22	17	19	21	Ret	20	DNS			19	21	19	22	20	C	19	21	23		0
29	(Japan) Ryota Ogiwara	KTM	Code Motorsports																16	Ret						0
30	(Italy) Nicola Carraro	Honda	Rivacold Snipers Team	23	17	17	Ret	Ret	Ret	20	Ret	Ret	19	19	Ret	Ret	Ret	22								0
31	(Italy) Leonardo Abruzzo	KTM	Code Motorsports												18											0
32	(Spain) Beñat Fernandez	KTM	LevelUp – MTA																					19		0
33	(Spain) Eduardo Gutiérrez	KTM	Code Motorsports											20												0
34	(South Africa) Kgopotso Mononyane	KTM	Code Motorsports																				22			0
—	(Australia) Marianos Nikolis	KTM	Code Motorsports																		C					0
Pos.	Rider	Bike	Team	THA (Thailand)	BRA (Brazil)	USA (United States)	SPA (Spain)	FRA (France)	CAT (Catalonia)	ITA (Italy)	HUN (Hungary)	CZE (Czech Republic)	NED (Netherlands)	GER (Germany)	GBR (United Kingdom)	ARA (Aragon)	RSM (San Marino)	AUT (Austria)	JPN (Japan)	INA (Indonesia)	AUS (Australia)	MAL (Malaysia)	QAT (Qatar)	POR (Portugal)	VAL (Valencian Community)	Pts

Race key
Colour	Result
Gold	Winner
Silver	2nd place
Bronze	3rd place
Green	Points finish
Blue	Non-points finish
Blue	Non-classified finish (NC)
Purple	Retired (Ret)
Red	Did not qualify (DNQ)
Black	Disqualified (DSQ)
White	Did not start (DNS)
White	Withdrew (WD)
White	Race cancelled (C)
Blank	Did not practice (DNP)
Blank	Excluded (EX)
Blank	Did not arrive (DNA)
Blank	Did not enter (empty cell)
Annotation	Meaning
P	Pole position
F	Fastest lap
Rider key
Colour	Meaning
Light blue	Rookie rider

=== Constructors' standings ===
Each constructor is awarded the same number of points as their best placed rider in each race.

Pos.	Constructor	THA (Thailand)	BRA (Brazil)	USA (United States)	SPA (Spain)	FRA (France)	CAT (Catalonia)	ITA (Italy)	HUN (Hungary)	CZE (Czech Republic)	NED (Netherlands)	GER (Germany)	GBR (United Kingdom)	ARA (Aragon)	RSM (San Marino)	AUT (Austria)	JPN (Japan)	INA (Indonesia)	AUS (Australia)	MAL (Malaysia)	QAT (Qatar)	POR (Portugal)	VAL (Valencian Community)	Pts
1	(Austria) KTM	1	1	2	1	1	1	1	1	1	1	1	1	1	1	1	1	1	C	1	1	1		495
2	(Japan) Honda	5	3	1	2	2	7	4	8	5	5	6	4	7	7	4	11	6	C	2	2	3		269
Pos.	Constructor	THA (Thailand)	BRA (Brazil)	USA (United States)	SPA (Spain)	FRA (France)	CAT (Catalonia)	ITA (Italy)	HUN (Hungary)	CZE (Czech Republic)	NED (Netherlands)	GER (Germany)	GBR (United Kingdom)	ARA (Aragon)	RSM (San Marino)	AUT (Austria)	JPN (Japan)	INA (Indonesia)	AUS (Australia)	MAL (Malaysia)	QAT (Qatar)	POR (Portugal)	VAL (Valencian Community)	Pts

=== Teams' standings ===
The teams' standings are based on results obtained by regular and substitute riders; wild-card entries are ineligible.

Pos.	Team	Bike No.	THA (Thailand)	BRA (Brazil)	USA (United States)	SPA (Spain)	FRA (France)	CAT (Catalonia)	ITA (Italy)	HUN (Hungary)	CZE (Czech Republic)	NED (Netherlands)	GER (Germany)	GBR (United Kingdom)	ARA (Aragon)	RSM (San Marino)	AUT (Austria)	JPN (Japan)	INA (Indonesia)	AUS (Australia)	MAL (Malaysia)	QAT (Qatar)	POR (Portugal)	VAL (Valencian Community)	Pts
1	(Spain) CFMoto Aspar Team	28	2	1	2	1^{P}	1	1	11^{F}	1	3	1^{P}	2^{F}	DNS	1	1^{F}	1	2	1	C	1^{P}	3^{P}			533
1	(Spain) CFMoto Aspar Team	97	8	2^{F}	12	4	13	5	13	7	7	3	4	16	3^{F}	9	8	18	18	C	20	15			533
2	(Finland) Red Bull KTM Ajo	51	7	11	7	11	15	DSQ	1	4	2	6	1^{P}	19	5	3	2^{P}	4^{F}	3^{P}	C	9	14			423
2	(Finland) Red Bull KTM Ajo	83	4	4	3^{P}	5	Ret	2	2	3	6	Ret	11	2^{F}	4	17	3	3	Ret	C	3^{F}	5			423
3	(Germany) Liqui Moly Dynavolt Intact GP	22	1^{P}	Ret		8	8	4^{F}	DNS^{P}	2^{P F}	4^{P}	2	DNS	1	2^{P}	2^{P}	Ret^{F}	1^{P}	2	C	5	1^{F}			337
3	(Germany) Liqui Moly Dynavolt Intact GP	64	10			3	18	3	7	NC							Ret	7	Ret	C	8	8			337
3	(Germany) Liqui Moly Dynavolt Intact GP	71												14	18	11									337
3	(Germany) Liqui Moly Dynavolt Intact GP	88			14						13	Ret	18												337
4	(Luxembourg) Leopard Racing	31	6	8	5	2^{F}	2^{P}	8	4	10	14	9	6	4	10	14	Ret	13	7	C	7	2			263
4	(Luxembourg) Leopard Racing	94	20	5	1^{F}	Ret	6	20	15	Ret	16	18	15	13	9	19	5	Ret	8	C	12	11			263
5	(France) Red Bull KTM Tech3	27	19	6	6	15	Ret	16	Ret	5	Ret	11	5	7	22	6	Ret	5	5	C	Ret	12			214
5	(France) Red Bull KTM Tech3	73	3^{F}	7	4	7	11	11^{P}	18	NC	10	4	Ret	3	8	5	12	14	13	C	15	16			214
6	(Italy) LevelUp – MTA	18	Ret	Ret	9	Ret	3^{F}	13	12	15	11	14	3	10	11	4	14	6	4^{F}	C	Ret	DNS			181
6	(Italy) LevelUp – MTA	78	9	Ret^{P}	Ret	10	5	15	5	13	Ret	12	Ret	5	16	Ret	16	9	9	C	6	Ret			181
7	(Spain) Aeon Credit – MT Helmets – MSi	6	24	14	18	17	12	14	16	17	15	13	9	Ret	21	13	10	8	11	C	11	9			178
7	(Spain) Aeon Credit – MT Helmets – MSi	13	18	10	13	13	10	6	3	Ret	1	7	12	Ret	12	12	9	12	14	C	4	7			178
8	(Japan) Honda Team Asia	9	5	3	Ret	6	4	7	8	16	5^{F}	Ret	8	9	20	18	13	11	6	C^{P}	2	4			151
8	(Japan) Honda Team Asia	32	22	16	Ret	21	16	21	22	20	19	Ret			23	22	18	21	16	C	13	13			151
8	(Japan) Honda Team Asia	85												15											151
9	(United Kingdom) Gryd Racing	8	15	15	11	18	9	10	6	18	Ret	15	10	8	14	16	4	Ret	19	C	10	Ret			140
9	(United Kingdom) Gryd Racing	66	14	12	Ret	14	Ret	17	9	12	8	8	14	6	13	7	11	17	Ret	C	Ret	6			140
10	(France) CIP Green Power	11	13	13	8	20	7	12	17	6	12	Ret	Ret	Ret	6	8	7	10	12	C	14	Ret			119
10	(France) CIP Green Power	19	12	Ret	10	16	Ret	18	14	11	9	16	17	Ret^{P}	15	15	15	20	10	C	Ret	10			119
11	(Italy) Sic58 Squadra Corse	5	16	Ret	20	DNS	14	22	23	19	Ret	17	16	17	17	Ret	20	Ret	Ret	C	18	20			68
11	(Italy) Sic58 Squadra Corse	67	11	9	Ret	12	Ret	9	Ret	9	Ret	10^{F}	Ret	12	7	10	6	15	Ret	C	16	18			68
12	(Italy) Rivacold Snipers Team	10	23	17	17	Ret	Ret	Ret	20	Ret	Ret	19	19	Ret	Ret	Ret	22								48
12	(Italy) Rivacold Snipers Team	54	17	Ret	15	9	Ret	Ret	10	8	17	5	7	11	Ret	20	21	19	15	C	NC	17			48
12	(Italy) Rivacold Snipers Team	85																Ret	17	C	17	19			48
13	(Spain) Code Motorsports	14	Ret	18	19	19	Ret	23	19	14	18	Ret	13	Ret	Ret										5
13	(Spain) Code Motorsports	21	21	Ret	16	22	17	19	21	Ret	20	DNS			19	21	19	22	20	C	19	21			5
13	(Spain) Code Motorsports	25												18											5
13	(Spain) Code Motorsports	37																		C					5
13	(Spain) Code Motorsports	41											20												5
13	(Spain) Code Motorsports	45																				22			5
13	(Spain) Code Motorsports	79																16	Ret						5
13	(Spain) Code Motorsports	88														23	17								5
Pos.	Team	Bike No.	THA (Thailand)	BRA (Brazil)	USA (United States)	SPA (Spain)	FRA (France)	CAT (Catalonia)	ITA (Italy)	HUN (Hungary)	CZE (Czech Republic)	NED (Netherlands)	GER (Germany)	GBR (United Kingdom)	ARA (Aragon)	RSM (San Marino)	AUT (Austria)	JPN (Japan)	INA (Indonesia)	AUS (Australia)	MAL (Malaysia)	QAT (Qatar)	POR (Portugal)	VAL (Valencian Community)	Pts
