= 2021 European Talent Cup =

Motorcycle racing championship

2021 European Talent Cup
Previous:	2020	Next:	2022
Support series: FIM CEV Moto3 Junior World Championship; FIM CEV Moto2 European Championship

The 2021 European Talent Cup was the fifth season of the European Talent Cup (motorcycle racing).

The season was marred by the death of 14 year old Hugo Millán, who was killed in an accident at the Aragón round.

== Calendar ==
The calendar was published in November 2020. The round at Barcelona made a return for 2021.

Round	Date	Circuit	Pole position	Fastest lap	Race winner
1	25 April	(Portugal) Estoril	(Spain) Álvaro Carpe	(Germany) Phillip Tonn	(Australia) Jacob Roulstone
1	25 April	(Portugal) Estoril	(Spain) Álvaro Carpe	(Spain) Xabi Zurutuza	(Spain) David Almansa
2	9 May	(Spain) Valencia	(Spain) Hugo Millán	(Spain) Joel Esteban	(Spain) Brian Uriarte
2	9 May	(Spain) Valencia	(Spain) Hugo Millán	(Spain) David Almansa	(Spain) Álvaro Carpe
3	13 June	(Spain) Barcelona	(Spain) Hugo Millán	(Spain) Adrián Cruces	(Spain) Xabi Zurutuza
4	4 July	(Portugal) Portimão	(Spain) Ángel Piqueras	(Spain) Adrián Cruces	(Spain) Xabi Zurutuza
5	25 July	(Spain) Aragón	(Spain) Xabi Zurutuza	(Spain) Alberto Ferrández	(Spain) Adrián Cruces
5	25 July	(Spain) Aragón	Race cancelled		
6	22 August	(Spain) Jerez	(Spain) Máximo Quiles	(Spain) Brian Uriarte	(Spain) Máximo Quiles
6	22 August	(Spain) Jerez	(Spain) Máximo Quiles	(Spain) Adrián Cruces	(Spain) Máximo Quiles
7	21 November	(Spain) Valencia	(Spain) Ángel Piqueras	(Spain) Máximo Quiles	(Spain) Máximo Quiles
7	21 November	(Spain) Valencia	(Spain) Ángel Piqueras	(Spain) Adrián Cruces	(Spain) Álvaro Carpe

== Entry list ==
Team	Constructor	No.	Rider	Rounds
(Spain) Fifty Motorsport	Honda	2	(Greece) Spyridon Fourthiotis	All
(Spain) Fifty Motorsport	Honda	21	(South Africa) Ruché Moodley	1–6
(Spain) Avatel–Cardoso Racing	Honda	3	(Greece) Vasilios Panteleakis	3, 5
(Spain) Avatel–Cardoso Racing	Honda	31	(Spain) Roberto García	1–6
(Poland) Wójcik Junior Racing Team	Honda	4	(Poland) Milan Pawelec	3–5
(Poland) Wójcik Junior Racing Team	Honda	5	(Poland) Oleg Pawelec	1–5
(Malaysia) Liqui Moly Intact SIC Racing Team	Honda	6	(Italy) Jordan Bartucca	7
(Malaysia) Liqui Moly Intact SIC Racing Team	Honda	13	(Malaysia) Hakim Danish	3–6
(Malaysia) Liqui Moly Intact SIC Racing Team	Honda	36	(Malaysia) Sharul Sharil	1–6
(Malaysia) Liqui Moly Intact SIC Racing Team	Honda	66	(Germany) Phillip Tonn	1–6
(Spain) Team Honda Laglisse	Honda	7	(Italy) Flavio Piccolo	1–2
(Spain) Team Honda Laglisse	Honda	28	(Spain) Máximo Quiles	All
(Spain) Team Honda Laglisse	Honda	42	(Australia) Cros Francis	1–3
(Spain) Team Honda Laglisse	Honda	89	(Italy) Demis Mihaila	1–5
(Sweden) Nordgren Racing	Honda	8	(Sweden) Emil Kollgren	5
(Spain) Cuna de Campeones	Honda	10	(Spain) Adrián Cruces	All
(Spain) Cuna de Campeones	Honda	44	(Spain) Hugo Millán	1–5
(Spain) Cuna de Campeones	Honda	67	(Republic of Ireland) Casey O'Gorman	1–4
(Spain) Cuna de Campeones	Honda	85	(Spain) Xabi Zurutuza	All
(Portugal) Miguel Oliveira Fan Club	Honda	11	(Portugal) Afonso Duarte	6
(Luxembourg) Leopard Impala Junior Team	Honda	12	(Australia) Jacob Roulstone	All
(Luxembourg) Leopard Impala Junior Team	Honda	71	(Qatar) Hamad Al Sahouti	3–7
(Luxembourg) Leopard Impala Junior Team	Honda	84	(France) Théo Gourdon	All
(Luxembourg) Leopard Impala Junior Team	Honda	87	(France) Alex Gourdon	All
(France) First Bike Academy	Honda	14	(France) Élie Rousselot	7
(France) First Bike Academy	Honda	77	(France) Léandro Quintans	1–3, 5
(Italy) AC Racing Team	Honda	16	(Italy) Alessandro Sciarretta	1–4
(Italy) AC Racing Team	Honda	34	(Italy) Cesare Tiezzi	6–7
(Italy) AC Racing Team	Honda	93	(Italy) Guido Pini	All
(Italy) Team MTA	Honda	17	(Canada) Torin Collins	All
(Spain) Team Estrella Galicia 0,0	Honda	18	(Spain) Ángel Piqueras	All
(Spain) Team Estrella Galicia 0,0	Honda	27	(Finland) Rico Salmela	All
(Spain) Team Estrella Galicia 0,0	Honda	51	(Spain) Brian Uriarte	All
(Spain) Team Estrella Galicia 0,0	Honda	94	(Uruguay) Facundo Llambías	7
(Spain) Team Estrella Galicia 0,0	Honda	95	(Argentina) Marco Morelli	1–5
(Spain) Aspar Junior Team	Honda	19	(Spain) Pol Solá	All
(Spain) Aspar Junior Team	Honda	47	(Italy) Edoardo Boggio	All
(Spain) Larresport	Honda	20	(Netherlands) Owen van Trigt	All
(Spain) Larresport	Honda	24	(France) Guillem Planques	All
(Spain) Finetwork Hawkers Junior Team	Honda	22	(Spain) David Almansa	1–5, 7
(Spain) Finetwork Hawkers Junior Team	Honda	25	(Spain) Gonzalo Pérez	All
(Spain) Finetwork Hawkers Junior Team	Honda	33	(Spain) Jesús Torres	6
(Spain) Artbox	Honda	26	(Spain) Pau Alsina	All
(Spain) Artbox	Honda	62	(Spain) Blai Trias	1–2, 4–7
(Netherlands) Ernst Dubbink Eveno Racing	Honda	29	(Netherlands) Maik Duin	7
(Spain) H43 Team Nobby	Honda	32	(Spain) Marcos Ludeña	1
(Spain) H43 Team Nobby	Honda	58	(Poland) Mateusz Pasiuk	3–4, 7
(Netherlands) Bracket Official	Honda	35	(Netherlands) Matthew Ruisbroeck	All
(Italy) Sic58 Squadra Corse	Honda	37	(United Kingdom) Corey Tinker	All
(Spain) Igax Team	Honda	43	(United Kingdom) Amanuel Brinton	All
(Spain) Igax Team	Honda	78	(Spain) Joel Esteban	All
(Poland) Motormania Kidzgp Team	Honda	52	(Poland) Jeremiasz Wojciechowski	1–5, 7
(Spain) MT–Foundation77	Honda	54	(Spain) Alberto Ferrández	1–6
(Spain) MT–Foundation77	Honda	83	(Spain) Álvaro Carpe	All
(France) Select Machines	Honda	56	(France) Marius Henry	2
(United Kingdom) KRP	Honda	57	(United Kingdom) Johnny Garness	1–4, 6–7
(United Kingdom) KRP	Honda	74	(United Kingdom) Carter Brown	1–4, 6–7
(Italy) SF Racing	Honda	69	(Italy) Alessandro Di Persio	7
(Spain) AGR Team	Honda	70	(United States) Kristian Daniel Jr.	All
(Portugal) Lousaestradas	Honda	73	(Portugal) Gonçalo Ribeiro	All
(Netherlands) Talent Team Oudleusen	Honda	75	(Netherlands) Justin Fokkert	1–3
(Spain) Ajevo Racing Team	Honda	80	(Spain) Marco García	7
(Spain) Fau55 Tey Racing	Honda	81	(Spain) César Parrilla	All
(Spain) Fau55 Tey Racing	Honda	91	(Japan) Kotaro Uchiumi	All
Équipe de France	Honda	88	(France) Clément Giabbani	All
(France) Mediasystem	Honda	99	(France) Rémy Sanjuan	7
Entry lists:

== Championship standings ==
Scoring system

Points were awarded to the top fifteen finishers. A rider had to finish the race to earn points.

Position	1st	2nd	3rd	4th	5th	6th	7th	8th	9th	10th	11th	12th	13th	14th	15th
Points	25	20	16	13	11	10	9	8	7	6	5	4	3	2	1

=== Riders' championship ===
Pos.	Rider	EST (Portugal)		VAL (Spain)		CAT (Spain)	POR (Portugal)	ARA (Spain)		JER (Spain)		VAL (Spain)		Points
1	(Spain) Máximo Quiles	5	4	4	Ret	2	4	3	C	1^{P}	1^{P}	1^{F}	6	171
2	(Spain) Adrián Cruces	2	5	6	2	Ret^{F}	3^{F}	1	C	4	4^{F}	4	4^{F}	154
3	(Spain) Xabi Zurutuza	11	6^{F}	3	4	1	1	2^{P}	C	5	Ret	3	8	149
4	(Spain) Brian Uriarte	9	Ret	1	Ret	5	2	4	C	2^{F}	2	5	2	147
5	(Spain) Álvaro Carpe	Ret^{P}	8^{P}	Ret	1	4	8	7	C	9	Ret	Ret	1	95
6	(Spain) Hugo Millán	8	3	2^{P}	3^{P}	3^{P}	6	DNS	C					86
7	(Spain) Ángel Piqueras	4	12	8	Ret	8	13^{P}	8	C	3	3	6^{P}	Ret^{P}	86
8	(Spain) Joel Esteban	3	11	5^{F}	7	6	11	Ret	C	10	5	9	11	85
9	(Australia) Jacob Roulstone	1	Ret	12	6	29	17	14	C	11	Ret	2	3	82
10	(Spain) Alberto Ferrández	Ret	2	10	9	7	5	6^{F}	C	8	Ret			71
11	(Spain) David Almansa	16	1	7	Ret^{F}	Ret	9	12	C			Ret	5	56
12	(Spain) Roberto García	Ret	Ret	Ret	5	Ret	14	5	C	7	6			43
13	(Finland) Rico Salmela	6	7	15	14	17	12	10	C	6	Ret	Ret	Ret	42
14	(Spain) Gonzalo Pérez	17	Ret	11	18	Ret	10	Ret	C	12	8	7	7	41
15	(Argentina) Marco Morelli	12	9	9	10	11	7	13	C					41
16	(Spain) César Parrilla	10	10	14	11	18	23	28	C	DNS	DNS	12	23	23
17	(Spain) Pau Alsina	25	25	17	13	13	15	Ret	C	DNS	7	14	14	20
18	(Italy) Guido Pini	23	21	22	24	20	Ret	Ret	C	13	10	11	10	20
19	(Germany) Phillip Tonn	Ret^{F}	13	13	8	26	Ret	17	C	Ret	11			19
20	(Uruguay) Facundo Llambías											8	9	15
21	(Italy) Edoardo Boggio	13	Ret	33	20	9	DNS	11	C	DNS	Ret	Ret	DNS	15
22	(Malaysia) Sharul Sharil	7	Ret	20	16	14	19	Ret	C	20	14			13
23	(France) Guillem Planques	15	14	16	12	10	16	18	C	DNQ	DNQ	DNQ	DNQ	13
24	(Poland) Milan Pawelec					12	DNQ	9	C					11
25	(United Kingdom) Amanuel Brinton	Ret	20	21	23	Ret	28	24	C	15	12	15	12	10
26	(Spain) Blai Trias	24	17	DNQ	DNQ		25	Ret	C	DNQ	DNQ	10	13	9
27	(South Africa) Ruché Moodley	27	Ret	30	22	Ret	24	19	C	Ret	9			7
28	(Spain) Pol Solá	14	15	19	17	Ret	22	22	C	19	19	13	16	6
29	(Qatar) Hamad Al Sahouti					DNQ	27	25	C	16	13	19	17	3
30	(Canada) Torin Collins	20	19	18	Ret	21	26	Ret	C	14	20	DNQ	DNQ	2
31	(France) Alex Gourdon	19	16	23	21	15	18	15	C	Ret	DNS	16	18	2
32	(United Kingdom) Johnny Garness	Ret	27	25	25	DNQ	DNQ			18	16	17	15	1
33	(Italy) Demis Mihaila	22	18	24	15	23	21	16	C					1
34	(Malaysia) Hakim Danish					19	Ret	20	C	DNS	15			1
	(Poland) Oleg Pawelec	18	23	Ret	19	16	20	DNS	C					0
	(Spain) Jesús Torres									17	18			0
	(United Kingdom) Corey Tinker	29	Ret	DNQ	DNQ	Ret	30	26	C	23	17	DNS	22	0
	(Spain) Marco García											18	19	0
	(France) Clément Giabbani	DNQ	DNQ	DNQ	DNQ	DNQ	DNQ	DNQ	DNQ	DNQ	DNQ	20	26	0
	(Poland) Jeremiasz Wojciechowski	DNQ	DNQ	DNQ	DNQ	DNQ	DNQ	DNQ	DNQ			21	20	0
	(Republic of Ireland) Casey O'Gorman	21	Ret	WD	WD	22	Ret							0
	(Japan) Kotaro Uchiumi	31	24	29	27	DNQ	Ret	21	C	DNQ	DNQ	DNQ	DNQ	0
	(France) Théo Gourdon	32	Ret	31	26	DNQ	32	23	C	21	Ret	23	24	0
	(Netherlands) Matthew Ruisbroek	DNQ	DNQ	DNQ	DNQ	DNQ	DNQ	DNQ	DNQ	DNQ	DNQ	22	21	0
	(Netherlands) Owen van Trigt	26	22	28	Ret	28	31	DNQ	DNQ	DNQ	DNQ	DNQ	DNQ	0
	(United Kingdom) Carter Brown	DNQ	DNQ	27	29	27	DNQ			22	Ret	DNQ	DNQ	0
	(Portugal) Gonçalo Ribeiro	28	26	32	30	24	Ret	27	C	DNQ	DNQ	DNQ	DNQ	0
	(Italy) Cesare Tiezzi									DNQ	DNQ	24	25	0
	(Italy) Alessandro Sciarretta	30	Ret	Ret	32	25	29							0
	(Netherlands) Maik Duin											25	27	0
	(Italy) Flavio Piccolo	DNQ	DNQ	26	31									0
	(Greece) Spyridon Fourthiotis	DNQ	DNQ	DNQ	DNQ	DNQ	DNQ	DNQ	DNQ	DNQ	DNQ	26	Ret	0
	(United States) Kristian Daniel Jr.	DNQ	DNQ	Ret	28	DNQ	DNQ	Ret	C	DNQ	DNQ	DNQ	DNQ	0
	(Netherlands) Justin Fokkert	DNQ	DNQ	DNQ	DNQ	Ret								0
	(Australia) Cros Francis	DNQ	DNQ	DNQ	DNQ	WD								
	(France) Léandro Quintans	DNQ	DNQ	DNQ	DNQ	DNQ		DNQ	DNQ					
	(Spain) Marcos Ludeña	DNQ	DNQ											
	(France) Marius Henry			DNQ	DNQ									
	(Poland) Mateusz Pasiuk					DNQ	DNQ					DNQ	DNQ	
	(Greece) Vasilios Panteleakis					DNQ		DNQ	DNQ					
	(Sweden) Emil Kollgren							DNQ	DNQ					
	(Portugal) Afonso Duarte									DNQ	DNQ			
	(Italy) Alessandro Di Persio											DNQ	DNQ	
	(France) Élie Rousselot											DNQ	DNQ	
	(Italy) Jordan Bartucca											DNQ	DNQ	
	(France) Rémy Sanjuan											DNQ	DNQ	
Pos	Rider	EST (Portugal)		VAL (Spain)		CAT (Spain)	POR (Portugal)	ARA (Spain)		JER (Spain)		VAL (Spain)		Points

Colour	Result
Gold	Winner
Silver	Second place
Bronze	Third place
Green	Points classification
Blue	Non-points classification
Blue	Non-classified finish (NC)
Purple	Retired, not classified (Ret)
Red	Did not qualify (DNQ)
Red	Did not pre-qualify (DNPQ)
Black	Disqualified (DSQ)
White	Did not start (DNS)
White	Withdrew (WD)
White	Race cancelled (C)
Blank	Did not practice (DNP)
Blank	Did not arrive (DNA)
Blank	Excluded (EX)

P – Pole position
F – Fastest lap
