= Zonta van den Goorbergh =

Dutch motorcycle racer (born 2005)

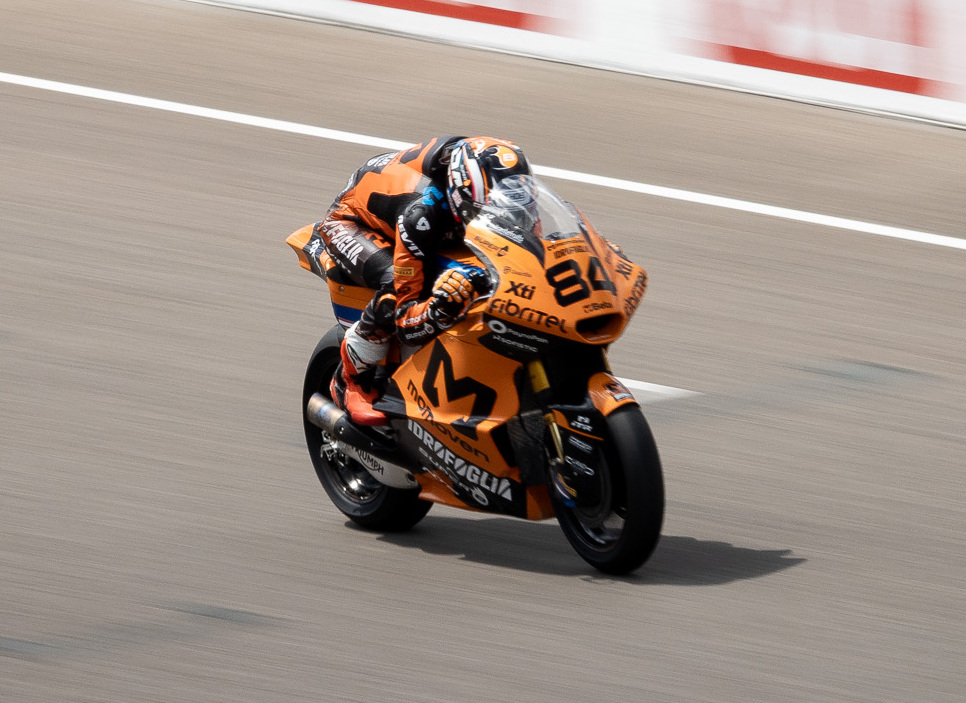
- van den Goorbergh at the 2026 German Grand Prix
- Nationality: Dutch
- Born: 1 December 2005 (age 20); Breda, Netherlands
- Current team: Momoven Idrofoglia RW Racing Team
- Bike number: 84
Motorcycle racing career statistics
Moto2 World Championship
Active years	2022–
Manufacturers	Kalex
2025 championship position	25th (19 pts)
Starts / Wins / Podiums / Poles / F. laps / Points; 99 / 0 / 0 / 0 / 0 / 81

Zonta van den Goorbergh (born 1 December 2005) is a Dutch Grand Prix motorcycle racer competing in the Moto2 World Championship for Momoven Idrofoglia RW Racing Team. His father, Jurgen van den Goorbergh is a former MotoGP racer.

== Career statistics ==
=== FIM European Talent Cup ===
==== Races by year ====
(key) (Races in bold indicate pole position; races in italics indicate fastest lap)

Year	Bike	1	2	3	4	5	6	7	8	9	10	11	Pos	Pts
2019	Honda	EST	EST	VAL	VAL	CAT	ARA; 7	ARA	JER	JER	ALB	VAL	25th	9
2020	Honda	EST; Ret	EST; 4	ALG; 8	**JER**; 2	**JER**; 5	**JER**; 1	**ARA**; 1	**ARA**; 1	**ARA**; 1	VAL; 5	VAL; Ret	2nd	163

=== Red Bull MotoGP Rookies Cup ===
==== Races by year ====
(key) (Races in bold indicate pole position, races in italics indicate fastest lap)

Year	1	2	3	4	5	6	7	8	9	10	11	12	Pos	Pts
2019	JER1; 13	JER2; 14	MUG; 15	ASS1; 9	ASS2; 10	SAC1; 14	SAC2; 13	RBR1; 6	RBR2; 6	MIS; 12	ARA1; 13	ARA2; 13	13th	54
2020	RBR1; 9	RBR2; 8	RBR3; 12	RBR4; 6	ARA1; 18	ARA2; 8	ARA3; 7	ARA4; 12	VAL1; 4	VAL2; 11	VAL3; 9	VAL4; 9	8th	82

=== FIM CEV Moto3 Junior World Championship ===
==== Races by year ====
(key) (Races in bold indicate pole position, races in italics indicate fastest lap)

Year	Bike	1	2	3	4	5	6	7	8	9	10	11	12	Pos	Pts
2021	Honda	EST; 22	VAL1; Ret	VAL2; 16	CAT1; 20	CAT2; 13	POR; 13	ARA; 11	JER1; 9	JER2; 13	RSM; 7	VAL3	VAL4	17th	30

=== Grand Prix motorcycle racing ===
==== By season ====
Season	Class	Motorcycle	Team	Race	Win	Podium	Pole	FLap	Pts	Plcd
2022	Moto2	Kalex	RW Racing GP	18	0	0	0	0	0	34th
2023	Moto2	Kalex	Fieten Olie Racing GP	20	0	0	0	0	17	23rd
2024	Moto2	Kalex	RW-Idrofoglia Racing GP	20	0	0	0	0	31	22nd
2025	Moto2	Kalex	RW-Idrofoglia Racing GP	22	0	0	0	0	19	25th
2026	Moto2	Kalex	Momoven Idrofoglia RW Racing Team	19	0	0	0	0	14*	25th*
Total				**99**	**0**	**0**	**0**	**0**	**81**	

==== By class ====
Class	Seasons	1st GP	1st pod	1st win	Race	Win	Podiums	Pole	FLap	Pts	WChmp
Moto2	2022–present	2022 Qatar			99	0	0	0	0	81	0
Total	2022–present				**99**	**0**	**0**	**0**	**0**	**81**	**0**

==== Races by year ====
(key) (Races in bold indicate pole position; races in italics indicate fastest lap)

Year	Class	Bike	1	2	3	4	5	6	7	8	9	10	11	12	13	14	15	16	17	18	19	20	21	22	Pos	Pts
2022	Moto2	Kalex	QAT; 24	INA; 23	ARG; Ret	AME; Ret	POR; Ret	SPA; 19	FRA; 17	ITA; 21	CAT; 20	GER; 18	NED; 18	GBR; Ret	AUT; 18	RSM; Ret	ARA; Ret	JPN; 16	THA; 17	AUS; WD	MAL	VAL; 21			34th	0
2023	Moto2	Kalex	POR; Ret	ARG; 18	AME; 17	SPA; 23	FRA; 20	ITA; Ret	GER; 18	NED; 20	GBR; 20	AUT; 22	CAT; 18	RSM; Ret	IND; 6	JPN; 9	INA; Ret	AUS; Ret ‡	THA; Ret	MAL; 18	QAT; 19	VAL; 18			23rd	17
2024	Moto2	Kalex	QAT; 13	POR; 19	AME; Ret	SPA; 13	FRA; 25	CAT; 11	ITA; 14	NED; Ret	GER; Ret	GBR; 11	AUT; 18	ARA; 14	RSM; 23	EMI; Ret	INA; 17	JPN; 5	AUS; Ret	THA; 19	MAL; Ret	SLD; Ret			22nd	31
2025	Moto2	Kalex	THA; 24	ARG; 17	AME; 13	QAT; 12	SPA; 20	FRA; 19	GBR; 13	ARA; 16	ITA; Ret	NED; 12	GER; 17	CZE; 20	AUT; 21	HUN; 13	CAT; 15	RSM; 17	JPN; Ret	INA; 15	AUS; 22	MAL; 21	POR; 16	VAL; 16	25th	19
2026	Moto2	Kalex	THA; Ret	BRA; 24	USA; 22	SPA; 17	FRA; 12	CAT; 19	ITA; 15	HUN; 13	CZE; 15	NED; 13	GER; 20	GBR; 24	ARA; 23	RSM; 19	AUT; 20	JPN; 15	INA; 15	AUS; C	MAL; 21	QAT; Ret	POR	VAL	25th*	14*

^{‡} Half points awarded as less than two thirds of the race distance (but at least three full laps) was completed.
* Season still in progress.
