= 2020 European Talent Cup =

Motor cycle race

2020 European Talent Cup
Previous:	2019	Next:	2021
Support series: FIM CEV Moto3 Junior World Championship; FIM CEV Moto2 European Championship

The 2020 European Talent Cup is the fourth season of the European Talent Cup.

== Race calendar and results ==
The calendar was published in November 2019; a revised schedule was released on 16 June 2020 due to delays caused by the COVID-19 pandemic.

Round	Date	Circuit	Pole position	Fastest lap	Winning rider	Winning team
1	7 July	(Portugal) Estoril	(Colombia) David Alonso	(Spain) Marco Tapia	(Colombia) David Alonso	Openbank Aspar Team
1	7 July	(Portugal) Estoril	(Colombia) David Alonso	(Spain) Ángel Piqueras	(Colombia) David Alonso	Openbank Aspar Team
2	13 July	(Portugal) Portimão	(Colombia) David Alonso	(Colombia) David Alonso	(Colombia) David Alonso	Openbank Aspar Team
3	29 August	(Spain) Jerez	(Netherlands) Zonta van den Goorbergh	(Argentina) Marco Morelli	(Colombia) David Alonso	Openbank Aspar Team
3	29 August	(Spain) Jerez	(Netherlands) Zonta van den Goorbergh	(Spain) Álvaro Carpe	(Argentina) Marco Morelli	Talent Team Estrella Galicia 0,0
4	30 August	(Spain) Jerez	(Netherlands) Zonta van den Goorbergh	(Spain) Ángel Piqueras	(Netherlands) Zonta van den Goorbergh	Super-B
5	3 October	(Spain) Aragón	(Netherlands) Zonta van den Goorbergh	(Spain) Álvaro Carpe	(Netherlands) Zonta van den Goorbergh	Super-B
5	3 October	(Spain) Aragón	(Netherlands) Zonta van den Goorbergh	(Spain) Iván Ortolá	(Netherlands) Zonta van den Goorbergh	Super-B
6	4 October	(Spain) Aragón	(Netherlands) Zonta van den Goorbergh	(Spain) Hugo Millán	(Netherlands) Zonta van den Goorbergh	Super-B
7	31 October	(Spain) Valencia	(Spain) Marcos Ruda	(Colombia) David Alonso	(Colombia) David Alonso	Openbank Aspar Team
8	1 November	(Spain) Valencia	(Spain) Marcos Ruda	(Spain) Roberto García	(Spain) Marcos Ruda	Team Honda Laglisse

== Entry list ==
The provisional entry list was announced in March 2020.

Team	Constructor	No.	Rider	Rounds
(Spain) Apex – Cardoso Racing	Honda	30	(Netherlands) Collin Veijer	All
(Spain) Apex – Cardoso Racing	Honda	41	(Spain) Roberto García	7–8
(Spain) Art Box	Honda	62	(Spain) Blai Trias	All
(Spain) Cuna De Campeones	Honda	10	(Spain) Adrián Cruces	All
(Spain) Cuna De Campeones	Honda	38	(Spain) Juan Rodríguez	All
(Spain) Cuna De Campeones	Honda	44	(Spain) Hugo Millán	2–8
(Spain) Cuna De Campeones	Honda	54	(Spain) Alberto Ferrández	All
(Spain) Cuna De Campeones	Honda	74	(Japan) Daijiro Sako	All
Equipe De France Filiere GP	Honda	39	(France) Bartholomé Perrin	All
(Spain) Fau55 Tey Racing	Honda	16	(Italy) Edoardo Liguori	7–8
(Spain) Fau55 Tey Racing	Honda	97	(Italy) Dodo Boggio	7–8
(Italy) FM Motorsport Racing Emotion	Honda	51	(Italy) Angelo Tagliarini	1–6
(Spain) H43Team Nobby Talasur-Blumaq	Honda	72	(Spain) Óscar Almonacil	1–4
(Spain) Hawkers Finetwork Aro Team	Honda	27	(Spain) Romeo Sandoval	All
(Spain) Hawkers Finetwork Aro Team	Honda	83	(Spain) Álvaro Carpe	All
(Spain) Jerez Andalucia Motor Talent	Honda	49	(Spain) Julio García	All
(Spain) Jerez Andalucia Motor Talent	Honda	93	(Spain) Sergio Bernal	1–6
(United Kingdom) KRP	Honda	87	(United Kingdom) Saffron Whatley	7–8
(Spain) Larresport Carré d'Or	Honda	24	(France) Guillem Planques	1, 3–8
(Luxembourg) Leopard Impala Junior Team	Honda	12	(Australia) Jacob Roulstone	All
(Luxembourg) Leopard Impala Junior Team	Honda	13	(Spain) Marco Tapia	All
(Luxembourg) Leopard Impala Junior Team	Honda	86	(Spain) Mario Mayor	1–6
(Germany) Liqui Moly Intact SIC Junior Team	Honda	36	(Malaysia) Sharul Ezwan	All
(Germany) Liqui Moly Intact SIC Junior Team	Honda	66	(Germany) Phillip Tonn	All
(Germany) Liqui Moly Intact SIC Junior Team	Honda	78	(United States) Damian Jigalov	All
(France) Mediasystem Team	Honda	61	(France) Ilan Peron	1, 5–6
(France) MHP Racing – Tech Solutions	Honda	3	(France) Mateo Pedeneau	1–2, 7–8
(France) MHP Racing – Tech Solutions	Honda	11	(France) Amaury Mizera	1–4
(France) MHP Racing – Tech Solutions	Honda	32	(Spain) David Real	5–8
(France) MHP Racing – Tech Solutions	Honda	47	(France) Leandro Quintans Sans	3–6
(United Kingdom) Microlise Creswell Racing	Honda	37	(Republic of Ireland) Casey O'Gorman	3–4, 7–8
(United Kingdom) Microlise Creswell Racing	Honda	57	(United Kingdom) Johnny Garness	7–8
(Spain) MRE Talent	Honda	31	(Spain) Roberto García	3–4
(Spain) MVK Dani Rivas Talent Team	Honda	2	(France) Marceau Lapierre	1–4
(Spain) MVK Dani Rivas Talent Team	Honda	21	(Spain) Dean Berta Viñales	1–2
(Spain) Openbank Aspar Team	Honda	48	(Spain) Iván Ortolá	All
(Spain) Openbank Aspar Team	Honda	80	(Colombia) David Alonso	all
(Spain) Reale Avintia MTA Junior Team	Honda	17	(Canada) Torin Collins	All
(Spain) Reale Avintia MTA Junior Team	Honda	55	(Switzerland) Noah Dettwiler	All
(France) Select Machines	Honda	56	(France) Marius Henry	5–8
(Italy) Sic58 Squadra Corse	Honda	29	(Australia) Harrison Voight	All
(Italy) Sic58 Squadra Corse	Honda	77	(Italy) Mattia Volpi	All
(Netherlands) Stichting Talent Team Oudleusen	Honda	75	(Netherlands) Justin Fokkert	1–2, 5–6
(Netherlands) Super-B	Honda	84	(Netherlands) Zonta van den Goorbergh	All
(Spain) Talent Team Estrella Galicia 0,0	Honda	18	(Spain) Ángel Piqueras	All
(Spain) Talent Team Estrella Galicia 0,0	Honda	70	(United States) Tyler Scott	All
(Spain) Talent Team Estrella Galicia 0,0	Honda	95	(Argentina) Marco Morelli	All
(Spain) Team Honda Laglisse	Honda	7	(Italy) Filippo Farioli	1–6
(Spain) Team Honda Laglisse	Honda	69	(Spain) Marcos Ruda	All
(Spain) Team Honda Laglisse	Honda	89	(Spain) Demis Mihaila	7–8
(Spain) Team Viñales	Honda	21	(Spain) Dean Berta Viñales	5–8
(Poland) Wójcik Racing Junior Team	Honda	4	(Poland) Milan Pawelec	All
(Poland) Wójcik Racing Junior Team	Honda	5	(Poland) Oleg Pawelec	All
(Poland) Wójcik Racing Junior Team	Honda	58	(Poland) Mateusz Pasiuk	1–6

== Championship' standings ==
Points were awarded to the top fifteen riders, provided the rider finished the race.

Position	1st	2nd	3rd	4th	5th	6th	7th	8th	9th	10th	11th	12th	13th	14th	15th
Points	25	20	16	13	11	10	9	8	7	6	5	4	3	2	1

Pos.	Rider	EST (Portugal)		ALG (Portugal)	JER (Spain)		JER (Spain)	ARA (Spain)		ARA (Spain)	VAL (Spain)	VAL (Spain)	Pts
1	(Colombia) David Alonso	1^{P}	1^{P}	1^{PF}	1	2	2	Ret	2	2	1^{F}	2	225
2	(Netherlands) Zonta van den Goorbergh	Ret	4	8	2^{P}	5^{P}	1^{P}	1^{P}	1^{P}	1^{P}	5	Ret	163
3	(Spain) Alberto Ferrández	3	3	2	5	3	7	7	7	4	3	5	146
4	(Spain) Iván Ortolá	2	9	6	4	7	3	4	3^{F}	3	Ret	3	136
5	(Spain) Marcos Ruda	Ret	6	7	6	9	5	11	12	13	4^{P}	1^{P}	97
6	(Spain) Ángel Piqueras	Ret	2^{F}	4	7	4	30^{F}	5	10	5	10	12	93
7	(Spain) Marco Tapia	6^{F}	7	5	15	11	12	6	9	11	2	7	91
8	(Australia) Harrison Voight	10	15	11	3	18	8	3	6	7	Ret	9	78
9	(Spain) Álvaro Carpe	8	Ret	10	10	Ret^{F}	9	2^{F}	13	8	6	8	76
10	(Argentina) Marco Morelli	4	13	3	Ret^{F}	1	Ret	Ret	4	Ret	Ret	13	73
11	(Spain) Juan Rodríguez	Ret	10	9	8	8	6	15	18	17	11	10	51
12	(Spain) Julio García	9	14	Ret	9	14	4	Ret	16	10	12	14	43
13	(Spain) Adrián Cruces	Ret	11	Ret	13	6	Ret	Ret	5	16	8	11	42
14	(Japan) Daijiro Sako	Ret	5	12	24	10	15	10	14	15	Ret	Ret	31
15	(Spain) David Real							16	8	9	Ret	4	28
16	(Netherlands) Collin Veijer	Ret	Ret	13	12	13	10	13	17	14	9	31	28
17	(Australia) Jacob Roulstone	11	16	23	18	16	16	9	11	18	7	15	27
18	(Spain) Hugo Millán			14	16	17	14	8	15	6^{F}	Ret	Ret	23
19	(Spain) Roberto García				11	15	11				Ret	6^{F}	21
20	(Italy) Filippo Farioli	5	12	15	17	20	DNS	14	Ret	19			18
21	(Italy) Mattia Volpi	7	8	18	20	23	DNS	17	25	25	17	25	17
22	(Spain) Romeo Sandoval	Ret	32	20	14	19	13	12	Ret	12	19	17	13
23	(Switzerland) Noah Dettwiler	12	18	16	19	12	DNS	Ret	23	22	14	20	10
24	(Germany) Phillip Tonn	14	19	17	25	Ret	19	20	20	Ret	13	Ret	5
25	(Spain) Dean Berta Viñales	13	17	19				Ret	DNS	21	15	19	4
26	(Netherlands) Justin Fokkert	15	23	34				WD	WD	WD			1
	(Spain) Óscar Almonacil	16	25	DNS	Ret	28	22						0
	(United States) Tyler Scott	20	27	28	29	33	23	Ret	22	26	16	Ret	0
	(France) Guillem Planques	17	20		27	24	DNS	19	24	Ret	DNS	16	0
	(Poland) Milan Pawelec	22	28	32	23	22	17	18	19	23	30	27	0
	(Canada) Torin Collins	18	Ret	29	31	32	27	23	26	29	20	Ret	0
	(Malaysia) Sharul Ezwan	Ret	22	26	21	26	18	Ret	21	20	24	22	0
	(Spain) Demis Mihaila										18	26	0
	(Republic of Ireland) Casey O'Gorman				Ret	21	DNS				26	18	0
	(Spain) Mario Mayor	19	Ret	21	22	29	25	WD	WD	WD			0
	(Spain) Blai Trias	21	26	Ret	Ret	25	20	21	Ret	24	22	23	0
	(France) Mateo Pedeneau	Ret	21	22							29	29	0
	(France) Bartholomé Perrin	Ret	24	24	26	27	21	DNS	DNS	33	23	21	0
	(United Kingdom) Johnny Garness										21	Ret	0
	(Poland) Oleg Pawelec	DNQ	DNQ	33	DNQ	DNQ	DNQ	22	27	27	25	24	0
	(France) Amaury Mizera	23	30	25	32	DNS	29						0
	(France) Marceau Lapierre	24	Ret	31	DNQ	DNQ	DNQ						0
	(Poland) Mateusz Pasiuk	25	31	DNQ	Ret	30	24	Ret	31	Ret			0
	(Italy) Angelo Tagliarini	DNQ	DNQ	DNQ	DNQ	DNQ	DNQ	24	30	32			0
	(France) Leandro Quintans Sans				30	Ret	26	25	28	28			0
	(France) Marius Henry							26	Ret	31	31	DNQ	0
	(United States) Damian Jigalov	DNQ	DNQ	27	28	31	28	Ret	29	30	27	30	0
	(Italy) Edoardo Liguori										28	28	0
	(Spain) Sergio Bernal	Ret	29	30	Ret	Ret	DNS	DNS	DNS	DNS			0
	(France) Ilan Peron	Ret	DNS					WD	WD	WD			0
	(Italy) Dodo Boggio										DNQ	DNQ	
	(United Kingdom) Saffron Whatley										DNQ	DNQ	
Pos.	Rider	EST (Portugal)		ALG (Portugal)	JER (Spain)		JER (Spain)	ARA (Spain)		ARA (Spain)	VAL (Spain)	VAL (Spain)	Points

Colour	Result
Gold	Winner
Silver	Second place
Bronze	Third place
Green	Points classification
Blue	Non-points classification
Blue	Non-classified finish (NC)
Purple	Retired, not classified (Ret)
Red	Did not qualify (DNQ)
Red	Did not pre-qualify (DNPQ)
Black	Disqualified (DSQ)
White	Did not start (DNS)
White	Withdrew (WD)
White	Race cancelled (C)
Blank	Did not practice (DNP)
Blank	Did not arrive (DNA)
Blank	Excluded (EX)

P – Pole position
F – Fastest lap
