= 2019 European Talent Cup =

2019 European Talent Cup
Previous:	2018	Next:	2020
Support series: FIM CEV Moto3 Junior World Championship; FIM CEV Moto2 European Championship

The 2019 European Talent Cup is the third season of the European Talent Cup.

== Race calendar and results ==
The provisional calendar was released in November 2018.

Round	Date	Circuit	Pole position	Fastest lap	Winning rider	Winning team
1	7 April	(Portugal) Estoril	(Spain) José Antonio Rueda	(Spain) Marcos Uriarte	(Spain) Iván Ortolá	Sama Global Angel Nieto Team
1	7 April	(Portugal) Estoril	(Spain) José Antonio Rueda	(Spain) Iván Ortolá	(Spain) Iván Ortolá	Sama Global Angel Nieto Team
2	28 April	(Spain) Valencia	(France) Lorenzo Fellon	(Germany) Dirk Geiger	(Spain) Izan Guevara	Cuna De Campeones
2	28 April	(Spain) Valencia	(Spain) Izan Guevara	(Spain) Daniel Muñoz	(Spain) Izan Guevara	Cuna De Campeones
3	9 June	(Spain) Catalunya	(Spain) Izan Guevara	(Spain) Álex Millán	(Spain) Izan Guevara	Cuna De Campeones
4	14 July	(Spain) Aragón	(Spain) Izan Guevara	(Spain) Izan Guevara	(Spain) Izan Guevara	Cuna De Campeones
4	14 July	(Spain) Aragón	(Spain) Juan Rodríguez	(France) Lorenzo Fellon	(Spain) Izan Guevara	Cuna De Campeones
5	29 September	(Spain) Jerez	(Brazil) Diogo Moreira	(Japan) Daijiro Sako	(Spain) Izan Guevara	Cuna De Campeones
5	29 September	(Spain) Jerez	(Brazil) Diogo Moreira	(Brazil) Diogo Moreira	(Brazil) Diogo Moreira	Talent Team Estrella Galicia 0,0
6	13 October	(Spain) Albacete	(Spain) Izan Guevara	(Japan) Daijiro Sako	(Spain) José Antonio Rueda	Talent Team Estrella Galicia 0,0
7	10 November	(Spain) Valencia	(Spain) Iván Ortolá	(Colombia) David Alonso	(Spain) Iván Ortolá	Angel Nieto Junior Team

== Entry list ==
Team	Constructor	No.	Rider	Rounds
(Italy) 2E Logistics Racing Division	Honda	51	(Italy) Angelo Tagliarini	7
(Spain) Academy GP	Honda	90	(Romania) Jacopo Hosciuc	7
(Spain) Alain Racing Team	Honda	56	(Spain) Alain González	3, 5–6
(Spain) Aro Racing	Honda	23	(Spain) Álex Millán	All
(United Arab Emirates) Bester Capital Dubai Junior Team	Honda	18	(United States) Rossi Moor	5–7
(United Arab Emirates) Bester Capital Dubai Junior Team	Honda	42	(Hungary) Soma Görbe	All
(United Arab Emirates) Bester Capital Dubai Junior Team	Honda	54	(Spain) Fermín Aldeguer	All
(United Arab Emirates) Bester Capital Dubai Junior Team	Honda	67	(Italy) Filippo Palazzi	All
(United Arab Emirates) Bester Capital Dubai Junior Team	Honda	73	(United States) Cody Kitchens	5–6
(Spain) Came Fundacion Andreas Perez 77	Honda	26	(Spain) Miguel Parra	3
(Spain) Cuna De Campeones	Honda	28	(Spain) Izan Guevara	1–6
(Spain) Cuna De Campeones	Honda	38	(Spain) Juan Rodríguez	All
(Spain) Cuna De Campeones	Honda	40	(Spain) Hugo Millan	7
(Spain) Cuna De Campeones	Honda	69	(Spain) Marcos Ruda	All
(Spain) Cuna De Campeones	Honda	74	(Japan) Daijiro Sako	All
(Germany) Dynavolt Intact SIC Junior Team	Honda	36	(Malaysia) Sharul Ezwan	7
(Germany) Dynavolt Intact SIC Junior Team	Honda	63	(Malaysia) Syarifuddin Azman	1–6
(Germany) Dynavolt Intact SIC Junior Team	Honda	99	(Malaysia) Harith Haziq	2–7
(Netherlands) Ernst Dubbink Eveno Racing	Honda	8	(Netherlands) Kas Beekmans	1–2, 4
(Spain) Blumaq HMA Racing	Honda	9	(Germany) Freddie Heinrich	1, 3
(Spain) Blumaq HMA Racing	Honda	15	(Spain) Julen Ávila	7
(Spain) Blumaq HMA Racing	Honda	26	(Spain) Miguel Parra	2
(Spain) Blumaq HMA Racing	Honda	37	(Republic of Ireland) Casey O'Gorman	7
(Spain) Blumaq HMA Racing	Honda	39	(Spain) Raúl Rodríguez	1–3, 5–7
(Spain) Blumaq HMA Racing	Honda	52	(Finland) Lenni Klemetti	4
(Spain) Blumaq HMA Racing	Honda	94	(Germany) Marvin Siebdrath	1–3
Equipe De France – Filière GP	Honda	17	(France) Marceau Lapierre	All
Equipe De France – Filière GP	Honda	22	(France) Clément Rougé	All
(Spain) F. Andreas Perez – Larresport Bradol; Larresport Bradol	Honda	15	(Spain) Julen Ávila	4–5
(Spain) F. Andreas Perez – Larresport Bradol; Larresport Bradol	Honda	48	(France) Gabin Planques	All
(Spain) F. Andreas Perez – Larresport Bradol; Larresport Bradol	Honda	68	(Italy) Edoardo Bertola	7
(Spain) F. Andreas Perez – Larresport Bradol; Larresport Bradol	Honda	78	(Spain) Daniel Mogeda	1–2, 5–7
(Spain) Fau55 El Señor De Laas Bolsas	Honda	16	(Czech Republic) Stepan Zuda	7
(Spain) Fau55 El Señor De Laas Bolsas	Honda	31	(Spain) Roberto García	1–4
GTRT Spain Torrecillas	Honda	14	(Spain) Carlos Torrecillas	All
(Switzerland) H43-Team Nobby-Carxpert-Blumaq	Honda	33	(Switzerland) Bryan-Kim Dupasquier	All
(Spain) Igax Team	Honda	50	(Argentina) Marco Morelli	7
(Spain) Igax Team	Honda	53	(Slovakia) Michal Búlik	All
(Spain) Ikono Laglisse Academy	Honda	2	(United States) Tyler Scott	All
(Spain) Ikono Laglisse Academy	Honda	8	(Spain) Adrián Huertas	7
(Spain) Ikono Laglisse Academy	Honda	25	(Spain) Luis Miguel Verdugo	1–2
(Spain) Ikono Laglisse Academy	Honda	86	(Spain) Mario Mayor	1–6
(Spain) Jerez Andalucia Motor Talent	Honda	49	(Spain) Julio García	All
(Spain) Jerez Andalucia Motor Talent	Honda	64	(Spain) David Muñoz	1–4, 6–7
(Germany) Kiefer Racing	Honda	6	(Germany) Dirk Geiger	All
(Spain) KPR Innovation Team	Honda	60	(Spain) Sergio Caro	3, 6
(United Kingdom) KRP	Honda	20	(United Kingdom) Jack Hart	5–7
(United Kingdom) KRP	Honda	70	(United Kingdom) Joshua Whatley	1–4
(Luxembourg) Leopard Impala Junior Team	Honda	3	(Italy) Pasquale Alfano	1–4
(Luxembourg) Leopard Impala Junior Team	Honda	4	(Portugal) Kiko Maria	All
(Luxembourg) Leopard Impala Junior Team	Honda	13	(Spain) Marco Tapia	2–7
(Luxembourg) Leopard Impala Junior Team	Honda	76	(Australia) Joel Kelso	5–7
(Spain) Maruga Racing Team	Honda	11	(Italy) Mattia Molino	2
(Spain) MRE Talent	Honda	31	(Spain) Roberto García	5–7
(Spain) MRE Talent	Honda	89	(Spain) Marcos Uriarte	1–3
(Spain) MVK Dani Rivas Talent Team	Honda	29	(Spain) Dean Berta Viñales	All
(United Kingdom) Nykos Racing for LDV45	Honda	45	(Belgium) Luca De Vleeschauwer	1–2
(Spain) Oneforex Cardoso School Racing	Honda	7	(Spain) Daniel Muñoz	All
(Spain) Redding – Pinamoto RS	Honda	9	(Germany) Freddie Heinrich	5–7
(Spain) Redding – Pinamoto RS	Honda	55	(Czech Republic) Matyáš Konečný	1–2, 4
(Spain) Sama Qatar Ángel Nieto Team	Honda	24	(Spain) Iván Ortolá	All
(Spain) Sama Qatar Ángel Nieto Team	Honda	80	(Colombia) David Alonso	All
(France) Select Machines	Honda	35	(France) Marius Henry	1–4, 7
(France) Select Machines	Honda	61	(France) Ilan Peron	All
(Italy) Sic58 Squadra Corse	Honda	72	(Italy) Mattia Falzone	All
(Italy) Sic58 Squadra Corse	Honda	77	(Italy) Mattia Volpi	All
(Kazakhstan) Sokol Race Team FMT	Honda	11	(Italy) Mattia Molino	3–5, 7
(Kazakhstan) Sokol Race Team FMT	Honda	15	(Spain) Julen Ávila	1–3
(Kazakhstan) Sokol Race Team FMT	Honda	19	(Austria) Andreas Kofler	1–5
(Kazakhstan) Sokol Race Team FMT	Honda	93	(Italy) Marco Gaggi	All
(Netherlands) Talent Team	Honda	75	(Netherlands) Justin Fokkert	All
(Spain) Talent Team Estrella Galicia 0,0	Honda	10	(Spain) Adrián Cruces	All
(Spain) Talent Team Estrella Galicia 0,0	Honda	92	(Brazil) Diogo Moreira	All
(Spain) Talent Team Estrella Galicia 0,0	Honda	95	(Spain) José Antonio Rueda	All
(Spain) Team Grupo Machado	Honda	41	(Spain) Eric Fernández	All
(Italy) Team MTA – Dinoil	Honda	19	(Austria) Andreas Kofler	6–7
(Italy) Team MTA – Dinoil	Honda	27	(Switzerland) Tommaso Cavadini	1–4
(Italy) Team MTA – Dinoil	Honda	44	(Switzerland) Noah Dettwiler	All
(France) Team RLD Racing	Honda	12	(France) Charles Aubrie	2–3, 7
(Netherlands) Team Superb	Honda	84	(Netherlands) Zonta van den Goorbergh	All
(France) TFC Racing	Honda	21	(France) Vincent Falcone	All
(Finland) Track Punk Racing	Honda	32	(Finland) Jenny Ruokolainen	1–6
(United Kingdom) Wilson Racing	Honda	20	(United Kingdom) Jack Hart	1–4
(United Kingdom) Wilson Racing	Honda	47	(United Kingdom) Fenton Seabright	1–5
(Italy) XCTECH	Honda	3	(Italy) Alessandro Sciarretta	7
(Italy) XCTECH	Honda	51	(Italy) Angelo Tagliarini	2, 4–6
(France) ZF Grand Prix School	Honda	5	(France) Lorenzo Fellon	2–7

== Championship' standings ==
Points were awarded to the top fifteen riders, provided the rider finished the race.

Position	1st	2nd	3rd	4th	5th	6th	7th	8th	9th	10th	11th	12th	13th	14th	15th
Points	25	20	16	13	11	10	9	8	7	6	5	4	3	2	1

Pos.	Rider	EST (Portugal)		VAL (Spain)		BAR (Spain)	ARA (Spain)		JER (Spain)		ALB (Spain)	VAL (Spain)	Pts
1	(Spain) Izan Guevara	10	8	1	1^{P}	1^{P}	1^{PF}	1	1	3	10^{P}		186
2	(Spain) Iván Ortolá	1	1^{F}	12	Ret	14	5	7	7	8	6	1^{P}	128
3	(Spain) Fermín Aldeguer	23	4	2	9	2	6	5	8	12	4	2	126
4	(Spain) José Antonio Rueda	Ret^{P}	7^{P}	8	6	5	11	2	4	5	1	6	122
5	(Colombia) David Alonso	6	3	DNQ	DNQ	7	2	3	5	2	8	Ret^{F}	110
6	(Brazil) Diogo Moreira	14	6	6	8	19	18	15	2^{P}	1^{PF}	2	Ret	96
7	(Japan) Daijiro Sako	16	14	4	Ret	3	17	4	3^{F}	7	5^{F}	8	88
8	(Spain) Adrián Cruces	Ret	Ret	Ret	4	8	9	6	6	9	3	3	87
9	(Spain) Marcos Ruda	9	2	11	10	Ret	Ret	10	Ret	10	9	4	70
10	(Germany) Dirk Geiger	4	12	3^{F}	3	10	Ret	23	16	20	13	18	58
11	(Spain) David Muñoz	3	13	5	2	DNS	Ret	Ret			DNS	11	55
12	(Spain) Álex Millán	Ret	9	15	27	4^{F}	3	Ret	Ret	4	11	Ret	55
13	(France) Lorenzo Fellon			10^{P}	5	6	Ret	Ret^{F}	10	6	15	Ret	44
14	(United Kingdom) Fenton Seabright	2	10	14	11	15	DNQ	DNQ	14	13			39
15	(France) Clément Rougé	Ret	Ret	9	15	9	4	9	19	25	23	16	35
16	(Malaysia) Syarifuddin Azman	5	11	DNQ	DNQ	30	12	11	13	16	14		30
17	(Australia) Joel Kelso								12	11	7	5	29
18	(Spain) Juan Rodríguez	Ret	Ret	13	14	13	Ret	8^{P}	Ret	14	12	15	23
19	(Spain) Daniel Muñoz	15	25	20	7^{F}	11	DNQ	DNQ	15	Ret	Ret	10	22
20	(France) Vincent Falcone	8	5	Ret	DNS	DNQ	23	27	DNQ	DNQ	DNS	23	19
21	(Italy) Mattia Volpi	Ret	Ret	DNQ	DNQ	27	10	16	9	15	Ret	13	17
22	(Spain) Marcos Uriarte	Ret^{F}	28	7	16	12							13
23	(Spain) Roberto García	DNQ	DNQ	Ret	Ret	28	13	Ret	24	18	19	7	12
24	(United Kingdom) Joshua Whatley	Ret	17	Ret	Ret	18	8	12					12
25	(Italy) Filippo Palazzi	7	Ret	30	29	24	DNQ	DNQ	20	29	17	Ret	9
26	(Netherlands) Zonta van den Goorbergh	Ret	16	17	18	23	7	Ret	Ret	17	25	Ret	9
27	(Spain) Marco Tapia			24	12	Ret	DNQ	DNQ	18	22	DNS	12	8
28	(Spain) Adrián Huertas											9	7
29	(Italy) Pasquale Alfano	13	31	16	13	Ret	DNS	DNS					6
30	(Spain) Luis Miguel Verdugo	11	22	33	22								5
31	(United Kingdom) Jack Hart	DNQ	DNQ	Ret	Ret	33	21	25	11	Ret	24	DNQ	5
32	(Spain) Julen Ávila	12	19	28	23	34	24	19	27	Ret		DNQ	4
33	(France) Gabin Planques	Ret	27	DNQ	DNQ	31	22	14	17	27	21	14	4
34	(Spain) Eric Fernández	Ret	18	23	21	20	Ret	13	Ret	23	18	Ret	3
35	(Spain) Julio García	Ret	20	22	24	32	14	21	21	28	DNS	22	2
36	(Switzerland) Noah Dettwiler	19	15	DNQ	DNQ	DNQ	15	17	22	24	Ret	21	2
	(Spain) Carlos Torrecillas	18	29	18	17	16	Ret	20	Ret	19	16	24	0
	(Spain) Mario Mayor	Ret	23	DNQ	DNQ	21	16	18	23	26	DNS		0
	(Spain) Dean Berta Viñales	17	26	DNQ	DNQ	DNQ	29	28	Ret	Ret	20	27	0
	(Hungary) Soma Görbe	DNQ	DNQ	DNQ	DNQ	17	27	26	28	Ret	DNQ	DNQ	0
	(Argentina) Marco Morelli											17	0
	(Spain) Miguel Parra			19	28	28							0
	(Belgium) Luca De Vleeschauwer	DNQ	DNQ	21	19								0
	(Austria) Andreas Kofler	Ret	21	31	30	Ret	19	Ret	Ret	31	Ret	26	0
	(Spain) Hugo Millán											19	0
	(Portugal) Kiko Maria	20	24	29	26	DNQ	28	29	DNQ	DNQ	29	30	0
	(Italy) Mattia Falzone	DNQ	DNQ	25	20	26	20	22	Ret	21	22	28	0
	(Spain) Daniel Mogeda	22	25	DNQ	DNQ				DNQ	DNQ	DNQ	20	0
	(Italy) Marco Gaggi	21	30	DNQ	DNQ	DNQ	25	24	26	30	DNQ	DNQ	0
	(Slovakia) Michal Búlik	Ret	Ret	26	25	22	Ret	DNS	Ret	Ret	DNQ	29	0
	(United States) Rossi Moor								25	Ret	27	31	0
	(Romania) Jacopo Hosciuc											25	0
	(Switzerland) Tommaso Cavadini	DNQ	DNQ	DNQ	DNQ	DNQ	26	30					0
	(France) Marceau Lapierre	DNQ	DNQ	DNQ	DNQ	DNQ	DNQ	DNQ	DNQ	DNQ	26	DNQ	0
	(Netherlands) Kas Beekmans	DNQ	DNQ	27	32		Ret	Ret					0
	(Switzerland) Bryan-kim Dupasquier	DNQ	DNQ	DNQ	DNQ	DNQ	DNQ	DNQ	DNQ	DNQ	28	DNQ	0
	(Spain) Sergio Caro					29					Ret		0
	(Germany) Marvin Siebdrath	DNQ	DNQ	32	31	DNQ							0
	(Germany) Freddie Heinrich	DNQ	DNQ			DNQ			DNQ	DNQ	DNQ	DNQ	
	(France) Ilan Peron	DNQ	DNQ	DNQ	DNQ	DNQ	DNQ	DNQ	DNQ	DNQ	DNQ	DNQ	
	(Finland) Jenny Ruokolainen	DNQ	DNQ	DNQ	DNQ	DNQ	DNQ	DNQ	DNQ	DNQ	DNQ		
	(Netherlands) Justin Fokkert	DNQ	DNQ	DNQ	DNQ	DNQ	DNQ	DNQ	DNQ	DNQ	DNQ	DNQ	
	(France) Marius Henry	DNQ	DNQ	DNQ	DNQ	DNQ	DNQ	DNQ				DNQ	
	(Czech Republic) Matyáš Konečný	DNQ	DNQ	DNQ	DNQ		DNQ	DNQ					
	(Spain) Raúl Rodríguez	DNQ	DNQ	DNQ	DNQ	DNQ			DNQ	DNQ	DNQ	DNQ	
	(United States) Tyler Scott	DNQ	DNQ	DNQ	DNQ	DNQ	DNQ	DNQ	DNQ	DNQ	DNQ	DNQ	
	(Italy) Angelo Tagliarini			DNQ	DNQ		DNQ	DNQ	DNQ	DNQ	DNQ	DNQ	
	(France) Charles Aubrie			DNQ	DNQ	DNQ						DNQ	
	(Malaysia) Harith Haziq			DNQ	DNQ	DNQ	DNQ	DNQ	DNQ	DNQ	DNQ	DNQ	
	(Italy) Mattia Molino			DNQ	DNQ	DNQ	DNQ	DNQ	DNQ	DNQ		DNQ	
	(Spain) Alain González					DNQ			DNQ	DNQ	DNQ		
	(Finland) Lenni Klemetti						DNQ	DNQ					
	(United States) Cody Kitchens								DNQ	DNQ	DNQ		
	(Italy) Alessandro Sciarretta											DNQ	
	(Republic of Ireland) Casey O'Gorman											DNQ	
	(Italy) Edoardo Bertola											DNQ	
	(Malaysia) Sharul Ezwan											DNQ	
	(Czech Republic) Stepan Zuda											DNQ	
Pos.	Rider	EST (Portugal)		VAL (Spain)		BAR (Spain)	ARA (Spain)		JER (Spain)		ALB (Spain)	VAL (Spain)	Points

Colour	Result
Gold	Winner
Silver	Second place
Bronze	Third place
Green	Points classification
Blue	Non-points classification
Blue	Non-classified finish (NC)
Purple	Retired, not classified (Ret)
Red	Did not qualify (DNQ)
Red	Did not pre-qualify (DNPQ)
Black	Disqualified (DSQ)
White	Did not start (DNS)
White	Withdrew (WD)
White	Race cancelled (C)
Blank	Did not practice (DNP)
Blank	Did not arrive (DNA)
Blank	Excluded (EX)

P – Pole position
F – Fastest lap
