= Marco Morelli =

Argentine motorcycle racer (born 2007)

- Nationality: Argentine
- Born: 2 July 2007 (age 19); Barcelona, Spain
Motorcycle racing career statistics
Moto3 World Championship
Active years	2025–
Manufacturers	KTM (2025–); Honda (2025)
2025 championship position	24th (18 pts)
Starts / Wins / Podiums / Poles / F. laps / Points; 27 / 0 / 3 / 0 / 2 / 159

Marco Morelli (born 2 July 2007) is an Argentine Grand Prix motorcycle racer for CFMoto Aspar Team in the 2026 Moto3 World Championship.

== Career ==
=== Early career (2019–2025) ===
Morelli made his European Talent Cup debut in the final round of the 2019 season and contested the series full time the following year, taking his first win at Circuito de Jerez. 2024 was his best season in the Talent Cup category as he came runner-up to the 2024 European Talent Cup, and won two races in Thruxton in the 2024 British Talent Cup as a wildcard.

Morelli missed out on racing in 2022 but returned the following year. He competed in the Red Bull MotoGP Rookies Cup for three full seasons, from 2023 to 2025, and took two wins (in 2024) throughout the course of his tenure at Jerez and Assen.

For 2025, Morelli did a dual campaign in the FIM JuniorGP World Championship. His campaign perked up in the halfway point of the season, taking his first podium at Aragón, and winning his first race a round later at Misano. Morelli won the final three races of the season – Barcelona and Ricardo Tormo – and finished runner-up to the title.

=== Grand Prix Motorcycle Racing (2025–) ===
==== Moto3 World Championship (2025–) ====
Morelli was called up to replaced the injured Ruché Moodley at the 2025 Czech Republic motorcycle Grand Prix for Denssi Racing – Boé, making his Moto3 World Championship debut, where he came 13th. From the 17th round and onwards, he was a regular driver at Gryd – MLav Racing. He came a highest of 11th in the penultimate round at the Portuguese motorcycle Grand Prix.

Morelli partnered Spaniard Máximo Quiles to make his full-time debut in the 2026 Moto3 World Championship with CFMoto Aspar Team. Morelli scored a maiden podium in the second round at the Brazilian motorcycle Grand Prix. He achieved podiums at Jerez, Assen and Aragón.

== Personal life ==
Morelli was born in Barcelona, Spain to an Argentinian father of Italian descent and a mother from Madrid, Spain.

== Career statistics ==
=== European Talent Cup ===
==== Races by year ====
(key) (Races in bold indicate pole position; races in italics indicate fastest lap)

Year	Bike	1	2	3	4	5	6	7	8	9	10	11	12	Pos	Pts
2019	Honda	EST	EST	VAL	VAL	CAT	ARA	ARA	JER	JER	ALB	VAL; 17		NC	0
2020	Honda	EST; 4	EST; 13	ALG; 3	JER; Ret	JER; 1	JER; Ret	ARA; Ret	ARA; 4	ARA; Ret	VAL; Ret	VAL; 13		10th	73
2021	Honda	EST; 12	EST; 9	VAL; 9	VAL; 10	CAT; 11	POR; 7	ARA; 13	ARA; C	JER	JER	VAL	VAL	15th	41
2023	Honda	EST	EST	VAL	VAL	JER	JER	ALG	BAR; 5	ARA; 9	ARA; Ret	VAL		22nd	18
2024	Honda	**MIS**; 2	**MIS**; 1	EST; 2	EST; Ret	**BAR**; 1	ALG; 7	JER; 6	JER; 5	ARA; 2	ARA; 3	EST; 5		2nd	167

=== FIM CEV Moto3 Junior World Championship ===
==== Races by year ====
(key) (Races in bold indicate pole position, races in italics indicate fastest lap)

Year	Bike	1	2	3	4	5	6	7	8	9	10	11	12	Pos	Pts
2021	KTM	EST	VAL1	VAL2	CAT1	CAT2	POR	ARA	JER1	JER2	RSM	VAL3; 16	VAL4; 13	34th	3

=== Red Bull MotoGP Rookies Cup ===
==== Races by year ====
(key) (Races in bold indicate pole position; races in italics indicate fastest lap)

Year	Bike	1		2		3		4		5		6		7		Pos	Pts
Year	Bike	R1	R2	R1	R2	R1	R2	R1	R2	R1	R2	R1	R2	R1	R2	Pos	Pts
2023	KTM	ALG; 11	ALG; 7	JER; 11	JER; 4	**LMS**; 13	**LMS**; 4	MUG; 3	MUG; 12	ASS; 16	ASS; 8	RBR; 10	RBR; 10	MIS; Ret	MIS; 13	10th	91
2024	KTM	JER; 1	JER; 6	LMS; Ret	LMS; 6	MUG; Ret	MUG; 11	ASS; 14	ASS; 1	RBR; 2	RBR; 12	ARA; 19	ARA; 14	MIS; 10	MIS; 12	7th	113
2025	KTM	JER; 5	JER; 4	LMS; 9	LMS; 3	ARA; 16	ARA; 12	MUG; 5	MUG; 4	SAC; Ret	SAC; 17	RBR; 7	RBR; 3	MIS; 2	MIS; 3	5th	136

=== FIM JuniorGP World Championship ===
==== Races by year ====
(key) (Races in bold indicate pole position) (Races in italics indicate fastest lap)

Year	Bike	1	2	3	4	5	6	7	8	9	10	11	12	Pos	Pts
2025	Honda	EST; 7	JER1; 8	JER2; 13	MAG; 5	ARA1; 9	ARA2; 3	MIS1; 1	MIS2; 3	BAR1; 4	BAR2; 1	**VAL1**; 1	**VAL2**; 1	2nd	183

=== Grand Prix motorcycle racing ===
==== By season ====
Season	Class	Motorcycle	Team	Race	Win	Podium	Pole	FLap	Pts	Plcd
2025	Moto3	KTM	Denssi Racing – Boé	1	0	0	0	0	18	24th
2025	Moto3	Honda	Gryd – MLav Racing	7	0	0	0	0	18	24th
2026	Moto3	KTM	CFMoto Aspar Team	19	0	3	0	2	141*	6th*
Total				**27**	**0**	**3**	**0**	**2**	**159**	

==== By class ====
Class	Seasons	1st GP	1st pod	1st win	Race	Win	Podiums	Pole	FLap	Pts	WChmp
Moto3	2025-present	2025 Czech Republic	2026 Brazil		27	0	3	0	2	159	0
Total	2025-present				**27**	**0**	**3**	**0**	**2**	**159**	**0**

==== Races by year ====
(key) (Races in bold indicate pole position; races in italics indicate fastest lap)

Year	Class	Bike	1	2	3	4	5	6	7	8	9	10	11	12	13	14	15	16	17	18	19	20	21	22	Pos	Pts
2025	Moto3	KTM	THA	ARG	AME	QAT	SPA	FRA	GBR	ARA	ITA	NED	GER	CZE; 13	AUT	HUN									24th	18
2025	Moto3	Honda															CAT; 17	RSM	JPN; 17	INA; 14	AUS; 18	MAL; 12	POR; 11	VAL; 12	24th	18
2026	Moto3	KTM	THA; 8	BRA; 2	USA; 12	SPA; 4	FRA; 13	CAT; 5	ITA; 13	HUN; 7	CZE; 7	NED; 3	GER; 4	GBR; 16	ARA; 3	RSM; 9	AUT; 8	JPN; 18	INA; 18	AUS; C	MAL; 20	QAT; 15	POR	VAL	7th*	141*

* Season still in progress.
