= O'Gorman High School =

O'Gorman High School may refer to:

- O'Gorman High School (Timmins)
- O'Gorman Catholic High School (Sioux Falls, South Dakota)

== See also ==
- O'Gorman, a surname
