= Casey O'Gorman (motorcyclist) =

Irish motorcycle racer (born 2007)

- O'Gorman at the 2026 San Marino Grand Prix
- Nationality: Irish
- Born: 7 August 2007 (age 19); Portlaoise, Ireland
- Current team: Sic58 Squadra Corse
- Bike number: 67
Motorcycle racing career statistics
Moto3 World Championship
Active years	2025–
Manufacturers	Honda (2025–); KTM (2025)
2025 championship position	25th (16 pts)
Starts / Wins / Podiums / Poles / F. laps / Points; 23 / 0 / 0 / 0 / 1 / 82

Casey James O'Gorman (born 7 August 2007) is an Irish Grand Prix motorcycle racer who competes in the Moto3 World Championship for Sic58 Squadra Corse.

O'Gorman won the British Talent Cup in 2021. He made his Grand Prix debut as a replacement for Luca Lunetta at the Austrian and Hungarian Grands Prix.

== Career ==
=== Early career ===
O'Gorman was born in Portlaoise, Ireland. He stood out in British small-bike championships during his early career and later competed in Spanish development program Cuna de Campeones. He made his first appearance in the European Talent Cup in 2019 at the age of 12, but failed to qualify for the Sunday race. In 2020, he returned for four races in the same category, narrowly missing out on points in the final round at Valencia. For 2021, O'Gorman participated in four rounds of the 2021 European Talent Cup, with Cuna de Campeones, while also competing in the Honda British Talent Cup, a series he would go on to win.

As a result of his performances, O'Gorman was selected to compete in the 2022 Red Bull MotoGP Rookies Cup. He secured two podium finishes in the opening races and concluded the season eighth overall. O'Gorman also participated in the 2022 European Talent Cup season, this time as a full-time rider, where he achieved four podiums and two wins, placing him third in the final standings.

For 2023, O'Gorman would take part in both categories again. He clinched two consecutive second places as best results in the European Talent Cup, but missed out on several races due to injury. He replicated his 2022 performance in the 2023 Red Bull MotoGP Rookies Cup, finishing in the podium twice and eighth in the final standings. O'Gorman also made his British Supersport Championship debut in that same year. Ultimately, he entered the last two rounds of the JuniorGP World Championship with Team Estrella Galicia at Motorland Aragón and Valencia, and finished ninth in his debut race.

O'Gorman stepped up to the FIM JuniorGP World Championship with Team Estrella Galicia 0,0 for 2024, where he achieved two podiums and several top ten finishes. These results put him 11th in the final standings. He remained in the same team for 2025. In the first six races of the calendar, O'Gorman clinched three podium finishes and sat third in the standings.

=== Moto3 World Championship ===
==== Sic58 Squadra Corse (2025–) ====
On 7 August 2025, Sic58 Squadra Corse announced O'Gorman would be making his Grand Prix debut as a replacement for injured Luca Lunetta at the Austrian and Hungarian Grands Prix. He finished 18th in his debut race and 13th in his second, claiming his first World Championship points. Two months later, the team announced O'Gorman as one of their riders for the 2026 and 2027 Moto3 World Championship seasons.

Later in the season, O'Gorman was drafted by Intact GP to replace injured David Muñoz for the final two rounds of the year, at the Portuguese and Valencian Grands Prix, making his second replacement appearance of the season. He finished in sixth place at Portimão in his first race aboard a KTM, and ultimately 13th in the season finale at Valencia.

== Career statistics ==
=== British Talent Cup ===
==== Races by year ====
(key) (Races in bold indicate pole position; races in italics indicate fastest lap)

Year	Bike	1		2		3		4		5			6		7		8		9		Pos	Pts
Year	Bike	R1	R2	R1	R2	R1	R2	R1	R2	R1	R2	R3	R1	R2	R1	R2	R1	R2	R1	R2	Pos	Pts
2020	Honda	**DON**; 1	**DON**; Ret	SNE; Ret	SNE; 1	SIL; Ret	SIL; 1	**DON**; 4	DON; 3	BRH; Ret	BRH; Ret										5th	104
2021	Honda	OUL; 1	**OUL**; 1	KNO	KNO	BRH	BRH	THR		DON; 2	DON; 1	DON; 1	SIL; 2	SIL; 1	SNE; 1	SNE; 2	SIL; Ret	SIL; 4	**DON**; 1	**DON**; 1	1st	273

=== European Talent Cup ===
==== Races by year ====
(key) (Races in bold indicate pole position; races in italics indicate fastest lap)

Year	Bike	1	2	3	4	5	6	7	8	9	10	11	12	Pos	Pts
2019	Honda	EST	EST	VAL	VAL	CAT	ARA	ARA	JER	JER	ALB	VAL; DNQ		NC	0
2020	Honda	EST	EST	ALG	JER; Ret	JER; 21	JER; DNS	ARA	ARA	ARA	VAL; 26	VAL; 18		NC	0
2021	Honda	EST; 21	EST; Ret	VAL; WD	VAL; WD	BAR; 22	ALG; Ret	ARA	ARA	JER	JER	VAL	VAL	NC	0
2022	Honda	EST; 4	EST; Ret	VAL; 5	VAL; 5	BAR; Ret	JER; Ret	JER; 3	ALG; 3	ARA; 4	ARA; 1	**VAL**; 1		3rd	130
2023	Honda	EST; DNS	EST; DNS	VAL; Ret	VAL; DNS	JER; 7	JER; Ret	ALG; 2	BAR; 2	ARA	ARA	VAL		13th	49

=== Red Bull MotoGP Rookies Cup ===
==== Races by year ====
(key) (Races in bold indicate pole position; races in italics indicate fastest lap)

Year	Bike	1		2		3		4		5		6		7		Pos	Pts
Year	Bike	R1	R2	R1	R2	R1	R2	R1	R2	R1	R2	R1	R2	R1	R2	Pos	Pts
2022	KTM	ALG; 2	ALG; 3	JER; 5	JER; 5	MUG; Ret	MUG; 22	SAC; 6	SAC; 10	RBR; Ret	RBR; 10	ARA; 7	ARA; 7	VAL; 5	VAL; Ret	8th	109
2023	KTM	ALG; 4	ALG; 4	JER; 10	JER; 7	LMS; Ret	LMS; Ret	MUG; 2	MUG; Ret	ASS; 3	ASS; 4	RBR; 9	RBR; Ret	MIS	MIS	8th	97

=== FIM JuniorGP World Championship ===
==== Races by year ====
(key) (Races in bold indicate pole position; races in italics indicate fastest lap)

Year	Bike	1	2	3	4	5	6	7	8	9	10	11	12	Pos	Pts
2023	Honda	EST	VAL1	VAL2	JER1	JER2	POR1	POR2	CAT1	CAT2	ARA; 9	VAL1; Ret	VAL2; 14	23th	9
2024	Honda	MIS1; 4	MIS2; 5	EST; Ret	CAT1; Ret	CAT2; 15	ALG1; 3	ALG2; 6	JER1; 7	JER2; Ret	ARA; 3	EST1; Ret	EST2; Ret	11th	76
2025	Honda	EST; Ret	JER1; 6	JER2; 6	MAG; 2	ARA1; 2	ARA2; 2	MIS1; 9	MIS2; 7	CAT1; 5	CAT2; 4	VAL1; Ret	VAL2; 4	6th	133

=== Grand Prix motorcycle racing ===
==== By season ====
Season	Class	Motorcycle	Team	Race	Win	Podium	Pole	FLap	Pts	Plcd
2025	Moto3	Honda	Sic58 Squadra Corse	2	0	0	0	0	16	25th
2025	Moto3	KTM	Liqui Moly Dynavolt Intact GP	2	0	0	0	0	16	25th
2026	Moto3	Honda	Sic58 Squadra Corse	19	0	0	0	1	66*	16th*
Total				**23**	**0**	**0**	**0**	**1**	**82**	

==== By class ====
Class	Seasons	1st GP	1st pod	1st win	Race	Win	Podiums	Pole	FLap	Pts	WChmp
Moto3	2025–present	2025 Austria			23	0	0	0	1	82	0
Total	2025–present				**23**	**0**	**0**	**0**	**1**	**82**	**0**

==== Races by year ====
(key) (Races in bold indicate pole position; races in italics indicate fastest lap)

Year	Class	Bike	1	2	3	4	5	6	7	8	9	10	11	12	13	14	15	16	17	18	19	20	21	22	Pos	Pts
2025	Moto3	Honda	THA	ARG	AME	QAT	SPA	FRA	GBR	ARA	ITA	NED	GER	CZE	AUT; 18	HUN; 13	CAT	RSM	JPN	INA	AUS	MAL			25th	16
2025	Moto3	KTM																					POR; 6	VAL; 13	25th	16
2026	Moto3	Honda	THA; 11	BRA; 9	USA; Ret	SPA; 12	FRA; Ret	CAT; 9	ITA; Ret	HUN; 9	CZE; Ret	NED; 10	GER; Ret	GBR; 12	ARA; 7	RSM; 10	AUT; 6	JPN; 15	INA; Ret	AUS; C	MAL; 16	QAT; 18	POR	VAL	18th*	66*

* Season still in progress.
