= Pau Alsina =

Spanish motorcycle racer (2008–2025)

- Nationality: Spanish
- Born: 22 January 2008; Sallent, Spain
- Died: 21 July 2025 (aged 17); Zaragoza, Spain

Pau Alsina (22 January 2008 – 21 July 2025) was a Spanish motorcycle racer. He died from injuries sustained in an accident at MotorLand Aragón. He was competing in the 2025 FIM JuniorGP World Championship at the time of his death.

== Career ==
Born in Sallent de Llobregat (Barcelona) in January 2008, Alsina started riding motorcycles when he was just three years old. At the age of six, Alsina was involved in motocross and also in supermoto and dirt-track events. At the age of 11, he competed in the Spanish Moto4 Championship and later in the European Motorcycle Championship, eventually signing for the Estrella Galicia team. Alsina combined his studies with the world of competition. At the age of 16, Alsina joined the Estrella Galicia team in the JuniorGP championship, where he finished 13th overall after scoring points in every event, marking his debut in the category.

Alsina competed in the European Talent Cup season with Artbox.

== Death ==
On 19 July 2025, Alsina suffered an accident while training at the MotorLand circuit in Aragon, being thrown over his bike hitting the ground. He underwent surgery in a Zaragoza hospital, but died two days later, aged 17.

== Career statistics ==
=== Races by year ===
(key) (Races in bold indicate pole position; races in italics indicate fastest lap)

Year	Bike	1	2	3	4	5	6	7	8	9	10	11	12	Pos	Pts
2021	Honda	EST; 25	EST; 25	VAL; 17	VAL; 13	CAT; 13	ALG; 15	ARA; Ret	ARA; C	JER; DNS	JER; 7	VAL; 14	VAL; 14	17th	20
2022	Honda	EST; 7	EST; 9	VAL; 12	VAL; 9	CAT; 24	JER; 16	JER; 13	ALG; 14	ARA; DNS	ARA; 10	VAL; 10		14th	44
2023	Honda	EST; 9	EST; 13	VAL; 7	VAL; 14	JER; 16	JER; 15	ALG; 7	CAT; 22	ARA; 7	ARA; 14	VAL; 12		14th	46
2024	Honda	MIS; 16	MIS; 8	EST; Ret	EST; 5	CAT; 8	ALG; 6	JER; 12	JER; 15	ARA; Ret	ARA; Ret	EST; Ret		13th	42

=== FIM JuniorGP World Championship ===
==== Races by year ====
(key) (Races in bold indicate pole position; races in italics indicate fastest lap)

Year	Bike	1	2	3	4	5	6	7	8	9	10	11	12	Pos	Pts
2025	Honda	EST; Ret	JER; 11	JER; 8	MAG; 14	ARA	ARA	MIS	MIS	CAT	CAT	VAL	VAL	16th*	15

* Season still in progress.
