= Terence O'Gorman =

Irish poet

Terence O'Gorman (1919–2003) was a poet from County Cavan, Ireland.

His work was heavily influenced by W. B. Yeats and displays an appreciation of the natural beauty of County Monaghan and County Cavan and of the minutiae of family life. He was born on a small farm at Drumnaveigh near Ballyjamesduff in east Cavan.
