= Gorman, South Dakota =

Unincorporated community in South Dakota, U.S.

Coordinates: 44°55′37″N 100°04′29″W

Gorman is an unincorporated community in Potter County, in the U.S. state of South Dakota.

== History ==
Gorman was laid out in 1910 by Roscoe Thurlow Gorman, and named for him. It was established on the railroad, approximately ten miles south-south east of Gettysburg and about ten miles north of Agar. The legal description is Potter County, Artichoke township, T. 117 N., R. 77 W. straddling Sections 24 and 25 on the Artichoke creek.

At its height, Gorman housed a grain elevator of the George P. Sexton company, a U.S. Post Office named for the town, a school, a blacksmith shop and a mercantile. The population of Gorman in 1911 was estimated to be about 400 people, including the nearby farms. By 1920, the population was reduced to 63. The Post Office closed in 1945, followed by the store and the grain elevators. The one-room school finally closed in the early 1950s.

The post office remained open from 1911 to 1945. The list of postmasters is as follows: Roscoe T. Gorman (installed Jan. 27, 1911), Ernest Eggers (installed Dec. 16, 1913), Cornelia A. Goding (installed June 5, 1915), Willie W. Wolf (installed June 26, 1920), Henry Hawkinson (installed Nov. 28, 1921), Annie L. Hawkinson (installed July 31, 1922), Fannie L. Smith (installed Mar. 5, 1923), John W. Smith (installed June 20, 1938).

Gorman was finally incorporated into Gettysburg on July 15, 1945.
