= Justice Gorman =

Justice Gorman may refer to:

- Ellen Gorman (born 1955), associate justice of the Maine Supreme Judicial Court
- Robert N. Gorman (1896–1962), associate justice of the Ohio Supreme Court
- Sir William Gorman (politician) (1891–1964), British judge and politician
