= Kieran O'Gorman =

Irish hurler

Personal information
- Native name: Ciarán Ó Gormáin (Irish)
- Nickname: Cuggs
- Born: Lismore, County Waterford

Sport
- Sport: Hurling
- Position: Corner-back
Club
- Years: Club
- 1980s-2000s: Lismore
Club titles
- Waterford titles: 2
Inter-county
- Years: County
- 1990s: Waterford
Inter-county titles
- Munster titles: 0
- All-Irelands: 0
- All Stars: 0

Kieran O'Gorman (born 1972) is a retired Irish hurler who formerly played with Lismore GAA at club level and with Waterford GAA at inter-county level.

O'Gorman generally played at either full-back or corner-back and was noted his large stature, standing at over 6 feet (1.8 m) tall. O'Gorman's main achievement was winning the All-Ireland Under 21 Hurling Championship in 1992 with Waterford GAA. O'Gorman also played for a number of years with the Waterford Senior Hurling Team.

O'Gorman played club hurling with Lismore GAA right into the 2000s. Success came early in his club career having won Waterford Senior Hurling Championships in both 1991 and 1993. Later on his career, he played in a Lismore GAA side notable for coming very close in the championship but ultimately failing at either the final hurdle or the semi-final stage. He went on to lose a further 2 finals and numerous semi-finals, all to Ballygunner GAA.

== Honours ==
- All-Ireland Under 21 Hurling Championship winner - 1992
- Munster Under-21 Hurling Championship winner - 1992
- Waterford Senior Hurling Championship winner - 1991 and 1993
- Waterford Minor Hurling Championship winner - 1990
