= James F. O'Gorman =

American art historian

James F. O'Gorman (born 1933) is a leading American architectural historian, author, lecturer, editor, and consultant who taught for many years at Wellesley College. O'Gorman received a B.Arch. degree from the School of Architecture at Washington University in St. Louis in 1956 and an M.Arch. from the University of Illinois, Urbana-Champaign, in 1961. He earned a Ph.D. in Art History from Harvard University in 1966.

O'Gorman is particularly known for his research and writing on the nineteenth-century American architects Henry Hobson Richardson, Frank Furness, Hammatt Billings, Isaiah Rogers, and Gervase Wheeler. He is also known for his popular introduction to architecture: ABC of Architecture. O'Gorman has retired from teaching and currently resides in Portland, Maine.

He was named a Fellow of the Society of Architectural Historians in 2007.

== Books ==
- O'Gorman, James F., ABC of Architecture, University of Pennsylvania Press, Philadelphia 1998, ISBN 0-8122-3423-5
- O'Gorman, James F., Accomplished in All Departments of Art: Hammatt Billings of Boston, 1818-1874, University of Massachusetts Press, Amherst 1998, ISBN 1-55849-148-1
- O'Gorman, James F., The Architecture of Frank Furness, Philadelphia Museum of Art, Philadelphia 1973
- O'Gorman, James F., editor, Aspects of American Printmaking, 1800-1950, Syracuse University Press, Syracuse 1988, ISBN 0-8156-2427-1
- O'Gorman, James F., Connecticut Valley Vernacular: The Vanishing Landscape and Architecture of the New England Tobacco Fields, University of Pennsylvania Press, Philadelphia 2002, ISBN 0-8122-3670-X
- O'Gorman, James F., H. H. Richardson: Architectural Forms for an American Society, University of Chicago Press, Chicago 1987, ISBN 0-226-62069-7
- O'Gorman, James F., H. H. Richardson and His Office: Selected Drawings, David R. Godine, Boston 1974, ISBN 0-914630-00-8
- O'Gorman, James F., Living Architecture: A Biography of H. H. Richardson, Simon & Schuster, NY 1997, ISBN 0-684-83618-1
- O'Gorman, James F., On the Boards: Drawings by Nineteenth-century Boston Architects, University of Pennsylvania Press, Philadelphia 1989, ISBN 0-8122-8170-5
- O'Gorman, James F., Three American Architects: Richardson, Sullivan, and Wright, 1865-1915, University of Chicago Press, Chicago 1991, ISBN 0-226-62071-9
- O'Gorman, James F., The Architecture of the Monastic Library in Italy 1300-1600, New York University Press, New York 1972
- O'Gorman, James F., This Other Gloucester, Boston 1976
- O'Gorman, James F., The Landscape & Architecture of Wellesley College, Wellesley 2000
- O'Gorman, James F., The Perspective of Anglo-American Architecture, Athenaeum of Philadelphia, Philadelphia 1995
- O'Gorman, James F., American Architects and Their Books to 1848, University of Massachusetts Press, Amherst 2001
- O'Gorman, James F., The Makers of Trinity Church in the City of Boston, University of Massachusetts Press, Amherst 2004
- O'Gorman, James F., Henry Austin, Wesleyan University Press, Middletown 2009
