= Sic58 Squadra Corse =

Italian motorcycle racing team

- 2026 name: Moto3: Sic58 Squadra Corse
- Base: Misano World Circuit Marco Simoncelli, Misano Adriatico, Emilia-Romagna, Italy
- Principal: Paolo Simoncelli
- Rider(s): Moto3: 5. Leo Rammerstorfer; 67. Casey O'Gorman
- Motorcycle: Moto3: Honda NSF250RW
- Tyres: Moto3: Pirelli
- Riders' Championships: CIV PreMoto3: 2014: Tony Arbolino

Sic58 Squadra Corse is an Italian motorcycle racing team. It was founded by Paolo Simoncelli in 2013—in honour of his son, Marco Simoncelli. The team currently competes in the Moto3 World Championship. It has previously participated in the Italian FIM CIV, Spanish FIM CEV and European Talent Cup.

== History ==
The team was formed by Paolo Simoncelli in 2013 after the death of his son, MotoGP rider Marco Simoncelli, at the 2011 Malaysian Grand Prix. The team name Sic58 Squadra Corse (English: Sic58 Racing Team) is a reference to Marco's nickname "Super Sic" or simply "Sic" and his former racing number 58, which was retired from use in the MotoGP class following his death. The formation of the team was also supported by compatriot Fausto Gresini, who had been Simoncelli's team boss at the time of his death. The intention of the Sic58 team is to promote the careers of young Italian motorcycle racers.

The team originally entered the FIM CIV Moto3 Junior Championship in Italy. Simoncelli quickly realized that in order for his riders to get to the World Championship level, they would need to prove themselves in the more competitive and better-organized Spanish FIM CEV Repsol Moto3 Junior World Championship, so the team began competing in that series in 2015. Sic58 achieved their first taste of international success with a win from Italian rider Tony Arbolino at the second race in the 2016 CEV round in Jerez. The team also enters riders in the European Talent Cup, a support series of FIM CEV Repsol.

In 2017, Sic58 entered the Moto3 World Championship with existing team rider Tony Arbolino partnered with new signing Tatsuki Suzuki, a Japanese rider with previous Moto3 World Championship experience. The team had a difficult start. Arbolino achieved only a single points finish, finishing 34th in the riders' standings. Suzuki achieved points finishes in all races he completed, including a best finish of 4th, but 7 retirements limited him to 71 points and 14th position in the riders' standings. For 2018, Arbolino was replaced by compatriot Niccolò Antonelli coming from the Red Bull KTM Ajo team. The season was only a slight improvement over 2017, with both Suzuki and Antonelli repeating the former's 71 points and finishing 14th and 15th in the riders' standings respectively. The team finished 7th of 16 teams, with 2018 being the first year a Moto3 teams' championship was counted.

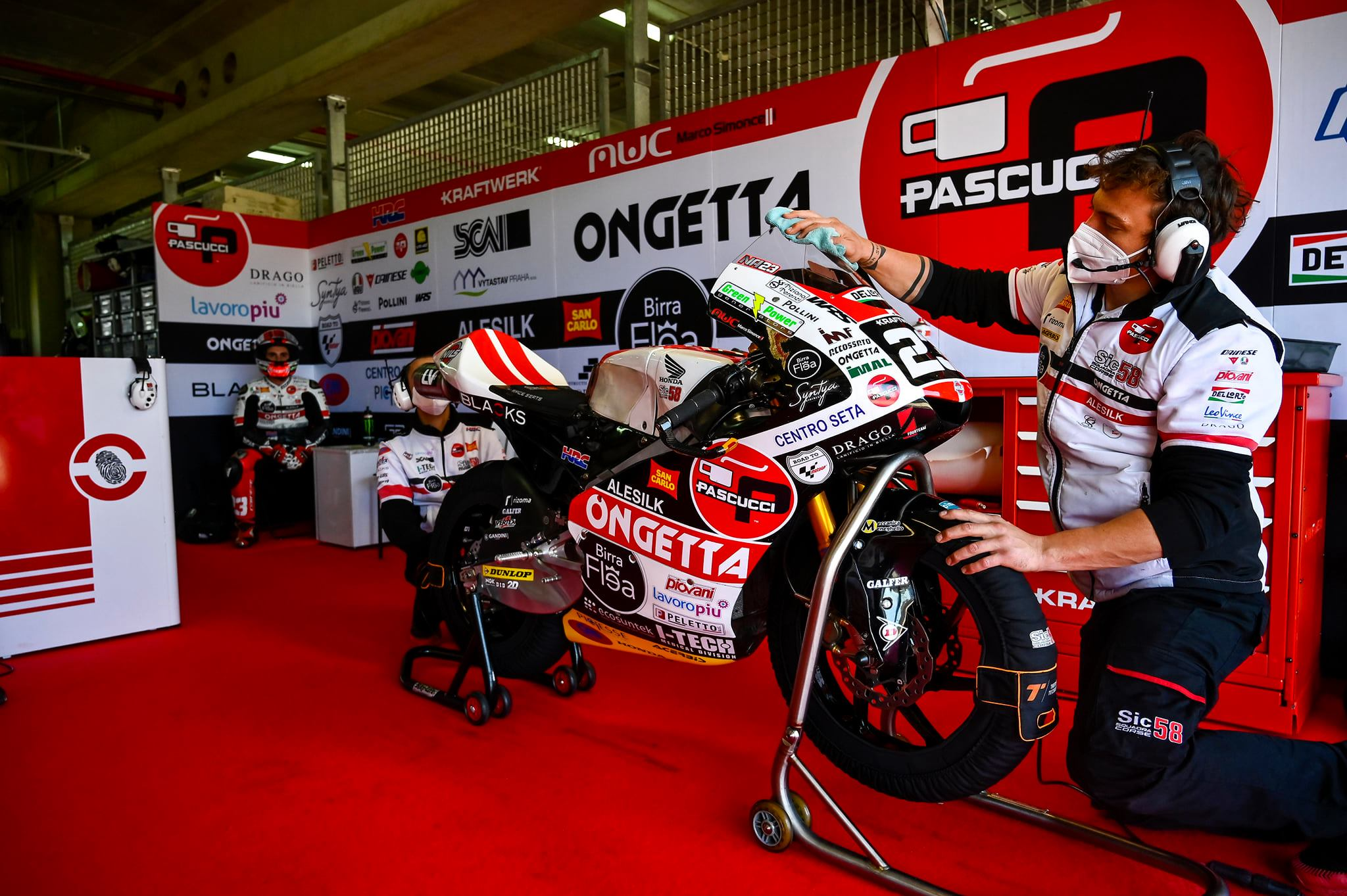

In 2019, Sic58 achieved their first success on the world stage with a 1-2 finish from Antonelli and Suzuki. The win occurred in the fourth round of the championship at Jerez, coincidentally the same location of Marco Simoncelli's maiden World Championship victory in the former 125 cc class, leading to an emotional celebration from the team. Suzuki repeated success for the team with a win in San Marino. The remainder of the season was however plagued by multiple injuries for Antonelli, and 8 retirements for Suzuki, limiting both riders to 7th and 8th in the riders' standings respectively, and the team to 2nd in the team standings. The team was additionally granted a slot in the inaugural 2019 season of the MotoE World Cup, achieving one 3rd place podium finish at the San Marino round.

== Results ==
Year	Class	Team name	Motorcycle	No.	Riders	Races	Wins	Podiums	Poles	F. laps	Points	Pos.
2017	Moto3	Sic58 Squadra Corse	Honda NSF250RW	14	(Italy) Tony Arbolino	18	0	0	0	0	2	34th
2017	Moto3	Sic58 Squadra Corse	Honda NSF250RW	24	(Japan) Tatsuki Suzuki	18	0	0	0	0	71	14th
2018	Moto3	Sic58 Squadra Corse	Honda NSF250RW	23	(Italy) Niccolò Antonelli	16	0	0	1	0	71	15th
2018	Moto3	Sic58 Squadra Corse	Honda NSF250RW	24	(Japan) Tatsuki Suzuki	17	0	0	0	0	71	14th
2018	Moto3	Sic58 Squadra Corse	Honda NSF250RW	55	(Italy) Yari Montella	1	0	0	0	0	0	37th
2018	Moto3	Sic58 Squadra Corse	Honda NSF250RW	55	(Italy) Yari Montella	1	0	0	0	0	0	37th
2019	Moto3	Sic58 Squadra Corse	Honda NSF250RW	23	(Italy) Niccolò Antonelli	15	1	1	3	2	128	7th
2019	Moto3	Sic58 Squadra Corse	Honda NSF250RW	24	(Japan) Tatsuki Suzuki	19	1	2	1	2	124	8th
2019	Moto3	Sic58 Squadra Corse	Honda NSF250RW	32	(Italy) Davide Pizzoli	1 (2)	0	0	0	0	0	36th
2019	Moto3	Sic58 Squadra Corse	Honda NSF250RW	3	(Italy) Kevin Zannoni	1 (2)	0	0	0	0	0	39th
2019	MotoE	Ongetta SIC58 Squadra Corse	Energica Ego Corsa	27	(Italy) Mattia Casadei	6	0	1	0	0	39	10th
2020	Moto3	SIC58 Squadra Corse	Honda NSF250RW	23	(Italy) Niccolò Antonelli	14	0	0	0	0	40	19th
2020	Moto3	SIC58 Squadra Corse	Honda NSF250RW	24	(Japan) Tatsuki Suzuki	13	1	2	3	0	83	12th
2020	Moto3	SIC58 Squadra Corse	Honda NSF250RW	20	(Spain) José Julián García	2	0	0	0	0	0	NC
2020	MotoE	Ongetta SIC58 Squadra Corse	Energica Ego Corsa	27	(Italy) Mattia Casadei	7	0	2	0	0	74	5th
2021	Moto3	Sic58 Squadra Corse	Honda NSF250RW	20	(France) Lorenzo Fellon	18	0	0	0	0	0	33rd
2021	Moto3	Sic58 Squadra Corse	Honda NSF250RW	24	(Japan) Tatsuki Suzuki	18	0	0	2	1	76	14th
2021	MotoE	Ongetta Sic58 Squadracorse	Energica Ego Corsa	27	(Italy) Mattia Casadei	6	0	3	0	0	79	6th
2021	MotoE	Ongetta Sic58 Squadracorse	Energica Ego Corsa	43	(Italy) Stefano Valtulini	1	0	0	0	0	1	19th
2022	Moto3	Sic58 Squadra Corse	Honda NSF250RW	20	(France) Lorenzo Fellon	19	0	0	0	0	11	25th
2022	Moto3	Sic58 Squadra Corse	Honda NSF250RW	54	(Italy) Riccardo Rossi	20	0	1	0	1	87	14th
2022	Moto3	Sic58 Squadra Corse	Honda NSF250RW	29	(Australia) Harrison Voight	1	0	0	0	0	0	40th
2022	MotoE	Ongetta Sic58 Squadracorse	Energica Ego Corsa	21	(Italy) Kevin Zannoni	12	0	0	0	0	71.5	10th
2023	Moto3	Sic58 Squadra Corse	Honda NSF250RW	27	(Japan) Kaito Toba	20	0	1	0	0	105	11th
2023	Moto3	Sic58 Squadra Corse	Honda NSF250RW	54	(Italy) Riccardo Rossi	20	0	0	0	0	79	14th
2023	MotoE	Ongetta Sic58 Squadracorse	Ducati V21L	21	(Italy) Kevin Zannoni	16	0	2	2	0	130	9th
2023	MotoE	Ongetta Sic58 Squadracorse	Ducati V21L	34	(Italy) Kevin Manfredi	16	0	2	0	1	117	10th
2024	Moto3	Sic58 Squadra Corse	Honda NSF250RW	7	(Italy) Filippo Farioli	20	0	0	0	0	32	19th
2024	Moto3	Sic58 Squadra Corse	Honda NSF250RW	57	(Malaysia) Danial Shahril	1	0	0	0	0	0	31st
2024	Moto3	Sic58 Squadra Corse	Honda NSF250RW	58	(Italy) Luca Lunetta	19	0	2	0	1	112	12th
2024	MotoE	Ongetta Sic58 Squadra Corse	Ducati V21L	34	(Italy) Kevin Manfredi	16	0	0	0	0	56	15th
2024	MotoE	Ongetta Sic58 Squadra Corse	Ducati V21L	55	(Italy) Massimo Roccoli	15	0	0	0	0	88	13th
2025	Moto3	Sic58 Squadra Corse	Honda NSF250RW	58	(Italy) Luca Lunetta	18	0	2	0	1	125	12th
2025	Moto3	Sic58 Squadra Corse	Honda NSF250RW	48	(Switzerland) Lennox Phommara	2	0	0	0	0	0	36th
2025	Moto3	Sic58 Squadra Corse	Honda NSF250RW	67	(Republic of Ireland) Casey O'Gorman	2 (4)	0	0	0	0	3 (16)	25th
2025	Moto3	Sic58 Squadra Corse	Honda NSF250RW	82	(Italy) Stefano Nepa	18	0	0	0	0	51	18th
2025	MotoE	Ongetta Sic58 Squadra Corse	Ducati V21L	28	(Italy) Tommaso Occhi	14	0	0	0	0	15	18th
2025	MotoE	Ongetta Sic58 Squadra Corse	Ducati V21L	77	(Italy) Raffaele Fusco	14	0	0	0	0	36	17th
2026	Moto3	Sic58 Squadra Corse	Honda NSF250RW	5	(Austria) Leo Rammerstorfer	18	0	0	0	0	2*	26th*
2026	Moto3	Sic58 Squadra Corse	Honda NSF250RW	67	(Republic of Ireland) Casey O'Gorman	19	0	0	0	1	66*	18th*

Key
Regular rider
Replacement rider
Wildcard rider
Replacement/wildcard rider

Notes

* Season still in progress.
