= 2026 San Marino and Rimini Riviera motorcycle Grand Prix =

Motorcycle races in Misano Adriatico

2026 San Marino and Rimini Riviera Grand Prix
Race details
- Race 14 of 22 races in the 2026 Grand Prix motorcycle racing season
- Date: 13 September 2026
- Official name: Red Bull Grand Prix of San Marino and the Rimini Riviera
- Location: Misano World Circuit Marco Simoncelli; Misano Adriatico, Province of Rimini, Italy
- Course: Permanent racing facility; 4.226 km (2.626 mi)

MotoGP
Pole position
Rider	(Italy) Marco Bezzecchi	Aprilia
Time	1:29.982	
Fastest lap
Rider	(Spain) Fermín Aldeguer	Ducati
Time	1:30.936 on lap 22	
Podium
First	(Spain) Marc Márquez	Ducati
Second	(Spain) Álex Márquez	Ducati
Third	(Spain) Pedro Acosta	KTM

Moto2
Pole position
Rider	(Australia) Senna Agius	Kalex
Time	1:33.718	
Fastest lap
Rider	(Czech Republic) Filip Salač	Kalex
Time	1:34.666 on lap 7	
Podium
First	(Spain) Manuel González	Kalex
Second	(Netherlands) Collin Veijer	Kalex
Third	(Belgium) Barry Baltus	Kalex

Moto3
Pole position
Rider	(Spain) David Almansa	KTM
Time	1:40.612	
Fastest lap
Rider	(Spain) Máximo Quiles	KTM
Time	1:40.366 on lap 15	
Podium
First	(Spain) Máximo Quiles	KTM
Second	(Spain) David Almansa	KTM
Third	(Spain) Brian Uriarte	KTM

The 2026 San Marino and Rimini Riviera motorcycle Grand Prix (officially known as the Red Bull Grand Prix of San Marino and the Rimini Riviera) was the fourteenth round of the 2026 Grand Prix motorcycle racing season. All races were held at the Misano World Circuit Marco Simoncelli in Misano Adriatico on 13 September 2026.

== MotoGP Sprint ==
The MotoGP Sprint was held on 12 September 2026.

Pos.	No.	Rider	Team	Manufacturer	Laps	Time/Retired	Grid	Points
1	93	(Spain) Marc Márquez	Ducati Lenovo Team	Ducati	13	19:48.519	2	12
2	72	(Italy) Marco Bezzecchi	Aprilia Racing	Aprilia	13	+1.068	1	9
3	89	(Spain) Jorge Martín	Aprilia Racing	Aprilia	13	+3.538	5	7
4	49	(Italy) Fabio Di Giannantonio	Pertamina Enduro VR46 Racing Team	Ducati	13	+3.968	4	6
5	73	(Spain) Álex Márquez	BK8 Gresini Racing MotoGP	Ducati	13	+4.348	9	5
6	37	(Spain) Pedro Acosta	Red Bull KTM Factory Racing	KTM	13	+6.944	7	4
7	25	(Spain) Raúl Fernández	SuperFile Trackhouse MotoGP Team	Aprilia	13	+7.707	10	3
8	54	(Spain) Fermín Aldeguer	BK8 Gresini Racing MotoGP	Ducati	13	+8.832	3	2
9	10	(Italy) Luca Marini	Honda HRC Castrol	Honda	13	+11.712	6	1
10	5	(France) Johann Zarco	Castrol Honda LCR	Honda	13	+14.534	11	
11	11	(Brazil) Diogo Moreira	Pro Honda LCR	Honda	13	+17.043	15	
12	21	(Italy) Franco Morbidelli	Pertamina Enduro VR46 Racing Team	Ducati	13	+17.405	8	
13	63	(Italy) Francesco Bagnaia	Ducati Lenovo Team	Ducati	13	+17.763	14	
14	33	(South Africa) Brad Binder	Red Bull KTM Factory Racing	KTM	13	+18.181	19	
15	23	(Italy) Enea Bastianini	Red Bull KTM Tech3	KTM	13	+18.476	16	
16	44	(Spain) Pol Espargaró	Red Bull KTM Tech3	KTM	13	+18.752	12	
17	43	(Australia) Jack Miller	Prima Pramac Yamaha MotoGP	Yamaha	13	+21.113	18	
18	7	(Turkey) Toprak Razgatlıoğlu	Prima Pramac Yamaha MotoGP	Yamaha	13	+20.698 (Note: Demoted one position for exceeding track limits on the final lap.)	21	
19	42	(Spain) Álex Rins	Monster Energy Yamaha MotoGP Team	Yamaha	13	+21.740	20	
20	36	(Spain) Joan Mir	Honda HRC Castrol	Honda	13	+22.054	17	
21	20	(France) Fabio Quartararo	Monster Energy Yamaha MotoGP Team	Yamaha	13	+24.419	13	
Fastest sprint lap: (Spain) Marc Márquez (Ducati) - 1:30.734 (lap 11)
Official MotoGP Sprint Report

== Race ==
=== MotoGP ===
Pos.	No.	Rider	Team	Manufacturer	Laps	Time/Retired	Grid	Points
1	93	(Spain) Marc Márquez	Ducati Lenovo Team	Ducati	27	41:13.013	2	25
2	73	(Spain) Álex Márquez	BK8 Gresini Racing MotoGP	Ducati	27	+0.657	9	20
3	37	(Spain) Pedro Acosta	Red Bull KTM Factory Racing	KTM	27	+2.326	7	16
4	54	(Spain) Fermín Aldeguer	BK8 Gresini Racing MotoGP	Ducati	27	+6.027	3	13
5	89	(Spain) Jorge Martín	Aprilia Racing	Aprilia	27	+14.021	5	11
6	25	(Spain) Raúl Fernández	SuperFile Trackhouse MotoGP Team	Aprilia	27	+18.252	10	10
7	49	(Italy) Fabio Di Giannantonio	Pertamina Enduro VR46 Racing Team	Ducati	27	+20.581	4	9
8	23	(Italy) Enea Bastianini	Red Bull KTM Tech3	KTM	27	+20.858	16	8
9	10	(Italy) Luca Marini	Honda HRC Castrol	Honda	27	+22.911	6	7
10	20	(France) Fabio Quartararo	Monster Energy Yamaha MotoGP Team	Yamaha	27	+23.229	12	6
11	33	(South Africa) Brad Binder	Red Bull KTM Factory Racing	KTM	27	+23.905	19	5
12	7	(Turkey) Toprak Razgatlıoğlu	Prima Pramac Yamaha MotoGP	Yamaha	27	+28.031	21	4
13	21	(Italy) Franco Morbidelli	Pertamina Enduro VR46 Racing Team	Ducati	27	+28.927	8	3
14	44	(Spain) Pol Espargaró	Red Bull KTM Tech3	KTM	27	+31.792	11	2
Ret	5	(France) Johann Zarco	Castrol Honda LCR	Honda	24	Accident	14	
Ret	42	(Spain) Álex Rins	Monster Energy Yamaha MotoGP Team	Yamaha	16	Technical	20	
Ret	36	(Spain) Joan Mir	Honda HRC Castrol	Honda	5	Physical	17	
Ret	63	(Italy) Francesco Bagnaia	Ducati Lenovo Team	Ducati	5	Accident	13	
Ret	11	(Brazil) Diogo Moreira	Pro Honda LCR	Honda	2	Accident	15	
Ret	43	(Australia) Jack Miller	Prima Pramac Yamaha MotoGP	Yamaha	1	Accident	18	
Ret	72	(Italy) Marco Bezzecchi	Aprilia Racing	Aprilia	0	Accident	1	
Fastest lap: (Spain) Fermín Aldeguer (Ducati) – 1:30.936 (lap 22)
Official MotoGP Race Report

== Championship standings after the race ==
Below are the standings for the top five riders, constructors, and teams after the round.

=== MotoGP ===
Riders' Championship standings

	Pos.	Rider	Points
1	1	(Spain) Marc Márquez	274
1	2	(Spain) Jorge Martín	274
	3	(Italy) Marco Bezzecchi	241
	4	(Italy) Fabio Di Giannantonio	223
1	5	(Spain) Pedro Acosta	209

Constructors' Championship standings

	Pos.	Constructor	Points
1	1	(Italy) Ducati	412
1	2	(Italy) Aprilia	410
	3	(Austria) KTM	251
	4	(Japan) Honda	137
	5	(Japan) Yamaha	84

Teams' Championship standings

	Pos.	Team	Points
	1	(Italy) Aprilia Racing	515
1	2	(Italy) Ducati Lenovo Team	417
1	3	(United States) SuperFile Trackhouse MotoGP Team	402
	4	(Austria) Red Bull KTM Factory Racing	292
	5	(Italy) Pertamina Enduro VR46 Racing Team	279

=== Moto2 ===
Riders' Championship standings

	Pos.	Rider	Points
	1	(Spain) Manuel González	232.5
	2	(Spain) Izan Guevara	185
1	3	(Spain) Iván Ortolá	157.5
1	4	(Australia) Senna Agius	149
1	5	(Colombia) David Alonso	139

Constructors' Championship standings

Pos.	Constructor	Points
1	(Germany) Kalex	332.5
2	(Italy) Boscoscuro	206
3	(Switzerland) Forward	63

Teams' Championship standings

Pos.	Team	Points
1	(Germany) Liqui Moly Dynavolt Intact GP	381.5
2	(Spain) CFMoto Aspar European Privilege Team	276
3	(Italy) Blu Cru Pramac Yamaha Moto2	202.5
4	(Spain) QJMotor – Green Power – MSi	161.5
5	(United States) OnlyFans American Racing Team	151

=== Moto3 ===
Riders' Championship standings

	Pos.	Rider	Points
	1	(Spain) Máximo Quiles	281
1	2	(Spain) David Almansa	174
1	3	(Spain) Álvaro Carpe	159
	4	(Spain) Brian Uriarte	154
	5	(Argentina) Marco Morelli	138

Constructors' Championship standings

Pos.	Constructor	Points
1	(Austria) KTM	345
2	(Japan) Honda	172

Teams' Championship standings

Pos.	Team	Points
1	(Spain) CFMoto Gaviota Aspar Team	419
2	(Finland) Red Bull KTM Ajo	313
3	(Germany) Liqui Moly Dynavolt Intact GP	239
4	(France) Red Bull KTM Tech3	184
5	(Italy) LevelUp – MTA	143

== Notes ==
Previous race: 2026 Aragon Grand Prix	FIM Grand Prix World Championship; 2026 season	Next race: 2026 Austrian Grand Prix
Previous race: 2025 San Marino Grand Prix	San Marino and Rimini Riviera motorcycle Grand Prix	Next race: 2027 San Marino Grand Prix
