= 2023 MotoGP World Championship =

75th running of the MotoGP World Championship

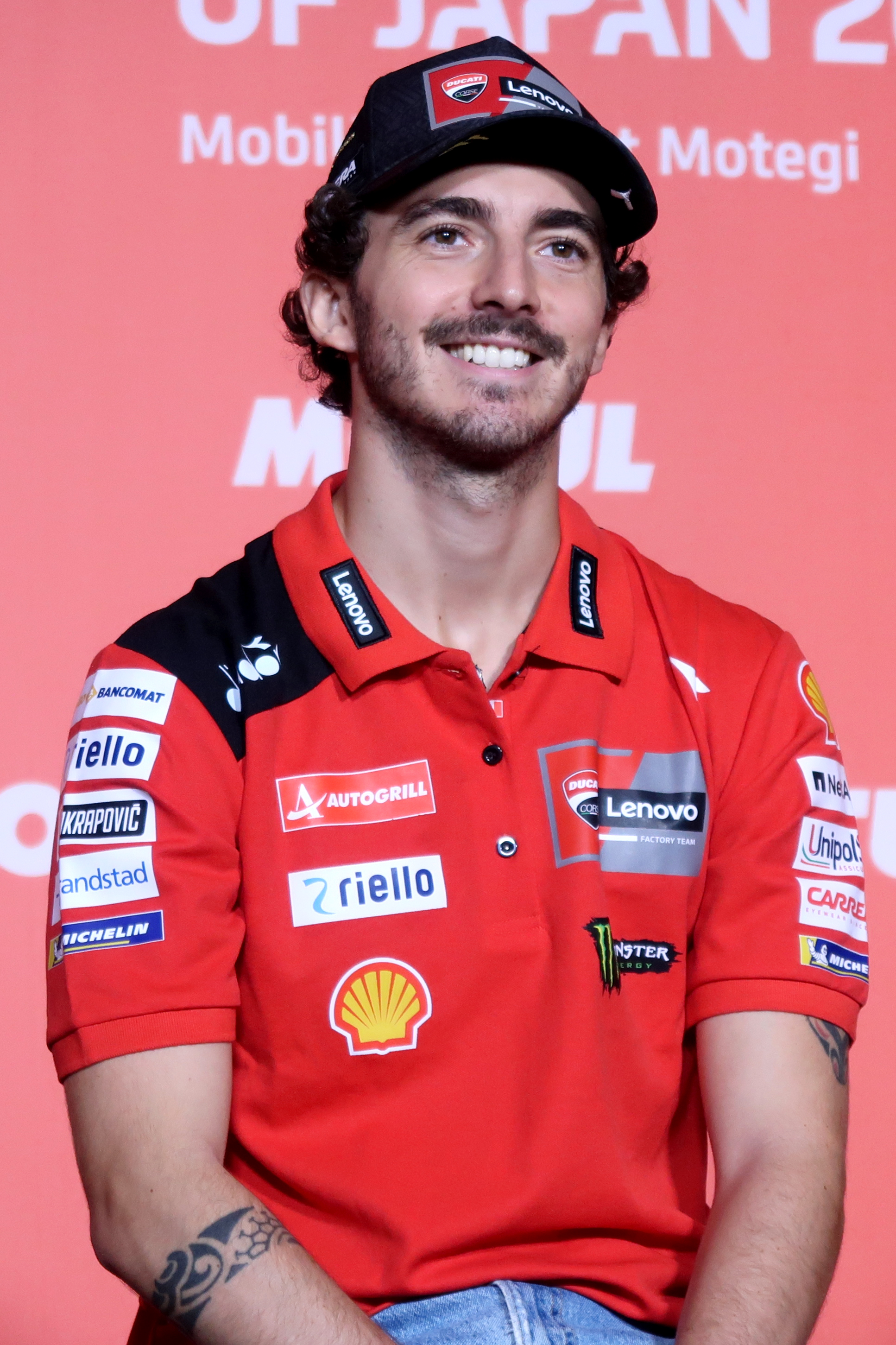
Francesco Bagnaia was the 2023 MotoGP World Riders' Champion. He won his second consecutive World Riders' Championship with Ducati.

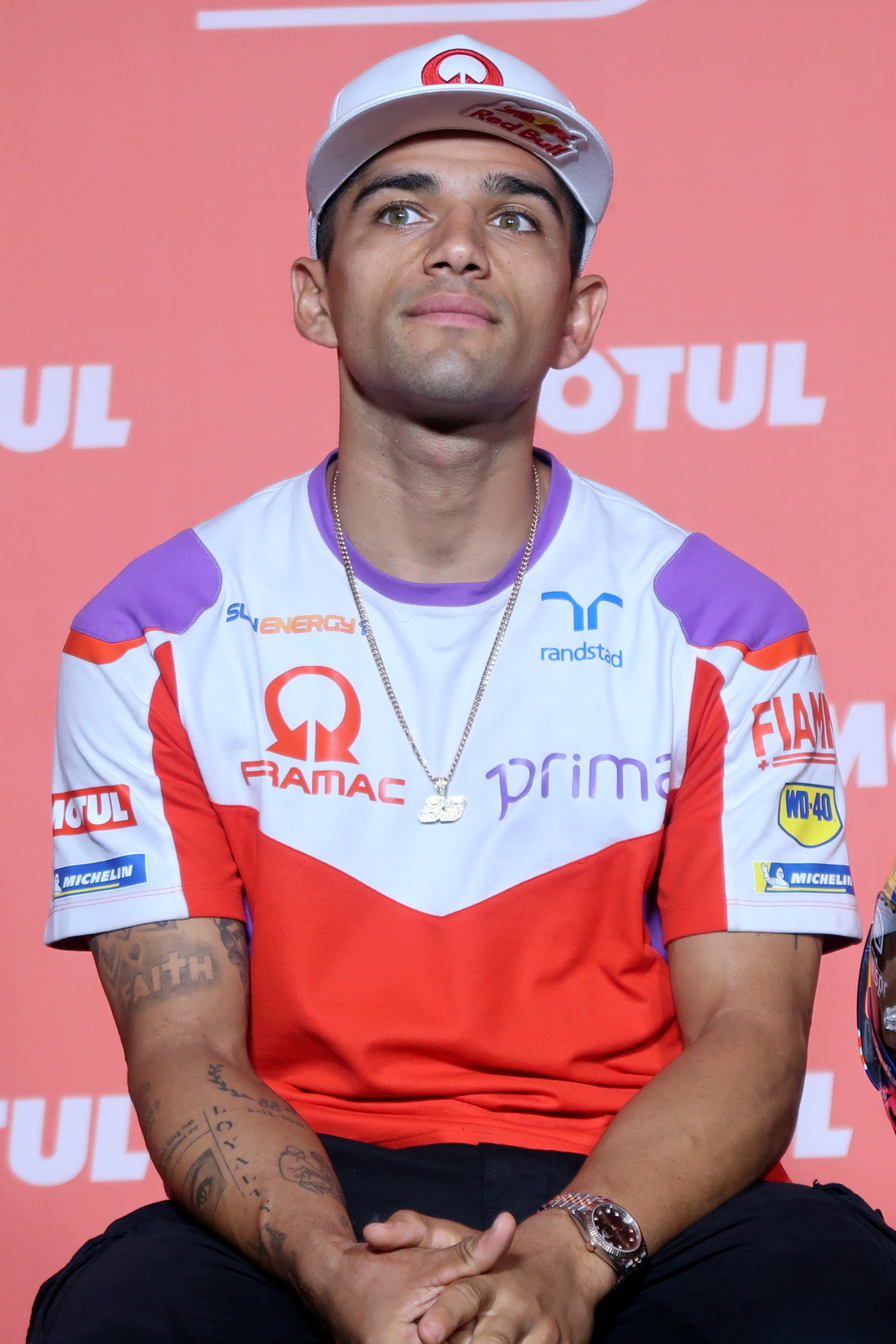
Jorge Martín finished runner-up.

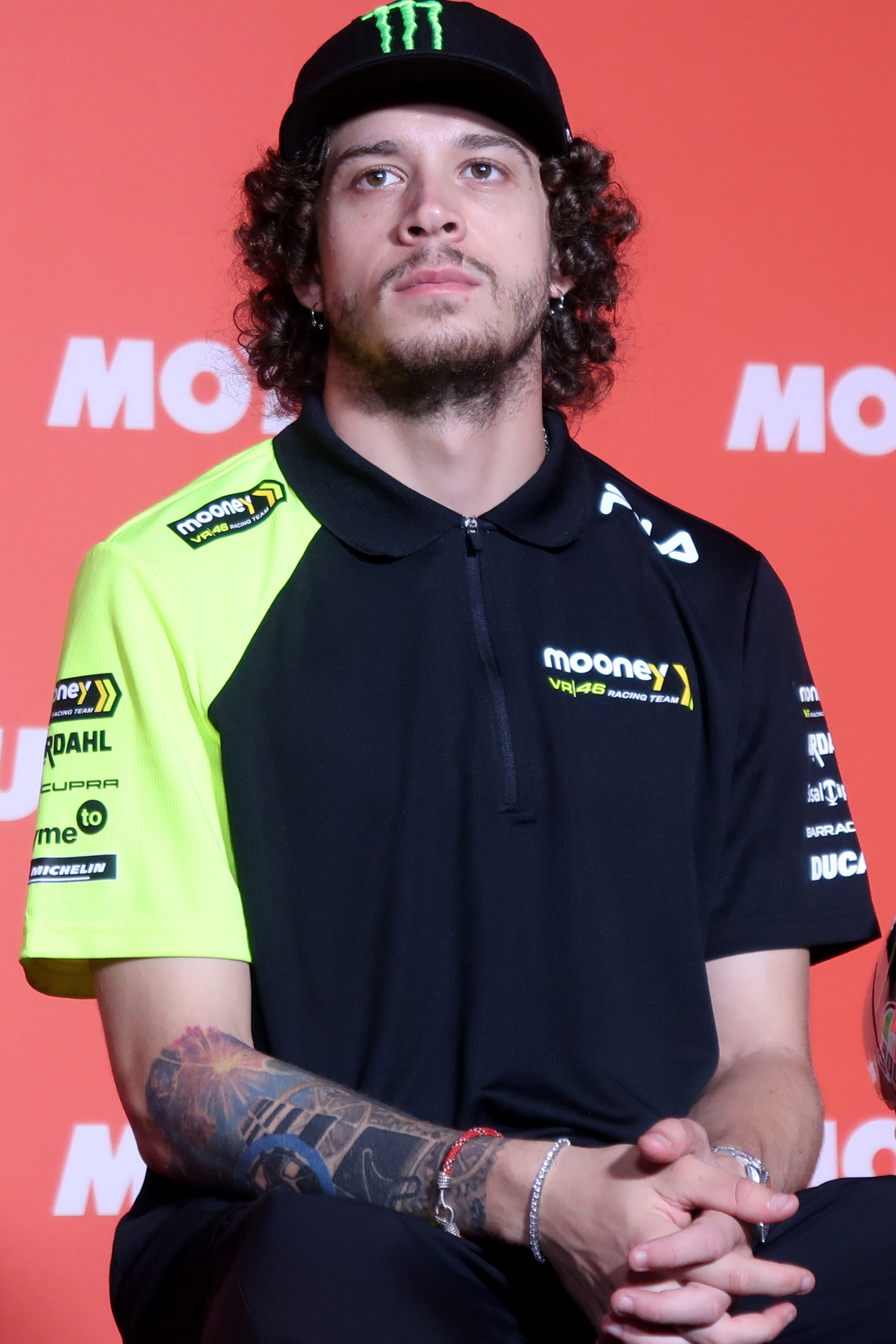
Marco Bezzecchi finished third.

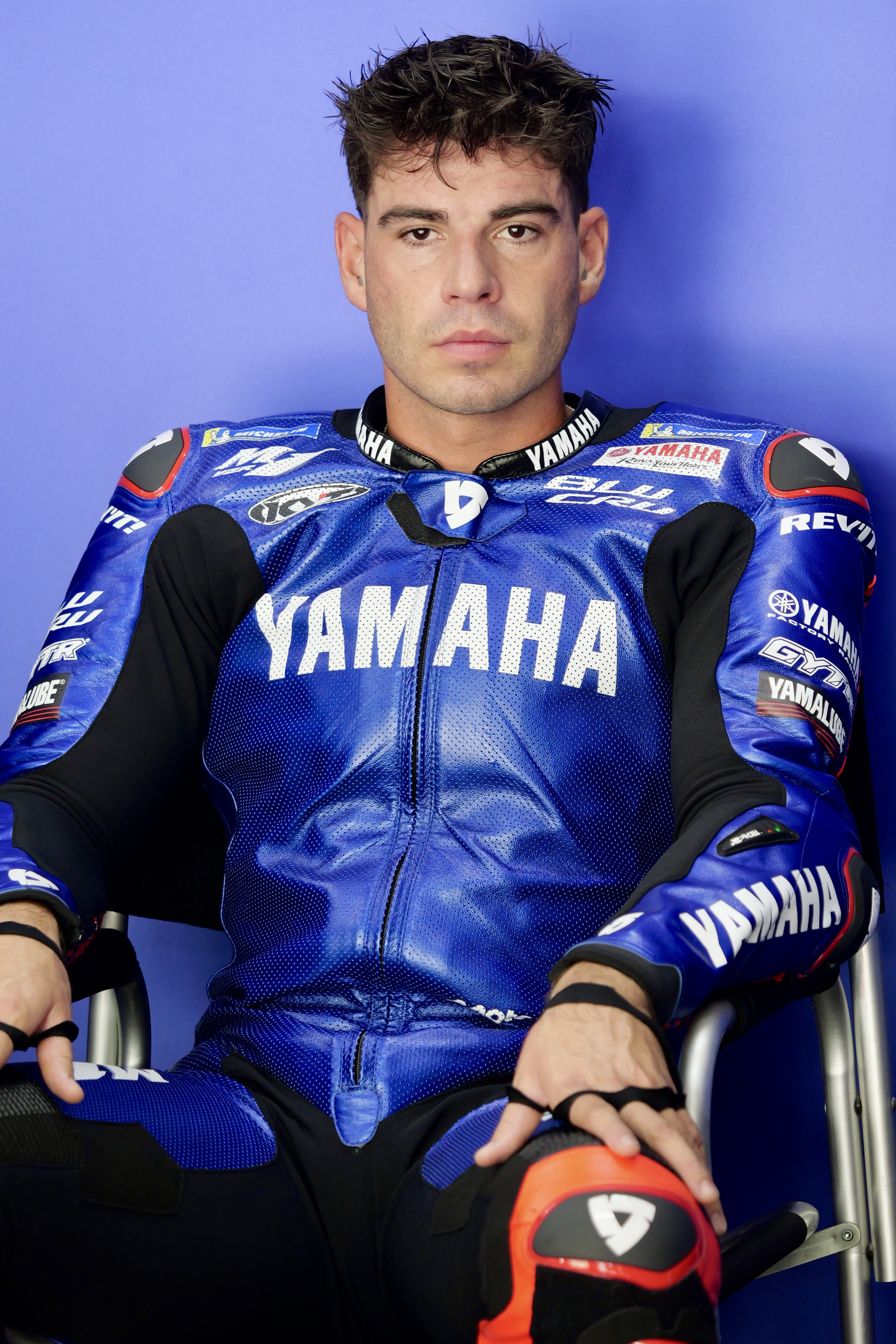
Augusto Fernández (pictured in 2025), the 2023 MotoGP Rookie of the Year.

The 2023 FIM MotoGP World Championship was the premier class of the 75th Fédération Internationale de Motocyclisme (FIM) Road Racing World Championship season, the highest level of competition in motorcycle road racing. The season saw the introduction of sprints on Saturdays, a short-form race of approximately half the length of the main event, in addition to the traditional Grand Prix event on Sundays.

Francesco Bagnaia successfully defended his Riders' Championship at the final race in Valencia, marking the first repeat Riders' Champion for Ducati since the manufacturer entered the series. Winning 17 of 20 Grands Prix and 16 of 19 sprints, Ducati secured their fifth (and fourth consecutive) Constructors' Championship. Ducati satellite team Pramac Racing won the Teams' Championship.

The season was notable for having eight different Grand Prix winners and no back-to-back Grand Prix winners for the first time since the inaugural season in 1949. Manufacturer Yamaha failed to win a single Grand Prix for the first time since 2003.

== Season summary ==
Defending champion Francesco Bagnaia won the inaugural sprint race in Portugal, ahead of Jorge Martín and Marc Márquez, and repeated the win in the main race. At the second round in Argentina, KTM rider Brad Binder took the sprint win, while Marco Bezzecchi took his maiden premier class victory in a wet race. At the Grand Prix of the Americas, Bagnaia took his second sprint victory. Álex Rins stood atop the main race podium ahead of Luca Marini and Fabio Quartararo, marking the LCR Honda team's first win since Argentina 2018.

Starting the European leg of the season in Spain, Brad Binder took the sprint victory head of Francesco Bagnaia, while Bagnaia won the main race ahead of Binder. Both racing sessions were affected by red flags, and KTM rider Jack Miller closed out both podiums. The French round marked the 1000th motorcycle Grand Prix since the series began in 1949. In the sprint, Jorge Martín took his first victory of the season, while Bezzecchi emerged as winner of the main race, followed by Martín and his teammate Johann Zarco. At Mugello, Bagnaia took his second weekend sweep of the season in front of the home crowd, winning both the sprint and main race. In Germany, Jorge Martín took his first weekend sweep, winning both the sprint and main race after several close duels with Bagnaia. At the Assen TT, Bezzecchi took pole position and victory in the sprint, before relinquishing the main race win to Bagnaia, finishing second. Heading into the summer break, Bagnaia led the championship with 194 points ahead of Martín on 159 and Bezzecchi on 158.

Returning to action in Britain, Marco Bezzecchi took his second consecutive pole position, but dropped the sprint win to Álex Márquez, while Francesco Bagnaia failed to score points. Aleix Espargaró took his first win of the season in the main race ahead of Bagnaia, while Bezzecchi crashed out. In Austria, Bagnaia took his third weekend sweep of the season, finishing the main race in dominant fashion 5.1 seconds ahead of Brad Binder, with Bezzecchi taking third. With this result, Bagnaia held a 90-point lead over Jorge Martín at the midpoint of the season.

In Catalunya, Aprilia's Aleix Espargaró swept his home Grand Prix weekend with a sprint win ahead of Bagnaia and a main race win ahead of teammate Maverick Viñales and Jorge Martín. The main race was a disaster for Ducati, who saw five riders crash in a single first-lap incident (Álex Márquez, Enea Bastianini, Marco Bezzecchi, Fabio Di Giannantonio, and Johann Zarco) followed a few corners later by a crash for championship leader Francesco Bagnaia. His legs were run over by Brad Binder's KTM, a resulting minor injury ruled him out of restarting the race and would have further implications for the championship. At the final race of the European leg in Misano, Martín completed a perfect weekend, taking pole position and victory in the sprint and main race, both times ahead of Bezzecchi and Bagnaia.

At the inaugural Indian Grand Prix, Jorge Martín won a rain-delayed sprint followed by Francesco Bagnaia and Marc Márquez. In the main race, Bagnaia crashed out after being involved in a duel with Martín, and Marco Bezzecchi took his third and final victory of the season, over 9 seconds ahead of Martín and Fabio Quartararo. With this result, Martín had reduce the championship gap to 13 points with seven races remaining. At the Japanese round, Jorge Martín again had a perfect weekend, taking pole position and winning the sprint and main race. The main race was red-flagged due to adverse weather conditions on lap 13 of 24. A restart was abandoned by race direction after the race was again red-flagged during the warm-up lap of the restarted race. Per regulations, full points were awarded since at least 50% of the original race distance were completed.

In Indonesia, Jorge Martín won his third consecutive sprint, ahead of Luca Marini and Marco Bezzecchi, securing Ducati its fourth straight Constructors' Championship. With his victory in the sprint, Martín took over the lead of the standings for the first time in the season by 7 points. In the main race, Francesco Bagnaia quickly returned to the top of the standings, after winning from 13th position on the grid and Martín crashing out. The race marked the 500th Grand Prix victory for tyre marque Michelin, whose first victory was in 1973 with Jack Findlay. On Phillip Island, heavy wind conditions caused a weekend schedule change, with the main race taking place on Saturday and the sprint on Sunday, weather permitting. In the main race, Johann Zarco took his maiden win in MotoGP, ahead of Bagnaia and Fabio Di Giannantonio. The sprint was cancelled due to inclement weather. At the Thai round, Jorge Martín had his third perfect weekend of the year, with pole position and sprint and main race wins. In Malaysia, Álex Márquez won the sprint ahead of Martín and Bagnaia, while Enea Bastianini took his first win of the season ahead of Márquez and Bagnaia.

At the penultimate round in Qatar, Luca Marini secured his second career pole position with an all-time lap record at the track. Jorge Martín took the win at the sprint race, while Francesco Bagnaia only managed 5th place. In the main race, Fabio Di Giannantonio took his maiden MotoGP win ahead of Bagnaia and Marini, while Martín struggled to a 10th-place finish. The final round at Valencia saw Martín win his ninth sprint race of the season, cutting the championship gap to 14 points for the finale race. Martin crashed out of the main race while attempting to recover from an early mistake, while Bagnaia took the race victory, sealing his second consecutive MotoGP world title.

== Teams and riders ==
Team	Constructor	Motorcycle	No.	Rider	Rounds
(Italy) Aprilia Racing	Aprilia	RS-GP23	12	(Spain) Maverick Viñales	All
(Italy) Aprilia Racing	Aprilia	RS-GP23	41	(Spain) Aleix Espargaró	All
(Italy) Aprilia Racing	Aprilia	RS-GP23	32	(Italy) Lorenzo Savadori	6, 8, 10
(Malaysia) CryptoData RNF MotoGP Team	Aprilia	RS-GP22	25	(Spain) Raúl Fernández	All
(Malaysia) CryptoData RNF MotoGP Team	Aprilia	RS-GP22	88	(Portugal) Miguel Oliveira	1, 3–4, 6–19
(Malaysia) CryptoData RNF MotoGP Team	Aprilia	RS-GP22	32	(Italy) Lorenzo Savadori	5, 20
(Italy) Ducati Lenovo Team	Ducati	Desmosedici GP23	1	(Italy) Francesco Bagnaia	All
(Italy) Ducati Lenovo Team	Ducati	Desmosedici GP23	23	(Italy) Enea Bastianini	1, 4, 6–11, 15–20
(Italy) Ducati Lenovo Team	Ducati	Desmosedici GP23	51	(Italy) Michele Pirro	3, 13–14
(Italy) Ducati Lenovo Team	Ducati	Desmosedici GP23	9	(Italy) Danilo Petrucci	5
(Italy) Aruba.it Racing	Ducati	Desmosedici GP23	51	(Italy) Michele Pirro	6, 12
(Italy) Aruba.it Racing	Ducati	Desmosedici GP23	19	(Spain) Álvaro Bautista	18
(Italy) Prima Pramac Racing	Ducati	Desmosedici GP23	5	(France) Johann Zarco	All
(Italy) Prima Pramac Racing	Ducati	Desmosedici GP23	89	(Spain) Jorge Martín	All
(Italy) Gresini Racing MotoGP	Ducati	Desmosedici GP22	49	(Italy) Fabio Di Giannantonio	All
(Italy) Gresini Racing MotoGP	Ducati	Desmosedici GP22	73	(Spain) Álex Márquez	1–13, 15–20
(Italy) Mooney VR46 Racing Team	Ducati	Desmosedici GP22	10	(Italy) Luca Marini	1–13, 15–20
(Italy) Mooney VR46 Racing Team	Ducati	Desmosedici GP22	72	(Italy) Marco Bezzecchi	All
(Monaco) LCR Honda Idemitsu (Monaco) LCR Honda Castrol	Honda	RC213V	30	(Japan) Takaaki Nakagami	All
(Monaco) LCR Honda Idemitsu (Monaco) LCR Honda Castrol	Honda	RC213V	42	(Spain) Álex Rins	1–6, 14–16, 20 (Note: Álex Rins was entered for the Friday practice sessions during round 14, before being replaced by Stefan Bradl due to injury.)
(Monaco) LCR Honda Idemitsu (Monaco) LCR Honda Castrol	Honda	RC213V	6	(Germany) Stefan Bradl	8, 13–14
(Monaco) LCR Honda Idemitsu (Monaco) LCR Honda Castrol	Honda	RC213V	27	(Spain) Iker Lecuona	9–11, 18–19
(Monaco) LCR Honda Idemitsu (Monaco) LCR Honda Castrol	Honda	RC213V	7	(Japan) Takumi Takahashi	12
(Japan) Repsol Honda Team	Honda	RC213V	36	(Spain) Joan Mir	1–6, 9–20
(Japan) Repsol Honda Team	Honda	RC213V	27	(Spain) Iker Lecuona	8
(Japan) Repsol Honda Team	Honda	RC213V	93	(Spain) Marc Márquez	1, 5–20
(Japan) Repsol Honda Team	Honda	RC213V	6	(Germany) Stefan Bradl	3
(Japan) Repsol Honda Team	Honda	RC213V	27	(Spain) Iker Lecuona	4
(Japan) HRC Team	Honda	RC213V	6	(Germany) Stefan Bradl	4, 12
(France) GasGas Factory Racing Tech3	KTM	RC16	37	(Spain) Augusto Fernández	All
(France) GasGas Factory Racing Tech3	KTM	RC16	44	(Spain) Pol Espargaró	1, 9–20
(France) GasGas Factory Racing Tech3	KTM	RC16	94	(Germany) Jonas Folger	3–8
(Austria) Red Bull KTM Factory Racing	KTM	RC16	33	(South Africa) Brad Binder	All
(Austria) Red Bull KTM Factory Racing	KTM	RC16	43	(Australia) Jack Miller	All
(Austria) Red Bull KTM Factory Racing	KTM	RC16	26	(Spain) Dani Pedrosa	4, 12
(Japan) Monster Energy Yamaha MotoGP (Note: Wildcard Cal Crutchlow raced under the team name Yamalube RS4GP Racing Team in round 14.)	Yamaha	YZR-M1	20	(France) Fabio Quartararo	All
(Japan) Monster Energy Yamaha MotoGP	Yamaha	YZR-M1	21	(Italy) Franco Morbidelli	All
(Japan) Monster Energy Yamaha MotoGP	Yamaha	YZR-M1	35	(United Kingdom) Cal Crutchlow	14

Key
Regular rider
Replacement rider
Wildcard rider

All teams used series-specified Michelin tyres.

=== Team changes ===
- RNF Racing switched to Aprilia after a season with Yamaha.
- Suzuki withdrew from the MotoGP class at the end of the 2022 season.
- Tech3 KTM Factory Racing were rebranded as GasGas Factory Racing Tech3. The team used KTM bikes. Tech3 continued to own and operate the team.

=== Rider changes ===
- Jack Miller moved to the KTM factory team from the Ducati factory team, replacing Miguel Oliveira. Oliveira then moved to RNF Aprilia MotoGP Team.
- Álex Márquez moved to Gresini Racing MotoGP from LCR Honda, replacing Enea Bastianini. Bastianini was then promoted to the Ducati factory team, replacing Jack Miller.
- Álex Rins moved to LCR Honda from the now defunct Suzuki MotoGP team, replacing Álex Márquez.
- Pol Espargaró moved to the newly rebranded GasGas Factory Racing team from the Repsol Honda Team. He was replaced by Joan Mir, who moved from the now defunct Suzuki MotoGP team.
- Raúl Fernández moved to RNF Aprilia MotoGP Team from Tech3 KTM Factory Racing.
- Remy Gardner left MotoGP for the Superbike World Championship. He was replaced by 2022 Moto2 World Riders' Champion Augusto Fernández, who entered the MotoGP class with the rebranded GasGas Factory Racing team.
- After being left without a place in the MotoGP grid, Darryn Binder went down to Moto2 to make his debut in that class.

==== Mid-season changes ====
- Pol Espargaró missed seven consecutive Grands Prix starting from the Argentine round after suffering numerous injuries during Practice 2 of the Portuguese round. He was not replaced for the Argentine round, but was replaced starting from the Americas round by Jonas Folger.
- Enea Bastianini missed several races during the season. He missed the Argentine and Americas rounds after suffering a fractured right scapula due to a collision with Luca Marini in the sprint of the Portuguese round. He was not replaced for the Argentine round, and was replaced for the Americas round by Michele Pirro. Bastianini also missed the French round after a failed return in the Spanish round which saw him withdraw from the race after Practice 2 due to continuous shoulder pain. He was replaced by Danilo Petrucci. Bastianini also missed the San Marino, Indian, and Japanese rounds after undergoing surgery on his fractured left ankle and left hand that were sustained during the Catalan race. He was not replaced for the San Marino round, and by Pirro again for the Indian and Japanese rounds.
- Marc Márquez missed the Argentine, Americas, and Spanish rounds after suffering a broken first metacarpal due to a collision with Miguel Oliveira during the main race of the Portuguese round. He was not replaced for the Argentine round, replaced by Stefan Bradl for the Americas round, and was replaced by Iker Lecuona for the Spanish round.
- Miguel Oliveira missed several races during the season. He missed the Argentine round due to the aforementioned collision with Márquez during the main race of the previous Portuguese round. Oliveira was declared unfit after further testing and was not replaced. He also missed the French round after he sustained a shoulder injury after a collision with Fabio Quartararo during the previous Spanish round and was replaced by Lorenzo Savadori. He also missed the Valencian round after suffering a fractured scapula during the sprint of the Qatar round, and was replaced by Savadori again.
- Joan Mir missed the German and Dutch rounds after suffering a right hand injury during Practice 2 of the previous Italian round. He was not replaced for the German round, but was replaced by Iker Lecuona for the Dutch round.
- Álex Rins missed seven consecutive Grands Prix starting from the German round after undergoing surgery on a broken right leg that was sustained during the sprint of the Italian round. He was not replaced for the German round, by Stefan Bradl for the Dutch and Indian rounds, by Iker Lecuona for the British, Austrian, and Catalan rounds, and by Takumi Takahashi for the San Marino round. Rins competed during Friday practice sessions for the Japanese round, before being replaced by Bradl after he was declared unfit for the rest of the weekend. Rins also missed the Thailand, Malaysian, and Qatar rounds after having surgery on a hernia on his leg previously broken during the Italian round. He was not replaced for the Thailand round, and by Lecuona again for the Malaysian and Qatar rounds.
- Álex Márquez missed the Japanese round after suffering a double rib fracture during Qualifying 1 of the previous Indian round. He was not replaced.
- Luca Marini missed the Japanese round after suffering a fractured left collarbone during the sprint of the previous Indian round. He was not replaced.

== Rule changes ==
Sprint races were introduced at all Grands Prix. Sprints were held on the Saturday of each Grand Prix weekend and were approximately 50% of the total race distance. Points were awarded to the top 9 finishers on a 12–9–7–6–5–4–3–2–1 basis, similar to the system used in Superbike World Championship Superpole races. The grids for both the Sprint race and the Grand Prix race were set from qualifying, which retained its Q1–Q2 format. There was also one less practice session and the warm-up session as a result. Sprint race wins are not considered as regular Grands Prix wins and instead would have their own "Sprint race wins" statistic.

The weekend format was fixed for every event. Moto3 were followed by Moto2, followed by MotoGP.

Minimum tyre pressure rules were enforced. The use of any device that modifies or adjusts the motorcycle's front ride height while it is moving was forbidden.

Starting from the British round, only the results of the second practice session of each Friday, which is now simply called "Practice", were timed for direct qualification into Qualifying 2. The first practice session on Fridays and the practice session on Saturday were now called "Free Practice 1" and "Free Practice 2", respectively, and the results from both sessions would not be considered for direct Q2 classification.

== Calendar ==
The following Grands Prix took place in 2023:

Round	Date	Grand Prix	Circuit
1	26 March	Grande Prémio Tissot de Portugal	Algarve International Circuit, Portimão
2	2 April	Gran Premio Michelin de la República Argentina	Autódromo Termas de Río Hondo, Termas de Río Hondo
3	16 April	(United States) Red Bull Grand Prix of the Americas	Circuit of the Americas, Austin
4	30 April	(Spain) Gran Premio MotoGP Guru by Gryfyn de España	Circuito de Jerez, Jerez de la Frontera
5	14 May	Shark Grand Prix de France	Bugatti Circuit, Le Mans
6	11 June	(Italy) Gran Premio d'Italia Oakley	Mugello Circuit, Scarperia e San Piero
7	18 June	(Germany) Liqui Moly Motorrad Grand Prix Deutschland	Sachsenring, Hohenstein-Ernstthal
8	25 June	(Netherlands) Motul TT Assen	TT Circuit Assen, Assen
9	6 August	(United Kingdom) Monster Energy British Grand Prix	Silverstone Circuit, Silverstone
10	20 August	(Austria) CryptoData Motorrad Grand Prix von Österreich	Red Bull Ring, Spielberg
11	3 September	(Catalonia) Gran Premi Monster Energy de Catalunya	Circuit de Barcelona-Catalunya, Montmeló
12	10 September	Gran Premio Red Bull di San Marino e della Riviera di Rimini	Misano World Circuit, Misano Adriatico
13	24 September	IndianOil Grand Prix of India	Buddh International Circuit, Greater Noida
14	1 October	Motul Grand Prix of Japan	Motegi Circuit, Motegi
15	15 October	Pertamina Grand Prix of Indonesia	Mandalika International Street Circuit, Mandalika
16	21 October (Note: Race was originally scheduled on 22 October, but was rescheduled due to inclement weather forecast for the original race day.)	(Australia) MotoGP Guru by Gryfyn Australian Motorcycle Grand Prix	Phillip Island Grand Prix Circuit, Phillip Island
17	29 October	OR Thailand Grand Prix	Buriram International Circuit, Buriram
18	12 November	Petronas Grand Prix of Malaysia	Sepang International Circuit, Sepang
19	19 November (Note: Night race)	Qatar Airways Grand Prix of Qatar	Lusail International Circuit, Lusail
20	26 November	(Valencian Community) Gran Premio Motul de la Comunitat Valenciana	Circuit Ricardo Tormo, Valencia
Cancelled Grand Prix
–	~~9 July~~	Kazakhstan motorcycle Grand Prix	Sokol International Racetrack, Almaty

=== Grand Prix locations ===
Location of non-European Grands Prix in 2023.
(scheduled Grand Prix: cancelled Grand Prix)
Location of European Grands Prix in 2023.

=== Calendar changes ===
- For the first time since 2006, Lusail in Qatar did not host the opening round due to "extensive renovation and remodelling to the paddock area and circuit facilities".
- The British Grand Prix returned to the International Paddock of the Silverstone Circuit for the first time since 2012.
- India and Kazakhstan were both scheduled to host their first World Championship motorcycle Grands Prix in 2023 at the Buddh International Circuit and the Sokol International Racetrack, respectively.
- The Hungarian Grand Prix was scheduled to make its debut in 2023 but was postponed until at least 2024 due to the unstarted construction of the circuit.
- The Aragon Grand Prix was omitted from the schedule for the first time since its introduction in 2010.
- The Finnish Grand Prix at Kymi Ring was under contract to feature in 2023, but was not included in the provisional calendar due to safety concerns of the 2022 Russian invasion of Ukraine.
- The Kazakhstan Grand Prix at Sokol International Racetrack was cancelled due to ongoing homologation works at the circuit, paired with global operational challenges. The event was not replaced.

== Results and standings ==
=== Grands Prix ===
Round	Grand Prix	Pole position	Fastest lap	Winning rider	Winning team	Winning constructor	Report
1	(Portugal) Portuguese motorcycle Grand Prix	(Spain) Marc Márquez	(Spain) Aleix Espargaró	(Italy) Francesco Bagnaia	(Italy) Ducati Lenovo Team	(Italy) Ducati	Report
2	(Argentina) Argentine Republic motorcycle Grand Prix	(Spain) Álex Márquez	(Italy) Marco Bezzecchi	(Italy) Marco Bezzecchi	(Italy) Mooney VR46 Racing Team	(Italy) Ducati	Report
3	(United States) Motorcycle Grand Prix of the Americas	(Italy) Francesco Bagnaia	(Spain) Álex Rins	(Spain) Álex Rins	(Monaco) LCR Honda Castrol	(Japan) Honda	Report
4	(Spain) Spanish motorcycle Grand Prix	(Spain) Aleix Espargaró	(Italy) Francesco Bagnaia	(Italy) Francesco Bagnaia	(Italy) Ducati Lenovo Team	(Italy) Ducati	Report
5	(France) French motorcycle Grand Prix	(Italy) Francesco Bagnaia	(Italy) Marco Bezzecchi	(Italy) Marco Bezzecchi	(Italy) Mooney VR46 Racing Team	(Italy) Ducati	Report
6	(Italy) Italian motorcycle Grand Prix	(Italy) Francesco Bagnaia	(Spain) Álex Márquez	(Italy) Francesco Bagnaia	(Italy) Ducati Lenovo Team	(Italy) Ducati	Report
7	(Germany) German motorcycle Grand Prix	(Italy) Francesco Bagnaia	(France) Johann Zarco	(Spain) Jorge Martín	(Italy) Prima Pramac Racing	(Italy) Ducati	Report
8	(Netherlands) Dutch TT	(Italy) Marco Bezzecchi	(Spain) Jorge Martín	(Italy) Francesco Bagnaia	(Italy) Ducati Lenovo Team	(Italy) Ducati	Report
9	(United Kingdom) British motorcycle Grand Prix	(Italy) Marco Bezzecchi	(Spain) Aleix Espargaró	(Spain) Aleix Espargaró	(Italy) Aprilia Racing	(Italy) Aprilia	Report
10	(Austria) Austrian motorcycle Grand Prix	(Italy) Francesco Bagnaia	(Italy) Francesco Bagnaia	(Italy) Francesco Bagnaia	(Italy) Ducati Lenovo Team	(Italy) Ducati	Report
11	(Catalonia) Catalan motorcycle Grand Prix	(Italy) Francesco Bagnaia	(Spain) Maverick Viñales	(Spain) Aleix Espargaró	(Italy) Aprilia Racing	(Italy) Aprilia	Report
12	San Marino and Rimini Riviera motorcycle Grand Prix	(Spain) Jorge Martín	(Italy) Francesco Bagnaia	(Spain) Jorge Martín	(Italy) Prima Pramac Racing	(Italy) Ducati	Report
13	(India) Indian motorcycle Grand Prix	(Italy) Marco Bezzecchi	(Italy) Marco Bezzecchi	(Italy) Marco Bezzecchi	(Italy) Mooney VR46 Racing Team	(Italy) Ducati	Report
14	(Japan) Japanese motorcycle Grand Prix	(Spain) Jorge Martín	(France) Johann Zarco	(Spain) Jorge Martín	(Italy) Prima Pramac Racing	(Italy) Ducati	Report
15	(Indonesia) Indonesian motorcycle Grand Prix	(Italy) Luca Marini	(Italy) Enea Bastianini	(Italy) Francesco Bagnaia	(Italy) Ducati Lenovo Team	(Italy) Ducati	Report
16	(Australia) Australian motorcycle Grand Prix (Note: The sprint at the Australian Grand Prix was cancelled due to inclement weather.)	(Spain) Jorge Martín	(Spain) Jorge Martín	(France) Johann Zarco	(Italy) Prima Pramac Racing	(Italy) Ducati	Report
17	Thailand motorcycle Grand Prix	(Spain) Jorge Martín	(Italy) Marco Bezzecchi	(Spain) Jorge Martín	(Italy) Prima Pramac Racing	(Italy) Ducati	Report
18	(Malaysia) Malaysian motorcycle Grand Prix	(Italy) Francesco Bagnaia	(Spain) Álex Márquez	(Italy) Enea Bastianini	(Italy) Ducati Lenovo Team	(Italy) Ducati	Report
19	Qatar motorcycle Grand Prix	(Italy) Luca Marini	(Italy) Enea Bastianini	(Italy) Fabio Di Giannantonio	(Italy) Gresini Racing MotoGP	(Italy) Ducati	Report
20	Valencian Community motorcycle Grand Prix	(Spain) Maverick Viñales (Note: Maverick Viñales, who set the fastest time in qualifying and started the sprint on pole, received a three-place grid penalty for the main race for not respecting the black flag with orange circle during the warm up practice. As a result, Francesco Bagnaia started the race from pole position, although Viñales was still credited with the pole position statistic.)	(South Africa) Brad Binder	(Italy) Francesco Bagnaia	(Italy) Ducati Lenovo Team	(Italy) Ducati	Report

=== Riders' standings ===
Scoring system

Points were awarded to the top fifteen finishers of the main race and to the top nine of the sprint. A rider had to finish the race to earn points.

Position	1st	2nd	3rd	4th	5th	6th	7th	8th	9th	10th	11th	12th	13th	14th	15th
Race	25	20	16	13	11	10	9	8	7	6	5	4	3	2	1
Sprint	12	9	7	6	5	4	3	2	1						

Pos.	Rider	Bike	Team	POR (Portugal)	ARG (Argentina)	AME (United States)	SPA (Spain)	FRA (France)	ITA (Italy)	GER (Germany)	NED (Netherlands)	GBR (United Kingdom)	AUT (Austria)	CAT (Catalonia)	RSM (San Marino)	IND (India)	JPN (Japan)	INA (Indonesia)	AUS (Australia)	THA (Thailand)	MAL (Malaysia)	QAT (Qatar)	VAL (Valencian Community)	Pts
1	(Italy) Francesco Bagnaia	Ducati	Ducati Lenovo Team	1^{1}	16^{6}	Ret^{P 1}	1^{2 F}	Ret^{P 3}	1^{P 1}	2^{P 2}	1^{2}	2	1^{P 1 F}	DNS^{P 2}	3^{3 F}	Ret^{2}	2^{3}	1^{8}	2	2^{7}	3^{P 3}	2^{5}	1^{5}	467
2	(Spain) Jorge Martín	Ducati	Prima Pramac Racing	Ret^{2}	5^{8}	Ret^{3}	4^{4}	2^{1}	2^{3}	1^{1}	5^{6 F}	6^{6}	7^{3}	3^{5}	1^{P 1}	2^{1}	1^{P 1}	Ret^{1}	5^{P F}	1^{P 1}	4^{2}	10^{1}	Ret^{1}	428
3	(Italy) Marco Bezzecchi	Ducati	Mooney VR46 Racing Team	3	1^{2 F}	6^{6}	Ret^{9}	1^{7 F}	8^{2}	4^{7}	2^{P 1}	Ret^{P 2}	3	12^{8}	2^{2}	1^{P 5 F}	4^{6}	5^{3}	6	4^{6 F}	6^{7}	13	Ret^{7}	329
4	(South Africa) Brad Binder	KTM	Red Bull KTM Factory Racing	6	17^{1}	13^{5}	2^{1}	6^{2}	5	Ret^{6}	4^{5}	3^{9}	2^{2}	Ret^{4}	14^{5}	4^{4}	Ret^{2}	6	4	3^{2}	Ret^{5}	5^{7}	3^{2 F}	293
5	(France) Johann Zarco	Ducati	Prima Pramac Racing	4^{8}	2	7	Ret^{8}	3^{6}	3^{4}	3^{5 F}	Ret	9^{4}	13	4^{7}	10	6	NC^{5 F}	Ret	1	10^{9}	12^{8}	12	2^{9}	225
6	(Spain) Aleix Espargaró	Aprilia	Aprilia Racing	9^{6 F}	15	Ret^{4}	5^{P}	5^{8}	6^{8}	16^{9}	3^{4}	1^{5 F}	9^{7}	1^{1}	12^{8}	Ret	5	10	8	8^{5}	Ret	Ret	8	206
7	(Spain) Maverick Viñales	Aprilia	Aprilia Racing	2^{5}	12^{7}	4	Ret^{7}	Ret^{9}	12	Ret	Ret^{7}	5^{3}	6^{8}	2^{3 F}	5^{6}	8^{8}	19^{9}	2^{4}	11	Ret	11	4^{6}	10^{P 4}	204
8	(Italy) Luca Marini	Ducati	Mooney VR46 Racing Team	Ret	8^{3}	2^{7}	6	Ret^{4}	4^{5}	5^{4}	7	7	4	11	9^{7}	DNS		Ret^{P 2}	12	7^{3}	10^{9}	3^{P 3}	9	201
9	(Spain) Álex Márquez	Ducati	Gresini Racing MotoGP	5^{9}	3^{P 5}	Ret	8	Ret	Ret^{F}	7^{8}	6^{9}	Ret^{1}	5^{4}	6	11^{9}	DNS		DNS	9	Ret^{8}	2^{1 F}	6^{4}	6^{8}	177
10	(France) Fabio Quartararo	Yamaha	Monster Energy Yamaha MotoGP	8	7^{9}	3	10	7	11	13	Ret^{3}	15	8	7	13	3^{6}	10	3^{5}	14	5	5	7^{8}	11	172
11	(Australia) Jack Miller	KTM	Red Bull KTM Factory Racing	7^{4}	6	Ret^{9}	3^{3}	Ret	7^{6}	6^{3}	Ret	8^{7}	15^{5}	8	Ret	14^{7}	6^{4}	7^{9}	7	16	8^{6}	9	Ret	163
12	(Italy) Fabio Di Giannantonio	Ducati	Gresini Racing MotoGP	Ret	10	9	12	8	14	9	Ret	13	17	10	17	Ret	8^{8}	4^{6}	3	9	9	1^{2}	4^{6}	151
13	(Italy) Franco Morbidelli	Yamaha	Monster Energy Yamaha MotoGP	14	4^{4}	8	11	10	10	12	9	14	11^{9}	14	15	7	17	14	17	11	7	16	7	102
14	(Spain) Marc Márquez	Honda	Repsol Honda Team	Ret^{P 3}				Ret^{5}	Ret^{7}	DNS	DNS	Ret	12	13	7	9^{3}	3^{7}	Ret	15	6^{4}	13	11	Ret^{3}	96
15	(Italy) Enea Bastianini	Ducati	Ducati Lenovo Team	DNS			DNS		9^{9}	8	Ret^{8}	Ret	10	DNS^{9}				8^{7 F}	10	13	1^{4}	8^{F}	Ret	84
16	(Portugal) Miguel Oliveira	Aprilia	CryptoData RNF MotoGP Team	Ret^{7}		5^{8}	Ret^{5}		Ret	10	Ret	4	Ret	5^{6}	6	12	18	12	13	Ret	Ret	DNS		76
17	(Spain) Augusto Fernández	KTM	GasGas Factory Racing Tech3	13	11	10	13	4	15	11	10	11^{8}	14	9	16	Ret	7	Ret	Ret	17	14	15^{9}	Ret	71
18	(Japan) Takaaki Nakagami	Honda	LCR Honda Idemitsu	12	13	Ret	9	9	13	14	8	16	18	15	19	11	11	11	19	14	18	19	12	56
19	(Spain) Álex Rins	Honda	LCR Honda Castrol	10	9	1^{2 F}	Ret	Ret	DNS								WD	9	DNS				Ret	54
20	(Spain) Raúl Fernández	Aprilia	CryptoData RNF MotoGP Team	Ret	14	Ret	15	WD	17	15	12	10	Ret	Ret	8	10^{9}	9	13	16	15	Ret	17	5	51
21	(Spain) Dani Pedrosa	KTM	Red Bull KTM Factory Racing				7^{6}								4^{4}									32
22	(Spain) Joan Mir	Honda	Repsol Honda Team	11	DNS	Ret	Ret	Ret	DNS			Ret	Ret	17	Ret	5	12	Ret	Ret	12	Ret	14	DNS	26
23	(Spain) Pol Espargaró	KTM	GasGas Factory Racing Tech3	DNS								12	16^{6}	Ret	Ret	13	15	Ret	18	18	15	18	14	15
24	(Italy) Lorenzo Savadori	Aprilia	CryptoData RNF MotoGP Team					12															13	12
24	(Italy) Lorenzo Savadori	Aprilia	Aprilia Racing						18		11		19											12
25	(Germany) Jonas Folger	KTM	GasGas Factory Racing Tech3			12	17	13	19	17	14													9
26	(Germany) Stefan Bradl	Honda	Repsol Honda Team			Ret																		8
26	(Germany) Stefan Bradl	Honda	HRC Team				14								18									8
26	(Germany) Stefan Bradl	Honda	LCR Honda Castrol								13					15	14							8
27	(Italy) Michele Pirro	Ducati	Ducati Lenovo Team			11										16	16							5
27	(Italy) Michele Pirro	Ducati	Aruba.it Racing						16						Ret									5
28	(Italy) Danilo Petrucci	Ducati	Ducati Lenovo Team					11																5
29	(United Kingdom) Cal Crutchlow	Yamaha	Yamalube RS4GP Racing Team														13							3
30	(Spain) Iker Lecuona	Honda	Repsol Honda Team				16				Ret													0
30	(Spain) Iker Lecuona	Honda	LCR Honda Castrol									17	20	16							16	Ret		0
31	(Spain) Álvaro Bautista	Ducati	Aruba.it Racing																		17			0
	(Japan) Takumi Takahashi	Honda	LCR Honda Castrol												DNQ									0
Pos.	Rider	Bike	Team	POR (Portugal)	ARG (Argentina)	AME (United States)	SPA (Spain)	FRA (France)	ITA (Italy)	GER (Germany)	NED (Netherlands)	GBR (United Kingdom)	AUT (Austria)	CAT (Catalonia)	RSM (San Marino)	IND (India)	JPN (Japan)	INA (Indonesia)	AUS (Australia)	THA (Thailand)	MAL (Malaysia)	QAT (Qatar)	VAL (Valencian Community)	Pts

Race key
Colour	Result
Gold	Winner
Silver	2nd place
Bronze	3rd place
Green	Points finish
Blue	Non-points finish
Blue	Non-classified finish (NC)
Purple	Retired (Ret)
Red	Did not qualify (DNQ)
Black	Disqualified (DSQ)
White	Did not start (DNS)
White	Withdrew (WD)
White	Race cancelled (C)
Blank	Did not practice (DNP)
Blank	Excluded (EX)
Blank	Did not arrive (DNA)
Blank	Did not enter (empty cell)
Annotation	Meaning
P	Pole position
Superscript number	Points-scoring position in sprint race
F	Fastest lap
Rider key
Colour	Meaning
Light blue	Rookie rider

=== Constructors' standings ===
Each constructor was awarded the same number of points as their best placed rider in each race.

Pos.	Constructor	POR (Portugal)	ARG (Argentina)	AME (United States)	SPA (Spain)	FRA (France)	ITA (Italy)	GER (Germany)	NED (Netherlands)	GBR (United Kingdom)	AUT (Austria)	CAT (Catalonia)	RSM (San Marino)	IND (India)	JPN (Japan)	INA (Indonesia)	AUS (Australia)	THA (Thailand)	MAL (Malaysia)	QAT (Qatar)	VAL (Valencian Community)	Pts
1	(Italy) Ducati	1^{1}	1^{2}	2^{1}	1^{2}	1^{1}	1^{1}	1^{1}	1^{1}	2^{1}	1^{1}	3^{2}	1^{1}	1^{1}	1^{1}	1^{1}	1	1^{1}	1^{1}	1^{1}	1^{1}	700
2	(Austria) KTM	6^{4}	6^{1}	10^{5}	2^{1}	4^{2}	5^{6}	6^{3}	4^{5}	3^{7}	2^{2}	8^{4}	4^{4}	4^{4}	6^{2}	6^{9}	4	3^{2}	8^{5}	5^{7}	3^{2}	373
3	(Italy) Aprilia	2^{5}	12^{7}	4^{4}	5^{5}	5^{8}	6^{8}	10^{9}	3^{4}	1^{3}	6^{7}	1^{1}	5^{6}	8^{8}	5^{9}	2^{4}	8	8^{5}	11	4^{6}	5^{4}	326
4	(Japan) Yamaha	8	4^{4}	3	10	7	10	12	9^{3}	14	8^{9}	7	13	3^{6}	10	3^{5}	14	5	5	7^{8}	7	196
5	(Japan) Honda	10^{3}	9	1^{2}	9	9^{5}	13^{7}	14	8	16	12	13	7	5^{3}	3^{7}	9	15	6^{4}	13	11	12^{3}	185
Pos.	Constructor	POR (Portugal)	ARG (Argentina)	AME (United States)	SPA (Spain)	FRA (France)	ITA (Italy)	GER (Germany)	NED (Netherlands)	GBR (United Kingdom)	AUT (Austria)	CAT (Catalonia)	RSM (San Marino)	IND (India)	JPN (Japan)	INA (Indonesia)	AUS (Australia)	THA (Thailand)	MAL (Malaysia)	QAT (Qatar)	VAL (Valencian Community)	Pts

=== Teams' standings ===
The teams' standings were based on results obtained by regular and substitute riders; wild-card entries were ineligible.

Pos.	Team	Bike No.	POR (Portugal)	ARG (Argentina)	AME (United States)	SPA (Spain)	FRA (France)	ITA (Italy)	GER (Germany)	NED (Netherlands)	GBR (United Kingdom)	AUT (Austria)	CAT (Catalonia)	RSM (San Marino)	IND (India)	JPN (Japan)	INA (Indonesia)	AUS (Australia)	THA (Thailand)	MAL (Malaysia)	QAT (Qatar)	VAL (Valencian Community)	Pts
1	(Italy) Prima Pramac Racing	5	4^{8}	2	7	Ret^{8}	3^{6}	3^{4}	3^{5 F}	Ret	9^{4}	13	4^{7}	10	6	NC^{5 F}	Ret	1	10^{9}	12^{8}	12	2^{9}	653
1	(Italy) Prima Pramac Racing	89	Ret^{2}	5^{8}	Ret^{3}	4^{4}	2^{1}	2^{3}	1^{1}	5^{6 F}	6^{6}	7^{3}	3^{5}	1^{P 1}	2^{1}	1^{P 1}	Ret^{1}	5^{P F}	1^{P 1}	4^{2}	10^{1}	Ret^{1}	653
2	(Italy) Ducati Lenovo Team	1	1^{1}	16^{6}	Ret^{P 1}	1^{2 F}	Ret^{P 3}	1^{P 1}	2^{P 2}	1^{2}	2	1^{P 1 F}	DNS^{P 2}	3^{3 F}	Ret^{2}	2^{3}	1^{8}	2	2^{7}	3^{P 3}	2^{5}	1^{5}	561
2	(Italy) Ducati Lenovo Team	9					11																561
2	(Italy) Ducati Lenovo Team	23	DNS			DNS		9^{9}	8	Ret^{8}	Ret	10	DNS^{9}				8^{7 F}	10	13	1^{4}	8^{F}	Ret	561
2	(Italy) Ducati Lenovo Team	51			11										16	16							561
3	(Italy) Mooney VR46 Racing Team	10	Ret	8^{3}	2^{7}	6	Ret^{4}	4^{5}	5^{4}	7	7	4	11	9^{7}	DNS		Ret^{P 2}	12	7^{3}	10^{9}	3^{P 3}	9	530
3	(Italy) Mooney VR46 Racing Team	72	3	1^{2 F}	6^{6}	Ret^{9}	1^{7 F}	8^{2}	4^{7}	2^{P 1}	Ret^{P 2}	3	12^{8}	2^{2}	1^{P 5 F}	4^{6}	5^{3}	6	4^{6 F}	6^{7}	13	Ret^{7}	530
4	(Austria) Red Bull KTM Factory Racing	33	6	17^{1}	13^{5}	2^{1}	6^{2}	5	Ret^{6}	4^{5}	3^{9}	2^{2}	Ret^{4}	14^{5}	4^{4}	Ret^{2}	6	4	3^{2}	Ret^{5}	5^{7}	3^{2 F}	456
4	(Austria) Red Bull KTM Factory Racing	43	7^{4}	6	Ret^{9}	3^{3}	Ret	7^{6}	6^{3}	Ret	8^{7}	15^{5}	8	Ret	14^{7}	6^{4}	7^{9}	7	16	8^{6}	9	Ret	456
5	(Italy) Aprilia Racing	12	2^{5}	12^{7}	4	Ret^{7}	Ret^{9}	12	Ret	Ret^{7}	5^{3}	6^{7}	2^{3 F}	5^{6}	8^{8}	19^{9}	2^{4}	11	Ret	12	4^{6}	10^{P 4}	410
5	(Italy) Aprilia Racing	41	9^{6 F}	15	Ret^{4}	5^{P}	5^{8}	6^{8}	16^{9}	3^{4}	1^{5 F}	9^{8}	1^{1}	12^{8}	Ret	5	10	8	8^{5}	Ret	Ret	8	410
6	(Italy) Gresini Racing MotoGP	49	Ret	10	9	12	8	14	9	Ret	13	17	10	17	Ret	8^{8}	4^{6}	3	9	9	1^{2}	4^{6}	328
6	(Italy) Gresini Racing MotoGP	73	5^{9}	3^{P 5}	Ret	8	Ret	Ret^{F}	7^{8}	6^{9}	Ret^{1}	5^{4}	6	11^{9}	DNS		DNS	9	Ret^{8}	2^{1 F}	6^{4}	6^{8}	328
7	(Japan) Monster Energy Yamaha MotoGP	20	8	7^{9}	3	10	7	11	13	Ret^{3}	15	8	7	13	3^{6}	10	3^{5}	14	5	5	7^{8}	11	274
7	(Japan) Monster Energy Yamaha MotoGP	21	14	4^{4}	8	11	10	10	12	9	14	11^{9}	14	15	7	17	14	17	11	7	16	7	274
8	(Malaysia) CryptoData RNF MotoGP Team	25	Ret	14	Ret	15	WD	17	15	12	10	Ret	Ret	8	10^{9}	9	13	16	15	Ret	17	5	134
8	(Malaysia) CryptoData RNF MotoGP Team	32					12															13	134
8	(Malaysia) CryptoData RNF MotoGP Team	88	Ret^{7}		5^{8}	Ret^{5}		Ret	10	Ret	4	Ret	5^{6}	6	12	18	12	13	Ret	Ret	DNS		134
9	(Japan) Repsol Honda Team	6			Ret																		122
9	(Japan) Repsol Honda Team	27				16				Ret													122
9	(Japan) Repsol Honda Team	36	11	DNS	Ret	Ret	Ret	DNS			Ret	Ret	17	Ret	5	12	Ret	Ret	12	Ret	14	DNS	122
9	(Japan) Repsol Honda Team	93	Ret^{P 3}				Ret^{5}	Ret^{7}	DNS	DNS	Ret	12	13	7	9^{3}	3^{7}	Ret	15	6^{4}	13	11	Ret^{3}	122
10	(Monaco) LCR Honda	6								13					15	14							116
10	(Monaco) LCR Honda	7												DNQ									116
10	(Monaco) LCR Honda	27									17	20	16							16	Ret		116
10	(Monaco) LCR Honda	30	12	13	Ret	9	9	13	14	8	16	18	15	19	11	11	11	19	14	18	19	12	116
10	(Monaco) LCR Honda	42	10	9	1^{2 F}	Ret	Ret	DNS								WD	9	DNS				Ret	116
11	(France) GasGas Factory Racing Tech3	37	13	11	10	13	4	15	11	10	11^{8}	14	9	16	Ret	7	Ret	Ret	17	14	15^{9}	Ret	95
11	(France) GasGas Factory Racing Tech3	44	DNS								12	16^{6}	Ret	Ret	13	15	Ret	18	18	15	18	14	95
11	(France) GasGas Factory Racing Tech3	94			12	17	13	19	17	14													95
Pos.	Team	Bike No.	POR (Portugal)	ARG (Argentina)	AME (United States)	SPA (Spain)	FRA (France)	ITA (Italy)	GER (Germany)	NED (Netherlands)	GBR (United Kingdom)	AUT (Austria)	CAT (Catalonia)	RSM (San Marino)	IND (India)	JPN (Japan)	INA (Indonesia)	AUS (Australia)	THA (Thailand)	MAL (Malaysia)	QAT (Qatar)	VAL (Valencian Community)	Pts
