= 2023 Portuguese motorcycle Grand Prix =

Motorcycle races in Portimão

(Portugal) 2023 Portuguese Grand Prix
Race details
- Race 1 of 20 races in the 2023 Grand Prix motorcycle racing season
- Date: 26 March 2023
- Official name: Grande Prémio Tissot de Portugal
- Location: Autódromo Internacional do Algarve; Portimão, Algarve, Portugal
- Course: Permanent racing facility; 4.592 km (2.853 mi)

MotoGP
Pole position
Rider	(Spain) Marc Márquez	Honda
Time	1:37.226	
Fastest lap
Rider	(Spain) Aleix Espargaró	Aprilia
Time	1:38.872 on lap 9	
Podium
First	(Italy) Francesco Bagnaia	Ducati
Second	(Spain) Maverick Viñales	Aprilia
Third	(Italy) Marco Bezzecchi	Ducati

Moto2
Pole position
Rider	(Czech Republic) Filip Salač	Kalex
Time	1:42.323	
Fastest lap
Rider	(Spain) Pedro Acosta	Kalex
Time	1:42.525 on lap 5	
Podium
First	(Spain) Pedro Acosta	Kalex
Second	(Spain) Arón Canet	Kalex
Third	(Italy) Tony Arbolino	Kalex

Moto3
Pole position
Rider	(Japan) Ayumu Sasaki	Husqvarna
Time	1:46.798	
Fastest lap
Rider	(Turkey) Deniz Öncü	KTM
Time	1:47.563 on lap 19	
Podium
First	(Spain) Daniel Holgado	KTM
Second	(Spain) David Muñoz	KTM
Third	(Brazil) Diogo Moreira	KTM

The 2023 Portuguese motorcycle Grand Prix (officially known as the Grande Prémio Tissot de Portugal) was the first round of the 2023 Grand Prix motorcycle racing season. It was held at the Autódromo Internacional do Algarve in Portimão on 26 March 2023.

== Background ==
=== Riders' entries ===
At the Practice session in the MotoGP class, there were two red flags. The first was raised due to a power outage in the race control room. Then, the red flag flew again due to a severe accident that befell GasGas Tech3 Factory Racing rider Pol Espargaró. Based on information from MotoGP, Pol had an accident at turn 10. The GasGas Tech3 rider was rushed to hospital with back and chest trauma. Meanwhile, Ducati Lenovo rider Enea Bastianini was forced to pull over and did not participate in this race. He had to get on the operating table due to a fractured shoulder blade. Bastianini got this problem after an accident in the 2023 Portuguese MotoGP sprint race the day before. He fell after his motorbike was swept by Mooney VR46 Racing Team rider Luca Marini who slipped first.

In the Moto2 class, Idemitsu Honda Team Asia rider Ai Ogura was confirmed to miss the opening Moto2 series in Portugal. That's because Ogura is still recovering from an injury to his left wrist which was operated on a few weeks earlier. Meanwhile, Izan Guevara was also forced to miss the opening two races in his Moto2 debut due to a right wrist injury. In the Moto2 Portugal and Argentina series, Izan will be replaced by Jordi Torres. The reigning Moto3 champion crashed badly on the first day of the Moto2 private test at Jerez. Álex Escrig withdrew from this race. He initially attempted to perform in P1, but could not cope with the pain caused by his crash during the Jerez test. Forward Team has appointed David Sanchis as a temporary replacement.

== Practice session ==
=== MotoGP ===
==== Combined Practice 1-2 ====
The top ten riders (written in bold) qualified for Q2.

Fastest session lap

Pos.	No.	Biker	Constructor	Practice times	
Pos.	No.	Biker	Constructor	P1	P2
1	43	**(Australia) Jack Miller**	**KTM**	1:39.558	1:37.709
2	12	**(Spain) Maverick Viñales**	**Aprilia**	1:39.180	1:37.746
3	1	**(Italy) Francesco Bagnaia**	**Ducati**	1:39.475	1:37.856
4	10	**(Italy) Luca Marini**	**Ducati**	1:38.922	1:37.899
5	89	**(Spain) Jorge Martín**	**Ducati**	1:39.206	1:37.991
6	20	**(France) Fabio Quartararo**	**Yamaha**	1:39.281	1:38.015
7	5	**(France) Johann Zarco**	**Ducati**	1:39.068	1:38.112
8	72	**(Italy) Marco Bezzecchi**	**Ducati**	1:39.018	1:38.158
9	41	**(Spain) Aleix Espargaró**	**Aprilia**	1:39.552	1:38.253
10	23	**(Italy) Enea Bastianini**	**Ducati**	1:39.682	1:38.256
11	73	(Spain) Álex Márquez	Ducati	1:38.782	1:38.385
12	36	(Spain) Joan Mir	Honda	1:38.827	1:38.394
13	42	(Spain) Álex Rins	Honda	1:39.595	1:38.416
14	93	(Spain) Marc Márquez	Honda	1:39.537	1:38.419
15	30	(Japan) Takaaki Nakagami	Honda	1:40.059	1:38.827
16	37	(Spain) Augusto Fernández	KTM	1:40.203	1:38.882
17	25	(Spain) Raúl Fernández	Aprilia	1:39.894	1:38.904
18	33	(South Africa) Brad Binder	KTM	1:40.986	1:38.910
19	88	(Portugal) Miguel Oliveira	Aprilia	1:39.794	1:38.958
20	21	(Italy) Franco Morbidelli	Yamaha	1:39.629	1:38.978
21	49	(Italy) Fabio Di Giannantonio	Ducati	1:40.477	1:39.421
22	44	(Spain) Pol Espargaró	KTM	1:40.471	1:40.130
OFFICIAL MOTOGP COMBINED PRACTICE TIMES REPORT

==== Free practice ====
Pos.	No.	Biker	Constructor	
Pos.	No.	Biker	Constructor	Time results
1	72	(Italy) Marco Bezzecchi	Ducati	1:38.577
2	20	(France) Fabio Quartararo	Yamaha	1:38.726
3	41	(Spain) Aleix Espargaró	Aprilia	1:38.801
4	1	(Italy) Francesco Bagnaia	Ducati	1:38.803
5	88	(Portugal) Miguel Oliveira	Aprilia	1:38.862
6	73	(Spain) Álex Márquez	Ducati	1:38.865
7	12	(Spain) Maverick Viñales	Aprilia	1:38.869
8	89	(Spain) Jorge Martín	Ducati	1:38.995
9	36	(Spain) Joan Mir	Honda	1:39.017
10	23	(Italy) Enea Bastianini	Ducati	1:39.022
11	30	(Japan) Takaaki Nakagami	Honda	1:39.118
12	21	(Italy) Franco Morbidelli	Yamaha	1:39.132
13	43	(Australia) Jack Miller	KTM	1:39.166
14	5	(France) Johann Zarco	Ducati	1:39.183
15	10	(Italy) Luca Marini	Ducati	1:39.183
16	93	(Spain) Marc Márquez	Honda	1:39.231
17	25	(Spain) Raúl Fernández	Aprilia	1:39.268
18	42	(Spain) Álex Rins	Honda	1:39.298
19	49	(Italy) Fabio Di Giannantonio	Ducati	1:39.447
20	33	(South Africa) Brad Binder	KTM	1:39.479
21	37	(Spain) Augusto Fernández	KTM	1:39.537
OFFICIAL MOTOGP FREE PRACTICE TIMES REPORT

=== Moto2 ===
==== Combined Practice 1-2-3 ====
The top fourteen riders (written in bold) qualified for Q2.

Fastest session lap

Pos.	No.	Biker	Constructor	Free practice times		
Pos.	No.	Biker	Constructor	P1	P2	P3
1	40	**(Spain) Arón Canet**	**Kalex**	1:43.397	1:42.926	**1:42.003**
2	12	**(Czech Republic) Filip Salač**	**Kalex**	1:43.644	1:42.730	**1:42.089**
3	37	**(Spain) Pedro Acosta**	**Kalex**	1:43.051	1:42.391	**1:42.128**
4	21	**(Spain) Alonso López**	**Boscoscuro**	1:43.629	1:42.920	**1:42.146**
5	54	**(Spain)** **Fermín Aldeguer**	**Boscoscuro**	1:43.275	1:43.039	**1:42.174**
6	7	**(Belgium) Barry Baltus**	**Kalex**	1:43.970	1:43.293	**1:42.200**
7	18	**(Spain) Manuel González**	**Kalex**	1:43.225	1:42.825	**1:42.376**
8	96	**(United Kingdom)** **Jake Dixon**	**Kalex**	1:43.046	1:42.489	**1:42.438**
9	22	**(United Kingdom)** **Sam Lowes**	**Kalex**	1:43.329	1:42.762	**1:42.451**
10	13	**(Italy) Celestino Vietti**	**Kalex**	1:43.360	1:42.820	**1:42.510**
11	64	**(Netherlands) Bo Bendsneyder**	**Kalex**	1:43.771	1:42.979	**1:42.567**
12	11	**(Spain) Sergio García**	**Kalex**	1:44.211	1:44.243	**1:42.601**
13	35	**(Thailand) Somkiat Chantra**	**Kalex**	1:43.726	1:43.404	**1:42.613**
14	75	**(Spain) Albert Arenas**	**Kalex**	1:44.381	1:43.496	**1:42.654**
15	16	(United States) Joe Roberts	Kalex	1:44.906	1:43.393	**1:42.658**
16	14	(Italy) Tony Arbolino	Kalex	1:43.233	**1:42.760**	1:42.785
17	15	(South Africa) Darryn Binder	Kalex	1:44.619	1:43.466	**1:42.889**
18	52	(Spain) Jeremy Alcoba	Kalex	1:43.719	1:43.446	**1:42.907**
19	72	(Spain) Borja Gómez	Kalex	1:44.350	1:43.702	**1:42.947**
20	7	(Italy) Dennis Foggia	Kalex	1:45.556	1:43.902	**1:43.024**
21	84	(Netherlands) Zonta van den Goorbergh	Kalex	1:44.538	1:44.267	**1:43.183**
22	4	(United States) Sean Dylan Kelly	Kalex	1:44.885	1:43.528	**1:43.315**
23	42	(Spain) Marcos Ramírez	Forward	1:44.766	1:43.993	**1:43.541**
24	19	(Italy) Lorenzo Dalla Porta	Kalex	1:45.108	1:44.272	**1:43.591**
25	33	(United Kingdom) Rory Skinner	Kalex	1:44.643	1:44.329	**1:43.828**
26	3	(Germany) Lukas Tulovic	Kalex	1:45.311	**1:44.467**	NC
27	5	(Japan) Kohta Nozane	Kalex	1:45.425	1:45.008	**1:44.517**
28	81	(Spain) Jordi Torres	Kalex	1:47.847	1:45.476	**1:44.742**
29	98	(Spain) David Sanchis	Forward		1:46.089	**1:45.211**
	17	(Spain) Álex Escrig	Forward	NC		
Source : OFFICIAL MOTO2 COMBINED PRACTICE TIMES REPORT

=== Moto3 ===
==== Combined Practice 1-2-3 ====
The top fourteen riders (written in bold) qualified for Q2.

Fastest session lap

Pos.	No.	Biker	Constructor	Practice times		
Pos.	No.	Biker	Constructor	P1	P2	P3
1	48	(Spain) **Iván Ortolá**	**KTM**	1:49.103	1:47.705	**1:46.971**
2	99	**(Spain) José Antonio Rueda**	**KTM**	1:48.747	1:48.333	**1:47.070**
3	44	**(Spain) David Muñoz**	**KTM**	1:49.820	1:47.510	**1:47.072**
4	10	**(Brazil) Diogo Moreira**	**KTM**	1:48.006	1:47.470	**1:47.136**
5	96	**(Spain)** **Daniel Holgado**	**KTM**	1:48.305	1:47.320	**1:47.169**
6	11	**(Japan) Kaito Toba**	**Honda**	1:49.929	1:47.748	**1:47.216**
7	71	**(Japan) Ayumu Sasaki**	**Husqvarna**	1:49.009	1:47.665	**1:47.244**
8	5	**(Spain) Jaume Masià**	**Honda**	1:49.340	1:48.188	**1:47.253**
9	6	**(Japan) Ryusei Yamanaka**	**Gas Gas**	1:48.937	1:48.756	**1:47.338**
10	80	**(Colombia) David Alonso**	**Gas Gas**	1:48.400	1:48.640	**1:47.379**
11	82	(Italy) **Stefano Nepa**	**KTM**	1:48.897	1:48.116	**1:47.434**
12	66	**(Australia) Joel Kelso**	**CFMoto**	1:48.801	1:47.872	**1:47.436**
13	38	**(Spain) David Salvador**	**KTM**	1:48.940	1:48.700	**1:47.452**
14	53	**(Turkey)** **Deniz Öncü**	**KTM**	1:48.584	1:48.300	**1:47.542**
15	43	(Spain) Xavier Artigas	CFMoto	1:48.591	1:48.188	**1:47.559**
16	24	(Japan) Tatsuki Suzuki	Honda	1:48.941	1:48.245	**1:47.710**
17	54	(Italy) Riccardo Rossi	Honda	1:48.899	1:47.946	**1:47.726**
18	19	(United Kingdom) Scott Ogden	Honda	1:49.136	1:48.112	**1:47.806**
19	18	(Italy) Matteo Bertelle	Honda	1:49.223	1:49.138	**1:48.040**
20	7	(Italy) Filippo Farioli	KTM	1:49.390	1:49.177	**1:48.182**
21	95	(Netherlands) Collin Veijer	Husqvarna	1:48.991	1:49.128	**1:48.229**
22	64	(Indonesia) Mario Aji	Honda	1:49.104	1:48.461	**1:48.372**
23	55	(Italy) Romano Fenati	Honda	1:48.999	1:48.939	**1:48.609**
24	63	(Malaysia) Syarifuddin Azman	KTM	1:49.648	1:49.168	**1:48.621**
25	72	(Japan) Taiyo Furusato	Honda	1:51.007	**1:48.668**	1:48.912
26	70	(United Kingdom) Joshua Whatley	Honda	1:50.605	1:49.201	**1:48.757**
27	22	(Spain) Ana Carrasco	Honda	1:49.090	1:50.036	**1:48.936**
28	20	(France) Lorenzo Fellon	KTM	1:50.820	1:49.662	**1:49.471**
Source : OFFICIAL MOTO3 COMBINED PRACTICE TIMES REPORT

== Qualifying ==
=== MotoGP ===
Fastest session lap

Pos.	No.	Biker	Constructor	Qualifying times		Final grid	Row
Pos.	No.	Biker	Constructor	Q1	Q2	Final grid	Row
1	93	(Spain) Marc Márquez	Honda	1:37.675	1:37.226	1	1
2	1	(Italy) Francesco Bagnaia	Ducati	Qualified in Q2	1:37.290	2	1
3	89	(Spain) Jorge Martín	Ducati	Qualified in Q2	1:37.454	3	1
4	88	(Portugal) Miguel Oliveira	Aprilia	1:37.849	1:37.521	4	2
5	43	(Australia) Jack Miller	KTM	Qualified in Q2	1:37.549	5	2
6	23	(Italy) Enea Bastianini	Ducati	Qualified in Q2	1:37.584	6	2
7	12	(Spain) Maverick Viñales	Aprilia	Qualified in Q2	1:37.598	7	3
8	72	(Italy) Marco Bezzecchi	Ducati	Qualified in Q2	1:37.616	8	3
9	10	(Italy) Luca Marini	Ducati	Qualified in Q2	1:37.622	9	3
10	5	(France) Johann Zarco	Ducati	Qualified in Q2	1:37.880	10	4
11	20	(France) Fabio Quartararo	Yamaha	Qualified in Q2	1:37.920	11	4
12	41	(Spain) Aleix Espargaró	Aprilia	Qualified in Q2	1:38.136	12	4
13	73	(Spain) Álex Márquez	Ducati	1:37.970	N/A	13	5
14	36	(Spain) Joan Mir	Honda	1:38.064	N/A	14	5
15	33	(South Africa) Brad Binder	KTM	1:38.105	N/A	15	5
16	42	(Spain) Álex Rins	Honda	1:38.133	N/A	16	6
17	21	(Italy) Franco Morbidelli	Yamaha	1:38.335	N/A	17	6
18	30	(Japan) Takaaki Nakagami	Honda	1:38.439	N/A	18	6
19	37	(Spain) Augusto Fernández	KTM	1:38.464	N/A	19	7
20	25	(Spain) Raúl Fernández	Aprilia	1:38.492	N/A	20	7
21	49	(Italy) Fabio Di Giannantonio	Ducati	1:38.778	N/A	21	7
OFFICIAL MOTOGP QUALIFYING RESULTS

=== Moto2 ===
Fastest session lap

Pos.	No.	Biker	Constructor	Qualifying times		Final grid	Row
Pos.	No.	Biker	Constructor	Q1	Q2	Final grid	Row
1	12	(Czech Republic) Filip Salač	Kalex	Qualified in Q2	1:42.323	1	1
2	40	(Spain) Arón Canet	Kalex	Qualified in Q2	1:42.381	2	1
3	37	(Spain) Pedro Acosta	Kalex	Qualified in Q2	1:42.607	3	1
4	13	(Italy) Celestino Vietti	Kalex	Qualified in Q2	1:42.661	4	2
5	18	(Spain) Manuel González	Kalex	Qualified in Q2	1:42.728	5	2
6	52	(Spain) Jeremy Alcoba	Kalex	1:43.374	1:42.866	6	2
7	75	(Spain) Albert Arenas	Kalex	Qualified in Q2	1:42.867	7	3
8	14	(Italy) Tony Arbolino	Kalex	1:42.965	1:42.897	8	3
9	22	(United Kingdom) Sam Lowes	Kalex	Qualified in Q2	1:34.773	9	3
10	64	(Netherlands) Bo Bendsneyder	Kalex	Qualified in Q2	1:42.948	10	4
11	15	(South Africa) Darryn Binder	Kalex	1:43.386	1:43.041	11	4
12	96	(United Kingdom) Jake Dixon	Kalex	Qualified in Q2	1:43.062	12	4
13	35	(Thailand) Somkiat Chantra	Kalex	Qualified in Q2	1:43.120	13	5
14	21	(Spain) Alonso López	Boscoscuro	Qualified in Q2	1:43.144	14	5
15	7	(Belgium) Barry Baltus	Kalex	Qualified in Q2	1:43.271	15	5
16	54	(Spain) Fermín Aldeguer	Boscoscuro	Qualified in Q2	1:43.333	16	6
17	11	(Spain) Sergio García	Kalex	Qualified in Q2	1:43.374	17	6
18	84	(Netherlands) Zonta van den Goorbergh	Kalex	1:43.084	1:44.941	18	6
19	16	(United States) Joe Roberts	Kalex	1:43.462	N/A	19	7
20	72	(Spain) Borja Gómez	Kalex	1:43.540	N/A	20	7
21	19	(Italy) Lorenzo Dalla Porta	Kalex	1:43.672	N/A	21	7
22	42	(Spain) Marcos Ramírez	Forward	1:43.672	N/A	22	8
23	71	(Italy) Dennis Foggia	Kalex	1:43.906	N/A	23	8
24	4	(United States) Sean Dylan Kelly	Kalex	1:43.921	N/A	24	8
25	33	(United Kingdom) Rory Skinner	Kalex	1:44.517	N/A	25	9
26	81	(Spain) Jordi Torres	Kalex	1:45.632	N/A	26	9
27	98	(Spain) David Sanchis	Forward	1:45.892	N/A	27	9
NC	5	(Japan) Kohta Nozane	Kalex		N/A		10
OFFICIAL MOTO2 QUALIFYING RESULTS

=== Moto3 ===
Fastest session lap

Pos.	No.	Biker	Constructor	Qualifying times		Final grid	Row
Pos.	No.	Biker	Constructor	Q1	Q2	Final grid	Row
1	71	(Japan) Ayumu Sasaki	Husqvarna	Qualified in Q2	1:46.798	1	1
2	99	(Spain) José Antonio Rueda	KTM	Qualified in Q2	1:47.172	2	1
3	66	(Australia) Joel Kelso	CFMoto	Qualified in Q2	1:47.248	3	1
4	96	(Spain) Daniel Holgado	KTM	Qualified in Q2	1:47.412	4	2
5	48	(Spain) Iván Ortolá	KTM	Qualified in Q2	1:47.514	5	2
6	80	(Colombia) David Alonso	Gas Gas	Qualified in Q2	1:47.519	6	2
7	43	(Spain) Xavier Artigas	CFMoto	1:47.694	1:47.531	7	3
8	53	(Turkey) Deniz Öncü	KTM	Qualified in Q2	1:47.561	8	3
9	5	(Spain) Jaume Masià	Honda	Qualified in Q2	1:47.580	9	3
10	82	(Italy) Stefano Nepa	KTM	Qualified in Q2	1:47.589	10	4
11	27	(Japan) Kaito Toba	Honda	Qualified in Q2	1:47.606	11	4
12	54	(Italy) Riccardo Rossi	Honda	1:48.092	1:47,606	12	4
13	44	(Spain) David Muñoz	KTM	Qualified in Q2	1:47.628	13	5
14	95	(Netherlands) Collin Veijer	Husqvarna	1:47.913	1:47.854	14	5
15	24	(Japan) Tatsuki Suzuki	KTM	1:47.894	1:47.892	15	5
16	10	(Brazil) Diogo Moreira	KTM	Qualified in Q2	1:48.046	16	6
17	6	(Japan) Ryusei Yamanaka	Gas Gas	Qualified in Q2	1:48.200	17	6
18	38	(Spain) David Salvador	KTM	Qualified in Q2	1:48.388	18	6
19	18	(Italy) Matteo Bertelle	Honda	1:48.206	N/A	19	7
20	19	(United Kingdom) Scott Ogden	Honda	1:48.293	N/A	20	7
21	7	(Italy) Filippo Farioli	KTM	1:48.614	N/A	21	7
22	64	(Indonesia) Mario Aji	Honda	1:48.687	N/A	22	8
23	63	(Malaysia) Syarifuddin Azman	KTM	1:48.729	N/A	23	8
24	70	(United Kingdom) Joshua Whatley	Honda	1:48.731	N/A	24	8
25	55	(Italy) Romano Fenati	Honda	1:48.834	N/A	25	9
26	72	(Japan) Taiyo Furusato	Honda	1:49.271	N/A	26	9
27	22	(Spain) Ana Carrasco	KTM	1:49.379	N/A	27	9
28	20	(France) Lorenzo Fellon	KTM	1:50.055	N/A	28	10
OFFICIAL MOTO3 QUALIFYING RESULTS

== MotoGP Sprint ==
The MotoGP Sprint was held on 25 March.

Pos.	No.	Rider	Team	Manufacturer	Laps	Time/Retired	Grid	Points
1	1	(Italy) Francesco Bagnaia	Ducati Lenovo Team	Ducati	12	19:52.862	2	12
2	89	(Spain) Jorge Martín	Prima Pramac Racing	Ducati	12	+0.307	3	9
3	93	(Spain) Marc Márquez	Repsol Honda Team	Honda	12	+1.517	1	7
4	43	(Australia) Jack Miller	Red Bull KTM Factory Racing	KTM	12	+1.603	5	6
5	12	(Spain) Maverick Viñales	Aprilia Racing	Aprilia	12	+1.854	7	5
6	41	(Spain) Aleix Espargaró	Aprilia Racing	Aprilia	12	+2.106	12	4
7	88	(Portugal) Miguel Oliveira	CryptoData RNF MotoGP Team	Aprilia	12	+2.940	4	3
8	5	(France) Johann Zarco	Prima Pramac Racing	Ducati	12	+5.595	10	2
9	73	(Spain) Álex Márquez	Gresini Racing MotoGP	Ducati	12	+5.711	13	1
10	20	(France) Fabio Quartararo	Monster Energy Yamaha MotoGP	Yamaha	12	+5.924	11	
11	25	(Spain) Raúl Fernández	CryptoData RNF MotoGP Team	Aprilia	12	+8.160	20	
12	33	(South Africa) Brad Binder	Red Bull KTM Factory Racing	KTM	12	+8.384	15	
13	42	(Spain) Álex Rins	LCR Honda Castrol	Honda	12	+11.288	16	
14	21	(Italy) Franco Morbidelli	Monster Energy Yamaha MotoGP	Yamaha	12	+17.138	17	
15	30	(Japan) Takaaki Nakagami	LCR Honda Idemitsu	Honda	12	+18.128	18	
16	49	(Italy) Fabio Di Giannantonio	Gresini Racing MotoGP	Ducati	12	+21.235	21	
Ret	72	(Italy) Marco Bezzecchi	Mooney VR46 Racing Team	Ducati	2	Accident	8	
Ret	23	(Italy) Enea Bastianini	Ducati Lenovo Team	Ducati	1	Collision	6	
Ret	10	(Italy) Luca Marini	Mooney VR46 Racing Team	Ducati	1	Collision	9	
Ret	36	(Spain) Joan Mir	Repsol Honda Team	Honda	0	Accident	14	
Ret	37	(Spain) Augusto Fernández	GasGas Factory Racing Tech3	KTM	0	Accident	19	
DNS	44	(Spain) Pol Espargaró	GasGas Factory Racing Tech3	KTM		Did not start		
Fastest sprint lap: (Australia) Jack Miller (KTM) – 1:38.539 (lap 3)
OFFICIAL MOTOGP SPRINT REPORT

- Pol Espargaró suffered an injury in a crash during practice and was declared unfit to compete.

== Warm up practice ==
=== MotoGP ===
Álex Márquez set the best time 1:38.719 and was the fastest rider at this session ahead of Fabio Quartararo and Marc Márquez.

== Race ==
=== MotoGP ===
Pos.	No.	Rider	Team	Manufacturer	Laps	Time/Retired	Grid	Points
1	1	(Italy) Francesco Bagnaia	Ducati Lenovo Team	Ducati	25	41:25.401	2	25
2	12	(Spain) Maverick Viñales	Aprilia Racing	Aprilia	25	+0.687	7	20
3	72	(Italy) Marco Bezzecchi	Mooney VR46 Racing Team	Ducati	25	+2.726	8	16
4	5	(France) Johann Zarco	Prima Pramac Racing	Ducati	25	+8.060	10	13
5	73	(Spain) Álex Márquez	Gresini Racing MotoGP	Ducati	25	+8.125	13	11
6	33	(South Africa) Brad Binder	Red Bull KTM Factory Racing	KTM	25	+8.247	15	10
7	43	(Australia) Jack Miller	Red Bull KTM Factory Racing	KTM	25	+8.381	5	9
8	20	(France) Fabio Quartararo	Monster Energy Yamaha MotoGP	Yamaha	25	+8.543	11	8
9	41	(Spain) Aleix Espargaró	Aprilia Racing	Aprilia	25	+9.294	12	7
10	42	(Spain) Álex Rins	LCR Honda Castrol	Honda	25	+11.591	16	6
11	36	(Spain) Joan Mir	Repsol Honda Team	Honda	25	+16.992	14	5
12	30	(Japan) Takaaki Nakagami	LCR Honda Idemitsu	Honda	25	+17.448	18	4
13	37	(Spain) Augusto Fernández	GasGas Factory Racing Tech3	KTM	25	+21.723	19	3
14	21	(Italy) Franco Morbidelli	Monster Energy Yamaha MotoGP	Yamaha	25	+27.050	17	2
Ret	25	(Spain) Raúl Fernández	CryptoData RNF MotoGP Team	Aprilia	23	Accident	20	
Ret	10	(Italy) Luca Marini	Mooney VR46 Racing Team	Ducati	21	Accident	9	
Ret	89	(Spain) Jorge Martín	Prima Pramac Racing	Ducati	19	Accident	3	
Ret	49	(Italy) Fabio Di Giannantonio	Gresini Racing MotoGP	Ducati	10	Forearm Pain	21	
Ret	88	(Portugal) Miguel Oliveira	CryptoData RNF MotoGP Team	Aprilia	2	Collision	4	
Ret	93	(Spain) Marc Márquez	Repsol Honda Team	Honda	2	Collision	1	
DNS	23	(Italy) Enea Bastianini	Ducati Lenovo Team	Ducati		Did not start	6	
DNS	44	(Spain) Pol Espargaró	GasGas Factory Racing Tech3	KTM		Did not start		
Fastest lap: (Spain) Aleix Espargaró (Aprilia) – 1:38.872 (lap 9)
OFFICIAL MOTOGP RACE REPORT

- Pol Espargaró suffered an injury in a crash during practice and was declared unfit to compete.
- Enea Bastianini suffered an injury in a crash during sprint and was declared unfit to compete.

=== Moto2 ===
Pos.	No.	Biker	Constructor	Laps	Time/Retired	Grid	Points
1	37	(Spain) Pedro Acosta	Kalex	21	36:04.193	3	25
2	40	(Spain) Arón Canet	Kalex	21	+1.358	2	20
3	14	(Italy) Tony Arbolino	Kalex	21	+4.460	8	16
4	12	(Czech Republic) Filip Salač	Kalex	21	+7.110	1	13
5	18	(Spain) Manuel González	Kalex	21	+8.193	5	11
6	96	(United Kingdom) Jake Dixon	Kalex	21	+9.146	12	10
7	22	(United Kingdom) Sam Lowes	Kalex	21	+9.649	9	9
8	75	(Spain) Albert Arenas	Kalex	21	+12.270	7	8
9	35	(Thailand) Somkiat Chantra	Kalex	21	+13.941	13	7
10 (Note: One-position penalty for exceeding track limits on the last lap.)	52	(Spain) Jeremy Alcoba	Kalex	21	+13.840	6	6
11	13	(Italy) Celestino Vietti	Kalex	21	+14.086	4	5
12	7	(Belgium) Barry Baltus	Kalex	21	+14.515	15	4
13	54	(Spain) Fermín Aldeguer	Boscoscuro	21	+15.445	16	3
14	16	(United States) Joe Roberts	Kalex	21	+25.444	19	2
15	11	(Spain) Sergio García	Kalex	21	+26.876	17	1
16	15	(South Africa) Darryn Binder	Kalex	21	+40.233	11	
17	72	(Spain) Borja Gómez	Kalex	21	+41.710	20	
18	71	(Italy) Dennis Foggia	Kalex	21	+41.806	23	
19	19	(Italy) Lorenzo Dalla Porta	Kalex	21	+42.116	21	
20	4	(United States) Sean Dylan Kelly	Kalex	21	+42.141	24	
21	24	(Spain) Marcos Ramírez	Forward	21	+44.802	22	
22	33	(United Kingdom) Rory Skinner	Kalex	21	+45.630	25	
23	81	(Spain) Jordi Torres	Kalex	21	+1:02.643	26	
Ret	21	(Spain) Alonso López	Boscoscuro	15	Accident	14	
Ret	84	(Netherlands) Zonta van den Goorbergh	Kalex	14	Illness	18	
Ret	98	(Spain) David Sanchis	Forward	5	Mechanical	27	
Ret	64	(Netherlands) Bo Bendsneyder	Kalex	1	Accident	10	
DNS	3	(Germany) Lukas Tulovic	Kalex		Did not start		
DNS	5	(Japan) Kohta Nozane	Kalex		Did not start		
WD	17	(Spain) Álex Escrig	Forward		Withdrew		
Fastest lap: (Spain) Pedro Acosta (Kalex) – 1:42.525 (lap 5)
OFFICIAL MOTO2 RACE REPORT

=== Moto3 ===
Pos.	No.	Biker	Constructor	Laps	Time/Retired	Grid	Points
1	96	(Spain) Daniel Holgado	KTM	19	34:27.061	4	25
2	44	(Spain) David Muñoz	KTM	19	+0.160	13	20
3	10	(Brazil) Diogo Moreira	KTM	19	+0.175	16	16
4	99	(Spain) José Antonio Rueda	KTM	19	+0.206	2	13
5	5	(Spain) Jaume Masià	Honda	19	+0.233	9	11
6	71	(Japan) Ayumu Sasaki	Husqvarna	19	+1.090	1	10
7	82	(Italy) Stefano Nepa	KTM	19	+1.125	10	9
8	43	(Spain) Xavier Artigas	CFMoto	19	+1.137	7	8
9	66	(Australia) Joel Kelso	CFMoto	19	+1.268	3	7
10	53	(Turkey) Deniz Öncü	KTM	19	+1.409	8	6
11	27	(Japan) Kaito Toba	Honda	19	+2.852	11	5
12	95	(Netherlands) Collin Veijer	Husqvarna	19	+6.904	14	4
13	38	(Spain) David Salvador	KTM	19	+6.931	18	3
14	24	(Japan) Tatsuki Suzuki	Honda	19	+9.722	15	2
15	54	(Italy) Riccardo Rossi	Honda	19	+9.748	12	1
16	6	(Japan) Ryusei Yamanaka	Gas Gas	19	+9.771	17	
17	18	(Italy) Matteo Bertelle	Honda	19	+19.803	19	
18	64	(Indonesia) Mario Aji	Honda	19	+20.317	22	
19	55	(Italy) Romano Fenati	Honda	19	+29.900	25	
20	72	(Japan) Taiyo Furusato	Honda	19	+29.948	26	
21	70	(United Kingdom) Joshua Whatley	Honda	19	+29.904	24	
22	63	(Malaysia) Syarifuddin Azman	KTM	19	+29.969	23	
23	22	(Spain) Ana Carrasco	KTM	19	+30.066	27	
Ret	48	(Spain) Iván Ortolá	KTM	18	Accident	5	
Ret	80	(Colombia) David Alonso	Gas Gas	13	Accident Damage	6	
Ret	7	(Italy) Filippo Farioli	KTM	5	Accident Damage	21	
Ret	19	(United Kingdom) Scott Ogden	Honda	0	Accident	20	
DNS	20	(France) Lorenzo Fellon	KTM		Did not start	28	
Fastest lap: (Turkey) Deniz Öncü (KTM) – 1:47.563 (lap 19)
OFFICIAL MOTO3 RACE REPORT

- Lorenzo Fellon did not start after an injury sustained on the warm-up lap.

== Championship standings after the race ==
Below are the standings for the top five riders, constructors, and teams after the round.

=== MotoGP ===
Riders' Championship standings

Pos.	Rider	Points
1	(Italy) Francesco Bagnaia	37
2	(Spain) Maverick Viñales	25
3	(Italy) Marco Bezzecchi	16
4	(France) Johann Zarco	15
5	(Australia) Jack Miller	15

Constructors' Championship standings

Pos.	Constructor	Points
1	(Italy) Ducati	37
2	(Italy) Aprilia	25
3	(Austria) KTM	16
4	(Japan) Honda	13
5	(Japan) Yamaha	8

Teams' Championship standings

Pos.	Team	Points
1	(Italy) Ducati Lenovo Team	37
2	(Italy) Aprilia Racing	36
3	(Austria) Red Bull KTM Factory Racing	25
4	(Italy) Prima Pramac Racing	24
5	(Italy) Mooney VR46 Racing Team	16

=== Moto2 ===
Riders' Championship standings

Pos.	Rider	Points
1	(Spain) Pedro Acosta	25
2	(Spain) Arón Canet	20
3	(Italy) Tony Arbolino	16
4	(Czech Republic) Filip Salač	13
5	(Spain) Manuel González	11

Constructors' Championship standings

Pos.	Constructor	Points
1	(Germany) Kalex	25
2	(Italy) Boscoscuro	3

Teams' Championship standings

Pos.	Team	Points
1	(Finland) Red Bull KTM Ajo	33
2	(Belgium) Elf Marc VDS Racing Team	25
3	(Spain) Pons Wegow Los40	21
4	(Italy) QJmotor Gresini Moto2	19
5	(Italy) Correos Prepago Yamaha VR46 Master Camp	11

=== Moto3 ===
Riders' Championship standings

Pos.	Rider	Points
1	(Spain) Daniel Holgado	25
2	(Spain) David Muñoz	20
3	(Brazil) Diogo Moreira	16
4	(Spain) José Antonio Rueda	13
5	(Spain) Jaume Masià	11

Constructors' Championship standings

Pos.	Constructor	Points
1	(Austria) KTM	25
2	(Japan) Honda	11
3	(Sweden) Husqvarna	10
4	(China) CFMoto	8

Teams' Championship standings

Pos.	Team	Points
1	(France) Red Bull KTM Tech3	25
2	(Spain) Boé Motorsports	20
3	(Finland) Red Bull KTM Ajo	19
4	(Spain) MT Helmets – MSi	16
5	(Germany) CFMoto Racing Prüstel GP	15

== Notes ==
Previous race: 2022 Valencian Grand Prix	FIM Grand Prix World Championship; 2023 season	Next race: 2023 Argentine Grand Prix
Previous race: 2022 Portuguese Grand Prix	Portuguese motorcycle Grand Prix	Next race: 2024 Portuguese Grand Prix
