= 2023 Australian motorcycle Grand Prix =

Motorcycle races in Phillip Island

(Australia) 2023 Australian Grand Prix
Race details
- Race 16 of 20 races in the 2023 Grand Prix motorcycle racing season
- Date: 21–22 October 2023
- Official name: MotoGP Guru by Gryfyn Australian Motorcycle Grand Prix
- Location: Phillip Island Grand Prix Circuit; Phillip Island, Victoria, Australia
- Course: Permanent racing facility; 4.448 km (2.764 mi)

MotoGP
Pole position
Rider	(Spain) Jorge Martín	Ducati
Time	1:27.246	
Fastest lap
Rider	(Spain) Jorge Martín	Ducati
Time	1:28.823 on lap 3	
Podium
First	(France) Johann Zarco	Ducati
Second	(Italy) Francesco Bagnaia	Ducati
Third	(Italy) Fabio Di Giannantonio	Ducati

Moto2
Pole position
Rider	(Spain) Fermín Aldeguer	Boscoscuro
Time	1:31.888	
Fastest lap
Rider	(Italy) Tony Arbolino	Kalex
Time	1:45.698 on lap 4	
Podium
First	(Italy) Tony Arbolino	Kalex
Second	(Spain) Arón Canet	Kalex
Third	(Spain) Fermín Aldeguer	Boscoscuro

Moto3
Pole position
Rider	(Japan) Ayumu Sasaki	Husqvarna
Time	1:36.539	
Fastest lap
Rider	(Turkey) Deniz Öncü	KTM
Time	1:51.997 on lap 16	
Podium
First	(Turkey) Deniz Öncü	KTM
Second	(Japan) Ayumu Sasaki	Husqvarna
Third	(Australia) Joel Kelso	CFMoto

The 2023 Australian motorcycle Grand Prix (officially known as the MotoGP Guru by Gryfyn Australian Motorcycle Grand Prix) was the sixteenth round of the 2023 Grand Prix motorcycle racing season. It was held at the Phillip Island Grand Prix Circuit in Phillip Island on 21–22 October 2023.

== Background ==
Due to inclement weather forecast on 22 October, the schedule for the MotoGP sprint and main race was swapped, with the main race being held on 21 October, while the sprint was scheduled to be held on 22 October. For the first time since the 2015 Dutch TT, the MotoGP race was held on Saturday. Both the Moto2 and Moto3 were held on 22 October, with both classes having a warm up session introduced. All races on 22 October also started an hour earlier than planned to avoid the inclement weather.

=== Championship standings before the race ===
==== MotoGP ====
Coming into the weekend, Francesco Bagnaia leads the Riders' Championship by 18 points from Jorge Martín, with Marco Bezzecchi third, a further 45 points behind. Ducati, having secured the 5th title at the Indonesian Grand Prix, leads the Constructors' Championship over KTM by 244 points and Aprilia by a further 17 points.

== Practice session ==
=== MotoGP ===
==== Combined Free Practice 1-2 ====
Free Practice sessions on Friday and Saturday do not determine riders to qualify for Q2.

Fastest session lap

Pos.	No.	Biker	Constructor	Free practice times	
Pos.	No.	Biker	Constructor	FP1	FP2
1	89	(Spain) Jorge Martín	Ducati	**1:29.039**	1:29.299
2	93	(Spain) Marc Márquez	Honda	1:30.614	**1:29.412**
3	41	(Spain) Aleix Espargaró	Aprilia	1:30.480	**1:29.599**
4	1	(Italy) Francesco Bagnaia	Ducati	1:30.518	**1:29.685**
5	5	(France) Johann Zarco	Ducati	1:30.311	**1:29.745**
6	37	(Spain) Augusto Fernández	KTM	**1:29.759**	1:30.159
7	12	(Spain) Maverick Viñales	Aprilia	**1:29.777**	1:29.810
8	20	(France) Fabio Quartararo	Yamaha	1:30.858	**1:29.826**
9	25	(Spain) Raúl Fernández	Aprilia	1:30.753	**1:39.949**
10	73	(Spain) Álex Márquez	Ducati	1:30.434	**1:29.986**
11	44	(Spain) Pol Espargaró	KTM	1:30.675	**1:30.034**
12	33	(South Africa) Brad Binder	KTM	1:30.285	**1:30.092**
13	36	(Spain) Joan Mir	Honda	1:30.972	**1:30.250**
14	10	(Italy) Luca Marini	Ducati	1:31.332	**1:30.268**
15	23	(Italy) Enea Bastianini	Ducati	1:30.464	**1:30.303**
16	72	(Italy) Marco Bezzecchi	Ducati	1:30.434	**1:30.310**
17	49	(Italy) Fabio Di Giannantonio	Ducati	1:30.819	**1:30.341**
18	43	(Australia) Jack Miller	KTM	1:30.453	**1:30.365**
19	88	(Portugal) Miguel Oliveira	Aprilia	1:31.163	**1:30.494**
20	42	(Spain) Álex Rins	Honda	**1:30.678**	
21	30	(Japan) Takaaki Nakagami	Honda	1:30.834	**1:30.783**
22	21	(Italy) Franco Morbidelli	Yamaha	**1:30.940**	1:31.051
OFFICIAL MOTOGP COMBINED FREE PRACTICE TIMES REPORT

==== Practice ====
The top ten riders (written in bold) qualified for Q2.

Pos.	No.	Biker	Constructor	
Pos.	No.	Biker	Constructor	Time results
1	33	**(South Africa) Brad Binder**	**KTM**	**1:27.943**
2	43	**(Australia) Jack Miller**	**KTM**	**1:28.091**
3	12	**(Spain) Maverick Viñales**	**Aprilia**	**1:28.212**
4	89	**(Spain) Jorge Martín**	**Ducati**	**1:28.222**
5	44	**(Spain) Pol Espargaró**	**KTM**	**1:28.363**
6	72	**(Italy) Marco Bezzecchi**	**Ducati**	**1:28.368**
7	49	**(Italy) Fabio Di Giannantonio**	**Ducati**	**1:28.452**
8	23	**(Italy) Enea Bastianini**	**Ducati**	**1:28.453**
9	41	**(Spain) Aleix Espargaró**	**Aprilia**	**1:28.456**
10	5	**(France) Johann Zarco**	**Ducati**	**1:28.456**
11	1	(Italy) Francesco Bagnaia	Ducati	1:28.642
12	42	(Spain) Álex Rins	Honda	1:28.644
13	37	(Spain) Augusto Fernández	KTM	1:28.656
14	25	(Spain) Raúl Fernández	Aprilia	1:28.659
15	73	(Spain) Álex Márquez	Ducati	1:28.661
16	93	(Spain) Marc Márquez	Honda	1:28.790
17	20	(France) Fabio Quartararo	Yamaha	1:28.937
18	36	(Spain) Joan Mir	Honda	1:29.007
19	10	(Italy) Luca Marini	Ducati	1:29.164
20	88	(Portugal) Miguel Oliveira	Aprilia	1:29.711
21	30	(Japan) Takaaki Nakagami	Honda	1:29.750
22	21	(Italy) Franco Morbidelli	Yamaha	1:29.908
OFFICIAL MOTOGP PRACTICE TIMES REPORT

=== Moto2 ===
==== Combined Practice 1-2-3 ====
The top fourteen riders (written in bold) qualified for Q2.

Fastest session lap

Pos.	No.	Biker	Constructor	Free practice times		
Pos.	No.	Biker	Constructor	P1	P2	P3
1	54	**(Spain) Fermín Aldeguer**	**Boscoscuro**	1:32.794	1:32.548	**1:32.128**
2	16	**(United States) Joe Roberts**	**Kalex**	1.33.572	1:33.335	**1:32.578**
3	40	**(Spain) Arón Canet**	**Kalex**	1:33.238	**1:32.686**	1:33.035
4	11	**(Spain) Sergio García**	**Kalex**	1:34.838	1:33.472	**1:32.708**
5	37	**(Spain) Pedro Acosta**	**Kalex**	1:33.003	1:33.144	**1:32.825**
6	14	**(Italy) Tony Arbolino**	**Kalex**	1:33.925	1:33.749	**1:32.979**
7	22	**(United Kingdom) Sam Lowes**	**Kalex**	1:34.279	1:33.574	**1:32.991**
8	96	**(United Kingdom) Jake Dixon**	**Kalex**	1:33.913	**1:33,098**	1:33.295
9	18	**(Spain) Manuel González**	**Kalex**	1:34.893	**1:33.180**	1:33.275
10	75	**(Spain) Albert Arenas**	**Kalex**	1:34.395	1:34.185	**1:33.234**
11	42	**(Spain) Marcos Ramírez**	**Kalex**	1:33.981	1:33.793	**1:33.286**
12	21	**(Spain) Alonso López**	**Boscoscuro**	1:33.857	1:33.553	**1:33.413**
13	35	**(Thailand) Somkiat Chantra**	**Kalex**	1:35.171	**1:33.450**	1:35.016
14	15	**(South Africa) Darryn Binder**	**Kalex**	1:34.552	1:33.910	**1:33.456**
15	7	(Belgium) Barry Baltus	Kalex	1:34.200	1:34.295	**1:33.514**
16	84	(Netherlands) Zonta van den Goorbergh	Kalex	1:35.054	1:33.965	**1:33.585**
17	52	(Spain) Jeremy Alcoba	Kalex	1:34.136	1:34.055	**1:33.592**
18	79	(Japan) Ai Ogura	Kalex	1:34.492	1:33.952	**1:33.631**
19	28	(Spain) Izan Guevara	Kalex	1:34.273	**1:33.696**	1:34.381
20	3	(Germany) Lukas Tulovic	Kalex	1:34.954	1:34.280	**1:33.827**
21	64	(Netherlands) Bo Bendsneyder	Kalex	**1:33.865**	1:34.729	1:34.605
22	13	(Italy) Celestino Vietti	Kalex	1:34.211	1:34.114	**1:33.972**
23	71	(Italy) Dennis Foggia	Kalex	1:34.542	**1:34.065**	1:34.097
24	33	(United Kingdom) Rory Skinner	Kalex	1:36.066	1:34.587	**1:34.086**
25	23	(Japan) Taiga Hada	Kalex	1:35.353	1:34.581	**1:34.347**
26	12	(Czech Republic) Filip Salač	Kalex	1:34.397	1:34.427	**1:34.387**
27	67	(Italy) Alberto Surra	Forward	1:34.712	1:34.966	**1:34.659**
28	9	(Italy) Mattia Casadei	Kalex	1:36.456	1:35.476	**1:34.809**
29	17	(Spain) Álex Escrig	Forward	1:35.924	**1:34.945**	1:34.999
30	5	(Japan) Kohta Nozane	Kalex	1:37.017	**1:35.180**	1:35.480
Source : OFFICIAL MOTO2 COMBINED PRACTICE TIMES REPORT

=== Moto3 ===
==== Combined Practice 1-2-3 ====
The top fourteen riders (written in bold) qualified for Q2.

Fastest session lap

Pos.	No.	Biker	Constructor	Practice times		
Pos.	No.	Biker	Constructor	P1	P2	P3
1	71	(Japan) **Ayumu Sasaki**	**Husqvarna**	1:37.903	1:37.715	**1:36.403**
2	53	**(Turkey) Deniz Öncü**	**KTM**	1:38.613	1:37.146	**1:36.537**
3	66	**(Australia) Joel Kelso**	**CFMoto**	1:38.264	1:37.423	**1:36.566**
4	31	(Spain) **Adrián Fernández**	**KTM**	1:38.119	1:38.406	**1:36.786**
5	44	**(Spain)** **David Muñoz**	**KTM**	1:37.638	**1:36.791**	1:36.816
6	82	(Italy) **Stefano Nepa**	**KTM**	1:38.690	**1:36.864**	1:37.174
7	27	**(Japan) Kaito Toba**	**Honda**	1:40.298	1:37.926	**1:36.935**
8	95	**(Netherlands) Collin Veijer**	**Husqvarna**	1:38.684	1:37.765	**1:36.977**
9	80	**(Colombia) David Alonso**	**Gas Gas**	1:40.361	1:37.916	**1:37.071**
10	5	**(Spain) Jaume Masià**	**Honda**	1:38.152	1:37.337	**1:37.081**
11	10	(Brazil) **Diogo Moreira**	**KTM**	1:38.150	**1:37.111**	1:37.183
12	54	**(Italy) Riccardo Rossi**	**Honda**	1:38.034	1:38.374	**1:37.163**
13	18	**(Italy) Matteo Bertelle**	**KTM**	1:42.632	1:38.413	**1:37.286**
14	21	**(Spain)** **Vicente Pérez**	**KTM**	1:38.807	1:37.992	**1:37.383**
15	48	(Spain) Iván Ortolá	KTM	1:38.969	**1:37.411**	1:39.661
16	72	(Japan) Taiyo Furusato	Honda	1:40.648	1:38.029	**1:37.552**
17	70	(United Kingdom) Joshua Whatley	Honda	1:39.315	**1:37.554**	1:37.703
18	96	(Spain) Daniel Holgado	KTM	1:38.475	**1:37.623**	1:38.146
19	64	(Indonesia) Mario Aji	Honda	1:39.265	1:38.485	**1:37.674**
20	38	(Spain) David Salvador	KTM	1:39.314	1:37.864	**1:37.713**
21	6	(Japan) Ryusei Yamanaka	Gas Gas	1:38.447	1:38.210	**1:37.738**
22	7	(Italy) Filippo Farioli	KTM	1:39.727	1:38.064	**1:37.902**
23	9	(Italy) Nicola Carraro	Honda	1:39.116	1:38.369	**1:37.922**
24	99	(Spain) José Antonio Rueda	KTM	1:38.574	**1:38.005**	1:38.454
25	20	(France) Lorenzo Fellon	KTM	1:39.549	1:38.695	**1:38.105**
26	63	(Malaysia) Syarifuddin Azman	KTM	1:39.529	1:39.243	**1:38.106**
27	43	(Spain) Xavier Artigas	CFMoto	1:39.639	1:39.000	**1:38.866**
105% time:				1:42.519	1:41.631	1:41.223
DNQ	19	(United Kingdom) Scott Ogden	Honda	1:46.460	NC	**1:42.487**
Source : OFFICIAL MOTO3 COMBINED PRACTICE TIMES REPORT

== Qualifying ==
=== MotoGP ===
Fastest session lap

Pos.	No.	Biker	Constructor	Qualifying times		Final grid	Row
Pos.	No.	Biker	Constructor	Q1	Q2	Final grid	Row
1	89	(Spain) Jorge Martín	Ducati	Qualified in Q2	1:27.246	1	1
2	33	(South Africa) Brad Binder	KTM	Qualified in Q2	1:27.662	2	1
3	1	(Italy) Francesco Bagnaia	Ducati	1:28.160	1:27.714	3	1
4	41	(Spain) Aleix Espargaró	Aprilia	Qualified in Q2	1:27.844	4	2
5	5	(France) Johann Zarco	Ducati	Qualified in Q2	1:27.903	5	2
6	49	(Italy) Fabio Di Giannantonio	Ducati	Qualified in Q2	1:27.919	6	2
7	93	(Spain) Marc Márquez	Honda	1:28.237	1:28.012	7	3
8	43	(Australia) Jack Miller	KTM	Qualified in Q2	1:28.074	8	3
9	12	(Spain) Maverick Viñales	Aprilia	Qualified in Q2	1:28.093	9	3
10	72	(Italy) Marco Bezzecchi	Ducati	Qualified in Q2	1:28.121	10	4
11	44	(Spain) Pol Espargaró	KTM	Qualified in Q2	1:28.234	11	4
12	23	(Italy) Enea Bastianini	Ducati	Qualified in Q2	1:28.287	12	4
13	73	(Spain) Álex Márquez	Ducati	1:28.324	N/A	13	5
14	37	(Spain) Augusto Fernández	KTM	1:28.435	N/A	17 (Note: Three-place grid penalty for blocking Fabio Quartararo in Practice.)	6
15	25	(Spain) Raúl Fernández	Aprilia	1:28.607	N/A	14	5
16	36	(Spain) Joan Mir	Honda	1:28.841	N/A	15	5
17	20	(France) Fabio Quartararo	Yamaha	1:28.925	N/A	16	6
18	10	(Italy) Luca Marini	Ducati	1:29.047	N/A	18	6
19	88	(Portugal) Miguel Oliveira	Aprilia	1:29.182	N/A	19	7
20	21	(Italy) Franco Morbidelli	Yamaha	1:29.419	N/A	20	7
21	30	(Japan) Takaaki Nakagami	Honda	1:29.832	N/A	21	7
OFFICIAL MOTOGP QUALIFYING RESULTS

=== Moto2 ===
Fastest session lap

Pos.	No.	Biker	Constructor	Qualifying times		Final grid	Row
Pos.	No.	Biker	Constructor	Q1	Q2	Final grid	Row
1	54	(Spain) Fermín Aldeguer	Boscoscuro	Qualified in Q2	1:31.888	1	1
2	40	(Spain) Arón Canet	Kalex	Qualified in Q2	1:32.230	2	1
3	21	(Spain) Alonso López	Boscoscuro	Qualified in Q2	1:32.572	3	1
4	16	(United States) Joe Roberts	Kalex	Qualified in Q2	1:32.584	4	2
5	54	(Spain) Pedro Acosta	Kalex	Qualified in Q2	1:32.633	5	2
6	96	(United Kingdom) Jake Dixon	Kalex	Qualified in Q2	1:32.679	6	2
7	11	(Spain) Sergio García	Kalex	Qualified in Q2	1:32.769	7	3
8	14	(Italy) Tony Arbolino	Kalex	Qualified in Q2	1:32.888	8	3
9	15	(South Africa) Darryn Binder	Kalex	Qualified in Q2	1:32.946	9	3
10	18	(Spain) Manuel González	Kalex	Qualified in Q2	1:32.954	10	4
11	42	(Spain) Marcos Ramírez	Kalex	Qualified in Q2	1:33.052	11	4
12	22	(United Kingdom) Sam Lowes	Kalex	Qualified in Q2	1:33.070	12	4
13	13	(Italy) Celestino Vietti	Kalex	1:33.052	1:33.296	13	5
14	75	(Spain) Albert Arenas	Kalex	Qualified in Q2	1:33.339	14	5
15	7	(Belgium) Barry Baltus	Kalex	1:33.084	1:33.363	15	5
16	35	(Thailand) Somkiat Chantra	Kalex	Qualified in Q2	1:33.370	16	6
17	84	(Netherlands) Zonta van den Goorbergh	Kalex	1:33.231	1:33.561	17	6
18	12	(Czech Republic) Filip Salač	Kalex	1:32.943	1:33.628	18	6
19	52	(Spain) Jeremy Alcoba	Kalex	1:33.297	N/A	19	7
20	79	(Japan) Ai Ogura	Kalex	1:33.340	N/A	20	7
21	71	(Italy) Dennis Foggia	Kalex	1:33.451	N/A	21	7
22	64	(Netherlands) Bo Bendsneyder	Kalex	1:33.454	N/A	22	8
23	28	(Spain) Izan Guevara	Kalex	1:33.848	N/A	23	8
24	3	(Germany) Lukas Tulovic	Kalex	1:33.917	N/A	24	8
25	5	(Japan) Kohta Nozane	Kalex	1:33.940	N/A	25	9
26	23	(Japan) Taiga Hada	Kalex	1:33.997	N/A	26	9
27	67	(Italy) Alberto Surra	Forward	1:34.053	N/A	27	9
28	9	(Italy) Mattia Casadei	Kalex	1:34.055	N/A	28	10
29	33	(United Kingdom) Rory Skinner	Kalex	1:34.368	N/A	29	10
30	17	(Spain) Álex Escrig	Forward	1:34.710	N/A	30	10
OFFICIAL MOTO2 QUALIFYING RESULTS

=== Moto3 ===
Fastest session lap

Pos.	No.	Biker	Constructor	Qualifying times		Final grid	Row
Pos.	No.	Biker	Constructor	Q1	Q2	Final grid	Row
1	71	(Japan) Ayumu Sasaki	Husqvarna	Qualified in Q2	1:36.539	1	1
2	66	(Australia) Joel Kelso	CFMoto	Qualified in Q2	1:36.675	2	1
3	82	(Italy) Stefano Nepa	KTM	Qualified in Q2	1:36.755	3	1
4	10	(Brazil) Diogo Moreira	KTM	Qualified in Q2	1:36.860	4	2
5	18	(Italy) Matteo Bertelle	Honda	Qualified in Q2	1:36.978	5	2
6	95	(Netherlands) Collin Veijer	Husqvarna	Qualified in Q2	1:37.008	6	2
7	53	(Turkey) Deniz Öncü	KTM	Qualified in Q2	1:37.030	7	3
8	80	(Colombia) David Alonso	Gas Gas	Qualified in Q2	1:37.146	8	3
9	31	(Spain) Adrián Fernández	Honda	Qualified in Q2	1:37.286	9	3
10	21	(Spain) Vicente Pérez	KTM	Qualified in Q2	1:37.293	10	4
11	96	(Spain) Daniel Holgado	KTM	1:37.538	1:37.303	11	4
12	48	(Spain) Iván Ortolá	KTM	1:37.694	1:37.378	12	4
13	5	(Spain) Jaume Masià	Honda	Qualified in Q2	1:37.399	13	5
14	27	(Japan) Kaito Toba	Honda	Qualified in Q2	1:37.465	14	5
15	44	(Spain) David Muñoz	KTM	Qualified in Q2	1:37.513	15	5
16	7	(Italy) Filippo Farioli	KTM	1:37.631	1:37.519	16	6
17	6	(Japan) Ryusei Yamanaka	Gas Gas	1:37.562	1:37.661	17	6
18	54	(United Kingdom) Riccardo Rossi	Honda	Qualified in Q2	1:38.002	18	6
19	63	(Malaysia) Syarifuddin Azman	KTM	1:37.779	N/A	19	7
20	99	(Spain) José Antonio Rueda	KTM	1:37.814	N/A	20	7
21	72	(Japan) Taiyo Furusato	Honda	1:37.858	N/A	21	7
22	38	(Spain) David Salvador	KTM	1:37.888	N/A	22	8
23	9	(Italy) Nicola Carraro	Honda	1:38.088	N/A	23	8
24	64	(Indonesia) Mario Aji	Honda	1:38.098	N/A	24	8
25	20	(France) Lorenzo Fellon	KTM	1:38.124	N/A	25	9
26	70	(United Kingdom) Joshua Whatley	Honda	1:38.224	N/A	26	9
27	43	(Spain) Xavier Artigas	CFMoto	1:38.497	N/A	27	9
OFFICIAL MOTO3 QUALIFYING RESULTS

== MotoGP Sprint ==
Due to inclement weather, the MotoGP Sprint was cancelled. It was initially scheduled to be held after the Moto2 race.

== Warm up practice ==
=== MotoGP ===
Maverick Viñales set the best time 1:39.036 and was the fastest rider at this session ahead of Jorge Martín and Marc Márquez.

=== Moto2 ===
Zonta van den Goorbergh set the best time 1:45.713 and was the fastest rider at this session ahead of Sergio García and Jake Dixon.

=== Moto3 ===
Jaume Masià set the best time 1:49.237 and was the fastest rider at this session ahead of David Muñoz and Mario Aji.

== Race ==
=== MotoGP ===
Pos.	No.	Rider	Team	Constructor	Laps	Time/Retired	Grid	Points
1	5	(France) Johann Zarco	Prima Pramac Racing	Ducati	27	40:39.446	5	25
2	1	(Italy) Francesco Bagnaia	Ducati Lenovo Team	Ducati	27	+0.201	3	20
3	49	(Italy) Fabio Di Giannantonio	Gresini Racing MotoGP	Ducati	27	+0.477	6	16
4	33	(South Africa) Brad Binder	Red Bull KTM Factory Racing	KTM	27	+0.816	2	13
5	89	(Spain) Jorge Martín	Prima Pramac Racing	Ducati	27	+1.008	1	11
6	72	(Italy) Marco Bezzecchi	Mooney VR46 Racing Team	Ducati	27	+8.827	10	10
7	43	(Australia) Jack Miller	Red Bull KTM Factory Racing	KTM	27	+9.283	8	9
8	41	(Spain) Aleix Espargaró	Aprilia Racing	Aprilia	27	+9.387	4	8
9	73	(Spain) Álex Márquez	Gresini Racing MotoGP	Ducati	27	+9.696	13	7
10	23	(Italy) Enea Bastianini	Ducati Lenovo Team	Ducati	27	+12.523	12	6
11	12	(Spain) Maverick Viñales	Aprilia Racing	Aprilia	27	+13.992	9	5
12	10	(Italy) Luca Marini	Mooney VR46 Racing Team	Ducati	27	+17.078	18	4
13	88	(Portugal) Miguel Oliveira	CryptoData RNF MotoGP Team	Aprilia	27	+19.443	19	3
14	20	(France) Fabio Quartararo	Monster Energy Yamaha MotoGP	Yamaha	27	+20.949	16	2
15	93	(Spain) Marc Márquez	Repsol Honda Team	Honda	27	+21.118	7	1
16	25	(Spain) Raúl Fernández	CryptoData RNF MotoGP Team	Aprilia	27	+32.538	14	
17	21	(Italy) Franco Morbidelli	Monster Energy Yamaha MotoGP	Yamaha	27	+37.663	20	
18	44	(Spain) Pol Espargaró	GasGas Factory Racing Tech3	KTM	27	+37.668	11	
19	30	(Japan) Takaaki Nakagami	LCR Honda Idemitsu	Honda	27	+37.758	21	
Ret	37	(Spain) Augusto Fernández	GasGas Factory Racing Tech3	KTM	12	Accident	17	
Ret	36	(Spain) Joan Mir	Repsol Honda Team	Honda	10	Accident damage	15	
DNS	42	(Spain) Álex Rins	LCR Honda Castrol	Honda		Did not start		
Fastest lap: (Spain) Jorge Martín (Ducati) – 1:28.823 (lap 3)
OFFICIAL MOTOGP RACE REPORT

- Álex Rins withdrew from the rest of the weekend due to persistent right leg pain.

=== Moto2 ===
The race was scheduled to be run for 23 laps, but was red-flagged after 9 full laps due to inclement weather and bad track conditions. As less than 2/3 of the race distance was completed, the race was to be restarted for 6 laps. Eventually, race direction decided not to restart the race as track conditions were not improving. Per regulations, half points were awarded after failing to complete half of the original race distance.

Pos.	No.	Rider	Constructor	Laps	Time/Retired	Grid	Points
1	14	(Italy) Tony Arbolino	Kalex	9	16:22.970	8	12.5
2	40	(Spain) Arón Canet	Kalex	9	+15.088	2	10
3	54	(Spain) Fermín Aldeguer	Boscoscuro	9	+15.614	1	8
4	52	(Spain) Jeremy Alcoba	Kalex	8	+1 lap	19	6.5
5	16	(United States) Joe Roberts	Kalex	8	+1 lap	4	5.5
6	28	(Spain) Izan Guevara	Kalex	8	+1 lap	23	5
7	35	(Thailand) Somkiat Chantra	Kalex	8	+1 lap	16	4.5
8	64	(Netherlands) Bo Bendsneyder	Kalex	8	+1 lap	22	4
9	37	(Spain) Pedro Acosta	Kalex	8	+1 lap	5	3.5
10	24	(Spain) Marcos Ramírez	Kalex	8	+1 lap	11	3
11	23	(Japan) Taiga Hada	Kalex	8	+1 lap	26	2.5
12	33	(United Kingdom) Rory Skinner	Kalex	8	+1 lap	28	2
13	18	(Spain) Manuel González	Kalex	8	+1 lap	10	1.5
14	75	(Spain) Albert Arenas	Kalex	8	+1 lap	14	1
15	79	(Japan) Ai Ogura	Kalex	8	+1 lap	20	0.5
16	5	(Japan) Kohta Nozane	Kalex	8	+1 lap	25	
17	71	(Italy) Dennis Foggia	Kalex	8	+1 lap	21	
18	67	(Italy) Alberto Surra	Forward	8	+1 lap	27	
19	17	(Spain) Álex Escrig	Forward	8	+1 lap	29	
20	3	(Germany) Lukas Tulovic	Kalex	8	+1 lap	24	
NC (Note: Not classified for completing an insufficient number of laps.)	21	(Spain) Alonso López	Boscoscuro	5	+4 laps	3	
Ret	13	(Italy) Celestino Vietti	Kalex	8	Accident	13	
Ret	9	(Italy) Mattia Casadei	Kalex	4	Accident	30 (Note: Three-place grid penalty.)	
Ret	96	(United Kingdom) Jake Dixon	Kalex	4	Accident	6	
Ret	22	(United Kingdom) Sam Lowes	Kalex	3	Accident	12	
Ret	11	(Spain) Sergio García	Kalex	3	Accident	7	
Ret	12	(Czech Republic) Filip Salač	Kalex	3	Accident	18	
Ret	7	(Belgium) Barry Baltus	Kalex	2	Accident	15	
Ret	84	(Netherlands) Zonta van den Goorbergh	Kalex	2	Accident	17	
Ret	15	(South Africa) Darryn Binder	Kalex	2	Accident	9	
Fastest lap: (Italy) Tony Arbolino (Kalex) – 1:45.698 (lap 4)
OFFICIAL MOTO2 RACE REPORT

=== Moto3 ===
Pos.	No.	Rider	Constructor	Laps	Time/Retired	Grid	Points
1	53	(Turkey) Deniz Öncü	KTM	21	39:57.919	7	25
2	71	(Japan) Ayumu Sasaki	Husqvarna	21	+0.407	1	20
3	66	(Australia) Joel Kelso	CFMoto	21	+4.392	2	16
4	95	(Netherlands) Collin Veijer	Husqvarna	21	+23.062	6	13
5	31	(Spain) Adrián Fernández	Honda	21	+31.661	9	11
6	54	(Italy) Riccardo Rossi	Honda	21	+31.702	17	10
7	72	(Japan) Taiyo Furusato	Honda	21	+32.236	20	9
8	5	(Spain) Jaume Masià	Honda	21	+32.923	13	8
9	18	(Italy) Matteo Bertelle	Honda	21	+33.379	5	7
10	20	(France) Lorenzo Fellon	KTM	21	+35.375	24	6
11	9	(Italy) Nicola Carraro	Honda	21	+46.470	22	5
12	82	(Italy) Stefano Nepa	KTM	21	+53.566	3	4
13	96	(Spain) Daniel Holgado	KTM	21	+1:02.607	11	3
14	70	(United Kingdom) Joshua Whatley	Honda	21	+1:02.880	26 (Note: Back of the grid start penalty for blocking a rider during practice and qualifying.)	2
15	6	(Japan) Ryusei Yamanaka	Gas Gas	21	+1:16.638	16	1
16	43	(Spain) Xavier Artigas	CFMoto	21	+1:30.027	27	
17	27	(Japan) Kaito Toba	Honda	21	+1:52.035	25	
18	99	(Spain) José Antonio Rueda	KTM	20	+1 lap	19	
Ret	21	(Spain) Vicente Pérez	KTM	18	Accident	10	
Ret	63	(Malaysia) Syarifuddin Azman	KTM	14	Accident	18	
Ret	38	(Spain) David Salvador	KTM	12	Accident	21	
Ret	64	(Indonesia) Mario Aji	Honda	11	Accident	23	
Ret	80	(Colombia) David Alonso	Gas Gas	10	Accident damage	8	
Ret	44	(Spain) David Muñoz	KTM	9	Accident	14	
Ret	48	(Spain) Iván Ortolá	KTM	8	Accident	12	
Ret	7	(Italy) Filippo Farioli	KTM	8	Accident	15	
Ret	10	(Brazil) Diogo Moreira	KTM	5	Retired	4	
DNQ	19	(United Kingdom) Scott Ogden	Honda		Did not qualify		
Fastest lap: (Turkey) Deniz Öncü (KTM) – 1:51.997 (lap 16)
OFFICIAL MOTO3 RACE REPORT

== Championship standings after the race ==
Below are the standings for the top five riders, constructors, and teams after the round.

=== MotoGP ===
Riders' Championship standings

	Pos.	Rider	Points
	1	(Italy) Francesco Bagnaia	366
	2	(Spain) Jorge Martín	339
	3	(Italy) Marco Bezzecchi	293
	4	(South Africa) Brad Binder	224
2	5	(France) Johann Zarco	187

Constructors' Championship standings

Pos.	Constructor	Points
1	(Italy) Ducati	552
2	(Austria) KTM	296
3	(Italy) Aprilia	274
4	(Japan) Yamaha	154
5	(Japan) Honda	150

Teams' Championship standings

Pos.	Team	Points
1	(Italy) Prima Pramac Racing	526
2	(Italy) Mooney VR46 Racing Team	441
3	(Italy) Ducati Lenovo Team	418
4	(Austria) Red Bull KTM Factory Racing	368
5	(Italy) Aprilia Racing	355

=== Moto2 ===
Riders' Championship standings

Pos.	Rider	Points
1	(Spain) Pedro Acosta	280.5
2	(Italy) Tony Arbolino	224.5
3	(United Kingdom) Jake Dixon	172
4	(Spain) Arón Canet	154
5	(Thailand) Somkiat Chantra	127.5

Constructors' Championship standings

Pos.	Constructor	Points
1	(Germany) Kalex	382.5
2	(Italy) Boscoscuro	186
3	(Switzerland) Forward	1

Teams' Championship standings

Pos.	Team	Points
1	(Finland) Red Bull KTM Ajo	343.5
2	(Belgium) Elf Marc VDS Racing Team	304.5
3	(Spain) Pons Wegow Los40	238
4	(Italy) Beta Tools Speed Up	231
5	(Japan) Idemitsu Honda Team Asia	223

=== Moto3 ===
Riders' Championship standings

Pos.	Rider	Points
1	(Spain) Jaume Masià	217
2	(Japan) Ayumu Sasaki	213
3	(Spain) Daniel Holgado	195
4	(Colombia) David Alonso	180
5	(Turkey) Deniz Öncü	180

Constructors' Championship standings

Pos.	Constructor	Points
1	(Austria) KTM	338
2	(Japan) Honda	261
3	(Sweden) Husqvarna	231
4	(Spain) Gas Gas	198
5	(China) CFMoto	87

Teams' Championship standings

Pos.	Team	Points
1	(Germany) Liqui Moly Husqvarna Intact GP	302
2	(Finland) Red Bull KTM Ajo	291
3	(Luxembourg) Leopard Racing	278
4	(Italy) Angeluss MTA Team	252
5	(Spain) Gaviota GasGas Aspar Team	244

== Notes ==
Previous race: 2023 Indonesian Grand Prix	FIM Grand Prix World Championship; 2023 season	Next race: 2023 Thailand Grand Prix
Previous race: 2022 Australian Grand Prix	Australian motorcycle Grand Prix	Next race: 2024 Australian Grand Prix
