= Augusto Fernández (motorcyclist) =

Spanish motorcycle racer (born 1997)

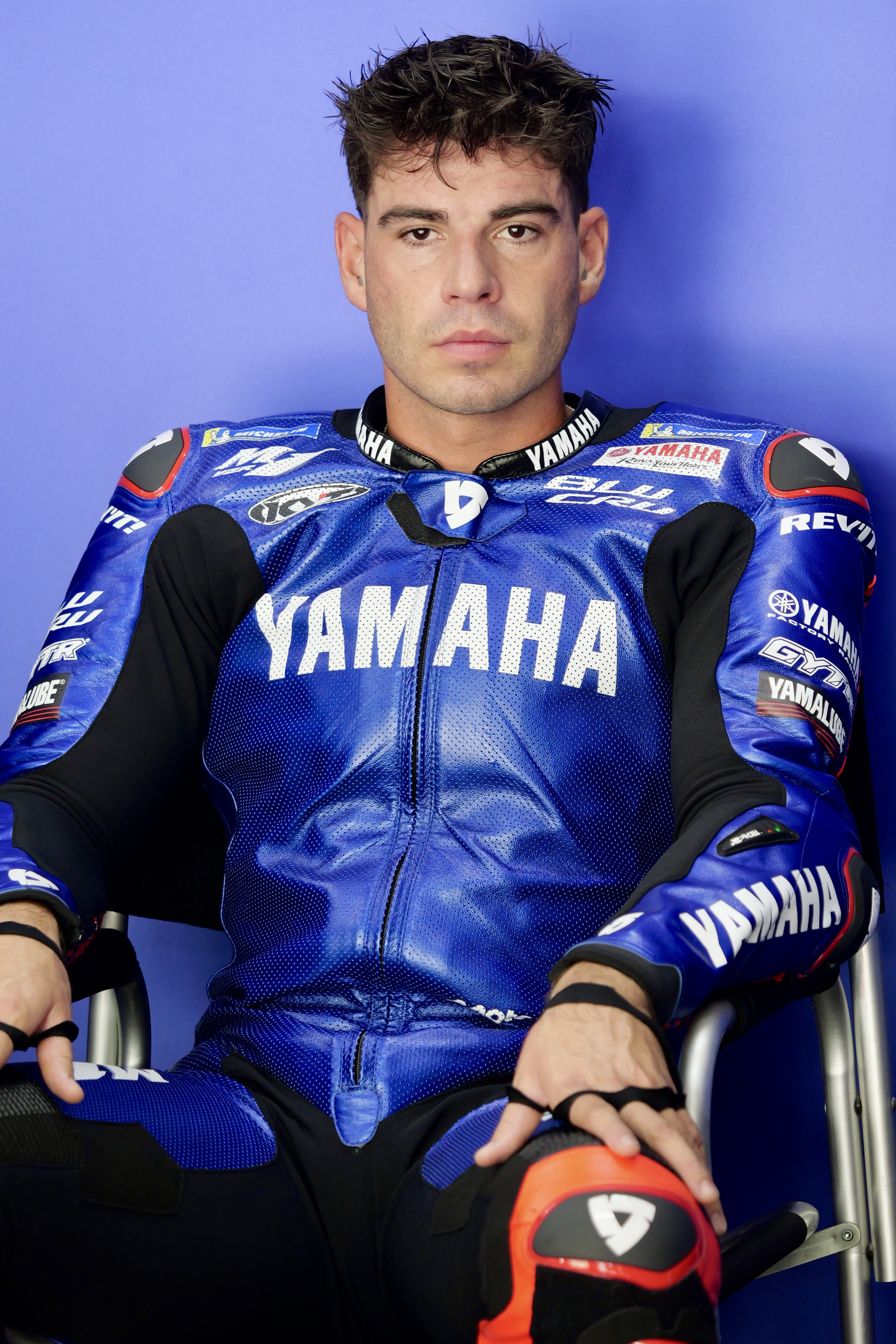
- Fernández at the 2025 Malaysian Grand Prix
- Nationality: Spanish
- Born: 23 September 1997 (age 29); Madrid, Spain
- Current team: Yamaha Factory Racing (Test rider); Pramac Racing Yamaha (replacement rider)
- Bike number: 47
Motorcycle racing career statistics
MotoGP World Championship
Active years	2023–2026
Manufacturers	KTM (2023–2024); Yamaha (2025–2026)
Championships	0
2025 championship position	25th (8 pts)
Starts / Wins / Podiums / Poles / F. laps / Points; 49 / 0 / 0 / 0 / 0 / 106
Moto2 World Championship
Active years	2017–2022
Manufacturers	Speed Up (2017); Kalex (2018–2022)
Championships	1 (2022)
2022 championship position	1st (271.5 pts)
Starts / Wins / Podiums / Poles / F. laps / Points; 94 / 7 / 20 / 3 / 11 / 774.5

Augusto Fernández Guerra (born 23 September 1997) is a Spanish motorcycle racer who serves as a test rider for Yamaha Motor Racing. He won the Moto2 Riders' World Championship in 2022. He is not related to fellow MotoGP rider Raúl Fernández, nor to Raul's younger brother, Moto3 rider Adrián Fernández.

== Career ==
=== Moto2 World Championship ===
==== Speed Up Racing (2017) ====
Fernández made his Grand Prix debut at the 2017 Italian Grand Prix replacing Axel Bassani in the Speed Up team. He remained with the team until the end of the season, scoring six points in total.

==== Pons Racing (2018–2019) ====
Fernández started the 2018 season in the Moto2 European Championship but was called up to Grand Prix competition when Héctor Barberá was fired from Pons Racing due to driving under influence. He replaced Barberá well, scoring points in his first four races, and improving over the season, ending his campaign with a sixth place in Motegi, a fourth place in Australia, and an eighth place in Valencia. Fernández finished the season 18th in the standings with 45 points, 35 points more than Barberá.

Fernández started the 2019 Moto2 World Championship with a 5th place in Qatar, before a double wrist fracture, suffered in a heavy crash in Argentina's Saturday practice session, caused him to miss the next two races. He would return from his injury with his maiden podium in Moto2 at Jerez, and repeat it with another third place, the very next weekend in Le Mans. A 5th place in Mugello was followed by his first pole position in the category in Barcelona, and though he only finished the race in fourth, two weeks later in Assen, Fernández would clinch his first victory in the Moto2 category, following Álex Márquez and Lorenzo Baldassarri crashing out of the lead together. He would win two more races in Britain and Misano, ending the season fifth in the championship standings, with 207 points.

==== Marc VDS Racing Team (2020–2021) ====
For the 2020 season, Fernández was given the seat of the outgoing Álex Márquez at Marc VDS Racing, partnering Sam Lowes. It would be a bit of a down year for him, failing to stand on the podium during the season, his highest finish being a fourth place in France. He ended the season 13th in the standings, with 71 points.

The 2021 Moto2 World Championship would see Fernández bounce back, despite starting the year poorly, including four retirements in the first eight races of the season. He finished third in Assen, Spielberg, Austria, and Aragón, second in Rimini, and then third again in the season closer in Valencia, making it six podiums in the last ten races for Fernández. He finished fifth in the standings with 174 points.

==== Red Bull KTM Ajo (2022) ====
Fernández was signed by Red Bull KTM Ajo for the 2022 season. That season, he won four races, on his way to winning the 2022 Moto2 World Championship, beating Ai Ogura to the title.

=== MotoGP World Championship ===
==== Red Bull GasGas Tech3 (2023–2024) ====
Fernández graduated to the MotoGP class during the 2023 season, riding for GasGas Factory Racing Tech3, alongside Pol Espargaró. At the French Grand Prix, Fernández recorded his best finish of the season, taking fourth after qualifying 12th, his highest grid position in the premier class.

For 2024 season, Fernández was partnered with Pedro Acosta with the renamed Red Bull GasGas Tech3. He managed to score a total of 27 points and finished 20th in the championship standings.

==== Yamaha Test Rider (2025–) ====
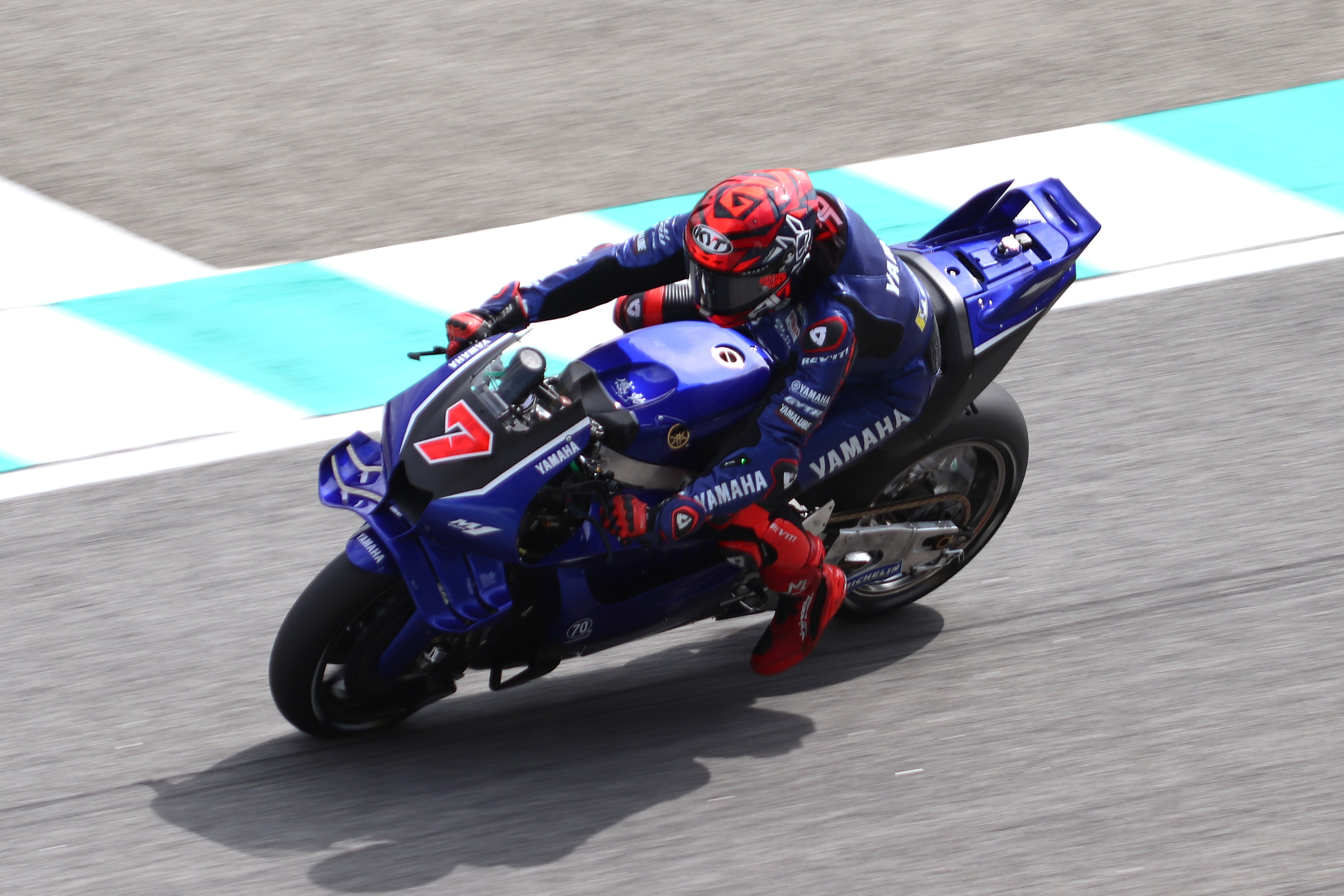
Fernández at the 2025 Malaysian Grand Prix

After not being retained by KTM for 2025, Fernández announced in an interview with MotoGP.com that he would be a Yamaha test rider. Interestingly, he announced this before an official announcement was made by Yamaha.

On December 17, 2024, Yamaha Racing officially announced Fernández as an official MotoGP test rider, with up to six wild-card rides. At the 2025 Americas Grand Prix, Qatar Grand Prix, and Spanish Grand Prix, Fernández replaced the injured Miguel Oliveira at Pramac Racing, with a 13th-place finish in the USA.

In September 2025, Fernández signed on to remain as the test rider for Yamaha for the 2026 and 2027 seasons.

In 2026, Fernández took part in three wildcard entries with Yamaha. He will replace an injured Toprak Razgatlıoğlu for the final five rounds of the season at Prima Pramac Yamaha.

== Career statistics ==
=== Career highlights ===
- 2013 - 2nd, European Junior Cup, Honda CBR500R

=== FIM European Junior Cup ===
==== Races by year ====
(key) (Races in bold indicate pole position, races in italics indicate fastest lap)

Year	Bike	1	2	3	4	5	6	7	8	Pos	Pts
2014	Honda	ARA; 4	ASS; 1	IMO; 1	DON; 3	MIS; 1	POR; 1	JER; 6	MAG; 3	1st	155

=== FIM European Superstock 600 ===
==== Races by year ====
(key) (Races in bold indicate pole position, races in italics indicate fastest lap)

Year	Bike	1	2	3	4	5	6	7	8	Pos	Pts
2015	Honda	SPA; 8	SPA; 6	NED; 27	IMO; 10	POR; 5	**ITA**; Ret	SPA; 2	FRA; 1	4th	80

=== FIM CEV Moto2 European Championship ===
==== Races by year ====
(key) (Races in bold indicate pole position, races in italics indicate fastest lap)

Year	Bike	1	2	3	4	5	6	7	8	9	10	11	Pos	Pts
2016	Tech 3	VAL1	VAL2	ARA1; 4	ARA2; 4	CAT1; 4	CAT2; 7	ALB; Ret	ALG1; 4	ALG2; 4	JER; 4	VAL; 5	5th	98
2017	Suter	ALB; 3	CAT1	CAT2	VAL1	VAL2	EST1	EST2	JER	ARA1	ARA2	VAL	20th	16
2018	Kalex	**EST1**; 2	**EST2**; 2	VAL; 3	CAT1; 2	CAT2; 1	ARA1	ARA2	JER	ALB1	ALB2	VAL	4th	101

=== Grand Prix motorcycle racing ===
==== By season ====
Season	Class	Motorcycle	Team	Race	Win	Podium	Pole	FLap	Pts	Plcd	WCh
2017	Moto2	Speed Up	Speed Up Racing	13	0	0	0	0	6	31st	–
2018	Moto2	Kalex	Pons HP40	12	0	0	0	1	45	18th	–
2019	Moto2	Kalex	Flexbox HP40	17	3	5	1	3	207	5th	–
2020	Moto2	Kalex	EG 0,0 Marc VDS	14	0	0	0	1	71	13th	–
2021	Moto2	Kalex	Elf Marc VDS Racing Team	18	0	6	0	1	174	5th	–
2022	Moto2	Kalex	Red Bull KTM Ajo	20	4	9	2	5	271.5	**1st**	1
2023	MotoGP	KTM	GasGas Factory Racing Tech3	20	0	0	0	0	71	17th	–
2024	MotoGP	KTM	Red Bull GasGas Tech3	20	0	0	0	0	27	20th	–
2025	MotoGP	Yamaha	Prima Pramac Yamaha MotoGP	3	0	0	0	0	8	25th	–
2025	MotoGP	Yamaha	Yamaha Factory Racing	5	0	0	0	0	8	25th	–
2026	MotoGP	Yamaha	Yamaha Factory Racing	1	0	0	0	0	0*	24th*	–
Total				**143**	**7**	**20**	**3**	**11**	**880.5**		**1**

==== By class ====
Class	Seasons	1st GP	1st pod	1st win	Race	Win	Podiums	Pole	FLap	Pts	WChmp
Moto2	2017–2022	2017 Italy	2019 Spain	2019 Netherlands	94	7	20	3	11	774.5	1
MotoGP	2023–present	2023 Portugal			49	0	0	0	0	106	0
Total	2017–present				**143**	**7**	**20**	**3**	**11**	**880.5**	**1**

==== Races by year ====
(Races in bold indicate pole position, races in italics indicate fastest lap)

Year	Class	Bike	1	2	3	4	5	6	7	8	9	10	11	12	13	14	15	16	17	18	19	20	21	22	Pos	Pts
2017	Moto2	Speed Up	QAT	ARG	AME	SPA	FRA	ITA; 25	CAT; 21	NED; 19	GER; DSQ	CZE; 27	AUT; 16	GBR; 26	RSM; Ret	ARA; 22	JPN; 16	AUS; 17	MAL; 12	VAL; 14					31st	6
2018	Moto2	Kalex	QAT	ARG	AME	SPA	FRA	ITA	CAT; 14	NED; 12	GER; 15	CZE; 12	AUT; Ret	GBR; C	RSM; Ret	ARA; 13	THA; Ret	JPN; 6	AUS; 4	MAL; Ret	VAL; 8				18th	45
2019	Moto2	Kalex	QAT; 5	ARG; DNS	AME	SPA; 3	FRA; 3	ITA; 5	**CAT**; 4	NED; 1	GER; 6	CZE; 8	AUT; 5	GBR; 1	RSM; 1	ARA; 22	THA; 4	JPN; 8	AUS; 19	MAL; 11	VAL; 6				5th	207
2020	Moto2	Kalex	QAT; Ret	SPA; 13	ANC; 13	CZE; 5	AUT; 8	STY; Ret	RSM; 5	EMI; 18	CAT; Ret	FRA; 4	ARA; 11	TER; 8	EUR; DNS	VAL; 15	POR; 8								13th	71
2021	Moto2	Kalex	QAT; 14	DOH; 6	POR; 5	SPA; Ret	FRA; Ret	ITA; Ret	CAT; 5	GER; Ret	NED; 3	STY; 3	AUT; 3	GBR; 6	ARA; 3	RSM; 6	AME; 4	EMI; 2	ALR; 9	VAL; 3					5th	174
2022	Moto2	Kalex	QAT; 4	INA; 5	ARG; Ret	AME; 9	POR; Ret	SPA; 4	FRA; 1	ITA; 5	CAT; 3	GER; 1	NED; 1	**GBR**; 1	AUT; 5	RSM; 3	**ARA**; 3	JPN; 2	THA; 7^{‡}	AUS; Ret	MAL; 4	VAL; 2			1st	271.5
2023	MotoGP	KTM	POR; 13	ARG; 11	AME; 10	SPA; 13	FRA; 4	ITA; 15	GER; 11	NED; 10	GBR; 11^{8}	AUT; 14	CAT; 9	RSM; 16	IND; Ret	JPN; 7	INA; Ret	AUS; Ret	THA; 17	MAL; 14	QAT; 15^{9}	VAL; Ret			17th	71
2024	MotoGP	KTM	QAT; 17	POR; 11	AME; 14	SPA; Ret**^{7}**	FRA; 13	CAT; Ret	ITA; Ret	NED; 14	GER; 16	GBR; 16	AUT; 15	ARA; 12	RSM; Ret	EMI; 18	INA; Ret	JPN; Ret	AUS; 17**^{9}**	THA; Ret	MAL; 10	SLD; 19			20th	27
2025	MotoGP	Yamaha	THA	ARG	AME; 13	QAT; Ret	SPA; 16	FRA	GBR	ARA; 13	ITA	NED	GER	CZE; 18	AUT	HUN	CAT	RSM; 14	JPN	INA	AUS	MAL; 18	POR	VAL; 16	25th	8
2026	MotoGP	Yamaha	THA	BRA	USA	SPA; 20	FRA	CAT; 12	ITA	HUN	CZE	NED; 15	GER	GBR; 15	ARA	RSM	AUT	JPN	INA	AUS; C	MAL	QAT	POR	VAL	24th*	6*

^{‡} Half points awarded as less than two thirds of the race distance (but at least three full laps) was completed.
