= 2026 Italian motorcycle Grand Prix =

Motorcycle race in Scarperia e San Piero

(Italy) 2026 Italian Grand Prix
Race details
- Race 7 of 22 races in the 2026 Grand Prix motorcycle racing season
- Date: 31 May 2026
- Official name: Brembo Grand Prix of Italy
- Location: Autodromo Internazionale del Mugello; Scarperia e San Piero, Italy
- Course: Permanent racing facility; 5.245 km (3.259 mi)

MotoGP
Pole position
Rider	(Italy) Marco Bezzecchi	Aprilia
Time	1:43.921	
Fastest lap
Rider	(Italy) Francesco Bagnaia	Ducati
Time	1:45.470 on lap 3	
Podium
First	(Italy) Marco Bezzecchi	Aprilia
Second	(Spain) Jorge Martín	Aprilia
Third	(Italy) Francesco Bagnaia	Ducati

Moto2
Pole position
Rider	(Spain) Manuel González	Kalex
Time	1:48.474	
Fastest lap
Rider	(Spain) Iván Ortolá	Kalex
Time	1:49.497 on lap 2	
Podium
First	(Spain) Manuel González	Kalex
Second	(Italy) Celestino Vietti	Boscoscuro
Third	(Spain) Daniel Holgado	Kalex

Moto3
Pole position
Rider	(Spain) David Almansa	KTM
Time	1:54.862	
Fastest lap
Rider	(Spain) Máximo Quiles	KTM
Time	1:55.444 on lap 2	
Podium
First	(Spain) Brian Uriarte	KTM
Second	(Spain) Álvaro Carpe	KTM
Third	(Malaysia) Hakim Danish	KTM

The 2026 Italian motorcycle Grand Prix (officially known as the Brembo Grand Prix of Italy) was the seventh round of the 2026 Grand Prix motorcycle racing season. All races were held at the Autodromo Internazionale del Mugello in Scarperia e San Piero on 31 May 2026.

== Qualifying ==
=== MotoGP ===
Fastest session lap

Pos.	No.	Rider	Team	Constructor	Q1	Q2	Final grid	Row
1	72	(Italy) Marco Bezzecchi	Aprilia Racing	Aprilia	Qualified to Q2	1:43.921	1	1
2	25	(Spain) Raúl Fernández	Trackhouse MotoGP Team	Aprilia	1:44.538	1:44.145	2	1
3	89	(Spain) Jorge Martín	Aprilia Racing	Aprilia	Qualified to Q2	1:44.284	3	1
4	93	(Spain) Marc Márquez	Ducati Lenovo Team	Ducati	Qualified to Q2	1:44.294	4	2
5	54	(Spain) Fermín Aldeguer	BK8 Gresini Racing MotoGP	Ducati	Qualified to Q2	1:44.313	5	2
6	63	(Italy) Francesco Bagnaia	Ducati Lenovo Team	Ducati	Qualified to Q2	1:44.482	6	2
7	49	(Italy) Fabio Di Giannantonio	Pertamina Enduro VR46 Racing Team	Ducati	Qualified to Q2	1:44.498	7	3
8	11	(Brazil) Diogo Moreira	Pro Honda LCR	Honda	Qualified to Q2	1:44.634	8	3
9	21	(Italy) Franco Morbidelli	Pertamina Enduro VR46 Racing Team	Ducati	Qualified to Q2	1:44.655	9	3
10	37	(Spain) Pedro Acosta	Red Bull KTM Factory Racing	KTM	1:44.765	1:44.710	10	4
11	23	(Italy) Enea Bastianini	Red Bull KTM Tech3	KTM	Qualified to Q2	1:44.863	11	4
12	42	(Spain) Álex Rins	Monster Energy Yamaha MotoGP Team	Yamaha	Qualified to Q2	1:45.049	12	4
13	79	(Japan) Ai Ogura	Trackhouse MotoGP Team	Aprilia	1:44.852	N/A	13	5
14	33	(South Africa) Brad Binder	Red Bull KTM Factory Racing	KTM	1:44.908	N/A	14	5
15	36	(Spain) Joan Mir	Honda HRC Castrol	Honda	1:45.274	N/A	15	5
16	10	(Italy) Luca Marini	Honda HRC Castrol	Honda	1:45.279	N/A	16	6
17	43	(Australia) Jack Miller	Prima Pramac Yamaha MotoGP	Yamaha	1:45.288	N/A	17	6
18	20	(France) Fabio Quartararo	Monster Energy Yamaha MotoGP Team	Yamaha	1:45.498	N/A	18	6
19	12	(Spain) Maverick Viñales	Red Bull KTM Tech3	KTM	1:45.873	N/A	19	7
20	7	(Turkey) Toprak Razgatlıoğlu	Prima Pramac Yamaha MotoGP	Yamaha	1:46.137	N/A	20	7
21	51	(Italy) Michele Pirro	BK8 Gresini Racing MotoGP	Ducati	1:46.161	N/A	21	7
22	35	(United Kingdom) Cal Crutchlow	Castrol Honda LCR	Honda	1:47.092	N/A	22	8
Official MotoGP Qualifying 1 Report
Official MotoGP Qualifying 2 Report
Official MotoGP Grid Report

== MotoGP Sprint ==
The MotoGP Sprint was held on 30 May 2026.

Pos.	No.	Rider	Team	Manufacturer	Laps	Time/Retired	Grid	Points
1	25	(Spain) Raúl Fernández	Trackhouse MotoGP Team	Aprilia	11	19:28.408	2	12
2	89	(Spain) Jorge Martín	Aprilia Racing	Aprilia	11	+1.289	3	9
3	49	(Italy) Fabio Di Giannantonio	Pertamina Enduro VR46 Racing Team	Ducati	11	+3.287	7	7
4	72	(Italy) Marco Bezzecchi	Aprilia Racing	Aprilia	11	+4.481	1	6
5	93	(Spain) Marc Márquez	Ducati Lenovo Team	Ducati	11	+9.055	4	5
6	54	(Spain) Fermín Aldeguer	BK8 Gresini Racing MotoGP	Ducati	11	+9.758	5	4
7	63	(Italy) Francesco Bagnaia	Ducati Lenovo Team	Ducati	11	+10.983	6	3
8	79	(Japan) Ai Ogura	Trackhouse MotoGP Team	Aprilia	11	+11.411	13	2
9	37	(Spain) Pedro Acosta	Red Bull KTM Factory Racing	KTM	11	+11.809	10	1
10	11	(Brazil) Diogo Moreira	Pro Honda LCR	Honda	11	+12.932	8	
11	33	(South Africa) Brad Binder	Red Bull KTM Factory Racing	KTM	11	+16.690	14	
12	42	(Spain) Álex Rins	Monster Energy Yamaha MotoGP Team	Yamaha	11	+17.043	12	
13	10	(Italy) Luca Marini	Honda HRC Castrol	Honda	11	+18.407	16	
14	20	(France) Fabio Quartararo	Monster Energy Yamaha MotoGP Team	Yamaha	11	+20.619	18	
15	12	(Spain) Maverick Viñales	Red Bull KTM Tech3	KTM	11	+20.669	19	
16	43	(Australia) Jack Miller	Prima Pramac Yamaha MotoGP	Yamaha	11	+22.907	17	
17	7	(Turkey) Toprak Razgatlıoğlu	Prima Pramac Yamaha MotoGP	Yamaha	11	+25.423	20	
18	51	(Italy) Michele Pirro	BK8 Gresini Racing MotoGP	Ducati	11	+27.085	21	
19	35	(United Kingdom) Cal Crutchlow	Castrol Honda LCR	Honda	11	+39.671	22	
Ret	36	(Spain) Joan Mir	Honda HRC Castrol	Honda	6	Technical	15	
Ret	21	(Italy) Franco Morbidelli	Pertamina Enduro VR46 Racing Team	Ducati	4	Accident	9	
Ret	23	(Italy) Enea Bastianini	Red Bull KTM Tech3	KTM	4	Accident	11	
Fastest sprint lap: (Spain) Raúl Fernández (Aprilia) - 1:44.712 (lap 2)
Official MotoGP Sprint Report

== Race ==
=== MotoGP ===
Pos.	No.	Rider	Team	Manufacturer	Laps	Time/Retired	Grid	Points
1	72	(Italy) Marco Bezzecchi	Aprilia Racing	Aprilia	23	40:57.347	1	25
2	89	(Spain) Jorge Martín	Aprilia Racing	Aprilia	23	+3.559	3	20
3	63	(Italy) Francesco Bagnaia	Ducati Lenovo Team	Ducati	23	+5.098	6	16
4	79	(Japan) Ai Ogura	Trackhouse MotoGP Team	Aprilia	23	+5.132	13	13
5	49	(Italy) Fabio Di Giannantonio	Pertamina Enduro VR46 Racing Team	Ducati	23	+5.453	7	11
6	37	(Spain) Pedro Acosta	Red Bull KTM Factory	KTM	23	+7.467	10	10
7	93	(Spain) Marc Márquez	Ducati Lenovo Team	Ducati	23	+10.762	4	9
8	54	(Spain) Fermín Aldeguer	BK8 Gresini Racing MotoGP	Ducati	23	+14.644	5	8
9	25	(Spain) Raúl Fernández	Trackhouse MotoGP Team	Aprilia	23	+13.380	2	7
10	11	(Brazil) Diogo Moreira	Pro Honda LCR	Honda	23	+21.366	8	6
11	33	(South Africa) Brad Binder	Red Bull KTM Factory	KTM	23	+21.479	14	5
12	36	(Spain) Joan Mir	Honda HRC Castrol	Honda	23	+21.795	15	4
13	10	(Italy) Luca Marini	Honda HRC Castrol	Honda	23	+22.059	19	3
14	21	(Italy) Franco Morbidelli	Pertamina Enduro VR46 Racing Team	Ducati	23	+29.789	9	2
15	43	(Australia) Jack Miller	Prima Pramac Yamaha MotoGP	Yamaha	23	+32.289	16	1
16	7	(Turkey) Toprak Razgatlıoğlu	Prima Pramac Yamaha MotoGP	Yamaha	23	+31.920	20	
17	12	(Spain) Maverick Viñales	Red Bull KTM Tech3	KTM	23	+32.717	18	
18	20	(France) Fabio Quartararo	Monster Energy Yamaha MotoGP Team	Yamaha	23	+34.335	17	
19	51	(Italy) Michele Pirro	BK8 Gresini Racing MotoGP	Ducati	23	+40.553	21	
Ret	23	(Italy) Enea Bastianini	Red Bull KTM Tech3	KTM	11	Accident	11	
Ret	42	(Spain) Álex Rins	Monster Energy Yamaha MotoGP Team	Yamaha	10	Accident	12	
Ret	35	(United Kingdom) Cal Crutchlow	Castrol Honda LCR	Honda	10	Technical	22	
Fastest lap: (Italy) Francesco Bagnaia (Ducati) – 1:45.470 (lap 3)
Official MotoGP Race Report

=== Moto2 ===
Pos.	No.	Rider	Team	Manufacturer	Laps	Time/Retired	Grid	Points
1	18	(Spain) Manuel González	Liqui Moly Dynavolt Intact GP	Kalex	19	35:12.315	1	25
2	13	(Italy) Celestino Vietti	MB Conveyors SpeedRS Team	Boscoscuro	19	+5.327	16	20
3	96	(Spain) Daniel Holgado	CFMoto Inde Aspar Team	Kalex	19	+5.462	4	16
4	81	(Australia) Senna Agius	Liqui Moly Dynavolt Intact GP	Kalex	19	+5.479	7	13
5	12	(Czech Republic) Filip Salač	OnlyFans American Racing Team	Kalex	19	+7.568	2	11
6	21	(Spain) Alonso López	Italjet Gresini Moto2	Kalex	19	+9.987	6	10
7	28	(Spain) Izan Guevara	Blu Cru Pramac Yamaha Moto2	Boscoscuro	19	+10.952	8	9
8	7	(Belgium) Barry Baltus	Reds Fantic Racing	Kalex	19	+15.463	19	8
9	95	(Netherlands) Collin Veijer	Red Bull KTM Ajo	Kalex	19	+16.428	5	7
10	53	(Turkey) Deniz Öncü	Elf Marc VDS Racing Team	Boscoscuro	19	+19.587	17	6
11	14	(Italy) Tony Arbolino	Reds Fantic Racing	Kalex	19	+19.603	12	5
12	99	(Spain) Adrián Huertas	Italtrans Racing Team	Kalex	19	+20.302	25	4
13	98	(Spain) José Antonio Rueda	Red Bull KTM Ajo	Kalex	19	+22.233	21	3
14	16	(United States) Joe Roberts	OnlyFans American Racing Team	Kalex	19	+22.253	15	2
15	84	(Netherlands) Zonta van den Goorbergh	Momoven Idrofoglia RW Racing Team	Kalex	19	+22.874	14	1
16	32	(Italy) Luca Lunetta	MB Conveyors SpeedRS Team	Boscoscuro	19	+25.332	20	
17	3	(Spain) Sergio García	Italjet Gresini Moto2	Kalex	19	+25.372	18	
18	80	(Colombia) David Alonso	CFMoto Inde Aspar Team	Kalex	19	+25.944	9	
19	54	(Spain) Alberto Ferrández	Blu Cru Pramac Yamaha Moto2	Boscoscuro	19	+28.843	Pit lane	
20	17	(Spain) Daniel Muñoz	Italtrans Racing Team	Kalex	19	+28.862	13	
21	10	(Spain) Unai Orradre	QJMotor – Green Power – MSi	Kalex	19	+35.661	26	
Ret	4	(Spain) Iván Ortolá	QJMotor – Green Power – MSi	Kalex	17	Technical	10	
Ret	71	(Japan) Ayumu Sasaki	Momoven Idrofoglia RW Racing Team	Kalex	6	Accident	11	
Ret	11	(Spain) Álex Escrig	Klint Racing Team	Forward	1	Collision	3	
Ret	44	(Spain) Arón Canet	Elf Marc VDS Racing Team	Boscoscuro	0	Collision	22	
Ret	85	(Spain) Xabi Zurutuza	Klint Racing Team	Forward	0	Collision	24	
Ret	72	(Japan) Taiyo Furusato	Honda Team Asia	Kalex	0	Accident	27	
Fastest lap: (Spain) Iván Ortolá (Kalex) – 1:49.497 (lap 2)
Official Moto2 Race Report

=== Moto3 ===
Pos.	No.	Rider	Team	Manufacturer	Laps	Time/Retired	Grid	Points
1	51	(Spain) Brian Uriarte	Red Bull KTM Ajo	KTM	17	33:07.801	3	25
2	83	(Spain) Álvaro Carpe	Red Bull KTM Ajo	KTM	17	+0.418	11	20
3	13	(Malaysia) Hakim Danish	Aeon Credit – MT Helmets – MSi	KTM	17	+0.456	1	16
4	31	(Spain) Adrián Fernández	Leopard Racing	Honda	17	+0.482	8	13
5	78	(Spain) Joel Esteban	LevelUp – MTA	KTM	17	+0.842	5	11
6	8	(United Kingdom) Eddie O'Shea	Gryd – MLav Racing	Honda	17	+0.970	13	10
7	64	(Spain) David Muñoz	Liqui Moly Dynavolt Intact GP	KTM	17	+1.069	6	9
8	9	(Indonesia) Veda Pratama	Honda Team Asia	Honda	17	+1.081	12	8
9	6	(Australia) Joel Kelso	Gryd – MLav Racing	Honda	17	+1.085	2	7
10	54	(Spain) Jesús Ríos	Rivacold Snipers Team	Honda	17	+1.091	4	6
11	28	(Spain) Máximo Quiles	CFMoto Valresa Aspar Team	KTM	17	+1.202	14	5
12	18	(Italy) Matteo Bertelle	LevelUp – MTA	KTM	17	+1.285	16	4
13	97	(Argentina) Marco Morelli	CFMoto Valresa Aspar Team	KTM	17	+1.351	7	3
14	19	(United Kingdom) Scott Ogden	CIP Green Power	KTM	17	+1.569	9	2
15	94	(Italy) Guido Pini	Leopard Racing	Honda	17	+2.330	18	1
16	6	(Japan) Ryusei Yamanaka	Aeon Credit – MT Helmets – MSi	KTM	17	+5.565	10	
17	11	(Spain) Adrián Cruces	CIP Green Power	KTM	17	+5.596	22	
18	73	(Argentina) Valentín Perrone	Red Bull KTM Tech3	KTM	17	+5.636	15	
19	14	(New Zealand) Cormac Buchanan	Code Motorsports	KTM	17	+5.740	17	
20	10	(Italy) Nicola Carraro	Rivacold Snipers Team	Honda	17	+8.904 (Note: 3-second penalty for failing to comply with long lap penalty.)	24	
21	21	(South Africa) Ruché Moodley	Code Motorsports	KTM	17	+9.679	19	
22	32	(Japan) Zen Mitani	Honda Team Asia	Honda	17	+26.357	25	
23	5	(Austria) Leo Rammerstorfer	Sic58 Squadra Corse	Honda	17	+26.435	23	
Ret	27	(Finland) Rico Salmela	Red Bull KTM Tech3	KTM	6	Accident	21	
Ret	67	(Republic of Ireland) Casey O'Gorman	Sic58 Squadra Corse	Honda	2	Technical	20	
DNS	22	(Spain) David Almansa	Liqui Moly Dynavolt Intact GP	KTM		Did not start		
Fastest lap: (Spain) Máximo Quiles (KTM) – 1:55.444 (lap 2)
Official Moto3 Race Report

== Championship standings after the race ==
Below are the standings for the top five riders, constructors, and teams after the round.

=== MotoGP ===
Riders' Championship standings

Pos.	Rider	Points
1	(Italy) Marco Bezzecchi	173
2	(Spain) Jorge Martín	156
3	(Italy) Fabio Di Giannantonio	134
4	(Spain) Pedro Acosta	103
5	(Japan) Ai Ogura	92

Constructors' Championship standings

Pos.	Constructor	Points
1	(Italy) Aprilia	218
2	(Italy) Ducati	188
3	(Austria) KTM	125
4	(Japan) Honda	70
5	(Japan) Yamaha	41

Teams' Championship standings

	Pos.	Team	Points
	1	(Italy) Aprilia Racing	329
1	2	(United States) Trackhouse MotoGP Team	179
1	3	(Italy) Pertamina Enduro VR46 Racing Team	172
1	4	(Italy) Ducati Lenovo Team	153
1	5	(Austria) Red Bull KTM Factory Racing	145

=== Moto2 ===
Riders' Championship standings

	Pos.	Rider	Points
	1	(Spain) Manuel González	129.5
	2	(Spain) Izan Guevara	95
	3	(Italy) Celestino Vietti	93
	4	(Australia) Senna Agius	78
2	5	(Spain) Daniel Holgado	65

Constructors' Championship standings

Pos.	Constructor	Points
1	(Germany) Kalex	157.5
2	(Italy) Boscoscuro	116
3	(Switzerland) Forward	30

Teams' Championship standings

	Pos.	Team	Points
	1	(Germany) Liqui Moly Dynavolt Intact GP	207.5
	2	(Spain) CFMoto Inde Aspar Team	123
1	3	(Italy) Beta Tools SpeedRS Team	100
1	4	(Italy) Blu Cru Pramac Yamaha Moto2	96.5
3	5	(Italy) Reds Fantic Racing	55.5

=== Moto3 ===
Riders' Championship standings

	Pos.	Rider	Points
	1	(Spain) Máximo Quiles	145
1	2	(Spain) Álvaro Carpe	93
1	3	(Spain) Adrián Fernández	89
5	4	(Spain) Brian Uriarte	67
	5	(Indonesia) Veda Pratama	66

Constructors' Championship standings

Pos.	Constructor	Points
1	(Austria) KTM	170
2	(Japan) Honda	113

Teams' Championship standings

	Pos.	Team	Points
	1	(Spain) CFMoto Valresa Aspar Team	206
1	2	(Finland) Red Bull KTM Ajo	160
1	3	(Luxembourg) Leopard Racing	136
	4	(Germany) Liqui Moly Dynavolt Intact GP	101
	5	(France) Red Bull KTM Tech3	77

== Notes ==
Previous race: 2026 Catalan Grand Prix	FIM Grand Prix World Championship; 2026 season	Next race: 2026 Hungarian Grand Prix
Previous race: 2025 Italian Grand Prix	Italian motorcycle Grand Prix	Next race: 2027 Italian Grand Prix
