= 2026 United States motorcycle Grand Prix =

Motorcycle races in Austin

2026 United States Grand Prix
Race details
- Race 3 of 22 races in the 2026 Grand Prix motorcycle racing season
- Date: March 29, 2026
- Official name: Red Bull Grand Prix of the United States
- Location: Circuit of the Americas; Austin, Texas, United States
- Course: Permanent racing facility; 5.513 km (3.426 mi)

MotoGP
Pole position
Rider	(Italy) Fabio Di Giannantonio	Ducati
Time	2:00.136	
Fastest lap
Rider	(Japan) Ai Ogura	Aprilia
Time	2:02.037 on lap 9	
Podium
First	(Italy) Marco Bezzecchi	Aprilia
Second	(Spain) Jorge Martín	Aprilia
Third	(Spain) Pedro Acosta	KTM

Moto2
Pole position
Rider	(Belgium) Barry Baltus	Kalex
Time	2:05.347	
Fastest lap
Rider	(Colombia) David Alonso	Kalex
Time	2:06.456 on lap 6	
Podium
First	(Australia) Senna Agius	Kalex
Second	(Italy) Celestino Vietti	Boscoscuro
Third	(Spain) Izan Guevara	Boscoscuro

Moto3
Pole position
Rider	(Spain) Álvaro Carpe	KTM
Time	2:12.107	
Fastest lap
Rider	(Italy) Guido Pini	Honda
Time	2:13.417 on lap 6	
Podium
First	(Italy) Guido Pini	Honda
Second	(Spain) Máximo Quiles	KTM
Third	(Spain) Álvaro Carpe	KTM

The 2026 United States motorcycle Grand Prix (Note: The Grand Prix was also mentioned as the 2026 Motorcycle Grand Prix of the Americas in some sources as the previous year's race in the same circuit still carried the Motorcycle Grand Prix of the Americas race title. MotoGP quietly changed the Grand Prix title for 2026.) (officially known as the Red Bull Grand Prix of the United States) was the third round of the 2026 Grand Prix motorcycle racing season. All races were held at the Circuit of the Americas in Austin, Texas, on March 29, 2026.

== Qualifying ==
=== MotoGP ===
Fastest session lap

Pos.	No.	Rider	Team	Constructor	Q1	Q2	Final grid	Row
1	49	(Italy) Fabio Di Giannantonio	Pertamina Enduro VR46 Racing Team	Ducati	Qualified to Q2	2:00.136	1	1
2	72	(Italy) Marco Bezzecchi	Aprilia Racing	Aprilia	Qualified to Q2	2:00.329	4 (Note: 2-place grid penalty on Sunday race due to impeding.)	2
3	37	(Spain) Pedro Acosta	Red Bull KTM Factory Racing	KTM	Qualified to Q2	2:00.485	2	1
4	63	(Italy) Francesco Bagnaia	Ducati Lenovo Team	Ducati	Qualified to Q2	2:00.563	3	1
5	36	(Spain) Joan Mir	Honda HRC Castrol	Honda	2:01.210	2:00.591	5	2
6	93	(Spain) Marc Márquez	Ducati Lenovo Team	Ducati	Qualified to Q2	2:00.637	6	2
7	89	(Spain) Jorge Martín	Aprilia Racing	Aprilia	Qualified to Q2	2:00.696	7	3
8	73	(Spain) Álex Márquez	BK8 Gresini Racing MotoGP	Ducati	Qualified to Q2	2:00.765	8	3
9	10	(Italy) Luca Marini	Honda HRC Castrol	Honda	Qualified to Q2	2:00.891	11	4
10	54	(Spain) Fermín Aldeguer	Pertamina Enduro VR46 Racing Team	Ducati	2:00.977	2:01.014	9	3
11	79	(Japan) Ai Ogura	Trackhouse MotoGP Team	Aprilia	Qualified to Q2	2:01.419	10	4
12	23	(Italy) Enea Bastianini	Red Bull KTM Tech3	KTM	Qualified to Q2	2:01.477	12	4
13	25	(Spain) Raúl Fernández	Trackhouse MotoGP Team	Aprilia	2:01.228	N/A	13	5
14	11	(Brazil) Diogo Moreira	Pro Honda LCR	Honda	2:01.306	N/A	14	5
15	5	(France) Johann Zarco	Castrol Honda LCR	Honda	2:01.445	N/A	15	5
16	20	(France) Fabio Quartararo	Monster Energy Yamaha MotoGP Team	Yamaha	2:01.553	N/A	16	6
17	7	(Turkey) Toprak Razgatlıoğlu	Prima Pramac Yamaha MotoGP	Yamaha	2:01.745	N/A	17	6
18	33	(South Africa) Brad Binder	Red Bull KTM Factory Racing	KTM	2:01.865	N/A	18	6
19	43	(Australia) Jack Miller	Prima Pramac Yamaha MotoGP	Yamaha	2:01.893	N/A	19	7
20	21	(Italy) Franco Morbidelli	Pertamina Enduro VR46 Racing Team	Ducati	2:02.117	N/A	20	7
21	42	(Spain) Álex Rins	Monster Energy Yamaha MotoGP Team	Yamaha	2:02.366	N/A	21	7
Official MotoGP Qualifying 1 Report
Official MotoGP Qualifying 2 Report
Official MotoGP Grid Report

=== Moto2 ===
Fastest session lap

Pos.	No.	Rider	Team	Constructor	Q1	Q2	Final grid	Row
1	7	(Belgium) Barry Baltus	Reds Fantic Racing	Kalex	Qualified to Q2	2:05.347	1	1
2	21	(Spain) Alonso López	Italjet Gresini Moto2	Kalex	Qualified to Q2	2:05.363	2	1
3	36	(Spain) Ángel Piqueras	QJMotor – Galfer – MSi	Kalex	2:05.911	2:05.454	3	1
4	13	(Italy) Celestino Vietti	HDR SpeedRS Team	Boscoscuro	Qualified to Q2	2:05.500	4	2
5	81	(Australia) Senna Agius	Liqui Moly Dynavolt Intact GP	Kalex	Qualified to Q2	2:05.524	5	2
6	11	(Spain) Álex Escrig	Klint Racing Team	Forward	2:06.197	2:05.535	6	2
7	28	(Spain) Izan Guevara	Blu Cru Pramac Yamaha Moto2	Boscoscuro	Qualified to Q2	2:05.569	7	3
8	95	(Netherlands) Collin Veijer	Red Bull KTM Ajo	Kalex	Qualified to Q2	2:05.596	8	3
9	18	(Spain) Manuel González	Liqui Moly Dynavolt Intact GP	Kalex	Qualified to Q2	2:05.803	9	3
10	16	(United States) Joe Roberts	OnlyFans American Racing Team	Kalex	Qualified to Q2	2:05.978	10	4
11	12	(Czech Republic) Filip Salac	OnlyFans American Racing Team	Kalex	Qualified to Q2	2:05.979	11	4
12	44	(Spain) Arón Canet	Elf Marc VDS Racing Team	Boscoscuro	2:06.236	2:06.147	12	4
13	14	(Italy) Tony Arbolino	Reds Fantic Racing	Kalex	Qualified to Q2	2:06.240	13	5
14	17	(Spain) Daniel Muñoz	Italtrans Racing Team	Kalex	Qualified to Q2	2:06.284	14	5
15	96	(Spain) Daniel Holgado	CFMoto Power Electronics Aspar Team	Kalex	2:05.814	2:06.472	15	5
16	99	(Spain) Adrián Huertas	Italtrans Racing Team	Kalex	Qualified to Q2	2:06.583	16	6
17	80	(Colombia) David Alonso	CFMoto Power Electronics Aspar Team	Kalex	Qualified to Q2	Lap times cancelled	17 (Note: Qualified first but got lap times cancelled due to a technical infringement.)	6
18	4	(Spain) Iván Ortolá	QJMotor – Galfer – MSi	Kalex	Qualified to Q2	No time set	18	6
19	64	(Indonesia) Mario Aji	Idemitsu Honda Team Asia	Kalex	2:06.594	N/A	19	7
20	54	(Spain) Alberto Ferrández	Blu Cru Pramac Yamaha Moto2	Boscoscuro	2:06.835	N/A	20	7
21	71	(Japan) Ayumu Sasaki	Momoven Idrofoglia RW Racing Team	Kalex	2:06.915	N/A	21	7
22	9	(Spain) Jorge Navarro	Klint Racing Team	Forward	2:06.922	N/A	22	8
23	84	(Netherlands) Zonta van den Goorbergh	Momoven Idrofoglia RW Racing Team	Kalex	2:07.022	N/A	23	8
24	72	(Japan) Taiyo Furusato	Idemitsu Honda Team Asia	Kalex	2:07.167	N/A	24	8
25	3	(Spain) Sergio García	Italjet Gresini Moto2	Kalex	2:07.188	N/A	25	9
26	53	(Turkey) Deniz Öncü	Elf Marc VDS Racing Team	Boscoscuro	2:07.260	N/A	26	9
27	8	(Italy) Dennis Foggia	HDR SpeedRS Team	Boscoscuro	2:07.406	N/A	27	9
28	98	(Spain) José Antonio Rueda	Red Bull KTM Ajo	Kalex	2:07.439	N/A	28	10
Official Moto2 Qualifying 1 Report
Official Moto2 Qualifying 2 Report
Official Moto2 Grid Report

=== Moto3 ===
Fastest session lap

Pos.	No.	Rider	Team	Constructor	Q1	Q2	Final grid	Row
1	83	(Spain) Álvaro Carpe	Red Bull KTM Ajo	KTM	Qualified to Q2	2:12.107	1	1
2	67	(Republic of Ireland) Casey O'Gorman	Sic58 Squadra Corse	Honda	Qualified to Q2	2:12.519	2	1
3	73	(Argentina) Valentín Perrone	Red Bull KTM Tech3	KTM	Qualified to Q2	2:12.526	3	1
4	9	(Indonesia) Veda Pratama	Honda Team Asia	Honda	Qualified to Q2	2:12.813	4	2
5	94	(Italy) Guido Pini	Leopard Racing	Honda	Qualified to Q2	2:12.837	5	2
6	78	(Spain) Joel Esteban	LevelUp – MTA	KTM	Qualified to Q2	2:12.869	6	2
7	31	(Spain) Adrián Fernández	Leopard Racing	Honda	Qualified to Q2	2:12.917	7	3
8	28	(Spain) Máximo Quiles	CFMoto Valresa Aspar Team	KTM	Qualified to Q2	2:12.996	8	3
9	27	(Finland) Rico Salmela	Red Bull KTM Tech3	KTM	Qualified to Q2	2:13.005	9	3
10	19	(United Kingdom) Scott Ogden	CIP Green Power	KTM	2:14.137	2:13.244	10	4
11	66	(Australia) Joel Kelso	Gryd – MLav Racing	Honda	Qualified to Q2	2:13.324	11	4
12	32	(Japan) Zen Mitani	Honda Team Asia	Honda	2:14.142	2:13.534	12	4
13	18	(Italy) Matteo Bertelle	LevelUp – MTA	KTM	Qualified to Q2	2:13.554	13	5
14	51	(Spain) Brian Uriarte	Red Bull KTM Ajo	KTM	Qualified to Q2	2:13.561	14	5
15	11	(Spain) Adrián Cruces	CIP Green Power	KTM	2:14.202	2:13.651	15	5
16	10	(Italy) Nicola Carraro	Rivacold Snipers Team	Honda	2:14.401	2:13.663	16	6
17	8	(United Kingdom) Eddie O'Shea	Gryd – MLav Racing	Honda	Qualified to Q2	2:13.688	17	6
18	97	(Argentina) Marco Morelli	CFMoto Valresa Aspar Team	KTM	Qualified to Q2	2:14.646	18	6
19	6	(Japan) Ryusei Yamanaka	Aeon Credit – MT Helmets – MSi	KTM	2:14.609	N/A	19	7
20	54	(Spain) Jesús Ríos	Rivacold Snipers Team	Honda	2:14.611	N/A	20	7
21	88	(Spain) Marcos Uriarte	Liqui Moly Dynavolt Intact GP	KTM	2:14.723	N/A	21	7
22	14	(New Zealand) Cormac Buchanan	Code Motorsports	KTM	2:14.950	N/A	22	8
23	21	(South Africa) Ruché Moodley	Code Motorsports	KTM	2:15.080	N/A	23	8
24	5	(Austria) Leo Rammerstorfer	Sic58 Squadra Corse	Honda	2:15.595	N/A	24	8
25	13	(Malaysia) Hakim Danish	Aeon Credit – MT Helmets – MSi	KTM	No time set	N/A	25	9
Official Moto3 Qualifying 1 Report
Official Moto3 Qualifying 2 Report
Official Moto3 Grid Report

== MotoGP Sprint ==
The MotoGP Sprint was held on March 28, 2026.

Pos.	No.	Rider	Team	Manufacturer	Laps	Time/Retired	Grid	Points
1	89	(Spain) Jorge Martín	Aprilia Racing	Aprilia	10	20:19.546	7	12
2	63	(Italy) Francesco Bagnaia	Ducati Lenovo Team	Ducati	10	+0.755	4	9
3	23	(Italy) Enea Bastianini	Red Bull KTM Tech3	KTM	10	+3.199	12	7
4	73	(Spain) Álex Márquez	BK8 Gresini Racing MotoGP	Ducati	10	+3.638	8	6
5	10	(Italy) Luca Marini	Honda HRC Castrol	Honda	10	+5.521	9	5
6	79	(Japan) Ai Ogura	Trackhouse MotoGP Team	Aprilia	10	+7.183	11	4
7	25	(Spain) Raúl Fernández	Trackhouse MotoGP Team	Aprilia	10	+8.634	13	3
8	37	(Spain) Pedro Acosta	Red Bull KTM Factory Racing	KTM	10	+10.484 (Note: 8-second penalty due to low tyre pressure.)	3	2
9	5	(France) Johann Zarco	Castrol Honda LCR	Honda	10	+10.574	15	1
10	54	(Spain) Fermín Aldeguer	BK8 Gresini Racing MotoGP	Ducati	10	+12.860	10	
11	20	(France) Fabio Quartararo	Monster Energy Yamaha MotoGP Team	Yamaha	10	+13.757	16	
12	33	(South Africa) Brad Binder	Red Bull KTM Factory Racing	KTM	10	+14.567	18	
13	21	(Italy) Franco Morbidelli	Pertamina Enduro VR46 Racing Team	Ducati	10	+16.019	20	
14	43	(Australia) Jack Miller	Prima Pramac Yamaha MotoGP	Yamaha	10	+17.006	19	
15	36	(Spain) Joan Mir	Honda HRC Castrol	Honda	10	+18.785	5	
16	42	(Spain) Álex Rins	Monster Energy Yamaha MotoGP Team	Yamaha	10	+51.120	21	
17	93	(Spain) Marc Márquez	Ducati Lenovo Team	Ducati	9	+1 lap	6	
Ret	72	(Italy) Marco Bezzecchi	Aprilia Racing	Aprilia	7	Accident	2	
Ret	7	(Turkey) Toprak Razgatlıoğlu	Prima Pramac Yamaha MotoGP	Yamaha	4	Technical	17	
Ret	49	(Italy) Fabio Di Giannantonio	Pertamina Enduro VR46 Racing Team	Ducati	4	Collision damage	1	
Ret	11	(Brazil) Diogo Moreira	Pro Honda LCR	Honda	3	Clutch	14	
DNS	12	(Spain) Maverick Viñales	Red Bull KTM Tech3	KTM		Did not start		
Fastest sprint lap: (Spain) Jorge Martín (Aprilia) – 2:01.268 (lap 2)
Official MotoGP Sprint Report

== Race ==
=== MotoGP ===
Pos.	No.	Rider	Team	Manufacturer	Laps	Time/Retired	Grid	Points
1	72	(Italy) Marco Bezzecchi	Aprilia Racing	Aprilia	20	40:50.653	4	25
2	89	(Spain) Jorge Martín	Aprilia Racing	Aprilia	20	+2.036	7	20
3	37	(Spain) Pedro Acosta	Red Bull KTM Factory Racing	KTM	20	+4.497	2	16
4	49	(Italy) Fabio Di Giannantonio	Pertamina Enduro VR46 Racing Team	Ducati	20	+6.972	1	13
5	93	(Spain) Marc Márquez	Ducati Lenovo Team	Ducati	20	+8.100	6	11
6	23	(Italy) Enea Bastianini	Red Bull KTM Tech3	KTM	20	+8.243	12	10
7	73	(Spain) Álex Márquez	BK8 Gresini Racing MotoGP	Ducati	20	+11.253	8	9
8	25	(Spain) Raúl Fernández	Trackhouse MotoGP Team	Aprilia	20	+13.129	13	8
9	10	(Italy) Luca Marini	Honda HRC Castrol	Honda	20	+14.471	11	7
10	63	(Italy) Francesco Bagnaia	Ducati Lenovo Team	Ducati	20	+14.544	3	6
11	54	(Spain) Fermín Aldeguer	BK8 Gresini Racing MotoGP	Ducati	20	+21.063	9	5
12	33	(South Africa) Brad Binder	Red Bull KTM Factory Racing	KTM	20	+22.062	18	4
13	11	(Brazil) Diogo Moreira	Pro Honda LCR	Honda	20	+22.201	14	3
14	21	(Italy) Franco Morbidelli	Pertamina Enduro VR46 Racing Team	Ducati	20	+24.371	20	2
15	7	(Turkey) Toprak Razgatlıoğlu	Prima Pramac Yamaha MotoGP	Yamaha	20	+25.549	17	1
16	43	(Australia) Jack Miller	Prima Pramac Yamaha MotoGP	Yamaha	20	+26.309	19	
17	20	(France) Fabio Quartararo	Monster Energy Yamaha MotoGP Team	Yamaha	20	+27.136	16	
18	42	(Spain) Álex Rins	Monster Energy Yamaha MotoGP Team	Yamaha	20	+38.701	21	
Ret	5	(France) Johann Zarco	Castrol Honda LCR	Honda	18	Accident damage	15	
Ret	79	(Japan) Ai Ogura	Trackhouse MotoGP Team	Aprilia	15	Technical	10	
Ret	36	(Spain) Joan Mir	Honda HRC Castrol	Honda	5	Accident	5	
DNS	12	(Spain) Maverick Viñales	Red Bull KTM Tech3	KTM		Did not start		
Fastest lap: (Japan) Ai Ogura (Aprilia) – 2:02.037 (lap 9)
Official MotoGP Race Report

=== Moto2 ===
The race was scheduled to contest 16 laps, but was red-flagged following a multi-rider crash on the opening lap. The race was subsequently restarted and reduced to 10 laps.

Pos.	No.	Rider	Team	Manufacturer	Laps	Time/Retired	Grid	Points
1	81	(Australia) Senna Agius	Liqui Moly Dynavolt Intact GP	Kalex	10	21:10.744	5	25
1	13	(Italy) Celestino Vietti	HDR SpeedRS Team	Boscoscuro	10	+0.497	4	20
3	28	(Spain) Izan Guevara	Blu Cru Pramac Yamaha Moto2	Boscoscuro	10	+0.908	7	16
4	80	(Colombia) David Alonso	CFMoto Power Electronics Aspar Team	Kalex	10	+1.843	17	13
5	18	(Spain) Manuel González	Liqui Moly Dynavolt Intact GP	Kalex	10	+2.729	9	11
6	7	(Belgium) Barry Baltus	Reds Fantic Racing	Kalex	10	+3.251	1	10
7	21	(Spain) Alonso López	Italjet Gresini Moto2	Kalex	10	+5.003	2	9
8	11	(Spain) Álex Escrig	Klint Racing Team	Forward	10	+6.830	6	8
9	16	(United States) Joe Roberts	OnlyFans American Racing Team	Kalex	10	+7.761	10	7
10	14	(Italy) Tony Arbolino	Reds Fantic Racing	Kalex	10	+8.740	13	6
11	4	(Spain) Iván Ortolá	QJMotor – Galfer – MSi	Kalex	10	+11.485	18	5
12	99	(Spain) Adrián Huertas	Italtrans Racing Team	Kalex	10	+11.828	16	4
13	44	(Spain) Arón Canet	Elf Marc VDS Racing Team	Boscoscuro	10	+12.152	12	3
14	17	(Spain) Daniel Muñoz	Italtrans Racing Team	Kalex	10	+14.246	14	2
15	98	(Spain) José Antonio Rueda	Red Bull KTM Ajo	Kalex	10	+20.119	28	1
16	96	(Spain) Daniel Holgado	CFMoto Power Electronics Aspar Team	Kalex	10	+21.206	15	
17	71	(Japan) Ayumu Sasaki	Momoven Idrofoglia RW Racing Team	Kalex	10	+25.265 (Note: 6-second penalty for failing to comply with double long lap penalty.)	21	
18	72	(Japan) Taiyo Furusato	Idemitsu Honda Team Asia	Kalex	10	+26.356	24	
19	8	(Italy) Dennis Foggia	HDR SpeedRS Team	Boscoscuro	10	+26.488	27	
20	53	(Turkey) Deniz Öncü	Elf Marc VDS Racing Team	Boscoscuro	10	+31.146	26	
21	12	(Czech Republic) Filip Salač	OnlyFans American Racing Team	Kalex	10	+32.370	11	
22	84	(Netherlands) Zonta van den Goorbergh	Momoven Idrofoglia RW Racing Team	Kalex	8	+2 laps	23	
Ret	64	(Indonesia) Mario Aji	Idemitsu Honda Team Asia	Kalex	8	Accident	19	
Ret	95	(Netherlands) Collin Veijer	Red Bull KTM Ajo	Kalex	3	Accident	8	
Ret	9	(Spain) Jorge Navarro	Klint Racing Team	Forward	3	Accident	22	
DNS	36	(Spain) Ángel Piqueras	QJMotor – Galfer – MSi	Kalex	0	Did not restart	3	
DNS	54	(Spain) Alberto Ferrández	Blu Cru Pramac Yamaha Moto2	Boscoscuro	0	Did not restart	20	
DNS	3	(Spain) Sergio García	Italjet Gresini Moto2	Kalex	0	Did not restart	25	
Fastest lap: (Colombia) David Alonso (Kalex) – 2:06.456 (lap 6)
Official Moto2 Race Report

=== Moto3 ===
Pos.	No.	Rider	Team	Manufacturer	Laps	Time/Retired	Grid	Points
1	94	(Italy) Guido Pini	Leopard Racing	Honda	14	31:20.489	5	25
2	28	(Spain) Máximo Quiles	CFMoto Valresa Aspar Team	KTM	14	+0.056	8	20
3	83	(Spain) Álvaro Carpe	Red Bull KTM Ajo	Kalex	14	+0.254	1	16
4	73	(Argentina) Valentín Perrone	Red Bull KTM Tech3	KTM	14	+0.445	3	13
5	31	(Spain) Adrián Fernández (Note: Originally finished fifth but was disqualified from the first six races of the season for engine tampering. However, his team Leopard Racing appealed the disqualification and won the appeal verdict, thus reinstating his results in the first six races.)	Leopard Racing	Honda	14	+9.192	7	11
6	27	(Finland) Rico Salmela	Red Bull KTM Tech3	KTM	14	+15.075	9	10
7	51	(Spain) Brian Uriarte	Red Bull KTM Ajo	KTM	14	+15.105	14	9
8	11	(Spain) Adrián Cruces	CIP Green Power	KTM	14	+14.914 (Note: 2-place penalty for irresponsible riding.)	15	8
9	18	(Italy) Matteo Bertelle	LevelUp – MTA	KTM	14	+15.240	13	7
10	19	(United Kingdom) Scott Ogden	CIP Green Power	KTM	14	+15.570	10	6
11	8	(United Kingdom) Eddie O'Shea	Gryd – MLav Racing	Honda	14	+16.204	17	5
12	97	(Argentina) Marco Morelli	CFMoto Valresa Aspar Team	KTM	14	+17.274	18	4
13	13	(Malaysia) Hakim Danish	Aeon Credit – MT Helmets – MSi	KTM	14	+18.513	25	3
14	88	(Spain) Marcos Uriarte	Liqui Moly Dynavolt Intact GP	KTM	14	+20.559	21	2
15	54	(Spain) Jesús Ríos	Rivacold Snipers Team	Honda	14	+27.200	20	1
16	21	(South Africa) Ruché Moodley	Code Motorsports	KTM	14	+28.093	23	
17	10	(Italy) Nicola Carraro	Rivacold Snipers Team	Honda	14	+28.099	16	
18	6	(Japan) Ryusei Yamanaka	Aeon Credit – MT Helmets – MSi	KTM	14	+28.332	19	
19	14	(New Zealand) Cormac Buchanan	Code Motorsports	KTM	14	+37.244	22	
20	5	(Austria) Leo Rammerstorfer	Sic58 Squadra Corse	Honda	14	+1:01.694	24	
Ret	32	(Japan) Zen Mitani	Honda Team Asia	Honda	13	Technical	12	
Ret	67	(Republic of Ireland) Casey O'Gorman	Sic58 Squadra Corse	Honda	11	Accident	2	
Ret	78	(Spain) Joel Esteban	LevelUp – MTA	KTM	9	Accident damage	6	
Ret	66	(Australia) Joel Kelso	Gryd – MLav Racing	Honda	8	Accident	11	
Ret	9	(Indonesia) Veda Pratama	Honda Team Asia	Honda	4	Accident	4	
Fastest lap: (Italy) Guido Pini (Honda) – 2:13.417 (lap 6)
Official Moto3 Race Report

== Championship standings after the race ==
Below are the standings for the top five riders, constructors, and teams after the round.

=== MotoGP ===
Riders' Championship standings

Pos.	Rider	Points
1	(Italy) Marco Bezzecchi	81
2	(Spain) Jorge Martín	77
3	(Spain) Pedro Acosta	60
4	(Italy) Fabio Di Giannantonio	50
5	(Spain) Marc Márquez	45

Constructors' Championship standings

Pos.	Constructor	Points
1	(Italy) Aprilia	101
2	(Italy) Ducati	69
3	(Austria) KTM	65
4	(Japan) Honda	28
5	(Japan) Yamaha	9

Teams' Championship standings

	Pos.	Team	Points
	1	(Italy) Aprilia Racing	158
1	2	(Austria) Red Bull KTM Factory Racing	77
1	3	(United States) Trackhouse MotoGP Team	77
1	4	(Italy) Ducati Lenovo Team	70
1	5	(Italy) Pertamina Enduro VR46 Racing Team	64

=== Moto2 ===
Riders' Championship standings

	Pos.	Rider	Points
1	1	(Spain) Manuel González	39.5
2	2	(Spain) Izan Guevara	36
2	3	(Spain) Daniel Holgado	33
4	4	(Italy) Celestino Vietti	32
2	5	(Spain) Daniel Muñoz	26

Constructors' Championship standings

Pos.	Constructor	Points
1	(Germany) Kalex	62.5
2	(Italy) Boscoscuro	40
3	(Switzerland) Forward	23

Teams' Championship standings

	Pos.	Team	Points
1	1	(Germany) Liqui Moly Dynavolt Intact GP	64.5
1	2	(Spain) CFMoto Power Electronics Aspar Team	57
1	3	(Italy) Blu Cru Pramac Yamaha Moto2	36.5
1	4	(Italy) Italtrans Racing Team	34
4	5	(Italy) HDR SpeedRS Team	32

=== Moto3 ===
Riders' Championship standings

	Pos.	Rider	Points
	1	(Spain) Máximo Quiles	65
2	2	(Spain) Álvaro Carpe	42
3	3	(Argentina) Valentín Perrone	38
6	4	(Italy) Guido Pini	36
3	5	(Argentina) Marco Morelli	32

Constructors' Championship standings

Pos.	Constructor	Points
1	(Austria) KTM	70
2	(Japan) Honda	52

Teams' Championship standings

	Pos.	Team	Points
	1	(Spain) CFMoto Valresa Aspar Team	97
3	2	(Luxembourg) Leopard Racing	65
1	3	(Finland) Red Bull KTM Ajo	65
1	4	(France) Red Bull KTM Tech3	58
1	5	(Germany) Liqui Moly Dynavolt Intact GP	33

== Notes ==
Previous race: 2026 Brazilian Grand Prix	FIM Grand Prix World Championship; 2026 season	Next race: 2026 Spanish Grand Prix
Previous race: 2013 United States Grand Prix	United States motorcycle Grand Prix	Next race: 2027 United States Grand Prix
