= 2026 Qatar motorcycle Grand Prix =

Motorcycle races in Lusail

2026 Qatar Grand Prix
Race details
- Race 20 of 22 races in the 2026 Grand Prix motorcycle racing season
- Date: 8 November 2026
- Official name: Qatar Airways Grand Prix of Qatar
- Location: Lusail International Circuit; Lusail, Qatar
- Course: Permanent racing facility; 5.380 km (3.343 mi)

MotoGP
Pole position
Rider	(Italy) Marco Bezzecchi	Aprilia
Time	1:50.028	
Fastest lap
Rider	(Spain) Marc Márquez	Ducati
Time	1:52.558 on lap 13	
Podium
First	(Italy) Marco Bezzecchi	Aprilia
Second	(Spain) Marc Márquez	Ducati
Third	(Spain) Raúl Fernández	Aprilia

Moto2
Pole position
Rider	(Spain) Álex Escrig	Forward
Time	1:55.241	
Fastest lap
Rider	(Spain) Iván Ortolá	Kalex
Time	1:56.488 on lap 5	
Podium
First	(Spain) Daniel Holgado	Kalex
Second	(Spain) Iván Ortolá	Kalex
Third	(Spain) Álex Escrig	Forward

Moto3
Pole position
Rider	(Spain) Máximo Quiles	KTM
Time	2:02.288	
Fastest lap
Rider	(Spain) David Almansa	KTM
Time	2:03.249 on lap 2	
Podium
First	(Spain) David Almansa	KTM
Second	(Spain) Adrián Fernández	Honda
Third	(Spain) Máximo Quiles	KTM

The 2026 Qatar motorcycle Grand Prix (officially known as the Qatar Airways Grand Prix of Qatar) was the twentieth round of the 2026 Grand Prix motorcycle racing season. All races were held at the Lusail International Circuit in Lusail on 8 November 2026. Initially scheduled for 12 April, the race was moved to 8 November due to the Iran war.

In the MotoGP class, Yamaha as a constructor withdrew from the race over safety concerns from the Iran war. The two teams using Yamaha motorcycles, namely Monster Energy Yamaha MotoGP Team and the Prima Pramac Yamaha MotoGP, did not arrive the Grand Prix as a result. Álex Márquez also missed the race, as he was set to undergo surgery on his shoulder that was originally planned for the end of the season. He was replaced by Superbike rider Iker Lecuona. Joan Mir also missed the race as he is continuing his recovery from an injury. He was replaced by Jake Dixon.

In the Moto3 class, CFMoto Aspar Team secured enough points to clinch their third Teams' Championship.

== Practice session ==
=== MotoGP ===
The top 10 riders (written in bold) qualified for Q2.

Pos.	No.	Rider	Team	Manufacturer	Laptime
1	49	**(Italy) Fabio Di Giannantonio**	**Pertamina Enduro VR46 Racing Team**	**Ducati**	**1:50.406**
2	93	**(Spain) Marc Márquez**	**Ducati Lenovo Team**	**Ducati**	1:50.548
3	72	**(Italy) Marco Bezzecchi**	**Aprilia Racing**	**Aprilia**	1:50.666
4	63	**(Italy) Francesco Bagnaia**	**Ducati Lenovo Team**	**Ducati**	1:50.792
5	25	**(Spain) Raúl Fernández**	**Superfile Trackhouse MotoGP Team**	**Aprilia**	1:51.014
6	23	**(Italy) Enea Bastianini**	**Red Bull KTM Tech3**	**KTM**	1:51.024
7	89	**(Spain) Jorge Martín**	**Aprilia Racing**	**Aprilia**	1:51.041
8	5	**(France) Johann Zarco**	**Castrol Honda LCR**	**Honda**	1:51.301
9	79	**(Japan) Ai Ogura**	**Superfile Trackhouse MotoGP Team**	**Aprilia**	1:51.318
10	33	**(South Africa) Brad Binder**	**Red Bull KTM Factory Racing**	**KTM**	1:51.409
11	54	(Spain) Fermín Aldeguer	Gresini Racing MotoGP	Ducati	1:51.447
12	21	(Italy) Franco Morbidelli	Pertamina Enduro VR46 Racing Team	Ducati	1:51.484
13	10	(Italy) Luca Marini	Honda HRC Castrol	Honda	1:51.548
14	37	(Spain) Pedro Acosta	Red Bull KTM Factory Racing	KTM	1:51.575
15	12	(Spain) Maverick Viñales	Red Bull KTM Tech3	KTM	1:51.653
16	73	(Spain) Iker Lecuona	Gresini Racing MotoGP	Ducati	1:51.730
17	11	(Brazil) Diogo Moreira	Pro Honda LCR	Honda	1:52.192
18	96	(United Kingdom) Jake Dixon	Honda HRC Castrol	Honda	1:52.393
Official MotoGP Practice Report

== Qualifying ==
=== MotoGP ===
Pos.	No.	Rider	Team	Manufacturer	Laptime
1	72	(Italy) Marco Bezzecchi	Aprilia Racing	Aprilia	1:50.028
2	93	(Spain) Marc Márquez	Ducati Lenovo Team	Ducati	1:50.294
3	49	(Italy) Fabio Di Giannantonio	Pertamina Enduro VR46 Racing Team	Ducati	1:50.327
4	25	(Spain) Raúl Fernández	Superfile Trackhouse MotoGP Team	Aprilia	1:50.457
5	63	(Italy) Francesco Bagnaia	Ducati Lenovo Team	Ducati	1:50.592
6	79	(Japan) Ai Ogura	Superfile Trackhouse MotoGP Team	Aprilia	1:50.596
7	5	(France) Johann Zarco	Castrol Honda LCR	Honda	1:50.735
8	37	(Spain) Pedro Acosta	Red Bull KTM Factory Racing	KTM	1:50.872
9	54	(Spain) Fermín Aldeguer	Gresini Racing MotoGP	Ducati	1:50.890
10	23	(Italy) Enea Bastianini	Red Bull KTM Tech3	KTM	1:51.001
11	89	(Spain) Jorge Martín	Aprilia Racing	Aprilia	1:51.064
12	33	(South Africa) Brad Binder	Red Bull KTM Factory Racing	KTM	1:51.904
13	21	(Italy) Franco Morbidelli	Pertamina Enduro VR46 Racing Team	Ducati	1:51.484
14	10	(Italy) Luca Marini	Honda HRC Castrol	Honda	1:51.548
15	73	(Spain) Iker Lecuona	Gresini Racing MotoGP	Ducati	1:51.730
16	11	(Brazil) Diogo Moreira	Pro Honda LCR	Honda	1:52.192
17	96	(United Kingdom) Jake Dixon	Honda HRC Castrol	Honda	1:52.393
18	12	(Spain) Maverick Viñales	Red Bull KTM Tech3	KTM	1:51.653
Official MotoGP Qualifying Report

== MotoGP Sprint ==
The MotoGP Sprint was held on 7 November 2026.

Pos.	No.	Rider	Team	Manufacturer	Laps	Time/Retired	Grid	Points
1	93	(Spain) Marc Márquez	Ducati Lenovo Team	Ducati	10	18:46.450	2	12
2	49	(Italy) Fabio Di Giannantonio	Pertamina Enduro VR46 Racing Team	Ducati	10	+0.862	3	9
3	89	(Spain) Jorge Martín	Aprilia Racing	Aprilia	10	+1.159	11	7
4	25	(Spain) Raúl Fernández	Superfile Trackhouse MotoGP Team	Aprilia	10	+2.700	4	6
5	5	(France) Johann Zarco	Castrol Honda LCR	Honda	10	+3.720	7	5
6	37	(Spain) Pedro Acosta	Red Bull KTM Factory Racing	KTM	10	+4.664	8	4
7	79	(Japan) Ai Ogura	Superfile Trackhouse MotoGP Team	Aprilia	10	+4.858	6	3
8	23	(Italy) Enea Bastianini	Red Bull KTM Tech3	KTM	10	+5.582	10	2
9	73	(Spain) Iker Lecuona	Gresini Racing MotoGP	Ducati	10	+8.082	15	1
10	11	(Brazil) Diogo Moreira	Pro Honda LCR	Honda	10	+9.220	16	
11	54	(Spain) Fermín Aldeguer	Gresini Racing MotoGP	Ducati	10	+9.429	9	
12	33	(South Africa) Brad Binder	Red Bull KTM Factory Racing	KTM	10	+9.483	12	
13	10	(Italy) Luca Marini	Honda HRC Castrol	Honda	10	+12.727	14	
14	21	(Italy) Franco Morbidelli	Pertamina Enduro VR46 Racing Team	Ducati	10	+12.874	13	
15	12	(Spain) Maverick Viñales	Red Bull KTM Tech3	KTM	10	+13.483	18	
16	96	(United Kingdom) Jake Dixon	Honda HRC Castrol	Honda	10	+19.373	17	
Ret	72	(Italy) Marco Bezzecchi	Aprilia Racing	Aprilia	4	Accident	1	
DNS	63	(Italy) Francesco Bagnaia	Ducati Lenovo Team	Ducati	0	Accident	5	
Fastest sprint lap: (Spain) Marc Márquez (Ducati) - 1:52.218 (lap 7)
Official MotoGP Sprint Report

== Race ==
=== MotoGP ===
Pos.	No.	Rider	Team	Manufacturer	Laps	Time/Retired	Grid	Points
1	72	(Italy) Marco Bezzecchi	Aprilia Racing	Aprilia	22	41:29.173	1	25
2	93	(Spain) Marc Márquez	Ducati Lenovo Team	Ducati	22	+3.083	2	20
3	25	(Spain) Raúl Fernández	Superfile Trackhouse MotoGP Team	Aprilia	22	+3.614	4	16
4	79	(Japan) Ai Ogura	Superfile Trackhouse MotoGP Team	Aprilia	22	+4.885	6	13
5	23	(Italy) Enea Bastianini	Red Bull KTM Tech3	KTM	22	+6.948	10	11
6	37	(Spain) Pedro Acosta	Red Bull KTM Factory Racing	KTM	22	+7.413	8	10
7	89	(Spain) Jorge Martín	Aprilia Racing	Aprilia	22	+14.023	11	9
8	49	(Italy) Fabio Di Giannantonio	Pertamina Enduro VR46 Racing Team	Ducati	22	+15.517	3	8
9	5	(France) Johann Zarco	Castrol Honda LCR	Honda	22	+16.257	7	7
10	73	(Spain) Iker Lecuona	Gresini Racing MotoGP	Ducati	22	+17.958	15	6
11	21	(Italy) Franco Morbidelli	Pertamina Enduro VR46 Racing Team	Ducati	22	+20.275	13	5
12	54	(Spain) Fermín Aldeguer	Gresini Racing MotoGP	Ducati	22	20.576	9	4
13	12	(Spain) Maverick Viñales	Red Bull KTM Tech3	KTM	22	+21.095	18	3
14	96	(United Kingdom) Jake Dixon	Honda HRC Castrol	Honda	22	+28.734	17	2
Ret	33	(South Africa) Brad Binder	Red Bull KTM Factory Racing	KTM	16	Retired	12	
Ret	11	(Brazil) Diogo Moreira	Pro Honda LCR	Honda	15	Retired	16	
DNS	63	(Italy) Francesco Bagnaia	Ducati Lenovo Team	Ducati	—	Crash in Sprint	—	
Fastest lap: (Spain) Marc Márquez (Ducati) - 1:52.558 (lap 13)
Official MotoGP Race Report

== Championship standings after the race ==
Below are the standings for the top five riders, constructors, and teams after the round.

=== MotoGP ===
Riders' Championship standings

Pos.	Rider	Points
1	(Spain) Marc Márquez	431
2	(Spain) Jorge Martín	371
3	(Italy) Marco Bezzecchi	357
4	(Spain) Pedro Acosta	309
5	(Japan) Ai Ogura	294

Constructors' Championship standings

Pos.	Constructor	Points
1	(Italy) Ducati	569
2	(Italy) Aprilia	561
3	(Austria) KTM	363
4	(Japan) Honda	190
5	(Japan) Yamaha	105

Teams' Championship standings

	Pos.	Team	Points
	1	(Italy) Aprilia Racing	728
	2	(Italy) Ducati Lenovo Team	604
	3	(United States) SuperFile Trackhouse MotoGP Team	552
	4	(Austria) Red Bull KTM Factory Racing	427
1	5	(Italy) Pertamina Enduro VR46 Racing Team	352

=== Moto2 ===
Riders' Championship standings

	Pos.	Rider	Points
	1	(Spain) Manuel González	286.5
	2	(Spain) Izan Guevara	273
	3	(Spain) Iván Ortolá	219.5
1	4	(Spain) Daniel Holgado	215
1	5	(Colombia) David Alonso	204

Constructors' Championship standings

Pos.	Constructor	Points
1	(Germany) Kalex	442.5
2	(Italy) Boscoscuro	300
3	(Switzerland) Forward	85

Teams' Championship standings

Pos.	Team	Points
1	(Germany) Liqui Moly Dynavolt Intact GP	461.5
2	(Spain) CFMoto Power Electronics Aspar Team	419
3	(Italy) Blu Cru Pramac Yamaha Moto2	290.5
4	(Spain) QJMotor – MSi	239.5
5	(United States) OnlyFans American Racing Team	209

=== Moto3 ===
Riders' Championship standings

	Pos.	Rider	Points
	1	(Spain) Máximo Quiles	392
	2	(Spain) David Almansa	253
1	3	(Spain) Álvaro Carpe	216
1	4	(Spain) Brian Uriarte	207
	5	(Spain) Adrián Fernández	177

Constructors' Championship standings

Pos.	Constructor	Points
1	(Austria) KTM	470
2	(Japan) Honda	253

Teams' Championship standings

Pos.	Team	Points
1	(Spain) CFMoto Gaviota Aspar Team	533
2	(Finland) Red Bull KTM Ajo	423
3	(Germany) Liqui Moly Dynavolt Intact GP	337
4	(Luxembourg) Leopard Racing	263
5	(France) Red Bull KTM Tech3	214

Previous race: 2026 Malaysian Grand Prix	FIM Grand Prix World Championship; 2026 season	Next race: 2026 Portuguese Grand Prix
Previous race: 2025 Qatar Grand Prix	Qatar motorcycle Grand Prix	Next race: 2027 Qatar Grand Prix
