= 2026 MotoGP World Championship =

78th running of the MotoGP World Championship

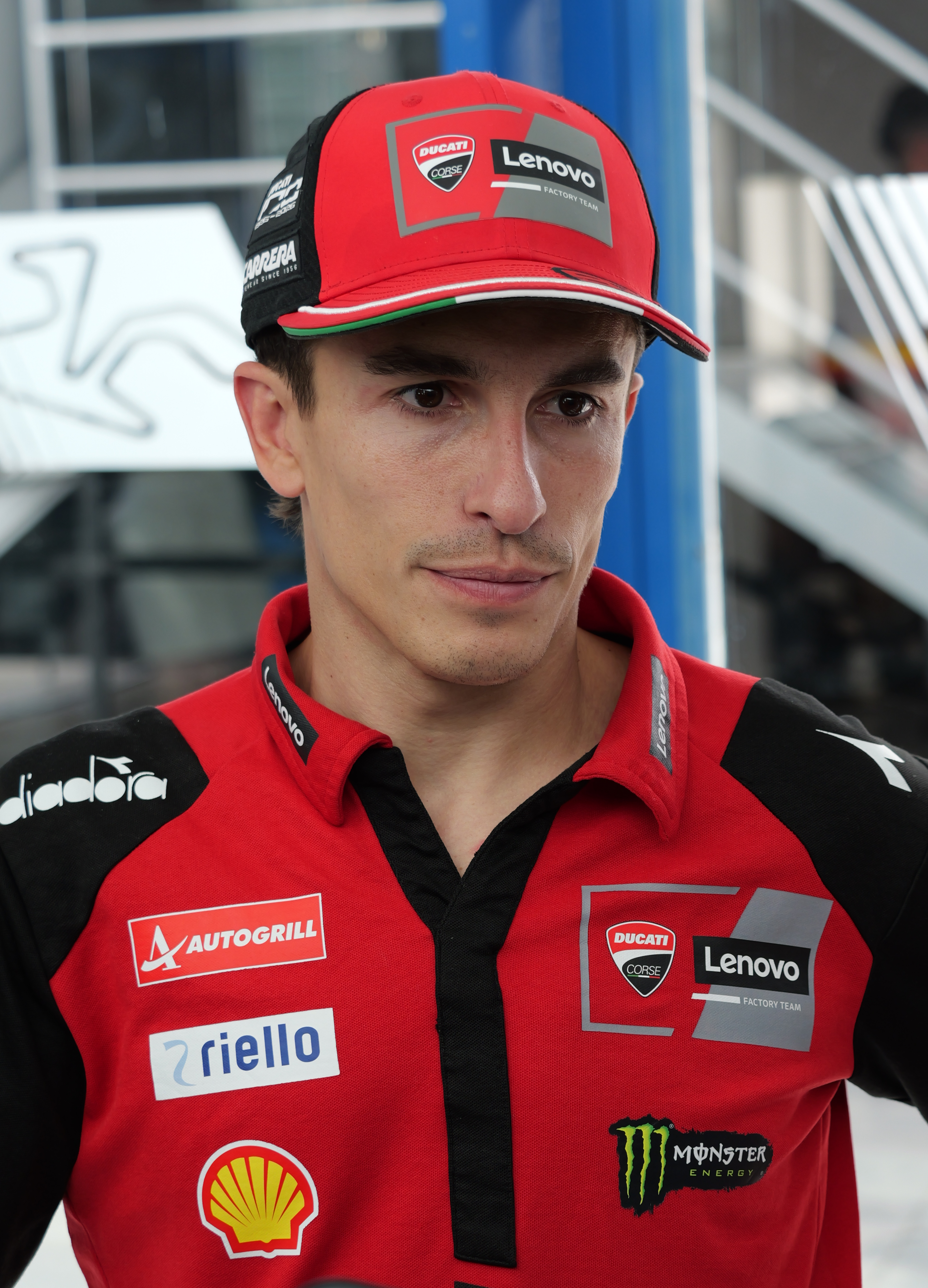
Marc Márquez was the 2026 MotoGP World Riders' Champion. His eighth premier class world title tied him with Giacomo Agostini.

The 2026 FIM MotoGP World Championship is the premier class of the 78th Fédération Internationale de Motocyclisme (FIM) Road Racing World Championship season, the highest level of competition in motorcycle road racing. It is the final season of the premier class using 1000cc engines and Michelin series-specified tyres, before switching to new 850cc engine regulations and tyres sourced from Pirelli, among other technical changes, from the 2027 season onwards.

MotoGP introduced a new support series starting in the 2026 season, the "Harley-Davidson Bagger World Cup", featuring bagger-style motorcycles modified for racing, competing in six selected rounds of the MotoGP calendar across Europe and North America.

== Season summary ==
Marco Bezzecchi took an early lead to the season with Aprilia, winning the first three Grands Prix, and four of the first seven, with an additional two runner-up finishes. However, poorer results in sprint races tempered his championship advantage. His teammate Jorge Martín took one Grand Prix victory in round 5 and a further three second-place finishes in the same span, as well as another two sprint victories. Álex Márquez (won in round 4) and Fabio Di Giannantonio (won in round 6) took the remaining two victories of the opening seven rounds.

Bezzecchi and Martín crashed out of the Hungarian Grand Prix after first lap contact with one another, and Bezzecchi was excluded from the Czech Grand Prix for assaulting a track marshal after crashing out of the sprint race, cutting his championship advantage. Defending champion Marc Márquez, who had won two of the early sprint races, missed the French and Catalan Grands Prix after fracturing his foot in a crash in the French sprint. However, he returned to form with a perfect weekend in Hungary, and added a sprint podium and Grand Prix win in Czechia, cutting his deficit to the leader to 40 points. The Dutch Grand Prix saw the most successful outing to date for the team Trackhouse Racing, going 1–2 in both the sprint and Grand Prix. Raúl Fernández won the sprint, while Ai Ogura took his maiden MotoGP-class victory. This was the first time a Japanese rider had won a MotoGP race since Makoto Tamada won the 2004 Japanese Grand Prix 22 years earlier. Bezzecchi crashed out on the second lap of the Grand Prix, earning zero points for the third consecutive Grand Prix and allowing teammate Martín to take over the championship lead with a 3rd place podium finish. Bezzecchi was ruled unfit to race after breaking his collarbone in a qualifying crash at the German Grand Prix in Sachsenring, further hindering his title campaign. Marc Márquez completed his first Grand Chelem of the season, and extended his record at the track to 10 MotoGP class victories, and 13 across all classes. Jorge Martín entered the summer break leading the championship with 208 points, ahead of Ai Ogura (194), Marc Márquez (190), Marco Bezzecchi (186), and Fabio Di Giannantonio (184). With just 24 points separating the top five after 11 rounds, the 2026 season had produced the closest top-five championship battle in MotoGP's modern era.

Returning to action at Silverstone, the weekend was dominated by Aprilia, who locked out the podium in both the sprint and main races. Factory rider Jorge Martín started from pole to take the sprint victory and 2nd place in the main race and extended his championship lead, while Trackhouse rider Raúl Fernández won the main race. Marc Márquez returned to form in Aragon, winning both the sprint and Grand Prix for the third consecutive year, while nearest rivals Marco Bezzecchi and Jorge Martín of Aprilia were limited to a third place podium double and a pair of fifth positions, respectively. At the San Marino Grand Prix, Márquez again swept both race wins, overtaking the championship lead for the first time in the season. In Austria, Martín won the sprint and followed with a Grand Prix podium to retake the championship lead. Pedro Acosta took his maiden Grand Prix victory in the MotoGP class, the first for KTM since the 2022 Thailand Grand Prix.

Marc Márquez opened the Asian leg of the season in Japan with a double victory, but polesitter Jorge Martín's pair of podium finishes kept him two points clear at the top of the championship standings, marking the narrowest championship lead after 16 rounds in the MotoGP era. Márquez briefly retook the championship lead with a sprint win in Indonesia, but was limited to sixth in the Grand Prix. Jorge Martín's podium finish in the Grand Prix reinstated his two point advantage in the championship, while Aprilia's lockout of the top four positions allowed them to retake the lead from Ducati for the constructors' championship. Márquez again stood atop the standings after the Australian round, where he took the sprint victory, while rival Martín crashed from second in a tight battle between the championship leaders. Martín suffered a forearm fracture in his crash, meaning he would sit out the Grand Prix, but inclement weather conditions ultimately led to a race cancellation. In Malaysia, Martín withdrew after the FP2 session due to difficulties with his injury, allowing Márquez to extend his advantage from 10 to 44 points with a sprint podium and a Grand Prix victory. In Qatar, no Yamaha teams or riders attended the Grand Prix, citing 'existing company-wide travel restrictions' due to the ongoing Iran war in the region. The sprint race was won by Marc Márquez after a clash with Marco Bezzecchi, while Jorge Martín rode through his injuries to clinch a podium position. Bezzecchi won the main race ahead of Márquez in second and Raúl Fernández in third.

In Portugal, Marc Márquez looked set to clinch the championship with a third place finish, before he crashed out on the penultimate lap of the sprint race, which was won by Marco Bezzecchi. While Aprilia riders Bezzecchi, Jorge Martín, and Raúl Fernández locked out the Grand Prix podium, Márquez's eighth-place finish was enough for him to be crowned the 2026 World Champion. It marked his eighth premier class title, equalling Giacomo Agostini's record, and his tenth world championship overall, surpassing Valentino Rossi's tally.

== Teams and riders ==
Team	Constructor	Motorcycle	No.	Rider	Rounds
(Italy) Aprilia Racing	Aprilia	RS-GP26	72	(Italy) Marco Bezzecchi	1–21
(Italy) Aprilia Racing	Aprilia	RS-GP26	89	(Spain) Jorge Martín	1–21
(Italy) Aprilia Racing	Aprilia	RS-GP26	32	(Italy) Lorenzo Savadori	4
(United States) SuperFile Trackhouse MotoGP Team (Note: For rounds 1–7, the team used the name Trackhouse MotoGP Team.)	Aprilia	RS-GP26	25	(Spain) Raúl Fernández	1–21
(United States) SuperFile Trackhouse MotoGP Team	Aprilia	RS-GP26	79	(Japan) Ai Ogura	1–12, 15–21
(United States) SuperFile Trackhouse MotoGP Team	Aprilia	RS-GP26	32	(Italy) Lorenzo Savadori	13
(Italy) Ducati Lenovo Team	Ducati	Desmosedici GP26	63	(Italy) Francesco Bagnaia	1–20
(Italy) Ducati Lenovo Team	Ducati	Desmosedici GP26	27	(Spain) Iker Lecuona	21
(Italy) Ducati Lenovo Team	Ducati	Desmosedici GP26	93	(Spain) Marc Márquez	1–5, 7–21
(Italy) BK8 Gresini Racing MotoGP	Ducati	Desmosedici GP25	54	(Spain) Fermín Aldeguer	2–10, 13–17, 20–21
(Italy) BK8 Gresini Racing MotoGP	Ducati	Desmosedici GP25	51	(Italy) Michele Pirro	1
(Italy) BK8 Gresini Racing MotoGP	Ducati	Desmosedici GP25	27	(Spain) Iker Lecuona	12, 18–19
(Italy) BK8 Gresini Racing MotoGP	Ducati	Desmosedici GP26	73	(Spain) Álex Márquez	1–6, 9–19, 21
(Italy) BK8 Gresini Racing MotoGP	Ducati	Desmosedici GP26	51	(Italy) Michele Pirro	7
(Italy) BK8 Gresini Racing MotoGP	Ducati	Desmosedici GP26	27	(Spain) Iker Lecuona	8, 20
(Italy) Pertamina Enduro VR46 Racing Team	Ducati	Desmosedici GP25	21	(Italy) Franco Morbidelli	1–21
(Italy) Pertamina Enduro VR46 Racing Team	Ducati	Desmosedici GP26	49	(Italy) Fabio Di Giannantonio	1–21
(Monaco) Castrol Honda LCR (Monaco) Pro Honda LCR	Honda	RC213V	5	(France) Johann Zarco	1–6, 13–21
(Monaco) Castrol Honda LCR (Monaco) Pro Honda LCR	Honda	RC213V	35	(United Kingdom) Cal Crutchlow	7–12
(Monaco) Castrol Honda LCR (Monaco) Pro Honda LCR	Honda	RC213V	11	(Brazil) Diogo Moreira	1–21
(Japan) Honda HRC Castrol (Note: Wildcard Takaaki Nakagami raced under the team name Honda HRC in round 16.)	Honda	RC213V	10	(Italy) Luca Marini	1–21
(Japan) Honda HRC Castrol	Honda	RC213V	36	(Spain) Joan Mir	1–14, 19
(Japan) Honda HRC Castrol	Honda	RC213V	30	(Japan) Takaaki Nakagami	15
(Japan) Honda HRC Castrol	Honda	RC213V	15	(Thailand) Somkiat Chantra	16
(Japan) Honda HRC Castrol	Honda	RC213V	41	(Spain) Aleix Espargaró	17
(Japan) Honda HRC Castrol	Honda	RC213V	96	(United Kingdom) Jake Dixon	20–21
(Japan) Honda HRC Castrol	Honda	RC213V	30	(Japan) Takaaki Nakagami	16
(Austria) Red Bull KTM Factory Racing	KTM	RC16	33	(South Africa) Brad Binder	1–21
(Austria) Red Bull KTM Factory Racing	KTM	RC16	37	(Spain) Pedro Acosta	1–21
(France) Red Bull KTM Tech3	KTM	RC16	12	(Spain) Maverick Viñales	1–3, 6–11, 16–21 (Note: Maverick Viñales was entered for the first Friday practice session during round 21, before being replaced by Pol Espargaró due to shoulder pain.)
(France) Red Bull KTM Tech3	KTM	RC16	94	(Germany) Jonas Folger	5
(France) Red Bull KTM Tech3	KTM	RC16	44	(Spain) Pol Espargaró	12–15, 21
(France) Red Bull KTM Tech3	KTM	RC16	23	(Italy) Enea Bastianini	1–21
(Japan) Monster Energy Yamaha MotoGP Team (Note: Wildcard Augusto Fernández raced under the team name Yamaha Factory Racing in rounds 4, 6, 10, and 12.)	Yamaha	YZR-M1	20	(France) Fabio Quartararo	1–19, 21 (Note: Yamaha did not attend the Qatar Grand Prix due to 'existing company-wide travel restrictions' citing potential dangers of the ongoing Iran war.)
(Japan) Monster Energy Yamaha MotoGP Team	Yamaha	YZR-M1	42	(Spain) Álex Rins	1–19, 21
(Japan) Monster Energy Yamaha MotoGP Team	Yamaha	YZR-M1	47	(Spain) Augusto Fernández	4, 6, 10, 12
(Italy) Prima Pramac Yamaha MotoGP	Yamaha	YZR-M1	7	(Turkey) Toprak Razgatlıoğlu	1–17
(Italy) Prima Pramac Yamaha MotoGP	Yamaha	YZR-M1	47	(Spain) Augusto Fernández	18–19, 21
(Italy) Prima Pramac Yamaha MotoGP	Yamaha	YZR-M1	43	(Australia) Jack Miller	1–19, 21

Key
Regular rider
Replacement rider
Wildcard rider

All teams used series-specified Michelin tyres.

=== Constructor changes ===
- Both Yamaha teams utilized the V4 version of their engine from 2026 for the first time in the MotoGP era as the YZR-M1 had been an inline-four specification since 2002.

=== Rider changes ===
- Three-time World Superbike Champion Toprak Razgatlıoğlu made his Grand Prix motorcycle racing debut with Prima Pramac Yamaha MotoGP. He replaces Miguel Oliveira, who was released from his contract a year early and replaced Razgatlıoğlu at ROKiT BMW Motorrad WorldSBK Team.
- Reigning Moto2 World Champion Diogo Moreira made his premier class debut with Pro Honda LCR replacing Somkiat Chantra, who is moving to Honda's World Superbike outfit.

==== Mid-season changes ====
- Fermín Aldeguer suffered a fractured femur during training and missed the first round in Thailand. He was replaced by Michele Pirro.
- After being declared not fully fit following surgery to remove screws from his shoulder, which has been suffering from ongoing injury since last year, Maverick Viñales was replaced by Jonas Folger at the French round.
- Álex Márquez suffered a broken collarbone and vertebra after an accident in Catalonia. He was replaced by Michele Pirro in Italy and then by Iker Lecuona in Hungary.
- Johann Zarco suffered injuries to the ligaments, meniscus, and fibula of his left leg following an accident in Catalonia. He was replaced by Cal Crutchlow between the Italian and British rounds.
- Maverick Viñales, still managing the effects of his injury, was replaced by Pol Espargaró between the British and Austrian rounds.
- Fermín Aldeguer suffered injuries to his back following an accident in practice in the Netherlands. He was replaced by Iker Lecuona in the United Kingdom.
- Ai Ogura suffered an injury to his left thumb while training in Japan. He was replaced by Lorenzo Savadori in Aragon, but not in Misano.
- Joan Mir suffered health issues and abnormal blood test results. He was replaced by Takaaki Nakagami in Austria, Somkiat Chantra in Japan, and Aleix Espargaró in Indonesia.
- Fermín Aldeguer suffered a hand injury after an accident in Indonesia. He was replaced by Iker Lecuona in Australia and Malaysia.
- Toprak Razgatlıoğlu suffered a shoulder injury after a highside crash in FP2 in Indonesia. He was replaced by Augusto Fernández for the remainder of the season.
- Joan Mir, still continuing his recovery. He was replaced by Jake Dixon in Qatar and Portugal.
- Álex Márquez underwent surgery after the Malaysian GP. He was replaced by Iker Lecuona in Qatar.
- Francesco Bagnaia, still continuing his recovery from a double right-foot fracture he sustained at the Qatar Grand Prix. He was replaced by Iker Lecuona in Portugal.
- Maverick Viñales withdrew from the round in Portugal due to shoulder pain. Pol Espargaró replaced him for the remainder of the weekend.

== Rule changes ==
Engine specification will be frozen for this season. For factories in concession Rank D, the engine specification freeze will not apply unless they change rank.

== Calendar ==
The following Grands Prix are provisionally scheduled to take place in 2026:

Round	Date	Grand Prix	Circuit	Ref.
1	1 March	PT Grand Prix of Thailand	Buriram International Circuit, Buriram	
2	22 March	Estrella Galicia 0,0 Grand Prix of Brazil	Autódromo Internacional Ayrton Senna, Goiânia	
3	29 March	Red Bull Grand Prix of the United States	Circuit of the Americas, Austin	
4	26 April	Estrella Galicia 0,0 Grand Prix of Spain	Circuito de Jerez, Jerez de la Frontera	
5	10 May	Michelin Grand Prix of France	Bugatti Circuit, Le Mans	
6	17 May	(Catalonia) Monster Energy Grand Prix of Catalunya	Circuit de Barcelona-Catalunya, Montmeló	
7	31 May	Brembo Grand Prix of Italy	Mugello Circuit, Scarperia e San Piero	
8	7 June	Grand Prix of Hungary	Balaton Park Circuit, Balatonfőkajár	
9	21 June	(Czech Republic) Monster Energy Grand Prix of Czechia	Brno Circuit, Brno	
10	28 June	Tissot Grand Prix of the Netherlands	TT Circuit Assen, Assen	
11	12 July	Liqui Moly Grand Prix of Germany	Sachsenring, Hohenstein-Ernstthal	
12	9 August	(United Kingdom) Qatar Airways Grand Prix of Great Britain	Silverstone Circuit, Silverstone	
13	30 August	Michelin Grand Prix of Aragon	MotorLand Aragón, Alcañiz	
14	13 September	Red Bull Grand Prix of San Marino and the Rimini Riviera	Misano World Circuit, Misano Adriatico	
15	20 September	Qatar Airways Grand Prix of Austria	Red Bull Ring, Spielberg	
16	4 October	Motul Grand Prix of Japan	Motegi Circuit, Motegi	
17	11 October	Pertamina Grand Prix of Indonesia	Mandalika International Street Circuit, Mandalika	
18	25 October (Note: Race cancelled due to inclement weather and low visibility which affected the medical helicopter's ability to fly.)	Red Bull Grand Prix of Australia	Phillip Island Grand Prix Circuit, Phillip Island	
19	1 November	Petronas Grand Prix of Malaysia	Sepang International Circuit, Sepang	
20	8 November (Note: Race was originally scheduled on 12 April, but was rescheduled due to the ongoing Iran war.)	Qatar Airways Grand Prix of Qatar	Lusail International Circuit, Lusail	
21	22 November (Note: Race was originally scheduled on 15 November, but was rescheduled due to the new date of the Qatar GP.)	Repsol Grand Prix of Portugal	Algarve International Circuit, Portimão	
22	29 November (Note: Race was originally scheduled on 22 November, but was rescheduled due to the new date of the Qatar GP.)	(Valencian Community) Motul Grand Prix of Valencia	Circuit Ricardo Tormo, Valencia	

=== Grand Prix locations ===
Location of non-European Grands Prix in 2026.
(scheduled Grand Prix: cancelled Grand Prix)
Location of European Grands Prix in 2026.

=== Calendar changes ===
- Brazil returned to the calendar after a 21-year absence. The last race held in the country took place in 2004 at the Jacarepaguá Circuit in Rio de Janeiro, where it was known as the Rio de Janeiro Grand Prix.
- The Argentine Grand Prix did not return to the calendar this year, as the organisers have confirmed in a statement, aiming to return in 2027. The Argentine Grand Prix came back onto the calendar in 2014 at the new Autódromo Termas de Río Hondo venue, having previously been held on and off in Buenos Aires between 1961 and 1999. However on 21 July 2025, Dorna announced that the Argentine Grand Prix would have a new home starting in the 2027 season. Work is currently underway to return to the Autódromo Oscar y Juan Gálvez.
- Due to the ongoing Iran war, the Qatar Grand Prix, originally scheduled for 12 April, was postponed to 8 November. The Portuguese and Valencian Grands Prix were also rescheduled to a week later.

== Results and standings ==
=== Grands Prix ===
Round	Grand Prix	Pole position	Fastest lap	Winning rider	Winning team	Winning constructor	Report
1	Thailand motorcycle Grand Prix	(Italy) Marco Bezzecchi	(Italy) Marco Bezzecchi	(Italy) Marco Bezzecchi	(Italy) Aprilia Racing	(Italy) Aprilia	Report
2	(Brazil) Brazilian motorcycle Grand Prix	(Italy) Fabio Di Giannantonio	(Italy) Marco Bezzecchi	(Italy) Marco Bezzecchi	(Italy) Aprilia Racing	(Italy) Aprilia	Report
3	United States motorcycle Grand Prix	(Italy) Fabio Di Giannantonio	(Japan) Ai Ogura	(Italy) Marco Bezzecchi	(Italy) Aprilia Racing	(Italy) Aprilia	Report
4	(Spain) Spanish motorcycle Grand Prix	(Spain) Marc Márquez	(Spain) Álex Márquez	(Spain) Álex Márquez	(Italy) BK8 Gresini Racing MotoGP	(Italy) Ducati	Report
5	(France) French motorcycle Grand Prix	(Italy) Francesco Bagnaia	(Italy) Francesco Bagnaia	(Spain) Jorge Martín	(Italy) Aprilia Racing	(Italy) Aprilia	Report
6	(Catalonia) Catalan motorcycle Grand Prix	(Spain) Pedro Acosta	(Italy) Fabio Di Giannantonio	(Italy) Fabio Di Giannantonio	(Italy) Pertamina Enduro VR46 Racing Team	(Italy) Ducati	Report
7	(Italy) Italian motorcycle Grand Prix	(Italy) Marco Bezzecchi	(Italy) Francesco Bagnaia	(Italy) Marco Bezzecchi	(Italy) Aprilia Racing	(Italy) Aprilia	Report
8	(Hungary) Hungarian motorcycle Grand Prix	(Spain) Marc Márquez	(Spain) Marc Márquez	(Spain) Marc Márquez	(Italy) Ducati Lenovo Team	(Italy) Ducati	Report
9	(Czech Republic) Czech motorcycle Grand Prix	(Japan) Ai Ogura	(Italy) Fabio Di Giannantonio	(Spain) Marc Márquez	(Italy) Ducati Lenovo Team	(Italy) Ducati	Report
10	(Netherlands) Dutch TT	(Spain) Jorge Martín	(Japan) Ai Ogura	(Japan) Ai Ogura	(United States) SuperFile Trackhouse MotoGP Team	(Italy) Aprilia	Report
11	(Germany) German motorcycle Grand Prix	(Spain) Marc Márquez	(Spain) Marc Márquez	(Spain) Marc Márquez	(Italy) Ducati Lenovo Team	(Italy) Ducati	Report
12	(United Kingdom) British motorcycle Grand Prix	(Spain) Jorge Martín	(Spain) Raúl Fernández	(Spain) Raúl Fernández	(United States) SuperFile Trackhouse MotoGP Team	(Italy) Aprilia	Report
13	Aragon motorcycle Grand Prix	(Italy) Marco Bezzecchi	(Spain) Marc Márquez	(Spain) Marc Márquez	(Italy) Ducati Lenovo Team	(Italy) Ducati	Report
14	San Marino and Rimini Riviera motorcycle Grand Prix	(Italy) Marco Bezzecchi	(Spain) Fermín Aldeguer	(Spain) Marc Márquez	(Italy) Ducati Lenovo Team	(Italy) Ducati	Report
15	(Austria) Austrian motorcycle Grand Prix	(Spain) Jorge Martín	(Spain) Pedro Acosta	(Spain) Pedro Acosta	(Austria) Red Bull KTM Factory Racing	(Austria) KTM	Report
16	(Japan) Japanese motorcycle Grand Prix	(Spain) Jorge Martín	(Italy) Enea Bastianini	(Spain) Marc Márquez	(Italy) Ducati Lenovo Team	(Italy) Ducati	Report
17	(Indonesia) Indonesian motorcycle Grand Prix	(Spain) Raúl Fernández	(Italy) Marco Bezzecchi	(Italy) Marco Bezzecchi	(Italy) Aprilia Racing	(Italy) Aprilia	Report
18	(Australia) Australian motorcycle Grand Prix	(Spain) Marc Márquez	Race cancelled				Report
19	(Malaysia) Malaysian motorcycle Grand Prix	(Spain) Álex Márquez	(Spain) Pedro Acosta	(Spain) Marc Márquez	(Italy) Ducati Lenovo Team	(Italy) Ducati	Report
20	Qatar motorcycle Grand Prix	(Italy) Marco Bezzecchi	(Spain) Marc Márquez	(Italy) Marco Bezzecchi	(Italy) Aprilia Racing	(Italy) Aprilia	Report
21	(Portugal) Portuguese motorcycle Grand Prix	(Italy) Marco Bezzecchi	(Italy) Marco Bezzecchi	(Italy) Marco Bezzecchi	(Italy) Aprilia Racing	(Italy) Aprilia	Report
22	(Valencian Community) Valencian motorcycle Grand Prix						Report

=== Riders' standings ===
Scoring system

Points are awarded to the top fifteen finishers of the main race and to the top nine of the sprint. A rider has to finish the race to earn points.

Position	1st	2nd	3rd	4th	5th	6th	7th	8th	9th	10th	11th	12th	13th	14th	15th
Race	25	20	16	13	11	10	9	8	7	6	5	4	3	2	1
Sprint	12	9	7	6	5	4	3	2	1						

Pos.	Rider	Bike	Team	THA (Thailand)	BRA (Brazil)	USA (United States)	SPA (Spain)	FRA (France)	CAT (Catalonia)	ITA (Italy)	HUN (Hungary)	CZE (Czech Republic)	NED (Netherlands)	GER (Germany)	GBR (United Kingdom)	ARA (Aragon)	RSM (San Marino)	AUT (Austria)	JPN (Japan)	INA (Indonesia)	AUS (Australia)	MAL (Malaysia)	QAT (Qatar)	POR (Portugal)	VAL (Valencian Community)	Pts
1	(Spain) Marc Márquez	Ducati	Ducati Lenovo Team	Ret^{2}	4^{1}	5	Ret^{P 1}	DNS		7^{5}	1^{P 1 F}	1^{3}	7^{6}	1^{P 1 F}	7^{9}	1^{1 F}	1^{1}	5^{2}	1^{1}	6^{1}	C^{P 1}	1^{2}	2^{1 F}	8		439
2	(Spain) Jorge Martín	Aprilia	Aprilia Racing	4^{5}	2^{3}	2^{1}	4	1^{1}	NC	2^{2}	Ret^{6}	9^{5}	3^{P 5}	5^{6}	2^{P 1}	5^{5}	5^{3}	2^{P 1}	2^{P 3}	3^{4}	C	DNS	7^{3}	2^{5}		396
3	(Italy) Marco Bezzecchi	Aprilia	Aprilia Racing	1^{P F}	1^{4 F}	1	2	2^{3}	4^{9}	1^{P 4}	Ret^{3}	EX	Ret^{4}	DNS	3^{3}	3^{P 3}	Ret^{P 2}	3^{3}	3^{6}	1^{F}	C^{4}	6^{3}	1^{P}	1^{P 1 F}		394
4	(Spain) Pedro Acosta	KTM	Red Bull KTM Factory Racing	2^{1}	7^{9}	3^{8}	10	5^{4}	Ret^{P 2}	6^{9}	2^{2}	Ret	Ret^{9}	4^{8}	5^{6}	2^{4}	3^{6}	1^{F}	7	5^{6}	C^{5}	2^{1 F}	6^{6}	Ret^{4}		315
5	(Japan) Ai Ogura	Aprilia	SuperFile Trackhouse MotoGP Team	5^{4}	5^{5}	Ret^{6 F}	5	3^{7}	8^{8}	4^{8}	4	2^{P 2}	1^{2 F}	2^{4}	Ret^{2}			4^{4}	6^{5}	4^{2}	C	4^{4}	4^{7}	5^{6}		309
6	(Italy) Fabio Di Giannantonio	Ducati	Pertamina Enduro VR46 Racing Team	6^{8}	3^{P 2}	4^{P}	3^{5}	4	1^{3 F}	5^{3}	12	4^{4 F}	4^{3}	Ret^{3}	6^{5}	7	7^{4}	9	18	8^{3}	C^{3}	8^{5}	8^{2}	4^{7}		298
7	(Spain) Raúl Fernández	Aprilia	SuperFile Trackhouse MotoGP Team	3^{3}	10	8^{7}	6^{6}	8	17^{4}	9^{1}	Ret^{4}	7^{6}	2^{1}	3^{5}	1^{F}	Ret^{8}	6^{7}	12	5^{8}	2^{P}	C	DNS	3^{4}	3^{2}		283
8	(Spain) Álex Márquez	Ducati	BK8 Gresini Racing MotoGP	Ret	6^{7}	7^{4}	1^{F}	Ret^{8}	Ret^{1}			DNS	5	Ret^{2}	4^{4}	4^{2}	2^{5}	Ret^{5}	Ret	7^{5}	C^{2}	3^{P}		Ret^{3}		204
9	(Italy) Francesco Bagnaia	Ducati	Ducati Lenovo Team	9^{9}	Ret^{8}	10^{2}	Ret^{2}	Ret^{P 2 F}	3^{6}	3^{7 F}	3^{9}	3^{1}	Ret^{7}	6^{7}	Ret	Ret	Ret	7^{6}	8	Ret^{8}	C	13^{6}	DNS			173
10	(Italy) Enea Bastianini	KTM	Red Bull KTM Tech3	12	15	6^{3}	8	7	Ret	Ret	9^{8}	10^{7}	6^{8}	9	Ret	8	8	11	4^{4 F}	10	C	5^{9}	5^{8}	11		152
11	(Spain) Fermín Aldeguer	Ducati	BK8 Gresini Racing MotoGP		8	11	9	9	2	8^{6}	Ret^{5}	6^{8}	DNS			6^{6}	4^{8 F}	8^{8}	9	Ret^{7}			12	6		139
12	(South Africa) Brad Binder	KTM	Red Bull KTM Factory Racing	7^{6}	Ret	12	11^{4}	Ret	7	11	10	12^{9}	11	10	8	10	11	6^{9}	11	11	C^{6}	9^{7}	Ret	7		127
13	(Italy) Luca Marini	Honda	Honda HRC Castrol	10	11	9^{5}	13^{9}	10	6	13	5	8	10	8	9	14	9^{9}	14	10	12	C	7	DNS	9		124
14	(France) Fabio Quartararo	Yamaha	Monster Energy Yamaha MotoGP Team	14	16^{6}	17	14^{7}	6^{5}	5	18	Ret	Ret	8	7^{9}	16	18	10	17	12^{9}	9^{9}	C	11	DNA	12^{8}		85
15	(Brazil) Diogo Moreira	Honda	Pro Honda LCR	13	13	13	17	Ret^{9}	9	10	6^{7}	11	14	11	10	9^{7}	Ret	15	Ret^{2}	16	C^{8}	Ret^{8}	Ret	Ret		78
16	(Italy) Franco Morbidelli	Ducati	Pertamina Enduro VR46 Racing Team	8	12	14	12^{3}	14	10^{7}	14	14	13	Ret	13	11^{8}	Ret	13	18	15	14	C	10	11	15		71
17	(France) Johann Zarco	Honda	Castrol Honda LCR	11	9	Ret^{9}	7^{8}	11	Ret^{5}							15^{9}	Ret	10^{7}	20^{7}	13	C	Ret	9^{5}	Ret		63
18	(Australia) Jack Miller	Yamaha	Prima Pramac Yamaha MotoGP	18	Ret	16	18	15	15	15	8	16	12	12	12	11	Ret	21	19	Ret	C^{7}	16	DNA	13		34
19	(Spain) Joan Mir	Honda	Honda HRC Castrol	Ret^{7}	Ret	Ret	15	Ret^{6}	13	12	Ret	5	Ret	Ret	Ret^{7}	12	Ret					Ret				33
20	(Spain) Álex Rins	Yamaha	Monster Energy Yamaha MotoGP Team	15	14	18	16	12	14	Ret	13	Ret	9	14	Ret	13	Ret	19	16	15	C	12	DNA	14		31
21	(Spain) Iker Lecuona	Ducati	BK8 Gresini Racing MotoGP								7				Ret						C^{9}	15	10^{9}			25
21	(Spain) Iker Lecuona	Ducati	Ducati Lenovo Team																					10^{9}		25
22	(Turkey) Toprak Razgatlıoğlu	Yamaha	Prima Pramac Yamaha MotoGP	17	17	15	19	13	16	16	11	14	Ret	15	14	Ret	12	20	17	Ret			DNA			18
23	(Spain) Maverick Viñales	KTM	Red Bull KTM Tech3	16	18	DNS			11	17	15	15	13	Ret					14	17	C	14	13	WD		17
24	(Spain) Augusto Fernández	Yamaha	Yamaha Factory Racing				20		12				15		15											6
24	(Spain) Augusto Fernández	Yamaha	Prima Pramac Yamaha MotoGP																		C	Ret		18		6
25	(Spain) Pol Espargaró	KTM	Red Bull KTM Tech3												13	16	14	16						16		5
26	(Thailand) Somkiat Chantra	Honda	Honda HRC Castrol																13							3
27	(Japan) Takaaki Nakagami	Honda	Honda HRC Castrol															13								3
27	(Japan) Takaaki Nakagami	Honda	Honda HRC																WD							3
28	(United Kingdom) Jake Dixon	Honda	Honda HRC Castrol																				14	17		2
29	(United Kingdom) Cal Crutchlow	Honda	Castrol Honda LCR							Ret	16	17	16	Ret	Ret											0
30	(Germany) Jonas Folger	KTM	Red Bull KTM Tech3					16																		0
31	(Italy) Lorenzo Savadori	Aprilia	Aprilia Racing				Ret																			0
31	(Italy) Lorenzo Savadori	Aprilia	SuperFile Trackhouse MotoGP Team													17										0
32	(Italy) Michele Pirro	Ducati	BK8 Gresini Racing MotoGP	19						19																0
33	(Spain) Aleix Espargaró	Honda	Honda HRC Castrol																	DNS						0
Pos.	Rider	Bike	Team	THA (Thailand)	BRA (Brazil)	USA (United States)	SPA (Spain)	FRA (France)	CAT (Catalonia)	ITA (Italy)	HUN (Hungary)	CZE (Czech Republic)	NED (Netherlands)	GER (Germany)	GBR (United Kingdom)	ARA (Aragon)	RSM (San Marino)	AUT (Austria)	JPN (Japan)	INA (Indonesia)	AUS (Australia)	MAL (Malaysia)	QAT (Qatar)	POR (Portugal)	VAL (Valencian Community)	Pts

Race key
Colour	Result
Gold	Winner
Silver	2nd place
Bronze	3rd place
Green	Points finish
Blue	Non-points finish
Blue	Non-classified finish (NC)
Purple	Retired (Ret)
Red	Did not qualify (DNQ)
Black	Disqualified (DSQ)
White	Did not start (DNS)
White	Withdrew (WD)
White	Race cancelled (C)
Blank	Did not practice (DNP)
Blank	Excluded (EX)
Blank	Did not arrive (DNA)
Blank	Did not enter (empty cell)
Annotation	Meaning
P	Pole position
Superscript number	Points-scoring position in sprint race
F	Fastest lap
Rider key
Colour	Meaning
Light blue	Rookie rider

=== Constructors' standings ===
Each constructor is awarded the same number of points as their best placed rider in each race.

Pos.	Constructor	THA (Thailand)	BRA (Brazil)	USA (United States)	SPA (Spain)	FRA (France)	CAT (Catalonia)	ITA (Italy)	HUN (Hungary)	CZE (Czech Republic)	NED (Netherlands)	GER (Germany)	GBR (United Kingdom)	ARA (Aragon)	RSM (San Marino)	AUT (Austria)	JPN (Japan)	INA (Indonesia)	AUS (Australia)	MAL (Malaysia)	QAT (Qatar)	POR (Portugal)	VAL (Valencian Community)	Pts
1	(Italy) Aprilia	1^{3}	1^{3}	1^{1}	2^{6}	1^{1}	4^{4}	1^{1}	4^{3}	2^{2}	1^{1}	2^{4}	1^{1}	3^{3}	5^{2}	2^{1}	2^{3}	1^{2}	C^{4}	4^{3}	1^{3}	1^{1}		598
2	(Italy) Ducati	6^{2}	3^{1}	4^{2}	1^{1}	4^{2}	1^{1}	3^{3}	1^{1}	1^{1}	4^{3}	1^{1}	4^{4}	1^{1}	1^{1}	5^{2}	1^{1}	6^{1}	C^{1}	1^{2}	2^{1}	4^{3}		589
3	(Austria) KTM	2^{1}	7^{9}	3^{3}	8^{4}	5^{4}	7^{2}	6^{9}	2^{2}	10^{7}	6^{8}	4^{8}	5^{6}	2^{4}	3^{6}	1^{9}	4^{4}	5^{6}	C^{5}	2^{1}	5^{6}	7^{4}		378
4	(Japan) Honda	10^{7}	9	9^{5}	7^{8}	10^{6}	6^{5}	10	5^{7}	5	10	8	9^{7}	9^{7}	9^{9}	10^{7}	10^{2}	12	C^{8}	7^{8}	9^{5}	9		197
5	(Japan) Yamaha	14	14^{6}	15	14^{7}	6^{5}	5	15	8	14	8	7^{9}	12	11	10	17	12^{9}	9^{9}	C^{7}	11	DNA	12^{8}		111
Pos.	Constructor	THA (Thailand)	BRA (Brazil)	USA (United States)	SPA (Spain)	FRA (France)	CAT (Catalonia)	ITA (Italy)	HUN (Hungary)	CZE (Czech Republic)	NED (Netherlands)	GER (Germany)	GBR (United Kingdom)	ARA (Aragon)	RSM (San Marino)	AUT (Austria)	JPN (Japan)	INA (Indonesia)	AUS (Australia)	MAL (Malaysia)	QAT (Qatar)	POR (Portugal)	VAL (Valencian Community)	Pts

=== Teams' standings ===
The teams' standings are based on results obtained by regular and substitute riders; wild-card entries are ineligible.

Pos.	Team	Bike No.	THA (Thailand)	BRA (Brazil)	USA (United States)	SPA (Spain)	FRA (France)	CAT (Catalonia)	ITA (Italy)	HUN (Hungary)	CZE (Czech Republic)	NED (Netherlands)	GER (Germany)	GBR (United Kingdom)	ARA (Aragon)	RSM (San Marino)	AUT (Austria)	JPN (Japan)	INA (Indonesia)	AUS (Australia)	MAL (Malaysia)	QAT (Qatar)	POR (Portugal)	VAL (Valencian Community)	Pts
1	(Italy) Aprilia Racing	72	1^{P F}	1^{4 F}	1	2	2^{3}	4^{9}	1^{P 4}	Ret^{3}	EX	Ret^{4}	DNS	3^{3}	3^{P 3}	Ret^{P 2}	3^{3}	3^{6}	1^{F}	C^{4}	6^{3}	1^{P}	1^{P 1 F}		790
1	(Italy) Aprilia Racing	89	4^{5}	2^{3}	2^{1}	4	1^{1}	NC	2^{2}	Ret^{6}	9^{5}	3^{P 5}	5^{6}	2^{P 1}	5^{5}	5^{3}	2^{P 1}	2^{P 3}	3^{4}	C	DNS	7^{3}	2^{5}		790
2	(Italy) Ducati Lenovo Team	27																					10^{9}		619
2	(Italy) Ducati Lenovo Team	63	9^{9}	Ret^{8}	10^{2}	Ret^{2}	Ret^{P 2 F}	3^{6}	3^{7 F}	3^{9}	3^{1}	Ret^{7}	6^{7}	Ret	Ret	Ret	7^{6}	8	Ret^{8}	C	13^{6}	DNS			619
2	(Italy) Ducati Lenovo Team	93	Ret^{2}	4^{1}	5	Ret^{P 1}	DNS		7^{5}	1^{P 1 F}	1^{3}	7^{6}	1^{P 1 F}	7^{9}	1^{1 F}	1^{1}	5^{2}	1^{1}	6^{1}	C^{P 1}	1^{2}	2^{1 F}	8		619
3	(United States) SuperFile Trackhouse MotoGP Team	25	3^{3}	10	8^{7}	6^{6}	8	17^{4}	9^{1}	Ret^{4}	7^{6}	2^{1}	3^{5}	1^{F}	Ret^{8}	6^{7}	12	5^{8}	2^{P}	C	DNS	3^{4}	3^{2}		592
3	(United States) SuperFile Trackhouse MotoGP Team	32													17										592
3	(United States) SuperFile Trackhouse MotoGP Team	79	5^{4}	5^{5}	Ret^{6 F}	5	3^{7}	8^{8}	4^{8}	4	2^{P 2}	1^{2 F}	2^{4}	Ret^{2}			4^{4}	6^{5}	4^{2}	C	4^{4}	4^{7}	5^{6}		592
4	(Austria) Red Bull KTM Factory Racing	33	7^{6}	Ret	12	11^{4}	Ret	7	11	10	12^{9}	11	10	8	10	11	6^{9}	11	11	C^{6}	9^{7}	Ret	7		442
4	(Austria) Red Bull KTM Factory Racing	37	2^{1}	7^{9}	3^{8}	10	5^{4}	Ret^{P 2}	6^{9}	2^{2}	Ret	Ret^{9}	4^{8}	5^{6}	2^{4}	3^{6}	1^{F}	7	5^{6}	C^{5}	2^{1 F}	6^{6}	Ret^{4}		442
5	(Italy) Pertamina Enduro VR46 Racing Team	21	8	12	14	12^{3}	14	10^{7}	14	14	13	Ret	13	11^{8}	Ret	13	18	15	14	C	10	11	15		369
5	(Italy) Pertamina Enduro VR46 Racing Team	49	6^{8}	3^{P 2}	4^{P}	3^{5}	4	1^{3 F}	5^{3}	12	4^{4 F}	4^{3}	Ret^{3}	6^{5}	7	7^{4}	9	18	8^{3}	C^{3}	8^{5}	8^{2}	4^{7}		369
6	(Italy) BK8 Gresini Racing MotoGP	27								7				Ret						C^{9}	15	10^{9}			361
6	(Italy) BK8 Gresini Racing MotoGP	51	19						19																361
6	(Italy) BK8 Gresini Racing MotoGP	54		8	11	9	9	2	8^{6}	Ret^{5}	6^{8}	DNS			6^{6}	4^{8 F}	8^{8}	9	Ret^{7}			12	6		361
6	(Italy) BK8 Gresini Racing MotoGP	73	Ret	6^{7}	7^{4}	1^{F}	Ret^{8}	Ret^{1}			DNS	5	Ret^{2}	4^{4}	4^{2}	2^{5}	Ret^{5}	Ret	7^{5}	C^{2}	3^{P}		Ret^{3}		361
7	(France) Red Bull KTM Tech3	12	16	18	DNS			11	17	15	15	13	Ret					14	17	C	14	13	WD		174
7	(France) Red Bull KTM Tech3	23	12	15	6^{3}	8	7	Ret	Ret	9^{8}	10^{7}	6^{8}	9	Ret	8	8	11	4^{4 F}	10	C	5^{9}	5^{8}	11		174
7	(France) Red Bull KTM Tech3	44												13	16	14	16						16		174
7	(France) Red Bull KTM Tech3	94					16																		174
8	(Japan) Honda HRC Castrol	10	10	11	9^{5}	13^{9}	10	6	13	5	8	10	8	9	14	9^{9}	14	10	12	C	7	DNS	9		165
8	(Japan) Honda HRC Castrol	15																13							165
8	(Japan) Honda HRC Castrol	30															13								165
8	(Japan) Honda HRC Castrol	36	Ret^{7}	Ret	Ret	15	Ret^{6}	13	12	Ret	5	Ret	Ret	Ret^{7}	12	Ret					Ret				165
8	(Japan) Honda HRC Castrol	41																	DNS						165
8	(Japan) Honda HRC Castrol	96																				14	17		165
9	(Monaco) LCR Honda	5	11	9	Ret^{9}	7^{8}	11	Ret^{5}							15^{9}	Ret	10^{7}	20^{7}	13	C	Ret	9^{5}	Ret		141
9	(Monaco) LCR Honda	11	13	13	13	17	Ret^{9}	9	10	6^{7}	11	14	11	10	9^{7}	Ret	15	Ret^{2}	16	C^{8}	Ret^{8}	Ret	Ret		141
9	(Monaco) LCR Honda	35							Ret	16	17	16	Ret	Ret											141
10	(Japan) Monster Energy Yamaha MotoGP Team	20	14	16^{6}	17	14^{7}	6^{5}	5	18	Ret	Ret	8	7^{9}	16	18	10	17	12^{9}	9^{9}	C	11	DNA	12^{8}		116
10	(Japan) Monster Energy Yamaha MotoGP Team	42	15	14	18	16	12	14	Ret	13	Ret	9	14	Ret	13	Ret	19	16	15	C	12	DNA	14		116
11	(Italy) Prima Pramac Yamaha MotoGP	7	17	17	15	19	13	16	16	11	14	Ret	15	14	Ret	12	20	17	Ret			DNA			52
11	(Italy) Prima Pramac Yamaha MotoGP	43	18	Ret	16	18	15	15	15	8	16	12	12	12	11	Ret	21	19	Ret	C^{7}	16	DNA	13		52
11	(Italy) Prima Pramac Yamaha MotoGP	47																		C	Ret		18		52
Pos.	Team	Bike No.	THA (Thailand)	BRA (Brazil)	USA (United States)	SPA (Spain)	FRA (France)	CAT (Catalonia)	ITA (Italy)	HUN (Hungary)	CZE (Czech Republic)	NED (Netherlands)	GER (Germany)	GBR (United Kingdom)	ARA (Aragon)	RSM (San Marino)	AUT (Austria)	JPN (Japan)	INA (Indonesia)	AUS (Australia)	MAL (Malaysia)	QAT (Qatar)	POR (Portugal)	VAL (Valencian Community)	Pts
