= Diogo Moreira =

Brazilian motorcycle racer (born 2004)

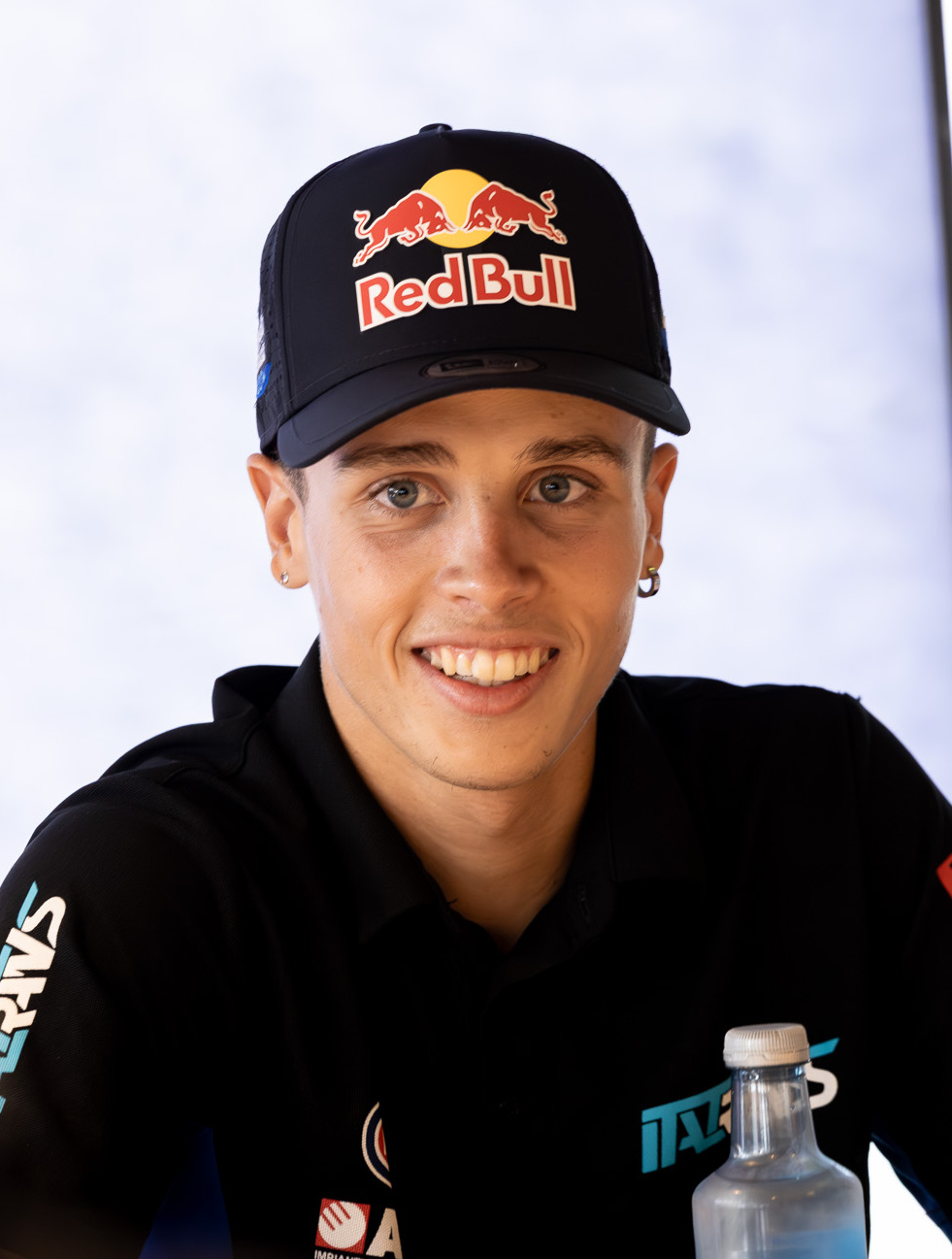
- Moreira at the 2025 Italian Grand Prix
- Born: 23 April 2004 (age 22); Guarulhos, São Paulo, Brazil
- Current team: Pro Honda LCR
- Bike number: 11
Motorcycle racing career statistics
MotoGP World Championship
Active years	2026–
Manufacturers	Honda
Starts / Wins / Podiums / Poles / F. laps / Points; 2 / 0 / 0 / 0 / 0 / 6
Moto2 World Championship
Active years	2024–2025
Manufacturers	Kalex
Championships	1 (2025)
2025 championship position	1st (287 pts)
Starts / Wins / Podiums / Poles / F. laps / Points; 40 / 4 / 10 / 7 / 3 / 367
Moto3 World Championship
Active years	2022–2023
Manufacturers	KTM
2023 championship position	8th (131 pts)
Starts / Wins / Podiums / Poles / F. laps / Points; 39 / 1 / 3 / 2 / 0 / 243

Diogo Moreira Nascimento (born 23 April 2004) is a Brazilian motorcycle racer who competes in the 2026 MotoGP World Championship for LCR Honda. He is the 2025 Moto2 World Champion, and the first Brazilian to win a championship in any class of Grand Prix racing.

Moreira is set to join the Honda factory team for the 2027 season.

== Career ==
After starting his motorcycle career in motocross in Brazil, Moreira moved to Spain in 2017 in order to continue his career. In 2019, he made his debut in the Talent Cup of the CEV International Championship, obtaining one victory and three podiums, finishing in sixth place. In 2020, he moved to the Moto3 class of the CEV, recording a fifth place as his best finish and finishing eleventh in the standings. In 2021, he remained in the same category, finishing eleventh again.

=== Moto3 ===
In 2022, Moreira joined the world championship in the Moto3 class with the MT Helmets - MSI team, riding a KTM RC250GP. He took his first pole position in Silverstone and finished the season in eighth place in the standings. He was named Rookie of the Year.

Moreira began the 2023 season with two more podium finishes in Portugal and Argentina. His results trailed off during the midseason. He claimed his first pole position of the year in Indonesia, followed by his first Grand Prix race win. He then recorded three non-finishes in the last five races of the season, and finished again in eighth place.

=== Moto2 ===
In 2024, Moreira made his Moto2 debut for the Italtrans Racing Team, alongside Dennis Foggia. After a string of early crashes and finishes outside the points positions, his season began to improve after the summer break. He took his first podium in Moto2 at the final race of the season, the Solidarity GP, and finished ranked thirteenth in the standings. He was named Rookie of the Year.

In 2025, Moreira made history at the Dutch TT as the first Brazilian winner of a Moto2 race. Moreira began to shrink his massive points deficit to rival Manuel González, winning further races in Austria, Indonesia and Portugal. He arrived at the final race of the season in Valencia as championship leader, with a 24-point advantage over González. After finishing the race in tenth, Moreira became Moto2 champion. He was the first Brazilian champion in any class of motorcycle Grand Prix racing.

=== MotoGP ===
On 14 October 2025, it was announced that Moreira would join the LCR Honda team for the 2026 MotoGP season, replacing Somkiat Chantra. He is the first Brazilian to compete in the premier class since Alex Barros retired in 2007.

==== Pro Honda LCR (2026) ====
Moreira scored his first sprint podium at the Japanese Grand Prix, finishing second.

==== Honda HRC Castrol (2027–) ====
Moreira is set to be promoted to the Honda factory team for 2027, partnering Fabio Quartararo.

== Career statistics ==
=== CEV Moto4 Championship ===
==== By season ====
Season	Class	Motorcycle	Race	Win	Podium	Pole	Pts	Plcd
2018	Moto4	BeOn	N/A	0	2	N/A	101	2nd

=== FIM European Talent Cup Championship ===
==== Races by year ====
(key) (Races in bold indicate pole position, races in italics indicate fastest lap)

Year	Bike	1	2	3	4	5	6	7	8	9	10	11	Pos	Pts
2019	Honda	EST; 14	EST; 6	VAL; 6	VAL; 8	CAT; 19	ARA; 18	ARA; 15	**JER**; 2	**JER**; 1	ALB; 2	VAL; Ret	6th	96

=== FIM CEV Moto3 Junior World Championship ===
==== Races by year ====
(key) (Races in bold indicate pole position, races in italics indicate fastest lap)

Year	Bike	1	2	3	4	5	6	7	8	9	10	11	12	Pos	Pts
2020	Honda	EST; 14	POR; 11	JER1; 5	JER2; 7	JER3; 6	ARA1; 28	ARA2; 9	ARA3; Ret	VAL1; Ret	VAL2; 18	VAL3; 11		10th	49
2021	Honda	EST; 9	VAL1; 3	VAL2; Ret	CAT1; Ret	CAT2; DNS	POR; Ret	ARA; 7	JER1; 6	JER2; 9	RSM; 11	VAL3; Ret	VAL4; 8	11th	62

=== Red Bull MotoGP Rookies Cup ===
==== Races by year ====
(key) (Races in bold indicate pole position, races in italics indicate fastest lap)

Year	1	2	3	4	5	6	7	8	9	10	11	12	13	14	Pos	Pts
2021	**POR1**; 2	**POR2**; 8	SPA1; 3	SPA2; 2	MUG1; 3	MUG2; 15	GER1; 6	GER2; 4	RBR1	RBR2	RBR3	RBR4	ARA1; 4	ARA2; 6	6th	127

=== Grand Prix motorcycle racing ===
==== By season ====
Season	Class	Motorcycle	Team	Race	Win	Podium	Pole	FLap	Pts	Plcd
2022	Moto3	KTM	MT Helmets – MSI	19	0	0	1	0	112	8th
2023	Moto3	KTM	MT Helmets – MSI	20	1	3	1	0	131	8th
2024	Moto2	Kalex	Italtrans Racing Team	18	0	1	0	0	80	13th
2025	Moto2	Kalex	Italtrans Racing Team	22	4	9	7	3	287	**1st**
2026	MotoGP	Honda	Honda LCR	17	0	0	0	0	74*	15th*
Total				**86**	**5**	**13**	**9**	**3**	**632**	

==== By class ====
Class	Seasons	1st GP	1st pod	1st win	Race	Win	Podiums	Pole	FLap	Pts	WChmp
Moto3	2022–2023	2022 Qatar	2023 Portugal	2023 Indonesia	39	1	3	2	0	243	0
Moto2	2024–2025	2024 Qatar	2024 Solidarity	2025 Dutch	40	4	10	7	3	366	1
MotoGP	2026–	2026 Thailand			7	0	0	0	0	23	0
Total	2022–present				**86**	**5**	**13**	**9**	**3**	**632**	**1**

==== Races by year ====
(key) (Races in bold indicate pole position; races in italics indicate fastest lap; ^{superscript} indicates point-scoring sprint position)

Year	Class	Bike	1	2	3	4	5	6	7	8	9	10	11	12	13	14	15	16	17	18	19	20	21	22	Pos	Pts
2022	Moto3	KTM	QAT; 6	INA; Ret	ARG; 6	AME; Ret	POR; 10	SPA; 10	FRA; 14	ITA; Ret	CAT; DNS	GER; 16	NED; 16	**GBR**; 6	AUT; 6	RSM; 7	ARA; 15	JPN; 6	THA; 6	AUS; 7	MAL; 5	VAL; 8			8th	112
2023	Moto3	KTM	POR; 3	ARG; 2	AME; 4	SPA; 10	FRA; Ret	ITA; 7	GER; 7	NED; 12	GBR; 7	AUT; 8	CAT; 16	RSM; 12	IND; 13	JPN; 14	**INA**; 1	AUS; Ret	THA; 13	MAL; Ret	QAT; 26	VAL; Ret			8th	131
2024	Moto2	Kalex	QAT; 22	POR; 18	AME; 14	SPA; Ret	FRA; 26	CAT; Ret	ITA; 11	NED; 16	GER; 4	GBR; Ret	AUT; 16	ARA; 17	RSM; 8	EMI; DNS	INA	JPN; 8	AUS; 5	THA; 5	MAL; 10	SLD; 3			13th	80
2025	Moto2	Kalex	THA; 4	ARG; Ret	AME; 21	QAT; 5	SPA; 4	FRA; 4	GBR; 2	**ARA**; 2	**ITA**; 4	**NED**; 1	GER; Ret	CZE; Ret	AUT; 1	**HUN**; 2	CAT; 14	RSM; 4	JPN; 3	**INA**; 1	**AUS**; 3	MAL; 5	**POR**; 1	VAL; 10	1st	287
2026	MotoGP	Honda	THA; 13	BRA; 13	USA; 13	SPA; 17	FRA; Ret^{9}	CAT; 9	ITA; 10	HUN; 6^{7}	CZE; 11	NED; 14	GER; 11	GBR; 10	ARA; 9^{7}	RSM; Ret	AUT; 15	JPN; Ret^{2}	INA; 16	AUS; C^{8}	MAL	QAT	POR	VAL	14th*	76*
