= 2026 Japanese motorcycle Grand Prix =

Motorcycle races in Motegi

(Japan) 2026 Japanese Grand Prix
Race details
- Race 16 of 22 races in the 2026 Grand Prix motorcycle racing season
- Date: 4 October 2026
- Official name: Motul Grand Prix of Japan
- Location: Mobility Resort Motegi; Motegi, Japan
- Course: Permanent racing facility; 4.801 km (2.983 mi)

MotoGP
Pole position
Rider	(Spain) Jorge Martín	Aprilia
Time	1:42.371	
Fastest lap
Rider	(Italy) Enea Bastianini	KTM
Time	1:43.041 on lap 23	
Podium
First	(Spain) Marc Márquez	Ducati
Second	(Spain) Jorge Martín	Aprilia
Third	(Italy) Marco Bezzecchi	Aprilia

Moto2
Pole position
Rider	(Spain) Izan Guevara	Boscoscuro
Time	1:46.851	
Fastest lap
Rider	(Italy) Celestino Vietti	Boscoscuro
Time	1:47.479 on lap 13	
Podium
First	(Spain) Izan Guevara	Boscoscuro
Second	(Italy) Tony Arbolino	Kalex
Third	(Czech Republic) Filip Salač	Kalex

Moto3
Pole position
Rider	(Spain) David Almansa	KTM
Time	1:54.572	
Fastest lap
Rider	(Spain) Brian Uriarte	KTM
Time	1:54.710 on lap 16	
Podium
First	(Spain) David Almansa	KTM
Second	(Spain) Máximo Quiles	KTM
Third	(Spain) Álvaro Carpe	KTM

The 2026 Japanese motorcycle Grand Prix (officially known as the Motul Grand Prix of Japan) was the sixteenth round of the 2026 Grand Prix motorcycle racing season. All races were held at the Mobility Resort Motegi in Motegi on 4 October 2026.

== MotoGP Sprint ==
The MotoGP Sprint was held on 3 October 2026.

Pos.	No.	Rider	Team	Manufacturer	Laps	Time/Retired	Grid	Points
1	93	(Spain) Marc Márquez	Ducati Lenovo Team	Ducati	12	20:50.376	5	12
2	11	(Brazil) Diogo Moreira	Pro Honda LCR	Honda	12	+2.754	9	9
3	89	(Spain) Jorge Martín	Aprilia Racing	Aprilia	12	+2.466 (Note: Demoted one position due to exceeding track limits on the final lap.)	1	7
4	23	(Italy) Enea Bastianini	Red Bull KTM Tech3	KTM	12	+2.508	7	6
5	79	(Japan) Ai Ogura	SuperFile Trackhouse MotoGP Team	Aprilia	12	+5.992	11	5
6	72	(Italy) Marco Bezzecchi	Aprilia Racing	Aprilia	12	+6.984	4	4
7	5	(France) Johann Zarco	Castrol Honda LCR	Honda	12	+8.088	10	3
8	25	(Spain) Raúl Fernández	SuperFile Trackhouse MotoGP Team	Aprilia	12	+8.817	8	2
9	20	(France) Fabio Quartararo	Monster Energy Yamaha MotoGP Team	Yamaha	12	+10.586	12	1
10	54	(Spain) Fermín Aldeguer	BK8 Gresini Racing MotoGP	Ducati	12	+11.129	18	
11	10	(Italy) Luca Marini	Honda HRC Castrol	Honda	12	+13.632	16	
12	21	(Italy) Franco Morbidelli	Pertamina Enduro VR46 Racing Team	Ducati	12	+15.209	14	
13	42	(Spain) Álex Rins	Monster Energy Yamaha MotoGP Team	Yamaha	12	+19.873	21	
14	15	(Thailand) Somkiat Chantra	Honda HRC Castrol	Honda	12	+19.983	15	
15	12	(Spain) Maverick Viñales	Red Bull KTM Tech3	KTM	12	+20.469	19	
16	43	(Australia) Jack Miller	Prima Pramac Yamaha MotoGP	Yamaha	12	+21.894	20	
17	7	(Turkey) Toprak Razgatlıoğlu	Prima Pramac Yamaha MotoGP	Yamaha	12	+38.442	22	
18	33	(South Africa) Brad Binder	Red Bull KTM Factory Racing	KTM	12	+41.284	17	
Ret	63	(Italy) Francesco Bagnaia	Ducati Lenovo Team	Ducati	11	Technical	13	
Ret	49	(Italy) Fabio Di Giannantonio	Pertamina Enduro VR46 Racing Team	Ducati	0	Collision	6	
Ret	37	(Spain) Pedro Acosta	Red Bull KTM Factory Racing	KTM	0	Collision	3	
Ret	73	(Spain) Álex Márquez	BK8 Gresini Racing MotoGP	Ducati	0	Collision	5	
WD	30	(Japan) Takaaki Nakagami	Honda HRC	Honda		Injury		
Fastest sprint lap: (Spain) Marc Márquez (Ducati) - 1:43.471 (lap 9)
Official MotoGP Sprint Report

== Race ==
=== MotoGP ===
Pos.	No.	Rider	Team	Manufacturer	Laps	Time/Retired	Grid	Points
1	93	(Spain) Marc Márquez	Ducati Lenovo Team	Ducati	24	41:31.467	2	25
2	89	(Spain) Jorge Martín	Aprilia Racing	Aprilia	24	+1.363	1	20
3	72	(Italy) Marco Bezzecchi	Aprilia Racing	Aprilia	24	+2.252	4	16
4	23	(Italy) Enea Bastianini	Red Bull KTM Tech3	KTM	24	+2.330	7	13
5	25	(Spain) Raúl Fernández	SuperFile Trackhouse MotoGP Team	Aprilia	24	+14.815	8	11
6	79	(Japan) Ai Ogura	SuperFile Trackhouse MotoGP Team	Aprilia	24	+15.210	11	10
7	37	(Spain) Pedro Acosta	Red Bull KTM Factory Racing	KTM	24	+16.928	3	9
8	63	(Italy) Francesco Bagnaia	Ducati Lenovo Team	Ducati	24	+20.333	13	8
9	54	(Spain) Fermín Aldeguer	BK8 Gresini Racing MotoGP	Ducati	24	+23.545	18	7
10	10	(Italy) Luca Marini	Honda HRC Castrol	Honda	24	+25.677	16	6
11	33	(South Africa) Brad Binder	Red Bull KTM Factory Racing	KTM	24	+25.853	17	5
12	20	(France) Fabio Quartararo	Monster Energy Yamaha MotoGP Team	Yamaha	24	+30.867	12	4
13	15	(Thailand) Somkiat Chantra	Honda HRC Castrol	Honda	24	+31.333	15	3
14	12	(Spain) Maverick Viñales	Red Bull KTM Tech3	KTM	24	+33.995	19	2
15	21	(Italy) Franco Morbidelli	Pertamina Enduro VR46 Racing Team	Ducati	24	+34.590	14	1
16	42	(Spain) Álex Rins	Monster Energy Yamaha MotoGP Team	Yamaha	24	+39.228	21	
17	7	(Turkey) Toprak Razgatlıoğlu	Prima Pramac Yamaha MotoGP	Yamaha	24	+39.562	22	
18	49	(Italy) Fabio Di Giannantonio	Pertamina Enduro VR46 Racing Team	Ducati	24	+50.816	6	
19	43	(Australia) Jack Miller	Prima Pramac Yamaha MotoGP	Yamaha	24	+1:11.127	20	
20	5	(France) Johann Zarco	Castrol Honda LCR	Honda	24	+2 laps	10	
Ret	73	(Spain) Álex Márquez	BK8 Gresini Racing MotoGP	Ducati	18	Accident	5	
Ret	11	(Brazil) Diogo Moreira	Pro Honda LCR	Honda	8	Accident	9	
WD	30	(Japan) Takaaki Nakagami	Honda HRC	Honda		Injury		
Fastest lap: (Italy) Enea Bastianini (KTM) – 1:43.041 (lap 23)
Official MotoGP Race Report

=== Moto2 ===
Pos.	No.	Rider	Team	Manufacturer	Laps	Time/Retired	Grid	Points
1	28	(Spain) Izan Guevara	Blu Cru Pramac Yamaha Moto2	Boscoscuro	19	34:14.675	1	25
2	14	(Italy) Tony Arbolino	Reds Fantic Racing	Kalex	19	+0.419	5	20
3	12	(Czech Republic) Filip Salač	OnlyFans American Racing Team	Kalex	19	+1.057	2	16
4	4	(Spain) Iván Ortolá	QJMotor - JP Financial - MSi	Kalex	19	+1.247	7	13
5	80	(Colombia) David Alonso	CFMoto Power Electronics Aspar Team	Kalex	19	+1.554	6	11
6	13	(Italy) Celestino Vietti	Beta Tools SpeedRS Team	Boscoscuro	19	+2.016	9	10
7	53	(Turkey) Deniz Öncü	Elf Marc VDS Racing Team	Boscoscuro	19	+7.037	11	9
8	96	(Spain) Daniel Holgado	CFMoto Power Electronics Aspar Team	Kalex	19	+7.069	4	8
9	21	(Spain) Alonso López	Italjet Gresini Moto2	Kalex	19	+9.547	14	7
10	98	(Spain) José Antonio Rueda	Red Bull KTM Ajo	Kalex	19	+11.517	15	6
11	99	(Spain) Adrián Huertas	Italtrans Racing Team	Kalex	19	+13.341	8	5
12	17	(Spain) Daniel Muñoz	Italtrans Racing Team	Kalex	19	+13.432	18	4
13	81	(Australia) Senna Agius	Liqui Moly Dynavolt Intact GP	Kalex	19	+13.509	10	3
14	71	(Japan) Ayumu Sasaki	Momoven Idrofoglia RW Racing Team	Kalex	19	+16.422	13	2
15	84	(Netherlands) Zonta van den Goorbergh	Momoven Idrofoglia RW Racing Team	Kalex	19	+16.505	12	1
16	7	(Belgium) Barry Baltus	Reds Fantic Racing	Kalex	19	+16.646	24	
17	44	(Spain) Arón Canet	Elf Marc VDS Racing Team	Boscoscuro	19	+22.026	22	
18	11	(Spain) Álex Escrig	Klint Racing Team	Forward	19	+24.358	16	
19	85	(Spain) Xabi Zurutuza	Klint Racing Team	Forward	19	+25.062	26	
20	16	(United States) Joe Roberts	OnlyFans American Racing Team	Kalex	19	+25.717	19	
21	32	(Italy) Luca Lunetta	Beta Tools SpeedRS Team	Boscoscuro	19	+26.784	25	
22	18	(Spain) Manuel González	Liqui Moly Dynavolt Intact GP	Kalex	19	+31.269	3	
23	10	(Spain) Unai Orradre	QJMotor - JP Financial - MSi	Kalex	19	+33.299	17	
24	40	(Poland) Milan Pawelec	Red Bull KTM Ajo	Kalex	19	+38.626	27	
Ret	64	(Indonesia) Mario Aji	Idemitsu Honda Team Asia	Kalex	11	Accident damage	21	
Ret	72	(Japan) Taiyo Furusato	Idemitsu Honda Team Asia	Kalex	8	Accident damage	20	
Ret	3	(Spain) Sergio García	Italjet Gresini Moto2	Kalex	7	Accident	23	
Fastest lap: (Italy) Celestino Vietti (Boscoscuro) – 1:47.479 (lap 13)
Official Moto2 Race Report

=== Moto3 ===
Pos.	No.	Rider	Team	Manufacturer	Laps	Time/Retired	Grid	Points
1	22	(Spain) David Almansa	Liqui Moly Dynavolt Intact GP	KTM	17	32:45.544	1	25
2	28	(Spain) Máximo Quiles	CFMoto Gaviota Aspar Team	KTM	17	+0.046	4	20
3	83	(Spain) Álvaro Carpe	Red Bull KTM Ajo	KTM	17	+2.738	3	16
4	51	(Spain) Brian Uriarte	Red Bull KTM Ajo	KTM	17	+3.610	2	13
5	27	(Finland) Rico Salmela	Red Bull KTM Ajo	KTM	17	+4.430	7	11
6	18	(Italy) Matteo Bertelle	Level Up - MTA	KTM	17	+5.584	5	10
7	64	(Spain) David Muñoz	Liqui Moly Dynavolt Intact GP	KTM	17	+13.080	6	9
8	6	(Japan) Ryusei Yamanaka	AEON Credit - MT Helmets - MSi	KTM	17	+13.166	10	8
9	78	(Spain) Joel Esteban	Level Up - MTA	KTM	17	+20.962	17	7
10	11	(Spain) Adrián Cruces	CIP Green Power	KTM	17	+21.031	12	6
11	9	(Indonesia) Veda Pratama	Honda Team Asia	Honda	17	+21.120	16	5
12	13	(Malaysia) Hakim Danish	AEON Credit - MT Helmets - MSi	KTM	17	+21.273	21	4
13	31	(Spain) Adrián Fernández	Leopard Racing	Honda	17	+21.725	11	3
14	73	(Argentina) Valentín Perrone	Red Bull KTM Tech3	KTM	17	+21.776	8	2
15	67	(Republic of Ireland) Casey O'Gorman	Sic58 Squadra Corse	Honda	17	+21.976	22	1
16	79	(Japan) Ryota Ogiwara	Code Motorsports	KTM	17	+22.472	18	
17	66	(Australia) Joel Kelso	Gryd Racing	Honda	17	+22.591	23	
18	97	(Argentina) Marco Morelli	CFMoto Gaviota Aspar Team	KTM	17	+27.938	9	
19	54	(Spain) Jesús Ríos	Rivacold Snipers Team	Honda	17	+28.113	13	
20	19	(United Kingdom) Scott Ogden	CIP Green Power	KTM	17	+28.339	20	
21	32	(Japan) Zen Mitani	Honda Team Asia	Honda	17	+30.844	15	
22	21	(South Africa) Ruché Moodley	Code Motorsports	KTM	17	+38.461	26	
Ret	5	(Austria) Leo Rammerstorfer	Sic58 Squadra Corse	Honda	16	Technical	25	
Ret	8	(United Kingdom) Eddie O'Shea	Gryd Racing	Honda	15	Accident	19	
Ret	94	(Italy) Guido Pini	Leopard Racing	Honda	11	Accident	14	
Ret	85	(Thailand) Kiattisak Singhapong	Rivacold Snipers Team	Honda	1	Accident damage	24	
Fastest lap: (Spain) Brian Uriarte (KTM) – 1:54.710 (lap 16)
Official Moto3 Race Report

== Championship standings after the race ==
Below are the standings for the top five riders, constructors, and teams after the round.

=== MotoGP ===
Riders' Championship standings

	Pos.	Rider	Points
	1	(Spain) Jorge Martín	333
	2	(Spain) Marc Márquez	331
	3	(Italy) Marco Bezzecchi	284
	4	(Spain) Pedro Acosta	243
1	5	(Japan) Ai Ogura	237

Constructors' Championship standings

	Pos.	Constructor	Points
1	1	(Italy) Ducati	469
1	2	(Italy) Aprilia	469
	3	(Austria) KTM	296
	4	(Japan) Honda	161
	5	(Japan) Yamaha	89

Teams' Championship standings

	Pos.	Team	Points
	1	(Italy) Aprilia Racing	617
	2	(Italy) Ducati Lenovo Team	495
	3	(United States) SuperFile Trackhouse MotoGP Team	453
	4	(Austria) Red Bull KTM Factory Racing	342
1	5	(Italy) BK8 Gresini Racing MotoGP	289

=== Moto2 ===
Riders' Championship standings

	Pos.	Rider	Points
	1	(Spain) Manuel González	245.5
	2	(Spain) Izan Guevara	235
	3	(Spain) Iván Ortolá	181.5
	4	(Colombia) David Alonso	166
1	5	(Spain) Daniel Holgado	154

Constructors' Championship standings

Pos.	Constructor	Points
1	(Germany) Kalex	372.5
2	(Italy) Boscoscuro	256
3	(Switzerland) Forward	63

Teams' Championship standings

	Pos.	Team	Points
	1	(Germany) Liqui Moly Dynavolt Intact GP	397.5
	2	(Spain) CFMoto Power Electronics Aspar Team	320
	3	(Italy) Blu Cru Pramac Yamaha Moto2	252.5
1	4	(United States) OnlyFans American Racing Team	188
1	5	(Spain) QJMotor – JP Financial – MSi	185.5

=== Moto3 ===
Riders' Championship standings

	Pos.	Rider	Points
	1	(Spain) Máximo Quiles	326
1	2	(Spain) David Almansa	199
1	3	(Spain) Álvaro Carpe	191
	4	(Spain) Brian Uriarte	187
	5	(Argentina) Marco Morelli	146

Constructors' Championship standings

Pos.	Constructor	Points
1	(Austria) KTM	395
2	(Japan) Honda	190

Teams' Championship standings

Pos.	Team	Points
1	(Spain) CFMoto Gaviota Aspar Team	472
2	(Finland) Red Bull KTM Ajo	378
3	(Germany) Liqui Moly Dynavolt Intact GP	273
4	(France) Red Bull KTM Tech3	201
5	(Italy) LevelUp – MTA	162

== Notes ==
Previous race: 2026 Austrian Grand Prix	FIM Grand Prix World Championship; 2026 season	Next race: 2026 Indonesian Grand Prix
Previous race: 2025 Japanese Grand Prix	Japanese motorcycle Grand Prix	Next race: 2027 Japanese Grand Prix
