= 2026 Malaysian motorcycle Grand Prix =

Motorcycle races in Sepang

(Malaysia) 2026 Malaysian Grand Prix
Race details
- Race 19 of 22 races in the 2026 Grand Prix motorcycle racing season
- Date: 1 November 2026
- Official name: Petronas Grand Prix of Malaysia
- Location: Sepang International Circuit; Sepang, Selangor, Malaysia
- Course: Permanent racing facility; 5.543 km (3.444 mi)

MotoGP
Pole position
Rider	(Spain) Álex Márquez	Ducati
Time	1:56.493	
Fastest lap
Rider	(Spain) Pedro Acosta	KTM
Time	1:59.261 on lap 2	
Podium
First	(Spain) Marc Márquez	Ducati
Second	(Spain) Pedro Acosta	KTM
Third	(Spain) Álex Márquez	Ducati

Moto2
Pole position
Rider	(Spain) Daniel Holgado	Kalex
Time	2:02.875	
Fastest lap
Rider	(Colombia) David Alonso	Kalex
Time	2:04.422 on lap 2	
Podium
First	(Colombia) David Alonso	Kalex
Second	(Spain) Daniel Holgado	Kalex
Third	(Spain) Ángel Piqueras	Kalex

Moto3
Pole position
Rider	(Spain) Máximo Quiles	KTM
Time	2:10.396	
Fastest lap
Rider	(Spain) Álvaro Carpe	KTM
Time	2:10.967 on lap 3	
Podium
First	(Spain) Máximo Quiles	KTM
Second	(Indonesia) Veda Pratama	Honda
Third	(Spain) Álvaro Carpe	KTM

The 2026 Malaysian motorcycle Grand Prix (officially known as the Petronas Grand Prix of Malaysia) was the nineteenth round of the 2026 Grand Prix motorcycle racing season. All races were held at the Sepang International Circuit in Sepang on 1 November 2026.

== MotoGP Sprint ==
The MotoGP Sprint was held on 31 October 2026.

Pos.	No.	Rider	Team	Manufacturer	Laps	Time/Retired	Grid	Points
1	37	(Spain) Pedro Acosta	Red Bull KTM Factory Racing	KTM	10	20:04.098	3	12
2	93	(Spain) Marc Márquez	Ducati Lenovo Team	Ducati	10	+0.578	2	9
3	72	(Italy) Marco Bezzecchi	Aprilia Racing	Aprilia	10	+1.310	5	7
4	79	(Japan) Ai Ogura	SuperFile Trackhouse MotoGP Team	Aprilia	10	+1.793	4	6
5	49	(Italy) Fabio Di Giannantonio	Pertamina Enduro VR46 Racing Team	Ducati	10	+5.053	6	5
6	63	(Italy) Francesco Bagnaia	Ducati Lenovo Team	Ducati	10	+8.330	10	4
7	33	(South Africa) Brad Binder	Red Bull KTM Factory Racing	KTM	10	+8.484	15	3
8	11	(Brazil) Diogo Moreira	Pro Honda LCR	Honda	10	+9.001	14	2
9	23	(Italy) Enea Bastianini	Red Bull KTM Tech3	KTM	10	+9.101	7	1
10	5	(France) Johann Zarco	Castrol Honda LCR	Honda	10	+9.545	8	
11	20	(France) Fabio Quartararo	Monster Energy Yamaha MotoGP Team	Yamaha	10	+10.076	18	
12	42	(Spain) Álex Rins	Monster Energy Yamaha MotoGP Team	Yamaha	10	+12.250	17	
13	10	(Italy) Luca Marini	Honda HRC Castrol	Honda	10	+12.715	13	
14	47	(Spain) Augusto Fernández	Prima Pramac Yamaha MotoGP	Yamaha	10	+14.878	20	
15	12	(Spain) Maverick Viñales	Red Bull KTM Tech3	KTM	10	+1:42.843	12	
16	36	(Spain) Joan Mir	Honda HRC Castrol	Honda	10	+1:43.826	11	
17	21	(Italy) Franco Morbidelli	Pertamina Enduro VR46 Racing Team	Ducati	10	+1:45.065	9	
18	27	(Spain) Iker Lecuona	BK8 Gresini Racing MotoGP	Ducati	10	+1:56.425	19	
Ret	73	(Spain) Álex Márquez	BK8 Gresini Racing MotoGP	Ducati	2	Accident	1	
Ret	43	(Australia) Jack Miller	Prima Pramac Yamaha MotoGP	Yamaha	2	Retired	16	
DNS	89	(Spain) Jorge Martín	Aprilia Racing	Aprilia		Injury		
DNS	25	(Spain) Raúl Fernández	SuperFile Trackhouse MotoGP Team	Aprilia		Injury		
Fastest sprint lap: (Spain) Pedro Acosta (KTM) - 1:58.196 (lap 2)
Official MotoGP Sprint Report

== Race ==
=== MotoGP ===
Pos.	No.	Rider	Team	Manufacturer	Laps	Time/Retired	Grid	Points
1	93	(Spain) Marc Márquez	Ducati Lenovo Team	Ducati	20	40:14.236	2	25
2	37	(Spain) Pedro Acosta	Red Bull KTM Factory Racing	KTM	20	+4.172	3	20
3	73	(Spain) Álex Márquez	BK8 Gresini Racing MotoGP	Ducati	20	+5.955	1	16
4	79	(Japan) Ai Ogura	SuperFile Trackhouse MotoGP Team	Aprilia	20	+6.759	4	13
5	23	(Italy) Enea Bastianini	Red Bull KTM Tech3	KTM	20	+10.896	7	11
6	72	(Italy) Marco Bezzecchi	Aprilia Racing	Aprilia	20	+11.259	5	10
7	10	(Italy) Luca Marini	Honda HRC Castrol	Honda	20	+17.724	13	9
8	49	(Italy) Fabio Di Giannantonio	Pertamina Enduro VR46 Racing Team	Ducati	20	+17.790	6	8
9	33	(South Africa) Brad Binder	Red Bull KTM Factory Racing	KTM	20	+23.729	15	7
10	21	(Italy) Franco Morbidelli	Pertamina Enduro VR46 Racing Team	Ducati	20	+25.097	9	6
11	20	(France) Fabio Quartararo	Monster Energy Yamaha MotoGP Team	Yamaha	20	+25.826	18	5
12	42	(Spain) Álex Rins	Monster Energy Yamaha MotoGP Team	Yamaha	20	+27.063	17	4
13	63	(Italy) Francesco Bagnaia	Ducati Lenovo Team	Ducati	20	+32.960	10	3
14	12	(Spain) Maverick Viñales	Red Bull KTM Tech3	KTM	20	+34.597	12	2
15	27	(Spain) Iker Lecuona	BK8 Gresini Racing MotoGP	Ducati	20	+38.446	19	1
16	43	(Australia) Jack Miller	Prima Pramac Yamaha MotoGP	Yamaha	20	+43.327	16	
Ret	5	(France) Johann Zarco	Castrol Honda LCR	Honda	17	Technical	8	
Ret	11	(Brazil) Diogo Moreira	Pro Honda LCR	Honda	14	Accident damage	14	
Ret	36	(Spain) Joan Mir	Honda HRC Castrol	Honda	9	Fatigue	11	
Ret	47	(Spain) Augusto Fernández	Prima Pramac Yamaha MotoGP	Yamaha	1	Accident	20	
DNS	89	(Spain) Jorge Martín	Aprilia Racing	Aprilia		Injury		
DNS	25	(Spain) Raúl Fernández	SuperFile Trackhouse MotoGP Team	Aprilia		Injury		
Fastest lap: (Spain) Pedro Acosta (KTM) – 1:59.261 (lap 2)
Official MotoGP Race Report

== Championship standings after the race ==
Below are the standings for the top five riders, constructors, and teams after the round.

=== MotoGP ===
Riders' Championship standings

Pos.	Rider	Points
1	(Spain) Marc Márquez	399
2	(Spain) Jorge Martín	355
3	(Italy) Marco Bezzecchi	332
4	(Spain) Pedro Acosta	295
5	(Japan) Ai Ogura	278

Constructors' Championship standings

	Pos.	Constructor	Points
1	1	(Italy) Ducati	537
1	2	(Italy) Aprilia	529
	3	(Austria) KTM	348
	4	(Japan) Honda	178
	5	(Japan) Yamaha	105

Teams' Championship standings

Pos.	Team	Points
1	(Italy) Aprilia Racing	687
2	(Italy) Ducati Lenovo Team	572
3	(United States) SuperFile Trackhouse MotoGP Team	514
4	(Austria) Red Bull KTM Factory Racing	413
5	(Italy) BK8 Gresini Racing MotoGP	333

=== Moto2 ===
Riders' Championship standings

	Pos.	Rider	Points
	1	(Spain) Manuel González	276.5
	2	(Spain) Izan Guevara	273
	3	(Spain) Iván Ortolá	199.5
1	4	(Colombia) David Alonso	191
1	5	(Spain) Daniel Holgado	190

Constructors' Championship standings

Pos.	Constructor	Points
1	(Germany) Kalex	417.5
2	(Italy) Boscoscuro	294
3	(Switzerland) Forward	69

Teams' Championship standings

	Pos.	Team	Points
	1	(Germany) Liqui Moly Dynavolt Intact GP	442.5
	2	(Spain) CFMoto RCB Aspar Team	381
	3	(Italy) Blu Cru Pramac Yamaha Moto2	290.5
1	4	(Spain) QJMotor – MSi	219.5
1	5	(United States) OnlyFans American Racing Team	199

=== Moto3 ===
Riders' Championship standings

Pos.	Rider	Points
1	(Spain) Máximo Quiles	376
2	(Spain) David Almansa	228
3	(Spain) Brian Uriarte	205
4	(Spain) Álvaro Carpe	205
5	(Spain) Adrián Fernández	157

Constructors' Championship standings

Pos.	Constructor	Points
1	(Austria) KTM	445
2	(Japan) Honda	233

Teams' Championship standings

Pos.	Team	Points
1	(Spain) CFMoto Gaviota Aspar Team	516
2	(Finland) Red Bull KTM Ajo	410
3	(Germany) Liqui Moly Dynavolt Intact GP	304
4	(Luxembourg) Leopard Racing	238
5	(France) Red Bull KTM Tech3	210

Previous race: 2026 Australian Grand Prix	FIM Grand Prix World Championship; 2026 season	Next race: 2026 Qatar Grand Prix
Previous race: 2025 Malaysian Grand Prix	Malaysian motorcycle Grand Prix	Next race: 2027 Malaysian Grand Prix
