= List of MotoGP sprint race winners =

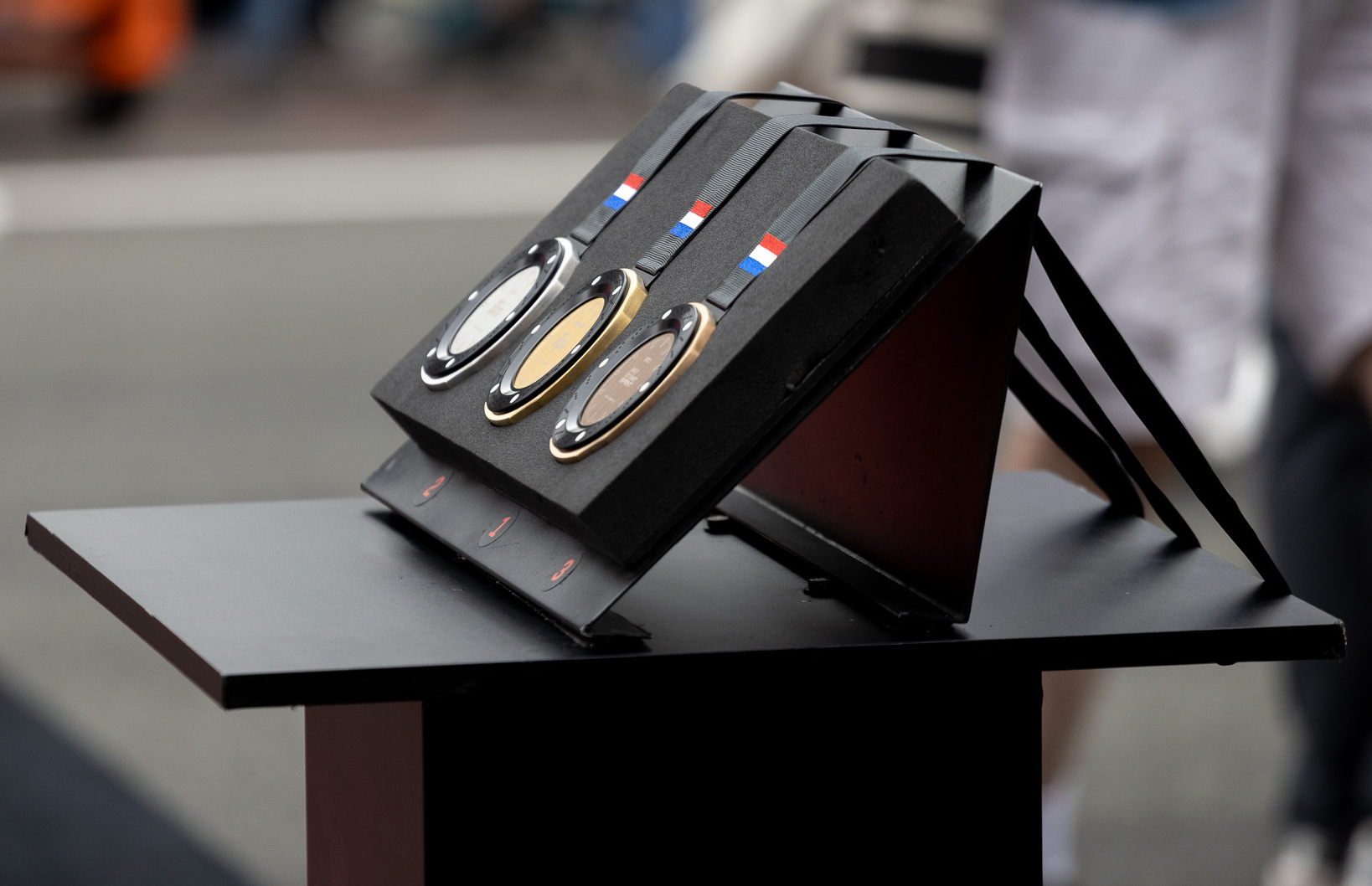
Medals awarded for the top 3 finishers of MotoGP sprint race at 2025 Dutch TT

Grand Prix motorcycle racing is the premier championship of motorcycle road racing, which has been divided into three classes: MotoGP, Moto2, and Moto3. Former classes that have been discontinued include 350cc, 250cc, 125cc, 50cc/80cc, MotoE, and Sidecar. The premier class is MotoGP, which was formerly known as the 500cc class. The Grand Prix Road-Racing World Championship was established in 1949 by the sport's governing body, the Fédération Internationale de Motocyclisme (FIM), and is the oldest motorsport world championship in existence.

Sprint races were introduced at all Grands Prix in 2023. Marc Márquez holds the record for the most sprint race wins recorded with 25.

== By rider ==
As of the 2026 Portuguese MotoGP Sprint

Key
*	500cc/MotoGP World Champion
**Bold**	Rider has competed in the 2026 MotoGP season

Grand Prix motorcycle racing sprint race winners
Rank	Country	Rider	Sprint wins	Seasons active in 500cc/MotoGP	First sprint win	Last sprint win
1	ESP	**Marc Márquez***	25	2013–	2024 Aragon MotoGP Sprint	2026 Qatar MotoGP Sprint
2	ESP	**Jorge Martín***	20	2021–	2023 French MotoGP Sprint	2026 Austrian MotoGP Sprint
3	ITA	**Francesco Bagnaia***	14	2019–	2023 Portuguese MotoGP Sprint	2026 Czech MotoGP Sprint
4	ESP	**Álex Márquez**	6	2020–	2023 British MotoGP Sprint	2026 Catalan MotoGP Sprint
5	ITA	**Marco Bezzecchi**	5	2022–	2023 Dutch TT MotoGP Sprint	2026 Portuguese MotoGP Sprint
6	ZAF	**Brad Binder**	2	2020–	2023 Argentine Republic MotoGP Sprint	2023 Spanish MotoGP Sprint
6	ESP	**Maverick Viñales**	2	2015–	2024 Portuguese MotoGP Sprint	2024 Americas MotoGP Sprint
6	ESP	**Aleix Espargaró**	2	2009–2010; 2012–2026	2023 Catalan MotoGP Sprint	2024 Catalan MotoGP Sprint
6	ITA	**Enea Bastianini**	2	2021–	2024 British MotoGP Sprint	2024 Thailand MotoGP Sprint
6	ESP	**Raúl Fernández**	2	2022–	2026 Italian MotoGP Sprint	2026 Dutch TT MotoGP Sprint
6	ESP	**Pedro Acosta**	2	2024–	2026 Thailand MotoGP Sprint	2026 Malaysian MotoGP Sprint

== By nationality ==
As of the 2026 Portuguese MotoGP Sprint

Rank	Country	Sprint wins	Rider(s)
1	Spain	59	7
2	Italy	21	3
3	South Africa	2	1

== By manufacturer ==
As of the 2026 Portuguese MotoGP Sprint

Key
*	500cc/MotoGP World Champion
**Bold**	Constructor has competed in the 2026 MotoGP season

Rank	Country	Manufacturer	Sprint wins	Seasons active	First win	Last win
1	ITA	**Ducati***	64	1965, 1968, 1970–1973, 2003–	2023 Portuguese MotoGP Sprint	2026 Qatar MotoGP Sprint
2	ITA	**Aprilia**	14	1994–1997, 1999–2000, 2002–2004, 2015–	2023 Catalan MotoGP Sprint	2026 Portuguese MotoGP Sprint
3	AUT	**KTM**	4	2016–	2023 Argentine Republic MotoGP Sprint	2026 Malaysian MotoGP Sprint

== By nationality ==
As of the 2026 Portuguese MotoGP Sprint

Rank	Country	Sprint wins	Manufacturer(s)
1	Italy	78	2
2	Austria	4	1

== Sprint winners by race ==
As of the 2026 Portuguese MotoGP Sprint

2023
Round	Grand Prix	Sprint winner	Team	Constructor
1	(Portugal) Portuguese Grand Prix	(Italy) Francesco Bagnaia	(Italy) Ducati Lenovo Team	(Italy) Ducati
2	(Argentina) Argentine Republic Grand Prix	(South Africa) Brad Binder	(Austria) Red Bull KTM Factory Racing	(Austria) KTM
3	(United States) Grand Prix of the Americas	(Italy) Francesco Bagnaia	(Italy) Ducati Lenovo Team	(Italy) Ducati
4	(Spain) Spanish Grand Prix	(South Africa) Brad Binder	(Austria) Red Bull KTM Factory Racing	(Austria) KTM
5	(France) French Grand Prix	(Spain) Jorge Martín	(Italy) Prima Pramac Racing	(Italy) Ducati
6	(Italy) Italian Grand Prix	(Italy) Francesco Bagnaia	(Italy) Ducati Lenovo Team	(Italy) Ducati
7	(Germany) German Grand Prix	(Spain) Jorge Martín	(Italy) Prima Pramac Racing	(Italy) Ducati
8	(Netherlands) Dutch TT	(Italy) Marco Bezzecchi	(Italy) Mooney VR46 Racing Team	(Italy) Ducati
9	(United Kingdom) British Grand Prix	(Spain) Álex Márquez	(Italy) Gresini Racing MotoGP	(Italy) Ducati
10	(Austria) Austrian Grand Prix	(Italy) Francesco Bagnaia	(Italy) Ducati Lenovo Team	(Italy) Ducati
11	(Catalonia) Catalan Grand Prix	(Spain) Aleix Espargaró	(Italy) Aprilia Racing	(Italy) Aprilia
12	San Marino Grand Prix	(Spain) Jorge Martín	(Italy) Prima Pramac Racing	(Italy) Ducati
13	(India) Indian Grand Prix	(Spain) Jorge Martín	(Italy) Prima Pramac Racing	(Italy) Ducati
14	(Japan) Japanese Grand Prix	(Spain) Jorge Martín	(Italy) Prima Pramac Racing	(Italy) Ducati
15	(Indonesia) Indonesian Grand Prix	(Spain) Jorge Martín	(Italy) Prima Pramac Racing	(Italy) Ducati
16	(Australia) Australian Grand Prix	Sprint cancelled (Note: The Sprint was cancelled due to inclement weather. It was originally scheduled to take place after the Moto2 race on Sunday.)		
17	Thailand Grand Prix	(Spain) Jorge Martín	(Italy) Prima Pramac Racing	(Italy) Ducati
18	(Malaysia) Malaysian Grand Prix	(Spain) Álex Márquez	(Italy) Gresini Racing MotoGP	(Italy) Ducati
19	Qatar Grand Prix	(Spain) Jorge Martín	(Italy) Prima Pramac Racing	(Italy) Ducati
20	(Valencian Community) Valencian Grand Prix	(Spain) Jorge Martín	(Italy) Prima Pramac Racing	(Italy) Ducati

2024
Round	Grand Prix	Sprint winner	Team	Constructor
1	Qatar Grand Prix	(Spain) Jorge Martín	(Italy) Prima Pramac Racing	(Italy) Ducati
2	(Portugal) Portuguese Grand Prix	(Spain) Maverick Viñales	(Italy) Aprilia Racing	(Italy) Aprilia
3	(United States) Grand Prix of the Americas	(Spain) Maverick Viñales	(Italy) Aprilia Racing	(Italy) Aprilia
4	(Spain) Spanish Grand Prix	(Spain) Jorge Martín	(Italy) Prima Pramac Racing	(Italy) Ducati
5	(France) French Grand Prix	(Spain) Jorge Martín	(Italy) Prima Pramac Racing	(Italy) Ducati
6	(Catalonia) Catalan Grand Prix	(Spain) Aleix Espargaró	(Italy) Aprilia Racing	(Italy) Aprilia
7	(Italy) Italian Grand Prix	(Italy) Francesco Bagnaia	(Italy) Ducati Lenovo Team	(Italy) Ducati
8	(Netherlands) Dutch TT	(Italy) Francesco Bagnaia	(Italy) Ducati Lenovo Team	(Italy) Ducati
9	(Germany) German Grand Prix	(Spain) Jorge Martín	(Italy) Prima Pramac Racing	(Italy) Ducati
10	(United Kingdom) British Grand Prix	(Italy) Enea Bastianini	(Italy) Ducati Lenovo Team	(Italy) Ducati
11	(Austria) Austrian Grand Prix	(Italy) Francesco Bagnaia	(Italy) Ducati Lenovo Team	(Italy) Ducati
12	Aragon Grand Prix	(Spain) Marc Márquez	(Italy) Gresini Racing MotoGP	(Italy) Ducati
13	San Marino Grand Prix	(Spain) Jorge Martín	(Italy) Prima Pramac Racing	(Italy) Ducati
14	(Emilia-Romagna) Emilia Romagna Grand Prix	(Italy) Francesco Bagnaia	(Italy) Ducati Lenovo Team	(Italy) Ducati
15	(Indonesia) Indonesian Grand Prix	(Italy) Francesco Bagnaia	(Italy) Ducati Lenovo Team	(Italy) Ducati
16	(Japan) Japanese Grand Prix	(Italy) Francesco Bagnaia	(Italy) Ducati Lenovo Team	(Italy) Ducati
17	(Australia) Australian Grand Prix	(Spain) Jorge Martín	(Italy) Prima Pramac Racing	(Italy) Ducati
18	Thailand Grand Prix	(Italy) Enea Bastianini	(Italy) Ducati Lenovo Team	(Italy) Ducati
19	(Malaysia) Malaysian Grand Prix	(Spain) Jorge Martín	(Italy) Prima Pramac Racing	(Italy) Ducati
20	Solidarity Grand Prix	(Italy) Francesco Bagnaia	(Italy) Ducati Lenovo Team	(Italy) Ducati

2025
Round	Grand Prix	Sprint winner	Team	Constructor
1	Thailand Grand Prix	(Spain) Marc Márquez	(Italy) Ducati Lenovo Team	(Italy) Ducati
2	(Argentina) Argentine Grand Prix	(Spain) Marc Márquez	(Italy) Ducati Lenovo Team	(Italy) Ducati
3	(United States) Grand Prix of the Americas	(Spain) Marc Márquez	(Italy) Ducati Lenovo Team	(Italy) Ducati
4	Qatar Grand Prix	(Spain) Marc Márquez	(Italy) Ducati Lenovo Team	(Italy) Ducati
5	(Spain) Spanish Grand Prix	(Spain) Marc Márquez	(Italy) Ducati Lenovo Team	(Italy) Ducati
6	(France) French Grand Prix	(Spain) Marc Márquez	(Italy) Ducati Lenovo Team	(Italy) Ducati
7	(United Kingdom) British Grand Prix	(Spain) Álex Márquez	(Italy) BK8 Gresini Racing MotoGP	(Italy) Ducati
8	Aragon Grand Prix	(Spain) Marc Márquez	(Italy) Ducati Lenovo Team	(Italy) Ducati
9	(Italy) Italian Grand Prix	(Spain) Marc Márquez	(Italy) Ducati Lenovo Team	(Italy) Ducati
10	(Netherlands) Dutch TT	(Spain) Marc Márquez	(Italy) Ducati Lenovo Team	(Italy) Ducati
11	(Germany) German Grand Prix	(Spain) Marc Márquez	(Italy) Ducati Lenovo Team	(Italy) Ducati
12	(Czech Republic) Czech Grand Prix	(Spain) Marc Márquez	(Italy) Ducati Lenovo Team	(Italy) Ducati
13	(Austria) Austrian Grand Prix	(Spain) Marc Márquez	(Italy) Ducati Lenovo Team	(Italy) Ducati
14	(Hungary) Hungarian Grand Prix	(Spain) Marc Márquez	(Italy) Ducati Lenovo Team	(Italy) Ducati
15	(Catalonia) Catalan Grand Prix	(Spain) Marc Márquez	(Italy) Ducati Lenovo Team	(Italy) Ducati
16	San Marino Grand Prix	(Italy) Marco Bezzecchi	(Italy) Aprilia Racing	(Italy) Aprilia
17	(Japan) Japanese Grand Prix	(Italy) Francesco Bagnaia	(Italy) Ducati Lenovo Team	(Italy) Ducati
18	(Indonesia) Indonesian Grand Prix	(Italy) Marco Bezzecchi	(Italy) Aprilia Racing	(Italy) Aprilia
19	(Australia) Australian Grand Prix	(Italy) Marco Bezzecchi	(Italy) Aprilia Racing	(Italy) Aprilia
20	(Malaysia) Malaysian Grand Prix	(Italy) Francesco Bagnaia	(Italy) Ducati Lenovo Team	(Italy) Ducati
21	(Portugal) Portuguese Grand Prix	(Spain) Álex Márquez	(Italy) BK8 Gresini Racing MotoGP	(Italy) Ducati
22	(Valencian Community) Valencian Grand Prix	(Spain) Álex Márquez	(Italy) BK8 Gresini Racing MotoGP	(Italy) Ducati

2026
Round	Grand Prix	Sprint winner	Team	Constructor
1	Thailand Grand Prix	(Spain) Pedro Acosta	(Austria) Red Bull KTM Factory Racing	(Austria) KTM
2	(Brazil) Brazilian Grand Prix	(Spain) Marc Márquez	(Italy) Ducati Lenovo Team	(Italy) Ducati
3	United States Grand Prix	(Spain) Jorge Martín	(Italy) Aprilia Racing	(Italy) Aprilia
4	(Spain) Spanish Grand Prix	(Spain) Marc Márquez	(Italy) Ducati Lenovo Team	(Italy) Ducati
5	(France) French Grand Prix	(Spain) Jorge Martín	(Italy) Aprilia Racing	(Italy) Aprilia
6	(Catalonia) Catalan Grand Prix	(Spain) Álex Márquez	(Italy) BK8 Gresini Racing MotoGP	(Italy) Ducati
7	(Italy) Italian Grand Prix	(Spain) Raúl Fernández	(United States) Trackhouse MotoGP Team	(Italy) Aprilia
8	(Hungary) Hungarian Grand Prix	(Spain) Marc Márquez	(Italy) Ducati Lenovo Team	(Italy) Ducati
9	(Czech Republic) Czech Grand Prix	(Italy) Francesco Bagnaia	(Italy) Ducati Lenovo Team	(Italy) Ducati
10	(Netherlands) Dutch TT	(Spain) Raúl Fernández	(United States) SuperFile Trackhouse MotoGP Team	(Italy) Aprilia
11	(Germany) German Grand Prix	(Spain) Marc Márquez	(Italy) Ducati Lenovo Team	(Italy) Ducati
12	(United Kingdom) British Grand Prix	(Spain) Jorge Martín	(Italy) Aprilia Racing	(Italy) Aprilia
13	Aragon Grand Prix	(Spain) Marc Márquez	(Italy) Ducati Lenovo Team	(Italy) Ducati
14	San Marino Grand Prix	(Spain) Marc Márquez	(Italy) Ducati Lenovo Team	(Italy) Ducati
15	(Austria) Austrian Grand Prix	(Spain) Jorge Martín	(Italy) Aprilia Racing	(Italy) Aprilia
16	(Japan) Japanese Grand Prix	(Spain) Marc Márquez	(Italy) Ducati Lenovo Team	(Italy) Ducati
17	(Indonesia) Indonesian Grand Prix	(Spain) Marc Márquez	(Italy) Ducati Lenovo Team	(Italy) Ducati
18	(Australia) Australian Grand Prix	(Spain) Marc Márquez	(Italy) Ducati Lenovo Team	(Italy) Ducati
19	(Malaysia) Malaysian Grand Prix	(Spain) Pedro Acosta	(Austria) Red Bull KTM Factory Racing	(Austria) KTM
20	Qatar Grand Prix	(Spain) Marc Márquez	(Italy) Ducati Lenovo Team	(Italy) Ducati
21	(Portugal) Portuguese Grand Prix	(Italy) Marco Bezzecchi	(Italy) Aprilia Racing	(Italy) Aprilia
