= 2023 Spanish motorcycle Grand Prix =

Motorcycle races in Jerez de la Frontera

(Spain) 2023 Spanish Grand Prix
Race details
- Race 4 of 20 races in the 2023 Grand Prix motorcycle racing season
- Date: 30 April 2023
- Official name: Gran Premio MotoGP Guru by Gryfyn de España
- Location: Circuito de Jerez – Ángel Nieto; Jerez de la Frontera, Cádiz, Spain
- Course: Permanent racing facility; 4.423 km (2.748 mi)

MotoGP
Pole position
Rider	(Spain) Aleix Espargaró	Aprilia
Time	1:37.216	
Fastest lap
Rider	(Italy) Francesco Bagnaia	Ducati
Time	1:37.989 on lap 19	
Podium
First	(Italy) Francesco Bagnaia	Ducati
Second	(South Africa) Brad Binder	KTM
Third	(Australia) Jack Miller	KTM

Moto2
Pole position
Rider	(United Kingdom) Sam Lowes	Kalex
Time	1:40.750	
Fastest lap
Rider	(United Kingdom) Sam Lowes	Kalex
Time	1:41.366 on lap 4	
Podium
First	(United Kingdom) Sam Lowes	Kalex
Second	(Spain) Pedro Acosta	Kalex
Third	(Spain) Alonso López	Boscoscuro

Moto3
Pole position
Rider	(Turkey) Deniz Öncü	KTM
Time	1:45.668	
Fastest lap
Rider	(Japan) Ryusei Yamanaka	Gas Gas
Time	1:46.016 on lap 5	
Podium
First	(Spain) Iván Ortolá	KTM
Second	(Colombia) David Alonso	Gas Gas
Third	(Spain) Jaume Masià	Honda

The 2023 Spanish motorcycle Grand Prix (officially known as the Gran Premio MotoGP Guru by Gryfyn de España) was the fourth round of the 2023 Grand Prix motorcycle racing season. It was held at the Circuito de Jerez – Ángel Nieto in Jerez de la Frontera on 30 April 2023.

== Practice session ==
=== MotoGP ===
==== Combined Practice 1-2 ====
The top ten riders (written in bold) qualified for Q2.

Fastest session lap

Pos.	No.	Biker	Constructor	Practice times	
Pos.	No.	Biker	Constructor	P1	P2
1	41	**(Spain) Aleix Espargaró**	**Aprilia**	1:37.090	**1:36.708**
2	12	**(Spain) Maverick Viñales**	**Aprilia**	1:37.389	**1:36.710**
3	26	**(Spain) Dani Pedrosa**	**KTM**	**1:36.770**	1:37.251
4	89	**(Spain) Jorge Martín**	**Ducati**	**1:36.804**	1:37.306
5	43	**(Australia) Jack Miller**	**KTM**	1:37.262	**1:36.835**
6	5	**(France) Johann Zarco**	**Ducati**	1:37.432	**1:36.896**
7	88	**(Portugal) Miguel Oliveira**	**Aprilia**	1:37.633	**1:36.956**
8	73	**(Spain) Álex Márquez**	**Ducati**	1:37.138	**1:37.041**
9	30	**(Japan) Takaaki Nakagami**	**Honda**	**1:37.044**	1:37.483
10	10	**(Italy) Luca Marini**	**Ducati**	**1:37.053**	1:37.276
11	33	(South Africa) Brad Binder	KTM	**1:37.097**	1:37.390
12	72	(Italy) Marco Bezzecchi	Ducati	1:37.682	**1:37.174**
13	1	(Italy) Francesco Bagnaia	Ducati	1:37.388	**1:37.233**
14	25	(Spain) Raúl Fernández	Aprilia	1:38.055	**1:37.403**
15	42	(Spain) Álex Rins	Honda	**1:37.487**	1:38.132
16	20	(France) Fabio Quartararo	Yamaha	1:38.073	**1:37.505**
17	21	(Italy) Franco Morbidelli	Yamaha	1:38.106	**1:37.700**
18	36	(Spain) Joan Mir	Honda	**1:37.850**	1:37.916
19	49	(Italy) Fabio Di Giannantonio	Ducati	1:38.104	**1:37.860**
20	6	(Germany) Stefan Bradl	Honda	1:37.902	**1:37.873**
21	23	(Italy) Enea Bastianini	Ducati	1:38.931	**1:37.985**
22	37	(Spain) Augusto Fernández	KTM	**1:38.278**	1:38.928
23	94	(Germany) Jonas Folger	KTM	1:39.545	**1:38.698**
24	27	(Spain) Iker Lecuona	Honda	1:40.509	**1:39.274**
OFFICIAL MOTOGP COMBINED PRACTICE TIMES REPORT

==== Free practice ====
Pos.	No.	Biker	Constructor	
Pos.	No.	Biker	Constructor	Time results
1	88	(Portugal) Miguel Oliveira	Aprilia	1:37.229
2	20	(France) Fabio Quartararo	Yamaha	1:37.332
3	41	(Spain) Aleix Espargaró	Aprilia	1:37.472
4	21	(Italy) Franco Morbidelli	Yamaha	1:37.512
5	30	(Japan) Takaaki Nakagami	Honda	1:37.524
6	72	(Italy) Marco Bezzecchi	Ducati	1:37.633
7	33	(South Africa) Brad Binder	KTM	1:37.639
8	89	(Spain) Jorge Martín	Ducati	1:37.643
9	73	(Spain) Álex Márquez	Ducati	1:37.647
10	12	(Spain) Maverick Viñales	Aprilia	1:37.665
11	5	(France) Johann Zarco	Ducati	1:37.786
12	1	(Italy) Francesco Bagnaia	Ducati	1:37.816
13	10	(Italy) Luca Marini	Ducati	1:37.866
14	26	(Spain) Dani Pedrosa	KTM	1:37.917
15	43	(Australia) Jack Miller	KTM	1:37.920
16	49	(Italy) Fabio Di Giannantonio	Ducati	1:38.098
17	6	(Germany) Stefan Bradl	Honda	1:38.248
18	36	(Spain) Joan Mir	Honda	1:38.287
19	37	(Spain) Augusto Fernández	KTM	1:38.467
20	25	(Spain) Raúl Fernández	Aprilia	1:38.498
21	42	(Spain) Álex Rins	Honda	1:38.634
22	23	(Italy) Enea Bastianini	Ducati	1:39.093
23	94	(Germany) Jonas Folger	KTM	1:39.535
24	27	(Spain) Iker Lecuona	Honda	1:39.756
OFFICIAL MOTOGP FREE PRACTICE TIMES REPORT

== Qualifying ==
=== MotoGP ===
Fastest session lap

Pos.	No.	Biker	Constructor	Qualifying times		Final grid	Row
Pos.	No.	Biker	Constructor	Q1	Q2	Final grid	Row
1	41	(Spain) Aleix Espargaró	Aprilia	Qualified in Q2	1:37.216	1	1
2	43	(Australia) Jack Miller	KTM	Qualified in Q2	1:37.437	2	1
3	89	(Spain) Jorge Martín	Ducati	Qualified in Q2	1:37.458	3	1
4	33	(South Africa) Brad Binder	KTM	1:36.541	1:37.532	4	2
5	1	(Italy) Francesco Bagnaia	Ducati	1:36.493	1:37.557	5	2
6	26	(Spain) Dani Pedrosa	KTM	Qualified in Q2	1:37.583	6	2
7	88	(Portugal) Miguel Oliveira	Aprilia	Qualified in Q2	1:37.596	7	3
8	5	(France) Johann Zarco	Ducati	Qualified in Q2	1:37.616	8	3
9	10	(Italy) Luca Marini	Ducati	Qualified in Q2	1:37.666	9	3
10	12	(Spain) Maverick Viñales	Aprilia	Qualified in Q2	1:37.765	10	4
11	30	(Japan) Takaaki Nakagami	Honda	Qualified in Q2	1:37.876	11	4
12	73	(Spain) Álex Márquez	Ducati	Qualified in Q2	1:37.920	12	4
13	72	(Italy) Marco Bezzecchi	Ducati	1:36.578	N/A	13	5
14	21	(Italy) Franco Morbidelli	Yamaha	1:36.793	N/A	14	5
15	49	(Italy) Fabio Di Giannantonio	Ducati	1:36.967	N/A	15	5
16	20	(France) Fabio Quartararo	Yamaha	1:37.072	N/A	16	6
17	25	(Spain) Raúl Fernández	Aprilia	1:37.164	N/A	17	6
18	42	(Spain) Álex Rins	Honda	1:37.256	N/A	18	6
19	6	(Germany) Stefan Bradl	Honda	1:37.297	N/A	19	7
20	36	(Spain) Joan Mir	Honda	1:37.346	N/A	20	7
21	37	(Spain) Augusto Fernández	KTM	1:37.753	N/A	21	7
22	94	(Germany) Jonas Folger	KTM	1:38.492	N/A	22	8
23	27	(Spain) Iker Lecuona	Honda	1:38.582	N/A	23	8
24	23	(Italy) Enea Bastianini	Ducati	No time	N/A	24	8
OFFICIAL MOTOGP QUALIFYING RESULTS

=== Moto2 ===
Fastest session lap

Pos.	No.	Biker	Constructor	Qualifying times		Final grid	Row
Pos.	No.	Biker	Constructor	Q1	Q2	Final grid	Row
1	22	(United Kingdom) Sam Lowes	Kalex	Qualified in Q2	1:40.750	1	1
2	37	(Spain) Pedro Acosta	Kalex	Qualified in Q2	1:41.328	2	1
3	96	(United Kingdom) Jake Dixon	Kalex	Qualified in Q2	1:41.330	3	1
4	21	(Spain) Alonso López	Boscoscuro	Qualified in Q2	1:41.459	4	2
5	79	(Japan) Ai Ogura	Kalex	1:41.245	1:41.507	5	2
6	7	(Belgium) Barry Baltus	Kalex	Qualified in Q2	1:41.570	6	2
7	13	(Italy) Celestino Vietti	Kalex	Qualified in Q2	1:41.586	7	3
8	16	(United States) Joe Roberts	Kalex	1:41.765	1:41.653	8	3
9	75	(Spain) Albert Arenas	Kalex	Qualified in Q2	1:41.657	9	3
10	14	(Italy) Tony Arbolino	Kalex	Qualified in Q2	1:41.762	10	4
11	35	(Thailand) Somkiat Chantra	Kalex	Qualified in Q2	1:41.772	11	4
12	40	(Spain) Arón Canet	Kalex	Qualified in Q2	1:41.774	12	4
13	12	(Czech Republic) Filip Salač	Kalex	Qualified in Q2	1:41.801	13	5
14	54	(Spain) Fermín Aldeguer	Boscoscuto	Qualified in Q2	1:41.960	14	5
15	64	(Netherlands) Bo Bendsneyder	Kalex	Qualified in Q2	1:42.045	15	5
16	18	(Spain) Manuel González	Kalex	1:41.937	1:42.052	16	6
17	84	(Netherlands) Zonta van den Goorbergh	Kalex	1:41.807	1:42.071	17	6
18	11	(Spain) Sergio García	Kalex	Qualified in Q2	1:42.587	18	6
19	52	(Spain) Jeremy Alcoba	Kalex	1:41.971	N/A	19	7
20	3	(Germany) Lukas Tulovic	Kalex	1:42.147	N/A	20	7
21	4	(United States) Sean Dylan Kelly	Kalex	1:42.173	N/A	21	7
22	72	(Spain) Borja Gómez	Kalex	1:42.197	N/A	22	8
23	24	(Spain) Marcos Ramírez	Forward	1:42.286	N/A	23	8
24	71	(Italy) Dennis Foggia	Kalex	1:42.435	N/A	24	8
25	19	(Italy) Lorenzo Dalla Porta	Kalex	1:42.676	N/A	25	9
26	28	(Spain) Izan Guevara	Kalex	1:42.953	N/A	26	9
27	33	(United Kingdom) Rory Skinner	Kalex	1:43.011	N/A	27	9
28	8	(Australia) Senna Agius	Kalex	1:43.335	N/A	28	10
29	2	(Japan) Soichiro Minamimoto	Kalex	1:43.788	N/A	29	10
30	17	(Spain) Álex Escrig	Forward	1:44.222	N/A	30	10
OFFICIAL MOTO2 QUALIFYING RESULTS

== MotoGP Sprint ==
The MotoGP Sprint was held on 29 April.

Pos.	No.	Rider	Team	Manufacturer	Laps	Time/Retired	Grid	Points
1	33	(South Africa) Brad Binder	Red Bull KTM Factory Racing	KTM	11	18:07.055	4	12
2	1	(Italy) Francesco Bagnaia	Ducati Lenovo Team	Ducati	11	+0.428	5	9
3	43	(Australia) Jack Miller	Red Bull KTM Factory Racing	KTM	11	+0.680	2	7
4	89	(Spain) Jorge Martín	Prima Pramac Racing	Ducati	11	+0.853	3	6
5	88	(Portugal) Miguel Oliveira	CryptoData RNF MotoGP Team	Aprilia	11	+1.638	7	5
6	26	(Spain) Dani Pedrosa	Red Bull KTM Factory Racing	KTM	11	+1.738	6	4
7	12	(Spain) Maverick Viñales	Aprilia Racing	Aprilia	11	+3.248	10	3
8	5	(France) Johann Zarco	Prima Pramac Racing	Ducati	11	+3.380	8	2
9	72	(Italy) Marco Bezzecchi	Mooney VR46 Racing Team	Ducati	11	+5.711	13	1
10	10	(Italy) Luca Marini	Mooney VR46 Racing Team	Ducati	11	+7.015	9	
11	49	(Italy) Fabio Di Giannantonio	Gresini Racing MotoGP	Ducati	11	+7.174	15	
12	20	(France) Fabio Quartararo	Monster Energy Yamaha MotoGP	Yamaha	11	+7.467	16	
13	42	(Spain) Álex Rins	LCR Honda Castrol	Honda	11	+9.867	18	
14	25	(Spain) Raúl Fernández	CryptoData RNF MotoGP Team	Aprilia	11	+11.550	17	
15	6	(Germany) Stefan Bradl	HRC Team	Honda	11	+15.455	19	
16	21	(Italy) Franco Morbidelli	Monster Energy Yamaha MotoGP	Yamaha	11	+15.849	14	
17	37	(Spain) Augusto Fernández	GasGas Factory Racing Tech3	KTM	11	+15.969	21	
18	27	(Spain) Iker Lecuona	Repsol Honda Team	Honda	11	+25.356	23	
19	94	(Germany) Jonas Folger	GasGas Factory Racing Tech3	KTM	11	+25.530	22	
Ret	36	(Spain) Joan Mir	Repsol Honda Team	Honda	7	Accident Damage	20	
Ret	41	(Spain) Aleix Espargaró	Aprilia Racing	Aprilia	5	Accident	1	
Ret	30	(Japan) Takaaki Nakagami	LCR Honda Idemitsu	Honda	3	Accident	11	
Ret	73	(Spain) Álex Márquez	Gresini Racing MotoGP	Ducati	3	Accident	12	
DNS	23	(Italy) Enea Bastianini	Ducati Lenovo Team	Ducati		Did not start		
Fastest sprint lap: (Spain) Dani Pedrosa (KTM) – 1:37.927 (lap 2)
OFFICIAL MOTOGP SPRINT REPORT

- Enea Bastianini withdrew from the sprint and the main race after experiencing pain from a previous injury.

== Race ==
=== MotoGP ===
The race, scheduled to be run for 25 laps, was red-flagged during the first lap due to an accident involving Miguel Oliveira and Fabio Quartararo. The race was later restarted over 24 laps with the original starting grid.

Pos.	No.	Rider	Team	Manufacturer	Laps	Time/Retired	Grid	Points
1	1	(Italy) Francesco Bagnaia	Ducati Lenovo Team	Ducati	24	39:29.085	5	25
2	33	(South Africa) Brad Binder	Red Bull KTM Factory Racing	KTM	24	+0.221	4	20
3	43	(Australia) Jack Miller	Red Bull KTM Factory Racing	KTM	24	+1.119	2	16
4	89	(Spain) Jorge Martín	Prima Pramac Racing	Ducati	24	+1.942	3	13
5	41	(Spain) Aleix Espargaró	Aprilia Racing	Aprilia	24	+4.760	1	11
6	10	(Italy) Luca Marini	Mooney VR46 Racing Team	Ducati	24	+6.329	9	10
7	26	(Spain) Dani Pedrosa	Red Bull KTM Factory Racing	KTM	24	+6.371	6	9
8	73	(Spain) Álex Márquez	Gresini Racing MotoGP	Ducati	24	+14.952	12	8
9	30	(Japan) Takaaki Nakagami	LCR Honda Idemitsu	Honda	24	+15.692	11	7
10	20	(France) Fabio Quartararo	Monster Energy Yamaha MotoGP	Yamaha	24	+15.846	16	6
11	21	(Italy) Franco Morbidelli	Monster Energy Yamaha MotoGP	Yamaha	24	+17.209	14	5
12	49	(Italy) Fabio Di Giannantonio	Gresini Racing MotoGP	Ducati	24	+17.911	15	4
13	37	(Spain) Augusto Fernández	GasGas Factory Racing Tech3	KTM	24	+19.010	21	3
14	6	(Germany) Stefan Bradl	HRC Team	Honda	24	+27.294	19	2
15	25	(Spain) Raúl Fernández	CryptoData RNF MotoGP Team	Aprilia	24	+36.371	17	1
16	27	(Spain) Iker Lecuona	Repsol Honda Team	Honda	24	+36.753	23	
17	94	(Germany) Jonas Folger	GasGas Factory Racing Tech3	KTM	24	+47.146	22	
Ret	12	(Spain) Maverick Viñales	Aprilia Racing	Aprilia	23	Snapped chain	10	
Ret	5	(France) Johann Zarco	Prima Pramac Racing	Ducati	16	Accident	8	
Ret	72	(Italy) Marco Bezzecchi	Mooney VR46 Racing Team	Ducati	16	Accident	13	
Ret	42	(Spain) Álex Rins	LCR Honda Castrol	Honda	2	Accident damage	18	
Ret	36	(Spain) Joan Mir	Repsol Honda Team	Honda	1	Accident	20	
Ret	88	(Portugal) Miguel Oliveira	CryptoData RNF MotoGP Team	Aprilia	0	Did not restart	7	
DNS	23	(Italy) Enea Bastianini	Ducati Lenovo Team	Ducati		Did not start		
Fastest lap: (Italy) Francesco Bagnaia (Ducati) – 1:37.989 (lap 19)
OFFICIAL MOTOGP RACE REPORT

=== Moto2 ===
Pos.	No.	Biker	Constructor	Laps	Time/Retired	Grid	Points
1	22	(United Kingdom) Sam Lowes	Kalex	21	35:45.107	1	25
2	37	(Spain) Pedro Acosta	Kalex	21	+2.841	2	20
3	21	(Spain) Alonso López	Boscoscuro	21	+9.618	4	16
4	14	(Italy) Tony Arbolino	Kalex	21	+10.163	10	12
5	40	(Spain) Arón Canet	Kalex	21	+11.056	12	11
6	96	(United Kingdom) Jake Dixon	Kalex	21	+11.923	3	10
7	35	(Thailand) Somkiat Chantra	Kalex	21	+12.586	11	9
8	75	(Spain) Albert Arenas	Kalex	21	+14.948	9	8
9	12	(Czech Republic) Filip Salač	Kalex	21	+16.470	13	7
10	54	(Spain) Fermín Aldeguer	Boscoscuro	21	+18.550	14	6
11	11	(Spain) Sergio García	Kalex	21	+22.134	18	5
12	18	(Spain) Manuel González	Kalex	21	+22.817	16	4
13	7	(Belgium) Barry Baltus	Kalex	21	+23.080	6	3
14	16	(United States) Joe Roberts	Kalex	21	+25.110	8	2
15	3	(Germany) Lukas Tulovic	Kalex	21	+26.709	20	1
16	52	(Spain) Jeremy Alcoba	Kalex	21	+26.922	19	
17	64	(Netherlands) Bo Bendsneyder	Kalex	21	+28.568	15	
18	71	(Italy) Dennis Foggia	Kalex	21	+30.384	24	
19	72	(Spain) Borja Gómez	Kalex	21	+33.223	22	
20	24	(Spain) Marcos Ramírez	Forward	21	+36.775	23	
21	8	(Australia) Senna Agius	Kalex	21	+36.812	28	
22	28	(Spain) Izan Guevara	Kalex	21	+37.151	26	
23	84	(Netherlands) Zonta van den Goorbergh	Kalex	21	+39.637	17	
24	33	(United Kingdom) Rory Skinner	Kalex	21	+39.786	27	
25	19	(Italy) Lorenzo Dalla Porta	Kalex	21	+1:02.572	25	
26	2	(Japan) Soichiro Minamimoto	Kalex	21	+1:03.282	29	
Ret	79	(Japan) Ai Ogura	Kalex	12	Accident damage	5	
Ret	4	(United States) Sean Dylan Kelly	Kalex	7	Accident	21	
Ret	13	(Italy) Celestino Vietti	Kalex	1	Accident damage	7	
Fastest lap: (United Kingdom) Sam Lowes (Kalex) – 1:41.366 (lap 4)
OFFICIAL MOTO2 RACE REPORT

=== Moto3 ===
Pos.	No.	Biker	Constructor	Laps	Time/Retired	Grid	Points
1	48	(Spain) Iván Ortolá	KTM	19	33:57.506	2	25
2	80	(Colombia) David Alonso	Gas Gas	19	+0.034	16	20
3	5	(Spain) Jaume Masià	Honda	19	+0.215	4	16
4	71	(Japan) Ayumu Sasaki	Husqvarna	19	+0.422	7	13
5	99	(Spain) José Antonio Rueda	KTM	19	+0.549	9	11
6	96	(Spain) Daniel Holgado	KTM	19	+0.640	6	10
7	43	(Spain) Xavier Artigas	CFMoto	19	+0.738	8	9
8	24	(Japan) Tatsuki Suzuki	Honda	19	+1.991	15	8
9	53	(Turkey) Deniz Öncü	KTM	19	+3.862	1	7
10	10	(Brazil) Diogo Moreira	KTM	19	+4.397	13	6
11	55	(Italy) Romano Fenati	Honda	19	+4.412	3	5
12	19	(United Kingdom) Scott Ogden	Honda	19	+4.722	10	4
13	18	(Italy) Matteo Bertelle	Honda	19	+10.012	17	3
14	7	(Italy) Filippo Farioli	KTM	19	+11.335	22	2
15	82	(Italy) Stefano Nepa	KTM	19	+11.613	21	1
16	72	(Japan) Taiyo Furusato	Honda	19	+14.667	23	
17	16	(Italy) Andrea Migno	KTM	19	+16.525	14	
18	66	(Australia) Joel Kelso	CFMoto	19	+26.905	11	
19	64	(Indonesia) Mario Aji	Honda	19	+30.347	26	
20	92	(Spain) David Almansa	CFMoto	19	+33.542	27	
21	63	(Malaysia) Syarifuddin Azman	KTM	19	+33.578	28	
22	22	(Spain) Ana Carrasco	KTM	19	+33.671	24	
23	95	(Netherlands) Collin Veijer	Husqvarna	19	+35.488	19	
24	70	(United Kingdom) Joshua Whatley	Honda	19	+35.734	25	
25	6	(Japan) Ryusei Yamanaka	Gas Gas	18	+1 lap	5	
Ret	27	(Japan) Kaito Toba	Honda	14	Accident damage	12	
Ret	54	(Italy) Riccardo Rossi	Honda	8	Accident	20	
Ret	38	(Spain) David Salvador	KTM	5	Accident	18	
DNS	44	(Spain) David Muñoz	KTM		Did not start		
Fastest lap: (Japan) Ryusei Yamanaka (Honda) – 1:46.016 (lap 5)
OFFICIAL MOTO3 RACE REPORT

- David Muñoz withdrew from the race after suffering a left heel fracture from a crash in Q2.

== Championship standings after the race ==
Below are the standings for the top five riders, constructors, and teams after the round.

=== MotoGP ===
Riders' Championship standings

	Pos.	Rider	Points
1	1	(Italy) Francesco Bagnaia	87
1	2	(Italy) Marco Bezzecchi	65
6	3	(South Africa) Brad Binder	62
8	4	(Australia) Jack Miller	49
1	5	(Spain) Maverick Viñales	48

Constructors' Championship standings

	Pos.	Constructor	Points
	1	(Italy) Ducati	137
2	2	(Austria) KTM	81
	3	(Italy) Aprilia	67
2	4	(Japan) Honda	61
	5	(Japan) Yamaha	49

Teams' Championship standings

	Pos.	Team	Points
	1	(Italy) Mooney VR46 Racing Team	113
4	2	(Austria) Red Bull KTM Factory Racing	111
1	3	(Italy) Prima Pramac Racing	94
1	4	(Italy) Ducati Lenovo Team	92
2	5	(Italy) Aprilia Racing	77

=== Moto2 ===
Riders' Championship standings

	Pos.	Rider	Points
1	1	(Spain) Pedro Acosta	74
1	2	(Italy) Tony Arbolino	74
	3	(Spain) Arón Canet	52
1	4	(Spain) Alonso López	45
6	5	(United Kingdom) Sam Lowes	43

Constructors' Championship standings

Pos.	Constructor	Points
1	(Germany) Kalex	100
2	(Italy) Boscoscuro	49

Teams' Championship standings

	Pos.	Team	Points
	1	(Belgium) Elf Marc VDS Racing Team	117
	2	(Finland) Red Bull KTM Ajo	101
	3	(Spain) Pons Wegow Los40	69
1	4	(Italy) CAG Speed Up	65
1	5	(Italy) QJmotor Gresini Moto2	59

=== Moto3 ===
Riders' Championship standings

	Pos.	Rider	Points
	1	(Spain) Daniel Holgado	59
	2	(Brazil) Diogo Moreira	55
3	3	(Spain) Iván Ortolá	50
	4	(Spain) Jaume Masià	47
2	5	(Spain) Xavier Artigas	41

Constructors' Championship standings

Pos.	Constructor	Points
1	(Austria) KTM	95
2	(Japan) Honda	72
3	(China) CFMoto	41
4	(Spain) Gas Gas	35
5	(Sweden) Husqvarna	26

Teams' Championship standings

	Pos.	Team	Points
	1	(Luxembourg) Leopard Racing	82
2	2	(Italy) Angeluss MTA Team	70
	3	(France) Red Bull KTM Tech3	61
2	4	(Spain) MT Helmets – MSi	60
1	5	(Finland) Red Bull KTM Ajo	53

Previous race: 2023 Grand Prix of the Americas	FIM Grand Prix World Championship; 2023 season	Next race: 2023 French Grand Prix
Previous race: 2022 Spanish Grand Prix	Spanish motorcycle Grand Prix	Next race: 2024 Spanish Grand Prix
