= 2023 Argentine Republic motorcycle Grand Prix =

Motorcycle races in Termas de Río Hondo

(Argentina) 2023 Argentine Republic Grand Prix
Race details
- Race 2 of 20 races in the 2023 Grand Prix motorcycle racing season
- Date: 2 April 2023
- Official name: Gran Premio Michelin de la República Argentina
- Location: Autódromo Termas de Río Hondo; Termas de Río Hondo, Argentina
- Course: Permanent racing facility; 4.806 km (2.986 mi)

MotoGP
Pole position
Rider	(Spain) Álex Márquez	Ducati
Time	1:43.881	
Fastest lap
Rider	(Italy) Marco Bezzecchi	Ducati
Time	1:45.510 on lap 6	
Podium
First	(Italy) Marco Bezzecchi	Ducati
Second	(France) Johann Zarco	Ducati
Third	(Spain) Álex Márquez	Ducati

Moto2
Pole position
Rider	(Spain) Alonso López	Boscoscuro
Time	1:42.472	
Fastest lap
Rider	(Spain) Alonso López	Boscoscuro
Time	1:52.191 on lap 7	
Podium
First	(Italy) Tony Arbolino	Kalex
Second	(Spain) Alonso López	Boscoscuro
Third	(United Kingdom) Jake Dixon	Kalex

Moto3
Pole position
Rider	(Japan) Ayumu Sasaki	Husqvarna
Time	1:48.539	
Fastest lap
Rider	(Spain) Jaume Masià	Honda
Time	1:55.936 on lap 13	
Podium
First	(Japan) Tatsuki Suzuki	Honda
Second	(Brazil) Diogo Moreira	KTM
Third	(Italy) Andrea Migno	KTM

The 2023 Argentine Republic motorcycle Grand Prix (officially known as the Gran Premio Michelin de la República Argentina) was the second round of the 2023 Grand Prix motorcycle racing season. It was held at the Autódromo Termas de Río Hondo in Termas de Río Hondo on 2 April 2023.

== Background ==
=== Riders' entries ===
In the Moto2 class, after Kohta Nozane suffered an injury at the Portuguese GP, the Correos Prepago Yamaha VR46 Master Camp structure has been forced to find a replacement for this weekend's Grand Prix of the Republic of Argentina. Soichiro Minamimoto joined Manuel Gonzalez at the Autódromo Termas de Río Hondo for the second round of the 2023 Moto2.

In the Moto3 class, Andrea Migno appeared in this race, replacing Lorenzo Fellon of the injured CIP Green Power team. Lorenzo Fellon suffered a shoulder injury due to a severe crash at the Portimao test before the first round. Despite appearing two days over the weekend, his shoulder injury recurred just before the race and he pulled into the pits when the other riders were about to start the race.

David Almansa replaced Joel Kelso at this round.

== Practice session ==
=== MotoGP ===
==== Combined Practice 1-2 ====
The top ten riders (written in bold) qualified for Q2.

Fastest session lap

Pos.	No.	Biker	Constructor	Practice times	
Pos.	No.	Biker	Constructor	P1	P2
1	41	**(Spain) Aleix Espargaró**	**Aprilia**	1:39.491	1:38.518
2	12	**(Spain) Maverick Viñales**	**Aprilia**	1:39.207	1:38.680
3	72	**(Italy) Marco Bezzecchi**	**Ducati**	1:39.700	1:38.767
4	10	**(Italy) Luca Marini**	**Ducati**	1:39.633	1:38.833
5	5	**(France) Johann Zarco**	**Ducati**	1:39.628	1:38.909
6	1	**(Italy) Francesco Bagnaia**	**Ducati**	1:39.751	1:38.944
7	89	**(Spain) Jorge Martín**	**Ducati**	1:39.508	1:39.006
8	30	**(Japan) Takaaki Nakagami**	**Honda**	1:39.583	1:39.071
9	21	**(Italy) Franco Morbidelli**	**Yamaha**	1:39.696	1:39.080
10	42	**(Spain) Álex Rins**	**Honda**	1:39.802	1:39.117
11	73	(Spain) Álex Márquez	Ducati	1:39.610	1:39.184
12	33	(South Africa) Brad Binder	KTM	1:40.264	1:39.202
13	36	(Spain) Joan Mir	Honda	1:40.665	1:39.237
14	20	(France) Fabio Quartararo	Yamaha	1:40.116	1:39.264
15	49	(Italy) Fabio Di Giannantonio	Ducati	1:39.926	1:39.288
16	43	(Australia) Jack Miller	KTM	1:40.037	1:39.376
17	37	(Spain) Augusto Fernández	KTM	1:39.994	1:39.561
18	25	(Spain) Raúl Fernández	Aprilia	1:40.336	1:39.575
OFFICIAL MOTOGP COMBINED PRACTICE TIMES REPORT

==== Free practice ====
Pos.	No.	Biker	Constructor	
Pos.	No.	Biker	Constructor	Time results
1	1	(Italy) Francesco Bagnaia	Ducati	1:41.029
2	72	(Italy) Marco Bezzecchi	Ducati	1:41.064
3	42	(Spain) Álex Rins	Honda	1:41.141
4	12	(Spain) Maverick Viñales	Aprilia	1:41.389
5	73	(Spain) Álex Márquez	Ducati	1:41.529
6	25	(Spain) Raúl Fernández	Aprilia	1:41.706
7	36	(Spain) Joan Mir	Honda	1:41.730
8	30	(Japan) Takaaki Nakagami	Honda	1:42.146
9	41	(Spain) Aleix Espargaró	Aprilia	1:42.231
10	37	(Spain) Augusto Fernández	KTM	1:42.349
11	43	(Australia) Jack Miller	KTM	1:42.626
12	20	(France) Fabio Quartararo	Yamaha	1:42.688
13	10	(Italy) Luca Marini	Ducati	1:43.032
14	89	(Spain) Jorge Martín	Ducati	1:43.167
15	33	(South Africa) Brad Binder	KTM	1:43.792
16	49	(Italy) Fabio Di Giannantonio	Ducati	1:45.460
17	5	(France) Johann Zarco	Ducati	1:45.832
18	21	(Italy) Franco Morbidelli	Yamaha	1:46.534
OFFICIAL MOTOGP FREE PRACTICE TIMES REPORT

=== Moto2 ===
==== Combined Practice 1-2-3 ====
The top fourteen riders (written in bold) qualified for Q2.

Fastest session lap

Pos.	No.	Biker	Constructor	Free practice times		
Pos.	No.	Biker	Constructor	P1	P2	P3
1	14	(Italy) **Tony Arbolino**	**Kalex**	1:44.392	1:43.172	1:46.173
2	12	**(Czech Republic) Filip Salač**	**Kalex**	1:44.383	1:43.238	1:48.472
3	37	**(Spain) Pedro Acosta**	**Kalex**	1:44.480	1:43.252	1:48.164
4	96	**(United Kingdom)** **Jake Dixon**	**Kalex**	1:44.494	1:43.293	1:48.839
5	35	**(Thailand) Somkiat Chantra**	**Kalex**	1:44.243	1:43.298	1:45.749
6	40	**(Spain) Arón Canet**	**Kalex**	1:44.269	1:43.326	1:46.119
7	22	**(United Kingdom)** **Sam Lowes**	**Kalex**	1:44.643	1:43.405	1:46.278
8	54	**(Spain)** **Fermín Aldeguer**	**Boscoscuro**	1:44.530	1:43.440	1:46.133
9	64	**(Netherlands) Bo Bendsneyder**	**Kalex**	1:45.027	1:43.608	1:48.930
10	21	**(Spain) Alonso López**	**Boscoscuro**	1:45.190	1:43.644	1:44.940
11	18	**(Spain) Manuel González**	**Kalex**	1:44.185	1:43.655	1:47.819
12	75	**(Spain) Albert Arenas**	**Kalex**	1:45.522	1:43.743	1:49.747
13	7	**(Belgium) Barry Baltus**	**Kalex**	1:45.910	1:43.974	1:47.507
14	16	(United States) **Joe Roberts**	**Kalex**	1:45.313	1:44.025	1:48.135
15	4	(United States) Sean Dylan Kelly	Kalex	1:45.713	1:44.027	1:47.447
16	13	(Italy) Celestino Vietti	Kalex	1:45.831	1:44.121	1:46.680
17	52	(Spain) Jeremy Alcoba	Kalex	1:44.985	1:44.169	1:47.646
18	15	(South Africa) Darryn Binder	Kalex	1:45.869	1:44.329	1:48.018
19	7	(Italy) Dennis Foggia	Kalex	1:44.911	1:44.531	1:48.949
20	19	(Italy) Lorenzo Dalla Porta	Kalex	1:45.385	1:44.635	1:47.732
21	42	(Spain) Marcos Ramírez	Forward	1:46.387	1:44.666	1:48.018
22	11	(Spain) Sergio García	Kalex	1:45.561	1:44.791	1:46.899
23	81	(Spain) Jordi Torres	Kalex	1:46.469	1:44.926	1:46.209
24	84	(Netherlands) Zonta van den Goorbergh	Kalex	1:45.635	1:44.969	NC
25	72	(Spain) Borja Gómez	Kalex	1:46.532	1:45.195	1:47.298
26	79	(Japan) Ai Ogura	Kalex	1:47.399	1:45.366	NC
27	33	(United Kingdom) Rory Skinner	Kalex	1:45.920	1:45.461	1:47.013
28	98	(Spain) David Sanchis	Forward	1:48.410	1:46.116	1:49.377
29	2	(Japan) Soichiro Minamimoto	Kalex	1:48.915	1:46.814	1:48.858
Source : OFFICIAL MOTO2 COMBINED PRACTICE TIMES REPORT

=== Moto3 ===
==== Combined Practice 1-2-3 ====
The top fourteen riders (written in bold) qualified for Q2.

Fastest session lap

Pos.	No.	Biker	Constructor	Practice times		
Pos.	No.	Biker	Constructor	P1	P2	P3
1	71	**(Japan) Ayumu Sasaki**	**Husqvarna**	1:49.804	**1:48.597**	NC
2	10	**(Brazil) Diogo Moreira**	**KTM**	1:51.107	**1:48.783**	1:55.587
3	5	**(Spain) Jaume Masià**	**Honda**	1:49.813	**1:48.840**	1:57.662
4	24	**(Japan) Tatsuki Suzuki**	**Honda**	1:50.146	**1:49.190**	1:56.855
5	82	(Italy) **Stefano Nepa**	**KTM**	1:51.148	**1:49.380**	1:56.914
6	18	**(Italy) Matteo Bertelle**	**Honda**	1:50.936	**1:49.429**	1:57.640
7	11	**(Japan) Kaito Toba**	**Honda**	1:50.924	**1:49.482**	1:54.569
8	80	**(Colombia) David Alonso**	**Gas Gas**	1:51.395	**1:49.521**	1:56.704
9	19	**(United Kingdom) Scott Ogden**	**Honda**	1:51.082	**1:49.557**	1:55.937
10	96	**(Spain)** **Daniel Holgado**	**KTM**	1:50.180	**1:49.560**	1:56.726
11	95	(Netherlands) **Collin Veijer**	**Husqvarna**	1:52.553	**1:49.562**	NC
12	44	**(Spain) David Muñoz**	**KTM**	1:51.505	**1:49.672**	1:58.253
13	38	**(Italy) Andrea Migno**	**KTM**	1:51.375	**1:49.738**	1:56.557
14	43	(Spain) **Xavier Artigas**	**CFMoto**	1:50.886	**1:49.763**	1:57.397
15	53	(Turkey) Deniz Öncü	KTM	1:51.069	**1:49.822**	1:54.832
16	54	(Italy) Riccardo Rossi	Honda	1:52.175	**1:49.881**	1:55.779
17	99	(Spain) José Antonio Rueda	KTM	1:51.792	**1:50.114**	1:57.016
18	55	(Italy) Romano Fenati	Honda	1:50.673	**1:50.127**	1:53.875
19	48	(Spain) Iván Ortolá	KTM	1:51.349	**1:50.305**	1:56.090
20	63	(Malaysia) Syarifuddin Azman	KTM	1:52.604	**1:50.472**	1:57.155
21	7	(Italy) Filippo Farioli	KTM	1:52.634	**1:50.672**	1:56.584
22	72	(Japan) Taiyo Furusato	Honda	1:52.184	**1:50.866**	1:57.427
23	92	(Spain) David Almansa	CFMoto	1:51.104	**1:50.959**	1:56.882
24	38	(Spain) David Salvador	KTM	1:51.879	**1:51.096**	1:55.130
25	64	(Indonesia) Mario Aji	Honda	1:52.354	**1:51.237**	1:57.212
26	22	(Spain) Ana Carrasco	KTM	1:53.249	**1:51.363**	1:57.451
27	6	(Japan) Ryusei Yamanaka	Gas Gas	**1:51.409**	1:51.413	1:57.266
28	70	(United Kingdom) Joshua Whatley	Honda	1:51.792	**1:51.507**	1:57.159
Source : OFFICIAL MOTO3 COMBINED PRACTICE TIMES REPORT

== Qualifying ==
=== MotoGP ===
Fastest session lap

Pos.	No.	Biker	Constructor	Qualifying times		Final grid	Row
Pos.	No.	Biker	Constructor	Q1	Q2	Final grid	Row
1	73	(Spain) Álex Márquez	Ducati	1:47.317	1:43.881	1	1
2	72	(Italy) Marco Bezzecchi	Ducati	Qualified in Q2	1:44.053	2	1
3	1	(Italy) Francesco Bagnaia	Ducati	Qualified in Q2	1:44.739	3	1
4	21	(Italy) Franco Morbidelli	Yamaha	Qualified in Q2	1:45.982	4	2
5	12	(Spain) Maverick Viñales	Aprilia	Qualified in Q2	1:46.236	5	2
6	5	(France) Johann Zarco	Ducati	Qualified in Q2	1:46.463	6	2
7	10	(Italy) Luca Marini	Ducati	Qualified in Q2	1:46.588	7	3
8	89	(Spain) Jorge Martín	Ducati	Qualified in Q2	1:46.635	8	3
9	41	(Spain) Aleix Espargaró	Aprilia	Qualified in Q2	1:46.878	9	3
10	20	(France) Fabio Quartararo	Yamaha	1:47.385	1:47.122	10	4
11	30	(Japan) Takaaki Nakagami	Honda	Qualified in Q2	1:48.209	11	4
12	42	(Spain) Álex Rins	Honda	Qualified in Q2	1:48.694	12	4
13	25	(Spain) Raúl Fernández	Aprilia	1:47.420	N/A	13	5
14	49	(Italy) Fabio Di Giannantonio	Ducati	1:47.456	N/A	14	5
15	33	(South Africa) Brad Binder	KTM	1:47.511	N/A	15	5
16	43	(Australia) Jack Miller	KTM	1:47.671	N/A	16	6
17	37	(Spain) Augusto Fernández	KTM	1:48.420	N/A	17	6
18	36	(Spain) Joan Mir	Honda	1:48.585	N/A	18	6
OFFICIAL MOTOGP QUALIFYING RESULTS

=== Moto2 ===
Fastest session lap

Pos.	No.	Biker	Constructor	Qualifying times		Final grid	Row
Pos.	No.	Biker	Constructor	Q1	Q2	Final grid	Row
1	21	(Spain) Alonso López	Boscoscuro	Qualified in Q2	1:42.472	1	1
2	40	(Spain) Arón Canet	Kalex	Qualified in Q2	1:42.513	2	1
3	35	(Thailand) Somkiat Chantra	Kalex	Qualified in Q2	1:42.520	3	1
4	96	(United Kingdom) Jake Dixon	Kalex	Qualified in Q2	1:42.586	4	2
5	37	(Spain) Pedro Acosta	Kalex	Qualified in Q2	1:42.674	5	2
6	13	(Italy) Celestino Vietti	Kalex	1:43.415	1:42.692	6	2
7	18	(Spain) Manuel González	Kalex	Qualified in Q2	1:42.795	7	3
8	14	(Italy) Tony Arbolino	Kalex	Qualified in Q2	1:42.965	8	3
9	16	(United States) Joe Roberts	Kalex	Qualified in Q2	1:42.997	9	3
10	75	(Spain) Albert Arenas	Kalex	Qualified in Q2	1:43.021	10	4
11	15	(South Africa) Darryn Binder	Kalex	1:43.404	1:43.032	11	4
12	7	(Belgium) Barry Baltus	Kalex	Qualified in Q2	1:43.065	12	4
13	12	(Czech Republic) Filip Salač	Kalex	Qualified in Q2	1:43.130	13	5
14	22	(United Kingdom) Sam Lowes	Kalex	Qualified in Q2	1:43.135	14	5
15	51	(Spain) Jeremy Alcoba	Kalex	1:43.681	1:43.262	15	5
16	54	(Spain) Fermín Aldeguer	Boscoscuro	Qualified in Q2	1:43.337	16	6
17	64	(Netherlands) Bo Bendsneyder	Kalex	Qualified in Q2	1:43.358	17	6
18	4	(United States) Sean Dylan Kelly	Kalex	1:43.925	1:43.563	18	6
19	42	(Spain) Marcos Ramírez	Forward	1:43.988	N/A	19	7
20	84	(Netherlands) Zonta van den Goorbergh	Kalex	1:44.033	N/A	20	7
21	79	(Japan) Ai Ogura	Kalex	1:44.054	N/A	21	7
22	71	(Italy) Dennis Foggia	Kalex	1:44.059	N/A	22	8
23	81	(Spain) Jordi Torres	Kalex	1:44.204	N/A	23	8
24	19	(Italy) Lorenzo Dalla Porta	Kalex	1:44.233	N/A	24	8
25	33	(United Kingdom) Rory Skinner	Kalex	1:44.409	N/A	25	9
26	98	(Spain) David Sanchis	Forward	1:45.736	N/A	26	9
27	98	(Japan) Soichiro Minamimoto	Kalex	1:46.001	N/A	27	9
28	11	(Spain) Sergio García	Kalex	1:49.983	N/A	28	10
29	72	(Spain) Borja Gómez	Kalex	1:56.412	N/A	29	10
OFFICIAL MOTO2 QUALIFYING RESULTS

=== Moto3 ===
Fastest session lap

Pos.	No.	Biker	Constructor	Qualifying times		Final grid	Row
Pos.	No.	Biker	Constructor	Q1	Q2	Final grid	Row
1	71	(Japan) Ayumu Sasaki	Husqvarna	Qualified in Q2	1:48.539	1	1
2	53	(Turkey) Deniz Öncü	KTM	1:50.117	1:49.142	2	1
3	10	(Brazil) Diogo Moreira	KTM	Qualified in Q2	1:49.214	3	1
4	48	(Spain) Iván Ortolá	KTM	1:50.034	1:49.314	4	2
5	5	(Spain) Jaume Masià	Honda	Qualified in Q2	1:49.344	5	2
6	24	(Japan) Tatsuki Suzuki	KTM	Qualified in Q2	1:49.417	6	2
7	80	(Colombia) David Alonso	Gas Gas	Qualified in Q2	1:49.454	7	3
8	19	(United Kingdom) Scott Ogden	Honda	Qualified in Q2	1:49.545	8	3
9	16	(Italy) Andrea Migno	KTM	Qualified in Q2	1:49.642	9	3
10	96	(Spain) Daniel Holgado	KTM	Qualified in Q2	1:49.665	10	4
11	27	(Japan) Kaito Toba	Honda	Qualified in Q2	1:49.673	11	4
12	18	(Italy) Matteo Bertelle	Honda	Qualified in Q2	1:49.678	12	4
13	99	(Spain) José Antonio Rueda	KTM	1:50.206	1:49.766	13	5
14	82	(Italy) Stefano Nepa	KTM	Qualified in Q2	1:49.778	14	5
15	43	(Spain) Xavier Artigas	KTM	Qualified in Q2	1:49.904	15	5
16	44	(Spain) David Muñoz	KTM	Qualified in Q2	1:50.025	16	6
17	95	(Netherlands) Collin Veijer	Husqvarna	Qualified in Q2	1:50.028	17	6
18	6	(Japan) Ryusei Yamanaka	Gas Gas	1:50.493	1:50.342	18	6
19	54	(Italy) Riccardo Rossi	Honda	1:50.659	N/A	19	7
20	19	(Malaysia) Syarifuddin Azman	KTM	1:50.784	N/A	20	7
21	7	(Italy) Filippo Farioli	KTM	1:50.838	N/A	21	7
22	38	(Spain) David Salvador	KTM	1:50.953	N/A	22	8
23	64	(Indonesia) Mario Aji	Honda	1:51.011	N/A	23	8
24	55	(Italy) Romano Fenati	Honda	1:51.358	N/A	24	8
25	92	(Spain) David Almansa	CFMoto	1:51.697	N/A	25	9
26	72	(Japan) Taiyo Furusato	Honda	1:51.729	N/A	26	9
27	22	(Spain) Ana Carrasco	KTM	1:52.114	N/A	27	9
28	70	(United Kingdom) Joshua Whatley	Honda	1:52.142	N/A	28	10
OFFICIAL MOTO3 QUALIFYING RESULTS

== MotoGP Sprint ==
The MotoGP Sprint was held on 1 April.

Pos.	No.	Rider	Team	Manufacturer	Laps	Time/Retired	Grid	Points
1	33	(South Africa) Brad Binder	Red Bull KTM Factory Racing	KTM	12	19:56.873	15	12
2	72	(Italy) Marco Bezzecchi	Mooney VR46 Racing Team	Ducati	12	+0.072	2	9
3	10	(Italy) Luca Marini	Mooney VR46 Racing Team	Ducati	12	+0.877	7	7
4	21	(Italy) Franco Morbidelli	Monster Energy Yamaha MotoGP	Yamaha	12	+2.354	4	6
5	73	(Spain) Álex Márquez	Gresini Racing MotoGP	Ducati	12	+2.462	1	5
6	1	(Italy) Francesco Bagnaia	Ducati Lenovo Team	Ducati	12	+2.537	3	4
7	12	(Spain) Maverick Viñales	Aprilia Racing	Aprilia	12	+2.643	5	3
8	89	(Spain) Jorge Martín	Prima Pramac Racing	Ducati	12	+3.754	8	2
9	20	(France) Fabio Quartararo	Monster Energy Yamaha MotoGP	Yamaha	12	+3.856	10	1
10	43	(Australia) Jack Miller	Red Bull KTM Factory Racing	KTM	12	+5.143	16	
11	30	(Japan) Takaaki Nakagami	LCR Honda Idemitsu	Honda	12	+5.574	11	
12	5	(France) Johann Zarco	Prima Pramac Racing	Ducati	12	+7.568	6	
13	49	(Italy) Fabio Di Giannantonio	Gresini Racing MotoGP	Ducati	12	+6.965	14	
14	25	(Spain) Raúl Fernández	CryptoData RNF MotoGP Team	Aprilia	12	+7.725	13	
15	42	(Spain) Álex Rins	LCR Honda Castrol	Honda	12	+8.687	12	
16	37	(Spain) Augusto Fernández	GasGas Factory Racing Tech3	KTM	12	+9.040	17	
Ret	41	(Spain) Aleix Espargaró	Aprilia Racing	Aprilia	10	Accident	9	
Ret	36	(Spain) Joan Mir	Repsol Honda Team	Honda	0	Accident	18	
Fastest sprint lap: (Italy) Marco Bezzecchi (Ducati) – 1:38.777 (lap 10)
OFFICIAL MOTOGP SPRINT REPORT

== Warm up ==
=== MotoGP ===
Marco Bezzecchi set the best time 1:45.354 and was the fastest rider at this session ahead of Luca Marini and Jack Miller.

== Race ==
=== MotoGP ===
Pos.	No.	Rider	Team	Manufacturer	Laps	Time/Retired	Grid	Points
1	72	(Italy) Marco Bezzecchi	Mooney VR46 Racing Team	Ducati	25	44:28.518	2	25
2	5	(France) Johann Zarco	Prima Pramac Racing	Ducati	25	+4.085	6	20
3	73	(Spain) Álex Márquez	Gresini Racing MotoGP	Ducati	25	+4.681	1	16
4	21	(Italy) Franco Morbidelli	Monster Energy Yamaha MotoGP	Yamaha	25	+7.581	4	13
5	89	(Spain) Jorge Martín	Prima Pramac Racing	Ducati	25	+9.746	8	11
6	43	(Australia) Jack Miller	Red Bull KTM Factory Racing	KTM	25	+10.562	16	10
7	20	(France) Fabio Quartararo	Monster Energy Yamaha MotoGP	Yamaha	25	+11.095	10	9
8	10	(Italy) Luca Marini	Mooney VR46 Racing Team	Ducati	25	+13.694	7	8
9	42	(Spain) Álex Rins	LCR Honda Castrol	Honda	25	+14.327	12	7
10	49	(Italy) Fabio Di Giannantonio	Gresini Racing MotoGP	Ducati	25	+18.515	14	6
11	37	(Spain) Augusto Fernández	GasGas Factory Racing Tech3	KTM	25	+19.380	17	5
12	12	(Spain) Maverick Viñales	Aprilia Racing	Aprilia	25	+26.091	5	4
13	30	(Japan) Takaaki Nakagami	LCR Honda Idemitsu	Honda	25	+28.394	11	3
14	25	(Spain) Raúl Fernández	CryptoData RNF MotoGP Team	Aprilia	25	+29.894	13	2
15	41	(Spain) Aleix Espargaró	Aprilia Racing	Aprilia	25	+36.183	9	1
16	1	(Italy) Francesco Bagnaia	Ducati Lenovo Team	Ducati	25	+47.753	3	
17	33	(South Africa) Brad Binder	Red Bull KTM Factory Racing	KTM	25	+48.106	15	
DNS	36	(Spain) Joan Mir	Repsol Honda Team	Honda		Did not start	18	
Fastest lap: (Italy) Marco Bezzecchi (Ducati) – 1:45.510 (lap 6)
OFFICIAL MOTOGP RACE REPORT

=== Moto2 ===
Pos.	No.	Biker	Constructor	Laps	Time/Retired	Grid	Points
1	14	(Italy) Tony Arbolino	Kalex	14	26:26.606	8	25
2	21	(Spain) Alonso López	Boscoscuro	14	+0.663	1	20
3	96	(United Kingdom) Jake Dixon	Kalex	14	+1.961	4	16
4	40	(Spain) Arón Canet	Kalex	14	+7.769	2	14
5	11	(Spain) Sergio García	Kalex	14	+11.954	28	11
6	15	(South Africa) Darryn Binder	Kalex	14	+12.274	11	9
7	12	(Czech Republic) Filip Salač	Kalex	14	+13.100	13	9
8	35	(Thailand) Somkiat Chantra	Kalex	14	+13.200	3	8
9	75	(Spain) Albert Arenas	Kalex	14	+13.649	10	7
10	22	(United Kingdom) Sam Lowes	Kalex	14	+14.107	14	6
11	18	(Spain) Manuel González	Kalex	14	+15.581	7	5
12	37	(Spain) Pedro Acosta	Kalex	14	+16.913	5	4
13	13	(Italy) Celestino Vietti	Kalex	14	+17.135	6	3
14	16	(United States) Joe Roberts	Kalex	14	+25.871	9	2
15	54	(Spain) Fermín Aldeguer	Boscoscuro	14	+27.388	16	1
16	81	(Spain) Jordi Torres	Kalex	14	+31.901	23	
17	52	(Spain) Jeremy Alcoba	Kalex	14	+32.583	15	
18	84	(Netherlands) Zonta van den Goorbergh	Kalex	14	+33.523	20	
19	7	(Belgium) Barry Baltus	Kalex	14	+33.755	12	
20	2	(Japan) Soichiro Minamimoto	Kalex	14	+33.918	27	
21	72	(Spain) Borja Gómez	Kalex	14	+48.220	29	
22	64	(Netherlands) Bo Bendsneyder	Kalex	14	+49.932	17	
23	19	(Italy) Lorenzo Dalla Porta	Kalex	14	+55.187	24	
24	24	(Spain) Marcos Ramírez	Forward	14	+55.414	19	
25	71	(Italy) Dennis Foggia	Kalex	14	+55.564	22	
Ret	33	(United Kingdom) Rory Skinner	Kalex	5	Retired	25	
Ret	98	(Spain) David Sanchis	Forward	5	Mechanical	26	
Ret	4	(United States) Sean Dylan Kelly	Kalex	1	Mechanical	18	
DNS	79	(Japan) Ai Ogura	Kalex		Did not start		
Fastest lap: (Spain) Alonso López (Boscoscuro) – 1:52.191 (lap 7)
OFFICIAL MOTO2 RACE REPORT

=== Moto3 ===
Pos.	No.	Biker	Constructor	Laps	Time/Retired	Grid	Points
1	24	(Japan) Tatsuki Suzuki	Honda	18	35:18.099	6	25
2	10	(Brazil) Diogo Moreira	KTM	18	+4.571	3	20
3	16	(Italy) Andrea Migno	KTM	18	+4.699	9	16
4	96	(Spain) Daniel Holgado	KTM	18	+8.814	10	13
5	19	(United Kingdom) Scott Ogden	Honda	18	+11.512	8	11
6	82	(Italy) Stefano Nepa	KTM	18	+11.865	14	10
7	27	(Japan) Kaito Toba	Honda	18	+12.159	11	9
8	43	(Spain) Xavier Artigas	CFMoto	18	+12.467	15	8
9	6	(Japan) Ryusei Yamanaka	Gas Gas	18	+12.884	18	7
10	38	(Spain) David Salvador	KTM	18	+12.844	22	6
11	63	(Malaysia) Syarifuddin Azman	KTM	18	+14.033	20	5
12	18	(Italy) Matteo Bertelle	Honda	18	+20.736	12	4
13	55	(Italy) Romano Fenati	Honda	18	+26.304	24	3
14	80	(Colombia) David Alonso	Gas Gas	18	+27.524	7	2
15	70	(United Kingdom) Joshua Whatley	Honda	18	+37.275	28	1
16	44	(Spain) David Muñoz	KTM	18	+39.602	16	
17	92	(Spain) David Almansa	CFMoto	18	+41.959	25	
18	72	(Japan) Taiyo Furusato	Honda	18	+45.783	26	
19	48	(Spain) Iván Ortolá	KTM	18	+47.086	4	
20	7	(Italy) Filippo Farioli	KTM	18	+47.380	21	
21	22	(Spain) Ana Carrasco	KTM	18	+53.918	27	
22	95	(Netherlands) Collin Veijer	Husqvarna	18	+55.636	17	
23	99	(Spain) José Antonio Rueda	KTM	18	+56.852	13	
24	53	(Turkey) Deniz Öncü	KTM	18	+1:23.159	2	
Ret	54	(Italy) Riccardo Rossi	Honda	17	Accident	19	
Ret	5	(Spain) Jaume Masià	Honda	13	Accident	5	
Ret	64	(Indonesia) Mario Aji	Honda	13	Accident	23	
Ret	71	(Japan) Ayumu Sasaki	Husqvarna	10	Accident	1	
Fastest lap: (Spain) Jaume Masià (Honda) – 1:55.936 (lap 13)
OFFICIAL MOTO3 RACE REPORT

== Championship standings after the race ==
Below are the standings for the top five riders, constructors, and teams after the round.

=== MotoGP ===
Riders' Championship standings

	Pos.	Rider	Points
2	1	(Italy) Marco Bezzecchi	50
1	2	(Italy) Francesco Bagnaia	41
1	3	(France) Johann Zarco	35
2	4	(Spain) Álex Márquez	33
3	5	(Spain) Maverick Viñales	32

Constructors' Championship standings

	Pos.	Constructor	Points
	1	(Italy) Ducati	71
1	2	(Austria) KTM	38
1	3	(Italy) Aprilia	32
1	4	(Japan) Yamaha	27
1	5	(Japan) Honda	20

Teams' Championship standings

	Pos.	Team	Points
4	1	(Italy) Mooney VR46 Racing Team	65
2	2	(Italy) Prima Pramac Racing	57
	3	(Austria) Red Bull KTM Factory Racing	47
2	4	(Italy) Aprilia Racing	44
4	5	(Italy) Ducati Lenovo Team	41

=== Moto2 ===
Riders' Championship standings

	Pos.	Rider	Points
2	1	(Italy) Tony Arbolino	41
	2	(Spain) Arón Canet	33
2	3	(Spain) Pedro Acosta	29
2	4	(United Kingdom) Jake Dixon	26
1	5	(Czech Republic) Filip Salač	22

Constructors' Championship standings

Pos.	Constructor	Points
1	(Germany) Kalex	50
2	(Italy) Boscoscuro	23

Teams' Championship standings

	Pos.	Team	Points
1	1	(Belgium) Elf Marc VDS Racing Team	56
1	2	(Spain) Pons Wegow Los40	45
2	3	(Finland) Red Bull KTM Ajo	44
	4	(Italy) QJmotor Gresini Moto2	28
1	5	(Spain) Solunion GasGas Aspar Team	26

=== Moto3 ===
Riders' Championship standings

	Pos.	Rider	Points
	1	(Spain) Daniel Holgado	38
1	2	(Brazil) Diogo Moreira	36
11	3	(Japan) Tatsuki Suzuki	27
2	4	(Spain) David Muñoz	20
2	5	(Italy) Stefano Nepa	19

Constructors' Championship standings

	Pos.	Constructor	Points
	1	(Austria) KTM	45
	2	(Japan) Honda	36
1	3	(China) CFMoto	16
1	4	(Sweden) Husqvarna	10
	5	(Spain) Gas Gas	7

Teams' Championship standings

	Pos.	Team	Points
3	1	(Spain) MT Helmets – MSi	41
1	2	(France) Red Bull KTM Tech3	38
4	3	(Luxembourg) Leopard Racing	38
6	4	(France) CIP Green Power	25
	5	(Germany) CFMoto Racing Prüstel GP	23

Previous race: 2023 Portuguese Grand Prix	FIM Grand Prix World Championship; 2023 season	Next race: 2023 Grand Prix of the Americas
Previous race: 2022 Argentine Grand Prix	Argentine Republic motorcycle Grand Prix	Next race: 2025 Argentine Grand Prix
