= 2023 Motorcycle Grand Prix of the Americas =

Motorcycle races in Austin

(United States) 2023 Grand Prix of the Americas
Race details
- Race 3 of 20 races in the 2023 Grand Prix motorcycle racing season
- Date: April 16, 2023
- Official name: Red Bull Grand Prix of the Americas
- Location: Circuit of the Americas; Austin, Texas, United States
- Course: Permanent racing facility; 5.513 km (3.426 mi)

MotoGP
Pole position
Rider	(Italy) Francesco Bagnaia	Ducati
Time	2:01.892	
Fastest lap
Rider	(Spain) Álex Rins	Honda
Time	2:03.126 on lap 4	
Podium
First	(Spain) Álex Rins	Honda
Second	(Italy) Luca Marini	Ducati
Third	(France) Fabio Quartararo	Yamaha

Moto2
Pole position
Rider	(Italy) Celestino Vietti	Kalex
Time	2:09.432	
Fastest lap
Rider	(Spain) Jeremy Alcoba	Kalex
Time	2:09.465 on lap 6	
Podium
First	(Spain) Pedro Acosta	Kalex
Second	(Italy) Tony Arbolino	Kalex
Third	(Netherlands) Bo Bendsneyder	Kalex

Moto3
Pole position
Rider	(Spain) Jaume Masià	Honda
Time	2:16.250	
Fastest lap
Rider	(Spain) Iván Ortolá	KTM
Time	2:16.356 on lap 7	
Podium
First	(Spain) Iván Ortolá	KTM
Second	(Spain) Jaume Masià	Honda
Third	(Spain) Xavier Artigas	CFMoto

The 2023 Motorcycle Grand Prix of the Americas (officially known as the Red Bull Grand Prix of the Americas) was the third round of the 2023 Grand Prix motorcycle racing season. It was held at the Circuit of the Americas in Austin, Texas on April 16, 2023.

== Background ==
=== MotoGP Championship standings before the race ===
After starting off the season with a third place finish at Portuguese GP, Marco Bezzecchi came in second for the sprint race and won the Grand Prix race at the Argentina GP. This gave him a 9 point lead over his compatriot Francesco Bagnaia and a lead in the MotoGP standings with Bezzecchi having 50 points.

== Qualifying ==
=== MotoGP ===
Fastest session lap

Pos.	No.	Biker	Constructor	Qualifying times		Final grid	Row
Pos.	No.	Biker	Constructor	Q1	Q2	Final grid	Row
1	1	(Italy) Francesco Bagnaia	Ducati	Qualified in Q2	2:01.892	1	1
2	42	(Spain) Álex Rins	Honda	Qualified in Q2	2:02.052	2	1
3	10	(Italy) Luca Marini	Ducati	Qualified in Q2	2:02.181	3	1
4	73	(Spain) Álex Márquez	Ducati	Qualified in Q2	2:02.242	4	2
5	72	(Italy) Marco Bezzecchi	Ducati	2'02.523	2:02.268	5	2
6	41	(Spain) Aleix Espargaró	Aprilia	Qualified in Q2	2:02.539	6	2
7	20	(France) Fabio Quartararo	Yamaha	Qualified in Q2	2'02.749	7	3
8	12	(Spain) Maverick Viñales	Aprilia	Qualified in Q2	2:02.882	8	3
9	5	(France) Johann Zarco	Ducati	2:02.387	2:03.062	9	3
10	43	(Australia) Jack Miller	KTM	Qualified in Q2	2'03.084	10	4
11	33	(South Africa) Brad Binder	KTM	Qualified in Q2	2:03.107	11	4
12	89	(Spain) Jorge Martín	Ducati	Qualified in Q2	2:03.292	12	4
13	36	(Spain) Joan Mir	Honda	2:02.743	N/A	13	5
14	21	(Italy) Franco Morbidelli	Yamaha	2:02.950	N/A	14	5
15	88	(Portugal) Miguel Oliveira	Aprilia	2:03.065	N/A	15	5
16	49	(Italy) Fabio Di Giannantonio	Ducati	2:03.350	N/A	16	6
17	30	(Japan) Takaaki Nakagami	Honda	2:03.403	N/A	17	6
18	51	(Italy) Michele Pirro	Ducati	2'03.452	N/A	18	6
19	25	(Spain) Raúl Fernández	Aprilia	2:03.527	N/A	19	7
20	37	(Spain) Augusto Fernández	KTM	2:03.798	N/A	20	7
21	6	(Germany) Stefan Bradl	Honda	2:03.907	N/A	21	7
22	94	(Germany) Jonas Folger	KTM	2'07.597	N/A	21	8
OFFICIAL MOTOGP QUALIFYING RESULTS

== MotoGP Sprint ==
The MotoGP Sprint was held on April 15.

Pos.	No.	Rider	Team	Manufacturer	Laps	Time/Retired	Grid	Points
1	1	(Italy) Francesco Bagnaia	Ducati Lenovo Team	Ducati	10	20:35.270	1	12
2	42	(Spain) Álex Rins	LCR Honda Castrol	Honda	10	+2.545	2	9
3	89	(Spain) Jorge Martín	Prima Pramac Racing	Ducati	10	+4.706	12	7
4	41	(Spain) Aleix Espargaró	Aprilia Racing	Aprilia	10	+5.052	6	6
5	33	(South Africa) Brad Binder	Red Bull KTM Factory Racing	KTM	10	+8.175	11	5
6	72	(Italy) Marco Bezzecchi	Mooney VR46 Racing Team	Ducati	10	+8.877	5	4
7	10	(Italy) Luca Marini	Mooney VR46 Racing Team	Ducati	10	+9.453	3	3
8	88	(Portugal) Miguel Oliveira	CryptoData RNF MotoGP Team	Aprilia	10	+10.768	15	2
9	43	(Australia) Jack Miller	Red Bull KTM Factory Racing	KTM	10	+12.448	10	1
10	12	(Spain) Maverick Viñales	Aprilia Racing	Aprilia	10	+12.739	8	
11	5	(France) Johann Zarco	Prima Pramac Racing	Ducati	10	+14.251	9	
12	36	(Spain) Joan Mir	Repsol Honda Team	Honda	10	+14.988	13	
13	30	(Japan) Takaaki Nakagami	LCR Honda Idemitsu	Honda	10	+15.592	17	
14	21	(Italy) Franco Morbidelli	Monster Energy Yamaha MotoGP	Yamaha	10	+16.534	14	
15	25	(Spain) Raúl Fernández	CryptoData RNF MotoGP Team	Aprilia	10	+19.290	19	
16	37	(Spain) Augusto Fernández	GasGas Factory Racing Tech3	KTM	10	+23.128	20	
17	49	(Italy) Fabio Di Giannantonio	Gresini Racing MotoGP	Ducati	10	+25.626	16	
18	6	(Germany) Stefan Bradl	Repsol Honda Team	Honda	10	+25.787	21	
19	20	(France) Fabio Quartararo	Monster Energy Yamaha MotoGP	Yamaha	10	+27.169	7	
20	94	(Germany) Jonas Folger	GasGas Factory Racing Tech3	KTM	10	+46.973	22	
Ret	73	(Spain) Álex Márquez	Gresini Racing MotoGP	Ducati	6	Accident	4	
Ret	51	(Italy) Michele Pirro	Ducati Lenovo Team	Ducati	5	Retired	18	
Fastest sprint lap: (Italy) Francesco Bagnaia (Ducati) – 2:03.082 (lap 5)
OFFICIAL MOTOGP SPRINT REPORT

== Race ==
=== MotoGP ===
Pos.	No.	Rider	Team	Manufacturer	Laps	Time/Retired	Grid	Points
1	42	(Spain) Álex Rins	LCR Honda Castrol	Honda	20	41:14.649	2	25
2	10	(Italy) Luca Marini	Mooney VR46 Racing Team	Ducati	20	+3.498	3	20
3	20	(France) Fabio Quartararo	Monster Energy Yamaha MotoGP	Yamaha	20	+4.936	7	16
4	12	(Spain) Maverick Viñales	Aprilia Racing	Aprilia	20	+8.318	8	13
5	88	(Portugal) Miguel Oliveira	CryptoData RNF MotoGP Team	Aprilia	20	+9.989	15	11
6	72	(Italy) Marco Bezzecchi	Mooney VR46 Racing Team	Ducati	20	+12.049	5	10
7	5	(France) Johann Zarco	Prima Pramac Racing	Ducati	20	+12.242	9	9
8	21	(Italy) Franco Morbidelli	Monster Energy Yamaha MotoGP	Yamaha	20	+20.399	14	8
9	49	(Italy) Fabio Di Giannantonio	Gresini Racing MotoGP	Ducati	20	+27.981	16	7
10	37	(Spain) Augusto Fernández	GasGas Factory Racing Tech3	KTM	20	+28.217	20	6
11	51	(Italy) Michele Pirro	Ducati Lenovo Team	Ducati	20	+32.370	18	5
12	94	(Germany) Jonas Folger	GasGas Factory Racing Tech3	KTM	20	+1:08.065	22	4
13	33	(South Africa) Brad Binder	Red Bull KTM Factory Racing	KTM	20	+1:23.012	11	3
Ret	6	(Germany) Stefan Bradl	Repsol Honda Team	Honda	18	Accident	21	
Ret	30	(Japan) Takaaki Nakagami	LCR Honda Idemitsu	Honda	11	Accident	17	
Ret	36	(Spain) Joan Mir	Repsol Honda Team	Honda	8	Accident	13	
Ret	1	(Italy) Francesco Bagnaia	Ducati Lenovo Team	Ducati	7	Accident	1	
Ret	43	(Australia) Jack Miller	Red Bull KTM Factory Racing	KTM	6	Accident	10	
Ret	25	(Spain) Raúl Fernández	CryptoData RNF MotoGP Team	Aprilia	6	Ride-Height Device	19	
Ret	73	(Spain) Álex Márquez	Gresini Racing MotoGP	Ducati	0	Collision	4	
Ret	41	(Spain) Aleix Espargaró	Aprilia Racing	Aprilia	0	Accident	6	
Ret	89	(Spain) Jorge Martín	Prima Pramac Racing	Ducati	0	Collision	12	
Fastest lap: (Spain) Álex Rins (Honda) – 2:03.126 (lap 4)
OFFICIAL MOTOGP RACE REPORT

=== Moto2 ===
Pos.	No.	Biker	Constructor	Laps	Time/Retired	Grid	Points
1	37	(Spain) Pedro Acosta	Kalex	16	34:42.879	2	25
2	14	(Italy) Tony Arbolino	Kalex	16	+0.146	8	20
3	64	(Netherlands) Bo Bendsneyder	Kalex	16	+5.851	4	16
4	52	(Spain) Jeremy Alcoba	Kalex	16	+6.049	10	13
5	12	(Czech Republic) Filip Salač	Kalex	16	+7.462	3	11
6	54	(Spain) Fermín Aldeguer	Boscoscuro	16	+7.668	11	10
7	21	(Spain) Alonso López	Boscoscuro	16	+7.715	5	9
8	40	(Spain) Arón Canet	Kalex	16	+8.078	7	8
9	13	(Italy) Celestino Vietti	Kalex	16	+11.114	1	7
10	18	(Spain) Manuel González	Kalex	16	+12.561	9	6
11	35	(Thailand) Somkiat Chantra	Kalex	16	+13.607	15	5
12	75	(Spain) Albert Arenas	Kalex	16	+14.001	13	4
13	22	(United Kingdom) Sam Lowes	Kalex	16	+20.054	18	3
14	71	(Italy) Dennis Foggia	Kalex	16	+22.990	14	2
15	79	(Japan) Ai Ogura	Kalex	16	+28.820	16	1
16	16	(United States) Joe Roberts	Kalex	16	+31.893	17	
17	84	(Netherlands) Zonta van den Goorbergh	Kalex	16	+34.734	21	
18	4	(United States) Sean Dylan Kelly	Kalex	16	+34.934	22	
19	33	(United Kingdom) Rory Skinner	Kalex	16	+42.540	24	
20	72	(Spain) Borja Gómez	Kalex	16	+49.973	26	
21	28	(Spain) Izan Guevara	Kalex	16	+51.470	27	
22	98	(Spain) David Sanchis	Forward	16	+1:05.224	28	
23	2	(Japan) Soichiro Minamimoto	Kalex	16	+1:44.447	29	
Ret	11	(Spain) Sergio García	Kalex	9	Retired	20	
Ret	24	(Spain) Marcos Ramírez	Forward	8	Throttle	25	
Ret	7	(Belgium) Barry Baltus	Kalex	7	Accident	12	
Ret	19	(Italy) Lorenzo Dalla Porta	Kalex	3	Accident	19	
Ret	3	(Germany) Lukas Tulovic	Kalex	0	Accident	23	
DNS	96	(United Kingdom) Jake Dixon	Kalex		Did not start	6	
DNS	15	(South Africa) Darryn Binder	Kalex		Did not start		
Fastest lap: (Spain) Jeremy Alcoba (Kalex) – 2:09.465 (lap 6)
OFFICIAL MOTO2 RACE REPORT

- Jake Dixon crashed on the warm up lap and was unable to start.
- Darryn Binder withdrew from the race after suffering a fractured right hand during practice 3.

=== Moto3 ===
Pos.	No.	Biker	Constructor	Laps	Time/Retired	Grid	Points
1	48	(Spain) Iván Ortolá	KTM	14	32:01.062	3	25
2	5	(Spain) Jaume Masià	Honda	14	+0.457	1	20
3	43	(Spain) Xavier Artigas	CFMoto	14	+0.558	9	16
4	10	(Brazil) Diogo Moreira	KTM	14	+0.567	4	13
5	96	(Spain) Daniel Holgado	KTM	14	+0.657	5	11
6	53	(Turkey) Deniz Öncü	KTM	14	+9.493	14	10
7	38	(Spain) David Salvador	KTM	14	+9.547	12	9
8	80	(Colombia) David Alonso	Gas Gas	14	+9.663	22	8
9	6	(Japan) Ryusei Yamanaka	Gas Gas	14	+9.975	7	7
10	99	(Spain) José Antonio Rueda	KTM	14	+10.085	11	6
11	27	(Japan) Kaito Toba	Honda	14	+12.430	15	5
12	64	(Indonesia) Mario Aji	Honda	14	+15.789	25	4
13	95	(Netherlands) Collin Veijer	Husqvarna	14	+15.967	21	3
14	19	(United Kingdom) Scott Ogden	Honda	14	+16.179	23	2
15	54	(Italy) Riccardo Rossi	Honda	14	+16.214	17	1
16	55	(Italy) Romano Fenati	Honda	14	+23.833	13	
17	92	(Spain) David Almansa	CFMoto	14	+24.204	28	
18	7	(Italy) Filippo Farioli	KTM	14	+24.401	20	
19	16	(Italy) Andrea Migno	KTM	14	+24.676	24	
20	72	(Japan) Taiyo Furusato	Honda	14	+24.913	19	
21	22	(Spain) Ana Carrasco	KTM	14	+35.940	26	
Ret	44	(Spain) David Muñoz	KTM	13	Accident	16	
Ret	82	(Italy) Stefano Nepa	KTM	13	Accident	6	
Ret	71	(Japan) Ayumu Sasaki	Husqvarna	12	Accident Damage	2	
Ret	18	(Italy) Matteo Bertelle	Honda	6	Accident	8	
Ret	63	(Malaysia) Syarifuddin Azman	KTM	5	Accident	18	
Ret	24	(Japan) Tatsuki Suzuki	Honda	4	Accident	10	
DNS	70	(United Kingdom) Joshua Whatley	Honda		Did not start	27	
Fastest lap: (Spain) Iván Ortolá (KTM) – 2:16.356 (lap 7)
OFFICIAL MOTO3 RACE REPORT

- Joshua Whatley crashed on the warm up lap and was unable to start.

== Championship standings after the race ==
Below are the standings for the top five riders, constructors, and teams after the round.

=== MotoGP ===
Riders' Championship standings

	Pos.	Rider	Points
	1	(Italy) Marco Bezzecchi	64
	2	(Italy) Francesco Bagnaia	53
9	3	(Spain) Álex Rins	47
1	4	(Spain) Maverick Viñales	45
2	5	(France) Johann Zarco	44

Constructors' Championship standings

	Pos.	Constructor	Points
	1	(Italy) Ducati	103
3	2	(Japan) Honda	54
	3	(Italy) Aprilia	51
2	4	(Austria) KTM	49
1	5	(Japan) Yamaha	43

Teams' Championship standings

	Pos.	Team	Points
	1	(Italy) Mooney VR46 Racing Team	102
	2	(Italy) Prima Pramac Racing	73
1	3	(Italy) Aprilia Racing	63
3	4	(Japan) Monster Energy Yamaha MotoGP	63
	5	(Italy) Ducati Lenovo Team	58

=== Moto2 ===
Riders' Championship standings

	Pos.	Rider	Points
	1	(Italy) Tony Arbolino	61
1	2	(Spain) Pedro Acosta	54
1	3	(Spain) Arón Canet	41
1	4	(Czech Republic) Filip Salač	33
1	5	(Spain) Alonso López	29

Constructors' Championship standings

Pos.	Constructor	Points
1	(Germany) Kalex	75
2	(Italy) Boscoscuro	33

Teams' Championship standings

	Pos.	Team	Points
	1	(Belgium) Elf Marc VDS Racing Team	79
1	2	(Finland) Red Bull KTM Ajo	73
1	3	(Spain) Pons Wegow Los40	53
	4	(Italy) QJmotor Gresini Moto2	52
1	5	(Italy) Beta Tools Speed Up	43

=== Moto3 ===
Riders' Championship standings

	Pos.	Rider	Points
	1	(Spain) Daniel Holgado	49
	2	(Brazil) Diogo Moreira	49
4	3	(Spain) Xavier Artigas	32
6	4	(Spain) Jaume Masià	31
2	5	(Japan) Tatsuki Suzuki	27

Constructors' Championship standings

	Pos.	Constructor	Points
	1	(Austria) KTM	70
	2	(Japan) Honda	56
	3	(China) CFMoto	32
1	4	(Spain) Gas Gas	15
1	5	(Sweden) Husqvarna	13

Teams' Championship standings

	Pos.	Team	Points
2	1	(Luxembourg) Leopard Racing	58
1	2	(Spain) MT Helmets – MSi	54
1	3	(France) Red Bull KTM Tech3	49
4	4	(Italy) Angeluss MTA Team	44
	5	(Germany) CFMoto Racing Prüstel GP	39

Previous race: 2023 Argentine Grand Prix	FIM Grand Prix World Championship; 2023 season	Next race: 2023 Spanish Grand Prix
Previous race: 2022 Grand Prix of the Americas	Motorcycle Grand Prix of the Americas	Next race: 2024 Grand Prix of the Americas
