= 2023 Malaysian motorcycle Grand Prix =

Motorcycle races in Sepang

(Malaysia) 2023 Malaysian Grand Prix
Race details
- Race 18 of 20 races in the 2023 Grand Prix motorcycle racing season
- Date: 12 November 2023
- Official name: Petronas Grand Prix of Malaysia
- Location: Petronas Sepang International Circuit; Sepang, Selangor, Malaysia
- Course: Permanent racing facility; 5.543 km (3.444 mi)

MotoGP
Pole position
| Rider | (Italy) Francesco Bagnaia | Ducati |
| Time | 1:57.491 | |
Fastest lap
| Rider | (Spain) Álex Márquez | Ducati |
| Time | 1:58.979 on lap 3 | |
Podium
| First | (Italy) Enea Bastianini | Ducati |
| Second | (Spain) Álex Márquez | Ducati |
| Third | (Italy) Francesco Bagnaia | Ducati |

Moto2
Pole position
| Rider | (Spain) Fermín Aldeguer | Boscoscuro |
| Time | 2:05.288 | |
Fastest lap
| Rider | (Spain) Fermín Aldeguer | Boscoscuro |
| Time | 2:06.151 on lap 3 | |
Podium
| First | (Spain) Fermín Aldeguer | Boscoscuro |
| Second | (Spain) Pedro Acosta | Kalex |
| Third | (Spain) Marcos Ramírez | Kalex |

Moto3
Pole position
| Rider | (Spain) Jaume Masià | Honda |
| Time | 2:10.846 | |
Fastest lap
| Rider | (Japan) Ayumu Sasaki | Husqvarna |
| Time | 2:12.268 on lap 2 | |
Podium
| First | (Netherlands) Collin Veijer | Husqvarna |
| Second | (Japan) Ayumu Sasaki | Husqvarna |
| Third | (Spain) Jaume Masià | Honda |

The 2023 Malaysian motorcycle Grand Prix (officially known as the Petronas Grand Prix of Malaysia) was the eighteenth round of the 2023 Grand Prix motorcycle racing season. It was held at the Petronas Sepang International Circuit in Sepang on 12 November 2023.

In the Moto2 class, Pedro Acosta secured the Riders' Championship after finishing second place, with closest title rival Tony Arbolino finishing tenth. Acosta became the youngest Moto2 champion, at the age of 19 years, 171 days, and only behind Dani Pedrosa (19 years, 18 days) as the youngest intermediate class champion.

In the Moto3 class, KTM secured its sixth Constructors' Championship.

== Background ==
=== Championship standings before the race ===
==== MotoGP ====
Going into the race weekend, Francesco Bagnaia led the Riders' Championship with 389 points, 13 clear of Jorge Martín. Marco Bezzecchi was in third place, another 66 points adrift. In the Constructors' standings, Ducati, having secured their 5th title at the Indonesian Grand Prix, was in front with 589 points, with KTM and Aprilia second and third with 321 and 287 points, respectively.

== Practice session ==
=== MotoGP ===
==== Practice ====
The top ten riders (written in bold) qualified for Q2.

| Pos. | No. | Biker | Constructor | |
| Pos. | No. | Biker | Constructor | Time results |
|---|---|---|---|---|
| 1 | 73 | **(Spain) Álex Márquez** | **Ducati** | **1:57.823** |
| 2 | 89 | **(Spain) Jorge Martín** | **Ducati** | **1:57.997** |
| 3 | 43 | **(Australia) Jack Miller** | **KTM** | **1:58.232** |
| 4 | 33 | **(South Africa) Brad Binder** | **KTM** | **1:58.307** |
| 5 | 12 | **(Spain) Maverick Viñales** | **Aprilia** | **1:58.312** |
| 6 | 10 | **(Italy) Luca Marini** | **Ducati** | **1:58.334** |
| 7 | 20 | **(France) Fabio Quartararo** | **Yamaha** | **1:58.399** |
| 8 | 1 | **(Italy) Francesco Bagnaia** | **Ducati** | **1:58.420** |
| 9 | 72 | **(Italy) Marco Bezzecchi** | **Ducati** | **1:58.450** |
| 10 | 5 | **(France) Johann Zarco** | **Ducati** | **1:58.487** |
| 11 | 21 | (Italy) Franco Morbidelli | Yamaha | 1:58.571 |
| 12 | 23 | (Italy) Enea Bastianini | Ducati | 1:58.605 |
| 13 | 37 | (Spain) Augusto Fernández | KTM | 1:58.678 |
| 14 | 49 | (Italy) Fabio Di Giannantonio | Ducati | 1:58.709 |
| 15 | 93 | (Spain) Marc Márquez | Honda | 1:58.788 |
| 16 | 36 | (Spain) Joan Mir | Honda | 1:58.902 |
| 17 | 44 | (Spain) Pol Espargaró | KTM | 1:58.974 |
| 18 | 25 | (Spain) Raúl Fernández | Aprilia | 1:59.024 |
| 19 | 88 | (Portugal) Miguel Oliveira | Aprilia | 1:59.150 |
| 20 | 41 | (Spain) Aleix Espargaró | Aprilia | 1:59.726 |
| 21 | 30 | (Japan) Takaaki Nakagami | Honda | 1:59.755 |
| 22 | 19 | (Spain) Álvaro Bautista | Ducati | 2:00.370 |
| 23 | 27 | (Spain) Iker Lecuona | Honda | 2:00.451 |
OFFICIAL MOTOGP PRACTICE TIMES REPORT

== Qualifying ==
=== MotoGP ===
Fastest session lap

| Pos. | No. | Biker | Constructor | Qualifying times | | Final grid | Row |
| Pos. | No. | Biker | Constructor | Q1 | Q2 | Final grid | Row |
|---|---|---|---|---|---|---|---|
| 1 | 1 | (Italy) Francesco Bagnaia | Ducati | Qualified in Q2 | 1:57.491 | 1 | 1 |
| 2 | 89 | (Spain) Jorge Martín | Ducati | Qualified in Q2 | 1:57.549 | 2 | 1 |
| 3 | 23 | (Italy) Enea Bastianini | Ducati | 1:57.911 | 1:57.590 | 3 | 1 |
| 4 | 73 | (Spain) Álex Márquez | Ducati | Qualified in Q2 | 1:57.661 | 4 | 2 |
| 5 | 10 | (Italy) Luca Marini | Ducati | Qualified in Q2 | 1:57.787 | 5 | 2 |
| 6 | 72 | (Italy) Marco Bezzecchi | Ducati | Qualified in Q2 | 1:57.805 | 6 | 2 |
| 7 | 33 | (South Africa) Brad Binder | KTM | Qualified in Q2 | 1:58.050 | 7 | 3 |
| 8 | 20 | (France) Fabio Quartararo | Yamaha | Qualified in Q2 | 1:58.080 | 8 | 3 |
| 9 | 12 | (Spain) Maverick Viñales | Aprilia | Qualified in Q2 | 1:58.253 | 9 | 3 |
| 10 | 43 | (Australia) Jack Miller | KTM | Qualified in Q2 | 1:58.468 | 10 | 4 |
| 11 | 49 | (Italy) Fabio Di Giannantonio | Ducati | 1:57.823 | 1:59.211 | 11 | 4 |
| 12 | 5 | (France) Johann Zarco | Ducati | Qualified in Q2 | 2:01.848 | 12 | 4 |
| 13 | 41 | (Spain) Aleix Espargaró | Aprilia | 1:58.069 | N/A | 13 | 5 |
| 14 | 37 | (Spain) Augusto Fernández | KTM | 1:58.107 | N/A | 14 | 5 |
| 15 | 21 | (Italy) Franco Morbidelli | Yamaha | 1:58.321 | N/A | 15 | 5 |
| 16 | 36 | (Spain) Joan Mir | Honda | 1:58.440 | N/A | 16 | 6 |
| 17 | 44 | (Spain) Pol Espargaró | KTM | 1:58.555 | N/A | 17 | 6 |
| 18 | 25 | (Spain) Raúl Fernández | Aprilia | 1:58.623 | N/A | 18 | 6 |
| 19 | 88 | (Portugal) Miguel Oliveira | Aprilia | 1:58.638 | N/A | 19 | 7 |
| 20 | 93 | (Spain) Marc Márquez | Honda | 1:58.717 | N/A | 20 | 7 |
| 21 | 30 | (Japan) Takaaki Nakagami | Honda | 1:58.886 | N/A | 21 | 7 |
| 22 | 19 | (Spain) Álvaro Bautista | Ducati | 1:59.418 | N/A | 22 | 8 |
| 23 | 27 | (Spain) Iker Lecuona | Honda | 1:59.658 | N/A | 23 | 8 |
OFFICIAL MOTOGP QUALIFYING RESULTS

== MotoGP Sprint ==
The MotoGP Sprint was held on 11 November.

| Pos. | No. | Rider | Team | Constructor | Laps | Time/Retired | Grid | Points |
|---|---|---|---|---|---|---|---|---|
| 1 | 73 | (Spain) Álex Márquez | Gresini Racing MotoGP | Ducati | 10 | 19:58.713 | 4 | 12 |
| 2 | 89 | (Spain) Jorge Martín | Prima Pramac Racing | Ducati | 10 | +1.589 | 2 | 9 |
| 3 | 1 | (Italy) Francesco Bagnaia | Ducati Lenovo Team | Ducati | 10 | +3.034 | 1 | 7 |
| 4 | 23 | (Italy) Enea Bastianini | Ducati Lenovo Team | Ducati | 10 | +3.242 | 3 | 6 |
| 5 | 33 | (South Africa) Brad Binder | Red Bull KTM Factory Racing | KTM | 10 | +3.310 | 7 | 5 |
| 6 | 43 | (Australia) Jack Miller | Red Bull KTM Factory Racing | KTM | 10 | +4.318 | 10 | 4 |
| 7 | 72 | (Italy) Marco Bezzecchi | Mooney VR46 Racing Team | Ducati | 10 | +5.307 | 6 | 3 |
| 8 | 5 | (France) Johann Zarco | Prima Pramac Racing | Ducati | 10 | +5.501 | 12 | 2 |
| 9 | 10 | (Italy) Luca Marini | Mooney VR46 Racing Team | Ducati | 10 | +6.420 | 5 | 1 |
| 10 | 12 | (Spain) Maverick Viñales | Aprilia Racing | Aprilia | 10 | +7.241 | 9 | |
| 11 | 21 | (Italy) Franco Morbidelli | Monster Energy Yamaha MotoGP | Yamaha | 10 | +8.775 | 15 | |
| 12 | 41 | (Spain) Aleix Espargaró | Aprilia Racing | Aprilia | 10 | +9.995 | 13 | |
| 13 | 49 | (Italy) Fabio Di Giannantonio | Gresini Racing MotoGP | Ducati | 10 | +10.067 | 11 | |
| 14 | 37 | (Spain) Augusto Fernández | GasGas Factory Racing Tech3 | KTM | 10 | +10.643 | 14 | |
| 15 | 44 | (Spain) Pol Espargaró | GasGas Factory Racing Tech3 | KTM | 10 | +11.005 | 17 | |
| 16 | 20 | (France) Fabio Quartararo | Monster Energy Yamaha MotoGP | Yamaha | 10 | +11.911 | 8 | |
| 17 | 25 | (Spain) Raúl Fernández | CryptoData RNF MotoGP Team | Aprilia | 10 | +13.591 | 18 | |
| 18 | 88 | (Portugal) Miguel Oliveira | CryptoData RNF MotoGP Team | Aprilia | 10 | +15.058 | 19 | |
| 19 | 30 | (Japan) Takaaki Nakagami | LCR Honda Idemitsu | Honda | 10 | +16.015 | 21 | |
| 20 | 27 | (Spain) Iker Lecuona | LCR Honda Castrol | Honda | 10 | +23.484 | 23 | |
| 21 | 93 | (Spain) Marc Márquez | Repsol Honda Team | Honda | 10 | +24.930 | 20 | |
| 22 | 19 | (Spain) Álvaro Bautista | Aruba.it Racing | Ducati | 10 | +36.501 | 22 | |
| 23 | 36 | (Spain) Joan Mir | Repsol Honda Team | Honda | 10 | +40.594 | 16 | |
Fastest sprint lap: (Italy) Enea Bastianini (Ducati) – 1:58.996 (lap 5)
OFFICIAL MOTOGP SPRINT REPORT

== Warm up practice ==
=== MotoGP ===
Fabio Quartararo set the best time 1:59.218 and was the fastest rider at this session ahead of Brad Binder and Enea Bastianini.

== Race ==
=== MotoGP ===
| Pos. | No. | Rider | Team | Constructor | Laps | Time/Retired | Grid | Points |
|---|---|---|---|---|---|---|---|---|
| 1 | 23 | (Italy) Enea Bastianini | Ducati Lenovo Team | Ducati | 20 | 39:59.137 | 3 | 25 |
| 2 | 73 | (Spain) Álex Márquez | Gresini Racing MotoGP | Ducati | 20 | +1.535 | 4 | 20 |
| 3 | 1 | (Italy) Francesco Bagnaia | Ducati Lenovo Team | Ducati | 20 | +3.562 | 1 | 16 |
| 4 | 89 | (Spain) Jorge Martín | Prima Pramac Racing | Ducati | 20 | +10.526 | 2 | 13 |
| 5 | 20 | (France) Fabio Quartararo | Monster Energy Yamaha MotoGP | Yamaha | 20 | +15.000 | 8 | 11 |
| 6 | 72 | (Italy) Marco Bezzecchi | Mooney VR46 Racing Team | Ducati | 20 | +16.946 | 6 | 10 |
| 7 | 21 | (Italy) Franco Morbidelli | Monster Energy Yamaha MotoGP | Yamaha | 20 | +18.553 | 15 | 9 |
| 8 | 43 | (Australia) Jack Miller | Red Bull KTM Factory Racing | KTM | 20 | +19.204 | 10 | 8 |
| 9 | 49 | (Italy) Fabio Di Giannantonio | Gresini Racing MotoGP | Ducati | 20 | +19.399 | 11 | 7 |
| 10 | 10 | (Italy) Luca Marini | Mooney VR46 Racing Team | Ducati | 20 | +19.740 | 5 | 6 |
| 11 | 12 | (Spain) Maverick Viñales | Aprilia Racing | Aprilia | 20 | +21.189 | 9 | 5 |
| 12 | 5 | (France) Johann Zarco | Prima Pramac Racing | Ducati | 20 | +23.598 | 12 | 4 |
| 13 | 93 | (Spain) Marc Márquez | Repsol Honda Team | Honda | 20 | +27.079 | 20 | 3 |
| 14 | 37 | (Spain) Augusto Fernández | GasGas Factory Racing Tech3 | KTM | 20 | +28.940 | 14 | 2 |
| 15 | 44 | (Spain) Pol Espargaró | GasGas Factory Racing Tech3 | KTM | 20 | +29.849 | 17 | 1 |
| 16 | 27 | (Spain) Iker Lecuona | LCR Honda Castrol | Honda | 20 | +50.960 | 23 | |
| 17 | 19 | (Spain) Álvaro Bautista | Aruba.it Racing | Ducati | 20 | +53.564 | 22 | |
| 18 | 30 | (Japan) Takaaki Nakagami | LCR Honda Idemitsu | Honda | 20 | +1:42.162 | 21 | |
| Ret | 33 | (South Africa) Brad Binder | Red Bull KTM Factory Racing | KTM | 11 | Accident | 7 | |
| Ret | 41 | (Spain) Aleix Espargaró | Aprilia Racing | Aprilia | 8 | Accident | 13 | |
| Ret | 25 | (Spain) Raúl Fernández | CryptoData RNF MotoGP Team | Aprilia | 6 | Technical issue | 18 | |
| Ret | 88 | (Portugal) Miguel Oliveira | CryptoData RNF MotoGP Team | Aprilia | 5 | Accident | 19 | |
| Ret | 36 | (Spain) Joan Mir | Repsol Honda Team | Honda | 4 | Accident | 16 | |
Fastest lap: (Spain) Álex Márquez (Ducati) – 1:58.979 (lap 3)
OFFICIAL MOTOGP RACE REPORT

=== Moto2 ===
| Pos. | No. | Rider | Constructor | Laps | Time/Retired | Grid | Points |
|---|---|---|---|---|---|---|---|
| 1 | 54 | (Spain) Fermín Aldeguer | Boscoscuro | 17 | 36:04.378 | 1 | 25 |
| 2 | 37 | (Spain) Pedro Acosta | Kalex | 17 | +7.128 | 6 | 20 |
| 3 | 24 | (Spain) Marcos Ramírez | Kalex | 17 | +9.558 | 5 | 16 |
| 4 | 79 | (Japan) Ai Ogura | Kalex | 17 | +9.992 | 13 | 13 |
| 5 | 96 | (United Kingdom) Jake Dixon | Kalex | 17 | +11.652 | 8 | 11 |
| 6 | 35 | (Thailand) Somkiat Chantra | Kalex | 17 | +13.675 | 9 | 10 |
| 7 | 22 | (United Kingdom) Sam Lowes | Kalex | 17 | +15.200 | 11 | 9 |
| 8 | 16 | (United States) Joe Roberts | Kalex | 17 | +18.482 | 10 | 8 |
| 9 | 75 | (Spain) Albert Arenas | Kalex | 17 | +20.004 | 16 | 7 |
| 10 | 14 | (Italy) Tony Arbolino | Kalex | 17 | +20.990 | 7 | 6 |
| 11 | 7 | (Belgium) Barry Baltus | Kalex | 17 | +21.570 | 14 | 5 |
| 12 | 52 | (Spain) Jeremy Alcoba | Kalex | 17 | +23.489 | 21 | 4 |
| 13 | 17 | (Spain) Álex Escrig | Forward | 17 | +25.791 | 23 | 3 |
| 14 | 12 | (Czech Republic) Filip Salač | Kalex | 17 | +29.853 | 18 | 2 |
| 15 | 71 | (Italy) Dennis Foggia | Kalex | 17 | +29.923 | 19 | 1 |
| 16 | 23 | (Japan) Taiga Hada | Kalex | 17 | +32.681 | 17 | |
| 17 | 64 | (Netherlands) Bo Bendsneyder | Kalex | 17 | +33.361 | 22 | |
| 18 | 84 | (Netherlands) Zonta van den Goorbergh | Kalex | 17 | +38.800 | 20 | |
| 19 | 4 | (United States) Sean Dylan Kelly | Forward | 17 | +41.799 | 27 | |
| 20 | 33 | (United Kingdom) Rory Skinner | Kalex | 17 | +44.758 | 26 | |
| 21 | 9 | (Italy) Mattia Casadei | Kalex | 17 | +53.217 | 30 | |
| 22 | 21 | (Spain) Alonso López | Boscoscuro | 17 | +58.554 | 15 | |
| 23 | 32 | (Malaysia) Helmi Azman | Kalex | 17 | +1:09.940 | 31 | |
| 24 | 3 | (Germany) Lukas Tulovic | Kalex | 17 | +1:20.633 | 24 | |
| 25 | 11 | (Spain) Sergio García | Kalex | 16 | +1 lap | 12 | |
| Ret | 20 | (Malaysia) Azroy Anuar | Kalex | 8 | Accident | 29 | |
| Ret | 13 | (Italy) Celestino Vietti | Kalex | 8 | Accident damage | 2 | |
| Ret | 40 | (Spain) Arón Canet | Kalex | 5 | Accident | 4 | |
| Ret | 18 | (Spain) Manuel González | Kalex | 5 | Accident damage | 3 | |
| Ret | 5 | (Japan) Kohta Nozane | Kalex | 4 | Accident | 28 | |
| Ret | 28 | (Spain) Izan Guevara | Kalex | 2 | Accident | 25 | |
| DNS | 15 | (South Africa) Darryn Binder | Kalex | | Did not start | 32 | |
Fastest lap: (Spain) Fermín Aldeguer (Boscoscuro) – 2:06.151 (lap 3)
OFFICIAL MOTO2 RACE REPORT

- Darryn Binder withdrew from the race after being declared unfit due to right ankle and left hand trauma sustained from a crash in Practice 3.

=== Moto3 ===
| Pos. | No. | Rider | Constructor | Laps | Time/Retired | Grid | Points |
|---|---|---|---|---|---|---|---|
| 1 | 95 | (Netherlands) Collin Veijer | Husqvarna | 15 | 33:30.072 | 2 | 25 |
| 2 | 71 | (Japan) Ayumu Sasaki | Husqvarna | 15 | +0.066 | 5 | 20 |
| 3 | 5 | (Spain) Jaume Masià | Honda | 15 | +0.328 | 1 | 16 |
| 4 | 48 | (Spain) Iván Ortolá | KTM | 15 | +6.830 | 4 | 13 |
| 5 | 31 | (Spain) Adrián Fernández | Honda | 15 | +7.191 | 18 | 11 |
| 6 | 43 | (Spain) Xavier Artigas | CFMoto | 15 | +7.354 | 13 | 10 |
| 7 | 66 | (Australia) Joel Kelso | CFMoto | 15 | +7.400 | 7 | 9 |
| 8 | 7 | (Italy) Filippo Farioli | KTM | 15 | +11.175 | 16 | 8 |
| 9 | 6 | (Japan) Ryusei Yamanaka | Gas Gas | 15 | +11.287 | 12 | 7 |
| 10 | 18 | (Italy) Matteo Bertelle | Honda | 15 | +11.441 | 3 | 6 |
| 11 | 53 | (Turkey) Deniz Öncü | KTM | 15 | +14.095 | 9 | 5 |
| 12 | 21 | (Spain) Vicente Pérez | KTM | 15 | +14.490 | 17 | 4 |
| 13 | 19 | (United Kingdom) Scott Ogden | Honda | 15 | +15.600 | 22 | 3 |
| 14 | 70 | (United Kingdom) Joshua Whatley | Honda | 15 | +17.148 | 27 | 2 |
| 15 | 82 | (Italy) Stefano Nepa | KTM | 15 | +17.195 | 26 | 1 |
| 16 | 20 | (France) Lorenzo Fellon | KTM | 15 | +17.251 | 24 | |
| 17 | 44 | (Spain) David Muñoz | KTM | 15 | +33.878 (Note: 27-second time penalty for irresponsible riding.) | 8 | |
| 18 | 38 | (Spain) David Salvador | KTM | 15 | +35.410 | 23 | |
| 19 | 64 | (Indonesia) Mario Aji | Honda | 15 | +35.517 | 19 | |
| 20 | 63 | (Malaysia) Syarifuddin Azman | KTM | 15 | +55.108 | 28 | |
| Ret | 99 | (Spain) José Antonio Rueda | KTM | 12 | Accident | 6 | |
| Ret | 27 | (Japan) Kaito Toba | Honda | 11 | Accident | 25 | |
| Ret | 80 | (Colombia) David Alonso | Gas Gas | 5 | Collision damage | 21 | |
| Ret | 10 | (Brazil) Diogo Moreira | KTM | 4 | Collision | 10 | |
| Ret | 54 | (Italy) Riccardo Rossi | Honda | 4 | Collision | 14 | |
| Ret | 96 | (Spain) Daniel Holgado | KTM | 4 | Collision | 15 | |
| Ret | 72 | (Japan) Taiyo Furusato | Honda | 4 | Accident | 20 | |
| Ret | 55 | (Italy) Romano Fenati | Honda | 3 | Accident | 11 | |
Fastest lap: (Japan) Ayumu Sasaki (Husqvarna) – 2:12.268 (lap 2)
OFFICIAL MOTO3 RACE REPORT

== Championship standings after the race ==
Below are the standings for the top five riders, constructors, and teams after the round.

=== MotoGP ===
Riders' Championship standings

| | Pos. | Rider | Points |
|---|---|---|---|
| | 1 | (Italy) Francesco Bagnaia | 412 |
| | 2 | (Spain) Jorge Martín | 398 |
| | 3 | (Italy) Marco Bezzecchi | 323 |
| | 4 | (South Africa) Brad Binder | 254 |
| 1 | 5 | (France) Johann Zarco | 200 |

Constructors' Championship standings

| | Pos. | Constructor | Points |
|---|---|---|---|
| | 1 | (Italy) Ducati | 626 |
| | 2 | (Austria) KTM | 334 |
| | 3 | (Italy) Aprilia | 292 |
| 1 | 4 | (Japan) Yamaha | 176 |
| 1 | 5 | (Japan) Honda | 169 |

Teams' Championship standings

| | Pos. | Team | Points |
|---|---|---|---|
| | 1 | (Italy) Prima Pramac Racing | 598 |
| 1 | 2 | (Italy) Ducati Lenovo Team | 498 |
| 1 | 3 | (Italy) Mooney VR46 Racing Team | 494 |
| | 4 | (Austria) Red Bull KTM Factory Racing | 410 |
| | 5 | (Italy) Aprilia Racing | 373 |

=== Moto2 ===
Riders' Championship standings

| | Pos. | Rider | Points |
|---|---|---|---|
| | 1 | (Spain) Pedro Acosta | 320.5 |
| | 2 | (Italy) Tony Arbolino | 243.5 |
| | 3 | (United Kingdom) Jake Dixon | 183 |
| 2 | 4 | (Spain) Fermín Aldeguer | 162 |
| 1 | 5 | (Spain) Arón Canet | 159 |

Constructors' Championship standings

| Pos. | Constructor | Points |
|---|---|---|
| 1 | (Germany) Kalex | 422.5 |
| 2 | (Italy) Boscoscuro | 236 |
| 3 | (Switzerland) Forward | 4 |

Teams' Championship standings

| Pos. | Team | Points |
|---|---|---|
| 1 | (Finland) Red Bull KTM Ajo | 399.5 |
| 2 | (Belgium) Elf Marc VDS Racing Team | 334.5 |
| 3 | (Italy) Beta Tools Speed Up | 289 |
| 4 | (Japan) Idemitsu Honda Team Asia | 273 |
| 5 | (Spain) Pons Wegow Los40 | 243 |

=== Moto3 ===
Riders' Championship standings

| Pos. | Rider | Points |
|---|---|---|
| 1 | (Spain) Jaume Masià | 246 |
| 2 | (Japan) Ayumu Sasaki | 233 |
| 3 | (Colombia) David Alonso | 205 |
| 4 | (Spain) Daniel Holgado | 205 |
| 5 | (Turkey) Deniz Öncü | 196 |

Constructors' Championship standings

| Pos. | Constructor | Points |
|---|---|---|
| 1 | (Austria) KTM | 362 |
| 2 | (Japan) Honda | 297 |
| 3 | (Sweden) Husqvarna | 272 |
| 4 | (Spain) Gas Gas | 230 |
| 5 | (China) CFMoto | 101 |

Teams' Championship standings

| | Pos. | Team | Points |
|---|---|---|---|
| | 1 | (Germany) Liqui Moly Husqvarna Intact GP | 363 |
| 1 | 2 | (Luxembourg) Leopard Racing | 319 |
| 1 | 3 | (Finland) Red Bull KTM Ajo | 307 |
| | 4 | (Spain) Gaviota GasGas Aspar Team | 283 |
| | 5 | (Italy) Angeluss MTA Team | 271 |

== Notes ==
| Previous race: 2023 Thailand Grand Prix | FIM Grand Prix World Championship; 2023 season | Next race: 2023 Qatar Grand Prix |
| Previous race: 2022 Malaysian Grand Prix | Malaysian motorcycle Grand Prix | Next race: 2024 Malaysian Grand Prix |
