= Marco Bezzecchi =

Italian motorcycle racer

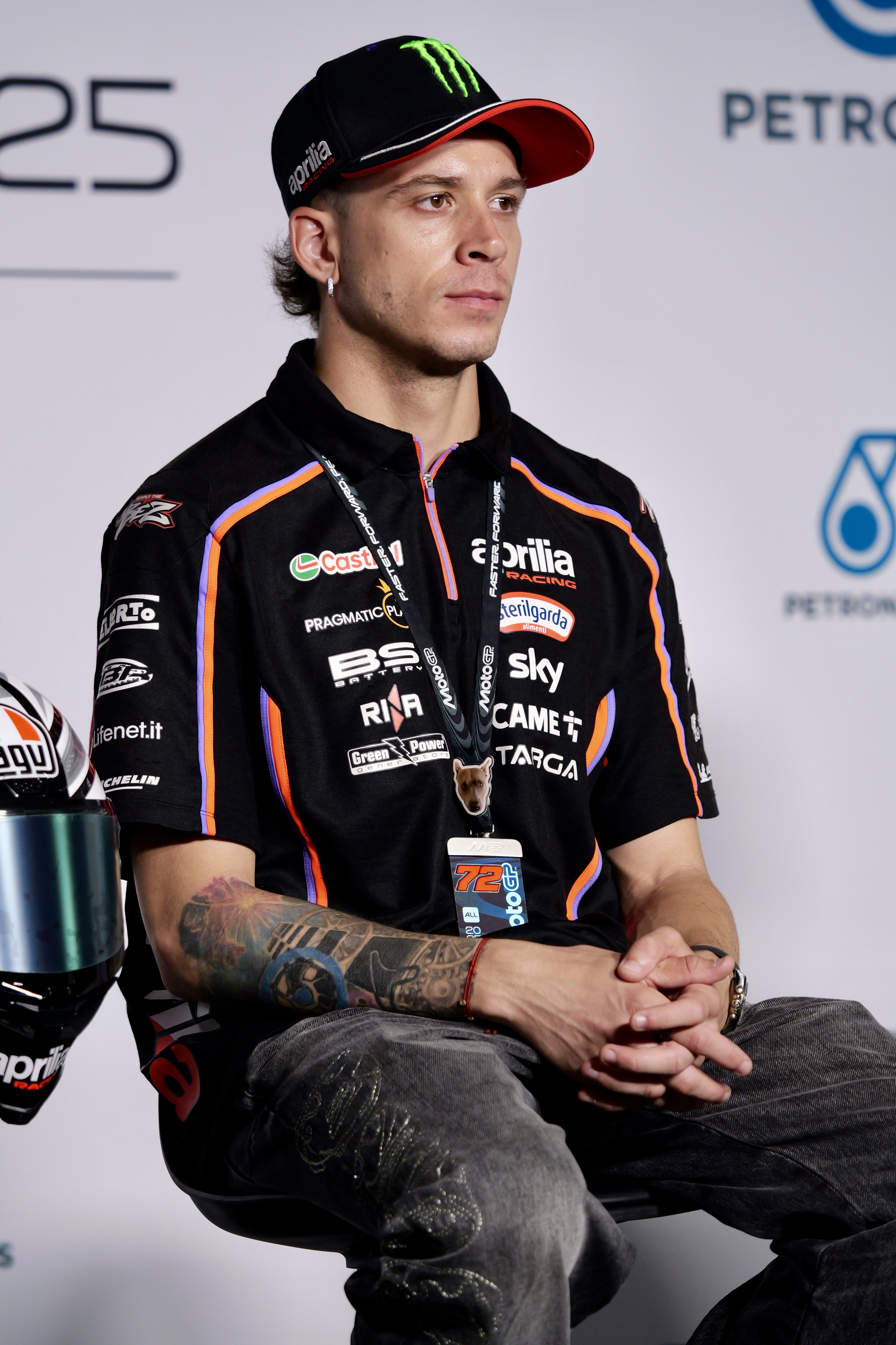
- Bezzecchi at the 2025 Malaysian Grand Prix
- Nationality: Italian
- Born: 12 November 1998 (age 28); Rimini, Italy
- Current team: Aprilia Racing
- Bike number: 72
- Website: simplythebez.com
Motorcycle racing career statistics
MotoGP World Championship
Active years	2022–
Manufacturers	Ducati (2022–2024); Aprilia (2025–)
Championships	0
2025 championship position	3rd (353 pts)
Starts / Wins / Podiums / Poles / F. laps / Points; 98 / 12 / 30 / 14 / 9 / 1303
Moto2 World Championship
Active years	2019–2021
Manufacturers	KTM, Kalex
Championships	0
2021 championship position	3rd (214 pts)
Starts / Wins / Podiums / Poles / F. laps / Points; 52 / 3 / 14 / 2 / 1 / 415
Moto3 World Championship
Active years	2015–2018
Manufacturers	Mahindra, KTM
Championships	0
2018 championship position	3rd (214 pts)
Starts / Wins / Podiums / Poles / F. laps / Points; 40 / 3 / 10 / 2 / 0 / 234

Marco Bezzecchi (born 12 November 1998) is an Italian Grand Prix motorcycle racer who competes in the 2026 MotoGP World Championship for Aprilia Racing. He made his 2022 MotoGP debut with the VR46 Racing Team and achieved his first-ever victory in the premier-class at the 2023 Argentine motorcycle Grand Prix. Bezzecchi is a member of the VR46 Riders Academy, a motorcycle development program spearheaded by Valentino Rossi.

Bezzecchi was selected as the 2022 MotoGP Rookie of the Year and has achieved nine premier-class victories. In 2025, he joined the Aprilia Racing factory team, with whom he won his first race for the team at the 2025 British Grand Prix. Bezzecchi is contracted to remain at Aprilia until at least the end of the 2028 season.

== Career ==
=== Junior career ===
Bezzecchi won the Italian Moto3 championship in 2015, and made his debut in the 2015 FIM CEV Moto3 Junior World Championship that season. He ended the year 16th in the standings, with 29 points, finishing in the top-ten on three occasions. The 2016 FIM CEV Moto3 Junior World Championship was very similar for him, finishing in the top-ten three times, this time scoring 31 points, enough for 18th in the standings.

=== Moto3 World Championship ===
Bezzecchi made his debut in the 2015 Moto3 World Championship, with two wild-card appearances, finishing 26th in Qatar, and retiring in his home Grand Prix of Italy.

==== Mahindra Racing (2016) ====
In the 2016 season, Bezzecchi again competed in two races, retiring in Austria and finishing 24th at the British Grand Prix. On January 21, 2016, Bezzecchi officially joined the VR46 Riders Academy, an Italian training program for young riders founded in 2013 by Valentino Rossi.

==== CIP (2017) ====
Bezzecchi competed full time in the 2017 Moto3 World Championship, riding for Mahindra CIP, teammate of Manuel Pagliani. Bezzecchi had a slow rookie season, up until the race in Japan; he finished in 14th once, and 15th twice for a total of four points, but in the Motegi race, he managed a third place, his maiden podium in Moto3. He ended the season with 20 points and 23rd in the championship standings, second among the rookies that year.

==== Redox PrüstelGP (2018) ====
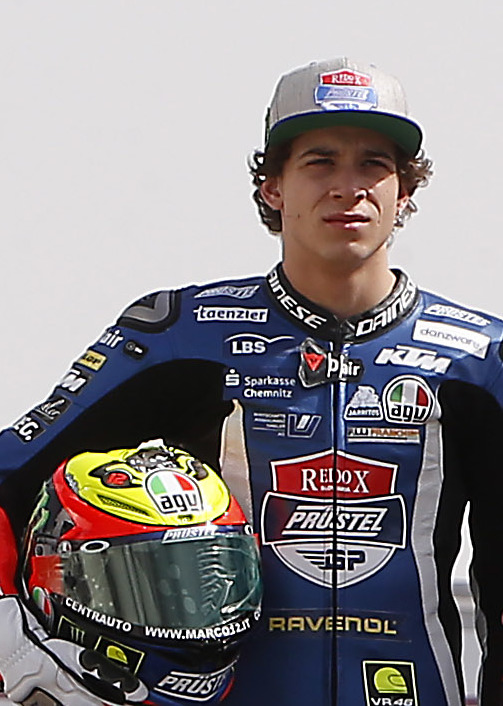
Bezzecchi in 2018

For the 2018 season, Bezzecchi would switch teams and ride for Prüstel GP. He won races in Argentina, Austria, and Japan, finished second five times, once in third. He collected two pole positions, ending the season with nine podiums and 214 points, third in the overall championship standings.

=== Moto2 World Championship ===
==== Red Bull KTM Tech3 (2019) ====
Partnering Philipp Öttl at Red Bull KTM Tech3 for the 2019 Moto2 World Championship, Bezzecchi had a difficult rookie season at Tech3, finishing in the points only four times. He ended his season with 17 points and 23rd in the championship standings.

==== Sky Racing Team VR46 (2020–2021) ====
For the 2020 Moto2 World Championship, Bezzecchi joined the newly formed Sky Racing Team VR46, alongside Luca Marini. The duo would have a successful season, winning the teams' championship by 113 points with five race wins between them; Marini had three wins, Bezzecchi two. Bezzecchi won at the Austria Grand Prix and the Valencia Grand Prix, finished second in Misano and Rimini, and finished third at Jerez, Le Mans, and the second Valencia race. He ended his season with seven podiums and 184 points, coming in fourth in the championship standings.

Following Luca Marini moving up to MotoGP, Bezzecchi's teammate for the 2021 season was Celestino Vietti. Bezzecchi often finished in the top-five, winning a race in Austria, finishing second in Jerez and Silverstone, and third in Le Mans, Mugello, Germany, and Austin. He finished the year third in the rider's championship with 214 points.

=== MotoGP World Championship ===
==== Mooney VR46 Racing Team (2022–2024) ====
For the 2022 season, Bezzecchi was confirmed to be moving up to the premier class, partnering his 2020 teammate at Mooney VR46 Racing Team, Luca Marini. He picked up his first podium finish in MotoGP at the Dutch TT. Later in the season, he took his maiden MotoGP pole position at the Thailand Grand Prix.

In 2023, Bezzecchi achieved his first MotoGP win at the Argentine Republic Grand Prix in rainy conditions, and thus seized the championship lead for the first time in the premier class. His win in Argentina was notably the maiden win for the VR46 Racing Team. Bezzecchi went on to win the 1000th MotoGP Grand Prix at the French Grand Prix. A third win came in India, completing the season in third place.

==== Aprilia Racing (2025–) ====
On 24 June 2024, it was announced that Bezzecchi would join Aprilia Racing for 2025/2026 alongside Jorge Martín, who Bezzecchi fought with for the 2018 Moto3 Championship. Despite facing stability issues from his adjustment to the Aprilia in the beginning of the 2025 season, Bezzecchi won the British Grand Prix after starting from 11th on the grid; this was his first win in over 600 days (since the 2023 Indian Grand Prix). Bezzecchi performed well in the leadup to the summer break, with two second-place finishes in Assen and Brno, only missing out on three successive podiums due to a crash at the German Grand Prix in between the Dutch and Czech rounds. Bezzecchi finished the first half of the season in fourth, the highest-placed non-Ducati rider. Upon return from the summer break, Bezzecchi scored his first pole position with Aprilia at the Austrian Grand Prix on a track traditionally not suited to the strengths of the RS-GP, with fourth in the sprint and third in the feature race. Bezzecchi would go on to claim more pole positions at the San Marino, Indonesian, Portuguese and Valencian Grand Prix, the last two of which he would go on to win.

At the start of February 2026, Bezzecchi penned a two-year new contract to remain at Aprilia through the 2027 and 2028 seasons. Bezzecchi began the 2026 season by winning the first three grands prix in Thailand, Brazil, and the USA. By leading the U.S. Grand Prix, Bezzecchi broke Jorge Lorenzo's record for most consecutive laps led. In May 2026, he won the Italian motorcycle Grand Prix at the Mugello Circuit for the first time in his career, extending his current lead over teammate Jorge Martin to 17 points.

After crashing out during the Sprint Race at the 2026 Czech Republic motorcycle Grand Prix, Bezzecchi physically slapped a marshal who was attempting to pick up the bike. He was then excluded from the main race the following day.

On June 25, 2026, Aprilia Racing revealed that fellow VR46 Riders Academy member Francesco Bagnaia would be joining Bezzecchi at Aprilia for the 2027 season, with a four-year contract.

== Career statistics ==
=== CIV Moto3 Championship ===
==== Races by year ====
(key) (Races in bold indicate pole position, races in italics indicate fastest lap)

Year	Bike	1	2	3	4	5	6	7	8	9	10	Pos	Pts
2015	Mahindra	**MIS1**; 1	**MIS2**; 1	**VAL1**; Ret	**VAL2**; 1	MUG1; 1	MUG2; Ret	**IMO1**; 1	**IMO2**; Ret	**MUG2**; 1	**MUG2**; 1	1st	175

=== FIM CEV Moto3 Junior World Championship ===
==== Races by year ====
(key) (Races in bold indicate pole position, races in italics indicate fastest lap)

Year	Bike	1	2	3	4	5	6	7	8	9	10	11	12	Pos	Pts
2015	Mahindra	ALG	LMS	CAT1	CAT2	ARA1; 8	ARA2; 7	ALB; Ret	NAV; 8	JER1; 22	JER2; 17	VAL1; 12	VAL2; Ret	16th	29
2016	Mahindra	VAL1; Ret	VAL2; 11	LMS; 18	ARA; 8	CAT1; Ret	CAT2; 15	ALB; Ret	ALG; 9	JER1; Ret	JER2; 6	VAL1	VAL2	18th	31

=== Grand Prix motorcycle racing ===
==== By season ====
Season	Class	Motorcycle	Team	Race	Win	Podium	Pole	FLap	Pts	Plcd
2015	Moto3	Mahindra	San Carlo Team Italia	1	0	0	0	0	0	NC
2015	Moto3	Mahindra	Minimoto Portomaggiore	1	0	0	0	0	0	NC
2016	Moto3	Mahindra	Mahindra Racing	2	0	0	0	0	0	47th
2017	Moto3	Mahindra	CIP	18	0	1	0	0	20	23rd
2018	Moto3	KTM	Redox PrüstelGP	18	3	9	2	0	214	**3rd**
2019	Moto2	KTM	Red Bull KTM Tech3	19	0	0	0	0	17	23rd
2020	Moto2	Kalex	Sky Racing Team VR46	15	2	7	1	1	184	4th
2021	Moto2	Kalex	Sky Racing Team VR46	18	1	7	1	0	214	**3rd**
2022	MotoGP	Ducati	Mooney VR46 Racing Team	20	0	1	1	0	111	14th
2023	MotoGP	Ducati	Mooney VR46 Racing Team	20	3	7	3	4	329	**3rd**
2024	MotoGP	Ducati	Pertamina Enduro VR46 Racing Team	20	0	1	0	0	153	12th
2025	MotoGP	Aprilia	Aprilia Racing	22	3	9	5	2	353	**3rd**
2026	MotoGP	Aprilia	Aprilia Racing	16	6	12	5	3	357*	**3rd***
Total				**190**	**18**	**54**	**18**	**10**	**1952**	

==== By class ====
Class	Seasons	1st GP	1st pod	1st win	Race	Win	Podiums	Pole	FLap	Pts	WChmp
Moto3	2015–2018	2015 Qatar	2017 Japan	2018 Argentina	40	3	10	2	0	234	0
Moto2	2019–2021	2019 Qatar	2020 Andalusia	2020 Styria	52	3	14	2	1	415	0
MotoGP	2022–present	2022 Qatar	2022 Netherlands	2023 Argentina	98	12	30	14	9	1281	0
Total	2015–present				**190**	**18**	**54**	**18**	**10**	**1952**	**0**

==== Races by year ====
(key) (Races in bold indicate pole position; races in italics indicate fastest lap; ^{superscript} indicates point-scoring sprint position)

Year	Class	Bike	1	2	3	4	5	6	7	8	9	10	11	12	13	14	15	16	17	18	19	20	21	22	Pos	Pts
2015	Moto3	Mahindra	QAT; 26	AME	ARG	SPA	FRA	ITA; Ret	CAT	NED	GER	INP	CZE	GBR	RSM	ARA	JPN	AUS	MAL	VAL					NC	0
2016	Moto3	Mahindra	QAT	ARG	AME	SPA	FRA	ITA	CAT	NED	GER	AUT; Ret	CZE	GBR; 24	RSM	ARA	JPN	AUS	MAL	VAL					47th	0
2017	Moto3	Mahindra	QAT; 25	ARG; 19	AME; 17	SPA; Ret	FRA; 15	ITA; 17	CAT; 14	NED; 16	GER; 15	CZE; 22	AUT; Ret	GBR; 19	RSM; Ret	ARA; 19	JPN; 3	AUS; Ret	MAL; 19	VAL; 28					23rd	20
2018	Moto3	KTM	QAT; 14	ARG; 1	AME; 3	SPA; 2	FRA; Ret	ITA; 2	CAT; 2	NED; Ret	GER; 2	CZE; 6	**AUT**; 1	GBR; C	RSM; Ret	ARA; 2	**THA**; NC	JPN; 1	AUS; Ret	MAL; 5	VAL; 20				3rd	214
2019	Moto2	KTM	QAT; 26	ARG; 16	AME; Ret	SPA; 22	FRA; 18	ITA; 23	CAT; 23	NED; 10	GER; 19	CZE; 12	AUT; 23	GBR; 19	RSM; Ret	ARA; 15	THA; 10	JPN; Ret	AUS; Ret	MAL; Ret	VAL; 19				23rd	17
2020	Moto2	Kalex	QAT; 12	SPA; Ret	**ANC**; 3	CZE; 6	AUT; 6	STY; 1	RSM; 2	EMI; 2	CAT; 7	FRA; 3	ARA; Ret	TER; Ret	EUR; 1	VAL; 3	POR; 4								4th	184
2021	Moto2	Kalex	QAT; 4	DOH; 4	POR; 6	SPA; 2	FRA; 3	ITA; 3	CAT; 4	GER; 3	NED; 5	STY; 1	AUT; 10	**GBR**; 2	ARA; Ret	RSM; 5	AME; 3	EMI; Ret	ALR; 8	VAL; 20					3rd	214
2022	MotoGP	Ducati	QAT; Ret	INA; 20	ARG; 9	AME; Ret	POR; 15	SPA; 9	FRA; 12	ITA; 5	CAT; Ret	GER; 11	NED; 2	GBR; 10	AUT; 9	RSM; 17	ARA; 10	JPN; 10	**THA**; 16	AUS; 4	MAL; 4	VAL; 11			14th	111
2023	MotoGP	Ducati	POR; 3	ARG; 1^{2}	AME; 6^{6}	SPA; Ret^{9}	FRA; 1^{7}	ITA; 8^{2}	GER; 4^{7}	**NED**; 2^{1}	**GBR**; Ret^{2}	AUT; 3	CAT; 12^{8}	RSM; 2^{2}	**IND**; 1^{5}	JPN; 4^{6}	INA; 5^{3}	AUS; 6	THA; 4^{6}	MAL; 6^{7}	QAT; 13	VAL; Ret^{7}			3rd	329
2024	MotoGP	Ducati	QAT; 14	POR; 6	AME; 8	SPA; 3	FRA; Ret	CAT; 11^{9}	ITA; 13	NED; Ret	GER; 8	GBR; 8	AUT; 6^{8}	ARA; 6^{9}	RSM; 5	EMI; 4^{8}	INA; 5^{4}	JPN; 7	AUS; 19	THA; Ret^{7}	MAL; 9	SLD; 9^{8}			12th	153
2025	MotoGP	Aprilia	THA; 6	ARG; Ret^{6}	AME; 6	QAT; 9^{9}	SPA; 14^{8}	FRA; 14	GBR; 1^{4}	ARA; 8^{8}	ITA; 5^{6}	NED; 2^{3}	GER; Ret^{2}	CZE; 2^{4}	**AUT**; 3^{4}	HUN; 3^{7}	CAT; Ret	**RSM**; 2^{1}	JPN; 4	**INA**; Ret^{1}	AUS; 3^{1}	MAL; 11^{6}	**POR**; 1^{3}	**VAL**; 1^{5}	3rd	353
2026	MotoGP	Aprilia	**THA**; 1	BRA; 1^{4}	USA; 1	SPA; 2	FRA; 2^{3}	CAT; 4^{9}	**ITA**; 1^{4}	HUN; Ret^{3}	CZE; EX	NED; Ret^{4}	GER; DNS	GBR; 3^{3}	**ARA**; 3^{3}	**RSM**; Ret^{2}	AUT; 3^{3}	JPN; 3^{6}	INA; 1	AUS; C^{4}	MAL; 6^{3}	**QAT**; 1	POR	VAL	3rd*	357*

* Season still in progress.
