= Miquel Pons =

Spanish motorcycle racer

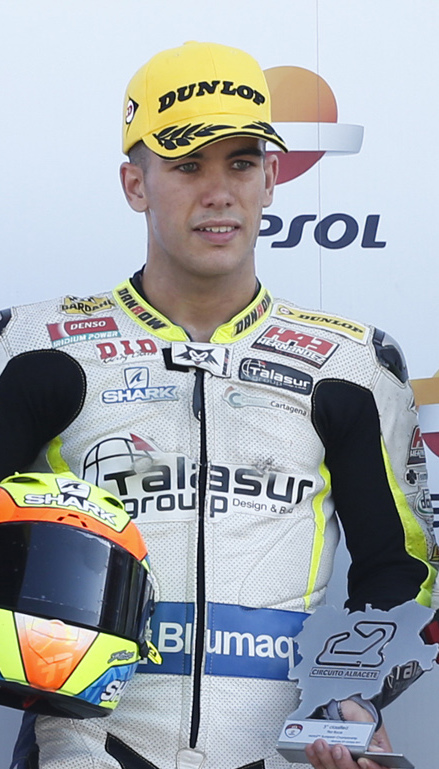
- Pons in 2019
- Nationality: Spanish
- Born: 1 August 1997 (age 29); Palma de Mallorca, Spain
- Current team: Axxis – MSi Team
- Bike number: 77
Motorcycle racing career statistics
Moto2 World Championship
| Active years | 2021 |
| Manufacturers | MV Agusta |
| Championships | 0 |
| 2021 championship position | 36th (0 pts) |
Starts / Wins / Podiums / Poles / F. laps / Points; 1 / 0 / 0 / 0 / 0 / 0
MotoE World Championship
| Active years | 2021– |
| Manufacturers | Energica, Ducati |
| Championships | 0 |
| 2024 championship position | 12th (94 pts) |
Starts / Wins / Podiums / Poles / F. laps / Points; 50 / 1 / 6 / 1 / 1 / 389
Supersport World Championship
| Active years | 2017–2024 |
| Manufacturers | Kawasaki, Yamaha, Honda |
| 2024 championship position | 38th (2 pts) |
Starts / Wins / Podiums / Poles / F. laps / Points; 15 / 0 / 0 / 0 / 0 / 27

Miquel Pons Payeras (born 1 August 1997) is a Spanish motorcycle racer who currently competes in the MotoE World Championship.

Pons was the Balearic Minicross and Supermotard Champion in 2006, the Balearic 65cc MX Champion in 2007 and the Balearic 125GP Road Racing Champion in 2010.

== Career statistics ==
=== FIM CEV Stock 600 European Championship ===
==== Races by year ====
(key) (Races in bold indicate pole position, races in italics indicate fastest lap)

| Year | Bike | 1 | 2 | 3 | 4 | 5 | 6 | 7 | 8 | 9 | 10 | 11 | Pos | Pts |
|---|---|---|---|---|---|---|---|---|---|---|---|---|---|---|
| 2016 | Kawasaki | VAL1 | VAL2 | ARA1 | ARA2 | CAT1 | CAT2 | ALB | ALG1 | ALG2 | JER | VAL; 3 | 10th | 16 |

=== FIM Moto2 European Championship ===
==== Races by year ====
(key) (Races in bold indicate pole position) (Races in italics indicate fastest lap)

| Year | Bike | 1 | 2 | 3 | 4 | 5 | 6 | 7 | 8 | 9 | 10 | 11 | Pos | Pts |
|---|---|---|---|---|---|---|---|---|---|---|---|---|---|---|
| 2014 | Inmotec | JER; 15 | ARA1; 11 | ARA2; 10 | CAT; Ret | ALB; 10 | NAV1; 8 | NAV2; Ret | ALG1; 10 | ALG2; Ret | VAL; 9 | | 12th | 39 |
| 2015 | Inmotec | ALG1; 9 | ALG2; 30 | CAT | ARA1; 14 | ARA2; 13 | ALB; 10 | NAV1; 10 | NAV2; Ret | JER; 17 | VAL1; 13 | VAL2; 14 | 14th | 29 |
| 2018 | Kalex | EST1; 7 | EST2; 8 | VAL; 8 | CAT1; 8 | CAT2; Ret | ARA1; 7 | ARA2; 6 | JER; 9 | ALB1; 8 | ALB2; 12 | VAL; 5 | 9th | 80 |
| 2019 | Kalex | EST1; 4 | EST2; Ret | VAL; 5 | CAT1; 7 | CAT2; 7 | ARA1; 3 | ARA2; 7 | JER; Ret | ALB1; 3 | ALB2; 4 | VAL; 20 | 6th | 96 |

| Year | Bike | 1 | | 2 | 3 | | 4 | 5 | | 6 | | 7 | Pos | Pts |
| Year | Bike | R1 | R2 | R1 | R1 | R2 | R1 | R1 | R2 | R1 | R2 | R1 | Pos | Pts |
|---|---|---|---|---|---|---|---|---|---|---|---|---|---|---|
| 2022 | Brevo | EST; DNS | EST; DNS | VAL; 9 | CAT; DSQ | CAT; 5 | JER | POR | POR | ARA; Ret | ARA; Ret | VAL; Ret | 20th | 18 |

=== Supersport World Championship ===
==== Races by year ====
(key) (Races in bold indicate pole position; races in italics indicate fastest lap)

| Year | Bike | 1 | 2 | 3 | 4 | 5 | 6 | 7 | 8 | 9 | 10 | 11 | 12 | Pos. | Pts |
|---|---|---|---|---|---|---|---|---|---|---|---|---|---|---|---|
| 2017 | Kawasaki | AUS | THA | SPA | NED | ITA | GBR | ITA | GER | POR | FRA | SPA; 20 | QAT | NC | 0 |
| 2018 | Kawasaki | AUS | THA | SPA | NED | ITA | GBR | CZE | ITA | POR; 13 | FRA | ARG | QAT | 30th | 3 |
| 2019 | Yamaha | AUS | THA | SPA | NED | ITA | SPA | ITA | GBR | POR; 10 | FRA | ARG | QAT | 25th | 6 |

| Year | Bike | 1 | | 2 | | 3 | | 4 | | 5 | | 6 | | 7 | | 8 | | 9 | | 10 | | 11 | | 12 | | Pos | Pts |
| Year | Bike | R1 | R2 | R1 | R2 | R1 | R2 | R1 | R2 | R1 | R2 | R1 | R2 | R1 | R2 | R1 | R2 | R1 | R2 | R1 | R2 | R1 | R2 | R1 | R2 | Pos | Pts |
|---|---|---|---|---|---|---|---|---|---|---|---|---|---|---|---|---|---|---|---|---|---|---|---|---|---|---|---|
| 2020 | Yamaha | AUS | | SPA | SPA | POR; 14 | POR; 9 | SPA | SPA | SPA | SPA | | | | | | | | | | | | | | | 21st | 16 |
| 2020 | Honda | | | | | | | | | | | SPA; 9 | SPA; 17 | FRA | FRA | POR | POR | | | | | | | | | 21st | 16 |
| 2024 | Yamaha | AUS | AUS | SPA | SPA | NED | NED | ITA | ITA | GBR | GBR | CZE | CZE | POR | POR | FRA | FRA | ITA; 14 | ITA; Ret | SPA; 26 | SPA; Ret | POR; Ret | POR; 20 | SPA; 16 | SPA; 18 | 38th | 2 |

=== Grand Prix motorcycle racing ===
==== By season ====
| Season | Class | Motorcycle | Team | Race | Win | Podium | Pole | FLap | Pts | Plcd |
|---|---|---|---|---|---|---|---|---|---|---|
| 2021 | Moto2 | MV Agusta | MV Agusta Forward Racing | 1 | 0 | 0 | 0 | 0 | 0 | 36th |
| 2021 | MotoE | Energica Ego Corsa | LCR E-Team | 6 | 1 | 2 | 0 | 0 | 73 | 7th |
| 2022 | MotoE | Energica Ego Corsa | LCR E-Team | 12 | 0 | 4 | 1 | 1 | 124 | 5th |
| 2023 | MotoE | Ducati V21L | LCR E-Team | 16 | 0 | 0 | 0 | 0 | 98 | 12th |
| 2024 | MotoE | Ducati V21L | Axxis – MSi | 16 | 0 | 0 | 0 | 0 | 94 | 12th |
| Total | | | | **51** | **1** | **6** | **1** | **1** | **389** | |

==== By class ====
| Class | Seasons | 1st GP | 1st Pod | 1st Win | Race | Win | Podiums | Pole | FLap | Pts | WChmp |
|---|---|---|---|---|---|---|---|---|---|---|---|
| Moto2 | 2021–present | 2021 Portugal | | | 1 | 0 | 0 | 0 | 0 | 0 | 0 |
| MotoE | 2021–present | 2021 Spain | 2021 Catalan | 2021 Catalan | 50 | 1 | 6 | 1 | 1 | 389 | 0 |
| Total | 2021–present | | | | **51** | **1** | **6** | **1** | **1** | **389** | **0** |

==== Races by year ====
(key) (Races in bold indicate pole position; races in italics indicate fastest lap)

| Year | Class | Bike | 1 | 2 | 3 | 4 | 5 | 6 | 7 | 8 | 9 | 10 | 11 | 12 | 13 | 14 | 15 | 16 | 17 | 18 | Pos | Pts |
|---|---|---|---|---|---|---|---|---|---|---|---|---|---|---|---|---|---|---|---|---|---|---|
| 2021 | Moto2 | MV Agusta | QAT | DOH | POR; 19 | SPA | FRA | ITA | CAT | GER | NED | STY | AUT | GBR | ARA | RSM | AME | EMI | ALR | VAL | 36th | 0 |
| 2021 | MotoE | Energica | SPA; 5 | FRA; DNS | CAT; 1 | NED; 10 | AUT; 12 | RSM1; 5 | RSM2; 3 | | | | | | | | | | | | 7th | 73 |
| 2022 | MotoE | Energica | **SPA1**; 8 | **SPA2**; 2 | FRA1; 6 | FRA2; 10 | ITA1; 7 | ITA2; 3 | NED1; 6 | NED2; Ret | AUT1; 3 | AUT2; 2 | RSM1; Ret | RSM2; 7 | | | | | | | 5th | 124 |
| 2023 | MotoE | Ducati | FRA1; Ret | FRA2; 12 | ITA1; 10 | ITA2; 15 | GER1; 8 | GER2; 11 | NED1; 11 | NED2; 5 | GBR1; 7 | GBR2; Ret | AUT1; 6 | AUT2; 4 | CAT1; 8 | CAT2; 6 | RSM1; 15 | RSM2; 9 | | | 12th | 98 |
| 2024 | MotoE | Ducati | POR1; Ret | POR2; 11 | FRA1; 15 | FRA2; 7 | CAT1; 9 | CAT2; 9 | ITA1; 9 | ITA2; 11 | NED1; 4 | NED2; 6 | GER1; 6 | GER2; 7 | AUT1; Ret | AUT2; Ret | RSM1; 11 | RSM2; 10 | | | 12th | 94 |
