= Marc Alcoba =

Spanish motorcycle racer (born 2000)

- Nationality: Spanish
- Born: 1 September 2000 (age 26); Tarragona, Spain
- Current team: Slider Endurance
- Bike number: 119
Motorcycle racing career statistics
MotoE World Championship
Active years	2022
Manufacturers	Energica
2022 championship position	13th (46.5 pts)
Starts / Wins / Podiums / Poles / F. laps / Points; 12 / 0 / 0 / 0 / 0 / 46.5
Supersport World Championship
Active years	2021–present
Manufacturers	Yamaha
Championships	0
2022 championship position	NC (0 pts)
Starts / Wins / Podiums / Poles / F. laps / Points; 26 / 0 / 0 / 0 / 0 / 40

Championship titles
- Copa RACC (2010); Copa Honda CBR250R (2013, 2014); RFME CEV Moto3 Sport Production Championship (2016); RFME CEV Stock600 Championship (2018)

Marc Alcoba (born 1 September 2000) is a Spanish Grand Prix motorcycle racer, who competed in the MotoE World Cup for OpenBank Aspar Team MotoE.

== Career statistics ==
=== FIM Moto2 European Championship ===
==== Races by year ====
(key) (Races in bold indicate pole position) (Races in italics indicate fastest lap)

Year	Bike	1		2	3		4	5		6		7	Pos	Pts
Year	Bike	R1	R2	R1	R1	R2	R1	R1	R2	R1	R2	R1	Pos	Pts
2022	Kalex	EST	EST	VAL	CAT; 8	CAT; 6	JER; Ret	POR	POR	ARA	ARA	VAL	21st	18

=== Grand Prix motorcycle racing ===
==== By season ====
Season	Class	Motorcycle	Team	Race	Win	Podium	Pole	FLap	Pts	Plcd
2022	MotoE	Energica Ego Corsa	OpenBank Aspar Team	12	0	0	0	0	46.5	13th
Total				**12**	**0**	**0**	**0**	**0**	**46.5**	

==== By class ====
Class	Seasons	1st GP	1st Pod	1st Win	Race	Win	Podiums	Pole	FLap	Pts	WChmp
MotoE	2022–present	2022 Spain	2022 Italy		12	0	0	0	0	46.5	0
Total	2022–present				**12**	**0**	**0**	**0**	**0**	**46.5**	**0**

==== Races by year ====
(key) (Races in bold indicate pole position; races in italics indicate fastest lap)

Year	Class	Bike	1	2	3	4	5	6	7	8	9	10	11	12	Pos	Pts
2022	MotoE	Energica	SPA1; 9	SPA2; Ret	FRA1; Ret	FRA2; 9	ITA1; 5	ITA2; 7	NED1; Ret	NED2; 13^{‡}	AUT1; 12	AUT2; 15	RSM1; 13	RSM2; 13	13th	46.5

^{‡} Half points awarded as less than two thirds of the race distance (but at least three full laps) was completed.

=== Supersport World Championship ===
==== Races by year ====
(key) (Races in bold indicate pole position; races in italics indicate fastest lap)

Year	Bike	1	2	3	4	5	6	7	8	9	10	11	12	13	14	15	16	17	18	19	20	21	22	23	24	Pos	Pts
2021	Yamaha	SPA; Ret	SPA; 7	POR; 13	POR; 10	ITA; 16	ITA; 8	NED; 9	NED; 9	CZE; Ret	CZE; DNS	SPA	SPA	FRA	FRA	SPA; 29	SPA; 19	SPA; C	SPA; DNS	POR	POR	ARG	ARG	INA	INA	16th	40
2022	Yamaha	SPA	SPA	NED	NED	POR	POR	ITA	ITA	GBR	GBR	CZE	CZE	FRA	FRA	SPA; 28	SPA; 27	POR	POR	ARG	ARG	INA	INA	AUS	AUS	NC	0

=== FIM Endurance World Cup ===
Year	Team	Bike	Tyre	Rider	Pts	TC
2025	(France) Slider Endurance	Honda CBR1000RR	**D**	(Turkey) Rodi Pak Asrın (Spain) Marc Miralles González (Spain) Marc Alcoba (Italy) Jacopo Cretaro	20	13th
