= 2022 MotoE World Cup =

4th running of the MotoE World Cup

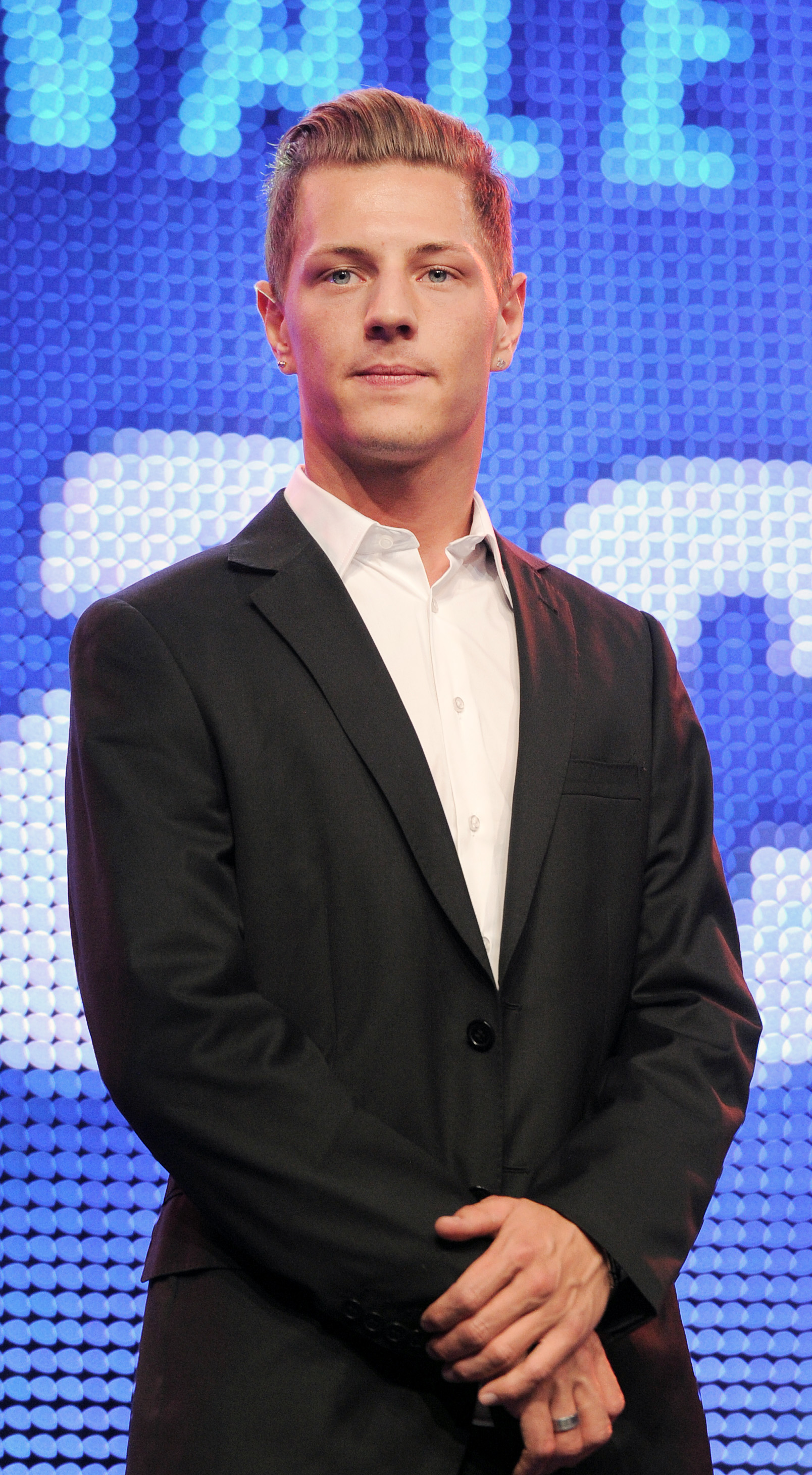
Dominique Aegerter (pictured in 2014) was the 2022 MotoE World Cup winner.

The 2022 MotoE World Cup (known officially as the 2022 FIM Enel MotoE World Cup for sponsorship reasons) was the fourth season of the MotoE World Cup for electric motorcycle racing, and was a support series of the 74th Fédération Internationale de Motocyclisme (FIM) Road Racing World Championship season.

This was the last season of Energica being the sole supplier of the World Cup as they withdrew from the Cup after the season, with Ducati taking their place as the new sole manufacturer starting 2023.

Dominique Aegerter clinched the championship after a crash from Eric Granado during race 1 in Misano, his first MotoE crown.

== Teams and riders ==
All teams used the series-specified Energica Ego Corsa.

Team	No.	Rider	Rounds
(Finland) Avant Ajo MotoE	78	(Japan) Hikari Okubo	All
(Spain) Avintia Esponsorama Racing	18	(Andorra) Xavier Cardelús	2–3, 5–6
(Spain) Avintia Esponsorama Racing	28	(Spain) Yeray Ruiz	1
(Spain) Avintia Esponsorama Racing	10	(Spain) Unai Orradre	4
(Germany) Dynavolt Intact GP	77	(Switzerland) Dominique Aegerter	All
(Italy) Felo Gresini MotoE	11	(Italy) Matteo Ferrari	All
(Italy) Felo Gresini MotoE	72	(Italy) Alessio Finello	All
(Monaco) LCR E-Team	51	(Brazil) Eric Granado	All
(Monaco) LCR E-Team	71	(Spain) Miquel Pons	All
(Italy) Octo Pramac MotoE	12	(Spain) Xavi Forés	All
(Italy) Octo Pramac MotoE	34	(Italy) Kevin Manfredi	All
(Italy) Ongetta Sic58 Squadracorse	21	(Italy) Kevin Zannoni	All
(Spain) OpenBank Aspar Team (Note: For rounds 5 and 6, the team used the team name Zinia Aspar Team.)	6	(Spain) María Herrera	All
(Spain) OpenBank Aspar Team	70	(Spain) Marc Alcoba	All
(Spain) Pons Racing 40	27	(Italy) Mattia Casadei	All
(Spain) Pons Racing 40	40	(Spain) Jordi Torres	1–2, 4–6
(Spain) Pons Racing 40	55	(Italy) Massimo Roccoli	3
(France) Tech3 E-Racing	4	(Spain) Héctor Garzó	All
(France) Tech3 E-Racing	17	(Spain) Álex Escrig	All
(Malaysia) WithU GRT RNF MotoE Team	7	(Italy) Niccolò Canepa	All
(Malaysia) WithU GRT RNF MotoE Team	38	(United Kingdom) Bradley Smith	4–6
(Malaysia) WithU GRT RNF MotoE Team	3	(Germany) Lukas Tulovic	1
(Malaysia) WithU GRT RNF MotoE Team	9	(Italy) Andrea Mantovani	2–3

Key
Regular rider
Replacement rider

=== Rider changes ===
- Mattia Casadei joined HP Pons 40, replacing Jasper Iwema.
- Eric Granado joined LCR E-Team, replacing Kevin Zannoni.
- Héctor Garzó moved back to MotoE after racing in Moto2 in 2021. He rejoined Tech3 E-Racing, the team he raced with during the 2019 MotoE season.

==== Mid-season changes ====
- Bradley Smith missed the opening three rounds after suffering a fractured vertebra during the 24 Hours of Le Mans. He was replaced by Lukas Tulovic for the Spanish round, while Andrea Mantovani replaced him for the French and Italian rounds.
- Xavier Cardelús missed the opening Spanish round due to injury sustained from a training accident. He was replaced by Yeray Ruiz. Cardelús also missed the Dutch round after having surgery on a ruptured tendon sustained during the previous Italian round. He was replaced by Unai Orradre.
- Jordi Torres missed the Italian round due to a fractured fibula sustained during race 1 of the previous French round. He was replaced by Massimo Roccoli.

== Regulation changes ==
Starting this season, standard MotoE events featured two Free Practice sessions, a Qualifying on Friday, and two races: one on Saturday and the other on Sunday.

E-Pole was replaced by more traditional Qualifying sessions: Qualifying session format: Q1 (10 minutes) – 10 min break – Q2 (10 minutes).

== Calendar ==
The following Grands Prix took place in 2022:

Round	Date	Grand Prix	Circuit
1	30 April	(Spain) Gran Premio Red Bull de España	Circuito de Jerez, Jerez de la Frontera
1	1 May	(Spain) Gran Premio Red Bull de España	Circuito de Jerez, Jerez de la Frontera
2	14 May	Shark Helmets Grand Prix de France	Bugatti Circuit, Le Mans
2	15 May	Shark Helmets Grand Prix de France	Bugatti Circuit, Le Mans
3	28 May	(Italy) Gran Premio d'Italia Oakley	Mugello Circuit, Scarperia e San Piero
3	29 May	(Italy) Gran Premio d'Italia Oakley	Mugello Circuit, Scarperia e San Piero
4	25 June	(Netherlands) Motul TT Assen	TT Circuit Assen, Assen
4	26 June	(Netherlands) Motul TT Assen	TT Circuit Assen, Assen
5	20 August	(Austria) CryptoData Motorrad Grand Prix von Österreich	Red Bull Ring, Spielberg
5	21 August	(Austria) CryptoData Motorrad Grand Prix von Österreich	Red Bull Ring, Spielberg
6	3 September	Gran Premio Gryfyn di San Marino e della Riviera di Rimini	Misano World Circuit, Misano Adriatico
6	4 September	Gran Premio Gryfyn di San Marino e della Riviera di Rimini	Misano World Circuit, Misano Adriatico
Cancelled Grand Prix
–	~~9 July~~	(Finland) Finnish motorcycle Grand Prix	Kymi Ring, Iitti
–	~~10 July~~	(Finland) Finnish motorcycle Grand Prix	Kymi Ring, Iitti

=== Grand Prix locations ===
Location of Grands Prix in 2022.
(scheduled Grand Prix: cancelled Grand Prix)

=== Calendar changes ===
Comparison between the configuration of the Red Bull Ring used in 2019 and 2021 (top), and the layout used starting 2022 (bottom).
- The Finnish Grand Prix scheduled for July was cancelled in May due to incomplete homologation works and the risks associated with the geopolitical situation in the region surrounding the Russian invasion of Ukraine.
- The Austrian Grand Prix used a new layout of the Red Bull Ring, wherein a chicane was added to the previous fast slight-left hander of turn 2. This was done to improve the overall safety of the track by greatly minimizing the speed the riders take the turn. The final configuration was chosen among 15 proposals, with the track being 30 meters longer than the previous configurations.

== Results and standings ==
=== Grands Prix ===
Round	Grand Prix	Pole position	Fastest lap	Winning rider	Winning team	Report
1	(Spain) Spanish motorcycle Grand Prix	(Spain) Miquel Pons	(Spain) Héctor Garzó	(Brazil) Eric Granado	(Monaco) LCR E-Team	Report
1	(Spain) Spanish motorcycle Grand Prix	(Spain) Miquel Pons	(Brazil) Eric Granado	(Brazil) Eric Granado	(Monaco) LCR E-Team	Report
2	(France) French motorcycle Grand Prix	(Italy) Mattia Casadei	(Italy) Mattia Casadei	(Italy) Mattia Casadei	(Spain) Pons Racing 40	Report
2	(France) French motorcycle Grand Prix	(Italy) Mattia Casadei	(Italy) Andrea Mantovani	(Switzerland) Dominique Aegerter	(Germany) Dynavolt Intact GP	Report
3	(Italy) Italian motorcycle Grand Prix	(Switzerland) Dominique Aegerter	(Switzerland) Dominique Aegerter	(Switzerland) Dominique Aegerter	(Germany) Dynavolt Intact GP	Report
3	(Italy) Italian motorcycle Grand Prix	(Switzerland) Dominique Aegerter	(Switzerland) Dominique Aegerter	(Italy) Matteo Ferrari	(Italy) Felo Gresini MotoE	Report
4	(Netherlands) Dutch TT	(Switzerland) Dominique Aegerter	(Brazil) Eric Granado	(Switzerland) Dominique Aegerter	(Germany) Dynavolt Intact GP	Report
4	(Netherlands) Dutch TT	(Switzerland) Dominique Aegerter	(Brazil) Eric Granado	(Brazil) Eric Granado	(Monaco) LCR E-Team	Report
5	(Austria) Austrian motorcycle Grand Prix	(Brazil) Eric Granado	(Brazil) Eric Granado	(Brazil) Eric Granado	(Monaco) LCR E-Team	Report
5	(Austria) Austrian motorcycle Grand Prix	(Brazil) Eric Granado	(Spain) Miquel Pons	(Brazil) Eric Granado	(Monaco) LCR E-Team	Report
6	San Marino and Rimini Riviera motorcycle Grand Prix	(Switzerland) Dominique Aegerter	(Italy) Matteo Ferrari	(Italy) Mattia Casadei	(Spain) Pons Racing 40	Report
6	San Marino and Rimini Riviera motorcycle Grand Prix	(Switzerland) Dominique Aegerter	(Italy) Matteo Ferrari	(Italy) Matteo Ferrari	(Italy) Felo Gresini MotoE	Report

=== Cup standings ===
Scoring system

Points were awarded to the top fifteen finishers. A rider had to finish the race to earn points.

Position	1st	2nd	3rd	4th	5th	6th	7th	8th	9th	10th	11th	12th	13th	14th	15th
Points	25	20	16	13	11	10	9	8	7	6	5	4	3	2	1

Pos.	Rider	SPA (Spain)		FRA (France)		ITA (Italy)		NED^{‡} (Netherlands)		AUT (Austria)		RSM (San Marino)		Pts
1	(Switzerland) Dominique Aegerter	2	4	2	1	1^{P F}	2^{P F}	1^{P}	2^{P}	2	3	2^{P}	4^{P}	227
2	(Brazil) Eric Granado	1	1^{F}	7	5	3	8	2^{F}	1^{F}	1^{P F}	1^{P}	17	3	192.5
3	(Italy) Matteo Ferrari	3	6	4	7	2	1	4	4	14	9	3^{F}	1^{F}	162.5
4	(Italy) Mattia Casadei	17	3	1^{P F}	2^{P}	4	Ret	3	3	Ret	4	1	2	156
5	(Spain) Miquel Pons	8^{P}	2^{P}	6	10	7	3	6	Ret	3	2^{F}	Ret	7	124
6	(Japan) Hikari Okubo	6	5	3	6	11	Ret	13	11	4	7	7	9	95.5
7	(Italy) Niccolò Canepa	11	9	8	3	6	6	7	5	Ret	12	6	6	94.5
8	(Spain) Héctor Garzó	4^{F}	Ret	5	8	9	10	5	10	5	8	10	14	86
9	(Spain) Álex Escrig	7	8	10	12	14	13	14	6	6	5	5	8	79
10	(Italy) Kevin Zannoni	12	13	16	4	8	5	10	9	7	13	11	10	71.5
11	(Spain) Jordi Torres	5	7	Ret	DNS			9	16	8	10	4	5	65
12	(Italy) Kevin Manfredi	13	10	13	16	10	9	11	7	10	11	8	11	58.5
13	(Spain) Marc Alcoba	9	Ret	Ret	9	5	7	Ret	13	12	15	13	13	46.5
14	(Spain) Xavi Forés	14	11	12	13	12	12	12	15	9	DNS	15	15	35.5
15	(Andorra) Xavier Cardelús			11	14	DNS	DNS			13	6	9	12	31
16	(Italy) Andrea Mantovani			9	11^{F}	DSQ	4							25
17	(Spain) María Herrera	15	14	14	15	16	15	15	8	11	14	14	Ret	21
18	(United Kingdom) Bradley Smith							8	17	Ret	DNS	12	16	12
19	(Germany) Lukas Tulovic	10	12											10
20	(Italy) Alessio Finello	Ret	15	15	17	13	14	16	12	DNS	DNS	16	17	9
21	(Italy) Massimo Roccoli					15	11							6
22	(Spain) Unai Orradre							17	14					1
23	(Spain) Yeray Ruiz	16	Ret											0
Pos.	Rider	SPA (Spain)		FRA (France)		ITA (Italy)		NED^{‡} (Netherlands)		AUT (Austria)		RSM (San Marino)		Pts

Race key
Colour	Result
Gold	Winner
Silver	2nd place
Bronze	3rd place
Green	Points finish
Blue	Non-points finish
Blue	Non-classified finish (NC)
Purple	Retired (Ret)
Red	Did not qualify (DNQ)
Black	Disqualified (DSQ)
White	Did not start (DNS)
White	Withdrew (WD)
White	Race cancelled (C)
Blank	Did not practice (DNP)
Blank	Excluded (EX)
Blank	Did not arrive (DNA)
Blank	Did not enter (empty cell)
Annotation	Meaning
P	Pole position
F	Fastest lap
Rider key
Colour	Meaning
Light blue	Rookie rider

- ‡ – Half points were awarded during race 2 of the Dutch TT as less than two-thirds of the scheduled race distance (but at least three full laps) was completed.
