= 2022 Italian motorcycle Grand Prix =

Motorcycle race in Scarperia e San Piero

(Italy) 2022 Italian Grand Prix
Race details
- Race 8 of 20 races in the 2022 Grand Prix motorcycle racing season
- Date: 28–29 May 2022
- Official name: Gran Premio d'Italia Oakley
- Location: Autodromo Internazionale del Mugello; Scarperia e San Piero, Italy
- Course: Permanent racing facility; 5.245 km (3.259 mi)

MotoGP
Pole position
| Rider | (Italy) Fabio Di Giannantonio | Ducati |
| Time | 1:46.156 | |
Fastest lap
| Rider | (Italy) Francesco Bagnaia | Ducati |
| Time | 1:46.588 on lap 5 | |
Podium
| First | (Italy) Francesco Bagnaia | Ducati |
| Second | (France) Fabio Quartararo | Yamaha |
| Third | (Spain) Aleix Espargaró | Aprilia |

Moto2
Pole position
| Rider | (Spain) Arón Canet | Kalex |
| Time | 1:51.121 | |
Fastest lap
| Rider | (Spain) Augusto Fernández | Kalex |
| Time | 1:52.323 on lap 9 | |
Podium
| First | (Spain) Pedro Acosta | Kalex |
| Second | (United States) Joe Roberts | Kalex |
| Third | (Japan) Ai Ogura | Kalex |

Moto3
Pole position
| Rider | (Turkey) Deniz Öncü | KTM |
| Time | 1:56.811 | |
Fastest lap
| Rider | (Italy) Riccardo Rossi | Honda |
| Time | 1:57.234 on lap 9 | |
Podium
| First | (Spain) Sergio García | Gas Gas |
| Second | (Spain) Izan Guevara | Gas Gas |
| Third | (Japan) Tatsuki Suzuki | Honda |

MotoE Race 1
Pole position
| Rider | (Switzerland) Dominique Aegerter | Energica |
| Time | 1:59.205 | |
Fastest lap
| Rider | (Switzerland) Dominique Aegerter | Energica |
| Time | 1:58.939 on lap 5 | |
Podium
| First | (Switzerland) Dominique Aegerter | Energica |
| Second | (Italy) Matteo Ferrari | Energica |
| Third | (Italy) Andrea Mantovani | Energica |

MotoE Race 2
Pole position
| Rider | (Switzerland) Dominique Aegerter | Energica |
| Time | 1:59.205 | |
Fastest lap
| Rider | (Switzerland) Dominique Aegerter | Energica |
| Time | 1:59.068 on lap 6 | |
Podium
| First | (Italy) Matteo Ferrari | Energica |
| Second | (Switzerland) Dominique Aegerter | Energica |
| Third | (Spain) Marc Alcoba | Energica |

The 2022 Italian motorcycle Grand Prix (officially known as the Gran Premio d'Italia Oakley) was the eighth round of the 2022 Grand Prix motorcycle racing season and the third round of the 2022 MotoE World Cup. All races (except MotoE race 1 which was held on 28 May) were held at the Autodromo Internazionale del Mugello in Scarperia e San Piero on 29 May 2022. The Grand Prix saw the retirement of Valentino Rossi's racing number 46 in the MotoGP class.

== Background ==
=== Riders' entries ===
In MotoGP, in addition to the starting riders, there are two riders as wildcards: Lorenzo Savadori with Aprilia Racing for the third time this season after the Grand Prix in Portugal and Spain, and Michele Pirro, at the first with Aruba.it Ducati. In Moto2, Mattia Pasini races as a wildcard for the Gas Gas Aspar Team, while Keminth Kubo returns as a starter to the Yamaha VR46 Master Camp Team after recovering from his injury. In Moto3, David Muñoz makes his debut this season in Boé SKX after he was replaced by Gerard Riu because he had not turned 16 years, the minimum limit to participate in the championship. Alberto Surra returns to racing in the Rivacold Snipers Team after recovering from the injury due to the crash in the Grand Prix of the Americas.

=== MotoGP Championship standings before the race ===
After the French Grand Prix, Fabio Quartararo confirms his leadership in the drivers' standings with 102 points, 4 more than Aleix Espargaró and 8 more than Enea Bastianini (winner at Le Mans). Álex Rins is fourth with 69 points, followed by Jack Miller (who gains six positions in the standings) and Johann Zarco with 62 points. Ducati is first in the constructors' classification with 156 points, with a large margin over the others: Yamaha (106), Aprilia (99), KTM (84) overtaking Suzuki (80), and Honda finishing with 80 points. In the team standings, Aprilia Racing overtakes the Suzuki Ecstar Team in command (131 points the first, 125 points the second), with Monster Energy Yamaha MotoGP third at 121 points, 3 more than Ducati Lenovo Team. Red Bull KTM Factory Racing is fifth with 99 points.

=== Moto2 Championship standings before the race ===
In the riders' classification, Celestino Vietti is first with 108 points, followed by Ai Ogura (92 points), Arón Canet (89 points), Tony Arbolino (70 points) and Augusto Fernández (winner of the previous race, 69 points). The constructors' classification states: Kalex 175 points, Boscoscuro 20 points, MV Agusta 5 points. In the constructors' standings, Idemitsu Honda Team Asia leads with 153 points, with a 12-point lead over the Flexbox HP40. Mooney VR46 Racing Team overtakes Elf Marc VDS Racing Team in third position (108 points the first, 3 less the second), Red Bull KTM Ajo is fifth with 89 points.

=== Moto3 Championship standings before the race ===
Sergio García leads the riders' classification with 112 points, 17 points ahead of Jaumè Masia (winner in France) and Dennis Foggia, 23 points ahead of Izan Guevara and 37 points ahead of Ayumu Sasaki. In the manufacturers' classification, behind the leader Gas Gas (140 points), KTM (123 points) overtakes Honda (116 points). Husqvarna and CFMoto are fourth and fifth with 86 and 71 points respectively. Gas Gas Aspar Team dominates the team classification with 201 points; second is Leopard Racing with 133 points, 10 more than Red Bull KTM Ajo. In fourth position, Sterilgarda Husqvarna Max overtakes CFMoto Racing Prüstel GP by only one point (90 vs 89 points).

=== MotoE Cup standings before the race ===
Dominique Aegerter overtakes Eric Granado at the head of the standings: the Swiss rider has 78 points, while the Brazilian rider has 70 points. Third is Mattia Casadei with 61 points, followed by Matteo Ferrari and Hikari Okubo with 48 and 47 points respectively.

== Free practice ==
=== MotoGP ===
The top ten riders (written in bold) qualified in Q2.

Fastest session lap

| Pos. | No. | Biker | Constructor | Free practice times | | |
| Pos. | No. | Biker | Constructor | FP1 | FP2 | FP3 |
|---|---|---|---|---|---|---|
| 1 | 63 | **(Italy) Francesco Bagnaia** | **Ducati** | 1:47.070 | 1:45.940 | 1:45.393 |
| 2 | 41 | **(Spain) Aleix Espargaró** | **Aprilia** | 1:47.070 | 1:45.891 | 1:45.669 |
| 3 | 10 | **(Italy) Luca Marini** | **Ducati** | 1:47.383 | 1:46.362 | 1:45.762 |
| 4 | 5 | **(France) Johann Zarco** | **Ducati** | 1:47.367 | 1:46.349 | 1:45.767 |
| 5 | 72 | **(Italy) Marco Bezzecchi** | **Ducati** | 1:47.584 | 1:46.473 | 1:45.853 |
| 6 | 23 | **(Italy) Enea Bastianini** | **Ducati** | 1:47.186 | 1:46.395 | 1:45.860 |
| 7 | 89 | **(Spain) Jorge Martín** | **Ducati** | 1:47.903 | 1:46.629 | 1:45.879 |
| 8 | 44 | **(Spain) Pol Espargaró** | **Honda** | 1:47.367 | 1:46.618 | 1:45.880 |
| 9 | 30 | **(Japan) Takaaki Nakagami** | **Honda** | 1:46.662 | 1:46.852 | 1:45.999 |
| 10 | 20 | **(France) Fabio Quartararo** | **Yamaha** | 1:47.393 | 1:46.519 | 1:46.032 |
| 11 | 12 | (Spain) Maverick Viñales | Aprilia | 1:47.191 | 1:47.053 | 1:46.060 |
| 12 | 42 | (Spain) Álex Rins | Suzuki | 1:47.071 | 1:46.663 | 1:46.064 |
| 13 | 49 | (Italy) Fabio Di Giannantonio | Ducati | 1:48.335 | 1:46.915 | 1:46.116 |
| 14 | 88 | (Portugal) Miguel Oliveira | KTM | 1:47.820 | 1:46.818 | 1:46.154 |
| 15 | 43 | (Australia) Jack Miller | Ducati | 1:47.315 | 1:46.313 | 1:46.169 |
| 16 | 36 | (Spain) Joan Mir | Suzuki | 1:47.658 | 1:47.269 | 1:46.337 |
| 17 | 73 | (Spain) Álex Márquez | Honda | 1:47.562 | 1:47.151 | 1:46.363 |
| 18 | 33 | (South Africa) Brad Binder | KTM | 1:47.746 | 1:46.439 | 1:46.500 |
| 19 | 21 | (Italy) Franco Morbidelli | Yamaha | 1:47.727 | 1:47.468 | 1:46.483 |
| 20 | 51 | (Italy) Michele Pirro | Ducati | 1:47.432 | 1:47.726 | 1:46.557 |
| 21 | 93 | (Spain) Marc Márquez | Honda | 1:47.875 | 1:46.658 | 1:46.577 |
| 22 | 25 | (Spain) Raúl Fernández | KTM | 1:48.911 | 1:47.998 | 1:46.739 |
| 23 | 87 | (Australia) Remy Gardner | KTM | 1:48.960 | 1:47.684 | 1:46.939 |
| 24 | 40 | (South Africa) Darryn Binder | Yamaha | 1:48.910 | 1:47.687 | 1:46.963 |
| 25 | 4 | (Italy) Andrea Dovizioso | Yamaha | 1:48.078 | 1:47.583 | 1:47.023 |
| 26 | 32 | (Italy) Lorenzo Savadori | Aprilia | 1:48.253 | 1:48.088 | 1:47.046 |
OFFICIAL MOTOGP COMBINED FREE PRACTICE TIMES REPORT

=== Moto2 ===
The top fourteen riders (written in bold) qualified in Q2.

Fastest session lap

| Pos. | No. | Biker | Constructor | Free practice times | | |
| Pos. | No. | Biker | Constructor | FP1 | FP2 | FP3 |
|---|---|---|---|---|---|---|
| 1 | 40 | **(Spain) Arón Canet** | **Kalex** | 1:52.346 | 1:52.750 | **1:51.761** |
| 2 | 51 | **(Spain) Pedro Acosta** | **Kalex** | 1:52.361 | 1:52.407 | **1:51.820** |
| 3 | 37 | **(Spain) Augusto Fernández** | **Kalex** | 1:52.282 | 1:52.371 | **1:51.828** |
| 4 | 22 | **(United Kingdom)** **Sam Lowes** | **Kalex** | 1:52.550 | 1:52.833 | **1:51.864** |
| 5 | 19 | (Italy) **Lorenzo Dalla Porta** | **Kalex** | 1:53.565 | 1:53.505 | **1:51.884** |
| 6 | 7 | (Belgium) **Barry Baltus** | **Kalex** | 1:53.460 | 1:53.098 | **1:51.904** |
| 7 | 13 | (Italy) **Celestino Vietti** | **Kalex** | 1:52.802 | 1:53.055 | **1:51.909** |
| 8 | 96 | (United Kingdom) **Jake Dixon** | **Kalex** | **1:51.966** | 1:53.459 | 1:52.058 |
| 9 | 64 | (Netherlands) **Bo Bendsneyder** | **Kalex** | 1:53.291 | 1:52.973 | **1:52.019** |
| 10 | 75 | **(Spain) Albert Arenas** | **Kalex** | 1:53.699 | 1:52.481 | **1:52.062** |
| 11 | 79 | (Japan) **Ai Ogura** | **Kalex** | 1:52.968 | 1:53.285 | **1:52.076** |
| 12 | 6 | **(United States) Cameron Beaubier** | **Kalex** | **1:52.135** | 1:53.001 | 1:53.081 |
| 13 | 9 | (Spain) **Jorge Navarro** | **Kalex** | 1:53.505 | 1:53.207 | **1:52.090** |
| 14 | 16 | (United States) **Joe Roberts** | **Kalex** | 1:52.972 | 1:52.796 | **1:52.104** |
| 15 | 14 | (Italy) Tony Arbolino | Kalex | 1:53.029 | 1:52.653 | **1:52.106** |
| 16 | 23 | (Germany) Marcel Schrötter | Kalex | 1:53.452 | 1:53.376 | **1:52.109** |
| 17 | 11 | (Italy) Mattia Pasini | Kalex | 1:52.950 | 1:53.920 | **1:52.145** |
| 18 | 35 | (Thailand) Somkiat Chantra | Kalex | 1:52.899 | 1:52.350 | **1:52.160** |
| 19 | 21 | (Spain) Alonso López | Boscoscuro | 1:52.906 | 1:52.884 | **1:52.244** |
| 20 | 54 | (Spain) Fermín Aldeguer | Boscoscuro | 1:53.328 | 1:52.879 | **1:52.291** |
| 21 | 12 | (Czech Republic) Filip Salač | Kalex | 1:52.470 | 1:53.963 | **1:52.364** |
| 22 | 18 | (Spain) Manuel González | Kalex | 1:53.040 | 1:52.814 | **1:52.375** |
| 23 | 84 | (Netherlands) Zonta van den Goorbergh | Kalex | 1:54.848 | 1:54.012 | **1:52.456** |
| 24 | 52 | (Spain) Jeremy Alcoba | Kalex | 1:53.928 | 1:53.545 | **1:52.491** |
| 25 | 42 | (Spain) Marcos Rámirez | MV Agusta | 1:53.712 | 1:53.317 | **1:52.554** |
| 26 | 28 | (Italy) Niccolò Antonelli | Kalex | 1:52.655 | 1:53.128 | **1:52.575** |
| 27 | 61 | (Italy) Alessandro Zaccone | Kalex | 1:55.082 | 1:53.763 | **1:52.655** |
| 28 | 2 | (Argentina) Gabriel Rodrigo | Kalex | **1:53.023** | 1:53.649 | 1:53.800 |
| 29 | 24 | (Italy) Simone Corsi | MV Agusta | 1:53.878 | 1:53.536 | **1.53.204** |
| 30 | 4 | (United States) Sean Dylan Kelly | Kalex | 1:56.652 | 1:55.892 | **1:53.599** |
| 31 | 81 | (Thailand) Keminth Kubo | Kalex | 1:56.273 | 1:55.000 | **1:54.109** |
OFFICIAL MOTO2 COMBINED FREE PRACTICE TIMES REPORT

=== Moto3 ===
The top fourteen riders (written in bold) qualified in Q2.

Fastest session lap

| Pos. | No. | Biker | Constructor | Free practice times | | |
| Pos. | No. | Biker | Constructor | FP1 | FP2 | FP3 |
|---|---|---|---|---|---|---|
| 1 | 7 | **(Italy) Dennis Foggia** | **Honda** | 1:56.916 | 1:57.820 | **1:56.576** |
| 2 | 96 | **(Spain) Daniel Holgado** | **KTM** | 1:58.285 | 1:59.222 | **1:56.793** |
| 3 | 16 | **(Italy) Andrea Migno** | **Honda** | 1:58.305 | 1:58.104 | **1:56.902** |
| 4 | 11 | **(Spain) Sergio García** | **Gas Gas** | 1:58.624 | 1:57.921 | **1:56.966** |
| 5 | 10 | (Brazil) **Diogo Moreira** | **KTM** | 1:57.850 | 1:59.574 | **1.57.007** |
| 6 | 28 | **(Spain) Izan Guevara** | **Gas Gas** | 1:58.111 | 1:58.354 | **1:57.076** |
| 7 | 54 | (Italy) **Riccardo Rossi** | **Honda** | 1:58.059 | 1:58.964 | **1:57.110** |
| 8 | 5 | **(Spain) Jaume Masià** | **KTM** | 1:58.307 | **1:57.134** | 1:57.670 |
| 9 | 17 | (United Kingdom) **John McPhee** | **Husqvarna** | 1:57.283 | 1:58.471 | **1:57.139** |
| 10 | 24 | **(Japan) Tatsuki Suzuki** | **Honda** | 1:57.905 | 1:57.775 | **1:57.194** |
| 11 | 53 | (Turkey) **Deniz Öncü** | **KTM** | 1:58.737 | 1:58.108 | **1.57.218** |
| 12 | 19 | (United Kingdom) **Scott Ogden** | **Honda** | 1:58.901 | 1:58.405 | **1:57.310** |
| 13 | 82 | (Italy) **Stefano Nepa** | **KTM** | 1:58.816 | 1:59.410 | **1:57.435** |
| 14 | 99 | **(Spain)** **Carlos Tatay** | **CFMoto** | 1:58.445 | 1:58.733 | **1:57.488** |
| 15 | 23 | (Italy) Elia Bartolini | KTM | 1:58.440 | 1:59.225 | **1:57.713** |
| 16 | 20 | (France) Lorenzo Fellon | Honda | 1:59.800 | 1:58.406 | **1:57.726** |
| 17 | 6 | (Japan) Ryusei Yamanaka | KTM | 1:58.782 | 1:58.840 | **1:57.734** |
| 18 | 67 | (Italy) Alberto Surra | Honda | 1:58.805 | 1:59.014 | **1:57.856** |
| 19 | 18 | (Italy) Matteo Bertelle | KTM | 1:58.641 | **1:58.004** | 1:58.145 |
| 20 | 31 | (Spain) Adrián Fernández | KTM | 1:58.857 | 1:58.976 | **1:58.083** |
| 21 | 64 | (Indonesia) Mario Aji | Honda | **1:58.153** | 1:59.708 | 1:58.924 |
| 22 | 27 | (Japan) Kaito Toba | KTM | 1:59.025 | 1:59.293 | **1:58.197** |
| 23 | 48 | (Spain) Iván Ortolá | KTM | 2:00.704 | 1:59.523 | **1:58.344** |
| 24 | 66 | (Australia) Joel Kelso | KTM | 1:58.631 | **1:58.472** | 1:58.840 |
| 25 | 44 | (Spain) David Muñoz | KTM | 2:00.444 | 1:59.793 | **1:58.673** |
| 26 | 72 | (Japan) Taiyo Furusato | Honda | 2:00.230 | 1:59.969 | **1:59.053** |
| 27 | 43 | (Spain) Xavier Artigas | CFMoto | 2:00.205 | **1:59.092** | 1:59.323 |
| 28 | 70 | (United Kingdom) Joshua Whatley | Honda | 2:01.444 | 2:01.797 | **2:00.238** |
| 29 | 22 | (Spain) Ana Carrasco | KTM | 2:02.606 | 2:02.544 | **2:01.762** |
OFFICIAL MOTO3 COMBINED FREE PRACTICE TIMES REPORT

=== MotoE ===
In the first session, Dominique Aegerter was the fastest, ahead of Eric Granado and Kevin Zannoni. In the second, Aegerter once again was fastest in free practice ahead of Granado and Miquel Pons.

The top eight riders (written in bold) qualified in Q2.

Fastest session lap

| Pos. | No. | Biker | Constructor | Free practice times | |
| Pos. | No. | Biker | Constructor | FP1 | FP2 |
|---|---|---|---|---|---|
| 1 | 77 | **(Switzerland) Dominique Aegerter** | **Energica** | 2:00.590 | 1:59.739 |
| 2 | 51 | **(Brazil) Eric Granado** | **Energica** | 2:00.998 | 1:59.832 |
| 3 | 71 | **(Spain) Miquel Pons** | **Energica** | 2:01.723 | 2:00.057 |
| 4 | 7 | **(Italy) Niccolò Canepa** | **Energica** | 2:01.404 | 2:00.078 |
| 5 | 9 | **(Italy) Andrea Mantovani** | **Energica** | 2:01.160 | 2:00.082 |
| 6 | 21 | **(Italy) Kevin Zannoni** | **Energica** | 2:01.034 | 2:00.177 |
| 7 | 27 | **(Italy) Matteo Casadei** | **Energica** | 2:01.053 | 2:00.218 |
| 8 | 11 | **(Italy) Matteo Ferrari** | **Energica** | 2:01.408 | 2:00.306 |
| 9 | 70 | (Spain) Marc Alcoba | Energica | 2:01.853 | 2:00.308 |
| 10 | 18 | (Andorra) Xavi Cardelús | Energica | 2:02.171 | 2:00.318 |
| 11 | 34 | (Italy) Kevin Manfredi | Energica | 2:01.678 | 2:00.456 |
| 12 | 4 | (Spain) Héctor Garzó | Energica | 2:01.217 | 2:00.522 |
| 13 | 12 | (Spain) Xavi Forés | Energica | 2:02.147 | 2:00.603 |
| 14 | 78 | (Japan) Hikari Okubo | Energica | 2:02.450 | 2:00.984 |
| 15 | 55 | (Italy) Massimo Roccoli | Energica | 2:02.675 | 2:01.353 |
| 16 | 17 | (Spain) Álex Escrig | Energica | 2:02.766 | 2:01.361 |
| 17 | 72 | (Italy) Alessio Finello | Energica | 2:02.550 | 2:01.789 |
| 18 | 6 | (Spain) María Herrera | Energica | 2:03.846 | 2:01.829 |
OFFICIAL MOTOE COMBINED FREE PRACTICE TIMES REPORT

== Qualifying ==
=== MotoGP ===
Fastest session lap

| Pos. | No. | Biker | Constructor | Qualifying times | | Final grid | Row |
| Pos. | No. | Biker | Constructor | Q1 | Q2 | Final grid | Row |
|---|---|---|---|---|---|---|---|
| 1 | 49 | (Italy) Fabio Di Giannantonio | Ducati | 1:47.219 | 1:46.156 | 1 | 1 |
| 2 | 72 | (Italy) Marco Bezzecchi | Ducati | Qualified in Q2 | 1:46.244 | 2 | 1 |
| 3 | 10 | (Italy) Luca Marini | Ducati | Qualified in Q2 | 1:46.327 | 3 | 1 |
| 4 | 5 | (France) Johann Zarco | Ducati | Qualified in Q2 | 1:46.383 | 4 | 2 |
| 5 | 63 | (Italy) Francesco Bagnaia | Ducati | Qualified in Q2 | 1:46.471 | 5 | 2 |
| 6 | 20 | (France) Fabio Quartararo | Yamaha | Qualified in Q2 | 1:46.506 | 6 | 2 |
| 7 | 41 | (Spain) Aleix Espargaró | Aprilia | Qualified in Q2 | 1:46.507 | 7 | 3 |
| 8 | 30 | (Japan) Takaaki Nakagami | Honda | Qualified in Q2 | 1:46.561 | 8 | 3 |
| 9 | 44 | (Spain) Pol Espargaró | Honda | Qualified in Q2 | 1:46.667 | 9 | 3 |
| 10 | 23 | (Italy) Enea Bastianini | Ducati | Qualified in Q2 | 1:46.670 | 10 | 4 |
| 11 | 89 | (Spain) Jorge Martín | Ducati | Qualified in Q2 | 1:47.223 | 14^{1} | 5 |
| 12 | 93 | (Spain) Marc Márquez | Honda | 1:47.294 | 1:47.468 | 11 | 4 |
| 13 | 43 | (Australia) Jack Miller | Ducati | 1:47.621 | N/A | 12 | 4 |
| 14 | 51 | (Italy) Michele Pirro | Ducati | 1:48.209 | N/A | 13 | 5 |
| 15 | 88 | (Portugal) Miguel Oliveira | KTM | 1:48.231 | N/A | 15 | 5 |
| 16 | 33 | (South Africa) Brad Binder | KTM | 1:48.255 | N/A | 16 | 6 |
| 17 | 36 | (Spain) Joan Mir | Suzuki | 1:48.732 | N/A | 17 | 6 |
| 18 | 73 | (Spain) Álex Márquez | Honda | 1:48.846 | N/A | 18 | 6 |
| 19 | 87 | (Australia) Remy Gardner | KTM | 1:48.907 | N/A | 19 | 7 |
| 20 | 40 | (South Africa) Darryn Binder | Yamaha | 1:49.471 | N/A | 20 | 7 |
| 21 | 42 | (Spain) Álex Rins | Suzuki | 1:50.266 | N/A | 21 | 7 |
| 22 | 32 | (Italy) Lorenzo Savadori | Aprilia | 1:50.270 | N/A | 22 | 8 |
| 23 | 21 | (Italy) Franco Morbidelli | Yamaha | 1:55.369 | N/A | 23 | 8 |
| 24 | 12 | (Spain) Maverick Viñales | Aprilia | 1:56.479 | N/A | 24 | 8 |
| 25 | 25 | (Spain) Raúl Fernández | KTM | 1:57.106 | N/A | 25 | 9 |
| 26 | 04 | (Italy) Andrea Dovizioso | Yamaha | 1:57.671 | N/A | 26 | 9 |
OFFICIAL MOTOGP QUALIFYING RESULTS

Notes

- ^1 – Jorge Martín has been given a 3-place grid penalty for being slow on the line and disturbing another rider during FP3.

=== Moto2 ===
Fastest session lap

| Pos. | No. | Biker | Constructor | Qualifying times | | Final grid | Row |
| Pos. | No. | Biker | Constructor | Q1 | Q2 | Final grid | Row |
|---|---|---|---|---|---|---|---|
| 1 | 40 | (Spain) Arón Canet | Kalex | Qualified in Q2 | 1:51:121 | 1 | 1 |
| 2 | 51 | (Spain) Pedro Acosta | Kalex | Qualified in Q2 | 1:51.246 | 2 | 1 |
| 3 | 22 | (United Kingdom) Sam Lowes | Kalex | Qualified in Q2 | 1:51.279 | 3 | 1 |
| 4 | 13 | (Italy) Celestino Vietti | Kalex | Qualified in Q2 | 1:51.381 | 4 | 2 |
| 5 | 11 | (Italy) Mattia Pasini | Kalex | 1:51.844 | 1:51.465 | 5 | 2 |
| 6 | 79 | (Japan) Ai Ogura | Kalex | Qualified in Q2 | 1:51.478 | 6 | 2 |
| 7 | 16 | (United States) Joe Roberts | Kalex | Qualified in Q2 | 1:51.552 | 7 | '3 |
| 8 | 14 | (Italy) Tony Arbolino | Kalex | 1.51.861 | 1:51.566 | 8 | '3 |
| 9 | 96 | (United Kingdom) Jake Dixon | Kalex | Qualified in Q2 | 1:51.631 | 9 | '3 |
| 10 | 7 | (Belgium) Barry Baltus | Kalex | Qualified in Q2 | 1:51.754 | 10 | 4 |
| 11 | 19 | (Italy) Lorenzo Dalla Porta | Kalex | Qualified in Q2 | 1:51.760 | 11 | 4 |
| 12 | 9 | (Spain) Jorge Navarro | Kalex | Qualified in Q2 | 1:51.789 | 12 | 4 |
| 13 | 75 | (Spain) Albert Arenas | Kalex | Qualified in Q2 | 1:51.849 | 13 | 5 |
| 14 | 37 | (Spain) Augusto Fernández | Kalex | Qualified in Q2 | 1:51.940 | 14 | 5 |
| 15 | 54 | (Spain) Fermín Aldeguer | Boscoscuro | 1:51.916 | 1:51.954 | 15 | 5 |
| 16 | 42 | (Spain) Marcos Ramírez | MV Agusta | 1:51.980 | 1:52.045 | 16 | 6 |
| 17 | 64 | (Netherlands) Bo Bendsneyder | Kalex | Qualified in Q2 | 1:52.056 | 17 | 6 |
| 18 | 6 | (United States) Cameron Beaubier | Kalex | Qualified in Q2 | 1:52.656 | 18 | 6 |
| 19 | 21 | (Italy) Alonso López | Boscoscuro | 1:52.006 | N/A | 19 | 7 |
| 20 | 23 | (Germany) Marcel Schrötter | Kalex | 1:52.066 | N/A | 20 | 7 |
| 21 | 52 | (Spain) Jeremy Alcoba | Kalex | 1:52.139 | N/A | 21 | 7 |
| 22 | 61 | (Italy) Alessandro Zaccone | Kalex | 1:52.438 | N/A | 22 | 8 |
| 23 | 12 | (Czech Republic) Filip Salač | Kalex | 1:52.451 | N/A | 23 | 8 |
| 24 | 18 | (Thailand) Somkiat Chantra | Kalex | 1:52.522 | N/A | 24 | 8 |
| 25 | 16 | (Italy) Simone Corsi | MV Agusta | 1:52.746 | N/A | 25 | 9 |
| 26 | 84 | (Netherlands) Zonta van den Goorbergh | Kalex | 1:52.755 | N/A | 26 | 9 |
| 27 | 52 | (Spain) Manuel González | Kalex | 1:53.036 | N/A | 27 | 9 |
| 28 | 28 | (Italy) Niccolò Antonelli | Kalex | 1:53.115 | N/A | 28 | 10 |
| 29 | 2 | (Argentina) Gabriel Rodrigo | Kalex | 1:53.153 | N/A | Did not start | 10 |
| 30 | 81 | (Thailand) Keminth Kubo | Kalex | 1:53.763 | N/A | 29 | 10 |
| 31 | 4 | (United States) Sean Dylan Kelly | Kalex | 1:54.218 | N/A | 30 | 10 |
OFFICIAL MOTO2 QUALIFYING RESULTS

=== Moto3 ===
Fastest session lap

| Pos. | No. | Biker | Constructor | Qualifying times | | Final grid | Row |
| Pos. | No. | Biker | Constructor | Q1 | Q2 | Final grid | Row |
|---|---|---|---|---|---|---|---|
| 1 | 53 | (Turkey) Deniz Öncü | KTM | Qualified in Q2 | 1:56.811 | 1 | 1 |
| 2 | 96 | (Spain) Daniel Holgado | KTM | Qualified in Q2 | 1:56.908 | 2 | 1 |
| 3 | 7 | (Italy) Dennis Foggia | Honda | Qualified in Q2 | 1:57.094 | 3 | 1 |
| 4 | 11 | (Spain) Sergio García | Gas Gas | Qualified in Q2 | 1:57.232 | 4 | 2 |
| 5 | 28 | (Spain) Izan Guevara | Gas Gas | Qualified in Q2 | 1:57.236 | 5 | 2 |
| 6 | 17 | (United Kingdom) John McPhee | Husqvarna | Qualified in Q2 | 1:57.299 | 6 | 2 |
| 7 | 10 | (Brazil) Diogo Moreira | KTM | Qualified in Q2 | 1:57.405 | 7 | 3 |
| 8 | 54 | (Italy) Riccardo Rossi | Honda | Qualified in Q2 | 1:57.450 | 8 | 3 |
| 9 | 6 | (Japan) Ryusei Yamanaka | KTM | 1:57:595 | 1:57.513 | 9 | 3 |
| 10 | 5 | (Spain) Jaume Masià | KTM | Qualified in Q2 | 1:57.532 | 10 | 4 |
| 11 | 24 | (Japan) Tatsuki Suzuki | Honda | Qualified in Q2 | 1:57.553 | 11 | 4 |
| 12 | 20 | (France) Lorenzo Fellon | Honda | 1:58.463 | 1:57.702 | 12 | 4 |
| 13 | 18 | (Italy) Matteo Bertelle | KTM | 1:58.158 | 1:57.794 | 13 | 5 |
| 14 | 19 | (United Kingdom) Scott Ogden | honda | Qualified in Q2 | 1:57.958 | 14 | 5 |
| 15 | 44 | (Spain) David Muñoz | KTM | 1:58.471 | 1:58.089 | 15 | 5 |
| 16 | 16 | (Italy) Andrea Migno | Honda | Qualified in Q2 | 1:58.188 | 16 | 6 |
| 17 | 99 | (Spain) Carlos Tatay | CFMoto | Qualified in Q2 | 1:58.189 | 17 | 6 |
| 18 | 82 | (Italy) Stefano Nepa | KTM | Qualified in Q2 | 1:58.466 | 18 | 6 |
| 19 | 31 | (Spain) Adrián Fernández | KTM | 1:58.645 | N/A | 19 | 7 |
| 20 | 66 | (Australia) Joel Kelso | KTM | 1:58.804 | N/A | 20 | 7 |
| 21 | 48 | (Spain) Iván Ortolá | KTM | 1:58.832 | N/A | 21 | 7 |
| 22 | 72 | (Japan) Taiyo Furusato | Honda | 1:59.009 | N/A | 22 | 8 |
| 23 | 64 | (Indonesia) Mario Aji | Honda | 1:59.018 | N/A | 23 | 8 |
| 24 | 23 | (Italy) Elia Bartolini | KTM | 1:59.021 | N/A | 24 | 8 |
| 25 | 27 | (Japan) Kaito Toba | KTM | 1:59.133 | N/A | 25 | 9 |
| 26 | 43 | (Spain) Xavier Artigas | CFMoto | 1:59.185 | N/A | 26 | 9 |
| 27 | 70 | (Spain) Joshua Whatley | Honda | 1:59.430 | N/A | 27 | 9 |
| 28 | 22 | (Spain) Ana Carrasco | KTM | 2:00.488 | N/A | 28 | 10 |
| NC | 67 | (Italy) Alberto Surra | Honda | No time set | N/A | Did not start | |
| NC | 71 | (Japan) Ayumu Sasaki | Husqvarna | No time set | N/A | Did not start | |
OFFICIAL MOTO3 QUALIFYING RESULTS

=== MotoE ===
Fastest session lap

| Pos. | No. | Biker | Constructor | Qualifying times | | Final grid | Row |
| Pos. | No. | Biker | Constructor | Q1 | Q2 | Final grid | Row |
|---|---|---|---|---|---|---|---|
| 1 | 77 | (Switzerland) Dominique Aegerter | Energica | Qualified in Q2 | 1:59.205 | 1 | 1 |
| 2 | 21 | (Italy) Kevin Zannoni | Energica | Qualified in Q2 | 1:59.473 | 2 | 1 |
| 3 | 27 | (Italy) Mattia Casadei | Energica | Qualified in Q2 | 1:59.535 | 3 | 1 |
| 4 | 51 | (Brazil) Eric Granado | Energica | Qualified in Q2 | 1:59.537 | 4 | 2 |
| 5 | 11 | (Italy) Matteo Ferrari | Energica | Qualified in Q2 | 1:59.602 | 5 | 2 |
| 6 | 34 | (Italy) Kevin Manfredi | Energica | 2:00.328 | 1:59.707 | 6 | 2 |
| 7 | 7 | (Italy) Niccolò Canepa | Energica | Qualified in Q2 | 2:00.077 | 7 | 3 |
| 8 | 9 | (Italy) Andrea Mantovani | Energica | Qualified in Q2 | 2:00.233 | 8 | 3 |
| 9 | 71 | (Spain) Miquel Pons | Energica | Qualified in Q2 | 2:00.754 | 9 | 3 |
| 10 | 70 | (Spain) Marc Alcoba | Energica | 1:59.805 | 2:02.778 | 10 | 4 |
| 11 | 78 | (Japan) Hikari Okubo | Energica | 2.00.645 | N/A | 11 | 4 |
| 12 | 4 | (Spain) Héctor Garzó | Energica | 2:00.768 | N/A | 12 | 4 |
| 13 | 18 | (Andorra) Xavi Cardelús | Energica | 2:00.779 | N/A | 13 | 5 |
| 14 | 72 | (Italy) Alessio Finello | Energica | 2:01.108 | N/A | 14 | 5 |
| 15 | 55 | (Italy) Massimo Roccoli | Energica | 2:01.144 | N/A | 15 | 5 |
| 16 | 12 | (Spain) Xavi Forés | Energica | 2:01.181 | N/A | 16 | 6 |
| 17 | 6 | (Spain) María Herrera | Energica | 2:01.531 | N/A | 17 | 6 |
| 18 | 17 | (Spain) Álex Escrig | Energica | 2:02.016 | N/A | 18 | 6 |
OFFICIAL MOTOE Starting Grid

== Race ==
=== MotoGP ===
| Pos. | No. | Biker | Team | Constructor | Laps | Time/Retired | Grid | Points |
|---|---|---|---|---|---|---|---|---|
| 1 | 63 | (Italy) Francesco Bagnaia | Ducati Lenovo Team | Ducati | 23 | 41:18.923 | 5 | 25 |
| 2 | 20 | (France) Fabio Quartararo | Monster Energy Yamaha MotoGP | Yamaha | 23 | +0.635 | 6 | 20 |
| 3 | 41 | (Spain) Aleix Espargaró | Aprilia Racing | Aprilia | 23 | +1.983 | 7 | 16 |
| 4 | 5 | (France) Johann Zarco | Prima Pramac Racing | Ducati | 23 | +2.590 | 4 | 13 |
| 5 | 72 | (Italy) Marco Bezzecchi | Mooney VR46 Racing Team | Ducati | 23 | +3.067 | 2 | 11 |
| 6 | 10 | (Italy) Luca Marini | Mooney VR46 Racing Team | Ducati | 23 | +3.875 | 3 | 10 |
| 7 | 33 | (South Africa) Brad Binder | Red Bull KTM Factory Racing | KTM | 23 | +4.067 | 16 | 9 |
| 8 | 30 | (Japan) Takaaki Nakagami | LCR Honda Idemitsu | Honda | 23 | +10.944 | 8 | 8 |
| 9 | 88 | (Portugal) Miguel Oliveira | Red Bull KTM Factory Racing | KTM | 23 | +11.256 | 15 | 7 |
| 10 | 93 | (Spain) Marc Márquez | Repsol Honda Team | Honda | 23 | +11.800 | 11 | 6 |
| 11 | 49 | (Italy) Fabio Di Giannantonio | Gresini Racing MotoGP | Ducati | 23 | +12.916 | 1 | 5 |
| 12 | 12 | (Spain) Maverick Viñales | Aprilia Racing | Aprilia | 23 | +12.917 | 24 | 4 |
| 13 | 89 | (Spain) Jorge Martín | Prima Pramac Racing | Ducati | 23 | +17.240 | 14 | 3 |
| 14 | 73 | (Spain) Álex Márquez | LCR Honda Castrol | Honda | 23 | +17.568 | 18 | 2 |
| 15 | 43 | (Australia) Jack Miller | Ducati Lenovo Team | Ducati | 23 | +17.687 | 12 | 1 |
| 16 | 40 | (South Africa) Darryn Binder | WithU Yamaha RNF MotoGP Team | Yamaha | 23 | +20.265 | 20 | |
| 17 | 21 | (Italy) Franco Morbidelli | Monster Energy Yamaha MotoGP | Yamaha | 23 | +20.296 | 23 | |
| 18 | 51 | (Italy) Michele Pirro | Aruba.it Racing | Ducati | 23 | +21.305 | 13 | |
| 19 | 87 | (Australia) Remy Gardner | Tech3 KTM Factory Racing | KTM | 23 | +30.548 | 19 | |
| 20 | 4 | (Italy) Andrea Dovizioso | WithU Yamaha RNF MotoGP Team | Yamaha | 23 | +31.011 | 26 | |
| 21 | 25 | (Spain) Raúl Fernández | Tech3 KTM Factory Racing | KTM | 23 | +42.723 | 25 | |
| 22 | 32 | (Italy) Lorenzo Savadori | Aprilia Racing | Aprilia | 22 | +1 lap | 22 | |
| Ret | 23 | (Italy) Enea Bastianini | Gresini Racing MotoGP | Ducati | 13 | Accident | 10 | |
| Ret | 36 | (Spain) Joan Mir | Team Suzuki Ecstar | Suzuki | 7 | Accident | 17 | |
| Ret | 42 | (Spain) Álex Rins | Team Suzuki Ecstar | Suzuki | 7 | Accident | 21 | |
| Ret | 44 | (Spain) Pol Espargaró | Repsol Honda Team | Honda | 4 | Accident | 9 | |
Fastest lap: (Italy) Francesco Bagnaia (Ducati) – 1:46.588 (lap 5)
OFFICIAL MOTOGP RACE REPORT

=== Moto2 ===
| Pos. | No. | Biker | Constructor | Laps | Time/Retired | Grid | Points |
|---|---|---|---|---|---|---|---|
| 1 | 51 | (Spain) Pedro Acosta | Kalex | 21 | 39:35.930 | 2 | 25 |
| 2 | 16 | (United States) Joe Roberts | Kalex | 21 | +4.051 | 7 | 20 |
| 3 | 79 | (Japan) Ai Ogura | Kalex | 21 | +6.749 | 6 | 16 |
| 4 | 14 | (Italy) Tony Arbolino | Kalex | 21 | +12.312 | 8 | 13 |
| 5 | 37 | (Spain) Augusto Fernández | Kalex | 21 | +12.327 | 14 | 11 |
| 6 | 96 | (United Kingdom) Jake Dixon | Kalex | 21 | +12.513 | 9 | 10 |
| 7 | 6 | (United States) Cameron Beaubier | Kalex | 21 | +12.849 | 18 | 9 |
| 8 | 21 | (Spain) Alonso Lopez | Boscoscuro | 21 | +13.314 | 19 | 8 |
| 9 | 23 | (Germany) Marcel Schrötter | Kalex | 21 | +14.703 | 12 | 7 |
| 10 | 75 | (Spain) Albert Arenas | Kalex | 21 | +14.748 | 13 | 6 |
| 11 | 64 | (Netherlands) Bo Bendsneyder | Kalex | 21 | +15.141 | 17 | 5 |
| 12 | 9 | (Spain) Jorge Navarro | Kalex | 21 | +15.425 | 12 | 4 |
| 13 | 12 | (Czech Republic) Filip Salač | Kalex | 21 | +17.254 | 23 | 3 |
| 14 | 54 | (Spain) Fermín Aldeguer | Boscoscuro | 21 | +18.069 | 15 | 2 |
| 15 | 11 | (Italy) Mattia Pasini | Kalex | 21 | +18.750 | 5 | 1 |
| 16 | 7 | (Belgium) Barry Baltus | Kalex | 21 | +23.969 | 10 | |
| 17 | 52 | (Spain) Jeremy Alcoba | Kalex | 21 | +27.648 | 21 | |
| 18 | 28 | (Italy) Niccolò Antonelli | Kalex | 21 | +29.286 | 28 | |
| 19 | 61 | (Italy) Alessandro Zaccone | Kalex | 21 | +30.221 | 22 | |
| 20 | 18 | (Spain) Manuel González | Kalex | 21 | +35.200 | 27 | |
| 21 | 84 | (Netherlands) Zonta van den Goorbergh | Kalex | 21 | +35.223 | 26 | |
| 22 | 81 | (Thailand) Keminth Kubo | Kalex | 21 | +49.777 | 29 | |
| 23 | 4 | (United States) Sean Dylan Kelly | Kalex | 21 | +49.897 | 30 | |
| Ret | 24 | (Italy) Simone Corsi | MV Agusta | 20 | Mechanical | 25 | |
| Ret | 22 | (United Kingdom) Sam Lowes | Kalex | 18 | Accident | 3 | |
| Ret | 13 | (Italy) Celestino Vietti | Kalex | 18 | Mechanical | 4 | |
| Ret | 40 | (Spain) Arón Canet | Kalex | 12 | Accident | 1 | |
| Ret | 19 | (Italy) Lorenzo Dalla Porta | Kalex | 11 | Accident | 11 | |
| Ret | 42 | (Spain) Marcos Ramírez | MV Agusta | 10 | Accident | 16 | |
| Ret | 35 | (Thailand) Somkiat Chantra | Kalex | 4 | Accident | 24 | |
| DNS | 2 | (Argentina) Gabriel Rodrigo | Kalex | | Did not start | | |
Fastest lap: (Spain) Augusto Fernández (Kalex) – 1:52.323 (lap 9)
OFFICIAL MOTO2 RACE REPORT

- Gabriel Rodrigo withdrew from the event after Sunday warm-up due to persistent shoulder pain.

=== Moto3 ===
| Pos. | No. | Biker | Constructor | Laps | Time/Retired | Grid | Points |
|---|---|---|---|---|---|---|---|
| 1 | 11 | (Spain) Sergio García | Gas Gas | 20 | 39:43.214 | 4 | 25 |
| 2 (Note: One-position penalty for exceeding track limits on the last lap.) | 28 | (Spain) Izan Guevara | Gas Gas | 20 | –0.000 | 5 | 20 |
| 3 | 24 | (Japan) Tatsuki Suzuki | Honda | 20 | +0.012 | 11 | 16 |
| 4 | 16 | (Italy) Andrea Migno | Honda | 20 | +0.137 | 16 | 13 |
| 5 | 6 | (Japan) Ryusei Yamanaka | KTM | 20 | +0.234 | 9 | 11 |
| 6 | 54 | (Italy) Riccardo Rossi | Honda | 20 | +0.999 | 8 | 10 |
| 7 | 48 | (Spain) Iván Ortolá | KTM | 20 | +5.387 | 21 | 9 |
| 8 | 23 | (Italy) Elia Bartolini | KTM | 20 | +5.477 | 24 | 8 |
| 9 | 18 | (Italy) Matteo Bertelle | KTM | 20 | +5.480 | 13 | 7 |
| 10 | 31 | (Spain) Adrián Fernández | KTM | 20 | +5.747 | 19 | 6 |
| 11 | 44 | (Spain) David Muñoz | KTM | 20 | +5.751 | 15 | 5 |
| 12 | 66 | (Australia) Joel Kelso | KTM | 20 | +5.989 | 20 | 4 |
| 13 | 64 | (Indonesia) Mario Aji | Honda | 20 | +6.109 | 23 | 3 |
| 14 | 20 | (France) Lorenzo Fellon | Honda | 20 | +12.643 | 12 | 2 |
| 15 | 53 | (Turkey) Deniz Öncü | KTM | 20 | +16.689 | 1 | 1 |
| 16 | 27 | (Japan) Kaito Toba | KTM | 20 | +16.738 | 25 | |
| 17 | 5 | (Spain) Jaume Masià | KTM | 20 | +16.789 | 10 | |
| 18 | 72 | (Japan) Taiyo Furusato | Honda | 20 | +19.449 | 22 | |
| 19 | 99 | (Spain) Carlos Tatay | CFMoto | 20 | +32.404 | 17 | |
| 20 | 43 | (Spain) Xavier Artigas | CFMoto | 20 | +33.421 | 26 | |
| 21 | 70 | (United Kingdom) Joshua Whatley | Honda | 20 | +41.412 | 27 | |
| 22 | 22 | (Spain) Ana Carrasco | KTM | 20 | +1:14.077 | 28 | |
| Ret | 10 | (Brazil) Diogo Moreira | KTM | 19 | Accident | 7 | |
| Ret | 96 | (Spain) Daniel Holgado | KTM | 10 | Accident | 2 | |
| Ret | 7 | (Italy) Dennis Foggia | Honda | 10 | Accident | 3 | |
| Ret | 17 | (United Kingdom) John McPhee | Husqvarna | 10 | Accident | 6 | |
| Ret | 82 | (Italy) Stefano Nepa | KTM | 3 | Accident | 18 | |
| Ret | 19 | (United Kingdom) Scott Ogden | Honda | 0 | Accident | 14 | |
| DNS | 71 | (Japan) Ayumu Sasaki | Husqvarna | | Did not start | | |
| DNS | 67 | (Italy) Alberto Surra | Honda | | Did not start | | |
Fastest lap: (Italy) Riccardo Rossi (Honda) – 1:57.234 (lap 9)
OFFICIAL MOTO3 RACE REPORT

- Ayumu Sasaki suffered two broken collarbones in a crash during practice & withdrew from the event.
- Alberto Surra suffered a broken metatarsal bone in a crash during practice and was declared unfit to compete.

=== MotoE ===
==== Race 1 ====
| Pos. | No. | Biker | Laps | Time/Retired | Grid | Points |
|---|---|---|---|---|---|---|
| 1 | 77 | (Switzerland) Dominique Aegerter | 5 | 10:10.913 | 1 | 25 |
| 2 | 11 | (Italy) Matteo Ferrari | 5 | +0.033 | 5 | 20 |
| 3 | 51 | (Brazil) Eric Granado | 5 | +0.245 | 4 | 16 |
| 4 | 27 | (Italy) Mattia Casadei | 5 | +0.975 | 3 | 13 |
| 5 | 70 | (Spain) Marc Alcoba | 5 | +0.983 | 10 | 11 |
| 6 | 7 | (Italy) Niccolò Canepa | 5 | +1.063 | 7 | 10 |
| 7 | 71 | (Spain) Miquel Pons | 5 | +1.656 | 9 | 9 |
| 8 | 21 | (Italy) Kevin Zannoni | 5 | +1.742 | 2 | 8 |
| 9 | 4 | (Spain) Héctor Garzó | 5 | +2.338 | 12 | 7 |
| 10 | 34 | (Italy) Kevin Manfredi | 5 | +2.616 | 6 | 6 |
| 11 | 78 | (Japan) Hikari Okubo | 5 | +6.337 | 11 | 5 |
| 12 | 12 | (Spain) Xavi Forés | 5 | +6.644 | 15 | 4 |
| 13 | 72 | (Italy) Alessio Finello | 5 | +7.005 | 13 | 3 |
| 14 | 17 | (Spain) Álex Escrig | 5 | +9.847 | 17 | 2 |
| 15 | 55 | (Italy) Massimo Roccoli | 5 | +13.374 | 14 | 1 |
| 16 | 6 | (Spain) María Herrera | 5 | +13.795 | 16 | |
| DSQ | 9 | (Italy) Andrea Mantovani | 5 | Disqualified | 8 | |
| DNS | 18 | (Andorra) Xavi Cardelús | | Did not start | | |
Fastest lap: (Switzerland) Dominique Aegerter – 1:58.939 (lap 5)
OFFICIAL MOTOE RACE NR.1 REPORT

- All bikes manufactured by Energica.

==== Race 2 ====
| Pos. | No. | Biker | Laps | Time/Retired | Grid | Points |
|---|---|---|---|---|---|---|
| 1 | 11 | (Italy) Matteo Ferrari | 6 | 12:04.368 | 5 | 25 |
| 2 | 77 | (Switzerland) Dominique Aegerter | 6 | +0.529 | 1 | 20 |
| 3 | 71 | (Spain) Miquel Pons | 6 | +0.566 | 9 | 16 |
| 4 | 9 | (Italy) Andrea Mantovani | 6 | +1.621 | 8 | 13 |
| 5 | 21 | (Italy) Kevin Zannoni | 6 | +1.726 | 2 | 11 |
| 6 | 7 | (Italy) Niccolò Canepa | 6 | +0.739^{1} | 7 | 10 |
| 7 | 70 | (Spain) Marc Alcoba | 6 | +0.529^{1} | 10 | 9 |
| 8 | 51 | (Brazil) Eric Granado | 6 | +1.678^{1} | 4 | 8 |
| 9 | 34 | (Italy) Kevin Manfredi | 6 | +2.636 | 6 | 7 |
| 10 | 4 | (Spain) Héctor Garzó | 6 | +4.586 | 12 | 6 |
| 11 | 55 | (Italy) Massimo Roccoli | 6 | +10.091 | 15 | 5 |
| 12 | 12 | (Spain) Xavi Forés | 6 | +10.547 | 16 | 4 |
| 13 | 17 | (Italy) Álex Escrig | 6 | +10.764 | 18 | 3 |
| 14 | 72 | (Italy) Alessio Finello | 6 | +12.165 | 14 | 2 |
| 15 | 6 | (Spain) María Herrera | 6 | +17.117 | 17 | 1 |
| Ret | 27 | (Spain) Mattia Casadei | 0 | Collision | 3 | |
| Ret | 78 | (Japan) Hikari Okubo | 0 | Collision | 11 | |
| DNS | 18 | (Andorra) Xavi Cardelús | | Did not start | | |
Fastest lap: (Switzerland) Dominique Aegerter – 1:59.068 (lap 6)
OFFICIAL MOTOE RACE NR.2 REPORT

- All bikes manufactured by Energica.

Notes:

- ^1 - Marc Alcoba, Niccolo Canepa and Eric Granado all were demoted due to ignoring yellow flags.

== Championship standings after the race ==
Below are the standings for the top five riders, constructors, and teams after the round.

=== MotoGP ===
Riders' Championship standings

| | Pos. | Rider | Points |
|---|---|---|---|
| | 1 | (France) Fabio Quartararo | 122 |
| | 2 | (Spain) Aleix Espargaró | 114 |
| | 3 | (Italy) Enea Bastianini | 94 |
| 3 | 4 | (Italy) Francesco Bagnaia | 81 |
| 1 | 5 | (France) Johann Zarco | 75 |

Constructors' Championship standings

| Pos. | Constructor | Points |
|---|---|---|
| 1 | (Italy) Ducati | 181 |
| 2 | (Japan) Yamaha | 122 |
| 3 | (Italy) Aprilia | 115 |
| 4 | (Austria) KTM | 93 |
| 5 | (Japan) Suzuki | 80 |

Teams' Championship standings

| | Pos. | Team | Points |
|---|---|---|---|
| | 1 | (Italy) Aprilia Racing | 151 |
| 2 | 2 | (Italy) Ducati Lenovo Team | 144 |
| | 3 | (Japan) Monster Energy Yamaha MotoGP | 141 |
| 2 | 4 | (Japan) Team Suzuki Ecstar | 125 |
| | 5 | (Austria) Red Bull KTM Factory Racing | 115 |

=== Moto2 ===
Riders' Championship standings

| | Pos. | Rider | Points |
|---|---|---|---|
| | 1 | (Italy) Celestino Vietti | 108 |
| | 2 | (Japan) Ai Ogura | 108 |
| | 3 | (Spain) Arón Canet | 89 |
| 2 | 4 | (United States) Joe Roberts | 86 |
| 1 | 5 | (Italy) Tony Arbolino | 83 |

Constructors' Championship standings

| Pos. | Constructor | Points |
|---|---|---|
| 1 | (Germany) Kalex | 200 |
| 2 | (Italy) Boscoscuro | 28 |
| 3 | (Italy) MV Agusta | 5 |

Teams' Championship standings

| | Pos. | Team | Points |
|---|---|---|---|
| | 1 | (Japan) Idemitsu Honda Team Asia | 169 |
| | 2 | (Spain) Flexbox HP40 | 145 |
| 2 | 3 | (Finland) Red Bull KTM Ajo | 125 |
| | 4 | (Belgium) Elf Marc VDS Racing Team | 118 |
| 2 | 5 | (Italy) Mooney VR46 Racing Team | 108 |

=== Moto3 ===
Riders' Championship standings

| | Pos. | Rider | Points |
|---|---|---|---|
| | 1 | (Spain) Sergio García | 137 |
| 2 | 2 | (Spain) Izan Guevara | 109 |
| 1 | 3 | (Spain) Jaume Masià | 95 |
| 1 | 4 | (Italy) Dennis Foggia | 89 |
| | 5 | (Japan) Ayumu Sasaki | 75 |

Constructors' Championship standings

| Pos. | Constructor | Points |
|---|---|---|
| 1 | (Spain) Gas Gas | 165 |
| 2 | (Austria) KTM | 134 |
| 3 | (Japan) Honda | 132 |
| 4 | (Sweden) Husqvarna | 86 |
| 5 | (China) CFMoto | 71 |

Teams' Championship standings

| Pos. | Team | Points |
|---|---|---|
| 1 | (Spain) Valresa GasGas Aspar Team | 246 |
| 2 | (Luxembourg) Leopard Racing | 149 |
| 3 | (Finland) Red Bull KTM Ajo | 123 |
| 4 | (Italy) Sterilgarda Husqvarna Max | 90 |
| 5 | (Germany) CFMoto Racing Prüstel GP | 89 |

=== MotoE ===
| | Pos. | Rider | Points |
|---|---|---|---|
| | 1 | (Switzerland) Dominique Aegerter | 123 |
| | 2 | (Brazil) Eric Granado | 94 |
| 1 | 3 | (Italy) Matteo Ferrari | 93 |
| 1 | 4 | (Italy) Mattia Casadei | 74 |
| 1 | 5 | (Spain) Miquel Pons | 69 |

== Notes ==
| Previous race: 2022 French Grand Prix | FIM Grand Prix World Championship; 2022 season | Next race: 2022 Catalan Grand Prix |
| Previous race: 2021 Italian Grand Prix | Italian motorcycle Grand Prix | Next race: 2023 Italian Grand Prix |
