= Mattia Casadei =

Italian motorcycle racer (born 1999)

- Nationality: Italian
- Born: 2 July 1999 (age 27); Rimini, Italy
- Current team: D34G WorldSSP Racing Team
- Bike number: 40
Motorcycle racing career statistics
Moto2 World Championship
| Active years | 2021, 2023 |
| Manufacturers | Kalex |
| Championships | 0 |
| 2021 championship position | NC (0 pts) |
Starts / Wins / Podiums / Poles / F. laps / Points; 7 / 0 / 0 / 0 / 0 / 0
MotoE World Championship
| Active years | 2019–2025 |
| Manufacturers | Energica, Ducati |
| Championships | 1 (2023) |
| 2025 championship position | 2nd (188 pts) |
Starts / Wins / Podiums / Poles / F. laps / Points; 77 / 13 / 40 / 7 / 7 / 1027
Supersport World Championship
| Active years | 2021-2022, 2025- |
| Manufacturers | Yamaha, MV Agusta, Ducati |
| Championships | 0 |
| 2025 championship position | 20th (61 pts) |
Starts / Wins / Podiums / Poles / F. laps / Points; 20 / 0 / 0 / 2 / 0 / 86

Mattia Casadei (born 2 July 1999) is an Italian Grand Prix motorcycle racer who currently competes in the Supersport World Championship for the D34G WorldSSP Racing Team. He was the inaugural MotoE World Champion winner in 2023.

== Career statistics ==
=== FIM CEV Moto3 Junior World Championship ===
==== Races by year ====
(key) (Races in bold indicate pole position, races in italics indicate fastest lap)

| Year | Bike | 1 | 2 | 3 | 4 | 5 | 6 | 7 | 8 | 9 | 10 | 11 | 12 | Pos | Pts |
|---|---|---|---|---|---|---|---|---|---|---|---|---|---|---|---|
| 2017 | Honda | ALB; 15 | LMS; Ret | CAT1; 17 | CAT2; Ret | VAL1; Ret | VAL2; Ret | EST; 11 | JER1; 25 | JER1; 16 | ARA; 19 | VAL1; Ret | VAL2; DNS | 32nd | 6 |

=== FIM Moto2 European Championship ===
==== Races by year ====
(key) (Races in bold indicate pole position, races in italics indicate fastest lap)

| Year | Bike | 1 | 2 | 3 | 4 | 5 | 6 | 7 | 8 | 9 | 10 | 11 | Pos | Pts |
|---|---|---|---|---|---|---|---|---|---|---|---|---|---|---|
| 2024 | Boscoscuro | MIS; 4 | **EST1**; 1 | **EST2**; 2 | CAT1; 5 | CAT2; 4 | POR1; 6 | POR2; 5 | JER; 3 | ARA1; 5 | ARA2; 6 | EST; 3 | 2nd | 156 |

=== Grand Prix motorcycle racing ===
==== By season ====
| Season | Class | Motorcycle | Team | Race | Win | Podium | Pole | FLap | Pts | Plcd |
|---|---|---|---|---|---|---|---|---|---|---|
| 2019 | MotoE | Energica | Ongetta Sic58 Squadra Corse | 6 | 0 | 1 | 0 | 0 | 39 | 10th |
| 2020 | MotoE | Energica | Ongetta Sic58 Squadra Corse | 7 | 0 | 2 | 0 | 0 | 74 | 5th |
| 2021 | MotoE | Energica | Ongetta Sic58 Squadra Corse | 6 | 0 | 3 | 0 | 0 | 79 | 6th |
| 2021 | Moto2 | Kalex | Italtrans Racing Team | 1 | 0 | 0 | 0 | 0 | 0 | NC |
| 2022 | MotoE | Energica | Pons Racing 40 | 12 | 2 | 7 | 1 | 1 | 156 | 4th |
| 2023 | MotoE | Ducati | Pons Racing 40 | 16 | 5 | 10 | 2 | 4 | 260 | **1st** |
| 2023 | Moto2 | Kalex | Fantic Racing | 6 | 0 | 0 | 0 | 0 | 0 | 40th |
| 2024 | MotoE | Ducati | LCR E-Team | 16 | 3 | 10 | 2 | 1 | 231 | **2nd** |
| 2025 | MotoE | Ducati V21L | LCR E-Team | 14 | 3 | 7 | 2 | 1 | 188 | **2nd** |
| Total | | | | **84** | **13** | **40** | **7** | **7** | **1027** | |

==== By class ====
| Class | Seasons | 1st GP | 1st pod | 1st win | Race | Win | Podiums | Pole | FLap | Pts | WChmp |
|---|---|---|---|---|---|---|---|---|---|---|---|
| MotoE | 2019–2025 | 2019 Germany | 2019 San Marino | 2022 French | 77 | 13 | 40 | 7 | 7 | 1027 | 1 |
| Moto2 | 2021, 2023 | 2021 Emilia Romagna | | | 7 | 0 | 0 | 0 | 0 | 0 | 0 |
| Total | 2019–2025 | | | | **84** | **13** | **40** | **7** | **7** | **1027** | **0** |

==== Races by year ====
(key) (Races in bold indicate pole position; races in italics indicate fastest lap)

| Year | Class | Bike | 1 | 2 | 3 | 4 | 5 | 6 | 7 | 8 | 9 | 10 | 11 | 12 | 13 | 14 | 15 | 16 | 17 | 18 | 19 | 20 | Pos | Pts |
|---|---|---|---|---|---|---|---|---|---|---|---|---|---|---|---|---|---|---|---|---|---|---|---|---|
| 2019 | MotoE | Energica | GER; 11 | AUT; 13 | RSM1; Ret | RSM2; 3 | VAL1; 9 | VAL2; 8 | | | | | | | | | | | | | | | 10th | 39 |
| 2020 | MotoE | Energica | SPA; 5 | ANC; 3 | RSM; 5 | EMI1; 9 | EMI2; 2 | FRA1; Ret | FRA2; 13 | | | | | | | | | | | | | | 5th | 74 |
| 2021 | MotoE | Energica | SPA; 4 | FRA; 2 | CAT; Ret | NED; 6 | AUT | RSM1; 3 | RSM2; 2 | | | | | | | | | | | | | | 6th | 79 |
| 2021 | Moto2 | Kalex | QAT | DOH | POR | SPA | FRA | ITA | CAT | GER | NED | STY | AUT | GBR | ARA | RSM | AME | EMI; Ret | ALR | VAL | | | NC | 0 |
| 2022 | MotoE | Energica | SPA1; 17 | SPA2; 3 | **FRA1**; 1 | **FRA2**; 2 | ITA1; 4 | ITA2; Ret | NED1; 3 | NED2; 3^{‡} | AUT1; Ret | AUT2; 4 | RSM1; 1 | RSM2; 2 | | | | | | | | | 4th | 156 |
| 2023 | MotoE | Ducati | FRA1; Ret | FRA2; 4 | ITA1; 3 | ITA2; Ret | GER1; 5 | GER2; 2 | NED1; 4 | NED2; 3 | GBR1; 6 | GBR2; 1 | AUT1; 1 | AUT2; 1 | CAT1; 2 | CAT2; 1 | **RSM1**; 1 | **RSM2**; 3 | | | | | 1st | 260 |
| 2023 | Moto2 | Kalex | POR | ARG | AME | SPA | FRA | ITA | GER | NED | GBR | AUT | CAT | RSM | IND | JPN; 26 | INA; 24 | AUS; Ret | THA; 21 | MAL; 21 | QAT; 26 | VAL; 25 | 40th | 0 |
| 2024 | MotoE | Ducati | POR1; 3 | POR2; 1 | FRA1; 3 | FRA2; 2 | CAT1; 6 | CAT2; Ret | ITA1; 1 | ITA2; 2 | NED1; Ret | NED2; 8 | GER1; 9 | GER2; 9 | AUT1; 3 | AUT2; 3 | **RSM1**; 1 | **RSM2**; 2 | | | | | 2nd | 231 |
| 2025 | MotoE | Ducati | FRA1; 5 | FRA2; 1 | **NED1**; 16 | **NED2**; 6 | AUT1; Ret | AUT2; 2 | **HUN1**; 1 | **HUN2**; 1 | CAT1; Ret | CAT2; 3 | RSM1; 9 | RSM2; 3 | POR1; 4 | POR2; 2 | | | | | | | 2nd | 188 |

^{‡} Half points awarded as less than two thirds of the race distance (but at least three full laps) was completed.

=== Supersport World Championship ===
==== Races by year ====
(key) (Races in bold indicate pole position; races in italics indicate fastest lap)

| Year | Bike | 1 | | 2 | | 3 | | 4 | | 5 | | 6 | | 7 | | 8 | | 9 | | 10 | | 11 | | 12 | | Pos | Pts |
| Year | Bike | R1 | R2 | R1 | R2 | R1 | R2 | R1 | R2 | R1 | R2 | R1 | R2 | R1 | R2 | R1 | R2 | R1 | R2 | R1 | R2 | R1 | R2 | R1 | R2 | Pos | Pts |
|---|---|---|---|---|---|---|---|---|---|---|---|---|---|---|---|---|---|---|---|---|---|---|---|---|---|---|---|
| 2021 | Yamaha | SPA | SPA | POR | POR | ITA | ITA | NED; Ret | NED; Ret | CZE | CZE | SPA | SPA | FRA | FRA | SPA | SPA | SPA | SPA | POR | POR | ARG | ARG | INA | INA | NC | 0 |
| 2022 | MV Agusta | SPA | SPA | NED | NED | POR | POR | ITA; 8 | ITA; 8 | GBR; 12 | GBR; 11 | CZE | CZE | FRA | FRA | SPA | SPA | POR | POR | ARG | ARG | INA | INA | AUS | AUS | 24th | 25 |
| 2025 | MV Agusta | AUS | AUS | POR | POR | NED | NED | ITA | ITA | CZE | CZE | EMI; 11 | EMI; 7 | GBR; 8 | GBR; 10 | HUN; Ret | HUN; 9 | FRA | FRA | **ARA**; 11 | ARA; Ret | POR; 27 | POR; 17 | **SPA**; 6 | SPA; 5 | 20th | 61 |
| 2026 | Ducati | AUS; Ret | AUS; 27 | POR | POR | NED | NED | HUN | HUN | CZE | CZE | ARA | ARA | EMI | EMI | GBR | GBR | FRA | FRA | ITA | ITA | EST | EST | SPA | SPA | 28th* | 0* |

* Season still in progress.

=== CIV National 600 ===
==== Races by year ====
(key) (Races in bold indicate pole position; races in italics indicate fastest lap)

| Year | Bike | 1 | | 2 | | 3 | | 4 | | 5 | | 6 | | Pos | Pts |
| Year | Bike | R1 | R2 | R1 | R2 | R1 | R2 | R1 | R2 | R1 | R2 | R1 | R2 | Pos | Pts |
|---|---|---|---|---|---|---|---|---|---|---|---|---|---|---|---|
| 2022 | Yamaha | MIS; 7 | MIS; 10 | VAL; 5 | VAL; 14 | MUG | MUG | MIS2; 12 | MIS2; Ret | MUG2; Ret | MUG2; C | IMO; Ret | IMO; Ret | 15th | 32 |
