= 2021 Moto2 World Championship =

12th running of the Moto2 World Championship

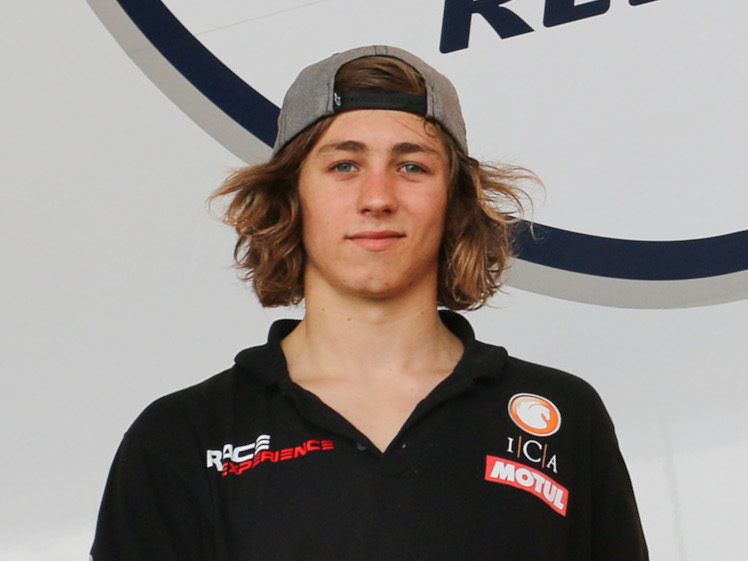
Remy Gardner (pictured in 2016) was the 2021 Moto2 World Riders' Champion.

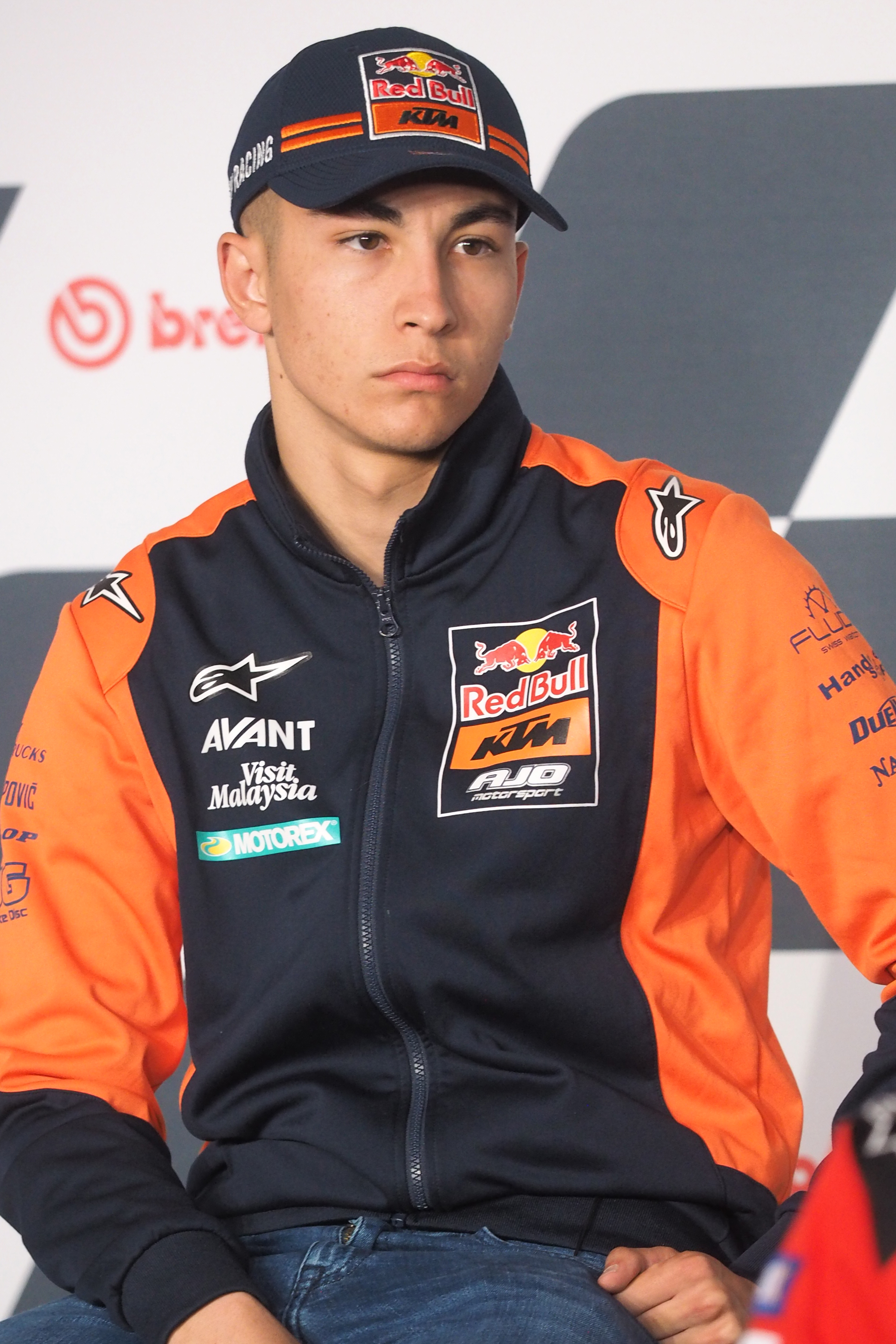
Raúl Fernández finished runner-up and was the 2021 Moto2 Rookie of the Year.

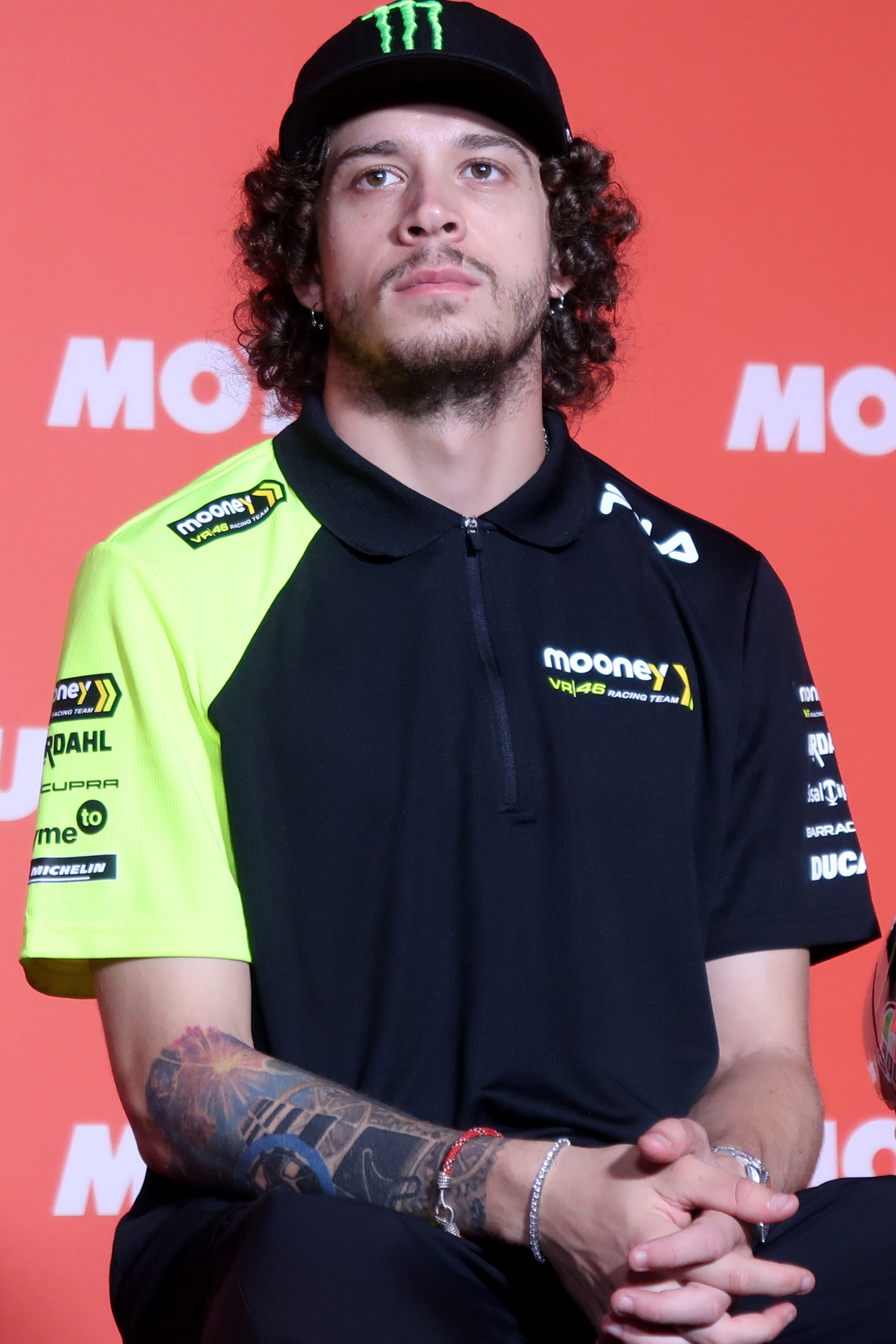
Marco Bezzecchi (pictured in 2023) finished third.

The 2021 FIM Moto2 World Championship was the intermediate class of the 73rd Fédération Internationale de Motocyclisme (FIM) Road Racing World Championship season. Remy Gardner won the world championship in the final race at Valencia. This season also saw the retirement of the intermediate class veteran Thomas Lüthi, as well the final season a 250cc-era debutant participated in the intermediate class.

== Teams and riders ==
Team	Constructor	Motorcycle	No.	Rider	Rounds
(Spain) Aspar Team Moto2 (Note: This is the team name entered in the championship. Other team names used during the season are Inde Aspar Team (rounds 1, 4–5, 7, 14–15, 18), Solunion Aspar Team (rounds 2–3), Kipin Energy Aspar Team (round 6, 12–13), and QuieroCorredor Aspar Team (round 17).)	Boscoscuro	B-21	44	(Spain) Arón Canet	All
(Spain) Aspar Team Moto2	Boscoscuro	B-21	75	(Spain) Albert Arenas	All
(Italy) Speed Up Racing (Note: This is the team name entered in the championship. Other team names used during the season are MB Conveyors Speed Up (rounds 1–2, 4–7, 15), Lightech Speed Up (round 3, 10–12), +Ego Speed Up (rounds 8–9, 13–14, 16) and Termozeta Speed Up (rounds 17-18).)	Boscoscuro	B-21	5	(Italy) Yari Montella	1–5 (Note: Yari Montella competed in the first Friday practice session during round 5, before being replaced by Alonso López due to injury.), 10–11, 14
(Italy) Speed Up Racing	Boscoscuro	B-21	2	(Spain) Alonso López	5, 7, 9
(Italy) Speed Up Racing	Boscoscuro	B-21	54	(Spain) Fermín Aldeguer	6, 8, 12–13
(Italy) Speed Up Racing	Boscoscuro	B-21	54	(Spain) Fermín Aldeguer	15–18
(Italy) Speed Up Racing	Boscoscuro	B-21	9	(Spain) Jorge Navarro	All
(United States) American Racing	Kalex	Moto2	6	(United States) Cameron Beaubier	All
(United States) American Racing	Kalex	Moto2	42	(Spain) Marcos Ramírez	All
(Italy) Cerba Promoracing Team	Kalex	Moto2	18	(Andorra) Xavier Cardelús	13
(Belgium) Elf Marc VDS Racing Team	Kalex	Moto2	22	(United Kingdom) Sam Lowes	All
(Belgium) Elf Marc VDS Racing Team	Kalex	Moto2	37	(Spain) Augusto Fernández	All
(Italy) Federal Oil Gresini Moto2	Kalex	Moto2	11	(Italy) Nicolò Bulega	All
(Italy) Federal Oil Gresini Moto2	Kalex	Moto2	21	(Italy) Fabio Di Giannantonio	All
(Spain) Flexbox HP40	Kalex	Moto2	40	(Spain) Héctor Garzó	1–7, 9–18
(Spain) Flexbox HP40	Kalex	Moto2	2	(Spain) Alonso López	8
(Spain) Flexbox HP40	Kalex	Moto2	62	(Italy) Stefano Manzi	All
(Japan) Idemitsu Honda Team Asia	Kalex	Moto2	35	(Thailand) Somkiat Chantra	All
(Japan) Idemitsu Honda Team Asia	Kalex	Moto2	79	(Japan) Ai Ogura	1–17
(Italy) Italtrans Racing Team	Kalex	Moto2	16	(United States) Joe Roberts	All
(Italy) Italtrans Racing Team	Kalex	Moto2	19	(Italy) Lorenzo Dalla Porta	1–14
(Italy) Italtrans Racing Team	Kalex	Moto2	45	(Japan) Tetsuta Nagashima	15, 17–18
(Italy) Italtrans Racing Team	Kalex	Moto2	27	(Italy) Mattia Casadei	16
(Germany) Liqui Moly Intact GP	Kalex	Moto2	14	(Italy) Tony Arbolino	All
(Germany) Liqui Moly Intact GP	Kalex	Moto2	23	(Germany) Marcel Schrötter	All
(Indonesia) Pertamina Mandalika SAG Team (Note: Wildcard Piotr Biesiekirski used the team name Pertamina Mandalika SAG Euvic during rounds 7, 13, 17 and wildcard Taiga Hada used the team name Pertamina Mandalika SAG Teluru during round 11.)	Kalex	Moto2	12	(Switzerland) Thomas Lüthi	All
(Indonesia) Pertamina Mandalika SAG Team	Kalex	Moto2	64	(Netherlands) Bo Bendsneyder	All
(Indonesia) Pertamina Mandalika SAG Team	Kalex	Moto2	74	(Poland) Piotr Biesiekirski	7, 13, 17
(Indonesia) Pertamina Mandalika SAG Team	Kalex	Moto2	29	(Japan) Taiga Hada	11
(Indonesia) Pertamina Mandalika SAG Team	Kalex	Moto2	20	(Indonesia) Dimas Ekky Pratama	18
(Malaysia) Petronas Sprinta Racing	Kalex	Moto2	96	(United Kingdom) Jake Dixon	1–11, 14–18
(Malaysia) Petronas Sprinta Racing	Kalex	Moto2	77	(Malaysia) Adam Norrodin	12
(Malaysia) Petronas Sprinta Racing	Kalex	Moto2	17	(United Kingdom) John McPhee	13
(Malaysia) Petronas Sprinta Racing	Kalex	Moto2	97	(Spain) Xavi Vierge	All
(Finland) Red Bull KTM Ajo	Kalex	Moto2	25	(Spain) Raúl Fernández	All
(Finland) Red Bull KTM Ajo	Kalex	Moto2	87	(Australia) Remy Gardner	All
(Italy) Sky Racing Team VR46	Kalex	Moto2	13	(Italy) Celestino Vietti	All
(Italy) Sky Racing Team VR46	Kalex	Moto2	72	(Italy) Marco Bezzecchi	All
(Italy) VR46 Master Camp Team	Kalex	Moto2	81	(Thailand) Keminth Kubo	7
(Switzerland) MV Agusta Forward Racing	MV Agusta	F2	7	(Italy) Lorenzo Baldassarri	1–8, 10–12, 14–18
(Switzerland) MV Agusta Forward Racing	MV Agusta	F2	18	(Spain) Manuel González	9
(Switzerland) MV Agusta Forward Racing	MV Agusta	F2	81	(Spain) Manuel González	13
(Switzerland) MV Agusta Forward Racing	MV Agusta	F2	24	(Italy) Simone Corsi	1, 4–18
(Switzerland) MV Agusta Forward Racing	MV Agusta	F2	10	(Italy) Tommaso Marcon	2
(Switzerland) MV Agusta Forward Racing	MV Agusta	F2	77	(Spain) Miquel Pons	3
(Switzerland) MV Agusta Forward Racing	MV Agusta	F2	10	(Italy) Tommaso Marcon	4–6
(Netherlands) NTS RW Racing GP	NTS	NH7	55	(Malaysia) Hafizh Syahrin	1–15, 17–18
(Netherlands) NTS RW Racing GP	NTS	NH7	10	(Italy) Tommaso Marcon	16
(Netherlands) NTS RW Racing GP	NTS	NH7	70	(Belgium) Barry Baltus	1, 5–18
(Netherlands) NTS RW Racing GP	NTS	NH7	89	(United Kingdom) Fraser Rogers	3
(Netherlands) NTS RW Racing GP	NTS	NH7	32	(Japan) Taiga Hada	4

Key
Regular rider
Replacement rider
Wildcard rider

All teams used series-specified Dunlop tyres and Triumph 765cc 3-cylinder engines.

=== Team changes ===
- On 27 November 2020, Mandalika Racing Team Indonesia entered the series partnering with SAG Team under the name "Pertamina Mandalika SAG Team" and retaining the existing SAG Team riders Thomas Lüthi and Kasma Daniel. Kasma Daniel later decided not to compete with the team any longer and had his contract terminated on mutual consent with the team. Bo Bendsneyder was his replacement
- Onexox TKKR withdrew from the Moto2 world championship on 1 December 2020 due to sponsorship difficulties, and would focus on their other championship activities as well as planning to enter FIM CEV Repsol Moto2 for the year 2021 and would try coming back to Moto2 in 2022 as a team.

=== Rider changes ===
- Jorge Martin moved up to the premier class joining Pramac Racing.
- Thomas Lüthi joined Pertamina Mandalika SAG Team, replacing Remy Gardner who moved to Red Bull KTM Ajo.
- Raul Fernandez moved up from Moto3 joining Red Bull KTM Ajo partnering with Remy Gardner.
- Tony Arbolino moved up from Moto3, joining Intact GP.
- Barry Baltus moved up from Moto3, joining NTS RW Racing GP.
- Fabio Di Giannantonio returned to Gresini Racing, replacing Edgar Pons. Di Giannantonio previously competed with them in Moto3 from 2016 to 2018. He is replaced by the Moto2 European Champion Yari Montella.
- Lorenzo Baldassarri switched places with Stefano Manzi to return to Forward Racing. Baldassarri had previously competed with them in Moto2 from 2015 to 2017.
- Albert Arenas moved up from Moto3 while remaining with Aspar Team.
- Joe Roberts moved to Italtrans to replace Enea Bastianini, who moved up to MotoGP with Esponsorama Racing.
- 5-time reigning AMA Superbike champion Cameron Beaubier entered Moto2 with American Racing.
- Ai Ogura moved up from Moto3 with Honda Team Asia and replaced Andi Farid Izdihar who moves down to Moto3.
- Bo Bendsneyder joined Pertamina Mandalika SAG Team, replacing Kasma Daniel. Bendsneyder was previously set to race in the Supersport World Championship after leaving NTS RW Racing GP. Hafizh Syahrin later joined the team to replace Bendsneyder.
- Celestino Vietti moved up from Moto3 joining Sky Racing Team VR46 replacing Luca Marini who moved up to the premier class joining Esponsorama Racing.

==== Mid-season changes ====
- Tommaso Marcon replaced Simone Corsi for the Doha round because of an injury.
- Miquel Pons replaced Simone Corsi for the Portuguese round because of an injury.
- Fraser Rogers replaced Barry Baltus for the Portuguese round because of a fractured left wrist.
- Taiga Hada replaced Barry Baltus for the Spanish round because of a fractured left wrist.
- Yari Montella missed several Grands Prix due to injuries. Alonso López replaced him for the French and Catalan rounds, while Fermín Aldeguer replaced him for the Italian and German rounds. He was cleared to race during the British Grand Prix, but was suspended by his own team due to concerns with his injury. Aldeguer replaced him for that round and the succeeding Aragonese round. Speed Up eventually terminated Montella's contract after the San Marino Grand Prix and was replaced by Aldeguer for the rest of the season.
- Alonso López replaced Héctor Garzó for the German round because of burns suffered from a previous crash.
- Lorenzo Baldassarri missed the Dutch round after having surgery on his fractured hand sustained during the preceding German round. He was replaced by Manuel González. Baldassarri returned to race the next three rounds, but was replaced again by González during the Aragonese round to prioritise his recovery.
- Jake Dixon raced in MotoGP for Petronas Yamaha SRT as a replacement for the injured Franco Morbidelli during the British and Aragon Grands Prix. Adam Norrodin and John McPhee replaced Dixon for the British and Aragonese rounds, respectively.
- Lorenzo Dalla Porta underwent surgery prior to the Grand Prix of the Americas and was forced to miss the rest of the season. Tetsuta Nagashima replaced him for the remaining races, except the Emilia Romagna round, where Mattia Casadei replaced Dalla Porta.
- Hafizh Syahrin missed the Emilia Romagna round because of family problems that prevented him from leaving his home country Malaysia. He was replaced by Tommaso Marcon for the round.

== Calendar ==
The following Grands Prix took place in 2021:

Round	Date	Grand Prix	Circuit
1	28 March (Note: Night race)	Barwa Grand Prix of Qatar	Lusail International Circuit, Lusail
2	4 April	(Qatar) Tissot Grand Prix of Doha	Lusail International Circuit, Lusail
3	18 April	Grande Prémio 888 de Portugal	Algarve International Circuit, Portimão
4	2 May	(Spain) Gran Premio Red Bull de España	Circuito de Jerez, Jerez de la Frontera
5	16 May	Shark Grand Prix de France	Bugatti Circuit, Le Mans
6	30 May	(Italy) Gran Premio d'Italia Oakley	Mugello Circuit, Scarperia e San Piero
7	6 June	(Catalonia) Gran Premi Monster Energy de Catalunya	Circuit de Barcelona-Catalunya, Montmeló
8	20 June	(Germany) Liqui Moly Motorrad Grand Prix Deutschland	Sachsenring, Hohenstein-Ernstthal
9	27 June	(Netherlands) Motul TT Assen	TT Circuit Assen, Assen
10	8 August	Michelin Grand Prix of Styria	Red Bull Ring, Spielberg
11	15 August	(Austria) Bitci Motorrad Grand Prix von Österreich	Red Bull Ring, Spielberg
12	29 August	(United Kingdom) Monster Energy British Grand Prix	Silverstone Circuit, Silverstone
13	12 September	(Aragon) Gran Premio Tissot de Aragón	MotorLand Aragón, Alcañiz
14	19 September	Gran Premio Octo di San Marino e della Riviera di Rimini	Misano World Circuit, Misano Adriatico
15	3 October	(United States) Red Bull Grand Prix of the Americas	Circuit of the Americas, Austin
16	24 October	Gran Premio Nolan del Made in Italy e dell'Emilia-Romagna	Misano World Circuit, Misano Adriatico
17	7 November	(Portugal) Grande Prémio Brembo do Algarve	Algarve International Circuit, Portimão
18	14 November	(Valencian Community) Gran Premio Motul de la Comunitat Valenciana	Circuit Ricardo Tormo, Valencia
Cancelled Grands Prix
-	~~11 April~~	(Argentina) Argentine Republic motorcycle Grand Prix	Autódromo Termas de Río Hondo, Termas de Río Hondo
-	~~11 July~~	(Finland) Finnish motorcycle Grand Prix	Kymi Ring, Iitti
-	~~3 October~~	(Japan) Japanese motorcycle Grand Prix	Motegi Circuit, Motegi
-	~~17 October~~	Thailand motorcycle Grand Prix	Buriram International Circuit, Buriram
-	~~24 October~~	(Australia) Australian motorcycle Grand Prix	Phillip Island Grand Prix Circuit, Phillip Island
-	~~24 October~~	(Malaysia) Malaysian motorcycle Grand Prix	Sepang International Circuit, Sepang

=== Grand Prix locations ===
Location of non-European Grands Prix in 2021.
(scheduled Grand Prix: cancelled Grand Prix)
Location of European Grands Prix in 2021.
(scheduled Grand Prix: cancelled Grand Prix)

=== Calendar changes ===
- The Finnish Grand Prix was due to be reintroduced to the calendar after a 38-year absence. The venue hosting the round was to be the new Kymi Ring, instead of the Pyynikki Circuit used in 1962 and 1963, or the Imatra Circuit which hosted the round until 1982. The Finnish Grand Prix had been included on the 2020 calendar, but the inaugural race was cancelled in response to the COVID-19 pandemic.
- The Czech Republic Grand Prix was initially left off the provisional calendar, as the circuit requires mandatory resurfacing for safety compliance, and it was unclear if the necessary work could be completed in time for its typical schedule date in early August. The 11th round of the championship was therefore left open as provisionally pending. On 8 December 2020, Brno city councillors opted out of the 2021 calendar, citing financial difficulties due to the COVID-19 pandemic. It marked the first absence of a Grand Prix in Brno since 1992. The mayor of Brno hopes for the return of the championship in 2022.

==== Calendar changes as a reaction to COVID-19 pandemic ====
- With the uncertainty of the development of the COVID-19 pandemic, championship organizer Dorna elected in November 2020 to nominate three "Reserve Grand Prix Venues" which could be used in the event that local virus containment measures or regulations force the cancellation of a planned Grand Prix.
  - The Portuguese Grand Prix at Algarve had previously returned to the schedule as a replacement race for the final round of the COVID-19 shortened 2020 season.
  - The Indonesian Grand Prix was originally planned to be reintroduced to the main calendar after a 23-year absence before being designated a Reserve Grand Prix for 2021. The venue hosting the round would be the new Mandalika International Street Circuit, instead of the Sentul International Circuit used in 1996 and 1997.
  - A Russian Grand Prix would see the inaugural motorcycle Grand Prix in that country. The Igora Drive circuit would be used.
- On 22 January 2021, Dorna significantly updated the provisional calendar including the following changes:
  - The Argentine and American Grands Prix would be postponed due to the COVID-19 situation in both countries, with potential rescheduling for the final quarter of 2021.
  - A double-header would open the season in Qatar on 28 March and 4 April, followed by Portugal as the third round.
  - The provisionally pending race created by the absence of the Czech Grand Prix was removed.
  - The potential Russian Grand Prix was removed from the reserve list, leaving Indonesia as the sole Reserve Grand Prix Venue.
- On 14 May the Finnish Grand Prix was cancelled due to the COVID-19 situation, and the Styrian Grand Prix would replace it on the date of 8 August. It was also confirmed that the Indonesian Grand Prix would remain a reserve Grand Prix in the 2021 calendar, subject to circuit homologation.
- On 23 June the Japanese Grand Prix was cancelled due to the COVID-19 situation, with the previously postponed Grand Prix of the Americas taking its place in the calendar. This also led to the postponement of the Thailand Grand Prix by one week.
- On 6 July the Australian Grand Prix was cancelled due to the COVID-19 situation, with the Malaysian Grand Prix brought forward by a week to replace it on the date of 24 October. In addition, a new Grand Prix, the Algarve Grand Prix, was introduced, which is scheduled to be held on 7 November.
- On 21 July the Thailand Grand Prix was cancelled due to the COVID-19 restrictions in the country.
- On 19 August the Malaysian Grand Prix was cancelled due to the COVID-19 restrictions in the country. For its replacement, a second Grand Prix at Misano was introduced, having the same schedule as the cancelled Malaysian round.
- On 11 September the final championship calendar comprising 18 Grands Prix was confirmed. The Emilia Romagna and Rimini Riviera Grand Prix returned as the second Grand Prix at Misano, now having the shortened name of Emilia Romagna Grand Prix. The previously postponed Argentine Grand Prix was also cancelled.

== Results and standings ==
=== Grands Prix ===
Round	Grand Prix	Pole position	Fastest lap	Winning rider	Winning team	Winning constructor	Report
1	Qatar motorcycle Grand Prix	(United Kingdom) Sam Lowes	(Australia) Remy Gardner	(United Kingdom) Sam Lowes	(Belgium) Elf Marc VDS Racing Team	(Germany) Kalex	Report
2	(Qatar) Doha motorcycle Grand Prix	(United Kingdom) Sam Lowes	(United Kingdom) Sam Lowes	(United Kingdom) Sam Lowes	(Belgium) Elf Marc VDS Racing Team	(Germany) Kalex	Report
3	(Portugal) Portuguese motorcycle Grand Prix	(United Kingdom) Sam Lowes	(Spain) Raúl Fernández	(Spain) Raúl Fernández	(Finland) Red Bull KTM Ajo	(Germany) Kalex	Report
4	(Spain) Spanish motorcycle Grand Prix	(Australia) Remy Gardner	(United Kingdom) Sam Lowes	(Italy) Fabio Di Giannantonio	(Italy) Federal Oil Gresini Moto2	(Germany) Kalex	Report
5	(France) French motorcycle Grand Prix	(Spain) Raúl Fernández	(Australia) Remy Gardner	(Spain) Raúl Fernández	(Finland) Red Bull KTM Ajo	(Germany) Kalex	Report
6	(Italy) Italian motorcycle Grand Prix	(Spain) Raúl Fernández	(United Kingdom) Sam Lowes	(Australia) Remy Gardner	(Finland) Red Bull KTM Ajo	(Germany) Kalex	Report
7	(Catalonia) Catalan motorcycle Grand Prix	(Australia) Remy Gardner	(Spain) Raúl Fernández	(Australia) Remy Gardner	(Finland) Red Bull KTM Ajo	(Germany) Kalex	Report
8	(Germany) German motorcycle Grand Prix	(Spain) Raúl Fernández	(Australia) Remy Gardner	(Australia) Remy Gardner	(Finland) Red Bull KTM Ajo	(Germany) Kalex	Report
9	(Netherlands) Dutch TT	(Spain) Raúl Fernández	(Spain) Raúl Fernández	(Spain) Raúl Fernández	(Finland) Red Bull KTM Ajo	(Germany) Kalex	Report
10	(Styria) Styrian motorcycle Grand Prix	(Australia) Remy Gardner	(Japan) Ai Ogura	(Italy) Marco Bezzecchi	(Italy) Sky Racing Team VR46	(Germany) Kalex	Report
11	(Austria) Austrian motorcycle Grand Prix	(United Kingdom) Sam Lowes	(Thailand) Somkiat Chantra	(Spain) Raúl Fernández	(Finland) Red Bull KTM Ajo	(Germany) Kalex	Report
12	(United Kingdom) British motorcycle Grand Prix	(Italy) Marco Bezzecchi	(Spain) Jorge Navarro	(Australia) Remy Gardner	(Finland) Red Bull KTM Ajo	(Germany) Kalex	Report
13	Aragon motorcycle Grand Prix	(United Kingdom) Sam Lowes	(Spain) Raúl Fernández	(Spain) Raúl Fernández	(Finland) Red Bull KTM Ajo	(Germany) Kalex	Report
14	San Marino and Rimini Riviera motorcycle Grand Prix	(Spain) Raúl Fernández	(Spain) Raúl Fernández	(Spain) Raúl Fernández	(Finland) Red Bull KTM Ajo	(Germany) Kalex	Report
15	(United States) Motorcycle Grand Prix of the Americas	(Spain) Raúl Fernández	(Spain) Raúl Fernández	(Spain) Raúl Fernández	(Finland) Red Bull KTM Ajo	(Germany) Kalex	Report
16	(Emilia-Romagna) Emilia Romagna motorcycle Grand Prix	(United Kingdom) Sam Lowes	(Spain) Augusto Fernández	(United Kingdom) Sam Lowes	(Belgium) Elf Marc VDS Racing Team	(Germany) Kalex	Report
17	(Portugal) Algarve motorcycle Grand Prix	(Spain) Raúl Fernández	(United States) Cameron Beaubier	(Australia) Remy Gardner	(Finland) Red Bull KTM Ajo	(Germany) Kalex	Report
18	Valencian Community motorcycle Grand Prix	(Italy) Simone Corsi	(Spain) Raúl Fernández	(Spain) Raúl Fernández	(Finland) Red Bull KTM Ajo	(Germany) Kalex	Report

=== Riders' standings ===
Scoring system

Points were awarded to the top fifteen finishers. A rider had to finish the race to earn points.

Position	1st	2nd	3rd	4th	5th	6th	7th	8th	9th	10th	11th	12th	13th	14th	15th
Points	25	20	16	13	11	10	9	8	7	6	5	4	3	2	1

Pos.	Rider	Bike	Team	QAT (Qatar)	DOH (Qatar)	POR (Portugal)	SPA (Spain)	FRA (France)	ITA (Italy)	CAT (Catalonia)	GER (Germany)	NED (Netherlands)	STY (Styria)	AUT (Austria)	GBR (United Kingdom)	ARA (Aragon)	RSM (San Marino)	AME (United States)	EMI (Emilia-Romagna)	ALR (Portugal)	VAL (Valencian Community)	Pts
1	(Australia) Remy Gardner	Kalex	Red Bull KTM Ajo	2^{F}	2	3	4^{P}	2^{F}	1	1^{P}	1^{F}	2	4^{P}	7	1	2	2	Ret	7	1	10	311
2	(Spain) Raúl Fernández	Kalex	Red Bull KTM Ajo	5	3	1^{F}	5	1^{P}	2^{P}	2^{F}	Ret^{P}	1^{P F}	7	1	Ret	1^{F}	1^{P F}	1^{P F}	Ret	2^{P}	1^{F}	307
3	(Italy) Marco Bezzecchi	Kalex	Sky Racing Team VR46	4	4	6	2	3	3	4	3	5	1	10	2^{P}	Ret	5	3	Ret	8	20	214
4	(United Kingdom) Sam Lowes	Kalex	Elf Marc VDS Racing Team	1^{P}	1^{P F}	Ret^{P}	3^{F}	Ret	Ret^{F}	7	5	4	14	4^{P}	4	Ret^{P}	4	Ret	1^{P}	3	7	190
5	(Spain) Augusto Fernández	Kalex	Elf Marc VDS Racing Team	14	6	5	Ret	Ret	Ret	5	Ret	3	3	3	6	3	6	4	2^{F}	9	3	174
6	(Spain) Arón Canet	Boscoscuro	Aspar Team Moto2	13	Ret	2	9	Ret	11	Ret	2	Ret	2	8	7	5	3	11	3	4	5	164
7	(Italy) Fabio Di Giannantonio	Kalex	Federal Oil Gresini Moto2	3	10	11	1	8	Ret	Ret	4	Ret	13	12	5	6	9	2	8	11	2	161
8	(Japan) Ai Ogura	Kalex	Idemitsu Honda Team Asia	17	5	Ret	7	7	6	Ret	Ret	6	5^{F}	2	9	8	7	7	9	Ret		120
9	(Spain) Jorge Navarro	Boscoscuro	Speed Up Racing	10	13	22	12	10	Ret	11	7	7	20	Ret	3^{F}	4	13	12	5	7	8	106
10	(Germany) Marcel Schrötter	Kalex	Liqui Moly Intact GP	8	Ret	10	10	6	5	8	6	9	10	23	13	11	12	Ret	15	10	9	98
11	(Spain) Xavi Vierge	Kalex	Petronas Sprinta Racing	Ret	9	7	6	Ret	Ret	3	Ret	8	9	14	8	Ret	8	8	Ret	Ret	6	93
12	(Italy) Celestino Vietti	Kalex	Sky Racing Team VR46	12	7	Ret	18	19	16	14	15	10	6	6	12	15	10	Ret	4	6	4	89
13	(United States) Joe Roberts	Kalex	Italtrans Racing Team	6	Ret	4	8	Ret	4	10	Ret	Ret	Ret	16	10	13	23	18	DNS	24	DNS	59
14	(Italy) Tony Arbolino	Kalex	Liqui Moly Intact GP	16	11	16	21	4	7	13	16	Ret	17	13	18	9	15	6	Ret	20	23	51
15	(United States) Cameron Beaubier	Kalex	American Racing	11	Ret	9	Ret	Ret	8	19	10	16	Ret	20	Ret	14	21	5	Ret	5^{F}	21	50
16	(Netherlands) Bo Bendsneyder	Kalex	Pertamina Mandalika SAG Team	9	12	Ret	14	5	15	6	13	15	23	17	15	Ret	25	15	12	15	25	46
17	(Spain) Marcos Ramírez	Kalex	American Racing	Ret	WD	15	11	13	Ret	Ret	9	20	19	Ret	20	12	14	9	10	14	14	39
18	(Thailand) Somkiat Chantra	Kalex	Idemitsu Honda Team Asia	Ret	19	21	Ret	12	18	9	18	11	8	5^{F}	17	Ret	Ret	14	Ret	DSQ	19	37
19	(Italy) Stefano Manzi	Kalex	Flexbox HP40	19	8	Ret	13	Ret	10	24	20	13	18	24	Ret	18	16	19	6	13	13	36
20	(United Kingdom) Jake Dixon	Kalex	Petronas Sprinta Racing	7	Ret	Ret	DNS	18	14	18	21	18	11	11			19	10	13	Ret	16	30
21	(Spain) Albert Arenas	Boscoscuro	Aspar Team Moto2	21	15	13	Ret	14	Ret	12	8	12	15	Ret	19	Ret	22	Ret	11	Ret	22	28
22	(Switzerland) Thomas Lüthi	Kalex	Pertamina Mandalika SAG Team	15	Ret	17	19	Ret	DNS	15	19	14	16	9	11	Ret	11	Ret	14	19	12	27
23	(Spain) Héctor Garzó	Kalex	Flexbox HP40	Ret	16	8	Ret	Ret	13	Ret		DNS	Ret	15	Ret	Ret	20	Ret	Ret	12	Ret	16
24	(Italy) Simone Corsi	MV Agusta	MV Agusta Forward Racing	DNS			Ret	9	Ret	16	Ret	21	25	19	22	10	Ret	13	19	17	DNS^{P}	16
25	(Spain) Fermín Aldeguer	Boscoscuro	Speed Up Racing						12		Ret				16	7		21	16	16	17	13
26	(Italy) Nicolò Bulega	Kalex	Federal Oil Gresini Moto2	22	17	Ret	Ret	11	DNS	17	11	19	22	22	14	Ret	17	DNS	18	22	24	12
27	(Italy) Lorenzo Dalla Porta	Kalex	Italtrans Racing Team	18	14	12	16	DSQ	Ret	Ret	Ret	Ret	12	Ret	DNS	Ret	Ret					10
28	(Malaysia) Hafizh Syahrin	NTS	NTS RW Racing GP	Ret	21	18	17	15	9	20	17	23	Ret	18	21	19	18	20		18	15	9
29	(Japan) Tetsuta Nagashima	Kalex	Italtrans Racing Team															16		21	11	5
30	(Spain) Alonso López	Boscoscuro	Speed Up Racing					Ret		21		17										4
30	(Spain) Alonso López	Kalex	Flexbox HP40								12											4
31	(Italy) Lorenzo Baldassarri	MV Agusta	MV Agusta Forward Racing	Ret	20	14	15	17	Ret	23	Ret		21	DNS	Ret		24	22	20	Ret	DNS	3
32	(Belgium) Barry Baltus	NTS	NTS RW Racing GP	DNS				16	17	22	14	24	Ret	Ret	23	16	Ret	17	17	23	18	2
33	(Spain) Manuel González	MV Agusta	MV Agusta Forward Racing									22				17						0
34	(Italy) Yari Montella	Boscoscuro	Speed Up Racing	20	18	Ret	20	WD					24	Ret			Ret					0
35	(Italy) Tommaso Marcon	MV Agusta	MV Agusta Forward Racing		Ret		23	20	19													0
35	(Italy) Tommaso Marcon	NTS	NTS RW Racing GP																Ret			0
36	(Spain) Miquel Pons	MV Agusta	MV Agusta Forward Racing			19																0
37	(United Kingdom) John McPhee	Kalex	Petronas Sprinta Racing													20						0
38	(United Kingdom) Fraser Rogers	NTS	NTS RW Racing GP			20																0
39	(Japan) Taiga Hada	NTS	NTS RW Racing GP				22															0
39	(Japan) Taiga Hada	Kalex	Pertamina Mandalika SAG Teluru											21								0
40	(Andorra) Xavier Cardelús	Kalex	Cerba Promoracing Team													21						0
41	(Poland) Piotr Biesiekirski	Kalex	Pertamina Mandalika SAG Euvic							25						Ret				25		0
42	(Thailand) Keminth Kubo	Kalex	VR46 Master Camp Team							26												0
	(Indonesia) Dimas Ekky Pratama	Kalex	Pertamina Mandalika SAG Team																		Ret	0
	(Italy) Mattia Casadei	Kalex	Italtrans Racing Team																Ret			0
	(Malaysia) Adam Norrodin	Kalex	Petronas Sprinta Racing												Ret							0
Pos.	Rider	Bike	Team	QAT (Qatar)	DOH (Qatar)	POR (Portugal)	SPA (Spain)	FRA (France)	ITA (Italy)	CAT (Catalonia)	GER (Germany)	NED (Netherlands)	STY (Styria)	AUT (Austria)	GBR (United Kingdom)	ARA (Aragon)	RSM (San Marino)	AME (United States)	EMI (Emilia-Romagna)	ALR (Portugal)	VAL (Valencian Community)	Pts

Race key
Colour	Result
Gold	Winner
Silver	2nd place
Bronze	3rd place
Green	Points finish
Blue	Non-points finish
Blue	Non-classified finish (NC)
Purple	Retired (Ret)
Red	Did not qualify (DNQ)
Black	Disqualified (DSQ)
White	Did not start (DNS)
White	Withdrew (WD)
White	Race cancelled (C)
Blank	Did not practice (DNP)
Blank	Excluded (EX)
Blank	Did not arrive (DNA)
Blank	Did not enter (empty cell)
Annotation	Meaning
P	Pole position
F	Fastest lap
Rider key
Colour	Meaning
Light blue	Rookie rider

=== Constructors' standings ===
Each constructor received the same number of points as their best placed rider in each race.

Pos.	Constructor	QAT (Qatar)	DOH (Qatar)	POR (Portugal)	SPA (Spain)	FRA (France)	ITA (Italy)	CAT (Catalonia)	GER (Germany)	NED (Netherlands)	STY (Styria)	AUT (Austria)	GBR (United Kingdom)	ARA (Aragon)	RSM (San Marino)	AME (United States)	EMI (Emilia-Romagna)	ALR (Portugal)	VAL (Valencian Community)	Pts
1	(Germany) Kalex	1	1	1	1	1	1	1	1	1	1	1	1	1	1	1	1	1	1	450
2	(Italy) Boscoscuro	10	13	2	9	10	11	11	2	7	2	8	3	4	3	11	3	4	5	199
3	(Italy) MV Agusta	Ret	20	14	15	9	19	16	Ret	21	21	19	22	10	24	13	19	17	DNS	19
4	(Japan) NTS	Ret	21	18	17	15	9	20	14	23	Ret	18	21	16	18	17	17	18	15	11
Pos.	Constructor	QAT (Qatar)	DOH (Qatar)	POR (Portugal)	SPA (Spain)	FRA (France)	ITA (Italy)	CAT (Catalonia)	GER (Germany)	NED (Netherlands)	STY (Styria)	AUT (Austria)	GBR (United Kingdom)	ARA (Aragon)	RSM (San Marino)	AME (United States)	EMI (Emilia-Romagna)	ALR (Portugal)	VAL (Valencian Community)	Pts

=== Teams' standings ===
The teams' standings were based on results obtained by regular and substitute riders; wild-card entries were ineligible.

Pos.	Team	Bike No.	QAT (Qatar)	DOH (Qatar)	POR (Portugal)	SPA (Spain)	FRA (France)	ITA (Italy)	CAT (Catalonia)	GER (Germany)	NED (Netherlands)	STY (Styria)	AUT (Austria)	GBR (United Kingdom)	ARA (Aragon)	RSM (San Marino)	AME (United States)	EMI (Emilia-Romagna)	ALR (Portugal)	VAL (Valencian Community)	Pts
1	(Finland) Red Bull KTM Ajo	25	5	3	1^{F}	5	1^{P}	2^{P}	2^{F}	Ret^{P}	1^{P F}	7	1	Ret	1^{F}	1^{P F}	1^{P F}	Ret	2^{P}	1^{F}	618
1	(Finland) Red Bull KTM Ajo	87	2^{F}	2	3	4^{P}	2^{F}	1	1^{P}	1^{F}	2	4^{P}	7	1	2	2	Ret	7	1	10	618
2	(Belgium) Elf Marc VDS Racing Team	22	1^{P}	1^{P F}	Ret^{P}	3^{F}	Ret	Ret^{F}	7	5	4	14	4^{P}	4	Ret^{P}	4	Ret	1^{P}	3	7	364
2	(Belgium) Elf Marc VDS Racing Team	37	14	6	5	Ret	Ret	Ret	5	Ret	3	3	3	6	3	6	4	2^{F}	9	3	364
3	(Italy) Sky Racing Team VR46	13	12	7	Ret	18	19	16	14	15	10	6	6	12	15	10	Ret	4	6	4	303
3	(Italy) Sky Racing Team VR46	72	4	4	6	2	3	3	4	3	5	1	10	2^{P}	Ret	5	3	Ret	8	20	303
4	(Spain) Inde Aspar Team	44	13	Ret	2	9	Ret	11	Ret	2	Ret	2	8	7	5	3	11	3	4	5	192
4	(Spain) Inde Aspar Team	75	21	15	13	Ret	14	Ret	12	8	12	15	Ret	19	Ret	22	Ret	11	Ret	22	192
5	(Italy) Federal Oil Gresini Moto2	11	22	17	Ret	Ret	11	DNS	17	11	19	Ret	22	14	Ret	17	DNS	18	22	24	173
5	(Italy) Federal Oil Gresini Moto2	21	3	10	11	1	8	Ret	Ret	4	Ret	13	12	5	6	9	2	8	11	2	173
6	(Japan) Idemitsu Honda Team Asia	35	Ret	19	21	Ret	12	18	9	18	11	8	5^{F}	17	Ret	Ret	14	Ret	DSQ	19	157
6	(Japan) Idemitsu Honda Team Asia	79	17	5	Ret	7	7	6	Ret	Ret	6	5^{F}	2	9	8	7	7	9	Ret		157
7	(Germany) Liqui Moly Intact GP	14	16	11	16	21	4	7	13	16	Ret	17	13	18	9	15	6	Ret	20	23	149
7	(Germany) Liqui Moly Intact GP	23	8	Ret	10	10	6	5	8	6	9	10	23	13	11	12	Ret	15	10	9	149
8	(Malaysia) Petronas Sprinta Racing	17													20						123
8	(Malaysia) Petronas Sprinta Racing	77												Ret							123
8	(Malaysia) Petronas Sprinta Racing	96	7	Ret	Ret	DNS	18	14	18	21	18	11	11			19	10	13	Ret	16	123
8	(Malaysia) Petronas Sprinta Racing	97	Ret	9	7	6	Ret	Ret	3	Ret	8	9	14	8	Ret	8	8	Ret	Ret	6	123
9	(Italy) Termozeta Speed Up	2					Ret		21		17										119
9	(Italy) Termozeta Speed Up	5	20	18	Ret	20	WD					24	Ret			Ret					119
9	(Italy) Termozeta Speed Up	9	10	13	22	12	10	Ret	11	7	7	20	Ret	3^{F}	4	13	12	5	7	8	119
9	(Italy) Termozeta Speed Up	54						12		Ret				16	7		21	16	16	17	119
10	(United States) American Racing	6	11	Ret	9	Ret	Ret	8	19	10	16	Ret	20	Ret	14	21	5	Ret	5^{F}	21	89
10	(United States) American Racing	42	Ret	WD	15	11	13	Ret	Ret	9	20	19	Ret	20	12	14	9	10	14	14	89
11	(Italy) Italtrans Racing Team	16	6	Ret	4	8	Ret	4	10	Ret	Ret	Ret	16	10	13	23	18	DNS	24	DNS	74
11	(Italy) Italtrans Racing Team	19	18	14	12	16	DSQ	Ret	Ret	Ret	Ret	12	Ret	DNS	Ret	Ret					74
11	(Italy) Italtrans Racing Team	27																Ret			74
11	(Italy) Italtrans Racing Team	45															16		21	11	74
12	(Indonesia) Pertamina Mandalika SAG Team	12	15	Ret	17	19	Ret	DNS	15	19	14	16	9	11	Ret	11	Ret	14	19	12	73
12	(Indonesia) Pertamina Mandalika SAG Team	64	9	12	Ret	14	5	15	6	13	15	23	17	15	Ret	25	15	12	15	25	73
13	(Spain) Flexbox HP40	2								12											56
13	(Spain) Flexbox HP40	40	Ret	16	8	Ret	Ret	13	Ret		DNS	Ret	15	Ret	Ret	20	Ret	Ret	12	Ret	56
13	(Spain) Flexbox HP40	62	19	8	Ret	13	Ret	10	24	20	13	18	24	Ret	18	16	19	6	13	13	56
14	(Switzerland) MV Agusta Forward Racing	7	Ret	20	14	15	17	Ret	23	Ret		21	DNS	Ret		24	22	20	Ret	DNS	19
14	(Switzerland) MV Agusta Forward Racing	10		Ret																	19
14	(Switzerland) MV Agusta Forward Racing	18 (Note: González used number 81 during the Aragon Grand Prix (round 13) as the number 18 was used by Xavi Cardelús who raced as a wildcard during the round.)									22				17						19
14	(Switzerland) MV Agusta Forward Racing	24	DNS			Ret	9	Ret	16	Ret	21	25	19	22	10	Ret	13	19	17	DNS^{P}	19
14	(Switzerland) MV Agusta Forward Racing	77			19																19
15	(Netherlands) NTS RW Racing GP	10																Ret			11
15	(Netherlands) NTS RW Racing GP	32				22															11
15	(Netherlands) NTS RW Racing GP	55	Ret	21	18	17	15	9	20	17	23	Ret	18	21	19	18	20		18	15	11
15	(Netherlands) NTS RW Racing GP	70	DNS				16	17	22	14	24	Ret	Ret	23	16	Ret	17	17	23	18	11
15	(Netherlands) NTS RW Racing GP	89			20																11
Pos.	Team	Bike No.	QAT (Qatar)	DOH (Qatar)	POR (Portugal)	SPA (Spain)	FRA (France)	ITA (Italy)	CAT (Catalonia)	GER (Germany)	NED (Netherlands)	STY (Styria)	AUT (Austria)	GBR (United Kingdom)	ARA (Aragon)	RSM (San Marino)	AME (United States)	EMI (Emilia-Romagna)	ALR (Portugal)	VAL (Valencian Community)	Pts
