= MotoE World Championship =

Electric motorcycle racing series

- MotoE World Championship logo
- Category: Motorcycle racing
- Region: Europe
- Inaugural season: 2019
- Folded: 2025 (hiatus)
- Constructors: Ducati
- Tyre suppliers: Michelin
- Last Riders' champion: Alessandro Zaccone
- Last Teams' champion: LCR E-Team
- Official website: motogp.com

MotoE World Cup logo from 2019 to 2022.

The FIM Enel MotoE World Championship (formerly known as the MotoE World Cup) is a class of motorcycle racing that uses only electric motorcycles. The series is sanctioned by the Fédération Internationale de Motocyclisme (FIM) and supported MotoGP at selected European rounds.

Having run as a World Cup from 2019 until 2022, MotoE officially gained World Championship status starting in 2023. The series was put on hiatus after the 2025 season.

== Technical specifications ==
The series has used the Energica Ego Corsa motorcycle since inception, manufactured by Energica Motor Company, but changed to Ducati from 2023.

- Motor: Synchronous oil-cooled AC with permanent magnets
- Maximum Continuous Power: 120 kW (160 hp/cv)
- Acceleration: 0–100 km/h in three seconds
- Top Speed: 270 km/h
- Torque: 200 N•m (147.5 lb•ft) at 5,000 rpm
- Frame: Tubular steel trellis
- Weight: 258–280 kg
- Swingarm: Cast aluminium
- Brakes: Brembo package: 330mm steel discs, Nickel-plated four-piston monoblock calipers, Z04 pads, and Brembo master-cylinder
- Wheels: Marchesini 7-spoke forged aluminium rims
- Throttle: Ride-by-wire
- Battery: Low-voltage lithium-ion
- Recharging: 0-85 percent in about 20 minutes, via the integrated DC fast charging technology developed by CCS Combo

== Seasons ==
=== 2019 ===
The inaugural season took place over 6 rounds between July and November 2019 with 12 teams fielding a grid of 18 riders. The season start was originally planned for May, but had to be postponed because of a fire at the Jerez test in March where all competition bikes were destroyed. A new schedule was announced in late March of six races at four venues starting in July. Italian rider Matteo Ferrari from the Trentino Gresini MotoE became the first MotoE champion.

=== 2020 ===
The second season was contested over 7 rounds at 3 different circuits. Because of the COVID-19 pandemic the season had to be postponed until July when it started at Jerez. The season champion was Jordi Torres in his first season in the electric class, after achieving four podium finishes including one win. Runners-up Matteo Ferrari and Dominique Aegerter also tallied four podiums including two wins each, but suffered from retirements and low classifications at the remaining races.

=== 2021 ===
The third season was contested over seven races at six different locations. Belgian team Marc VDS withdrew from the series, citing scheduling conflicts. Seven races were scheduled for the season, starting in May in Jerez. Spanish rider Jordi Torres won the championship a second time, successfully defending his 2020 title.

=== 2022 ===
The fourth season was contested over twelve races at six different locations. Dominique Aegerter won the championship.

=== 2023 ===
The MotoE has officially gained World Championship status. Mattia Casadei won the championship.

=== 2024 ===
The sixth season, the second with World Championship status, was contested over sixteen races at eight different locations. Héctor Garzó won the championship.

=== 2025 ===
On 11 September 2025, it was announced that the FIM and Dorna Sports agreed to put the MotoE class on hiatus after the 2025 season. Alessandro Zaccone won the championship.

== List of MotoE champions ==
Season	Number of rounds	Number of races	Riders' champion	Teams' champion
MotoE World Cup
2019	4	6	(Italy) Matteo Ferrari	not awarded
2020	5	7	(Spain) Jordi Torres	not awarded
2021	6	7	(Spain) Jordi Torres (2)	not awarded
2022	6	12	(Switzerland) Dominique Aegerter	not awarded
MotoE World Championship
2023	8	16	(Italy) Mattia Casadei	(Spain) HP Pons Los40
2024	8	16	(Spain) Héctor Garzó	(Germany) Dynavolt Intact GP MotoE
2025	7	14	(Italy) Alessandro Zaccone	(Monaco) LCR E-Team

== Calendar ==
=== By race title ===
eRace	Circuit	Races per season							Total e-race events
eRace	Circuit	2019	2020	2021	2022	2023	2024	2025	Total e-race events
(Germany) German eRace	Sachsenring, Hohenstein-Ernstthal	1				2	2		5
(Austria) Austrian eRace	Red Bull Ring, Spielberg	1		1	2	2	2	2	10
San Marino and Rimini Riviera eRace	Misano World Circuit, Misano Adriatico	2	1	2	2	2	2	2	13
Valencian Community eRace	Circuit Ricardo Tormo, Valencia	2							2
(Spain) Spanish eRace	Circuito de Jerez, Jerez de la Frontera		1	1	2				4
(Andalusia) Andalusian eRace	Circuito de Jerez, Jerez de la Frontera		1						1
(Emilia-Romagna) Emilia Romagna and Rimini Riviera eRace	Misano World Circuit, Misano Adriatico		2						2
(France) French eRace	Bugatti Circuit, Le Mans		2	1	2	2	2	2	11
(Catalonia) Catalan eRace	Circuit de Barcelona-Catalunya, Montmeló			1		2	2	2	7
(Netherlands) Dutch eRace	TT Circuit Assen, Assen			1	2	2	2	2	9
(Italy) Italian eRace	Mugello Circuit, Scarperia e San Piero				2	2	2		6
(United Kingdom) British eRace	Silverstone Circuit, Silverstone					2			2
(Portugal) Portuguese eRace	Algarve International Circuit, Portimão						2	2	4
(Hungary) Hungarian eRace	Balaton Park Circuit, Balatonfőkajár							2	2
Total		6	7	7	12	16	16	14	

== See also ==
- FIM eRoad Racing World Cup
- Electric motorsport
