= 2023 Catalan motorcycle Grand Prix =

Motorcycle races in Montmeló

(Catalonia) 2023 Catalan Grand Prix
Race details
- Race 11 of 20 races in the 2023 Grand Prix motorcycle racing season
- Date: 2–3 September 2023
- Official name: Gran Premi Monster Energy de Catalunya
- Location: Circuit de Barcelona-Catalunya; Montmeló, Spain
- Course: Permanent racing facility; 4.657 km (2.894 mi)

MotoGP
Pole position
Rider	(Italy) Francesco Bagnaia	Ducati
Time	1:38.639	
Fastest lap
Rider	(Spain) Maverick Viñales	Aprilia
Time	1:40.343 on lap 3	
Podium
First	(Spain) Aleix Espargaró	Aprilia
Second	(Spain) Maverick Viñales	Aprilia
Third	(Spain) Jorge Martín	Ducati

Moto2
Pole position
Rider	(United Kingdom) Jake Dixon	Kalex
Time	1:44.089	
Fastest lap
Rider	(Spain) Pedro Acosta	Kalex
Time	1:44.384 on lap 2	
Podium
First	(United Kingdom) Jake Dixon	Kalex
Second	(Spain) Arón Canet	Kalex
Third	(Spain) Albert Arenas	Kalex

Moto3
Pole position
Rider	(Turkey) Deniz Öncü (Note: Iván Ortolá set the fastest time in qualifying and started the race from pole position but almost a month after was disqualified, along with Joel Kelso, from qualifying and the race for failing oil sample tests. Deniz Öncü, who qualified and started second, inherited the pole position statistic.)	KTM
Time	1:48.509	
Fastest lap
Rider	(Spain) Daniel Holgado	KTM
Time	1:48.902 on lap 2	
Podium
First	(Colombia) David Alonso	Gas Gas
Second	(Spain) Jaume Masià	Honda
Third	(Spain) José Antonio Rueda	KTM

MotoE Race 1
Pole position
Rider	(Spain) Jordi Torres	Ducati
Time	1:48.731	
Fastest lap
Rider	(Spain) Jordi Torres	Ducati
Time	1:48.377 on lap 2	
Podium
First	(Italy) Andrea Mantovani	Ducati
Second	(Italy) Mattia Casadei	Ducati
Third	(Spain) Héctor Garzó	Ducati

MotoE Race 2
Pole position
Rider	(Spain) Jordi Torres	Ducati
Time	1:48.731	
Fastest lap
Rider	(Spain) Héctor Garzó	Ducati
Time	1:48.551 on lap 3	
Podium
First	(Italy) Mattia Casadei	Ducati
Second	(Italy) Andrea Mantovani	Ducati
Third	(Italy) Nicholas Spinelli	Ducati

The 2023 Catalan motorcycle Grand Prix (officially known as the Gran Premi Monster Energy de Catalunya) was the eleventh round of the 2023 Grand Prix motorcycle racing season and the seventh round of the 2023 MotoE World Championship. All races (except for both MotoE races which were held on 2 September) were held at the Circuit de Barcelona-Catalunya in Montmeló on 3 September 2023.

== Practice ==
=== MotoGP ===
==== Practice ====
The top ten riders (written in bold) qualified for Q2.

Pos.	No.	Biker	Constructor	
Pos.	No.	Biker	Constructor	Time results
1	41	**(Spain) Aleix Espargaró**	**Aprilia**	**1:38.686**
2	12	**(Spain) Maverick Viñales**	**Aprilia**	**1:39.048**
3	1	**(Italy) Francesco Bagnaia**	**Ducati**	**1:39.061**
4	5	**(France) Johann Zarco**	**Ducati**	**1:39.257**
5	33	**(South Africa) Brad Binder**	**KTM**	**1:39.346**
6	73	**(Spain) Álex Márquez**	**Ducati**	**1:39.549**
7	72	**(Italy) Marco Bezzecchi**	**Ducati**	**1:39.550**
8	49	**(Italy) Fabio Di Giannantonio**	**Ducati**	**1:39.621**
9	23	**(Italy) Enea Bastianini**	**Ducati**	**1:39.628**
10	89	**(Spain) Jorge Martín**	**Ducati**	**1:39.693**
11	44	(Spain) Pol Espargaró	KTM	1:39.721
12	43	(Australia) Jack Miller	KTM	1:39.752
13	25	(Spain) Raúl Fernández	Aprilia	1:39.757
14	88	(Portugal) Miguel Oliveira	Aprilia	1:39.779
15	10	(Italy) Luca Marini	Ducati	1:39.807
16	37	(Spain) Augusto Fernández	KTM	1:39.891
17	20	(France) Fabio Quartararo	Yamaha	1:40.106
18	21	(Italy) Franco Morbidelli	Yamaha	1:40.155
19	93	(Spain) Marc Márquez	Honda	1:40.249
20	30	(Japan) Takaaki Nakagami	Honda	1:40.886
21	27	(Spain) Iker Lecuona	Honda	1:40.895
22	36	(Spain) Joan Mir	Honda	1:41.013
OFFICIAL MOTOGP PRACTICE TIMES REPORT

== Qualifying ==
=== MotoGP ===
Fastest session lap

Pos.	No.	Biker	Constructor	Qualifying times		Final grid	Row
Pos.	No.	Biker	Constructor	Q1	Q2	Final grid	Row
1	1	(Italy) Francesco Bagnaia	Ducati	Qualified in Q2	1:38.639	1	1
2	41	(Spain) Aleix Espargaró	Aprilia	Qualified in Q2	1:38.743	2	1
3	88	(Portugal) Miguel Oliveira	Aprilia	1:38.789	1:38.748	3	1
4	12	(Spain) Maverick Viñales	Aprilia	Qualified in Q2	1:38.772	4	2
5	89	(Spain) Jorge Martín	Ducati	Qualified in Q2	1:38.797	5	2
6	5	(France) Johann Zarco	Ducati	Qualified in Q2	1:38.858	6	2
7	73	(Spain) Álex Márquez	Ducati	Qualified in Q2	1:39.053	7	3
8	49	(Italy) Fabio Di Giannantonio	Ducati	Qualified in Q2	1:39.054	8	3
9	33	(South Africa) Brad Binder	KTM	Qualified in Q2	1:39.057	9	3
10	72	(Italy) Marco Bezzecchi	Ducati	Qualified in Q2	1:39.368	10	4
11	23	(Italy) Enea Bastianini	Ducati	Qualified in Q2	1:39.575	14 (Note: Three-place grid penalty for riding slowly on the racing line and blocking another rider during FP1.)	5
12	93	(Spain) Marc Márquez	Honda	1:39.070	1:39.701	11	4
13	43	(Australia) Jack Miller	KTM	1:39.232	N/A	12	4
14	44	(Spain) Pol Espargaró	KTM	1:39.330	N/A	13	5
15	25	(Spain) Raúl Fernández	Aprilia	1:39.360	N/A	15	5
16	21	(Italy) Franco Morbidelli	Yamaha	1:39.452	N/A	16	6
17	20	(France) Fabio Quartararo	Yamaha	1:39.510	N/A	17	6
18	10	(Italy) Luca Marini	Ducati	1:39.573	N/A	18	6
19	37	(Spain) Augusto Fernández	KTM	1:39.794	N/A	19	7
20	36	(Spain) Joan Mir	Honda	1:40.214	N/A	20	7
21	30	(Japan) Takaaki Nakagami	Honda	1:40.388	N/A	21	7
22	27	(Spain) Iker Lecuona	Honda	1:40.580	N/A	22	8
OFFICIAL MOTOGP QUALIFYING RESULTS

=== Moto2 ===
Fastest session lap

Pos.	No.	Biker	Constructor	Qualifying times		Final grid	Row
Pos.	No.	Biker	Constructor	Q1	Q2	Final grid	Row
1	96	(United Kingdom) Jake Dixon	Kalex	Qualified in Q2	1:44.089	1	1
2	40	(Spain) Arón Canet	Kalex	Qualified in Q2	1:44.184	2	1
3	79	(Japan) Ai Ogura	Kalex	Qualified in Q2	1:44.214	3	1
4	18	(Spain) Manuel González	Kalex	Qualified in Q2	1:44.215	4	2
5	75	(Netherlands) Albert Arenas	Kalex	Qualified in Q2	1:44.270	5	2
6	54	(Spain) Fermín Aldeguer	Boscoscuro	Qualified in Q2	1:44.276	6	2
7	21	(Spain) Alonso López	Boscoscuro	Qualified in Q2	1:44.344	7	3
8	11	(Spain) Sergio García	Kalex	1:44.873	1:44.374	8	3
9	37	(Spain) Pedro Acosta	Kalex	Qualified in Q2	1:44.373	9	3
10	7	(Belgium) Barry Baltus	Kalex	1:44.927	1:44.419	10	4
11	22	(United Kingdom) Sam Lowes	Kalex	Qualified in Q2	1:44.458	11	4
12	35	(Thailand) Somkiat Chantra	Kalex	1:44.797	1:44.470	12	4
13	12	(Czech Republic) Filip Salač	Kalex	1:44.926	1:44.490	13	5
14	16	(United States) Joe Roberts	Kalex	Qualified in Q2	1:44.682	14	5
15	13	(Italy) Celestino Vietti	Kalex	Qualified in Q2	1:44.838	15	5
16	52	(Spain) Jeremy Alcoba	Kalex	Qualified in Q2	1:44.906	16	6
17	84	(Netherlands) Zonta van den Goorbergh	Kalex	Qualified in Q2	1:44.983	17	6
18	42	(Spain) Marcos Ramírez	Forward	Qualified in Q2	1:45.202	18	6
19	64	(Netherlands) Bo Bendsneyder	Kalex	1:44.930	N/A	19	7
20	14	(Italy) Tony Arbolino	Kalex	1:45.021	N/A	20	7
21	8	(Australia) Senna Agius	Kalex	1:45.104	N/A	21	7
22	3	(Germany) Lukas Tulovic	Kalex	1:45.220	N/A	22	8
23	71	(Italy) Dennis Foggia	Kalex	1:45.248	N/A	23	8
24	72	(Spain) Borja Gómez	Kalex	1:45.314	N/A	27 (Note: Three-place grid penalty.)	8
25	33	(United Kingdom) Rory Skinner	Kalex	1:45.607	N/A	24	9
26	73	(Italy) Mattia Rato	Kalex	1:45.784	N/A	25	9
27	67	(Italy) Alberto Surra	Forward	1:45.905	N/A	26	9
28	28	(Spain) Izan Guevara	Kalex	1:45.950	N/A	28	10
29	5	(Japan) Kohta Nozane	Kalex	1:45.983	N/A	29	10
30	55	(Spain) Yeray Ruiz	Forward	1:46.321	N/A	30	10
OFFICIAL MOTO2 QUALIFYING RESULTS

=== Moto3 ===
Fastest session lap

Pos.	No.	Biker	Constructor	Qualifying times		Final grid	Row
Pos.	No.	Biker	Constructor	Q1	Q2	Final grid	Row
1	48	(Spain) Iván Ortolá	KTM	Qualified in Q2	1:48.205	1	1
2	53	(Turkey) Deniz Öncü	KTM	Qualified in Q2	1:48.509	2	1
3	66	(Australia) Joel Kelso	CFMoto	1:49.329	1:48.583	3	1
4	5	(Spain) Jaume Masià	Honda	Qualified in Q2	1:48.641	4	2
5	18	(Italy) Matteo Bertelle	Honda	Qualified in Q2	1:48.654	5	2
6	24	(Japan) Tatsuki Suzuki	Honda	Qualified in Q2	1:48.743	6	2
7	99	(Spain) José Antonio Rueda	KTM	Qualified in Q2	1:48.758	7	3
8	82	(Italy) Stefano Nepa	KTM	Qualified in Q2	1:48.904	8	3
9	27	(Japan) Kaito Toba	Honda	Qualified in Q2	1:48.932	9	3
10	54	(Italy) Riccardo Rossi	Honda	Qualified in Q2	1:49.031	10	4
11	96	(Spain) Daniel Holgado	KTM	1:49.077	1:49.055	11	4
12	80	(Colombia) David Alonso	Gas Gas	Qualified in Q2	1:49.065	12	4
13	71	(Japan) Ayumu Sasaki	Husqvarna	Qualified in Q2	1:49.178	13	5
14	72	(Japan) Taiyo Furusato	Honda	1:49.413	1:49.211	14	5
15	55	(Italy) Romano Fenati	Honda	Qualified in Q2	1:49.315	30 (Note: Back of the grid start penalty.)	5
16	19	(United Kingdom) Scott Ogden	Honda	1:49.451	1:49.362	15	6
17	7	(Italy) Filippo Farioli	KTM	Qualified in Q2	1:49.996	16	6
18	95	(Netherlands) Collin Veijer	Husqvarna	Qualified in Q2	1:50.346	17	6
19	10	(Brazil) Diogo Moreira	KTM	Qualified in Q2	1:49.657	18	7
20	38	(Spain) David Salvador	KTM	1:49.756	N/A	19	7
21	44	(Spain) David Muñoz	Honda	1:49.840	N/A	20	7
22	6	(Japan) Ryusei Yamanaka	Gas Gas	1:50.182	N/A	21	8
23	64	(Indonesia) Mario Aji	Honda	1:50.254	N/A	22	8
24	43	(Spain) Xavier Artigas	CFMoto	1:50.261	N/A	23	8
25	92	(Spain) David Almansa	Husqvarna	1:50.291	N/A	24	9
26	20	(France) Lorenzo Fellon	KTM	1:50.309	N/A	25	9
27	33	(Thailand) Tatchakorn Buasri	Honda	1:50.404	N/A	26	9
28	70	(United Kingdom) Joshua Whatley	Honda	1:50.443	N/A	27	10
29	22	(Spain) Ana Carrasco	KTM	1:50.523	N/A	28	10
30	63	(Malaysia) Syarifuddin Azman	KTM	1:50.847	N/A	29	10
OFFICIAL MOTO3 QUALIFYING RESULTS

== MotoGP Sprint ==
The MotoGP Sprint was held on 2 September.

Pos.	No.	Rider	Team	Constructor	Laps	Time/Retired	Grid	Points
1	41	(Spain) Aleix Espargaró	Aprilia Racing	Aprilia	12	20:02.744	2	12
2	1	(Italy) Francesco Bagnaia	Ducati Lenovo Team	Ducati	12	+1.989	1	9
3	12	(Spain) Maverick Viñales	Aprilia Racing	Aprilia	12	+2.040	4	7
4	33	(South Africa) Brad Binder	Red Bull KTM Factory Racing	KTM	12	+2.857	9	6
5	89	(Spain) Jorge Martín	Prima Pramac Racing	Ducati	12	+4.341	5	5
6	88	(Portugal) Miguel Oliveira	CryptoData RNF MotoGP Team	Aprilia	12	+4.940	3	4
7	5	(France) Johann Zarco	Prima Pramac Racing	Ducati	12	+6.746	6	3
8	72	(Italy) Marco Bezzecchi	Mooney VR46 Racing Team	Ducati	12	+6.888	10	2
9	23	(Italy) Enea Bastianini	Ducati Lenovo Team	Ducati	12	+8.068	11	1
10	73	(Spain) Álex Márquez	Gresini Racing MotoGP	Ducati	12	+10.380	7	
11	93	(Spain) Marc Márquez	Repsol Honda Team	Honda	12	+11.823	12	
12	10	(Italy) Luca Marini	Mooney VR46 Racing Team	Ducati	12	+11.900	18	
13	49	(Italy) Fabio Di Giannantonio	Gresini Racing MotoGP	Ducati	12	+12.018	8	
14	25	(Spain) Raúl Fernández	CryptoData RNF MotoGP Team	Aprilia	12	+13.284	15	
15	21	(Italy) Franco Morbidelli	Monster Energy Yamaha MotoGP	Yamaha	12	+16.207	16	
16	43	(Australia) Jack Miller	Red Bull KTM Factory Racing	KTM	12	+16.404	13	
17	37	(Spain) Augusto Fernández	GasGas Factory Racing Tech3	KTM	12	+16.534	19	
18	20	(France) Fabio Quartararo	Monster Energy Yamaha MotoGP	Yamaha	12	+17.147	17	
19	27	(Spain) Iker Lecuona	LCR Honda Castrol	Honda	12	+18.658	22	
20	30	(Japan) Takaaki Nakagami	LCR Honda Idemitsu	Honda	12	+19.080	21	
21	36	(Spain) Joan Mir	Repsol Honda Team	Honda	12	+19.574	20	
Ret	44	(Spain) Pol Espargaró	GasGas Factory Racing Tech3	KTM	3	Accident	14	
Fastest sprint lap: (Spain) Aleix Espargaró (Aprilia) – 1:39.327 (lap 3)
OFFICIAL MOTOGP SPRINT REPORT

== Warm up practice ==
=== MotoGP ===
Maverick Viñales set the best time 1:40.082 and was the fastest rider at this session ahead of Aleix Espargaró and Franco Morbidelli.

== Race ==
=== MotoGP ===
The race, scheduled to be run for 24 laps, was red-flagged after multiple crashes at turns 1 and 2 during the first lap. The race was later restarted over 23 laps with the original starting grid.

Pos.	No.	Rider	Team	Constructor	Laps	Time/Retired	Grid	Points
1	41	(Spain) Aleix Espargaró	Aprilia Racing	Aprilia	23	38:56.159	2	25
2	12	(Spain) Maverick Viñales	Aprilia Racing	Aprilia	23	+0.377	4	20
3	89	(Spain) Jorge Martín	Prima Pramac Racing	Ducati	23	+2.831	5	16
4	5	(France) Johann Zarco	Prima Pramac Racing	Ducati	23	+4.867	6	13
5	88	(Portugal) Miguel Oliveira	CryptoData RNF MotoGP Team	Aprilia	23	+7.529	3	11
6	73	(Spain) Álex Márquez	Gresini Racing MotoGP	Ducati	23	+10.590	7	10
7	20	(France) Fabio Quartararo	Monster Energy Yamaha MotoGP	Yamaha	23	+10.821	17	9
8	43	(Australia) Jack Miller	Red Bull KTM Factory Racing	KTM	23	+10.880	12	8
9	37	(Spain) Augusto Fernández	GasGas Factory Racing Tech3	KTM	23	+12.889	19	7
10	49	(Italy) Fabio Di Giannantonio	Gresini Racing MotoGP	Ducati	23	+13.280	8	6
11	10	(Italy) Luca Marini	Mooney VR46 Racing Team	Ducati	23	+16.491	18	5
12	72	(Italy) Marco Bezzecchi	Mooney VR46 Racing Team	Ducati	23	+16.561	10	4
13	93	(Spain) Marc Márquez	Repsol Honda Team	Honda	23	+21.616	11	3
14	21	(Italy) Franco Morbidelli	Monster Energy Yamaha MotoGP	Yamaha	23	+23.108	16	2
15	30	(Japan) Takaaki Nakagami	LCR Honda Idemitsu	Honda	23	+26.740	21	1
16	27	(Spain) Iker Lecuona	LCR Honda Castrol	Honda	23	+28.860	22	
17	36	(Spain) Joan Mir	Repsol Honda Team	Honda	23	+33.929	20	
Ret	25	(Spain) Raúl Fernández	CryptoData RNF MotoGP Team	Aprilia	10	Technical issue	15	
Ret	33	(South Africa) Brad Binder	Red Bull KTM Factory Racing	KTM	3	Technical issue	9	
Ret	44	(Spain) Pol Espargaró	GasGas Factory Racing Tech3	KTM	1	Technical issue	13	
DNS	1	(Italy) Francesco Bagnaia	Ducati Lenovo Team	Ducati		Did not restart	1	
DNS	23	(Italy) Enea Bastianini	Ducati Lenovo Team	Ducati		Did not restart	14	
Fastest lap: (Spain) Maverick Viñales (Aprilia) – 1:40.343 (lap 3)
OFFICIAL MOTOGP RACE REPORT

=== Moto2 ===
Pos.	No.	Rider	Constructor	Laps	Time/Retired	Grid	Points
1	96	(United Kingdom) Jake Dixon	Kalex	21	36:51.330	1	25
2	40	(Spain) Arón Canet	Kalex	21	+0.205	2	20
3	75	(Spain) Albert Arenas	Kalex	21	+1.027	5	16
4	11	(Spain) Sergio García	Kalex	21	+2.258	8	13
5	18	(Spain) Manuel González	Kalex	21	+2.662	4	11
6	37	(Spain) Pedro Acosta	Kalex	21	+3.664	9	10
7	79	(Japan) Ai Ogura	Kalex	21	+4.239	3	9
8	21	(Spain) Alonso López	Boscoscuro	21	+4.314	7	8
9	22	(United Kingdom) Sam Lowes	Kalex	21	+4.607	11	7
10	13	(Italy) Celestino Vietti	Kalex	21	+8.729	15	6
11	16	(United States) Joe Roberts	Kalex	21	+9.476	14	5
12	7	(Belgium) Barry Baltus	Kalex	21	+9.596	10	4
13	54	(Spain) Fermín Aldeguer	Boscoscuro	21	+9.821	6	3
14	35	(Thailand) Somkiat Chantra	Kalex	21	+10.970	12	2
15	52	(Spain) Jeremy Alcoba	Kalex	21	+11.183	16	1
16	24	(Spain) Marcos Ramírez	Kalex	21	+11.315	18	
17	14	(Italy) Tony Arbolino	Kalex	21	+16.859	20	
18	84	(Netherlands) Zonta van den Goorbergh	Kalex	21	+18.347	17	
19	3	(Germany) Lukas Tulovic	Kalex	21	+25.537	22	
20	72	(Spain) Borja Gómez	Kalex	21	+25.788	27	
21	71	(Italy) Dennis Foggia	Kalex	21	+26.188	23	
22	73	(Italy) Mattia Rato	Kalex	21	+29.443	25	
23	33	(United Kingdom) Rory Skinner	Kalex	21	+35.208	24	
24	5	(Japan) Kohta Nozane	Kalex	21	+39.363	29	
25	28	(Spain) Izan Guevara	Kalex	21	+52.086	28	
26	55	(Spain) Yeray Ruiz	Forward	21	+53.208	30	
Ret	12	(Czech Republic) Filip Salač	Kalex	16	Retired	13	
Ret	64	(Netherlands) Bo Bendsneyder	Kalex	8	Retired	19	
Ret	8	(Australia) Senna Agius	Kalex	7	Accident	21	
Ret	67	(Italy) Alberto Surra	Forward	0	Mechanical	26	
Fastest lap: (Spain) Pedro Acosta (Kalex) – 1:44.384 (lap 2)
OFFICIAL MOTO2 RACE REPORT

=== Moto3 ===
Pos.	No.	Rider	Constructor	Laps	Time/Retired	Grid	Points
1	80	(Colombia) David Alonso	Gas Gas	18	33:00.945	12	25
2	5	(Spain) Jaume Masià	Honda	18	+0.076	4	20
3	99	(Spain) José Antonio Rueda	KTM	18	+0.234	7	16
4	71	(Japan) Ayumu Sasaki	Husqvarna	18	+0.289	13	13
5	82	(Italy) Stefano Nepa	KTM	18	+0.401	8	11
6	54	(Italy) Riccardo Rossi	Honda	18	+0.524	10	10
7	27	(Japan) Kaito Toba	Honda	18	+0.680	9	9
8	24	(Japan) Tatsuki Suzuki	Honda	18	+0.967	6	8
9	6	(Japan) Ryusei Yamanaka	Gas Gas	18	+1.060	20	7
10	18	(Italy) Matteo Bertelle	Honda	18	+1.304	5	6
11	53	(Turkey) Deniz Öncü	KTM	18	+6.129 (Note: Six-second penalty for irresponsible riding.)	2	5
12	43	(Spain) Xavier Artigas	CFMoto	18	+6.458	22	4
13	72	(Japan) Taiyo Furusato	Honda	18	+6.485	14	3
14	55	(Italy) Romano Fenati	Honda	18	+6.964	29	2
15 (Note: One position penalty for exceeding track limits on the final lap.)	19	(United Kingdom) Scott Ogden	Honda	18	+6.679	15	1
16	10	(Brazil) Diogo Moreira	KTM	18	+7.024	17	
17	64	(Indonesia) Mario Aji	Honda	18	+7.150	21	
18	33	(Thailand) Tatchakorn Buasri	Honda	18	+7.170	25	
19	38	(Spain) David Salvador	KTM	18	+10.354	18	
20	96	(Spain) Daniel Holgado	KTM	18	+14.757	11	
21	70	(United Kingdom) Joshua Whatley	Honda	18	+18.755	26	
22	92	(Spain) David Almansa	Husqvarna	18	+18.800	23	
23	20	(France) Lorenzo Fellon	KTM	18	+27.664	24	
24	63	(Malaysia) Syarifuddin Azman	KTM	18	+32.185	28	
25	22	(Spain) Ana Carrasco	KTM	18	+32.287	27	
Ret	44	(Spain) David Muñoz	KTM	17	Collision	19	
Ret	7	(Italy) Filippo Farioli	KTM	4	Accident	16	
DNS	95	(Netherlands) Collin Veijer	Husqvarna		Did not start		
DSQ	48	(Spain) Iván Ortolá	KTM		Technical infringement		
DSQ	66	(Australia) Joel Kelso	CFMoto		Technical infringement		
Fastest lap: (Spain) Daniel Holgado (KTM) – 1:48.902 (lap 2)
OFFICIAL MOTO3 RACE REPORT

- Collin Veijer was declared unfit after an x-ray showed a left foot fracture and subsequently withdrew from the race.
- Iván Ortolá and Joel Kelso originally finished 10th and 18th in the race, respectively, but were disqualified from the results of the whole weekend after having found to have used an oil outside of the Moto3 technical specifications. Ortolá's pole position statistic was also nullified due to the disqualification; Deniz Öncü inherited the pole position statistic.

=== MotoE ===
==== Race 1 ====
Pos.	No.	Rider	Laps	Time/Retired	Grid	Points
1	9	(Italy) Andrea Mantovani	7	12:47.539	3	25
2	40	(Italy) Mattia Casadei	7	+0.044	2	20
3	4	(Spain) Héctor Garzó	7	+0.230	7	16
4	11	(Italy) Matteo Ferrari	7	+0.950	6	13
5	29	(Italy) Nicholas Spinelli	7	+1.011	8	11
6	3	(Switzerland) Randy Krummenacher	7	+2.129	11	10
7	81	(Spain) Jordi Torres	7	+2.524	1	9
8	77	(Spain) Miquel Pons	7	+2.962	5	8
9	61	(Italy) Alessandro Zaccone	7	+3.102	9	7
10	34	(Italy) Kevin Manfredi	7	+3.379	14	6
11	21	(Italy) Kevin Zannoni	7	+6.106	4	5
12	51	(Brazil) Eric Granado	7	+9.173	10	4
13	78	(Japan) Hikari Okubo	7	+11.958	18	3
14	99	(Spain) Oscar Gutiérrez	7	+12.075 (Note: Three-second penalty for making a shortcut at turn 2.)	12	2
15	72	(Italy) Alessio Finello	7	+12.197	13	1
16	6	(Spain) María Herrera	7	+16.270	16	
Ret	8	(Spain) Mika Pérez	4	Accident	15	
EX	53	(Spain) Tito Rabat	0	Excluded	17	
Fastest lap: (Spain) Jordi Torres – 1:48.377 (lap 2)
OFFICIAL MOTOE RACE NR.1 REPORT

- All bikes manufactured by Ducati.

==== Race 2 ====
Pos.	No.	Rider	Laps	Time/Retired	Grid	Points
1	40	(Italy) Mattia Casadei	7	12:47.019	2	25
2	9	(Italy) Andrea Mantovani	7	+0.072	3	20
3	29	(Italy) Nicholas Spinelli	7	+0.388	8	16
4	4	(Spain) Héctor Garzó	7	+0.424	7	13
5	11	(Italy) Matteo Ferrari	7	+0.498	6	11
6	77	(Spain) Miquel Pons	7	+1.071	5	10
7	21	(Italy) Kevin Zannoni	7	+1.208	4	9
8	61	(Italy) Alessandro Zaccone	7	+1.801	9	8
9	3	(Switzerland) Randy Krummenacher	7	+2.596	11	7
10	51	(Brazil) Eric Granado	7	+4.458	10	6
11	99	(Spain) Oscar Gutiérrez	7	+4.654	12	5
12	34	(Italy) Kevin Manfredi	7	+6.389	14	4
13	78	(Japan) Hikari Okubo	7	+11.180	18	3
14	8	(Spain) Mika Pérez	7	+11.236	15	2
15	72	(Italy) Alessio Finello	7	+15.523	13	1
16	6	(Spain) María Herrera	7	+15.670	16	
Ret	81	(Spain) Jordi Torres	5	Accident	1	
Ret	53	(Spain) Tito Rabat	4	Accident	17	
Fastest lap: (Spain) Héctor Garzó – 1:48.551 (lap 3)
OFFICIAL MOTOE RACE NR.2 REPORT

- All bikes manufactured by Ducati.

== Championship standings after the race ==
Below are the standings for the top five riders, constructors, and teams after the round.

=== MotoGP ===
Riders' Championship standings

	Pos.	Rider	Points
	1	(Italy) Francesco Bagnaia	260
	2	(Spain) Jorge Martín	210
	3	(Italy) Marco Bezzecchi	189
	4	(South Africa) Brad Binder	166
2	5	(Spain) Aleix Espargaró	154

Constructors' Championship standings

	Pos.	Constructor	Points
	1	(Italy) Ducati	379
	2	(Austria) KTM	215
	3	(Italy) Aprilia	203
1	4	(Japan) Yamaha	102
1	5	(Japan) Honda	96

Teams' Championship standings

Pos.	Team	Points
1	(Italy) Prima Pramac Racing	351
2	(Italy) Mooney VR46 Racing Team	314
3	(Italy) Ducati Lenovo Team	295
4	(Austria) Red Bull KTM Factory Racing	270
5	(Italy) Aprilia Racing	267

=== Moto2 ===
Riders' Championship standings

Pos.	Rider	Points
1	(Spain) Pedro Acosta	186
2	(Italy) Tony Arbolino	164
3	(United Kingdom) Jake Dixon	142
4	(Spain) Arón Canet	116
5	(Spain) Alonso López	100

Constructors' Championship standings

Pos.	Constructor	Points
1	(Germany) Kalex	270
2	(Italy) Boscoscuro	139

Teams' Championship standings

	Pos.	Team	Points
1	1	(Finland) Red Bull KTM Ajo	245
1	2	(Belgium) Elf Marc VDS Racing Team	238
	3	(Italy) Beta Tools Speed Up	184
	4	(Spain) Pons Wegow Los40	174
1	5	(Spain) Asterius GasGas Aspar Team	145

=== Moto3 ===
Riders' Championship standings

	Pos.	Rider	Points
	1	(Spain) Daniel Holgado	161
	2	(Japan) Ayumu Sasaki	148
	3	(Turkey) Deniz Öncü	129
1	4	(Spain) Jaume Masià	129
1	5	(Spain) Iván Ortolá	118

Constructors' Championship standings

Pos.	Constructor	Points
1	(Austria) KTM	243
2	(Japan) Honda	170
3	(Sweden) Husqvarna	151
4	(Spain) Gas Gas	132
5	(China) CFMoto	66

Teams' Championship standings

	Pos.	Team	Points
	1	(Finland) Red Bull KTM Ajo	210
	2	(Germany) Liqui Moly Husqvarna Intact GP	195
	3	(Italy) Angeluss MTA Team	185
1	4	(Luxembourg) Leopard Racing	178
1	5	(Spain) Gaviota GasGas Aspar Team	167

=== MotoE ===
Riders' Championship standings

	Pos.	Rider	Points
1	1	(Italy) Mattia Casadei	219
1	2	(Spain) Jordi Torres	198
	3	(Italy) Matteo Ferrari	197
	4	(Spain) Héctor Garzó	175
	5	(Switzerland) Randy Krummenacher	154

Teams' Championship standings

	Pos.	Team	Points
	1	(Germany) Dynavolt Intact GP MotoE	329
	2	(Spain) HP Pons Los40	328
1	3	(Italy) Felo Gresini MotoE	227
1	4	(Monaco) LCR E-Team	227
1	5	(Italy) Ongetta Sic58 Squadracorse	213

== Notes ==
Previous race: 2023 Austrian Grand Prix	FIM Grand Prix World Championship; 2023 season	Next race: 2023 San Marino Grand Prix
Previous race: 2022 Catalan Grand Prix	Catalan motorcycle Grand Prix	Next race: 2024 Catalan Grand Prix
