= 2022 San Marino and Rimini Riviera motorcycle Grand Prix =

Motorcycle race in Misano Adriatico

2022 San Marino and Rimini Riviera Grand Prix
Race details
- Race 14 of 20 races in the 2022 Grand Prix motorcycle racing season
- Date: 3–4 September 2022
- Official name: Gran Premio Gryfyn di San Marino e della Riviera di Rimini
- Location: Misano World Circuit Marco Simoncelli; Misano Adriatico, Province of Rimini, Italy
- Course: Permanent racing facility; 4.226 km (2.626 mi)

MotoGP
Pole position
Rider	(Australia) Jack Miller	Ducati
Time	1:31.899	
Fastest lap
Rider	(Italy) Enea Bastianini	Ducati
Time	1:31.868 on lap 27	
Podium
First	(Italy) Francesco Bagnaia	Ducati
Second	(Italy) Enea Bastianini	Ducati
Third	(Spain) Maverick Viñales	Aprilia

Moto2
Pole position
Rider	(Italy) Celestino Vietti	Kalex
Time	1:35.996	
Fastest lap
Rider	(Japan) Ai Ogura	Kalex
Time	1:36.867 on lap 4	
Podium
First	(Spain) Alonso López	Boscoscuro
Second	(Spain) Arón Canet	Kalex
Third	(Spain) Augusto Fernández	Kalex

Moto3
Pole position
Rider	(Turkey) Deniz Öncü	KTM
Time	1:42.448	
Fastest lap
Rider	(Italy) Dennis Foggia	Honda
Time	1:41.740 on lap 9	
Podium
First	(Italy) Dennis Foggia	Honda
Second	(Spain) Jaume Masià	KTM
Third	(Spain) Izan Guevara	Gas Gas

MotoE Race 1
Pole position
Rider	(Switzerland) Dominique Aegerter	Energica
Time	1:43.174	
Fastest lap
Rider	(Italy) Matteo Ferrari	Energica
Time	1:43.212 on lap 2	
Podium
First	(Italy) Mattia Casadei	Energica
Second	(Switzerland) Dominique Aegerter	Energica
Third	(Italy) Matteo Ferrari	Energica

MotoE Race 2
Pole position
Rider	(Switzerland) Dominique Aegerter	Energica
Time	1:43.174	
Fastest lap
Rider	(Italy) Matteo Ferrari	Energica
Time	1:42.904 on lap 3	
Podium
First	(Italy) Matteo Ferrari	Energica
Second	(Italy) Mattia Casadei	Energica
Third	(Brazil) Eric Granado	Energica

The 2022 San Marino and Rimini Riviera motorcycle Grand Prix (officially known as the Gran Premio Gryfyn di San Marino e della Riviera di Rimini) was the fourteenth round of the 2022 Grand Prix motorcycle racing season, and the sixth and final round of the 2022 MotoE World Cup. All races (except MotoE race 1 which was held on 3 September) were held at the Misano World Circuit Marco Simoncelli in Misano Adriatico on 4 September 2022.

The two independent Ducati teams, Gresini Racing and Mooney VR46 Racing Team used a special livery in this race. Gresini Racing uses a special livery as a form of respect for the late Fausto Gresini. Meanwhile, Mooney VR46 Racing Team wears a special livery to continue Valentino Rossi's tradition of using a helmet with a special design every race in Italy. The special livery called Aeroprism was designed by Michah Dowbak aka Mad Dog Jones. Some of the designs are inspired by the livery that Valentino Rossi used at Mugello in 1999 when he was still in the 250cc class.

== Background ==
=== Riders' entries ===
In the MotoGP class, in addition to Stefan Bradl who continues to replace Marc Márquez in the Repsol Honda Team, Kazuki Watanabe takes the place of Joan Mir in the Team Suzuki Ecstar, due to the ankle injury suffered by the Spanish rider in the Austrian Grand Prix; Michele Pirro runs for the fourth time this season as a wildcard. This is the last Grand Prix for Andrea Dovizioso who has decided to retire; for the remaining races the WithU Yamaha RNF MotoGP Team bike will be driven by test rider Cal Crutchlow. In the Moto2 class, two riders race with the wildcard: Rory Skinner, in the third consecutive race with American Racing, and Mattia Pasini, in his second season after Mugello, with GasGas Aspar Team. Australian driver Senna Agius (Elf Marc VDS Racing Team) and Japanese Taiga Hada (Pertamina Mandalika SAG Team) respectively replace the injured Sam Lowes and Gabriel Rodrigo. In the Moto3 class, the Italian Nicola Carraro continues to replace his compatriot Matteo Bertelle in the QJmotor Avintia Racing Team, while the Australian Harrison Voight runs as a wildcard in the Sic58 Squadra Corse. In the MotoE class, at the last two races of this edition, the riders are the same as in the entry list of the season with no further substitutes.

=== MotoGP Championship standings before the race ===
Fabio Quartararo increases his advantage over Aleix Espargaró in the riders' standings (200 points for the first, 168 for the second). The latter has twelve points ahead of Francesco Bagnaia, winner in Austria and his third consecutive success. Johann Zarco and Jack Miller are fourth and fifth with 125 and 123 points respectively. In the constructors' standings, Ducati continues to lead the standings with 296 points with a large advantage over their rivals: +96 on Yamaha, +111 on Aprilia, +156 on KTM, +178 on Suzuki and +206 on Honda. In the team standings, Ducati Lenovo Team overtakes Aprilia Racing in the lead (279 points for the former, 253 for the latter). Monster Energy Yamaha MotoGP is third with 226 points, with a lead of 14 and 34 points respectively over Prima Pramac Racing and Red Bull KTM Factory Racing.

=== Moto2 Championship standings before the race ===
In the riders' standings, Ai Ogura, thanks to Spielberg's victory, overtakes Augusto Fernández at the head by just one point (183 vs 182 points). Celestino Vietti is third with 156 points, followed by Arón Canet and Joe Roberts with 137 and 108 points respectively. In the constructors' classification, Kalex (who has already won the title arithmetically) has full points with 325 points, followed by Boscoscuro (86 points) and MV Agusta (5 points). In the team standings, Idemitsu Honda Team Asia overtook in first position (275 points) against Red Bull KTM Ajo, five points away. Flexbox HP40 is third with 212 points, with a lead of 52 and 53 points respectively over GasGas Aspar Team and Elf Marc VDS Racing Team.

=== Moto3 Championship standings before the race ===
Sergio García's advantage slightly increases (193 points) over his team-mate Izan Guevara, now five points behind the top of the riders' standings. Dennis Foggia (144 points), Ayumu Sasaki (winner in the previous race, 138 points) and Jaume Masià and Deniz Öncü (127 points either) follow. In the constructors' classification, the gap between Gas Gas (first at 246 points) and Honda (second at 226 points) is reduced to twenty. KTM is third with 210 points, Husqvarna is fourth with 167 points, CFMoto closes the ranking with 103 points. The team classification is largely led by GasGas Aspar Team with 381 points, with an advantage of 123 points over Leopard Racing; followed by Red Bull KTM Ajo, third at 183 points, Sterilgarda Husqvarna Max fourth at 178 points and Red Bull KTM Tech3 fifth at 156 points.

=== MotoE Cup standings before the race ===
Dominique Aegerter reaches the last two races in the lead with 194 points, with a 17.5 point lead over Eric Granado. Matteo Ferrari is third with 121.5 points, followed by Miquel Pons (115 points) and Mattia Casadei (111 points).

== Free practice ==
=== MotoGP ===
==== Combinated Free Practice 1-2-3 ====
The top ten riders (written in bold) qualified in Q2.

Fastest session lap

Pos.	No.	Biker	Constructor	Free practice times		
Pos.	No.	Biker	Constructor	FP1	FP2	FP3
1	43	**(Australia) Jack Miller**	**Ducati**	1:32:537	1:31.702	**1:31.296**
2	63	**(Italy) Francesco Bagnaia**	**Ducati**	1:32.752	1:31.631	**1:31.367**
3	23	**(Italy) Enea Bastianini**	**Ducati**	1:32.838	**1:31.517**	1:32.395
4	20	**(France) Fabio Quartararo**	**Yamaha**	1:32.313	1:31.843	**1:31.644**
5	42	**(Spain) Álex Rins**	**Suzuki**	1:32.858	1:32.365	**1:31.707**
6	5	**(France) Johann Zarco**	**Ducati**	1:32.999	**1:31.837**	1:32.350
7	12	**(Spain) Maverick Viñales**	**Aprilia**	1:32.706	1:31.882	**1:31.844**
8	41	**(Spain) Aleix Espargaró**	**Aprilia**	1:32.698	**1:31.929**	1:32.464
9	21	**(Italy) Franco Morbidelli**	**Yamaha**	1:33.562	1:32.242	**1:31.937**
10	88	**(Portugal) Miguel Oliveira**	**KTM**	1:33.636	1:32.330	**1:31.955**
11	72	(Italy) Marco Bezzecchi	Ducati	1:33.218	1:32.191	**1:31.956**
12	44	(Spain) Pol Espargaró	Honda	1:33.105	1:32.301	**1:32.075**
13	10	(Italy) Luca Marini	Ducati	1:32.981	1:32.749	**1:32.076**
14	73	(Spain) Álex Márquez	Honda	1:33.253	1:32.418	**1:32.122**
15	89	(Spain) Jorge Martín	Ducati	1:33.830	**1:32.166**	1:32.975
16	51	(Italy) Michele Pirro	Ducati	1:32.693	1:32.673	**1:32.263**
17	33	(South Africa) Brad Binder	KTM	1:33.207	**1:32.358**	1:32.520
18	49	(Italy) Fabio Di Giannantonio	Ducati	1:33.897	1:32.656	**1:32.417**
19	6	(Germany) Stefan Bradl	Honda	1:33.855	1:32.978	**1:32.462**
20	30	(Japan) Takaaki Nakagami	Honda	1:33.314	1:32.566	**1:32.506**
21	4	(Italy) Andrea Dovizioso	Yamaha	1:33.435	1:32.894	**1:32.716**
22	25	(Spain) Raúl Fernández	KTM	1:33.687	**1:33.200**	1:33.340
23	40	(South Africa) Darryn Binder	Yamaha	1:34.836	1:33.608	**1:33.240**
24	87	(Australia) Remy Gardner	KTM	1:34.165	1:33.559	**1:33.378**
25	92	(Japan) Kazuki Watanabe	Suzuki	1:37.294	1:36.019	**1:35.683**
OFFICIAL MOTOGP COMBINED FREE PRACTICE TIMES REPORT

=== Moto2 ===
==== Combinated Free Practice ====
The top fourteen riders (written in bold) qualified in Q2.

Fastest session lap

Pos.	No.	Biker	Constructor	Free practice times		
Pos.	No.	Biker	Constructor	FP1	FP2	FP3
1	21	**(Spain) Alonso López**	**Boscoscuro**	1:37:400	1:36.597	**1:36.107**
2	96	**(United Kingdom)** **Jake Dixon**	**Kalex**	1:36.716	1:36.692	**1:36.310**
3	40	**(Spain) Arón Canet**	**Kalex**	1:36.778	1:36.859	**1:36.355**
4	75	**(Spain) Albert Arenas**	**Kalex**	1:37.515	1:36.802	**1:36.367**
5	13	**(Italy)** **Celestino Vietti**	**Kalex**	1:36.573	1:37.137	**1:36.380**
6	37	**(Spain) Augusto Fernández**	**Kalex**	1:36.817	1:36.670	**1:36.386**
7	51	**(Spain) Pedro Acosta**	**Kalex**	1:37.420	1:36.928	**1:36.473**
8	54	**(Spain) Fermín Aldeguer**	**Boscoscuro**	1:37.321	1:37.314	**1:36.522**
9	35	**(Thailand)** **Somkiat Chantra**	**Kalex**	1:37.401	1:36.848	**1:36.524**
10	14	**(Italy)** **Tony Arbolino**	**Kalex**	1:37.251	1:36.935	**1:36.580**
11	11	(Italy) **Mattia Pasini**	**Kalex**	**1:36.668**	1:37.299	1:37.033
12	9	(Spain) **Jorge Navarro**	**Kalex**	1:37.686	1:37.439	**1:36.671**
13	79	(Japan) **Ai Ogura**	**Kalex**	1:37.041	1:36.962	**1:36.764**
14	12	(Czech Republic) **Filip Salač**	**Kalex**	1:37.519	1:36.973	**1:36.789**
15	64	(Netherlands) Bo Bendsneyder	Kalex	1:37.319	1:37.175	**1:36.861**
16	16	(United States) Joe Roberts	Kalex	1:37.352	1:37.591	**1:36.961**
17	7	(Belgium) Barry Baltus	Kalex	1:37.636	1:37.975	**1:36.993**
18	18	(Spain) Manuel González	Kalex	1:37.636	1:37.218	**1:37.126**
19	23	(Germany) Marcel Schrötter	Kalex	1:37.904	1:37.292	**1:37.146**
20	19	(Italy) Lorenzo Dalla Porta	Kalex	1:38.193	**1:37.162**	1:37.175
21	52	(Spain) Jeremy Alcoba	Kalex	1:38.605	1:37.964	**1:37.192**
22	28	(Italy) Niccolò Antonelli	Kalex	**1:37.279**	1:38.060	1:37.616
23	61	(Italy) Alessandro Zaccone	Kalex	1:38.392	1:38.633	**1:37.353**
24	6	(United States) Cameron Beaubier	Kalex	1:38.102	1:38.070	**1:37.459**
25	84	(Netherlands) Zonta van den Goorbergh	Kalex	1:37.946	1:37.857	**1:37.515**
26	8	(Australia) Senna Agius	Kalex	1:38.524	1:38.204	**1:37.814**
27	24	(Italy) Simone Corsi	MV Agusta	1:37.996	**1:37.991**	1:38.773
28	42	(Spain) Marcos Ramírez	MV Agusta	**1:37.998**	1:38.186	1:38.195
29	29	(Japan) Taiga Hada	Kalex	1:40.174	1:38.512	**1:38.273**
30	4	(United States) Sean Dylan Kelly	Kalex	1:39.467	1:39.081	**1:38.330**
31	81	(Thailand) Keminth Kubo	Kalex	1:39.001	**1:38.877**	1:38.926
OFFICIAL MOTO2 COMBINED FREE PRACTICE TIMES REPORT

== Qualifying ==
=== MotoGP ===
OFFICIAL MOTOGP QUALIFYING RESULTS

== Race ==
=== MotoGP ===
Pos.	No.	Biker	Team	Constructor	Laps	Time/Retired	Grid	Points
1	63	(Italy) Francesco Bagnaia	Ducati Lenovo Team	Ducati	27	41:43.199	5	25
2	23	(Italy) Enea Bastianini	Gresini Racing MotoGP	Ducati	27	+0.034	2	20
3	12	(Spain) Maverick Viñales	Aprilia Racing	Aprilia	27	+4.212	4	16
4	10	(Italy) Luca Marini	Mooney VR46 Racing Team	Ducati	27	+5.283	7	13
5	20	(France) Fabio Quartararo	Monster Energy Yamaha MotoGP	Yamaha	27	+5.771	8	11
6	41	(Spain) Aleix Espargaró	Aprilia Racing	Aprilia	27	+10.230	9	10
7	42	(Spain) Álex Rins	Team Suzuki Ecstar	Suzuki	27	+12.496	12	9
8	33	(South Africa) Brad Binder	Red Bull KTM Factory Racing	KTM	27	+14.661	15	8
9	89	(Spain) Jorge Martín	Prima Pramac Racing	Ducati	27	+17.732	13	7
10	73	(Spain) Álex Márquez	LCR Honda Castrol	Honda	27	+21.986	16	6
11	88	(Portugal) Miguel Oliveira	Red Bull KTM Factory Racing	KTM	27	+23.685	10	5
12	04	(Italy) Andrea Dovizioso	WithU Yamaha RNF MotoGP Team	Yamaha	27	+29.276	18	4
13	25	(Spain) Raúl Fernández	Tech3 KTM Factory Racing	KTM	27	+30.433	25	3
14	6	(Germany) Stefan Bradl	Repsol Honda Team	Honda	27	+31.768	20	2
15	30	(Japan) Takaaki Nakagami	LCR Honda Idemitsu	Honda	27	+32.547	22	1
16	40	(South Africa) Darryn Binder	WithU Yamaha RNF MotoGP Team	Yamaha	27	+41.857	21	
17	72	(Italy) Marco Bezzecchi	Mooney VR46 Racing Team	Ducati	27	+50.559	3	
18	43	(Australia) Jack Miller	Ducati Lenovo Team	Ducati	27	+53.371	1	
19	87	(Australia) Remy Gardner	Tech3 KTM Factory Racing	KTM	27	+56.613	24	
20	49	(Italy) Fabio Di Giannantonio	Gresini Racing MotoGP	Ducati	27	+57.304	14	
21	92	(Japan) Kazuki Watanabe	Team Suzuki Ecstar	Suzuki	26	+1 lap	23	
Ret	21	(Italy) Franco Morbidelli	Monster Energy Yamaha MotoGP	Yamaha	2	Accident	11	
Ret	5	(France) Johann Zarco	Prima Pramac Racing	Ducati	0	Collision	6	
Ret	51	(Italy) Michele Pirro	Aruba.it Racing	Ducati	0	Collision	17	
Ret	44	(Spain) Pol Espargaró	Repsol Honda Team	Honda	0	Collision	19	
Fastest lap: (Italy) Enea Bastianini (Ducati) – 1:31.868 (lap 27)
OFFICIAL MOTOGP RACE REPORT

=== Moto2 ===
Pos.	No.	Biker	Constructor	Laps	Time/Retired	Grid	Points
1	21	(Spain) Alonso López	Boscoscuro	25	40:35.332	3	25
2	40	(Spain) Arón Canet	Kalex	25	+1.253	4	20
3	37	(Spain) Augusto Fernández	Kalex	25	+3.305	9	16
4	75	(Spain) Albert Arenas	Kalex	25	+4.615	2	13
5	79	(Japan) Ai Ogura	Kalex	25	+9.166	8	11
6	51	(Spain) Pedro Acosta	Kalex	25	+10.339	13	10
7	14	(Italy) Tony Arbolino	Kalex	25	+10.434	5	9
8	35	(Thailand) Somkiat Chantra	Kalex	25	+12.377	11	8
9	16	(United States) Joe Roberts	Kalex	25	+18.242	15	7
10	52	(Spain) Jeremy Alcoba	Kalex	25	+19.560	21	6
11	23	(Germany) Marcel Schrötter	Kalex	25	+27.896	12	5
12	64	(Netherlands) Bo Bendsneyder	Kalex	25	+28.452	14	4
13	7	(Belgium) Barry Baltus	Kalex	25	+30.991	20	3
14	6	(United States) Cameron Beaubier	Kalex	25	+38.371	24	2
15	61	(Italy) Alessandro Zaccone	Kalex	25	+41.690	22	1
16	42	(Spain) Marcos Ramírez	MV Agusta	25	+42.209	27	
17	29	(Japan) Taiga Hada	Kalex	25	+1:09.174	28	
Ret	4	(United States) Sean Dylan Kelly	Kalex	18	Accident	29	
Ret	13	(Italy) Celestino Vietti	Kalex	14	Accident Damage	1	
Ret	11	(Italy) Mattia Pasini	Kalex	12	Accident	10	
Ret	28	(Italy) Niccolò Antonelli	Kalex	11	Accident	23	
Ret	24	(Italy) Simone Corsi	MV Agusta	9	Mechanical	30	
Ret	84	(Netherlands) Zonta van den Goorbergh	Kalex	9	Accident Damage	26	
Ret	54	(Spain) Fermín Aldeguer	Boscoscuro	9	Accident Damage	7	
Ret	19	(Italy) Lorenzo Dalla Porta	Kalex	6	Accident	6	
Ret	8	(Australia) Senna Agius	Kalex	5	Accident Damage	25	
Ret	9	(Spain) Jorge Navarro	Kalex	4	Accident	16	
Ret	12	(Czech Republic) Filip Salač	Kalex	4	Accident	17	
Ret	96	(United Kingdom) Jake Dixon	Kalex	0	Accident	18	
Ret	18	(Spain) Manuel González	Kalex	0	Accident	19	
Ret	81	(Thailand) Keminth Kubo	Kalex	0	Accident	31	
Fastest lap: (Japan) Ai Ogura (Kalex) – 1:36.867 (lap 4)
OFFICIAL MOTO2 RACE REPORT

=== Moto3 ===
Pos.	No.	Biker	Constructor	Laps	Time/Retired	Grid	Points
1	7	(Italy) Dennis Foggia	Honda	23	39:21.864	7	25
2	5	(Spain) Jaume Masià	KTM	23	+0.289	11	20
3	28	(Spain) Izan Guevara	Gas Gas	23	+0.334	5	16
4	53	(Turkey) Deniz Öncü	KTM	23	+0.453	1	13
5	96	(Spain) Daniel Holgado	KTM	23	+4.955	2	11
6	24	(Japan) Tatsuki Suzuki	Honda	23	+5.926	16	10
7	10	(Brazil) Diogo Moreira	KTM	23	+11.002	3	9
8	48	(Spain) Ivan Ortolá	KTM	23	+11.188	26	8
9	17	(United Kingdom) John McPhee	Husqvarna	23	+11.383	8	7
10	82	(Italy) Stefano Nepa	KTM	23	+11.494	12	6
11	54	(Italy) Riccardo Rossi	Honda	23	+11.560	14	5
12	44	(Spain) David Muñoz	KTM	23	+11.633	15	4
13	6	(Japan) Ryusei Yamanaka	KTM	23	+11.885	4	3
14	66	(Australia) Joel Kelso	KTM	23	+16.963	30	2
15	23	(Italy) Elia Bartolini	KTM	23	+19.888	21	1
16	31	(Spain) Adrián Fernández	KTM	23	+20.528	10	
17	67	(Italy) Alberto Surra	Honda	23	+20.728	19	
18	20	(France) Lorenzo Fellon	Honda	23	+20.805	18	
19	27	(Japan) Kaito Toba	KTM	23	+23.619	24	
20	43	(Spain) Xavier Artigas	CFMoto	23	+25.556	25	
21	72	(Japan) Taiyo Furusato	Honda	23	+35.326	27	
22	22	(Spain) Ana Carrasco	KTM	23	+49.990	31	
23	29	(Australia) Harrison Voight	KTM	23	+52.184	28	
24	70	(United Kingdom) Joshua Whatley	Honda	23	+56.428	29	
25	19	(United Kingdom) Scott Ogden	Honda	22	+1 lap	22	
Ret	99	(Spain) Carlos Tatay	CFMoto	21	Accident	6	
Ret	64	(Indonesia) Mario Aji	Honda	4	Accident	23	
Ret	16	(Italy) Andrea Migno	Honda	2	Accident	9	
Ret	71	(Japan) Ayumu Sasaki	Husqvarna	0	Collision	17	
Ret	9	(Italy) Nicola Carraro	KTM	0	Collision	20	
DSQ	11	(Spain) Sergio García	Gas Gas	14	Black flag	13	
Fastest lap: (Italy) Dennis Foggia (Honda) – 1:41.710 (lap 9)
OFFICIAL MOTO3 RACE REPORT

- Sergio García was black flagged for irresponsible riding.

=== MotoE ===
==== Race 1 ====
Pos.	No.	Biker	Laps	Time/Retired	Grid	Points
1	27	(Italy) Mattia Casadei	8	13:52.413	2	25
2	77	(Switzerland) Dominique Aegerter	8	+0.134	1	20
3	11	(Italy) Matteo Ferrari	8	+0.188	5	16
4	40	(Spain) Jordi Torres	8	+0.288	3	13
5	17	(Spain) Álex Escrig	8	+5.086	8	11
6	7	(Italy) Niccolò Canepa	8	+5.196	7	10
7	78	(Japan) Hikari Okubo	8	+5.534	11	9
8	34	(Italy) Kevin Manfredi	8	+6.904	12	8
9	10	(Andorra) Xavi Cardelús	8	+6.992	9	7
10	4	(Spain) Héctor Garzó	8	+7.158	13	6
11	21	(Italy) Kevin Zannoni	8	+11.016	10	5
12	38	(United Kingdom) Bradley Smith	8	+12.139	16	4
13	70	(Spain) Marc Alcoba	8	+12.527	18	3
14	6	(Spain) María Herrera	8	+12.563	15	2
15	12	(Spain) Xavi Forés	8	+18.666	14	1
16	72	(Italy) Alessio Finello	8	+22.819	17	
17	51	(Brazil) Eric Granado	8	+39.798	4	
Ret	71	(Spain) Miquel Pons	0	Accident	6	
Fastest lap: (Italy) Matteo Ferrari – 1:43.212 (lap 2)
OFFICIAL MOTOE RACE NR.1 REPORT

- All bikes manufactured by Energica.

==== Race 2 ====
Pos.	No.	Biker	Laps	Time/Retired	Grid	Points
1	11	(Italy) Matteo Ferrari	8	13:52.553	5	25
2	27	(Italy) Mattia Casadei	8	+0.195	2	20
3	51	(Brazil) Eric Granado	8	+0.673	4	16
4	77	(Switzerland) Dominique Aegerter	8	+1.092	1	13
5	40	(Spain) Jordi Torres	8	+1.304	3	11
6	7	(Italy) Niccolò Canepa	8	+2.876	7	10
7	71	(Spain) Miquel Pons	8	+4.249	6	9
8	17	(Spain) Álex Escrig	8	+5.762	8	8
9	78	(Japan) Hikari Okubo	8	+6.434	11	7
10	21	(Italy) Kevin Zannoni	8	+6.920	10	6
11	34	(Italy) Kevin Manfredi	8	+7.465	12	5
12	10	(Andorra) Xavi Cardelús	8	+7.526	9	4
13	70	(Spain) Marc Alcoba	8	+8.576	18	3
14	4	(Spain) Héctor Garzó	8	+9.344	13	2
15	12	(Spain) Xavi Forés	8	+14.494	14	1
16	38	(United Kingdom) Bradley Smith	8	+14.660	16	
17	72	(Italy) Alessio Finello	8	+24.482	17	
Ret	6	(Spain) María Herrera	5	Accident	15	
Fastest lap: (Italy) Matteo Ferrari – 1:42.904 (lap 3)
OFFICIAL MOTOE RACE NR.2 REPORT

- All bikes manufactured by Energica.

== Championship standings after the race ==
Below are the standings for the top five riders, constructors, and teams after the round.

=== MotoGP ===
Riders' Championship standings

	Pos.	Rider	Points
	1	(France) Fabio Quartararo	211
1	2	(Italy) Francesco Bagnaia	181
1	3	(Spain) Aleix Espargaró	178
2	4	(Italy) Enea Bastianini	138
1	5	(France) Johann Zarco	125

Constructors' Championship standings

Pos.	Constructor	Points
1	(Italy) Ducati	321
2	(Japan) Yamaha	211
3	(Italy) Aprilia	201
4	(Austria) KTM	148
5	(Japan) Suzuki	127

Teams' Championship standings

Pos.	Team	Points
1	(Italy) Ducati Lenovo Team	304
2	(Italy) Aprilia Racing	279
3	(Japan) Monster Energy Yamaha MotoGP	237
4	(Italy) Prima Pramac Racing	219
5	(Austria) Red Bull KTM Factory Racing	205

=== Moto2 ===
Riders' Championship standings

	Pos.	Rider	Points
1	1	(Spain) Augusto Fernández	198
1	2	(Japan) Ai Ogura	194
1	3	(Spain) Arón Canet	157
1	4	(Italy) Celestino Vietti	156
1	5	(Italy) Tony Arbolino	117

Constructors' Championship standings

Pos.	Constructor	Points
1	(Germany) Kalex	345
2	(Italy) Boscoscuro	111
3	(Italy) MV Agusta	5

Teams' Championship standings

	Pos.	Team	Points
1	1	(Finland) Red Bull KTM Ajo	296
1	2	(Japan) Idemitsu Honda Team Asia	294
	3	(Spain) Flexbox HP40	232
	4	(Spain) Inde GasGas Aspar Team	173
	5	(Belgium) Elf Marc VDS Racing Team	168

=== Moto3 ===
Riders' Championship standings

	Pos.	Rider	Points
1	1	(Spain) Izan Guevara	204
1	2	(Spain) Sergio García	193
	3	(Italy) Dennis Foggia	169
1	4	(Spain) Jaume Masià	147
1	5	(Turkey) Deniz Öncü	140

Constructors' Championship standings

Pos.	Constructor	Points
1	(Spain) Gas Gas	262
2	(Japan) Honda	251
3	(Austria) KTM	230
4	(Sweden) Husqvarna	174
5	(China) CFMoto	103

Teams' Championship standings

Pos.	Team	Points
1	(Spain) Gaviota GasGas Aspar Team	397
2	(Luxembourg) Leopard Racing	293
3	(Finland) Red Bull KTM Ajo	214
4	(Italy) Sterilgarda Husqvarna Max	185
5	(France) Red Bull KTM Tech3	169

=== MotoE ===
	Pos.	Rider	Points
	1	(Switzerland) Dominique Aegerter	227
	2	(Brazil) Eric Granado	192.5
	3	(Italy) Matteo Ferrari	162.5
1	4	(Italy) Mattia Casadei	156
1	5	(Spain) Miquel Pons	124

Previous race: 2022 Austrian Grand Prix	FIM Grand Prix World Championship; 2022 season	Next race: 2022 Aragon Grand Prix
Previous race: 2021 San Marino Grand Prix	San Marino and Rimini Riviera motorcycle Grand Prix	Next race: 2023 San Marino Grand Prix
