= 2023 Austrian motorcycle Grand Prix =

Motorcycle races in Spielberg

(Austria) 2023 Austrian Grand Prix
Race details
- Race 10 of 20 races in the 2023 Grand Prix motorcycle racing season
- Date: 19–20 August 2023
- Official name: CryptoData Motorrad Grand Prix von Österreich
- Location: Red Bull Ring; Spielberg, Styria, Austria
- Course: Permanent racing facility; 4.348 km (2.702 mi)

MotoGP
Pole position
| Rider | (Italy) Francesco Bagnaia | Ducati |
| Time | 1:28.539 | |
Fastest lap
| Rider | (Italy) Francesco Bagnaia | Ducati |
| Time | 1:29.840 on lap 3 | |
Podium
| First | (Italy) Francesco Bagnaia | Ducati |
| Second | (South Africa) Brad Binder | KTM |
| Third | (Italy) Marco Bezzecchi | Ducati |

Moto2
Pole position
| Rider | (Spain) Pedro Acosta | Kalex |
| Time | 1:34.040 | |
Fastest lap
| Rider | (Spain) Pedro Acosta | Kalex |
| Time | 1:34.453 on lap 3 | |
Podium
| First | (Italy) Celestino Vietti | Kalex |
| Second | (Spain) Pedro Acosta | Kalex |
| Third | (Japan) Ai Ogura | Kalex |

Moto3
Pole position
| Rider | (Netherlands) Collin Veijer | Husqvarna |
| Time | 1:41.486 | |
Fastest lap
| Rider | (Colombia) David Alonso | Gas Gas |
| Time | 1:41.452 on lap 7 | |
Podium
| First | (Turkey) Deniz Öncü | KTM |
| Second | (Spain) Daniel Holgado | KTM |
| Third | (Japan) Ayumu Sasaki | Husqvarna |

MotoE Race 1
Pole position
| Rider | (Italy) Kevin Zannoni | Ducati |
| Time | 1:38.567 | |
Fastest lap
| Rider | (Italy) Mattia Casadei | Ducati |
| Time | 1:38.833 on lap 2 | |
Podium
| First | (Italy) Mattia Casadei | Ducati |
| Second | (Brazil) Eric Granado | Ducati |
| Third | (Italy) Kevin Zannoni | Ducati |

MotoE Race 2
Pole position
| Rider | (Italy) Kevin Zannoni | Ducati |
| Time | 1:38.567 | |
Fastest lap
| Rider | (Italy) Mattia Casadei | Ducati |
| Time | 1:38.742 on lap 3 | |
Podium
| First | (Italy) Mattia Casadei | Ducati |
| Second | (Italy) Matteo Ferrari | Ducati |
| Third | (Italy) Kevin Zannoni | Ducati |

The 2023 Austrian motorcycle Grand Prix (officially known as the CryptoData Motorrad Grand Prix von Österreich) was the tenth round of the 2023 Grand Prix motorcycle racing season and the sixth round of the 2023 MotoE World Championship. All races (except for both MotoE races which were held on 19 August) were held at the Red Bull Ring in Spielberg on 20 August 2023.

== Practice ==
=== MotoGP ===
The top ten riders (written in bold) qualified for Q2.

| Pos. | No. | Biker | Constructor | |
| Pos. | No. | Biker | Constructor | Time results |
|---|---|---|---|---|
| 1 | 72 | **(Italy) Marco Bezzecchi** | **Ducati** | **1:28.533** |
| 2 | 12 | **(Spain) Maverick Viñales** | **Aprilia** | **1:28.577** |
| 3 | 63 | **(Italy) Francesco Bagnaia** | **Ducati** | **1:28.821** |
| 4 | 33 | **(South Africa) Brad Binder** | **KTM** | **1:28.863** |
| 5 | 5 | **(France) Johann Zarco** | **Ducati** | **1:28.921** |
| 6 | 89 | **(Spain) Jorge Martín** | **Ducati** | **1:29.012** |
| 7 | 41 | **(Spain) Aleix Espargaró** | **Aprilia** | **1:29.052** |
| 8 | 73 | **(Spain) Álex Márquez** | **Ducati** | **1:29.096** |
| 9 | 10 | **(France) Fabio Quartararo** | **Yamaha** | **1:29.155** |
| 10 | 88 | **(Portugal) Miguel Oliveira** | **Aprilia** | **1:29.160** |
| 11 | 10 | (Italy) Luca Marini | Ducati | 1:29.186 |
| 12 | 49 | (Italy) Fabio Di Giannantonio | Ducati | 1:29.310 |
| 13 | 93 | (Spain) Marc Márquez | Honda | 1:29.356 |
| 14 | 43 | (Australia) Jack Miller | KTM | 1:29.400 |
| 15 | 44 | (Spain) Pol Espargaró | KTM | 1:29.486 |
| 16 | 23 | (Italy) Enea Bastianini | Ducati | 1:29.515 |
| 17 | 21 | (Italy) Franco Morbidelli | Yamaha | 1:29.621 |
| 18 | 30 | (Japan) Takaaki Nakagami | Honda | 1:29.730 |
| 19 | 25 | (Spain) Raúl Fernández | Aprilia | 1:29.789 |
| 20 | 37 | (Spain) Augusto Fernández | KTM | 1:29.867 |
| 21 | 32 | (Italy) Lorenzo Savadori | Aprilia | 1:30.003 |
| 22 | 27 | (Spain) Iker Lecuona | Honda | 1:30.223 |
| 23 | 36 | (Spain) Joan Mir | Honda | 1:30.352 |
OFFICIAL MOTOGP PRACTICE TIMES REPORT

== Qualifying ==
=== MotoGP ===
Fastest session lap

| Pos. | No. | Biker | Constructor | Qualifying times | | Final grid | Row |
| Pos. | No. | Biker | Constructor | Q1 | Q2 | Final grid | Row |
|---|---|---|---|---|---|---|---|
| 1 | 1 | (Italy) Francesco Bagnaia | Ducati | Qualified in Q2 | 1:28.539 | 1 | 1 |
| 2 | 12 | (Spain) Maverick Viñales | Aprilia | Qualified in Q2 | 1:28.576 | 2 | 1 |
| 3 | 33 | (South Africa) Brad Binder | KTM | Qualified in Q2 | 1:28.653 | 3 | 1 |
| 4 | 43 | (Australia) Jack Miller | KTM | 1:28.831 | 1:28.769 | 4 | 2 |
| 5 | 73 | (Spain) Álex Márquez | Ducati | Qualified in Q2 | 1:28.828 | 5 | 2 |
| 6 | 10 | (Italy) Luca Marini | Ducati | 1:29.120 | 1:28.839 | 6 | 2 |
| 7 | 72 | (Italy) Marco Bezzecchi | Ducati | Qualified in Q2 | 1:28.908 | 7 | 3 |
| 8 | 88 | (Portugal) Miguel Oliveira | Aprilia | Qualified in Q2 | 1:28.966 | 8 | 3 |
| 9 | 20 | (France) Fabio Quartararo | Yamaha | Qualified in Q2 | 1:29.034 | 9 | 3 |
| 10 | 5 | (France) Johann Zarco | Ducati | Qualified in Q2 | 1:29.113 | 10 | 4 |
| 11 | 41 | (Spain) Aleix Espargaró | Aprilia | Qualified in Q2 | 1:29.245 | 11 | 4 |
| 12 | 89 | (Spain) Jorge Martín | Ducati | Qualified in Q2 | 1:30.367 | 12 | 4 |
| 13 | 44 | (Spain) Pol Espargaró | KTM | 1:29.295 | N/A | 16 (Note: Three-place grid penalty for blocking Marc Márquez during FP2.) | 6 |
| 14 | 23 | (Italy) Enea Bastianini | Ducati | 1:29.365 | N/A | 13 | 5 |
| 15 | 21 | (Italy) Franco Morbidelli | Yamaha | 1:29.446 | N/A | 14 | 5 |
| 16 | 36 | (Spain) Joan Mir | Honda | 1:29.454 | N/A | 15 | 5 |
| 17 | 25 | (Spain) Raúl Fernández | Aprilia | 1:29.476 | N/A | 17 | 6 |
| 18 | 93 | (Spain) Marc Márquez | Honda | 1:29.479 | N/A | 18 | 6 |
| 19 | 30 | (Japan) Takaaki Nakagami | Honda | 1:29.508 | N/A | 19 | 7 |
| 20 | 49 | (Italy) Fabio Di Giannantonio | Ducati | 1:29.681 | N/A | 20 | 7 |
| 21 | 27 | (Spain) Iker Lecuona | Honda | 1:29.751 | N/A | 21 | 7 |
| 22 | 37 | (Spain) Augusto Fernández | KTM | 1:29.769 | N/A | 22 | 8 |
| 23 | 32 | (Italy) Lorenzo Savadori | Aprilia | 1:29.962 | N/A | 23 | 8 |
OFFICIAL MOTOGP QUALIFYING RESULTS

=== Moto3 ===
Fastest session lap

| Pos. | No. | Biker | Constructor | Qualifying times | | Final grid | Row |
| Pos. | No. | Biker | Constructor | Q1 | Q2 | Final grid | Row |
|---|---|---|---|---|---|---|---|
| 1 | 95 | (Netherlands) Collin Veijer | Husqvarna | Qualified in Q2 | 1:41.486 | 1 | 1 |
| 2 | 96 | (Spain) Daniel Holgado | KTM | Qualified in Q2 | 1:41.543 | 2 | 1 |
| 3 | 53 | (Turkey) Deniz Öncü | KTM | Qualified in Q2 | 1:41.591 | 3 | 1 |
| 4 | 5 | (Spain) Jaume Masià | Honda | Qualified in Q2 | 1:41.690 | 4 | 2 |
| 5 | 99 | (Spain) José Antonio Rueda | KTM | Qualified in Q2 | 1:41.795 | 5 | 2 |
| 6 | 54 | (Italy) Riccardo Rossi | Honda | Qualified in Q2 | 1:41.908 | 6 | 2 |
| 7 | 80 | (Colombia) David Alonso | Gas Gas | Qualified in Q2 | 1:41.949 | 7 | 3 |
| 8 | 71 | (Japan) Ayumu Sasaki | Husqvarna | Qualified in Q2 | 1:41.961 | 8 | 3 |
| 9 | 66 | (Australia) Joel Kelso | CFMoto | Qualified in Q2 | 1:41.972 | 9 | 3 |
| 10 | 44 | (Spain) David Muñoz | Honda | Qualified in Q2 | 1:42.093 | 10 | 4 |
| 11 | 82 | (Italy) Stefano Nepa | KTM | Qualified in Q2 | 1:42.322 | 11 | 4 |
| 12 | 24 | (Japan) Tatsuki Suzuki | Honda | Qualified in Q2 | 1:42.339 | 12 | 4 |
| 13 | 6 | (Japan) Ryusei Yamanaka | Honda | 1:41.690 | 1:42.459 | 13 | 5 |
| 14 | 55 | (Italy) Romano Fenati | Honda | Qualified in Q2 | 1:42.639 | 14 | 5 |
| 15 | 19 | (United Kingdom) Scott Ogden | Honda | Qualified in Q2 | 1:43.196 | 15 | 5 |
| 16 | 18 | (Italy) Matteo Bertelle | Honda | 1:42.078 | 1:43.273 | 16 | 6 |
| 17 | 48 | (Spain) Iván Ortolá | KTM | 1:42.319 | NC | 17 | 6 |
| 18 | 72 | (Japan) Taiyo Furusato | Honda | 1:42.307 | NC | 18 | 6 |
| 19 | 10 | (Brazil) Diogo Moreira | KTM | 1:42.429 | N/A | 19 | 7 |
| 20 | 63 | (Malaysia) Syarifuddin Azman | KTM | 1:42.549 | N/A | 20 | 7 |
| 21 | 27 | (Japan) Kaito Toba | Honda | 1:42.592 | N/A | 21 | 7 |
| 22 | 43 | (Spain) Xavier Artigas | CFMoto | 1:42.777 | N/A | 22 | 8 |
| 23 | 12 | (Switzerland) Noah Dettwiler | CFMoto | 1:42.882 | N/A | 23 | 8 |
| 24 | 7 | (Italy) Filippo Farioli | KTM | 1:43.004 | N/A | 24 | 8 |
| 25 | 38 | (Spain) David Salvador | KTM | 1:43.017 | N/A | 25 | 9 |
| 26 | 22 | (Spain) Ana Carrasco | KTM | 1:43.111 | N/A | 26 | 9 |
| 27 | 64 | (Indonesia) Mario Aji | Honda | 1:43.264 | N/A | 27 | 9 |
| 28 | 70 | (United Kingdom) Joshua Whatley | Honda | 1:43.343 | N/A | 28 | 10 |
| 29 | 33 | (Thailand) Tatchakorn Buasri | Honda | 1:43.434 | N/A | 29 | 10 |
| 30 | 20 | (France) Lorenzo Fellon | KTM | 1:43.445 | N/A | 30 | 10 |
OFFICIAL MOTO3 QUALIFYING RESULTS

=== MotoE ===
Fastest session lap

| Pos. | No. | Biker | Qualifying times | | Final grid | Row |
| Pos. | No. | Biker | Q1 | Q2 | Final grid | Row |
|---|---|---|---|---|---|---|
| 1 | 21 | (Italy) Kevin Zannoni | Qualified in Q2 | 1:38.567 | 1 | 1 |
| 2 | 40 | (Italy) Mattia Casadei | Qualified in Q2 | 1:38.590 | 2 | 1 |
| 3 | 51 | (Brazil) Eric Granado | Qualified in Q2 | 1:38.620 | 3 | 1 |
| 4 | 11 | (Italy) Matteo Ferrari | Qualified in Q2 | 1:39.146 | 4 | 2 |
| 5 | 78 | (Japan) Hikari Okubo | Qualified in Q2 | 1:39.158 | 5 | 2 |
| 6 | 4 | (Spain) Héctor Garzó | Qualified in Q2 | 1:39.360 | 6 | 2 |
| 7 | 77 | (Spain) Miquel Pons | Qualified in Q2 | 1:39.580 | 7 | 3 |
| 8 | 81 | (Spain) Jordi Torres | 1:41.520 | 1:39.792 | 8 | 3 |
| 9 | 34 | (Italy) Kevin Manfredi | Qualified in Q2 | 1:39.876 | 9 | 3 |
| 10 | 3 | (Switzerland) Randy Krummenacher | 1:41.908 | 1:39.970 | 10 | 4 |
| 11 | 9 | (Italy) Andrea Mantovani | 1:42.085 | N/A | 11 | 4 |
| 12 | 53 | (Spain) Tito Rabat | 1:42.275 | N/A | 12 | 4 |
| 13 | 99 | (Italy) Oscar Gutiérrez | 1:42.355 | N/A | 13 | 5 |
| 14 | 29 | (Italy) Nicholas Spinelli | 1:42.561 | N/A | 14 | 5 |
| 15 | 8 | (Spain) Mika Pérez | 1:43.651 | N/A | 15 | 5 |
| 16 | 72 | (Italy) Alessio Finello | 1:44.959 | N/A | 16 | 6 |
| 17 | 61 | (Italy) Alessandro Zaccone | 1:45.097 | N/A | 17 | 6 |
| 18 | 6 | (Spain) María Herrera | 1:52.118 | N/A | 18 | 6 |
OFFICIAL MOTOE QUALIFYING RESULTS

- All bikes manufactured by Ducati.

== MotoGP Sprint ==
The MotoGP Sprint was held on 19 August.

| Pos. | No. | Rider | Team | Constructor | Laps | Time/Retired | Grid | Points |
|---|---|---|---|---|---|---|---|---|
| 1 | 1 | (Italy) Francesco Bagnaia | Ducati Lenovo Team | Ducati | 14 | 21:01.844 | 1 | 12 |
| 2 | 33 | (South Africa) Brad Binder | Red Bull KTM Factory Racing | KTM | 14 | +2.056 | 3 | 9 |
| 3 | 89 | (Spain) Jorge Martín | Prima Pramac Racing | Ducati | 14 | +5.045 | 12 | 7 |
| 4 | 73 | (Spain) Álex Márquez | Gresini Racing MotoGP | Ducati | 14 | +8.252 | 5 | 6 |
| 5 | 43 | (Australia) Jack Miller | Red Bull KTM Factory Racing | KTM | 14 | +11.365 | 4 | 5 |
| 6 | 44 | (Spain) Pol Espargaró | GasGas Factory Racing Tech3 | KTM | 14 | +11.816 | 13 | 4 |
| 7 | 41 | (Spain) Aleix Espargaró | Aprilia Racing | Aprilia | 14 | +11.960 | 11 | 3 |
| 8 | 12 | (Spain) Maverick Viñales | Aprilia Racing | Aprilia | 14 | +11.984 | 2 | 2 |
| 9 | 21 | (Italy) Franco Morbidelli | Monster Energy Yamaha MotoGP | Yamaha | 14 | +13.634 | 15 | 1 |
| 10 | 93 | (Spain) Marc Márquez | Repsol Honda Team | Honda | 14 | +14.435 | 18 | |
| 11 | 49 | (Italy) Fabio Di Giannantonio | Gresini Racing MotoGP | Ducati | 14 | +15.251 | 20 | |
| 12 | 36 | (Spain) Joan Mir | Repsol Honda Team | Honda | 14 | +16.740 | 16 | |
| 13 | 23 | (Italy) Enea Bastianini | Ducati Lenovo Team | Ducati | 14 | +18.825 | 14 | |
| 14 | 25 | (Spain) Raúl Fernández | CryptoData RNF MotoGP Team | Aprilia | 14 | +19.536 | 17 | |
| 15 | 20 | (France) Fabio Quartararo | Monster Energy Yamaha MotoGP | Yamaha | 14 | +22.321 | 9 | |
| 16 | 27 | (Spain) Iker Lecuona | LCR Honda Castrol | Honda | 14 | +25.593 | 21 | |
| 17 | 37 | (Spain) Augusto Fernández | GasGas Factory Racing Tech3 | KTM | 14 | +25.789 | 22 | |
| Ret | 5 | (France) Johann Zarco | Prima Pramac Racing | Ducati | 11 | Collision damage | 10 | |
| Ret | 10 | (Italy) Luca Marini | Mooney VR46 Racing Team | Ducati | 6 | Collision | 6 | |
| Ret | 32 | (Italy) Lorenzo Savadori | Aprilia Racing | Aprilia | 5 | Collision | 23 | |
| Ret | 30 | (Japan) Takaaki Nakagami | LCR Honda Idemitsu | Honda | 2 | Accident | 19 | |
| Ret | 72 | (Italy) Marco Bezzecchi | Mooney VR46 Racing Team | Ducati | 1 | Collision damage | 7 | |
| Ret | 88 | (Portugal) Miguel Oliveira | CryptoData RNF MotoGP Team | Aprilia | 0 | Collision | 8 | |
Fastest sprint lap: (Italy) Francesco Bagnaia (Ducati) – 1:29.383 (lap 4)
OFFICIAL MOTOGP SPRINT REPORT

== Warm up practice ==
=== MotoGP ===
Enea Bastianini set the best time 1:29.517 and was the fastest rider at this session ahead of Fabio Quartararo and Álex Márquez.

== Race ==
=== MotoGP ===
| Pos. | No. | Rider | Team | Constructor | Laps | Time/Retired | Grid | Points |
|---|---|---|---|---|---|---|---|---|
| 1 | 1 | (Italy) Francesco Bagnaia | Ducati Lenovo Team | Ducati | 28 | 42:23.315 | 1 | 25 |
| 2 | 33 | (South Africa) Brad Binder | Red Bull KTM Factory Racing | KTM | 28 | +5.191 | 3 | 20 |
| 3 | 72 | (Italy) Marco Bezzecchi | Mooney VR46 Racing Team | Ducati | 28 | +7.708 | 7 | 16 |
| 4 | 10 | (Italy) Luca Marini | Mooney VR46 Racing Team | Ducati | 28 | +10.343 | 6 | 13 |
| 5 | 73 | (Spain) Álex Márquez | Gresini Racing MotoGP | Ducati | 28 | +11.039 | 5 | 11 |
| 6 | 12 | (Spain) Maverick Viñales | Aprilia Racing | Aprilia | 28 | +11.724 | 2 | 10 |
| 7 | 89 | (Spain) Jorge Martín | Prima Pramac Racing | Ducati | 28 | +12.917 | 12 | 9 |
| 8 | 20 | (France) Fabio Quartararo | Monster Energy Yamaha MotoGP | Yamaha | 28 | +19.509 | 9 | 8 |
| 9 | 41 | (Spain) Aleix Espargaró | Aprilia Racing | Aprilia | 28 | +20.231 | 11 | 7 |
| 10 | 23 | (Italy) Enea Bastianini | Ducati Lenovo Team | Ducati | 28 | +20.729 | 13 | 6 |
| 11 | 21 | (Italy) Franco Morbidelli | Monster Energy Yamaha MotoGP | Yamaha | 28 | +21.527 | 14 | 5 |
| 12 | 93 | (Spain) Marc Márquez | Repsol Honda Team | Honda | 28 | +23.027 | 18 | 4 |
| 13 | 5 | (France) Johann Zarco | Prima Pramac Racing | Ducati | 28 | +24.259 | 10 | 3 |
| 14 | 37 | (Spain) Augusto Fernández | GasGas Factory Racing Tech3 | KTM | 28 | +25.365 | 22 | 2 |
| 15 | 43 | (Australia) Jack Miller | Red Bull KTM Factory Racing | KTM | 28 | +25.475 | 4 | 1 |
| 16 | 44 | (Spain) Pol Espargaró | GasGas Factory Racing Tech3 | KTM | 28 | +28.073 (Note: Three-second penalty for exceeding track limits.) | 16 | |
| 17 | 49 | (Italy) Fabio Di Giannantonio | Gresini Racing MotoGP | Ducati | 28 | +28.998 | 20 | |
| 18 | 30 | (Japan) Takaaki Nakagami | LCR Honda Idemitsu | Honda | 28 | +32.316 | 19 | |
| 19 | 32 | (Italy) Lorenzo Savadori | Aprilia Racing | Aprilia | 28 | +42.392 | 23 | |
| 20 | 27 | (Spain) Iker Lecuona | LCR Honda Castrol | Honda | 28 | +46.239 | 21 | |
| Ret | 25 | (Spain) Raúl Fernández | CryptoData RNF MotoGP Team | Aprilia | 27 | Retired | 17 | |
| Ret | 36 | (Spain) Joan Mir | Repsol Honda Team | Honda | 12 | Accident | 15 | |
| Ret | 88 | (Portugal) Miguel Oliveira | CryptoData RNF MotoGP Team | Aprilia | 6 | Retired | 8 | |
Fastest lap: (Italy) Francesco Bagnaia (Ducati) – 1:29.840 (lap 3)
OFFICIAL MOTOGP RACE REPORT

=== Moto2 ===
| Pos. | No. | Rider | Constructor | Laps | Time/Retired | Grid | Points |
|---|---|---|---|---|---|---|---|
| 1 | 13 | (Italy) Celestino Vietti | Kalex | 23 | 36:25.093 | 3 | 25 |
| 2 | 37 | (Spain) Pedro Acosta | Kalex | 23 | +1.435 | 1 | 20 |
| 3 | 79 | (Japan) Ai Ogura | Kalex | 23 | +5.189 | 2 | 16 |
| 4 | 96 | (United Kingdom) Jake Dixon | Kalex | 23 | +6.145 | 4 | 13 |
| 5 | 35 | (Thailand) Somkiat Chantra | Kalex | 23 | +8.635 | 5 | 11 |
| 6 | 14 | (Italy) Tony Arbolino | Kalex | 23 | +14.054 | 7 | 10 |
| 7 | 12 | (Czech Republic) Filip Salač | Kalex | 23 | +14.492 | 12 | 9 |
| 8 | 11 | (Spain) Sergio García | Kalex | 23 | +16.445 | 16 | 8 |
| 9 | 54 | (Spain) Fermín Aldeguer | Boscoscuro | 23 | +17.178 | 6 | 7 |
| 10 | 3 | (Germany) Lukas Tulovic | Kalex | 23 | +35.361 | 18 | 6 |
| 11 | 71 | (Italy) Dennis Foggia | Kalex | 23 | +37.855 | 17 | 5 |
| 12 | 52 | (Spain) Jeremy Alcoba | Kalex | 23 | +39.551 | 25 | 4 |
| 13 | 28 | (Spain) Izan Guevara | Kalex | 23 | +40.213 | 19 | 3 |
| 14 | 24 | (Spain) Marcos Ramírez | Kalex | 23 | +40.410 | 23 | 2 |
| 15 | 64 | (Netherlands) Bo Bendsneyder | Kalex | 23 | +41.098 | 20 | 1 |
| 16 | 72 | (Spain) Borja Gómez | Kalex | 23 | +43.446 | 22 | |
| 17 | 67 | (Italy) Alberto Surra | Forward | 23 | +45.018 | 26 | |
| 18 | 33 | (United Kingdom) Rory Skinner | Kalex | 23 | +47.622 | 24 | |
| 19 | 73 | (Italy) Mattia Rato | Kalex | 23 | +49.861 | 28 | |
| 20 | 5 | (Japan) Kohta Nozane | Kalex | 23 | +57.039 | 27 | |
| 21 | 21 | (Spain) Alonso López | Boscoscuro | 23 | +1:09.264 | 11 | |
| 22 | 84 | (Netherlands) Zonta van den Goorbergh | Kalex | 23 | +1:10.514 | 13 | |
| Ret | 16 | (United States) Joe Roberts | Kalex | 11 | Retired | 21 | |
| Ret | 40 | (Spain) Arón Canet | Kalex | 10 | Accident | 10 | |
| Ret | 75 | (Spain) Albert Arenas | Kalex | 9 | Accident | 8 | |
| Ret | 18 | (Spain) Manuel González | Kalex | 7 | Accident | 9 | |
| Ret | 15 | (South Africa) Darryn Binder | Kalex | 2 | Accident | 15 | |
| Ret | 22 | (United Kingdom) Sam Lowes | Kalex | 2 | Accident | 14 | |
| DNS | 17 | (Spain) Álex Escrig | Forward | | Did not start | | |
| DNS | 7 | (Belgium) Barry Baltus | Kalex | | Did not start | | |
Fastest lap: (Spain) Pedro Acosta (Kalex) – 1:34.453 (lap 3)
OFFICIAL MOTO2 RACE REPORT

- Álex Escrig suffered a fractured tibia due to a crash in Practice 3 and withdrew from the race.
- Barry Baltus withdrew from the race after he was deemed unfit after Practice 2 due to hurting his foot prior to the race weekend.

=== Moto3 ===
| Pos. | No. | Rider | Constructor | Laps | Time/Retired | Grid | Points |
|---|---|---|---|---|---|---|---|
| 1 | 53 | (Turkey) Deniz Öncü | KTM | 20 | 34:04.291 | 3 | 25 |
| 2 | 96 | (Spain) Daniel Holgado | KTM | 20 | +0.005 | 2 | 20 |
| 3 | 71 | (Japan) Ayumu Sasaki | Husqvarna | 20 | +0.119 | 8 | 16 |
| 4 | 95 | (Netherlands) Collin Veijer | Husqvarna | 20 | +0.136 | 1 | 13 |
| 5 | 48 | (Spain) Iván Ortolá | KTM | 20 | +3.135 | 18 | 11 |
| 6 | 54 | (Italy) Riccardo Rossi | Honda | 20 | +5.270 | 6 | 10 |
| 7 | 6 | (Japan) Ryusei Yamanaka | Gas Gas | 20 | +8.137 | 13 | 9 |
| 8 | 10 | (Brazil) Diogo Moreira | KTM | 20 | +8.382 | 19 | 8 |
| 9 | 44 | (Spain) David Muñoz | KTM | 20 | +8.453 | 10 | 7 |
| 10 | 82 | (Italy) Stefano Nepa | KTM | 20 | +8.615 | 11 | 6 |
| 11 | 99 | (Spain) José Antonio Rueda | KTM | 20 | +8.667 | 5 | 5 |
| 12 | 18 | (Italy) Matteo Bertelle | Honda | 20 | +9.239 | 16 | 4 |
| 13 | 24 | (Japan) Tatsuki Suzuki | Honda | 20 | +9.516 | 12 | 3 |
| 14 | 27 | (Japan) Kaito Toba | Honda | 20 | +14.741 | 21 | 2 |
| 15 | 38 | (Spain) David Salvador | KTM | 20 | +19.343 | 25 | 1 |
| 16 | 66 | (Australia) Joel Kelso | CFMoto | 20 | +19.415 | 9 | |
| 17 | 55 | (Italy) Romano Fenati | Honda | 20 | +19.526 | 14 | |
| 18 | 72 | (Japan) Taiyo Furusato | Honda | 20 | +20.346 | 17 | |
| 19 | 43 | (Spain) Xavier Artigas | CFMoto | 20 | +21.524 | 22 | |
| 20 | 12 | (Switzerland) Noah Dettwiler | CFMoto | 20 | +21.758 | 23 | |
| 21 | 7 | (Italy) Filippo Farioli | KTM | 20 | +21.850 | 24 | |
| 22 | 19 | (United Kingdom) Scott Ogden | Honda | 20 | +22.293 | 15 | |
| 23 | 33 | (Thailand) Tatchakorn Buasri | Honda | 20 | +29.684 | 29 | |
| 24 | 20 | (France) Lorenzo Fellon | KTM | 20 | +31.814 | 30 | |
| 25 | 22 | (Spain) Ana Carrasco | KTM | 20 | +31.858 | 26 | |
| 26 | 64 | (Indonesia) Mario Aji | Honda | 20 | +32.013 | 27 | |
| 27 | 70 | (United Kingdom) Joshua Whatley | Honda | 20 | +36.954 | 28 | |
| 28 | 63 | (Malaysia) Syarifuddin Azman | KTM | 20 | +45.512 | 20 | |
| 29 | 80 | (Colombia) David Alonso | Gas Gas | 19 | +1 lap | 7 | |
| Ret | 5 | (Spain) Jaume Masià | Honda | 3 | Technical issue | 4 | |
Fastest lap: (Colombia) David Alonso (Gas Gas) – 1:41.452 (lap 7)
OFFICIAL MOTO3 RACE REPORT

=== MotoE ===
==== Race 1 ====
| Pos. | No. | Rider | Laps | Time/Retired | Grid | Points |
|---|---|---|---|---|---|---|
| 1 | 40 | (Italy) Mattia Casadei | 7 | 11:37.993 | 2 | 25 |
| 2 | 51 | (Brazil) Eric Granado | 7 | +1.218 | 3 | 20 |
| 3 | 21 | (Italy) Kevin Zannoni | 7 | +1.382 | 1 | 16 |
| 4 | 4 | (Spain) Héctor Garzó | 7 | +1.466 | 6 | 13 |
| 5 | 81 | (Spain) Jordi Torres | 7 | +4.114 | 8 | 11 |
| 6 | 77 | (Spain) Miquel Pons | 7 | +5.950 | 7 | 10 |
| 7 | 61 | (Italy) Alessandro Zaccone | 7 | +8.394 | 17 | 9 |
| 8 | 8 | (Spain) Mika Pérez | 7 | +9.199 | 15 | 8 |
| 9 | 34 | (Italy) Kevin Manfredi | 7 | +9.498 | 9 | 7 |
| 10 | 53 | (Spain) Tito Rabat | 7 | +9.637 | 12 | 6 |
| 11 | 3 | (Switzerland) Randy Krummenacher | 7 | +9.806 | 10 | 5 |
| 12 | 99 | (Spain) Oscar Gutiérrez | 7 | +9.980 | 13 | 4 |
| 13 | 29 | (Italy) Nicholas Spinelli | 7 | +10.585 | 14 | 3 |
| 14 | 72 | (Italy) Alessio Finello | 7 | +11.719 | 16 | 2 |
| 15 | 6 | (Spain) María Herrera | 7 | +17.012 | 18 | 1 |
| 16 | 11 | (Italy) Matteo Ferrari | 7 | +1:30.121 | 4 | |
| Ret | 78 | (Japan) Hikari Okubo | 5 | Retired | 5 | |
| Ret | 9 | (Italy) Andrea Mantovani | 0 | Accident | 11 | |
Fastest lap: (Italy) Mattia Casadei – 1:38.833 (lap 2)
OFFICIAL MOTOE RACE NR.1 REPORT

- All bikes manufactured by Ducati.

==== Race 2 ====
| Pos. | No. | Rider | Laps | Time/Retired | Grid | Points |
|---|---|---|---|---|---|---|
| 1 | 40 | (Italy) Mattia Casadei | 7 | 11:37.686 | 2 | 25 |
| 2 | 11 | (Italy) Matteo Ferrari | 7 | +0.077 | 4 | 20 |
| 3 | 21 | (Italy) Kevin Zannoni | 7 | +0.373 | 1 | 16 |
| 4 | 77 | (Spain) Miquel Pons | 7 | +2.158 | 7 | 13 |
| 5 | 4 | (Spain) Héctor Garzó | 7 | +2.246 | 6 | 11 |
| 6 | 81 | (Spain) Jordi Torres | 7 | +3.929 | 8 | 10 |
| 7 | 3 | (Switzerland) Randy Krummenacher | 7 | +5.638 | 10 | 9 |
| 8 | 78 | (Japan) Hikari Okubo | 7 | +6.337 | 5 | 8 |
| 9 | 9 | (Italy) Andrea Mantovani | 7 | +8.352 | 11 | 7 |
| 10 | 34 | (Italy) Kevin Manfredi | 7 | +8.868 | 9 | 6 |
| 11 | 61 | (Italy) Alessandro Zaccone | 7 | +9.018 | 17 | 5 |
| 12 | 99 | (Spain) Oscar Gutiérrez | 7 | +9.101 | 13 | 4 |
| 13 | 29 | (Italy) Nicholas Spinelli | 7 | +9.436 | 14 | 3 |
| 14 | 53 | (Spain) Tito Rabat | 7 | +9.837 | 12 | 2 |
| 15 | 8 | (Spain) Mika Pérez | 7 | +10.527 | 15 | 1 |
| 16 | 72 | (Italy) Alessio Finello | 7 | +10.869 | 16 | |
| 17 | 6 | (Spain) María Herrera | 7 | +19.039 | 18 | |
| 18 | 51 | (Brazil) Eric Granado | 7 | +43.639 | 3 | |
Fastest lap: (Italy) Mattia Casadei – 1:38.742 (lap 3)
OFFICIAL MOTOE RACE NR.2 REPORT

- All bikes manufactured by Ducati.

== Championship standings after the race ==
Below are the standings for the top five riders, constructors, and teams after the round.

=== MotoGP ===
Riders' Championship standings

| Pos. | Rider | Points |
|---|---|---|
| 1 | (Italy) Francesco Bagnaia | 251 |
| 2 | (Spain) Jorge Martín | 189 |
| 3 | (Italy) Marco Bezzecchi | 183 |
| 4 | (South Africa) Brad Binder | 160 |
| 5 | (France) Johann Zarco | 125 |

Constructors' Championship standings

| Pos. | Constructor | Points |
|---|---|---|
| 1 | (Italy) Ducati | 354 |
| 2 | (Austria) KTM | 201 |
| 3 | (Italy) Aprilia | 166 |
| 4 | (Japan) Honda | 93 |
| 5 | (Japan) Yamaha | 93 |

Teams' Championship standings

| Pos. | Team | Points |
|---|---|---|
| 1 | (Italy) Prima Pramac Racing | 314 |
| 2 | (Italy) Mooney VR46 Racing Team | 303 |
| 3 | (Italy) Ducati Lenovo Team | 285 |
| 4 | (Austria) Red Bull KTM Factory Racing | 256 |
| 5 | (Italy) Aprilia Racing | 203 |

=== Moto2 ===
Riders' Championship standings

| Pos. | Rider | Points |
|---|---|---|
| 1 | (Spain) Pedro Acosta | 176 |
| 2 | (Italy) Tony Arbolino | 164 |
| 3 | (United Kingdom) Jake Dixon | 117 |
| 4 | (Spain) Arón Canet | 96 |
| 5 | (Spain) Alonso López | 92 |

Constructors' Championship standings

| Pos. | Constructor | Points |
|---|---|---|
| 1 | (Germany) Kalex | 245 |
| 2 | (Italy) Boscoscuro | 131 |

Teams' Championship standings

| Pos. | Team | Points |
|---|---|---|
| 1 | (Belgium) Elf Marc VDS Racing Team | 231 |
| 2 | (Finland) Red Bull KTM Ajo | 219 |
| 3 | (Italy) CAG Speed Up | 173 |
| 4 | (Spain) Pons Wegow Los40 | 141 |
| 5 | (Japan) Idemitsu Honda Team Asia | 132 |

=== Moto3 ===
Riders' Championship standings

| | Pos. | Rider | Points |
|---|---|---|---|
| | 1 | (Spain) Daniel Holgado | 161 |
| | 2 | (Japan) Ayumu Sasaki | 135 |
| 2 | 3 | (Turkey) Deniz Öncü | 124 |
| | 4 | (Spain) Iván Ortolá | 118 |
| 2 | 5 | (Spain) Jaume Masià | 109 |

Constructors' Championship standings

| Pos. | Constructor | Points |
|---|---|---|
| 1 | (Austria) KTM | 227 |
| 2 | (Japan) Honda | 150 |
| 3 | (Sweden) Husqvarna | 138 |
| 4 | (Spain) Gas Gas | 107 |
| 5 | (China) CFMoto | 62 |

Teams' Championship standings

| | Pos. | Team | Points |
|---|---|---|---|
| | 1 | (Finland) Red Bull KTM Ajo | 189 |
| 1 | 2 | (Germany) Liqui Moly Husqvarna Intact GP | 182 |
| 1 | 3 | (Italy) Angeluss MTA Team | 174 |
| 1 | 4 | (France) Red Bull KTM Tech3 | 163 |
| 1 | 5 | (Luxembourg) Leopard Racing | 150 |

=== MotoE ===
Riders' Championship standings

| | Pos. | Rider | Points |
|---|---|---|---|
| | 1 | (Spain) Jordi Torres | 189 |
| 1 | 2 | (Italy) Mattia Casadei | 174 |
| 1 | 3 | (Italy) Matteo Ferrari | 173 |
| 1 | 4 | (Spain) Héctor Garzó | 146 |
| 1 | 5 | (Switzerland) Randy Krummenacher | 137 |

Teams' Championship standings

| Pos. | Team | Points |
|---|---|---|
| 1 | (Germany) Dynavolt Intact GP MotoE | 283 |
| 2 | (Spain) HP Pons Los40 | 256 |
| 3 | (Spain) Openbank Aspar Team | 203 |
| 4 | (Italy) Felo Gresini MotoE | 201 |
| 5 | (Monaco) LCR E-Team | 199 |

== Notes ==
| Previous race: 2023 British Grand Prix | FIM Grand Prix World Championship; 2023 season | Next race: 2023 Catalan Grand Prix |
| Previous race: 2022 Austrian Grand Prix | Austrian motorcycle Grand Prix | Next race: 2024 Austrian Grand Prix |
