= Jordi Torres =

Spanish motorcycle racer

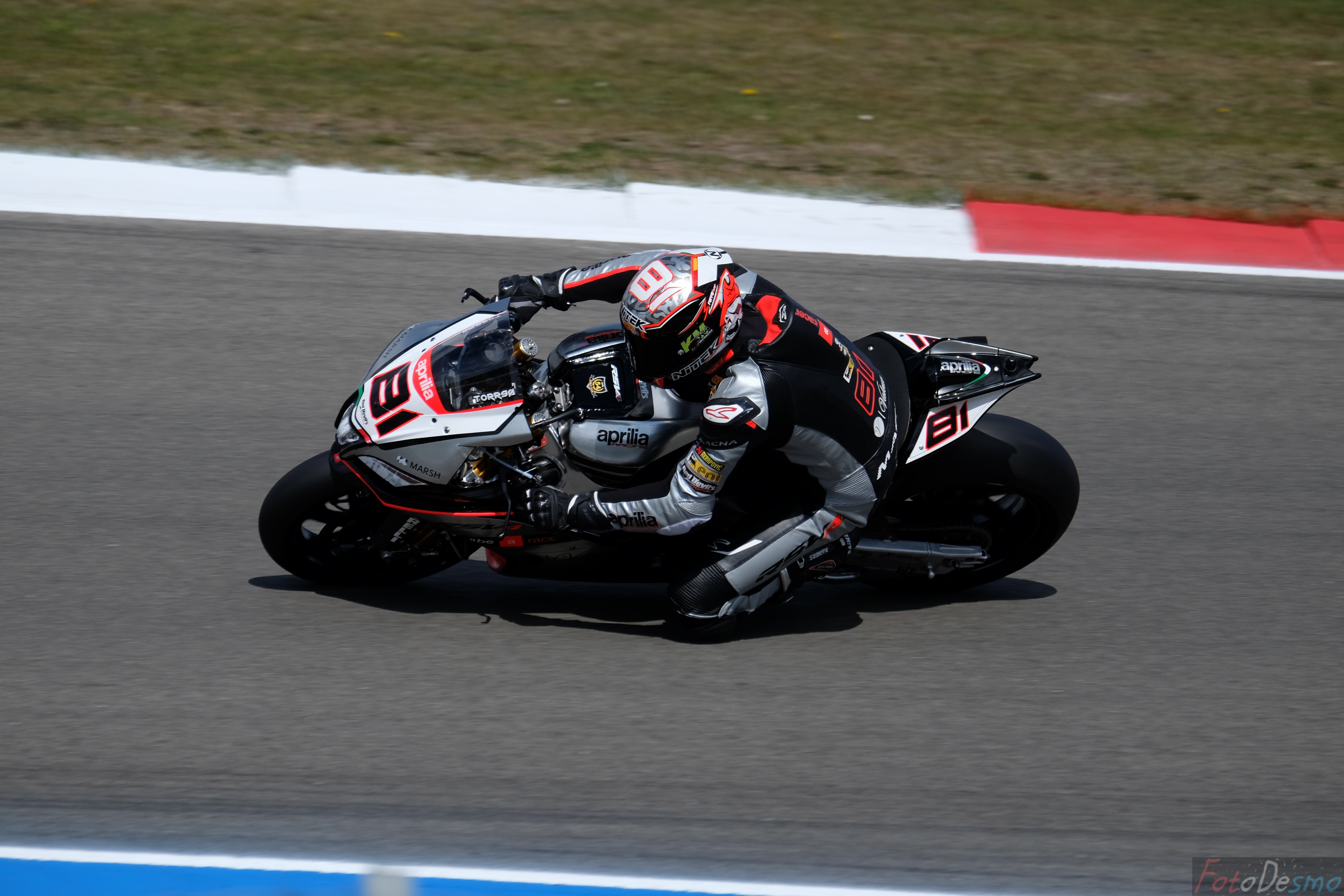
- Torres in 2015
- Nationality: Spanish
- Born: 27 August 1987 (age 39); Rubí, Spain
- Current team: Power Electronics Aspar Team
- Bike number: 81
Motorcycle racing career statistics
MotoGP World Championship
Active years	2018
Manufacturers	Ducati
Championships	0
2018 championship position	28th (1 pt)
Starts / Wins / Podiums / Poles / F. laps / Points; 5 / 0 / 0 / 0 / 0 / 1
Moto2 World Championship
Active years	2010–2014, 2023
Manufacturers	Promoharris, Suter, Tech 3, Kalex
Championships	0
2014 championship position	16th (57 pts)
Starts / Wins / Podiums / Poles / F. laps / Points; 57 / 1 / 3 / 0 / 1 / 216
MotoE World Championship
Active years	2020–
Manufacturers	Energica, Ducati
Championships	2 (2020, 2021)
2024 championship position	6th (152 pts)
Starts / Wins / Podiums / Poles / F. laps / Points; 57 / 5 / 17 / 10 / 4 / 673
Superbike World Championship
Active years	2015–2019
Manufacturers	Aprilia, BMW, MV Agusta, Kawasaki
Championships	0
2019 championship position	11th (135 pts)
Starts / Wins / Podiums / Poles / F. laps / Points; 136 / 1 / 4 / 0 / 0 / 851
Supersport World Championship
Active years	2006
Manufacturers	Yamaha
Championships	0
2006 championship position	NC (0 pts)
Starts / Wins / Podiums / Poles / F. laps / Points; 2 / 0 / 0 / 0 / 0 / 0

Jordi Torres Fernández (born August 27, 1987) is a Spanish motorcycle racer. He is a two-time MotoE World Cup winner, having won in 2020 and 2021.

Torres is a two-time winner of the Spanish Moto2 Championship, and a two-time winner of the European Supersport Championship, having won both series in 2011 and 2012. He has previously competed in his native Supersport and Stock Extreme championships, and is best known for winning the 2013 German Grand Prix, in the Moto2 class; having qualified in a career-best second place, Torres overtook long-time race leader Pol Espargaró with ten laps remaining, and held on to win the race, his first Grand Prix podium. From 2015 to 2019, he competed in the Superbike World Championship.

== Career statistics ==
=== Supersport World Championship ===
==== Races by year ====
(key) (Races in bold indicate pole position; races in italics indicate fastest lap)

Year	Bike	1	2	3	4	5	6	7	8	9	10	11	12	Pos	Pts
2006	Yamaha	QAT	AUS	SPA; DSQ	ITA	EUR	SMR	CZE	GBR	NED	GER	ITA; 24	FRA	NC	0

=== FIM Superstock 1000 Cup ===
==== Races by year ====
(key) (Races in bold indicate pole position) (Races in italics indicate fastest lap)

Year	Bike	1	2	3	4	5	6	7	8	9	10	11	Pos	Pts
2007	Yamaha	DON	VAL; 21	NED	MNZ	SIL	SMR	BRN	BRA	LAU	ITA	MAG	NC	0
2008	Honda	VAL; Ret	NED	MNZ	NŰR	SMR	BRN	BRA	DON	MAG	ALG		NC	0

=== Grand Prix motorcycle racing ===
==== By season ====
Season	Class	Motorcycle	Team	Race	Win	Podium	Pole	FLap	Pts	Plcd	WCh
2010	Moto2	Promoharris	MR Griful	1	0	0	0	0	0	NC	–
2011	Moto2	Suter	Mapfre Aspar Team Moto2	10	0	0	0	0	0	NC	–
2012	Moto2	Tech 3	Tech 3 Racing	1	0	0	0	0	0	19th	–
2012	Moto2	Suter	Mapfre Aspar Team Moto2	8	0	0	0	0	31	19th	–
2013	Moto2	Suter	Mapfre Aspar Team Moto2	17	1	3	0	1	128	10th	–
2014	Moto2	Suter	Mapfre Aspar Team Moto2	18	0	0	0	0	57	16th	–
2018	MotoGP	Ducati	Reale Avintia Racing	5	0	0	0	0	1	28th	–
2020	MotoE	Energica	Pons Racing 40	7	1	4	2	1	114	**1st**	1
2021	MotoE	Energica	Pons Racing 40	7	1	4	1	0	100	**1st**	1
2022	MotoE	Energica	Pons Racing 40	9	0	0	0	0	65	11th	–
2023	MotoE	Ducati V21L	Openbank Aspar Team	16	2	6	6	2	217	**2nd**	–
2023	Moto2	Kalex	Inde GasGas Aspar Team M2	2	0	0	0	0	0	32nd	–
2024	MotoE	Ducati	Openbank Aspar Team	16	0	2	0	0	152	6th	–
2025	MotoE	Ducati V21L	Power Electronics Aspar Team	2	0	1	0	0	25*	5th*	–
Total				**119**	**5**	**20**	**10**	**4**	**994**		**2**

==== By class ====
Class	Seasons	1st GP	1st Pod	1st Win	Race	Win	Podiums	Pole	FLap	Pts	WChmp
Moto2	2010–2014	2010 Catalunya	2013 Germany	2013 Germany	57	1	3	0	1	216	0
MotoGP	2018	2018 Aragon			5	0	0	0	0	1	0
MotoE	2020–present	2020 Spain	2020 Andalusia	2020 France Race 1	57	4	17	10	3	673	2
Total	2010–2014, 2018, 2020–present				**119**	**5**	**20**	**10**	**4**	**994**	**2**

==== Races by year ====
(key) (Races in bold indicate pole position, races in italics indicate fastest lap)

Year	Class	Bike	1	2	3	4	5	6	7	8	9	10	11	12	13	14	15	16	17	18	19	20	Pos	Pts
2010	Moto2	Promoharris	QAT	SPA	FRA	ITA	GBR	NED	CAT; 19	GER	CZE	INP	RSM	ARA	JPN	MAL	AUS	POR	VAL				NC	0
2011	Moto2	Suter	QAT	SPA	POR	FRA	CAT	GBR; Ret	NED	ITA; 19	GER; 21	CZE; 19	INP; 18	RSM; DNS	ARA; 20	JPN; Ret	AUS; Ret	MAL; 17	VAL; 18				NC	0
2012	Moto2	Tech 3	QAT	SPA	POR	FRA	CAT; 16	GBR	NED	GER	ITA												19th	31
2012	Moto2	Suter										INP; 18	CZE; 13	RSM; 16	ARA; 8	JPN; 12	MAL; Ret	AUS; 10	VAL; 6				19th	31
2013	Moto2	Suter	QAT; 11	AME; 13	SPA; 7	FRA; Ret	ITA; 6	CAT; Ret	NED; 9	GER; 1	INP; 10	CZE; 10	GBR; 13	RSM; 15	ARA; 6	MAL; 9	AUS; 3	JPN; Ret	VAL; 2				10th	128
2014	Moto2	Suter	QAT; 8	AME; 26	ARG; 10	SPA; 12	FRA; 17	ITA; 11	CAT; Ret	NED; 26	GER; Ret	INP; 12	CZE; 18	GBR; 11	RSM; 21	ARA; 8	JPN; 11	AUS; 10	MAL; 15	VAL; 11			16th	57
2018	MotoGP	Ducati	QAT	ARG	AME	SPA	FRA	ITA	CAT	NED	GER	CZE	AUT	GBR	RSM	ARA; 20	THA; 19	JPN; 17	AUS; 17	MAL; DNS	VAL; 15		28th	1
2020	MotoE	Energica	SPA; 6	ANC; 2	RSM; 4	**EMI1**; 2	EMI2; 3	**FRA1**; 1	FRA2; 6														1st	114
2021	MotoE	Energica	SPA; 3	FRA; 5	CAT; 3	NED; 2	AUT; 7	**RSM1**; 1	**RSM2**; 13														1st	100
2022	MotoE	Energica	SPA1; 5	SPA2; 7	FRA1; Ret	FRA2; DNS	ITA1	ITA2	NED1; 9	NED2; 16	AUT1; 8	AUT2; 10	RSM1; 4	RSM2; 5									11th	65
2023	MotoE	Ducati	FRA1; 1	FRA2; 2	ITA1; 9	ITA2; 5	**GER1**; 1	**GER2**; 3	**NED1**; 2	**NED2**; 2	GBR1; 5	GBR2; 4	AUT1; 5	AUT2; 6	**CAT1**; 7	**CAT2**; Ret	RSM1; 10	RSM2; 4					2nd	217
2023	Moto2	Kalex	POR; 23	ARG; 16	AME	SPA	FRA	ITA	GER	NED	GBR	AUT	CAT	RSM	IND	JPN	INA	AUS	THA	MAL	QAT	VAL	32nd	0
2024	MotoE	Ducati	POR1; Ret	POR2; 5	FRA1; 4	FRA2; Ret	CAT1; 7	CAT2; 4	ITA1; Ret	ITA2; 12	NED1; 3	NED2; 5	GER1; 5	GER2; 3	AUT1; 5	AUT2; 4	RSM1; 5	RSM2; 4					6th	152
2025	MotoE	Ducati	FRA1; 7	FRA2; 3	NED1; 3	NED2; 4	AUT1; 10	AUT2; 9	HUN1; Ret	HUN2; 11	CAT1; 9	CAT2; Ret	RSM1; 7	RSM2; Ret	POR1; 9	POR2; 7							11th	104

=== Harley-Davidson Bagger World Cup ===
==== Races by year ====
(key) (Races in bold indicate pole position, races in italics indicate fastest lap)

Year	1		2		3		4		5		6		Pos	Pts
Year	R1	R2	R1	R2	R1	R2	R1	R2	R1	R2	R1	R2	Pos	Pts
2026	USA	USA	ITA	ITA	NED; 5	NED; 4	GBR; 5	GBR; 3	SPA; 4	SPA; 4	AUT	AUT	8th	77

=== Superbike World Championship ===
==== Races by year ====
(key) (Races in bold indicate pole position; races in italics indicate fastest lap)

Year	Bike	1		2		3		4		5		6		7		8		9		10		11		12		13		Pos	Pts
Year	Bike	R1	R2	R1	R2	R1	R2	R1	R2	R1	R2	R1	R2	R1	R2	R1	R2	R1	R2	R1	R2	R1	R2	R1	R2	R1	R2	Pos	Pts
2015	Aprilia	AUS; 4	AUS; Ret	THA; 4	THA; 4	SPA; 5	SPA; 4	NED; 6	NED; 6	ITA; Ret	ITA; 3	GBR; 7	GBR; 7	POR; 11	POR; 7	ITA; Ret	ITA; 7	USA; 5	USA; 4	MAL; 10	MAL; 3	SPA; 12	SPA; 2	FRA; 12	FRA; 8	QAT; 1	QAT; Ret	5th	247
2016	BMW	AUS; 8	AUS; 7	THA; 8	THA; 8	SPA; 7	SPA; 5	NED; 5	NED; 15	ITA; 4	ITA; 7	MAL; 4	MAL; 13	GBR; 7	GBR; 11	ITA; 5	ITA; 7	USA; 8	USA; 6	GER; 4	GER; Ret	FRA; 14	FRA; 7	SPA; 8	SPA; 8	QAT; 8	QAT; 6	6th	213
2017	BMW	AUS; 7	AUS; Ret	THA; 7	THA; 5	SPA; 6	SPA; 7	NED; Ret	NED; 7	ITA; DNS	ITA; 8	GBR; 9	GBR; Ret	ITA; 4	ITA; Ret	USA; 7	USA; Ret	GER; 9	GER; 8	POR; 6	POR; 5	FRA; 14	FRA; 8	SPA; 13	SPA; 10	QAT; 7	QAT; Ret	9th	158
2018	MV Agusta	AUS; Ret	AUS; 8	THA; 10	THA; Ret	SPA; Ret	SPA; 8	NED; 9	NED; 6	ITA; 14	ITA; 5	GBR; 11	GBR; 9	CZE; Ret	CZE; Ret	USA; 9	USA; 7	ITA; 18	ITA; Ret	POR; 7	POR; 13	FRA; 12	FRA; 14	ARG	ARG	QAT	QAT	13th	98

Year	Bike	1			2			3			4			5			6			7			8			9			10			11			12			13			Pos	Pts
Year	Bike	R1	SR	R2	R1	SR	R2	R1	SR	R2	R1	SR	R2	R1	SR	R2	R1	SR	R2	R1	SR	R2	R1	SR	R2	R1	SR	R2	R1	SR	R2	R1	SR	R2	R1	SR	R2	R1	SR	R2	Pos	Pts
2019	Kawasaki	AUS; 11	AUS; 17	AUS; 14	THA; 11	THA; 13	THA; 10	SPA; 10	SPA; 8	SPA; 7	NED; 8	NED; C	NED; 10	ITA; 11	ITA; 9	ITA; C	SPA; Ret	SPA; 8	SPA; 8	ITA; 12	ITA; 11	ITA; 10	GBR; Ret	GBR; 9	GBR; Ret	USA; 6	USA; 8	USA; 8	POR; 11	POR; 12	POR; 11	FRA; 11	FRA; 15	FRA; 10	ARG; 8	ARG; 11	ARG; 9	QAT; Ret	QAT; 14	QAT; 13	11th	135

=== FIM Endurance World Cup ===
Year	Team	Bike	Tyre	Rider	Pts	TC
2025	(Poland) Wójcik Racing Team #777 SST	Honda CBR1000RR	**D**	(Poland) Mateusz Molik (Poland) Milan Pawelec (Spain) Jordi Torres	48	10th

=== Suzuka 8 Hours results ===
Year	Team	Riders	Bike	Pos
2025	(Japan) Honda Suzuka Racing Team	(Spain) Jordi Torres (Poland) Milan Pawelec (Poland) Mateusz Molik	Honda CBR1000RR	19th

Sporting positions
Preceded by Carmelo Morales	CEV Moto2 champion 2011–2012	Succeeded by Román Ramos
Preceded by Carmelo Morales	European Supersport champion 2011–2012	Succeeded by Román Ramos
