= 2023 San Marino and Rimini Riviera motorcycle Grand Prix =

Motorcycle races in Misano Adriatico

2023 San Marino and Rimini Riviera Grand Prix
Race details
- Race 12 of 20 races in the 2023 Grand Prix motorcycle racing season
- Date: 9–10 September 2023
- Official name: Gran Premio Red Bull di San Marino e della Riviera di Rimini
- Location: Misano World Circuit Marco Simoncelli; Misano Adriatico, Province of Rimini, Italy
- Course: Permanent racing facility; 4.226 km (2.626 mi)

MotoGP
Pole position
Rider	(Spain) Jorge Martín	Ducati
Time	1:30.390	
Fastest lap
Rider	(Italy) Francesco Bagnaia	Ducati
Time	1:31.791 on lap 7	
Podium
First	(Spain) Jorge Martín	Ducati
Second	(Italy) Marco Bezzecchi	Ducati
Third	(Italy) Francesco Bagnaia	Ducati

Moto2
Pole position
Rider	(Italy) Celestino Vietti	Kalex
Time	1:36.201	
Fastest lap
Rider	(Italy) Celestino Vietti	Kalex
Time	1:36.173 on lap 10	
Podium
First	(Spain) Pedro Acosta	Kalex
Second	(Italy) Celestino Vietti	Kalex
Third	(Spain) Alonso López	Boscoscuro

Moto3
Pole position
Rider	(Spain) Jaume Masià	Honda
Time	1:41.638	
Fastest lap
Rider	(Colombia) David Alonso	Gas Gas
Time	1:41.297 on lap 19	
Podium
First	(Colombia) David Alonso	Gas Gas
Second	(Spain) Jaume Masià	Honda
Third	(Turkey) Deniz Öncü	KTM

MotoE Race 1
Pole position
Rider	(Italy) Mattia Casadei (Note: Matteo Ferrari, who initially set the fastest time during qualifying, was penalized for illegal tyre pressures during the second qualifying session. His lap time which led to him qualifying on pole was cancelled and he was also disqualified from Q2, leading him to start tenth on the grid. Mattia Casadei, who initially finished second in Q2, was promoted to the pole position grid slot during the race and was also officially awarded the pole position statistic.)	Ducati
Time	1:40.731	
Fastest lap
Rider	(Spain) Héctor Garzó	Ducati
Time	1:40.593 on lap 4	
Podium
First	(Italy) Mattia Casadei	Ducati
Second	(Spain) Héctor Garzó	Ducati
Third	(Italy) Nicholas Spinelli	Ducati

MotoE Race 2
Pole position
Rider	(Italy) Mattia Casadei	Ducati
Time	1:40.731	
Fastest lap
Rider	(Spain) Héctor Garzó	Ducati
Time	1:40.644 on lap 4	
Podium
First	(Italy) Nicholas Spinelli	Ducati
Second	(Spain) Héctor Garzó	Ducati
Third	(Italy) Mattia Casadei	Ducati

The 2023 San Marino and Rimini Riviera motorcycle Grand Prix (officially known as the Gran Premio Red Bull di San Marino e della Riviera di Rimini) was the twelfth round of the 2023 Grand Prix motorcycle racing season and the eighth and final round of the 2023 MotoE World Championship. All races (except for both MotoE races which were held on 9 September) were held at the Misano World Circuit Marco Simoncelli in Misano Adriatico on 10 September 2023.

In the MotoE class, Mattia Casadei became the first-ever MotoE World Riders' Champion after winning race 1.

== Practice ==
=== MotoGP ===
==== Combined Free Practice Session 1-2 ====
Free Practice sessions on Friday and Saturday do not determine riders to qualify for Q2.

Fastest session lap

Pos.	No.	Biker	Constructor	Free practice times	
Pos.	No.	Biker	Constructor	FP1	FP2
1	89	(Spain) Jorge Martín	Ducati	1:32.066	**1:31.803**
2	51	(Italy) Michele Pirro	Ducati	**1:31.909**	1:32.169
3	10	(Italy) Luca Marini	Ducati	**1:32.024**	1:32.208
4	72	(Italy) Marco Bezzecchi	Ducati	**1:32.090**	1:32.507
5	1	(Italy) Francesco Bagnaia	Ducati	1:32.599	**1:32.227**
6	25	(Spain) Raúl Fernández	Aprilia	**1:32.227**	1:32.345
7	12	(Spain) Maverick Viñales	Aprilia	1:32.275	**1:32.246**
8	26	(Spain) Dani Pedrosa	KTM	**1:32.250**	1:32.457
9	73	(Spain) Álex Márquez	Ducati	1:32.349	**1:32.277**
10	33	(South Africa) Brad Binder	KTM	1:32.390	**1:32.297**
11	93	(Spain) Marc Márquez	Honda	1:32.674	**1:32.299**
12	5	(France) Johann Zarco	Ducati	**1:32.301**	1:32.530
13	88	(Portugal) Miguel Oliveira	Aprilia	1:32.559	**1:32.327**
14	41	(Spain) Aleix Espargaró	Aprilia	**1:32.327**	1:32.513
15	49	(Italy) Fabio Di Giannantonio	Ducati	1:32.554	**1:32.354**
16	20	(France) Fabio Quartararo	Yamaha	1:32.510	**1:32.367**
17	43	(Australia) Jack Miller	KTM	1:32.509	**1:32.384**
18	21	(Italy) Franco Morbidelli	Yamaha	**1:32.395**	1:33.003
19	44	(Spain) Pol Espargaró	KTM	**1:32.404**	1:32.482
20	37	(Spain) Augusto Fernández	KTM	1:33.201	**1:32.492**
21	6	(Germany) Stefan Bradl	Honda	**1:32.538**	1:33.011
22	30	(Japan) Takaaki Nakagami	Honda	**1:32.571**	1:32.709
23	36	(Spain) Joan Mir	Honda	1:33.228	**1:32.832**
105% time:				1:36.504	1:36.393
24	7	(Japan) Takumi Takahashi	Honda	1:37.894	**1:36.989**
OFFICIAL MOTOGP COMBINED FREE PRACTICE TIMES REPORT

==== Practice session ====
The top ten riders (written in bold) qualified for Q2.

Pos.	No.	Biker	Constructor	
Pos.	No.	Biker	Constructor	Time results
1	72	**(Italy) Marco Bezzecchi**	**Ducati**	**1:30.846**
2	12	**(Spain) Maverick Viñales**	**Aprilia**	**1:30.972**
3	26	**(Spain) Dani Pedrosa**	**KTM**	**1:31.101**
4	89	**(Spain) Jorge Martín**	**Ducati**	**1:31.177**
5	10	**(Italy) Luca Marini**	**Ducati**	**1:31.187**
6	93	**(Spain) Marc Márquez**	**Honda**	**1:31.217**
7	1	**(Italy) Francesco Bagnaia**	**Ducati**	**1:31.220**
8	73	**(Spain) Álex Márquez**	**Ducati**	**1:31.247**
9	33	**(South Africa) Brad Binder**	**KTM**	**1:31.256**
10	25	**(Spain) Raúl Fernández**	**Aprilia**	**1:31.536**
11	44	(Spain) Pol Espargaró	KTM	1:31.560
12	41	(Spain) Aleix Espargaró	Aprilia	1:31.619
13	20	(France) Fabio Quartararo	Yamaha	1:31.644
14	21	(Italy) Franco Morbidelli	Yamaha	1:31.710
15	6	(Germany) Stefan Bradl	Honda	1:31.715
16	51	(Italy) Michele Pirro	Ducati	1:31.743
17	43	(Australia) Jack Miller	KTM	1:31.781
18	5	(France) Johann Zarco	Ducati	1:31.785
19	49	(Italy) Fabio Di Giannantonio	Ducati	1:31.821
20	30	(Japan) Takaaki Nakagami	Honda	1:32.107
21	36	(Spain) Joan Mir	Honda	1:32.141
22	88	(Portugal) Miguel Oliveira	Aprilia	1:32.354
23	37	(Spain) Augusto Fernández	KTM	1:32.613
**105% time: 1:35.388**
DNQ	7	(Japan) Takumi Takahashi	Honda	1:35.886
OFFICIAL MOTOGP PRACTICE TIMES REPORT

== Qualifying ==
=== MotoGP ===
Fastest session lap

Pos.	No.	Biker	Constructor	Qualifying times		Final grid	Row
Pos.	No.	Biker	Constructor	Q1	Q2	Final grid	Row
1	89	(Spain) Jorge Martín	Ducati	Qualified in Q2	1:30.390	1	1
2	72	(Italy) Marco Bezzecchi	Ducati	Qualified in Q2	1:30.787	2	1
3	1	(Italy) Francesco Bagnaia	Ducati	Qualified in Q2	1:30.826	3	1
4	12	(Spain) Maverick Viñales	Aprilia	Qualified in Q2	1:30.916	4	2
5	26	(Spain) Dani Pedrosa	KTM	Qualified in Q2	1:31.023	5	2
6	41	(Spain) Aleix Espargaró	Aprilia	1:31.429	1:31.082	6	2
7	33	(South Africa) Brad Binder	KTM	Qualified in Q2	1:31.103	7	3
8	10	(Italy) Luca Marini	Ducati	Qualified in Q2	1:31.210	8	3
9	93	(Spain) Marc Márquez	Honda	Qualified in Q2	1:31.223	9	3
10	88	(Portugal) Miguel Oliveira	Aprilia	1:31.272	1:31.277	10	4
11	73	(Spain) Álex Márquez	Ducati	Qualified in Q2	1:31.278	11	4
12	25	(Spain) Raúl Fernández	Aprilia	Qualified in Q2	1:31.341	12	4
13	20	(France) Fabio Quartararo	Yamaha	1:31.467	N/A	13	5
14	51	(Italy) Michele Pirro	Ducati	1:31.533	N/A	14	5
15	6	(Germany) Stefan Bradl	Honda	1:31.560	N/A	15	5
16	5	(France) Johann Zarco	Ducati	1:31.667	N/A	16	6
17	37	(Spain) Augusto Fernández	KTM	1:31.678	N/A	17	6
18	43	(Australia) Jack Miller	KTM	1:31.713	N/A	18	6
19	21	(Italy) Franco Morbidelli	Yamaha	1:31.845	N/A	19	7
20	30	(Japan) Takaaki Nakagami	Honda	1:31.851	N/A	20	7
21	49	(Italy) Fabio Di Giannantonio	Ducati	1:31.914	N/A	21	7
22	36	(Spain) Joan Mir	Honda	1:31.944	N/A	22	8
23	44	(Spain) Pol Espargaró	KTM	1:32.140	N/A	23	8
OFFICIAL MOTOGP QUALIFYING RESULTS

=== Moto2 ===
Fastest session lap

Pos.	No.	Biker	Constructor	Qualifying times		Final grid	Row
Pos.	No.	Biker	Constructor	Q1	Q2	Final grid	Row
1	13	(Italy) Celestino Vietti	Kalex	Qualified in Q2	1:36.201	1	1
2	37	(Spain) Pedro Acosta	Kalex	Qualified in Q2	1:36.281	2	1
3	18	(Spain) Manuel González	Kalex	1:36.754	1:36.421	3	1
4	40	(Spain) Arón Canet	Kalex	Qualified in Q2	1:36.424	4	2
5	34	(Italy) Mattia Pasini	Kalex	Qualified in Q2	1:36.484	5	2
6	21	(Spain) Alonso López	Boscoscuro	Qualified in Q2	1:36.487	6	2
7	16	(United States) Joe Roberts	Kalex	Qualified in Q2	1:36.534	7	3
8	22	(United Kingdom) Sam Lowes	Kalex	Qualified in Q2	1:36.541	8	3
9	14	(Italy) Tony Arbolino	Kalex	1:36.677	1:36.559	9	3
10	12	(Czech Republic) Filip Salač	Kalex	Qualified in Q2	1:36.639	10	5
11	35	(Thailand) Somkiat Chantra	Kalex	Qualified in Q2	1:36.649	11	5
12	84	(Netherlands) Zonta van den Goorbergh	Kalex	1:36.791	1:36.722	12	5
13	79	(Japan) Ai Ogura	Kalex	Qualified in Q2	1:36.816	13	6
14	96	(United Kingdom) Jake Dixon	Kalex	Qualified in Q2	1:36.889	14	6
15	64	(Netherlands) Bo Bendsneyder	Kalex	1:36.676	1:36.919	15	6
16	42	(Spain) Marcos Ramírez	Forward	Qualified in Q2	1:37.207	16	7
17	7	(Belgium) Barry Baltus	Kalex	Qualified in Q2	1:37.215	17	7
18	52	(Spain) Jeremy Alcoba	Kalex	Qualified in Q2	1:37.245	18	7
19	28	(Spain) Izan Guevara	Kalex	1:36.859	N/A	19	8
20	8	(Australia) Senna Agius	Kalex	1:36.967	N/A	20	8
21	54	(Spain) Fermín Aldeguer	Boscoscuro	1:36.992	N/A	21	8
22	11	(Spain) Sergio García	Kalex	1:37.015	N/A	22	9
23	71	(Italy) Dennis Foggia	Kalex	1:37.051	N/A	23	9
24	67	(Italy) Alberto Surra	Forward	1:37.415	N/A	24	9
25	3	(Germany) Lukas Tulovic	Kalex	1:37.621	N/A	25	10
26	33	(United Kingdom) Rory Skinner	Kalex	1:37.701	N/A	26	10
27	5	(Japan) Kohta Nozane	Kalex	1:37.867	N/A	27	10
28	72	(Spain) Borja Gómez	Kalex	1:37.917	N/A	28	11
29	4	(United States) Sean Dylan Kelly	Forward	1:37.923	N/A	29	11
30	23	(Japan) Taiga Hada	Kalex	1:38.126	N/A	30	11
OFFICIAL MOTO2 QUALIFYING RESULTS

=== Moto3 ===
Fastest session lap

Pos.	No.	Biker	Constructor	Qualifying times		Final grid	Row
Pos.	No.	Biker	Constructor	Q1	Q2	Final grid	Row
1	5	(Spain) Jaume Masià	Honda	Qualified in Q2	1:41.638	1	1
2	71	(Japan) Ayumu Sasaki	Husqvarna	Qualified in Q2	1:41.811	2	1
3	27	(Japan) Kaito Toba	Honda	Qualified in Q2	1:41.900	3	1
4	10	(Brazil) Diogo Moreira	KTM	Qualified in Q2	1:42.002	4	2
5	53	(Turkey) Deniz Öncü	KTM	Qualified in Q2	1:42.056	5	2
6	80	(Colombia) David Alonso	Gas Gas	Qualified in Q2	1:42.058	6	2
7	44	(Spain) David Muñoz	Honda	1:43.081	1:42.100	7	3
8	96	(Spain) Daniel Holgado	KTM	1:42.467	1:42.125	8	3
9	82	(Italy) Stefano Nepa	KTM	Qualified in Q2	1:42.168	9	3
10	95	(Netherlands) Collin Veijer	Husqvarna	Qualified in Q2	1:42.234	10	4
11	66	(Australia) Joel Kelso	CFMoto	1:42.954	1:42.277	11	4
12	99	(Spain) José Antonio Rueda	KTM	Qualified in Q2	1:42.395	12	4
13	48	(Spain) Iván Ortolá	KTM	Qualified in Q2	1:42.428	13	5
14	72	(Japan) Taiyo Furusato	Honda	Qualified in Q2	1:42.643	14	5
15	6	(Japan) Ryusei Yamanaka	Gas Gas	Qualified in Q2	1:42.657	15	5
16	24	(Japan) Tatsuki Suzuki	Honda	Qualified in Q2	1:42.684	16	6
17	54	(Italy) Riccardo Rossi	Honda	1:42.903	1:42.751	17	6
18	55	(Italy) Romano Fenati	Honda	Qualified in Q2	1:42.847	18	6
19	18	(Italy) Matteo Bertelle	Honda	1:43.117	N/A	19	7
20	43	(Spain) Xavier Artigas	CFMoto	1:43.154	N/A	20	7
21	70	(United Kingdom) Joshua Whatley	Honda	1:43.307	N/A	21	7
22	7	(Italy) Filippo Farioli	KTM	1:43.381	N/A	22	8
23	38	(Spain) David Salvador	KTM	1:43.449	N/A	23	8
24	19	(United Kingdom) Scott Ogden	Honda	1:43.451	N/A	24	8
25	20	(France) Lorenzo Fellon	KTM	1:43.530	N/A	25	9
26	64	(Indonesia) Mario Aji	Honda	1:43.817	N/A	26	9
27	63	(Malaysia) Syarifuddin Azman	KTM	1:43.829	N/A	27	9
28	22	(Spain) Ana Carrasco	KTM	1:44.055	N/A	28	10
OFFICIAL MOTO3 QUALIFYING RESULTS

== MotoGP Sprint ==
The MotoGP Sprint was held on 9 September.

Pos.	No.	Rider	Team	Constructor	Laps	Time/Retired	Grid	Points
1	89	(Spain) Jorge Martín	Prima Pramac Racing	Ducati	13	19:58.785	1	12
2	72	(Italy) Marco Bezzecchi	Mooney VR46 Racing Team	Ducati	13	+1.445	2	9
3	1	(Italy) Francesco Bagnaia	Ducati Lenovo Team	Ducati	13	+4.582	3	7
4	26	(Spain) Dani Pedrosa	Red Bull KTM Factory Racing	KTM	13	+4.772	5	6
5	33	(South Africa) Brad Binder	Red Bull KTM Factory Racing	KTM	13	+4.931	7	5
6	12	(Spain) Maverick Viñales	Aprilia Racing	Aprilia	13	+6.062	4	4
7	10	(Italy) Luca Marini	Mooney VR46 Racing Team	Ducati	13	+6.519	8	3
8	41	(Spain) Aleix Espargaró	Aprilia Racing	Aprilia	13	+7.893	6	2
9	73	(Spain) Álex Márquez	Gresini Racing MotoGP	Ducati	13	+9.264	11	1
10	93	(Spain) Marc Márquez	Repsol Honda Team	Honda	13	+11.318	9	
11	25	(Spain) Raúl Fernández	CryptoData RNF MotoGP Team	Aprilia	13	+13.365	12	
12	88	(Portugal) Miguel Oliveira	CryptoData RNF MotoGP Team	Aprilia	13	+13.788	10	
13	20	(France) Fabio Quartararo	Monster Energy Yamaha MotoGP	Yamaha	13	+14.243	13	
14 (Note: One position penalty for exceeding track limits on the final lap.)	5	(France) Johann Zarco	Prima Pramac Racing	Ducati	13	+14.154	16	
15	43	(Australia) Jack Miller	Red Bull KTM Factory Racing	KTM	13	+17.421	18	
16	44	(Spain) Pol Espargaró	GasGas Factory Racing Tech3	KTM	13	+17.451 (Note: Three-second penalty for exceeding track limits.)	23	
17	49	(Italy) Fabio Di Giannantonio	Gresini Racing MotoGP	Ducati	13	+18.133	21	
18	21	(Italy) Franco Morbidelli	Monster Energy Yamaha MotoGP	Yamaha	13	+19.749	19	
19	37	(Spain) Augusto Fernández	GasGas Factory Racing Tech3	KTM	13	+20.403	17	
20	51	(Italy) Michele Pirro	Aruba.it Racing	Ducati	13	+21.454	14	
21	30	(Japan) Takaaki Nakagami	LCR Honda Idemitsu	Honda	13	+21.962	20	
22	6	(Germany) Stefan Bradl	HRC Team	Honda	13	+23.672	15	
23	36	(Spain) Joan Mir	Repsol Honda Team	Honda	13	+36.100	22	
DNQ	7	(Japan) Takumi Takahashi	LCR Honda Castrol	Honda		Did not qualify		
Fastest sprint lap: (Italy) Marco Bezzecchi (Ducati) – 1:31.342 (lap 3)
OFFICIAL MOTOGP SPRINT REPORT

== Race ==
=== MotoGP ===
Pos.	No.	Rider	Team	Constructor	Laps	Time/Retired	Grid	Points
1	89	(Spain) Jorge Martín	Prima Pramac Racing	Ducati	27	41:33.421	1	25
2	72	(Italy) Marco Bezzecchi	Mooney VR46 Racing Team	Ducati	27	+1.350	2	20
3	1	(Italy) Francesco Bagnaia	Ducati Lenovo Team	Ducati	27	+3.812	3	16
4	26	(Spain) Dani Pedrosa	Red Bull KTM Factory Racing	KTM	27	+4.481	5	13
5	12	(Spain) Maverick Viñales	Aprilia Racing	Aprilia	27	+10.510	4	11
6	88	(Portugal) Miguel Oliveira	CryptoData RNF MotoGP Team	Aprilia	27	+12.274	10	10
7	93	(Spain) Marc Márquez	Repsol Honda Team	Honda	27	+13.576	9	9
8	25	(Spain) Raúl Fernández	CryptoData RNF MotoGP Team	Aprilia	27	+14.091	12	8
9	10	(Italy) Luca Marini	Mooney VR46 Racing Team	Ducati	27	+14.982	8	7
10	5	(France) Johann Zarco	Prima Pramac Racing	Ducati	27	+15.484	16	6
11	73	(Spain) Álex Márquez	Gresini Racing MotoGP	Ducati	27	+15.702	11	5
12	41	(Spain) Aleix Espargaró	Aprilia Racing	Aprilia	27	+15.878	6	4
13	20	(France) Fabio Quartararo	Monster Energy Yamaha MotoGP	Yamaha	27	+15.898	13	3
14	33	(South Africa) Brad Binder	Red Bull KTM Factory Racing	KTM	27	+23.778	7	2
15	21	(Italy) Franco Morbidelli	Monster Energy Yamaha MotoGP	Yamaha	27	+24.579	19	1
16	37	(Spain) Augusto Fernández	GasGas Factory Racing Tech3	KTM	27	+31.230	17	
17	49	(Italy) Fabio Di Giannantonio	Gresini Racing MotoGP	Ducati	27	+32.537	21	
18	6	(Germany) Stefan Bradl	HRC Team	Honda	27	+35.330	15	
19	30	(Japan) Takaaki Nakagami	LCR Honda Idemitsu	Honda	27	+43.601	20	
Ret	44	(Spain) Pol Espargaró	GasGas Factory Racing Tech3	KTM	15	Accident	23	
Ret	36	(Spain) Joan Mir	Repsol Honda Team	Honda	10	Accident	22	
Ret	43	(Australia) Jack Miller	Red Bull KTM Factory Racing	KTM	9	Collision	18	
Ret	51	(Italy) Michele Pirro	Aruba.it Racing	Ducati	9	Collision	14	
DNQ	7	(Japan) Takumi Takahashi	LCR Honda Castrol	Honda		Did not qualify		
Fastest lap: (Italy) Francesco Bagnaia (Ducati) – 1:31.791 (lap 7)
OFFICIAL MOTOGP RACE REPORT

=== Moto2 ===
Pos.	No.	Rider	Constructor	Laps	Time/Retired	Grid	Points
1	37	(Spain) Pedro Acosta	Kalex	22	35:30.145	2	25
2	13	(Italy) Celestino Vietti	Kalex	22	+6.305	1	20
3	21	(Spain) Alonso López	Boscoscuro	22	+9.989	6	16
4	14	(Italy) Tony Arbolino	Kalex	22	+11.344	9	13
5	79	(Japan) Ai Ogura	Kalex	22	+12.442	13	11
6	35	(Thailand) Somkiat Chantra	Kalex	22	+13.160	11	10
7	18	(Spain) Manuel González	Kalex	22	+13.907	3	9
8	16	(United States) Joe Roberts	Kalex	22	+20.350	7	8
9	12	(Czech Republic) Filip Salač	Kalex	22	+20.523	10	7
10	34	(Italy) Mattia Pasini	Kalex	22	+21.759	5	6
11	11	(Spain) Sergio García	Kalex	22	+21.989	22	5
12	96	(United Kingdom) Jake Dixon	Kalex	22	+22.900	14	4
13	64	(Netherlands) Bo Bendsneyder	Kalex	22	+23.747	15	3
14	24	(Spain) Marcos Ramírez	Kalex	22	+30.287	16	2
15	7	(Belgium) Barry Baltus	Kalex	22	+32.547	17	1
16	52	(Spain) Jeremy Alcoba	Kalex	22	+38.673	18	
17	67	(Italy) Alberto Surra	Forward	22	+46.029	23	
18	72	(Spain) Borja Gómez	Kalex	22	+51.346	28	
19	23	(Japan) Taiga Hada	Kalex	22	+52.716	30	
20	4	(United States) Sean Dylan Kelly	Forward	22	+55.208	29	
21	5	(Japan) Kohta Nozane	Kalex	22	+55.330	27	
Ret	3	(Germany) Lukas Tulovic	Kalex	21	Collision	24	
Ret	28	(Spain) Izan Guevara	Kalex	21	Collision	19	
Ret	22	(United Kingdom) Sam Lowes	Kalex	15	Accident	8	
Ret	54	(Spain) Fermín Aldeguer	Boscoscuro	14	Accident	21	
Ret	33	(United Kingdom) Rory Skinner	Kalex	9	Retired	25	
Ret	40	(Spain) Arón Canet	Kalex	7	Accident	4	
Ret	71	(Italy) Dennis Foggia	Kalex	3	Accident	26 (Note: Three-place grid penalty.)	
Ret	84	(Netherlands) Zonta van den Goorbergh	Kalex	3	Accident	12	
Ret	8	(Australia) Senna Agius	Kalex	2	Accident	20	
DNS	75	(Spain) Albert Arenas	Kalex		Did not start		
Fastest lap: (Italy) Celestino Vietti (Kalex) – 1:36.173 (lap 9)
OFFICIAL MOTO2 RACE REPORT

- Albert Arenas was declared unfit after Practice 2 due to a dislocated shoulder and withdrew from the race.

=== Moto3 ===
Pos.	No.	Rider	Constructor	Laps	Time/Retired	Grid	Points
1	80	(Colombia) David Alonso	Gas Gas	20	34:04.490	6	25
2	5	(Spain) Jaume Masià	Honda	20	+0.036	1	20
3	53	(Turkey) Deniz Öncü	KTM	20	+0.237	5	16
4	44	(Spain) David Muñoz	KTM	20	+0.764	7	13
5	95	(Netherlands) Collin Veijer	Husqvarna	20	+4.800	10	11
6	27	(Japan) Kaito Toba	Honda	20	+7.782	3	10
7	71	(Japan) Ayumu Sasaki	Husqvarna	20	+7.862	2	9
8	48	(Spain) Iván Ortolá	KTM	20	+8.072	13	8
9	99	(Spain) José Antonio Rueda	KTM	20	+8.167	12	7
10	55	(Italy) Romano Fenati	Honda	20	+8.353	18	6
11	72	(Japan) Taiyo Furusato	Honda	20	+8.402	14	5
12	10	(Brazil) Diogo Moreira	KTM	20	+9.075	4	4
13	82	(Italy) Stefano Nepa	KTM	20	+9.107	9	3
14	6	(Japan) Ryusei Yamanaka	Gas Gas	20	+10.846	15	2
15	24	(Japan) Tatsuki Suzuki	Honda	20	+11.352	16	1
16	96	(Spain) Daniel Holgado	KTM	20	+11.441	8	
17	43	(Spain) Xavier Artigas	CFMoto	20	+17.232	20	
18	54	(Italy) Riccardo Rossi	Honda	20	+17.356	17	
19	66	(Australia) Joel Kelso	CFMoto	20	+17.584	11	
20	18	(Italy) Matteo Bertelle	Honda	20	+17.616	19	
21	7	(Italy) Filippo Farioli	KTM	20	+20.479	22	
22	70	(United Kingdom) Joshua Whatley	Honda	20	+25.834	21	
23	19	(United Kingdom) Scott Ogden	Honda	20	+25.966	24	
24	20	(France) Lorenzo Fellon	KTM	20	+27.097	25	
25	63	(Malaysia) Syarifuddin Azman	KTM	20	+37.132	27	
26	64	(Indonesia) Mario Aji	Honda	20	+37.589	26	
27	22	(Spain) Ana Carrasco	KTM	20	+48.240	28	
Ret	38	(Spain) David Salvador	KTM	1	Accident	23	
Fastest lap: (Colombia) David Alonso (Gas Gas) – 1:41.297 (lap 19)
OFFICIAL MOTO3 RACE REPORT

=== MotoE ===
==== Race 1 ====
Pos.	No.	Rider	Laps	Time/Retired	Grid	Points
1	40	(Italy) Mattia Casadei	8	13:35.506	1	25
2	4	(Spain) Héctor Garzó	8	+0.021	3	20
3	29	(Italy) Nicholas Spinelli	8	+0.241	2	16
4	34	(Italy) Kevin Manfredi	8	+0.816	6	13
5	21	(Italy) Kevin Zannoni	8	+0.898	7	11
6	11	(Italy) Matteo Ferrari	8	+1.085	10	10
7	61	(Italy) Alessandro Zaccone	8	+5.562	8	9
8	3	(Switzerland) Randy Krummenacher	8	+7.406	12	8
9	78	(Japan) Hikari Okubo	8	+9.301	15	7
10	81	(Spain) Jordi Torres	8	+9.369	5	6
11	8	(Spain) Mika Pérez	8	+10.392	14	5
12	72	(Italy) Alessio Finello	8	+14.854	16	4
13	6	(Spain) María Herrera	8	+16.580	17	3
14	51	(Brazil) Eric Granado	8	+41.130	11	2
15	77	(Spain) Miquel Pons	8	+1:14.235	9	1
16	9	(Italy) Andrea Mantovani	7	+1 lap	4	
NC (Note: Not classified for completing an insufficient number of laps.)	16	(Italy) Andrea Migno	5	+3 laps	18	
Ret	53	(Spain) Tito Rabat	0	Accident	13	
Fastest lap: (Spain) Héctor Garzó – 1:40.593 (lap 4)
OFFICIAL MOTOE RACE NR.1 REPORT

- All bikes manufactured by Ducati.

==== Race 2 ====
Pos.	No.	Rider	Laps	Time/Retired	Grid	Points
1	29	(Italy) Nicholas Spinelli	8	13:34.056	2	25
2	4	(Spain) Héctor Garzó	8	+0.196	3	20
3	40	(Italy) Mattia Casadei	8	+0.429	1	16
4	81	(Spain) Jordi Torres	8	+1.000	5	13
5	9	(Italy) Andrea Mantovani	8	+0.726	4	11
6	21	(Italy) Kevin Zannoni	8	+1.080	7	10
7	11	(Italy) Matteo Ferrari	8	+1.493	10	9
8	53	(Spain) Tito Rabat	8	+4.060	13	8
9	77	(Spain) Miquel Pons	8	+5.891	9	7
10	61	(Italy) Alessandro Zaccone	8	+6.196	8	6
11	3	(Switzerland) Randy Krummenacher	8	+7.351	12	5
12	78	(Japan) Hikari Okubo	8	+10.783	15	4
13	8	(Spain) Mika Pérez	8	+14.695	14	3
14	16	(Italy) Andrea Migno	8	+17.767	18	2
15	72	(Italy) Alessio Finello	8	+18.060	16	1
16	6	(Spain) María Herrera	8	+19.993	17	
17	51	(Brazil) Eric Granado	8	+1:07.106	11	
18	34	(Italy) Kevin Manfredi	8	+1:25.840	6	
Fastest lap: (Spain) Héctor Garzó – 1:40.644 (lap 4)
OFFICIAL MOTOE RACE NR.2 REPORT

- All bikes manufactured by Ducati.

== Championship standings after the race ==
Below are the standings for the top five riders, constructors, and teams after the round.

=== MotoGP ===
Riders' Championship standings

Pos.	Rider	Points
1	(Italy) Francesco Bagnaia	283
2	(Spain) Jorge Martín	247
3	(Italy) Marco Bezzecchi	218
4	(South Africa) Brad Binder	173
5	(Spain) Aleix Espargaró	160

Constructors' Championship standings

	Pos.	Constructor	Points
	1	(Italy) Ducati	416
	2	(Austria) KTM	234
	3	(Italy) Aprilia	218
1	4	(Japan) Honda	105
1	5	(Japan) Yamaha	105

Teams' Championship standings

	Pos.	Team	Points
	1	(Italy) Prima Pramac Racing	394
	2	(Italy) Mooney VR46 Racing Team	353
	3	(Italy) Ducati Lenovo Team	318
1	4	(Italy) Aprilia Racing	288
1	5	(Austria) Red Bull KTM Factory Racing	277

=== Moto2 ===
Riders' Championship standings

Pos.	Rider	Points
1	(Spain) Pedro Acosta	211
2	(Italy) Tony Arbolino	177
3	(United Kingdom) Jake Dixon	146
4	(Spain) Arón Canet	116
5	(Spain) Alonso López	116

Constructors' Championship standings

Pos.	Constructor	Points
1	(Germany) Kalex	295
2	(Italy) Boscoscuro	155

Teams' Championship standings

	Pos.	Team	Points
	1	(Finland) Red Bull KTM Ajo	270
	2	(Belgium) Elf Marc VDS Racing Team	251
	3	(Italy) +Ego Speed Up	200
	4	(Spain) Pons Wegow Los40	179
1	5	(Japan) Idemitsu Honda Team Asia	164

=== Moto3 ===
Riders' Championship standings

	Pos.	Rider	Points
	1	(Spain) Daniel Holgado	161
	2	(Japan) Ayumu Sasaki	157
1	3	(Spain) Jaume Masià	149
1	4	(Turkey) Deniz Öncü	145
1	5	(Colombia) David Alonso	140

Constructors' Championship standings

Pos.	Constructor	Points
1	(Austria) KTM	259
2	(Japan) Honda	190
3	(Sweden) Husqvarna	162
4	(Spain) Gas Gas	157
5	(China) CFMoto	66

Teams' Championship standings

	Pos.	Team	Points
	1	(Finland) Red Bull KTM Ajo	233
	2	(Germany) Liqui Moly Husqvarna Intact GP	215
1	3	(Luxembourg) Leopard Racing	199
1	4	(Italy) Angeluss MTA Team	196
	5	(Spain) Gaviota GasGas Aspar Team	194

=== MotoE ===
Riders' Championship standings

Pos.	Rider	Points
1	(Italy) Mattia Casadei	260
2	(Spain) Jordi Torres	217
3	(Italy) Matteo Ferrari	216
4	(Spain) Héctor Garzó	215
5	(Switzerland) Randy Krummenacher	167

Teams' Championship standings

	Pos.	Team	Points
1	1	(Spain) HP Pons Los40	410
1	2	(Germany) Dynavolt Intact GP MotoE	382
	3	(Italy) Felo Gresini MotoE	251
1	4	(Italy) Ongetta Sic58 Squadracorse	247
1	5	(Monaco) LCR E-Team	237

== Notes ==
Previous race: 2023 Catalan Grand Prix	FIM Grand Prix World Championship; 2023 season	Next race: 2023 Indian Grand Prix
Previous race: 2022 San Marino Grand Prix	San Marino and Rimini Riviera motorcycle Grand Prix	Next race: 2024 San Marino Grand Prix
