= 2024 Moto2 World Championship =

15th running of the Moto2 World Championship

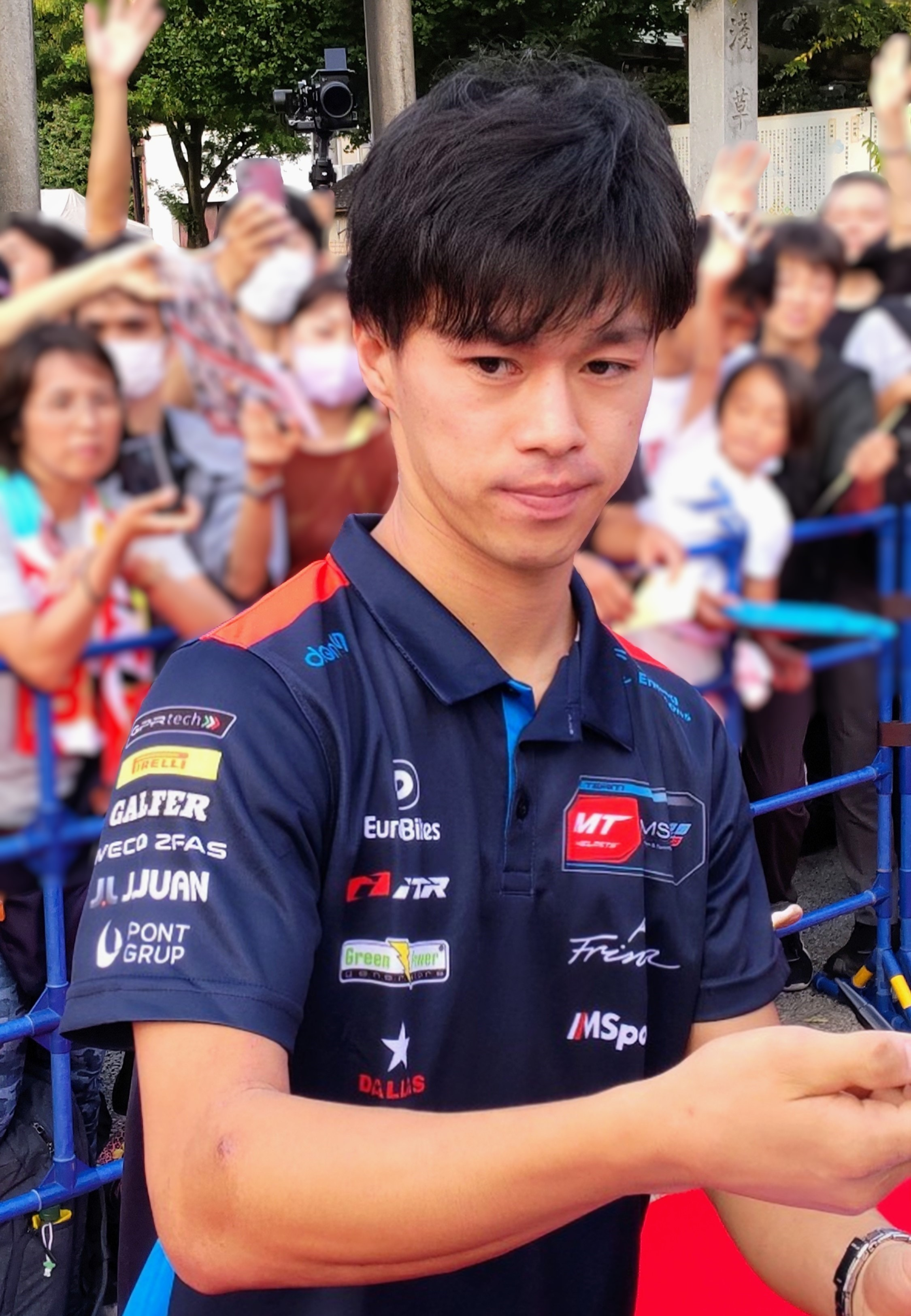
Ai Ogura was the 2024 Moto2 World Riders' Champion.

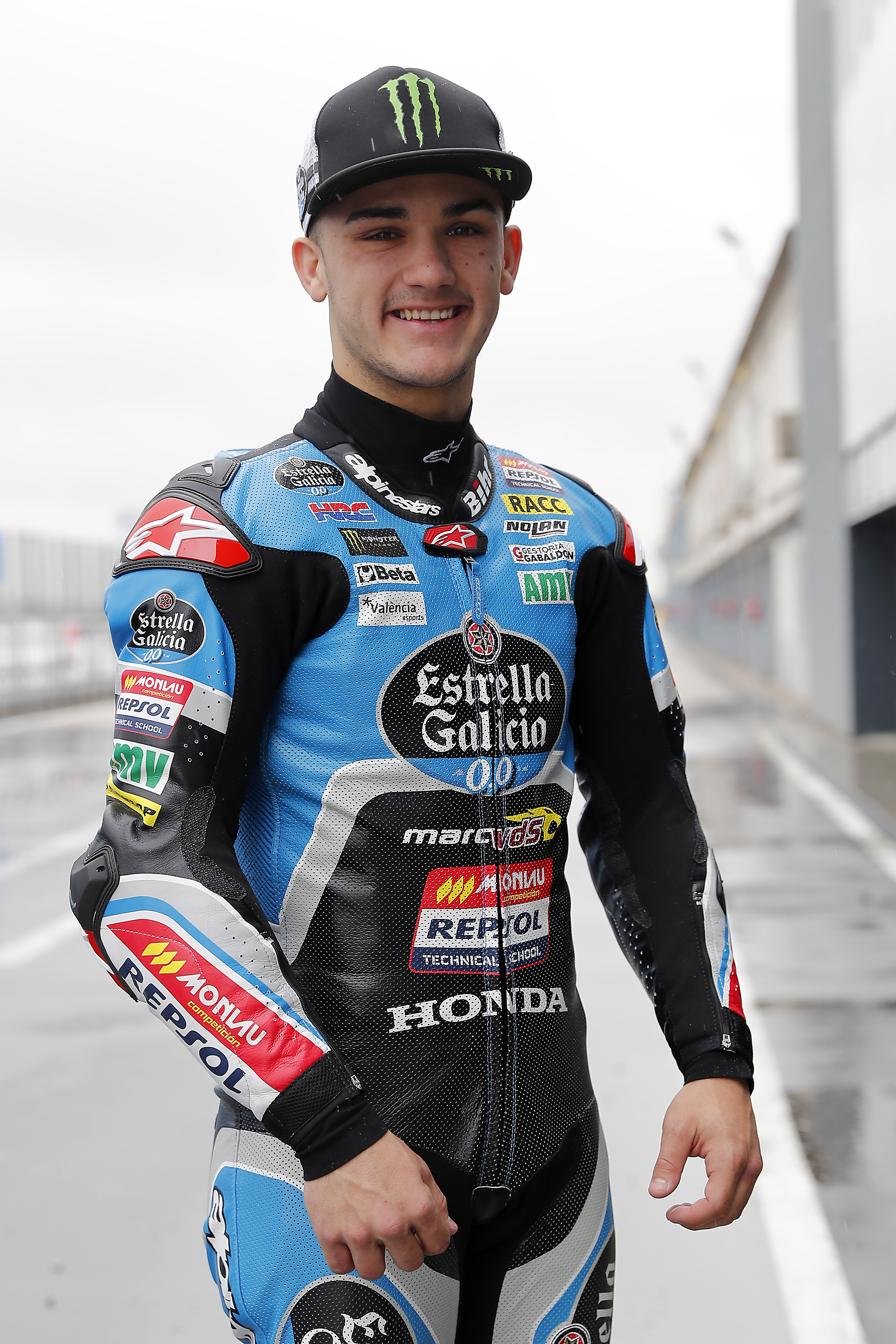
Arón Canet (pictured in 2018) finished runner-up.

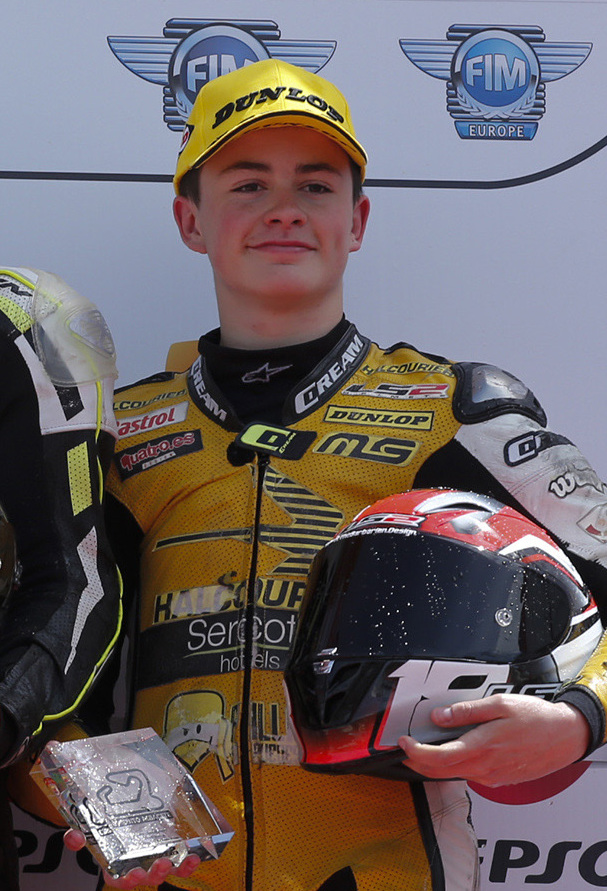
Manuel González (pictured in 2017) finished third.

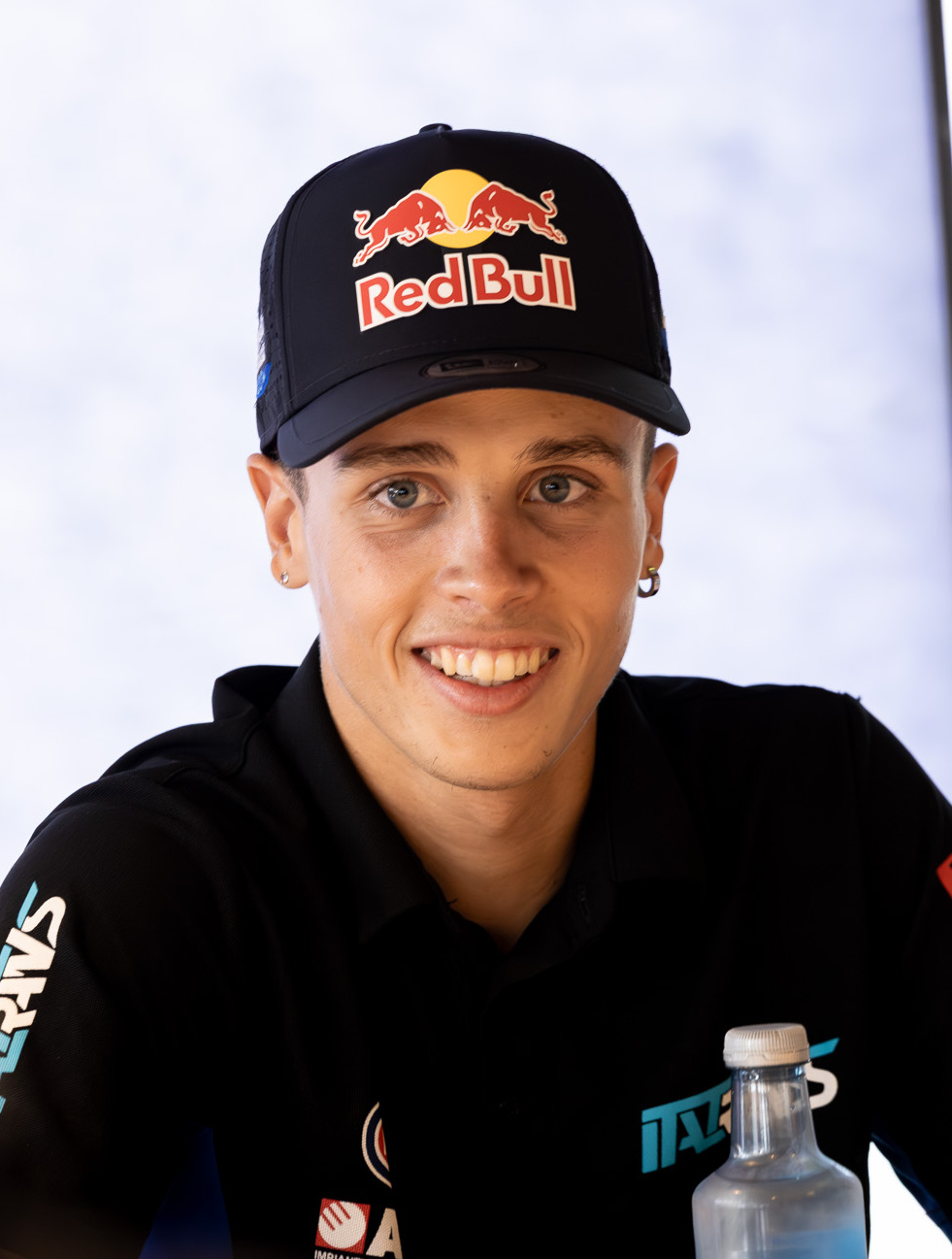
Diogo Moreira (pictured in 2025), the 2024 Moto2 Rookie of the Year.

The 2024 FIM Moto2 World Championship was the intermediate class of the 76th Fédération Internationale de Motocyclisme (FIM) Road Racing World Championship season. Ai Ogura won the championship with two races to spare in the Thailand Grand Prix.

== Teams and riders ==
Team	Constructor	Motorcycle	No.	Rider	Rounds
(Spain) MT Helmets – MSi	Boscoscuro	B-24	3	(Spain) Sergio García	All
(Spain) MT Helmets – MSi	Boscoscuro	B-24	79	(Japan) Ai Ogura	All
(Italy) Speed Up Racing (Note: This is the team name entered in the championship. Other team names used during the season are Sync Speed Up (rounds 1, 11–12, 19–20), Beta Tools Speed Up (rounds 2–4, 13, 15–18), Follardore Speed Up (rounds 5, 8), MB Conveyors Speed Up (rounds 6–7, 9, 14), and GT Trevisan Speed Up (round 10). Wildcard Mattia Pasini used the team name Team Ciatti Boscoscuro during rounds 7 and 11.)	Boscoscuro	B-24	21	(Spain) Alonso López	All
(Italy) Speed Up Racing	Boscoscuro	B-24	54	(Spain) Fermín Aldeguer	1–18, 20
(Italy) Speed Up Racing	Boscoscuro	B-24	67	(Italy) Alberto Surra	19
(Italy) Speed Up Racing	Boscoscuro	B-24	19	(Italy) Mattia Pasini	6–7, 11, 13
(Switzerland) Klint Forward Factory Team	Forward	F2	11	(Spain) Álex Escrig	1–4, 6–12, 14–20
(Switzerland) Klint Forward Factory Team	Forward	F2	9	(Spain) Jorge Navarro	5
(Switzerland) Klint Forward Factory Team	Forward	F2	40	(Spain) Unai Orradre	13
(Switzerland) Klint Forward Factory Team	Forward	F2	43	(Spain) Xavier Artigas	All
(Switzerland) Klint Forward Factory Team	Forward	F2	9	(Spain) Jorge Navarro	4, 6, 10–12
(Switzerland) Klint Forward Factory Team	Forward	F2	4	(Italy) Simone Corsi	20
(Spain) CFMoto Aspar Team (Note: This is the team name entered in the championship. Other team names used during the season are CFMoto Inde Aspar Team (rounds 2, 5–8, 10–18, 20), CFMoto Asterius Aspar Team (round 3), CFMoto Polarcube Aspar Team (round 9), and CFMoto RCB Aspar Team (round 19).)	Kalex	Moto2	28	(Spain) Izan Guevara	All
(Spain) CFMoto Aspar Team	Kalex	Moto2	96	(United Kingdom) Jake Dixon	All
(Belgium) Elf Marc VDS Racing Team	Kalex	Moto2	12	(Czech Republic) Filip Salač	1, 3–8, 10–20
(Belgium) Elf Marc VDS Racing Team	Kalex	Moto2	14	(Italy) Tony Arbolino	All
(Italy) Fantic Racing	Kalex	Moto2	20	(Andorra) Xavier Cardelús	1–8, 10–20
(Italy) Fantic Racing	Kalex	Moto2	31	(Spain) Roberto García	9
(Italy) Fantic Racing	Kalex	Moto2	31	(Spain) Roberto García	20
(Italy) Fantic Racing	Kalex	Moto2	44	(Spain) Arón Canet	All
(Japan) Idemitsu Honda Team Asia	Kalex	Moto2	34	(Indonesia) Mario Aji	1–4, 6–20
(Japan) Idemitsu Honda Team Asia	Kalex	Moto2	35	(Thailand) Somkiat Chantra	1–15, 18–20
(Italy) Italtrans Racing Team	Kalex	Moto2	10	(Brazil) Diogo Moreira	1–14, 16–20
(Italy) Italtrans Racing Team	Kalex	Moto2	71	(Italy) Dennis Foggia	1–14, 16–20
(Germany) Liqui Moly Husqvarna Intact GP	Kalex	Moto2	15	(South Africa) Darryn Binder	All
(Germany) Liqui Moly Husqvarna Intact GP	Kalex	Moto2	81	(Australia) Senna Agius	All
(United States) OnlyFans American Racing Team	Kalex	Moto2	16	(United States) Joe Roberts	1–17
(United States) OnlyFans American Racing Team	Kalex	Moto2	9	(Spain) Jorge Navarro	18–20
(United States) OnlyFans American Racing Team	Kalex	Moto2	24	(Spain) Marcos Ramírez	All
(Spain) Pertamina Mandalika Gas Up Team (Note: From round 8 onwards, the team used the team name Preicanos Racing Team.)	Kalex	Moto2	5	(Spain) Jaume Masià	All
(Spain) Pertamina Mandalika Gas Up Team	Kalex	Moto2	64	(Netherlands) Bo Bendsneyder	1–4, 8–13
(Spain) Pertamina Mandalika Gas Up Team	Kalex	Moto2	17	(Spain) Daniel Muñoz	5–7
(Spain) Pertamina Mandalika Gas Up Team	Kalex	Moto2	17	(Spain) Daniel Muñoz	14–16, 20
(Spain) Pertamina Mandalika Gas Up Team	Kalex	Moto2	29	(Australia) Harrison Voight	17–19
(Spain) Pertamina Mandalika Gas Up Team	Kalex	Moto2	17	(Spain) Daniel Muñoz	8–9, 12
(Italy) QJmotor Gresini Moto2 (Note: From round 17 onwards, the team used the team name Gresini Moto2.)	Kalex	Moto2	18	(Spain) Manuel González	All
(Italy) QJmotor Gresini Moto2	Kalex	Moto2	75	(Spain) Albert Arenas	All
(Italy) QJmotor Gresini Moto2	Kalex	Moto2	23	(Italy) Matteo Ferrari	4, 14
(Finland) Red Bull KTM Ajo	Kalex	Moto2	13	(Italy) Celestino Vietti	1–4, 6–17, 19–20
(Finland) Red Bull KTM Ajo	Kalex	Moto2	53	(Turkey) Deniz Öncü	1–7, 11–20
(Finland) Red Bull KTM Ajo	Kalex	Moto2	32	(Germany) Marcel Schrötter	8–10
(Netherlands) RW-Idrofoglia Racing GP	Kalex	Moto2	7	(Belgium) Barry Baltus	All
(Netherlands) RW-Idrofoglia Racing GP	Kalex	Moto2	84	(Netherlands) Zonta van den Goorbergh	All
(Malaysia) Petronas MIE Racing RW	Kalex	Moto2	55	(Malaysia) Helmi Azman	19
(Malaysia) Petronas MIE Racing RW	Kalex	Moto2	89	(Malaysia) Khairul Idham Pawi	19
(Italy) Yamaha VR46 Master Camp Team	Kalex	Moto2	22	(Japan) Ayumu Sasaki	1–2, 4–19
(Italy) Yamaha VR46 Master Camp Team	Kalex	Moto2	6	(Italy) Andrea Migno	20
(Italy) Yamaha VR46 Master Camp Team	Kalex	Moto2	52	(Spain) Jeremy Alcoba	1–19
(Italy) Yamaha VR46 Master Camp Team	Kalex	Moto2	62	(Italy) Stefano Manzi	20

Key
Regular rider
Replacement rider
Wildcard rider

All teams used series-specified Pirelli tyres and Triumph 765cc 3-cylinder engines.

=== Team changes ===
- Pons Racing left Grand Prix motorcycle racing as a whole, ending Sito Pons' 42-year presence in MotoGP as both a rider and team owner. The team has competed in the intermediate class since 2009, the final year of the 250cc class. They were replaced by MT Helmets – MSi, which entered Moto2 after having a Moto3 team since 2022. MT Helmets – MSi used Boscoscuro bikes, instead of the Kalex bikes used by Pons Racing.
- Aspar Team switched from GasGas to CFMoto branding.

=== Rider changes ===
- Filip Salač moved to Elf Marc VDS Racing Team from QJmotor Gresini Moto2, replacing Sam Lowes, who moved to the Superbike World Championship with the same team.
- Jaume Masià made his Moto2 debut with Pertamina Mandalika Gas Up Team, replacing Taiga Hada. Masià was the 2023 Moto3 champion.
- Diogo Moreira made his Moto2 debut with Italtrans Racing Team, replacing Joe Roberts. Moreira raced in the 2023 Moto3 World Championship.
- Celestino Vietti and Deniz Öncü raced for Red Bull KTM Ajo, replacing Pedro Acosta who moved up to MotoGP, and Albert Arenas. Vietti moved from Fantic Racing, while Öncü made his Moto2 debut, having raced in the 2023 Moto3 World Championship.
- Sergio García and Ai Ogura raced for the newly-formed MT Helmets – MSi. García moved from the now defunct Pons Racing, while Ogura moved from Idemitsu Honda Team Asia.
- Senna Agius made his full-time Moto2 debut with Liqui Moly Husqvarna Intact GP, replacing Lukas Tulovic who moved to MotoE with the same team. Agius previously served as a replacement rider in 2022 and 2023, and is also the 2023 Moto2 European Champion.
- Mario Aji made his Moto2 debut with Idemitsu Honda Team Asia, replacing Ai Ogura. Aji raced in the 2023 Moto3 World Championship with the same team.
- Manuel González and Albert Arenas raced for QJmotor Gresini Moto2, replacing Filip Salač and Jeremy Alcoba. González moved from Yamaha VR46 Master Camp Team, while Arenas moved from Red Bull KTM Ajo.
- Joe Roberts and Marcos Ramírez raced for OnlyFans American Racing Team. Roberts moved from Italtrans Racing Team and return to the team where he last raced for in 2020. Roberts' supposed teammate is Rory Skinner, who is contracted to race for the team until 2024. However, his contract was terminated and the team signed Ramírez. Ramírez was Skinner's teammate in the last 11 races of the 2023 season after replacing Skinner's original teammate Sean Dylan Kelly, who was sacked by the team midway through the season. Ramírez also raced for the team in a full season for the first time since 2021.
- Ayumu Sasaki and Jeremy Alcoba raced for Yamaha VR46 Master Camp Team, replacing Kohta Nozane and Manuel González. Sasaki made his Moto2 debut, having been the 2023 Moto3 runner-up, while Alcoba moved from QJmotor Gresini Moto2.
- Xavier Artigas made his Moto2 debut with Forward Team. Artigas raced in the 2023 Moto3 World Championship.
- Xavier Cardelús and Arón Canet raced for Fantic Racing, replacing Celestino Vietti and Mattia Casadei. Cardelús, who is the 2023 Moto2 European runner-up, returned to Moto2 after having last raced full-time in the class in 2019, while Canet moved from the now defunct Pons Racing.

==== Mid-season changes ====
- Filip Salač missed the Portuguese round after having arm pump surgery. He also missed the German round due to an injury sustained at the previous Dutch round. He was not replaced for both races.
- Ayumu Sasaki missed the Americas round after having double arm pump surgery. He was not replaced.
- Álex Escrig missed the French round due to left hand and shoulder pain sustained from a training accident. He was replaced by Jorge Navarro. Escrig also missed the San Marino round due to an injury and was replaced by Unai Orradre.
- Mario Aji missed the French round as he recovered from arm pump surgery. He was not replaced.
- Celestino Vietti missed the French round after failing a physical test due to a broken collarbone in the Jerez test. He was not replaced.
- Bo Bendsneyder missed the French, Catalan, and Italian rounds after suffering a fractured collarbone in the Spanish race. He was replaced in these races by Daniel Muñoz. Bendsneyder eventually resigned and left the team after the San Marino round and was replaced for the rest of the season by Muñoz. However, Muñoz missed the Australian, Thailand, and Malaysian rounds due to an injury and was replaced for all races by Harrison Voight.
- Deniz Öncü missed the Dutch, German, and British rounds after having surgery on his left hand that was fractured during training. He was replaced for all races by Marcel Schrötter.
- Xavier Cardelús missed the German round after injuring his right foot at the previous Dutch round. He was replaced by Roberto García.
- Italtrans Racing teammates Diogo Moreira and Dennis Foggia both missed the Indonesian round: Moreira due to severe abdominal pain and Foggia due to being diagnosed with a purulent infection of the left buccal mucosa. They were not replaced.
- Somkiat Chantra missed the Japanese and Australian rounds due to a right leg injury sustained at the Indonesian round. He was not replaced for both races.
- Joe Roberts missed the final three races of the season due to an injury sustained at the Australian round. He was replaced for all races by Jorge Navarro.
- Fermín Aldeguer missed the Malaysian round after fracturing his left hand in the previous Thailand race. He was replaced by Alberto Surra.
- Yamaha VR46 Master Camp teammates Ayumu Sasaki and Jeremy Alcoba both missed the Solidarity round, with both riders suffering several fractures from the previous Malaysian round. They were replaced by Andrea Migno and Stefano Manzi.

== Rule changes ==
The Friday morning first practice session was designated as free practice and was not timed for qualifying.

== Calendar ==
The following Grands Prix took place in 2024:

Round	Date	Grand Prix	Circuit
1	10 March	Qatar Airways Grand Prix of Qatar	Lusail International Circuit, Lusail
2	24 March	Grande Prémio Tissot de Portugal	Algarve International Circuit, Portimão
3	14 April	(United States) Red Bull Grand Prix of the Americas	Circuit of the Americas, Austin
4	28 April	(Spain) Gran Premio Estrella Galicia 0,0 de España	Circuito de Jerez, Jerez de la Frontera
5	12 May	Michelin Grand Prix de France	Bugatti Circuit, Le Mans
6	26 May	(Catalonia) Gran Premi Monster Energy de Catalunya	Circuit de Barcelona-Catalunya, Montmeló
7	2 June	(Italy) Gran Premio d'Italia Brembo	Mugello Circuit, Scarperia e San Piero
8	30 June	(Netherlands) Motul TT Assen	TT Circuit Assen, Assen
9	7 July	(Germany) Liqui Moly Motorrad Grand Prix Deutschland	Sachsenring, Hohenstein-Ernstthal
10	4 August	(United Kingdom) Monster Energy British Grand Prix	Silverstone Circuit, Silverstone
11	18 August	(Austria) Motorrad Grand Prix von Österreich	Red Bull Ring, Spielberg
12	1 September	(Aragon) Gran Premio GoPro de Aragón	MotorLand Aragón, Alcañiz
13	8 September	Gran Premio Red Bull di San Marino e della Riviera di Rimini	Misano World Circuit, Misano Adriatico
14	22 September	Gran Premio Pramac dell'Emilia-Romagna	Misano World Circuit, Misano Adriatico
15	29 September	Pertamina Grand Prix of Indonesia	Mandalika International Street Circuit, Mandalika
16	6 October	Motul Grand Prix of Japan	Motegi Circuit, Motegi
17	20 October	(Australia) Qatar Airways Australian Motorcycle Grand Prix	Phillip Island Grand Prix Circuit, Phillip Island
18	27 October	PT Grand Prix of Thailand	Buriram International Circuit, Buriram
19	3 November	Petronas Grand Prix of Malaysia	Sepang International Circuit, Sepang
20	17 November	Motul Solidarity Grand Prix of Barcelona	Circuit de Barcelona-Catalunya, Montmeló
Cancelled Grands Prix
–	~~7 April~~	(Argentina) Argentine Republic motorcycle Grand Prix	Autódromo Termas de Río Hondo, Termas de Río Hondo
–	~~16 June~~; ~~22 September~~	Kazakhstan motorcycle Grand Prix	Sokol International Racetrack, Almaty
–	~~22 September~~	(India) Indian motorcycle Grand Prix	Buddh International Circuit, Greater Noida
–	~~17 November~~	Valencian Community motorcycle Grand Prix	Circuit Ricardo Tormo, Valencia

=== Grand Prix locations ===
Location of non-European Grands Prix in 2024.
(scheduled Grand Prix: cancelled Grand Prix)
Location of European Grands Prix in 2024.
(scheduled Grand Prix: cancelled Grand Prix)

=== Calendar changes ===
- The Qatar Grand Prix returned as the season opener after being the penultimate round in 2023.
- The Kazakhstan Grand Prix is set to make its debut this season after its cancellation in 2023 due to homologation works at the circuit along with global operational challenges. With the introduction of this Grand Prix, the German Grand Prix was returned to its traditional calendar slot in early July, after the Dutch TT and before the season's summer break.
- The Aragon Grand Prix returned this season after not being held in 2023.
- The Argentine Grand Prix was cancelled on 31 January, due to "current circumstances" in the country's on-going economic crisis. The event was not replaced.
- The Kazakhstan Grand Prix was "postponed until later in the season" on 3 May, due to the on-going Central Asian flooding. It was announced on 29 May that it will be held on 22 September, the date which the Indian Grand Prix is scheduled to be held. It was also announced on the same day the Grand Prix of India will not be held in 2024 and will be postponed to March 2025. On 15 July, it was announced that the Kazakhstan Grand Prix would not take place, and its date would be replaced by a second round at Misano.
- The Valencian Grand Prix which was initially scheduled to be held as the season finale on 17 November was cancelled due to the October 2024 Spanish floods. On 5 November, it was announced that a second Grand Prix at Barcelona would host the season finale, with the Grand Prix name being the Solidarity Grand Prix.

== Results and standings ==
=== Grands Prix ===
Round	Grand Prix	Pole position	Fastest lap	Winning rider	Winning team	Winning constructor	Report
1	Qatar motorcycle Grand Prix	(Spain) Arón Canet	(Spain) Arón Canet	(Spain) Alonso López	(Italy) Sync Speed Up	(Italy) Boscoscuro	Report
2	(Portugal) Portuguese motorcycle Grand Prix	(Spain) Manuel González	(Spain) Fermín Aldeguer	(Spain) Arón Canet	(Italy) Fantic Racing	(Germany) Kalex	Report
3	(United States) Motorcycle Grand Prix of the Americas	(Spain) Arón Canet	(Spain) Alonso López	(Spain) Sergio García	(Spain) MT Helmets – MSi	(Italy) Boscoscuro	Report
4	(Spain) Spanish motorcycle Grand Prix	(Spain) Fermín Aldeguer	(United States) Joe Roberts	(Spain) Fermín Aldeguer	(Italy) Beta Tools Speed Up	(Italy) Boscoscuro	Report
5	(France) French motorcycle Grand Prix	(Spain) Arón Canet	(Spain) Arón Canet	(Spain) Sergio García	(Spain) MT Helmets – MSi	(Italy) Boscoscuro	Report
6	(Catalonia) Catalan motorcycle Grand Prix	(Spain) Sergio García	(Spain) Fermín Aldeguer	(Japan) Ai Ogura	(Spain) MT Helmets – MSi	(Italy) Boscoscuro	Report
7	(Italy) Italian motorcycle Grand Prix	(United States) Joe Roberts	(Spain) Arón Canet	(United States) Joe Roberts	(United States) OnlyFans American Racing Team	(Germany) Kalex	Report
8	(Netherlands) Dutch TT	(Spain) Fermín Aldeguer	(Spain) Sergio García	(Japan) Ai Ogura	(Spain) MT Helmets – MSi	(Italy) Boscoscuro	Report
9	(Germany) German motorcycle Grand Prix	(Italy) Celestino Vietti	(Italy) Tony Arbolino	(Spain) Fermín Aldeguer	(Italy) Beta Tools Speed Up	(Italy) Boscoscuro	Report
10	(United Kingdom) British motorcycle Grand Prix	(Japan) Ai Ogura	(Spain) Arón Canet	(United Kingdom) Jake Dixon	(Spain) CFMoto Inde Aspar Team	(Germany) Kalex	Report
11	(Austria) Austrian motorcycle Grand Prix	(Italy) Celestino Vietti	(Italy) Celestino Vietti	(Italy) Celestino Vietti	(Finland) Red Bull KTM Ajo	(Germany) Kalex	Report
12	Aragon motorcycle Grand Prix	(United Kingdom) Jake Dixon	(United Kingdom) Jake Dixon	(United Kingdom) Jake Dixon	(Spain) CFMoto Inde Aspar Team	(Germany) Kalex	Report
13	San Marino and Rimini Riviera motorcycle Grand Prix	(Italy) Tony Arbolino	(Spain) Alonso López	(Japan) Ai Ogura	(Spain) MT Helmets – MSi	(Italy) Boscoscuro	Report
14	(Emilia-Romagna) Emilia Romagna motorcycle Grand Prix	(Spain) Arón Canet	(Italy) Celestino Vietti	(Italy) Celestino Vietti	(Finland) Red Bull KTM Ajo	(Germany) Kalex	Report
15	(Indonesia) Indonesian motorcycle Grand Prix	(Spain) Arón Canet	(Spain) Arón Canet	(Spain) Arón Canet	(Italy) Fantic Racing	(Germany) Kalex	Report
16	(Japan) Japanese motorcycle Grand Prix	(United Kingdom) Jake Dixon	(Spain) Manuel González	(Spain) Manuel González	(Italy) QJmotor Gresini Moto2	(Germany) Kalex	Report
17	(Australia) Australian motorcycle Grand Prix	(Spain) Fermín Aldeguer	(Spain) Arón Canet	(Spain) Fermín Aldeguer	(Italy) Beta Tools Speed Up	(Italy) Boscoscuro	Report
18	Thailand motorcycle Grand Prix	(Japan) Ai Ogura	(Japan) Ai Ogura	(Spain) Arón Canet	(Italy) Fantic Racing	(Germany) Kalex	Report
19	(Malaysia) Malaysian motorcycle Grand Prix	(Spain) Jorge Navarro	(Italy) Celestino Vietti	(Italy) Celestino Vietti	(Finland) Red Bull KTM Ajo	(Germany) Kalex	Report
20	Solidarity motorcycle Grand Prix	(Spain) Arón Canet	(Spain) Sergio García	(Spain) Arón Canet	(Italy) Fantic Racing	(Germany) Kalex	Report

=== Riders' standings ===
Scoring system

Points were awarded to the top fifteen finishers. A rider had to finish the race to earn points.

Position	1st	2nd	3rd	4th	5th	6th	7th	8th	9th	10th	11th	12th	13th	14th	15th
Points	25	20	16	13	11	10	9	8	7	6	5	4	3	2	1

Pos.	Rider	Bike	Team	QAT (Qatar)	POR (Portugal)	AME (United States)	SPA (Spain)	FRA (France)	CAT (Catalonia)	ITA (Italy)	NED (Netherlands)	GER (Germany)	GBR (United Kingdom)	AUT (Austria)	ARA (Aragon)	RSM (San Marino)	EMI (Emilia-Romagna)	INA (Indonesia)	JPN (Japan)	AUS (Australia)	THA (Thailand)	MAL (Malaysia)	SLD	Pts
1	(Japan) Ai Ogura	Boscoscuro	MT Helmets – MSi	4	5	7	6	2	1	5	1	3	14^{P}	DNS	8	1	4	2	2	4	2^{P F}	Ret	4	274
2	(Spain) Arón Canet	Kalex	Fantic Racing	10^{P F}	1	9^{P}	DNS	6^{P F}	Ret	6^{F}	Ret	Ret	2^{F}	4	Ret	2	2^{P}	1^{P F}	16	2^{F}	1	8	1^{P}	234
3	(Spain) Manuel González	Kalex	QJmotor Gresini Moto2	5	3^{P}	13	3	24	22	2	9	12	5	13	5	4	11	8	1^{F}	6	9	11	2	195
4	(Spain) Sergio García	Boscoscuro	MT Helmets – MSi	3	6	1	4	1	2^{P}	4	3^{F}	7	4	14	Ret	12	Ret	Ret	14	9	12	14	6^{F}	191
5	(Spain) Fermín Aldeguer	Boscoscuro	Speed Up Racing	16	4^{F}	3	1^{P}	7	Ret^{F}	Ret	2^{P}	1	12	20	Ret	6	5	4	12	1^{P}	Ret		9	182
6	(Spain) Alonso López	Boscoscuro	Speed Up Racing	1	25	4^{F}	Ret	3	7	3	8	10	9	2	4	29^{F}	9	3	9	Ret	11	13	8	179
7	(Italy) Celestino Vietti	Kalex	Red Bull KTM Ajo	9	7	10	9		Ret	7	10	5^{P}	3	1^{P F}	10	Ret	1^{F}	12	7	DNS		1^{F}	Ret	165
8	(United Kingdom) Jake Dixon	Kalex	CFMoto Aspar Team	DNS	DNS	23	Ret	17	3	12	4	2	1	3	1^{P F}	5	Ret	22	13^{P}	Ret	7	4	Ret	155
9	(United States) Joe Roberts	Kalex	OnlyFans American Racing Team	7	2	2	2^{F}	4	8	1^{P}	DNS	8	Ret	9	Ret	13	6	6	27	DNS				153
10	(Italy) Tony Arbolino	Kalex	Elf Marc VDS Racing Team	20	12	11	7	8	9	16	6	9^{F}	Ret	5	2	3^{P}	3	7	11	8	Ret	5	13	149
11	(Spain) Marcos Ramírez	Kalex	OnlyFans American Racing Team	6	9	5	Ret	15	DSQ	10	7	18	15	6	7	15	8	10	19	10	3	6	11	116
12	(Thailand) Somkiat Chantra	Kalex	Idemitsu Honda Team Asia	11	10	21	10	5	Ret	9	5	6	Ret	8	6	14	14	Ret			4	9	10	104
13	(Brazil) Diogo Moreira	Kalex	Italtrans Racing Team	22	18	14	Ret	26	Ret	11	16	4	Ret	16	17	8	DNS		8	5	5	10	3	80
14	(Spain) Albert Arenas	Kalex	QJmotor Gresini Moto2	8	8	12	5	9	6	19	Ret	21	8	17	18	9	17	14	22	13	8	12	DSQ	80
15	(Spain) Jeremy Alcoba	Kalex	Yamaha VR46 Master Camp Team	12	11	8	8	11	4	Ret	13	14	7	24	21	17	15	13	4	11	Ret	Ret		79
16	(Czech Republic) Filip Salač	Kalex	Elf Marc VDS Racing Team	21		15	11	12	12	Ret	DNS		Ret	10	11	7	10	15	3	14	14	15	5	73
17	(Spain) Izan Guevara	Kalex	CFMoto Aspar Team	Ret	22	20	12	10	Ret	8	19	13	20	12	Ret	21	13	DSQ	10	16	6	3	7	69
18	(Australia) Senna Agius	Kalex	Liqui Moly Husqvarna Intact GP	17	14	17	Ret	13	5	17	11	11	10	15	16	11	7	Ret	20	3	Ret	Ret	12	67
19	(South Africa) Darryn Binder	Kalex	Liqui Moly Husqvarna Intact GP	18	15	27	19	14	14	Ret	15	25	6	7	9	10	16	5	15	12	Ret	Ret	15	55
20	(Turkey) Deniz Öncü	Kalex	Red Bull KTM Ajo	15	20	22	14	18	19	13				11	3	19	Ret	9	17	21	10	7	21	49
21	(Belgium) Barry Baltus	Kalex	RW-Idrofoglia Racing GP	2	13	16	Ret	Ret	21	18	17	20	16	Ret	13	18	18	11	18	7	Ret	18	17	40
22	(Netherlands) Zonta van den Goorbergh	Kalex	RW-Idrofoglia Racing GP	13	19	Ret	13	25	11	14	Ret	Ret	11	18	14	23	Ret	17	5	Ret	19	Ret	Ret	31
23	(Spain) Jorge Navarro	Forward	Klint Forward Factory Team				18	20	10				18	Ret	23									27
23	(Spain) Jorge Navarro	Kalex	OnlyFans American Racing Team																		15	2^{P}	Ret	27
24	(Italy) Dennis Foggia	Kalex	Italtrans Racing Team	19	17	6	Ret	19	Ret	20	12	16	19	Ret	Ret	22	12		26	Ret	18	19	24	18
25	(Spain) Xavier Artigas	Forward	Klint Forward Factory Team	27	DNS	25	20	Ret	20	25	23	23	23	25	Ret	26	22	20	6	19	21	22	23	10
26	(Japan) Ayumu Sasaki	Kalex	Yamaha VR46 Master Camp Team	Ret	Ret		DNS	22	Ret	Ret	Ret	24	21	21	12	16	20	16	21	Ret	13	WD		7
27	(Netherlands) Bo Bendsneyder	Kalex	Pertamina Mandalika Gas Up Team	14	16	18	Ret				14	Ret	13	22	Ret	20								7
28	(Spain) Jaume Masià	Kalex	Pertamina Mandalika Gas Up Team	25	21	19	Ret	16	13	21	24	15	Ret	19	19	24	Ret	Ret	24	Ret	17	16	14	6
29	(Indonesia) Mario Aji	Kalex	Idemitsu Honda Team Asia	24	23	Ret	16		15	15	22	Ret	Ret	Ret	15	25	19	18	NC	15	16	17	16	4
30	(Italy) Matteo Ferrari	Kalex	QJmotor Gresini Moto2				15										Ret							1
31	(Andorra) Xavier Cardelús	Kalex	Fantic Racing	23	Ret	26	17	21	16	23	DNS		Ret	26	22	27	23	Ret	25	20	20	21	22	0
32	(Germany) Marcel Schrötter	Kalex	Red Bull KTM Ajo								18	17	17											0
33	(Spain) Álex Escrig	Forward	Klint Forward Factory Team	26	24	24	Ret		18	24	21	22	22	Ret	24		24	19	23	17	Ret	20	19	0
34	(Italy) Mattia Pasini	Boscoscuro	Team Ciatti Speed Up						17	26				23		Ret								0
35	(Australia) Harrison Voight	Kalex	Pertamina Mandalika Gas Up Team																	18	22	Ret		0
36	(Spain) Daniel Muñoz	Kalex	Pertamina Mandalika Gas Up Team					23	Ret	22	20	19			20		21	21	DNS				18	0
37	(Italy) Stefano Manzi	Kalex	Yamaha VR46 Master Camp Team																				20	0
38	(Malaysia) Helmi Azman	Kalex	Petronas MIE Racing RW																			23		0
39	(Italy) Andrea Migno	Kalex	Yamaha VR46 Master Camp Team																				25	0
40	(Italy) Simone Corsi	Forward	Klint Forward Factory Team																				26	0
41	(Spain) Unai Orradre	Forward	Klint Forward Factory Team													28								0
	(Spain) Roberto García	Kalex	Fantic Racing									Ret											Ret	0
	(Italy) Alberto Surra	Boscoscuro	Speed Up Racing																			Ret		0
	(Malaysia) Khairul Idham Pawi	Kalex	Petronas MIE Racing RW																			DNS		0
Pos.	Rider	Bike	Team	QAT (Qatar)	POR (Portugal)	AME (United States)	SPA (Spain)	FRA (France)	CAT (Catalonia)	ITA (Italy)	NED (Netherlands)	GER (Germany)	GBR (United Kingdom)	AUT (Austria)	ARA (Aragon)	RSM (San Marino)	EMI (Emilia-Romagna)	INA (Indonesia)	JPN (Japan)	AUS (Australia)	THA (Thailand)	MAL (Malaysia)	SLD	Pts

Race key
Colour	Result
Gold	Winner
Silver	2nd place
Bronze	3rd place
Green	Points finish
Blue	Non-points finish
Blue	Non-classified finish (NC)
Purple	Retired (Ret)
Red	Did not qualify (DNQ)
Black	Disqualified (DSQ)
White	Did not start (DNS)
White	Withdrew (WD)
White	Race cancelled (C)
Blank	Did not practice (DNP)
Blank	Excluded (EX)
Blank	Did not arrive (DNA)
Blank	Did not enter (empty cell)
Annotation	Meaning
P	Pole position
F	Fastest lap
Rider key
Colour	Meaning
Light blue	Rookie rider

=== Constructors' standings ===
Each constructor was awarded the same number of points as their best placed rider in each race.

Pos.	Constructor	QAT (Qatar)	POR (Portugal)	AME (United States)	SPA (Spain)	FRA (France)	CAT (Catalonia)	ITA (Italy)	NED (Netherlands)	GER (Germany)	GBR (United Kingdom)	AUT (Austria)	ARA (Aragon)	RSM (San Marino)	EMI (Emilia-Romagna)	INA (Indonesia)	JPN (Japan)	AUS (Australia)	THA (Thailand)	MAL (Malaysia)	SLD	Pts
1	(Germany) Kalex	2	1	2	2	4	3	1	4	2	1	1	1	2	1	1	1	2	1	1	1	437
2	(Italy) Boscoscuro	1	4	1	1	1	1	3	1	1	4	2	4	1	4	2	2	1	2	13	4	389
3	(Switzerland) Forward	26	24	24	18	20	10	24	21	22	18	25	24	24	22	19	6	17	21	20	20	16
Pos.	Constructor	QAT (Qatar)	POR (Portugal)	AME (United States)	SPA (Spain)	FRA (France)	CAT (Catalonia)	ITA (Italy)	NED (Netherlands)	GER (Germany)	GBR (United Kingdom)	AUT (Austria)	ARA (Aragon)	RSM (San Marino)	EMI (Emilia-Romagna)	INA (Indonesia)	JPN (Japan)	AUS (Australia)	THA (Thailand)	MAL (Malaysia)	SLD	Pts

=== Teams' standings ===
The teams' standings were based on results obtained by regular and substitute riders; wild-card entries were ineligible.

Pos.	Team	Bike No.	QAT (Qatar)	POR (Portugal)	AME (United States)	SPA (Spain)	FRA (France)	CAT (Catalonia)	ITA (Italy)	NED (Netherlands)	GER (Germany)	GBR (United Kingdom)	AUT (Austria)	ARA (Aragon)	RSM (San Marino)	EMI (Emilia-Romagna)	INA (Indonesia)	JPN (Japan)	AUS (Australia)	THA (Thailand)	MAL (Malaysia)	SLD	Pts
1	(Spain) MT Helmets – MSi	3	3	6	1	4	1	2^{P}	4	3^{F}	7	4	14	Ret	12	Ret	Ret	12	9	12	14	6^{F}	465
1	(Spain) MT Helmets – MSi	79	4	5	7	6	2	1	5	1	3	14^{P}	DNS	8	1	4	2	2	4	2^{P F}	Ret	4	465
2	(Italy) Speed Up Racing	21	1	25	4^{F}	Ret	3	7	3	8	10	9	2	4	29^{F}	9	3	9	Ret	11	13	8	361
2	(Italy) Speed Up Racing	54	16	4^{F}	3	1^{P}	7	Ret^{F}	Ret	2^{P}	1	12	20	Ret	6	5	4	12	1^{P}	Ret		9	361
2	(Italy) Speed Up Racing	67																			Ret		361
3	(United States) OnlyFans American Racing Team	9																		15	2^{P}	Ret	290
3	(United States) OnlyFans American Racing Team	16	7	2	2	2^{F}	4	8	1^{P}	DNS	8	Ret	9	Ret	13	6	6	27	DNS				290
3	(United States) OnlyFans American Racing Team	24	6	9	5	Ret	15	DSQ	10	7	18	15	6	7	15	8	10	19	10	3	6	11	290
4	(Italy) QJMotor Gresini Moto2	18	5	3^{P}	13	3	24	22	2	9	13	5	13	5	4	11	8	1^{F}	6	9	11	2	275
4	(Italy) QJMotor Gresini Moto2	75	8	8	12	5	9	6	19	Ret	21	8	17	18	9	17	14	22	13	8	12	DSQ	275
5	(Italy) Fantic Racing	20	23	Ret	26	17	21	16	23	DNS		Ret	26	22	27	23	Ret	25	20	20	21	22	234
5	(Italy) Fantic Racing	31									Ret												234
5	(Italy) Fantic Racing	44	10^{P F}	1	9^{P}	DNS	6^{P F}	Ret	6^{F}	Ret	Ret	2^{F}	4	Ret	2	2^{P}	1^{P F}	16	2^{F}	1	8	1^{P}	234
6	(Spain) CFMoto Aspar Team	28	Ret	22	20	12	10	Ret	8	19	12	20	12	Ret	21	13	DSQ	10	16	6	3	7	224
6	(Spain) CFMoto Aspar Team	96	DNS	DNS	23	Ret	17	3	12	4	2	1	3	1^{P F}	5	Ret	22	13^{P}	Ret	4	4	Ret	224
7	(Belgium) Elf Marc VDS Racing Team	12	21		15	11	12	12	Ret	DNS		Ret	10	11	7	10	15	3	14	14	15	5	222
7	(Belgium) Elf Marc VDS Racing Team	14	20	12	11	7	8	9	16	6	9^{F}	Ret	5	2	3^{P}	3	7	11	8	Ret	5	13	222
8	(Finland) Red Bull KTM Ajo	13	9	7	10	9		Ret	7	10	5^{P}	3	1^{P F}	10	Ret	1^{F}	12	7	DNS		1^{F}	Ret	214
8	(Finland) Red Bull KTM Ajo	32								18	17	17											214
8	(Finland) Red Bull KTM Ajo	53	15	20	22	14	18	19	13				11	3	19	Ret	9	17	21	10	7	21	214
9	(Germany) Liqui Moly Husqvarna Intact GP	15	18	15	27	19	14	14	Ret	15	25	6	7	9	10	16	5	15	12	Ret	Ret	15	122
9	(Germany) Liqui Moly Husqvarna Intact GP	81	17	14	17	Ret	13	5	17	11	11	10	15	16	11	7	Ret	20	3	Ret	Ret	12	122
10	(Japan) Idemitsu Honda Team Asia	34	24	23	Ret	16	DNS	15	15	22	Ret	Ret	Ret	15	25	21	18	NC	15	16	17	16	108
10	(Japan) Idemitsu Honda Team Asia	35	11	10	21	10	5	Ret	9	5	6	Ret	8	6	14	14	Ret			4	9	10	108
11	(Italy) Italtrans Racing Team	10	22	18	14	Ret	26	Ret	11	16	4	Ret	16	17	8	DNS		8	5	5	10	3	98
11	(Italy) Italtrans Racing Team	71	19	17	6	Ret	19	Ret	20	12	16	19	Ret	Ret	22	12		26	Ret	18	19	24	98
12	(Italy) Yamaha VR46 Master Camp Team	6																				25	86
12	(Italy) Yamaha VR46 Master Camp Team	22	Ret	Ret		DNS	22	Ret	Ret	Ret	24	21	21	12	16	19	16	21	Ret	13	WD		86
12	(Italy) Yamaha VR46 Master Camp Team	52	12	11	8	8	11	4	Ret	13	14	7	24	21	17	15	13	4	11	Ret	Ret		86
12	(Italy) Yamaha VR46 Master Camp Team	62																				20	86
13	(Netherlands) RW-Idrofoglia Racing GP	7	2	13	16	Ret	Ret	21	18	17	20	16	Ret	13	18	18	11	18	7	Ret	18	17	71
13	(Netherlands) RW-Idrofoglia Racing GP	84	13	19	Ret	13	25	11	14	Ret	Ret	11	18	14	23	Ret	17	5	Ret	19	Ret	Ret	71
14	(Indonesia) Pertamina Mandalika Gas Up Team	5	25	21	19	Ret	16	13	21	24	15	Ret	19	19	24	Ret	Ret	24	Ret	17	16	14	13
14	(Indonesia) Pertamina Mandalika Gas Up Team	17					23	Ret	22							20	21	DNS				18	13
14	(Indonesia) Pertamina Mandalika Gas Up Team	29																	18	22	Ret		13
14	(Indonesia) Pertamina Mandalika Gas Up Team	64	14	16	18	Ret				14	Ret	13	22	Ret	20								13
15	(Switzerland) Klint Forward Factory Team	9					20																10
15	(Switzerland) Klint Forward Factory Team	11	Ret	24	24	Ret		19	24	21	22	22	Ret	24		24	19	23	17	Ret	20	19	10
15	(Switzerland) Klint Forward Factory Team	40													28								10
15	(Switzerland) Klint Forward Factory Team	43	27	DNS	25	20	Ret	20	25	23	23	23	25	Ret	26	22	20	6	19	21	22	23	10
Pos.	Team	Bike No.	QAT (Qatar)	POR (Portugal)	AME (United States)	SPA (Spain)	FRA (France)	CAT (Catalonia)	ITA (Italy)	NED (Netherlands)	GER (Germany)	GBR (United Kingdom)	AUT (Austria)	ARA (Aragon)	RSM (San Marino)	EMI (Emilia-Romagna)	INA (Indonesia)	JPN (Japan)	AUS (Australia)	THA (Thailand)	MAL (Malaysia)	SLD	Pts
