= Sergio García (motorcyclist) =

Spanish motorcycle racer

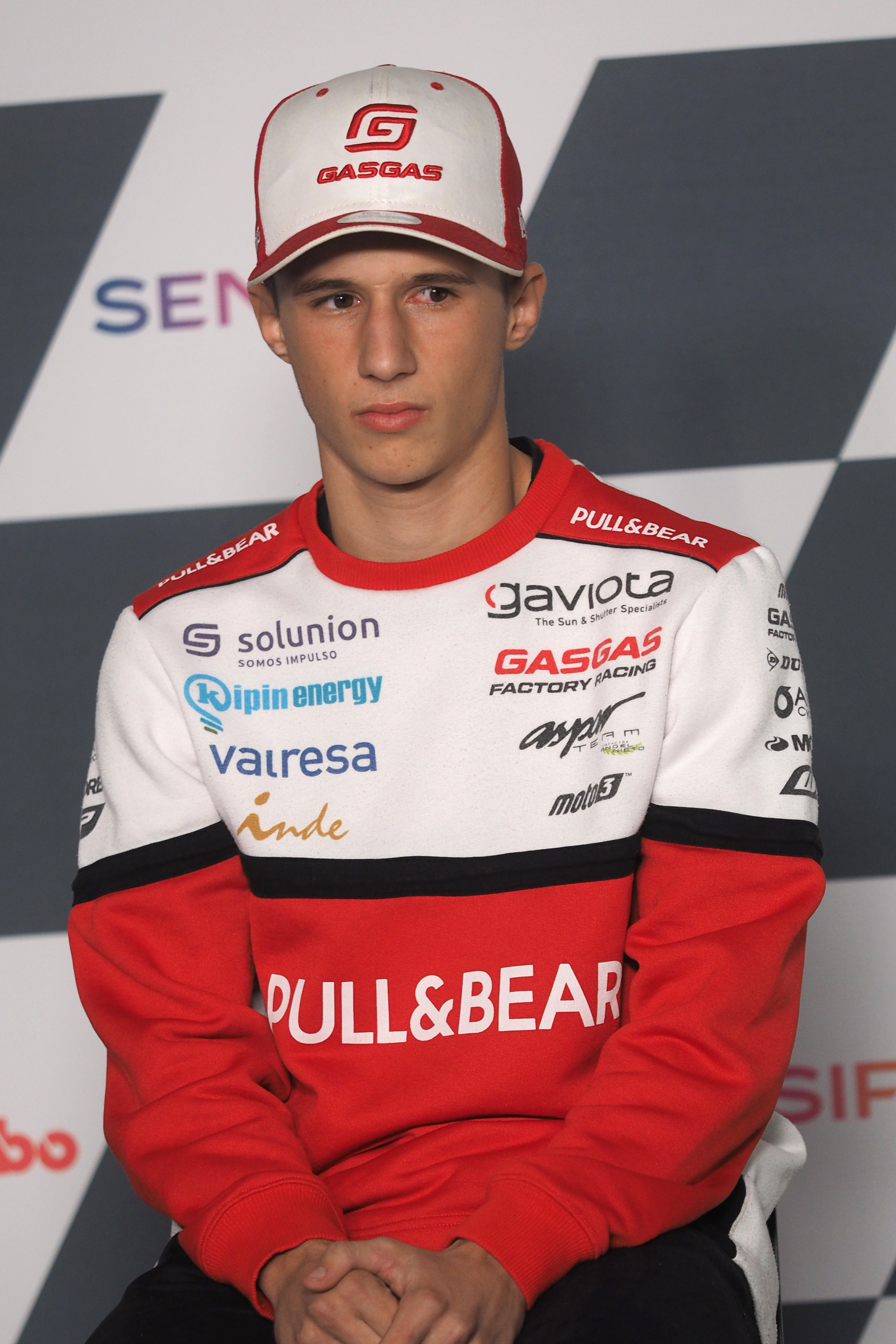
- García at the 2021 Algarve Grand Prix
- Nationality: Spanish
- Born: 22 March 2003 (age 23); Burriana, Spain
- Current team: Italjet Gresini Moto2
- Bike number: 3
Motorcycle racing career statistics
Moto2 World Championship
Active years	2023–
Manufacturers	Kalex (2023, 2025–); Boscoscuro (2024–2025)
2025 championship position	28th (3 pts)
Starts / Wins / Podiums / Poles / F. laps / Points; 64 / 2 / 5 / 1 / 2 / 289
Moto3 World Championship
Active years	2019–2022
Manufacturers	Honda (2019–2020); GasGas (2021–2022)
Championships	0
2022 championship position	2nd (257 pts)
Starts / Wins / Podiums / Poles / F. laps / Points; 68 / 7 / 20 / 2 / 4 / 611
Superbike World Championship
Active years	2025
Manufacturers	Honda
2025 championship position	24th (6 pts)
Starts / Wins / Podiums / Poles / F. laps / Points; 3 / 0 / 0 / 0 / 0 / 6

Sergio García Dols (born 22 March 2003) is a Spanish motorcycle rider who currently competes for Italjet Gresini Moto2 in the 2026 Moto2 World Championship. He comes from Burriana in the Valencian Community. He became the runner up in the 2022 Moto3 World Championship.

== Career ==
=== Early career ===
At national level, García won the 2015 CEV Challenge 80 and the 2016 CEV Pre Moto3.

García is member of the Estrella Galicia Junior Academy since 2016.

García finished runner-up to Raúl Fernández in the 2018 FIM CEV Moto3 Junior World Championship.

=== Moto3 World Championship ===
==== Estrella Galicia 0,0 (2019–2020) ====
García graduated to Moto3 Grand Prix racing the following season.

==== Aspar Team (2021–2022) ====
From 2021 to 2022, García competed for Aspar Team Moto3 with his teammate Izan Guevara.

=== Moto2 World Championship ===
==== Pons Wegow Los40 (2023) ====
In 2023, García graduated to Moto2 World Championship riding for Pons Wegow Los40.

==== MT Helmets – MSi (2024-2025) ====
García and Ai Ogura would team up in the MT Helmets - MSi Moto2 team that acquired Pons Racing starting 2024 season.

==== Liqui Moly Dynavolt Intact GP (2025) ====
Senna Agius missed the Hungarian round due to injury at the Austrian round. García replaced him at the Hungarian.

==== Italjet Gresini Moto2 (2025–) ====
In August 2025, the Gresini Racing announced that García will join their Moto2 team for 2026. He will race alongside Alonso López.

=== Superbike World Championship ===
==== Honda HRC (2025) ====
García made his WSBK debut after receiving a call from the Honda HRC team for testing at the Aragon Test, replacing Iker Lecuona who is still recovering from injury.

In 29 August, Honda HRC confirmed that García would compete alongside Xavi Vierge in the ninth round of the 2025 WorldSBK season at the French round. He replaced for Iker Lecuona, who was still recovering from surgery on his left arm. Lecuona previously underwent surgery on his left arm, which forced him to be sidelined for a while.

== Career statistics ==
=== FIM CEV Moto3 Junior World Championship ===
==== Races by year ====
(key) (Races in bold indicate pole position, races in italics indicate fastest lap)

Year	Bike	1	2	3	4	5	6	7	8	9	10	11	12	Pos	Pts
2017	Honda	ALB; 7	LMS; 4	CAT1; 3	CAT2; 1	VAL1; Ret	VAL2; 7	EST; 8	JER1; Ret	JER1; DNS	ARA; 20	VAL1; 7	VAL2; 6	7th	99
2018	Honda	EST; Ret	VAL1; 1	VAL2; DNS	LMS	CAT1; 1	CAT2; 5	ARA; 6	**JER1**; Ret	**JER2**; 1	ALB; Ret	VAL1; 5	VAL2; 1	2nd	132

=== Grand Prix motorcycle racing ===
==== By season ====
Season	Class	Motorcycle	Team	Race	Win	Podium	Pole	FLap	Pts	Plcd
2019	Moto3	Honda	Estrella Galicia 0,0	17	1	2	0	0	76	15th
2020	Moto3	Honda	Estrella Galicia 0,0	15	0	2	0	3	90	9th
2021	Moto3	GasGas	GasGas Aspar Team	16	3	6	1	1	188	**3rd**
2022	Moto3	GasGas	GasGas Aspar Team	20	3	10	1	0	257	**2nd**
2023	Moto2	Kalex	Pons Wegow Los40	20	0	0	0	0	84	15th
2024	Moto2	Boscoscuro	MT Helmets – MSi	20	2	5	1	2	191	4th
2025	Moto2	Boscoscuro	QJMotor – Frinsa – MSi	5	0	0	0	0	3	28th
2025	Moto2	Kalex	Liqui Moly Dynavolt Intact GP	1	0	0	0	0	3	28th
2025	Moto2	Kalex	Italjet Gresini Moto2	2	0	0	0	0	3	28th
2026	Moto2	Kalex	Italjet Gresini Moto2	16	0	0	0	0	11*	26th*
Total				**132**	**9**	**25**	**3**	**6**	**900**	

==== By class ====
Class	Seasons	1st GP	1st pod	1st win	Race	Win	Podiums	Pole	FLap	Pts	WChmp
Moto3	2019–2022	2019 Argentina	2019 Malaysia	2019 Valencia	68	7	20	2	4	611	0
Moto2	2023–present	2023 Portugal	2024 Qatar	2024 Americas	64	2	5	1	2	289	0
Total	2019–present				**132**	**9**	**25**	**3**	**6**	**900**	**0**

==== Races by year ====
(key) (Races in bold indicate pole position; races in italics indicate fastest lap)

Year	Class	Bike	1	2	3	4	5	6	7	8	9	10	11	12	13	14	15	16	17	18	19	20	21	22	Pos	Pts
2019	Moto3	Honda	QAT	ARG; DNS	AME; 19	SPA; Ret	FRA; Ret	ITA; 13	CAT; Ret	NED; 15	GER; 11	CZE; Ret	AUT; 27	GBR; 19	RSM; Ret	ARA; 7	THA; 14	JPN; 5	AUS; Ret	MAL; 2	VAL; 1				15th	76
2020	Moto3	Honda	QAT; 11	SPA; 17	ANC; 8	CZE; 16	AUT; 16	STY; 10	RSM; 25	EMI; 17	CAT; 4	FRA; 11	ARA; 19	TER; Ret	EUR; 2	VAL; 2	POR; 4								9th	90
2021	Moto3	GasGas	QAT; 4	DOH; 23	POR; 8	SPA; 13	FRA; 1	ITA; 9	CAT; 1	GER; 7	NED; 2	STY; 2	AUT; 1	GBR; 16	ARA; 18	RSM; 4	AME; DNS	EMI	**ALR**; Ret	VAL; 2					3rd	188
2022	Moto3	GasGas	QAT; 2	INA; 4	**ARG**; 1	AME; Ret	POR; 1	SPA; 2	FRA; 7	ITA; 1	CAT; 4	GER; 3	NED; 3	GBR; Ret	AUT; 5	RSM; DSQ	ARA; 13	JPN; 4	THA; Ret	AUS; 3	MAL; 3	VAL; 3			2nd	257
2023	Moto2	Kalex	POR; 15	ARG; 5	AME; Ret	SPA; 11	FRA; 10	ITA; 10	GER; 11	NED; 13	GBR; Ret	AUT; 8	CAT; 4	RSM; 11	IND; 4	JPN; Ret	INA; 8	AUS; Ret	THA; Ret	MAL; 25	QAT; 16	VAL; Ret			15th	84
2024	Moto2	Boscoscuro	QAT; 3	POR; 6	AME; 1	SPA; 4	FRA; 1	**CAT**; 2	ITA; 4	NED; 3	GER; 7	GBR; 4	AUT; 14	ARA; Ret	RSM; 12	EMI; Ret	INA; Ret	JPN; 14	AUS; 9	THA; 12	MAL; 14	SLD; 6			4th	191
2025	Moto2	Boscoscuro	THA	ARG	AME	QAT; 19	SPA; 22	FRA; 13	GBR; 16	ARA; 20															28th	3
2025	Moto2	Kalex									ITA	NED	GER	CZE	AUT	HUN; 16	CAT	RSM	JPN	INA	AUS	MAL	POR; 20	VAL; Ret	28th	3
2026	Moto2	Kalex	THA; Ret	BRA; 16	USA; DNS	SPA; 19	FRA; 11	CAT; 23	ITA; 17	HUN; 20	CZE; 17	NED; 21	GER; 21	GBR; 10	ARA; 22	RSM; 18	AUT; 24	JPN; Ret	INA; 21	AUS; C	MAL	QAT	POR	VAL	26th*	11*

* Season still in progress.

=== Superbike World Championship ===
==== By season ====
Season	Motorcycle	Team	Race	Win	Podium	Pole	FLap	Pts	Plcd
2025	Honda CBR1000RR-R	Honda HRC	3	0	0	0	0	6	24th
Total			**3**	**0**	**0**	**0**	**0**	**6**	

==== Races by year ====
Year	Bike	1			2			3			4			5			6			7			8			9			10			11			12			Pos.	Pts
Year	Bike	R1	SR	R2	R1	SR	R2	R1	SR	R2	R1	SR	R2	R1	SR	R2	R1	SR	R2	R1	SR	R2	R1	SR	R2	R1	SR	R2	R1	SR	R2	R1	SR	R2	R1	SR	R2	Pos.	Pts
2025	Honda	AUS	AUS	AUS	POR	POR	POR	NED	NED	NED	ITA	ITA	ITA	CZE	CZE	CZE	EMI	EMI	EMI	GBR	GBR	GBR	HUN	HUN	HUN	FRA; 11	FRA; 16	FRA; 15	ARA	ARA	ARA	POR	POR	POR	SPA	SPA	SPA	24th	6
