= Jeremy Alcoba =

Spanish motorcycle racer (born 2001)

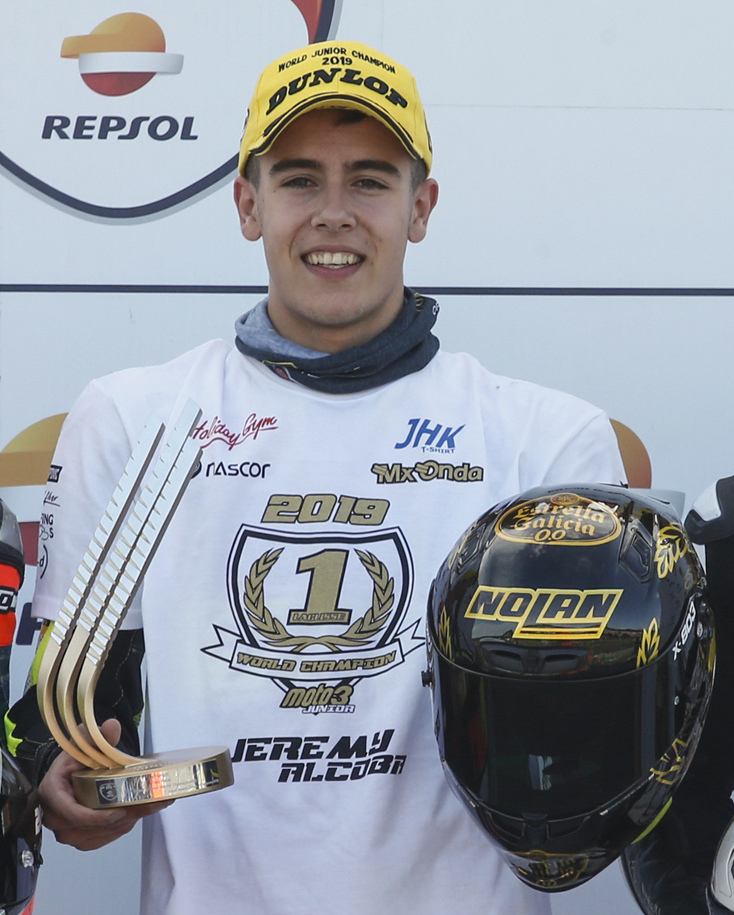
- Alcoba in 2019
- Nationality: Spanish
- Born: 15 November 2001 (age 25); Tortosa, Spain
- Current team: Kawasaki WorldSSP Team
- Bike number: 52
Motorcycle racing career statistics
Moto2 World Championship
Active years	2022–2024
Manufacturers	Kalex
2024 championship position	15th (79 pts)
Starts / Wins / Podiums / Poles / F. laps / Points; 59 / 0 / 0 / 0 / 1 / 199.5
Moto3 World Championship
Active years	2018–2021
Manufacturers	Honda
Championships	0
2021 championship position	12th (86 pts)
Starts / Wins / Podiums / Poles / F. laps / Points; 38 / 0 / 3 / 1 / 0 / 175
Supersport World Championship
Active years	2025–
Manufacturers	Kawasaki
2025 championship position	8th (183 pts)
Starts / Wins / Podiums / Poles / F. laps / Points; 48 / 4 / 9 / 1 / 1 / 457

Jeremy Alcoba Ferrer (born 15 November 2001) is a Spanish motorcycle racer.

== Career statistics ==
=== FIM CEV Moto3 Junior World Championship ===
==== Races by year ====
(key) (Races in bold indicate pole position, races in italics indicate fastest lap)

Year	Bike	1	2	3	4	5	6	7	8	9	10	11	12	Pos	Pts
2016	Honda	VAL1; 3	VAL2; 5	LMS; 6	ARA; 12	CAT1; Ret	CAT2; 12	ALB; Ret	ALG; 4	JER1; 13	JER2; 18	VAL1; Ret	VAL2; 6	11th	71
2017	Honda	ALB; 1	LMS; 3	CAT1; 7	CAT2; Ret	VAL1; 3	VAL2; 2	EST; Ret	JER1; 6	JER1; Ret	ARA; 6	VAL1; Ret	VAL2; 4	5th	119
2018	Honda	EST; Ret	VAL1; 3	VAL2; 12	FRA; 9	CAT1; 2	CAT2; 3	ARA; 2	JER1; 4	JER2; Ret	ALB; 11	VAL1; 2	VAL2; 6	4th	131
2019	Husqvarna	**EST**; 5	VAL1; 2	VAL2; 6	FRA; 3	CAT1; 3	CAT2; 1	**ARA**; 2	JER1; 2	JER2; 3	**ALB**; 1	VAL1; 1	VAL2; 8	1st	212

=== Grand Prix motorcycle racing ===
==== By season ====
Season	Class	Motorcycle	Team	Race	Win	Podium	Pole	FLap	Pts	Plcd
2018	Moto3	Honda	Junior Team Estrella Galicia 0,0	3	0	0	0	0	0	39th
2019	Moto3	Honda	Kömmerling Gresini Moto3	2	0	0	0	0	2	33rd
2020	Moto3	Honda	Kömmerling Gresini Moto3	15	0	1	0	0	87	11th
2021	Moto3	Honda	Indonesian Racing Team Gresini Moto3	18	0	2	1	0	86	12th
2022	Moto2	Kalex	Liqui Moly Intact GP	20	0	0	0	0	72	18th
2023	Moto2	Kalex	QJmotor Gresini Moto2	20	0	0	0	1	48.5	18th
2024	Moto2	Kalex	Yamaha VR46 Master Camp Team	19	0	0	0	0	79	15th
Total				**97**	**0**	**3**	**1**	**1**	**374.5**	

==== By class ====
Class	Seasons	1st GP	1st pod	1st win	Race	Win	Podiums	Pole	FLap	Pts	WChmp
Moto3	2018–2021	2018 Spain	2020 Portugal		38	0	3	1	0	175	0
Moto2	2022–2024	2022 Qatar			59	0	0	0	1	199.5	0
Total	2018–2024				**97**	**0**	**3**	**1**	**1**	**374.5**	**0**

==== Races by year ====
(key) (Races in bold indicate pole position, races in italics indicate fastest lap)

Year	Class	Bike	1	2	3	4	5	6	7	8	9	10	11	12	13	14	15	16	17	18	19	20	Pos	Pts
2018	Moto3	Honda	QAT	ARG	AME	SPA; Ret	FRA	ITA	CAT	NED	GER	CZE	AUT	GBR	RSM	ARA; 23	THA; 18	JPN	AUS	MAL	VAL		39th	0
2019	Moto3	Honda	QAT	ARG	AME	SPA	FRA	ITA	CAT	NED	GER	CZE	AUT; 21	GBR; 14	RSM	ARA	THA	JPN	AUS	MAL	VAL; DNS		33rd	2
2020	Moto3	Honda	QAT; 7	SPA; 15	ANC; 7	CZE; 7	AUT; 14	STY; Ret	RSM; 4	EMI; 13	CAT; 19	FRA; Ret	ARA; 6	TER; 15	EUR; 8	VAL; 10	POR; 3						11th	87
2021	Moto3	Honda	QAT; Ret	DOH; Ret	POR; 14	SPA; 3	FRA; 22	ITA; 15	CAT; 2	GER; 4	**NED**; 10	STY; 18	AUT; 14	GBR; 21	ARA; Ret	RSM; 16	AME; 6	EMI; 14	ALR; 4	VAL; 15			12th	86
2022	Moto2	Kalex	QAT; 14	INA; 14	ARG; 16	AME; 6	POR; 6	SPA; 12	FRA; 13	ITA; 17	CAT; 18	GER; 20	NED; 14	GBR; 14	AUT; 10	RSM; 10	ARA; Ret	JPN; Ret	THA; Ret	AUS; 6	MAL; 9	VAL; 8	18th	72
2023	Moto2	Kalex	POR; 10	ARG; 17	AME; 4	SPA; 16	FRA; 13	ITA; Ret	GER; 16	NED; 15	GBR; 11	AUT; 12	CAT; 15	RSM; 16	IND; Ret	JPN; 16	INA; 20	AUS; 4^{‡}	THA; 13	MAL; 12	QAT; 15	VAL; 15	18th	48.5
2024	Moto2	Kalex	QAT; 12	POR; 11	AME; 8	SPA; 8	FRA; 11	CAT; 4	ITA; Ret	NED; 13	GER; 14	GBR; 7	AUT; 24	ARA; 21	RSM; 17	EMI; 15	INA; 13	JPN; 4	AUS; 11	THA; Ret	MAL; Ret	SLD	15th	79

^{‡} Half points awarded as less than half of the race distance (but at least three full laps) was completed.
* Season still in progress.

=== Supersport World Championship ===
==== By season ====
Season	Motorcycle	Team	Race	Win	Podium	Pole	FLap	Pts	Plcd
2025	Kawasaki Ninja ZX-6R	Kawasaki WorldSSP Team	24	0	2	0	1	183	8th
2026	Kawasaki Ninja ZX-6R	Kawasaki WorldSSP Team	24	4	7	1	0	274	**3rd**
Total			**48**	**4**	**9**	**1**	**1**	**457**	

==== By year ====
(key) (Races in bold indicate pole position; races in italics indicate fastest lap)

Year	Bike	1		2		3		4		5		6		7		8		9		10		11		12		Pos	Pts
Year	Bike	R1	R2	R1	R2	R1	R2	R1	R2	R1	R2	R1	R2	R1	R2	R1	R2	R1	R2	R1	R2	R1	R2	R1	R2	Pos	Pts
2025	Kawasaki	AUS; 10	AUS; 5	POR; 9	POR; 6	NED; 10	NED; 7	ITA; 13	ITA; 8	CZE; 10	CZE; 14	EMI; 7	EMI; 5	GBR; 7	GBR; 8	HUN; 14	HUN; Ret	FRA; 8	FRA; 4	ARA; 10	ARA; Ret	EST; 7	EST; 3	SPA; 2	SPA; 12	8th	183
2026	Kawasaki	AUS; 10	AUS; 9	POR; 10	POR; 7	NED; 9	NED; 8	HUN; 4	HUN; 7	CZE; 13	CZE; 8	ARA; 11	ARA; 10	EMI; 14	EMI; 5	GBR; 3	GBR; 6	FRA; 15	FRA; 5	**ITA**; 1	ITA; 1	EST; 3	EST; 1	SPA; 2	SPA; 1	3rd	274
