= 2024 Dutch TT =

Motorcycle races in Assen

(Netherlands) 2024 Dutch TT
Race details
- Race 8 of 20 races in the 2024 Grand Prix motorcycle racing season
- Date: 29–30 June 2024
- Official name: Motul TT Assen
- Location: TT Circuit Assen; Assen, Netherlands
- Course: Permanent racing facility; 4.542 km (2.822 mi)

MotoGP
Pole position
| Rider | (Italy) Francesco Bagnaia | Ducati |
| Time | 1:30.540 | |
Fastest lap
| Rider | (Italy) Francesco Bagnaia | Ducati |
| Time | 1:31.866 on lap 12 | |
Podium
| First | (Italy) Francesco Bagnaia | Ducati |
| Second | (Spain) Jorge Martin | Ducati |
| Third | (Italy) Enea Bastianini | Ducati |

Moto2
Pole position
| Rider | (Spain) Fermín Aldeguer | Boscoscuro |
| Time | 1:35.269 | |
Fastest lap
| Rider | (Spain) Sergio García | Boscoscuro |
| Time | 1:35.977 on lap 8 | |
Podium
| First | (Japan) Ai Ogura | Boscoscuro |
| Second | (Spain) Fermín Aldeguer | Boscoscuro |
| Third | (Spain) Sergio García | Boscoscuro |

Moto3
Pole position
| Rider | (Spain) Ángel Piqueras | Honda |
| Time | 1:39.746 | |
Fastest lap
| Rider | (Spain) Adrián Fernández | Honda |
| Time | 1:40.405 on lap 3 | |
Podium
| First | (Spain) Iván Ortolá | KTM |
| Second | (Netherlands) Collin Veijer | Husqvarna |
| Third | (Spain) David Muñoz | KTM |

MotoE Race 1
Pole position
| Rider | (Italy) Alessandro Zaccone | Ducati |
| Time | 1:39.444 | |
Fastest lap
| Rider | (Spain) Oscar Gutiérrez | Ducati |
| Time | 1:39.836 on lap 2 | |
Podium
| First | (Spain) Héctor Garzó | Ducati |
| Second | (Spain) Oscar Gutiérrez | Ducati |
| Third | (Spain) Jordi Torres | Ducati |

MotoE Race 2
Pole position
| Rider | (Italy) Alessandro Zaccone | Ducati |
| Time | 1:39.444 | |
Fastest lap
| Rider | (Italy) Alessandro Zaccone | Ducati |
| Time | 1:39.632 on lap 3 | |
Podium
| First | (Italy) Alessandro Zaccone | Ducati |
| Second | (Spain) Oscar Gutiérrez | Ducati |
| Third | (Spain) Héctor Garzó | Ducati |

The 2024 Dutch TT (officially known as the Motul TT Assen) was the eighth round of the 2024 Grand Prix motorcycle racing season and the fifth round of the 2024 MotoE World Championship. All races (except for both MotoE races which were held on 29 June) were held at the TT Circuit Assen in Assen on 30 June 2024.

== MotoGP Sprint ==
The MotoGP Sprint was held on 29 June.

| Pos. | No. | Rider | Team | Constructor | Laps | Time/Retired | Grid | Points |
|---|---|---|---|---|---|---|---|---|
| 1 | 1 | (Italy) Francesco Bagnaia | Ducati Lenovo Team | Ducati | 13 | 19:58.090 | 1 | 12 |
| 2 | 89 | (Spain) Jorge Martín | Prima Pramac Racing | Ducati | 13 | +2.355 | 2 | 9 |
| 3 | 12 | (Spain) Maverick Viñales | Aprilia Racing | Aprilia | 13 | +4.103 | 3 | 7 |
| 4 | 23 | (Italy) Enea Bastianini | Ducati Lenovo Team | Ducati | 13 | +6.377 | 11 | 6 |
| 5 | 49 | (Italy) Fabio Di Giannantonio | Pertamina Enduro VR46 Racing Team | Ducati | 13 | +8.869 | 6 | 5 |
| 6 | 33 | (South Africa) Brad Binder | Red Bull KTM Factory Racing | KTM | 13 | +9.727 | 9 | 4 |
| 7 | 20 | (France) Fabio Quartararo | Monster Energy Yamaha MotoGP Team | Yamaha | 13 | +10.828 | 13 | 3 |
| 8 | 73 | (Spain) Álex Márquez | Gresini Racing MotoGP | Ducati | 13 | +13.196 | 4 | 2 |
| 9 | 21 | (Italy) Franco Morbidelli | Prima Pramac Racing | Ducati | 13 | +13.560 | 8 | 1 |
| 10 | 31 | (Spain) Pedro Acosta | Red Bull GasGas Tech3 | KTM | 13 | +15.972 | 10 | |
| 11 | 72 | (Italy) Marco Bezzecchi | Pertamina Enduro VR46 Racing Team | Ducati | 13 | +16.036 | 15 | |
| 12 | 88 | (Portugal) Miguel Oliveira | Trackhouse Racing | Aprilia | 13 | +16.082 | 17 | |
| 13 | 43 | (Australia) Jack Miller | Red Bull KTM Factory Racing | KTM | 13 | +18.739 | 14 | |
| 14 | 36 | (Spain) Joan Mir | Repsol Honda Team | Honda | 13 | +21.791 | 20 | |
| 15 | 37 | (Spain) Augusto Fernández | Red Bull GasGas Tech3 | KTM | 13 | +22.450 | 22 | |
| 16 | 5 | (France) Johann Zarco | Castrol Honda LCR | Honda | 13 | +23.690 | 19 | |
| 17 | 25 | (Spain) Raúl Fernández | Trackhouse Racing | Aprilia | 13 | +24.430 | 12 | |
| 18 | 30 | (Japan) Takaaki Nakagami | Idemitsu Honda LCR | Honda | 13 | +29.568 | 23 | |
| 19 | 42 | (Spain) Álex Rins | Monster Energy Yamaha MotoGP Team | Yamaha | 13 | +1:23.553 | 16 | |
| Ret | 41 | (Spain) Aleix Espargaró | Aprilia Racing | Aprilia | 12 | Accident | 5 | |
| Ret | 32 | (Italy) Lorenzo Savadori | Aprilia Racing | Aprilia | 4 | Accident | 18 | |
| Ret | 10 | (Italy) Luca Marini | Repsol Honda Team | Honda | 4 | Technical issue | 21 | |
| Ret | 93 | (Spain) Marc Márquez | Gresini Racing MotoGP | Ducati | 1 | Accident | 7 | |
Fastest sprint lap: (Italy) Francesco Bagnaia (Ducati) – 1:31.698 (lap 2)
OFFICIAL MOTOGP SPRINT REPORT

== Race ==
=== MotoGP ===
| Pos. | No. | Rider | Team | Constructor | Laps | Time/Retired | Grid | Points |
|---|---|---|---|---|---|---|---|---|
| 1 | 1 | (Italy) Francesco Bagnaia | Ducati Lenovo Team | Ducati | 26 | 40:07.214 | 1 | 25 |
| 2 | 89 | (Spain) Jorge Martín | Prima Pramac Racing | Ducati | 26 | +3.676 | 5 (Note: Three-place grid penalty for riding slowly on the racing line and hindering another rider during Q2.) | 20 |
| 3 | 23 | (Italy) Enea Bastianini | Ducati Lenovo Team | Ducati | 26 | +7.073 | 10 | 16 |
| 4 | 49 | (Italy) Fabio Di Giannantonio | Pertamina Enduro VR46 Racing Team | Ducati | 26 | +8.299 | 4 | 13 |
| 5 (Note: One-position penalty for exceeding track limits on the last lap.) | 12 | (Spain) Maverick Viñales | Aprilia Racing | Aprilia | 26 | +8.258 | 2 | 11 |
| 6 | 33 | (South Africa) Brad Binder | Red Bull KTM Factory Racing | KTM | 26 | +16.005 | 8 | 10 |
| 7 | 73 | (Spain) Álex Márquez | Gresini Racing MotoGP | Ducati | 26 | +21.095 | 3 | 9 |
| 8 | 25 | (Spain) Raúl Fernández | Trackhouse Racing | Aprilia | 26 | +22.368 | 11 | 8 |
| 9 | 21 | (Italy) Franco Morbidelli | Prima Pramac Racing | Ducati | 26 | +23.413 | 7 | 7 |
| 10 | 93 | (Spain) Marc Márquez | Gresini Racing MotoGP | Ducati | 26 | +23.868 (Note: 16-second penalty for low tyre pressure.) | 6 | 6 |
| 11 | 43 | (Australia) Jack Miller | Red Bull KTM Factory Racing | KTM | 26 | +24.004 | 13 | 5 |
| 12 | 20 | (France) Fabio Quartararo | Monster Energy Yamaha MotoGP Team | Yamaha | 26 | +24.057 | 12 | 4 |
| 13 | 5 | (France) Johann Zarco | Castrol Honda LCR | Honda | 26 | +42.767 | 17 | 3 |
| 14 | 37 | (Spain) Augusto Fernández | Red Bull GasGas Tech3 | KTM | 26 | +42.871 | 20 | 2 |
| 15 | 88 | (Portugal) Miguel Oliveira | Trackhouse Racing | Aprilia | 26 | +44.429 | 16 | 1 |
| 16 | 30 | (Japan) Takaaki Nakagami | Idemitsu Honda LCR | Honda | 26 | +46.246 | 21 | |
| 17 | 10 | (Italy) Luca Marini | Repsol Honda Team | Honda | 26 | +1:10.937 | 19 | |
| Ret | 31 | (Spain) Pedro Acosta | Red Bull GasGas Tech3 | KTM | 25 | Accident | 9 | |
| Ret | 36 | (Spain) Joan Mir | Repsol Honda Team | Honda | 6 | Accident | 18 | |
| Ret | 72 | (Italy) Marco Bezzecchi | Pertamina Enduro VR46 Racing Team | Ducati | 5 | Retired | 14 | |
| Ret | 42 | (Spain) Álex Rins | Monster Energy Yamaha MotoGP Team | Yamaha | 0 | Accident | 15 | |
| DNS | 41 | (Spain) Aleix Espargaró | Aprilia Racing | Aprilia | | Did not start | | |
| DNS | 32 | (Italy) Lorenzo Savadori | Aprilia Racing | Aprilia | | Did not start | | |
Fastest lap: (Italy) Francesco Bagnaia (Ducati) – 1:31.866 (lap 12)
OFFICIAL MOTOGP RACE REPORT

=== Moto2 ===
| Pos. | No. | Rider | Constructor | Laps | Time/Retired | Grid | Points |
|---|---|---|---|---|---|---|---|
| 1 | 79 | (Japan) Ai Ogura | Boscoscuro | 22 | 35:27.293 | 2 | 25 |
| 2 | 54 | (Spain) Fermín Aldeguer | Boscoscuro | 22 | +0.571 | 1 | 20 |
| 3 | 3 | (Spain) Sergio García | Boscoscuro | 22 | +4.252 | 3 | 16 |
| 4 | 96 | (United Kingdom) Jake Dixon | Kalex | 22 | +8.985 | 9 | 13 |
| 5 | 35 | (Thailand) Somkiat Chantra | Kalex | 22 | +9.949 | 17 | 11 |
| 6 | 14 | (Italy) Tony Arbolino | Kalex | 22 | +10.069 | 7 | 10 |
| 7 | 24 | (Spain) Marcos Ramírez | Kalex | 22 | +12.488 | 12 | 9 |
| 8 | 21 | (Spain) Alonso López | Boscoscuro | 22 | +12.592 | 5 | 8 |
| 9 | 18 | (Spain) Manuel González | Kalex | 22 | +12.734 | 4 | 7 |
| 10 | 13 | (Italy) Celestino Vietti | Kalex | 22 | +12.986 | 10 | 6 |
| 11 | 81 | (Australia) Senna Agius | Kalex | 22 | +12.945 (Note: 1-position penalty - exceeding track limits on the last lap) | 11 | 5 |
| 12 | 71 | (Italy) Dennis Foggia | Kalex | 22 | +14.689 | 19 | 4 |
| 13 | 52 | (Spain) Jeremy Alcoba | Kalex | 22 | +17.047 | 16 | 3 |
| 14 | 64 | (Netherlands) Bo Bendsneyder | Kalex | 22 | +17.623 | 20 | 2 |
| 15 | 15 | (South Africa) Darryn Binder | Kalex | 22 | +23.003 | 15 | 1 |
| 16 | 10 | (Brazil) Diogo Moreira | Kalex | 22 | +23.522 | 8 | |
| 17 | 7 | (Belgium) Barry Baltus | Kalex | 22 | +29.642 | 23 | |
| 18 | 32 | (Germany) Marcel Schrötter | Kalex | 22 | +33.235 | 22 | |
| 19 | 28 | (Spain) Izan Guevara | Kalex | 22 | +33.311 | 18 | |
| 20 | 17 | (Spain) Daniel Muñoz | Kalex | 22 | +42.661 | 21 | |
| 21 | 11 | (Spain) Álex Escrig | Forward | 22 | +50.523 | 28 | |
| 22 | 34 | (Indonesia) Mario Aji | Kalex | 22 | +52.031 | 25 | |
| 23 | 43 | (Spain) Xavier Artigas | Forward | 22 | +52.469 | 27 | |
| 24 | 5 | (Spain) Jaume Masià | Kalex | 22 | +52.531 | 26 | |
| Ret | 22 | (Japan) Ayumu Sasaki | Kalex | 7 | Accident | 24 | |
| Ret | 44 | (Spain) Arón Canet | Kalex | 5 | Accident | 13 | |
| Ret | 75 | (Spain) Albert Arenas | Kalex | 5 | Accident | 6 | |
| Ret | 84 | (Netherlands) Zonta van den Goorbergh | Kalex | 4 | Accident | 14 | |
Fastest lap: (Spain) Sergio García (Boscoscuro) – 1:35.977 (lap 8)
OFFICIAL MOTO2 RACE REPORT

=== Moto3 ===
| Pos. | No. | Rider | Constructor | Laps | Time/Retired | Grid | Points |
|---|---|---|---|---|---|---|---|
| 1 | 48 | (Spain) Iván Ortolá | KTM | 20 | 33:45.971 | 4 | 25 |
| 2 | 95 | (Netherlands) Collin Veijer | Husqvarna | 20 | +0.012 | 3 | 20 |
| 3 | 64 | (Spain) David Muñoz | KTM | 20 | +2.197 | 11 | 16 |
| 4 | 99 | (Spain) José Antonio Rueda | KTM | 20 | +2.430 | 7 | 13 |
| 5 | 80 | (Colombia) David Alonso | CFMoto | 20 | +2.460 | 13 | 11 |
| 6 | 58 | (Italy) Luca Lunetta | Honda | 20 | +2.487 | 10 | 10 |
| 7 | 31 | (Spain) Adrián Fernández | Honda | 20 | +2.531 | 8 | 9 |
| 8 | 36 | (Spain) Ángel Piqueras | Honda | 20 | +2.689 | 1 | 8 |
| 9 | 82 | (Italy) Stefano Nepa | KTM | 20 | +2.877 | 6 | 7 |
| 10 | 6 | (Japan) Ryusei Yamanaka | KTM | 20 | +2.932 | 5 | 6 |
| 11 | 96 | (Spain) Daniel Holgado | Gas Gas | 20 | +5.067 | 15 | 5 |
| 12 | 66 | (Australia) Joel Kelso | KTM | 20 | +9.420 | 14 | 4 |
| 13 | 72 | (Japan) Taiyo Furusato | Honda | 20 | +20.016 | 2 | 3 |
| 14 | 12 | (Australia) Jacob Roulstone | Gas Gas | 20 | +27.868 | 20 | 2 |
| 15 | 78 | (Spain) Joel Esteban | CFMoto | 20 | +27.940 | 9 | 1 |
| 16 | 10 | (Italy) Nicola Carraro | KTM | 20 | +28.140 | 22 | |
| 17 | 19 | (United Kingdom) Scott Ogden | Honda | 20 | +28.201 | 17 | |
| 18 | 54 | (Italy) Riccardo Rossi | KTM | 20 | +28.261 | 19 | |
| 19 | 85 | (Spain) Xabi Zurutuza | KTM | 20 | +31.102 | 21 | |
| 20 | 5 | (Thailand) Tatchakorn Buasri | Honda | 20 | +32.446 | 26 | |
| 21 | 18 | (Italy) Matteo Bertelle | Honda | 20 | +33.731 | 16 | |
| 22 | 7 | (Italy) Filippo Farioli | Honda | 20 | +33.878 | 23 | |
| 23 | 55 | (Switzerland) Noah Dettwiler | KTM | 20 | +48.306 | 25 | |
| 24 | 70 | (United Kingdom) Joshua Whatley | Honda | 20 | +52.844 | 24 | |
| Ret | 22 | (Spain) David Almansa | Honda | 14 | Accident | 18 | |
| Ret | 24 | (Japan) Tatsuki Suzuki | Husqvarna | 2 | Accident | 12 | |
Fastest lap: (Spain) Adrián Fernández (Honda) – 1:40.405 (lap 3)
OFFICIAL MOTO3 RACE REPORT

== Championship standings after the race ==
Below are the standings for the top five riders, constructors, and teams after the round.

=== MotoGP ===
Riders' Championship standings

| | Pos. | Rider | Points |
|---|---|---|---|
| | 1 | (Spain) Jorge Martín | 200 |
| | 2 | (Italy) Francesco Bagnaia | 190 |
| | 3 | (Spain) Marc Márquez | 142 |
| | 4 | (Italy) Enea Bastianini | 136 |
| 1 | 5 | (Spain) Maverick Viñales | 118 |

Constructors' Championship standings

| | Pos. | Constructor | Points |
|---|---|---|---|
| | 1 | (Italy) Ducati | 278 |
| 1 | 2 | (Italy) Aprilia | 156 |
| 1 | 3 | (Austria) KTM | 154 |
| | 4 | (Japan) Yamaha | 43 |
| | 5 | (Japan) Honda | 22 |

Teams' Championship standings

| Pos. | Team | Points |
|---|---|---|
| 1 | (Italy) Ducati Lenovo Team | 326 |
| 2 | (Italy) Prima Pramac Racing | 239 |
| 3 | (Italy) Gresini Racing MotoGP | 204 |
| 4 | (Italy) Aprilia Racing | 200 |
| 5 | (Italy) Pertamina Enduro VR46 Racing Team | 137 |

=== Moto2 ===
Riders' Championship standings

| | Pos. | Rider | Points |
|---|---|---|---|
| | 1 | (Spain) Sergio García | 138 |
| 1 | 2 | (Japan) Ai Ogura | 124 |
| 1 | 3 | (United States) Joe Roberts | 115 |
| | 4 | (Spain) Alonso López | 87 |
| 1 | 5 | (Spain) Fermín Aldeguer | 83 |

Constructors' Championship standings

| Pos. | Constructor | Points |
|---|---|---|
| 1 | (Italy) Boscoscuro | 179 |
| 2 | (Germany) Kalex | 152 |
| 3 | (Switzerland) Forward | 6 |

Teams' Championship standings

| | Pos. | Team | Points |
|---|---|---|---|
| | 1 | (Spain) MT Helmets – MSi | 262 |
| 1 | 2 | (Italy) Folladore Speed Up | 170 |
| 1 | 3 | (United States) OnlyFans American Racing Team | 159 |
| | 4 | (Italy) QJmotor Gresini Moto2 | 121 |
| | 5 | (Italy) Fantic Racing | 58 |

=== Moto3 ===
Riders' Championship standings

| | Pos. | Rider | Points |
|---|---|---|---|
| | 1 | (Colombia) David Alonso | 154 |
| 1 | 2 | (Netherlands) Collin Veijer | 115 |
| 1 | 3 | (Spain) Daniel Holgado | 111 |
| | 4 | (Spain) Iván Ortolá | 105 |
| | 5 | (Spain) David Muñoz | 76 |

Constructors' Championship standings

| | Pos. | Constructor | Points |
|---|---|---|---|
| | 1 | (China) CFMoto | 154 |
| | 2 | (Austria) KTM | 138 |
| 1 | 3 | (Sweden) Husqvarna | 125 |
| 1 | 4 | (Spain) Gas Gas | 116 |
| | 5 | (Japan) Honda | 90 |

Teams' Championship standings

| | Pos. | Team | Points |
|---|---|---|---|
| | 1 | (Spain) CFMoto Gaviota Aspar Team | 190 |
| 1 | 2 | (Spain) MT Helmets – MSi | 167 |
| 1 | 3 | (France) Red Bull GasGas Tech3 | 155 |
| | 4 | (Germany) Liqui Moly Husqvarna Intact GP | 146 |
| | 5 | (Spain) Boé Motorsports | 126 |

=== MotoE ===
Riders' Championship standings

| Pos. | Rider | Points |
|---|---|---|
| 1 | (Italy) Mattia Casadei | 140 |
| 2 | (Italy) Kevin Zannoni | 138 |
| 3 | (Spain) Oscar Gutiérrez | 137 |
| 4 | (Spain) Héctor Garzó | 129 |
| 5 | (Italy) Alessandro Zaccone | 99 |

Teams' Championship standings

| | Pos. | Team | Points |
|---|---|---|---|
| 1 | 1 | (Spain) Openbank Aspar Team | 215 |
| 1 | 2 | (Monaco) LCR E-Team | 214 |
| 1 | 3 | (Spain) Axxis – MSi | 201 |
| 1 | 4 | (Germany) Dynavolt Intact GP MotoE | 199 |
| 2 | 5 | (France) Tech3 E-Racing | 187 |

== Notes ==
| Previous race: 2024 Italian Grand Prix | FIM Grand Prix World Championship; 2024 season | Next race: 2024 German Grand Prix |
| Previous race: 2023 Dutch TT | Dutch TT | Next race: 2025 Dutch TT |
