= 2024 Italian motorcycle Grand Prix =

Motorcycle races in Scarperia e San Piero

(Italy) 2024 Italian Grand Prix
Race details
- Race 7 of 20 races in the 2024 Grand Prix motorcycle racing season
- Date: 1–2 June 2024
- Official name: Gran Premio d'Italia Brembo
- Location: Autodromo Internazionale del Mugello; Scarperia e San Piero, Italy
- Course: Permanent racing facility; 5.245 km (3.259 mi)

MotoGP
Pole position
Rider	(Spain) Jorge Martín	Ducati
Time	1:44.504	
Fastest lap
Rider	(Italy) Francesco Bagnaia	Ducati
Time	1:45.770 on lap 5	
Podium
First	(Italy) Francesco Bagnaia	Ducati
Second	(Italy) Enea Bastianini	Ducati
Third	(Spain) Jorge Martín	Ducati

Moto2
Pole position
Rider	(United States) Joe Roberts	Kalex
Time	1:49.877	
Fastest lap
Rider	(Spain) Arón Canet	Kalex
Time	1:50.476 on lap 2	
Podium
First	(United States) Joe Roberts	Kalex
Second	(Spain) Manuel González	Kalex
Third	(Spain) Alonso López	Boscoscuro

Moto3
Pole position
Rider	(Colombia) David Alonso	CFMoto
Time	1:54.194	
Fastest lap
Rider	(Netherlands) Collin Veijer	Husqvarna
Time	1:54.738 on lap 10	
Podium
First	(Colombia) David Alonso	CFMoto
Second	(Netherlands) Collin Veijer	Husqvarna
Third	(Japan) Ryusei Yamanaka	KTM

MotoE Race 1
Pole position
Rider	(Italy) Alessandro Zaccone	Ducati
Time	1:55.466	
Fastest lap
Rider	(Italy) Alessandro Zaccone	Ducati
Time	1:55.617	
Podium
First	(Italy) Mattia Casadei	Ducati
Second	(Italy) Alessandro Zaccone	Ducati
Third	(Spain) Héctor Garzó	Ducati

MotoE Race 2
Pole position
Rider	(Italy) Alessandro Zaccone	Ducati
Time	1:55.466	
Fastest lap
Rider	(Italy) Nicholas Spinelli	Ducati
Time	1:55.621	
Podium
First	(Italy) Kevin Zannoni	Ducati
Second	(Italy) Mattia Casadei	Ducati
Third	(Brazil) Eric Granado	Ducati

The 2024 Italian motorcycle Grand Prix (officially known as the Gran Premio d'Italia Brembo) was the seventh round of the 2024 Grand Prix motorcycle racing season and the fourth round of the 2024 MotoE World Championship. All races (except for both MotoE races which were held on 1 June) were held at the Autodromo Internazionale del Mugello in Scarperia e San Piero on 2 June 2024.

== MotoGP Sprint ==
The MotoGP Sprint was held on 1 June.

Pos.	No.	Rider	Team	Constructor	Laps	Time/Retired	Grid	Points
1	1	(Italy) Francesco Bagnaia	Ducati Lenovo Team	Ducati	11	19:30.251	2	12
2	93	(Spain) Marc Márquez	Gresini Racing MotoGP	Ducati	11	+1.469	4	9
3	31	(Spain) Pedro Acosta	Red Bull GasGas Tech3	KTM	11	+4.147	7	7
4	21	(Italy) Franco Morbidelli	Prima Pramac Racing	Ducati	11	+5.421	6	6
5	12	(Spain) Maverick Viñales	Aprilia Racing	Aprilia	11	+7.693	3	5
6	33	(South Africa) Brad Binder	Red Bull KTM Factory Racing	KTM	11	+8.271	13	4
7	49	(Italy) Fabio Di Giannantonio	Pertamina Enduro VR46 Racing Team	Ducati	11	+8.571	14	3
8	73	(Spain) Álex Márquez	Gresini Racing MotoGP	Ducati	11	+8.846	8	2
9	41	(Spain) Aleix Espargaró	Aprilia Racing	Aprilia	11	+8.984	9	1
10	25	(Spain) Raúl Fernández	Trackhouse Racing	Aprilia	11	+10.085	12	
11	72	(Italy) Marco Bezzecchi	Pertamina Enduro VR46 Racing Team	Ducati	11	+10.199	16	
12	43	(Australia) Jack Miller	Red Bull KTM Factory Racing	KTM	11	+13.988	19	
13	42	(Spain) Álex Rins	Monster Energy Yamaha MotoGP Team	Yamaha	11	+14.137	10	
14	44	(Spain) Pol Espargaró	Red Bull KTM Factory Racing	KTM	11	+18.259	21	
15	5	(France) Johann Zarco	Castrol Honda LCR	Honda	11	+18.309	18	
16	30	(Japan) Takaaki Nakagami	Idemitsu Honda LCR	Honda	11	+19.374	23	
17	37	(Spain) Augusto Fernández	Red Bull GasGas Tech3	KTM	11	+23.060	20	
18	32	(Italy) Lorenzo Savadori	Aprilia Racing	Aprilia	11	+24.596	22	
19	10	(Italy) Luca Marini	Repsol Honda Team	Honda	11	+25.587	24	
Ret	89	(Spain) Jorge Martín	Prima Pramac Racing	Ducati	7	Accident	1	
Ret	36	(Spain) Joan Mir	Repsol Honda Team	Honda	4	Retired	17	
Ret	23	(Italy) Enea Bastianini	Ducati Lenovo Team	Ducati	2	Collision	5	
Ret	20	(France) Fabio Quartararo	Monster Energy Yamaha MotoGP Team	Yamaha	1	Accident	15	
Ret	88	(Portugal) Miguel Oliveira	Trackhouse Racing	Aprilia	1	Accident	11	
Fastest sprint lap: (Spain) Marc Márquez (Ducati) – 1:45.198 (lap 2)
OFFICIAL MOTOGP SPRINT REPORT

== Race ==
=== MotoGP ===
Pos.	No.	Rider	Team	Constructor	Laps	Time/Retired	Grid	Points
1	1	(Italy) Francesco Bagnaia	Ducati Lenovo Team	Ducati	23	40:51.385	5 (Note: Three-place grid penalty for riding slowly on the racing line and hindering another rider during Practice.)	25
2	23	(Italy) Enea Bastianini	Ducati Lenovo Team	Ducati	23	+0.799	4	20
3	89	(Spain) Jorge Martín	Prima Pramac Racing	Ducati	23	+0.924	1	16
4	93	(Spain) Marc Márquez	Gresini Racing MotoGP	Ducati	23	+2.064	3	13
5	31	(Spain) Pedro Acosta	Red Bull GasGas Tech3	KTM	23	+7.501	7	11
6	21	(Italy) Franco Morbidelli	Prima Pramac Racing	Ducati	23	+9.890	6	10
7	49	(Italy) Fabio Di Giannantonio	Pertamina Enduro VR46 Racing Team	Ducati	23	+10.076	14	9
8	12	(Spain) Maverick Viñales	Aprilia Racing	Aprilia	23	+11.683	2	8
9	73	(Spain) Álex Márquez	Gresini Racing MotoGP	Ducati	23	+13.535	8	7
10	33	(South Africa) Brad Binder	Red Bull KTM Factory Racing	KTM	23	+15.901	13	6
11	41	(Spain) Aleix Espargaró	Aprilia Racing	Aprilia	23	+19.182	9	5
12	25	(Spain) Raúl Fernández	Trackhouse Racing	Aprilia	23	+20.307	12	4
13	72	(Italy) Marco Bezzecchi	Pertamina Enduro VR46 Racing Team	Ducati	23	+20.346	16	3
14	88	(Portugal) Miguel Oliveira	Trackhouse Racing	Aprilia	23	+23.292	11	2
15	42	(Spain) Álex Rins	Monster Energy Yamaha MotoGP Team	Yamaha	23	+23.613	10	1
16	43	(Australia) Jack Miller	Red Bull KTM Factory Racing	KTM	23	+28.417	19	
17	44	(Spain) Pol Espargaró	Red Bull KTM Factory Racing	KTM	23	+28.778	21	
18	20	(France) Fabio Quartararo	Monster Energy Yamaha MotoGP Team	Yamaha	23	+30.622	15	
19	5	(France) Johann Zarco	Castrol Honda LCR	Honda	23	+31.457	18	
20	10	(Italy) Luca Marini	Repsol Honda Team	Honda	23	+32.310	24	
21	32	(Italy) Lorenzo Savadori	Aprilia Racing	Aprilia	23	+46.724	22	
Ret	30	(Japan) Takaaki Nakagami	Idemitsu Honda LCR	Honda	9	Accident	23	
Ret	36	(Spain) Joan Mir	Repsol Honda Team	Honda	6	Accident	17	
Ret	37	(Spain) Augusto Fernández	Red Bull GasGas Tech3	KTM	4	Technical issue	20	
Fastest lap: (Italy) Francesco Bagnaia (Ducati) – 1:45.770 (lap 5)
OFFICIAL MOTOGP RACE REPORT

=== Moto2 ===
The Moto2 race was originally scheduled to run a total of 19 laps, but was reduced to 12 laps due to the delay resulting from the Moto3 race being red flagged and restarted.

Pos.	No.	Rider	Constructor	Laps	Time/Retired	Grid	Points
1	16	(United States) Joe Roberts	Kalex	12	22'24.411	1	25
2	18	(Spain) Manuel González	Kalex	12	+0.067	4	20
3	21	(Spain) Alonso López	Boscoscuro	12	+0.934	3	16
4	3	(Spain) Sergio García	Boscoscuro	12	+1.192	2	13
5	79	(Japan) Ai Ogura	Boscoscuro	12	+1.253	12	11
6	44	(Spain) Arón Canet	Kalex	12	+1.859	9	10
7	13	(Italy) Celestino Vietti	Kalex	12	+2.618	10	9
8	28	(Spain) Izan Guevara	Kalex	12	+3.349	13	8
9	35	(Thailand) Somkiat Chantra	Kalex	12	+3.450	8	7
10	24	(Spain) Marcos Ramírez	Kalex	12	+5.877	6	6
11	10	(Brazil) Diogo Moreira	Kalex	12	+6.516	23	5
12	96	(United Kingdom) Jake Dixon	Kalex	12	+10.969	15	4
13	53	(Turkey) Deniz Öncü	Kalex	12	+11.782	14	3
14	84	(Netherlands) Zonta van den Goorbergh	Kalex	12	+11.930	17	2
15	34	(Indonesia) Mario Aji	Kalex	12	+13.036	22	1
16	14	(Italy) Tony Arbolino	Kalex	12	+13.381	16	
17	81	(Australia) Senna Agius	Kalex	12	+15.564	27	
18	7	(Belgium) Barry Baltus	Kalex	12	+15.618	20	
19	75	(Spain) Albert Arenas	Kalex	12	+15.760	24	
20	71	(Italy) Dennis Foggia	Kalex	12	+17.512	25	
21	5	(Spain) Jaume Masià	Kalex	12	+17.576	28	
22	17	(Spain) Daniel Muñoz	Kalex	12	+17.779	21	
23	20	(Andorra) Xavi Cardelús	Kalex	12	+28.024	29	
24	11	(Spain) Álex Escrig	Forward	12	+34.678	30	
25	43	(Spain) Xavier Artigas	Forward	12	+35.265	31	
26	19	(Italy) Mattia Pasini	Boscoscuro	12	+1:18.428	7	
Ret	22	(Japan) Ayumu Sasaki	Kalex	10	Accident	26	
Ret	12	(Czech Republic) Filip Salač	Kalex	7	Accident	19	
Ret	15	(South Africa) Darryn Binder	Kalex	5	Accident	5	
Ret	52	(Spain) Jeremy Alcoba	Kalex	3	Accident	11	
Ret	54	(Spain) Fermín Aldeguer	Boscoscuro	3	Accident	18	
Fastest lap: (Spain) Arón Canet (Kalex) – 1:50.476 (lap 2)
OFFICIAL MOTO2 RACE REPORT

=== Moto3 ===
The race was scheduled to contest 17 laps, but was red-flagged on lap 4 following a crash between Filippo Farioli and Xabi Zurutuza. As less than two-thirds of the race distance had been completed at the time of the red flag, it was restarted and reduced to 11 laps.

Pos.	No.	Rider	Constructor	Laps	Time/Retired	Grid	Points
1	80	(Colombia) David Alonso	CFMoto	11	21:17.796	1	25
2	95	(Netherlands) Collin Veijer	Husqvarna	11	+0.142	4	20
3	6	(Japan) Ryusei Yamanaka	KTM	11	+1.253	13	16
4	72	(Japan) Taiyo Furusato	Honda	11	+1.700	8	13
5	64	(Spain) David Muñoz	KTM	11	+5.399	14	11
6	48	(Spain) Iván Ortolá	KTM	11	+12.556	2	10
7	58	(Italy) Luca Lunetta	Honda	11	+13.839	6	9
8	31	(Spain) Adrián Fernández	Honda	11	+13.971	17	8
9	12	(Australia) Jacob Roulstone	Gas Gas	11	+14.099	7	7
10	18	(Italy) Matteo Bertelle	Honda	11	+14.106	22	6
11	36	(Spain) Ángel Piqueras	Honda	11	+14.299	20	5
12	66	(Australia) Joel Kelso	KTM	11	+14.335	9	4
13	54	(Italy) Riccardo Rossi	KTM	11	+16.899	10	3
14	96	(Spain) Daniel Holgado	Gas Gas	11	+22.031	5	2
15	99	(Spain) José Antonio Rueda	KTM	11	+22.091	3	1
16	10	(Italy) Nicola Carraro	KTM	11	+22.122	21	
17	19	(United Kingdom) Scott Ogden	Honda	11	+22.205	18	
18	78	(Spain) Joel Esteban	CFMoto	11	+22.259	19	
19	7	(Italy) Filippo Farioli	Honda	11	+25.656	16	
20	55	(Switzerland) Noah Dettwiler	KTM	11	+25.857	26	
21	22	(Spain) David Almansa	Honda	11	+33.633	24	
22	5	(Thailand) Tatchakorn Buasri	Honda	11	+37.688	25	
23	70	(United Kingdom) Joshua Whatley	Honda	11	+53.010	23	
Ret	82	(Italy) Stefano Nepa	KTM	0	Accident	12	
Ret	24	(Japan) Tatsuki Suzuki	Husqvarna	0	Accident	15	
Ret	85	(Spain) Xabi Zurutuza	KTM	0	Did not restart	11	
Fastest lap: (Netherlands) Collin Veijer (Husqvarna) – 1:54.738 (lap 10)
OFFICIAL MOTO3 RACE REPORT

== Championship standings after the race ==
Below are the standings for the top five riders, constructors, and teams after the round.

=== MotoGP ===
Riders' Championship standings

	Pos.	Rider	Points
	1	(Spain) Jorge Martín	171
	2	(Italy) Francesco Bagnaia	153
	3	(Spain) Marc Márquez	136
	4	(Italy) Enea Bastianini	114
1	5	(Spain) Pedro Acosta	101

Constructors' Championship standings

	Pos.	Constructor	Points
	1	(Italy) Ducati	241
1	2	(Austria) KTM	140
1	3	(Italy) Aprilia	138
	4	(Japan) Yamaha	36
	5	(Japan) Honda	19

Teams' Championship standings

	Pos.	Team	Points
	1	(Italy) Ducati Lenovo Team	267
	2	(Italy) Prima Pramac Racing	202
1	3	(Italy) Gresini Racing MotoGP	187
1	4	(Italy) Aprilia Racing	182
	5	(Italy) Pertamina Enduro VR46 Racing Team	119

=== Moto2 ===
Riders' Championship standings

	Pos.	Rider	Points
	1	(Spain) Sergio García	122
	2	(United States) Joe Roberts	115
	3	(Japan) Ai Ogura	99
1	4	(Spain) Alonso López	79
3	5	(Spain) Manuel González	66

Constructors' Championship standings

Pos.	Constructor	Points
1	(Italy) Boscoscuro	154
2	(Germany) Kalex	139
3	(Switzerland) Forward	6

Teams' Championship standings

	Pos.	Team	Points
	1	(Spain) MT Helmets – MSi	221
1	2	(United States) OnlyFans American Racing Team	150
1	3	(Italy) MB Conveyors Speed Up	142
	4	(Italy) QJmotor Gresini Moto2	114
	5	(Italy) Fantic Racing	58

=== Moto3 ===
Riders' Championship standings

Pos.	Rider	Points
1	(Colombia) David Alonso	143
2	(Spain) Daniel Holgado	106
3	(Netherlands) Collin Veijer	95
4	(Spain) Iván Ortolá	80
5	(Spain) David Muñoz	60

Constructors' Championship standings

	Pos.	Constructor	Points
	1	(China) CFMoto	143
1	2	(Austria) KTM	113
1	3	(Spain) Gas Gas	111
	4	(Sweden) Husqvarna	105
	5	(Japan) Honda	80

Teams' Championship standings

Pos.	Team	Points
1	(Spain) CFMoto Valresa Aspar Team	178
2	(France) Red Bull GasGas Tech3	148
3	(Spain) MT Helmets – MSi	136
4	(Germany) Liqui Moly Husqvarna Intact GP	126
5	(Spain) Boé Motorsports	106

=== MotoE ===
Riders' Championship standings

	Pos.	Rider	Points
1	1	(Italy) Mattia Casadei	132
1	2	(Italy) Kevin Zannoni	126
	3	(Spain) Oscar Gutiérrez	97
	4	(Italy) Nicholas Spinelli	88
	5	(Spain) Héctor Garzó	88

Teams' Championship standings

	Pos.	Team	Points
1	1	(Monaco) LCR E-Team	202
1	2	(Spain) Openbank Aspar Team	176
	3	(France) Tech3 E-Racing	162
	4	(Spain) Axxis – MSi	138
	5	(Germany) Dynavolt Intact GP MotoE	136

== Notes ==
Previous race: 2024 Catalan Grand Prix	FIM Grand Prix World Championship; 2024 season	Next race: 2024 Dutch TT
Previous race: 2023 Italian Grand Prix	Italian motorcycle Grand Prix	Next race: 2025 Italian Grand Prix
