= Alonso López (motorcyclist) =

Spanish motorcycle racer

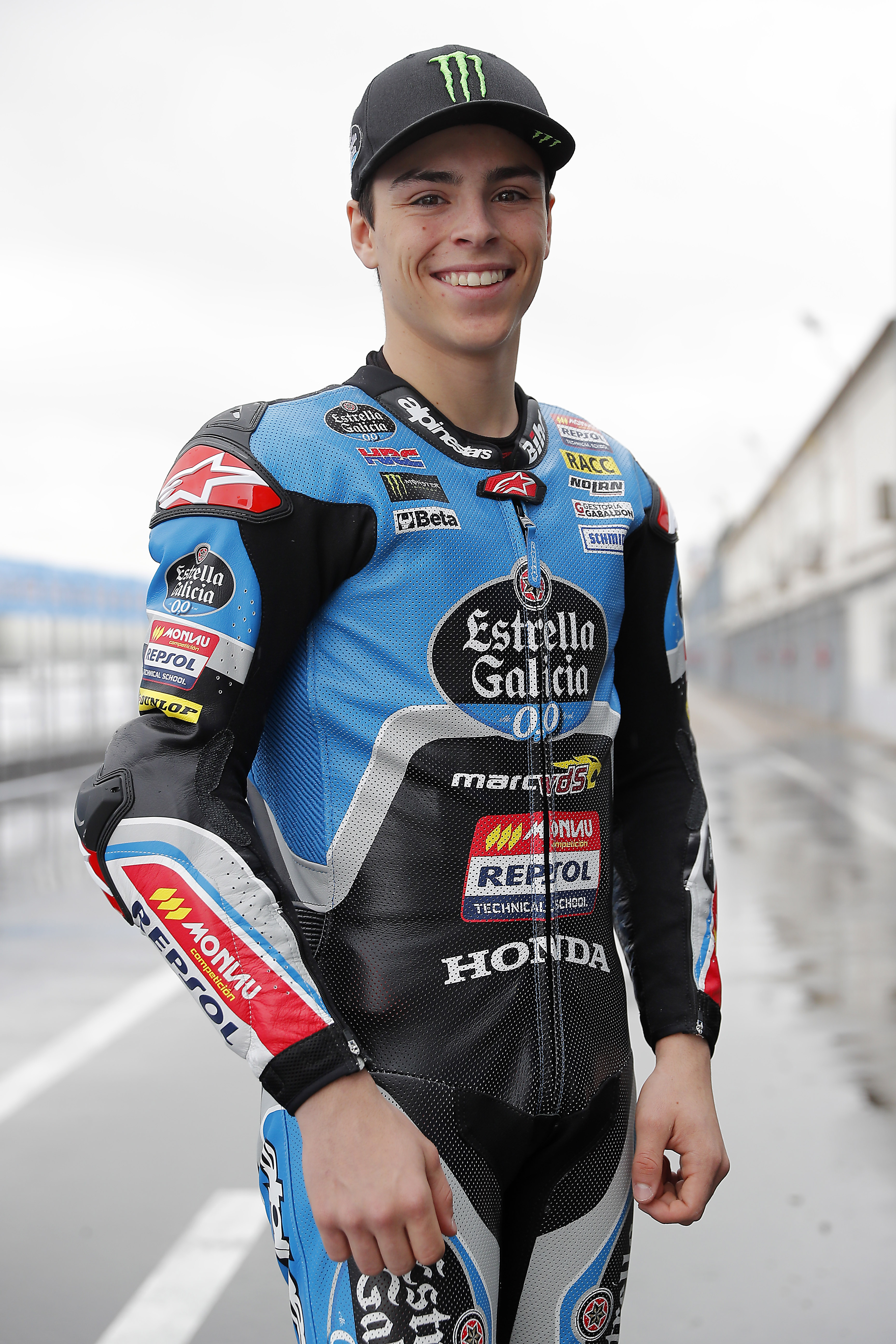
- López in 2018
- Nationality: Spanish
- Born: 21 December 2001 (age 24); Madrid, Spain
- Current team: Italjet Gresini Moto2
- Bike number: 21
Motorcycle racing career statistics
Moto2 World Championship
Active years	2021–
Manufacturers	Boscoscuro (2021–2025); Kalex (2021, 2026)
2025 championship position	18th (83 pts)
Starts / Wins / Podiums / Poles / F. laps / Points; 96 / 4 / 17 / 4 / 4 / 706
Moto3 World Championship
Active years	2018–2020
Manufacturers	Honda (2018–2019); Husqvarna (2020)
Championships	0
2020 championship position	23rd (21 pts)
Starts / Wins / Podiums / Poles / F. laps / Points; 51 / 0 / 1 / 0 / 2 / 128

Alonso López González (born 21 December 2001) is a Spanish motorcycle racer who currently competes for Italjet Gresini in the 2026 Moto2 World Championship.

== Career ==
=== Early career ===
López began racing motocross, then moved on to road racing where he won the 2014 Spanish 80cc championship and the 2015 CEV PreMoto3 Championship. In 2016 and 2017, he competed in the FIM CEV Moto3 Junior Championship, finishing third overall in his second season.

=== Moto3 World Championship ===
==== Estrella Galicia 0,0 (2018–2019) ====
In 2018, López graduated to the Moto3 World Championship.

==== Sterilgarda Max Racing Team (2020) ====
In 2020, López competed in the Moto3 World Championship riding for Sterilgarda Max Racing Team.

=== Moto2 World Championship ===
==== Speed Up Racing (2021–present) ====
In 2021, López competed in the Moto2 World Championship.

== Career statistics ==
=== Career highlights ===
- 2015: 1st, CEV PreMoto3 Championship

=== FIM CEV Moto3 Junior World Championship ===
==== Races by year ====
(key) (Races in bold indicate pole position, races in italics indicate fastest lap)

Year	Bike	1	2	3	4	5	6	7	8	9	10	11	12	Pos	Pts
2016	Honda	VAL1; 9	VAL2; 10	LMS; 13	ARA; 2	**CAT1**; 2	**CAT2**; 7	ALB; Ret	ALG	JER1; 20	JER2; Ret	VAL1; 5	VAL2; 5	5th	87
2017	Honda	ALB; Ret	LMS; 1	CAT1; 1	CAT2; Ret	VAL1; 2	VAL2; Ret	EST; Ret	**JER1**; 1	**JER2**; Ret	ARA; 9	VAL1; 4	VAL2; 2	3rd	135

=== FIM CEV Moto2 European Championship ===
==== Races by year ====
(key) (Races in bold indicate pole position, races in italics indicate fastest lap)

Year	Bike	1	2	3	4	5	6	7	8	9	10	11	12	Pos	Pts
2021	Boscoscuro	EST1; 2	EST2; 2	**VAL1**; 2	CAT1; 2	CAT2; 2	POR1; 2	POR2; 3	**ARA1**; 2	ARA2; C	**JER1**; 2	**JER2**; 1	**VAL**; 1	2nd	226

=== Grand Prix motorcycle racing ===
==== By season ====
Season	Class	Motorcycle	Team	Race	Win	Podium	Pole	FLap	Pts	Plcd
2018	Moto3	Honda	Estrella Galicia 0,0	18	0	0	0	1	36	23rd
2019	Moto3	Honda	Estrella Galicia 0,0	19	0	1	0	1	71	17th
2020	Moto3	Husqvarna	Sterilgarda Max Racing Team	14	0	0	0	0	21	23rd
2021	Moto2	Boscoscuro	Speed Up Racing	3	0	0	0	0	4	30th
2021	Moto2	Kalex	Flexbox HP40	1	0	0	0	0	4	30th
2022	Moto2	Boscoscuro	Speed Up Racing	14	2	5	1	1	155.5	8th
2023	Moto2	Boscoscuro	Speed Up Racing	20	0	5	2	1	150	7th
2024	Moto2	Boscoscuro	Speed Up Racing	20	1	5	0	2	179	6th
2025	Moto2	Boscoscuro	SpeedRS Team	22	0	1	0	0	83	18th
2026	Moto2	Kalex	Italjet Gresini Moto2	16	1	1	1	0	134.5*	9th*
Total				**147**	**4**	**18**	**4**	**6**	**834**	

==== By class ====
Class	Seasons	1st GP	1st pod	1st win	Race	Win	Podiums	Pole	FLap	Pts	WChmp
Moto3	2018–2020	2018 Qatar	2019 Thailand		51	0	1	0	2	128	0
Moto2	2021–present	2021 France	2022 Great Britain	2022 San Marino	96	4	17	4	4	706	0
Total	2018–present				**147**	**4**	**18**	**4**	**6**	**834**	**0**

==== Races by year ====
(key) (Races in bold indicate pole position, races in italics indicate fastest lap)

Year	Class	Bike	1	2	3	4	5	6	7	8	9	10	11	12	13	14	15	16	17	18	19	20	21	22	Pos	Pts
2018	Moto3	Honda	QAT; Ret	ARG; 6	AME; 17	SPA; 4	FRA; 19	ITA; 18	CAT; 8	NED; 25	GER; Ret	CZE; 18	AUT; 24	GBR; C	RSM; Ret	ARA; 20	THA; Ret	JPN; 18	AUS; 11	MAL; Ret	VAL; Ret				23rd	36
2019	Moto3	Honda	QAT; 12	ARG; Ret	AME; 8	SPA; 14	FRA; Ret	ITA; Ret	CAT; 4	NED; 10	GER; Ret	CZE; Ret	AUT; 16	GBR; 15	RSM; Ret	ARA; 5	THA; 3	JPN; 9	AUS; 13	MAL; Ret	VAL; NC				17th	71
2020	Moto3	Husqvarna	QAT; 13	SPA; 14	ANC; DNS	CZE; Ret	AUT; 23	STY; 20	RSM; Ret	EMI; Ret	CAT; 5	FRA; Ret	ARA; 17	TER; 11	EUR; Ret	VAL; Ret	POR; Ret								23rd	21
2021	Moto2	Boscoscuro	QAT	DOH	POR	SPA	FRA; Ret	ITA	CAT; 21		NED; 17	STY	AUT	GBR	ARA	RSM	AME	EMI	ALR	VAL					30th	4
2021	Moto2	Kalex								GER; 12															30th	4
2022	Moto2	Boscoscuro	QAT	INA	ARG	AME	POR	SPA	FRA; Ret	ITA; 8	CAT; 8	GER; 7	NED; 6	GBR; 2	AUT; 7	RSM; 1	ARA; Ret	JPN; 3	THA; 5^{‡}	AUS; 1	MAL; 2	**VAL**; Ret			8th	155.5
2023	Moto2	Boscoscuro	POR; Ret	**ARG**; 2	AME; 7	SPA; 3	FRA; 3	ITA; 6	GER; 5	**NED**; 6	GBR; Ret	AUT; 21	CAT; 8	RSM; 3	IND; 22	JPN; 13	INA; 25	AUS; NC	THA; 8	MAL; 22	QAT; 9	VAL; 3			7th	150
2024	Moto2	Boscoscuro	QAT; 1	POR; 25	AME; 4	SPA; Ret	FRA; 3	CAT; 7	ITA; 3	NED; 8	GER; 10	GBR; 9	AUT; 2	ARA; 4	RSM; 29	EMI; 9	INA; 3	JPN; 9	AUS; Ret	THA; 11	MAL; 13	SLD; 8			6th	179
2025	Moto2	Boscoscuro	THA; 10	ARG; 8	AME; 3	QAT; 16	SPA; DSQ	FRA; 10	GBR; 10	ARA; 10	ITA; 14	NED; 8	GER; Ret	CZE; 18	AUT; 16	HUN; Ret	CAT; 7	RSM; 15	JPN; 11	INA; 14	AUS; 15	MAL; 14	POR; 19	VAL; 11	18th	83
2026	Moto2	Kalex	THA; 7^{‡}	BRA; 11	USA; 7	SPA; Ret	FRA; 4	CAT; 8	ITA; 6	HUN; 8	CZE; WD	NED	GER	GBR; 6	**ARA**; 1	RSM; 8	AUT; 6	JPN; 9	INA; 8	AUS; C	MAL; 12	QAT; 11	POR	VAL	9th*	134.5*

^{‡} Half points awarded as less than two thirds (2022 Thailand GP)/less than half (2026 Thailand GP) of the race distance (but at least three full laps) was completed.
* Season still in progress.
