= 2024 German motorcycle Grand Prix =

Motorcycle races in Hohenstein-Ernstthal

(Germany) 2024 German Grand Prix
Race details
- Race 9 of 20 races in the 2024 Grand Prix motorcycle racing season
- Date: 6–7 July 2024
- Official name: Liqui Moly Motorrad Grand Prix Deutschland
- Location: Sachsenring; Hohenstein-Ernstthal, Germany
- Course: Permanent racing facility; 3.671 km (2.281 mi)

MotoGP
Pole position
Rider	(Spain) Jorge Martín	Ducati
Time	1:19.423	
Fastest lap
Rider	(Spain) Jorge Martín	Ducati
Time	1:20.667 on lap 6	
Podium
First	(Italy) Francesco Bagnaia	Ducati
Second	(Spain) Marc Márquez	Ducati
Third	(Spain) Álex Márquez	Ducati

Moto2
Pole position
Rider	(Italy) Celestino Vietti	Kalex
Time	1:22.778	
Fastest lap
Rider	(Italy) Tony Arbolino	Kalex
Time	1:23.449 on lap 2	
Podium
First	(Spain) Fermín Aldeguer	Boscoscuro
Second	(United Kingdom) Jake Dixon	Kalex
Third	(Japan) Ai Ogura	Boscoscuro

Moto3
Pole position
Rider	(Netherlands) Collin Veijer	Husqvarna
Time	1:24.885	
Fastest lap
Rider	(Spain) Iván Ortolá	KTM
Time	1:25.467 on lap 5	
Podium
First	(Colombia) David Alonso	CFMoto
Second	(Japan) Taiyo Furusato	Honda
Third	(Spain) Iván Ortolá	KTM

MotoE Race 1
Pole position
Rider	(Italy) Alessandro Zaccone	Ducati
Time	1:26.234	
Fastest lap
Rider	(Spain) Héctor Garzó	Ducati
Time	1:26.522 on lap 2	
Podium
First	(Spain) Héctor Garzó	Ducati
Second	(Italy) Alessandro Zaccone	Ducati
Third	(Italy) Nicholas Spinelli	Ducati

MotoE Race 2
Pole position
Rider	(Italy) Alessandro Zaccone	Ducati
Time	1:26.234	
Fastest lap
Rider	(Spain) Héctor Garzó	Ducati
Time	1:34.452 on lap 6	
Podium
First	(Spain) Héctor Garzó	Ducati
Second	(Italy) Nicholas Spinelli	Ducati
Third	(Spain) Jordi Torres	Ducati

The 2024 German motorcycle Grand Prix (officially known as the Liqui Moly Motorrad Grand Prix Deutschland) was the ninth round of the 2024 Grand Prix motorcycle racing season and the sixth round of the 2024 MotoE World Championship. All races (except for both MotoE races which were held on 6 July) were held at the Sachsenring in Hohenstein-Ernstthal on 7 July 2024.

== Practice session ==
=== MotoGP ===
==== Combined Free Practice 1–2 ====
Free Practice sessions on Friday and Saturday do not determine riders to qualify for Q2.

Fastest session lap

Pos.	No.	Biker	Constructor	Free practice times	
Pos.	No.	Biker	Constructor	FP1	FP2
1	88	(Portugal) Miguel Oliveira	Aprilia	1:21.106	**1:20.353**
2	89	(Spain) Jorge Martín	Ducati	**1:20.584**	1:20.720
3	93	(Spain) Marc Márquez	Ducati	**1:20.734**	1:20.825
4	12	(Spain) Maverick Viñales	Aprilia	1:20.878	**1:20.758**
5	1	(Italy) Francesco Bagnaia	Ducati	1:21.297	**1:20.804**
6	25	(Spain) Raúl Fernández	Aprilia	1:21.410	**1:20.961**
7	23	(Italy) Enea Bastianini	Ducati	1:21.211	**1:20.976**
8	21	(Italy) Franco Morbidelli	Ducati	1:21.645	**1:20.978**
9	73	(Spain) Álex Márquez	Ducati	1:21.258	**1:21.051**
10	31	(Spain) Pedro Acosta	KTM	1:21.151	**1:21.124**
11	20	(France) Fabio Quartararo	Yamaha	1:21.733	**1:21.141**
12	37	(Spain) Augusto Fernández	KTM	**1:21.151**	1:21.386
13	10	(Italy) Luca Marini	Honda	1:22.244	**1:21.272**
14	43	(Australia) Jack Miller	KTM	1:21.589	**1:21.319**
15	49	(Italy) Fabio Di Giannantonio	Ducati	1:21.740	**1:21.360**
16	33	(South Africa) Brad Binder	KTM	1:21.737	**1:21.425**
17	30	(Japan) Takaaki Nakagami	Honda	1:22.127	**1:21.489**
18	5	(France) Johann Zarco	Honda	1:22.190	**1:21.498**
19	72	(Italy) Marco Bezzecchi	Ducati	1:21.642	**1:21.593**
20	36	(Spain) Joan Mir	Honda	1:22.527	**1:21.974**
21	6	(Germany) Stefan Bradl	Honda	1:22.317	**1:22.049**
22	87	(Australia) Remy Gardner	Yamaha	1:22.969	**1:22.698**
23	41	(Spain) Aleix Espargaró	Aprilia	**1:32.902**	
OFFICIAL MOTOGP COMBINED FREE PRACTICE TIMES REPORT

==== Practice ====
The top ten riders (written in bold) qualified for Q2.

Pos.	No.	Biker	Constructor	
Pos.	No.	Biker	Constructor	Time results
1	12	**(Spain) Maverick Viñales**	**Aprilia**	**1:19.622**
2	89	**(Spain) Jorge Martín**	**Ducati**	**1:19.962**
3	88	**(Portugal) Miguel Oliveira**	**Aprilia**	**1:19.984**
4	73	**(Spain) Álex Márquez**	**Ducati**	**1:20.029**
5	1	**(Italy) Francesco Bagnaia**	**Ducati**	**1:20.061**
6	23	**(Italy) Enea Bastianini**	**Ducati**	**1:20.085**
7	21	**(Italy) Franco Morbidelli**	**Ducati**	**1:20.086**
8	31	**(Spain) Pedro Acosta**	**KTM**	**1:20.142**
9	49	**(Italy) Fabio Di Giannantonio**	**Ducati**	**1:20.280**
10	33	**(South Africa) Brad Binder**	**KTM**	**1:20.284**
11	43	(Australia) Jack Miller	KTM	1:20.285
12	25	(Spain) Raúl Fernández	Aprilia	1:20.344
13	93	(Spain) Marc Márquez	Ducati	1:20.384
14	20	(France) Fabio Quartararo	Yamaha	1:20.407
15	37	(Spain) Augusto Fernández	KTM	1:20.613
16	5	(France) Johann Zarco	Honda	1:20.668
17	10	(Italy) Luca Marini	Honda	1:20.868
18	30	(Japan) Takaaki Nakagami	Honda	1:20.886
19	72	(Italy) Marco Bezzecchi	Ducati	1:20.901
20	87	(Australia) Remy Gardner	Yamaha	1:21.405
21	6	(Germany) Stefan Bradl	Honda	1:21.574
22	36	(Spain) Joan Mir	Honda	1:21.847
OFFICIAL MOTOGP PRACTICE TIMES REPORT

== Qualifying ==
=== MotoGP ===
Fastest session lap

Pos.	No.	Biker	Constructor	Qualifying times		Final grid	Row
Pos.	No.	Biker	Constructor	Q1	Q2	Final grid	Row
1	89	(Spain) Jorge Martín	Ducati	Qualified in Q2	1:19.423	1	1
2	88	(Portugal) Miguel Oliveira	Aprilia	Qualified in Q2	1:19.471	2	1
3	25	(Spain) Raúl Fernández	Aprilia	1:19.678	1:19.643	3	1
4	1	(Italy) Francesco Bagnaia	Ducati	Qualified in Q2	1:19.749	4	2
5	73	(Spain) Álex Márquez	Ducati	Qualified in Q2	1:19.791	5	2
6	21	(Italy) Franco Morbidelli	Ducati	Qualified in Q2	1:19.946	6	2
7	12	(Spain) Maverick Viñales	Aprilia	Qualified in Q2	1:19.950	7	3
8	49	(Italy) Fabio Di Giannantonio	Ducati	Qualified in Q2	1:19.957	8	3
9	23	(Italy) Enea Bastianini	Ducati	Qualified in Q2	1:19.978	9	3
10	31	(Spain) Pedro Acosta	KTM	Qualified in Q2	1:20.348	10	4
11	33	(South Africa) Brad Binder	KTM	Qualified in Q2	1:20.446	11	4
12	72	(Italy) Marco Bezzecchi	Ducati	1:20.115	1:20.713	12	4
13	93	(Spain) Marc Márquez	Ducati	1:20.263	N/A	13	5
14	20	(France) Fabio Quartararo	Yamaha	1:20.310	N/A	14	5
15	37	(Spain) Augusto Fernández	KTM	1:20.419	N/A	15	5
16	43	(Australia) Jack Miller	KTM	1:20.515	N/A	16	6
17	30	(Japan) Takaaki Nakagami	Honda	1:20.553	N/A	17	6
18	10	(Italy) Luca Marini	Honda	1:20.565	N/A	18	6
19	5	(France) Johann Zarco	Honda	1:20.799	N/A	19	7
20	36	(Spain) Joan Mir	Honda	1:21.162	N/A	20	7
21	6	(Germany) Stefan Bradl	Honda	1:21.270	N/A	22 (Note: Three-place grid penalty for riding slowly on the racing line and hindering another rider during Q1.)	8
22	87	(Australia) Remy Gardner	Yamaha	1:21.297	N/A	21	7
OFFICIAL MOTOGP QUALIFYING RESULTS

== MotoGP Sprint ==
The MotoGP Sprint was held on 6 July.

Pos.	No.	Rider	Team	Constructor	Laps	Time/Retired	Grid	Points
1	89	(Spain) Jorge Martín	Prima Pramac Racing	Ducati	15	20:18.904	1	12
2	88	(Portugal) Miguel Oliveira	Trackhouse Racing	Aprilia	15	+0.676	2	9
3	1	(Italy) Francesco Bagnaia	Ducati Lenovo Team	Ducati	15	+1.311	4	7
4	23	(Italy) Enea Bastianini	Ducati Lenovo Team	Ducati	15	+1.458	9	6
5	21	(Italy) Franco Morbidelli	Prima Pramac Racing	Ducati	15	+5.600	6	5
6	93	(Spain) Marc Márquez	Gresini Racing MotoGP	Ducati	15	+6.281	13	4
7	12	(Spain) Maverick Viñales	Aprilia Racing	Aprilia	15	+6.284	7	3
8	33	(South Africa) Brad Binder	Red Bull KTM Factory Racing	KTM	15	+9.061	11	2
9	73	(Spain) Álex Márquez	Gresini Racing MotoGP	Ducati	15	+9.201	5	1
10	72	(Italy) Marco Bezzecchi	Pertamina Enduro VR46 Racing Team	Ducati	15	+10.800	12	
11	43	(Australia) Jack Miller	Red Bull KTM Factory Racing	KTM	15	+13.815	16	
12	49	(Italy) Fabio Di Giannantonio	Pertamina Enduro VR46 Racing Team	Ducati	15	+13.960	8	
13	20	(France) Fabio Quartararo	Monster Energy Yamaha MotoGP Team	Yamaha	15	+14.432	14	
14	25	(Spain) Raúl Fernández	Trackhouse Racing	Aprilia	15	+15.329	3	
15	10	(Italy) Luca Marini	Repsol Honda Team	Honda	15	+15.430	18	
16	37	(Spain) Augusto Fernández	Red Bull GasGas Tech3	KTM	15	+15.493	15	
17	5	(France) Johann Zarco	Castrol Honda LCR	Honda	15	+16.205	19	
18	30	(Japan) Takaaki Nakagami	Idemitsu Honda LCR	Honda	15	+20.321	17	
19	6	(Germany) Stefan Bradl	HRC Test Team	Honda	15	+23.733	21	
20	87	(Australia) Remy Gardner	Monster Energy Yamaha MotoGP Team	Yamaha	15	+26.366	22	
21	36	(Spain) Joan Mir	Repsol Honda Team	Honda	15	+26.668	20	
22	31	(Spain) Pedro Acosta	Red Bull GasGas Tech3	KTM	15	+26.715	10	
WD	41	(Spain) Aleix Espargaró	Aprilia Racing	Aprilia		Withdrew		
Fastest sprint lap: (Portugal) Miguel Oliveira (Aprilia) – 1:20.609 (lap 4)
OFFICIAL MOTOGP SPRINT REPORT

== Warm up practice ==
=== MotoGP ===
Francesco Bagnaia set the best time 1:20.638 and was the fastest rider at this session ahead of Franco Morbidelli and Jorge Martín.

== Race ==
=== MotoGP ===
Pos.	No.	Rider	Team	Constructor	Laps	Time/Retired	Grid	Points
1	1	(Italy) Francesco Bagnaia	Ducati Lenovo Team	Ducati	30	40:40.063	4	25
2	93	(Spain) Marc Márquez	Gresini Racing MotoGP	Ducati	30	+3.804	13	20
3	73	(Spain) Álex Márquez	Gresini Racing MotoGP	Ducati	30	+4.334	5	16
4	23	(Italy) Enea Bastianini	Ducati Lenovo Team	Ducati	30	+5.317	9	13
5	21	(Italy) Franco Morbidelli	Prima Pramac Racing	Ducati	30	+5.557	6	11
6	88	(Portugal) Miguel Oliveira	Trackhouse Racing	Aprilia	30	+10.481	2	10
7	31	(Spain) Pedro Acosta	Red Bull GasGas Tech3	KTM	30	+14.746	10	9
8	72	(Italy) Marco Bezzecchi	Pertamina Enduro VR46 Racing Team	Ducati	30	+14.930	12	8
9	33	(South Africa) Brad Binder	Red Bull KTM Factory Racing	KTM	30	+15.084	11	7
10	25	(Spain) Raúl Fernández	Trackhouse Racing	Aprilia	30	+16.384	3	6
11	20	(France) Fabio Quartararo	Monster Energy Yamaha MotoGP Team	Yamaha	30	+17.235	14	5
12	12	(Spain) Maverick Viñales	Aprilia Racing	Aprilia	30	+18.865	7	4
13	43	(Australia) Jack Miller	Red Bull KTM Factory Racing	KTM	30	+25.425	16	3
14	30	(Japan) Takaaki Nakagami	Idemitsu Honda LCR	Honda	30	+25.817	17	2
15	10	(Italy) Luca Marini	Repsol Honda Team	Honda	30	+25.854	18	1
16	37	(Spain) Augusto Fernández	Red Bull GasGas Tech3	KTM	30	+41.495 (Note: 16-second penalty for low tyre pressure.)	15	
17	5	(France) Johann Zarco	Castrol Honda LCR	Honda	30	+41.952	19	
18	36	(Spain) Joan Mir	Repsol Honda Team	Honda	30	+43.145	20	
19	87	(Australia) Remy Gardner	Monster Energy Yamaha MotoGP Team	Yamaha	30	+50.115	21	
20	6	(Germany) Stefan Bradl	HRC Test Team	Honda	30	+59.047	22	
Ret	89	(Spain) Jorge Martín	Prima Pramac Racing	Ducati	28	Accident	1	
Ret	49	(Italy) Fabio Di Giannantonio	Pertamina Enduro VR46 Racing Team	Ducati	9	Mechanical	8	
WD	41	(Spain) Aleix Espargaró	Aprilia Racing	Aprilia		Withdrew		
Fastest lap: (Spain) Jorge Martín (Ducati) – 1:20.667 (lap 6)
OFFICIAL MOTOGP RACE REPORT

=== Moto2 ===
Pos.	No.	Rider	Constructor	Laps	Time/Retired	Grid	Points
1	54	(Spain) Fermín Aldeguer	Boscoscuro	25	35:07.384	3	25
2	96	(United Kingdom) Jake Dixon	Kalex	25	+2.159	2	20
3	79	(Japan) Ai Ogura	Boscoscuro	25	+4.418	7	16
4	10	(Brazil) Diogo Moreira	Kalex	25	+4.533	8	13
5	13	(Italy) Celestino Vietti	Kalex	25	+4.543	1	11
6	35	(Thailand) Somkiat Chantra	Kalex	25	+4.651	17	10
7	3	(Spain) Sergio García	Boscoscuro	25	+5.425	12	9
8	16	(United States) Joe Roberts	Kalex	25	+6.314	11	8
9	14	(Italy) Tony Arbolino	Kalex	25	+7.018	6	7
10	21	(Spain) Alonso López	Boscoscuro	25	+8.255	10	6
11	81	(Australia) Senna Agius	Kalex	25	+9.225	4	5
12	18	(Spain) Manuel González	Kalex	25	+9.703	5	4
13	28	(Spain) Izan Guevara	Kalex	25	+10.690	13	3
14	52	(Spain) Jeremy Alcoba	Kalex	25	+12.810	23	2
15	5	(Spain) Jaume Masiá	Kalex	25	+13.845	19	1
16	71	(Italy) Dennis Foggia	Kalex	25	+14.285	18	
17	32	(Germany) Marcel Schrötter	Kalex	25	+14.483	22	
18	24	(Spain) Marcos Ramírez	Kalex	25	+15.028	9	
19	17	(Spain) Daniel Muñoz	Kalex	25	+16.496	20	
20	7	(Belgium) Barry Baltus	Kalex	25	+17.240	27	
21	75	(Spain) Albert Arenas	Kalex	25	+21.557	26	
22	11	(Spain) Álex Escrig	Forward	25	+27.073	30	
23	43	(Spain) Xavier Artigas	Forward	25	+29.351	29	
24	22	(Japan) Ayumu Sasaki	Kalex	25	+38.512	21	
25	15	(South Africa) Darryn Binder	Kalex	25	+1:13.462	16	
Ret	34	(Indonesia) Mario Aji	Kalex	22	Accident	25	
Ret	44	(Spain) Arón Canet	Kalex	18	Retired in pits	14	
Ret	84	(Netherlands) Zonta van den Goorbergh	Kalex	15	Retired in pits	28	
Ret	31	(Spain) Roberto García	Kalex	11	Accident	24	
Ret	64	(Netherlands) Bo Bendsneyder	Kalex	7	Technical issue	15	
Fastest lap: (Italy) Tony Arbolino (Kalex) – 1:23.449 (lap 2)
OFFICIAL MOTO2 RACE REPORT

== Championship standings after the race ==
Below are the standings for the top five riders, constructors, and teams after the round.

=== MotoGP ===
Riders' Championship standings

	Pos.	Rider	Points
1	1	(Italy) Francesco Bagnaia	222
1	2	(Spain) Jorge Martín	212
	3	(Spain) Marc Márquez	166
	4	(Italy) Enea Bastianini	155
	5	(Spain) Maverick Viñales	125

Constructors' Championship standings

Pos.	Constructor	Points
1	(Italy) Ducati	315
2	(Italy) Aprilia	175
3	(Austria) KTM	165
4	(Japan) Yamaha	48
5	(Japan) Honda	24

Teams' Championship standings

Pos.	Team	Points
1	(Italy) Ducati Lenovo Team	377
2	(Italy) Prima Pramac Racing	267
3	(Italy) Gresini Racing MotoGP	245
4	(Italy) Aprilia Racing	207
5	(Italy) Pertamina Enduro VR46 Racing Team	145

=== Moto2 ===
Riders' Championship standings

	Pos.	Rider	Points
	1	(Spain) Sergio García	147
	2	(Japan) Ai Ogura	140
	3	(United States) Joe Roberts	123
1	4	(Spain) Fermín Aldeguer	108
1	5	(Spain) Alonso López	93

Constructors' Championship standings

Pos.	Constructor	Points
1	(Italy) Boscoscuro	204
2	(Germany) Kalex	172
3	(Switzerland) Forward	6

Teams' Championship standings

	Pos.	Team	Points
	1	(Spain) MT Helmets – MSi	287
	2	(Italy) MB Conveyors Speed Up	201
	3	(United States) OnlyFans American Racing Team	167
	4	(Italy) QJmotor Gresini Moto2	125
2	5	(Spain) CFMoto Polarcube Aspar Team	74

=== Moto3 ===
Riders' Championship standings

	Pos.	Rider	Points
	1	(Colombia) David Alonso	179
2	2	(Spain) Iván Ortolá	121
	3	(Spain) Daniel Holgado	120
2	4	(Netherlands) Collin Veijer	115
	5	(Spain) David Muñoz	84

Constructors' Championship standings

Pos.	Constructor	Points
1	(China) CFMoto	179
2	(Austria) KTM	154
3	(Sweden) Husqvarna	132
4	(Spain) Gas Gas	125
5	(Japan) Honda	110

Teams' Championship standings

Pos.	Team	Points
1	(Spain) CFMoto Gaviota Aspar Team	217
2	(Spain) MT Helmets – MSi	193
3	(France) Red Bull GasGas Tech3	164
4	(Germany) Liqui Moly Husqvarna Intact GP	153
5	(Spain) Boé Motorsports	139

=== MotoE ===
Riders' Championship standings

	Pos.	Rider	Points
3	1	(Spain) Héctor Garzó	179
1	2	(Italy) Mattia Casadei	154
	3	(Spain) Oscar Gutiérrez	150
2	4	(Italy) Kevin Zannoni	147
	5	(Italy) Alessandro Zaccone	130

Teams' Championship standings

	Pos.	Team	Points
3	1	(Germany) Dynavolt Intact GP MotoE	264
3	2	(France) Tech3 E-Racing	254
2	3	(Spain) Openbank Aspar Team	251
1	4	(Spain) Axxis – MSi	233
3	5	(Monaco) LCR E-Team	228

== Notes ==
Previous race: 2024 Dutch TT	FIM Grand Prix World Championship; 2024 season	Next race: 2024 British Grand Prix
Previous race: 2023 German Grand Prix	German motorcycle Grand Prix	Next race: 2025 German Grand Prix
