= 2025 Austrian motorcycle Grand Prix =

Motorcycle races in Spielberg

(Austria) 2025 Austrian Grand Prix
Race details
- Race 13 of 22 races in the 2025 Grand Prix motorcycle racing season
- Date: 17 August 2025
- Official name: bwin Grand Prix of Austria
- Location: Red Bull Ring; Spielberg, Styria, Austria
- Course: Permanent racing facility; 4.348 km (2.702 mi)

MotoGP
Pole position
Rider	(Italy) Marco Bezzecchi	Aprilia
Time	1:28.060	
Fastest lap
Rider	(Italy) Marco Bezzecchi	Aprilia
Time	1:29.533 on lap 4	
Podium
First	(Spain) Marc Márquez	Ducati
Second	(Spain) Fermín Aldeguer	Ducati
Third	(Italy) Marco Bezzecchi	Aprilia

Moto2
Pole position
Rider	(Spain) Manuel González	Kalex
Time	1:32.779	
Fastest lap
Rider	(Colombia) David Alonso	Kalex
Time	1:33.549 on lap 7	
Podium
First	(Brazil) Diogo Moreira	Kalex
Second	(Spain) Daniel Holgado	Kalex
Third	(Italy) Celestino Vietti	Boscoscuro

Moto3
Pole position
Rider	(Argentina) Valentín Perrone	KTM
Time	1:39.938	
Fastest lap
Rider	(Japan) Taiyo Furusato	Honda
Time	1:40.048 on lap 13	
Podium
First	(Spain) Ángel Piqueras	KTM
Second	(Japan) Ryusei Yamanaka	KTM
Third	(Spain) David Muñoz	KTM

MotoE Race 1
Pole position
Rider	(Italy) Matteo Ferrari	Ducati
Time	1:37.918	
Fastest lap
Rider	(Spain) Óscar Gutiérrez	Ducati
Time	1:38.016 on lap 5	
Podium
First	(Italy) Matteo Ferrari	Ducati
Second	(Spain) Héctor Garzó	Ducati
Third	(Brazil) Eric Granado	Ducati

MotoE Race 2
Pole position
Rider	(Italy) Matteo Ferrari	Ducati
Time	1:37.918	
Fastest lap
Rider	(Italy) Matteo Ferrari	Ducati
Time	1:38.214 on lap 5	
Podium
First	(Italy) Matteo Ferrari	Ducati
Second	(Italy) Mattia Casadei	Ducati
Third	(Spain) Héctor Garzó	Ducati

The 2025 Austrian motorcycle Grand Prix (officially known as the bwin Grand Prix of Austria) was the thirteenth round of the 2025 Grand Prix motorcycle racing season and the third round of the 2025 MotoE World Championship. All races (except for both MotoE races which were held on 16 August) were held at the Red Bull Ring in Spielberg on 17 August 2025.

This race also marked the 1000th premier class race since the first World Championship race was held at the Isle of Man in 1949. Marc Márquez won both the Sprint and the Grand Prix, making this the first time in his career that he had won the Austrian Grand Prix.

== Background ==
In this race, MotoGP officially tested a new technology, the stability control system. This technology is designed to reduce the risk of accidents and improve rider safety, particularly in situations where control is lost when exiting a corner.

The Grand Prix Commission has extended the grid procedure for MotoGP sprint races from 15 minutes to 20 minutes, starting this weekend's Austrian Grand Prix at the Red Bull Ring in Spielberg. The change is intended to give teams more time to make adjustments to their bikes or change tires before the race begins.

== MotoGP Sprint ==
The MotoGP Sprint was held on 16 August 2025.

Pos.	No.	Rider	Team	Manufacturer	Laps	Time/Retired	Grid	Points
1	93	(Spain) Marc Márquez	Ducati Lenovo Team	Ducati	14	20:56.071	4	12
2	73	(Spain) Álex Márquez	BK8 Gresini Racing MotoGP	Ducati	14	+1.180	2	9
3	37	(Spain) Pedro Acosta	Red Bull KTM Factory Racing	KTM	14	+3.126	7	7
4	72	(Italy) Marco Bezzecchi	Aprilia Racing	Aprilia	14	+4.032	1	6
5	33	(South Africa) Brad Binder	Red Bull KTM Factory Racing	KTM	14	+4.782	11	5
6	54	(Spain) Fermín Aldeguer	BK8 Gresini Racing MotoGP	Ducati	14	+6.032	6	4
7	23	(Italy) Enea Bastianini	Red Bull KTM Tech3	KTM	14	+8.294	5	3
8	49	(Italy) Fabio Di Giannantonio	Pertamina Enduro VR46 Racing Team	Ducati	14	+10.953	15	2
9	5	(France) Johann Zarco	LCR Honda Castrol	Honda	14	+11.999	12	1
10	1	(Spain) Jorge Martín	Aprilia Racing	Aprilia	14	+12.111	14	
11	20	(France) Fabio Quartararo	Monster Energy Yamaha MotoGP Team	Yamaha	14	+13.387	16	
12	10	(Italy) Luca Marini	Honda HRC Castrol	Honda	14	+13.704	13	
13	36	(Spain) Joan Mir	Honda HRC Castrol	Honda	14	+13.822	10	
14	21	(Italy) Franco Morbidelli	Pertamina Enduro VR46 Racing Team	Ducati	14	+14.564	8	
15	79	(Japan) Ai Ogura	Trackhouse MotoGP Team	Aprilia	14	+18.414	19	
16	42	(Spain) Álex Rins	Monster Energy Yamaha MotoGP Team	Yamaha	14	+19.365	17	
17	43	(Australia) Jack Miller	Prima Pramac Yamaha MotoGP	Yamaha	14	+20.844	20	
18	88	(Portugal) Miguel Oliveira	Prima Pramac Yamaha MotoGP	Yamaha	14	+21.581	18	
Ret	25	(Spain) Raúl Fernández	Trackhouse MotoGP Team	Aprilia	9	Retired in pits	9	
Ret	63	(Italy) Francesco Bagnaia	Ducati Lenovo Team	Ducati	8	Retired in pits	3	
Fastest sprint lap: (Spain) Álex Márquez (Ducati) – 1:28.912 (lap 3)
OFFICIAL MOTOGP SPRINT REPORT

== Race ==
=== MotoGP ===
Pos.	No.	Rider	Team	Manufacturer	Laps	Time/Retired	Grid	Points
1	93	(Spain) Marc Márquez	Ducati Lenovo Team	Ducati	28	42:11.006	4	25
2	54	(Spain) Fermín Aldeguer	BK8 Gresini Racing MotoGP	Ducati	28	+1.118	6	20
3	72	(Italy) Marco Bezzecchi	Aprilia Racing	Aprilia	28	+3.426	1	16
4	37	(Spain) Pedro Acosta	Red Bull KTM Factory Racing	KTM	28	+6.864	7	13
5	23	(Italy) Enea Bastianini	Red Bull KTM Tech3	KTM	28	+8.731	5	11
6	36	(Spain) Joan Mir	Honda HRC Castrol	Honda	28	+10.132	10	10
7	33	(South Africa) Brad Binder	Red Bull KTM Factory Racing	KTM	28	+10.476	11	9
8	63	(Italy) Francesco Bagnaia	Ducati Lenovo Team	Ducati	28	+12.486	3	8
9	25	(Spain) Raúl Fernández	Trackhouse MotoGP Team	Aprilia	28	+15.472	9	7
10	73	(Spain) Álex Márquez	BK8 Gresini Racing MotoGP	Ducati	28	+15.537	2	6
11	21	(Italy) Franco Morbidelli	Pertamina Enduro VR46 Racing Team	Ducati	28	+16.185	8	5
12	5	(France) Johann Zarco	LCR Honda Castrol	Honda	28	+16.241	12	4
13	10	(Italy) Luca Marini	Honda HRC Castrol	Honda	28	+18.478	13	3
14	79	(Japan) Ai Ogura	Trackhouse MotoGP Team	Aprilia	28	+18.491	19	2
15	20	(France) Fabio Quartararo	Monster Energy Yamaha MotoGP Team	Yamaha	28	+25.256	16	1
16	42	(Spain) Álex Rins	Monster Energy Yamaha MotoGP Team	Yamaha	28	+30.316	17	
17	88	(Portugal) Miguel Oliveira	Prima Pramac Yamaha MotoGP	Yamaha	28	+34.008	18	
18	43	(Australia) Jack Miller	Prima Pramac Yamaha MotoGP	Yamaha	28	+37.478	20	
Ret	49	(Italy) Fabio Di Giannantonio	Pertamina Enduro VR46 Racing Team	Ducati	20	Technical issue	15	
Ret	1	(Spain) Jorge Martín	Aprilia Racing	Aprilia	13	Accident	14	
Fastest lap: (Italy) Marco Bezzecchi (Aprilia) – 1:29.533 (lap 4)
OFFICIAL MOTOGP RACE REPORT

=== Moto2 ===
Pos.	No.	Rider	Team	Manufacturer	Laps	Time/Retired	Grid	Points
1	10	(Brazil) Diogo Moreira	Italtrans Racing Team	Kalex	23	36:05.205	2	25
2	27	(Spain) Daniel Holgado	CFMoto Inde Aspar Team	Kalex	23	+2.375	1	20
3	13	(Italy) Celestino Vietti	Sync SpeedRS Team	Boscoscuro	23	+5.351	3	16
4	75	(Spain) Albert Arenas	Italjet Gresini Moto2	Kalex	23	+5.817	7	13
5	14	(Italy) Tony Arbolino	Blu Cru Pramac Yamaha Moto2	Boscoscuro	23	+6.448	13	11
6	4	(Spain) Iván Ortolá	QJMotor – Frinsa – MSi	Boscoscuro	23	+7.449	12	10
7	7	(Belgium) Barry Baltus	Fantic Racing Lino Sonego	Kalex	23	+7.625	11	9
8	95	(Netherlands) Collin Veijer	Red Bull KTM Ajo	Kalex	23	+7.729	9	8
9	28	(Spain) Izan Guevara	Blu Cru Pramac Yamaha Moto2	Boscoscuro	23	+8.056	17	7
10	44	(Spain) Arón Canet	Fantic Racing Lino Sonego	Kalex	23	+11.813	8	6
11	12	(Czech Republic) Filip Salač	Elf Marc VDS Racing Team	Boscoscuro	23	+13.463	18	5
12	24	(Spain) Marcos Ramírez	OnlyFans American Racing Team	Kalex	23	+13.669	14	4
13	71	(Japan) Ayumu Sasaki	RW-Idrofoglia Racing GP	Kalex	23	+15.987	15	3
14	17	(Spain) Daniel Muñoz	Red Bull KTM Ajo	Kalex	23	+19.611	16	2
15	15	(South Africa) Darryn Binder	Italjet Gresini Moto2	Kalex	23	+20.513	24	1
16	21	(Spain) Alonso López	Sync SpeedRS Team	Boscoscuro	23	+20.609	10	
17	9	(Spain) Jorge Navarro	Klint Forward Factory Team	Forward	23	+20.953	23	
18	99	(Spain) Adrián Huertas	Italtrans Racing Team	Kalex	23	+21.498	22	
19	11	(Spain) Alex Escrig	Klint Forward Factory Team	Forward	23	+24.345	25	
20	96	(United Kingdom) Jake Dixon	Elf Marc VDS Racing Team	Boscoscuro	23	+27.714	20	
21	84	(Netherlands) Zonta van den Goorbergh	RW-Idrofoglia Racing GP	Kalex	23	+31.080	19	
22	54	(Italy) Mattia Pasini	Fantic Racing Redemption	Kalex	23	+33.042	27	
23	19	(Spain) Unai Orradre	QJMotor – Frinsa – MSi	Boscoscuro	23	+40.374	26	
24	92	(Japan) Yuki Kunii	Idemitsu Honda Team Asia	Kalex	23	+41.656	28	
25	41	(Thailand) Nakarin Atiratphuvapat	Idemitsu Honda Team Asia	Kalex	23	+49.544	29	
Ret	80	(Colombia) David Alonso	CFMoto Inde Aspar Team	Kalex	18	Accident	5	
Ret	16	(United States) Joe Roberts	OnlyFans American Racing Team	Kalex	9	Accident	21	
Ret	18	(Spain) Manuel González	Liqui Moly Dynavolt Intact GP	Kalex	7	Radiator	4	
Ret	81	(Australia) Senna Agius	Liqui Moly Dynavolt Intact GP	Kalex	0	Accident	6	
Fastest lap: (Colombia) David Alonso (Kalex) - 1:33.549 (lap 7)
OFFICIAL MOTO2 RACE REPORT

=== Moto3 ===
Pos.	No.	Rider	Team	Manufacturer	Laps	Time/Retired	Grid	Points
1	36	(Spain) Ángel Piqueras	Frinsa – MT Helmets – MSi	KTM	20	33:36.516	2	25
2	6	(Japan) Ryusei Yamanaka	Frinsa – MT Helmets – MSi	KTM	20	+0.096	3	20
3	64	(Spain) David Muñoz	Liqui Moly Dynavolt Intact GP	KTM	20	+0.171	14	16
4	28	(Spain) Máximo Quiles	CFMoto Gaviota Aspar Team	KTM	20	+0.250	5	13
5	99	(Spain) José Antonio Rueda	Red Bull KTM Ajo	KTM	20	+0.541	8	11
6	72	(Japan) Taiyo Furusato	Honda Team Asia	Honda	20	+0.625	15	10
7	73	(Argentina) Valentín Perrone	Red Bull KTM Tech3	KTM	20	+1.851	1	9
8	31	(Spain) Adrián Fernández	Leopard Racing	Honda	20	+2.141	6	8
9	94	(Italy) Guido Pini	Liqui Moly Dynavolt Intact GP	KTM	20	+2.194	11	7
10	83	(Spain) Álvaro Carpe	Red Bull KTM Ajo	KTM	20	+4.181	7	6
11	66	(Australia) Joel Kelso	LevelUp – MTA	KTM	20	+4.204	10	5
12	22	(Spain) David Almansa	Leopard Racing	Honda	20	+4.256	9	4
13	71	(Italy) Dennis Foggia	CFMoto Gaviota Aspar Team	KTM	20	+4.691 (Note: 3 second penalty − failed to comply with long lap penalty)	4	3
14	12	(Australia) Jacob Roulstone	Red Bull KTM Tech3	KTM	20	+5.331	12	2
15	19	(United Kingdom) Scott Ogden	CIP Green Power	KTM	20	+9.374	13	1
16	89	(Spain) Marcos Uriarte	LevelUp – MTA	KTM	20	+21.633	16	
17	21	(South Africa) Ruché Moodley	Denssi Racing – Boé	KTM	20	+21.745	19	
18	67	(Republic of Ireland) Casey O'Gorman	Sic58 Squadra Corse	Honda	20	+21.874	20	
19	54	(Italy) Riccardo Rossi	Rivacold Snipers Team	Honda	20	+24.331	21	
20	10	(Italy) Nicola Carraro	Rivacold Snipers Team	Honda	20	+27.288 (Note: 3 second penalty − insufficient time to complete long lap penalty)	18	
21	8	(United Kingdom) Eddie O'Shea	Gryd – MLav Racing	Honda	20	+35.518	23	
22	93	(Indonesia) Arbi Aditama	Honda Team Asia	Honda	20	+35.571	24	
23	55	(Switzerland) Noah Dettwiler	CIP Green Power	KTM	20	+35.642	25	
24	82	(Italy) Stefano Nepa	Sic58 Squadra Corse	Honda	20	+43.591	22	
Ret	32	(Spain) Vicente Pérez	Gryd – MLav Racing	Honda	4	Technical issue	26	
Ret	14	(New Zealand) Cormac Buchanan	Denssi Racing – Boé	KTM	0	Accident	17	
Fastest lap: (Japan) Taiyo Furusato (Honda) - 1:40.048 (lap 13)
OFFICIAL MOTO3 RACE REPORT

=== MotoE ===
==== Race 1 ====
Pos.	No.	Rider	Team	Manufacturer	Laps	Time/Retired	Grid	Points
1	11	(Italy) Matteo Ferrari	Felo Gresini MotoE	Ducati	7	11:32.425	1	25
2	1	(Spain) Héctor Garzó	Dynavolt Intact GP	Ducati	7	+1.184	4	20
3	51	(Brazil) Eric Granado	LCR E-Team	Ducati	7	+1.235	3	16
4	99	(Spain) Óscar Gutiérrez	MSi Racing Team	Ducati	7	+1.485	8	13
5	7	(Italy) Lorenzo Baldassarri	Dynavolt Intact GP	Ducati	7	+1.969	5	11
6	47	(Hungary) Tibor Erik Varga	Rivacold Snipers Team MotoE	Ducati	7	+2.817	9	10
7	61	(Italy) Alessandro Zaccone	Aruba Cloud MotoE Team	Ducati	7	+3.959	6	9
8	9	(Italy) Andrea Mantovani	Klint Forward Factory Team	Ducati	7	+4.296	12	8
9	29	(Italy) Nicholas Spinelli	Rivacold Snipers Team MotoE	Ducati	7	+5.079	10	7
10	81	(Spain) Jordi Torres	Power Electronics Aspar Team	Ducati	7	+6.679	7	6
11	72	(Italy) Alessio Finello	Felo Gresini MotoE	Ducati	7	+7.131	13	5
12	12	(Romania) Jacopo Hosciuc	MSi Racing Team	Ducati	7	+7.334	11	4
13	21	(Italy) Kevin Zannoni	Power Electronics Aspar Team	Ducati	7	+9.495	18	3
14	19	(San Marino) Luca Bernardi	Aruba Cloud MotoE Team	Ducati	7	+11.725	15	2
15	77	(Italy) Raffaele Fusco	Ongetta Sic58 Squadra Corse	Ducati	7	+15.043	16	1
16	6	(Spain) María Herrera	Klint Forward Factory Team	Ducati	7	+15.827	14	
17	28	(Italy) Tommaso Occhi	Ongetta Sic58 Squadra Corse	Ducati	7	+28.927	17	
Ret	40	(Italy) Mattia Casadei	LCR E-Team	Ducati	0	Accident	2	
Fastest lap: (Spain) Óscar Gutiérrez (Ducati) - 1:38.016 (lap 5)
OFFICIAL MOTOE RACE 1 REPORT

==== Race 2 ====
Pos.	No.	Rider	Team	Manufacturer	Laps	Time/Retired	Grid	Points
1	11	(Italy) Matteo Ferrari	Felo Gresini MotoE	Ducati	7	11:34.231	1	25
2	40	(Italy) Mattia Casadei	LCR E-Team	Ducati	7	+0.141	2	20
3	1	(Spain) Héctor Garzó	Dynavolt Intact GP	Ducati	7	+0.506	4	16
4	47	(Hungary) Tibor Erik Varga	Rivacold Snipers Team MotoE	Ducati	7	+0.574	9	13
5	7	(Italy) Lorenzo Baldassarri	Dynavolt Intact GP	Ducati	7	+1.148	5	11
6	61	(Italy) Alessandro Zaccone	Aruba Cloud MotoE Team	Ducati	7	+1.293	6	10
7	99	(Spain) Óscar Gutiérrez	MSi Racing Team	Ducati	7	+2.081	8	9
8	29	(Italy) Nicholas Spinelli	Rivacold Snipers Team MotoE	Ducati	7	+2.246	10	8
9	81	(Spain) Jordi Torres	Power Electronics Aspar Team	Ducati	7	+2.384	7	7
10	9	(Italy) Andrea Mantovani	Klint Forward Factory Team	Ducati	7	+2.600	12	6
11	12	(Romania) Jacopo Hosciuc	MSi Racing Team	Ducati	7	+5.548	11	5
12	72	(Italy) Alessio Finello	Felo Gresini MotoE	Ducati	7	+8.593	13	4
13	19	(San Marino) Luca Bernardi	Aruba Cloud MotoE Team	Ducati	7	+13.556	15	3
14	6	(Spain) María Herrera	Klint Forward Factory Team	Ducati	7	+14.212	14	2
15	77	(Italy) Raffaele Fusco	Ongetta Sic58 Squadra Corse	Ducati	7	+22.232	16	1
16	28	(Italy) Tommaso Occhi	Ongetta Sic58 Squadra Corse	Ducati	7	+24.493	17	
17	21	(Italy) Kevin Zannoni	Power Electronics Aspar Team	Ducati	7	+1:35.946	18	
Ret	51	(Brazil) Eric Granado	LCR E-Team	Ducati	6	Accident	3	
Fastest lap: (Italy) Matteo Ferrari (Ducati) - 1:38.214 (lap 5)
OFFICIAL MOTOE RACE 2 REPORT

== Championship standings after the race ==
Below are the standings for the top five riders, constructors, and teams after the round.

=== MotoGP ===
Riders' Championship standings

	Pos.	Rider	Points
	1	(Spain) Marc Márquez	418
	2	(Spain) Álex Márquez	276
	3	(Italy) Francesco Bagnaia	221
	4	(Italy) Marco Bezzecchi	178
1	5	(Italy) Franco Morbidelli	144

Constructors' Championship standings

Pos.	Constructor	Points
1	(Italy) Ducati	467
2	(Italy) Aprilia	209
3	(Austria) KTM	195
4	(Japan) Honda	158
5	(Japan) Yamaha	134

Teams' Championship standings

Pos.	Team	Points
1	(Italy) Ducati Lenovo Team	639
2	(Italy) BK8 Gresini Racing MotoGP	397
3	(Italy) Pertamina Enduro VR46 Racing Team	288
4	(Austria) Red Bull KTM Factory Racing	226
5	(Italy) Aprilia Racing	195

=== Moto2 ===
Riders' Championship standings

	Pos.	Rider	Points
	1	(Spain) Manuel González	188
	2	(Spain) Arón Canet	169
1	3	(Brazil) Diogo Moreira	153
1	4	(Belgium) Barry Baltus	143
	5	(United Kingdom) Jake Dixon	119

Constructors' Championship standings

Pos.	Constructor	Points
1	(Germany) Kalex	308
2	(Italy) Boscoscuro	177
3	(Switzerland) Forward	13

Teams' Championship standings

Pos.	Team	Points
1	(Italy) Fantic Racing Lino Sonego	312
2	(Germany) Liqui Moly Dynavolt Intact GP	281
3	(Belgium) Elf Marc VDS Racing Team	190
4	(United States) OnlyFans American Racing Team	164
5	(Italy) Sync SpeedRS Team	164

=== Moto3 ===
Riders' Championship standings

	Pos.	Rider	Points
	1	(Spain) José Antonio Rueda	239
	2	(Spain) Ángel Piqueras	168
2	3	(Spain) David Muñoz	139
	4	(Spain) Máximo Quiles	139
2	5	(Spain) Álvaro Carpe	139

Constructors' Championship standings

Pos.	Constructor	Points
1	(Austria) KTM	325
2	(Japan) Honda	159

Teams' Championship standings

	Pos.	Team	Points
	1	(Finland) Red Bull KTM Ajo	378
	2	(Spain) Frinsa – MT Helmets – MSi	256
	3	(Spain) CFMoto Gaviota Aspar Team	215
1	4	(Germany) Liqui Moly Dynavolt Intact GP	190
1	5	(Italy) LevelUp – MTA	179

=== MotoE ===
Riders' Championship standings

	Pos.	Rider	Points
	1	(Italy) Andrea Mantovani	88
	2	(Italy) Alessandro Zaccone	80
1	3	(Italy) Lorenzo Baldassarri	69
1	4	(Spain) Jordi Torres	67
	5	(Italy) Mattia Casadei	66

Teams' Championship standings

	Pos.	Team	Points
3	1	(Germany) Dynavolt Intact GP	123
1	2	(Spain) Power Electronics Aspar Team	116
1	3	(Switzerland) Klint Forward Factory Team	113
1	4	(Monaco) LCR E-Team	100
2	5	(Italy) Aruba Cloud MotoE Team	98

== Notes ==
Previous race: 2025 Czech Republic Grand Prix	FIM Grand Prix World Championship; 2025 season	Next race: 2025 Hungarian Grand Prix
Previous race: 2024 Austrian Grand Prix	Austrian motorcycle Grand Prix	Next race: 2026 Austrian Grand Prix
