= 2023 French motorcycle Grand Prix =

Motorcycle races in Le Mans

(France) 2023 French Grand Prix
Race details
- Race 5 of 20 races in the 2023 Grand Prix motorcycle racing season
- Date: 13–14 May 2023
- Official name: Shark Grand Prix de France
- Location: Bugatti Circuit; Le Mans, France
- Course: Permanent racing facility; 4.185 km (2.600 mi)

MotoGP
Pole position
Rider	(Italy) Francesco Bagnaia	Ducati
Time	1:30.705	
Fastest lap
Rider	(Italy) Marco Bezzecchi	Ducati
Time	1:31.855 on lap 15	
Podium
First	(Italy) Marco Bezzecchi	Ducati
Second	(Spain) Jorge Martín	Ducati
Third	(France) Johann Zarco	Ducati

Moto2
Pole position
Rider	(United Kingdom) Sam Lowes	Kalex
Time	1:35.791	
Fastest lap
Rider	(Spain) Pedro Acosta	Kalex
Time	1:36.068 on lap 3	
Podium
First	(Italy) Tony Arbolino	Kalex
Second	(Czech Republic) Filip Salač	Kalex
Third	(Spain) Alonso López	Boscoscuro

Moto3
Pole position
Rider	(Japan) Ayumu Sasaki	Husqvarna
Time	1:41.630	
Fastest lap
Rider	(Japan) Ayumu Sasaki	Husqvarna
Time	1:41.476 on lap 18	
Podium
First	(Spain) Daniel Holgado	KTM
Second	(Japan) Ayumu Sasaki	Husqvarna
Third	(Spain) Jaume Masià	Honda

MotoE Race 1
Pole position
Rider	(Italy) Matteo Ferrari	Ducati
Time	1:40.971	
Fastest lap
Rider	(Italy) Matteo Ferrari	Ducati
Time	1:40.350 on lap 2	
Podium
First	(Spain) Jordi Torres	Ducati
Second	(Spain) Héctor Garzó	Ducati
Third	(Switzerland) Randy Krummenacher	Ducati

MotoE Race 2
Pole position
Rider	(Italy) Matteo Ferrari	Ducati
Time	1:40.971	
Fastest lap
Rider	(Italy) Matteo Ferrari	Ducati
Time	1:40.101 on lap 6	
Podium
First	(Italy) Matteo Ferrari	Ducati
Second	(Spain) Jordi Torres	Ducati
Third	(Spain) Héctor Garzó	Ducati

The 2023 French motorcycle Grand Prix (officially known as the Shark Grand Prix de France) was the fifth round of the 2023 Grand Prix motorcycle racing season and the first round of the 2023 MotoE World Championship. All races (except for both MotoE races which were held on 13 May) were held at the Bugatti Circuit in Le Mans on 14 May 2023. The weekend marked the 1000th round of Grand Prix motorcycle racing since its inception in 1949.

== Qualifying ==
=== MotoGP ===
Fastest session lap

Pos.	No.	Biker	Constructor	Qualifying times		Final grid	Row
Pos.	No.	Biker	Constructor	Q1	Q2	Final grid	Row
1	1	(Italy) Francesco Bagnaia	Ducati	Qualified in Q2	1'30.705	1	1
2	93	(Spain) Marc Márquez	Honda	Qualified in Q2	1:30.763	2	1
3	10	(Italy) Luca Marini	Ducati	1:31.268	1'30.842	3	1
4	43	(Australia) Jack Miller	KTM	1:31.343	1:30.984	4	2
5	89	(Spain) Jorge Martín	Ducati	Qualified in Q2	1:31.023	5	2
6	12	(Spain) Maverick Viñales	Aprilia	Qualified in Q2	1:31.120	6	2
7	72	(Italy) Marco Bezzecchi	Ducati	Qualified in Q2	1:31.173	7	3
8	73	(Spain) Álex Márquez	Ducati	Qualified in Q2	1:31.275	8	3
9	5	(France) Johann Zarco	Ducati	Qualified in Q2	1:31.298	9	3
10	33	(South Africa) Brad Binder	KTM	Qualified in Q2	1:31.445	10	4
11	41	(Spain) Aleix Espargaró	Aprilia	Qualified in Q2	1:31.523	11	4
12	37	(Spain) Augusto Fernández	KTM	Qualified in Q2	1:31.596	12	4
13	20	(France) Fabio Quartararo	Yamaha	1:31.366	N/A	13	5
14	30	(Japan) Takaaki Nakagami	Honda	1:31.545	N/A	14	5
15	49	(Italy) Fabio Di Giannantonio	Ducati	1:31.718	N/A	15	5
16	36	(Spain) Joan Mir	Honda	1:31.810	N/A	16	6
17	21	(Italy) Franco Morbidelli	Yamaha	1:31.886	N/A	17	6
18	42	(Spain) Álex Rins	Honda	1:31.959	N/A	18	6
19	9	(Italy) Danilo Petrucci	Ducati	1:32.092	N/A	19	7
20	32	(Italy) Lorenzo Savadori	Aprilia	1:32.410	N/A	20	7
21	94	(Germany) Jonas Folger	KTM	1:33.605	N/A	21	7
OFFICIAL MOTOGP QUALIFYING RESULTS

== MotoGP Sprint ==
The MotoGP Sprint was held on 13 May.

Pos.	No.	Rider	Team	Manufacturer	Laps	Time/Retired	Grid	Points
1	89	(Spain) Jorge Martín	Prima Pramac Racing	Ducati	13	19:59.037	5	12
2	33	(South Africa) Brad Binder	Red Bull KTM Factory Racing	KTM	13	+1.840	10	9
3	1	(Italy) Francesco Bagnaia	Ducati Lenovo Team	Ducati	13	+2.632	1	7
4	10	(Italy) Luca Marini	Mooney VR46 Racing Team	Ducati	13	+3.418	3	6
5	93	(Spain) Marc Márquez	Repsol Honda Team	Honda	13	+3.541	2	5
6	5	(France) Johann Zarco	Prima Pramac Racing	Ducati	13	+4.483	9	4
7	72	(Italy) Marco Bezzecchi	Mooney VR46 Racing Team	Ducati	13	+5.224	7	3
8	41	(Spain) Aleix Espargaró	Aprilia Racing	Aprilia	13	+6.359	11	2
9	12	(Spain) Maverick Viñales	Aprilia Racing	Aprilia	13	+8.336	6	1
10	30	(Japan) Takaaki Nakagami	LCR Honda Idemitsu	Honda	13	+9.439	14	
11	42	(Spain) Álex Rins	LCR Honda Castrol	Honda	13	+12.388	18	
12	49	(Italy) Fabio Di Giannantonio	Gresini Racing MotoGP	Ducati	13	+14.125	15	
13	21	(Italy) Franco Morbidelli	Monster Energy Yamaha MotoGP	Yamaha	13	+15.121	17	
14	36	(Spain) Joan Mir	Repsol Honda Team	Honda	13	+15.383	16	
15	73	(Spain) Álex Márquez	Gresini Racing MotoGP	Ducati	13	+15.593	8	
16	9	(Italy) Danilo Petrucci	Ducati Lenovo Team	Ducati	13	+19.415	19	
17	32	(Italy) Lorenzo Savadori	CryptoData RNF MotoGP Team	Aprilia	13	+26.993	20	
Ret	20	(France) Fabio Quartararo	Monster Energy Yamaha MotoGP	Yamaha	9	Accident	13	
Ret	94	(Germany) Jonas Folger	GasGas Factory Racing Tech3	KTM	8	Accident	21	
Ret	37	(Spain) Augusto Fernández	GasGas Factory Racing Tech3	KTM	5	Accident	12	
Ret	43	(Australia) Jack Miller	Red Bull KTM Factory Racing	KTM	1	Accident	4	
DNS	25	(Spain) Raúl Fernández	CryptoData RNF MotoGP Team	Aprilia		Did not start		
Fastest sprint lap: (Italy) Marco Bezzecchi (Ducati) – 1:31.343 (lap 4)
OFFICIAL MOTOGP SPRINT REPORT

- Raúl Fernández withdrew after P1 due to arm pain experienced from a recent surgery.

== Race ==
=== MotoGP ===
Pos.	No.	Rider	Team	Manufacturer	Laps	Time/Retired	Grid	Points
1	72	(Italy) Marco Bezzecchi	Mooney VR46 Racing Team	Ducati	27	41:37.970	7	25
2	89	(Spain) Jorge Martín	Prima Pramac Racing	Ducati	27	+4.256	5	20
3	5	(France) Johann Zarco	Prima Pramac Racing	Ducati	27	+4.795	9	16
4	37	(Spain) Augusto Fernández	GasGas Factory Racing Tech3	KTM	27	+6.281	12	13
5	41	(Spain) Aleix Espargaró	Aprilia Racing	Aprilia	27	+6.726	11	11
6	33	(South Africa) Brad Binder	Red Bull KTM Factory Racing	KTM	27	+13.638	10	10
7	20	(France) Fabio Quartararo	Monster Energy Yamaha MotoGP	Yamaha	27	+15.023	13	9
8	49	(Italy) Fabio Di Giannantonio	Gresini Racing MotoGP	Ducati	27	+15.826	15	8
9	30	(Japan) Takaaki Nakagami	LCR Honda Idemitsu	Honda	27	+16.370	14	7
10	21	(Italy) Franco Morbidelli	Monster Energy Yamaha MotoGP	Yamaha	27	+17.828	17	6
11	9	(Italy) Danilo Petrucci	Ducati Lenovo Team	Ducati	27	+29.735	19	5
12	32	(Italy) Lorenzo Savadori	CryptoData RNF MotoGP Team	Aprilia	27	+36.135	20	4
13	94	(Germany) Jonas Folger	GasGas Factory Racing Tech3	KTM	27	+49.808	21	3
Ret	93	(Spain) Marc Márquez	Repsol Honda Team	Honda	25	Accident	2	
Ret	43	(Australia) Jack Miller	Red Bull KTM Factory Racing	KTM	24	Accident	4	
Ret	42	(Spain) Álex Rins	LCR Honda Castrol	Honda	14	Accident	18	
Ret	36	(Spain) Joan Mir	Repsol Honda Team	Honda	12	Accident	16	
Ret	10	(Italy) Luca Marini	Mooney VR46 Racing Team	Ducati	5	Collision	3	
Ret	73	(Spain) Álex Márquez	Gresini Racing MotoGP	Ducati	5	Collision	8	
Ret	1	(Italy) Francesco Bagnaia	Ducati Lenovo Team	Ducati	4	Collision	1	
Ret	12	(Spain) Maverick Viñales	Aprilia Racing	Aprilia	4	Collision	6	
WD	25	(Spain) Raúl Fernández	CryptoData RNF MotoGP Team	Aprilia		Withdrew		
Fastest lap: (Italy) Marco Bezzecchi (Ducati) – 1:31.855 (lap 15)
OFFICIAL MOTOGP RACE REPORT

=== Moto2 ===
The race, scheduled to be run for 22 laps, was red-flagged during the second lap due to a multi-rider accident involving Manuel González, Albert Arenas, and Arón Canet. The race was later restarted over 14 laps with the original starting grid.

Pos.	No.	Biker	Constructor	Laps	Time/Retired	Grid	Points
1	14	(Italy) Tony Arbolino	Kalex	14	22:34.233	3	25
2	12	(Czech Republic) Filip Salač	Kalex	14	+0.620	4	20
3	21	(Spain) Alonso López	Boscoscuro	14	+1.537	2	16
4	13	(Italy) Celestino Vietti	Kalex	14	+2.193	6	12
5	96	(United Kingdom) Jake Dixon	Kalex	14	+3.041	8	11
6	35	(Thailand) Somkiat Chantra	Kalex	14	+4.175	7	10
7	7	(Belgium) Barry Baltus	Kalex	14	+8.853	10	9
8	54	(Spain) Fermín Aldeguer	Boscoscuro	14	+9.437	11	8
9	79	(Japan) Ai Ogura	Kalex	14	+10.696	16	6
10	11	(Spain) Sergio García	Kalex	14	+10.817	18	6
11	3	(Germany) Lukas Tulovic	Kalex	14	+11.588	15	5
12	16	(United States) Joe Roberts	Kalex	14	+12.128	17	4
13	52	(Spain) Jeremy Alcoba	Kalex	14	+12.337	20	3
14	71	(Italy) Dennis Foggia	Kalex	14	+13.061	23	2
15	22	(United Kingdom) Sam Lowes	Kalex	14	+13.695	1 (Note: Started from pit lane)	1
16	4	(United States) Sean Dylan Kelly	Kalex	14	+14.633	19	
17	24	(Spain) Marcos Ramírez	Forward	14	+18.244	21	
18	64	(Netherlands) Bo Bendsneyder	Kalex	14	+19.880	14	
19	8	(Australia) Senna Agius	Kalex	14	+22.615	24	
20	84	(Netherlands) Zonta van den Goorbergh	Kalex	14	+22.684	22	
21	19	(Italy) Lorenzo Dalla Porta	Kalex	14	+25.265	25	
22	28	(Spain) Izan Guevara	Kalex	14	+25.347	28	
23	72	(Spain) Borja Gómez	Kalex	14	+30.208	27	
Ret	17	(Spain) Álex Escrig	Kalex	6	Retired	29	
Ret	37	(Spain) Pedro Acosta	Kalex	4	Accident	5	
Ret	33	(United Kingdom) Rory Skinner	Kalex	4	Accident	26	
DNS	18	(Spain) Manuel González	Kalex		Did not restart	9	
DNS	75	(Spain) Albert Arenas	Kalex		Did not restart	12	
DNS	40	(Spain) Arón Canet	Kalex		Did not restart	13	
Fastest lap: (Spain) Pedro Acosta (Kalex) – 1:36.068 (lap 3)
OFFICIAL MOTO2 RACE REPORT

=== Moto3 ===
Pos.	No.	Biker	Constructor	Laps	Time/Retired	Grid	Points
1	96	(Spain) Daniel Holgado	KTM	20	34:07.176	3	25
2	71	(Japan) Ayumu Sasaki	Husqvarna	20	+0.150	1	20
3	5	(Spain) Jaume Masià	Honda	20	+0.946	7	16
4	48	(Spain) Iván Ortolá	KTM	20	+1.113	6	12
5	6	(Japan) Ryusei Yamanaka	Gas Gas	20	+2.409	14	11
6	53	(Turkey) Deniz Öncü	KTM	20	+2.521	4	10
7	43	(Spain) Xavier Artigas	CFMoto	20	+3.280	8	9
8	80	(Colombia) David Alonso	Gas Gas	20	+9.372	25	8
9	99	(Spain) José Antonio Rueda	KTM	20	+11.930	11	7
10	82	(Italy) Stefano Nepa	KTM	20	+14.318	13	6
11	66	(Australia) Joel Kelso	CFMoto	20	+14.438	16	5
12	27	(Japan) Kaito Toba	Honda	20	+14.606	23	4
13	24	(Japan) Tatsuki Suzuki	Honda	20	+15.077	24	3
14	38	(Spain) David Salvador	KTM	20	+16.937	12	2
15	95	(Netherlands) Collin Veijer	Husqvarna	20	+16.969	19	1
16	54	(Italy) Riccardo Rossi	Honda	20	+19.059	22	
17	18	(Italy) Matteo Bertelle	Honda	20	+19.113	21	
18	7	(Italy) Filippo Farioli	KTM	20	+19.410	17	
19	55	(Italy) Romano Fenati	Honda	20	+19.665	9	
20	22	(Spain) Ana Carrasco	KTM	20	+30.369	27	
21	64	(Indonesia) Mario Aji	Honda	20	+30.541	18	
22	70	(United Kingdom) Joshua Whatley	Honda	20	+30.794	26	
Ret	72	(Japan) Taiyo Furusato	Honda	19	Accident	15	
Ret	10	(Brazil) Diogo Moreira	KTM	10	Accident	2	
Ret	19	(United Kingdom) Scott Ogden	Honda	8	Accident	20	
Ret	16	(Italy) Andrea Migno	KTM	6	Accident	5	
Ret	63	(Malaysia) Syarifuddin Azman	KTM	2	Accident	10	
Fastest lap: (Japan) Ayumu Sasaki (Honda) – 1:41.476 (lap 18)
OFFICIAL MOTO3 RACE REPORT

=== MotoE ===
==== Race 1 ====
Pos.	No.	Biker	Laps	Time/Retired	Grid	Points
1	81	(Spain) Jordi Torres	8	13:29.947	3	25
2	4	(Spain) Héctor Garzó	8	+0.092	2	20
3	3	(Switzerland) Randy Krummenacher	8	+7.539	4	16
4	21	(Italy) Kevin Zannoni	8	+7.827	8	13
5	78	(Japan) Hikari Okubo	8	+9.138	12	11
6	53	(Spain) Tito Rabat	8	+10.933	13	10
7	34	(Italy) Kevin Manfredi	8	+11.198	5	9
8	61	(Italy) Alessandro Zaccone	8	+12.488	11	8
9	72	(Italy) Alessio Finello	8	+14.578	14	7
10	23	(Italy) Luca Salvadori	8	+14.818	15	6
11	8	(Spain) Mika Pérez	8	+18.177	16	5
12	6	(Spain) María Herrera	8	+24.739	17	4
Ret	11	(Italy) Matteo Ferrari	4	Accident	1	
Ret	40	(Italy) Mattia Casadei	3	Accident	7	
Ret	77	(Spain) Miquel Pons	3	Accident	9	
Ret	9	(Italy) Andrea Mantovani	3	Accident	10	
Ret	29	(Italy) Nicholas Spinelli	2	Accident	6	
Fastest lap: (Italy) Matteo Ferrari – 1:40.350 (lap 2)
OFFICIAL MOTOE RACE NR.1 REPORT

- All bikes manufactured by Ducati.

==== Race 2 ====
Pos.	No.	Biker	Laps	Time/Retired	Grid	Points
1	11	(Italy) Matteo Ferrari	8	13:28.079	1	25
2	81	(Spain) Jordi Torres	8	+0.712	3	20
2	4	(Spain) Héctor Garzó	8	+1.693	2	16
4	40	(Italy) Mattia Casadei	8	+3.145	7	13
5	29	(Italy) Nicholas Spinelli	8	+3.781	6	11
6	9	(Italy) Andrea Mantovani	8	+6.052	10	10
7	3	(Switzerland) Randy Krummenacher	8	+6.555	4	9
8	21	(Italy) Kevin Zannoni	8	+7.517	8	8
9	61	(Italy) Alessandro Zaccone	8	+10.143	11	7
10	78	(Japan) Hikari Okubo	8	+13.561	12	6
11	72	(Italy) Alessio Finello	8	+13.622	14	5
12	77	(Spain) Miquel Pons	8	+16.803	9	4
13	23	(Italy) Luca Salvadori	8	+17.771	15	3
14	8	(Spain) Mika Pérez	8	+18.908	16	2
15	6	(Spain) María Herrera	8	+21.219	17	1
16	53	(Spain) Tito Rabat	8	+58.583	13	
Ret	34	(Italy) Kevin Manfredi	5	Accident	5	
Fastest lap: (Italy) Matteo Ferrari – 1:40.101 (lap 6)
OFFICIAL MOTOE RACE NR.2 REPORT

- All bikes manufactured by Ducati.

== Championship standings after the race ==
Below are the standings for the top five riders, constructors, and teams after the round.

=== MotoGP ===
Riders' Championship standings

	Pos.	Rider	Points
	1	(Italy) Francesco Bagnaia	94
	2	(Italy) Marco Bezzecchi	93
	3	(South Africa) Brad Binder	81
3	4	(Spain) Jorge Martín	80
4	5	(France) Johann Zarco	66

Constructors' Championship standings

Pos.	Constructor	Points
1	(Italy) Ducati	174
2	(Austria) KTM	103
3	(Italy) Aprilia	80
4	(Japan) Honda	73
5	(Japan) Yamaha	58

Teams' Championship standings

	Pos.	Team	Points
	1	(Italy) Mooney VR46 Racing Team	147
1	2	(Italy) Prima Pramac Racing	146
1	3	(Austria) Red Bull KTM Factory Racing	130
	4	(Italy) Ducati Lenovo Team	104
	5	(Italy) Aprilia Racing	91

=== Moto2 ===
Riders' Championship standings

	Pos.	Rider	Points
1	1	(Italy) Tony Arbolino	99
1	2	(Spain) Pedro Acosta	74
1	3	(Spain) Alonso López	61
2	4	(Czech Republic) Filip Salač	60
2	5	(Spain) Arón Canet	52

Constructors' Championship standings

Pos.	Constructor	Points
1	(Germany) Kalex	125
2	(Italy) Boscoscuro	65

Teams' Championship standings

	Pos.	Team	Points
	1	(Belgium) Elf Marc VDS Racing Team	143
	2	(Finland) Red Bull KTM Ajo	101
1	3	(Italy) Lightech Speed Up	89
1	4	(Italy) QJmotor Gresini Moto2	82
2	5	(Spain) Pons Wegow Los40	75

=== Moto3 ===
Riders' Championship standings

	Pos.	Rider	Points
	1	(Spain) Daniel Holgado	84
1	2	(Spain) Iván Ortolá	63
1	3	(Spain) Jaume Masià	63
2	4	(Brazil) Diogo Moreira	55
	5	(Spain) Xavier Artigas	50

Constructors' Championship standings

	Pos.	Constructor	Points
	1	(Austria) KTM	120
	2	(Japan) Honda	88
	3	(China) CFMoto	50
1	4	(Sweden) Husqvarna	46
1	5	(Spain) Gas Gas	46

Teams' Championship standings

	Pos.	Team	Points
	1	(Luxembourg) Leopard Racing	101
	2	(Italy) Angeluss MTA Team	89
	3	(France) Red Bull KTM Tech3	86
1	4	(Finland) Red Bull KTM Ajo	70
2	5	(Spain) Gaviota GasGas Aspar M3	63

=== MotoE ===
Riders' Championship standings

Pos.	Rider	Points
1	(Spain) Jordi Torres	45
2	(Spain) Héctor Garzó	36
3	(Italy) Matteo Ferrari	25
4	(Switzerland) Randy Krummenacher	25
5	(Italy) Kevin Zannoni	21

Teams' Championship standings

Pos.	Team	Points
1	(Germany) Dynavolt Intact GP MotoE	61
2	(Spain) Openbank Aspar Team	50
3	(Italy) Felo Gresini MotoE	37
4	(France) Tech3 E-Racing	32
5	(Italy) Ongetta Sic58 Squadracorse	30

== Notes ==
Previous race: 2023 Spanish Grand Prix	FIM Grand Prix World Championship; 2023 season	Next race: 2023 Italian Grand Prix
Previous race: 2022 French Grand Prix	French motorcycle Grand Prix	Next race: 2024 French Grand Prix
