= 2023 British motorcycle Grand Prix =

Motorcycle races in Silverstone, England

(United Kingdom) 2023 British Grand Prix
Race details
- Race 9 of 20 races in the 2023 Grand Prix motorcycle racing season
- Date: 5–6 August 2023
- Official name: Monster Energy British Grand Prix
- Location: Silverstone Circuit; Silverstone, United Kingdom
- Course: Permanent racing facility; 5.900 km (3.666 mi)

MotoGP
Pole position
Rider	(Italy) Marco Bezzecchi	Ducati
Time	2:15.359	
Fastest lap
Rider	(Spain) Aleix Espargaró	Aprilia
Time	2:00.208 on lap 7	
Podium
First	(Spain) Aleix Espargaró	Aprilia
Second	(Italy) Francesco Bagnaia	Ducati
Third	(South Africa) Brad Binder	KTM

Moto2
Pole position
Rider	(Spain) Pedro Acosta	Kalex
Time	2:16.953	
Fastest lap
Rider	(Spain) Fermín Aldeguer	Boscoscuro
Time	2:04.956 on lap 16	
Podium
First	(Spain) Fermín Aldeguer	Boscoscuro
Second	(Spain) Arón Canet	Kalex
Third	(Spain) Pedro Acosta	Kalex

Moto3
Pole position
Rider	(Spain) Jaume Masià	Honda
Time	2:25.072	
Fastest lap
Rider	(Netherlands) Collin Veijer	Husqvarna
Time	2:12.869 on lap 5	
Podium
First	(Colombia) David Alonso	Gas Gas
Second	(Japan) Ayumu Sasaki	Husqvarna
Third	(Spain) Daniel Holgado	KTM

MotoE Race 1
Pole position
Rider	(Brazil) Eric Granado	Ducati
Time	2:10.912	
Fastest lap
Rider	(Italy) Kevin Manfredi	Ducati
Time	2:23.581 on lap 5	
Podium
First	(Switzerland) Randy Krummenacher	Ducati
Second	(Italy) Kevin Manfredi	Ducati
Third	(Brazil) Eric Granado	Ducati

MotoE Race 2
Pole position
Rider	(Brazil) Eric Granado	Ducati
Time	2:10.912	
Fastest lap
Rider	(Italy) Mattia Casadei	Ducati
Time	2:19.327 on lap 5	
Podium
First	(Italy) Mattia Casadei	Ducati
Second	(Brazil) Eric Granado	Ducati
Third	(Italy) Nicholas Spinelli	Ducati

The 2023 British motorcycle Grand Prix (officially known as the Monster Energy British Grand Prix) was the ninth round of the 2023 Grand Prix motorcycle racing season and the fifth round of the 2023 MotoE World Championship. All races (except for both MotoE races which are scheduled to be held on 5 August) were held at the Silverstone Circuit in Silverstone on 6 August 2023.

For the first time since 2012, the teams used the International Paddock, featuring the garages and finish line located on Sir Lewis Hamilton Straight that follows Club instead of the National Circuit pit straight that follows Woodcote.

== MotoGP New Practice Format ==
Friday's session of the MotoGP class saw little change. Only one 'Practice' session, in the Friday afternoon session, whose time record determines direct entry into Q2 or not. As usual, the top 10 are entitled to go straight into Q2. Free Practice 1 and Free Practice 2 time records are not included in the requirements for direct entry into Q2 or not.

== Practice Session ==
=== MotoGP ===
==== Combined Free Practice 1-2 ====
Free Practice sessions on Friday and Saturday do not determine riders to qualify for Q2.

Fastest session lap

Pos.	No.	Biker	Constructor	Free practice times	
Pos.	No.	Biker	Constructor	FP1	FP2
1	72	(Italy) Marco Bezzecchi	Ducati	2:00.295	2:19.095
2	10	(Italy) Luca Marini	Ducati	2:00.331	2:19.508
3	89	(Spain) Jorge Martín	Ducati	2:00.370	2:20.477
4	5	(France) Johann Zarco	Ducati	2:00.467	2:19.791
5	43	(Australia) Jack Miller	KTM	2:00.665	2:19.051
6	41	(Spain) Aleix Espargaró	Aprilia	2:00.677	2:19.754
7	21	(Italy) Franco Morbidelli	Yamaha	2:00.856	2:24.471
8	25	(Spain) Raúl Fernández	Aprilia	2:00.936	2:26.057
9	12	(Spain) Maverick Viñales	Aprilia	2:01.098	2:21.313
10	20	(France) Fabio Quartararo	Yamaha	2:01.241	2:21.980
11	73	(Spain) Álex Márquez	Ducati	2:01.259	2:19.422
12	23	(Italy) Enea Bastianini	Ducati	2:01.417	2:21.455
13	33	(South Africa) Brad Binder	KTM	2:01.451	2:19.893
14	1	(Italy) Francesco Bagnaia	Ducati	2:01.520	2:18.948
15	93	(Spain) Marc Márquez	Honda	2:01.586	2:21.803
16	49	(Italy) Fabio Di Giannantonio	Ducati	2:01.914	2:18.076
17	88	(Portugal) Miguel Oliveira	Aprilia	2:02.174	2:18.960
18	30	(Japan) Takaaki Nakagami	Honda	2:02.553	2:26.353
19	37	(Spain) Augusto Fernández	KTM	2:02.560	2:24.166
20	36	(Spain) Joan Mir	Honda	2:02.748	2:21.579
21	27	(Spain) Iker Lecuona	Honda	2:02.876	2:22.204
22	44	(Spain) Pol Espargaró	KTM	2:03.797	2:25.094
OFFICIAL MOTOGP COMBINED FREE PRACTICE TIMES REPORT

==== Practice ====
The top ten riders (written in bold) qualified for Q2.

Pos.	No.	Biker	Constructor	
Pos.	No.	Biker	Constructor	Time results
1	41	**(Spain) Aleix Espargaró**	**Aprilia**	**1:58.183**
2	89	**(Spain) Jorge Martín**	**Ducati**	**1:58.854**
3	33	**(South Africa) Brad Binder**	**KTM**	**1:58.898**
4	12	**(Spain) Maverick Viñales**	**Aprilia**	**1:58.904**
5	5	**(France) Johann Zarco**	**Ducati**	**1:58.943**
6	1	**(Italy) Francesco Bagnaia**	**Ducati**	**1:58.973**
7	72	**(Italy) Marco Bezzecchi**	**Ducati**	**1:59.018**
8	43	**(Australia) Jack Miller**	**KTM**	**1:59.201**
9	10	**(Italy) Luca Marini**	**Ducati**	**1:59.246**
10	73	**(Spain) Álex Márquez**	**Ducati**	**1:59.298**
11	20	(France) Fabio Quartararo	Yamaha	1:59.425
12	21	(Italy) Franco Morbidelli	Yamaha	1:59.454
13	93	(Spain) Marc Márquez	Honda	1:59.455
14	88	(Portugal) Miguel Oliveira	Aprilia	1:59.665
15	23	(Italy) Enea Bastianini	Ducati	1:59.693
16	49	(Italy) Fabio Di Giannantonio	Ducati	1:59.714
17	25	(Spain) Raúl Fernández	Aprilia	1:59.726
18	36	(Spain) Joan Mir	Honda	2:00.357
19	37	(Spain) Augusto Fernández	KTM	2:00.542
20	30	(Japan) Takaaki Nakagami	Honda	2:00.623
21	44	(Spain) Pol Espargaró	KTM	2:00.809
22	27	(Spain) Iker Lecuona	Honda	2:01.122
OFFICIAL MOTOGP PRACTICE TIMES REPORT

=== Moto2 ===
==== Combined Practice 1-2-3 ====
The top fourteen riders (written in bold) qualified for Q2.

Fastest session lap

Pos.	No.	Biker	Constructor	Free practice times		
Pos.	No.	Biker	Constructor	P1	P2	P3
1	40	**(Spain) Arón Canet**	**Kalex**	2:05.754	2:04.357	2:30.126
2	21	**(Spain) Alonso López**	**Boscoscuro**	2:06.310	2:04.420	2:24.459
3	54	**(Spain)** **Fermín Aldeguer**	**Boscoscuro**	2:06.487	2:04.494	2:25.505
4	37	**(Spain) Pedro Acosta**	**Kalex**	2:05.399	2:04.752	2:26.024
5	79	**(Japan) Ai Ogura**	**Kalex**	2:05.646	2:05.108	2:27.133
6	96	**(United Kingdom) Jake Dixon**	**Kalex**	2:05.869	2:05.114	**2:22.099**
7	16	**(United States) Joe Roberts**	**Kalex**	2:06.027	2:05.178	2:25.520
8	75	**(Spain)** **Albert Arenas**	**Kalex**	2:05.849	2:05.211	2:29.124
9	22	**(United Kingdom)** **Sam Lowes**	**Kalex**	2:05.982	2:05.264	2:23.241
10	35	**(Thailand) Somkiat Chantra**	**Kalex**	2:05.415	2:05.266	2:26.937
11	11	**(Spain) Sergio García**	**Kalex**	2:06.703	2:05.371	2:24.044
12	18	**(Spain) Manuel González**	**Kalex**	2:05.532	2:05.432	2:36.022
13	13	**(Italy) Celestino Vietti**	**Kalex**	2:06.987	2:05.463	2:28.347
14	12	**(Czech Republic) Filip Salač**	**Kalex**	2:06.674	2:05.638	2:25.831
15	14	(Italy) Tony Arbolino	Kalex	2:06.344	2:05.745	2:22.514
16	64	(Netherlands) Bo Bendsneyder	Kalex	2:07.012	2:05.780	2:29.799
17	7	(Belgium) Barry Baltus	Kalex	2:06.922	2:05.832	2:24.403
18	15	(South Africa) Darryn Binder	Kalex	2:07.228	2:05.998	2:06.070
19	71	(Italy) Dennis Foggia	Kalex	2:06.886	2:06.095	2:26.070
20	52	(Spain) Jeremy Alcoba	Kalex	2:07.267	2:06.160	2:27.066
21	28	(Spain) Izan Guevara	Kalex	2:06.629	2:06.167	2:27.066
22	72	(Spain) Borja Gómez	Kalex	2:07.402	2:06.736	2:27.063
23	84	(Netherlands) Zonta van den Goorbergh	Kalex	2:07.817	2:06.759	2:27.063
24	3	(Germany) Lukas Tulovic	Kalex	2:08.307	2:06.809	2:33.343
25	42	(Spain) Marcos Ramírez	Forward	2:07.486	2:06.977	2:31.545
26	33	(United Kingdom) Rory Skinner	Kalex	2:07.835	2:07.456	2:24.762
27	17	(Spain) Álex Escrig	Forward	2:09.681	2:08.149	2:26.681
28	23	(Japan) Taiga Hada	Kalex	2:11.100	2:08.293	2:25.182
29	5	(Japan) Kohta Nozane	Kalex	2:11.125	2:09.000	2:26.470
Source : OFFICIAL MOTO2 COMBINED PRACTICE TIMES REPORT

=== Moto3 ===
==== Combined Practice 1-2-3 ====
The top fourteen riders (written in bold) qualified for Q2.

Fastest session lap

Pos.	No.	Biker	Constructor	Practice times		
Pos.	No.	Biker	Constructor	P1	P2	P3
1	5	**(Spain) Jaume Masià**	**Honda**	2:12.827	**2:11.403**	2:32.766
2	24	**(Japan) Tatsuki Suzuki**	**Honda**	2:13.728	**2:11.516**	2:31.499
3	10	**(Brazil) Diogo Moreira**	**KTM**	2:13.188	**2:11.853**	'2:34.656
4	82	(Italy) **Stefano Nepa**	**KTM**	2:13.016	**2:12.028**	2:31.746
5	55	**(Italy) Romano Fenati**	**Honda**	2:13.366	**2:12.041**	2:33.072
6	48	(Spain) **Iván Ortolá**	**KTM**	2:12.817	**2:12.205**	2:31.106
7	53	**(Turkey)** **Deniz Öncü**	**KTM**	2:14.003	**2:12.235**	2:31.373
8	99	**(Spain) José Antonio Rueda**	**KTM**	2:14.447	**2:12.281**	2:35.556
9	71	**(Japan) Ayumu Sasaki**	**Husqvarna**	2:12.839	**2:12.289**	2:33.089
10	54	**(Italy) Riccardo Rossi**	**Honda**	2:13.696	**2:12.636**	2:34.443
11	19	(United Kingdom) **Scott Ogden**	**Honda**	2:14.156	**2:12.804**	2:33.881
12	18	**(Italy) Matteo Bertelle**	**Honda**	2:13.891	**2:12.906**	2:33.941
13	11	**(Japan) Kaito Toba**	**Honda**	2:14.529	**2:12.971**	2:36.837
14	96	**(Spain)** **Daniel Holgado**	**KTM**	2:13.693	**2:13.013**	2:36.360
15	44	(Spain) David Muñoz	KTM	2:13.803	**2:13.114**	2.31.797
16	80	(Colombia) David Alonso	Gas Gas	2:13.708	**2:13.221**	2:32.624
17	20	(France) Lorenzo Fellon	KTM	2:15.105	**2:13.263**	2:31.550
18	95	(Netherlands) Collin Veijer	Husqvarna	2:13.888	**2:13.323**	2:35.114
19	70	(United Kingdom) Joshua Whatley	Honda	2:14.957	**2:13.446**	2:37.378
20	6	(Japan) Ryusei Yamanaka	Gas Gas	2:15.009	**2:13.650**	2:33.973
21	72	(Japan) Taiyo Furusato	Honda	2:15.448	**2:13.791**	2:34.433
22	7	(Italy) Filippo Farioli	KTM	2:14.983	**2:13.882**	2:33.754
23	22	(Spain) Ana Carrasco	KTM	2:15.494	**2:14.049**	2:41.322
24	66	(Australia) Joel Kelso	KTM	2:14.169	**2:14.098**	2:32.446
25	38	(Spain) David Salvador	KTM	**2:14.154**	2:14.281	2:33.894
26	63	(Malaysia) Syarifuddin Azman	KTM	2:16.039	**2:14.293**	2:32.248
27	64	(Indonesia) Mario Aji	Honda	2:16.052	**2:14.480**	2:34.895
28	43	(Spain) Xavier Artigas	CFMoto	NC	**2:14.689**	2:31.820
Source : OFFICIAL MOTO3 COMBINED PRACTICE TIMES REPORT

=== MotoE ===
==== Combined Practice 1 and 2 ====
The top eight riders (written in bold) qualified in Q2.

Fastest session lap

Pos.	No.	Biker	Constructor	Practice times	
Pos.	No.	Biker	Constructor	P1	P2
1	11	**(Italy) Matteo Ferrari**	**Ducati**	2:13.121	2:11.333
2	51	**(Brazil) Eric Granado**	**Ducati**	2:12.851	2:11.481
3	4	**(Spain) Héctor Garzó**	**Ducati**	2:12.229	2:11.568
4	34	**(Italy)** **Kevin Manfredi**	**Ducati**	2:13.520	2:11.586
5	3	**(Switzerland) Randy Krummenacher**	**Ducati**	2:12.242	2:11.608
6	21	**(Italy) Kevin Zannoni**	**Ducati**	2:14.355	2:11.799
7	29	**(Italy) Nicholas Spinelli**	**Ducati**	2:12.908	2:11.845
8	81	**(Spain) Jordi Torres**	**Ducati**	2:12.717	2:11.951
9	53	**(Spain)** Tito Rabat	Ducati	2:13.130	2:12.034
10	40	**(Italy)** Mattia Casadei	Ducati	2:13.074	2:12.039
11	9	(Italy) Andrea Mantovani	Ducati	2:13.096	2:12.062
12	61	(Italy) Alessandro Zaccone	Ducati	2:13.331	2:12.296
13	77	(Spain) Miquel Pons	Ducati	2:14.483	2:12.604
14	72	(Italy) Alessio Finello	Ducati	2:15.161	2:12.858
15	23	(Italy) Luca Salvadori	Ducati	2:15.137	2:13.257
16	78	(Japan) Hikari Okubo	Ducati	2:14.901	2:13.673
17	8	(Spain) Mika Pérez	Ducati	2:16.071	2:14.082
18	6	(Spain) María Herrera	Ducati	2:17.754	2:16.037
OFFICIAL MOTOE COMBINED FREE PRACTICE TIMES REPORT

== Qualifying ==
=== MotoGP ===
Fastest session lap

Pos.	No.	Biker	Constructor	Qualifying times		Final grid	Row
Pos.	No.	Biker	Constructor	Q1	Q2	Final grid	Row
1	72	(Italy) Marco Bezzecchi	Ducati	Qualified in Q2	2:15.359	1	1
2	43	(Australia) Jack Miller	KTM	Qualified in Q2	2:15.629	2	1
3	73	(Spain) Álex Márquez	Ducati	Qualified in Q2	2:15.771	3	1
4	1	(Italy) Francesco Bagnaia	Ducati	Qualified in Q2	2:16.095	4	2
5	37	(Spain) Augusto Fernández	KTM	2:16.885	2:16.101	5	2
6	10	(Italy) Luca Marini	Ducati	Qualified in Q2	2:16.152	6	2
7	89	(Spain) Jorge Martín	Ducati	Qualified in Q2	2:16.272	7	3
8	12	(Spain) Maverick Viñales	Aprilia	Qualified in Q2	2:16.317	8	3
9	5	(France) Johann Zarco	Ducati	Qualified in Q2	2:16.661	9	3
10	33	(South Africa) Brad Binder	Ducati	Qualified in Q2	2:16.677	10	4
11	21	(Italy) Franco Morbidelli	Yamaha	2:15.884	2:16.885	11	4
12	41	(Spain) Aleix Espargaró	Aprilia	Qualified in Q2	2:17.406	12	4
13	23	(Italy) Enea Bastianini	Ducati	2:16.972	N/A	13	5
14	93	(Spain) Marc Márquez	Honda	2:17.343	N/A	14	5
15	44	(Spain) Pol Espargaró	KTM	2:18.118	N/A	15	5
16	88	(Portugal) Miguel Oliveira	Aprilia	2:18.264	N/A	16	6
17	27	(Spain) Iker Lecuona	Honda	2:18.833	N/A	17	6
18	49	(Italy) Fabio Di Giannantonio	Ducati	2:19.182	N/A	18	6
19	36	(Spain) Joan Mir	Honda	2:19.367	N/A	19	7
20	25	(Spain) Raúl Fernández	Aprilia	2:21.128	N/A	20	7
21	30	(Japan) Takaaki Nakagami	Honda	2:22.341	N/A	21	7
22	20	(France) Fabio Quartararo	Yamaha	2:22.931	N/A	22	8
OFFICIAL MOTOGP QUALIFYING RESULTS

=== Moto2 ===
Fastest session lap

Pos.	No.	Biker	Constructor	Qualifying times		Final grid	Row
Pos.	No.	Biker	Constructor	Q1	Q2	Final grid	Row
1	37	(Spain) Pedro Acosta	Kalex	Qualified in Q2	2:16.953	1	1
2	54	(Spain) Fermín Aldeguer	Boscoscuro	Qualified in Q2	2:17.653	2	1
3	84	(Netherlands) Zonta van den Goorbergh	Kalex	2:18.907	2:17.664	3	1
4	14	(Italy) Tony Arbolino	Kalex	2:17.663	2:17.880	4	2
5	21	(Spain) Alonso López	Boscoscuro	Qualified in Q2	2:17.989	5	2
6	40	(Spain) Arón Canet	Kalex	Qualified in Q2	2:18.307	6	2
7	11	(Spain) Sergio García	Kalex	Qualified in Q2	2:18.588	7	3
8	7	(Belgium) Barry Baltus	Kalex	2:18.762	2:18.626	8	3
9	22	(United Kingdom) Sam Lowes	Kalex	Qualified in Q2	2:18.686	9	3
10	16	(United States) Joe Roberts	Kalex	Qualified in Q2	2:18.811	10	4
11	96	(United Kingdom) Jake Dixon	Kalex	Qualified in Q2	2:18.975	11	4
12	12	(Czech Republic) Filip Salač	Kalex	Qualified in Q2	2:19.041	12	4
13	13	(Italy) Celestino Vietti	Kalex	Qualified in Q2	2:19.147	13	5
14	15	(South Africa) Darryn Binder	Kalex	2:19.208	2:19.222	14	5
15	35	(Thailand) Somkiat Chantra	Kalex	Qualified in Q2	2:19.316	15	5
16	79	(Japan) Ai Ogura	Kalex	Qualified in Q2	2:20.010	16	6
17	18	(Spain) Manuel González	Kalex	Qualified in Q2	2:20.048	17	6
18	75	(Netherlands) Albert Arenas	Kalex	Qualified in Q2	NC	18	6
19	52	(Spain) Jeremy Alcoba	Kalex	2:19.564	N/A	19	7
20	28	(Spain) Izan Guevara	Kalex	2:20.023	N/A	20	7
21	33	(United Kingdom) Rory Skinner	Kalex	2:20.643	N/A	21	7
22	23	(Japan) Taiga Hada	Kalex	2:21.385	N/A	22	8
23	3	(Germany) Lukas Tulovic	Kalex	2:21.518	N/A	23	8
24	72	(Spain) Borja Gómez	Kalex	2:21.602	N/A	24	8
25	42	(Spain) Marcos Ramírez	Forward	2:21.814	N/A	25	9
26	64	(Netherlands) Bo Bendsneyder	Kalex	2:21.943	N/A	26	9
27	5	(Japan) Kohta Nozane	Kalex	2:22.068	N/A	27	9
28	17	(Spain) Álex Escrig	Forward	2:22.297	N/A	28	10
29	71	(Italy) Dennis Foggia	Kalex	2:23.268	N/A	29	10
OFFICIAL MOTO2 QUALIFYING RESULTS

=== Moto3 ===
Fastest session lap

Pos.	No.	Biker	Constructor	Qualifying times		Final grid	Row
Pos.	No.	Biker	Constructor	Q1	Q2	Final grid	Row
1	5	(Spain) Jaume Masià	Honda	Qualified in Q2	2:25.072	1	1
2	19	(United Kingdom) Scott Ogden	Honda	Qualified in Q2	2:25.435	2	1
3	96	(Spain) Daniel Holgado	KTM	Qualified in Q2	2:25.607	3	1
4	54	(Italy) Riccardo Rossi	Honda	Qualified in Q2	2:25.676	4	2
5	66	(Australia) Joel Kelso	CFMoto	2:26.739	2:25.707	5	2
6	71	(Japan) Ayumu Sasaki	Husqvarna	Qualified in Q2	2:25.890	6	2
7	48	(Spain) Iván Ortolá	KTM	Qualified in Q2	2:25.983	7	3
8	24	(Japan) Tatsuki Suzuki	Honda	Qualified in Q2	2:26.234	8	3
9	82	(Italy) Stefano Nepa	KTM	Qualified in Q2	2:26.255	9	3
10	43	(Spain) Xavier Artigas	CFMoto	2:26.187	2:26.452	10	4
11	7	(Italy) Filippo Farioli	KTM	2:26.740	2:26.651	11	4
12	27	(Japan) Kaito Toba	Honda	Qualified in Q2	2:26.826	12	4
13	55	(Italy) Romano Fenati	Honda	Qualified in Q2	2:26.966	13	5
14	18	(Italy) Matteo Bertelle	Honda	Qualified in Q2	2:27.251	14	5
15	99	(Spain) José Antonio Rueda	KTM	Qualified in Q2	2:27.258	15	5
16	10	(Brazil) Diogo Moreira	KTM	Qualified in Q2	2:27.514	16	6
17	72	(Japan) Taiyo Furusato	Honda	2:26.598	2:27.527	17	6
18	53	(Turkey) Deniz Öncü	KTM	Qualified in Q2	2:28.522	18	6
19	6	(Japan) Ryusei Yamanaka	Gas Gas	2:27.019	N/A	19	7
20	64	(Indonesia) Mario Aji	Honda	2:27.839	N/A	20	7
21	38	(Spain) David Salvador	KTM	2:27.963	N/A	21	7
22	63	(Malaysia) Syarifuddin Azman	KTM	2:28.267	N/A	22	8
23	95	(Netherlands) Collin Veijer	Husqvarna	2:28.968	N/A	23	8
24	70	(United Kingdom) Joshua Whatley	Honda	2:29.404	N/A	24	8
25	20	(France) Lorenzo Fellon	KTM	2:20.471	N/A	25	9
26	22	(Spain) Ana Carrasco	KTM	2:31.889	N/A	26	9
27	44	(Spain) David Muñoz	Honda	2:32.181	N/A	27	9
28	80	(Colombia) David Alonso	Gas Gas	NC	N/A	28	10
OFFICIAL MOTO3 QUALIFYING RESULTS

=== MotoE ===
Fastest session lap

Pos.	No.	Biker	Constructor	Qualifying times		Final grid	Row
Pos.	No.	Biker	Constructor	Q1	Q2	Final grid	Row
1	51	(Brazil) Eric Granado	Ducati	Qualified in Q2	2:10.912	1	1
2	40	(Italy) Mattia Casadei	Ducati	2:10.884	2:11.135	2	1
3	4	(Spain) Héctor Garzó	Ducati	Qualified in Q2	2:11.238	3	1
4	34	(Italy) Kevin Manfredi	Ducati	Qualified in Q2	2:11.461	4	2
5	21	(Italy) Kevin Zannoni	Ducati	Qualified in Q2	2:11.572	5	2
6	3	(Switzerland) Randy Krummenacher	Ducati	Qualified in Q2	2:11.638	6	2
7	29	(Italy) Nicholas Spinelli	Ducati	Qualified in Q2	2:11.702	7	3
8	11	(Italy) Matteo Ferrari	Ducati	Qualified in Q2	NC	8	3
9	81	(Spain) Jordi Torres	Ducati	Qualified in Q2	NC	9	3
10	9	(Italy) Andrea Mantovani	Ducati	2:11.118	NC	10	4
11	61	(Italy) Alessandro Zaccone	Ducati	2:11.524	N/A	11	4
12	53	(Spain) Tito Rabat	Ducati	2:11.821	N/A	12	4
13	72	(Italy) Alessio Finello	Ducati	2:11.981	N/A	13	5
14	23	(Italy) Luca Salvadori	Ducati	2:12.236	N/A	14	5
15	77	(Spain) Miquel Pons	Ducati	2:12.336	N/A	15	5
16	78	(Japan) Hikari Okubo	Ducati	2:12.663	N/A	16	6
17	8	(Spain) Mika Pérez	Ducati	2:12.808	N/A	17	6
18	6	(Spain) María Herrera	Ducati	2:13.981	N/A	18	6
OFFICIAL MOTOE QUALIFYING RESULTS

== MotoGP Sprint ==
The MotoGP Sprint was held on 5 August.

Pos.	No.	Rider	Team	Constructor	Laps	Time/Retired	Grid	Points
1	73	(Spain) Álex Márquez	Gresini Racing MotoGP	Ducati	10	21:52.317	3	12
2	72	(Italy) Marco Bezzecchi	Mooney VR46 Racing Team	Ducati	10	+0.366	1	9
3	12	(Spain) Maverick Viñales	Aprilia Racing	Aprilia	10	+3.374	8	7
4	5	(France) Johann Zarco	Prima Pramac Racing	Ducati	10	+5.671	9	6
5	41	(Spain) Aleix Espargaró	Aprilia Racing	Aprilia	10	+6.068	12	5
6	89	(Spain) Jorge Martín	Prima Pramac Racing	Ducati	10	+7.294	7	4
7	43	(Australia) Jack Miller	Red Bull KTM Factory Racing	KTM	10	+9.415	2	3
8	37	(Spain) Augusto Fernández	GasGas Factory Racing Tech3	KTM	10	+9.850	5	2
9	33	(South Africa) Brad Binder	Red Bull KTM Factory Racing	KTM	10	+10.435	10	1
10	88	(Portugal) Miguel Oliveira	CryptoData RNF MotoGP Team	Aprilia	10	+11.247	16	
11	10	(Italy) Luca Marini	Mooney VR46 Racing Team	Ducati	10	+17.365	6	
12	49	(Italy) Fabio Di Giannantonio	Gresini Racing MotoGP	Ducati	10	+20.063	18	
13	23	(Italy) Enea Bastianini	Ducati Lenovo Team	Ducati	10	+24.352	13	
14	1	(Italy) Francesco Bagnaia	Ducati Lenovo Team	Ducati	10	+25.527	4	
15	21	(Italy) Franco Morbidelli	Monster Energy Yamaha MotoGP	Yamaha	10	+27.191	11	
16	44	(Spain) Pol Espargaró	GasGas Factory Racing Tech3	KTM	10	+27.693	15	
17	36	(Spain) Joan Mir	Repsol Honda Team	Honda	10	+29.062	19	
18	93	(Spain) Marc Márquez	Repsol Honda Team	Honda	10	+29.326	14	
19	25	(Spain) Raúl Fernández	CryptoData RNF MotoGP Team	Aprilia	10	+29.627	20	
20	30	(Japan) Takaaki Nakagami	LCR Honda Idemitsu	Honda	10	+29.909	21	
21	20	(France) Fabio Quartararo	Monster Energy Yamaha MotoGP	Yamaha	10	+30.326	22	
22	27	(Spain) Iker Lecuona	LCR Honda Castrol	Honda	10	+47.674	17	
Fastest sprint lap: (Spain) Álex Marquez (Ducati) – 2:10.415 (lap 3)
OFFICIAL MOTOGP SPRINT REPORT

== Warm up practice ==
=== MotoGP ===
Marco Bezzecchi set the best time 2:10.207 and was the fastest rider at this session ahead of Álex Márquez and Fabio Di Giannantonio.

== Race ==
=== MotoGP ===
Pos.	No.	Rider	Team	Constructor	Laps	Time/Retired	Grid	Points
1	41	(Spain) Aleix Espargaró	Aprilia Racing	Aprilia	20	40:40.367	12	25
2	1	(Italy) Francesco Bagnaia	Ducati Lenovo Team	Ducati	20	+0.215	4	20
3	33	(South Africa) Brad Binder	Red Bull KTM Factory Racing	KTM	20	+0.680	10	16
4	88	(Portugal) Miguel Oliveira	CryptoData RNF MotoGP Team	Aprilia	20	+0.750	16	13
5	12	(Spain) Maverick Viñales	Aprilia Racing	Aprilia	20	+2.101	8	11
6	89	(Spain) Jorge Martín	Prima Pramac Racing	Ducati	20	+7.903	7	10
7	10	(Italy) Luca Marini	Mooney VR46 Racing Team	Ducati	20	+9.099	6	9
8	43	(Australia) Jack Miller	Red Bull KTM Factory Racing	KTM	20	+9.298	2	8
9	5	(France) Johann Zarco	Prima Pramac Racing	Ducati	20	+9.958	9	7
10	25	(Spain) Raúl Fernández	CryptoData RNF MotoGP Team	Aprilia	20	+19.947	20	6
11	37	(Spain) Augusto Fernández	GasGas Factory Racing Tech3	KTM	20	+20.296	5	5
12	44	(Spain) Pol Espargaró	GasGas Factory Racing Tech3	KTM	20	+1:06.120	15	4
13	49	(Italy) Fabio Di Giannantonio	Gresini Racing MotoGP	Ducati	20	+1:27.605	18	3
14	21	(Italy) Franco Morbidelli	Monster Energy Yamaha MotoGP	Yamaha	20	+1:28.913	11	2
15	20	(France) Fabio Quartararo	Monster Energy Yamaha MotoGP	Yamaha	20	+1:29.075	22	1
16	30	(Japan) Takaaki Nakagami	LCR Honda Idemitsu	Honda	20	+1:38.573	21	
17	27	(Spain) Iker Lecuona	LCR Honda Castrol	Honda	20	+1:49.674	17	
Ret	23	(Italy) Enea Bastianini	Ducati Lenovo Team	Ducati	16	Accident	13	
Ret	93	(Spain) Marc Márquez	Repsol Honda Team	Honda	14	Collision	14	
Ret	72	(Italy) Marco Bezzecchi	Mooney VR46 Racing Team	Ducati	5	Accident	1	
Ret	73	(Spain) Álex Márquez	Gresini Racing MotoGP	Ducati	5	Retired	3	
Ret	36	(Spain) Joan Mir	Repsol Honda Team	Honda	2	Accident	19	
Fastest lap: (Spain) Aleix Espargaró (Aprilia) – 2:00.208 (lap 7)
OFFICIAL MOTOGP RACE REPORT

=== Moto2 ===
Pos.	No.	Rider	Constructor	Laps	Time/Retired	Grid	Points
1	54	(Spain) Fermín Aldeguer	Boscoscuro	17	35:37.758	2	25
2	40	(Spain) Arón Canet	Kalex	17	+2.546	6	20
3	37	(Spain) Pedro Acosta	Kalex	17	+3.883	1	16
4	16	(United States) Joe Roberts	Kalex	17	+6.460	10	13
5	18	(Spain) Manuel González	Kalex	17	+7.162	17	11
6	7	(Belgium) Barry Baltus	Kalex	17	+7.574	8	10
7	22	(United Kingdom) Sam Lowes	Kalex	17	+7.623	9	9
8	79	(Japan) Ai Ogura	Kalex	17	+9.138	16	8
9	35	(Thailand) Somkiat Chantra	Kalex	17	+12.280	14	7
10	14	(Italy) Tony Arbolino	Kalex	17	+13.094	4	6
11	52	(Spain) Jeremy Alcoba	Kalex	17	+16.571	19	5
12	13	(Italy) Celestino Vietti	Kalex	17	+16.708	12	4
13	12	(Czech Republic) Filip Salač	Kalex	17	+16.828	11	3
14	75	(Spain) Albert Arenas	Kalex	17	+18.835	18	2
15	15	(South Africa) Darryn Binder	Kalex	17	+29.061	13	1
16	3	(Germany) Lukas Tulovic	Kalex	17	+29.556	23	
17	64	(Netherlands) Bo Bendsneyder	Kalex	17	+38.437	26	
18	17	(Spain) Álex Escrig	Forward	17	+40.838	28	
19	24	(Spain) Marcos Ramírez	Forward	17	+42.853	25	
20	84	(Netherlands) Zonta van den Goorbergh	Kalex	17	+45.139	3	
21	28	(Spain) Izan Guevara	Kalex	17	+1:05.750	20	
22	5	(Japan) Kohta Nozane	Kalex	17	+1:10.688	27	
Ret	21	(Spain) Alonso López	Boscoscuro	7	Accident	5	
Ret	11	(Spain) Sergio García	Kalex	3	Accident	7	
Ret	96	(United Kingdom) Jake Dixon	Kalex	0	Accident	15	
Ret	33	(United Kingdom) Rory Skinner	Kalex	0	Collision	21	
Ret	23	(Japan) Taiga Hada	Kalex	0	Collision	22	
Ret	72	(Spain) Borja Gómez	Kalex	0	Collision	24	
Ret	71	(Italy) Dennis Foggia	Kalex	0	Collision	29	
Fastest lap: (Spain) Fermín Aldeguer (Boscoscuro) – 2:04.956 (lap 16)
OFFICIAL MOTO2 RACE REPORT

=== Moto3 ===
Pos.	No.	Rider	Constructor	Laps	Time/Retired	Grid	Points
1	80	(Colombia) David Alonso	Gas Gas	15	33:35.396	28	25
2	71	(Japan) Ayumu Sasaki	Husqvarna	15	+0.152	7	20
3	96	(Spain) Daniel Holgado	KTM	15	+0.203	3	16
4	48	(Spain) Iván Ortolá	KTM	15	+0.337	8	13
5	44	(Spain) David Muñoz	KTM	15	+0.471	27	11
6	38	(Spain) David Salvador	KTM	15	+0.839	21	10
7 (Note: One-position penalty for exceeding track limits on the final lap.)	10	(Brazil) Diogo Moreira	KTM	15	+0.767	17	9
8	99	(Spain) José Antonio Rueda	KTM	15	+0.892	16	8
9	95	(Netherlands) Collin Veijer	Husqvarna	15	+0.941	23	7
10	55	(Italy) Romano Fenati	Honda	15	+0.977	14	6
11	53	(Turkey) Deniz Öncü	KTM	15	+1.140	9	5
12	82	(Italy) Stefano Nepa	KTM	15	+1.227	11	4
13	54	(Italy) Riccardo Rossi	Honda	15	+1.331	4	3
14	27	(Japan) Kaito Toba	Honda	15	+1.386	13	2
15	6	(Japan) Ryusei Yamanaka	Gas Gas	15	+1.572	19	1
16	66	(Australia) Joel Kelso	CFMoto	15	+2.270	5	
17	19	(United Kingdom) Scott Ogden	Honda	15	+1.902	2	
18	5	(Spain) Jaume Masià	Honda	15	+11.314	1	
19	7	(Italy) Filippo Farioli	KTM	15	+14.167	12	
20	72	(Japan) Taiyo Furusato	Honda	15	+14.274	18	
21	43	(Spain) Xavier Artigas	CFMoto	15	+17.646	6	
22	64	(Indonesia) Mario Aji	Honda	15	+17.825	20	
23	22	(Spain) Ana Carrasco	KTM	15	+17.986	26	
24	20	(France) Lorenzo Fellon	KTM	15	+20.763 (Note: Three-second penalty for exceeding track limits.)	25	
25	70	(United Kingdom) Joshua Whatley	Honda	15	+28.774	24	
Ret	63	(Malaysia) Syarifuddin Azman	KTM	13	Retired	22	
Ret	24	(Japan) Tatsuki Suzuki	Honda	12	Accident Damage	10	
Ret	18	(Italy) Matteo Bertelle	Honda	11	Accident	15	
Fastest lap: (Netherlands) Collin Veijer (Husqvarna) – 2:12.869 (lap 5)
OFFICIAL MOTO3 RACE REPORT

=== MotoE ===
==== Race 1 ====
The race, scheduled to be run for six laps, was shortened to five laps.

Pos.	No.	Rider	Laps	Time/Retired	Grid	Points
1	3	(Switzerland) Randy Krummenacher	5	12:17.994	6	25
2	34	(Italy) Kevin Manfredi	5	+0.142	4	20
3	51	(Brazil) Eric Granado	5	+1.089	1	16
4	4	(Spain) Héctor Garzó	5	+1.376	3	13
5	81	(Spain) Jordi Torres	5	+1.639	9	11
6	40	(Italy) Mattia Casadei	5	+2.586	2	10
7	77	(Spain) Miquel Pons	5	+9.574	15	9
8	11	(Italy) Matteo Ferrari	5	+13.254	8	8
9	8	(Spain) Mika Pérez	5	+13.706	17	7
10	9	(Italy) Andrea Mantovani	5	+13.961	10	6
11	53	(Spain) Tito Rabat	5	+15.682	12	5
12	78	(Japan) Hikari Okubo	5	+17.361	16	4
13 (Note: One-position penalty for a yellow flag infringement.)	21	(Italy) Kevin Zannoni	5	+16.466	5	3
14	72	(Italy) Alessio Finello	5	+32.174	13	2
15	6	(Spain) María Herrera	5	+1:03.235	18	1
Ret	29	(Italy) Nicholas Spinelli	4	Accident	7	
Ret	23	(Italy) Luca Salvadori	4	Accident	14	
Ret	61	(Italy) Alessandro Zaccone	2	Accident	11	
Fastest lap: (Italy) Kevin Manfredi – 2:23.581 (lap 5)
OFFICIAL MOTOE RACE NR.1 REPORT

- All bikes manufactured by Ducati.

==== Race 2 ====
Pos.	No.	Rider	Laps	Time/Retired	Grid	Points
1	40	(Italy) Mattia Casadei	6	14:07.906	2	25
2	51	(Brazil) Eric Granado	6	+1.108	1	20
3	29	(Italy) Nicholas Spinelli	6	+6.776	7	16
4	81	(Spain) Jordi Torres	6	+6.909	9	13
5	4	(Spain) Héctor Garzó	6	+7.724	3	11
6	9	(Italy) Andrea Mantovani	6	+9.115	10	10
7	11	(Italy) Matteo Ferrari	6	+10.359 (Note: Three-second penalty for irresponsible riding.)	8	9
8	78	(Japan) Hikari Okubo	6	+19.483	16	8
9	34	(Italy) Kevin Manfredi	6	+19.776	4	7
10	8	(Spain) Mika Pérez	6	+19.846	17	6
11	23	(Italy) Luca Salvadori	6	+21.056	14	5
12	72	(Italy) Alessio Finello	6	+1:05.854	13	4
13	6	(Spain) María Herrera	6	+1:06.501	18	3
Ret	21	(Italy) Kevin Zannoni	0	Accident	5	
Ret	3	(Switzerland) Randy Krummenacher	0	Accident	6	
Ret	61	(Italy) Alessandro Zaccone	0	Accident	11	
Ret	53	(Spain) Tito Rabat	0	Accident	12	
Ret	77	(Spain) Miquel Pons	0	Accident	15	
Fastest lap: (Italy) Mattia Casadei – 2:19.327 (lap 5)
OFFICIAL MOTOE RACE NR.2 REPORT

- All bikes manufactured by Ducati.

== Championship standings after the race ==
Below are the standings for the top five riders, constructors, and teams after the round.

=== MotoGP ===
Riders' Championship standings

Pos.	Rider	Points
1	(Italy) Francesco Bagnaia	214
2	(Spain) Jorge Martín	173
3	(Italy) Marco Bezzecchi	167
4	(South Africa) Brad Binder	131
5	(France) Johann Zarco	122

Constructors' Championship standings

Pos.	Constructor	Points
1	(Italy) Ducati	317
2	(Austria) KTM	172
3	(Italy) Aprilia	153
4	(Japan) Honda	89
5	(Japan) Yamaha	84

Teams' Championship standings

Pos.	Team	Points
1	(Italy) Prima Pramac Racing	295
2	(Italy) Mooney VR46 Racing Team	274
3	(Italy) Ducati Lenovo Team	242
4	(Austria) Red Bull KTM Factory Racing	221
5	(Italy) Aprilia Racing	181

=== Moto2 ===
Riders' Championship standings

	Pos.	Rider	Points
1	1	(Spain) Pedro Acosta	156
1	2	(Italy) Tony Arbolino	154
	3	(United Kingdom) Jake Dixon	104
1	4	(Spain) Arón Canet	96
1	5	(Spain) Alonso López	92

Constructors' Championship standings

Pos.	Constructor	Points
1	(Germany) Kalex	220
2	(Italy) Boscoscuro	124

Teams' Championship standings

	Pos.	Team	Points
	1	(Belgium) Elf Marc VDS Racing Team	221
	2	(Finland) Red Bull KTM Ajo	199
	3	(Italy) Beta Tools Speed Up	166
	4	(Spain) Pons Wegow Los40	133
2	5	(Japan) Idemitsu Honda Team Asia	105

=== Moto3 ===
Riders' Championship standings

	Pos.	Rider	Points
	1	(Spain) Daniel Holgado	141
1	2	(Japan) Ayumu Sasaki	119
1	3	(Spain) Jaume Masià	109
	4	(Spain) Iván Ortolá	107
	5	(Turkey) Deniz Öncü	99

Constructors' Championship standings

Pos.	Constructor	Points
1	(Austria) KTM	202
2	(Japan) Honda	140
3	(Sweden) Husqvarna	122
4	(Spain) Gas Gas	98
5	(China) CFMoto	62

Teams' Championship standings

	Pos.	Team	Points
1	1	(Finland) Red Bull KTM Ajo	159
1	2	(Italy) Angeluss MTA Team	157
2	3	(Germany) Liqui Moly Husqvarna Intact GP	153
3	4	(Luxembourg) Leopard Racing	147
1	5	(France) Red Bull KTM Tech3	143

=== MotoE ===
Riders' Championship standings

	Pos.	Rider	Points
	1	(Spain) Jordi Torres	168
	2	(Italy) Matteo Ferrari	153
2	3	(Italy) Mattia Casadei	124
	4	(Switzerland) Randy Krummenacher	123
2	5	(Spain) Héctor Garzó	122

Teams' Championship standings

	Pos.	Team	Points
	1	(Germany) Dynavolt Intact GP MotoE	245
2	2	(Spain) HP Pons Los40	200
	3	(Spain) Openbank Aspar Team	181
2	4	(Italy) Felo Gresini MotoE	179
1	5	(Monaco) LCR E-Team	156

== Notes ==
Previous race: 2023 Dutch TT	FIM Grand Prix World Championship; 2023 season	Next race: 2023 Austrian Grand Prix
Previous race: 2022 British Grand Prix	British motorcycle Grand Prix	Next race: 2024 British Grand Prix
