= Matteo Ferrari (motorcyclist) =

Italian motorcycle racer (born 1997)

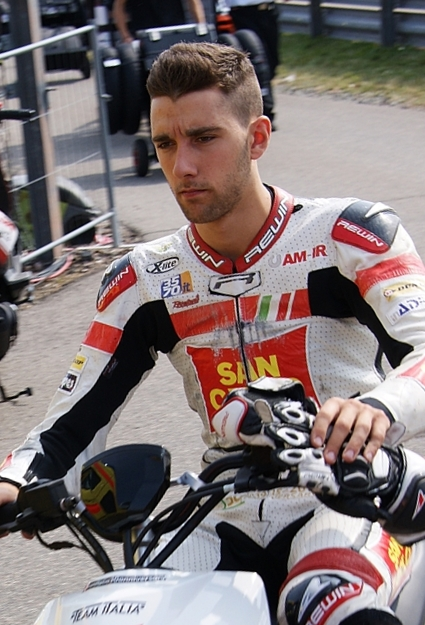
- Ferrari in 2015
- Nationality: Italian
- Born: 12 February 1997 (age 29); Cesena, Italy
- Current team: WRP Racing
- Bike number: 11
Motorcycle racing career statistics
Moto2 World Championship
Active years	2024, 2026
Manufacturers	Kalex
2024 championship position	30th (1 pts)
Starts / Wins / Podiums / Poles / F. laps / Points; 5 / 0 / 0 / 0 / 0 / 1
Moto3 World Championship
Active years	2013–2015
Manufacturers	FTR Honda, Mahindra
Championships	0
2015 championship position	33rd (1 pt)
Starts / Wins / Podiums / Poles / F. laps / Points; 47 / 0 / 0 / 0 / 0 / 15
MotoE World Championship
Active years	2019–2025
Manufacturers	Energica, Ducati
Championships	1 (2019)
2025 championship position	3rd (168 pts)
Starts / Wins / Podiums / Poles / F. laps / Points; 78 / 13 / 25 / 6 / 10 / 960.5
Superbike World Championship
Active years	2020
Manufacturers	Ducati
Championships	0
2020 championship position	23rd (5 pts)
Starts / Wins / Podiums / Poles / F. laps / Points; 6 / 0 / 0 / 0 / 0 / 5
Supersport World Championship
Active years	2025–
Manufacturers	Ducati
Championships	0
2025 championship position	29th (3 pts)
Starts / Wins / Podiums / Poles / F. laps / Points; 28 / 0 / 3 / 0 / 0 / 176

Matteo Ferrari (born 12 February 1997) is an Italian motorcycle racer. He currently competes in the 2026 Supersport World Championship aboard a Ducati Panigale V2. He was the first MotoE World Cup Winner in 2019, and was the European Moto3 Champion in 2012.

== Career statistics ==
=== Career highlights ===
- 2013 - NC, European senior Cup, Honda CBR500R
- 2016 - 21st, FIM Superstock 1000 Cup, BMW S1000RR
- 2017 - 17th, European Superstock 1000 Championship, Kawasaki ZX-10R
- 2018 - 12th, European Superstock 1000 Championship, Ducati 1199 Panigale R

=== European senior Cup ===
Year	Bike	1	2	3	4	5	6	7	8	Pos	Pts
2013	Honda	ARA	NED	MON; DNS	IMO	SIL	NÜR	MAG	JER	NC	0

=== Superstock 1000 Cup ===
==== Races by year ====
(key) (Races in bold indicate pole position) (Races in italics indicate fastest lap)

Year	Bike	1	2	3	4	5	6	7	8	Pos	Pts
2016	BMW	ARA	NED	IMO; 10	DON	MIS; 7	LAU	MAG	JER	21st	15

=== European Superstock 1000 Championship ===
==== Races by year ====
(key) (Races in bold indicate pole position) (Races in italics indicate fastest lap)

Year	Bike	1	2	3	4	5	6	7	8	9	Pos	Pts
2017	Kawasaki	ARA	NED	IMO; 5	DON	MIS; 12	LAU	ALG	MAG	JER	17th	15
2018	Ducati	ARA	NED	IMO; 1	DON	BRN	MIS; Ret	ALG	MAG		12th	25

=== Italian Superbike Championship (CIV) ===
==== Races by year ====
(key)

Year	Class	Bike	1		2		3		4		5		6		Pos	Pts
Year	Class	Bike	R1	R2	R1	R2	R1	R2	R1	R2	R1	R2	R1	R2	Pos	Pts
2017	SBK	BMW	IMO1; 7	IMO2; 8	MIS1; 12	MIS2; 4	MUG1; 8	MUG2; 9	MIS1; 6	MIS2; 3	MUG1; 9	MUG2; 8	VAL1; 3	VAL2; 3	4th	122
2018	SBK	Ducati	MIS1; 2	MIS2; 2	MUG1; 2	MUG2; 2	IMO1; 3	IMO2; 1	MIS1; 5	MIS2; 6	MUG1; 2	MUG2; 1	VAL1; Ret	VAL2; 7	2nd	196

=== FIM CEV Moto2 European Championship ===
==== By year ====
(key) (Races in bold indicate pole position, races in italics indicate fastest lap)

Year	Bike	1	2	3	4	5	6	7	8	9	10	11	Pos	Pts
2019	Kalex	EST1; 7	EST2; 11	VAL; 6	CAT1	CAT2	ARA1; 12	ARA2; 8	JER; Ret	ALB1	ALB2	VAL; 6	13th	46

=== Grand Prix motorcycle racing ===
==== By season ====
Season	Class	Motorcycle	Team	Race	Win	Podium	Pole	FLap	Pts	Plcd	WCh
2013	Moto3	FTR Honda M313	Ongetta-Centro Seta	16	0	0	0	0	2	27th	–
2014	Moto3	Mahindra MGP3O	San Carlo Team Italia	18	0	0	0	0	12	22nd	–
2015	Moto3	Mahindra MGP3O	San Carlo Team Italia	13	0	0	0	0	1	33rd	–
2019	MotoE	Energica Ego Corsa	Trentino Gresini MotoE	6	2	3	0	1	99	**1st**	1
2020	MotoE	Energica Ego Corsa	Trentino Gresini MotoE	7	2	4	1	0	97	**2nd**	–
2021	MotoE	Energica Ego Corsa	Indonesian E-Racing Gresini MotoE	7	1	1	0	1	86	**3rd**	–
2022	MotoE	Energica Ego Corsa	Felo Gresini MotoE	12	2	5	0	2	162.5	**3rd**	–
2023	MotoE	Ducati V21L	Felo Gresini MotoE	16	3	7	4	3	216	**3rd**	–
2023	Moto2	Kalex	QJmotor Gresini Moto2	1	0	0	0	0	0	38th	–
2024	MotoE	Ducati V21L	Felo Gresini MotoE	16	0	0	0	1	132	8th	–
2024	Moto2	Kalex	QJmotor Gresini Moto2	2	0	0	0	0	1	30th	–
2025	MotoE	Ducati V21L	Felo Gresini MotoE	14	3	5	1	2	168	**3rd**	–
2026	Moto2	Kalex	Italjet Gresini Moto2	2	0	0	0	0	0*	34th*	–
Total				**130**	**13**	**25**	**6**	**10**	**956.5**		**1**

==== By class ====
Class	Seasons	1st GP	1st pod	1st win	Race	Win	Podiums	Pole	FLap	Pts	WChmp
Moto3	2013–2015	2013 Qatar			47	0	0	0	0	15	0
MotoE	2019–present	2019 Germany	2019 San Marino Race 1	2019 San Marino Race 1	78	13	25	6	10	940.5	1
Moto2	2024	2024 Spanish			5	0	0	0	0	1	0
Total	2013–present				**130**	**13**	**25**	**6**	**10**	**956.5**	**1**

==== Races by year ====
(key) (Races in bold indicate pole position, races in italics indicate fastest lap)

Year	Class	Bike	1	2	3	4	5	6	7	8	9	10	11	12	13	14	15	16	17	18	19	20	21	22	Pos	Pts
2013	Moto3	FTR Honda	QAT; 24	AME; 19	SPA; 21	FRA; 17	ITA; Ret	CAT; 24	NED; 27	GER; 20	INP; 15	CZE; 20	GBR; 17	RSM; Ret	ARA; Ret	MAL; Ret	AUS; DNS	JPN; Ret	VAL; 15						27th	2
2014	Moto3	Mahindra	QAT; Ret	AME; Ret	ARG; Ret	SPA; 25	FRA; 21	ITA; 14	CAT; 21	NED; 13	GER; 9	INP; Ret	CZE; 20	GBR; 24	RSM; Ret	ARA; Ret	JPN; 24	AUS; 24	MAL; Ret	VAL; 25					22nd	12
2015	Moto3	Mahindra	QAT; 21	AME; 15	ARG; 21	SPA; 18	FRA; Ret	ITA; 24	CAT; 21	NED; 24	GER; 25	INP; 29	CZE; 21	GBR; Ret	RSM; 23	ARA	JPN	AUS	MAL	VAL					33rd	1
2019	MotoE	Energica	GER; 5	AUT; 5	RSM1; 1	RSM2; 1	VAL1; 3	VAL2; 5																	1st	99
2020	MotoE	Energica	SPA; 2	ANC; Ret	**RSM**; 1	EMI1; 3	EMI2; 1	FRA1; Ret	FRA2; 5																2nd	97
2021	MotoE	Energica	SPA; 6	FRA; 8	CAT; 7	NED; 4	AUT; 8	RSM1; 4	RSM2; 1																3rd	86
2022	MotoE	Energica	SPA1; 3	SPA2; 6	FRA1; 4	FRA2; 7	ITA1; 2	ITA2; 1	NED1; 4	NED2; 4^{‡}	AUT1; 14	AUT2; 9	RSM1; 3	RSM2; 1											3rd	162.5
2023	MotoE	Ducati	**FRA1**; Ret	**FRA2**; 1	**ITA1**; 2	**ITA2**; 3	GER1; 4	GER2; 7	NED1; 1	NED2; 1	GBR1; 8	GBR2; 7	AUT1; 16	AUT2; 2	CAT1; 4	CAT2; 5	RSM1; 6	RSM2; 7							3rd	216
2023	Moto2	Kalex	POR	ARG	AME	SPA	FRA	ITA	GER	NED	GBR	AUT	CAT	RSM	IND	JPN	INA	AUS	THA	MAL	QAT	VAL; 19			38th	0
2024	MotoE	Ducati	POR1; 12	POR2; 8	FRA1; 8	FRA2; 8	CAT1; 8	CAT2; 8	ITA1; 8	ITA2; 7	NED1; 5	NED2; 9	GER1; 4	GER2; 6	AUT1; Ret	AUT2; 6	RSM1; 6	RSM2; 6							8th	132
2024	Moto2	Kalex	QAT	POR	AME	SPA; 15	FRA	CAT	ITA	NED	GER	GBR	AUT	ARA	RSM	EMI; Ret	INA	JPN	AUS	THA	MAL	SLD			30th	1
2025	MotoE	Ducati	FRA1; Ret	FRA2; Ret	NED1; 5	NED2; 12	**AUT1**; 1	**AUT2**; 1	HUN1; 4	HUN2; 3	CAT1; 3	CAT2; 14	RSM1; 5	RSM2; 1	POR1; 6	POR2; 6									3rd	168
2026	Moto2	Kalex	THA	BRA	USA	SPA	FRA	CAT	ITA	HUN	CZE	NED	GER	GBR	ARA	RSM	AUT	JPN	INA	AUS	MAL; 22	QAT; 23	POR	VAL	34th*	0*

^{‡} Half points awarded as less than two thirds of the race distance (but at least three full laps) was completed.
* Season still in progress.

=== Superbike World Championship ===
==== Races by year ====
(key) (Races in bold indicate pole position, races in italics indicate fastest lap)

Year	Bike	1			2			3			4			5			6			7			8			Pos	Pts
Year	Bike	R1	SR	R2	R1	SR	R2	R1	SR	R2	R1	SR	R2	R1	SR	R2	R1	SR	R2	R1	SR	R2	R1	SR	R2	Pos	Pts
2020	Ducati	AUS	AUS	AUS	SPA	SPA	SPA	POR	POR	POR	SPA	SPA	SPA	SPA; 14	SPA; 18	SPA; 14	SPA	SPA	SPA	FRA	FRA	FRA	POR; Ret	POR; 15	POR; 15	23rd	5

=== Supersport World Championship ===
==== By year ====
(key) (Races in bold indicate pole position; races in italics indicate fastest lap)

Year	Bike	1		2		3		4		5		6		7		8		9		10		11		12		Pos	Pts
Year	Bike	R1	R2	R1	R2	R1	R2	R1	R2	R1	R2	R1	R2	R1	R2	R1	R2	R1	R2	R1	R2	R1	R2	R1	R2	Pos	Pts
2025	Ducati	AUS	AUS	POR	POR	NED	NED	ITA	ITA	CZE	CZE	EMI	EMI	GBR	GBR	HUN	HUN	FRA	FRA	ARA	ARA	EST; Ret	EST; 19	SPA; 13	SPA; 16	29th	3
2026	Ducati	AUS; 6	AUS; 3	POR; 17	POR; 15	NED; 14	NED; 13	HUN; 5	HUN; 4	CZE; 7	CZE; 5	ARA; 7	ARA; 3	EMI; Ret	EMI; 7	GBR; 15	GBR; 13	FRA; 11	FRA; 14	ITA; 6	ITA; 9	EST; Ret	EST; 7	SPA; 6	SPA; 3	9th	173

=== CIV National 600 ===
==== Races by year ====
(key) (Races in bold indicate pole position; races in italics indicate fastest lap)

Year	Bike	1		2		3		4		5		6		Pos	Pts
Year	Bike	R1	R2	R1	R2	R1	R2	R1	R2	R1	R2	R1	R2	Pos	Pts
2022	Ducati	MIS; 5	MIS; 8	VAL; 6	VAL; 8	MUG; 3	MUG; 3	MIS2; 4	MIS2; 3	**MUG2**; 2	**MUG2**; C	IMO; 1	IMO; 4	3rd	156

=== FIM Endurance World Cup ===
Year	Team	Bike	Tyre	Rider	Pts	TC
2025	(Italy) Aviobike WRS	Ducati Panigale V4	**D**	(Italy) Matteo Ferrari (San Marino) Luca Bernardi (Italy) Alberto Butti (Japan) Akito Haga	11	31st
