= 2023 Italian motorcycle Grand Prix =

Motorcycle races in Scarperia e San Piero

(Italy) 2023 Italian Grand Prix
Race details
- Race 6 of 20 races in the 2023 Grand Prix motorcycle racing season
- Date: 10–11 June 2023
- Official name: Gran Premio d'Italia Oakley
- Location: Autodromo Internazionale del Mugello; Scarperia e San Piero, Italy
- Course: Permanent racing facility; 5.245 km (3.259 mi)

MotoGP
Pole position
Rider	(Italy) Francesco Bagnaia	Ducati
Time	1:44.855	
Fastest lap
Rider	(Spain) Álex Márquez (Note: Bagnaia and Álex Márquez recorded the same fastest lap time during the race, and per FIM rules, Alex Márquez got it because he has second best lap time among them.)	Ducati
Time	1:46.807 on lap 5	
Podium
First	(Italy) Francesco Bagnaia	Ducati
Second	(Spain) Jorge Martín	Ducati
Third	(France) Johann Zarco	Ducati

Moto2
Pole position
Rider	(Spain) Arón Canet	Kalex
Time	1:50.796	
Fastest lap
Rider	(Spain) Pedro Acosta	Kalex
Time	1:51.345 on lap 3	
Podium
First	(Spain) Pedro Acosta	Kalex
Second	(Italy) Tony Arbolino	Kalex
Third	(United Kingdom) Jake Dixon	Kalex

Moto3
Pole position
Rider	(Turkey) Deniz Öncü	KTM
Time	1:56.020	
Fastest lap
Rider	(Japan) Ayumu Sasaki	Husqvarna
Time	1:56.298 on lap 4	
Podium
First	(Spain) Daniel Holgado	KTM
Second	(Turkey) Deniz Öncü	KTM
Third	(Japan) Ayumu Sasaki	Husqvarna

MotoE Race 1
Pole position
Rider	(Italy) Matteo Ferrari	Ducati
Time	1:55.752	
Fastest lap
Rider	(Italy) Matteo Ferrari	Ducati
Time	1:55.727 on lap 2	
Podium
First	(Italy) Andrea Mantovani	Ducati
Second	(Italy) Matteo Ferrari	Ducati
Third	(Italy) Mattia Casadei	Ducati

MotoE Race 2
Pole position
Rider	(Italy) Matteo Ferrari	Ducati
Time	1:55.752	
Fastest lap
Rider	(Brazil) Eric Granado	Ducati
Time	2:13.123 on lap 5	
Podium
First	(Brazil) Eric Granado	Ducati
Second	(Italy) Kevin Manfredi	Ducati
Third	(Italy) Matteo Ferrari	Ducati

The 2023 Italian motorcycle Grand Prix (officially known as the Gran Premio d'Italia Oakley) was the sixth round of the 2023 Grand Prix motorcycle racing season and the second round of the 2023 MotoE World Championship. All races (except for both MotoE races which were held on 10 June) were held at the Autodromo Internazionale del Mugello in Scarperia e San Piero on 11 June 2023.

== Qualifying ==
=== MotoGP ===
Fastest session lap

Pos.	No.	Biker	Constructor	Qualifying times		Final grid	Row
Pos.	No.	Biker	Constructor	Q1	Q2	Final grid	Row
1	1	(Italy) Francesco Bagnaia	Ducati	Qualified in Q2	1'44.855	1	1
2	93	(Spain) Marc Márquez	Honda	Qualified in Q2	1'44.933	2	1
3	73	(Spain) Álex Márquez	Ducati	1'45.231	1'45.007	3	1
4	10	(Italy) Luca Marini	Ducati	Qualified in Q2	1'45.079	4	2
5	43	(Australia) Jack Miller	KTM	1'45.559	1'45.186	5	2
6	89	(Spain) Jorge Martín	Ducati	Qualified in Q2	1'45.268	6	2
7	72	(Italy) Marco Bezzecchi	Ducati	Qualified in Q2	1'45.290	7	3
8	41	(Spain) Aleix Espargaró	Aprilia	Qualified in Q2	1'45.380	8	3
9	5	(France) Johann Zarco	Ducati	Qualified in Q2	1'45.627	9	3
10	42	(Spain) Álex Rins	Honda	Qualified in Q2	1'45.702	10	4
11	33	(South Africa) Brad Binder	KTM	Qualified in Q2	1'45.731	11	4
12	23	(Italy) Enea Bastianini	Ducati	Qualified in Q2	1'46.884	12	4
13	12	(Spain) Maverick Viñales	Aprilia	1'45.591	N/A	13	5
14	21	(Italy) Franco Morbidelli	Yamaha	1'45.754	N/A	14	5
15	20	(France) Fabio Quartararo	Yamaha	1'45.755	N/A	15	5
16	30	(Japan) Takaaki Nakagami	Honda	1'45.860	N/A	16	6
17	51	(Italy) Michele Pirro	Ducati	1'46.002	N/A	17	6
18	88	(Portugal) Miguel Oliveira	Aprilia	1'46.003	N/A	18	6
19	49	(Italy) Fabio Di Giannantonio	Ducati	1'46.170	N/A	19	7
20	25	(Spain) Raúl Fernández	Aprilia	1'46.347	N/A	20	7
21	37	(Spain) Augusto Fernández	KTM	1'46.359	N/A	21	7
22	32	(Italy) Lorenzo Savadori	Aprilia	1'47.244	N/A	22	8
23	94	(Germany) Jonas Folger	KTM	1'47.806	N/A	23	8
OFFICIAL MOTOGP QUALIFYING RESULTS

== MotoGP Sprint ==
The MotoGP Sprint was held on 10 June.

Pos.	No.	Rider	Team	Constructor	Laps	Time/Retired	Grid	Points
1	1	(Italy) Francesco Bagnaia	Ducati Lenovo Team	Ducati	11	19:41.183	1	12
2	72	(Italy) Marco Bezzecchi	Mooney VR46 Racing Team	Ducati	11	+0.369	6	9
3	89	(Spain) Jorge Martín	Prima Pramac Racing	Ducati	11	+0.952	5	7
4	5	(France) Johann Zarco	Prima Pramac Racing	Ducati	11	+1.009	8	6
5	10	(Italy) Luca Marini	Mooney VR46 Racing Team	Ducati	11	+3.668	4	5
6	43	(Australia) Jack Miller	Red Bull KTM Factory Racing	KTM	11	+3.772	5	4
7	93	(Spain) Marc Márquez	Repsol Honda Team	Honda	11	+3.905	2	3
8	41	(Spain) Aleix Espargaró	Aprilia Racing	Aprilia	11	+6.062	8	2
9	23	(Italy) Enea Bastianini	Ducati Lenovo Team	Ducati	11	+6.431	12	1
10	20	(France) Fabio Quartararo	Monster Energy Yamaha MotoGP	Yamaha	11	+6.458	15	
11	33	(South Africa) Brad Binder	Red Bull KTM Factory Racing	KTM	11	+6.672	11	
12	88	(Portugal) Miguel Oliveira	CryptoData RNF MotoGP Team	Aprilia	11	+7.930	18	
13	12	(Spain) Maverick Viñales	Aprilia Racing	Aprilia	11	+9.002	13	
14	49	(Italy) Fabio Di Giannantonio	Gresini Racing MotoGP	Ducati	11	+11.508	19	
15	51	(Italy) Michele Pirro	Aruba.it Racing	Ducati	11	+14.344	17	
16	21	(Italy) Franco Morbidelli	Monster Energy Yamaha MotoGP	Yamaha	11	+16.666	14	
17	30	(Japan) Takaaki Nakagami	LCR Honda Idemitsu	Honda	11	+16.725	16	
18	32	(Italy) Lorenzo Savadori	Aprilia Racing	Aprilia	11	+17.247	22	
19	25	(Spain) Raúl Fernández	CryptoData RNF MotoGP Team	Aprilia	11	+21.596	20	
20	37	(Spain) Augusto Fernández	GasGas Factory Racing Tech3	KTM	11	+35.212	21	
21	94	(Germany) Jonas Folger	GasGas Factory Racing Tech3	KTM	11	+46.189	23	
Ret	42	(Spain) Álex Rins	LCR Honda Castrol	Honda	3	Accident	10	
Ret	73	(Spain) Álex Márquez	Gresini Racing MotoGP	Ducati	0	Collision	3	
DNS	36	(Spain) Joan Mir	Repsol Honda Team	Honda		Did not start		
Fastest sprint lap: (Italy) Francesco Bagnaia (Ducati) – 1:46.187 (lap 7)
OFFICIAL MOTOGP SPRINT REPORT

- Joan Mir suffered a right hand injury in a crash during practice and was declared unfit to compete for the rest of the weekend.

== Race ==
=== MotoGP ===
Pos.	No.	Rider	Team	Constructor	Laps	Time/Retired	Grid	Points
1	1	(Italy) Francesco Bagnaia	Ducati Lenovo Team	Ducati	23	41:16.863	1	25
2	89	(Spain) Jorge Martín	Prima Pramac Racing	Ducati	23	+1.067	5	20
3	5	(France) Johann Zarco	Prima Pramac Racing	Ducati	23	+1.977	9	16
4	10	(Italy) Luca Marini	Mooney VR46 Racing Team	Ducati	23	+4.625	3	13
5	33	(South Africa) Brad Binder	Red Bull KTM Factory Racing	KTM	23	+8.925	10	11
6	41	(Spain) Aleix Espargaró	Aprilia Racing	Aprilia	23	+10.908	8	10
7	43	(Australia) Jack Miller	Red Bull KTM Factory Racing	KTM	23	+10.999	4	9
8	72	(Italy) Marco Bezzecchi	Mooney VR46 Racing Team	Ducati	23	+12.654	7	8
9	23	(Italy) Enea Bastianini	Ducati Lenovo Team	Ducati	23	+17.102	11	7
10	21	(Italy) Franco Morbidelli	Monster Energy Yamaha MotoGP	Yamaha	23	+17.610	13	6
11	20	(France) Fabio Quartararo	Monster Energy Yamaha MotoGP	Yamaha	23	+17.861	14	5
12	12	(Spain) Maverick Viñales	Aprilia Racing	Aprilia	23	+19.110	12	4
13	30	(Japan) Takaaki Nakagami	LCR Honda Idemitsu	Honda	23	+21.947	15	3
14	49	(Italy) Fabio Di Giannantonio	Gresini Racing MotoGP	Ducati	23	+25.906	18	2
15	37	(Spain) Augusto Fernández	GasGas Factory Racing Tech3	KTM	23	+26.500	20	1
16	51	(Italy) Michele Pirro	Aruba.it Racing	Ducati	23	+30.150	16	
17	25	(Spain) Raúl Fernández	CryptoData RNF MotoGP Team	Aprilia	23	+38.001	19	
18	32	(Italy) Lorenzo Savadori	Aprilia Racing	Aprilia	23	+38.662	21	
19	94	(Germany) Jonas Folger	GasGas Factory Racing Tech3	KTM	27	+1:18.912	22	
Ret	73	(Spain) Álex Márquez	Gresini Racing MotoGP	Ducati	14	Accident	6 (Note: 3-place grid penalty)	
Ret	88	(Portugal) Miguel Oliveira	CryptoData RNF MotoGP Team	Aprilia	10	Accident	17	
Ret	93	(Spain) Marc Márquez	Repsol Honda Team	Honda	5	Accident	2	
DNS	42	(Spain) Álex Rins	LCR Honda Castrol	Honda		Did not start		
DNS	36	(Spain) Joan Mir	Repsol Honda Team	Honda		Did not start		
Fastest lap: (Spain) Álex Márquez (Ducati) – 1:46.807 (lap 5)
OFFICIAL MOTOGP RACE REPORT

- Álex Rins suffered a broken leg during the sprint and withdrew from the main race.

=== Moto2 ===
Pos.	No.	Rider	Constructor	Laps	Time/Retired	Grid	Points
1	37	(Spain) Pedro Acosta	Kalex	19	35:38.238	2	25
2	14	(Italy) Tony Arbolino	Kalex	19	+6.194	10	20
3	96	(United Kingdom) Jake Dixon	Kalex	19	+8.582	6	16
4	40	(Spain) Arón Canet	Kalex	19	+8.847	1	13
5	13	(Italy) Celestino Vietti	Kalex	19	+9.534	7	11
6	21	(Spain) Alonso López	Boscoscuro	19	+10.852	9	10
7	12	(Czech Republic) Filip Salač	Kalex	19	+13.994	5	9
8	18	(Spain) Manuel González	Kalex	19	+16.171	11	8
9	35	(Thailand) Somkiat Chantra	Kalex	19	+18.008	17	7
10	11	(Spain) Sergio García	Kalex	19	+18.021	16	6
11	34	(Italy) Mattia Pasini	Kalex	19	+20.365	18	5
12	16	(United States) Joe Roberts	Kalex	19	+22.895	4	4
13	71	(Italy) Dennis Foggia	Kalex	19	+23.143	21	3
14	64	(Netherlands) Bo Bendsneyder	Kalex	19	+23.851	20	2
15	79	(Japan) Ai Ogura	Kalex	19	+24.307	14	1
16	7	(Belgium) Barry Baltus	Kalex	19	+25.046	19	
17	72	(Spain) Borja Gómez	Kalex	19	+28.601	25	
18	28	(Spain) Izan Guevara	Kalex	19	+29.642	24	
19	4	(United States) Sean Dylan Kelly	Kalex	19	+48.482	23	
20	19	(Italy) Lorenzo Dalla Porta	Kalex	19	+48.708	29	
21	23	(Japan) Taiga Hada	Kalex	19	+59.397	28	
22	27	(Malaysia) Kasma Daniel	Kalex	19	+1:31.843	30	
23	75	(Spain) Albert Arenas	Kalex	17	+2 laps	15	
Ret	84	(Netherlands) Zonta van den Goorbergh	Kalex	9	Accident	22	
Ret	3	(Germany) Lukas Tulovic	Kalex	7	Accident	26	
Ret	22	(United Kingdom) Sam Lowes	Kalex	1	Accident	3	
Ret	54	(Spain) Fermín Aldeguer	Boscoscuro	1	Accident	8	
Ret	52	(Spain) Jeremy Alcoba	Kalex	1	Accident	12	
Ret	15	(South Africa) Darryn Binder	Kalex	1	Accident	13	
Ret	24	(Spain) Marcos Ramírez	Forward	1	Accident	27	
DNS	33	(United Kingdom) Rory Skinner	Kalex		Did not start		
Fastest lap: (Spain) Pedro Acosta (Kalex) – 1:51.345 (lap 3)
OFFICIAL MOTO2 RACE REPORT

- Rory Skinner suffered a fractured right foot during a crash in Practice 3 and withdrew from the race.

=== Moto3 ===
Pos.	No.	Rider	Constructor	Laps	Time/Retired	Grid	Points
1	96	(Spain) Daniel Holgado	KTM	17	33:27.315	3	25
2	53	(Turkey) Deniz Öncü	KTM	17	+0.051	1	20
3	71	(Japan) Ayumu Sasaki	Husqvarna	17	+0.056	2	16
4	80	(Colombia) David Alonso	Gas Gas	17	+0.172	10	13
5	5	(Spain) Jaume Masià	Honda	17	+0.487	6	11
6	95	(Netherlands) Collin Veijer	Husqvarna	17	+13.321	16	10
7	10	(Brazil) Diogo Moreira	KTM	17	+13.332	22 (Note: Back of the grid start penalty.)	9
8	54	(Italy) Riccardo Rossi	Honda	17	+13.360	5	8
9	82	(Italy) Stefano Nepa	KTM	17	+13.429	23	7
10	27	(Japan) Kaito Toba	Honda	17	+13.460	12	6
11	48	(Spain) Iván Ortolá	KTM	17	+14.146	25	5
12	18	(Italy) Matteo Bertelle	Honda	17	+14.243	4	4
13	19	(United Kingdom) Scott Ogden	Honda	17	+15.023	9	3
14	99	(Spain) José Antonio Rueda	KTM	17	+15.701	13	2
15	6	(Japan) Ryusei Yamanaka	Gas Gas	17	+15.774	14	1
16	16	(Italy) Andrea Migno	KTM	17	+20.945	7	
17	55	(Italy) Romano Fenati	Honda	17	+23.062	15	
18	38	(Spain) David Salvador	KTM	17	+38.743	27	
19	58	(Italy) Luca Lunetta	KTM	17	+38.783	28	
20	64	(Indonesia) Mario Aji	Honda	17	+38.981	18	
21	70	(United Kingdom) Joshua Whatley	Honda	17	+39.002	19	
22	22	(Spain) Ana Carrasco	KTM	17	+40.085	20	
Ret	72	(Japan) Taiyo Furusato	Honda	16	Accident	8	
Ret	24	(Japan) Tatsuki Suzuki	Honda	16	Accident	11	
Ret	21	(Spain) Vicente Pérez	KTM	8	Accident	26	
Ret	66	(Australia) Joel Kelso	CFMoto	7	Accident	21	
Ret	7	(Italy) Filippo Farioli	KTM	1	Accident	17	
Ret	43	(Spain) Xavier Artigas	CFMoto	1	Accident	24	
DNS	63	(Malaysia) Syarifuddin Azman	KTM		Did not start		
Fastest lap: (Japan) Ayumu Sasaki (Honda) – 1:56.298 (lap 4)
OFFICIAL MOTO3 RACE REPORT

- Syarifuddin Azman suffered a fractured left rib during a crash in Practice 2 and withdrew from the race.

=== MotoE ===
==== Race 1 ====
Pos.	No.	Rider	Laps	Time/Retired	Grid	Points
1	9	(Italy) Andrea Mantovani	7	13:39.949	5	25
2	11	(Italy) Matteo Ferrari	7	+0.152	1	20
3	40	(Italy) Mattia Casadei	7	+0.488	2	16
4	4	(Spain) Héctor Garzó	7	+3.058	9	13
5	3	(Switzerland) Randy Krummenacher	7	+3.085	3	11
6	51	(Brazil) Eric Granado	7	+4.608	4	10
7	34	(Italy) Kevin Manfredi	7	+4.646	8	9
8	21	(Italy) Kevin Zannoni	7	+4.725	6	8
9	81	(Spain) Jordi Torres	7	+4.925	7	7
10	77	(Spain) Miquel Pons	7	+5.846	14	6
11	61	(Italy) Alessandro Zaccone	7	+11.272	15	5
12	53	(Spain) Tito Rabat	7	+11.440	12	4
13	23	(Italy) Luca Salvadori	7	+12.972	11	3
14	72	(Italy) Alessio Finello	7	+13.271	13	2
15	78	(Japan) Hikari Okubo	7	+18.254	16	1
16	8	(Spain) Mika Pérez	7	+25.349	17	
17	6	(Spain) María Herrera	7	+29.017	18	
Ret	29	(Italy) Nicholas Spinelli	2	Accident	10	
Fastest lap: (Italy) Matteo Ferrari – 1:55.727 (lap 2)
OFFICIAL MOTOE RACE NR.1 REPORT

- All bikes manufactured by Ducati.

==== Race 2 ====
The race, scheduled to be run for seven laps, was red-flagged after five laps due to inclement weather. The race was deemed as completed and was not restarted.

Pos.	No.	Rider	Laps	Time/Retired	Grid	Points
1	51	(Brazil) Eric Granado	5	11:25.573	4	25
2	34	(Italy) Kevin Manfredi	5	+1.301	8	20
3	11	(Italy) Matteo Ferrari	5	+1.666	1	16
4	29	(Italy) Nicholas Spinelli	5	+2.513	10	13
5	81	(Spain) Jordi Torres	5	+4.269	7	11
6	4	(Spain) Héctor Garzó	5	+4.456	9	10
7	3	(Switzerland) Randy Krummenacher	5	+7.157	3	9
8	8	(Spain) Mika Pérez	5	+7.486	15	8
9	61	(Italy) Alessandro Zaccone	5	+7.530	13	7
10	21	(Italy) Kevin Zannoni	5	+15.572	6	6
11	23	(Italy) Luca Salvadori	5	+15.700	17 (Note: Pit lane start penalty.)	5
12	78	(Japan) Hikari Okubo	5	+17.689	14	4
13	53	(Spain) Tito Rabat	5	+21.489	18	3
14	6	(Spain) María Herrera	4	+1 lap	16	2
15	77	(Spain) Miquel Pons	4	+1 lap	12	1
Ret	40	(Italy) Mattia Casadei	4	Accident	2	
Ret	72	(Italy) Alessio Finello	4	Accident	11	
Ret	9	(Italy) Andrea Mantovani	4	Accident	5	
Fastest lap: (Brazil) Eric Granado – 2:13.323 (lap 5)
OFFICIAL MOTOE RACE NR.2 REPORT

- All bikes manufactured by Ducati.

== Championship standings after the race ==
Below are the standings for the top five riders, constructors, and teams after the round.

=== MotoGP ===
Riders' Championship standings

	Pos.	Rider	Points
	1	(Italy) Francesco Bagnaia	131
	2	(Italy) Marco Bezzecchi	110
1	3	(Spain) Jorge Martín	107
1	4	(South Africa) Brad Binder	92
	5	(France) Johann Zarco	88

Constructors' Championship standings

Pos.	Constructor	Points
1	(Italy) Ducati	211
2	(Austria) KTM	118
3	(Italy) Aprilia	92
4	(Japan) Honda	79
5	(Japan) Yamaha	64

Teams' Championship standings

	Pos.	Team	Points
1	1	(Italy) Prima Pramac Racing	195
1	2	(Italy) Mooney VR46 Racing Team	182
	3	(Austria) Red Bull KTM Factory Racing	154
	4	(Italy) Ducati Lenovo Team	149
	5	(Italy) Aprilia Racing	107

=== Moto2 ===
Riders' Championship standings

Pos.	Rider	Points
1	(Italy) Tony Arbolino	119
2	(Spain) Pedro Acosta	99
3	(Spain) Alonso López	71
4	(Czech Republic) Filip Salač	69
5	(Spain) Arón Canet	65

Constructors' Championship standings

Pos.	Constructor	Points
1	(Germany) Kalex	150
2	(Italy) Boscoscuro	75

Teams' Championship standings

	Pos.	Team	Points
	1	(Belgium) Elf Marc VDS Racing Team	163
	2	(Finland) Red Bull KTM Ajo	126
	3	(Italy) MB Conveyors Speed Up	99
1	4	(Spain) Pons Wegow Los40	94
1	5	(Italy) QJmotor Gresini Moto2	91

=== Moto3 ===
Riders' Championship standings

	Pos.	Rider	Points
	1	(Spain) Daniel Holgado	109
1	2	(Spain) Jaume Masià	74
1	3	(Spain) Iván Ortolá	68
	4	(Brazil) Diogo Moreira	64
1	5	(Japan) Ayumu Sasaki	59

Constructors' Championship standings

	Pos.	Constructor	Points
	1	(Austria) KTM	145
	2	(Japan) Honda	99
1	3	(Sweden) Husqvarna	62
1	4	(Spain) Gas Gas	59
2	5	(China) CFMoto	50

Teams' Championship standings

	Pos.	Team	Points
	1	(Luxembourg) Leopard Racing	112
1	2	(France) Red Bull KTM Tech3	111
1	3	(Italy) Angeluss MTA Team	101
	4	(Finland) Red Bull KTM Ajo	92
3	5	(Germany) Liqui Moly Husqvarna Intact GP	77

=== MotoE ===
Riders' Championship standings

	Pos.	Rider	Points
	1	(Spain) Jordi Torres	63
1	2	(Italy) Matteo Ferrari	61
1	3	(Spain) Héctor Garzó	59
	4	(Switzerland) Randy Krummenacher	45
8	5	(Italy) Kevin Manfredi	38

Teams' Championship standings

	Pos.	Team	Points
	1	(Germany) Dynavolt Intact GP MotoE	104
1	2	(Italy) Felo Gresini MotoE	75
2	3	(Italy) Ongetta Sic58 Squadracorse	73
2	4	(Spain) Openbank Aspar Team	68
1	5	(Spain) HP Pons Los40	53

== Notes ==
Previous race: 2023 French Grand Prix	FIM Grand Prix World Championship; 2023 season	Next race: 2023 German Grand Prix
Previous race: 2022 Italian Grand Prix	Italian motorcycle Grand Prix	Next race: 2024 Italian Grand Prix
