= Héctor Garzó =

Spanish motorcycle racer

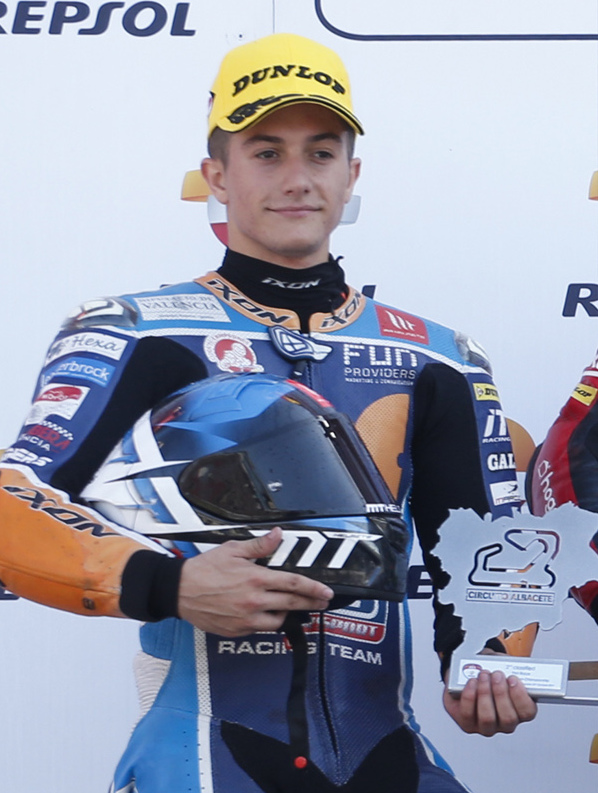
- Garzó in 2019
- Nationality: Spanish
- Born: 9 June 1998 (age 28); Paterna, Spain
- Current team: Dynavolt Intact GP MotoE
- Bike number: 4
Motorcycle racing career statistics
Moto2 World Championship
Active years	2017–2018, 2020–2021, 2023, 2025
Manufacturers	Tech3, Kalex, NTS
Championships	0
2023 championship position	NC (0 pts)
Starts / Wins / Podiums / Poles / F. laps / Points; 36 / 0 / 1 / 0 / 2 / 79
MotoE World Championship
Active years	2019, 2022-
Manufacturers	Energica, Ducati
Championships	1 (2024)
2025 championship position	9th (115 pts)
Starts / Wins / Podiums / Poles / F. laps / Points; 62 / 5 / 20 / 2 / 10 / 731
Supersport World Championship
Active years	2023
Manufacturers	Yamaha
Championships	0
2023 championship position	NC (0 pts)
Starts / Wins / Podiums / Poles / F. laps / Points; 2 / 0 / 0 / 0 / 0 / 0

Héctor Garzó Vicent (born 9 June 1998) is a Spanish motorcycle racer. He has competed in Grand Prix racing over nine seasons between 2017 and 2025, most notably winning the 2024 MotoE World Championship with IntactGP. Garzó most recently competed in the MotoE World Cup for the Tech3 team, before the series folded.

== Career ==
=== Moto3 Junior World Championship ===
Garzó competed in the 2016 FIM CEV Moto3 Junior World Championship without scoring a point.

=== Moto2 European Championship ===
Garzó moved to the Moto2 European Championship the following season, and was much more successful, scoring a second place, and three third place finishes in the year, ending the season with 126 points, and fourth in the overall standings.

Garzó would stay for the 2018 season as well, scoring two third places in Aragón, before winning his first race of the category in Albacete. He would score one more podium, a second place in the season closer at Valencia, ending his season third in the championship standings, with 124 points.

In the 2019 season, Garzó would win two races, one each in Aragón and Alabecete, and finished on the second step of the podium six times, ending his final season in the category second overall in the championship standings, with 183 points, 38 points behind Edgar Pons.

=== Moto2 World Championship ===
==== Tech3 Racing (2017–2018) ====
Garzó made his Moto2 World Championship debut at the 2017 German motorcycle Grand Prix replacing the injured Xavi Vierge, but retired from the race. In the 2018 Moto2 World Championship, he would make a further three appearances replacing the injured Remy Gardner, but failed to score points in any of the three races at Jerez, Le Mans, and Mugello.

==== Flexbox HP40 (2020–2021) ====
Garzó would get his first full time Moto2 season in 2020, partnering Lorenzo Baldassarri at Flexbox Pons Racing. Garzó had a decent season, finishing in the top-ten in five races, including his maiden podium in the category, a second place in Valencia. Garzó finished his rookie season with 63 points, 16th in the standings, and second among rookies.

Staying with Flexbox Pons Racing for the 2021 Moto2 World Championship, Garzó would struggle during the year, only scoring one top-ten finish, four point scoring finishes, and was forced to miss two races due to burns suffered in a crash at Catalunya. He was replaced by Alonso López. Garzó finished his disappointing season 23rd in the standings, with 16 points, and was not extended by Pons Racing team for 2022.

=== MotoE World Championship ===
Garzó would make his debut in the 2019 MotoE World Cup, riding for Tech3. He had a good season, finishing fourth in Germany, and scoring two second places in the two rounds at Misano. He would end the season well with a second place and a third place in Valencia, but was disqualified from the first Valencia race for having too low pressure in his tyres. This ended his title fight, and he finished the season fourth in the championship, with 69 points.

Following a disappointing 2021 Moto2 season, Tech3 signed Garzó for the 2022 MotoE World Cup.

== Career statistics ==
=== FIM CEV Moto3 Junior World Championship ===
==== Races by year ====
(key) (Races in bold indicate pole position, races in italics indicate fastest lap)

Year	Bike	1	2	3	4	5	6	7	8	9	10	11	12	Pos	Pts
2016	Honda	VAL1; 24	VAL2; 27	LMS; 25	ARA; 33	CAT1; 25	CAT2; 25	ALB; 26	ALG; Ret	JER1; 33	JER2; 28	VAL1; DNQ	VAL2; DNQ	NC	0

=== FIM CEV Moto2 European Championship ===
==== Races by year ====
(key) (Races in bold indicate pole position, races in italics indicate fastest lap)

Year	Bike	1	2	3	4	5	6	7	8	9	10	11	Pos	Pts
2017	Tech3	ALB; 2	CAT1; 5	CAT2; 3	VAL1; 3	VAL2; Ret	EST1; 5	EST2; 4	JER; Ret	ARA1; 6	ARA2; 3	VAL; 4	4th	126
2018	Tech3	EST1; 8	EST2; Ret	VAL; 4	CAT1; 4	CAT2; 7	ARA1; 3	ARA2; 3	**JER**; Ret	ALB1; 1	ALB2; 8	VAL; 2	3rd	124
2019	Kalex	EST1; Ret	EST2; 4	VAL; 2	CAT1; 2	CAT2; Ret	ARA1; 1	ARA2; 2	**JER**; 2	ALB1; 2	ALB2; 1	**VAL**; 2	2nd	183
2023	NTS-Triumph	EST1	EST2	VAL1; DNQ	JER	POR1	POR2	CAT1	CAT2	ARA1	ARA2	VAL2	NC	0
2025	Kalex	EST1	EST2	JER	MAG1; WD	MAG2; WD	ARA1	ARA2	MIS; WD	CAT1	CAT2	VAL	NC*	0*
2025	NTS	EST1	EST2	JER	MAG1	MAG2	ARA1	ARA2	MIS	CAT1; WD	CAT2; WD	VAL	NC*	0*

=== FIM Moto2 European Championship ===
==== Races by year ====
(key) (Races in bold indicate pole position) (Races in italics indicate fastest lap)

Year	Bike	1		2	3		4	5		6		7	Pos	Pts
Year	Bike	R1	R2	R1	R1	R2	R1	R1	R2	R1	R2	R1	Pos	Pts
2022	MV Agusta	EST; Ret	EST; 25	VAL; DNS	CAT; 10	CAT; 8	JER; 8	POR	POR	ARA	ARA	VAL	11th	42
2022	Kalex	EST	EST	VAL; DNS	CAT	CAT	JER; 8	POR; 7	POR; Ret	ARA	ARA	VAL; 5	11th	42

=== Grand Prix motorcycle racing ===
==== By season ====
Season	Class	Motorcycle	Team	Race	Win	Podium	Pole	FLap	Pts	Plcd	WCh
2017	Moto2	Tech3 Mistral 610	Tech3 Racing	1	0	0	0	0	0	NC	–
2018	Moto2	Tech3 Mistral 610	Tech3 Racing	3	0	0	0	0	0	39th	–
2019	MotoE	Energica Ego Corsa	Tech3 E-Racing	6	0	3	0	1	69	4th	–
2020	Moto2	Kalex Moto2	Flexbox HP40	15	0	1	0	2	63	16th	–
2021	Moto2	Kalex Moto2	Flexbox HP40	16	0	0	0	0	16	23rd	–
2022	MotoE	Energica Ego Corsa	Tech3 E-Racing	12	0	0	0	1	86	8th	–
2023	MotoE	Ducati V21L	Dynavolt Intact GP MotoE	16	1	6	0	4	215	4th	–
2023	Moto2	NTS	Fieten Olie Racing GP	1	0	0	0	0	0	NC	–
2024	MotoE	Ducati V21L	Dynavolt Intact GP MotoE	16	4	9	2	3	246	**1st**	1
2025	MotoE	Ducati V21L	Dynavolt Intact GP MotoE	12	0	2	0	1	115	9th	–
2025	Moto2	NTS NH7	RW NTS Idrofolgia	0	0	0	0	0	0*	NC*	–
Total				**98**	**5**	**21**	**2**	**12**	**810**		**1**

==== By class ====
Class	Seasons	1st GP	1st Pod	1st Win	Race	Win	Podiums	Pole	FLap	Pts	WChmp
MotoE	2019, 2022–	2019 Germany	2019 San Marino Race 1	2023 German Race 2	62	5	20	2	10	731	1
Moto2	2017–2018, 2020–2021, 2023	2017 Germany	2020 Valencia		36	0	1	0	2	79	0
Total	2017–present				**98**	**5**	**21**	**2**	**12**	**810**	**1**

==== Races by year ====
(key) (Races in bold indicate pole position; races in italics indicate fastest lap)

Year	Class	Bike	1	2	3	4	5	6	7	8	9	10	11	12	13	14	15	16	17	18	19	20	21	22	Pos	Pts
2017	Moto2	Tech3	QAT	ARG	AME	SPA	FRA	ITA	CAT	NED	GER; Ret	CZE	AUT	GBR	RSM	ARA	JPN	AUS	MAL	VAL					NC	0
2018	Moto2	Tech3	QAT	ARG	AME	SPA; 23	FRA; Ret	ITA; 20	CAT	NED	GER	CZE	AUT	GBR	RSM	ARA	THA	JPN	AUS	MAL	VAL; DNS				39th	0
2019	MotoE	Energica	GER; 4	AUT; Ret	RSM1; 2	RSM2; 2	VAL1; DSQ	VAL2; 3																	4th	69
2020	Moto2	Kalex	QAT; 17	SPA; 12	ANC; Ret	CZE; Ret	AUT; 15	STY; 9	RSM; Ret	EMI; 10	CAT; 13	FRA; 12	ARA; 7	TER; Ret	EUR; 7	VAL; 2	POR; Ret								16th	63
2021	Moto2	Kalex	QAT; Ret	DOH; 16	POR; 8	SPA; Ret	FRA; Ret	ITA; 13	CAT; Ret	GER	NED; DNS	STY; Ret	AUT; 15	GBR; Ret	ARA; Ret	RSM; 20	AME; Ret	EMI; Ret	ALR; 12	VAL; Ret					23rd	16
2022	MotoE	Energica	SPA1; 4	SPA2; Ret	FRA1; 5	FRA2; 8	ITA1; 9	ITA2; 10	NED1; 5	NED2; 10^{‡}	AUT1; 5	AUT2; 8	RSM1; 10	RSM2; 14											8th	86
2023	MotoE	Ducati	FRA1; 2	FRA2; 3	ITA1; 4	ITA2; 6	GER1; Ret	GER2; 1	NED1; 7	NED2; 11	GBR1; 4	GBR2; 5	AUT1; 4	AUT2; 5	CAT1; 3	CAT2; 4	RSM1; 2	RSM2; 2							4th	215
2023	Moto2	NTS	POR	ARG	AME	SPA	FRA	ITA	GER	NED	GBR	AUT	CAT	RSM	IND	JPN	INA	AUS	THA	MAL	QAT	VAL; Ret			NC	0
2024	MotoE	Ducati	POR1; 2	POR2; 2	**FRA1**; Ret	**FRA2**; Ret	CAT1; 4	CAT2; 5	ITA1; 3	ITA2; 8	NED1; 1	NED2; 3	GER1; 1	GER2; 1	AUT1; 2	AUT2; 1	RSM1; 4	RSM2; 7							1st	246
2025	MotoE	Ducati	FRA1; WD	FRA2; WD	NED1; 9	NED2; 5	AUT1; 2	AUT2; 3	HUN1; 7	HUN2; 5	CAT1; 7	CAT2; 7	RSM1; 8	RSM2; Ret	POR1; 12	POR2; 5									9th	115
2025	Moto2	NTS	THA	ARG	AME	QAT	SPA	FRA	GBR	ARA	ITA	NED	GER	CZE	AUT	HUN	CAT	RSM	JPN	INA	AUS	MAL	POR	VAL; Ret	NC	0

^{‡} Half points awarded as less than two thirds of the race distance (but at least three full laps) was completed.

=== Supersport World Championship ===
==== Races by year ====
(key) (Races in bold indicate pole position, races in italics indicate fastest lap)

Year	Bike	1	2	3	4	5	6	7	8	9	10	11	12	13	14	15	16	17	18	19	20	21	22	23	24	Pos	Pts
2023	Yamaha	AUS	AUS	INA	INA	NED	NED	SPA	SPA	MIS	MIS	GBR	GBR	ITA	ITA	CZE	CZE	FRA	FRA	SPA; Ret	SPA; DNS	POR	POR	JER	JER	NC	0
