= 2017 Moto2 World Championship =

8th running of the Moto2 World Championship

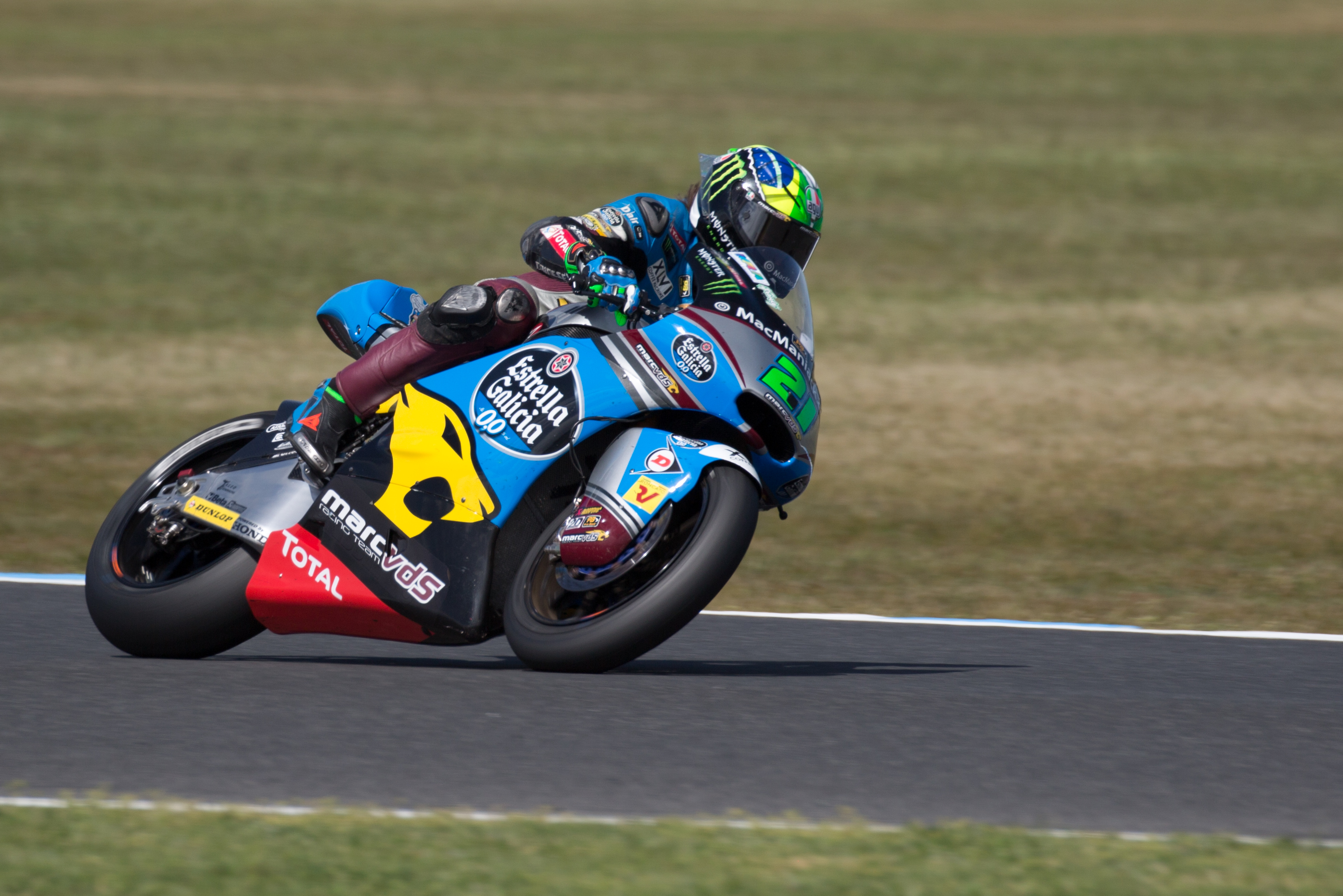
Franco Morbidelli (pictured in 2016) was the 2017 Moto2 World Riders' Champion.

The 2017 FIM Moto2 World Championship was the intermediate class of the 69th Fédération Internationale de Motocyclisme (FIM) Road Racing World Championship season.

The season was marred by the death of Stefan Kiefer, head of Kiefer Racing, in Malaysia. Johann Zarco was the reigning two-time series champion but he did not further defend his title as he joined the series' premier class, MotoGP.

The 2017 season was the first season for the KTM Moto2 chassis, after KTM expanded its factory operations to Moto2 and MotoGP.

== Calendar ==
The following Grands Prix were scheduled to take place in 2017.

Round	Date	Grand Prix	Circuit
1	26 March ‡	Grand Prix of Qatar	Lusail International Circuit, Lusail
2	9 April	Gran Premio Motul de la República Argentina	Autódromo Termas de Río Hondo, Termas de Río Hondo
3	23 April	(United States) Red Bull Grand Prix of the Americas	Circuit of the Americas, Austin
4	7 May	(Spain) Gran Premio Red Bull de España	Circuito de Jerez, Jerez de la Frontera
5	21 May	HJC Helmets Grand Prix de France	Bugatti Circuit, Le Mans
6	4 June	(Italy) Gran Premio d'Italia Oakley	Mugello Circuit, Scarperia e San Piero
7	11 June	(Catalonia) Gran Premi Monster Energy de Catalunya	Circuit de Barcelona-Catalunya, Montmeló
8	25 June	(Netherlands) Motul TT Assen	TT Circuit Assen, Assen
9	2 July	(Germany) GoPro Motorrad Grand Prix Deutschland	Sachsenring, Hohenstein-Ernstthal
10	6 August	(Czech Republic) Monster Energy Grand Prix České republiky	Brno Circuit, Brno
11	13 August	(Austria) NeroGiardini Motorrad Grand Prix von Österreich	Red Bull Ring, Spielberg
12	27 August	(United Kingdom) Octo British Grand Prix	Silverstone Circuit, Silverstone
13	10 September	Gran Premio Tribul MasterCard di San Marino e della Riviera di Rimini	Misano World Circuit, Misano Adriatico
14	24 September	(Aragon) Gran Premio Movistar de Aragón	MotorLand Aragón, Alcañiz
15	15 October	Motul Grand Prix of Japan	Motegi Circuit, Motegi
16	22 October	(Australia) Michelin Australian Motorcycle Grand Prix	Phillip Island Grand Prix Circuit, Phillip Island
17	29 October	Shell Malaysia Motorcycle Grand Prix	Sepang International Circuit, Sepang
18	12 November	(Valencian Community) Gran Premio Motul de la Comunitat Valenciana	Circuit Ricardo Tormo, Valencia

‡ = Night race

=== Calendar changes ===
- The Austrian and Czech Republic Grand Prix swapped places, with the Czech Republic hosting the tenth round, while Austria hosts the eleventh round.
- The British Grand Prix was scheduled to move from Silverstone to the new Circuit of Wales, but construction on the new track has not commenced. The two circuits reached a deal that will see Silverstone continue to host the British Grand Prix in 2017, with an option to host the 2018 race.

== Teams and riders ==
A provisional list of team entrants for 2017 was released on 26 October 2016. All Moto2 competitors raced with an identical CBR600RR inline-four engine developed by Honda. Teams competed with tyres supplied by Dunlop.

Team	Constructor	Motorcycle	No.	Rider	Rounds
(Spain) AGR Team	Kalex	Kalex Moto2	68	(Colombia) Yonny Hernández	1–9
(Spain) AGR Team	Kalex	Kalex Moto2	20	(United States) Joe Roberts	10–14
(Switzerland) Forward Racing Team (Switzerland) Forward Junior Team	Kalex	Kalex Moto2	7	(Italy) Lorenzo Baldassarri	1–8, 10–18
(Switzerland) Forward Racing Team (Switzerland) Forward Junior Team	Kalex	Kalex Moto2	10	(Italy) Luca Marini	All
(Switzerland) Forward Racing Team (Switzerland) Forward Junior Team	Kalex	Kalex Moto2	22	(Italy) Federico Fuligni	6–7, 13–14
(Switzerland) Forward Racing Team (Switzerland) Forward Junior Team	Kalex	Kalex Moto2	22	(Italy) Federico Fuligni	9
(Italy) Federal Oil Gresini Moto2	Kalex	Kalex Moto2	9	(Spain) Jorge Navarro	1–16, 18
(Italy) Federal Oil Gresini Moto2	Kalex	Kalex Moto2	26	(Indonesia) Dimas Ekky Pratama	17
(Belgium) EG 0,0 Marc VDS	Kalex	Kalex Moto2	21	(Italy) Franco Morbidelli	All
(Belgium) EG 0,0 Marc VDS	Kalex	Kalex Moto2	73	(Spain) Álex Márquez	All
(Japan) Idemitsu Honda Team Asia	Kalex	Kalex Moto2	30	(Japan) Takaaki Nakagami	All
(Japan) Idemitsu Honda Team Asia	Kalex	Kalex Moto2	89	(Malaysia) Khairul Idham Pawi	All
(Switzerland) Garage Plus Interwetten (Switzerland) CarXpert Interwetten	Kalex	Kalex Moto2	2	(Switzerland) Jesko Raffin	All
(Switzerland) Garage Plus Interwetten (Switzerland) CarXpert Interwetten	Kalex	Kalex Moto2	12	(Switzerland) Thomas Lüthi	1–17
(Switzerland) Garage Plus Interwetten (Switzerland) CarXpert Interwetten	Kalex	Kalex Moto2	88	(Spain) Ricard Cardús	18
(Switzerland) Garage Plus Interwetten (Switzerland) CarXpert Interwetten	Kalex	Kalex Moto2	27	(Spain) Iker Lecuona	3–5, 7–18
(Switzerland) Garage Plus Interwetten (Switzerland) CarXpert Interwetten	Kalex	Kalex Moto2	60	(Spain) Julián Simón	1–2
(Switzerland) Garage Plus Interwetten (Switzerland) CarXpert Interwetten	Kalex	Kalex Moto2	52	(United Kingdom) Danny Kent	6
(Italy) Italtrans Racing Team	Kalex	Kalex Moto2	5	(Italy) Andrea Locatelli	All
(Italy) Italtrans Racing Team	Kalex	Kalex Moto2	54	(Italy) Mattia Pasini	All
Petronas Raceline Malaysia	Kalex	Kalex Moto2	55	(Malaysia) Hafizh Syahrin	All
(Spain) Pons HP40	Kalex	Kalex Moto2	40	(France) Fabio Quartararo	All
(Spain) Pons HP40	Kalex	Kalex Moto2	57	(Spain) Edgar Pons	All
(Spain) Promoracing	Kalex	Kalex Moto2	51	(Brazil) Eric Granado	18
(Netherlands) RW Racing GP	Kalex	Kalex Moto2	49	(Spain) Axel Pons	All
(Spain) BE-A-VIP SAG Team (Spain) Teluru SAG Team (Japan) Teluru MOTOBUM Racing Team	Kalex	Kalex Moto2	32	(Spain) Isaac Viñales	All
(Spain) BE-A-VIP SAG Team (Spain) Teluru SAG Team (Japan) Teluru MOTOBUM Racing Team	Kalex	Kalex Moto2	45	(Japan) Tetsuta Nagashima	All
(Spain) BE-A-VIP SAG Team (Spain) Teluru SAG Team (Japan) Teluru MOTOBUM Racing Team	Kalex	Kalex Moto2	33	(Japan) Ikuhiro Enokido	15
(Italy) Sky Racing Team VR46	Kalex	Kalex Moto2	42	(Italy) Francesco Bagnaia	All
(Italy) Sky Racing Team VR46	Kalex	Kalex Moto2	62	(Italy) Stefano Manzi	All
(Italy) Tasca Racing Scuderia Moto2	Kalex	Kalex Moto2	19	(Belgium) Xavier Siméon	1–11, 13–16, 18
(Italy) Tasca Racing Scuderia Moto2	Kalex	Kalex Moto2	15	(San Marino) Alex de Angelis	12, 17
(Japan) MuSASHi RT HARC-RRO	Kalex	Kalex Moto2	34	(Japan) Ryo Mizuno	15
(Czech Republic) Willirace Team	Kalex	Kalex Moto2	98	(Czech Republic) Karel Hanika	10
(Finland) Red Bull KTM Ajo	KTM	KTM Moto2	41	(South Africa) Brad Binder	1–2, 6–18
(Finland) Red Bull KTM Ajo	KTM	KTM Moto2	88	(Spain) Ricard Cardús	3–5
(Finland) Red Bull KTM Ajo	KTM	KTM Moto2	44	(Portugal) Miguel Oliveira	All
(Japan) NTS	NTS	NTS NH6	4	(South Africa) Steven Odendaal	14
(Italy) Speed Up Racing	Speed Up	Speed Up SF7	24	(Italy) Simone Corsi	All
(Italy) Speed Up Racing	Speed Up	Speed Up SF7	88	(Spain) Ricard Cardús	1
(Italy) Speed Up Racing	Speed Up	Speed Up SF7	47	(Italy) Axel Bassani	2–5
(Italy) Speed Up Racing	Speed Up	Speed Up SF7	37	(Spain) Augusto Fernández	6–18
(Qatar) QMMF Racing	Speed Up	Speed Up SF16	8	(Qatar) Saeed Al Sulaiti	1
(Qatar) QMMF Racing	Speed Up	Speed Up SF16	96	(Qatar) Nasser Al Malki	1
(Germany) Dynavolt Intact GP	Suter	Suter MMX2	11	(Germany) Sandro Cortese	All
(Germany) Dynavolt Intact GP	Suter	Suter MMX2	23	(Germany) Marcel Schrötter	1–10, 14–18
(Germany) Dynavolt Intact GP	Suter	Suter MMX2	52	(United Kingdom) Danny Kent	11
(Germany) Dynavolt Intact GP	Suter	Suter MMX2	94	(United Kingdom) Jake Dixon	12
(Germany) Dynavolt Intact GP	Suter	Suter MMX2	15	(San Marino) Alex de Angelis	13
(Germany) Dynavolt Intact GP	Suter	Suter MMX2	94	(United Kingdom) Jake Dixon	18
(Germany) Kiefer Racing	Suter	Suter MMX2	52	(United Kingdom) Danny Kent	1–3
(Germany) Kiefer Racing	Suter	Suter MMX2	22	(Italy) Federico Fuligni	4
(Germany) Kiefer Racing	Suter	Suter MMX2	6	(United Kingdom) Tarran Mackenzie	5–18
(Germany) Kiefer Racing	Suter	Suter MMX2	77	(Switzerland) Dominique Aegerter	All
(France) Tech 3 Racing	Tech 3	Tech 3 Mistral 610	87	(Australia) Remy Gardner	1–2, 4–18
(France) Tech 3 Racing	Tech 3	Tech 3 Mistral 610	60	(Spain) Julián Simón	3
(France) Tech 3 Racing	Tech 3	Tech 3 Mistral 610	97	(Spain) Xavi Vierge	1–8, 10–18
(France) Tech 3 Racing	Tech 3	Tech 3 Mistral 610	14	(Spain) Héctor Garzó	9

Key
Regular rider
Wildcard rider
Replacement rider

=== Team changes ===
- Ajo Motorsport switched to KTM bikes, with KTM making their Moto2 debut. KTM fielded two bikes for Brad Binder and Miguel Oliveira.
- Valentino Rossi's Sky Racing Team VR46 expanded to Moto2, fielding two Kalex bikes for Francesco Bagnaia and Stefano Manzi.
- SAG Team fielded two bikes again, after running most of the 2016 season with only one bike due to Luis Salom's death at the Catalonia Grand Prix.
- After four years with Kalex, Dynavolt Intact GP switched to Suter.
- Leopard Racing reverted to their original name Kiefer Racing. In addition, they have also switched to Suter.
- Italtrans Racing Team competed with two bikes again in 2017, with Pasini and Locatelli riding.
- AGR Team have downsized to one bike in exchange for one slot in Moto3 for 2017.
- QMMF Racing Team withdrew from the championship. As a result of losing their customer, Speed Up Racing have expanded to two bikes.
- RW Racing GP switched from Moto3 to Moto2 for 2017.

=== Rider changes ===
- Isaac Viñales switched team to SAG Team, filling the spot vacated by the late Luis Salom. Remy Gardner has replaced Viñales in Tech 3 for 2017.
- Marcel Schrötter switched team to Dynavolt Intact GP, filling the spot vacated by Jonas Folger who moved up to MotoGP with Monster Yamaha Tech 3.
- Jorge Navarro moved up to Moto2 with Federal Oil Gresini Moto2, filling the spot vacated by Sam Lowes who was promoted to MotoGP with the Aprilia Gresini Team.
- Francesco Bagnaia and Stefano Manzi moved up to Moto2 with Sky Racing Team VR46.
- Miguel Oliveira switched team to Red Bull KTM Ajo, with 2016 Moto3 champion Brad Binder who has been promoted to Ajo's Moto2 team as Oliveira's teammate. Both will fill the spot vacated by Johann Zarco who moved up to MotoGP with Monster Yamaha Tech 3 after winning two consecutive Moto2 titles.
- Xavier Siméon switched from QMMF Racing Team to Tasca Racing Scuderia Moto2 for 2017 as a replacement for Remy Gardner.
- Fabio Quartararo moved up to Moto2 with Páginas Amarillas HP 40, filling the seat vacated by Álex Rins who moved up to MotoGP with Team Suzuki Ecstar.
- After spending his entire Moto2 career with Technomag (including after their merger with Interwetten Paddock in 2015), Dominique Aegerter has switched teams to Kiefer Racing.
- Andrea Locatelli moved up to Moto2 with the Italtrans Racing Team.
- Yonny Hernández joined AGR Team after losing his MotoGP seat at Pull & Bear Aspar Team to Karel Abraham, replacing Axel Pons who switched teams to RW Racing GP.
- Tetsuta Nagashima returned to Moto2 full-time with SAG Team, replacing Jesko Raffin who switched teams to CarXpert Interwetten.
- CarXpert Interwetten promotes Iker Lecuona with a full-season seat in the team after Lecuona becoming the replacement rider for Dominique Aegerter in 2016.
- Khairul Idham Pawi moved up to Moto2 with Idemitsu Honda Team Asia.
- Robin Mulhauser left Moto2 for the Supersport World Championship.
- 2016 FIM Europe Supersport Cup champion Axel Bassani joined Moto2 with Speed Up Racing.

==== Mid-season changes ====
- Danny Kent surprisingly left Kiefer Racing after not starting the Grand Prix of the Americas due to 'irreconcilable differences'. Federico Fuligni temporarily replaced him in Jerez before Kiefer Racing announced that Tarran Mackenzie will replace Kent for the remainder of the season. Kent returned to Moto2 with GaragePlus Interwetten replacing injured Iker Lecuona at the Italian Grand Prix. At the Austrian Grand Prix, Kent rejoined Moto2 to replace Marcel Schrötter at Dynavolt Intact GP.
- Ricard Cardús replaced Brad Binder at Red Bull KTM Ajo for 3 rounds. He also replaced Thomas Lüthi at CarXpert Interwetten in Valencia.
- Axel Bassani left Speed Up Racing after the French Grand Prix due to his bad results with the team, so he was replaced by Augusto Fernández for the rest of the season.
- Yonny Hernández left the AGR Team midway through the season due to inconsistent race results, managing only 16 points over 9 races. He was replaced by the American Joe Roberts until the Aragon Grand Prix, when the AGR Team folded.

== Results and standings ==
=== Grands Prix ===
Round	Grand Prix	Pole position	Fastest lap	Winning rider	Winning team	Winning constructor	Report
1	Qatar motorcycle Grand Prix	(Italy) Franco Morbidelli (Note: Grid formed by each rider's best time from any of the three free practice sessions held, after rain cancelled the planned qualifying session.)	(Italy) Franco Morbidelli	(Italy) Franco Morbidelli	(Belgium) EG 0,0 Marc VDS	(Germany) Kalex	Report
2	(Argentina) Argentine Republic motorcycle Grand Prix	(Portugal) Miguel Oliveira	(Portugal) Miguel Oliveira	(Italy) Franco Morbidelli	(Belgium) EG 0,0 Marc VDS	(Germany) Kalex	Report
3	(United States) Motorcycle Grand Prix of the Americas	(Italy) Franco Morbidelli	(Italy) Franco Morbidelli	(Italy) Franco Morbidelli	(Belgium) EG 0,0 Marc VDS	(Germany) Kalex	Report
4	(Spain) Spanish motorcycle Grand Prix	(Spain) Álex Márquez	(Italy) Franco Morbidelli	(Spain) Álex Márquez	(Belgium) EG 0,0 Marc VDS	(Germany) Kalex	Report
5	(France) French motorcycle Grand Prix	(Switzerland) Thomas Lüthi	(Italy) Franco Morbidelli	(Italy) Franco Morbidelli	(Belgium) EG 0,0 Marc VDS	(Germany) Kalex	Report
6	(Italy) Italian motorcycle Grand Prix	(Italy) Franco Morbidelli	(Switzerland) Thomas Lüthi	(Italy) Mattia Pasini	(Italy) Italtrans Racing Team	(Germany) Kalex	Report
7	(Catalonia) Catalan motorcycle Grand Prix	(Spain) Álex Márquez	(Spain) Álex Márquez	(Spain) Álex Márquez	(Belgium) EG 0,0 Marc VDS	(Germany) Kalex	Report
8	(Netherlands) Dutch TT	(Italy) Franco Morbidelli	(Italy) Franco Morbidelli	(Italy) Franco Morbidelli	(Belgium) EG 0,0 Marc VDS	(Germany) Kalex	Report
9	(Germany) German motorcycle Grand Prix	(Italy) Franco Morbidelli	(Portugal) Miguel Oliveira	(Italy) Franco Morbidelli	(Belgium) EG 0,0 Marc VDS	(Germany) Kalex	Report
10	Czech Republic motorcycle Grand Prix	(Italy) Mattia Pasini	(Italy) Franco Morbidelli	(Switzerland) Thomas Lüthi	(Switzerland) CarXpert Interwetten	(Germany) Kalex	Report
11	(Austria) Austrian motorcycle Grand Prix	(Italy) Mattia Pasini	(Spain) Álex Márquez	(Italy) Franco Morbidelli	(Belgium) EG 0,0 Marc VDS	(Germany) Kalex	Report
12	(United Kingdom) British motorcycle Grand Prix	(Italy) Mattia Pasini	(Italy) Franco Morbidelli	(Japan) Takaaki Nakagami	(Japan) Idemitsu Honda Team Asia	(Germany) Kalex	Report
13	San Marino and Rimini Riviera motorcycle Grand Prix	(Italy) Mattia Pasini	(South Africa) Brad Binder	(Switzerland) Thomas Lüthi	(Switzerland) CarXpert Interwetten	(Germany) Kalex	Report
14	Aragon motorcycle Grand Prix	(Portugal) Miguel Oliveira	(Italy) Mattia Pasini	(Italy) Franco Morbidelli	(Belgium) EG 0,0 Marc VDS	(Germany) Kalex	Report
15	(Japan) Japanese motorcycle Grand Prix	(Japan) Takaaki Nakagami	(Spain) Álex Márquez	(Spain) Álex Márquez	(Belgium) EG 0,0 Marc VDS	(Germany) Kalex	Report
16	(Australia) Australian motorcycle Grand Prix	(Italy) Mattia Pasini	(South Africa) Brad Binder	(Portugal) Miguel Oliveira	(Finland) Red Bull KTM Ajo	(Austria) KTM	Report
17	(Malaysia) Malaysian motorcycle Grand Prix	(Italy) Franco Morbidelli	(Portugal) Miguel Oliveira	(Portugal) Miguel Oliveira	(Finland) Red Bull KTM Ajo	(Austria) KTM	Report
18	Valencian Community motorcycle Grand Prix	(Spain) Álex Márquez	(Italy) Franco Morbidelli	(Portugal) Miguel Oliveira	(Finland) Red Bull KTM Ajo	(Austria) KTM	Report

=== Riders' standings ===
Scoring system

Points were awarded to the top fifteen finishers. A rider had to finish the race to earn points.

Position	**1st**	**2nd**	**3rd**	**4th**	**5th**	**6th**	**7th**	**8th**	**9th**	**10th**	**11th**	**12th**	**13th**	**14th**	**15th**
Points	25	20	16	13	11	10	9	8	7	6	5	4	3	2	1

Pos	Rider	Bike	QAT (Qatar)	ARG (Argentina)	AME (United States)	SPA (Spain)	FRA (France)	ITA (Italy)	CAT (Catalonia)	NED (Netherlands)	GER (Germany)	CZE (Czech Republic)	AUT (Austria)	GBR (United Kingdom)	RSM (San Marino)	ARA (Aragon)	JPN (Japan)	AUS (Australia)	MAL (Malaysia)	VAL (Valencian Community)	Pts
1	(Italy) Franco Morbidelli	Kalex	**1**	1	**1**	Ret	1	**4**	5	**1**	**1**	8	1	3	Ret	1	8	3	**3**	2	308
2	(Switzerland) Thomas Lüthi	Kalex	2	3	2	8	**3**	2	2	2	Ret	1	3	4	1	4	11	10	DNS		243
3	(Portugal) Miguel Oliveira	KTM	4	**2**	6	3	17	5	3	5	2	3	Ret	8	Ret	**3**	7	1	1	1	241
4	(Spain) Álex Márquez	Kalex	5	21	4	**1**	4	3	**1**	6	Ret	2	2	14	DNS	Ret	1	6	Ret	**5**	201
5	(Italy) Francesco Bagnaia	Kalex	12	7	16	2	2	22	13	10	3	7	4	5	3	10	4	12	5	4	174
6	(Italy) Mattia Pasini	Kalex	24	20	22	4	5	1	DSQ	4	5	**Ret**	**5**	**2**	**Ret**	2	5	**Ret**	4	19	148
7	(Japan) Takaaki Nakagami	Kalex	3	Ret	3	21	7	Ret	10	3	10	24	6	1	10	8	**6**	Ret	Ret	7	137
8	(South Africa) Brad Binder	KTM	20	9				10	17	13	7	12	7	9	4	5	Ret	2	2	3	125
9	(Italy) Simone Corsi	Speed Up	17	6	7	Ret	8	8	11	Ret	4	6	11	6	7	7	21	7	11	9	117
10	(Malaysia) Hafizh Syahrin	Kalex	Ret	10	11	13	11	12	9	8	11	15	10	17	2	16	3	16	6	6	106
11	(Spain) Xavi Vierge	Tech 3	9	5	9	Ret	9	DNS	8	DNS		5	Ret	12	14	14	2	5	8	Ret	98
12	(Switzerland) Dominique Aegerter	Suter	11	14	5	7	6	7	16	12	Ret	Ret	9	10	DSQ	12	9	8	WD	10	88
13	(France) Fabio Quartararo	Kalex	7	Ret	12	16	18	18	7	9	13	20	Ret	16	6	11	19	Ret	7	8	64
14	(Spain) Jorge Navarro	Kalex	Ret	15	15	12	Ret	9	6	15	6	11	8	13	Ret	6	28	Ret		Ret	60
15	(Italy) Luca Marini	Kalex	6	12	10	5	Ret	6	DNS	Ret	DNS	4	Ret	11	Ret	Ret	Ret	23	Ret	23	59
16	(Italy) Lorenzo Baldassarri	Kalex	8	4	Ret	11	Ret	Ret	4	DNS		18	Ret	29	Ret	13	10	14	Ret	15	51
17	(Germany) Marcel Schrötter	Suter	16	11	8	6	12	11	Ret	11	9	DNS				Ret	13	Ret	17	13	50
18	(Germany) Sandro Cortese	Suter	22	8	23	Ret	14	19	Ret	Ret	8	Ret	Ret	Ret	5	9	Ret	9	Ret	Ret	43
19	(Spain) Axel Pons	Kalex	10	Ret	18	10	15	21	18	22	DNS	16	13	15	DNS	Ret	18	11	Ret	11	27
20	(Switzerland) Jesko Raffin	Kalex	14	13	21	20	23	23	23	17	16	29	18	27	9	23	25	4	15	21	26
21	(Australia) Remy Gardner	Tech 3	Ret	Ret		22	20	14	19	16	12	9	15	20	12	20	12	15	Ret	22	23
22	(Spain) Isaac Viñales	Kalex	21	17	17	18	Ret	13	12	Ret	22	25	Ret	18	Ret	Ret	24	19	9	12	18
23	(Belgium) Xavier Siméon	Kalex	15	Ret	13	19	16	15	20	7	14	23	Ret		Ret	25	Ret	DNS		Ret	16
24	(Colombia) Yonny Hernández	Kalex	18	22	Ret	9	10	17	15	14	17										16
25	(Italy) Stefano Manzi	Kalex	29	23	Ret	25	Ret	Ret	Ret	20	15	21	Ret	7	Ret	15	26	13	Ret	Ret	14
26	(Japan) Tetsuta Nagashima	Kalex	19	19	19	15	21	24	26	21	18	17	12	19	13	18	20	18	10	26	14
27	(Malaysia) Khairul Idham Pawi	Kalex	28	24	25	Ret	22	26	25	26	20	14	17	28	8	Ret	23	21	Ret	25	10
28	(Italy) Andrea Locatelli	Kalex	27	Ret	20	26	19	16	14	18	Ret	13	Ret	23	Ret	19	Ret	Ret	13	16	8
29	(Spain) Ricard Cardús	Speed Up	25																		7
29	(Spain) Ricard Cardús	KTM			14	14	13														7
29	(Spain) Ricard Cardús	Kalex																		Ret	7
30	(United States) Joe Roberts	Kalex										10	19	21	Ret	26					6
31	(Spain) Augusto Fernández	Speed Up						25	21	19	DSQ	27	16	26	Ret	22	16	17	12	14	6
32	(San Marino) Alex de Angelis	Kalex												24					18		5
32	(San Marino) Alex de Angelis	Suter													11						5
33	(United Kingdom) Danny Kent	Suter	13	Ret	DNS								DNS								3
33	(United Kingdom) Danny Kent	Kalex						Ret													3
34	(Spain) Edgar Pons	Kalex	26	16	Ret	17	25	20	22	24	19	28	14	22	Ret	17	27	Ret	16	20	2
35	(Spain) Iker Lecuona	Kalex			DNS	Ret	DNS		24	23	21	19	21	Ret	Ret	21	17	20	14	18	2
36	(Japan) Ikuhiro Enokido	Kalex															14				2
37	(United Kingdom) Tarran Mackenzie	Suter					Ret	27	Ret	25	23	26	20	30	Ret	27	15	22	WD	24	1
38	(Italy) Federico Fuligni	Suter				24															1
38	(Italy) Federico Fuligni	Kalex						28	27		24				15	Ret					1
39	(Brazil) Eric Granado	Kalex																		17	0
40	(Spain) Julián Simón	Kalex	23	18																	0
40	(Spain) Julián Simón	Tech 3			Ret																0
41	(Czech Republic) Karel Hanika	Kalex										22									0
42	(Japan) Ryo Mizuno	Kalex															22				0
43	(Italy) Axel Bassani	Speed Up		25	24	23	24														0
44	(South Africa) Steven Odendaal	NTS														24					0
45	(United Kingdom) Jake Dixon	Suter												25						DNS	0
	(Qatar) Saeed Al Sulaiti	Speed Up	Ret																		0
	(Spain) Héctor Garzó	Tech 3									Ret										0
	(Indonesia) Dimas Ekky Pratama	Kalex																	Ret		0
	(Qatar) Nasser Al Malki	Speed Up	DNS																		0
Pos	Rider	Bike	QAT (Qatar)	ARG (Argentina)	AME (United States)	SPA (Spain)	FRA (France)	ITA (Italy)	CAT (Catalonia)	NED (Netherlands)	GER (Germany)	CZE (Czech Republic)	AUT (Austria)	GBR (United Kingdom)	RSM (San Marino)	ARA (Aragon)	JPN (Japan)	AUS (Australia)	MAL (Malaysia)	VAL (Valencian Community)	Pts

Colour	Result
Gold	Winner
Silver	Second place
Bronze	Third place
Green	Points classification
Blue	Non-points classification
Blue	Non-classified finish (NC)
Purple	Retired, not classified (Ret)
Red	Did not qualify (DNQ)
Red	Did not pre-qualify (DNPQ)
Black	Disqualified (DSQ)
White	Did not start (DNS)
White	Withdrew (WD)
White	Race cancelled (C)
Blank	Did not practice (DNP)
Blank	Did not arrive (DNA)
Blank	Excluded (EX)

**Bold** – Pole
Italics – Fastest Lap
Light blue – Rookie

=== Constructors' standings ===
Each constructor received the same number of points as their best placed rider in each race.

Pos	Constructor	QAT (Qatar)	ARG (Argentina)	AME (United States)	SPA (Spain)	FRA (France)	ITA (Italy)	CAT (Catalonia)	NED (Netherlands)	GER (Germany)	CZE (Czech Republic)	AUT (Austria)	GBR (United Kingdom)	RSM (San Marino)	ARA (Aragon)	JPN (Japan)	AUS (Australia)	MAL (Malaysia)	VAL (Valencian Community)	Pts
1	(Germany) Kalex	1	1	1	1	1	1	1	1	1	1	1	1	1	1	1	3	3	2	427
2	(Austria) KTM	4	2	6	3	13	5	3	5	2	3	7	8	4	3	7	1	1	1	266
3	(Switzerland) Suter	11	8	5	6	6	7	16	11	8	26	9	10	5	9	9	8	17	10	120
4	(Italy) Speed Up	17	6	7	23	8	8	11	19	4	6	11	6	7	7	16	7	11	7	117
5	(France) Tech 3	9	5	9	22	7	14	8	16	12	5	15	12	12	14	2	5	8	22	107
	(Japan) NTS														24					0
Pos	Constructor	QAT (Qatar)	ARG (Argentina)	AME (United States)	SPA (Spain)	FRA (France)	ITA (Italy)	CAT (Catalonia)	NED (Netherlands)	GER (Germany)	CZE (Czech Republic)	AUT (Austria)	GBR (United Kingdom)	RSM (San Marino)	ARA (Aragon)	JPN (Japan)	AUS (Australia)	MAL (Malaysia)	VAL (Valencian Community)	Pts
