= 2023 Supersport World Championship =

Twenty-sixth season of the Supersport World Championship

2023 Supersport World Championship
Previous:	2022	Next:	2024
Support series: Superbike World Championship; Supersport 300 World Championship; Yamaha R3 bLU cRU World Cup

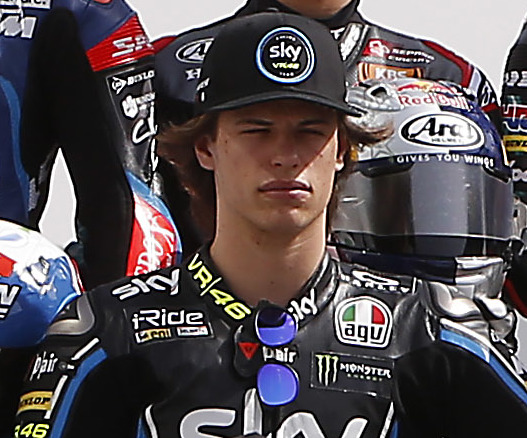
Nicolò Bulega (pictured in 2018) was the 2023 Supersport Champion

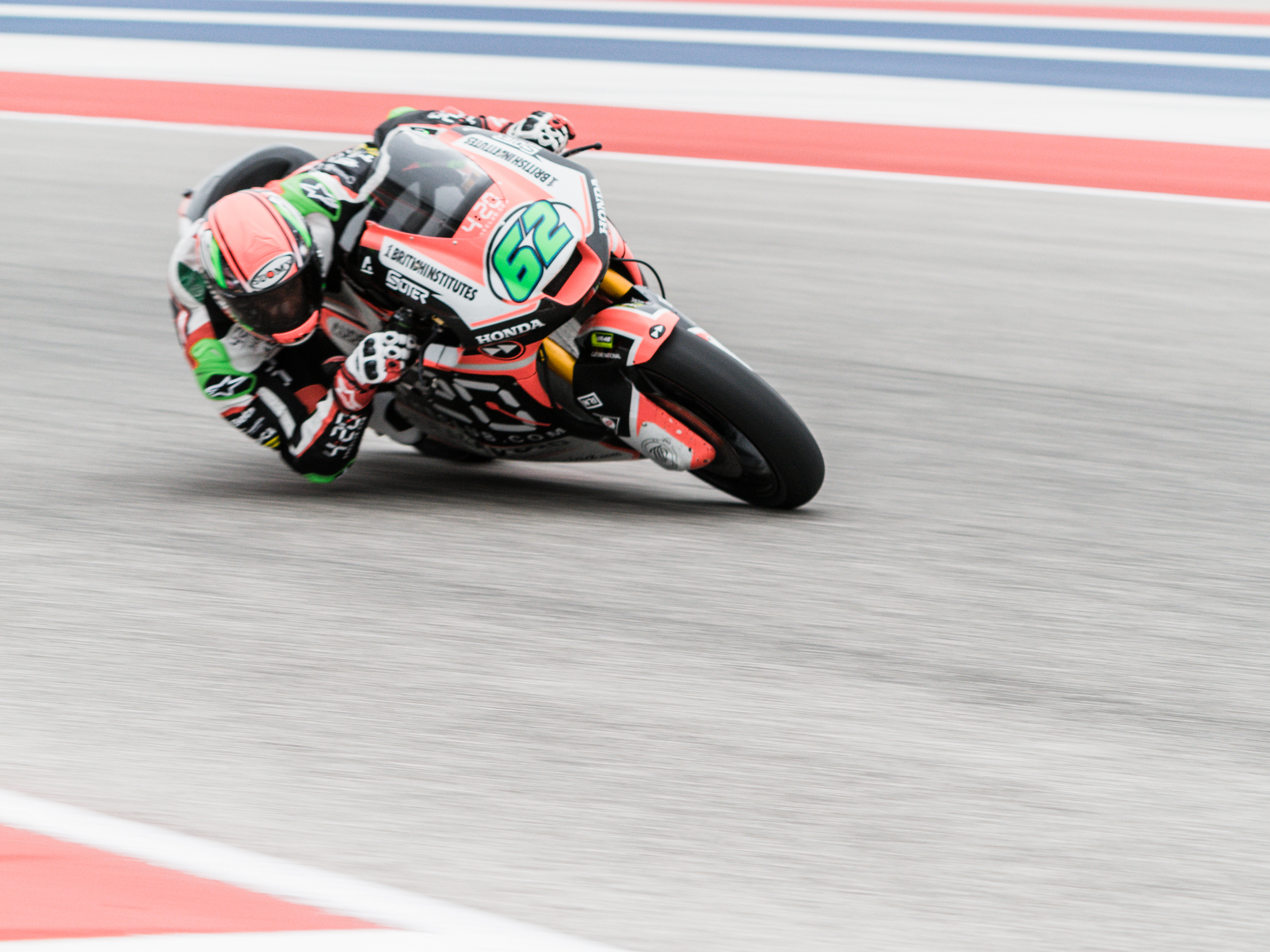
Stefano Manzi (pictured in 2018) finished second

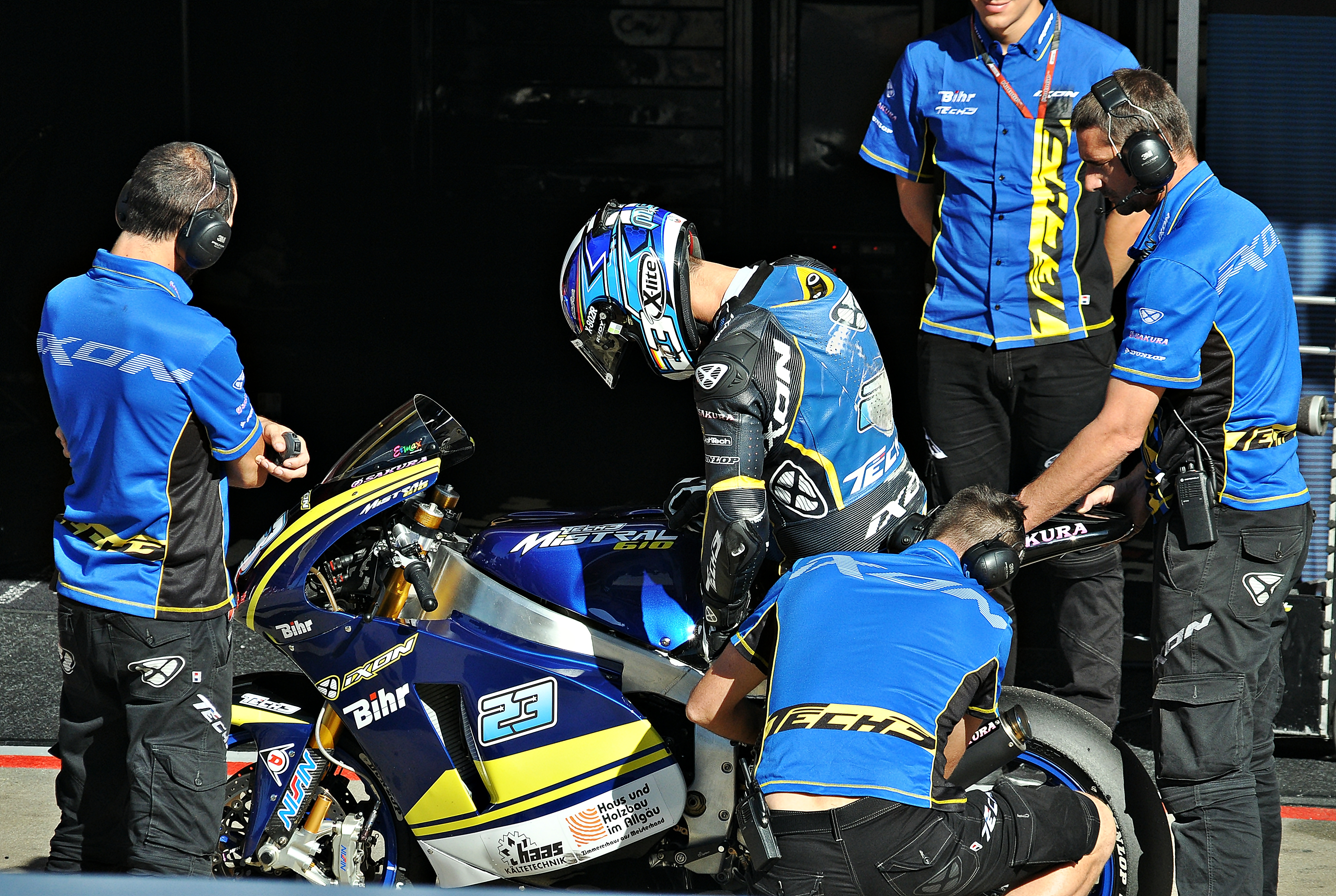
Marcel Schrötter (pictured in 2015) finished third

The 2023 Supersport World Championship was the twenty-seventh season of the Supersport World Championship, the twenty-fifth held under this name. The championship was won by Nicolò Bulega at the Portuguese round.

== Race calendar and results ==
The provisional 2023 season calendar was announced on 8 November 2022. It was then updated on 28 February 2023 to announce the seventh round at Imola Circuit on 14–16 July. It was updated again on 24 July, the Argentinian round at Circuito San Juan Villicum was cancelled due to the political reasons. On 2 August, it was announced that Circuito de Jerez will be the Argentina Round's replacement, making it the track's return to the championship with the last one being held in 2021.

2023 calendar
Round			Country	Circuit	Date	Superpole	Fastest lap	Winning rider	Winning team	Winning constructor	Ref
1	R1	Australian Round	Australia	Phillip Island Grand Prix Circuit	25 February	(Italy) Stefano Manzi	(Italy) Nicolò Bulega	(Italy) Nicolò Bulega	Aruba Racing WorldSSP Team	(Italy) Ducati	
1	R2	Australian Round	Australia	Phillip Island Grand Prix Circuit	26 February	(Italy) Stefano Manzi	(Italy) Stefano Manzi	(Italy) Nicolò Bulega	Aruba Racing WorldSSP Team	(Italy) Ducati	
2	R1	Indonesian Round	Indonesia	Pertamina Mandalika International Street Circuit	4 March	(Italy) Nicolò Bulega	(Turkey) Can Öncü	(Turkey) Can Öncü	Kawasaki Puccetti Racing	(Japan) Kawasaki	
2	R2	Indonesian Round	Indonesia	Pertamina Mandalika International Street Circuit	5 March	(Italy) Nicolò Bulega	(Italy) Stefano Manzi	(Italy) Federico Caricasulo	Althea Racing	(Italy) Ducati	
3	R1	Dutch Round	Netherlands	TT Circuit Assen	22 April	(Italy) Nicolò Bulega	(Italy) Nicolò Bulega	(Italy) Nicolò Bulega	Aruba Racing WorldSSP Team	(Italy) Ducati	
3	R2	Dutch Round	Netherlands	TT Circuit Assen	23 April	(Italy) Nicolò Bulega	(Italy) Nicolò Bulega	(Italy) Nicolò Bulega	Aruba Racing WorldSSP Team	(Italy) Ducati	
4	R1	Catalunya Round	Spain	Circuit de Barcelona-Catalunya	6 May	(Italy) Nicolò Bulega	(Turkey) Bahattin Sofuoğlu	(Italy) Nicolò Bulega	Aruba Racing WorldSSP Team	(Italy) Ducati	
4	R2	Catalunya Round	Spain	Circuit de Barcelona-Catalunya	7 May	(Italy) Nicolò Bulega	(Italy) Nicolò Bulega	(Turkey) Bahattin Sofuoğlu	MV Agusta Reparto Corse	(Italy) MV Agusta	
5	R1	Emilia-Romagna Round	Italy	Misano World Circuit Marco Simoncelli	3 June	(Italy) Nicolò Bulega	(Italy) Federico Caricasulo	(Italy) Nicolò Bulega	Aruba Racing WorldSSP Team	(Italy) Ducati	
5	R2	Emilia-Romagna Round	Italy	Misano World Circuit Marco Simoncelli	4 June	(Italy) Nicolò Bulega	(Italy) Federico Caricasulo	(Italy) Stefano Manzi	Ten Kate Racing Yamaha	(Japan) Yamaha	
6	R1	UK Round	United Kingdom	Donington Park	1 July	(Italy) Nicolò Bulega	(Italy) Nicolò Bulega	(Italy) Nicolò Bulega	Aruba Racing WorldSSP Team	(Italy) Ducati	
6	R2	UK Round	United Kingdom	Donington Park	2 July	(Italy) Nicolò Bulega	(Italy) Nicolò Bulega	(Italy) Nicolò Bulega	Aruba Racing WorldSSP Team	(Italy) Ducati	
7	R1	Italian Round	Italy	Imola Circuit	15 July	(Italy) Federico Caricasulo	(Italy) Stefano Manzi	(Italy) Stefano Manzi	Ten Kate Racing Yamaha	(Japan) Yamaha	
7	R2	Italian Round	Italy	Imola Circuit	16 July	(Italy) Federico Caricasulo	(Italy) Stefano Manzi	(Italy) Stefano Manzi	Ten Kate Racing Yamaha	(Japan) Yamaha	
8	R1	Czech Round	Czech Republic	Autodrom Most	29 July	(Italy) Nicolò Bulega	(Italy) Nicolò Bulega	(Italy) Nicolò Bulega	Aruba Racing WorldSSP Team	(Italy) Ducati	
8	R2	Czech Round	Czech Republic	Autodrom Most	30 July	(Italy) Nicolò Bulega	(Italy) Nicolò Bulega	(United Kingdom) Tarran Mackenzie	Petronas MIE – MS Racing Honda Team	(Japan) Honda	
9	R1	French Round	France	Circuit de Nevers Magny-Cours	9 September	(Italy) Nicolò Bulega	(France) Valentin Debise	(Italy) Nicolò Bulega	Aruba Racing WorldSSP Team	(Italy) Ducati	
9	R2	French Round	France	Circuit de Nevers Magny-Cours	10 September	(Italy) Nicolò Bulega	(France) Valentin Debise	(Italy) Nicolò Bulega	Aruba Racing WorldSSP Team	(Italy) Ducati	
10	R1	Aragon Round	Spain	MotorLand Aragón	23 September	(Italy) Nicolò Bulega	(Italy) Nicolò Bulega	(Italy) Nicolò Bulega	Aruba Racing WorldSSP Team	(Italy) Ducati	
10	R2	Aragon Round	Spain	MotorLand Aragón	24 September	(Italy) Nicolò Bulega	(Italy) Nicolò Bulega	(Italy) Nicolò Bulega	Aruba Racing WorldSSP Team	(Italy) Ducati	
11	R1	Portuguese Round	Portugal	Algarve International Circuit	30 September	(Italy) Nicolò Bulega	(Italy) Yari Montella	(Italy) Nicolò Bulega	Aruba Racing WorldSSP Team	(Italy) Ducati	
11	R2	Portuguese Round	Portugal	Algarve International Circuit	1 October	(Italy) Nicolò Bulega	(Italy) Stefano Manzi	(Italy) Stefano Manzi	Ten Kate Racing Yamaha	(Japan) Yamaha	
12	R1	Spanish Round	Spain	Circuito de Jerez	28 October (Note: The Spanish round was added to the calendar on 2 August 2023. It replaced the Argentinian round which was cancelled due to political reasons.)	(Italy) Nicolò Bulega	(Italy) Nicolò Bulega	(Italy) Nicolò Bulega	Aruba Racing WorldSSP Team	(Italy) Ducati	
12	R2	Spanish Round	Spain	Circuito de Jerez	29 October	(Italy) Nicolò Bulega	(Turkey) Can Öncü	(Italy) Nicolò Bulega	Aruba Racing WorldSSP Team	(Italy) Ducati	

== Entry list ==
2023 entry list
Team	Constructor	Motorcycle	No.	Rider	Class	Rounds
Althea Racing	Ducati	Panigale V2	64	(Italy) Federico Caricasulo		All
Aruba Racing WorldSSP Team	Ducati	Panigale V2	11	(Italy) Nicolò Bulega		All
Barni Spark Racing Team	Ducati	Panigale V2	55	(Italy) Yari Montella		1, 3–12
D34G Racing	Ducati	Panigale V2	17	(United Kingdom) John McPhee		10–11
D34G Racing	Ducati	Panigale V2	32	(Australia) Oli Bayliss		1–7, 12
D34G Racing	Ducati	Panigale V2	37	(Spain) José Luis Pérez González		12
D34G Racing	Ducati	Panigale V2	47	(Austria) Andreas Kofler		8–9
D34G Racing	Ducati	Panigale V2	73	(Austria) Maximilian Kofler	C	3–11
Ducati Zaragoza	Ducati	Panigale V2	76	(Spain) Julián Giral		10
Orelac Racing VerdNatura	Ducati	Panigale V2	3	(Italy) Raffaele De Rosa		All
Orelac Racing VerdNatura	Ducati	Panigale V2	22	(Italy) Federico Fuligni	C	3–9, 11
Petronas MIE – MS Racing Honda Team	Honda	CBR600RR	7	(Malaysia) Adam Norrodin		1–9
Petronas MIE – MS Racing Honda Team	Honda	CBR600RR	26	(Malaysia) Ibrahim Norrodin		10, 12
Petronas MIE – MS Racing Honda Team	Honda	CBR600RR	26	(Malaysia) Ibrahim Norrodin		11
Petronas MIE – MS Racing Honda Team	Honda	CBR600RR	88	(Italy) Andrea Migno		11
Petronas MIE – MS Racing Honda Team	Honda	CBR600RR	89	(Malaysia) Khairul Idham Pawi		12
Petronas MIE – MS Racing Honda Team	Honda	CBR600RR	95	(United Kingdom) Tarran Mackenzie		All
Kawasaki Puccetti Racing	Kawasaki	ZX-6R	14	(France) Lucas Mahias		4–8
Kawasaki Puccetti Racing	Kawasaki	ZX-6R	61	(Turkey) Can Öncü		1–3, 9–12
Motozoo Racing by Puccetti	Kawasaki	ZX-6R	68	(Australia) Luke Power	C	3–11
Motozoo Racing by Puccetti	Kawasaki	ZX-6R	69	(United Kingdom) Tom Booth-Amos	C	3–11
MTM Kawasaki	Kawasaki	ZX-6R	77	(Philippines) TJ Alberto		2
MTM Kawasaki	Kawasaki	ZX-6R	99	(Spain) Adrián Huertas		1, 3–12
Prodina Kawasaki Racing WorldSSP	Kawasaki	ZX-6R	12	(Italy) Gabrielle Giannini		12
Prodina Kawasaki Racing WorldSSP	Kawasaki	ZX-6R	16	(Japan) Yuta Okaya	C	3–11 (Note: Yuta Okaya competed in the first Friday practice session during round 7 at Imola but was withdrawn after declared unfit due to health issues. He will be replaced for the rest of the weekend by Stefano Valtulini.)
Prodina Kawasaki Racing WorldSSP	Kawasaki	ZX-6R	67	(Italy) Stefano Valtulini	C	7
Vince64 by Puccetti Racing	Kawasaki	ZX-6R	17	(United Kingdom) John McPhee		1–9
Vince64 by Puccetti Racing	Kawasaki	ZX-6R	35	(Italy) Leonardo Taccini		10–12
Extreme Racing Service	MV Agusta	F3 800 RR	13	(Italy) Luca Ottaviani		7
MV Agusta Reparto Corse	MV Agusta	F3 800 RR	23	(Germany) Marcel Schrötter		All
MV Agusta Reparto Corse	MV Agusta	F3 800 RR	54	(Turkey) Bahattin Sofuoğlu		All
Astro-JJR Suzuki	Suzuki	Suzuki GSX-R750	34	(Republic of Ireland) Rhys Irwin		6
PTR Triumph	Triumph	Street Triple RS 765	4	(United Kingdom) Harry Truelove		1–7
PTR Triumph	Triumph	Street Triple RS 765	50	(Czech Republic) Ondrej Vostatek		8–12
PTR Triumph	Triumph	Street Triple RS 765	66	(Finland) Niki Tuuli		All
Completely Motorbikes Triumph	Triumph	Street Triple RS 765	15	(Republic of Ireland) Eugene McManus		6
Altogo Racing Team	Yamaha	YZF-R6	40	(Italy) Simone Corsi		3, 5, 12
Arco YART Yamaha WorldSSP	Yamaha	YZF-R6	27	(Spain) Álvaro Díaz	C	3–12
Axon Seven Team	Yamaha	YZF-R6	42	(Italy) Marco Bussolotti		5
EAB Racing Team	Yamaha	YZF-R6	28	(Netherlands) Glenn van Straalen		All
Eder Racing	Yamaha	YZF-R6	36	(Austria) Thomas Gradinger		8
Evan Bros. WorldSSP Yamaha Team	Yamaha	YZF-R6	19	(Italy) Andrea Mantovani		1–6 (Note: Andrea Mantovani competed in the first Friday practice session during round 6 at Donington Park but was withdrawn after suffering injuries on FP1. He will be replaced for the rest of the weekend by Jack Kennedy.)
Evan Bros. WorldSSP Yamaha Team	Yamaha	YZF-R6	21	(Italy) Filippo Fuligni		7
Evan Bros. WorldSSP Yamaha Team	Yamaha	YZF-R6	31	(Spain) Adrián Fernández		4
Evan Bros. WorldSSP Yamaha Team	Yamaha	YZF-R6	48	(Italy) Lorenzo Dalla Porta		8–12
Evan Bros. WorldSSP Yamaha Team	Yamaha	YZF-R6	91	(Republic of Ireland) Jack Kennedy		6
GMT94 Yamaha	Yamaha	YZF-R6	86	(France) Johan Gimbert		5
GMT94 Yamaha	Yamaha	YZF-R6	86	(France) Johan Gimbert		9
GMT94 Yamaha	Yamaha	YZF-R6	94	(France) Valentin Debise		1–4, 6–12
J Angel Yamaha	Yamaha	YZF-R6	6	(Italy) Emanuele Pusceddu		7, 12
MDR Oftec Yamaha	Yamaha	YZF-R6	44	(Switzerland) Baris Sahin		4
MDR Oftec Yamaha	Yamaha	YZF-R6	72	(Spain) Yeray Ruiz		10–12
Orelac Racing Verdnatura Yamaha	Yamaha	YZF-R6	21	(Italy) Filippo Fuligni		12
Ten Kate Racing Yamaha	Yamaha	YZF-R6	9	(Spain) Jorge Navarro		All
Ten Kate Racing Yamaha	Yamaha	YZF-R6	62	(Italy) Stefano Manzi		All
VFT Racing Yamaha	Yamaha	YZF-R6	29	(Italy) Nicholas Spinelli		1–8, 10–12
VFT Racing Yamaha	Yamaha	YZF-R6	43	(Denmark) Simon Jespersen		9
VFT Racing Yamaha	Yamaha	YZF-R6	98	(Japan) Maiki Abe	C	3–11
Yamaha Thailand Racing Team	Yamaha	YZF-R6	24	(Thailand) Apiwat Wongthananon		1–4, 7, 12
Yamaha Thailand Racing Team	Yamaha	YZF-R6	25	(France) Andy Verdoïa		6–9
Yamaha Thailand Racing Team	Yamaha	YZF-R6	41	(Spain) Héctor Garzó		10
Yamaha Thailand Racing Team	Yamaha	YZF-R6	45	(Netherlands) Twan Smits		11
Yamaha Thailand Racing Team	Yamaha	YZF-R6	51	(Thailand) Anupab Sarmoon		All
Yamaha Thailand Racing Team	Yamaha	YZF-R6	56	(Thailand) Ratthapong Wilairot		5
YART – Yamaha WorldSSP Team	Yamaha	YZF-R6	71	(Australia) Tom Edwards	C	3–11
Moto Ain	Yamaha	YZF-R6	96	(France) Matthieu Gregorio		9
Team SWPN	Yamaha	YZF-R6	20	(Netherlands) Melvin van der Voort		12
Zeus Motorsport	Yamaha	YZF-R6	75	(Spain) Miquel Pons		12

Key
Regular rider
Wildcard rider
Replacement rider
C WorldSSP Challenge

=== Rider changes ===
- Dynavolt Triumph will have a new line-up, the riders of the team are Harry Truelove and Niki Tuuli.
- Jorge Navarro joined Ten Kate Racing Yamaha.
- Marcel Schrötter joined MV Agusta Reparto Corse, replacing Niki Tuuli.
- Valentin Debise joined GMT94 Yamaha, replacing Jules Cluzel who retired from racing.
- Luke Power joined Motozoo Racing by Puccetti.
- Yuta Okaya joined Prodina Racing WorldSSP.
- Yari Montella joined Barni Spark Racing Team, replacing Oli Bayliss.
- 2021 British Superbike Champion Tarran Mackenzie and Adam Norrodin include the line-up of the MIE MS Honda team.
- John McPhee switches from Moto3 to World Supersport Championship.
- Andrea Mantovani joined Evan Bros. WorldSSP Yamaha Team.
- The son of late former 500cc/MotoGP and World Superbike rider Norifumi Abe, Maiki Abe joins VFT Racing.
- Long-time Asia Road Racing Championship stalwart, Yamaha Thailand Racing Team joined Supersport World Championship full-time with Thai duo, Anupab Sarmoon and Apiwat Wongthananon.
- 2022 Supersport 300 World Champion Álvaro Díaz step up to Supersport World Championship with Arco YART Yamaha WorldSSP.

== Championship standings ==
Points

Position	**1st**	**2nd**	**3rd**	**4th**	**5th**	**6th**	**7th**	**8th**	**9th**	**10th**	**11th**	**12th**	**13th**	**14th**	**15th**
Points	25	20	16	13	11	10	9	8	7	6	5	4	3	2	1

=== Riders' championship ===
Pos.	Rider	Bike	PHI (Australia)		MAN (Indonesia)		ASS (Netherlands)		BAR (Spain)		MIS (Italy)		DON (United Kingdom)		IMO (Italy)		MOS (Czech Republic)		MAG (France)		ARA (Spain)		POR (Portugal)		JER (Spain)		Pts.
Pos.	Rider	Bike	R1	R2	R1	R2	R1	R2	R1	R2	R1	R2	R1	R2	R1	R2	R1	R2	R1	R2	R1	R2	R1	R2	R1	R2	Pts.
1	(Italy) Nicolò Bulega	Ducati	1	1	**5**	**3**	**1**	**1**	**1**	**Ret**	**1**	**2**	**1**	**1**	3	2	**1**	**16**	**1**	**1**	**1**	**1**	**1**	**2**	**1**	**1**	503
2	(Italy) Stefano Manzi	Yamaha	**6**	**2**	7	2	5	2	6	3	2	1	2	5	1	1	2	Ret	2	3	11	2	2	1	2	2	408
3	(Germany) Marcel Schrötter	MV Agusta	7	4	4	5	2	4	2	2	4	3	8	Ret	2	8	6	2	7	4	2	5	4	4	15	Ret	294
4	(Italy) Federico Caricasulo	Ducati	10	Ret	2	1	6	3	5	6	3	4	4	3	**Ret**	**Ret**	10	11	8	10	4	3	6	5	3	5	258
5	(France) Valentin Debise	Yamaha	13	8	6	Ret	4	6	8	4			10	7	Ret	7	11	12	3	2	10	7	5	Ret	5	6	181
6	(Turkey) Bahattin Sofuoğlu	MV Agusta	Ret	11	9	10	11	Ret	3	1	Ret	7	13	8	4	Ret	3	3	9	Ret	6	4	7	17	16	Ret	168
7	(Spain) Jorge Navarro	Yamaha	9	6	12	8	10	7	7	9	8	18	12	11	Ret	6	9	Ret	Ret	9	7	6	3	7	4	11	163
8	(Finland) Niki Tuuli	Triumph	4	9	3	6	12	5	10	8	9	10	15	12	Ret	DNS	7	9	5	5	9	Ret	9	10	9	12	162
9	(Italy) Yari Montella	Ducati	Ret	DNS			8	Ret	11	16	5	Ret	3	2	5	3	Ret	Ret	6	8	3	8	Ret	3	Ret	DNS	145
10	(Italy) Raffaele De Rosa	Ducati	17	7	Ret	7	9	9	15	10	Ret	26	7	9	6	5	4	10	16	Ret	5	9	8	8	7	Ret	138
11	(Netherlands) Glenn van Straalen	Yamaha	14	5	11	Ret	3	11	4	5	7	22	5	10	13	Ret	8	Ret	Ret	13	8	Ret	Ret	6	10	7	138
12	(Spain) Adrián Huertas	Kawasaki	Ret	DNS			13	8	12	12	11	5	6	4	10	4	5	15	4	7	Ret	Ret	Ret	Ret	6	4	134
13	(Turkey) Can Öncü	Kawasaki	Ret	3	1	4	7	Ret											17	14	17	17	14	15	11	3	89
14	(Italy) Nicholas Spinelli	Yamaha	2	NC	Ret	9	Ret	14	9	7	12	8	24	16	7	Ret	Ret	18			14	10	DNS	DNS	WD	WD	74
15	(United Kingdom) Tom Booth-Amos	Kawasaki					15	10	13	14	Ret	12	9	6	8	Ret	13	13	13	Ret	Ret	11	15	Ret			56
16	(United Kingdom) John McPhee	Kawasaki	3	12	10	11	Ret	17	19	Ret	19	19	20	18	Ret	14	19	4	15	19							55
16	(United Kingdom) John McPhee	Ducati																			Ret	13	13	14			55
17	(Italy) Lorenzo Dalla Porta	Yamaha															20	19	10	6	16	Ret	10	9	8	9	44
18	(United Kingdom) Tarran Mackenzie	Honda	5	16	14	14	20	20	27	23	Ret	Ret	Ret	23	21	Ret	17	1	24	20	26	22	22	20	19	14	42
19	(France) Lucas Mahias	Kawasaki							16	13	10	9	11	Ret	9	9	14	Ret									37
20	(Italy) Simone Corsi	Yamaha					16	13			6	6													12	10	33
21	(Australia) Oli Bayliss	Ducati	16	10	8	12	Ret		17	Ret	13	11	DNS		WD	WD									18	18	26
22	(Australia) Tom Edwards	Yamaha					Ret	15	14	11	16	13	14	14	16	DSQ	Ret	Ret	21	23	18	14	11	12			26
23	(Thailand) Anupab Sarmoon	Yamaha	8	14	13	15	19	18	21	19	24	17	Ret	19	18	Ret	22	8	23	22	19	18	17	18	14	17	24
24	(France) Andy Verdoïa	Yamaha											17	13	14	10	12	17	11	15							21
25	(Malaysia) Adam Norrodin	Honda	12	15	15	13	22	22	Ret	22	21	Ret	Ret	26	Ret	16	21	5	19	DNS							20
26	(Spain) Yeray Ruiz	Yamaha																			12	15	16	11	Ret	8	18
27	(Czech Republic) Ondrej Vostatek	Triumph															16	Ret	22	16	15	12	12	13	13	Ret	15
28	(Austria) Thomas Gradinger	Yamaha															24	6									10
29	(Italy) Federico Fuligni	Ducati					17	Ret	23	18	15	16	19	21	Ret	Ret	23	7	25	Ret	20	19	21	DNS			10
30	(Italy) Filippo Fuligni	Yamaha													11	11									24	16	10
31	(France) Johan Gimbert	Yamaha									17	20							12	11							9
32	(Italy) Andrea Mantovani	Yamaha	Ret	Ret	DSQ	17	14	12	20	17	14	15	WD	WD													9
33	(Switzerland) Simon Jespersen	Yamaha																	14	12							6
34	(Spain) Álvaro Díaz	Yamaha					DNQ	DNQ	26	20	Ret	21	Ret	20	Ret	13	Ret	DNS	27	21	13	16	23	16	23	21	6
35	(United Kingdom) Harry Truelove	Triumph	11	Ret	17	16	21	21	24	25	22	Ret	Ret	Ret	Ret	Ret											5
36	(Austria) Maximilian Kofler	Ducati					18	19	NC	24	18	Ret	23	22	17	12	18	20	26	Ret	21	20	19	22			4
37	(Italy) Luca Ottaviani	MV Agusta													12	Ret											4
38	(Thailand) Apiwat Wongthananon	Yamaha	15	13	DNS	Ret	Ret	16	Ret	Ret					WD	WD									17	DNS	4
39	(Netherlands) Melvin van der Voort	Yamaha																							Ret	13	3
40	(Austria) Andreas Kofler	Ducati															15	14	20	17							3
41	(Italy) Marco Bussolotti	Yamaha									Ret	14															2
42	(Spain) José Luis Pérez González	Ducati																							22	15	1
43	(Australia) Luke Power	Kawasaki					Ret	Ret	25	26	Ret	23	22	24	19	15	Ret	Ret	28	18	22	21	18	19			1
44	(Italy) Stefano Valtulini	Kawasaki													15	Ret											1
45	(Republic of Ireland) Rhys Irwin	Suzuki											16	15													1
46	(Spain) Adrián Fernández	Yamaha							18	15																	1
	(Philippines) TJ Alberto	Kawasaki			16	18																					0
	(Republic of Ireland) Jack Kennedy	Yamaha											18	17													0
	(Japan) Yuta Okaya	Kawasaki					23	23	22	21	20	27	21	25	WD	WD	25	21	18	24	24	24	25	25			0
	(Japan) Maiki Abe	Yamaha					DNQ	DNQ	Ret	27	Ret	24	DNQ	DNQ	20	Ret	26	22	DNS	DNS	DNS	DNS	26	26			0
	(Thailand) Ratthapong Wilairot	Yamaha									23	25															0
	(Switzerland) Baris Sahin	Yamaha							Ret	Ret																	0
	(Republic of Ireland) Eugene McManus	Triumph											Ret	Ret													0
	(Italy) Emanuele Pusceddu	Yamaha													Ret	Ret											0
	(France) Matthieu Gregorio	Yamaha																	Ret	DNS							0
	(Malaysia) Ibrahim Norrodin	Honda																			25	23	24	21	Ret	Ret	0
	(Italy) Leonardo Taccini	Kawasaki																			23	25	Ret	DNS	20	20	0
	(Spain) Héctor Garzó	Yamaha																			Ret	DNS					0
	(Spain) Julián Giral	Ducati																			DNQ	DNQ					0
	(Netherlands) Twan Smits	Yamaha																					20	24			0
	(Italy) Andrea Migno	Honda																					27	23			0
	(Malaysia) Khairul Idham Pawi	Honda																							21	19	0
	(Italy) Gabrielle Giannini	Kawasaki																							Ret	Ret	0
	(Spain) Miquel Pons	Yamaha																							Ret	DNS	0
Pos.	Rider	Bike	PHI (Australia)		MAN (Indonesia)		ASS (Netherlands)		BAR (Spain)		MIS (Italy)		DON (United Kingdom)		IMO (Italy)		MOS (Czech Republic)		MAG (France)		ARA (Spain)		POR (Portugal)		JER (Spain)		Pts.

Colour	Result
Gold	Winner
Silver	Second place
Bronze	Third place
Green	Points classification
Blue	Non-points classification
Blue	Non-classified finish (NC)
Purple	Retired, not classified (Ret)
Red	Did not qualify (DNQ)
Red	Did not pre-qualify (DNPQ)
Black	Disqualified (DSQ)
White	Did not start (DNS)
White	Withdrew (WD)
White	Race cancelled (C)
Blank	Did not practice (DNP)
Blank	Did not arrive (DNA)
Blank	Excluded (EX)

**Bold** – Pole position
Italics – Fastest lap

=== Teams' championship ===
Pos.	Team	Bike No.	PHI (Australia)		MAN (Indonesia)		ASS (Netherlands)		BAR (Spain)		MIS (Italy)		DON (United Kingdom)		IMO (Italy)		MOS (Czech Republic)		MAG (France)		ARA (Spain)		POR (Portugal)		JER (Spain)		Pts.
Pos.	Team	Bike No.	R1	R2	R1	R2	R1	R2	R1	R2	R1	R2	R1	R2	R1	R2	R1	R2	R1	R2	R1	R2	R1	R2	R1	R2	Pts.
1	Ten Kate Racing Yamaha	9	9	6	12	8	10	7	7	9	8	18	12	11	Ret	6	9	Ret	Ret	9	8	6	3	7	4	11	571
1	Ten Kate Racing Yamaha	62	**6**	**2**	7	2	5	2	6	3	2	1	2	5	1	1	2	Ret	2	3	11	2	2	1	2	2	571
2	Aruba.it Racing WorldSSP Team	11	1	1	**5**	**3**	**1**	**1**	**1**	**Ret**	**1**	**2**	**1**	**1**	3	2	**1**	**16**	**1**	**1**	**1**	**1**	**1**	**2**	**1**	**1**	503
3	MV Agusta Reparto Corse	23	7	4	4	5	2	4	2	2	4	3	8	Ret	2	8	6	2	7	4	2	5	4	4	15	Ret	462
3	MV Agusta Reparto Corse	54	Ret	11	9	10	11	Ret	3	1	Ret	7	13	8	9	Ret	3	3	9	Ret	6	4	7	17	16	Ret	462
4	Althea Racing	64	10	Ret	2	1	6	3	5	6	3	4	4	3	**Ret**	**Ret**	10	11	8	10	4	3	6	5	3	5	258
5	GMT94 Yamaha	86									17	20															190
5	GMT94 Yamaha	94	13	8	6	Ret	4	6	8	4			10	7	Ret	7	11	12	3	2	10	7	5	Ret	5	6	190
6	PTR Triumph	4	11	Ret	17	16	21	21	24	25	22	Ret	Ret	Ret	Ret	Ret											182
6	PTR Triumph	50															16	Ret	22	16	15	12	12	13	13	Ret	182
6	PTR Triumph	66	4	9	3	6	12	5	10	8	9	10	15	12	Ret	DNS	7	9	5	5	9	Ret	9	10	9	12	182
7	Barni Spark Racing Team	55	Ret	DNS			8	Ret	11	16	5	Ret	3	2	5	3	Ret	Ret	6	8	3	8	Ret	3	Ret	DNS	145
8	Orelac Racing VerdNatura	3	17	7	Ret	7	9	9	15	10	Ret	26	7	9	6	5	4	10	16	Ret	5	9	8	8	7	Ret	148
8	Orelac Racing VerdNatura	22					17	Ret	23	18	15	16	19	21	Ret	Ret	23	7	25	Ret	20	19	21	DNS			148
9	EAB Racing Team	28	14	5	11	Ret	3	11	4	5	7	22	5	10	13	Ret	8	Ret	Ret	13	7	Ret	Ret	6	10	7	136
10	MTM Kawasaki	77			16	18																					134
10	MTM Kawasaki	99	Ret	DNS			13	8	12	12	11	5	6	4	10	4	5	15	4	7	Ret	Ret	Ret	Ret	6	4	134
11	Kawasaki Puccetti Racing	14							16	13	10	9	11	Ret	9	9	14	Ret									126
11	Kawasaki Puccetti Racing	61	Ret	3	1	4	7	Ret											17	14	17	17	14	15	11	3	126
12	VFT Racing	29	2	NC	Ret	9	Ret	14	9	7	12	8	24	16	7	Ret	Ret	18			14	10	DNS	DNS	WD	WD	80
12	VFT Racing	43																	14	12							80
12	VFT Racing	98					DNQ	DNQ	Ret	27	Ret	24	DNQ	DNQ	20	Ret	26	22	DNS	DNS	DNS	DNS	26	26			80
13	Petronas MIE – MS Racing Honda Team	7	12	15	15	13	22	22	Ret	22	21	Ret	Ret	26	Ret	17	21	5	19	DNS							62
13	Petronas MIE – MS Racing Honda Team	26																			25	23	24	21	Ret	Ret	62
13	Petronas MIE – MS Racing Honda Team	88																					27	23			62
13	Petronas MIE – MS Racing Honda Team	89																							21	19	62
13	Petronas MIE – MS Racing Honda Team	95	5	16	14	14	20	20	27	23	Ret	Ret	Ret	23	21	Ret	17	1	24	20	26	22	22	20	19	14	62
14	Motozoo Racing by Puccetti	68					Ret	Ret	25	26	Ret	23	22	24	19	15	Ret	Ret	28	18	22	21	18	19			57
14	Motozoo Racing by Puccetti	69					15	10	13	14	Ret	12	9	6	8	Ret	13	13	13	Ret	Ret	11	15	Ret			57
15	Evan Bros. WorldSSP Yamaha Team	19	Ret	Ret	DSQ	17	14	12	20	17	14	15	WD	WD													64
15	Evan Bros. WorldSSP Yamaha Team	21													11	11											64
15	Evan Bros. WorldSSP Yamaha Team	31							18	15																	64
15	Evan Bros. WorldSSP Yamaha Team	48															20	19	10	6	16	Ret	10	9	8	9	64
15	Evan Bros. WorldSSP Yamaha Team	91											18	17													64
16	Yamaha Thailand Racing Team	15																			Ret	DNS					49
16	Yamaha Thailand Racing Team	24	15	13	DNS	Ret	Ret	16	Ret	Ret					WD	WD									17	DNS	49
16	Yamaha Thailand Racing Team	25											17	13	14	10	12	17	11	15							49
16	Yamaha Thailand Racing Team	45																					20	24			49
16	Yamaha Thailand Racing Team	51	8	14	13	15	19	18	21	19	24	17	Ret	19	18	Ret	22	8	23	22	19	18	17	18	14	17	49
16	Yamaha Thailand Racing Team	56									23	25															49
17	Vince64 by Puccetti Racing	17	3	12	10	11	Ret	17	19	Ret	19	19	20	18	Ret	14	19	4	15	19							47
17	Vince64 by Puccetti Racing	35																			23	25	Ret	DNS	20	20	47
18	D34G Racing	17																			Ret	13	13	14			42
18	D34G Racing	32	16	10	8	12	Ret		17	Ret	13	11	DNS		WD	WD									18	18	42
18	D34G Racing	37																							22	15	42
18	D34G Racing	47															15	14	20	17							42
18	D34G Racing	73					18	19	NC	24	18	Ret	23	22	17	12	18	20	26	Ret	22	20	19	22			42
19	Altogo Racing Team	40					16	13			6	6													12	10	33
20	YART – Yamaha WorldSSP Team	71					Ret	15	14	11	16	13	14	14	16	DSQ	Ret	Ret	21	23	18	14	11				26
21	MDR Oftec Yamaha	44							Ret	Ret																	18
21	MDR Oftec Yamaha	72																			12	15	16	11	Ret	8	18
22	Eder Racing	36															24	6									10
23	Arco YART Yamaha WorldSSP	27					DNQ	DNQ	26	20	Ret	21	Ret	20	Ret	13	Ret	DNS	27	21	13	16	23	16	23	21	6
24	Extreme Racing Service	13													12	Ret											4
25	Team SWPN	20																							Ret	13	3
26	Axon Seven Team	42									Ret	14															2
27	Astro-JJR Suzuki	34											16	15													1
28	Prodina Kawasaki Racing WorldSSP	20																							Ret	Ret	1
28	Prodina Kawasaki Racing WorldSSP	16					23	23	22	21	20	27	21	25	WD	WD	25	21	18	24	24	24	25	25			1
28	Prodina Kawasaki Racing WorldSSP	67													15	Ret											1
	Completely Motorbikes Triumph	15											Ret	Ret													0
	J Angel Yamaha	6													Ret	Ret											0
	Moto Ain	96																	Ret	DNS							0
	Ducati Zaragoza	76																			DNQ	DNQ					0
	Orelac Racing VerdNatura Yamaha	21																							24	16	0
	Zeus Motorsport	75																							Ret	DNS	0
Pos.	Team	Bike No.	PHI (Australia)		MAN (Indonesia)		ASS (Netherlands)		BAR (Spain)		MIS (Italy)		DON (United Kingdom)		IMO (Italy)		MOS (Czech Republic)		MAG (France)		ARA (Spain)		POR (Portugal)		JER (Spain)		Pts.

=== Manufacturers' championship ===
Pos.	Manufacturer	PHI (Australia)		MAN (Indonesia)		ASS (Netherlands)		BAR (Spain)		MIS (Italy)		DON (United Kingdom)		IMO (Italy)		MOS (Czech Republic)		MAG (France)		ARA (Spain)		POR (Portugal)		JER (Spain)		Pts.
Pos.	Manufacturer	R1	R2	R1	R2	R1	R2	R1	R2	R1	R2	R1	R2	R1	R2	R1	R2	R1	R2	R1	R2	R1	R2	R1	R2	Pts.
1	(Italy) Ducati	1	1	2	1	1	1	1	6	1	2	1	1	3	2	1	7	1	1	1	1	1	2	1	1	540
2	(Japan) Yamaha	2	2	6	2	3	2	4	3	2	1	2	5	1	1	2	6	2	3	7	2	2	1	2	2	445
3	(Italy) MV Agusta	7	4	4	5	2	4	2	1	4	3	8	8	2	8	3	2	7	4	2	4	4	4	15	Ret	315
4	(Japan) Kawasaki	3	3	1	4	7	8	12	12	10	5	6	4	8	4	5	4	4	7	22	11	14	15	6	3	236
5	(United Kingdom) Triumph	4	9	3	6	12	5	10	8	9	10	15	12	Ret	Ret	7	9	5	5	9	12	9	10	9	12	166
6	(Japan) Honda	5	15	14	13	20	20	27	22	21	Ret	Ret	23	21	17	17	1	19	20	25	22	22	20	19	14	44
7	(Japan) Suzuki											16	15													1
Pos.	Manufacturer	PHI (Australia)		MAN (Indonesia)		ASS (Netherlands)		BAR (Spain)		MIS (Italy)		DON (United Kingdom)		IMO (Italy)		MOS (Czech Republic)		MAG (France)		ARA (Spain)		POR (Portugal)		JER (Spain)		Pts.
