= Tarran Mackenzie =

British motorcycle racer

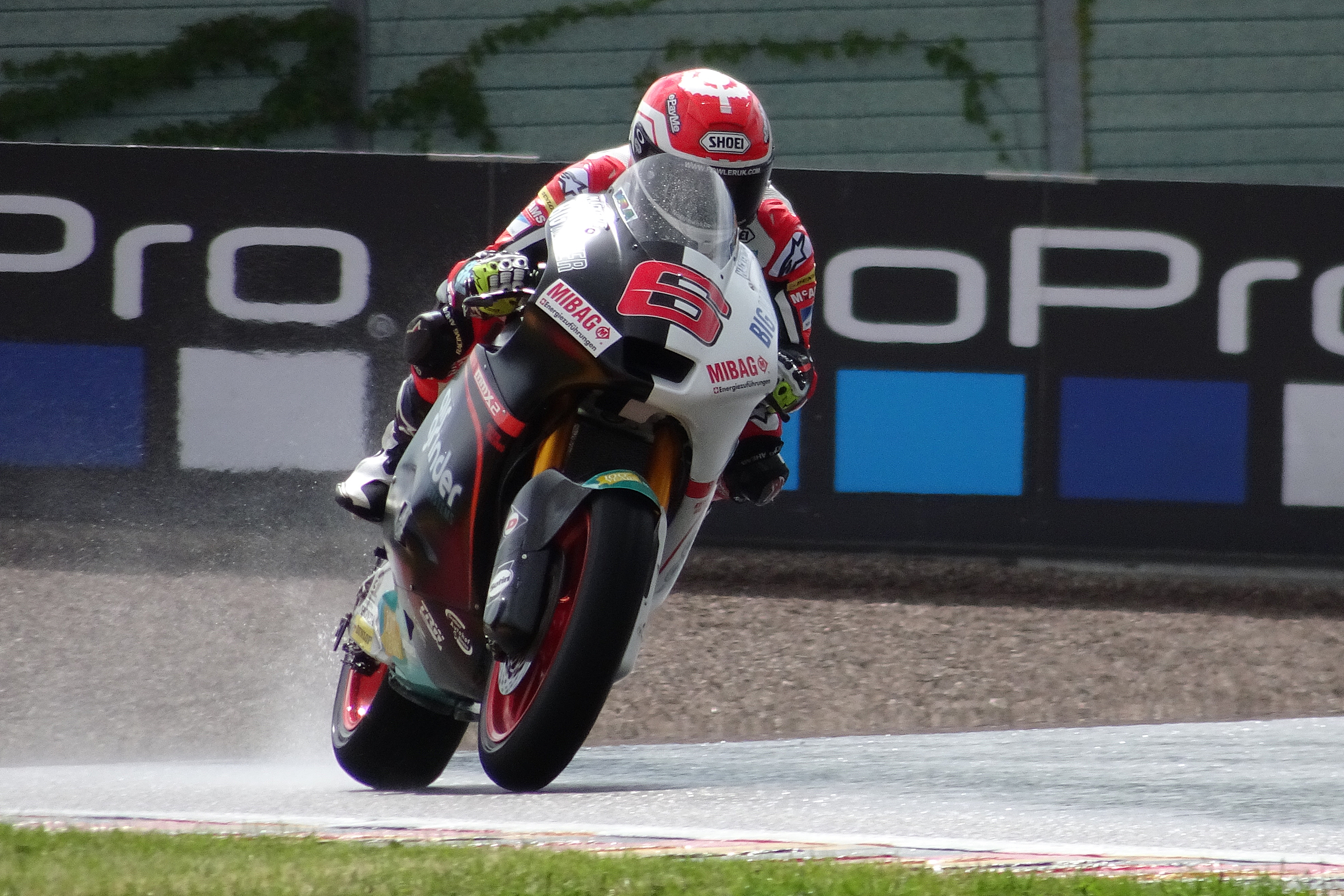
- Mackenzie at the Sachsenring in 2017 during the German motorcycle Grand Prix
- Born: 29 October 1995 (age 31); Stirling, Scotland
- Current team: Milwaukee MD BMW Motorrad
- Bike number: 95
Motorcycle racing career statistics
Moto2 World Championship
Active years	2017
Manufacturers	Suter
2017 championship position	37th (1 pt)
Starts / Wins / Podiums / Poles / F. laps / Points; 13 / 0 / 0 / 0 / 0 / 1
Superbike World Championship
Active years	2022, 2024–2026
Manufacturers	Yamaha (2022); Honda (2024–2025); Ducati (2025–2026)
2026 championship position	15th (81 pts)
Starts / Wins / Podiums / Poles / F. laps / Points; 83 / 0 / 0 / 0 / 0 / 155
Supersport World Championship
Active years	2023
Manufacturers	Honda
2023 championship position	18th (42 pts)
Starts / Wins / Podiums / Poles / F. laps / Points; 24 / 1 / 1 / 0 / 0 / 42
British Superbike Championship
Active years	2018–2022, 2027–present
Manufacturers	Yamaha
Championships	1 (2021)
2022 championship position	7th (1031 pts)
Starts / Wins / Podiums / Poles / F. laps / Points; 113 / 16 / 43 / 2 / 16 / 3177

Tarran Mackenzie (born 29 October 1995, often known as Taz) is a British professional motorcycle racer, born in Stirling, Scotland, and based in Ashby-de-la-Zouch, Leicestershire, England. He is set to compete in the British Superbike Championship for the BMW Motorrad team. Mackenzie is the 2021 British Superbike champion, and raced in the Superbike World Championship between 2022 and 2026.

In 2023, Mackenzie contested the World Supersport Championship for Japan-based MIE Honda team ran by Midori Moriwaki, and won his first World Championship race in Most, Czechia after continuing to ride on a wet track with dry tyres, as competitors lost time pitting for wheel-changes.

== Career ==
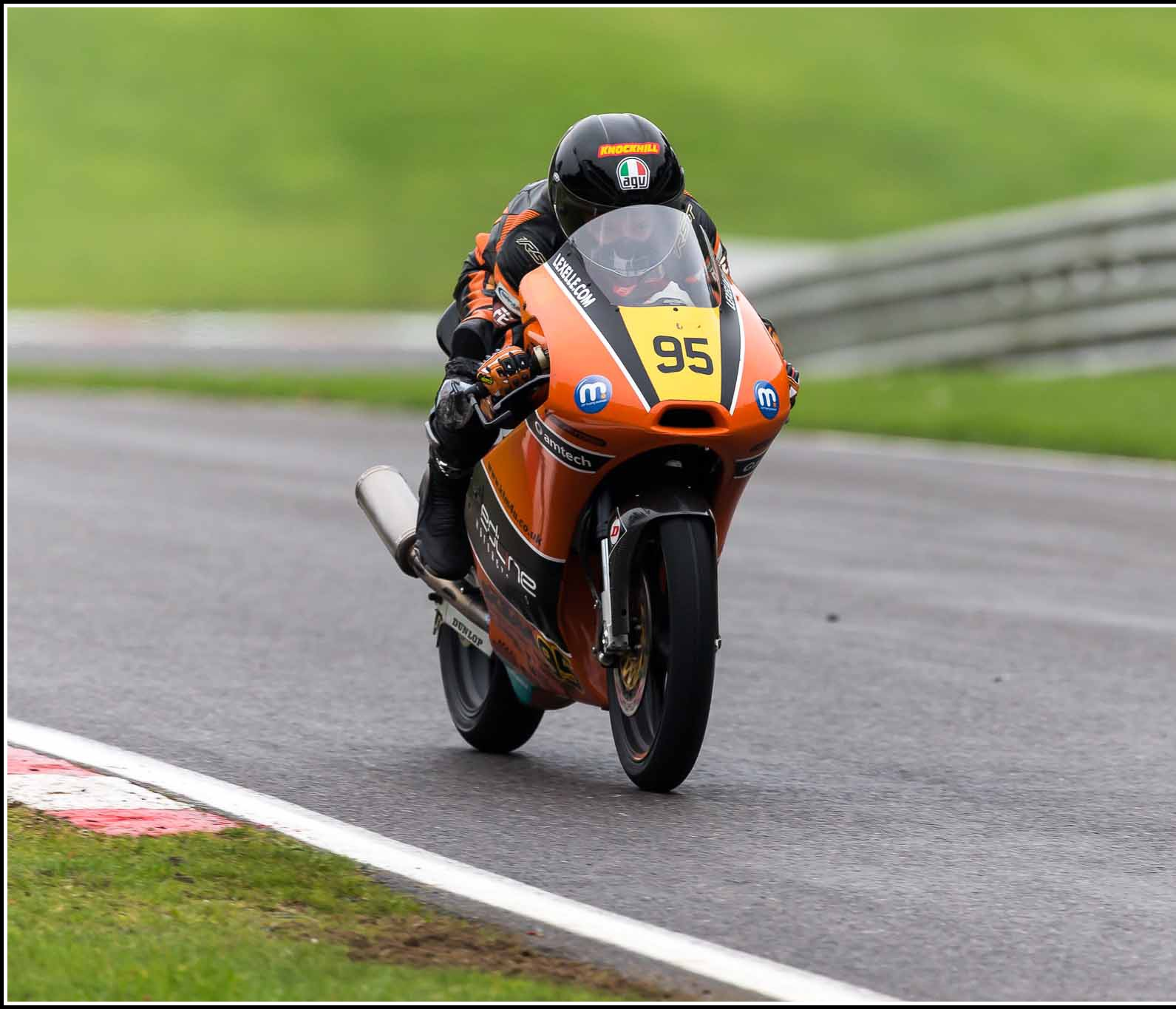
Mackenzie at Oulton Park in October 2013 during practice for Motostar class

Mackenzie won the 2021 British Superbike Championship at the final round in October 2021. With an ambition to eventually compete at world superbike level, no full-season opportunities were available for 2022.

Mackenzie's British Superbike 2022 racing season started at the third event at Donington Park in mid-May, after missing the Silverstone and Oulton Park rounds with injury. Riding only partially recovered at Donington, he rode conservatively for points, finishing the races in tenth, sixth and eleventh, further hindered by arm pump for the first time in his career, due to excessive arm use when steering, to compensate for his inability to switch-direction using leg pressure on the footrests.

Mackenzie's 2022 BSB season ended on 25 September with a crash at Oulton Park, when he fell at the chicane and slid across the track under an oncoming motorcycle, breaking his left femur.

== Nationality ==
Together with his brother, Taylor Mackenzie, also a motorcycle road racer until retiring in late 2021, they are the sons of Niall Mackenzie, a former motorcycle road racer. All three were born in the Stirling area of Scotland. Writing in 2017, Steve Day's feature was headed "MotoGP™ commentator Steve Day looks at the Scotsman ahead of his Moto2™ debut", and, as of 2021, the local newspaper was still referring to "...Stirling's Tarran".

== Racing background ==
Mackenzie started racing in the Aprilia Superteen Rookies Cup. During 2011, he competed in the British 125 cc Championship. For 2012, he was chosen for the Red Bull MotoGP Rookies Cup race series, held across various European countries.

Mackenzie competed in the Monster Energy Motostar Championship during 2013, and was the 2016 British Supersport 600 Champion. He entered the Moto2 world championship in 2017 as a replacement for Danny Kent, scoring one championship point from a best finish of 15th, achieving 37th overall.

=== British Superbikes ===
Mackenzie has been active in BSB since the 2018 British Superbike Championship season, winning the series in 2021.

=== World Superbikes ===
==== 2022 ====
During 2022, Mackenzie continued in British Superbikes, but received an offer of a factory world superbike Yamaha machine for potentially three wildcard events, at Assen, Donington Park, and a third unconfirmed circuit, during 2022. He sustained a leg injury in BSB early-season practice and could not participate in the scheduled wildcard entry at Assen.

After missing Assen, Netherlands in April, at the Donington Park event with three wildcard races in July 2022, Mackenzie placed 14th, and then 15th in the last race after crashing into Xavi Vierge in the sprint race in between, resulting in a DNF. Mackenzie received a five-place grid penalty for the third race-start.

==== 2024 ====
For 2024, Mackenzie would continue with the same team as in 2023, stepping-up from Supersport to World Superbikes with teammate Adam Norrodin.

== Career statistics ==
=== British 125 Championship ===
Year	Bike	1	2	3	4	5	6	7	8	9	10	11	12	13	Pos	Pts
2010	Honda	BRH; Ret	THR; Ret	OUL; 26	CAD; 26	MAL; 27	KNO; C	SNE; 23	BRH; 23	CAD; 23	CRO; 17	CRO; Ret	SIL; 23	OUL; 26	NC	0
2011	Honda	BRH; 5	OUL; Ret	CRO; 6	THR; 13	KNO; 4	SNE; Ret	OUL; Ret	BRH; Ret	CAD	DON; 13	SIL; 12	BRH; Ret		13th	44

=== Red Bull MotoGP Rookies Cup ===
==== Races by year ====
(key) (Races in bold indicate pole position, races in italics indicate fastest lap)

Year	1	2	3	4	5	6	7	8	9	10	11	12	13	14	15	Pos	Pts
2012	SPA1	SPA2	POR1	POR2	GBR1; 19	GBR2; 20	NED1; 20	NED2; 16	GER1; Ret	GER2; 15	CZE1; 21	CZE2; 15	RSM; 15	ARA1; 10	ARA2; 14	23rd	11
2013	AME1; Ret	AME2; 11	JER1; Ret	JER2; Ret	ASS1; 14	ASS2; 19	SAC1; 15	SAC2; 15	BRN; 15	SIL1; 9	SIL2; 17	MIS; 19	ARA1; 16	ARA2; 9		20th	24

=== Grand Prix motorcycle racing ===
==== By season ====
Season	Class	Motorcycle	Team	Race	Win	Podium	Pole	FLap	Pts	Plcd
2017	Moto2	Suter	Kiefer Racing	13	0	0	0	0	1	37th
Total				**1**	**0**	**0**	**0**	**0**	**1**	

==== Races by year ====
(key)

Year	Class	Bike	1	2	3	4	5	6	7	8	9	10	11	12	13	14	15	16	17	18	Pos.	Pts
2017	Moto2	Suter	QAT	ARG	AME	SPA	FRA; Ret	ITA; 27	CAT; Ret	NED; 25	GER; 23	CZE; 26	AUT; 20	GBR; 30	RSM; Ret	ARA; 27	JPN; 15	AUS; 22	MAL; WD	VAL; 24	37th	1

=== British Superbike Championship ===
==== Races by year ====
Year	Make	1			2			3			4			5			6			7			8			9			10			11			12			Pos	Pts
Year	Make	R1	R2	R3	R1	R2	R3	R1	R2	R3	R1	R2	R3	R1	R2	R3	R1	R2	R3	R1	R2	R3	R1	R2	R3	R1	R2	R3	R1	R2	R3	R1	R2	R3	R1	R2	R3	Pos	Pts
2018	Yamaha	DON; 18	DON; DNS		BHI; 11	BHI; 9		OUL; 9	OUL; Ret		SNE; 6	SNE; Ret		KNO; 14	KNO; 11		BHGP; Ret	BHGP; 5		THR; 9	THR; 5		CAD; 8	CAD; Ret		SIL; 3	SIL; Ret	SIL; 2	OUL; 7	OUL; 4		ASS; 3	ASS; Ret		BHGP; 3	BHGP; DNS	BHGP; DNS	10th	163
2019	Yamaha	SIL; 2	SIL; 1		OUL; 8	OUL; 5		DON; 2	DON; 5	DON; 4	BHGP; DNS	BHGP; DNS		KNO; Ret	KNO; 2		SNE; 3	SNE; Ret		THR; DNS	THR; DNS		CAD; 13	CAD; 12		OUL; 8	OUL; 9	OUL; 7	ASS; 7	ASS; 13		DON; 12	DON; 9		BHGP; 11	BHGP; 4	BHGP; 6	5th	566
2020	Yamaha	DON; 7	DON; 7	DON; 6	SNE; 7	SNE; 7	SNE; 6	SIL; 1	SIL; Ret	SIL; 2	OUL; 9	OUL; 6	OUL; 9	DON; 4	DON; 3	DON; 1	BHGP; 3	BHGP; Ret	BHGP; 2																			5th	215
2021	Yamaha	OUL; 5	OUL; 6	OUL; 4	KNO; 6	KNO; 3	KNO; 3	BHGP; 1	BHGP; 3	BHGP; 2	THR; 9	THR; 2	THR; 7	DON; 3	DON; 1	DON; 7	CAD; Ret	CAD; DNS	CAD; DNS	SNE; 1	SNE; 2	SNE; 1	SIL; Ret	SIL; 1	SIL; 2	OUL; 1	OUL; 3	OUL; 5	DON; 7	DON; 1	DON; Ret	BHGP; 1	BHGP; 1	BHGP; 1				1st	1202
2022	Yamaha	SIL	SIL	SIL	OUL	OUL	OUL	DON; 10	DON; 6	DON; 11	KNO; DNS	KNO; 10	KNO; 8	BRH; 2	BRH; 1	BRH; 1	THR; 2	THR; 2	THR; 1	CAD; 11	CAD; 11	CAD; 10	SNE; 2	SNE; 2	SNE; 3	OUL; Ret	OUL; DNS	OUL; DNS	DON	DON	DON	BRH	BRH	BRH				7th	1031

=== Superbike World Championship ===
==== By season ====
Season	Motorcycle	Team	Number	Race	Win	Podium	Pole	FLap	Pts	Plcd
2022	Yamaha YZF-R1	McAMS Yamaha	95	3	0	0	0	0	3	28th
2024	Honda CBR1000RR-R	Petronas MIE Racing Honda Team	95	28	0	0	0	0	7	23rd
2025	Honda CBR1000RR-R	Petronas MIE Racing Honda Team	95	16	0	0	0	0	45	19th
2025	Ducati Panigale V4R	MGM Bonovo Racing	95	15	0	0	0	0	45	19th
2026	Ducati Panigale V4R	MGM Optical Express Racing	95	6	0	0	0	0	19*	13th*
Total				**68**	**0**	**0**	**0**	**0**	**74**	

==== Races by year ====
(key) (Races in bold indicate pole position) (Races in italics indicate fastest lap)

Year	Bike	1			2			3			4			5			6			7			8			9			10			11			12			Pos	Pts
Year	Bike	R1	SR	R2	R1	SR	R2	R1	SR	R2	R1	SR	R2	R1	SR	R2	R1	SR	R2	R1	SR	R2	R1	SR	R2	R1	SR	R2	R1	SR	R2	R1	SR	R2	R1	SR	R2	Pos	Pts
2022	Yamaha	SPA	SPA	SPA	NED	NED	NED	POR	POR	POR	ITA	ITA	ITA	GBR; 14	GBR; Ret	GBR; 15	CZE	CZE	CZE	FRA	FRA	FRA	SPA	SPA	SPA	POR	POR	POR	ARG	ARG	ARG	INA	INA	INA	AUS	AUS	AUS	28th	3
2024	Honda	AUS; 19	AUS; Ret	AUS; 18	SPA; 16	SPA; 20	SPA; 17	NED; 14	NED; 17	NED; 11	ITA; Ret	ITA; 18	ITA; 19	GBR; Ret	GBR; DNS	GBR; DNS	CZE	CZE	CZE	POR	POR	POR	FRA; Ret	FRA; 18	FRA; 18	ITA; Ret	ITA; 23	ITA; Ret	SPA; 18	SPA; 19	SPA; 18	POR; 18	POR; 19	POR; Ret	SPA; 24	SPA; 21	SPA; Ret	23rd	7
2025	Honda	AUS; 16	AUS; 18	AUS; Ret	POR; 14	POR; Ret	POR; 17	NED; 12	NED; 9	NED; 14	ITA; Ret	ITA; Ret	ITA; Ret	CZE; DNS	CZE; 21	CZE; Ret	EMI; 16	EMI; Ret	EMI; DNS	GBR	GBR	GBR																19th	45
2025	Ducati																						HUN; 14	HUN; 8	HUN; 11	FRA; Ret	FRA; 13	FRA; 14	ARA; Ret	ARA; 13	ARA; 11	POR; 14	POR; 13	POR; Ret	SPA; 9	SPA; 7	SPA; 8	19th	45
2026	Ducati	AUS; 12	AUS; 11	AUS; 4	POR; 14	POR; 13	POR; Ret	NED	NED	NED	HUN	HUN	HUN	CZE	CZE	CZE	ARA	ARA	ARA	EMI	EMI	EMI	GBR	GBR	GBR	FRA	FRA	FRA	ITA	ITA	ITA	POR	POR	POR	SPA	SPA	SPA	13th*	19*

* Season still in progress.

=== Supersport World Championship ===
==== By season ====
Season	Class	Motorcycle	Team	Number	Race	Win	Podium	Pole	FLap	Pts	Plcd
2023	WSSP	Honda CBR600RR	Petronas MIE – MS Racing Honda Team	95	24	1	1	0	0	42	18th
Total					**24**	**1**	**1**	**0**	**0**	**42**	

==== Races by year ====
(key) (Races in bold indicate pole position, races in italics indicate fastest lap)

Year	Bike	1	2	3	4	5	6	7	8	9	10	11	12	13	14	15	16	17	18	19	20	21	22	23	24	Pos	Pts
2023	Honda	AUS; 5	AUS; 16	INA; 14	INA; 14	NED; 20	NED; 20	SPA; 27	SPA; 23	EMI; Ret	EMI; Ret	GBR; Ret	GBR; 23	ITA; 21	ITA; Ret	CZE; 17	CZE; 1	FRA; 24	FRA; 20	SPA; 26	SPA; 22	POR; 22	POR; 20	ARG; 19	ARG; 14	18th	42
