= Ryo Mizuno (motorcyclist) =

Japanese motorcycle racer

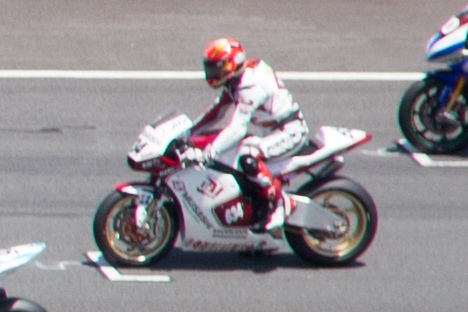
- Mizuno in 2016
- Nationality: Japanese
- Born: 31 May 1998 (age 28); Kiryū, Gunma, Japan
- Current team: Team Kagayama
- Bike number: 88
Motorcycle racing career statistics
Moto2 World Championship
Active years	2017
Manufacturers	Kalex
2017 championship position	42nd (0 pts)
Starts / Wins / Podiums / Poles / F. laps / Points; 1 / 0 / 0 / 0 / 0 / 0
Moto3 World Championship
Active years	2015
Manufacturers	Honda
2015 championship position	NC (0 pts)
Starts / Wins / Podiums / Poles / F. laps / Points; 1 / 0 / 0 / 0 / 0 / 0
Superbike World Championship
Active years	2023
Manufacturers	Honda
Championships	0
2023 championship position	NC (0 pts)
Starts / Wins / Podiums / Poles / F. laps / Points; 3 / 0 / 0 / 0 / 0 / 0
British Superbike Championship
Active years	2022
Manufacturers	Honda
Championships	0
2022 championship position	23rd (18 pts)
Starts / Wins / Podiums / Poles / F. laps / Points; 33 / 0 / 0 / 0 / 0 / 18

Ryo Mizuno (Japanese: 水野 涼, Hepburn: Mizuno Ryō; born 31 May 1998 in Kiryū, Gunma) is a Japanese motorcycle racer who competes in the JSB1000 class of the All Japan Road Race Championship for Team Kagayama, aboard a Ducati Panigale V4 R.

Mizuno previously competed in the British Superbike Championship on a factory-supported Honda Fireblade. He was the All Japan J-GP3 champion in 2015, J-GP2 champion in 2017, and most recently crowned JSB1000 champion in 2026.

== Career statistics ==
=== Asia Talent Cup ===
==== Races by year ====
(key) (Races in bold indicate pole position; races in italics indicate fastest lap)

Year	Bike	1	2	3		4		5	6		Pos	Pts
Year	Bike	R1	R1	R1	R2	R1	R2	R1	R1	R2	Pos	Pts
2014	Honda	QAT; 8	IDN; 2	CHN1; 4	CHN2; 5	MAL1; 6	MAL2; 4	JAP; 16	MYS1; 18	MYS2; 10	6th	81

=== Grand Prix motorcycle racing ===
==== By season ====
Season	Class	Motorcycle	Team	Race	Win	Podium	Pole	FLap	Pts	Plcd
2015	Moto3	Honda	Musashi RT Harc-Pro	1	0	0	0	0	0	NC
2017	Moto2	Kalex	MuSASHi RT HARC-PRO	1	0	0	0	0	0	42nd
Total				**2**	**0**	**0**	**0**	**0**	**0**	

==== Races by year ====
Year	Class	Bike	1	2	3	4	5	6	7	8	9	10	11	12	13	14	15	16	17	18	Pos.	Pts
2015	Moto3	Honda	QAT	AME	ARG	SPA	FRA	ITA	CAT	NED	GER	IND	CZE	GBR	RSM	ARA	JPN; Ret	AUS	MAL	VAL	NC	0
2017	Moto2	Kalex	QAT	ARG	AME	SPA	FRA	ITA	CAT	NED	GER	CZE	AUT	GBR	RSM	ARA	JPN; 22	AUS	MAL	VAL	42nd	0

=== Superbike World Championship ===
==== Races by year ====
(key) (Races in bold indicate pole position) (Races in italics indicate fastest lap)

Year	Bike	1			2			3			4			5			6			7			8			9			10			11			Pos	Pts
Year	Bike	R1	SR	R2	R1	SR	R2	R1	SR	R2	R1	SR	R2	R1	SR	R2	R1	SR	R2	R1	SR	R2	R1	SR	R2	R1	SR	R2	R1	SR	R2	R1	SR	R2	Pos	Pts
2023	Honda	AUS	AUS	AUS	INA	INA	INA	NED	NED	NED	SPA	SPA	SPA	ITA; 21	ITA; 19	ITA; Ret	GBR	GBR	GBR	CZE	CZE	CZE	FRA	FRA	FRA	SPA	SPA	SPA	POR	POR	POR	ARG	ARG	ARG	NC	0

^{*} Season still in progress.

=== British Superbike Championship ===
==== By year ====
Year	Bike	1			2			3			4			5			6			7			8			9			10			11			Pos	Pts
Year	Bike	R1	R2	R3	R1	R2	R3	R1	R2	R3	R1	R2	R3	R1	R2	R3	R1	R2	R3	R1	R2	R3	R1	R2	R3	R1	R2	R3	R1	R2	R3	R1	R2	R3	Pos	Pts
2021	Honda	OUL; 19	OUL; Ret	OUL; DNS	KNO; 20	KNO; 18	KNO; 19	BHGP; DNS	BHGP; DNS	BHGP; DNS	THR; 21	THR; 19	THR; 22	DON; 19	DON; 15	DON; 13	CAD; 19	CAD; Ret	CAD; DNS	SNE; 16	SNE; Ret	SNE; DNS	SIL; 12	SIL; 16	SIL; 15	OUL; 18	OUL; Ret	OUL; 16	DON; Ret	DON; 14	DON; 21	BHGP; Ret	BHGP; 20	BHGP; 20	22nd	11
2022	Honda	SIL; Ret	SIL; 17	SIL; 20	OUL; 22	OUL; 22	OUL; 21	DON; 15	DON; 15	DON; 13	KNO; 18	KNO; 15	KNO; Ret	BRH; 22	BRH; Ret	BRH; 21	THR; 15	THR; 14	THR; 12	CAD; 20	CAD; 22	CAD; 21	SNE; 16	SNE; 15	SNE; 14	OUL; 18	OUL; 15	OUL; 20	DON; 15	DON; 16	DON; 20	BRH; Ret	BRH; 18	BRH; 19	23rd	18

=== Suzuka 8 Hours ===
Year	Class	Team	Co-riders	Bike	Pos
2024	**EWC**	(Japan) Ducati Team Kagayama	(Malaysia) Hafizh Syahrin (Australia) Josh Waters	Ducati Panigale V4R	4th
2025	**EWC**	(Japan) SDG-Ducati Team Kagayama	(United Kingdom) Leon Haslam (Germany) Marcel Schrötter	Ducati Panigale V4	29th
2026	**EXP**	(Japan) Team Suzuki CN Challenge	(Japan) Takuya Tsuda (France) Étienne Masson	Suzuki GSX-R1000R	7th

=== Asia Road Racing Championship ===
==== Races by year ====
(key) (Races in bold indicate pole position, races in italics indicate fastest lap)

Year	Class	Bike	1		2		3		4		5		6		Pos	Pts
Year	Class	Bike	R1	R2	R1	R2	R1	R2	R1	R2	R1	R2	R1	R2	Pos	Pts
2025	ASB1000	Ducati	CHA	CHA	SEP	SEP	MOT	MOT	MAN	MAN	SEP; DNS	SEP; DNS	CHA; Ret	CHA; 7	22nd	9

=== All Japan Road Race Championship ===
==== Races by year ====
(key) (Races in bold indicate pole position; races in italics indicate fastest lap)

Year	Class	Bike	1	2	3	4	5	6	7	8	9	10	11	Pos	Pts
2024	JSB1000	Ducati	SUZ; 2	MOT1; 2	**MOT2**; 3	SUG1; 3	SUG2; 2	**MOT**; 1	AUT1; 3	AUT2; 20	OKA; 2	SUZ1; 1	SUZ2; 1	3rd	209
2025	JSB1000	Ducati	**MOT**; 1	SUG1	SUG2	MOT1; 4	MOT2; 3	AUT1; 11	AUT2; 4	**OKA**; 4	SUZ1; 1	SUZ2; 1		2nd	141
2026	JSB1000	Ducati	**MOT**; 1	**SUG1**; 1	**SUG2**; 1	AUT1; 1	AUT2; 1	**MOT1**; 1	**MOT2**; 1	OKA; 3	SUZ1; 1	SUZ2; 3		1st	238
