= 2021 British Superbike Championship =

British motorcycle racing season

The 2021 British Superbike Championship season was the 34th British Superbike Championship season. Josh Brookes started the season as the reigning champion. The playoff system was reinstituted. Tarran Mackenzie on a McAMS Yamaha R1 took the 2021 BSB Championship Title over Tommy Bridewell.

== Playoff Changes ==
The playoff will now consist of eight riders instead of six.

== Teams and riders ==
2021 Entry List
| Team | Constructor | No. | Rider | Rounds |
|---|---|---|---|---|
| VisionTrack Ducati | Ducati | 1 | (Australia) Josh Brookes | All |
| VisionTrack Ducati | Ducati | 21 | (England) Christian Iddon | All |
| Honda Racing | Honda | 2 | (Northern Ireland) Glenn Irwin | All |
| Honda Racing | Honda | 13 | (Japan) Takumi Takahashi | All |
| Honda Racing | Honda | 88 | (Japan) Ryo Mizuno | All |
| TAG Racing Honda | Honda | 4 | (England) Dan Linfoot | 1–9 |
| TAG Racing Honda | Honda | 12 | (England) Luke Mossey | 11 |
| Silicone Engineering Racing Kawasaki | Kawasaki | 5 | (England) Dean Harrison | 1, 3–11 |
| FHO Racing BMW | BMW | 6 | (Spain) Xavi Forés | 1, 3–8 |
| FHO Racing BMW | BMW | 40 | (England) Joe Francis | 10–11 |
| FHO Racing BMW | BMW | 60 | (England) Peter Hickman | All |
| RAF Regular and Reserves Kawasaki; VisionTrack Kawasaki | Kawasaki | 7 | (England) Ryan Vickers | All |
| Rapid CDH Racing | Kawasaki | 10 | (England) Joe Sheldon-Shaw | 5–6 |
| Rapid CDH Racing | Kawasaki | 65 | (England) Josh Owens | 1, 7, 9–11 |
| Roadhouse Macau by FHO Racing | BMW | 11 | (Republic of Ireland) Brian McCormack | All |
| FS-3 Racing Kawasaki | Kawasaki | 14 | (England) Lee Jackson | All |
| FS-3 Racing Kawasaki | Kawasaki | 69 | (Scotland) Rory Skinner | All |
| Black Onyx Security Honda | Honda | 16 | (England) Luke Hopkins | 1–8, 10–11 |
| SYNETIQ BMW Motorrad | BMW | 18 | (Northern Ireland) Andrew Irwin | All |
| SYNETIQ BMW Motorrad | BMW | 83 | (England) Danny Buchan | 1–5, 7–11 |
| PR Racing BMW | BMW | 20 | (England) Brad Jones | 1–3 |
| PR Racing BMW | BMW | 10 | (England) Joe Sheldon-Shaw | 9–11 |
| PR Racing BMW | BMW | 33 | (Northern Ireland) Keith Farmer | 8 |
| PR Racing BMW | BMW | 40 | (England) Joe Francis | 1–7 |
| McAMS Yamaha | Yamaha | 22 | (Australia) Jason O'Halloran | All |
| McAMS Yamaha | Yamaha | 95 | (Scotland) Tarran Mackenzie | All |
| Powerslide/Catfoss Racing | Suzuki | 27 | (South Africa) Bjorn Estment | All |
| Rich Energy OMG Racing | BMW | 28 | (England) Bradley Ray | All |
| Rich Energy OMG Racing | BMW | 77 | (England) Kyle Ryde | 1–5, 7–11 |
| Rich Energy OMG Racing | BMW | 77 | (England) James Hillier | 6 |
| NP Motorcycles | BMW | 31 | (England) Sam Cox | 8 |
| NP Motorcycles | BMW | 71 | (England) Jesse Trayler | 10–11 |
| NP Motorcycles | BMW | 74 | (England) Joey Thompson | 1–3, 5–6 |
| Buildbase Suzuki | Suzuki | 6 | (Northern Ireland) Michael Dunlop | 9 |
| Buildbase Suzuki | Suzuki | 44 | (England) Gino Rea | All |
| Buildbase Suzuki | Suzuki | 52 | (England) Danny Kent | 1–5 |
| Buildbase Suzuki | Suzuki | 54 | (England) Tim Neave | 6 |
| Buildbase Suzuki | Suzuki | 55 | (England) Leon Jeacock | 11 |
| Buildbase Suzuki | Suzuki | 81 | (England) Luke Stapleford | 7–8 |
| Buildbase Suzuki | Suzuki | 94 | (Japan) Naomichi Uramoto | 10 |
| Oxford Products Racing | Ducati | 46 | (England) Tommy Bridewell | All |
| GR Motorsport | Kawasaki | 79 | (England) Storm Stacey | All |

Key
Regular rider
Wildcard rider
Replacement rider

== Race calendar and results ==
2021 calendar
Main Season
| Round | | Circuit | Date | Pole position | Fastest lap | Winning rider | Winning team |
|---|---|---|---|---|---|---|---|
| 1 | R1 | (England) Oulton Park | 26 June | (England) Tommy Bridewell | (Australia) Jason O'Halloran | (Australia) Jason O'Halloran | McAMS Yamaha |
| 1 | R2 | (England) Oulton Park | 27 June | | (England) Peter Hickman | (Australia) Jason O'Halloran | McAMS Yamaha |
| 1 | R3 | (England) Oulton Park | 27 June | | (Scotland) Tarran Mackenzie | (Australia) Jason O'Halloran | McAMS Yamaha |
| 2 | R1 | (Scotland) Knockhill | 10 July | (Australia) Jason O'Halloran | (England) Danny Buchan | (England) Christian Iddon | VisionTrack Ducati |
| 2 | R2 | (Scotland) Knockhill | 11 July | | (Scotland) Rory Skinner | (England) Danny Buchan | SYNETIQ BMW Motorrad |
| 2 | R3 | (Scotland) Knockhill | 11 July | | (England) Bradley Ray | (England) Danny Buchan | SYNETIQ BMW Motorrad |
| 3 | R1 | (England) Brands Hatch GP | 24 July | (Scotland) Tarran Mackenzie | (England) Danny Buchan | (Scotland) Tarran Mackenzie | McAMS Yamaha |
| 3 | R2 | (England) Brands Hatch GP | 25 July | | (Australia) Jason O'Halloran | (Australia) Jason O'Halloran | McAMS Yamaha |
| 3 | R3 | (England) Brands Hatch GP | 25 July | | (Australia) Jason O'Halloran | (England) Christian Iddon | VisionTrack Ducati |
| 4 | R1 | (England) Thruxton | 31 July | (Australia) Jason O'Halloran | (England) Lee Jackson | (Australia) Jason O'Halloran | McAMS Yamaha |
| 4 | R2 | (England) Thruxton | 1 August | | (Australia) Jason O'Halloran | (Australia) Jason O'Halloran | McAMS Yamaha |
| 4 | R3 | (England) Thruxton | 1 August | | (England) Danny Buchan | (Australia) Jason O'Halloran | McAMS Yamaha |
| 5 | R1 | (England) Donington Park National | 14 August | (Australia) Jason O'Halloran | (Australia) Jason O'Halloran | (Australia) Jason O'Halloran | McAMS Yamaha |
| 5 | R2 | (England) Donington Park National | 15 August | | (England) Peter Hickman | (Scotland) Tarran Mackenzie | McAMS Yamaha |
| 5 | R3 | (England) Donington Park National | 15 August | | (England) Christian Iddon | (England) Tommy Bridewell | Oxford Products Racing |
| 6 | R1 | (England) Cadwell Park | 21 August | (Northern Ireland) Glenn Irwin | (England) Peter Hickman | (England) Peter Hickman | FHO Racing BMW |
| 6 | R2 | (England) Cadwell Park | 22 August | | (England) Tommy Bridewell | (England) Peter Hickman | FHO Racing BMW |
| 6 | R3 | (England) Cadwell Park | 22 August | | (England) Lee Jackson | (Australia) Jason O'Halloran | McAMS Yamaha |
| 7 | R1 | (England) Snetterton 300 | 4 September | (Northern Ireland) Glenn Irwin | (England) Tommy Bridewell | (Scotland) Tarran Mackenzie | McAMS Yamaha |
| 7 | R2 | (England) Snetterton 300 | 5 September | | (Scotland) Tarran Mackenzie | (Australia) Jason O'Halloran | McAMS Yamaha |
| 7 | R3 | (England) Snetterton 300 | 5 September | | (Australia) Josh Brookes | (Scotland) Tarran Mackenzie | McAMS Yamaha |
| 8 | R1 | (England) Silverstone National | 11 September | (Australia) Jason O'Halloran | (England) Gino Rea | (Northern Ireland) Glenn Irwin | Honda Racing |
| 8 | R2 | (England) Silverstone National | 12 September | | (Scotland) Tarran Mackenzie | (Scotland) Tarran Mackenzie | McAMS Yamaha |
| 8 | R3 | (England) Silverstone National | 12 September | | (Scotland) Tarran Mackenzie | (Australia) Jason O'Halloran | McAMS Yamaha |
The Showdown
| 9 | R1 | (England) Oulton Park | 25 September | (Australia) Josh Brookes | (Australia) Jason O'Halloran | (Scotland) Tarran Mackenzie | McAMS Yamaha |
| 9 | R2 | (England) Oulton Park | 26 September | | (England) Tommy Bridewell | (England) Tommy Bridewell | Oxford Products Racing |
| 9 | R3 | (England) Oulton Park | 26 September | | (England) Tommy Bridewell | (England) Tommy Bridewell | Oxford Products Racing |
| 10 | R1 | (England) Donington Park GP | 2 October | (England) Gino Rea | (England) Gino Rea | (England) Gino Rea | Buildbase Suzuki |
| 10 | R2 | (England) Donington Park GP | 3 October | | (Scotland) Tarran Mackenzie | (Scotland) Tarran Mackenzie | McAMS Yamaha |
| 10 | R3 | (England) Donington Park GP | 3 October | | (England) Gino Rea | (England) Gino Rea | Buildbase Suzuki |
| 11 | R1 | (England) Brands Hatch GP | 16 October | (England) Luke Mossey | (England) Tommy Bridewell | (Scotland) Tarran Mackenzie | McAMS Yamaha |
| 11 | R2 | (England) Brands Hatch GP | 17 October | | (England) Tommy Bridewell | (Scotland) Tarran Mackenzie | McAMS Yamaha |
| 11 | R3 | (England) Brands Hatch GP | 17 October | | (Scotland) Tarran Mackenzie | (Scotland) Tarran Mackenzie | McAMS Yamaha |

== Championship standings ==
=== Riders' championship ===
Scoring system

Points are awarded to the top fifteen finishers. A rider has to finish the race to earn points.

| Position | **1st** | **2nd** | **3rd** | **4th** | **5th** | **6th** | **7th** | **8th** | **9th** | **10th** | **11th** | **12th** | **13th** | **14th** | **15th** |
| Points | 25 | 20 | 16 | 13 | 11 | 10 | 9 | 8 | 7 | 6 | 5 | 4 | 3 | 2 | 1 |

| Pos | Rider | Bike | OUL (England) | | | KNO (Scotland) | | | BRH (England) | | | THR (England) | | | DON (England) | | | CAD (England) | | | SNE (England) | | | SIL (England) | | | OUL (England) | | | DON (England) | | | BRH (England) | | | Pts |
| Pos | Rider | Bike | R1 | R2 | R3 | R1 | R2 | R3 | R1 | R2 | R3 | R1 | R2 | R3 | R1 | R2 | R3 | R1 | R2 | R3 | R1 | R2 | R3 | R1 | R2 | R3 | R1 | R2 | R3 | R1 | R2 | R3 | R1 | R2 | R3 | Pts |
The Championship Showdown
| 1 | (Scotland) Tarran Mackenzie | Yamaha | 5 | 6 | 4 | 6 | 3 | 3 | **1** | 3 | 2 | 9 | 2 | 7 | 3 | 1 | 7 | Ret | DNS | DNS | 1 | 2 | **1** | Ret | 1 | **2** | 1 | 3 | 5 | 7 | 1 | **Ret** | 1 | 1 | 1 | 1202 |
| 2 | (England) Tommy Bridewell | Ducati | **3** | Ret | 3 | 8 | 5 | 7 | 2 | 2 | Ret | 10 | 12 | 18 | 5 | 5 | 1 | 3 | 3 | **3** | 2 | **3** | 2 | 3 | 5 | 5 | 6 | 1 | **1** | Ret | 7 | 4 | 2 | **2** | **2** | 1166 |
| 3 | (Australia) Jason O’Halloran | Yamaha | 1 | **1** | 1 | **2** | Ret | 6 | 5 | 1 | **3** | **1** | 1 | **1** | **1** | **3** | 12 | 2 | 2 | 1 | 3 | 1 | 3 | **Ret** | 2 | 1 | Ret | **2** | Ret | 5 | 9 | 8 | 4 | 3 | 3 | 1162 |
| 4 | (England) Christian Iddon | Ducati | 2 | 2 | 2 | 1 | 4 | 4 | 3 | 5 | 1 | 2 | Ret | 9 | 4 | Ret | Ret | 5 | Ret | 7 | Ret | 11 | 5 | 2 | 7 | 6 | 3 | 4 | 11 | 3 | 3 | 2 | 3 | 4 | Ret | 1141 |
| 5 | (England) Peter Hickman | BMW | 4 | 3 | **5** | Ret | 7 | 8 | Ret | 9 | 7 | 3 | 5 | 8 | 9 | 4 | **14** | 1 | **1** | 2 | 7 | 10 | 7 | Ret | 10 | 12 | 5 | 5 | 4 | Ret | Ret | 7 | 5 | 5 | 5 | 1092 |
| 6 | (Australia) Josh Brookes | Ducati | 10 | 7 | 6 | 10 | 12 | 13 | 9 | 18 | 5 | 17 | 16 | 14 | 18 | 10 | 4 | 10 | 5 | 5 | 4 | 4 | 6 | 4 | 3 | 3 | **2** | Ret | 2 | Ret | 11 | Ret | 7 | 6 | 4 | 1079 |
| 7 | (England) Danny Buchan | BMW | 12 | 4 | 8 | 3 | **1** | 1 | 4 | **4** | 4 | 13 | 7 | 2 | 13 | Ret | DNS | | | | 10 | 13 | DNS | Ret | 12 | 4 | 7 | 8 | 6 | Ret | 2 | Ret | 11 | 7 | Ret | 1075 |
| 8 | (Northern Ireland) Glenn Irwin | Honda | 6 | 9 | 10 | 12 | 11 | Ret | 11 | 8 | 6 | Ret | 3 | 6 | 2 | Ret | 2 | **4** | 6 | 6 | **Ret** | 14 | 11 | 1 | 13 | 9 | 8 | Ret | 7 | Ret | 10 | 10 | 9 | 9 | Ret | 1055 |
BSB Riders Cup
| 9 | (England) Lee Jackson | Kawasaki | 8 | 8 | 7 | 9 | 8 | 10 | 6 | 7 | 8 | 5 | **Ret** | 12 | 8 | Ret | 15 | 6 | 4 | 4 | 5 | 6 | DNS | Ret | 11 | 8 | 4 | 6 | Ret | 4 | 5 | 3 | 8 | Ret | 6 | 248 |
| 10 | (England) Bradley Ray | BMW | Ret | 5 | Ret | 4 | 9 | 5 | 7 | 12 | 13 | 7 | 4 | 10 | 10 | 2 | 16 | 13 | 8 | 8 | 9 | 12 | 9 | 5 | 4 | 7 | 9 | 7 | 3 | 9 | 12 | 14 | 10 | 12 | 8 | 245 |
| 11 | (England) Gino Rea | Suzuki | 11 | 13 | 11 | 13 | 10 | 11 | Ret | 10 | DNS | 8 | 10 | 11 | 15 | Ret | 10 | Ret | Ret | 11 | Ret | 5 | 4 | 6 | **6** | Ret | Ret | 10 | 9 | **1** | **4** | 1 | 12 | 8 | 10 | 202 |
| 12 | (England) Ryan Vickers | Kawasaki | 9 | 11 | 9 | 7 | 6 | 9 | 15 | 15 | 15 | 4 | Ret | 4 | 6 | 7 | Ret | 8 | 9 | 10 | 6 | 7 | 13 | Ret | 8 | 10 | Ret | 13 | 12 | 8 | 15 | 6 | 18 | 16 | 12 | 180 |
| 13 | (Scotland) Rory Skinner | Kawasaki | 13 | 12 | 13 | 5 | 2 | **2** | 8 | 6 | 9 | 14 | 11 | Ret | 17 | 14 | 11 | 9 | Ret | 12 | 8 | 9 | 15 | 7 | 9 | 16 | 11 | 11 | 10 | 10 | Ret | 12 | Ret | Ret | 7 | 178 |
| 14 | (Northern Ireland) Andrew Irwin | BMW | Ret | 15 | Ret | 15 | 14 | 15 | 12 | 14 | Ret | 11 | 8 | 5 | 7 | 9 | 3 | 7 | 7 | 9 | Ret | 8 | 12 | 11 | Ret | 11 | 17 | 9 | 8 | 12 | 8 | 5 | 6 | Ret | 9 | 169 |
| 15 | (England) Kyle Ryde | BMW | 7 | 10 | 12 | 11 | 15 | 17 | 16 | 13 | 16 | Ret | 6 | 16 | 11 | 6 | Ret | | | | 19 | 15 | 10 | 8 | 15 | 17 | 13 | Ret | 15 | 2 | 6 | 15 | 13 | 10 | 11 | 118 |
| 16 | (England) Dan Linfoot | Honda | 18 | 18 | 15 | 14 | 13 | 12 | 14 | 16 | 12 | 16 | 14 | 13 | 12 | 11 | 9 | 12 | 13 | 14 | 11 | Ret | 8 | 13 | 17 | 13 | 12 | DNS | DNS | | | | | | | 69 |
| 17 | (Spain) Xavi Forés | BMW | DNS | DNS | DNS | | | | 13 | 11 | 11 | 12 | 13 | Ret | 14 | 8 | Ret | 14 | 12 | 13 | 12 | 16 | DNS | 9 | 18 | 14 | | | | | | | | | | 52 |
| 18 | (England) Danny Kent | Suzuki | Ret | 14 | Ret | Ret | Ret | 14 | 10 | Ret | 10 | 6 | 9 | 3 | 16 | Ret | DNS | | | | | | | | | | | | | | | | | | | 49 |
| 19 | (England) Storm Stacey | Kawasaki | 16 | Ret | Ret | 17 | 16 | 16 | Ret | 17 | DNS | 15 | 18 | 15 | 23 | 12 | 6 | 11 | 10 | Ret | 13 | 18 | DNS | 15 | 19 | 18 | 10 | Ret | 14 | Ret | Ret | 11 | 16 | 14 | 13 | 49 |
| 20 | (England) Joe Francis | BMW | Ret | Ret | Ret | 16 | 17 | Ret | 18 | Ret | 17 | Ret | 21 | 19 | Ret | Ret | 5 | DNS | DNS | DNS | 15 | Ret | Ret | | | | | | | 6 | Ret | 9 | 14 | 11 | Ret | 36 |
| 21 | (England) Dean Harrison | Kawasaki | 14 | 17 | Ret | | | | 17 | 19 | 14 | 18 | 17 | 17 | 20 | 13 | 8 | Ret | 14 | 16 | 18 | 17 | 16 | 16 | 20 | 21 | 14 | 12 | 13 | Ret | Ret | 19 | Ret | Ret | 14 | 28 |
| 22 | (Japan) Ryo Mizuno | Honda | 19 | Ret | DNS | 20 | 18 | 19 | DNS | DNS | DNS | 21 | 19 | 22 | 19 | 15 | 13 | 19 | Ret | DNS | 16 | Ret | DNS | 12 | 16 | 15 | 18 | Ret | 16 | Ret | 14 | 21 | Ret | 20 | 20 | 11 |
| 23 | (England) Luke Stapleford | Suzuki | | | | | | | | | | | | | | | | | | | 17 | 19 | 14 | 10 | 14 | DNS | | | | | | | | | | 10 |
| 24 | (South Africa) Bjorn Estment | Suzuki | 15 | 19 | Ret | 21 | Ret | Ret | 19 | 20 | 18 | 19 | Ret | 20 | Ret | Ret | 17 | 17 | Ret | DNS | 20 | 20 | 18 | 14 | 21 | 19 | 15 | Ret | Ret | 11 | 16 | 17 | Ret | Ret | 15 | 10 |
| 25 | (England) Tim Neave | Suzuki | | | | | | | | | | | | | | | | 15 | 11 | 15 | | | | | | | | | | | | | | | | 7 |
| 26 | (Japan) Takumi Takahashi | Honda | Ret | Ret | 17 | 22 | Ret | 21 | Ret | Ret | 19 | 20 | 15 | 21 | 21 | Ret | Ret | 16 | 16 | Ret | 14 | 21 | 17 | Ret | 22 | DNS | 20 | 17 | 19 | 13 | 18 | 20 | 17 | 15 | 17 | 7 |
| 27 | (Japan) Naomichi Uramoto | Suzuki | | | | | | | | | | | | | | | | | | | | | | | | | | | | Ret | 13 | 13 | | | | 6 |
| 28 | (England) Luke Mossey | Honda | | | | | | | | | | | | | | | | | | | | | | | | | | | | | | | **15** | 13 | 16 | 4 |
| 29 | (England) Josh Owens | Kawasaki | Ret | 16 | Ret | | | | | | | | | | | | | | | | DNQ | DNQ | DNQ | | | | 16 | 15 | 18 | 14 | Ret | 16 | Ret | DNS | DNS | 3 |
| 30 | (England) Luke Hopkins | Honda | 17 | 20 | 14 | 19 | Ret | 20 | 20 | 21 | 21 | 22 | 20 | Ret | 22 | Ret | Ret | DNS | DNS | DNS | DNQ | DNQ | DNQ | 17 | 23 | 20 | | | | Ret | 19 | 22 | 21 | 19 | 21 | 2 |
| 31 | (Northern Ireland) Michael Dunlop | Suzuki | | | | | | | | | | | | | | | | | | | | | | | | | 19 | 14 | 17 | | | | | | | 2 |
| 32 | (Republic of Ireland) Brian McCormack | BMW | 20 | 21 | 18 | Ret | 20 | Ret | 21 | Ret | 20 | 23 | 22 | Ret | Ret | Ret | Ret | 20 | Ret | 19 | 21 | 22 | DNS | 18 | Ret | DNS | Ret | 18 | 20 | 15 | 20 | Ret | 22 | Ret | 22 | 1 |
| 33 | (England) Joe Sheldon-Shaw | Kawasaki | | | | | | | | | | | | | Ret | Ret | Ret | 18 | 15 | 17 | | | | | | | | | | | | | | | | 1 |
| 33 | (England) Joe Sheldon-Shaw | BMW | | | | | | | | | | | | | | | | | | | | | | | | | Ret | 16 | Ret | DNS | 17 | 18 | 19 | 17 | 18 | 1 |
| | (England) Brad Jones | BMW | Ret | Ret | 16 | 18 | 19 | 18 | Ret | DNS | DNS | | | | | | | | | | | | | | | | | | | | | | | | | 0 |
| | (England) James Hillier | BMW | | | | | | | | | | | | | | | | 21 | 17 | 18 | | | | | | | | | | | | | | | | 0 |
| | (England) Leon Jeacock | Suzuki | | | | | | | | | | | | | | | | | | | | | | | | | | | | | | | 20 | 18 | 19 | 0 |
| | (England) Jesse Trayler | BMW | | | | | | | | | | | | | | | | | | | | | | | | | | | | Ret | 21 | Ret | 23 | 21 | Ret | 0 |
| | (England) Joey Thompson | BMW | 21 | 22 | Ret | DNS | DNS | DNS | 22 | Ret | 22 | | | | Ret | DNS | DNS | DNS | DNS | DNS | | | | | | | | | | | | | | | | 0 |
| | (England) Sam Cox | BMW | | | | | | | | | | | | | | | | | | | | | | Ret | Ret | Ret | | | | | | | | | | 0 |
| | (Northern Ireland) Keith Farmer | BMW | | | | | | | | | | | | | | | | | | | | | | Ret | DNS | DNS | | | | | | | | | | 0 |
| Pos | Rider | Bike | OUL (England) | | | KNO (Scotland) | | | BRH (England) | | | THR (England) | | | DON (England) | | | CAD (England) | | | SNE (England) | | | SIL (England) | | | OUL (England) | | | DON (England) | | | BRH (England) | | | Pts |

| Colour | Result |
|---|---|
| Gold | Winner |
| Silver | Second place |
| Bronze | Third place |
| Green | Points classification |
| Blue | Non-points classification |
| Blue | Non-classified finish (NC) |
| Purple | Retired, not classified (Ret) |
| Red | Did not qualify (DNQ) |
| Red | Did not pre-qualify (DNPQ) |
| Black | Disqualified (DSQ) |
| White | Did not start (DNS) |
| White | Withdrew (WD) |
| White | Race cancelled (C) |
| Blank | Did not practice (DNP) |
| Blank | Did not arrive (DNA) |
| Blank | Excluded (EX) |

**Bold** – Pole position
Italics – Fastest lap
