= 2017 Japanese motorcycle Grand Prix =

(Japan) 2017 Japanese Grand Prix
Race details
- Race 15 of 18 races in the 2017 Grand Prix motorcycle racing season
- Date: October 15, 2017
- Official name: Motul Grand Prix of Japan
- Location: Twin Ring Motegi
- Course: Permanent racing facility; 4.801 km (2.983 mi)

MotoGP
Pole position
Rider	(France) Johann Zarco	Yamaha
Time	1:53.469	
Fastest lap
Rider	(Italy) Andrea Dovizioso	Ducati
Time	1:56.568 on lap 18	
Podium
First	(Italy) Andrea Dovizioso	Ducati
Second	(Spain) Marc Márquez	Honda
Third	(Italy) Danilo Petrucci	Ducati

Moto2
Pole position
Rider	(Japan) Takaaki Nakagami	Kalex
Time	1:53.776	
Fastest lap
Rider	(Spain) Álex Márquez	Kalex
Time	2:07.057 on lap 14	
Podium
First	(Spain) Álex Márquez	Kalex
Second	(Spain) Xavi Vierge	Tech 3
Third	(Malaysia) Hafizh Syahrin	Kalex

Moto3
Pole position
Rider	(Italy) Nicolò Bulega	KTM
Time	2:09.320	
Fastest lap
Rider	(Italy) Romano Fenati	Honda
Time	2:13.906 on lap 9	
Podium
First	(Italy) Romano Fenati	Honda
Second	(Italy) Niccolò Antonelli	KTM
Third	(Italy) Marco Bezzecchi	Mahindra

The 2017 Japanese motorcycle Grand Prix was the fifteenth round of the 2017 MotoGP season. It was held at the Twin Ring Motegi in Motegi on October 15, 2017. Andrea Dovizioso won his fifth race of the season after a last lap battle with championship leader Marc Márquez, shrinking his lead to 11 points with three rounds left to race. Danilo Petrucci finished in third place over 10 seconds behind the leaders, while Team Suzuki teammates Andrea Iannone and Álex Rins finished fourth and fifth respectively.

== Report ==
=== Background ===
During the previous round in Aragon, Marc Márquez won the race which extended his championship lead over Andrea Dovizioso to 16 points.

Jack Miller missed the weekend due to an injury sustained to his right tibia during a test two weeks before the race, former 250cc world champion and Honda test rider Hiroshi Aoyama replacing him throughout the weekend. Jonas Folger would also miss the race weekend due to a recurring battle with Epstein-Barr virus and would fly back to his home in Germany to recover, he was replaced by his team with Japanese rider Kohta Nozane.

=== Practice and Qualifying ===
During both practice sessions on Friday, rain dominated the race track. On the first practice session, Marquez finished with the fastest time.

With rain still occurring throughout the second practice, Dovizioso would run the fastest time of the weekend with Márquez finishing 0.2 seconds behind despite nearly falling off his Honda when setting his laps. Surprisingly, Aleix Espargaró would set the third quickest time of the session, producing it on the last lap of the session, while Dovizioso's Ducati teammate Jorge Lorenzo finished fourth and Johann Zarco would finish fifth.

Both KTM's would qualify to Q2, with Pol Espargaro ending the session in first place and Bradley Smith in second.

At the beginning of Q2, Rossi grabbed attention by choosing to set his first laps on slick tyres with rain still falling on the track. With five minutes to go in the session, Rossi's decision to start on slick tyres didn't work, while Marquez made the decision to complete his second qualifying run on slick tyres. Zarco's pole would surprise everyone, despite the domination of Marquez and Dovizioso throughout the practice sessions. Marquez would qualify in third place, while Dovizioso qualified in ninth.

=== Race ===
The race was conducted in pouring rain which was to remain throughout the entirety of the race, with concerns over water flooding the track and poor visibility for the riders, leaving doubts as to whether the race would be safe enough to run full distance. Márquez led the field into turn one, with Lorenzo leading the field after the first lap after an incredible start on his Ducati, while Zarco dropped to the middle of the field after a terrible start at pole position. Petrucci took the lead from Lorenzo during the second lap and would be joined by Marquez and Dovizioso on the same lap, with Lorenzo dropping to fourth by the third lap. Petrucci continued to extend his lead through most of the opening half of the race, leading the championship contenders by over a second. Rossi became the first casualty of the race, while catching up and passing teammate Vinales in eighth place he would lose control of his bike, sliding into a nearby gravel trap and was unable to get his bike restarted.

As riders continued to battle throughout the entire field, the race conditions gradually became worse with tyre spray impacting rider visibility due to the close proximity and battles with fellow riders. With eleven laps to go, both Márquez and Dovizioso overtook Petrucci who would remain in third for the rest of the race with a "cat and mouse battle" happening between first and second. During lap 19, Dovizioso made his first overtake on Marquez for the lead, setting the fastest lap of the race in the previous lap and began opening up a slight 0.8 second lead. Three laps to go, Márquez took the lead back from Dovizioso and prepared to generate a slight lead throughout, which allowed Dovizioso to rethink a new strategy, to attack on the final lap. On the final lap, Márquez and Dovizioso had a slight 0.2 second gap between them, with Marquez the first to make a mistake by running wide and nearly high-siding off the bike at turn 8, which allowed Dovizioso room to pass him and take the lead. In a last ditch attempt to win, Marquez tried to overtake Dovizioso on the last corner, being able to get on the inside of the corner taking the lead back although would run ride when exiting the corner onto home straight, giving Dovizioso enough space to retake the lead and win the race.

=== Post-Race ===
The race is said to have cemented Dovizioso's ability to be able to fight for a championship, which was highly debated throughout the season as he continued his surprise charge at the championship. Marquez remarked on the Ducati's incredible speed throughout the back straight as a weak point of his during the race, "I knew the Ducati was faster on the back straight, even in the braking point," when speaking about Dovizioso's victory Marquez stated he knew Dovizioso would be strong at Motegi as the track works to the Ducati's strengths, despite it being Honda's home track.

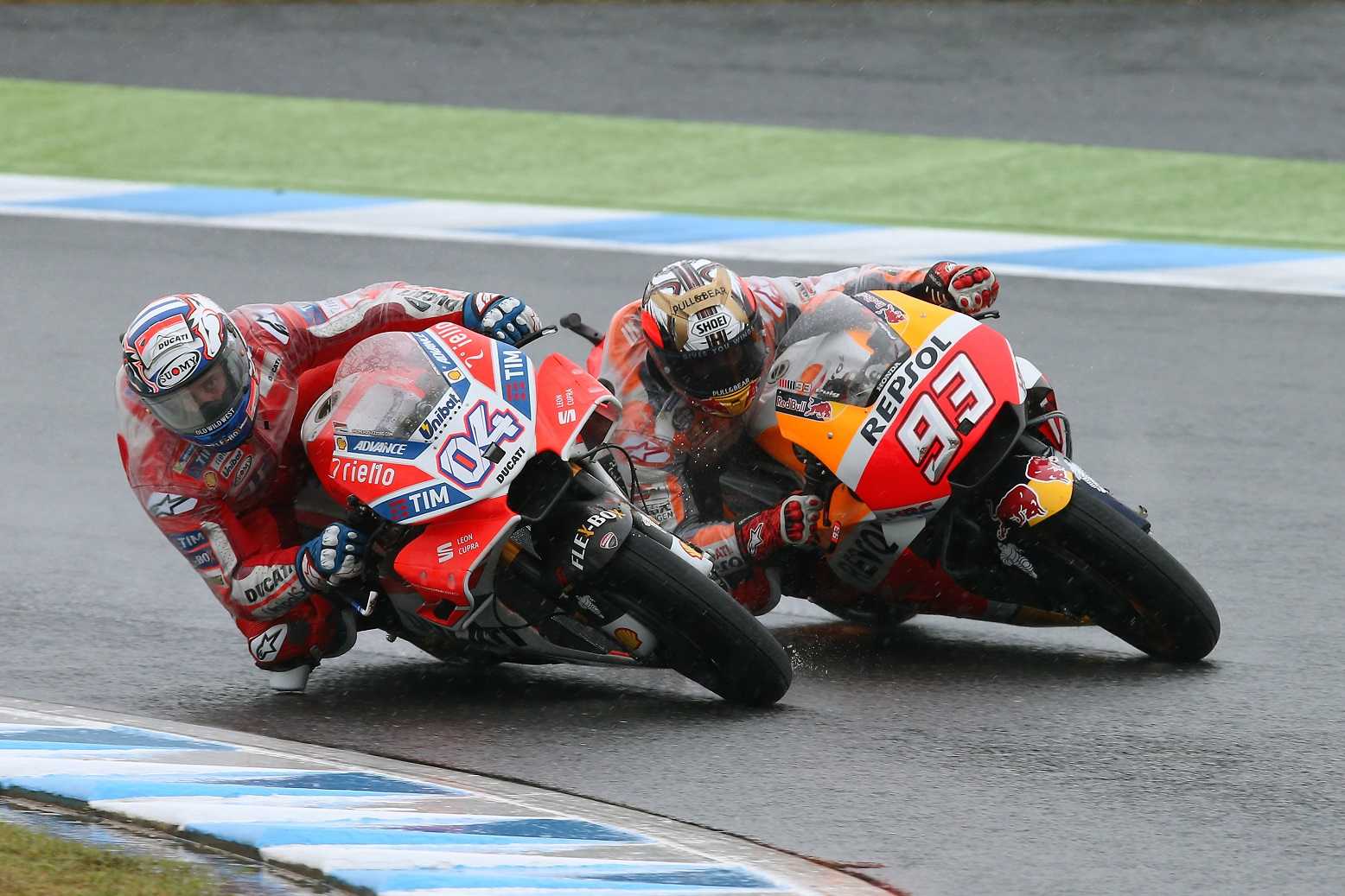
Andrea Dovizioso and Marc Márquez, battling in the pouring rain for the lead at the MotoGP race. Dovizioso won the race, with Márquez finishing a close second

== Classification ==
=== MotoGP ===
Pos.	No.	Rider	Team	Manufacturer	Laps	Time/Retired	Grid	Points
1	4	(Italy) Andrea Dovizioso	Ducati Team	Ducati	24	47:14.236	9	25
2	93	(Spain) Marc Márquez	Repsol Honda Team	Honda	24	+0.249	3	20
3	9	(Italy) Danilo Petrucci	Octo Pramac Racing	Ducati	24	+10.557	2	16
4	29	(Italy) Andrea Iannone	Team Suzuki Ecstar	Suzuki	24	+18.845	11	13
5	42	(Spain) Álex Rins	Team Suzuki Ecstar	Suzuki	24	+22.982	10	11
6	99	(Spain) Jorge Lorenzo	Ducati Team	Ducati	24	+24.464	5	10
7	41	(Spain) Aleix Espargaró	Aprilia Racing Team Gresini	Aprilia	24	+28.010	4	9
8	5	(France) Johann Zarco	Monster Yamaha Tech 3	Yamaha	24	+29.475	1	8
9	25	(Spain) Maverick Viñales	Movistar Yamaha MotoGP	Yamaha	24	+36.575	14	7
10	76	(France) Loris Baz	Reale Avintia Racing	Ducati	24	+48.506	13	6
11	44	(Spain) Pol Espargaró	Red Bull KTM Factory Racing	KTM	24	+56.357	8	5
12	21	(Japan) Katsuyuki Nakasuga	Yamalube Yamaha Factory Racing	Yamaha	24	+1:00.181	23	4
13	22	(United Kingdom) Sam Lowes	Aprilia Racing Team Gresini	Aprilia	24	+1:00.980	18	3
14	8	(Spain) Héctor Barberá	Reale Avintia Racing	Ducati	24	+1:03.118	17	2
15	53	(Spain) Tito Rabat	EG 0,0 Marc VDS	Honda	24	+1:03.514	19	1
16	45	(United Kingdom) Scott Redding	Octo Pramac Racing	Ducati	24	+1:04.162	22	
17	38	(United Kingdom) Bradley Smith	Red Bull KTM Factory Racing	KTM	24	+1:06.271	7	
18	7	(Japan) Hiroshi Aoyama	EG 0,0 Marc VDS	Honda	24	+1:13.250	21	
Ret	19	(Spain) Álvaro Bautista	Pull&Bear Aspar Team	Ducati	21	Accident	16	
Ret	26	(Spain) Dani Pedrosa	Repsol Honda Team	Honda	20	Rear Tyre	6	
Ret	17	(Czech Republic) Karel Abraham	Pull&Bear Aspar Team	Ducati	19	Handling	20	
Ret	35	(United Kingdom) Cal Crutchlow	LCR Honda	Honda	14	Accident	15	
Ret	46	(Italy) Valentino Rossi	Movistar Yamaha MotoGP	Yamaha	5	Accident	12	
Ret	31	(Japan) Kohta Nozane	Monster Yamaha Tech 3	Yamaha	3	Accident Damage	24	

=== Moto2 ===
Pos.	No.	Rider	Manufacturer	Laps	Time/Retired	Grid	Points
1	73	(Spain) Álex Márquez	Kalex	15	32:08.901	2	25
2	97	(Spain) Xavi Vierge	Tech 3	15	+1.465	3	20
3	55	(Malaysia) Hafizh Syahrin	Kalex	15	+3.134	6	16
4	42	(Italy) Francesco Bagnaia	Kalex	15	+5.415	12	13
5	54	(Italy) Mattia Pasini	Kalex	15	+5.618	4	11
6	30	(Japan) Takaaki Nakagami	Kalex	15	+6.163	1	10
7	44	(Portugal) Miguel Oliveira	KTM	15	+7.597	5	9
8	21	(Italy) Franco Morbidelli	Kalex	15	+11.400	15	8
9	77	(Switzerland) Dominique Aegerter	Suter	15	+11.572	11	7
10	7	(Italy) Lorenzo Baldassarri	Kalex	15	+14.310	30	6
11	12	(Switzerland) Thomas Lüthi	Kalex	15	+26.571	13	5
12	87	(Australia) Remy Gardner	Tech 3	15	+30.183	19	4
13	23	(Germany) Marcel Schrötter	Suter	15	+30.597	8	3
14	33	(Japan) Ikuhiro Enokido	Kalex	15	+32.037	25	2
15	6	(United Kingdom) Tarran Mackenzie	Suter	15	+35.252	31	1
16	37	(Spain) Augusto Fernández	Speed Up	15	+38.385	10	
17	27	(Spain) Iker Lecuona	Kalex	15	+40.934	18	
18	49	(Spain) Axel Pons	Kalex	15	+41.470	16	
19	40	(France) Fabio Quartararo	Kalex	15	+42.757	17	
20	45	(Japan) Tetsuta Nagashima	Kalex	15	+43.147	29	
21	24	(Italy) Simone Corsi	Speed Up	15	+45.410	28	
22	34	(Japan) Ryo Mizuno	Kalex	15	+46.813	23	
23	89	(Malaysia) Khairul Idham Pawi	Kalex	15	+50.531	33	
24	32	(Spain) Isaac Viñales	Kalex	15	+51.898	22	
25	2	(Switzerland) Jesko Raffin	Kalex	15	+53.699	27	
26	62	(Italy) Stefano Manzi	Kalex	15	+1:01.051	20	
27	57	(Spain) Edgar Pons	Kalex	15	+1:04.776	32	
28	9	(Spain) Jorge Navarro	Kalex	15	+1:07.423	26	
Ret	41	(South Africa) Brad Binder	KTM	7	Accident	24	
Ret	5	(Italy) Andrea Locatelli	Kalex	6	Accident Damage	14	
Ret	11	(Germany) Sandro Cortese	Suter	6	Accident Damage	7	
Ret	19	(Belgium) Xavier Siméon	Kalex	5	Accident	9	
Ret	10	(Italy) Luca Marini	Kalex	1	Accident	21	
OFFICIAL MOTO2 REPORT

=== Moto3 ===
Pos.	No.	Rider	Manufacturer	Laps	Time/Retired	Grid	Points
1	5	(Italy) Romano Fenati	Honda	13	29:22.278	6	25
2	23	(Italy) Niccolò Antonelli	KTM	13	+4.146	2	20
3	12	(Italy) Marco Bezzecchi	Mahindra	13	+5.013	4	16
4	24	(Japan) Tatsuki Suzuki	Honda	13	+8.767	14	13
5	44	(Spain) Arón Canet	Honda	13	+12.827	3	11
6	65	(Germany) Philipp Öttl	KTM	13	+14.865	21	10
7	21	(Italy) Fabio Di Giannantonio	Honda	13	+15.482	16	9
8	84	(Czech Republic) Jakub Kornfeil	Peugeot	13	+15.625	19	8
9	64	(Netherlands) Bo Bendsneyder	KTM	13	+15.947	11	7
10	17	(United Kingdom) John McPhee	Honda	13	+16.216	17	6
11	41	(Thailand) Nakarin Atiratphuvapat	Honda	13	+16.414	12	5
12	8	(Italy) Nicolò Bulega	KTM	13	+18.783	1	4
13	16	(Italy) Andrea Migno	KTM	13	+19.057	10	3
14	42	(Spain) Marcos Ramírez	KTM	13	+19.536	22	2
15	88	(Spain) Jorge Martín	Honda	13	+21.208	7	1
16	33	(Italy) Enea Bastianini	Honda	13	+22.731	5	
17	36	(Spain) Joan Mir	Honda	13	+23.879	20 (Note: 6-place grid penalty.)	
18	95	(France) Jules Danilo	Honda	13	+23.935	23	
19	11	(Belgium) Livio Loi	Honda	13	+33.663	15	
20	40	(South Africa) Darryn Binder	KTM	13	+34.695	25	
21	27	(Japan) Kaito Toba	Honda	13	+39.533	27	
22	4	(Finland) Patrik Pulkkinen	Peugeot	13	+48.473	28	
23	14	(Italy) Tony Arbolino	Honda	13	+1:30.837	29	
24	70	(Australia) Tom Toparis	KTM	13	+2:18.580	30	
Ret	58	(Spain) Juan Francisco Guevara	KTM	11	Accident	18	
Ret	19	(Argentina) Gabriel Rodrigo	KTM	9	Collision	8	
Ret	71	(Japan) Ayumu Sasaki	Honda	9	Collision	24	
Ret	7	(Malaysia) Adam Norrodin	Honda	6	Accident	13	
Ret	96	(Italy) Manuel Pagliani	Mahindra	1	Accident	9	
Ret	48	(Italy) Lorenzo Dalla Porta	Mahindra	0	Engine	26	
DNS	75	(Spain) Albert Arenas	Mahindra		Did not start		
OFFICIAL MOTO3 REPORT

- Albert Arenas suffered a broken right hand in a crash during qualifying and withdrew from the event.

== Championship standings after the race ==
=== MotoGP ===
Below are the standings for the top five riders and constructors after round fifteen has concluded.

Riders' Championship standings

Pos.	Rider	Points
1	(Spain) Marc Márquez	244
2	(Italy) Andrea Dovizioso	233
3	(Spain) Maverick Viñales	203
4	(Spain) Dani Pedrosa	170
5	(Italy) Valentino Rossi	168

Constructors' Championship standings

Pos.	Constructor	Points
1	(Japan) Honda	294
2	(Italy) Ducati	273
3	(Japan) Yamaha	265
4	(Japan) Suzuki	77
5	(Italy) Aprilia	64

- Note: Only the top five positions are included for both sets of standings.

=== Moto2 ===
Pos.	Rider	Points
1	(Italy) Franco Morbidelli	256
2	(Switzerland) Thomas Lüthi	237
3	(Spain) Álex Márquez	180
4	(Portugal) Miguel Oliveira	166
5	(Italy) Francesco Bagnaia	146
6	(Italy) Mattia Pasini	135
7	(Japan) Takaaki Nakagami	128
8	(Italy) Simone Corsi	96
9	(Malaysia) Hafizh Syahrin	86
10	(Spain) Xavi Vierge	79

=== Moto3 ===
Pos.	Rider	Points
1	(Spain) Joan Mir	271
2	(Italy) Romano Fenati	216
3	(Spain) Arón Canet	184
4	(Italy) Fabio Di Giannantonio	146
5	(Spain) Jorge Martín	135
6	(United Kingdom) John McPhee	112
7	(Spain) Marcos Ramírez	107
8	(Italy) Andrea Migno	106
9	(Italy) Enea Bastianini	103
10	(Germany) Philipp Öttl	101

== Notes ==
Previous race: 2017 Aragon Grand Prix	FIM Grand Prix World Championship; 2017 season	Next race: 2017 Australian Grand Prix
Previous race: 2016 Japanese Grand Prix	Japanese motorcycle Grand Prix	Next race: 2018 Japanese Grand Prix
