= List of Grand Prix motorcycle racers: P =

Name	Seasons	World Championships	MotoGP Wins	500cc Wins	350cc Wins	Moto2 Wins	250cc Wins	Moto3 Wins	125cc Wins	80cc Wins	50cc Wins	MotoE Wins
(Italy) Alberto Pagani	1959-1972	0	0	3	0	0	0	0	0	0	0	0
(Italy) Nello Pagani	1949-1955	1 125cc - 1949	0	2	0	0	0	0	2	0	0	0
(Italy) Manuel Pagliani	2015, 2017-2018	0	0	0	0	0	0	0	0	0	0	0
(Italy) Alessio Palumbo	2006	0	0	0	0	0	0	0	0	0	0	0
(Australia) Broc Parkes	1999. 2014-2015, 2017	0	0	0	0	0	0	0	0	0	0	0
(Italy) Mattia Pasini	2004-2020, 2022-2025	0	0	0	0	2	2	0	8	0	0	0
(Italy) Renzo Pasolini	1964-1973	0	0	0	0	0	6	0	0	0	0	0
(Malaysia) Khairul Idham Pawi	2015-2020, 2024	0	0	0	0	0	0	2	0	0	0	0
(Spain) Dani Pedrosa	2001-2018, 2021, 2023-2024	3 125cc - 2003250cc - 2004-2005	31	0	0	0	15	0	8	0	0	0
(Spain) Diego Pérez	2025	0	0	0	0	0	0	0	0	0	0	0
(Spain) Mika Pérez	2023	0	0	0	0	0	0	0	0	0	0	0
(Spain) Vicente Pérez	2016-2019, 2022-2025	0	0	0	0	0	0	0	0	0	0	0
(Argentina) Fabricio Perren	2004, 2006	0	0	0	0	0	0	0	0	0	0	0
(Argentina) Valentín Perrone	2025-	0	0	0	0	0	0	0	0	0	0	0
(Czech Republic) Lukáš Pešek	2002-2010, 2013	0	0	0	0	0	0	0	0	0	0	0
(United Kingdom) Bill Petch	1949-1953	0	0	0	0	0	0	0	0	0	0	0
(Italy) Lorenzo Petrarca	2014, 2016	0	0	0	0	0	0	0	0	0	0	0
(Italy) Danilo Petrucci	2012-2023	0	2	0	0	0	0	0	0	0	0	0
(United Kingdom) Roland Pike	1950, 1952	0	0	0	0	0	0	0	0	0	0	0
(Italy) Paolo Pileri	1973-1979	1 125cc - 1975	0	0	0	0	1	0	7	0	0	0
(Italy) Guido Pini	2025-	0	0	0	0	0	0	1	0	0	0	0
(Portugal) André Pires	2021	0	0	0	0	1	0	0	0	0	0	0
(Italy) Michele Pirro	2003-	0	0	0	0	1	0	0	0	0	0	0
(Italy) Davide Pizzoli	2015-2016, 2019-2020	0	0	0	0	0	0	0	0	0	0	0
(San Marino) Manuel Poggiali	1999-2006, 2008	2 125cc - 2001250cc - 2003	0	0	0	0	5	0	7	0	0	0
(Spain) Axel Pons	2008-2017	0	0	0	0	0	0	0	0	0	0	0
(Spain) Edgar Pons	2014-2018, 2020	0	0	0	0	0	0	0	0	0	0	0
(Spain) Miquel Pons	2021-2024	0	0	0	0	0	0	0	0	0	0	1
(France) Patrick Pons	1973-1980	0	0	0	0	0	0	0	0	0	0	0
(Spain) Sito Pons	1981-1991	2 50cc - 1988-1989	0	0	0	0	15	0	0	0	0	0
(France) Christophe Ponsson	2018	0	0	0	0	0	0	0	0	0	0	0
(Italy) Lorenzo Dalla Porta	2015-2023	1 Moto3 - 2019	0	0	0	0	0	5	0	0	0	0
(Argentina) Sebastián Porto	1994-2006, 2014	0	0	0	0	0	7	0	0	0	0	0
(Indonesia) Dimas Ekky Pratama	2017-2019, 2021	0	0	0	0	0	0	0	0	0	0	0
(Indonesia) Veda Pratama	2026-	0	0	0	0	0	0	0	0	0	0	0
(Italy) Tarquinio Provini	1954-1966	2 125cc - 1957250cc - 1958	0	0	0	0	14	0	6	0	0	0
(Finland) Patrik Pulkkinen	2017	0	0	0	0	0	0	0	0	0	0	0
(Spain) Alberto Puig	1987-1997	0	0	1	0	0	0	0	0	0	0	0
(France) Randy de Puniet	1998-2014, 2019	0	0	0	0	0	5	0	0	0	0	0
(United Kingdom) Brian Purslow	1954	0	0	0	0	0	0	0	0	0	0	0
(United Kingdom) Fron Purslow	1951, 1953-1954	0	0	0	0	0	0	0	0	0	0	0
