= Jasper Iwema =

Dutch motorcycle racer

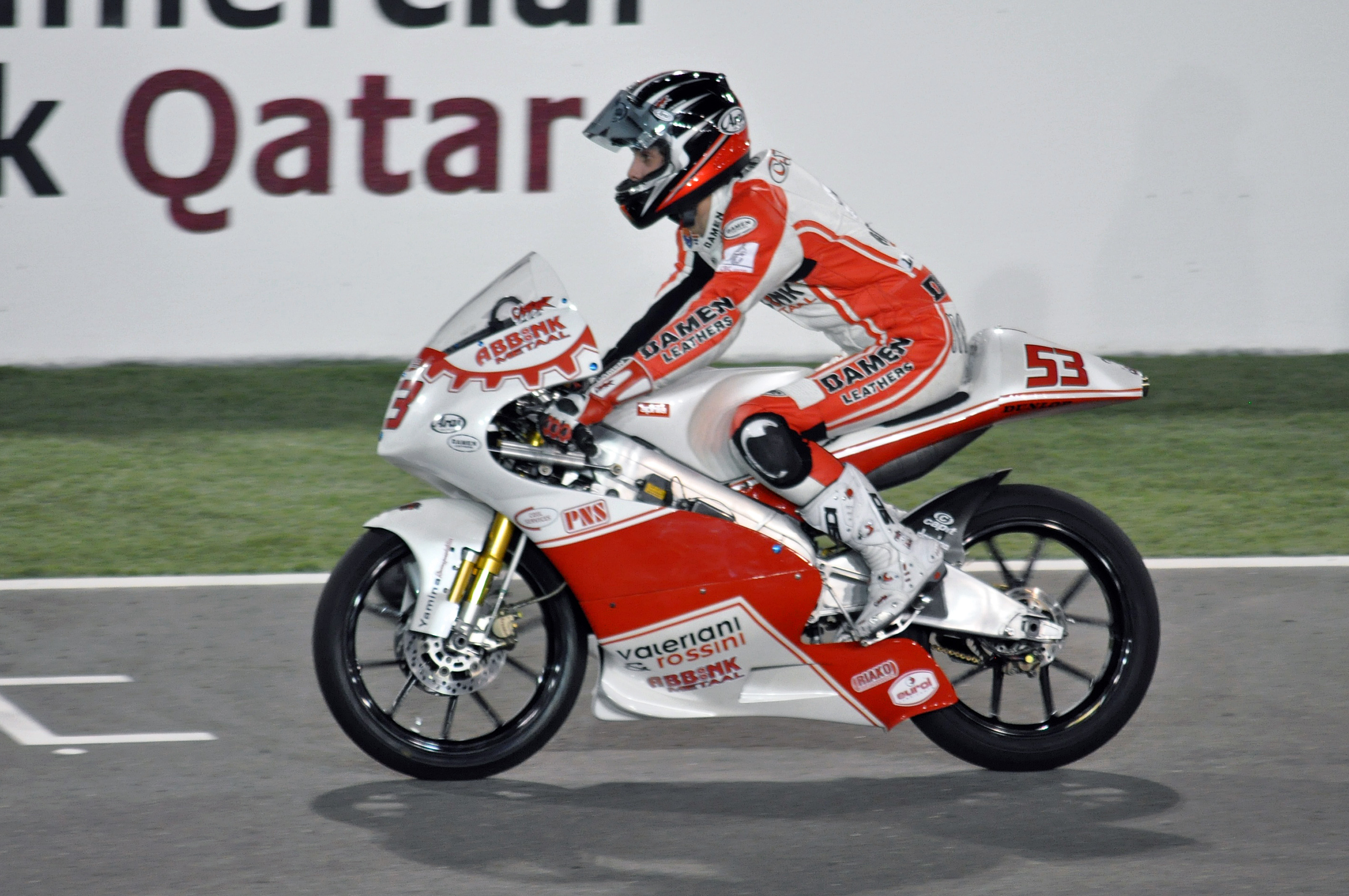
- Iwema at the 2010 Qatar Grand Prix.
- Nationality: Dutch
- Born: November 15, 1989 (age 37); Hooghalen, Netherlands
- Current team: Pons Racing 40
- Bike number: 80
- Website: jasperiwema.com
Motorcycle racing career statistics
Moto2 World Championship
Active years	2015
Manufacturers	Speed Up
Championships	0
2015 championship position	NC (0 pts)
Starts / Wins / Podiums / Poles / F. laps / Points; 1 / 0 / 0 / 0 / 0 / 0
Moto3 World Championship
Active years	2012–2014
Manufacturers	FGR Honda, Kalex KTM, FTR KTM, Mahindra
Championships	0
2014 championship position	27th (4 pts)
Starts / Wins / Podiums / Poles / F. laps / Points; 37 / 0 / 0 / 0 / 0 / 21
125cc World Championship
Active years	2007–2011
Manufacturers	Honda, Seel, Aprilia
Championships	0
2011 championship position	23rd (16 pts)
Starts / Wins / Podiums / Poles / F. laps / Points; 50 / 0 / 0 / 0 / 0 / 53
MotoE World Championship
Active years	2021
Manufacturers	Energica
2021 championship position	17th (13 pts)
Starts / Wins / Podiums / Poles / F. laps / Points; 7 / 0 / 0 / 0 / 0 / 13

Jasper Iwema (born 15 November 1989 in Hooghalen, Netherlands) is a Dutch motorcycle rider. He previously competed in the 125cc World Championship, the FIM CEV Moto2 European Championship, the FIM CEV Moto3 Championship, the ADAC Junior Cup and the German IDM 125GP Championship.

== Career statistics ==
=== FIM CEV Moto3 Junior World Championship ===
==== Races by year ====
(key) (Races in bold indicate pole position; races in italics indicate fastest lap)

Year	Bike	1	2	3	4	5	6	7	8	9	10	11	Pos	Pts
2014	FTR Honda	JER1; 14	JER2; 17	LMS; 24	ARA	CAT1	CAT2	ALB	NAV	ALG	VAL1	VAL2	19th	22
2014	FTR/KTM	JER1	JER2	LMS	ARA	CAT1	CAT2	ALB	NAV	ALG	VAL1; 6	VAL2; 6	19th	22

=== FIM CEV Moto2 European Championship ===
==== Races by year ====
(key) (Races in bold indicate pole position) (Races in italics indicate fastest lap)

Year	Bike	1	2	3	4	5	6	7	8	9	10	11	Pos	Pts
2015	MVR	ALG1; 31	ALG2; Ret	CAT	ARA1	ARA2	ALB	NAV1	NAV2	JER	VAL1	VAL2	NC	0

=== Grand Prix motorcycle racing ===
==== By season ====
Season	Class	Motorcycle	Team	Race	Win	Podium	Pole	FLap	Pts	Plcd
2007	125cc	Honda	Abbink Bos Racing	1	0	0	0	0	0	NC
2008	125cc	Seel	Abbink Bos Racing	1	0	0	0	0	0	NC
2009	125cc	Honda	Racing Team Germany	15	0	0	0	0	3	28th
2010	125cc	Aprilia	CBC Corse	16	0	0	0	0	34	16th
2011	125cc	Aprilia	Ongetta-Abbink Metaal	17	0	0	0	0	16	23rd
2012	Moto3	FGR Honda	Moto FGR	13	0	0	0	0	9	26th
2013	Moto3	Kalex KTM	RW Racing GP	17	0	0	0	0	8	24th
2014	Moto3	FTR KTM	KRP Abbink Racing	7	0	0	0	0	4	27th
2014	Moto3	Mahindra	CIP	7	0	0	0	0	4	27th
2015	Moto2	Speed Up	Abbink GP	1	0	0	0	0	0	NC
2021	MotoE	Energica	Pons Racing 40	7	0	0	0	0	13	17th
Total				**95**	**0**	**0**	**0**	**0**	**87**	

==== By class ====
Class	Seasons	1st GP	1st Pod	1st Win	Race	Win	Podiums	Pole	FLap	Pts	WChmp
125cc	2007–2011	2007 Netherlands			50	0	0	0	0	53	0
Moto3	2012–2014	2012 Qatar			37	0	0	0	0	21	0
Moto2	2015	2015 Netherlands			1	0	0	0	0	0	0
MotoE	2021–present	2021 Spain			7	0	0	0	0	13	0
Total	2007–2015, 2021–present				**95**	**0**	**0**	**0**	**0**	**87**	**0**

==== Races by year ====
(key) (Races in bold indicate pole position; races in italics indicate fastest lap)

Year	Class	Bike	1	2	3	4	5	6	7	8	9	10	11	12	13	14	15	16	17	18	Pos	Pts
2007	125cc	Honda	QAT	SPA	TUR	CHN	FRA	ITA	CAT	GBR	NED; 32	GER	CZE	RSM	POR	JPN	AUS	MAL	VAL		NC	0
2008	125cc	Seel	QAT	SPA	POR	CHN	FRA	ITA	CAT	GBR	NED; 28	GER	CZE	RSM	INP	JPN	AUS	MAL	VAL		NC	0
2009	125cc	Honda	QAT; 23	JPN; Ret	SPA; 24	FRA; 13	ITA; 23	CAT; 21	NED; 19	GER; 19	GBR; Ret	CZE; Ret	INP	RSM; 23	POR; 17	AUS; 22	MAL; 18	VAL; 18			28th	3
2010	125cc	Aprilia	QAT; 14	SPA; 10	FRA; 12	ITA; 14	GBR; 13	NED; 13	CAT; Ret	GER; Ret	CZE; 8	INP; 11	RSM; 21	ARA; Ret	JPN; 15	MAL; Ret	AUS; 16	POR; Ret	VAL		16th	34
2011	125cc	Aprilia	QAT; 12	SPA; Ret	POR; Ret	FRA; 18	CAT; 17	GBR; Ret	NED; Ret	ITA; 14	GER; 15	CZE; 10	INP; 16	RSM; Ret	ARA; Ret	JPN; 13	AUS; Ret	MAL; Ret	VAL; 20		23rd	16
2012	Moto3	FGR Honda	QAT; 24	SPA; 17	POR; Ret	FRA; 7	CAT; 16	GBR; 18	NED; 24	GER; Ret	ITA; Ret	INP; Ret	CZE; 24	RSM; Ret	ARA; Ret	JPN	MAL	AUS	VAL		26th	9
2013	Moto3	Kalex KTM	QAT; 13	AME; Ret	SPA; 14	FRA; 21	ITA; 15	CAT; Ret	NED; Ret	GER; 14	INP; Ret	CZE; 16	GBR; 28	RSM; 21	ARA; 22	MAL; Ret	AUS; 20	JPN; 25	VAL; 21		24th	8
2014	Moto3	FTR KTM	QAT	AME	ARG	SPA	FRA	ITA	CAT	NED; 12	GER	INP	CZE	GBR; 23	RSM						27th	4
2014	Moto3	Mahindra														ARA; 16	JPN; 20	AUS; 16	MAL; Ret	VAL; 20	27th	4
2015	Moto2	Speed Up	QAT	AME	ARG	SPA	FRA	ITA	CAT	NED; 25	GER	INP	CZE	GBR	RSM	ARA	JPN	AUS	MAL	VAL	NC	0
2021	MotoE	Energica	SPA; 11	FRA; 14	CAT; Ret	NED; 16	AUT; 14	RSM1; 14	RSM2; 14												17th	13
