= Yonny Hernández (motorcyclist) =

Colombian motorcycle racer (born 1988)

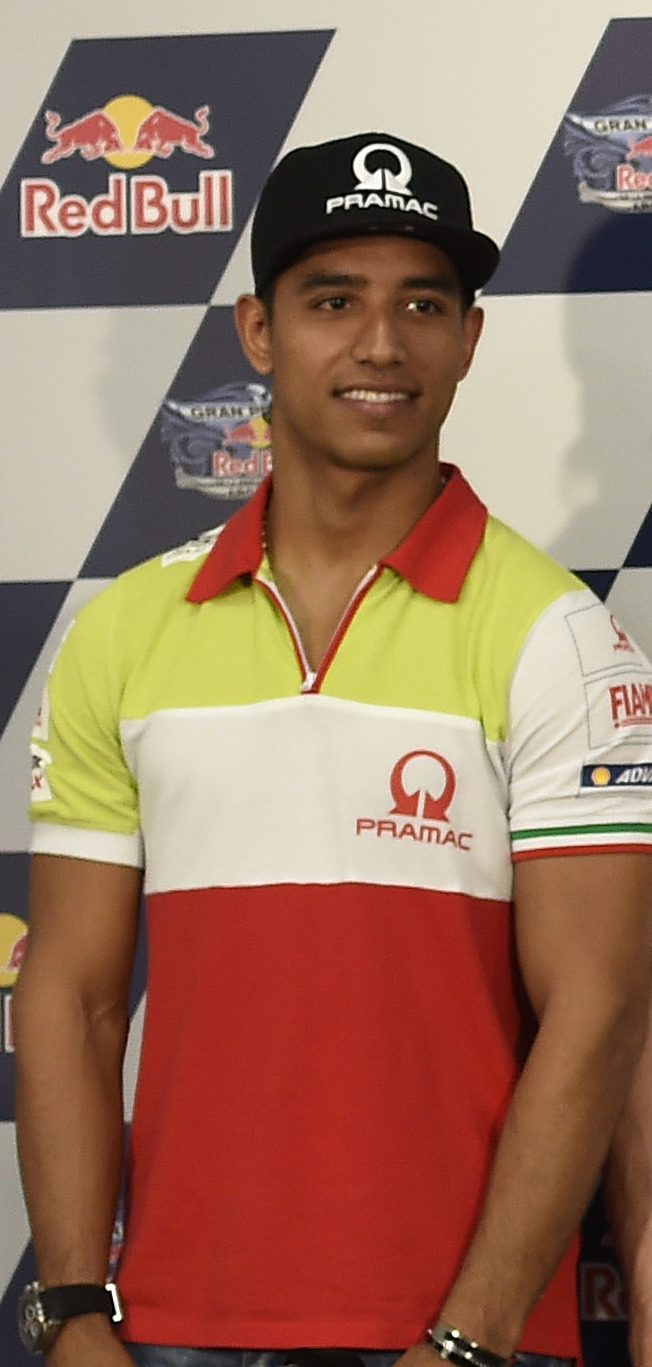
- Hernández in 2015
- Nationality: Colombian
- Born: 25 July 1988 (age 38); Medellín, Colombia
- Bike number: 68
Motorcycle racing career statistics
MotoGP World Championship
Active years	2012–2016
Manufacturers	BQR-FTR, BQR, ART, Ducati
Championships	0
2016 championship position	22nd (20 pts)
Starts / Wins / Podiums / Poles / F. laps / Points; 87 / 0 / 0 / 0 / 0 / 178
Moto2 World Championship
Active years	2010–2011, 2017
Manufacturers	BQR, FTR, Kalex
Championships	0
2017 championship position	24th (16 pts)
Starts / Wins / Podiums / Poles / F. laps / Points; 40 / 0 / 0 / 0 / 1 / 91
MotoE World Championship
Active years	2021–
Manufacturers	Energica
2021 championship position	10th (47 pts)
Starts / Wins / Podiums / Poles / F. laps / Points; 7 / 0 / 0 / 0 / 0 / 47
Superbike World Championship
Active years	2018
Manufacturers	Kawasaki
Championships	0
2018 championship position	18th (28 pts)
Starts / Wins / Podiums / Poles / F. laps / Points; 17 / 0 / 0 / 0 / 0 / 28

Yonny Hernández Vega (born 25 July 1988) is a Colombian motorcycle racer. He is the older brother of Santiago Hernández.

== Career ==
In 2018, Hernández competed as a test rider for the Monster Energy Yamaha Tech3 team in the 2018 MotoGP pre-season test at the Sepang International Circuit. He appeared as a replacement for Jonas Folger who was absent due to health problems. The pre-season test in Sepang was his first opportunity to try out the Yamaha YZR-M1. In his five seasons of participation in MotoGP, he had never defended a Yamaha motorbike team, as most of his career in MotoGP was spent as a Ducati rider.

== Career statistics ==
2003: 1st, Colombian Motocross 85cc Championship 2004: 2nd, Colombian Motocross 85cc Championship 2005: 1st, Colombian Motocross 85cc Championship 2007: 1st, Colombian Supermoto Championship

=== Grand Prix motorcycle racing ===
==== By season ====
Season	Class	Motorcycle	Team	Race	Win	Podium	Pole	FLap	Pts	Plcd
2010	Moto2	BQR	Blusens–STX	17	0	0	0	0	32	21st
2011	Moto2	FTR	Blusens–STX	14	0	0	0	1	43	19th
2012	MotoGP	BQR-FTR	Avintia Blusens	15	0	0	0	0	28	17th
2012	MotoGP	BQR	Avintia Blusens	15	0	0	0	0	28	17th
2013	MotoGP	ART	Paul Bird Motorsport	18	0	0	0	0	21	18th
2013	MotoGP	Ducati	Ignite Pramac Racing	18	0	0	0	0	21	18th
2014	MotoGP	Ducati	Energy T.I. Pramac Racing	18	0	0	0	0	53	15th
2015	MotoGP	Ducati	Pramac Racing; Octo Pramac Racing	18	0	0	0	0	56	14th
2016	MotoGP	Ducati	Aspar Team MotoGP; Pull & Bear Aspar Team	18	0	0	0	0	20	22nd
2017	Moto2	Kalex	AGR Team	9	0	0	0	0	16	24th
2021	MotoE	Energica	Pramac MotoE	7	0	0	0	0	47	10th
Total				**134**	**0**	**0**	**0**	**1**	**316**	

==== By class ====
Class	Seasons	1st GP	1st Pod	1st Win	Race	Win	Podiums	Pole	FLap	Pts	WChmp
Moto2	2010–2011, 2017	2010 Qatar			40	0	0	0	1	91	0
MotoGP	2012–2016	2012 Qatar			87	0	0	0	0	178	0
MotoE	2021–present	2021 Spain			7	0	0	0	0	47	0
Total	2010–2017, 2021–present				**134**	**0**	**0**	**0**	**1**	**316**	**0**

==== Races by year ====
(key) (Races in bold indicate pole position; races in italics indicate fastest lap)

Year	Class	Bike	1	2	3	4	5	6	7	8	9	10	11	12	13	14	15	16	17	18	Pos	Pts
2010	Moto2	BQR	QAT; Ret	SPA; 10	FRA; 12	ITA; 20	GBR; Ret	NED; 15	CAT; 12	GER; 10	CZE; 23	INP; 15	RSM; 11	ARA; Ret	JPN; Ret	MAL; 13	AUS; 19	POR; 18	VAL; 14		21st	32
2011	Moto2	FTR	QAT; 12	SPA; 14	POR; 18	FRA; 20	CAT; 9	GBR; 9	NED; 13	ITA; Ret	GER; 6	CZE; Ret	INP	RSM	ARA; DNS	JPN; 23	AUS; 24	MAL; DSQ	VAL; 6		19th	43
2012	MotoGP	BQR-FTR	QAT; 14																		17th	28
2012	MotoGP	BQR		SPA; Ret	POR; Ret	FRA; 15	CAT; 18	GBR; 15	NED; Ret	GER; 14	ITA; Ret	USA; 12	INP; 9	CZE; 12	RSM; 12	ARA; 13	JPN; Ret	MAL; DNS	AUS	VAL	17th	28
2013	MotoGP	ART	QAT; 14	AME; 15	SPA; Ret	FRA; Ret	ITA; 16	CAT; 13	NED; 19	GER; Ret	USA; 15	INP; Ret	CZE; 16	GBR; 20	RSM; Ret						18th	21
2013	MotoGP	Ducati														ARA; 12	MAL; 10	AUS; 13	JPN; 15	VAL; Ret	18th	21
2014	MotoGP	Ducati	QAT; 12	AME; 13	ARG; 12	SPA; 14	FRA; 13	ITA; 10	CAT; 11	NED; 19	GER; 17	INP; Ret	CZE; Ret	GBR; 11	RSM; 10	ARA; 15	JPN; Ret	AUS; 11	MAL; 7	VAL; Ret	15th	53
2015	MotoGP	Ducati	QAT; 10	AME; Ret	ARG; Ret	SPA; 10	FRA; 8	ITA; 10	CAT; Ret	NED; 14	GER; 12	INP; 12	CZE; 11	GBR; Ret	RSM; Ret	ARA; 10	JPN; 14	AUS; 17	MAL; 12	VAL; 13	14th	56
2016	MotoGP	Ducati	QAT; Ret	ARG; Ret	AME; 14	SPA; 15	FRA; Ret	ITA; 16	CAT; 17	NED; Ret	GER; 18	AUT; 17	CZE; 11	GBR; 11	RSM; 16	ARA; 16	JPN; 12	AUS; 13	MAL; Ret	VAL; Ret	22nd	20
2017	Moto2	Kalex	QAT; 18	ARG; 22	AME; Ret	SPA; 9	FRA; 10	ITA; 17	CAT; 15	NED; 14	GER; 17	CZE	AUT	GBR	RSM	ARA	JPN	AUS	MAL	VAL	24th	16
2021	MotoE	Energica	SPA; 10	FRA; 6	CAT; 5	NED; 9	AUT; 10	RSM1; 9	RSM2; Ret												10th	47

=== Superbike World Championship ===
==== Races by year ====
(key) (Races in bold indicate pole position; races in italics indicate fastest lap)

Year	Bike	1		2		3		4		5		6		7		8		9		10		11		12		13		Pos	Pts
Year	Bike	R1	R2	R1	R2	R1	R2	R1	R2	R1	R2	R1	R2	R1	R2	R1	R2	R1	R2	R1	R2	R1	R2	R1	R2	R1	R2	Pos	Pts
2018	Kawasaki	AUS; Ret	AUS; DNS	THA; 16	THA; 11	SPA; 14	SPA; 16	NED; 16	NED; 15	ITA; 17	ITA; 13	GBR	GBR	CZE; 11	CZE; 14	USA; 11	USA; 15	ITA; Ret	ITA; 16	POR; 12	POR; 16	FRA	FRA	ARG	ARG	QAT	QAT	18th	28

=== FIM World Endurance Championship ===
==== By team ====
Year	Team	Bike	Rider	TC
2017–18	(United Kingdom) Honda Endurance Racing	Honda CBR1000RR	(France) Julien Da Costa (France) Sébastien Gimbert (France) Erwan Nigon (Ecuador) Yonny Hernández	3rd
