= 2021 Dutch TT =

Ninth round of the 2021 Grand Prix motorcycle racing season

(Netherlands) 2021 Dutch TT
Race details
- Race 9 of 18 races in the 2021 Grand Prix motorcycle racing season
- Date: 27 June 2021
- Official name: Motul TT Assen
- Location: TT Circuit Assen; Assen, Netherlands
- Course: Permanent racing facility; 4.542 km (2.822 mi)

MotoGP
Pole position
Rider	(Spain) Maverick Viñales	Yamaha
Time	1:31.814	
Fastest lap
Rider	(France) Fabio Quartararo	Yamaha
Time	1:32.869 on lap 8	
Podium
First	(France) Fabio Quartararo	Yamaha
Second	(Spain) Maverick Viñales	Yamaha
Third	(Spain) Joan Mir	Suzuki

Moto2
Pole position
Rider	(Spain) Raúl Fernández	Kalex
Time	1:36.356	
Fastest lap
Rider	(Spain) Raúl Fernández	Kalex
Time	1:36.690 on lap 21	
Podium
First	(Spain) Raúl Fernández	Kalex
Second	(Australia) Remy Gardner	Kalex
Third	(Spain) Augusto Fernández	Kalex

Moto3
Pole position
Rider	(Spain) Jeremy Alcoba	Honda
Time	1:41.194	
Fastest lap
Rider	(Spain) Pedro Acosta	KTM
Time	1:41.618 on lap 16	
Podium
First	(Italy) Dennis Foggia	Honda
Second	(Spain) Sergio García	Gas Gas
Third	(Italy) Romano Fenati	Husqvarna

MotoE
Pole position
Rider	(Brazil) Eric Granado	Energica
Time	1:43.114	
Fastest lap
Rider	(Brazil) Eric Granado	Energica
Time	1:43.184 on lap 3	
Podium
First	(Brazil) Eric Granado	Energica
Second	(Spain) Jordi Torres	Energica
Third	(Italy) Alessandro Zaccone	Energica

The 2021 Dutch TT (officially known as the Motul TT Assen) was the ninth round of the 2021 Grand Prix motorcycle racing season and the fourth round of the 2021 MotoE World Cup. It was held at the TT Circuit Assen in Assen on 27 June 2021.

== Qualifying ==
=== MotoGP ===
Fastest session lap

Pos.	No.	Biker	Constructor	Qualifying times		Final grid	Row
Pos.	No.	Biker	Constructor	Q1	Q2	Final grid	Row
1	12	(Spain) Maverick Viñales	Yamaha	Qualified in Q2	1:31.814	1	1
2	20	(France) Fabio Quartararo	Yamaha	Qualified in Q2	1:31.885	2	1
3	63	(Italy) Francesco Bagnaia	Ducati	1:32.657	1:32.116	3	1
4	30	(Japan) Takaaki Nakagami	Honda	Qualified in Q2	1:32.314	4	2
5	5	(France) Johann Zarco	Ducati	1:32.541	1:32.394	5	2
6	88	(Portugal) Miguel Oliveira	KTM	Qualified in Q2	1:32.450	6	2
7	42	(Spain) Álex Rins	Suzuki	Qualified in Q2	1:32.597	7	3
8	43	(Australia) Jack Miller	Ducati	Qualified in Q2	1:32.609	8	3
9	41	(Spain) Aleix Espargaró	Aprilia	Qualified in Q2	1:32.666	9	3
10	36	(Spain) Joan Mir	Suzuki	Qualified in Q2	1:32.748	10	4
11	44	(Spain) Pol Espargaró	Honda	Qualified in Q2	1:32.830	11	4
12	46	(Italy) Valentino Rossi	Yamaha	Qualified in Q2	1:32.919	12	4
13	27	(Spain) Iker Lecuona	KTM	1:32.724	N/A	13	5
14	89	(Spain) Jorge Martín	Ducati	1:32.850	N/A	14	5
15	32	(Italy) Lorenzo Savadori	Aprilia	1:33.258	N/A	15	5
16	73	(Spain) Álex Márquez	Honda	1:33.288	N/A	16	6
17	10	(Italy) Luca Marini	Ducati	1:33.321	N/A	17	6
18	9	(Italy) Danilo Petrucci	KTM	1:33.378	N/A	18	6
19	23	(Italy) Enea Bastianini	Ducati	1:33.404	N/A	19	7
20	93	(Spain) Marc Márquez	Honda	1:33.477	N/A	20	7
21	33	(South Africa) Brad Binder	KTM	1:33.597	N/A	21	7
22	31	(United States) Garrett Gerloff	Yamaha	1:33.739	N/A	22	8
OFFICIAL MOTOGP QUALIFYING RESULTS

== Race ==
=== MotoGP ===
Pos.	No.	Rider	Team	Manufacturer	Laps	Time/Retired	Grid	Points
1	20	(France) Fabio Quartararo	Monster Energy Yamaha MotoGP	Yamaha	26	40:35.031	2	25
2	12	(Spain) Maverick Viñales	Monster Energy Yamaha MotoGP	Yamaha	26	+2.757	1	20
3	36	(Spain) Joan Mir	Team Suzuki Ecstar	Suzuki	26	+5.760	10	16
4	5	(France) Johann Zarco	Pramac Racing	Ducati	26	+6.130	5	13
5	88	(Portugal) Miguel Oliveira	Red Bull KTM Factory Racing	KTM	26	+8.402	6	11
6	63	(Italy) Francesco Bagnaia	Ducati Lenovo Team	Ducati	26	+10.035	3	10
7	93	(Spain) Marc Márquez	Repsol Honda Team	Honda	26	+10.110	20	9
8	41	(Spain) Aleix Espargaró	Aprilia Racing Team Gresini	Aprilia	26	+10.346	9	8
9	30	(Japan) Takaaki Nakagami	LCR Honda Idemitsu	Honda	26	+12.225	4	7
10	44	(Spain) Pol Espargaró	Repsol Honda Team	Honda	26	+18.565	11	6
11	42	(Spain) Álex Rins	Team Suzuki Ecstar	Suzuki	26	+21.372	7	5
12	33	(South Africa) Brad Binder	Red Bull KTM Factory Racing	KTM	26	+21.676	21	4
13	9	(Italy) Danilo Petrucci	Tech3 KTM Factory Racing	KTM	26	+27.783	18	3
14	73	(Spain) Álex Márquez	LCR Honda Castrol	Honda	26	+29.772	16	2
15	23	(Italy) Enea Bastianini	Avintia Esponsorama	Ducati	26	+32.785	19	1
16	32	(Italy) Lorenzo Savadori	Aprilia Racing Team Gresini	Aprilia	26	+37.573	15	
17	31	(United States) Garrett Gerloff	Petronas Yamaha SRT	Yamaha	26	+53.213	22	
18	10	(Italy) Luca Marini	Sky VR46 Avintia	Ducati	26	+1:06.791	17	
Ret	27	(Spain) Iker Lecuona	Tech3 KTM Factory Racing	KTM	18	Accident	13	
Ret	43	(Australia) Jack Miller	Ducati Lenovo Team	Ducati	18	Oil Leak	8	
Ret	89	(Spain) Jorge Martín	Pramac Racing	Ducati	14	Rider In Pain	14	
Ret	46	(Italy) Valentino Rossi	Petronas Yamaha SRT	Yamaha	7	Accident	12	
Fastest lap: (France) Fabio Quartararo (Yamaha) – 1:32.869 (lap 8)

=== Moto2 ===
Pos.	No.	Rider	Manufacturer	Laps	Time/Retired	Grid	Points
1	25	(Spain) Raúl Fernández	Kalex	24	39:01.832	1	25
2	87	(Australia) Remy Gardner	Kalex	24	+1.066	2	20
3	37	(Spain) Augusto Fernández	Kalex	24	+1.265	7	16
4	22	(United Kingdom) Sam Lowes	Kalex	24	+1.879	3	13
5	72	(Italy) Marco Bezzecchi	Kalex	24	+8.329	16	11
6	79	(Japan) Ai Ogura	Kalex	24	+10.960	5	10
7	9	(Spain) Jorge Navarro	Boscoscuro	24	+13.993	6	9
8	97	(Spain) Xavi Vierge	Kalex	24	+16.052	23	8
9	23	(Germany) Marcel Schrötter	Kalex	24	+16.094	13	7
10	13	(Italy) Celestino Vietti	Kalex	24	+17.585	10	6
11	35	(Thailand) Somkiat Chantra	Kalex	24	+18.286	17	5
12	75	(Spain) Albert Arenas	Boscoscuro	24	+18.812	15	4
13	62	(Italy) Stefano Manzi	Kalex	24	+19.273	22	3
14	12	(Switzerland) Thomas Lüthi	Kalex	24	+19.649	11	2
15	64	(Netherlands) Bo Bendsneyder	Kalex	24	+22.162	12	1
16	6	(United States) Cameron Beaubier	Kalex	24	+22.223	24	
17	2	(Spain) Alonso López	Boscoscuro	24	+25.569	26	
18	96	(United Kingdom) Jake Dixon	Kalex	24	+26.245	21	
19	11	(Italy) Nicolò Bulega	Kalex	24	+27.323	25	
20	42	(Spain) Marcos Ramírez	Kalex	24	+27.463	19	
21	24	(Italy) Simone Corsi	MV Agusta	24	+27.638	20	
22	18	(Spain) Manuel González	MV Agusta	24	+35.908	28	
23	55	(Malaysia) Hafizh Syahrin	NTS	24	+38.517	29	
24	70	(Belgium) Barry Baltus	NTS	24	+46.728	27	
Ret	44	(Spain) Arón Canet	Boscoscuro	19	Accident	4	
Ret	21	(Italy) Fabio Di Giannantonio	Kalex	15	Accident	14	
Ret	16	(United States) Joe Roberts	Kalex	7	Accident Damage	18	
Ret	19	(Italy) Lorenzo Dalla Porta	Kalex	0	Accident	8	
Ret	14	(Italy) Tony Arbolino	Kalex	0	Accident	9	
DNS	40	(Spain) Héctor Garzó	Kalex		Did not start		
OFFICIAL MOTO2 RACE REPORT

- Héctor Garzó withdrew from the event after a positive COVID-19 test.

=== Moto3 ===
Pos.	No.	Rider	Manufacturer	Laps	Time/Retired	Grid	Points
1	7	(Italy) Dennis Foggia	Honda	22	37:35.287	3	25
2	11	(Spain) Sergio García	Gas Gas	22	+0.078	4	20
3	55	(Italy) Romano Fenati	Husqvarna	22	+0.207	2	16
4	37	(Spain) Pedro Acosta	KTM	22	+1.352	18	13
5	24	(Japan) Tatsuki Suzuki	Honda	22	+1.445	12	11
6	17	(United Kingdom) John McPhee	Honda	22	+1.510	11	10
7 (Note: 3-position penalty for exceeding track limits on the last lap.)	40	(South Africa) Darryn Binder	Honda	22	+1.338	8	9
8	2	(Argentina) Gabriel Rodrigo	Honda	22	+9.095	6	8
9	43	(Spain) Xavier Artigas	Honda	22	+9.140	9	7
10	52	(Spain) Jeremy Alcoba	Honda	22	+10.383	1	6
11	82	(Italy) Stefano Nepa	KTM	22	+13.503	25	5
12	28	(Spain) Izan Guevara	Gas Gas	22	+13.555	13	4
13	27	(Japan) Kaito Toba	KTM	22	+21.057	5	3
14	23	(Italy) Niccolò Antonelli	KTM	22	+22.090	7	2
15	53	(Turkey) Deniz Öncü	KTM	22	+27.036	15	1
16	22	(Italy) Elia Bartolini	KTM	22	+35.745	16	
17	6	(Japan) Ryusei Yamanaka	KTM	22	+35.801	22	
18	54	(Italy) Riccardo Rossi	KTM	22	+35.811	27 (Note: Pit lane start penalty.)	
19	67	(Italy) Alberto Surra	Honda	22	+35.879	26	
20	5	(Spain) Jaume Masiá	KTM	22	+45.670	10	
21	20	(France) Lorenzo Fellon	Honda	22	+1:03.492	14	
22	66	(Australia) Joel Kelso	KTM	22	+1:03.552	19	
23	92	(Japan) Yuki Kunii	Honda	22	+1:03.769	20	
24	19	(Indonesia) Andi Farid Izdihar	Honda	22	+1:03.979	24	
25	32	(Japan) Takuma Matsuyama	Honda	22	+1:04.137	23	
Ret	31	(Spain) Adrián Fernández	Husqvarna	13	Accident	21	
Ret	16	(Italy) Andrea Migno	Honda	10	Collision Damage	17	
OFFICIAL MOTO3 RACE REPORT

=== MotoE ===
Pos.	No.	Rider	Laps	Time/Retired	Grid	Points
1	51	(Brazil) Eric Granado	7	12:10.143	1	25
2	40	(Spain) Jordi Torres	7	+0.844	4	20
3	61	(Italy) Alessandro Zaccone	7	+0.925	3	16
4	11	(Italy) Matteo Ferrari	7	+1.518	6	13
5	3	(Germany) Lukas Tulovic	7	+2.656	2	11
6	27	(Italy) Mattia Casadei	7	+2.692	8	10
7	54	(Spain) Fermín Aldeguer	7	+2.742	7	9
8	78	(Japan) Hikari Okubo	7	+4.728	10	8
9	68	(Colombia) Yonny Hernández	7	+4.715	16	7
10	71	(Spain) Miquel Pons	7	+6.652	17	6
11	19	(France) Corentin Perolari	7	+6.836	9	5
12	18	(Andorra) Xavi Cardelús	7	+8.095	18	4
13	21	(Italy) Kevin Zannoni	7	+8.208	11	3
14	9	(Italy) Andrea Mantovani	7	+9.155	13	2
15	6	(Spain) María Herrera	7	+10.270	12	1
16	80	(Netherlands) Jasper Iwema	7	+23.227	14	
17	14	(Portugal) André Pires	7	+29.349	15	
18	77	(Switzerland) Dominique Aegerter	7	+50.109	5	
OFFICIAL MOTOE RACE REPORT

- All bikes manufactured by Energica.

== Championship standings after the race ==
Below are the standings for the top five riders, constructors, and teams after the round.

=== MotoGP ===
Riders' Championship standings

	Pos.	Rider	Points
	1	(France) Fabio Quartararo	156
	2	(France) Johann Zarco	122
1	3	(Italy) Francesco Bagnaia	109
1	4	(Spain) Joan Mir	101
2	5	(Australia) Jack Miller	100

Constructors' Championship standings

Pos.	Constructor	Points
1	(Japan) Yamaha	184
2	(Italy) Ducati	167
3	(Austria) KTM	114
4	(Japan) Suzuki	105
5	(Japan) Honda	86

Teams' Championship standings

Pos.	Team	Points
1	(Japan) Monster Energy Yamaha MotoGP	251
2	(Italy) Ducati Lenovo Team	209
3	(Italy) Pramac Racing	149
4	(Austria) Red Bull KTM Factory Racing	145
5	(Japan) Team Suzuki Ecstar	134

=== Moto2 ===
Riders' Championship standings

Pos.	Rider	Points
1	(Australia) Remy Gardner	184
2	(Spain) Raúl Fernández	153
3	(Italy) Marco Bezzecchi	128
4	(United Kingdom) Sam Lowes	99
5	(Italy) Fabio Di Giannantonio	73

Constructors' Championship standings

Pos.	Constructor	Points
1	(Germany) Kalex	225
2	(Italy) Boscoscuro	81
3	(Italy) MV Agusta	10
4	(Japan) NTS	10

Teams' Championship standings

Pos.	Team	Points
1	(Finland) Red Bull KTM Ajo	337
2	(Italy) Sky Racing Team VR46	150
3	(Belgium) Elf Marc VDS Racing Team	149
4	(Germany) Liqui Moly Intact GP	96
5	(Italy) Federal Oil Gresini Moto2	83

=== Moto3 ===
Riders' Championship standings

	Pos.	Rider	Points
	1	(Spain) Pedro Acosta	158
	2	(Spain) Sergio García	110
3	3	(Italy) Dennis Foggia	86
1	4	(Italy) Romano Fenati	80
2	5	(Spain) Jaume Masiá	72

Constructors' Championship standings

Pos.	Constructor	Points
1	(Austria) KTM	190
2	(Japan) Honda	178
3	(Spain) Gas Gas	122
4	(Sweden) Husqvarna	84

Teams' Championship standings

	Pos.	Team	Points
	1	(Finland) Red Bull KTM Ajo	230
	2	(Spain) Gaviota GasGas Aspar Team	146
	3	(Italy) Indonesian Racing Gresini Moto3	117
3	4	(Luxembourg) Leopard Racing	116
	5	(Malaysia) Petronas Sprinta Racing	106

=== MotoE ===
	Pos.	Rider	Points
	1	(Italy) Alessandro Zaccone	70
1	2	(Spain) Jordi Torres	63
3	3	(Brazil) Eric Granado	53
2	4	(Switzerland) Dominique Aegerter	53
	5	(Italy) Mattia Casadei	43

== Notes ==
Previous race: 2021 German Grand Prix	FIM Grand Prix World Championship; 2021 season	Next race: 2021 Styrian Grand Prix
Previous race: 2019 Dutch TT	Dutch TT	Next race: 2022 Dutch TT
