= 2021 San Marino and Rimini Riviera motorcycle Grand Prix =

Fourteenth round of the 2021 Grand Prix motorcycle racing season

2021 San Marino and Rimini Riviera Grand Prix
Race details
- Race 14 of 18 races in the 2021 Grand Prix motorcycle racing season
- Date: 19 September 2021
- Official name: Gran Premio Octo di San Marino e della Riviera di Rimini
- Location: Misano World Circuit Marco Simoncelli; Misano Adriatico, Province of Rimini, Italy
- Course: Permanent racing facility; 4.226 km (2.626 mi)

MotoGP
Pole position
Rider	(Italy) Francesco Bagnaia	Ducati
Time	1:31.065	
Fastest lap
Rider	(Italy) Enea Bastianini	Ducati
Time	1:32.242 on lap 17	
Podium
First	(Italy) Francesco Bagnaia	Ducati
Second	(France) Fabio Quartararo	Yamaha
Third	(Italy) Enea Bastianini	Ducati

Moto2
Pole position
Rider	(Spain) Raúl Fernández	Kalex
Time	1:36.264	
Fastest lap
Rider	(Spain) Raúl Fernández	Kalex
Time	1:36.938 on lap 19	
Podium
First	(Spain) Raúl Fernández	Kalex
Second	(Australia) Remy Gardner	Kalex
Third	(Spain) Arón Canet	Boscoscuro

Moto3
Pole position
Rider	(Italy) Romano Fenati	Husqvarna
Time	1:41.756	
Fastest lap
Rider	(Italy) Romano Fenati	Husqvarna
Time	1:41.648 on lap 5	
Podium
First	(Italy) Dennis Foggia	Honda
Second	(Italy) Niccolò Antonelli	KTM
Third	(Italy) Andrea Migno	Honda

MotoE Race 1
Pole position
Rider	(Spain) Jordi Torres	Energica
Time	1:43.265	
Fastest lap
Rider	(Italy) Kevin Zannoni	Energica
Time	1:43.081 on lap 6	
Podium
First	(Spain) Jordi Torres	Energica
Second	(Switzerland) Dominique Aegerter	Energica
Third	(Italy) Mattia Casadei	Energica

MotoE Race 2
Pole position
Rider	(Spain) Jordi Torres	Energica
Time	1:43.265	
Fastest lap
Rider	(Switzerland) Dominique Aegerter	Energica
Time	1:42.660 on lap 5	
Podium
First	(Italy) Matteo Ferrari	Energica
Second	(Italy) Mattia Casadei	Energica
Third	(Spain) Miquel Pons	Energica

The 2021 San Marino and Rimini Riviera motorcycle Grand Prix (officially known as the Gran Premio Octo di San Marino e della Riviera di Rimini) was the fourteenth round of the 2021 Grand Prix motorcycle racing season and the sixth round of the 2021 MotoE World Cup, which represented the end of the season for the MotoE class. It was held at the Misano World Circuit Marco Simoncelli in Misano Adriatico on 19 September 2021.

In this race, the Sky VR46 Team showed off a special fuchsia colored livery.

== Qualifying ==
=== MotoGP ===
Fastest session lap

Pos.	No.	Biker	Constructor	Qualifying times		Final grid	Row
Pos.	No.	Biker	Constructor	Q1	Q2	Final grid	Row
1	63	(Italy) Francesco Bagnaia	Ducati	Qualified in Q2	1:31.065	1	1
2	43	(Australia) Jack Miller	Ducati	Qualified in Q2	1:31.314	2	1
3	20	(France) Fabio Quartararo	Yamaha	Qualified in Q2	1:31.367	3	1
4	89	(Spain) Jorge Martín	Ducati	Qualified in Q2	1:31.663	4	2
5	5	(France) Johann Zarco	Ducati	Qualified in Q2	1:31.836	5	2
6	44	(Spain) Pol Espargaró	Honda	Qualified in Q2	1:31.923	6	2
7	93	(Spain) Marc Márquez	Honda	1:32.029	1:31.935	7	3
8	41	(Spain) Aleix Espargaró	Aprilia	Qualified in Q2	1:31.937	8	3
9	42	(Spain) Álex Rins	Suzuki	Qualified in Q2	1:32.017	9	3
10	12	(Spain) Maverick Viñales	Aprilia	Qualified in Q2	1:32.121	10	4
11	36	(Spain) Joan Mir	Suzuki	Qualified in Q2	1:32.426	11	4
12	23	(Italy) Enea Bastianini	Ducati	1:31.876	1:32.461	12	4
13	30	(Japan) Takaaki Nakagami	Honda	1:32.210	N/A	13	5
14	51	(Italy) Michele Pirro	Ducati	1:32.287	N/A	14	5
15	10	(Italy) Luca Marini	Ducati	1:32.289	N/A	15	5
16	21	(Italy) Franco Morbidelli	Yamaha	1:32.296	N/A	16	6
17	33	(South Africa) Brad Binder	KTM	1:32.427	N/A	17	6
18	6	(Germany) Stefan Bradl	Honda	1:32.439	N/A	18	6
19	73	(Spain) Álex Márquez	Honda	1:32.476	N/A	19	7
20	27	(Spain) Iker Lecuona	KTM	1:32.481	N/A	20	7
21	88	(Portugal) Miguel Oliveira	KTM	1:32.821	N/A	21	7
22	9	(Italy) Danilo Petrucci	KTM	1:32.891	N/A	22	8
23	46	(Italy) Valentino Rossi	Yamaha	1:32.967	N/A	23	8
24	4	(Italy) Andrea Dovizioso	Yamaha	1:33.098	N/A	24	8
OFFICIAL MOTOGP QUALIFYING RESULTS

== Race ==
=== MotoGP ===
Pos.	No.	Rider	Team	Manufacturer	Laps	Time/Retired	Grid	Points
1	63	(Italy) Francesco Bagnaia	Ducati Lenovo Team	Ducati	27	41:48.305	1	25
2	20	(France) Fabio Quartararo	Monster Energy Yamaha MotoGP	Yamaha	27	+0.364	3	20
3	23	(Italy) Enea Bastianini	Avintia Esponsorama	Ducati	27	+4.789	12	16
4	93	(Spain) Marc Márquez	Repsol Honda Team	Honda	27	+10.245	7	13
5	43	(Australia) Jack Miller	Ducati Lenovo Team	Ducati	27	+10.469	2	11
6 (Note: 1-position penalty for exceeding track limits on the last lap.)	36	(Spain) Joan Mir	Team Suzuki Ecstar	Suzuki	27	+10.325	11	10
7	44	(Spain) Pol Espargaró	Repsol Honda Team	Honda	27	+13.234	6	9
8	41	(Spain) Aleix Espargaró	Aprilia Racing Team Gresini	Aprilia	27	+15.698	8	8
9	33	(South Africa) Brad Binder	Red Bull KTM Factory Racing	KTM	27	+16.129	17	7
10	30	(Japan) Takaaki Nakagami	LCR Honda Idemitsu	Honda	27	+18.519	13	6
11	51	(Italy) Michele Pirro	Ducati Lenovo Team	Ducati	27	+20.373	14	5
12	5	(France) Johann Zarco	Pramac Racing	Ducati	27	+21.066	5	4
13	12	(Spain) Maverick Viñales	Aprilia Racing Team Gresini	Aprilia	27	+21.258	10	3
14	6	(Germany) Stefan Bradl	Team Honda HRC	Honda	27	+28.142	18	2
15	73	(Spain) Álex Márquez	LCR Honda Castrol	Honda	27	+30.686	19	1
16	9	(Italy) Danilo Petrucci	Tech3 KTM Factory Racing	KTM	27	+32.654	22	
17	46	(Italy) Valentino Rossi	Petronas Yamaha SRT	Yamaha	27	+33.853	23	
18	21	(Italy) Franco Morbidelli	Monster Energy Yamaha MotoGP	Yamaha	27	+36.272	16	
19	10	(Italy) Luca Marini	Sky VR46 Avintia	Ducati	27	+36.839	15	
20	88	(Portugal) Miguel Oliveira	Red Bull KTM Factory Racing	KTM	27	+37.202	21	
21	04	(Italy) Andrea Dovizioso	Petronas Yamaha SRT	Yamaha	27	+42.587	24	
Ret	42	(Spain) Álex Rins	Team Suzuki Ecstar	Suzuki	17	Accident	9	
Ret	27	(Spain) Iker Lecuona	Tech3 KTM Factory Racing	KTM	14	Accident	20	
Ret	89	(Spain) Jorge Martín	Pramac Racing	Ducati	10	Accident Damage	4	
Fastest lap: (Italy) Enea Bastianini (Ducati) – 1:32.242 (lap 17)

=== Moto2 ===
Pos.	No.	Rider	Manufacturer	Laps	Time/Retired	Grid	Points
1	25	(Spain) Raúl Fernández	Kalex	25	40:40.563	1	25
2	87	(Australia) Remy Gardner	Kalex	25	+0.402	4	20
3	44	(Spain) Arón Canet	Boscoscuro	25	+0.569	5	16
4	22	(United Kingdom) Sam Lowes	Kalex	25	+1.578	2	13
5	72	(Italy) Marco Bezzecchi	Kalex	25	+4.920	8	11
6	37	(Spain) Augusto Fernández	Kalex	25	+5.361	3	10
7	79	(Japan) Ai Ogura	Kalex	25	+6.236	12	9
8	97	(Spain) Xavi Vierge	Kalex	25	+7.468	7	8
9	21	(Italy) Fabio Di Giannantonio	Kalex	25	+7.562	9	7
10	13	(Italy) Celestino Vietti	Kalex	25	+13.230	17	6
11	12	(Switzerland) Thomas Lüthi	Kalex	25	+15.596	14	5
12	23	(Germany) Marcel Schrötter	Kalex	25	+16.172	13	4
13	9	(Spain) Jorge Navarro	Boscoscuro	25	+20.234	6	3
14	42	(Spain) Marcos Ramírez	Kalex	25	+22.819	23	2
15	14	(Italy) Tony Arbolino	Kalex	25	+23.015	22	1
16	62	(Italy) Stefano Manzi	Kalex	25	+26.152	16	
17	11	(Italy) Nicolò Bulega	Kalex	25	+26.987	11	
18	55	(Malaysia) Hafizh Syahrin	NTS	25	+27.231	19	
19	96	(United Kingdom) Jake Dixon	Kalex	25	+28.150	20	
20	40	(Spain) Héctor Garzó	Kalex	25	+28.526	21	
21	6	(United States) Cameron Beaubier	Kalex	25	+29.864	28	
22	75	(Spain) Albert Arenas	Boscoscuro	25	+33.140	26	
23	16	(United States) Joe Roberts	Kalex	25	+36.098	15	
24	7	(Italy) Lorenzo Baldassarri	MV Agusta	25	+43.861	29	
25	64	(Netherlands) Bo Bendsneyder	Kalex	25	+47.329	27	
Ret	35	(Thailand) Somkiat Chantra	Kalex	22	Accident	18	
Ret	19	(Italy) Lorenzo Dalla Porta	Kalex	19	Accident	10	
Ret	70	(Belgium) Barry Baltus	NTS	12	Accident	30	
Ret	5	(Italy) Yari Montella	Boscoscuro	12	Accident	24	
Ret	24	(Italy) Simone Corsi	MV Agusta	2	Accident	25	
OFFICIAL MOTO2 RACE REPORT

=== Moto3 ===
Pos.	No.	Rider	Manufacturer	Laps	Time/Retired	Grid	Points
1	7	(Italy) Dennis Foggia	Honda	23	39:17.002	2	25
2	23	(Italy) Niccolò Antonelli	KTM	23	+0.565	3	20
3	16	(Italy) Andrea Migno	Honda	23	+0.817	4	16
4	11	(Spain) Sergio García	Gas Gas	23	+2.140	12	13
5	5	(Spain) Jaume Masiá	KTM	23	+3.098	5	11
6	40	(South Africa) Darryn Binder	Honda	23	+7.633	14	10
7	37	(Spain) Pedro Acosta	KTM	23	+9.991	9	9
8	99	(Spain) Carlos Tatay	KTM	23	+10.184	10	8
9	82	(Italy) Stefano Nepa	KTM	23	+10.341	11	7
10	71	(Japan) Ayumu Sasaki	KTM	23	+10.344	13	6
11	54	(Italy) Riccardo Rossi	KTM	23	+10.360	7	5
12	28	(Spain) Izan Guevara	Gas Gas	23	+14.626	17	4
13	17	(United Kingdom) John McPhee	Honda	23	+14.898	19	3
14	27	(Japan) Kaito Toba	KTM	23	+15.019	18	2
15	24	(Japan) Tatsuki Suzuki	Honda	23	+15.072	27	1
16	52	(Spain) Jeremy Alcoba	Honda	23	+18.859	24	
17	6	(Japan) Ryusei Yamanaka	KTM	23	+18.874	16	
18	18	(Italy) Matteo Bertelle	KTM	23	+18.921	15	
19	20	(France) Lorenzo Fellon	Honda	23	+19.303	23	
20	31	(Spain) Adrián Fernández	Husqvarna	23	+21.363	21	
21	53	(Turkey) Deniz Öncü	KTM	23	+26.962	26	
22	73	(Austria) Maximilian Kofler	KTM	23	+30.466	22	
23	67	(Italy) Alberto Surra	Honda	23	+46.656	28	
24	19	(Indonesia) Andi Farid Izdihar	Honda	23	+53.470	20	
Ret	12	(Czech Republic) Filip Salač	KTM	17	Wheel Fork	25	
Ret	43	(Spain) Xavier Artigas	Honda	14	Rider In Pain	6	
Ret	55	(Italy) Romano Fenati	Husqvarna	13	Accident	1	
Ret	22	(Italy) Elia Bartolini	KTM	1	Accident	8	
DNS	2	(Argentina) Gabriel Rodrigo	Honda		Did not start		
EX	92	(Japan) Yuki Kunii	Honda		Excluded		
OFFICIAL MOTO3 RACE REPORT

- Gabriel Rodrigo withdrew from the event due to a broken left humerus suffered at the Aragon Grand Prix.
- Yuki Kunii was excluded from the event due to causing a collision with Alberto Surra in third free practice.

=== MotoE ===
==== Race 1 ====
Pos.	No.	Rider	Laps	Time/Retired	Grid	Points
1	40	(Spain) Jordi Torres	7	12:11.858	1	25
2	77	(Switzerland) Dominique Aegerter	7	+0.160	5	20
3	27	(Italy) Mattia Casadei	7	+0.405	4	16
4	11	(Italy) Matteo Ferrari	7	+2.786	6	13
5	71	(Spain) Miquel Pons	7	+3.072	8	11
6	21	(Italy) Kevin Zannoni	7	+3.095	9	10
7	54	(Spain) Fermín Aldeguer	7	+3.621	7	9
8	3	(Germany) Lukas Tulovic	7	+10.598	10	8
9	68	(Colombia) Yonny Hernández	7	+10.482	11	7
10	18	(Andorra) Xavi Cardelús	7	+10.905	13	6
11	9	(Italy) Andrea Mantovani	7	+11.088	14	5
12	19	(France) Corentin Perolari	7	+16.045	15	4
13	6	(Spain) María Herrera	7	+17.087	16	3
14	80	(Netherlands) Jasper Iwema	7	+25.402	17	2
15	14	(Portugal) André Pires	7	+32.416	18	1
Ret	51	(Brazil) Eric Granado	6	Accident	2	
Ret	61	(Italy) Alessandro Zaccone	0	Accident	3	
Ret	78	(Japan) Hikari Okubo	0	Accident	12	
OFFICIAL MOTOE RACE 1 REPORT

- All bikes manufactured by Energica.

==== Race 2 ====
Pos.	No.	Rider	Laps	Time/Retired	Grid	Points
1	11	(Italy) Matteo Ferrari	8	13:54.140	5	25
2	27	(Italy) Mattia Casadei	8	+0.348	3	20
3	71	(Spain) Miquel Pons	8	+1.038	7	16
4	21	(Italy) Kevin Zannoni	8	+3.402	8	13
5	51	(Brazil) Eric Granado	8	+3.484	2	11
6	78	(Japan) Hikari Okubo	8	+3.899	11	10
7	54	(Spain) Fermín Aldeguer	8	+7.274	6	9
8	18	(Andorra) Xavi Cardelús	8	+11.109	12	8
9	9	(Italy) Andrea Mantovani	8	+10.779	13	7
10	19	(France) Corentin Perolari	8	+15.250	14	6
11	6	(Spain) María Herrera	8	+15.428	15	5
12	77	(Switzerland) Dominique Aegerter	8	+37.830 (Note: 38-second penalty for failing to serve a ride through penalty.)	4	4
13	40	(Spain) Jordi Torres	8	+45.570	1	3
14	80	(Netherlands) Jasper Iwema	8	+46.449	16	2
15	3	(Germany) Lukas Tulovic	8	+56.267	9	1
Ret	68	(Colombia) Yonny Hernández	4	Accident	10	
DNS	61	(Italy) Alessandro Zaccone		Did not start		
DNS	14	(Portugal) André Pires		Did not start		
OFFICIAL MOTOE RACE 2 REPORT

- Alessandro Zaccone suffered a pelvis fracture during race 1 and was declared unfit for race 2.
- André Pires was declared unfit for race 2 due to a shoulder injury.
- All bikes manufactured by Energica.

== Championship standings after the race ==
Below are the standings for the top five riders, constructors, and teams after the round.

=== MotoGP ===
Riders' Championship standings

Pos.	Rider	Points
1	(France) Fabio Quartararo	234
2	(Italy) Francesco Bagnaia	186
3	(Spain) Joan Mir	167
4	(France) Johann Zarco	141
5	(Australia) Jack Miller	140

Constructors' Championship standings

Pos.	Constructor	Points
1	(Italy) Ducati	275
2	(Japan) Yamaha	262
3	(Japan) Suzuki	184
4	(Austria) KTM	178
5	(Japan) Honda	148

Teams' Championship standings

Pos.	Team	Points
1	(Japan) Monster Energy Yamaha MotoGP	329
2	(Italy) Ducati Lenovo Team	326
3	(Japan) Team Suzuki Ecstar	235
4	(Italy) Pramac Racing	216
5	(Austria) Red Bull KTM Factory Racing	211

=== Moto2 ===
Riders' Championship standings

	Pos.	Rider	Points
	1	(Australia) Remy Gardner	271
	2	(Spain) Raúl Fernández	237
	3	(Italy) Marco Bezzecchi	190
	4	(United Kingdom) Sam Lowes	140
1	5	(Spain) Arón Canet	119

Constructors' Championship standings

Pos.	Constructor	Points
1	(Germany) Kalex	350
2	(Italy) Boscoscuro	154
3	(Italy) MV Agusta	16
4	(Japan) NTS	10

Teams' Championship standings

	Pos.	Team	Points
	1	(Finland) Red Bull KTM Ajo	508
	2	(Belgium) Elf Marc VDS Racing Team	258
	3	(Italy) Sky Racing Team VR46	243
1	4	(Spain) Inde Aspar Team	142
1	5	(Japan) Idemitsu Honda Team Asia	139

=== Moto3 ===
Riders' Championship standings

	Pos.	Rider	Points
	1	(Spain) Pedro Acosta	210
1	2	(Italy) Dennis Foggia	168
1	3	(Spain) Sergio García	168
	4	(Italy) Romano Fenati	134
	5	(Spain) Jaume Masiá	122

Constructors' Championship standings

Pos.	Constructor	Points
1	(Austria) KTM	295
2	(Japan) Honda	270
3	(Spain) Gas Gas	206
4	(Sweden) Husqvarna	140

Teams' Championship standings

	Pos.	Team	Points
	1	(Finland) Red Bull KTM Ajo	332
	2	(Spain) Gaviota GasGas Aspar Team	244
	3	(Luxembourg) Leopard Racing	198
1	4	(Malaysia) Petronas Sprinta Racing	173
1	5	(France) Red Bull KTM Tech3	166

=== MotoE ===
	Pos.	Rider	Points
2	1	(Spain) Jordi Torres	100
2	2	(Switzerland) Dominique Aegerter	93
3	3	(Italy) Matteo Ferrari	86
2	4	(Brazil) Eric Granado	84
4	5	(Italy) Alessandro Zaccone	80

== Notes ==
Previous race: 2021 Aragon Grand Prix	FIM Grand Prix World Championship; 2021 season	Next race: 2021 Grand Prix of the Americas
Previous race: 2020 San Marino Grand Prix	San Marino and Rimini Riviera motorcycle Grand Prix	Next race: 2022 San Marino Grand Prix
