= 2021 Catalan motorcycle Grand Prix =

Seventh round of the 2021 Grand Prix motorcycle racing season

(Catalonia) 2021 Catalan Grand Prix
Race details
- Race 7 of 18 races in the 2021 Grand Prix motorcycle racing season
- Date: 6 June 2021
- Official name: Gran Premi Monster Energy de Catalunya
- Location: Circuit de Barcelona-Catalunya; Montmeló, Spain
- Course: Permanent racing facility; 4.657 km (2.894 mi)

MotoGP
Pole position
Rider	(France) Fabio Quartararo	Yamaha
Time	1:38.853	
Fastest lap
Rider	(France) Johann Zarco	Ducati
Time	1:39.939 on lap 8	
Podium
First	(Portugal) Miguel Oliveira	KTM
Second	(France) Johann Zarco	Ducati
Third	(Australia) Jack Miller	Ducati

Moto2
Pole position
Rider	(Australia) Remy Gardner	Kalex
Time	1:42.977	
Fastest lap
Rider	(Spain) Raúl Fernández	Kalex
Time	1:43.757 on lap 2	
Podium
First	(Australia) Remy Gardner	Kalex
Second	(Spain) Raúl Fernández	Kalex
Third	(Spain) Xavi Vierge	Kalex

Moto3
Pole position
Rider	(Argentina) Gabriel Rodrigo	Honda
Time	1:47.597	
Fastest lap
Rider	(South Africa) Darryn Binder	Honda
Time	1:48.209 on lap 5	
Podium
First	(Spain) Sergio García	Gas Gas
Second	(Spain) Jeremy Alcoba	Honda
Third	(Turkey) Deniz Öncü	KTM

MotoE
Pole position
Rider	(Brazil) Eric Granado	Energica
Time	1:50.446	
Fastest lap
Rider	(Brazil) Eric Granado	Energica
Time	1:50.769 on lap 4	
Podium
First	(Spain) Miquel Pons	Energica
Second	(Switzerland) Dominique Aegerter	Energica
Third	(Spain) Jordi Torres	Energica

The 2021 Catalan motorcycle Grand Prix (officially known as the Gran Premi Monster Energy de Catalunya) was the seventh round of the 2021 Grand Prix motorcycle racing season and the third round of the 2021 MotoE World Cup. It was held at the Circuit de Barcelona-Catalunya in Montmeló on 6 June 2021.

== Qualifying ==
=== MotoGP ===
Fastest session lap

Pos.	No.	Biker	Constructor	Qualifying times		Final grid	Row
Pos.	No.	Biker	Constructor	Q1	Q2	Final grid	Row
1	20	(France) Fabio Quartararo	Yamaha	Qualified in Q2	1:38.853	1	1
2	43	(Australia) Jack Miller	Ducati	1:39.153	1:38.890	2	1
3	5	(France) Johann Zarco	Ducati	Qualified in Q2	1:39.049	3	1
4	88	(Portugal) Miguel Oliveira	KTM	Qualified in Q2	1:39.099	4	2
5	21	(Italy) Franco Morbidelli	Yamaha	Qualified in Q2	1:39.109	5	2
6	12	(Spain) Maverick Viñales	Yamaha	Qualified in Q2	1:39.157	6	2
7	41	(Spain) Aleix Espargaró	Aprilia	Qualified in Q2	1:39.218	7	3
8	33	(South Africa) Brad Binder	KTM	Qualified in Q2	1:39.343	8	3
9	63	(Italy) Francesco Bagnaia	Ducati	Qualified in Q2	1:39.359	9	3
10	36	(Spain) Joan Mir	Suzuki	Qualified in Q2	1:39.431	10	4
11	46	(Italy) Valentino Rossi	Yamaha	Qualified in Q2	1:39.605	11	4
12	44	(Spain) Pol Espargaró	Honda	1:39.170	1:41.791	12	4
13	93	(Spain) Marc Márquez	Honda	1:39.181	N/A	13	5
14	30	(Japan) Takaaki Nakagami	Honda	1:39.347	N/A	14	5
15	89	(Spain) Jorge Martín	Ducati	1:39.532	N/A	15	5
16	27	(Spain) Iker Lecuona	KTM	1:39.567	N/A	16	6
17	23	(Italy) Enea Bastianini	Ducati	1:39.590	N/A	17	6
18	9	(Italy) Danilo Petrucci	KTM	1:39.744	N/A	18	6
19	10	(Italy) Luca Marini	Ducati	1:39.942	N/A	19	7
20	73	(Spain) Álex Márquez	Honda	1:40.009	N/A	20	7
21	32	(Italy) Lorenzo Savadori	Aprilia	1:40.158	N/A	21	7
OFFICIAL MOTOGP QUALIFYING RESULTS

== Race ==
=== MotoGP ===
Pos.	No.	Rider	Team	Manufacturer	Laps	Time/Retired	Grid	Points
1	88	(Portugal) Miguel Oliveira	Red Bull KTM Factory Racing	KTM	24	40:21.749	4	25
2	5	(France) Johann Zarco	Pramac Racing	Ducati	24	+0.175	3	20
3	43	(Australia) Jack Miller	Ducati Lenovo Team	Ducati	24	+1.990	2	16
4	36	(Spain) Joan Mir	Team Suzuki Ecstar	Suzuki	24	+5.325	10	13
5	12	(Spain) Maverick Viñales	Monster Energy Yamaha MotoGP	Yamaha	24	+6.281	6	11
6	20	(France) Fabio Quartararo	Monster Energy Yamaha MotoGP	Yamaha	24	+7.815 (Note: 3-second penalty for gaining an advantage shortcutting the track at turns 1–2; 3-second penalty for riding with an open leather suit and without chest protector.)	1	10
7	63	(Italy) Francesco Bagnaia	Ducati Lenovo Team	Ducati	24	+8.175	9	9
8	33	(South Africa) Brad Binder	Red Bull KTM Factory Racing	KTM	24	+8.378	8	8
9	21	(Italy) Franco Morbidelli	Petronas Yamaha SRT	Yamaha	24	+15.652	5	7
10	23	(Italy) Enea Bastianini	Avintia Esponsorama	Ducati	24	+19.297	17	6
11	73	(Spain) Álex Márquez	LCR Honda Castrol	Honda	24	+21.650	20	5
12	10	(Italy) Luca Marini	Sky VR46 Avintia	Ducati	24	+22.533	19	4
13	30	(Japan) Takaaki Nakagami	LCR Honda Idemitsu	Honda	24	+27.833	14	3
14	89	(Spain) Jorge Martín	Pramac Racing	Ducati	24	+29.075	15	2
15	32	(Italy) Lorenzo Savadori	Aprilia Racing Team Gresini	Aprilia	24	+40.291	21	1
Ret	27	(Spain) Iker Lecuona	Tech3 KTM Factory Racing	KTM	16	Accident	16	
Ret	46	(Italy) Valentino Rossi	Petronas Yamaha SRT	Yamaha	15	Accident	11	
Ret	41	(Spain) Aleix Espargaró	Aprilia Racing Team Gresini	Aprilia	10	Accident	7	
Ret	93	(Spain) Marc Márquez	Repsol Honda Team	Honda	7	Accident	13	
Ret	9	(Italy) Danilo Petrucci	Tech3 KTM Factory Racing	KTM	5	Accident	18	
Ret	44	(Spain) Pol Espargaró	Repsol Honda Team	Honda	4	Accident	12	
Fastest lap: (France) Johann Zarco (Ducati) – 1:39.939 (lap 8)

=== Moto2 ===
Pos.	No.	Rider	Manufacturer	Laps	Time/Retired	Grid	Points
1	87	(Australia) Remy Gardner	Kalex	22	38:22.284	1	25
2	25	(Spain) Raúl Fernández	Kalex	22	+1.872	2	20
3	97	(Spain) Xavi Vierge	Kalex	22	+2.866	6	16
4	72	(Italy) Marco Bezzecchi	Kalex	22	+3.207	10	13
5	37	(Spain) Augusto Fernández	Kalex	22	+3.899	4	11
6	64	(Netherlands) Bo Bendsneyder	Kalex	22	+4.541	3	10
7	22	(United Kingdom) Sam Lowes	Kalex	22	+4.875	8	9
8	23	(Germany) Marcel Schrötter	Kalex	22	+15.973	13	8
9	35	(Thailand) Somkiat Chantra	Kalex	22	+17.515	9	7
10	16	(United States) Joe Roberts	Kalex	22	+19.838	17	6
11	9	(Spain) Jorge Navarro	Boscoscuro	22	+20.571	12	5
12	75	(Spain) Albert Arenas	Boscoscuro	22	+22.512	21	4
13	14	(Italy) Tony Arbolino	Kalex	22	+22.558	14	3
14	13	(Italy) Celestino Vietti	Kalex	22	+23.238	25	2
15	12	(Switzerland) Thomas Lüthi	Kalex	22	+23.958	23	1
16	24	(Italy) Simone Corsi	MV Agusta	22	+25.099	22	
17	11	(Italy) Nicolò Bulega	Kalex	22	+31.344	16	
18	96	(United Kingdom) Jake Dixon	Kalex	22	+37.129	32	
19	6	(United States) Cameron Beaubier	Kalex	22	+37.895	28	
20	55	(Malaysia) Hafizh Syahrin	NTS	22	+38.438	20	
21	2	(Spain) Alonso López	Boscoscuro	22	+40.247	29	
22	70	(Belgium) Barry Baltus	NTS	22	+40.674	26	
23	7	(Italy) Lorenzo Baldassarri	MV Agusta	22	+40.784	24	
24	62	(Italy) Stefano Manzi	Kalex	22	+48.588	27	
25	74	(Poland) Piotr Biesiekirski	Kalex	22	+49.640	31	
26	81	(Thailand) Keminth Kubo	Kalex	22	+49.694	30	
Ret	40	(Spain) Héctor Garzó	Kalex	20	Accident	19	
Ret	21	(Italy) Fabio Di Giannantonio	Kalex	20	Accident	5	
Ret	79	(Japan) Ai Ogura	Kalex	19	Accident	7	
Ret	19	(Italy) Lorenzo Dalla Porta	Kalex	18	Accident	15	
Ret	42	(Spain) Marcos Ramírez	Kalex	7	Accident	18	
Ret	44	(Spain) Arón Canet	Boscoscuro	6	Accident	11	
OFFICIAL MOTO2 RACE REPORT

=== Moto3 ===
The race was red-flagged due to an accident involving Xavier Artigas, Dennis Foggia and Ayumu Sasaki after the first eleven riders had already taken the chequered flag; the riders who were actively competing were classified according to their last full lap—the last one for the leading group and the penultimate one for the remaining seven riders.

Pos.	No.	Rider	Manufacturer	Laps	Time/Retired	Grid	Points
1	11	(Spain) Sergio García	Gas Gas	21	38:33.760	19	25
2	52	(Spain) Jeremy Alcoba	Honda	21	+0.015	2	20
3	53	(Turkey) Deniz Öncü	KTM	21	+0.118	12	16
4 (Note: 1-position penalty for exceeding track limits on the last lap.)	5	(Spain) Jaume Masiá	KTM	21	+0.079	9	13
5	40	(South Africa) Darryn Binder	Honda	21	+0.204	7	11
6	2	(Argentina) Gabriel Rodrigo	Honda	21	+0.317	1	10
7	37	(Spain) Pedro Acosta	KTM	21	+0.380	25	9
8	23	(Italy) Niccolò Antonelli	KTM	21	+0.798	3	8
9	27	(Japan) Kaito Toba	KTM	21	+0.933	13	7
10	82	(Italy) Stefano Nepa	KTM	21	+0.983	4	6
11	55	(Italy) Romano Fenati	Husqvarna	21	+3.334	11	5
12	92	(Japan) Yuki Kunii	Honda	20	+1 lap	20	4
13	22	(Italy) Elia Bartolini	KTM	20	+1 lap	28	3
14	6	(Japan) Ryusei Yamanaka	KTM	20	+1 lap	22	2
15	96	(Spain) Daniel Holgado	KTM	20	+1 lap	23	1
16	20	(France) Lorenzo Fellon	Honda	20	+1 lap	24	
17	19	(Indonesia) Andi Farid Izdihar	Honda	20	+1 lap	26	
18	32	(Japan) Takuma Matsuyama	Honda	20	+1 lap	27	
Ret	28	(Spain) Izan Guevara	Gas Gas	20	Accident	5	
Ret	71	(Japan) Ayumu Sasaki	KTM	20	Accident	14	
Ret	7	(Italy) Dennis Foggia	Honda	20	Accident	16	
Ret	43	(Spain) Xavier Artigas	Honda	20	Accident	18	
Ret	12	(Czech Republic) Filip Salač	Honda	15	Clutch	17	
Ret	31	(Spain) Adrián Fernández	Husqvarna	11	Handling	15	
Ret	17	(United Kingdom) John McPhee	Honda	9	Accident	6	
Ret	16	(Italy) Andrea Migno	Honda	9	Accident	21	
Ret	24	(Japan) Tatsuki Suzuki	Honda	9	Accident	8	
DNS	54	(Italy) Riccardo Rossi	KTM	0	Did not start	10	
OFFICIAL MOTO3 RACE REPORT

- Riccardo Rossi crashed on the warm-up lap and failed to start the race.

=== MotoE ===
Pos.	No.	Rider	Laps	Time/Retired	Grid	Points
1	71	(Spain) Miquel Pons	6	11:15.075	4	25
2	77	(Switzerland) Dominique Aegerter	6	+0.531	3	20
3	40	(Spain) Jordi Torres	6	+0.577	2	16
4	61	(Italy) Alessandro Zaccone	6	+1.121	6	13
5	68	(Colombia) Yonny Hernández	6	+1.151	12	11
6	54	(Spain) Fermín Aldeguer	6	+1.790	7	10
7	11	(Italy) Matteo Ferrari	6	+1.764	9	9
8	3	(Germany) Lukas Tulovic	6	+2.352	5	8
9	78	(Japan) Hikari Okubo	6	+3.214	11	7
10	19	(France) Corentin Perolari	6	+5.160	13	6
11	6	(Spain) María Herrera	6	+5.394	15	5
12	21	(Italy) Kevin Zannoni	6	+12.150	17	4
13	14	(Portugal) André Pires	6	+24.162	18	3
14	9	(Italy) Andrea Mantovani	6	+1:39.276	14	2
Ret	51	(Brazil) Eric Granado	5	Accident	1	
Ret	27	(Italy) Mattia Casadei	4	Accident	8	
Ret	80	(Netherlands) Jasper Iwema	1	Accident	16	
Ret	18	(Andorra) Xavi Cardelús	0	Accident	10	
OFFICIAL MOTOE RACE REPORT

- All bikes manufactured by Energica.

== Championship standings after the race ==
Below are the standings for the top five riders, constructors, and teams after the round.

=== MotoGP ===
Riders' Championship standings

	Pos.	Rider	Points
	1	(France) Fabio Quartararo	115
	2	(France) Johann Zarco	101
1	3	(Australia) Jack Miller	90
1	4	(Italy) Francesco Bagnaia	88
	5	(Spain) Joan Mir	78

Constructors' Championship standings

	Pos.	Constructor	Points
	1	(Japan) Yamaha	143
	2	(Italy) Ducati	143
1	3	(Austria) KTM	83
1	4	(Japan) Suzuki	82
	5	(Japan) Honda	52

Teams' Championship standings

Pos.	Team	Points
1	(Japan) Monster Energy Yamaha MotoGP	190
2	(Italy) Ducati Lenovo Team	178
3	(Italy) Pramac Racing	124
4	(Japan) Team Suzuki Ecstar	101
5	(Austria) Red Bull KTM Factory Racing	97

=== Moto2 ===
Riders' Championship standings

Pos.	Rider	Points
1	(Australia) Remy Gardner	139
2	(Spain) Raúl Fernández	128
3	(Italy) Marco Bezzecchi	101
4	(United Kingdom) Sam Lowes	75
5	(Italy) Fabio Di Giannantonio	60

Constructors' Championship standings

Pos.	Constructor	Points
1	(Germany) Kalex	175
2	(Italy) Boscoscuro	52
3	(Italy) MV Agusta	10
4	(Japan) NTS	8

Teams' Championship standings

Pos.	Team	Points
1	(Finland) Red Bull KTM Ajo	267
2	(Italy) Sky Racing Team VR46	116
3	(Belgium) Elf Marc VDS Racing Team	109
4	(Germany) Liqui Moly Intact GP	79
5	(Italy) Federal Oil Gresini Moto2	65

=== Moto3 ===
Riders' Championship standings

	Pos.	Rider	Points
	1	(Spain) Pedro Acosta	120
2	2	(Spain) Sergio García	81
1	3	(Spain) Jaume Masiá	72
1	4	(Italy) Romano Fenati	61
1	5	(South Africa) Darryn Binder	58

Constructors' Championship standings

Pos.	Constructor	Points
1	(Austria) KTM	152
2	(Japan) Honda	137
3	(Spain) Gas Gas	93
4	(Sweden) Husqvarna	65

Teams' Championship standings

	Pos.	Team	Points
	1	(Finland) Red Bull KTM Ajo	192
	2	(Spain) Solunion GasGas Aspar Team	107
6	3	(Italy) Indonesian Racing Gresini Moto3	90
1	4	(Italy) Rivacold Snipers Team	82
1	5	(France) Red Bull KTM Tech3	81

=== MotoE ===
	Pos.	Rider	Points
	1	(Italy) Alessandro Zaccone	54
1	2	(Switzerland) Dominique Aegerter	53
2	3	(Spain) Jordi Torres	43
5	4	(Spain) Miquel Pons	36
3	5	(Italy) Mattia Casadei	33

== Notes ==
Previous race: 2021 Italian Grand Prix	FIM Grand Prix World Championship; 2021 season	Next race: 2021 German Grand Prix
Previous race: 2020 Catalan Grand Prix	Catalan motorcycle Grand Prix	Next race: 2022 Catalan Grand Prix
