= Fermín Aldeguer =

Spanish motorcycle road racer (born 2005)

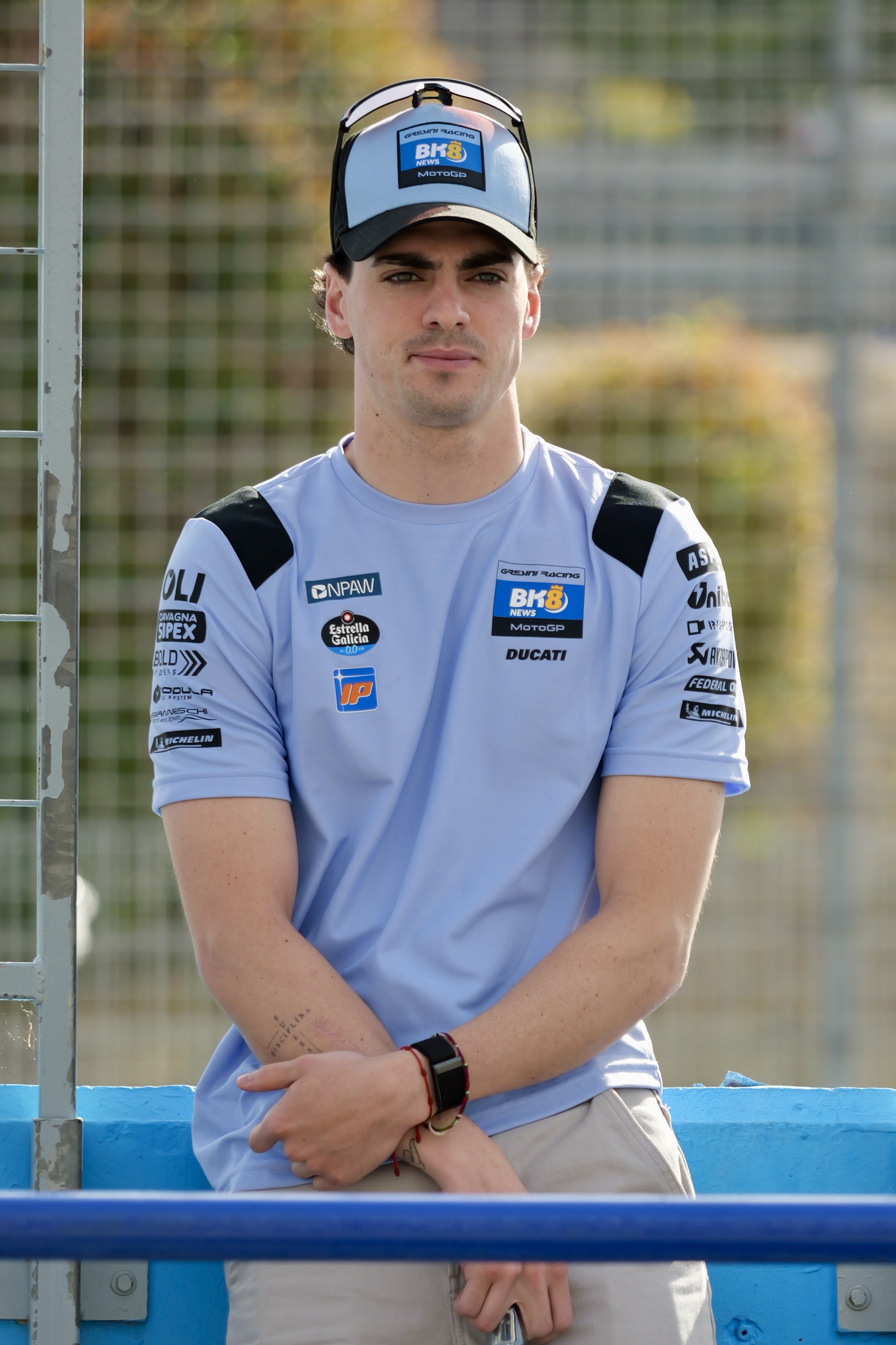
- Aldeguer at the 2026 Spanish Grand Prix
- Nationality: Spanish
- Born: 5 April 2005 (age 21); Murcia, Spain
- Current team: BK8 Gresini Racing MotoGP
- Bike number: 54
- Website: ferminaldeguer.es
Motorcycle racing career statistics
MotoGP World Championship
Active years	2025–
Manufacturers	Ducati
Championships	0
2025 championship position	8th (214 pts)
Starts / Wins / Podiums / Poles / F. laps / Points; 36 / 1 / 4 / 0 / 2 / 343
Moto2 World Championship
Active years	2021–2024
Manufacturers	Boscoscuro
Championships	0
2024 championship position	5th (182 pts)
Starts / Wins / Podiums / Poles / F. laps / Points; 67 / 8 / 12 / 8 / 6 / 487
MotoE World Championship
Active years	2021
Manufacturers	Energica
Championships	0
2021 championship position	9th (51 pts)
Starts / Wins / Podiums / Poles / F. laps / Points; 7 / 0 / 0 / 1 / 0 / 51

Fermín Aldeguer Mengual (born 5 April 2005) is a Spanish Grand Prix motorcycle road racer who races for the Ducati satellite team Gresini Racing in MotoGP.

Aldeguer became the second-youngest rider (20 years and 183 days old) to win a MotoGP race, behind Marc Márquez, after winning the 2025 Indonesian Grand Prix. He joined fellow Spanish riders Marc Márquez, Dani Pedrosa, and Jorge Lorenzo as riders to have won a premier-class race before the age of 21 in the MotoGP era. Aldeguer is set to leave Gresini at the end of 2026 to join the VR46 Racing Team.

== Personal life ==
Aldeguer was born in Murcia, same area where the fellow MotoGP rider Pedro Acosta is from.

Aldeguer is managed by former Grand Prix motorcycle racer Héctor Faubel.

== Career ==
=== Moto2 World Championship ===
==== Speed Up Racing (2021–2024) ====
In 2021, Aldeguer made several replacement appearances for the injured and suspended Yari Montella in the Moto2 category while competing full time in MotoE with the Aspar Team. He eventually replaced Montella for the last four rounds of the Moto2 season after the MotoE campaign ended in Misano. He ended the 2021 Moto2 campaign with two point scoring finishes in eight races, a 12th place in Mugello, and a seventh place in Aragon. At the end of the 2021 season, Aldeguer and the Speed Up team came to a new, three-year contract agreement.

=== MotoGP ===
==== Gresini Racing (2025–2026) ====
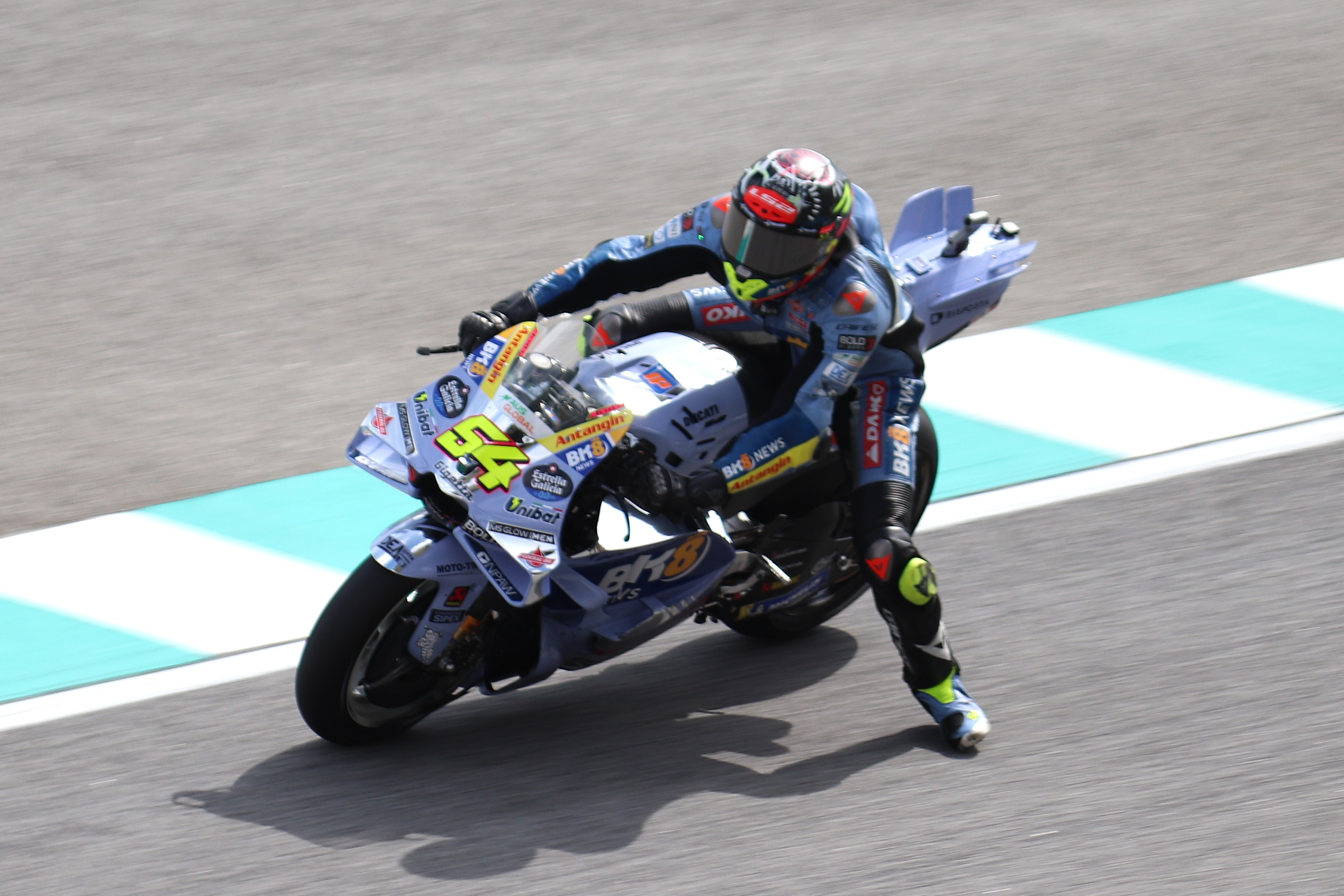
Aldeguer at the 2025 Malaysian Grand Prix

===== 2025 =====
On 28 August 2024, it was announced that he would sign a two-year contract with Gresini Racing moving up to MotoGP for the 2025 season. Aldeguer saw a consistent curve of improvement in the early races of 2025, as he took his first sprint and main race podiums at the French Grand Prix. A second podium finish came at the Red Bull Ring, with a late charge to second place. Aldeguer won his first race in the premier class after newly crowned world champion Marc Márquez and polesitter Marco Bezzecchi collided on opening lap at the Indonesian Grand Prix and became second-youngest rider to win a MotoGP race after Márquez himself.

===== 2026 =====
Aldeguer retain Gresini Racing for 2026 season. Aldeguer took his first podium of the season with a second-place finish at the Catalan Grand Prix.

==== VR46 Racing Team (2027–) ====
===== 2027 =====
On 26 August 2026, it was announced that Aldeguer had signed a two-year contract with VR46 Racing Team for 2027.

== Career statistics ==
=== European Talent Cup ===
==== Races by year ====
(key) (Races in bold indicate pole position; races in italics indicate fastest lap)

Year	Bike	1	2	3	4	5	6	7	8	9	10	11	Pos	Pts
2018	Honda	EST1; 3	EST2; Ret	VAL1; Ret	VAL2; Ret	CAT; Ret	ARA1; Ret	ARA2; Ret	JER1; Ret	JER2; 4	ALB; 3	VAL; 4	10th	58
2019	Honda	EST; 23	EST; 4	VAL; 2	VAL; 9	CAT; 2	ARA; 6	ARA; 5	JER; 8	JER; 12	ALB; 4	VAL; 2	3rd	126

=== FIM CEV Stock600 European Championship ===
==== Races by year ====
(key) (Races in bold indicate pole position) (Races in italics indicate fastest lap)

Year	Bike	1	2	3	4	5	6	7	8	9	10	11	Pos	Pts
2020	Yamaha	EST1; 1	EST2; 1	POR1; 1	POR2; 1	JER1; 1	JER2; 1	ARA1; 2	ARA2; 5	ARA3; 2	VAL1; 2	VAL2; 1	1st	246

=== FIM CEV Moto2 Championship ===
==== Races by year ====
(key) (Races in bold indicate pole position, races in italics indicate fastest lap)

Year	Bike	1	2	3	4	5	6	7	8	9	10	11	12	Pos	Pts
2021	Boscoscuro	EST1; 1	EST2; 1	VAL; 1	**CAT1**; 1	**CAT2**; 1	**POR1**; 1	**POR2**; 1	ARA1; 1	ARA2; C	JER1; 1	JER2; 2	VAL; 2	1st	265

=== Grand Prix motorcycle racing ===
==== By season ====
Season	Class	Motorcycle	Team	Race	Win	Podium	Pole	FLap	Pts	Plcd
2021	MotoE	Energica	OpenBank Aspar Team	7	0	0	1	0	51	9th
2021	Moto2	Boscoscuro	Speed Up Racing	8	0	0	0	0	13	25th
2022	Moto2	Boscoscuro	Speed Up Racing	20	0	0	2	0	80	15th
2023	Moto2	Boscoscuro	Speed Up Racing	20	5	7	3	4	212	**3rd**
2024	Moto2	Boscoscuro	Speed Up Racing	19	3	5	3	2	182	5th
2025	MotoGP	Ducati	BK8 Gresini Racing MotoGP	22	1	3	0	1	214	8th
2026	MotoGP	Ducati	BK8 Gresini Racing MotoGP	14	0	1	0	1	129*	11th*
Total				**110**	**9**	**16**	**9**	**8**	**881**	

==== By class ====
Class	Seasons	1st GP	1st pod	1st win	Race	Win	Podiums	Pole	FLap	Pts	WChmp
MotoE	2021	2021 Spain			7	0	0	1	0	51	0
Moto2	2021–2024	2021 Italy	2023 Great Britain	2023 Great Britain	67	8	12	8	6	487	0
MotoGP	2025–present	2025 Thailand	2025 France	2025 Indonesia	36	1	4	0	2	343	0
Total	2021–present				**110**	**9**	**16**	**9**	**8**	**881**	**0**

==== Races by year ====
(key) (Races in bold indicate pole position; races in italics indicate fastest lap; ^{superscript} indicates point-scoring sprint position)

Year	Class	Bike	1	2	3	4	5	6	7	8	9	10	11	12	13	14	15	16	17	18	19	20	21	22	Pos	Pts
2021	MotoE	Energica	SPA; Ret	FRA; 15	CAT; 6	NED; 7	**AUT**; 4	RSM1; 7	RSM2; 7																9th	51
2021	Moto2	Boscoscuro	QAT	DOH	POR	SPA	FRA	ITA; 12	CAT	GER; Ret	NED	STY	AUT	GBR; 16	ARA; 7	RSM	AME; 21	EMI; 16	ALR; 16	VAL; 17					25th	13
2022	Moto2	Boscoscuro	QAT; 16	INA; 7	**ARG**; Ret	AME; Ret	POR; 7	SPA; Ret	FRA; Ret	ITA; 14	CAT; 15	GER; 5	NED; 11	GBR; 15	AUT; Ret	RSM; Ret	ARA; 6	JPN; Ret	THA; Ret	**AUS**; 4	MAL; 10	VAL; 4			15th	80
2023	Moto2	Boscoscuro	POR; 13	ARG; 15	AME; 6	SPA; 10	FRA; 8	ITA; Ret	GER; 8	NED; 4	GBR; 1	AUT; 9	CAT; 13	RSM; Ret	IND; 12	JPN; 22	INA; 3	**AUS**; 3^{‡}	**THA**; 1	**MAL**; 1	QAT; 1	VAL; 1			3rd	212
2024	Moto2	Boscoscuro	QAT; 16	POR; 4	AME; 3	**SPA**; 1	FRA; 7	CAT; Ret	ITA; Ret	**NED**; 2	GER; 1	GBR; 12	AUT; 20	ARA; Ret	RSM; 6	EMI; 5	INA; 4	JPN; 12	**AUS**; 1	THA; Ret	MAL	SLD; 9			5th	182
2025	MotoGP	Ducati	THA; 13	ARG; 16	AME; Ret	QAT; 5^{4}	SPA; Ret^{5}	FRA; 3^{3}	GBR; 8	ARA; 6^{3}	ITA; 12^{9}	NED; Ret^{7}	GER; 5	CZE; 11	AUT; 2^{6}	HUN; 16^{5}	CAT; 15	RSM; 6^{6}	JPN; 10	INA; 1^{2}	AUS; 14	MAL; Ret^{7}	POR; 4^{6}	VAL; 5	8th	214
2026	MotoGP	Ducati	THA	BRA; 8	USA; 11	SPA; 9	FRA; 9	CAT; 2	ITA; 8^{6}	HUN; Ret^{5}	CZE; 6^{8}	NED; DNS	GER	GBR	ARA; 6^{6}	RSM; 4^{8}	AUT; 8^{8}	JPN; 9	INA; Ret^{7}	AUS	MAL	QAT; 12	POR	VAL	11th*	129*

^{‡} Half points awarded as less than half of the race distance (but at least three full laps) was completed.
* Season still in progress.
