= 2021 Spanish motorcycle Grand Prix =

Fourth round of the 2021 Grand Prix motorcycle racing season

(Spain) 2021 Spanish Grand Prix
Race details
- Race 4 of 18 races in the 2021 Grand Prix motorcycle racing season
- Date: 2 May 2021
- Official name: Gran Premio Red Bull de España
- Location: Circuito de Jerez – Ángel Nieto; Jerez de la Frontera, Cádiz, Spain
- Course: Permanent racing facility; 4.423 km (2.748 mi)

MotoGP
Pole position
Rider	(France) Fabio Quartararo	Yamaha
Time	1:36.755	
Fastest lap
Rider	(France) Fabio Quartararo	Yamaha
Time	1:37.770 on lap 8	
Podium
First	(Australia) Jack Miller	Ducati
Second	(Italy) Francesco Bagnaia	Ducati
Third	(Italy) Franco Morbidelli	Yamaha

Moto2
Pole position
Rider	(Australia) Remy Gardner	Kalex
Time	1:40.667	
Fastest lap
Rider	(United Kingdom) Sam Lowes	Kalex
Time	1:41.313 on lap 3	
Podium
First	(Italy) Fabio Di Giannantonio	Kalex
Second	(Italy) Marco Bezzecchi	Kalex
Third	(United Kingdom) Sam Lowes	Kalex

Moto3
Pole position
Rider	(Japan) Tatsuki Suzuki	Honda
Time	1:45.807	
Fastest lap
Rider	(Spain) Izan Guevara	Gas Gas
Time	1:46.158 on lap 3	
Podium
First	(Spain) Pedro Acosta	KTM
Second	(Italy) Romano Fenati	Husqvarna
Third	(Spain) Jeremy Alcoba	Honda

MotoE
Pole position
Rider	(Brazil) Eric Granado	Energica
Time	1:47.778	
Fastest lap
Rider	(Brazil) Eric Granado	Energica
Time	1:47.473 on lap 3	
Podium
First	(Italy) Alessandro Zaccone	Energica
Second	(Switzerland) Dominique Aegerter	Energica
Third	(Spain) Jordi Torres	Energica

The 2021 Spanish motorcycle Grand Prix (officially known as the Gran Premio Red Bull de España) was the fourth round of the 2021 Grand Prix motorcycle racing season and the first round of the 2021 MotoE World Cup. It was held at the Circuito de Jerez – Ángel Nieto in Jerez de la Frontera on 2 May 2021.

== MotoGP Championship standings before the race ==
After winning the Portuguese motorcycle Grand Prix, Fabio Quartararo leads the rider standings with 61 points, 15 more than Francesco Bagnaia. Maverick Viñales is third with 41 points, followed by Johann Zarco and Joan Mir, respectively on 40 and 38 points.

In the constructors' standings, Yamaha has full points with 75 points, followed by Ducati with 60 points and Suzuki with 42 points. Aprilia, KTM and Honda are enclosed in 5 points (25, 22 and 20).

In the team championship standings, Monster Energy Yamaha is first with 102 points, followed by Team Suzuki Ecstar, Ducati Lenovo Team and Pramac Racing respectively 41, 42 and 45 points behind. Aprilia Racing Team Gresini is fifth with 27 points.

== Qualifying ==
=== MotoGP ===
Fastest session lap

Pos.	No.	Biker	Constructor	Qualifying times		Final grid	Row
Pos.	No.	Biker	Constructor	Q1	Q2	Final grid	Row
1	20	(France) Fabio Quartararo	Yamaha	Qualified in Q2	1:36.755	1	1
2	21	(Italy) Franco Morbidelli	Yamaha	1:36.916	1:36.812	2	1
3	43	(Australia) Jack Miller	Ducati	Qualified in Q2	1:36.860	3	1
4	63	(Italy) Francesco Bagnaia	Ducati	Qualified in Q2	1:36.960	4	2
5	30	(Japan) Takaaki Nakagami	Honda	Qualified in Q2	1:37.008	5	2
6	5	(France) Johann Zarco	Ducati	Qualified in Q2	1:37.054	6	2
7	12	(Spain) Maverick Viñales	Yamaha	Qualified in Q2	1:37.070	7	3
8	41	(Spain) Aleix Espargaró	Aprilia	Qualified in Q2	1:37.085	8	3
9	42	(Spain) Álex Rins	Suzuki	Qualified in Q2	1:37.124	9	3
10	36	(Spain) Joan Mir	Suzuki	Qualified in Q2	1:37.154	10	4
11	33	(South Africa) Brad Binder	KTM	1:37.350	1:37.467	11	4
12	6	(Germany) Stefan Bradl	Honda	Qualified in Q2	1:37.502	12	4
13	44	(Spain) Pol Espargaró	Honda	1:37.407	N/A	13	5
14	93	(Spain) Marc Márquez	Honda	1:37.489	N/A	14	5
15	23	(Italy) Enea Bastianini	Ducati	1:37.675	N/A	15	5
16	88	(Portugal) Miguel Oliveira	KTM	1:37.746	N/A	16	6
17	46	(Italy) Valentino Rossi	Yamaha	1:37.915	N/A	17	6
18	10	(Italy) Luca Marini	Ducati	1:37.925	N/A	18	6
19	9	(Italy) Danilo Petrucci	KTM	1:38.065	N/A	19	7
20	73	(Spain) Álex Márquez	Honda	1:38.069	N/A	20	7
21	27	(Spain) Iker Lecuona	KTM	1:38.139	N/A	21	7
22	32	(Italy) Lorenzo Savadori	Aprilia	1:38.325	N/A	22	8
23	53	(Spain) Tito Rabat	Ducati	1:38.641	N/A	23	8
OFFICIAL MOTOGP QUALIFYING RESULTS

== Race ==
=== MotoGP ===
Pos.	No.	Rider	Team	Manufacturer	Laps	Time/Retired	Grid	Points
1	43	(Australia) Jack Miller	Ducati Lenovo Team	Ducati	25	41:05.602	3	25
2	63	(Italy) Francesco Bagnaia	Ducati Lenovo Team	Ducati	25	+1.912	4	20
3	21	(Italy) Franco Morbidelli	Petronas Yamaha SRT	Yamaha	25	+2.516	2	16
4	30	(Japan) Takaaki Nakagami	LCR Honda Idemitsu	Honda	25	+3.206	5	13
5	36	(Spain) Joan Mir	Team Suzuki Ecstar	Suzuki	25	+4.256	10	11
6	41	(Spain) Aleix Espargaró	Aprilia Racing Team Gresini	Aprilia	25	+5.164	8	10
7	12	(Spain) Maverick Viñales	Monster Energy Yamaha MotoGP	Yamaha	25	+5.651	7	9
8	5	(France) Johann Zarco	Pramac Racing	Ducati	25	+7.161	6	8
9	93	(Spain) Marc Márquez	Repsol Honda Team	Honda	25	+10.494	14	7
10	44	(Spain) Pol Espargaró	Repsol Honda Team	Honda	25	+11.776	13	6
11	88	(Portugal) Miguel Oliveira	Red Bull KTM Factory Racing	KTM	25	+14.766	16	5
12	6	(Germany) Stefan Bradl	Honda HRC	Honda	25	+17.243	12	4
13	20	(France) Fabio Quartararo	Monster Energy Yamaha MotoGP	Yamaha	25	+18.907	1	3
14	9	(Italy) Danilo Petrucci	Tech3 KTM Factory Racing	KTM	25	+20.095	19	2
15	10	(Italy) Luca Marini	Sky VR46 Avintia	Ducati	25	+20.922	18	1
16	46	(Italy) Valentino Rossi	Petronas Yamaha SRT	Yamaha	25	+22.731	17	
17	27	(Spain) Iker Lecuona	Tech3 KTM Factory Racing	KTM	25	+23.277 (Note: 3-second penalty.)	21	
18	53	(Spain) Tito Rabat	Pramac Racing	Ducati	25	+30.314	23	
19	32	(Italy) Lorenzo Savadori	Aprilia Racing Team Gresini	Aprilia	25	+37.912	22	
20	42	(Spain) Álex Rins	Team Suzuki Ecstar	Suzuki	25	+38.234	9	
Ret	33	(South Africa) Brad Binder	Red Bull KTM Factory Racing	KTM	11	Accident	11	
Ret	23	(Italy) Enea Bastianini	Avintia Esponsorama	Ducati	11	Accident Damage	15	
Ret	73	(Spain) Álex Márquez	LCR Honda Castrol	Honda	0	Accident	20	
Fastest lap: (France) Fabio Quartararo (Yamaha) – 1:37.770 (lap 8)

=== Moto2 ===
Pos.	No.	Rider	Manufacturer	Laps	Time/Retired	Grid	Points
1	21	(Italy) Fabio Di Giannantonio	Kalex	23	39:07.396	2	25
2	72	(Italy) Marco Bezzecchi	Kalex	23	+1.722	3	20
3	22	(United Kingdom) Sam Lowes	Kalex	23	+2.229	5	16
4	87	(Australia) Remy Gardner	Kalex	23	+3.019	1	13
5	25	(Spain) Raúl Fernández	Kalex	23	+8.571	4	11
6	97	(Spain) Xavi Vierge	Kalex	23	+12.181	6	10
7	79	(Japan) Ai Ogura	Kalex	23	+12.313	9	9
8	16	(United States) Joe Roberts	Kalex	23	+12.523	8	8
9	44	(Spain) Arón Canet	Boscoscuro	23	+14.407	10	7
10	23	(Germany) Marcel Schrötter	Kalex	23	+17.152	17	6
11	42	(Spain) Marcos Ramírez	Kalex	23	+18.071	13	5
12	9	(Spain) Jorge Navarro	Boscoscuro	23	+18.720	11	4
13	62	(Italy) Stefano Manzi	Kalex	23	+25.775	18	3
14	64	(Netherlands) Bo Bendsneyder	Kalex	23	+27.326	14	2
15 (Note: 1-position penalty.)	7	(Italy) Lorenzo Baldassarri	MV Agusta	23	+25.896	20	1
16	19	(Italy) Lorenzo Dalla Porta	Kalex	23	+31.359	22	
17	55	(Malaysia) Hafizh Syahrin	NTS	23	+35.845	27	
18	13	(Italy) Celestino Vietti	Kalex	23	+36.433	28	
19	12	(Switzerland) Thomas Lüthi	Kalex	23	+38.197	25	
20	5	(Italy) Yari Montella	Boscoscuro	23	+39.789	26	
21	14	(Italy) Tony Arbolino	Kalex	23	+40.083	23	
22	32	(Japan) Taiga Hada	NTS	23	+1:02.980	29	
23	10	(Italy) Tommaso Marcon	MV Agusta	23	+1:20.544	30	
Ret	6	(United States) Cameron Beaubier	Kalex	22	Accident	15	
Ret	24	(Italy) Simone Corsi	MV Agusta	13	Accident	24	
Ret	75	(Spain) Albert Arenas	Boscoscuro	11	Accident	16	
Ret	40	(Spain) Héctor Garzó	Kalex	5	Accident	19	
Ret	35	(Thailand) Somkiat Chantra	Kalex	3	Accident	21	
Ret	37	(Spain) Augusto Fernández	Kalex	2	Accident	7	
Ret	11	(Italy) Nicolò Bulega	Kalex	2	Accident	12	
DNS	96	(United Kingdom) Jake Dixon	Kalex		Did not start		
OFFICIAL MOTO2 RACE REPORT

- Jake Dixon suffered a concussion in a crash during warm-up session and was declared unfit to start the race.

=== Moto3 ===
Pos.	No.	Rider	Manufacturer	Laps	Time/Retired	Grid	Points
1	37	(Spain) Pedro Acosta	KTM	22	39:22.266	13	25
2	55	(Italy) Romano Fenati	Husqvarna	22	+0.417	5	20
3	52	(Spain) Jeremy Alcoba	Honda	22	+0.527	2	16
4	16	(Italy) Andrea Migno	Honda	22	+0.548	3	13
5	71	(Japan) Ayumu Sasaki	KTM	22	+0.971	8	11
6	99	(Spain) Carlos Tatay	KTM	22	+0.997	16	10
7	50	(Switzerland) Jason Dupasquier	KTM	22	+1.043	14	9
8	23	(Italy) Niccolò Antonelli	KTM	22	+1.144	9	8
9	43	(Spain) Xavier Artigas	Honda	22	+1.383	17	7
10	6	(Japan) Ryusei Yamanaka	KTM	22	+1.596	19	6
11	28	(Spain) Izan Guevara	Gas Gas	22	+3.986	11	5
12	12	(Czech Republic) Filip Salač	Honda	22	+4.389	12	4
13	11	(Spain) Sergio García	Gas Gas	22	+5.191	21	3
14	92	(Japan) Yuki Kunii	Honda	22	+7.204	18	2
15	82	(Italy) Stefano Nepa	KTM	22	+8.194	25	1
16	27	(Japan) Kaito Toba	KTM	22	+12.822	26	
17	54	(Italy) Riccardo Rossi	KTM	22	+12.869	24	
18	19	(Indonesia) Andi Farid Izdihar	Honda	22	+12.990	20	
19	73	(Austria) Maximilian Kofler	KTM	22	+17.318	27	
20	53	(Turkey) Deniz Öncü	KTM	22	+18.162	10	
21	5	(Spain) Jaume Masiá	KTM	22	+19.439	15	
22	40	(South Africa) Darryn Binder	Honda	22	+25.337	7	
23	20	(France) Lorenzo Fellon	Honda	22	+32.323	28	
24	31	(Spain) Adrián Fernández	Husqvarna	22	+46.228	22	
Ret	7	(Italy) Dennis Foggia	Honda	19	Accident	23	
Ret	24	(Japan) Tatsuki Suzuki	Honda	12	Accident Damage	1	
Ret	2	(Argentina) Gabriel Rodrigo	Honda	4	Accident	4	
Ret	17	(United Kingdom) John McPhee	Honda	0	Accident	6	
OFFICIAL MOTO3 RACE REPORT

=== MotoE ===
Pos.	No.	Rider	Laps	Time/Retired	Grid	Points
1	61	(Italy) Alessandro Zaccone	8	14:33.776	5	25
2	77	(Switzerland) Dominique Aegerter	8	+0.419	4	20
3	40	(Spain) Jordi Torres	8	+0.614	6	16
4	27	(Italy) Mattia Casadei	8	+4.273	7	13
5	71	(Spain) Miquel Pons	8	+6.105	10	11
6	11	(Italy) Matteo Ferrari	8	+6.704	18	10
7	78	(Japan) Hikari Okubo	8	+8.574	11	9
8	9	(Italy) Andrea Mantovani	8	+10.734	12	8
9	6	(Spain) María Herrera	8	+11.322	9	7
10	68	(Colombia) Yonny Hernández	8	+11.438	14	6
11	80	(Netherlands) Jasper Iwema	8	+27.858	15	5
12	14	(Portugal) André Pires	8	+28.027	17	4
13	51	(Brazil) Eric Granado	8	+55.429	1	3
14	21	(Italy) Kevin Zannoni	7	+1 lap	16	2
Ret	18	(Andorra) Xavi Cardelús	3	Accident	8	
Ret	3	(Germany) Lukas Tulovic	1	Accident	2	
Ret	54	(Spain) Fermín Aldeguer	1	Accident	3	
Ret	19	(France) Corentin Perolari	0	Accident	13	
OFFICIAL MOTOE RACE REPORT

- All bikes manufactured by Energica.

== Championship standings after the race ==
Below are the standings for the top five riders, constructors, and teams after the round.

=== MotoGP ===
Riders' Championship standings

	Pos.	Rider	Points
1	1	(Italy) Francesco Bagnaia	66
1	2	(France) Fabio Quartararo	64
	3	(Spain) Maverick Viñales	50
1	4	(Spain) Joan Mir	49
1	5	(France) Johann Zarco	48

Constructors' Championship standings

	Pos.	Constructor	Points
	1	(Japan) Yamaha	91
	2	(Italy) Ducati	85
	3	(Japan) Suzuki	53
	4	(Italy) Aprilia	35
1	5	(Japan) Honda	33

Teams' Championship standings

	Pos.	Team	Points
	1	(Japan) Monster Energy Yamaha MotoGP	114
1	2	(Italy) Ducati Lenovo Team	105
1	3	(Japan) Team Suzuki Ecstar	72
	4	(Italy) Pramac Racing	65
1	5	(Japan) Repsol Honda Team	40

=== Moto2 ===
Riders' Championship standings

	Pos.	Rider	Points
	1	(Australia) Remy Gardner	69
1	2	(United Kingdom) Sam Lowes	66
1	3	(Spain) Raúl Fernández	63
	4	(Italy) Marco Bezzecchi	56
	5	(Italy) Fabio Di Giannantonio	52

Constructors' Championship standings

Pos.	Constructor	Points
1	(Germany) Kalex	100
2	(Italy) Boscoscuro	36
3	(Italy) MV Agusta	3

Teams' Championship standings

	Pos.	Team	Points
	1	(Finland) Red Bull KTM Ajo	132
	2	(Belgium) Elf Marc VDS Racing Team	89
	3	(Italy) Sky Racing Team VR46	69
2	4	(Italy) Federal Oil Gresini Moto2	52
1	5	(Italy) Italtrans Racing Team	37

=== Moto3 ===
Riders' Championship standings

	Pos.	Rider	Points
	1	(Spain) Pedro Acosta	95
2	2	(Italy) Niccolò Antonelli	44
2	3	(Italy) Andrea Migno	42
6	4	(Italy) Romano Fenati	40
3	5	(Spain) Jaume Masiá	39

Constructors' Championship standings

	Pos.	Constructor	Points
	1	(Austria) KTM	100
	2	(Japan) Honda	72
1	3	(Sweden) Husqvarna	40
1	4	(Spain) Gas Gas	36

Teams' Championship standings

	Pos.	Team	Points
	1	(Finland) Red Bull KTM Ajo	134
	2	(Spain) Avintia Esponsorama Moto3	58
2	3	(Italy) Rivacold Snipers Team	52
1	4	(Spain) Solunion GasGas Aspar	48
1	5	(Germany) CarXpert Prüstel GP	46

=== MotoE ===
Pos.	Rider	Points
1	(Italy) Alessandro Zaccone	25
2	(Switzerland) Dominique Aegerter	20
3	(Spain) Jordi Torres	16
4	(Italy) Mattia Casadei	13
5	(Spain) Miquel Pons	11

== Notes ==
Previous race: 2021 Portuguese Grand Prix	FIM Grand Prix World Championship; 2021 season	Next race: 2021 French Grand Prix
Previous race: 2020 Spanish Grand Prix	Spanish motorcycle Grand Prix	Next race: 2022 Spanish Grand Prix
