= 2021 French motorcycle Grand Prix =

Fifth round of the 2021 Grand Prix motorcycle racing season

(France) 2021 French Grand Prix
Race details
- Race 5 of 18 races in the 2021 Grand Prix motorcycle racing season
- Date: 16 May 2021
- Official name: Shark Grand Prix de France
- Location: Bugatti Circuit; Le Mans, France
- Course: Permanent racing facility; 4.185 km (2.600 mi)

MotoGP
Pole position
Rider	(France) Fabio Quartararo	Yamaha
Time	1:32.600	
Fastest lap
Rider	(France) Fabio Quartararo	Yamaha
Time	1:33.048 on lap 2	
Podium
First	(Australia) Jack Miller	Ducati
Second	(France) Johann Zarco	Ducati
Third	(France) Fabio Quartararo	Yamaha

Moto2
Pole position
Rider	(Spain) Raúl Fernández	Kalex
Time	1:50.135	
Fastest lap
Rider	(Australia) Remy Gardner	Kalex
Time	1:36.893 on lap 18	
Podium
First	(Spain) Raúl Fernández	Kalex
Second	(Australia) Remy Gardner	Kalex
Third	(Italy) Marco Bezzecchi	Kalex

Moto3
Pole position
Rider	(Italy) Andrea Migno	Honda
Time	1:47.407	
Fastest lap
Rider	(Italy) Riccardo Rossi	KTM
Time	1:50.822 on lap 22	
Podium
First	(Spain) Sergio García	Gas Gas
Second	(Czech Republic) Filip Salač	Honda
Third	(Italy) Riccardo Rossi	KTM

MotoE
Pole position
Rider	(Brazil) Eric Granado	Energica
Time	2:00.315	
Fastest lap
Rider	(Italy) Matteo Ferrari	Energica
Time	1:43.951 on lap 7	
Podium
First	(Brazil) Eric Granado	Energica
Second	(Italy) Mattia Casadei	Energica
Third	(Italy) Alessandro Zaccone	Energica

The 2021 French motorcycle Grand Prix (officially known as the Shark Grand Prix de France) was the fifth round of the 2021 Grand Prix motorcycle racing season and the second round of the 2021 MotoE World Cup. It was held at the Bugatti Circuit in Le Mans on 16 May 2021.

== Qualifying ==
=== MotoGP ===
Fastest session lap

Pos.	No.	Biker	Constructor	Qualifying times		Final grid	Row
Pos.	No.	Biker	Constructor	Q1	Q2	Final grid	Row
1	20	(France) Fabio Quartararo	Yamaha	Qualified in Q2	1:32.600	1	1
2	12	(Spain) Maverick Viñales	Yamaha	Qualified in Q2	1:32.681	2	1
3	43	(Australia) Jack Miller	Ducati	Qualified in Q2	1:32.704	3	1
4	21	(Italy) Franco Morbidelli	Yamaha	Qualified in Q2	1:32.766	4	2
5	5	(France) Johann Zarco	Ducati	Qualified in Q2	1:32.877	5	2
6	93	(Spain) Marc Márquez	Honda	Qualified in Q2	1:33.037	6	2
7	30	(Japan) Takaaki Nakagami	Honda	Qualified in Q2	1:33.120	7	3
8	44	(Spain) Pol Espargaró	Honda	Qualified in Q2	1:33.150	8	3
9	46	(Italy) Valentino Rossi	Yamaha	Qualified in Q2	1:33.391	9	3
10	88	(Portugal) Miguel Oliveira	KTM	Qualified in Q2	1:33.867	10	4
11	32	(Italy) Lorenzo Savadori	Aprilia	1:42.550	1:34.258	11	4
12	10	(Italy) Luca Marini	Ducati	1:43.352	1:34.265	12	4
13	41	(Spain) Aleix Espargaró	Aprilia	1:43.418	N/A	13	5
14	36	(Spain) Joan Mir	Suzuki	1:43.422	N/A	14	5
15	42	(Spain) Álex Rins	Suzuki	1:43.523	N/A	15	5
16	63	(Italy) Francesco Bagnaia	Ducati	1:43.530	N/A	16	6
17	9	(Italy) Danilo Petrucci	KTM	1:43.857	N/A	17	6
18	27	(Spain) Iker Lecuona	KTM	1:44.324	N/A	18	6
19	73	(Spain) Álex Márquez	Honda	1:45.146	N/A	19	7
20	53	(Spain) Tito Rabat	Ducati	1:45.590	N/A	20	7
21	33	(South Africa) Brad Binder	KTM	1:45.911	N/A	21	7
22	23	(Italy) Enea Bastianini	Ducati	1:46.123	N/A	22	8
OFFICIAL MOTOGP QUALIFYING RESULTS

== Race ==
=== MotoGP ===
Pos.	No.	Rider	Team	Manufacturer	Laps	Time/Retired	Grid	Points
1	43	(Australia) Jack Miller	Ducati Lenovo Team	Ducati	27	47:25.473	3	25
2	5	(France) Johann Zarco	Pramac Racing	Ducati	27	+3.970	5	20
3	20	(France) Fabio Quartararo	Monster Energy Yamaha MotoGP	Yamaha	27	+14.468	1	16
4	63	(Italy) Francesco Bagnaia	Ducati Lenovo Team	Ducati	27	+16.172	16	13
5	9	(Italy) Danilo Petrucci	Tech3 KTM Factory Racing	KTM	27	+21.430	17	11
6	73	(Spain) Álex Márquez	LCR Honda Castrol	Honda	27	+23.509	19	10
7	30	(Japan) Takaaki Nakagami	LCR Honda Idemitsu	Honda	27	+30.164	7	9
8	44	(Spain) Pol Espargaró	Repsol Honda Team	Honda	27	+35.221	8	8
9	27	(Spain) Iker Lecuona	Tech3 KTM Factory Racing	KTM	27	+40.432	18	7
10	12	(Spain) Maverick Viñales	Monster Energy Yamaha MotoGP	Yamaha	27	+40.577	2	6
11	46	(Italy) Valentino Rossi	Petronas Yamaha SRT	Yamaha	27	+42.198	9	5
12	10	(Italy) Luca Marini	Sky VR46 Avintia	Ducati	27	+52.408	12	4
13	33	(South Africa) Brad Binder	Red Bull KTM Factory Racing	KTM	27	+59.377	21	3
14	23	(Italy) Enea Bastianini	Avintia Esponsorama	Ducati	27	+1:02.224	22	2
15	53	(Spain) Tito Rabat	Pramac Racing	Ducati	27	+1:09.651	20	1
16	21	(Italy) Franco Morbidelli	Petronas Yamaha SRT	Yamaha	23	+4 laps	4	
Ret	93	(Spain) Marc Márquez	Repsol Honda Team	Honda	17	Accident	6	
Ret	41	(Spain) Aleix Espargaró	Aprilia Racing Team Gresini	Aprilia	15	Engine	13	
Ret	88	(Portugal) Miguel Oliveira	Red Bull KTM Factory Racing	KTM	12	Accident	10	
Ret	42	(Spain) Álex Rins	Team Suzuki Ecstar	Suzuki	12	Accident	15	
Ret	32	(Italy) Lorenzo Savadori	Aprilia Racing Team Gresini	Aprilia	11	Engine	11	
Ret	36	(Spain) Joan Mir	Team Suzuki Ecstar	Suzuki	4	Accident	14	
Fastest lap: (France) Fabio Quartararo (Yamaha) – 1:33.048 (lap 2)

=== Moto2 ===
Yari Montella was replaced by Alonso López after the Friday practice sessions due to injury.

Pos.	No.	Rider	Manufacturer	Laps	Time/Retired	Grid	Points
1	25	(Spain) Raúl Fernández	Kalex	25	40:46.101	1	25
2	87	(Australia) Remy Gardner	Kalex	25	+1.490	7	20
3	72	(Italy) Marco Bezzecchi	Kalex	25	+4.599	2	16
4	14	(Italy) Tony Arbolino	Kalex	25	+7.503	19	13
5	64	(Netherlands) Bo Bendsneyder	Kalex	25	+11.887	6	11
6	23	(Germany) Marcel Schrötter	Kalex	25	+27.829	14	10
7	79	(Japan) Ai Ogura	Kalex	25	+27.975	16	9
8	21	(Italy) Fabio Di Giannantonio	Kalex	25	+28.112	15	8
9	24	(Italy) Simone Corsi	MV Agusta	25	+28.204	17	7
10	9	(Spain) Jorge Navarro	Boscoscuro	25	+28.432	18	6
11	11	(Italy) Nicolò Bulega	Kalex	25	+29.316	11	5
12 (Note: 1-position penalty for exceeding track limits on the last lap.)	35	(Thailand) Somkiat Chantra	Kalex	25	+28.749	26 (Note: 6-place grid penalty.)	4
13	42	(Spain) Marcos Ramírez	Kalex	25	+31.605	21	3
14	75	(Spain) Albert Arenas	Boscoscuro	25	+32.080	24	2
15	55	(Malaysia) Hafizh Syahrin	NTS	25	+32.571	27	1
16	70	(Belgium) Barry Baltus	NTS	25	+33.309	29	
17	7	(Italy) Lorenzo Baldassarri	MV Agusta	25	+39.036	13	
18	96	(United Kingdom) Jake Dixon	Kalex	25	+41.069	25	
19	13	(Italy) Celestino Vietti	Kalex	25	+45.599	28	
20	10	(Italy) Tommaso Marcon	MV Agusta	25	+1:19.160	30	
Ret	6	(United States) Cameron Beaubier	Kalex	20	Accident	23	
Ret	12	(Switzerland) Thomas Lüthi	Kalex	14	Accident	22	
Ret	40	(Spain) Héctor Garzó	Kalex	6	Accident	8	
Ret	16	(United States) Joe Roberts	Kalex	4	Accident	3	
Ret	97	(Spain) Xavi Vierge	Kalex	3	Collision	12	
Ret	22	(United Kingdom) Sam Lowes	Kalex	3	Collision	10	
Ret	62	(Italy) Stefano Manzi	Kalex	2	Accident	9	
Ret	2	(Spain) Alonso López	Boscoscuro	2	Accident	31	
Ret	37	(Spain) Augusto Fernández	Kalex	1	Accident	5	
Ret	44	(Spain) Arón Canet	Boscoscuro	0	Accident	4	
DSQ	19	(Italy) Lorenzo Dalla Porta	Kalex	25	(+28.989) (Note: Disqualified for a technical infringement.)	20	
OFFICIAL MOTO2 RACE REPORT

=== Moto3 ===
Pos.	No.	Rider	Manufacturer	Laps	Time/Retired	Grid	Points
1	11	(Spain) Sergio García	Gas Gas	22	42:21.172	8	25
2	12	(Czech Republic) Filip Salač	Honda	22	+2.349	7	20
3	54	(Italy) Riccardo Rossi	KTM	22	+5.589	2	16
4	17	(United Kingdom) John McPhee	Honda	22	+7.158	4	13
5	71	(Japan) Ayumu Sasaki	KTM	22	+14.882	15	11
6	31	(Spain) Adrián Fernández	Husqvarna	22	+27.279	26	10
7	43	(Spain) Xavier Artigas	Honda	22	+27.408	27	9
8	37	(Spain) Pedro Acosta	KTM	22	+29.880	21	8
9	53	(Turkey) Deniz Öncü	KTM	22	+35.098	13	7
10	55	(Italy) Romano Fenati	Husqvarna	22	+36.616	10	6
11	16	(Italy) Andrea Migno	Honda	22	+42.347	1	5
12	6	(Japan) Ryusei Yamanaka	KTM	22	+42.739	12	4
13	50	(Switzerland) Jason Dupasquier	KTM	22	+42.756	14	3
14	28	(Spain) Izan Guevara	Gas Gas	22	+50.891	24	2
15	19	(Indonesia) Andi Farid Izdihar	Honda	22	+52.753	28	1
16	73	(Austria) Maximilian Kofler	KTM	22	+53.054	22	
17	82	(Italy) Stefano Nepa	KTM	22	+53.568	11	
18	7	(Italy) Dennis Foggia	Honda	22	+1:18.995	18	
19	20	(France) Lorenzo Fellon	Honda	22	+1:19.103	25	
20	40	(South Africa) Darryn Binder	Honda	22	+1:54.124	16	
21	27	(Japan) Kaito Toba	KTM	21	+1 lap	19	
22	52	(Spain) Jeremy Alcoba	Honda	18	+4 laps	17	
Ret	99	(Spain) Carlos Tatay	KTM	14	Steering Damper	20	
Ret	32	(Japan) Takuma Matsuyama	Honda	3	Accident	23	
Ret	2	(Argentina) Gabriel Rodrigo	Honda	2	Accident	5	
Ret	5	(Spain) Jaume Masiá	KTM	1	Accident	3	
Ret	24	(Japan) Tatsuki Suzuki	Honda	1	Accident	9	
Ret	23	(Italy) Niccolò Antonelli	KTM	1	Accident Damage	6	
DNS	92	(Japan) Yuki Kunii	Honda		Did not start		
OFFICIAL MOTO3 RACE REPORT

- Yuki Kunii suffered a broken collarbone in a crash during qualifying and withdrew from the event.

=== MotoE ===
Pos.	No.	Rider	Laps	Time/Retired	Grid	Points
1	51	(Brazil) Eric Granado	7	12:23.012	1	25
2	27	(Italy) Mattia Casadei	7	+0.306	15	20
3	61	(Italy) Alessandro Zaccone	7	+0.253	5	16
4	77	(Switzerland) Dominique Aegerter	7	+0.532	6	13
5	40	(Spain) Jordi Torres	7	+0.640	11	11
6	68	(Colombia) Yonny Hernández	7	+0.900	9	10
7	3	(Germany) Lukas Tulovic	7	+1.045	12	9
8	11	(Italy) Matteo Ferrari	7	+1.751	3	8
9	19	(France) Corentin Perolari	7	+4.727	16 (Note: 3-place grid penalty.)	7
10	6	(Spain) María Herrera	7	+4.999	18	6
11	21	(Italy) Kevin Zannoni	7	+15.509	17	5
12	14	(Portugal) André Pires	7	+29.350	14	4
13	18	(Andorra) Xavi Cardelús	7	+29.485	4	3
14	80	(Netherlands) Jasper Iwema	7	+37.419	13	2
15	54	(Spain) Fermín Aldeguer	7	+1:06.915	8	1
Ret	78	(Japan) Hikari Okubo	2	Collision	10	
DNS	71	(Spain) Miquel Pons	0	Did not start	2	
DNS	9	(Italy) Andrea Mantovani	0	Did not start	7	
OFFICIAL MOTOE RACE REPORT

- All bikes manufactured by Energica.

== Championship standings after the race ==
Below are the standings for the top five riders, constructors, and teams after the round.

=== MotoGP ===
Riders' Championship standings

	Pos.	Rider	Points
1	1	(France) Fabio Quartararo	80
1	2	(Italy) Francesco Bagnaia	79
2	3	(France) Johann Zarco	68
2	4	(Australia) Jack Miller	64
2	5	(Spain) Maverick Viñales	56

Constructors' Championship standings

	Pos.	Constructor	Points
1	1	(Italy) Ducati	110
1	2	(Japan) Yamaha	107
	3	(Japan) Suzuki	53
1	4	(Japan) Honda	43
1	5	(Austria) KTM	38

Teams' Championship standings

	Pos.	Team	Points
1	1	(Italy) Ducati Lenovo Team	143
1	2	(Japan) Monster Energy Yamaha MotoGP	136
1	3	(Italy) Pramac Racing	86
1	4	(Japan) Team Suzuki Ecstar	72
	5	(Japan) Repsol Honda Team	48

=== Moto2 ===
Riders' Championship standings

	Pos.	Rider	Points
	1	(Australia) Remy Gardner	89
1	2	(Spain) Raúl Fernández	88
1	3	(Italy) Marco Bezzecchi	72
2	4	(United Kingdom) Sam Lowes	66
	5	(Italy) Fabio Di Giannantonio	60

Constructors' Championship standings

Pos.	Constructor	Points
1	(Germany) Kalex	125
2	(Italy) Boscoscuro	42
3	(Italy) MV Agusta	10
4	(Japan) NTS	1

Teams' Championship standings

	Pos.	Team	Points
	1	(Finland) Red Bull KTM Ajo	177
	2	(Belgium) Elf Marc VDS Racing Team	89
	3	(Italy) Sky Racing Team VR46	85
	4	(Italy) Federal Oil Gresini Moto2	65
3	5	(Germany) Liqui Moly Intact GP	48

=== Moto3 ===
Riders' Championship standings

	Pos.	Rider	Points
	1	(Spain) Pedro Acosta	103
7	2	(Spain) Sergio García	49
	3	(Italy) Andrea Migno	47
	4	(Italy) Romano Fenati	46
3	5	(Italy) Niccolò Antonelli	44

Constructors' Championship standings

	Pos.	Constructor	Points
	1	(Austria) KTM	116
	2	(Japan) Honda	92
1	3	(Spain) Gas Gas	61
1	4	(Sweden) Husqvarna	50

Teams' Championship standings

	Pos.	Team	Points
	1	(Finland) Red Bull KTM Ajo	142
1	2	(Italy) Rivacold Snipers Team	77
1	3	(Spain) Gaviota GasGas Aspar Team	75
2	4	(Spain) Avintia Esponsorama Moto3	58
2	5	(Italy) Sterilgarda Max Racing Team	56

=== MotoE ===
	Pos.	Rider	Points
	1	(Italy) Alessandro Zaccone	41
2	2	(Italy) Mattia Casadei	33
1	3	(Switzerland) Dominique Aegerter	33
9	4	(Brazil) Eric Granado	28
2	5	(Spain) Jordi Torres	27

== Notes ==
Previous race: 2021 Spanish Grand Prix	FIM Grand Prix World Championship; 2021 season	Next race: 2021 Italian Grand Prix
Previous race: 2020 French Grand Prix	French motorcycle Grand Prix	Next race: 2022 French Grand Prix
