= 2021 MotoE World Cup =

3rd running of the MotoE World Cup

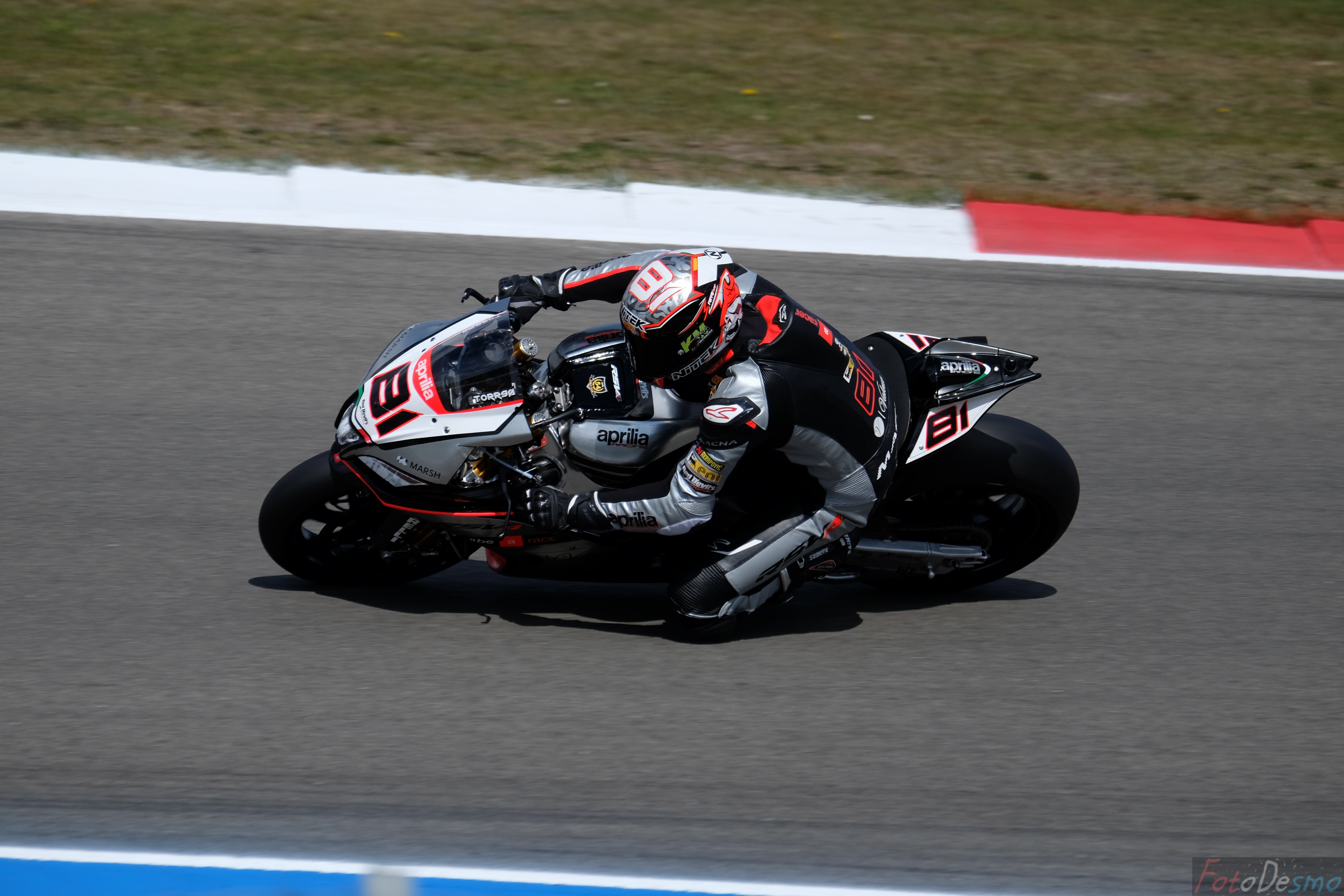
Jordi Torres (pictured in 2015) was the 2021 MotoE World Cup winner.

The 2021 MotoE World Cup (known officially as the 2021 FIM Enel MotoE World Cup for sponsorship reasons) was the third season of the MotoE World Cup for electric motorcycle racing, and was a support series of the 73rd Fédération Internationale de Motocyclisme (FIM) Road Racing World Championship season.

The Cup was won by Spanish rider Jordi Torres for the second consecutive season at the final round in Misano.

== Teams and riders ==
All teams used the series-specified Energica Ego Corsa.

Team	No.	Rider	Rounds
(Finland) Avant Ajo MotoE	78	(Japan) Hikari Okubo	All
(Spain) Avintia Esponsorama Racing	14	(Portugal) André Pires	All
(Spain) Avintia Esponsorama Racing	18	(Andorra) Xavier Cardelús	All
(Germany) Dynavolt Intact GP	77	(Switzerland) Dominique Aegerter	All
(Italy) Indonesian E-Racing Gresini MotoE	9	(Italy) Andrea Mantovani	All
(Italy) Indonesian E-Racing Gresini MotoE	11	(Italy) Matteo Ferrari	All
(Monaco) LCR E-Team	21	(Italy) Kevin Zannoni	All
(Monaco) LCR E-Team	71	(Spain) Miquel Pons	All
(Italy) Octo Pramac MotoE	61	(Italy) Alessandro Zaccone	All
(Italy) Octo Pramac MotoE	68	(Colombia) Yonny Hernández	All
(Malaysia) One Energy Racing	51	(Brazil) Eric Granado	All
(Italy) Ongetta Sic58 Squadracorse	27	(Italy) Mattia Casadei	1–4, 6
(Italy) Ongetta Sic58 Squadracorse	43	(Italy) Stefano Valtulini	5
(Spain) OpenBank Aspar Team	6	(Spain) María Herrera	All
(Spain) OpenBank Aspar Team	54	(Spain) Fermín Aldeguer	All
(Spain) Pons Racing 40 (Spain) HP Pons 40	40	(Spain) Jordi Torres	All
(Spain) Pons Racing 40 (Spain) HP Pons 40	80	(Netherlands) Jasper Iwema	All
(France) Tech3 E-Racing	3	(Germany) Lukas Tulovic	All
(France) Tech3 E-Racing	19	(France) Corentin Perolari	All

Key
Regular rider
Replacement rider

=== Rider changes ===
- Alex de Angelis announced his retirement from motorcycle racing at the end of 2020.
- Alessandro Zaccone moved from Gresini Racing to replace de Angelis at Pramac.
- Andrea Mantovani made his full season debut with Gresini Racing to replace Zaccone.
- Yonny Hernández made his class debut, replacing Joshua Hook at Pramac, and returning to the MotoGP paddock for the first time since 2017.
- Eric Granado moved from Esponsorama Racing to WithU Motorsport, replacing Jakub Kornfeil.
- André Pires made his class debut with Esponsorama Racing, replacing Granado.
- Corentin Perolari made his full season debut with Tech3 to replace Tommaso Marcon.
- Rookies Miquel Pons and Kevin Zannoni joined LCR E-Team to replace Xavier Siméon and Niccolò Canepa.
- Hikari Okubo joined Avant Ajo MotoE for his debut in the class, replacing Niki Tuuli.
- Jasper Iwema made his debut in the class with Pons Racing 40 adding a second bike, marking his first return to the MotoGP paddock since 2015.
- Fermín Aldeguer entered the class to replace compatriot Alejandro Medina at Aspar.

=== Team changes ===
- Marc VDS and their rider Mike Di Meglio left the class for 2021, citing scheduling conflicts with Di Meglio's Endurance World Championship entries.
- Pons Racing added a second entry in the grid vacancy left by Marc VDS' withdrawal.

=== Mid season changes ===
- Mattia Casadei missed the Austrian round due to him testing positive for COVID-19. He was replaced by Stefano Valtulini for the round.

== Regulation changes ==
On weekends with two races, the E-Pole qualifying session would determine the starting grid for both races. Previously, the starting grid for the second race was based on the results of the first race.

== Calendar ==
The 2021 MotoE provisional calendar was released on 11 November 2020, featuring 7 races at 6 venues, supporting the Spanish, French, Catalan, Dutch, Austrian, and San Marino Grand Prix—the latter being a double header.

Round	Date	Grand Prix	Circuit
1	2 May	(Spain) Gran Premio Red Bull de España	Circuito de Jerez, Jerez de la Frontera
2	16 May	Shark Grand Prix de France	Bugatti Circuit, Le Mans
3	6 June	(Catalonia) Gran Premi Monster Energy de Catalunya	Circuit de Barcelona-Catalunya, Montmeló
4	27 June	(Netherlands) Motul TT Assen	TT Circuit Assen, Assen
5	15 August	(Austria) Bitci Motorrad Grand Prix von Österreich	Red Bull Ring, Spielberg
6	18 September	Gran Premio Octo di San Marino e della Riviera di Rimini	Misano World Circuit, Misano Adriatico
6	19 September	Gran Premio Octo di San Marino e della Riviera di Rimini	Misano World Circuit, Misano Adriatico

== Results and standings ==
=== Grands Prix ===
Round	Grand Prix	Pole position	Fastest lap	Winning rider	Winning team	Report
1	(Spain) Spanish motorcycle Grand Prix	(Brazil) Eric Granado	(Brazil) Eric Granado	(Italy) Alessandro Zaccone	(Italy) Octo Pramac MotoE	Report
2	(France) French motorcycle Grand Prix	(Brazil) Eric Granado	(Italy) Matteo Ferrari	(Brazil) Eric Granado	(Malaysia) One Energy Racing	Report
3	(Catalonia) Catalan motorcycle Grand Prix	(Brazil) Eric Granado	(Brazil) Eric Granado	(Spain) Miquel Pons	(Monaco) LCR E-Team	Report
4	(Netherlands) Dutch TT	(Brazil) Eric Granado	(Brazil) Eric Granado	(Brazil) Eric Granado	(Malaysia) One Energy Racing	Report
5	(Austria) Austrian motorcycle Grand Prix	(Spain) Fermín Aldeguer	(Brazil) Eric Granado	(Germany) Lukas Tulovic	(France) Tech3 E-Racing	Report
6	San Marino and Rimini Riviera motorcycle Grand Prix	(Spain) Jordi Torres	(Italy) Kevin Zannoni	(Spain) Jordi Torres	(Spain) HP Pons 40	Report
6	San Marino and Rimini Riviera motorcycle Grand Prix	(Spain) Jordi Torres	(Switzerland) Dominique Aegerter	(Italy) Matteo Ferrari	(Italy) Indonesian E-Racing Gresini MotoE	Report

=== Cup standings ===
Scoring system

Points were awarded to the top fifteen finishers. A rider had to finish the race to earn points.

Position	1st	2nd	3rd	4th	5th	6th	7th	8th	9th	10th	11th	12th	13th	14th	15th
Points	25	20	16	13	11	10	9	8	7	6	5	4	3	2	1

Pos.	Rider	SPA (Spain)	FRA (France)	CAT (Catalonia)	NED (Netherlands)	AUT (Austria)	RSM (San Marino)		Pts
1	(Spain) Jordi Torres	3	5	3	2	7	1^{P}	13^{P}	100
2	(Switzerland) Dominique Aegerter	2	4	2	18	3	2	12^{F}	93
3	(Italy) Matteo Ferrari	6	8^{F}	7	4	8	4	1	86
4	(Brazil) Eric Granado	13^{P F}	1^{P}	Ret^{P F}	1^{P F}	2^{F}	Ret	5	84
5	(Italy) Alessandro Zaccone	1	3	4	3	6	Ret	DNS	80
6	(Italy) Mattia Casadei	4	2	Ret	6		3	2	79
7	(Spain) Miquel Pons	5	DNS	1	10	12	5	3	73
8	(Germany) Lukas Tulovic	Ret	7	8	5	1	8	15	62
9	(Spain) Fermín Aldeguer	Ret	15	6	7	4^{P}	7	7	51
10	(Colombia) Yonny Hernández	10	6	5	9	10	9	Ret	47
11	(Japan) Hikari Okubo	7	Ret	9	8	5	Ret	6	45
12	(Italy) Kevin Zannoni	14	11	12	13	9	6^{F}	4	44
13	(France) Corentin Perolari	Ret	9	10	11	13	12	10	31
14	(Italy) Andrea Mantovani	8	DNS	14	14	11	11	9	29
15	(Spain) María Herrera	9	10	11	15	17	13	11	27
16	(Andorra) Xavier Cardelús	Ret	13	Ret	12	18	10	8	21
17	(Netherlands) Jasper Iwema	11	14	Ret	16	14	14	14	13
18	(Portugal) André Pires	12	12	13	17	16	15	DNS	12
19	(Italy) Stefano Valtulini					15			1
Pos.	Rider	SPA (Spain)	FRA (France)	CAT (Catalonia)	NED (Netherlands)	AUT (Austria)	RSM (San Marino)		Pts

Race key
Colour	Result
Gold	Winner
Silver	2nd place
Bronze	3rd place
Green	Points finish
Blue	Non-points finish
Blue	Non-classified finish (NC)
Purple	Retired (Ret)
Red	Did not qualify (DNQ)
Black	Disqualified (DSQ)
White	Did not start (DNS)
White	Withdrew (WD)
White	Race cancelled (C)
Blank	Did not practice (DNP)
Blank	Excluded (EX)
Blank	Did not arrive (DNA)
Blank	Did not enter (empty cell)
Annotation	Meaning
P	Pole position
F	Fastest lap
Rider key
Colour	Meaning
Light blue	Rookie rider
