= André Pires (motorcyclist) =

Portuguese motorcycle racer

- Nationality: Portuguese
- Born: 29 August 1989 (age 37); Vila Pouca de Aguiar, Portugal
- Current team: Avintia Esponsorama Racing
- Bike number: 14
Motorcycle racing career statistics
MotoE World Championship
Active years	2021–
Manufacturers	Energica
2021 championship position	18th (12 pts)
Starts / Wins / Podiums / Poles / F. laps / Points; 6 / 0 / 0 / 0 / 0 / 12

André Samuel Silva Pires (born 29 August 1989) is a Portuguese motorcycle racer.

== Career ==
Pires was the Portuguese champion of 125GP in 2011, Portuguese champion of Superstock 600 in 2012 and Portuguese champion of Superbikes in 2014. He has seven participations in the Macau Grand Prix (best place 13th) and one on the Isle of Man TT in 2016.

Since 2021, Pires competes in the MotoE World Cup.

== Career statistics ==
=== Career summary ===
Season	Series	Team	Races	Wins	Poles	FLaps	Podiums	Points	Position
2005	Objectivo GP							161	**3rd**
2006	Resistência Vodafone		1	0	0	0	1	N/A	**3rd**
2006	Campeonato 85cc	Moto Germano					1		9th
2007	Campeonato 85cc	Moto Benga							4th
2008	Campeonato 85cc	Racing Soares		4		1	7		**3rd**
2010	Campeonato 85cc	Racing Nery Monteiro	9	0			6		**2nd**
2011	125GP								**1st**
2012	Superstock 600								**1st**
2014	Campeonato Nacional de Velocidade								**1st**
2015	Campeonato Nacional de Velocidade		3						
2015	Macau Grand Prix		1	0	0	0	0	0	20th
2016	Campeonato Nacional de Velocidade		2						
2016	Macau Grand Prix		1	0	0	0	0	N/A	19th
2016	Isle of Man TT - Superstock		1	0	0	0	0	N/A	52nd
2017	Campeonato Nacional de Velocidade Superbikes	Oneundret Racing Team	8	0			6	125	**2nd**
2017	Macau Grand Prix		1	0	0	0	0	N/A	23rd
2018	Campeonato Nacional de Velocidade Superbikes			0			5	84	**3rd**
2018	Macau Grand Prix		1	0	0	0	0	N/A	19rd
2019	Campeonato Nacional de Velocidade Superbikes			1			6	162.5	**3rd**
2020	Campeonato Nacional de Velocidade Superbikes			0			2	71	7th
2021	MotoE World Cup		6	0	0	0	0	12	18th
2022	Macau Grand Prix		1					5	7th
2021	MotoE World Cup		6	0	0	0	0	12	18th

=== Portuguese Speed Championship ===
==== Races by year ====
(key)

Year	Class	Bike	1	2	3	4	5	6	7	8	9	10	11	12	Pos	Pts
2017	Superbikes	Kawasaki	POR; 3	EST; 2	BRA; C	POR; 3	POR; 2	EST; 2	EST; 4	EST; 2	EST				2nd	125
2018	Superbikes	Yamaha	EST; 3	POR	EST; 3	EST; 2	POR; 3	POR; 3	EST; C	EST; C					3rd	84
2019	Superbikes	Yamaha	EST; DSQ	EST; 2	POR; 3	POR; 4	POR; 4	POR; 4	EST; 7	EST	EST; 1	EST; 2	EST; 2	EST; 2	3rd	162.5
2020	Superbikes	Yamaha	EST; 3	EST; 4	POR	POR; 4	EST; 4	EST; 3	POR	POR	EST	EST	EST	EST	7th	71

=== Isle of Man TT ===
==== 2016 ====
Race	Position	Time	Speed	Bike
Superstock	52nd	01:00:59.82	111.34	Suzuki

=== Grand Prix motorcycle racing ===
==== By season ====
Season	Class	Motorcycle	Team	Race	Win	Podium	Pole	FLap	Pts	Plcd
2021	MotoE	Energica	Avintia Esponsorama Racing	6	0	0	0	0	12	18th
Total				**6**	**0**	**0**	**0**	**0**	**12**	

==== By class ====
Class	Seasons	1st GP	1st Pod	1st Win	Race	Win	Podiums	Pole	FLap	Pts	WChmp
MotoE	2021–present	2021 Spain			6	0	0	0	0	12	0
Total	2021–present				**6**	**0**	**0**	**0**	**0**	**12**	**0**

==== Races by year ====
(key) (Races in bold indicate pole position; races in italics indicate fastest lap)

Year	Class	Bike	1	2	3	4	5	6	7	Pos	Pts
2021	MotoE	Energica	SPA; 12	FRA; 12	CAT; 13	NED; 17	AUT; 16	RSM1; 15	RSM2; DNS	18th	12
