= Yari Montella =

Italian motorcycle racer (born 2000)

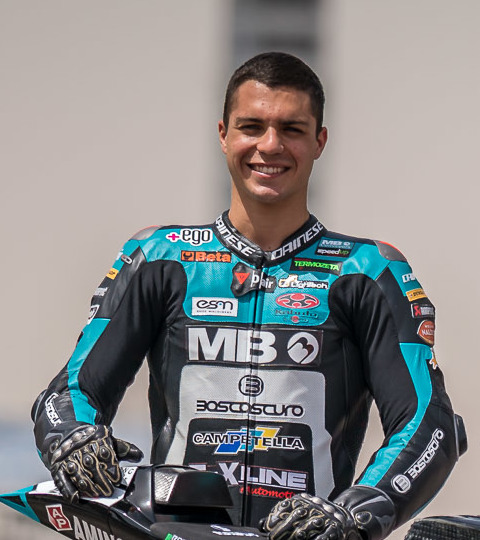
- Montella in 2021
- Nationality: Italian
- Born: 5 January 2000 (age 26); Oliveto Citra, Italy
- Current team: Barni Spark Racing Team
- Bike number: 5
Motorcycle racing career statistics
Moto2 World Championship
Active years	2021
Manufacturers	Boscoscuro
Championships	0
2021 championship position	34th (0 pts)
Starts / Wins / Podiums / Poles / F. laps / Points; 7 / 0 / 0 / 0 / 0 / 0
Moto3 World Championship
Active years	2018
Manufacturers	Honda
Championships	0
2018 championship position	37th (0 pts)
Starts / Wins / Podiums / Poles / F. laps / Points; 2 / 0 / 0 / 0 / 0 / 0
Superbike World Championship
Active years	2025–
Manufacturers	Ducati
2026 championship position	3rd (318 pts)
Starts / Wins / Podiums / Poles / F. laps / Points; 72 / 0 / 14 / 0 / 0 / 392
Supersport World Championship
Active years	2021–2024
Manufacturers	Yamaha (2021); Kawasaki (2022); Ducati (2023–2024)
Championships	0
2024 championship position	3rd (382 pts)
Starts / Wins / Podiums / Poles / F. laps / Points; 70 / 8 / 20 / 3 / 6 / 714

Yari Montella (born 5 January 2000) is an Italian motorcycle racer, currently contracted to Barni Spark Racing Team, in the 2027 Superbike World Championship. Montella won the 2026 Independents Cup of the Superbike World Championship.

== Career ==
=== Early career ===
In 2014, Montella won the Italian Sport Production Championship in the 250 class.

=== FIM CEV Moto3 Junior World Championship ===
==== 2016 ====
Montella made his debut in motorcycle racing at the age of 16, riding for Sic58 Squadra Corse in the 2016 FIM CEV Moto3 Junior World Championship, partnered by Tony Arbolino. Montella finished in the points three times during the season, his highest finish being a seventh place in the last round of Valencia. His teammate, Arbolino, won a race, and was second in another.

==== 2017 ====
In 2017, Montella stayed with Sic58 Squadra Corse for the 2017 season, but was partnered by Mattia Casadei. Montella did better than in his first season, finishing in the points five times, his season's best finish a fifth place in Estoril.

==== 2018 ====
Once again, for the 2018 season, Montella stayed with Sic58 Squadra Corse, this time partnered by Bruno Ieraci. Montella finished in the points six times throughout the season, ending with a career high 34 points, 17th in the standings.

=== Moto3 World Championship ===
In 2018, Montella was handed two wild-card appearances in the 2018 Moto3 World Championship, also in the colors of Sic58 Squadra Corse, for the San Marino and the Australian Grand Prixs, but did not get points, finishing in 19th and 16th respectively.

=== FIM CEV Moto2 European Championship ===
==== 2019 ====
For the 2019 season, Montella graduated from Moto3 Junior, to the Moto2 European championship. He, and teammate Tommaso Marcon, rode for Speed Up's Team Ciatti. Montella had two third place finishes, in Catalunya and Valencia, and ended the season seventh in the standings with 77 points.

==== 2020 ====
The 2020 season would be the breakthrough in Montella's career. Remaining with Speed Up and Team Ciatti, Montella would dominate the season, winning the first six races, winning eight out of the eleven races, and finishing in the top-two in ten out of the 11 races held that season. His only retirement came in Aragon, and Montella won the title by 44 points ahead of second place Niki Tuuli. After his performance, Montella was signed to a full-time Moto2 seat, by Speed Up.

=== Moto2 World Championship ===
==== 2021 ====
Speed Up and Montella came into the 2021 Moto2 World Championship with high hopes, with the team having two podiums in 2020. Teammate Jorge Navarro was coming into his fifth season of Moto2, and started off with two points finishes straight away. But Montella struggled mightily, failing to finish in the points for the first four races of the season. On the fifth weekend in France, Montella suffered a wrist injury in practice, and an operation was deemed necessary by doctors. This ruled him out of not just the French race, but also the Italian, Catalan, German, and Dutch Grand Prixs. His replacement, Fermín Aldeguer, finished in 12th in Italy, his first race in the category, leading to questions about Montella's inability to score points. Montella returned for the next two rounds, a double-header in Austria, but once again failed to score points. Citing bugging injury concerns, Speed Up decided to suspend Montella for the next two races, Silverstone and Aragon, in order to ensure he heals properly. His replacement was once again Fermín Aldeguer, who scored a brilliant seventh place finish in Aragon. Montella came back for the next round, but after crashing out and scoring no points yet again, the team terminated his contract immediately.

=== Supersport World Championship ===
==== 2021 ====
Following the termination of his contract in Moto2, Yamaha gave Montella a wild-card appearance in the 2021 Supersport World Championship. He seized the chance, finishing race one in tenth, and race two in sixth place, in Portugal.

==== 2022 ====
In November 2021, following Montella's good performances in Portugal, Kawasaki announced they signed Montella to ride for the Kawasaki Puccetti team, in the 2022 Supersport World Championship. Montella would replace Philipp Öttl, who left the team to graduate to the Superbike World Championship.

==== 2023 ====
Montella rode for the Ducati team, Barni Spark Racing Team, in the 2023 Supersport World Championship. In tests and qualifying, he proved to be fast with excellent bike performance. Unfortunately, after an excellent qualifying in Race 1 of the 2023 Phillip Island Grand Prix Circuit, he collided with driver Adrián Huertas, who fell in front of him, cause to a wet race, with heavy rain. The race was immediately stopped with a red flag due to this serious accident. The accident caused Montella to suffer a compound fracture of the right clavicle.

==== 2024 ====
Montella managed to reach third place in the final standings with seven wins.

=== Superbike World Championship ===
==== 2025– ====
After finishing third in the Supersport standings, Montella had the opportunity to compete in World Superbike starting in 2025. He would continue to race for the Barni Spark Racing Team and would be paired with Danilo Petrucci.

== Career statistics ==
=== FIM CEV Moto3 Junior World Championship ===
==== Races by year ====
(key) (Races in bold indicate pole position, races in italics indicate fastest lap)

Year	Bike	1	2	3	4	5	6	7	8	9	10	11	12	Pos	Pts
2016	Honda	VAL1; 17	VAL2; 21	LMS; 26	ARA; 18	CAT1; 10	CAT2; Ret	ALB; 18	ALG; 21	JER1; 21	JER2; 20	VAL1; 8	VAL2; 7	21st	23
2017	Honda	ALB; Ret	LMS; Ret	CAT1; 10	CAT2; Ret	VAL1; Ret	VAL2; 8	EST; 5	JER1; 20	JER1; 14	ARA; 15	VAL1; Ret	VAL2; DNS	18th	28
2018	Honda	EST; 6	VAL1; 11	VAL2; 33	FRA; 10	CAT1; 15	CAT2; 10	ARA; 10	JER1; Ret	JER2; Ret	ALB; 20	VAL1; Ret	VAL2; Ret	17th	34

=== FIM CEV Moto2 European Championship ===
==== Races by year ====
(key) (Races in bold indicate pole position; races in italics indicate fastest lap)

Year	Bike	1	2	3	4	5	6	7	8	9	10	11	Pos	Pts
2019	Speed Up	EST1; Ret	EST2; 5	VAL; 4	CAT1; 3	CAT2; Ret	ARA1; 8	ARA2; 5	JER; Ret	ALB1; 14	ALB2; DNS	VAL; 3	7th	77
2020	Speed Up	EST1; 1	**EST2**; 1	**POR1**; 1	**POR2**; 1	**JER1**; 1	**JER2**; 1	ARA1; 2	ARA2; Ret	ARA3; 1	VAL1; 2	VAL2; 1	1st	240

=== Grand Prix motorcycle racing ===
==== By season ====
Season	Class	Motorcycle	Team	Race	Win	Podium	Pole	FLap	Pts	Plcd
2018	Moto3	Honda	Sic58 Squadra Corse	2	0	0	0	0	0	37th
2021	Moto2	Boscoscuro	Speed Up Racing	7	0	0	0	0	0	34th
Total				**9**	**0**	**0**	**0**	**0**	**0**	

==== By class ====
Class	Seasons	1st GP	1st pod	1st win	Race	Win	Podiums	Pole	FLap	Pts	WChmp
Moto3	2018	2018 San Marino			2	0	0	0	0	0	0
Moto2	2021	2021 Qatar			7	0	0	0	0	0	0
Total	2018, 2021				**9**	**0**	**0**	**0**	**1**	**32**	**0**

==== Races by year ====
(key) (Races in bold indicate pole position; races in italics indicate fastest lap)

Year	Class	Bike	1	2	3	4	5	6	7	8	9	10	11	12	13	14	15	16	17	18	19	Pos	Pts
2018	Moto3	Honda	QAT	ARG	AME	SPA	FRA	ITA	CAT	NED	GER	CZE	AUT	GBR	RSM; 19	ARA	THA	JPN	AUS; 16	MAL	VAL	37th	0
2021	Moto2	Boscoscuro	QAT; 20	DOH; 18	POR; Ret	SPA; 20	FRA; WD	ITA	CAT	GER	NED	STY; 24	AUT; Ret	GBR	ARA	RSM; Ret	AME	EMI	ALR	VAL		34th	0

=== Supersport World Championship ===
==== Races by year ====
(key) (Races in bold indicate pole position; races in italics indicate fastest lap)

Year	Bike	1		2		3		4		5		6		7		8		9		10		11		12		Pos	Pts
Year	Bike	R1	R2	R1	R2	R1	R2	R1	R2	R1	R2	R1	R2	R1	R2	R1	R2	R1	R2	R1	R2	R1	R2	R1	R2	Pos	Pts
2021	Yamaha	SPA	SPA	POR	POR	ITA	ITA	NED	NED	CZE	CZE	SPA	SPA	FRA	FRA	SPA	SPA	SPA	SPA	POR; 10	POR; 6	ARG	ARG	INA	INA	23rd	16
2022	Kawasaki	SPA; Ret	SPA; 7	NED; 12	NED; 9	POR; 6	POR; 4	ITA; 6	ITA; 7	GBR; 4	GBR; Ret	CZE; Ret	CZE; Ret	FRA; 5	FRA; 10	SPA; 13	SPA; 8	POR; 13	POR; Ret	ARG; 8	ARG; Ret	INA; 5	INA; 5	AUS; 1	AUS; 5	7th	171
2023	Ducati	AUS; Ret	AUS; DNS	INA; DNS	INA; DNS	NED; 8	NED; Ret	SPA; 11	SPA; 16	EMI; 5	EMI; Ret	GBR; 3	GBR; 2	ITA; 5	ITA; 3	CZE; Ret	CZE; Ret	FRA; 6	FRA; 8	SPA; 3	SPA; 8	POR; Ret	POR; 3	JER; Ret	JER; DNS	9th	145
2024	Ducati	AUS; 1	**AUS**; 1	SPA; 4	SPA; 4	NED; Ret	NED; 7	**ITA**; 2	ITA; 2	GBR; 3	GBR; 2	**CZE**; 4	CZE; 3	POR; 1	**POR**; 1	FRA; 6	FRA; 1	ITA; 3	ITA; Ret	SPA; 4	SPA; 1	**POR**; 1	**POR**; Ret	SPA; 2	SPA; 8	3rd	382

=== Superbike World Championship ===
==== By season ====
Season	Motorcycle	Team	Race	Win	Podium	Pole	FLap	Pts	Plcd
2025	Ducati Panigale V4 R	Barni Spark Racing Team	36	0	0	0	0	74	18th
2026	Ducati Panigale V4 R	Barni Spark Racing Team	36	0	14	0	0	318	**3rd**
Total			**72**	**0**	**14**	**0**	**0**	**392**	

==== Races by year ====
(key) (Races in bold indicate pole position) (Races in italics indicate fastest lap)

Year	Bike	1			2			3			4			5			6			7			8			9			10			11			12			Pos	Pts
Year	Bike	R1	SR	R2	R1	SR	R2	R1	SR	R2	R1	SR	R2	R1	SR	R2	R1	SR	R2	R1	SR	R2	R1	SR	R2	R1	SR	R2	R1	SR	R2	R1	SR	R2	R1	SR	R2	Pos	Pts
2025	Ducati	AUS; Ret	AUS; 8	AUS; 9	POR; Ret	POR; 17	POR; 10	NED; Ret	NED; 8	NED; 13	ITA; 14	ITA; 14	ITA; 16	CZE; 8	CZE; 11	CZE; 8	EMI; 8	EMI; Ret	EMI; Ret	GBR; Ret	GBR; 15	GBR; 13	HUN; 7	HUN; Ret	HUN; 10	FRA; Ret	FRA; Ret	FRA; Ret	ARA; 12	ARA; Ret	ARA; 16	POR; Ret	POR; 19	POR; 15	SPA; 13	SPA; 11	SPA; 14	18th	74
2026	Ducati	AUS; 2	AUS; 4	AUS; Ret	POR; 16	POR; 6	POR; NC	NED; 11	NED; 8	NED; 5	HUN; 4	HUN; 5	HUN; 3	CZE; 3	CZE; 3	CZE; 3	ARA; 7	ARA; 9	ARA; Ret	EMI; 3	EMI; 3	EMI; 3	GBR; 3	GBR; 2	GBR; 3	FRA; 4	FRA; 3	FRA; 3	ITA; Ret	ITA; 4	ITA; 3	POR; 8	POR; 13	POR; 4	SPA; 5	SPA; 4	SPA; 5	3rd	318
