= 2019 FIM CEV Moto2 European Championship =

2019 FIM CEV Moto2 European Championship
Previous:	2018	Next:	2020
Support series: FIM CEV Moto3 Junior World Championship; European Talent Cup

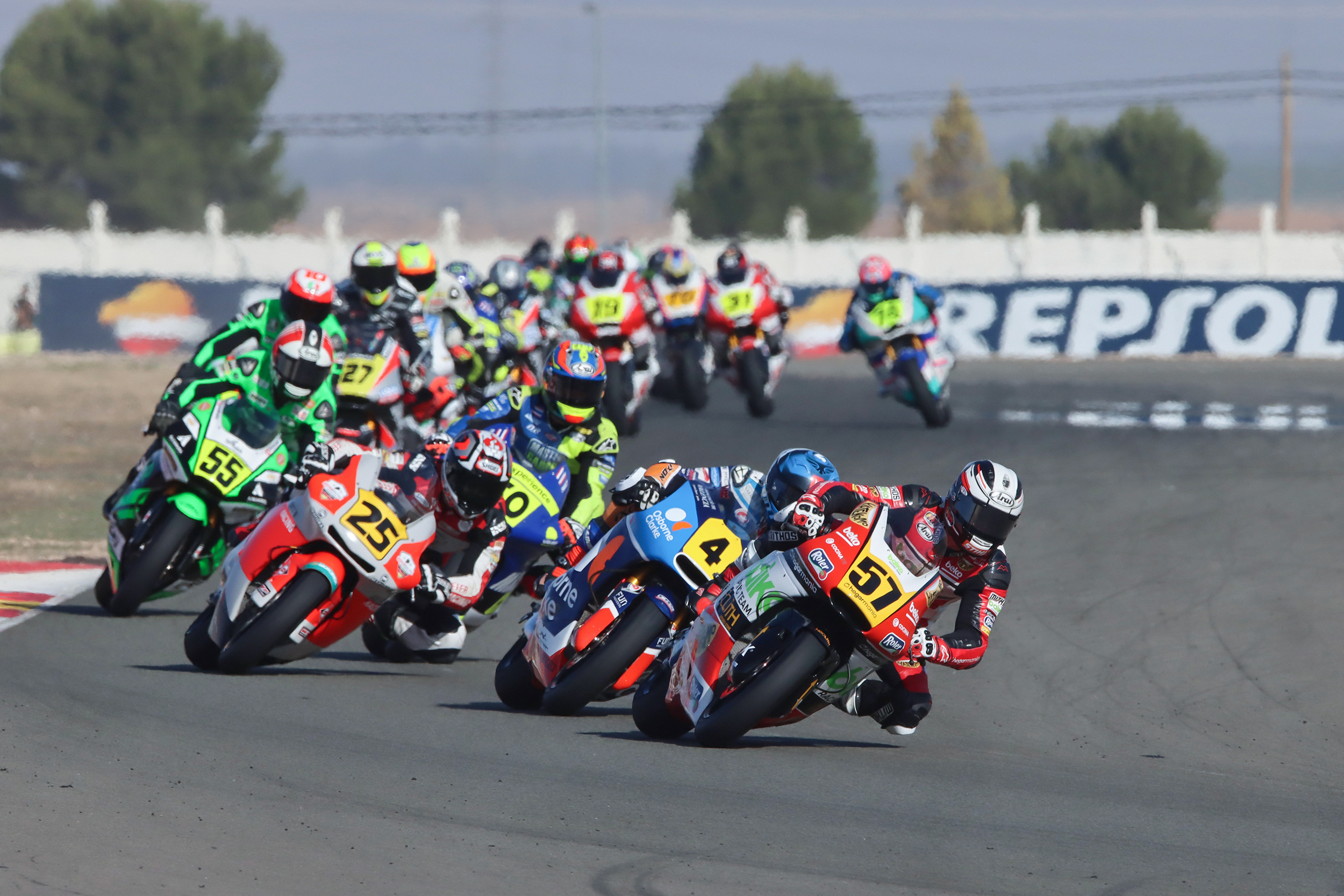
2019 champion Edgar Pons leading the field at Albacete

The 2019 FIM CEV Moto2 European Championship is the tenth CEV Moto2 season and the fourth under the FIM banner.

== Calendar ==
The following races are scheduled to take place in 2019.

Round	Date	Circuit	Pole position	Fastest lap	Race winner	Winning constructor
1	7 April	(Portugal) Estoril	(Spain) Edgar Pons	(Italy) Yari Montella	(Finland) Niki Tuuli	(Germany) Kalex
1	7 April	(Portugal) Estoril	(Spain) Edgar Pons	(Spain) Edgar Pons	(Italy) Alessandro Zaccone	(Germany) Kalex
2	28 April	(Spain) Valencia	(Spain) Edgar Pons	(Spain) Edgar Pons	(Spain) Edgar Pons	(Germany) Kalex
3	9 June	(Spain) Catalunya	(Spain) Edgar Pons	(Spain) Edgar Pons	(Spain) Edgar Pons	(Germany) Kalex
3	9 June	(Spain) Catalunya	(Spain) Edgar Pons	(Spain) Edgar Pons	(Spain) Edgar Pons	(Germany) Kalex
4	14 July	(Spain) Aragón	(Spain) Edgar Pons	(Italy) Tommaso Marcon	(Spain) Héctor Garzó	(France) Tech 3
4	14 July	(Spain) Aragón	(Spain) Edgar Pons	(Spain) Edgar Pons	(Spain) Edgar Pons	(Germany) Kalex
5	29 September	(Spain) Jerez	(Spain) Héctor Garzó	(Spain) Héctor Garzó	(Spain) Edgar Pons	(Germany) Kalex
6	13 October	(Spain) Albacete	(Spain) Edgar Pons	(Spain) Héctor Garzó	(Spain) Edgar Pons	(Germany) Kalex
6	13 October	(Spain) Albacete	(Spain) Edgar Pons	(Spain) Héctor Garzó	(Spain) Héctor Garzó	(France) Tech 3
7	10 November	(Spain) Valencia	(Spain) Héctor Garzó	(Spain) Edgar Pons	(Spain) Edgar Pons	(Germany) Kalex

== Entry list ==
Team	Constructor	No.	Rider	Rounds
Moto2
(United Kingdom) Nykos Racing	Honda	5	(Belgium) Luca de Vleeschauwer	
(Japan) Astra Honda Racing Team	Kalex	19	(Indonesia) Andi Farid	3, 5-7
(Japan) Astra Honda Racing Team	Kalex	31	(Indonesia) Gerry Salim	1-3, 5-7
(Spain) Baiko Racing Team	Kalex	13	(Japan) Taiga Hada	5-6
(Spain) Baiko Racing Team	Kalex	35	(United States) Benny Solis	1-3
(Spain) Baiko Racing Team	Kalex	57	(Spain) Edgar Pons	All
(Germany) Dynavolt Intact SIC Junior Team	Kalex	21	(Germany) Matthias Meggle	1-6
(Germany) Dynavolt Intact SIC Junior Team	Kalex	27	(Malaysia) Kasma Daniel	All
(Spain) EasyRace Team	Kalex	2	(China) Heng Su	
(Spain) EasyRace Team	Kalex	33	(Spain) Daniel Valle	1-4
(Spain) EasyRace Team	Kalex	70	(Japan) Takeshi Ishizuka	All
(Spain) EasyRace Team	Kalex	95	(Austria) Julian Mayer	4, 6-7
(Italy) Gresini Laglisse Academy	Kalex	11	(Italy) Matteo Ferrari	1-2, 4-5, 7
(Italy) Grupo Machado–Came	Kalex	8	(Italy) Matteo Porretta	
(Spain) H43 Team Nobby Talasur-Blumaq	Kalex	77	(Spain) Miquel Pons	All
(United Kingdom) IDWE Racing	Kalex	3	(United Kingdom) Sam Wilford	1, 4-7
(Spain) ONEXOX TKKR SAG Team	Kalex	32	(Malaysia) Ramdan Rosli	1-6
(Spain) ONEXOX TKKR SAG Team	Kalex	84	(Malaysia) Azlan Shah	3, 7
(Spain) ONEXOX TKKR SAG Team	Kalex	87	(Malaysia) Nazirul Muhammad Bahruddin	4-7
(Spain) PromoRacing	Kalex	24	(Australia) Chandler Cooper	1-2
(Spain) PromoRacing	Kalex	61	(Italy) Alessandro Zaccone	All
(Malaysia) SIC Junior Team	Kalex	7	(Malaysia) Adam Norrodin	1-4
(Spain) Team Stylobike	Kalex	18	(Finland) Niki Tuuli	1-4
(Spain) Team Stylobike	Kalex	51	(Italy) Matteo Ciprietti	All
(Spain) Team Stylobike	Kalex	74	(Poland) Piotr Biesiekirski	2-7
(Italy) VR46 Master Camp Team	Kalex	9	(Thailand) Keminth Kubo	All
(Italy) VR46 Master Camp Team	Kalex	50	(Thailand) Anupab Sarmoon	All
(Spain) Fundación Andreas Pérez 77	KTM	16	(Spain) Álex Ruiz	1-2
(Germany) Kiefer Racing	KTM	25	(Switzerland) Marcel Brenner	All
(France) Yohann Moto Sport	Mistral	23	(France) Cédric Tangre	1-4, 6-7
(United Kingdom) Nykos Racing	Nykos	95	(Austria) Julian Mayer	1-2
(Italy) Team Ciatti	Speed Up	10	(Italy) Tommaso Marcon	All
(Italy) Team Ciatti	Speed Up	55	(Italy) Yari Montella	All
(Spain) CNS Motorsport	Tech 3	4	(Spain) Héctor Garzó	All
Superstock 600
(Spain) DCR Racing Team	Yamaha	48	(Spain) Joan Díaz	All
(Spain) EasyRace Team	Yamaha	29	(Martinique) Lyvann Luchel	1-3, 7
(Spain) EasyRace Team	Yamaha	47	(Spain) Aarón Polanco	5-7
(Spain) FAU55 El Senõr De Las Bolsas	Yamaha	88	(Italy) Alessandro Zetti	All
(Spain) KPR Innovation Team	Yamaha	26	(Spain) Mario Gómez-Caro	3, 6
(Spain) Redding – Pinamoto RS	Yamaha	12	(Finland) Peetu Paavilainen	All
(Spain) Redding – Pinamoto RS	Yamaha	41	(Germany) Kevin Orgis	All
(Spain) Redding – Pinamoto RS	Yamaha	44	(Germany) Kevin Orgis	
(Spain) Redding – Pinamoto RS	Yamaha	45	(Germany) Leon Orgis	1-4
(Spain) Yamaha Laglisse	Yamaha	66	(France) Philippe Le Gallo	1-5
Entry Lists:

== Championship standings ==
Scoring system

Points were awarded to the top fifteen finishers. A rider had to finish the race to earn points.

Position	1st	2nd	3rd	4th	5th	6th	7th	8th	9th	10th	11th	12th	13th	14th	15th
Points	25	20	16	13	11	10	9	8	7	6	5	4	3	2	1

=== Riders' championship ===
Pos.	Rider	Bike	EST (Portugal)		VAL (Spain)	CAT (Spain)		ARA (Spain)		JER (Spain)	ALB (Spain)		VAL (Spain)	Points
Moto2/overall
1	(Spain) Edgar Pons	Kalex	2	3	1	1	1	6	1	1	1	Ret	1	221
2	(Spain) Héctor Garzó	Tech 3	Ret	4	2	2	Ret	1	2	2	2	1	2	183
3	(Italy) Alessandro Zaccone	Kalex	5	1	8	Ret	4	7	4	3	5	2	5	137
4	(Italy) Tommaso Marcon	Speed Up	9	6	3	6	3	4	6	4	4	3	4	137
5	(Finland) Niki Tuuli	Kalex	1	2	DNS	4	2	9	3					101
6	(Spain) Miquel Pons	Kalex	4	Ret	5	7	7	3	7	Ret	3	4	20	96
7	(Italy) Yari Montella	Speed Up	Ret	5	4	3	Ret	8	5	Ret	14	DNS	3	77
8	(Malaysia) Ramdan Rosli	Kalex	3	7	9	20	11	5	11	7	10	DNS		68
9	(Thailand) Keminth Kubo	Kalex	Ret	19	13	17	13	10	9	5	7	6	9	56
10	(Malaysia) Kasma Daniel	Kalex	Ret	9	7	14	17	2	Ret	Ret	8	Ret	8	54
11	(Switzerland) Marcel Brenner	KTM	13	14	Ret	13	6	26	DNS	6	Ret	5	7	48
12	(Thailand) Anupab Sarmoon	Kalex	20	13	24	5	Ret	11	10	10	6	DNS	11	46
13	(Italy) Matteo Ferrari	Kalex	7	11	6			12	8	Ret			6	46
14	(Indonesia) Andi Farid Izdihar	Kalex				12	5			8	12	7	26	36
15	(Malaysia) Adam Norrodin	Kalex	8	15	10	11	8	13	12					35
16	(Germany) Matthias Meggle	Kalex	6	12	Ret	8	Ret	15	15	Ret	9	DNS		31
17	(Indonesia) Gerry Salim	Kalex	Ret	10	12	18	10			9	13	Ret	DNS	26
18	(Poland) Piotr Biesiekirski	Kalex			DNS	15	14	DNS	Ret	11	11	8	15	22
19	(Italy) Matteo Ciprietti	Kalex	23	24	14	16	9	21	16	Ret	22	9	13	19
20	(Spain) Dani Valle	Kalex	12	20	11	9	Ret	16	13					19
21	(Malaysia) Azlan Shah	Kalex				10	12						10	16
22	(United States) Benigno Rene Solis	Kalex	Ret	8	17	22	Ret							8
23	(France) Cédric Tangre	Mistral	10	18	16	19	16	14			18	Ret	Ret	8
24	(Austria) Julian Mayer	Nykos	16	22	27									8
24	(Austria) Julian Mayer	Kalex						18	14		17	10	18	8
25	(Japan) Takeshi Ishizuka	Kalex	24	28	18	21	15	24	20	Ret	15	11	19	7
26	(Australia) Chandler Cooper	Kalex	11	21	21									5
27	(Finland) Peetu Paavilainen	Yamaha	Ret	25	23	25	20	25	21	14	21	13	21	5
28	(Spain) Joan Díaz	Yamaha	14	26	19	Ret	Ret	23	17	15	16	18	14	5
29	(United States) Brandon Scott Paasch	Kalex											12	4
30	(Malaysia) Nazirul bin Muhammad	Kalex						17	19	19	24	12	24	4
31	(Japan) Taiga Hada	Kalex								12	DNS	DNS		4
32	(United Kingdom) Sam Wilford	Kalex	15	16				22	Ret	13	20	16	22	4
33	(Spain) Aarón Polanco	Yamaha								18	23	14	16	2
34	(Spain) Álex Ruiz	KTM	17	17	15									1
35	(Italy) Alessandro Zetti	Yamaha	21	23	20	23	18	27	18	17	19	15	25	1
	(Germany) Kevin Orgis	Yamaha	19	27	25	24	22	19	Ret	16	27	DNS	Ret	0
	(Germany) Leon Orgis	Yamaha	18	Ret	22	DNS	21	20	22					0
	(Spain) Mario Gómez-Caro	Yamaha				26	19				26	DNS		0
	(France) Philippe Le Gallo	Yamaha	DNQ	DNQ	28	28	24	28	23	20				0
	(Martinique) Lyvann Luchel	Yamaha	22	29	26	27	23						27	0
Superstock 600
1	(Italy) Alessandro Zetti	Yamaha	4	1	2	1	1	5	2	4	2	3	4	201
2	(Spain) Joan Díaz	Yamaha	1	3	1	Ret	Ret	3	1	2	1	4	1	190
3	(Finland) Peetu Paavilainen	Yamaha	Ret	2	4	3	3	4	3	1	3	1	3	176
4	(Germany) Kevin Orgis	Yamaha	3	4	5	2	5	1	Ret	3	6	DNS	Ret	122
5	(Germany) Leon Orgis	Yamaha	2	Ret	3	DNS	4	2	4					82
6	(Martinique) Lyvann Luchel	Yamaha	5	5	6	5	6						5	64
7	(Spain) Aarón Polanco	Yamaha								5	4	2	2	64
8	(France) Philippe Le Gallo	Yamaha	DNQ	DNQ	7	6	7	6	5	6				59
9	(Spain) Mario Gómez-Caro	Yamaha				4	2				5	DNS		44
Pos.	Rider	Bike	EST (Portugal)		VAL (Spain)	CAT (Spain)		ARA (Spain)		JER (Spain)	ALB (Spain)		VAL (Spain)	Points

=== Manufacturers' championship ===
Pos.	Manufacturer	EST (Portugal)		VAL (Spain)	CAT (Spain)		ARA (Spain)		JER (Spain)	ALB (Spain)		VAL (Spain)	Points
Moto2
1	(Germany) Kalex	1	1	1	1	1	2	1	1	1	2	1	265
2	(France) Tech 3	Ret	4	2	2	Ret	1	2	2	2	1	2	183
3	(Italy) Speed Up	9	5	3	3	3	4	5	4	4	3	3	148
4	(Austria) KTM	13	14	15	13	6	26	DNS	6	Ret	5	7	48
5	(France) Mistral	10	18	16	19	16	14	Ret		18	Ret	Ret	8
	(United Kingdom) Nykos	16	22	27									0
	(Japan) Honda						Ret	DNS		25	17	DNS	0
Superstock 600
1	(Japan) Yamaha	1	1	1	1	1	1	1	1	1	1	1	275
Pos.	Manufacturer	EST (Portugal)		VAL (Spain)	CAT (Spain)		ARA (Spain)		JER (Spain)	ALB (Spain)		VAL (Spain)	Points
