= Adam Norrodin =

Malaysian motorcycle racer

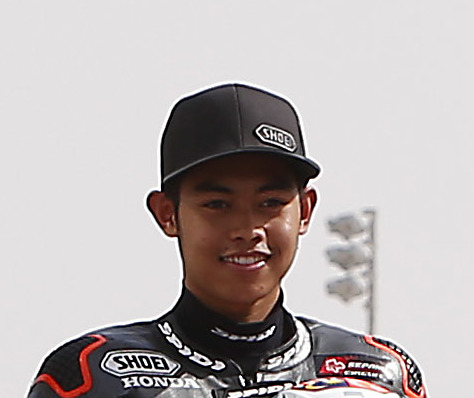
- Norrodin in 2018
- Nationality: Malaysian
- Born: 13 June 1998 (age 28); Johor, Malaysia
- Current team: Petronas MIE Racing Honda Team
- Bike number: 27
Motorcycle racing career statistics
Moto2 World Championship
Active years	2019, 2021
Manufacturers	Kalex
Championships	0
2021 championship position	NC (0 pts)
Starts / Wins / Podiums / Poles / F. laps / Points; 7 / 0 / 0 / 0 / 0 / 0
Moto3 World Championship
Active years	2016–2018
Manufacturers	Honda
Championships	0
2018 championship position	21st (46 pts)
Starts / Wins / Podiums / Poles / F. laps / Points; 52 / 0 / 0 / 0 / 1 / 102
Supersport World Championship
Active years	2023–
Manufacturers	Honda
Championships	0
2023 championship position	25th (20 pts)
Starts / Wins / Podiums / Poles / F. laps / Points; 17 / 0 / 0 / 0 / 0 / 20

Muhamad Adam bin Mohd Norrodin (born 13 June 1998) is a Malaysian Grand Prix motorcycle racer.

== Career ==
=== Early career ===
Adam raced in the Asia Talent Cup in 2014 and 2015, and the 2015 FIM CEV Moto3 Junior World Championship. He became the first rider from the former series to compete in the World Championship on his Moto3 début in 2016.

=== Moto3 World Championship ===
==== Drive M7 SIC Racing Team (2016) ====
Adam made his World Championship début in the Moto3 series in 2016, partnering Jakub Kornfeil on a Honda run by the Malaysian SIC Racing Team. He finished 28th in the Riders' Championship with a best finish of 11th, in Argentina and Australia. In the former of these two races, he was on course for third place in wet weather conditions (behind compatriot Khairul Idham Pawi and Jorge Navarro), but crashed at the last corner whilst attempting to overtake Navarro. He pushed his damaged bike over the finish line but dropped eight places in the process.

==== SIC Racing Team (2017) ====
Adam remained with the SIC Racing Team for 2017, alongside 2015 Asia Talent Cup champion and World Championship rookie Ayumu Sasaki. He improved to 17th place in the riders' standings, with four top-ten finishes and his first fastest lap, at his home race in Malaysia, despite crashing and rejoining the race.

==== Petronas Sprinta Racing (2018) ====
Adam continued with the SIC Racing Team (now renamed Petronas Sprinta Racing) with Sasaki for the 2018 season.

== Career statistics ==
=== FIM CEV Moto3 Junior World Championship ===
==== Races by year ====
(key) (Races in bold indicate pole position, races in italics indicate fastest lap)

Year	Bike	1	2	3	4	5	6	7	8	9	10	11	12	Pos	Pts
2014	KTM	JER1; 23	JER2; 32	LMS; 18	ARA; 21	CAT1; 38	CAT2; 22	ALB; 18	NAV; 13	ALG; 15	VAL1; 20	VAL2; 23		31st	4
2015	Honda	ALG; Ret	LMS; 16	CAT1; Ret	CAT2; 18	ARA1; 18	ARA2; 15	ALB; 14	NAV; 20	JER1; 18	JER2; 21	VAL1; 15	VAL2; 22	30th	4

=== FIM CEV Moto2 European Championship ===
==== Races by year ====
(key) (Races in bold indicate pole position, races in italics indicate fastest lap)

Year	Bike	1	2	3	4	5	6	7	8	9	10	11	12	Pos	Pts
2019	Kalex	EST1; 8	EST2; 15	VAL; 10	CAT1; 11	CAT2; 8	ARA1; 13	ARA2; 12	JER	ALB1	ALB2	VAL		15th	35
2020	Kalex	EST1; 9	EST2; 8	POR1; 5	POR2; Ret	JER1; 8	JER2; 8	ARA1; 10	ARA2; 9	ARA3; 8	VAL1; 8	VAL2; 8		7th	79
2021	Kalex	EST1; 3	EST2; 4	VAL; 3	CAT1; Ret	CAT2; 4	POR1; 3	POR2; Ret	ARA1; Ret	ARA2; C	JER1; Ret	JER2; 6	VAL; 4	5th	97

=== Asia Talent Cup ===
==== Races by year ====
(key) (Races in bold indicate pole position; races in italics indicate fastest lap)

Year	Bike	1	2	3		4		5	6		Pos	Pts
Year	Bike	R1	R1	R1	R2	R1	R2	R1	R1	R2	Pos	Pts
2014	Honda	QAT; 7	IDN; 15	CHN1; 6	CHN2; 7	MAL1; 5	MAL2; 3	JAP; Ret	MYS1; 8	MYS2; 5	7th	75

Year	Bike	1	2	3	4	5	6	7	8	9	10	11	12	Pos	Pts
2015	Honda	THA1; 6	THA2; 14	QAT1; 13	QAT2; 5	MAL1; 2	MAL2; Ret	**CHN1**; 11	CHN2; 4	JPN1; 4	JPN2; 13	SEP1; 7	SEP2; 3	8th	105

=== Grand Prix motorcycle racing ===
==== By season ====
Season	Class	Motorcycle	Team	Race	Win	Podium	Pole	FLap	Pts	Plcd
2016	Moto3	Honda	Drive M7 SIC Racing Team	18	0	0	0	0	14	28th
2017	Moto3	Honda	SIC Racing Team	17	0	0	0	1	42	17th
2018	Moto3	Honda	Petronas Sprinta Racing	17	0	0	0	0	46	21st
2019	Moto2	Kalex	Petronas Sprinta Racing	6	0	0	0	0	0	37th
2021	Moto2	Kalex	Petronas Sprinta Racing	1	0	0	0	0	0	NC
Total				**59**	**0**	**0**	**0**	**1**	**102**	

==== By class ====
Class	Seasons	1st GP	Race	Win	Podiums	Pole	FLap	Pts	WChmp
Moto3	2016–2018	2016 Qatar	52	0	0	0	0	102	0
Moto2	2019, 2021	2019 San Marino	7	0	0	0	0	0	0
Total	2016–2019, 2021		**59**	**0**	**0**	**0**	**0**	**102**	**0**

==== Races by year ====
(key) (Races in bold indicate pole position; races in italics indicate fastest lap)

Year	Class	Bike	1	2	3	4	5	6	7	8	9	10	11	12	13	14	15	16	17	18	19	Pos	Pts
2016	Moto3	Honda	QAT; 20	ARG; 11	AME; Ret	SPA; 16	FRA; Ret	ITA; 22	CAT; Ret	NED; 19	GER; Ret	AUT; 23	CZE; Ret	GBR; 23	RSM; 23	ARA; 23	JPN; 12	AUS; 11	MAL; Ret	VAL; 27		28th	14
2017	Moto3	Honda	QAT; 10	ARG; 17	AME; 19	SPA; Ret	FRA; DNS	ITA; 18	CAT; 18	NED; Ret	GER; 13	CZE; 9	AUT; 8	GBR; 12	RSM; Ret	ARA; 15	JPN; Ret	AUS; 8	MAL; 11	VAL; 17		17th	42
2018	Moto3	Honda	QAT; 11	ARG; 5	AME; Ret	SPA; 16	FRA; Ret	ITA; Ret	CAT; 13	NED; 21	GER; 11	CZE; Ret	AUT; 17	GBR; C	RSM; 12	ARA; 8	THA; 15	JPN; 19	AUS; 7	MAL; 23	VAL	21st	46
2019	Moto2	Kalex	QAT	ARG	AME	SPA	FRA	ITA	CAT	NED	GER	CZE	AUT	GBR	RSM; Ret	ARA; DNS	THA; 23	JPN; 22	AUS; 23	MAL; Ret	VAL; 29	37th	0
2021	Moto2	Kalex	QAT	DOH	POR	SPA	FRA	ITA	CAT	GER	NED	STY	AUT	GBR; Ret	ARA	RSM	AME	EMI	ALR	VAL		NC	0

=== Asia Superbike 1000 ===
==== Races by year ====
(key) (Races in bold indicate pole position; races in italics indicate fastest lap)

Year	Bike	1		2		3		4		5		6		Pos	Pts
Year	Bike	R1	R2	R1	R2	R1	R2	R1	R2	R1	R2	R1	R2	Pos	Pts
2022	BMW	CHA; 7	CHA; 7	SEP; 6	SEP; 3	SUG; Ret	SUG; DNS	SEP; 3	SEP; 7	CHA; Ret	CHA; 9			8th	76
2025	Suzuki	CHA	CHA	SEP; 5	SEP; Ret	MOT	MOT	MAN	MAN	SEP	SEP	CHA; 7	CHA; Ret	16th	20
2026	Suzuki	SEP; 9	SEP; 8	CHA	CHA	MOT	MOT	MAN	MAN	SEP; 6	SEP; Ret	CHA	CHA	16th*	25*

=== Supersport World Championship ===
==== Races by year ====
(key) (Races in bold indicate pole position, races in italics indicate fastest lap)

Year	Bike	1	2	3	4	5	6	7	8	9	10	11	12	13	14	15	16	17	18	19	20	21	22	23	24	Pos	Pts
2023	Honda	AUS; 12	AUS; 15	INA; 15	INA; 13	NED; 22	NED; 22	SPA; Ret	SPA; 22	EMI; 21	EMI; Ret	GBR; Ret	GBR; 26	ITA; Ret	ITA; 16	CZE; 21	CZE; 5	FRA; 19	FRA; DNS	SPA	SPA	POR	POR	ARG	ARG	25th	20

=== Superbike World Championship ===
==== Races by year ====
(key) (Races in bold indicate pole position, races in italics indicate fastest lap)

Year	Bike	1			2			3			4			5			6			7			8			9			10			11			12			Pos	Pts
Year	Bike	R1	SR	R2	R1	SR	R2	R1	SR	R2	R1	SR	R2	R1	SR	R2	R1	SR	R2	R1	SR	R2	R1	SR	R2	R1	SR	R2	R1	SR	R2	R1	SR	R2	R1	SR	R2	Pos	Pts
2024	Honda	AUS; 20	AUS; 20	AUS; 19	SPA; 20	SPA; Ret	SPA; 18	NED; 17	NED; Ret	NED; 20	ITA; 20	ITA; 21	ITA; Ret	GBR; 20	GBR; 21	GBR; Ret	CZE	CZE	CZE	POR; WD	POR; WD	POR; WD	FRA	FRA	FRA	ITA	ITA	ITA	SPA; WD	SPA; WD	SPA; WD	POR	POR	POR	SPA	SPA	SPA	29th	0
