= 2024 Supersport World Championship =

Motorsport championship

2024 Supersport World Championship
Previous:	2023	Next:	2025
Support series: Superbike World Championship; Supersport 300 World Championship; Women's Circuit Racing World Championship; Yamaha R3 bLU cRU FIM World Cup

The 2024 Supersport World Championship was the 26th season of the Supersport World Championship. The championship was won by Adrián Huertas.

== Race calendar and results ==
The provisional 2024 season calendar was announced on 26 October 2023. However, on 7 June 2024, it was announced that the Hungarian round at the Balaton Park Circuit was cancelled and replaced by Estoril round at Circuito do Estoril due to the ongoing works at the Balaton Park Circuit.

2024 calendar
Round			Circuit	Date	Superpole	Fastest lap	Winning rider	Winning team	Winning constructor	Ref
1	R1	(Australia) Australian Round	Phillip Island Grand Prix Circuit	24 February	(Spain) Adrián Huertas	(Italy) Yari Montella	(Italy) Yari Montella	(Italy) Barni Spark Racing Team	(Italy) Ducati	
1	R2	(Australia) Australian Round	Phillip Island Grand Prix Circuit	25 February		(Germany) Marcel Schrötter	(Italy) Yari Montella	(Italy) Barni Spark Racing Team	(Italy) Ducati	
2	R1	(Catalonia) Catalunya Round	Circuit de Barcelona-Catalunya	23 March	(Spain) Adrián Huertas	(Spain) Jorge Navarro	(Spain) Adrián Huertas	(Italy) Aruba.it Racing WorldSSP Team	(Italy) Ducati	
2	R2	(Catalonia) Catalunya Round	Circuit de Barcelona-Catalunya	24 March		(Spain) Adrián Huertas	(Italy) Stefano Manzi	(Netherlands) Ten Kate Racing Yamaha	(Japan) Yamaha	
3	R1	(Netherlands) Dutch Round	TT Circuit Assen	20 April	(Italy) Stefano Manzi	(Italy) Federico Caricasulo	(Spain) Adrián Huertas	(Italy) Aruba.it Racing WorldSSP Team	(Italy) Ducati	
3	R2	(Netherlands) Dutch Round	TT Circuit Assen	21 April		(Turkey) Bahattin Sofuoğlu	(Netherlands) Glenn van Straalen	(Netherlands) Ten Kate Racing Yamaha	(Japan) Yamaha	
4	R1	Emilia-Romagna Round	Misano World Circuit Marco Simoncelli	15 June	(Italy) Yari Montella	(Spain) Adrián Huertas	(Spain) Adrián Huertas	(Italy) Aruba.it Racing WorldSSP Team	(Italy) Ducati	
4	R2	Emilia-Romagna Round	Misano World Circuit Marco Simoncelli	16 June		(Spain) Adrián Huertas	(Spain) Adrián Huertas	(Italy) Aruba.it Racing WorldSSP Team	(Italy) Ducati	
5	R1	(United Kingdom) UK Round	Donington Park	13 July	(Spain) Adrián Huertas	(Spain) Adrián Huertas	(Spain) Adrián Huertas	(Italy) Aruba.it Racing WorldSSP Team	(Italy) Ducati	
5	R2	(United Kingdom) UK Round	Donington Park	14 July		(Italy) Yari Montella	(Spain) Adrián Huertas	(Italy) Aruba.it Racing WorldSSP Team	(Italy) Ducati	
6	R1	(Czech Republic) Czech Round	Autodrom Most	20 July	(Italy) Yari Montella	(Italy) Stefano Manzi	(Spain) Adrián Huertas	(Italy) Aruba.it Racing WorldSSP Team	(Italy) Ducati	
6	R2	(Czech Republic) Czech Round	Autodrom Most	21 July		(Italy) Stefano Manzi	(Spain) Adrián Huertas	(Italy) Aruba.it Racing WorldSSP Team	(Italy) Ducati	
7	R1	(Portugal) Portuguese Round	Algarve International Circuit	10 August	(Spain) Adrián Huertas	(Italy) Yari Montella	(Italy) Yari Montella	(Italy) Barni Spark Racing Team	(Italy) Ducati	
7	R2	(Portugal) Portuguese Round	Algarve International Circuit	11 August		(Spain) Adrián Huertas	(Italy) Yari Montella	(Italy) Barni Spark Racing Team	(Italy) Ducati	
8	R1	(France) French Round	Circuit de Nevers Magny-Cours	7 September	(Spain) Adrián Huertas	(Turkey) Can Öncü	(Finland) Niki Tuuli	(Netherlands) EAB Racing Team	(Italy) Ducati	
8	R2	(France) French Round	Circuit de Nevers Magny-Cours	8 September		(Italy) Stefano Manzi	(Italy) Yari Montella	(Italy) Barni Spark Racing Team	(Italy) Ducati	
9	R1	(Italy) Italian Round	Cremona Circuit	21 September	(Spain) Adrián Huertas	(Spain) Adrián Huertas	(Spain) Adrián Huertas	(Italy) Aruba.it Racing WorldSSP Team	(Italy) Ducati	
9	R2	(Italy) Italian Round	Cremona Circuit	22 September		(Italy) Yari Montella	(Italy) Stefano Manzi	(Netherlands) Ten Kate Racing Yamaha	(Japan) Yamaha	
10	R1	(Aragon) Aragón Round	MotorLand Aragón	28 September	(Spain) Adrián Huertas	(Italy) Stefano Manzi	(Spain) Adrián Huertas	(Italy) Aruba.it Racing WorldSSP Team	(Italy) Ducati	
10	R2	(Aragon) Aragón Round	MotorLand Aragón	29 September		(France) Valentin Debise	(Italy) Yari Montella	(Italy) Barni Spark Racing Team	(Italy) Ducati	
11	R1	(Portugal) Estoril Round	Circuito do Estoril	12 October (Note: The Estoril round was added to the calendar on 7 June 2024. It replaced the Hungarian round.)	(Italy) Yari Montella	(Italy) Yari Montella	(Italy) Yari Montella	(Italy) Barni Spark Racing Team	(Italy) Ducati	
11	R2	(Portugal) Estoril Round	Circuito do Estoril	13 October		(Italy) Stefano Manzi	(Italy) Stefano Manzi	(Netherlands) Ten Kate Racing Yamaha	(Japan) Yamaha	
12	R1	(Spain) Spanish Round	Circuito de Jerez	19 October	(Spain) Adrián Huertas	(Italy) Federico Caricasulo	(Italy) Stefano Manzi	(Netherlands) Ten Kate Racing Yamaha	(Japan) Yamaha	
12	R2	(Spain) Spanish Round	Circuito de Jerez	20 October		(Spain) Adrián Huertas	(Italy) Stefano Manzi	(Netherlands) Ten Kate Racing Yamaha	(Japan) Yamaha	
Races under contract to run in 2024, but cancelled:
C		(Hungary) Hungarian Round	Balaton Park Circuit	N/A (Note: The Hungarian round was originally due to take place on 23–25 August 2024. It was cancelled and replaced by the Estoril round.)	—N/a					

== Entry list ==
2024 entry list
Team	Constructor	Motorcycle	No	Rider	Class	Rounds
(Italy) Aruba.it Racing WorldSSP Team	Ducati	Panigale V2	99	(Spain) Adrián Huertas		All
(Italy) Barni Spark Racing Team	Ducati	Panigale V2	55	(Italy) Yari Montella		All
(Italy) D34G Racing	Ducati	Panigale V2	32	(Australia) Oli Bayliss		All
(Italy) D34G Racing	Ducati	Panigale V2	71	(Australia) Tom Edwards	C	2–12
(Netherlands) EAB Racing Team	Ducati	Panigale V2	33	(Spain) Mauro González		12
(Netherlands) EAB Racing Team	Ducati	Panigale V2	66	(Finland) Niki Tuuli		1–11
(Italy) Ecosantagata Althea Racing Team	Ducati	Panigale V2	5	(Italy) Niccolò Antonelli		All
(Italy) Ecosantagata Althea Racing Team	Ducati	Panigale V2	43	(Denmark) Simon Jespersen		12
(Italy) Ecosantagata Althea Racing Team	Ducati	Panigale V2	74	(Poland) Piotr Biesiekirski		2–11
(Spain) Orelac Racing Verdnatura	Ducati	Panigale V2	7	(Italy) Lorenzo Baldassarri		1–3
(Spain) Orelac Racing Verdnatura	Ducati	Panigale V2	9	(Spain) Jorge Navarro		4–12
(Spain) Orelac Racing Verdnatura	Ducati	Panigale V2	22	(Italy) Federico Fuligni	C	2–11
(Spain) Orelac Racing Verdnatura	Ducati	Panigale V2	91	(Italy) Filippo Fuligni	C	12
(Italy) Renzi Corse	Ducati	Panigale V2	40	(Italy) Simone Corsi	C	2–12
(United Kingdom) Rokit Haslam Racing	Ducati	Panigale V2	15	(Republic of Ireland) Eugene McManus		2, 5
(Netherlands) WST WIXX Racing Ducati	Ducati	Panigale V2	96	(Netherlands) Wiljan van Wikselaar		3
(Italy) ZPM Motorsport Racing	Ducati	Panigale V2	31	(Italy) Alessandro Sciarretta		4
CBO Racing Honda France	Honda	CBR600RR	6	(France) Corentin Perolari		8
(Japan) Petronas MIE Honda Racing Team	Honda	CBR600RR	16	(Malaysia) Azroy Hakeem Anuar		10–11
(Japan) Petronas MIE Honda Racing Team	Honda	CBR600RR	27	(Japan) Kaito Toba		All
(Japan) Petronas MIE Honda Racing Team	Honda	CBR600RR	89	(Malaysia) Khairul Idham Pawi		All
(Italy) Kawasaki Puccetti Racing	Kawasaki	ZX-6R	61	(Turkey) Can Öncü		All
(Italy) Prodina Kawasaki Racing	Kawasaki	ZX-6R	19	(Italy) Gabriele Giannini	C	2–7
(Netherlands) Viamo Racing by MTM	Kawasaki	ZX-6R	25	(Switzerland) Marcel Brenner		1–7
(Netherlands) Viamo Racing by MTM	Kawasaki	ZX-6R	26	(France) Guillaume Antiga		8
(Netherlands) Viamo Racing by MTM	Kawasaki	ZX-6R	29	(Mexico) Guillermo Moreno		11–12
(Netherlands) Viamo Racing by MTM	Kawasaki	ZX-6R	52	(Spain) Borja Gómez		9–10
(Italy) Vince64 Racing Team by Puccetti	Kawasaki	ZX-6R	43	(Denmark) Simon Jespersen		4
(Italy) Vince64 Racing Team by Puccetti	Kawasaki	ZX-6R	78	(Japan) Hikari Okubo		1–3
(Italy) Extreme Racing Service	MV Agusta	F3 800 RR	13	(Italy) Luca Ottaviani		4, 9
(Italy) Motozoo ME AIR Racing	MV Agusta	F3 800 RR	64	(Italy) Federico Caricasulo		All
(Italy) Motozoo ME AIR Racing	MV Agusta	F3 800 RR	68	(Australia) Luke Power	C	2–12
(Italy) MV Agusta Corse Clienti	MV Agusta	F3 800 RR	11	(Netherlands) Bo Bendsneyder		11–12
(Italy) MV Agusta Corse Clienti	MV Agusta	F3 800 RR	23	(Germany) Marcel Schrötter		All
(Italy) MV Agusta Corse Clienti	MV Agusta	F3 800 RR	54	(Turkey) Bahattin Sofuoğlu		1–10
(China) QJMotor Factory Racing	QJ Motor	SRK 800	3	(Italy) Raffaele De Rosa	C	2–12
(Czech Republic) Genius Racing Team	Triumph	Street Triple RS 765	92	(Czech Republic) Filip Fiegl		6
(Spain) PS Racing Team	Triumph	Street Triple RS 765	47	(Spain) Joan Díaz Corbella		10
(Spain) PS Racing Team	Triumph	Street Triple RS 765	73	(Italy) Jacopo Cretaro		10, 12
(United Kingdom) PTR Triumph	Triumph	Street Triple RS 765	50	(Czech Republic) Ondřej Vostatek		All
(United Kingdom) PTR Triumph	Triumph	Street Triple RS 765	69	(United Kingdom) Tom Booth-Amos		All
(Czech Republic) WRP-RT Motorsport by SKM	Triumph	Street Triple RS 765	4	(South Africa) Steven Odendaal		10
(Czech Republic) WRP-RT Motorsport by SKM	Triumph	Street Triple RS 765	7	(Italy) Lorenzo Baldassarri		4–7, 11–12
(Czech Republic) WRP-RT Motorsport by SKM	Triumph	Street Triple RS 765	9	(Spain) Jorge Navarro		1–3
(Czech Republic) WRP-RT Motorsport by SKM	Triumph	Street Triple RS 765	10	(Italy) Kevin Calia		9
(Czech Republic) WRP-RT Motorsport by SKM	Triumph	Street Triple RS 765	17	(United Kingdom) John McPhee		All
(Czech Republic) WRP-RT Motorsport by SKM	Triumph	Street Triple RS 765	45	(Belgium) Luca De Vleeschauwer		8
(Italy) Altogo Racing Team	Yamaha	YZF R6	48	(Italy) Lorenzo Dalla Porta		2
(Italy) Evan Bros. WorldSSP Yamaha Team	Yamaha	YZF R6	53	(France) Valentin Debise		All
(Spain) FIFTY Motorsport	Yamaha	YZF R6	37	(Portugal) Gonçalo Ribeiro		11
(France) GMT94 Yamaha	Yamaha	YZF R6	49	(France) Alexy Negrier		8
(France) GMT94 Yamaha	Yamaha	YZF R6	94	(France) Lucas Mahias		All
(Spain) MS Racing	Yamaha	YZF R6	20	(Netherlands) Melvin van der Voort		12
(France) Perles de Fruits Racing Teams CMS	Yamaha	YZF R6	14	(France) Enzo de la Vega		8
(United Kingdom) R&R Racing	Yamaha	YZF R6	12	(United Kingdom) TJ Toms	C	5
(Australia) Stop & Seal Racing	Yamaha	YZF R6	21	(Australia) Tom Toparis	C	1
(Netherlands) Team Apreco	Yamaha	YZF R6	85	(Netherlands) Twan Smits		3
(Italy) Team Prodina AltoGo	Yamaha	YZF R6	77	(Spain) Miquel Pons	C	9–12
(Netherlands) Ten Kate Racing Yamaha	Yamaha	YZF R6	28	(Netherlands) Glenn van Straalen		All
(Netherlands) Ten Kate Racing Yamaha	Yamaha	YZF R6	62	(Italy) Stefano Manzi		All
(Italy) VFT Racing	Yamaha	YZF R6	20	(Netherlands) Melvin Van Der Voort		6
(Italy) VFT Racing	Yamaha	YZF R6	48	(Italy) Lorenzo Dalla Porta		7–9
(Italy) VFT Racing	Yamaha	YZF R6	72	(Spain) Yeray Ruiz		1–5, 10–12
(Czech Republic) WRP Racing	Yamaha	YZF R6	4	(South Africa) Steven Odendaal		6
Yamaha Thailand Racing Team	Yamaha	YZF R6	24	(Japan) Soichiro Minamimoto		6–7
Yamaha Thailand Racing Team	Yamaha	YZF R6	39	(Thailand) Krittapat Keankum		1–5, 10–12
Yamaha Thailand Racing Team	Yamaha	YZF R6	51	(Thailand) Anupab Sarmoon		1–10
Yamaha Thailand Racing Team	Yamaha	YZF R6	54	(Turkey) Bahattin Sofuoğlu		11–12
Yamaha Thailand Racing Team	Yamaha	YZF R6	80	(Spain) Álvaro Díaz		8–9

Key
Regular rider
Wildcard rider
Replacement rider
C WorldSSP Challenge

== Championship standings ==
=== Points ===
Position	**1st**	**2nd**	**3rd**	**4th**	**5th**	**6th**	**7th**	**8th**	**9th**	**10th**	**11th**	**12th**	**13th**	**14th**	**15th**
Points	25	20	16	13	11	10	9	8	7	6	5	4	3	2	1

=== Riders' championship ===
Pos.	Rider	Bike	PHI (Australia)		BAR (Spain)		ASS (Netherlands)		MIS (Italy)		DON (United Kingdom)		MOS (Czech Republic)		POR (Portugal)		MAG (France)		CRE (Italy)		ARA (Spain)		EST (Portugal)		JER (Spain)		Pts.
Pos.	Rider	Bike	R1	R2	R1	R2	R1	R2	R1	R2	R1	R2	R1	R2	R1	R2	R1	R2	R1	R2	R1	R2	R1	R2	R1	R2	Pts.
1	(Spain) Adrián Huertas	Ducati	**Ret**	3	**1**	32	1	2	1	**1**	**1**	**1**	1	1	**2**	12	**4**	3	**1**	**2**	**1**	5	2	2	**3**	4	439
2	(Italy) Stefano Manzi	Yamaha	2	Ret	2	1	**2**	21	3	4	2	4	3	**2**	3	2	Ret	2	2	1	2	**2**	3	1	1	1	415
3	(Italy) Yari Montella	Ducati	1	**1**	4	4	Ret	7	**2**	2	3	2	**4**	3	1	**1**	6	1	3	Ret	4	1	**1**	**Ret**	2	8	382
4	(France) Valentin Debise	Yamaha	Ret	5	5	5	3	18	4	3	5	8	2	4	6	3	10	Ret	21	5	3	4	Ret	3	Ret	2	238
5	(Germany) Marcel Schrötter	MV Agusta	3	2	3	2	12	8	6	6	Ret	11	7	9	7	8	17	10	4	4	11	7	6	10	4	5	228
6	(Spain) Jorge Navarro	Triumph	7	12	7	**7**	7	11																			192
6	(Spain) Jorge Navarro	Ducati							5	5	4	3	18	5	4	25	8	5	Ret	7	5	3	22	9	Ret	6	192
7	(Italy) Federico Caricasulo	MV Agusta	4	4	6	8	6	**22**	7	7	16	15	5	6	5	4	2	Ret	Ret	6	8	9	5	6	24	**Ret**	184
8	(Netherlands) Glenn van Straalen	Yamaha	18	20	14	10	4	1	10	14	12	7	9	7	9	6	3	6	Ret	15	9	10	9	7	11	12	165
9	(France) Lucas Mahias	Yamaha	9	7	Ret	3	9	24	15	Ret	10	10	6	Ret	8	5	31	Ret	6	Ret	6	8	4	4	5	7	155
10	(United Kingdom) Tom Booth-Amos	Triumph	Ret	13	13	15	Ret	16	Ret	10	7	5	8	DNS	23	10	9	4	5	3	Ret	6	15	Ret	6	11	120
11	(Finland) Niki Tuuli	Ducati	17	14	16	NC	Ret	3	9	8	9	6	10	8	10	Ret	1	8	9	10	14	16	Ret	DNS			118
12	(Turkey) Bahattin Sofuoğlu	MV Agusta	6	6	10	6	8	5	Ret	Ret	6	Ret	Ret	Ret	WD	WD	16	Ret	10	11	10	Ret					103
12	(Turkey) Bahattin Sofuoğlu	Yamaha																					10	8	Ret	9	103
13	(Turkey) Can Öncü	Kawasaki	Ret	16	8	9	16	9	Ret	29	15	12	11	10	11	7	5	**9**	22	8	7	11	WD	WD	23	Ret	92
14	(Australia) Oli Bayliss	Ducati	5	10	21	11	20	Ret	8	13	8	9	12	15	Ret	15	11	11	Ret	14	12	14	12	Ret	Ret	16	76
15	(Italy) Simone Corsi	Ducati			20	19	14	13	Ret	11	13	13	Ret	11	13	11	24	18	Ret	12	16	13	7	11	12	10	60
16	(United Kingdom) John McPhee	Triumph	8	8	12	17	11	Ret	Ret	19	21	DNS	20	19	15	9	19	12	7	Ret	20	Ret	WD	WD	8	WD	54
17	(Italy) Niccolò Antonelli	Ducati	Ret	17	9	18	15	4	23	9	19	16	27	18	Ret	13	30	21	Ret	DNS	13	Ret	16	14	9	13	46
18	(Netherlands) Bo Bendsneyder	MV Agusta																					8	5	7	3	44
19	(Australia) Tom Edwards	Ducati			Ret	12	5	25	12	Ret	11	24	Ret	Ret	Ret	17	7	14	11	16	Ret	20	Ret	18	19	Ret	40
20	(Czech Republic) Ondřej Vostatek	Triumph	14	19	22	26	Ret	26	19	27	17	20	13	12	22	20	26	16	8	9	19	17	11	12	17	17	33
21	(Italy) Lorenzo Baldassarri	Ducati	Ret	9	26	16	Ret	DSQ																			28
21	(Italy) Lorenzo Baldassarri	Triumph							14	21	14	14	15	13	12	Ret							Ret	15	10	Ret	28
22	(Spain) Yeray Ruiz	Yamaha	11	11	11	13	DNQ	DNQ	16	16	WD	WD									Ret	24	20	13	13	15	25
23	(Japan) Kaito Toba	Honda	Ret	21	25	25	24	6	26	22	20	Ret	19	Ret	14	Ret	27	13	Ret	27	18	19	14	NC	14	14	21
24	(Thailand) Anupab Sarmoon	Yamaha	12	15	23	22	13	14	Ret	28	22	Ret	Ret	DSQ	17	18	14	19	15	20	WD	WD					13
25	(Italy) Luca Ottaviani	MV Agusta							11	12									Ret	13							12
26	(Poland) Piotr Biesiekirski	Ducati			17	Ret	21	12	18	15	18	17	Ret	Ret	16	16	29	15	17	18	15	18	13	DNS			10
27	(France) Corentin Perolari	Honda															20	7									9
28	(Italy) Lorenzo Dalla Porta	Yamaha			15	14									19	14	12	20	16	21							9
29	(Spain) Borja Gómez	Kawasaki																	12	22	17	12					8
30	(Netherlands) Twan Smits	Yamaha					Ret	10																			6
31	(Australia) Luke Power	MV Agusta			18	20	10	Ret	Ret	20	Ret	18	16	16	18	22	Ret	17	20	23	22	22	Ret	Ret	20	Ret	6
32	(Australia) Tom Toparis	Yamaha	10	18																							6
33	(Spain) Álvaro Díaz	Yamaha															13	22	13	17							6
34	(South Africa) Steven Odendaal	Yamaha											14	14													5
34	(South Africa) Steven Odendaal	Triumph																			Ret	15					5
35	(Italy) Federico Fuligni	Ducati			Ret	24	DNQ	DNQ	13	18	24	DNS	24	22	20	21	21	23	18	19	23	23	WD	WD			3
36	(Switzerland) Marcel Brenner	Kawasaki	13	25	19	27	22	19	25	26	Ret	21	Ret	21	21	DNS											3
37	(Malaysia) Khairul Idham Pawi	Honda	15	23	28	29	23	20	21	24	25	23	22	Ret	Ret	19	15	29	Ret	26	21	26	18	17	15	19	3
38	(Spain) Miquel Pons	Yamaha																	14	Ret	26	Ret	Ret	20	16	18	2
39	(Italy) Gabriele Giannini	Kawasaki			27	21	17	15	Ret	DSQ	Ret	Ret	26	Ret	WD	WD											1
40	(Italy) Raffaele De Rosa	QJ Motor			Ret	31	18	27	24	25	27	22	23	24	Ret	23	23	28	19	25	24	25	17	16	21	22	0
41	(Thailand) Krittapat Keankum	Yamaha	16	22	30	30	19	23	22	Ret	26	DNS									27	27	NC	19	Ret	25	0
42	(Netherlands) Melvin van der Voort	Yamaha											17	17											Ret	DNS	0
43	(Italy) Alessandro Sciarretta	Ducati							17	17																	0
44	(Japan) Hikari Okubo	Kawasaki	Ret	24	24	23	25	17																			0
45	(France) Enzo de la Vega	Yamaha															18	26									0
46	(Mexico) Guillermo Moreno	Kawasaki																					19	22	22	23	0
47	(Republic of Ireland) Eugene McManus	Ducati			29	28					23	19															0
48	(Czech Republic) Filip Fiegl	Triumph											21	20													0
49	(Denmark) Simon Jespersen	Kawasaki							20	23																	0
49	(Denmark) Simon Jespersen	Ducati																							18	20	0
50	(Italy) Jacopo Cretaro	Triumph																			25	21			Ret	21	0
51	(Malaysia) Azroy Hakeem Anuar	Honda																			28	Ret	21	Ret			0
52	(Portugal) Gonçalo Ribeiro	Yamaha																					Ret	21			0
53	(France) Alexy Negrier	Yamaha															22	25									0
54	(Japan) Soichiro Minamimoto	Yamaha											25	23	24	24											0
55	(France) Guillaume Antiga	Kawasaki															25	24									0
56	(Italy) Kevin Calia	Triumph																	Ret	24							0
57	(Italy) Filippo Fuligni	Ducati																							Ret	24	0
58	(Belgium) Luca De Vleeschauwer	Triumph															28	27									0
59	(United Kingdom) TJ Toms	Yamaha									Ret	DNS															0
60	(Spain) Joan Díaz Corbella	Triumph																			Ret	DNS					0
61	(Spain) Mauro González	Ducati																							Ret	DNS	0
62	(Netherlands) Wiljan van Wikselaar	Ducati					DNQ	DNQ																			0

Colour	Result
Gold	Winner
Silver	Second place
Bronze	Third place
Green	Points classification
Blue	Non-points classification
Blue	Non-classified finish (NC)
Purple	Retired, not classified (Ret)
Red	Did not qualify (DNQ)
Red	Did not pre-qualify (DNPQ)
Black	Disqualified (DSQ)
White	Did not start (DNS)
White	Withdrew (WD)
White	Race cancelled (C)
Blank	Did not practice (DNP)
Blank	Did not arrive (DNA)
Blank	Excluded (EX)

**Bold** – Pole position
Italics – Fastest lap

=== Teams' championship ===
Pos.	Teams	Bike No.	PHI (Australia)		BAR (Spain)		ASS (Netherlands)		MIS (Italy)		DON (United Kingdom)		MOS (Czech Republic)		POR (Portugal)		MAG (France)		CRE (Italy)		ARA (Spain)		EST (Portugal)		JER (Spain)		Pts.
Pos.	Teams	Bike No.	R1	R2	R1	R2	R1	R2	R1	R2	R1	R2	R1	R2	R1	R2	R1	R2	R1	R2	R1	R2	R1	R2	R1	R2	Pts.
1	(Netherlands) Ten Kate Racing Yamaha	62	2	Ret	2	1	**2**	21	3	4	2	4	2	**3**	3	2	Ret	2	2	1	2	**2**	3	1	1	1	580
1	(Netherlands) Ten Kate Racing Yamaha	28	18	20	14	10	4	1	10	14	12	7	9	7	9	10	3	6	Ret	15	9	10	9	7	11	12	580
2	(Italy) Aruba.It Racing WorldSSP Team	99	**Ret**	3	**1**	32	1	2	1	**1**	**1**	**1**	1	1	**2**	12	**4**	3	**1**	**2**	**1**	5	2	2	**3**	4	439
3	(Italy) Barni Spark Racing Team	55	1	**1**	4	4	Ret	7	**2**	2	3	2	**4**	3	1	**1**	6	1	3	Ret	4	1	**1**	**Ret**	2	8	382
4	(Italy) MV Agusta Corse Clienti	23	3	2	3	2	12	8	6	6	Ret	11	9	7	7	8	17	10	4	4	11	7	6	10	4	5	354
4	(Italy) MV Agusta Corse Clienti	54	6	6	10	6	8	5	Ret	Ret	6	Ret	Ret	Ret	WD	WD	16	Ret	10	11	10	Ret					354
4	(Italy) MV Agusta Corse Clienti	11																					8	5	7	3	354
5	(Italy) Evan Bros. WorldSSP Team	53	Ret	5	5	5	3	18	4	3	5	8	2	4	6	3	10	Ret	21	5	3	4	Ret	3	Ret	2	238
6	(Italy) Motozoo ME AIR Racing	64	4	4	6	8	6	**22**	7	7	16	15	5	6	5	4	2	Ret	Ret	6	8	9	5	6	24	Ret	190
6	(Italy) Motozoo ME AIR Racing	68			18	20	10	Ret	Ret	20	Ret	18	16	16	18	22	Ret	17	20	23	22	22	Ret	Ret	20	Ret	190
7	(Spain) Orelac Racing Verdnatura	9							5	5	4	3	18	5	4	25	8	5	Ret	7	5	3	22	9	Ret	6	157
7	(Spain) Orelac Racing Verdnatura	7	Ret	9	26	16	Ret	DSQ																			157
7	(Spain) Orelac Racing Verdnatura	22			Ret	24	DNQ	DNQ	13	18	24	DNS	24	22	20	21	21	23	18	19	23	23	WD	WD			157
7	(Spain) Orelac Racing Verdnatura	91																							Ret	24	157
8	(France) GMT94 Yamaha	94	9	7	Ret	3	9	24	15	Ret	10	10	6	Ret	8	5	31	Ret	6	Ret	6	8	4	4	5	7	155
8	(France) GMT94 Yamaha	49															22	25									155
9	(United Kingdom) PTR Triumph	69	Ret	13	13	15	Ret	16	Ret	10	7	5	8	DNS	23	10	9	4	5	3	Ret	6	15	Ret	6	11	153
9	(United Kingdom) PTR Triumph	50	14	19	22	26	Ret	26	19	27	17	20	13	12	22	20	26	16	8	9	19	17	11	12	17	17	153
10	(Czech Republic) WRP - RT Motorsport by SKM	9	7	12	7	**7**	7	11																			121
10	(Czech Republic) WRP - RT Motorsport by SKM	17	8	8	12	17	11	Ret	Ret	19	21	DNS	20	19	15	9	Ret	12	7	Ret	Ret	20	WD	WD			121
10	(Czech Republic) WRP - RT Motorsport by SKM	7							14	21	14	14	15	13	12	Ret							Ret	15	10	Ret	121
10	(Czech Republic) WRP - RT Motorsport by SKM	4																			Ret	15					121
10	(Czech Republic) WRP - RT Motorsport by SKM	45															28	27									121
10	(Czech Republic) WRP - RT Motorsport by SKM	10																	Ret	24							121
11	(Netherlands) EAB Racing Team	66	17	14	16	NC	Ret	3	9	8	9	6	10	8	10	Ret	1	8	9	10	14	16	Ret	DNS			118
11	(Netherlands) EAB Racing Team	33																							Ret	DNS	118
12	(Italy) D34G Racing	32	5	10	21	11	20	Ret	8	13	8	9	12	15	Ret	15	11	11	Ret	14	12	14	12	Ret	Ret	16	116
12	(Italy) D34G Racing	71			Ret	12	5	25	12	Ret	11	24	Ret	Ret	Ret	17	7	14	11	16	Ret	20	Ret	18	19	Ret	116
13	(Italy) Kawasaki Puccetti Racing	61	Ret	16	8	9	16	9	Ret	29	15	12	11	10	11	7	5	**9**	22	8	7	11	WD	WD	23	Ret	92
14	(Italy) Renzi Corse	40			20	19	14	13	Ret	11	13	13	Ret	11	13	11	24	18	Ret	12	16	13	7	11	12	10	60
15	(Italy) Ecosantagata Althea Racing Team	5	Ret	17	9	18	15	4	23	9	19	16	27	18	Ret	13	30	21	Ret	DNS	13	Ret	16	14	9	13	56
15	(Italy) Ecosantagata Althea Racing Team	74			17	Ret	21	12	18	15	18	17	Ret	Ret	16	16	29	15	17	18	15	18	13	DNS			56
15	(Italy) Ecosantagata Althea Racing Team	43																							18	20	56
16	Yamaha Thailand Racing Team	54																					10	8	Ret	9	40
16	Yamaha Thailand Racing Team	51	12	15	23	22	13	14	Ret	28	22	Ret	Ret	DSQ	17	18	14	19	15	20	WD	WD					40
16	Yamaha Thailand Racing Team	80															13	22	13	17							40
16	Yamaha Thailand Racing Team	39	16	22	30	30	19	23	22	Ret	26	DNS									27	27	NC	19	Ret	25	40
16	Yamaha Thailand Racing Team	24											25	23	24	24											40
17	(Italy) VFT Racing	72	11	11	11	13	DNQ	DNQ	16	16	WD	WD									Ret	24	20	13	13	15	31
17	(Italy) VFT Racing	48													19	14	12	20	16	21							31
17	(Italy) VFT Racing	20											17	17													31
18	(Japan) Petronas MIE Honda Racing Team	27	Ret	21	25	25	24	6	26	22	20	Ret	19	Ret	14	Ret	27	13	Ret	27	18	19	14	NC	14	14	24
18	(Japan) Petronas MIE Honda Racing Team	89	15	23	28	29	23	20	21	24	25	23	22	Ret	Ret	19	15	29	Ret	26	21	26	18	17	15	19	24
18	(Japan) Petronas MIE Honda Racing Team	16																			28	Ret	21	Ret			24
19	(Italy) Extreme Racing Service	13							11	12									Ret	13							12
20	(Netherlands) Viamo Racing by MTM	25	13	25	19	27	22	19	25	26	Ret	21	Ret	21	21	DNS											11
20	(Netherlands) Viamo Racing by MTM	52																	12	22	17	12					11
20	(Netherlands) Viamo Racing by MTM	29																					19	22	22	23	11
20	(Netherlands) Viamo Racing by MTM	26															25	24									11
21	CBO Racing Honda France	6															20	7									9
22	(Australia) Stop & Seal Racing	21	10	18																							6
23	(Netherlands) Team Apreco	85					Ret	10																			6
24	(Czech Republic) WRP Racing	4											14	14													4
25	(Italy) Altogo Racing Team	48			15	14																					3
26	(Italy) Prodina Kawasaki Racing	77																	14	Ret	26	Ret	Ret	20	16	18	3
26	(Italy) Prodina Kawasaki Racing	19			27	21	17	15	Ret	DSQ	Ret	Ret	26	Ret	WD	WD											3
27	(China) QJMotor Factory Racing	3			Ret	31	18	27	24	25	27	22	23	24	Ret	23	23	28	19	25	24	25	17	16	21	22	0
28	(Italy) ZPM Motorsport Racing	31							17	17																	0
29	(Italy) Vince64 Racing Team by Puccetti	78	Ret	24	24	23	25	17																			0
29	(Italy) Vince64 Racing Team by Puccetti	43							20	23																	0
30	(France) Perles de Fruits Racing Teams CMS	14															18	26									0
31	(United Kingdom) Rokit Haslam Racing	15			29	28					23	19															0
32	(Spain) PS Racing Team	73																			25	21			Ret	21	0
32	(Spain) PS Racing Team	47																			Ret	DNS					0
33	(Spain) FIFTY Motorsport	37																					Ret	21			0
34	(United Kingdom) R&R Racing	12									Ret	DNS															0
34	(Spain) MS Racing	20																							Ret	DNS	0
35	(Netherlands) WST WIXX Racing Ducati	96					DNQ	DNQ																			0

=== Manufacturers' championship ===
Pos.	Manufacturer	PHI (Australia)		BAR (Spain)		ASS (Netherlands)		MIS (Italy)		DON (United Kingdom)		MOS (Czech Republic)		POR (Portugal)		MAG (France)		CRE (Italy)		ARA (Spain)		EST (Portugal)		JER (Spain)		Pts.
Pos.	Manufacturer	R1	R2	R1	R2	R1	R2	R1	R2	R1	R2	R1	R2	R1	R2	R1	R2	R1	R2	R1	R2	R1	R2	R1	R2	Pts.
1	(Italy) Ducati	1	1	1	4	1	2	1	1	1	1	1	1	1	1	1	1	1	2	1	1	1	2	2	4	556
2	(Japan) Yamaha	2	5	2	1	2	1	3	3	2	4	2	2	3	2	3	2	2	1	2	2	3	1	1	1	474
3	(Italy) MV Agusta	3	2	3	2	6	5	6	6	6	11	5	6	5	4	2	10	4	4	8	7	5	5	4	3	293
4	(United Kingdom) Triumph	7	8	7	7	7	11	14	10	7	5	8	12	12	9	9	4	5	3	19	6	11	12	6	11	181
5	(Japan) Kawasaki	13	16	8	9	16	9	20	23	15	12	11	10	11	7	5	9	12	8	7	11	19	22	22	23	99
6	(Japan) Honda	15	21	25	25	23	6	21	22	20	23	19	Ret	14	19	15	7	Ret	26	18	19	14	17	14	14	29
7	(China) QJ Motor			Ret	31	18	27	24	25	27	22	23	24	Ret	23	23	28	19	25	24	25	17	16	21	22	0
