= Alessandro Zaccone =

Italian motorcycle racer

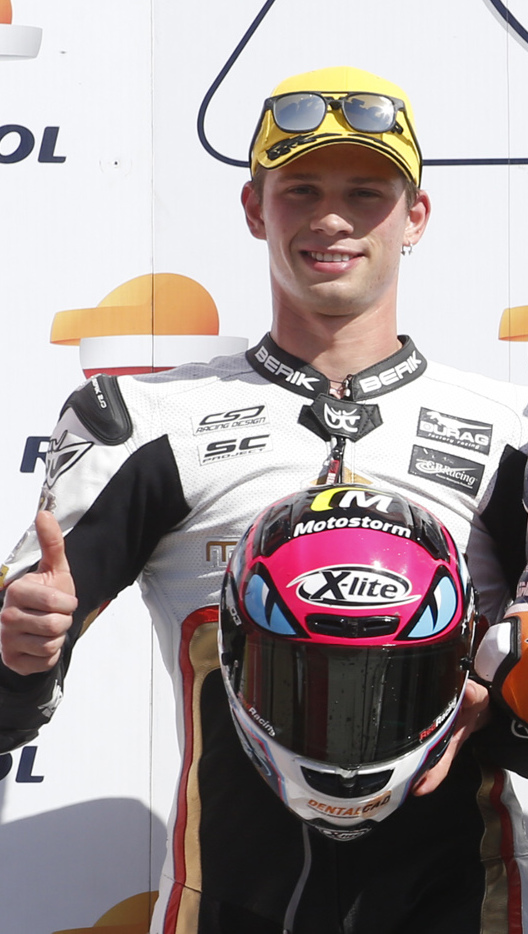
- Zaccone in 2019
- Nationality: Italian
- Born: 16 January 1999 (age 27); Rimini, Italy
- Current team: Ecosantagata Althea Racing Team
- Bike number: 16
Motorcycle racing career statistics
Moto2 World Championship
Active years	2022
Manufacturers	Kalex
2022 championship position	24th (9 pts)
Starts / Wins / Podiums / Poles / F. laps / Points; 20 / 0 / 0 / 0 / 0 / 9
MotoE World Championship
Active years	2020–2021, 2023–2025
Manufacturers	Energica, Ducati
Championships	1 (2025)
2025 championship position	1st (198 pts)
Starts / Wins / Podiums / Poles / F. laps / Points; 58 / 5 / 13 / 8 / 1 / 598
Supersport World Championship
Active years	2016–2017, 2026–
Manufacturers	Kawasaki, MV Agusta, Ducati
Championships	0
2026 championship position	10th (152 points)
Starts / Wins / Podiums / Poles / F. laps / Points; 41 / 1 / 1 / 0 / 0 / 200

Alessandro Zaccone (born 16 January 1999) is an Italian motorcycle racer, competing in the Supersport World Championship for Althea Racing on a Ducati Panigale V2. In Grand Prix motorcycle racing, he won the 2025 MotoE World Championship competing for Aruba Cloud MotoE Racing Team. Zaccone has previously raced in Moto2 in the 2022 season.

== Career ==
=== Early career ===
Zaccone began competing as a child; in 2008, he was regional mini-bike champion and fourth at the national level. In the following years, he continued with the MiniGP and some CIV races in the Moto3 category. He made his international debut in 2013 by participating, with the Honda Italia team, in the Imola Grand Prix of the European Junior Cup. In the same season, he finished in 16th place in the Italian Moto3 championship.

In 2014, Zaccone took part in the last four races on the calendar of the European Superstock 600 Championship with a Honda CBR600RR of the Talmácsi Racing team. He collected sixteen points with which he finished in 20th place in the riders' standings. The following season, he competed in the European Superstock 600 with the same team as in 2014. He finished in 19th scoring 21 points.

=== Supersport World Championship and FIM Moto2 European Championship ===
In 2016, Zaccone, together with Axel Bassani, rode for the San Carlo Team Italia with which he took part in the races in the European section of the Supersport World Championship. Riding a Kawasaki ZX-6R, he finished in third place in the Europe Supersport Cup and 17th overall. In 2017, he moved to the MV Agusta Reparto Corse team with which he competed again for the European Cup of the Supersport World Championship. He scored 17 points with which he finished third in the ESC and 23rd overall.

In the 2018 and 2019, Zaccone competed in the CEV Moto2 class, with the Promoracing team.

=== MotoE and Moto2 World Championship ===
In 2020, Zaccone made his debut in the world championship, racing in the MotoE class with the Trentino Gresini team with Matteo Ferrari as his teammate. He ended the season in 12th place with 37 points.

In 2021, Zaccone moved to the Pramac Racing team, with teammate Yonny Hernández. On 2 May, he obtained his first victory in the category, temporarily taking the lead in the world championship.

In 2022, Zaccone moved up to the Moto2 World Championship, with the Gresini Racing team. He finished the season in 24th place with nine points.

In 2023, Zaccone returned to compete in MotoE by moving to the Tech3 team, with Hikari Okubo as his teammate. He finished all the scheduled races, scoring points, except for the Silverstone round, and finished in eleventh place.

In 2024, Zaccone continued with Tech3 in MotoE, with Nicholas Spinelli as his teammate. He scored three consecutive pole positions and won race two at Assen, finishing the sesason in fifth place.

In 2025, Zaccone became MotoE World Champion after finishing fourth in race 2 of the Portuguese round.

== Career statistics ==
=== Career highlights ===
- 2013 - NC, European Junior Cup, Honda CBR500R
- 2014 - 20th, European Superstock 600 Championship #61 Honda CBR600RR
- 2015 - 19th, European Superstock 600 Championship #61 Honda CBR600RR

=== FIM European Superstock 600 ===
==== Races by year ====
(key) (Races in bold indicate pole position, races in italics indicate fastest lap)

Year	Bike	1	2	3	4	5	6	7	8	Pos	Pts
2014	Honda	SPA	NED	IMO	ITA; 7	POR; 9	SPA; 20	FRA; Ret		20th	16
2015	Honda	SPA; 16	SPA; 16	NED; 14	ITA; Ret	POR	ITA; 10	SPA; 8	FRA; 11	19th	21

=== Supersport World Championship ===
==== Races by year ====
(key) (Races in bold indicate pole position; races in italics indicate fastest lap)

Year	Bike	1	2	3	4	5	6	7	8	9	10	11	12	Pos	Pts
2016	Kawasaki	AUS	THA	SPA; 5	NED; 19	ITA; 5	MAL	GBR; 12	ITA; Ret	GER; Ret	FRA; Ret	SPA; 11	QAT	18th	31
2017	MV Agusta	AUS	THA	SPA; Ret	NED; 18	ITA; 10	GBR; Ret	ITA; 11	GER; 14	POR; Ret	FRA; Ret	SPA; 12	QAT	23rd	17

Year	Bike	1		2		3		4		5		6		7		8		9		10		11		12		Pos	Pts
Year	Bike	R1	R2	R1	R2	R1	R2	R1	R2	R1	R2	R1	R2	R1	R2	R1	R2	R1	R2	R1	R2	R1	R2	R1	R2	Pos	Pts
2026	Ducati	AUS; 8	AUS; 7	POR; 8	POR; 10	NED; 8	NED; 5	HUN; Ret	HUN; 13	CZE; 10	CZE; 6	ARA; 1	ARA; 13	EMI; 5	EMI; 14	GBR; 11	GBR; 12	FRA; 19	FRA; 12	ITA; Ret	ITA; 16	EST; 8	EST; 11	SPA; 9	SPA; 6	10th	152

=== FIM CEV Moto2 European Championship ===
==== Races by year ====
(key) (Races in bold indicate pole position; races in italics indicate fastest lap)

Year	Bike	1	2	3	4	5	6	7	8	9	10	11	Pos	Pts
2018	Kalex	EST1; 6	EST2; Ret	VAL; 7	CAT1; 14	CAT2; 9	ARA1; 9	ARA2; 8	JER; 6	ALB1; 10	ALB2; 11	VAL; 4	10th	74.5
2019	Kalex	EST1; 5	EST2; 1	VAL; 8	CAT1; Ret	CAT2; 4	ARA1; 7	ARA2; 4	JER; 3	ALB1; 5	ALB2; 2	VAL; 5	3rd	137
2020	Kalex	EST1; 4	EST2; 3	POR1; 3	POR2; 3	JER1; 2	JER2; 9	**ARA1**; 1	**ARA2**; 1	**ARA3**; 3	VAL1; 1	VAL2; 3	3rd	195

=== Grand Prix motorcycle racing ===
==== By season ====
Season	Class	Motorcycle	Team	Race	Win	Podium	Pole	FLap	Pts	Plcd
2020	MotoE	Energica	Trentino Gresini MotoE	6	0	0	0	0	37	12th
2021	MotoE	Energica	Octo Pramac MotoE	6	1	3	0	0	80	5th
2022	Moto2	Kalex	Gresini Racing Moto2	20	0	0	0	0	9	24th
2023	MotoE	Ducati V21L	Tech3 E-Racing	16	0	0	0	0	104	11th
2024	MotoE	Ducati V21L	Tech3 E-Racing	15	1	5	6	3	179	5th
2025	MotoE	Ducati V21L	Aruba Cloud MotoE Racing Team	14	3	5	2	1	198	**1st**
Total				**78**	**5**	**13**	**8**	**4**	**607**	

==== By class ====
Class	Seasons	1st GP	1st Pod	1st Win	Race	Win	Podiums	Pole	FLap	Pts	WChmp
MotoE	2020–2021, 2023–2025	2020 Andalusia	2021 Spain	2021 Spain	58	5	14	8	4	598	1
Moto2	2022	2022 Qatar			20	0	0	0	0	9	0
Total	2020–2025				**78**	**5**	**13**	**8**	**4**	**607**	**1**

==== Races by year ====
(key) (Races in bold indicate pole position, races in italics indicate fastest lap)

Year	Class	Bike	1	2	3	4	5	6	7	8	9	10	11	12	13	14	15	16	17	18	19	20	Pos	Pts
2020	MotoE	Energica	SPA; WD	ANC; Ret	RSM; 7	EMI1; 10	EMI2; 5	FRA1; 9	FRA2; 12														12th	37
2021	MotoE	Energica	SPA; 1	FRA; 3	CAT; 4	NED; 3	AUT; 6	RSM1; Ret	RSM2; DNS														5th	80
2022	Moto2	Kalex	QAT; 22	INA; 24	ARG; Ret	AME; Ret	POR; 15	SPA; 11	FRA; 18	ITA; 19	CAT; Ret	GER; 19	NED; Ret	GBR; 18	AUT; Ret	RSM; 15	ARA; 14	JPN; Ret	THA; 21	AUS; 16	MAL; Ret	VAL; 16	24th	9
2023	MotoE	Ducati	FRA1; 8	FRA2; 9	ITA1; 11	ITA2; 9	GER1; 5	GER2; 9	NED1; 12	NED2; 7	GBR1; Ret	GBR2; Ret	AUT1; 7	AUT2; 11	CAT1; 9	CAT2; 8	RSM1; 7	RSM2; 10					11th	104
2024	MotoE	Ducati	POR1; Ret	POR2; 12	FRA1; Ret	FRA2; 4	CAT1; 5	CAT2; 3	**ITA1**; 2	**ITA2**; 6	**NED1**; DSQ	**NED2**; 1	**GER1**; 2	**GER2**; 5	AUT1; 6	AUT2; 5	RSM1; 2	RSM2; 8					5th	179
2025	MotoE	Ducati	**FRA1**; 3	**FRA2**; Ret	NED1; 2	NED2; 1	AUT1; 7	AUT2; 6	HUN1; 5	HUN2; 6	CAT1; 4	CAT2; 8	RSM1; 1	RSM2; 4	**POR1**; 1	**POR2**; 4							1st	198
