= Piotr Biesiekirski =

Polish motorcycle racer (born 2001)

- Nationality: Polish
- Born: 25 September 2001 (age 25); Warsaw, Poland
- Current team: Team Flembbo - Pilote Moto Production
- Bike number: 74
Motorcycle racing career statistics
Moto2 World Championship
Active years	2020–2022
Manufacturers	NTS, Kalex
Championships	0
2022 championship position	42nd (0 pts)
Starts / Wins / Podiums / Poles / F. laps / Points; 12 / 0 / 0 / 0 / 0 / 0
Supersport World Championship
Active years	2024–2025
Manufacturers	Ducati (2024); MV Agusta (2025)
2025 championship position	27th (0 pts)
Starts / Wins / Podiums / Poles / F. laps / Points; 25 / 0 / 0 / 0 / 0 / 10

Piotr Biesiekirski (born 25 September 2001) is a Polish motorcycle racer. He is the first Polish racer to compete in the FIM CEV Moto2 European Championship, where he made his debut in the 2018 Aragón round.

In 2016, Biesiekirski won the Polish Moto3 Cup. In addition, Biesiekirski has raced in the Spanish Open 600 Championship and PreMoto3 Spain.

== Career statistics ==
=== Career highlights ===
- 2016: 1st, Polish Moto3 Cup
- 2017: 1st, Gymkhana LEM Series

=== FIM CEV Moto2 Championship ===
==== Races by year ====
(key) (Races in bold indicate pole position) (Races in italics indicate fastest lap)

Year	Bike	1	2	3	4	5	6	7	8	9	10	11	12	Pos	Pts
2018	Kalex	EST1	EST2	VAL	CAT1	CAT2	ARA1; 11	ARA2; 11	JER; Ret	ALB1	ALB2	VAL; 7		17th	19
2019	Kalex	EST1	EST2	VAL; DNS	CAT1; 15	CAT2; 14	ARA1; DNS	ARA2; Ret	JER; 11	ALB1; 11	ALB2; 8	VAL; 15		18th	22
2020	Kalex	EST1; 5	EST2; 7	POR1; Ret	POR2; 6	JER1; 7	JER2; 6	ARA1	ARA2	ARA3	VAL1	VAL2		12th	49
2021	Kalex	EST1; 5	EST2; Ret	VAL; Ret	CAT1; 5	CAT2; Ret	POR1; WD	POR2; WD	ARA1; 8	ARA2; C	JER1; 9	JER2; 11	VAL	13th	42
2022	Kalex	EST; Ret	EST; DNS	VAL; 8	CAT; Ret	CAT; 7	JER; 9	POR; 6	POR; 7	ARA; 10	ARA; 9	VAL; 10		9th	62
2023	Kalex	EST1; WD	EST2; WD	VAL1	JER1; 14	JER2; Ret	POR1; 6	POR2; 9	ARA1; 7	ARA2; Ret	ARA3; Ret	VAL2; 7		15th	37

=== Grand Prix motorcycle racing ===
==== By season ====
Season	Class	Motorcycle	Team	Race	Win	Podium	Pole	FLap	Pts	Plcd
2020	Moto2	NTS	NTS RW Racing GP	7	0	0	0	0	0	32nd
2021	Moto2	Kalex	Pertamina Mandalika SAG Euvic	3	0	0	0	0	0	41st
2022	Moto2	Kalex	Pertamina Mandalika SAG Team	2	0	0	0	0	0	42nd
Total				**12**	**0**	**0**	**0**	**0**	**0**	

==== By class ====
Class	Seasons	1st GP	1st Pod	1st Win	Race	Win	Podiums	Pole	FLap	Pts	WChmp
Moto2	2020–2022	2020 Emilia Romagna			12	0	0	0	0	0	0
Total	2020–2022				**12**	**0**	**0**	**0**	**0**	**0**	**0**

==== Races by year ====
(key) (Races in bold indicate pole position; races in italics indicate fastest lap)

Year	Class	Bike	1	2	3	4	5	6	7	8	9	10	11	12	13	14	15	16	17	18	19	20	Pos	Pts
2020	Moto2	NTS	QAT	SPA	ANC	CZE	AUT	STY	RSM	EMI; Ret	CAT; 21	FRA; 22	ARA; 26	TER; 23	EUR; 22	VAL; 21	POR						32nd	0
2021	Moto2	Kalex	QAT	DOH	POR	SPA	FRA	ITA	CAT; 25	GER	NED	STY	AUT	GBR	ARA; Ret	RSM	AME	EMI	ALR; 25	VAL			41st	0
2022	Moto2	Kalex	QAT	INA	ARG	AME	POR	SPA	FRA	ITA	CAT; 23	GER	NED	GBR; 24	AUT	RSM	ARA	JPN	THA	AUS	MAL	VAL	42nd	0

=== Supersport World Championship ===
==== Races by year ====
(key) (Races in bold indicate pole position, races in italics indicate fastest lap)

Year	Bike	1		2		3		4		5		6		7		8		9		10		11		12		Pos	Pts
Year	Bike	R1	R2	R1	R2	R1	R2	R1	R2	R1	R2	R1	R2	R1	R2	R1	R2	R1	R2	R1	R2	R1	R2	R1	R2	Pos	Pts
2024	Ducati	AUS	AUS	SPA; 17	SPA; Ret	NED; 21	NED; 12	ITA; 18	ITA; 15	GBR; 18	GBR; 17	CZE; Ret	CZE; Ret	POR; 16	POR; 16	FRA; 29	FRA; 15	ITA; 17	ITA; 18	SPA; 15	SPA; 18	POR; 13	POR; DNS	SPA	SPA	26th	10
2025	MV Agusta	AUS	AUS	POR	POR	NED	NED	ITA	ITA	CZE	CZE	EMI; 26	EMI; 21	GBR; 23	GBR; 24	HUN; 17	HUN; Ret	FRA	FRA	ARA	ARA	POR	POR	SPA	SPA	37th	0
