= 2020 FIM CEV Moto2 European Championship =

2020 FIM CEV Moto2 European Championship
Previous:	2019	Next:	2021
Support series: FIM CEV Moto3 Junior World Championship; European Talent Cup

The 2020 FIM CEV Moto2 European Championship was the eleventh CEV Moto2 season and the fifth under the FIM banner.

== Calendar ==
The calendar was published in November 2019; a revised schedule was released on 16 June 2020 due to delays caused by the COVID-19 pandemic.

Round	Date	Circuit	Pole position	Fastest lap	Race winner	Winning constructor	STK 600 Winner
1	7 July	(Portugal) Estoril	(Finland) Niki Tuuli (Note: Yari Montella was fastest in qualifying, but received a six place grid penalty, meaning Niki Tuuli started Race 1 from pole position.)	(Italy) Yari Montella	(Italy) Yari Montella	(Italy) Speed Up	(Spain) Fermín Aldeguer
1	7 July	(Portugal) Estoril	(Italy) Yari Montella	(Finland) Niki Tuuli	(Italy) Yari Montella	(Italy) Speed Up	(Spain) Fermín Aldeguer
2	13 July	(Portugal) Portimão	(Italy) Yari Montella	(Italy) Yari Montella	(Italy) Yari Montella	(Italy) Speed Up	(Spain) Fermín Aldeguer
2	13 July	(Portugal) Portimão	(Italy) Yari Montella	(Italy) Yari Montella	(Italy) Yari Montella	(Italy) Speed Up	(Spain) Fermín Aldeguer
3	29 August	(Spain) Jerez	(Italy) Yari Montella	(Italy) Yari Montella	(Italy) Yari Montella	(Italy) Speed Up	(Spain) Fermín Aldeguer
4	30 August	(Spain) Jerez	(Italy) Yari Montella	(Italy) Yari Montella	(Italy) Yari Montella	(Italy) Speed Up	(Spain) Fermín Aldeguer
5	3 October	(Spain) Aragón	(Italy) Alessandro Zaccone	(Italy) Alessandro Zaccone	(Italy) Alessandro Zaccone	(Germany) Kalex	(Spain) Álex Toledo
6	4 October	(Spain) Aragón	(Italy) Alessandro Zaccone	(Andorra) Xavier Cardelús	(Italy) Alessandro Zaccone	(Germany) Kalex	(Spain) Álex Toledo
6	4 October	(Spain) Aragón	(Italy) Alessandro Zaccone	(Italy) Yari Montella	(Italy) Yari Montella	(Italy) Speed Up	(Spain) Álex Toledo
7	31 October	(Spain) Valencia	(Finland) Niki Tuuli	(Italy) Alessandro Zaccone	(Italy) Alessandro Zaccone	(Germany) Kalex	(United Kingdom) Fenton Seabright
8	1 November	(Spain) Valencia	(Finland) Niki Tuuli	(Italy) Alessandro Zaccone	(Italy) Yari Montella	(Italy) Speed Up	(Spain) Fermín Aldeguer

=== Calendar changes ===
- The round at Albacete was replaced with a round at Portimão.
- The round at Barcelona was dropped due to the COVID-19 pandemic.

== Entry list ==
Team	Constructor	No.	Rider	Rounds
Moto2
(Germany) Kiefer Racing	Kalex	3	(Germany) Lukas Tulovic	1–4, 7–8
(United Kingdom) Kovara/RS Racing	Kalex	4	(United Kingdom) Jake Archer	1–2
(United Kingdom) Kovara/RS Racing	Kalex	11	(United Kingdom) Kyle Smith	1
(Spain) APEX - Cardoso Racing	Kalex	5	(Spain) Alejandro Medina	1–6
(Malaysia) Liqui Moly Intact SIC Junior Team	Kalex	7	(Malaysia) Adam Norrodin	All
(Malaysia) Liqui Moly Intact SIC Junior Team	Kalex	77	(Switzerland) Dominique Aegerter	7–8
(Italy) VR46 Master Camp Team	Kalex	9	(Thailand) Keminth Kubo	3–8
(Italy) VR46 Master Camp Team	Kalex	26	(Thailand) Peerapong Boonlert	3–8
(Spain) EasyRace Team	Kalex	13	(Italy) Mattia Rato	All
(Spain) EasyRace Team	Kalex	70	(Japan) Takeshi Ishizuka	All
(Spain) Team Stylobike	Kalex	18	(Andorra) Xavier Cardelús	All
(Spain) Team Stylobike	Kalex	66	(Finland) Niki Tuuli	All
(Spain) Team Stylobike Euvic Good Racing	Kalex	74	(Poland) Piotr Biesiekirski	1–4
(Spain) AGR Team	Kalex	23	(Japan) Taiga Hada	All
(Spain) AGR Team	Kalex	35	(United Kingdom) Sam Wilford	5–8
(Spain) Promo Racing	Kalex	25	(Switzerland) Marcel Brenner	3–4
(Spain) Promo Racing	Kalex	61	(Italy) Alessandro Zaccone	All
(United Kingdom) IDWE Racing	Kalex	35	(United Kingdom) Sam Wilford	1–4
(Germany) Redding-Pinamoto RS	Suter	44	(Germany) Kevin Orgis	All
(Italy) Team Ciatti - Speed Up	Speed Up	55	(Italy) Yari Montella	All
(Spain) Bultaco Racing	Bultaco	59	(Spain) Marc Luna	5–8
(Spain) SF Racing	Kalex	88	(Italy) Alessandro Zetti	1–6
(United Kingdom) Nykos Racing	Nykos	97	(United States) Connor Funk	1–6
Superstock 600
(Germany) Redding-Pinamoto RS	Yamaha	12	(United Kingdom) Jamie Davis	3–4
(Germany) Redding-Pinamoto RS	Yamaha	19	(Austria) Andreas Kofler	All
(Germany) Redding-Pinamoto RS	Yamaha	45	(Germany) Leon Orgis	All
(Germany) H43Team Nobby Talasur-Blumaq	Yamaha	48	(Spain) Joan Díaz	1–4
(Germany) H43Team Nobby Talasur-Blumaq	Yamaha	86	(Germany) Nicolas Chris Czyba	All
(Spain) FAU 55 Tey Racing	Yamaha	47	(United Kingdom) Fenton Seabright	7–8
(Spain) FAU 55 Tey Racing	Yamaha	54	(Spain) Fermín Aldeguer	All
(Spain) EasyRace Team	Yamaha	56	(Spain) Álex Toledo	All
Entry lists:

== Championship standings ==
Scoring system

Points were awarded to the top fifteen finishers. A rider had to finish the race to earn points.

Position	**1st**	**2nd**	**3rd**	**4th**	**5th**	**6th**	**7th**	**8th**	**9th**	**10th**	**11th**	**12th**	**13th**	**14th**	**15th**
Points	25	20	16	13	11	10	9	8	7	6	5	4	3	2	1

=== Riders' championship ===
Pos.	Rider	Bike	EST (Portugal)		POR (Portugal)		JER (Spain)		ARA (Spain)			VAL (Spain)		Points
Moto2
1	(Italy) Yari Montella	Speed Up	1	**1**	**1**	**1**	**1**	**1**	2	Ret	1	2	1	240
2	(Finland) Niki Tuuli	Kalex	**2**	2	2	2	3	2	3	2	2	**5**	**4**	196
3	(Italy) Alessandro Zaccone	Kalex	4	3	3	3	2	9	**1**	**1**	**3**	1	3	195
4	(Japan) Taiga Hada	Kalex	8	6	6	7	4	4	7	4	Ret	7	6	104
5	(Spain) Alejandro Medina	Kalex	6	4	4	4	5	3	5	Ret	5			98
6	(Andorra) Xavier Cardelús	Kalex	7	5	Ret	5	10	Ret	6	3	Ret	4	5	87
7	(Malaysia) Adam Norrodin	Kalex	9	8	5	Ret	8	8	10	9	8	8	8	79
8	(Spain) Álex Toledo	Yamaha	13	10	8	10	15	11	8	7	6	16	9	63
9	(Thailand) Keminth Kubo	Kalex					Ret	5	4	5	4	6	13	61
10	(Spain) Fermín Aldeguer	Yamaha	10	9	7	8	11	10	12	17	11	14	7	61
11	(United Kingdom) Sam Wilford	Kalex	12	12	10	11	14	15	11	8	7	11	14	51
12	(Poland) Piotr Biesiekirski	Kalex	5	7	Ret	6	7	6						49
13	(Italy) Mattia Rato	Kalex	11	13	9	12	16	12	13	10	10	12	11	47
14	(Germany) Lukas Tulovic	Kalex	3	Ret	Ret	9	6	7				Ret	12	46
15	(Japan) Takeshi Ishizuka	Kalex	15	11	12	13	13	13	14	11	9	10	10	45
16	(Switzerland) Dominique Aegerter	Kalex										3	2	36
17	(Thailand) Peerapong Boonlert	Kalex					12	Ret	9	6	Ret	9	Ret	28
18	(Italy) Alessandro Zetti	Kalex	19	15	11	14	17	16	15	14	14			13
19	(Germany) Leon Orgis	Yamaha	18	17	15	17	18	18	Ret	13	12	15	Ret	9
20	(Switzerland) Marcel Brenner	Kalex					9	Ret						7
21	(Spain) Marc Luna	Bultaco							Ret	12	13	19	16	7
22	(Germany) Kevin Orgis	Suter	14	Ret	14	20	19	14	16	Ret	17	WD	WD	6
23	(Spain) Joan Díaz	Yamaha	Ret	14	13	19								5
24	(United Kingdom) Fenton Seabright	Yamaha										13	15	4
25	(Germany) Nicolas Chris Czyba	Yamaha	16	Ret	Ret	15	21	17	Ret	16	15	17	Ret	2
26	(Austria) Andreas Kofler	Yamaha	20	Ret	17	18	20	Ret	17	15	16	18	17	1
	(United Kingdom) Jake Archer	Kalex	17	16	16	16								0
	(United States) Connor Funk	Nykos	DNQ	DNQ	18	21	22	19	18	Ret	DNS			0
	(United Kingdom) Jamie Davis	Yamaha					23	Ret						0
	(United Kingdom) Kyle Smith	Kalex	Ret	DNS										0
Superstock 600
1	(Spain) Fermín Aldeguer	Yamaha	1	1	1	1	1	1	2	5	2	2	1	246
2	(Spain) Álex Toledo	Yamaha	2	2	2	2	2	2	1	1	1	4	2	228
3	(Germany) Leon Orgis	Yamaha	4	4	4	4	4	4	Ret	2	3	3	Ret	133
4	(Austria) Andreas Kofler	Yamaha	5	Ret	5	5	3	Ret	3	3	5	6	4	112
5	(Germany) Nicolas Chris Czyba	Yamaha	3	Ret	Ret	3	5	3	Ret	4	4	5	Ret	96
6	(Spain) Joan Díaz	Yamaha	Ret	3	3	6								42
7	(United Kingdom) Fenton Seabright	Yamaha										1	3	41
8	(United Kingdom) Jamie Davis	Yamaha					6	Ret						10
Pos.	Rider	Bike	EST (Portugal)		POR (Portugal)		JER (Spain)		ARA (Spain)			VAL (Spain)		Points

Colour	Result
Gold	Winner
Silver	Second place
Bronze	Third place
Green	Points classification
Blue	Non-points classification
Blue	Non-classified finish (NC)
Purple	Retired, not classified (Ret)
Red	Did not qualify (DNQ)
Red	Did not pre-qualify (DNPQ)
Black	Disqualified (DSQ)
White	Did not start (DNS)
White	Withdrew (WD)
White	Race cancelled (C)
Blank	Did not practice (DNP)
Blank	Did not arrive (DNA)
Blank	Excluded (EX)

**Bold** – Pole position
Italics – Fastest lap

=== Constructors' championship ===
Pos.	Constructor	EST (Portugal)		POR (Portugal)		JER (Spain)		ARA (Spain)			VAL (Spain)		Points
Moto2
1	(Italy) Speed Up	1	1	1	1	1	1	2	Ret	1	2	1	240
2	(Germany) Kalex	2	2	2	2	2	2	1	1	2	1	2	235
3	(Switzerland) Suter	14	Ret	11	14	16	12	14	Ret	12	WD	WD	19
4	(Spain) Bultaco							Ret	11	10	13	13	17
5	(United Kingdom) Nykos	DNQ	DNQ	13	15	17	15	15	Ret	DNS			6
Superstock 600
1	(Japan) Yamaha	1	1	1	1	1	1	1	1	1	1	1	275
Pos.	Constructor	EST (Portugal)		POR (Portugal)		JER (Spain)		ARA (Spain)			VAL (Spain)		Points
