= Adrián Huertas =

Spanish motorcycle road racer (born 2003)

- Nationality: Spanish
- Born: 21 August 2003 (age 23); Madrid, Spain
- Current team: Italtrans Racing Team
- Bike number: 99
Motorcycle racing career statistics
Moto2 World Championship
Active years	2025–
Manufacturers	Kalex
2025 championship position	21st (27 pts)
Starts / Wins / Podiums / Poles / F. laps / Points; 38 / 0 / 0 / 0 / 0 / 83
Supersport World Championship
Active years	2022–2024
Manufacturers	Kawasaki, Ducati
Championships	1 (2024)
2024 championship position	1st (439 pts)
Starts / Wins / Podiums / Poles / F. laps / Points; 68 / 10 / 18 / 8 / 7 / 693
Supersport 300 World Championship
Active years	2020–2021
Manufacturers	Yamaha, Kawasaki
Championships	1 (2021)
2021 championship position	1st (255 pts)
Starts / Wins / Podiums / Poles / F. laps / Points; 26 / 6 / 8 / 3 / 1 / 299

Adrián Huertas del Olmo (born 21 August 2003) is a Spanish professional motorcycle racer riding in the Moto2 World Championship for Italtrans Racing Team.

Huertas is the champion of the 2024 Supersport World Championship with Ducati. He previously competed in the Supersport 300 World Championship for MTM Kawasaki, winning the championship with the team in 2021.

== Career ==
=== Moto2 World Championship (2025–) ===
==== Italtrans Racing Team (2025–2026) ====
Huertas switched to the Moto2 World Championship in 2025 with the Italtrans Racing Team, partnering Diogo Moreira. He continued with the team in 2026, this time alongside Daniel Muñoz.

==== KLINT Racing Team (2027) ====
Huertas switched to a Forward bike in 2027, driving for the KLINT Racing Team.

== Career statistics ==
=== European Talent Cup ===
==== Races by year ====
(key) (Races in bold indicate pole position; races in italics indicate fastest lap)

Year	Bike	1	2	3	4	5	6	7	8	9	10	11	Pos	Pts
2018	Honda	EST1; DNS	EST2; DNS	VAL1; Ret	VAL2; 17	CAT; 12	ARA1	ARA2	JER1; 20	JER2; 22	ALB; Ret	VAL; 15	30th	5
2019	Honda	EST	EST	VAL	VAL	CAT	ARA	ARA	JER	JER	ALB	VAL; 9	28th	7

=== FIM CEV Moto3 Junior World Championship ===
==== Races by year ====
(key) (Races in bold indicate pole position, races in italics indicate fastest lap)

Year	Bike	1	2	3	4	5	6	7	8	9	10	11	12	Pos	Pts
2018	KTM	EST	VAL1	VAL2	FRA	CAT1	CAT2	ARA; 18	JER1	JER2	ALB	VAL1	VAL2	NC	0

=== Red Bull MotoGP Rookies Cup ===
==== Races by year ====
(key) (Races in bold indicate pole position; races in italics indicate fastest lap)

Year	1	2	3	4	5	6	7	8	9	10	11	12	Pos	Pts
2018	JER1; 14	JER2; 10	ITA; 7	ASS; 10	ASS; 9	GER1; 10	GER2; 10	AUT; DNS	AUT; DNS	MIS; 13	ARA; 15	ARA; 15	12th	47
2019	JER1; DNS	JER2; DNS	MUG; 9	ASS1	ASS2	SAC1	SAC2	RBR1; 16	RBR2; 4	MIS	ARA1	ARA2	20th	20

=== Supersport 300 World Championship ===
==== Races by year ====
(key) (Races in bold indicate pole position; races in italics indicate fastest lap)

Year	Bike	1	2	3	4	5	6	7	8	9	10	11	12	13	14	15	16	Pos	Pts
2020	Yamaha	SPA	SPA	POR	POR	SPA; 11	SPA; Ret	SPA; 8	SPA; 11	SPA; 28	SPA; 9	FRA; 13	FRA; 6	POR; 16	POR; 10			17th	44
2021	Kawasaki	SPA; 1	SPA; 3	ITA; 1	ITA; 10	NED; 1	NED; 5	CZE; 6	CZE; 5	**FRA**; 1	**FRA**; 1	SPA; 7	SPA; 4	**SPA**; 7	**SPA**; Ret	**POR**; 2	**POR**; 1	1st	255

=== Supersport World Championship ===
==== Races by year ====
(key) (Races in bold indicate pole position; races in italics indicate fastest lap)

Year	Bike	1		2		3		4		5		6		7		8		9		10		11		12		Pos	Pts
Year	Bike	R1	R2	R1	R2	R1	R2	R1	R2	R1	R2	R1	R2	R1	R2	R1	R2	R1	R2	R1	R2	R1	R2	R1	R2	Pos	Pts
2022	Kawasaki	SPA; 9	SPA; 11	NED; 11	NED; Ret	POR; 8	POR; 7	ITA; 10	ITA; 15	GBR; 18	GBR; 7	CZE; 8	CZE; 7	FRA; 8	FRA; 12	SPA; 7	SPA; 10	POR; Ret	POR; DNS	ARG; Ret	ARG; 10	INA; 10	INA; 12	AUS; 10	AUS; 12	12th	120
2023	Kawasaki	AUS; Ret	AUS; DNS	INA	INA	NED; 13	NED; 8	SPA; 12	SPA; 12	EMI; 11	EMI; 5	GBR; 6	GBR; 4	ITA; 10	ITA; 4	CZE; 5	CZE; 15	FRA; 4	FRA; 7	SPA; Ret	SPA; Ret	POR; Ret	POR; Ret	JER; 6	JER; 4	12th	134
2024	Ducati	**AUS**; Ret	AUS; 3	**SPA**; 1	SPA; 32	NED; 1	NED; 2	ITA; 1	ITA; 1	**GBR**; 1	GBR; 1	CZE; 1	CZE; 1	**POR**; 2	POR; 12	**FRA**; 4	FRA; 3	**ITA**; 1	ITA; 2	**SPA**; 1	SPA; 5	POR; 2	POR; 2	**SPA**; 3	SPA; 4	1st	439

=== Grand Prix motorcycle racing ===
==== By season ====
Season	Class	Motorcycle	Team	Race	Win	Podium	Pole	FLap	Pts	Plcd
2025	Moto2	Kalex	Italtrans Racing Team	20	0	0	0	0	27	21st
2026	Moto2	Kalex	Italtrans Racing Team	18	0	0	0	0	56*	15th*
Total				**38**	**0**	**0**	**0**	**0**	**83**	

==== By class ====
Class	Seasons	1st GP	1st pod	1st win	Race	Win	Podiums	Pole	FLap	Pts	WChmp
Moto2	2025–present	2025 Thailand			38	0	0	0	0	83	0
Total	2025–present				**38**	**0**	**0**	**0**	**0**	**83**	**0**

==== Races by year ====
(key) (Races in bold indicate pole position, races in italics indicate fastest lap)

Year	Class	Bike	1	2	3	4	5	6	7	8	9	10	11	12	13	14	15	16	17	18	19	20	21	22	Pos	Pts
2025	Moto2	Kalex	THA; 14	ARG; Ret	AME; 16	QAT; 17	SPA; 13	FRA; 18	GBR	ARA; 19	ITA; 22	NED; Ret	GER; 18	CZE; 14	AUT; 18	HUN; 7	CAT; 17	RSM; Ret	JPN; 16	INA; 10	AUS; 11	MAL; 18	POR; 18	VAL; DNS	21st	27
2026	Moto2	Kalex	THA; DNS	BRA; 12	USA; 12	SPA; Ret	FRA; 18	CAT; 21	ITA; 12	HUN; 16	CZE; 21	NED; 7	GER; 11	GBR; 18	ARA; 10	RSM; 11	AUT; Ret	JPN; 11	INA; 16	AUS; C	MAL; 6	QAT; 12	POR	VAL	15th*	56*

* Season still in progress.
