= Speed Up =

Motorcycle frame manufacturer and racing team from Italy

Speed Up Srl
- Type: Private company
- Industry: Mechanical engineering, Motorcycles
- Founded: 2010
- Founder: Luca Boscoscuro
- Headquarters: Lugo di Vicenza, Italy
- Products: Chassis, Frames
- Brands: Boscoscuro
- Website: www.teamspeedup.it/en/

Team Speed Up
- Base: Vicenza, Italy
- Principal: Luca Boscoscuro
- Rider(s): Moto2: 13. Celestino Vietti; 32. Luca Lunetta
- Motorcycle: Boscoscuro B-26
- Tyres: Pirelli
- Constructors' Championships: Moto2 European Championship: 2020, 2021
- Riders' Championships: Moto2 European Championship: 2020: Yari Montella; 2021: Fermín Aldeguer

Speed Up is an Italian motorcycle racing team and constructor founded in 2010 and based in Vicenza, Italy. In 2012, the company started building its own branded chassis under the Speed Up Factory name. Beginning with the 2021 season, the company re-branded their factory-entered machines under the name Boscoscuro to better differentiate between their own racing team and chassis kits supplied to other teams.

== History ==
The team was founded in 2010 by the former Grand Prix motorcyclist Luca Boscoscuro and entered the newly formed Moto2 class of the world championship. In the team's first year they achieved three wins with their S10 motorcycle, based on a FTR Moto M210 frame, ridden by Andrea Iannone and Gábor Talmácsi. In 2011 the Speed Up team elected to enter an FTR M211 chassis ridden by Pol Espargaró and Valentin Debise.

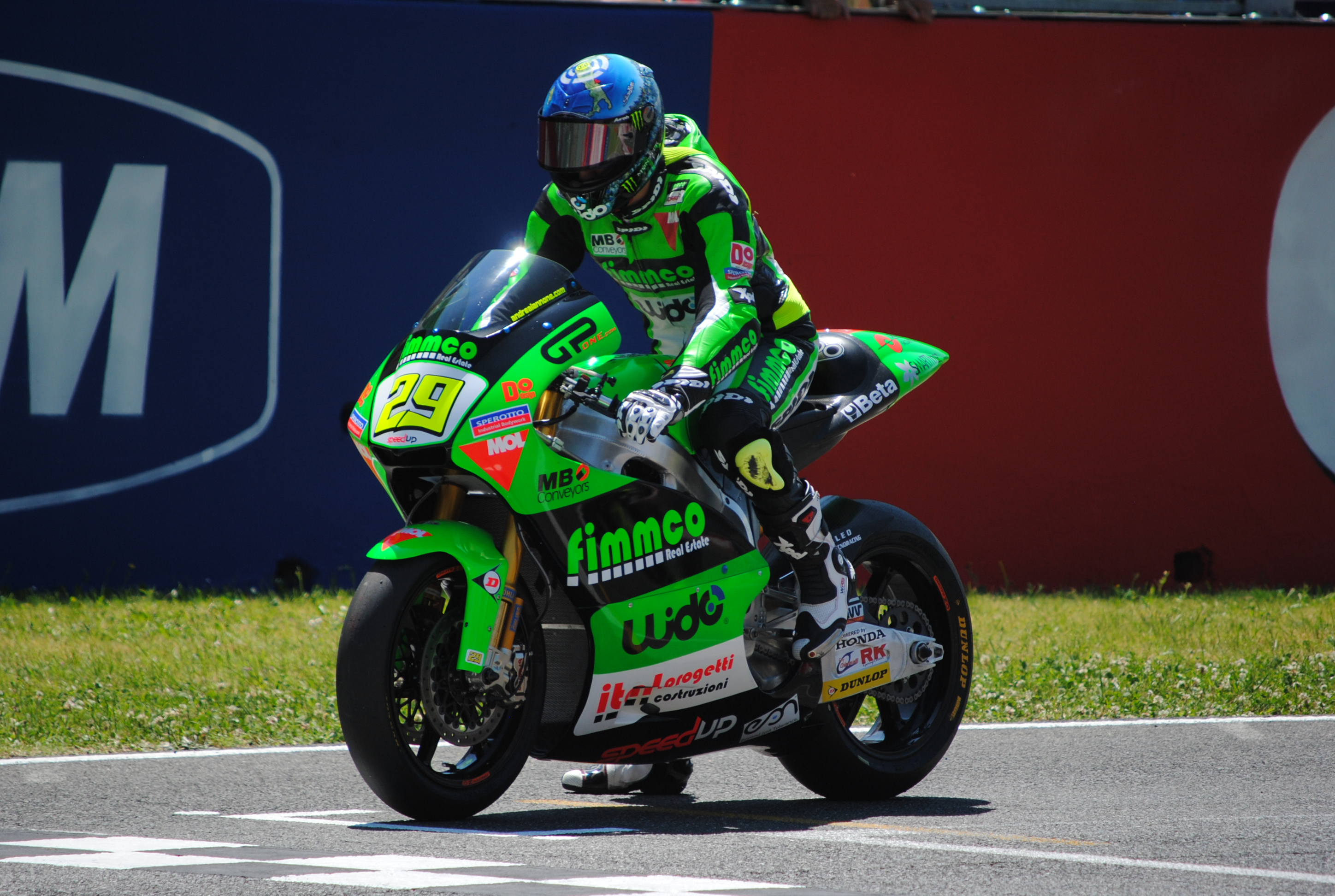
Andrea Iannone on a Speed Up S10 motorcycle

In 2012 Speed Up started building its own chassis named the S12. Boscoscuro entered into partnership with Andrea Iannone's Speed Master team supplying him with the new frames and fielding a bike for Mike Di Meglio; the best results were achieved by Iannone thanks to two victories. During the season, the QMMF Racing Team switched from Moriwaki to Speed Up frames.

In 2013, saw the debut of the SF13 chassis, fielded by three teams – Forward Racing, AGR and QMMF Racing Team, no factory team raced this year, achieving only a podium with Simone Corsi as a best result.

In 2014, Speed Up debuted the new SF14 frame, entering its own team with Sam Lowes and again supplying the QMMF Racing Team, who won the Dutch TT with Anthony West.

In 2015, followed a similar pattern with Sam Lowes and Anthony West remaining with their respective teams; West being joined in the QMMF team by Julián Simón. Lowes finished the season as the only non-Kalex rider in the top 14 of the final championship standings, in fourth place in the year-end table, having won at the Circuit of the Americas.

Simone Corsi at the 2016 German Grand Prix

The 2016 season saw Speed Up's own team line up with a new rider in Simone Corsi, with Lowes having left to join Gresini Racing in 2016 with a following MotoGP contract for 2017. The QMMF team raced with West and Simón.

In 2021, with a view to differentiating the racing team from the chassis production, the motorcycle prototype frames produced were renamed under the brand Boscoscuro.

== Results ==
Year	Class	Team name	Motorcycle	No.	Riders	Races	Wins	Podiums	Poles	F. laps	Points	Pos.
2010	Moto2	Fimmco Speed Up	Speed Up S10	2	(Hungary) Gábor Talmácsi	17	0	1	1	0	109	6th
2010	Moto2	Fimmco Speed Up	Speed Up S10	29	(Italy) Andrea Iannone	17	3	8	5	6	199	3rd
2011	Moto2	Speed Master	Suter MMXI	29	(Italy) Andrea Iannone	17	3	6	0	7	177	3rd
2011	Moto2	HP Tuenti Speed Up; Speed Up	FTR Moto M211	44	(Spain) Pol Espargaró	17	0	2	0	1	7	13th
2011	Moto2	HP Tuenti Speed Up; Speed Up	FTR Moto M211	53	(France) Valentin Debise	17	0	0	0	0	0	NC
2012	Moto2	Speed Master; S/Master Speed Up	Speed Up S12	29	(Italy) Andrea Iannone	17	2	5	0	0	194	3rd
2012	Moto2	Speed Master; S/Master Speed Up	Speed Up S12	63	(France) Mike Di Meglio	7 (16) (Note: Non-bracketed number refers to the number accumulated with team, with number in brackets referring to the total accumulated for the season.)	0	0	0	0	10 (17)	22nd
2012	Moto2	Speed Master; S/Master Speed Up	Speed Up S12	22	(Italy) Alessandro Andreozzi	10 (11)	0	0	0	0	0	34th
2014	Moto2	Speed Up	Speed Up SF14	22	(United Kingdom) Sam Lowes	18	0	0	0	0	69	13th
2015	Moto2	Speed Up Racing	Speed Up SF15	22	(United Kingdom) Sam Lowes	18	1	5	3	1	186	4th
2016	Moto2	Speed Up Racing	Speed Up SF16	24	(Italy) Simone Corsi	18	0	2	0	0	103	10th
2017	Moto2	Speed Up Racing	Speed Up SF7	24	(Italy) Simone Corsi	18	0	0	0	0	117	9th
2017	Moto2	Speed Up Racing	Speed Up SF7	47	(Italy) Axel Bassani	4	0	0	0	0	0	43rd
2017	Moto2	Speed Up Racing	Speed Up SF7	88	(Spain) Ricard Cardús	1 (5)	0	0	0	0	0 (7)	29th
2017	Moto2	Speed Up Racing	Speed Up SF7	37	(Spain) Augusto Fernández	13	0	0	0	0	6	31st
2018	Moto2	Beta Tools - Speed Up; MB Conveyors - Speed Up; HDR Heidrun - Speed Up; Lightech - Speed Up; Boost - Speed Up (+)Ego - Speed Up	Speed Up SF8	20	(France) Fabio Quartararo	18	1	2	1	1	138	10th
2018	Moto2	Beta Tools - Speed Up; MB Conveyors - Speed Up; HDR Heidrun - Speed Up; Lightech - Speed Up; Boost - Speed Up (+)Ego - Speed Up	Speed Up SF8	52	(United Kingdom) Danny Kent	13	0	0	0	0	8	25th
2018	Moto2	Beta Tools - Speed Up; MB Conveyors - Speed Up; HDR Heidrun - Speed Up; Lightech - Speed Up; Boost - Speed Up (+)Ego - Speed Up	Speed Up SF8	57	(Spain) Edgar Pons	4 (6)	0	0	0	0	1	31st
2018	Moto2	Beta Tools - Speed Up; MB Conveyors - Speed Up; HDR Heidrun - Speed Up; Lightech - Speed Up; Boost - Speed Up (+)Ego - Speed Up	Speed Up SF8	70	(Italy) Tommaso Marcon	1	0	0	0	0	0	42nd
2019	Moto2	+Ego Speed Up; Beta Tools Speed Up; HDR Heidrun Speed Up; Lightech Speed Up; MB Conveyors Speed Up; Campetella Speed Up	Speed Up SF19T	9	(Spain) Jorge Navarro	19	0	8	4	2	226	4th
2019	Moto2	+Ego Speed Up; Beta Tools Speed Up; HDR Heidrun Speed Up; Lightech Speed Up; MB Conveyors Speed Up; Campetella Speed Up	Speed Up SF19T	21	(Italy) Fabio Di Giannantonio	19	0	2	1	0	108	9th
2020	Moto2	Beta Tools Speed Up; HDR Heidrun Speed Up; MB Conveyors Speed Up +Ego Speed Up; Termozeta Speed Up	Speed Up SF20T	9	(Spain) Jorge Navarro	15	0	0	0	0	58	17th
2020	Moto2	Beta Tools Speed Up; HDR Heidrun Speed Up; MB Conveyors Speed Up +Ego Speed Up; Termozeta Speed Up	Speed Up SF20T	21	(Italy) Fabio Di Giannantonio	15	0	2	0	0	65	15th
2021	Moto2	MB Conveyors Speed Up; Lightech Speed Up +Ego Speed Up; Termozeta Speed Up	Boscoscuro B-21	5	(Italy) Yari Montella	7	0	0	0	0	0	34th
2021	Moto2	MB Conveyors Speed Up; Lightech Speed Up +Ego Speed Up; Termozeta Speed Up	Boscoscuro B-21	9	(Spain) Jorge Navarro	18	0	1	0	1	106	9th
2021	Moto2	MB Conveyors Speed Up; Lightech Speed Up +Ego Speed Up; Termozeta Speed Up	Boscoscuro B-21	2	(Spain) Alonso López	3 (4)	0	0	0	0	0 (4)	30th
2021	Moto2	MB Conveyors Speed Up; Lightech Speed Up +Ego Speed Up; Termozeta Speed Up	Boscoscuro B-21	54	(Spain) Fermín Aldeguer	4 (8)	0	0	0	0	13	25th
2021	Moto2	MB Conveyors Speed Up; Lightech Speed Up +Ego Speed Up; Termozeta Speed Up	Boscoscuro B-21	54	(Spain) Fermín Aldeguer	4 (8)	0	0	0	0	0	25th
2022	Moto2	Speed Up Racing	Boscoscuro B-22	5	(Italy) Romano Fenati	6	0	0	0	0	7	27th
2022	Moto2	Speed Up Racing	Boscoscuro B-22	54	(Spain) Fermín Aldeguer	20	0	0	2	0	80	15th
2022	Moto2	Speed Up Racing	Boscoscuro B-22	21	(Spain) Alonso López	14	2	5	1	1	155.5	8th
2023	Moto2	Speed Up Racing	Boscoscuro B-23	21	(Spain) Alonso López	20	0	5	2	1	150	7th
2023	Moto2	Speed Up Racing	Boscoscuro B-23	54	(Spain) Fermín Aldeguer	20	5	7	3	4	212	3rd
2024	Moto2	Speed Up Racing	Boscoscuro B-24	21	(Spain) Alonso López	20	1	5	0	2	178	6th
2024	Moto2	Speed Up Racing	Boscoscuro B-24	54	(Spain) Fermín Aldeguer	19	3	5	3	2	182	5th
2024	Moto2	Speed Up Racing	Boscoscuro B-24	19	(Italy) Mattia Pasini	4	0	0	0	0	0	34th
2024	Moto2	Speed Up Racing	Boscoscuro B-24	67	(Italy) Alberto Surra	1	0	0	0	0	0	NC
2025	Moto2	SpeedRS Team; Team HDR Heidrun; Beta Tools SpeedRS Team; Folladore SpeedRS Team; Sync SpeedRS Team	Boscoscuro B-25	13	(Italy) Celestino Vietti	22	1	3	0	0	157	7th
2025	Moto2	SpeedRS Team; Team HDR Heidrun; Beta Tools SpeedRS Team; Folladore SpeedRS Team; Sync SpeedRS Team	Boscoscuro B-25	21	(Spain) Alonso López	21	0	1	0	0	83	18th
2025	Moto2	Beta Tools – Boscoscuro	Boscoscuro B-25	93	(Spain) Alberto Ferrández	1	0	0	0	0	0	36th
2026	Moto2	Speed Up Racing	Boscoscuro B-24	8	(Italy) Dennis Foggia	2	0	0	0	0	0*	32nd*
2026	Moto2	Speed Up Racing	Boscoscuro B-24	13	(Italy) Celestino Vietti	19	0	3	1	2	146	8th*
2026	Moto2	Speed Up Racing	Boscoscuro B-24	32	(Italy) Luca Lunetta	17	0	0	0	0	27*	19th*

Key
Regular rider
Replacement rider
Wildcard rider
Replacement/wildcard rider

Notes

* Season still in progress.
