= Jorge Navarro =

Spanish motorcycle racer (born 1996)

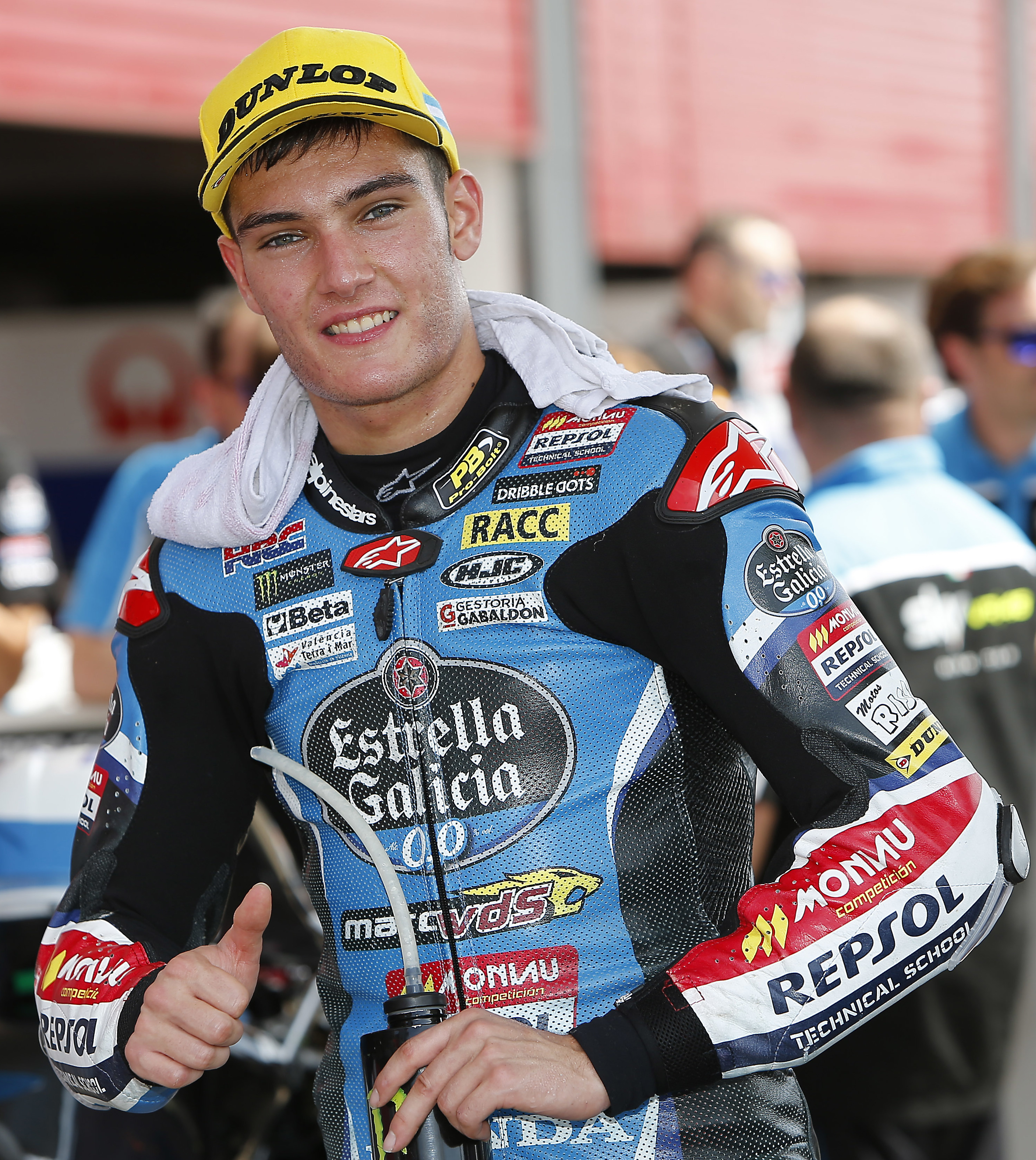
- Navarro at the 2016 Argentine Grand Prix
- Nationality: Spanish
- Born: 3 February 1996 (age 30); La Pobla de Vallbona, Spain
- Current team: Reds Fantic Racing
- Bike number: 9
- Website: navarrojorge.com
Motorcycle racing career statistics
Moto2 World Championship
| Active years | 2017–2022, 2024– |
| Manufacturers | Kalex, Boscoscuro, Forward |
| 2025 championship position | 29th (3 pts) |
Starts / Wins / Podiums / Poles / F. laps / Points; 142 / 0 / 11 / 5 / 3 / 621
Moto3 World Championship
| Active years | 2012–2016 |
| Manufacturers | Honda, MIR Racing, MIR Honda, Kalex KTM |
| 2016 championship position | 3rd (150 pts) |
Starts / Wins / Podiums / Poles / F. laps / Points; 46 / 2 / 9 / 1 / 1 / 318
Supersport World Championship
| Active years | 2023–2024 |
| Manufacturers | Yamaha, Triumph, Ducati |
| Championships | 0 |
| 2024 championship position | 6th (192 pts) |
Starts / Wins / Podiums / Poles / F. laps / Points; 48 / 0 / 3 / 0 / 1 / 356

Jorge Navarro Sánchez (born 3 February 1996) is a Spanish motorcycle racer, who most recently competed in the 2026 Moto2 World Championship for Reds Fantic Racing. He has previously raced in the Supersport World Championship, for Ducati's Orelac Racing Verdnatura team. In his Grand Prix motorcycle racing career, he has scored two wins and 20 podiums, along with six pole positions total in Moto2 and Moto3. In his early career, he also competed in the FIM CEV Moto3 series, finishing as runner-up to Fabio Quartararo in the 2014 championship, and fifth in 2013.

== Career ==
=== Supersport World Championship ===
For 2023, Navarro joined Ten Kate Racing Yamaha for the Supersport World Championship. He finished the season seventh in the standings, scoring his first podium of the category in Portimao.

Originally signed to Triumph's WRP-RT Motorsport by SKM team for the 2024 Supersport World Championship, following three successful weekends, Navarro was signed by Ducati's Orelac Racing Verdnatura team, to replace Lorenzo Baldassarri.

== Career statistics ==
=== CEV Buckler Moto3 Championship ===
==== Races by year ====
(key) (Races in bold indicate pole position, races in italics indicate fastest lap)

| Year | Bike | 1 | 2 | 3 | 4 | 5 | 6 | 7 | 8 | 9 | 10 | 11 | Pos | Pts |
|---|---|---|---|---|---|---|---|---|---|---|---|---|---|---|
| 2012 | Honda | JER; 11 | NAV; Ret | ARA; 8 | CAT; 10 | ALB1; Ret | ALB2; 7 | VAL; 8 | | | | | 12th | 36 |
| 2013 | MIR Racing | CAT1; Ret | CAT2; Ret | ARA; 2 | ALB1; 4 | ALB2; 2 | NAV; 4 | VAL1; 7 | VAL1; 5 | JER; 5 | | | 6th | 97 |
| 2014 | Ioda | JER1; 4 | JER2; 5 | LMS; 4 | ARA; 2 | CAT1; 2 | CAT2; 3 | ALB; 1 | | | | | 2nd | 138 |
| 2014 | Kalex KTM | | | | | | | | NAV; 2 | | | | 2nd | 138 |
| 2014 | Honda | | | | | | | | | ALG | VAL1; 32 | VAL1; Ret | 2nd | 138 |

=== FIM Moto2 European Championship ===
==== Races by year ====
(key) (Races in bold indicate pole position, races in italics indicate fastest lap)

| Year | Bike | 1 | 2 | 3 | 4 | 5 | 6 | 7 | 8 | 9 | 10 | 11 | Pos | Pts |
|---|---|---|---|---|---|---|---|---|---|---|---|---|---|---|
| 2024 | Forward | MIS | EST1; 2 | EST2; 8 | **CAT1**; 2 | **CAT2**; 2 | POR1; 9 | POR2; 7 | JER | ARA1 | ARA2 | EST | 7th | 84 |

=== Grand Prix motorcycle racing ===
==== By season ====
| Season | Class | Motorcycle | Team | Race | Win | Podium | Pole | FLap | Pts | Plcd |
|---|---|---|---|---|---|---|---|---|---|---|
| 2012 | Moto3 | Honda | Bradol Larresport | 1 | 0 | 0 | 0 | 0 | 0 | NC |
| 2013 | Moto3 | MIR Racing | Cuna de Campeones | 2 | 0 | 0 | 0 | 0 | 0 | NC |
| 2013 | Moto3 | MIR Honda | Cuna de Campeones | 2 | 0 | 0 | 0 | 0 | 0 | NC |
| 2014 | Moto3 | Kalex KTM | Marc VDS Racing Team | 9 | 0 | 0 | 0 | 0 | 11 | 23rd |
| 2015 | Moto3 | Honda | Estrella Galicia 0,0 | 17 | 0 | 4 | 1 | 1 | 157 | 7th |
| 2016 | Moto3 | Honda | Estrella Galicia 0,0 | 17 | 2 | 5 | 0 | 0 | 150 | **3rd** |
| 2017 | Moto2 | Kalex | Federal Oil Gresini Moto2 | 17 | 0 | 0 | 0 | 0 | 60 | 14th |
| 2018 | Moto2 | Kalex | Federal Oil Gresini Moto2 | 18 | 0 | 0 | 0 | 0 | 58 | 13th |
| 2019 | Moto2 | Speed Up | Speed Up Racing | 19 | 0 | 8 | 4 | 2 | 226 | 4th |
| 2020 | Moto2 | Speed Up | Speed Up Racing | 15 | 0 | 0 | 0 | 0 | 58 | 17th |
| 2021 | Moto2 | Boscoscuro | Speed Up Racing | 18 | 0 | 1 | 0 | 1 | 106 | 9th |
| 2022 | Moto2 | Kalex | Flexbox HP40 | 18 | 0 | 1 | 0 | 0 | 83 | 14th |
| 2024 | Moto2 | Forward | Klint Forward Factory Team | 6 | 0 | 0 | 0 | 0 | 27 | 23rd |
| 2024 | Moto2 | Kalex | OnlyFans American Racing Team | 3 | 0 | 1 | 1 | 0 | 27 | 23rd |
| 2025 | Moto2 | Forward | Klint Forward Factory Racing | 22 | 0 | 0 | 0 | 0 | 3 | 29th |
| 2026 | Moto2 | Forward | Klint Racing Team | 4 | 0 | 0 | 0 | 0 | 0* | 31st* |
| 2026 | Moto2 | Kalex | Reds Fantic Racing | 2 | 0 | 0 | 0 | 0 | 0* | 31st* |
| Total | | | | **188** | **2** | **20** | **6** | **4** | **939** | |

==== By class ====
| Class | Seasons | 1st GP | 1st pod | 1st win | Race | Win | Podiums | Pole | FLap | Pts |
|---|---|---|---|---|---|---|---|---|---|---|
| Moto3 | 2012–2016 | 2012 Aragón | 2015 Aragón | 2016 Catalunya | 46 | 2 | 9 | 1 | 1 | 318 |
| Moto2 | 2017–2022, 2024–present | 2017 Qatar | 2019 Americas | | 142 | 0 | 11 | 5 | 3 | 621 |
| Total | 2012–2022, 2024–present | | | | **188** | **2** | **20** | **6** | **4** | **939** |

==== Races by year ====
(key) (Races in bold indicate pole position; races in italics indicate fastest lap)

| Year | Class | Bike | 1 | 2 | 3 | 4 | 5 | 6 | 7 | 8 | 9 | 10 | 11 | 12 | 13 | 14 | 15 | 16 | 17 | 18 | 19 | 20 | 21 | 22 | Pos | Pts |
|---|---|---|---|---|---|---|---|---|---|---|---|---|---|---|---|---|---|---|---|---|---|---|---|---|---|---|
| 2012 | Moto3 | Honda | QAT | SPA | POR | FRA | CAT | GBR | NED | GER | ITA | INP | CZE | RSM | ARA; Ret | JPN | MAL | AUS | VAL | | | | | | NC | 0 |
| 2013 | Moto3 | MIR Racing | QAT | AME | SPA; Ret | FRA | ITA | CAT | NED | GER | INP | CZE | GBR | RSM | ARA | MAL | AUS | JPN | | | | | | | NC | 0 |
| 2013 | Moto3 | MIR Honda | | | | | | | | | | | | | | | | | VAL; 22 | | | | | | NC | 0 |
| 2014 | Moto3 | Kalex KTM | QAT | AME | ARG | SPA | FRA | ITA | CAT | NED | GER | INP; 14 | CZE; Ret | GBR; 27 | RSM; 15 | ARA; Ret | JPN; Ret | AUS; 12 | MAL; 12 | VAL; Ret | | | | | 23rd | 11 |
| 2015 | Moto3 | Honda | QAT; 12 | AME; Ret | ARG; Ret | SPA; 8 | FRA; Ret | ITA; 7 | CAT; 6 | NED; 4 | GER; 6 | INP; 9 | CZE; 5 | **GBR**; Ret | RSM; DNS | ARA; 2 | JPN; 3 | AUS; 4 | MAL; 3 | VAL; 2 | | | | | 7th | 157 |
| 2016 | Moto3 | Honda | QAT; 7 | ARG; 2 | AME; 2 | SPA; 4 | FRA; 3 | ITA; Ret | CAT; 1 | NED | GER; 7 | AUT; Ret | CZE; 10 | GBR; Ret | RSM; Ret | ARA; 1 | JPN; Ret | AUS; Ret | MAL; Ret | VAL; 9 | | | | | 3rd | 150 |
| 2017 | Moto2 | Kalex | QAT; Ret | ARG; 15 | AME; 15 | SPA; 12 | FRA; Ret | ITA; 9 | CAT; 6 | NED; 15 | GER; 6 | CZE; 11 | AUT; 8 | GBR; 13 | RSM; Ret | ARA; 6 | JPN; 28 | AUS; Ret | MAL | VAL; Ret | | | | | 14th | 60 |
| 2018 | Moto2 | Kalex | QAT; 10 | ARG; Ret | AME; 8 | SPA; 17 | FRA; Ret | ITA; Ret | CAT; Ret | NED; 13 | GER; 10 | CZE; 8 | AUT; 5 | GBR; C | RSM; 9 | ARA; 10 | THA; 17 | JPN; Ret | AUS; Ret | MAL; 13 | VAL; Ret | | | | 13th | 58 |
| 2019 | Moto2 | Speed Up | QAT; Ret | ARG; 8 | AME; 3 | **SPA**; 2 | **FRA**; 2 | ITA; 7 | CAT; 3 | NED; Ret | GER; 8 | CZE; 4 | AUT; 3 | GBR; 2 | RSM; 7 | ARA; 2 | THA; 17 | JPN; 5 | **AUS**; 4 | MAL; 5 | **VAL**; 3 | | | | 4th | 226 |
| 2020 | Moto2 | Speed Up | QAT; 6 | SPA; Ret | ANC; Ret | CZE; 7 | AUT; Ret | STY; Ret | RSM; Ret | EMI; 7 | CAT; 4 | FRA; Ret | ARA; 27 | TER; 5 | EUR; 10 | VAL; Ret | POR; Ret | | | | | | | | 17th | 58 |
| 2021 | Moto2 | Boscoscuro | QAT; 10 | DOH; 13 | POR; 22 | SPA; 12 | FRA; 10 | ITA; Ret | CAT; 11 | GER; 7 | NED; 7 | STY; 20 | AUT; Ret | GBR; 3 | ARA; 4 | RSM; 13 | AME; 12 | EMI; 5 | ALR; 7 | VAL; 8 | | | | | 9th | 106 |
| 2022 | Moto2 | Kalex | QAT; 7 | INA; 13 | ARG; Ret | AME; 5 | POR; 3 | SPA; 10 | FRA; 9 | ITA; 12 | CAT; 14 | GER; Ret | NED; 12 | GBR; 8 | AUT; 11 | RSM; Ret | ARA; 8 | JPN; Ret | THA; 20 | AUS; Ret | MAL | VAL | | | 14th | 83 |
| 2024 | Moto2 | Forward | QAT | POR | AME | SPA; 18 | FRA; 20 | CAT; 10 | ITA | NED | GER | GBR; 18 | AUT; Ret | ARA; 23 | RSM | EMI | INA | JPN | AUS | | | | | | 23rd | 27 |
| 2024 | Moto2 | Kalex | | | | | | | | | | | | | | | | | | THA; 15 | **MAL**; 2 | SLD; Ret | | | 23rd | 27 |
| 2025 | Moto2 | Forward | THA; Ret | ARG; 21 | AME; 18 | QAT; 25 | SPA; 21 | FRA; Ret | GBR; 15 | ARA; 23 | ITA; Ret | NED; Ret | GER; 14 | CZE; 22 | AUT; 17 | HUN; 18 | CAT; Ret | RSM; Ret | JPN; 18 | INA; 20 | AUS; 24 | MAL; 19 | POR; 22 | VAL; 19 | 29th | 3 |
| 2026 | Moto2 | Forward | THA; 17 | BRA; Ret | USA; Ret | SPA; Ret | FRA; DNS | CAT | ITA | HUN | CZE | | | | | | | | | | | | | | 31st* | 0* |
| 2026 | Moto2 | Kalex | | | | | | | | | | NED; 25 | GER; 18 | GBR | ARA | RSM | AUT | JPN | INA | AUS | MAL | QAT | POR | VAL | 31st* | 0* |

* Season still in progress.

=== Supersport World Championship ===
==== Races by year ====
(key) (Races in bold indicate pole position, races in italics indicate fastest lap)

| Year | Bike | 1 | | 2 | | 3 | | 4 | | 5 | | 6 | | 7 | | 8 | | 9 | | 10 | | 11 | | 12 | | Pos | Pts |
| Year | Bike | R1 | R2 | R1 | R2 | R1 | R2 | R1 | R2 | R1 | R2 | R1 | R2 | R1 | R2 | R1 | R2 | R1 | R2 | R1 | R2 | R1 | R2 | R1 | R2 | Pos | Pts |
|---|---|---|---|---|---|---|---|---|---|---|---|---|---|---|---|---|---|---|---|---|---|---|---|---|---|---|---|
| 2023 | Yamaha | AUS; 9 | AUS; 6 | INA; 12 | INA; 8 | NED; 10 | NED; 7 | SPA; 7 | SPA; 9 | EMI; 8 | EMI; 18 | GBR; 12 | GBR; 11 | ITA; Ret | ITA; 6 | CZE; 9 | CZE; Ret | FRA; Ret | FRA; 9 | SPA; 7 | SPA; 6 | POR; 3 | POR; 7 | JER; 4 | JER; 11 | 7th | 163 |
| 2024 | Triumph | AUS; 7 | AUS; 12 | SPA; 7 | SPA; 7 | NED; 7 | NED; 11 | | | | | | | | | | | | | | | | | | | 6th | 192 |
| 2024 | Ducati | | | | | | | ITA; 5 | ITA; 5 | GBR; 4 | GBR; 3 | CZE; 18 | CZE; 5 | POR; 4 | POR; 25 | FRA; 8 | FRA; 5 | ITA; Ret | ITA; 7 | SPA; 5 | SPA; 3 | POR; 22 | POR; 9 | SPA; Ret | SPA; 6 | 6th | 192 |
