= 2022 Moto2 World Championship =

13th running of the Moto2 World Championship

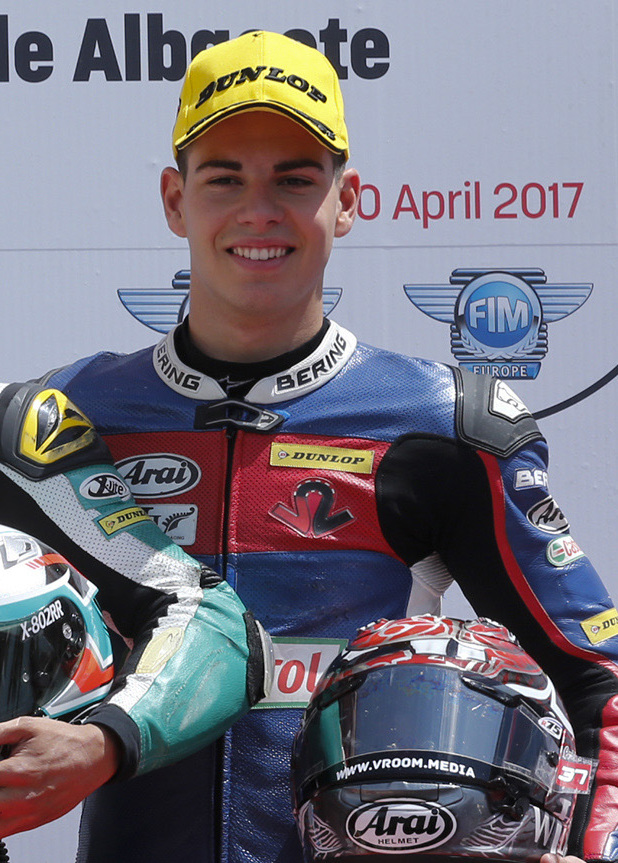
Augusto Fernández (pictured in 2017) was the 2022 Moto2 World Riders' Champion.

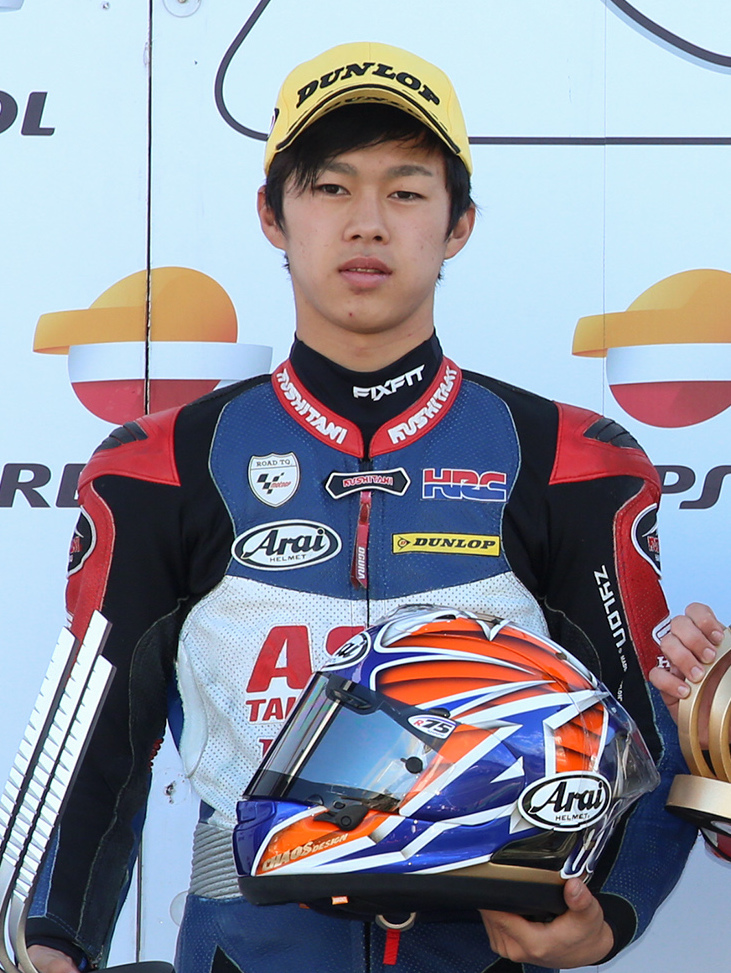
Ai Ogura (pictured in 2018) finished runner-up.

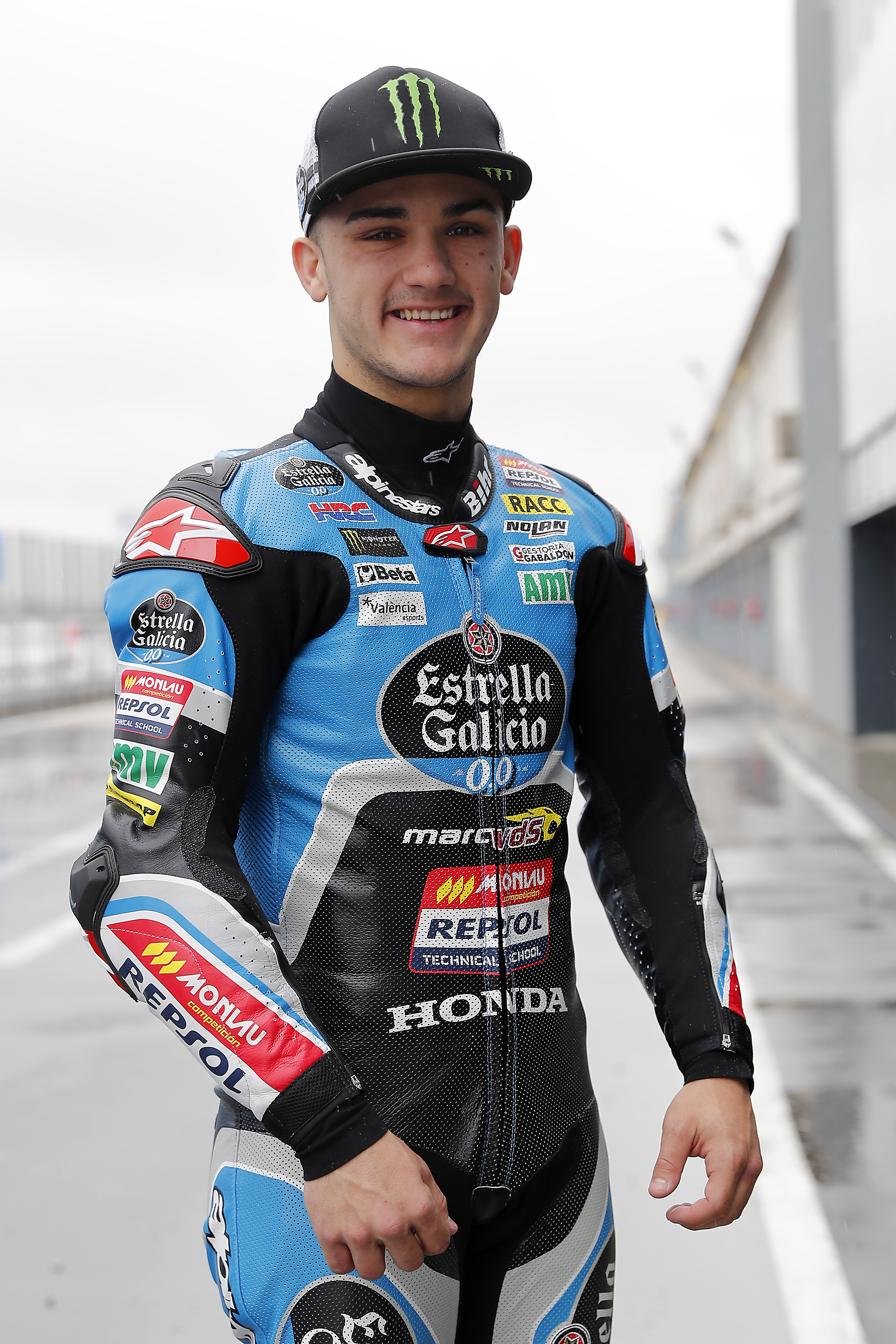
Arón Canet (pictured in 2018) finished third.

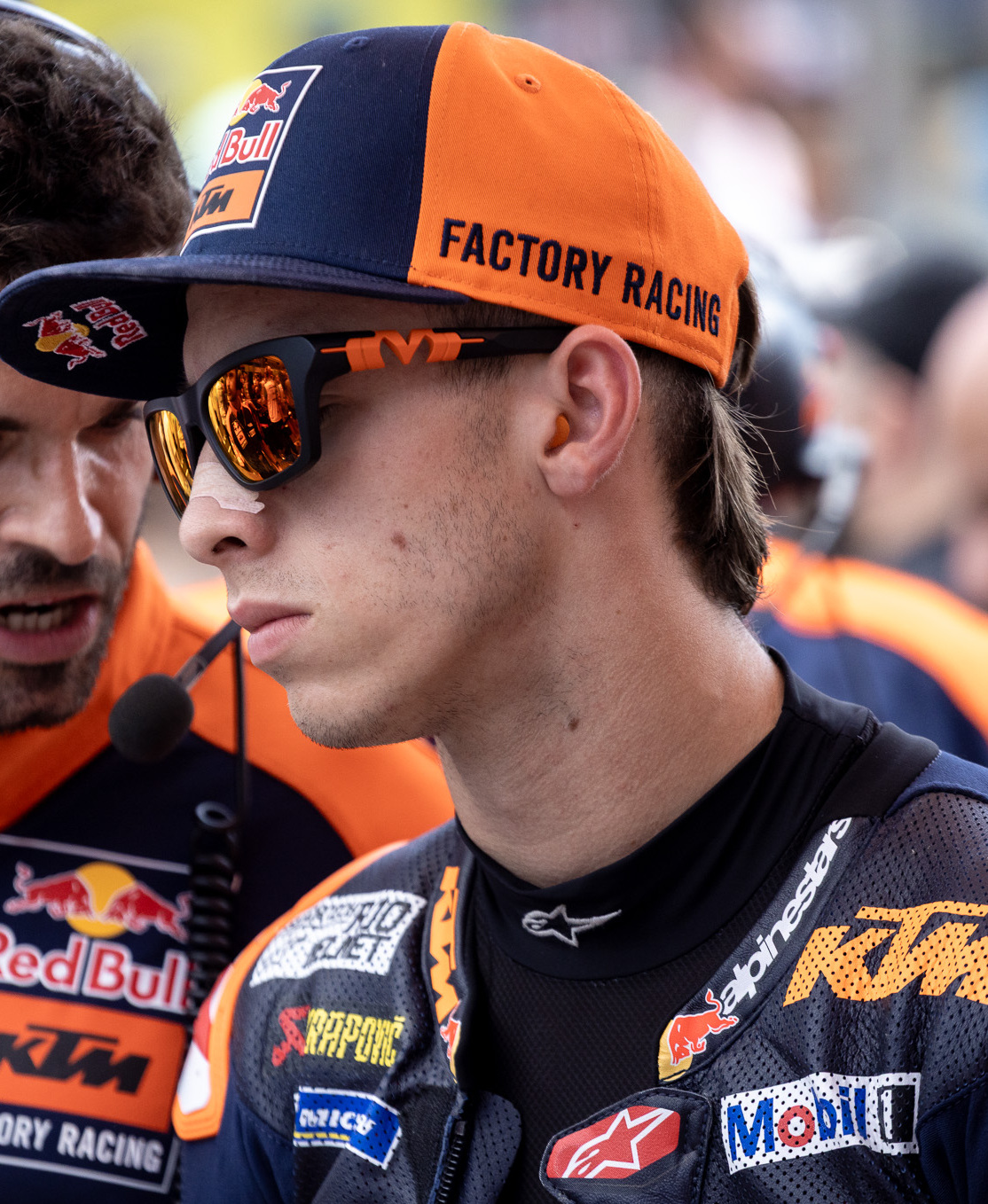
Pedro Acosta (pictured in 2025), the 2022 Moto2 Rookie of the Year.

The 2022 FIM Moto2 World Championship was the intermediate class of the 74th Fédération Internationale de Motocyclisme (FIM) Road Racing World Championship season. Augusto Fernández won the championship for Red Bull KTM Ajo after the Valencian Grand Prix.

== Teams and riders ==
Team	Constructor	Motorcycle	No.	Rider	Rounds
(Italy) Speed Up Racing (Note: This is the team name entered in the championship. Other team names used during the season are MB Conveyors Speed Up (rounds 1–4, 7–9, 11), Lightech Speed Up (rounds 5–6, 10), CAG Speed Up (rounds 12–13, 15–16), +Ego Speed Up (round 14), and Beta Tools Speed Up (rounds 17–20).)	Boscoscuro	B-22	5	(Italy) Romano Fenati	1–6
(Italy) Speed Up Racing	Boscoscuro	B-22	21	(Spain) Alonso López	7–20
(Italy) Speed Up Racing	Boscoscuro	B-22	54	(Spain) Fermín Aldeguer	All
(United States) American Racing	Kalex	Moto2	4	(United States) Sean Dylan Kelly	All
(United States) American Racing	Kalex	Moto2	6	(United States) Cameron Beaubier	All
(United States) American Racing	Kalex	Moto2	33	(United Kingdom) Rory Skinner	12–13
(Belgium) Elf Marc VDS Racing Team	Kalex	Moto2	14	(Italy) Tony Arbolino	All
(Belgium) Elf Marc VDS Racing Team	Kalex	Moto2	22	(United Kingdom) Sam Lowes	1–12, 16–19
(Belgium) Elf Marc VDS Racing Team	Kalex	Moto2	8	(Australia) Senna Agius	13–15, 20
(Spain) Flexbox HP40	Kalex	Moto2	9	(Spain) Jorge Navarro	1–18
(Spain) Flexbox HP40	Kalex	Moto2	72	(Spain) Borja Gómez	19–20
(Spain) Flexbox HP40	Kalex	Moto2	40	(Spain) Arón Canet	All
(Spain) GasGas Aspar Team (Note: This is the team name entered in the championship. Other team names used during the season are Inde GasGas Aspar Team (rounds 1–2, 7–11, 14, 17–20), Autosolar GasGas Aspar Team (rounds 3, 5–6), Shimoko GasGas Aspar Team (rounds 4, 15–16), and Zinia GasGas Aspar Team (round 13).)	Kalex	Moto2	75	(Spain) Albert Arenas	All
(Spain) GasGas Aspar Team	Kalex	Moto2	96	(United Kingdom) Jake Dixon	All
(Spain) GasGas Aspar Team	Kalex	Moto2	11	(Italy) Mattia Pasini	8, 14
(Italy) Gresini Racing Moto2	Kalex	Moto2	12	(Czech Republic) Filip Salač	All
(Italy) Gresini Racing Moto2	Kalex	Moto2	61	(Italy) Alessandro Zaccone	All
(Japan) Idemitsu Honda Team Asia	Kalex	Moto2	35	(Thailand) Somkiat Chantra	All
(Japan) Idemitsu Honda Team Asia	Kalex	Moto2	79	(Japan) Ai Ogura	All
(Italy) Italtrans Racing Team	Kalex	Moto2	16	(United States) Joe Roberts	All
(Italy) Italtrans Racing Team	Kalex	Moto2	19	(Italy) Lorenzo Dalla Porta	All
(Germany) Liqui Moly Intact GP	Kalex	Moto2	23	(Germany) Marcel Schrötter	All
(Germany) Liqui Moly Intact GP	Kalex	Moto2	52	(Spain) Jeremy Alcoba	All
(Italy) Mooney VR46 Racing Team	Kalex	Moto2	13	(Italy) Celestino Vietti	All
(Italy) Mooney VR46 Racing Team	Kalex	Moto2	28	(Italy) Niccolò Antonelli	All
(Indonesia) Pertamina Mandalika SAG Team	Kalex	Moto2	2	(Argentina) Gabriel Rodrigo	1–8
(Indonesia) Pertamina Mandalika SAG Team	Kalex	Moto2	55	(Spain) Álex Toledo	9–11
(Indonesia) Pertamina Mandalika SAG Team	Kalex	Moto2	74	(Poland) Piotr Biesiekirski	12
(Indonesia) Pertamina Mandalika SAG Team	Kalex	Moto2	29	(Japan) Taiga Hada	13–20
(Indonesia) Pertamina Mandalika SAG Team	Kalex	Moto2	64	(Netherlands) Bo Bendsneyder	All
(Indonesia) Pertamina Mandalika SAG Team	Kalex	Moto2	74	(Poland) Piotr Biesiekirski	9
(Finland) Red Bull KTM Ajo	Kalex	Moto2	37	(Spain) Augusto Fernández	All
(Finland) Red Bull KTM Ajo	Kalex	Moto2	51	(Spain) Pedro Acosta	1–10, 12–20
(Netherlands) RW Racing GP (Note: Wildcard Azroy Anuar used the team name Petronas RW Racing during round 19.)	Kalex	Moto2	7	(Belgium) Barry Baltus	1–2, 4–19
(Netherlands) RW Racing GP	Kalex	Moto2	11	(Italy) Mattia Pasini	20
(Netherlands) RW Racing GP	Kalex	Moto2	84	(Netherlands) Zonta van den Goorbergh	1–18, 20
(Netherlands) RW Racing GP	Kalex	Moto2	20	(Malaysia) Azroy Anuar	19
(Malaysia) Petronas MIE Racing RW	Kalex	Moto2	27	(Malaysia) Kasma Daniel	19
(Italy) Yamaha VR46 Master Camp Team	Kalex	Moto2	18	(Spain) Manuel González	All
(Italy) Yamaha VR46 Master Camp Team	Kalex	Moto2	81	(Thailand) Keminth Kubo	1–3, 5–6, 8, 10−20 (Note: Keminth Kubo competed in the first Friday practice session during round 6, before being replaced by Stefano Manzi due to injury.)
(Italy) Yamaha VR46 Master Camp Team	Kalex	Moto2	62	(Italy) Stefano Manzi	6–7, 9
(Switzerland) MV Agusta Forward Racing	MV Agusta	F2	24	(Italy) Simone Corsi	1–18, 20
(Switzerland) MV Agusta Forward Racing	MV Agusta	F2	98	(Spain) David Sanchís	19
(Switzerland) MV Agusta Forward Racing	MV Agusta	F2	42	(Spain) Marcos Ramírez	All
(Switzerland) MV Agusta Forward Racing	MV Agusta	F2	17	(Spain) Álex Escrig	20

Key
Regular rider
Replacement rider
Wildcard rider

All teams used series-specified Dunlop tyres and Triumph 765cc 3-cylinder engines.

=== Team changes ===
- Petronas SRT withdrew from the category at the end of the 2021 season following the loss of their title sponsor. The team continued under the same management and different sponsor in the MotoGP class.
- RW Racing GP returned to the series-dominant Kalex chassis, after four seasons operating the factory programme for Japanese chassis builder NTS.

=== Rider changes ===
- Fabio Di Giannantonio moved up to MotoGP, as his second season in his contract clarified.
- Both Remy Gardner and Raul Fernandez moved up to MotoGP with Tech3.
- Thomas Lüthi retired at the end of the 2021 season.
- Tony Arbolino moved from Intact GP to Elf Marc VDS. Jeremy Alcoba joined the team moving up from Moto3, replacing Arbolino.
- Reigning Moto3 Riders' Champion Pedro Acosta moved up from Moto3 while remaining with Red Bull KTM Ajo. Augusto Fernández switched teams from Elf Marc VDS to join Acosta at Red Bull KTM Ajo.
- After two seasons, Arón Canet switched from Aspar Team to Pons Racing.
- Jorge Navarro moved from Speed Up to Pons Racing. Stefano Manzi and Hector Garzo left the team.
- Gabriel Rodrigo moved up to Moto2 riding with the Pertamina Mandalika SAG Team.
- Filip Salač and Alessandro Zaccone joined Gresini Racing. Nicolò Bulega, who raced for the team in 2021, moved to the Supersport World Championship.
- Sean Dylan Kelly moved from the MotoAmerica Supersport Championship to Moto2 with American Racing.
- Marcos Ramírez left American Racing to join MV Agusta Forward Racing, replacing Lorenzo Baldassarri, who moved to the Supersport World Championship.
- Romano Fenati was promoted for a second time to the Moto2 class with Speed Up Racing.
- Zonta van den Goorbergh made his debut with RW Racing GP. He previously raced in the CEV Moto3 Junior World Championship. He replaced Hafizh Syahrin, who subsequently moved to the Superbike World Championship.
- Xavi Vierge, who raced for the now defunct Petronas Sprinta Racing in 2021, moved to the Superbike World Championship.
- Niccolò Antonelli moved up to Moto2 with the VR46 Racing Team.
- Jake Dixon, who raced for the now defunct Petronas Sprinta Racing in 2021, returned to the Aspar Team, the team he raced with in the 2019 season.
- Keminth Kubo and Manuel González both made their full-time debuts with the newly-formed Yamaha VR46 Master Camp Team. Kubo appeared as a wildcard in the 2021 season and primarily raced at the CEV Moto2 European Championship, whilst González served as a replacement rider and primarily raced at the Supersport World Championship.

==== Mid-season changes ====
- Barry Baltus missed the Argentine round after sustaining a broken right wrist during qualifying of the previous Indonesian round. He was not replaced. Baltus also missed the Valencian round after suffering a left foot injury during the previous Malaysian round. He was replaced by Mattia Pasini.
- Keminth Kubo missed several races. He missed the Americas race after having issues with his visa. He was not replaced. He also competed during FP1 of the Spanish round, but withdrew following the diagnosis of costochondritis after FP1. He was replaced by Stefano Manzi for the race. Manzi also replaced Kubo for the succeeding French round. Kubo also missed the Catalan round to mourn the death of his father in his native Thailand. Manzi remained as his replacement for the race.
- Romano Fenati parted ways with Speed Up Racing after the Spanish round and was replaced by Alonso López starting with the succeeding French round.
- Gabriel Rodrigo missed the rest of the season starting from the Catalan round after undergoing surgery on his right shoulder. He was replaced by Álex Toledo for the Catalan, German, and Dutch rounds, by Piotr Biesiekirski for the British round, and by Taiga Hada for the rest of the season, starting from the Austrian round. Rodrigo eventually retired from motorcycle racing as a whole.
- Pedro Acosta missed the Dutch round after suffering a broken left femur in a training accident. He was not replaced.
- Sam Lowes missed the Austrian, San Marino, and Aragon rounds after suffering a dislocated shoulder during FP1 of the British round. He was replaced for all races by Senna Agius. He also missed the Valencian round due to shoulder injury. He was replaced again by Senna Agius.
- Zonta van den Goorbergh missed the Malaysian round after suffering a broken left wrist during FP1 of the Australian race. He was replaced by Azroy Anuar.
- Jorge Navarro missed the Malaysian and Valencian rounds after suffering a fractured femur during the Australian race. He was replaced for both races by Borja Gómez.
- Simone Corsi missed the Malaysian round after injuring his right little finger during the Australian race. He was replaced by David Sanchís.

== Calendar ==
The following Grands Prix took place in 2022:

Round	Date	Grand Prix	Circuit
1	6 March (Note: Night race)	Grand Prix of Qatar	Lusail International Circuit, Lusail
2	20 March	Pertamina Grand Prix of Indonesia	Mandalika International Street Circuit, Mandalika
3	3 April	Gran Premio Michelin de la República Argentina	Autódromo Termas de Río Hondo, Termas de Río Hondo
4	10 April	(United States) Red Bull Grand Prix of The Americas	Circuit of the Americas, Austin
5	24 April	Grande Prémio Tissot de Portugal	Algarve International Circuit, Portimão
6	1 May	(Spain) Gran Premio Red Bull de España	Circuito de Jerez, Jerez de la Frontera
7	15 May	Shark Grand Prix de France	Bugatti Circuit, Le Mans
8	29 May	(Italy) Gran Premio d'Italia Oakley	Mugello Circuit, Scarperia e San Piero
9	5 June	(Catalonia) Gran Premi Monster Energy de Catalunya	Circuit de Barcelona-Catalunya, Montmeló
10	19 June	(Germany) Liqui Moly Motorrad Grand Prix Deutschland	Sachsenring, Hohenstein-Ernstthal
11	26 June	(Netherlands) Motul TT Assen	TT Circuit Assen, Assen
12	7 August	(United Kingdom) Monster Energy British Grand Prix	Silverstone Circuit, Silverstone
13	21 August	(Austria) CryptoData Motorrad Grand Prix von Österreich	Red Bull Ring, Spielberg
14	4 September	Gran Premio Gryfyn di San Marino e della Riviera di Rimini	Misano World Circuit, Misano Adriatico
15	18 September	(Aragon) Gran Premio Animoca Brands de Aragón	MotorLand Aragón, Alcañiz
16	25 September	Motul Grand Prix of Japan	Motegi Circuit, Motegi
17	2 October	OR Thailand Grand Prix	Buriram International Circuit, Buriram
18	16 October	(Australia) Animoca Brands Australian Motorcycle Grand Prix	Phillip Island Grand Prix Circuit, Phillip Island
19	23 October	Petronas Grand Prix of Malaysia	Sepang International Circuit, Sepang
20	6 November	(Valencian Community) Gran Premio Motul de la Comunitat Valenciana	Circuit Ricardo Tormo, Valencia
Cancelled Grand Prix
–	~~10 July~~	(Finland) Finnish motorcycle Grand Prix	Kymi Ring, Iitti

=== Grand Prix locations ===
Location of non-European Grands Prix in 2022.
Location of European Grands Prix in 2022.
(scheduled Grand Prix: cancelled Grand Prix)

=== Calendar changes ===
Comparison between the configuration of the Red Bull Ring used from 2016 to 2021 (top), and the layout used starting 2022 (bottom).
- Cancelled Grands Prix in 2021 as a response to the COVID-19 pandemic, namely the Argentine, Finnish, Japanese, Thailand, Australian, and Malaysian Grands Prix, returned in 2022. Consequently, the Grands Prix held in 2021 that replaced the aforementioned cancelled races, namely the Doha, Styrian, Emilia Romagna, and Algarve Grands Prix, did not return in 2022.
- The previously mentioned Finnish Grand Prix was planned to return to the calendar after a 39-year absence. The venue hosting the round would have been the new Kymi Ring, instead of the Pyynikki Circuit used in 1962 and 1963 or the Imatra Circuit which hosted the round until 1982. The Grand Prix was included on both the 2020 and 2021 calendars, but both races were cancelled in response to the COVID-19 pandemic. However, the race scheduled for July was cancelled in May due to incomplete homologation works and the risks associated with the geopolitical situation in the region.
- The Indonesian Grand Prix returned to the calendar after a 24-year absence. The venue hosting the round was the new Mandalika International Street Circuit, instead of the Sentul International Circuit used in 1996 and 1997. The Grand Prix had been included in the 2021 calendar as a Reserve Grand Prix but was ultimately dropped before the end of the season.
- The Brazilian Grand Prix, which had previously been announced to return in 2022, was not included in the provisional calendar released on 7 October 2021.
- The Austrian Grand Prix used a new layout of the Red Bull Ring, wherein a chicane was added to the previous fast slight-left hander of turn 2. This was done to improve the overall safety of the track by greatly reducing the speed the riders take the turn. The final configuration was chosen among 15 proposals, with the track being 30 meters longer than the previous configurations.

== Results and standings ==
=== Grands Prix ===
Round	Grand Prix	Pole position	Fastest lap	Winning rider	Winning team	Winning constructor	Report
1	Qatar motorcycle Grand Prix	(Italy) Celestino Vietti	(Italy) Celestino Vietti	(Italy) Celestino Vietti	(Italy) Mooney VR46 Racing Team	(Germany) Kalex	Report
2	(Indonesia) Indonesian motorcycle Grand Prix	(United Kingdom) Jake Dixon	(Thailand) Somkiat Chantra	(Thailand) Somkiat Chantra	(Japan) Idemitsu Honda Team Asia	(Germany) Kalex	Report
3	(Argentina) Argentine Republic motorcycle Grand Prix	(Spain) Fermín Aldeguer	(Italy) Celestino Vietti	(Italy) Celestino Vietti	(Italy) Mooney VR46 Racing Team	(Germany) Kalex	Report
4	(United States) Motorcycle Grand Prix of the Americas	(United States) Cameron Beaubier	(Spain) Arón Canet	(Italy) Tony Arbolino	(Belgium) Elf Marc VDS Racing Team	(Germany) Kalex	Report
5	(Portugal) Portuguese motorcycle Grand Prix	(Spain) Arón Canet	(United States) Joe Roberts	(United States) Joe Roberts	(Italy) Italtrans Racing Team	(Germany) Kalex	Report
6	(Spain) Spanish motorcycle Grand Prix	(Japan) Ai Ogura	(United Kingdom) Sam Lowes	(Japan) Ai Ogura	(Japan) Idemitsu Honda Team Asia	(Germany) Kalex	Report
7	(France) French motorcycle Grand Prix	(Spain) Pedro Acosta	(Spain) Augusto Fernández	(Spain) Augusto Fernández	(Finland) Red Bull KTM Ajo	(Germany) Kalex	Report
8	(Italy) Italian motorcycle Grand Prix	(Spain) Arón Canet	(Spain) Augusto Fernández	(Spain) Pedro Acosta	(Finland) Red Bull KTM Ajo	(Germany) Kalex	Report
9	(Catalonia) Catalan motorcycle Grand Prix	(Italy) Celestino Vietti	(Spain) Arón Canet	(Italy) Celestino Vietti	(Italy) Mooney VR46 Racing Team	(Germany) Kalex	Report
10	(Germany) German motorcycle Grand Prix	(United Kingdom) Sam Lowes	(Spain) Augusto Fernández	(Spain) Augusto Fernández	(Finland) Red Bull KTM Ajo	(Germany) Kalex	Report
11	(Netherlands) Dutch TT	(United Kingdom) Jake Dixon	(Italy) Celestino Vietti	(Spain) Augusto Fernández	(Finland) Red Bull KTM Ajo	(Germany) Kalex	Report
12	(United Kingdom) British motorcycle Grand Prix	(Spain) Augusto Fernández	(Spain) Augusto Fernández	(Spain) Augusto Fernández	(Finland) Red Bull KTM Ajo	(Germany) Kalex	Report
13	(Austria) Austrian motorcycle Grand Prix	(Japan) Ai Ogura	(Italy) Celestino Vietti	(Japan) Ai Ogura	(Japan) Idemitsu Honda Team Asia	(Germany) Kalex	Report
14	San Marino and Rimini Riviera motorcycle Grand Prix	(Italy) Celestino Vietti	(Japan) Ai Ogura	(Spain) Alonso López	(Italy) +Ego Speed Up	(Italy) Boscoscuro	Report
15	Aragon motorcycle Grand Prix	(Spain) Augusto Fernández	(Spain) Pedro Acosta	(Spain) Pedro Acosta	(Finland) Red Bull KTM Ajo	(Germany) Kalex	Report
16	(Japan) Japanese motorcycle Grand Prix	(Spain) Arón Canet	(Spain) Augusto Fernández	(Japan) Ai Ogura	(Japan) Idemitsu Honda Team Asia	(Germany) Kalex	Report
17	Thailand motorcycle Grand Prix	(Thailand) Somkiat Chantra	(Italy) Tony Arbolino	(Italy) Tony Arbolino	(Belgium) Elf Marc VDS Racing Team	(Germany) Kalex	Report
18	(Australia) Australian motorcycle Grand Prix	(Spain) Fermín Aldeguer	(Spain) Alonso López	(Spain) Alonso López	(Italy) Beta Tools Speed Up	(Italy) Boscoscuro	Report
19	(Malaysia) Malaysian motorcycle Grand Prix	(Japan) Ai Ogura	(Italy) Tony Arbolino	(Italy) Tony Arbolino	(Belgium) Elf Marc VDS Racing Team	(Germany) Kalex	Report
20	Valencian Community motorcycle Grand Prix	(Spain) Alonso López	(United States) Cameron Beaubier	(Spain) Pedro Acosta	(Finland) Red Bull KTM Ajo	(Germany) Kalex	Report

=== Riders' standings ===
Scoring system

Points were awarded to the top fifteen finishers. A rider had to finish the race to earn points.

Position	1st	2nd	3rd	4th	5th	6th	7th	8th	9th	10th	11th	12th	13th	14th	15th
Points	25	20	16	13	11	10	9	8	7	6	5	4	3	2	1

Pos.	Rider	Bike	Team	QAT (Qatar)	INA (Indonesia)	ARG (Argentina)	AME (United States)	POR (Portugal)	SPA (Spain)	FRA (France)	ITA (Italy)	CAT (Catalonia)	GER (Germany)	NED (Netherlands)	GBR (United Kingdom)	AUT (Austria)	RSM (San Marino)	ARA (Aragon)	JPN (Japan)	THA‡ (Thailand)	AUS (Australia)	MAL (Malaysia)	VAL (Valencian Community)	Pts
1	(Spain) Augusto Fernández	Kalex	Red Bull KTM Ajo	4	5	Ret	9	Ret	4	1^{F}	5^{F}	3	1^{F}	1	1^{P F}	5	3	3^{P}	2^{F}	7	Ret	4	2	271.5
2	(Japan) Ai Ogura	Kalex	Idemitsu Honda Team Asia	6	6	3	2	Ret	1^{P}	5	3	7	8	2	4	1^{P}	5^{F}	4	1	6	11	Ret^{P}	Ret	242
3	(Spain) Arón Canet	Kalex	Flexbox HP40	2	3	4	Ret^{F}	Ret^{P}	2	2	Ret^{P}	2^{F}	9	DNS	5	6	2	2	Ret^{P}	3	9	8	Ret	200
4	(Italy) Tony Arbolino	Kalex	Elf Marc VDS Racing Team	5	8	6	1	Ret	3	Ret	4	10	10	7	12	Ret	7	5	6	1^{F}	Ret	1^{F}	3	191.5
5	(Spain) Pedro Acosta	Kalex	Red Bull KTM Ajo	12	9	7	Ret	Ret	20	Ret^{P}	1	6	2		DNS	4	6	1^{F}	7	16	2	Ret	1	177
6	(United Kingdom) Jake Dixon	Kalex	GasGas Aspar Team	11	Ret^{P}	5	3	Ret	Ret	21	6	4	11	3^{P}	3	3	Ret	Ret	4	4	3	3	7	168.5
7	(Italy) Celestino Vietti	Kalex	Mooney VR46 Racing Team	1^{P F}	2	1^{F}	Ret	2	6	8	Ret	1^{P}	Ret	4^{F}	6	Ret^{F}	Ret^{P}	10	Ret	10	Ret	Ret	Ret	165
8	(Spain) Alonso López	Boscoscuro	Speed Up Racing							Ret	8	8	7	6	2	7	1	Ret	3	5	1^{F}	2	Ret^{P}	155.5
9	(United States) Joe Roberts	Kalex	Italtrans Racing Team	8	11	13	8	1^{F}	8	7	2	Ret	13	8	7	14	9	9	12	8	Ret	Ret	15	131
10	(Thailand) Somkiat Chantra	Kalex	Idemitsu Honda Team Asia	DNS	1^{F}	2	Ret	Ret	Ret	3	Ret	12	15	13	13	2	8	7	5	Ret^{P}	8	Ret	Ret	128
11	(Germany) Marcel Schrötter	Kalex	Liqui Moly Intact GP	10	16	12	4	4	5	6	9	5	4	Ret	Ret	8	11	Ret	13	15	13	6	10	123.5
12	(Spain) Albert Arenas	Kalex	GasGas Aspar Team	13	10	8	11	Ret	9	19	10	Ret	6	Ret	Ret	9	4	Ret	8	14	14	13	5	90
13	(Netherlands) Bo Bendsneyder	Kalex	Pertamina Mandalika SAG Team	19	15	9	7	8	7	14	11	13	16	5	10	15	12	15	9	18	10	14	11	87
14	(Spain) Jorge Navarro	Kalex	Flexbox HP40	7	13	Ret	5	3	10	9	12	14	Ret	12	8	11	Ret	8	Ret	20	Ret			83
15	(Spain) Fermín Aldeguer	Boscoscuro	Speed Up Racing	16	7	Ret^{P}	Ret	7	Ret	Ret	14	15	5	11	15	Ret	Ret	6	Ret	Ret	4^{P}	10	4	80
16	(Spain) Manuel González	Kalex	Yamaha VR46 Master Camp Team	20	18	14	13	5	16	11	20	9	12	9	11	Ret	Ret	Ret	DNS	25	5	5	6	76
17	(United States) Cameron Beaubier	Kalex	American Racing	9	12	11	Ret^{P}	Ret	Ret	4	7	Ret	14	Ret	Ret	13	14	11	11	Ret	7	7	Ret^{F}	73
18	(Spain) Jeremy Alcoba	Kalex	Liqui Moly Intact GP	14	14	16	6	6	12	13	17	18	20	14	14	10	10	Ret	Ret	Ret	6	9	8	72
19	(United Kingdom) Sam Lowes	Kalex	Elf Marc VDS Racing Team	3	4	10	Ret	Ret	Ret^{F}	DNS	Ret	Ret	3^{P}	Ret	DNS				DNS	19	12	DNS		55
20	(Czech Republic) Filip Salač	Kalex	Gresini Racing Moto2	Ret	21	Ret	14	14	21	15	13	Ret	Ret	10	9	Ret	Ret	17	10	2	Ret	11	13	45
21	(Belgium) Barry Baltus	Kalex	RW Racing GP	Ret	DNS		10	9	14	Ret	16	17	Ret	15	16	12	13	13	14	12	Ret	DNS		30
22	(Italy) Lorenzo Dalla Porta	Kalex	Italtrans Racing Team	Ret	20	Ret	16	Ret	15	12	Ret	11	Ret	16	17	Ret	Ret	12	15	Ret	Ret	12	14	21
23	(Italy) Stefano Manzi	Kalex	Yamaha VR46 Master Camp Team						13	10		16												9
24	(Italy) Alessandro Zaccone	Kalex	Gresini Racing Moto2	22	24	Ret	Ret	15	11	18	19	Ret	19	Ret	18	Ret	15	14	Ret	21	16	Ret	16	9
25	(Thailand) Keminth Kubo	Kalex	Yamaha VR46 Master Camp Team	23	Ret	19		12	WD		22		Ret	21	23	Ret	Ret	Ret	18	9	Ret	16	17	7.5
26	(Australia) Senna Agius	Kalex	Elf Marc VDS Racing Team													17	Ret	16					9	7
27	(Italy) Romano Fenati	Boscoscuro	Speed Up Racing	15	19	18	15	11	Ret															7
28	(Argentina) Gabriel Rodrigo	Kalex	Pertamina Mandalika SAG Team	21	22	Ret	Ret	10	17	Ret	DNS													6
29	(United States) Sean Dylan Kelly	Kalex	American Racing	25	Ret	Ret	17	13	22	20	23	21	17	19	22	Ret	Ret	21	19	11	18	18	18	5.5
30	(Spain) Marcos Ramírez	MV Agusta	MV Agusta Forward Racing	17	17	15	12	Ret	Ret	Ret	Ret	24	Ret	17	Ret	19	16	18	20	23	17	17	20	5
31	(Spain) Borja Gómez	Kalex	Flexbox HP40																			20	12	4
32	(Japan) Taiga Hada	Kalex	Pertamina Mandalika SAG Team													22	17	Ret	17	13	15	15	22	3.5
33	(Italy) Mattia Pasini	Kalex	GasGas Aspar Team								15						Ret							1
33	(Italy) Mattia Pasini	Kalex	RW Racing GP																				Ret	1
34	(Netherlands) Zonta van den Goorbergh	Kalex	RW Racing GP	24	23	Ret	Ret	Ret	19	17	21	20	18	18	Ret	18	Ret	Ret	16	17	WD		21	0
35	(Italy) Simone Corsi	MV Agusta	MV Agusta Forward Racing	18	Ret	17	Ret	Ret	18	16	Ret	22	Ret	20	20	20	Ret	19	Ret	24	Ret		Ret	0
36	(Italy) Niccolò Antonelli	Kalex	Mooney VR46 Racing Team	26	25	Ret	Ret	Ret	23	Ret	18	19	Ret	Ret	19	16	Ret	20	Ret	22	Ret	21	Ret	0
37	(Spain) Álex Escrig	MV Agusta	MV Agusta Forward Racing																				19	0
38	(Malaysia) Kasma Daniel	Kalex	Petronas MIE Racing RW																			19		0
39	(United Kingdom) Rory Skinner	Kalex	American Racing												21	21								0
40	(Spain) Álex Toledo	Kalex	Pertamina Mandalika SAG Team									Ret	21	22										0
41	(Malaysia) Azroy Hakeem Anuar	Kalex	Petronas RW Racing																			22		0
42	(Poland) Piotr Biesiekirski	Kalex	Pertamina Mandalika SAG Team									23			24									0
	(Spain) David Sanchís	MV Agusta	MV Agusta Forward Racing																			Ret		0
Pos.	Rider	Bike	Team	QAT (Qatar)	INA (Indonesia)	ARG (Argentina)	AME (United States)	POR (Portugal)	SPA (Spain)	FRA (France)	ITA (Italy)	CAT (Catalonia)	GER (Germany)	NED (Netherlands)	GBR (United Kingdom)	AUT (Austria)	RSM (San Marino)	ARA (Aragon)	JPN (Japan)	THA‡ (Thailand)	AUS (Australia)	MAL (Malaysia)	VAL (Valencian Community)	Pts

Race key
Colour	Result
Gold	Winner
Silver	2nd place
Bronze	3rd place
Green	Points finish
Blue	Non-points finish
Blue	Non-classified finish (NC)
Purple	Retired (Ret)
Red	Did not qualify (DNQ)
Black	Disqualified (DSQ)
White	Did not start (DNS)
White	Withdrew (WD)
White	Race cancelled (C)
Blank	Did not practice (DNP)
Blank	Excluded (EX)
Blank	Did not arrive (DNA)
Blank	Did not enter (empty cell)
Annotation	Meaning
P	Pole position
F	Fastest lap
Rider key
Colour	Meaning
Light blue	Rookie rider

- ‡ – Half points were awarded during the Thailand Grand Prix as less than two-thirds of the scheduled race distance (but at least three full laps) was completed.

=== Constructors' standings ===
Each constructor received the same number of points as their best placed rider in each race.

Pos.	Constructor	QAT (Qatar)	INA (Indonesia)	ARG (Argentina)	AME (United States)	POR (Portugal)	SPA (Spain)	FRA (France)	ITA (Italy)	CAT (Catalonia)	GER (Germany)	NED (Netherlands)	GBR (United Kingdom)	AUT (Austria)	RSM (San Marino)	ARA (Aragon)	JPN (Japan)	THA‡ (Thailand)	AUS (Australia)	MAL (Malaysia)	VAL (Valencian Community)	Pts
1	(Germany) Kalex	1	1	1	1	1	1	1	1	1	1	1	1	1	2	1	1	1	2	1	1	477.5
2	(Italy) Boscoscuro	15	7	18	15	7	Ret	Ret	8	8	5	6	2	7	1	6	3	5	1	2	4	200.5
3	(Italy) MV Agusta	17	17	15	12	Ret	18	16	Ret	22	Ret	17	20	19	16	18	20	23	17	17	19	5
Pos.	Constructor	QAT (Qatar)	INA (Indonesia)	ARG (Argentina)	AME (United States)	POR (Portugal)	SPA (Spain)	FRA (France)	ITA (Italy)	CAT (Catalonia)	GER (Germany)	NED (Netherlands)	GBR (United Kingdom)	AUT (Austria)	RSM (San Marino)	ARA (Aragon)	JPN (Japan)	THA‡ (Thailand)	AUS (Australia)	MAL (Malaysia)	VAL (Valencian Community)	Pts

- ‡ – Half points were awarded during the Thailand Grand Prix as less than two-thirds of the scheduled race distance (but at least three full laps) was completed.

=== Teams' standings ===
The teams' standings were based on results obtained by regular and substitute riders; wild-card entries were ineligible.

Pos.	Team	Bike No.	QAT (Qatar)	INA (Indonesia)	ARG (Argentina)	AME (United States)	POR (Portugal)	SPA (Spain)	FRA (France)	ITA (Italy)	CAT (Catalonia)	GER (Germany)	NED (Netherlands)	GBR (United Kingdom)	AUT (Austria)	RSM (San Marino)	ARA (Aragon)	JPN (Japan)	THA‡ (Thailand)	AUS (Australia)	MAL (Malaysia)	VAL (Valencian Community)	Pts
1	(Finland) Red Bull KTM Ajo	37	4	5	Ret	9	Ret	4	1^{F}	5^{F}	3	1^{F}	1	1^{P F}	5	3	3^{P}	2^{F}	7	Ret	4	2	448.5
1	(Finland) Red Bull KTM Ajo	51	12	9	7	Ret	Ret	20	Ret^{P}	1	6	2		DNS	4	6	1^{F}	7	16	2	Ret	1	448.5
2	(Japan) Idemitsu Honda Team Asia	35	DNS	1^{F}	2	Ret	Ret	Ret	3	Ret	12	15	13	13	2	8	7	5	Ret^{P}	8	Ret	Ret	370
2	(Japan) Idemitsu Honda Team Asia	79	6	6	3	2	Ret	1^{P}	5	3	7	8	2	4	1^{P}	5^{F}	4	1	6	11	Ret^{P}	Ret	370
3	(Spain) Flexbox HP40	9	7	13	Ret	5	3	10	9	12	14	Ret	12	8	11	Ret	8	Ret	20	Ret			287
3	(Spain) Flexbox HP40	40	2	3	4	Ret^{F}	Ret^{P}	2	2	Ret^{P}	2^{F}	9	DNS	5	6	2	2	Ret^{P}	3	9	8	Ret	287
3	(Spain) Flexbox HP40	72																			20	12	287
4	(Spain) GasGas Aspar Team	75	13	10	8	11	Ret	9	19	10	Ret	6	Ret	Ret	9	4	Ret	8	14	14	13	5	258.5
4	(Spain) GasGas Aspar Team	96	11	Ret^{P}	5	3	Ret	Ret	21	6	4	11	3^{P}	3	3	Ret	Ret	4	4	3	3	7	258.5
5	(Belgium) Elf Marc VDS Racing Team	8													17	Ret	16					9	253.5
5	(Belgium) Elf Marc VDS Racing Team	14	5	8	6	1	Ret	3	Ret	4	10	10	7	12	Ret	7	5	6	1^{F}	Ret	1^{F}	3	253.5
5	(Belgium) Elf Marc VDS Racing Team	22	3	4	10	Ret	Ret	Ret^{F}	DNS	Ret	Ret	3^{P}	Ret	DNS				DNS	19	12	DNS		253.5
6	(Italy) Speed Up Racing	5	15	19	18	15	11	Ret															242.5
6	(Italy) Speed Up Racing	21							Ret	8	8	7	6	2	7	1	Ret	3	5	1^{F}	2	Ret^{P}	242.5
6	(Italy) Speed Up Racing	54	16	7	Ret^{P}	Ret	7	Ret	Ret	14	15	5	11	15	Ret	Ret	6	Ret	Ret	4^{P}	10	4	242.5
7	(Germany) Liqui Moly Intact GP	23	10	16	12	4	4	5	6	9	5	4	Ret	Ret	8	11	Ret	13	15	13	6	10	195.5
7	(Germany) Liqui Moly Intact GP	52	14	14	16	6	6	12	13	17	18	20	14	14	10	10	Ret	Ret	Ret	6	9	8	195.5
8	(Italy) Mooney VR46 Racing Team	13	1^{P F}	2	1^{F}	Ret	2	6	8	Ret	1^{P}	Ret	4^{F}	6	Ret^{F}	Ret^{P}	10	Ret	10	Ret	Ret	Ret	165
8	(Italy) Mooney VR46 Racing Team	28	26	25	Ret	Ret	Ret	23	Ret	18	19	Ret	Ret	19	16	Ret	20	Ret	22	Ret	21	Ret	165
9	(Italy) Italtrans Racing Team	16	8	11	13	8	1^{F}	8	7	2	Ret	13	8	7	14	9	9	12	8	Ret	Ret	15	152
9	(Italy) Italtrans Racing Team	19	Ret	20	Ret	16	Ret	15	12	Ret	11	Ret	16	17	Ret	Ret	12	15	Ret	Ret	12	14	152
10	(Indonesia) Pertamina Mandalika SAG Team	2	21	22	Ret	Ret	10	17	Ret	DNS													96.5
10	(Indonesia) Pertamina Mandalika SAG Team	29													22	17	Ret	17	13	15	15	22	96.5
10	(Indonesia) Pertamina Mandalika SAG Team	55									Ret	21	22										96.5
10	(Indonesia) Pertamina Mandalika SAG Team	64	19	15	9	7	8	7	14	11	13	16	5	10	15	12	15	9	18	10	14	11	96.5
10	(Indonesia) Pertamina Mandalika SAG Team	74												22									96.5
11	(Italy) Yamaha VR46 Master Camp Team	18	20	18	14	13	5	16	11	20	9	12	9	11	Ret	Ret	Ret	DNS	25	5	5	6	92.5
11	(Italy) Yamaha VR46 Master Camp Team	62						13	10		16												92.5
11	(Italy) Yamaha VR46 Master Camp Team	81	23	Ret	19		12	WD		22		Ret	21	23	Ret	Ret	Ret	18	9	Ret	16	17	92.5
12	(United States) American Racing	4	25	Ret	Ret	17	13	22	20	23	21	17	19	22	Ret	Ret	21	19	11	18	18	18	78.5
12	(United States) American Racing	6	9	12	11	Ret^{P}	Ret	Ret	4	7	Ret	14	Ret	Ret	13	14	11	11	Ret	7	7	Ret^{F}	78.5
13	(Italy) Gresini Racing Moto2	12	Ret	21	Ret	14	14	21	15	13	Ret	Ret	10	9	Ret	Ret	17	10	2	Ret	11	13	54
13	(Italy) Gresini Racing Moto2	61	22	24	Ret	Ret	15	11	18	19	Ret	19	Ret	18	Ret	15	14	Ret	21	16	Ret	16	54
14	(Netherlands) RW Racing GP (Netherlands) Petronas RW Racing	7	Ret	DNS		10	9	14	Ret	16	17	Ret	15	16	12	13	13	14	12	Ret	DNS		30
14	(Netherlands) RW Racing GP (Netherlands) Petronas RW Racing	11																				Ret	30
14	(Netherlands) RW Racing GP (Netherlands) Petronas RW Racing	20																			22		30
14	(Netherlands) RW Racing GP (Netherlands) Petronas RW Racing	84	24	23	Ret	Ret	Ret	19	17	21	20	18	18	Ret	18	Ret	Ret	16	17	WD		21	30
15	(Switzerland) MV Agusta Forward Racing	24	18	Ret	17	Ret	Ret	18	16	Ret	22	Ret	20	20	20	Ret	19	Ret	24	Ret		Ret	5
15	(Switzerland) MV Agusta Forward Racing	42	17	17	15	12	Ret	Ret	Ret	Ret	24	Ret	17	Ret	19	16	18	20	23	17	17	20	5
15	(Switzerland) MV Agusta Forward Racing	98																			Ret		5
Pos.	Team	Bike No.	QAT (Qatar)	INA (Indonesia)	ARG (Argentina)	AME (United States)	POR (Portugal)	SPA (Spain)	FRA (France)	ITA (Italy)	CAT (Catalonia)	GER (Germany)	NED (Netherlands)	GBR (United Kingdom)	AUT (Austria)	RSM (San Marino)	ARA (Aragon)	JPN (Japan)	THA‡ (Thailand)	AUS (Australia)	MAL (Malaysia)	VAL (Valencian Community)	Pts

- ‡ – Half points were awarded during the Thailand Grand Prix as less than two-thirds of the scheduled race distance (but at least three full laps) was completed.
