= Filip Salač =

Czech motorcycle racer (born 2001)

- Salač at the 2026 Czech Grand Prix
- Nationality: Czech
- Born: 12 December 2001 (age 24); Mladá Boleslav, Czech Republic
- Current team: OnlyFans American Racing Team
- Bike number: 12
Motorcycle racing career statistics
Moto2 World Championship
Active years	2022–
Manufacturers	Kalex (2022–2024, 2026); Boscoscuro (2025)
2025 championship position	17th (85 pts)
Starts / Wins / Podiums / Poles / F. laps / Points; 96 / 1 / 8 / 2 / 2 / 475
Moto3 World Championship
Active years	2018–2021
Manufacturers	KTM (2018–2019, 2021); Honda (2020–2021)
Championships	0
2021 championship position	16th (71 pts)
Starts / Wins / Podiums / Poles / F. laps / Points; 50 / 0 / 1 / 1 / 0 / 133
Supersport 300 World Championship
Active years	2020
Manufacturers	Kawasaki
Championships	0
2020 championship position	34th (4 pts)
Starts / Wins / Podiums / Poles / F. laps / Points; 2 / 0 / 0 / 0 / 0 / 4

Filip Salač (born 12 December 2001) is a Czech motorcycle rider, competing in the 2026 Moto2 World Championship for OnlyFans American Racing Team.

== Career ==
=== Junior career ===
Salač competed full time in the 2016 Red Bull MotoGP Rookies Cup, scoring no podiums, 75 points, and finished ninth in the final standings. He also made four race appearances in the 2016 FIM CEV Moto3 Junior World Championship, scoring one point in the race at Portimão.

Salač split the same two series again next year, finishing with 12 points in the 2017 FIM CEV Moto3 Junior World Championship, and five top-six finishes in the 2017 Red Bull MotoGP Rookies Cup, including a second place podium in Jerez. He finished 27th, and 13th in the standings respectively.

Salač improved from his previous seasons in both categories, scoring points eight times in the 2018 FIM CEV Moto3 Junior World Championship, seven of which were top-ten finishes, finishing 11th in the standings, with 52 points. In the 2018 Red Bull MotoGP Rookies Cup, he scored five podiums, two second places at Assen and Misano, and three third places at Jerez, the Sachsenring, and the Red Bull Ring. He finished the season fourth in the standings, with 151 points.

=== Moto3 World Championship ===
Salač made his Grand Prix racing debut as a wildcard, at his home GP in Brno in 2018, finishing the race in 24th place.

==== Redox PrüstelGP (2019) ====
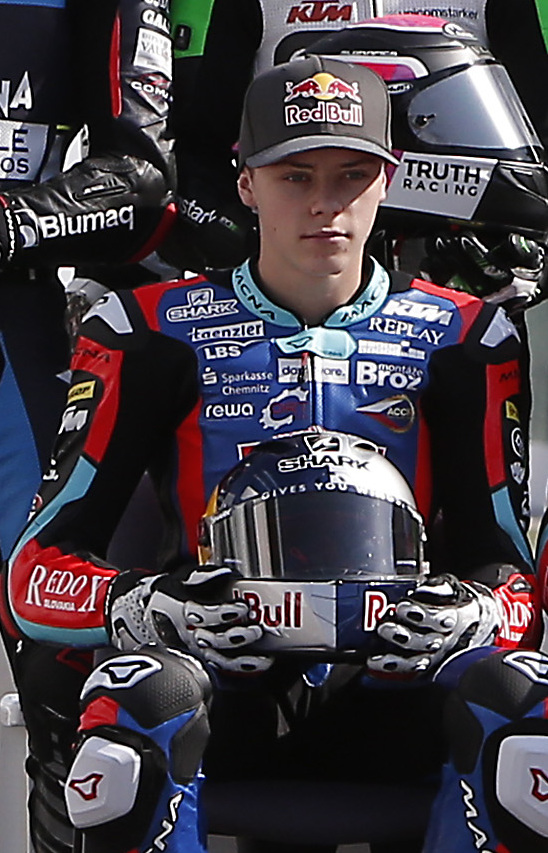
Salač in 2019

Salač competed full time in the 2019 Moto3 World Championship alongside compatriot Jakub Kornfeil at Prüstel GP.

Salač scored points in seven races during the year, his season's best finishes being a ninth place in Rimini, and a fifth place in the season closing race in Valencia. He ended the season 23rd in the standings, with 32 points.

==== Rivacold Snipers Team (2020–2021) ====
Switching from Prüstel to the Rivacold Snipers team for the 2020 Moto3 World Championship, Salač had similar performances as the year prior. He scored points in six races, his season's best results were an eighth place in Qatar, and a ninth place in Valencia, and ended the season 21st in the standings, with 30 points.

The 2021 Moto3 World Championship would see Salač ride for two teams. He started the season with the Rivacold Snipers outfit, scoring his first career podium in the category with a second place in Le Mans, and also earning his first pole position in Moto3 at the Sachsenring. He could not finish the race in Germany however, as technical issues forced him to retire. Salač was so upset with the team, having already retired in Doha and Barcelona in previous races, that following his German retirement, he asked for the termination of his contract with the team. He was replaced by Alberto Surra.

==== CarXpert Prüstel GP (2021) ====
Following his decision to leave the Snipers team, and the sudden death of Jason Dupasquier in Italy freeing up a spot at Prüstel GP, the two parties agreed to a contract, and Salač would ride for Prüstel for the remaining nine races of the season. He finished in the points in the first three races, before crashing out in the next three, but ended the season well, with two tenth places in Misano and Portimão, before capping off the season with a fourth place in the season closer at Valencia. Salač finished 16th in the championship standings, with 71 points.

=== Moto2 World Championship ===
==== Gresini Racing Moto2 (2022–2023) ====
In September 2021, it was announced that Salač would move up to Moto2, with the Gresini Racing team for the 2022 season.

In 2023, Salač was awarded the Golden Handlebar Award.

==== Elf Marc VDS Racing Team (2024–2025) ====
Elf Racing Team Marc VDS has announced that Salač would join their Moto2 project for the 2024 Moto2 World Championship.

==== American Racing Team (2026-) ====
Salač joined the OnlyFans American Racing Team for the 2026 season. After his podium at the Czech GP, he renewed his agreement with the team for 2027. He achieved his first win at the 2026 British GP.

== Career statistics ==
=== Red Bull MotoGP Rookies Cup ===
==== Races by year ====
(key) (Races in bold indicate pole position; races in italics indicate fastest lap)

Year	1	2	3	4	5	6	7	8	9	10	11	12	13	Pos	Pts
2016	JER1; 15	JER2; Ret	ASS1; 9	ASS2; 6	SAC1; 10	SAC2; 8	RBR1; 11	RBR2; 10	BRN1; Ret	BRN2; 11	MIS; 11	ARA1; 5	ARA2; 5	9th	75
2017	JER1; 4	JER2; 2	ASS1	ASS2	SAC1	SAC2	BRN1; Ret	BRN2; DNS	RBR1	RBR2	MIS; 5	ARA1; 6	ARA2; 5	13th	65
2018	JER1; 3	JER2; 4	MUG; 10	ASS1; 5	ASS2; 2	SAC1; 4	SAC2; 3	RBR1; 5	RBR2; 3	MIS; 2	ARA1; Ret	ARA2; 7		4th	151

=== FIM CEV Moto3 Junior World Championship ===
==== Races by year ====
(key) Races in bold indicate pole position; races in italics indicate fastest lap)

Year	Bike	1	2	3	4	5	6	7	8	9	10	11	12	Pos	Pts
2016	KTM	VAL1	VAL2	LMS	ARA	CAT1	CAT2	ALB; Ret	ALG; 15	JER1	JER2	VAL1; 20	VAL2; 21	37th	1
2017	KTM	ALB; Ret	LMS; 11	CAT1; DNS	CAT2; DNS	VAL1	VAL2	EST	JER1; 19	JER2; 13	ARA; 12	VAL1; DNQ	VAL2; DNQ	27th	12
2018	KTM	EST; 8	VAL1; 9	VAL2; Ret	LMS; 18	CAT1; 22	CAT2; 16	ARA; 9	JER1; 9	JER2; 8	ALB; 10	VAL1; 8	VAL2; 15	11th	52

=== Grand Prix motorcycle racing ===
==== By season ====
Season	Class	Motorcycle	Team	Race	Win	Podium	Pole	FLap	Pts	Plcd
2018	Moto3	KTM	Cuna de Campeones Czech Talent Team	1	0	0	0	0	0	44th
2019	Moto3	KTM	Redox PrüstelGP	19	0	0	0	0	32	23rd
2020	Moto3	Honda	Rivacold Snipers Team	13	0	0	0	0	30	21st
2021	Moto3	Honda	Rivacold Snipers Team	8	0	1	1	0	48	16th
2021	Moto3	KTM	CarXpert Prüstel GP	9	0	0	0	0	23	16th
2022	Moto2	Kalex	Gresini Racing Moto2	20	0	1	0	0	45	20th
2023	Moto2	Kalex	QJmotor Gresini Moto2	19	0	1	1	0	110	11th
2024	Moto2	Kalex	Elf Marc VDS Racing Team	17	0	1	0	0	73	16th
2025	Moto2	Boscoscuro	Elf Marc VDS Racing Team	21	0	0	0	0	85	17th
2026	Moto2	Kalex	OnlyFans American Racing Team	19	1	5	1	2	162*	7th*
Total				**146**	**1**	**9**	**3**	**2**	**608**	

==== By class ====
Class	Seasons	1st GP	1st pod	1st win	Race	Win	Podiums	Pole	FLap	Pts
Moto3	2018–2021	2018 Czech Republic	2021 France		50	0	1	1	0	133
Moto2	2022–present	2022 Qatar	2022 Thailand	2026 British	96	1	8	2	2	475
Total	2018–present				**146**	**1**	**9**	**3**	**2**	**608**

==== Races by year ====
(key) (Races in bold indicate pole position; races in italics indicate fastest lap)

Year	Class	Bike	1	2	3	4	5	6	7	8	9	10	11	12	13	14	15	16	17	18	19	20	21	22	Pos	Pts
2018	Moto3	KTM	QAT	ARG	AME	SPA	FRA	ITA	CAT	NED	GER	CZE; 24	AUT	GBR	RSM	ARA	THA	JPN	AUS	MAL	VAL				44th	0
2019	Moto3	KTM	QAT; 21	ARG; 25	AME; 20	SPA; Ret	FRA; 15	ITA; 20	CAT; Ret	NED; 14	GER; 13	CZE; Ret	AUT; 19	GBR; 21	RSM; 9	ARA; 18	THA; 11	JPN; 22	AUS; Ret	MAL; 13	VAL; 5				23rd	32
2020	Moto3	Honda	QAT; 8	SPA; Ret	ANC; Ret	CZE; 25	AUT; Ret	STY; 12	RSM; 20	EMI; 16	CAT; 12	FRA; 12	ARA; 16	TER; 13	EUR; 9	VAL; DNS	POR								21st	30
2021	Moto3	Honda	QAT; 13	DOH; Ret	POR; 13	SPA; 12	FRA; 2	ITA; 11	CAT; Ret	**GER**; Ret	NED														16th	71
2021	Moto3	KTM										STY; 11	AUT; 12	GBR; 14	ARA; Ret	RSM; Ret	AME; Ret	EMI; 10	ALR; 10	VAL; 4					16th	71
2022	Moto2	Kalex	QAT; Ret	INA; 21	ARG; Ret	AME; 14	POR; 14	SPA; 21	FRA; 15	ITA; 13	CAT; Ret	GER; Ret	NED; 10	GBR; 9	AUT; Ret	RSM; Ret	ARA; 17	JPN; 10	THA; 2^{‡}	AUS; Ret	MAL; 11	VAL; 13			20th	45
2023	Moto2	Kalex	**POR**; 4	ARG; 7	AME; 5	SPA; 9	FRA; 2	ITA; 7	GER; 13	NED; Ret	GBR; 13	AUT; 7	CAT; Ret	RSM; 9	IND; 10	JPN; 5	INA; Ret	AUS; Ret	THA; 17	MAL; 14	QAT; DNS	VAL; 17			11th	110
2024	Moto2	Kalex	QAT; 21	POR	AME; 15	SPA; 11	FRA; 12	CAT; 12	ITA; Ret	NED; DNS	GER	GBR; Ret	AUT; 10	ARA; 11	RSM; 7	EMI; 10	INA; 15	JPN; 3	AUS; 14	THA; 14	MAL; 15	SLD; 5			16th	73
2025	Moto2	Boscoscuro	THA; 9	ARG; Ret	AME; Ret	QAT; 10	SPA; 10	FRA; 7	GBR; 7	ARA; 5	ITA; 12	NED; Ret	GER; 10	CZE; 8	AUT; 11	HUN; 8	CAT; Ret	RSM; 18	JPN; 13	INA; Ret	AUS; DNS	MAL; Ret	POR; 15	VAL; 14	17th	85
2026	Moto2	Kalex	THA; 19	BRA; 15	USA; 21	SPA; 14	FRA; 9	CAT; 7	ITA; 5	HUN; 2	CZE; 3	NED; 8	GER; 7	GBR; 1	ARA; Ret	RSM; Ret	**AUT**; 2	JPN; 3	INA; 7	AUS; C	MAL; 14	QAT; 9	POR	VAL	7th*	162*

^{‡} Half points awarded as less than two thirds of the race distance (but at least three full laps) was completed.
* Season still in progress.

=== Supersport 300 World Championship ===
==== By season ====
Year	Motorcycle	Team	Race	Win	Podium	Pole	FLap	Pts	Plcd
2020	Kawasaki Ninja 400	ACCR Czech Talent Team - Willi Race	2	0	0	0	0	4	34th
Total			**2**	**0**	**0**	**0**	**0**	**4**	

==== Races by year ====
(key) (Races in bold indicate pole position; races in italics indicate fastest lap)

Year	Bike	1	2	3	4	5	6	7	8	9	10	11	12	13	14	Pos	Pts
2020	Kawasaki	SPA	SPA	POR	POR	SPA	SPA	SPA; 11	SPA; NC	SPA	SPA	FRA	FRA	POR	POR	34th	4
