= 2022 Indonesian motorcycle Grand Prix =

Second round of the 2022 Grand Prix motorcycle racing season

(Indonesia) 2022 Indonesian Grand Prix
Race details
- Race 2 of 20 races in the 2022 Grand Prix motorcycle racing season
- Date: 20 March 2022
- Official name: Pertamina Grand Prix of Indonesia
- Location: Pertamina Mandalika International Circuit; Mandalika, Indonesia
- Course: Street circuit; 4.301 km (2.673 mi)

MotoGP
Pole position
| Rider | (France) Fabio Quartararo | Yamaha |
| Time | 1:31.067 | |
Fastest lap
| Rider | (France) Fabio Quartararo | Yamaha |
| Time | 1:38.749 on lap 17 | |
Podium
| First | (Portugal) Miguel Oliveira | KTM |
| Second | (France) Fabio Quartararo | Yamaha |
| Third | (France) Johann Zarco | Ducati |

Moto2
Pole position
| Rider | (United Kingdom) Jake Dixon | Kalex |
| Time | 1:35.799 | |
Fastest lap
| Rider | (Thailand) Somkiat Chantra | Kalex |
| Time | 1:35.591 on lap 12 | |
Podium
| First | (Thailand) Somkiat Chantra | Kalex |
| Second | (Italy) Celestino Vietti | Kalex |
| Third | (Spain) Arón Canet | Kalex |

Moto3
Pole position
| Rider | (Spain) Carlos Tatay | CFMoto |
| Time | 1:41.232 | |
Fastest lap
| Rider | (Spain) Jaume Masià | KTM |
| Time | 1:40.197 on lap 4 | |
Podium
| First | (Italy) Dennis Foggia | Honda |
| Second | (Spain) Izan Guevara | Gas Gas |
| Third | (Spain) Carlos Tatay | CFMoto |

The 2022 Indonesian motorcycle Grand Prix (officially known as the Pertamina Grand Prix of Indonesia) was the second round of the 2022 Grand Prix motorcycle racing season. It was held at the Pertamina Mandalika International Circuit in Mandalika on 20 March 2022.

On the Wednesday prior to race weekend, 20 MotoGP riders paraded on race machines through Jakarta city streets together with the Indonesian President Joko Widodo on a road machine.

In the Moto2 class, Somkiat Chantra won the race in mixed conditions after starting from fourth place on the grid. It was both Chantra's and a Thai rider's first victory in Grand Prix motorcycle racing.

== Background ==
The Indonesian Grand Prix returned to the championship calendar after an absence of 25 years at the new Pertamina Mandalika International Circuit in Mandalika. On the Wednesday prior to race weekend, 20 MotoGP class riders met with Indonesian President Joko Widodo at the Merdeka Palace, then paraded through Jakarta streets on race machines, together with the President who rode a road machine. Roads were closed for the occasion, and fans lined the streets.

Previously, the two world championship events in 1996 and 1997 were held at the Sentul International Circuit.

=== Riders' entries ===
In MotoGP and Moto2 classes the riders and teams were the same as the season entry list with no additional stand-in riders for the race.

In the Moto3 class, as in the Qatar round, Taiyo Furusato missed the round after having surgery due to a right ankle injury; he was not replaced. Gerard Riu replaced David Muñoz as Muñoz was under the minimum age.

=== MotoGP Championship standings before the race ===
After winning the Qatar Grand Prix, Enea Bastianini lead the riders' standings with 25 points, followed by Brad Binder (20), Pol Espargaró (16), Aleix Espargaró (13) and Marc Márquez (11). In the constructors' classification, Ducati lead at 25 points, followed by KTM at 20 points. Honda was third at 16 points, ahead of Aprilia (13), Suzuki (11) and Yamaha (7). In the Team Championship standings, Repsol Honda lead with 27 points, 2 more than Gresini Racing and 7 more than Red Bull KTM Factory Racing. Team Suzuki Ecstar and Aprilia Racing were fourth and fifth, respectively at 19 and 17 points.

Márquez suffered a concussion during the warmup before the race, and had to be transferred to a local hospital in Lombok, thus ruling him out of the race.

=== Moto2 Championship standings before the race ===
The victory of the opening round earned Celestino Vietti the top of the standings, with 25 points; the other riders on the podium, Arón Canet and Sam Lowes, scored 20 and 16 points, with Augusto Fernández and Tony Arbolino fourth and fifth with 13 and 11 points respectively. The constructors' classification was dominated by Kalex with 25 points, with Boscoscuro following with only 1 point. The team championship standings were led by Flexbox HP40 with 29 points, followed by 2 and 4 points respectively by Elf Marc VDS Racing Team and Mooney VR46 Racing Team. Red Bull KTM Ajo was fourth at 17 points, ahead of Idemitsu Honda Team Asia at 10 points.

=== Moto3 Championship standings before the race ===
Andrea Migno, after the victory in Qatar, is first in the riders' standings with 25 points, 4 and 9 more than Sergio García and Kaito Toba, followed by Deniz Öncü and John McPhee with 13 and 11 points. In the constructors' classification, Honda leads with 25 points, followed by Gas Gas (20), KTM (16), Husqvarna (13) and CFMoto (11). In the team championship standings, Gaviota GasGas Aspar Team leads with 28 points, 3 more than the Rivacold Snipers Team; 17 points followed by CIP Green Power and MT Helmets - MSI. Red Bull KTM Tech3 is fifth at 15 points.

== Free practice ==
=== MotoGP ===
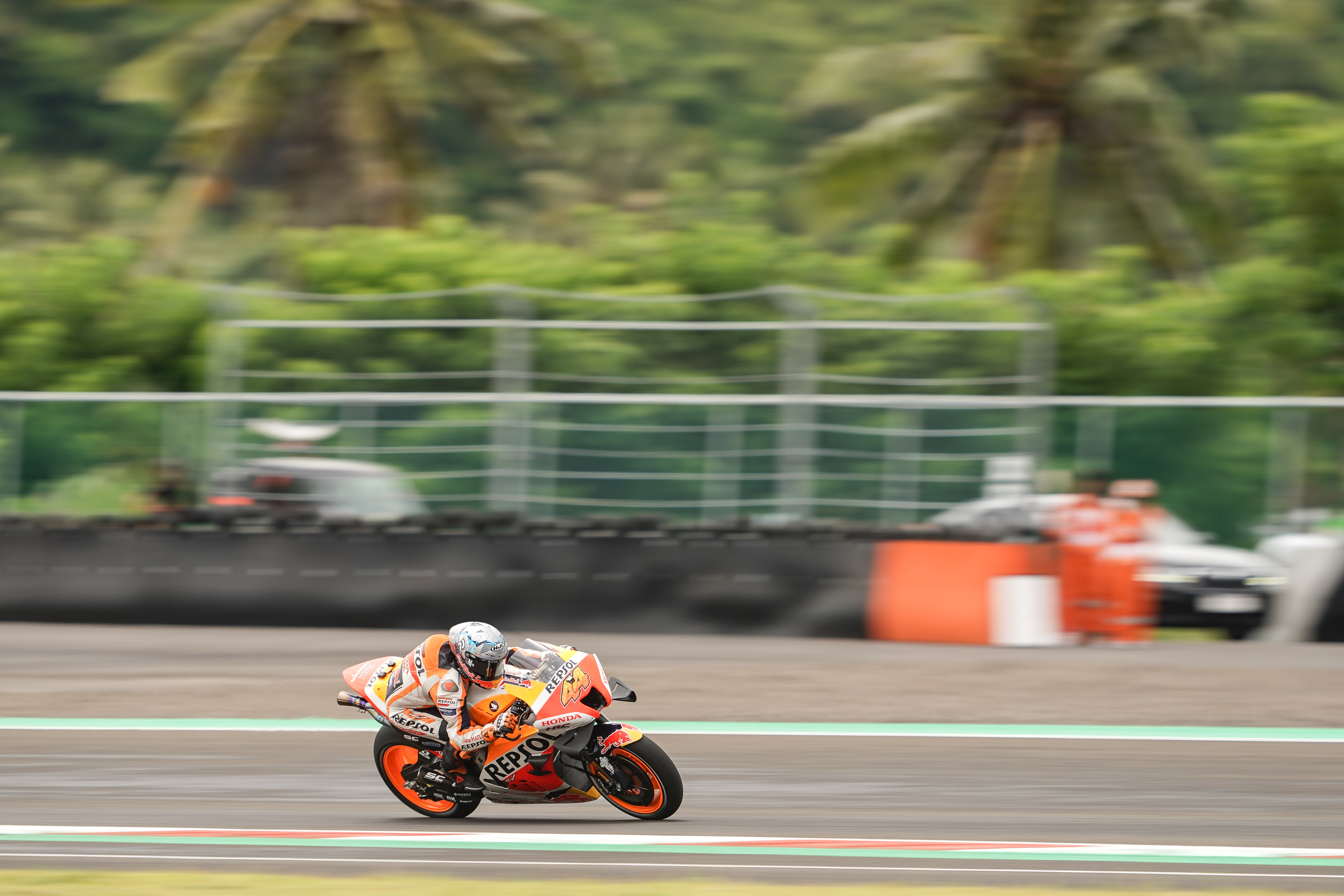
Pol Espargaro during Free Practice 2 of Indonesian motorcycle Grand Prix 2022.

In the first session, Pol Espargaró was the fastest, ahead of Miguel Oliveira and Marc Márquez. In the second session, the Yamaha took the lead, with Fabio Quartararo preceding Franco Morbidelli; third was Johann Zarco's Ducati. The third session, held in wet-dry conditions, Marc Márquez finished in the lead, with Francesco Bagnaia and Marco Bezzecchi right behind. In the combined times table, there are some big names who miss the top 10 and are forced to compete in Q1: Pol Espargaró, Marc Márquez, Francesco Bagnaia and Joan Mir.

In the fourth session, the three fastest bikers were Franco Morbidelli, Bezzecchi and Johann Zarco.

=== Moto2 ===
Sam Lowes was the fastest in the first session, ahead of Joe Roberts and Tony Arbolino. In the second session, Jake Dixon finished in the lead, with Celestino Vietti and Lowes second and third. The third session, held on a wet track, Fermín Aldeguer set the best time ahead of Augusto Fernández and Dixon.

=== Moto3 ===
The first session saw Alberto Surra finish in the lead, with Deniz Öncü and Izan Guevara second and third respectively. In the second session, Andrea Migno preceded Carlos Tatay and Dennis Foggia. Migno was also the fastest in the third session, held on a wet track, ahead of Surra and Tatsuki Suzuki.

== Qualifying ==
=== MotoGP ===
Fastest session lap

| Pos. | No. | Biker | Constructor | Qualifying times | | Final grid | Row |
| Pos. | No. | Biker | Constructor | Q1 | Q2 | Final grid | Row |
|---|---|---|---|---|---|---|---|
| 1 | 20 | (France) Fabio Quartararo | Yamaha | Qualified in Q2 | 1:31.067 | 1 | 1 |
| 2 | 89 | (Spain) Jorge Martín | Ducati | Qualified in Q2 | 1:31.280 | 2 | 1 |
| 3 | 5 | (France) Johann Zarco | Ducati | Qualified in Q2 | 1:31.378 | 3 | 1 |
| 4 | 33 | (South Africa) Brad Binder | KTM | Qualified in Q2 | 1:31.433 | 4 | 2 |
| 5 | 23 | (Italy) Enea Bastianini | Ducati | Qualified in Q2 | 1:31.507 | 5 | 2 |
| 6 | 63 | (Italy) Francesco Bagnaia | Ducati | 1:31.219 | 1:31.507 | 6 | 2 |
| 7 | 88 | (Portugal) Miguel Oliveira | KTM | Qualified in Q2 | 1:31.566 | 7 | 3 |
| 8 | 42 | (Spain) Álex Rins | Suzuki | Qualified in Q2 | 1:31.582 | 8 | 3 |
| 9 | 43 | (Australia) Jack Miller | Ducati | Qualified in Q2 | 1:31.714 | 9 | 3 |
| 10 | 41 | (Spain) Aleix Espargaró | Aprilia | Qualified in Q2 | 1:31.723 | 10 | 4 |
| 11 | 49 | (Italy) Fabio Di Giannantonio | Ducati | 1:31.631 | 1:31.829 | 11 | 4 |
| 12 | 21 | (Italy) Franco Morbidelli | Yamaha | Qualified in Q2 | 1:32.336 | 14^{1} | 5 |
| 13 | 10 | (Italy) Luca Marini | Ducati | 1:31.666 | N/A | 12 | 4 |
| 14 | 72 | (Italy) Marco Bezzecchi | Ducati | 1:31.695 | N/A | 13 | 5 |
| 15 | 93 | (Spain) Marc Márquez | Honda | 1:31.830 | N/A | Did not start^{2} | |
| 16 | 44 | (Spain) Pol Espargaró | Honda | 1:31.831 | N/A | 15 | 5 |
| 17 | 04 | (Italy) Andrea Dovizioso | Yamaha | 1:31.870 | N/A | 16 | 6 |
| 18 | 36 | (Spain) Joan Mir | Suzuki | 1:31.875 | N/A | 17 | 6 |
| 19 | 73 | (Spain) Álex Márquez | Honda | 1:31.987 | N/A | 18 | 6 |
| 20 | 12 | (Spain) Maverick Viñales | Aprilia | 1:32.006 | N/A | 19 | 7 |
| 21 | 25 | (Spain) Raúl Fernández | KTM | 1:32.122 | N/A | 20 | 7 |
| 22 | 87 | (Australia) Remy Gardner | KTM | 1:32.140 | N/A | 21 | 7 |
| 23 | 40 | (South Africa) Darryn Binder | Yamaha | 1:32.299 | N/A | 22 | 8 |
| 24 | 30 | (Japan) Takaaki Nakagami | Honda | 1:32.330 | N/A | 23 | 8 |
OFFICIAL MOTOGP QUALIFYING RESULTS

Notes

- ^1 – Franco Morbidelli was penalized by three positions on the starting grid for not following the starting practice procedure correctly. Following the non-participation of Marc Márquez in the race, he gained a position.
- ^2 - Marc Márquez had qualified in 14th place, but following his fall in the warm up, the doctors decided that he was unfit to participate in the race.

=== Moto2 ===
Fastest session lap

| Pos. | No. | Biker | Constructor | Qualifying times | | Final grid | Row |
| Pos. | No. | Biker | Constructor | Q1 | Q2 | Final grid | Row |
|---|---|---|---|---|---|---|---|
| 1 | 96 | (United Kingdom) Jake Dixon | Kalex | Qualified in Q2 | 1:35.799 | 1 | 1 |
| 2 | 37 | (Spain) Augusto Fernández | Kalex | Qualified in Q2 | 1:35.901 | 2 | 1 |
| 3 | 22 | (United Kingdom) Sam Lowes | Kalex | Qualified in Q2 | 1:35.953 | 3 | 1 |
| 4 | 35 | (Thailand) Somkiat Chantra | Kalex | 1:36.464 | 1:36.260 | 4 | 2 |
| 5 | 64 | (Netherlands) Bo Bendsneyder | Kalex | 1:36.738 | 1:36.337 | 5 | 2 |
| 6 | 75 | (Spain) Albert Arenas | Kalex | Qualified in Q2 | 1:36.581 | 6 | 2 |
| 7 | 13 | (Italy) Celestino Vietti | Kalex | Qualified in Q2 | 1:36.588 | 7 | 3 |
| 8 | 14 | (Italy) Tony Arbolino | Kalex | Qualified in Q2 | 1:36.665 | 8 | 3 |
| 9 | 24 | (Italy) Simone Corsi | MV Agusta | 1:36.882 | 1:36.665 | 9 | 3 |
| 10 | 51 | (Spain) Pedro Acosta | Kalex | Qualified in Q2 | 1:36.751 | 10 | 4 |
| 11 | 6 | (United States) Cameron Beaubier | Kalex | Qualified in Q2 | 1:36.900 | 11 | 4 |
| 12 | 54 | (Spain) Fermín Aldeguer | Boscoscuro | Qualified in Q2 | 1:37.006 | 12 | 4 |
| 13 | 40 | (Spain) Arón Canet | Kalex | Qualified in Q2 | 1:37.028 | 13 | 5 |
| 14 | 42 | (Spain) Marcos Ramírez | MV Agusta | Qualified in Q2 | 1:37.074 | 14 | 5 |
| 15 | 52 | (Spain) Jeremy Alcoba | Kalex | 1:36.870 | 1:37.072 | 15 | 5 |
| 16 | 5 | (Italy) Romano Fenati | Boscoscuro | Qualified in Q2 | 1:37.312 | 16 | 6 |
| 17 | 18 | (Spain) Manuel González | Kalex | Qualified in Q2 | Not classified | 17 | 6 |
| 18 | 9 | (Spain) Jorge Navarro | Kalex | Qualified in Q2 | Not classified | 18 | 6 |
| 19 | 16 | (United States) Joe Roberts | Kalex | 1:36.905 | N/A | 19 | 7 |
| 20 | 7 | (Belgium) Barry Baltus | Kalex | 1:36.908 | N/A | 20 | 7 |
| 21 | 79 | (Japan) Ai Ogura | Kalex | 1:36.913 | N/A | 21 | 7 |
| 22 | 23 | (Germany) Marcel Schrötter | Kalex | 1:37.033 | N/A | 22 | 8 |
| 23 | 12 | (Czech Republic) Filip Salač | Kalex | 1:37.218 | N/A | 23 | 8 |
| 24 | 2 | (Argentina) Gabriel Rodrigo | Kalex | 1:37.436 | N/A | 24 | 8 |
| 25 | 84 | (Netherlands) Zonta van den Goorbergh | Kalex | 1:37.582 | N/A | 25 | 9 |
| 26 | 81 | (Thailand) Keminth Kubo | Kalex | 1:37.625 | N/A | 26 | 9 |
| 27 | 19 | (Italy) Lorenzo Dalla Porta | Kalex | 1:37.843 | N/A | 27 | 9 |
| 28 | 28 | (Italy) Niccolò Antonelli | Kalex | 1:38.066 | N/A | 28 | 10 |
| 29 | 61 | (Italy) Alessandro Zaccone | Kalex | 1:38.069 | N/A | 29 | 10 |
| 30 | 4 | (United States) Sean Dylan Kelly | Kalex | 1:38.225 | N/A | 30 | 10 |
OFFICIAL MOTO2 QUALIFYING RESULTS

=== Moto3 ===
Fastest session lap

| Pos. | No. | Biker | Constructor | Qualifying times | | Final grid | Row |
| Pos. | No. | Biker | Constructor | Q1 | Q2 | Final grid | Row |
|---|---|---|---|---|---|---|---|
| 1 | 99 | (Spain) Carlos Tatay | CFMoto | Qualified in Q2 | 1:41.232 | 1 | 1 |
| 2 | 10 | (Brazil) Diogo Moreira | KTM | Qualified in Q2 | 1:41.315 | 2 | 1 |
| 3 | 64 | (Indonesia) Mario Aji | Honda | 1:42.604 | 1:41.567 | 3 | 1 |
| 4 | 43 | (Spain) Xavier Artigas | CFMoto | 1:42.614 | 1:41.585 | 4 | 2 |
| 5 | 16 | (Italy) Andrea Migno | Honda | Qualified in Q2 | 1:41.594 | 5 | 2 |
| 6 | 7 | (Italy) Dennis Foggia | Honda | Qualified in Q2 | 1:41.674 | 6 | 2 |
| 7 | 11 | (Spain) Sergio García | GasGas | 1:42.302 | 1:41.811 | 7 | 3 |
| 8 | 28 | (Spain) Izan Guevara | GasGas | Qualified in Q2 | 1:41.830 | 8 | 3 |
| 9 | 53 | (Turkey) Deniz Öncü | KTM | Qualified in Q2 | 1:42.203 | 9 | 3 |
| 10 | 71 | (Japan) Ayumu Sasaki | Husqvarna | Qualified in Q2 | 1:42.268 | 10 | 4 |
| 11 | 5 | (Spain) Jaume Masià | Kalex | Qualified in Q2 | 1:42.391 | 11 | 4 |
| 12 | 67 | (Italy) Alberto Surra | Honda | 1:42.637 | 1:42.398 | 12 | 4 |
| 13 | 23 | (Italy) Elia Bartolini | KTM | Qualified in Q2 | 1:42.838 | 13 | 5 |
| 14 | 48 | (Spain) Iván Ortolá | KTM | Qualified in Q2 | 1:42.878 | 14 | 5 |
| 15 | 54 | (Italy) Riccardo Rossi | Honda | Qualified in Q2 | 1:43.129 | 15 | 5 |
| 16 | 18 | (Italy) Matteo Bertelle | KTM | Qualified in Q2 | 1:43.396 | 16 | 6 |
| 17 | 31 | (Spain) Adrián Fernández | KTM | Qualified in Q2 | 1:43.760 | 17 | 6 |
| 18 | 19 | (United Kingdom) Scott Ogden | Honda | Qualified in Q2 | Not classified | 18 | 6 |
| 19 | 96 | (Spain) Daniel Holgado | KTM | 1:42.973 | N/A | 19 | 7 |
| 20 | 24 | (Japan) Tatsuki Suzuki | Honda | 1:43.008 | N/A | 20 | 7 |
| 21 | 82 | (Italy) Stefano Nepa | KTM | 1:43.079 | N/A | 21 | 7 |
| 22 | 66 | (Australia) Joel Kelso | KTM | 1:43.163 | N/A | 22 | 8 |
| 23 | 20 | (France) Lorenzo Fellon | Honda | 1:43'192 | N/A | 23 | 8 |
| 24 | 22 | (Spain) Ana Carrasco | KTM | 1:43.776 | N/A | 24 | 8 |
| 25 | 6 | (Japan) Ryusei Yamanaka | KTM | 1:43.831 | N/A | 25 | 9 |
| 26 | 87 | (Spain) Gerard Riu | KTM | 1:44.390 | N/A | 26 | 9 |
| 27 | 70 | (United Kingdom) Joshua Whatley | Honda | 1:44.478 | N/A | 27 | 9 |
| 28 | 27 | (Japan) Kaito Toba | KTM | 1:44.658 | N/A | 28 | 10 |
OFFICIAL MOTO3 QUALIFYING RESULTS

== Race ==
=== MotoGP ===
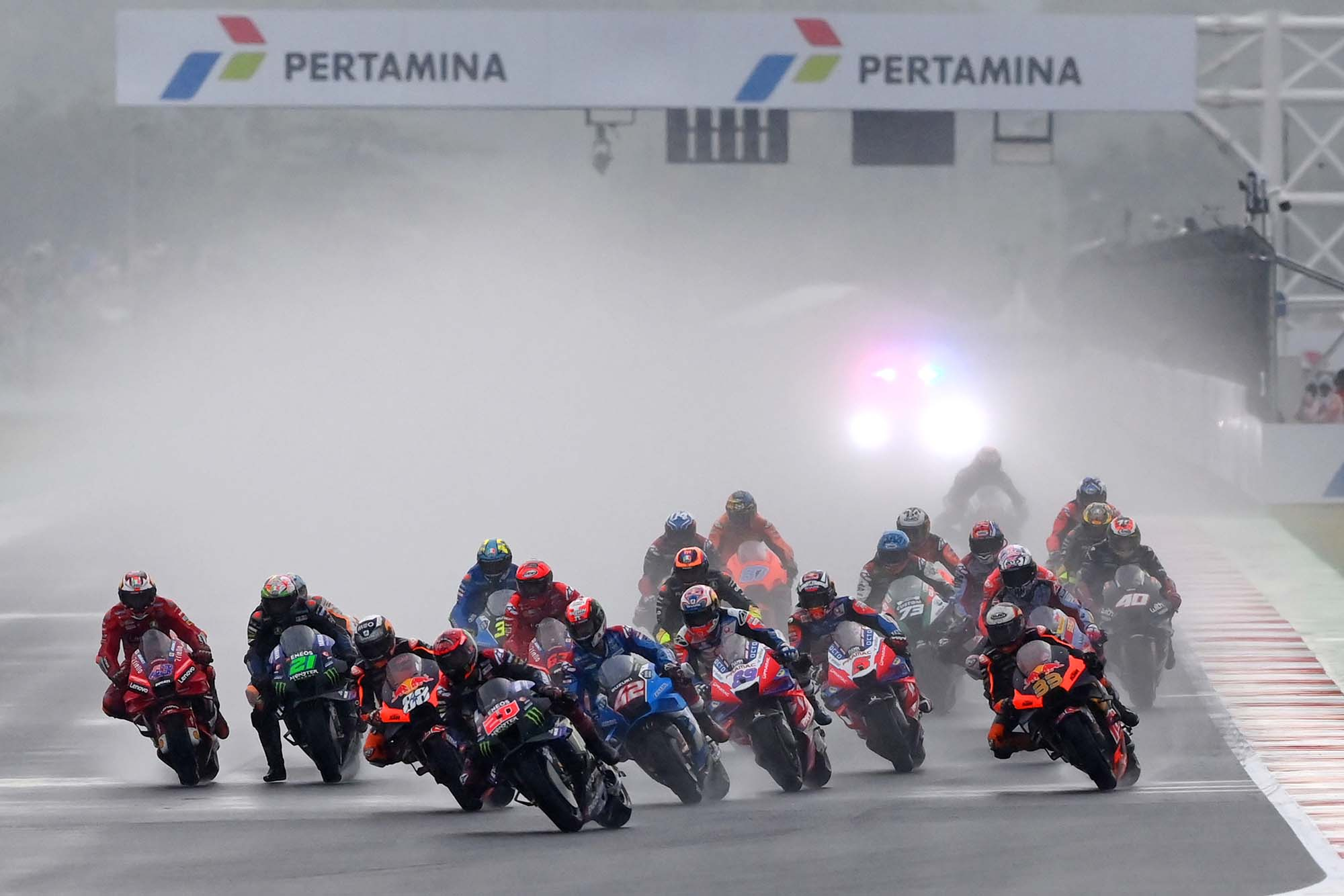
Starting conditions during the race

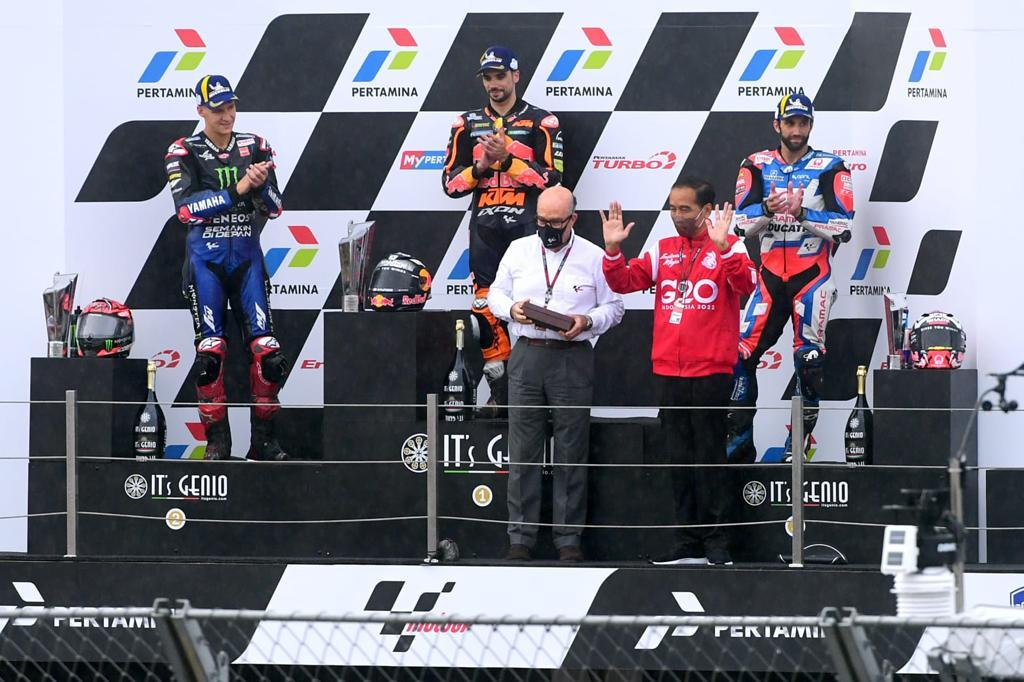
Podium finishers Miguel Oliveira, Fabio Quartararo, and Johann Zarco after the Awarding Ceremony presented by President Joko Widodo

| Pos. | No. | Rider | Team | Manufacturer | Laps | Time/Retired | Grid | Points |
|---|---|---|---|---|---|---|---|---|
| 1 | 88 | (Portugal) Miguel Oliveira | Red Bull KTM Factory Racing | KTM | 20 | 33:27.223 | 7 | 25 |
| 2 | 20 | (France) Fabio Quartararo | Monster Energy Yamaha MotoGP | Yamaha | 20 | +2.205 | 1 | 20 |
| 3 | 5 | (France) Johann Zarco | Pramac Racing | Ducati | 20 | +3.158 | 3 | 16 |
| 4 | 43 | (Australia) Jack Miller | Ducati Lenovo Team | Ducati | 20 | +5.663 | 9 | 13 |
| 5 | 42 | (Spain) Álex Rins | Team Suzuki Ecstar | Suzuki | 20 | +7.044 | 8 | 11 |
| 6 | 36 | (Spain) Joan Mir | Team Suzuki Ecstar | Suzuki | 20 | +7.832 | 17 | 10 |
| 7 | 21 | (Italy) Franco Morbidelli | Monster Energy Yamaha MotoGP | Yamaha | 20 | +21.115 | 14 (Note: 3-place grid penalty.) | 9 |
| 8 | 33 | (South Africa) Brad Binder | Red Bull KTM Factory Racing | KTM | 20 | +32.413 | 4 | 8 |
| 9 | 41 | (Spain) Aleix Espargaró | Aprilia Racing | Aprilia | 20 | +32.586 | 10 | 7 |
| 10 | 40 | (South Africa) Darryn Binder | WithU Yamaha RNF MotoGP Team | Yamaha | 20 | +32.901 | 22 | 6 |
| 11 | 23 | (Italy) Enea Bastianini | Gresini Racing MotoGP | Ducati | 20 | +33.116 | 5 | 5 |
| 12 | 44 | (Spain) Pol Espargaró | Repsol Honda Team | Honda | 20 | +33.599 | 15 | 4 |
| 13 | 73 | (Spain) Álex Márquez | LCR Honda Castrol | Honda | 20 | +33.735 | 18 | 3 |
| 14 | 10 | (Italy) Luca Marini | Mooney VR46 Racing Team | Ducati | 20 | +34.991 | 12 | 2 |
| 15 | 63 | (Italy) Francesco Bagnaia | Ducati Lenovo Team | Ducati | 20 | +35.763 | 6 | 1 |
| 16 | 12 | (Spain) Maverick Viñales | Aprilia Racing | Aprilia | 20 | +37.397 | 19 | |
| 17 | 25 | (Spain) Raúl Fernández | Tech3 KTM Factory Racing | KTM | 20 | +41.975 | 20 | |
| 18 | 49 | (Italy) Fabio Di Giannantonio | Gresini Racing MotoGP | Ducati | 20 | +47.915 | 11 | |
| 19 | 30 | (Japan) Takaaki Nakagami | LCR Honda Idemitsu | Honda | 20 | +49.471 | 23 | |
| 20 | 72 | (Italy) Marco Bezzecchi | Mooney VR46 Racing Team | Ducati | 20 | +49.473 | 13 | |
| 21 | 87 | (Australia) Remy Gardner | Tech3 KTM Factory Racing | KTM | 20 | +55.964 | 21 | |
| Ret | 89 | (Spain) Jorge Martín | Pramac Racing | Ducati | 7 | Accident | 2 | |
| Ret | 4 | (Italy) Andrea Dovizioso | WithU Yamaha RNF MotoGP Team | Yamaha | 6 | Electronics | 16 | |
| DNS | 93 | (Spain) Marc Márquez | Repsol Honda Team | Honda | | Did not start | | |
Sources:

- Marc Márquez suffered a head concussion in a crash during warm up and was declared unfit to compete.

=== Moto2 ===
| Pos. | No. | Rider | Manufacturer | Laps | Time/Retired | Grid | Points |
|---|---|---|---|---|---|---|---|
| 1 | 35 | (Thailand) Somkiat Chantra | Kalex | 16 | 25:40.876 | 4 | 25 |
| 2 | 13 | (Italy) Celestino Vietti | Kalex | 16 | +3.230 | 7 | 20 |
| 3 | 40 | (Spain) Arón Canet | Kalex | 16 | +4.366 | 13 | 16 |
| 4 | 22 | (United Kingdom) Sam Lowes | Kalex | 16 | +7.918 | 3 | 13 |
| 5 | 37 | (Spain) Augusto Fernández | Kalex | 16 | +12.228 | 2 | 11 |
| 6 | 79 | (Japan) Ai Ogura | Kalex | 16 | +12.384 | 20 | 10 |
| 7 | 54 | (Spain) Fermín Aldeguer | Boscoscuro | 16 | +12.696 | 12 | 9 |
| 8 | 14 | (Italy) Tony Arbolino | Kalex | 16 | +14.547 | 8 | 8 |
| 9 | 51 | (Spain) Pedro Acosta | Kalex | 16 | +17.786 | 10 | 7 |
| 10 | 75 | (Spain) Albert Arenas | Kalex | 16 | +18.327 | 6 | 6 |
| 11 | 16 | (United States) Joe Roberts | Kalex | 16 | +18.509 | 19 | 5 |
| 12 | 6 | (United States) Cameron Beaubier | Kalex | 16 | +18.566 | 11 | 4 |
| 13 | 9 | (Spain) Jorge Navarro | Kalex | 16 | +19.711 | 18 | 3 |
| 14 | 52 | (Spain) Jeremy Alcoba | Kalex | 16 | +19.960 | 15 | 2 |
| 15 | 64 | (Netherlands) Bo Bendsneyder | Kalex | 16 | +20.551 | 5 | 1 |
| 16 | 23 | (Germany) Marcel Schrötter | Kalex | 16 | +23.047 | 21 | |
| 17 | 42 | (Spain) Marcos Ramírez | MV Agusta | 16 | +23.218 | 14 | |
| 18 | 18 | (Spain) Manuel González | Kalex | 16 | +24.179 | 17 | |
| 19 | 5 | (Italy) Romano Fenati | Boscoscuro | 16 | +25.133 | 16 | |
| 20 | 19 | (Italy) Lorenzo Dalla Porta | Kalex | 16 | +26.954 | 26 | |
| 21 | 12 | (Czech Republic) Filip Salač | Kalex | 16 | +27.678 | 22 | |
| 22 | 2 | (Argentina) Gabriel Rodrigo | Kalex | 16 | +29.548 | 23 | |
| 23 | 84 | (Netherlands) Zonta van den Goorbergh | Kalex | 16 | +31.773 | 24 | |
| 24 | 61 | (Italy) Alessandro Zaccone | Kalex | 16 | +32.436 | 28 | |
| 25 | 28 | (Italy) Niccolò Antonelli | Kalex | 16 | +33.974 | 27 | |
| Ret | 4 | (United States) Sean Dylan Kelly | Kalex | 13 | Gear Shifter | 29 | |
| Ret | 96 | (United Kingdom) Jake Dixon | Kalex | 12 | Accident Damage | 1 | |
| Ret | 81 | (Thailand) Keminth Kubo | Kalex | 7 | Accident | 25 | |
| Ret | 24 | (Italy) Simone Corsi | MV Agusta | 4 | Accident | 9 | |
| DNS | 7 | (Belgium) Barry Baltus | Kalex | | Did not start | | |
OFFICIAL MOTO2 RACE REPORT

- Barry Baltus suffered a broken wrist in a crash during qualifying and withdrew from the event.

=== Moto3 ===
| Pos. | No. | Rider | Manufacturer | Laps | Time/Retired | Grid | Points |
|---|---|---|---|---|---|---|---|
| 1 | 7 | (Italy) Dennis Foggia | Honda | 23 | 38:51.668 | 6 | 25 |
| 2 | 28 | (Spain) Izan Guevara | Gas Gas | 23 | +2.612 | 8 | 20 |
| 3 | 99 | (Spain) Carlos Tatay | CFMoto | 23 | +3.639 | 1 | 16 |
| 4 | 11 | (Spain) Sergio García | Gas Gas | 23 | +3.759 | 7 | 13 |
| 5 | 53 | (Turkey) Deniz Öncü | KTM | 23 | +3.870 | 9 | 11 |
| 6 | 43 | (Spain) Xavier Artigas | CFMoto | 23 | +4.962 | 4 | 10 |
| 7 | 5 | (Spain) Jaume Masià | KTM | 23 | +5.289 | 11 | 9 |
| 8 | 23 | (Italy) Elia Bartolini | KTM | 23 | +5.405 | 13 | 8 |
| 9 | 96 | (Spain) Daniel Holgado | KTM | 23 | +5.533 | 19 | 7 |
| 10 | 24 | (Japan) Tatsuki Suzuki | Honda | 23 | +5.687 | 20 | 6 |
| 11 | 6 | (Japan) Ryusei Yamanaka | KTM | 23 | +16.286 | 25 | 5 |
| 12 | 27 | (Japan) Kaito Toba | KTM | 23 | +16.921 | 28 | 4 |
| 13 | 19 | (United Kingdom) Scott Ogden | Honda | 23 | +17.257 | 18 | 3 |
| 14 | 64 | (Indonesia) Mario Aji | Honda | 23 | +24.626 | 3 | 2 |
| 15 | 18 | (Italy) Matteo Bertelle | KTM | 23 | +24.809 | 16 | 1 |
| 16 | 20 | (France) Lorenzo Fellon | Honda | 23 | +31.522 | 23 | |
| 17 | 54 | (Italy) Riccardo Rossi | Honda | 23 | +31.628 | 5 | |
| 18 | 66 | (Australia) Joel Kelso | KTM | 23 | +32.204 | 22 | |
| 19 | 22 | (Spain) Ana Carrasco | KTM | 23 | +41.202 | 24 | |
| 20 | 70 | (United Kingdom) Joshua Whatley | Honda | 23 | +48.013 | 27 | |
| 21 | 87 | (Spain) Gerard Riu | KTM | 23 | +48.090 | 26 | |
| Ret | 71 | (Japan) Ayumu Sasaki | Husqvarna | 22 | Collision | 10 | |
| Ret | 16 | (Italy) Andrea Migno | Honda | 22 | Collision | 15 | |
| Ret | 82 | (Italy) Stefano Nepa | KTM | 22 | Accident | 21 | |
| Ret | 67 | (Italy) Alberto Surra | Honda | 17 | Accident Damage | 12 | |
| Ret | 31 | (Spain) Adrián Fernández | KTM | 10 | Engine | 17 | |
| Ret | 10 | (Brazil) Diogo Moreira | KTM | 8 | Mechanical | 2 | |
| Ret | 48 | (Spain) Iván Ortolá | KTM | 7 | Accident Damage | 14 | |
OFFICIAL MOTO3 RACE REPORT

== Championship standings after the race ==
Below are the standings for the top five riders, constructors, and teams after the round.

=== MotoGP ===
Riders' Championship standings

| | Pos. | Rider | Points |
|---|---|---|---|
| | 1 | (Italy) Enea Bastianini | 30 |
| | 2 | (South Africa) Brad Binder | 28 |
| 6 | 3 | (France) Fabio Quartararo | 27 |
| 17 | 4 | (Portugal) Miguel Oliveira | 25 |
| 3 | 5 | (France) Johann Zarco | 24 |

Constructors' Championship standings

| | Pos. | Constructor | Points |
|---|---|---|---|
| 1 | 1 | (Austria) KTM | 45 |
| 1 | 2 | (Italy) Ducati | 41 |
| 3 | 3 | (Japan) Yamaha | 27 |
| 1 | 4 | (Japan) Suzuki | 21 |
| 2 | 5 | (Japan) Honda | 20 |

Teams' Championship standings

| | Pos. | Team | Points |
|---|---|---|---|
| 2 | 1 | (Austria) Red Bull KTM Factory Racing | 53 |
| 4 | 2 | (Japan) Monster Energy Yamaha MotoGP | 41 |
| 1 | 3 | (Japan) Team Suzuki Ecstar | 40 |
| 3 | 4 | (Japan) Repsol Honda Team | 31 |
| 3 | 5 | (Italy) Gresini Racing MotoGP | 30 |

=== Moto2 ===
Riders' Championship standings

| | Pos. | Rider | Points |
|---|---|---|---|
| | 1 | (Italy) Celestino Vietti | 45 |
| | 2 | (Spain) Arón Canet | 36 |
| | 3 | (United Kingdom) Sam Lowes | 29 |
| 26 | 4 | (Thailand) Somkiat Chantra | 25 |
| 1 | 5 | (Spain) Augusto Fernández | 24 |

Constructors' Championship standings

| Pos. | Constructor | Points |
|---|---|---|
| 1 | (Germany) Kalex | 50 |
| 2 | (Italy) Boscoscuro | 10 |

Teams' Championship standings

| | Pos. | Team | Points |
|---|---|---|---|
| | 1 | (Spain) Flexbox HP40 | 48 |
| | 2 | (Belgium) Elf Marc VDS Racing Team | 48 |
| 2 | 3 | (Japan) Idemitsu Honda Team Asia | 45 |
| 1 | 4 | (Italy) Mooney VR46 Racing Team | 45 |
| 1 | 5 | (Finland) Red Bull KTM Ajo | 35 |

=== Moto3 ===
Riders' Championship standings

| | Pos. | Rider | Points |
|---|---|---|---|
| 6 | 1 | (Italy) Dennis Foggia | 34 |
| | 2 | (Spain) Sergio García | 33 |
| 5 | 3 | (Spain) Izan Guevara | 28 |
| 3 | 4 | (Italy) Andrea Migno | 25 |
| 1 | 5 | (Turkey) Deniz Öncü | 24 |

Constructors' Championship standings

| | Pos. | Constructor | Points |
|---|---|---|---|
| | 1 | (Japan) Honda | 50 |
| | 2 | (Spain) Gas Gas | 40 |
| | 3 | (Austria) KTM | 27 |
| 1 | 4 | (China) CFMoto | 22 |
| 1 | 5 | (Sweden) Husqvarna | 11 |

Teams' Championship standings

| | Pos. | Team | Points |
|---|---|---|---|
| | 1 | (Spain) Gaviota GasGas Aspar Team | 61 |
| 5 | 2 | (Luxembourg) Leopard Racing | 40 |
| 6 | 3 | (Germany) CFMoto Racing Prüstel GP | 32 |
| 1 | 4 | (France) Red Bull KTM Tech3 | 26 |
| 3 | 5 | (Italy) Rivacold Snipers Team | 25 |

== Notes ==
| Previous race: 2022 Qatar Grand Prix | FIM Grand Prix World Championship; 2022 season | Next race: 2022 Argentine Grand Prix |
| Previous race: 1997 Indonesian Grand Prix | Indonesian motorcycle Grand Prix | Next race: 2023 Indonesian Grand Prix |
