= 2025 Indonesian motorcycle Grand Prix =

Motorcycle races in Central Lombok Regency

(Indonesia) 2025 Indonesian Grand Prix
Race details
- Race 18 of 22 races in the 2025 Grand Prix motorcycle racing season
- Date: 5 October 2025
- Official name: Pertamina Grand Prix of Indonesia
- Location: Pertamina Mandalika International Circuit; Mandalika, Indonesia
- Course: Street circuit; 4.301 km (2.673 mi)

MotoGP
Pole position
Rider	(Italy) Marco Bezzecchi	Aprilia
Time	1:28.832	
Fastest lap
Rider	(Spain) Fermín Aldeguer	Ducati
Time	1:30.499 on lap 9	
Podium
First	(Spain) Fermín Aldeguer	Ducati
Second	(Spain) Pedro Acosta	KTM
Third	(Spain) Álex Márquez	Ducati

Moto2
Pole position
Rider	(Brazil) Diogo Moreira	Kalex
Time	1:32.341	
Fastest lap
Rider	(Spain) Daniel Holgado	Kalex
Time	1:33.104 on lap 3	
Podium
First	(Brazil) Diogo Moreira	Kalex
Second	(Spain) Izan Guevara	Boscoscuro
Third	(Spain) Arón Canet	Kalex

Moto3
Pole position
Rider	(Spain) Adrián Fernández	Honda
Time	1:37.022	
Fastest lap
Rider	(Spain) José Antonio Rueda	KTM
Time	1:37.255 on lap 7	
Podium
First	(Spain) José Antonio Rueda	KTM
Second	(Italy) Luca Lunetta	Honda
Third	(Italy) Guido Pini	KTM

The 2025 Indonesian motorcycle Grand Prix (officially known as the Pertamina Grand Prix of Indonesia) was the eighteenth round of the 2025 Grand Prix motorcycle racing season. All races were held at the Pertamina Mandalika International Circuit in Mandalika on 5 October 2025.

In the MotoGP class, Fermín Aldeguer won the race, becoming the second-youngest MotoGP winner in history. Álex Márquez won the best independent rider award this season, and Ducati Lenovo Team secured their second consecutive Teams' Championship.

In the Moto3 class, José Antonio Rueda won his ninth Grand Prix of the season, securing enough points to clinch the Riders' Championship.

== MotoGP Sprint ==
The MotoGP Sprint was held on 4 October 2025.

Pos.	No.	Rider	Team	Manufacturer	Laps	Time/Retired	Grid	Points
1	72	(Italy) Marco Bezzecchi	Aprilia Racing	Aprilia	13	19:37.047	1	12
2	54	(Spain) Fermín Aldeguer	BK8 Gresini Racing MotoGP	Ducati	13	+0.157	2	9
3	25	(Spain) Raúl Fernández	Trackhouse MotoGP Team	Aprilia	13	+4.062	3	7
4	73	(Spain) Álex Márquez	BK8 Gresini Racing MotoGP	Ducati	13	+5.832	7	6
5	36	(Spain) Joan Mir	Honda HRC Castrol	Honda	13	+8.759	12	5
6	93	(Spain) Marc Márquez	Ducati Lenovo Team	Ducati	13	+9.772	9	4
7	21	(Italy) Franco Morbidelli	Pertamina Enduro VR46 Racing Team	Ducati	13	+11.980	13	3
8	49	(Italy) Fabio Di Giannantonio	Pertamina Enduro VR46 Racing Team	Ducati	13	+12.096	11	2
9	88	(Portugal) Miguel Oliveira	Prima Pramac Yamaha MotoGP	Yamaha	13	+12.988	10	1
10	33	(South Africa) Brad Binder	Red Bull KTM Factory Racing	KTM	13	+13.312	15	
11	43	(Australia) Jack Miller	Prima Pramac Yamaha MotoGP	Yamaha	13	+15.905	14	
12	42	(Spain) Álex Rins	Monster Energy Yamaha MotoGP Team	Yamaha	13	+16.226	4	
13	10	(Italy) Luca Marini	Honda HRC Castrol	Honda	13	+17.621 (Note: 8-second penalty for illegal tyre pressures.)	6	
14	63	(Italy) Francesco Bagnaia	Ducati Lenovo Team	Ducati	13	+29.393	16	
Ret	20	(France) Fabio Quartararo	Monster Energy Yamaha MotoGP Team	Yamaha	12	Accident	8	
Ret	5	(France) Johann Zarco	LCR Honda Castrol	Honda	9	Accident	18	
Ret	37	(Spain) Pedro Acosta	Red Bull KTM Factory Racing	KTM	5	Accident	5	
Ret	23	(Italy) Enea Bastianini	Red Bull KTM Tech3	KTM	1	Accident	17	
Ret	35	(Thailand) Somkiat Chantra	IDEMITSU Honda LCR	Honda	0	Crashed out	19	
DNS	12	(Spain) Maverick Viñales	Red Bull KTM Tech3	KTM		Injury^{1}	—	
Fastest sprint lap: (Italy) Marco Bezzecchi (Aprilia) – 1:29.638 (lap 9)
OFFICIAL MOTOGP SPRINT REPORT

Notes

- ^1 - Maverick Viñales withdrew from the Sprint and the rest of the weekend in order to recover from his left shoulder injury. None of the riders' grid position were affected as he qualified last.

== Race ==
=== MotoGP ===
Pos.	No.	Rider	Team	Manufacturer	Laps	Time/Retired	Grid	Points
1	54	(Spain) Fermín Aldeguer	BK8 Gresini Racing MotoGP	Ducati	27	41:07.651	2	25
2	37	(Spain) Pedro Acosta	Red Bull KTM Factory Racing	KTM	27	+6.987	5	20
3	73	(Spain) Álex Márquez	BK8 Gresini Racing MotoGP	Ducati	27	+7.896	7	16
4	33	(South Africa) Brad Binder	Red Bull KTM Factory Racing	KTM	27	+8.901	15	13
5	10	(Italy) Luca Marini	Honda HRC Castrol	Honda	27	+9.129	6	11
6	25	(Spain) Raúl Fernández	Trackhouse MotoGP Team	Aprilia	27	+9.709	3	10
7	20	(France) Fabio Quartararo	Monster Energy Yamaha MotoGP Team	Yamaha	27	+9.894	8	9
8	21	(Italy) Franco Morbidelli	Pertamina Enduro VR46 Racing Team	Ducati	27	+10.087	13	8
9	49	(Italy) Fabio Di Giannantonio	Pertamina Enduro VR46 Racing Team	Ducati	27	+10.350	11	7
10	42	(Spain) Álex Rins	Monster Energy Yamaha MotoGP Team	Yamaha	27	+13.223	4	6
11	88	(Portugal) Miguel Oliveira	Prima Pramac Yamaha MotoGP	Yamaha	27	+19.769	10	5
12	5	(France) Johann Zarco	LCR Honda Castrol	Honda	27	+27.597	18	4
13	35	(Thailand) Somkiat Chantra	IDEMITSU Honda LCR	Honda	27	+48.035	19	3
14	43	(Australia) Jack Miller	Prima Pramac Yamaha MotoGP	Yamaha	27	+55.540	14	2
Ret	23	(Italy) Enea Bastianini	Red Bull KTM Tech3	KTM	12	Retired in pits	17	
Ret	63	(Italy) Francesco Bagnaia	Ducati Lenovo Team	Ducati	7	Accident	16	
Ret	36	(Spain) Joan Mir	Honda HRC Castrol	Honda	2	Retired in pits	12	
Ret	72	(Italy) Marco Bezzecchi	Aprilia Racing	Aprilia	0	Collision	1	
Ret	93	(Spain) Marc Márquez	Ducati Lenovo Team	Ducati	0	Collision	9	
Fastest lap: (Spain) Fermín Aldeguer (Ducati) – 1:30.499 (lap 9)
OFFICIAL MOTOGP RACE REPORT

== Championship standings after the race ==
Below are the standings for the top five riders, constructors, and teams after the round.

=== MotoGP ===
Riders' Championship standings

	Pos.	Rider	Points
	1	(Spain) Marc Márquez	545
	2	(Spain) Álex Márquez	362
	3	(Italy) Francesco Bagnaia	274
	4	(Italy) Marco Bezzecchi	254
1	5	(Spain) Pedro Acosta	215

Constructors' Championship standings

Pos.	Constructor	Points
1	(Italy) Ducati	646
2	(Italy) Aprilia	308
3	(Austria) KTM	280
4	(Japan) Honda	236
5	(Japan) Yamaha	190

Teams' Championship standings

Pos.	Team	Points
1	(Italy) Ducati Lenovo Team	819
2	(Italy) BK8 Gresini Racing MotoGP	543
3	(Italy) Pertamina Enduro VR46 Racing Team	398
4	(Austria) Red Bull KTM Factory Racing	333
5	(Italy) Aprilia Racing	296

=== Moto2 ===
Riders' Championship standings

Pos.	Rider	Points
1	(Spain) Manuel González	238
2	(Brazil) Diogo Moreira	229
3	(Spain) Arón Canet	205
4	(Belgium) Barry Baltus	195
5	(United Kingdom) Jake Dixon	179

Constructors' Championship standings

Pos.	Constructor	Points
1	(Germany) Kalex	428
2	(Italy) Boscoscuro	275
3	(Switzerland) Forward	13

Teams' Championship standings

	Pos.	Team	Points
	1	(Italy) Fantic Racing	400
	2	(Germany) Liqui Moly Dynavolt Intact GP	346
	3	(Belgium) Elf Marc VDS Racing Team	261
1	4	(Italy) Italtrans Racing Team	251
1	5	(Spain) CFMoto Power Electronics Aspar Team	250

=== Moto3 ===
Riders' Championship standings

	Pos.	Rider	Points
	1	(Spain) José Antonio Rueda	340
	2	(Spain) Ángel Piqueras	231
	3	(Spain) Máximo Quiles	217
	4	(Spain) David Muñoz	197
1	5	(Australia) Joel Kelso	159

Constructors' Championship standings

Pos.	Constructor	Points
1	(Austria) KTM	450
2	(Japan) Honda	232

Teams' Championship standings

Pos.	Team	Points
1	(Finland) Red Bull KTM Ajo	497
2	(Spain) Frinsa – MT Helmets – MSi	354
3	(Spain) CFMoto Gaviota Aspar Team	311
4	(Germany) Liqui Moly Dynavolt Intact GP	290
5	(Luxembourg) Leopard Racing	240

== Notes ==
Previous race: 2025 Japanese Grand Prix	FIM Grand Prix World Championship; 2025 season	Next race: 2025 Australian Grand Prix
Previous race: 2024 Indonesian Grand Prix	Indonesian motorcycle Grand Prix	Next race: 2026 Indonesian Grand Prix
