= Keminth Kubo =

Thai motorcycle racer

- Nationality: Thai
- Born: 21 May 1999 (age 27); Bangkok, Thailand
- Bike number: 81
Motorcycle racing career statistics
Moto2 World Championship
Active years	2021–2022
Manufacturers	Kalex
2022 championship position	25th (7.5 pts)
Starts / Wins / Podiums / Poles / F. laps / Points; 17 / 0 / 0 / 0 / 0 / 7.5

Keminth Kubo (Thai: เขมินท์ คูโบะ, born 21 May 1999) is a Thai motorcycle racer. He previously competed in the FIM CEV Moto2 European Championship from 2019 to 2021 with the same team.

== Career statistics ==
=== FIM Moto2 European Championship ===
==== Races by year ====
(key) (Races in bold indicate pole position, races in italics indicate fastest lap)

Year	Bike	1	2	3	4	5	6	7	8	9	10	11	12	Pos	Pts
2019	Kalex	EST1; Ret	EST2; 19	VAL; 13	CAT1; 17	CAT2; 13	ARA1; 10	ARA2; 9	JER; 5	ALB1; 7	ALB2; 6	VAL; 9		9th	56
2020	Kalex	EST1	EST2	POR1	POR2	JER1; Ret	JER2; 5	ARA1; 4	ARA2; 5	ARA3; 4	VAL1; 6	VAL2; 13		9th	61
2021	Kalex	EST1; 4	EST2; 6	VAL; Ret	CAT1; Ret	CAT2; DNS	POR1; Ret	POR2; 18	ARA1; 7	ARA2; C	JER1; 5	JER2; 7	VAL; 8	11th	60

=== Grand Prix motorcycle racing ===
==== By season ====
Season	Class	Motorcycle	Team	Race	Win	Podium	Pole	FLap	Pts	Plcd
2021	Moto2	Kalex	VR46 Master Camp Team	1	0	0	0	0	0	42nd
2022	Moto2	Kalex	Yamaha VR46 Master Camp Team	16	0	0	0	0	7.5	25th
Total				**17**	**0**	**0**	**0**	**0**	**7.5**	

==== By class ====
Class	Seasons	1st GP	1st Pod	1st Win	Race	Win	Podiums	Pole	FLap	Pts	WChmp
Moto2	2021–2022	2021 Catalunya			17	0	0	0	0	7.5	0
Total	2021–present				**17**	**0**	**0**	**0**	**0**	**7.5**	**0**

==== Races by year ====
(key) (Races in bold indicate pole position; races in italics indicate fastest lap)

Year	Class	Bike	1	2	3	4	5	6	7	8	9	10	11	12	13	14	15	16	17	18	19	20	Pos	Pts
2021	Moto2	Kalex	QAT	DOH	POR	SPA	FRA	ITA	CAT; 26	GER	NED	STY	AUT	GBR	ARA	RSM	AME	EMI	ALR	VAL			42nd	0
2022	Moto2	Kalex	QAT; 23	INA; Ret	ARG; 19	AME	POR; 12	SPA; WD	FRA	ITA; 22	CAT	GER; Ret	NED; 21	GBR; 23	AUT; Ret	RSM; Ret	ARA; Ret	JPN; 18	THA; 9^{‡}	AUS; Ret	MAL; 16	VAL; 17	25th	7.5

^{‡} Half points awarded as less than two thirds of the race distance (but at least three full laps) was completed.

=== ARRC Supersports 1000 Championship ===
==== Races by year ====
(key) (Races in bold indicate pole position; races in italics indicate fastest lap)

Year	Bike	1		2		3		4		5		6		Pos	Pts
Year	Bike	R1	R2	R1	R2	R1	R2	R1	R2	R1	R2	R1	R2	Pos	Pts
2023	Yamaha	CHA; 9	CHA; 8	SEP; 9	SEP; 8	SUG	SUG	MAN	MAN	ZHU	ZHU	CHA	CHA	11th	30
