= 2026 Indonesian motorcycle Grand Prix =

Motorcycle races in Central Lombok Regency

(Indonesia) 2026 Indonesian Grand Prix
Race details
- Race 17 of 22 races in the 2026 Grand Prix motorcycle racing season
- Date: 11 October 2026
- Official name: Pertamina Grand Prix of Indonesia
- Location: Pertamina Mandalika International Circuit; Mandalika, Indonesia
- Course: Street circuit; 4.301 km (2.673 mi)

MotoGP
Pole position
Rider	(Spain) Raúl Fernández	Aprilia
Time	1:28.852	
Fastest lap
Rider	(Italy) Marco Bezzecchi	Aprilia
Time	1:29.960 on lap 19	
Podium
First	(Italy) Marco Bezzecchi	Aprilia
Second	(Spain) Raúl Fernández	Aprilia
Third	(Spain) Jorge Martín	Aprilia

Moto2
Pole position
Rider	(Spain) Izan Guevara	Boscoscuro
Time	1:31.963	
Fastest lap
Rider	(Spain) Álex Escrig	Forward
Time	1:32.497 on lap 3	
Podium
First	(Spain) Izan Guevara	Boscoscuro
Second	(Spain) Manuel González	Kalex
Third	(Spain) Daniel Holgado	Kalex

Moto3
Pole position
Rider	(Spain) Brian Uriarte	KTM
Time	1:36.861	
Fastest lap
Rider	(Italy) Matteo Bertelle	KTM
Time	1:37.189 on lap 18	
Podium
First	(Spain) Máximo Quiles	KTM
Second	(Spain) David Almansa	KTM
Third	(Spain) Brian Uriarte	KTM

The 2026 Indonesian motorcycle Grand Prix (officially known as the Pertamina Grand Prix of Indonesia) was the seventeenth round of the 2026 Grand Prix motorcycle racing season. All races were held at the Pertamina Mandalika International Circuit in Mandalika on 11 October 2026.

In the Moto3 class, Máximo Quiles won his tenth Grand Prix of the season, securing enough points to clinch the Riders' Championship.

== MotoGP Sprint ==
The MotoGP Sprint was held on 10 October 2026.

Pos.	No.	Rider	Team	Manufacturer	Laps	Time/Retired	Grid	Points
1	93	(Spain) Marc Márquez	Ducati Lenovo Team	Ducati	13	19:37.125	4	12
2	79	(Japan) Ai Ogura	SuperFile Trackhouse MotoGP Team	Aprilia	13	+0.509	7	9
3	49	(Italy) Fabio Di Giannantonio	Pertamina Enduro VR46 Racing Team	Ducati	13	+0.835	3	7
4	89	(Spain) Jorge Martín	Aprilia Racing	Aprilia	13	+1.947	5	6
5	73	(Spain) Álex Márquez	BK8 Gresini Racing MotoGP	Ducati	13	+3.410	8	5
6	37	(Spain) Pedro Acosta	Red Bull KTM Factory Racing	KTM	13	+5.478	9	4
7	54	(Spain) Fermín Aldeguer	BK8 Gresini Racing MotoGP	Ducati	13	+7.036	6	3
8	63	(Italy) Francesco Bagnaia	Ducati Lenovo Team	Ducati	13	+10.039	10	2
9	20	(France) Fabio Quartararo	Monster Energy Yamaha MotoGP Team	Yamaha	13	+10.248	12	1
10	42	(Spain) Álex Rins	Monster Energy Yamaha MotoGP Team	Yamaha	13	+13.288	13	
11	23	(Italy) Enea Bastianini	Red Bull KTM Tech3	KTM	13	+16.834	14	
12	5	(France) Johann Zarco	Castrol Honda LCR	Honda	13	+17.646	20	
13	43	(Australia) Jack Miller	Prima Pramac Yamaha MotoGP	Yamaha	13	+18.285	17	
14	21	(Italy) Franco Morbidelli	Pertamina Enduro VR46 Racing Team	Ducati	13	+18.956	11	
15	10	(Italy) Luca Marini	Honda HRC Castrol	Honda	13	+19.227	15	
16	33	(South Africa) Brad Binder	Red Bull KTM Factory Racing	KTM	13	+19.293	16	
17	11	(Brazil) Diogo Moreira	Pro Honda LCR	Honda	13	+19.562	21	
18	12	(Spain) Maverick Viñales	Red Bull KTM Tech3	KTM	13	+23.472	18	
19	7	(Turkey) Toprak Razgatlıoğlu	Prima Pramac Yamaha MotoGP	Yamaha	13	+23.834	19	
20	41	(Spain) Aleix Espargaró	Honda HRC Castrol	Honda	13	+38.336	22	
Ret	72	(Italy) Marco Bezzecchi	Aprilia Racing	Aprilia	0	Collision	2	
Ret	25	(Spain) Raúl Fernández	SuperFile Trackhouse MotoGP Team	Aprilia	0	Collision	1	
Fastest sprint lap: (Spain) Jorge Martín (Aprilia) - 1:29.752 (lap 4)
Official MotoGP Sprint Report

== Race ==
=== MotoGP ===
Pos.	No.	Rider	Team	Manufacturer	Laps	Time/Retired	Grid	Points
1	72	(Italy) Marco Bezzecchi	Aprilia Racing	Aprilia	27	40:46.582	2	25
2	25	(Spain) Raúl Fernández	SuperFile Trackhouse MotoGP Team	Aprilia	27	+4.260	1	20
3	89	(Spain) Jorge Martín	Aprilia Racing	Aprilia	27	+6.890	5	16
4	79	(Japan) Ai Ogura	SuperFile Trackhouse MotoGP Team	Aprilia	27	+9.378	7	13
5	37	(Spain) Pedro Acosta	Red Bull KTM Factory Racing	KTM	27	+9.492	9	11
6	93	(Spain) Marc Márquez	Ducati Lenovo Team	Ducati	27	+10.778	4	10
7	73	(Spain) Álex Márquez	BK8 Gresini Racing MotoGP	Ducati	27	+16.821	8	9
8	49	(Italy) Fabio Di Giannantonio	Pertamina Enduro VR46 Racing Team	Ducati	27	+19.840	3	8
9	20	(France) Fabio Quartararo	Monster Energy Yamaha MotoGP Team	Yamaha	27	+19.999	12	7
10	23	(Italy) Enea Bastianini	Red Bull KTM Tech3	KTM	27	+21.111	14	6
11	33	(South Africa) Brad Binder	Red Bull KTM Factory Racing	KTM	27	+21.912	16	5
12	10	(Italy) Luca Marini	Honda HRC Castrol	Honda	27	+22.656	15	4
13	5	(France) Johann Zarco	Castrol Honda LCR	Honda	27	+26.260	19	3
14	21	(Italy) Franco Morbidelli	Pertamina Enduro VR46 Racing Team	Ducati	27	+28.012	11	2
15	42	(Spain) Álex Rins	Monster Energy Yamaha MotoGP Team	Yamaha	27	+31.662	13	1
16	11	(Brazil) Diogo Moreira	Pro Honda LCR	Honda	27	+34.168	20	
17	12	(Spain) Maverick Viñales	Red Bull KTM Tech3	KTM	27	+1:11.596 (Note: 16-second penalty due to low tyre pressure.)	18	
Ret	7	(Turkey) Toprak Razgatlıoğlu	Prima Pramac Yamaha MotoGP	Yamaha	8	Physical	21	
Ret	63	(Italy) Francesco Bagnaia	Ducati Lenovo Team	Ducati	5	Accident	21	
Ret	43	(Australia) Jack Miller	Prima Pramac Yamaha MotoGP	Yamaha	5	Accident	17	
Ret	54	(Spain) Fermín Aldeguer	BK8 Gresini Racing MotoGP	Ducati	1	Accident	6	
DNS	41	(Spain) Aleix Espargaró	Honda HRC Castrol	Honda		Injury		
Fastest lap: (Italy) Marco Bezzecchi (Aprilia) – 1:29.960 (lap 19)
Official MotoGP Race Report

== Championship standings after the race ==
Below are the standings for the top five riders, constructors, and teams after the round.

=== MotoGP ===
Riders' Championship standings

	Pos.	Rider	Points
	1	(Spain) Jorge Martín	355
	2	(Spain) Marc Márquez	353
	3	(Italy) Marco Bezzecchi	309
1	4	(Japan) Ai Ogura	259
1	5	(Spain) Pedro Acosta	258

Constructors' Championship standings

	Pos.	Constructor	Points
1	1	(Italy) Aprilia	503
1	2	(Italy) Ducati	491
	3	(Austria) KTM	311
	4	(Japan) Honda	165
	5	(Japan) Yamaha	97

Teams' Championship standings

Pos.	Team	Points
1	(Italy) Aprilia Racing	664
2	(Italy) Ducati Lenovo Team	519
3	(United States) SuperFile Trackhouse MotoGP Team	495
4	(Austria) Red Bull KTM Factory Racing	362
5	(Italy) BK8 Gresini Racing MotoGP	306

=== Moto2 ===
Riders' Championship standings

	Pos.	Rider	Points
	1	(Spain) Manuel González	265.5
	2	(Spain) Izan Guevara	260
	3	(Spain) Iván Ortolá	191.5
1	4	(Spain) Daniel Holgado	170
1	5	(Colombia) David Alonso	166

Constructors' Championship standings

Pos.	Constructor	Points
1	(Germany) Kalex	392.5
2	(Italy) Boscoscuro	281
3	(Switzerland) Forward	63

Teams' Championship standings

Pos.	Team	Points
1	(Germany) Liqui Moly Dynavolt Intact GP	430.5
2	(Spain) CFMoto Power Electronics Aspar Team	336
3	(Italy) Blu Cru Pramac Yamaha Moto2	277.5
4	(United States) OnlyFans American Racing Team	197
5	(Spain) QJMotor – JP Financial – MSi	195.5

=== Moto3 ===
Riders' Championship standings

	Pos.	Rider	Points
	1	(Spain) Máximo Quiles	351
	2	(Spain) David Almansa	217
1	3	(Spain) Brian Uriarte	198
1	4	(Spain) Álvaro Carpe	189
12	5	(Spain) Adrián Fernández	148

Constructors' Championship standings

Pos.	Constructor	Points
1	(Austria) KTM	420
2	(Japan) Honda	213

Teams' Championship standings

	Pos.	Team	Points
	1	(Spain) CFMoto Gaviota Aspar Team	491
	2	(Finland) Red Bull KTM Ajo	387
	3	(Germany) Liqui Moly Dynavolt Intact GP	285
3	4	(Luxembourg) Leopard Racing	225
1	5	(France) Red Bull KTM Tech3	209

== Notes ==
Previous race: 2026 Japanese Grand Prix	FIM Grand Prix World Championship; 2026 season	Next race: 2026 Australian Grand Prix
Previous race: 2025 Indonesian Grand Prix	Indonesian motorcycle Grand Prix	Next race: 2027 Indonesian Grand Prix
