= Indonesian motorcycle Grand Prix =

World championship motorcycle road race

Coordinates: 6°32′09″S 106°51′24″E

Indonesian Grand Prix

Grand Prix motorcycle racing
- Venue: Pertamina Mandalika International Street Circuit (2022–present); Sentul International Circuit (1996–1997)
- First race: 1996
- Most wins (rider): Diogo Moreira (2)
- Most wins (manufacturer): Honda, Kalex, KTM (4)

Sentul International Circuit, used in 1996 and 1997.

The Indonesian motorcycle Grand Prix is a motorcycling event that is part of the FIM Grand Prix motorcycle racing season.

Sentul International Circuit hosted the race in 1996 and 1997. As a response to the 1997 Asian financial crisis, this race was dropped from the 1998 calendar.

In February 2019, it was announced that the Indonesian GP would return in 2021 to be held at the Pertamina Mandalika International Street Circuit, then under construction in the Mandalika resort area of Central Lombok Regency, West Nusa Tenggara.

The track, claimed to be a street circuit, is the first in Grand Prix motorcycle racing since the Brno Circuit last staged a Grand Prix as a street circuit in 1986.

The Grand Prix races were subsequently postponed until 2022 due to the COVID-19 pandemic.

== Official names and sponsors ==
- 1996–1997: Marlboro Indonesian Grand Prix
- 2022–present: Pertamina Grand Prix of Indonesia

== Winners ==
=== Multiple winners (riders) ===
# Wins	Rider	Wins	
# Wins	Rider	Category	Years won
2	(Brazil) Diogo Moreira		
2	(Brazil) Diogo Moreira	Moto2	2025
2	(Brazil) Diogo Moreira	Moto3	2023

=== Multiple winners (manufacturers) ===
# Wins	Manufacturer	Wins	
# Wins	Manufacturer	Category	Years won
4	(Japan) Honda	500cc	1996, 1997
4	(Japan) Honda	250cc	1997
4	(Japan) Honda	Moto3	2022
4	(Germany) Kalex	Moto2	2022, 2023, 2024, 2025
4	(Austria) KTM	MotoGP	2022
4	(Austria) KTM	Moto3	2023, 2025, 2026
3	(Italy) Ducati	MotoGP	2023, 2024, 2025
3	(Italy) Aprilia	MotoGP	2026
3	(Italy) Aprilia	125cc	1996, 1997

=== By year ===
Year	Track	Moto3		Moto2		MotoGP		Report
Year	Track	Rider	Manufacturer	Rider	Manufacturer	Rider	Manufacturer	Report
2026	Mandalika	(Spain) Máximo Quiles	KTM	(Spain) Izan Guevara	Boscoscuro	(Italy) Marco Bezzecchi	Aprilia	Report
2025	Mandalika	(Spain) José Antonio Rueda	KTM	(Brazil) Diogo Moreira	Kalex	(Spain) Fermín Aldeguer	Ducati	Report
2024	Mandalika	(Colombia) David Alonso	CFMoto	(Spain) Arón Canet	Kalex	(Spain) Jorge Martín	Ducati	Report
2023	Mandalika	(Brazil) Diogo Moreira	KTM	(Spain) Pedro Acosta	Kalex	(Italy) Francesco Bagnaia	Ducati	Report
2022	Mandalika	(Italy) Dennis Foggia	Honda	(Thailand) Somkiat Chantra	Kalex	(Portugal) Miguel Oliveira	KTM	Report
Year	Track	125cc		250cc		500cc		Report
Year	Track	Rider	Manufacturer	Rider	Manufacturer	Rider	Manufacturer	Report
1997	Sentul	(Italy) Valentino Rossi	Aprilia	(Italy) Max Biaggi	Honda	(Japan) Tadayuki Okada	Honda	Report
1996	Sentul	(Japan) Masaki Tokudome	Aprilia	(Japan) Tetsuya Harada	Yamaha	(Australia) Mick Doohan	Honda	Report

== See also ==
- Indonesian Grand Prix
