= Mandalika (resort area) =

- Resort area
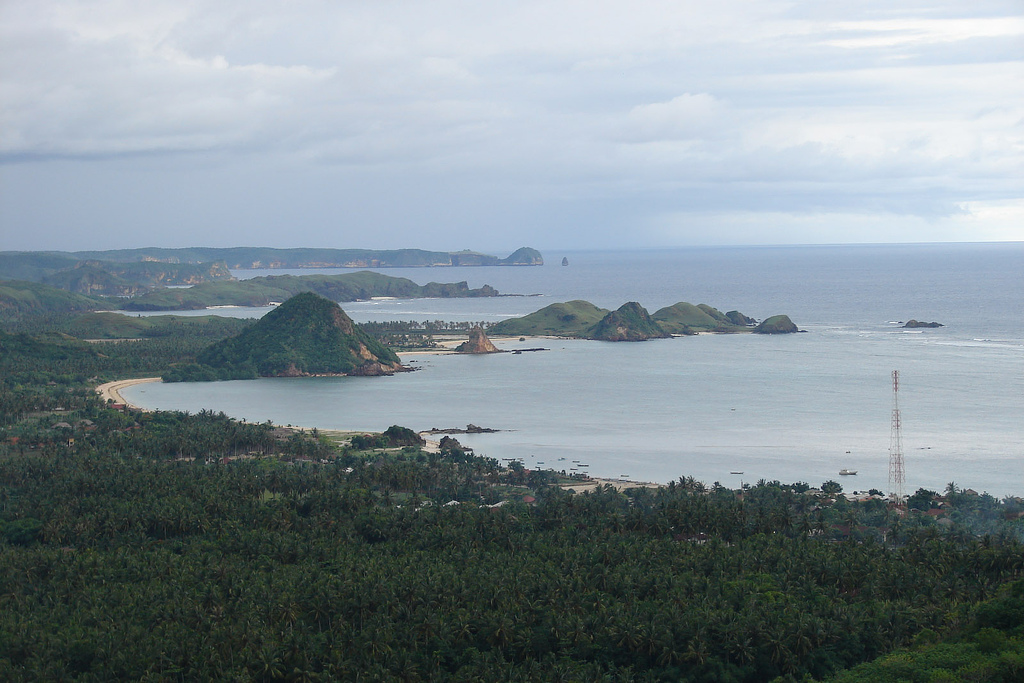

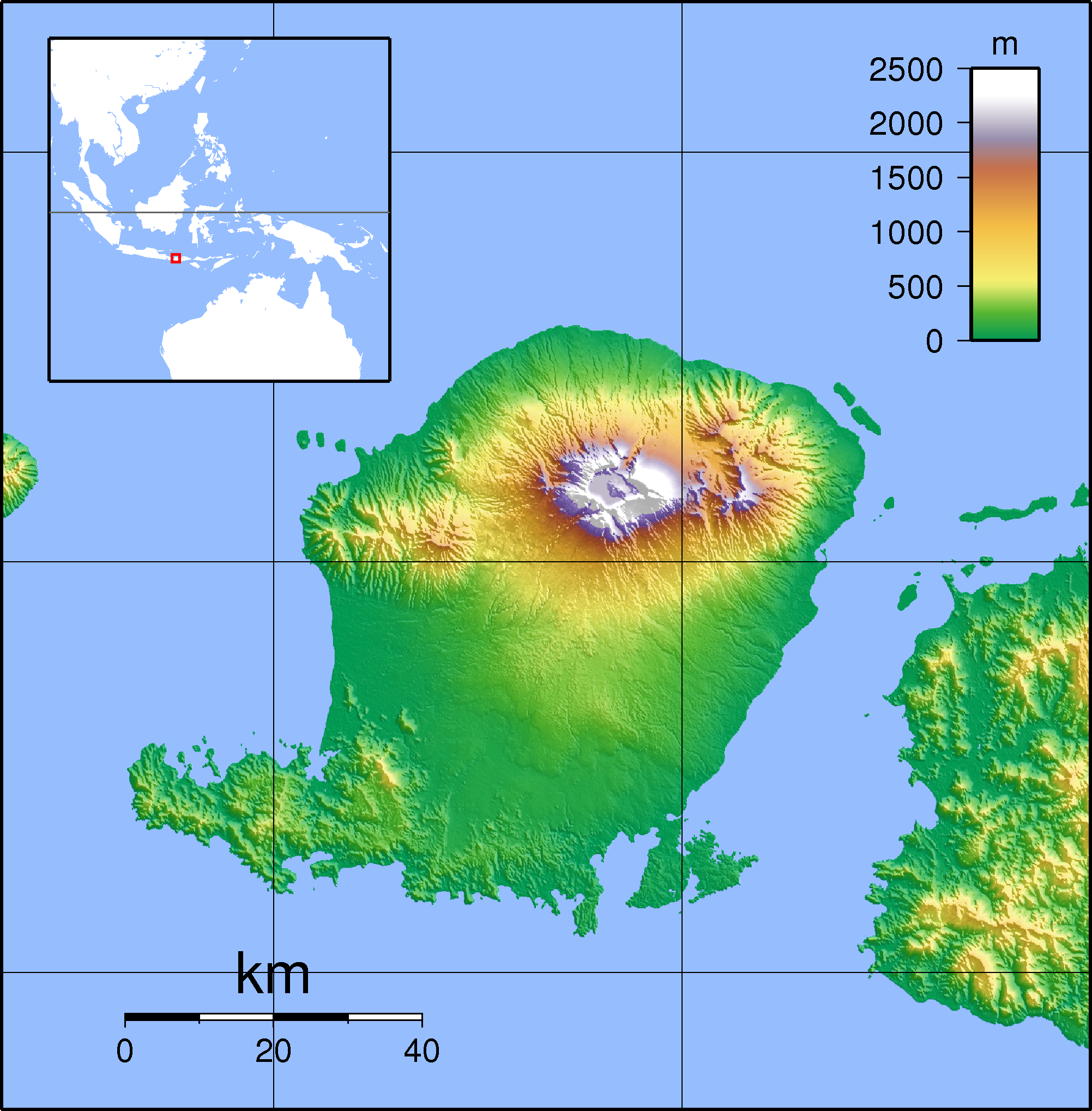
- Location in Indonesia Mandalika (Indonesia)
- Coordinates: 8.894477°S 116.291374°E
- Country: Indonesia
- Province: West Nusa Tenggara
- Regency: Central Lombok
- Established (Special economic zone): 1 July 2014

Area
  - Total: 10.36 km^{2} (4.00 sq mi)
- Time zone: UTC+08:00

Mandalika is a coastal resort area in Central Lombok Regency, West Nusa Tenggara, Indonesia. It is designated as a special economic zone (Kawasan Ekonomi Khusus / KEK) which stretches over 1,035.67 hectares of the southern coast of the island of Lombok. Mandalika is 17 km straight from Lombok International Airport and approximately 50 km from the city centre of Mataram, the province's capital. It was inaugurated by Indonesian President Joko Widodo on 20 October 2017.

== History ==
The Indonesian government sold Mandalika to the Dubai Development Corporation for US$240 million in 2007. Due to the 2008 financial crisis, funding dwindled, so the Emirates had no choice but to sell Mandalika back to the Indonesian government for half of the purchase price. The Indonesian then-President Susilo Bambang Yudhoyono officiated at the groundbreaking ceremony of the Mandalika development project on 21 October 2011.

Six Memorandums of Understanding (MoU) on the development of the site were signed in conjunction with the ceremony. The proposal to grant special economic zone status to Mandalika resort area was based upon Law No. 30/2011 of the regulations covering Special Economic Zones and included in Government Regulation Number 2/2011 (on the Implementation of the Special Economic Zones). Government of Qatar signed a memorandum of understanding in 2018 to invest $500 million in the area.

== Development ==
The Mandalika Resort Development Project is planned to be undertaken in an area of about 1,200 hectares site in Kuta, Pujut subdistrict and has a projected value of US$3 billion, which include approx 7.5 kilometers of white-sand beaches. Plans have been detailed for hotel, villa and a high end resort projects. A Formula One circuit, a plenary room for concert events, a seaport for excursions and other ships, an integrated Disneyland-styled theme park, an underwater park, a golf course, mangrove park, an eco park, and a technical park have all been proposed.

Mandalika resort area is managed by the state-owned Indonesian Tourism Development Corporation (ITDC), which has five beaches in southern part of Lombok: Kuta Beach, Serenting Beach, Aan Cape, Keliuw Beach and Gerupuk Beach. The area of 1,179 hectares will be divided in three zones:

- luxury residences in the west part
- hotels, villas and public utilities in the central part
- exclusive hotels and villas in the east part

Mandalika resort area is expected to have 2,000 hotel rooms and attract up to 2 million foreign tourists annually by 2019. Hotels under construction in the resort area are:

- Pullman Hotel- 270 rooms; its construction began in October 2017.
- Royal Tulip Hotel- 198 rooms; started on 26 March 2018.
- X2 Hotel- 240 room
- Club Med Hotel- 350 rooms
- Grand Mercure Hotel- 342 rooms
- Aloft by Marriot Hotel, 173 rooms
- Paramount Lombok Resort and Residences is being constructed on a plot of land measuring 7.65 hectares. The hotel with 1500 rooms would be operated by hospitality firm Paramount Hotels and Resorts, which is expected to be completed in 2020.

== Racing circuit ==
Mandalika International Street Circuit

The Mandalika Circuit, a venue for MotoGP and Superbike World Championship will be delivered by Vinci Grand Projects. The sports cluster and entertainment project, measuring 120 hectares, with 195,700 capacity, will eventually include the construction of hotels and other facilities. As part of the conservation maintenance, the vegetation that provides the backdrop to the Mandalika Resort area will be set aside as a conservation area of over 3000 hectares. This area with many native species will only be accessible for low-impact activities, such as cycling or hiking to minimize damage to the flora and fauna.

On 23 February 2019, it was announced that the circuit would host the returning Indonesian motorcycle Grand Prix in 2021. The track will be 4.320 kilometres in length with 17 corners.

In April 2021, it was announced that the race circuit layout and surface were completed, but without the associated infrastructure. Officials from MotoGP™ organisers (Dorna) inspected the track, but no race was scheduled for 2021; World Superbike event was still possible later in the year, depending on travel quarantine requirements.

The project was heavily criticised by the United Nations, due to reports of locals being dispossessed of their homes, lands and livelihoods.
