= 2019 Moto3 World Championship =

8th running of the Moto3 World Championship

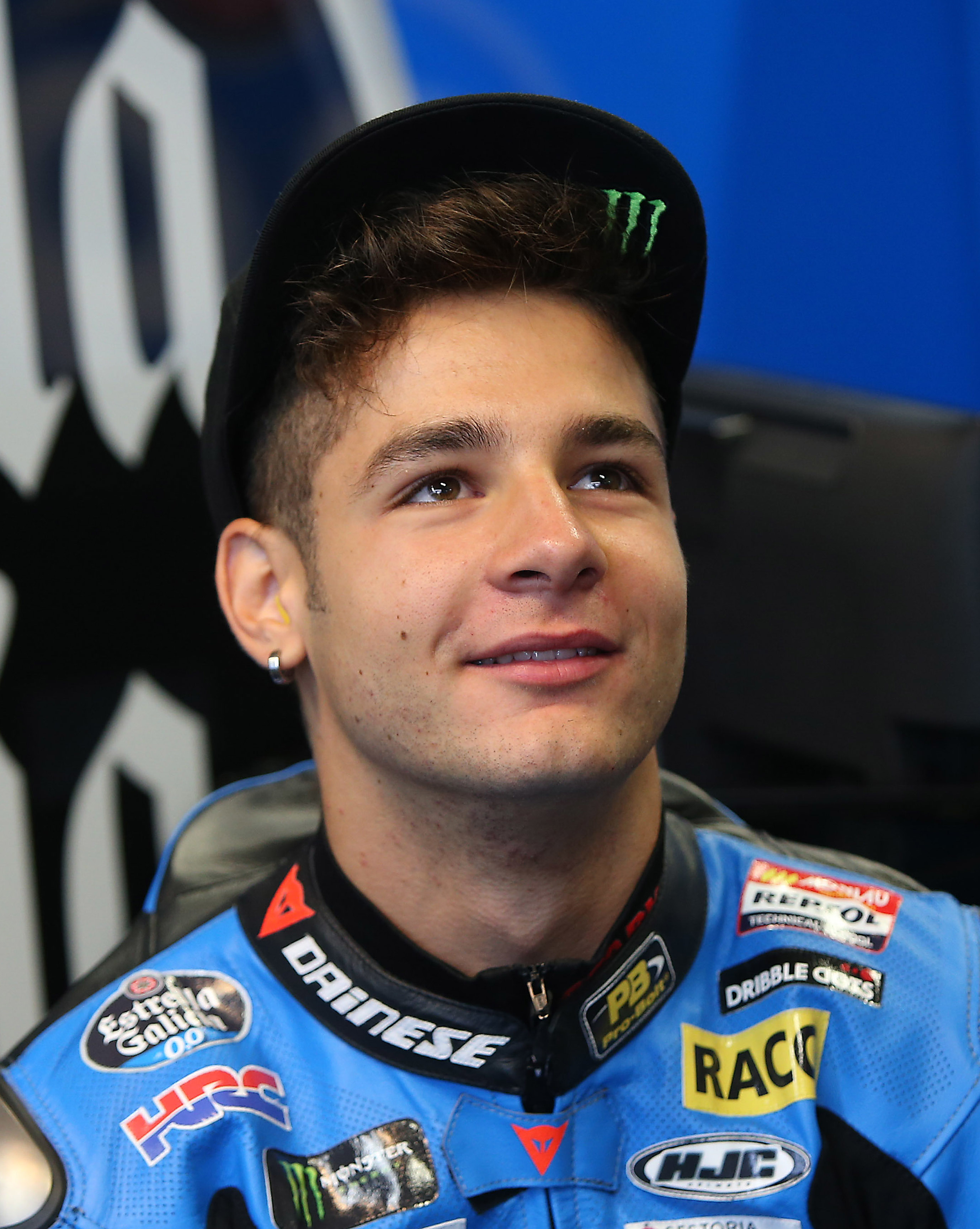
Lorenzo Dalla Porta (pictured in 2016) was the 2019 Moto3 World Riders' Champion.

The 2019 FIM Moto3 World Championship was the lightweight class of the 71st Fédération Internationale de Motocyclisme (FIM) Road Racing World Championship season. Jorge Martín was the reigning series champion, but he did not defend his title as he joined Moto2.

After winning at Phillip Island, Italian rider Lorenzo Dalla Porta was crowned the 2019 Moto3 World Champion, having created an unassailable lead of 72 points over current runner-up Arón Canet.

== Teams and riders ==
Team	Constructor	Motorcycle	No.	Rider	Rounds
(Spain) Estrella Galicia 0,0	Honda	NSF250RW	11	(Spain) Sergio García	2–19
(Spain) Estrella Galicia 0,0	Honda	NSF250RW	6	(Japan) Ryusei Yamanaka	1
(Spain) Estrella Galicia 0,0	Honda	NSF250RW	21	(Spain) Alonso López	All
(Spain) Estrella Galicia 0,0	Honda	NSF250RW	6	(Japan) Ryusei Yamanaka	6–7, 16
(Japan) Honda Team Asia	Honda	NSF250RW	27	(Japan) Kaito Toba	All
(Japan) Honda Team Asia	Honda	NSF250RW	79	(Japan) Ai Ogura	1–5, 7–19
(Japan) Honda Team Asia	Honda	NSF250RW	31	(Indonesia) Gerry Salim	6
(Japan) Honda Team Asia	Honda	NSF250RW	33	(Japan) Yuki Kunii	10
(Italy) Kömmerling Gresini Moto3	Honda	NSF250RW	19	(Argentina) Gabriel Rodrigo	1–10, 13–18
(Italy) Kömmerling Gresini Moto3	Honda	NSF250RW	52	(Spain) Jeremy Alcoba	11–12, 19
(Italy) Kömmerling Gresini Moto3	Honda	NSF250RW	54	(Italy) Riccardo Rossi	All
(Japan) Team Anija Club Y's	Honda	NSF250RW	36	(Japan) Sho Hasegawa	16
(Luxembourg) Leopard Racing	Honda	NSF250RW	42	(Spain) Marcos Ramírez	All
(Luxembourg) Leopard Racing	Honda	NSF250RW	48	(Italy) Lorenzo Dalla Porta	All
(Luxembourg) Leopard Impala Junior Team	Honda	NSF250RW	4	(Spain) Xavier Artigas	19
(Malaysia) Petronas Sprinta Racing	Honda	NSF250RW	17	(United Kingdom) John McPhee	All
(Malaysia) Petronas Sprinta Racing	Honda	NSF250RW	71	(Japan) Ayumu Sasaki	All
(Italy) Sic58 Squadra Corse	Honda	NSF250RW	23	(Italy) Niccolò Antonelli	1–13, 16–19
(Italy) Sic58 Squadra Corse	Honda	NSF250RW	32	(Italy) Davide Pizzoli	14
(Italy) Sic58 Squadra Corse	Honda	NSF250RW	3	(Italy) Kevin Zannoni	15
(Italy) Sic58 Squadra Corse	Honda	NSF250RW	24	(Japan) Tatsuki Suzuki	All
(Italy) VNE Snipers	Honda	NSF250RW	14	(Italy) Tony Arbolino	All
(Italy) VNE Snipers	Honda	NSF250RW	55	(Italy) Romano Fenati	1–13, 16–19
(Italy) VNE Snipers	Honda	NSF250RW	10	(Spain) José Julián García	14–15
(Australia) Double Six Motor Sport	Kalex KTM	Moto3	9	(Australia) Yanni Shaw	17
(Australia) Double Six Motor Sport	Kalex KTM	Moto3	15	(New Zealand) Rogan Chandler	17
(United Arab Emirates) Bester Capital Dubai (Luxembourg) WorldWideRace (Japan) Mugen Race	KTM	RC250GP	5	(Spain) Jaume Masiá	1–14, 16–19
(United Arab Emirates) Bester Capital Dubai (Luxembourg) WorldWideRace (Japan) Mugen Race	KTM	RC250GP	32	(Italy) Davide Pizzoli	15
(United Arab Emirates) Bester Capital Dubai (Luxembourg) WorldWideRace (Japan) Mugen Race	KTM	RC250GP	16	(Italy) Andrea Migno	All
(Netherlands) Qnium Racing	KTM	RC250GP	18	(Netherlands) Ryan van de Lagemaat	8
(Spain) Boé Skull Rider Mugen Race	KTM	RC250GP	22	(Japan) Kazuki Masaki	All
(Spain) Boé Skull Rider Mugen Race	KTM	RC250GP	76	(Kazakhstan) Makar Yurchenko	All
(France) CIP Green Power	KTM	RC250GP	40	(South Africa) Darryn Binder	All
(France) CIP Green Power	KTM	RC250GP	69	(United Kingdom) Tom Booth-Amos	All
(Germany) Kiefer Racing	KTM	RC250GP	28	(Germany) Dirk Geiger	9
(Spain) Reale Avintia Arizona 77	KTM	RC250GP	77	(Spain) Vicente Pérez	1–7
(Spain) Reale Avintia Arizona 77	KTM	RC250GP	82	(Italy) Stefano Nepa	8–19
(Spain) Fundacion Andreas Perez 77	KTM	RC250GP	82	(Italy) Stefano Nepa	4
(Spain) Fundacion Andreas Perez 77	KTM	RC250GP	83	(Brazil) Meikon Kawakami	4, 13
(Spain) Fundacion Andreas Perez 77	KTM	RC250GP	99	(Spain) Carlos Tatay	7, 14, 19
(Finland) Red Bull KTM Ajo	KTM	RC250GP	61	(Turkey) Can Öncü	1–13, 16–19 (Note: Can Öncü competed in the first Friday practice session during round 13, before being replaced by Deniz Öncü.)
(Finland) Red Bull KTM Ajo	KTM	RC250GP	53	(Turkey) Deniz Öncü	13–15
(Finland) Red Bull KTM Ajo	KTM	RC250GP	53	(Turkey) Deniz Öncü	10–11
(Germany) Redox PrüstelGP	KTM	RC250GP	12	(Czech Republic) Filip Salač	All
(Germany) Redox PrüstelGP	KTM	RC250GP	84	(Czech Republic) Jakub Kornfeil	All
(Spain) Sama Qatar Ángel Nieto Team (Spain) Gaviota Ángel Nieto Team (Spain) Valresa Ángel Nieto Team	KTM	RC250GP	25	(Spain) Raúl Fernández	All
(Spain) Sama Qatar Ángel Nieto Team (Spain) Gaviota Ángel Nieto Team (Spain) Valresa Ángel Nieto Team	KTM	RC250GP	75	(Spain) Albert Arenas	1, 4–19
(Spain) Sama Qatar Ángel Nieto Team (Spain) Gaviota Ángel Nieto Team (Spain) Valresa Ángel Nieto Team	KTM	RC250GP	81	(Spain) Aleix Viu	2–3
(Spain) Sama Qatar Ángel Nieto Team (Spain) Gaviota Ángel Nieto Team (Spain) Valresa Ángel Nieto Team	KTM	RC250GP	73	(Austria) Maximilian Kofler	11–12
(Italy) Sky Racing Team VR46 (Italy) Sky Junior Team VR46	KTM	RC250GP	7	(Italy) Dennis Foggia	All
(Italy) Sky Racing Team VR46 (Italy) Sky Junior Team VR46	KTM	RC250GP	13	(Italy) Celestino Vietti	All
(Italy) Sky Racing Team VR46 (Italy) Sky Junior Team VR46	KTM	RC250GP	20	(San Marino) Elia Bartolini	13
(Italy) Sterilgarda Max Racing Team	KTM	RC250GP	44	(Spain) Arón Canet	All
(Spain) Baiko Racing Team	KTM	RC250GP	67	(Spain) Gerard Riu	14
(United Kingdom) FPW Racing	KTM	RC250GP	96	(United States) Brandon Paasch	12
(Italy) TM Official Team	TM Racing	TM Racing	3	(Italy) Kevin Zannoni	6

Key
Regular rider
Replacement rider
Wildcard rider

All the bikes used series-specified Dunlop tyres.

=== Team changes ===
- Marinelli Snipers Team expanded to two bikes again after the team's withdrawal from Moto2.
- Max Biaggi's team, Max Racing Team, made its World Championship debut after he signed a partnership deal with Peter Öttl's race team, Südmetal Schedl GP Racing.

=== Rider changes ===
- Philipp Öttl moved up to Moto2 with Red Bull KTM Tech3.
- Both Fabio Di Giannantonio and Jorge Martín moved up to Moto2, joining Speed Up Racing and Red Bull KTM Ajo respectively.
- Raúl Fernández made his full season debut with Ángel Nieto Team, replacing Andrea Migno who moved to Bester Capital Dubai.
- Filip Salač made his full season debut with Redox PrüstelGP as a teammate of Jakub Kornfeil, replacing Marco Bezzecchi who moved up to Moto2 with Red Bull KTM Tech3.
- Celestino Vietti made his full season debut with Sky Racing Team VR46, replacing Nicolò Bulega who moved up to Moto2 with the same team.
- Makar Yurchenko returned to Moto3 with Boé Skull Rider Mugen Race.
- John McPhee left CIP Green Power to join Petronas Sprinta Racing, replacing Adam Norrodin who moved to the CEV Moto2 European Championship with the same team.
- Marcos Ramírez left Bester Capital Dubai to join Leopard Racing, replacing Enea Bastianini who moved up to Moto2 with Italtrans Racing Team.
- Sergio García made his full season debut with Estrella Galicia 0,0, replacing Arón Canet who moved to Max Racing Team.
- Ai Ogura made his full season debut with Honda Team Asia, replacing Nakarin Atiratphuvapat.
- Gabriel Rodrigo left RBA Racing Team and joined Kömmerling Gresini Moto3 alongside rookie Riccardo Rossi.
- Romano Fenati returned to Moto3 with VNE Snipers after one season in Moto2 after his contract with Forward Racing was terminated following the controversial incident at the 2018 San Marino Grand Prix with Stefano Manzi.
- Can Öncü made his full season debut with Red Bull KTM Ajo, replacing Darryn Binder who moved to CIP Green Power. Öncü was allowed to race despite being below the minimum age of 16 as he received a special dispensation by Dorna after winning the 2018 Red Bull MotoGP Rookies Cup.
- Tom Booth-Amos made his full season debut with CIP Green Power.

==== Mid-season changes ====
- Ryusei Yamanaka replaced Sergio García for the first race due to age restriction.
- Vicente Pérez was dropped due to poor results and replaced by Stefano Nepa from the Dutch TT onwards.

== Rule changes ==
This class and Moto2 adopted the qualifying format used by MotoGP for the season, in which the riders that placed 15th or lower on combined times in the third free practice session would be admitted to qualifying 1, then the four fastest riders from that session would join the fastest 14 riders in qualifying 2.

The season saw the introduction of a new penalty called the "Long Lap" penalty for infractions such as exceeding track limits or engaging in reckless riding. At each circuit, a route is to be defined and marked at a safe point around the circuit (usually an asphalt run-off area outside of a turn). The penalised rider must ride through the defined area within 3 laps of being notified, thereby suffering a penalty equivalent typically to 2 or more seconds on that lap.

== Calendar ==
The following Grands Prix took place during the season:

Round	Date	Grand Prix	Circuit
1	10 March (Note: Night race)	VisitQatar Grand Prix	Lusail International Circuit, Lusail
2	31 March	Gran Premio Motul de la República Argentina	Autódromo Termas de Río Hondo, Termas de Río Hondo
3	14 April	(United States) Red Bull Grand Prix of The Americas	Circuit of the Americas, Austin
4	5 May	(Spain) Gran Premio Red Bull de España	Circuito de Jerez, Jerez de la Frontera
5	19 May	Shark Helmets Grand Prix de France	Bugatti Circuit, Le Mans
6	2 June	(Italy) Gran Premio d'Italia Oakley	Mugello Circuit, Scarperia e San Piero
7	16 June	(Catalonia) Gran Premi Monster Energy de Catalunya	Circuit de Barcelona-Catalunya, Montmeló
8	30 June	(Netherlands) Motul TT Assen	TT Circuit Assen, Assen
9	7 July	(Germany) HJC Helmets Motorrad Grand Prix Deutschland	Sachsenring, Hohenstein-Ernstthal
10	4 August	(Czech Republic) Monster Energy Grand Prix České republiky	Brno Circuit, Brno
11	11 August	(Austria) myWorld Motorrad Grand Prix von Österreich	Red Bull Ring, Spielberg
12	25 August	(United Kingdom) GoPro British Grand Prix	Silverstone Circuit, Silverstone
13	15 September	Gran Premio Octo di San Marino e della Riviera di Rimini	Misano World Circuit, Misano Adriatico
14	22 September	(Aragon) Gran Premio Michelin de Aragón	MotorLand Aragón, Alcañiz
15	6 October	PTT Thailand Grand Prix	Buriram International Circuit, Buriram
16	20 October	Motul Grand Prix of Japan	Motegi Circuit, Motegi
17	27 October	(Australia) Pramac Generac Australian Motorcycle Grand Prix	Phillip Island Grand Prix Circuit, Phillip Island
18	3 November	Shell Malaysia Motorcycle Grand Prix	Sepang International Circuit, Sepang
19	17 November	(Valencian Community) Gran Premio Motul de la Comunitat Valenciana	Circuit Ricardo Tormo, Valencia

== Results and standings ==
=== Grands Prix ===
Round	Grand Prix	Pole position	Fastest lap	Winning rider	Winning team	Winning constructor	Report
1	Qatar motorcycle Grand Prix	(Spain) Arón Canet	(Italy) Romano Fenati	(Japan) Kaito Toba	(Japan) Honda Team Asia	(Japan) Honda	Report
2	(Argentina) Argentine Republic motorcycle Grand Prix	(Spain) Jaume Masiá	(Argentina) Gabriel Rodrigo	(Spain) Jaume Masiá	(United Arab Emirates) Bester Capital Dubai	(Austria) KTM	Report
3	(United States) Motorcycle Grand Prix of the Americas	(Italy) Niccolò Antonelli	(Spain) Alonso López	(Spain) Arón Canet	(Italy) Sterilgarda Max Racing Team	(Austria) KTM	Report
4	(Spain) Spanish motorcycle Grand Prix	(Italy) Lorenzo Dalla Porta	(United Kingdom) John McPhee	(Italy) Niccolò Antonelli	(Italy) Sic58 Squadra Corse	(Japan) Honda	Report
5	(France) French motorcycle Grand Prix	(United Kingdom) John McPhee	(Spain) Jaume Masiá	(United Kingdom) John McPhee	(Malaysia) Petronas Sprinta Racing	(Japan) Honda	Report
6	(Italy) Italian motorcycle Grand Prix	(Italy) Tony Arbolino	(Italy) Niccolò Antonelli	(Italy) Tony Arbolino	(Italy) VNE Snipers	(Japan) Honda	Report
7	(Catalonia) Catalan motorcycle Grand Prix	(Argentina) Gabriel Rodrigo	(Japan) Kaito Toba	(Spain) Marcos Ramírez	(Luxembourg) Leopard Racing	(Japan) Honda	Report
8	(Netherlands) Dutch TT	(Italy) Niccolò Antonelli	(Italy) Dennis Foggia	(Italy) Tony Arbolino	(Italy) VNE Snipers	(Japan) Honda	Report
9	(Germany) German motorcycle Grand Prix	(Japan) Ayumu Sasaki	(Turkey) Can Öncü	(Italy) Lorenzo Dalla Porta	(Luxembourg) Leopard Racing	(Japan) Honda	Report
10	Czech Republic motorcycle Grand Prix	(Italy) Tony Arbolino	(Italy) Niccolò Antonelli	(Spain) Arón Canet	(Italy) Sterilgarda Max Racing Team	(Austria) KTM	Report
11	(Austria) Austrian motorcycle Grand Prix	(United Kingdom) John McPhee	(Italy) Celestino Vietti	(Italy) Romano Fenati	(Italy) VNE Snipers	(Japan) Honda	Report
12	(United Kingdom) British motorcycle Grand Prix	(Italy) Tony Arbolino	(Japan) Tatsuki Suzuki	(Spain) Marcos Ramírez	(Luxembourg) Leopard Racing	(Japan) Honda	Report
13	San Marino and Rimini Riviera motorcycle Grand Prix	(Japan) Tatsuki Suzuki	(Italy) Andrea Migno	(Japan) Tatsuki Suzuki	(Italy) Sic58 Squadra Corse	(Japan) Honda	Report
14	Aragon motorcycle Grand Prix	(Spain) Arón Canet	(South Africa) Darryn Binder	(Spain) Arón Canet	(Italy) Sterilgarda Max Racing Team	(Austria) KTM	Report
15	Thailand motorcycle Grand Prix	(Italy) Celestino Vietti	(Japan) Ai Ogura	(Spain) Albert Arenas	(Spain) Gaviota Ángel Nieto Team	(Austria) KTM	Report
16	(Japan) Japanese motorcycle Grand Prix	(Italy) Niccolò Antonelli	(Italy) Lorenzo Dalla Porta	(Italy) Lorenzo Dalla Porta	(Luxembourg) Leopard Racing	(Japan) Honda	Report
17	(Australia) Australian motorcycle Grand Prix	(Spain) Marcos Ramírez	(Italy) Romano Fenati	(Italy) Lorenzo Dalla Porta	(Luxembourg) Leopard Racing	(Japan) Honda	Report
18	(Malaysia) Malaysian motorcycle Grand Prix	(Spain) Marcos Ramírez	(Spain) Marcos Ramírez	(Italy) Lorenzo Dalla Porta	(Luxembourg) Leopard Racing	(Japan) Honda	Report
19	Valencian Community motorcycle Grand Prix	(Italy) Andrea Migno	(Japan) Tatsuki Suzuki	(Spain) Sergio García	(Spain) Estrella Galicia 0,0	(Japan) Honda	Report

=== Riders' standings ===
Scoring system

Points were awarded to the top fifteen finishers. A rider had to finish the race to earn points.

Position	1st	2nd	3rd	4th	5th	6th	7th	8th	9th	10th	11th	12th	13th	14th	15th
Points	25	20	16	13	11	10	9	8	7	6	5	4	3	2	1

Pos.	Rider	Bike	Team	QAT (Qatar)	ARG (Argentina)	AME (United States)	SPA (Spain)	FRA (France)	ITA (Italy)	CAT (Catalonia)	NED (Netherlands)	GER (Germany)	CZE (Czech Republic)	AUT (Austria)	GBR (United Kingdom)	RSM (San Marino)	ARA (Aragon)	THA (Thailand)	JPN (Japan)	AUS (Australia)	MAL (Malaysia)	VAL (Valencian Community)	Pts
1	(Italy) Lorenzo Dalla Porta	Honda	Leopard Racing	2	7	13	8^{P}	2	2	Ret	2	1	2	6	3	8	11	2	1^{F}	1	1	21	279
2	(Spain) Arón Canet	KTM	Sterilgarda Max Racing Team	3^{P}	12	1	4	3	7	2	12	3	1	10	13	Ret	1^{P}	NC	Ret	Ret	8	6	200
3	(Spain) Marcos Ramírez	Honda	Leopard Racing	4	9	12	23	Ret	Ret	1	7	2	16	5	1	7	Ret	4	8	2^{P}	6^{P F}	7	183
4	(Italy) Tony Arbolino	Honda	VNE Snipers	16	3	6	17	Ret	1^{P}	Ret	1	15	3^{P}	2	2^{P}	3	10	10	Ret	9	9	Ret	175
5	(United Kingdom) John McPhee	Honda	Petronas Sprinta Racing	13	21	14	12^{F}	1^{P}	6	13	5	6	Ret	3^{P}	7	2	4	Ret	6	5	7	Ret	156
6	(Italy) Celestino Vietti	KTM	Sky Racing Team VR46	5	14	9	3	7	9	3	Ret	Ret	19	4^{F}	9	Ret	14	6^{P}	3	Ret	5	8	135
7	(Italy) Niccolò Antonelli	Honda	Sic58 Squadra Corse	8	4	5^{P}	1	Ret	4^{F}	11	8^{P}	12	5^{F}	9	4	Ret			12^{P}	DNS	10	DNS	128
8	(Japan) Tatsuki Suzuki	Honda	Sic58 Squadra Corse	Ret	13	Ret	2	Ret	8	19	Ret	8	Ret	Ret	5^{F}	1^{P}	6	Ret	4	4	Ret	4^{F}	124
9	(Spain) Jaume Masiá	KTM	Mugen Race	Ret	1^{P}	2	Ret	12^{F}	3	Ret	Ret	16	4	Ret	11	4	Ret		7	Ret	3	DNS	121
10	(Japan) Ai Ogura	Honda	Honda Team Asia	11	17	11	9	Ret		6	6	7	6	12	10	Ret	2	Ret^{F}	14	14	4	10	109
11	(Spain) Albert Arenas	KTM	Valresa Ángel Nieto Team	6			5	11	12	Ret	Ret	21	Ret	11	Ret	Ret	8	1	2	3	12	20	108
12	(Italy) Dennis Foggia	KTM	Sky Racing Team VR46	Ret	8	10	16	Ret	5	5	9^{F}	Ret	15	14	8	5	3	5	23	11	19	DNS	97
13	(Italy) Andrea Migno	KTM	Mugen Race	14	11	3	10	5	Ret	Ret	19	19	7	26	17	13^{F}	16	NC	10	Ret	Ret	2^{P}	78
14	(Czech Republic) Jakub Kornfeil	KTM	Redox PrüstelGP	10	24	Ret	7	9	14	10	3	10	9	8	16	12	15	12	Ret	15	17	15	78
15	(Spain) Sergio García	Honda	Estrella Galicia 0,0		DNS	19	Ret	Ret	13	Ret	15	11	Ret	27	19	Ret	7	14	5	Ret	2	1	76
16	(Italy) Romano Fenati	Honda	VNE Snipers	9^{F}	16	Ret	Ret	Ret	Ret	7	11	4	8	1	Ret	DNS			Ret	12^{F}	11	17	76
17	(Spain) Alonso López	Honda	Estrella Galicia 0,0	12	Ret	8^{F}	14	Ret	Ret	4	10	Ret	Ret	16	15	Ret	5	3	9	13	Ret	NC	71
18	(Argentina) Gabriel Rodrigo	Honda	Kömmerling Gresini Moto3	15	6^{F}	4	Ret	4	Ret	Ret^{P}	4	Ret	DNS			6	9	DNS	Ret	Ret	Ret		67
19	(Japan) Kaito Toba	Honda	Honda Team Asia	1	10	Ret	6	6	Ret	Ret^{F}	Ret	Ret	Ret	18	20	Ret	DNS	7	17	Ret	Ret	13	63
20	(Japan) Ayumu Sasaki	Honda	Petronas Sprinta Racing	Ret	5	Ret	15	14	Ret	8	17	9^{P}	11	13	6	Ret	13	Ret	13	7	Ret	19	62
21	(Spain) Raúl Fernández	KTM	Valresa Ángel Nieto Team	7	15	7	Ret	10	11	Ret	Ret	5	12	Ret	18	10	21	9	19	Ret	14	Ret	60
22	(South Africa) Darryn Binder	KTM	CIP Green Power	Ret	2	15	11	Ret	10	15	Ret	Ret	10	15	12	Ret	17^{F}	20	Ret	6	Ret	Ret	54
23	(Czech Republic) Filip Salač	KTM	Redox PrüstelGP	21	25	20	Ret	15	20	Ret	14	13	Ret	19	21	9	18	11	22	Ret	13	5	32
24	(Kazakhstan) Makar Yurchenko	KTM	Boé Skull Rider Mugen Race	23	20	18	Ret	13	15	Ret	18	20	13	7	23	Ret	28	15	11	18	16	9	29
25	(Italy) Stefano Nepa	KTM	Reale Avintia Arizona 77				19				20	18	17	22	22	11	23	8	16	10	Ret	11	24
26	(Spain) Xavier Artigas	Honda	Leopard Impala Junior Team																			3	16
27	(Japan) Kazuki Masaki	KTM	Boé Skull Rider Mugen Race	19	23	16	13	8	Ret	16	13	17	Ret	24	26	Ret	25	18	20	17	18	16	14
28	(United Kingdom) Tom Booth-Amos	KTM	CIP Green Power	24	18	Ret	Ret	17	Ret	14	23	24	Ret	25	25	Ret	27	Ret	24	8	21	18	10
29	(Japan) Ryusei Yamanaka	Honda	Estrella Galicia 0,0	20					17	9									15				8
30	(Spain) Carlos Tatay	KTM	Fundacion Andreas Perez 77							12							12					DNS	8
31	(Turkey) Can Öncü	KTM	Red Bull KTM Ajo	18	26	Ret	18	16	18	Ret	16	14^{F}	14	Ret	24	WD			18	16	20	12	8
32	(Italy) Riccardo Rossi	Honda	Kömmerling Gresini Moto3	22	22	21	21	Ret	21	17	21	22	Ret	23	27	14	26	13	21	Ret	15	14	8
33	(Spain) Jeremy Alcoba	Honda	Kömmerling Gresini Moto3											21	14							DNS	2
34	(San Marino) Elia Bartolini	KTM	Sky Junior Team VR46													15							1
35	(Turkey) Deniz Öncü	KTM	Red Bull KTM Ajo										18	17		16	24	19					0
36	(Italy) Davide Pizzoli	Honda	Sic58 Squadra Corse														22						0
36	(Italy) Davide Pizzoli	KTM	Mugen Race															16					0
37	(Indonesia) Gerry Salim	Honda	Honda Team Asia						16														0
38	(Spain) Vicente Pérez	KTM	Reale Avintia Arizona 77	17	Ret	17	20	Ret	19	18													0
39	(Italy) Kevin Zannoni	TM Racing	TM Official Team						Ret														0
39	(Italy) Kevin Zannoni	Honda	Sic58 Squadra Corse															17					0
40	(New Zealand) Rogan Chandler	Kalex KTM	Double Six Motor Sport																	19			0
41	(Spain) Gerard Riu	KTM	Baiko Racing Team														19						0
42	(Spain) Aleix Viu	KTM	Sama Qatar Ángel Nieto Team		19	Ret																	0
43	(Austria) Maximilian Kofler	KTM	Sama Qatar Ángel Nieto Team											20	28								0
44	(Spain) José Julián García	Honda	VNE Snipers														20	Ret					0
45	(Netherlands) Ryan van de Lagemaat	KTM	Qnium Racing								22												0
46	(Brazil) Meikon Kawakami	KTM	Fundacion Andreas Perez 77				22									Ret							0
47	(Germany) Dirk Geiger	KTM	Kiefer Racing									23											0
48	(United States) Brandon Paasch	KTM	FPW Racing												29								0
	(Japan) Yuki Kunii	Honda	Honda Team Asia										Ret										0
	(Australia) Yanni Shaw	Kalex KTM	Double Six Motor Sport																	Ret			0
	(Japan) Sho Hasegawa	Honda	Team Anija Club Y's																DNQ				0
Pos.	Rider	Bike	Team	QAT (Qatar)	ARG (Argentina)	AME (United States)	SPA (Spain)	FRA (France)	ITA (Italy)	CAT (Catalonia)	NED (Netherlands)	GER (Germany)	CZE (Czech Republic)	AUT (Austria)	GBR (United Kingdom)	RSM (San Marino)	ARA (Aragon)	THA (Thailand)	JPN (Japan)	AUS (Australia)	MAL (Malaysia)	VAL (Valencian Community)	Pts

Race key
Colour	Result
Gold	Winner
Silver	2nd place
Bronze	3rd place
Green	Points finish
Blue	Non-points finish
Blue	Non-classified finish (NC)
Purple	Retired (Ret)
Red	Did not qualify (DNQ)
Black	Disqualified (DSQ)
White	Did not start (DNS)
White	Withdrew (WD)
White	Race cancelled (C)
Blank	Did not practice (DNP)
Blank	Excluded (EX)
Blank	Did not arrive (DNA)
Blank	Did not enter (empty cell)
Annotation	Meaning
P	Pole position
F	Fastest lap
Rider key
Colour	Meaning
Light blue	Rookie rider

=== Constructors' standings ===
Each constructor received the same number of points as their best placed rider in each race.

Pos.	Constructor	QAT (Qatar)	ARG (Argentina)	AME (United States)	SPA (Spain)	FRA (France)	ITA (Italy)	CAT (Catalonia)	NED (Netherlands)	GER (Germany)	CZE (Czech Republic)	AUT (Austria)	GBR (United Kingdom)	RSM (San Marino)	ARA (Aragon)	THA (Thailand)	JPN (Japan)	AUS (Australia)	MAL (Malaysia)	VAL (Valencian Community)	Pts
1	(Japan) Honda	1	3	4	1	1	1	1	1	1	2	1	1	1	2	2	1	1	1	1	439
2	(Austria) KTM	3	1	1	3	3	3	2	3	3	1	4	8	4	1	1	2	3	3	2	347
	(Germany) Kalex KTM																	19			0
	(Italy) TM Racing						Ret														0
Pos.	Constructor	QAT (Qatar)	ARG (Argentina)	AME (United States)	SPA (Spain)	FRA (France)	ITA (Italy)	CAT (Catalonia)	NED (Netherlands)	GER (Germany)	CZE (Czech Republic)	AUT (Austria)	GBR (United Kingdom)	RSM (San Marino)	ARA (Aragon)	THA (Thailand)	JPN (Japan)	AUS (Australia)	MAL (Malaysia)	VAL (Valencian Community)	Pts

=== Teams' standings ===
The teams' standings were based on results obtained by regular and substitute riders; wild-card entries were ineligible.

Pos.	Team	Bike No.	QAT (Qatar)	ARG (Argentina)	AME (United States)	SPA (Spain)	FRA (France)	ITA (Italy)	CAT (Catalonia)	NED (Netherlands)	GER (Germany)	CZE (Czech Republic)	AUT (Austria)	GBR (United Kingdom)	RSM (San Marino)	ARA (Aragon)	THA (Thailand)	JPN (Japan)	AUS (Australia)	MAL (Malaysia)	VAL (Valencian Community)	Pts
1	(Luxembourg) Leopard Racing	42	4	9	12	23	Ret	Ret	1	7	2	16	5	1	7	Ret	4	8	2^{P}	6^{P F}	7	462
1	(Luxembourg) Leopard Racing	48	2	7	13	8^{P}	2	2	Ret	2	1	2	6	3	8	11	2	1^{F}	1	1	21	462
2	(Italy) Sic58 Squadra Corse	3															17					252
2	(Italy) Sic58 Squadra Corse	23	8	4	5^{P}	1	Ret	4^{F}	11	8^{P}	12	5^{F}	9	4	Ret			12^{P}	DNS	10	DNS	252
2	(Italy) Sic58 Squadra Corse	24	Ret	13	Ret	2	Ret	8	19	Ret	8	Ret	Ret	5^{F}	1^{P}	6	Ret	4	4	Ret	4^{F}	252
2	(Italy) Sic58 Squadra Corse	32														22						252
3	(Italy) VNE Snipers	10														20	Ret					251
3	(Italy) VNE Snipers	14	16	3	6	17	Ret	1^{P}	Ret	1	15	3^{P}	2	2^{P}	3	10	10	Ret	9	9	Ret	251
3	(Italy) VNE Snipers	55	9^{F}	16	Ret	Ret	Ret	Ret	7	11	4	8	1	Ret	DNS			Ret	12^{F}	11	17	251
4	(Italy) Sky Racing Team VR46	7	Ret	8	10	16	Ret	5	5	9^{F}	Ret	15	14	8	5	3	5	23	11	19	DNS	232
4	(Italy) Sky Racing Team VR46	13	5	14	9	3	7	9	3	Ret	Ret	19	4^{F}	9	Ret	14	6^{P}	3	Ret	5	8	232
5	(Malaysia) Petronas Sprinta Racing	17	13	21	14	12^{F}	1^{P}	6	13	5	6	Ret	3^{P}	7	2	4	Ret	6	5	7	Ret	218
5	(Malaysia) Petronas Sprinta Racing	71	Ret	5	Ret	15	14	Ret	8	17	9^{P}	11	13	6	Ret	13	Ret	13	7	Ret	19	218
6	(Italy) Sterilgarda Max Racing Team	44	3^{P}	12	1	4	3	7	2	12	3	1	10	13	Ret	1^{P}	NC	Ret	Ret	8	6	200
7	(Japan) Mugen Race	5	Ret	1^{P}	2	Ret	12^{F}	3	Ret	Ret	16	4	Ret	11	4	Ret		7	Ret	3	DNS	199
7	(Japan) Mugen Race	16	14	11	3	10	5	Ret	Ret	19	19	7	26	17	13^{F}	16	NC	10	Ret	Ret	2^{P}	199
7	(Japan) Mugen Race	32															16					199
8	(Japan) Honda Team Asia	27	1	10	Ret	6	6	Ret	Ret^{F}	Ret	Ret	Ret	18	20	Ret	DNS	7	17	Ret	Ret	13	172
8	(Japan) Honda Team Asia	31						16														172
8	(Japan) Honda Team Asia	79	11	17	11	9	Ret		6	6	7	6	12	10	Ret	2	Ret^{F}	14	14	4	10	172
9	(Spain) Ángel Nieto Team	25	7	15	7	Ret	10	11	Ret	Ret	5	12	Ret	18	10	21	9	19	Ret	14	Ret	168
9	(Spain) Ángel Nieto Team	75	6			5	11	12	Ret	Ret	21	Ret	11	Ret	Ret	8	1	2	3	12	20	168
9	(Spain) Ángel Nieto Team	81		19	Ret																	168
10	(Spain) Estrella Galicia 0,0	6	20																			147
10	(Spain) Estrella Galicia 0,0	11		DNS	19	Ret	Ret	13	Ret	15	11	Ret	27	19	Ret	7	14	5	Ret	2	1	147
10	(Spain) Estrella Galicia 0,0	21	12	Ret	8^{F}	14	Ret	Ret	4	10	Ret	Ret	16	15	Ret	5	3	9	13	Ret	NC	147
11	(Germany) Redox PrüstelGP	12	21	25	20	Ret	15	20	Ret	14	13	Ret	19	21	9	18	11	22	Ret	13	5	110
11	(Germany) Redox PrüstelGP	84	10	24	Ret	7	9	14	10	3	10	9	8	16	12	15	12	Ret	15	17	15	110
12	(Italy) Kömmerling Gresini Moto3	19	15	6^{F}	4	Ret	4	Ret	Ret^{P}	4	Ret	DNS			6	9	DNS	Ret	Ret	Ret		77
12	(Italy) Kömmerling Gresini Moto3	52											21	14							DNS	77
12	(Italy) Kömmerling Gresini Moto3	54	22	22	21	21	Ret	21	17	21	22	Ret	23	27	14	26	13	21	Ret	15	14	77
13	(France) CIP Green Power	40	Ret	2	15	11	Ret	10	15	Ret	Ret	10	15	12	Ret	17^{F}	20	Ret	6	Ret	Ret	64
13	(France) CIP Green Power	69	24	18	Ret	Ret	17	Ret	14	23	24	Ret	25	25	Ret	27	Ret	24	8	21	18	64
14	(Spain) Boé Skull Rider Mugen Race	22	19	23	16	13	8	Ret	16	13	17	Ret	24	26	Ret	25	18	20	17	18	16	43
14	(Spain) Boé Skull Rider Mugen Race	76	23	20	18	Ret	13	15	Ret	Ret	20	13	7	23	Ret	28	15	11	18	16	9	43
15	(Spain) Reale Avintia Arizona 77	77	17	Ret	17	20	Ret	19	18													24
15	(Spain) Reale Avintia Arizona 77	82								20	18	17	22	22	11	23	8	16	10	Ret	11	24
16	(Finland) Red Bull KTM Ajo	53													16	24	19					8
16	(Finland) Red Bull KTM Ajo	61	18	26	Ret	18	16	18	Ret	16	14^{F}	14	Ret	24	WD			18	16	20	12	8
Pos.	Team	Bike No.	QAT (Qatar)	ARG (Argentina)	AME (United States)	SPA (Spain)	FRA (France)	ITA (Italy)	CAT (Catalonia)	NED (Netherlands)	GER (Germany)	CZE (Czech Republic)	AUT (Austria)	GBR (United Kingdom)	RSM (San Marino)	ARA (Aragon)	THA (Thailand)	JPN (Japan)	AUS (Australia)	MAL (Malaysia)	VAL (Valencian Community)	Pts
