= Andi Farid Izdihar =

Indonesian motorcycle racer (born 1997)

- Born: 14 August 1997 (age 29); Bulukumba Regency, South Sulawesi, Indonesia
- Current team: Honda Team Asia
- Bike number: 27
Motorcycle racing career statistics
Moto2 World Championship
Active years	2019–2020
Manufacturers	Kalex
Championships	0
2020 championship position	NC (0 pts)
Starts / Wins / Podiums / Poles / F. laps / Points; 16 / 0 / 0 / 0 / 0 / 0
Moto3 World Championship
Active years	2021
Manufacturers	Honda
Championships	0
2021 championship position	29th (4 pts)
Starts / Wins / Podiums / Poles / F. laps / Points; 16 / 0 / 0 / 0 / 0 / 4

Andi Farid Izdihar, also known as Andi Gilang (born 14 August 1997), is a motorcycle racer from Indonesia who currently races in Asia Superbike 1000 class of Asia Road Racing Championship (ARRC). He previously participated in Moto3 for Honda Team Asia.

== Career ==
=== Early career ===
Izdihar was first introduced to motorcycle racing when he was eight years old, and started competing in local competitions in Bulukumba Regency at the age of ten. He later joined Astra Honda Racing young riders development program in 2010.

Between 2011 and 2013, Izdihar took part in Indospeed Race Series, riding a Honda CBR150R. He also participated in Region 2 Motoprix, racing for Honda Daya Golden team.

Izdihar was registered as a competitor in the motorcycling at 2016 Pekan Olahraga Nasional, representing West Java. He earned gold in the Underbone A individual, and silver in the Underbone A team.

=== Asia Talent Cup ===
Izdihar made his debut on international career level in 2014 Asia Dream Cup, where he was sixth in the final standings. After that, he was picked to compete in 2015 Asia Talent Cup. He won the race at Losail International Circuit, and finished 2nd at Sepang International Circuit. In total, he scored 104 points and was ranked ninth in the 2015 final standings. He also raced in Suzuka 4 Hours together with Aditya Pangestu as the pair finished second.

In 2016, Izdihar stayed racing in Asia Talent Cup. He won the second race at Losail, and first races of round 3 and 6 at Sepang. He competed against Thai rider, Somkiat Chantra, but his DNF results in the final round shattered his hopes of winning the Asia Talent Cup championship, an achievement earned by Somkiat.

=== CEV Moto3 Junior World Championship ===
Through Astra Honda Racing Team, Izdihar participated in 2016 FIM CEV Moto3 Junior World Championship. His first season racing in Europe was concluded with ranking 32nd in the standings, as he finished in the points once, a 12th place at Portimao Circuit.

Izdihar was retained by Astra Honda Racing for 2017 FIM CEV Moto3 Junior World Championship, and he finished fifth at the season opener Circuito de Albacete. In overall, Izdihar made it to 17th in the final standings, scoring 29 points during the year. He also raced in AP250 class of Asia Road Racing Championship (ARRC), as a wildcard for Sentul round. He achieved second and third in the two races of the round.

After his place in CEV Moto3 was taken over by Gerry Salim, Izdihar was appointed by Astra Honda Racing to ride Honda CBR600RR in 2018 ARRC, in the Supersport 600 (SS600) class. He scored double victories at Sentul round. The results put him in contention for the championship title as his points were not too far from the leading riders (after Sentul round he ranked 3rd). However, in the last round at Chang International Circuit, he only ranked seventh and eighth, and so finished fifth in the final standings.

Izdihar continued to race in 2019 ARRC SS600 class, with Astra Honda Racing, where he was fifth in the final standings, with two podium finishes at Sepang International Circuit and at The Bend Motorsport Park, both coming in Race 2 of respective rounds.

=== Moto2 World Championship ===
Izdihar was picked by Astra Honda Racing team to race in the majority of the 2019 FIM CEV Moto2 European Championship season. He finished in the top-ten three times, collecting 36 points, and finishing the season in 14th place overall.

Izdihar participated in the 2019 Misano Moto2 race as a replacement for Dimas Ekky, at Idemitsu Honda Team Asia, who was absent due to an injury, and he finished the race in 24th position.

For the 2020 Moto2 season, Izdihar replaced Dimas Ekky permanently, at the Idemitsu Honda Asia Team, where he joined former competitor in Asia Talent Cup Somkiat Chantra. Izdihar did not score any points throughout the season however.

=== Moto3 World Championship ===
Following his poor Moto2 season, Izdihar changed to the 2021 Moto3 World Championship, as he and Ai Ogura switched places at Honda Team Asia between Moto3 and Moto2. Izdihar would come in the points four times throughout the season, scoring a point each in France, Germany, Austria, and Rimini. He finished with four points, and was not renewed for 2022, being replaced by fellow Indonesian rider Mario Aji at the Honda Asia Team.

=== Return to Asia Road Racing ===
Izdihar was signed again by Astra Honda Racing to race in Supersport 600 class in 2022, aboard the new CBR600RR design. He took two victories in both first races of Round 1 (Buriram) and 4 (Sepang). He won the championship and became the first Indonesian rider to achieve that feat.

The following season saw Izdihar promoted to the ASB1000 class with joining Honda Asia Dream Racing. He finished on podium in the second race of the Japan round. At the end of season, he became vice-champion in the championship with just two points behind Yuki Kunii.

In 2025, Izdihar signed with Astra Honda Racing that debuted in ASB1000. He did not participate in the third round of the Asia Road Racing Championship at the Twin Ring Motegi circuit as he was recovering from an injury sustained during the Mandalika Racing Series Round 2 on June. He scored three podium finishes at the second races of Indonesian and Malaysian rounds, and at the first race of the final round at Buriram. At the end of 2025 season, he parted ways with AHRT after 12 years of cooperation.

He joined JDT Racing Team alongside Hafizh Syahrin for the 2026 season, scored a double podium in the first round.

== Personal life ==
Outside his racing duties, Izdihar enjoys billiard, Futsal, and watching movies. Although his full name is Andi Farid Izdihar -which is always registered in all racing series, he competes in on national and international levels- he is known better to Indonesian public as Andi Gilang.

Izdihar is married to a policewoman since 2020.

== Career statistics ==
=== Indoprix ===
==== Races by year ====
(key) (Races in bold indicate pole position; races in italics indicate fastest lap)

Year	Bike	1		2		3		4		5		Pos	Pts
Year	Bike	R1	R2	R1	R2	R1	R2	R1	R2	R1	R2	Pos	Pts
2014	Honda	SIK	SIK	SKY	SKY	SIK	SIK	SKY; DNS	SKY; DNS	BAL; 7	BAL; 7	26th	14

=== Asia Talent Cup ===
==== Races by year ====
(key) (Races in bold indicate pole position; races in italics indicate fastest lap)

Year	Bike	1	2	3		4		5	6		Pos	Pts
Year	Bike	R1	R1	R1	R2	R1	R2	R1	R1	R2	Pos	Pts
2014	Honda	QAT	IDN; DNS	CHN1	CHN2	MAL1	MAL2	JAP	MYS1	MYS2	NC	0

Year	Bike	1	2	3	4	5	6	7	8	9	10	11	12	Pos	Pts
2015	Honda	THA1; Ret	THA2; 4	QAT1; 5	QAT2; 1	MAL1; 11	MAL2; Ret	CHN1; 5	CHN2; 12	JPN1; 7	JPN2; 10	SEP1; 2	SEP2; Ret	9th	104
2016	Honda	THA1; Ret	THA2; 3	QAT1; 5	QAT2; 1	MAL1; 1	MAL2; 3	CHN1; 2	CHN2; 7	JPN1; 5	JPN2; 7	SEP1; 1	SEP2; Ret	3rd	167

=== FIM CEV Moto3 Junior World Championship ===
==== Races by year ====
(key) (Races in bold indicate pole position, races in italics indicate fastest lap)

Year	Bike	1	2	3	4	5	6	7	8	9	10	11	12	Pos	Pts
2016	Honda	VAL1; Ret	VAL2; Ret	LMS; 17	ARA; 19	CAT1; DNS	CAT2; 16	ALB; Ret	ALG; 12	JER1; 25	JER2; 19	VAL1; Ret	VAL2; Ret	32nd	4
2017	Honda	ALB; 5	LMS; DNS	CAT1; Ret	CAT2; 27	VAL1; 7	VAL2; 14	EST; Ret	JER1; 21	JER1; 15	ARA; 10	VAL1; Ret	VAL2; Ret	17th	29

=== FIM CEV Moto2 European Championship ===
==== Races by year ====
(key) (Races in bold indicate pole position, races in italics indicate fastest lap)

Year	Bike	1	2	3	4	5	6	7	8	9	10	11	Pos	Pts
2019	Kalex	EST1	EST2	VAL	CAT1; 12	CAT2; 5	ARA1	ARA2	JER; 8	ALB1; 12	ALB2; 7	VAL; 26	14th	36

=== Grand Prix motorcycle racing ===
==== By season ====
Season	Class	Motorcycle	Team	Number	Race	Win	Podium	Pole	FLap	Pts	Plcd
2019	Moto2	Kalex	IDEMITSU Honda Team Asia	36	1	0	0	0	0	0	NC
2020	Moto2	Kalex	IDEMITSU Honda Team Asia	27	15	0	0	0	0	0	NC
2021	Moto3	Honda	Honda Team Asia	19	16	0	0	0	0	4	29th
Total					**32**	**0**	**0**	**0**	**0**	**4**	

==== By class ====
Class	Seasons	1st GP	1st Pod	1st Win	Race	Win	Podiums	Pole	FLap	Pts	WChmp
Moto2	2019–2020	2019 San Marino			16	0	0	0	0	0	0
Moto3	2021	2021 Qatar			16	0	0	0	0	4	0
Total	2019–2021				**32**	**0**	**0**	**0**	**0**	**4**	**0**

==== Races by year ====
(key) (Races in bold indicate pole position; races in italics indicate fastest lap)

Year	Class	Bike	1	2	3	4	5	6	7	8	9	10	11	12	13	14	15	16	17	18	19	Pos	Pts
2019	Moto2	Kalex	QAT	ARG	AME	SPA	FRA	ITA	CAT	NED	GER	CZE	AUT	GBR	RSM; 24	ARA	THA	JPN	AUS	MAL	VAL	38th	0
2020	Moto2	Kalex	QAT; 22	SPA; 20	ANC; 20	CZE; 25	AUT; Ret	STY; 23	RSM; Ret	EMI; 24	CAT; 19	FRA; Ret	ARA; 22	TER; 21	EUR; 18	VAL; Ret	POR; Ret					30th	0
2021	Moto3	Honda	QAT; 21	DOH; 22	POR; 18	SPA; 18	FRA; 15	ITA; 21	CAT; 17	GER; 15	NED; 24	STY; Ret	AUT; 15	GBR	ARA; 20	RSM; 24	AME; 24	EMI; 15	ALR; 22	VAL; DNS		29th	4

=== ARRC Supersports 600 ===
==== Races by year ====
(key) (Races in bold indicate pole position; races in italics indicate fastest lap)

Year	Bike	1		2		3		4		5		Pos	Pts
Year	Bike	R1	R2	R1	R2	R1	R2	R1	R2	R1	R2	Pos	Pts
2022	Honda	**CHA**; 1	**CHA**; 12	**SEP**; 5	**SEP**; 2	SUG; 2	SUG; 14	**SEP**; 1	**SEP**; 15	CHA; 1	CHA; 1	1st	158

=== ARRC Asia Superbike 1000 Championship ===
==== Races by year ====
(key) (Races in bold indicate pole position; races in italics indicate fastest lap)

Year	Bike	1		2		3		4		5		6		Pos	Pts
Year	Bike	R1	R2	R1	R2	R1	R2	R1	R2	R1	R2	R1	R2	Pos	Pts
2023	Honda	CHA; 5	CHA; 4	SEP; 5	SEP; 4	SUG; 4	SUG; 2	MAN; 2	MAN; C	ZHU; 4	ZHU; 4	**CHA**; 1	**CHA**; 2	2nd	172
2024	Honda	CHA; 2	CHA; 1	ZHU; 2	ZHU; C	MOT; Ret	MOT; 6	MAN; 1	MAN; 3	SEP; 4	SEP; 5	**CHA**; 1	**CHA**; 3	2nd	181
2025	Honda	CHA; 6	CHA; 9	SEP; 6	SEP; 11	MOT	MOT	MAN; 7	MAN; 3	SEP; Ret	SEP; 3	CHA; 2	CHA; 6	6th	103
2026	Ducati	SEP; 3	SEP; 3	CHA; 5	CHA; 6	MOT; 5	MOT; 6	MAN	MAN	SEP	SEP	CHA	CHA	3rd*	74*

=== Mandalika Racing Series ===
==== Races by year ====
(key) (Races in bold indicate pole position; races in italics indicate fastest lap)

Year	Team	Bike	Class	Round 1			Round 2			Round 3			Round 4			Round 5			Pos	Pts
Year	Team	Bike	Class	R1	SP	R2	R1	SP	R2	R1	SP	R2	R1	SP	R2	R1	SP	R2	Pos	Pts
2023	Astra Motor Racing Team - Yogyakarta	Honda	National Sport 150cc	MAN1		MAN2	MAN1		MAN2	MAN1; 1		MAN2; 5							NA	NA
2023	Astra Motor Racing Team - Yogyakarta	Honda	National Sport 250cc	MAN1		MAN2	MAN1		MAN2	MAN1; 3		MAN2; 4							NA	NA
2024	Astra Motor Racing Team - Yogyakarta	Honda	National Sport 150cc	MAN1; 14		MAN2; 1	MAN1; 19		MAN2	MAN1; 6		MAN2; 6	MAN1; Ret		MAN2; 8	MAN1; 7		MAN2; 5	NA	NA
2024	Astra Motor Racing Team - Yogyakarta	Honda	National Sport 250cc	MAN1; 1		MAN2; 1	MAN1		MAN2; 1	MAN1; 1		MAN2; 1	MAN1; 1		MAN2; 1	MAN1; 13		MAN2; 1	NA	NA
2025	Astra Motor Racing Team - Yogyakarta	Honda	National Sport 150cc	MAN1; 7		MAN2; 5	MAN; 8	MAN; DNS	MAN	MAN; 3	MAN; 6	MAN; 3	MAN; Ret		MAN; 2	MAN; 1		MAN; 1	NA	NA
2025	Astra Motor Racing Team - Yogyakarta	Honda	National Sport 250cc	MAN1; 2		MAN2; 5	MAN; 16	MAN; Ret	MAN; DNS	MAN; 3	MAN; Ret	MAN; 2	MAN; 12		MAN; C	MAN; 3		MAN; 3	NA	NA

== Suzuka 8 Hours results ==
Year	Team	Riders	Bike	Pos
2023	(Japan) Honda Asia Dream	(Australia) Troy Herfoss (Malaysia) Zaqhwan Zaidi	Honda CBR1000RR-R SP	7th
