= Gerry Salim =

Indonesian motorcycle racer

- Nationality: Indonesian
- Born: 19 April 1997 (age 29); Surabaya, East Java, Indonesia
- Current team: Honda Asia Dream Racing
- Bike number: 31
Motorcycle racing career statistics
Moto2 World Championship
Active years	2019
Manufacturers	Kalex
2019 championship position	NC (0 pts)
Starts / Wins / Podiums / Poles / F. laps / Points; 1 / 0 / 0 / 0 / 0 / 0
Moto3 World Championship
Active years	2019
Manufacturers	Honda
2019 championship position	NC (0 pts)
Starts / Wins / Podiums / Poles / F. laps / Points; 1 / 0 / 0 / 0 / 0 / 0

Gerry Salim Laurens (born in Surabaya, 19 April 1997), is a motorcycle racer from Indonesia.

== Racing career ==
Gerry started his career in the mid-2000s. In 2011, he won the Motoprix National Championship in the MP6 class. The following year saw him won the Honda One Make Race series in both underbone 110cc and 125cc classes. With him rising through the ranks, Astra Honda Racing Team recruited him to be a part of their rider development program.

=== Asia Road Racing Championship ===
Gerry tried his hands on international racing scene by competing in 2013 Asia Dream Cup. He finished the series as a runner-up. He also raced in GP3 class of All-Japan Championship, ranked fifth, and in Asia Talent Cup for three seasons (2015-2017). He won the 2016 Qatar round. In overall, Gerry ranked sixth in 2015, sixth in 2016 and seventh in 2017.

Gerry was signed to Astra Honda Racing and raced in Supersport 600cc class in Asia Road Racing Championship (ARRC). In 2016, his first season, he won two races in the Indonesian round at Sentul, and ranked ninth in that season. Astra Honda later called him up to race in the lesser class, (AP250) aboard a Honda CBR250RR. Gerry dominated the class with 7 victories out of 12 races in six rounds. He secured the Asian championship at the final round at Chang International Circuit

=== CEV Moto3 Junior World Championship & Red Bull MotoGP Rookies Cup ===
Gerry's success on Asia level paved his way to a higher class, CEV Moto3 Junior World Championship and Red Bull Rookies. In CEV Moto3, he got his first point at Circuito de Albacete and finished his first season in 35th position. Gerry ranked 17th out of 24 riders with 23 points in Red Bull Rookies.

=== Moto2 World Championship ===
In 2019, Gerry was scheduled to race in FIM CEV Moto2 European Championship for Astra Honda Racing Team as a replacement for Dimas Ekky Pratama, who moved up to Moto2 Class. He completed in 2019 Moto2 Aragon GP also as a substitute for Dimas who was injured at Idemitsu Honda Team Asia where he finished 29th.

=== Moto3 World Championship ===
Honda Team Asia called Gerry up to replace their injured regular rider, Ai Ogura, ahead of 2019 Italian motorcycle Grand Prix. Gerry finished the race in 16th position.

=== Return to ARRC ===
Initially, Gerry was recruited by Honda Asia Dream Racing team to race in Asia Superbike (ASB1000) class of ARRC with Malaysian rider Zaqhwan Zaidi as a teammate for 2020 season. However, the season was cancelled due to COVID-19 pandemic. He eventually made his debut in the class in 2022 as the series resumed.

Gerry also raced in 2022 Suzuka 8 Hours for the same team alongside Zaqhwan and Helmi Azman. The trio finished 11th in the race.

== Personal life ==
Gerry comes from a family that has racing background. His father, Gunawan Salim, is a former motorcycle racer and his brother Tommy Salim, also has the same profession as him. Tommy raced in 2018 Suzuka 4 Hours with M. Febriansyah under Astra Honda Racing Team flag and the pair finished 4th.

Gerry is known by his nickname “Si Bonek” and is a fan of Persebaya Surabaya.

== Career statistics ==
=== Asia Talent Cup ===
==== Races by year ====
(key) (Races in bold indicate pole position; races in italics indicate fastest lap)

Year	Bike	1	2	3	4	5	6	7	8	9	10	11	12	Pos	Pts
2015	Honda	THA1; 3	THA2; 7	QAT1; 11	QAT2; 7	MAL1; 8	MAL2; 5	CHN1; 7	CHN2; 5	JPN1; 3	JPN2; 8	SEP1; 9	SEP2; Ret	6th	109
2016	Honda	THA1; 2	THA2; 6	QAT1; 1	QAT2; 3	MAL1; 3	MAL2; Ret	CHN1; 4	CHN2; 2	JPN1; 10	JPN2; 6	SEP1; Ret	SEP2; 7	5th	145
2017	Honda	THA1; 5	THA2; 6	QAT1; NC	QAT2; 8	SUZ1	SUZ2	MAL1; 3	MAL2; 6	JPN1; NC	JPN2; 5	SEP1; 2	SEP2; 8	7th	94

=== Red Bull MotoGP Rookies Cup ===
==== Races by year ====
(key) (Races in bold indicate pole position; races in italics indicate fastest lap)

Year	1	2	3	4	5	6	7	8	9	10	11	12	Pos	Pts
2018	JER1; 23	JER2; 19	MUG; Ret	ASS1; 14	ASS2; 8	SAC1; Ret	SAC2; 15	RBR1; Ret	RBR2; 8	MIS; Ret	ARA1; 17	ARA2; 12	17th	23

=== FIM CEV Moto3 Junior World Championship ===
==== Races by year ====
(key) (Races in bold indicate pole position, races in italics indicate fastest lap)

Year	bike	1	2	3	4	5	6	7	8	9	10	11	12	Pos	Pts
2018	Honda	EST; Ret	VAL1; 25	VAL2; 27	FRA; 25	CAT1; 25	CAT2; 21	ARA; 16	JER1; 17	JER2; 16	ALB; 15	VAL1; 20	VAL2; Ret	35th	1

=== FIM CEV Moto2 European Championship ===
==== Races by year ====
(key) (Races in bold indicate pole position, races in italics indicate fastest lap)

Year	bike	1	2	3	4	5	6	7	8	9	10	11	Pos	Pts
2019	Kalex	EST1; Ret	EST2; 10	VAL; 12	CAT1; 18	CAT2; 10	ARA1	ARA2	JER; 9	ALB1; 13	ALB2; Ret	VAL; DNS	17th	26

=== Grand Prix motorcycle racing ===
==== By season ====
Season	Class	Motorcycle	Team	Race	Win	Podium	Pole	FLap	Pts	Plcd
2019	Moto3	Honda	Honda Team Asia	1	0	0	0	0	0	37th
2019	Moto2	Kalex	IDEMITSU Honda Team Asia	1	0	0	0	0	0	41st
Total				**2**	**0**	**0**	**0**	**0**	**0**	

==== By class ====
Class	Seasons	1st GP	1st Pod	1st Win	Race	Win	Podiums	Pole	FLap	Pts	WChmp
Moto3	2019	2019 Italy			1	0	0	0	0	0	0
Moto2	2019	2019 Aragon			1	0	0	0	0	0	0
Total	2019–Present				**2**	**0**	**0**	**0**	**0**	**0**	**0**

==== Races by year ====
(key) (Races in bold indicate pole position; races in italics indicate fastest lap)

Year	Class	Bike	1	2	3	4	5	6	7	8	9	10	11	12	13	14	15	16	17	18	19	Pos	Pts
2019	Moto3	Honda	QAT	ARG	AME	SPA	FRA	ITA; 16	CAT	NED	GER	CZE	AUT	GBR	RSM	ARA	THA	JPN	AUS	MAL	VAL	37th	0
2019	Moto2	Kalex	QAT	ARG	AME	SPA	FRA	ITA	CAT	NED	GER	CZE	AUT	GBR	RSM	ARA; 29	THA	JPN	AUS	MAL	VAL	41st	0

=== Asia Superbike 1000 ===
==== Races by year ====
(key) (Races in bold indicate pole position; races in italics indicate fastest lap)

Year	Bike	1		2		3		4		5		Pos	Pts
Year	Bike	R1	R2	R1	R2	R1	R2	R1	R2	R1	R2	Pos	Pts
2022	Honda	CHA; 8	CHA; 9	SEP; 7	SEP; 10	SUG; 8	SUG; 11	SEP; 10	SEP; 8	CHA; 7	CHA; 11	10th	71

=== Asia Supersports 600 ===
==== Races by year ====
(key) (Races in bold indicate pole position; races in italics indicate fastest lap)

Year	Bike	1		2		3		4		5		6		Pos	Pts
Year	Bike	R1	R2	R1	R2	R1	R2	R1	R2	R1	R2	R1	R2	Pos	Pts
2023	Honda	CHA; 5	CHA; 13	SEP; 11	SEP; 10	SUG; Ret	SUG; DNS	MAN	MAN	ZHU	ZHU	CHA	CHA	15th	25

=== Asia Production 250 ===
==== Races by year ====
(key) (Races in bold indicate pole position, races in italics indicate fastest lap)

Year	Bike	1		2		3		4		5		6		Pos	Pts
Year	Bike	R1	R2	R1	R2	R1	R2	R1	R2	R1	R2	R1	R2	Pos	Pts
2024	Honda	CHA	CHA	ZHU	ZHU	MOT	MOT	MAN	MAN	SEP; 6	SEP; 7	CHA	CHA	20th	19
2025	Honda	CHA	CHA	SEP	SEP	MOT	MOT	MAN; 11	MAN; 6	SEP	SEP	CHA	CHA	24th	15
2026	Honda	SEP; 2	SEP; 9	CHA; 13	CHA; Ret	MOT; 8	MOT; 11	MAN	MAN	SEP	SEP	CHA	CHA	7th*	43*

* Season still in progress.

=== Mandalika Racing Series ===
==== Races by year ====
(key) (Races in bold indicate pole position; races in italics indicate fastest lap)

Year	Team	Bike	Class	Round 1			Round 2			Round 3			Round 4			Round 5			Pos	Pts
Year	Team	Bike	Class	R1	SP	R2	R1	SP	R2	R1	SP	R2	R1	SP	R2	R1	SP	R2	Pos	Pts
2024	RSeven Racing Tech	Yamaha	Underbone 150cc	MAN1		MAN2	MAN1		MAN2	MAN1		MAN2	MAN1; 8		MAN2; Ret	MAN1		MAN2	NA	NA
2024	Honda GFS MTS Racing Team	Honda	National Sport 250cc	MAN1; 7		MAN2; 7	MAN1; 9		MAN2; 4	MAN2; 10		MAN1; 9	MAN1; 15		MAN2; 8	MAN1; 4		MAN2; 3	NA	NA
2025	MSGLOWFORMEN Racing Team	Honda	National Sport 250cc	MAN1; 8		MAN2; 8	MAN; Ret	MAN; 9	MAN; 6	MAN; 4	MAN; 2	MAN; 21	MAN; 9		MAN; C	MAN; 10		MAN; Ret	NA	NA
