= 2015 Asia Talent Cup =

2015 Asia Talent Cup
Previous:	2014	Next:	2016

The 2015 Shell Advance Asia Talent Cup was the second season of the Asia Talent Cup, a motorcycle racing series organized by Dorna and sponsored by Shell Advance which is intended for young riders throughout Asia and Oceania. The season featured six rounds held at circuits in Asia, with three rounds held in support of the MotoGP World Championship and two rounds in support of the Superbike World Championship. The season commenced at Chang on 20 March, and concluded at Sepang on 23 October.

Japanese rider Ayumu Sasaki won the championship in his second season in the series ahead of compatriots Takuma Kunimine and Kazuki Masaki. This season also featured the debut of Ai Ogura, who would go on to become the first Asia Talent Cup graduate to win a Grand Prix motorcycle racing World Championship upon winning the 2024 Moto2 World Championship.

== Entry list ==
No.	Rider	Rounds
2	(Japan) Kazuki Masaki	All
3	(Malaysia) Shafiq Rasol	All
4	(Indonesia) Gerry Salim	All
5	(Philippines) Mckinley Kyle Paz	1–2
5	(Malaysia) Luth Harith Erwan	3–4
6	(Japan) Yūta Date	All
7	(Thailand) Sittipon Srimoontree	All
8	(Australia) Tom Edwards	1–2
8	(Malaysia) Idham Khairuddin	3–6
9	(Japan) Ai Ogura	All
10	(Malaysia) Adam Norrodin	All
11	(Malaysia) Muhammad Helmi Azman	All
12	(Japan) Ryūsei Yamanaka	All
13	(Thailand) Nakarin Atiratphuvapat	All
14	(China) Zhou Shengjunjie	4–6
16	(China) Chen Pengyuan	1–3
15	(Japan) Kite Fuse	All
16	(Australia) Lachlan Taylor	1, 3
16	(Japan) Yūto Fukushima	5–6
17	(Malaysia) Fakhrusy Syakirin Rostam	All
18	(Thailand) Somkiat Chantra	1–2
18	(Australia) Matt Barton	6
19	(China) Chen Yuanhang	All
20	(Malaysia) Azroy Hakeem Anuar	All
21	(Japan) Takuma Kunimine	All
22	(Japan) Ayumu Sasaki	All
23	(Indonesia) Andi Farid Izdihar	All

== Results and standings ==
Rnd.		Circuit	Date	Pole position	Winning rider
1	1	(Thailand) Chang International Circuit, Buriram	21 March	(Malaysia) Muhammad Helmi Azman	(Thailand) Somkiat Chantra
1	2	(Thailand) Chang International Circuit, Buriram	22 March		(Thailand) Nakarin Atiratphuvapat
2	3	(Qatar) Losail International Circuit, Losail	28 March	(Thailand) Nakarin Atiratphuvapat	(Japan) Takuma Kunimine
2	4	(Qatar) Losail International Circuit, Losail	29 March		(Indonesia) Andi Farid Izdihar
3	5	(Malaysia) Sepang International Circuit, Sepang	1 August	(Japan) Ayumu Sasaki	(Japan) Ayumu Sasaki
3	6	(Malaysia) Sepang International Circuit, Sepang	2 August		(Thailand) Nakarin Atiratphuvapat
4	7	(China) Zhuhai International Circuit, Zhuhai	19 September	(Malaysia) Adam Norrodin	(Japan) Ayumu Sasaki
4	8	(China) Zhuhai International Circuit, Zhuhai	20 September		(Japan) Ai Ogura
5	9	(Japan) Twin Ring Motegi, Motegi	10 October	(Japan) Ayumu Sasaki	(Japan) Ayumu Sasaki
5	10	(Japan) Twin Ring Motegi, Motegi	11 October		(Japan) Kazuki Masaki
6	11	(Malaysia) Sepang International Circuit, Sepang	24 October	(Japan) Takuma Kunimine	(Japan) Takuma Kunimine
6	12	(Malaysia) Sepang International Circuit, Sepang	25 October		(Japan) Kazuki Masaki

== Riders' championship ==
Scoring System

Points are awarded to the top fifteen finishers. A rider has to finish the race to earn points.

Position	1st	2nd	3rd	4th	5th	6th	7th	8th	9th	10th	11th	12th	13th	14th	15th
Points	25	20	16	13	11	10	9	8	7	6	5	4	3	2	1

Pos.	Rider	THA (Thailand)		QAT (Qatar)		MAL1 (Malaysia)		CHN (China)		JPN (Japan)		MAL2 (Malaysia)		Pts
Pos.	Rider	R1	R2	R1	R2	R1	R2	R1	R2	R1	R2	R1	R2	Pts
1	(Japan) Ayumu Sasaki	2	2	3	2	1	Ret	1	6	1	2	4	7	203
2	(Japan) Takuma Kunimine	7	5	1	Ret	4	2	4	3	6	Ret	1	2	162
3	(Japan) Kazuki Masaki	4	3	4	7	3	12	Ret	2	18	1	6	1	152
4	(Thailand) Nakarin Atiratphuvapat	5	1	6	3	5	1	9	Ret	5	11	10	4	124
5	(Japan) Yūta Date	12	11	7	11	12	4	3	11	11	3	3	5	110
6	(Indonesia) Gerry Salim	3	7	11	8	8	5	7	5	3	8	9	Ret	109
7	(Japan) Ai Ogura	10	Ret	12	14	6	Ret	2	1	2	4	Ret	10	107
8	(Malaysia) Adam Norrodin	6	14	13	6	2	Ret	11	4	4	13	7	3	105
9	(Indonesia) Andi Farid Izdihar	Ret	4	5	1	11	Ret	5	12	7	10	2	Ret	104
10	(Malaysia) Muhammad Helmi Azman	8	6	Ret	5	13	7	8	8	10	12	11	8	82
11	(Malaysia) Fakhrusy Syakirin Rostam	Ret	9	Ret	9	7	3	10	10	8	6	5	Ret	81
12	(Thailand) Somkiat Chantra	1	Ret	2	4									61
13	(Malaysia) Shafiq Rasol	9	8	8	10	10	6	DNS	WD	17	15	12	6	61
14	(Malaysia) Azroy Hakeem Anuar	14	12	9	13	14	Ret	Ret	9	9	5	8	9	59
15	(Japan) Ryūsei Yamanaka	Ret	15	15	16	9	Ret	6	7	Ret	9	13	11	44
16	(Japan) Kite Fuse	11	10	10	12	15	Ret	12	13	Ret	7	15	Ret	40
17	(Malaysia) Idham Khairuddin					19	9	13	16	14	18	14	13	17
18	(Thailand) Sittipon Srimoontree	15	17	16	17	17	8	15	15	16	Ret	17	12	15
19	(China) Chen Yuanhang	13	13	14	15	16	Ret	Ret	17	15	16	18	14	13
20	(China) Zhou Shengjunjie							14	14	13	14	16	15	10
21	(Australia) Lachlan Taylor	17	Ret			21	10							6
22	(Malaysia) Luth Harith Erwan					20	11	16	18			20	16	5
23	(Japan) Yūto Fukushima									12	17	19	17	4
—	(China) Chen Pengyuan	16	16	Ret	18	18	Ret							0
—	(Australia) Tom Edwards	18	18	17	19									0
—	(Australia) Matt Barton											21	18	0
—	(Philippines) Mckinley Kyle Paz	Ret	19	Ret	Ret									0
Pos.	Rider	R1	R2	R1	R2	R1	R2	R1	R2	R1	R2	R1	R2	Pts
Pos.	Rider	THA (Thailand)		QAT (Qatar)		MAL1 (Malaysia)		CHN (China)		JPN (Japan)		MAL2 (Malaysia)		Pts
