= Kazuki Masaki =

Japanese motorcycle racer

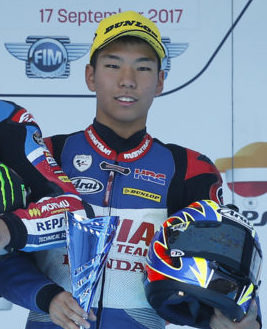
- Masaki in 2017
- Nationality: Japanese
- Born: 22 August 2000 (age 26); Fukuoka, Japan
Motorcycle racing career statistics
Moto3 World Championship
Active years	2017–2019
Manufacturers	Honda, KTM
Championships	0
2019 championship position	27th (14 pts)
Starts / Wins / Podiums / Poles / F. laps / Points; 37 / 0 / 0 / 0 / 0 / 29

Kazuki Masaki (真崎 一輝, Masaki Kazuki; born 22 August 2000) is a Japanese former motorcycle racer.

== Career ==
Masaki won the 2017 Red Bull MotoGP Rookies Cup and made his Moto3 World Championship debut as a wildcard during the 2017 Valencia GP, where he finished tenth.

Masaki joined Moto3 as a full-time rider in 2018 switching from Honda's Asia Talent Team to KTM's RBA Boé Skull Rider.

After two unsuccessful seasons in Moto3, Masaki stepped down to FIM CEV Moto3 Junior World Championship in 2020.

== Career statistics ==
=== Asia Talent Cup ===
==== Races by year ====
(key) (Races in bold indicate pole position; races in italics indicate fastest lap)

Year	Bike	1	2	3	4	5	6	7	8	9	10	11	12	Pos	Pts
2015	Honda	THA1; 4	THA2; 3	QAT1; 4	QAT2; 6	MAL1; 3	MAL2; 12	CHN1; Ret	CHN2; 2	JPN1; Ret	JPN2; 1	SEP1; 6	SEP2; 1	3rd	152
2016	Honda	THA1; 5	THA2; 5	QAT1; 3	QAT2; 4	MAL1; 6	MAL2; 12	CHN1; Ret	CHN2; 4	JPN1; 3	JPN2; 2	SEP1; 3	SEP2; Ret	7th	134

=== FIM CEV Moto3 Junior World Championship ===
==== Races by year ====
(key) (Races in bold indicate pole position, races in italics indicate fastest lap)

Year	Bike	1	2	3	4	5	6	7	8	9	10	11	12	Pos	Pts
2016	Honda	VAL1; 12	VAL2; 7	LMS; 8	ARA; 10	CAT1; 7	CAT2; 5	ALB; 8	ALG; 17	JER1; 5	JER2; 14	VAL1; Ret	VAL2; 12	10th	72
2017	Honda	ALB; Ret	LMS; 24	CAT1; 4	CAT2; 4	VAL1; 5	VAL2; 6	EST; 2	JER1; 3	JER1; Ret	ARA; 3	VAL1; 6	VAL2; 27	6th	109
2020	Husqvarna	EST; 10	POR; Ret	JER1; Ret	JER2; 6	JER3; 5	ARA1; 8	ARA2; 8	ARA3; 8	VAL1; 16	VAL2; 15	VAL3; 15		9th	53

=== Red Bull MotoGP Rookies Cup ===
==== Races by year ====
(key) (Races in bold indicate pole position, races in italics indicate fastest lap)

Year	1	2	3	4	5	6	7	8	9	10	11	12	13	Pos	Pts
2017	JER1; 3	JER2; 5	ASS1; 2	ASS2; 3	SAC1; 10	SAC2; 3	**BRN1**; 3	**BRN2**; 13	RBR1; 2	RBR2; 1	MIS; 2	ARA1; 1	ARA2; 21	1st	194

=== Grand Prix motorcycle racing ===
==== By season ====
Season	Class	Motorcycle	Team	Race	Win	Podium	Pole	FLap	Pts	Plcd
2017	Moto3	Honda	Asia Talent Team	1	0	0	0	0	6	31st
2018	Moto3	KTM	RBA Boé Skull Rider	17	0	0	0	0	9	31st
2019	Moto3	KTM	Boé Skull Rider Mugen Race	19	0	0	0	0	14	27th
Total				**37**	**0**	**0**	**0**	**0**	**29**	

==== Races by year ====
(key) (Races in bold indicate pole position, races in italics indicate fastest lap)

Year	Class	Bike	1	2	3	4	5	6	7	8	9	10	11	12	13	14	15	16	17	18	19	Pos	Pts
2017	Moto3	Honda	QAT	ARG	AME	SPA	FRA	ITA	CAT	NED	GER	CZE	AUT	GBR	RSM	ARA	JPN	AUS	MAL	VAL; 10		31st	6
2018	Moto3	KTM	QAT; 13	ARG; 20	AME; 22	SPA; 20	FRA; 18	ITA; 22	CAT; Ret	NED; 20	GER; 15	CZE; 13	AUT; 21	GBR; C	RSM; 15	ARA; 21	THA; 20	JPN; 22	AUS; DNS	MAL; 15	VAL; 16	31st	9
2019	Moto3	KTM	QAT; 19	ARG; 23	AME; 16	SPA; 13	FRA; 8	ITA; Ret	CAT; 16	NED; 13	GER; 17	CZE; Ret	AUT; 24	GBR; 26	RSM; Ret	ARA; 25	THA; 18	JPN; 20	AUS; 17	MAL; 18	VAL; 16	27th	14

Sporting positions
Preceded by Ayumu Sasaki	Red Bull MotoGP Rookies Cup champion 2017	Succeeded by Can Öncü
