= 2018 Moto3 World Championship =

7th running of the Moto3 World Championship

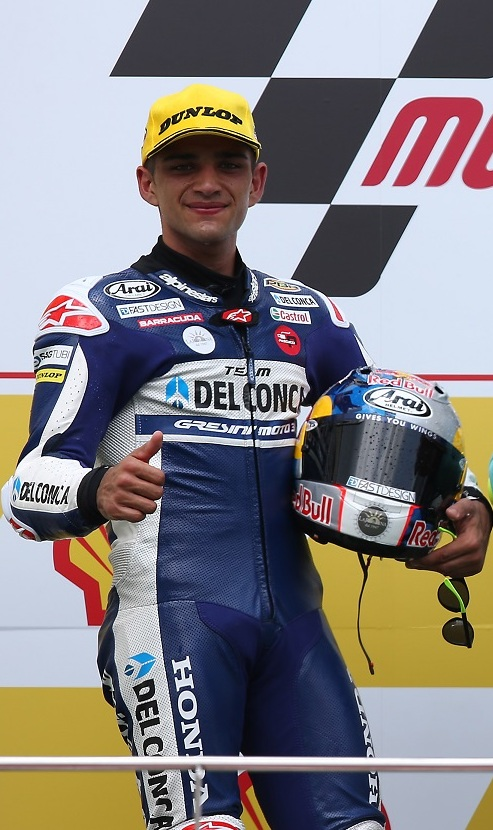
Jorge Martín (pictured in 2017) was the 2018 Moto3 World Riders' Champion.

The 2018 FIM Moto3 World Championship was the lightweight class of the 70th Fédération Internationale de Motocyclisme (FIM) Road Racing World Championship season. Joan Mir was the reigning series champion, but he did not defend his title as he joined Moto2.

After winning at Sepang, Spanish rider Jorge Martín was crowned the 2018 Moto3 World Champion, having created an unassailable lead of 26 points over current runner-up Marco Bezzecchi.

The final race in Valencia saw wildcard rider Can Öncü become the youngest Grand Prix motorcycle racing winner at 15 years, 115 days.

== Teams and riders ==
Team	Constructor	Motorcycle	No.	Rider	Rounds
AP Honda Racing Thailand	Honda	NSF250RW	35	(Thailand) Somkiat Chantra	15
(Italy) Del Conca Gresini Moto3	Honda	NSF250RW	21	(Italy) Fabio Di Giannantonio	All
(Italy) Del Conca Gresini Moto3	Honda	NSF250RW	88	(Spain) Jorge Martín	All
(Spain) Estrella Galicia 0,0 (Spain) Junior Team Estrella Galicia 0,0	Honda	NSF250RW	44	(Spain) Arón Canet	1–14, 16–19
(Spain) Estrella Galicia 0,0 (Spain) Junior Team Estrella Galicia 0,0	Honda	NSF250RW	52	(Spain) Jeremy Alcoba	15
(Spain) Estrella Galicia 0,0 (Spain) Junior Team Estrella Galicia 0,0	Honda	NSF250RW	72	(Spain) Alonso López	All
(Spain) Estrella Galicia 0,0 (Spain) Junior Team Estrella Galicia 0,0	Honda	NSF250RW	52	(Spain) Jeremy Alcoba	4, 14
(Japan) Honda Team Asia (Japan) Asia Talent Team	Honda	NSF250RW	27	(Japan) Kaito Toba	All
(Japan) Honda Team Asia (Japan) Asia Talent Team	Honda	NSF250RW	41	(Thailand) Nakarin Atiratphuvapat	All
(Japan) Honda Team Asia (Japan) Asia Talent Team	Honda	NSF250RW	32	(Japan) Ai Ogura	4, 8–9, 11
(Japan) Kohara Racing Team	Honda	NSF250RW	13	(Japan) Shizuka Okazaki	16
(Luxembourg) Leopard Racing	Honda	NSF250RW	33	(Italy) Enea Bastianini	All
(Luxembourg) Leopard Racing	Honda	NSF250RW	48	(Italy) Lorenzo Dalla Porta	All
(Luxembourg) Leopard Racing	Honda	NSF250RW	96	(Italy) Manuel Pagliani	6
(Luxembourg) Leopard Racing	Honda	NSF250RW	69	(United Kingdom) Tom Booth-Amos	12
(Italy) Marinelli Snipers Team	Honda	NSF250RW	14	(Italy) Tony Arbolino	All
(Italy) Marinelli Snipers Team	Honda	NSF250RW	76	(Kazakhstan) Makar Yurchenko	18
(Malaysia) Petronas Sprinta Racing	Honda	NSF250RW	7	(Malaysia) Adam Norrodin	1–18
(Malaysia) Petronas Sprinta Racing	Honda	NSF250RW	26	(Malaysia) Izam Ikmal	19
(Malaysia) Petronas Sprinta Racing	Honda	NSF250RW	71	(Japan) Ayumu Sasaki	1–13, 15–19
(Italy) Sic58 Squadra Corse	Honda	NSF250RW	23	(Italy) Niccolò Antonelli	1–16, 18–19
(Italy) Sic58 Squadra Corse	Honda	NSF250RW	55	(Italy) Yari Montella	17
(Italy) Sic58 Squadra Corse	Honda	NSF250RW	24	(Japan) Tatsuki Suzuki	All
(Italy) Sic58 Squadra Corse	Honda	NSF250RW	55	(Italy) Yari Montella	13
(Japan) Team Plus One	Honda	NSF250RW	36	(Japan) Yuto Fukushima	16
(Spain) Ángel Nieto Team Moto3	KTM	RC250GP	16	(Italy) Andrea Migno	All
(Spain) Ángel Nieto Team Moto3	KTM	RC250GP	75	(Spain) Albert Arenas	All
(Spain) Ángel Nieto Team Moto3	KTM	RC250GP	25	(Spain) Raúl Fernández	7, 14, 19
(United Arab Emirates) Bester Capital Dubai	KTM	RC250GP	5	(Spain) Jaume Masiá	1–17, 19
(United Arab Emirates) Bester Capital Dubai	KTM	RC250GP	42	(Spain) Marcos Ramírez	All
(France) CIP - Green Power	KTM	RC250GP	17	(United Kingdom) John McPhee	All
(France) CIP - Green Power	KTM	RC250GP	76	(Kazakhstan) Makar Yurchenko	1–7
(France) CIP - Green Power	KTM	RC250GP	81	(Italy) Stefano Nepa	8–19
(United Kingdom) City Lifting RS Racing	KTM	RC250GP	20	(United Kingdom) Jake Archer	12
(Spain) Cuna de Campeones Czech Talent Team	KTM	RC250GP	15	(Czech Republic) Filip Salač	10
(Germany) Freudenberg Racing Team	KTM	RC250GP	43	(Germany) Luca Grünwald	9
(Netherlands) Lamotec Lagemaat Racing	KTM	RC250GP	18	(Netherlands) Ryan van de Lagemaat	8
(Austria) Motorsport Kofler	KTM	RC250GP	73	(Austria) Maximilian Kofler	11
(Italy) NRT Junior Team	KTM	RC250GP	81	(Italy) Stefano Nepa	6
(Spain) RBA Boé Skull Rider	KTM	RC250GP	19	(Argentina) Gabriel Rodrigo	1–17, 19
(Spain) RBA Boé Skull Rider	KTM	RC250GP	22	(Japan) Kazuki Masaki	All
(Spain) Reale Avintia Academy (Spain) Reale Avintia Academy 77	KTM	RC250GP	11	(Belgium) Livio Loi	1–8
(Spain) Reale Avintia Academy (Spain) Reale Avintia Academy 77	KTM	RC250GP	77	(Spain) Vicente Pérez	9–19
(Spain) Reale Avintia Academy (Spain) Reale Avintia Academy 77	KTM	RC250GP	77	(Spain) Vicente Pérez	7
(Finland) Red Bull KTM Ajo	KTM	RC250GP	40	(South Africa) Darryn Binder	1–8, 10–19
(Finland) Red Bull KTM Ajo	KTM	RC250GP	25	(Spain) Raúl Fernández	9
(Finland) Red Bull KTM Ajo	KTM	RC250GP	61	(Turkey) Can Öncü	19
(Germany) Redox PrüstelGP	KTM	RC250GP	12	(Italy) Marco Bezzecchi	All
(Germany) Redox PrüstelGP	KTM	RC250GP	84	(Czech Republic) Jakub Kornfeil	All
(Italy) Sky Racing Team VR46 (Italy) VR46 Master Camp Team	KTM	RC250GP	8	(Italy) Nicolò Bulega	1–15
(Italy) Sky Racing Team VR46 (Italy) VR46 Master Camp Team	KTM	RC250GP	31	(Italy) Celestino Vietti	16–19
(Italy) Sky Racing Team VR46 (Italy) VR46 Master Camp Team	KTM	RC250GP	10	(Italy) Dennis Foggia	All
(Italy) Sky Racing Team VR46 (Italy) VR46 Master Camp Team	KTM	RC250GP	9	(Thailand) Apiwat Wongthananon	15, 18
(Germany) Südmetal Schedl GP Racing	KTM	RC250GP	65	(Germany) Philipp Öttl	All
(Italy) TM Racing Factory 3570 MTA	TM Racing	TM Racing	3	(Italy) Kevin Zannoni	13

Key
Regular rider
Replacement rider
Wildcard rider

All the bikes used series-specified Dunlop tyres.

=== Team changes ===
- Mahindra and Peugeot withdrew from the Championship after the 2017 season. Ángel Nieto Team, Redox PrüstelGP, and CIP - Green Power switched to KTM as a result of their withdrawal.
- AGR Team folded its operations in both Moto2 and Moto3 following the 2017 Aragon GP due to financial issues coupled with poor performance throughout the 2017 season.
- British Talent Team's Moto3 team put in a temporary hiatus for the next few years starting from 2018.
- Marinelli Snipers have downsized to one bike in exchange for one slot in Moto2.
- Avintia Racing returned to Moto3 after a five-season hiatus. They joined forces with Team Stylobike to form Reale Stylobike, fielding a KTM for Livio Loi.
- Red Bull KTM Ajo also downsized to one bike.

=== Rider changes ===
- Enea Bastianini moved to Leopard Racing, filling in the seat vacated by Joan Mir who moves up to Moto2, with Alonso López replacing Bastianini in Estrella Galicia 0,0.
- Sky VR46 rider Andrea Migno rode for Ángel Nieto Team, replacing Lorenzo Dalla Porta.
- Dennis Foggia made his full season debut in Moto3 with Sky Racing Team VR46, having previously competed as a replacement and wildcard rider in the 2017 season.
- Jaume Masiá made his full season debut at Moto3 with Bester Capital Dubai after previously competing as a replacement rider for the team in the 2017 season.
- Marco Bezzecchi moved from CIP to Redox PrüstelGP, replacing Patrik Pulkkinen.
- Niccolò Antonelli moved from Red Bull KTM Ajo to Sic58 Squadra Corse.
- After his full season debut with Sic58 Squadra Corse, Tony Arbolino moved to Marinelli Rivacold Snipers.
- Darryn Binder rode for Red Bull KTM Ajo, replacing Bo Bendsneyder who graduated to Moto2 with Tech 3.
- Lorenzo Dalla Porta raced with Leopard Racing, replacing Livio Loi, who moved to Reale Avintia Academy.
- Makar Yurchenko made his Moto3 debut with CIP, replacing Manuel Pagliani.
- Both Romano Fenati and Jules Danilo moved up to Moto2, joining Marinelli Rivacold Snipers and SAG Team respectively.
- John McPhee joined the CIP team as British Talent Team hiatus.
- María Herrera left Moto3 for the Supersport 300 World Championship.
- Juan Francisco Guevara didn't continue with the RBA Boé Racing Team after he announced his retirement from professional racing for personal reasons. He replaced by the 2017 Red Bull Rookies Cup champion Kazuki Masaki.

==== Mid-season changes ====
- Makar Yurchenko left the CIP - Green Power after his contract was terminated by mutual agreement due to inconsistent race results. He was replaced by Stefano Nepa from Dutch TT onwards to join CIP - Green Power for the remainder of the season.
- Reale Avintia Academy expanded to enter a second bike, which will be ridden by Vicente Pérez. Reale Avintia raced under the name of "Reale Avintia Academy 77" from Catalan motorcycle Grand Prix onwards in honor of the late Andreas Pérez. Livio Loi left the Reale Avintia midway through the season due to inconsistent race results, managing only 8 points over 8 races. He will be replaced by Vicente for the remainder of the season.
- Darryn Binder missed the German motorcycle Grand Prix due to injury, he was replaced by the Spaniard Raúl Fernández.
- Arón Canet missed the Thailand motorcycle Grand Prix due to injury, he was replaced by Jeremy Alcoba.

== Calendar ==
The following Grands Prix were scheduled to take place in 2018:

Round	Date	Grand Prix	Circuit
1	18 March (Note: Night race)	Grand Prix of Qatar	Lusail International Circuit, Lusail
2	8 April	Gran Premio Motul de la República Argentina	Autódromo Termas de Río Hondo, Termas de Río Hondo
3	22 April	(United States) Red Bull Grand Prix of the Americas	Circuit of the Americas, Austin
4	6 May	(Spain) Gran Premio Red Bull de España	Circuito de Jerez, Jerez de la Frontera
5	20 May	HJC Helmets Grand Prix de France	Bugatti Circuit, Le Mans
6	3 June	(Italy) Gran Premio d'Italia Oakley	Mugello Circuit, Scarperia e San Piero
7	17 June	(Catalonia) Gran Premi Monster Energy de Catalunya	Circuit de Barcelona-Catalunya, Montmeló
8	1 July	(Netherlands) Motul TT Assen	TT Circuit Assen, Assen
9	15 July	(Germany) Pramac Motorrad Grand Prix Deutschland	Sachsenring, Hohenstein-Ernstthal
10	5 August	(Czech Republic) Monster Energy Grand Prix České republiky	Brno Circuit, Brno
11	12 August	(Austria) Eyetime Motorrad Grand Prix von Österreich	Red Bull Ring, Spielberg
12	26 August	(United Kingdom) GoPro British Grand Prix	Silverstone Circuit, Silverstone
13	9 September	Gran Premio Octo di San Marino e della Riviera di Rimini	Misano World Circuit, Misano Adriatico
14	23 September	(Aragon) Gran Premio Movistar de Aragón	MotorLand Aragón, Alcañiz
15	7 October	PTT Thailand Grand Prix	Buriram International Circuit, Buriram
16	21 October	Motul Grand Prix of Japan	Motegi Circuit, Motegi
17	28 October	(Australia) Michelin Australian Motorcycle Grand Prix	Phillip Island Grand Prix Circuit, Phillip Island
18	4 November	Shell Malaysia Motorcycle Grand Prix	Sepang International Circuit, Sepang
19	18 November	(Valencian Community) Gran Premio Motul de la Comunitat Valenciana	Circuit Ricardo Tormo, Valencia

=== Calendar changes ===
Comparison between the configuration of the Circuit de Barcelona-Catalunya used in 2016 and 2017 (top), and the layout used starting 2018 (bottom).
- The British Grand Prix was scheduled to move from Silverstone to the new Circuit of Wales, but construction on the new track has not commenced. The two circuits reached a deal that will see Silverstone with an option to host the 2018 race.
- The Thailand Grand Prix is a new addition to the calendar, with the race scheduled for 7 October.
- The Catalan Grand Prix used a new configuration of the Circuit de Barcelona-Catalunya, wherein the previous set of corners of turns 13, 14 and 15 was combined into a sweeping right corner. The new layout was previously used in Formula 1 from 2004 to 2006.

== Results and standings ==
=== Grands Prix ===
Round	Grand Prix	Pole position	Fastest lap	Winning rider	Winning team	Winning constructor	Report
1	Qatar motorcycle Grand Prix	(Italy) Niccolò Antonelli	(Spain) Arón Canet	(Spain) Jorge Martín	(Italy) Del Conca Gresini Moto3	(Japan) Honda	Report
2	(Argentina) Argentine Republic motorcycle Grand Prix	(Italy) Tony Arbolino	(Spain) Jorge Martín	(Italy) Marco Bezzecchi	(Germany) Redox PrüstelGP	(Austria) KTM	Report
3	(United States) Motorcycle Grand Prix of the Americas	(Spain) Jorge Martín	(Italy) Enea Bastianini	(Spain) Jorge Martín	(Italy) Del Conca Gresini Moto3	(Japan) Honda	Report
4	(Spain) Spanish motorcycle Grand Prix	(Spain) Jorge Martín	(Spain) Alonso López	(Germany) Philipp Öttl	(Germany) Südmetal Schedl GP Racing	(Austria) KTM	Report
5	(France) French motorcycle Grand Prix	(Spain) Jorge Martín	(Spain) Jorge Martín	(Spain) Albert Arenas	(Spain) Ángel Nieto Team Moto3	(Austria) KTM	Report
6	(Italy) Italian motorcycle Grand Prix	(Spain) Jorge Martín	(Italy) Fabio Di Giannantonio	(Spain) Jorge Martín	(Italy) Del Conca Gresini Moto3	(Japan) Honda	Report
7	(Catalonia) Catalan motorcycle Grand Prix	(Italy) Enea Bastianini	(Spain) Jaume Masiá	(Italy) Enea Bastianini	(Luxembourg) Leopard Racing	(Japan) Honda	Report
8	(Netherlands) Dutch TT	(Spain) Jorge Martín	(Spain) Arón Canet	(Spain) Jorge Martín	(Italy) Del Conca Gresini Moto3	(Japan) Honda	Report
9	(Germany) German motorcycle Grand Prix	(Spain) Jorge Martín	(Spain) Arón Canet	(Spain) Jorge Martín	(Italy) Del Conca Gresini Moto3	(Japan) Honda	Report
10	Czech Republic motorcycle Grand Prix	(Czech Republic) Jakub Kornfeil	(Spain) Arón Canet	(Italy) Fabio Di Giannantonio	(Italy) Del Conca Gresini Moto3	(Japan) Honda	Report
11	(Austria) Austrian motorcycle Grand Prix	(Italy) Marco Bezzecchi	(Italy) Lorenzo Dalla Porta	(Italy) Marco Bezzecchi	(Germany) Redox PrüstelGP	(Austria) KTM	Report
12	(United Kingdom) British motorcycle Grand Prix	(Spain) Jorge Martín	Race cancelled (Note: All racing at Silverstone was cancelled due to sustained heavy rain and unsafe track conditions.)				Report
13	San Marino and Rimini Riviera motorcycle Grand Prix	(Spain) Jorge Martín	(Argentina) Gabriel Rodrigo	(Italy) Lorenzo Dalla Porta	(Luxembourg) Leopard Racing	(Japan) Honda	Report
14	Aragon motorcycle Grand Prix	(Spain) Jorge Martín	(Spain) Jaume Masiá	(Spain) Jorge Martín	(Italy) Del Conca Gresini Moto3	(Japan) Honda	Report
15	Thailand motorcycle Grand Prix	(Italy) Marco Bezzecchi	(Italy) Dennis Foggia	(Italy) Fabio Di Giannantonio	(Italy) Del Conca Gresini Moto3	(Japan) Honda	Report
16	(Japan) Japanese motorcycle Grand Prix	(Argentina) Gabriel Rodrigo	(South Africa) Darryn Binder	(Italy) Marco Bezzecchi	(Germany) Redox PrüstelGP	(Austria) KTM	Report
17	(Australia) Australian motorcycle Grand Prix	(Spain) Jorge Martín	(Italy) Lorenzo Dalla Porta	(Spain) Albert Arenas	(Spain) Ángel Nieto Team Moto3	(Austria) KTM	Report
18	(Malaysia) Malaysian motorcycle Grand Prix	(Spain) Jorge Martín	(Spain) Jorge Martín	(Spain) Jorge Martín	(Italy) Del Conca Gresini Moto3	(Japan) Honda	Report
19	Valencian Community motorcycle Grand Prix	(Italy) Tony Arbolino	(Italy) Tony Arbolino	(Turkey) Can Öncü	(Finland) Red Bull KTM Ajo	(Austria) KTM	Report

=== Riders' standings ===
Scoring system

Points were awarded to the top fifteen finishers. A rider had to finish the race to earn points.

Position	1st	2nd	3rd	4th	5th	6th	7th	8th	9th	10th	11th	12th	13th	14th	15th
Points	25	20	16	13	11	10	9	8	7	6	5	4	3	2	1

Pos.	Rider	Bike	Team	QAT (Qatar)	ARG (Argentina)	AME (United States)	SPA (Spain)	FRA (France)	ITA (Italy)	CAT (Catalonia)	NED (Netherlands)	GER (Germany)	CZE (Czech Republic)	AUT (Austria)	GBR (United Kingdom)	RSM (San Marino)	ARA (Aragon)	THA (Thailand)	JPN (Japan)	AUS (Australia)	MAL (Malaysia)	VAL (Valencian Community)	Pts
1	(Spain) Jorge Martín	Honda	Del Conca Gresini Moto3	1	11^{F}	1^{P}	Ret^{P}	Ret^{P F}	1^{P}	Ret	1^{P}	1^{P}	DNS	3	C^{P}	2^{P}	1^{P}	4	Ret	5^{P}	1^{P F}	2	260
2	(Italy) Fabio Di Giannantonio	Honda	Del Conca Gresini Moto3	6	3	5	7	4	3^{F}	7	9	Ret	1	11	C	3	4	1	Ret	2	6	4	218
3	(Italy) Marco Bezzecchi	KTM	Redox PrüstelGP	14	1	3	2	Ret	2	2	Ret	2	6	1^{P}	C	Ret	2	NC^{P}	1	Ret	5	20	214
4	(Italy) Enea Bastianini	Honda	Leopard Racing	Ret	4	2^{F}	Ret	Ret	6	1^{P}	3	Ret	4	2	C	Ret	3	Ret	7	8	3	5	177
5	(Italy) Lorenzo Dalla Porta	Honda	Leopard Racing	3	7	18	Ret	Ret	8	17	6	13	10	5^{F}	C	1	13	2	2	Ret^{F}	2	18	151
6	(Spain) Arón Canet	Honda	Estrella Galicia 0,0	2^{F}	2	8	Ret	8	11	Ret	2^{F}	5^{F}	2^{F}	10	C	Ret	Ret		Ret	6	Ret	Ret	128
7	(Argentina) Gabriel Rodrigo	KTM	RBA Boé Skull Rider	5	9	12	10	Ret	4	3	8	Ret	5	8	C	4^{F}	Ret	5	8^{P}	Ret		17	116
8	(Czech Republic) Jakub Kornfeil	KTM	Redox PrüstelGP	9	14	7	8	6	23	11	5	7	3^{P}	13	C	5	11	10	10	9	20	15	116
9	(Spain) Albert Arenas	KTM	Ángel Nieto Team Moto3	DNS	Ret	15	Ret	1	14	Ret	14	Ret	9	4	C	6	7	Ret	Ret	1	4	Ret	107
10	(Spain) Marcos Ramírez	KTM	Bester Capital Dubai	15	12	Ret	3	3	15	Ret	10	4	7	15	C	16	5	8	12	Ret	11	9	102
11	(Italy) Andrea Migno	KTM	Ángel Nieto Team Moto3	10	13	4	13	2	5	Ret	26	12	20	Ret	C	9	12	11	13	13	16	14	84
12	(United Kingdom) John McPhee	KTM	CIP - Green Power	Ret	17	14	Ret	12	12	4	Ret	3	Ret	12	C	Ret	10	Ret	5	14	Ret	3	78
13	(Spain) Jaume Masiá	KTM	Bester Capital Dubai	12	Ret	21	5	10	Ret	Ret^{F}	4	6	17	6	C	Ret	9^{F}	17	11	Ret		6	76
14	(Japan) Tatsuki Suzuki	Honda	Sic58 Squadra Corse	DNS	21	9	6	9	17	5	13	Ret	14	18	C	Ret	6	Ret	15	4	9	Ret	71
15	(Italy) Niccolò Antonelli	Honda	Sic58 Squadra Corse	4^{P}	8	24	11	5	9	DNS	15	16	11	22	C	10	Ret	Ret	Ret		10	7	71
16	(Germany) Philipp Öttl	KTM	Südmetal Schedl GP Racing	Ret	23	6	1	15	19	16	18	8	8	14	C	DNS	19	13	16	15	19	Ret	58
17	(South Africa) Darryn Binder	KTM	Red Bull KTM Ajo	Ret	22	13	DNS	11	13	Ret	7		23	19	C	8	18	Ret	3^{F}	12	7	19	57
18	(Italy) Tony Arbolino	Honda	Marinelli Snipers Team	17	10^{P}	20	Ret	7	7	Ret	17	17	15	9	C	11	16	14	6	Ret	8	Ret^{P F}	57
19	(Italy) Dennis Foggia	KTM	Sky Racing Team VR46	16	Ret	16	Ret	14	Ret	9	12	19	12	26	C	7	25	3^{F}	4	Ret	Ret	Ret	55
20	(Japan) Ayumu Sasaki	Honda	Petronas Sprinta Racing	8	16	11	12	16	16	Ret	19	10	22	7	C	Ret		Ret	9	10	18	11	50
21	(Malaysia) Adam Norrodin	Honda	Petronas Sprinta Racing	11	5	Ret	16	Ret	Ret	13	21	11	Ret	17	C	12	8	15	19	7	23		46
22	(Japan) Kaito Toba	Honda	Honda Team Asia	7	19	Ret	9	17	20	6	16	18	Ret	16	C	13	26	12	17	19	12	Ret	37
23	(Spain) Alonso López	Honda	Estrella Galicia 0,0	Ret	6	17	4^{F}	19	18	8	25	Ret	18	24	C	Ret	20	Ret	18	11	Ret	Ret	36
24	(Turkey) Can Öncü	KTM	Red Bull KTM Ajo																			1	25
25	(Italy) Celestino Vietti	KTM	Sky Racing Team VR46																14	3	Ret	10	24
26	(Italy) Nicolò Bulega	KTM	Sky Racing Team VR46	Ret	Ret	Ret	17	Ret	21	Ret	11	14	19	23	C	Ret	14	7					18
27	(Spain) Vicente Pérez	KTM	Reale Avintia Academy 77							DNS		Ret	21	25	C	14	15	6	Ret	20	13	Ret	16
28	(Spain) Raúl Fernández	KTM	Ángel Nieto Team Moto3							10		9					17					13	16
29	(Thailand) Nakarin Atiratphuvapat	Honda	Honda Team Asia	18	18	23	19	20	25	14	22	Ret	16	28	C	18	24	Ret	21	18	14	8	12
30	(Kazakhstan) Makar Yurchenko	KTM	CIP - Green Power	19	24	19	14	13	Ret	12													9
30	(Kazakhstan) Makar Yurchenko	Honda	Marinelli Snipers Team																		17		9
31	(Japan) Kazuki Masaki	KTM	RBA Boé Skull Rider	13	20	22	20	18	22	Ret	20	15	13	21	C	15	21	20	22	DNS	15	16	9
32	(Belgium) Livio Loi	KTM	Reale Avintia Academy 77	Ret	15	10	18	21	24	15	24												8
33	(Thailand) Somkiat Chantra	Honda	AP Honda Racing Thailand															9					7
34	(Italy) Manuel Pagliani	Honda	Leopard Racing						10														6
35	(Italy) Stefano Nepa	KTM	NRT Junior Team						Ret														4
35	(Italy) Stefano Nepa	KTM	CIP - Green Power								27	21	Ret	27	C	17	22	19	20	17	21	12	4
36	(Japan) Ai Ogura	Honda	Asia Talent Team				15				23	Ret		20									1
37	(Italy) Yari Montella	Honda	Sic58 Squadra Corse													19				16			0
38	(Thailand) Apiwat Wongthananon	KTM	VR46 Master Camp Team															16			22		0
39	(Spain) Jeremy Alcoba	Honda	Estrella Galicia 0,0				Ret										23	18					0
40	(Italy) Kevin Zannoni	TM Racing	TM Racing Factory 3570 MTA													20							0
41	(Germany) Luca Grünwald	KTM	Freudenberg Racing Team									20											0
42	(Japan) Shizuka Okazaki	Honda	Kohara Racing Team																23				0
43	(Japan) Yuto Fukushima	Honda	Team Plus One																24				0
44	(Czech Republic) Filip Salač	KTM	Cuna de Campeones Czech Talent Team										24										0
45	(Netherlands) Ryan van de Lagemaat	KTM	Lamotec Lagemaat Racing								28												0
46	(Austria) Maximilian Kofler	KTM	Motorsport Kofler											29									0
	(Malaysia) Izam Ikmal	Honda	Petronas Sprinta Racing																			Ret	0
	(United Kingdom) Jake Archer	KTM	City Lifting RS Racing												C								0
	(United Kingdom) Tom Booth-Amos	Honda	Leopard Racing												C								0
Pos.	Rider	Bike	Team	QAT (Qatar)	ARG (Argentina)	AME (United States)	SPA (Spain)	FRA (France)	ITA (Italy)	CAT (Catalonia)	NED (Netherlands)	GER (Germany)	CZE (Czech Republic)	AUT (Austria)	GBR (United Kingdom)	RSM (San Marino)	ARA (Aragon)	THA (Thailand)	JPN (Japan)	AUS (Australia)	MAL (Malaysia)	VAL (Valencian Community)	Pts

Race key
Colour	Result
Gold	Winner
Silver	2nd place
Bronze	3rd place
Green	Points finish
Blue	Non-points finish
Blue	Non-classified finish (NC)
Purple	Retired (Ret)
Red	Did not qualify (DNQ)
Black	Disqualified (DSQ)
White	Did not start (DNS)
White	Withdrew (WD)
White	Race cancelled (C)
Blank	Did not practice (DNP)
Blank	Excluded (EX)
Blank	Did not arrive (DNA)
Blank	Did not enter (empty cell)
Annotation	Meaning
P	Pole position
F	Fastest lap
Rider key
Colour	Meaning
Light blue	Rookie rider

=== Constructors' standings ===
Each constructor received the same number of points as their best placed rider in each race.

Pos.	Constructor	QAT (Qatar)	ARG (Argentina)	AME (United States)	SPA (Spain)	FRA (France)	ITA (Italy)	CAT (Catalonia)	NED (Netherlands)	GER (Germany)	CZE (Czech Republic)	AUT (Austria)	GBR (United Kingdom)	RSM (San Marino)	ARA (Aragon)	THA (Thailand)	JPN (Japan)	AUS (Australia)	MAL (Malaysia)	VAL (Valencian Community)	Pts
1	(Japan) Honda	1	2	1	4	4	1	1	1	1	1	2	C	1	1	1	2	2	1	2	401
2	(Austria) KTM	5	1	3	1	1	2	2	4	2	3	1	C	4	2	3	1	1	4	1	353
	(Italy) TM Racing													20							0
Pos.	Constructor	QAT (Qatar)	ARG (Argentina)	AME (United States)	SPA (Spain)	FRA (France)	ITA (Italy)	CAT (Catalonia)	NED (Netherlands)	GER (Germany)	CZE (Czech Republic)	AUT (Austria)	GBR (United Kingdom)	RSM (San Marino)	ARA (Aragon)	THA (Thailand)	JPN (Japan)	AUS (Australia)	MAL (Malaysia)	VAL (Valencian Community)	Pts

=== Teams' standings ===
The teams' standings were based on results obtained by regular and substitute riders; wild-card entries were ineligible.

Pos.	Team	Bike No.	QAT (Qatar)	ARG (Argentina)	AME (United States)	SPA (Spain)	FRA (France)	ITA (Italy)	CAT (Catalonia)	NED (Netherlands)	GER (Germany)	CZE (Czech Republic)	AUT (Austria)	GBR (United Kingdom)	RSM (San Marino)	ARA (Aragon)	THA (Thailand)	JPN (Japan)	AUS (Australia)	MAL (Malaysia)	VAL (Valencian Community)	Pts
1	(Italy) Del Conca Gresini Moto3	21	6	3	5	7	4	3^{F}	7	9	Ret	1	11	C	3	4	1	Ret	2	6	4	478
1	(Italy) Del Conca Gresini Moto3	88	1	11^{F}	1^{P}	Ret^{P}	Ret^{P F}	1^{P}	Ret	1^{P}	1^{P}	DNS	3	C^{P}	2^{P}	1^{P}	4	Ret	5^{P}	1^{P F}	2	478
2	(Germany) Redox PrüstelGP	12	14	1	3	2	Ret	2	2	Ret	2	6	1^{P}	C	Ret	2	NC^{P}	1	Ret	5	20	330
2	(Germany) Redox PrüstelGP	84	9	14	7	8	6	23	11	5	7	3^{P}	13	C	5	11	10	10	9	20	15	330
3	(Luxembourg) Leopard Racing	33	Ret	4	2^{F}	Ret	Ret	6	1^{P}	3	Ret	4	2	C	Ret	3	Ret	7	8	3	5	328
3	(Luxembourg) Leopard Racing	48	3	7	18	Ret	Ret	8	17	6	13	10	5^{F}	C	1	13	2	2	Ret^{F}	2	18	328
4	(Spain) Ángel Nieto Team Moto3	16	10	13	4	13	2	5	Ret	26	12	20	Ret	C	9	12	11	13	13	16	14	191
4	(Spain) Ángel Nieto Team Moto3	75	DNS	Ret	15	Ret	1	14	Ret	14	Ret	9	4	C	6	7	Ret	Ret	1	4	Ret	191
5	(United Arab Emirates) Bester Capital Dubai	5	12	Ret	21	5	10	Ret	Ret^{F}	4	6	17	6	C	Ret	9^{F}	17	11	Ret		6	178
5	(United Arab Emirates) Bester Capital Dubai	42	15	12	Ret	3	3	15	Ret	10	4	7	15	C	16	5	8	12	Ret	11	9	178
6	(Spain) Estrella Galicia 0,0	44	2^{F}	2	8	Ret	8	11	Ret	2^{F}	5^{F}	2^{F}	10	C	Ret	Ret		Ret	6	Ret	Ret	164
6	(Spain) Estrella Galicia 0,0	52															18					164
6	(Spain) Estrella Galicia 0,0	72	Ret	6	17	4^{F}	19	18	8	25	Ret	18	24	C	Ret	20	Ret	18	11	Ret	Ret	164
6	(Italy) Sic58 Squadra Corse	23	4^{P}	8	24	11	5	9	DNS	15	16	11	22	C	10	Ret	Ret	Ret		10	7	142
6	(Italy) Sic58 Squadra Corse	24	DNS	21	9	6	9	17	5	13	Ret	14	18	C	Ret	6	Ret	15	4	9	Ret	142
6	(Italy) Sic58 Squadra Corse	55																	16			142
8	(Spain) RBA Boé Skull Rider	19	5	9	12	10	Ret	4	3	8	Ret	5	8	C	4^{F}	Ret	5	8^{P}	Ret		17	125
8	(Spain) RBA Boé Skull Rider	22	13	20	22	20	18	22	Ret	20	15	13	21	C	15	21	20	22	DNS	15	16	125
9	(Italy) Sky Racing Team VR46	8	Ret	Ret	Ret	17	Ret	21	Ret	11	14	19	23	C	Ret	14	7					97
9	(Italy) Sky Racing Team VR46	10	16	Ret	16	Ret	14	Ret	9	12	19	12	26	C	7	25	3^{F}	4	Ret	Ret	Ret	97
9	(Italy) Sky Racing Team VR46	31																14	3	Ret	10	97
10	(Malaysia) Petronas Sprinta Racing	7	11	5	Ret	16	Ret	Ret	13	21	11	Ret	17	C	12	8	15	19	7	23		96
10	(Malaysia) Petronas Sprinta Racing	26																			Ret	96
10	(Malaysia) Petronas Sprinta Racing	71	8	16	11	12	16	16	Ret	19	10	22	7	C	Ret		Ret	9	10	18	11	96
11	(France) CIP - Green Power	17	Ret	17	14	Ret	12	12	4	Ret	3	Ret	12	C	Ret	10	Ret	5	14	Ret	3	91
11	(France) CIP - Green Power	76	19	24	19	14	13	Ret	12													91
11	(France) CIP - Green Power	81								27	21	Ret	27	C	17	22	19	20	17	21	12	91
12	(Finland) Red Bull KTM Ajo	25									9											64
12	(Finland) Red Bull KTM Ajo	40	Ret	22	13	DNS	11	13	Ret	7		23	19	C	8	18	Ret	3^{F}	12	7	19	64
13	(Germany) Südmetal Schedl GP Racing	65	Ret	23	6	1	15	19	16	18	8	8	14	C	DNS	19	13	16	15	19	Ret	58
14	(Italy) Marinelli Snipers Team	14	17	10^{P}	20	Ret	7	7	Ret	17	17	15	9	C	11	16	14	6	Ret	8	Ret^{P F}	57
15	(Japan) Honda Team Asia	27	7	19	Ret	9	17	20	6	16	18	Ret	16	C	13	26	12	17	19	12	Ret	49
15	(Japan) Honda Team Asia	41	18	18	23	19	20	25	14	22	Ret	16	28	C	18	24	Ret	21	18	14	8	49
16	(Spain) Reale Avintia Academy 77	11	Ret	15	10	18	21	24	15	24												24
16	(Spain) Reale Avintia Academy 77	77									Ret	21	25	C	14	15	6	Ret	20	13	Ret	24
Pos.	Team	Bike No.	QAT (Qatar)	ARG (Argentina)	AME (United States)	SPA (Spain)	FRA (France)	ITA (Italy)	CAT (Catalonia)	NED (Netherlands)	GER (Germany)	CZE (Czech Republic)	AUT (Austria)	GBR (United Kingdom)	RSM (San Marino)	ARA (Aragon)	THA (Thailand)	JPN (Japan)	AUS (Australia)	MAL (Malaysia)	VAL (Valencian Community)	Pts
