= 2016 Asia Talent Cup =

2016 Asia Talent Cup
Previous:	2015	Next:	2017

The 2016 Shell Advance Asia Talent Cup was the third season of the Asia Talent Cup. The season featured six rounds held at circuits in Asia, with three rounds held in support of the MotoGP World Championship and two rounds in support of the Superbike World Championship. The season started at Chang in Thailand on 11 March, and finished at Sepang in Malaysia on 28 October.

Thai rider Somkiat Chantra won the title after beating closest rival and future Honda Team Asia teammate Ai Ogura.

== Race calendar and results ==
The calendar was announced in December 2015.

Rnd.		Circuit	Date	Pole position	Winning rider
1	R1	(Thailand) Chang International Circuit	12 March	(Indonesia) Andi Farid Izdihar	(Japan) Ai Ogura
1	R2	(Thailand) Chang International Circuit	13 March	(Indonesia) Andi Farid Izdihar	(Thailand) Somkiat Chantra
2	R1	(Qatar) Losail International Circuit	19 March	(Thailand) Somkiat Chantra	(Indonesia) Gerry Salim
2	R2	(Qatar) Losail International Circuit	20 March	(Thailand) Somkiat Chantra	(Indonesia) Andi Farid Izdihar
3	R1	(Malaysia) Sepang International Circuit	14 May	(Japan) Kazuki Masaki	(Indonesia) Andi Farid Izdihar
3	R2	(Malaysia) Sepang International Circuit	15 May	(Japan) Kazuki Masaki	(Thailand) Somkiat Chantra
4	R1	(China) Zhuhai International Circuit	17 September	(Indonesia) Gerry Salim	(Japan) Ai Ogura
4	R2	(China) Zhuhai International Circuit	18 September	(Indonesia) Gerry Salim	(Japan) Yuki Kunii
5	R1	(Japan) Twin Ring Motegi	15 October	(Japan) Yuki Kunii	(Japan) Yuki Kunii
5	R2	(Japan) Twin Ring Motegi	16 October	(Japan) Yuki Kunii	(Japan) Ai Ogura
6	R1	(Malaysia) Sepang International Circuit	29 October	(Indonesia) Andi Farid Izdihar	(Indonesia) Andi Farid Izdihar
6	R2	(Malaysia) Sepang International Circuit	30 October	(Indonesia) Andi Farid Izdihar	(Thailand) Somkiat Chantra

== Entry list ==
The entry list was announced in November 2015.

No.	Rider	Rounds
2	(Japan) Kazuki Masaki	All
3	(Turkey) Can Öncü	All
4	(Indonesia) Gerry Salim	All
5	(Japan) Yuki Kunii	All
6	(Indonesia) Irfan Ardiansyah	1–3, 5–6
7	(Turkey) Deniz Öncü	All
8	(Australia) Tom Edwards	1–3, 5–6
9	(Japan) Ai Ogura	All
10	(Indonesia) Dwiki Suparta	1–2, 4–6
11	(Malaysia) Izam Ikmal	All
12	(Japan) Ryusei Yamanaka	All
13	(Malaysia) Idham Khairuddin	All
14	(Turkey) Bahattin Sofuoğlu	All
15	(Japan) Shogo Kawasaki	All
16	(Japan) Hiroki Nakamura	5–6
17	(Indonesia) Alif Utama	1–4, 6
18	(Thailand) Somkiat Chantra	All
19	(Japan) Riku Sugawara	All
20	(China) Chun Kit Law	1–4
21	(Thailand) Waraphod Niamsakhonsakul	All
22	(India) Ahamed Yanseen	1–4
23	(Indonesia) Andi Farid Izdihar	All

== Championship standings ==
Scoring system

Points were awarded to the top fifteen finishers. A rider had to finish the race to earn points.

Position	1st	2nd	3rd	4th	5th	6th	7th	8th	9th	10th	11th	12th	13th	14th	15th
Points	25	20	16	13	11	10	9	8	7	6	5	4	3	2	1

Pos.	Rider	THA (Thailand)		QAT (Qatar)		MAL1 (Malaysia)		CHN (China)		JPN (Japan)		MAL2 (Malaysia)		Pts
Pos.	Rider	R1	R2	R1	R2	R1	R2	R1	R2	R1	R2	R1	R2	Pts
1	(Thailand) Somkiat Chantra	4	1	6^{P}	2^{P}	4	1	3	8	6	4	Ret	1	178
2	(Japan) Ai Ogura	1	4	2	7	5	Ret	1	3	3	1	4	Ret	173
3	(Indonesia) Andi Farid Izdihar	Ret^{P}	3^{P}	5	1	1	3	2	7	5	7	1^{P}	Ret^{P}	167
4	(Japan) Ryusei Yamanaka	3	2	4	5	2	2	Ret	5	4	2	6	4	167
5	(Indonesia) Gerry Salim	2	6	1	3	3	Ret	4^{P}	2^{P}	10	6	16	7	145
6	(Japan) Yuki Kunii	6	8	8	6	7	4	5	1	1^{P}	Ret^{P}	3	9	142
7	(Japan) Kazuki Masaki	5	5	3	4	6^{P}	12^{P}	Ret	4	2	3	2	Ret	134
8	(Japan) Shogo Kawasaki	7	7	7	8	11	7	Ret	10	7	8	11	Ret	77
9	(Turkey) Can Öncü	9	13	13	16	10	Ret	7	9	8	5	15	2	75
10	(Turkey) Deniz Öncü	11	9	12	15	Ret	14	6	6	Ret	10	5	3	72
11	(Japan) Riku Sugawara	13	12	10	10	8	5	9	Ret	9	9	Ret	13	62
12	(Malaysia) Idham Khairuddin	12	14	14	13	9	6	8	11	12	Ret	7	8	62
13	(Indonesia) Irfan Ardiansyah	8	Ret	9	9	Ret	8			Ret	13	10	5	50
14	(Australia) Tom Edwards	10	10	Ret	11	Ret	9			13	11	8	10	46
15	(Thailand) Waraphod Niamsakhonsakul		11	11	12	15	11	10	Ret	Ret	15	13	12	34
16	(Turkey) Bahattin Sofuoğlu	Ret	17	15	17	Ret	13	12	12	14	12	Ret	6	28
17	(Malaysia) Izam Ikmal	18	18	16	20	12	10	Ret	Ret	15	14	Ret	11	18
18	(Indonesia) Alif Utama	15	16	17	14	Ret	Ret	11	13			14	Ret	13
19	(Japan) Hiroki Nakamura									11	Ret	9	Ret	12
20	(Indonesia) Dwiki Suparta	14	15	18	19			15	Ret	16	Ret	12	Ret	8
21	(India) Ahamed Yanseen	16	19	19	18	13	15	14	14					8
22	(China) Chun Kit Law	17	20	20	21	14	16	13	Ret					5
Pos.	Rider	R1	R2	R1	R2	R1	R2	R1	R2	R1	R2	R1	R2	Pts
Pos.	Rider	THA (Thailand)		QAT (Qatar)		MAL1 (Malaysia)		CHN (China)		JPN (Japan)		MAL2 (Malaysia)		Pts

Colour	Result
Gold	Winner
Silver	Second place
Bronze	Third place
Green	Points classification
Blue	Non-points classification
Blue	Non-classified finish (NC)
Purple	Retired, not classified (Ret)
Red	Did not qualify (DNQ)
Red	Did not pre-qualify (DNPQ)
Black	Disqualified (DSQ)
White	Did not start (DNS)
White	Withdrew (WD)
White	Race cancelled (C)
Blank	Did not practice (DNP)
Blank	Did not arrive (DNA)
Blank	Excluded (EX)

P – Pole position
