= Nakarin Atiratphuvapat =

Thai motorcycle racer (born 1996)

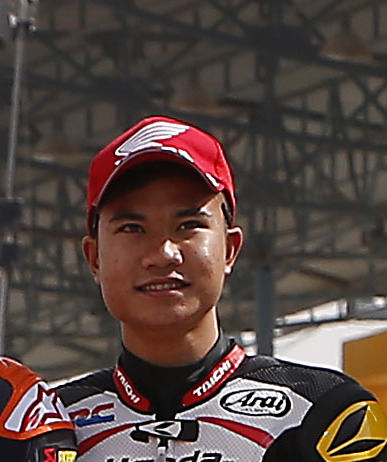
- Atiratphuvapat in 2018
- Nationality: Thai
- Born: 17 January 1996 (age 30); Khon Kaen, Thailand
- Current team: Honda Racing Thailand
- Bike number: 41
Motorcycle racing career statistics
Moto2 World Championship
Active years	2025–
Manufacturers	Kalex
Championships	0
Starts / Wins / Podiums / Poles / F. laps / Points; 5 / 0 / 0 / 0 / 0 / 0
Moto3 World Championship
Active years	2017–2018
Manufacturers	Honda
Championships	0
2018 championship position	29th (12 pts)
Starts / Wins / Podiums / Poles / F. laps / Points; 36 / 0 / 0 / 0 / 0 / 28

Nakarin Atiratphuvapat (Thai: นครินทร์ อธิรัฐภูวภัทร์; born 17 January 1996) is a Thai motorcycle racer.

== Career ==
Atiratphuvapat was an Asia Talent Cup contestant in 2014 and finished the season eighth overall. He remained in the Asia Talent Cup for 2015 , where he finished fourth overall in the standings.

Atiratphuvapat was signed up to race in the Moto3 World Championship for Honda Team Asia for 2017.

== Career statistics ==
=== Asia Talent Cup ===
==== Races by year ====
(key) (Races in bold indicate pole position; races in italics indicate fastest lap)

Year	Bike	1	2	3		4		5	6		Pos	Pts
Year	Bike	R1	R1	R1	R2	R1	R2	R1	R1	R2	Pos	Pts
2014	Honda	QAT; 4	IDN; 21	CHN1; 13	CHN2; 6	MAL1; Ret	MAL2; 5	JAP; 8	MYS1; 7	MYS2; 9	8th	61

Year	Bike	1	2	3	4	5	6	7	8	9	10	11	12	Pos	Pts
2015	Honda	THA1; 5	THA2; 1	QAT1; 6	QAT2; Ret	MAL1; 5	MAL2; 1	CHN1; 9	CHN2; Ret	JPN1; 5	JPN2; 11	SEP1; 10	SEP2; 4	4th	124

=== FIM CEV Moto3 Junior World Championship ===
==== Races by year ====
(key)

Year	Bike	1	2	3	4	5	6	7	8	9	10	11	12	Pos	Pts
2016	Honda	VAL; Ret	VAL; 20	LMS; 7	ARA; 17	CAT; Ret	CAT; 8	ALB; 14	ALG; 10	JER; 14	JER; 10	VAL; Ret	VAL; Ret	17th	33

=== Grand Prix motorcycle racing ===
==== By season ====
Season	Class	Motorcycle	Team	Race	Win	Podium	Pole	FLap	Pts	Plcd
2017	Moto3	Honda	Honda Team Asia	18	0	0	0	0	16	25th
2018	Moto3	Honda	Honda Team Asia	18	0	0	0	0	12	29th
2025	Moto2	Kalex	Idemitsu Honda Team Asia	5	0	0	0	0	0	33rd
Total				**41**	**0**	**0**	**0**	**0**	**28**	

==== Races by year ====
(key) (Races in bold indicate pole position; races in italics indicate fastest lap)

Year	Class	Bike	1	2	3	4	5	6	7	8	9	10	11	12	13	14	15	16	17	18	19	20	21	22	Pos	Pts
2017	Moto3	Honda	QAT; 18	ARG; 24	AME; 24	SPA; 21	FRA; 13	ITA; 24	CAT; 21	NED; 18	GER; 23	CZE; 10	AUT; Ret	GBR; 14	RSM; Ret	ARA; Ret	JPN; 11	AUS; 17	MAL; 18	VAL; 21					25th	16
2018	Moto3	Honda	QAT; 18	ARG; 18	AME; 23	SPA; 19	FRA; 20	ITA; 25	CAT; 14	NED; 22	GER; Ret	CZE; 16	AUT; 28	GBR; C	RSM; 18	ARA; 24	THA; Ret	JPN; 21	AUS; 18	MAL; 14	VAL; 8				29th	12
2025	Moto2	Kalex	THA	ARG	AME	QAT	SPA	FRA	GBR	ARA; 24	ITA; 25	NED; Ret	GER	CZE	AUT; 25	HUN; 21	CAT	RSM	JPN	INA	AUS	MAL	POR	VAL	33rd	0

=== ARRC Supersports 600 Championship ===
==== Races by year ====
(key) (Races in bold indicate pole position; races in italics indicate fastest lap)

Year	Bike	1		2		3		4		5		6		Pos	Pts
Year	Bike	R1	R2	R1	R2	R1	R2	R1	R2	R1	R2	R1	R2	Pos	Pts
2022	Honda	CHA; 7	CHA; 2	SEP; 6	SEP; 4	SUG; 4	SUG; 4	SEP; 4	SEP; 4	CHA; 2	CHA; 4			3rd	137
2023	Honda	CHA; 2	CHA; 1	SEP; 4	SEP; 3	SUG; 3	SUG; DSQ	MAN; 6	MAN; 2	ZHU; 5	ZHU; 1	CHA; 4	CHA; 4	3rd	182

=== Asia Road Racing Championship ===
==== Races by year ====
(key) (Races in bold indicate pole position, races in italics indicate fastest lap)

Year	Bike	1		2		3		4		5		6		Pos	Pts
Year	Bike	R1	R2	R1	R2	R1	R2	R1	R2	R1	R2	R1	R2	Pos	Pts
2024	Honda	**CHA**; 5	**CHA**; 3	ZHU; 5	ZHU; C	MOT; 2	MOT; 3	MAN; 5	MAN; 9	SEP; 3	SEP; 2	CHA; 4	CHA; 8	4th	149
2025	Honda	CHA; 1	CHA; 1	SEP; 9	SEP; 4	MOT; 11	MOT; 4	MAN; 2	MAN; 8	SEP; 3	SEP; 2	CHA; 4	CHA; 1	2nd	190
2026	Honda	SEP; 6	SEP; 13	CHA; 6	CHA; 3	MOT; 4	MOT; 3	MAN	MAN	SEP	SEP	CHA	CHA	4th*	68*

=== All Japan Road Race Championship ===
==== Races by year ====
(key) (Races in bold indicate pole position; races in italics indicate fastest lap)

Year	Class	Bike	1	2	3	4	5	6	Pos	Pts
2025	ST1000	Honda	SUG; 2	MOT1	MOT2	AUT; 6	OKA; 5	SUZ; 4	6th	52

=== Suzuka 8 Hours results ===
Year	Class	Team	Co-riders	Bike	Pos
2025	**EWC**	(Japan) Honda Asia-Dream Racing with Astemo	(Malaysia) Azroy Hakeem (Malaysia) Zaqhwan Zaidi	Honda CBR1000RR-R	10th
2026	**EWC**	(Japan) Honda Asia-Dream Racing with Astemo	(Malaysia) Khairul Idham Pawi (Indonesia) Adenanta Putra	Honda CBR1000RR-R	TBD
