= 2019 Motorcycle Grand Prix of the Americas =

(United States) 2019 Grand Prix of the Americas
Race details
- Race 3 of 19 races in the 2019 Grand Prix motorcycle racing season
- Date: April 14, 2019
- Official name: Red Bull Grand Prix of the Americas
- Location: Circuit of the Americas, Austin, United States
- Course: Permanent racing facility; 5.513 km (3.426 mi)

MotoGP
Pole position
Rider	(Spain) Marc Márquez	Honda
Time	2:03.787	
Fastest lap
Rider	(Spain) Marc Márquez	Honda
Time	2:04.277 on lap 4	
Podium
First	(Spain) Álex Rins	Suzuki
Second	(Italy) Valentino Rossi	Yamaha
Third	(Australia) Jack Miller	Ducati

Moto2
Pole position
Rider	(Germany) Marcel Schrötter	Kalex
Time	2:10.875	
Fastest lap
Rider	(Switzerland) Thomas Lüthi	Kalex
Time	2:10.041 on lap 9	
Podium
First	(Switzerland) Thomas Lüthi	Kalex
Second	(Germany) Marcel Schrötter	Kalex
Third	(Spain) Jorge Navarro	Speed Up

Moto3
Pole position
Rider	(Italy) Niccolò Antonelli	Honda
Time	2:31.346	
Fastest lap
Rider	(Spain) Alonso López	Honda
Time	2:16.931 on lap 10	
Podium
First	(Spain) Arón Canet	KTM
Second	(Spain) Jaume Masiá	KTM
Third	(Italy) Andrea Migno	KTM

The 2019 Motorcycle Grand Prix of the Americas was the third round of the 2019 MotoGP season. It was held at the Circuit of the Americas in Austin on April 14, 2019.

== Classification ==
=== MotoGP ===
Pos.	No.	Rider	Team	Manufacturer	Laps	Time/Retired	Grid	Points
1	42	(Spain) Álex Rins	Team Suzuki Ecstar	Suzuki	20	41:45.499	7	25
2	46	(Italy) Valentino Rossi	Monster Energy Yamaha MotoGP	Yamaha	20	+0.462	2	20
3	43	(Australia) Jack Miller	Pramac Racing	Ducati	20	+8.454	4	16
4	4	(Italy) Andrea Dovizioso	Mission Winnow Ducati	Ducati	20	+9.420	13	13
5	21	(Italy) Franco Morbidelli	Petronas Yamaha SRT	Yamaha	20	+18.021	10	11
6	9	(Italy) Danilo Petrucci	Mission Winnow Ducati	Ducati	20	+21.476	8	10
7	20	(France) Fabio Quartararo	Petronas Yamaha SRT	Yamaha	20	+26.111	9	9
8	44	(Spain) Pol Espargaró	Red Bull KTM Factory Racing	KTM	20	+29.743	5	8
9	63	(Italy) Francesco Bagnaia	Pramac Racing	Ducati	20	+30.608	12	7
10	30	(Japan) Takaaki Nakagami	LCR Honda Idemitsu	Honda	20	+31.011	15	6
11	12	(Spain) Maverick Viñales	Monster Energy Yamaha MotoGP	Yamaha	20	+34.077	6	5
12	29	(Italy) Andrea Iannone	Aprilia Racing Team Gresini	Aprilia	20	+34.779	17	4
13	5	(France) Johann Zarco	Red Bull KTM Factory Racing	KTM	20	+42.458	19	3
14	88	(Portugal) Miguel Oliveira	Red Bull KTM Tech3	KTM	20	+44.272	18	2
15	53	(Spain) Tito Rabat	Reale Avintia Racing	Ducati	20	+44.623	22	1
16	17	(Czech Republic) Karel Abraham	Reale Avintia Racing	Ducati	20	+44.740	20	
17	36	(Spain) Joan Mir	Team Suzuki Ecstar	Suzuki	20	+48.063	14	
18	55	(Malaysia) Hafizh Syahrin	Red Bull KTM Tech3	KTM	20	+1:07.683	21	
Ret	99	(Spain) Jorge Lorenzo	Repsol Honda Team	Honda	10	Electronics	11	
Ret	93	(Spain) Marc Márquez	Repsol Honda Team	Honda	8	Accident	1	
Ret	35	(United Kingdom) Cal Crutchlow	LCR Honda Castrol	Honda	5	Accident	3	
Ret	41	(Spain) Aleix Espargaró	Aprilia Racing Team Gresini	Aprilia	5	Accident Damage	16	

=== Moto2 ===
Pos.	No.	Rider	Manufacturer	Laps	Time/Retired	Grid	Points
1	12	(Switzerland) Thomas Lüthi	Kalex	18	39:11.508	4	25
2	23	(Germany) Marcel Schrötter	Kalex	18	+2.532	1	20
3	9	(Spain) Jorge Navarro	Speed Up	18	+3.836	6	16
4	54	(Italy) Mattia Pasini	Kalex	18	+4.757	7	13
5	73	(Spain) Álex Márquez	Kalex	18	+7.741	2	11
6	10	(Italy) Luca Marini	Kalex	18	+8.031	10	10
7	22	(United Kingdom) Sam Lowes	Kalex	18	+8.282	3	9
8	24	(Italy) Simone Corsi	Kalex	18	+8.953	9	8
9	33	(Italy) Enea Bastianini	Kalex	18	+10.706	17	7
10	5	(Italy) Andrea Locatelli	Kalex	18	+16.868	11	6
11	87	(Australia) Remy Gardner	Kalex	18	+25.633	18	5
12	45	(Japan) Tetsuta Nagashima	Kalex	18	+25.948	14	4
13	64	(Netherlands) Bo Bendsneyder	NTS	18	+26.997	16	3
14	77	(Switzerland) Dominique Aegerter	MV Agusta	18	+27.462	29	2
15	88	(Spain) Jorge Martín	KTM	18	+27.482	8	1
16	2	(Switzerland) Jesko Raffin	NTS	18	+39.435	21	
17	89	(Malaysia) Khairul Idham Pawi	Kalex	18	+49.582	23	
18	65	(Germany) Philipp Öttl	KTM	18	+51.247	25	
19	3	(Germany) Lukas Tulovic	KTM	18	+51.380	26	
20	35	(Thailand) Somkiat Chantra	Kalex	18	+53.778	24	
21	6	(Italy) Gabriele Ruiu	MV Agusta	18	+1:19.156	27	
22	20	(Indonesia) Dimas Ekky Pratama	Kalex	18	+1:19.286	30	
Ret	27	(Spain) Iker Lecuona	KTM	13	Accident	19	
Ret	72	(Italy) Marco Bezzecchi	KTM	12	Accident Damage	12	
Ret	18	(Andorra) Xavi Cardelús	KTM	6	Rider In Pain	28	
Ret	41	(South Africa) Brad Binder	KTM	2	Clutch	5	
Ret	21	(Italy) Fabio Di Giannantonio	Speed Up	0	Accident	13	
Ret	7	(Italy) Lorenzo Baldassarri	Kalex	0	Accident	15	
Ret	97	(Spain) Xavi Vierge	Kalex	0	Accident	20	
Ret	16	(United States) Joe Roberts	KTM	0	Accident	22	
DNS	96	(United Kingdom) Jake Dixon	KTM		Did not start		
OFFICIAL MOTO2 REPORT

- Jake Dixon was declared unfit to start the race due to a concussion.

=== Moto3 ===
Pos.	No.	Rider	Manufacturer	Laps	Time/Retired	Grid	Points
1	44	(Spain) Arón Canet	KTM	17	39:06.761	6	25
2	5	(Spain) Jaume Masiá	KTM	17	+0.909	4	20
3	16	(Italy) Andrea Migno	KTM	17	+1.077	13	16
4	19	(Argentina) Gabriel Rodrigo	Honda	17	+1.104	3	13
5	23	(Italy) Niccolò Antonelli	Honda	17	+1.187	1	11
6	14	(Italy) Tony Arbolino	Honda	17	+1.322	18	10
7	25	(Spain) Raúl Fernández	KTM	17	+1.418	2	9
8	21	(Spain) Alonso López	Honda	17	+1.596	9	8
9	13	(Italy) Celestino Vietti	KTM	17	+1.735	21	7
10	7	(Italy) Dennis Foggia	KTM	17	+7.876	14	6
11	79	(Japan) Ai Ogura	Honda	17	+8.020	19	5
12	42	(Spain) Marcos Ramírez	Honda	17	+8.644	10	4
13	48	(Italy) Lorenzo Dalla Porta	Honda	17	+8.779	11	3
14	17	(United Kingdom) John McPhee	Honda	17	+8.780	8	2
15	40	(South Africa) Darryn Binder	KTM	17	+9.369	5	1
16	22	(Japan) Kazuki Masaki	KTM	17	+25.290	16	
17	77	(Spain) Vicente Pérez	KTM	17	+33.964	29	
18	76	(Kazakhstan) Makar Yurchenko	KTM	17	+34.165	22	
19	11	(Spain) Sergio García	Honda	17	+34.462	25	
20	12	(Czech Republic) Filip Salač	KTM	17	+34.590	28	
21	54	(Italy) Riccardo Rossi	Honda	17	+50.739	26	
Ret	71	(Japan) Ayumu Sasaki	Honda	15	Accident	17	
Ret	81	(Spain) Aleix Viu	KTM	13	Handling	27	
Ret	24	(Japan) Tatsuki Suzuki	Honda	12	Accident	7	
Ret	69	(United Kingdom) Tom Booth-Amos	KTM	10	Accident Damage	23	
Ret	55	(Italy) Romano Fenati	Honda	9	Accident	12	
Ret	84	(Czech Republic) Jakub Kornfeil	KTM	9	Accident	15	
Ret	27	(Japan) Kaito Toba	Honda	9	Accident	24	
Ret	61	(Turkey) Can Öncü	KTM	2	Accident Damage	20	
OFFICIAL MOTO3 REPORT

== Championship standings after the race ==
=== MotoGP ===
Pos.	Rider	Points
1	(Italy) Andrea Dovizioso	54
2	(Italy) Valentino Rossi	51
3	(Spain) Álex Rins	49
4	(Spain) Marc Márquez	45
5	(Italy) Danilo Petrucci	30
6	(Australia) Jack Miller	29
7	(Japan) Takaaki Nakagami	22
8	(United Kingdom) Cal Crutchlow	19
9	(Spain) Pol Espargaró	18
10	(France) Fabio Quartararo	17

=== Moto2 ===
Pos.	Rider	Points
1	(Italy) Lorenzo Baldassarri	50
2	(Germany) Marcel Schrötter	47
3	(Switzerland) Thomas Lüthi	45
4	(Australia) Remy Gardner	38
5	(Spain) Álex Márquez	36
6	(Italy) Luca Marini	27
7	(Spain) Jorge Navarro	24
8	(Italy) Enea Bastianini	21
9	(United Kingdom) Sam Lowes	19
10	(South Africa) Brad Binder	14

=== Moto3 ===
Pos.	Rider	Points
1	(Spain) Jaume Masiá	45
2	(Spain) Arón Canet	45
3	(Italy) Lorenzo Dalla Porta	32
4	(Italy) Niccolò Antonelli	32
5	(Japan) Kaito Toba	31
6	(Italy) Tony Arbolino	26
7	(Argentina) Gabriel Rodrigo	24
8	(Spain) Marcos Ramírez	24
9	(Italy) Andrea Migno	23
10	(South Africa) Darryn Binder	21

Previous race: 2019 Argentine Grand Prix	FIM Grand Prix World Championship; 2019 season	Next race: 2019 Spanish Grand Prix
Previous race: 2018 Grand Prix of the Americas	Motorcycle Grand Prix of the Americas	Next race: 2021 Grand Prix of the Americas
