= 2019 Dutch TT =

(Netherlands) 2019 Dutch TT
Race details
- Race 8 of 19 races in the 2019 Grand Prix motorcycle racing season
- Date: 30 June 2019
- Official name: Motul TT Assen
- Location: TT Circuit Assen, Assen, Netherlands
- Course: Permanent racing facility; 4.542 km (2.822 mi)

MotoGP
Pole position
Rider	(France) Fabio Quartararo	Yamaha
Time	1:32.017	
Fastest lap
Rider	(Spain) Marc Márquez	Honda
Time	1:33.712 on lap 4	
Podium
First	(Spain) Maverick Viñales	Yamaha
Second	(Spain) Marc Márquez	Honda
Third	(France) Fabio Quartararo	Yamaha

Moto2
Pole position
Rider	(Australia) Remy Gardner	Kalex
Time	1:36.572	
Fastest lap
Rider	(Spain) Augusto Fernández	Kalex
Time	1:37.323 on lap 3	
Podium
First	(Spain) Augusto Fernández	Kalex
Second	(South Africa) Brad Binder	KTM
Third	(Italy) Luca Marini	Kalex

Moto3
Pole position
Rider	(Italy) Niccolò Antonelli	Honda
Time	1:41.232	
Fastest lap
Rider	(Italy) Dennis Foggia	KTM
Time	1:42.627 on lap 5	
Podium
First	(Italy) Tony Arbolino	Honda
Second	(Italy) Lorenzo Dalla Porta	Honda
Third	(Czech Republic) Jakub Kornfeil	KTM

The 2019 Dutch TT was the eighth round of the 2019 MotoGP season. It was held at the TT Circuit Assen in Assen on 30 June 2019.

== Classification ==
=== MotoGP ===
Pos.	No.	Rider	Team	Manufacturer	Laps	Time/Retired	Grid	Points
1	12	(Spain) Maverick Viñales	Monster Energy Yamaha MotoGP	Yamaha	26	40:55.415	2	25
2	93	(Spain) Marc Márquez	Repsol Honda Team	Honda	26	+4.854	4	20
3	20	(France) Fabio Quartararo	Petronas Yamaha SRT	Yamaha	26	+9.738	1	16
4	4	(Italy) Andrea Dovizioso	Ducati Team	Ducati	26	+14.147	11	13
5	21	(Italy) Franco Morbidelli	Petronas Yamaha SRT	Yamaha	26	+14.467	9	11
6	9	(Italy) Danilo Petrucci	Ducati Team	Ducati	26	+14.794	7	10
7	35	(United Kingdom) Cal Crutchlow	LCR Honda Castrol	Honda	26	+18.361	6	9
8	36	(Spain) Joan Mir	Team Suzuki Ecstar	Suzuki	26	+24.268	5	8
9	43	(Australia) Jack Miller	Pramac Racing	Ducati	26	+26.496	10	7
10	29	(Italy) Andrea Iannone	Aprilia Racing Team Gresini	Aprilia	26	+26.997	19	6
11	44	(Spain) Pol Espargaró	Red Bull KTM Factory Racing	KTM	26	+28.732	12	5
12	41	(Spain) Aleix Espargaró	Aprilia Racing Team Gresini	Aprilia	26	+34.095	15	4
13	88	(Portugal) Miguel Oliveira	Red Bull KTM Tech3	KTM	26	+34.181	20 (Note: 3-place grid penalty.)	3
14	63	(Italy) Francesco Bagnaia	Pramac Racing	Ducati	26	+34.249	13	2
15	55	(Malaysia) Hafizh Syahrin	Red Bull KTM Tech3	KTM	26	+34.494	18	1
16	53	(Spain) Tito Rabat	Reale Avintia Racing	Ducati	26	+48.357	21	
17	17	(Czech Republic) Karel Abraham	Reale Avintia Racing	Ducati	25	+1 lap	16	
Ret	5	(France) Johann Zarco	Red Bull KTM Factory Racing	KTM	16	Handling	17	
Ret	30	(Japan) Takaaki Nakagami	LCR Honda Idemitsu	Honda	4	Collision	8	
Ret	46	(Italy) Valentino Rossi	Monster Energy Yamaha MotoGP	Yamaha	4	Collision	14	
Ret	42	(Spain) Álex Rins	Team Suzuki Ecstar	Suzuki	2	Accident	3	
DNS	99	(Spain) Jorge Lorenzo	Repsol Honda Team	Honda		Did not start		
Sources:

- Jorge Lorenzo suffered a tumble in the gravel during the first practice session and fractured two vertebras and withdrew from the event. He subsequently missed the next three rounds in recovery, and upon return claimed to be riding under duress of intense pain. Years later, Jorge Lorenzo confessed in several interviews that this fall was the reason for his retirement because he was already afraid of suffering a new fall that would cause an injury that would cause a disability and he became afraid of the motorcycle.

=== Moto2 ===
Pos.	No.	Rider	Manufacturer	Laps	Time/Retired	Grid	Points
1	40	(Spain) Augusto Fernández	Kalex	24	39:24.779	13	25
2	41	(South Africa) Brad Binder	KTM	24	+0.612	2	20
3	10	(Italy) Luca Marini	Kalex	24	+3.686	11	16
4	12	(Switzerland) Thomas Lüthi	Kalex	24	+4.028	8	13
5	45	(Japan) Tetsuta Nagashima	Kalex	24	+5.391	15	11
6	5	(Italy) Andrea Locatelli	Kalex	24	+13.127	10	10
7	62	(Italy) Stefano Manzi	MV Agusta	24	+13.183	29 (Note: Back of the grid start penalty.)	9
8	23	(Germany) Marcel Schrötter	Kalex	24	+13.567	12	8
9	77	(Switzerland) Dominique Aegerter	MV Agusta	24	+19.792	19	7
10	72	(Italy) Marco Bezzecchi	KTM	24	+21.291	20	6
11	21	(Italy) Fabio Di Giannantonio	Speed Up	24	+23.591	6	5
12	96	(United Kingdom) Jake Dixon	KTM	24	+26.585	23	4
13	3	(Germany) Lukas Tulovic	KTM	24	+30.817	25	3
14	16	(United States) Joe Roberts	KTM	24	+34.122	26	2
15	27	(Spain) Iker Lecuona	KTM	24	+34.406 (Note: 3-second penalty.)	17	1
16	4	(South Africa) Steven Odendaal	NTS	24	+40.034	27	
17	94	(Germany) Jonas Folger	Kalex	24	+51.405	21	
18	18	(Andorra) Xavi Cardelús	KTM	24	+59.200	28	
Ret	73	(Spain) Álex Márquez	Kalex	22	Collision	4	
Ret	7	(Italy) Lorenzo Baldassarri	Kalex	22	Collision	16	
Ret	97	(Spain) Xavi Vierge	Kalex	19	Accident	3	
Ret	33	(Italy) Enea Bastianini	Kalex	19	Collision	9	
Ret	88	(Spain) Jorge Martín	KTM	14	Accident	14	
Ret	22	(United Kingdom) Sam Lowes	Kalex	10	Accident	5	
Ret	9	(Spain) Jorge Navarro	Speed Up	10	Accident	7	
Ret	87	(Australia) Remy Gardner	Kalex	9	Accident	1	
Ret	11	(Italy) Nicolò Bulega	Kalex	2	Gearbox	18	
Ret	24	(Italy) Simone Corsi	Kalex	1	Accident	24	
Ret	64	(Netherlands) Bo Bendsneyder	NTS	1	Accident	22	
DNS	35	(Thailand) Somkiat Chantra	Kalex		Did not start		
DNS	65	(Germany) Philipp Öttl	KTM		Did not start		
WD	20	(Indonesia) Dimas Ekky Pratama	Kalex		Withdrew		
OFFICIAL MOTO2 REPORT

- Somkiat Chantra suffered a broken left wrist in a crash during Sunday warm-up session and withdrew from the event.
- Philipp Öttl withdrew from the event due to effects from a crash during previous round at Catalunya.
- Dimas Ekky Pratama suffered a concussion in a crash during Friday practice and was declared unfit to compete.

=== Moto3 ===
Pos.	No.	Rider	Manufacturer	Laps	Time/Retired	Grid	Points
1	14	(Italy) Tony Arbolino	Honda	22	38:03.113	3	25
2	48	(Italy) Lorenzo Dalla Porta	Honda	22	+0.045	8	20
3	84	(Czech Republic) Jakub Kornfeil	KTM	22	+1.562	7	16
4	19	(Argentina) Gabriel Rodrigo	Honda	22	+2.158	16 (Note: 6-place grid penalty.)	13
5	17	(United Kingdom) John McPhee	Honda	22	+2.201	20	11
6	79	(Japan) Ai Ogura	Honda	22	+2.264	6	10
7	42	(Spain) Marcos Ramírez	Honda	22	+2.436	12	9
8	23	(Italy) Niccolò Antonelli	Honda	22	+2.580	1	8
9	7	(Italy) Dennis Foggia	KTM	22	+2.758	21	7
10	21	(Spain) Alonso López	Honda	22	+2.900	24	6
11	55	(Italy) Romano Fenati	Honda	22	+2.916	13	5
12	44	(Spain) Arón Canet	KTM	22	+3.081	9	4
13	22	(Japan) Kazuki Masaki	KTM	22	+3.267	14	3
14	12	(Czech Republic) Filip Salač	KTM	22	+3.737	26	2
15	11	(Spain) Sergio García	Honda	22	+12.705	15	1
16	61	(Turkey) Can Öncü	KTM	22	+12.796	23	
17	71	(Japan) Ayumu Sasaki	Honda	22	+12.800	10	
18	76	(Kazakhstan) Makar Yurchenko	KTM	22	+12.894	22	
19	16	(Italy) Andrea Migno	KTM	22	+33.346	19	
20	82	(Italy) Stefano Nepa	KTM	22	+36.069	27	
21	54	(Italy) Riccardo Rossi	Honda	22	+51.064	29	
22	18	(Netherlands) Ryan van de Lagemaat	KTM	22	+1:32.359	28	
23	69	(United Kingdom) Tom Booth-Amos	KTM	22	+1:48.509	30 (Note: 12-place grid penalty.)	
Ret	40	(South Africa) Darryn Binder	KTM	18	Accident	25	
Ret	13	(Italy) Celestino Vietti	KTM	17	Collision Damage	5	
Ret	25	(Spain) Raúl Fernández	KTM	17	Collision Damage	11	
Ret	27	(Japan) Kaito Toba	Honda	17	Collision Damage	2	
Ret	24	(Japan) Tatsuki Suzuki	Honda	16	Collision	4	
Ret	75	(Spain) Albert Arenas	KTM	15	Accident	18	
Ret	5	(Spain) Jaume Masiá	KTM	15	Mechanical	17	
OFFICIAL MOTO3 REPORT

== Championship standings after the race ==
=== MotoGP ===
Pos.	Rider	Points
1	(Spain) Marc Márquez	160
2	(Italy) Andrea Dovizioso	116
3	(Italy) Danilo Petrucci	108
4	(Spain) Álex Rins	101
5	(Italy) Valentino Rossi	72
6	(France) Fabio Quartararo	67
7	(Spain) Maverick Viñales	65
8	(Australia) Jack Miller	60
9	(Spain) Pol Espargaró	52
10	(United Kingdom) Cal Crutchlow	51

=== Moto2 ===
Pos.	Rider	Points
1	(Switzerland) Thomas Lüthi	117
2	(Spain) Álex Márquez	111
3	(Spain) Augusto Fernández	92
4	(Spain) Jorge Navarro	89
5	(Italy) Lorenzo Baldassarri	88
6	(Italy) Luca Marini	84
7	(Germany) Marcel Schrötter	81
8	(South Africa) Brad Binder	64
9	(Italy) Enea Bastianini	56
10	(Australia) Remy Gardner	41

=== Moto3 ===
Pos.	Rider	Points
1	(Spain) Arón Canet	107
2	(Italy) Lorenzo Dalla Porta	100
3	(Italy) Niccolò Antonelli	83
4	(Italy) Tony Arbolino	76
5	(Italy) Celestino Vietti	68
6	(Spain) Jaume Masiá	65
7	(Spain) Marcos Ramírez	58
8	(United Kingdom) John McPhee	58
9	(Japan) Kaito Toba	51
10	(Argentina) Gabriel Rodrigo	50

== Notes ==
Previous race: 2019 Catalan Grand Prix	FIM Grand Prix World Championship; 2019 season	Next race: 2019 German Grand Prix
Previous race: 2018 Dutch TT	Dutch TT	Next race: 2021 Dutch TT
