= 2024 Motorcycle Grand Prix of the Americas =

Motorcycle races in Austin

(United States) 2024 Grand Prix of the Americas
Race details
- Race 3 of 20 races in the 2024 Grand Prix motorcycle racing season
- Date: April 14, 2024
- Official name: Red Bull Grand Prix of the Americas
- Location: Circuit of the Americas; Austin, Texas, United States
- Course: Permanent racing facility; 5.513 km (3.426 mi)

MotoGP
Pole position
Rider	(Spain) Maverick Viñales	Aprilia
Time	2:00.864	
Fastest lap
Rider	(Spain) Maverick Viñales	Aprilia
Time	2:02.575 on lap 14	
Podium
First	(Spain) Maverick Viñales	Aprilia
Second	(Spain) Pedro Acosta	KTM
Third	(Italy) Enea Bastianini	Ducati

Moto2
Pole position
Rider	(Spain) Arón Canet	Kalex
Time	2:07.631	
Fastest lap
Rider	(Spain) Alonso López	Boscoscuro
Time	2:08.210 on lap 6	
Podium
First	(Spain) Sergio García	Boscoscuro
Second	(United States) Joe Roberts	Kalex
Third	(Spain) Fermín Aldeguer	Boscoscuro

Moto3
Pole position
Rider	(Colombia) David Alonso	CFMoto
Time	2:14.292	
Fastest lap
Rider	(Spain) Daniel Holgado	Gas Gas
Time	2:14.866 on lap 9	
Podium
First	(Colombia) David Alonso	CFMoto
Second	(Spain) Daniel Holgado	Gas Gas
Third	(Spain) Ángel Piqueras	Honda

The 2024 Motorcycle Grand Prix of the Americas (officially known as the Red Bull Grand Prix of the Americas) was the third round of the 2024 Grand Prix motorcycle racing season. It was held at the Circuit of the Americas in Austin, Texas on April 14, 2024.

== Practice session ==
=== MotoGP ===
==== Combined Free Practice 1-2 ====
Fastest session lap

Pos.	No.	Biker	Constructor	Team	Free practice times	
Pos.	No.	Biker	Constructor	Team	P1	P2
1	31	(Spain) Pedro Acosta	KTM	Red Bull GASGAS Tech3	2:03.606	**2:02.243**
2	1	(Italy) Francesco Bagnaia	Ducati	Ducati Lenovo Team	2:04.242	2:02.414
3	93	(Spain) Marc Márquez	Ducati	Gresini Racing MotoGP	2:04.003	2:02.440
4	12	(Spain) Maverick Viñales	Aprilia	Aprilia Racing	**2:03.294**	2:02.556
5	73	(Spain) Álex Márquez	Ducati	Gresini Racing MotoGP	2:03.443	2:02.605
6	89	(Spain) Jorge Martín	Ducati	Prima Pramac Racing	2:03.443	2:02.607
7	41	(Spain) Aleix Espargaró	Aprilia	Aprilia Racing	2:04.813	2:02.681
8	21	(Italy) Franco Morbidelli	Ducati	Prima Pramac Racing	2:03.904	2:02.780
9	25	(Spain) Raúl Fernández	Aprilia	Trackhouse Racing	2:04.272	2:02.807
10	72	(Italy) Marco Bezzecchi	Ducati	Pertamina Enduro VR46 MotoGP Team	2:03.812	2:02.829
11	43	(Australia) Jack Miller	KTM	Red Bull KTM Factory Racing	2:04.210	2:02.854
12	88	(Portugal) Miguel Oliveira	Aprilia	Trackhouse Racing	2:04.514	2:02.955
13	49	(Italy) Fabio Di Giannantonio	Ducati	Pertamina Enduro VR46 MotoGP Team	2:04.226	2:02.985
14	23	(Italy) Enea Bastianini	Ducati	Ducati Lenovo Team	2:03.700	2:03.063
15	33	(South Africa) Brad Binder	KTM	Red Bull KTM Factory Racing	2:03.865	2:03.303
16	20	(France) Fabio Quartararo	Yamaha	Monster Energy Yamaha MotoGP	2:04.311	2:03.322
17	42	(Spain) Álex Rins	Yamaha	Monster Energy Yamaha MotoGP	2:04.305	2:03.385
18	37	(Spain) Augusto Fernández	KTM	Red Bull GASGAS Tech3	2:04.559	2:03.503
19	36	(Spain) Joan Mir	Honda	Repsol Honda Team	2:04.435	2:03.603
20	30	(Japan) Takaaki Nakagami	Honda	IDEMITSU Honda LCR	2:05.372	2:03.742
21	10	(Italy) Luca Marini	Honda	Repsol Honda Team	2:04.402	2:04.245
22	5	(France) Johann Zarco	Honda	CASTROL Honda LCR	2:05.345	2:04.269
OFFICIAL MOTOGP COMBINED PRACTICE TIMES REPORT

==== Practice ====
The top ten riders (written in bold) qualified for Q2.

Pos.	No.	Biker	Constructor	Team	
Pos.	No.	Biker	Constructor	Team	Time results
1	89	**(Spain) Jorge Martín**	**Ducati**	**Prima Pramac Racing**	2:01.397
2	12	**(Spain) Maverick Viñales**	**Aprilia**	**Aprilia Racing**	2:01.473
3	93	**(Spain) Marc Márquez**	**Ducati**	**Gresini Racing MotoGP**	2:01.806
4	1	**(Italy) Francesco Bagnaia**	**Ducati**	**Ducati Lenovo Team**	2:01.808
5	31	(Spain) **Pedro Acosta**	**KTM**	**Red Bull GASGAS Tech3**	2:01.966
6	41	(Spain) **Aleix Espargaró**	**Aprilia**	**Aprilia Racing**	2:02.024
7	21	(Italy) **Franco Morbidelli**	**Ducati**	**Prima Pramac Racing**	2:02.103
8	23	**(Italy) Enea Bastianini**	**Ducati**	**Ducati Lenovo Team**	2:02.144
9	49	(Italy) **Fabio Di Giannantonio**	**Ducati**	**Pertamina Enduro VR46 MotoGP Team**	2:02.244
10	72	**(Italy) Marco Bezzecchi**	**Ducati**	**Pertamina Enduro VR46 MotoGP Team**	2:02.358
11	88	(Portugal) Miguel Oliveira	Aprilia	Trackhouse Racing	2:02.466
12	25	(Spain) Raúl Fernández	Aprilia	Trackhouse Racing	2:02.476
13	73	(Spain) Álex Márquez	Ducati	Gresini Racing MotoGP	2:02.493
14	33	(South Africa) Brad Binder	KTM	Red Bull KTM Factory Racing	2:02.551
15	37	(Spain) Augusto Fernández	KTM	Red Bull GASGAS Tech3	2:02.553
16	43	(Australia) Jack Miller	KTM	Red Bull KTM Factory Racing	2:02.802
17	20	(France) Fabio Quartararo	Yamaha	Monster Energy Yamaha MotoGP	2:02.839
18	42	(Spain) Álex Rins	Yamaha	Monster Energy Yamaha MotoGP	1:38.560
19	5	(France) Johann Zarco	Honda	CASTROL Honda LCR	2:03.014
20	36	(Spain) Joan Mir	Honda	Repsol Honda Team	2:03.444
21	10	(Italy) Luca Marini	Honda	Repsol Honda Team	2:03.521
22	30	(Japan) Takaaki Nakagami	Honda	IDEMITSU Honda LCR	2:03.984
OFFICIAL MOTOGP PRACTICE TIMES REPORT

=== Moto2 ===
==== Free practice ====
Pos.	No.	Biker	Team	Constructor	
Pos.	No.	Biker	Team	Constructor	Time results
1	79	(Japan) Ai Ogura	MT Helmets - MSI	Boscoscuro	**2:09.218**
2	16	(United States) Joe Roberts	OnlyFans American Racing Team	Kalex	2:09.279
3	21	(Spain) Alonso López	Beta Tools SpeedUp	Boscoscuro	2:09.359
4	13	(Italy) Celestino Vietti	Red Bull KTM Ajo	Kalex	2:09.631
5	3	(Spain) Sergio García	MT Helmets - MSI	Boscoscuro	2:09.723
6	96	(United Kingdom) Jake Dixon	CFMOTO Asterius Aspar Team	Kalex	2:09.767
7	44	(Spain) Arón Canet	Fantic Racing	Kalex	2:09.956
8	71	(Italy) Dennis Foggia	Italtrans Racing Team	Kalex	2:10.004
9	24	(Spain) Marcos Ramírez	OnlyFans American Racing Team	Kalex	2:10.062
10	35	(Thailand) Somkiat Chantra	IDEMITSU Honda Team Asia	Kalex	2:10.100
11	64	(Netherlands) Bo Bendsneyder	Pertamina Mandalika GAS UP Team	Kalex	2:10.115
12	28	(Spain) Izan Guevara	CFMOTO Asterius Aspar Team	Kalex	2:10.154
13	14	(Italy) Tony Arbolino	Elf Marc VDS Racing Team	Kalex	2:10.184
14	53	(Turkey) Deniz Öncü	Red Bull KTM Ajo	Kalex	2:10.210
15	18	(Spain) Manuel González	QJMOTOR Gresini Moto2	Kalex	2:10.319
16	52	(Spain) Jeremy Alcoba	Yamaha VR46 Master Camp Team	Kalex	2:10.347
17	54	(Spain) Fermin Aldeguer	Beta Tools SpeedUp	Boscoscuro	2:10.406
18	10	(Brazil) Diogo Moreira	Italtrans Racing Team	Kalex	2:10.510
19	15	(South Africa) Darryn Binder	Liqui Moly Husqvarna Intact GP	Kalex	2:10.601
21	81	(Australia) Senna Agius	Liqui Moly Husqvarna Intact GP	Kalex	2:10.966
22	75	(Spain) Albert Arenas	QJMOTOR Gresini Moto2	Kalex	2:10.969
23	7	(Belgium) Barry Baltus	RW-Idrofoglia Racing GP	Kalex	2:11.350
24	5	(Spain) Jaume Masià	Pertamina Mandalika GAS UP Team	Kalex	2:11.506
25	84	(Netherlands) Zonta van den Goorbergh	RW-Idrofoglia Racing GP	Kalex	2:11.567
26	34	(Indonesia) Mario Aji	IDEMITSU Honda Team Asia	Kalex	2:12.392
27	43	(Spain) Xavier Artigas	KLINT Forward Factory Team	Forward Racing	2:12.835
28	20	(Andorra) Xavi Cardelús	Fantic Racing	Kalex	2:12.938
29	11	(Spain) Álex Escrig	KLINT Forward Factory Team	Forward Racing	2:14.092
OFFICIAL MOTO2 FREE PRACTICE TIMES REPORT

- Ayumu Sasaki missed the Moto2 Grand Prix due to double arm pump surgery.

==== Combined Practice 1-2 ====
The top fourteen riders (written in bold) qualified for Q2.

Fastest session lap

Pos.	No.	Biker	Team	Constructor	Free practice times	
Pos.	No.	Biker	Team	Constructor	P1	P2
1	54	(Spain) **Fermin Aldeguer**	**Beta Tools SpeedUp**	**Boscoscuro**	**2:08.359**	**2:07.543**
2	79	(Japan) **Ai Ogura**	**MT Helmets - MSI**	**Boscoscuro**	2:09.067	2:07.569
3	96	(United Kingdom) **Jake Dixon**	**CFMOTO Asterius Aspar Team**	**Kalex**	2:08.865	2:07.751
4	24	(Spain) **Marcos Ramírez**	**OnlyFans American Racing Team**	**Kalex**	2:08.783	2:07.766
5	16	(United States) **Joe Roberts**	**OnlyFans American Racing Team**	**Kalex**	2:09.263	2:07.889
6	21	(Spain) **Alonso López**	**Beta Tools SpeedUp**	**Boscoscuro**	2:09.044	2:07.900
7	18	(Spain) **Manuel González**	**QJMOTOR Gresini Moto2**	**Kalex**	2:09.286	2:07.931
8	52	(Spain) **Jeremy Alcoba**	**Yamaha VR46 Master Camp Team**	**Kalex**	2:09.132	2:07.998
9	44	(Spain) **Arón Canet**	**Fantic Racing**	**Kalex**	2:09.127	2:08.027
10	3	(Spain) **Sergio García**	**MT Helmets - MSI**	**Boscoscuro**	2:08.641	2:08.059
11	7	(Belgium) **Barry Baltus**	**RW-Idrofoglia Racing GP**	**Kalex**	2:08.894	2:08.129
12	71	(Italy) **Dennis Foggia**	**Italtrans Racing Team**	**Kalex**	2:08.729	2:08.134
13	14	(Italy) **Tony Arbolino**	**Elf Marc VDS Racing Team**	**Kalex**	2:09.711	2:08.175
14	64	(Netherlands) **Bo Bendsneyder**	**Pertamina Mandalika GAS UP Team**	**Kalex**	2:09.208	2:08.179
15	10	(Brazil) Diogo Moreira	Italtrans Racing Team	Kalex	2:09.369	2:08.298
16	13	(Italy) Celestino Vietti	Red Bull KTM Ajo	Kalex	2:09.006	2:08.325
17	75	(Spain) Albert Arenas	QJMOTOR Gresini Moto2	Kalex	2:09.621	2:08.451
18	35	(Thailand) Somkiat Chantra	IDEMITSU Honda Team Asia	Kalex	2:09.505	2:08.564
19	84	(Netherlands) Zonta van den Goorbergh	RW-Idrofoglia Racing GP	Kalex	2:09.712	2:08.630
20	53	(Turkey) Deniz Öncü	Red Bull KTM Ajo	Kalex	2:10.401	2:08.646
21	5	(Spain) Jaume Masià	Pertamina Mandalika GAS UP Team	Kalex	2:09.535	2:08.652
22	12	(Czech Republic) Filip Salac	Elf Marc VDS Racing Team	Kalex	2:09.171	2:08.698
23	15	(South Africa) Darryn Binder	Liqui Moly Husqvarna Intact GP	Kalex	2:09.569	2:08.733
24	28	(Spain) Izan Guevara	CFMOTO Asterius Aspar Team	Kalex	2:09.709	2:09.083
25	81	(Australia) Senna Agius	Liqui Moly Husqvarna Intact GP	Kalex	2:10.476	2:09.177
26	43	(Spain) Xavier Artigas	KLINT Forward Factory Team	Forward Racing	2:11.151	2:09.748
27	11	(Spain) Álex Escrig	KLINT Forward Factory Team	Forward Racing	2:10.948	2:09.929
28	34	(Indonesia) Mario Aji	IDEMITSU Honda Team Asia	Kalex	2:10.337	2:10.263
29	20	(Andorra) Xavi Cardelús	Fantic Racing	Kalex	2:11.891	2:10.542
OFFICIAL MOTO2 PRACTICE TIMES REPORT

=== Moto3 ===
==== Free practice ====
Fastest session lap

Pos.	No.	Biker	Team	Constructor	
Pos.	No.	Biker	Team	Constructor	Time results
1	80	(Colombia) David Alonso	CFMOTO Valresa Aspar Team	CFMoto	**2:16.537**
2	96	(Spain) Daniel Holgado	Red Bull GASGAS Tech3	Gas Gas	2:16.719
3	99	(Spain) José Antonio Rueda	Red Bull KTM Ajo	KTM	2:16.760
4	64	(Spain) David Muñoz	BOE Motorsports	KTM	2:16.779
5	95	(Netherlands) Collin Veijer	Liqui Moly Husqvarna Intact GP	Husqvarna	2:17.171
6	18	(Italy) Matteo Bertelle	Rivacold Snipers Team	Honda	2:17.260
7	31	(Italy) Adrián Fernández	Leopard Racing	Honda	2:17.356
8	36	(Spain) Ángel Piqueras	Leopard Racing	Honda	2:17.361
9	48	(Spain) Iván Ortolá	MT Helmets - MSI	KTM	2:17.420
10	24	(Japan) Tatsuki Suzuki	Liqui Moly Husqvarna Intact GP	Husqvarna	2:17.434
11	82	(Italy) Stefano Nepa	LEVELUP - MTA	KTM	2:17.598
12	72	(Japan) Taiyo Furusato	Honda Team Asia	Honda	2:17.614
13	7	(Italy) Filippo Farioli	SIC58 Squadra Corse	Honda	2:17.641
14	6	(Japan) Ryusei Yamanaka	MT Helmets - MSI	KTM	2:17.662
15	66	(Australia) Joel Kelso	BOE Motorsports	KTM	2:17.757
16	78	(Spain) Joel Esteban	CFMOTO Valresa Aspar Team	CFMoto	2:17.757
17	19	(United Kingdom) Scott Ogden	MLav Racing	Honda	2:17.818
18	22	(Spain) David Almansa	Rivacold Snipers Team	Honda	2:18.191
19	58	(Italy) Luca Lunetta	SIC58 Squadra Corse	Honda	2:18.434
20	12	(Australia) Jacob Roulstone	Red Bull GASGAS Tech3	Gas Gas	2:18.885
21	85	(Spain) Xabi Zurutuza	Red Bull KTM Ajo	KTM	2:18.947
22	70	(United Kingdom) Joshua Whatley	MLav Racing	Honda	2:19.143
23	10	(Italy) Nicola Carraro	LEVELUP - MTA	KTM	2:19.336
24	5	(Thailand) Tatchakorn Buasri	Honda Team Asia	Honda	2:19.516
25	55	(Switzerland) Noah Dettwiler	CIP Green Power	KTM	2:19.596
26	54	(Italy) Riccardo Rossi	CIP Green Power	KTM	2:19.713
OFFICIAL MOTO3 FREE PRACTICE TIMES REPORT

==== Practice ====
The top fourteen riders (written in bold) qualified for Q2.

Fastest session lap

Pos.	No.	Biker	Team	Constructor	Free practice times	
Pos.	No.	Biker	Team	Constructor	P1	P2
1	80	(Colombia) **David Alonso**	**CFMOTO Valresa Aspar Team**	**CFMoto**	**2:15.173**	**2:14.153**
2	66	(Australia) **Joel Kelso**	**BOE Motorsports**	**KTM**	2:15.767	2:14.537
3	48	(Spain) **Iván Ortolá**	**MT Helmets - MSI**	**KTM**	2:15.606	2:14.537
4	96	(Spain) **Daniel Holgado**	**Red Bull GASGAS Tech3**	**Gas Gas**	2:15.567	2:14.583
5	64	(Spain) **David Muñoz**	**BOE Motorsports**	**KTM**	2:15.987	2:14.594
6	36	(Spain) **Ángel Piqueras**	**Leopard Racing**	**Honda**	2:15.490	2:14.713
7	99	(Spain) **José Antonio Rueda**	**Red Bull KTM Ajo**	**KTM**	2:15.330	2:14.720
8	24	(Japan) **Tatsuki Suzuki**	**Liqui Moly Husqvarna Intact GP**	**Husqvarna**	2:16.448	2:14.766
9	18	(Italy) **Matteo Bertelle**	**Rivacold Snipers Team**	**Honda**	2:16.206	2:14.883
10	72	(Japan) **Taiyo Furusato**	**Honda Team Asia**	**Honda**	2:16.092	2:14.941
11	7	(Italy) **Filippo Farioli**	**SIC58 Squadra Corse**	**Honda**	2:16.570	2:15.022
12	19	(United Kingdom) **Scott Ogden**	**MLav Racing**	**Honda**	2:16.377	2:15.050
13	95	(Netherlands) **Collin Veijer**	**Liqui Moly Husqvarna Intact GP**	**Husqvarna**	2:16.496	2:15.056
14	82	(Italy) **Stefano Nepa**	**LEVELUP - MTA**	**KTM**	2:16.135	2:15.078
15	31	(Italy) Adrián Fernández	Leopard Racing	Honda	2:16.393	2:15.166
16	6	(Japan) Ryusei Yamanaka	MT Helmets - MSI	KTM	2:16.218	2:15.169
17	22	(Spain) David Almansa	Rivacold Snipers Team	Honda	2:16.381	2:15.177
18	78	(Spain) Joel Esteban	CFMOTO Valresa Aspar Team	CFMoto	2:16.610	2:15.212
19	10	(Italy) Nicola Carraro	LEVELUP - MTA	KTM	2:16.808	2:15.222
20	58	(Italy) Luca Lunetta	SIC58 Squadra Corse	Honda	2:16.484	2:15.353
21	54	(Italy) Riccardo Rossi	CIP Green Power	KTM	2:17.323	2:15.411
22	12	(Australia) Jacob Roulstone	Red Bull GASGAS Tech3	Gas Gas	2:15.987	2:15.498
23	70	(United Kingdom) Joshua Whatley	MLav Racing	Honda	2:17.818	2:15.779
24	85	(Spain) Xabi Zurutuza	Red Bull KTM Ajo	KTM	2:16.953	2:15.839
25	55	(Switzerland) Noah Dettwiler	CIP Green Power	KTM	2:18.376	2:16.241
26	5	(Thailand) Tatchakorn Buasri	Honda Team Asia	Honda	2:18.633	No time
OFFICIAL MOTO3 COMBINED PRACTICE TIMES REPORT

== Qualifying ==
=== MotoGP ===
Fastest session lap

Pos.	No.	Biker	Constructor	Team	Qualifying times		Final grid	Row
Pos.	No.	Biker	Constructor	Team	Q1	Q2	Final grid	Row
1	12	(Spain) Maverick Viñales	Aprilia	Aprilia Racing	Qualified in Q2	2:00.864	1	1
2	31	(Spain) Pedro Acosta	KTM	Red Bull GASGAS Tech3	Qualified in Q2	2:01.192	2	1
3	93	(Spain) Marc Márquez	Ducati	Gresini Racing MotoGP	Qualified in Q2	2:01.266	3	1
4	1	(Italy) Francesco Bagnaia	Ducati	Ducati Lenovo Team	Qualified in Q2	2:01.352	4	2
5	23	(Italy) Enea Bastianini	Ducati	Ducati Lenovo Team	Qualified in Q2	2:01.439	5	2
6	89	(Spain) Jorge Martín	Ducati	Prima Pramac Racing	Qualified in Q2	2:01.511	6	2
7	41	(Spain) Aleix Espargaró	Aprilia	Aprilia Racing	Qualified in Q2	2:01.562	7	3
8	49	(Italy) Fabio Di Giannantonio	Ducati	Pertamina Enduro VR46 MotoGP Team	Qualified in Q2	2:01.667	8	3
9	21	(Italy) Franco Morbidelli	Ducati	Prima Pramac Racing	Qualified in Q2	2:01.737	9	3
10	72	(Italy) Marco Bezzecchi	Ducati	Pertamina Enduro VR46 MotoGP Team	Qualified in Q2	2:02.279	10	4
11	43	(Australia) Jack Miller	KTM	Red Bull KTM Factory Racing	2:01.541	2:02.297	11	4
12	73	(Spain) Álex Márquez	Ducati	Gresini Racing MotoGP	2:01.553	No time	12	4
13	25	(Spain) Raúl Fernández	Aprilia	Trackhouse Racing	2:01.726	N/A	13	5
14	88	(Portugal) Miguel Oliveira	Aprilia	Trackhouse Racing	2:01.844	N/A	14	5
15	42	(Spain) Álex Rins	Yamaha	Monster Energy Yamaha MotoGP	2:01.893	N/A	15	5
16	20	(France) Fabio Quartararo	Yamaha	Monster Energy Yamaha MotoGP	2:02.089	N/A	16	6
17	33	(South Africa) Brad Binder	KTM	Red Bull KTM Factory Racing	2:02.140	N/A	17	6
18	37	(Spain) Augusto Fernández	KTM	Red Bull GASGAS Tech3	2:02.223	N/A	18	6
19	5	(France) Johann Zarco	Honda	CASTROL Honda LCR	2:02.380	N/A	19	7
20	36	(Spain) Joan Mir	Honda	Repsol Honda Team	2:02.829	N/A	20	7
21	30	(Japan) Takaaki Nakagami	Honda	IDEMITSU Honda LCR	2:03.114	N/A	21	7
22	10	(Italy) Luca Marini	Honda	Repsol Honda Team	2:03.249	N/A	22	8
OFFICIAL MOTOGP QUALIFYING TIMES REPORT

=== Moto2 ===
Fastest session lap

Pos.	No.	Biker	Team	Constructor	Qualifying times		Final grid	Row
Pos.	No.	Biker	Team	Constructor	P1	P2	Final grid	Row
1	44	(Spain) Arón Canet	Fantic Racing	Kalex	Qualified in Q2	2:07.631	1	1
2	54	(Spain) Fermin Aldeguer	Beta Tools SpeedUp	Boscoscuro	Qualified in Q2	2:07.740	2	1
3	3	(Spain) Sergio García	MT Helmets - MSI	Boscoscuro	Qualified in Q2	2:07.819	3	1
4	75	(Spain) Albert Arenas	QJMOTOR Gresini Moto2	Kalex	2:08.279	2:07.865	4	2
5	16	(United States) Joe Roberts	OnlyFans American Racing Team	Kalex	Qualified in Q2	2:07.868	5	2
6	24	(Spain) Marcos Ramírez	OnlyFans American Racing Team	Kalex	Qualified in Q2	2:08.074	6	2
7	71	(Italy) Dennis Foggia	Italtrans Racing Team	Kalex	Qualified in Q2	2:08.031	7	
8	21	(Spain) Alonso López	Beta Tools SpeedUp	Boscoscuro	Qualified in Q2	2:08.063	8	
9	18	(Spain) Manuel González	QJMOTOR Gresini Moto2	Kalex	Qualified in Q2	2:08.074	9	
10	64	(Netherlands) Bo Bendsneyder	Pertamina Mandalika GAS UP Team	Kalex	Qualified in Q2	2:08.112	10	4
11	14	(Italy) Tony Arbolino	Elf Marc VDS Racing Team	Kalex	Qualified in Q2	2:08.127	11	4
12	7	(Belgium) Barry Baltus	RW-Idrofoglia Racing GP	Kalex	Qualified in Q2	2:08.142	12	4
13	52	(Spain) Jeremy Alcoba	Yamaha VR46 Master Camp Team	Kalex	Qualified in Q2	2:08.147	13	5
14	96	(United Kingdom) Jake Dixon	CFMOTO Asterius Aspar Team	Kalex	Qualified in Q2	2:08.281	14	5
15	13	(Italy) Celestino Vietti	Red Bull KTM Ajo	Kalex	2:07.797	2:08.311	15	5
16	10	(Brazil) Diogo Moreira	Italtrans Racing Team	Kalex	2:08.470	2:08.365	16	6
17	79	(Japan) Ai Ogura	MT Helmets - MSI	Boscoscuro	Qualified in Q2	2:08.461	17	6
18	5	(Spain) Jaume Masià	Pertamina Mandalika GAS UP Team	Kalex	2:08.274	2:08.512	18	6
19	35	(Thailand) Somkiat Chantra	IDEMITSU Honda Team Asia	Kalex	2:08.479	N/A	19	7
20	12	(Czech Republic) Filip Salač	Elf Marc VDS Racing Team	Kalex	2:08.599	N/A	20	7
21	53	(Turkey) Deniz Öncü	Red Bull KTM Ajo	Kalex	2:08.601	N/A	21	7
22	81	(Australia) Senna Agius	Liqui Moly Husqvarna Intact GP	Kalex	2:08.617	N/A	22	8
23	28	(Spain) Izan Guevara	CFMOTO Asterius Aspar Team	Kalex	2:08.870	N/A	23	8
24	84	(Netherlands) Zonta van den Goorbergh	RW-Idrofoglia Racing GP	Kalex	2:08.930	N/A	24	8
25	34	(Indonesia) Mario Aji	IDEMITSU Honda Team Asia	Kalex	2:09.419	N/A	25	9
26	43	(Spain) Xavier Artigas	KLINT Forward Factory Team	Forward Racing	2:10.408	N/A	26	9
27	20	(Andorra) Xavi Cardelús	Fantic Racing	Kalex	2:10.735	N/A	27	9
28	11	(Spain) Álex Escrig	KLINT Forward Factory Team	Forward Racing	2:11.109	N/A	28	10
29	15	(South Africa) Darryn Binder	Liqui Moly Husqvarna Intact GP	Kalex	N/A	N/A	29	10
OFFICIAL MOTO2 QUALIFYING TIMES REPORT

=== Moto3 ===
Fastest session lap

Pos.	No.	Biker	Team	Constructor	Qualifying times		Final grid	Row
Pos.	No.	Biker	Team	Constructor	P1	P2	Final grid	Row
1	80	(Colombia) David Alonso	CFMOTO Gaviota Aspar Team	CFMoto	Qualified in Q2	2:14.292	1	1
2	99	(Spain) José Antonio Rueda	Red Bull KTM Ajo	KTM	Qualified in Q2	2:14.309		
3	96	(Spain) Daniel Holgado	Red Bull GASGAS Tech3	Gas Gas	Qualified in Q2	2:14.487	2	1
4	95	(Netherlands) Collin Veijer	Liqui Moly Husqvarna Intact GP	Husqvarna	Qualified in Q2	2:14.574	3	1
5	66	(Australia) Joel Kelso	BOE Motorsports	KTM	Qualified in Q2	2:14.800	4	2
6	12	(Australia) Jacob Roulstone	Red Bull GASGAS Tech3	Gas Gas	2:15.428	2:14.869	5	2
7	18	(Italy) Matteo Bertelle	Rivacold Snipers Team	Honda	Qualified in Q2	2:14.918	6	2
8	64	(Spain) David Muñoz	BOE Motorsports	KTM	Qualified in Q2	2:15.015	7	3
9	82	(Italy) Stefano Nepa	LEVELUP - MTA	KTM	Qualified in Q2	2:15.164	8	3
10	72	(Japan) Taiyo Furusato	Honda Team Asia	Honda	Qualified in Q2	2:15.192	9	3
11	58	(Italy) Luca Lunetta	SIC58 Squadra Corse	Honda	2:16.666	2:15.223	10	4
12	31	(Italy) Adrián Fernández	Leopard Racing	Honda	2:15.271	2:15.271	11	4
13	7	(Italy) Filippo Farioli	SIC58 Squadra Corse	Honda	Qualified in Q2	2:15.282	12	4
14	48	(Spain) Iván Ortolá	MT Helmets - MSI	KTM	Qualified in Q2	2:15.433	13	5
15	19	(United Kingdom) Scott Ogden	MLav Racing	Honda	Qualified in Q2	2:15.460	14	5
16	24	(Japan) Tatsuki Suzuki	Liqui Moly Husqvarna Intact GP	Husqvarna	Qualified in Q2	2:15.738	15	5
17	78	(Spain) Joel Esteban	CFMOTO Valresa Aspar Team	CFMoto	2:16.441	2:16.232	16	6
18	36	(Spain) Ángel Piqueras	Leopard Racing	Honda	Qualified in Q2	N/A	17	6
19	70	(United Kingdom) Joshua Whatley	MLav Racing	Honda	2:16.877	N/A	18	6
20	10	(Italy) Nicola Carraro	LEVELUP - MTA	KTM	2:17.052	N/A	19	7
21	54	(Italy) Riccardo Rossi	CIP Green Power	KTM	2:17.200	N/A	20	7
22	55	(Switzerland) Noah Dettwiler	CIP Green Power	KTM	2:17.563	N/A	21	7
23	85	(Spain) Xabi Zurutuza	Red Bull KTM Ajo	KTM	2:17.818	N/A	22	8
24	6	(Japan) Ryusei Yamanaka	MT Helmets - MSI	KTM	2:20.595	N/A	23	8
25	22	(Spain) David Almansa	Rivacold Snipers Team	Honda	N/A	N/A		
26	5	(Thailand) Tatchakorn Buasri	Honda Team Asia	Honda	N/A	N/A		
OFFICIAL MOTO3 QUALIFYING TIMES REPORT

== MotoGP Sprint ==
The MotoGP Sprint was held on April 13.

Pos.	No.	Rider	Team	Constructor	Laps	Time/Retired	Grid	Points
1	12	(Spain) Maverick Viñales	Aprilia Racing	Aprilia	10	20:27.825	1	12
2	93	(Spain) Marc Márquez	Gresini Racing MotoGP	Ducati	10	+2.294	3	9
3	89	(Spain) Jorge Martín	Prima Pramac Racing	Ducati	10	+4.399	6	7
4	31	(Spain) Pedro Acosta	Red Bull GasGas Tech3	KTM	10	+6.480	2	6
5	41	(Spain) Aleix Espargaró	Aprilia Racing	Aprilia	10	+6.657	7	5
6	23	(Italy) Enea Bastianini	Ducati Lenovo Team	Ducati	10	+8.621	5	4
7	43	(Australia) Jack Miller	Red Bull KTM Factory Racing	KTM	10	+9.237	11	3
8	1	(Italy) Francesco Bagnaia	Ducati Lenovo Team	Ducati	10	+9.349	4	2
9	25	(Spain) Raúl Fernández	Trackhouse Racing	Aprilia	10	+9.637	13	1
10	21	(Italy) Franco Morbidelli	Prima Pramac Racing	Ducati	10	+9.894	9	
11	88	(Portugal) Miguel Oliveira	Trackhouse Racing	Aprilia	10	+10.364	14	
12	33	(South Africa) Brad Binder	Red Bull KTM Factory Racing	KTM	10	+10.724	17	
13	72	(Italy) Marco Bezzecchi	Pertamina Enduro VR46 Racing Team	Ducati	10	+11.549	10	
14	73	(Spain) Álex Márquez	Gresini Racing MotoGP	Ducati	10	+15.468	12	
15	20	(France) Fabio Quartararo	Monster Energy Yamaha MotoGP Team	Yamaha	10	+15.574	16	
16	42	(Spain) Álex Rins	Monster Energy Yamaha MotoGP Team	Yamaha	10	+18.146	15	
17	10	(Italy) Luca Marini	Repsol Honda Team	Honda	10	+22.989	22	
Ret	5	(France) Johann Zarco	Castrol Honda LCR	Honda	6	Accident	19	
Ret	36	(Spain) Joan Mir	Repsol Honda Team	Honda	3	Accident	20	
Ret	49	(Italy) Fabio Di Giannantonio	Pertamina Enduro VR46 Racing Team	Ducati	0	Technical problem	8	
Ret	37	(Spain) Augusto Fernández	Red Bull GasGas Tech3	KTM	0	Accident	18	
Ret	30	(Japan) Takaaki Nakagami	Idemitsu Honda LCR	Honda	0	Accident	21	
Fastest sprint lap: (Spain) Maverick Viñales (Aprilia) – 2:02.275 (lap 3)
OFFICIAL MOTOGP SPRINT REPORT

== Warm Up ==
=== Warm Up MotoGP ===
Pos.	No.	Biker	Team	Constructor	
Pos.	No.	Biker	Team	Constructor	Time results
1	12	(Spain) Maverick Viñales	Aprilia Racing	Aprilia	2:02.341
2	93	(Spain) Marc Márquez	Gresini Racing MotoGP	Ducati	2:02.517
3	25	(Spain) Raúl Fernández	Trackhouse Racing	Aprilia	2:02.795
4	89	(Spain) Jorge Martín	Prima Pramac Racing	Ducati	2:02.898
5	73	(Spain) Álex Márquez	Gresini Racing MotoGP	Ducati	2:2.919
6	31	(Spain) Pedro Acosta	Red Bull GASGAS Tech3	KTM	2:03.071
7	33	(South Africa) Brad Binder	Red Bull KTM Factory Racing	KTM	2:03.076
8	43	(Australia) Jack Miller	Red Bull KTM Factory Racing	KTM	2:03.213
9	21	(Italy) Franco Morbidelli	Prima Pramac Racing	Ducati	2:03.218
10	41	(Spain) Aleix Espargaró	Aprilia Racing	Aprilia	2:03.333
11	23	(Italy) Enea Bastianini	Ducati Lenovo Team	Ducati	2:03.340
12	88	(Portugal) Miguel Oliveira	Trackhouse Racing	Aprilia	2:03.368
13	72	(Italy) Marco Bezzecchi	Pertamina Enduro VR46 MotoGP Team	Ducati	2:03.381
14	49	(Italy) Fabio Di Giannantonio	Pertamina Enduro VR46 MotoGP Team	Ducati	2:03.389
15	1	(Italy) Francesco Bagnaia	Ducati Lenovo Team	Ducati	2:03.499
16	42	(Spain) Álex Rins	Monster Energy Yamaha MotoGP	Yamaha	2:03.515
17	30	(Japan) Takaaki Nakagami	IDEMITSU Honda LCR	Honda	2:03.648
18	20	(France) Fabio Quartararo	Monster Energy Yamaha MotoGP	Yamaha	2:03.750
19	37	(Spain) Augusto Fernández	Red Bull GASGAS Tech3	KTM	2:03.786
20	5	(France) Johann Zarco	CASTROL Honda LCR	Honda	2:03.911
21	36	(Spain) Joan Mir	Repsol Honda Team	Honda	2:03.975
22	10	(Italy) Luca Marini	Repsol Honda Team	Honda	2:04.379
OFFICIAL MOTOGP WARM UP TIMES REPORT

== Race ==
=== MotoGP ===
Pos.	No.	Rider	Team	Constructor	Laps	Time/Retired	Grid	Points
1	12	(Spain) Maverick Viñales	Aprilia Racing	Aprilia	20	41:09.503	1	25
2	31	(Spain) Pedro Acosta	Red Bull GasGas Tech3	KTM	20	+1.728	2	20
3	23	(Italy) Enea Bastianini	Ducati Lenovo Team	Ducati	20	+2.703	5	16
4	89	(Spain) Jorge Martín	Prima Pramac Racing	Ducati	20	+4.690	6	13
5	1	(Italy) Francesco Bagnaia	Ducati Lenovo Team	Ducati	20	+7.392	4	11
6	49	(Italy) Fabio Di Giannantonio	Pertamina Enduro VR46 Racing Team	Ducati	20	+9.980	8	10
7	41	(Spain) Aleix Espargaró	Aprilia Racing	Aprilia	20	+12.208	7	9
8	72	(Italy) Marco Bezzecchi	Pertamina Enduro VR46 Racing Team	Ducati	20	+13.343	10	8
9	33	(South Africa) Brad Binder	Red Bull KTM Factory Racing	KTM	20	+14.931	17	7
10	25	(Spain) Raúl Fernández	Trackhouse Racing	Aprilia	20	+16.656	13	6
11	88	(Portugal) Miguel Oliveira	Trackhouse Racing	Aprilia	20	+18.542	14	5
12	20	(France) Fabio Quartararo	Monster Energy Yamaha MotoGP Team	Yamaha	20	+22.899	16	4
13	43	(Australia) Jack Miller	Red Bull KTM Factory Racing	KTM	20	+24.011	11	3
14	37	(Spain) Augusto Fernández	Red Bull GasGas Tech3	KTM	20	+27.652	18	2
15	73	(Spain) Álex Márquez	Gresini Racing MotoGP	Ducati	20	+32.855	12	1
16	10	(Italy) Luca Marini	Repsol Honda Team	Honda	20	+33.529	22	
Ret	93	(Spain) Marc Márquez	Gresini Racing MotoGP	Ducati	10	Accident	3	
Ret	42	(Spain) Álex Rins	Monster Energy Yamaha MotoGP Team	Yamaha	10	Accident	15	
Ret	36	(Spain) Joan Mir	Repsol Honda Team	Honda	8	Accident	20	
Ret	21	(Italy) Franco Morbidelli	Prima Pramac Racing	Ducati	7	Accident	9	
Ret	30	(Japan) Takaaki Nakagami	Idemitsu Honda LCR	Honda	6	Accident	21	
Ret	5	(France) Johann Zarco	Castrol Honda LCR	Honda	6	Retired	19	
Fastest lap: (Spain) Maverick Viñales (Aprilia) – 2:02.575 (lap 14)
OFFICIAL MOTOGP RACE REPORT

=== Moto2 ===
Pos.	No.	Rider	Team	Manufacturer	Laps	Time/Retired	Grid	Points
1	3	(Spain) Sergio García	MT Helmets - MSI	Boscoscuro	16	34:25.954	3	25
2	16	(United States) Joe Roberts	OnlyFans American Racing Team	Kalex	16	+0.492	5	20
3	54	(Spain) Fermin Aldeguer	Beta Tools SpeedUp	Boscoscuro	16	+3.293	2	16
4	21	(Spain) Alonso López	Beta Tools SpeedUp	Boscoscuro	16	+6.967	8	13
5	24	(Spain) Marcos Ramírez	OnlyFans American Racing Team	Kalex	16	+7.102	6	11
6	71	(Italy) Dennis Foggia	Italtrans Racing Team	Kalex	16	+7.150	7	10
7	79	(Japan) Ai Ogura	MT Helmets - MSI	Boscoscuro	16	+9.869	17	9
8	52	(Spain) Jeremy Alcoba	Yamaha VR46 Master Camp Team	Kalex	16	+10.036	13	8
9	44	(Spain) Arón Canet	Fantic Racing	Kalex	16	+11.004	1	7
10	13	(Italy) Celestino Vietti	Red Bull KTM Ajo	Kalex	16	+12.751	15	6
11	14	(Italy) Tony Arbolino	Elf Marc VDS Racing Team	Kalex	16	+13.229	11	5
12	75	(Spain) Albert Arenas	QJMOTOR Gresini Moto2	Kalex	16	+14.734	4	4
13	18	(Spain) Manuel González	QJMOTOR Gresini Moto2	Kalex	16	+17.509	9	3
14	10	(Brazil) Diogo Moreira	Italtrans Racing Team	Kalex	16	+17.959	16	2
15	12	(Czech Republic) Filip Salač	Elf Marc VDS Racing Team	Kalex	16	+17.994	20	1
16	7	(Belgium) Barry Baltus	RW-Idrofoglia Racing GP	Kalex	16	+18.618	12	
17	81	(Australia) Senna Agius	Liqui Moly Husqvarna Intact GP	Kalex	16	+19.460	22	
18	64	(Netherlands) Bo Bendsneyder	Pertamina Mandalika GAS UP Team	Kalex	16	+26.185	10	
19	5	(Spain) Jaume Masià	Pertamina Mandalika GAS UP Team	Kalex	16	+26.272	18	
20	28	(Spain) Izan Guevara	CFMOTO Asterius Aspar Team	Kalex	16	+26.351	23	
21	35	(Thailand) Somkiat Chantra	IDEMITSU Honda Team Asia	Kalex	16	+29.786	19	
22	53	(Turkey) Deniz Öncü	Red Bull KTM Ajo	Kalex	16	+33.210	21	
23	96	(United Kingdom) Jake Dixon	CFMOTO Asterius Aspar Team	Kalex	16	+43.821	14	
24	11	(Spain) Álex Escrig	KLINT Forward Factory Team	Forward Racing	16	+44.984	28	
25	43	(Spain) Xavier Artigas	KLINT Forward Factory Team	Forward Racing	16	+45.171	26	
26	20	(Andorra) Xavi Cardelús	Fantic Racing	Kalex	16	+1:00.083	27	
27	15	(South Africa) Darryn Binder	Liqui Moly Husqvarna Intact GP	Kalex	16	+1:17.291	29	
Ret	84	(Netherlands) Zonta van den Goorbergh	RW-Idrofoglia Racing GP	Kalex	7	Technical	24	
Ret	34	(Indonesia) Mario Aji	IDEMITSU Honda Team Asia	Kalex	4	Crashed out	25	
Fastest lap: (Spain) Alonso López (Boscoscuro) - 2:08.210 (lap 6)
OFFICIAL MOTO2 RACE REPORT

=== Moto3 ===
Pos.	No.	Rider	Team	Constructor	Laps	Time/Retired	Grid	Points
1	80	(Colombia) David Alonso	CFMOTO Gaviota Aspar Team	CFMoto	14	31:38.427	1	25
2	96	(Spain) Daniel Holgado	Red Bull GASGAS Tech3	Gas Gas	14	+5.163	2	20
3	36	(Spain) Ángel Piqueras	Leopard Racing	Honda	14	+5.176	17	16
4	6	(Japan) Ryusei Yamanaka	MT Helmets - MSI	KTM	14	+5.676	23	13
5	64	(Spain) David Muñoz	BOE Motorsports	KTM	14	+13.285	7	11
6	24	(Japan) Tatsuki Suzuki	Liqui Moly Husqvarna Intact GP	Husqvarna	14	+13.730	15	10
7	66	(Australia) Joel Kelso	BOE Motorsports	KTM	14	+16.963	4	9
8	12	(Australia) Jacob Roulstone	Red Bull GASGAS Tech3	Gas Gas	14	+19.126	5	8
9	78	(Spain) Joel Esteban	CFMOTO Valresa Aspar Team	CFMoto	14	+19.325	16	4
10	18	(Italy) Matteo Bertelle	Rivacold Snipers Team	Honda	14	+20.657	6	6
11	31	(Italy) Adrián Fernández	Leopard Racing	Honda	14	+20.689	11	5
12	10	(Italy) Nicola Carraro	LEVELUP - MTA	KTM	14	+22.785	19	4
13	85	(Spain) Xabi Zurutuza	Red Bull KTM Ajo	KTM	14	+22.869	22	3
14	55	(Switzerland) Noah Dettwiler	CIP Green Power	KTM	14	+27.575	21	2
15	7	(Italy) Filippo Farioli	SIC58 Squadra Corse	Honda	14	+32.147	12	1
16	54	(Italy) Riccardo Rossi	CIP Green Power	KTM	14	+38.953	20	
17	70	(United Kingdom) Joshua Whatley	MLav Racing	Honda	14	+44.924	18	
18	82	(Italy) Stefano Nepa	LEVELUP - MTA	KTM	14	+45.075	8	
19	58	(Italy) Luca Lunetta	SIC58 Squadra Corse	Honda	14	+1:19.752	10	
Ret	95	(Netherlands) Collin Veijer	Liqui Moly Husqvarna Intact GP	Husqvarna	11	Crashed out	3	
Ret	48	(Spain) Iván Ortolá	MT Helmets - MSI	KTM	11	Ret. after crash	13	
Ret	72	(Japan) Taiyo Furusato	Honda Team Asia	Honda	3	Crashed out	9	
DSQ	19	(United Kingdom) Scott Ogden	MLav Racing	Honda	14	Black flag	14	
Fastest lap: (Spain) Daniel Holgado (Gas Gas) - 2:14.868 (lap 9)
OFFICIAL MOTO3 RACE REPORT

== Championship standings after the race ==
Below are the standings for the top five riders, constructors, and teams after the round.

=== MotoGP ===
Riders' Championship standings

	Pos.	Rider	Points
	1	(Spain) Jorge Martín	80
1	2	(Italy) Enea Bastianini	59
5	3	(Spain) Maverick Viñales	56
1	4	(Spain) Pedro Acosta	54
1	5	(Italy) Francesco Bagnaia	50

Constructors' Championship standings

Pos.	Constructor	Points
1	(Italy) Ducati	96
2	(Austria) KTM	76
3	(Italy) Aprilia	72
4	(Japan) Yamaha	19
5	(Japan) Honda	8

Teams' Championship standings

	Pos.	Team	Points
	1	(Italy) Ducati Lenovo Team	109
2	2	(Italy) Aprilia Racing	95
1	3	(Italy) Prima Pramac Racing	80
1	4	(Austria) Red Bull KTM Factory Racing	71
1	5	(France) Red Bull GasGas Tech3	61

=== Moto2 ===
Riders' Championship standings

	Pos.	Rider	Points
3	1	(Spain) Sergio García	51
	2	(United States) Joe Roberts	49
2	3	(Spain) Alonso López	38
3	4	(Spain) Arón Canet	38
1	5	(Japan) Ai Ogura	33

Constructors' Championship standings

Pos.	Constructor	Points
1	(Germany) Kalex	65
2	(Italy) Boscoscuro	63

Teams' Championship standings

	Pos.	Team	Points
	1	(Spain) MT Helmets – MSi	84
	2	(United States) OnlyFans American Racing Team	77
1	3	(Italy) Beta Tools Speed Up	67
1	4	(Italy) QJmotor Gresini Moto2	50
	5	(Italy) Fantic Racing	38

=== Moto3 ===
Riders' Championship standings

	Pos.	Rider	Points
	1	(Spain) Daniel Holgado	65
	2	(Colombia) David Alonso	63
3	3	(Australia) Joel Kelso	28
1	4	(Spain) Iván Ortolá	23
6	5	(Japan) Tatsuki Suzuki	22

Constructors' Championship standings

Pos.	Constructor	Points
1	(Spain) Gas Gas	65
2	(China) CFMoto	63
3	(Austria) KTM	46
4	(Japan) Honda	38
5	(Sweden) Husqvarna	31

Teams' Championship standings

	Pos.	Team	Points
	1	(France) Red Bull GasGas Tech3	84
	2	(Spain) CFMoto Valresa Aspar Team	83
1	3	(Spain) Boé Motorsports	46
1	4	(Germany) Liqui Moly Husqvarna Intact GP	43
	5	(Spain) MT Helmets – MSi	36

Previous race: 2024 Portuguese Grand Prix	FIM Grand Prix World Championship; 2024 season	Next race: 2024 Spanish Grand Prix
Previous race: 2023 Grand Prix of the Americas	Motorcycle Grand Prix of the Americas	Next race: 2025 Grand Prix of the Americas
