= 2024 Portuguese motorcycle Grand Prix =

Motorcycle races in Portimão

(Portugal) 2024 Portuguese Grand Prix
Race details
- Race 2 of 20 races in the 2024 Grand Prix motorcycle racing season
- Date: 23–24 March 2024
- Official name: Grande Prémio Tissot de Portugal
- Location: Autódromo Internacional do Algarve; Portimão, Algarve, Portugal
- Course: Permanent racing facility; 4.592 km (2.853 mi)

MotoGP
Pole position
Rider	(Italy) Enea Bastianini	Ducati
Time	1:37.706	
Fastest lap
Rider	(Italy) Enea Bastianini	Ducati
Time	1:38.685 on lap 21	
Podium
First	(Spain) Jorge Martín	Ducati
Second	(Italy) Enea Bastianini	Ducati
Third	(Spain) Pedro Acosta	KTM

Moto2
Pole position
Rider	(Spain) Manuel González	Kalex
Time	1:41.514	
Fastest lap
Rider	(Spain) Fermín Aldeguer	Boscoscuro
Time	1:42.221 on lap 11	
Podium
First	(Spain) Arón Canet	Kalex
Second	(United States) Joe Roberts	Kalex
Third	(Spain) Manuel González	Kalex

Moto3
Pole position
Rider	(Spain) José Antonio Rueda	KTM
Time	1:46.379	
Fastest lap
Rider	(Colombia) David Alonso	CFMoto
Time	1:46.985 on lap 6	
Podium
First	(Spain) Daniel Holgado	Gas Gas
Second	(Spain) José Antonio Rueda	KTM
Third	(Spain) Iván Ortolá	KTM

MotoE Race 1
Pole position
Rider	(Brazil) Eric Granado	Ducati
Time	1:46.470	
Fastest lap
Rider	(Italy) Alessandro Zaccone	Ducati
Time	1:46.811 on lap 3	
Podium
First	(Italy) Nicholas Spinelli	Ducati
Second	(Spain) Héctor Garzó	Ducati
Third	(Italy) Mattia Casadei	Ducati

MotoE Race 2
Pole position
Rider	(Brazil) Eric Granado	Ducati
Time	1:46.470	
Fastest lap
Rider	(Spain) Oscar Gutiérrez	Ducati
Time	1:46.313 on lap 3	
Podium
First	(Italy) Mattia Casadei	Ducati
Second	(Spain) Héctor Garzó	Ducati
Third	(Spain) Oscar Gutiérrez	Ducati

The 2024 Portuguese motorcycle Grand Prix (officially known as the Grande Prémio Tissot de Portugal) was the second round of the 2024 Grand Prix motorcycle racing season and the first round of the 2024 MotoE World Championship. All races (except for both MotoE races which were held on 23 March) were held at the Autódromo Internacional do Algarve in Portimão on 24 March 2024.

In Moto2 Filip Salac did not participate this race weekend because of "arm pump" surgery he had on 14 March 2024.

Xavier Artigas only participated in Free practice because the surgery on his right arm he had prior to the raceweekend. Jake Dixon also only participated in Free practice because of the injuries he sustained by crashing during the 2024 Qatar Grand Prix.

== Practice session ==
=== MotoGP ===
==== Combined Free Practice 1-2 ====
Fastest session lap

Pos.	No.	Biker	Team	Constructor	Free practice times	
Pos.	No.	Biker	Team	Constructor	P1	P2
1	12	(Spain) Maverick Viñales	Aprilia Racing	Aprilia	1:40.649	**1:38.720**
2	31	(Spain) Pedro Acosta	Red Bull GASGAS Tech3	KTM	1:41.606	1:39.015
3	41	(Spain) Aleix Espargaró	Aprilia Racing	Aprilia	1:41.784	1:39.208
4	93	(Spain) Marc Márquez	Gresini Racing MotoGP	Ducati	**1:40.484**	1:39.256
5	25	(Spain) Raúl Fernández	Trackhouse Racing	Aprilia	1:41.687	1:39.401
6	89	(Spain) Jorge Martín	Prima Pramac Racing	Ducati	1:40.906	1:39.444
7	1	(Italy) Francesco Bagnaia	Ducati Lenovo Team	Ducati	1:41.289	1:39.450
8	20	(France) Fabio Quartararo	Monster Energy Yamaha MotoGP	Yamaha	1:41.242	1:39.483
9	72	(Italy) Marco Bezzecchi	Pertamina Enduro VR46 MotoGP Team	Ducati	1:41.715	1:39.510
10	33	(South Africa) Brad Binder	Red Bull KTM Factory Racing	KTM	1:40.689	1:39.523
11	42	(Spain) Álex Rins	Monster Energy Yamaha MotoGP	Yamaha	1:40.934	1:39.537
12	21	(Italy) Franco Morbidelli	Prima Pramac Racing	Ducati	1:40.861	1:39.543
13	30	(Japan) Takaaki Nakagami	IDEMITSU Honda LCR	Honda	1:42.082	1:39.608
14	73	(Spain) Álex Márquez	Gresini Racing MotoGP	Ducati	1:41.119	1:39.614
15	49	(Italy) Fabio Di Giannantonio	Pertamina Enduro VR46 MotoGP Team	Ducati	1:41.277	1:39.615
16	23	(Italy) Enea Bastianini	Ducati Lenovo Team	Ducati	1:41.728	1:39.692
17	88	(Portugal) Miguel Oliveira	Trackhouse Racing	Aprilia	1:41.107	1:39.816
18	5	(France) Johann Zarco	CASTROL Honda LCR	Honda	1:41.672	1:39.872
19	43	(Australia) Jack Miller	Red Bull KTM Factory Racing	KTM	1:40.840	1:39.922
20	37	(Spain) Augusto Fernández	Red Bull GASGAS Tech3	KTM	1:41.531	1:40.083
21	36	(Spain) Joan Mir	Repsol Honda Team	Honda	1:41.190	1:40.244
22	10	(Italy) Luca Marini	Repsol Honda Team	Honda	1:41.977	1:40.494
OFFICIAL MOTOGP COMBINED PRACTICE TIMES REPORT

==== Practice ====
The top ten riders (written in bold) qualified for Q2.

Pos.	No.	Biker	Team	Constructor	
Pos.	No.	Biker	Team	Constructor	Time results
1	23	**(Italy) Enea Bastianini**	**Ducati Lenovo Team**	**Ducati**	1:38.057
2	43	**(Australia) Jack Miller**	**Red Bull KTM Factory Racing**	**KTM**	1:38.175
3	93	**(Spain) Marc Márquez**	**Gresini Racing MotoGP**	**Ducati**	1:38.210
4	89	**(Spain) Jorge Martín**	**Prima Pramac Racing**	**Ducati**	1:38.288
5	33	**(South Africa) Brad Binder**	**Red Bull KTM Factory Racing**	**KTM**	1:38.387
6	72	**(Italy) Marco Bezzecchi**	**Pertamina Enduro VR46 MotoGP Team**	**Ducati**	1:38.409
7	12	**(Spain) Maverick Viñales**	**Aprilia Racing**	**Aprilia**	1:38.411
8	1	**(Italy) Francesco Bagnaia**	**Ducati Lenovo Team**	**Ducati**	1:38.541
9	20	**(France) Fabio Quartararo**	**Monster Energy Yamaha MotoGP**	**Yamaha**	1:38.552
10	42	**(Spain) Álex Rins**	**Monster Energy Yamaha MotoGP**	**Yamaha**	1:38.560
11	31	(Spain) Pedro Acosta	Red Bull GASGAS Tech3	KTM	1:38.599
12	49	(Italy) Fabio Di Giannantonio	Pertamina Enduro VR46 MotoGP Team	Ducati	1:38.635
13	73	(Spain) Álex Márquez	Gresini Racing MotoGP	Ducati	1:38.809
14	41	(Spain) Aleix Espargaró	Aprilia Racing	Aprilia	1:38.812
15	21	(Italy) Franco Morbidelli	Prima Pramac Racing	Ducati	1:38.882
16	30	(Japan) Takaaki Nakagami	IDEMITSU Honda LCR	Honda	1:38.962
17	88	(Portugal) Miguel Oliveira	Trackhouse Racing	Aprilia	1:39.048
18	25	(Spain) Raúl Fernández	Trackhouse Racing	Aprilia	1:39.048
19	36	(Spain) Joan Mir	Repsol Honda Team	Honda	1:39.119
20	5	(France) Johann Zarco	CASTROL Honda LCR	Honda	1:39.147
21	37	(Spain) Augusto Fernández	KTM	Red Bull GASGAS Tech3	1:39.160
22	10	(Italy) Luca Marini	Repsol Honda Team	Honda	1:39.781
OFFICIAL MOTOGP PRACTICE TIMES REPORT

=== Moto2 ===
==== Free practice ====
Pos.	No.	Biker	Team	Constructor	
Pos.	No.	Biker	Team	Constructor	Time results
1	18	(Spain) Manuel González	QJMOTOR Gresini Moto2	Kalex	**1:44.900**
2	75	(Spain) Albert Arenas	QJMOTOR Gresini Moto2	Kalex	1:45.488
3	54	(Spain) Fermin Aldeguer	Beta Tools SpeedUp	Boscoscuro	1:45.598
4	35	(Thailand) Somkiat Chantra	IDEMITSU Honda Team Asia	Kalex	1:45.759
5	96	(United Kingdom) Jake Dixon	CFMOTO Aspar Team	Kalex	1:45.850
6	14	(Italy) Tony Arbolino	Elf Marc VDS Racing Team	Kalex	1:45.961
7	44	(Spain) Arón Canet	Fantic Racing	Kalex	1:46.335
8	21	(Spain) Alonso López	Beta Tools SpeedUp	Boscoscuro	1:46.689
9	13	(Italy) Celestino Vietti	Red Bull KTM Ajo	Kalex	1:46.776
10	3	(Spain) Sergio García	MT Helmets - MSI	Boscoscuro	1:46.874
11	7	(Belgium) Barry Baltus	RW-Idrofoglia Racing GP	Kalex	1:46.916
12	84	(Netherlands) Zonta van den Goorbergh	RW-Idrofoglia Racing GP	Kalex	1:46.979
13	79	(Japan) Ai Ogura	MT Helmets - MSI	Boscoscuro	1:46.980
14	16	(United States) Joe Roberts	OnlyFans American Racing Team	Kalex	1:47.182
15	24	(Spain) Marcos Ramírez	OnlyFans American Racing Team	Kalex	1:47.191
16	53	(Turkey) Deniz Öncü	Red Bull KTM Ajo	Kalex	1:47.409
17	81	(Australia) Senna Agius	Liqui Moly Husqvarna Intact GP	Kalex	1:47.422
18	5	(Spain) Jaume Masià	Pertamina Mandalika GAS UP Team	Kalex	1:47.502
19	52	(Spain) Jeremy Alcoba	Yamaha VR46 Master Camp Team	Kalex	1:47.539
20	71	(Italy) Dennis Foggia	Italtrans Racing Team	Kalex	1:48.242
21	28	(Spain) Izan Guevara	CFMOTO Inde Aspar Team	Kalex	1:48.347
22	20	(Andorra) Xavi Cardelús	Fantic Racing	Kalex	1:48.981
23	64	(Netherlands) Bo Bendsneyder	Pertamina Mandalika GAS UP Team	Kalex	1:49.228
24	10	(Brazil) Diogo Moreira	Italtrans Racing Team	Kalex	1:49.420
25	34	(Indonesia) Mario Aji	IDEMITSU Honda Team Asia	Kalex	1:49.841
26	71	(Japan) Ayumu Sasaki	Yamaha VR46 Master Camp Team	Kalex	1:50.598
27	15	(South Africa) Darryn Binder	Liqui Moly Husqvarna Intact GP	Kalex	1:51.845
28	11	(Spain) Álex Escrig	KLINT Forward Factory Team	Forward Racing	1:52.476
29	43	(Spain) Xavier Artigas	KLINT Forward Factory Team	Forward Racing	1:53.924
OFFICIAL MOTO2 FREE PRACTICE TIMES REPORT

==== Combined Practice 1-2 ====
The top fourteen riders (written in bold) qualified for Q2.

Fastest session lap

Pos.	No.	Biker	Team	Constructor	Free practice times	
Pos.	No.	Biker	Team	Constructor	P1	P2
1	18	(Spain) **Manuel González**	**QJMOTOR Gresini Moto2**	**Kalex**	1:42.559	**1:41.716**
2	14	(Italy) **Tony Arbolino**	**Elf Marc VDS Racing Team**	**Kalex**	1:42.904	1:41.831
3	21	(Spain) **Alonso López**	**Beta Tools SpeedUp**	**Boscoscuro**	**1:42.362**	1:41.883
4	54	(Spain) **Fermin Aldeguer**	**Beta Tools SpeedUp**	**Boscoscuro**	1:42.852	1:41.923
5	13	(Italy) **Celestino Vietti**	**Red Bull KTM Ajo**	**Kalex**	1:43.008	1:42.101
6	3	(Spain) **Sergio García**	**MT Helmets - MSI**	**Boscoscuro**	1:43.214	1:42.134
7	75	(Spain) **Albert Arenas**	**QJMOTOR Gresini Moto2**	**Kalex**	1:42.921	1:42.261
8	16	(United States) **Joe Roberts**	**OnlyFans American Racing Team**	**Kalex**	1:42.545	1:42.304
9	44	(Spain) **Arón Canet**	**Fantic Racing**	**Kalex**	1:42.375	1:42.336
10	71	(Italy) **Dennis Foggia**	**Italtrans Racing Team**	**Kalex**	1:43.241	1:42.376
11	52	(Spain) **Jeremy Alcoba**	**Yamaha VR46 Master Camp Team**	**Kalex**	1:43.133	1:42.395
12	7	(Belgium) **Barry Baltus**	**RW-Idrofoglia Racing GP**	**Kalex**	1:43.794	1:42.407
13	24	(Spain) **Marcos Ramírez**	**OnlyFans American Racing Team**	**Kalex**	1:42.643	1:42.433
14	64	(Netherlands) **Bo Bendsneyder**	**Pertamina Mandalika GAS UP Team**	**Kalex**	1:43.469	1:42.478
15	10	(Brazil) Diogo Moreira	Italtrans Racing Team	Kalex	1:43.695	1:42.509
16	81	(Australia) Senna Agius	Liqui Moly Husqvarna Intact GP	Kalex	1:43.485	1:42.533
17	84	(Netherlands) Zonta van den Goorbergh	RW-Idrofoglia Racing GP	Kalex	1:43.758	1:42.673
18	79	(Japan) Ai Ogura	MT Helmets - MSI	Boscoscuro	1:43.191	1:42.677
19	15	(South Africa) Darryn Binder	Liqui Moly Husqvarna Intact GP	Kalex	1:43.457	1:42.762
20	35	(Thailand) Somkiat Chantra	IDEMITSU Honda Team Asia	Kalex	1:43.303	1:42.767
21	22	(Japan) Ayumu Sasaki	Yamaha VR46 Master Camp Team	Kalex	1:44.871	1:42.894
22	5	(Spain) Jaume Masià	Pertamina Mandalika GAS UP Team	Kalex	1:43.660	1:43.001
23	28	(Spain) Izan Guevara	CFMOTO Aspar Team	Kalex	1:44.677	1:43.053
24	53	(Turkey) Deniz Öncü	Red Bull KTM Ajo	Kalex	1:44.539	1:43.141
25	34	(Indonesia) Mario Aji	IDEMITSU Honda Team Asia	Kalex	1:44.499	1:43.554
26	11	(Spain) Álex Escrig	KLINT Forward Factory Team	Forward Racing	1:44.789	1:43.639
27	20	(Andorra) Xavi Cardelús	Fantic Racing	Kalex	1:44.298	1:44.077
OFFICIAL MOTO2 PRACTICE TIMES REPORT

=== Moto3 ===
==== Free practice ====
The Free Practice session was canceled due to weather conditions.

==== Practice ====
The top fourteen riders (written in bold) qualified for Q2.

Fastest session lap

Pos.	No.	Biker	Team	Constructor	Free practice times	
Pos.	No.	Biker	Team	Constructor	P1	P2
1	66	(Australia) **Joel Kelso**	**BOE Motorsports**	**KTM**	1:47.239	**1:47.175**
2	80	(Colombia) **David Alonso**	**CFMOTO Gaviota Aspar Team**	**CFMoto**	**1:47.202**	1:47.486
3	99	(Spain) **José Antonio Rueda**	**Red Bull KTM Ajo**	**KTM**	1:47.997	1:47.322
4	31	(Italy) **Adrián Fernández**	**Leopard Racing**	**Honda**	1:48.829	1:47.683
5	54	(Italy) **Riccardo Rossi**	**CIP Green Power**	**KTM**	1:48.039	1:47.690
6	19	(United Kingdom) **Scott Ogden**	**MLav Racing**	**Honda**	1:48.347	1:47.753
7	78	(Spain) **Joel Esteban**	**CFMOTO Aspar Team**	**CFMoto**	1:48.643	1:47.839
8	12	(Australia) **Jacob Roulstone**	**Red Bull GASGAS Tech3**	**Gas Gas**	1:49.209	1:47.855
9	18	(Italy) **Matteo Bertelle**	**Rivacold Snipers Team**	**Honda**	1:47.881	1:48.460
10	48	(Spain) **Iván Ortolá**	**MT Helmets - MSI**	**KTM**	1:48.647	1:47.938
11	96	(Spain) **Daniel Holgado**	**Red Bull GASGAS Tech3**	**Gas Gas**	1:48.425	1:47.986
12	64	(Spain) **David Muñoz**	**BOE Motorsports**	**KTM**	1:49.391	1:48.112
13	95	(Netherlands) **Collin Veijer**	**Liqui Moly Husqvarna Intact GP**	**Husqvarna**	1:48.822	1:48.147
14	82	(Italy) **Stefano Nepa**	**LEVELUP - MTA**	**KTM**	1:48.510	1:48.254
15	7	(Italy) Filippo Farioli	SIC58 Squadra Corse	Honda	1:48.261	1:48.398
16	36	(Spain) Ángel Piqueras	Leopard Racing	Honda	1:48.327	1:48.733
17	58	(Italy) Luca Lunetta	SIC58 Squadra Corse	Honda	1:49.152	1:48.408
18	21	(Spain) Vicente Pérez	Red Bull KTM Ajo	KTM	1:48.792	1:48.534
19	6	(Japan) Ryusei Yamanaka	MT Helmets - MSI	KTM	1:48.644	1:48.855
20	24	(Japan) Tatsuki Suzuki	Liqui Moly Husqvarna Intact GP	Husqvarna	1:49.322	1:48.805
21	10	(Italy) Nicola Carraro	LEVELUP - MTA	KTM	1:48.984	1:48.997
22	55	(Switzerland) Noah Dettwiler	CIP Green Power	KTM	1:49.772	1:48.990
23	70	(United Kingdom) Joshua Whatley	MLav Racing	Honda	1:49.389	1:49.478
24	72	(Japan) Taiyo Furusato	Honda Team Asia	Honda	1:49.715	1:49.471
25	5	(Thailand) Tatchakorn Buasri	Honda Team Asia	Honda	1:50.305	1:49.658
26	71	(Qatar) Hamad Al Sahouti	Rivacold Snipers Team	Honda	1:54.364	1:52.287
OFFICIAL MOTO3 COMBINED PRACTICE TIMES REPORT

== Qualifying ==
=== MotoGP ===
Fastest session lap

Pos.	No.	Biker	Team	Constructor	Qualifying times		Final grid	Row
Pos.	No.	Biker	Team	Constructor	Q1	Q2	Final grid	Row
1	23	(Italy) Enea Bastianini	Ducati Lenovo Team	Ducati	Qualified in Q2	1:37.706	1	1
2	12	(Spain) Maverick Viñales	Aprilia Racing	Aprilia	Qualified in Q2	1:37.788	2	1
3	89	(Spain) Jorge Martín	Prima Pramac Racing	Ducati	Qualified in Q2	1:37.812	3	1
4	1	(Italy) Francesco Bagnaia	Ducati Lenovo Team	Ducati	Qualified in Q2	1:37.922	4	2
5	43	(Australia) Jack Miller	Red Bull KTM Factory Racing	KTM	Qualified in Q2	1:38.032	5	2
6	72	(Italy) Marco Bezzecchi	Pertamina Enduro VR46 MotoGP Team	Ducati	Qualified in Q2	1:38.072	6	2
7	31	(Spain) Pedro Acosta	Red Bull GASGAS Tech3	KTM	1:38.065	1:38.138	7	3
8	93	(Spain) Marc Márquez	Gresini Racing MotoGP	Ducati	Qualified in Q2	1:38.147	8	3
9	20	(France) Fabio Quartararo	Monster Energy Yamaha MotoGP	Yamaha	Qualified in Q2	1:38.322	9	3
10	33	(South Africa) Brad Binder	Red Bull KTM Factory Racing	KTM	Qualified in Q2	1:38.412	10	4
11	42	(Spain) Álex Rins	Monster Energy Yamaha MotoGP	Yamaha	Qualified in Q2	1:38.502	11	4
12	73	(Spain) Álex Márquez	Gresini Racing MotoGP	Ducati	1:38.060	No time	12	4
13	41	(Spain) Aleix Espargaró	Aprilia Racing	Aprilia	1:38.279	N/A	13	5
14	49	(Italy) Fabio Di Giannantonio	Pertamina Enduro VR46 MotoGP Team	Ducati	1:38.309	N/A	14	5
15	88	(Portugal) Miguel Oliveira	Trackhouse Racing	Aprilia	1:38.385	N/A	15	5
16	25	(Spain) Raúl Fernández	Trackhouse Racing	Aprilia	1:38.448	N/A	16	6
17	21	(Italy) Franco Morbidelli	Prima Pramac Racing	Ducati	1:38.454	N/A	17	6
18	37	(Spain) Augusto Fernández	Red Bull GASGAS Tech3	KTM	1:38.934	N/A	18	6
19	5	(France) Johann Zarco	CASTROL Honda LCR	Honda	1:39.004	N/A	19	7
20	36	(Spain) Joan Mir	Repsol Honda Team	Honda	1:39.025	N/A	20	7
21	30	(Japan) Takaaki Nakagami	IDEMITSU Honda LCR	Honda	1:39.058	N/A	21	7
22	10	(Italy) Luca Marini	Repsol Honda Team	Honda	1:39.451	N/A	2	8
OFFICIAL MOTOGP QUALIFYING TIMES REPORT

=== Moto2 ===
Fastest session lap

Pos.	No.	Biker	Team	Constructor	Qualifying times		Final grid	Row
Pos.	No.	Biker	Team	Constructor	P1	P2	Final grid	Row
1	18	(Spain) Manuel González	QJMOTOR Gresini Moto2	Kalex	Qualified in Q2	1:41.514	1	1
2	54	(Spain) Fermin Aldeguer	Beta Tools SpeedUp	Boscoscuro	Qualified in Q2	1:41.648	2	1
3	44	(Spain) Arón Canet	Fantic Racing	Kalex	Qualified in Q2	1:41.713	3	1
4	21	(Spain) Alonso López	Beta Tools SpeedUp	Boscoscuro	Qualified in Q2	1:41.929	4	2
5	16	(United States) Joe Roberts	OnlyFans American Racing Team	Kalex	Qualified in Q2	1:42.031	5	2
6	75	(Spain) Albert Arenas	QJMOTOR Gresini Moto2	Kalex	Qualified in Q2	1:42.070	6	2
7	79	(Japan) Ai Ogura	MT Helmets - MSI	Boscoscuro	1:42.259	1:42.143	7	3
8	3	(Spain) Sergio García	MT Helmets - MSI	Boscoscuro	Qualified in Q2	1:42.159	8	3
9	35	(Thailand) Somkiat Chantra	IDEMITSU Honda Team Asia	Kalex	1:42.064	1:42.174	9	3
10	52	(Spain) Jeremy Alcoba	Yamaha VR46 Master Camp Team	Kalex	Qualified in Q2	1:42.180	10	4
11	24	(Spain) Marcos Ramírez	OnlyFans American Racing Team	Kalex	Qualified in Q2	1:42.188	11	4
12	14	(Italy) Tony Arbolino	Elf Marc VDS Racing Team	Kalex	Qualified in Q2	1:42.188	12	4
13	81	(Australia) Senna Agius	Liqui Moly Husqvarna Intact GP	Kalex	1:42.479	1:42.191	13	5
14	13	(Italy) Celestino Vietti	Red Bull KTM Ajo	Kalex	Qualified in Q2	1:42.241	14	5
15	71	(Italy) Dennis Foggia	Italtrans Racing Team	Kalex	Qualified in Q2	1:42.320	15	5
16	7	(Belgium) Barry Baltus	RW-Idrofoglia Racing GP	Kalex	Qualified in Q2	1:42.363	16	6
17	10	(Brazil) Diogo Moreira	Italtrans Racing Team	Kalex	1:42.441	1:42.436	17	6
18	64	(Netherlands) Bo Bendsneyder	Pertamina Mandalika GAS UP Team	Kalex	Qualified in Q2	1:42.508	18	6
19	84	(Netherlands) Zonta van den Goorbergh	RW-Idrofoglia Racing GP	Kalex	1:42.531	N/A	19	7
20	15	(South Africa) Darryn Binder	Liqui Moly Husqvarna Intact GP	Kalex	1:42.676	N/A	20	7
21	71	(Japan) Ayumu Sasaki	Yamaha VR46 Master Camp Team	Kalex	1:42.710	N/A	21	7
22	28	(Spain) Izan Guevara	CFMOTO Aspar Team	Kalex	1:43.109	N/A	22	8
23	5	(Spain) Jaume Masià	Pertamina Mandalika GAS UP Team	Kalex	1:43.272	N/A	23	8
24	11	(Spain) Álex Escrig	KLINT Forward Factory Team	Forward Racing	1:43.518	N/A	24	8
25	53	(Turkey) Deniz Öncü	Red Bull KTM Ajo	Kalex	1:43.626	N/A	25	9
26	20	(Andorra) Xavi Cardelús	Fantic Racing	Kalex	1:43.852	N/A	26	9
27	34	(Indonesia) Mario Aji	IDEMITSU Honda Team Asia	Kalex	1:44.068	N/A	27	9
OFFICIAL MOTO2 QUALIFYING TIMES REPORT

=== Moto3 ===
Fastest session lap

Pos.	No.	Biker	Team	Constructor	Qualifying times		Final grid	Row
Pos.	No.	Biker	Team	Constructor	P1	P2	Final grid	Row
1	99	(Spain) José Antonio Rueda	Red Bull KTM Ajo	KTM	Qualified in Q2	1:46.379	1	1
2	66	(Australia) Joel Kelso	BOE Motorsports	KTM	Qualified in Q2	1:46.438	2	1
3	80	(Colombia) David Alonso	CFMOTO Gaviota Aspar Team	CFMoto	Qualified in Q2	1:46.497	3	1
4	96	(Spain) Daniel Holgado	Red Bull GASGAS Tech3	Gas Gas	Qualified in Q2	1:46.547	4	2
5	54	(Italy) Riccardo Rossi	CIP Green Power	KTM	Qualified in Q2	1:46.817	5	2
6	95	(Netherlands) Collin Veijer	Liqui Moly Husqvarna Intact GP	Husqvarna	Qualified in Q2	1:46.874	6	2
7	48	(Spain) Iván Ortolá	MT Helmets - MSI	KTM	Qualified in Q2	1:46.949	7	3
8	7	(Italy) Filippo Farioli	SIC58 Squadra Corse	Honda	1:48.256	1:47.030	8	3
9	19	(United Kingdom) Scott Ogden	MLav Racing	Honda	Qualified in Q2	1:47.173	9	3
10	82	(Italy) Stefano Nepa	LEVELUP - MTA	KTM	Qualified in Q2	1:47.207	10	4
11	78	(Spain) Joel Esteban	CFMOTO Gaviota Aspar Team	CFMoto	Qualified in Q2	1:47.336	11	4
12	18	(Italy) Matteo Bertelle	Rivacold Snipers Team	Honda	Qualified in Q2	1:47.366	12	4
13	64	(Spain) David Muñoz	BOE Motorsports	KTM	Qualified in Q2	1:47.394	13	5
14	12	(Australia) Jacob Roulstone	Red Bull GASGAS Tech3	Gas Gas	Qualified in Q2	1:47.463	14	5
15	31	(Italy) Adrián Fernández	Leopard Racing	Honda	Qualified in Q2	1:47.500	15	5
16	10	(Italy) Nicola Carraro	LEVELUP - MTA	KTM	1:48.104	1:47.694	16	6
17	6	(Japan) Ryusei Yamanaka	MT Helmets - MSI	KTM	1:47.979	1:47.871	17	6
18	21	(Spain) Vicente Pérez	Red Bull KTM Ajo	KTM	1:48.342	1:47.999	18	6
19	36	(Spain) Ángel Piqueras	Leopard Racing	Honda	1:48.359	N/A	19	7
20	24	(Japan) Tatsuki Suzuki	Liqui Moly Husqvarna Intact GP	Husqvarna	1:48.381	N/A	20	7
21	72	(Japan) Taiyo Furusato	Honda Team Asia	Honda	1:48.439	N/A	21	7
22	70	(United Kingdom) Joshua Whatley	MLav Racing	Honda	1:48.498	N/A	22	8
23	5	(Thailand) Tatchakorn Buasri	Honda Team Asia	Honda	1:50.313	N/A	23	8
24	71	(Qatar) Hamad Al Sahouti	Rivacold Snipers Team	Honda	1:51.625	N/A	24	8
25	58	(Italy) Luca Lunetta	SIC58 Squadra Corse	Honda	N/A	N/A	25	9
26	55	(Switzerland) Noah Dettwiler	CIP Green Power	KTM	N/A	N/A	26	9
OFFICIAL MOTO3 QUALIFYING TIMES REPORT

- Noah Dettwiler and Luca Lunetta qualified for the race having achieved a time within 107 % of the fastest rider in a free practice session.

== MotoGP Sprint ==
The MotoGP Sprint was held on 23 March.

Pos.	No.	Rider	Team	Constructor	Laps	Time/Retired	Grid	Points
1	12	(Spain) Maverick Viñales	Aprilia Racing	Aprilia	12	19:49.636	2	12
2	93	(Spain) Marc Márquez	Gresini Racing MotoGP	Ducati	12	+1.039	8	9
3	89	(Spain) Jorge Martín	Prima Pramac Racing	Ducati	12	+1.122	3	7
4	1	(Italy) Francesco Bagnaia	Ducati Lenovo Team	Ducati	12	+4.155	4	6
5	43	(Australia) Jack Miller	Red Bull KTM Factory Racing	KTM	12	+4.329	5	5
6	23	(Italy) Enea Bastianini	Ducati Lenovo Team	Ducati	12	+4.384	1	4
7	31	(Spain) Pedro Acosta	Red Bull GASGAS Tech3	KTM	12	+5.088	7	3
8	41	(Spain) Aleix Espargaró	Aprilia Racing	Aprilia	12	+6.161	13	2
9	20	(France) Fabio Quartararo	Monster Energy Yamaha MotoGP	Yamaha	12	+7.501	9	1
10	25	(Spain) Raúl Fernández	Trackhouse Racing	Aprilia	12	+8.484	16	
11	72	(Italy) Marco Bezzecchi	Pertamina Enduro VR46 MotoGP Team	Ducati	12	+9.529	6	
12	88	(Portugal) Miguel Oliveira	Trackhouse Racing	Aprilia	12	+10.519	15	
13	73	(Spain) Álex Márquez	Gresini Racing MotoGP	Ducati	12	+11.458	12	
14	36	(Spain) Joan Mir	Repsol Honda Team	Honda	12	+14.035	20	
15	37	(Spain) Augusto Fernández	Red Bull GASGAS Tech3	KTM	12	+14.853	18	
16	21	(Italy) Franco Morbidelli	Prima Pramac Racing	Ducati	12	+16.049	17	
17	30	(Japan) Takaaki Nakagami	IDEMITSU Honda LCR	Honda	12	+16.398	21	
18	10	(Italy) Luca Marini	Repsol Honda Team	Honda	12	+24.907	22	
Ret	5	(France) Johann Zarco	CASTROL Honda LCR	Honda	5	Retired	19	
Ret	33	(South Africa) Brad Binder	Red Bull KTM Factory Racing	KTM	3	Accident	10	
Ret	49	(Italy) Fabio Di Giannantonio	Pertamina Enduro VR46 MotoGP Team	Ducati	3	Accident	14	
Ret	42	(Spain) Álex Rins	Monster Energy Yamaha MotoGP	Yamaha	2	Accident	11	
Fastest sprint lap: (Spain) Jorge Martín (Ducati) – 1:38.479 (lap 7)
OFFICIAL MOTOGP SPRINT REPORT

== Warm Up ==
=== Warm Up MotoGP ===
Pos.	No.	Biker	Team	Constructor	
Pos.	No.	Biker	Team	Constructor	Time results
1	89	(Spain) Jorge Martín	Prima Pramac Racing	Ducati	1:39.093
2	23	(Italy) Enea Bastianini	Ducati Lenovo Team	Ducati	1:39.442
3	43	(Australia) Jack Miller	Red Bull KTM Factory Racing	KTM	1:39.486
4	12	(Spain) Maverick Viñales	Aprilia Racing	Aprilia	1:39.511
5	30	(Japan) Takaaki Nakagami	IDEMITSU Honda LCR	Honda	1:39.546
6	31	(Spain) Pedro Acosta	Red Bull GASGAS Tech3	KTM	1:39.550
7	33	(South Africa) Brad Binder	Red Bull KTM Factory Racing	KTM	1:39.550
8	25	(Spain) Raúl Fernández	Trackhouse Racing	Aprilia	1:39.559
9	73	(Spain) Álex Márquez	Gresini Racing MotoGP	Ducati	1:39.593
10	49	(Italy) Fabio Di Giannantonio	Pertamina Enduro VR46 MotoGP Team	Ducati	1:39.633
11	1	(Italy) Francesco Bagnaia	Ducati Lenovo Team	Ducati	1:39.644
12	21	(Italy) Franco Morbidelli	Prima Pramac Racing	Ducati	1:39.716
13	41	(Spain) Aleix Espargaró	Aprilia Racing	Aprilia	1:39.719
14	5	(France) Johann Zarco	CASTROL Honda LCR	Honda	1:39.742
15	20	(France) Fabio Quartararo	Monster Energy Yamaha MotoGP	Yamaha	1:39.785
16	42	(Spain) Álex Rins	Monster Energy Yamaha MotoGP	Yamaha	1:39.793
17	72	(Italy) Marco Bezzecchi	Pertamina Enduro VR46 MotoGP Team	Ducati	1:39.818
18	88	(Portugal) Miguel Oliveira	Trackhouse Racing	Aprilia	1:39.893
19	37	(Spain) Augusto Fernández	Red Bull GASGAS Tech3	KTM	1:39.932
20	36	(Spain) Joan Mir	Repsol Honda Team	Honda	1:39.991
21	10	(Italy) Luca Marini	Repsol Honda Team	Honda	1:40.109
22	93	(Spain) Marc Márquez	Gresini Racing MotoGP	Ducati	1:41.587
OFFICIAL MOTOGP WARM UP TIMES REPORT

== Race ==
=== MotoGP ===
Pos.	No.	Rider	Team	Constructor	Laps	Time/Retired	Grid	Points
1	89	(Spain) Jorge Martín	Prima Pramac Racing	Ducati	25	41:18.138	3	25
2	23	(Italy) Enea Bastianini	Ducati Lenovo Team	Ducati	25	+0.882	1	20
3	31	(Spain) Pedro Acosta	Red Bull GASGAS Tech3	KTM	25	+5.362	7	16
4	33	(South Africa) Brad Binder	Red Bull KTM Factory Racing	KTM	25	+11.129	10	13
5	43	(Australia) Jack Miller	Red Bull KTM Factory Racing	KTM	25	+16.437	5	11
6	72	(Italy) Marco Bezzecchi	Pertamina Enduro VR46 MotoGP Team	Ducati	25	+19.403	6	10
7	20	(France) Fabio Quartararo	Monster Energy Yamaha MotoGP	Yamaha	25	+20.130	9	9
8	41	(Spain) Aleix Espargaró	Aprilia Racing	Aprilia	25	+21.549	13	8
9	88	(Portugal) Miguel Oliveira	Trackhouse Racing	Aprilia	25	+23.929	15	7
10	49	(Italy) Fabio Di Giannantonio	Pertamina Enduro VR46 MotoGP Team	Ducati	25	+28.195	14	6
11	37	(Spain) Augusto Fernández	Red Bull GASGAS Tech3	KTM	25	+28.244	18	5
12	36	(Spain) Joan Mir	Repsol Honda Team	Honda	25	+29.271	20	4
13	42	(Spain) Álex Rins	Monster Energy Yamaha MotoGP	Yamaha	25	+31.334	11	3
14	30	(Japan) Takaaki Nakagami	IDEMITSU Honda LCR	Honda	25	+34.932	21	2
15	5	(France) Johann Zarco	CASTROL Honda LCR	Honda	25	+38.267	19	1
16	93	(Spain) Marc Márquez	Gresini Racing MotoGP	Ducati	25	+40.174	8	
17	10	(Italy) Luca Marini	Repsol Honda Team	Honda	25	+40.775	22	
18	21	(Italy) Franco Morbidelli	Prima Pramac Racing	Ducati	25	+52.362	17	
Ret	12	(Spain) Maverick Viñales	Aprilia Racing	Aprilia	24	Gearbox	2	
Ret	1	(Italy) Francesco Bagnaia	Ducati Lenovo Team	Ducati	23	Collision damage	4	
Ret	73	(Spain) Álex Márquez	Gresini Racing MotoGP	Ducati	17	Retired	12	
Ret	25	(Spain) Raúl Fernández	Trackhouse Racing	Aprilia	3	Accident	16	
Fastest lap: (Italy) Enea Bastianini (Ducati) – 1:38.685 (lap 21)
OFFICIAL MOTOGP RACE REPORT

=== Moto2 ===
Pos.	No.	Rider	Team	Constructor	Laps	Time/Retired	Grid	Points
1	44	(Spain) Arón Canet	Fantic Racing	Kalex	21	36:03.959	3	25
2	16	(United States) Joe Roberts	OnlyFans American Racing Team	Kalex	21	+2.059	5	20
3	18	(Spain) Manuel González	QJmotor Gresini Moto2	Kalex	21	+2.610	1	16
4	54	(Spain) Fermín Aldeguer	Beta Tools Speed Up	Boscoscuro	21	+3.212	2	13
5	79	(Japan) Ai Ogura	MT Helmets – MSi	Boscoscuro	21	+3.728	7	11
6	3	(Spain) Sergio García	MT Helmets – MSi	Boscoscuro	21	+6.7.16	8	10
7	13	(Italy) Celestino Vietti	Red Bull KTM Ajo	Kalex	21	+7.288	14	9
8	75	(Spain) Albert Arenas	QJmotor Gresini Moto2	Kalex	21	+7.663	6	8
9	24	(Spain) Marcos Ramírez	OnlyFans American Racing Team	Kalex	21	+7.758	11	7
10	35	(Thailand) Somkiat Chantra	Idemitsu Honda Team Asia	Kalex	21	+8.728	9	6
11	52	(Spain) Jeremy Alcoba	Yamaha VR46 Master Camp Team	Kalex	21	+8.913	10	5
12	14	(Italy) Tony Arbolino	Elf Marc VDS Racing Team	Kalex	21	+10.072	12	4
13	7	(Belgium) Barry Baltus	RW-Idrofoglia Racing GP	Kalex	21	+10.707	16	3
14	81	(Australia) Senna Agius	Liqui Moly Husqvarna Intact GP	Kalex	21	+16.739	13	2
15	15	(South Africa) Darryn Binder	Liqui Moly Husqvarna Intact GP	Kalex	21	+17.945	20	1
16	64	(Netherlands) Bo Bendsneyder	Pertamina Mandalika Gas Up Team	Kalex	21	+18.071	18	
17	71	(Italy) Dennis Foggia	Italtrans Racing	Kalex	21	+21.666	15	
18	10	(Brazil) Diogo Moreira	Italtrans Racing	Kalex	21	+21.891	17	
19	84	(Netherlands) Zonta van den Goorbergh	RW-Idrofoglia Racing GP	Kalex	21	+23.387	19	
20	53	(Turkey) Deniz Öncü	Red Bull KTM Ajo	Kalex	21	+26.523	25	
21	5	(Spain) Jaume Masià	Pertamina Mandalika Gas Up Team	Kalex	21	+33.994	23	
22	28	(Spain) Izan Guevara	CFMoto Aspar Team	Kalex	21	+41.234	22	
23	34	(Indonesia) Mario Aji	Idemitsu Honda Team Asia	Kalex	21	+41.336	27	
24	11	(Spain) Álex Escrig	Klint Forward Factory Team	Forward	21	+55.477	24	
25	21	(Spain) Alonso López	Beta Tools Speed Up	Boscoscuro	20	+1 Lap	4	
Ret	22	(Japan) Ayumu Sasaki	Yamaha VR46 Master Camp Team	Kalex	15	Accident	21	
Ret	20	(Andorra) Xavi Cardelús	Fantic Racing	Kalex	9	Accident	26	
Fastest lap: (Spain) Fermín Aldeguer (Boscoscuro) – 1:42.221 (lap 11)
OFFICIAL MOTO2 RACE REPORT

=== Moto3 ===
Pos.	No.	Rider	Team	Constructor	Laps	Time/Retired	Grid	Points
1	96	(Spain) Daniel Holgado	Red Bull GASGAS Tech3	Gas Gas	19	34:09.038	4	25
2	99	(Spain) José Antonio Rueda	Red Bull KTM Ajo	KTM	19	+0.044	1	20
3	48	(Spain) Iván Ortolá	MT Helmets - MSI	KTM	19	+0.820	7	16
4	80	(Colombia) David Alonso	CFMOTO Gaviota Aspar Team	CFMoto	19	+2.218	3	13
5	66	(Australia) Joel Kelso	BOE Motorsports	KTM	19	+2.246	2	11
6	95	(Netherlands) Collin Veijer	Liqui Moly Husqvarna Intact GP	Husqvarna	19	+2.263	6	10
7	82	(Italy) Stefano Nepa	LEVELUP - MTA	KTM	19	+4.499	10	9
8	78	(Spain) Joel Esteban	CFMOTO Gaviota Aspar Team	CFMoto	19	+5.403	11	8
9	64	(Spain) David Muñoz	BOE Motorsports	KTM	19	+16.018	13	7
10	31	(Italy) Adrián Fernández	Leopard Racing	Honda	19	+16.143	15	6
11	12	(Australia) Jacob Roulstone	Red Bull GASGAS Tech3	Gas Gas	19	+16.213	14	5
12	24	(Japan) Tatsuki Suzuki	Liqui Moly Husqvarna Intact GP	Husqvarna	19	+20.682	20	4
13	21	(Spain) Vicente Pérez	Red Bull KTM Ajo	KTM	19	+20.682	18	3
14	19	(United Kingdom) Scott Ogden	MLav Racing	Honda	19	+21.163	9	2
15	10	(Italy) Nicola Carraro	LEVELUP - MTA	KTM	19	+21.172	16	1
16	7	(Italy) Filippo Farioli	SIC58 Squadra Corse	Honda	19	+23.285	8	
17	72	(Japan) Taiyo Furusato	Honda Team Asia	Honda	19	+32.751	21	
18	70	(United Kingdom) Joshua Whatley	MLav Racing	Honda	19	+38.600	22	
19	55	(Switzerland) Noah Dettwiler	CIP Green Power	KTM	19	+42.061	26	
20	5	(Thailand) Tatchakorn Buasri	Honda Team Asia	Honda	19	+53.651	23	
21	71	(Qatar) Hamad Al Sahouti	Rivacold Snipers Team	Honda	19	+1:10.193	24	
22	58	(Italy) Luca Lunetta	SIC58 Squadra Corse	Honda	19	+1:25.798	25	
Ret	54	(Italy) Riccardo Rossi	CIP Green Power	KTM	14	Crashed out	5	
Ret	6	(Japan) Ryusei Yamanaka	MT Helmets - MSI	KTM	0	Crashed out	17	
Ret	36	(Spain) Ángel Piqueras	Leopard Racing	Honda	0	Crashed out	19	
DSQ	18	(Italy) Matteo Bertelle	Rivacold Snipers Team	Honda	19		12	
Fastest lap: (Spain) David Alonso (CFMoto) - 1:46.985 (lap 6)
OFFICIAL MOTO3 RACE REPORT

- Matteo Bertelle originally finished 12th, but was disqualified for a Technical regulations infringement

== Championship standings after the race ==
Below are the standings for the top five riders, constructors, and teams after the round.

=== MotoGP ===
Riders' Championship standings

	Pos.	Rider	Points
2	1	(Spain) Jorge Martín	60
	2	(South Africa) Brad Binder	42
2	3	(Italy) Enea Bastianini	39
3	4	(Italy) Francesco Bagnaia	37
4	5	(Spain) Pedro Acosta	28

Constructors' Championship standings

Pos.	Constructor	Points
1	(Italy) Ducati	71
2	(Austria) KTM	50
3	(Italy) Aprilia	35
4	(Japan) Yamaha	15
5	(Japan) Honda	8

Teams' Championship standings

	Pos.	Team	Points
	1	(Italy) Ducati Lenovo Team	76
2	2	(Italy) Prima Pramac Racing	60
	3	(Austria) Red Bull KTM Factory Racing	58
1	4	(Italy) Aprilia Racing	44
3	5	(Italy) Gresini Racing MotoGP	40

=== Moto2 ===
Riders' Championship standings

	Pos.	Rider	Points
9	1	(Spain) Arón Canet	31
5	2	(United States) Joe Roberts	29
2	3	(Spain) Manuel González	27
1	4	(Spain) Sergio García	26
4	5	(Spain) Alonso López	25

Constructors' Championship standings

	Pos.	Constructor	Points
1	1	(Germany) Kalex	45
1	2	(Italy) Boscoscuro	38

Teams' Championship standings

	Pos.	Team	Points
	1	(Spain) MT Helmets – MSi	50
3	2	(United States) OnlyFans American Racing Team	46
1	3	(Italy) QJmotor Gresini Moto2	43
2	4	(Italy) Beta Tools Speed Up	38
2	5	(Italy) Fantic Racing	31

=== Moto3 ===
Riders' Championship standings

	Pos.	Rider	Points
1	1	(Spain) Daniel Holgado	45
1	2	(Colombia) David Alonso	38
6	3	(Spain) Iván Ortolá	23
1	4	(Netherlands) Collin Veijer	21
15	5	(Spain) José Antonio Rueda	20

Constructors' Championship standings

	Pos.	Constructor	Points
1	1	(Spain) Gas Gas	45
1	2	(China) CFMoto	38
1	3	(Austria) KTM	33
1	4	(Japan) Honda	22
	5	(Sweden) Husqvarna	21

Teams' Championship standings

	Pos.	Team	Points
1	1	(France) Red Bull GasGas Tech3	56
1	2	(Spain) CFMoto Gaviota Aspar Team	51
	3	(Germany) Liqui Moly Husqvarna Intact GP	33
3	4	(Spain) Boé Motorsports	26
3	5	(Spain) MT Helmets – MSi	23

=== MotoE ===
Riders' Championship standings

Pos.	Rider	Points
1	(Italy) Mattia Casadei	41
2	(Spain) Héctor Garzó	40
3	(Italy) Nicholas Spinelli	25
4	(Germany) Lukas Tulovic	23
5	(Italy) Kevin Zannoni	20

Teams' Championship standings

Pos.	Team	Points
1	(Germany) Dynavolt Intact GP MotoE	63
2	(Monaco) LCR E-Team	54
3	(Spain) Openbank Aspar Team	31
4	(France) Tech3 E-Racing	29
5	(Italy) Ongetta Sic58 Squadracorse	26

Previous race: 2024 Qatar Grand Prix	FIM Grand Prix World Championship; 2024 season	Next race: 2024 Grand Prix of the Americas
Previous race: 2023 Portuguese Grand Prix	Portuguese motorcycle Grand Prix	Next race: 2025 Portuguese Grand Prix
