= Jaume Masià =

Spanish motorcycle racer

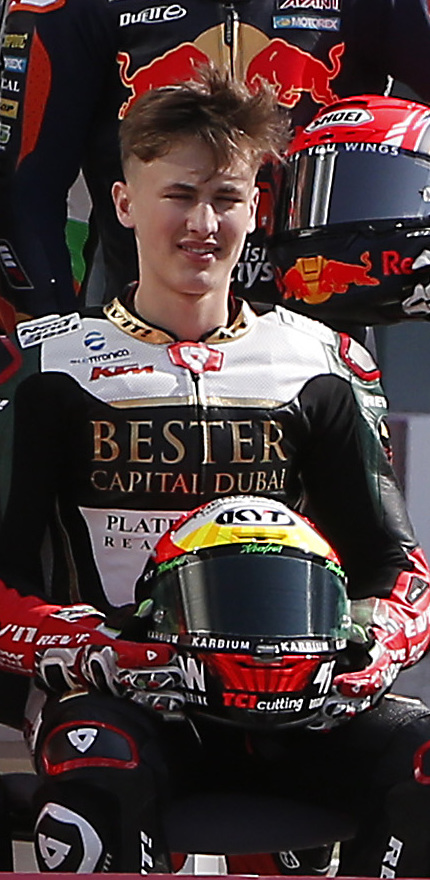
- Masià in 2019
- Nationality: Spanish
- Born: 31 October 2000 (age 26); Algemesí, Valencia, Spain
- Current team: Orelac Racing Verdnatura
- Bike number: 5
Motorcycle racing career statistics
Moto2 World Championship
Active years	2024
Manufacturers	Kalex (2024)
2024 championship position	28th (6 pts)
Starts / Wins / Podiums / Poles / F. laps / Points; 20 / 0 / 0 / 0 / 0 / 6
Moto3 World Championship
Active years	2017–2023
Manufacturers	KTM (2017–2019, 2021–2022); Honda (2020, 2023)
Championships	1 (2023)
2023 championship position	1st (274 pts)
Starts / Wins / Podiums / Poles / F. laps / Points; 111 / 10 / 27 / 10 / 15 / 972
Supersport World Championship
Active years	2025–
Manufacturers	Ducati
Championships	0
2026 championship position	6th (229 pts)
Starts / Wins / Podiums / Poles / F. laps / Points; 46 / 5 / 11 / 2 / 6 / 494

Jaume Masià Vargas (born 31 October 2000) is a Spanish motorcycle rider who currently competes in the 2026 Supersport World Championship for Orelac Racing Verdnatura. His most notable achievements are winning the 2023 Moto3 World Championship and consequently having a corner at Circuit Ricardo Tormo named after him.

== Career ==
=== Early career ===
Between 2015 and 2017, Masià competed in the FIM CEV Moto3 Junior Championship, finishing second overall to Dennis Foggia in his final season. He previously competed in the 2014 Red Bull Rookies Cup.

=== Moto3 World Championship ===
Masià made his Moto3 World Championship debut as a replacement for the injured Darryn Binder during the 2017 season, setting the fastest lap in his debut race. His impressive debut in Moto3 earned him a ride for the 2018 and 2019 seasons.

2019 saw Masià's first pole position and win at the second round in Argentina.

==== Leopard Racing (2020) ====
In 2020, Masià moved to the Leopard Racing team in what was considered a promotion with the team having won the championship in 2019. He got a pair of wins but couldn't fight for the championship that year, finishing sixth overall with 140 points and three podiums.

==== Red Bull KTM Ajo (2021–2022) ====
For the 2021 and 2022 season, Masià raced with the established Red Bull KTM Ajo team where he continued to have successes across both seasons, winning a total of three races and achieving multiple podium finishes, he achieved his best championship position of fourth in 2021.

==== Return to Leopard Racing (2023) ====
2023 saw Masià move back to the Leopard Racing team. In this season, Masia become the Moto3 world champion, winning three races in his way to the title, he also achieved ten podiums and six pole positions, the best numbers since he joined the championship. He clinched the title with a race to spare in the Qatar Grand Prix, being his last win and podium of the season.

=== Moto2 World Championship ===
==== Pertamina Mandalika SAG Team (2024) ====
Pertamina Mandalika SAG Team officially decided on their rider line-up for 2024. Masia would make his Moto2 debut in the 2024 season, teaming up with Bo Bendsneyder who was in his third year with the team.

The season didn't go as expected, as the team changed name and ownership in the middle of the season, becoming the Preicanos Racing Team, his best result was only a 13th place in the Catalan Grand Prix, his home race.

==== Preicanos Racing Team (2025) ====
Masià joined the Preicanos Racing Team for the 2025 season to race in the Moto2. However, the contract failed due to the Preicanos team which then disbanded without any clarity. This meant he was without a ride only a year after being crowned Moto3 world champion, as every other Moto2 team had their lineups complete.

=== Supersport World Championship ===
==== Orelac Racing Verdnatura (2025–) ====
Masià joined the Orelac Racing Verdnatura team, riding a Ducati Panigale V2 at WorldSSP 2025. He was successful almost instantly, getting a win at the fifth round of the season in Most. He finished the season in third place with a win in the last round, as the best rookie, and best placed Ducati rider.

Masià renewed his contract with Orelac Racing Verdnatura team for the 2026 season, where he is currently placed third in the standings with three wins to his name and several podiums.

== Career statistics ==
=== Red Bull MotoGP Rookies Cup ===
==== Races by year ====
(key) (Races in bold indicate pole position, races in italics indicate fastest lap)

Year	1	2	3	4	5	6	7	8	9	10	11	12	13	14	Pos	Pts
2014	JER1; 7	JER1; 13	MUG; Ret	ASS1; Ret	ASS2; 12	SAC1; Ret	SAC2; 8	BRN1; 11	BRN2; 8	SIL1; DNS	SIL2; DNS	MIS; DNS	ARA1	ARA2	17th	37

=== FIM CEV Moto3 Junior World Championship ===
==== Races by year ====
(key) (Races in bold indicate pole position, races in italics indicate fastest lap)

Year	Bike	1	2	3	4	5	6	7	8	9	10	11	12	Pos	Pts
2015	Honda	ALG; 8	LMS; Ret	CAT1; Ret	CAT2; 9	ARA1; 4	ARA2; 2	ALB; 8	NAV; 6	JER1; 8	JER2; 4	VAL1; 5	VAL2; 7	5th	107
2016	Honda	VAL1; Ret	VAL2; Ret	LMS	ARA; 13	CAT1; 4	CAT2; Ret	ALB; 15	ALG; 7	JER1; 9	JER2; 15	VAL1; Ret	VAL2; Ret	15th	34
2017	KTM	ALB; 3	LMS; Ret	CAT1; 2	CAT2; 3	VAL1; 6	VAL2; DSQ	EST; 4	JER1; 15	JER1; Ret	ARA; 1	**VAL1**; 1	**VAL2**; 3	2nd	142

=== Grand Prix motorcycle racing ===
==== By season ====
Season	Class	Motorcycle	Team	Race	Win	Podium	Pole	FLap	Pts	Plcd
2017	Moto3	KTM	Platinum Bay Real Estate	4	0	0	0	1	13	27th
2017	Moto3	KTM	Cuna de Campeones	1	0	0	0	1	13	27th
2018	Moto3	KTM	Bester Capital Dubai	17	0	0	0	2	76	13th
2019	Moto3	KTM	Bester Capital Dubai	17	1	4	1	1	121	9th
2020	Moto3	Honda	Leopard Racing	15	2	3	1	2	140	6th
2021	Moto3	KTM	Red Bull KTM Ajo	18	1	4	2	2	171	4th
2022	Moto3	KTM	Red Bull KTM Ajo	20	2	6	0	6	177	6th
2023	Moto3	Honda	Leopard Racing	20	4	10	6	1	274	**1st**
2024	Moto2	Kalex	Pertamina Mandalika GAS UP Team	20	0	0	0	0	6	28th
Total				**131**	**10**	**27**	**10**	**15**	**978**	

==== By class ====
Class	Seasons	1st GP	1st pod	1st win	Race	Win	Podiums	Pole	FLap	Pts	WChmp
Moto3	2017–2023	2017 Austria	2019 Argentina	2019 Argentina	111	10	27	10	15	972	1
Moto2	2024	2024 Qatar			20	0	0	0	0	6	–
Total	2017–2024				**131**	**10**	**27**	**10**	**15**	**978**	**1**

==== Races by year ====
(key) (Races in bold indicate pole position, races in italics indicate fastest lap)

Year	Class	Bike	1	2	3	4	5	6	7	8	9	10	11	12	13	14	15	16	17	18	19	20	Pos	Pts
2017	Moto3	KTM	QAT	ARG	AME	SPA	FRA	ITA	CAT	NED	GER	CZE	AUT; 9	GBR; Ret	RSM; 10	ARA; 21	JPN	AUS	MAL	VAL			27th	13
2018	Moto3	KTM	QAT; 12	ARG; Ret	AME; 21	SPA; 5	FRA; 10	ITA; Ret	CAT; Ret	NED; 4	GER; 6	CZE; 17	AUT; 6	GBR; C	RSM; Ret	ARA; 9	THA; 17	JPN; 11	AUS; Ret	MAL	VAL; 6		13th	76
2019	Moto3	KTM	QAT; Ret	**ARG**; 1	AME; 2	SPA; Ret	FRA; 12	ITA; 3	CAT; Ret	NED; Ret	GER; 16	CZE; 4	AUT; Ret	GBR; 11	RSM; 4	ARA; Ret	THA	JPN; 7	AUS; Ret	MAL; 3	VAL; DNS		9th	121
2020	Moto3	Honda	QAT; 4	SPA; 10	ANC; Ret	CZE; Ret	AUT; 2	STY; 14	RSM; 7	EMI; 5	CAT; 7	**FRA**; 4	ARA; 1	TER; 1	EUR; Ret	VAL; 9	POR; Ret						6th	140
2021	Moto3	KTM	QAT; 1	**DOH**; 9	POR; 9	SPA; 21	FRA; Ret	ITA; 2	CAT; 4	GER; Ret	NED; 20	STY; 4	AUT; 6	GBR; 6	ARA; 10	RSM; 5	**AME**; 4	EMI; 2	ALR; 19	VAL; 3			4th	171
2022	Moto3	KTM	QAT; Ret	INA; 7	ARG; Ret	AME; 1	POR; 2	SPA; 3	FRA; 1	ITA; 17	CAT; 8	GER; 12	NED; Ret	GBR; 2	AUT; 18	RSM; 2	ARA; 8	JPN; Ret	THA; 8	AUS; 15	MAL; 4	VAL; 22	6th	177
2023	Moto3	Honda	POR; 5	ARG; Ret	**AME**; 2	SPA; 3	FRA; 3	ITA; 5	GER; 6	NED; 1	**GBR**; 18	AUT; Ret	CAT; 2	**RSM**; 2	**IND**; 1	**JPN**; 1	INA; 6	AUS; 8	THA; 4	**MAL**; 3	QAT; 1	VAL; 13	1st	274
2024	Moto2	Kalex	QAT; 25	POR; 21	AME; 19	SPA; Ret	FRA; 16	CAT; 13	ITA; 21	NED; 24	GER; 15	GBR; Ret	AUT; 19	ARA; 19	RSM; 24	EMI; Ret	INA; Ret	JPN; 24	AUS; Ret	THA; 17	MAL; 16	SLD; 14	28th	6

=== Supersport World Championship ===
==== By season ====
Season	Motorcycle	Team	Race	Win	Podium	Pole	FLap	Pts	Plcd
2025	Ducati Panigale V2	Orelac Racing Verdnatura	24	2	5	1	3	265	**3rd**
2026	Ducati Panigale V2	Orelac Racing Verdnatura	22	3	6	1	3	229	6th
Total			**46**	**5**	**11**	**2**	**6**	**494**	

==== Races by year ====
(key) (Races in bold indicate pole position; races in italics indicate fastest lap)

Year	Bike	1		2		3		4		5		6		7		8		9		10		11		12		Pos	Pts
Year	Bike	R1	R2	R1	R2	R1	R2	R1	R2	R1	R2	R1	R2	R1	R2	R1	R2	R1	R2	R1	R2	R1	R2	R1	R2	Pos	Pts
2025	Ducati	AUS; 6	AUS; Ret	POR; 7	POR; 7	NED; 4	NED; 5	ITA; 4	ITA; 3	CZE; 1	**CZE**; Ret	**ITA**; 2	ITA; 2	GBR; 4	GBR; 4	HUN; 7	HUN; 6	FRA; Ret	FRA; 9	SPA; 6	SPA; 5	POR; 8	POR; Ret	SPA; 4	SPA; 1	3rd	265
2026	Ducati	**AUS**; 1	**AUS**; 10	POR; 2	POR; 2	NED; 1	NED; 6	HUN; Ret	HUN; 5	CZE; 4	CZE; Ret	SPA; 5	SPA; 1	ITA; Ret	ITA; 4	GBR; Ret	GBR; 3	FRA; 10	FRA; 7	ITA; 7	ITA; 6	POR; 17	POR; Ret	SPA; WD	SPA; WD	6th	229

* Season still in progress.
