= 2019 Argentine Republic motorcycle Grand Prix =

(Argentina) 2019 Argentine Republic Grand Prix
Race details
- Race 2 of 19 races in the 2019 Grand Prix motorcycle racing season
- Date: 31 March 2019
- Official name: Gran Premio Motul de la República Argentina
- Location: Autódromo Termas de Río Hondo, Santiago del Estero, Argentina
- Course: Permanent racing facility; 4.806 km (2.986 mi)

MotoGP
Pole position
Rider	(Spain) Marc Márquez	Honda
Time	1:38.304	
Fastest lap
Rider	(Spain) Marc Márquez	Honda
Time	1:39.426 on lap 2	
Podium
First	(Spain) Marc Márquez	Honda
Second	(Italy) Valentino Rossi	Yamaha
Third	(Italy) Andrea Dovizioso	Ducati

Moto2
Pole position
Rider	(Spain) Xavi Vierge	Kalex
Time	1:42.726	
Fastest lap
Rider	(Australia) Remy Gardner	Kalex
Time	1:43.012 on lap 2	
Podium
First	(Italy) Lorenzo Baldassarri	Kalex
Second	(Australia) Remy Gardner	Kalex
Third	(Spain) Álex Márquez	Kalex

Moto3
Pole position
Rider	(Spain) Jaume Masiá	KTM
Time	1:48.775	
Fastest lap
Rider	(Argentina) Gabriel Rodrigo	Honda
Time	1:49.433 on lap 2	
Podium
First	(Spain) Jaume Masiá	KTM
Second	(South Africa) Darryn Binder	KTM
Third	(Italy) Tony Arbolino	Honda

The 2019 Argentine Republic motorcycle Grand Prix was the second round of the 2019 MotoGP season. It was held at the Autódromo Termas de Río Hondo in Santiago del Estero on 31 March 2019.

== Classification ==
=== MotoGP ===
Pos.	No.	Rider	Team	Manufacturer	Laps	Time/Retired	Grid	Points
1	93	(Spain) Marc Márquez	Repsol Honda Team	Honda	25	41:43.688	1	25
2	46	(Italy) Valentino Rossi	Monster Energy Yamaha MotoGP	Yamaha	25	+9.816	4	20
3	4	(Italy) Andrea Dovizioso	Mission Winnow Ducati	Ducati	25	+10.530	3	16
4	43	(Australia) Jack Miller	Pramac Racing	Ducati	25	+12.140	5	13
5	42	(Spain) Álex Rins	Team Suzuki Ecstar	Suzuki	25	+12.563	16	11
6	9	(Italy) Danilo Petrucci	Mission Winnow Ducati	Ducati	25	+13.750	10	10
7	30	(Japan) Takaaki Nakagami	LCR Honda Idemitsu	Honda	25	+18.160	9	9
8	20	(France) Fabio Quartararo	Petronas Yamaha SRT	Yamaha	25	+20.403	7	8
9	41	(Spain) Aleix Espargaró	Aprilia Racing Team Gresini	Aprilia	25	+25.292	13	7
10	44	(Spain) Pol Espargaró	Red Bull KTM Factory Racing	KTM	25	+25.679	11	6
11	88	(Portugal) Miguel Oliveira	Red Bull KTM Tech3	KTM	25	+25.855	14	5
12	99	(Spain) Jorge Lorenzo	Repsol Honda Team	Honda	25	+27.497	12	4
13	35	(United Kingdom) Cal Crutchlow	LCR Honda Castrol	Honda	25	+31.398	8	3
14	63	(Italy) Francesco Bagnaia	Pramac Racing	Ducati	25	+32.893	17	2
15	5	(France) Johann Zarco	Red Bull KTM Factory Racing	KTM	25	+33.372	18	1
16	55	(Malaysia) Hafizh Syahrin	Red Bull KTM Tech3	KTM	25	+35.545	21	
17	29	(Italy) Andrea Iannone	Aprilia Racing Team Gresini	Aprilia	25	+38.238	22	
Ret	12	(Spain) Maverick Viñales	Monster Energy Yamaha MotoGP	Yamaha	24	Accident	2	
Ret	21	(Italy) Franco Morbidelli	Petronas Yamaha SRT	Yamaha	24	Accident	6	
Ret	36	(Spain) Joan Mir	Team Suzuki Ecstar	Suzuki	21	Tyre Vibration	19	
Ret	53	(Spain) Tito Rabat	Reale Avintia Racing	Ducati	15	Accident	20	
Ret	17	(Czech Republic) Karel Abraham	Reale Avintia Racing	Ducati	14	Accident	15	

=== Moto2 ===
Pos.	No.	Rider	Manufacturer	Laps	Time/Retired	Grid	Points
1	7	(Italy) Lorenzo Baldassarri	Kalex	23	39:46.000	8	25
2	87	(Australia) Remy Gardner	Kalex	23	+1.244	7	20
3	73	(Spain) Álex Márquez	Kalex	23	+1.817	4	16
4	27	(Spain) Iker Lecuona	KTM	23	+2.704	15	13
5	23	(Germany) Marcel Schrötter	Kalex	23	+4.839	2	11
6 (Note: 1-place penalty.)	41	(South Africa) Brad Binder	KTM	23	+4.707	6	10
7	10	(Italy) Luca Marini	Kalex	23	+4.986	13	9
8	9	(Spain) Jorge Navarro	Speed Up	23	+7.459	11	8
9	33	(Italy) Enea Bastianini	Kalex	23	+8.724	12	7
10	35	(Thailand) Somkiat Chantra	Kalex	23	+14.506	19	6
11	5	(Italy) Andrea Locatelli	Kalex	23	+16.145	14	5
12	45	(Japan) Tetsuta Nagashima	Kalex	23	+16.450	22	4
13	89	(Malaysia) Khairul Idham Pawi	Kalex	23	+16.613	25	3
14	64	(Netherlands) Bo Bendsneyder	NTS	23	+23.007	16	2
15	2	(Switzerland) Jesko Raffin	NTS	23	+24.736	24	1
16	72	(Italy) Marco Bezzecchi	KTM	23	+25.381	21	
17	96	(United Kingdom) Jake Dixon	KTM	23	+41.684	27	
18	3	(Germany) Lukas Tulovic	KTM	23	+45.545	30 (Note: 3-place grid penalty.)	
19	65	(Germany) Philipp Öttl	KTM	23	+45.811	29	
20	77	(Switzerland) Dominique Aegerter	MV Agusta	23	+56.934	20	
21	18	(Andorra) Xavi Cardelús	KTM	23	+1:07.765	31	
22	16	(United States) Joe Roberts	KTM	23	+1:18.707	26	
23	20	(Indonesia) Dimas Ekky Pratama	Kalex	19	+4 laps	28	
Ret	24	(Italy) Simone Corsi	Kalex	21	Gearbox	10	
Ret	88	(Spain) Jorge Martín	KTM	18	Accident	17	
Ret	11	(Italy) Nicolò Bulega	Kalex	18	Rider In Pain	9	
Ret	21	(Italy) Fabio Di Giannantonio	Speed Up	12	Leg Cramp	18	
Ret	22	(United Kingdom) Sam Lowes	Kalex	5	Accident	3	
Ret	12	(Switzerland) Thomas Lüthi	Kalex	5	Accident	5	
Ret	62	(Italy) Stefano Manzi	MV Agusta	1	Accident	23	
DNS	97	(Spain) Xavi Vierge	Kalex	0	Did not start	1	
DNS	40	(Spain) Augusto Fernández	Kalex		Did not start		
OFFICIAL MOTO2 REPORT

- Xavi Vierge's bike experienced an electrical failure on the warm-up lap.
- Augusto Fernández suffered a broken wrist in a crash during practice and withdrew from the event.

=== Moto3 ===
Pos.	No.	Rider	Manufacturer	Laps	Time/Retired	Grid	Points
1	5	(Spain) Jaume Masiá	KTM	21	38:54.562	1	25
2	40	(South Africa) Darryn Binder	KTM	21	+0.108	20	20
3	14	(Italy) Tony Arbolino	Honda	21	+0.295	3	16
4	23	(Italy) Niccolò Antonelli	Honda	21	+0.386	5	13
5	71	(Japan) Ayumu Sasaki	Honda	21	+0.519	9	11
6	19	(Argentina) Gabriel Rodrigo	Honda	21	+0.550	13	10
7	48	(Italy) Lorenzo Dalla Porta	Honda	21	+0.588	4	9
8	7	(Italy) Dennis Foggia	KTM	21	+0.671	22	8
9	42	(Spain) Marcos Ramírez	Honda	21	+0.792	12	7
10	27	(Japan) Kaito Toba	Honda	21	+1.280	8	6
11	16	(Italy) Andrea Migno	KTM	21	+1.629	6	5
12	44	(Spain) Arón Canet	KTM	21	+1.775	2	4
13	24	(Japan) Tatsuki Suzuki	Honda	21	+1.836	14	3
14	13	(Italy) Celestino Vietti	KTM	21	+1.978	21	2
15	25	(Spain) Raúl Fernández	KTM	21	+2.092	10	1
16	55	(Italy) Romano Fenati	Honda	21	+2.273	7	
17	79	(Japan) Ai Ogura	Honda	21	+2.350	15	
18	69	(United Kingdom) Tom Booth-Amos	KTM	21	+9.798	27	
19	81	(Spain) Aleix Viu	KTM	21	+9.904	25	
20	76	(Kazakhstan) Makar Yurchenko	KTM	21	+10.136	28	
21	17	(United Kingdom) John McPhee	Honda	21	+26.464	11	
22	54	(Italy) Riccardo Rossi	Honda	21	+27.044	26	
23	22	(Japan) Kazuki Masaki	KTM	21	+39.985	19	
24	84	(Czech Republic) Jakub Kornfeil	KTM	21	+40.177	16	
25	12	(Czech Republic) Filip Salač	KTM	21	+58.474	24	
26	61	(Turkey) Can Öncü	KTM	20	+1 lap	23	
Ret	77	(Spain) Vicente Pérez	KTM	13	Accident	18	
Ret	21	(Spain) Alonso López	Honda	11	Accident	17	
DNS	11	(Spain) Sergio García	Honda		Did not start		
OFFICIAL MOTO3 REPORT

- Sergio García was declared unfit to start the race following a collision with Jaume Masiá during Sunday morning warm-up session.

== Championship standings after the race ==
=== MotoGP ===
Pos.	Rider	Points
1	(Spain) Marc Márquez	45
2	(Italy) Andrea Dovizioso	41
3	(Italy) Valentino Rossi	31
4	(Spain) Álex Rins	24
5	(Italy) Danilo Petrucci	20
6	(United Kingdom) Cal Crutchlow	19
7	(Japan) Takaaki Nakagami	16
8	(Australia) Jack Miller	13
9	(Spain) Aleix Espargaró	13
10	(Spain) Pol Espargaró	10

=== Moto2 ===
Pos.	Rider	Points
1	(Italy) Lorenzo Baldassarri	50
2	(Australia) Remy Gardner	33
3	(Germany) Marcel Schrötter	27
4	(Spain) Álex Márquez	25
5	(Switzerland) Thomas Lüthi	20
6	(Italy) Luca Marini	17
7	(South Africa) Brad Binder	14
8	(Italy) Enea Bastianini	14
9	(Spain) Iker Lecuona	11
10	(Spain) Augusto Fernández	10

=== Moto3 ===
Pos.	Rider	Points
1	(Japan) Kaito Toba	31
2	(Italy) Lorenzo Dalla Porta	29
3	(Spain) Jaume Masiá	25
4	(Italy) Niccolò Antonelli	21
5	(South Africa) Darryn Binder	20
6	(Spain) Arón Canet	20
7	(Spain) Marcos Ramírez	20
8	(Italy) Tony Arbolino	16
9	(Italy) Celestino Vietti	13
10	(Japan) Ayumu Sasaki	11

== Notes ==
Previous race: 2019 Qatar Grand Prix	FIM Grand Prix World Championship; 2019 season	Next race: 2019 Grand Prix of the Americas
Previous race: 2018 Argentine Grand Prix	Argentine Republic motorcycle Grand Prix	Next race: 2022 Argentine Grand Prix
