= Bo Bendsneyder =

Dutch motorcycle racer (born 1999)

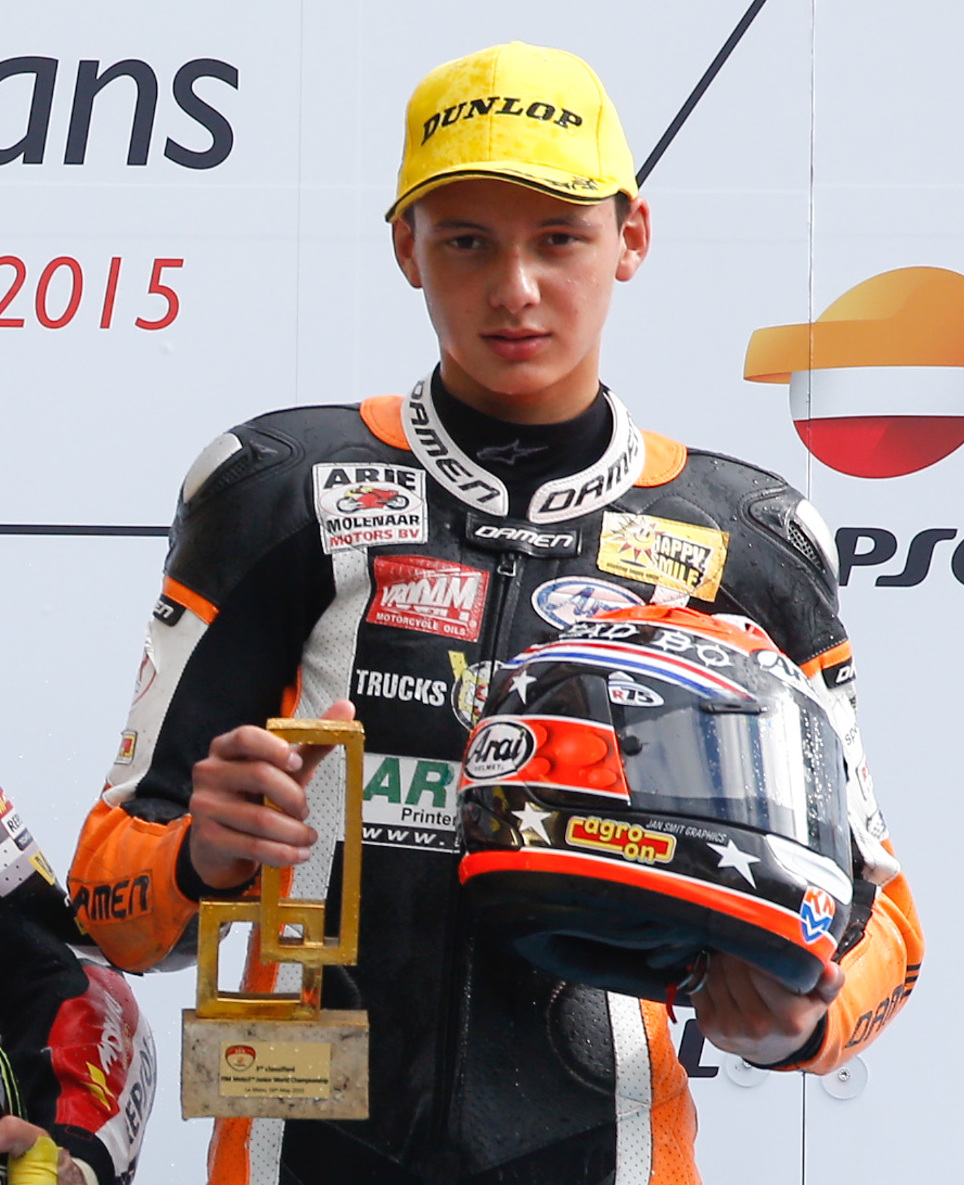
- Bendsneyder in 2015
- Nationality: Dutch
- Born: 4 March 1999 (age 27); Rotterdam, Netherlands
- Current team: Elf Marc VDS Racing Team/KM99
- Bike number: 99
- Website: bobendsneyder.nl
Motorcycle racing career statistics
Moto2 World Championship
Active years	2018–2024
Manufacturers	Tech3 (2018); NTS (2019–2020); Kalex (2021–2024)
Championships	0
2024 championship position	27th (7 pts)
Starts / Wins / Podiums / Poles / F. laps / Points; 116 / 0 / 1 / 0 / 0 / 197
Moto3 World Championship
Active years	2016–2017
Manufacturers	KTM
Championships	0
2017 championship position	15th (65 pts)
Starts / Wins / Podiums / Poles / F. laps / Points; 35 / 0 / 2 / 0 / 0 / 143
Supersport World Championship
Active years	2024–
Manufacturers	MV Agusta
2025 championship position	9th (178 pts)
Starts / Wins / Podiums / Poles / F. laps / Points; 24 / 2 / 7 / 2 / 2 / 222

Bo Bendsneyder (born 4 March 1999) is a Dutch motorcycle racer, currently competing in the FIM Endurance World Championship for Elf Marc VDS Racing Team/KM99. He has also previously raced in Moto2 and Moto3 extensively. Bendsneyder was the Red Bull MotoGP Rookies Cup champion in 2015.

== Career ==
=== Moto3 World Championship ===
==== Red Bull KTM Ajo (2016–2017) ====
In 2016, Bendsneyder made his debut in the Moto3 class, Riding for the Red Bull KTM Ajo team. He got two podiums (Great Britain and Malaysia) and closed the season in 14th place in the riders' championship standings with 78 points.

In 2017, Bendsneyder stayed with the same team. His best result was a fourth place in the Czech Republic and ended the season in 15th place in the riders' championship standings with 65 points.

=== Moto2 World Championship ===
==== Tech 3 Racing (2018) ====
In 2018, Bendsneyder moved to Moto2 with Tech 3. He concluded the season in 29th place with two points, his best finish was 14th place in Thailand. During the 2018 Japanese Grand Prix, he suffered a broken tibia due to flying shrapnel from an engine explosion on the last lap of the race.

==== NTS RW Racing GP (2019–2020) ====
In 2019, Bendsneyder moved to NTS. He got his best result of the season a 13th place in the Grand Prix of the Americas and ended the season in 26th place with seven points.

In 2020, Bendsneyder stayed with the same team. His best result was an eighth place in Valencia and he ended the season in 23rd place with 18 points.

==== Pertamina Mandalika SAG Team (2021–2024) ====
Bendsneyder would race in the 2021 Moto2 World Championship for the Pertamina Mandalika SAG Racing Team.

=== FIM Endurance World Championship ===
==== Marc VDS (2026–present) ====
Bendsneyder joined the Marc VDS Racing Team, specifically in a new role for the FIM Endurance World Championship. He will be teammates with Randy de Puniet, Florian Marino and Alessandro Delbianco in the ELF Marc VDS - KM99 team for the 2026 season.

== Career statistics ==
=== Career highlights ===
- 2013 - 10th, European Junior Cup, Honda CBR500R

=== Red Bull MotoGP Rookies Cup ===
==== Races by year ====
(key) (Races in bold indicate pole position, races in italics indicate fastest lap)

Year	1	2	3	4	5	6	7	8	9	10	11	12	13	14	Pos	Pts
2014	JER1; 8	JER1; 6	MUG; 12	**ASS1**; 4	**ASS2**; 1	SAC1	SAC2	BRN1; 13	BRN2; Ret	SIL1; 6	SIL2; 3	MIS; 8	ARA1; 5	ARA2; 7	9th	117
2015	**JER1**; 1	**JER1**; 1	**ASS1**; 1	**ASS2**; 1	SAC1; 1	SAC2; Ret	BRN1; 2	BRN2; 1	**SIL1**; 1	**SIL2**; 3	**MIS**; 1	ARA1; DNS	ARA2; 9		1st	243

=== FIM CEV Moto3 Junior World Championship ===
==== Races by year ====
(key) (Races in bold indicate pole position, races in italics indicate fastest lap)

Year	Bike	1	2	3	4	5	6	7	8	9	10	11	12	Pos	Pts
2014	FTR Honda	JER1; 9	JER2; 12	LMS; Ret	ARA; 11	CAT1; 12	CAT2; 13	ALB; Ret	NAV; 23	ALG; 6	VAL1; 33	VAL2; 17		15th	33
2015	Honda	ALG; 4	LMS; 3	CAT1; 6	CAT2; 7	ARA1; 12	ARA2; 8	ALB; 6	NAV; 13	JER1; 4	JER2; 9	VAL1	VAL2	7th	93

=== Grand Prix motorcycle racing ===
==== By season ====
Season	Class	Motorcycle	Team	Race	Win	Podium	Pole	FLap	Pts	Plcd
2016	Moto3	KTM	Red Bull KTM Ajo	18	0	2	0	0	78	14th
2017	Moto3	KTM	Red Bull KTM Ajo	17	0	0	0	0	65	15th
2018	Moto2	Tech3	Tech 3 Racing	15	0	0	0	0	2	29th
2019	Moto2	NTS	NTS RW Racing GP	19	0	0	0	0	7	26th
2020	Moto2	NTS	NTS RW Racing GP	15	0	0	0	0	18	23rd
2021	Moto2	Kalex	Pertamina Mandalika SAG Team	18	0	0	0	0	46	16th
2022	Moto2	Kalex	Pertamina Mandalika SAG Team	20	0	0	0	0	87	13th
2023	Moto2	Kalex	Pertamina Mandalika SAG Team	19	0	1	0	0	30	21st
2024	Moto2	Kalex	Pertamina Mandalika GAS Up Team	10	0	0	0	0	7	27th
Total				**151**	**0**	**3**	**0**	**0**	**338**	

==== By class ====
Class	Seasons	1st GP	1st pod	1st win	Race	Win	Podiums	Pole	FLap	Pts	WChmp
Moto3	2016–2017	2016 Qatar	2016 Great Britain		35	0	2	0	0	143	0
Moto2	2018–2024	2018 Qatar	2023 Americas		116	0	1	0	0	197	0
Total	2016–2024				**151**	**0**	**3**	**0**	**0**	**340**	**0**

==== Races by year ====
(key) (Races in bold indicate pole position, races in italics indicate fastest lap)

Year	Class	Bike	1	2	3	4	5	6	7	8	9	10	11	12	13	14	15	16	17	18	19	20	Pos	Pts
2016	Moto3	KTM	QAT; 14	ARG; 22	AME; 22	SPA; 21	FRA; 16	ITA; 18	CAT; 11	NED; 9	GER; 12	AUT; 7	CZE; 7	GBR; 3	RSM; Ret	ARA; 15	JPN; 18	AUS; 10	MAL; 3	VAL; 13			14th	78
2017	Moto3	KTM	QAT; 26	ARG; 23	AME; DNS	SPA; 11	FRA; 9	ITA; 12	CAT; 15	NED; Ret	GER; 8	CZE; 4	AUT; Ret	GBR; Ret	RSM; 6	ARA; 17	JPN; 9	AUS; 16	MAL; 10	VAL; 12			15th	65
2018	Moto2	Tech3	QAT; 18	ARG; 28	AME; 20	SPA; 16	FRA; 16	ITA; Ret	CAT; Ret	NED; 17	GER; 20	CZE; Ret	AUT; 22	GBR; C	RSM; 20	ARA; 25	THA; 14	JPN; Ret	AUS	MAL	VAL		29th	2
2019	Moto2	NTS	QAT; 16	ARG; 14	AME; 13	SPA; 16	FRA; Ret	ITA; 19	CAT; 18	NED; Ret	GER; 16	CZE; 17	AUT; 15	GBR; 21	RSM; 17	ARA; 18	THA; 20	JPN; 16	AUS; 15	MAL; Ret	VAL; 24		26th	7
2020	Moto2	NTS	QAT; 11	SPA; Ret	ANC; 19	CZE; 18	AUT; 22	STY; 24	RSM; 19	EMI; 22	CAT; 17	FRA; 20	ARA; 21	TER; 16	EUR; 14	VAL; 8	POR; 13						23rd	18
2021	Moto2	Kalex	QAT; 9	DOH; 12	POR; Ret	SPA; 14	FRA; 5	ITA; 15	CAT; 6	GER; 13	NED; 15	STY; 23	AUT; 17	GBR; 15	ARA; Ret	RSM; 25	AME; 15	EMI; 12	ALR; 15	VAL; 25			16th	46
2022	Moto2	Kalex	QAT; 19	INA; 15	ARG; 9	AME; 7	POR; 8	SPA; 7	FRA; 14	ITA; 11	CAT; 13	GER; 16	NED; 5	GBR; 10	AUT; 15	RSM; 12	ARA; 15	JPN; 9	THA; 18	AUS; 10	MAL; 14	VAL; 11	13th	87
2023	Moto2	Kalex	POR; Ret	ARG; 22	AME; 3	SPA; 17	FRA; 18	ITA; 14	GER; Ret	NED; WD	GBR; 17	AUT; 15	CAT; Ret	RSM; 13	IND; 18	JPN; 17	INA; 12	AUS; 8^{‡}	THA; 16	MAL; 17	QAT; 22	VAL; 24	21st	30
2024	Moto2	Kalex	QAT; 14	POR; 16	AME; 18	SPA; Ret	FRA	CAT	ITA	NED; 14	GER; Ret	GBR; 13	AUT; 22	ARA; Ret	RSM; 20	EMI	INA	JPN	AUS	THA	MAL	SLD	27th	7

^{‡} Half points awarded as less than half of the race distance (but at least three full laps) was completed.

=== Supersport World Championship ===
==== Races by year ====
(key) (Races in bold indicate pole position, races in italics indicate fastest lap)

Year	Bike	1		2		3		4		5		6		7		8		9		10		11		12		Pos	Pts
Year	Bike	R1	R2	R1	R2	R1	R2	R1	R2	R1	R2	R1	R2	R1	R2	R1	R2	R1	R2	R1	R2	R1	R2	R1	R2	Pos	Pts
2024	MV Agusta	AUS	AUS	SPA	SPA	NED	NED	EMI	EMI	GBR	GBR	CZE	CZE	POR	POR	FRA	FRA	ITA	ITA	SPA	SPA	POR; 8	POR; 5	SPA; 7	SPA; 3	18th	44
2025	MV Agusta	**AUS**; 4	**AUS**; 3	POR; 3	POR; 1	NED; 1	NED; 3	ITA; 7	ITA; 5	CZE; 8	CZE; 10	EMI; 13	EMI; 8	GBR; 28	GBR; 17	**HUN**; 3	HUN; 16	FRA; 10	FRA; 17	ARA; 31	ARA; 19	EST	EST	SPA	SPA	9th	178

Sporting positions
Preceded by Jorge Martín	Red Bull MotoGP Rookies Cup champion 2015	Succeeded by Ayumu Sasaki
