= SAG Team =

Motorcycle racing team

GAS UP Racing Team
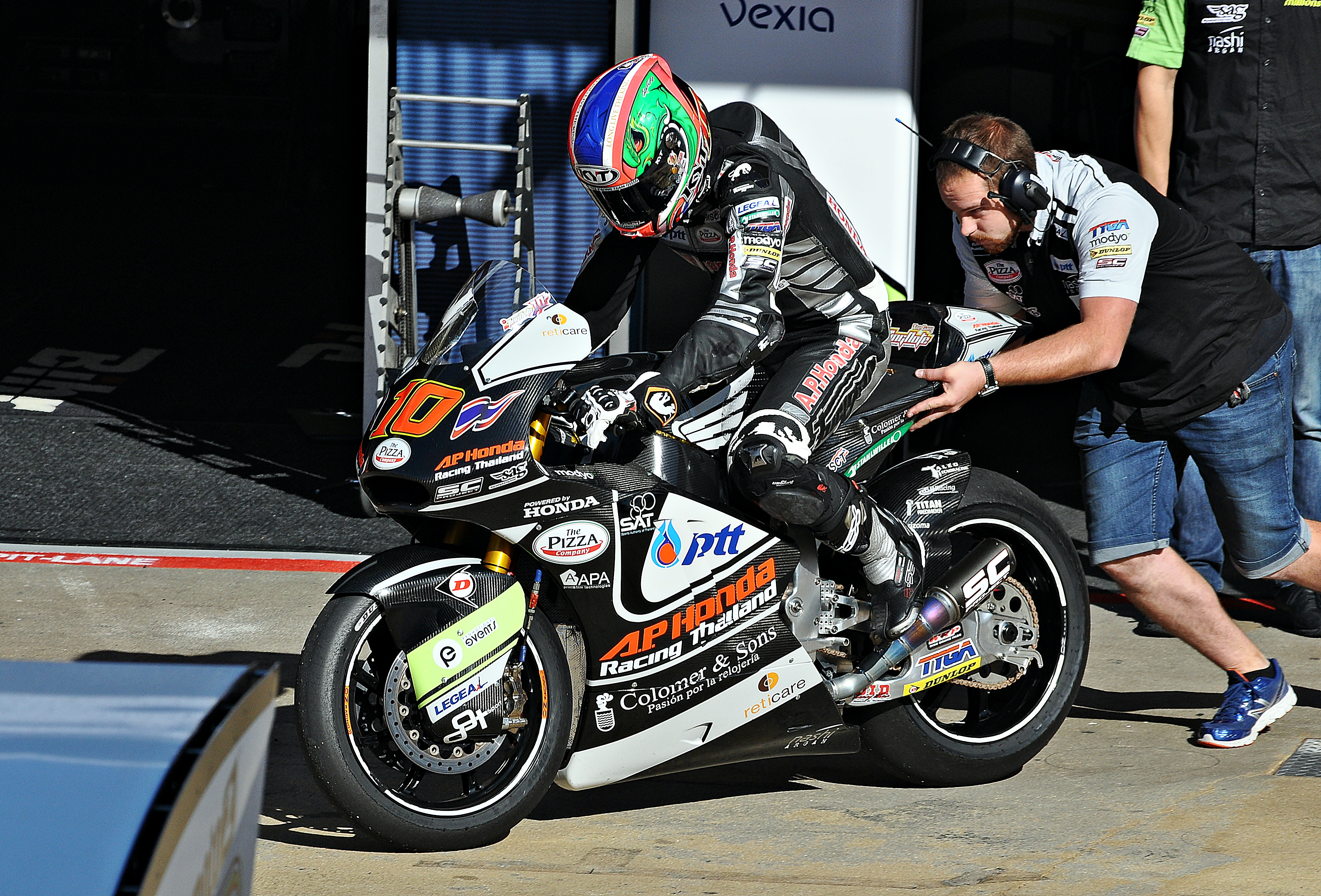
- 2024 name: GAS UP Racing Team
- Base: United States, Spain
- Motorcycle: Kalex Moto2
- Tyres: Pirelli
- Riders' Championships: –

SAG Team or Stop and Go Team, and later GasUP Racing Team, was a motorcycle racing team from United States and Spain, formerly competing in the Moto2 World Championship.

== History ==
The team debuted in the 2006 season. At that time competing in the 250cc class with their riders Jordi Carchano and Fabricio Perren. The principal of this team is Edu Perales, who is Spanish.

SAG Team rider, Luis Salom died an fatal accident during FP2 for the 2016 Catalan motorcycle Grand Prix. The team achieved its first and only victory in Moto2 class in 2020 Portuguese Grand Prix with Remy Gardner.

On November 9, 2020, the team was launched in Jakarta and has sponsorship from Indonesian racing team, Mandalika Racing Team in the 2021. Pertamina is the main sponsor of the team along with several Indonesian State-Owned Enterprises. This season, SAG fielded both of their riders, Bo Bendsneyder and Thomas Lüthi.

In 2024, the team was renamed to Preicanos Racing Team after receiving a title sponsorship from Preico Juridicios in between the season right after the Mugello round, the rebranding was announced. Bo Bendsneyder was replaced by Dani Munoz after San Marino GP. The sponsor did not honor the terms by end of season and defaulted on payments, which caused issues in the operations and the team did not participate in the 2025 and 2026 season.

== Results ==
Year	Class	Team name	Motorcycle	No.	Riders	Races	Wins	Podiums	Poles	F. laps	Points	Pos.
2006	250cc	Stop and Go Racing Team	Honda RS250RW	24	(Spain) Jordi Carchano	4 (15)	0	0	0	0	4	29th
2006	250cc	Stop and Go Racing Team	Honda RS250RW	37	(Argentina) Fabricio Perrén	11	0	0	0	0	7	27th
2007	250cc	Thai Honda PTT-SAG	Honda RS250R	8	(Thailand) Ratthapark Wilairot	17	0	0	0	0	30	17th
2008	250cc	Thai Honda PTT-SAG	Honda RS250R	14	(Thailand) Ratthapark Wilairot	16	0	0	0	0	73	13th
2008	125cc	SAG Castrol	Honda RS125R	31	(Spain) Jordi Dalmau	1	0	0	0	0	0	NC
2009	250cc	Thai PTT Honda SAG	Honda RS250R	14	(Thailand) Ratthapark Wilairot	16	0	0	0	0	82	13th
2009	125cc	SAG-Castrol	Honda RS125R	31	(Spain) Jordi Dalmau	3	0	0	0	0	0	NC
2009	125cc	SAG-Castrol	Honda RS125R	39	(Spain) Luis Salom	2 (12)	0	0	0	0	0 (21)	22nd
2010	Moto2	Thai Honda PTT Singha SAG; Maquinza-SAG Team	Bimota HB4	14	(Thailand) Ratthapark Wilairot	17	0	0	0	0	30	22nd
2010	Moto2	Thai Honda PTT Singha SAG; Maquinza-SAG Team	Bimota HB4	76	(Spain) Bernat Martínez	7	0	0	0	0	0	NC
2010	Moto2	Thai Honda PTT Singha SAG; Maquinza-SAG Team	Bimota HB4	4	(Spain) Ricky Cardús	6 (7)	0	0	0	0	0	NC
2010	Moto2	Thai Honda PTT Singha SAG; Maquinza-SAG Team	Bimota HB4	46	(Spain) Javier Forés	2 (3)	0	0	0	0	0	NC
2010	125cc	SAG Castrol	Honda RS125R	58	(Spain) Joan Perelló	4 (5)	0	0	0	0	0	NC
2010	125cc	SAG Castrol	Honda RS125R	59	(Spain) Johnny Rosell	3	0	0	0	0	0	NC
2011	Moto2	Thai Honda Singha SAG; SAG Team	FTR Moto M211	14	(Thailand) Ratthapark Wilairot	14	0	0	0	0	4	30th
2011	Moto2	Thai Honda Singha SAG; SAG Team	FTR Moto M211	64	(Colombia) Santiago Hernández	16	0	0	0	0	0	NC
2011	Moto2	Thai Honda Singha SAG; SAG Team	FTR Moto M211	35	(Italy) Raffaele de Rosa	1 (13)	0	0	0	0	0	NC
2011	Moto2	Thai Honda Singha SAG; SAG Team	FTR Moto M211	23	(Thailand) Apiwat Wongthananon	1	0	0	0	0	0	NC
2012	Moto2	SAG Team; Desguaces La Torre SAG	FTR Moto M212	10	(Switzerland) Marco Colandrea	15	0	0	0	0	0	NC
2012	Moto2	SAG Team; Desguaces La Torre SAG	FTR Moto M212	28	(Spain) Román Ramos	1	0	0	0	0	0	NC
2012	Moto2	SAG Team; Desguaces La Torre SAG	FTR Moto M212; Bimota HB4	47	(Spain) Ángel Rodríguez	6	0	0	0	0	0	NC
2012	Moto2	SAG Team; Desguaces La Torre SAG	Bimota HB4	50	(Australia) Damian Cudlin	2	0	0	0	0	0	NC
2012	Moto2	SAG Team; Desguaces La Torre SAG	Bimota HB4	55	(Italy) Massimo Roccoli	1	0	0	0	0	0	NC
2012	Moto2	SAG Team; Desguaces La Torre SAG	Bimota HB4	23	(Germany) Marcel Schrötter	8	0	0	0	0	0	NC
2013	Moto2	Desguaces La Torre Maptaq; Desguaces La Torre SAG; Maptaq SAG Zelos Team	Kalex Moto2	19	(Belgium) Xavier Siméon	17	0	1	1	0	90	12th
2013	Moto2	Desguaces La Torre Maptaq; Desguaces La Torre SAG; Maptaq SAG Zelos Team	Kalex Moto2	23	(Germany) Marcel Schrötter	17	0	0	0	0	38	16th
2014	Moto2	APH PTT The Pizza SAG; SAG Team	Kalex Moto2	10	(Thailand) Thitipong Warokorn	18	0	0	0	0	0	NC
2014	Moto2	APH PTT The Pizza SAG; SAG Team	Kalex Moto2	96	(France) Louis Rossi	18	0	0	0	0	18	26th
2015	Moto2	Sports-Millions-Emwe-SAG; APH PTT The Pizza SAG	Kalex Moto2	2	(Switzerland) Jesko Raffin	18	0	0	0	0	0	NC
2015	Moto2	Sports-Millions-Emwe-SAG; APH PTT The Pizza SAG	Kalex Moto2	10	(Thailand) Thitipong Warokorn	18	0	0	0	0	0	NC
2016	Moto2	Sports-Millions-Emwe-SAG; SAG Team	Kalex Moto2	2	(Switzerland) Jesko Raffin	17	0	0	0	0	14	25th
2016	Moto2	Sports-Millions-Emwe-SAG; SAG Team	Kalex Moto2	39	(Spain) Luis Salom^{†}	6	0	1	0	0	37	19th
2017	Moto2	BE-A-VIP SAG Team; Teluru SAG Team	Kalex Moto2	32	(Spain) Isaac Viñales	18	0	0	0	0	18	22nd
2017	Moto2	BE-A-VIP SAG Team; Teluru SAG Team	Kalex Moto2	45	(Japan) Tetsuta Nagashima	18	0	0	0	0	14	26th
2018	Moto2	SAG Team; Nashi Argan SAG Team; Temporary Lavorint SAG Team	Kalex Moto2	32	(Spain) Isaac Viñales	9 (15)	0	0	0	0	7	26th
2018	Moto2	SAG Team; Nashi Argan SAG Team; Temporary Lavorint SAG Team	Kalex Moto2	95	(France) Jules Danilo	17	0	0	0	0	0	34th
2018	Moto2	SAG Team; Nashi Argan SAG Team; Temporary Lavorint SAG Team	Kalex Moto2	55	(Spain) Alejandro Medina	2	0	0	0	0	0	42nd
2018	Moto2	SAG Team; Nashi Argan SAG Team; Temporary Lavorint SAG Team	Kalex Moto2	2	(Switzerland) Jesko Raffin	6	0	0	0	0	10	22nd
2018	Moto2	SAG Team; Nashi Argan SAG Team; Temporary Lavorint SAG Team	Kalex Moto2	99	(Thailand) Thitipong Warokorn	1	0	0	0	0	0	35th
2019	Moto2	ONEXOX TKKR SAG Team	Kalex Moto2	45	(Japan) Tetsuta Nagashima	19	0	0	1	0	78	14th
2019	Moto2	ONEXOX TKKR SAG Team	Kalex Moto2	87	(Australia) Remy Gardner	18	0	1	1	1	77	15th
2020	Moto2	Onexox TKKR SAG Team	Kalex Moto2	87	(Australia) Remy Gardner	14	1	4	2	1	135	6th
2020	Moto2	Onexox TKKR SAG Team	Kalex Moto2	99	(Malaysia) Kasma Daniel	15	0	0	0	0	0	31st
2021	Moto2	Pertamina Mandalika SAG Team	Kalex Moto2	12	(Switzerland) Thomas Lüthi	17	0	0	0	0	27	22nd
2021	Moto2	Pertamina Mandalika SAG Team	Kalex Moto2	64	(Netherlands) Bo Bendsneyder	18	0	0	0	0	46	16th
2021	Moto2	Pertamina Mandalika SAG Team	Kalex Moto2	20	(Indonesia) Dimas Ekky Pratama	1	0	0	0	0	0	NC
2021	Moto2	Pertamina Mandalika SAG Euvic	Kalex Moto2	74	(Poland) Piotr Biesiekirski	3	0	0	0	0	0	41st
2021	Moto2	Pertamina Mandalika SAG Teluru	Kalex Moto2	29	(Japan) Taiga Hada	1 (2)	0	0	0	0	0	39th
2022	Moto2	Pertamina Mandalika SAG Team	Kalex Moto2	2	(Argentina) Gabriel Rodrigo	7	0	0	0	0	6	28th
2022	Moto2	Pertamina Mandalika SAG Team	Kalex Moto2	64	(Netherlands) Bo Bendsneyder	20	0	0	0	0	87	13th
2022	Moto2	Pertamina Mandalika SAG Team	Kalex Moto2	55	(Spain) Alex Toledo	3	0	0	0	0	0	40th
2022	Moto2	Pertamina Mandalika SAG Team	Kalex Moto2	74	(Poland) Piotr Biesiekirski	1	0	0	0	0	0	42nd
2022	Moto2	Pertamina Mandalika SAG Team	Kalex Moto2	74	(Poland) Piotr Biesiekirski	1	0	0	0	0	0	42nd
2022	Moto2	Pertamina Mandalika SAG Team	Kalex Moto2	29	(Japan) Taiga Hada	8	0	0	0	0	3.5	32nd
2023	Moto2	Pertamina Mandalika SAG Team	Kalex Moto2	19	(Italy) Lorenzo Dalla Porta	5 (7)	0	0	0	0	0	35th
2023	Moto2	Pertamina Mandalika SAG Team	Kalex Moto2	64	(Netherlands) Bo Bendsneyder	19	0	1	0	0	30	21st
2023	Moto2	Pertamina Mandalika SAG Team	Kalex Moto2	23	(Japan) Taiga Hada	13	0	0	0	0	4.5	26th
2023	Moto2	Pertamina Mandalika SAG Team	Kalex Moto2	73	(Italy) Mattia Rato	2	0	0	0	0	0	37th
2024	Moto2	Pertamina Mandalika Gas Up Team	Kalex Moto2	5	(Spain) Jaume Masià	20	0	0	0	0	6	28th
2024	Moto2	Pertamina Mandalika Gas Up Team	Kalex Moto2	64	(Netherlands) Bo Bendsneyder	10	0	0	0	0	7	25th
2024	Moto2	Pertamina Mandalika Gas Up Team	Kalex Moto2	17	(Spain) Daniel Muñoz	3	0	0	0	0	0	36th
2024	Moto2	Pertamina Mandalika Gas Up Team	Kalex Moto2	17	(Spain) Daniel Muñoz	3	0	0	0	0	0	36th
2024	Moto2	Pertamina Mandalika Gas Up Team	Kalex Moto2	17	(Spain) Daniel Muñoz	3	0	0	0	0	0	36th
2024	Moto2	Pertamina Mandalika Gas Up Team	Kalex Moto2	29	(Australia) Harrison Voight	3	0	0	0	0	0	35th

Key
Regular rider
Replacement rider
Wildcard rider
Replacement/wildcard rider

† – Rider deceased

Notes

* Season still in progress.
