= Xavier Artigas =

Spanish motorcycle racer

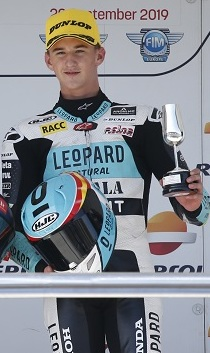
- Artigas in 2019
- Nationality: Spanish
- Born: 27 May 2003 (age 23); Sant Andreu de la Barca, Spain
- Current team: MTM Kawasaki
- Bike number: 34
Motorcycle racing career statistics
Moto2 World Championship
Active years	2024
Manufacturers	Forward
2024 championship position	25th (10 pts)
Starts / Wins / Podiums / Poles / F. laps / Points; 19 / 0 / 0 / 0 / 0 / 10
Moto3 World Championship
Active years	2019, 2021–2023
Manufacturers	Honda (2019, 2021); CFMoto (2022–2023)
Championships	0
2023 championship position	15th (77 pts)
Starts / Wins / Podiums / Poles / F. laps / Points; 57 / 1 / 3 / 0 / 2 / 248
Supersport World Championship
Active years	2025
Manufacturers	Kawasaki (2025); MV Agusta (2025)
2025 championship position	33rd (0 pts)
Starts / Wins / Podiums / Poles / F. laps / Points; 4 / 0 / 0 / 0 / 0 / 0

Xavier Artigas López (born 27 May 2003) is a Spanish motorcycle racer, who currently competes in the newly founded 2026 Sportbike World Championship for MTM Kawasaki. He has previously rode for the Forward Racing factory team in the 2024 Moto2 World Championship, and for Leopard Racing and Prüstel GP in Moto3 from 2021 to 2023.

== Career ==
=== Early career ===
==== 2018 ====
Artigas bought attention to himself in the 2018 Red Bull MotoGP Rookies Cup, where he won a race, came in second place three times, and finished third once. He finished third in the standings, behind Turkish twins Can Öncü and Deniz Öncü. He also was the 2018 European Talent Cup champion, in spite of not winning a race there.

==== 2019 ====
Artigas moved up to the Moto3 Junior World Championship for the 2019 season, and ended with one race win, one second place, and two third place podium finishes, once again finishing third in the standings. He made a wildcard appearance in the final race of Moto3 in 2019 and managed to score an impressive podium, finishing third in Valencia.

==== 2020 ====
Artigas stayed in the Junior World Championship for the 2020 season, and improved massively. Out of the 11 races held that year, he finished on the top-two steps of the podium in eight races (winning two, and runner up six times), ending the season second in the standings, and earning himself a seat with Leopard Racing for the 2021 Moto3 World Championship.

=== Moto3 World Championship ===
==== 2021 ====
Artigas' 2021 Moto3 season as a rookie was disappointing. The year began with three straight retirements, while his teammate Dennis Foggia was regularly at the front, scoring a podium in the third race. Artigas improved over the year, collecting regular point finishes, and in the last race of the season at Valencia, following Dennis Foggia and Pedro Acosta making contact on the last lap, Artigas was able to win the race. He finished the season with 72 points, 15th in the standings, and was not extended by Leopard Racing.

==== Prüstel GP (2022-2023) ====
For 2022, Artigas was contracted to ride for Prüstel GP, next to Carlos Tatay.

=== Moto2 World Championship ===
==== Forward Racing (2024) ====
Artigas joined the Forward Racing for 2024 season.

=== FIM Moto2 European Championship ===
==== Preicanos Racing Team (2025) ====
Artigas has actually officially joined the Preicanos Racing Team for the 2025 season to race in the FIM Moto2 European Championship. However, the contract failed due to the Preicanos team which then disbanded without any clarity.

=== World Superbike ===
==== Bimota by Kawasaki Racing Team (2025-) ====
Artigas was appointed as Bimota test riders for the 2025 WorldSBK season, as the Italian factory looked to develop its new KB998 bike.

== Career statistics ==
=== European Talent Cup ===
==== Races by year ====
(key) (Races in bold indicate pole position, races in italics indicate fastest lap)

Year	Bike	1	2	3	4	5	6	7	8	9	10	11	Pos	Pts
2017	Honda	ALB1	ALB2	CAT	VAL1	EST1	EST2	JER1	JER2	ARA1	ARA2	VAL2; 13	28th	3
2018	Honda	EST1; 4	EST2; 7	VAL1; Ret	VAL2; 7	CAT; 2	ARA1; 2	ARA2; 5	JER1; 2	JER2; 3	ALB; 5	VAL; 5	1st	140

=== Red Bull MotoGP Rookies Cup ===
==== Races by year ====
(key) (Races in bold indicate pole position, races in italics indicate fastest lap)

Year	1	2	3	4	5	6	7	8	9	10	11	12	13	Pos	Pts
2017	JER1; 11	JER2; 17	ASS1; 18	ASS2; 11	SAC1; 7	SAC2; 13	BRN1; 13	BRN2; NC	RBR1; 9	RBR2; 15	MIS; 15	ARA1; 14	ARA2; 11	16th	41
2018	JER1; 5	JER2; 15	MUG; 5	ASS1; 2	ASS2; 3	SAC1; 7	SAC2; 5	RBR1; 2	RBR2; 1	MIS; 5	**ARA1**; 2	**ARA2**; 5		3rd	166

=== FIM CEV Moto3 Junior World Championship ===
==== Races by year ====
(key) (Races in bold indicate pole position, races in italics indicate fastest lap)

Year	Bike	1	2	3	4	5	6	7	8	9	10	11	12	Pos	Pts
2019	Honda	EST; 2	VAL1; 5	VAL2; 4	FRA; 7	CAT1; Ret	CAT2; 3	ARA; 1	JER1; 3	JER2; 11	ALB; 6	VAL1; 5	VAL2; 4	3rd	149
2020	Honda	EST; 1	POR; 2	JER1; 1	JER2; 2	JER3; 8	ARA1; 2	ARA2; 5	ARA3; 2	VAL1; 21	VAL2; 2	VAL3; 2		2nd	189

=== FIM Moto2 European Championship ===
==== Races by year ====
(key) (Races in bold indicate pole position, races in italics indicate fastest lap)

Year	Bike	1	2	3	4	5	6	7	8	9	10	11	Pos	Pts
2024	Kalex	MIS	EST1	EST2	CAT1	CAT2	POR1	POR2	JER	ARA1	ARA2	EST; 4	21st	13
2025	Kalex	EST1	EST2	JER	MAG1	MAG2	ARA1	ARA2	MIS; Ret	CAT1	CAT2	VAL	NC*	0*

=== Grand Prix motorcycle racing ===
==== By season ====
Season	Class	Motorcycle	Team	Race	Win	Podium	Pole	FLap	Pts	Plcd
2019	Moto3	Honda	Leopard Impala Junior Team	1	0	1	0	0	16	26th
2021	Moto3	Honda	Leopard Racing	16	1	1	0	2	72	15th
2022	Moto3	CFMoto	CFMoto Racing Prüstel GP	20	0	0	0	0	83	16th
2023	Moto3	CFMoto	CFMoto Racing Prüstel GP	20	0	1	0	0	77	15th
2024	Moto2	Forward	Klint Forward Factory Team	19	0	0	0	0	10	25th
Total				**76**	**1**	**3**	**0**	**2**	**258**	

==== By class ====
Class	Seasons	1st GP	1st Pod	1st Win	Race	Win	Podiums	Pole	FLap	Pts	WChmp
Moto3	2019, 2021–2023	2019 Valencia	2019 Valencia	2021 Valencia	57	1	3	0	2	248	0
Moto2	2024	2024 Qatar			19	0	0	0	0	10	0
Total	2019, 2021–2024				**76**	**1**	**3**	**0**	**2**	**258**	**0**

==== Races by year ====
(key) (Races in bold indicate pole position, races in italics indicate fastest lap)

Year	Class	Bike	1	2	3	4	5	6	7	8	9	10	11	12	13	14	15	16	17	18	19	20	Pos	Pts
2019	Moto3	Honda	QAT	ARG	AME	SPA	FRA	ITA	CAT	NED	GER	CZE	AUT	GBR	RSM	ARA	THA	JPN	AUS	MAL	VAL; 3		26th	16
2021	Moto3	Honda	QAT; Ret	DOH; Ret	POR; Ret	SPA; 9	FRA; 7	ITA; 16	CAT; Ret	GER; 9	NED; 9	STY; DNS	AUT	GBR; 18	ARA; Ret	RSM; Ret	AME; 14	EMI; 9	ALR; 8	VAL; 1			15th	72
2022	Moto3	CFMoto	QAT; 10	INA; 6	ARG; Ret	AME; 6	POR; 20	SPA; 5	FRA; Ret	ITA; 20	CAT; 10	GER; 13	NED; 5	GBR; 11	AUT; 14	RSM; 20	ARA; 11	JPN; 11	THA; 14	AUS; 14	MAL; 11	VAL; 23	16th	83
2023	Moto3	CFMoto	POR; 8	ARG; 8	AME; 3	SPA; 7	FRA; 7	ITA; Ret	GER; 11	NED; 14	GBR; 21	AUT; 19	CAT; 12	RSM; 17	IND; 12	JPN; Ret	INA; 19	AUS; 16	THA; 14	MAL; 6	QAT; 20	VAL; 19	15th	77
2024	Moto2	Forward	QAT; 27	POR; DNS	AME; 25	SPA; 20	FRA; Ret	CAT; 20	ITA; 25	NED; 23	GER; 23	GBR; 23	AUT; 25	ARA; Ret	RSM; 26	EMI; 22	INA; 20	JPN; 6	AUS; 19	THA; 21	MAL; 22	SLD; 23	25th	10

=== Supersport World Championship ===
==== By season ====
Season	Motorcycle	Team	No	Race	Win	Podium	Pole	FLap	Pts	Plcd
2025	Kawasaki Ninja ZX-6R	Black Flag Motorsport WorldSSP Team	14	2	0	0	0	0	0	33rd
2025	MV Agusta F3 800 RR	Motozoo ME air racing	14	2	0	0	0	0	0	33rd
Total				**4**	**0**	**0**	**0**	**0**	**0**	

==== By year ====
(key) (Races in bold indicate pole position; races in italics indicate fastest lap)

Year	Bike	1		2		3		4		5		6		7		8		9		10		11		12		Pos	Pts
Year	Bike	R1	R2	R1	R2	R1	R2	R1	R2	R1	R2	R1	R2	R1	R2	R1	R2	R1	R2	R1	R2	R1	R2	R1	R2	Pos	Pts
2025	Kawasaki	AUS	AUS	POR	POR	NED	NED	ITA	ITA	CZE	CZE	EMI; 20	EMI; 16	GBR	GBR	HUN	HUN	FRA	FRA	ARA	ARA					33rd	0
2025	MV Agusta																					POR; 16	POR; Ret	SPA; DNS	SPA; DNS	33rd	0

=== Sportbike World Championship ===
==== Races by year ====
(key) (Races in bold indicate pole position; races in italics indicate fastest lap)

Year	Bike	1		2		3		4		5		6		7		8		Pos	Pts
Year	Bike	R1	R2	R1	R2	R1	R2	R1	R2	R1	R2	R1	R2	R1	R2	R1	R2	Pos	Pts
2026	Kawasaki	POR; 5	POR; 4	NED; 2	NED; 6	CZE; 6	CZE; Ret	ARA; 2	ARA; 1	EMI; 7	EMI; 5	FRA; 4	FRA; 1	ITA; 1	ITA; 2	SPA; 1	SPA; 8	1st	245

=== Suzuka 8 Hours ===
Year	Class	Team	Co-riders	Bike	Pos
2026	**EWC**	Team Bolliger Switzerland #8	(Austria) Nico Thöni (Spain) Álex Toledo	Kawasaki ZX-10R	21st
