= 2021 Doha motorcycle Grand Prix =

Second round of the 2021 Grand Prix motorcycle racing season

(Qatar) 2021 Doha Grand Prix
Race details
- Race 2 of 18 races in the 2021 Grand Prix motorcycle racing season
- Date: 4 April 2021
- Official name: Tissot Grand Prix of Doha
- Location: Losail International Circuit; Lusail, Qatar
- Course: Permanent racing facility; 5.380 km (3.343 mi)

MotoGP
Pole position
Rider	(Spain) Jorge Martín	Ducati
Time	1:53.106	
Fastest lap
Rider	(Italy) Francesco Bagnaia	Ducati
Time	1:54.491 on lap 7	
Podium
First	(France) Fabio Quartararo	Yamaha
Second	(France) Johann Zarco	Ducati
Third	(Spain) Jorge Martín	Ducati

Moto2
Pole position
Rider	(United Kingdom) Sam Lowes	Kalex
Time	1:59.055	
Fastest lap
Rider	(United Kingdom) Sam Lowes	Kalex
Time	1:58.954 on lap 20	
Podium
First	(United Kingdom) Sam Lowes	Kalex
Second	(Australia) Remy Gardner	Kalex
Third	(Spain) Raúl Fernández	Kalex

Moto3
Pole position
Rider	(Spain) Jaume Masiá	KTM
Time	2:05.913	
Fastest lap
Rider	(Italy) Stefano Nepa	KTM
Time	2:06.232 on lap 5	
Podium
First	(Spain) Pedro Acosta	KTM
Second	(South Africa) Darryn Binder	Honda
Third	(Italy) Niccolò Antonelli	KTM

The 2021 Doha motorcycle Grand Prix (officially known as the Tissot Grand Prix of Doha) was the second round of the 2021 Grand Prix motorcycle racing season. It was added to the calendar as a response to the COVID-19 pandemic. It was held at the Losail International Circuit in Lusail on 4 April 2021.

== Background ==
=== Impact of the COVID-19 pandemic ===
On 22 January 2021 Dorna announced a significant update of the provisional calendar following the postponement of the Argentine and American Grands Prix, originally scheduled as the second and third rounds of the championship (on 11 and 18 April respectively) due to the COVID-19 situation in both countries, with potential rescheduling for the last quarter of 2021. The organizers of the Qatar Grand Prix have signed a contract with Dorna Sports, owner of the sport's commercial rights, to host a double stage at the Losail International Circuit, becoming the sixth circuit in the history to host two consecutive World Championship races, and is the first time to be held in Qatar. The race is named after the city of Doha, where the circuit is located just outside the city of Lusail, north of Doha.

=== MotoGP Championship standings before the race ===
After winning the Qatar Grand Prix, Maverick Viñales leads the riders' ranking with 25 points, followed by Johann Zarco (20), Francesco Bagnaia (16), Joan Mir (13) and Fabio Quartararo (11).

In the constructors' classification, Yamaha is first at 25 points, followed by Ducati at 20 points. Suzuki is third at 13 points, with Aprilia and Honda following with 9 and 8 points respectively. KTM closes with 3 points.

In the team championship standings, Monster Energy Yamaha leads with 36 points, 13 more than Ducati Lenovo Team and Team Suzuki Ecstar and 15 more than Pramac Racing. Repsol Honda Team is fifth at 13 points.

=== Moto2 Championship riders' standings before the race ===
After the first race of the season, Sam Lowes leads the intermediate class with 25 points, 5 more than Remy Gardner, 9 more than Fabio Di Giannantonio, 12 more than Marco Bezzecchi and 14 more than Raúl Fernández.

=== Moto3 Championship riders' standings before the race ===
In the lightest class the top five places are occupied by Jaume Masiá, with 25 points, Pedro Acosta (20), Darryn Binder (16), Sergio García (13) and Gabriel Rodrigo (11).

=== MotoGP participants ===
Stefan Bradl replaced Marc Márquez in the second leg of the season as well, as Márquez extended his recovery from the end-of-season 2020 injury.

=== Moto2 participants ===
Tommaso Marcon replaced Simone Corsi for this round because of an injury.

=== Moto3 participants ===
The drivers and teams were the same as the season entry list with no additional stand-in riders for the race.

== Free practice ==
=== MotoGP ===
In the first session, Aleix Espargaró finished at the top of the standings ahead of Álex Rins and Maverick Viñales. In the second session three Ducatis were the fastest, with Jack Miller the fastest, followed by Francesco Bagnaia and Johann Zarco. In the third session, Fabio Quartararo was the best ahead of Rins and Joan Mir's Suzuki

=== Combined Free Practice 1-2-3 ===
The top ten bikers (written in bold) qualified in Q2.

Fastest session lap

The fastest personal time of the bikers are written in bold type.

Pos.	No.	Bikers	Constructor	Free practice times		
Pos.	No.	Bikers	Constructor	FP1	FP2	FP3
1	43	(Australia) **Jack Miller**	**Ducati**	1:55.984	1:53.145	No time
2	63	(Italy) **Francesco Bagnaia**	**Ducati**	1:56.119	1:53.458	1:57.335
3	5	(France) **Johann Zarco**	**Ducati**	1:56.743	1:53.537	No time
4	20	(France) **Fabio Quartararo**	**Yamaha**	1:55.303	1:53.583	1:56.064
5	89	(Spain) **Jorge Martín**	**Ducati**	1:55.019	1:53.593	No time
6	41	(Spain) **Aleix Espargaró**	**Aprilia**	1:54.779	1:53.646	1:58.633
7	21	(Italy) **Franco Morbidelli**	**Yamaha**	1:55.125	1:53.699	1:56.660
8	42	(Spain) **Álex Rins**	**Suzuki**	1:54.839	1:53.713	1:56.347
9	12	(Spain) **Maverick Viñales**	**Yamaha**	1:54.864	1:53.872	1:56.647
10	6	(Germany) **Stefan Bradl**	**Honda**	1:55.393	1:53.914	1:57.450
11	88	(Portugal) Miguel Oliveira	KTM	1:55.770	1:53.944	1:56.855
12	9	(Italy) Danilo Petrucci	KTM	1:55.263	1:53.969	1:56.614
13	36	(Spain) Joan Mir	Suzuki	1:55.349	1:54.012	1:56.450
14	46	(Italy) Valentino Rossi	Yamaha	1:55.925	1:54.112	1:56.718
15	30	(Japan) Takaaki Nakagami	Honda	1:55.448	1:54.127	2:03.348
16	73	(Spain) Álex Márquez	Honda	1:55.597	1:54.148	1:56.701
17	44	(Spain) Pol Espargaró	Honda	1:55.507	1:54.205	1:56.789
18	33	(South Africa) Brad Binder	KTM	1:55.846	1:54.237	1:56.933
19	23	(Italy) Enea Bastianini	Ducati	1:55.677	1:54.516	1:56.668
20	10	(Italy) Luca Marini	Ducati	1:55.454	1:54.680	No time
21	32	(Italy) Lorenzo Savadori	Aprilia	1:56.561	1:54.971	1:57.378
22	27	(Spain) Iker Lecuona	KTM	1:56.023	1:55.369	1:56.981
OFFICIAL MOTOGP COMBINED FREE PRACTICE TIMES REPORT

=== Free Practice 4 ===
Zarco was the fastest of the session, ahead of Viñales and Mir.

=== Moto2 ===
In the first session, Fabio Di Giannantonio was the fastest, followed by Marco Bezzecchi and Joe Roberts. In the second session, Raúl Fernández preceded Di Giannantonio and Roberts. In the third session Sam Lowes finished at the top of the standings, ahead of Bezzecchi and Remy Gardner.

=== Combined Free Practice ===
The top fourteen bikers (written in bold) qualified in Q2.

Fastest session lap

The fastest personal time of the bikers are written in bold type.

Pos.	No.	Bikers	Constructor	Free practice times		
Pos.	No.	Bikers	Constructor	FP1	FP2	FP3
1	25	(Spain) **Raúl Fernández**	**Kalex**	2:00.439	1:58.541	2:02.547
2	21	(Italy) **Fabio Di Giannantonio**	**Kalex**	1:59.931	1:59.058	2:01.384
3	87	(Australia) **Remy Gardner**	**Kalex**	2:01.269	1:59.188	2:01.127
4	72	(Italy) **Marco Bezzecchi**	**Kalex**	1:59.976	1:59.208	2:01.021
5	16	(United States) **Joe Roberts**	**Kalex**	2:00.094	1:59.213	2:01.667
6	79	(Japan) **Ai Ogura**	**Kalex**	2:00.539	1:59.243	2:01.973
7	22	(United Kingdom) **Sam Lowes**	**Kalex**	2:00.132	1:59.265	2:00.878
8	13	(Italy) **Celestino Vietti**	**Kalex**	2:00.845	1:59.315	2:02.102
9	23	(Germany) **Marcel Schrötter**	**Kalex**	2:00.737	1:59.362	2:01.528
10	11	(Italy) **Nicolò Bulega**	**Kalex**	2:00.724	1:59.607	2:02.799
11	62	(Italy) **Stefano Manzi**	**Kalex**	2:01.006	1:59.613	2:01.724
12	44	(Spain) **Arón Canet**	**Boscoscuro**	2:00.538	1:59.664	2:01.154
13	37	(Spain) **Augusto Fernández**	**Kalex**	2:00.970	1:59.748	2:01.674
14	6	(United States) **Cameron Beaubier**	**Kalex**	2:01.144	1:59.777	2:01.201
15	97	(Spain) Xavi Vierge	Kalex	2:00.582	1:59.782	2:01.349
16	35	(Thailand) Somkiat Chantra	Kalex	2:01.453	1:59.785	2:02.652
17	9	(Spain) Jorge Navarro	Boscoscuro	2:00.766	1:59.792	2:02.577
18	96	(United Kingdom) Jake Dixon	Kalex	2:01.101	1:59.861	2:01.439
19	12	(Switzerland) Thomas Lüthi	Kalex	2:01.159	1:59.896	2:02.363
20	64	(Netherlands) Bo Bendsneyder	Kalex	2:00.897	1:59.907	2:02.195
21	14	(Italy) Tony Arbolino	Kalex	2:01.123	1:59.915	2:01.186
22	19	(Italy) Lorenzo Dalla Porta	Kalex	2:00.866	1:59.981	2:02.086
23	5	(Italy) Yari Montella	Boscoscuro	2:01.452	2:00.244	2:01.921
24	75	(Spain) Albert Arenas	Boscoscuro	2:00.907	2:00.377	2:01.692
25	40	(Spain) Héctor Garzó	Kalex	2:00.941	2:00.385	2:02.414
26	7	(Italy) Lorenzo Baldassarri	MV Agusta	2:01.480	2:00.586	2:02.074
27	55	(Malaysia) Hafizh Syahrin	NTS	2:01.826	2:00.858	2:03.197
28	10	(Italy) Tommaso Marcon	MV Agusta	2:06.775	2:02.760	2:04.514
OFFICIAL MOTO2 COMBINED FREE PRACTICE TIMES REPORT

=== Moto3 ===
In the first session, Jaume Masiá was the fastest, followed by Dennis Foggia and Filip Salač. In the second session, Darryn Binder finished at the top, with Sergio García and Gabriel Rodrigo second and third respectively. Jason Dupasquier was fastest in the third session, ahead of Foggia and John McPhee.

=== Combined Free Practice ===
The top fourteen bikers (written in bold) qualified in Q2.

Fastest session lap

The fastest personal time of the bikers are written in bold type.

Pos.	No.	Bikers	Constructor	Free practice times		
Pos.	No.	Bikers	Constructor	FP1	FP2	FP3
1	40	(South Africa) **Darryn Binder**	**Honda**	2:06.821	2:04.781	2:07.814
2	11	(Spain) **Sergio García**	**Gas Gas**	2:06.956	2:04.821	2:08.873
3	2	(Argentina) **Gabriel Rodrigo**	**Honda**	2:07.184	2:04.893	2:08.447
4	17	(United Kingdom) **John McPhee**	**Honda**	2:06.215	2:04.968	2:07.557
5	24	(Japan) **Tatsuki Suzuki**	**Honda**	2:07.398	2:05.023	2:08.424
6	5	(Spain) **Jaume Masiá**	**KTM**	2:05.360	2:05.078	2:08.234
7	28	(Spain) **Izan Guevara**	**Gas Gas**	2:06.778	2:05.104	2:07.625
8	52	(Spain) **Jeremy Alcoba**	**Honda**	2:07.845	2:05.143	2:08.492
9	37	(Spain) **Pedro Acosta**	**KTM**	2:07.029	2:05.169	2:08.055
10	55	(Italy) **Romano Fenati**	**Husqvarna**	2:06.710	2:05.271	2:08.721
11	82	(Italy) **Stefano Nepa**	**KTM**	2:07.002	2:05.329	2:08.235
12	6	(Japan) **Ryusei Yamanaka**	**KTM**	2:06.929	2:05.392	2:08.313
13	27	(Japan) **Kaito Toba**	**KTM**	2:06.675	2:05.397	2:08.463
14	23	(Italy) **Niccolò Antonelli**	**KTM**	2:07.518	2:05.412	2:07.788
15	7	(Italy) Dennis Foggia	Honda	2:05.922	2:05.421	2:07.407
16	31	(Spain) Adrián Fernández	Husqvarna	2:06.874	2:05.438	2:09.018
17	50	(Switzerland) Jason Dupasquier	KTM	2:07.081	2:05.507	2:07.244
18	92	(Japan) Yuki Kunii	Honda	2:06.397	2:05.526	2:08.693
19	12	(Czech Republic) Filip Salač	Honda	2:06.155	2:05.537	2:08.252
20	16	(Italy) Andrea Migno	Honda	2:06.989	2:05.549	2:07.907
21	99	(Spain) Carlos Tatay	KTM	2:07.347	2:05.655	2:08.522
22	73	(Austria) Maximilian Kofler	KTM	2:06.789	2:05.655	2:09.211
23	43	(Spain) Xavier Artigas	Honda	2:06.536	2:05.881	2:07.722
24	54	(Italy) Riccardo Rossi	KTM	2:06.810	2:05.924	2:09.539
25	53	(Turkey) Deniz Öncü	KTM	2:06.860	2:06.142	2:08.689
26	19	(Indonesia) Andi Farid Izdihar	Honda	2:06.279	2:06.219	2:10.266
27	71	(Japan) Ayumu Sasaki	KTM	2:07.708	2:06.253	2:08.547
28	20	(France) Lorenzo Fellon	Honda	2:07.086	2:06.816	2:08.635
OFFICIAL MOTO3 COMBINED FREE PRACTICE TIMES REPORT

== Qualifying ==
=== MotoGP ===
Fastest session lap

Pos.	No.	Biker	Constructor	Qualifying times		Final grid	Row
Pos.	No.	Biker	Constructor	Q1	Q2	Final grid	Row
1	89	(Spain) Jorge Martín	Ducati	Qualified in Q2	1:53.106	1	1
2	5	(France) Johann Zarco	Ducati	Qualified in Q2	1:53.263	2	1
3	12	(Spain) Maverick Viñales	Yamaha	Qualified in Q2	1:53.267	3	1
4	43	(Australia) Jack Miller	Ducati	Qualified in Q2	1:53.303	4	2
5	20	(France) Fabio Quartararo	Yamaha	Qualified in Q2	1:53.469	5	2
6	63	(Italy) Francesco Bagnaia	Ducati	Qualified in Q2	1:53.654	6	2
7	41	(Spain) Aleix Espargaró	Aprilia	Qualified in Q2	1:53.705	7	3
8	42	(Spain) Álex Rins	Suzuki	Qualified in Q2	1:53.745	8	3
9	36	(Spain) Joan Mir	Suzuki	1:53.931	1:53.785	9	3
10	21	(Italy) Franco Morbidelli	Yamaha	Qualified in Q2	1:53.794	10	4
11	6	(Germany) Stefan Bradl	Honda	Qualified in Q2	1:54.224	11	4
12	88	(Portugal) Miguel Oliveira	KTM	1:54.220	1:55.096	12	4
13	10	(Italy) Luca Marini	Ducati	1:54.228	N/A	13	5
14	73	(Spain) Álex Márquez	Honda	1:54.261	N/A	14	5
15	44	(Spain) Pol Espargaró	Honda	1:54.402	N/A	15	5
16	30	(Japan) Takaaki Nakagami	Honda	1:54.481	N/A	16	6
17	9	(Italy) Danilo Petrucci	KTM	1:54.528	N/A	17	6
18	33	(South Africa) Brad Binder	KTM	1:54.555	N/A	18	6
19	23	(Italy) Enea Bastianini	Ducati	1:54.632	N/A	19	7
20	27	(Spain) Iker Lecuona	KTM	1:54.731	N/A	20	7
21	46	(Italy) Valentino Rossi	Yamaha	1:54.881	N/A	21	7
22	32	(Italy) Lorenzo Savadori	Aprilia	1:55.823	N/A	22	8
OFFICIAL MOTOGP QUALIFYING RESULTS

=== Moto2 ===
Fastest session lap

Pos.	No.	Biker	Constructor	Qualifying times		Final grid	Row
Pos.	No.	Biker	Constructor	Q1	Q2	Final grid	Row
1	22	(United Kingdom) Sam Lowes	Kalex	Qualified in Q2	1:59.055	1	1
2	87	(Australia) Remy Gardner	Kalex	Qualified in Q2	1:59.192	2	1
3	72	(Italy) Marco Bezzecchi	Kalex	Qualified in Q2	1:59.327	3	1
4	25	(Spain) Raúl Fernández	Kalex	Qualified in Q2	1:59.441	4	2
5	96	(United Kingdom) Jake Dixon	Kalex	1:59.987	1:59.443	5	2
6	79	(Japan) Ai Ogura	Kalex	Qualified in Q2	1:59.692	6	2
7	21	(Italy) Fabio Di Giannantonio	Kalex	Qualified in Q2	1:59.696	7	3
8	16	(United States) Joe Roberts	Kalex	Qualified in Q2	1:59.727	8	3
9	44	(Spain) Arón Canet	Boscoscuro	Qualified in Q2	1:59.785	9	3
10	37	(Spain) Augusto Fernández	Kalex	Qualified in Q2	1:59.809	10	4
11	62	(Italy) Stefano Manzi	Kalex	Qualified in Q2	1:59.870	11	4
12	75	(Spain) Albert Arenas	Boscoscuro	1:59.913	1:59.885	12	4
13	11	(Italy) Nicolò Bulega	Kalex	Qualified in Q2	2:00.012	13	5
14	6	(United States) Cameron Beaubier	Kalex	Qualified in Q2	2:00.040	14	5
15	64	(Netherlands) Bo Bendsneyder	Kalex	1:59.827	2:00.077	15	5
16	23	(Germany) Marcel Schrotter	Kalex	Qualified in Q2	2:00.108	16	6
17	9	(Spain) Jorge Navarro	Boscoscuro	1:59.592	2:00.142	17	6
18	13	(Italy) Celestino Vietti	Kalex	Qualified in Q2	2:00.532	18	6
19	97	(Spain) Xavi Vierge	Kalex	2:00.091	N/A	19	7
20	14	(Italy) Tony Arbolino	Kalex	2:00.092	N/A	20	7
21	12	(Switzerland) Thomas Lüthi	Kalex	2:00.131	N/A	21	7
22	5	(Italy) Yari Montella	Boscoscuro	2:00.232	N/A	22	8
23	35	(Thailand) Somkiat Chantra	Kalex	2:00.448	N/A	23	8
24	19	(Italy) Lorenzo Dalla Porta	Kalex	2:00.581	N/A	24	8
25	7	(Italy) Lorenzo Baldassarri	MV Agusta	2:00.738	N/A	25	9
26	40	(Spain) Héctor Garzó	Kalex	2:00.929	N/A	26	9
27	55	(Malaysia) Hafizh Syahrin	NTS	2:01.466	N/A	27	9
28	10	(Italy) Tommaso Marcon	MV Agusta	2:03.113	N/A	28	10
OFFICIAL MOTO2 QUALIFYING RESULTS

=== Moto3 ===
Fastest session lap

Pos.	No.	Biker	Constructor	Qualifying times		Final grid	Row
Pos.	No.	Biker	Constructor	Q1	Q2	Final grid	Row
1	5	(Spain) Jaume Masiá	KTM	Qualified in Q2	2:05.913	1	1
2	11	(Spain) Sergio García	Gas Gas	Qualified in Q2	2:06.012	Pit lane^{1}	
3	52	(Spain) Jeremy Alcoba	Honda	Qualified in Q2	2:06.158	2	1
4	2	(Argentina) Gabriel Rodrigo	Honda	Qualified in Q2	2:06.346	3	1
5	24	(Japan) Tatsuki Suzuki	Honda	Qualified in Q2	2:06.407	4	2
6	16	(Italy) Andrea Migno	Honda	2:06.925	2:06.619	5	2
7	40	(South Africa) Darryn Binder	Honda	Qualified in Q2	2:06.643	6	2
8	17	(United Kingdom) John McPhee	Honda	Qualified in Q2	2:06.646	7	3
9	37	(Spain) Pedro Acosta	KTM	Qualified in Q2	2:06.829	Pitlane^{1}	
10	28	(Spain) Izan Guevara	Gas Gas	Qualified in Q2	2:06.833	8	3
11	50	(Switzerland) Jason Dupasquier	KTM	2:07.354	2:06.967	9	3
12	23	(Italy) Niccolò Antonelli	KTM	Qualified in Q2	2:07.025	10	4
13	27	(Japan) Kaito Toba	KTM	Qualified in Q2	2:07.108	11	4
14	55	(Italy) Romano Fenati	Husqvarna	Qualified in Q2	2:07.145	Pit lane^{1}	
15	82	(Italy) Stefano Nepa	KTM	Qualified in Q2	2:07.197	Pit lane^{1}	
16	43	(Spain) Xavier Artigas	Honda	2:07.043	2:07.252	12	4
17	6	(Japan) Ryusei Yamanaka	KTM	Qualified in Q2	2:07.429	13	5
18	7	(Italy) Dennis Foggia	Honda	2:07.034	2:07.498	Pitlane^{1}	
19	31	(Spain) Adrián Fernández	Husqvarna	2:07.541	N/A	14	5
20	12	(Czech Republic) Filip Salač	Honda	2:07.661	N/A	15	5
21	20	(France) Lorenzo Fellon	Honda	2:07.749	N/A	16	6
22	71	(Japan) Ayumu Sasaki	KTM	2:07.948	N/A	17	6
23	54	(Italy) Riccardo Rossi	KTM	2:07.994	N/A	Pit lane^{1}	
24	99	(Spain) Carlos Tatay	KTM	2:08.011	N/A	18	6
25	92	(Japan) Yuki Kunii	Honda	2:08.011	N/A	19	7
26	73	(Austria) Maximilian Kofler	KTM	2:08.233	N/A	20	7
27	19	(Indonesia) Andi Farid Izdihar	Honda	2:08.469	N/A	21	7
28	53	(Turkey) Deniz Öncü	KTM	No time	N/A	Pit lane^{1}	
OFFICIAL MOTO3 QUALIFYING RESULTS

Notes

- ^1 – Sergio García, Pedro Acosta, Romano Fenati, Stefano Nepa, Dennis Foggia, Riccardo Rossi and Deniz Öncü received a pit lane start penalty for irresponsible driving in the FP2.

== Warm up ==
=== MotoGP ===
Johann Zarco was the fastest, followed by Fabio Quartararo and Maverick Viñales.

=== Moto2 ===
Marco Bezzecchi finished the warm up in the lead ahead of Marcel Schrotter and Remy Gardner.

=== Moto3 ===
Jaume Masiá preceded Andrea Migno and Gabriel Rodrigo.

== Race ==
=== MotoGP ===
Pos.	No.	Rider	Team	Manufacturer	Laps	Time/Retired	Grid	Points
1	20	(France) Fabio Quartararo	Monster Energy Yamaha MotoGP	Yamaha	22	42:23.997	5	25
2	5	(France) Johann Zarco	Pramac Racing	Ducati	22	+1.457	2	20
3	89	(Spain) Jorge Martín	Pramac Racing	Ducati	22	+1.500	1	16
4	42	(Spain) Álex Rins	Team Suzuki Ecstar	Suzuki	22	+2.088	8	13
5	12	(Spain) Maverick Viñales	Monster Energy Yamaha MotoGP	Yamaha	22	+2.110	3	11
6	63	(Italy) Francesco Bagnaia	Ducati Lenovo Team	Ducati	22	+2.642	6	10
7	36	(Spain) Joan Mir	Team Suzuki Ecstar	Suzuki	22	+4.868	9	9
8	33	(South Africa) Brad Binder	Red Bull KTM Factory Racing	KTM	22	+4.979	18	8
9	43	(Australia) Jack Miller	Ducati Lenovo Team	Ducati	22	+5.365	4	7
10	41	(Spain) Aleix Espargaró	Aprilia Racing Team Gresini	Aprilia	22	+5.382	7	6
11	23	(Italy) Enea Bastianini	Esponsorama Racing	Ducati	22	+5.550	19	5
12	21	(Italy) Franco Morbidelli	Petronas Yamaha SRT	Yamaha	22	+5.787	10	4
13	44	(Spain) Pol Espargaró	Repsol Honda Team	Honda	22	+6.063	15	3
14	6	(Germany) Stefan Bradl	Repsol Honda Team	Honda	22	+6.453	11	2
15	88	(Portugal) Miguel Oliveira	Red Bull KTM Factory Racing	KTM	22	+8.928	12	1
16	46	(Italy) Valentino Rossi	Petronas Yamaha SRT	Yamaha	22	+14.246	21	
17	30	(Japan) Takaaki Nakagami	LCR Honda Idemitsu	Honda	22	+16.241	16	
18	10	(Italy) Luca Marini	Sky VR46 Esponsorama	Ducati	22	+16.472	13	
19	9	(Italy) Danilo Petrucci	Tech3 KTM Factory Racing	KTM	22	+16.779	17	
20	32	(Italy) Lorenzo Savadori	Aprilia Racing Team Gresini	Aprilia	22	+38.775	22	
Ret	73	(Spain) Álex Márquez	LCR Honda Castrol	Honda	12	Accident	14	
Ret	27	(Spain) Iker Lecuona	Tech3 KTM Factory Racing	KTM	12	Accident	20	
Fastest lap: (Italy) Francesco Bagnaia (Ducati) – 1:54.491 (lap 7)

=== Moto2 ===
Pos.	No.	Biker	Constructor	Laps	Time/Retired	Grid	Points
1	22	(United Kingdom) Sam Lowes	Kalex	20	39:52.702	1	25
2	87	(Australia) Remy Gardner	Kalex	20	+0.190	2	20
3	25	(Spain) Raúl Fernández	Kalex	20	+3.371	4	16
4	72	(Italy) Marco Bezzecchi	Kalex	20	+6.789	3	13
5	79	(Japan) Ai Ogura	Kalex	20	+16.640	6	11
6	37	(Spain) Augusto Fernández	Kalex	20	+16.887	10	10
7	13	(Italy) Celestino Vietti	Kalex	20	+17.254	18	9
8	62	(Italy) Stefano Manzi	Kalex	20	+17.283	11	8
9	97	(Spain) Xavi Vierge	Kalex	20	+17.515	19	7
10	21	(Italy) Fabio Di Giannantonio	Kalex	20	+18.167	7	6
11	14	(Italy) Tony Arbolino	Kalex	20	+18.180	20	5
12	64	(Netherlands) Bo Bendsneyder	Kalex	20	+20.696	15	4
13	9	(Spain) Jorge Navarro	Boscoscuro	20	+22.016	17	3
14	19	(Italy) Lorenzo Dalla Porta	Kalex	20	+22.043	24	2
15	75	(Spain) Albert Arenas	Boscoscuro	20	+26.266	12	1
16	40	(Spain) Héctor Garzó	Kalex	20	+28.539	26	
17	11	(Italy) Nicolò Bulega	Kalex	20	+29.310	13	
18	5	(Italy) Yari Montella	Boscoscuro	20	+33.150	22	
19	35	(Thailand) Somkiat Chantra	Kalex	20	+39.838	23	
20	7	(Italy) Lorenzo Baldassarri	MV Agusta	20	+44.961	25	
21	55	(Malaysia) Hafizh Syahrin	NTS	20	+56.123	27	
Ret	44	(Spain) Arón Canet	Boscoscuro	14	Accident	9	
Ret	96	(United Kingdom) Jake Dixon	Kalex	12	Collision	5	
Ret	23	(Germany) Marcel Schrötter	Kalex	12	Collision	16	
Ret	12	(Switzerland) Thomas Lüthi	Kalex	12	Accident	21	
Ret	6	(United States) Cameron Beaubier	Kalex	8	Accident	14	
Ret	10	(Italy) Tommaso Marcon	MV Agusta	8	Electronics	28	
Ret	16	(United States) Joe Roberts	Kalex	6	Accident	8	
WD	42	(Spain) Marcos Ramírez	Kalex		Withdrew		
Fastest lap: (United Kingdom) Sam Lowes (Kalex) – 1:58.954 (lap 20)
OFFICIAL MOTO2 RACE REPORT

=== Moto3 ===
Pos.	No.	Biker	Constructor	Laps	Time/Retired	Grid	Points
1	37	(Spain) Pedro Acosta	KTM	18	38:22.430	Pit lane	25
2	40	(South Africa) Darryn Binder	Honda	18	+0.039	6	20
3	23	(Italy) Niccolò Antonelli	KTM	18	+0.482	10	16
4	16	(Italy) Andrea Migno	Honda	18	+0.514	5	13
5	27	(Japan) Kaito Toba	KTM	18	+0.651	11	11
6	28	(Spain) Izan Guevara	Gas Gas	18	+0.708	8	10
7	71	(Japan) Ayumu Sasaki	KTM	18	+1.805	17	9
8	6	(Japan) Ryusei Yamanaka	KTM	18	+1.857	13	8
9	5	(Spain) Jaume Masiá	KTM	18	+1.875	1	7
10	55	(Italy) Romano Fenati	Husqvarna	18	+1.967	Pit lane	6
11	50	(Switzerland) Jason Dupasquier	KTM	18	+1.994	9	5
12	24	(Japan) Tatsuki Suzuki	Honda	18	+2.234	4	4
13	2	(Argentina) Gabriel Rodrigo	Honda	18	+2.235	3	3
14	73	(Austria) Maximilian Kofler	KTM	18	+2.249	20	2
15	92	(Japan) Yuki Kunii	Honda	18	+2.260	19	1
16	82	(Italy) Stefano Nepa	KTM	18	+5.359	Pit lane	
17	7	(Italy) Dennis Foggia	Honda	18	+11.052	Pit lane	
18	53	(Turkey) Deniz Öncü	KTM	18	+11.085	Pit lane	
19	54	(Italy) Riccardo Rossi	KTM	18	+15.996	Pit lane	
20	20	(France) Lorenzo Fellon	Honda	18	+17.130	16	
21	99	(Spain) Carlos Tatay	KTM	18	+18.480	18	
22	19	(Indonesia) Andi Farid Izdihar	Honda	18	+25.872	21	
23	11	(Spain) Sergio García	Gas Gas	18	+41.914	Pit lane	
Ret	17	(United Kingdom) John McPhee	Honda	14	Collision	7	
Ret	52	(Spain) Jeremy Alcoba	Honda	14	Collision	2	
Ret	31	(Spain) Adrián Fernández	Husqvarna	14	Collision Damage	14	
Ret	12	(Czech Republic) Filip Salač	Honda	12	Collision	15	
Ret	43	(Spain) Xavier Artigas	Honda	11	Collision Damage	12	
Fastest lap: (Italy) Stefano Nepa (KTM) – 2:06.232 (lap 5)
OFFICIAL MOTO3 RACE REPORT

== Championship standings after the race ==
Below are the standings for the top five riders, constructors, and teams after the round.

=== MotoGP ===
Riders' Championship standings

	Pos.	Biker	Points
1	1	(France) Johann Zarco	40
3	2	(France) Fabio Quartararo	36
2	3	(Spain) Maverick Viñales	36
1	4	(Italy) Francesco Bagnaia	26
1	5	(Spain) Álex Rins	23

Constructors' Championship standings

	Pos.	Constructor	Points
	1	(Japan) Yamaha	50
	2	(Italy) Ducati	40
	3	(Japan) Suzuki	26
	4	(Italy) Aprilia	15
1	5	(Austria) KTM	11

Teams' Championship standings

	Pos.	Team	Points
	1	(Japan) Monster Energy Yamaha MotoGP	72
2	2	(Italy) Pramac Racing	57
	3	(Japan) Team Suzuki Ecstar	45
2	4	(Italy) Ducati Lenovo Team	40
	5	(Japan) Repsol Honda Team	18

=== Moto2 ===
Riders' Championship standings

	Pos.	Biker	Points
	1	(United Kingdom) Sam Lowes	50
	2	(Australia) Remy Gardner	40
2	3	(Spain) Raúl Fernández	27
	4	(Italy) Marco Bezzecchi	26
2	5	(Italy) Fabio Di Giannantonio	22

Constructors' Championship standings

Pos.	Constructor	Points
1	(Germany) Kalex	50
2	(Italy) Boscoscuro	9

Teams' Championship standings

	Pos.	Team	Points
	1	(Finland) Red Bull KTM Ajo	67
	2	(Belgium) Elf Marc VDS Racing Team	62
	3	(Italy) Sky Racing Team VR46	39
	4	(Italy) Federal Oil Gresini Moto2	22
1	5	(Malaysia) Petronas Sprinta Racing	16

=== Moto3 ===
Riders' Championship standings

	Pos.	Biker	Points
1	1	(Spain) Pedro Acosta	45
1	2	(South Africa) Darryn Binder	36
2	3	(Spain) Jaume Masiá	32
2	4	(Italy) Niccolò Antonelli	26
2	5	(Spain) Izan Guevara	19

Constructors' Championship standings

Pos.	Constructor	Points
1	(Austria) KTM	50
2	(Japan) Honda	36
3	(Spain) Gas Gas	23
3	(Sweden) Husqvarna	11

Teams' Championship standings

	Pos.	Team	Points
	1	(Finland) Red Bull KTM Ajo	77
1	2	(Malaysia) Petronas Sprinta Racing	36
1	3	(Spain) GasGas Gaviota Aspar	32
	4	(Spain) Avintia Esponsorama Moto3	30
2	5	(France) CIP Green Power	21

== Notes ==
Previous race: 2021 Qatar Grand Prix	FIM Grand Prix World Championship; 2021 season	Next race: 2021 Portuguese Grand Prix
Previous race: None	Doha motorcycle Grand Prix	Next race: None
