= 2025 Supersport World Championship =

Motorsport championship

2025 Supersport World Championship
Previous:	2024	Next:	2026
Support series: Superbike World Championship; Supersport 300 World Championship; Women’s Circuit Racing World Championship; Yamaha R3 bLU cRU FIM World Cup

The 2025 Supersport World Championship was part of the 38th season of the Superbike World Championship. Stefano Manzi won the championship title at the Estoril round.

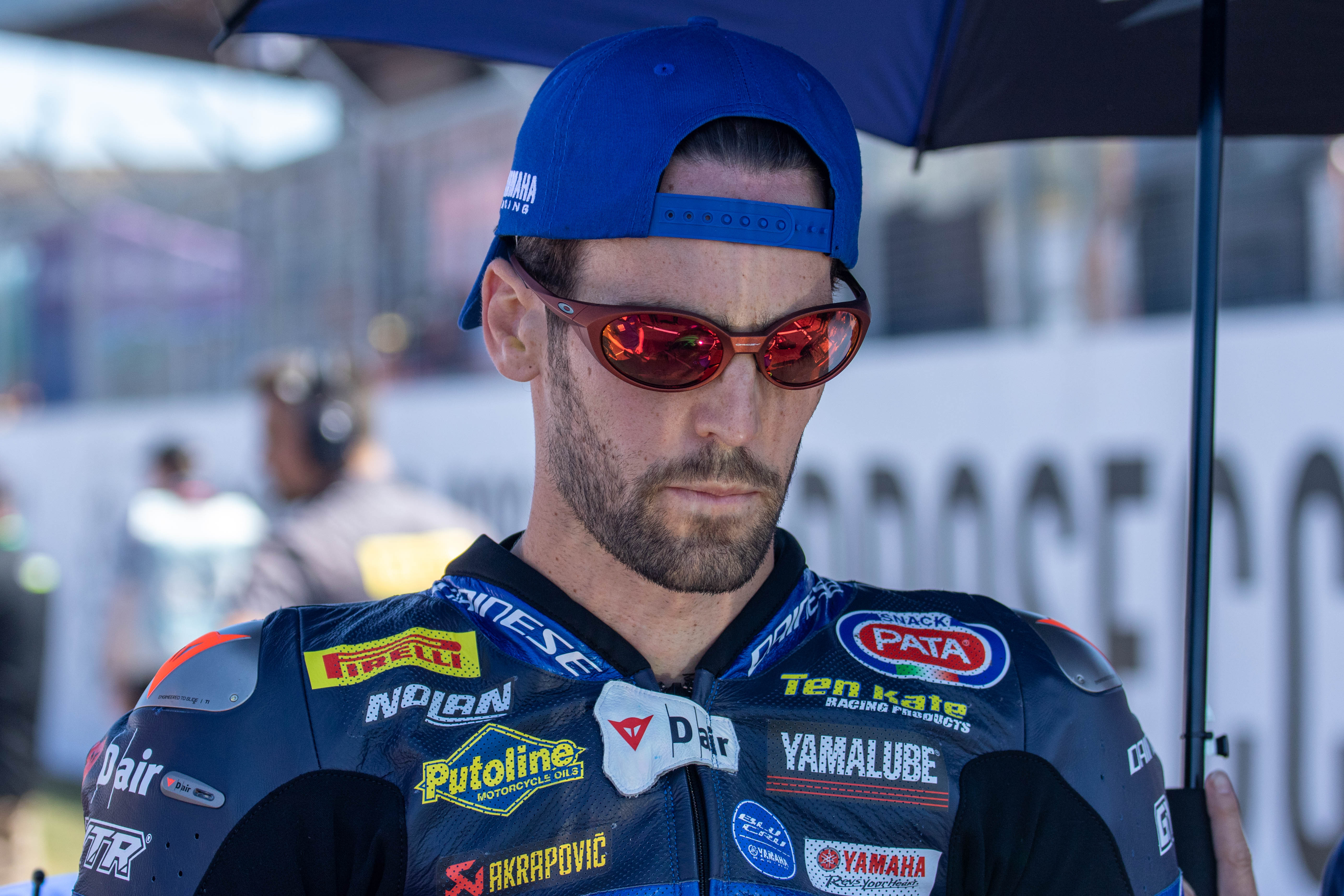
Stefano Manzi was the 2025 Supersport World Champion.

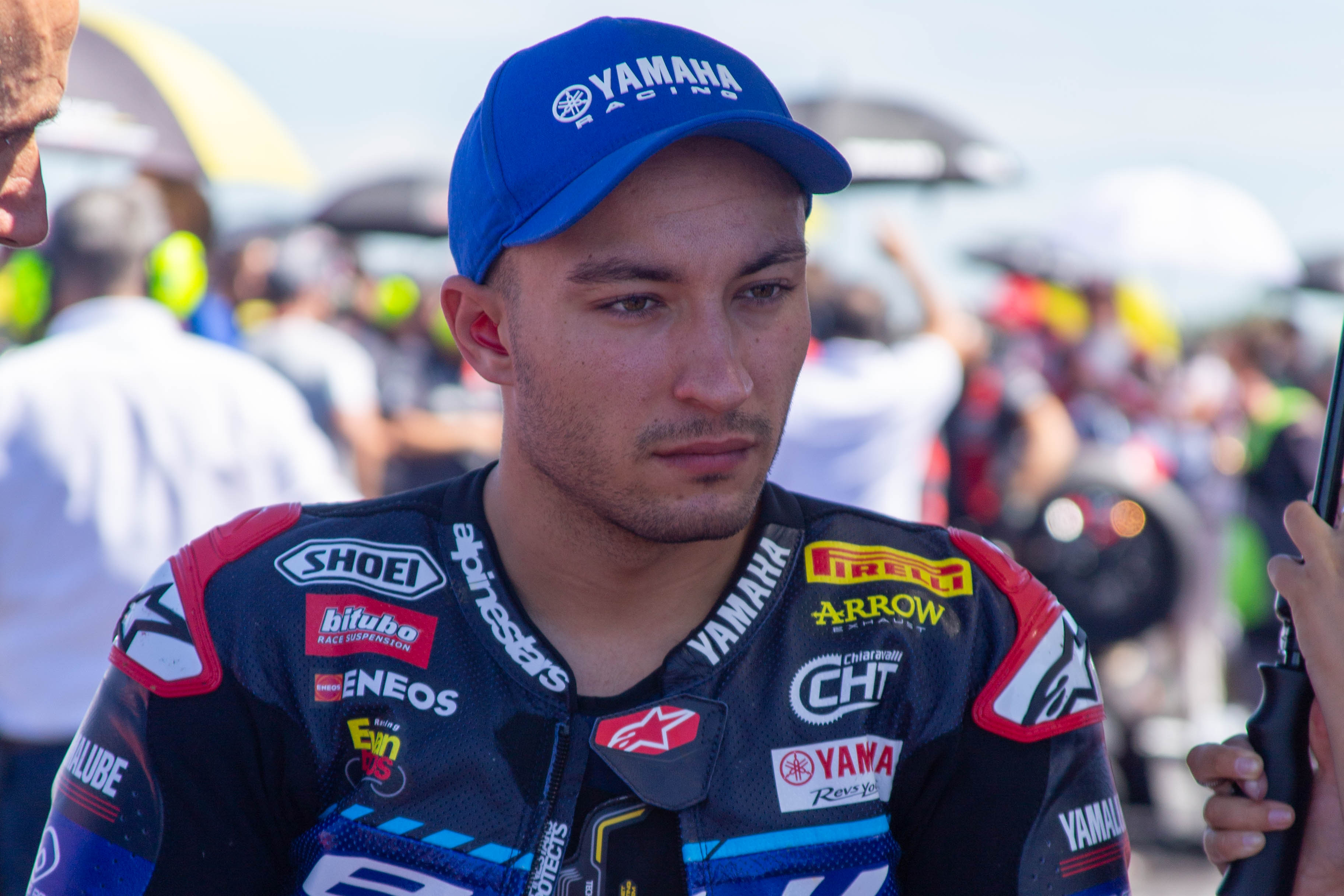
Can Öncü finished second.

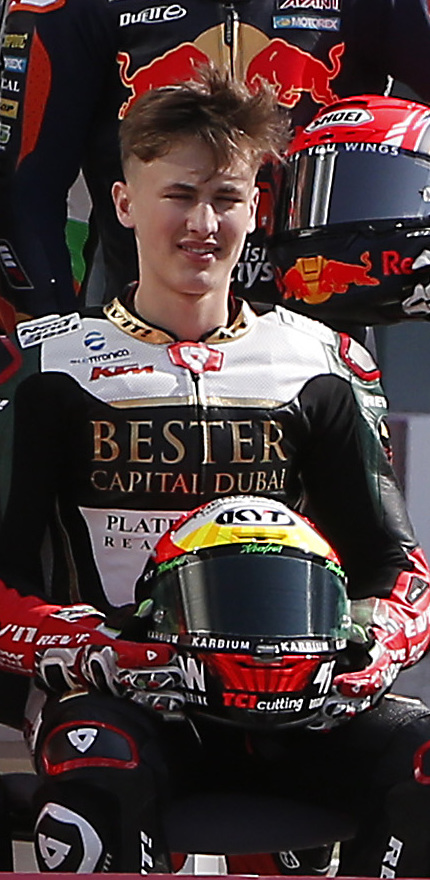
Jaume Masià (pictured in 2019) finished third.

== Race calendar and results ==
The provisional 2025 season calendar was announced on 11 October 2024.

2025 calendar
Round			Circuit	Date	Pole position	Fastest lap	Winning rider	Winning team	Winning constructor	Ref
1	R1	(Australia) Australian Round	Phillip Island Grand Prix Circuit	22 February	(Netherlands) Bo Bendsneyder	(Netherlands) Bo Bendsneyder	(Italy) Stefano Manzi	(Netherlands) Pata Yamaha Ten Kate Racing	(Japan) Yamaha	
1	R2	(Australia) Australian Round	Phillip Island Grand Prix Circuit	23 February		(Netherlands) Bo Bendsneyder	(United Kingdom) Tom Booth-Amos	(United Kingdom) PTR Triumph Factory Racing	(United Kingdom) Triumph	
2	R1	(Portugal) Portuguese Round	Algarve International Circuit	29 March	(Turkey) Can Öncü	(Turkey) Can Öncü	(Turkey) Can Öncü	(Italy) Yamaha bLU cRU Evan Bros Racing	(Japan) Yamaha	
2	R2	(Portugal) Portuguese Round	Algarve International Circuit	30 March		(Turkey) Can Öncü	(Netherlands) Bo Bendsneyder	(Italy) MV Agusta Reparto Corse	(Italy) MV Agusta	
3	R1	(Netherlands) Dutch Round	TT Circuit Assen	12 April	(Turkey) Can Öncü	(Italy) Stefano Manzi	(Netherlands) Bo Bendsneyder	(Italy) MV Agusta Reparto Corse	(Italy) MV Agusta	
3	R2	(Netherlands) Dutch Round	TT Circuit Assen	13 April		(Germany) Marcel Schrötter	(Turkey) Can Öncü	(Italy) Yamaha bLU cRU Evan Bros Racing	(Japan) Yamaha	
4	R1	(Italy) Italian Round	Cremona Circuit	3 May	(Italy) Federico Caricasulo	(United Kingdom) Tom Booth-Amos	(Italy) Stefano Manzi	(Netherlands) Pata Yamaha Ten Kate Racing	(Japan) Yamaha	
4	R2	(Italy) Italian Round	Cremona Circuit	4 May		(France) Lucas Mahias	(Italy) Stefano Manzi	(Netherlands) Pata Yamaha Ten Kate Racing	(Japan) Yamaha	
5	R1	(Czech Republic) Czech Round	Autodrom Most	17 May	(France) Lucas Mahias	(Spain) Jaume Masià	(Spain) Jaume Masià	(Spain) Orelac Racing Verdnatura	(Italy) Ducati	
5	R2	(Czech Republic) Czech Round	Autodrom Most	18 May		(Spain) Jaume Masià	(Turkey) Can Öncü	(Italy) Yamaha bLU cRU Evan Bros Racing	(Japan) Yamaha	
6	R1	Emilia-Romagna Round	Misano World Circuit Marco Simoncelli	14 June	(Spain) Jaume Masià	(Italy) Filippo Farioli	(Italy) Stefano Manzi	(Netherlands) Pata Yamaha Ten Kate Racing	(Japan) Yamaha	
6	R2	Emilia-Romagna Round	Misano World Circuit Marco Simoncelli	15 June		(United Kingdom) Tom Booth-Amos	(Turkey) Can Öncü	(Italy) Yamaha bLU cRU Evan Bros Racing	(Japan) Yamaha	
7	R1	(United Kingdom) UK Round	Donington Park	12 July	(Italy) Stefano Manzi	(Italy) Stefano Manzi	(Italy) Stefano Manzi	(Netherlands) Pata Yamaha Ten Kate Racing	(Japan) Yamaha	
7	R2	(United Kingdom) UK Round	Donington Park	13 July		(Spain) Jaume Masià	(Turkey) Can Öncü	(Italy) Yamaha bLU cRU Evan Bros Racing	(Japan) Yamaha	
8	R1	(Hungary) Hungarian Round	Balaton Park Circuit	26 July	(Netherlands) Bo Bendsneyder	(Italy) Stefano Manzi	(Italy) Stefano Manzi	(Netherlands) Pata Yamaha Ten Kate Racing	(Japan) Yamaha	
8	R2	(Hungary) Hungarian Round	Balaton Park Circuit	27 July		(Italy) Stefano Manzi	(Italy) Stefano Manzi	(Netherlands) Pata Yamaha Ten Kate Racing	(Japan) Yamaha	
9	R1	(France) French Round	Circuit de Nevers Magny-Cours	6 September	(Turkey) Can Öncü	(Turkey) Can Öncü	(Italy) Stefano Manzi	(Netherlands) Pata Yamaha Ten Kate Racing	(Japan) Yamaha	
9	R2	(France) French Round	Circuit de Nevers Magny-Cours	7 September		(Turkey) Can Öncü	(Italy) Stefano Manzi	(Netherlands) Pata Yamaha Ten Kate Racing	(Japan) Yamaha	
10	R1	(Aragon) Aragón Round	MotorLand Aragón	27 September	(Italy) Mattia Casadei	(Germany) Philipp Öttl	(France) Valentin Debise	(Italy) Renzi Corse	(Italy) Ducati	
10	R2	(Aragon) Aragón Round	MotorLand Aragón	28 September		(France) Valentin Debise	(Turkey) Can Öncü	(Italy) Yamaha bLU cRU Evan Bros Racing	(Japan) Yamaha	
11	R1	(Portugal) Estoril Round	Circuito do Estoril	11 October	(Turkey) Can Öncü	(Spain) Roberto García	(France) Valentin Debise	(Italy) Renzi Corse	(Italy) Ducati	
11	R2	(Portugal) Estoril Round	Circuito do Estoril	12 October		(Spain) Jeremy Alcoba	(Italy) Stefano Manzi	(Netherlands) Pata Yamaha Ten Kate Racing	(Japan) Yamaha	
12	R1	(Spain) Spanish Round	Circuito de Jerez	18 October	(Italy) Mattia Casadei	(Turkey) Can Öncü	(Italy) Stefano Manzi	(Netherlands) Pata Yamaha Ten Kate Racing	(Japan) Yamaha	
12	R2	(Spain) Spanish Round	Circuito de Jerez	19 October		(Turkey) Can Öncü	(Spain) Jaume Masià	(Spain) Orelac Racing Verdnatura	(Italy) Ducati	

== Entry list ==
2025 entry list
Team	Constructor	Motorcycle	No	Rider	Class	Rounds
(Italy) D34G WorldSSP Racing Team	Ducati	Panigale V2	28	(Netherlands) Glenn van Straalen		2–5
(Italy) D34G WorldSSP Racing Team	Ducati	Panigale V2	29	(Australia) Harrison Voight		1
(Italy) D34G WorldSSP Racing Team	Ducati	Panigale V2	33	(Spain) Eduardo Montero	C	2–8
(Italy) D34G WorldSSP Racing Team	Ducati	Panigale V2	64	(Italy) Federico Caricasulo		6–12
(Italy) D34G WorldSSP Racing Team	Ducati	Panigale V2	87	(Italy) Andrea Giombini	C	10–12
(Netherlands) EAB Racing Team	Ducati	Panigale V2	7	(Netherlands) Loris Veneman		1–3
(Netherlands) EAB Racing Team	Ducati	Panigale V2	16	(Italy) Bryan D'Onofrio		4–5, 9–12
(Netherlands) EAB Racing Team	Ducati	Panigale V2	26	(Poland) Daniel Blin		8
(Netherlands) EAB Racing Team	Ducati	Panigale V2	29	(Australia) Harrison Voight		6–7
(Italy) Ecosantagata Althea Racing Team	Ducati	Panigale V2	24	(Italy) Leonardo Taccini		1–9, 11–12
(Italy) Ecosantagata Althea Racing Team	Ducati	Panigale V2	43	(Denmark) Simon Jespersen		All
(Italy) Feel Racing WorldSSP Team	Ducati	Panigale V2	65	(Germany) Philipp Öttl		2–12
(Spain) I+Dent Racing Team	Ducati	Panigale V2	41	(Turkey) Kadir Erbay		10
(Italy) Kuja Racing	Ducati	Panigale V2	42	(Italy) Federico Fuligni		4
(Republic of Ireland) MMB Racing	Ducati	Panigale V2	15	(Republic of Ireland) Eugene McManus		2, 7
(Republic of Ireland) MMB Racing	Ducati	Panigale V2	44	(United Kingdom) Harry Truelove		2, 7
(Spain) Orelac Racing Verdnatura	Ducati	Panigale V2	20	(Andorra) Xavier Cardelús		All
(Spain) Orelac Racing Verdnatura	Ducati	Panigale V2	51	(Spain) Jaume Masià		All
(Italy) Renzi Corse	Ducati	Panigale V2	53	(France) Valentin Debise		All
(Czech Republic) SP Race Project	Ducati	Panigale V2	56	(Czech Republic) Jonáš Kocourek		5
(Netherlands) Track and Trades Wixx Racing	Ducati	Panigale V2	25	(Netherlands) Melvin van der Voort		3
(Netherlands) Track and Trades Wixx Racing	Ducati	Panigale V2	45	(Belgium) Luca De Vleeschauwer		3
(Czech Republic) WRP Racing	Ducati	Panigale V2	23	(Germany) Marcel Schrötter		1–11
(Czech Republic) WRP Racing	Ducati	Panigale V2	50	(Czech Republic) Ondřej Vostatek		All
(Czech Republic) WRP Racing	Ducati	Panigale V2	99	(Italy) Matteo Ferrari		11
(Czech Republic) WRP Racing	Ducati	Panigale V2	99	(Italy) Matteo Ferrari		12
(France) Honda RACING World Supersport	Honda	CBR600RR	6	(France) Corentin Perolari	C	2–12
(France) Honda RACING World Supersport	Honda	CBR600RR	22	(Spain) Ana Carrasco	C	2–12
(Germany) MCA Racing	Honda	CBR600RR	48	(Germany) Marvin Siebdrath		12
(Japan) PETRONAS MIE Honda Racing	Honda	CBR600RR	12	(Italy) Luca Ottaviani		7, 11
(Japan) PETRONAS MIE Honda Racing	Honda	CBR600RR	27	(Japan) Kaito Toba		All
(Japan) PETRONAS MIE Honda Racing	Honda	CBR600RR	63	(Malaysia) Syarifuddin Azman		1–6, 8–10, 12
(Japan) PETRONAS MIE Honda Racing	Honda	CBR600RR	67	(Malaysia) Ibrahim Norrodin		9–10
(Italy) BlackFlag Motorsport	Kawasaki	ZX-6R	14	(Spain) Xavier Artigas		6
(Spain) Kawasaki JDO Team	Kawasaki	ZX-6R	19	(Spain) Javier Del Olmo		12
(Italy) Kawasaki WorldSSP Team	Kawasaki	ZX-6R	52	(Spain) Jeremy Alcoba		All
(Italy) Motozoo ME air racing	MV Agusta	F3 800 RR	14	(Spain) Xavier Artigas		11–12
(Italy) Motozoo ME air racing	MV Agusta	F3 800 RR	40	(Italy) Mattia Casadei		6–8, 10–12
(Italy) Motozoo ME air racing	MV Agusta	F3 800 RR	55	(Italy) Mattia Volpi		9
(Italy) Motozoo ME air racing	MV Agusta	F3 800 RR	64	(Italy) Federico Caricasulo		2–5
(Italy) Motozoo ME air racing	MV Agusta	F3 800 RR	68	(Australia) Luke Power		1–10
(Italy) MV Agusta Reparto Corse	MV Agusta	F3 800 RR	11	(Netherlands) Bo Bendsneyder		1–10
(Italy) MV Agusta Reparto Corse	MV Agusta	F3 800 RR	70	(United Kingdom) Joshua Whatley		11–12
(Italy) MV Agusta Reparto Corse	MV Agusta	F3 800 RR	77	(Italy) Filippo Farioli		All
(France) Team Flembbo - Pilote Moto Production	MV Agusta	F3 800 RR	4	(France) Loic Arbel		1–3, 9–12
(France) Team Flembbo - Pilote Moto Production	MV Agusta	F3 800 RR	9	(France) Andy Verdoïa		4–5
(France) Team Flembbo - Pilote Moto Production	MV Agusta	F3 800 RR	74	(Poland) Piotr Biesiekirski		6–8
(China) QJMotor Factory Racing	QJ Motor	SRK 800	3	(Italy) Raffaele De Rosa	C	2–12
(China) QJMotor Factory Racing	QJ Motor	SRK 800	66	(Finland) Niki Tuuli	C	2–12
(Czech Republic) Genius Racing by Motolife	Triumph	Street Triple RS 765	92	(Czech Republic) Filip Feigl		5
(United Kingdom) PTR Triumph Factory Racing	Triumph	Street Triple RS 765	32	(Australia) Oli Bayliss		All
(United Kingdom) PTR Triumph Factory Racing	Triumph	Street Triple RS 765	69	(United Kingdom) Tom Booth-Amos		All
(Italy) Bike e Motor Racing Team	Yamaha	YZF-R6	88	(Italy) Matteo Patacca		6
(Italy) Team Rosso e Nero	Yamaha	YZF-R6	13	(Italy) Mattia Rato		4
(France) GMT94 - Yamaha	Yamaha	YZF-R9	21	(Italy) Michael Ruben Rinaldi		1–5
(France) GMT94 - Yamaha	Yamaha	YZF-R9	37	(Spain) Roberto García		6–12
(France) GMT94 - Yamaha	Yamaha	YZF-R9	39	(France) Bartholomé Perrin		9
(France) GMT94 - Yamaha	Yamaha	YZF-R9	94	(France) Lucas Mahias		All
(Netherlands) Pata Yamaha Ten Kate Racing	Yamaha	YZF-R9	31	(Japan) Yuki Okamoto		1–7, 9–12
(Netherlands) Pata Yamaha Ten Kate Racing	Yamaha	YZF-R9	62	(Italy) Stefano Manzi		All
(Italy) VFT Racing	Yamaha	YZF-R9	5	(Italy) Niccolò Antonelli		All
(Italy) Yamaha bLU cRU Evan Bros Racing	Yamaha	YZF-R9	57	(Indonesia) Aldi Satya Mahendra		1–8
(Italy) Yamaha bLU cRU Evan Bros Racing	Yamaha	YZF-R9	61	(Turkey) Can Öncü		All
(Italy) Yamaha bLU cRU Evan Bros Racing	Yamaha	YZF-R9	76	(Italy) Alberto Surra		9–12

Key
Regular rider
Wildcard rider
Replacement rider
C WorldSSP Challenge

== Championship standings ==
=== Points ===
Position	**1st**	**2nd**	**3rd**	**4th**	**5th**	**6th**	**7th**	**8th**	**9th**	**10th**	**11th**	**12th**	**13th**	**14th**	**15th**
Points	25	20	16	13	11	10	9	8	7	6	5	4	3	2	1

=== Riders' championship ===
Pos.	Rider	Bike	PHI (Australia)		POR (Portugal)		ASS (Netherlands)		CRE (Italy)		MOS (Czech Republic)		MIS (Emilia-Romagna)		DON (United Kingdom)		BAL (Hungary)		MAG (France)		ARA (Spain)		EST (Portugal)		JER (Spain)		Pts.
Pos.	Rider	Bike	R1	R2	R1	R2	R1	R2	R1	R2	R1	R2	R1	R2	R1	R2	R1	R2	R1	R2	R1	R2	R1	R2	R1	R2	Pts.
1	(Italy) Stefano Manzi	Yamaha	1	2	2	2	2	**2**	1	1	26	6	1	Ret	**1**	**7**	1	**1**	1	1	3	2	2	1	1	3	466
2	(Turkey) Can Öncü	Yamaha	5	16	**1**	**Ret**	**3**	1	NC	Ret	2	1	3	1	5	1	2	3	**2**	**2**	2	1	**3**	9	3	**4**	372
3	(Spain) Jaume Masià	Ducati	6	Ret	7	7	4	5	4	3	1	**Ret**	**2**	2	4	4	7	6	Ret	9	6	5	8	Ret	4	1	265
4	(United Kingdom) Tom Booth-Amos	Triumph	2	1	5	3	5	15	2	**2**	Ret	9	5	Ret	2	2	Ret	10	6	3	16	7	23	6	7	2	262
5	(France) Valentin Debise	Ducati	8	Ret	8	5	Ret	4	3	Ret	NC	5	4	3	9	11	Ret	5	NC	Ret	1	3	1	Ret	9	8	200
6	(Germany) Philipp Öttl	Ducati			11	10	7	13	15	Ret	7	3	10	4	6	6	9	Ret	9	8	4	**4**	4	2	8	6	187
7	(France) Lucas Mahias	Yamaha	9	6	4	4	9	Ret	5	4	**3**	2	8	Ret	3	3	26	17	4	13	8	20	5	Ret	Ret	DNS	185
8	(Spain) Jeremy Alcoba	Kawasaki	10	5	9	6	10	7	13	8	10	14	7	5	7	8	14	Ret	8	4	10	Ret	7	3	2	12	183
9	(Netherlands) Bo Bendsneyder	MV Agusta	**4**	**3**	3	1	1	3	7	5	8	10	13	8	28	17	**3**	16	10	17	31	19					178
10	(Germany) Marcel Schrötter	Ducati	3	Ret	6	8	25	6	10	11	4	4	6	Ret	12	Ret	13	11	NC	11	14	14	Ret	16			112
11	(Italy) Filippo Farioli	MV Agusta	WD	WD	15	12	11	21	8	6	NC	13	NC	**Ret**	NC	13	4	Ret	7	7	5	8	11	Ret	14	9	98
12	(Andorra) Xavier Cardelús	Ducati	Ret	8	14	13	Ret	14	6	7	14	17	17	12	13	15	10	8	11	15	7	6	10	14	16	Ret	91
13	(France) Corentin Perolari	Honda			13	11	12	10	Ret	Ret	6	8	14	Ret	29	9	24	15	5	5	20	11	14	8	Ret	11	88
14	(Australia) Oli Bayliss	Triumph	7	7	17	Ret	Ret	Ret	12	13	9	12	19	11	Ret	12	8	4	12	10	23	13	13	12	Ret	17	86
15	(Spain) Roberto García	Yamaha											16	6	20	5	5	7	Ret	14	12	23	17	**4**	10	7	75
16	(Denmark) Simon Jespersen	Ducati	15	12	18	14	15	11	Ret	Ret	11	16	15	14	11	16	6	2	25	6	15	16	Ret	11	22	15	73
17	(Indonesia) Aldi Satya Mahendra	Yamaha	Ret	13	20	15	8	8	9	10	5	7	31	13	10	14	11	12									73
18	(Italy) Federico Caricasulo	MV Agusta			10	28	13	9	**14**	9	25	11															64
18	(Italy) Federico Caricasulo	Ducati											9	9	Ret	18	12	DNS	Ret	Ret	13	10	28	13	12	Ret	64
19	(Italy) Alberto Surra	Yamaha																	3	Ret	9	9	6	5	5	DNS	62
20	(Italy) Mattia Casadei	MV Agusta											11	7	8	10	Ret	9			**11**	Ret	27	17	**6**	5	61
21	(Italy) Leonardo Taccini	Ducati	Ret	15	12	9	6	Ret	17	12	13	23	12	10	14	Ret	16	Ret	Ret	16			12	15	20	DNS	46
22	(Czech Republic) Ondřej Vostatek	Ducati	13	10	Ret	19	18	18	19	16	12	15	23	17	17	21	15	13	14	Ret	18	17	15	7	17	18	30
23	(Italy) Raffaele De Rosa	QJ Motor			21	Ret	DNS	DNS	23	22	15	21	Ret	Ret	27	25	Ret	20	13	20	19	15	9	10	11	10	29
24	(Italy) Michael Ruben Rinaldi	Yamaha	Ret	4	19	17	16	12	Ret	20	18	20															17
25	(Japan) Kaito Toba	Honda	14	9	27	Ret	Ret	Ret	Ret	15	19	24	30	Ret	16	20	Ret	14	Ret	22	22	Ret	19	21	15	14	15
26	(Italy) Niccolò Antonelli	Yamaha	11	DNS	16	16	22	19	11	Ret	16	30	18	15	15	19	25	Ret	15	Ret	21	18	18	20	28	Ret	13
27	(Finland) Niki Tuuli	QJ Motor			23	20	20	22	DNS	DNS	Ret	DNS	22	18	18	Ret	18	18	Ret	12	29	12	20	18	18	13	11
28	(Australia) Luke Power	MV Agusta	12	11	DNS	DNS	21	17	20	Ret	22	18	Ret	Ret	19	Ret	19	24	16	21	DNS	DNS					9
29	(Italy) Matteo Ferrari	Ducati																					Ret	19	13	16	3
30	(Japan) Yuki Okamoto	Yamaha			24	21	17	16	16	14	17	31	24	20	DNS	DNS			17	18	25	26	24	25	25	Ret	2
31	(Netherlands) Glenn van Straalen	Ducati			22	18	14	Ret	24	18	Ret	22															2
32	(Australia) Harrison Voight	Ducati	Ret	14									25	Ret	DNS	DNS											2
33	(Spain) Xavier Artigas	Kawasaki											20	16													0
33	(Spain) Xavier Artigas	MV Agusta																					16	Ret	DNS	DNS	0
34	(France) Loïc Arbel	MV Agusta	16	17	Ret	24	Ret	DNS											19	NC	Ret	25	26	27	24	20	0
35	(Italy) Mattia Rato	Yamaha							18	17																	0
36	(Malaysia) Syarifuddin Azman	Honda	17	19	Ret	25	DNS	DNS	26	Ret	24	27	29	23			21	21	21	25	26	22			27	23	0
37	(Poland) Piotr Biesiekirski	MV Agusta											26	21	23	24	17	Ret									0
38	(Turkey) Kadir Erbay	Ducati																			17	Ret					0
39	(Italy) Mattia Volpi	MV Agusta																	18	19							0
40	(Netherlands) Loris Veneman	Ducati	Ret	18	26	Ret	23	Ret																			0
41	(Poland) Daniel Blin	Ducati															20	19									0
42	(Italy) Bryan D'Onofrio	Ducati							22	21	23	25							20	23	24	21	25	26	21	19	0
43	(Italy) Matteo Patacca	Yamaha											21	19													0
44	(Italy) Federico Fuligni	Ducati							21	19																	0
45	(United Kingdom) Joshua Whatley	MV Agusta																					21	22	19	Ret	0
46	(France) Andy Verdoïa	MV Agusta							Ret	24	Ret	19															0
47	(Netherlands) Melvin van der Voort	Ducati					19	Ret																			0
48	(Czech Republic) Jonáš Kocourek	Ducati									20	27															0
49	(Belgium) Luca De Vleeschauwer	Ducati					Ret	20																			0
50	(Italy) Andrea Giombini	Ducati																			27	24	22	24	23	21	0
51	(Italy) Luca Ottaviani	Honda													21	22							Ret	23			0
52	(Czech Republic) Filip Feigl	Triumph									21	26															0
53	(Spain) Eduardo Montero	Ducati			28	23	Ret	DNS	25	23	Ret	29	27	22	24	26	22	22									0
54	(Spain) Ana Carrasco	Honda			30	26	24	23	27	Ret	DNQ	DNQ	28	24	26	28	23	23	22	24	28	27	Ret	28	26	22	0
55	(Republic of Ireland) Eugene McManus	Ducati			25	22									22	23											0
56	(France) Bartholomé Perrin	Yamaha																	23	Ret							0
57	(Malaysia) Ibrahim Norrodin	Honda																	24	Ret	30	28					0
58	(Germany) Marvin Siebdrath	Honda																							Ret	24	0
59	(United Kingdom) Harry Truelove	Ducati			29	27									25	27											0
60	(Spain) Javier Del Olmo	Kawasaki																							Ret	25	0

Colour	Result
Gold	Winner
Silver	Second place
Bronze	Third place
Green	Points classification
Blue	Non-points classification
Blue	Non-classified finish (NC)
Purple	Retired, not classified (Ret)
Red	Did not qualify (DNQ)
Red	Did not pre-qualify (DNPQ)
Black	Disqualified (DSQ)
White	Did not start (DNS)
White	Withdrew (WD)
White	Race cancelled (C)
Blank	Did not practice (DNP)
Blank	Did not arrive (DNA)
Blank	Excluded (EX)

**Bold** – Pole position
Italics – Fastest lap

=== Teams' championship ===
Pos.	Teams	Bike No.	PHI (Australia)		POR (Portugal)		ASS (Netherlands)		CRE (Italy)		MOS (Czech Republic)		MIS (Emilia-Romagna)		DON (United Kingdom)		BAL (Hungary)		MAG (France)		ARA (Spain)		EST (Portugal)		JER (Spain)		Pts.
Pos.	Teams	Bike No.	R1	R2	R1	R2	R1	R2	R1	R2	R1	R2	R1	R2	R1	R2	R1	R2	R1	R2	R1	R2	R1	R2	R1	R2	Pts.
1	(Italy) Yamaha bLU cRU Evan Bros Racing	57	Ret	13	20	15	8	8	9	10	5	7	31	13	10	14	11	12									507
1	(Italy) Yamaha bLU cRU Evan Bros Racing	61	5	16	**1**	**Ret**	**3**	1	NC	Ret	2	1	3	1	5	1	2	3	**2**	**2**	2	1	**3**	9	3	**4**	507
1	(Italy) Yamaha bLU cRU Evan Bros Racing	76																	3	Ret	9	9	6	5	5	DNS	507
2	(Netherlands) Pata Yamaha Ten Kate Racing	31			24	21	17	16	16	14	17	31	24	20	DNS	DNS			17	18	25	26	24	25	25	Ret	468
2	(Netherlands) Pata Yamaha Ten Kate Racing	62	1	2	2	2	2	**2**	1	1	26	6	1	Ret	1	**7**	1	**1**	1	1	3	2	2	1	1	3	468
3	(Spain) Orelac Racing Vernatura	20	Ret	8	14	13	Ret	14	6	7	14	17	17	12	13	15	10	8	11	15	7	6	10	14	16	Ret	356
3	(Spain) Orelac Racing Vernatura	51	6	Ret	7	7	4	5	4	3	1	**Ret**	**2**	2	4	4	7	6	Ret	9	6	5	8	Ret	4	1	356
4	(United Kingdom) PTR Triumph Factory Racing	32	7	7	17	Ret	Ret	Ret	12	13	9	12	19	11	Ret	12	8	4	12	10	23	13	13	12	Ret	17	348
4	(United Kingdom) PTR Triumph Factory Racing	69	2	1	5	3	5	15	2	**2**	Ret	9	5	Ret	2	2	Ret	10	6	3	16	7	23	6	7	2	348
5	(France) GMT94 - Yamaha	21	Ret	4	19	17	16	12	Ret	20	18	20															277
5	(France) GMT94 - Yamaha	37											16	6	20	5	5	7	Ret	14	12	23	17	**4**	10	7	277
5	(France) GMT94 - Yamaha	39																	23	Ret							277
5	(France) GMT94 - Yamaha	94	9	6	4	4	9	Ret	5	4	**3**	2	8	Ret	3	3	26	17	4	13	8	20	5	Ret	Ret	DNS	277
6	(Italy) MV Agusta Reparto Corse	11	**4**	**3**	3	1	1	1	7	5	8	10	13	8	28	17	**3**	16	10	17	31	19					276
6	(Italy) MV Agusta Reparto Corse	70																					21	22	19	Ret	276
6	(Italy) MV Agusta Reparto Corse	77	WD	WD	15	12	11	21	8	6	NC	13	NC	**Ret**	NC	13	4	Ret	7	7	5	8	11	Ret	14	9	276
7	(Italy) Renzi Corse	53	8	Ret	8	5	Ret	4	3	Ret	NC	5	4	3	9	11	Ret	5	NC	Ret	1	3	1	Ret	9	8	200
8	(Italy) Feel Racing WorldSSP Team	65			11	10	7	13	15	Ret	7	3	10	4	6	6	9	Ret	9	8	4	**4**	4	2	8	6	187
9	(Italy) Kawasaki WorldSSP Team	52	10	5	9	6	10	7	13	8	10	14	7	5	7	8	14	Ret	8	4	10	Ret	7	3	2	12	183
10	(Czech Republic) WRP Racing	23	3	Ret	6	8	25	6	10	11	4	4	6	Ret	12	Ret	13	11	NC	11	14	14	Ret	16			145
10	(Czech Republic) WRP Racing	50	13	10	Ret	19	18	18	19	16	12	15	23	17	17	21	15	13	14	Ret	18	17	15	7	17	18	145
10	(Czech Republic) WRP Racing	99																					Ret	19	13	16	145
11	(Italy) Ecosantagata Althea Racing Team	24	Ret	15	12	9	6	Ret	17	12	13	23	12	10	14	Ret	16	Ret	Ret	16			12	15	20	DNS	119
11	(Italy) Ecosantagata Althea Racing Team	43	15	12	18	14	15	11	Ret	Ret	11	16	15	14	11	16	6	2	25	6	15	16	Ret	11	22	15	119
12	(Italy) Motozoo ME air Racing	14																					16	Ret	DNS	DNS	100
12	(Italy) Motozoo ME air Racing	40											11	7	8	10	Ret	9			**11**	Ret	27	17	**6**	5	100
12	(Italy) Motozoo ME air Racing	55																	18	19							100
12	(Italy) Motozoo ME air Racing	64			10	28	13	9	**14**	9	25	11															100
12	(Italy) Motozoo ME air Racing	68	12	11	DNS	DNS	21	17	20	Ret	22	18	Ret	Ret	19	Ret	19	24	16	21	DNS	DNS					100
13	(France) HONDA RACING World Supersport	6			13	11	12	10	Ret	Ret	6	8	14	Ret	29	9	24	15	5	5	20	11	14	8	Ret	11	88
13	(France) HONDA RACING World Supersport	22			30	26	24	23	27	Ret	DNQ	DNQ	28	24	26	28	23	23	22	24	28	27	Ret	28	26	22	88
14	(China) QJMotor Factory Racing	3			21	Ret	DNS	DNS	23	22	15	21	Ret	Ret	27	25	Ret	20	13	20	19	15	9	10	11	10	40
14	(China) QJMotor Factory Racing	66			23	20	20	22	DNS	DNS	Ret	DNS	22	18	18	Ret	18	18	Ret	12	29	12	20	18	18	13	40
15	(Italy) D34G WorldSSP Racing Team	28			22	18	14	Ret	24	18	Ret	22															38
15	(Italy) D34G WorldSSP Racing Team	29	Ret	14																							38
15	(Italy) D34G WorldSSP Racing Team	33			28	23	Ret	DNS	25	23	Ret	29	27	22	24	26	22	22									38
15	(Italy) D34G WorldSSP Racing Team	64											9	9	Ret	18	12	DNS	Ret	Ret	13	10	28	13	12	Ret	38
15	(Italy) D34G WorldSSP Racing Team	87																			27	24	22	24	23	21	38
16	(Japan) PETRONAS MIE Honda Racing	12													21	22							Ret	23			15
16	(Japan) PETRONAS MIE Honda Racing	27	14	9	27	Ret	Ret	Ret	Ret	17	19	24	30	NC	16	20	Ret	14	Ret	22	22	Ret	19	21	15	14	15
16	(Japan) PETRONAS MIE Honda Racing	63	17	19	Ret	25	DNS	DNS	26	Ret	24	28	29	23			21	21	21	25	26	22			27	23	15
16	(Japan) PETRONAS MIE Honda Racing	67																	24	Ret	30	28					15
17	(Italy) VFT Racing	5	11	DNS	16	16	22	19	11	Ret	16	30	18	15	15	19	25	Ret	15	Ret	21	18	18	20	28	Ret	13
	(France) Team Flembbo - Pilote Moto Production	4	16	17	Ret	24	Ret	DNS											19	NC	Ret	25	26	27	24	20	0
	(France) Team Flembbo - Pilote Moto Production	9							Ret	24	Ret	19															0
	(France) Team Flembbo - Pilote Moto Production	74											26	21	23	24	17	Ret									0
	(Italy) Black Flag Motorsport	14											20	16													0
	(Italy) Team Rosso e Nero	13							18	17																	0
	(Spain) I+Dent Racing Team	41																			17	Ret					0
	(Netherlands) EAB Racing Team	7	Ret	18	26	Ret	23	Ret																			0
	(Netherlands) EAB Racing Team	16							22	21	23	25							20	23	24	21	25	26	21	19	0
	(Netherlands) EAB Racing Team	26															20	19									0
	(Netherlands) EAB Racing Team	29											25	Ret	DNS	DNS											0
	(Netherlands) Track and Trades Wixx Racing	25					19	Ret																			0
	(Netherlands) Track and Trades Wixx Racing	45					Ret	20																			0
	(Italy) Bike e Motor Racing Team	88											21	19													0
	(Italy) Kuja Racing	42							21	19																	0
	(Czech Republic) SP Race Project	56									20	27															0
	(Czech Republic) Genius Racing by Motolife	92									21	26															0
	(Republic of Ireland) MMB Racing	15			25	22									22	23											0
	(Republic of Ireland) MMB Racing	44			29	27									25	27											0
	(Germany) MCA Racing	48																							Ret	24	0
	(Spain) Kawasaki JDO Team	19																							Ret	25	0

=== Manufacturers' championship ===
Pos.	Manufacturer	PHI (Australia)		POR (Portugal)		ASS (Netherlands)		CRE (Italy)		MOS (Czech Republic)		MIS (Emilia-Romagna)		DON (United Kingdom)		BAL (Hungary)		MAG (France)		ARA (Spain)		EST (Portugal)		JER (Spain)		Pts.
Pos.	Manufacturer	R1	R2	R1	R2	R1	R2	R1	R2	R1	R2	R1	R2	R1	R2	R1	R2	R1	R2	R1	R2	R1	R2	R1	R2	Pts.
1	(Japan) Yamaha	1	2	1	2	2	1	1	1	2	1	1	1	1	1	1	1	1	1	2	1	2	1	1	3	561
2	(Italy) Ducati	3	8	6	5	4	4	3	3	1	3	2	2	4	4	6	2	9	6	1	3	1	2	4	1	381
3	(United Kingdom) Triumph	2	1	5	3	5	15	2	2	9	9	5	11	2	2	8	4	6	3	16	7	13	6	7	2	292
4	(Italy) MV Agusta	4	3	3	1	1	3	7	5	8	10	11	7	8	10	3	9	7	7	5	8	11	17	6	5	259
5	(Japan) Kawasaki	10	5	9	6	10	7	13	8	10	14	7	5	7	8	14	Ret	8	4	10	Ret	7	3	2	12	183
6	(Japan) Honda	14	9	13	11	12	10	26	15	6	8	14	23	16	9	21	14	5	5	20	11	14	8	15	11	100
7	(China) QJ Motor			21	20	20	22	23	22	15	21	22	18	18	25	18	18	13	12	19	12	9	10	11	10	36
