= 2019 Valencian Community motorcycle Grand Prix =

2019 Valencian Community Grand Prix
Race details
- Race 19 of 19 races in the 2019 Grand Prix motorcycle racing season
- Date: 17 November 2019
- Official name: Gran Premio Motul de la Comunitat Valenciana
- Location: Circuit Ricardo Tormo
- Course: Permanent racing facility; 4.005 km (2.489 mi)

MotoGP
Pole position
Rider	(France) Fabio Quartararo	Yamaha
Time	1:29.978	
Fastest lap
Rider	(Spain) Marc Márquez	Honda
Time	1:31.116 on lap 4	
Podium
First	(Spain) Marc Márquez	Honda
Second	(France) Fabio Quartararo	Yamaha
Third	(Australia) Jack Miller	Ducati

Moto2
Pole position
Rider	(Spain) Jorge Navarro	Speed Up
Time	1:34.461	
Fastest lap
Rider	(Switzerland) Thomas Lüthi	Kalex
Time	1:34.820 on lap 12	
Podium
First	(South Africa) Brad Binder	KTM
Second	(Switzerland) Thomas Lüthi	Kalex
Third	(Spain) Jorge Navarro	Speed Up

Moto3
Pole position
Rider	(Italy) Andrea Migno	KTM
Time	1:38.683	
Fastest lap
Rider	(Japan) Tatsuki Suzuki	Honda
Time	1:39.948 on lap 11	
Podium
First	(Spain) Sergio García	Honda
Second	(Italy) Andrea Migno	KTM
Third	(Spain) Xavier Artigas	Honda

MotoE Race 1
Pole position
Rider	(Brazil) Eric Granado	Energica
Time	1:40.615	
Fastest lap
Rider	(Brazil) Eric Granado	Energica
Time	1:40.234 on lap 4	
Podium
First	(Brazil) Eric Granado	Energica
Second	(United Kingdom) Bradley Smith	Energica
Third	(Italy) Matteo Ferrari	Energica

MotoE Race 2
Pole position
Rider	(Brazil) Eric Granado	Energica
Time	1:40.615	
Fastest lap
Rider	(Brazil) Eric Granado	Energica
Time	1:40.350 on lap 3	
Podium
First	(Brazil) Eric Granado	Energica
Second	(United Kingdom) Bradley Smith	Energica
Third	(Spain) Héctor Garzó	Energica

The 2019 Valencian Community motorcycle Grand Prix was the nineteenth and final round of the 2019 MotoGP season. It was held at the Circuit Ricardo Tormo in Valencia on 17 November 2019.

== Classification ==
=== MotoGP ===
Pos.	No.	Rider	Team	Manufacturer	Laps	Time/Retired	Grid	Points
1	93	(Spain) Marc Márquez	Repsol Honda Team	Honda	27	41:21.469	2	25
2	20	(France) Fabio Quartararo	Petronas Yamaha SRT	Yamaha	27	+1.026	1	20
3	43	(Australia) Jack Miller	Pramac Racing	Ducati	27	+2.409	3	16
4	4	(Italy) Andrea Dovizioso	Ducati Team	Ducati	27	+3.326	6	13
5	42	(Spain) Álex Rins	Team Suzuki Ecstar	Suzuki	27	+3.508	8	11
6	12	(Spain) Maverick Viñales	Monster Energy Yamaha MotoGP	Yamaha	27	+8.829	4	10
7	36	(Spain) Joan Mir	Team Suzuki Ecstar	Suzuki	27	+10.622	7	9
8	46	(Italy) Valentino Rossi	Monster Energy Yamaha MotoGP	Yamaha	27	+22.992	12	8
9	41	(Spain) Aleix Espargaró	Aprilia Racing Team Gresini	Aprilia	27	+32.704	15	7
10	44	(Spain) Pol Espargaró	Red Bull KTM Factory Racing	KTM	27	+32.973	11	6
11	53	(Spain) Tito Rabat	Reale Avintia Racing	Ducati	27	+42.795	18	5
12	82	(Finland) Mika Kallio	Red Bull KTM Factory Racing	KTM	27	+45.732	17	4
13	99	(Spain) Jorge Lorenzo	Repsol Honda Team	Honda	27	+51.044	16	3
14	17	(Czech Republic) Karel Abraham	Reale Avintia Racing	Ducati	27	+1:04.871	21	2
15	55	(Malaysia) Hafizh Syahrin	Red Bull KTM Tech3	KTM	27	+1:16.487	22	1
Ret	21	(Italy) Franco Morbidelli	Petronas Yamaha SRT	Yamaha	18	Accident	5	
Ret	9	(Italy) Danilo Petrucci	Ducati Team	Ducati	13	Accident	10	
Ret	5	(France) Johann Zarco	LCR Honda Idemitsu	Honda	13	Accident	13	
Ret	27	(Spain) Iker Lecuona	Red Bull KTM Tech3	KTM	13	Accident	19	
Ret	35	(United Kingdom) Cal Crutchlow	LCR Honda Castrol	Honda	10	Accident	9	
Ret	51	(Italy) Michele Pirro	Ducati Team	Ducati	8	Illness	14	
DSQ (Ret)	29	(Italy) Andrea Iannone	Aprilia Racing Team Gresini	Aprilia	26	Accident	20	
DNS	63	(Italy) Francesco Bagnaia	Pramac Racing	Ducati		Did not start		
Sources:

- Francesco Bagnaia suffered a broken collarbone in a crash during practice and withdrew from the event.
- Andrea Iannone was retroactively disqualified on 31 March 2020 as part of his suspension for a failed doping test after the Malaysian Grand Prix.

=== Moto2 ===
Pos.	No.	Rider	Manufacturer	Laps	Time/Retired	Grid	Points
1	41	(South Africa) Brad Binder	KTM	16	25:30.766	7	25
2	12	(Switzerland) Thomas Lüthi	Kalex	16	+0.735	5	20
3	9	(Spain) Jorge Navarro	Speed Up	16	+1.045	1	16
4	62	(Italy) Stefano Manzi	MV Agusta	16	+1.185	3	13
5	88	(Spain) Jorge Martín	KTM	16	+8.066	2	11
6	40	(Spain) Augusto Fernández	Kalex	16	+8.311	8	10
7	97	(Spain) Xavi Vierge	Kalex	16	+9.922	11	9
8	10	(Italy) Luca Marini	Kalex	16	+11.085	4	8
9	21	(Italy) Fabio Di Giannantonio	Speed Up	16	+11.739	6	7
10	22	(United Kingdom) Sam Lowes	Kalex	16	+12.362	10	6
11	54	(Italy) Mattia Pasini	Kalex	16	+16.620	12	5
12	77	(Switzerland) Dominique Aegerter	MV Agusta	16	+17.160	19	4
13	96	(United Kingdom) Jake Dixon	KTM	16	+17.595	17	3
14	33	(Italy) Enea Bastianini	Kalex	16	+17.624	9	2
15	87	(Australia) Remy Gardner	Kalex	16	+17.835	14	1
16	23	(Germany) Marcel Schrötter	Kalex	16	+18.090	16	
17	7	(Italy) Lorenzo Baldassarri	Kalex	16	+18.251	23	
18	16	(United States) Joe Roberts	KTM	16	+18.434	32	
19	72	(Italy) Marco Bezzecchi	KTM	16	+19.829	20	
20	5	(Italy) Andrea Locatelli	Kalex	16	+20.278 (Note: 3-second penalty.)	13	
21	45	(Japan) Tetsuta Nagashima	Kalex	16	+20.298	21	
22	11	(Italy) Nicolò Bulega	Kalex	16	+20.362	18	
23 (Note: 2-position penalty.)	35	(Thailand) Somkiat Chantra	Kalex	16	+20.280	24	
24	64	(Netherlands) Bo Bendsneyder	NTS	16	+25.732	22	
25	20	(Indonesia) Dimas Ekky Pratama	Kalex	16	+28.179	25	
26	65	(Germany) Philipp Öttl	KTM	16	+28.392	26	
27	70	(Italy) Tommaso Marcon	NTS	16	+32.617	28	
28	18	(Andorra) Xavi Cardelús	KTM	16	+37.281	30	
29	47	(Malaysia) Adam Norrodin	Kalex	16	+37.410	29	
30	73	(Spain) Álex Márquez	Kalex	16	+1:29.344	15	
Ret	69	(United States) Sean Dylan Kelly	KTM	14	Accident	27	
Ret	3	(Germany) Lukas Tulovic	KTM	5	Gearbox	31	
OFFICIAL MOTO2 REPORT

=== Moto3 ===
The race, scheduled to be run for 21 laps, was red-flagged due to a multiple rider crash. The race was later restarted over 15 laps.

Pos.	No.	Rider	Manufacturer	Laps	Time/Retired	Grid	Points
1	11	(Spain) Sergio García	Honda	15	25:17.918	5	25
2	16	(Italy) Andrea Migno	KTM	15	+0.005	1	20
3	4	(Spain) Xavier Artigas	Honda	15	+0.180	16	16
4	24	(Japan) Tatsuki Suzuki	Honda	15	+0.246	8	13
5	12	(Czech Republic) Filip Salač	KTM	15	+0.328	6	11
6	44	(Spain) Arón Canet	KTM	15	+3.016	4	10
7	42	(Spain) Marcos Ramírez	Honda	15	+3.032	2	9
8	13	(Italy) Celestino Vietti	KTM	15	+9.666	22	8
9	76	(Kazakhstan) Makar Yurchenko	KTM	15	+9.747	26 (Note: Back of the grid start penalty.)	7
10	79	(Japan) Ai Ogura	Honda	15	+9.859	28	6
11	82	(Italy) Stefano Nepa	KTM	15	+9.975	27	5
12	61	(Turkey) Can Öncü	KTM	15	+10.223	24 (Note: 12-place grid penalty.)	4
13	27	(Japan) Kaito Toba	Honda	15	+10.537	25	3
14	54	(Italy) Riccardo Rossi	Honda	15	+10.712	17	2
15	84	(Czech Republic) Jakub Kornfeil	KTM	15	+12.661	29	1
16	22	(Japan) Kazuki Masaki	KTM	15	+14.116	23	
17	55	(Italy) Romano Fenati	Honda	15	+17.669	9	
18	69	(United Kingdom) Tom Booth-Amos	KTM	15	+31.008	30	
19	71	(Japan) Ayumu Sasaki	Honda	15	+43.939	20	
20	75	(Spain) Albert Arenas	KTM	14	+1 lap	19	
21	48	(Italy) Lorenzo Dalla Porta	Honda	12	+3 laps	7	
NC	21	(Spain) Alonso López	Honda	9	+6 laps (Note: Not classified due to not completing enough laps.)	14	
Ret	25	(Spain) Raúl Fernández	KTM	6	Accident Damage	15	
Ret	14	(Italy) Tony Arbolino	Honda	3	Accident	11	
Ret	17	(United Kingdom) John McPhee	Honda	3	Accident	12	
Ret	40	(South Africa) Darryn Binder	KTM	2	Accident	31 (Note: Pit lane start penalty.)	
DNS	5	(Spain) Jaume Masiá	KTM	0	Did not restart	3	
DNS	99	(Spain) Carlos Tatay	KTM	0	Did not restart	10	
DNS	23	(Italy) Niccolò Antonelli	Honda	0	Did not restart	13	
DNS	52	(Spain) Jeremy Alcoba	Honda	0	Did not restart	18	
DNS	7	(Italy) Dennis Foggia	KTM	0	Did not restart	21	
OFFICIAL MOTO3 REPORT

=== MotoE ===
==== Race 1 ====
Pos.	No.	Rider	Laps	Time/Retired	Grid	Points
1	51	(Brazil) Eric Granado	7	11:49.900	1	25
2	38	(United Kingdom) Bradley Smith	7	+0.706	3	20
3	11	(Italy) Matteo Ferrari	7	+3.213	2	16
4	10	(Belgium) Xavier Siméon	7	+6.310	6	13
5	5	(San Marino) Alex de Angelis	7	+7.383	9	11
6	7	(Italy) Niccolò Canepa	7	+7.732	7	10
7	2	(Switzerland) Jesko Raffin	7	+8.888	4	9
8	16	(Australia) Joshua Hook	7	+9.634	10	8
9	27	(Italy) Mattia Casadei	7	+10.676	13	7
10	63	(France) Mike Di Meglio	7	+10.923	12	6
11	15	(Spain) Sete Gibernau	7	+12.177	8	5
12	14	(France) Randy de Puniet	7	+15.569	15	4
13	18	(Spain) Nicolás Terol	7	+15.783	17	3
14	6	(Spain) María Herrera	7	+15.821	14	2
15	32	(Italy) Lorenzo Savadori	7	+16.165	11	1
16	78	(France) Kenny Foray	7	+21.668	16	
DSQ	4	(Spain) Héctor Garzó	7	(+0.576) (Note: Disqualified for a technical infringement.)	5	
DNS	44	(France) Lucas Mahias		Did not start		
OFFICIAL MOTOE RACE 1 REPORT

- All bikes manufactured by Energica.

==== Race 2 ====
Pos.	No.	Rider	Laps	Time/Retired	Grid	Points
1	51	(Brazil) Eric Granado	7	11:52.860	1	25
2	38	(United Kingdom) Bradley Smith	7	+0.458	3	20
3	4	(Spain) Héctor Garzó	7	+4.124	5	16
4	5	(San Marino) Alex de Angelis	7	+7.003	9	13
5	11	(Italy) Matteo Ferrari	7	+7.405	2	11
6	63	(France) Mike Di Meglio	7	+9.475	12	10
7	15	(Spain) Sete Gibernau	7	+9.513	8	9
8	27	(Italy) Mattia Casadei	7	+10.503	13	8
9	18	(Spain) Nicolás Terol	7	+14.613	17	7
10	2	(Switzerland) Jesko Raffin	7	+14.711	4	6
11	14	(France) Randy de Puniet	7	+15.202	15	5
12	6	(Spain) María Herrera	7	+17.166	14	4
13	32	(Italy) Lorenzo Savadori	7	+19.552	11	3
14	78	(France) Kenny Foray	7	+29.432	16	2
Ret	10	(Belgium) Xavier Siméon	0	Accident	6	
Ret	7	(Italy) Niccolò Canepa	0	Accident	7	
Ret	16	(Australia) Joshua Hook	0	Accident	10	
DNS	44	(France) Lucas Mahias		Did not start		
OFFICIAL MOTOE RACE 2 REPORT

- All bikes manufactured by Energica.

== Championship standings after the race ==
=== MotoGP ===
Pos.	Rider	Points
1	(Spain) Marc Márquez	420
2	(Italy) Andrea Dovizioso	269
3	(Spain) Maverick Viñales	211
4	(Spain) Álex Rins	205
5	(France) Fabio Quartararo	192
6	(Italy) Danilo Petrucci	176
7	(Italy) Valentino Rossi	174
8	(Australia) Jack Miller	165
9	(United Kingdom) Cal Crutchlow	133
10	(Italy) Franco Morbidelli	115

=== Moto2 ===
Pos.	Rider	Points
1	(Spain) Álex Márquez	262
2	(South Africa) Brad Binder	259
3	(Switzerland) Thomas Lüthi	250
4	(Spain) Jorge Navarro	226
5	(Spain) Augusto Fernández	207
6	(Italy) Luca Marini	190
7	(Italy) Lorenzo Baldassarri	171
8	(Germany) Marcel Schrötter	137
9	(Italy) Fabio Di Giannantonio	108
10	(Italy) Enea Bastianini	97

=== Moto3 ===
Pos.	Rider	Points
1	(Italy) Lorenzo Dalla Porta	279
2	(Spain) Arón Canet	200
3	(Spain) Marcos Ramírez	183
4	(Italy) Tony Arbolino	175
5	(United Kingdom) John McPhee	156
6	(Italy) Celestino Vietti	135
7	(Italy) Niccolò Antonelli	128
8	(Japan) Tatsuki Suzuki	124
9	(Spain) Jaume Masiá	121
10	(Japan) Ai Ogura	109

=== MotoE ===
Pos.	Rider	Points
1	(Italy) Matteo Ferrari	99
2	(United Kingdom) Bradley Smith	88
3	(Brazil) Eric Granado	71
4	(Spain) Héctor Garzó	69
5	(France) Mike Di Meglio	63
6	(Belgium) Xavier Siméon	58
7	(San Marino) Alex de Angelis	47
8	(Switzerland) Jesko Raffin	47
9	(Italy) Niccolò Canepa	46
10	(Italy) Mattia Casadei	39

== Notes ==
Previous race: 2019 Malaysian Grand Prix	FIM Grand Prix World Championship; 2019 season	Next race: 2020 Qatar Grand Prix
Previous race: 2018 Valencian Grand Prix	Valencian Community motorcycle Grand Prix	Next race: 2020 Valencian Grand Prix
