= 2018 Red Bull MotoGP Rookies Cup =

Motorcycle racing competition

2018 Red Bull MotoGP Rookies Cup
Previous:	2017	Next:	2019

The 2018 Red Bull MotoGP Rookies Cup was the twelfth season of the Red Bull MotoGP Rookies Cup. The season, for the sixth year contested by the riders on equal KTM 250cc 4-stroke Moto3 bikes, was held over 12 races in seven meetings on the Grand Prix motorcycle racing calendar, beginning at Jerez on 5 May and ending on 23 September at MotorLand Aragón. Turkish rider Can Öncü won the championship, securing the title after the Misano race.

== Calendar ==
2018 calendar
Round	Date	Circuit	Pole position	Fastest lap	Race winner	Sources
1	5 May	(Spain) Jerez	(Spain) Carlos Tatay	(Turkey) Deniz Öncü	(Turkey) Can Öncü	
1	6 May	(Spain) Jerez	(Spain) Carlos Tatay	(Japan) Ryusei Yamanaka	(Spain) Carlos Tatay	
2	2 June	(Italy) Mugello	(Brazil) Meikon Kawakami	(Spain) Adrián Huertas	(Japan) Yuki Kunii	
3	30 June	(Netherlands) Assen	(Turkey) Can Öncü	(Japan) Ryusei Yamanaka	(Turkey) Can Öncü	
3	1 July	(Netherlands) Assen	(Turkey) Can Öncü	(Turkey) Can Öncü	(Turkey) Can Öncü	
4	14 July	(Germany) Sachsenring	(Turkey) Can Öncü	(Japan) Ryusei Yamanaka	(Turkey) Deniz Öncü	
4	15 July	(Germany) Sachsenring	(Turkey) Can Öncü	(Spain) Adrián Carrasco	(Turkey) Can Öncü	
5	11 August	(Austria) Spielberg	(Japan) Ryusei Yamanaka	(Turkey) Can Öncü	(Japan) Ryusei Yamanaka	
5	12 August	(Austria) Spielberg	(Japan) Ryusei Yamanaka	(Turkey) Deniz Öncü	(Spain) Xavier Artigas	
6	8 September	(San Marino) Misano	(Turkey) Can Öncü	(Spain) Adrián Carrasco	(Turkey) Can Öncü	
7	22 September	Aragon	(Spain) Xavier Artigas	(Spain) Xavier Artigas	(Turkey) Deniz Öncü	
7	23 September	Aragon	(Spain) Xavier Artigas	(United Kingdom) Max Cook	(Turkey) Deniz Öncü	

== Entry list ==
2018 entry list
No.	Rider	Rounds
3	(Italy) Pasquale Alfano	All
5	(Denmark) Simon Jespersen	All
6	(Japan) Ryusei Yamanaka	All
7	(Belgium) Barry Baltus	All
11	(United Kingdom) Dan Jones	All
12	(Czech Republic) Filip Salač	All
19	(Belgium) Sasha De Vits	All
22	(Finland) Peetu Paavilainen	All
24	(Spain) Xavier Artigas	All
28	(Spain) Adrián Carrasco	All
29	(Australia) Billy Van Eerde	All
30	(United Kingdom) Max Cook	All
31	(Indonesia) Gerry Salim	All
40	(United States) Sean Dylan Kelly	All
43	(Colombia) Steward García	All
44	(Colombia) Nicolás Hernández	All
53	(Turkey) Deniz Öncü	All
61	(Turkey) Can Öncü	All
62	(South Africa) Aidan Liebenberg	1–5, 7
66	(Spain) Adrián Huertas	All
83	(Brazil) Meikon Kawakami	All
88	(Italy) Matteo Patacca	1–2, 4
92	(Japan) Yuki Kunii	1–2, 5–7
99	(Spain) Carlos Tatay	All

== Championship standings ==
Points were awarded to the top fifteen riders, provided the rider finished the race.

Position	**1st**	**2nd**	**3rd**	**4th**	**5th**	**6th**	**7th**	**8th**	**9th**	**10th**	**11th**	**12th**	**13th**	**14th**	**15th**
Points	25	20	16	13	11	10	9	8	7	6	5	4	3	2	1

Pos.	Rider	JER (Spain)		MUG (Italy)	ASS (Netherlands)		SAC (Germany)		RBR (Austria)		MIS (San Marino)	ARA (Aragon)		Pts
1	(Turkey) Can Öncü	1	2	2	**1**	**1**	**2**	**1**	3	2	**1**	10	8	235
2	(Turkey) Deniz Öncü	4	3	6	4	5	1	2	4	4	8	1	1	192
3	(Spain) Xavier Artigas	5	15	5	2	3	7	5	2	1	5	**2**	**5**	166
4	(Czech Republic) Filip Salač	3	4	10	5	2	4	3	5	3	2	Ret	7	151
5	(Spain) Carlos Tatay	**2**	**1**	4	8	Ret	9	7	6	6	6	3	2	148
6	(Japan) Ryusei Yamanaka	6	5	9	3	Ret	3	6	**1**	**7**	4	8	3	141
7	(Spain) Adrián Carrasco	9	23	3	7	Ret	5	4	DSQ	Ret	3	5	Ret	83
8	(Colombia) Steward García	16	8	12	12	Ret	6	9	7	5	Ret	4	6	76
9	(Japan) Yuki Kunii	11	6	1					Ret	9	Ret	6	4	70
10	(United States) Sean Dylan Kelly	8	7	11	6	Ret	Ret	8	10	11	Ret	9	9	65
11	(Belgium) Barry Baltus	7	11	13	9	4	11	11	16	12	15	11	13	60
12	(Spain) Adrián Huertas	14	10	7	10	9	10	10	DNS	DNS	13	15	15	47
13	(Finland) Peetu Paavilainen	Ret	12	16	20	6	Ret	12	8	10	11	16	10	43
14	(Brazil) Meikon Kawakami	10	16	**8**	16	Ret	18	17	13	13	7	19	11	34
15	(United Kingdom) Dan Jones	12	14	14	Ret	10	Ret	13	Ret	Ret	9	7	18	33
16	(Belgium) Sasha De Vits	15	13	22	11	7	14	14	15	17	10	18	19	29
17	(Indonesia) Gerry Salim	23	19	Ret	14	8	Ret	15	Ret	8	Ret	17	12	23
18	(United Kingdom) Max Cook	13	20	Ret	15	11	8	NC	Ret	DNS	16	12	14	23
19	(Australia) Billy Van Eerde	19	17	15	13	Ret	15	18	9	Ret	14	14	Ret	16
20	(Italy) Pasquale Alfano	18	21	18	18	12	13	Ret	12	15	Ret	Ret	Ret	12
21	(Italy) Matteo Patacca	20	9	17			12	Ret						11
22	(Colombia) Nicolás Hernández	21	22	20	Ret	13	17	20	11	14	Ret	20	16	10
23	(Denmark) Simon Jespersen	17	18	19	19	Ret	Ret	16	14	16	12	13	17	9
24	(South Africa) Aidan Liebenberg	22	24	21	17	Ret	16	19	DNS	DNS		DNS	DNS	0
Pos.	Rider	JER (Spain)		MUG (Italy)	ASS (Netherlands)		SAC (Germany)		RBR (Austria)		MIS (San Marino)	ARA (Aragon)		Pts

Colour	Result
Gold	Winner
Silver	Second place
Bronze	Third place
Green	Points classification
Blue	Non-points classification
Blue	Non-classified finish (NC)
Purple	Retired, not classified (Ret)
Red	Did not qualify (DNQ)
Red	Did not pre-qualify (DNPQ)
Black	Disqualified (DSQ)
White	Did not start (DNS)
White	Withdrew (WD)
White	Race cancelled (C)
Blank	Did not practice (DNP)
Blank	Did not arrive (DNA)
Blank	Excluded (EX)

**Bold** – Pole position
Italics – Fastest lap
