= 2018 Valencian Community motorcycle Grand Prix =

2018 Valencian Community Grand Prix
Race details
- Race 19 of 19 races in the 2018 Grand Prix motorcycle racing season
- Date: 18 November 2018
- Official name: Gran Premio Motul de la Comunitat Valenciana
- Location: Circuit Ricardo Tormo
- Course: Permanent racing facility; 4.005 km (2.489 mi)

MotoGP
Pole position
Rider	(Spain) Maverick Viñales	Yamaha
Time	1:31.312	
Fastest lap
Rider	(Italy) Andrea Dovizioso	Ducati
Time	1:41.863 on lap 6	
Podium
First	(Italy) Andrea Dovizioso	Ducati
Second	(Spain) Álex Rins	Suzuki
Third	(Spain) Pol Espargaró	KTM

Moto2
Pole position
Rider	(Italy) Luca Marini	Kalex
Time	1:35.777	
Fastest lap
Rider	(Spain) Álex Márquez	Kalex
Time	1:47.089 on lap 13	
Podium
First	(Portugal) Miguel Oliveira	KTM
Second	(Spain) Iker Lecuona	KTM
Third	(Spain) Álex Márquez	Kalex

Moto3
Pole position
Rider	(Italy) Tony Arbolino	Honda
Time	1:46.773	
Fastest lap
Rider	(Italy) Tony Arbolino	Honda
Time	1:51.172 on lap 8	
Podium
First	(Turkey) Can Öncü	KTM
Second	(Spain) Jorge Martín	Honda
Third	(United Kingdom) John McPhee	KTM

The 2018 Valencian Community motorcycle Grand Prix was the nineteenth and final round of the 2018 MotoGP season. It was held at the Circuit Ricardo Tormo in Valencia on 18 November 2018.

In the Moto3 race, Red Bull KTM Ajo wildcard Can Öncü made history by winning on his debut, becoming the youngest ever Grand Prix winner at the age of 15 years, 115 days.

In the MotoGP class, no Yamaha or Honda rider finished on the podium for the first time since the 2007 San Marino Grand Prix.

In the Moto2 class, this was the final race for the Honda CBR600RR inline-4 engine package and also the final race for the Tech 3 Mistral 610 and Suter MMX2 chassis packages that débuted at the 2010 Qatar Grand Prix, since a new 765cc (46.7 cu in) inline-3 engine supplied by Triumph Motorcycles was introduced and Tech 3 and Forward Racing switched manufacturers to KTM and MV Agusta respectively in 2019.

== Classification ==
=== MotoGP ===
The race, scheduled to be run for 27 laps, was red-flagged after 13 full laps, as heavy rain had caused multiple riders to crash and racing conditions were deemed too dangerous. For the restart, the race distance was 14 laps.

Pos.	No.	Rider	Team	Manufacturer	Laps	Time/Retired	Grid	Points
1	4	(Italy) Andrea Dovizioso	Ducati Team	Ducati	14	24:03.408	3	25
2	42	(Spain) Álex Rins	Team Suzuki Ecstar	Suzuki	14	+2.750	2	20
3	44	(Spain) Pol Espargaró	Red Bull KTM Factory Racing	KTM	14	+7.406	6	16
4	51	(Italy) Michele Pirro	Ducati Team	Ducati	14	+8.647	12	13
5	26	(Spain) Dani Pedrosa	Repsol Honda Team	Honda	14	+13.351	9	11
6	30	(Japan) Takaaki Nakagami	LCR Honda Idemitsu	Honda	14	+32.288	14	10
7	5	(France) Johann Zarco	Monster Yamaha Tech 3	Yamaha	14	+32.806	11	9
8	38	(United Kingdom) Bradley Smith	Red Bull KTM Factory Racing	KTM	14	+33.111	22	8
9	6	(Germany) Stefan Bradl	LCR Honda Castrol	Honda	14	+36.376	20	7
10	55	(Malaysia) Hafizh Syahrin	Monster Yamaha Tech 3	Yamaha	14	+37.198	21	6
11	45	(United Kingdom) Scott Redding	Aprilia Racing Team Gresini	Aprilia	14	+44.326	24	5
12	99	(Spain) Jorge Lorenzo	Ducati Team	Ducati	14	+46.146	13	4
13	46	(Italy) Valentino Rossi	Movistar Yamaha MotoGP	Yamaha	14	+52.809	16	3
14	17	(Czech Republic) Karel Abraham	Ángel Nieto Team	Ducati	14	+1:10.628	18	2
15	81	(Spain) Jordi Torres	Reale Avintia Racing	Ducati	14	+1:16.739	23	1
Ret	19	(Spain) Álvaro Bautista	Ángel Nieto Team	Ducati	7	Accident	19	
Ret	25	(Spain) Maverick Viñales	Movistar Yamaha MotoGP	Yamaha		Did not restart	1	
Ret	9	(Italy) Danilo Petrucci	Alma Pramac Racing	Ducati		Did not restart	4	
Ret	93	(Spain) Marc Márquez	Repsol Honda Team	Honda		Did not restart	5	
Ret	29	(Italy) Andrea Iannone	Team Suzuki Ecstar	Suzuki		Did not restart	7	
Ret	41	(Spain) Aleix Espargaró	Aprilia Racing Team Gresini	Aprilia		Did not restart	8	
Ret	43	(Australia) Jack Miller	Alma Pramac Racing	Ducati		Did not restart	10	
Ret	21	(Italy) Franco Morbidelli	EG 0,0 Marc VDS	Honda		Did not restart	15	
Ret	12	(Switzerland) Thomas Lüthi	EG 0,0 Marc VDS	Honda		Did not restart	17	
DNS	10	(Belgium) Xavier Siméon	Reale Avintia Racing	Ducati		Did not start		
Sources:

- Xavier Siméon was declared unfit to start the race following two crashes in practice.

=== Moto2 ===
Pos.	No.	Rider	Manufacturer	Laps	Time/Retired	Grid	Points
1	44	(Portugal) Miguel Oliveira	KTM	25	45:07.639	10	25
2	27	(Spain) Iker Lecuona	KTM	25	+13.201	21	20
3	73	(Spain) Álex Márquez	Kalex	25	+22.175	16	16
4	54	(Italy) Mattia Pasini	Kalex	25	+28.892	14	13
5	87	(Australia) Remy Gardner	Tech 3	25	+30.106	17	11
6	20	(France) Fabio Quartararo	Speed Up	25	+32.126	9	10
7	23	(Germany) Marcel Schrötter	Kalex	25	+33.086	3	9
8	40	(Spain) Augusto Fernández	Kalex	25	+33.950	8	8
9	5	(Italy) Andrea Locatelli	Kalex	25	+35.707	18	7
10	24	(Italy) Simone Corsi	Kalex	25	+37.019	13	6
11	77	(Switzerland) Dominique Aegerter	KTM	25	+43.844	24	5
12	45	(Japan) Tetsuta Nagashima	Kalex	25	+45.871	20	4
13	4	(South Africa) Steven Odendaal	NTS	25	+49.113	22	3
14	42	(Italy) Francesco Bagnaia	Kalex	25	+53.288	4	2
15	2	(Switzerland) Jesko Raffin	Kalex	25	+1:08.712	12	1
16	32	(Spain) Isaac Viñales	Suter	25	+1:25.666	28	
17	18	(Andorra) Xavi Cardelús	Kalex	25	+1:32.166	29	
18	95	(France) Jules Danilo	Kalex	25	+1:47.502	30	
19	21	(Italy) Federico Fuligni	Kalex	24	+1 lap	27	
20	3	(Germany) Lukas Tulovic	Suter	24	+1 lap	31	
Ret	66	(Finland) Niki Tuuli	Kalex	19	Accident Damage	25	
Ret	97	(Spain) Xavi Vierge	Kalex	13	Accident Damage	2	
Ret	16	(United States) Joe Roberts	NTS	8	Accident	19	
Ret	70	(Italy) Tommaso Marcon	Speed Up	7	Accident	26	
Ret	9	(Spain) Jorge Navarro	Kalex	5	Accident	23	
Ret	41	(South Africa) Brad Binder	KTM	3	Accident	11	
Ret	22	(United Kingdom) Sam Lowes	KTM	3	Accident	6	
Ret	89	(Malaysia) Khairul Idham Pawi	Kalex	2	Accident	15	
Ret	10	(Italy) Luca Marini	Kalex	0	Accident	1	
Ret	7	(Italy) Lorenzo Baldassarri	Kalex	0	Accident	5	
Ret	36	(Spain) Joan Mir	Kalex	0	Accident	7	
DNS	14	(Spain) Héctor Garzó	Tech 3		Did not start		
OFFICIAL MOTO2 REPORT

=== Moto3 ===
Pos.	No.	Rider	Manufacturer	Laps	Time/Retired	Grid	Points
1	61	(Turkey) Can Öncü	KTM	23	43:06.370	4	25
2	88	(Spain) Jorge Martín	Honda	23	+4.071	13	20
3	17	(United Kingdom) John McPhee	KTM	23	+6.130	3	16
4	21	(Italy) Fabio Di Giannantonio	Honda	23	+12.897	15	13
5	33	(Italy) Enea Bastianini	Honda	23	+14.735	14	11
6	5	(Spain) Jaume Masiá	KTM	23	+21.984	16	10
7	23	(Italy) Niccolò Antonelli	Honda	23	+26.641	25	9
8	41	(Thailand) Nakarin Atiratphuvapat	Honda	23	+30.758	2	8
9	42	(Spain) Marcos Ramírez	KTM	23	+33.411	7	7
10	31	(Italy) Celestino Vietti	KTM	23	+39.008	23	6
11	71	(Japan) Ayumu Sasaki	Honda	23	+42.332	24	5
12	81	(Italy) Stefano Nepa	KTM	23	+48.931	28	4
13	25	(Spain) Raúl Fernández	KTM	23	+54.434	10	3
14	16	(Italy) Andrea Migno	KTM	23	+54.585	27	2
15	84	(Czech Republic) Jakub Kornfeil	KTM	23	+56.424	8	1
16	22	(Japan) Kazuki Masaki	KTM	23	+57.222	22	
17	19	(Argentina) Gabriel Rodrigo	KTM	23	+1:00.541	29 (Note: 6-place grid penalty.)	
18	48	(Italy) Lorenzo Dalla Porta	Honda	23	+1:35.093	20	
19	40	(South Africa) Darryn Binder	KTM	22	+1 lap	19	
20	12	(Italy) Marco Bezzecchi	KTM	22	+1 lap	6	
Ret	77	(Spain) Vicente Pérez	KTM	21	Accident	12	
Ret	65	(Germany) Philipp Öttl	KTM	15	Handling	26	
Ret	14	(Italy) Tony Arbolino	Honda	11	Accident	1	
Ret	26	(Malaysia) Izam Ikmal	Honda	7	Accident	30	
Ret	75	(Spain) Albert Arenas	KTM	6	Accident	9	
Ret	27	(Japan) Kaito Toba	Honda	4	Accident	21	
Ret	10	(Italy) Dennis Foggia	KTM	1	Accident	17	
Ret	44	(Spain) Arón Canet	Honda	0	Accident	5	
Ret	72	(Spain) Alonso López	Honda	0	Accident	11	
Ret	24	(Japan) Tatsuki Suzuki	Honda	0	Accident	18	
OFFICIAL MOTO3 REPORT

== Championship standings after the race ==
- **Bold text** indicates the World Champions.

=== MotoGP ===
	Pos.	Rider	Points
	1	(Spain) **Marc Márquez**	321
	2	(Italy) Andrea Dovizioso	245
	3	(Italy) Valentino Rossi	198
	4	(Spain) Maverick Viñales	193
	5	(Spain) Álex Rins	169
	6	(France) Johann Zarco	158
	7	(United Kingdom) Cal Crutchlow	148
	8	(Italy) Danilo Petrucci	144
1	9	(Spain) Jorge Lorenzo	134
1	10	(Italy) Andrea Iannone	133

=== Moto2 ===
	Pos.	Rider	Points
	1	(Italy) **Francesco Bagnaia**	306
	2	(Portugal) Miguel Oliveira	297
	3	(South Africa) Brad Binder	201
1	4	(Spain) Álex Márquez	173
1	5	(Italy) Lorenzo Baldassarri	162
	6	(Spain) Joan Mir	155
	7	(Italy) Luca Marini	147
	8	(Germany) Marcel Schrötter	147
2	9	(Italy) Mattia Pasini	141
	10	(France) Fabio Quartararo	138

=== Moto3 ===
	Pos.	Rider	Points
	1	(Spain) **Jorge Martín**	260
1	2	(Italy) Fabio Di Giannantonio	218
1	3	(Italy) Marco Bezzecchi	214
	4	(Italy) Enea Bastianini	177
	5	(Italy) Lorenzo Dalla Porta	151
	6	(Spain) Arón Canet	128
	7	(Argentina) Gabriel Rodrigo	116
	8	(Czech Republic) Jakub Kornfeil	116
	9	(Spain) Albert Arenas	107
	10	(Spain) Marcos Ramírez	102

== Notes ==
Previous race: 2018 Malaysian Grand Prix	FIM Grand Prix World Championship; 2018 season	Next race: 2019 Qatar Grand Prix
Previous race: 2017 Valencian Grand Prix	Valencian Community motorcycle Grand Prix	Next race: 2019 Valencian Grand Prix
