= 2017 Red Bull MotoGP Rookies Cup =

Motorcycle racing competition

2017 Red Bull MotoGP Rookies Cup
Previous:	2016	Next:	2018

The 2017 Red Bull MotoGP Rookies Cup was the eleventh season of the Red Bull MotoGP Rookies Cup. The season, for the fifth year contested by the riders on equal KTM 250cc 4-stroke Moto3 bikes, was held over 13 races in seven meetings on the Grand Prix motorcycle racing calendar, beginning at Jerez on 6 May and ending on 24 September at the MotorLand Aragón. Japanese rider Kazuki Masaki won the championship, securing the title after the first Aragón race.

== Calendar ==
2017 calendar
Round	Date	Circuit	Pole position	Fastest lap	Race winner	Sources
1	6 May	(Spain) Jerez	(Japan) Ai Ogura	(Japan) Ai Ogura	(United Kingdom) Rory Skinner	
1	7 May	(Spain) Jerez	(Japan) Ai Ogura	(Czech Republic) Filip Salač	(Spain) Aleix Viu	
2	24 June	(Netherlands) Assen	(Turkey) Can Öncü	(Turkey) Can Öncü	(Turkey) Can Öncü	
2	25 June	(Netherlands) Assen	(Turkey) Can Öncü	(Turkey) Can Öncü	(Turkey) Can Öncü	
3	1 July	(Germany) Sachsenring	(Turkey) Can Öncü	(Turkey) Deniz Öncü	(Turkey) Deniz Öncü	
3	2 July	(Germany) Sachsenring	(Turkey) Can Öncü	(Japan) Kazuki Masaki	(Turkey) Can Öncü	
4	5 August	(Czech Republic) Brno	(Japan) Kazuki Masaki	(Turkey) Can Öncü	(Turkey) Can Öncü	
4	6 August	(Czech Republic) Brno	(Japan) Kazuki Masaki	(Turkey) Can Öncü	(Turkey) Deniz Öncü	
5	12 August	(Austria) Spielberg	(Japan) Ai Ogura	(Japan) Ryusei Yamanaka	(Japan) Ai Ogura	
5	13 August	(Austria) Spielberg	(Japan) Ai Ogura	(United Kingdom) Rory Skinner	(Japan) Kazuki Masaki	
6	9 September	(San Marino) Misano	(Spain) Aleix Viu	(Japan) Kazuki Masaki	(Japan) Ai Ogura	
7	23 September	Aragon	(Turkey) Can Öncü	(Turkey) Deniz Öncü	(Japan) Kazuki Masaki	
7	24 September	Aragon	(Turkey) Can Öncü	(Japan) Kazuki Masaki	(Spain) Aleix Viu	

== Entry list ==
2017 entry list
No.	Rider	Rounds
4	(United Kingdom) Dan Jones	1–3, 7
6	(Japan) Ryusei Yamanaka	All
9	(Belgium) Sasha de Vits	All
11	(Italy) Gabriele Giannini	All
12	(Czech Republic) Filip Salač	1, 4, 6–7
13	(Netherlands) Walid Soppe	1–6
14	(Germany) Matthias Meggle	All
19	(Italy) Lorenzo Bartalesi	All
20	(Italy) Omar Bonoli	All
21	(Netherlands) Victor Steeman	All
22	(Finland) Peetu Paavilainen	2–3, 6–7
24	(Spain) Xavier Artigas	All
28	(Spain) Adrián Carrasco	All
36	(Spain) Beatriz Neila	2–7
39	(Japan) Kazuki Masaki	All
40	(United States) Sean Kelly	All
43	(Colombia) Steward García	All
44	(Germany) Kevin Orgis	All
52	(Turkey) Deniz Öncü	All
65	(Turkey) Can Öncü	All
69	(United Kingdom) Rory Skinner	All
79	(Japan) Ai Ogura	1, 4–7
81	(Spain) Aleix Viu	All
82	(Netherlands) Loran Faber	All
83	(Brazil) Meikon Kawakami	All

== Championship standings ==
Points were awarded to the top fifteen riders, provided the rider finished the race.

Position	1st	2nd	3rd	4th	5th	6th	7th	8th	9th	10th	11th	12th	13th	14th	15th
Points	25	20	16	13	11	10	9	8	7	6	5	4	3	2	1

Pos.	Rider	JER (Spain)		ASS (Netherlands)		SAC (Germany)		BRN (Czech Republic)		RBR (Austria)		MIS (San Marino)	ARA (Aragon)		Pts
1	(Japan) Kazuki Masaki	3	5	2	3	10	3	**3**	**13**	2	1	2	1	21	194
2	(Spain) Aleix Viu	5	1	3	2	15	2	4	7	10	11	**3**	3	1	183
3	(Turkey) Can Öncü	18	3	**1**	**1**	**3**	**1**	1	Ret	14	2	Ret	**5**	**Ret**	165
4	(Turkey) Deniz Öncü	Ret	9	11	5	1	Ret	9	1	8	5	4	4	6	135
5	(Japan) Ai Ogura	**2**	**4**					19	11	**1**	**3**	1	2	19	124
6	(Japan) Ryusei Yamanaka	Ret	6	10	6	9	5	5	3	3	4	Ret	7	4	122
7	(Germany) Matthias Meggle	9	8	4	16	8	6	2	4	5	8	6	DNS	DNS	108
8	(Spain) Adrián Carrasco	Ret	10	DSQ	Ret	4	7	10	6	4	7	19	8	2	94
9	(Italy) Omar Bonoli	6	7	7	7	19	4	DNS	DNS	6	6	Ret	10	3	92
10	(Germany) Kevin Orgis	12	Ret	8	14	2	10	6	2	19	20	9	13	10	86
11	(Colombia) Steward García	8	Ret	15	4	5	9	11	Ret	7	10	10	11	8	79
12	(United Kingdom) Rory Skinner	1	Ret	5	9	17	15	12	Ret	Ret	9	13	9	7	74
13	(Czech Republic) Filip Salač	4	2					Ret	DNS			5	6	5	65
14	(Brazil) Meikon Kawakami	10	11	9	Ret	6	14	8	5	11	21	8	Ret	13	65
15	(Netherlands) Walid Soppe	Ret	Ret	6	18	12	8	7	12	12	12	Ret			43
16	(Spain) Xavier Artigas	11	17	18	11	7	13	13	NC	9	15	15	14	11	41
17	(United States) Sean Kelly	7	Ret	Ret	17	21	20	17	8	21	13	7	12	9	40
18	(Netherlands) Victor Steeman	Ret	12	17	12	23	11	15	9	17	Ret	12	15	14	28
19	(Belgium) Sasha de Vits	13	15	16	8	13	17	16	10	18	16	11	16	16	26
20	(Finland) Peetu Paavilainen			12	Ret	11	12					18	Ret	12	17
21	(United Kingdom) Dan Jones	17	16	13	10	14	Ret						Ret	DNS	11
22	(Italy) Gabriele Giannini	14	13	19	15	16	18	14	14	20	18	16	DSQ	15	11
23	(Netherlands) Loran Faber	16	18	14	13	18	16	Ret	16	13	14	Ret	19	20	10
24	(Italy) Lorenzo Bartalesi	15	14	20	Ret	20	19	18	15	15	19	14	18	18	7
25	(Spain) Beatriz Neila			Ret	19	22	21	20	17	16	17	17	17	17	0
Pos.	Rider	JER (Spain)		ASS (Netherlands)		SAC (Germany)		BRN (Czech Republic)		RBR (Austria)		MIS (San Marino)	ARA (Aragon)		Pts

Colour	Result
Gold	Winner
Silver	Second place
Bronze	Third place
Green	Points classification
Blue	Non-points classification
Blue	Non-classified finish (NC)
Purple	Retired, not classified (Ret)
Red	Did not qualify (DNQ)
Red	Did not pre-qualify (DNPQ)
Black	Disqualified (DSQ)
White	Did not start (DNS)
White	Withdrew (WD)
White	Race cancelled (C)
Blank	Did not practice (DNP)
Blank	Did not arrive (DNA)
Blank	Excluded (EX)

**Bold** – Pole position
Italics – Fastest lap
