= Can Öncü =

Turkish motorcycle racer (born 2003)

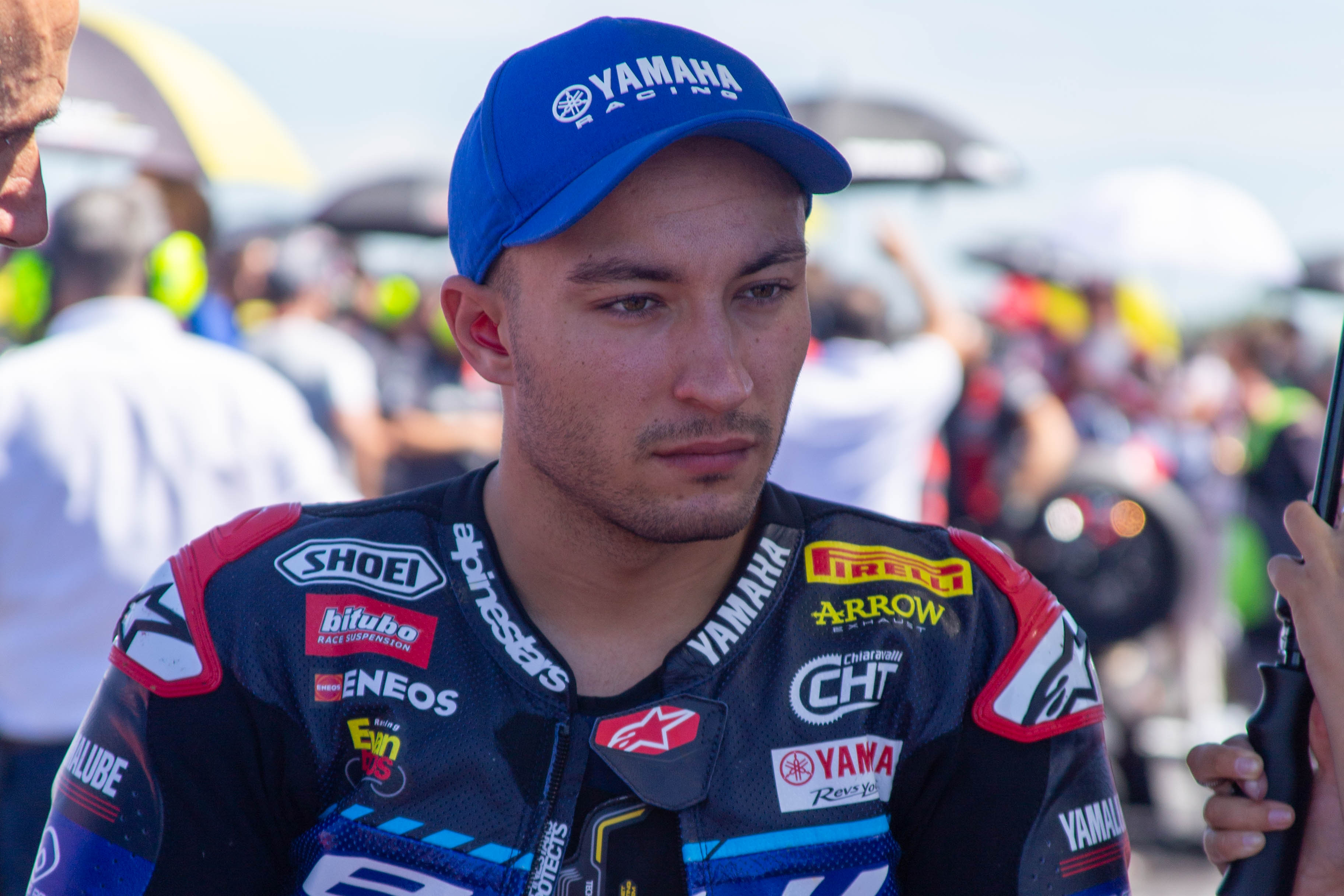
- Öncü, Donington World Supersport 2025
- Nationality: Turkish
- Born: 26 July 2003 (age 23); Alanya, Turkey
- Current team: Yamaha bLU cRU EvanBros Racing
- Bike number: 61
- Website: Öncü Twins
Motorcycle racing career statistics
Moto3 World Championship
Active years	2018–2019
Manufacturers	KTM
Championships	0
2019 championship position	31st (8 pts)
Starts / Wins / Podiums / Poles / F. laps / Points; 17 / 1 / 1 / 0 / 1 / 33
Supersport World Championship
Active years	2020–
Manufacturers	Kawasaki, Yamaha
Championships	0
2025 championship position	2nd (372 pts)
Starts / Wins / Podiums / Poles / F. laps / Points; 146 / 8 / 38 / 9 / 12 / 1327

Can Alexander Öncü (born 26 July 2003) is a Turkish motorcycle racer. After spending the 2019 season in Moto3, for 2020 and 2021, he raced in the World Supersport with Turkish Racing Team, a new venture headed by Turkish former racer Kenan Sofuoğlu and supported by Pucetti Kawasaki and Orelac Racing, Öncü continued, making 2024 his fifth year with the same team.

After a change in regulations during 2018, Öncü became the youngest Grand Prix motorcycle racing winner when he won the 2018 Valencian Community motorcycle Grand Prix aged 15 years, 115 days, and the first Turkish winner of a GP motorcycle road race.

In late 2018, Öncü was included into the provisional entry list for the 2019 Moto3 season with the Red Bull KTM Ajo team, despite being younger than the usual minimum age requirement of 16.

Öncüs twin brother, Deniz, is also a motorcycle racer. Both brothers are mentored by Turkish multi-world champion motorcycle racer, Kenan Sofuoğlu.

== Career ==
=== Early career ===
Can and his twin brother, Deniz, competed in the Asia Talent Cup in 2016 (Can 9th, Deniz 10th) and 2017 (Can 3rd, Deniz 1st). Both entered the Red Bull MotoGP Rookies Cup in 2017 (Can 3rd, Deniz 4th) and Can became the Red Bull MotoGP Rookies Cup champion in 2018, while Deniz finished in second place.

For 2018, as well as competing in the Rookies Cup, both Can and Deniz joined Ajo Motorsport and also raced in the FIM CEV Moto3 Junior World Championship. Later that year, Can became the first rider to win on his Grand Prix debut since Noboru Ueda in 1991. He also broke the record, held for ten years by previous youngest Grand Prix race winner Scott Redding, at age 15 years, 115 days at the Valencian GP, when he was entered as a wildcard rider. Öncü benefited from a 2018 change to the FIM regulations, that added the current Red Bull Rookies Cup Champion to an exemption already given to the FIM Junior World Championship winner allowing them to compete in Moto3, a series normally requiring an adult licence, at a minimum age of 15 years rather than the usual 16 years.

=== Moto3 World Championship ===
For 2019, Öncü made his full-season debut with Red Bull KTM Ajo. Despite his early promise shown as Red Bull Rookies champion and winning on his debut wildcard entry, Öncü struggled in the class, scoring only three points finishes from 16 contested races and finishing with eight points in 31st position of the riders' championship. Öncü was dropped from the Ajo team at the end of the season.

=== Supersport World Championship ===
For 2020, Öncü joined the Turkish Racing Team with Kawasaki in the Supersport World Championship. He achieved regular points finishes to complete the season in 12th place of the championship. He continued with the team for 2021, finishing regularly in the top-ten and taking his first podium at the French round.

=== CIV Supersport 600 Championship ===
In 2021, Öncü took part in the CIV championship as wildcard entries at Mugello.

== Career statistics ==
=== Career highlights ===
- 2021 : Kawasaki Puccetti Racing (CIV Supersport 600) #61

=== Asia Talent Cup ===
==== Races by year ====
(key) (Races in bold indicate pole position; races in italics indicate fastest lap)

Year	Bike	1	2	3	4	5	6	7	8	9	10	11	12	Pos	Pts
2016	Honda	THA1; 9	THA2; 13	QAT1; 13	QAT2; Ret	MAL1; 10	MAL2; Ret	CHN1; 7	CHN2; 9	JPN1; 8	JPN2; 5	SEP1; 15	SEP2; 2	9th	75
2017	Honda	THA1; 7	THA2; 4	QAT1; NC	QAT2; 4	SUZ1; 5	SUZ2; 15	MAL1; 1	MAL2; 1	JPN1; NC	JPN2; NC	SEP1; 1	SEP2; 1	3rd	147

=== FIM CEV Moto3 Junior World Championship ===
==== Races by year ====
(key) (Races in bold indicate pole position, races in italics indicate fastest lap)

Year	Bike	1	2	3	4	5	6	7	8	9	10	11	12	Pos	Pts
2018	KTM	EST; 15	VAL1; 10	VAL2; 17	LMS; 28	CAT1; 10	CAT2; 12	ARA; 3	JER1; 6	JER2; 10	ALB; 2	VAL1; 6	VAL2; 3	7th	95

=== Red Bull MotoGP Rookies Cup ===
==== Races by year ====
(key) (Races in bold indicate pole position, races in italics indicate fastest lap)

Year	1	2	3	4	5	6	7	8	9	10	11	12	13	Pos	Pts
2017	JER1; 18	JER2; 3	**ASS1**; 1	**ASS2**; 1	**SAC1**; 3	**SAC2**; 1	BRN1; 1	BRN2; Ret	RBR1; 14	RBR2; 2	MIS; Ret	**ARA1**; 5	**ARA2**; Ret	3rd	165
2018	JER1; 1	JER2; 2	MUG; 2	**ASS1**; 1	**ASS2**; 1	**SAC1**; 2	**SAC2**; 1	RBR1; 3	RBR2; 2	**MIS**; 1	ARA1; 10	ARA2; 8		1st	235

=== Grand Prix motorcycle racing ===
==== By season ====
Season	Class	Motorcycle	Team	Race	Win	Podium	Pole	FLap	Pts	Plcd
2018	Moto3	KTM	Red Bull KTM Ajo	1	1	1	0	0	25	24th
2019	Moto3	KTM	Red Bull KTM Ajo	16	0	0	0	1	8	31st
Total				**17**	**1**	**1**	**0**	**1**	**33**	

==== By class ====
Class	Seasons	1st GP	1st Pod	1st Win	Race	Win	Podiums	Pole	FLap	Pts	WChmp
Moto3	2018–2019	2018 Valencia	2018 Valencia	2018 Valencia	17	1	1	0	1	33	0
Total	2018–2019				**17**	**1**	**1**	**0**	**1**	**33**	**0**

==== Races by year ====
(key) (Races in bold indicate pole position, races in italics indicate fastest lap)

Year	Class	Bike	1	2	3	4	5	6	7	8	9	10	11	12	13	14	15	16	17	18	19	Pos	Pts
2018	Moto3	KTM	QAT	ARG	AME	SPA	FRA	ITA	CAT	NED	GER	CZE	AUT	GBR	RSM	ARA	THA	JPN	AUS	MAL	VAL; 1	24th	25
2019	Moto3	KTM	QAT; 18	ARG; 26	AME; Ret	SPA; 18	FRA; 16	ITA; 18	CAT; Ret	NED; 16	GER; 14	CZE; 14	AUT; Ret	GBR; 24	RSM; WD	ARA	THA	JPN; 18	AUS; 16	MAL; 20	VAL; 12	31st	8

=== Supersport World Championship ===
==== Races by year ====
(key) (Races in bold indicate pole position, races in italics indicate fastest lap)

Year	Bike	1		2		3		4		5		6		7		8		9		10		11		12		Pos	Pts
Year	Bike	R1	R2	R1	R2	R1	R2	R1	R2	R1	R2	R1	R2	R1	R2	R1	R2	R1	R2	R1	R2	R1	R2	R1	R2	Pos	Pts
2020	Kawasaki	AUS; 9		SPA; 9	SPA; 12	POR; Ret	POR; 10	SPA; 13	SPA; 13	SPA; Ret	SPA; Ret	SPA; 12	SPA; Ret	FRA; 6	FRA; 7	POR; 6	POR; 14									12th	65
2021	Kawasaki	SPA; 10	SPA; 14	POR; Ret	POR; 7	ITA; 8	ITA; Ret	NED; 7	NED; 7	CZE; 8	CZE; 9	SPA; 8	SPA; Ret	FRA; 8	FRA; 3	SPA; 4	SPA; Ret	SPA; C	SPA; 6	POR; 8	POR; 10	ARG; 3	ARG; 2	INA; 7	INA; 6	6th	182
2022	Kawasaki	SPA; 3	SPA; Ret	NED; Ret	NED; 3	POR; 4	POR; 5	ITA; 4	ITA; 5	GBR; 5	GBR; 8	CZE; 21	CZE; 4	FRA; 4	FRA; 6	SPA; 3	SPA; 2	POR; 9	POR; 3	ARG; 4	ARG; 7	INA; 3	INA; 3	AUS; 3	AUS; Ret	3rd	264
2023	Kawasaki	AUS; Ret	AUS; 3	INA; 1	INA; 4	NED; 7	NED; Ret	SPA	SPA	ITA	ITA	GBR	GBR	ITA	ITA	CZE	CZE	FRA; 17	FRA; 14	SPA; 17	SPA; 17	POR; 14	POR; 15	SPA; 11	SPA; 3	13th	89
2024	Kawasaki	AUS; Ret	AUS; 16	SPA; 8	SPA; 9	NED; 16	NED; 9	ITA; Ret	ITA; 29	GBR; 15	GBR; 12	CZE; 11	CZE; 10	POR; 11	POR; 7	FRA; 5	FRA; 9	ITA; 22	ITA; 8	SPA; 7	SPA; 11	POR; WD	POR; WD	SPA; 23	SPA; Ret	13th	92
2025	Yamaha	AUS; 5	AUS; 16	**POR**; 1	POR; Ret	**NED**; 3	NED; 1	ITA; NC	ITA; Ret	CZE; 2	CZE; 1	ITA; 3	ITA; 1	GBR; 5	GBR; 1	HUN; 2	HUN; 3	**FRA**; 2	FRA; 2	SPA; 2	SPA; 1	**POR**; 3	POR; 9	SPA; 3	SPA; 4	2nd	372
2026	Yamaha	AUS; 5	AUS; 5	**POR**; 25	POR; 8	NED; 10	NED; 3	HUN; 3	HUN; 2	**CZE**; 2	CZE; 2	SPA; 12	SPA; 11	**ITA**; 3	ITA; 10	**GBR**; 5	GBR; 8	FRA; 1	FRA; 4	ITA; 27	ITA; 11	**POR**; 21	POR; 4	SPA; 3	SPA; 4	4th	263

Sporting positions
Preceded by Kazuki Masaki	Red Bull MotoGP Rookies Cup champion 2018	Succeeded by Carlos Tatay
Records
Preceded by Scott Redding; 15 years, 170 days (2008 British motorcycle Grand Prix)	Youngest rider to win a motorcycle Grand Prix; 15 years, 115 days (2018 Valencian Community motorcycle Grand Prix)	Succeeded by Incumbent
