= 2021 Austrian motorcycle Grand Prix =

Eleventh round of the 2021 Grand Prix motorcycle racing season

(Austria) 2021 Austrian Grand Prix
Race details
- Race 11 of 18 races in the 2021 Grand Prix motorcycle racing season
- Date: 15 August 2021
- Official name: Bitci Motorrad Grand Prix von Österreich
- Location: Red Bull Ring; Spielberg, Styria, Austria
- Course: Permanent racing facility; 4.318 km (2.683 mi)

MotoGP
Pole position
Rider	(Spain) Jorge Martín	Ducati
Time	1:22.643	
Fastest lap
Rider	(France) Fabio Quartararo	Yamaha
Time	1:24.451 on lap 12	
Podium
First	(South Africa) Brad Binder	KTM
Second	(Italy) Francesco Bagnaia	Ducati
Third	(Spain) Jorge Martín	Ducati

Moto2
Pole position
Rider	(United Kingdom) Sam Lowes	Kalex
Time	1:28.659	
Fastest lap
Rider	(Thailand) Somkiat Chantra	Kalex
Time	1:29.193 on lap 5	
Podium
First	(Spain) Raúl Fernández	Kalex
Second	(Japan) Ai Ogura	Kalex
Third	(Spain) Augusto Fernández	Kalex

Moto3
Pole position
Rider	(Italy) Romano Fenati	Husqvarna
Time	1:35.850	
Fastest lap
Rider	(Spain) Izan Guevara	GasGas
Time	1:36.058 on lap 19	
Podium
First	(Spain) Sergio García	GasGas
Second	(Turkey) Deniz Öncü	KTM
Third	(Italy) Dennis Foggia	Honda

MotoE
Pole position
Rider	(Spain) Fermín Aldeguer	Energica
Time	1:35.306	
Fastest lap
Rider	(Brazil) Eric Granado	Energica
Time	1:35.161 on lap 4	
Podium
First	(Germany) Lukas Tulovic	Energica
Second	(Brazil) Eric Granado	Energica
Third	(Switzerland) Dominique Aegerter	Energica

The 2021 Austrian Grand Prix (officially known as the Bitci Motorrad Grand Prix von Österreich) was the eleventh round of the 2021 Grand Prix motorcycle racing season and the fifth round of the 2021 MotoE World Cup. It was held at the Red Bull Ring in Spielberg on 15 August 2021.

== Background ==
Yamaha suspended and withdrew Maverick Viñales from the entry list of the Grand Prix prior to the weekend for an “unexplained irregular operation of the motorcycle” after Round 10 in Styria.

== Qualifying ==
=== MotoGP ===
Fastest session lap

Pos.	No.	Biker	Constructor	Qualifying times		Final grid	Row
Pos.	No.	Biker	Constructor	Q1	Q2	Final grid	Row
1	89	(Spain) Jorge Martín	Ducati	1:23.197	1:22.643	1	1
2	20	(France) Fabio Quartararo	Yamaha	Qualified in Q2	1:22.677	2	1
3	63	(Italy) Francesco Bagnaia	Ducati	Qualified in Q2	1:23.063	3	1
4	5	(France) Johann Zarco	Ducati	Qualified in Q2	1:23.120	4	2
5	93	(Spain) Marc Márquez	Honda	Qualified in Q2	1:23.227	5	2
6	43	(Australia) Jack Miller	Ducati	Qualified in Q2	1:23.320	6	2
7	36	(Spain) Joan Mir	Suzuki	Qualified in Q2	1:23.378	7	3
8	41	(Spain) Aleix Espargaró	Aprilia	Qualified in Q2	1:23.423	8	3
9	88	(Portugal) Miguel Oliveira	KTM	1:23.365	1:23.499	9	3
10	33	(South Africa) Brad Binder	KTM	Qualified in Q2	1:23.568	10	4
11	44	(Spain) Pol Espargaró	Honda	Qualified in Q2	1:23.738	11	4
12	30	(Japan) Takaaki Nakagami	Honda	Qualified in Q2	1:23.990	12	4
13	42	(Spain) Álex Rins	Suzuki	1:23.470	N/A	13	5
14	73	(Spain) Álex Márquez	Honda	1:23.535	N/A	14	5
15	23	(Italy) Enea Bastianini	Ducati	1:23.790	N/A	15	5
16	27	(Spain) Iker Lecuona	KTM	1:23.825	N/A	16	6
17	10	(Italy) Luca Marini	Ducati	1:23.834	N/A	17	6
18	46	(Italy) Valentino Rossi	Yamaha	1:23.939	N/A	18	6
19	9	(Italy) Danilo Petrucci	KTM	1:24.405	N/A	19	7
20	35	(United Kingdom) Cal Crutchlow	Yamaha	1:24.509	N/A	20	7
OFFICIAL MOTOGP QUALIFYING RESULTS							7

== Race ==
=== MotoGP ===
Pos.	No.	Rider	Team	Manufacturer	Laps	Time/Retired	Grid	Points
1	33	(South Africa) Brad Binder	Red Bull KTM Factory Racing	KTM	28	40:43.928 (Note: Initially given a 3-second penalty for exceeding track limits, but was subsequently reversed.)	10	25
2	63	(Italy) Francesco Bagnaia	Ducati Lenovo Team	Ducati	28	+12.991	3	20
3	89	(Spain) Jorge Martín	Pramac Racing	Ducati	28	+14.570	1	16
4	36	(Spain) Joan Mir	Team Suzuki Ecstar	Suzuki	28	+15.623	7	13
5	10	(Italy) Luca Marini	Sky VR46 Avintia	Ducati	28	+17.831	17	11
6	27	(Spain) Iker Lecuona	Tech3 KTM Factory Racing	KTM	28	+17.952	16	10
7	20	(France) Fabio Quartararo	Monster Energy Yamaha MotoGP	Yamaha	28	+19.650	2	9
8	46	(Italy) Valentino Rossi	Petronas Yamaha SRT	Yamaha	28	+20.150	18	8
9	73	(Spain) Álex Márquez	LCR Honda Castrol	Honda	28	+20.692	14	7
10	41	(Spain) Aleix Espargaró	Aprilia Racing Team Gresini	Aprilia	28	+21.270	8	6
11	43	(Australia) Jack Miller	Ducati Lenovo Team	Ducati	28	+28.144	6	5
12	9	(Italy) Danilo Petrucci	Tech3 KTM Factory Racing	KTM	28	+28.193	19	4
13	30	(Japan) Takaaki Nakagami	LCR Honda Idemitsu	Honda	28	+28.603	12	3
14	42	(Spain) Álex Rins	Team Suzuki Ecstar	Suzuki	28	+33.642	13	2
15	93	(Spain) Marc Márquez	Repsol Honda Team	Honda	28	+38.459	5	1
16	44	(Spain) Pol Espargaró	Repsol Honda Team	Honda	28	+43.384	11	
17	35	(United Kingdom) Cal Crutchlow	Petronas Yamaha SRT	Yamaha	28	+55.950	20	
Ret	88	(Portugal) Miguel Oliveira	Red Bull KTM Factory Racing	KTM	22	Accident	9	
Ret	5	(France) Johann Zarco	Pramac Racing	Ducati	18	Accident Damage	4	
Ret	23	(Italy) Enea Bastianini	Avintia Esponsorama	Ducati	6	Lost Fairing	15	
Fastest lap: (France) Fabio Quartararo (Yamaha) – 1:24.451 (lap 12)

=== Moto2 ===
Pos.	No.	Rider	Manufacturer	Laps	Time/Retired	Grid	Points
1	25	(Spain) Raúl Fernández	Kalex	25	37:19.890	2	25
2	79	(Japan) Ai Ogura	Kalex	25	+0.845	3	20
3	37	(Spain) Augusto Fernández	Kalex	25	+2.747	4	16
4	22	(United Kingdom) Sam Lowes	Kalex	25	+4.412	1	13
5	35	(Thailand) Somkiat Chantra	Kalex	25	+8.850	7	11
6 (Note: 1-position penalty for exceeding track limits on the last lap.)	13	(Italy) Celestino Vietti	Kalex	25	+8.782	8	10
7	87	(Australia) Remy Gardner	Kalex	25	+13.657	5	9
8	44	(Spain) Arón Canet	Boscoscuro	25	+16.499	6	8
9	12	(Switzerland) Thomas Lüthi	Kalex	25	+17.108	10	7
10	72	(Italy) Marco Bezzecchi	Kalex	25	+19.588	16	6
11	96	(United Kingdom) Jake Dixon	Kalex	25	+21.283	13	5
12	21	(Italy) Fabio Di Giannantonio	Kalex	25	+21.703	15	4
13	14	(Italy) Tony Arbolino	Kalex	25	+21.866	23	3
14	97	(Spain) Xavi Vierge	Kalex	25	+27.146	20	2
15	40	(Spain) Héctor Garzó	Kalex	25	+29.128	22	1
16	16	(United States) Joe Roberts	Kalex	25	+33.058	21	
17	64	(Netherlands) Bo Bendsneyder	Kalex	25	+38.235	26	
18	55	(Malaysia) Hafizh Syahrin	NTS	25	+38.357	24	
19	24	(Italy) Simone Corsi	MV Agusta	25	+38.643	27	
20	6	(United States) Cameron Beaubier	Kalex	25	+44.344	25	
21	29	(Japan) Taiga Hada	Kalex	25	+46.490	30	
22	11	(Italy) Nicolò Bulega	Kalex	25	+47.560 (Note: 6-second penalty for not completing a double long lap penalty.)	18	
23	23	(Germany) Marcel Schrötter	Kalex	25	+1:05.584	11	
24	62	(Italy) Stefano Manzi	Kalex	25	+1:09.436	17	
Ret	5	(Italy) Yari Montella	Boscoscuro	15	Accident	28	
Ret	42	(Spain) Marcos Ramírez	Kalex	13	Accident	12	
Ret	70	(Belgium) Barry Baltus	NTS	10	Accident	29	
Ret	19	(Italy) Lorenzo Dalla Porta	Kalex	5	Accident	9	
Ret	75	(Spain) Albert Arenas	Boscoscuro	1	Master Cylinder	19	
Ret	9	(Spain) Jorge Navarro	Boscoscuro	0	Collision	14	
DNS	7	(Italy) Lorenzo Baldassarri	MV Agusta		Did not start		
OFFICIAL MOTO2 RACE REPORT

- Lorenzo Baldassarri was declared unfit to compete due to effects of a hand injury suffered at the German GP.

=== Moto3 ===
Pos.	No.	Rider	Manufacturer	Laps	Time/Retired	Grid	Points
1	11	(Spain) Sergio García	GasGas	23	37:10.345	13	25
2	53	(Turkey) Deniz Öncü	KTM	23	+0.027	5	20
3	7	(Italy) Dennis Foggia	Honda	23	+0.346	8	16
4	37	(Spain) Pedro Acosta	KTM	23	+0.394	7	13
5	55	(Italy) Romano Fenati	Husqvarna	23	+0.462	1	11
6	5	(Spain) Jaume Masiá	KTM	23	+0.794	4	10
7	17	(United Kingdom) John McPhee	Honda	23	+1.331	14	9
8	28	(Spain) Izan Guevara	GasGas	23	+1.440	10	8
9	40	(South Africa) Darryn Binder	Honda	23	+2.399	17	7
10	27	(Japan) Kaito Toba	KTM	23	+6.135	12	6
11	24	(Japan) Tatsuki Suzuki	Honda	23	+6.602	2	5
12	12	(Czech Republic) Filip Salač	KTM	23	+14.716	16	4
13	82	(Italy) Stefano Nepa	KTM	23	+14.920	9	3
14	52	(Spain) Jeremy Alcoba	Honda	23	+21.668	3	2
15	19	(Indonesia) Andi Farid Izdihar	Honda	23	+21.976	24	1
16	99	(Spain) Carlos Tatay	KTM	23	+22.147	15	
17	20	(France) Lorenzo Fellon	Honda	23	+22.161	22	
18	92	(Japan) Yuki Kunii	Honda	23	+22.198	19	
19	54	(Italy) Riccardo Rossi	KTM	23	+22.363	11	
20	2	(Argentina) Gabriel Rodrigo	Honda	23	+24.454	26 (Note: Pit lane start penalty.)	
21	38	(Spain) David Salvador	Honda	23	+24.706	18	
22	73	(Austria) Maximilian Kofler	KTM	23	+25.129 (Note: 3-second penalty for exceeding track limits.)	23	
23	22	(Italy) Elia Bartolini	KTM	23	+34.520	25	
Ret	31	(Spain) Adrián Fernández	Husqvarna	11	Engine	21	
Ret	71	(Japan) Ayumu Sasaki	KTM	5	Collision	6	
Ret	16	(Italy) Andrea Migno	Honda	0	Accident	20	
DNS	6	(Japan) Ryusei Yamanaka	KTM		Did not start		
OFFICIAL MOTO3 RACE REPORT

- Ryusei Yamanaka suffered a broken humerus in a collision with Gabriel Rodrigo during practice and withdrew from the event.

=== MotoE ===
Pos.	No.	Rider	Laps	Time/Retired	Grid	Points
1	3	(Germany) Lukas Tulovic	5	8:06.619	2	25
2	51	(Brazil) Eric Granado	5	+0.839	13	20
3	77	(Switzerland) Dominique Aegerter	5	+1.145	8	16
4	54	(Spain) Fermín Aldeguer	5	+1.163	1	13
5	78	(Japan) Hikari Okubo	5	+1.892	4	11
6	61	(Italy) Alessandro Zaccone	5	+2.371	5	10
7	40	(Spain) Jordi Torres	5	+2.424	7	9
8	11	(Italy) Matteo Ferrari	5	+4.805	3	8
9	21	(Italy) Kevin Zannoni	5	+5.199	11	7
10	68	(Colombia) Yonny Hernández	5	+5.510	9	6
11	9	(Italy) Andrea Mantovani	5	+7.068	15	5
12	71	(Spain) Miquel Pons	5	+8.296	10	4
13	19	(France) Corentin Perolari	5	+11.430	12	3
14	80	(Netherlands) Jasper Iwema	5	+12.233	16	2
15	43	(Italy) Stefano Valtulini	5	+14.950	17	1
16	14	(Portugal) André Pires	5	+15.561	18	
17	6	(Spain) María Herrera	5	+20.214	14	
18	18	(Andorra) Xavi Cardelús	5	+1:24.945	6	
OFFICIAL MOTOE RACE REPORT

- All bikes manufactured by Energica.

== Championship standings after the race ==
Below are the standings for the top five riders, constructors, and teams after the round.

=== MotoGP ===
Riders' Championship standings

	Pos.	Rider	Points
	1	(France) Fabio Quartararo	181
2	2	(Italy) Francesco Bagnaia	134
	3	(Spain) Joan Mir	134
2	4	(France) Johann Zarco	132
	5	(Australia) Jack Miller	105

Constructors' Championship standings

	Pos.	Constructor	Points
1	1	(Italy) Ducati	212
1	2	(Japan) Yamaha	209
	3	(Austria) KTM	152
	4	(Japan) Suzuki	138
	5	(Japan) Honda	104

Teams' Championship standings

	Pos.	Team	Points
	1	(Japan) Monster Energy Yamaha MotoGP	276
	2	(Italy) Ducati Lenovo Team	239
	3	(Italy) Pramac Racing	200
1	4	(Austria) Red Bull KTM Factory Racing	183
1	5	(Japan) Team Suzuki Ecstar	178

=== Moto2 ===
Riders' Championship standings

	Pos.	Rider	Points
	1	(Australia) Remy Gardner	206
	2	(Spain) Raúl Fernández	187
	3	(Italy) Marco Bezzecchi	159
	4	(United Kingdom) Sam Lowes	114
1	5	(Spain) Arón Canet	83

Constructors' Championship standings

Pos.	Constructor	Points
1	(Germany) Kalex	275
2	(Italy) Boscoscuro	109
3	(Italy) MV Agusta	10
4	(Japan) NTS	10

Teams' Championship standings

	Pos.	Team	Points
	1	(Finland) Red Bull KTM Ajo	393
	2	(Italy) Sky Racing Team VR46	201
	3	(Belgium) Elf Marc VDS Racing Team	196
3	4	(Japan) Idemitsu Honda Team Asia	115
	5	(Spain) Aspar Team Moto2	106

=== Moto3 ===
Riders' Championship standings

Pos.	Rider	Points
1	(Spain) Pedro Acosta	196
2	(Spain) Sergio García	155
3	(Italy) Romano Fenati	107
4	(Italy) Dennis Foggia	102
5	(Spain) Jaume Masiá	95

Constructors' Championship standings

Pos.	Constructor	Points
1	(Austria) KTM	235
2	(Japan) Honda	204
3	(Spain) GasGas	167
4	(Sweden) Husqvarna	111

Teams' Championship standings

	Pos.	Team	Points
	1	(Finland) Red Bull KTM Ajo	291
	2	(Spain) Santander Consumer GasGas	201
	3	(Malaysia) Petronas Sprinta Racing	135
1	4	(Luxembourg) Leopard Racing	132
1	5	(Italy) Sterilgarda Max Racing Team	123

=== MotoE ===
	Pos.	Rider	Points
	1	(Italy) Alessandro Zaccone	80
1	2	(Brazil) Eric Granado	73
1	3	(Spain) Jordi Torres	72
	4	(Switzerland) Dominique Aegerter	69
4	5	(Germany) Lukas Tulovic	53

== Notes ==
Previous race: 2021 Styrian Grand Prix	FIM Grand Prix World Championship; 2021 season	Next race: 2021 British Grand Prix
Previous race: 2020 Austrian Grand Prix	Austrian motorcycle Grand Prix	Next race: 2022 Austrian Grand Prix
