= 2021 British motorcycle Grand Prix =

Twelfth round of the 2021 Grand Prix motorcycle racing season

(United Kingdom) 2021 British Grand Prix
Race details
- Race 12 of 18 races in the 2021 Grand Prix motorcycle racing season
- Date: 29 August 2021
- Official name: Monster Energy British Grand Prix
- Location: Silverstone Circuit; Silverstone, United Kingdom
- Course: Permanent racing facility; 5.900 km (3.666 mi)

MotoGP
Pole position
Rider	(Spain) Pol Espargaró	Honda
Time	1:58.889	
Fastest lap
Rider	(France) Fabio Quartararo	Yamaha
Time	2:00.098 on lap 6	
Podium
First	(France) Fabio Quartararo	Yamaha
Second	(Spain) Álex Rins	Suzuki
Third	(Spain) Aleix Espargaró	Aprilia

Moto2
Pole position
Rider	(Italy) Marco Bezzecchi	Kalex
Time	2:03.988	
Fastest lap
Rider	(Spain) Jorge Navarro	Boscoscuro
Time	2:04.312 on lap 17	
Podium
First	(Australia) Remy Gardner	Kalex
Second	(Italy) Marco Bezzecchi	Kalex
Third	(Spain) Jorge Navarro	Boscoscuro

Moto3
Pole position
Rider	(Italy) Romano Fenati	Husqvarna
Time	2:11.325	
Fastest lap
Rider	(Spain) Izan Guevara	Gas Gas
Time	2:11.347 on lap 3	
Podium
First	(Italy) Romano Fenati	Husqvarna
Second	(Italy) Niccolò Antonelli	KTM
Third	(Italy) Dennis Foggia	Honda

The 2021 British Grand Prix (officially known as the Monster Energy British Grand Prix) was the twelfth round of the 2021 Grand Prix motorcycle racing season. It was held at the Silverstone Circuit in Silverstone on 29 August 2021.

== Qualifying ==
=== MotoGP ===
Fastest session lap

Pos.	No.	Biker	Constructor	Qualifying times		Final grid	Row
Pos.	No.	Biker	Constructor	Q1	Q2	Final grid	Row
1	44	(Spain) Pol Espargaró	Honda	Qualified in Q2	1:58.889	1	1
2	63	(Italy) Francesco Bagnaia	Ducati	Qualified in Q2	1:58.911	2	1
3	20	(France) Fabio Quartararo	Yamaha	Qualified in Q2	1:58.925	3	1
4	89	(Spain) Jorge Martín	Ducati	Qualified in Q2	1:59.074	4	2
5	93	(Spain) Marc Márquez	Honda	Qualified in Q2	1:59.086	5	2
6	41	(Spain) Aleix Espargaró	Aprilia	Qualified in Q2	1:59.273	6	2
7	43	(Australia) Jack Miller	Ducati	Qualified in Q2	1:59.368	7	3
8	46	(Italy) Valentino Rossi	Yamaha	Qualified in Q2	1:59.531	8	3
9	5	(France) Johann Zarco	Ducati	1:59.288	1:59.579	9	3
10	42	(Spain) Álex Rins	Suzuki	1:59.509	1:59.639	10	4
11	36	(Spain) Joan Mir	Suzuki	Qualified in Q2	1:59.763	11	4
12	33	(South Africa) Brad Binder	KTM	Qualified in Q2	1:59.977	12	4
13	23	(Italy) Enea Bastianini	Ducati	1:59.553	N/A	13	5
14	10	(Italy) Luca Marini	Ducati	1:59.764	N/A	14	5
15	30	(Japan) Takaaki Nakagami	Honda	1:59.881	N/A	15	5
16	9	(Italy) Danilo Petrucci	KTM	1:59.997	N/A	16	6
17	73	(Spain) Álex Márquez	Honda	2:00.117	N/A	17	6
18	27	(Spain) Iker Lecuona	KTM	2:00.131	N/A	18	6
19	35	(United Kingdom) Cal Crutchlow	Yamaha	2:00.217	N/A	19	7
20	88	(Portugal) Miguel Oliveira	KTM	2:00.391	N/A	20	7
21	96	(United Kingdom) Jake Dixon	Yamaha	2:00.869	N/A	21	7
OFFICIAL MOTOGP QUALIFYING RESULTS

== Race ==
=== MotoGP ===
Pos.	No.	Rider	Team	Manufacturer	Laps	Time/Retired	Grid	Points
1	20	(France) Fabio Quartararo	Monster Energy Yamaha MotoGP	Yamaha	20	40:20.579	3	25
2	42	(Spain) Álex Rins	Team Suzuki Ecstar	Suzuki	20	+2.663	10	20
3	41	(Spain) Aleix Espargaró	Aprilia Racing Team Gresini	Aprilia	20	+4.105	6	16
4	43	(Australia) Jack Miller	Ducati Lenovo Team	Ducati	20	+4.254	7	13
5	44	(Spain) Pol Espargaró	Repsol Honda Team	Honda	20	+8.462	1	11
6	33	(South Africa) Brad Binder	Red Bull KTM Factory Racing	KTM	20	+12.189	12	10
7	27	(Spain) Iker Lecuona	Tech3 KTM Factory Racing	KTM	20	+13.560	18	9
8	73	(Spain) Álex Márquez	LCR Honda Castrol	Honda	20	+14.044	17	8
9	36	(Spain) Joan Mir	Team Suzuki Ecstar	Suzuki	20	+16.226	11	7
10	9	(Italy) Danilo Petrucci	Tech3 KTM Factory Racing	KTM	20	+16.287	16	6
11	5	(France) Johann Zarco	Pramac Racing	Ducati	20	+16.339	9	5
12	23	(Italy) Enea Bastianini	Avintia Esponsorama	Ducati	20	+17.696	13	4
13	30	(Japan) Takaaki Nakagami	LCR Honda Idemitsu	Honda	20	+18.285	15	3
14	63	(Italy) Francesco Bagnaia	Ducati Lenovo Team	Ducati	20	+20.913	2	2
15	10	(Italy) Luca Marini	Sky VR46 Avintia	Ducati	20	+21.018	14	1
16	88	(Portugal) Miguel Oliveira	Red Bull KTM Factory Racing	KTM	20	+22.022	20	
17	35	(United Kingdom) Cal Crutchlow	Monster Energy Yamaha MotoGP	Yamaha	20	+23.232	19	
18	46	(Italy) Valentino Rossi	Petronas Yamaha SRT	Yamaha	20	+29.758	8	
19	96	(United Kingdom) Jake Dixon	Petronas Yamaha SRT	Yamaha	20	+50.845	21	
Ret	89	(Spain) Jorge Martín	Pramac Racing	Ducati	1	Collision Damage	4	
Ret	93	(Spain) Marc Márquez	Repsol Honda Team	Honda	0	Collision	5	
DNS	32	(Italy) Lorenzo Savadori	Aprilia Racing Team Gresini	Aprilia		Did not start		
Fastest lap: (France) Fabio Quartararo (Yamaha) – 2:00.098 (lap 6)
Sources:

- Lorenzo Savadori withdrew from the event due to effects of injury suffered at the Styrian Grand Prix.

=== Moto2 ===
Pos.	No.	Rider	Manufacturer	Laps	Time/Retired	Grid	Points
1	87	(Australia) Remy Gardner	Kalex	18	37:31.642	4	25
2	72	(Italy) Marco Bezzecchi	Kalex	18	+0.481	1	20
3	9	(Spain) Jorge Navarro	Boscoscuro	18	+1.930	2	16
4	22	(United Kingdom) Sam Lowes	Kalex	18	+2.284	3	13
5	21	(Italy) Fabio Di Giannantonio	Kalex	18	+6.952	6	11
6	37	(Spain) Augusto Fernández	Kalex	18	+7.059	7	10
7	44	(Spain) Arón Canet	Boscoscuro	18	+10.706	8	9
8	97	(Spain) Xavi Vierge	Kalex	18	+12.842	9	8
9	79	(Japan) Ai Ogura	Kalex	18	+12.877	14	7
10	16	(United States) Joe Roberts	Kalex	18	+14.344	10	6
11	12	(Switzerland) Thomas Lüthi	Kalex	18	+20.112	17	5
12	13	(Italy) Celestino Vietti	Kalex	18	+22.371	23	4
13	23	(Germany) Marcel Schrötter	Kalex	18	+22.525	15	3
14	11	(Italy) Nicolò Bulega	Kalex	18	+23.672	11	2
15	64	(Netherlands) Bo Bendsneyder	Kalex	18	+24.116	13	1
16	54	(Spain) Fermín Aldeguer	Boscoscuro	18	+26.847	16	
17	35	(Thailand) Somkiat Chantra	Kalex	18	+26.996	18	
18	14	(Italy) Tony Arbolino	Kalex	18	+27.206	22	
19	75	(Spain) Albert Arenas	Boscoscuro	18	+27.414	21	
20	42	(Spain) Marcos Ramírez	Kalex	18	+32.368	27	
21	55	(Malaysia) Hafizh Syahrin	NTS	18	+38.614	26	
22	24	(Italy) Simone Corsi	MV Agusta	18	+39.074	24	
23	70	(Belgium) Barry Baltus	NTS	18	+39.117	28	
Ret	25	(Spain) Raúl Fernández	Kalex	14	Accident	5	
Ret	6	(United States) Cameron Beaubier	Kalex	13	Accident	19	
Ret	77	(Malaysia) Adam Norrodin	Kalex	12	Arm Pump	29	
Ret	62	(Italy) Stefano Manzi	Kalex	9	Accident	12	
Ret	40	(Spain) Héctor Garzó	Kalex	5	Accident	20	
Ret	7	(Italy) Lorenzo Baldassarri	MV Agusta	3	Handling	25	
DNS	19	(Italy) Lorenzo Dalla Porta	Kalex		Did not start		
OFFICIAL MOTO2 RACE REPORT

- Lorenzo Dalla Porta withdrew from the event due to a shoulder injury.

=== Moto3 ===
Pos.	No.	Rider	Manufacturer	Laps	Time/Retired	Grid	Points
1	55	(Italy) Romano Fenati	Husqvarna	17	37:26.974	1	25
2	23	(Italy) Niccolò Antonelli	KTM	17	+1.679	5	20
3	7	(Italy) Dennis Foggia	Honda	17	+2.107	8	16
4	28	(Spain) Izan Guevara	Gas Gas	17	+2.154	11	13
5	24	(Japan) Tatsuki Suzuki	Honda	17	+7.475	13	11
6	5	(Spain) Jaume Masiá	KTM	17	+7.541	10	10
7	40	(South Africa) Darryn Binder	Honda	17	+7.559	16	9
8	53	(Turkey) Deniz Öncü	KTM	17	+14.523	9	8
9	54	(Italy) Riccardo Rossi	KTM	17	+14.541	3	7
10	99	(Spain) Carlos Tatay	KTM	17	+20.503	14	6
11	37	(Spain) Pedro Acosta	KTM	17	+21.898	22	5
12 (Note: 1-position penalty for exceeding track limits on the last lap.)	17	(United Kingdom) John McPhee	Honda	17	+21.859	15	4
13	71	(Japan) Ayumu Sasaki	KTM	17	+22.028	17	3
14	12	(Czech Republic) Filip Salač	KTM	17	+22.107	6	2
15	2	(Argentina) Gabriel Rodrigo	Honda	17	+22.157	2	1
16	11	(Spain) Sergio García	Gas Gas	17	+22.444	24	
17	82	(Italy) Stefano Nepa	KTM	17	+22.331	12	
18	43	(Spain) Xavier Artigas	Honda	17	+22.580	25	
19	31	(Spain) Adrián Fernández	Husqvarna	17	+25.215	19	
20	67	(Italy) Alberto Surra	Honda	17	+27.518	21	
21	52	(Spain) Jeremy Alcoba	Honda	17	+32.821	7	
22	20	(France) Lorenzo Fellon	Honda	17	+33.015	18	
23	6	(Japan) Ryusei Yamanaka	KTM	17	+33.310	20	
24	92	(Japan) Yuki Kunii	Honda	17	+52.820	23	
25	73	(Austria) Maximilian Kofler	KTM	17	+52.858	27	
Ret	16	(Italy) Andrea Migno	Honda	5	Mechanical	4	
Ret	27	(Japan) Kaito Toba	KTM	3	Accident	26	
OFFICIAL MOTO3 RACE REPORT

== Championship standings after the race ==
Below are the standings for the top five riders, constructors, and teams after the round.

=== MotoGP ===
Riders' Championship standings

	Pos.	Rider	Points
	1	(France) Fabio Quartararo	206
1	2	(Spain) Joan Mir	141
1	3	(France) Johann Zarco	137
2	4	(Italy) Francesco Bagnaia	136
	5	(Australia) Jack Miller	118

Constructors' Championship standings

	Pos.	Constructor	Points
1	1	(Japan) Yamaha	234
1	2	(Italy) Ducati	225
	3	(Austria) KTM	162
	4	(Japan) Suzuki	158
	5	(Japan) Honda	115

Teams' Championship standings

	Pos.	Team	Points
	1	(Japan) Monster Energy Yamaha MotoGP	301
	2	(Italy) Ducati Lenovo Team	254
	3	(Italy) Pramac Racing	205
1	4	(Japan) Team Suzuki Ecstar	205
1	5	(Austria) Red Bull KTM Factory Racing	193

=== Moto2 ===
Riders' Championship standings

Pos.	Rider	Points
1	(Australia) Remy Gardner	231
2	(Spain) Raúl Fernández	187
3	(Italy) Marco Bezzecchi	179
4	(United Kingdom) Sam Lowes	127
5	(Spain) Arón Canet	92

Constructors' Championship standings

Pos.	Constructor	Points
1	(Germany) Kalex	300
2	(Italy) Boscoscuro	125
3	(Italy) MV Agusta	10
4	(Japan) NTS	10

Teams' Championship standings

Pos.	Team	Points
1	(Finland) Red Bull KTM Ajo	418
2	(Italy) Sky Racing Team VR46	225
3	(Belgium) Elf Marc VDS Racing Team	219
4	(Japan) Idemitsu Honda Team Asia	122
5	(Spain) Kipin Energy Aspar Team	115

=== Moto3 ===
Riders' Championship standings

Pos.	Rider	Points
1	(Spain) Pedro Acosta	201
2	(Spain) Sergio García	155
3	(Italy) Romano Fenati	132
4	(Italy) Dennis Foggia	118
5	(Spain) Jaume Masiá	105

Constructors' Championship standings

Pos.	Constructor	Points
1	(Austria) KTM	255
2	(Japan) Honda	220
3	(Spain) Gas Gas	180
4	(Sweden) Husqvarna	136

Teams' Championship standings

	Pos.	Team	Points
	1	(Finland) Red Bull KTM Ajo	306
	2	(Spain) Valresa GasGas Aspar Team	214
1	3	(Luxembourg) Leopard Racing	148
1	4	(Italy) Sterilgarda Max Racing Team	148
2	5	(Malaysia) Petronas Sprinta Racing	148

== Notes ==
Previous race: 2021 Austrian Grand Prix	FIM Grand Prix World Championship; 2021 season	Next race: 2021 Aragon Grand Prix
Previous race: 2019 British Grand Prix	British motorcycle Grand Prix	Next race: 2022 British Grand Prix
