= 2021 Styrian motorcycle Grand Prix =

Tenth round of the 2021 Grand Prix motorcycle racing season

(Styria) 2021 Styrian Grand Prix
Race details
- Race 10 of 18 races in the 2021 Grand Prix motorcycle racing season
- Date: 8 August 2021
- Official name: Michelin Grand Prix of Styria
- Location: Red Bull Ring; Spielberg, Styria, Austria
- Course: Permanent racing facility; 4.318 km (2.683 mi)

MotoGP
Pole position
Rider	(Spain) Jorge Martín	Ducati
Time	1:22.994	
Fastest lap
Rider	(Spain) Joan Mir	Suzuki
Time	1:24.209 on lap 7	
Podium
First	(Spain) Jorge Martín	Ducati
Second	(Spain) Joan Mir	Suzuki
Third	(France) Fabio Quartararo	Yamaha

Moto2
Pole position
Rider	(Australia) Remy Gardner	Kalex
Time	1:28.668	
Fastest lap
Rider	(Japan) Ai Ogura	Kalex
Time	1:28.922 on lap 25	
Podium
First	(Italy) Marco Bezzecchi	Kalex
Second	(Spain) Arón Canet	Boscoscuro
Third	(Spain) Augusto Fernández	Kalex

Moto3
Pole position
Rider	(Turkey) Deniz Öncü	KTM
Time	1:36.453	
Fastest lap
Rider	(South Africa) Darryn Binder	Honda
Time	1:40.659 on lap 22	
Podium
First	(Spain) Pedro Acosta	KTM
Second	(Spain) Sergio García	Gas Gas
Third	(Italy) Romano Fenati	Husqvarna

The 2021 Styrian Grand Prix (officially known as the Michelin Grand Prix of Styria) was the tenth round of the 2021 Grand Prix motorcycle racing season. It was held at the Red Bull Ring in Spielberg on 8 August 2021.

== Background ==
On 14 May 2021, Dorna announced the cancellation of the Finnish Grand Prix (originally scheduled as the tenth round of the championship on 11 July) for a second consecutive year due to the COVID-19 situation in the country. On the same day Dorna announced that a second race at the Red Bull Ring, named the Styrian Grand Prix, which was originally scheduled to be a one-off race in 2020, would replace it on the calendar on 8 August, one week before the Austrian Grand Prix.

== Qualifying ==
=== MotoGP ===
Fastest session lap

Pos.	No.	Biker	Constructor	Qualifying times		Final grid	Row
Pos.	No.	Biker	Constructor	Q1	Q2	Final grid	Row
1	89	(Spain) Jorge Martín	Ducati	Qualified in Q2	1:22.994	1	1
2	63	(Italy) Francesco Bagnaia	Ducati	Qualified in Q2	1:23.038	2	1
3	20	(France) Fabio Quartararo	Yamaha	Qualified in Q2	1:23.075	3	1
4	43	(Australia) Jack Miller	Ducati	Qualified in Q2	1:23.300	4	2
5	36	(Spain) Joan Mir	Suzuki	Qualified in Q2	1:23.322	5	2
6	5	(France) Johann Zarco	Ducati	Qualified in Q2	1:23.376	6	2
7	41	(Spain) Aleix Espargaró	Aprilia	Qualified in Q2	1:23.448	7	3
8	93	(Spain) Marc Márquez	Honda	Qualified in Q2	1:23.489	8	3
9	12	(Spain) Maverick Viñales	Yamaha	Qualified in Q2	1:23.508	9	3
10	30	(Japan) Takaaki Nakagami	Honda	Qualified in Q2	1:23.536	10	4
11	73	(Spain) Álex Márquez	Honda	1:23.547	1:23.841	11	4
12	88	(Portugal) Miguel Oliveira	KTM	1:23.552	1:23.944	12	4
13	42	(Spain) Álex Rins	Suzuki	1:23.585	N/A	13	5
14	26	(Spain) Dani Pedrosa	KTM	1:23.730	N/A	14	5
15	44	(Spain) Pol Espargaró	Honda	1:23.971	N/A	15	5
16	33	(South Africa) Brad Binder	KTM	1:24.050	N/A	16	6
17	46	(Italy) Valentino Rossi	Yamaha	1:24.097	N/A	17	6
18	10	(Italy) Luca Marini	Ducati	1:24.115	N/A	18	6
19	27	(Spain) Iker Lecuona	KTM	1:24.141	N/A	19	7
20	23	(Italy) Enea Bastianini	Ducati	1:24.245	N/A	20	7
21	32	(Italy) Lorenzo Savadori	Aprilia	1:24.405	N/A	21	7
22	9	(Italy) Danilo Petrucci	KTM	1:24.465	N/A	22	8
23	35	(United Kingdom) Cal Crutchlow	Yamaha	1:24.513	N/A	23	8
OFFICIAL MOTOGP QUALIFYING RESULTS

== Race ==
=== MotoGP ===
The race, scheduled to be run for 28 laps, was red-flagged on lap 3 due to an accident involving Dani Pedrosa and Lorenzo Savadori. The race was later restarted over 27 laps with the original starting grid. Savadori wasn't able to join the restart.

Pos.	No.	Rider	Team	Manufacturer	Laps	Time/Retired	Grid	Points
1	89	(Spain) Jorge Martín	Pramac Racing	Ducati	27	38:07.879	1	25
2	36	(Spain) Joan Mir	Team Suzuki Ecstar	Suzuki	27	+1.548	5	20
3	20	(France) Fabio Quartararo	Monster Energy Yamaha MotoGP	Yamaha	27	+9.632	3	16
4	33	(South Africa) Brad Binder	Red Bull KTM Factory Racing	KTM	27	+12.771	16	13
5	30	(Japan) Takaaki Nakagami	LCR Honda Idemitsu	Honda	27	+12.923	10	11
6	5	(France) Johann Zarco	Pramac Racing	Ducati	27	+13.031	6	10
7	42	(Spain) Álex Rins	Team Suzuki Ecstar	Suzuki	27	+14.839	13	9
8	93	(Spain) Marc Márquez	Repsol Honda Team	Honda	27	+17.953	8	8
9	73	(Spain) Álex Márquez	LCR Honda Castrol	Honda	27	+19.059	11	7
10	26	(Spain) Dani Pedrosa	Red Bull KTM Factory Racing	KTM	27	+19.389	14	6
11	63	(Italy) Francesco Bagnaia	Ducati Lenovo Team	Ducati	27	+21.667 (Note: 3-second penalty for not completing a long lap penalty.)	2	5
12	23	(Italy) Enea Bastianini	Avintia Esponsorama	Ducati	27	+25.267	20	4
13	46	(Italy) Valentino Rossi	Petronas Yamaha SRT	Yamaha	27	+26.282	17	3
14	10	(Italy) Luca Marini	Sky VR46 Avintia	Ducati	27	+27.492	18	2
15	27	(Spain) Iker Lecuona	Tech3 KTM Factory Racing	KTM	27	+31.076	19	1
16	44	(Spain) Pol Espargaró	Repsol Honda Team	Honda	27	+31.150	15	
17	35	(United Kingdom) Cal Crutchlow	Petronas Yamaha SRT	Yamaha	27	+40.408	23	
18	9	(Italy) Danilo Petrucci	Tech3 KTM Factory Racing	KTM	27	+48.114	22	
NC	12	(Spain) Maverick Viñales	Monster Energy Yamaha MotoGP	Yamaha	27	+1:03.149 (Note: Not classified due to finishing the race through pits.)	9	
Ret	43	(Australia) Jack Miller	Ducati Lenovo Team	Ducati	18	Accident Damage	4	
Ret	88	(Portugal) Miguel Oliveira	Red Bull KTM Factory Racing	KTM	14	Tyre	12	
Ret	41	(Spain) Aleix Espargaró	Aprilia Racing Team Gresini	Aprilia	4	Mechanical	7	
DNS	32	(Italy) Lorenzo Savadori	Aprilia Racing Team Gresini	Aprilia		Did not restart	21	
Fastest lap: (Spain) Joan Mir (Suzuki) – 1:24.209 (lap 7)
Sources:

- Maverick Viñales started from pit lane as he stalled his bike at the start of the formation lap.

=== Moto2 ===
Pos.	No.	Rider	Manufacturer	Laps	Time/Retired	Grid	Points
1	72	(Italy) Marco Bezzecchi	Kalex	25	37:29.460	3	25
2	44	(Spain) Arón Canet	Boscoscuro	25	+1.171	5	20
3	37	(Spain) Augusto Fernández	Kalex	25	+3.260	6	16
4	87	(Australia) Remy Gardner	Kalex	25	+3.856	1	13
5	79	(Japan) Ai Ogura	Kalex	25	+6.922	2	11
6	13	(Italy) Celestino Vietti	Kalex	25	+9.390	19	10
7	25	(Spain) Raúl Fernández	Kalex	25	+9.590	4	9
8	35	(Thailand) Somkiat Chantra	Kalex	25	+12.217	9	8
9	97	(Spain) Xavi Vierge	Kalex	25	+12.747	11	7
10	23	(Germany) Marcel Schrötter	Kalex	25	+12.874	10	6
11	96	(United Kingdom) Jake Dixon	Kalex	25	+13.532	21	5
12	19	(Italy) Lorenzo Dalla Porta	Kalex	25	+14.071	8	4
13	21	(Italy) Fabio Di Giannantonio	Kalex	25	+14.197	12	3
14	22	(United Kingdom) Sam Lowes	Kalex	25	+14.536	7	2
15	75	(Spain) Albert Arenas	Boscoscuro	25	+18.616	15	1
16	12	(Switzerland) Thomas Lüthi	Kalex	25	+19.378	13	
17	14	(Italy) Tony Arbolino	Kalex	25	+19.660	18	
18	62	(Italy) Stefano Manzi	Kalex	25	+22.467	17	
19	42	(Spain) Marcos Ramírez	Kalex	25	+22.762	16	
20	9	(Spain) Jorge Navarro	Boscoscuro	25	+25.267	25	
21	7	(Italy) Lorenzo Baldassarri	MV Agusta	25	+30.121	26	
22	11	(Italy) Nicolò Bulega	Kalex	25	+37.544	23	
23	64	(Netherlands) Bo Bendsneyder	Kalex	25	+38.095	22	
24	5	(Italy) Yari Montella	Boscoscuro	25	+39.007	30	
25	24	(Italy) Simone Corsi	MV Agusta	23	+2 laps	28	
Ret	6	(United States) Cameron Beaubier	Kalex	19	Accident	24	
Ret	40	(Spain) Héctor Garzó	Kalex	17	Accident	14	
Ret	55	(Malaysia) Hafizh Syahrin	NTS	9	Accident	27	
Ret	16	(United States) Joe Roberts	Kalex	9	Accident Damage	20	
Ret	70	(Belgium) Barry Baltus	NTS	1	Accident	29	
OFFICIAL MOTO2 RACE REPORT

=== Moto3 ===
Pos.	No.	Rider	Manufacturer	Laps	Time/Retired	Grid	Points
1	37	(Spain) Pedro Acosta	KTM	23	39:45.869	4	25
2	11	(Spain) Sergio García	Gas Gas	23	+14.431	2	20
3	55	(Italy) Romano Fenati	Husqvarna	23	+15.410	3	16
4	5	(Spain) Jaume Masiá	KTM	23	+15.510	7	13
5	71	(Japan) Ayumu Sasaki	KTM	23	+18.847	14	11
6	40	(South Africa) Darryn Binder	Honda	23	+20.534	8	10
7	6	(Japan) Ryusei Yamanaka	KTM	23	+30.080	19	9
8	92	(Japan) Yuki Kunii	Honda	23	+30.174	20	8
9	73	(Austria) Maximilian Kofler	KTM	23	+30.245	22	7
10	31	(Spain) Adrián Fernández	Husqvarna	23	+36.355	25	6
11	12	(Czech Republic) Filip Salač	KTM	23	+36.437	17	5
12	27	(Japan) Kaito Toba	KTM	23	+36.659	23	4
13	17	(United Kingdom) John McPhee	Honda	23	+36.665	11	3
14	28	(Spain) Izan Guevara	Gas Gas	23	+37.514	5	2
15	24	(Japan) Tatsuki Suzuki	Honda	23	+37.918	13	1
16	20	(France) Lorenzo Fellon	Honda	23	+47.645	21	
17	16	(Italy) Andrea Migno	Honda	23	+52.877	15	
18	52	(Spain) Jeremy Alcoba	Honda	23	+53.006	9	
19	82	(Italy) Stefano Nepa	KTM	23	+55.944	16	
20	2	(Argentina) Gabriel Rodrigo	Honda	23	+1:06.540	10	
21	53	(Turkey) Deniz Öncü	KTM	23	+1:12.291	1	
22	7	(Italy) Dennis Foggia	Honda	23	+1:22.638	6	
23	54	(Italy) Riccardo Rossi	KTM	23	+1:31.488	12	
Ret	38	(Spain) David Salvador	Honda	14	Accident Damage	24	
Ret	19	(Indonesia) Andi Farid Izdihar	Honda	12	Accident	26	
DNS	99	(Spain) Carlos Tatay	KTM		Did not start	18	
DNS	23	(Italy) Niccolò Antonelli	KTM		Did not start		
DNS	43	(Spain) Xavier Artigas	Honda		Did not start		
OFFICIAL MOTO3 RACE REPORT

- Deniz Öncü started at the back of the grid as his mechanics were still working on his bike at the three minute board. His place of the grid was left vacant.
- Carlos Tatay was declared unfit to compete after Sunday warm-up session due to effects of the crash at the Italian Grand Prix. His place of the grid was left vacant.
- Niccolò Antonelli suffered a broken hand in a crash during qualifying and withdrew from the event.
- Xavier Artigas tested positive for COVID-19 on Sunday morning and withdrew from the event.

== Championship standings after the race ==
Below are the standings for the top five riders, constructors, and teams after the round.

=== MotoGP ===
Riders' Championship standings

	Pos.	Rider	Points
	1	(France) Fabio Quartararo	172
	2	(France) Johann Zarco	132
1	3	(Spain) Joan Mir	121
1	4	(Italy) Francesco Bagnaia	114
	5	(Australia) Jack Miller	100

Constructors' Championship standings

Pos.	Constructor	Points
1	(Japan) Yamaha	200
2	(Italy) Ducati	192
3	(Austria) KTM	127
4	(Japan) Suzuki	125
5	(Japan) Honda	97

Teams' Championship standings

	Pos.	Team	Points
	1	(Japan) Monster Energy Yamaha MotoGP	267
	2	(Italy) Ducati Lenovo Team	214
	3	(Italy) Pramac Racing	184
1	4	(Japan) Team Suzuki Ecstar	163
1	5	(Austria) Red Bull KTM Factory Racing	158

=== Moto2 ===
Riders' Championship standings

Pos.	Rider	Points
1	(Australia) Remy Gardner	197
2	(Spain) Raúl Fernández	162
3	(Italy) Marco Bezzecchi	153
4	(United Kingdom) Sam Lowes	101
5	(Italy) Fabio Di Giannantonio	76

Constructors' Championship standings

Pos.	Constructor	Points
1	(Germany) Kalex	250
2	(Italy) Boscoscuro	101
3	(Italy) MV Agusta	10
4	(Japan) NTS	10

Teams' Championship standings

	Pos.	Team	Points
	1	(Finland) Red Bull KTM Ajo	359
	2	(Italy) Sky Racing Team VR46	185
	3	(Belgium) Elf Marc VDS Racing Team	167
	4	(Germany) Liqui Moly Intact GP	102
1	5	(Spain) Aspar Team Moto2	98

=== Moto3 ===
Riders' Championship standings

	Pos.	Rider	Points
	1	(Spain) Pedro Acosta	183
	2	(Spain) Sergio García	130
1	3	(Italy) Romano Fenati	96
1	4	(Italy) Dennis Foggia	86
	5	(Spain) Jaume Masiá	85

Constructors' Championship standings

Pos.	Constructor	Points
1	(Austria) KTM	215
2	(Japan) Honda	188
3	(Spain) Gas Gas	142
4	(Sweden) Husqvarna	100

Teams' Championship standings

	Pos.	Team	Points
	1	(Finland) Red Bull KTM Ajo	268
	2	(Spain) Santander Consumer GasGas	168
2	3	(Malaysia) Petronas Sprinta Racing	119
1	4	(Italy) Indonesian Racing Gresini Moto3	117
1	5	(Luxembourg) Leopard Racing	116

== Notes ==
Previous race: 2021 Dutch TT	FIM Grand Prix World Championship; 2021 season	Next race: 2021 Austrian Grand Prix
Previous race: 2020 Styrian Grand Prix	Styrian motorcycle Grand Prix	Next race: None
