= Deniz Öncü =

Turkish motorcycle racer (born 2003)

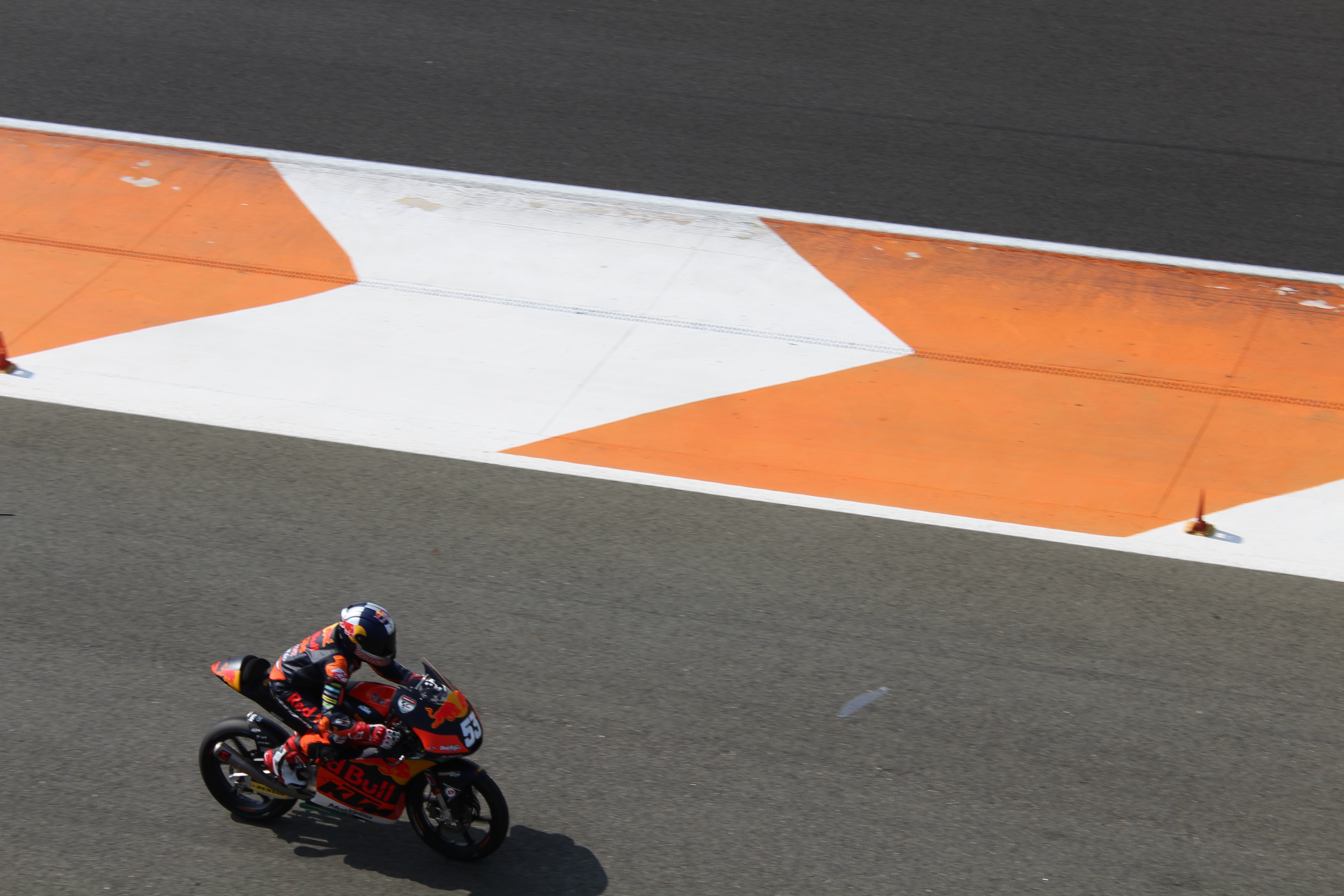
- Nationality: Turkish
- Born: 26 July 2003 (age 23); Alanya, Turkey
- Current team: Elf Marc VDS Racing Team
- Bike number: 53
Motorcycle racing career statistics
Moto2 World Championship
Active years	2024–
Manufacturers	Kalex (2024–2025); Boscoscuro (2026)
Championships	0
2025 championship position	12th (100 pts)
Starts / Wins / Podiums / Poles / F. laps / Points; 48 / 2 / 4 / 0 / 0 / 196.5
Moto3 World Championship
Active years	2019–2023
Manufacturers	KTM
Championships	0
2023 championship position	4th (223 pts)
Starts / Wins / Podiums / Poles / F. laps / Points; 76 / 3 / 13 / 8 / 7 / 568

Deniz Öncü (born 26 July 2003) is a Turkish motorcycle racer competing in the Moto2 World Championship for the Elf Marc VDS Racing Team. His twin brother, Can, is also a motorcycle racer. Both brothers are mentored by Turkish multi-world champion motorcycle racer, Kenan Sofuoğlu.

== Career ==
=== Early career ===
Deniz, and his twin brother Can, competed in the Asia Talent Cup in 2016, Deniz finishing in tenth, and Can in ninth. They would compete again in 2017, Deniz becoming champion, and Can finishing third. They both entered the 2017 Red Bull MotoGP Rookies Cup, with Deniz finishing fourth, and Can in third. Just like with the Asia Talent Cup, they would try again in 2018, Deniz finishing as runner-up this time, behind his brother Can who was crowned champion.

For 2018, as well as competing in the Red Bull Rookies Cup, both Can and Deniz joined Ajo Motorsport, and raced in the 2018 FIM CEV Moto3 Junior World Championship, Deniz finishing in 14th, and Can finishing in seventh with three podiums.

=== Moto3 World Championship ===
==== Red Bull KTM Ajo (2019) ====
In 2019, Deniz made two wildcard race appearances with Red Bull KTM Ajo after reaching the minimum age of 16 for the world championship class, finishing 18th in Germany, and 17th in the Czech Republic. Can had been permitted to race from the start of the season, despite being below the minimum age of 16, as he received a special dispensation by Dorna after winning the 2018 Red Bull MotoGP Rookies Cup, and the 2018 Valencian Grand Prix as a wildcard. Deniz replaced Can for a further three rounds, after Can suffered an injury at the Misano round, finishing in 16th, 24th, and 19th.

==== Red Bull KTM Tech3 (2020–2022) ====
For 2020, Öncü made his full season debut with Red Bull KTM Tech3. He achieved nine point scoring finishes, 50 points total, a season's best result being a sixth place in Valencia, and finished 17th in the riders' championship.

Öncü continued with Tech3 for the 2021 season, and he achieved his first Moto3 podium with a third place finish in Barcelona, followed by two second places in Austria and Aragon. He also scored his first pole position in Austria, but had to start from the back of the grid, because his Tech3 team elected to switch him to slick tyres, and finished just seconds after the three-minute board was shown. After the race in Austin, he was given a two race ban, after being deemed to have caused a massive incident involving clipping Jeremy Alcoba's front wheel, who went tumbling across the track, his bike being struck by Andrea Migno and Pedro Acosta, who both went airborne. All riders involved walked away from the incident unscathed, and Öncü was replaced by Daniel Holgado for the two race ban. Deniz finished the season with three podiums, 11th in the championship standings, and 95 points.

==== Return to Red Bull KTM Ajo (2023) ====
Öncü competed for Red Bull KTM Ajo with teammate José Antonio Rueda in the 2023 season, and he won his first race in the German Grand Prix at the Sachsenring.

=== Moto2 World Championship ===
==== Red Bull KTM Ajo (2024-2025) ====
Red Bull KTM Ajo announced the 2024 Moto2 rider line-up by promoting Öncü from Moto3 to be paired with Celestino Vietti.

Öncü won for the first time in MotorLand Aragon as the first ever Turkish rider to win a Moto2 race by 0.003 seconds against Diogo Moreira in 2025.

==== Marc VDS Racing Team (2026) ====
On 17 September, it was announced that Öncü would join the Marc VDS Racing Team for the upcoming 2026 Moto2 season alongside Arón Canet.

==== Momoven Racing (2027) ====
Öncü will move to RW Racing GP for the 2027 season.

== Career statistics ==
=== Asia Talent Cup ===
==== Races by year ====
(key) (Races in bold indicate pole position; races in italics indicate fastest lap)

Year	Bike	1	2	3	4	5	6	7	8	9	10	11	12	Pos	Pts
2016	Honda	THA1; 11	THA2; 9	QAT1; 12	QAT2; 15	MAL1; Ret	MAL2; 14	CHN1; 6	CHN2; 6	JPN1; Ret	JPN2; 10	SEP1; 5	SEP2; 3	10th	72
2017	Honda	THA1; 1	THA2; 1	QAT1; Ret	QAT2; 5	SUZ1; Ret	SUZ2; 5	MAL1; 6	MAL2; 2	JPN1; 3	JPN2; 3	SEP1; 7	SEP2; 4	1st	156

=== Red Bull MotoGP Rookies Cup ===
==== Races by year ====
(key) (Races in bold indicate pole position, races in italics indicate fastest lap)

Year	1	2	3	4	5	6	7	8	9	10	11	12	13	Pos	Pts
2017	JER1; Ret	JER2; 9	ASS1; 11	ASS2; 5	SAC1; 1	SAC2; Ret	BRN1; 9	BRN2; 1	RBR1; 8	RBR2; 5	MIS; 4	ARA1; 4	ARA2; 6	4th	135
2018	JER1; 4	JER2; 3	MUG; 6	ASS1; 4	ASS2; 5	SAC1; 1	SAC2; 2	RBR1; 4	RBR2; 4	MIS; 8	ARA1; 1	ARA2; 1		2nd	192

=== FIM CEV Moto3 Junior World Championship ===
==== Races by year ====
(key) (Races in bold indicate pole position, races in italics indicate fastest lap)

Year	Bike	1	2	3	4	5	6	7	8	9	10	11	12	Pos	Pts
2018	KTM	EST; 24	VAL1; Ret	VAL2; 14	LMS; 14	CAT1; 9	CAT2; Ret	ARA; 7	JER1; 7	JER2; 6	ALB; 32	VAL1; 24	VAL2; 26	14th	39
2019	KTM	EST; 28	VAL1; Ret	VAL2; Ret	FRA; 8	**CAT1**; Ret	CAT2; 8	ARA; 11	JER1; 13	JER2; 4	ALB; 7	VAL1; Ret	VAL2; Ret	12th	46

=== Grand Prix motorcycle racing ===
==== By season ====
Season	Class	Motorcycle	Team	Race	Win	Podium	Pole	FLap	Pts	Plcd
2019	Moto3	KTM	Red Bull KTM Ajo	5	0	0	0	0	0	35th
2020	Moto3	KTM	Red Bull KTM Tech3	15	0	0	0	0	50	17th
2021	Moto3	KTM	Red Bull KTM Tech3	16	0	3	1	0	95	11th
2022	Moto3	KTM	Red Bull KTM Tech3	20	0	3	3	4	200	5th
2023	Moto3	KTM	Red Bull KTM Ajo	20	3	7	4	3	223	4th
2024	Moto2	Kalex	Red Bull KTM Ajo	17	0	1	0	0	49	20th
2025	Moto2	Kalex	Red Bull KTM Ajo	12	2	3	0	0	100	12th
2026	Moto2	Boscoscuro	Elf Marc VDS Racing Team	19	0	0	0	0	47.5*	17th*
Total				**124**	**5**	**17**	**8**	**7**	**764.5**	

==== By class ====
Class	Seasons	1st GP	1st pod	1st win	Race	Win	Podiums	Pole	FLap	Pts	WChmp
Moto3	2019–2023	2019 Czech Republic	2021 Catalunya	2023 Germany	76	3	13	8	7	568	0
Moto2	2024–present	2024 Qatar	2024 Aragón	2025 Aragón	48	2	4	0	0	196.5	0
Total	2019–present				**124**	**5**	**17**	**8**	**7**	**764.5**	**0**

==== Races by year ====
(key) (Races in bold indicate pole position; races in italics indicate fastest lap)

Year	Class	Bike	1	2	3	4	5	6	7	8	9	10	11	12	13	14	15	16	17	18	19	20	21	22	Pos	Pts
2019	Moto3	KTM	QAT	ARG	AME	SPA	FRA	ITA	CAT	NED	GER	CZE; 18	AUT; 17	GBR	RSM; 16	ARA; 24	THA; 19	JPN	AUS	MAL	VAL				35th	0
2020	Moto3	KTM	QAT; 12	SPA; 25	ANC; Ret	CZE; 15	AUT; 8	STY; Ret	RSM; 16	EMI; 7	CAT; Ret	FRA; 22	ARA; 15	TER; 7	EUR; 14	VAL; 6	POR; 10								17th	50
2021	Moto3	KTM	QAT; 20	DOH; 18	POR; 15	SPA; 20	FRA; 9	ITA; Ret	CAT; 3	GER; 16	NED; 15	**STY**; 21	AUT; 2	GBR; 8	ARA; 2	RSM; 21	AME; 5	EMI	ALR	VAL; 5					11th	95
2022	Moto3	KTM	QAT; 4	INA; 5	ARG; 14	AME; 5	**POR**; 4	SPA; 4	FRA; 9	**ITA**; 15	CAT; 5	GER; 7	NED; 9	GBR; 3	AUT; 4	**RSM**; 4	ARA; 4	JPN; 15	THA; 17	AUS; 2	MAL; 10	VAL; 2			5th	200
2023	Moto3	KTM	POR; 10	ARG; 24	AME; 6	**SPA**; 9	FRA; 6	**ITA**; 2	GER; 1	NED; 3	GBR; 11	AUT; 1	**CAT**; 11	RSM; 3	IND; 14	JPN; Ret	INA; 8	AUS; 1	**THA**; 5	MAL; 11	QAT; 3	VAL; 5			4th	223
2024	Moto2	Kalex	QAT; 15	POR; 20	AME; 22	SPA; 14	FRA; 18	CAT; 19	ITA; 13	NED	GER	GBR	AUT; 11	ARA; 3	RSM; 19	EMI; Ret	INA; 9	JPN; 17	AUS; 21	THA; 10	MAL; 7	SLD; 21			20th	49
2025	Moto2	Kalex	THA; 12	ARG; 14	AME; Ret	QAT; 2	SPA; 5	FRA; 17	GBR; 19	ARA; 1	ITA; 6	NED; Ret	GER; 1	CZE; 13	AUT	HUN	CAT	RSM	JPN	INA	AUS	MAL	POR	VAL	12th	100
2026	Moto2	Boscoscuro	THA; 9^{‡}	BRA; 20	USA; 20	SPA; 13	FRA; 13	CAT; 22	ITA; 10	HUN; 17	CZE; 18	NED; Ret	GER; 17	GBR; 8	ARA; 8	RSM; 20	AUT; 9	JPN; 7	INA; 22	AUS; C	MAL; Ret	QAT; 21	POR	VAL	17th*	47.5*

^{‡} Half points awarded as less than half of the race distance (but at least three full laps) was completed.
* Season still in progress.
