= Fabio Quartararo =

French motorcycle racer (born 1999)

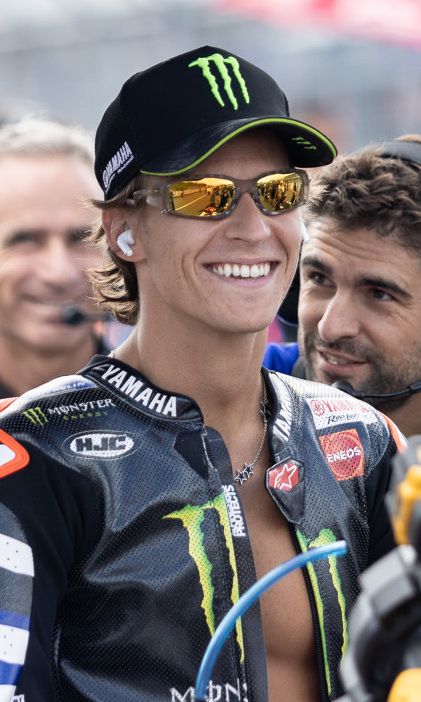
- Quartararo at the 2026 German Grand Prix
- Nationality: French
- Born: 20 April 1999 (age 27); Nice, France
- Current team: Monster Energy Yamaha MotoGP Team
- Bike number: 20
- Website: FabioQuartararo.fr
Motorcycle racing career statistics
MotoGP World Championship
Active years	2019–
Manufacturers	Yamaha
Championships	1 (2021)
2025 championship position	9th (201 pts)
Starts / Wins / Podiums / Poles / F. laps / Points; 151 / 11 / 32 / 21 / 13 / 1410
Moto2 World Championship
Active years	2017–2018
Manufacturers	Kalex (2017); Speed Up (2018)
Championships	0
2018 championship position	10th (138 pts)
Starts / Wins / Podiums / Poles / F. laps / Points; 35 / 1 / 2 / 1 / 1 / 202
Moto3 World Championship
Active years	2015–2016
Manufacturers	Honda (2015); KTM (2016)
Championships	0
2016 championship position	13th (83 pts)
Starts / Wins / Podiums / Poles / F. laps / Points; 31 / 0 / 2 / 2 / 0 / 175

Fabio Alain Quartararo (pronounced [kwartaˈraːro]; born 20 April 1999), nicknamed El Diablo, is a French Grand Prix motorcycle rider racing in MotoGP for Monster Energy Yamaha MotoGP Team. Having won the 2021 MotoGP World Championship, he is the first French World Champion in the premier class' history.

Prior to his Grand Prix career, Quartararo won six Spanish junior championship titles, including successive CEV Moto3 titles in 2013 and 2014. Due to his successes at a young age, he has been tipped for "big things", even being compared to multiple time world champion Marc Márquez, and set various age records during his progress up to World Championship level. He failed to meet the high expectations in the Moto3 and Moto2 World Championships, but made the move up to MotoGP with Petronas Yamaha SRT, and finished as rookie of the year in 2019 with seven podiums and fifth place in the overall standings. After collecting three victories in the compressed 2020 season, Quartararo moved up to the Yamaha Factory Racing Team for 2021 replacing Valentino Rossi, and won the championship in his first season collecting five victories and ten podiums. Quartararo is due to leave Yamaha at the end of the 2026 to join Honda.

== Biography ==
Fabio Quartararo was born in Nice, France, to a family of Sicilian origin. His father, Étienne, was a motorcycle racer who had won the 1983 French 125cc Championship and raced in the 250cc class of the 1986 French motorcycle Grand Prix. On 14 July 2022, he was awarded a Knight of the Legion of Honour.

== Career ==
=== Early career ===
Born in Nice, Quartararo started his career in his native France at the age of four. He later moved to Spain to compete in the Promovelocidad Cup, a series for young riders organised by the Real Automóvil Club de Cataluña (RACC). He won championship titles in the series' 50cc class in 2008, the 70cc class in 2009, and the 80cc class in 2011. Prior to moving into the senior Moto3 series in Spain, Quartararo won the Mediterranean pre-Moto3 class in 2012, which was also denoted as the Spanish domestic championship.

=== CEV Repsol career ===
Moving into the Moto3 class of the CEV Repsol series in 2013, Quartararo joined Wild Wolf Racing – run by former Grand Prix racer Juan Borja – riding a Honda. Quartararo finished on the podium in his maiden race in the series, run in wet conditions, finishing second to Great Britain's Wayne Ryan at Circuit de Barcelona-Catalunya. Quartararo finished sixth in the second race at the circuit, and left tied for the championship lead with Dutch rider Bryan Schouten. Over the next four races, Quartararo recorded one top-ten finish from pole position at Navarra, and had dropped to eighth in the riders' championship standings, 37 points behind Spain's Marcos Ramírez. Quartararo finished the season winning each of the final three races from pole position – his first series wins – defeating Ramírez by almost ten seconds in the final race at Jerez. As a result, Quartararo became the first non-Spanish rider since Stefan Bradl in 2007 to take the title, and at the age of 14 years, 218 days, its youngest series champion, surpassing the previous record held by Aleix Espargaró.

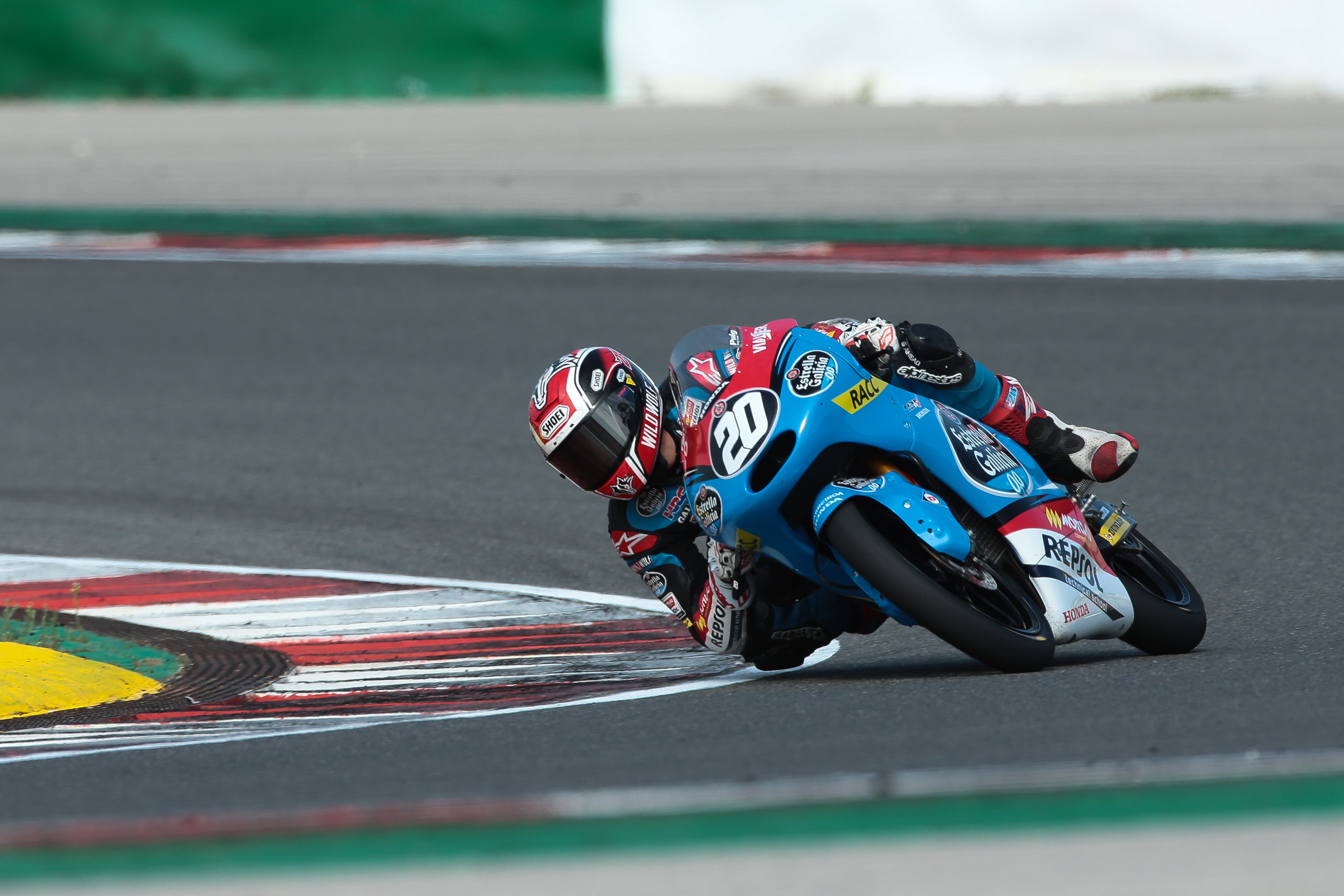
Quartararo in 2014

Quartararo remained in the CEV Repsol championship for the 2014 season, as he was not old enough to graduate to the World Championship level. The rule, announced in 2008 and introduced in 2010, stated that a rider must be 16 years of age to compete in a Grand Prix. Quartararo continued riding a Honda in the series, but moved to the Estrella Galicia 0,0 junior team run by Emilio Alzamora, the 1999 125cc world champion. Quartararo finished the season as a champion, winning nine of the season's eleven races, and finishing second to María Herrera at Jerez and Jorge Navarro at Albacete in the other two. His eventual championship-winning margin was 127 points over Navarro, who joined him as his team-mate at the final round of the season in Valencia. At that final round, Quartararo also beat World Championship competitors Alexis Masbou and John McPhee, with their SaxoPrint-RTG team making a one-off appearance in the championship.

Quartararo's performances in the Spanish series were noted at World Championship level. In the race which supported the 2014 French Grand Prix at Le Mans, Quartararo won by almost four seconds over nine laps, leading almost the entire race having started from second on the grid. In August 2014, the Grand Prix Commission, consisting of representatives from Dorna Sports, the Fédération Internationale de Motocyclisme (FIM), the International Road-Racing Teams Association (IRTA) and the Motorcycle Sports Manufacturers' Association (MSMA), announced a change to the previously introduced age eligibility rules, allowing for the champion of the FIM CEV Moto3 championship to compete in the succeeding season of the Moto3 World Championship regardless of age.

=== Moto3 World Championship ===
==== Estrella Galicia 0,0 (2015) ====
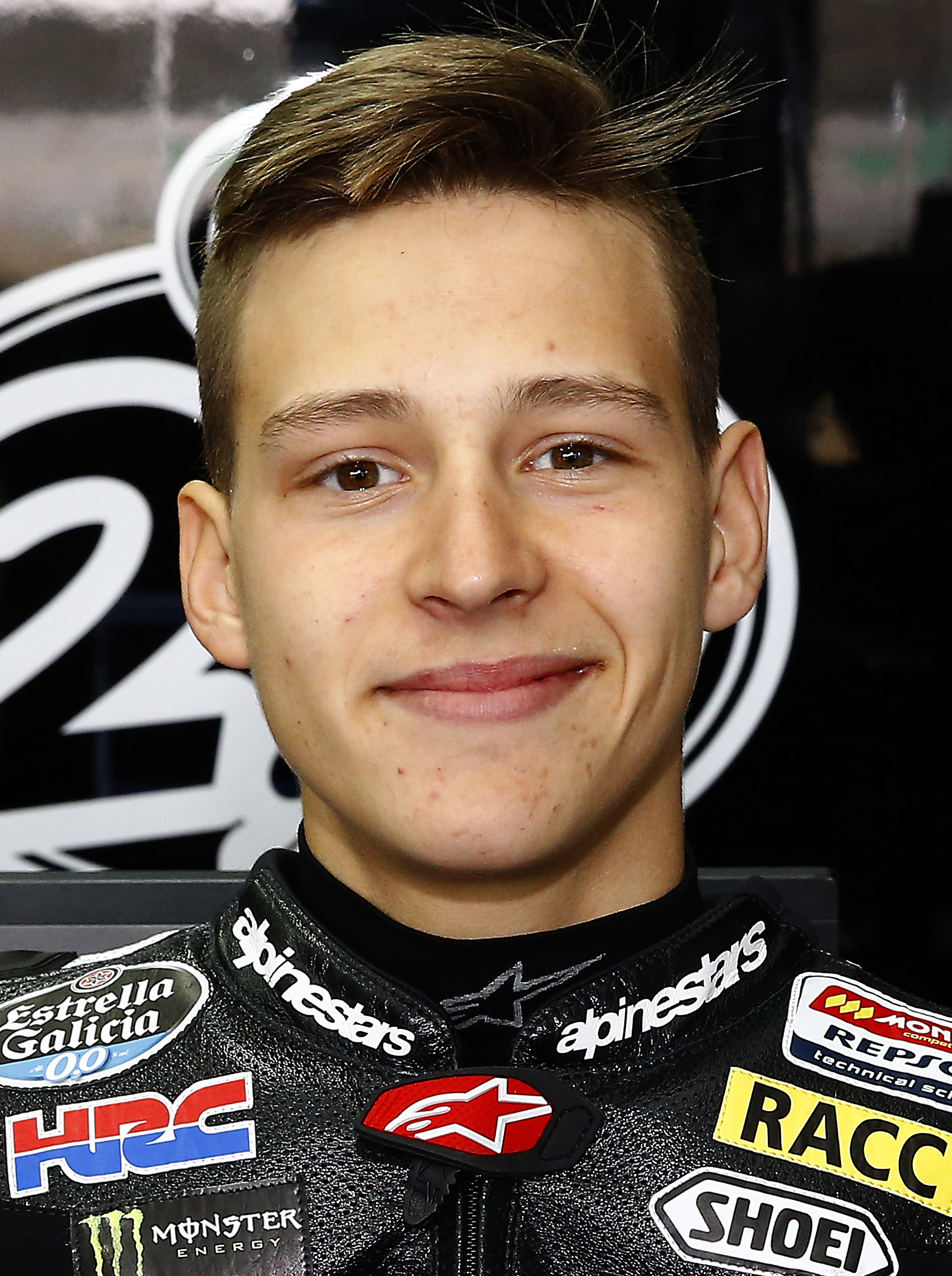
Quartararo in 2015

Quartararo was announced to be joining the Moto3 World Championship in October 2014, with the publication of the championship's initial entry list. He remained with the Estrella Galicia 0,0 outfit, again riding a Honda, that he won that season's Spanish title with, and he was joined by Jorge Navarro, his closest rival in those championship standings. He tested the team's Moto3 motorcycle for the first time in post-season testing in Valencia, but his first lap times were not provided due to the fact that he tested without a transponder. During the first day of official pre-season tests at Valencia in 2015, Quartararo set the fastest time in the third session. At the following three-day test at Jerez, Quartararo was fastest in five of nine sessions, including a clean sweep on the final day.

At his opening race weekend in Qatar, Quartararo qualified on the second row of the grid in sixth position, 0.123 seconds away from the pole-setting time recorded by countryman Alexis Masbou. In the race, Quartararo held the lead of the race with two laps to go, but contact with Francesco Bagnaia saw him ultimately finishing the race in seventh position and 0.772 seconds behind the race winner, Masbou. At the following event in Austin, Texas, Quartararo achieved his first podium finish, with a second-place finish behind Danny Kent. He achieved his first pole position at the Spanish Grand Prix, a tenth of a second clear of Kent, but finished the race in fourth place. On his home race at Le Mans, Quartararo again took pole position, by just over a tenth of a second from team-mate Navarro. He led for a period during the race, but high-sided out of it from fourth position.

Quartararo returned to the podium with a second-place finish at Assen, having been part of the lead group for the entire race; he finished 0.066 seconds behind race winner Miguel Oliveira. In the next four races, Quartararo alternated retirements with finishes of eleventh at Indianapolis and fourth at Silverstone. At Misano, Quartararo crashed during the second free practice session, fracturing his right ankle and missing the race as a result of the injury. Quartararo also missed the following race in Aragon, where he was replaced by the team's CEV Moto3 rider Sena Yamada. Quartararo returned for the Japanese Grand Prix, but withdrew from the race after qualifying 29th on the grid, due to continued pain. Quartararo also pulled out of the Australian Grand Prix, after qualifying 19th on the grid. Quartararo ultimately finished the season in tenth place, with ninety-two points.

==== Leopard Racing (2016) ====
On 26 September 2015, it was announced that Quartararo would leave the Estrella Galicia 0,0 team to join Leopard Racing on a two-year contract from the 2016 season. Quartararo was considered as the title favorite for the season because of his performance in his rookie year and the Leopard Racing team, which won the previous year's title with Danny Kent.

In the first three races, Quartararo finished in thirteenth place, followed by a crash in Spain. He finished sixth at his home race at Le Mans. He had pointless finishes in six races, and his best result was a fourth-place finish at Austria.

=== Moto2 World Championship ===
==== Pons Racing (2017) ====
Quartararo changed from Moto3 to Moto2 in 2017 to the Pons Racing as a teammate of Edgar Pons. On his debut, Quartararo finished seventh in Qatar. His only better result of the season was sixth place in San Marino. He finished the season with 64 points in 13th place of the championship.

==== Speed Up Racing (2018) ====
For 2018, Quartararo switched to the Speed Up Racing team. He achieved his first-ever Grand Prix victory in Catalunya. Despite success in the following race with a second place in Assen, he achieved no further podiums and finished with 138 points in tenth place of the championship.

=== MotoGP World Championship ===
==== Petronas Yamaha SRT (2019–2020) ====
===== 2019 =====
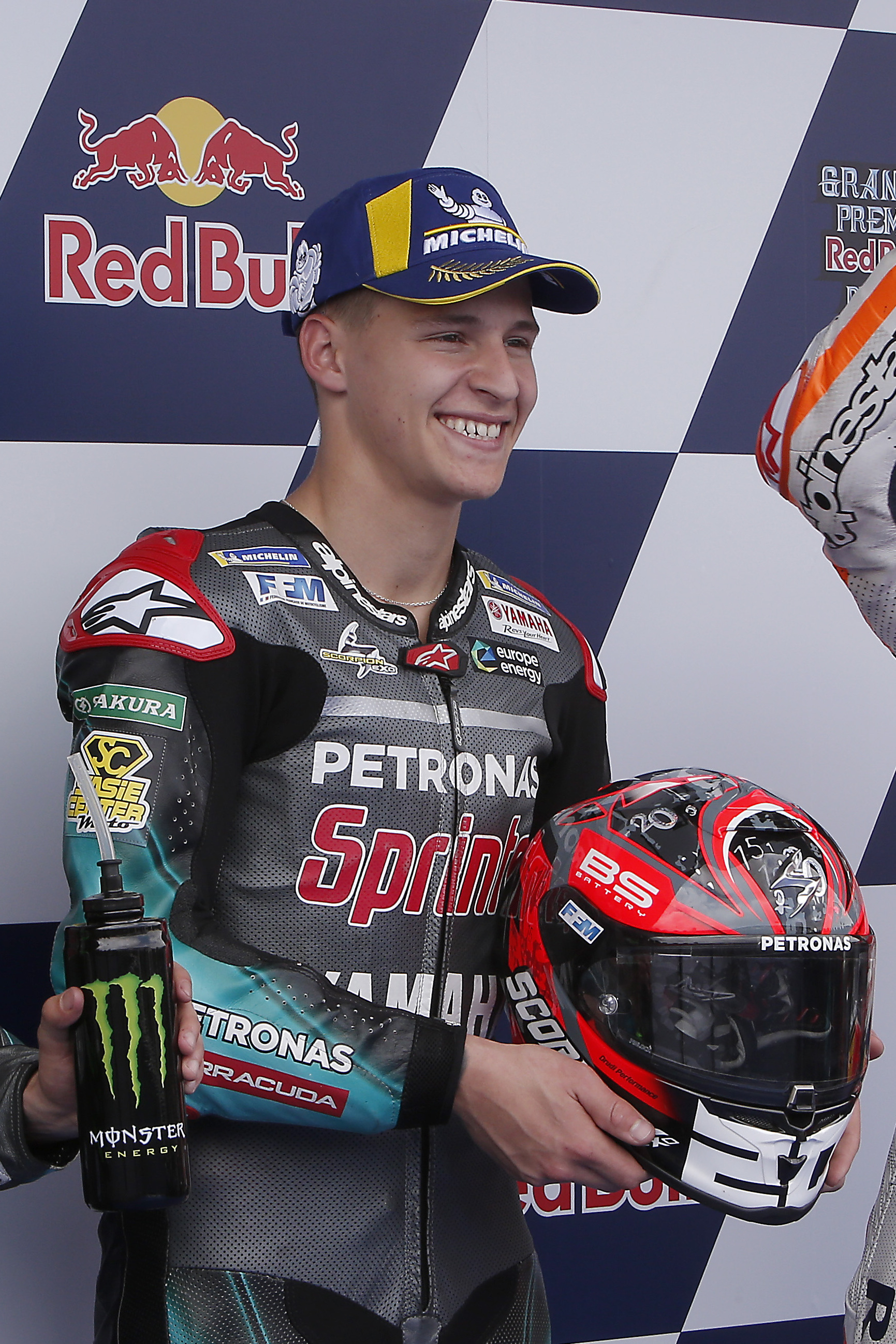
Quartararo at the 2019 Spanish Grand Prix

In August 2018, it was announced that Quartararo would join Franco Morbidelli at the newly created Yamaha satellite team, Petronas Yamaha SRT, in 2019. He would be intended to riding with a 2018-spec Yamaha. However, Yamaha gave him a factory-spec Yamaha, known as the "Spec-B".

Quartararo qualified on pole position for the Spanish Grand Prix. With this pole position, he took the record for youngest ever polesitter in the MotoGP class, a record previously held by Marc Márquez since 2013. He also qualified on pole position in Catalunya, ultimately finishing the race in second place, and the following race in Assen, setting a new lap record and becoming the youngest rider with consecutive pole positions in MotoGP history. He finished third in Assen, behind Maverick Viñales and Marc Márquez. The next race at the Sachsenring, he qualified second, behind Marc Márquez. During the second lap of the race, Quartararo slumped in the third corner while sitting on the inside with Danilo Petrucci and ended up in the gravel.

Quartararo achieved further podium finishes on the season with a third place in Austria and four second-place finishes in San Marino, Thailand, Japan, and Valencia. He started from pole position in Thailand, Malaysia, and Valencia. He ultimately finished the season in fifth place of the riders' standings with 192 points, seven podiums, and six pole positions.

===== 2020 =====
At the first race of the delayed 2020 season in Jerez, Quartararo qualified on pole position and went on to take his maiden victory in the premier class after briefly dropping to fifth place on the opening lap. At the second round of the Jerez double-header, He repeated the statistic by qualifying on pole and winning the race, this time leading from the outset and building a lead of over eight seconds by the 20th lap before finishing 4.5 seconds ahead of Maverick Viñales.

Quartararo achieved his third win at the Catalunya round to retake the championship lead. At the first Aragon round, he suffered an injured hip after an FP3 highside crash, but was cleared by medical staff to take part in qualifying, where he went on to take pole position. Lingering pain and struggles with the front tire in the track conditions caused him to drop down the back, ultimately finishing in 18th place, his first non-retirement finish outside of the points in MotoGP since his first-ever race in Qatar.

==== Yamaha MotoGP (2021–2026) ====
===== 2021 =====
After a rookie season in MotoGP, Yamaha Factory Racing announced on 29 January 2020 that Quartararo would replace Valentino Rossi beginning with the 2021 season, and that he would receive factory-supported machinery for his remaining season at Petronas Yamaha SRT.

Quartararo started the season at Losail with a fifth place and a win in two consecutive weekends. Two weeks later in Portimao, he qualified for the pole position after Francesco Bagnaia's lap was invalidated, and led the race for the last 17 of 25 laps for his second win of the season. Quartararo took pole again in Jerez and was leading the race, but started to suffer arm pump problems halfway through and fell back the order, finishing the race in 13th while Jack Miller took the win. After a successful surgery, he qualified in pole position in Le Mans, his third consecutive pole. During the race, due to unexpected weather changes and rain starting to come down, he switched bikes along with other riders, but was penalised with a long lap penalty when he pulled into Maverick Viñales's garage instead of his own. Despite the penalty, he finished his home GP in third, with fellow countryman Johann Zarco taking second, and Jack Miller first.

Quartararo took pole position for a fourth consecutive time at the Italian Grand Prix in Mugello, but the weekend was overshadowed by the passing of Moto3 rider Jason Dupasquier, who died after an accident in pre-race qualifying. Quartararo won the race, achieving his third win of the season and dedicated both the pole and win to Dupasquier.

In Catalunya, he took pole position for a fifth consecutive time, doing so for the first time in premier class history since Marc Márquez in 2014. He finished in third but was demoted to fourth after being given a three-second penalty for taking a shortcut, and was then given another three-second penalty post-race for riding with his leather suit open. The zipper was down and Quartararo removed his chest protector, breaching race rules requiring protective equipment to be worn correctly at all times, thus demoting him to 6th place. He extended his championship lead with a third place at the Sachsenring, a win at Assen, and a third place in Spielberg.

Quartararo won his fifth race of the season in Silverstone, and with two second-place finishes in Rimini, and Austin, he had a 52-point gap to Francesco Bagnaia with three races to go. Bagnaia led with five laps to go in Misano, but crashed out, ending his title fight confirming Quartararo won the title with two full races to go.

===== 2022 =====
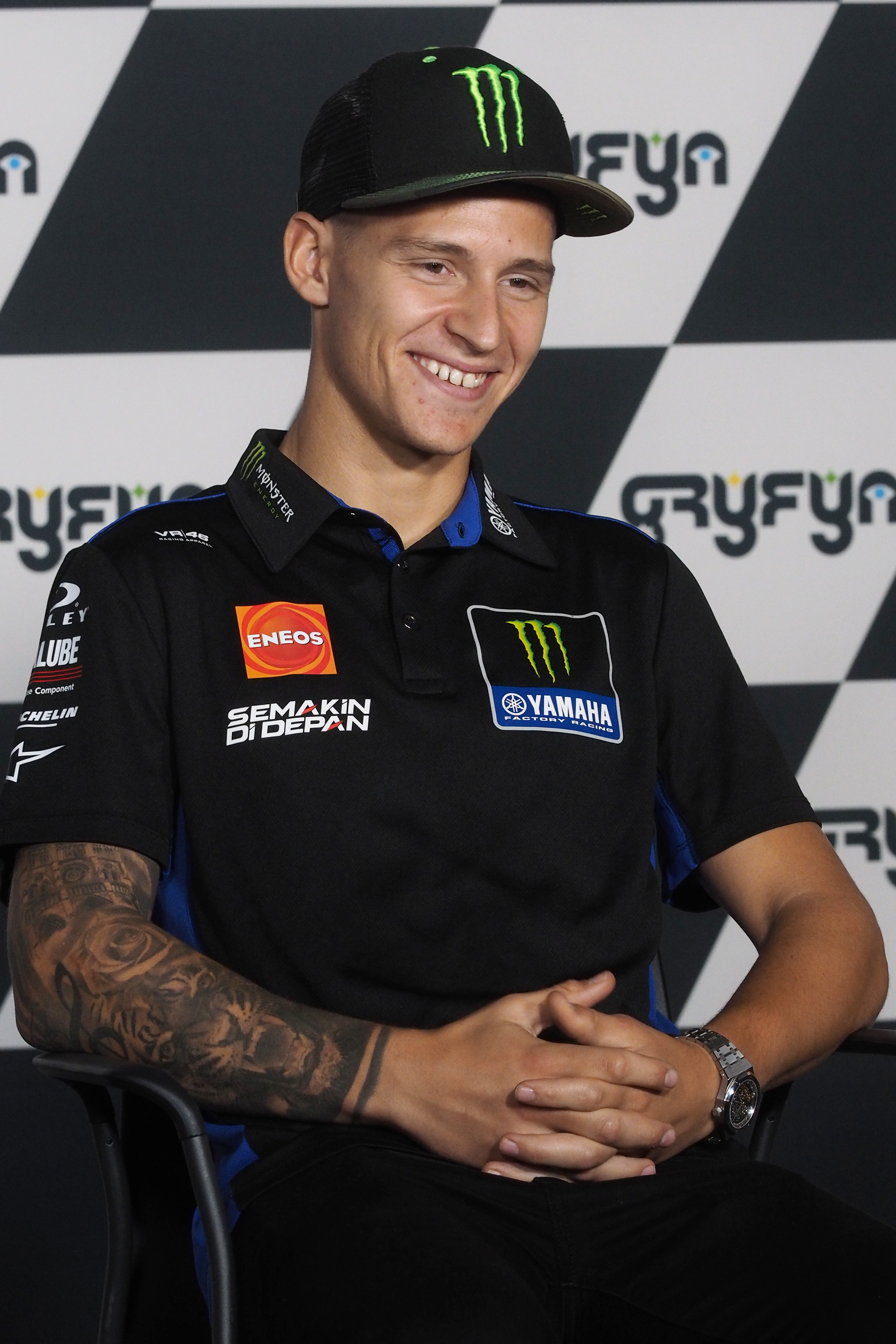
Quartararo at the 2022 San Marino Grand Prix

At the start of the season, Quartararo struggled with his bike, with a ninth-place finish at the opening round. He set his only pole position time of the season in Mandalika, 0.2 seconds ahead of Jorge Martín. He won three races before the summer break, including the Portugal, Catalan, and German Grands Prix. By the end of the season, he finished with 248 points, eight podiums, and three DNFs. Quartararo finished in second place in the final standings behind Francesco Bagnaia, after a championship battle which saw the latter overcome a 91-point lead held by Quartararo after the German Grand Prix.

===== 2023 =====
On 2 June 2022, Quartararo signed a contract extension with the team for 2023 and 2024. He took his first podium of the season at the Grand Prix of the Americas. He took two more podiums for the rest of the season in India and Indonesia. He ended the season ahead of teammate Morbidelli, and tenth in the rider standings.

===== 2024 =====
Quartararo started the season with an 11th place at the Qatar Grand Prix. In the following Grand Prix in Portugal, he finished ninth in the sprint race and seven in the main race. In USA, he finished the main race at the 12th place. At the 2024 German GP, he finished the race in 11th, on a track traditionally suited to Quartararo's strengths. During a season marked by Yamaha's consistent struggles, Quartararo ended the season in 13th and without a podium finish, the first season during his MotoGP career which this had occurred.

===== 2025 =====
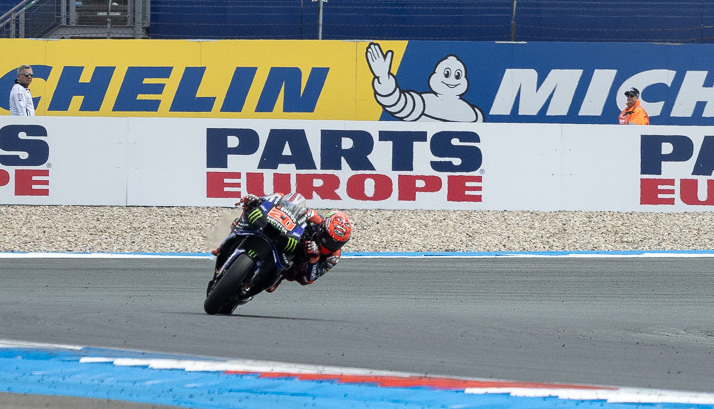
Quartararo during the 2025 Dutch TT

On 5 April 2024, Quartararo signed a contract extension with the team for 2025 and 2026. He achieved pole position at the Spanish Grand Prix and finished second, his first podium since the 2023 Indonesian GP. This was followed by another two successive pole positions at the French Grand Prix and British Grand Prix. Quartararo crashed out of the feature race at the French Grand Prix amidst wet weather, and did not finish the British Grand Prix due to a ride height device failure. He failed to finish the race at Aragon for a third successive time, the first time that this occurred during Quartararo's premier class career.

===== 2026 =====
In June 2026, Quartararo announced his departure from Yamaha at the end of the 2026 season, bringing an end to a six-year stint with the factory outfit.

==== Honda HRC Castrol (2027–) ====
In July 2026, Honda Racing Corporation announced that Quartararo would join its factory MotoGP team on a two-year contract covering the 2027 and 2028 seasons.

== Personal life ==
Quartararo currently resides in Andorra.

== Career statistics ==
=== Pre-Grand Prix career highlights ===
- 2007: 2nd, FCM Copa Catalana de Promovelocitat (Promo RACC) Spanish 50cc Championship
- 2008: 1st, FCM Copa Catalana de Promovelocitat (Promo RACC) Spanish 50cc Championship
- 2009: 1st, FCM Copa Catalana de Promovelocitat (Promo RACC) Spanish 70cc Championship
- 2010: 3rd, FCM Campeonato del Mediterraneo Velocidad (CMV) Mediterranean/N.Spanish 80cc Championship
- 2011: 1st, FCM/RACC Campeonat del Mediterrani de Velocitat (CMV) Mediterranean/N. Spanish 80cc Championship
- 2012: 1st, FCM/RACC Campeonat del Mediterrani de Velocitat (CMV) Mediterranean/N. Spanish Pre-Moto3 Championship

=== FIM CEV Moto3 Junior World Championship ===
==== Races by year ====
(key) (Races in bold indicate pole position; races in italics indicate fastest lap)

Year	Bike	1	2	3	4	5	6	7	8	9	10	11	Pos	Pts
2013	FTR Honda	CAT1; 2	CAT2; 6	ARA; 12	ALB1; EX	ALB2; Ret	**NAV**; 10	**VAL1**; 1	**VAL1**; 1	**JER**; 1			1st	115
2014	Honda	**JER1**; 1	**JER2**; 2	LMS; 1	**ARA**; 1	**CAT1**; 1	**CAT2**; 1	**ALB**; 2	**NAV**; 1	**ALG**; 1	VAL1; 1	VAL1; 1	1st	265

=== Grand Prix motorcycle racing ===
==== By season ====
Season	Class	Motorcycle	Team	Race	Win	Podium	Pole	FLap	Pts	Plcd	WCh
2015	Moto3	Honda	Estrella Galicia 0,0	13	0	2	2	0	92	10th	–
2016	Moto3	KTM	Leopard Racing	18	0	0	0	0	83	13th	–
2017	Moto2	Kalex	Pons HP40	18	0	0	0	0	64	13th	–
2018	Moto2	Speed Up	Speed Up Racing	18	1	2	1	1	138	10th	–
2019	MotoGP	Yamaha	Petronas Yamaha SRT	19	0	7	6	2	192	5th	–
2020	MotoGP	Yamaha	Petronas Yamaha SRT	14	3	3	4	2	127	8th	–
2021	MotoGP	Yamaha	Monster Energy Yamaha MotoGP	18	5	10	5	5	278	**1st**	1
2022	MotoGP	Yamaha	Monster Energy Yamaha MotoGP	20	3	8	1	4	248	**2nd**	–
2023	MotoGP	Yamaha	Monster Energy Yamaha MotoGP	20	0	3	0	0	172	10th	–
2024	MotoGP	Yamaha	Monster Energy Yamaha MotoGP Team	20	0	0	0	0	113	13th	–
2025	MotoGP	Yamaha	Monster Energy Yamaha MotoGP Team	22	0	1	5	0	201	9th	–
2026	MotoGP	Yamaha	Monster Energy Yamaha MotoGP Team	18	0	0	0	0	79*	14th*	–
Total				**218**	**12**	**36**	**24**	**14**	**1787**		**1**

*Season ongoing.

==== By class ====
Class	Seasons	1st GP	1st pod	1st win	Race	Win	Podiums	Pole	FLap	Pts	WChmp
Moto3	2015–2016	2015 Qatar	2015 Americas		31	0	2	2	0	175	0
Moto2	2017–2018	2017 Qatar	2018 Catalunya	2018 Catalunya	36	1	2	1	1	202	0
MotoGP	2019–present	2019 Qatar	2019 Catalunya	2020 Spain	151	11	32	21	13	1410	1
Total	2015–present				**218**	**12**	**36**	**24**	**14**	**1787**	**1**

==== Races by year ====
(key) (Races in bold indicate pole position; races in italics indicate fastest lap; ^{superscript} indicates point-scoring sprint position)

Year	Class	Bike	1	2	3	4	5	6	7	8	9	10	11	12	13	14	15	16	17	18	19	20	21	22	Pos	Pts
2015	Moto3	Honda	QAT; 7	AME; 2	ARG; 6	**SPA**; 4	**FRA**; Ret	ITA; Ret	CAT; 14	NED; 2	GER; Ret	INP; 11	CZE; Ret	GBR; 4	RSM; DNS	ARA	JPN; DNS	AUS; DNS	MAL	VAL; Ret					10th	92
2016	Moto3	KTM	QAT; 13	ARG; 13	AME; 13	SPA; Ret	FRA; 6	ITA; 5	CAT; 7	NED; Ret	GER; 23	AUT; 4	CZE; 21	GBR; Ret	RSM; 18	ARA; 12	JPN; 8	AUS; 12	MAL; 4	VAL; 14					13th	83
2017	Moto2	Kalex	QAT; 7	ARG; Ret	AME; 12	SPA; 16	FRA; 18	ITA; 18	CAT; 7	NED; 9	GER; 13	CZE; 20	AUT; Ret	GBR; 16	RSM; 6	ARA; 11	JPN; 19	AUS; Ret	MAL; 7	VAL; 8					13th	64
2018	Moto2	Speed Up	QAT; 20	ARG; 22	AME; 15	SPA; 10	FRA; 8	ITA; 11	**CAT**; 1	NED; 2	GER; 9	CZE; 11	AUT; 9	GBR; C	RSM; 7	ARA; 9	THA; 5	JPN; DSQ	AUS; 10	MAL; 5	VAL; 6				10th	138
2019	MotoGP	Yamaha	QAT; 16	ARG; 8	AME; 7	**SPA**; Ret	FRA; 8	ITA; 10	**CAT**; 2	**NED**; 3	GER; Ret	CZE; 7	AUT; 3	GBR; Ret	RSM; 2	ARA; 5	**THA**; 2	JPN; 2	AUS; Ret	**MAL**; 7	**VAL**; 2				5th	192
2020	MotoGP	Yamaha	**SPA**; 1	**ANC**; 1	CZE; 7	AUT; 8	STY; 13	RSM; Ret	EMI; 4	CAT; 1	**FRA**; 9	**ARA**; 18	TER; 8	EUR; 14	VAL; Ret	POR; 14									8th	127
2021	MotoGP	Yamaha	QAT; 5	DOH; 1	**POR**; 1	**SPA**; 13	**FRA**; 3	**ITA**; 1	**CAT**; 6	GER; 3	NED; 1	STY; 3	AUT; 7	GBR; 1	ARA; 8	RSM; 2	AME; 2	EMI; 4	ALR; Ret	VAL; 5					1st	278
2022	MotoGP	Yamaha	QAT; 9	**INA**; 2	ARG; 8	AME; 7	POR; 1	SPA; 2	FRA; 4	ITA; 2	CAT; 1	GER; 1	NED; Ret	GBR; 8	AUT; 2	RSM; 5	ARA; Ret	JPN; 8	THA; 17	AUS; Ret	MAL; 3	VAL; 4			2nd	248
2023	MotoGP	Yamaha	POR; 8	ARG; 7^{9}	AME; 3	SPA; 10	FRA; 7	ITA; 11	GER; 13	NED; Ret^{3}	GBR; 15	AUT; 8	CAT; 7	RSM; 13	IND; 3^{6}	JPN; 10	INA; 3^{5}	AUS; 14	THA; 5	MAL; 5	QAT; 7^{8}	VAL; 11			10th	172
2024	MotoGP	Yamaha	QAT; 11	POR; 7^{9}	AME; 12	SPA; 15^{5}	FRA; Ret	CAT; 9	ITA; 18	NED; 12^{7}	GER; 11	GBR; 11	AUT; 18	ARA; Ret^{8}	RSM; 7^{9}	EMI; 7^{7}	INA; 7	JPN; 12	AUS; 9	THA; 16	MAL; 6^{5}	SLD; 11			13th	113
2025	MotoGP	Yamaha	THA; 15^{7}	ARG; 14	AME; 10^{6}	QAT; 7^{5}	**SPA**; 2	**FRA**; Ret^{4}	**GBR**; Ret^{7}	ARA; Ret	ITA; 14	**NED**; 10	GER; 4^{3}	CZE; 6^{5}	AUT; 15	HUN; 10	CAT; 5^{2}	RSM; 8	JPN; 8^{6}	INA; 7	**AUS**; 11^{7}	MAL; 5^{5}	POR; 6^{4}	VAL; Ret^{7}	9th	201
2026	MotoGP	Yamaha	THA; 14	BRA; 16^{6}	USA; 17	SPA; 14^{7}	FRA; 6^{5}	CAT; 5	ITA; 18	HUN; Ret	CZE; Ret	NED; 8	GER; 7	GBR; 16	ARA; 18	RSM; 10	AUT; 17	JPN; 12	INA; 9	AUS; C	MAL; 11	QAT; DNA	POR	VAL	14th*	79*

* Season still in progress.

Sporting positions
Preceded by Álex Márquez	CEV Repsol Moto3; Champion; 2013–2014	Succeeded by Nicolò Bulega
