= Ryusei Yamanaka =

Japanese motorcycle racer

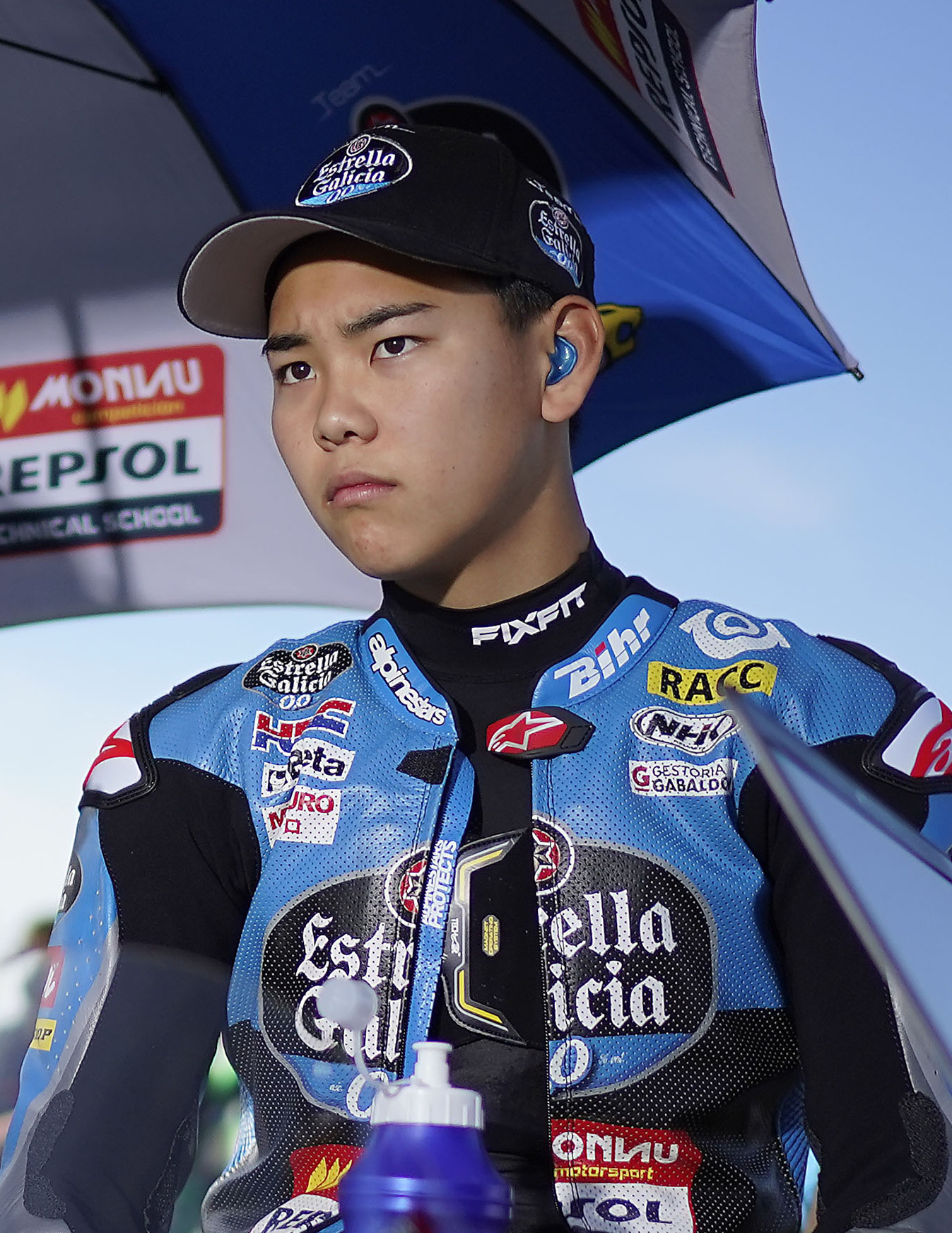
- Yamanaka in 2020
- Nationality: Japanese
- Born: 6 November 2001 (age 25); Yotsukaidō, Chiba, Japan
- Current team: Aeon Credit – MT Helmets – MSi
- Bike number: 6
Motorcycle racing career statistics
Moto3 World Championship
Active years	2019–
Manufacturers	Honda (2019–2020); KTM (2021–2022, 2024–); Gas Gas (2023)
2025 championship position	9th (136 pts)
Starts / Wins / Podiums / Poles / F. laps / Points; 134 / 0 / 3 / 1 / 3 / 567

Ryusei Yamanaka (山中 琉聖, Yamanaka Ryūsei; born 6 November 2001) is a Japanese motorcycle racer who competes in the 2026 Moto3 World Championship with MT Helmets – MSi.

== Career statistics ==
=== Career highlights ===
- 2008: 1st, Japan Life Pocket Bike Championship
- 2009: 1st, Life Poket bike Championship Novice Class / 1st, All Japan Pocket Bike Open Class Championship
- 2010: 1st, Mobara Motowest GP Championship
- 2012: 1st, Mini Bike NSR 50 Mobara Motowest GP
- 2013: 1st, Mobara Motowest GP Championship
- 2014: 1st, Motegi Road Race ST150
- 2015: 1st, Tsukuba J-GP3 Championship

=== Asia Talent Cup ===
==== Races by year ====
(key) (Races in bold indicate pole position; races in italics indicate fastest lap)

Year	Bike	1	2	3	4	5	6	7	8	9	10	11	12	Pos	Pts
2015	Honda	THA1; Ret	THA2; 15	QAT1; 15	QAT2; 15	MAL1; 9	MAL2; Ret	CHN1; 6	CHN2; 7	JPN1; Ret	JPN2; 9	SEP1; 13	SEP2; 11	15th	44
2016	Honda	THA1; 3	THA2; 2	QAT1; 4	QAT2; 5	MAL1; 2	MAL2; 2	CHN1; Ret	CHN2; 5	JPN1; 4	JPN2; 2	SEP1; 6	SEP2; 4	4th	167
2017	Honda	THA1; 3	THA2; 2	QAT1; NC	QAT2; 2	SUZ1; 4	SUZ2; 14	MAL1; 5	MAL2; 3	JPN1; 1	JPN2; NC	SEP1; 6	SEP2; 6	4th	143

=== Red Bull MotoGP Rookies Cup ===
==== Races by year ====
(key) (Races in bold indicate pole position; races in italics indicate fastest lap)

Year	1	2	3	4	5	6	7	8	9	10	11	12	13	Pos	Pts
2017	JER1; Ret	JER2; 6	ASS1; 10	ASS2; 6	SAC1; 9	SAC2; 5	BRN1; 5	BRN2; 3	RBR1; 3	RBR2; 4	MIS; Ret	ARA1; 7	ARA2; 4	6th	122
2018	JER1; 6	JER2; 5	ITA; 9	ASS; 3	ASS; Ret	GER1; 3	GER2; 6	**AUT**; 1	**AUT**; 7	MIS; 4	ARA; 8	ARA; 3		6th	141

=== FIM CEV Moto3 Junior World Championship ===
==== Races by year ====
(key) (Races in bold indicate pole position, races in italics indicate fastest lap)

Year	Bike	1	2	3	4	5	6	7	8	9	10	11	12	Pos	Pts
2018	KTM	EST	VAL1	VAL2	FRA	CAT1	CAT2	ARA	JER1; 8	JER2; 9	ALB; Ret	VAL1; 9	VAL2; 8	18th	30
2019	Honda	EST; 14	VAL1; 6	VAL2; 1	FRA; 32	CAT1; 26	CAT2; 5	ARA; 6	JER1; 5	JER2; 2	ALB; 5	VAL1; 4	VAL2; 7	5th	122

=== Grand Prix motorcycle racing ===
==== By season ====
Season	Class	Motorcycle	Team	Race	Win	Podium	Pole	FLap	Pts	Plcd
2019	Moto3	Honda	Estrella Galicia 0,0	4	0	0	0	0	8	29th
2020	Moto3	Honda	Estrella Galicia 0,0	15	0	0	0	1	14	24th
2021	Moto3	KTM	CarXpert Prüstel GP	16	0	0	0	0	47	20th
2022	Moto3	KTM	MT Helmets – MSi	20	0	0	0	0	94	12th
2023	Moto3	GasGas	GasGas Aspar Team	20	0	0	0	1	84	13th
2024	Moto3	KTM	MT Helmets – MSi	20	0	1	0	1	131	11th
2025	Moto3	KTM	Frinsa – MT Helmets – MSi	20	0	2	1	0	136	9th
2026	Moto3	KTM	Aeon Credit – MT Helmets – MSi	19	0	0	0	0	53*	19th*
Total				**134**	**0**	**3**	**1**	**3**	**567**	

==== By class ====
Class	Seasons	1st GP	1st pod	1st win	Race	Win	Podiums	Pole	FLap	Pts	WChmp
Moto3	2019–present	2019 Qatar	2024 Italy		134	0	3	1	3	567	0
Total	2019–present				**134**	**0**	**3**	**1**	**3**	**567**	**0**

==== Races by year ====
(key) (Races in bold indicate pole position, races in italics indicate fastest lap)

Year	Class	Bike	1	2	3	4	5	6	7	8	9	10	11	12	13	14	15	16	17	18	19	20	21	22	Pos	Pts
2019	Moto3	Honda	QAT; 20	ARG	AME	SPA	FRA	ITA; 17	CAT; 9	NED	GER	CZE	AUT	GBR	RSM	ARA	THA	JPN; 15	AUS	MAL	VAL				29th	8
2020	Moto3	Honda	QAT; 20	SPA; 16	ANC; 9	CZE; 17	AUT; 24	STY; 15	RSM; 12	EMI; 20	CAT; 15	FRA; 18	ARA; 24	TER; 23	EUR; 16	VAL; 15	POR; 17								24th	14
2021	Moto3	KTM	QAT; 14	DOH; 8	POR; 10	SPA; 10	FRA; 12	ITA; DNS	CAT; 14	GER; 18	NED; 17	STY; 7	AUT; DNS	GBR; 23	ARA; 11	RSM; 17	AME; 22	EMI; 11	ALG; 21	VAL; 19					20th	47
2022	Moto3	KTM	QAT; 9	INA; 11	ARG; 12	AME; 17	POR; 21	SPA; 8	FRA; 8	ITA; 5	CAT; 21	GER; Ret	NED; 8	GBR; 8	AUT; 13	RSM; 13	ARA; Ret	JPN; 8	THA; 10	AUS; Ret	MAL; 8	VAL; 9			12th	94
2023	Moto3	Gas Gas	POR; 16	ARG; 9	AME; 9	SPA; 25	FRA; 5	ITA; 15	GER; 8	NED; 15	GBR; 15	AUT; 7	CAT; 9	RSM; 14	IND; 15	JPN; 9	INA; 15	AUS; 15	THA; 9	MAL; 9	QAT; 21	VAL; 10			13th	84
2024	Moto3	KTM	QAT; Ret	POR; Ret	AME; 4	SPA; 4	FRA; 7	CAT; 11	ITA; 3	NED; 10	GER; 6	GBR; 6	AUT; 13	ARA; 19	RSM; 17	EMI; 15	INA; 17	JPN; 6	AUS; 6	THA; 11	MAL; 7	SLD; 5			11th	131
2025	Moto3	KTM	THA; Ret	ARG; 9	AME; 19	**QAT**; 3	SPA; 5	FRA; Ret	GBR; 8	ARA; 9	ITA; 10	NED; 11	GER; 15	CZE; 9	AUT; 2	HUN; 14	CAT; 9	RSM; 8	JPN; 6	INA; 8	AUS; 22	MAL; 4	POR	VAL	9th	136
2026	Moto3	KTM	THA; 24	BRA; 14	USA; 18	SPA; 17	FRA; 12	CAT; 14	ITA; 16	HUN; 17	CZE; 15	NED; 13	GER; 9	GBR; Ret	ARA; 21	RSM; 13	AUT; 10	JPN; 8	INA; 11	AUS; C	MAL; 11	QAT; 9	POR	VAL	19th*	53*

* Season still in progress.

=== Suzuka 8 Hours ===
Year	Class	Team	Co-riders	Bike	Pos
2025	**EWC**	(Japan) Astemo Pro Honda SI Racing	(Japan) Kohta Nozane (Japan) Kohta Arakawa	Honda CBR1000RR-R	Ret
2026	**EWC**	(Japan) Team Sakurai Honda	(Japan) Kazuki Ito (Japan) Daijiro Hiura	Honda CBR1000RR-R	NC
