= 2021 German motorcycle Grand Prix =

Eighth round of the 2021 Grand Prix motorcycle racing season

(Germany) 2021 German Grand Prix
Race details
- Race 8 of 18 races in the 2021 Grand Prix motorcycle racing season
- Date: 20 June 2021
- Official name: Liqui Moly Motorrad Grand Prix Deutschland
- Location: Sachsenring; Hohenstein-Ernstthal, Germany
- Course: Permanent racing facility; 3.671 km (2.281 mi)

MotoGP
Pole position
Rider	(France) Johann Zarco	Ducati
Time	1:20.236	
Fastest lap
Rider	(Portugal) Miguel Oliveira	KTM
Time	1:21.701 on lap 15	
Podium
First	(Spain) Marc Márquez	Honda
Second	(Portugal) Miguel Oliveira	KTM
Third	(France) Fabio Quartararo	Yamaha

Moto2
Pole position
Rider	(Spain) Raúl Fernández	Kalex
Time	1:23.397	
Fastest lap
Rider	(Australia) Remy Gardner	Kalex
Time	1:23.767 on lap 3	
Podium
First	(Australia) Remy Gardner	Kalex
Second	(Spain) Arón Canet	Boscoscuro
Third	(Italy) Marco Bezzecchi	Kalex

Moto3
Pole position
Rider	(Czech Republic) Filip Salač	Honda
Time	1:26.913	
Fastest lap
Rider	(Spain) Jaume Masiá	KTM
Time	1:27.033 on lap 3	
Podium
First	(Spain) Pedro Acosta	KTM
Second	(Japan) Kaito Toba	KTM
Third	(Italy) Dennis Foggia	Honda

The 2021 German motorcycle Grand Prix (officially known as the Liqui Moly Motorrad Grand Prix Deutschland) was the eighth round of the 2021 Grand Prix motorcycle racing season. It was held at the Sachsenring in Hohenstein-Ernstthal on 20 June 2021.

== Qualifying ==
=== MotoGP ===
Fastest session lap

Pos.	No.	Biker	Constructor	Qualifying times		Final grid	Row
Pos.	No.	Biker	Constructor	Q1	Q2	Final grid	Row
1	5	(France) Johann Zarco	Ducati	Qualified in Q2	1:20.236	1	1
2	20	(France) Fabio Quartararo	Yamaha	Qualified in Q2	1:20.247	2	1
3	41	(Spain) Aleix Espargaró	Aprilia	Qualified in Q2	1:20.447	3	1
4	43	(Australia) Jack Miller	Ducati	Qualified in Q2	1:20.508	4	2
5	93	(Spain) Marc Márquez	Honda	Qualified in Q2	1:20.567	5	2
6	88	(Portugal) Miguel Oliveira	KTM	Qualified in Q2	1:20.589	6	2
7	89	(Spain) Jorge Martín	Ducati	Qualified in Q2	1:20.617	7	3
8	44	(Spain) Pol Espargaró	Honda	1:20.700	1:20.659	8	3
9	30	(Japan) Takaaki Nakagami	Honda	Qualified in Q2	1:20.810	9	3
10	63	(Italy) Francesco Bagnaia	Ducati	Qualified in Q2	1:20.811	10	4
11	42	(Spain) Álex Rins	Suzuki	1:20.644	1:20.949	11	4
12	73	(Spain) Álex Márquez	Honda	Qualified in Q2	1:21.135	12	4
13	33	(South Africa) Brad Binder	KTM	1:20.736	N/A	13	5
14	10	(Italy) Luca Marini	Ducati	1:20.864	N/A	14	5
15	23	(Italy) Enea Bastianini	Ducati	1:20.953	N/A	18^{1}	6
16	46	(Italy) Valentino Rossi	Yamaha	1:20.972	N/A	15	5
17	36	(Spain) Joan Mir	Suzuki	1:21.014	N/A	16	6
18	21	(Italy) Franco Morbidelli	Yamaha	1:21.091	N/A	17	6
19	9	(Italy) Danilo Petrucci	KTM	1:21.137	N/A	19	7
20	27	(Spain) Iker Lecuona	KTM	1:21.154	N/A	20	7
21	12	(Spain) Maverick Viñales	Yamaha	1:21.165	N/A	21	7
22	32	(Italy) Lorenzo Savadori	Aprilia	1:21.411	N/A	22	8
OFFICIAL MOTOGP QUALIFYING RESULTS

==== Notes ====
- ^1 – Enea Bastianini was given a three-place grid penalty for irresponsible riding during Q1.

== Race ==
=== MotoGP ===
Pos.	No.	Rider	Team	Manufacturer	Laps	Time/Retired	Grid	Points
1	93	(Spain) Marc Márquez	Repsol Honda Team	Honda	30	41:07.243	5	25
2	88	(Portugal) Miguel Oliveira	Red Bull KTM Factory Racing	KTM	30	+1.610	6	20
3	20	(France) Fabio Quartararo	Monster Energy Yamaha MotoGP	Yamaha	30	+6.772	2	16
4	33	(South Africa) Brad Binder	Red Bull KTM Factory Racing	KTM	30	+7.922	13	13
5	63	(Italy) Francesco Bagnaia	Ducati Lenovo Team	Ducati	30	+8.591	10	11
6	43	(Australia) Jack Miller	Ducati Lenovo Team	Ducati	30	+9.086	4	10
7	41	(Spain) Aleix Espargaró	Aprilia Racing Team Gresini	Aprilia	30	+9.371	3	9
8	5	(France) Johann Zarco	Pramac Racing	Ducati	30	+11.439	1	8
9	36	(Spain) Joan Mir	Team Suzuki Ecstar	Suzuki	30	+11.625	16	7
10	44	(Spain) Pol Espargaró	Repsol Honda Team	Honda	30	+14.769	8	6
11	42	(Spain) Álex Rins	Team Suzuki Ecstar	Suzuki	30	+16.803	11	5
12	89	(Spain) Jorge Martín	Pramac Racing	Ducati	30	+16.915	7	4
13	30	(Japan) Takaaki Nakagami	LCR Honda Idemitsu	Honda	30	+19.217	9	3
14	46	(Italy) Valentino Rossi	Petronas Yamaha SRT	Yamaha	30	+22.300	15	2
15	10	(Italy) Luca Marini	Sky VR46 Avintia	Ducati	30	+23.615	14	1
16	23	(Italy) Enea Bastianini	Avintia Esponsorama	Ducati	30	+23.738	18 (Note: 3-place grid penalty.)	
17	27	(Spain) Iker Lecuona	Tech3 KTM Factory Racing	KTM	30	+23.946	20	
18	21	(Italy) Franco Morbidelli	Petronas Yamaha SRT	Yamaha	30	+24.414	17	
19	12	(Spain) Maverick Viñales	Monster Energy Yamaha MotoGP	Yamaha	30	+24.715	21	
Ret	32	(Italy) Lorenzo Savadori	Aprilia Racing Team Gresini	Aprilia	5	Accident	22	
Ret	9	(Italy) Danilo Petrucci	Tech3 KTM Factory Racing	KTM	4	Collision	19	
Ret	73	(Spain) Álex Márquez	LCR Honda Castrol	Honda	4	Collision	12	
Fastest lap: (Portugal) Miguel Oliveira (KTM) – 1:21.701 (lap 15)

=== Moto2 ===
Pos.	No.	Rider	Manufacturer	Laps	Time/Retired	Grid	Points
1	87	(Australia) Remy Gardner	Kalex	28	39:39.191	3	25
2	44	(Spain) Arón Canet	Boscoscuro	28	+6.158	10	20
3	72	(Italy) Marco Bezzecchi	Kalex	28	+7.030	4	16
4	21	(Italy) Fabio Di Giannantonio	Kalex	28	+8.145	2	13
5	22	(United Kingdom) Sam Lowes	Kalex	28	+9.888	7	11
6	23	(Germany) Marcel Schrötter	Kalex	28	+10.000	17	10
7	9	(Spain) Jorge Navarro	Boscoscuro	28	+16.039	6	9
8	75	(Spain) Albert Arenas	Boscoscuro	28	+19.394	18	8
9	42	(Spain) Marcos Ramírez	Kalex	28	+21.718	16	7
10	6	(United States) Cameron Beaubier	Kalex	28	+26.393	25	6
11	11	(Italy) Nicolò Bulega	Kalex	28	+26.732	11	5
12	2	(Spain) Alonso López	Kalex	28	+26.835	22	4
13	64	(Netherlands) Bo Bendsneyder	Kalex	28	+28.034	9	3
14	70	(Belgium) Barry Baltus	NTS	28	+28.984	30	2
15	13	(Italy) Celestino Vietti	Kalex	28	+31.414	21	1
16	14	(Italy) Tony Arbolino	Kalex	28	+33.176	20	
17	55	(Malaysia) Hafizh Syahrin	NTS	28	+33.425	26	
18	35	(Thailand) Somkiat Chantra	Kalex	28	+39.638	13	
19	12	(Switzerland) Thomas Lüthi	Kalex	28	+39.682	28	
20	62	(Italy) Stefano Manzi	Kalex	28	+44.613	27	
21	96	(United Kingdom) Jake Dixon	Kalex	28	+47.416	15	
Ret	79	(Japan) Ai Ogura	Kalex	27	Accident	8	
Ret	97	(Spain) Xavi Vierge	Kalex	27	Accident	5	
Ret	16	(United States) Joe Roberts	Kalex	27	Accident	12	
Ret	19	(Italy) Lorenzo Dalla Porta	Kalex	14	Chain	19	
Ret	37	(Spain) Augusto Fernández	Kalex	6	Collision	14	
Ret	7	(Italy) Lorenzo Baldassarri	MV Agusta	6	Accident	24	
Ret	25	(Spain) Raúl Fernández	Kalex	4	Accident	1	
Ret	54	(Spain) Fermín Aldeguer	Boscoscuro	3	Accident	23	
Ret	24	(Italy) Simone Corsi	MV Agusta	0	Accident	29	
OFFICIAL MOTO2 RACE REPORT

=== Moto3 ===
Pos.	No.	Rider	Manufacturer	Laps	Time/Retired	Grid	Points
1	37	(Spain) Pedro Acosta	KTM	27	39:38.791	13	25
2	27	(Japan) Kaito Toba	KTM	27	+0.130	5	20
3	7	(Italy) Dennis Foggia	Honda	27	+0.259	2	16
4 (Note: 1-position penalty for gaining a position while exceeding track limits.)	52	(Spain) Jeremy Alcoba	Honda	27	+0.206	20	13
5	16	(Italy) Andrea Migno	Honda	27	+0.459	10	11
6	23	(Italy) Niccolò Antonelli	KTM	27	+0.728	7	10
7 (Note: 1-position penalty for exceeding track limits on the last lap.)	11	(Spain) Sergio García	Gas Gas	27	+0.537	14	9
8	24	(Japan) Tatsuki Suzuki	Honda	27	+0.647	3	8
9	43	(Spain) Xavier Artigas	Honda	27	+0.864	15	7
10	28	(Spain) Izan Guevara	Gas Gas	27	+6.557	12	6
11	17	(United Kingdom) John McPhee	Honda	27	+7.512	4	5
12	22	(Italy) Elia Bartolini	KTM	27	+7.576	25	4
13	55	(Italy) Romano Fenati	Husqvarna	27	+20.902	8	3
14	40	(South Africa) Darryn Binder	Honda	27	+37.855	18	2
15	19	(Indonesia) Andi Farid Izdihar	Honda	27	+38.297	26	1
16	53	(Turkey) Deniz Öncü	KTM	27	+54.714	11	
17	66	(Australia) Joel Kelso	KTM	27	+58.423	24	
18	6	(Japan) Ryusei Yamanaka	KTM	27	+1:27.070	21	
Ret	82	(Italy) Stefano Nepa	KTM	15	Collision Damage	9	
Ret	5	(Spain) Jaume Masiá	KTM	14	Collision	17	
Ret	54	(Italy) Riccardo Rossi	KTM	14	Accident	22	
Ret	20	(France) Lorenzo Fellon	Honda	12	Collision	6	
Ret	12	(Czech Republic) Filip Salač	Honda	12	Mechanical	1	
Ret	2	(Argentina) Gabriel Rodrigo	Honda	10	Accident	19	
Ret	31	(Spain) Adrián Fernández	Husqvarna	7	Accident Damage	23	
Ret	92	(Japan) Yuki Kunii	Honda	3	Collision	16	
OFFICIAL MOTO3 RACE REPORT

== Championship standings after the race ==
Below are the standings for the top five riders, constructors, and teams after the round.

=== MotoGP ===
Riders' Championship standings

Pos.	Rider	Points
1	(France) Fabio Quartararo	131
2	(France) Johann Zarco	109
3	(Australia) Jack Miller	100
4	(Italy) Francesco Bagnaia	99
5	(Spain) Joan Mir	85

Constructors' Championship standings

Pos.	Constructor	Points
1	(Japan) Yamaha	159
2	(Italy) Ducati	154
3	(Austria) KTM	103
4	(Japan) Suzuki	89
5	(Japan) Honda	77

Teams' Championship standings

	Pos.	Team	Points
	1	(Japan) Monster Energy Yamaha MotoGP	206
	2	(Italy) Ducati Lenovo Team	199
	3	(Italy) Pramac Racing	136
1	4	(Austria) Red Bull KTM Factory Racing	130
1	5	(Japan) Team Suzuki Ecstar	113

=== Moto2 ===
Riders' Championship standings

Pos.	Rider	Points
1	(Australia) Remy Gardner	164
2	(Spain) Raúl Fernández	128
3	(Italy) Marco Bezzecchi	117
4	(United Kingdom) Sam Lowes	86
5	(Italy) Fabio Di Giannantonio	73

Constructors' Championship standings

Pos.	Constructor	Points
1	(Germany) Kalex	200
2	(Italy) Boscoscuro	72
3	(Italy) MV Agusta	10
4	(Japan) NTS	10

Teams' Championship standings

Pos.	Team	Points
1	(Finland) Red Bull KTM Ajo	292
2	(Italy) Sky Racing Team VR46	133
3	(Belgium) Elf Marc VDS Racing Team	120
4	(Germany) Liqui Moly Intact GP	89
5	(Italy) Federal Oil Gresini Moto2	83

=== Moto3 ===
Riders' Championship standings

	Pos.	Rider	Points
	1	(Spain) Pedro Acosta	145
	2	(Spain) Sergio García	90
	3	(Spain) Jaume Masiá	72
1	4	(Italy) Niccolò Antonelli	65
1	5	(Italy) Romano Fenati	64

Constructors' Championship standings

Pos.	Constructor	Points
1	(Austria) KTM	177
2	(Japan) Honda	153
3	(Spain) Gas Gas	102
4	(Sweden) Husqvarna	68

Teams' Championship standings

	Pos.	Team	Points
	1	(Finland) Red Bull KTM Ajo	217
	2	(Spain) Gaviota GasGas Aspar Team	122
	3	(Italy) Indonesian Racing Gresini Moto3	103
	4	(Italy) Rivacold Snipers Team	93
1	5	(Malaysia) Petronas Sprinta Racing	87

== Notes ==
Previous race: 2021 Catalan Grand Prix	FIM Grand Prix World Championship; 2021 season	Next race: 2021 Dutch TT
Previous race: 2019 German Grand Prix	German motorcycle Grand Prix	Next race: 2022 German Grand Prix
