= 2021 Italian motorcycle Grand Prix =

Sixth round of the 2021 Grand Prix motorcycle racing season

(Italy) 2021 Italian Grand Prix
Race details
- Race 6 of 18 races in the 2021 Grand Prix motorcycle racing season
- Date: 30 May 2021
- Official name: Gran Premio d'Italia Oakley
- Location: Autodromo Internazionale del Mugello; Scarperia e San Piero, Italy
- Course: Permanent racing facility; 5.245 km (3.259 mi)

MotoGP
Pole position
Rider	(France) Fabio Quartararo	Yamaha
Time	1:45.187	
Fastest lap
Rider	(France) Johann Zarco	Ducati
Time	1:46.810 on lap 2	
Podium
First	(France) Fabio Quartararo	Yamaha
Second	(Portugal) Miguel Oliveira	KTM
Third	(Spain) Joan Mir	Suzuki

Moto2
Pole position
Rider	(Spain) Raúl Fernández	Kalex
Time	1:50.723	
Fastest lap
Rider	(United Kingdom) Sam Lowes	Kalex
Time	1:51.208 on lap 3	
Podium
First	(Australia) Remy Gardner	Kalex
Second	(Spain) Raúl Fernández	Kalex
Third	(Italy) Marco Bezzecchi	Kalex

Moto3
Pole position
Rider	(Japan) Tatsuki Suzuki	Honda
Time	1:56.001	
Fastest lap
Rider	(Spain) Sergio García	Gas Gas
Time	1:57.188 on lap 2	
Podium
First	(Italy) Dennis Foggia	Honda
Second	(Spain) Jaume Masiá	KTM
Third	(Argentina) Gabriel Rodrigo	Honda

The 2021 Italian motorcycle Grand Prix (officially known as the Gran Premio d'Italia Oakley) was the sixth round of the 2021 Grand Prix motorcycle racing season. It was held at the Autodromo Internazionale del Mugello in Scarperia e San Piero on 30 May 2021. At this race, Sky VR46 using the Italian tricolour special livery Mugello.

The weekend was marred by the death of Jason Dupasquier. Dupasquier collided with Ayumu Sasaki during Moto3 qualifying, with him then being hit by Jeremy Alcoba. Alcoba and Sasaki were unhurt, but Dupasquier was critically wounded, before being airlifted to Careggi Hospital in Florence. Dupasquier died at the hospital due to his injuries a day after the accident.

== Qualifying ==
=== MotoGP ===
Fastest session lap

Pos.	No.	Biker	Constructor	Qualifying times		Final grid	Row
Pos.	No.	Biker	Constructor	Q1	Q2	Final grid	Row
1	20	(France) Fabio Quartararo	Yamaha	Qualified in Q2	1:45.187	1	1
2	63	(Italy) Francesco Bagnaia	Ducati	Qualified in Q2	1:45.417	2	1
3	5	(France) Johann Zarco	Ducati	Qualified in Q2	1:45.432	3	1
4	41	(Spain) Aleix Espargaró	Aprilia	1:46.024	1:45.538	4	2
5	43	(Australia) Jack Miller	Ducati	Qualified in Q2	1:45.598	5	2
6	33	(South Africa) Brad Binder	KTM	Qualified in Q2	1:45.743	6	2
7	88	(Portugal) Miguel Oliveira	KTM	Qualified in Q2	1:45.745	7	3
8	42	(Spain) Álex Rins	Suzuki	Qualified in Q2	1:45.996	8	3
9	36	(Spain) Joan Mir	Suzuki	Qualified in Q2	1:46.076	9	3
10	21	(Italy) Franco Morbidelli	Yamaha	Qualified in Q2	1:46.084	10	4
11	93	(Spain) Marc Márquez	Honda	1:45.924	1:46.125	11	4
12	44	(Spain) Pol Espargaró	Honda	Qualified in Q2	1:46.393	12	4
13	12	(Spain) Maverick Viñales	Yamaha	1:46.045	N/A	13	5
14	23	(Italy) Enea Bastianini	Ducati	1:46.129	N/A	14	5
15	30	(Japan) Takaaki Nakagami	Honda	1:46.195	N/A	15	5
16	51	(Italy) Michele Pirro	Ducati	1:46.302	N/A	16	6
17	10	(Italy) Luca Marini	Ducati	1:46.481	N/A	17	6
18	9	(Italy) Danilo Petrucci	KTM	1:46.548	N/A	18	6
19	46	(Italy) Valentino Rossi	Yamaha	1:46.770	N/A	19	7
20	27	(Spain) Iker Lecuona	KTM	1:47.084	N/A	20	7
21	32	(Italy) Lorenzo Savadori	Aprilia	1:47.146	N/A	21	7
22	73	(Spain) Álex Márquez	Honda	1:47.216	N/A	22	8
OFFICIAL MOTOGP QUALIFYING RESULTS

== Race ==
=== MotoGP ===
Pos.	No.	Rider	Team	Manufacturer	Laps	Time/Retired	Grid	Points
1	20	(France) Fabio Quartararo	Monster Energy Yamaha MotoGP	Yamaha	23	41:16.344	1	25
2	88	(Portugal) Miguel Oliveira	Red Bull KTM Factory Racing	KTM	23	+2.592	7	20
3	36	(Spain) Joan Mir	Team Suzuki Ecstar	Suzuki	23	+3.000	9	16
4	5	(France) Johann Zarco	Pramac Racing	Ducati	23	+3.535	3	13
5	33	(South Africa) Brad Binder	Red Bull KTM Factory Racing	KTM	23	+4.903	6	11
6	43	(Australia) Jack Miller	Ducati Lenovo Team	Ducati	23	+6.233	5	10
7	41	(Spain) Aleix Espargaró	Aprilia Racing Team Gresini	Aprilia	23	+8.030	4	9
8	12	(Spain) Maverick Viñales	Monster Energy Yamaha MotoGP	Yamaha	23	+17.239	13	8
9	9	(Italy) Danilo Petrucci	Tech3 KTM Factory Racing	KTM	23	+23.296	18	7
10	46	(Italy) Valentino Rossi	Petronas Yamaha SRT	Yamaha	23	+25.146	19	6
11	27	(Spain) Iker Lecuona	Tech3 KTM Factory Racing	KTM	23	+25.152	20	5
12	44	(Spain) Pol Espargaró	Repsol Honda Team	Honda	23	+26.059	12	4
13	51	(Italy) Michele Pirro	Pramac Racing	Ducati	23	+26.182	16	3
14	73	(Spain) Álex Márquez	LCR Honda Castrol	Honda	23	+29.400	22	2
15	32	(Italy) Lorenzo Savadori	Aprilia Racing Team Gresini	Aprilia	23	+32.378	21	1
16	21	(Italy) Franco Morbidelli	Petronas Yamaha SRT	Yamaha	23	+37.906	10	
17	10	(Italy) Luca Marini	Sky VR46 Avintia	Ducati	23	+50.306	17	
Ret	30	(Japan) Takaaki Nakagami	LCR Honda Idemitsu	Honda	19	Accident	15	
Ret	42	(Spain) Álex Rins	Team Suzuki Ecstar	Suzuki	18	Accident	8	
Ret	63	(Italy) Francesco Bagnaia	Ducati Lenovo Team	Ducati	1	Accident	2	
Ret	93	(Spain) Marc Márquez	Repsol Honda Team	Honda	1	Accident	11	
Ret	23	(Italy) Enea Bastianini	Avintia Esponsorama	Ducati	0	Accident	14	
Fastest lap: (France) Johann Zarco (Ducati) – 1:46.810 (lap 2)

=== Moto2 ===
Pos.	No.	Rider	Manufacturer	Laps	Time/Retired	Grid	Points
1	87	(Australia) Remy Gardner	Kalex	21	39:17.667	4	25
2	25	(Spain) Raúl Fernández	Kalex	21	+0.014	1	20
3	72	(Italy) Marco Bezzecchi	Kalex	21	+8.021	7	16
4 (Note: 1-position penalty for exceeding track limits on the last lap.)	16	(United States) Joe Roberts	Kalex	21	+8.004	10	13
5	23	(Germany) Marcel Schrötter	Kalex	21	+12.343	9	11
6	79	(Japan) Ai Ogura	Kalex	21	+23.170	12	10
7	14	(Italy) Tony Arbolino	Kalex	21	+23.764	6	9
8	6	(United States) Cameron Beaubier	Kalex	21	+34.825	25	8
9	55	(Malaysia) Hafizh Syahrin	NTS	21	+34.849	20	7
10	62	(Italy) Stefano Manzi	Kalex	21	+34.965	23	6
11	44	(Spain) Arón Canet	Boscoscuro	21	+35.250	17	5
12	54	(Spain) Fermín Aldeguer	Boscoscuro	21	+35.300	15	4
13	40	(Spain) Héctor Garzó	Kalex	21	+35.450	19	3
14	96	(United Kingdom) Jake Dixon	Kalex	21	+36.161	22	2
15	64	(Netherlands) Bo Bendsneyder	Kalex	21	+40.700	16	1
16	13	(Italy) Celestino Vietti	Kalex	21	+46.263	26	
17	70	(Belgium) Barry Baltus	NTS	21	+46.403	27	
18	35	(Thailand) Somkiat Chantra	Kalex	21	+48.566	18	
19	10	(Italy) Tommaso Marcon	MV Agusta	21	+1:16.213 (Note: 6-second penalty for not completing a double long lap penalty.)	29	
Ret	42	(Spain) Marcos Ramírez	Kalex	18	Accident	14	
Ret	22	(United Kingdom) Sam Lowes	Kalex	15	Accident	2	
Ret	21	(Italy) Fabio Di Giannantonio	Kalex	11	Accident Damage	5	
Ret	24	(Italy) Simone Corsi	MV Agusta	11	Mechanical	21	
Ret	75	(Spain) Albert Arenas	Boscoscuro	11	Accident	28	
Ret	97	(Spain) Xavi Vierge	Kalex	5	Accident	8	
Ret	9	(Spain) Jorge Navarro	Boscoscuro	4	Accident	3	
Ret	7	(Italy) Lorenzo Baldassarri	MV Agusta	2	Accident	24	
Ret	19	(Italy) Lorenzo Dalla Porta	Kalex	0	Accident	11	
Ret	37	(Spain) Augusto Fernández	Kalex	0	Accident	13	
DNS	11	(Italy) Nicolò Bulega	Kalex		Did not start		
DNS	12	(Switzerland) Thomas Lüthi	Kalex		Did not start		
OFFICIAL MOTO2 RACE REPORT

- Thomas Lüthi withdrew from the race on Sunday morning following the fatal accident of compatriot and Moto3 rider Jason Dupasquier.

=== Moto3 ===
Pos.	No.	Rider	Manufacturer	Laps	Time/Retired	Grid	Points
1	7	(Italy) Dennis Foggia	Honda	20	39:37.497	4	25
2	5	(Spain) Jaume Masià	KTM	20	+0.036	5	20
3	2	(Argentina) Gabriel Rodrigo	Honda	20	+0.145	3	16
4	71	(Japan) Ayumu Sasaki	KTM	20	+0.240	10	13
5	40	(South Africa) Darryn Binder	Honda	20	+0.499	15	11
6	55	(Italy) Romano Fenati	Husqvarna	20	+0.711	7	10
7	17	(United Kingdom) John McPhee	Honda	20	+0.918	9	9
8	37	(Spain) Pedro Acosta	KTM	20	+0.745	2	8
9	11	(Spain) Sergio García	Gas Gas	20	+0.861	14	7
10	24	(Japan) Tatsuki Suzuki	Honda	20	+0.963	1	6
11	12	(Czech Republic) Filip Salač	Honda	20	+1.080	17	5
12	27	(Japan) Kaito Toba	KTM	20	+1.351	11	4
13	23	(Italy) Niccolò Antonelli	KTM	20	+1.429	8	3
14	82	(Italy) Stefano Nepa	KTM	20	+4.472 (Note: 3-second penalty for not completing a long lap penalty.)	13	2
15	52	(Spain) Jeremy Alcoba	Honda	20	+12.491	6	1
16	43	(Spain) Xavier Artigas	Honda	20	+23.493	19	
17	28	(Spain) Izan Guevara	Gas Gas	20	+23.499	27	
18	54	(Italy) Riccardo Rossi	KTM	20	+23.609	20	
19	20	(France) Lorenzo Fellon	Honda	20	+23.774	23	
20	22	(Italy) Elia Bartolini	KTM	20	+39.959	22	
21	19	(Indonesia) Andi Farid Izdihar	Honda	20	+40.023	21	
22	32	(Japan) Takuma Matsuyama	Honda	20	+40.035	28	
Ret	53	(Turkey) Deniz Öncü	KTM	0	Accident	12	
Ret	16	(Italy) Andrea Migno	Honda	0	Collision	16	
Ret	67	(Italy) Alberto Surra	KTM	0	Collision	18	
Ret	31	(Spain) Adrián Fernández	Husqvarna	0	Collision	24	
Ret	99	(Spain) Carlos Tatay	KTM	0	Collision	25	
Ret	73	(Austria) Maximilian Kofler	KTM	0	Collision	26	
DNS	50	(Switzerland) Jason Dupasquier	KTM		Fatal accident in qualifying		
DNS	6	(Japan) Ryusei Yamanaka	KTM		Did not start		
OFFICIAL MOTO3 RACE REPORT

- Ryusei Yamanaka withdrew from the race on Sunday morning following the fatal accident of his teammate Jason Dupasquier.

== Championship standings after the race ==
Below are the standings for the top five riders, constructors, and teams after the round.

=== MotoGP ===
Riders' Championship standings

	Pos.	Rider	Points
	1	(France) Fabio Quartararo	105
1	2	(France) Johann Zarco	81
1	3	(Italy) Francesco Bagnaia	79
	4	(Australia) Jack Miller	74
1	5	(Spain) Joan Mir	65

Constructors' Championship standings

	Pos.	Constructor	Points
1	1	(Japan) Yamaha	132
1	2	(Italy) Ducati	123
	3	(Japan) Suzuki	69
1	4	(Austria) KTM	58
1	5	(Japan) Honda	47

Teams' Championship standings

	Pos.	Team	Points
1	1	(Japan) Monster Energy Yamaha MotoGP	169
1	2	(Italy) Ducati Lenovo Team	153
	3	(Italy) Pramac Racing	102
1	4	(Japan) Team Suzuki Ecstar	88
4	5	(Austria) Red Bull KTM Factory Racing	64

=== Moto2 ===
Riders' Championship standings

Pos.	Rider	Points
1	(Australia) Remy Gardner	114
2	(Spain) Raúl Fernández	108
3	(Italy) Marco Bezzecchi	88
4	(United Kingdom) Sam Lowes	66
5	(Italy) Fabio Di Giannantonio	60

Constructors' Championship standings

Pos.	Constructor	Points
1	(Germany) Kalex	150
2	(Italy) Boscoscuro	47
3	(Italy) MV Agusta	10
4	(Japan) NTS	8

Teams' Championship standings

	Pos.	Team	Points
	1	(Finland) Red Bull KTM Ajo	222
1	2	(Italy) Sky Racing Team VR46	101
1	3	(Belgium) Elf Marc VDS Racing Team	89
1	4	(Germany) Liqui Moly Intact GP	68
1	5	(Italy) Federal Oil Gresini Moto2	65

=== Moto3 ===
Riders' Championship standings

	Pos.	Rider	Points
	1	(Spain) Pedro Acosta	111
5	2	(Spain) Jaume Masiá	59
3	3	(Japan) Ayumu Sasaki	57
2	4	(Spain) Sergio García	56
1	5	(Italy) Romano Fenati	56

Constructors' Championship standings

Pos.	Constructor	Points
1	(Austria) KTM	136
2	(Japan) Honda	117
3	(Spain) Gas Gas	68
4	(Sweden) Husqvarna	60

Teams' Championship standings

	Pos.	Team	Points
	1	(Finland) Red Bull KTM Ajo	170
1	2	(Spain) Gaviota GasGas Aspar Team	82
1	3	(Italy) Rivacold Snipers Team	82
4	4	(Malaysia) Petronas Sprinta Racing	69
	5	(Italy) Sterilgarda Max Racing Team	66

== Notes ==
Previous race: 2021 French Grand Prix	FIM Grand Prix World Championship; 2021 season	Next race: 2021 Catalan Grand Prix
Previous race: 2019 Italian Grand Prix	Italian motorcycle Grand Prix	Next race: 2022 Italian Grand Prix
