= Stefano Nepa =

Italian motorcycle racer (born 2001)

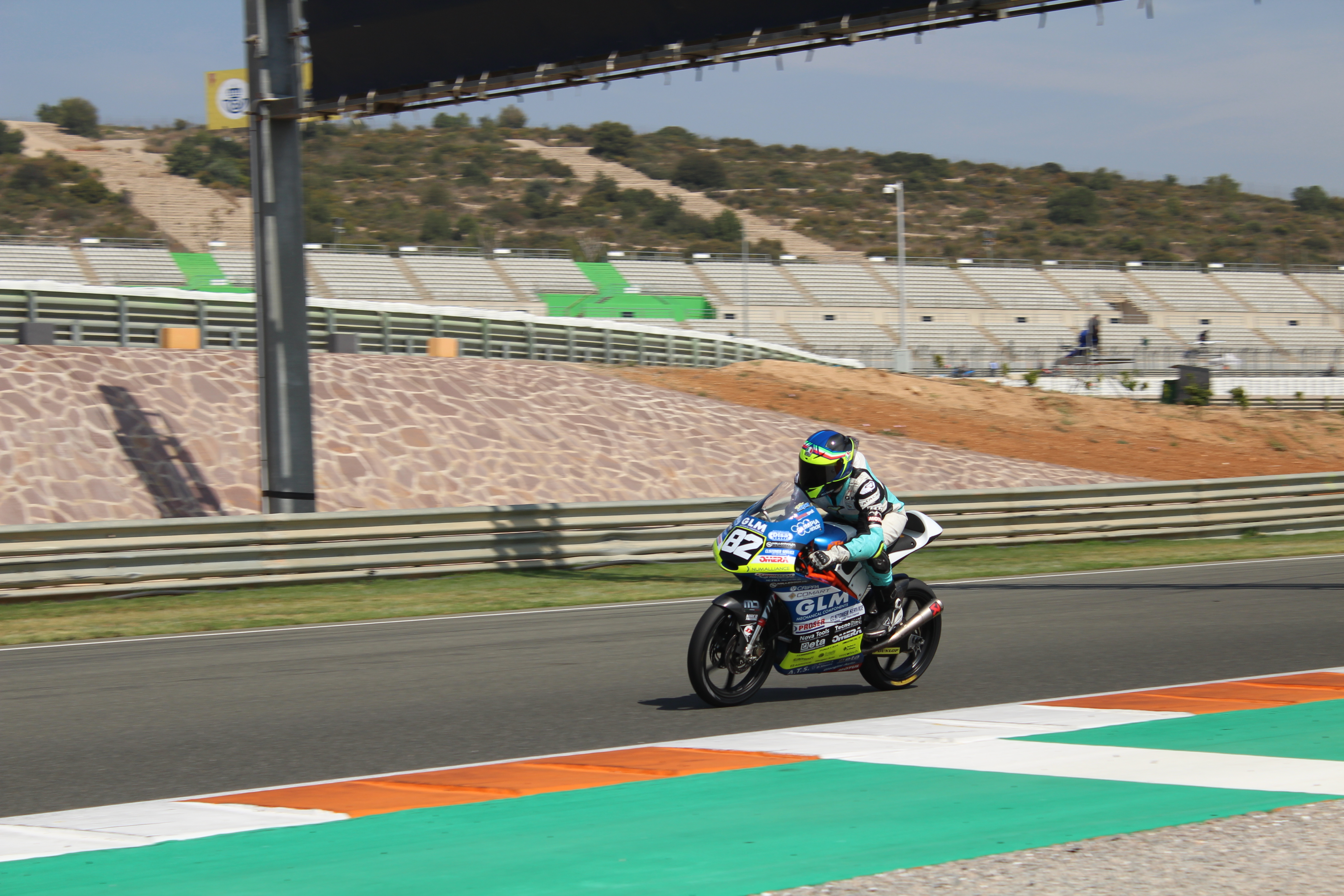
- Nepa in 2018
- Nationality: Italian
- Born: 21 November 2001 (age 24); Giulianova, Italy
- Current team: Klint Forward Racing
- Bike number: 82
Motorcycle racing career statistics
Moto3 World Championship
Active years	2018–2025
Manufacturers	KTM (2018–2024); Honda (2025)
2025 championship position	18th (51 pts)
Starts / Wins / Podiums / Poles / F. laps / Points; 137 / 0 / 0 / 0 / 4 / 439

Stefano Nepa (born 21 November 2001) is an Italian Grand Prix motorcycle racer, currently competing in the 2026 Moto2 European Championship for the Klint Forward Racing team.

== Career ==
In his native Italy, Nepa won the CIV PreMoto3 250cc 4-stroke championship in 2014 and competed in the CIV Moto3 championship from 2016 to 2018.

=== Moto3 World Championship ===
Nepa moved onto FIM CEV Moto3 Junior World Championship in 2018 while also making a wild-card appearance at Mugello which marked his Grand Prix debut. In the same year, he became a full-time Grand Prix rider when he replaced Makar Yurchenko in the CIP - Green Power team before the Dutch TT. He scored his first championship points at the season finale in Valencia.

In 2019, after starting the season in the FIM CEV Moto3 Junior World Championship and appearing as a wild-card at the Spanish Grand Prix, Nepa replaced Vicente Pérez from the Dutch TT onwards, achieving a best finish of 8th in Thailand. For the 2020 Moto3 season, he was signed by Aspar Team as a full-time rider.

==== Angeluss MTA Team (2022-present) ====
From 2021 season, Nepa competed for the Angeluss MTA Team.

== Career statistics ==
=== FIM CEV Moto3 Junior World Championship ===
==== Races by year ====
(key) (Races in bold indicate pole position, races in italics indicate fastest lap)

Year	Bike	1	2	3	4	5	6	7	8	9	10	11	12	Pos	Pts
2016	Mahindra	VAL1; 19	VAL2; 23	LMS; 22	ARA	CAT1	CAT2	ALB	ALG	JER1	JER2	VAL1	VAL2	29th	6
2016	KTM	VAL1	VAL2	LMS	ARA	CAT1	CAT2	ALB	ALG	JER1; 18	JER2; 23	VAL1; 10	VAL2; 28	29th	6
2017	Honda	ALB; Ret	LMS; 16	CAT1; 24	CAT2; 15	VAL1; 16	VAL2; 18	EST; 12	JER1	JER1	ARA	VAL1	VAL2	21st	26
2017	KTM	ALB	LMS	CAT1	CAT2	VAL1	VAL2	EST	JER1; 14	JER1; 9	ARA; 18	VAL1; 9	VAL2; 11	21st	26
2018	KTM	EST	VAL1; 26	VAL2; 28	FRA; 23	CAT1; 5	CAT2; 7	ARA	JER1	JER2	ALB	VAL1; 23	VAL2; Ret	21st	20
2019	KTM	EST; 22	VAL1; 7	VAL2; 9	FRA; 21	CAT1; Ret	CAT2; 7	ARA	JER1	JER2	ALB	VAL1	VAL2	19th	25

=== FIM Moto2 European Championship ===
==== Races by year ====
(key) (Races in bold indicate pole position; races in italics indicate fastest lap)

Year	Bike	1	2	3	4	5	6	7	8	9	10	11	Pos	Pts
2026	Forward	CAT1; 10	CAT2; 15	EST1	EST2	JER	MAG1	MAG2	VAL	ARA1	ARA2	MIS	12th*	7*

* Season still in progress.

=== Grand Prix motorcycle racing ===
==== By season ====
Season	Class	Motorcycle	Team	Race	Win	Podium	Pole	FLap	Pts	Plcd
2018	Moto3	KTM	NRT Junior Team	12	0	0	0	0	4	35th
2018	Moto3	KTM	CIP Green Power	12	0	0	0	0	4	35th
2019	Moto3	KTM	Fundación Andreas Pérez 77; Reale Avintia Arizona 77	13	0	0	0	0	24	25th
2020	Moto3	KTM	Aspar Team	15	0	0	0	0	38	20th
2021	Moto3	KTM	BOE Owlride	18	0	0	0	1	63	18th
2022	Moto3	KTM	Angeluss MTA Team	19	0	0	0	0	64	18th
2023	Moto3	KTM	Angeluss MTA Team	20	0	0	0	0	102	12th
2024	Moto3	KTM	LEVEL UP MTA Team	20	0	0	0	1	93	13th
2025	Moto3	Honda	Sic58 Squadra Corse	20	0	0	0	0	46*	18th*
Total				**137**	**0**	**0**	**0**	**2**	**434**	

==== By class ====
Class	Seasons	1st GP	1st pod	1st win	Race	Win	Podiums	Pole	FLap	Pts	WChmp
Moto3	2018–present	2018 Italy			137	0	0	0	2	434	0
Total	2018–present				**137**	**0**	**0**	**0**	**2**	**434**	**0**

==== Races by year ====
(key) (Races in bold indicate pole position; races in italics indicate fastest lap)

Year	Class	Bike	1	2	3	4	5	6	7	8	9	10	11	12	13	14	15	16	17	18	19	20	21	22	Pos	Pts
2018	Moto3	KTM	QAT	ARG	AME	SPA	FRA	ITA; Ret	CAT	NED; 27	GER; 21	CZE; Ret	AUT; 27	GBR; C	RSM; 17	ARA; 22	THA; 19	JPN; 20	AUS; 17	MAL; 21	VAL; 12				35th	4
2019	Moto3	KTM	QAT	ARG	AME	SPA; 19	FRA	ITA	CAT	NED; 20	GER; 18	CZE; 17	AUT; 22	GBR; 22	RSM; 11	ARA; 23	THA; 8	JPN; 16	AUS; 10	MAL; Ret	VAL; 11				25th	24
2020	Moto3	KTM	QAT; 22	SPA; 12	ANC; 14	CZE; 10	AUT; 15	STY; 9	RSM; 14	EMI; 15	CAT; 14	FRA; 15	ARA; 23	TER; 20	EUR; 7	VAL; 13	POR; 19								20th	38
2021	Moto3	KTM	QAT; 18	DOH; 16	POR; 11	SPA; 15	FRA; 17	ITA; 14	CAT; 10	GER; Ret	NED; 11	STY; 19	AUT; 13	GBR; 17	ARA; 8	RSM; 9	AME; 11	EMI; 5	ALR; 16	VAL; 6					18th	63
2022	Moto3	KTM	QAT; 13	INA; Ret	ARG; 16	AME; 13	POR; 15	SPA; 15	FRA; 17	ITA; Ret	CAT; 16	GER; 15	NED; 7	GBR; 5	AUT; 15	RSM; 10	ARA; 19	JPN; 12	THA; 4	AUS; 5	MAL; Ret	VAL			18th	64
2023	Moto3	KTM	POR; 7	ARG; 6	AME; Ret	SPA; 15	FRA; 10	ITA; 9	GER; 9	NED; 10	GBR; 12	AUT; 10	CAT; 5	RSM; 13	IND; 9	JPN; 4	INA; 10	AUS; 12	THA; 17	MAL; 15	QAT; 18	VAL; 15			12th	102
2024	Moto3	KTM	QAT; 6	POR; 7	AME; 18	SPA; 9	FRA; 17	CAT; 13	ITA; Ret	NED; 9	GER; 12	GBR; 5	AUT; Ret	ARA; 13	RSM; 14	EMI; 14	INA; 15	JPN; 10	AUS; 4	THA; 9	MAL; 8	SLD; Ret			13th	93
2025	Moto3	Honda	THA; 4	ARG; 10	AME; Ret	QAT; 8	SPA; 14	FRA; Ret	GBR; 16	ARA; NC	ITA; 14	NED; 13	GER; 13	CZE; 17	AUT; 24	HUN; 17	CAT; 23	RSM; 18	JPN; 15	INA; 9	AUS; 15	MAL; 21	POR; 18	VAL; 11	18th	51

* Season still in progress.
