= 2019 British motorcycle Grand Prix =

2019 motorcycle race in Great Britain

(United Kingdom) 2019 British Grand Prix
Race details
- Race 12 of 19 races in the 2019 Grand Prix motorcycle racing season
- Date: 25 August 2019
- Official name: GoPro British Grand Prix
- Location: Silverstone Circuit, Silverstone, United Kingdom
- Course: Permanent racing facility; 5.900 km (3.666 mi)

MotoGP
Pole position
Rider	(Spain) Marc Márquez	Honda
Time	1:58.168	
Fastest lap
Rider	(Spain) Marc Márquez	Honda
Time	1:59.936 on lap 10	
Podium
First	(Spain) Álex Rins	Suzuki
Second	(Spain) Marc Márquez	Honda
Third	(Spain) Maverick Viñales	Yamaha

Moto2
Pole position
Rider	(Spain) Álex Márquez	Kalex
Time	2:04.374	
Fastest lap
Rider	(Spain) Augusto Fernández	Kalex
Time	2:04.835 on lap 17	
Podium
First	(Spain) Augusto Fernández	Kalex
Second	(Spain) Jorge Navarro	Speed Up
Third	(South Africa) Brad Binder	KTM

Moto3
Pole position
Rider	(Italy) Tony Arbolino	Honda
Time	2:11.631	
Fastest lap
Rider	(Japan) Tatsuki Suzuki	Honda
Time	2:12.140 on lap 6	
Podium
First	(Spain) Marcos Ramírez	Honda
Second	(Italy) Tony Arbolino	Honda
Third	(Italy) Lorenzo Dalla Porta	Honda

The 2019 British motorcycle Grand Prix was the twelfth round of the 2019 MotoGP season. It was held at the Silverstone Circuit in Silverstone on 25 August 2019. The race saw one of the closest finishes in the history of MotoGP, as Álex Rins won the race by just 0.013s ahead of Marc Márquez.

== Classification ==
=== MotoGP ===
Pos.	No.	Rider	Team	Manufacturer	Laps	Time/Retired	Grid	Points
1	42	(Spain) Álex Rins	Team Suzuki Ecstar	Suzuki	20	40:12.799	5	25
2	93	(Spain) Marc Márquez	Repsol Honda Team	Honda	20	+0.013	1	20
3	12	(Spain) Maverick Viñales	Monster Energy Yamaha MotoGP	Yamaha	20	+0.620	6	16
4	46	(Italy) Valentino Rossi	Monster Energy Yamaha MotoGP	Yamaha	20	+11.439	2	13
5	21	(Italy) Franco Morbidelli	Petronas Yamaha SRT	Yamaha	20	+13.109	8	11
6	35	(United Kingdom) Cal Crutchlow	LCR Honda Castrol	Honda	20	+19.169	9	10
7	9	(Italy) Danilo Petrucci	Ducati Team	Ducati	20	+19.682	11	9
8	43	(Australia) Jack Miller	Pramac Racing	Ducati	20	+20.318	3	8
9	44	(Spain) Pol Espargaró	Red Bull KTM Factory Racing	KTM	20	+21.079	13	7
10	29	(Italy) Andrea Iannone	Aprilia Racing Team Gresini	Aprilia	20	+25.144	17	6
11	63	(Italy) Francesco Bagnaia	Pramac Racing	Ducati	20	+40.317	18	5
12	50	(France) Sylvain Guintoli	Team Suzuki Ecstar	Suzuki	20	+45.478	19	4
13	55	(Malaysia) Hafizh Syahrin	Red Bull KTM Tech3	KTM	20	+54.783	20	3
14	99	(Spain) Jorge Lorenzo	Repsol Honda Team	Honda	20	+56.651	21	2
15	17	(Czech Republic) Karel Abraham	Reale Avintia Racing	Ducati	20	+1:29.282	22	1
16	53	(Spain) Tito Rabat	Reale Avintia Racing	Ducati	20	+1:31.716	16	
17	30	(Japan) Takaaki Nakagami	LCR Honda Idemitsu	Honda	20	+1:40.420	10	
Ret	41	(Spain) Aleix Espargaró	Aprilia Racing Team Gresini	Aprilia	19	Engine	12	
Ret	88	(Portugal) Miguel Oliveira	Red Bull KTM Tech3	KTM	8	Collision	15	
Ret	5	(France) Johann Zarco	Red Bull KTM Factory Racing	KTM	8	Collision	14	
Ret	20	(France) Fabio Quartararo	Petronas Yamaha SRT	Yamaha	0	Accident	4	
Ret	4	(Italy) Andrea Dovizioso	Ducati Team	Ducati	0	Collision	7	

=== Moto2 ===
Pos.	No.	Rider	Manufacturer	Laps	Time/Retired	Grid	Points
1	40	(Spain) Augusto Fernández	Kalex	18	37:41.833	3	25
2	9	(Spain) Jorge Navarro	Speed Up	18	+0.489	2	20
3	41	(South Africa) Brad Binder	KTM	18	+0.571	8	16
4	87	(Australia) Remy Gardner	Kalex	18	+0.738	4	13
5	45	(Japan) Tetsuta Nagashima	Kalex	18	+3.276	7	11
6	21	(Italy) Fabio Di Giannantonio	Speed Up	18	+9.065	10	10
7	7	(Italy) Lorenzo Baldassarri	Kalex	18	+9.108	18	9
8	12	(Switzerland) Thomas Lüthi	Kalex	18	+9.355	12	8
9	10	(Italy) Luca Marini	Kalex	18	+13.119	6	7
10	97	(Spain) Xavi Vierge	Kalex	18	+13.753	5	6
11	27	(Spain) Iker Lecuona	KTM	18	+16.326	15	5
12	88	(Spain) Jorge Martín	KTM	18	+16.382	19	4
13	54	(Italy) Mattia Pasini	Kalex	18	+16.829	14	3
14	23	(Germany) Marcel Schrötter	Kalex	18	+17.843	13	2
15	5	(Italy) Andrea Locatelli	Kalex	18	+19.836	16	1
16	35	(Thailand) Somkiat Chantra	Kalex	18	+20.920	22	
17	62	(Italy) Stefano Manzi	MV Agusta	18	+21.159	17	
18	77	(Switzerland) Dominique Aegerter	MV Agusta	18	+22.746	20	
19	72	(Italy) Marco Bezzecchi	KTM	18	+23.366	24	
20	11	(Italy) Nicolò Bulega	Kalex	18	+23.707	11	
21	64	(Netherlands) Bo Bendsneyder	NTS	18	+23.906	21	
22	16	(United States) Joe Roberts	KTM	18	+28.918	31	
23	96	(United Kingdom) Jake Dixon	KTM	18	+31.491	23	
24	65	(Germany) Philipp Öttl	KTM	18	+40.541	25	
25	4	(South Africa) Steven Odendaal	NTS	18	+47.477	27	
26	3	(Germany) Lukas Tulovic	KTM	18	+53.613	26	
27	18	(Andorra) Xavi Cardelús	KTM	18	+57.669	30	
28	19	(Japan) Teppei Nagoe	Kalex	18	+59.780	29	
Ret	22	(United Kingdom) Sam Lowes	Kalex	17	Accident	9	
Ret	38	(United Kingdom) Bradley Smith	Kalex	8	Accident	28 (Note: 3-place grid penalty.)	
Ret	73	(Spain) Álex Márquez	Kalex	5	Accident	1	
DNS	33	(Italy) Enea Bastianini	Kalex		Did not start		
OFFICIAL MOTO2 REPORT

- Enea Bastianini withdrew from the event due to foot pain from a crash at the previous round in Austria.

=== Moto3 ===
Pos.	No.	Rider	Manufacturer	Laps	Time/Retired	Grid	Points
1	42	(Spain) Marcos Ramírez	Honda	17	37:50.443	9	25
2	14	(Italy) Tony Arbolino	Honda	17	+0.240	1	20
3	48	(Italy) Lorenzo Dalla Porta	Honda	17	+0.374	2	16
4	23	(Italy) Niccolò Antonelli	Honda	17	+0.425	5	13
5	24	(Japan) Tatsuki Suzuki	Honda	17	+0.495	11	11
6	71	(Japan) Ayumu Sasaki	Honda	17	+0.816	4	10
7	17	(United Kingdom) John McPhee	Honda	17	+1.045	6	9
8	7	(Italy) Dennis Foggia	KTM	17	+1.210	20	8
9	13	(Italy) Celestino Vietti	KTM	17	+1.235	7	7
10	79	(Japan) Ai Ogura	Honda	17	+1.300	8	6
11	5	(Spain) Jaume Masiá	KTM	17	+1.921	13	5
12	40	(South Africa) Darryn Binder	KTM	17	+7.341	17	4
13	44	(Spain) Arón Canet	KTM	17	+12.318	12	3
14	52	(Spain) Jeremy Alcoba	Honda	17	+12.620	22	2
15	21	(Spain) Alonso López	Honda	17	+12.861	21	1
16	84	(Czech Republic) Jakub Kornfeil	KTM	17	+13.034	29	
17	16	(Italy) Andrea Migno	KTM	17	+13.114	15	
18	25	(Spain) Raúl Fernández	KTM	17	+13.531	3	
19	11	(Spain) Sergio García	Honda	17	+13.752	10	
20	27	(Japan) Kaito Toba	Honda	17	+13.934	18	
21	12	(Czech Republic) Filip Salač	KTM	17	+14.028	24	
22	82	(Italy) Stefano Nepa	KTM	17	+14.086	23	
23	76	(Kazakhstan) Makar Yurchenko	KTM	17	+14.362 (Note: 2-second penalty for exceeding track limits.)	19	
24	61	(Turkey) Can Öncü	KTM	17	+27.836	25	
25	69	(United Kingdom) Tom Booth-Amos	KTM	17	+30.556	31	
26	22	(Japan) Kazuki Masaki	KTM	17	+30.706	26	
27	54	(Italy) Riccardo Rossi	Honda	17	+30.746	27	
28	73	(Austria) Maximilian Kofler	KTM	17	+53.880	28	
29	96	(United States) Brandon Paasch	KTM	17	+1:03.928	30	
Ret	55	(Italy) Romano Fenati	Honda	9	Accident	14	
Ret	75	(Spain) Albert Arenas	KTM	4	Collision Damage	16	
OFFICIAL MOTO3 REPORT

== Championship standings after the race ==
=== MotoGP ===
Pos.	Rider	Points
1	(Spain) Marc Márquez	250
2	(Italy) Andrea Dovizioso	172
3	(Spain) Álex Rins	149
4	(Italy) Danilo Petrucci	145
5	(Spain) Maverick Viñales	118
6	(Italy) Valentino Rossi	116
7	(Australia) Jack Miller	94
8	(France) Fabio Quartararo	92
9	(United Kingdom) Cal Crutchlow	88
10	(Italy) Franco Morbidelli	69

=== Moto2 ===
Pos.	Rider	Points
1	(Spain) Álex Márquez	181
2	(Spain) Augusto Fernández	146
3	(Switzerland) Thomas Lüthi	146
4	(Spain) Jorge Navarro	146
5	(South Africa) Brad Binder	125
6	(Italy) Lorenzo Baldassarri	124
7	(Germany) Marcel Schrötter	116
8	(Italy) Luca Marini	108
9	(Italy) Enea Bastianini	74
10	(Italy) Fabio Di Giannantonio	69

=== Moto3 ===
Pos.	Rider	Points
1	(Italy) Lorenzo Dalla Porta	171
2	(Spain) Arón Canet	157
3	(Italy) Tony Arbolino	133
4	(Italy) Niccolò Antonelli	118
5	(Spain) Marcos Ramírez	114
6	(United Kingdom) John McPhee	93
7	(Italy) Celestino Vietti	88
8	(Spain) Jaume Masiá	83
9	(Italy) Romano Fenati	67
10	(Czech Republic) Jakub Kornfeil	67

== Notes ==
Previous race: 2019 Austrian Grand Prix	FIM Grand Prix World Championship; 2019 season	Next race: 2019 San Marino Grand Prix
Previous race: 2018 British Grand Prix	British motorcycle Grand Prix	Next race: 2021 British Grand Prix
