= 2019 Japanese motorcycle Grand Prix =

(Japan) 2019 Japanese Grand Prix
Race details
- Race 16 of 19 races in the 2019 Grand Prix motorcycle racing season
- Date: 20 October 2019
- Official name: Motul Grand Prix of Japan
- Location: Twin Ring Motegi, Motegi, Japan
- Course: Permanent racing facility; 4.801 km (2.983 mi)

MotoGP
Pole position
Rider	(Spain) Marc Márquez	Honda
Time	1:45.763	
Fastest lap
Rider	(Spain) Marc Márquez	Honda
Time	1:45.766 on lap 5	
Podium
First	(Spain) Marc Márquez	Honda
Second	(France) Fabio Quartararo	Yamaha
Third	(Italy) Andrea Dovizioso	Ducati

Moto2
Pole position
Rider	(Italy) Luca Marini	Kalex
Time	2:00.985	
Fastest lap
Rider	(Spain) Jorge Martín	KTM
Time	1:50.834 on lap 19	
Podium
First	(Italy) Luca Marini	Kalex
Second	(Switzerland) Thomas Lüthi	Kalex
Third	(Spain) Jorge Martín	KTM

Moto3
Pole position
Rider	(Italy) Niccolò Antonelli	Honda
Time	2:09.293	
Fastest lap
Rider	(Italy) Lorenzo Dalla Porta	Honda
Time	1:57.790 on lap 6	
Podium
First	(Italy) Lorenzo Dalla Porta	Honda
Second	(Spain) Albert Arenas	KTM
Third	(Italy) Celestino Vietti	KTM

The 2019 Japanese motorcycle Grand Prix was the sixteenth round of the 2019 MotoGP season. It was held at the Twin Ring Motegi in Motegi on 20 October 2019.

== Classification ==
=== MotoGP ===
Pos.	No.	Rider	Team	Manufacturer	Laps	Time/Retired	Grid	Points
1	93	(Spain) Marc Márquez	Repsol Honda Team	Honda	24	42:41.492	1	25
2	20	(France) Fabio Quartararo	Petronas Yamaha SRT	Yamaha	24	+0.870	3	20
3	4	(Italy) Andrea Dovizioso	Ducati Team	Ducati	24	+1.325	7	16
4	12	(Spain) Maverick Viñales	Monster Energy Yamaha MotoGP	Yamaha	24	+2.608	4	13
5	35	(United Kingdom) Cal Crutchlow	LCR Honda Castrol	Honda	24	+9.140	5	11
6	21	(Italy) Franco Morbidelli	Petronas Yamaha SRT	Yamaha	24	+9.187	2	10
7	42	(Spain) Álex Rins	Team Suzuki Ecstar	Suzuki	24	+9.306	11	9
8	36	(Spain) Joan Mir	Team Suzuki Ecstar	Suzuki	24	+10.695	12	8
9	9	(Italy) Danilo Petrucci	Ducati Team	Ducati	24	+14.216	8	7
10	43	(Australia) Jack Miller	Pramac Racing	Ducati	24	+18.909	6	6
11	44	(Spain) Pol Espargaró	Red Bull KTM Factory Racing	KTM	24	+25.554	15	5
12	88	(Portugal) Miguel Oliveira	Red Bull KTM Tech3	KTM	24	+27.870	16	4
13	63	(Italy) Francesco Bagnaia	Pramac Racing	Ducati	24	+29.983	14	3
14	82	(Finland) Mika Kallio	Red Bull KTM Factory Racing	KTM	24	+31.232	17	2
15	41	(Spain) Aleix Espargaró	Aprilia Racing Team Gresini	Aprilia	24	+32.546	9	1
16	30	(Japan) Takaaki Nakagami	LCR Honda Idemitsu	Honda	24	+37.482	13	
17	99	(Spain) Jorge Lorenzo	Repsol Honda Team	Honda	24	+40.410	19	
18	17	(Czech Republic) Karel Abraham	Reale Avintia Racing	Ducati	24	+43.458	18	
19	55	(Malaysia) Hafizh Syahrin	Red Bull KTM Tech3	KTM	24	+46.206	20	
20	50	(France) Sylvain Guintoli	Team Suzuki Ecstar	Suzuki	24	+50.235	21	
Ret	46	(Italy) Valentino Rossi	Monster Energy Yamaha MotoGP	Yamaha	20	Accident	10	
Ret	29	(Italy) Andrea Iannone	Aprilia Racing Team Gresini	Aprilia	7	Accident	22	
DNS	53	(Spain) Tito Rabat	Reale Avintia Racing	Ducati		Did not start		
Sources:

- Tito Rabat developed a vascular problem in his hand during practice and withdrew from the event.

=== Moto2 ===
Pos.	No.	Rider	Manufacturer	Laps	Time/Retired	Grid	Points
1	10	(Italy) Luca Marini	Kalex	22	40:57.279	1	25
2	12	(Switzerland) Thomas Lüthi	Kalex	22	+0.560	7	20
3	88	(Spain) Jorge Martín	KTM	22	+3.593	14	16
4	7	(Italy) Lorenzo Baldassarri	Kalex	22	+3.999	3	13
5	9	(Spain) Jorge Navarro	Speed Up	22	+5.236	5	11
6	73	(Spain) Álex Márquez	Kalex	22	+7.345	4	10
7	33	(Italy) Enea Bastianini	Kalex	22	+8.115	12	9
8	40	(Spain) Augusto Fernández	Kalex	22	+10.460	2	8
9	23	(Germany) Marcel Schrötter	Kalex	22	+10.711	9	7
10	62	(Italy) Stefano Manzi	MV Agusta	22	+12.445	11	6
11	21	(Italy) Fabio Di Giannantonio	Speed Up	22	+12.572	21	5
12	41	(South Africa) Brad Binder	KTM	22	+14.864	18	4
13	35	(Thailand) Somkiat Chantra	Kalex	22	+15.008	6	3
14	77	(Switzerland) Dominique Aegerter	MV Agusta	22	+15.778	28	2
15	5	(Italy) Andrea Locatelli	Kalex	22	+23.595	19	1
16	64	(Netherlands) Bo Bendsneyder	NTS	22	+27.307	27	
17	96	(United Kingdom) Jake Dixon	KTM	22	+30.304	32	
18	16	(United States) Joe Roberts	KTM	22	+33.806	24	
19	2	(Switzerland) Jesko Raffin	NTS	22	+36.962	22	
20	65	(Germany) Philipp Öttl	KTM	22	+43.682	29	
21	20	(Indonesia) Dimas Ekky Pratama	Kalex	22	+45.143	25	
22	47	(Malaysia) Adam Norrodin	Kalex	22	+59.459	31	
23	18	(Andorra) Xavi Cardelús	KTM	22	+1:14.661	30	
Ret	54	(Italy) Mattia Pasini	Kalex	17	Accident Damage	23	
Ret	72	(Italy) Marco Bezzecchi	KTM	12	Illness	8	
Ret	87	(Australia) Remy Gardner	Kalex	8	Accident	10	
Ret	27	(Spain) Iker Lecuona	KTM	4	Accident	13	
Ret	97	(Spain) Xavi Vierge	Kalex	4	Accident	20	
Ret	22	(United Kingdom) Sam Lowes	Kalex	2	Broken Handlebar	15	
Ret	11	(Italy) Nicolò Bulega	Kalex	1	Accident	17	
Ret	3	(Germany) Lukas Tulovic	KTM	1	Accident Damage	26	
Ret	45	(Japan) Tetsuta Nagashima	Kalex	0	Accident	16	
OFFICIAL MOTO2 REPORT

=== Moto3 ===
Pos.	No.	Rider	Manufacturer	Laps	Time/Retired	Grid	Points
1	48	(Italy) Lorenzo Dalla Porta	Honda	20	39:34.866	6	25
2	75	(Spain) Albert Arenas	KTM	20	+0.094	13	20
3	13	(Italy) Celestino Vietti	KTM	20	+0.198	9	16
4	24	(Japan) Tatsuki Suzuki	Honda	20	+0.289	3	13
5	11	(Spain) Sergio García	Honda	20	+0.437	5	11
6	17	(United Kingdom) John McPhee	Honda	20	+3.648	11	10
7	5	(Spain) Jaume Masiá	KTM	20	+7.225	18	9
8	42	(Spain) Marcos Ramírez	Honda	20	+7.382	12	8
9	21	(Spain) Alonso López	Honda	20	+8.172	2	7
10	16	(Italy) Andrea Migno	KTM	20	+12.054	21 (Note: 6-place grid penalty.)	6
11	76	(Kazakhstan) Makar Yurchenko	KTM	20	+12.296	4	5
12	23	(Italy) Niccolò Antonelli	Honda	20	+13.295	1	4
13	71	(Japan) Ayumu Sasaki	Honda	20	+13.308	16	3
14	79	(Japan) Ai Ogura	Honda	20	+13.333	17	2
15	6	(Japan) Ryusei Yamanaka	Honda	20	+13.362	19	1
16	82	(Italy) Stefano Nepa	KTM	20	+13.380	20	
17	27	(Japan) Kaito Toba	Honda	20	+13.487	15	
18	61	(Turkey) Can Öncü	KTM	20	+13.940	23	
19	25	(Spain) Raúl Fernández	KTM	20	+14.648	26	
20	22	(Japan) Kazuki Masaki	KTM	20	+22.886	24	
21	54	(Italy) Riccardo Rossi	Honda	20	+22.907	25	
22	12	(Czech Republic) Filip Salač	KTM	20	+23.416	30 (Note: Pit lane start penalty.)	
23	7	(Italy) Dennis Foggia	KTM	20	+32.728	29	
24	69	(United Kingdom) Tom Booth-Amos	KTM	16	+4 laps	28	
Ret	55	(Italy) Romano Fenati	Honda	15	Mechanical	22	
Ret	44	(Spain) Arón Canet	KTM	14	Accident Damage	8	
Ret	14	(Italy) Tony Arbolino	Honda	9	Accident	27	
Ret	40	(South Africa) Darryn Binder	KTM	7	Accident Damage	14	
Ret	84	(Czech Republic) Jakub Kornfeil	KTM	0	Accident	7	
Ret	19	(Argentina) Gabriel Rodrigo	Honda	0	Accident	10	
DNQ	36	(Japan) Sho Hasegawa	Honda		Did not qualify		
OFFICIAL MOTO3 REPORT

== Championship standings after the race ==
=== MotoGP ===
Pos.	Rider	Points
1	(Spain) Marc Márquez	350
2	(Italy) Andrea Dovizioso	231
3	(Spain) Álex Rins	176
4	(Spain) Maverick Viñales	176
5	(Italy) Danilo Petrucci	169
6	(France) Fabio Quartararo	163
7	(Italy) Valentino Rossi	145
8	(Australia) Jack Miller	125
9	(United Kingdom) Cal Crutchlow	113
10	(Italy) Franco Morbidelli	100

=== Moto2 ===
Pos.	Rider	Points
1	(Spain) Álex Márquez	234
2	(Switzerland) Thomas Lüthi	198
3	(Spain) Augusto Fernández	192
4	(Spain) Jorge Navarro	186
5	(South Africa) Brad Binder	184
6	(Italy) Luca Marini	176
7	(Italy) Lorenzo Baldassarri	151
8	(Germany) Marcel Schrötter	125
9	(Italy) Fabio Di Giannantonio	99
10	(Italy) Enea Bastianini	95

=== Moto3 ===
Pos.	Rider	Points
1	(Italy) Lorenzo Dalla Porta	229
2	(Spain) Arón Canet	182
3	(Italy) Tony Arbolino	161
4	(Spain) Marcos Ramírez	144
5	(United Kingdom) John McPhee	136
6	(Italy) Niccolò Antonelli	122
7	(Italy) Celestino Vietti	116
8	(Spain) Jaume Masiá	105
9	(Japan) Tatsuki Suzuki	98
10	(Italy) Dennis Foggia	92

== Notes ==
Previous race: 2019 Thailand Grand Prix	FIM Grand Prix World Championship; 2019 season	Next race: 2019 Australian Grand Prix
Previous race: 2018 Japanese Grand Prix	Japanese motorcycle Grand Prix	Next race: 2022 Japanese Grand Prix
