= 2019 Malaysian motorcycle Grand Prix =

(Malaysia) 2019 Malaysian Grand Prix
Race details
- Race 18 of 19 races in the 2019 Grand Prix motorcycle racing season
- Date: 3 November 2019
- Official name: Shell Malaysia Motorcycle Grand Prix
- Location: Sepang International Circuit, Sepang, Selangor, Malaysia
- Course: Permanent racing facility; 5.543 km (3.444 mi)

MotoGP
Pole position
Rider	(France) Fabio Quartararo	Yamaha
Time	1:58.303	
Fastest lap
Rider	(Italy) Valentino Rossi	Yamaha
Time	1:59.661 on lap 3	
Podium
First	(Spain) Maverick Viñales	Yamaha
Second	(Spain) Marc Márquez	Honda
Third	(Italy) Andrea Dovizioso	Ducati

Moto2
Pole position
Rider	(Spain) Álex Márquez	Kalex
Time	2:05.244	
Fastest lap
Rider	(Spain) Álex Márquez	Kalex
Time	2:05.860 on lap 2	
Podium
First	(South Africa) Brad Binder	KTM
Second	(Spain) Álex Márquez	Kalex
Third	(Switzerland) Thomas Lüthi	Kalex

Moto3
Pole position
Rider	(Spain) Marcos Ramírez	Honda
Time	2:11.758	
Fastest lap
Rider	(Spain) Marcos Ramírez	Honda
Time	2:12.845 on lap 3	
Podium
First	(Italy) Lorenzo Dalla Porta	Honda
Second	(Spain) Sergio García	Honda
Third	(Spain) Jaume Masiá	KTM

The 2019 Malaysian motorcycle Grand Prix was the eighteenth round of the 2019 MotoGP season. It was held at the Sepang International Circuit in Sepang on 3 November 2019. Álex Márquez won the Moto2 title after finishing in 2nd place behind his closest title rival Brad Binder. Despite taking his fourth win of the season and the second consecutive win after winning the previous round at Phillip Island seven days ago, Márquez' 2nd place-finish was enough to mathematically eliminate Binder's hopes of winning his second title overall in his career after previously winning the 2016 Moto3 World Championship due to an uncatchable margin of Márquez by 28 points over Binder with one race to go.

It was instead Márquez' second championship title overall after winning the 2014 Moto3 World Championship. This day also marked the second time in the history of the sport, that both Márquez brothers claimed championships in the same year in their respective classes with Marc Márquez previously winning his 6th premier class title and the 4th consecutive title in Buriram.

== Classification ==
=== MotoGP ===
Pos.	No.	Rider	Team	Manufacturer	Laps	Time/Retired	Grid	Points
1	12	(Spain) Maverick Viñales	Monster Energy Yamaha MotoGP	Yamaha	20	40:14.632	2	25
2	93	(Spain) Marc Márquez	Repsol Honda Team	Honda	20	+3.059	11	20
3	4	(Italy) Andrea Dovizioso	Ducati Team	Ducati	20	+5.611	10	16
4	46	(Italy) Valentino Rossi	Monster Energy Yamaha MotoGP	Yamaha	20	+5.965	6	13
5	42	(Spain) Álex Rins	Team Suzuki Ecstar	Suzuki	20	+6.350	7	11
6	21	(Italy) Franco Morbidelli	Petronas Yamaha SRT	Yamaha	20	+9.993	3	10
7	20	(France) Fabio Quartararo	Petronas Yamaha SRT	Yamaha	20	+12.864	1	9
8	43	(Australia) Jack Miller	Pramac Racing	Ducati	20	+17.252	4	8
9	9	(Italy) Danilo Petrucci	Ducati Team	Ducati	20	+19.773	8	7
10	36	(Spain) Joan Mir	Team Suzuki Ecstar	Suzuki	20	+22.854	13	6
11	44	(Spain) Pol Espargaró	Red Bull KTM Factory Racing	KTM	20	+24.821	15	5
12	63	(Italy) Francesco Bagnaia	Pramac Racing	Ducati	20	+30.251	12	4
13	41	(Spain) Aleix Espargaró	Aprilia Racing Team Gresini	Aprilia	20	+30.447	14	3
14	99	(Spain) Jorge Lorenzo	Repsol Honda Team	Honda	20	+34.215	18	2
15	82	(Finland) Mika Kallio	Red Bull KTM Factory Racing	KTM	20	+34.461	19	1
16	55	(Malaysia) Hafizh Syahrin	Red Bull KTM Tech3	KTM	20	+44.319	20	
17	17	(Czech Republic) Karel Abraham	Reale Avintia Racing	Ducati	20	+47.343	16	
Ret	5	(France) Johann Zarco	LCR Honda Idemitsu	Honda	16	Accident	9	
Ret	35	(United Kingdom) Cal Crutchlow	LCR Honda Castrol	Honda	14	Accident	5	
DSQ (Ret)	29	(Italy) Andrea Iannone	Aprilia Racing Team Gresini	Aprilia	11	Accident	17	
DNS	88	(Portugal) Miguel Oliveira	Red Bull KTM Tech3	KTM		Did not start		
Sources:

- Miguel Oliveira withdrew from the event after Friday practice due to shoulder injury suffered at the previous round in Australia.
- Andrea Iannone was retroactively disqualified on 31 March 2020 as part of his suspension for a failed doping test after the Malaysian Grand Prix.

=== Moto2 ===
Pos.	No.	Rider	Manufacturer	Laps	Time/Retired	Grid	Points
1	41	(South Africa) Brad Binder	KTM	18	38:07.843	3	25
2	73	(Spain) Álex Márquez	Kalex	18	+0.758	1	20
3	12	(Switzerland) Thomas Lüthi	Kalex	18	+2.683	5	16
4	97	(Spain) Xavi Vierge	Kalex	18	+6.646	4	13
5	9	(Spain) Jorge Navarro	Speed Up	18	+7.114	15	11
6	27	(Spain) Iker Lecuona	KTM	18	+8.582	12	10
7	7	(Italy) Lorenzo Baldassarri	Kalex	18	+9.232	22	9
8	45	(Japan) Tetsuta Nagashima	Kalex	18	+10.180	2	8
9	23	(Germany) Marcel Schrötter	Kalex	18	+10.807	8	7
10	10	(Italy) Luca Marini	Kalex	18	+14.585	10	6
11	40	(Spain) Augusto Fernández	Kalex	18	+16.521	17	5
12	11	(Italy) Nicolò Bulega	Kalex	18	+22.333	18	4
13	54	(Italy) Mattia Pasini	Kalex	18	+23.326	26	3
14	87	(Australia) Remy Gardner	Kalex	18	+23.810	9	2
15	77	(Switzerland) Dominique Aegerter	MV Agusta	18	+24.002	24	1
16	5	(Italy) Andrea Locatelli	Kalex	18	+24.055	19	
17	96	(United Kingdom) Jake Dixon	KTM	18	+27.663	28	
18	20	(Indonesia) Dimas Ekky Pratama	Kalex	18	+29.455	27	
19	16	(United States) Joe Roberts	KTM	18	+30.896	25	
20	2	(Switzerland) Jesko Raffin	NTS	18	+37.044	16	
21	65	(Germany) Philipp Öttl	KTM	18	+50.548	29	
22	3	(Germany) Lukas Tulovic	KTM	18	+54.921	30	
23	18	(Andorra) Xavi Cardelús	KTM	18	+1:00.678	32	
24	33	(Italy) Enea Bastianini	Kalex	17	+1 lap	14	
Ret	22	(United Kingdom) Sam Lowes	Kalex	13	Accident	7	
Ret	72	(Italy) Marco Bezzecchi	KTM	12	Accident	20	
Ret	62	(Italy) Stefano Manzi	MV Agusta	10	Accident Damage	13	
Ret	35	(Thailand) Somkiat Chantra	Kalex	8	Accident Damage	21 (Note: 3-place grid penalty.)	
Ret	21	(Italy) Fabio Di Giannantonio	Speed Up	7	Accident Damage	11	
Ret	47	(Malaysia) Adam Norrodin	Kalex	5	Accident	31	
Ret	88	(Spain) Jorge Martín	KTM	2	Accident	6	
Ret	64	(Netherlands) Bo Bendsneyder	NTS	0	Accident	23	
OFFICIAL MOTO2 REPORT

=== Moto3 ===
Pos.	No.	Rider	Manufacturer	Laps	Time/Retired	Grid	Points
1	48	(Italy) Lorenzo Dalla Porta	Honda	17	38:01.355	7	25
2	11	(Spain) Sergio García	Honda	17	+0.410	13	20
3	5	(Spain) Jaume Masiá	KTM	17	+0.803	11	16
4	79	(Japan) Ai Ogura	Honda	17	+0.885	14	13
5	13	(Italy) Celestino Vietti	KTM	17	+0.902	5	11
6	42	(Spain) Marcos Ramírez	Honda	17	+1.095	1	10
7	17	(United Kingdom) John McPhee	Honda	17	+1.342	3	9
8	44	(Spain) Arón Canet	KTM	17	+2.253	12	8
9	14	(Italy) Tony Arbolino	Honda	17	+3.035	19	7
10	23	(Italy) Niccolò Antonelli	Honda	17	+7.726	18	6
11	55	(Italy) Romano Fenati	Honda	17	+8.008	21	5
12	75	(Spain) Albert Arenas	KTM	17	+10.521	4	4
13	12	(Czech Republic) Filip Salač	KTM	17	+15.542	26	3
14	25	(Spain) Raúl Fernández	KTM	17	+15.873	20	2
15	54	(Italy) Riccardo Rossi	Honda	17	+15.950	29	1
16	76	(Kazakhstan) Makar Yurchenko	KTM	17	+16.064	28	
17	84	(Czech Republic) Jakub Kornfeil	KTM	17	+16.497	27	
18	22	(Japan) Kazuki Masaki	KTM	17	+16.567	23	
19	7	(Italy) Dennis Foggia	KTM	17	+24.161	22	
20	61	(Turkey) Can Öncü	KTM	17	+29.330	16	
21	69	(United Kingdom) Tom Booth-Amos	KTM	17	+1:22.202	25	
Ret	40	(South Africa) Darryn Binder	KTM	10	Accident Damage	6	
Ret	71	(Japan) Ayumu Sasaki	Honda	8	Accident	8	
Ret	16	(Italy) Andrea Migno	KTM	8	Accident	15	
Ret	27	(Japan) Kaito Toba	Honda	8	Accident	17	
Ret	82	(Italy) Stefano Nepa	KTM	7	Accident Damage	24	
Ret	24	(Japan) Tatsuki Suzuki	Honda	5	Accident	2	
Ret	19	(Argentina) Gabriel Rodrigo	Honda	5	Accident	9	
Ret	21	(Spain) Alonso López	Honda	5	Accident	10	
OFFICIAL MOTO3 REPORT

== Championship standings after the race ==
=== MotoGP ===
Pos.	Rider	Points
1	(Spain) Marc Márquez	395
2	(Italy) Andrea Dovizioso	256
3	(Spain) Maverick Viñales	201
4	(Spain) Álex Rins	194
5	(Italy) Danilo Petrucci	176
6	(France) Fabio Quartararo	172
7	(Italy) Valentino Rossi	166
8	(Australia) Jack Miller	149
9	(United Kingdom) Cal Crutchlow	133
10	(Italy) Franco Morbidelli	115

=== Moto2 ===
Pos.	Rider	Points
1	(Spain) Álex Márquez	262
2	(South Africa) Brad Binder	234
3	(Switzerland) Thomas Lüthi	230
4	(Spain) Jorge Navarro	210
5	(Spain) Augusto Fernández	197
6	(Italy) Luca Marini	182
7	(Italy) Lorenzo Baldassarri	171
8	(Germany) Marcel Schrötter	137
9	(Italy) Fabio Di Giannantonio	101
10	(Italy) Enea Bastianini	95

=== Moto3 ===
Pos.	Rider	Points
1	(Italy) Lorenzo Dalla Porta	279
2	(Spain) Arón Canet	190
3	(Italy) Tony Arbolino	175
4	(Spain) Marcos Ramírez	174
5	(United Kingdom) John McPhee	156
6	(Italy) Niccolò Antonelli	128
7	(Italy) Celestino Vietti	127
8	(Spain) Jaume Masiá	121
9	(Japan) Tatsuki Suzuki	111
10	(Spain) Albert Arenas	108

== Notes ==
Previous race: 2019 Australian Grand Prix	FIM Grand Prix World Championship; 2019 season	Next race: 2019 Valencian Grand Prix
Previous race: 2018 Malaysian Grand Prix	Malaysian motorcycle Grand Prix	Next race: 2022 Malaysian Grand Prix
