= 2019 Aragon motorcycle Grand Prix =

14th round of the 2019 MotoGP

2019 Aragon Grand Prix
Race details
- Race 14 of 19 races in the 2019 Grand Prix motorcycle racing season
- Date: 22 September 2019
- Official name: Gran Premio Michelin de Aragón
- Location: MotorLand Aragón, Alcañiz, Spain
- Course: Permanent racing facility; 5.077 km (3.155 mi)

MotoGP
Pole position
Rider	(Spain) Marc Márquez	Honda
Time	1:47.009	
Fastest lap
Rider	(Spain) Marc Márquez	Honda
Time	1:48.330 on lap 2	
Podium
First	(Spain) Marc Márquez	Honda
Second	(Italy) Andrea Dovizioso	Ducati
Third	(Australia) Jack Miller	Ducati

Moto2
Pole position
Rider	(Spain) Álex Márquez	Kalex
Time	1:52.225	
Fastest lap
Rider	(Spain) Jorge Navarro	Speed Up
Time	1:52.925 on lap 3	
Podium
First	(South Africa) Brad Binder	KTM
Second	(Spain) Jorge Navarro	Speed Up
Third	(Spain) Álex Márquez	Kalex

Moto3
Pole position
Rider	(Spain) Arón Canet	KTM
Time	1:58.197	
Fastest lap
Rider	(South Africa) Darryn Binder	KTM
Time	1:59.057 on lap 4	
Podium
First	(Spain) Arón Canet	KTM
Second	(Japan) Ai Ogura	Honda
Third	(Italy) Dennis Foggia	KTM

The 2019 Aragon motorcycle Grand Prix was the fourteenth round of the 2019 MotoGP season. It was held at the MotorLand Aragón in Alcañiz on 22 September 2019.

== Classification ==
=== MotoGP ===
Pos.	No.	Rider	Team	Manufacturer	Laps	Time/Retired	Grid	Points
1	93	(Spain) Marc Márquez	Repsol Honda Team	Honda	23	41:57.221	1	25
2	4	(Italy) Andrea Dovizioso	Ducati Team	Ducati	23	+4.836	10	20
3	43	(Australia) Jack Miller	Pramac Racing	Ducati	23	+5.430	4	16
4	12	(Spain) Maverick Viñales	Monster Energy Yamaha MotoGP	Yamaha	23	+5.811	3	13
5	20	(France) Fabio Quartararo	Petronas Yamaha SRT	Yamaha	23	+8.924	2	11
6	35	(United Kingdom) Cal Crutchlow	LCR Honda Castrol	Honda	23	+10.390	7	10
7	41	(Spain) Aleix Espargaró	Aprilia Racing Team Gresini	Aprilia	23	+10.441	5	9
8	46	(Italy) Valentino Rossi	Monster Energy Yamaha MotoGP	Yamaha	23	+23.623	6	8
9	42	(Spain) Álex Rins	Team Suzuki Ecstar	Suzuki	23	+27.998	12	7
10	30	(Japan) Takaaki Nakagami	LCR Honda Idemitsu	Honda	23	+31.242	13	6
11	29	(Italy) Andrea Iannone	Aprilia Racing Team Gresini	Aprilia	23	+32.624	11	5
12	9	(Italy) Danilo Petrucci	Ducati Team	Ducati	23	+33.043	14	4
13	88	(Portugal) Miguel Oliveira	Red Bull KTM Tech3	KTM	23	+33.063	16	3
14	36	(Spain) Joan Mir	Team Suzuki Ecstar	Suzuki	23	+33.363	9	2
15	53	(Spain) Tito Rabat	Reale Avintia Racing	Ducati	23	+36.358	17	1
16	63	(Italy) Francesco Bagnaia	Pramac Racing	Ducati	23	+41.295	15	
17	82	(Finland) Mika Kallio	Red Bull KTM Factory Racing	KTM	23	+42.983	18	
18	17	(Czech Republic) Karel Abraham	Reale Avintia Racing	Ducati	23	+43.880	21	
19	38	(United Kingdom) Bradley Smith	Aprilia Racing Team	Aprilia	23	+44.279	22	
20	99	(Spain) Jorge Lorenzo	Repsol Honda Team	Honda	23	+46.087	19	
21	55	(Malaysia) Hafizh Syahrin	Red Bull KTM Tech3	KTM	23	+47.308	20	
Ret	21	(Italy) Franco Morbidelli	Petronas Yamaha SRT	Yamaha	0	Accident	8	
DNS	44	(Spain) Pol Espargaró	Red Bull KTM Factory Racing	KTM		Did not start		
Sources:

- Pol Espargaró suffered a broken left wrist in a crash during practice and withdrew from the event.

=== Moto2 ===
Pos.	No.	Rider	Manufacturer	Laps	Time/Retired	Grid	Points
1	41	(South Africa) Brad Binder	KTM	21	39:45.177	3	25
2	9	(Spain) Jorge Navarro	Speed Up	21	+0.787	6	20
3	73	(Spain) Álex Márquez	Kalex	21	+2.876	1	16
4	10	(Italy) Luca Marini	Kalex	21	+5.387	4	13
5	22	(United Kingdom) Sam Lowes	Kalex	21	+5.601	9	11
6	12	(Switzerland) Thomas Lüthi	Kalex	21	+9.695	5	10
7	27	(Spain) Iker Lecuona	KTM	21	+11.650	10	9
8	7	(Italy) Lorenzo Baldassarri	Kalex	21	+12.546	11	8
9	88	(Spain) Jorge Martín	KTM	21	+14.775	14	7
10	97	(Spain) Xavi Vierge	Kalex	21	+15.393	7	6
11	21	(Italy) Fabio Di Giannantonio	Speed Up	21	+15.495	12	5
12	11	(Italy) Nicolò Bulega	Kalex	21	+15.625	8	4
13	87	(Australia) Remy Gardner	Kalex	21	+15.859	13	3
14	62	(Italy) Stefano Manzi	MV Agusta	21	+21.838	19	2
15	72	(Italy) Marco Bezzecchi	KTM	21	+21.859	16	1
16	35	(Thailand) Somkiat Chantra	Kalex	21	+22.659	18	
17	5	(Italy) Andrea Locatelli	Kalex	21	+25.897	15	
18	64	(Netherlands) Bo Bendsneyder	NTS	21	+28.609	21	
19	77	(Switzerland) Dominique Aegerter	MV Agusta	21	+28.943	24	
20 (Note: 1-position penalty for exceeding track limits on the last lap.)	2	(Switzerland) Jesko Raffin	Kalex	21	+28.679	22	
21	24	(Italy) Simone Corsi	NTS	21	+37.526	26	
22	40	(Spain) Augusto Fernández	Kalex	21	+41.050	2	
23	96	(United Kingdom) Jake Dixon	KTM	21	+42.644	25	
24	33	(Italy) Enea Bastianini	Kalex	21	+45.942	20	
25	3	(Germany) Lukas Tulovic	KTM	21	+50.680	28	
26	65	(Germany) Philipp Öttl	KTM	21	+52.367	27	
27	18	(Andorra) Xavi Cardelús	KTM	21	+1:09.114	29	
28	6	(Italy) Gabriele Ruiu	Kalex	21	+1:16.241	31	
29	31	(Indonesia) Gerry Salim	Kalex	21	+1:16.381	30	
30	16	(United States) Joe Roberts	KTM	21	+1:18.820	23	
Ret	45	(Japan) Tetsuta Nagashima	Kalex	6	Accident	17	
DNS	47	(Malaysia) Adam Norrodin	Kalex		Did not start		
OFFICIAL MOTO2 REPORT

- Adam Norrodin suffered a shoulder injury in a crash during practice and withdrew from the event.

=== Moto3 ===
Pos.	No.	Rider	Manufacturer	Laps	Time/Retired	Grid	Points
1	44	(Spain) Arón Canet	KTM	19	38:01.916	1	25
2	79	(Japan) Ai Ogura	Honda	19	+4.581	2	20
3	7	(Italy) Dennis Foggia	KTM	19	+4.663	11	16
4	17	(United Kingdom) John McPhee	Honda	19	+4.729	9	13
5	21	(Spain) Alonso López	Honda	19	+4.842	6	11
6	24	(Japan) Tatsuki Suzuki	Honda	19	+4.947	8	10
7	11	(Spain) Sergio García	Honda	19	+5.085	29	9
8	75	(Spain) Albert Arenas	KTM	19	+5.483	13	8
9	19	(Argentina) Gabriel Rodrigo	Honda	19	+5.773	14	7
10	14	(Italy) Tony Arbolino	Honda	19	+8.812	7	6
11	48	(Italy) Lorenzo Dalla Porta	Honda	19	+8.579	12	5
12	99	(Spain) Carlos Tatay	KTM	19	+8.900	3	4
13	71	(Japan) Ayumu Sasaki	Honda	19	+8.905	10	3
14	13	(Italy) Celestino Vietti	KTM	19	+8.970	5	2
15	84	(Czech Republic) Jakub Kornfeil	KTM	19	+9.197	4	1
16	16	(Italy) Andrea Migno	KTM	19	+13.455	17	
17	40	(South Africa) Darryn Binder	KTM	19	+13.551	27	
18	12	(Czech Republic) Filip Salač	KTM	19	+13.561	16	
19	67	(Spain) Gerard Riu	KTM	19	+13.790	24	
20	10	(Spain) José Julián García	Honda	19	+13.891	25	
21	25	(Spain) Raúl Fernández	KTM	19	+14.197	21	
22	32	(Italy) Davide Pizzoli	Honda	19	+16.586	23	
23	82	(Italy) Stefano Nepa	KTM	19	+20.338	19	
24	53	(Turkey) Deniz Öncü	KTM	19	+20.870	26	
25	22	(Japan) Kazuki Masaki	KTM	19	+34.135	28	
26	54	(Italy) Riccardo Rossi	Honda	19	+43.083	18	
27	69	(United Kingdom) Tom Booth-Amos	KTM	19	+1:06.771	30	
NC	76	(Kazakhstan) Makar Yurchenko	KTM	19	+29.508 (Note: Not classified due to finishing the race through pits.)	22	
Ret	42	(Spain) Marcos Ramírez	Honda	5	Accident	20	
Ret	5	(Spain) Jaume Masiá	KTM	1	Accident	15	
DNS	27	(Japan) Kaito Toba	Honda		Did not start		
OFFICIAL MOTO3 REPORT

- Kaito Toba withdrew from the event after Friday practice due to a shoulder injury suffered during the previous round at Misano.

== Championship standings after the race ==
=== MotoGP ===
Pos.	Rider	Points
1	(Spain) Marc Márquez	300
2	(Italy) Andrea Dovizioso	202
3	(Spain) Álex Rins	156
4	(Italy) Danilo Petrucci	155
5	(Spain) Maverick Viñales	147
6	(Italy) Valentino Rossi	137
7	(France) Fabio Quartararo	123
8	(Australia) Jack Miller	117
9	(United Kingdom) Cal Crutchlow	98
10	(Italy) Franco Morbidelli	80

=== Moto2 ===
Pos.	Rider	Points
1	(Spain) Álex Márquez	213
2	(Spain) Jorge Navarro	175
3	(Spain) Augusto Fernández	171
4	(Switzerland) Thomas Lüthi	169
5	(South Africa) Brad Binder	160
6	(Italy) Lorenzo Baldassarri	138
7	(Italy) Luca Marini	126
8	(Germany) Marcel Schrötter	116
9	(Italy) Fabio Di Giannantonio	94
10	(Italy) Enea Bastianini	81

=== Moto3 ===
Pos.	Rider	Points
1	(Italy) Lorenzo Dalla Porta	184
2	(Spain) Arón Canet	182
3	(Italy) Tony Arbolino	155
4	(United Kingdom) John McPhee	126
5	(Spain) Marcos Ramírez	123
6	(Italy) Niccolò Antonelli	118
7	(Spain) Jaume Masiá	96
8	(Italy) Celestino Vietti	90
9	(Japan) Ai Ogura	86
10	(Japan) Tatsuki Suzuki	85

== Notes ==
Previous race: 2019 San Marino Grand Prix	FIM Grand Prix World Championship; 2019 season	Next race: 2019 Thailand Grand Prix
Previous race: 2018 Aragon Grand Prix	Aragon motorcycle Grand Prix	Next race: 2020 Aragon Grand Prix
