= 2019 MotoGP World Championship =

71st running of the MotoGP World Championship

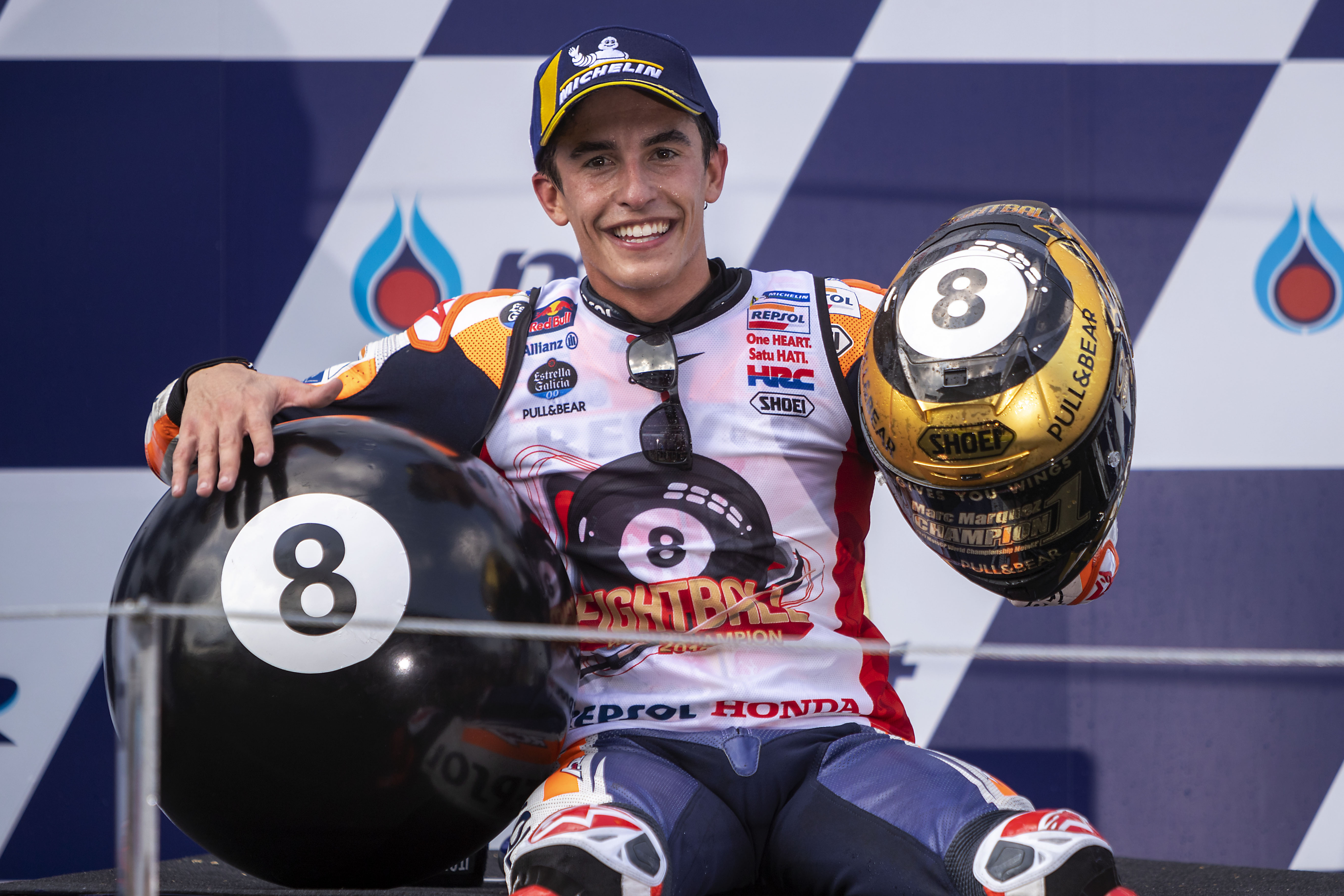
Marc Márquez was the 2019 MotoGP World Riders' Champion.

The 2019 FIM MotoGP World Championship was the premier class of the 71st Fédération Internationale de Motocyclisme (FIM) Road Racing World Championship season, the highest level of competition in motorcycle road racing.

After fifteen rounds of the championship, Marc Márquez successfully defended his Rider's Championship in Thailand taking his sixth premier class title and fourth in a row, having already won nine races. He ultimately won 12 races, breaking the single-season points and podium records with 420 points and 18 podium finishes from 19 races. Andrea Dovizioso once again finished second for Ducati for the third consecutive season with two wins, and Maverick Viñales with Yamaha sealed third with two wins. Álex Rins and Danilo Petrucci were the other race winners, both riders achieving their first-ever race wins during the season. In spite of Márquez's sizeable championship margin, seven races, namely Qatar, Italy, Austria, Britain, San Marino, Thailand, and Australia were decided with last-lap passes, the season having seen plenty of close racing.

== Teams and riders ==
Team	Constructor	Motorcycle	No.	Rider	Rounds
(Italy) Aprilia Racing Team Gresini	Aprilia	RS-GP	29	(Italy) Andrea Iannone	All
(Italy) Aprilia Racing Team Gresini	Aprilia	RS-GP	41	(Spain) Aleix Espargaró	All
(Italy) Aprilia Factory Racing (Italy) Aprilia Racing Team	Aprilia	RS-GP	38	(United Kingdom) Bradley Smith	1, 4, 7, 14
(Italy) Mission Winnow Ducati (Italy) Ducati Team	Ducati	Desmosedici GP19	04	(Italy) Andrea Dovizioso	All
(Italy) Mission Winnow Ducati (Italy) Ducati Team	Ducati	Desmosedici GP19	9	(Italy) Danilo Petrucci	All
(Italy) Mission Winnow Ducati (Italy) Ducati Team	Ducati	Desmosedici GP19	51	(Italy) Michele Pirro	6, 13, 19
(Italy) Alma Pramac Racing (Italy) Pramac Racing	Ducati	Desmosedici GP19	43	(Australia) Jack Miller	All
(Italy) Alma Pramac Racing (Italy) Pramac Racing	Ducati	Desmosedici GP18	63	(Italy) Francesco Bagnaia	All
(Spain) Reale Avintia Racing	Ducati	Desmosedici GP18	17	(Czech Republic) Karel Abraham	All
(Spain) Reale Avintia Racing	Ducati	Desmosedici GP18	53	(Spain) Tito Rabat	1–17, 19
(Monaco) LCR Honda Idemitsu (Monaco) LCR Honda Castrol	Honda	RC213V	30	(Japan) Takaaki Nakagami	1–16
(Monaco) LCR Honda Idemitsu (Monaco) LCR Honda Castrol	Honda	RC213V	5	(France) Johann Zarco	17–19
(Monaco) LCR Honda Idemitsu (Monaco) LCR Honda Castrol	Honda	RC213V	35	(United Kingdom) Cal Crutchlow	All
(Japan) Repsol Honda Team	Honda	RC213V	93	(Spain) Marc Márquez	All
(Japan) Repsol Honda Team	Honda	RC213V	99	(Spain) Jorge Lorenzo	1–8, 12–19
(Japan) Repsol Honda Team	Honda	RC213V	6	(Germany) Stefan Bradl	9–11
(Japan) Team HRC	Honda	RC213V	6	(Germany) Stefan Bradl	4
(Austria) Red Bull KTM Factory Racing	KTM	RC16	5	(France) Johann Zarco	1–13
(Austria) Red Bull KTM Factory Racing	KTM	RC16	82	(Finland) Mika Kallio	14–19
(Austria) Red Bull KTM Factory Racing	KTM	RC16	44	(Spain) Pol Espargaró	All
(France) Red Bull KTM Tech3	KTM	RC16	55	(Malaysia) Hafizh Syahrin	All
(France) Red Bull KTM Tech3	KTM	RC16	88	(Portugal) Miguel Oliveira	1–18
(France) Red Bull KTM Tech3	KTM	RC16	27	(Spain) Iker Lecuona	19
(Japan) Team Suzuki Ecstar	Suzuki	GSX-RR	36	(Spain) Joan Mir	1–10, 13–19
(Japan) Team Suzuki Ecstar	Suzuki	GSX-RR	50	(France) Sylvain Guintoli	12
(Japan) Team Suzuki Ecstar	Suzuki	GSX-RR	42	(Spain) Álex Rins	All
(Japan) Team Suzuki Ecstar	Suzuki	GSX-RR	50	(France) Sylvain Guintoli	7, 10, 16
(Japan) Monster Energy Yamaha MotoGP	Yamaha	YZR-M1	12	(Spain) Maverick Viñales	All
(Japan) Monster Energy Yamaha MotoGP	Yamaha	YZR-M1	46	(Italy) Valentino Rossi	All
(Malaysia) Petronas Yamaha SRT	Yamaha	YZR-M1	20	(France) Fabio Quartararo	All
(Malaysia) Petronas Yamaha SRT	Yamaha	YZR-M1	21	(Italy) Franco Morbidelli	All

Key
Regular rider
Replacement rider
Wildcard rider

All teams used series-specified Michelin tyres.

=== Team changes ===
- Tech3 switched to KTM machines, ending their twenty-year satellite relationship with Yamaha. As a result of this link-up, Tech3 dropped long-time title sponsor Monster Energy, replaced by rival Austrian energy drink Red Bull.
- Ángel Nieto Team joined forces with Sepang Racing Team to field two Yamaha YZR-M1 satellite bikes, replacing Tech3 as Yamaha's satellite team.
- EG 0,0 Marc VDS shut down their MotoGP class operation to make room for MotoE bikes.

=== Rider changes ===
- Francesco Bagnaia was promoted to the MotoGP class, joining Pramac Racing. He replaced Danilo Petrucci, who moved to Ducati factory team, taking over the seat vacated by Jorge Lorenzo.
- Andrea Iannone left Suzuki at the end of the 2018 championship after two seasons. He joined Aprilia where he replaced Scott Redding, who moved to the British Superbike Championship. 2017 Moto3 champion Joan Mir took over the seat vacated by Iannone at Suzuki.
- Miguel Oliveira was promoted to the MotoGP class, joining Tech3 and partner with Malaysian rider Hafizh Syahrin. He will become the first rider to come through the Red Bull KTM system to the premier class, having competed in the Rookies Cup, Moto3 and Moto2 with KTM bikes.
- Jorge Lorenzo left Ducati's factory team after two seasons to join Repsol Honda Team. He replaced Dani Pedrosa, who retired at the conclusion of the 2018 season to take a testing role with KTM.
- Johann Zarco left Tech3 to join Red Bull KTM Factory Racing. He replaced Bradley Smith who switched to the MotoE World Cup.
- Franco Morbidelli joined Petronas Yamaha SRT. He was partnered by Fabio Quartararo.
- Thomas Lüthi stepped back to Moto2 with the Dynavolt Intact GP team.
- Having competed in MotoGP since 2010, Álvaro Bautista switched to the Superbike World Championship.
- Karel Abraham joined Reale Avintia Racing after two seasons with Aspar/Ángel Nieto Team.
- Xavier Simeon switched to the MotoE World Cup while remaining with Avintia Racing.
- Maverick Viñales changed his race number to 12, replacing the number 25 he had previously used for the majority of his Grand Prix racing career.

==== Mid-season changes ====
- Because of two fractured vertebrae sustained in Assen, Jorge Lorenzo was absent from the German, Czech, and Austrian rounds. He was replaced by Stefan Bradl.
- Because of a pulmonary contusion, Joan Mir missed the Austrian and British rounds. He was replaced by Sylvain Guintoli at Silverstone.
- Mika Kallio replaced Johann Zarco following his early release by KTM, starting from the Aragon Grand Prix.
- Johann Zarco replaced Takaaki Nakagami in the Australian, Malaysian and Valencian rounds, following the decision of the Japanese rider to operate on his right shoulder following a trauma sustained during the championship.
- Moto2 rider Iker Lecuona made his MotoGP debut prematurely at the final race of the season, replacing Miguel Oliveira at Tech3, who was sidelined following an injury sustained at the Australian Grand Prix. Lecuona was previously signed to race for Tech3 in MotoGP beginning in 2020.

== Rule changes ==
The season saw the introduction of a new penalty called the "Long Lap" penalty for infractions such as exceeding track limits or engaging in reckless riding. At each circuit, a route is to be defined and marked at a safe point around the circuit (usually an asphalt run-off area outside of a turn). The penalised rider must ride through the defined area within 3 laps of being notified, thereby suffering a penalty equivalent typically to 2 or more seconds on that lap.

== Calendar ==
The following Grands Prix took place during the season:

Round	Date	Grand Prix	Circuit
1	10 March (Note: Night race)	VisitQatar Grand Prix	Lusail International Circuit, Lusail
2	31 March	Gran Premio Motul de la República Argentina	Autódromo Termas de Río Hondo, Termas de Río Hondo
3	14 April	(United States) Red Bull Grand Prix of The Americas	Circuit of the Americas, Austin
4	5 May	(Spain) Gran Premio Red Bull de España	Circuito de Jerez, Jerez de la Frontera
5	19 May	Shark Helmets Grand Prix de France	Bugatti Circuit, Le Mans
6	2 June	(Italy) Gran Premio d'Italia Oakley	Mugello Circuit, Scarperia e San Piero
7	16 June	(Catalonia) Gran Premi Monster Energy de Catalunya	Circuit de Barcelona-Catalunya, Montmeló
8	30 June	(Netherlands) Motul TT Assen	TT Circuit Assen, Assen
9	7 July	(Germany) HJC Helmets Motorrad Grand Prix Deutschland	Sachsenring, Hohenstein-Ernstthal
10	4 August	(Czech Republic) Monster Energy Grand Prix České republiky	Brno Circuit, Brno
11	11 August	(Austria) myWorld Motorrad Grand Prix von Österreich	Red Bull Ring, Spielberg
12	25 August	(United Kingdom) GoPro British Grand Prix	Silverstone Circuit, Silverstone
13	15 September	Gran Premio Octo di San Marino e della Riviera di Rimini	Misano World Circuit, Misano Adriatico
14	22 September	(Aragon) Gran Premio Michelin de Aragón	MotorLand Aragón, Alcañiz
15	6 October	PTT Thailand Grand Prix	Buriram International Circuit, Buriram
16	20 October	Motul Grand Prix of Japan	Motegi Circuit, Motegi
17	27 October	(Australia) Pramac Generac Australian Motorcycle Grand Prix	Phillip Island Grand Prix Circuit, Phillip Island
18	3 November	Shell Malaysia Motorcycle Grand Prix	Sepang International Circuit, Sepang
19	17 November	(Valencian Community) Gran Premio Motul de la Comunitat Valenciana	Circuit Ricardo Tormo, Valencia

== Results and standings ==
=== Grands Prix ===
Round	Grand Prix	Pole position	Fastest lap	Winning rider	Winning team	Winning constructor	Report
1	Qatar motorcycle Grand Prix	(Spain) Maverick Viñales	(France) Fabio Quartararo	(Italy) Andrea Dovizioso	(Italy) Mission Winnow Ducati	(Italy) Ducati	Report
2	(Argentina) Argentine Republic motorcycle Grand Prix	(Spain) Marc Márquez	(Spain) Marc Márquez	(Spain) Marc Márquez	(Japan) Repsol Honda Team	(Japan) Honda	Report
3	(United States) Motorcycle Grand Prix of the Americas	(Spain) Marc Márquez	(Spain) Marc Márquez	(Spain) Álex Rins	(Japan) Team Suzuki Ecstar	(Japan) Suzuki	Report
4	(Spain) Spanish motorcycle Grand Prix	(France) Fabio Quartararo	(Spain) Marc Márquez	(Spain) Marc Márquez	(Japan) Repsol Honda Team	(Japan) Honda	Report
5	(France) French motorcycle Grand Prix	(Spain) Marc Márquez	(France) Fabio Quartararo	(Spain) Marc Márquez	(Japan) Repsol Honda Team	(Japan) Honda	Report
6	(Italy) Italian motorcycle Grand Prix	(Spain) Marc Márquez	(Australia) Jack Miller	(Italy) Danilo Petrucci	(Italy) Mission Winnow Ducati	(Italy) Ducati	Report
7	(Catalonia) Catalan motorcycle Grand Prix	(France) Fabio Quartararo	(Spain) Marc Márquez	(Spain) Marc Márquez	(Japan) Repsol Honda Team	(Japan) Honda	Report
8	(Netherlands) Dutch TT	(France) Fabio Quartararo	(Spain) Marc Márquez	(Spain) Maverick Viñales	(Japan) Monster Energy Yamaha MotoGP	(Japan) Yamaha	Report
9	(Germany) German motorcycle Grand Prix	(Spain) Marc Márquez	(Spain) Marc Márquez	(Spain) Marc Márquez	(Japan) Repsol Honda Team	(Japan) Honda	Report
10	Czech Republic motorcycle Grand Prix	(Spain) Marc Márquez	(Spain) Álex Rins	(Spain) Marc Márquez	(Japan) Repsol Honda Team	(Japan) Honda	Report
11	(Austria) Austrian motorcycle Grand Prix	(Spain) Marc Márquez	(Italy) Andrea Dovizioso	(Italy) Andrea Dovizioso	(Italy) Ducati Team	(Italy) Ducati	Report
12	(United Kingdom) British motorcycle Grand Prix	(Spain) Marc Márquez	(Spain) Marc Márquez	(Spain) Álex Rins	(Japan) Team Suzuki Ecstar	(Japan) Suzuki	Report
13	San Marino and Rimini Riviera motorcycle Grand Prix	(Spain) Maverick Viñales	(Spain) Marc Márquez	(Spain) Marc Márquez	(Japan) Repsol Honda Team	(Japan) Honda	Report
14	Aragon motorcycle Grand Prix	(Spain) Marc Márquez	(Spain) Marc Márquez	(Spain) Marc Márquez	(Japan) Repsol Honda Team	(Japan) Honda	Report
15	Thailand motorcycle Grand Prix	(France) Fabio Quartararo	(Spain) Marc Márquez	(Spain) Marc Márquez	(Japan) Repsol Honda Team	(Japan) Honda	Report
16	(Japan) Japanese motorcycle Grand Prix	(Spain) Marc Márquez	(Spain) Marc Márquez	(Spain) Marc Márquez	(Japan) Repsol Honda Team	(Japan) Honda	Report
17	(Australia) Australian motorcycle Grand Prix	(Spain) Maverick Viñales	(Spain) Maverick Viñales	(Spain) Marc Márquez	(Japan) Repsol Honda Team	(Japan) Honda	Report
18	(Malaysia) Malaysian motorcycle Grand Prix	(France) Fabio Quartararo	(Italy) Valentino Rossi	(Spain) Maverick Viñales	(Japan) Monster Energy Yamaha MotoGP	(Japan) Yamaha	Report
19	Valencian Community motorcycle Grand Prix	(France) Fabio Quartararo	(Spain) Marc Márquez	(Spain) Marc Márquez	(Japan) Repsol Honda Team	(Japan) Honda	Report

=== Riders' standings ===
Scoring system

Points were awarded to the top fifteen finishers. A rider had to finish the race to earn points.

Position	1st	2nd	3rd	4th	5th	6th	7th	8th	9th	10th	11th	12th	13th	14th	15th
Points	25	20	16	13	11	10	9	8	7	6	5	4	3	2	1

Pos.	Rider	Bike	Team	QAT (Qatar)	ARG (Argentina)	AME (United States)	SPA (Spain)	FRA (France)	ITA (Italy)	CAT (Catalonia)	NED (Netherlands)	GER (Germany)	CZE (Czech Republic)	AUT (Austria)	GBR (United Kingdom)	RSM (San Marino)	ARA (Aragon)	THA (Thailand)	JPN (Japan)	AUS (Australia)	MAL (Malaysia)	VAL (Valencian Community)	Pts
1	(Spain) Marc Márquez	Honda	Repsol Honda Team	2	1^{P F}	Ret^{P F}	1^{F}	1^{P}	2^{P}	1^{F}	2^{F}	1^{P F}	1^{P}	2^{P}	2^{P F}	1^{F}	1^{P F}	1^{F}	1^{P F}	1	2	1^{F}	420
2	(Italy) Andrea Dovizioso	Ducati	Ducati Team	1	3	4	4	2	3	Ret	4	5	2	1^{F}	Ret	6	2	4	3	7	3	4	269
3	(Spain) Maverick Viñales	Yamaha	Monster Energy Yamaha MotoGP	7^{P}	Ret	11	3	Ret	6	Ret	1	2	10	5	3	3^{P}	4	3	4	Ret^{P F}	1	6	211
4	(Spain) Álex Rins	Suzuki	Team Suzuki Ecstar	4	5	1	2	10	4	4	Ret	Ret	4^{F}	6	1	Ret	9	5	7	9	5	5	205
5	(France) Fabio Quartararo	Yamaha	Petronas Yamaha SRT	16^{F}	8	7	Ret^{P}	8^{F}	10	2^{P}	3^{P}	Ret	7	3	Ret	2	5	2^{P}	2	Ret	7^{P}	2^{P}	192
6	(Italy) Danilo Petrucci	Ducati	Ducati Team	6	6	6	5	3	1	3	6	4	8	9	7	10	12	9	9	Ret	9	Ret	176
7	(Italy) Valentino Rossi	Yamaha	Monster Energy Yamaha MotoGP	5	2	2	6	5	Ret	Ret	Ret	8	6	4	4	4	8	8	Ret	8	4^{F}	8	174
8	(Australia) Jack Miller	Ducati	Pramac Racing	Ret	4	3	Ret	4	Ret^{F}	5	9	6	3	Ret	8	9	3	14	10	3	8	3	165
9	(United Kingdom) Cal Crutchlow	Honda	LCR Honda Castrol	3	13	Ret	8	9	8	Ret	7	3	5	Ret	6	Ret	6	12	5	2	Ret	Ret	133
10	(Italy) Franco Morbidelli	Yamaha	Petronas Yamaha SRT	11	Ret	5	7	7	Ret	Ret	5	9	Ret	10	5	5	Ret	6	6	11	6	Ret	115
11	(Spain) Pol Espargaró	KTM	Red Bull KTM Factory Racing	12	10	8	13	6	9	7	11	12	11	Ret	9	7	DNS	13	11	12	11	10	100
12	(Spain) Joan Mir	Suzuki	Team Suzuki Ecstar	8	Ret	17	Ret	16	12	6	8	7	Ret			8	14	7	8	5	10	7	92
13	(Japan) Takaaki Nakagami	Honda	LCR Honda Idemitsu	9	7	10	9	Ret	5	8	Ret	14	9	11	17	18	10	10	16				74
14	(Spain) Aleix Espargaró	Aprilia	Aprilia Racing Team Gresini	10	9	Ret	11	12	11	Ret	12	Ret	18	14	Ret	12	7	Ret	15	10	13	9	63
15	(Italy) Francesco Bagnaia	Ducati	Pramac Racing	Ret	14	9	Ret	Ret	Ret	Ret	14	17	12	7	11	Ret	16	11	13	4	12	DNS	54
16	(Italy) Andrea Iannone	Aprilia	Aprilia Racing Team Gresini	14	17	12	DNS	Ret	15	11	10	13	17	16	10	DNS	11	15	Ret	6	DSQ	DSQ	43
17	(Portugal) Miguel Oliveira	KTM	Red Bull KTM Tech3	17	11	14	18	15	16	12	13	18	13	8	Ret	16	13	16	12	DNS	DNS		33
18	(France) Johann Zarco	KTM	Red Bull KTM Factory Racing	15	15	13	14	13	17	10	Ret	Ret	14	12	Ret	11							30
18	(France) Johann Zarco	Honda	LCR Honda Idemitsu																	13	Ret	Ret	30
19	(Spain) Jorge Lorenzo	Honda	Repsol Honda Team	13	12	Ret	12	11	13	Ret	DNS				14	14	20	18	17	16	14	13	28
20	(Spain) Tito Rabat	Ducati	Reale Avintia Racing	19	Ret	15	15	Ret	Ret	9	16	11	16	Ret	16	13	15	17	DNS	Ret		11	23
21	(Germany) Stefan Bradl	Honda	Team HRC				10																16
21	(Germany) Stefan Bradl	Honda	Repsol Honda Team									10	15	13									16
22	(Italy) Michele Pirro	Ducati	Ducati Team						7							Ret						Ret	9
23	(Malaysia) Hafizh Syahrin	KTM	Red Bull KTM Tech3	20	16	18	19	14	Ret	Ret	15	16	Ret	Ret	13	15	21	20	19	15	16	15	9
24	(Czech Republic) Karel Abraham	Ducati	Reale Avintia Racing	18	Ret	16	16	DSQ	14	Ret	17	15	19	15	15	17	18	19	18	14	17	14	9
25	(France) Sylvain Guintoli	Suzuki	Team Suzuki Ecstar							13			20		12				20				7
26	(Finland) Mika Kallio	KTM	Red Bull KTM Factory Racing														17	Ret	14	Ret	15	12	7
27	(United Kingdom) Bradley Smith	Aprilia	Aprilia Racing Team	Ret			17			Ret							19						0
	(Spain) Iker Lecuona	KTM	Red Bull KTM Tech3																			Ret	0
Pos.	Rider	Bike	Team	QAT (Qatar)	ARG (Argentina)	AME (United States)	SPA (Spain)	FRA (France)	ITA (Italy)	CAT (Catalonia)	NED (Netherlands)	GER (Germany)	CZE (Czech Republic)	AUT (Austria)	GBR (United Kingdom)	RSM (San Marino)	ARA (Aragon)	THA (Thailand)	JPN (Japan)	AUS (Australia)	MAL (Malaysia)	VAL (Valencian Community)	Pts

Race key
Colour	Result
Gold	Winner
Silver	2nd place
Bronze	3rd place
Green	Points finish
Blue	Non-points finish
Blue	Non-classified finish (NC)
Purple	Retired (Ret)
Red	Did not qualify (DNQ)
Black	Disqualified (DSQ)
White	Did not start (DNS)
White	Withdrew (WD)
White	Race cancelled (C)
Blank	Did not practice (DNP)
Blank	Excluded (EX)
Blank	Did not arrive (DNA)
Blank	Did not enter (empty cell)
Annotation	Meaning
P	Pole position
F	Fastest lap
Rider key
Colour	Meaning
Light blue	Rookie rider

=== Constructors' standings ===
Each constructor received the same number of points as their best placed rider in each race.

Pos.	Constructor	QAT (Qatar)	ARG (Argentina)	AME (United States)	SPA (Spain)	FRA (France)	ITA (Italy)	CAT (Catalonia)	NED (Netherlands)	GER (Germany)	CZE (Czech Republic)	AUT (Austria)	GBR (United Kingdom)	RSM (San Marino)	ARA (Aragon)	THA (Thailand)	JPN (Japan)	AUS (Australia)	MAL (Malaysia)	VAL (Valencian Community)	Pts
1	(Japan) Honda	2	1	10	1	1	2	1	2	1	1	2	2	1	1	1	1	1	2	1	426
2	(Japan) Yamaha	5	2	2	3	5	6	2	1	2	6	3	3	2	4	2	2	8	1	2	321
3	(Italy) Ducati	1	3	3	4	2	1	3	4	4	2	1	7	6	2	4	3	3	3	3	318
4	(Japan) Suzuki	4	5	1	2	10	4	4	8	7	4	6	1	8	9	5	7	5	5	5	234
5	(Austria) KTM	12	10	8	13	6	9	7	11	12	11	8	9	7	13	13	11	12	11	10	111
6	(Italy) Aprilia	10	9	12	11	12	11	11	10	13	17	14	10	12	7	15	15	6	13	9	88
Pos.	Constructor	QAT (Qatar)	ARG (Argentina)	AME (United States)	SPA (Spain)	FRA (France)	ITA (Italy)	CAT (Catalonia)	NED (Netherlands)	GER (Germany)	CZE (Czech Republic)	AUT (Austria)	GBR (United Kingdom)	RSM (San Marino)	ARA (Aragon)	THA (Thailand)	JPN (Japan)	AUS (Australia)	MAL (Malaysia)	VAL (Valencian Community)	Pts

=== Teams' standings ===
The teams' standings were based on results obtained by regular and substitute riders; wild-card entries were ineligible.

Pos.	Team	Bike No.	QAT (Qatar)	ARG (Argentina)	AME (United States)	SPA (Spain)	FRA (France)	ITA (Italy)	CAT (Catalonia)	NED (Netherlands)	GER (Germany)	CZE (Czech Republic)	AUT (Austria)	GBR (United Kingdom)	RSM (San Marino)	ARA (Aragon)	THA (Thailand)	JPN (Japan)	AUS (Australia)	MAL (Malaysia)	VAL (Valencian Community)	Pts
1	(Japan) Repsol Honda Team	6									10	15	13									458
1	(Japan) Repsol Honda Team	93	2	1^{P F}	Ret^{P F}	1^{F}	1^{P}	2^{P}	1^{F}	2^{F}	1^{P F}	1^{P}	2^{P}	2^{P F}	1^{F}	1^{P F}	1^{F}	1^{P F}	1	2	1^{F}	458
1	(Japan) Repsol Honda Team	99	13	12	Ret	12	11	13	Ret	DNS				14	14	20	18	17	16	14	13	458
2	(Italy) Ducati Team	04	1	3	4	4	2	3	Ret	4	5	2	1^{F}	Ret	6	2	4	3	7	3	4	445
2	(Italy) Ducati Team	9	6	6	6	5	3	1	3	6	4	8	9	7	10	12	9	9	Ret	9	Ret	445
3	(Japan) Monster Energy Yamaha MotoGP	12	7^{P}	Ret	11	3	Ret	6	Ret	1	2	10	5	3	3^{P}	4	3	4	Ret^{P F}	1	6	385
3	(Japan) Monster Energy Yamaha MotoGP	46	5	2	2	6	5	Ret	Ret	Ret	8	6	4	4	4	8	8	Ret	8	4^{F}	8	385
4	(Malaysia) Petronas Yamaha SRT	20	16^{F}	8	7	Ret^{P}	8^{F}	10	2^{P}	3^{P}	Ret	7	3	Ret	2	5	2^{P}	2	Ret	7^{P}	2^{P}	307
4	(Malaysia) Petronas Yamaha SRT	21	11	Ret	5	7	7	Ret	Ret	5	9	Ret	10	5	5	Ret	6	6	11	6	Ret	307
5	(Japan) Team Suzuki Ecstar	36	8	Ret	17	Ret	16	12	6	8	7	Ret			8	14	7	8	5	10	7	301
5	(Japan) Team Suzuki Ecstar	42	4	5	1	2	10	4	4	Ret	Ret	4^{F}	6	1	Ret	9	5	7	9	5	5	301
5	(Japan) Team Suzuki Ecstar	50												12								301
6	(Italy) Pramac Racing	43	Ret	4	3	Ret	4	Ret^{F}	5	9	6	3	Ret	8	9	3	14	10	3	8	3	219
6	(Italy) Pramac Racing	63	Ret	14	9	Ret	Ret	Ret	Ret	14	17	12	7	11	Ret	16	11	13	4	12	DNS	219
7	(Monaco) LCR Honda	5																	13	Ret	Ret	210
7	(Monaco) LCR Honda	30	9	7	10	9	Ret	5	8	Ret	14	9	11	17	18	10	10	16				210
7	(Monaco) LCR Honda	35	3	13	Ret	8	9	8	Ret	7	3	5	Ret	6	Ret	6	12	5	2	Ret	Ret	210
8	(Austria) Red Bull KTM Factory Racing	5	15	15	13	14	13	17	10	Ret	Ret	14	12	Ret	11							134
8	(Austria) Red Bull KTM Factory Racing	44	12	10	8	13	6	9	7	11	12	11	Ret	9	7	DNS	13	11	12	11	10	134
8	(Austria) Red Bull KTM Factory Racing	82														17	Ret	14	Ret	15	12	134
9	(Italy) Aprilia Racing Team Gresini	29	14	17	12	DNS	Ret	15	11	10	13	17	16	10	DNS	11	15	Ret	6	DSQ	DSQ	106
9	(Italy) Aprilia Racing Team Gresini	41	10	9	Ret	11	12	11	Ret	12	Ret	18	14	Ret	12	7	Ret	15	10	13	9	106
10	(France) Red Bull KTM Tech3	27																			Ret	42
10	(France) Red Bull KTM Tech3	55	20	16	18	19	14	Ret	Ret	15	16	Ret	Ret	13	15	21	20	19	15	16	15	42
10	(France) Red Bull KTM Tech3	88	17	11	14	18	15	16	12	13	18	13	8	Ret	16	13	16	12	DNS	DNS		42
11	(Spain) Reale Avintia Racing	17	18	Ret	16	16	DSQ	14	Ret	17	15	19	15	15	17	18	19	18	14	17	14	32
11	(Spain) Reale Avintia Racing	53	19	Ret	15	15	Ret	Ret	9	16	11	16	Ret	16	13	15	17	DNS	Ret		11	32
Pos.	Team	Bike No.	QAT (Qatar)	ARG (Argentina)	AME (United States)	SPA (Spain)	FRA (France)	ITA (Italy)	CAT (Catalonia)	NED (Netherlands)	GER (Germany)	CZE (Czech Republic)	AUT (Austria)	GBR (United Kingdom)	RSM (San Marino)	ARA (Aragon)	THA (Thailand)	JPN (Japan)	AUS (Australia)	MAL (Malaysia)	VAL (Valencian Community)	Pts
