= 2019 Spanish motorcycle Grand Prix =

2019 MotoGP in Spain

(Spain) 2019 Spanish Grand Prix
Race details
- Race 4 of 19 races in the 2019 Grand Prix motorcycle racing season
- Date: 5 May 2019
- Official name: Gran Premio Red Bull de España
- Location: Circuito de Jerez – Ángel Nieto, Jerez de la Frontera, Spain
- Course: Permanent racing facility; 4.423 km (2.748 mi)

MotoGP
Pole position
| Rider | (France) Fabio Quartararo | Yamaha |
| Time | 1:36.880 | |
Fastest lap
| Rider | (Spain) Marc Márquez | Honda |
| Time | 1:38.051 on lap 15 | |
Podium
| First | (Spain) Marc Márquez | Honda |
| Second | (Spain) Álex Rins | Suzuki |
| Third | (Spain) Maverick Viñales | Yamaha |

Moto2
Pole position
| Rider | (Spain) Jorge Navarro | Speed Up |
| Time | 1:41.182 | |
Fastest lap
| Rider | (Italy) Lorenzo Baldassarri | Kalex |
| Time | 1:41.539 on lap 3 | |
Podium
| First | (Italy) Lorenzo Baldassarri | Kalex |
| Second | (Spain) Jorge Navarro | Speed Up |
| Third | (Spain) Augusto Fernández | Kalex |

Moto3
Pole position
| Rider | (Italy) Lorenzo Dalla Porta | Honda |
| Time | 1:46.011 | |
Fastest lap
| Rider | (United Kingdom) John McPhee | Honda |
| Time | 1:46.365 on lap 2 | |
Podium
| First | (Italy) Niccolò Antonelli | Honda |
| Second | (Japan) Tatsuki Suzuki | Honda |
| Third | (Italy) Celestino Vietti | KTM |

The 2019 Spanish motorcycle Grand Prix was the fourth round of the 2019 MotoGP season. It was held at the Circuito de Jerez – Ángel Nieto in Jerez de la Frontera on 5 May 2019.

== Classification ==
=== MotoGP ===
| Pos. | No. | Rider | Team | Manufacturer | Laps | Time/Retired | Grid | Points |
|---|---|---|---|---|---|---|---|---|
| 1 | 93 | (Spain) Marc Márquez | Repsol Honda Team | Honda | 25 | 41:08.685 | 3 | 25 |
| 2 | 42 | (Spain) Álex Rins | Team Suzuki Ecstar | Suzuki | 25 | +1.654 | 9 | 20 |
| 3 | 12 | (Spain) Maverick Viñales | Monster Energy Yamaha MotoGP | Yamaha | 25 | +2.443 | 5 | 16 |
| 4 | 4 | (Italy) Andrea Dovizioso | Mission Winnow Ducati | Ducati | 25 | +2.804 | 4 | 13 |
| 5 | 9 | (Italy) Danilo Petrucci | Mission Winnow Ducati | Ducati | 25 | +4.748 | 7 | 11 |
| 6 | 46 | (Italy) Valentino Rossi | Monster Energy Yamaha MotoGP | Yamaha | 25 | +7.547 | 13 | 10 |
| 7 | 21 | (Italy) Franco Morbidelli | Petronas Yamaha SRT | Yamaha | 25 | +8.228 | 2 | 9 |
| 8 | 35 | (United Kingdom) Cal Crutchlow | LCR Honda Castrol | Honda | 25 | +10.052 | 6 | 8 |
| 9 | 30 | (Japan) Takaaki Nakagami | LCR Honda Idemitsu | Honda | 25 | +10.274 | 8 | 7 |
| 10 | 6 | (Germany) Stefan Bradl | Team HRC | Honda | 25 | +13.402 | 14 | 6 |
| 11 | 41 | (Spain) Aleix Espargaró | Aprilia Racing Team Gresini | Aprilia | 25 | +15.431 | 16 | 5 |
| 12 | 99 | (Spain) Jorge Lorenzo | Repsol Honda Team | Honda | 25 | +18.473 | 11 | 4 |
| 13 | 44 | (Spain) Pol Espargaró | Red Bull KTM Factory Racing | KTM | 25 | +20.156 | 17 | 3 |
| 14 | 5 | (France) Johann Zarco | Red Bull KTM Factory Racing | KTM | 25 | +26.706 | 18 | 2 |
| 15 | 53 | (Spain) Tito Rabat | Reale Avintia Racing | Ducati | 25 | +28.513 | 20 | 1 |
| 16 | 17 | (Czech Republic) Karel Abraham | Reale Avintia Racing | Ducati | 25 | +36.858 | 21 | |
| 17 | 38 | (United Kingdom) Bradley Smith | Aprilia Factory Racing | Aprilia | 25 | +41.390 | 19 | |
| 18 | 88 | (Portugal) Miguel Oliveira | Red Bull KTM Tech3 | KTM | 25 | +41.570 | 22 | |
| 19 | 55 | (Malaysia) Hafizh Syahrin | Red Bull KTM Tech3 | KTM | 25 | +50.568 | 23 | |
| Ret | 43 | (Australia) Jack Miller | Pramac Racing | Ducati | 22 | Accident | 15 | |
| Ret | 36 | (Spain) Joan Mir | Team Suzuki Ecstar | Suzuki | 20 | Accident Damage | 12 | |
| Ret | 20 | (France) Fabio Quartararo | Petronas Yamaha SRT | Yamaha | 13 | Gearbox | 1 | |
| Ret | 63 | (Italy) Francesco Bagnaia | Pramac Racing | Ducati | 6 | Accident | 10 | |
| DNS | 29 | (Italy) Andrea Iannone | Aprilia Racing Team Gresini | Aprilia | | Did not start | | |
Sources:

- Andrea Iannone was declared unfit to start the race following a crash in practice.

=== Moto2 ===
| Pos. | No. | Rider | Manufacturer | Laps | Time/Retired | Grid | Points |
|---|---|---|---|---|---|---|---|
| 1 | 7 | (Italy) Lorenzo Baldassarri | Kalex | 15 | 25:33.841 | 6 | 25 |
| 2 | 9 | (Spain) Jorge Navarro | Speed Up | 15 | +0.359 | 1 | 20 |
| 3 | 40 | (Spain) Augusto Fernández | Kalex | 15 | +1.091 | 3 | 16 |
| 4 | 12 | (Switzerland) Thomas Lüthi | Kalex | 15 | +2.428 | 8 | 13 |
| 5 | 41 | (South Africa) Brad Binder | KTM | 15 | +3.767 | 10 | 11 |
| 6 | 97 | (Spain) Xavi Vierge | Kalex | 15 | +4.955 | 12 | 10 |
| 7 | 45 | (Japan) Tetsuta Nagashima | Kalex | 15 | +7.842 | 9 | 9 |
| 8 | 10 | (Italy) Luca Marini | Kalex | 15 | +8.026 | 13 | 8 |
| 9 | 11 | (Italy) Nicolò Bulega | Kalex | 15 | +8.571 | 5 | 7 |
| 10 | 27 | (Spain) Iker Lecuona | KTM | 15 | +10.235 | 16 | 6 |
| 11 | 33 | (Italy) Enea Bastianini | Kalex | 15 | +10.445 | 18 | 5 |
| 12 | 21 | (Italy) Fabio Di Giannantonio | Speed Up | 15 | +12.708 | 7 | 4 |
| 13 | 77 | (Switzerland) Dominique Aegerter | MV Agusta | 15 | +14.179 | 23 | 3 |
| 14 | 5 | (Italy) Andrea Locatelli | Kalex | 15 | +15.470 | 15 | 2 |
| 15 | 23 | (Germany) Marcel Schrötter | Kalex | 15 | +16.188 | 14 | 1 |
| 16 | 64 | (Netherlands) Bo Bendsneyder | NTS | 15 | +18.335 | 20 | |
| 17 | 35 | (Thailand) Somkiat Chantra | Kalex | 15 | +20.944 | 21 | |
| 18 | 4 | (South Africa) Steven Odendaal | NTS | 15 | +22.591 | 26 | |
| 19 | 3 | (Germany) Lukas Tulovic | KTM | 15 | +25.896 | 28 | |
| 20 | 16 | (United States) Joe Roberts | KTM | 15 | +27.150 | 27 | |
| 21 | 62 | (Italy) Stefano Manzi | MV Agusta | 15 | +27.887 | 19 | |
| 22 | 72 | (Italy) Marco Bezzecchi | KTM | 15 | +28.312 | 25 | |
| 23 | 65 | (Germany) Philipp Öttl | KTM | 15 | +29.063 | 30 | |
| 24 | 73 | (Spain) Álex Márquez | Kalex | 15 | +32.311 | 2 | |
| 25 | 18 | (Andorra) Xavi Cardelús | KTM | 15 | +1:01.987 | 31 | |
| Ret | 88 | (Spain) Jorge Martín | KTM | 7 | Accident | 22 | |
| Ret | 22 | (United Kingdom) Sam Lowes | Kalex | 7 | Accident Damage | 11 | |
| Ret | 54 | (Italy) Mattia Pasini | KTM | 5 | Accident | 24 | |
| Ret | 24 | (Italy) Simone Corsi | Kalex | 3 | Accident | 17 | |
| DNS | 87 | (Australia) Remy Gardner | Kalex | 0 | Did not restart | 4 | |
| DNS | 20 | (Indonesia) Dimas Ekky Pratama | Kalex | 0 | Did not restart | 29 | |
| DNS | 89 | (Malaysia) Khairul Idham Pawi | Kalex | | Did not start | | |
OFFICIAL MOTO2 REPORT

- Khairul Idham Pawi suffered a broken finger in a crash during Friday practice and withdrew from the event.

=== Moto3 ===
| Pos. | No. | Rider | Manufacturer | Laps | Time/Retired | Grid | Points |
|---|---|---|---|---|---|---|---|
| 1 | 23 | (Italy) Niccolò Antonelli | Honda | 22 | 39:30.327 | 4 | 25 |
| 2 | 24 | (Japan) Tatsuki Suzuki | Honda | 22 | +0.242 | 2 | 20 |
| 3 | 13 | (Italy) Celestino Vietti | KTM | 22 | +0.305 | 3 | 16 |
| 4 | 44 | (Spain) Arón Canet | KTM | 22 | +0.472 | 7 | 13 |
| 5 | 75 | (Spain) Albert Arenas | KTM | 22 | +0.563 | 9 | 11 |
| 6 | 27 | (Japan) Kaito Toba | Honda | 22 | +1.133 | 24 | 10 |
| 7 | 84 | (Czech Republic) Jakub Kornfeil | KTM | 22 | +1.187 | 12 | 9 |
| 8 | 48 | (Italy) Lorenzo Dalla Porta | Honda | 22 | +1.291 | 1 | 8 |
| 9 | 79 | (Japan) Ai Ogura | Honda | 22 | +1.430 | 20 | 7 |
| 10 | 16 | (Italy) Andrea Migno | KTM | 22 | +1.441 | 13 | 6 |
| 11 | 40 | (South Africa) Darryn Binder | KTM | 22 | +6.836 | 25 | 5 |
| 12 | 17 | (United Kingdom) John McPhee | Honda | 22 | +6.851 | 14 | 4 |
| 13 | 22 | (Japan) Kazuki Masaki | KTM | 22 | +7.104 | 22 | 3 |
| 14 | 21 | (Spain) Alonso López | Honda | 22 | +7.113 | 21 | 2 |
| 15 | 71 | (Japan) Ayumu Sasaki | Honda | 22 | +7.119 | 11 | 1 |
| 16 | 7 | (Italy) Dennis Foggia | KTM | 22 | +8.968 (Note: 3-second penalty for exceeding track limits.) | 5 | |
| 17 | 14 | (Italy) Tony Arbolino | Honda | 22 | +10.252 | 19 | |
| 18 | 61 | (Turkey) Can Öncü | KTM | 22 | +15.474 | 26 | |
| 19 | 82 | (Italy) Stefano Nepa | KTM | 22 | +30.984 | 16 | |
| 20 | 77 | (Spain) Vicente Pérez | KTM | 22 | +31.035 | 29 | |
| 21 | 54 | (Italy) Riccardo Rossi | Honda | 22 | +38.862 | 27 | |
| 22 | 83 | (Brazil) Meikon Kawakami | KTM | 22 | +47.894 | 31 | |
| 23 | 42 | (Spain) Marcos Ramírez | Honda | 22 | +1:14.849 | 8 | |
| Ret | 76 | (Kazakhstan) Makar Yurchenko | KTM | 21 | Retired | 18 | |
| Ret | 11 | (Spain) Sergio García | Honda | 18 | Accident | 23 | |
| Ret | 25 | (Spain) Raúl Fernández | KTM | 18 | Accident | 17 | |
| Ret | 55 | (Italy) Romano Fenati | Honda | 18 | Off Course | 10 | |
| Ret | 69 | (United Kingdom) Tom Booth-Amos | KTM | 18 | Accident | 30 | |
| Ret | 19 | (Argentina) Gabriel Rodrigo | Honda | 14 | Handling | 6 | |
| Ret | 12 | (Czech Republic) Filip Salač | KTM | 10 | Ignition Switch | 28 | |
| Ret | 5 | (Spain) Jaume Masiá | KTM | 2 | Accident | 15 | |
OFFICIAL MOTO3 REPORT

== Championship standings after the race ==
=== MotoGP ===
| Pos. | Rider | Points |
|---|---|---|
| 1 | (Spain) Marc Márquez | 70 |
| 2 | (Spain) Álex Rins | 69 |
| 3 | (Italy) Andrea Dovizioso | 67 |
| 4 | (Italy) Valentino Rossi | 61 |
| 5 | (Italy) Danilo Petrucci | 41 |
| 6 | (Spain) Maverick Viñales | 30 |
| 7 | (Australia) Jack Miller | 29 |
| 8 | (Japan) Takaaki Nakagami | 29 |
| 9 | (United Kingdom) Cal Crutchlow | 27 |
| 10 | (Italy) Franco Morbidelli | 25 |

=== Moto2 ===
| Pos. | Rider | Points |
|---|---|---|
| 1 | (Italy) Lorenzo Baldassarri | 75 |
| 2 | (Switzerland) Thomas Lüthi | 58 |
| 3 | (Germany) Marcel Schrötter | 48 |
| 4 | (Spain) Jorge Navarro | 44 |
| 5 | (Australia) Remy Gardner | 38 |
| 6 | (Spain) Álex Márquez | 36 |
| 7 | (Italy) Luca Marini | 35 |
| 8 | (Spain) Augusto Fernández | 27 |
| 9 | (Italy) Enea Bastianini | 26 |
| 10 | (South Africa) Brad Binder | 25 |

=== Moto3 ===
| Pos. | Rider | Points |
|---|---|---|
| 1 | (Spain) Arón Canet | 58 |
| 2 | (Italy) Niccolò Antonelli | 57 |
| 3 | (Spain) Jaume Masiá | 45 |
| 4 | (Japan) Kaito Toba | 41 |
| 5 | (Italy) Lorenzo Dalla Porta | 40 |
| 6 | (Italy) Celestino Vietti | 29 |
| 7 | (Italy) Andrea Migno | 29 |
| 8 | (South Africa) Darryn Binder | 26 |
| 9 | (Italy) Tony Arbolino | 26 |
| 10 | (Argentina) Gabriel Rodrigo | 24 |

== Notes ==
| Previous race: 2019 Grand Prix of the Americas | FIM Grand Prix World Championship; 2019 season | Next race: 2019 French Grand Prix |
| Previous race: 2018 Spanish Grand Prix | Spanish motorcycle Grand Prix | Next race: 2020 Spanish Grand Prix |
