= Riccardo Rossi (motorcyclist) =

Italian motorcycle racer

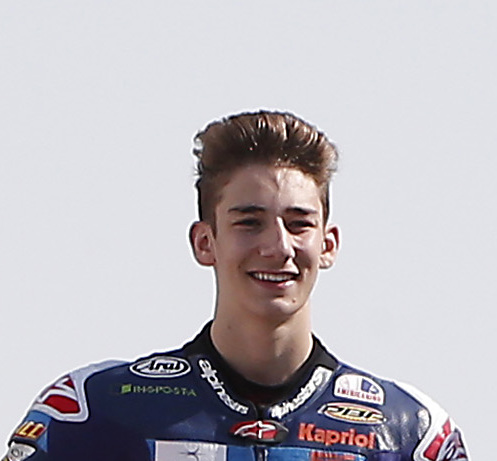
- Rossi in 2019
- Nationality: Italian
- Born: 21 March 2002 (age 24); Genoa, Italy
- Current team: Renzi Corse
- Bike number: 54
Motorcycle racing career statistics
Moto3 World Championship
Active years	2019–2025
Manufacturers	Honda (2019, 2022–2023, 2025), KTM (2020–2021, 2024)
2025 championship position	22nd (24 pts)
Starts / Wins / Podiums / Poles / F. laps / Points; 130 / 0 / 2 / 0 / 2 / 270
Supersport World Championship
Active years	2026–
Manufacturers	Ducati
Championships	0
Starts / Wins / Podiums / Poles / F. laps / Points; 2 / 0 / 0 / 0 / 0 / 0

Riccardo Rossi (born 21 March 2002) is an Italian motorcycle rider, currently competing in the Supersport World Championship for the Renzi Corse team. He has also raced in Moto3 for the Rivacold Snipers team.

== Career ==
=== Early career ===
Rossi's passion for motorcycles started early, with the first experiences in mini-moto and with the participation in the MiniGP Italian Championship. In 2015, it started to get serious and Rossi took part to the CIV, in the PreMoto3 category, with the 125 of the SIC58 Team. The results were immediately reassuring, indeed he finished the season fourth.

The following year, Rossi moved to the RMU team, in the CIV PreMoto3, ending the Championship in second position. In 2017, it was time to grow and face more difficult and stimulating challenges. In that year, Rossi joined both the CIV and CEV Junior World Championship. It was an important season, where he could gain experience and start to know some of the important tracks of the world.

In 2018, Rossi participated in the CIV, with the Gresini Racing Junior Team, and in the CEV Moto3, with the Laglisse Academy Team.

=== Moto3 ===
In 2019, Rossi made his debut in the Moto3 World Championship riding the Honda motorbike of Gresini. In 2020 and 2021, he continued his path in the same category but with the Boe Skull Rider Team. In 2022, Rossi came back to SIC58, proving to have what it takes to compete with the best. His best result of 2022 was the podium (third position) in Thailand.

==== CIP Green Power (2024-) ====
From 2024 Moto3 season, Rossi was going to move to Prüstel GP, partnering with Xavi Artigas. But the team left the championship at the end of the 2023 season.

== Career statistics ==
=== FIM CEV Moto3 Junior World Championship ===
==== Races by year ====
(key) (Races in bold indicate pole position, races in italics indicate fastest lap)

Year	Bike	1	2	3	4	5	6	7	8	9	10	11	12	Pos	Pts
2016	Honda	VAL1	VAL2	LMS	ARA	CAT1	CAT2	ALB	ALG	JER1	JER2	VAL1; Ret	VAL2; 25	NC	0
2017	Husqvarna	ALB; DNQ	LMS; 25	CAT1; 23	CAT2; 19	VAL1; Ret	VAL2; 22	EST; 14	JER1; 30	JER1; 22	ARA; 31	VAL1; 28	VAL2; 26	38th	2
2018	Husqvarna	EST; 10	VAL1; 7	VAL2; 7	FRA; 8	CAT1; Ret	CAT2; 22	ARA; Ret	JER1; Ret	JER2; 13	ALB; 31	VAL1; 13	VAL2; 16	15th	38

=== FIM Moto2 European Championship ===
==== Races by year ====
(key) (Races in bold indicate pole position, races in italics indicate fastest lap)

Year	Bike	1	2	3	4	5	6	7	8	9	10	11	Pos	Pts
2025	Kalex	EST1	EST2	JER	MAG1	MAG2	ARA1; DNS	ARA2; DNS	MIS	CAT1	CAT2	VAL	NC	0

=== Grand Prix motorcycle racing ===
==== By season ====
Season	Class	Motorcycle	Team	Race	Win	Podium	Pole	FLap	Pts	Plcd
2019	Moto3	Honda	Kömmerling Gresini Racing Moto3	19	0	0	0	0	8	32nd
2020	Moto3	KTM	BOE Skull Rider Facile Energy	14	0	0	0	0	10	25th
2021	Moto3	KTM	BOE Owlride	17	0	1	0	1	29	23rd
2022	Moto3	Honda	Sic58 Squadra Corse	20	0	1	0	1	87	14th
2023	Moto3	Honda	Sic58 Squadra Corse	20	0	0	0	0	79	14th
2024	Moto3	KTM	CIP Green Power	20	0	0	0	0	33	18th
2025	Moto3	Honda	Rivacold Snipers Team	20	0	0	0	0	24	22nd
Total				**130**	**0**	**2**	**0**	**2**	**270**	

==== By class ====
Class	Seasons	1st GP	1st pod	1st win	Race	Win	Podiums	Pole	FLap	Pts	WChmp
Moto3	2019–2025	2019 Qatar	2021 France		130	0	2	0	2	270	0
Total	2019–2025				**130**	**0**	**2**	**0**	**2**	**270**	**0**

==== Races by year ====
(key) (Races in bold indicate pole position; races in italics indicate fastest lap)

Year	Class	Bike	1	2	3	4	5	6	7	8	9	10	11	12	13	14	15	16	17	18	19	20	21	22	Pos	Pts
2019	Moto3	Honda	QAT; 22	ARG; 22	AME; 21	SPA; 21	FRA; Ret	ITA; 21	CAT; 17	NED; 21	GER; 22	CZE; Ret	AUT; 23	GBR; 27	RSM; 14	ARA; 26	THA; 13	JPN; 21	AUS; Ret	MAL; 15	VAL; 14				32nd	8
2020	Moto3	KTM	QAT; 24	SPA; Ret	ANC; 21	CZE; Ret	AUT; 18	STY; Ret	RSM; 13	EMI; 21	CAT; 20	FRA; 14	ARA; 21	TER	EUR; 11	VAL; 23	POR; 24								25th	10
2021	Moto3	KTM	QAT; Ret	DOH; 19	POR; 19	SPA; 17	FRA; 3	ITA; 18	CAT; DNS	GER; Ret	NED; 18	STY; 23	AUT; 19	GBR; 9	ARA; 15	RSM; 11	AME; 20	EMI; Ret	ALR; 18	VAL; 16					23rd	29
2022	Moto3	Honda	QAT; 12	INA; 17	ARG; 4	AME; 9	POR; 11	SPA; Ret	FRA; 13	ITA; 6	CAT; 11	GER; Ret	NED; 11	GBR; 14	AUT; 19	RSM; 11	ARA; 16	JPN; 10	THA; 3	AUS; 10	MAL; Ret	VAL; Ret			14th	87
2023	Moto3	Honda	POR; 15	ARG; Ret	AME; 15	SPA; Ret	FRA; 16	ITA; 8	GER; 17	NED; 18	GBR; 13	AUT; 6	CAT; 6	RSM; 18	IND; 7	JPN; 13	INA; 13	AUS; 6	THA; 8	MAL; Ret	QAT; 4	VAL; 17			14th	79
2024	Moto3	KTM	QAT; 4	POR; Ret	AME; 16	SPA; 18	FRA; Ret	CAT; Ret	ITA; 13	NED; 18	GER; 19	GBR; 14	AUT; 10	CAT; 20	RSM; Ret	EMI; 23	INA; Ret	JPN; 14	AUS; 12	THA; 13	MAL; Ret	SLD; Ret			18th	33
2025	Moto3	Honda	THA; 8	ARG; 18	AME; Ret	QAT; 5	SPA; Ret	FRA; 18	GBR; 15	ARA; 18	ITA; Ret	NED; 14	GER; 14	CZE; Ret	AUT; 20	HUN; 19	CAT; 16	RSM; 20	JPN; 20	INA; 18	AUS; 25	MAL; 17	POR	VAL	22nd	24

=== Supersport World Championship ===
==== By season ====
Season	Motorcycle	Team	Race	Win	Podium	Pole	FLap	Pts	Plcd
2026	Ducati Panigale V2	Renzi Corse	2	0	0	0	0	0*	24th*
Total			**2**	**0**	**0**	**0**	**0**	**0**	

==== By year ====
(key) (Races in bold indicate pole position; races in italics indicate fastest lap)

Year	Bike	1		2		3		4		5		6		7		8		9		10		11		12		Pos	Pts
Year	Bike	R1	R2	R1	R2	R1	R2	R1	R2	R1	R2	R1	R2	R1	R2	R1	R2	R1	R2	R1	R2	R1	R2	R1	R2	Pos	Pts
2026	Ducati	AUS; 22	AUS; 23	POR; 26	POR; 25	NED; 25	NED; 28	HUN; 23	HUN; 25	CZE; 29	CZE; 25	ARA; 30	ARA; 29													38th*	0*
2026	Yamaha													EMI	EMI	GBR; NC	GBR; NC	FRA	FRA	ITA; 23	ITA; Ret	EST	EST	SPA	SPA	38th*	0*

* Season still in progress.
