= 2019 Thailand motorcycle Grand Prix =

2019 Thailand Grand Prix
Race details
- Race 15 of 19 races in the 2019 Grand Prix motorcycle racing season
- Date: 6 October 2019
- Official name: PTT Thailand Grand Prix
- Location: Chang International Circuit, Buriram, Thailand
- Course: Permanent racing facility; 4.554 km (2.830 mi)

MotoGP
Pole position
Rider	(France) Fabio Quartararo	Yamaha
Time	1:29.719	
Fastest lap
Rider	(Spain) Marc Márquez	Honda
Time	1:30.904 on lap 11	
Podium
First	(Spain) Marc Márquez	Honda
Second	(France) Fabio Quartararo	Yamaha
Third	(Spain) Maverick Viñales	Yamaha

Moto2
Pole position
Rider	(Spain) Álex Márquez	Kalex
Time	1:35.297	
Fastest lap
Rider	(Italy) Luca Marini	Kalex
Time	1:36.097 on lap 6	
Podium
First	(Italy) Luca Marini	Kalex
Second	(South Africa) Brad Binder	KTM
Third	(Spain) Iker Lecuona	KTM

Moto3
Pole position
Rider	(Italy) Celestino Vietti	KTM
Time	1:42.599	
Fastest lap
Rider	(Japan) Ai Ogura	Honda
Time	1:43.222 on lap 10	
Podium
First	(Spain) Albert Arenas	KTM
Second	(Italy) Lorenzo Dalla Porta	Honda
Third	(Spain) Alonso López	Honda

The 2019 Thailand motorcycle Grand Prix was the fifteenth round of the 2019 MotoGP season. It was held at the Chang International Circuit in Buriram on 6 October 2019. Marc Márquez won the MotoGP race, ensuring his sixth world title in the class and fourth in a row.

== Classification ==
=== MotoGP ===
Pos.	No.	Rider	Team	Manufacturer	Laps	Time/Retired	Grid	Points
1	93	(Spain) Marc Márquez	Repsol Honda Team	Honda	26	39:36.223	3	25
2	20	(France) Fabio Quartararo	Petronas Yamaha SRT	Yamaha	26	+0.171	1	20
3	12	(Spain) Maverick Viñales	Monster Energy Yamaha MotoGP	Yamaha	26	+1.380	2	16
4	4	(Italy) Andrea Dovizioso	Ducati Team	Ducati	26	+11.218	7	13
5	42	(Spain) Álex Rins	Team Suzuki Ecstar	Suzuki	26	+11.449	10	11
6	21	(Italy) Franco Morbidelli	Petronas Yamaha SRT	Yamaha	26	+14.466	4	10
7	36	(Spain) Joan Mir	Team Suzuki Ecstar	Suzuki	26	+18.729	8	9
8	46	(Italy) Valentino Rossi	Monster Energy Yamaha MotoGP	Yamaha	26	+19.162	9	8
9	9	(Italy) Danilo Petrucci	Ducati Team	Ducati	26	+23.425	5	7
10	30	(Japan) Takaaki Nakagami	LCR Honda Idemitsu	Honda	26	+29.423	14	6
11	63	(Italy) Francesco Bagnaia	Pramac Racing	Ducati	26	+30.103	15	5
12	35	(United Kingdom) Cal Crutchlow	LCR Honda Castrol	Honda	26	+33.216	13	4
13	44	(Spain) Pol Espargaró	Red Bull KTM Factory Racing	KTM	26	+35.667	11	3
14	43	(Australia) Jack Miller	Pramac Racing	Ducati	26	+39.736	6	2
15	29	(Italy) Andrea Iannone	Aprilia Racing Team Gresini	Aprilia	26	+40.038	16	1
16	88	(Portugal) Miguel Oliveira	Red Bull KTM Tech3	KTM	26	+40.136	17	
17	53	(Spain) Tito Rabat	Reale Avintia Racing	Ducati	26	+44.589	18	
18	99	(Spain) Jorge Lorenzo	Repsol Honda Team	Honda	26	+54.723	19	
19	17	(Czech Republic) Karel Abraham	Reale Avintia Racing	Ducati	26	+56.012	20	
20	55	(Malaysia) Hafizh Syahrin	Red Bull KTM Tech3	KTM	26	+1:01.431	22	
Ret	41	(Spain) Aleix Espargaró	Aprilia Racing Team Gresini	Aprilia	17	Electronics	12	
Ret	82	(Finland) Mika Kallio	Red Bull KTM Factory Racing	KTM	3	Accident	21	

=== Moto2 ===
Pos.	No.	Rider	Manufacturer	Laps	Time/Retired	Grid	Points
1	10	(Italy) Luca Marini	Kalex	24	38:40.882	4	25
2	41	(South Africa) Brad Binder	KTM	24	+2.296	12	20
3	27	(Spain) Iker Lecuona	KTM	24	+2.544	10	16
4	40	(Spain) Augusto Fernández	Kalex	24	+2.585	6	13
5	73	(Spain) Álex Márquez	Kalex	24	+2.919	1	11
6	88	(Spain) Jorge Martín	KTM	24	+6.839	3	10
7	12	(Switzerland) Thomas Lüthi	Kalex	24	+12.500	8	9
8	11	(Italy) Nicolò Bulega	Kalex	24	+13.669	9	8
9	35	(Thailand) Somkiat Chantra	Kalex	24	+14.622	13	7
10	72	(Italy) Marco Bezzecchi	KTM	24	+14.726	17	6
11	33	(Italy) Enea Bastianini	Kalex	24	+14.873	11	5
12	87	(Australia) Remy Gardner	Kalex	24	+15.952	5	4
13	5	(Italy) Andrea Locatelli	Kalex	24	+16.095	15	3
14	23	(Germany) Marcel Schrötter	Kalex	24	+16.603	14	2
15	45	(Japan) Tetsuta Nagashima	Kalex	24	+17.147	2	1
16	77	(Switzerland) Dominique Aegerter	MV Agusta	24	+18.707	22	
17	9	(Spain) Jorge Navarro	Speed Up	24	+20.985	21	
18	21	(Italy) Fabio Di Giannantonio	Speed Up	24	+23.103	18	
19	96	(United Kingdom) Jake Dixon	KTM	24	+25.393	27	
20	64	(Netherlands) Bo Bendsneyder	NTS	24	+27.715	25	
21	2	(Switzerland) Jesko Raffin	NTS	24	+34.863	23	
22	65	(Germany) Philipp Öttl	KTM	24	+35.014	28	
23	47	(Malaysia) Adam Norrodin	Kalex	24	+58.666	32	
24	20	(Indonesia) Dimas Ekky Pratama	Kalex	24	+1:18.435	29	
25	7	(Italy) Lorenzo Baldassarri	Kalex	23	+1 lap	19	
Ret	18	(Andorra) Xavi Cardelús	KTM	23	Handling	31	
Ret	22	(United Kingdom) Sam Lowes	Kalex	17	Accident	16	
Ret	54	(Italy) Mattia Pasini	Kalex	13	Retired	26	
Ret	3	(Germany) Lukas Tulovic	KTM	12	Gear Shifter	30	
Ret	97	(Spain) Xavi Vierge	Kalex	10	Accident	7	
Ret	62	(Italy) Stefano Manzi	MV Agusta	5	Accident	20	
Ret	16	(United States) Joe Roberts	KTM	2	Accident	24	
OFFICIAL MOTO2 REPORT

=== Moto3 ===
Pos.	No.	Rider	Manufacturer	Laps	Time/Retired	Grid	Points
1	75	(Spain) Albert Arenas	KTM	22	38:09.383	3	25
2	48	(Italy) Lorenzo Dalla Porta	Honda	22	+0.231	9	20
3	21	(Spain) Alonso López	Honda	22	+0.322	5	16
4	42	(Spain) Marcos Ramírez	Honda	22	+0.459	2	13
5	7	(Italy) Dennis Foggia	KTM	22	+0.666	11	11
6	13	(Italy) Celestino Vietti	KTM	22	+1.166	1	10
7	27	(Japan) Kaito Toba	Honda	22	+1.228	4	9
8	82	(Italy) Stefano Nepa	KTM	22	+6.971	17	8
9	25	(Spain) Raúl Fernández	KTM	22	+9.095	13	7
10	14	(Italy) Tony Arbolino	Honda	22	+9.145	8	6
11	12	(Czech Republic) Filip Salač	KTM	22	+9.629	26 (Note: Back of the grid start penalty.)	5
12 (Note: 1-position penalty.)	84	(Czech Republic) Jakub Kornfeil	KTM	22	+9.559 (Note: 3-second penalty.)	23 (Note: 12-place grid penalty.)	4
13	54	(Italy) Riccardo Rossi	Honda	22	+11.174	28	3
14	11	(Spain) Sergio García	Honda	22	+14.024	15	2
15	76	(Kazakhstan) Makar Yurchenko	KTM	22	+21.043	24	1
16	32	(Italy) Davide Pizzoli	KTM	22	+23.306	20	
17	3	(Italy) Kevin Zannoni	Honda	22	+23.777	22	
18	22	(Japan) Kazuki Masaki	KTM	22	+23.866	21	
19	53	(Turkey) Deniz Öncü	KTM	22	+55.804 (Note: 43-second penalty.)	19	
20	40	(South Africa) Darryn Binder	KTM	22	+1:05.873	25 (Note: 6-place grid penalty.)	
NC	16	(Italy) Andrea Migno	KTM	22	+3:25.084 (Note: Not classified due to finishing the race through pits.)	7	
NC	44	(Spain) Arón Canet	KTM	18	+4 laps	6	
Ret	79	(Japan) Ai Ogura	Honda	21	Accident	18	
Ret	69	(United Kingdom) Tom Booth-Amos	KTM	21	Mechanical	16	
Ret	10	(Spain) José Julián García	Honda	18	Accident	14	
Ret	71	(Japan) Ayumu Sasaki	Honda	15	Accident	27	
Ret	24	(Japan) Tatsuki Suzuki	Honda	9	Accident Damage	10	
Ret	17	(United Kingdom) John McPhee	Honda	7	Accident	12	
DNS	19	(Argentina) Gabriel Rodrigo	Honda		Did not start		
OFFICIAL MOTO3 REPORT

- Gabriel Rodrigo suffered a broken foot in a crash during warm-up session and was declared unfit to compete.

== Championship standings after the race ==
=== MotoGP ===
Pos.	Rider	Points
1	(Spain) Marc Márquez	325
2	(Italy) Andrea Dovizioso	215
3	(Spain) Álex Rins	167
4	(Spain) Maverick Viñales	163
5	(Italy) Danilo Petrucci	162
6	(Italy) Valentino Rossi	145
7	(France) Fabio Quartararo	143
8	(Australia) Jack Miller	119
9	(United Kingdom) Cal Crutchlow	102
10	(Italy) Franco Morbidelli	90

=== Moto2 ===
Pos.	Rider	Points
1	(Spain) Álex Márquez	224
2	(Spain) Augusto Fernández	184
3	(South Africa) Brad Binder	180
4	(Switzerland) Thomas Lüthi	178
5	(Spain) Jorge Navarro	175
6	(Italy) Luca Marini	151
7	(Italy) Lorenzo Baldassarri	138
8	(Germany) Marcel Schrötter	118
9	(Italy) Fabio Di Giannantonio	94
10	(Italy) Enea Bastianini	86

=== Moto3 ===
Pos.	Rider	Points
1	(Italy) Lorenzo Dalla Porta	204
2	(Spain) Arón Canet	182
3	(Italy) Tony Arbolino	161
4	(Spain) Marcos Ramírez	136
5	(United Kingdom) John McPhee	126
6	(Italy) Niccolò Antonelli	118
7	(Italy) Celestino Vietti	100
8	(Spain) Jaume Masiá	96
9	(Italy) Dennis Foggia	92
10	(Japan) Ai Ogura	86

== Notes ==
Previous race: 2019 Aragon Grand Prix	FIM Grand Prix World Championship; 2019 season	Next race: 2019 Japanese Grand Prix
Previous race: 2018 Thailand Grand Prix	Thailand motorcycle Grand Prix	Next race: 2022 Thailand Grand Prix
