= 2019 Italian motorcycle Grand Prix =

(Italy) 2019 Italian Grand Prix
Race details
- Race 6 of 19 races in the 2019 Grand Prix motorcycle racing season
- Date: 2 June 2019
- Official name: Gran Premio d'Italia Oakley
- Location: Autodromo Internazionale del Mugello, Scarperia, Italy
- Course: Permanent racing facility; 5.245 km (3.259 mi)

MotoGP
Pole position
Rider	(Spain) Marc Márquez	Honda
Time	1:45.519	
Fastest lap
Rider	(Australia) Jack Miller	Ducati
Time	1:47.657 on lap 15	
Podium
First	(Italy) Danilo Petrucci	Ducati
Second	(Spain) Marc Márquez	Honda
Third	(Italy) Andrea Dovizioso	Ducati

Moto2
Pole position
Rider	(Germany) Marcel Schrötter	Kalex
Time	1:51.129	
Fastest lap
Rider	(Spain) Álex Márquez	Kalex
Time	1:51.881 on lap 2	
Podium
First	(Spain) Álex Márquez	Kalex
Second	(Italy) Luca Marini	Kalex
Third	(Switzerland) Thomas Lüthi	Kalex

Moto3
Pole position
Rider	(Italy) Tony Arbolino	Honda
Time	1:56.407	
Fastest lap
Rider	(Italy) Niccolò Antonelli	Honda
Time	1:56.713 on lap 5	
Podium
First	(Italy) Tony Arbolino	Honda
Second	(Italy) Lorenzo Dalla Porta	Honda
Third	(Spain) Jaume Masiá	KTM

The 2019 Italian motorcycle Grand Prix was the sixth round of the 2019 MotoGP season. It was held at the Autodromo Internazionale del Mugello in Scarperia on 2 June 2019.

== Classification ==
=== MotoGP ===
Pos.	No.	Rider	Team	Manufacturer	Laps	Time/Retired	Grid	Points
1	9	(Italy) Danilo Petrucci	Mission Winnow Ducati	Ducati	23	41:33.794	3	25
2	93	(Spain) Marc Márquez	Repsol Honda Team	Honda	23	+0.043	1	20
3	4	(Italy) Andrea Dovizioso	Mission Winnow Ducati	Ducati	23	+0.338	9	16
4	42	(Spain) Álex Rins	Team Suzuki Ecstar	Suzuki	23	+0.535	13	13
5	30	(Japan) Takaaki Nakagami	LCR Honda Idemitsu	Honda	23	+6.535	10	11
6	12	(Spain) Maverick Viñales	Monster Energy Yamaha MotoGP	Yamaha	23	+7.481	7	10
7	51	(Italy) Michele Pirro	Mission Winnow Ducati	Ducati	23	+13.288	12	9
8	35	(United Kingdom) Cal Crutchlow	LCR Honda Castrol	Honda	23	+13.937	6	8
9	44	(Spain) Pol Espargaró	Red Bull KTM Factory Racing	KTM	23	+16.533	11	7
10	20	(France) Fabio Quartararo	Petronas Yamaha SRT	Yamaha	23	+17.994	2	6
11	41	(Spain) Aleix Espargaró	Aprilia Racing Team Gresini	Aprilia	23	+20.523	15	5
12	36	(Spain) Joan Mir	Team Suzuki Ecstar	Suzuki	23	+20.544	20	4
13	99	(Spain) Jorge Lorenzo	Repsol Honda Team	Honda	23	+20.813	17	3
14	17	(Czech Republic) Karel Abraham	Reale Avintia Racing	Ducati	23	+27.298	16	2
15	29	(Italy) Andrea Iannone	Aprilia Racing Team Gresini	Aprilia	23	+28.051	23	1
16	88	(Portugal) Miguel Oliveira	Red Bull KTM Tech3	KTM	23	+30.101	22	
17	5	(France) Johann Zarco	Red Bull KTM Factory Racing	KTM	23	+41.857	19	
Ret	43	(Australia) Jack Miller	Pramac Racing	Ducati	15	Accident	5	
Ret	63	(Italy) Francesco Bagnaia	Pramac Racing	Ducati	11	Accident	8	
Ret	55	(Malaysia) Hafizh Syahrin	Red Bull KTM Tech3	KTM	9	Retired	21	
Ret	46	(Italy) Valentino Rossi	Monster Energy Yamaha MotoGP	Yamaha	7	Accident	18	
Ret	21	(Italy) Franco Morbidelli	Petronas Yamaha SRT	Yamaha	5	Accident	4	
Ret	53	(Spain) Tito Rabat	Reale Avintia Racing	Ducati	0	Electronics	14	

=== Moto2 ===
Pos.	No.	Rider	Manufacturer	Laps	Time/Retired	Grid	Points
1	73	(Spain) Álex Márquez	Kalex	21	39:31.262	3	25
2	10	(Italy) Luca Marini	Kalex	21	+1.928	6	20
3	12	(Switzerland) Thomas Lüthi	Kalex	21	+2.242	2	16
4	7	(Italy) Lorenzo Baldassarri	Kalex	21	+3.653	15	13
5	40	(Spain) Augusto Fernández	Kalex	21	+3.973	9	11
6	33	(Italy) Enea Bastianini	Kalex	21	+3.985	11	10
7	9	(Spain) Jorge Navarro	Speed Up	21	+4.986	5	9
8	23	(Germany) Marcel Schrötter	Kalex	21	+6.215	1	8
9	22	(United Kingdom) Sam Lowes	Kalex	21	+11.466	8	7
10	21	(Italy) Fabio Di Giannantonio	Speed Up	21	+13.050	14	6
11	54	(Italy) Mattia Pasini	Kalex	21	+13.934	18	5
12	97	(Spain) Xavi Vierge	Kalex	21	+17.176	17	4
13	87	(Australia) Remy Gardner	Kalex	21	+19.894	10	3
14	45	(Japan) Tetsuta Nagashima	Kalex	21	+20.055	7	2
15	41	(South Africa) Brad Binder	KTM	21	+20.591	19	1
16	88	(Spain) Jorge Martín	KTM	21	+20.672	12	
17	77	(Switzerland) Dominique Aegerter	MV Agusta	21	+24.081	21	
18	5	(Italy) Andrea Locatelli	Kalex	21	+26.677	16	
19	64	(Netherlands) Bo Bendsneyder	NTS	21	+36.831	20	
20	3	(Germany) Lukas Tulovic	KTM	21	+41.874	24	
21	65	(Germany) Philipp Öttl	KTM	21	+44.611	27	
22	4	(South Africa) Steven Odendaal	NTS	21	+45.131	28	
23	72	(Italy) Marco Bezzecchi	KTM	21	+45.136	25	
24	20	(Indonesia) Dimas Ekky Pratama	Kalex	21	+1:01.819	29	
25	18	(Andorra) Xavi Cardelús	KTM	21	+1:40.942 (Note: 3-second penalty.)	31	
Ret	16	(United States) Joe Roberts	KTM	15	Mechanical	26	
Ret	96	(United Kingdom) Jake Dixon	KTM	10	Accident	30	
Ret	24	(Italy) Simone Corsi	Kalex	8	Accident	13	
Ret	11	(Italy) Nicolò Bulega	Kalex	7	Accident	4	
Ret	62	(Italy) Stefano Manzi	MV Agusta	7	Accident	22	
Ret	19	(Japan) Teppei Nagoe	Kalex	4	Accident	32	
Ret	27	(Spain) Iker Lecuona	KTM	0	Accident	23	
OFFICIAL MOTO2 REPORT

=== Moto3 ===
Pos.	No.	Rider	Manufacturer	Laps	Time/Retired	Grid	Points
1	14	(Italy) Tony Arbolino	Honda	20	39:29.874	1	25
2	48	(Italy) Lorenzo Dalla Porta	Honda	20	+0.029	3	20
3	5	(Spain) Jaume Masiá	KTM	20	+0.078	11	16
4	23	(Italy) Niccolò Antonelli	Honda	20	+0.156	18	13
5	7	(Italy) Dennis Foggia	KTM	20	+0.267	12	11
6	17	(United Kingdom) John McPhee	Honda	20	+0.403	17	10
7	44	(Spain) Arón Canet	KTM	20	+0.559	8	9
8	24	(Japan) Tatsuki Suzuki	Honda	20	+0.595	9	8
9	13	(Italy) Celestino Vietti	KTM	20	+1.566	16	7
10	40	(South Africa) Darryn Binder	KTM	20	+1.597	13	6
11	25	(Spain) Raúl Fernández	KTM	20	+2.519	14	5
12	75	(Spain) Albert Arenas	KTM	20	+2.554	22	4
13	11	(Spain) Sergio García	Honda	20	+2.578	15	3
14	84	(Czech Republic) Jakub Kornfeil	KTM	20	+22.830	20	2
15	76	(Kazakhstan) Makar Yurchenko	KTM	20	+26.669	23	1
16	31	(Indonesia) Gerry Salim	Honda	20	+26.745	26	
17	6	(Japan) Ryusei Yamanaka	Honda	20	+26.777	25	
18	61	(Turkey) Can Öncü	KTM	20	+26.779	31 (Note: 12-place grid penalty.)	
19	77	(Spain) Vicente Pérez	KTM	20	+26.873	27	
20	12	(Czech Republic) Filip Salač	KTM	20	+29.782	28	
21	54	(Italy) Riccardo Rossi	Honda	20	+51.331	30	
Ret	71	(Japan) Ayumu Sasaki	Honda	16	Accident	19	
Ret	27	(Japan) Kaito Toba	Honda	16	Accident	6	
Ret	16	(Italy) Andrea Migno	KTM	15	Accident	4	
Ret	55	(Italy) Romano Fenati	Honda	15	Accident	5	
Ret	42	(Spain) Marcos Ramírez	Honda	11	Mechanical	7	
Ret	69	(United Kingdom) Tom Booth-Amos	KTM	9	Accident	29	
Ret	21	(Spain) Alonso López	Honda	7	Accident	10	
Ret	3	(Italy) Kevin Zannoni	TM	7	Accident	24	
Ret	19	(Argentina) Gabriel Rodrigo	Honda	3	Accident	2	
Ret	22	(Japan) Kazuki Masaki	KTM	2	Accident Damage	21	
OFFICIAL MOTO3 REPORT

== Championship standings after the race ==
=== MotoGP ===
Pos.	Rider	Points
1	(Spain) Marc Márquez	115
2	(Italy) Andrea Dovizioso	103
3	(Spain) Álex Rins	88
4	(Italy) Danilo Petrucci	82
5	(Italy) Valentino Rossi	72
6	(Australia) Jack Miller	42
7	(United Kingdom) Cal Crutchlow	42
8	(Spain) Maverick Viñales	40
9	(Japan) Takaaki Nakagami	40
10	(Spain) Pol Espargaró	38

=== Moto2 ===
Pos.	Rider	Points
1	(Italy) Lorenzo Baldassarri	88
2	(Spain) Álex Márquez	86
3	(Switzerland) Thomas Lüthi	84
4	(Spain) Jorge Navarro	73
5	(Germany) Marcel Schrötter	64
6	(Italy) Luca Marini	58
7	(Spain) Augusto Fernández	54
8	(Italy) Enea Bastianini	45
9	(Australia) Remy Gardner	41
10	(South Africa) Brad Binder	39

=== Moto3 ===
Pos.	Rider	Points
1	(Spain) Arón Canet	83
2	(Italy) Lorenzo Dalla Porta	80
3	(Italy) Niccolò Antonelli	70
4	(Spain) Jaume Masiá	65
5	(Italy) Celestino Vietti	52
6	(Italy) Tony Arbolino	51
7	(Japan) Kaito Toba	51
8	(United Kingdom) John McPhee	44
9	(Italy) Andrea Migno	40
10	(Argentina) Gabriel Rodrigo	37

== Notes ==
Previous race: 2019 French Grand Prix	FIM Grand Prix World Championship; 2019 season	Next race: 2019 Catalan Grand Prix
Previous race: 2018 Italian Grand Prix	Italian motorcycle Grand Prix	Next race: 2021 Italian Grand Prix
