= 2019 French motorcycle Grand Prix =

(France) 2019 French Grand Prix
Race details
- Race 5 of 19 races in the 2019 Grand Prix motorcycle racing season
- Date: 19 May 2019
- Official name: Shark Helmets Grand Prix de France
- Location: Bugatti Circuit, Le Mans, France
- Course: Permanent racing facility; 4.185 km (2.600 mi)

MotoGP
Pole position
Rider	(Spain) Marc Márquez	Honda
Time	1:40.952	
Fastest lap
Rider	(France) Fabio Quartararo	Yamaha
Time	1:32.355 on lap 20	
Podium
First	(Spain) Marc Márquez	Honda
Second	(Italy) Andrea Dovizioso	Ducati
Third	(Italy) Danilo Petrucci	Ducati

Moto2
Pole position
Rider	(Spain) Jorge Navarro	Speed Up
Time	1:49.055	
Fastest lap
Rider	(Spain) Jorge Navarro	Speed Up
Time	1:36.764 on lap 25	
Podium
First	(Spain) Álex Márquez	Kalex
Second	(Spain) Jorge Navarro	Speed Up
Third	(Spain) Augusto Fernández	Kalex

Moto3
Pole position
Rider	(United Kingdom) John McPhee	Honda
Time	1:42.277	
Fastest lap
Rider	(Spain) Jaume Masiá	KTM
Time	1:42.196 on lap 7	
Podium
First	(United Kingdom) John McPhee	Honda
Second	(Italy) Lorenzo Dalla Porta	Honda
Third	(Spain) Arón Canet	KTM

The 2019 French motorcycle Grand Prix was the fifth round of the 2019 MotoGP season. It was held at the Bugatti Circuit in Le Mans on 19 May 2019.

== Classification ==
=== MotoGP ===
Pos.	No.	Rider	Team	Manufacturer	Laps	Time/Retired	Grid	Points
1	93	(Spain) Marc Márquez	Repsol Honda Team	Honda	27	41:53.647	1	25
2	4	(Italy) Andrea Dovizioso	Ducati Team	Ducati	27	+1.984	4	20
3	9	(Italy) Danilo Petrucci	Ducati Team	Ducati	27	+2.142	2	16
4	43	(Australia) Jack Miller	Pramac Racing	Ducati	27	+2.940	3	13
5	46	(Italy) Valentino Rossi	Monster Energy Yamaha MotoGP	Yamaha	27	+3.053	5	11
6	44	(Spain) Pol Espargaró	Red Bull KTM Factory Racing	KTM	27	+5.935	12	10
7	21	(Italy) Franco Morbidelli	Petronas Yamaha SRT	Yamaha	27	+7.187	6	9
8	20	(France) Fabio Quartararo	Petronas Yamaha SRT	Yamaha	27	+8.439	10	8
9	35	(United Kingdom) Cal Crutchlow	LCR Honda Castrol	Honda	27	+9.853	15	7
10	42	(Spain) Álex Rins	Team Suzuki Ecstar	Suzuki	27	+13.709	19	6
11	99	(Spain) Jorge Lorenzo	Repsol Honda Team	Honda	27	+15.003	8	5
12	41	(Spain) Aleix Espargaró	Aprilia Racing Team Gresini	Aprilia	27	+29.512 (Note: 1.4-second penalty.)	9	4
13	5	(France) Johann Zarco	Red Bull KTM Factory Racing	KTM	27	+33.061	14	3
14	55	(Malaysia) Hafizh Syahrin	Red Bull KTM Tech3	KTM	27	+35.481	21	2
15	88	(Portugal) Miguel Oliveira	Red Bull KTM Tech3	KTM	27	+36.044 (Note: 1.5-second penalty.)	16	1
16	36	(Spain) Joan Mir	Team Suzuki Ecstar	Suzuki	26	+1 lap	18^{1}	
Ret	30	(Japan) Takaaki Nakagami	LCR Honda Idemitsu	Honda	18	Accident	7	
Ret	29	(Italy) Andrea Iannone	Aprilia Racing Team Gresini	Aprilia	8	Ankle Pain	22	
Ret	12	(Spain) Maverick Viñales	Monster Energy Yamaha MotoGP	Yamaha	6	Accident	11	
Ret	63	(Italy) Francesco Bagnaia	Pramac Racing	Ducati	6	Accident	13	
Ret	53	(Spain) Tito Rabat	Reale Avintia Racing	Ducati	2	Mechanical	20	
DSQ	17	(Czech Republic) Karel Abraham	Reale Avintia Racing	Ducati	5	Black flag	17^{1}	
Sources:

- ^1 – Karel Abraham and Joan Mir started the race from the pit lane for crash during warm-up lap. His place of grid was left vacant.
- Karel Abraham was black-flagged for leaving pit lane aboard a spare bike after leader crossed the finish line at the end of lap 1.

=== Moto2 ===
Pos.	No.	Rider	Manufacturer	Laps	Time/Retired	Grid	Points
1	73	(Spain) Álex Márquez	Kalex	25	40:36.428	3	25
2	9	(Spain) Jorge Navarro	Speed Up	25	+1.119	1	20
3	40	(Spain) Augusto Fernández	Kalex	25	+1.800	14	16
4	41	(South Africa) Brad Binder	KTM	25	+6.015	8	13
5	97	(Spain) Xavi Vierge	Kalex	25	+7.057	5	11
6	12	(Switzerland) Thomas Lüthi	Kalex	25	+9.401	2	10
7	33	(Italy) Enea Bastianini	Kalex	25	+10.095	16	9
8	23	(Germany) Marcel Schrötter	Kalex	25	+10.475	10	8
9	27	(Spain) Iker Lecuona	KTM	25	+11.246	22	7
10	11	(Italy) Nicolò Bulega	Kalex	25	+17.112	15	6
11	45	(Japan) Tetsuta Nagashima	Kalex	25	+18.537	31	5
12	21	(Italy) Fabio Di Giannantonio	Speed Up	25	+19.817	20	4
13	10	(Italy) Luca Marini	Kalex	25	+27.815	19	3
14	16	(United States) Joe Roberts	KTM	25	+27.888	29	2
15	62	(Italy) Stefano Manzi	MV Agusta	25	+49.139	24	1
16	3	(Germany) Lukas Tulovic	KTM	25	+50.800	9	
17	96	(United Kingdom) Jake Dixon	KTM	25	+51.688 (Note: 1.2-second penalty.)	11	
18	72	(Italy) Marco Bezzecchi	KTM	25	+53.223	27	
19	65	(Germany) Philipp Öttl	KTM	25	+1:00.859	32	
20	88	(Spain) Jorge Martín	KTM	25	+1:03.717	13	
Ret	77	(Switzerland) Dominique Aegerter	MV Agusta	24	Out Of Fuel	25	
Ret	20	(Indonesia) Dimas Ekky Pratama	Kalex	21	Accident	28	
Ret	18	(Andorra) Xavi Cardelús	KTM	20	Wrist Pain (Note: 2.2-second penalty.)	30	
Ret	87	(Australia) Remy Gardner	Kalex	13	Accident	12	
Ret	4	(South Africa) Steven Odendaal	NTS	12	Accident	21	
Ret	64	(Netherlands) Bo Bendsneyder	NTS	12	Rear Tyre Wear	17	
Ret	24	(Italy) Simone Corsi	Kalex	9	Accident	18	
Ret	22	(United Kingdom) Sam Lowes	Kalex	8	Accident	26	
Ret	35	(Thailand) Somkiat Chantra	Kalex	8	Accident	23	
Ret	7	(Italy) Lorenzo Baldassarri	Kalex	1	Accident	7	
Ret	54	(Italy) Mattia Pasini	Kalex	1	Accident	4	
Ret	5	(Italy) Andrea Locatelli	Kalex	0	Accident	6	
OFFICIAL MOTO2 REPORT

=== Moto3 ===
Pos.	No.	Rider	Manufacturer	Laps	Time/Retired	Grid	Points
1	17	(United Kingdom) John McPhee	Honda	22	37:48.689	1	25
2	48	(Italy) Lorenzo Dalla Porta	Honda	22	+0.106	13	20
3	44	(Spain) Arón Canet	KTM	22	+0.757	12	16
4	19	(Argentina) Gabriel Rodrigo	Honda	22	+0.978	5	13
5	16	(Italy) Andrea Migno	KTM	22	+1.201	9	11
6	27	(Japan) Kaito Toba	Honda	22	+1.410	8	10
7	13	(Italy) Celestino Vietti	KTM	22	+1.451	19	9
8	22	(Japan) Kazuki Masaki	KTM	22	+1.636	15	8
9	84	(Czech Republic) Jakub Kornfeil	KTM	22	+1.848	21	7
10	25	(Spain) Raúl Fernández	KTM	22	+2.049	20 (Note: 12-place grid penalty.)	6
11	75	(Spain) Albert Arenas	KTM	22	+2.663	14	5
12	5	(Spain) Jaume Masiá	KTM	22	+3.748	23	4
13	76	(Kazakhstan) Makar Yurchenko	KTM	22	+11.812	10	3
14	71	(Japan) Ayumu Sasaki	Honda	22	+11.896	24	2
15	12	(Czech Republic) Filip Salač	KTM	22	+30.511	18	1
16	61	(Turkey) Can Öncü	KTM	22	+32.544	27	
17	69	(United Kingdom) Tom Booth-Amos	KTM	22	+40.026 (Note: 3.9-second penalty.)	28	
Ret	7	(Italy) Dennis Foggia	KTM	17	Accident (Note: 1.9-second penalty.)	16	
Ret	21	(Spain) Alonso López	Honda	17	Accident	17	
Ret	24	(Japan) Tatsuki Suzuki	Honda	17	Accident Damage	4	
Ret	14	(Italy) Tony Arbolino	Honda	16	Accident	2	
Ret	77	(Spain) Vicente Pérez	KTM	15	Accident	25	
Ret	23	(Italy) Niccolò Antonelli	Honda	14	Accident	7	
Ret	55	(Italy) Romano Fenati	Honda	9	Rider In Pain	11	
Ret	42	(Spain) Marcos Ramírez	Honda	7	Accident	6	
Ret	54	(Italy) Riccardo Rossi	Honda	6	Accident	26	
Ret	40	(South Africa) Darryn Binder	KTM	1	Accident	29	
Ret	79	(Japan) Ai Ogura	Honda	0	Accident	3	
Ret	11	(Spain) Sergio García	Honda	0	Accident	22	
OFFICIAL MOTO3 REPORT

== Championship standings after the race ==
=== MotoGP ===
Pos.	Rider	Points
1	(Spain) Marc Márquez	95
2	(Italy) Andrea Dovizioso	87
3	(Spain) Álex Rins	75
4	(Italy) Valentino Rossi	72
5	(Italy) Danilo Petrucci	57
6	(Australia) Jack Miller	42
7	(United Kingdom) Cal Crutchlow	34
8	(Italy) Franco Morbidelli	34
9	(Spain) Pol Espargaró	31
10	(Spain) Maverick Viñales	30

=== Moto2 ===
Pos.	Rider	Points
1	(Italy) Lorenzo Baldassarri	75
2	(Switzerland) Thomas Lüthi	68
3	(Spain) Jorge Navarro	64
4	(Spain) Álex Márquez	61
5	(Germany) Marcel Schrötter	56
6	(Spain) Augusto Fernández	43
7	(Australia) Remy Gardner	38
8	(South Africa) Brad Binder	38
9	(Italy) Luca Marini	38
10	(Italy) Enea Bastianini	35

=== Moto3 ===
Pos.	Rider	Points
1	(Spain) Arón Canet	74
2	(Italy) Lorenzo Dalla Porta	60
3	(Italy) Niccolò Antonelli	57
4	(Japan) Kaito Toba	51
5	(Spain) Jaume Masiá	49
6	(Italy) Celestino Vietti	45
7	(Italy) Andrea Migno	40
8	(Argentina) Gabriel Rodrigo	37
9	(United Kingdom) John McPhee	34
10	(South Africa) Darryn Binder	26

== Notes ==
Previous race: 2019 Spanish Grand Prix	FIM Grand Prix World Championship; 2019 season	Next race: 2019 Italian Grand Prix
Previous race: 2018 French Grand Prix	French motorcycle Grand Prix	Next race: 2020 French Grand Prix
