= RNF Racing =

Malaysian Grand Prix motorcycle racing team

- 2023 name: MotoGP: CryptoData RNF MotoGP Team; MotoE: RNF MotoE Team
- Base: Sepang, Malaysia

RNF Racing was a Malaysian Grand Prix motorcycle racing team that competed in the 2022 and 2023 seasons. The team last competed with Aprilia motorcycles in the MotoGP class as a satellite team under the name CryptoData RNF MotoGP Team, and in MotoE under the name RNF MotoE Team.

== History ==
The team's origins began with the Sepang Racing Team (SRT) under ownership by the Sepang International Circuit and managed by circuit CEO Razlan Razali and former racers Johan Stigefelt and Wilco Zeelenberg. During the 2021 season, the principal sponsor Petronas announced they would be removing their support for the team at the end of the season, and shortly thereafter SRT announced they would cease all racing activities at the end of the season. Control of the team and its assets were taken over by Razali and Stigefelt to create the rebranded RNF Racing team, with an agreement from Dorna Sports for a grid slot at least until the end of 2026. Razali confirmed the significance of the team name as coming from the initials of his family name as well as the names of his children (Razali, Nadia and Farouk). On 30 October, RNF announced that Stigefelt would split from the team under "mutual agreement".

The team continued in 2022 under a number of SRT's previous agreements, with Italian rider Andrea Dovizioso on a factory-specification Yamaha YZR-M1. Darryn Binder was promoted from the Moto3 Petronas Sprinta Racing team as the team's second rider, aboard a 2021-specification Yamaha machine. Naming rights for the team were secured by Italian energy and telecommunications brand WithU in early 2022, and the team raced under the name WithU Yamaha RNF MotoGP Racing.

On 27 May 2022, it was announced that the team would use Aprilia bikes starting with the 2023 season. In November 2022, it was announced that Romanian blockchain company CryptoDATA Tech had purchased a majority stake in the team which would be named CryptoDATA RNF MotoGP Team for 2023. Riders Miguel Oliveira and Raúl Fernández joined from the KTM stable.

On 27 November 2023, the MotoGP Selection Committee announced that CryptoDATA RNF would not be permitted participation in the 2024 MotoGP championship, citing repeated infractions and breaches of the Participation Agreement. Trackhouse Racing was later announced to take over RNF's grid slot from the 2024 season.

== Results ==
=== By season ===
Year	Class	Team name	Bike	Riders	Races	Wins	Podiums	Poles	F. laps	Points	Pos.
2022	MotoGP	WithU Yamaha RNF MotoGP Team	Yamaha YZR-M1	(Italy) Andrea Dovizioso	14	0	0	0	0	15	21st
2022	MotoGP	WithU Yamaha RNF MotoGP Team	Yamaha YZR-M1	(South Africa) Darryn Binder	20	0	0	0	0	12	24th
2022	MotoGP	WithU Yamaha RNF MotoGP Team	Yamaha YZR-M1	(United Kingdom) Cal Crutchlow	6	0	0	0	0	10	25th
2022	MotoE	WithU GRT RNF MotoE Team	Energica Ego Corsa	(Italy) Niccolò Canepa	12	0	1	0	0	94.5	7th
2022	MotoE	WithU GRT RNF MotoE Team	Energica Ego Corsa	(Italy) Andrea Mantovani	4	0	0	0	1	25	16th
2022	MotoE	WithU GRT RNF MotoE Team	Energica Ego Corsa	(Germany) Lukas Tulovic	2	0	0	0	0	10	19th
2022	MotoE	WithU GRT RNF MotoE Team	Energica Ego Corsa	(United Kingdom) Bradley Smith	6	0	0	0	0	12	18th
2023	MotoGP	CryptoDATA RNF MotoGP Team	Aprilia RS-GP22	(Spain) Raúl Fernández	19	0	0	0	0	51	20th
2023	MotoGP	CryptoDATA RNF MotoGP Team	Aprilia RS-GP22	(Italy) Lorenzo Savadori	2	0	0	0	0	7 (12) (Note: Non-bracketed number refers to the number accumulated with the motorcycle, with number in brackets referring to the total accumulated for the season.)	24th
2023	MotoGP	CryptoDATA RNF MotoGP Team	Aprilia RS-GP22	(Portugal) Miguel Oliveira	18	0	0	0	0	76	16th
2023	MotoE	RNF MotoE Team	Ducati V21L	(Italy) Andrea Mantovani	16	2	3	0	0	138	8th
2023	MotoE	RNF MotoE Team	Ducati V21L	(Spain) Mika Pérez	16	0	0	0	0	53	15th

=== MotoGP results ===
(key) (Races in bold indicate pole position; races in italics indicate fastest lap)

Year	Motorcycle	Name	Tyres	Riders	1	2	3	4	5	6	7	8	9	10	11	12	13	14	15	16	17	18	19	20	Points	RC	Points	TC	Points	MC
2022	Yamaha YZR-M1	WithU Yamaha RNF MotoGP Team	M		QAT	INA	ARG	AME	POR	SPA	FRA	ITA	CAT	GER	NED	GBR	AUT	RSM	ARA	JPN	THA	AUS	MAL	VAL						
2022	Yamaha YZR-M1	WithU Yamaha RNF MotoGP Team	M	(Italy) Andrea Dovizioso	14	Ret	20	15	11	17	16	20	Ret	14	16	16	15	12							15	21st	37	11th	256	2nd
2022	Yamaha YZR-M1	WithU Yamaha RNF MotoGP Team	M	(United Kingdom) Cal Crutchlow															14	15	19	13	12	16	10	25th	37	11th	256	2nd
2022	Yamaha YZR-M1	WithU Yamaha RNF MotoGP Team	M	(South Africa) Darryn Binder	16	10	18	22	17	Ret	17	16	12	Ret	Ret	20	Ret	16	18	Ret	21	14	Ret	Ret	12	24th	37	11th	256	2nd
2023	Aprilia RS-GP	CryptoData RNF MotoGP Team	M		POR	ARG	AME	SPA	FRA	ITA	GER	NED	GBR	AUT	CAT	RSM	IND	JPN	INA	AUS	THA	MAL	QAT	VAL						
2023	Aprilia RS-GP	CryptoData RNF MotoGP Team	M	(Spain) Raúl Fernández	Ret	14	Ret	15	WD	17	15	12	10	Ret	Ret	8	10**^{9}**	9	13	16	15	Ret	17	5	51	20th	134	8th	326	3rd
2023	Aprilia RS-GP	CryptoData RNF MotoGP Team	M	(Italy) Lorenzo Savadori					12															13	7 (12)	24th	134	8th	326	3rd
2023	Aprilia RS-GP	CryptoData RNF MotoGP Team	M	(Portugal) Miguel Oliveira	Ret**^{7}**		5**^{8}**	Ret**^{5}**		Ret	10	Ret	4	Ret	5**^{6}**	6	12	18	12	13	Ret	Ret	DNS		76	16th	134	8th	326	3rd
