= 2022 MotoGP World Championship =

74th running of the MotoGP World Championship

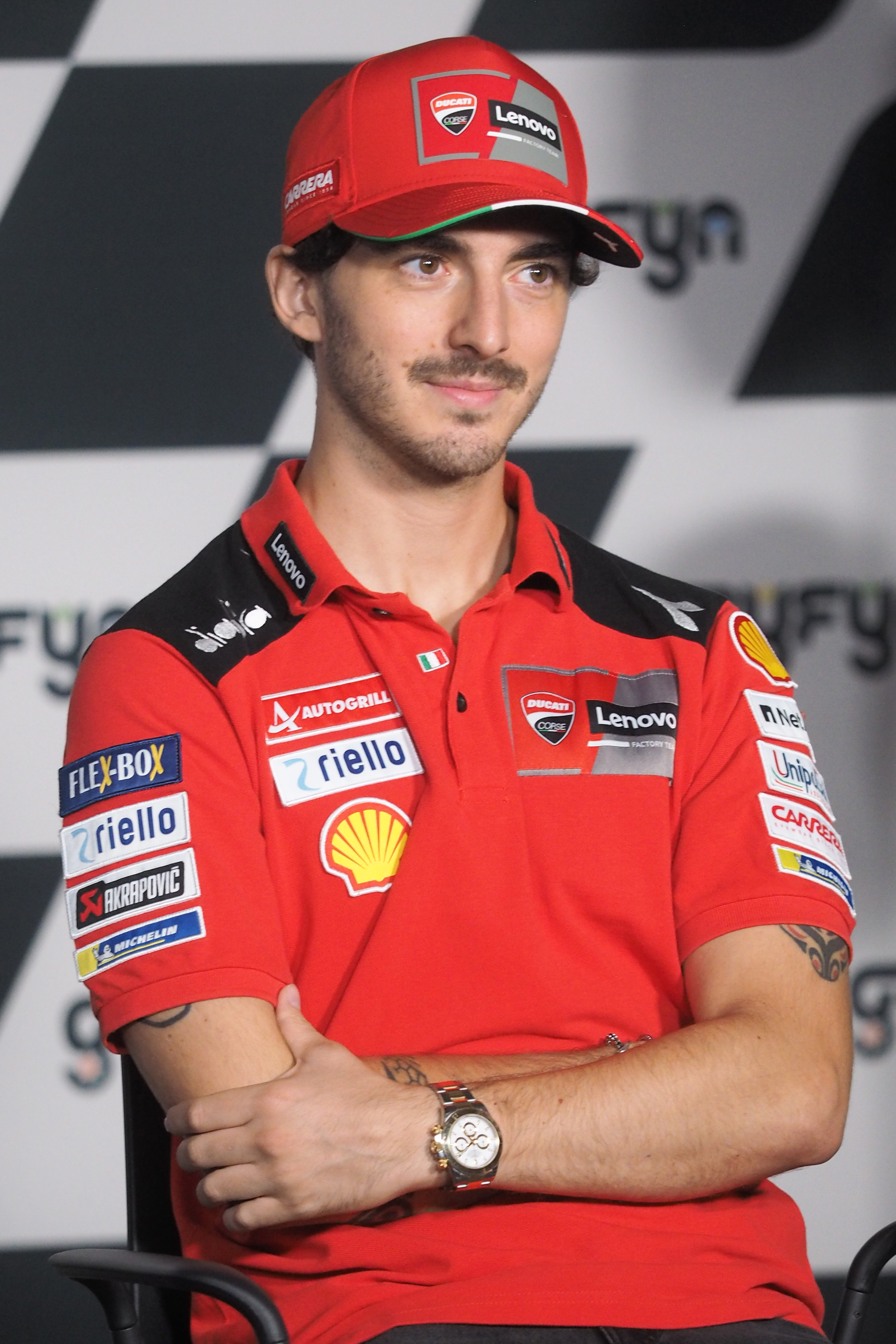
Francesco Bagnaia was the 2022 MotoGP World Riders' Champion.

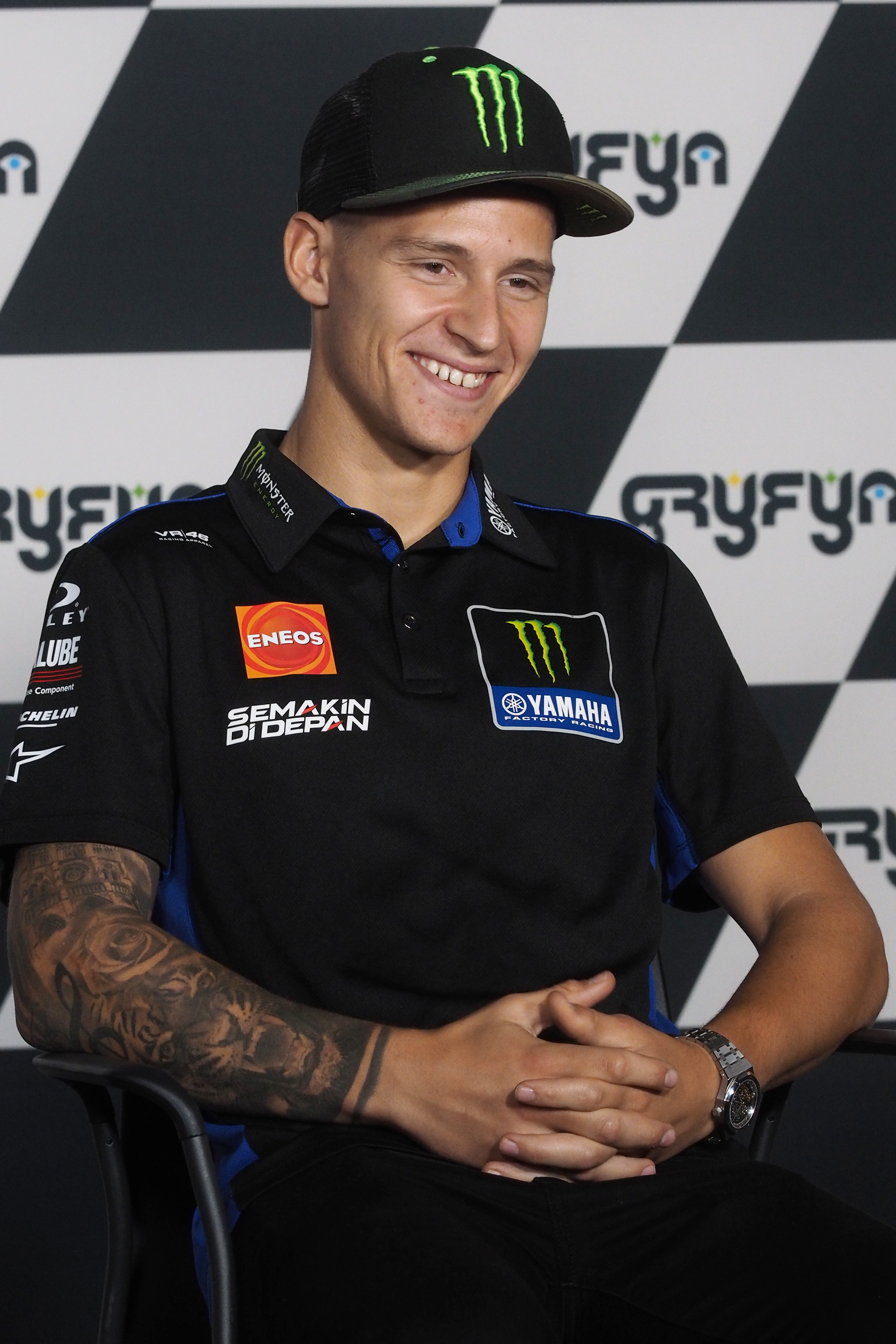
Defending champion Fabio Quartararo finished runner-up.

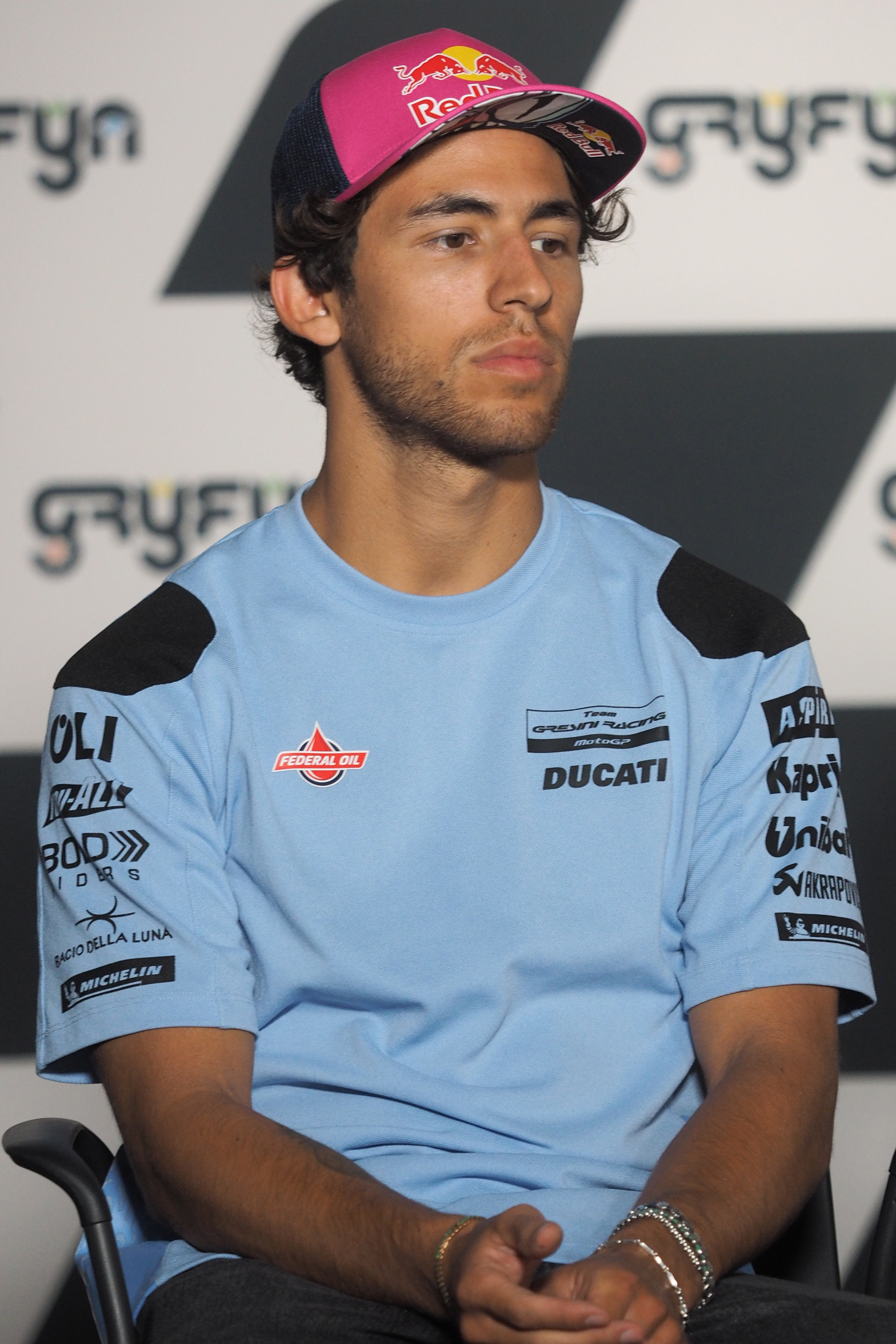
Enea Bastianini finished third.

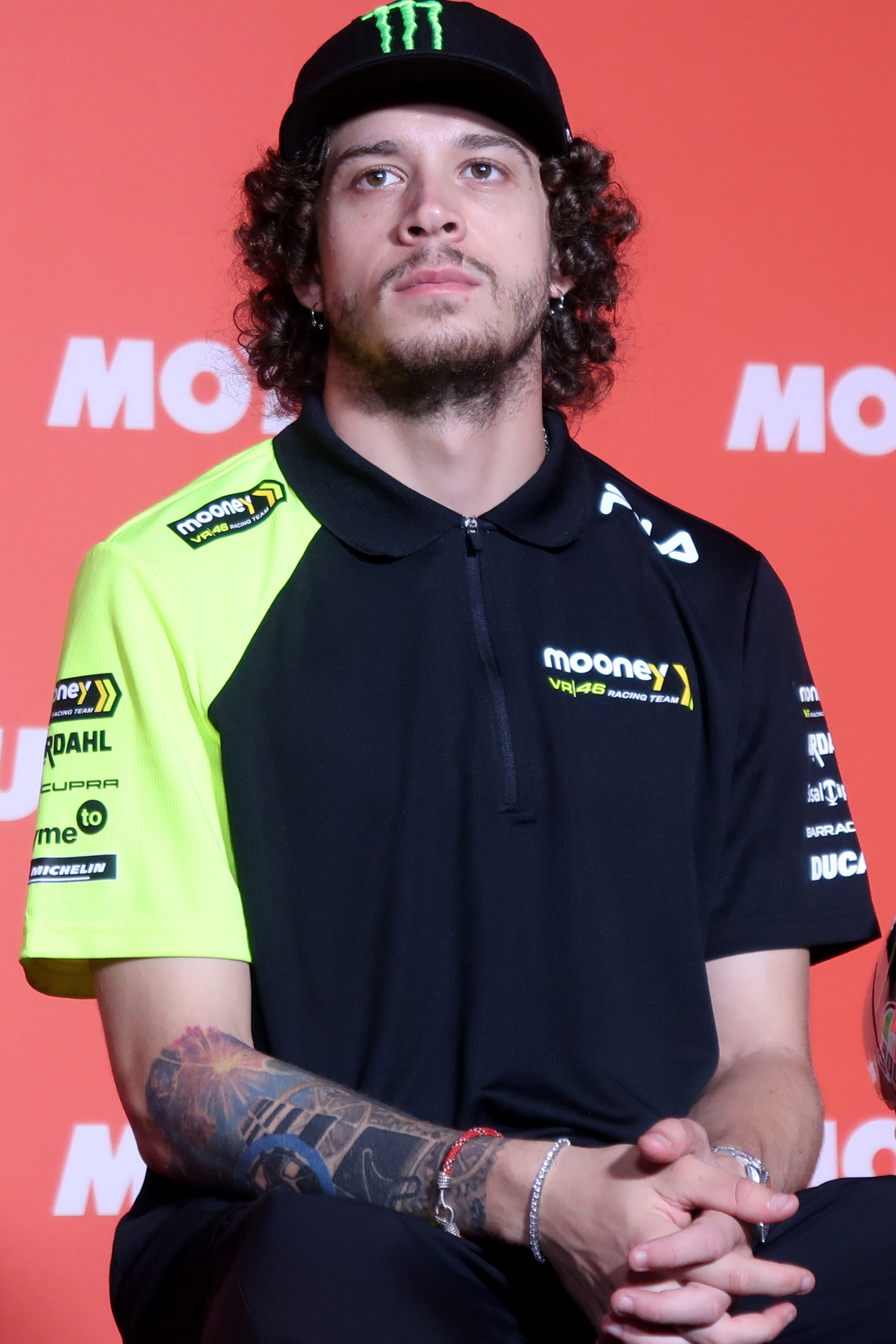
Marco Bezzecchi (pictured in 2023), the 2022 MotoGP Rookie of the Year.

The 2022 FIM MotoGP World Championship was the premier class of the 74th Fédération Internationale de Motocyclisme (FIM) Road Racing World Championship season, the highest level of competition in motorcycle road racing. Fabio Quartararo came into the season as the defending World Champion. Ducati secured the constructors' championship, with the factory Ducati Lenovo Team securing the teams' championship and factory rider Francesco Bagnaia achieving the riders' championship. In total, seven different riders and five manufacturers won Grands Prix during the season. As the only manufacturer without a victory, the season saw Honda finish in last place of the manufacturers' standings for the first time in the modern MotoGP era.

== Season summary ==
The opening round in Qatar was won by Ducati satellite rider Enea Bastianini for Gresini Racing, marking the rider's inaugural premier class victory, and the first for the team since 2006. The return of the Indonesian Grand Prix to the championship in the second round was marked by a wet-weather win for Miguel Oliviera and KTM. The third round of the season in Argentina saw Aleix Espargaró take the checkered flag for Aprilia, his first race win in any world championship class and the first ever for Aprilia in the premier class. At the Grand Prix of the Americas, Bastianini scored his second win of the season to enter the European season of the championship as leader for the riders' title.

Defending champion Fabio Quartararo took his first win of the season at Portugal, to take lead of the riders' standings. In Jerez, Ducati rider Francesco Bagnaia dominated, taking his first win of the season starting from pole and leading all laps, to mark the second grand chelem of his career. With consecutive third place finishes for Aleix Espargaró in Portimão and Jerez adding to their Argentine victory and a podium finish in 2021, Aprilia lost their manufacturer's concessions that aim for underforming manufacturers to gain slight advantages for 2023. Enea Bastianini took his third victory of the season in France after pressuring Ducati works rider Bagnaia into a late race error, while Espargaró and Aprilia took to the third step of the podium for the third race in succession. At Mugello, Bagnaia and factory Ducati took their second victory of the season in front of a home crowd, ahead of championship leader Quartararo in second, and Espargaró taking his fourth consecutive third-place finish.

Quartararo took his second victory of the season to extend his championship lead in Catalunya. His primary title rival Espargaró dropped from second position (for potentially his fifth consecutive podium finish) to fifth place on the final lap, after miscounting the laps remaining. Quartararo won for the third time in Germany, and the reigning world champion held a 91-point lead over rival Francesco Bagnaia after the German Grand Prix, a seemingly impregnable gap to overcome in the remaining 10 races. Bagnaia took his third win in Assen however, while title front-runners Quartararo and Espargaró clashed on the fifth lap, resulting in the Frenchman retiring from the race while the Spaniard recovered to finish in fourth place. Quartararo was later handed a long lap penalty for the crash, which was to be served at the next round at Silverstone. Heading into the summer break, Quartararo led the riders' championship, while Ducati led the manufacturers' championship and Aprilia Racing the teams' championship.

Returning in Britain, Bagnaia took his fourth win of the season to lessen the gap to championship frontrunners Quartararo and Espargaró, who struggled to 8th and 9th place finishes respectively. In Austria, Enea Bastianini took his first career pole position, before crashing out on lap 6 due to issues with a bent front wheel rim. Bagnaia led from the first lap to take his third consecutive victory ahead of Quartararo. At the San Marino round, Bagnaia took his fourth straight win to shorten Quartararo's advantage to 30 points with six rounds remaining, and beat Casey Stoner's record for consecutive wins for a Ducati rider. Marc Márquez returned to the championship in Aragón after a three-and-a-half month absence due to surgery, but was involved in a pair of first-lap incidents which saw himself, championship leader Quartararo and fellow Honda rider Takaaki Nakagami retire from the race. The race was won by Bastianini on a last-lap overtake of Bagnaia, to take his fourth victory of the season and end Bagnaia's win streak. With this their tenth victory of the season, Ducati clinched the manufacturers' championship for the third consecutive season with five races remaining.

In Japan, Marc Márquez took pole position in a wet qualifying session, his first pole in 1071 days since the previous Japanese Grand Prix in 2019. In the race, the championship frontrunners struggled, with Francesco Bagnaia crashing out in a final lap attempt to overtake Fabio Quartararo for 8th position, while Aleix Espargaro started the race from the pit lane due to a bike swap after the sighting lap and could only recover to 16th place. Jack Miller took the lead from 7th on the grid on the third lap and led to the finish line ahead of Brad Binder and Jorge Martín. At the Thai round, rookie Marco Bezzecchi took his maiden pole position and thus set a new MotoGP record for unique pole sitters in a season at 10. For the second time in the season, Miguel Oliveira rode his KTM to a race win in the wet. Quartararo struggled to finish in 17th place while Bagnaia achieved a podium finish to cut Quartararo's lead to just 2 points with three rounds remaining. In Australia, Álex Rins crossed the line first in a group of seven riders separated by fewer than 0.9 seconds to take Suzuki's first win of their final season. Quartararo crashed out of the race while Bagnaia finished in third, resulting in Bagnaia taking over the championship lead for the first time in the season. At the Malaysian race, Bagnaia took the win ahead of Bastianini and Quartararo, meaning the title decision would go down to the final round in Valencia. Rins took his second win of the season in Valencia for Suzuki's final race in the MotoGP championship. After a second-lap collision between the two title leaders, Quartararo managed to finish only in 4th place while Bagnaia achieved 9th, sufficient for him to take Ducati's first riders' championship since Casey Stoner in 2007. At the time, the 91-point gap that Bagnaia overturned was the largest in MotoGP history, only later beaten in 2026 when Marc Márquez overcame a 102-point deficit to take the championship lead following Misano.

== Teams and riders ==
| Team | Constructor | Motorcycle | No. | Rider | Rounds |
|---|---|---|---|---|---|
| (Italy) Aprilia Racing | Aprilia | RS-GP | 12 | (Spain) Maverick Viñales | All |
| (Italy) Aprilia Racing | Aprilia | RS-GP | 41 | (Spain) Aleix Espargaró | All |
| (Italy) Aprilia Racing | Aprilia | RS-GP | 32 | (Italy) Lorenzo Savadori | 5–6, 8, 11, 13 |
| (Italy) Ducati Lenovo Team | Ducati | Desmosedici GP22 | 43 | (Australia) Jack Miller | All |
| (Italy) Ducati Lenovo Team | Ducati | Desmosedici GP22 | 63 | (Italy) Francesco Bagnaia | All |
| (Italy) Aruba.it Racing | Ducati | Desmosedici GP22 | 51 | (Italy) Michele Pirro | 8–9, 14 |
| (Italy) Gresini Racing MotoGP | Ducati | Desmosedici GP21 | 23 | (Italy) Enea Bastianini | All |
| (Italy) Gresini Racing MotoGP | Ducati | Desmosedici GP21 | 49 | (Italy) Fabio Di Giannantonio | All |
| (Italy) Mooney VR46 Racing Team | Ducati | Desmosedici GP22 | 10 | (Italy) Luca Marini | All |
| (Italy) Mooney VR46 Racing Team | Ducati | Desmosedici GP21 | 72 | (Italy) Marco Bezzecchi | All |
| (Italy) Pramac Racing (Note: From round 8 onwards, the team used the team name Prima Pramac Racing.) | Ducati | Desmosedici GP22 | 5 | (France) Johann Zarco | All |
| (Italy) Pramac Racing | Ducati | Desmosedici GP22 | 89 | (Spain) Jorge Martín | All |
| (Monaco) LCR Honda Idemitsu (Monaco) LCR Honda Castrol | Honda | RC213V | 30 | (Japan) Takaaki Nakagami | 1–16, 20 |
| (Monaco) LCR Honda Idemitsu (Monaco) LCR Honda Castrol | Honda | RC213V | 45 | (Japan) Tetsuta Nagashima | 17–19 |
| (Monaco) LCR Honda Idemitsu (Monaco) LCR Honda Castrol | Honda | RC213V | 73 | (Spain) Álex Márquez | All |
| (Japan) Repsol Honda Team | Honda | RC213V | 44 | (Spain) Pol Espargaró | All |
| (Japan) Repsol Honda Team | Honda | RC213V | 93 | (Spain) Marc Márquez | 1–2, 4–8, 15–20 |
| (Japan) Repsol Honda Team | Honda | RC213V | 6 | (Germany) Stefan Bradl | 3, 9–14 |
| (Japan) Team HRC (Japan) HRC Team | Honda | RC213V | 6 | (Germany) Stefan Bradl | 6 |
| (Japan) Team HRC (Japan) HRC Team | Honda | RC213V | 45 | (Japan) Tetsuta Nagashima | 16 |
| (Austria) Red Bull KTM Factory Racing | KTM | RC16 | 33 | (South Africa) Brad Binder | All |
| (Austria) Red Bull KTM Factory Racing | KTM | RC16 | 88 | (Portugal) Miguel Oliveira | All |
| (France) Tech3 KTM Factory Racing | KTM | RC16 | 25 | (Spain) Raúl Fernández | All |
| (France) Tech3 KTM Factory Racing | KTM | RC16 | 87 | (Australia) Remy Gardner | All |
| (Japan) Team Suzuki Ecstar | Suzuki | GSX-RR | 36 | (Spain) Joan Mir | 1–13, 15, 18–20 |
| (Japan) Team Suzuki Ecstar | Suzuki | GSX-RR | 92 | (Japan) Kazuki Watanabe | 14 |
| (Japan) Team Suzuki Ecstar | Suzuki | GSX-RR | 85 | (Japan) Takuya Tsuda | 16 |
| (Japan) Team Suzuki Ecstar | Suzuki | GSX-RR | 9 | (Italy) Danilo Petrucci | 17 |
| (Japan) Team Suzuki Ecstar | Suzuki | GSX-RR | 42 | (Spain) Álex Rins | All |
| (Japan) Monster Energy Yamaha MotoGP | Yamaha | YZR-M1 | 20 | (France) Fabio Quartararo | All |
| (Japan) Monster Energy Yamaha MotoGP | Yamaha | YZR-M1 | 21 | (Italy) Franco Morbidelli | All |
| (Malaysia) WithU Yamaha RNF MotoGP Team | Yamaha | YZR-M1 | 04 | (Italy) Andrea Dovizioso | 1–14 |
| (Malaysia) WithU Yamaha RNF MotoGP Team | Yamaha | YZR-M1 | 35 | (United Kingdom) Cal Crutchlow | 15–20 |
| (Malaysia) WithU Yamaha RNF MotoGP Team | Yamaha | YZR-M1 | 40 | (South Africa) Darryn Binder | All |

Key
Regular rider
Replacement rider
Wildcard rider

All teams used series-specified Michelin tyres.

=== Team changes ===
- Aprilia entered the series with their own full factory team effort for the first time since 2004. Aprilia had previously sponsored and supplied bikes with factory support to the Gresini Racing team beginning in 2015.
- VR46 Racing Team entered the championship, taking over the grid slots from Esponsorama Racing who left the premier class after 10 seasons. The team is using Ducati machinery until at least the end of 2024.
- Gresini Racing made their return as a fully-independent team with their bikes being supplied by Ducati.
- Petronas SRT quit the sport after the 2021 season, with the management team forming a new entry for 2022. It was subsequently announced that the team would rebrand as RNF MotoGP Racing starting in 2022. The team continued to use Yamaha bikes for 2022, with options to extend for 2023 and 2024. The team officially entered the class under the name WithU Yamaha RNF MotoGP Team.

=== Rider changes ===
- 2021 Moto2 champion Remy Gardner and runner-up Raúl Fernández entered the MotoGP class with Tech3 KTM. The riders were previously teammates at Red Bull KTM Ajo in Moto2.
- Enea Bastianini joined Gresini Racing from Esponsorama Racing.
- Fabio Di Giannantonio entered the MotoGP class with Gresini Racing.
- Maverick Viñales was initially signed to ride with Monster Energy Yamaha MotoGP until the end of the 2022 season, but he mutually agreed with the team to leave after 2021. He joined Aprilia Racing mid-season in 2021 after being released prematurely from Yamaha, replacing Lorenzo Savadori.
- Valentino Rossi announced during the 2021 Styrian Grand Prix that he would retire after the 2021 season.
- Franco Morbidelli was in contract to race for Petronas SRT until 2022, but was promoted to the Yamaha factory team during the 2021 season as a championship replacement for Maverick Viñales.
- Andrea Dovizioso was brought into the SRT team to replace Morbidelli during the 2021 season, and signed a contract with Yamaha to race in 2022 for WithU Yamaha RNF MotoGP which replaced SRT.
- Marco Bezzecchi entered the MotoGP class with the VR46 Racing Team.
- Darryn Binder, younger brother of Brad Binder, entered the MotoGP class with WithU Yamaha RNF MotoGP.
- Iker Lecuona, who raced for Tech3 in 2021, left the series and moved to the Superbike World Championship.
- Danilo Petrucci, who also raced for Tech3 in 2021, left the series and participated in the 2022 Dakar Rally with KTM.

==== Mid-season changes ====
- Marc Márquez missed the Argentine round after being diagnosed with effects of diplopia sustained in a warm-up crash during the previous Indonesian round. He was also sidelined indefinitely beginning with the Catalan round, after having a fourth surgery on his right humerus. He was replaced for all races by Honda test rider Stefan Bradl. Márquez returned at the Aragon Grand Prix after missing six rounds.
- Joan Mir missed the San Marino round after suffering an ankle injury due to a crash in the main race of the previous Austrian round. He was replaced by Kazuki Watanabe. Mir returned during the Aragon Grand Prix, but did not start the race due to the effects of the same ankle injury. He also missed the subsequent Japanese round and was replaced by Takuya Tsuda, who was initially planned to enter the Grand Prix as a wildcard. Mir also missed the Thai round and was replaced by the returning Danilo Petrucci.
- Andrea Dovizioso retired after the San Marino round. He was replaced by Cal Crutchlow for the remaining six rounds of the season.
- Takaaki Nakagami missed the Thai, Australian, and Malaysian rounds to undergo surgery on his injured finger that he sustained during the Aragon round. He was replaced for all races by Tetsuta Nagashima.

== Calendar ==
The following Grands Prix took place in 2022:

| Round | Date | Grand Prix | Circuit |
|---|---|---|---|
| 1 | 6 March (Note: Night race) | Grand Prix of Qatar | Lusail International Circuit, Lusail |
| 2 | 20 March | Pertamina Grand Prix of Indonesia | Mandalika International Street Circuit, Mandalika |
| 3 | 3 April | Gran Premio Michelin de la República Argentina | Autódromo Termas de Río Hondo, Termas de Río Hondo |
| 4 | 10 April | (United States) Red Bull Grand Prix of The Americas | Circuit of the Americas, Austin |
| 5 | 24 April | Grande Prémio Tissot de Portugal | Algarve International Circuit, Portimão |
| 6 | 1 May | (Spain) Gran Premio Red Bull de España | Circuito de Jerez, Jerez de la Frontera |
| 7 | 15 May | Shark Grand Prix de France | Bugatti Circuit, Le Mans |
| 8 | 29 May | (Italy) Gran Premio d'Italia Oakley | Mugello Circuit, Scarperia e San Piero |
| 9 | 5 June | (Catalonia) Gran Premi Monster Energy de Catalunya | Circuit de Barcelona-Catalunya, Montmeló |
| 10 | 19 June | (Germany) Liqui Moly Motorrad Grand Prix Deutschland | Sachsenring, Hohenstein-Ernstthal |
| 11 | 26 June | (Netherlands) Motul TT Assen | TT Circuit Assen, Assen |
| 12 | 7 August | (United Kingdom) Monster Energy British Grand Prix | Silverstone Circuit, Silverstone |
| 13 | 21 August | (Austria) CryptoData Motorrad Grand Prix von Österreich | Red Bull Ring, Spielberg |
| 14 | 4 September | Gran Premio Gryfyn di San Marino e della Riviera di Rimini | Misano World Circuit, Misano Adriatico |
| 15 | 18 September | (Aragon) Gran Premio Animoca Brands de Aragón | MotorLand Aragón, Alcañiz |
| 16 | 25 September | Motul Grand Prix of Japan | Motegi Circuit, Motegi |
| 17 | 2 October | OR Thailand Grand Prix | Buriram International Circuit, Buriram |
| 18 | 16 October | (Australia) Animoca Brands Australian Motorcycle Grand Prix | Phillip Island Grand Prix Circuit, Phillip Island |
| 19 | 23 October | Petronas Grand Prix of Malaysia | Sepang International Circuit, Sepang |
| 20 | 6 November | (Valencian Community) Gran Premio Motul de la Comunitat Valenciana | Circuit Ricardo Tormo, Valencia |
Cancelled Grand Prix
| – | ~~10 July~~ | (Finland) Finnish motorcycle Grand Prix | Kymi Ring, Iitti |

=== Grand Prix locations ===
Location of non-European Grands Prix in 2022.
Location of European Grands Prix in 2022.
(scheduled Grand Prix: cancelled Grand Prix)

=== Calendar changes ===
Comparison between the configuration of the Red Bull Ring used from 2016 to 2021 (top), and the layout used starting 2022 (bottom).
- Cancelled Grands Prix in 2021 as a response to the COVID-19 pandemic, namely the Argentine, Finnish, Japanese, Thailand, Australian, and Malaysian Grands Prix, returned in 2022. Consequently, the Grands Prix held in 2021 that replaced the aforementioned cancelled races, namely the Doha, Styrian, Emilia Romagna, and Algarve Grands Prix, did not return in 2022.
- The previously mentioned Finnish Grand Prix was planned to return to the calendar after a 39-year absence. The venue hosting the round would have been the new Kymi Ring, instead of the Pyynikki Circuit used in 1962 and 1963 or the Imatra Circuit which hosted the round until 1982. The Grand Prix was included on both the 2020 and 2021 calendars, but both races were cancelled in response to the COVID-19 pandemic. However, the race scheduled for July was cancelled in May due to incomplete homologation works and the risks associated with the geopolitical situation in the region surrounding the Russian invasion of Ukraine.
- The Indonesian Grand Prix returned to the calendar after a 24-year absence. The venue hosting the round was the new Mandalika International Street Circuit, instead of the Sentul International Circuit used in 1996 and 1997. The Grand Prix had been included in the 2021 calendar as a Reserve Grand Prix but was ultimately dropped before the end of the season.
- The Brazilian Grand Prix, which had previously been announced to return in 2022, was not included in the provisional calendar released on 7 October 2021.
- The Austrian Grand Prix used a new layout of the Red Bull Ring, wherein a chicane was added to the previous fast slight-left hander of turn 2. This was done to improve the overall safety of the track by greatly reducing the speed the riders take the turn. The final configuration was chosen among 15 proposals, with the track being 30 meters longer than the previous configurations.

== Results and standings ==
=== Grands Prix ===
| Round | Grand Prix | Pole position | Fastest lap | Winning rider | Winning team | Winning constructor | Report |
|---|---|---|---|---|---|---|---|
| 1 | Qatar motorcycle Grand Prix | (Spain) Jorge Martín | (Italy) Enea Bastianini | (Italy) Enea Bastianini | (Italy) Gresini Racing MotoGP | (Italy) Ducati | Report |
| 2 | (Indonesia) Indonesian motorcycle Grand Prix | (France) Fabio Quartararo | (France) Fabio Quartararo | (Portugal) Miguel Oliveira | (Austria) Red Bull KTM Factory Racing | (Austria) KTM | Report |
| 3 | (Argentina) Argentine Republic motorcycle Grand Prix | (Spain) Aleix Espargaró | (Spain) Aleix Espargaró | (Spain) Aleix Espargaró | (Italy) Aprilia Racing | (Italy) Aprilia | Report |
| 4 | (United States) Motorcycle Grand Prix of the Americas | (Spain) Jorge Martín | (Italy) Enea Bastianini | (Italy) Enea Bastianini | (Italy) Gresini Racing MotoGP | (Italy) Ducati | Report |
| 5 | (Portugal) Portuguese motorcycle Grand Prix | (France) Johann Zarco | (France) Fabio Quartararo | (France) Fabio Quartararo | (Japan) Monster Energy Yamaha MotoGP | (Japan) Yamaha | Report |
| 6 | (Spain) Spanish motorcycle Grand Prix | (Italy) Francesco Bagnaia | (Italy) Francesco Bagnaia | (Italy) Francesco Bagnaia | (Italy) Ducati Lenovo Team | (Italy) Ducati | Report |
| 7 | (France) French motorcycle Grand Prix | (Italy) Francesco Bagnaia | (Italy) Francesco Bagnaia | (Italy) Enea Bastianini | (Italy) Gresini Racing MotoGP | (Italy) Ducati | Report |
| 8 | (Italy) Italian motorcycle Grand Prix | (Italy) Fabio Di Giannantonio | (Italy) Francesco Bagnaia | (Italy) Francesco Bagnaia | (Italy) Ducati Lenovo Team | (Italy) Ducati | Report |
| 9 | (Catalonia) Catalan motorcycle Grand Prix | (Spain) Aleix Espargaró | (France) Fabio Quartararo | (France) Fabio Quartararo | (Japan) Monster Energy Yamaha MotoGP | (Japan) Yamaha | Report |
| 10 | (Germany) German motorcycle Grand Prix | (Italy) Francesco Bagnaia | (France) Fabio Quartararo | (France) Fabio Quartararo | (Japan) Monster Energy Yamaha MotoGP | (Japan) Yamaha | Report |
| 11 | (Netherlands) Dutch TT | (Italy) Francesco Bagnaia | (Spain) Aleix Espargaró | (Italy) Francesco Bagnaia | (Italy) Ducati Lenovo Team | (Italy) Ducati | Report |
| 12 | (United Kingdom) British motorcycle Grand Prix | (France) Johann Zarco | (Spain) Álex Rins | (Italy) Francesco Bagnaia | (Italy) Ducati Lenovo Team | (Italy) Ducati | Report |
| 13 | (Austria) Austrian motorcycle Grand Prix | (Italy) Enea Bastianini | (Spain) Jorge Martín | (Italy) Francesco Bagnaia | (Italy) Ducati Lenovo Team | (Italy) Ducati | Report |
| 14 | San Marino and Rimini Riviera motorcycle Grand Prix | (Australia) Jack Miller | (Italy) Enea Bastianini | (Italy) Francesco Bagnaia | (Italy) Ducati Lenovo Team | (Italy) Ducati | Report |
| 15 | Aragon motorcycle Grand Prix | (Italy) Francesco Bagnaia | (Italy) Luca Marini | (Italy) Enea Bastianini | (Italy) Gresini Racing MotoGP | (Italy) Ducati | Report |
| 16 | (Japan) Japanese motorcycle Grand Prix | (Spain) Marc Márquez | (Australia) Jack Miller | (Australia) Jack Miller | (Italy) Ducati Lenovo Team | (Italy) Ducati | Report |
| 17 | Thailand motorcycle Grand Prix | (Italy) Marco Bezzecchi | (France) Johann Zarco | (Portugal) Miguel Oliveira | (Austria) Red Bull KTM Factory Racing | (Austria) KTM | Report |
| 18 | (Australia) Australian motorcycle Grand Prix | (Spain) Jorge Martín | (France) Johann Zarco | (Spain) Álex Rins | (Japan) Team Suzuki Ecstar | (Japan) Suzuki | Report |
| 19 | (Malaysia) Malaysian motorcycle Grand Prix | (Spain) Jorge Martín | (Spain) Jorge Martín | (Italy) Francesco Bagnaia | (Italy) Ducati Lenovo Team | (Italy) Ducati | Report |
| 20 | Valencian Community motorcycle Grand Prix | (Spain) Jorge Martín | (South Africa) Brad Binder | (Spain) Álex Rins | (Japan) Team Suzuki Ecstar | (Japan) Suzuki | Report |

=== Riders' standings ===
Scoring system

Points were awarded to the top fifteen finishers. A rider had to finish the race to earn points.

| Position | 1st | 2nd | 3rd | 4th | 5th | 6th | 7th | 8th | 9th | 10th | 11th | 12th | 13th | 14th | 15th |
| Points | 25 | 20 | 16 | 13 | 11 | 10 | 9 | 8 | 7 | 6 | 5 | 4 | 3 | 2 | 1 |

| Pos. | Rider | Bike | Team | QAT (Qatar) | INA (Indonesia) | ARG (Argentina) | AME (United States) | POR (Portugal) | SPA (Spain) | FRA (France) | ITA (Italy) | CAT (Catalonia) | GER (Germany) | NED (Netherlands) | GBR (United Kingdom) | AUT (Austria) | RSM (San Marino) | ARA (Aragon) | JPN (Japan) | THA (Thailand) | AUS (Australia) | MAL (Malaysia) | VAL (Valencian Community) | Pts |
|---|---|---|---|---|---|---|---|---|---|---|---|---|---|---|---|---|---|---|---|---|---|---|---|---|
| 1 | (Italy) Francesco Bagnaia | Ducati | Ducati Lenovo Team | Ret | 15 | 5 | 5 | 8 | 1^{P F} | Ret^{P F} | 1^{F} | Ret | Ret^{P} | 1^{P} | 1 | 1 | 1 | 2^{P} | Ret | 3 | 3 | 1 | 9 | 265 |
| 2 | (France) Fabio Quartararo | Yamaha | Monster Energy Yamaha MotoGP | 9 | 2^{P F} | 8 | 7 | 1^{F} | 2 | 4 | 2 | 1^{F} | 1^{F} | Ret | 8 | 2 | 5 | Ret | 8 | 17 | Ret | 3 | 4 | 248 |
| 3 | (Italy) Enea Bastianini | Ducati | Gresini Racing MotoGP | 1^{F} | 11 | 10 | 1^{F} | Ret | 8 | 1 | Ret | Ret | 10 | 11 | 4 | Ret^{P} | 2^{F} | 1 | 9 | 6 | 5 | 2 | 8 | 219 |
| 4 | (Spain) Aleix Espargaró | Aprilia | Aprilia Racing | 4 | 9 | 1^{P F} | 11 | 3 | 3 | 3 | 3 | 5^{P} | 4 | 4^{F} | 9 | 6 | 6 | 3 | 16 | 11 | 9 | 10 | Ret | 212 |
| 5 | (Australia) Jack Miller | Ducati | Ducati Lenovo Team | Ret | 4 | 14 | 3 | Ret | 5 | 2 | 15 | 14 | 3 | 6 | 3 | 3 | 18^{P} | 5 | 1^{F} | 2 | Ret | 6 | Ret | 189 |
| 6 | (South Africa) Brad Binder | KTM | Red Bull KTM Factory Racing | 2 | 8 | 6 | 12 | Ret | 10 | 8 | 7 | 8 | 7 | 5 | 11 | 7 | 8 | 4 | 2 | 10 | 10 | 8 | 2^{F} | 188 |
| 7 | (Spain) Álex Rins | Suzuki | Team Suzuki Ecstar | 7 | 5 | 3 | 2 | 4 | 19 | Ret | Ret | Ret | DNS | 10 | 7^{F} | 8 | 7 | 9 | Ret | 12 | 1 | 5 | 1 | 173 |
| 8 | (France) Johann Zarco | Ducati | Pramac Racing | 8 | 3 | Ret | 9 | 2^{P} | Ret | 5 | 4 | 3 | 2 | 13 | Ret^{P} | 5 | Ret | 8 | 11 | 4^{F} | 8^{F} | 9 | Ret | 166 |
| 9 | (Spain) Jorge Martín | Ducati | Pramac Racing | Ret^{P} | Ret | 2 | 8^{P} | Ret | 22 | Ret | 13 | 2 | 6 | 7 | 5 | 10^{F} | 9 | 6 | 3 | 9 | 7^{P} | Ret^{P F} | 3^{P} | 152 |
| 10 | (Portugal) Miguel Oliveira | KTM | Red Bull KTM Factory Racing | Ret | 1 | 13 | 18 | 5 | 12 | Ret | 9 | 9 | 9 | 9 | 6 | 12 | 11 | 11 | 5 | 1 | 12 | 13 | 5 | 149 |
| 11 | (Spain) Maverick Viñales | Aprilia | Aprilia Racing | 12 | 16 | 7 | 10 | 10 | 14 | 10 | 12 | 7 | Ret | 3 | 2 | 13 | 3 | 13 | 7 | 7 | 17 | 16 | Ret | 122 |
| 12 | (Italy) Luca Marini | Ducati | Mooney VR46 Racing Team | 13 | 14 | 11 | 17 | 12 | 16 | 9 | 6 | 6 | 5 | 17 | 12 | 4 | 4 | 7^{F} | 6 | 23 | 6 | Ret | 7 | 120 |
| 13 | (Spain) Marc Márquez | Honda | Repsol Honda Team | 5 | DNS | | 6 | 6 | 4 | 6 | 10 | | | | | | | Ret | 4^{P} | 5 | 2 | 7 | Ret | 113 |
| 14 | (Italy) Marco Bezzecchi | Ducati | Mooney VR46 Racing Team | Ret | 20 | 9 | Ret | 15 | 9 | 12 | 5 | Ret | 11 | 2 | 10 | 9 | 17 | 10 | 10 | 16^{P} | 4 | 4 | 11 | 111 |
| 15 | (Spain) Joan Mir | Suzuki | Team Suzuki Ecstar | 6 | 6 | 4 | 4 | Ret | 6 | Ret | Ret | 4 | Ret | 8 | Ret | Ret | | DNS | | | 18 | 19 | 6 | 87 |
| 16 | (Spain) Pol Espargaró | Honda | Repsol Honda Team | 3 | 12 | Ret | 13 | 9 | 11 | 11 | Ret | 17 | Ret | DNS | 14 | 16 | Ret | 15 | 12 | 14 | 11 | 14 | Ret | 56 |
| 17 | (Spain) Álex Márquez | Honda | LCR Honda Castrol | Ret | 13 | 15 | Ret | 7 | 13 | 14 | 14 | 10 | Ret | 15 | 17 | 14 | 10 | 12 | 13 | 8 | Ret | 17 | 17 | 50 |
| 18 | (Japan) Takaaki Nakagami | Honda | LCR Honda Idemitsu | 10 | 19 | 12 | 14 | 16 | 7 | 7 | 8 | Ret | Ret | 12 | 13 | Ret | 15 | Ret | 20 | | | | 14 | 48 |
| 19 | (Italy) Franco Morbidelli | Yamaha | Monster Energy Yamaha MotoGP | 11 | 7 | Ret | 16 | 13 | 15 | 15 | 17 | 13 | 13 | Ret | 15 | Ret | Ret | 17 | 14 | 13 | Ret | 11 | 10 | 42 |
| 20 | (Italy) Fabio Di Giannantonio | Ducati | Gresini Racing MotoGP | 17 | 18 | Ret | 21 | Ret | 18 | 13 | 11^{P} | Ret | 8 | 14 | 22 | 11 | 20 | 19 | 17 | 18 | 20 | Ret | 15 | 24 |
| 21 | (Italy) Andrea Dovizioso | Yamaha | WithU Yamaha RNF MotoGP Team | 14 | Ret | 20 | 15 | 11 | 17 | 16 | 20 | Ret | 14 | 16 | 16 | 15 | 12 | | | | | | | 15 |
| 22 | (Spain) Raúl Fernández | KTM | Tech3 KTM Factory Racing | 18 | 17 | 16 | 19 | DNS | WD | Ret | 21 | 15 | 12 | Ret | 21 | 18 | 13 | 20 | 18 | 15 | 16 | 15 | 12 | 14 |
| 23 | (Australia) Remy Gardner | KTM | Tech3 KTM Factory Racing | 15 | 21 | 17 | 20 | 14 | 20 | Ret | 19 | 11 | 15 | 19 | 18 | 20 | 19 | 16 | 19 | Ret | 15 | 18 | 13 | 13 |
| 24 | (South Africa) Darryn Binder | Yamaha | WithU Yamaha RNF MotoGP Team | 16 | 10 | 18 | 22 | 17 | Ret | 17 | 16 | 12 | Ret | Ret | 20 | Ret | 16 | 18 | Ret | 21 | 14 | Ret | Ret | 12 |
| 25 | (United Kingdom) Cal Crutchlow | Yamaha | WithU Yamaha RNF MotoGP Team | | | | | | | | | | | | | | | 14 | 15 | 19 | 13 | 12 | 16 | 10 |
| 26 | (Germany) Stefan Bradl | Honda | Repsol Honda Team | | | 19 | | | | | | Ret | 16 | 18 | 19 | 17 | 14 | | | | | | | 2 |
| 26 | (Germany) Stefan Bradl | Honda | Team HRC | | | | | | Ret | | | | | | | | | | | | | | | 2 |
| 27 | (Italy) Michele Pirro | Ducati | Aruba.it Racing | | | | | | | | 18 | 16 | | | | | Ret | | | | | | | 0 |
| 28 | (Italy) Lorenzo Savadori | Aprilia | Aprilia Racing | | | | | Ret | 21 | | 22 | | | 20 | | 19 | | | | | | | | 0 |
| 29 | (Japan) Tetsuta Nagashima | Honda | HRC Team | | | | | | | | | | | | | | | | Ret | | | | | 0 |
| 29 | (Japan) Tetsuta Nagashima | Honda | LCR Honda Idemitsu | | | | | | | | | | | | | | | | | 22 | 19 | Ret | | 0 |
| 30 | (Italy) Danilo Petrucci | Suzuki | Team Suzuki Ecstar | | | | | | | | | | | | | | | | | 20 | | | | 0 |
| 31 | (Japan) Kazuki Watanabe | Suzuki | Team Suzuki Ecstar | | | | | | | | | | | | | | 21 | | | | | | | 0 |
| | (Japan) Takuya Tsuda | Suzuki | Team Suzuki Ecstar | | | | | | | | | | | | | | | | Ret | | | | | 0 |
| Pos. | Rider | Bike | Team | QAT (Qatar) | INA (Indonesia) | ARG (Argentina) | AME (United States) | POR (Portugal) | SPA (Spain) | FRA (France) | ITA (Italy) | CAT (Catalonia) | GER (Germany) | NED (Netherlands) | GBR (United Kingdom) | AUT (Austria) | RSM (San Marino) | ARA (Aragon) | JPN (Japan) | THA (Thailand) | AUS (Australia) | MAL (Malaysia) | VAL (Valencian Community) | Pts |

Race key
| Colour | Result |
|---|---|
| Gold | Winner |
| Silver | 2nd place |
| Bronze | 3rd place |
| Green | Points finish |
| Blue | Non-points finish |
| Blue | Non-classified finish (NC) |
| Purple | Retired (Ret) |
| Red | Did not qualify (DNQ) |
| Black | Disqualified (DSQ) |
| White | Did not start (DNS) |
| White | Withdrew (WD) |
| White | Race cancelled (C) |
| Blank | Did not practice (DNP) |
| Blank | Excluded (EX) |
| Blank | Did not arrive (DNA) |
| Blank | Did not enter (empty cell) |
| Annotation | Meaning |
| P | Pole position |
| F | Fastest lap |
Rider key
| Colour | Meaning |
| Light blue | Rookie rider |

=== Constructors' standings ===
Each constructor received the same number of points as their best placed rider in each race.

| Pos. | Constructor | QAT (Qatar) | INA (Indonesia) | ARG (Argentina) | AME (United States) | POR (Portugal) | SPA (Spain) | FRA (France) | ITA (Italy) | CAT (Catalonia) | GER (Germany) | NED (Netherlands) | GBR (United Kingdom) | AUT (Austria) | RSM (San Marino) | ARA (Aragon) | JPN (Japan) | THA (Thailand) | AUS (Australia) | MAL (Malaysia) | VAL (Valencian Community) | Pts |
|---|---|---|---|---|---|---|---|---|---|---|---|---|---|---|---|---|---|---|---|---|---|---|
| 1 | (Italy) Ducati | 1 | 3 | 2 | 1 | 2 | 1 | 1 | 1 | 2 | 2 | 1 | 1 | 1 | 1 | 1 | 1 | 2 | 3 | 1 | 3 | 448 |
| 2 | (Japan) Yamaha | 9 | 2 | 8 | 7 | 1 | 2 | 4 | 2 | 1 | 1 | 16 | 8 | 2 | 5 | 14 | 8 | 13 | 13 | 3 | 4 | 256 |
| 3 | (Italy) Aprilia | 4 | 9 | 1 | 10 | 3 | 3 | 3 | 3 | 5 | 4 | 3 | 2 | 6 | 3 | 3 | 7 | 7 | 9 | 10 | Ret | 248 |
| 4 | (Austria) KTM | 2 | 1 | 6 | 12 | 5 | 10 | 8 | 7 | 8 | 7 | 5 | 6 | 7 | 8 | 4 | 2 | 1 | 10 | 8 | 2 | 240 |
| 5 | (Japan) Suzuki | 6 | 5 | 3 | 2 | 4 | 6 | Ret | Ret | 4 | Ret | 8 | 7 | 8 | 7 | 9 | Ret | 12 | 1 | 5 | 1 | 199 |
| 6 | (Japan) Honda | 3 | 12 | 12 | 6 | 6 | 4 | 6 | 8 | 10 | 16 | 12 | 13 | 14 | 10 | 12 | 4 | 5 | 2 | 7 | 14 | 155 |
| Pos. | Constructor | QAT (Qatar) | INA (Indonesia) | ARG (Argentina) | AME (United States) | POR (Portugal) | SPA (Spain) | FRA (France) | ITA (Italy) | CAT (Catalonia) | GER (Germany) | NED (Netherlands) | GBR (United Kingdom) | AUT (Austria) | RSM (San Marino) | ARA (Aragon) | JPN (Japan) | THA (Thailand) | AUS (Australia) | MAL (Malaysia) | VAL (Valencian Community) | Pts |

=== Teams' standings ===
The teams' standings were based on results obtained by regular and substitute riders; wild-card entries were ineligible.

| Pos. | Team | Bike No. | QAT (Qatar) | INA (Indonesia) | ARG (Argentina) | AME (United States) | POR (Portugal) | SPA (Spain) | FRA (France) | ITA (Italy) | CAT (Catalonia) | GER (Germany) | NED (Netherlands) | GBR (United Kingdom) | AUT (Austria) | RSM (San Marino) | ARA (Aragon) | JPN (Japan) | THA (Thailand) | AUS (Australia) | MAL (Malaysia) | VAL (Valencian Community) | Pts |
|---|---|---|---|---|---|---|---|---|---|---|---|---|---|---|---|---|---|---|---|---|---|---|---|
| 1 | (Italy) Ducati Lenovo Team | 43 | Ret | 4 | 14 | 3 | Ret | 5 | 2 | 15 | 14 | 3 | 6 | 3 | 3 | 18^{P} | 5 | 1^{F} | 2 | Ret | 6 | Ret | 454 |
| 1 | (Italy) Ducati Lenovo Team | 63 | Ret | 15 | 5 | 5 | 8 | 1^{P F} | Ret^{P F} | 1^{F} | Ret | Ret^{P} | 1^{P} | 1 | 1 | 1 | 2^{P} | Ret | 3 | 3 | 1 | 9 | 454 |
| 2 | (Austria) Red Bull KTM Factory Racing | 33 | 2 | 8 | 6 | 12 | Ret | 10 | 8 | 7 | 8 | 7 | 5 | 11 | 7 | 8 | 4 | 2 | 10 | 10 | 8 | 2^{F} | 337 |
| 2 | (Austria) Red Bull KTM Factory Racing | 88 | Ret | 1 | 13 | 18 | 5 | 12 | Ret | 9 | 9 | 9 | 9 | 6 | 12 | 11 | 11 | 5 | 1 | 12 | 13 | 5 | 337 |
| 3 | (Italy) Aprilia Racing | 12 | 12 | 16 | 7 | 10 | 10 | 14 | 10 | 12 | 7 | Ret | 3 | 2 | 13 | 3 | 13 | 7 | 7 | 17 | 16 | Ret | 334 |
| 3 | (Italy) Aprilia Racing | 41 | 4 | 9 | 1^{P F} | 11 | 3 | 3 | 3 | 3 | 5^{P} | 4 | 4^{F} | 9 | 6 | 6 | 3 | 16 | 11 | 9 | 10 | Ret | 334 |
| 4 | (Italy) Pramac Racing | 5 | 8 | 3 | Ret | 9 | 2^{P} | Ret | 5 | 4 | 3 | 2 | 13 | Ret^{P} | 5 | Ret | 8 | 11 | 4^{F} | 8^{F} | 9 | Ret | 318 |
| 4 | (Italy) Pramac Racing | 89 | Ret^{P} | Ret | 2 | 8^{P} | Ret | 22 | Ret | 13 | 2 | 6 | 7 | 5 | 10^{F} | 9 | 6 | 3 | 9 | 7^{P} | Ret^{P F} | 3^{P} | 318 |
| 5 | (Japan) Monster Energy Yamaha MotoGP | 20 | 9 | 2^{P F} | 8 | 7 | 1^{F} | 2 | 4 | 2 | 1^{F} | 1^{F} | Ret | 8 | 2 | 5 | Ret | 8 | 17 | Ret | 3 | 4 | 290 |
| 5 | (Japan) Monster Energy Yamaha MotoGP | 21 | 11 | 7 | Ret | 16 | 13 | 15 | 15 | 17 | 13 | 13 | Ret | 15 | Ret | Ret | 17 | 14 | 13 | Ret | 11 | 10 | 290 |
| 6 | (Japan) Team Suzuki Ecstar | | | | | | | | | | | | | | | | | | | | | | |
| 6 | (Japan) Team Suzuki Ecstar | 9 | | | | | | | | | | | | | | | | | 20 | | | | 260 |
| 6 | (Japan) Team Suzuki Ecstar | 36 | 6 | 6 | 4 | 4 | Ret | 6 | Ret | Ret | 4 | Ret | 8 | Ret | Ret | | DNS | | | 18 | 19 | 6 | 260 |
| 6 | (Japan) Team Suzuki Ecstar | 42 | 7 | 5 | 3 | 2 | 4 | 19 | Ret | Ret | Ret | DNS | 10 | 7^{F} | 8 | 7 | 9 | Ret | 12 | 1 | 5 | 1 | 260 |
| 6 | (Japan) Team Suzuki Ecstar | 85 | | | | | | | | | | | | | | | | Ret | | | | | 260 |
| 6 | (Japan) Team Suzuki Ecstar | 92 | | | | | | | | | | | | | | 21 | | | | | | | 260 |
| 7 | (Italy) Gresini Racing MotoGP | 23 | 1^{F} | 11 | 10 | 1^{F} | Ret | 8 | 1 | Ret | Ret | 10 | 11 | 4 | Ret^{P} | 2^{F} | 1 | 9 | 6 | 5 | 2 | 8 | 243 |
| 7 | (Italy) Gresini Racing MotoGP | 49 | 17 | 18 | Ret | 21 | Ret | 18 | 13 | 11^{P} | Ret | 8 | 14 | 22 | 11 | 20 | 19 | 17 | 18 | 20 | Ret | 15 | 243 |
| 8 | (Italy) Mooney VR46 Racing Team | 10 | 13 | 14 | 11 | 17 | 12 | 16 | 9 | 6 | 6 | 5 | 17 | 12 | 4 | 4 | 7^{F} | 6 | 23 | 6 | Ret | 7 | 231 |
| 8 | (Italy) Mooney VR46 Racing Team | 72 | Ret | 20 | 9 | Ret | 15 | 9 | 12 | 5 | Ret | 11 | 2 | 10 | 9 | 17 | 10 | 10 | 16^{P} | 4 | 4 | 11 | 231 |
| 9 | (Japan) Repsol Honda Team | 6 | | | 19 | | | | | | Ret | 16 | 18 | 19 | 17 | 14 | | | | | | | 171 |
| 9 | (Japan) Repsol Honda Team | 44 | 3 | 12 | Ret | 13 | 9 | 11 | 11 | Ret | 17 | Ret | DNS | 14 | 16 | Ret | 15 | 12 | 14 | 11 | 14 | Ret | 171 |
| 9 | (Japan) Repsol Honda Team | 93 | 5 | DNS | | 6 | 6 | 4 | 6 | 10 | | | | | | | Ret | 4^{P} | 5 | 2 | 7 | Ret | 171 |
| 10 | (Monaco) LCR Honda | 30 | 10 | 19 | 12 | 14 | 16 | 7 | 7 | 8 | Ret | Ret | 12 | 13 | Ret | 15 | Ret | 20 | | | | 14 | 98 |
| 10 | (Monaco) LCR Honda | 45 | | | | | | | | | | | | | | | | | 22 | 19 | Ret | | 98 |
| 10 | (Monaco) LCR Honda | 73 | Ret | 13 | 15 | Ret | 7 | 13 | 14 | 14 | 10 | Ret | 15 | 17 | 14 | 10 | 12 | 13 | 8 | Ret | 17 | 17 | 98 |
| 11 | (Malaysia) WithU Yamaha RNF MotoGP Team | 04 | 14 | Ret | 20 | 15 | 11 | 17 | 16 | 20 | Ret | 14 | 16 | 16 | 15 | 12 | | | | | | | 37 |
| 11 | (Malaysia) WithU Yamaha RNF MotoGP Team | 35 | | | | | | | | | | | | | | | 14 | 15 | 19 | 13 | 12 | 16 | 37 |
| 11 | (Malaysia) WithU Yamaha RNF MotoGP Team | 40 | 16 | 10 | 18 | 22 | 17 | Ret | 17 | 16 | 12 | Ret | Ret | 20 | Ret | 16 | 18 | Ret | 21 | 14 | Ret | Ret | 37 |
| 12 | (France) Tech3 KTM Factory Racing | 25 | 18 | 17 | 16 | 19 | DNS | WD | Ret | 21 | 15 | 12 | Ret | 21 | 18 | 13 | 20 | 18 | 15 | 16 | 15 | 12 | 27 |
| 12 | (France) Tech3 KTM Factory Racing | 87 | 15 | 21 | 17 | 20 | 14 | 20 | Ret | 19 | 11 | 15 | 19 | 18 | 20 | 19 | 16 | 19 | Ret | 15 | 18 | 13 | 27 |
| Pos. | Team | Bike No. | QAT (Qatar) | INA (Indonesia) | ARG (Argentina) | AME (United States) | POR (Portugal) | SPA (Spain) | FRA (France) | ITA (Italy) | CAT (Catalonia) | GER (Germany) | NED (Netherlands) | GBR (United Kingdom) | AUT (Austria) | RSM (San Marino) | ARA (Aragon) | JPN (Japan) | THA (Thailand) | AUS (Australia) | MAL (Malaysia) | VAL (Valencian Community) | Pts |
