= 2022 Catalan motorcycle Grand Prix =

Ninth round of the 2022 Grand Prix motorcycle racing season

(Catalonia) 2022 Catalan Grand Prix
Race details
- Race 9 of 20 races in the 2022 Grand Prix motorcycle racing season
- Date: 5 June 2022
- Official name: Gran Premi Monster Energy de Catalunya
- Location: Circuit de Barcelona-Catalunya; Montmeló, Spain
- Course: Permanent racing facility; 4.657 km (2.894 mi)

MotoGP
Pole position
Rider	(Spain) Aleix Espargaró	Aprilia
Time	1:38.742	
Fastest lap
Rider	(France) Fabio Quartararo	Yamaha
Time	1:40.186 on lap 3	
Podium
First	(France) Fabio Quartararo	Yamaha
Second	(Spain) Jorge Martín	Ducati
Third	(France) Johann Zarco	Ducati

Moto2
Pole position
Rider	(Italy) Celestino Vietti	Kalex
Time	1:43.823	
Fastest lap
Rider	(Spain) Arón Canet	Kalex
Time	1:44.550 on lap 2	
Podium
First	(Italy) Celestino Vietti	Kalex
Second	(Spain) Arón Canet	Kalex
Third	(Spain) Augusto Fernández	Kalex

Moto3
Pole position
Rider	(Italy) Dennis Foggia	Honda
Time	1:48.290	
Fastest lap
Rider	(Spain) Jaume Masià	KTM
Time	1:48.380 on lap 2	
Podium
First	(Spain) Izan Guevara	Gas Gas
Second	(Spain) David Muñoz	KTM
Third	(Japan) Tatsuki Suzuki	Honda

The 2022 Catalan motorcycle Grand Prix (officially known as the Gran Premi Monster Energy de Catalunya) was the ninth round of the 2022 Grand Prix motorcycle racing season. It was held at the Circuit de Barcelona-Catalunya in Montmeló on 5 June 2022.

== Qualifying ==
=== MotoGP ===
OFFICIAL MOTOGP QUALIFYING RESULTS

Marc Márquez was sidelined due to arm surgery and missed several races. He was replaced by Stefan Bradl.

== Race ==
=== MotoGP ===
Pos.	No.	Biker	Team	Constructor	Laps	Time/Retired	Grid	Points
1	20	(France) Fabio Quartararo	Monster Energy Yamaha MotoGP	Yamaha	24	40:29.360	3	25
2	89	(Spain) Jorge Martín	Prima Pramac Racing	Ducati	24	+6.473	6	20
3	5	(France) Johann Zarco	Prima Pramac Racing	Ducati	24	+8.385	4	16
4	36	(Spain) Joan Mir	Team Suzuki Ecstar	Suzuki	24	+11.481	17	13
5	41	(Spain) Aleix Espargaró	Aprilia Racing	Aprilia	24	+14.395	1	11
6	10	(Italy) Luca Marini	Mooney VR46 Racing Team	Ducati	24	+15.430	9	10
7	12	(Spain) Maverick Viñales	Aprilia Racing	Aprilia	24	+15.975	8	9
8	33	(South Africa) Brad Binder	Red Bull KTM Factory Racing	KTM	24	+21.436	15	8
9	88	(Portugal) Miguel Oliveira	Red Bull KTM Factory Racing	KTM	24	+26.800	16	7
10	73	(Spain) Álex Márquez	LCR Honda Castrol	Honda	24	+30.460	25	6
11	87	(Australia) Remy Gardner	Tech3 KTM Factory Racing	KTM	24	+32.443	20	5
12	40	(South Africa) Darryn Binder	WithU Yamaha RNF MotoGP Team	Yamaha	24	+32.881	23	4
13	21	(Italy) Franco Morbidelli	Monster Energy Yamaha MotoGP	Yamaha	24	+33.168	18	3
14	43	(Australia) Jack Miller	Ducati Lenovo Team	Ducati	24	+34.693	11	2
15	25	(Spain) Raúl Fernández	Tech3 KTM Factory Racing	KTM	24	+37.844	24	1
16	51	(Italy) Michele Pirro	Aruba.it Racing	Ducati	24	+44.533	22	
17	44	(Spain) Pol Espargaró	Repsol Honda Team	Honda	24	+46.199	10	
Ret	4	(Italy) Andrea Dovizioso	WithU Yamaha RNF MotoGP Team	Yamaha	17	Front Tyre	19	
Ret	49	(Italy) Fabio Di Giannantonio	Gresini Racing MotoGP	Ducati	8	Accident Damage	5	
Ret	23	(Italy) Enea Bastianini	Gresini Racing MotoGP	Ducati	7	Accident	14	
Ret	72	(Italy) Marco Bezzecchi	Mooney VR46 Racing Team	Ducati	5	Accident Damage	13	
Ret	63	(Italy) Francesco Bagnaia	Ducati Lenovo Team	Ducati	1	Accident Damage	2	
Ret	6	(Germany) Stefan Bradl	Repsol Honda Team	Honda	0	Accident	21	
Ret	30	(Japan) Takaaki Nakagami	LCR Honda Idemitsu	Honda	0	Accident	12	
Ret	42	(Spain) Álex Rins	Team Suzuki Ecstar	Suzuki	0	Accident	7	
Fastest lap: (France) Fabio Quartararo (Yamaha) – 1:40.186 (lap 3)
OFFICIAL MOTOGP RACE REPORT

=== Moto2 ===
Pos.	No.	Biker	Constructor	Laps	Time/Retired	Grid	Points
1	13	(Italy) Celestino Vietti	Kalex	22	38:42.958	1	25
2	40	(Spain) Arón Canet	Kalex	22	+0.081	2	20
3	37	(Spain) Augusto Fernández	Kalex	22	+0.522	8	16
4	96	(United Kingdom) Jake Dixon	Kalex	22	+0.646	4	13
5	23	(Germany) Marcel Schrötter	Kalex	22	+1.470	9	11
6	51	(Spain) Pedro Acosta	Kalex	22	+6.298	12	10
7	79	(Japan) Ai Ogura	Kalex	22	+6.320	10	9
8	21	(Spain) Alonso Lopez	Boscoscuro	22	+7.229	11	8
9	18	(Spain) Manuel González	Kalex	22	+10.746	14	7
10	14	(Italy) Tony Arbolino	Kalex	22	+12.056	18	6
11	19	(Italy) Lorenzo Dalla Porta	Kalex	22	+12.614	15	5
12	35	(Thailand) Somkiat Chantra	Kalex	22	+13.206	19	4
13	64	(Netherlands) Bo Bendsneyder	Kalex	22	+18.335	7	3
14	9	(Spain) Jorge Navarro	Kalex	22	+18.495	16	2
15	54	(Spain) Fermín Aldeguer	Boscoscuro	22	+19.894	20	1
16	62	(Italy) Stefano Manzi	Kalex	22	+21.721	22	
17	7	(Belgium) Barry Baltus	Kalex	22	+22.269	17	
18	52	(Spain) Jeremy Alcoba	Kalex	22	+22.513	26	
19	28	(Italy) Niccolò Antonelli	Kalex	22	+36.869	25	
20	84	(Netherlands) Zonta van den Goorbergh	Kalex	22	+37.020	24	
21	4	(United States) Sean Dylan Kelly	Kalex	22	+38.420	29	
22	24	(Italy) Simone Corsi	MV Agusta	22	+45.612	27	
23	74	(Poland) Piotr Biesiekirski	Kalex	22	+47.326	31	
24	42	(Spain) Marcos Ramírez	MV Agusta	22	+54.598	30	
Ret	75	(Spain) Albert Arenas	Kalex	19	Fuel Pump	5	
Ret	22	(United Kingdom) Sam Lowes	Kalex	19	Accident	6	
Ret	61	(Italy) Alessandro Zaccone	Kalex	14	Handling	28	
Ret	16	(United States) Joe Roberts	Kalex	10	Accident	3	
Ret	6	(United States) Cameron Beaubier	Kalex	4	Accident	23	
Ret	12	(Czech Republic) Filip Salač	Kalex	3	Accident	13	
Ret	55	(Spain) Alex Toledo	Kalex	2	Accident	21	
Fastest lap: (Spain) Arón Canet (Kalex) – 1:44.550 (lap 2)
OFFICIAL MOTO2 RACE REPORT

=== Moto3 ===
Pos.	No.	Biker	Constructor	Laps	Time/Retired	Grid	Points
1	28	(Spain) Izan Guevara	Gas Gas	21	38:22.351	3	25
2	44	(Spain) David Muñoz	KTM	21	+1.975	20	20
3	24	(Japan) Tatsuki Suzuki	Honda	21	+1.985	10	16
4	11	(Spain) Sergio García	Gas Gas	21	+2.036	7	13
5	53	(Turkey) Deniz Öncü	KTM	21	+2.752	2	11
6	99	(Spain) Carlos Tatay	CFMoto	21	+3.134	18	10
7	17	(United Kingdom) John McPhee	Husqvarna	21	+3.341	11	9
8	5	(Spain) Jaume Masià	KTM	21	+3.633	14	8
9	31	(Spain) Adrián Fernández	KTM	21	+5.285	24	7
10	43	(Spain) Xavier Artigas	CFMoto	21	+5.555	21	6
11	54	(Italy) Riccardo Rossi	Honda	21	+7.626	6	5
12	66	(Australia) Joel Kelso	KTM	21	+9.215	9	4
13	18	(Italy) Matteo Bertelle	KTM	21	+11.325	12	3
14	19	(United Kingdom) Scott Ogden	Honda	21	+11.379	13	2
15	27	(Japan) Kaito Toba	KTM	21	+24.644	8	1
16	82	(Italy) Stefano Nepa	KTM	21	+25.007	25	
17	23	(Italy) Elia Bartolini	KTM	21	+25.036	23	
18	48	(Spain) Iván Ortolá	KTM	21	+25.165	28	
19	63	(Malaysia) Syarifuddin Azman	Honda	21	+25.210	26	
20	20	(France) Lorenzo Fellon	Honda	21	+25.239	4	
21	6	(Japan) Ryusei Yamanaka	KTM	21	+40.387	5	
22	22	(Spain) Ana Carrasco	KTM	21	+58.048	29	
Ret	89	(Spain) Marcos Uriarte	Honda	15	Accident	27	
Ret	16	(Italy) Andrea Migno	Honda	14	Mechanical	15	
Ret	70	(United Kingdom) Joshua Whatley	Honda	12	Mechanical	30	
Ret	72	(Japan) Taiyo Furusato	Honda	9	Accident	22	
Ret	64	(Indonesia) Mario Aji	Honda	8	Accident	19	
Ret	96	(Spain) Daniel Holgado	KTM	8	Accident	17	
Ret	38	(Spain) David Salvador	Husqvarna	8	Accident	16	
Ret	7	(Italy) Dennis Foggia	Honda	6	Gearbox	1	
DNS	10	(Brazil) Diogo Moreira	KTM		Did not start		
Fastest lap: (Spain) Jaume Masià (KTM) – 1:48.380 (lap 2)
OFFICIAL MOTO3 RACE REPORT

- Diogo Moreira withdrew from the event due to effects of hand injury suffered at the previous round in Mugello.

== Championship standings after the race ==
Below are the standings for the top five riders, constructors, and teams after the round.

=== MotoGP ===
Riders' Championship standings

	Pos.	Rider	Points
	1	(France) Fabio Quartararo	147
	2	(Spain) Aleix Espargaró	125
	3	(Italy) Enea Bastianini	94
1	4	(France) Johann Zarco	91
1	5	(Italy) Francesco Bagnaia	81

Constructors' Championship standings

Pos.	Constructor	Points
1	(Italy) Ducati	201
2	(Japan) Yamaha	147
3	(Italy) Aprilia	126
4	(Austria) KTM	101
5	(Japan) Suzuki	93

Teams' Championship standings

	Pos.	Team	Points
	1	(Italy) Aprilia Racing	171
1	2	(Japan) Monster Energy Yamaha MotoGP	169
1	3	(Italy) Ducati Lenovo Team	146
2	4	(Italy) Prima Pramac Racing	142
1	5	(Japan) Team Suzuki Ecstar	138

=== Moto2 ===
Riders' Championship standings

	Pos.	Rider	Points
	1	(Italy) Celestino Vietti	133
	2	(Japan) Ai Ogura	117
	3	(Spain) Arón Canet	109
2	4	(Spain) Augusto Fernández	96
	5	(Italy) Tony Arbolino	89

Constructors' Championship standings

Pos.	Constructor	Points
1	(Germany) Kalex	225
2	(Italy) Boscoscuro	36
3	(Italy) MV Agusta	5

Teams' Championship standings

	Pos.	Team	Points
	1	(Japan) Idemitsu Honda Team Asia	182
	2	(Spain) Flexbox HP40	167
	3	(Finland) Red Bull KTM Ajo	151
1	4	(Italy) Mooney VR46 Racing Team	133
1	5	(Belgium) Elf Marc VDS Racing Team	124

=== Moto3 ===
Riders' Championship standings

	Pos.	Rider	Points
	1	(Spain) Sergio García	150
	2	(Spain) Izan Guevara	134
	3	(Spain) Jaume Masià	103
	4	(Italy) Dennis Foggia	95
2	5	(Turkey) Deniz Öncü	82

Constructors' Championship standings

Pos.	Constructor	Points
1	(Spain) Gas Gas	190
2	(Austria) KTM	154
3	(Japan) Honda	148
4	(Sweden) Husqvarna	95
5	(China) CFMoto	81

Teams' Championship standings

	Pos.	Team	Points
	1	(Spain) Valresa GasGas Aspar Team	284
	2	(Luxembourg) Leopard Racing	165
	3	(Finland) Red Bull KTM Ajo	131
1	4	(Germany) CFMoto Racing Prüstel GP	105
1	5	(France) Red Bull KTM Tech3	102

Previous race: 2022 Italian Grand Prix	FIM Grand Prix World Championship; 2022 season	Next race: 2022 German Grand Prix
Previous race: 2021 Catalan Grand Prix	Catalan motorcycle Grand Prix	Next race: 2023 Catalan Grand Prix
