= 2022 British motorcycle Grand Prix =

Twelfth round of the 2022 Grand Prix motorcycle racing season

(United Kingdom) 2022 British Grand Prix
Race details
- Race 12 of 20 races in the 2022 Grand Prix motorcycle racing season
- Date: 7 August 2022
- Official name: Monster Energy British Grand Prix
- Location: Silverstone Circuit; Silverstone, United Kingdom
- Course: Permanent racing facility; 5.900 km (3.666 mi)

MotoGP
Pole position
Rider	(France) Johann Zarco	Ducati
Time	1:57.767	
Fastest lap
Rider	(Spain) Álex Rins	Suzuki
Time	1:59.346 on lap 4	
Podium
First	(Italy) Francesco Bagnaia	Ducati
Second	(Spain) Maverick Viñales	Aprilia
Third	(Australia) Jack Miller	Ducati

Moto2
Pole position
Rider	(Spain) Augusto Fernández	Kalex
Time	2:04.103	
Fastest lap
Rider	(Spain) Augusto Fernández	Kalex
Time	2:04.784 on lap 13	
Podium
First	(Spain) Augusto Fernández	Kalex
Second	(Spain) Alonso López	Boscoscuro
Third	(United Kingdom) Jake Dixon	Kalex

Moto3
Pole position
Rider	(Brazil) Diogo Moreira	KTM
Time	2:10.951	
Fastest lap
Rider	(Turkey) Deniz Öncü	KTM
Time	2:11.011 on lap 11	
Podium
First	(Italy) Dennis Foggia	Honda
Second	(Spain) Jaume Masià	KTM
Third	(Turkey) Deniz Öncü	KTM

The 2022 British motorcycle Grand Prix (officially known as the Monster Energy British Grand Prix) was the twelfth round of the 2022 Grand Prix motorcycle racing season. It was held at the Silverstone Circuit in Silverstone on 7 August 2022.

After Augusto Fernández's win in the Moto2 class, Kalex secured its tenth straight Constructors' Championship.

== Background ==
=== Riders' entries ===
In the MotoGP class, Honda test rider Stefan Bradl continues to replace Marc Márquez in the Repsol Honda Team. In the Moto2 class, Piotr Biesiekirski is riding the Kalex of the SAG Team of the injured Gabriel Rodrigo in this Grand Prix, while Rory Skinner races as a wildcard with the American Racing Kalex. In the Moto3 class, the Italian Nicola Carraro replaces his compatriot Matteo Bertelle in the QJmotor Avintia Racing Team (who had already missed the Dutch TT), who will miss the rest of the season due to the injury of the crusaders.

=== MotoGP Championship standings before the race ===
After retiring in the Dutch TT, Fabio Quartararo sees his advantage in the riders' classification reduced against Aleix Espargaró: the Frenchman leads at 172 points, while the Spaniard is 22 points behind. Johann Zarco is third with 114 points, followed by Francesco Bagnaia (winner in Assen) and Enea Bastianini with respectively 106 and 105 points. In the constructors' classification, Ducati is largely confirmed in the lead with 246 points; Yamaha is second with 172 points, seventeen more than Aprilia. KTM and Suzuki are fourth and fifth with 121 and 101 points, with Honda closing the ranking with 85 points. The team classification sees Aprilia Racing overtake (213 points) against Monster Energy Yamaha MotoGP (197 points), which is reached on equal points by the Ducati Lenovo Team, which overtakes Prima Pramac Racing, now fourth with 184 points, which precedes Red Bull KTM Factory Racing fifth with 164 points.

=== Moto2 Championship standings before the race ===
The riders' classification sees three names collected within a point: Celestino Vietti is joined in the lead by Augusto Fernández (winner in the Netherlands) with 146 points, one more than Ai Ogura; Arón Canet is fourth with 116 points, followed by Tony Arbolino with 104 points. In the constructors' classification, the situation is as follows: Kalex 275 points, Boscoscuro, 57 points, MV Agusta 5 points. Red Bull KTM Ajo leads the team standings with 221 points, seven more than the Idemitsu Honda Team Asia. Flexbox HP40 is third with 178 points ahead of Elf Marc VDS Racing Team and Mooney VR46 Racing Team who have 155 and 146 points respectively.

=== Moto3 Championship standings before the race ===
The riders of the Gas Gas Aspar Team occupy the first two positions of the classification. The gap between Sergio García (182 points) and Izan Guevara (179 points) is only three points; Dennis Foggia is third with 115 points, two more than Ayumu Sasaki, victorious in the previous race, and eight more than Jaume Masià. In the constructors' classification, Gas Gas is first with 235 points and precedes Honda (181 points), KTM (174 points), Husqvarna (133 points) and CFMoto (95 points). The team classification sees Gas Gas Aspar Team dominate with 361 points, with 152 points ahead of Leopard Racing. Red Bull KTM Ajo is third with 155 points, plus 18 points behind Sterilgarda Husqvarna Max and plus 29 on Red Bull KTM Tech 3.

== Free practice ==
=== MotoGP ===
In the first session, Johann Zarco was the fastest ahead of Francesco Bagnaia and Álex Rins. In the second session Fabio Quartararo set the best time, followed by Joan Mir and Maverick Viñales. In the third session, Aleix Espargaró finished in first position, with Jorge Martín second and Jack Miller third.

=== Combinated Free Practice 1-2-3 ===
The top ten riders (written in bold) qualified in Q2.

Fastest session lap

Pos.	No.	Biker	Constructor	Free practice times		
Pos.	No.	Biker	Constructor	FP1	FP2	FP3
1	41	**(Spain) Aleix Espargaró**	**Aprilia**	2:00.630	1:59.153	**1:58.254**
2	89	**(Spain) Jorge Martín**	**Ducati**	2:00.948	1:59.657	**1:58.282**
3	43	**(Australia) Jack Miller**	**Ducati**	2:01.055	1:59.364	**1:58.332**
4	5	**(France) Johann Zarco**	**Ducati**	1:59.893	1:59.134	**1:58.344**
5	12	**(Spain) Maverick Viñales**	**Aprilia**	2:00.799	1:59.123	**1:58.575**
6	20	**(France) Fabio Quartararo**	**Yamaha**	2:00.438	1:58.946	**1:58.619**
7	63	**(Italy) Francesco Bagnaia**	**Ducati**	1:59.920	1:59.385	**1:58.625**
8	36	**(Spain) Joan Mir**	**Suzuki**	2:00.843	1:59.100	**1:58.657**
9	10	**(Italy) Luca Marini**	**Ducati**	2:01.607	1:59.396	**1:58.663**
10	42	**(Spain) Álex Rins**	**Suzuki**	2:00.220	1:59.246	**1:58.729**
11	72	(Italy) Marco Bezzecchi	Ducati	2:01.112	1:59.378	**1:58.911**
12	23	(Italy) Enea Bastianini	Ducati	2:01.219	1:59.358	**1:58.927**
13	21	(Italy) Franco Morbidelli	Yamaha	2:01.775	2:00.138	**1:59.006**
14	88	(Portugal) Miguel Oliveira	KTM	2:01.120	1:59.163	**1:59.066**
15	73	(Spain) Álex Márquez	Honda	2:01.174	1:59.789	**1:59.110**
16	44	(Spain) Pol Espargaró	Honda	2:01.040	1:59.852	**1:59.225**
17	4	(Italy) Andrea Dovizioso	Yamaha	2:01.748	2:00.043	**1:59.240**
18	49	(Italy) Fabio Di Giannantonio	Ducati	2:02.179	1:59.986	**1:59.485**
19	33	(South Africa) Brad Binder	KTM	2:00.994	2:00.144	**1:59.531**
20	30	(Japan) Takaaki Nakagami	Honda	2:00.448	2:00.003	**1:59.623**
21	87	(Australia) Remy Gardner	KTM	2:01.539	2:00.154	**1:59.649**
22	6	(Germany) Stefan Bradl	Honda	2:02.062	**1:59.801**	1:59.815
23	25	(Spain) Raúl Fernández	KTM	2:01.578	2:02.062	**2:00.065**
24	40	(South Africa) Darryn Binder	Yamaha	2:02.565	2:01.528	**2:00.639**
OFFICIAL MOTOGP COMBINED FREE PRACTICE TIMES REPORT

=== Free practice 4 ===
Johann Zarco was the fastest, followed Maverick Viñales and Jack Miller.

=== Moto2 ===
In the first session, home rider Jake Dixon was the fastest ahead of Augusto Fernández and Arón Canet. In the second session the roles are reversed between Fernández and Dixon, with Alonso López third, while in the third session the first three positions are identical to FP1.

=== Combinated Free Practice ===
The top fourteen riders (written in bold) qualified in Q2.

Fastest session lap

Pos.	No.	Biker	Constructor	Free practice times		
Pos.	No.	Biker	Constructor	FP1	FP2	FP3
1	96	**(United Kingdom) Jake Dixon**	**Kalex**	2:05.409	2:04.760	**2:04.107**
2	37	**(Spain) Augusto Fernández**	**Kalex**	2:05.475	2:04.573	**2:04.508**
3	40	(Spain) **Arón Canet**	**Kalex**	2:05.875	2:05.639	**2:04.636**
4	79	**(Japan) Ai Ogura**	**Kalex**	2:06.356	2:05.471	**2:04.819**
5	64	(Netherlands) **Bo Bendsneyder**	**Kalex**	2:06.379	2:05.618	**2:04.828**
6	21	**(Spain) Alonso López**	**Boscoscuro**	2:05.988	2:05.129	**2:04.844**
7	75	(Spain) **Albert Arenas**	**Kalex**	2:06.532	2:05.358	**2:04.887**
8	6	**(United States) Cameron Beaubier**	**Kalex**	2:06.719	2:05.512	**2:04.911**
9	16	**(United States)** **Joe Roberts**	**Kalex**	2:06.150	2:05.627	**2:04.928**
10	13	**(Italy) Celestino Vietti**	**Kalex**	2:06.903	2:05.546	**2:04.996**
11	12	(Czech Republic) **Filip Salač**	**Kalex**	2:07.182	2:05.414	**2:05.003**
12	14	(Italy) **Tony Arbolino**	**Kalex**	2:06.500	**2:05.149**	2:05.336
13	52	(Spain) **Jeremy Alcoba**	**Kalex**	2:07.211	2:06.896	**2:05.153**
14	23	(Germany) **Marcel Schrötter**	**Kalex**	2:06.762	2:05.590	**2:05.171**
15	61	(Italy) Alessandro Zaccone	Kalex	2:08.892	2:06.412	**2:05.300**
16	18	(Spain) Manuel González	Kalex	2:06.584	2:05.773	**2:05.400**
17	54	(Spain) Fermín Aldeguer	Boscoscuro	2:06.533	2:05.669	**2:05.479**
18	19	(Italy) Lorenzo Dalla Porta	Kalex	2:08.700	2:06.833	**2:05.488**
19	7	(Belgium) Barry Baltus	Kalex	2:06.389	2:05.679	**2:05.504**
20	35	(Thailand) Somkiat Chantra	Kalex	2:06.962	2:05.696	**2:05.663**
21	9	(Spain) Jorge Navarro	Kalex	2:06.905	2:05.830	**2:05.735**
22	42	(Spain) Marcos Ramírez	MV Agusta	2:06.902	2:06.552	**2:06.180**
23	24	(Italy) Simone Corsi	MV Agusta	2:07.920	2:06.709	**2:06.371**
24	28	(Italy) Niccolò Antonelli	Kalex	2:07.529	2:06.675	**2:06.386**
25	84	(Netherlands) Zonta van den Goorbergh	Kalex	2:11.177	2:08.840	**2:06.770**
26	33	(United Kingdom) Rory Skinner	Kalex	2:08.812	2:08.250	**2:06.830**
27	4	(United States) Sean Dylan Kelly	Kalex	2:08.127	2:07.113	**2:06.902**
28	74	(Poland) Piotr Biesiekirski	Kalex	2:10.651	2:08.898	**2:06.979**
29	81	(Thailand) Keminth Kubo	Kalex	2:09.228	**2:07.998**	2:08.116
OFFICIAL MOTO2 COMBINED FREE PRACTICE TIMES REPORT

=== Moto3 ===
In the first session Sergio García was the fastest, with Dennis Foggia and Lorenzo Fellon second and third respectively. In the second session the home rider John McPhee preceded Izan Guevara and Xavier Artigas. In the third session Tatsuki Suzuki finished in first position, followed by Deniz Öncü and Daniel Holgado. Sergio García, the championship leader, is eighteenth in the combined standings and is forced to compete in Q1.

=== Combinated Free Practice ===
The top fourteen riders (written in bold) qualified in Q2.

Fastest session lap

Pos.	No.	Biker	Constructor	Free practice times		
Pos.	No.	Biker	Constructor	FP1	FP2	FP3
1	24	**(Japan) Tatsuki Suzuki**	**Honda**	2:13.619	2:11.549	**2:10.713**
2	53	**(Turkey) Deniz Öncü**	**KTM**	2:12.977	2:12.320	**2:10.833**
3	17	(United Kingdom) **John McPhee**	**Husqvarna**	2:13.304	**2:10.939**	2:12.189
4	96	**(Spain)** **Daniel Holgado**	**KTM**	2:13.411	2:12.333	**2:10.966**
5	16	(Italy) **Andrea Migno**	**Honda**	2:13.957	2:11.690	**2:10.972**
6	71	**(Japan) Ayumu Sasaki**	**Husqvarna**	2:13.246	2:11.913	**2:11.097**
7	10	(Brazil) **Diogo Moreira**	**KTM**	2:13.251	2:12.451	**2:11.223**
8	7	**(Italy) Dennis Foggia**	**Honda**	2:12.909	2:11.726	**2:11.247**
9	82	**(Italy)** **Stefano Nepa**	**KTM**	2:13.552	2:12.130	**2:11.285**
10	27	**(Japan) Kaito Toba**	**KTM**	2:13.164	2:12.566	**2:11.320**
11	6	(Japan) **Ryusei Yamanaka**	**KTM**	2:13.152	2:12.387	**2:11.347**
12	28	(Spain) **Izan Guevara**	**Gas Gas**	2:13.190	**2:11.372**	2:11.483
13	20	(France) **Lorenzo Fellon**	**Honda**	2:12.929	2:11.683	**2:11.494**
14	48	(Spain) **Iván Ortolá**	**KTM**	2:14.782	2:12.898	**2:11.517**
15	43	(Spain) Xavier Artigas	CFMoto	2:13.848	**2:11.523**	2:11.839
16	19	(United Kingdom) Scott Ogden	Honda	2:13.565	2:12.338	**2:11.532**
17	54	(Italy) Riccardo Rossi	Honda	2:13.340	2:11.944	**2:11.577**
18	11	(Spain) Sergio García	Gas Gas	2:12.868	2:12.436	**2:11.691**
19	44	(Spain) David Muñoz	KTM	2:13.501	**2:11.705**	2:11.957
20	5	(Spain) Jaume Masià	KTM	2:13.336	**2:11.735**	2:12.334
21	31	(Spain) Adrián Fernández	KTM	2:13.931	2:12.020	**2:11.828**
22	99	(Spain) Carlos Tatay	CFMoto	2:13.908	2:12.645	**2:11.959**
23	9	(Italy) Nicola Carraro	KTM	2:17.490	2:13.912	**2:11.976**
24	64	(Indonesia) Mario Aji	Honda	2:14.679	2:13.946	**2:12.372**
25	23	(Italy) Elia Bartolini	KTM	2:16.268	2:13.166	**2:12.427**
26	67	(Italy) Alberto Surra	Honda	2:14.116	2:12.939	**2:12.623**
27	70	(United Kingdom) Joshua Whatley	Honda	2:15.069	2:14.489	**2:13.462**
28	72	(Japan) Taiyo Furusato	Honda	2:16.188	2:14.260	**2:13.720**
29	22	(Spain) Ana Carrasco	KTM	2:16.571	2:14.748	**2:14.181**
30	41	(Spain) Marc García	KTM	2:17.728	**2:14.680**	2:14.801
OFFICIAL MOTO3 COMBINED FREE PRACTICE TIMES REPORT

== Qualifying ==
=== MotoGP ===
Fastest session lap

Pos.	No.	Biker	Constructor	Qualifying times		Final grid	Row
Pos.	No.	Biker	Constructor	Q1	Q2	Final grid	Row
1	5	(France) Johann Zarco	Ducati	Qualified in Q2	1:57.767	1	1
2	12	(Spain) Maverick Viñales	Aprilia	Qualified in Q2	1:57.865	2	1
3	43	(Australia) Jack Miller	Ducati	Qualified in Q2	1:57.931	3	1
4	20	(France) Fabio Quartararo	Yamaha	Qualified in Q2	1:57.938	4	2
5	63	(Italy) Francesco Bagnaia	Ducati	Qualified in Q2	1:57.961	5	2
6	41	(Spain) Aleix Espargaró	Aprilia	Qualified in Q2	1:57.996	6	2
7	72	(Italy) Marco Bezzecchi	Ducati	1:58.756	1:58.101	7	3
8	23	(Italy) Enea Bastianini	Ducati	1:58.609	1:58.106	8	3
9	89	(Spain) Jorge Martín	Ducati	Qualified in Q2	1:58.174	9	3
10	10	(Italy) Luca Marini	Ducati	Qualified in Q2	1:58.317	10	4
11	42	(Spain) Álex Rins	Suzuki	Qualified in Q2	1:58.318	11	4
12	36	(Spain) Joan Mir	Suzuki	Qualified in Q2	1:58.543	12	4
13	88	(Portugal) Miguel Oliveira	KTM	1:58.853	N/A	13	5
14	33	(South Africa) Brad Binder	KTM	1:58.932	N/A	14	5
15	49	(Italy) Fabio Di Giannantonio	Ducati	1:58.948	N/A	15	5
16	87	(Australia) Remy Gardner	KTM	1:59.120	N/A	16	6
17	73	(Spain) Álex Márquez	Honda	1:59.288	N/A	17	6
18	6	(Germany) Stefan Bradl	Honda	1:59.339	N/A	18	6
19	44	(Spain) Pol Espargaró	Honda	1:59.367	N/A	19	7
20	21	(Italy) Franco Morbidelli	Yamaha	1:59.390	N/A	20	7
21	30	(Japan) Takaaki Nakagami	Honda	1:59.614	N/A	21	7
22	25	(Spain) Raúl Fernández	KTM	1:59.920	N/A	22	8
23	40	(South Africa) Darryn Binder	Yamaha	1:59.931	N/A	23	8
24	4	(Italy) Andrea Dovizioso	Yamaha	2:00.232	N/A	24	8
OFFICIAL MOTOGP QUALIFYING RESULTS

=== Moto2 ===
Fastest session lap

Pos.	No.	Biker	Constructor	Qualifying times		Final grid	Row
Pos.	No.	Biker	Constructor	Q1	Q2	Final grid	Row
1	37	(Spain) Augusto Fernández	Kalex	Qualified in Q2	2:04.103	1	1
2	16	(United States) Joe Roberts	Kalex	Qualified in Q2	2:04.137	2	1
3	79	(Japan) Ai Ogura	Kalex	Qualified in Q2	2:04.280	3	1
4	75	(Spain) Albert Arenas	Kalex	Qualified in Q2	2:04.386	4	2
5	13	(Italy) Celestino Vietti	Kalex	Qualified in Q2	2:04.498	5	2
6	96	(United Kingdom) Jake Dixon	Kalex	Qualified in Q2	2:04.505	6	2
7	64	(Netherlands) Bo Bendsneyder	Kalex	Qualified in Q2	2:04.560	7	3
8	21	(Spain) Alonso López	Boscoscuro	Qualified in Q2	2:04.697	8	3
9	23	(Germany) Marcel Schrötter	Kalex	Qualified in Q2	2:04.887	9	3
10	40	(Spain) Arón Canet	Kalex	Qualified in Q2	2:04.891	10	4
11	14	(Italy) Tony Arbolino	Kalex	Qualified in Q2	2:04.899	11	4
12	9	(Spain) Jorge Navarro	Kalex	2:04.670	2:04.909	12	4
13	6	(United States) Cameron Beaubier	Kalex	Qualified in Q2	2:04.934	13	5
14	52	(Spain) Jeremy Alcoba	Kalex	Qualified in Q2	2:05.058	14	5
15	18	(Spain) Manuel González	Kalex	2:04.788	2:05.090	15	5
16	35	(Thailand) Somkiat Chantra	Kalex	2:05.156	2:05.197	16	6
17	12	(Czech Republic) Filip Salač	Kalex	Qualified in Q2	2:05.342	17	6
18	61	(Italy) Alessandro Zaccone	Kalex	2:04.905	2:05.449	18	6
19	19	(Italy) Lorenzo Dalla Porta	Kalex	2.05.175	N/A	19	7
20	54	(Spain) Fermín Aldeguer	Boscoscuro	2:05.227	N/A	20	7
21	7	(Belgium) Barry Baltus	Kalex	2:05.485	N/A	21	7
22	84	(Netherlands) Zonta van den Goorbergh	Kalex	2:05.691	N/A	22	8
23	42	(Spain) Marcos Ramírez	MV Agusta	2:05.763	N/A	23	8
24	33	(United Kingdom) Rory Skinner	Kalex	2:05.937	N/A	24	8
25	24	(Italy) Simone Corsi	MV Agusta	2:06.138	N/A	25	9
26	28	(Italy) Niccolò Antonelli	Kalex	2:06.220	N/A	26	9
27	81	(Thailand) Keminth Kubo	Kalex	2:06.441	N/A	27	9
28	4	(United States) Sean Dylan Kelly	Kalex	2:06.543	N/A	28	10
29	74	(Poland) Piotr Biesiekirski	Kalex	2:07.270	N/A	29	10
OFFICIAL MOTO2 QUALIFYING RESULTS

=== Moto3 ===
Fastest session lap

Pos.	No.	Biker	Constructor	Qualifying times		Final grid	Row
Pos.	No.	Biker	Constructor	Q1	Q2	Final grid	Row
1	10	(Brazil) Diogo Moreira	KTM	Qualified in Q2	2:10.951	1	1
2	28	(Spain) Izan Guevara	Gas Gas	Qualified in Q2	2:11.019	2	1
3	6	(Japan) Ryusei Yamanaka	KTM	Qualified in Q2	2:11.029	3	1
4	54	(Italy) Riccardo Rossi	Honda	2:11.458	2:11.059	4	2
5	82	(Italy) Stefano Nepa	KTM	Qualified in Q2	2:11.131	5	2
6	53	(Turkey) Deniz Öncü	KTM	Qualified in Q2	2:11.180	6	2
7	7	(Italy) Dennis Foggia	Honda	Qualified in Q2	2:11.206	7	3
8	24	(Japan) Tatsuki Suzuki	Honda	Qualified in Q2	2:11.245	8	3
9	71	(Japan) Ayumu Sasaki	Husqvarna	Qualified in Q2	2:11.457	9	3
10	17	(United Kingdom) John McPhee	Husqvarna	Qualified in Q2	2:11.560	10	4
11	11	(Spain) Sergio García	Gas Gas	2:11.558	2:11.570	11	4
12	96	(Spain) Daniel Holgado	KTM	Qualified in Q2	2:11.623	12	4
13	16	(Italy) Andrea Migno	Honda	Qualified in Q2	2:11.628	13	5
14	27	(Japan) Kaito Toba	KTM	Qualified in Q2	2:11.646	14	5
15	43	(Spain) Xavier Artigas	CFMoto	2:11.532	2:11.827	15	5
16	20	(France) Lorenzo Fellon	Honda	Qualified in Q2	2:12.155	16	6
17	72	(Japan) Taiyo Furusato	Honda	2:11.630	2:12.255	17	6
18	48	(Spain) Iván Ortolá	KTM	Qualified in Q2	2:12.699	18	6
19	44	(Spain) David Muñoz	KTM	2.11.732	N/A	19	7
20	31	(Spain) Adrián Fernández	KTM	2:11.750	N/A	20	7
21	5	(Spain) Jaume Masià	KTM	2:11.787	N/A	21	7
22	99	(Spain) Carlos Tatay	CFMoto	2:11.827	N/A	22	8
23	23	(Italy) Elia Bartolini	KTM	2:12.061	N/A	23	8
24	19	(United Kingdom) Scott Ogden	Honda	2:12.289	N/A	24	8
25	9	(Italy) Nicola Carraro	KTM	2:12.340	N/A	25	9
26	70	(United Kingdom) Joshua Whatley	Honda	2:12.631	N/A	26	9
27	67	(Italy) Alberto Surra	Honda	2:12.651	N/A	27	9
28	64	(Indonesia) Mario Aji	Honda	2:13.818	N/A	28	10
29	22	(Spain) Ana Carrasco	KTM	2:14.092	N/A	29	10
30	41	(Spain) Marc García	KTM	2:14.602	N/A	30	
OFFICIAL MOTO3 QUALIFYING RESULTS

== Warm up ==
=== MotoGP ===
Maverick Viñales finished at the top of the standings ahead of Suzuki riders Álex Rins and Joan Mir.

=== Moto2 ===
Augusto Fernández preceded compatriots Alonso López and Arón Canet.

=== Moto3 ===
The first three places in the ranking are occupied by Deniz Öncü, Dennis Foggia and David Muñoz.

== Race ==
=== MotoGP ===
Pos.	No.	Biker	Team	Constructor	Laps	Time/Retired	Grid	Points
1	63	(Italy) Francesco Bagnaia	Ducati Lenovo Team	Ducati	20	40:10.260	5	25
2	12	(Spain) Maverick Viñales	Aprilia Racing	Aprilia	20	+0.426	2	20
3	43	(Australia) Jack Miller	Ducati Lenovo Team	Ducati	20	+0.614	3	16
4	23	(Italy) Enea Bastianini	Gresini Racing MotoGP	Ducati	20	+1.651	8	13
5	89	(Spain) Jorge Martín	Prima Pramac Racing	Ducati	20	+1.750	9	11
6	88	(Portugal) Miguel Oliveira	Red Bull KTM Factory Racing	KTM	20	+2.727	13	10
7	42	(Spain) Álex Rins	Team Suzuki Ecstar	Suzuki	20	+3.021	11	9
8	20	(France) Fabio Quartararo	Monster Energy Yamaha MotoGP	Yamaha	20	+3.819	4	8
9	41	(Spain) Aleix Espargaró	Aprilia Racing	Aprilia	20	+3.958	6	7
10	72	(Italy) Marco Bezzecchi	Mooney VR46 Racing Team	Ducati	20	+6.646	7	6
11	33	(South Africa) Brad Binder	Red Bull KTM Factory Racing	KTM	20	+7.730	14	5
12	10	(Italy) Luca Marini	Mooney VR46 Racing Team	Ducati	20	+13.439	10	4
13	30	(Japan) Takaaki Nakagami	LCR Honda Idemitsu	Honda	20	+13.706	20	3
14	44	(Spain) Pol Espargaró	Repsol Honda Team	Honda	20	+13.906	18	2
15	21	(Italy) Franco Morbidelli	Monster Energy Yamaha MotoGP	Yamaha	20	+16.359	19	1
16	04	(Italy) Andrea Dovizioso	WithU Yamaha RNF MotoGP Team	Yamaha	20	+20.805	24	
17	73	(Spain) Álex Márquez	LCR Honda Castrol	Honda	20	+21.099	17	
18	87	(Australia) Remy Gardner	Tech3 KTM Factory Racing	KTM	20	+24.579	16	
19	6	(Germany) Stefan Bradl	Repsol Honda Team	Honda	20	+28.773	21	
20	40	(South Africa) Darryn Binder	WithU Yamaha RNF MotoGP Team	Yamaha	20	+33.653	23	
21	25	(Spain) Raúl Fernández	Tech3 KTM Factory Racing	KTM	20	+35.601	22	
22	49	(Italy) Fabio Di Giannantonio	Gresini Racing Team	Ducati	20	+36.640	15	
Ret	36	(Spain) Joan Mir	Team Suzuki Ecstar	Suzuki	14	Accident	12	
Ret	5	(France) Johann Zarco	Prima Pramac Racing	Ducati	8	Accident Damage	1	
Fastest lap: (Spain) Álex Rins (Suzuki) – 1:59.346 (lap 4)
OFFICIAL MOTOGP RACE REPORT

=== Moto2 ===
Pos.	No.	Biker	Constructor	Laps	Time/Retired	Grid	Points
1	37	(Spain) Augusto Fernández	Kalex	18	37:38.670	1	25
2	21	(Spain) Alonso Lopez	Boscoscuro	18	+0.070	8	20
3	96	(United Kingdom) Jake Dixon	Kalex	18	+0.662	6	16
4	79	(Japan) Ai Ogura	Kalex	18	+1.741	3	13
5	40	(Spain) Arón Canet	Kalex	18	+1.946	10	11
6	13	(Italy) Celestino Vietti	Kalex	18	+5.440	5	10
7	16	(United States) Joe Roberts	Kalex	18	+7.528	2	9
8	9	(Spain) Jorge Navarro	Kalex	18	+10.647	12	8
9	12	(Czech Republic) Filip Salač	Kalex	18	+11.646	17	7
10	64	(Netherlands) Bo Bendsneyder	Kalex	18	+12.259	7	6
11	18	(Spain) Manuel González	Kalex	18	+14.040	15	5
12	14	(Italy) Tony Arbolino	Kalex	18	+14.802	11	4
13	35	(Thailand) Somkiat Chantra	Kalex	18	+16.098	16	3
14	52	(Spain) Jeremy Alcoba	Kalex	18	+17.285	14	2
15	54	(Spain) Fermín Aldeguer	Boscoscuro	18	+19.253	20	1
16	7	(Belgium) Barry Baltus	Kalex	18	+19.336	21	
17	19	(Italy) Lorenzo Dalla Porta	Kalex	18	+27.544	19	
18	61	(Italy) Alessandro Zaccone	Kalex	18	+32.993	18	
19	28	(Italy) Niccolò Antonelli	Kalex	18	+34.996	26	
20	24	(Italy) Simone Corsi	MV Agusta	18	+40.187	25	
21	33	(United Kingdom) Rory Skinner	Kalex	18	+40.601	24	
22	4	(United States) Sean Dylan Kelly	Kalex	18	+40.943	28	
23	81	(Thailand) Keminth Kubo	Kalex	18	+45.026	27	
24	74	(Poland) Piotr Biesiekirski	Kalex	18	+56.612	29	
Ret	23	(Germany) Marcel Schrötter	Kalex	16	Accident	9	
Ret	75	(Spain) Albert Arenas	Kalex	10	Accident	4	
Ret	42	(Spain) Marcos Ramírez	MV Agusta	7	Accident	23	
Ret	6	(United States) Cameron Beaubier	Kalex	4	Accident	13	
Ret	84	(Netherlands) Zonta van den Goorbergh	Kalex	3	Accident	22	
DNS	22	(United Kingdom) Sam Lowes	Kalex		Did not start		
DNS	51	(Spain) Pedro Acosta	Kalex		Did not start		
Fastest lap: (Spain) Augusto Fernández (Kalex) – 2:04.784 (lap 13)
OFFICIAL MOTO2 RACE REPORT

- Pedro Acosta withdrew from the event due to effects of a broken thigh suffered at the previous round in Assen.
- Sam Lowes was declared unfit from the event following a shoulder dislocation suffered after a FP1 crash.

=== Moto3 ===
Pos.	No.	Biker	Constructor	Laps	Time/Retired	Grid	Points
1	7	(Italy) Dennis Foggia	Honda	17	37:30.120	7	25
2	5	(Spain) Jaume Masià	KTM	17	+0.252	21	20
3	53	(Turkey) Deniz Öncü	KTM	17	+0.297	6	16
4	27	(Japan) Kaito Toba	KTM	17	+0.738	14	13
5	82	(Italy) Stefano Nepa	KTM	17	+0.762	5	11
6	10	(Brazil) Diogo Moreira	KTM	17	+0.881	1	10
7	17	(United Kingdom) John McPhee	Husqvarna	17	+0.932	10	9
8	6	(Japan) Ryusei Yamanaka	KTM	17	+0.936	3	8
9	16	(Italy) Andrea Migno	Honda	17	+1.108	13	7
10	99	(Spain) Carlos Tatay	CFMoto	17	+1.790	22	6
11	43	(Spain) Xavier Artigas	CFMoto	17	+1.827	15	5
12	19	(United Kingdom) Scott Ogden	Honda	17	+2.050	24	4
13	20	(France) Lorenzo Fellon	Honda	17	+2.186	16	3
14	54	(Italy) Riccardo Rossi	Honda	17	+2.383	4	2
15	31	(Spain) Adrián Fernández	KTM	17	+21.029	20	1
16	23	(Italy) Elia Bartolini	KTM	17	+21.064	23	
17	64	(Indonesia) Mario Aji	Honda	17	+21.188	28	
18	72	(Japan) Taiyo Furusato	Honda	17	+21.243	17	
19	67	(Italy) Alberto Surra	Honda	17	+21.430	27	
20	9	(Italy) Nicola Carraro	KTM	17	+21.454	25	
21	70	(United Kingdom) Joshua Whatley	Honda	17	+30.280	26	
22	41	(Spain) Marc García	KTM	17	+42.153	30	
23	22	(Spain) Ana Carrasco	KTM	17	+42.165	29	
NC	96	(Spain) Daniel Holgado	KTM	17	+38.762 (Note: Not classified due to finishing the race through the pits.)	12	
Ret	44	(Spain) David Muñoz	KTM	16	Accident	19	
Ret	24	(Japan) Tatsuki Suzuki	Honda	16	Accident	8	
Ret	28	(Spain) Izan Guevara	Gas Gas	16	Accident	2	
Ret	48	(Spain) Iván Ortolá	KTM	16	Accident	18	
Ret	71	(Japan) Ayumu Sasaki	Husqvarna	14	Collision	9	
Ret	11	(Spain) Sergio García	Gas Gas	14	Collision	11	
Fastest lap: (Turkey) Deniz Öncü (KTM) – 2:11.011 (lap 11)
OFFICIAL MOTO3 RACE REPORT

== Championship standings after the race ==
Below are the standings for the top five riders, constructors, and teams after the round.

=== MotoGP ===
Riders' Championship standings

	Pos.	Rider	Points
	1	(France) Fabio Quartararo	180
	2	(Spain) Aleix Espargaró	158
1	3	(Italy) Francesco Bagnaia	131
1	4	(Italy) Enea Bastianini	118
2	5	(France) Johann Zarco	114

Constructors' Championship standings

Pos.	Constructor	Points
1	(Italy) Ducati	271
2	(Japan) Yamaha	180
3	(Italy) Aprilia	175
4	(Austria) KTM	131
5	(Japan) Suzuki	110

Teams' Championship standings

	Pos.	Team	Points
	1	(Italy) Aprilia Racing	240
1	2	(Italy) Ducati Lenovo Team	238
1	3	(Japan) Monster Energy Yamaha MotoGP	206
	4	(Italy) Prima Pramac Racing	195
	5	(Austria) Red Bull KTM Factory Racing	179

=== Moto2 ===
Riders' Championship standings

	Pos.	Rider	Points
1	1	(Spain) Augusto Fernández	171
1	2	(Japan) Ai Ogura	158
2	3	(Italy) Celestino Vietti	156
	4	(Spain) Arón Canet	127
	5	(Italy) Tony Arbolino	108

Constructors' Championship standings

Pos.	Constructor	Points
1	(Germany) Kalex	300
2	(Italy) Boscoscuro	77
3	(Italy) MV Agusta	5

Teams' Championship standings

Pos.	Team	Points
1	(Finland) Red Bull KTM Ajo	246
2	(Japan) Idemitsu Honda Team Asia	230
3	(Spain) Flexbox HP40	197
4	(Belgium) Elf Marc VDS Racing Team	159
5	(Italy) Mooney VR46 Racing Team	156

=== Moto3 ===
Riders' Championship standings

	Pos.	Rider	Points
	1	(Spain) Sergio García	182
	2	(Spain) Izan Guevara	179
	3	(Italy) Dennis Foggia	140
1	4	(Spain) Jaume Masià	127
1	5	(Turkey) Deniz Öncü	114

Constructors' Championship standings

Pos.	Constructor	Points
1	(Spain) Gas Gas	235
2	(Japan) Honda	206
3	(Austria) KTM	194
4	(Sweden) Husqvarna	142
5	(China) CFMoto	101

Teams' Championship standings

Pos.	Team	Points
1	(Spain) Gaviota GasGas Aspar Team	361
2	(Luxembourg) Leopard Racing	234
3	(Finland) Red Bull KTM Ajo	175
4	(Italy) Sterilgarda Husqvarna Max	146
5	(France) Red Bull KTM Tech3	143

== Notes ==
Previous race: 2022 Dutch TT	FIM Grand Prix World Championship; 2022 season	Next race: 2022 Austrian Grand Prix
Previous race: 2021 British Grand Prix	British motorcycle Grand Prix	Next race: 2023 British Grand Prix
