= 2022 German motorcycle Grand Prix =

Tenth round of the 2022 Grand Prix motorcycle racing season

(Germany) 2022 German Grand Prix
Race details
- Race 10 of 20 races in the 2022 Grand Prix motorcycle racing season
- Date: 19 June 2022
- Official name: Liqui Moly Motorrad Grand Prix Deutschland
- Location: Sachsenring; Hohenstein-Ernstthal, Germany
- Course: Permanent racing facility; 3.671 km (2.281 mi)

MotoGP
Pole position
Rider	(Italy) Francesco Bagnaia	Ducati
Time	1:19.931	
Fastest lap
Rider	(France) Fabio Quartararo	Yamaha
Time	1:21.584 on lap 3	
Podium
First	(France) Fabio Quartararo	Yamaha
Second	(France) Johann Zarco	Ducati
Third	(Australia) Jack Miller	Ducati

Moto2
Pole position
Rider	(United Kingdom) Sam Lowes	Kalex
Time	1:23.493	
Fastest lap
Rider	(Spain) Augusto Fernández	Kalex
Time	1:24.331 on lap 4	
Podium
First	(Spain) Augusto Fernández	Kalex
Second	(Spain) Pedro Acosta	Kalex
Third	(United Kingdom) Sam Lowes	Kalex

Moto3
Pole position
Rider	(Spain) Izan Guevara	Gas Gas
Time	1:25.869	
Fastest lap
Rider	(Turkey) Deniz Öncü	KTM
Time	1:26.253 on lap 4	
Podium
First	(Spain) Izan Guevara	Gas Gas
Second	(Italy) Dennis Foggia	Honda
Third	(Spain) Sergio García	Gas Gas

The 2022 German motorcycle Grand Prix (officially known as the Liqui Moly Motorrad Grand Prix Deutschland) was the tenth round of the 2022 Grand Prix motorcycle racing season. It was held at the Sachsenring in Hohenstein-Ernstthal on 19 June 2022.

== Race ==
=== MotoGP ===
Pos.	No.	Biker	Team	Constructor	Laps	Time/Retired	Grid	Points
1	20	(France) Fabio Quartararo	Monster Energy Yamaha MotoGP	Yamaha	30	41:12.861	2	25
2	5	(France) Johann Zarco	Prima Pramac Racing	Ducati	30	+4.939	3	20
3	43	(Australia) Jack Miller	Ducati Lenovo Team	Ducati	30	+8.372	6	16
4	41	(Spain) Aleix Espargaró	Aprilia Racing	Aprilia	30	+9.113	4	13
5	10	(Italy) Luca Marini	Mooney VR46 Racing Team	Ducati	30	+11.679	7	11
6	89	(Spain) Jorge Martín	Prima Pramac Racing	Ducati	30	+13.164	8	10
7	33	(South Africa) Brad Binder	Red Bull KTM Factory Racing	KTM	30	+15.405	15	9
8	49	(Italy) Fabio Di Giannantonio	Gresini Racing MotoGP	Ducati	30	+15.851	5	8
9	88	(Portugal) Miguel Oliveira	Red Bull KTM Factory Racing	KTM	30	+19.740	14	7
10	23	(Italy) Enea Bastianini	Gresini Racing MotoGP	Ducati	30	+21.611	17	6
11	72	(Italy) Marco Bezzecchi	Mooney VR46 Racing Team	Ducati	30	+23.175	11	5
12	25	(Spain) Raúl Fernández	Tech3 KTM Factory Racing	KTM	30	+26.548	22	4
13	21	(Italy) Franco Morbidelli	Monster Energy Yamaha MotoGP	Yamaha	30	+29.014	20	3
14	04	(Italy) Andrea Dovizioso	WithU Yamaha RNF MotoGP Team	Yamaha	30	+30.680	19	2
15	87	(Australia) Remy Gardner	Tech3 KTM Factory Racing	KTM	30	+30.812	21	1
16	6	(Germany) Stefan Bradl	Repsol Honda Team	Honda	30	+52.040	18	
Ret	44	(Spain) Pol Espargaró	Repsol Honda Team	Honda	22	Rider In Pain	13	
Ret	12	(Spain) Maverick Viñales	Aprilia Racing	Aprilia	19	Ride-Height System	9	
Ret	30	(Japan) Takaaki Nakagami	LCR Honda Idemitsu	Honda	6	Accident	10	
Ret	73	(Spain) Álex Márquez	LCR Honda Castrol	Honda	6	Engine	16	
Ret	40	(South Africa) Darryn Binder	WithU Yamaha RNF MotoGP Team	Yamaha	5	Accident	23	
Ret	63	(Italy) Francesco Bagnaia	Ducati Lenovo Team	Ducati	3	Accident	1	
Ret	36	(Spain) Joan Mir	Team Suzuki Ecstar	Suzuki	3	Accident	12	
DNS	42	(Spain) Álex Rins	Team Suzuki Ecstar	Suzuki		Did not start		
Fastest lap: (France) Fabio Quartararo (Yamaha) – 1:21.584 (lap 3)
OFFICIAL MOTOGP RACE REPORT

- Álex Rins withdrew from the event due to the effects of a shoulder injury suffered at the previous round in Barcelona.

=== Moto2 ===
Pos.	No.	Biker	Constructor	Laps	Time/Retired	Grid	Points
1	37	(Spain) Augusto Fernández	Kalex	28	39:44.019	3	25
2	51	(Spain) Pedro Acosta	Kalex	28	+7.704	11	20
3	22	(United Kingdom) Sam Lowes	Kalex	28	+7.844	1	16
4	23	(Germany) Marcel Schrötter	Kalex	28	+7.959	5	13
5	54	(Spain) Fermín Aldeguer	Boscoscuro	28	+11.169	13	11
6	75	(Spain) Albert Arenas	Kalex	28	+11.635	2	10
7	21	(Spain) Alonso Lopez	Boscoscuro	28	+12.805	12	9
8	79	(Japan) Ai Ogura	Kalex	28	+13.639	14	8
9	40	(Spain) Arón Canet	Kalex	28	+13.764	6	7
10	14	(Italy) Tony Arbolino	Kalex	28	+13.800	7	6
11	96	(United Kingdom) Jake Dixon	Kalex	28	+18.553	4	5
12	18	(Spain) Manuel González	Kalex	28	+18.661	17	4
13	16	(United States) Joe Roberts	Kalex	28	+21.789	9	3
14	6	(United States) Cameron Beaubier	Kalex	28	+23.127	10	2
15	35	(Thailand) Somkiat Chantra	Kalex	28	+26.420	21	1
16	64	(Netherlands) Bo Bendsneyder	Kalex	28	+28.606	18	
17	4	(United States) Sean Dylan Kelly	Kalex	28	+39.217	23	
18	84	(Netherlands) Zonta van den Goorbergh	Kalex	28	+46.429	24	
19	61	(Italy) Alessandro Zaccone	Kalex	28	+46.785	26	
20	52	(Spain) Jeremy Alcoba	Kalex	28	+47.302	30	
21	55	(Spain) Álex Toledo	Kalex	28	+56.066	29	
Ret	13	(Italy) Celestino Vietti	Kalex	21	Accident	8	
Ret	81	(Thailand) Keminth Kubo	Kalex	20	Accident	28	
Ret	42	(Spain) Marcos Ramírez	MV Agusta	19	Retired	22	
Ret	12	(Czech Republic) Filip Salač	Kalex	18	Accident	16	
Ret	7	(Belgium) Barry Baltus	Kalex	17	Accident	19	
Ret	28	(Italy) Niccolò Antonelli	Kalex	10	Accident	27	
Ret	19	(Italy) Lorenzo Dalla Porta	Kalex	10	Shoulder Pain	15	
Ret	24	(Italy) Simone Corsi	MV Agusta	7	Overheating	25	
Ret	9	(Spain) Jorge Navarro	Kalex	3	Accident	20	
Fastest lap: (Spain) Augusto Fernández (Kalex) – 1:24.331 (lap 4)
OFFICIAL MOTO2 RACE REPORT

=== Moto3 ===
Pos.	No.	Biker	Constructor	Laps	Time/Retired	Grid	Points
1	28	(Spain) Izan Guevara	Gas Gas	27	39:14.946	1	25
2	7	(Italy) Dennis Foggia	Honda	27	+4.853	2	20
3	11	(Spain) Sergio García	Gas Gas	27	+4.964	8	16
4	71	(Japan) Ayumu Sasaki	Husqvarna	27	+5.941	4	13
5	24	(Japan) Tatsuki Suzuki	Honda	27	+9.081	5	11
6	96	(Spain) Daniel Holgado	KTM	27	+12.826	3	10
7	53	(Turkey) Deniz Öncü	KTM	27	+13.426	24	9
8	31	(Spain) Adrián Fernández	KTM	27	+14.664	14	8
9	44	(Spain) David Muñoz	KTM	27	+21.055	7	7
10	48	(Spain) Iván Ortolá	KTM	27	+21.272	26	6
11	16	(Italy) Andrea Migno	Honda	27	+21.452	12	5
12	5	(Spain) Jaume Masià	KTM	27	+21.529	18	4
13	43	(Spain) Xavier Artigas	CFMoto	27	+31.870	16	3
14 (Note: One-position penalty for exceeding track limits on the last lap.)	23	(Italy) Elia Bartolini	KTM	27	+31.792	23	2
15	82	(Italy) Stefano Nepa	KTM	27	+31.949	21	1
16	10	(Brazil) Diogo Moreira	KTM	27	+32.120	19	
17	72	(Japan) Taiyo Furusato	Honda	27	+32.228	20	
18	20	(France) Lorenzo Fellon	Honda	27	+32.321	22	
19	17	(United Kingdom) John McPhee	Husqvarna	27	+45.223	13	
20	27	(Japan) Kaito Toba	KTM	27	+51.842	27	
21	67	(Italy) Alberto Surra	KTM	27	+54.564	25	
22	22	(Spain) Ana Carrasco	KTM	27	+1:17.865	30	
23	64	(Indonesia) Mario Aji	Honda	22	+5 laps	29	
Ret	99	(Spain) Carlos Tatay	CFMoto	17	Accident Damage	17	
Ret	70	(United Kingdom) Joshua Whatley	Honda	14	Rider In Pain	28	
Ret	6	(Japan) Ryusei Yamanaka	KTM	14	Mechanical	6	
Ret	66	(Australia) Joel Kelso	KTM	9	Accident Damage	11	
Ret	19	(United Kingdom) Scott Ogden	Honda	4	Accident	10	
Ret	18	(Italy) Matteo Bertelle	KTM	4	Accident	9	
Ret	54	(Italy) Riccardo Rossi	Honda	0	Accident	15	
Fastest lap: (Turkey) Deniz Öncü (KTM) – 1:26.253 (lap 4)
OFFICIAL MOTO3 RACE REPORT

== Championship standings after the race ==
Below are the standings for the top five riders, constructors, and teams after the round.

=== MotoGP ===
Riders' Championship standings

	Pos.	Rider	Points
	1	(France) Fabio Quartararo	172
	2	(Spain) Aleix Espargaró	138
1	3	(France) Johann Zarco	111
1	4	(Italy) Enea Bastianini	100
1	5	(South Africa) Brad Binder	82

Constructors' Championship standings

Pos.	Constructor	Points
1	(Italy) Ducati	221
2	(Japan) Yamaha	172
3	(Italy) Aprilia	139
4	(Austria) KTM	110
5	(Japan) Suzuki	93

Teams' Championship standings

	Pos.	Team	Points
1	1	(Japan) Monster Energy Yamaha MotoGP	197
1	2	(Italy) Aprilia Racing	184
1	3	(Italy) Prima Pramac Racing	172
1	4	(Italy) Ducati Lenovo Team	162
1	5	(Austria) Red Bull KTM Factory Racing	146

=== Moto2 ===
Riders' Championship standings

	Pos.	Rider	Points
	1	(Italy) Celestino Vietti	133
	2	(Japan) Ai Ogura	125
1	3	(Spain) Augusto Fernández	121
1	4	(Spain) Arón Canet	116
	5	(Italy) Tony Arbolino	95

Constructors' Championship standings

Pos.	Constructor	Points
1	(Germany) Kalex	250
2	(Italy) Boscoscuro	47
3	(Italy) MV Agusta	5

Teams' Championship standings

	Pos.	Team	Points
2	1	(Finland) Red Bull KTM Ajo	196
1	2	(Japan) Idemitsu Honda Team Asia	191
1	3	(Spain) Flexbox HP40	174
1	4	(Belgium) Elf Marc VDS Racing Team	146
1	5	(Italy) Mooney VR46 Racing Team	133

=== Moto3 ===
Riders' Championship standings

	Pos.	Rider	Points
	1	(Spain) Sergio García	166
	2	(Spain) Izan Guevara	159
1	3	(Italy) Dennis Foggia	115
1	4	(Spain) Jaume Masià	107
	5	(Turkey) Deniz Öncü	91

Constructors' Championship standings

	Pos.	Constructor	Points
	1	(Spain) Gas Gas	215
1	2	(Japan) Honda	168
1	3	(Austria) KTM	164
	4	(Sweden) Husqvarna	108
	5	(China) CFMoto	84

Teams' Championship standings

	Pos.	Team	Points
	1	(Spain) GasGas Aspar Team	325
	2	(Luxembourg) Leopard Racing	196
	3	(Finland) Red Bull KTM Ajo	145
1	4	(France) Red Bull KTM Tech3	119
1	5	(Italy) Sterilgarda Husqvarna Max	112

== Notes ==
Previous race: 2022 Catalan Grand Prix	FIM Grand Prix World Championship; 2022 season	Next race: 2022 Dutch TT
Previous race: 2021 German Grand Prix	German motorcycle Grand Prix	Next race: 2023 German Grand Prix
