= 2022 Dutch TT =

Motorcycle race in Assen

(Netherlands) 2022 Dutch TT
Race details
- Race 11 of 20 races in the 2022 Grand Prix motorcycle racing season
- Date: 25–26 June 2022
- Official name: Motul TT Assen
- Location: TT Circuit Assen; Assen, Netherlands
- Course: Permanent racing facility; 4.542 km (2.822 mi)

MotoGP
Pole position
Rider	(Italy) Francesco Bagnaia	Ducati
Time	1:31.504	
Fastest lap
Rider	(Spain) Aleix Espargaró	Aprilia
Time	1:32.500 on lap 15	
Podium
First	(Italy) Francesco Bagnaia	Ducati
Second	(Italy) Marco Bezzecchi	Ducati
Third	(Spain) Maverick Viñales	Aprilia

Moto2
Pole position
Rider	(United Kingdom) Jake Dixon	Kalex
Time	1:36.736	
Fastest lap
Rider	(Italy) Celestino Vietti	Kalex
Time	1:36.729 on lap 24	
Podium
First	(Spain) Augusto Fernández	Kalex
Second	(Japan) Ai Ogura	Kalex
Third	(United Kingdom) Jake Dixon	Kalex

Moto3
Pole position
Rider	(Japan) Ayumu Sasaki	Husqvarna
Time	1:41.296	
Fastest lap
Rider	(United Kingdom) John McPhee	Husqvarna
Time	1:41.190 on lap 13	
Podium
First	(Japan) Ayumu Sasaki	Husqvarna
Second	(Spain) Izan Guevara	Gas Gas
Third	(Spain) Sergio García	Gas Gas

MotoE Race 1
Pole position
Rider	(Switzerland) Dominique Aegerter	Energica
Time	1:43.643	
Fastest lap
Rider	(Brazil) Eric Granado	Energica
Time	1:43.086 on lap 4	
Podium
First	(Switzerland) Dominique Aegerter	Energica
Second	(Brazil) Eric Granado	Energica
Third	(Italy) Mattia Casadei	Energica

MotoE Race 2
Pole position
Rider	(Switzerland) Dominique Aegerter	Energica
Time	1:43.643	
Fastest lap
Rider	(Switzerland) Dominique Aegerter	Energica
Time	1:44.926 on lap 2	
Podium
First	(Brazil) Eric Granado	Energica
Second	(Switzerland) Dominique Aegerter	Energica
Third	(Italy) Mattia Casadei	Energica

The 2022 Dutch TT (officially known as the Motul TT Assen) was the eleventh round of the 2022 Grand Prix motorcycle racing season and the fourth round of the 2022 MotoE World Cup. All races (except MotoE race 1 which was held on 25 June) were held at the TT Circuit Assen in Assen on 26 June 2022.

== Qualifying ==
=== MotoGP ===
OFFICIAL MOTOGP QUALIFYING RESULTS

== Race ==
=== MotoGP ===
Pos.	No.	Biker	Team	Constructor	Laps	Time/Retired	Grid	Points
1	63	(Italy) Francesco Bagnaia	Ducati Lenovo Team	Ducati	26	40:25.205	1	25
2	72	(Italy) Marco Bezzecchi	Mooney VR46 Racing Team	Ducati	26	+0.444	4	20
3	12	(Spain) Maverick Viñales	Aprilia Racing	Aprilia	26	+1.209	11	16
4	41	(Spain) Aleix Espargaró	Aprilia Racing	Aprilia	26	+2.585	5	13
5	33	(South Africa) Brad Binder	Red Bull KTM Factory Racing	KTM	26	+2.721	10	11
6	43	(Australia) Jack Miller	Ducati Lenovo Team	Ducati	26	+3.045	6	10
7	89	(Spain) Jorge Martín	Prima Pramac Racing	Ducati	26	+4.340	3	9
8	36	(Spain) Joan Mir	Team Suzuki Ecstar	Suzuki	26	+8.185	14	8
9	88	(Portugal) Miguel Oliveira	Red Bull KTM Factory Racing	KTM	26	+8.325	8	7
10	42	(Spain) Álex Rins	Team Suzuki Ecstar	Suzuki	26	+8.596	9	6
11	23	(Italy) Enea Bastianini	Gresini Racing MotoGP	Ducati	26	+9.783	16	5
12	30	(Japan) Takaaki Nakagami	LCR Honda Idemitsu	Honda	26	+10.617	12	4
13	5	(France) Johann Zarco	Prima Pramac Racing	Ducati	26	+14.405	7	3
14	49	(Italy) Fabio Di Giannantonio	Gresini Racing MotoGP	Ducati	26	+17.681	15	2
15	73	(Spain) Álex Márquez	LCR Honda Castrol	Honda	26	+25.866	21	1
16	04	(Italy) Andrea Dovizioso	WithU Yamaha RNF MotoGP Team	Yamaha	26	+29.711	17	
17	10	(Italy) Luca Marini	Mooney VR46 Racing Team	Ducati	26	+30.296	13	
18	6	(Germany) Stefan Bradl	Repsol Honda Team	Honda	26	+32.225	18	
19	87	(Australia) Remy Gardner	Tech3 KTM Factory Racing	KTM	26	+34.947	19	
20	32	(Italy) Lorenzo Savadori	Aprilia Racing	Aprilia	26	+35.798	22	
Ret	25	(Spain) Raúl Fernández	Tech3 KTM Factory Racing	KTM	18	Arm Pump	23	
Ret	20	(France) Fabio Quartararo	Monster Energy Yamaha MotoGP	Yamaha	11	Accident	2	
Ret	40	(South Africa) Darryn Binder	WithU Yamaha RNF MotoGP Team	Yamaha	8	Accident	24	
Ret	21	(Italy) Franco Morbidelli	Monster Energy Yamaha MotoGP	Yamaha	8	Accident Damage	20	
DNS	44	(Spain) Pol Espargaró	Repsol Honda Team	Honda		Did not start		
Fastest lap: (Spain) Aleix Espargaró (Aprilia) – 1:32.500 (lap 15)
OFFICIAL MOTOGP RACE REPORT

- Pol Espargaró withdrew from the event after FP2 due to a rib injury suffered at the German Grand Prix.

=== Moto2 ===
Pos.	No.	Biker	Constructor	Laps	Time/Retired	Grid	Points
1	37	(Spain) Augusto Fernández	Kalex	24	39:07.133	9	25
2	79	(Japan) Ai Ogura	Kalex	24	+0.660	4	20
3	96	(United Kingdom) Jake Dixon	Kalex	24	+0.725	1	16
4	13	(Italy) Celestino Vietti	Kalex	24	+0.758	11	13
5	64	(Netherlands) Bo Bendsneyder	Kalex	24	+1.485	8	11
6	21	(Spain) Alonso Lopez	Boscoscuro	24	+5.417	5	10
7	14	(Italy) Tony Arbolino	Kalex	24	+5.553	13	9
8	16	(United States) Joe Roberts	Kalex	24	+7.396	7	8
9	18	(Spain) Manuel González	Kalex	24	+7.589	15	7
10	12	(Czech Republic) Filip Salač	Kalex	24	+7.691	12	6
11	54	(Spain) Fermín Aldeguer	Boscoscuro	24	+9.322	20	5
12	9	(Spain) Jorge Navarro	Kalex	24	+15.028	6	4
13	35	(Thailand) Somkiat Chantra	Kalex	24	+17.443	16	3
14	52	(Spain) Jeremy Alcoba	Kalex	24	+19.188	23	2
15	7	(Belgium) Barry Baltus	Kalex	24	+19.256	14	1
16	19	(Italy) Lorenzo Dalla Porta	Kalex	24	+19.898	19	
17	42	(Spain) Marcos Ramírez	MV Agusta	24	+28.669	22	
18	84	(Netherlands) Zonta van den Goorbergh	Kalex	24	+28.787	21	
19	4	(United States) Sean Dylan Kelly	Kalex	24	+44.544	24	
20	24	(Italy) Simone Corsi	MV Agusta	24	+44.612	25	
21	81	(Thailand) Keminth Kubo	Kalex	24	+50.836	28	
22	55	(Spain) Álex Toledo	Kalex	24	+51.009	26	
Ret	75	(Spain) Albert Arenas	Kalex	22	Accident	2	
Ret	28	(Italy) Niccolò Antonelli	Kalex	22	Accident	27	
Ret	6	(United States) Cameron Beaubier	Kalex	20	Accident	18	
Ret	61	(Italy) Alessandro Zaccone	Kalex	13	Retired	17	
Ret	23	(Germany) Marcel Schrötter	Kalex	11	Accident	10	
Ret	22	(United Kingdom) Sam Lowes	Kalex	3	Accident	3	
DNS	44	(Spain) Arón Canet	Kalex		Did not start		
Fastest lap: (Italy) Celestino Vietti (Kalex) – 1:36.729 (lap 24)
OFFICIAL MOTO2 RACE REPORT

- Arón Canet withdrew from the event due to effects of a broken nose suffered in a road accident.

=== Moto3 ===
Pos.	No.	Biker	Constructor	Laps	Time/Retired	Grid	Points
1	71	(Japan) Ayumu Sasaki	Husqvarna	22	37:28.371	1	25
2	28	(Spain) Izan Guevara	Gas Gas	22	+0.314	3	20
3	11	(Spain) Sergio García	Gas Gas	22	+0.392	18	16
4	24	(Japan) Tatsuki Suzuki	Honda	22	+0.399	2	13
5	43	(Spain) Xavier Artigas	CFMoto	22	+0.661	9	11
6	96	(Spain) Daniel Holgado	KTM	22	+11.540	12	10
7	82	(Italy) Stefano Nepa	KTM	22	+11.606	14	9
8	6	(Japan) Ryusei Yamanaka	KTM	27	+12.225	13	8
9	53	(Turkey) Deniz Öncü	KTM	22	+12.309	17	7
10	27	(Japan) Kaito Toba	KTM	22	+12.368	20	6
11	54	(Italy) Riccardo Rossi	Honda	22	+12.596	16	5
12	48	(Spain) Iván Ortolá	KTM	22	+12.878	21	4
13	20	(France) Lorenzo Fellon	Honda	22	+12.976	8	3
14	99	(Spain) Carlos Tatay	CFMoto	22	+14.903	23	2
15	16	(Italy) Andrea Migno	Honda	22	+20.915	15	1
16	10	(Brazil) Diogo Moreira	KTM	22	+30.606	19	
17	67	(Italy) Alberto Surra	KTM	22	+37.419	25	
18	64	(Indonesia) Mario Aji	Honda	22	+44.008	27	
19	85	(Italy) Luca Lunetta	KTM	22	+44.132	30	
20	70	(United Kingdom) Joshua Whatley	Honda	22	+44.135	29	
21	72	(Japan) Taiyo Furusato	Honda	22	+44.366	26	
22	22	(Spain) Ana Carrasco	KTM	22	+44.486	28	
Ret	5	(Spain) Jaume Masià	KTM	21	Accident	6	
Ret	44	(Spain) David Muñoz	KTM	21	Accident	4	
Ret	17	(United Kingdom) John McPhee	Husqvarna	21	Accident	11	
Ret	31	(Spain) Adrián Fernández	KTM	21	Accident	7	
Ret	66	(Australia) Joel Kelso	KTM	21	Accident	10	
Ret	7	(Italy) Dennis Foggia	Honda	17	Accident	5	
Ret	19	(United Kingdom) Scott Ogden	Honda	5	Accident	24	
Ret	23	(Italy) Elia Bartolini	KTM	4	Accident	22	
Fastest lap: (United Kingdom) John McPhee (Husqvarna) – 1:41.190 (lap 13)
OFFICIAL MOTO3 RACE REPORT

=== MotoE ===
==== Race 1 ====
Pos.	No.	Biker	Laps	Time/Retired	Grid	Points
1	77	(Switzerland) Dominique Aegerter	8	10:10.913	1	25
2	51	(Brazil) Eric Granado	8	+0.072	2	20
3	27	(Italy) Mattia Casadei	8	+0.081	4	16
4	11	(Italy) Matteo Ferrari	8	+0.507	3	13
5	4	(Spain) Héctor Garzó	8	+0.960	7	11
6	71	(Spain) Miquel Pons	8	+1.224	5	10
7	7	(Italy) Niccolò Canepa	8	+2.810	6	9
8	38	(United Kingdom) Bradley Smith	8	+5.310	8	8
9	40	(Spain) Jordi Torres	8	+5.347	11	7
10	21	(Italy) Kevin Zannoni	8	+9.564	12	6
11	34	(Italy) Kevin Manfredi	8	+9.742	13	5
12	12	(Spain) Xavi Forés	8	+11.392	10	4
13	78	(Japan) Hikari Okubo	8	+12.834	18	3
14	17	(Spain) Álex Escrig	8	+12.917	14	2
15	6	(Spain) María Herrera	8	+13.371	15	1
16	72	(Italy) Alessio Finello	8	+17.992	16	
17^{1}	10	(Spain) Unai Orradre	8	+17.610	17	
Ret	70	(Spain) Marc Alcoba	7	Accident	9	
Fastest lap: (Brazil) Eric Granado – 1:43.086 (lap 4)
OFFICIAL MOTOE RACE NR.1 REPORT

Notes:

- ^1 - Unai Orradre was demoted one position due to exceeding track limits on the final lap.
- All bikes manufactured by Energica.

==== Race 2 ====
Pos.	No.	Biker	Laps	Time/Retired	Grid	Points^{1}
1	51	(Brazil) Eric Granado	3	5:21.094	2	12.5
2	77	(Switzerland) Dominique Aegerter	3	+0.270	1	10
3	27	(Italy) Mattia Casadei	3	+0.556	4	8
4	11	(Italy) Matteo Ferrari	3	+0.646	3	6.5
5	7	(Italy) Niccolò Canepa	3	+2.784	6	5.5
6	17	(Spain) Álex Escrig	3	+2.805	14	5
7	34	(Italy) Kevin Manfredi	3	+3.751	13	4.5
8	6	(Spain) María Herrera	3	+4.143	15	4
9	21	(Italy) Kevin Zannoni	3	+4.216	12	3.5
10	4	(Spain) Héctor Garzó	3	+5.519	7	3
11	78	(Japan) Hikari Okubo	3	+9.943	18	2.5
12	72	(Italy) Alessio Finello	3	+10.094	16	2
13	70	(Spain) Marc Alcoba	2	+1 lap	9	1.5
14	10	(Spain) Unai Orradre	2	+1 lap	17	1
15	16	(Spain) Xavi Forés	2	+1 lap	10	0.5
16	40	(Spain) Jordi Torres	2	+1 lap	11	
17	38	(United Kingdom) Bradley Smith	2	+1 lap	8	
Ret	71	(Spain) Miquel Pons	2	Accident	5	
Fastest lap: (Brazil) Eric Granado – 1:44.926 (lap 2)
OFFICIAL MOTOE RACE NR.2 REPORT

Notes

- ^1 – The race was red-flagged during lap 4 after Miquel Pons' crash. The race was not restarted and results were declared effective after the end of lap 3. Half points were awarded, as less than two thirds of the race distance (but at least three full laps) was completed.
- All bikes manufactured by Energica.

== Championship standings after the race ==
Below are the standings for the top five riders, constructors, and teams after the round.

=== MotoGP ===
Riders' Championship standings

	Pos.	Rider	Points
	1	(France) Fabio Quartararo	172
	2	(Spain) Aleix Espargaró	151
	3	(France) Johann Zarco	114
2	4	(Italy) Francesco Bagnaia	106
1	5	(Italy) Enea Bastianini	105

Constructors' Championship standings

Pos.	Constructor	Points
1	(Italy) Ducati	246
2	(Japan) Yamaha	172
3	(Italy) Aprilia	155
4	(Austria) KTM	121
5	(Japan) Suzuki	101

Teams' Championship standings

	Pos.	Team	Points
1	1	(Italy) Aprilia Racing	213
1	2	(Japan) Monster Energy Yamaha MotoGP	197
1	3	(Italy) Ducati Lenovo Team	197
1	4	(Italy) Prima Pramac Racing	184
	5	(Austria) Red Bull KTM Factory Racing	164

=== Moto2 ===
Riders' Championship standings

	Pos.	Rider	Points
	1	(Italy) Celestino Vietti	146
1	2	(Spain) Augusto Fernández	146
1	3	(Japan) Ai Ogura	145
	4	(Spain) Arón Canet	116
	5	(Italy) Tony Arbolino	104

Constructors' Championship standings

Pos.	Constructor	Points
1	(Germany) Kalex	275
2	(Italy) Boscoscuro	57
3	(Italy) MV Agusta	5

Teams' Championship standings

Pos.	Team	Points
1	(Finland) Red Bull KTM Ajo	221
2	(Japan) Idemitsu Honda Team Asia	214
3	(Spain) Flexbox HP40	178
4	(Belgium) Elf Marc VDS Racing Team	155
5	(Italy) Mooney VR46 Racing Team	146

=== Moto3 ===
Riders' Championship standings

	Pos.	Rider	Points
	1	(Spain) Sergio García	182
	2	(Spain) Izan Guevara	179
	3	(Italy) Dennis Foggia	115
2	4	(Japan) Ayumu Sasaki	113
1	5	(Spain) Jaume Masià	107

Constructors' Championship standings

Pos.	Constructor	Points
1	(Spain) Gas Gas	235
2	(Japan) Honda	181
3	(Austria) KTM	174
4	(Sweden) Husqvarna	133
5	(China) CFMoto	95

Teams' Championship standings

	Pos.	Team	Points
	1	(Spain) GasGas Aspar Team	361
	2	(Luxembourg) Leopard Racing	209
	3	(Finland) Red Bull KTM Ajo	155
1	4	(Italy) Sterilgarda Husqvarna Max	137
1	5	(France) Red Bull KTM Tech3	126

=== MotoE ===
Pos.	Rider	Points
1	(Switzerland) Dominique Aegerter	158
2	(Brazil) Eric Granado	126.5
3	(Italy) Matteo Ferrari	112.5
4	(Italy) Mattia Casadei	98
5	(Spain) Miquel Pons	79

Previous race: 2022 German Grand Prix	FIM Grand Prix World Championship; 2022 season	Next race: 2022 British Grand Prix
Previous race: 2021 Dutch TT	Dutch TT	Next race: 2023 Dutch TT
