= Dennis Foggia =

Italian motorcycle racer

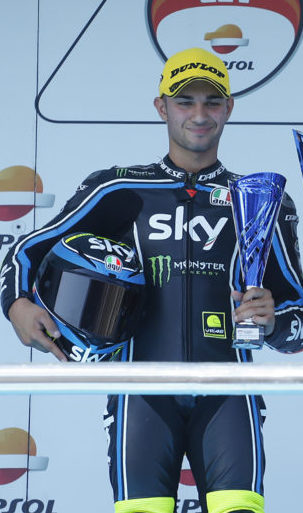
- Foggia in 2017
- Nationality: Italian
- Born: 7 January 2001 (age 25); Rome, Italy
- Current team: CFMoto Aspar Team
- Bike number: 71
Motorcycle racing career statistics
Moto2 World Championship
Active years	2023–2024, 2026
Manufacturers	Kalex, Boscoscuro
2024 championship position	25th (18 pts)
Starts / Wins / Podiums / Poles / F. laps / Points; 41 / 0 / 0 / 0 / 0 / 53
Moto3 World Championship
Active years	2017–2022, 2025
Manufacturers	KTM (2017–2019); Honda (2020–2022); CFMoto (2025)
Championships	0
2025 championship position	14th (96 pts)
Starts / Wins / Podiums / Poles / F. laps / Points; 112 / 10 / 24 / 4 / 4 / 816

Dennis Foggia (born 7 January 2001) is an Italian motorcycle rider who currently competes in the 2026 Moto2 European Championship for Team Ciatti - Boscoscuro. He previously raced in Moto3 between 2017 and 2022, becoming the 2021 runner-up as well as finishing third in 2022. He then competed in Moto2 for two years, riding for Italtrans Racing Team, before a short return to the lightweight class in 2025, riding for CFMoto Aspar Team.

== Career ==
=== Early career ===
Foggia made his debut in motorcycle racing at the age of 15, during the 2016 FIM CEV Moto3 Junior World Championship, riding for the VR46 Riders Academy team, along with Celestino Vietti. In his first ever race, the opening round at Valencia, he finished in second place, and was a regular points scorer throughout the year, finishing seventh in the standings with 79 points, and grabbing a third place podium in the final race of the season, also at Valencia.

For the 2017 season, Foggia stayed with the VR46 Academy team, and dominated the season. Out of the 12 races held that year, Foggia won four races, had nine podiums, and won the championship by 79 points.

=== Moto3 World Championship ===
==== Sky Racing Team VR46 (2016–2019) ====
Foggia's good results in the juniors also earned him three wild-card race appearances in the 2017 Moto3 World Championship, where he finished 14th, eighth and seventh, scoring solid points.

As expected, after his 2017 junior championship and good results in the three wild-card races, Foggia was signed full-time by the VR46 Racing Team to partner Nicolò Bulega for the 2018 Moto3 World Championship. Foggia struggled initially, but improved as the season went on, scoring a third place in Aragón, finishing with 55 points, which was only enough for 19th in the standings, but was second best among the rookies.

Staying with the Sky Racing Team VR46 for the 2019 season, Foggia basically replicated last season, scoring one podium again, a third place finish in Aragón. His rookie teammate Celestino Vietti had three podiums, and finished as rookie of the year, scoring 135 points, compared to Foggia's 97. Following the season, through mutual consent between team and rider, Foggia left the VR46 Academy after spending four seasons together.

==== Leopard Racing (2020–2022) ====
For the 2020 season, Foggia moved to Leopard Racing Honda, signing a three-year contract, partnering Jaume Masiá. In a shortened season due to the pandemic, Foggia scored three podiums, winning the race in Brno. He finished with 89 points, tenth in the standings, but Leopard managed to win the team championship.

Staying with Leopard Racing for his fourth full season in Moto3, for 2021 Foggia was partnered by Xavier Artigas, as Masiá left to join the Red Bull KTM Ajo Team. This would be Foggia's breakout year, as he won five races, scoringten podiums total, and was contending for the title until the penultimate round, with rookie Pedro Acosta, Masiá's teammate. After an incident with Darryn Binder in the last lap of the Algarve Grand Prix, Foggia could no longer win the title, finishing the year in second place with 216 points.

There were rumours of Foggia leaving Leopard Racing, especially after the Styrian Grand Prix, when his father was locked out of the paddock, with the team reportedly doing so as they believed he was being a bad influence on Foggia, but in the end decided to stay for the 2022 season and honor his contract; despite his earlier comments after the race stating that he wishes to leave. Staying in Moto3 with Leopard Racing, he would be partnered by Tatsuki Suzuki.

=== Moto2 World Championship ===
==== Italtrans Racing Team (from 2023 to 2024) ====
From 2023, Foggia graduated to Moto2 World Championship with Italtrans Racing Team. Foggia’s best result in the intermediate class was sixth achieved in 2024 at the Circuit of the Americas. At the end of the year, Aspar Team announced that Foggia would race for the team not in Moto2 but in Moto3.

== Career statistics ==
=== FIM CEV Moto3 Junior World Championship ===
==== Races by year ====
(key) (Races in bold indicate pole position, races in italics indicate fastest lap)

Year	Bike	1	2	3	4	5	6	7	8	9	10	11	12	Pos	Pts
2016	KTM	VAL1; 2	VAL2; Ret	LMS; 5	ARA; 7	CAT1; 9	CAT2; 13	ALB; Ret	ALG; Ret	JER1; 4	JER2; 16	VAL1; Ret	VAL2; 3	7th	79
2017	KTM	ALB; 4	LMS; 2	CAT1; 8	CAT2; 2	VAL1; 1	VAL2; 1	EST; 1	JER1; 2	JER1; Ret	**ARA**; 2	VAL1; 2	VAL2; 1	1st	221

=== FIM Moto2 European Championship ===
==== Races by year ====
(key) (Races in bold indicate pole position; races in italics indicate fastest lap)

Year	Bike	1	2	3	4	5	6	7	8	9	10	11	Pos	Pts
2026	Boscoscuro	CAT1; 6	CAT2; 1	EST1; 6	EST2; 3	JER; 15	MAG1; 7	MAG2; 9	VAL; 5	ARA1; 8	ARA2; 9	MIS; 10	5th	110

=== Grand Prix motorcycle racing ===
==== By season ====
Season	Class	Motorcycle	Team	Race	Win	Podium	Pole	FLap	Pts	Plcd
2017	Moto3	KTM	Platinum Bay Real Estate	1	0	0	0	0	19	24th
2017	Moto3	KTM	Sky Junior Team VR46 Academy	2	0	0	0	0	19	24th
2018	Moto3	KTM	Sky Racing Team VR46	18	0	1	0	1	55	19th
2019	Moto3	KTM	Sky Racing Team VR46	18	0	1	0	1	97	12th
2020	Moto3	Honda	Leopard Racing	15	1	3	0	0	89	10th
2021	Moto3	Honda	Leopard Racing	18	5	10	0	0	216	**2nd**
2022	Moto3	Honda	Leopard Racing	20	4	8	4	2	246	**3rd**
2023	Moto2	Kalex	Italtrans Racing Team	20	0	0	0	0	35	19th
2024	Moto2	Kalex	Italtrans Racing Team	19	0	0	0	0	18	25th
2025	Moto3	KTM	CFMoto Aspar Team	20	0	1	0	0	96	14th
2026	Moto2	Boscoscuro	SpeedRS Team	2	0	0	0	0	0*	32nd*
Total				**153**	**10**	**24**	**4**	**4**	**871**	

==== By class ====
Class	Seasons	1st GP	1st pod	1st win	Race	Win	Podiums	Pole	FLap	Pts	WChmp
Moto3	2017–2022, 2025	2017 Czech Republic	2018 Thailand	2020 Czech Republic	112	10	24	4	4	818	0
Moto2	2023–2024, 2026	2023 Portugal			41	0	0	0	0	53	0
Total	2017–present				**153**	**10**	**24**	**4**	**4**	**871**	**0**

==== Races by year ====
(key) (Races in bold indicate pole position, races in italics indicate fastest lap)

Year	Class	Bike	1	2	3	4	5	6	7	8	9	10	11	12	13	14	15	16	17	18	19	20	21	22	Pos	Pts
2017	Moto3	KTM	QAT	ARG	AME	SPA	FRA	ITA	CAT	NED	GER	CZE; 14	AUT	GBR	RSM	ARA; 8	JPN	AUS	MAL	VAL; 7					24th	19
2018	Moto3	KTM	QAT; 16	ARG; Ret	AME; 16	SPA; Ret	FRA; 14	ITA; Ret	CAT; 9	NED; 12	GER; 19	CZE; 12	AUT; 26	GBR; C	RSM; 7	ARA; 25	THA; 3	JPN; 4	AUS; Ret	MAL; Ret	VAL; Ret				19th	55
2019	Moto3	KTM	QAT; Ret	ARG; 8	AME; 10	SPA; 16	FRA; Ret	ITA; 5	CAT; 5	NED; 9	GER; Ret	CZE; 15	AUT; 14	GBR; 8	RSM; 5	ARA; 3	THA; 5	JPN; 23	AUS; 11	MAL; 19	VAL; DNS				12th	97
2020	Moto3	Honda	QAT; 9	SPA; Ret	ANC; Ret	CZE; 1	AUT; 21	STY; 11	RSM; 9	EMI; Ret	CAT; 3	FRA; 13	ARA; 10	TER; 16	EUR; Ret	VAL; 16	POR; 2								10th	89
2021	Moto3	Honda	QAT; Ret	DOH; 17	POR; 2	SPA; Ret	FRA; 18	ITA; 1	CAT; Ret	GER; 3	NED; 1	STY; 22	AUT; 3	GBR; 3	ARA; 1	RSM; 1	AME; 2	EMI; 1	ALR; Ret	VAL; 13					2nd	216
2022	Moto3	Honda	QAT; 7	INA; 1	ARG; 2	AME; 2	POR; 8	SPA; 18	**FRA**; 4	ITA; Ret	**CAT**; Ret	GER; 2	NED; Ret	GBR; 1	AUT; 12	RSM; 1	ARA; 14	JPN; 2	**THA**; 1	AUS; 9	**MAL**; 6	VAL; 4			3rd	246
2023	Moto2	Kalex	POR; 18	ARG; 25	AME; 14	SPA; 18	FRA; 14	ITA; 13	GER; 15	NED; 19	GBR; Ret	AUT; 11	CAT; 21	RSM; Ret	IND; 11	JPN; Ret	INA; 11	AUS; 17	THA; 12	MAL; 15	QAT; 17	VAL; 9			19th	35
2024	Moto2	Kalex	QAT; 19	POR; 17	AME; 6	SPA; Ret	FRA; 19	CAT; Ret	ITA; 20	NED; 12	GER; 16	GBR; 19	AUT; Ret	CAT; Ret	RSM; 22	EMI; 12	INA	JPN; 26	AUS; Ret	THA; 18	MAL; 19	SLD; 24			25th	18
2025	Moto3	KTM	THA; 6	ARG; 11	AME; 7	QAT; Ret	SPA; 13	FRA; 11	GBR; Ret	ARA; 15	ITA; 3	NED; 8	GER; 11	CZE; 5	AUT; 13	HUN; 11	CAT; 19	RSM; 13	JPN; 10	INA; 12	AUS	MAL	POR; 14	VAL; 21	14th	96
2026	Moto2	Boscoscuro	THA	BRA; 23	USA; 19	SPA	FRA	CAT	ITA	HUN	CZE	NED	GER	GBR	ARA	RSM	AUT	JPN	INA	AUS	MAL	QAT	POR	VAL	32nd*	0*

* Season still in progress.
