= Joe Roberts (motorcyclist) =

American motorcycle racer (born 1997)

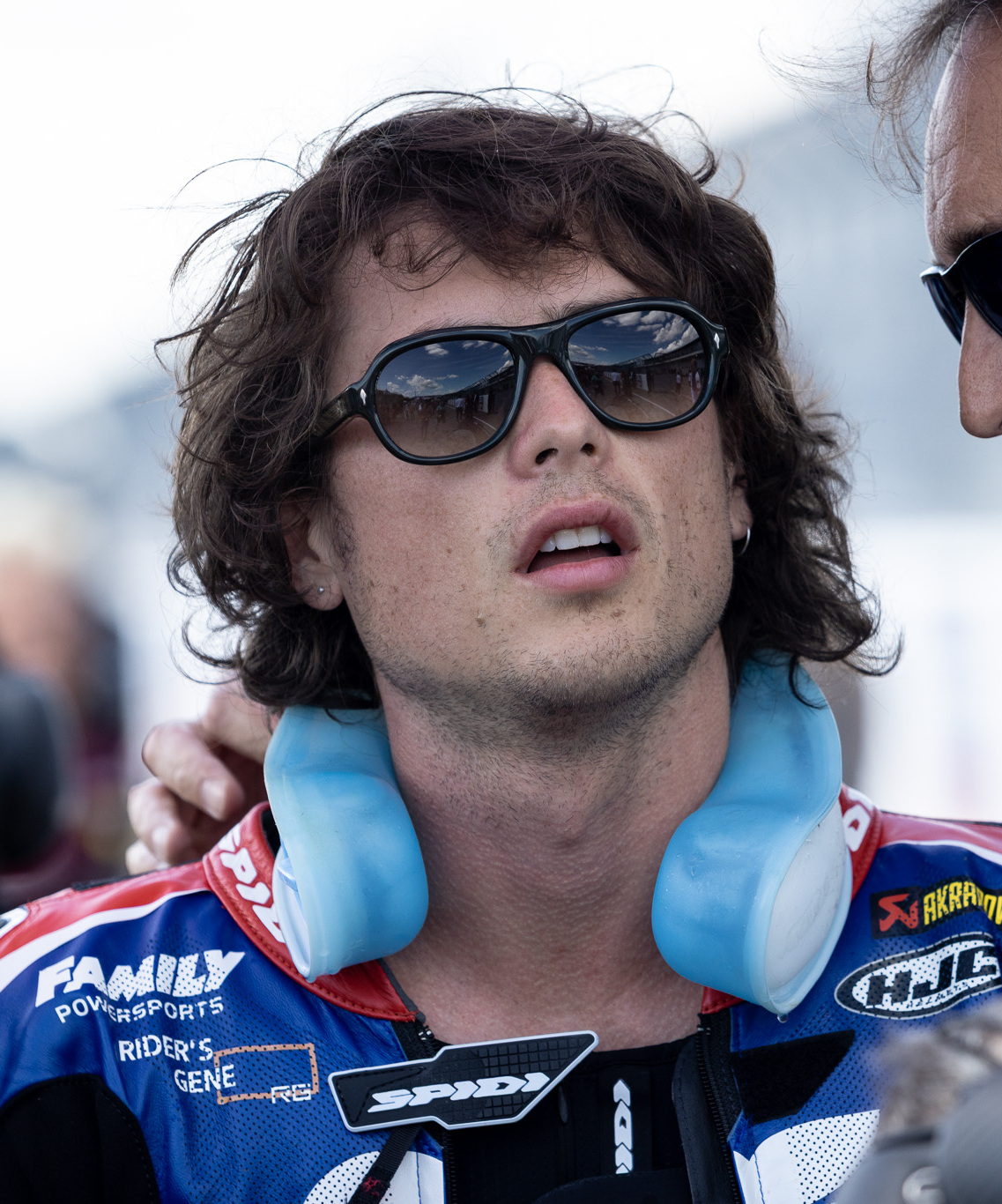
- Roberts at the 2026 German Grand Prix
- Nationality: American
- Born: June 16, 1997 (age 29); Malibu, California, U.S.
- Current team: OnlyFans American Racing Team
- Bike number: 16
Motorcycle racing career statistics
Moto2 World Championship
Active years	2017–
Manufacturers	Kalex (2017, 2020–); NTS (2018); KTM (2019)
2025 championship position	14th (97 pts)
Starts / Wins / Podiums / Poles / F. laps / Points; 165 / 3 / 9 / 5 / 3 / 689.5

Joe Roberts (born June 16, 1997) is an American professional motorcycle racer. Roberts competes in the FIM Moto2 World Championship with OnlyFans American Racing Team aboard a Kalex chassis bike.

== Career ==
=== Early career ===
Roberts' introduction to motorcycles was at a young age. He first rode a 50 cc motorcycle just shy of his fourth birthday. Roberts's earliest competition was in youth flat track and Supermoto. From there he transitioned to mini-road racing on kart tracks and then to full sized tracks on a Honda RS125. He competed successfully for two seasons in the USGPRU (United States Grand Prix Racer's Union) finishing third in points in 125GP in 2010. At the end of 2010, he was invited to the Red Bull MotoGP Rookies Cup try-outs for the 2011 season and was one of 12 selected from 100 applicants.

Roberts spent three seasons (2011–2013) with the Red Bull Rookies. In his first season, he recorded a win and a track record at Brno, a track he had never seen before. He improved his results in 2012 with best finishes of second, fourth, fifth and was one of very few riders to be invited back for a third year in 2013 to ride the new KTM Moto3 bike. Roberts showed good promise on the 4 stroke machine leading races in Jerez, Brno and Silverstone but some bad luck saw him fail to finish a number of races which lowered his final standing. That same year, just six days after his 16th birthday, he competed back in the US in the AMA aboard a Honda CBR600RR, recording a sensational double win at Barber Motorsports, setting a record for the youngest win in AMA Pro Road racing. He won again at Laguna Seca and scored another double win at Miller Motorsports Park, thereby scoring five wins from the five AMA races he entered.

In 2014, Roberts returned full-time to the US to ride for Team Hammer in AMA Daytona Sportbike on a Honda CBR600RR. However, the combination of an uncompetitive package and some injuries meant he wasn't able to continue his run of success from 2013. For 2015, Roberts returned to his winning ways aboard a Yamaha R6 in the new AMA/FIM MotoAmerica Stock600 class with nine wins and a second from 11 starts, sealing the championship at Laguna Seca, before the final round of the series at New Jersey, where he moved up to the Supersport class. There, he dominated practice and qualifying, had a runaway victory in Race 1 and finished a close second in Race 2. He finished third in Superprestigio in Las Vegas at the end of the year. 2016 saw him compete in AMA/MotoAmerica Supersport on a Yamaha R6 where he climbed the podium three times and scored three pole positions. He was unfortunately forced to miss several races due to injury.

=== Moto2 World Championship ===
==== AGR Team (2017) ====
===== 2017 =====
In 2017, Roberts returned to Europe to compete in the FIM CEV Moto2 class with the AGRteam. Mid-year due to his strong performance on the Kalex machine, he was invited by AGR to join the World Championship Moto2 team and made a sensational debut in Brno coming from 29th on the grid to finish tenth in his first race at the world level.

==== NTS RW Racing GP (2018) ====
===== 2018 =====
In 2018, Roberts competed in Moto2 riding for NTS Racing GP.

==== American Racing (2019–2020) ====
===== 2019 =====
From 2019 season, Roberts rode for American Racing.

===== 2020 =====
In 2020, Roberts qualified on pole position at the opening round of the season, becoming the first American rider to do so since Ben Spies at the 2010 Indianapolis motorcycle Grand Prix and the first one in Moto2 since Kenny Noyes at the 2010 French motorcycle Grand Prix. He finished the race in fourth, after never having finished better than 13th over the previous two seasons. He would qualify for pole again in the fourth round and finished the race in third, becoming the first American rider on the podium since Spies at the 2011 Valencian Community motorcycle Grand Prix and the first in mid class since John Kocinski at the 1993 Dutch TT. A documentary was made by Dorna following Roberts and American Racing titled Behind The Stars And Stripes.

After the 2020 season, Roberts was seen as a hot commodity in the Grand Prix World Championship. Roberts was offered not only deals with multiple front running teams on the Moto2 grid but was even offered a MotoGP ride with Aprilia to partner Aleix Espargaro in 2021, a move that was endorsed not only by Roberts manager and American Racing team principal Eitan Butbul but also his mentor John Hopkins and was even endorsed by Espargaro himself.

==== Italtrans Racing Team (2021–2023) ====
===== 2021 =====
Roberts ultimately declined the offer to move up to MotoGP for Aprilia upon consulting with Ducati rider Andrea Dovizioso and instead chose to race for Italtrans Racing Team, whom Moto2 series champion Enea Bastianini raced for before moving up to MotoGP himself.

Italtrans Racing announced on September 27, 2021, that they had resigned Roberts for another season. Roberts suffered a broken collarbone at Misano on October 22, 2021, and underwent surgery the following Tuesday, forcing him to miss the last two rounds of the 2021 season.

==== Return to American Racing (2024) ====
American Racing Team announced a deal with Roberts for the 2024 Moto2 season. The Malibu rider returned to the team that led him to make his debut in the world championship, now with content subscription service OnlyFans as a big sponsor.

== Career statistics ==
=== Red Bull MotoGP Rookies Cup ===
==== Races by year ====
(key) (Races in bold indicate pole position, races in italics indicate fastest lap)

Year	1	2	3	4	5	6	7	8	9	10	11	12	13	14	15	Pos	Pts
2011	SPA1; 12	SPA2; 9	POR1; 11	POR2; 5	GBR1; 16	GBR2; 14	NED1; 13	NED2; 15	ITA; 16	GER1; 17	GER2; Ret	CZE1; 1	CZE2; 12	RSM; 13		12th	65
2012	SPA1; 7	SPA2; Ret	POR1; 9	POR2; 5	GBR1; 11	GBR2; 12	NED1; 4	NED2; 12	GER1; 13	GER2; 11	CZE1; 11	CZE2; 2	RSM; 12	ARA1; 8	ARA2; 13	9th	101
2013	AME1; NC	AME2; Ret	JER1; 7	JER2; 10	ASS1; 5	ASS2; 9	SAC1; Ret	SAC2; 11	BRN; 4	SIL1; Ret	SIL2; Ret	MIS; 7	ARA1; Ret	ARA2; Ret		14th	60

=== FIM CEV Moto2 European Championship ===
==== Races by year ====
(key) (Races in bold indicate pole position, races in italics indicate fastest lap)

Year	Bike	1	2	3	4	5	6	7	8	9	10	11	Pos	Pts
2017	Kalex	ALB; 8	CAT1; 6	CAT2; 2	VAL1; Ret	VAL2; 4	EST1; 11	EST2; 3	JER; 6	ARA1; 4	ARA2; Ret	VAL; 3	5th	111

=== MotoAmerica Superbike Championship ===
==== By season ====
Season	Class	Motorcycle	Race	Win	Podium	Pts	Plcd
2015	Stock600	Yamaha	11	9	11	N/A	**1st**
2016	SSP	Yamaha	N/A	N/A	N/A	142	6th

=== Grand Prix motorcycle racing ===
==== By season ====
Season	Class	Motorcycle	Team	Race	Win	Podium	Pole	FLap	Pts	Plcd
2017	Moto2	Kalex	AGR Team	5	0	0	0	0	6	30th
2018	Moto2	NTS	NTS RW Racing GP	18	0	0	0	0	5	27th
2019	Moto2	KTM	American Racing	18	0	0	0	0	4	28th
2020	Moto2	Kalex	American Racing	15	0	1	3	0	94	7th
2021	Moto2	Kalex	Italtrans Racing Team	16	0	0	0	0	59	13th
2022	Moto2	Kalex	Italtrans Racing Team	20	1	2	0	1	131	9th
2023	Moto2	Kalex	Italtrans Racing Team	20	0	1	1	0	93.5	13th
2024	Moto2	Kalex	OnlyFans American Racing Team	15	1	4	1	1	153	9th
2025	Moto2	Kalex	OnlyFans American Racing Team	20	1	1	0	1	97	14th
2026	Moto2	Kalex	OnlyFans American Racing Team	18	0	0	0	0	47*	18th*
Total				**165**	**3**	**9**	**5**	**3**	**689.5**	

==== By class ====
Class	Seasons	1st GP	1st pod	1st win	Race	Win	Podiums	Pole	FLap	Pts	WChmp
Moto2	2017–present	2017 Czech Republic	2020 Czech Republic	2022 Portugal	165	3	9	5	3	689.5	0
Total	2017–present				**165**	**3**	**9**	**5**	**3**	**689.5**	**0**

==== Races by year ====
(key) (Races in bold indicate pole position; races in italics indicate fastest lap)

Year	Class	Bike	1	2	3	4	5	6	7	8	9	10	11	12	13	14	15	16	17	18	19	20	21	22	Pos	Pts
2017	Moto2	Kalex	QAT	ARG	AME	SPA	FRA	ITA	CAT	NED	GER	CZE; 10	AUT; 19	GBR; 21	RSM; Ret	ARA; 26	JPN	AUS	MAL	VAL					30th	6
2018	Moto2	NTS	QAT; 25	ARG; 25	AME; 23	SPA; Ret	FRA; 19	ITA; 14	CAT; 22	NED; 21	GER; 22	CZE; 18	AUT; 19	GBR; C	RSM; 16	ARA; 24	THA; 13	JPN; 18	AUS; 18	MAL; 18	VAL; Ret				27th	5
2019	Moto2	KTM	QAT; 22	ARG; 22	AME; Ret	SPA; 20	FRA; 14	ITA; Ret	CAT; 20	NED; 14	GER; 25	CZE; DNS	AUT; 21	GBR; 22	RSM; 16	ARA; 30	THA; Ret	JPN; 18	AUS; 16	MAL; 19	VAL; 18				28th	4
2020	Moto2	Kalex	**QAT**; 4	SPA; 17	ANC; 17	**CZE**; 3	AUT; 10	STY; 12	RSM; 10	EMI; Ret	CAT; 5	**FRA**; 6	ARA; 8	TER; 10	EUR; Ret	VAL; 11	POR; 7								7th	94
2021	Moto2	Kalex	QAT; 6	DOH; Ret	POR; 4	SPA; 8	FRA; Ret	ITA; 4	CAT; 10	GER; Ret	NED; Ret	STY; Ret	AUT; 16	GBR; 10	ARA; 13	RSM; 23	AME; 18	EMI; DNS	ALR; 24	VAL; DNS					13th	59
2022	Moto2	Kalex	QAT; 8	INA; 11	ARG; 13	AME; 8	POR; 1	SPA; 8	FRA; 7	ITA; 2	CAT; Ret	GER; 13	NED; 8	GBR; 7	AUT; 14	RSM; 9	ARA; 9	JPN; 12	THA; 8^{‡}	AUS; Ret	MAL; Ret	VAL; 15			9th	131
2023	Moto2	Kalex	POR; 14	ARG; 14	AME; 16	SPA; 14	FRA; 12	ITA; 12	GER; Ret	NED; 18	GBR; 4	AUT; Ret	CAT; 11	RSM; 8	IND; 3	JPN; 12	INA; 9	AUS; 5^{‡}	THA; Ret	MAL; 8	**QAT**; 11	VAL; 8			13th	93.5
2024	Moto2	Kalex	QAT; 7	POR; 2	AME; 2	SPA; 2	FRA; 4	CAT; 8	**ITA**; 1	NED; DNS	GER; 8	GBR; Ret	AUT; 9	ARA; Ret	RSM; 13	EMI; 6	INA; 6	JPN; 27	AUS; DNS	THA	MAL	SLD			9th	153
2025	Moto2	Kalex	THA; 18	ARG; 16	AME; 25	QAT; 15	SPA; 11	FRA; 12	GBR; 8	ARA; 7	ITA; 9	NED; 5	GER; 6	CZE; 1	AUT; Ret	HUN; 19	CAT; 12	RSM; 20	JPN; Ret	INA; 6	AUS; 13	MAL; Ret	POR	VAL	14th	97
2026	Moto2	Kalex	THA; Ret	BRA; 18	USA; 9	SPA; 15	FRA; 8	CAT; Ret	ITA; 14	HUN; 15	CZE; 8	NED; 15	GER; 12	GBR; 12	ARA; 12	RSM; 13	AUT; 15	JPN; 20	INA; DNS	AUS; C	MAL; 18	QAT; 13	POR	VAL	18th*	47*

^{‡} Half points awarded as less than two thirds (2022 Thailand GP)/less than half (2023 Australian GP) of the race distance (but at least three full laps) was completed.
* Season still in progress.
