= Tony Arbolino =

Italian motorcycle racer (born 2000)

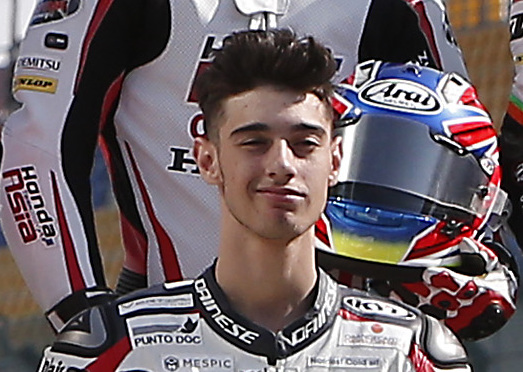
- Arbolino in 2019
- Nationality: Italian
- Born: 3 August 2000 (age 26); Garbagnate Milanese, Italy
- Current team: Reds Fantic Racing
- Bike number: 14
Motorcycle racing career statistics
Moto2 World Championship
Active years	2021–
Manufacturers	Kalex (2021–2024, 2026); Boscoscuro (2025)
2025 championship position	19th (76 pts)
Starts / Wins / Podiums / Poles / F. laps / Points; 119 / 6 / 18 / 1 / 5 / 799.5
Moto3 World Championship
Active years	2017–2020
Manufacturers	Honda
Championships	0
2020 championship position	2nd (170 pts)
Starts / Wins / Podiums / Poles / F. laps / Points; 69 / 3 / 12 / 6 / 1 / 404

Tony Arbolino (born 3 August 2000) is an Italian Grand Prix motorcycle racer competing in the 2026 Moto2 World Championship for Fantic Racing Lino Sonego aboard a Kalex.

Arbolino won the Italian 125 PreGP Championship in both 2013 and 2014.

Arbolino is a vice-champion in both Moto3 and Moto2, having achieved this feat in 2020 and 2023 respectively. Nicknamed Lo squalo di Garbagnate, he is known for his ability of running very fast on wet circuits.

== Career ==
=== Moto3 World Championship ===
==== Sic58 Squadra Corse (2017) ====
Arbolino was signed up to race in the Moto3 World Championship for the SIC58 Squadra Corse team for 2017. He scored two points in the whole season, ending up 34th in the standings.

==== Snipers Team (2018–2020) ====
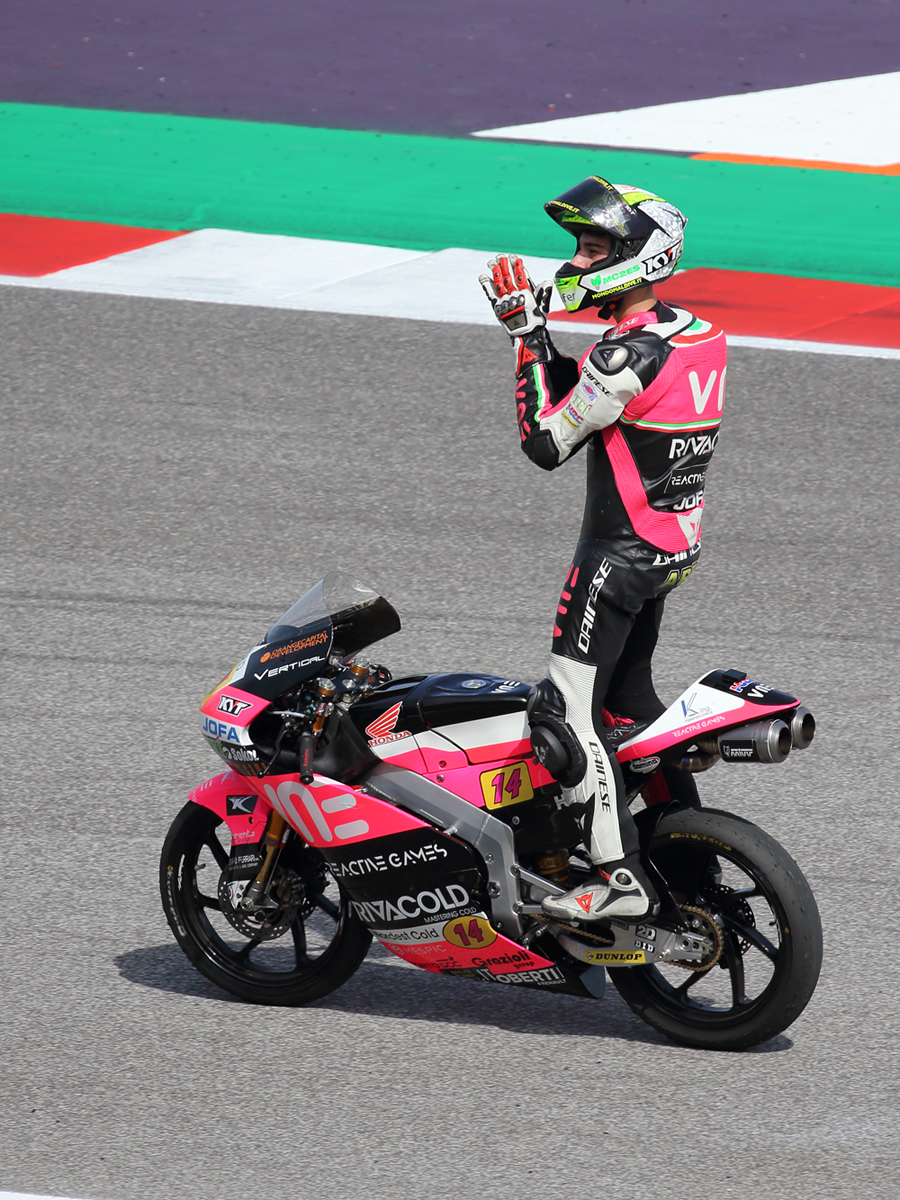
Arbolino at the 2019 San Marino Grand Prix

A year later, Arbolino raced for the Marinelli Snipers Team, scoring his first pole position at the second race of the season, at the Termas de Rio Hondo. He scored points in many occasions, including another pole position at Valencia. He finished 18th in the standings.

Arbolino continued another year with VNE Snipers Team, scoring his first podium in Argentina. He then made his first career win in Mugello, and also his second later in Assen. He finished on the podium on many other times, ending fourth in the standings. In 2020, Arbolino secured the second place in the 2020 Moto3 World Championship with several podiums to his name and a victory in the penultimate round in Valencia at the 2020 Valencian Community motorcycle Grand Prix.

=== Moto2 World Championship ===
==== Liqui Moly Intact GP (2021) ====
In 2021, Arbolino made the switch to the Moto2 class with Liqui Moly Intact GP. His season was slightly inconsistent, achieving four top ten finishes throughout the year with a personal best of fourth achieved at the 2021 French motorcycle Grand Prix, finishing 14th in the standings. For 2022, Arbolino moved to Elf Marc VDS Racing Team with hopes for even better results than in 2021.

==== Elf Marc VDS Racing Team (2022–2024) ====
Arbolino started the year in great shape with debut front row achieved at the 2022 Qatar motorcycle Grand Prix, just to take his debut victory in the intermediate class at the 2022 Motorcycle Grand Prix of the Americas. Arbolino scored three wins and five podiums throughout the year, the Italian finished the year sitting fourth in the standings. Arbolino stayed with MarcVDS for the 2023 season. Leading the championship before the summer break, Arbolino had a chance to become the World Champion, scoring eight podiums and winning three races was not enough to stop Pedro Acosta. He finished second in the standings and he was the favourite to win the championship next season. The reality of challenging for the title straight away was far from what happened. Arbolino was far from his best in the first part of the season, as he struggled to finish in top-ten. A breakthrough podium in Aragón and a maiden Moto2 Pole Position in Misano where the highlights of Arbolino's 2024 season. Elf Marc VDS Racing Team announced that Jake Dixon and Filip Salač would ride for the team in the 2025 Moto2 World Championship.

==== Pramac Yamaha Moto2 (2025) ====
After three years in MarcVDS colours, Arbolino joined Pramac Racing's Moto2 project. His teammate was Izan Guevara. The Italian started the season in good style, by achieving a podium at the 2025 Motorcycle Grand Prix of the Americas when he finished second. But that’s all of Arbolino’s success throughout the season, as he struggled to adapt to the new Boscoscuro machine. He ended the year in 18th place, his worst since the switch from Moto3 to Moto2.

==== Fantic Racing (2026) ====
Arbolino decided to change his team for the upcoming season, joining the 2025 Teams Champions Fantic Motor Moto2 Team on Kalex machinery, hoping to finally be back in his best shape.

==== Klint Racing (2027) ====
Arbolino will switch to the Klint Forward Factory Team for 2027 alongside Adrián Huertas.

== Career statistics ==
=== Career highlights ===
- 2013: 1st, Italian 125 PreGP Championship
- 2014: 1st, Italian 125 PreGP Championship

=== FIM CEV Moto3 Junior World Championship ===
==== Races by year ====
(key) (Races in bold indicate pole position; races in italics indicate fastest lap)

Year	Bike	1	2	3	4	5	6	7	8	9	10	11	12	Pos	Pts
2014	KTM	JER1	JER2	LMS	ARA	CAT1	CAT2	ALB	NAV	ALG	VAL1; 16	VAL1; Ret		NC	0
2015	KTM	ALG; 21	LMS; DNS	CAT1; Ret	CAT2; 22	ARA1; Ret	ARA2; 12	ALB; 11	NAV; 7	JER1; 16	JER2; 5	VAL1; Ret	VAL2; 4	12th	42
2016	Honda	VAL1; Ret	VAL2; 15	LMS; 14	ARA; 6	CAT1; Ret	CAT2; 2	ALB; 10	ALG; 5	JER1; 17	JER2; 1	VAL1; Ret	VAL2; DNS	9th	75

=== Grand Prix motorcycle racing ===
==== By season ====
Season	Class	Motorcycle	Team	Race	Win	Podium	Pole	FLap	Pts	Plcd
2017	Moto3	Honda	Sic58 Squadra Corse	18	0	0	0	0	2	34th
2018	Moto3	Honda	Marinelli Snipers Team	18	0	0	2	1	57	18th
2019	Moto3	Honda	VNE Snipers	19	2	7	3	0	175	4th
2020	Moto3	Honda	Rivacold Snipers Team	14	1	5	1	0	170	**2nd**
2021	Moto2	Kalex	Liqui Moly Intact GP	18	0	0	0	0	51	14th
2022	Moto2	Kalex	Elf Marc VDS Racing Team	20	3	5	0	2	191.5	4th
2023	Moto2	Kalex	Elf Marc VDS Racing Team	20	3	8	0	1	249.5	**2nd**
2024	Moto2	Kalex	Elf Marc VDS Racing Team	20	0	3	1	1	149	10th
2025	Moto2	Boscoscuro	Blu Cru Pramac Yamaha Moto2	22	0	1	0	0	76	19th
2026	Moto2	Kalex	Reds Fantic Racing	19	0	1	0	1	82.5*	13th*
Total				**188**	**9**	**30**	**7**	**6**	**1203.5**	

==== By class ====
Class	Seasons	1st GP	1st pod	1st win	Race	Win	Podiums	Pole	FLap	Pts	WChmp
Moto3	2017–2020	2017 Qatar	2019 Argentina	2019 Italy	69	3	12	6	1	404	0
Moto2	2021–present	2021 Qatar	2022 Americas	2022 Americas	119	6	18	1	5	799.5	0
Total	2017–present				**188**	**9**	**30**	**7**	**6**	**1203.5**	**0**

==== Races by year ====
(key) (Races in bold indicate pole position; races in italics indicate fastest lap)

Year	Class	Bike	1	2	3	4	5	6	7	8	9	10	11	12	13	14	15	16	17	18	19	20	21	22	Pos	Pts
2017	Moto3	Honda	QAT; 24	ARG; 14	AME; 20	SPA; 23	FRA; 22	ITA; 21	CAT; 24	NED; Ret	GER; Ret	CZE; 16	AUT; 17	GBR; 25	RSM; Ret	ARA; 26	JPN; 23	AUS; 18	MAL; 22	VAL; 25					34th	2
2018	Moto3	Honda	QAT; 17	**ARG**; 10	AME; 20	SPA; Ret	FRA; 7	ITA; 7	CAT; Ret	NED; 17	GER; 17	CZE; 15	AUT; 9	GBR; C	RSM; 11	ARA; 16	THA; 14	JPN; 6	AUS; Ret	MAL; 8	**VAL**; Ret				18th	57
2019	Moto3	Honda	QAT; 16	ARG; 3	AME; 6	SPA; 17	FRA; Ret	**ITA**; 1	CAT; Ret	NED; 1	GER; 15	**CZE**; 3	AUT; 2	**GBR**; 2	RSM; 3	ARA; 10	THA; 10	JPN; Ret	AUS; 9	MAL; 9	VAL; Ret				4th	175
2020	Moto3	Honda	QAT; 15	SPA; 3	ANC; 10	CZE; 8	AUT; 7	STY; 2	RSM; 6	EMI; 11	**CAT**; 2	FRA; 2	ARA	TER; 10	EUR; 4	VAL; 1	POR; 5								2nd	170
2021	Moto2	Kalex	QAT; 16	DOH; 11	POR; 16	SPA; 21	FRA; 4	ITA; 7	CAT; 13	GER; 16	NED; Ret	STY; 17	AUT; 13	GBR; 18	ARA; 9	RSM; 15	AME; 6	EMI; Ret	ALR; 20	VAL; 23					14th	51
2022	Moto2	Kalex	QAT; 5	INA; 8	ARG; 6	AME; 1	POR; Ret	SPA; 3	FRA; Ret	ITA; 4	CAT; 10	GER; 10	NED; 7	GBR; 12	AUT; Ret	RSM; 7	ARA; 5	JPN; 6	THA; 1^{‡}	AUS; Ret	MAL; 1	VAL; 3			4th	191.5
2023	Moto2	Kalex	POR; 3	ARG; 1	AME; 2	SPA; 4	FRA; 1	ITA; 2	GER; 2	NED; 7	GBR; 10	AUT; 6	CAT; 17	RSM; 4	IND; 2	JPN; 11	INA; 6	AUS; 1^{‡}	THA; 4	MAL; 10	QAT; 10	VAL; 16			2nd	249.5
2024	Moto2	Kalex	QAT; 20	POR; 12	AME; 11	SPA; 7	FRA; 8	CAT; 9	ITA; 16	NED; 6	GER; 9	GBR; Ret	AUT; 5	ARA; 2	**RSM**; 3	EMI; 3	INA; 7	JPN; 11	AUS; 8	THA; Ret	MAL; 5	SLD; 13			10th	149
2025	Moto2	Boscoscuro	THA; 13	ARG; 11	AME; 2	QAT; 20	SPA; 15	FRA; Ret	GBR; 14	ARA; 17	ITA; 18	NED; 13	GER; Ret	CZE; 19	AUT; 5	HUN; 15	CAT; 20	RSM; 9	JPN; 6	INA; 16	AUS; 17	MAL; 10	POR; 17	VAL; 9	19th	76
2026	Moto2	Kalex	THA; 13^{‡}	BRA; 7	USA; 10	SPA; 8	FRA; 14	CAT; 17	ITA; 11	HUN; 10	CZE; 19	NED; 11	GER; 16	GBR; Ret	ARA; 16	RSM; 5	AUT; 14	JPN; 2	INA; 9	AUS; C	MAL; 16	QAT; 18	POR	VAL	13th*	82.5*

^{‡} Half points awarded as less than two thirds (2022 Thailand GP)/less than half (2023 Australian/2026 Thailand GP) of the race distance (but at least three full laps) was completed.
* Season still in progress.
