= 2020 Valencian Community motorcycle Grand Prix =

2020 Valencian Community Grand Prix
Race details
- Race 14 of 15 races in the 2020 Grand Prix motorcycle racing season
- Date: 15 November 2020
- Official name: Gran Premio Motul de la Comunitat Valenciana
- Location: Circuit Ricardo Tormo; Cheste, Valencia, Spain
- Course: Permanent racing facility; 4.005 km (2.489 mi)

MotoGP
Pole position
Rider	(Italy) Franco Morbidelli	Yamaha
Time	1:30.191	
Fastest lap
Rider	(Australia) Jack Miller	Ducati
Time	1:31.378 on lap 17	
Podium
First	(Italy) Franco Morbidelli	Yamaha
Second	(Australia) Jack Miller	Ducati
Third	(Spain) Pol Espargaró	KTM

Moto2
Pole position
Rider	(Italy) Stefano Manzi	MV Agusta
Time	1:34.418	
Fastest lap
Rider	(Spain) Héctor Garzó	Kalex
Time	1:35.291 on lap 9	
Podium
First	(Spain) Jorge Martín	Kalex
Second	(Spain) Héctor Garzó	Kalex
Third	(Italy) Marco Bezzecchi	Kalex

Moto3
Pole position
Rider	(South Africa) Darryn Binder	KTM
Time	1:38.286	
Fastest lap
Rider	(Spain) Sergio García	Honda
Time	1:38.858 on lap 6	
Podium
First	(Italy) Tony Arbolino	Honda
Second	(Spain) Sergio García	Honda
Third	(Spain) Raúl Fernández	KTM

The 2020 Valencian Community motorcycle Grand Prix (officially known as the Gran Premio Motul de la Comunitat Valenciana) was the fourteenth round of the 2020 Grand Prix motorcycle racing season and the thirteenth round of the 2020 MotoGP World Championship. It was held at the Circuit Ricardo Tormo in Valencia on 15 November 2020.

The race was won by Franco Morbidelli, whilst Joan Mir claimed the premier class title after securing seventh place. It was Mir's first premier class title in his career and his second championship overall after previously winning the 2017 Moto3 World Championship, which also made him the first Moto3 World Champion to win the premier class title since the introduction of the Moto3 category in 2012. This also marked the first rider's title for Suzuki since Kenny Roberts Jr. in 2000 and the maiden teams' championship title for the Japanese manufacturer respectively.

== Background ==
=== Impact of the COVID-19 pandemic ===
The opening rounds of the 2020 championship have been heavily affected by the COVID-19 pandemic. The Valencian Community Grand Prix, scheduled in the original calendar on November 15 as the twentieth and final stage of the season, was postponed by one week for the initial shift of the Grand Prix of the Americas (later cancelled on July 8) to the third Sunday in November (it was scheduled for April 5 as the third race of the championship). After the postponement of the Argentine Grand Prix (initially classified as the fourth Grand Prix of the season on April 19) to November 22, the Valencia stage was moved back by another week (the Argentine race was later cancelled on July 31). Several Grands Prix were cancelled or postponed after the opening round in Qatar was halted, prompting the Fédération Internationale de Motocyclisme to draft a new calendar. A new calendar based exclusively in Europe was announced on 11 June. The Valencian Community Grand Prix is classified as the fourteenth Grand Prix of the new calendar (the thirteenth for the MotoGP class) on November 15, as planned in the original one. It is preceded by the introduction of the European Grand Prix, which is also held on the Ricardo Tormo Circuit, after the organizers of the Valencian Community Grand Prix signed a contract with Dorna Sports, owner of the sport's commercial rights, to host a double grand prix in the Valencia circuit. With the inclusion of the Portuguese Grand Prix, which will be held on 22 November at the Autódromo Internacional do Algarve as the last race of the season, this also marks that for the first time since 2001 the championship finale will not be held in Valencia.

=== MotoGP Championship standings before the race ===
After the victory in the European Grand Prix, Joan Mir confirmed himself at the top of the drivers' classification with 162 points. Fabio Quartararo and Álex Rins are 37 points behind the leader, with the Frenchman second due to the victories won this season (3 vs 1) compared to the Spaniard, who nevertheless gained three positions in the overall standings. Maverick Viñales and Franco Morbidelli are fourth and fifth, with 121 and 117 points respectively.

In the constructors' standings, Suzuki climbs to the top of the standings with 181 points, overtaking Ducati (now at 181 points). Yamaha is third with 163 points, just 4 points ahead of KTM. Honda is fifth at 130 points, while Aprilia closes the standings at 36 points.

In the team championship standings, Team Suzuki Ecstar is confirmed first at 287, increasing its lead by 82 points over Petronas Yamaha SRT. Ducati Team and KTM Factory Racing are third and fourth with 194 and 182 points respectively, with Monster Energy Yamaha fifth at 159 points.

=== MotoGP entrants ===
- Stefan Bradl replaced Marc Márquez for the eleventh straight race while the latter recovered from injuries sustained in his opening round crash.
- Iker Lecuona, after missing the Valencian Community Grand Prix due to Andorran quarantine rules, as his brother and assistant had tested positive for the SARS-CoV-2 virus, was entered into the event and was due to compete from Saturday practice onwards; however, he tested positive on entry to the paddock and was subsequently withdrawn.

== Free practice ==
=== MotoGP ===
The first session ended with Takaaki Nakagami in the lead ahead of Franco Morbidelli and Maverick Viñales. In the second, Jack Miller was the fastest ahead of Nakagami and Francesco Bagnaia. In the third Morbidelli took the lead, followed by Pol Espargaró and Johann Zarco.

=== Combined Free Practice 1-2-3 ===
The top ten riders (written in bold) qualified in Q2.

Pos.	No.	Bikers	Constructor	Free practice times		
Pos.	No.	Bikers	Constructor	FP1	FP2	FP3
1	21	(Italy) **Franco Morbidelli**	**Yamaha**	1'30.944	1'31.125	**1'30.168**
2	43	(Australia) **Jack Miller**	**Ducati**	1'31.541	**1'30.622**	1'31.128
3	44	(Spain) **Pol Espargaró**	**KTM**	1'31.052	1'30.821	**1'30.636**
4	5	(France) **Johann Zarco**	**Ducati**	1'31.297	1'30.899	**1'30.658**
5	12	(Spain) **Maverick Viñales**	**Yamaha**	1'30.968	1'31.062	**1'30.697**
6	30	(Japan) **Takaaki Nakagami**	**Honda**	1'30.829	**1'30.713**	1'30.785
7	36	(Spain) **Joan Mir**	**Suzuki**	1'31.436	1'31.080	**1'30.734**
8	63	(Italy) **Francesco Bagnaia**	**Ducati**	1'31.828	**1'30.742**	1'31.280
9	88	(Portugal) **Miguel Oliveira**	**KTM**	1'31.486	1'31.330	**1'30.849**
10	41	(Spain) **Aleix Espargaró**	**Aprilia**	1'31.170	1'30.989	**1'30.865**
11	20	(France) Fabio Quartararo	Yamaha	1'31.617	1'31.326	**1'30.867**
12	9	(Italy) Danilo Petrucci	Ducati	1'31.805	1'31.230	**1'30.926**
13	4	(Italy) Andrea Dovizioso	Ducati	1'31.410	**1'30.926**	1'31.235
14	35	(United Kingdom) Cal Crutchlow	Honda	1'31.572	**1'30.930**	1'31.077
15	42	(Spain) Álex Rins	Suzuki	1'31.528	**1'30.947**	1'30.956
16	33	(South Africa) Brad Binder	KTM	1'31.678	1'31.261	**1'31.051**
17	6	(Germany) Stefan Bradl	Honda	1'31.514	**1'31.106**	1'31.942
18	46	(Italy) Valentino Rossi	Yamaha	1'31.545	**1'31.371**^{1}	1'31.372
19	73	(Spain) Álex Márquez	Honda	1'31.598	**1'31.371**^{1}	1'31.540
20	53	(Spain) Tito Rabat	Ducati	1'32.198	1'32.058	**1'31.714**
21	32	(Italy) Lorenzo Savadori	Aprilia	1'32.772	**1'32.393**	1'32.532
	27	(Spain) Iker Lecuona	KTM			
OFFICIAL MOTOGP COMBINED FREE PRACTICE TIMES REPORT

Notes

- **^1** – Valentino Rossi and Álex Márquez set identical times in FP2; Valentino Rossi was classified ahead as he set his lap time before Álex Márquez.

Fastest session lap

Personal Best lap

In the fourth session Álex Rins was the fastest ahead of Nakagami and Zarco.

== Qualifying ==
=== MotoGP ===
Pos.	No.	Biker	Constructor	Qualifying times		Final grid	Row
Pos.	No.	Biker	Constructor	Q1	Q2	Final grid	Row
1	21	(Italy) Franco Morbidelli	Yamaha	Qualified in Q2	1'30.191	1	1
2	43	(Australia) Jack Miller	Ducati	Qualified in Q2	1'30.287	2	1
3	30	(Japan) Takaaki Nakagami	Honda	Qualified in Q2	1'30.413	3	1
4	5	(France) Johann Zarco	Ducati	Qualified in Q2	1'30.520	4	2
5	44	(Spain) Pol Espargaró	KTM	Qualified in Q2	1'30.553	5	2
6	12	(Spain) Maverick Viñales	Yamaha	Qualified in Q2	1'30.645	6	2
7	41	(Spain) Aleix Espargaró	Aprilia	Qualified in Q2	1'30.657	7	3
8	63	(Italy) Francesco Bagnaia	Ducati	Qualified in Q2	1'30.671	8	3
9	33	(South Africa) Brad Binder	KTM	1'30.810	1'30.737	9	3
10	88	(Portugal) Miguel Oliveira	KTM	Qualified in Q2	1'30.781	10	4
11	20	(France) Fabio Quartararo	Yamaha	1'30.959	1'30.864	11	4
12	36	(Spain) Joan Mir	Suzuki	Qualified in Q2	1'30.988	12	4
13	35	(United Kingdom) Cal Crutchlow	Honda	1'31.159	N/A	13	5
14	42	(Spain) Álex Rins	Suzuki	1'31.594	N/A	14	5
15	9	(Italy) Danilo Petrucci	Ducati	1'31.601	N/A	15	5
16	46	(Italy) Valentino Rossi	Yamaha	1'31.604	N/A	16	6
17	4	(Italy) Andrea Dovizioso	Ducati	1'31.606	N/A	17	6
18	6	(Germany) Stefan Bradl	Honda	1'31.831	N/A	18	6
19	53	(Spain) Tito Rabat	Ducati	1'32.063	N/A	19	7
20	73	(Spain) Álex Márquez	Honda	1'32.205	N/A	20	7
21	32	(Italy) Lorenzo Savadori	Aprilia	1'32.237	N/A	21	7
OFFICIAL MOTOGP QUALIFYING RESULTS

== Warm up ==
=== MotoGP ===
In the warm up, Franco Morbidelli was the fastest ahead of Pol Espargaró and Takaaki Nakagami.

== Race ==
=== MotoGP ===
Pos.	No.	Rider	Team	Manufacturer	Laps	Time/Retired	Grid	Points
1	21	(Italy) Franco Morbidelli	Petronas Yamaha SRT	Yamaha	27	41:22.478	1	25
2	43	(Australia) Jack Miller	Pramac Racing	Ducati	27	+0.093	2	20
3	44	(Spain) Pol Espargaró	Red Bull KTM Factory Racing	KTM	27	+3.006	5	16
4	42	(Spain) Álex Rins	Team Suzuki Ecstar	Suzuki	27	+3.697	14	13
5	33	(South Africa) Brad Binder	Red Bull KTM Factory Racing	KTM	27	+4.127	9	11
6	88	(Portugal) Miguel Oliveira	Red Bull KTM Tech3	KTM	27	+7.272	10	10
7	36	(Spain) Joan Mir	Team Suzuki Ecstar	Suzuki	27	+8.703	12	9
8	4	(Italy) Andrea Dovizioso	Ducati Team	Ducati	27	+8.729	17	8
9	41	(Spain) Aleix Espargaró	Aprilia Racing Team Gresini	Aprilia	27	+15.512	7	7
10	12	(Spain) Maverick Viñales	Monster Energy Yamaha MotoGP	Yamaha	27	+19.043	6	6
11	63	(Italy) Francesco Bagnaia	Pramac Racing	Ducati	27	+19.456	8	5
12	46	(Italy) Valentino Rossi	Monster Energy Yamaha MotoGP	Yamaha	27	+19.717	16	4
13	35	(United Kingdom) Cal Crutchlow	LCR Honda Castrol	Honda	27	+23.802	13	3
14	6	(Germany) Stefan Bradl	Repsol Honda Team	Honda	27	+27.430	18	2
15	9	(Italy) Danilo Petrucci	Ducati Team	Ducati	27	+30.570	15	1
16	73	(Spain) Álex Márquez	Repsol Honda Team	Honda	27	+30.619	20	
17	53	(Spain) Tito Rabat	Esponsorama Racing	Ducati	27	+42.365	19	
18	32	(Italy) Lorenzo Savadori	Aprilia Racing Team Gresini	Aprilia	27	+46.472	21	
Ret	30	(Japan) Takaaki Nakagami	LCR Honda Idemitsu	Honda	18	Accident	3	
Ret	20	(France) Fabio Quartararo	Petronas Yamaha SRT	Yamaha	8	Accident	11	
Ret	5	(France) Johann Zarco	Esponsorama Racing	Ducati	5	Accident	4	
WD	27	(Spain) Iker Lecuona	Red Bull KTM Tech3	KTM		Withdrew		
Fastest lap: (Australia) Jack Miller (Ducati) – 1:31.378 (lap 17)

=== Moto2 ===
Pos.	No.	Rider	Manufacturer	Laps	Time/Retired	Grid	Points
1	88	(Spain) Jorge Martín	Kalex	25	40:02.225	5	25
2	40	(Spain) Héctor Garzó	Kalex	25	+0.072	2	20
3	72	(Italy) Marco Bezzecchi	Kalex	25	+0.204	3	16
4	23	(Germany) Marcel Schrötter	Kalex	25	+0.689	7	13
5	10	(Italy) Luca Marini	Kalex	25	+0.812	10	11
6	33	(Italy) Enea Bastianini	Kalex	25	+2.329	12	10
7	87	(Australia) Remy Gardner	Kalex	25	+8.973	19	9
8	64	(Netherlands) Bo Bendsneyder	NTS	25	+9.720	9	8
9	11	(Italy) Nicolò Bulega	Kalex	25	+11.596	14	7
10	7	(Italy) Lorenzo Baldassarri	Kalex	25	+11.836	8	6
11	16	(United States) Joe Roberts	Kalex	25	+12.369	16	5
12	45	(Japan) Tetsuta Nagashima	Kalex	25	+13.041	23	4
13	97	(Spain) Xavi Vierge	Kalex	25	+13.495	13	3
14	22	(United Kingdom) Sam Lowes	Kalex	25	+15.345	18	2
15	37	(Spain) Augusto Fernández	Kalex	25	+15.577	21	1
16	12	(Switzerland) Thomas Lüthi	Kalex	25	+18.954	17	
17	24	(Italy) Simone Corsi	MV Agusta	25	+26.947	11	
18	35	(Thailand) Somkiat Chantra	Kalex	25	+36.336	25	
19	55	(Malaysia) Hafizh Syahrin	Speed Up	25	+42.068	26	
20	99	(Malaysia) Kasma Daniel	Kalex	25	+46.792	28	
21	74	(Poland) Piotr Biesiekirski	NTS	25	+50.162	29	
Ret	21	(Italy) Fabio Di Giannantonio	Speed Up	24	Accident	4	
Ret	57	(Spain) Edgar Pons	Kalex	23	Accident	22	
Ret	44	(Spain) Arón Canet	Speed Up	21	Accident	20	
Ret	9	(Spain) Jorge Navarro	Speed Up	17	Accident	15	
Ret	19	(Italy) Lorenzo Dalla Porta	Kalex	14	Accident	24	
Ret	62	(Italy) Stefano Manzi	MV Agusta	10	Accident	1	
Ret	27	(Indonesia) Andi Farid Izdihar	Kalex	8	Accident	27	
Ret	42	(Spain) Marcos Ramírez	Kalex	6	Accident	6	
OFFICIAL MOTO2 RACE REPORT

=== Moto3 ===
Pos.	No.	Rider	Manufacturer	Laps	Time/Retired	Grid	Points
1	14	(Italy) Tony Arbolino	Honda	23	38:17.462	13	25
2	11	(Spain) Sergio García	Honda	23	+1.142	17	20
3	25	(Spain) Raúl Fernández	KTM	23	+1.297	3	16
4	75	(Spain) Albert Arenas	KTM	23	+2.825	6	13
5	40	(South Africa) Darryn Binder	KTM	23	+2.999	1	11
6	53	(Turkey) Deniz Öncü	KTM	23	+3.208	11	10
7	16	(Italy) Andrea Migno	KTM	23	+9.836	5	9
8	79	(Japan) Ai Ogura	Honda	23	+9.852	7	8
9	5	(Spain) Jaume Masiá	Honda	23	+9.864	4	7
10	52	(Spain) Jeremy Alcoba	Honda	23	+12.802	15	6
11	17	(United Kingdom) John McPhee	Honda	23	+12.879	16	5
12	55	(Italy) Romano Fenati	Husqvarna	23	+14.513	14	4
13	82	(Italy) Stefano Nepa	KTM	23	+15.340	19	3
14	23	(Italy) Niccolò Antonelli	Honda	23	+15.619	10	2
15	6	(Japan) Ryusei Yamanaka	Honda	23	+24.297	20	1
16	7	(Italy) Dennis Foggia	Honda	23	+24.320	27	
17	70	(Belgium) Barry Baltus	KTM	23	+24.666	24	
18	92	(Japan) Yuki Kunii	Honda	23	+24.690	12	
19	71	(Japan) Ayumu Sasaki	KTM	23	+27.484	26	
20	9	(Italy) Davide Pizzoli	KTM	23	+27.754	25	
21	99	(Spain) Carlos Tatay	KTM	23	+28.093	29	
22	50	(Switzerland) Jason Dupasquier	KTM	23	+28.138	23	
23	54	(Italy) Riccardo Rossi	KTM	23	+30.718 (Note: 3-second penalty for exceeding track limits.)	18	
24	13	(Italy) Celestino Vietti	KTM	23	+48.093	9	
Ret	89	(Malaysia) Khairul Idham Pawi	Honda	21	Accident	28	
Ret	2	(Argentina) Gabriel Rodrigo	Honda	7	Accident	30	
Ret	21	(Spain) Alonso López	Husqvarna	7	Accident	21	
Ret	27	(Japan) Kaito Toba	KTM	1	Accident	2	
Ret	24	(Japan) Tatsuki Suzuki	Honda	1	Accident	8	
Ret	73	(Austria) Maximilian Kofler	KTM	0	Accident	22	
DNS	12	(Czech Republic) Filip Salač	Honda		Did not start		
OFFICIAL MOTO3 RACE REPORT

- Filip Salač suffered a chest injury in a crash during practice and was declared unfit to compete.

== Championship standings after the race ==
Below are the standings for the top five riders, constructors, and teams after the round.

=== MotoGP ===
Riders' Championship standings

	Pos.	Rider	Points
	1	(Spain) Joan Mir	171
3	2	(Italy) Franco Morbidelli	142
	3	(Spain) Álex Rins	138
	4	(Spain) Maverick Viñales	127
3	5	(France) Fabio Quartararo	125

Constructors' Championship standings

Pos.	Constructor	Points
1	(Japan) Suzuki	201
2	(Italy) Ducati	201
3	(Japan) Yamaha	188 (Note: Yamaha scored 238 points as a manufacturer, but were deducted 50 points after failing to respect MSMA technical changes protocols.)
4	(Austria) KTM	175
5	(Japan) Honda	133

Teams' Championship standings

	Pos.	Team	Points
	1	(Japan) Team Suzuki Ecstar	309
	2	(Malaysia) Petronas Yamaha SRT	230 (Note: Petronas Yamaha SRT riders scored 267 points, but the team was deducted 37 points after failing to respect MSMA technical changes protocols.)
1	3	(Austria) Red Bull KTM Factory Racing	209
1	4	(Italy) Ducati Team	203
	5	(Japan) Monster Energy Yamaha MotoGP	169 (Note: Monster Energy Yamaha MotoGP riders scored 189 points, but the team was deducted 20 points after failing to respect MSMA technical changes protocols.)

=== Moto2 ===
Riders' Championship standings

Pos.	Rider	Points
1	(Italy) Enea Bastianini	194
2	(United Kingdom) Sam Lowes	180
3	(Italy) Luca Marini	176
4	(Italy) Marco Bezzecchi	171
5	(Spain) Jorge Martín	150

Constructors' Championship standings

Pos.	Constructor	Points
1	(Germany) Kalex	350
2	(Italy) Speed Up	117
3	(Italy) MV Agusta	32
4	(Japan) NTS	19

Teams' Championship standings

Pos.	Team	Points
1	(Italy) Sky Racing Team VR46	347
2	(Belgium) EG 0,0 Marc VDS	243
3	(Finland) Red Bull KTM Ajo	239
4	(Italy) Italtrans Racing Team	199
5	(Germany) Liqui Moly Intact GP	149

=== Moto3 ===
Riders' Championship standings

	Pos.	Rider	Points
	1	(Spain) Albert Arenas	170
	2	(Japan) Ai Ogura	162
2	3	(Italy) Tony Arbolino	159
1	4	(Spain) Jaume Masiá	140
2	5	(Italy) Celestino Vietti	137

Constructors' Championship standings

Pos.	Constructor	Points
1	(Japan) Honda	306
2	(Austria) KTM	293
3	(Sweden) Husqvarna	86

Teams' Championship standings

Pos.	Team	Points
1	(Luxembourg) Leopard Racing	209
2	(Spain) Gaviota Aspar Team Moto3	208
3	(Italy) Sky Racing Team VR46	197
4	(Italy) Rivacold Snipers Team	189
5	(Finland) Red Bull KTM Ajo	174

== Notes ==
Previous race: 2020 European Grand Prix	FIM Grand Prix World Championship; 2020 season	Next race: 2020 Portuguese Grand Prix
Previous race: 2019 Valencian Grand Prix	Valencian Community motorcycle Grand Prix	Next race: 2021 Valencian Grand Prix
