= 2021 Qatar motorcycle Grand Prix =

First round of the 2021 Grand Prix motorcycle racing season

2021 Qatar Grand Prix
Race details
- Race 1 of 18 races in the 2021 Grand Prix motorcycle racing season
- Date: 28 March 2021
- Official name: Barwa Grand Prix of Qatar
- Location: Losail International Circuit; Lusail, Qatar
- Course: Permanent racing facility; 5.380 km (3.343 mi)

MotoGP
Pole position
Rider	(Italy) Francesco Bagnaia	Ducati
Time	1:52.772	
Fastest lap
Rider	(Spain) Maverick Viñales	Yamaha
Time	1:54.624 on lap 4	
Podium
First	(Spain) Maverick Viñales	Yamaha
Second	(France) Johann Zarco	Ducati
Third	(Italy) Francesco Bagnaia	Ducati

Moto2
Pole position
Rider	(United Kingdom) Sam Lowes	Kalex
Time	1:58.726	
Fastest lap
Rider	(Australia) Remy Gardner	Kalex
Time	1:59.491 on lap 13	
Podium
First	(United Kingdom) Sam Lowes	Kalex
Second	(Australia) Remy Gardner	Kalex
Third	(Italy) Fabio Di Giannantonio	Kalex

Moto3
Pole position
Rider	(South Africa) Darryn Binder	Honda
Time	2:04.075	
Fastest lap
Rider	(Spain) Xavier Artigas	Honda
Time	2:06.557 on lap 2	
Podium
First	(Spain) Jaume Masiá	KTM
Second	(Spain) Pedro Acosta	KTM
Third	(South Africa) Darryn Binder	Honda

The 2021 Qatar motorcycle Grand Prix (officially known as the Barwa Grand Prix of Qatar) was the first round of the 2021 Grand Prix motorcycle racing season. It was held at the Losail International Circuit in Lusail on 28 March 2021.

== Background ==
=== MotoGP Entrants ===
Stefan Bradl replaced Marc Márquez for the start of the season, as Márquez prolonged his recovery from his 2020 season-ending injury.

== Free practice ==
=== MotoGP ===
In the first session, Franco Morbidelli was the fastest ahead of Aleix Espargaró and Jack Miller.

== Qualifying ==
=== MotoGP ===
Fastest session lap

Pos.	No.	Biker	Constructor	Qualifying times		Final grid	Row
Pos.	No.	Biker	Constructor	Q1	Q2	Final grid	Row
1	63	(Italy) Francesco Bagnaia	Ducati	Qualified in Q2	1:52.772	1	1
2	20	(France) Fabio Quartararo	Yamaha	Qualified in Q2	1:53.038	2	1
3	12	(Spain) Maverick Viñales	Yamaha	Qualified in Q2	1:53.088	3	1
4	46	(Italy) Valentino Rossi	Yamaha	Qualified in Q2	1:53.114	4	2
5	43	(Australia) Jack Miller	Ducati	Qualified in Q2	1:53.215	5	2
6	5	(France) Johann Zarco	Ducati	Qualified in Q2	1:53.286	6	2
7	21	(Italy) Franco Morbidelli	Yamaha	Qualified in Q2	1:53.313	7	3
8	41	(Spain) Aleix Espargaró	Aprilia	Qualified in Q2	1:53.315	8	3
9	42	(Spain) Álex Rins	Suzuki	Qualified in Q2	1:53.490	9	3
10	36	(Spain) Joan Mir	Suzuki	1:53.728	1:53.682	10	4
11	30	(Japan) Takaaki Nakagami	Honda	1:53.577	1:53.721	11	4
12	44	(Spain) Pol Espargaró	Honda	Qualified in Q2	1:53.930	12	4
13	23	(Italy) Enea Bastianini	Ducati	1:53.733	N/A	13	5
14	89	(Spain) Jorge Martín	Ducati	1:53.840	N/A	14	5
15	88	(Portugal) Miguel Oliveira	KTM	1:53.915	N/A	15	5
16	73	(Spain) Álex Márquez	Honda	1:53.958	N/A	16	6
17	6	(Germany) Stefan Bradl	Honda	1:53.995	N/A	17	6
18	10	(Italy) Luca Marini	Ducati	1:54.122	N/A	18	6
19	33	(South Africa) Brad Binder	KTM	1:54.240	N/A	19	7
20	9	(Italy) Danilo Petrucci	KTM	1:54.443	N/A	20	7
21	27	(Spain) Iker Lecuona	KTM	1:54.627	N/A	21	7
22	32	(Italy) Lorenzo Savadori	Aprilia	1:55.183	N/A	22	8
OFFICIAL MOTOGP QUALIFYING RESULTS

== Race ==
=== MotoGP ===
Pos.	No.	Rider	Team	Manufacturer	Laps	Time/Retired	Grid	Points
1	12	(Spain) Maverick Viñales	Monster Energy Yamaha MotoGP	Yamaha	22	42:28.663	3	25
2	5	(France) Johann Zarco	Pramac Racing	Ducati	22	+1.092	6	20
3	63	(Italy) Francesco Bagnaia	Ducati Lenovo Team	Ducati	22	+1.129	1	16
4	36	(Spain) Joan Mir	Team Suzuki Ecstar	Suzuki	22	+1.222	10	13
5	20	(France) Fabio Quartararo	Monster Energy Yamaha MotoGP	Yamaha	22	+3.030	2	11
6	42	(Spain) Álex Rins	Team Suzuki Ecstar	Suzuki	22	+3.357	9	10
7	41	(Spain) Aleix Espargaró	Aprilia Racing Team Gresini	Aprilia	22	+5.934	8	9
8	44	(Spain) Pol Espargaró	Repsol Honda Team	Honda	22	+5.990	12	8
9	43	(Australia) Jack Miller	Ducati Lenovo Team	Ducati	22	+7.058	5	7
10	23	(Italy) Enea Bastianini	Esponsorama Racing	Ducati	22	+9.288	13	6
11	6	(Germany) Stefan Bradl	Repsol Honda Team	Honda	22	+10.299	17	5
12	46	(Italy) Valentino Rossi	Petronas Yamaha SRT	Yamaha	22	+10.742	4	4
13	88	(Portugal) Miguel Oliveira	Red Bull KTM Factory Racing	KTM	22	+11.457	15	3
14	33	(South Africa) Brad Binder	Red Bull KTM Factory Racing	KTM	22	+14.100	19	2
15	89	(Spain) Jorge Martín	Pramac Racing	Ducati	22	+16.422	14	1
16	10	(Italy) Luca Marini	Sky VR46 Esponsorama	Ducati	22	+20.916	18	
17	27	(Spain) Iker Lecuona	Tech3 KTM Factory Racing	KTM	22	+21.026	21	
18	21	(Italy) Franco Morbidelli	Petronas Yamaha SRT	Yamaha	22	+23.892	7	
19	32	(Italy) Lorenzo Savadori	Aprilia Racing Team Gresini	Aprilia	22	+46.346	22	
Ret	73	(Spain) Álex Márquez	LCR Honda Castrol	Honda	13	Accident	16	
Ret	30	(Japan) Takaaki Nakagami	LCR Honda Idemitsu	Honda	6	Accident	11	
Ret	9	(Italy) Danilo Petrucci	Tech3 KTM Factory Racing	KTM	0	Accident	20	
Fastest lap: (Spain) Maverick Viñales (Yamaha) – 1:54.624 (lap 4)

=== Moto2 ===
Pos.	No.	Rider	Manufacturer	Laps	Time/Retired	Grid	Points
1	22	(United Kingdom) Sam Lowes	Kalex	20	40:03.123	1	25
2	87	(Australia) Remy Gardner	Kalex	20	+2.260	6	20
3	21	(Italy) Fabio Di Giannantonio	Kalex	20	+5.228	7	16
4	72	(Italy) Marco Bezzecchi	Kalex	20	+5.241	4	13
5	25	(Spain) Raúl Fernández	Kalex	20	+6.145	2	11
6	16	(United States) Joe Roberts	Kalex	20	+6.786	5	10
7	96	(United Kingdom) Jake Dixon	Kalex	20	+8.721	10	9
8	23	(Germany) Marcel Schrötter	Kalex	20	+10.911	13	8
9	64	(Netherlands) Bo Bendsneyder	Kalex	20	+12.493	3	7
10	9	(Spain) Jorge Navarro	Boscoscuro	20	+16.800	8	6
11	6	(United States) Cameron Beaubier	Kalex	20	+17.147	22	5
12	13	(Italy) Celestino Vietti	Kalex	20	+17.289	9	4
13	44	(Spain) Arón Canet	Boscoscuro	20	+17.527	12	3
14	37	(Spain) Augusto Fernández	Kalex	20	+17.540	21	2
15	12	(Switzerland) Thomas Lüthi	Kalex	20	+17.816	17	1
16	14	(Italy) Tony Arbolino	Kalex	20	+18.211	18	
17	79	(Japan) Ai Ogura	Kalex	20	+19.143	19	
18	19	(Italy) Lorenzo Dalla Porta	Kalex	20	+19.220	14	
19	62	(Italy) Stefano Manzi	Kalex	20	+25.806	24	
20	5	(Italy) Yari Montella	Boscoscuro	20	+30.664	27	
21	75	(Spain) Albert Arenas	Boscoscuro	20	+30.708	23	
22	11	(Italy) Nicolò Bulega	Kalex	20	+32.764	11	
Ret	35	(Thailand) Somkiat Chantra	Kalex	19	Accident	16	
Ret	97	(Spain) Xavi Vierge	Kalex	14	Accident	15	
Ret	40	(Spain) Héctor Garzó	Kalex	9	Accident	25	
Ret	55	(Malaysia) Hafizh Syahrin	NTS	9	Engine	28	
Ret	7	(Italy) Lorenzo Baldassarri	MV Agusta	6	Accident	26	
Ret	42	(Spain) Marcos Ramírez	Kalex	0	Rider In Pain	20	
DNS	24	(Italy) Simone Corsi	MV Agusta		Did not start		
DNS	70	(Belgium) Barry Baltus	NTS		Did not start		
OFFICIAL MOTO2 RACE REPORT

- Simone Corsi suffered a fractured wrist in a crash during qualifying and withdrew from the event.
- Barry Baltus suffered a fractured wrist in a crash during practice and withdrew from the event.

=== Moto3 ===
Pos.	No.	Rider	Manufacturer	Laps	Time/Retired	Grid	Points
1	5	(Spain) Jaume Masiá	KTM	18	38:29.620	5	25
2	37	(Spain) Pedro Acosta	KTM	18	+0.042	11	20
3	40	(South Africa) Darryn Binder	Honda	18	+0.094	1	16
4	11	(Spain) Sergio García	Gas Gas	18	+0.435	8	13
5	2	(Argentina) Gabriel Rodrigo	Honda	18	+0.880	7	11
6	23	(Italy) Niccolò Antonelli	KTM	18	+0.899	10	10
7	28	(Spain) Izan Guevara	Gas Gas	18	+0.965	2	9
8	24	(Japan) Tatsuki Suzuki	Honda	18	+2.214	28	8
9 (Note: 1-position penalty for exceeding track limits on the last lap.)	27	(Japan) Kaito Toba	KTM	18	+1.950	6	7
10	50	(Switzerland) Jason Dupasquier	KTM	18	+2.219	12	6
11	55	(Italy) Romano Fenati	Husqvarna	18	+2.316	18	5
12	99	(Spain) Carlos Tatay	KTM	18	+2.298	14	4
13	12	(Czech Republic) Filip Salač	Honda	18	+2.345	23	3
14	6	(Japan) Ryusei Yamanaka	KTM	18	+2.434	21	2
15	73	(Austria) Maximilian Kofler	KTM	18	+14.768	16	1
16	92	(Japan) Yuki Kunii	Honda	18	+14.834	20	
17	31	(Spain) Adrián Fernández	Husqvarna	18	+22.187	22	
18	82	(Italy) Stefano Nepa	KTM	18	+22.277	25	
19	20	(France) Lorenzo Fellon	Honda	18	+28.282	27	
20	53	(Turkey) Deniz Öncü	KTM	18	+41.283	19	
21	19	(Indonesia) Andi Farid Izdihar	Honda	18	+44.976	26	
Ret	71	(Japan) Ayumu Sasaki	KTM	17	Accident	15	
Ret	43	(Spain) Xavier Artigas	Honda	7	Collision Damage	24	
Ret	17	(United Kingdom) John McPhee	Honda	2	Collision	3	
Ret	16	(Italy) Andrea Migno	Honda	2	Collision Damage	17	
Ret	52	(Spain) Jeremy Alcoba	Honda	2	Collision Damage	4	
Ret	54	(Italy) Riccardo Rossi	KTM	1	Accident	9	
Ret	7	(Italy) Dennis Foggia	Honda	0	Collision	13	
OFFICIAL MOTO3 RACE REPORT

== Championship standings after the race ==
Below are the standings for the top five riders, constructors, and teams after the round.

=== MotoGP ===
Riders' Championship standings

Pos.	Rider	Points
1	(Spain) Maverick Viñales	25
2	(France) Johann Zarco	20
3	(Italy) Francesco Bagnaia	16
4	(Spain) Joan Mir	13
5	(France) Fabio Quartararo	11

Constructors' Championship standings

Pos.	Constructor	Points
1	(Japan) Yamaha	25
2	(Italy) Ducati	20
3	(Japan) Suzuki	13
4	(Italy) Aprilia	9
5	(Japan) Honda	8

Teams' Championship standings

Pos.	Team	Points
1	(Japan) Monster Energy Yamaha MotoGP	36
2	(Italy) Ducati Lenovo Team	23
3	(Japan) Team Suzuki Ecstar	23
4	(Italy) Pramac Racing	21
5	(Japan) Repsol Honda Team	13

=== Moto2 ===
Riders' Championship standings

Pos.	Rider	Points
1	(United Kingdom) Sam Lowes	25
2	(Australia) Remy Gardner	20
3	(Italy) Fabio Di Giannantonio	16
4	(Italy) Marco Bezzecchi	13
5	(Spain) Raúl Fernández	11

Constructors' Championship standings

Pos.	Constructor	Points
1	(Germany) Kalex	25
2	(Italy) Boscoscuro	6

Teams' Championship standings

Pos.	Team	Points
1	(Finland) Red Bull KTM Ajo	31
2	(Belgium) Elf Marc VDS Racing Team	27
3	(Italy) Sky Racing Team VR46	17
4	(Italy) Federal Oil Gresini Moto2	16
5	(Italy) Italtrans Racing Team	10

=== Moto3 ===
Riders' Championship standings

Pos.	Rider	Points
1	(Spain) Jaume Masiá	25
2	(Spain) Pedro Acosta	20
3	(South Africa) Darryn Binder	16
4	(Spain) Sergio García	13
5	(Argentina) Gabriel Rodrigo	11

Constructors' Championship standings

Pos.	Constructor	Points
1	(Austria) KTM	25
2	(Japan) Honda	16
3	(Spain) Gas Gas	13
3	(Sweden) Husqvarna	5

Teams' Championship standings

Pos.	Team	Points
1	(Finland) Red Bull KTM Ajo	45
2	(Spain) GasGas Gaviota Aspar	22
3	(Malaysia) Petronas Sprinta Racing	16
4	(Spain) Avintia Esponsorama Moto3	14
5	(Italy) Indonesian Racing Gresini Moto3	11

== Notes ==
Previous race: 2020 Portuguese Grand Prix	FIM Grand Prix World Championship; 2021 season	Next race: 2021 Doha Grand Prix
Previous race: 2020 Qatar Grand Prix	Qatar motorcycle Grand Prix	Next race: 2022 Qatar Grand Prix
