= 2020 Portuguese motorcycle Grand Prix =

(Portugal) 2020 Portuguese Grand Prix
Race details
- Race 15 of 15 races in the 2020 Grand Prix motorcycle racing season
- Date: 22 November 2020
- Official name: Grande Prémio MEO de Portugal
- Location: Autódromo Internacional do Algarve; Portimão, Algarve, Portugal
- Course: Permanent racing facility; 4.592 km (2.853 mi)

MotoGP
Pole position
| Rider | (Portugal) Miguel Oliveira | KTM |
| Time | 1:38.892 | |
Fastest lap
| Rider | (Portugal) Miguel Oliveira | KTM |
| Time | 1:39.855 on lap 9 | |
Podium
| First | (Portugal) Miguel Oliveira | KTM |
| Second | (Australia) Jack Miller | Ducati |
| Third | (Italy) Franco Morbidelli | Yamaha |

Moto2
Pole position
| Rider | (Australia) Remy Gardner | Kalex |
| Time | 1:42.592 | |
Fastest lap
| Rider | (Australia) Remy Gardner | Kalex |
| Time | 1:42.504 on lap 23 | |
Podium
| First | (Australia) Remy Gardner | Kalex |
| Second | (Italy) Luca Marini | Kalex |
| Third | (United Kingdom) Sam Lowes | Kalex |

Moto3
Pole position
| Rider | (Spain) Raúl Fernández | KTM |
| Time | 1:48.051 | |
Fastest lap
| Rider | (Spain) Raúl Fernández | KTM |
| Time | 1:47.858 on lap 4 | |
Podium
| First | (Spain) Raúl Fernández | KTM |
| Second | (Italy) Dennis Foggia | Honda |
| Third | (Spain) Jeremy Alcoba | Honda |

The 2020 Portuguese motorcycle Grand Prix (officially known as the Grande Prémio MEO de Portugal) was the fifteenth and final round of the 2020 Grand Prix motorcycle racing season and the fourteenth and final round of the 2020 MotoGP World Championship. It was held at the Autódromo Internacional do Algarve in Portimão on 22 November 2020.

Enea Bastianini and Albert Arenas clinched the world championship title in Moto2 and Moto3 category respectively after a dramatic finale in both classes. Both riders secured their respective first world championship title in their career on Grand Prix motorcycling level.

== Background ==
=== Impact of the COVID-19 pandemic ===
The opening rounds of the 2020 championship have been heavily affected by the COVID-19 pandemic. Several Grands Prix were cancelled or postponed after the opening round in Qatar was halted, prompting the Fédération Internationale de Motocyclisme to draft a new calendar. A new calendar based exclusively in Europe was announced on 11 June. The Portuguese Grand Prix, absent from the calendar since 2012 (when it took place at the Autódromo do Estoril), was introduced as the last stage of the championship; this is the first time the season finale has not been held in Valencia since 2001. The race is held at the Autódromo Internacional do Algarve, which has served as MotoGP's reserve track since 2017; it is the first time that this circuit hosts a Grand Prix and is the seventy-third circuit which hosts a World Championship race.

=== MotoGP Championship standings before the race ===
After having achieved the arithmetic certainty of winning the World Championship, Joan Mir leads the riders' standings with 171 points, 29 more than Franco Morbidelli who won the previous Grand Prix and gained three positions in the general classification. Álex Rins is third with 138 points, followed by Maverick Viñales and Fabio Quartararo with 127 and 125 points, respectively.

In the constructors' standings, Suzuki and Ducati are leading with 201 points, followed by Yamaha and KTM with 13 and 26 points behind. Honda is fifth at 133 points, while Aprilia closes the standings at 43 points.

In the team championship standings, Team Suzuki Ecstar took the title and leads with 309 points, 79 more than Petronas Yamaha SRT. KTM Factory Racing outstripped Ducati Team for third position (209 vs 203 points), with Monster Energy Yamaha fifth at 169 points.

=== Moto2 and Moto3 Championship riders' standings before the race ===
In the intermediate class, four riders are still fighting for the title, with Enea Bastianini leading with 194 points, followed by Sam Lowes with 180 points. Luca Marini and Marco Bezzecchi are third and fourth at 176 and 171 points respectively.

In the lightweight class, there are still three drivers in the running with Albert Arenas first at 170 points, followed by Ai Ogura and Tony Arbolino with respectively 8 and 11 points behind.

=== MotoGP entrants ===
- Stefan Bradl replaced Marc Márquez for the twelfth straight race while the latter recovered from injuries sustained in his opening round crash.
- Iker Lecuona, after having tested positive at the entrance to the Valencia paddock before the Valencian Community Grand Prix, is also forced to miss the Portuguese Grand Prix, being replaced by the official KTM test driver Mika Kallio.

== Free practice ==
=== MotoGP ===
In the first session, home rider Miguel Oliveira was the fastest ahead of Maverick Viñales and Aleix Espargaró. In the second session Johann Zarco took the lead, with Viñales and Espargaró confirming themselves as second and third. In the third session Jack Miller finished ahead of everyone, followed by Oliveira and Álex Rins. In the combined standings, the new world champion Joan Mir and the winner of the previous race Franco Morbidelli remain excluded from Q2.

=== Combined Free Practice 1-2-3 ===
The top ten riders (written in bold) qualified in Q2.

| Pos. | No. | Bikers | Constructor | Free practice times | | |
| Pos. | No. | Bikers | Constructor | FP1 | FP2 | FP3 |
|---|---|---|---|---|---|---|
| 1 | 43 | (Australia) **Jack Miller** | **Ducati** | 1:41.271 | 1:39.820 | **1:39.205** |
| 2 | 88 | (Portugal) **Miguel Oliveira** | **KTM** | 1:40.122 | 1:39.946 | **1:39.330** |
| 3 | 42 | (Spain) **Álex Rins** | **Suzuki** | 1:40.960 | 1:40.213 | **1:39.355** |
| 4 | 4 | (Italy) **Andrea Dovizioso** | **Ducati** | 1:40.961 | 1:39.741 | **1:39.404** |
| 5 | 30 | (Japan) **Takaaki Nakagami** | **Honda** | 1:40.878 | 1:39.939 | **1:39.411** |
| 6 | 5 | (France) **Johann Zarco** | **Ducati** | 1:41.181 | **1:39.417** | 1:39.801 |
| 7 | 20 | (France) **Fabio Quartararo** | **Yamaha** | 1:40.877 | 1:39.692 | **1:39.480** |
| 8 | 44 | (Spain) **Pol Espargaró** | **KTM** | 1:40.680 | 1:39.783 | **1:39.513** |
| 9 | 12 | (Spain) **Maverick Viñales** | **Yamaha** | 1:40.162 | **1:39.536** | 1:39.693 |
| 10 | 6 | (Germany) **Stefan Bradl** | **Honda** | 1:40.920 | 1:39.909 | **1:39.569** |
| 11 | 21 | (Italy) Franco Morbidelli | Yamaha | 1:41.167 | 1:39.888 | **1:39.619** |
| 12 | 41 | (Spain) Aleix Espargaró | Aprilia | 1:40.236 | **1:39.645** | 1:39.732 |
| 13 | 33 | (South Africa) Brad Binder | KTM | 1:42.082 | **1:39.697** | 1:40.030 |
| 14 | 35 | (United Kingdom) Cal Crutchlow | Honda | 1:40.695 | 1:39.966 | **1:39.717** |
| 15 | 36 | (Spain) Joan Mir | Suzuki | 1:40.856 | **1:39.732** | 1:39.951 |
| 16 | 32 | (Italy) Lorenzo Savadori | Aprilia | 1:40.297 | 1:40.085 | **1:39.934** |
| 17 | 63 | (Italy) Francesco Bagnaia | Ducati | 1:41.433 | **1:39.977** | 1:40.448 |
| 18 | 73 | (Spain) Álex Márquez | Honda | 1:41.228 | 1:40.338 | **1:40.005** |
| 19 | 9 | (Italy) Danilo Petrucci | Ducati | 1:41.928 | 1:40.547 | **1:40.484** |
| 20 | 46 | (Italy) Valentino Rossi | Yamaha | 1:41.946 | 1:41.279 | **1:40.722** |
| 21 | 53 | (Spain) Tito Rabat | Ducati | 1:43.154 | **1:41.256** | 1:41.256 |
| 22 | 82 | (Finland) Mika Kallio | KTM | 1:43.920 | **1:41.826** | 1:42.468 |
OFFICIAL MOTOGP COMBINED FREE PRACTICE TIMES REPORT

Fastest session lap

Personal Best lap

In the fourth session Pol Espargaró was the fastest ahead of Miguel Oliveira and Takaaki Nakagami.

=== Moto2 ===
In the combined free practice times table, Remy Gardner was the fastest ahead of Luca Marini and Héctor Garzó. Sam Lowes is fifth, championship leader Enea Bastianini is ninth while Marco Bezzecchi is fifteenth and does not enter directly into Q2.

=== Moto3 ===
In the free practice combined, Jaume Masiá was the fastest ahead of Albert Arenas and Jeremy Alcoba. Arenas 'opponents for the drivers' title, Ai Ogura and Tony Arbolino, are fifteenth and twenty-two and does not enter directly into Q2.

== Qualifying ==
=== MotoGP ===
| Pos. | No. | Biker | Constructor | Qualifying times | | Final grid | Row |
| Pos. | No. | Biker | Constructor | Q1 | Q2 | Final grid | Row |
|---|---|---|---|---|---|---|---|
| 1 | 88 | (Portugal) Miguel Oliveira | KTM | Qualified in Q2 | 1:38.892 | 1 | 1 |
| 2 | 21 | (Italy) Franco Morbidelli | Yamaha | 1:39.276 | 1:38.936 | 2 | 1 |
| 3 | 43 | (Australia) Jack Miller | Ducati | Qualified in Q2 | 1:39.038 | 3 | 1 |
| 4 | 35 | (United Kingdom) Cal Crutchlow | Honda | 1:39.250 | 1:39.156 | 4 | 2 |
| 5 | 20 | (France) Fabio Quartararo | Yamaha | Qualified in Q2 | 1:39.199 | 5 | 2 |
| 6 | 6 | (Germany) Stefan Bradl | Honda | Qualified in Q2 | 1:39.204 | 6 | 2 |
| 7 | 5 | (France) Johann Zarco | Ducati | Qualified in Q2 | 1:39.238 | 7 | 3 |
| 8 | 12 | (Spain) Maverick Viñales | Yamaha | Qualified in Q2 | 1:39.260 | 8 | 3 |
| 9 | 44 | (Spain) Pol Espargaró | KTM | Qualified in Q2 | 1:39.284 | 9 | 3 |
| 10 | 42 | (Spain) Álex Rins | Suzuki | Qualified in Q2 | 1:39.467 | 10 | 4 |
| 11 | 30 | (Japan) Takaaki Nakagami | Honda | Qualified in Q2 | 1:39.531 | 11 | 4 |
| 12 | 4 | (Italy) Andrea Dovizioso | Ducati | Qualified in Q2 | 1:39.587 | 12 | 4 |
| 13 | 33 | (South Africa) Brad Binder | KTM | 1:39.390 | N/A | 13 | 5 |
| 14 | 41 | (Spain) Aleix Espargaró | Aprilia | 1:39.762 | N/A | 14 | 5 |
| 15 | 63 | (Italy) Francesco Bagnaia | Ducati | 1:40.019 | N/A | 15 | 5 |
| 16 | 73 | (Spain) Álex Márquez | Honda | 1:40.049 | N/A | 16 | 6 |
| 17 | 46 | (Italy) Valentino Rossi | Yamaha | 1:40.058 | N/A | 17 | 6 |
| 18 | 9 | (Italy) Danilo Petrucci | Ducati | 1:40.091 | N/A | 18 | 6 |
| 19 | 32 | (Italy) Lorenzo Savadori | Aprilia | 1:40.174 | N/A | 19 | 7 |
| 20 | 36 | (Spain) Joan Mir | Suzuki | 1:40.290 | N/A | 20 | 7 |
| 21 | 53 | (Spain) Tito Rabat | Ducati | 1:40.427 | N/A | 21 | 7 |
| 22 | 82 | (Finland) Mika Kallio | KTM | 1:41.753 | N/A | 22 | 8 |
OFFICIAL MOTOGP QUALIFYING RESULTS

=== Moto2 ===
Remy Gardner took pole position with a time of 1:42.592, with Luca Marini second at +0.118 sec. and Fabio Di Giannantonio at +0.129 sec.. Enea Bastianini is fourth, followed by Sam Lowes. Marco Bezzecchi, after passing Q1, qualifies twelfth.

=== Moto3 ===
Raul Fernandez takes pole position with a time of 1:48.051, followed by Jeremy Alcoba at +0.185 sec. and from Ayumu Sasaki to +0.240 sec.. Among the contenders for the bikers' title, Ai Ogura beats Q1 and in Q2 qualifies fifth ahead of Albert Arenas, while Tony Arbolino does not exceed Q1 (thirteenth time) and finishes in twenty-seventh place.

== Warm up ==
=== MotoGP ===
In the warm up, Cal Crutchlow was the fastest ahead of teammate Takaaki Nakagami and Brad Binder.

=== Moto2 ===
Remy Gardner was the fastest biker also in the warm up, ahead of Jorge Martin and Luca Marini.

=== Moto3 ===
Jaume Masiá was placed in front of everyone, followed by Tony Arbolino and Dennis Foggia.

== Race ==
=== MotoGP ===
| Pos. | No. | Rider | Team | Manufacturer | Laps | Time/Retired | Grid | Points |
|---|---|---|---|---|---|---|---|---|
| 1 | 88 | (Portugal) Miguel Oliveira | Red Bull KTM Tech3 | KTM | 25 | 41:48.163 | 1 | 25 |
| 2 | 43 | (Australia) Jack Miller | Pramac Racing | Ducati | 25 | +3.193 | 3 | 20 |
| 3 | 21 | (Italy) Franco Morbidelli | Petronas Yamaha SRT | Yamaha | 25 | +3.298 | 2 | 16 |
| 4 | 44 | (Spain) Pol Espargaró | Red Bull KTM Factory Racing | KTM | 25 | +12.626 | 9 | 13 |
| 5 | 30 | (Japan) Takaaki Nakagami | LCR Honda Idemitsu | Honda | 25 | +13.318 | 11 | 11 |
| 6 | 4 | (Italy) Andrea Dovizioso | Ducati Team | Ducati | 25 | +15.578 | 12 | 10 |
| 7 | 6 | (Germany) Stefan Bradl | Repsol Honda Team | Honda | 25 | +15.738 | 6 | 9 |
| 8 | 41 | (Spain) Aleix Espargaró | Aprilia Racing Team Gresini | Aprilia | 25 | +16.034 | 14 | 8 |
| 9 | 73 | (Spain) Álex Márquez | Repsol Honda Team | Honda | 25 | +18.325 | 16 | 7 |
| 10 | 5 | (France) Johann Zarco | Esponsorama Racing | Ducati | 25 | +18.596 | 7 | 6 |
| 11 | 12 | (Spain) Maverick Viñales | Monster Energy Yamaha MotoGP | Yamaha | 25 | +18.685 | 8 | 5 |
| 12 | 46 | (Italy) Valentino Rossi | Monster Energy Yamaha MotoGP | Yamaha | 25 | +18.946 | 17 | 4 |
| 13 | 35 | (United Kingdom) Cal Crutchlow | LCR Honda Castrol | Honda | 25 | +19.159 | 4 | 3 |
| 14 | 20 | (France) Fabio Quartararo | Petronas Yamaha SRT | Yamaha | 25 | +24.376 | 5 | 2 |
| 15 | 42 | (Spain) Álex Rins | Team Suzuki Ecstar | Suzuki | 25 | +27.776 | 10 | 1 |
| 16 | 9 | (Italy) Danilo Petrucci | Ducati Team | Ducati | 25 | +34.266 | 18 | |
| 17 | 82 | (Finland) Mika Kallio | Red Bull KTM Tech3 | KTM | 25 | +48.410 | 22 | |
| 18 | 53 | (Spain) Tito Rabat | Esponsorama Racing | Ducati | 25 | +48.411 | 21 | |
| Ret | 32 | (Italy) Lorenzo Savadori | Aprilia Racing Team Gresini | Aprilia | 22 | Accident | 19 | |
| Ret | 36 | (Spain) Joan Mir | Team Suzuki Ecstar | Suzuki | 15 | Electronics | 20 | |
| Ret | 33 | (South Africa) Brad Binder | Red Bull KTM Factory Racing | KTM | 2 | Accident | 13 | |
| Ret | 63 | (Italy) Francesco Bagnaia | Pramac Racing | Ducati | 0 | Arm Pain | 15 | |
Fastest lap: (Portugal) Miguel Oliveira (KTM) – 1:39.855 (lap 9)

=== Moto2 ===
| Pos. | No. | Biker | Constructor | Laps | Time/Retired | Grid | Points |
|---|---|---|---|---|---|---|---|
| 1 | 87 | (Australia) Remy Gardner | Kalex | 23 | 39:35.476 | 1 | 25 |
| 2 | 10 | (Italy) Luca Marini | Kalex | 23 | +1.609 | 2 | 20 |
| 3 | 22 | (United Kingdom) Sam Lowes | Kalex | 23 | +3.813 | 5 | 16 |
| 4 | 72 | (Italy) Marco Bezzecchi | Kalex | 23 | +8.437 | 12 | 13 |
| 5 | 33 | (Italy) Enea Bastianini | Kalex | 23 | +8.646 | 4 | 11 |
| 6 | 88 | (Spain) Jorge Martín | Kalex | 23 | +8.899 | 6 | 10 |
| 7 | 16 | (United States) Joe Roberts | Kalex | 23 | +8.956 | 18 | 9 |
| 8 | 37 | (Spain) Augusto Fernández | Kalex | 23 | +9.568 | 8 | 8 |
| 9 | 7 | (Italy) Lorenzo Baldassarri | Kalex | 23 | +10.367 | 17 | 7 |
| 10 | 97 | (Spain) Xavi Vierge | Kalex | 23 | +11.084 | 13 | 6 |
| 11 | 42 | (Spain) Marcos Ramírez | Kalex | 23 | +11.199 | 9 | 5 |
| 12 | 23 | (Germany) Marcel Schrötter | Kalex | 23 | +16.864 | 21 | 4 |
| 13 | 64 | (Netherlands) Bo Bendsneyder | NTS | 23 | +16.998 | 16 | 3 |
| 14 | 45 | (Japan) Tetsuta Nagashima | Kalex | 23 | +18.550 | 10 | 2 |
| 15 | 44 | (Spain) Arón Canet | Speed Up | 23 | +20.169 | 15 | 1 |
| 16 | 12 | (Switzerland) Thomas Lüthi | Kalex | 23 | +22.918 | 24 | |
| 17 | 19 | (Italy) Lorenzo Dalla Porta | Kalex | 23 | +27.141 | 20 | |
| 18 | 35 | (Thailand) Somkiat Chantra | Kalex | 23 | +27.303 | 27 | |
| 19 | 62 | (Italy) Stefano Manzi | MV Agusta | 23 | +27.340 | 19 | |
| 20 | 77 | (Switzerland) Dominique Aegerter | NTS | 23 | +44.924 | 22 | |
| 21 | 55 | (Malaysia) Hafizh Syahrin | Speed Up | 23 | +51.163 | 28 | |
| Ret | 24 | (Italy) Simone Corsi | MV Agusta | 20 | Mechanical | 25 | |
| Ret | 27 | (Indonesia) Andi Farid Izdihar | Kalex | 17 | Accident | 26 | |
| Ret | 57 | (Spain) Edgar Pons | Kalex | 12 | Mechanical | 23 | |
| Ret | 99 | (Malaysia) Kasma Daniel | Kalex | 10 | Accident | 29 | |
| Ret | 9 | (Spain) Jorge Navarro | Speed Up | 5 | Accident | 14 | |
| Ret | 40 | (Spain) Héctor Garzó | Kalex | 5 | Accident | 11 | |
| Ret | 21 | (Italy) Fabio Di Giannantonio | Speed Up | 0 | Accident | 3 | |
| Ret | 11 | (Italy) Nicolò Bulega | Kalex | 0 | Accident | 7 | |
Fastest lap: (Australia) Remy Gardner (Kalex) – 1:42.504 (lap 23)
OFFICIAL MOTO2 RACE REPORT

=== Moto3 ===
| Pos. | No. | Biker | Constructor | Laps | Time/Retired | Grid | Points |
|---|---|---|---|---|---|---|---|
| 1 | 25 | (Spain) Raúl Fernández | KTM | 21 | 38:06.272 | 1 | 25 |
| 2 | 7 | (Italy) Dennis Foggia | Honda | 21 | +5.810 | 8 | 20 |
| 3 | 52 | (Spain) Jeremy Alcoba | Honda | 21 | +5.866 | 2 | 16 |
| 4 | 11 | (Spain) Sergio García | Honda | 21 | +6.447 | 12 | 13 |
| 5 | 14 | (Italy) Tony Arbolino | Honda | 21 | +12.998 | 27 | 11 |
| 6 | 40 | (South Africa) Darryn Binder | KTM | 21 | +13.065 | 18 | 10 |
| 7 | 13 | (Italy) Celestino Vietti | KTM | 21 | +13.907 | 14 | 9 |
| 8 | 79 | (Japan) Ai Ogura | Honda | 21 | +13.929 | 5 | 8 |
| 9 | 17 | (United Kingdom) John McPhee | Honda | 21 | +13.945 | 19 | 7 |
| 10 | 53 | (Turkey) Deniz Öncü | KTM | 21 | +14.438 | 11 | 6 |
| 11 | 23 | (Italy) Niccolò Antonelli | Honda | 21 | +14.487 | 7 | 5 |
| 12 | 75 | (Spain) Albert Arenas | KTM | 21 | +14.708 | 6 | 4 |
| 13 | 71 | (Japan) Ayumu Sasaki | KTM | 21 | +19.285 | 3 | 3 |
| 14 | 99 | (Spain) Carlos Tatay | KTM | 21 | +23.195 | 29 | 2 |
| 15 | 27 | (Japan) Kaito Toba | KTM | 21 | +24.233 | 17 | 1 |
| 16 | 70 | (Belgium) Barry Baltus | KTM | 21 | +24.260 | 13 | |
| 17 | 6 | (Japan) Ryusei Yamanaka | Honda | 21 | +24.321 | 31 | |
| 18 | 31 | (Spain) Adrián Fernández | Honda | 21 | +24.425 | 20 | |
| 19 | 82 | (Italy) Stefano Nepa | KTM | 21 | +24.625 | 22 | |
| 20 | 55 | (Italy) Romano Fenati | Husqvarna | 21 | +24.672 | 23 | |
| 21 | 16 | (Italy) Andrea Migno | KTM | 21 | +27.637 | 16 | |
| 22 | 92 | (Japan) Yuki Kunii | Honda | 21 | +34.490 | 15 | |
| 23 | 50 | (Switzerland) Jason Dupasquier | KTM | 21 | +34.884 | 30 | |
| 24 | 54 | (Italy) Riccardo Rossi | KTM | 21 | +35.003 | 25 | |
| 25 | 73 | (Austria) Maximilian Kofler | KTM | 21 | +35.092 | 24 | |
| 26 | 9 | (Italy) Davide Pizzoli | KTM | 21 | +35.216 | 28 | |
| 27 | 2 | (Argentina) Gabriel Rodrigo | Honda | 21 | +40.329 | 10 | |
| 28 | 89 | (Malaysia) Khairul Idham Pawi | Honda | 21 | +46.973 | 21 | |
| Ret | 24 | (Japan) Tatsuki Suzuki | Honda | 19 | Accident | 4 | |
| Ret | 5 | (Spain) Jaume Masiá | Honda | 17 | Accident | 9 | |
| Ret | 21 | (Spain) Alonso López | Husqvarna | 14 | Accident | 26 | |
Fastest lap: (Spain) Raúl Fernández (KTM) – 1:47.858 (lap 4)
OFFICIAL MOTO3 RACE REPORT

== Championship standings after the race ==
Below are the standings for the top five riders, constructors, and teams after the round.

=== MotoGP ===
Riders' Championship standings

| | Pos. | Biker | Points |
|---|---|---|---|
| | 1 | (Spain) Joan Mir | 171 |
| | 2 | (Italy) Franco Morbidelli | 158 |
| | 3 | (Spain) Álex Rins | 139 |
| 2 | 4 | (Italy) Andrea Dovizioso | 135 |
| 2 | 5 | (Spain) Pol Espargaró | 135 |

Constructors' Championship standings

| | Pos. | Constructor | Points |
|---|---|---|---|
| 1 | 1 | (Italy) Ducati | 221 |
| 1 | 2 | (Japan) Yamaha | 204 (Note: Yamaha scored 254 points as a manufacturer, but were deducted 50 points after failing to respect MSMA technical changes protocols.) |
| 2 | 3 | (Japan) Suzuki | 202 |
| | 4 | (Austria) KTM | 200 |
| | 5 | (Japan) Honda | 144 |

Teams' Championship standings

| | Pos. | Team | Points |
|---|---|---|---|
| | 1 | (Japan) Team Suzuki Ecstar | 310 |
| | 2 | (Malaysia) Petronas Yamaha SRT | 248 (Note: Petronas Yamaha SRT riders scored 285 points, but the team was deducted 37 points after failing to respect MSMA technical changes protocols.) |
| | 3 | (Austria) Red Bull KTM Factory Racing | 222 |
| | 4 | (Italy) Ducati Team | 213 |
| 1 | 5 | (Italy) Pramac Racing | 183 |

=== Moto2 ===
Riders' Championship standings

| | Pos. | Biker | Points |
|---|---|---|---|
| | 1 | (Italy) Enea Bastianini | 205 |
| 1 | 2 | (Italy) Luca Marini | 196 |
| 1 | 3 | (United Kingdom) Sam Lowes | 196 |
| | 4 | (Italy) Marco Bezzecchi | 184 |
| | 5 | (Spain) Jorge Martín | 160 |

Constructors' Championship standings

| Pos. | Constructor | Points |
|---|---|---|
| 1 | (Germany) Kalex | 375 |
| 2 | (Italy) Speed Up | 118 |
| 3 | (Italy) MV Agusta | 32 |
| 4 | (Japan) NTS | 22 |

Teams' Championship standings

| Pos. | Team | Points |
|---|---|---|
| 1 | (Italy) Sky Racing Team VR46 | 380 |
| 2 | (Belgium) EG 0,0 Marc VDS | 267 |
| 3 | (Finland) Red Bull KTM Ajo | 251 |
| 4 | (Italy) Italtrans Racing Team | 210 |
| 5 | (Germany) Liqui Moly Intact GP | 153 |

=== Moto3 ===
Riders' Championship standings

| | Pos. | Biker | Points |
|---|---|---|---|
| | 1 | (Spain) Albert Arenas | 174 |
| 1 | 2 | (Italy) Tony Arbolino | 170 |
| 1 | 3 | (Japan) Ai Ogura | 170 |
| 2 | 4 | (Spain) Raúl Fernández | 159 |
| | 5 | (Italy) Celestino Vietti | 146 |

Constructors' Championship standings

| Pos. | Constructor | Points |
|---|---|---|
| 1 | (Japan) Honda | 326 |
| 2 | (Austria) KTM | 318 |
| 3 | (Sweden) Husqvarna | 86 |

Teams' Championship standings

| | Pos. | Team | Points |
|---|---|---|---|
| | 1 | (Luxembourg) Leopard Racing | 229 |
| | 2 | (Spain) Gaviota Aspar Team Moto3 | 212 |
| | 3 | (Italy) Sky Racing Team VR46 | 206 |
| 1 | 4 | (Finland) Red Bull KTM Ajo | 200 |
| 1 | 5 | (Italy) Rivacold Snipers Team | 200 |

== Notes ==
| Previous race: 2020 Valencian Grand Prix | FIM Grand Prix World Championship; 2020 season | Next race: 2021 Qatar Grand Prix |
| Previous race: 2012 Portuguese Grand Prix | Portuguese motorcycle Grand Prix | Next race: 2021 Portuguese Grand Prix |
