= 2022 Qatar motorcycle Grand Prix =

First round of the 2022 Grand Prix motorcycle racing season

2022 Qatar Grand Prix
Race details
- Race 1 of 20 races in the 2022 Grand Prix motorcycle racing season
- Date: 6 March 2022
- Official name: Grand Prix of Qatar
- Location: Lusail International Circuit; Lusail, Qatar
- Course: Permanent racing facility; 5.380 km (3.343 mi)

MotoGP
Pole position
Rider	(Spain) Jorge Martín	Ducati
Time	1:53.011	
Fastest lap
Rider	(Italy) Enea Bastianini	Ducati
Time	1:54.338 on lap 17	
Podium
First	(Italy) Enea Bastianini	Ducati
Second	(South Africa) Brad Binder	KTM
Third	(Spain) Pol Espargaró	Honda

Moto2
Pole position
Rider	(Italy) Celestino Vietti	Kalex
Time	1:59.082	
Fastest lap
Rider	(Italy) Celestino Vietti	Kalex
Time	1:59.053 on lap 6	
Podium
First	(Italy) Celestino Vietti	Kalex
Second	(Spain) Arón Canet	Kalex
Third	(United Kingdom) Sam Lowes	Kalex

Moto3
Pole position
Rider	(Spain) Izan Guevara (Note: Guevara, who set the fastest time during qualifying, was penalized for irresponsible riding during the second qualifying session. He started the race from the back of the grid, but he is still credited with the pole position. Ayumu Sasaki was promoted to the pole position grid slot during the race.)	Gas Gas
Time	2:04.811	
Fastest lap
Rider	(Italy) Dennis Foggia	Honda
Time	2:05.561 on lap 12	
Podium
First	(Italy) Andrea Migno	Honda
Second	(Spain) Sergio García	Gas Gas
Third	(Japan) Kaito Toba	KTM

The 2022 Qatar motorcycle Grand Prix was the first round of the 2022 Grand Prix motorcycle racing season. It was held at the Lusail International Circuit in Lusail on 6 March 2022.

== Background ==
=== Entries ===
In MotoGP and Moto2 classes the riders and teams were the same as the season entry list with no additional stand-in riders for the race. In the premier class five drivers made their debuts in MotoGP: Remy Gardner and Raúl Fernández, respectively 2021 Moto2 World Champion and runner-up, Fabio di Giannantonio, Marco Bezzecchi and Darryn Binder, who moves from Moto3 to MotoGP as Jack Miller did in 2015. In the intermediate class, the new entries are the 2021 Moto3 World Champion Pedro Acosta, Jeremy Alcoba, Gabriel Rodrigo, Niccolò Antonelli, Filip Salač (from Moto 3), Manuel González, Alessandro Zaccone, Keminth Kubo, Zonta van den Goorbergh and Sean Dylan Kelly.

In Moto3, Taiyo Furusato missed the round after having surgery due to a right ankle injury; he was not replaced. Gerard Riu replaced David Muñoz due to the fact that the latter was under the minimum age. There are eight new entries in the category: Diogo Moreira, Iván Ortolá, Joel Kelso, Daniel Holgado, Matteo Bertelle, Mario Aji, Joshua Whatley and Scott Ogden.

As for the teams, in MotoGP class Aprilia enter the series with their own full factory team effort for the first time since 2004. Gresini Racing, had previously sponsored and supplied bikes with factory support by Aprilia, return as a fully-independent team with their bikes being supplied by Ducati. There are two teams debuting: VR46 Racing Team taking over the grid slots from Esponsorama Racing (who leaves the premier class after 10 seasons) and uses Ducati machinery; RNF MotoGP Racing replaces Sepang Racing Team, which abandoned racing after the decision of main sponsor Petronas to remove support. The team was formed by the management of the Sepang Racing Team and continue to use Yamaha bikes. In Moto2 class, Petronas SRT withdrew from the category, while RW Racing GP return to the series-dominant Kalex chassis, after four seasons operating the factory programme for Japanese chassis builder NTS. In Moto3 class, the vacancy left by Petronas SRT is occupied by the new VisionTrack Racing Team, which uses Honda bikes. Gresini Racing (present since the first year of Moto3) also leaves the light class to focus on MotoGP and Moto2. In its place another Italian team, Team MTA, already present in the Moto3 class as Team Italia from 2014 to 2016, and rides with KTM bikes. Prüstel GP switches from the current KTM motorcycles to CFMoto-rebranded KTM bikes.

== Free practice ==
=== MotoGP ===
In the first session Brad Binder was the fastest, followed by Takaaki Nakagami and Álex Rins. The latter finished in the lead in the second session ahead of Marc Márquez and Joan Mir. In the third session Enea Bastianini set the best time preceded by Pol Espargaró and Francesco Bagnaia. In the combined time classification, reigning world champion Fabio Quartararo does not rank in the top ten and is forced to unpack Q1.

== Qualifying ==
=== MotoGP ===
Fastest session lap

Pos.	No.	Biker	Constructor	Qualifying times		Final grid	Row
Pos.	No.	Biker	Constructor	Q1	Q2	Final grid	Row
1	89	(Spain) Jorge Martín	Ducati	Qualified in Q2	1:53.011	1	1
2	23	(Italy) Enea Bastianini	Ducati	Qualified in Q2	1:53.158	2	1
3	93	(Spain) Marc Márquez	Honda	Qualified in Q2	1:53.283	3	1
4	43	(Australia) Jack Miller	Ducati	Qualified in Q2	1:53.298	4	2
5	41	(Spain) Aleix Espargaró	Aprilia	Qualified in Q2	1:53.319	5	2
6	44	(Spain) Pol Espargaró	Honda	Qualified in Q2	1:53.346	6	2
7	33	(South Africa) Brad Binder	KTM	1:53.512	1:53.350	7	3
8	36	(Spain) Joan Mir	Suzuki	Qualified in Q2	1:53.407	8	3
9	63	(Italy) Francesco Bagnaia	Ducati	Qualified in Q2	1:53.411	9	3
10	42	(Spain) Álex Rins	Suzuki	Qualified in Q2	1:53.481	10	4
11	20	(France) Fabio Quartararo	Yamaha	1:53.654	1:53.635	11	4
12	21	(Italy) Franco Morbidelli	Yamaha	Qualified in Q2	1:53.982	12	4
13	5	(France) Johann Zarco	Ducati	1:53:780	N/A	13	5
14	88	(Portugal) Miguel Oliveira	KTM	1:53.819	N/A	14	5
15	72	(Italy) Marco Bezzecchi	Ducati	1:53.915	N/A	15	5
16	30	(Japan) Takaaki Nakagami	Honda	1:54.038	N/A	16	6
17	10	(Italy) Luca Marini	Ducati	1:54.222	N/A	17	6
18	73	(Spain) Álex Márquez	Honda	1:54.224	N/A	18	6
19	12	(Spain) Maverick Viñales	Aprilia	1:54.228	N/A	19	7
20	4	(Italy) Andrea Dovizioso	Yamaha	1:54.244	N/A	20	7
21	49	(Italy) Fabio Di Giannantonio	Ducati	1:54.276	N/A	21	7
22	87	(Australia) Remy Gardner	KTM	1:54.378	N/A	22	8
23	25	(Spain) Raúl Fernández	KTM	1:54.889	N/A	23	8
24	40	(South Africa) Darryn Binder	Yamaha	1:56.011	N/A	24	8
OFFICIAL MOTOGP QUALIFYING RESULTS

=== Moto2 ===
Fastest session lap

Pos.	No.	Biker	Constructor	Qualifying times		Final grid	Row
Pos.	No.	Biker	Constructor	Q1	Q2	Final grid	Row
1	13	(Italy) Celestino Vietti	Kalex	Qualified in Q2	1:59.082	1	1
2	14	(Italy) Tony Arbolino	Kalex	Qualified in Q2	1:59.194	2	1
3	22	(United Kingdom) Sam Lowes	Kalex	Qualified in Q2	1:59.226	3	1
4	12	(Czech Republic) Filip Salač	Kalex	Qualified in Q2	1:59.287	4	2
5	79	(Japan) Ai Ogura	Kalex	Qualified in Q2	1:59.302	5	2
6	37	(Spain) Augusto Fernández	Kalex	Qualified in Q2	1:59.339	6	2
7	96	(United Kingdom) Jake Dixon	Kalex	Qualified in Q2	1:59.357	7	3
8	54	(Spain) Fermín Aldeguer	Boscoscuro	1:59.690	1:59.359	8	3
9	40	(Spain) Arón Canet	Kalex	Qualified in Q2	1:59.480	9	3
10	51	(Spain) Pedro Acosta	Kalex	Qualified in Q2	1:59.528	10	4
11	6	(United States) Cameron Beaubier	Kalex	Qualified in Q2	1:59.551	11	4
12	9	(Spain) Jorge Navarro	Kalex	Qualified in Q2	1:59.626	12	4
13	23	(Germany) Marcel Schrötter	Kalex	Qualified in Q2	1:59.670	13	5
14	16	(United States) Joe Roberts	Kalex	Qualified in Q2	1:59.671	14	5
15	75	(Spain) Albert Arenas	Kalex	1:59.371	1:59.779	15	5
16	7	(Belgium) Barry Baltus	Kalex	1:59.879	1:59.833	16	6
17	64	(Netherlands) Bo Bendsneyder	Kalex	1:59.749	1:59.971	17	6
18	35	(Thailand) Somkiat Chantra	Kalex	Qualified in Q2	2:00.213	18	6
19	24	(Italy) Simone Corsi	MV Agusta	2:00.063	N/A	19	7
20	19	(Italy) Lorenzo Dalla Porta	Kalex	2:00.151	N/A	20	7
21	42	(Spain) Marcos Ramírez	MV Agusta	2:00.063	N/A	21	7
22	52	(Spain) Jeremy Alcoba	Kalex	2:00.270	N/A	22	8
23	2	(Argentina) Gabriel Rodrigo	Kalex	2:00.542	N/A	23	8
24	18	(Spain) Manuel González	Kalex	2:00.551	N/A	24	8
25	61	(Italy) Alessandro Zaccone	Kalex	2:00.957	N/A	25	9
26	81	(Thailand) Keminth Kubo	Kalex	2:01.033	N/A	26	9
27	5	(Italy) Romano Fenati	Boscoscuro	2:01.137	N/A	27	9
28	4	(United States) Sean Dylan Kelly	Kalex	2:01.201	N/A	28	10
29	84	(Netherlands) Zonta van den Goorbergh	Kalex	2:01.327	N/A	29	10
30	28	(Italy) Niccolò Antonelli	Kalex	2:01.874	N/A	30	10
OFFICIAL MOTOGP QUALIFYING RESULTS

== Classification ==
=== MotoGP ===
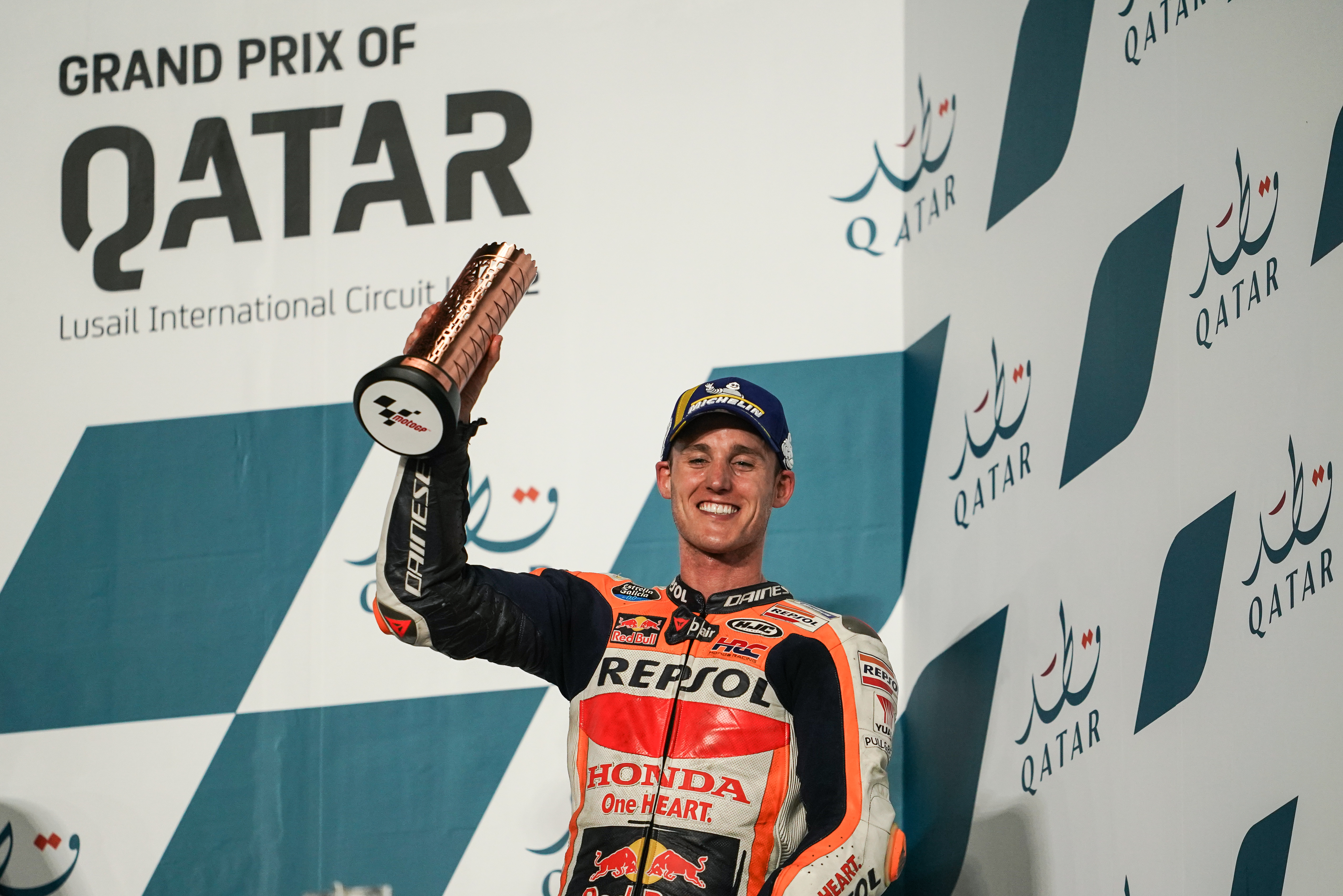
Pol Espargaró at the podium

Pos.	No.	Rider	Team	Manufacturer	Laps	Time/Retired	Grid	Points
1	23	(Italy) Enea Bastianini	Gresini Racing MotoGP	Ducati	22	42:13.198	2	25
2	33	(South Africa) Brad Binder	Red Bull KTM Factory Racing	KTM	22	+0.346	7	20
3	44	(Spain) Pol Espargaró	Repsol Honda Team	Honda	22	+1.351	6	16
4	41	(Spain) Aleix Espargaró	Aprilia Racing	Aprilia	22	+2.242	5	13
5	93	(Spain) Marc Márquez	Repsol Honda Team	Honda	22	+4.099	3	11
6	36	(Spain) Joan Mir	Team Suzuki Ecstar	Suzuki	22	+4.843	8	10
7	42	(Spain) Álex Rins	Team Suzuki Ecstar	Suzuki	22	+8.810	10	9
8	5	(France) Johann Zarco	Pramac Racing	Ducati	22	+10.536	13	8
9	20	(France) Fabio Quartararo	Monster Energy Yamaha MotoGP	Yamaha	22	+10.543	11	7
10	30	(Japan) Takaaki Nakagami	LCR Honda Idemitsu	Honda	22	+14.967	16	6
11	21	(Italy) Franco Morbidelli	Monster Energy Yamaha MotoGP	Yamaha	22	+16.712	12	5
12	12	(Spain) Maverick Viñales	Aprilia Racing	Aprilia	22	+23.216	19	4
13	10	(Italy) Luca Marini	Mooney VR46 Racing Team	Ducati	22	+27.283	17	3
14	4	(Italy) Andrea Dovizioso	WithU Yamaha RNF MotoGP Team	Yamaha	22	+27.374	20	2
15	87	(Australia) Remy Gardner	Tech3 KTM Factory Racing	KTM	22	+41.107	22	1
16	40	(South Africa) Darryn Binder	WithU Yamaha RNF MotoGP Team	Yamaha	22	+41.119	24	
17	49	(Italy) Fabio Di Giannantonio	Gresini Racing MotoGP	Ducati	22	+41.349	21	
18	25	(Spain) Raúl Fernández	Tech3 KTM Factory Racing	KTM	22	+42.357	23	
Ret	89	(Spain) Jorge Martín	Pramac Racing	Ducati	11	Collision	1	
Ret	63	(Italy) Francesco Bagnaia	Ducati Lenovo Team	Ducati	11	Collision	9	
Ret	88	(Portugal) Miguel Oliveira	Red Bull KTM Factory Racing	KTM	10	Accident	14	
Ret	73	(Spain) Álex Márquez	LCR Honda Castrol	Honda	9	Accident	18	
Ret	72	(Italy) Marco Bezzecchi	Mooney VR46 Racing Team	Ducati	6	Accident	15	
Ret	43	(Australia) Jack Miller	Ducati Lenovo Team	Ducati	6	Lost Power	4	

=== Moto2 ===
Pos.	No.	Rider	Manufacturer	Laps	Time/Retired	Grid	Points
1	13	(Italy) Celestino Vietti	Kalex	20	39:53.637	1	25
2	40	(Spain) Arón Canet	Kalex	20	+6.154	9	20
3	22	(United Kingdom) Sam Lowes	Kalex	20	+10.181	3	16
4	37	(Spain) Augusto Fernández	Kalex	20	+10.259	6	13
5	14	(Italy) Tony Arbolino	Kalex	20	+11.421	2	11
6	79	(Japan) Ai Ogura	Kalex	20	+12.331	5	10
7	9	(Spain) Jorge Navarro	Kalex	20	+14.866	12	9
8	16	(United States) Joe Roberts	Kalex	20	+15.371	14	8
9	6	(United States) Cameron Beaubier	Kalex	20	+17.368	11	7
10	23	(Germany) Marcel Schrötter	Kalex	20	+18.908	13	6
11	96	(United Kingdom) Jake Dixon	Kalex	20	+18.958	7	5
12	51	(Spain) Pedro Acosta	Kalex	20	+26.051	10	4
13	75	(Spain) Albert Arenas	Kalex	20	+26.139	15	3
14	52	(Spain) Jeremy Alcoba	Kalex	20	+31.755	21	2
15	5	(Italy) Romano Fenati	Boscoscuro	20	+33.639	26	1
16	54	(Spain) Fermín Aldeguer	Boscoscuro	20	+34.155	8	
17	42	(Spain) Marcos Ramírez	MV Agusta	20	+36.282	20	
18	24	(Italy) Simone Corsi	MV Agusta	20	+37.699 (Note: 3-second penalty.)	18	
19	64	(Netherlands) Bo Bendsneyder	Kalex	20	+40.594	17	
20	18	(Spain) Manuel González	Kalex	20	+43.946	23	
21	2	(Argentina) Gabriel Rodrigo	Kalex	20	+44.347	22	
22	61	(Italy) Alessandro Zaccone	Kalex	20	+49.180	24	
23	81	(Thailand) Keminth Kubo	Kalex	20	+50.203	25	
24	84	(Netherlands) Zonta van den Goorbergh	Kalex	20	+56.194	28	
25	4	(United States) Sean Dylan Kelly	Kalex	20	+56.336	27	
26	28	(Italy) Niccolò Antonelli	Kalex	20	+56.357	29	
Ret	7	(Belgium) Barry Baltus	Kalex	19	Accident	16	
Ret	19	(Italy) Lorenzo Dalla Porta	Kalex	15	Shoulder Pain	19	
Ret	12	(Czech Republic) Filip Salač	Kalex	2	Accident	4	
DNS	35	(Thailand) Somkiat Chantra	Kalex		Did not start		
OFFICIAL MOTO2 RACE REPORT

- Somkiat Chantra suffered a broken finger in a crash during qualifying and was declared unfit to compete.

=== Moto3 ===
Pos.	No.	Rider	Manufacturer	Laps	Time/Retired	Grid	Points
1	16	(Italy) Andrea Migno	Honda	18	37:59.522	3	25
2	11	(Spain) Sergio García	Gas Gas	18	+0.037	6	20
3	27	(Japan) Kaito Toba	KTM	18	+0.573	11	16
4	53	(Turkey) Deniz Öncü	KTM	18	+0.594	9	13
5	17	(United Kingdom) John McPhee	Husqvarna	18	+1.064	5	11
6	10	(Brazil) Diogo Moreira	KTM	18	+1.481	18	10
7	7	(Italy) Dennis Foggia	Honda	18	+1.951	28 (Note: Back of the grid start penalty.)	9
8	28	(Spain) Izan Guevara	Gas Gas	18	+2.545	27	8
9	6	(Japan) Ryusei Yamanaka	KTM	18	+2.742	4	7
10	43	(Spain) Xavier Artigas	CFMoto	18	+6.055	10	6
11	48	(Spain) Iván Ortolá	KTM	18	+6.080	7	5
12	54	(Italy) Riccardo Rossi	Honda	18	+12.933	13	4
13	82	(Italy) Stefano Nepa	KTM	18	+12.974	16	3
14	31	(Spain) Adrián Fernández	KTM	18	+12.989	20	2
15	66	(Australia) Joel Kelso	KTM	18	+13.084	14	1
16 (Note: 1-position penalty for exceeding track limits on the last lap.)	96	(Spain) Daniel Holgado	KTM	18	+12.999	12	
17	18	(Italy) Matteo Bertelle	KTM	18	+29.098	15	
18	23	(Italy) Elia Bartolini	KTM	18	+29.128	24	
19	64	(Indonesia) Mario Aji	Honda	18	+29.497	22	
20	22	(Spain) Ana Carrasco	KTM	18	+43.108	23	
21	87	(Spain) Gerard Riu	KTM	18	+47.964	25	
22	70	(United Kingdom) Joshua Whatley	Honda	18	+48.272	26	
Ret	71	(Japan) Ayumu Sasaki	Husqvarna	12	Loose Fairing	1	
Ret	5	(Spain) Jaume Masià	KTM	9	Accident	2	
Ret	67	(Italy) Alberto Surra	Honda	9	Mechanical	19	
Ret	19	(United Kingdom) Scott Ogden	Honda	6	Accident	17	
Ret	20	(France) Lorenzo Fellon	Honda	3	Collision	21	
Ret	24	(Japan) Tatsuki Suzuki	Honda	3	Accident Damage	29	
Ret	99	(Spain) Carlos Tatay	CFMoto	3	Accident Damage	8	
OFFICIAL MOTO3 RACE REPORT

== Championship standings after the race ==
Below are the standings for the top five riders, constructors, and teams after the round.

=== MotoGP ===
Riders' Championship standings

Pos.	Rider	Points
1	(Italy) Enea Bastianini	25
2	(South Africa) Brad Binder	20
3	(Spain) Pol Espargaró	16
4	(Spain) Aleix Espargaró	13
5	(Spain) Marc Márquez	11

Constructors' Championship standings

Pos.	Constructor	Points
1	(Italy) Ducati	25
2	(Austria) KTM	20
3	(Japan) Honda	16
4	(Italy) Aprilia	13
5	(Japan) Suzuki	10

Teams' Championship standings

Pos.	Team	Points
1	(Japan) Repsol Honda Team	27
2	(Italy) Gresini Racing MotoGP	25
3	(Austria) Red Bull KTM Factory Racing	20
4	(Japan) Team Suzuki Ecstar	19
5	(Italy) Aprilia Racing	17

=== Moto2 ===
Riders' Championship standings

Pos.	Rider	Points
1	(Italy) Celestino Vietti	25
2	(Spain) Arón Canet	20
3	(United Kingdom) Sam Lowes	16
4	(Spain) Augusto Fernández	13
5	(Italy) Tony Arbolino	11

Constructors' Championship standings

Pos.	Constructor	Points
1	(Germany) Kalex	25
2	(Italy) Boscoscuro	1

Teams' Championship standings

Pos.	Team	Points
1	(Spain) Flexbox HP40	29
2	(Belgium) Elf Marc VDS Racing Team	27
3	(Italy) Mooney VR46 Racing Team	25
4	(Finland) Red Bull KTM Ajo	17
5	(Japan) Idemitsu Honda Team Asia	10

=== Moto3 ===
Riders' Championship standings

Pos.	Rider	Points
1	(Italy) Andrea Migno	25
2	(Spain) Sergio García	20
3	(Japan) Kaito Toba	16
4	(Turkey) Deniz Öncü	13
5	(United Kingdom) John McPhee	11

Constructors' Championship standings

Pos.	Constructor	Points
1	(Japan) Honda	25
2	(Spain) Gas Gas	20
3	(Austria) KTM	16
4	(Sweden) Husqvarna	11
5	(China) CFMoto	6

Teams' Championship standings

Pos.	Team	Points
1	(Spain) Gaviota GasGas Aspar Team	28
2	(Italy) Rivacold Snipers Team	25
3	(France) CIP Green Power	17
4	(Spain) MT Helmets – MSI	17
5	(France) Red Bull KTM Tech3	15

== Notes ==
Previous race: 2021 Valencian Grand Prix	FIM Grand Prix World Championship; 2022 season	Next race: 2022 Indonesian Grand Prix
Previous race: 2021 Qatar Grand Prix	Qatar motorcycle Grand Prix	Next race: 2023 Qatar Grand Prix
