= Celestino Vietti =

Italian motorcycle racer

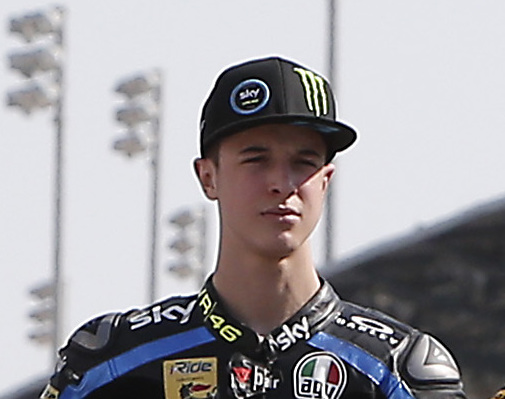
- Vietti in 2019
- Nationality: Italian
- Born: 13 October 2001 (age 25); Cirié, Italy
- Current team: Speed Up Racing
- Bike number: 13
Motorcycle racing career statistics
Moto2 World Championship
| Active years | 2021– |
| Manufacturers | Kalex, Boscoscuro |
| 2025 championship position | 7th (157 pts) |
Starts / Wins / Podiums / Poles / F. laps / Points; 113 / 8 / 17 / 8 / 10 / 838
Moto3 World Championship
| Active years | 2018–2020 |
| Manufacturers | KTM |
| Championships | 0 |
| 2020 championship position | 5th (146 pts) |
Starts / Wins / Podiums / Poles / F. laps / Points; 38 / 2 / 8 / 1 / 2 / 305

Celestino Vietti Ramus (born 13 October 2001) is an Italian motorcycle rider competing in Moto2 for Speed Up Racing. He is also a member of Valentino Rossi's VR46 Academy.

== Career ==
=== Junior career ===
In 2015, Vietti won the Italian Premoto3 250 4t championship, a CIV category in which he won seven out of eight races. On 15 December 2015, he joined the VR46 Academy, remaining in the CIV but moving up a category, moving to Moto3 for the 2016 season in the RMU Racing team. After a season in the CIV Moto3 where he finished 12th, in 2017 he made his debut in the CEV Junior World Championship with SKY Racing Team VR46 where he finished 25th.

In 2018, Vietti competed full-time in the 2018 FIM CEV Moto3 Junior World Championship, scoring a second place in Barcelona and finishing the season tenth overall, with 52 points.

=== Moto3 World Championship (2018–2020) ===
In 2018, Vietti graduated to the Moto3 World Championship where he replaced Enea Bastianini in the Estrella Galicia team.

Vietti made his Grand Prix racing debut as injury replacement for fellow VR46 Academy member Nicolò Bulega at the Japanese Grand Prix. A week later he scored his first career podium in Moto3 at Phillip Island, and finished off the season with a tenth place in Valencia. Vietti scored 24 points total, six more than Bulega, despite taking part in 14 races less.

Following his impressive debut performances, Vietti competed full-time in the 2019 Moto3 World Championship, with Bulega moving up to the Moto2 category. Vietti hit the ground running, scoring regular top-ten points at almost every weekend, grabbing three third places in Jerez, Barcelona, and Motegi, scoring 135 points total, finishing sixth overall in the championship standings, and winning rookie of the year.

Vietti started the 2020 Moto3 World Championship season well, with a third place in Jerez in the third race of the year, earning Vietti his fifth career podium in Moto3, all third places. A month later in Austria, Vietti scored his first victory in the category, followed by a second place in Misano, and another victory in France. Overall, Vietti closed a strong year with two victories, four podiums, 146 points, and a fifth place finish in the final standings, in his final year of Moto3.

=== Moto2 World Championship (2021–present) ===
==== VR 46 Racing Team (2021–2022) ====
Following Nicolò Bulega's performances, Vietti was promoted to Moto2 for the 2021 season, partnering Marco Bezzecchi at Sky Racing Team VR46. Vietti slowly improved as the season went on, with his three best results coming at the last three races of the year, fourth in Misano, sixth in Portimao, and fourth in Valencia. He finished the season with 89 points, good for 12th in the final standings, and third among rookies, behind Raúl Fernández, and Ai Ogura.

Vietti was partnered by Niccolò Antonelli at Mooney VR46 Racing team for the 2022 Moto2 World Championship.

==== Fantic Racing (2023) ====
In 2023, the VR46 Moto 2 team was absorbed by Fantic Racing, whom Vietti joined as a rider.

==== Red Bull KTM Ajo (2024) ====
In 2024, Vietti joined Red Bull KTM Ajo. He finished in seventh place at the end of the season, with three wins and one podium. During the 2024 season, Vietti suffered three collarbone fractures, resulting in multiple races where he was unable to compete. Despite this, he was able to secure a win in Malaysia, resulting in his third win of the year, following victories at Red Bull Ring and San Marino.

==== Speed Up Racing (2025–2026) ====
From 2025, Vietti joined Speed Up Racing with Alonso López as a teammate. In the Thailand Grand Prix, during the race, Vietti was taken out by Senna Agius, after a strong qualifying session, ultimately resulting in a DNF. In the Grand Prix of Argentina, he finished on the podium in third position. During the Grand Prix of the Americas (COTA), Vietti struggled and qualified in 18th. However, during the race he was impressive, moving up to fourth before ultimately crashing out, two laps before the end of the race.

Vietti struggled to adapt to the Boscoscuro chassis throughout the 2025 season, having ridden all his Moto2 career on Kalex chassis to date. However, he was able to achieve a third-place finish in Austria at the Red Bull Ring; his first podium since Argentina. His only win of the season came at the Red Bull Grand Prix of Rimini and San Marino, where he achieved a dominant victory.

Vietti ultimately finished seventh in the 2025 Moto2 World Championship. In 2026, he continued with Speed RS Racing Team.

==== CF Moto Aspar Team (2027) ====
For 2027, Vietti will switch to the Aspar Team, partnering Máximo Quiles.

=== MotoGP World Championship (2025) ===
==== Pertamina Enduro VR 46 Racing Team (2025 testing) ====
Vietti made his MotoGP debut with the Pertamina Enduro VR46 Racing Team at the Valencia Test as a replacement for Franco Morbidelli who suffered an injury during the race at the last round in Valencia. He rode a Ducati Desmosedici GP24 and completed around 24 laps.

== Career statistics ==
=== CIV PreMoto3 Championship ===
==== Races by year ====
(key)

| Year | Bike | Pos | Pts |
| 2015 | RMU | 1st | 241 |

=== FIM CEV Moto3 Junior World Championship ===
==== Races by year ====
(key) (Races in bold indicate pole position, races in italics indicate fastest lap)

| Year | Bike | 1 | 2 | 3 | 4 | 5 | 6 | 7 | 8 | 9 | 10 | 11 | 12 | Pos | Pts |
|---|---|---|---|---|---|---|---|---|---|---|---|---|---|---|---|
| 2016 | KTM | VAL1 | VAL2 | LMS | ARA | CAT1 | CAT2 | ALB | ALG | JER1 | JER2 | VAL1; 9 | VAL2; 14 | 25th | 9 |
| 2017 | KTM | ALB; DNQ | LMS; 30 | CAT1; 11 | CAT2; 10 | VAL1; 13 | VAL2; 15 | EST; Ret | JER1; 35 | JER1; 21 | ARA; Ret | VAL1; Ret | VAL2; Ret | 25th | 15 |
| 2018 | KTM | EST | VAL1; Ret | VAL2; Ret | FRA; Ret | CAT1; 13 | CAT2; 2 | ARA; 5 | JER1 | JER2 | ALB; 29 | VAL1; 7 | VAL2; 7 | 10th | 52 |

=== Grand Prix motorcycle racing ===
==== By season ====
| Season | Class | Motorcycle | Team | Race | Win | Podium | Pole | FLap | Pts | Plcd |
|---|---|---|---|---|---|---|---|---|---|---|
| 2018 | Moto3 | KTM | Sky Racing Team VR46 | 4 | 0 | 1 | 0 | 0 | 24 | 25th |
| 2019 | Moto3 | KTM | Sky Racing Team VR46 | 19 | 0 | 3 | 1 | 1 | 135 | 6th |
| 2020 | Moto3 | KTM | Sky Racing Team VR46 | 15 | 2 | 4 | 0 | 1 | 146 | 5th |
| 2021 | Moto2 | Kalex | Sky Racing Team VR46 | 18 | 0 | 0 | 0 | 0 | 89 | 12th |
| 2022 | Moto2 | Kalex | Mooney VR46 Racing Team | 20 | 3 | 5 | 3 | 4 | 165 | 7th |
| 2023 | Moto2 | Kalex | Fantic Racing | 17 | 1 | 2 | 2 | 1 | 116 | 10th |
| 2024 | Moto2 | Kalex | Red Bull KTM Ajo | 17 | 3 | 4 | 2 | 3 | 165 | 7th |
| 2025 | Moto2 | Boscoscuro | SpeedRS Team | 22 | 1 | 3 | 0 | 0 | 157 | 7th |
| 2026 | Moto2 | Boscoscuro | SpeedRS Team | 19 | 0 | 3 | 1 | 2 | 146* | 8th* |
| Total | | | | **151** | **10** | **25** | **9** | **12** | **1143** | |

==== By class ====
| Class | Seasons | 1st GP | 1st pod | 1st win | Race | Win | Podiums | Pole | FLap | Pts | WChmp |
|---|---|---|---|---|---|---|---|---|---|---|---|
| Moto3 | 2018–2020 | 2018 Japan | 2018 Australia | 2020 Styria | 38 | 2 | 8 | 1 | 2 | 305 | 0 |
| Moto2 | 2021–present | 2021 Qatar | 2022 Qatar | 2022 Qatar | 113 | 8 | 17 | 8 | 10 | 838 | 0 |
| Total | 2018–present | | | | **151** | **10** | **25** | **9** | **12** | **1143** | **0** |

==== Races by year ====
(key) (Races in bold indicate pole position, races in italics indicate fastest lap)

| Year | Class | Bike | 1 | 2 | 3 | 4 | 5 | 6 | 7 | 8 | 9 | 10 | 11 | 12 | 13 | 14 | 15 | 16 | 17 | 18 | 19 | 20 | 21 | 22 | Pos | Pts |
|---|---|---|---|---|---|---|---|---|---|---|---|---|---|---|---|---|---|---|---|---|---|---|---|---|---|---|
| 2018 | Moto3 | KTM | QAT | ARG | AME | SPA | FRA | ITA | CAT | NED | GER | CZE | AUT | GBR | RSM | ARA | THA | JPN; 14 | AUS; 3 | MAL; Ret | VAL; 10 | | | | 25th | 24 |
| 2019 | Moto3 | KTM | QAT; 5 | ARG; 14 | AME; 9 | SPA; 3 | FRA; 7 | ITA; 9 | CAT; 3 | NED; Ret | GER; Ret | CZE; 19 | AUT; 4 | GBR; 9 | RSM; Ret | ARA; 14 | **THA**; 6 | JPN; 3 | AUS; Ret | MAL; 5 | VAL; 8 | | | | 6th | 135 |
| 2020 | Moto3 | KTM | QAT; 28 | SPA; 5 | ANC; 3 | CZE; 13 | AUT; 5 | STY; 1 | RSM; Ret | EMI; 2 | CAT; 8 | FRA; 1 | ARA; 9 | TER; 5 | EUR; 23 | VAL; 24 | POR; 7 | | | | | | | | 5th | 146 |
| 2021 | Moto2 | Kalex | QAT; 12 | DOH; 7 | POR; Ret | SPA; 18 | FRA; 19 | ITA; 16 | CAT; 14 | GER; 15 | NED; 10 | STY; 6 | AUT; 6 | GBR; 12 | ARA; 15 | RSM; 10 | AME; Ret | EMI; 4 | ALR; 6 | VAL; 4 | | | | | 12th | 89 |
| 2022 | Moto2 | Kalex | **QAT**; 1 | INA; 2 | ARG; 1 | AME; Ret | POR; 2 | SPA; 6 | FRA; 8 | ITA; Ret | **CAT**; 1 | GER; Ret | NED; 4 | GBR; 6 | AUT; Ret | **RSM**; Ret | ARA; 10 | JPN; Ret | THA; 10^{‡} | AUS; Ret | MAL; Ret | VAL; Ret | | | 7th | 165 |
| 2023 | Moto2 | Kalex | POR; 11 | ARG; 13 | **AME**; 9 | SPA; Ret | FRA; 4 | ITA; 5 | GER; 10 | NED; 10 | GBR; 12 | AUT; 1 | CAT; 10 | **RSM**; 2 | IND; DNS | JPN | INA | AUS; Ret | THA; Ret | MAL; Ret | QAT; 6 | VAL; Ret | | | 10th | 116 |
| 2024 | Moto2 | Kalex | QAT; 9 | POR; 7 | AME; 10 | SPA; 9 | FRA | CAT; Ret | ITA; 7 | NED; 10 | **GER**; 5 | GBR; 3 | **AUT**; 1 | ARA; 10 | RSM; Ret | EMI; 1 | INA; 12 | JPN; 7 | AUS; DNS | THA | MAL; 1 | SLD; Ret | | | 7th | 165 |
| 2025 | Moto2 | Boscoscuro | THA; Ret | ARG; 3 | AME; 20 | QAT; 7 | SPA; 7 | FRA; 8 | GBR; 6 | ARA; 18 | ITA; 5 | NED; 11 | GER; 5 | CZE; 5 | AUT; 3 | HUN; Ret | CAT; 6 | RSM; 1 | JPN; Ret | INA; Ret | AUS; 19 | MAL; 11 | POR; 13 | VAL; 8 | 7th | 157 |
| 2026 | Moto2 | Boscoscuro | THA; 6^{‡} | BRA; 9 | USA; 2 | SPA; 5 | FRA; 6 | **CAT**; 2 | ITA; 2 | HUN; 7 | CZE; 9 | NED; Ret | GER; Ret | GBR; 13 | ARA; 14 | RSM; 7 | AUT; 23 | JPN; 6 | INA; Ret | AUS; C | MAL; 9 | QAT; 10 | POR | VAL | 8th* | 146* |

^{‡} Half points awarded as less than two thirds (2022 Thailand GP)/less than half (2026 Thailand GP) of the race distance (but at least three full laps) was completed.
* Season still in progress.
