= Fantic Racing =

Italian motorcycle racing team

- 2026 name: Reds Fantic Racing
- Base: Italy
- Principal: Stefano Bedon
- Rider(s): Moto2: 7. Barry Baltus; 14. Tony Arbolino
- Motorcycle: Kalex Moto2
- Tyres: Pirelli
- Riders' Championships: –
- Teams' Championships: 1; 2025

Fantic Racing is a motorcycle racing team competing in the Moto2 World Championship.

== History ==
=== Grand Prix motorcycle ===
In the 2005 season, Fantic competed in the 250cc championship as Scuderia Fantic Motor GP.

=== MotoGP 250cc class ===
Fantic Motor is a new entry in the 2005 250cc world championship, Arnaud Vincent be a rider.

=== Moto2 ===
==== 2023 ====
In the 2023 season, Fantic Motor competes in the Moto2 world championship but is the main sponsor of the VR46 Racing Team with its two riders, Celestino Vietti and Borja Gómez.

== Results ==
(key) (Races in bold indicate pole position; races in italics indicate fastest lap)

Season	Class	Team	Motorcycle	Tyre	No.	Rider	1	2	3	4	5	6	7	8	9	10	11	12	13	14	15	16	Pos.	Point
2005	250cc	Scuderia Fantic Motor GP	Yamaha-Suter 250	**D**	20	(Italy) Gabriele Ferro	SPA; DNQ	POR; 13	CHN	FRA; DNQ	ITA; DNQ	CAT; 21	NED; DNQ	GBR; 18	GER; DNQ	CZE; DNQ	JPN; DNQ	MAL; DNQ	QAT; DNQ	AUS; DNQ	TUR; DNQ	VAL; DNQ	NC	0
2005	250cc	Scuderia Fantic Motor GP	Yamaha-Suter 250	**D**	21	(France) Arnaud Vincent	SPA; Ret	POR; Ret	CHN	FRA; DNQ	ITA; Ret	CAT; Ret	NED; 24	GBR; Ret	GER; Ret	CZE; 18	JPN; Ret	MAL; Ret	QAT; Ret	AUS; Ret	TUR; Ret	VAL; Ret	NC	0

Year	Class	Team name	Motorcycle	No.	Riders	Races	Wins	Podiums	Poles	F. laps	Points	Pos.
2023	Moto2	Fantic Racing	Kalex Moto2	13	(Italy) Celestino Vietti	17	1	2	2	1	116	10th
2023	Moto2	Fantic Racing	Kalex Moto2	72	(Spain) Borja Gómez	13	0	0	0	0	0	30th
2023	Moto2	Fantic Racing	Kalex Moto2	9	(Italy) Mattia Casadei	7	0	0	0	0	0	40th
2023	Moto2	Fantic Racing	Kalex Moto2	43	(Italy) Lorenzo Baldassarri	1	0	0	0	0	0	45th
2024	Moto2	Fantic Racing	Kalex Moto2	20	(Andorra) Xavi Cardelús	18	0	0	0	0	0	31st
2024	Moto2	Fantic Racing	Kalex Moto2	44	(Spain) Arón Canet	19	4	8	6	6	234	2nd
2024	Moto2	Fantic Racing	Kalex Moto2	31	(Spain) Roberto García	1	0	0	0	0	0	NC
2024	Moto2	Fantic Racing	Kalex Moto2	31	(Spain) Roberto García	1	0	0	0	0	0	NC
2025	Moto2	Fantic Racing Lino Sonego	Kalex Moto2	7	(Belgium) Barry Baltus	22	0	7	1	2	232	3rd
2025	Moto2	Fantic Racing Lino Sonego	Kalex Moto2	44	(Spain) Arón Canet	22	1	6	1	0	227	4th
2025	Moto2	Fantic Racing Redemption	Kalex Moto2	54	(Italy) Mattia Pasini	2	0	0	0	0	0	37th
2026	Moto2	Reds Fantic Racing	Kalex Moto2	7	(Belgium) Barry Baltus	16	0	1	0	0	61*	14th*
2026	Moto2	Reds Fantic Racing	Kalex Moto2	9	(Spain) Jorge Navarro	2	0	0	0	0	0*	31st*
2026	Moto2	Reds Fantic Racing	Kalex Moto2	14	(Italy) Tony Arbolino	19	0	1	1	0	82.5*	13th*

Key
Regular rider
Replacement rider
Wildcard rider
Replacement/wildcard rider

=== By season ===
(key) (Races in bold indicate pole position; races in italics indicate fastest lap)

Year	Motorcycle	Tyres	Riders	1	2	3	4	5	6	7	8	9	10	11	12	13	14	15	16	17	18	19	20	21	22	Points	RC	Points	TC	Points	MC
2023	Kalex Moto2	D		POR	ARG	AME	SPA	FRA	ITA	GER	NED	GBR	AUT	CAT	RSM	IND	JPN	INA	AUS	THA	MAL	QAT	VAL								
2023	Kalex Moto2	D	(Italy) Celestino Vietti	11	13	**9**	Ret	4	5	10	10	12	1	10	**2**	DNS			Ret	Ret	Ret	6	Ret			116	10th	116	10th	462.5	1st
2023	Kalex Moto2	D	(Spain) Borja Gómez	17	21	20	19	23	17	DNS	Ret	Ret	16	20	18	16	24									0	27th	116	10th	462.5	1st
2023	Kalex Moto2	D	(Italy) Mattia Casadei														26	24	Ret	21	21	26	25			0	40th	116	10th	462.5	1st
2023	Kalex Moto2	D	(Italy) Lorenzo Baldassarri															23								0	42nd	116	10th	462.5	1st
2024	Kalex Moto2	P		QAT	POR	AME	SPA	FRA	CAT	ITA	NED	GER	GBR	AUT	ARA	RSM	EMI	INA	JPN	AUS	THA	MAL	SLD								
2024	Kalex Moto2	P	(Andorra) Xavi Cardelús	23	Ret	26	17	21	16	23	DNS		Ret	26	22	27	23	Ret	25	20	20	21	23			0	31st	234	7th	437	1st
2024	Kalex Moto2	P	(Spain) Arón Canet	**10**	1	**9**	DNS	**6**	Ret	6	Ret	Ret	2	4	Ret	2	**2**	**1**	16	2	1	8	**1**			234	2nd	234	7th	437	1st
2024	Kalex Moto2	P	(Spain) Roberto García									Ret											Ret			0	NC	234	7th	437	1st
2025	Kalex Moto2	P		THA	ARG	AME	QAT	SPA	FRA	GBR	ARA	ITA	NED	GER	CZE	AUT	HUN	CAT	RSM	JPN	INA	AUS	MAL	POR	VAL						
2025	Kalex Moto2	P	(Belgium) Barry Baltus	6	12	7	6	2	2	Ret	3	11	Ret	2	**2**	7	12	10	2	7	4	6	3	5	Ret	232	3rd	459	1st	518	1st
2025	Kalex Moto2	P	(Spain) Arón Canet	2	4	4	1	8	3	**4**	6	3	2	7	Ret	10	6	Ret	7	15	3	9	15	4	15	227	4th	459	1st	518	1st
2025	Kalex Moto2	P	(Italy) Mattia Pasini												Ret	22										0	37th	459	1st	518	1st
2026	Kalex Moto2	P		THA	BRA	AME	QAT	SPA	FRA	CAT	ITA	HUN	CZE	NED	GER	GBR	ARA	RSM	AUT	JPN	INA	AUS	MAL	POR	VAL						
2026	Kalex Moto2	P	(Belgium) Barry Baltus	14	14	**6**	Ret	Ret	13	8	12	DNS			9	15	3	8	16	18	C	17	15			61*	14th*	143.5*	10th*	442.5*	1st
2026	Kalex Moto2	P	(Italy) Tony Arbolino	13	7	10	8	14	17	11	10	19	11	16	Ret	16	5	14	2	9	C	16	18			82.5*	13th*	143.5*	10th*	442.5*	1st
2026	Kalex Moto2	P	(Spain) Jorge Navarro										25	18												0*	31st*	143.5*	10th*	442.5*	1st

* Season still in progress.
