= 2025 Moto2 World Championship =

16th running of the Moto2 World Championship

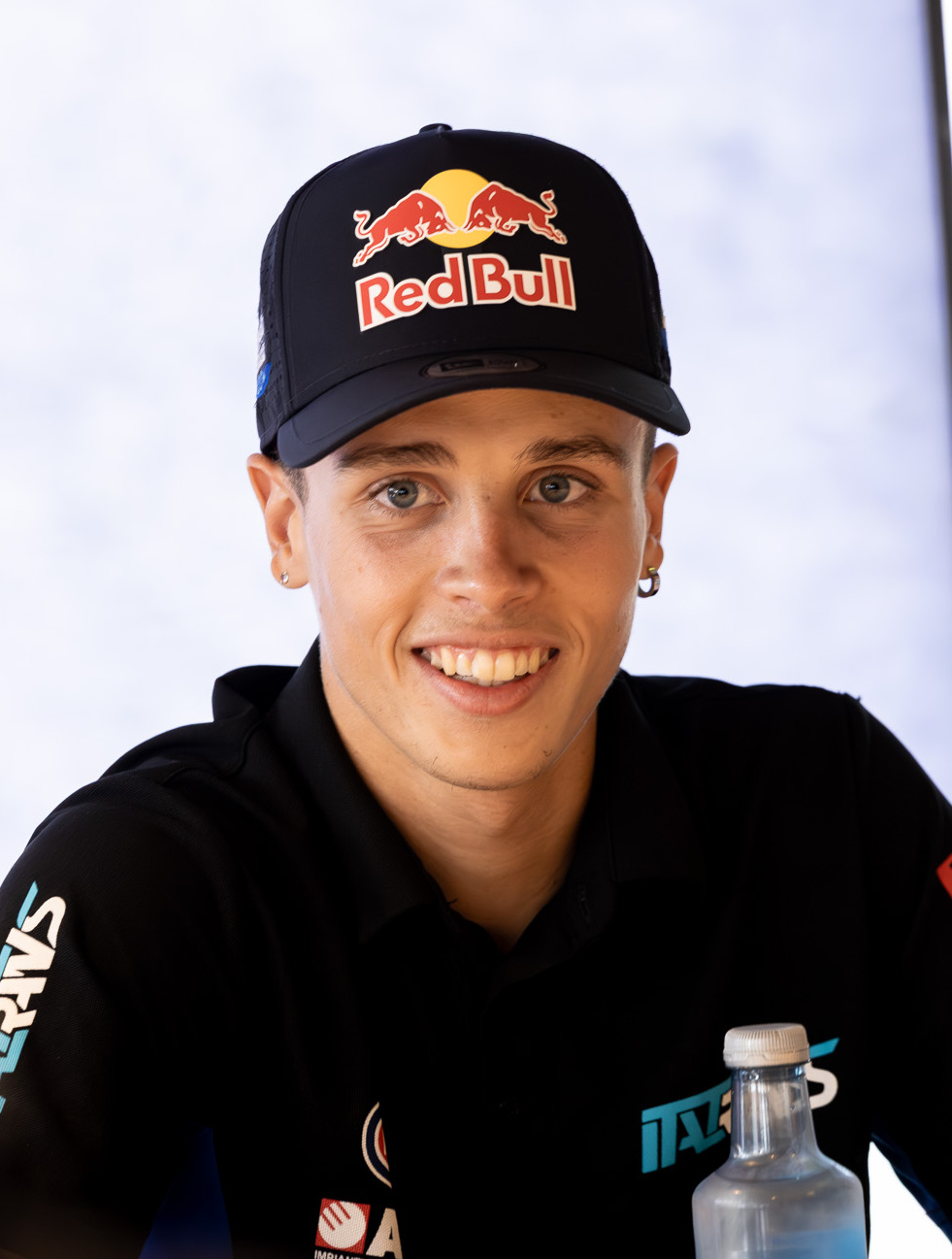
Diogo Moreira was the 2025 Moto2 World Riders' Champion.

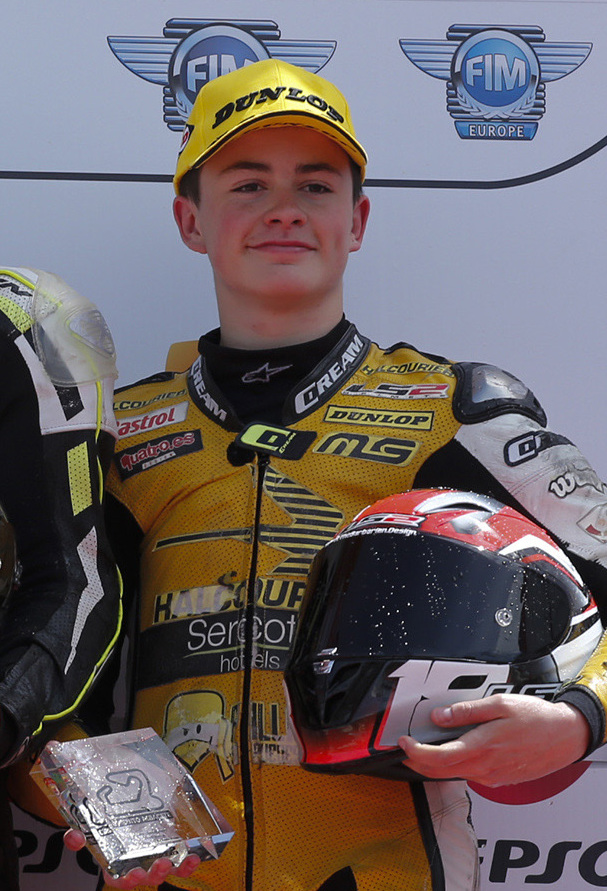
Manuel González (pictured in 2017) finished runner-up.

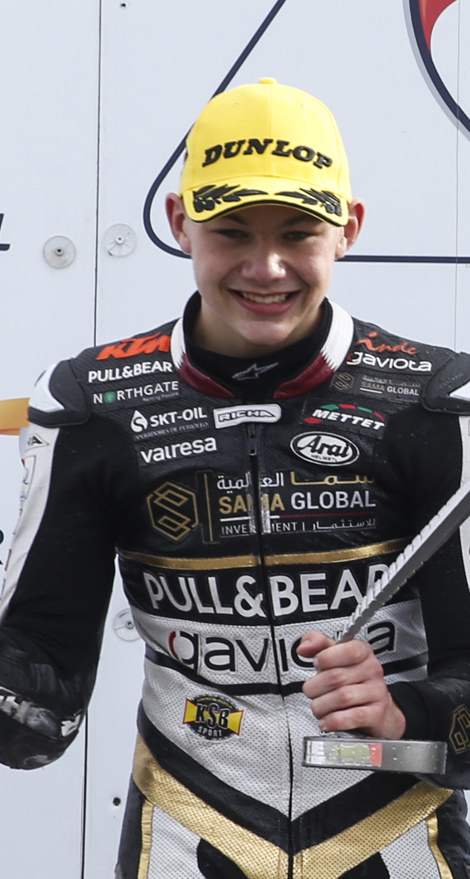
Barry Baltus (pictured in 2019) finished third.

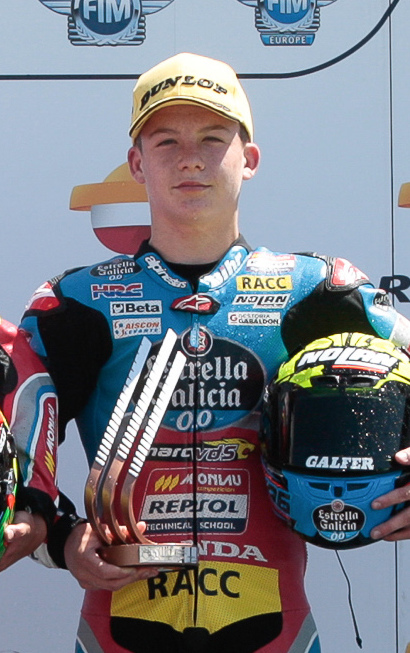
Daniel Holgado (pictured in 2019), the 2025 Moto2 Rookie of the Year.

The 2025 FIM Moto2 World Championship was the intermediate class of the 77th Fédération Internationale de Motocyclisme (FIM) Road Racing World Championship season. Diogo Moreira won the championship for Italtrans Racing Team after the Valencian Grand Prix. He became the first Brazilian rider to win World Championship in Grand Prix motorcycle racing history.

== Teams and riders ==
Team	Constructor	Motorcycle	No.	Rider	Rounds
(Italy) Blu Cru Pramac Yamaha Moto2	Boscoscuro	B-25	14	(Italy) Tony Arbolino	All
(Italy) Blu Cru Pramac Yamaha Moto2	Boscoscuro	B-25	28	(Spain) Izan Guevara	All
(Belgium) Elf Marc VDS Racing Team	Boscoscuro	B-25	12	(Czech Republic) Filip Salač	All
(Belgium) Elf Marc VDS Racing Team	Boscoscuro	B-25	96	(United Kingdom) Jake Dixon	All
(Spain) QJMotor – Frinsa – MSi	Boscoscuro	B-25	3	(Spain) Sergio García	4–8
(Spain) QJMotor – Frinsa – MSi	Boscoscuro	B-25	66	(Spain) Óscar Gutiérrez	1–3
(Spain) QJMotor – Frinsa – MSi	Boscoscuro	B-25	61	(Spain) Eric Fernández	9–12, 21–22
(Spain) QJMotor – Frinsa – MSi	Boscoscuro	B-25	19	(Spain) Unai Orradre	13–18
(Spain) QJMotor – Frinsa – MSi	Boscoscuro	B-25	29	(Australia) Harrison Voight	19–20
(Spain) QJMotor – Frinsa – MSi	Boscoscuro	B-25	4	(Spain) Iván Ortolá	All
(Italy) SpeedRS Team (Note: This is the team name entered in the championship. Other team names used during the season are Team HDR Heidrun (rounds 1–4), Beta Tools SpeedRS Team (rounds 5, 7–9, 15–19, 21), Folladore SpeedRS Team (rounds 6, 10–11), and Sync SpeedRS Team (rounds 12–14, 20, 22). Wildcard Alberto Ferrández used the team name Beta Tools – Boscoscuro during round 16.)	Boscoscuro	B-25	13	(Italy) Celestino Vietti	All
(Italy) SpeedRS Team	Boscoscuro	B-25	21	(Spain) Alonso López	All
(Italy) SpeedRS Team	Boscoscuro	B-25	93	(Spain) Alberto Ferrández	16
(Spain) FAU55 Racing	Boscoscuro	B-25	61	(Spain) Eric Fernández	15
(Switzerland) Klint Forward Factory Team	Forward	F2	9	(Spain) Jorge Navarro	All
(Switzerland) Klint Forward Factory Team	Forward	F2	11	(Spain) Álex Escrig	1–5, 8–22
(Switzerland) Klint Forward Factory Team	Forward	F2	17	(Spain) Daniel Muñoz	6–7
(Spain) CFMoto Aspar Team (Note: This is the team name entered in the championship. Other team names used during the season are CFMoto Inde Aspar Team (rounds 1–2, 4, 6, 8, 10–14, 16, 21–22), CFMoto Power Electronics Aspar Team (rounds 3, 17–19), CFMoto Gaviota Aspar Team (rounds 5, 7), CFMoto European Privilege Aspar Team (round 9), CFMoto Impulse Aspar Team (round 15), and CFMoto RCB Aspar Team (round 20).)	Kalex	Moto2	27	(Spain) Daniel Holgado	All
(Spain) CFMoto Aspar Team	Kalex	Moto2	80	(Colombia) David Alonso	All
(Italy) Fantic Racing (Note: For rounds 1–16, the team used the name Fantic Racing Lino Sonego. Wildcard Mattia Pasini used the team name Fantic Racing Redemption during rounds 12–13, while wildcard Alessandro Morosi used the team name Fantic Racing Eagle-1 during round 21.)	Kalex	Moto2	7	(Belgium) Barry Baltus	All
(Italy) Fantic Racing	Kalex	Moto2	44	(Spain) Arón Canet	All
(Italy) Fantic Racing	Kalex	Moto2	54	(Italy) Mattia Pasini	12–13
(Italy) Fantic Racing	Kalex	Moto2	91	(Italy) Alessandro Morosi	21
(Japan) Idemitsu Honda Team Asia	Kalex	Moto2	64	(Indonesia) Mario Aji	1–5, 7, 15–22
(Japan) Idemitsu Honda Team Asia	Kalex	Moto2	41	(Thailand) Nakarin Atiratphuvapat	8–10, 13–14
(Japan) Idemitsu Honda Team Asia	Kalex	Moto2	23	(Japan) Taiga Hada	11–12
(Japan) Idemitsu Honda Team Asia	Kalex	Moto2	92	(Japan) Yuki Kunii	All
(Italy) Italjet Gresini Moto2	Kalex	Moto2	15	(South Africa) Darryn Binder	1–6, 8–20
(Italy) Italjet Gresini Moto2	Kalex	Moto2	3	(Spain) Sergio García	21–22
(Italy) Italjet Gresini Moto2	Kalex	Moto2	75	(Spain) Albert Arenas	All
(Italy) Italtrans Racing Team	Kalex	Moto2	10	(Brazil) Diogo Moreira	All
(Italy) Italtrans Racing Team	Kalex	Moto2	99	(Spain) Adrián Huertas	1–6, 8–22
(Germany) Liqui Moly Dynavolt Intact GP	Kalex	Moto2	18	(Spain) Manuel González	All
(Germany) Liqui Moly Dynavolt Intact GP	Kalex	Moto2	81	(Australia) Senna Agius	1–13, 15–22
(Germany) Liqui Moly Dynavolt Intact GP	Kalex	Moto2	3	(Spain) Sergio García	14
(United States) OnlyFans American Racing Team (Note: Wildcard Alberto Surra used the team name Andifer ART during round 16.)	Kalex	Moto2	16	(United States) Joe Roberts	1–20
(United States) OnlyFans American Racing Team	Kalex	Moto2	85	(Spain) Xabi Zurutuza	21–22
(United States) OnlyFans American Racing Team	Kalex	Moto2	24	(Spain) Marcos Ramírez	All
(United States) OnlyFans American Racing Team	Kalex	Moto2	67	(Italy) Alberto Surra	16
(Finland) Red Bull KTM Ajo	Kalex	Moto2	53	(Turkey) Deniz Öncü	1–12
(Finland) Red Bull KTM Ajo	Kalex	Moto2	17	(Spain) Daniel Muñoz	13–22
(Finland) Red Bull KTM Ajo	Kalex	Moto2	95	(Netherlands) Collin Veijer	1–6, 9–22
(Finland) Red Bull KTM Ajo	Kalex	Moto2	17	(Spain) Daniel Muñoz	8
(Netherlands) RW-Idrofoglia Racing GP	Kalex	Moto2	71	(Japan) Ayumu Sasaki	All
(Netherlands) RW-Idrofoglia Racing GP	Kalex	Moto2	84	(Netherlands) Zonta van den Goorbergh	All
(Malaysia) Petronas MIE Racing RW	Kalex	Moto2	20	(Malaysia) Azroy Anuar	20
(Malaysia) Petronas MIE Racing RW	Kalex	Moto2	55	(Malaysia) Helmi Azman	20
(Spain) AGR Team Fusport	Kalex	Moto2	40	(Poland) Milan Pawelec	12
(Netherlands) RW NTS Idrofoglia	NTS	NH7	22	(Spain) Héctor Garzó	22

Key
Regular rider
Replacement rider
Wildcard rider

All teams used series-specified Pirelli tyres and Triumph 765cc 3-cylinder engines.

=== Team changes ===
- Yamaha VR46 Master Camp Team left the championship after Yamaha and VR46 ended their three-year partnership. They were replaced by Blu Cru Pramac Yamaha Moto2, which opted to run the Boscoscuro chassis instead of the Kalex.
- Elf Marc VDS Racing Team ended their 13-year partnership with Kalex and also switched to Boscoscuro.
- Pertamina Mandalika SAG Team withdrew from the Moto2 world championship after fifteen seasons. No official statement was made.

=== Rider changes ===
- David Alonso, 2024 Moto3 World Champion, made his intermediate class debut with the CFMoto Aspar Team. He was joined by Daniel Holgado, who finished second to Alonso in 2024.
- Collin Veijer made his intermediate class debut with Red Bull KTM Ajo, replacing Celestino Vietti, who switched to Speed Up Racing, replacing Fermín Aldeguer, who stepped up to the premier class with Gresini Racing.
- Jake Dixon left the CFMoto Aspar Team to join forces with Elf Marc VDS Racing, replacing Tony Arbolino, who linked up with the Pramac Yamaha Moto2 Team. He was paired up with Izan Guevara, who also left the CFMoto Aspar Team after two seasons.
- Jeremy Alcoba left the championship to join the Supersport World Championship.
- Darryn Binder left Liqui Moly Dynavolt Intact GP after two seasons to join Gresini Racing, switching teams with Manuel González, who joined Liqui Moly Dynavolt Intact GP in place of Binder.
- Adrián Huertas, 2024 Supersport World Championship champion, made his Grand Prix debut with Italtrans Racing this season. He replaced Dennis Foggia, who returned to Moto3 with the CFMoto Aspar Team.
- Ayumu Sasaki moved to RW-Idrofoglia Racing GP on a new two-year deal, replacing Barry Baltus, who joined Fantic Racing, taking over the seat from Xavier Cardelús, who left for the Supersport World Championship.
- Iván Ortolá made his intermediate class debut with MT Helmets-MSi, replacing 2024 Moto2 World Champion Ai Ogura, who stepped up to the premier class with Trackhouse Racing.
- Yuki Kunii returned to the world championship, making his intermediate class debut with Idemitsu Honda Team Asia, replacing Somkiat Chantra, who stepped up to the premier class with LCR Honda.
- Jorge Navarro made his full-time return to the intermediate class for the first time since 2022, replacing Xavier Artigas at Forward Racing.

==== Mid-season changes ====
- Sergio García missed the Thailand, Argentina and Americas rounds following an injury sustained during the official pre-season tests in Jerez. He was replaced by MotoE rider Óscar Gutiérrez. After only eight rounds, MSi announced both ends had mutually agreed to part ways with immediate effect. Eric Fernández, Moto2 European Championship rider, will take his place from the Italian round onwards.
- Álex Escrig and Mario Aji missed the French round due to injuries sustained previously. Escrig was replaced by Daniel Muñoz for the next two rounds, while Aji was not replaced at Le Mans. Escrig was diagnosed with a hemothorax injury and Aji injured his shoulder at Jerez.
- Three riders missed the Silverstone round due to injuries: Darryn Binder injured the ulna on his left arm at the previous round in Le Mans, Adrián Huertas injured his left collarbone due to an incident involved at the French round and Collin Veijer injured his arm while training. The mentioned riders were not replaced at the British GP, but in the case of Veijer, he was replaced by Daniel Muñoz at the next round at Aragon.
- Nakarin Atiratphuvapat made his Moto2 return as a replacement for the injured Mario Aji for the next rounds starting at the Aragon GP, due to a dislocation on the shoulder for the Indonesian rider, but for the rounds in Sachsenring and Brno, there was another return, in the case of Taiga Hada as a replacement for Aji. Then, the Thailand rider returned for the next rounds at Austria and Hungary, and Aji returned for the next round at Barcelona.
- Unai Orradre will race for the remainder of the season, taking the ride of the Boscoscuro's MSi Team, starting from the Austrian GP, as a replacement for Eric Fernández, who parted ways with the team.
- Deniz Öncü will miss several rounds due to an injury in his left leg while training in Turkey. He will be replaced by Daniel Muñoz from the Austrian round onwards.
- Sergio García made his return at the Hungarian round, as a replacement for the injured Senna Agius, who sustained neck and head trauma due to a crash at the previous round at the Red Bull Ring.
- Harrison Voight will make his return at the next two rounds in Australia and Malaysia, as a replacement for the injured Unai Orradre due to an injury on his left wrist for the Spaniard rider, in a crash sustained at the previous round in Motegi.
- Sergio García will make his comeback once again for the final two rounds of the season as a Gresini rider. He will replace Darryn Binder who will miss the last races due to surgery on his left arm.
- Xabi Zurutuza will make his Moto2 debut as an American Racing rider, in place of the injured Joe Roberts for the final two rounds of the season.
- Eric Fernández will return to the MSi Team, replacing Unai Orradre for the final two rounds of the season.

== Rule changes ==
=== Mid-season rule changes ===
- From the start of Malaysian Grand Prix, riders wouldn't be allowed to rejoin qualifying sessions if they fall during the final three minutes. The same will apply to the Friday afternoon Practice session. In another small adjustment to the rules, riders have been instructed not warm up their tyres by means of zig-zagging in the pitlane.

== Calendar ==
The following Grands Prix took place in 2025:

Round	Date	Grand Prix	Circuit	Ref.
1	2 March	PT Grand Prix of Thailand	Buriram International Circuit, Buriram	
2	16 March	Gran Premio YPF Energía de Argentina	Autódromo Termas de Río Hondo, Termas de Río Hondo	
3	30 March	(United States) Red Bull Grand Prix of the Americas	Circuit of the Americas, Austin	
4	13 April	Qatar Airways Grand Prix of Qatar	Lusail International Circuit, Lusail	
5	27 April	Estrella Galicia 0,0 Grand Prix of Spain	Circuito de Jerez, Jerez de la Frontera	
6	11 May	Michelin Grand Prix of France	Bugatti Circuit, Le Mans	
7	25 May	Tissot Grand Prix of the United Kingdom	Silverstone Circuit, Silverstone	
8	8 June	GoPro Grand Prix of Aragon	MotorLand Aragón, Alcañiz	
9	22 June	Brembo Grand Prix of Italy	Mugello Circuit, Scarperia e San Piero	
10	29 June	Motul Grand Prix of the Netherlands	TT Circuit Assen, Assen	
11	13 July	Liqui Moly Grand Prix of Germany	Sachsenring, Hohenstein-Ernstthal	
12	20 July	(Czech Republic) Tissot Grand Prix of Czechia	Brno Circuit, Brno	
13	17 August	bwin Grand Prix of Austria	Red Bull Ring, Spielberg	
14	24 August	Michelin Grand Prix of Hungary	Balaton Park Circuit, Balatonfőkajár	
15	7 September	Monster Energy Grand Prix of Catalonia	Circuit de Barcelona-Catalunya, Montmeló	
16	14 September	Red Bull Grand Prix of San Marino and the Rimini Riviera	Misano World Circuit, Misano Adriatico	
17	28 September	Motul Grand Prix of Japan	Motegi Circuit, Motegi	
18	5 October	Pertamina Grand Prix of Indonesia	Mandalika International Street Circuit, Mandalika	
19	19 October	(Australia) Liqui Moly Australian Motorcycle Grand Prix	Phillip Island Grand Prix Circuit, Phillip Island	
20	26 October	Petronas Grand Prix of Malaysia	Sepang International Circuit, Sepang	
21	9 November	Qatar Airways Grand Prix of Portugal	Algarve International Circuit, Portimão	
22	16 November	Motul Grand Prix of the Valencian Community	Circuit Ricardo Tormo, Valencia	

The following Grand Prix acted as a reserve for 2025:

Grand Prix	Circuit	Ref.
(India) Indian motorcycle Grand Prix	Buddh International Circuit, Greater Noida	

=== Grand Prix locations ===
Location of non-European Grands Prix in 2025.
Location of European Grands Prix in 2025.

== Results and standings ==
=== Grands Prix ===
Round	Grand Prix	Pole position	Fastest lap	Winning rider	Winning team	Winning constructor	Report
1	Thailand motorcycle Grand Prix	(Spain) Manuel González	(Spain) Manuel González	(Spain) Manuel González	(Germany) Liqui Moly Dynavolt Intact GP	(Germany) Kalex	Report
2	(Argentina) Argentine motorcycle Grand Prix	(Spain) Manuel González	(United Kingdom) Jake Dixon	(United Kingdom) Jake Dixon	(Belgium) Elf Marc VDS Racing Team	(Italy) Boscoscuro	Report
3	(United States) Motorcycle Grand Prix of the Americas	(United Kingdom) Jake Dixon	(Spain) Manuel González	(United Kingdom) Jake Dixon	(Belgium) Elf Marc VDS Racing Team	(Italy) Boscoscuro	Report
4	Qatar motorcycle Grand Prix	(Spain) Manuel González	(Belgium) Barry Baltus	(Spain) Arón Canet	(Italy) Fantic Racing Lino Sonego	(Germany) Kalex	Report
5	(Spain) Spanish motorcycle Grand Prix	(Spain) Manuel González	(Spain) Manuel González	(Spain) Manuel González	(Germany) Liqui Moly Dynavolt Intact GP	(Germany) Kalex	Report
6	(France) French motorcycle Grand Prix	(Spain) Manuel González	(Belgium) Barry Baltus	(Spain) Manuel González	(Germany) Liqui Moly Dynavolt Intact GP	(Germany) Kalex	Report
7	(United Kingdom) British motorcycle Grand Prix	(Spain) Arón Canet	(Spain) Manuel González	(Australia) Senna Agius	(Germany) Liqui Moly Dynavolt Intact GP	(Germany) Kalex	Report
8	Aragon motorcycle Grand Prix	(Brazil) Diogo Moreira	(Brazil) Diogo Moreira	(Turkey) Deniz Öncü	(Finland) Red Bull KTM Ajo	(Germany) Kalex	Report
9	(Italy) Italian motorcycle Grand Prix	(Brazil) Diogo Moreira	(Spain) Manuel González	(Spain) Manuel González	(Germany) Liqui Moly Dynavolt Intact GP	(Germany) Kalex	Report
10	(Netherlands) Dutch TT	(Brazil) Diogo Moreira	(Brazil) Diogo Moreira	(Brazil) Diogo Moreira	(Italy) Italtrans Racing Team	(Germany) Kalex	Report
11	(Germany) German motorcycle Grand Prix	(United Kingdom) Jake Dixon	(Brazil) Diogo Moreira	(Turkey) Deniz Öncü	(Finland) Red Bull KTM Ajo	(Germany) Kalex	Report
12	(Czech Republic) Czech motorcycle Grand Prix	(Belgium) Barry Baltus	(United States) Joe Roberts	(United States) Joe Roberts	(United States) OnlyFans American Racing Team	(Germany) Kalex	Report
13	(Austria) Austrian motorcycle Grand Prix	(Spain) Manuel González	(Colombia) David Alonso	(Brazil) Diogo Moreira	(Italy) Italtrans Racing Team	(Germany) Kalex	Report
14	(Hungary) Hungarian motorcycle Grand Prix	(Brazil) Diogo Moreira	(Colombia) David Alonso	(Colombia) David Alonso	(Spain) CFMoto Inde Aspar Team	(Germany) Kalex	Report
15	(Catalonia) Catalan motorcycle Grand Prix	(Spain) Daniel Holgado	(Spain) Daniel Muñoz	(Spain) Daniel Holgado	(Spain) CFMoto Impulse Aspar Team	(Germany) Kalex	Report
16	San Marino and Rimini Riviera motorcycle Grand Prix	(Spain) Daniel Holgado	(Spain) Manuel González	(Italy) Celestino Vietti	(Italy) Beta Tools SpeedRS Team	(Italy) Boscoscuro	Report
17	(Japan) Japanese motorcycle Grand Prix	(Spain) Manuel González	(Spain) Daniel Holgado	(Spain) Daniel Holgado	(Spain) CFMoto Power Electronics Aspar Team	(Germany) Kalex	Report
18	(Indonesia) Indonesian motorcycle Grand Prix	(Brazil) Diogo Moreira	(Spain) Daniel Holgado	(Brazil) Diogo Moreira	(Italy) Italtrans Racing Team	(Germany) Kalex	Report
19	(Australia) Australian motorcycle Grand Prix	(Brazil) Diogo Moreira	(Spain) Albert Arenas	(Australia) Senna Agius	(Germany) Liqui Moly Dynavolt Intact GP	(Germany) Kalex	Report
20	(Malaysia) Malaysian motorcycle Grand Prix	(Spain) Daniel Holgado	(United Kingdom) Jake Dixon	(United Kingdom) Jake Dixon	(Belgium) Elf Marc VDS Racing Team	(Italy) Boscoscuro	Report
21	(Portugal) Portuguese motorcycle Grand Prix	(Brazil) Diogo Moreira	(Netherlands) Collin Veijer	(Brazil) Diogo Moreira	(Italy) Italtrans Racing Team	(Germany) Kalex	Report
22	Valencian Community motorcycle Grand Prix	(Spain) Daniel Holgado	(Spain) Iván Ortolá	(Spain) Izan Guevara	(Italy) Blu Cru Pramac Yamaha Moto2	(Italy) Boscoscuro	Report

=== Riders' standings ===
Scoring system

Points were awarded to the top fifteen finishers. A rider had to finish the race to earn points.

Position	1st	2nd	3rd	4th	5th	6th	7th	8th	9th	10th	11th	12th	13th	14th	15th
Points	25	20	16	13	11	10	9	8	7	6	5	4	3	2	1

Pos.	Rider	Bike	Team	THA (Thailand)	ARG (Argentina)	AME (United States)	QAT (Qatar)	SPA (Spain)	FRA (France)	GBR (United Kingdom)	ARA (Aragon)	ITA (Italy)	NED (Netherlands)	GER (Germany)	CZE (Czech Republic)	AUT (Austria)	HUN (Hungary)	CAT (Catalonia)	RSM (San Marino)	JPN (Japan)	INA (Indonesia)	AUS (Australia)	MAL (Malaysia)	POR (Portugal)	VAL (Valencian Community)	Pts
1	(Brazil) Diogo Moreira	Kalex	Italtrans Racing Team	4	Ret	21	5	4	4	2	2^{P F}	4^{P}	1^{P F}	Ret^{F}	Ret	1	2^{P}	14	4	3	1^{P}	3^{P}	5	1^{P}	10	287
2	(Spain) Manuel González	Kalex	Liqui Moly Dynavolt Intact GP	1^{P F}	2^{P}	22^{F}	3^{P}	1^{P F}	1^{P}	Ret^{F}	9	1^{F}	3	4	3	Ret^{P}	3	4	6^{F}	5^{P}	DSQ	7	25	6	22	257
3	(Belgium) Barry Baltus	Kalex	Fantic Racing	6	12	7	6^{F}	2	2^{F}	Ret	3	11	Ret	2	2^{P}	7	12	10	2	7	4	6	3	5	Ret	232
4	(Spain) Arón Canet	Kalex	Fantic Racing	2	4	4	1	8	3	4^{P}	6	3	2	7	Ret	10	6	Ret	7	15	3	9	15	4	15	227
5	(United Kingdom) Jake Dixon	Boscoscuro	Elf Marc VDS Racing Team	7	1^{F}	1^{P}	Ret	9	5	11	13	17	4	3^{P}	11	20	4	2	16	2	9	5	1^{F}	Ret	6	225
6	(Spain) Daniel Holgado	Kalex	CFMoto Aspar Team	8	9	8	4	Ret	16	18	Ret	15	10	12	4	2	9	1^{P}	3^{P}	1^{F}	Ret^{F}	4	4^{P}	7	2^{P}	208
7	(Italy) Celestino Vietti	Boscoscuro	Team HDR Heidrun	Ret	3	20	7	7	8	6	18	5	11	5	5	3	Ret	6	1	Ret	Ret	19	11	13	8	157
8	(Spain) Albert Arenas	Kalex	Italjet Gresini Moto2	11	10	24	9	6	6	12	12	2	7	Ret	10	4	14	16	11	9	5	8^{F}	6	8	5	156
9	(Colombia) David Alonso	Kalex	CFMoto Aspar Team	21	20	14	11	Ret	11	3	Ret	8	Ret	Ret	9	Ret^{F}	1^{F}	8	8	4	Ret	2	2	3	18	153
10	(Australia) Senna Agius	Kalex	Liqui Moly Dynavolt Intact GP	3	13	23	14	3	14	1	4	13	9	11	15	Ret		18	5	Ret	12	1	Ret	9	7	149
11	(Spain) Izan Guevara	Boscoscuro	Blu Cru Pramac Yamaha Moto2	16	15	5	22	Ret	Ret	5	11	7	Ret	8	6	9	Ret	5	10	Ret	2	16	12	10	1	134
12	(Turkey) Deniz Öncü	Kalex	Red Bull KTM Ajo	12	14	Ret	2	5	17	19	1	6	Ret	1	13											100
13	(Spain) Marcos Ramírez	Kalex	OnlyFans American Racing Team	5	5	11	8	12	15	9	8	10	6	Ret	7	12	11	13	19	12	Ret	Ret	16	Ret	12	100
14	(United States) Joe Roberts	Kalex	OnlyFans American Racing Team	18	16	25	15	11	12	8	7	9	5	6	1^{F}	Ret	19	12	20	Ret	6	13	Ret			97
15	(Netherlands) Collin Veijer	Kalex	Red Bull KTM Ajo	20	24	10	13	14	Ret			20	14	16	16	8	5	9	21	10	8	12	9	2^{F}	4	97
16	(Spain) Iván Ortolá	Boscoscuro	QJMotor – Frinsa – MSi	22	19	6	18	18	9	Ret	14	16	Ret	13	12	6	10	11	13	8	7	18	13	14	3^{F}	88
17	(Czech Republic) Filip Salač	Boscoscuro	Elf Marc VDS Racing Team	9	Ret	Ret	10	10	7	7	5	12	Ret	10	8	11	8	Ret	18	13	Ret	DNS	Ret	15	14	85
18	(Spain) Alonso López	Boscoscuro	Team HDR Heidrun	10	8	3	16	DSQ	10	10	10	14	8	Ret	18	16	Ret	7	15	11	14	15	14	19	11	83
19	(Italy) Tony Arbolino	Boscoscuro	Blu Cru Pramac Yamaha Moto2	13	11	2	20	15	Ret	14	17	18	13	Ret	19	5	15	20	9	6	16	17	10	17	9	76
20	(Spain) Daniel Muñoz	Forward	Klint Forward Factory Team						21	21																37
20	(Spain) Daniel Muñoz	Kalex	Red Bull KTM Ajo								15					14	20	3^{F}	12	Ret	17	21	7	11	23	37
21	(Spain) Adrián Huertas	Kalex	Italtrans Racing Team	14	Ret	16	17	13	18		19	22	Ret	18	14	18	7	17	Ret	16	10	11	18	18	DNS	27
22	(Spain) Álex Escrig	Forward	Klint Forward Factory Team	DNS	7	15	21	17			21	24	16	20	21	19	17	19	25	17	Ret	23	8	12	13	25
23	(Japan) Ayumu Sasaki	Kalex	RW-Idrofoglia Racing GP	23	18	19	Ret	Ret	20	17	Ret	19	15	9	Ret	13	Ret	Ret	14	14	13	10	17	Ret	DNS	24
24	(South Africa) Darryn Binder	Kalex	Italjet Gresini Moto2	17	6	DNS	Ret	19	DNS		Ret	21	Ret	15	17	15	Ret	21	23	Ret	11	14	Ret			19
25	(Netherlands) Zonta van den Goorbergh	Kalex	RW-Idrofoglia Racing GP	24	17	13	12	20	19	13	16	Ret	12	17	20	21	13	15	17	Ret	15	22	21	16	16	19
26	(Indonesia) Mario Aji	Kalex	Idemitsu Honda Team Asia	15	Ret	9	23	DNS		WD								23	24	21	19	20	22	21	17	8
27	(Spain) Óscar Gutiérrez	Boscoscuro	QJMotor – Frinsa – MSi	25	22	12																				4
28	(Spain) Sergio García	Boscoscuro	QJMotor – Frinsa – MSi				19	22	13	16	20															3
28	(Spain) Sergio García	Kalex	Liqui Moly Dynavolt Intact GP														16									3
28	(Spain) Sergio García	Kalex	Italjet Gresini Moto2																					20	Ret	3
29	(Spain) Jorge Navarro	Forward	Klint Forward Factory Team	Ret	21	18	25	21	Ret	15	23	Ret	Ret	14	22	17	18	Ret	Ret	19	20	24	19	22	19	3
30	(Japan) Yuki Kunii	Kalex	Idemitsu Honda Team Asia	19	23	17	24	16	22	20	22	23	Ret	19	23	24	Ret	24	Ret	18	18	25	20	23	20	0
31	(Spain) Eric Fernández	Boscoscuro	QJMotor – Frinsa – MSi									26	17	Ret	25									Ret	Ret	0
31	(Spain) Eric Fernández	Boscoscuro	FAU55 Racing															Ret								0
32	(Spain) Unai Orradre	Boscoscuro	QJMotor – Frinsa – MSi													23	Ret	22	26	20	Ret					0
33	(Thailand) Nakarin Atiratphuvapat	Kalex	Idemitsu Honda Team Asia								24	25	Ret			25	21									0
34	(Japan) Taiga Hada	Kalex	Idemitsu Honda Team Asia											21	24											0
35	(Spain) Xabi Zurutuza	Kalex	OnlyFans American Racing Team																					Ret	21	0
36	(Spain) Alberto Ferrández	Boscoscuro	Beta Tools – Boscoscuro																22							0
37	(Italy) Mattia Pasini	Kalex	Fantic Racing Redemption												Ret	22										0
38	(Malaysia) Helmi Azman	Kalex	Petronas MIE Racing RW																				23			0
39	(Italy) Alessandro Morosi	Kalex	Fantic Racing Eagle-1																					24		0
40	(Malaysia) Azroy Anuar	Kalex	Petronas MIE Racing RW																				24			0
41	(Australia) Harrison Voight	Boscoscuro	QJMotor – Frinsa – MSi																			26	26			0
42	(Italy) Alberto Surra	Kalex	Andifer ART																27							0
	(Poland) Milan Pawelec	Kalex	AGR Team Fusport												Ret											0
	(Spain) Héctor Garzó	NTS	RW NTS Idrofoglia																						Ret	0
Pos.	Rider	Bike	Team	THA (Thailand)	ARG (Argentina)	AME (United States)	QAT (Qatar)	SPA (Spain)	FRA (France)	GBR (United Kingdom)	ARA (Aragon)	ITA (Italy)	NED (Netherlands)	GER (Germany)	CZE (Czech Republic)	AUT (Austria)	HUN (Hungary)	CAT (Catalonia)	RSM (San Marino)	JPN (Japan)	INA (Indonesia)	AUS (Australia)	MAL (Malaysia)	POR (Portugal)	VAL (Valencian Community)	Pts

Race key
Colour	Result
Gold	Winner
Silver	2nd place
Bronze	3rd place
Green	Points finish
Blue	Non-points finish
Blue	Non-classified finish (NC)
Purple	Retired (Ret)
Red	Did not qualify (DNQ)
Black	Disqualified (DSQ)
White	Did not start (DNS)
White	Withdrew (WD)
White	Race cancelled (C)
Blank	Did not practice (DNP)
Blank	Excluded (EX)
Blank	Did not arrive (DNA)
Blank	Did not enter (empty cell)
Annotation	Meaning
P	Pole position
F	Fastest lap
Rider key
Colour	Meaning
Light blue	Rookie rider

=== Constructors' standings ===
Each constructor was awarded the same number of points as their best placed rider in each race.

Pos.	Constructor	THA (Thailand)	ARG (Argentina)	AME (United States)	QAT (Qatar)	SPA (Spain)	FRA (France)	GBR (United Kingdom)	ARA (Aragon)	ITA (Italy)	NED (Netherlands)	GER (Germany)	CZE (Czech Republic)	AUT (Austria)	HUN (Hungary)	CAT (Catalonia)	RSM (San Marino)	JPN (Japan)	INA (Indonesia)	AUS (Australia)	MAL (Malaysia)	POR (Portugal)	VAL (Valencian Community)	Pts
1	(Germany) Kalex	1	2	4	1	1	1	1	1	1	1	1	1	1	1	1	2	1	1	1	2	1	2	518
2	(Italy) Boscoscuro	7	1	1	7	7	5	5	5	5	4	3	5	3	4	2	1	2	3	5	1	10	1	342
3	(Switzerland) Forward	Ret	7	15	21	17	20	15	21	24	16	14	21	17	17	19	25	17	21	23	8	12	13	28
Pos.	Constructor	THA (Thailand)	ARG (Argentina)	AME (United States)	QAT (Qatar)	SPA (Spain)	FRA (France)	GBR (United Kingdom)	ARA (Aragon)	ITA (Italy)	NED (Netherlands)	GER (Germany)	CZE (Czech Republic)	AUT (Austria)	HUN (Hungary)	CAT (Catalonia)	RSM (San Marino)	JPN (Japan)	INA (Indonesia)	AUS (Australia)	MAL (Malaysia)	POR (Portugal)	VAL (Valencian Community)	Pts

=== Teams' standings ===
The teams' standings were based on results obtained by regular and substitute riders; wild-card entries were ineligible.

Pos.	Team	Bike No.	THA (Thailand)	ARG (Argentina)	AME (United States)	QAT (Qatar)	SPA (Spain)	FRA (France)	GBR (United Kingdom)	ARA (Aragon)	ITA (Italy)	NED (Netherlands)	GER (Germany)	CZE (Czech Republic)	AUT (Austria)	HUN (Hungary)	CAT (Catalonia)	RSM (San Marino)	JPN (Japan)	INA (Indonesia)	AUS (Australia)	MAL (Malaysia)	POR (Portugal)	VAL (Valencian Community)	Pts
1	(Italy) Fantic Racing (Note: For rounds 1–16, the team used the name Fantic Racing Lino Sonego.)	7	6	12	7	6^{F}	2	2^{F}	Ret	3	11	Ret	2	2^{P}	7	12	10	2	7	4	6	3	5	Ret	459
1	(Italy) Fantic Racing	44	2	4	4	1	8	3	4^{P}	6	3	2	7	Ret	10	6	Ret	7	15	3	9	15	4	15	459
2	(Germany) Liqui Moly Dynavolt Intact GP	3														16									406
2	(Germany) Liqui Moly Dynavolt Intact GP	18	1^{P F}	2^{P}	22^{F}	3^{P}	1^{P F}	1^{P}	Ret^{F}	9	1^{F}	3	4	3	Ret^{P}	3	4	6^{F}	5^{P}	DSQ	7	25	6	22	406
2	(Germany) Liqui Moly Dynavolt Intact GP	81	3	13	23	14	3	14	1	4	13	9	11	15	Ret		18	5	Ret	12	1	Ret	9	7	406
3	(Spain) CFMoto Aspar Team	27	8	9	8	4	Ret	16	18	Ret	15	10	12	4	2	9	1^{P}	3^{P}	1^{F}	Ret^{F}	4	4^{P}	7	2^{P}	361
3	(Spain) CFMoto Aspar Team	80	21	20	14	11	Ret	11	3	Ret	8	Ret	Ret	9	Ret^{F}	1^{F}	8	8	4	Ret	2	2	3	20	361
4	(Italy) Italtrans Racing Team	10	4	Ret	21	5	4	4	2	2^{P F}	4^{P}	1^{P F}	Ret^{F}	Ret	1	2^{P}	14	4	3	1^{P}	3^{P}	5	1^{P}	10	314
4	(Italy) Italtrans Racing Team	99	14	Ret	16	17	13	18		19	22	Ret	18	14	18	7	17	Ret	16	10	11	18	18	DNS	314
5	(Belgium) Elf Marc VDS Racing Team	12	9	Ret	Ret	10	10	7	7	5	12	Ret	10	8	11	8	Ret	18	13	Ret	DNS	Ret	15	14	310
5	(Belgium) Elf Marc VDS Racing Team	96	7	1^{F}	1^{P}	Ret	9	5	11	13	17	4	3^{P}	11	20	4	2	16	2	9	5	1^{F}	Ret	6	310
6	(Italy) SpeedRS Team	13	Ret	3	20	7	7	8	6	18	5	11	5	5	3	Ret	6	1	Ret	Ret	19	11	13	8	240
6	(Italy) SpeedRS Team	21	10	8	3	16	DSQ	10	10	10	14	8	Ret	18	16	Ret	7	15	11	14	15	14	19	11	240
6	(Italy) SpeedRS Team	93																22							240
7	(Finland) Red Bull KTM Ajo	17								15					14	20	3^{F}	12	Ret	17	21	7	11	23	234
7	(Finland) Red Bull KTM Ajo	53	12	14	Ret	2	5	17	19	1	6	Ret	1	13											234
7	(Finland) Red Bull KTM Ajo	95	20	24	10	13	14	Ret			20	14	16	16	8	5	9	21	10	8	12	9	2^{F}	4	234
8	(Italy) Blu Cru Pramac Yamaha Moto2	14	13	11	2	20	15	Ret	14	17	18	13	Ret	19	5	15	20	9	6	16	17	10	17	9	210
8	(Italy) Blu Cru Pramac Yamaha Moto2	28	16	15	5	22	Ret	Ret	5	11	7	Ret	8	6	9	Ret	5	10	Ret	2	16	12	10	1	210
9	(United States) OnlyFans American Racing Team	16	18	16	25	15	11	12	8	7	9	5	6	1^{F}	Ret	19	12	20	Ret	6	13	Ret			197
9	(United States) OnlyFans American Racing Team	24	5	5	11	8	12	15	9	8	10	6	Ret	7	12	11	13	19	12	Ret	Ret	16	Ret	12	197
9	(United States) OnlyFans American Racing Team	67																27							197
9	(United States) OnlyFans American Racing Team	85																					Ret	26	197
10	(Italy) Italjet Gresini Moto2	3																					20		175
10	(Italy) Italjet Gresini Moto2	15	17	6	DNS	Ret	19	DNS		Ret	21	Ret	15	17	15	Ret	21	23	Ret	11	14	Ret			175
10	(Italy) Italjet Gresini Moto2	75	11	10	24	9	6	6	12	12	2	7	Ret	10	4	14	16	11	9	5	8^{F}	6	8	5	175
11	(Spain) QJMotor – Frinsa – MSi	3				19	22	13	16	20															95
11	(Spain) QJMotor – Frinsa – MSi	4	22	19	6	18	18	9	Ret	14	16	Ret	13	12	6	10	11	13	8	7	18	13	14	3^{F}	95
11	(Spain) QJMotor – Frinsa – MSi	19													23	Ret	22	26	20	Ret					95
11	(Spain) QJMotor – Frinsa – MSi	29																			26	26			95
11	(Spain) QJMotor – Frinsa – MSi	61									26	17	Ret	25									Ret	Ret	95
11	(Spain) QJMotor – Frinsa – MSi	66	25	22	12																				95
12	(Netherlands) RW-Idrofoglia Racing GP	71	23	18	19	Ret	Ret	20	17	Ret	19	15	9	Ret	13	Ret	Ret	14	14	13	10	17	Ret	DNS	43
12	(Netherlands) RW-Idrofoglia Racing GP	84	24	17	13	12	20	19	13	16	Ret	12	17	20	21	13	15	17	Ret	15	22	21	16	16	43
13	(Switzerland) Klint Forward Factory Team	9	Ret	21	18	25	21	Ret	15	23	Ret	Ret	14	22	17	18	Ret	Ret	19	20	24	19	22	19	28
13	(Switzerland) Klint Forward Factory Team	11	DNS	7	15	21	17			21	24	16	20	21	19	17	19	25	17	Ret	23	8	12	13	28
13	(Switzerland) Klint Forward Factory Team	17						21	21																28
14	(Japan) Idemitsu Honda Team Asia	23											21	24											8
14	(Japan) Idemitsu Honda Team Asia	41								24	25	Ret			25	21									8
14	(Japan) Idemitsu Honda Team Asia	64	15	Ret	9	23	DNS		WD								23	24	21	19	20	22	21	17	8
14	(Japan) Idemitsu Honda Team Asia	92	19	23	17	24	16	22	20	22	23	Ret	19	23	24	Ret	24	Ret	18	18	25	20	23	20	8
Pos.	Team	Bike No.	THA (Thailand)	ARG (Argentina)	AME (United States)	QAT (Qatar)	SPA (Spain)	FRA (France)	GBR (United Kingdom)	ARA (Aragon)	ITA (Italy)	NED (Netherlands)	GER (Germany)	CZE (Czech Republic)	AUT (Austria)	HUN (Hungary)	CAT (Catalonia)	RSM (San Marino)	JPN (Japan)	INA (Indonesia)	AUS (Australia)	MAL (Malaysia)	POR (Portugal)	VAL (Valencian Community)	Pts
