= Arón Canet =

Spanish motorcycle racer (born 1999)

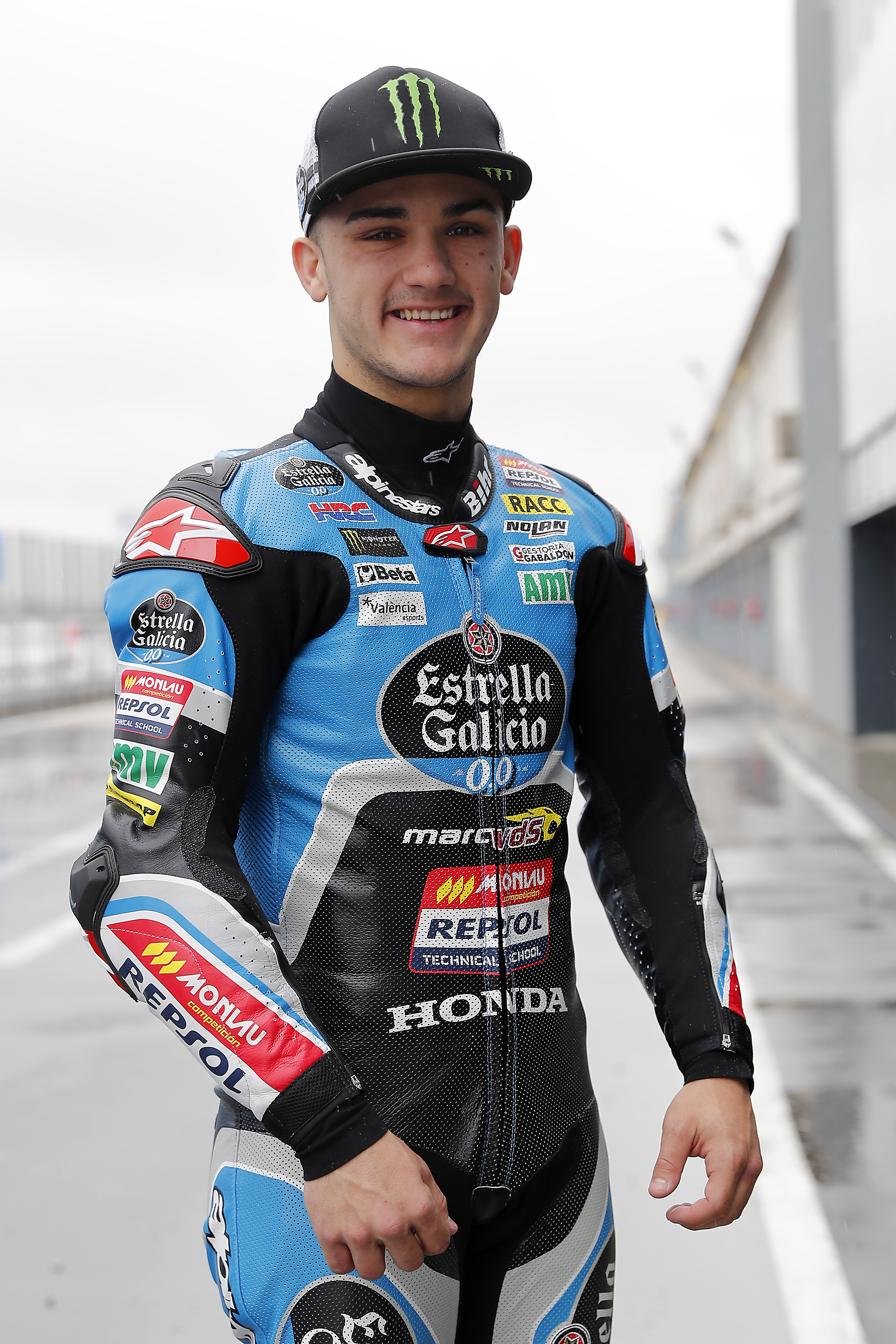
- Canet in 2018
- Nationality: Spanish
- Born: 30 September 1999 (age 27); Corbera, Spain
- Current team: Elf Marc VDS Racing Team
- Bike number: 44
Motorcycle racing career statistics
Moto2 World Championship
Active years	2020–
Manufacturers	Speed Up (2020); Boscoscuro (2021, 2026); Kalex (2022–2025)
2025 championship position	4th (227 pts)
Starts / Wins / Podiums / Poles / F. laps / Points; 126 / 5 / 34 / 14 / 8 / 1104.5
Moto3 World Championship
Active years	2016–2019
Manufacturers	Honda (2016–2018); KTM (2019)
Championships	0
2019 championship position	2nd (200 pts)
Starts / Wins / Podiums / Poles / F. laps / Points; 72 / 6 / 17 / 5 / 9 / 603

Arón Canet Barbero (born 30 September 1999) is a Spanish motorcycle racer set to race in the 2026 Moto2 World Championship for Elf Marc VDS Racing Team aboard a Boscoscuro. He is a vice-champion in both Moto3 and Moto2, having achieved that feat in 2019 and 2024, respectively.

== Career ==
=== Early career ===
In 2013, Canet won the Copa De España PreMoto3, and in 2015, he was the third-place finisher in the 2015 FIM CEV Moto3 Junior World Championship.

=== Moto3 World Championship ===
==== Estrella Galicia 0,0 (2016–2018) ====
In 2016, Canet made his Grand Prix debut in the Moto3 World Championship with the Estrella Galicia 0,0 team riding a Honda.

==== Sterilgarda Max Racing Team (2019) ====
Canet was a strong contender for the championship in 2019, until a spate of retirements cost him the championship to Lorenzo Dalla Porta, who wrapped up the championship in Australia, after Canet crashed out of the lead on lap 2 of this race.

=== Moto2 World Championship ===
==== Aspar Team (2020–2021) ====
In 2020 season, Canet graduated for Inde Aspar Team in the Moto2 World Championship.

==== Pons Wegow Los40 (2022–2023) ====
After that, in 2022 season, Canet joined with the Flexbox HP40.

==== Marc VDS Racing Team (2026-) ====
On 16 August 2025, it was announced that Canet would join the Marc VDS Racing Team for the upcoming 2026 Moto2 season. He was joined by Deniz Öncü

== Career statistics ==
=== FIM CEV Moto3 Junior World Championship ===
==== Races by year ====
(key) (Races in bold indicate pole position; races in italics indicate fastest lap)

Year	Bike	1	2	3	4	5	6	7	8	9	10	11	12	Pos	Pts
2014	Honda	JER1; 22	JER2; 20	LMS; 21	ARA; 16	CAT1; Ret	CAT2; Ret	ALB; 16	NAV; 11	ALG; 12	VAL1; 13	VAL2; Ret		23rd	12
2015	Honda	ALG; 2	**LMS**; 1	CAT1; 1	CAT2; 2	ARA1; 3	ARA2; Ret	**ALB**; 1	**NAV**; 1	JER1; DNS	JER2; DNS	VAL1; Ret	VAL2; 2	3rd	176

=== Grand Prix motorcycle racing ===
==== By season ====
Season	Class	Motorcycle	Team	Race	Win	Podium	Pole	FLap	Pts	Plcd
2016	Moto3	Honda	Estrella Galicia 0,0	18	0	1	1	2	76	15th
2017	Moto3	Honda	Estrella Galicia 0,0	18	3	5	2	3	199	**3rd**
2018	Moto3	Honda	Estrella Galicia 0,0	17	0	4	0	4	128	6th
2019	Moto3	KTM	Sterilgarda Max Racing Team	19	3	7	2	0	200	**2nd**
2020	Moto2	Speed Up	Aspar Team	12	0	0	1	0	67	14th
2021	Moto2	Boscoscuro	Aspar Team	18	0	5	0	0	164	6th
2022	Moto2	Kalex	Flexbox HP40	19	0	8	3	2	200	**3rd**
2023	Moto2	Kalex	Pons Wegow Los40	19	0	7	3	0	195	5th
2024	Moto2	Kalex	Fantic Racing	19	4	8	6	6	234	**2nd**
2025	Moto2	Kalex	Fantic Racing	22	1	6	1	0	227	4th
2026	Moto2	Boscoscuro	Elf Marc VDS Racing Team	17	0	0	0	0	17.5*	23rd*
Total				**198**	**11**	**51**	**19**	**17**	**1707.5**	

==== By class ====
Class	Seasons	1st GP	1st pod	1st win	Race	Win	Podiums	Pole	FLap	Pts	WChmp
Moto3	2016–2019	2016 Qatar	2016 Australia	2017 Spain	72	6	17	5	9	603	0
Moto2	2020–present	2020 Qatar	2021 Portugal	2024 Portugal	126	5	34	14	8	1104.5	0
Total	2016–present				**198**	**11**	**51**	**19**	**17**	**1707.5**	**0**

==== Races by year ====
(key) (Races in bold indicate pole position; races in italics indicate fastest lap)

Year	Class	Bike	1	2	3	4	5	6	7	8	9	10	11	12	13	14	15	16	17	18	19	20	21	22	Pos	Pts
2016	Moto3	Honda	QAT; 15	ARG; Ret	AME; 7	SPA; Ret	FRA; 4	ITA; Ret	CAT; 6	NED; Ret	GER; 15	AUT; 21	CZE; Ret	GBR; 8	RSM; 7	ARA; 7	JPN; Ret	AUS; 3	MAL; Ret	**VAL**; 19					15th	76
2017	Moto3	Honda	QAT; 4	ARG; 11	**AME**; Ret	SPA; 1	FRA; 2	ITA; 5	CAT; 5	NED; 1	**GER**; Ret	CZE; 3	AUT; 5	GBR; 1	RSM; Ret	ARA; 5	JPN; 5	AUS; NC	MAL; 8	VAL; 9					3rd	199
2018	Moto3	Honda	QAT; 2	ARG; 2	AME; 8	SPA; Ret	FRA; 8	ITA; 11	CAT; Ret	NED; 2	GER; 5	CZE; 2	AUT; 10	GBR; C	RSM; Ret	ARA; Ret	THA	JPN; Ret	AUS; 6	MAL; Ret	VAL; Ret				6th	128
2019	Moto3	KTM	**QAT**; 3	ARG; 12	AME; 1	SPA; 4	FRA; 3	ITA; 7	CAT; 2	NED; 12	GER; 3	CZE; 1	AUT; 10	GBR; 13	RSM; Ret	**ARA**; 1	THA; NC	JPN; Ret	AUS; Ret	MAL; 8	VAL; 6				2nd	200
2020	Moto2	Speed Up	QAT; 8	SPA; 5	ANC; 5	CZE; 10	AUT; 9	**STY**; Ret	RSM; 9	EMI; 13	CAT; 8	FRA; DNS	ARA	TER	EUR; 11	VAL; Ret	POR; 15								14th	67
2021	Moto2	Boscoscuro	QAT; 13	DOH; Ret	POR; 2	SPA; 9	FRA; Ret	ITA; 11	CAT; Ret	GER; 2	NED; Ret	STY; 2	AUT; 8	GBR; 7	ARA; 5	RSM; 3	AME; 11	EMI; 3	ALR; 4	VAL; 5					6th	164
2022	Moto2	Kalex	QAT; 2	INA; 3	ARG; 4	AME; Ret	**POR**; Ret	SPA; 2	FRA; 2	**ITA**; Ret	CAT; 2	GER; 9	NED; DNS	GBR; 5	AUT; 6	RSM; 2	ARA; 2	**JPN**; Ret	THA; 3^{‡}	AUS; 9	MAL; 8	VAL; Ret			3rd	200
2023	Moto2	Kalex	POR; 2	ARG; 4	AME; 8	SPA; 5	FRA; DNS	**ITA**; 4	GER; Ret	NED; 5	GBR; 2	AUT; Ret	CAT; 2	RSM; Ret	IND; Ret	JPN; 8	**INA**; 2	AUS; 2^{‡}	THA; 11	MAL; Ret	QAT; 3	**VAL**; 2			5th	195
2024	Moto2	Kalex	**QAT**; 10	POR; 1	**AME**; 9	SPA; DNS	**FRA**; 6	CAT; Ret	ITA; 6	NED; Ret	GER; Ret	GBR; 2	AUT; 4	ARA; Ret	RSM; 2	**EMI**; 2	**INA**; 1	JPN; 16	AUS; 2	THA; 1	MAL; 8	**SLD**; 1			2nd	234
2025	Moto2	Kalex	THA; 2	ARG; 4	AME; 4	QAT; 1	SPA; 8	FRA; 3	**GBR**; 4	ARA; 6	ITA; 3	NED; 2	GER; 7	CZE; Ret	AUT; 10	HUN; 6	CAT; Ret	RSM; 7	JPN; 15	INA; 3	AUS; 9	MAL; 15	POR; 4	VAL; 15	4th	227
2026	Moto2	Boscoscuro	THA; 11^{‡}	BRA; 22	USA; 13	SPA; Ret	FRA; 10	CAT; 14	ITA; Ret	HUN; Ret	CZE; Ret	NED; 16	GER; Ret	GBR; Ret	ARA; 25	RSM; 15	AUT; 13	JPN; 17	INA; Ret	AUS; C	MAL	QAT	POR	VAL	23rd*	17.5*

^{‡} Half points awarded as less than two thirds (2022 Thailand GP)/less than half (2023 Australian/2026 Thailand GP) of the race distance (but at least three full laps) was completed.
* Season still in progress.
