= Barry Baltus =

Belgian motorcycle racer

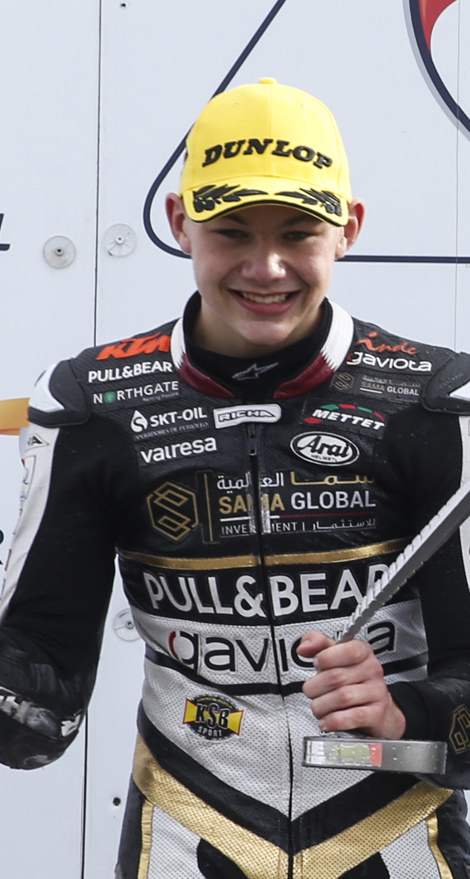
- Baltus in 2019
- Nationality: Belgian
- Born: 3 May 2004 (age 22); Namur, Belgium
- Current team: Reds Fantic Racing
- Bike number: 7
Motorcycle racing career statistics
Moto2 World Championship
Active years	2021–
Manufacturers	NTS, Kalex
2025 championship position	3rd (232 pts)
Starts / Wins / Podiums / Poles / F. laps / Points; 107 / 0 / 9 / 2 / 2 / 420
Moto3 World Championship
Active years	2020
Manufacturers	KTM
Championships	0
2020 championship position	26th (0 pts)
Starts / Wins / Podiums / Poles / F. laps / Points; 14 / 0 / 0 / 0 / 0 / 0

Barry Baltus (born 3 May 2004) is a Belgian Grand Prix motorcycle racer.

== Career ==
=== Early career ===
Baltus was the 2014 Belgian Mini-GP2 Champion.

=== Moto3 World Championship ===
Baltus contested the 2020 season as a full-time rider in the Moto3 World Championship for CarXpert Prüstel GP, despite missing the Qatar Grand Prix due to him being under the age limit.

=== Moto2 World Championship ===
In 2021, Baltus moved to the Moto2 class with NTS RW Racing GP. A free practice crash at the opening round in Qatar resulted in a wrist injury which delayed his race debut until the fifth round in France. A difficult season on the uncompetitive NTS machinery resulted in just one points finish for Baltus, ultimately finishing the season with just two points and in 32nd position of the rider's championship. 2022 was a significant improvement, as RW Racing switched to Kalex chassis, and Baltus scored 30 points (finishing twice in the top-ten), gaining experience in Moto2 class.

== Career statistics ==
=== European Talent Cup ===
==== Races by year ====
(key) (Races in bold indicate pole position; races in italics indicate fastest lap)

Year	Bike	1	2	3	4	5	6	7	8	9	10	11	Pos	Pts
2017	Honda	ALB1	ALB2	CAT	VAL1	EST1	EST2	JER1	JER2	ARA1	ARA2	VAL2; 14	31st	2
2018	Honda	**EST1**; 1	**EST2**; 3	VAL1; 10	VAL2; 9	CAT	ARA1	ARA2	JER1	JER2	ALB	VAL	12th	54

=== Red Bull MotoGP Rookies Cup ===
==== Races by year ====
(key) (Races in bold indicate pole position; races in italics indicate fastest lap)

Year	1	2	3	4	5	6	7	8	9	10	11	12	Pos	Pts
2018	JER1; 7	JER2; 11	ITA; 13	ASS; 9	ASS; 4	GER1; 11	GER2; 11	AUT; 16	AUT; 12	MIS; 15	ARA; 11	ARA; 13	11th	60
2019	JER1; 3	JER2; Ret	ITA; 8	ASS1; Ret	ASS2; 3	GER1; DNS	GER2; DNS	AUT1; 8	AUT2; 12	MIS; Ret	ARA1; Ret	ARA2; 8	12th	60

=== FIM CEV Moto3 Junior World Championship ===
==== Races by year ====
(key) (Races in bold indicate pole position, races in italics indicate fastest lap)

Year	Bike	1	2	3	4	5	6	7	8	9	10	11	12	Pos	Pts
2018	KTM	EST	VAL1	VAL2	FRA; Ret	CAT1; 17	CAT2; 19	ARA; Ret	JER1; 18	JER2; 18	ALB; 9	VAL1; 17	VAL2; 18	31st	7
2019	KTM	EST; 1	VAL1; 9	VAL2; 7	FRA; 5	CAT1; 2	CAT2; 2	ARA; 8	JER1; 11	JER2; Ret	ALB; 4	VAL1; 8	VAL2; 2	4th	146

=== Grand Prix motorcycle racing ===
==== By season ====
Season	Class	Motorcycle	Team	Race	Win	Podium	Pole	FLap	Pts	Plcd
2020	Moto3	KTM	CarXpert Prüstel GP	14	0	0	0	0	0	26th
2021	Moto2	NTS	NTS RW Racing GP	14	0	0	0	0	2	32nd
2022	Moto2	Kalex	RW Racing GP	16	0	0	0	0	30	21st
2023	Moto2	Kalex	Fieten Olie Racing GP	19	0	0	0	0	55	17th
2024	Moto2	Kalex	RW-Idrofoglia Racing GP	20	0	1	0	0	40	21st
2025	Moto2	Kalex	Fantic Racing Lino Sonego	22	0	7	1	2	232	**3rd**
2026	Moto2	Kalex	Reds Fantic Racing	16	0	1	1	0	61*	14th*
Total				**121**	**0**	**9**	**2**	**2**	**420**	

==== By class ====
Class	Seasons	1st GP	1st pod	1st win	Race	Win	Podiums	Pole	FLap	Pts	WChmp
Moto3	2020	2020 Spain			14	0	0	0	0	0	0
Moto2	2021–present	2021 France	2024 Qatar		107	0	9	2	2	420	0
Total	2020–present				**121**	**0**	**9**	**2**	**2**	**420**	**0**

==== Races by year ====
(key) (Races in bold indicate pole position; races in italics indicate fastest lap)

Year	Class	Bike	1	2	3	4	5	6	7	8	9	10	11	12	13	14	15	16	17	18	19	20	21	22	Pos	Pts
2020	Moto3	KTM	QAT	SPA; 24	ANC; 17	CZE; 21	AUT; Ret	STY; 18	RSM; 24	EMI; 22	CAT; 16	FRA; 16	ARA; 25	TER; 21	EUR; 20	VAL; 17	POR; 16								26th	0
2021	Moto2	NTS	QAT; DNS	DOH	POR	SPA	FRA; 17	ITA; 17	CAT; 22	GER; 14	NED; 24	STY; Ret	AUT; Ret	GBR; 23	ARA; 16	RSM; Ret	AME; 17	EMI; 17	ALR; 23	VAL; 18					32nd	2
2022	Moto2	Kalex	QAT; Ret	INA; DNS	ARG	AME; 10	POR; 9	SPA; 14	FRA; Ret	ITA; 16	CAT; 17	GER; Ret	NED; 15	GBR; 16	AUT; 12	RSM; 13	ARA; 13	JPN; 14	THA; 12^{‡}	AUS; Ret	MAL; DNS	VAL			21st	30
2023	Moto2	Kalex	POR; 12	ARG; 19	AME; Ret	SPA; 13	FRA; 7	ITA; 16	GER; 12	NED; 12	GBR; 6	AUT; DNS	CAT; 12	RSM; 15	IND; 8	JPN; 15	INA; Ret	AUS; Ret	THA; 18	MAL; 11	QAT; 18	VAL; 14			17th	55
2024	Moto2	Kalex	QAT; 2	POR; 13	AME; 16	SPA; Ret	FRA; Ret	CAT; 21	ITA; 18	NED; 17	GER; 20	GBR; 16	AUT; Ret	ARA; 13	RSM; 18	EMI; 18	INA; 11	JPN; 18	AUS; 7	THA; Ret	MAL; 18	SLD; 17			21st	40
2025	Moto2	Kalex	THA; 6	ARG; 12	AME; 7	QAT; 6	SPA; 2	FRA; 2	GBR; Ret	ARA; 3	ITA; 11	NED; Ret	GER; 2	**CZE**; 2	AUT; 7	HUN; 12	CAT; 10	RSM; 2	JPN; 7	INA; 4	AUS; 6	MAL; 3	POR; 5	VAL; Ret	3rd	232
2026	Moto2	Kalex	THA; 14^{‡}	BRA; 14	**USA**; 6	SPA; Ret	FRA; Ret	CAT; 13	ITA; 8	HUN; 12	CZE; DNS	NED	GER	GBR; 9	ARA; 15	RSM; 3	AUT; 8	JPN; 16	INA; 18	AUS; C	MAL; 17	QAT; 15	POR	VAL	14th*	61*

^{‡} Half points awarded as less than two thirds (2022 Thailand GP)/less than half (2026 Thailand GP) of the race distance (but at least three full laps) was completed..
* Season still in progress.
