= 2025 San Marino and Rimini Riviera motorcycle Grand Prix =

Motorcycle races in Misano Adriatico

2025 San Marino and Rimini Riviera Grand Prix
Race details
- Race 16 of 22 races in the 2025 Grand Prix motorcycle racing season
- Date: 14 September 2025
- Official name: Red Bull Grand Prix of San Marino and the Rimini Riviera
- Location: Misano World Circuit Marco Simoncelli; Misano Adriatico, Province of Rimini, Italy
- Course: Permanent racing facility; 4.226 km (2.626 mi)

MotoGP
Pole position
Rider	(Italy) Marco Bezzecchi	Aprilia
Time	1:30.134	
Fastest lap
Rider	(Spain) Marc Márquez	Ducati
Time	1:31.290 on lap 25	
Podium
First	(Spain) Marc Márquez	Ducati
Second	(Italy) Marco Bezzecchi	Aprilia
Third	(Spain) Álex Márquez	Ducati

Moto2
Pole position
Rider	(Spain) Daniel Holgado	Kalex
Time	1:34.216	
Fastest lap
Rider	(Spain) Manuel González	Kalex
Time	1:34.759 on lap 4	
Podium
First	(Italy) Celestino Vietti	Boscoscuro
Second	(Belgium) Barry Baltus	Kalex
Third	(Spain) Daniel Holgado	Kalex

Moto3
Pole position
Rider	(Argentina) Valentín Perrone	KTM
Time	1:40.328	
Fastest lap
Rider	(Argentina) Valentín Perrone	KTM
Time	1:40.463 on lap 11	
Podium
First	(Spain) José Antonio Rueda	KTM
Second	(Spain) Máximo Quiles	KTM
Third	(Spain) Adrián Fernández	Honda

MotoE Race 1
Pole position
Rider	(Brazil) Eric Granado	Ducati
Time	1:40.030	
Fastest lap
Rider	(Brazil) Eric Granado	Ducati
Time	1;40.143 on lap 2	
Podium
First	(Italy) Alessandro Zaccone	Ducati
Second	(Italy) Nicholas Spinelli	Ducati
Third	(Italy) Andrea Mantovani	Ducati

MotoE Race 2
Pole position
Rider	(Brazil) Eric Granado	Ducati
Time	1:40.030	
Fastest lap
Rider	(Spain) Héctor Garzó	Ducati
Time	1:40.124 on lap 2	
Podium
First	(Italy) Matteo Ferrari	Ducati
Second	(Brazil) Eric Granado	Ducati
Third	(Italy) Mattia Casadei	Ducati

The 2025 San Marino and Rimini Riviera motorcycle Grand Prix (officially known as the Red Bull Grand Prix of San Marino and the Rimini Riviera) was the sixteenth round of the 2025 Grand Prix motorcycle racing season and the sixth round of the 2025 MotoE World Championship. All races (except for both MotoE races which were held on 13 September) were held at the Misano World Circuit Marco Simoncelli in Misano Adriatico on 14 September 2025.

== MotoGP Sprint ==
The MotoGP Sprint was held on 13 September 2025.

Pos.	No.	Rider	Team	Manufacturer	Laps	Time/Retired	Grid	Points
1	72	(Italy) Marco Bezzecchi	Aprilia Racing	Aprilia	13	19:52.966	1	12
2	73	(Spain) Álex Márquez	BK8 Gresini Racing MotoGP	Ducati	13	+1.000	2	9
3	49	(Italy) Fabio Di Giannantonio	Pertamina Enduro VR46 Racing Team	Ducati	13	+2.551	7	7
4	21	(Italy) Franco Morbidelli	Pertamina Enduro VR46 Racing Team	Ducati	13	+3.526	5	6
5	37	(Spain) Pedro Acosta	Red Bull KTM Factory Racing	KTM	13	+6.834	9	5
6	54	(Spain) Fermín Aldeguer	BK8 Gresini Racing MotoGP	Ducati	13	+6.960	10	4
7	10	(Italy) Luca Marini	Honda HRC Castrol	Honda	13	+9.307	6	3
8	1	(Spain) Jorge Martín	Aprilia Racing	Aprilia	13	+11.027	11	2
9	25	(Spain) Raúl Fernández	Trackhouse MotoGP Team	Aprilia	13	+11.594	13	1
10	23	(Italy) Enea Bastianini	Red Bull KTM Tech3	KTM	13	+12.928	19	
11	5	(France) Johann Zarco	LCR Honda Castrol	Honda	13	+15.490	18	
12	79	(Japan) Ai Ogura	Trackhouse MotoGP Team	Aprilia	13	+15.600	14	
13	63	(Italy) Francesco Bagnaia	Ducati Lenovo Team	Ducati	13	+16.129	8	
14	43	(Australia) Jack Miller	Prima Pramac Yamaha MotoGP	Yamaha	13	+16.727	20	
15	12	(Spain) Maverick Viñales	Red Bull KTM Tech3	KTM	13	+16.861	16	
16	88	(Portugal) Miguel Oliveira	Prima Pramac Yamaha MotoGP	Yamaha	13	+17.576	12	
17	42	(Spain) Álex Rins	Monster Energy Yamaha MotoGP Team	Yamaha	13	+18.716	17	
18	7	(Spain) Augusto Fernández	Yamaha Factory Racing	Yamaha	13	+27.893	21	
19	35	(Thailand) Somkiat Chantra	IDEMITSU Honda LCR	Honda	13	+28.333	22	
Ret	33	(South Africa) Brad Binder	Red Bull KTM Factory Racing	KTM	9	Technical issue	15	
Ret	93	(Spain) Marc Márquez	Ducati Lenovo Team	Ducati	5	Accident	4	
Ret	20	(France) Fabio Quartararo	Monster Energy Yamaha MotoGP Team	Yamaha	5	Accident	3	
DNS	36	(Spain) Joan Mir	Honda HRC Castrol	Honda		Rider unwell^{1}	—	
Fastest sprint lap: (Italy) Marco Bezzecchi (Aprilia) – 1:30.970 (lap 3)
OFFICIAL MOTOGP SPRINT REPORT

Notes

- ^1 - Joan Mir withdrew from the Sprint due to limited mobility in his neck. The riders behind him on the grid each moved up one position.

== Race ==
=== MotoGP ===
Pos.	No.	Rider	Team	Manufacturer	Laps	Time/Retired	Grid	Points
1	93	(Spain) Marc Márquez	Ducati Lenovo Team	Ducati	27	41:20.898	4	25
2	72	(Italy) Marco Bezzecchi	Aprilia Racing	Aprilia	27	+0.568	1	20
3	73	(Spain) Álex Márquez	BK8 Gresini Racing MotoGP	Ducati	27	+7.734	2	16
4	21	(Italy) Franco Morbidelli	Pertamina Enduro VR46 Racing Team	Ducati	27	+10.379	5	13
5	49	(Italy) Fabio Di Giannantonio	Pertamina Enduro VR46 Racing Team	Ducati	27	+11.330	7	11
6	54	(Spain) Fermín Aldeguer	BK8 Gresini Racing MotoGP	Ducati	27	+16.069	10	10
7	10	(Italy) Luca Marini	Honda HRC Castrol	Honda	27	+17.965	6	9
8	20	(France) Fabio Quartararo	Monster Energy Yamaha MotoGP Team	Yamaha	27	+20.964	3	8
9	88	(Portugal) Miguel Oliveira	Prima Pramac Yamaha MotoGP	Yamaha	27	+21.565	13	7
10	33	(South Africa) Brad Binder	Red Bull KTM Factory Racing	KTM	27	+23.109	16	6
11	25	(Spain) Raúl Fernández	Trackhouse MotoGP Team	Aprilia	27	+24.592	14	5
12	43	(Australia) Jack Miller	Prima Pramac Yamaha MotoGP	Yamaha	27	+27.492	21	4
13	1	(Spain) Jorge Martín	Aprilia Racing	Aprilia	27	+29.937	11	3
14	7	(Spain) Augusto Fernández	Yamaha Factory Racing	Yamaha	27	+1:01.504	22	2
15	35	(Thailand) Somkiat Chantra	IDEMITSU Honda LCR	Honda	27	+1:01.932	23	1
16	5	(France) Johann Zarco	LCR Honda Castrol	Honda	26	+1 lap	19	
Ret	23	(Italy) Enea Bastianini	Red Bull KTM Tech3	KTM	11	Accident	20	
Ret	42	(Spain) Álex Rins	Monster Energy Yamaha MotoGP Team	Yamaha	9	Accident	18	
Ret	63	(Italy) Francesco Bagnaia	Ducati Lenovo Team	Ducati	8	Accident	8	
Ret	37	(Spain) Pedro Acosta	Red Bull KTM Factory Racing	KTM	7	Snapped Chain	9	
Ret	12	(Spain) Maverick Viñales	Red Bull KTM Tech3	KTM	4	Accident	17	
Ret	79	(Japan) Ai Ogura	Trackhouse MotoGP Team	Aprilia	2	Accident	15	
Ret	36	(Spain) Joan Mir	Honda HRC Castrol	Honda	0	Collision	12	
Fastest lap: (Spain) Marc Márquez (Ducati) – 1:31.290 (lap 25)
OFFICIAL MOTOGP RACE REPORT

== Championship standings after the race ==
Below are the standings for the top five riders, constructors, and teams after the round.

=== MotoGP ===
Riders' Championship standings

Pos.	Rider	Points
1	(Spain) Marc Márquez	512
2	(Spain) Álex Márquez	330
3	(Italy) Francesco Bagnaia	237
4	(Italy) Marco Bezzecchi	229
5	(Spain) Pedro Acosta	188

Constructors' Championship standings

Pos.	Constructor	Points
1	(Italy) Ducati	575
2	(Italy) Aprilia	271
3	(Austria) KTM	248
4	(Japan) Honda	198
5	(Japan) Yamaha	168

Teams' Championship standings

Pos.	Team	Points
1	(Italy) Ducati Lenovo Team	749
2	(Italy) BK8 Gresini Racing MotoGP	471
3	(Italy) Pertamina Enduro VR46 Racing Team	359
4	(Austria) Red Bull KTM Factory Racing	289
5	(Italy) Aprilia Racing	271

=== Moto2 ===
Riders' Championship standings

	Pos.	Rider	Points
	1	(Spain) Manuel González	227
1	2	(Brazil) Diogo Moreira	188
1	3	(Spain) Arón Canet	188
	4	(Belgium) Barry Baltus	173
	5	(United Kingdom) Jake Dixon	152

Constructors' Championship standings

Pos.	Constructor	Points
1	(Germany) Kalex	378
2	(Italy) Boscoscuro	235
3	(Switzerland) Forward	13

Teams' Championship standings

	Pos.	Team	Points
	1	(Italy) Fantic Racing Lino Sonego	361
	2	(Germany) Liqui Moly Dynavolt Intact GP	331
	3	(Belgium) Elf Marc VDS Racing Team	231
1	4	(Spain) CFMoto Inde Aspar Team	212
1	5	(Italy) Beta Tools SpeedRS Team	209

=== Moto3 ===
Riders' Championship standings

Pos.	Rider	Points
1	(Spain) José Antonio Rueda	295
2	(Spain) Ángel Piqueras	217
3	(Spain) Máximo Quiles	188
4	(Spain) David Muñoz	172
5	(Spain) Álvaro Carpe	155

Constructors' Championship standings

Pos.	Constructor	Points
1	(Austria) KTM	400
2	(Japan) Honda	201

Teams' Championship standings

Pos.	Team	Points
1	(Finland) Red Bull KTM Ajo	450
2	(Spain) Frinsa – MT Helmets – MSi	322
3	(Spain) CFMoto Gaviota Aspar Team	272
4	(Germany) Liqui Moly Dynavolt Intact GP	240
5	(Luxembourg) Leopard Racing	219

=== MotoE ===
Riders' Championship standings

	Pos.	Rider	Points
2	1	(Italy) Alessandro Zaccone	160
1	2	(Italy) Mattia Casadei	155
2	3	(Italy) Matteo Ferrari	148
2	4	(Italy) Lorenzo Baldassarri	148
1	5	(Brazil) Eric Granado	142

Teams' Championship standings

	Pos.	Team	Points
	1	(Monaco) LCR E-Team	297
	2	(Germany) Dynavolt Intact GP	248
2	3	(Italy) Aruba Cloud MotoE Team	202
2	4	(Italy) Felo Gresini MotoE	195
2	5	(Spain) Power Electronics Aspar Team	195

Previous race: 2025 Catalan Grand Prix	FIM Grand Prix World Championship; 2025 season	Next race: 2025 Japanese Grand Prix
Previous race: 2024 San Marino Grand Prix	San Marino and Rimini Riviera motorcycle Grand Prix	Next race: 2026 San Marino Grand Prix
