= 2025 Valencian Community motorcycle Grand Prix =

Motorcycle races in Cheste

2025 Valencian Community Grand Prix
Race details
- Race 22 of 22 races in the 2025 Grand Prix motorcycle racing season
- Date: 16 November 2025
- Official name: Motul Grand Prix of the Valencian Community
- Location: Circuit Ricardo Tormo; Cheste, Valencia, Spain
- Course: Permanent racing facility; 4.005 km (2.489 mi)

MotoGP
Pole position
Rider	(Italy) Marco Bezzecchi	Aprilia
Time	1:28.809	
Fastest lap
Rider	(Spain) Raúl Fernández	Aprilia
Time	1:29.976 on lap 4	
Podium
First	(Italy) Marco Bezzecchi	Aprilia
Second	(Spain) Raúl Fernández	Aprilia
Third	(Italy) Fabio Di Giannantonio	Ducati

Moto2
Pole position
Rider	(Spain) Daniel Holgado	Kalex
Time	1:31.715	
Fastest lap
Rider	(Spain) Iván Ortolá	Boscoscuro
Time	1:32.773 on lap 2	
Podium
First	(Spain) Izan Guevara	Boscoscuro
Second	(Spain) Daniel Holgado	Kalex
Third	(Spain) Iván Ortolá	Boscoscuro

Moto3
Pole position
Rider	(Spain) Adrián Fernández	Honda
Time	1:36.990	
Fastest lap
Rider	(Spain) Álvaro Carpe	KTM
Time	1:37.715 on lap 14	
Podium
First	(Spain) Adrián Fernández	Honda
Second	(Spain) Álvaro Carpe	KTM
Third	(Japan) Taiyo Furusato	Honda

The 2025 Valencian Community motorcycle Grand Prix (officially known as the Motul Grand Prix of the Valencian Community) was the twenty-second and final round of the 2025 Grand Prix motorcycle racing season. All races were held at the Circuit Ricardo Tormo in Cheste on 16 November 2025.

This Grand Prix marked the return of MotoGP in Valencia, as the 2024 edition was cancelled due to flooding in the region and was replaced by the 2024 Solidarity motorcycle Grand Prix.

Even though he did not take part in the race, Marc Márquez was still present at this race. Márquez won the 2025 BMW M Award with 351 points, finishing eight points ahead of his brother Álex in second place. As in the races, MotoGP™ riders receive points for the BMW M Award according to their qualifying positions.

== Background ==
In this race, the defending champion Jorge Martín made his comeback in this race after being absent since his crash during the sprint at Motegi, which resulted in a broken right collarbone. Yamaha Factory Racing fielded Augusto Fernández as a wildcard for YZR-M1 V4 to deciding the “direction” of development for 2026. Honda fielded Aleix Espargaro with the latest development version of the RC213V motorbike for 2026. Then, Nicolò Bulega remained Marc Márquez replacement rider in the season finale for the Ducati Lenovo Team.

In the Moto2, Héctor Garzó was selected as a wildcard rider for RW NTS Idrofolgia to test the NTS chassis.

== Report ==
=== MotoGP ===
Aprilia Racing rider Marco Bezzecchi secured pole after setting the fastest time in qualifying. The Italian rider was followed by BK8 Gresini Racing rider Álex Márquez in second, and Pertamina Enduro VR46 Racing Team rider Fabio Di Giannantonio in third. Meanwhile, Trackhouse Racing rider Raúl Fernández and Red Bull KTM Factory Racing rider Pedro Acosta finished fourth and fifth, respectively.

In the sprint race, Álex Márquez finished first, Pedro Acosta finished second, and Fabio Di Giannantonio finished third.

=== Moto2 ===
During the first free practice session, an incident between Ayumu Sasaki and Adrián Huertas resulted in a red flag subsequent delays for next several sessions. Sasaki was fine, but Huertas broke both collarbones and required immediate surgery.

=== Moto3 ===
In qualifying, Adrián Fernández secured pole position after outpacing his teammate, David Almansa. He set a new all-time lap record of 1 minute 36.990 seconds. This was the first time a Moto3 rider has broken the 1 minute 36 second mark.

== Practice session ==
=== MotoGP ===
==== Combined Free Practice 1-2 ====
Practice times (written in bold) are the fastest times in the session.

Fastest session lap

Pos.	No.	Biker	Team	Constructor	Practice times	
Pos.	No.	Biker	Team	Constructor	FP1	FP2
1	79	(Japan) Ai Ogura	Trackhouse MotoGP Team	Aprilia	1:30.705	**1:29.897**
2	63	(Italy) Francesco Bagnaia	Ducati Lenovo Team	Ducati	1:31.528	**1:29.996**
3	72	(Italy) Marco Bezzecchi	Aprilia Racing	Aprilia	1:31.364	**1:30.104**
4	21	(Italy) Franco Morbidelli	Pertamina Enduro VR46 Racing Team	Ducati	1:30.860	**1:30.186**
5	37	(Spain) Pedro Acosta	Red Bull KTM Factory Racing	KTM	1:30.998	**1:30.240**
6	73	(Spain) Álex Márquez	BK8 Gresini Racing MotoGP	Ducati	1:30.884	**1:30.296**
7	20	(France) Fabio Quartararo	Monster Energy Yamaha MotoGP Team	Yamaha	1:31.204	**1:30.303**
8	54	(Spain) Fermín Aldeguer	BK8 Gresini Racing MotoGP	Ducati	1:31.113	**1:30.371**
9	41	(Spain) Aleix Espargaró	Honda HRC Test Team	Honda	1:30.707	**1:30.372**
10	43	(Australia) Jack Miller	Prima Pramac Yamaha MotoGP	Yamaha	**1:30.382**	1:30.579
11	25	(Spain) Raúl Fernández	Trackhouse MotoGP Team	Aprilia	1:30.800	**1:30.441**
12	1	(Spain) Jorge Martín	Aprilia Racing	Aprilia	1:31.923	**1:30.520**
13	36	(Spain) Joan Mir	Honda HRC Castrol	Honda	1:30.926	**1:30.542**
14	49	(Italy) Fabio Di Giannantonio	Pertamina Enduro VR46 Racing Team	Ducati	1:31.033	**1:30.580**
15	23	(Italy) Enea Bastianini	Red Bull KTM Tech3	KTM	1:31.326	**1:30.776**
16	12	(Spain) Maverick Viñales	Red Bull KTM Tech3	KTM	1:31.430	**1:30.809**
17	5	(France) Johann Zarco	Castrol Honda LCR	Honda	1:31.171	**1:30.810**
18	11	(Italy) Nicolò Bulega	Ducati Lenovo Team	Ducati	1:31.766	**1:30.851**
19	7	(Spain) Augusto Fernández	Yamaha Factory Team	Yamaha	1:31.035	**1:30.876**
20	10	(Italy) Luca Marini	Honda HRC Castrol	Honda	1:31.146	**1:30.938**
21	88	(Portugal) Miguel Oliveira	Prima Pramac Yamaha MotoGP	Yamaha	1:31.715	**1:30.975**
22	33	(South Africa) Brad Binder	Red Bull KTM Factory Racing	KTM	1:31.319	**1:31.049**
23	42	(Spain) Álex Rins	Monster Energy Yamaha MotoGP Team	Yamaha	1:31.301	**1:31.252**
24	35	(Thailand) Somkiat Chantra	IDEMITSU Honda LCR	Honda	1:31.454	**1:31.412**
OFFICIAL MOTOGP COMBINED PRACTICE TIMES REPORT

==== Practice ====
The top 10 riders (written in bold) qualified for Q2.

Fastest session lap

Pos.	No.	Biker	Team	Constructor	
Pos.	No.	Biker	Team	Constructor	Time results
1	37	(Spain) **Pedro Acosta**	**Red Bull KTM Factory Racing**	**KTM**	**1:29.240**
2	72	(Italy) **Marco Bezzecchi**	**Aprilia Racing**	**Aprilia**	**1:29.293**
3	21	(Italy) **Franco Morbidelli**	**Pertamina Enduro VR46 Racing Team**	**Ducati**	**1:29.425**
4	73	(Spain) **Álex Márquez**	**BK8 Gresini Racing MotoGP**	**Ducati**	**1:29.473**
5	79	(Japan) **Ai Ogura**	**Trackhouse MotoGP Team**	**Aprilia**	**1:29.555**
6	43	(Australia) **Jack Miller**	**Prima Pramac Yamaha MotoGP**	**Yamaha**	**1:29.556**
7	49	(Italy) **Fabio Di Giannantonio**	**Pertamina Enduro VR46 Racing Team**	**Ducati**	**1:29.593**
8	54	(Spain) **Fermín Aldeguer**	**BK8 Gresini Racing MotoGP**	**Ducati**	**1:29.597**
9	36	(Spain) **Joan Mir**	**Honda HRC Castrol**	**Honda**	**1:29.634**
10	20	(France) **Fabio Quartararo**	**Monster Energy Yamaha MotoGP Team**	**Yamaha**	**1:29.673**
11	33	(South Africa) Brad Binder	Red Bull KTM Factory Racing	KTM	1:29.729
12	25	(Spain) Raúl Fernández	Trackhouse MotoGP Team	Aprilia	1:29.806
13	41	(Spain) Aleix Espargaró	Honda HRC Test Team	Honda	1:29.832
14	63	(Italy) Francesco Bagnaia	Ducati Lenovo Team	Ducati	1:29.833
15	5	(France) Johann Zarco	CASTROL Honda LCR	Honda	1:29.891
16	10	(Italy) Luca Marini	Honda HRC Castrol	Honda	1:29.896
17	42	(Spain) Álex Rins	Monster Energy Yamaha MotoGP Team	Yamaha	1:29.999
18	12	(Spain) Maverick Viñales	Red Bull KTM Tech3	KTM	1:30.147
19	23	(Italy) Enea Bastianini	Red Bull KTM Tech3	KTM	1:30.237
20	7	(Spain) Augusto Fernández	Yamaha Factory Racing Team	Yamaha	1:30.267
21	88	(Portugal) Miguel Oliveira	Prima Pramac Yamaha MotoGP	Yamaha	1:30.304
22	1	(Spain) Jorge Martín	Aprilia Racing	Aprilia	1:30.404
23	35	(Thailand) Somkiat Chantra	IDEMITSU Honda LCR	Honda	1:30.529
24	11	(Italy) Nicolò Bulega	Ducati Lenovo Team	Ducati	1:30.552
OFFICIAL MOTOGP PRACTICE TIMES REPORT

=== Moto2 ===
==== Combined Free Practice 1-2 ====
Practice times (written in bold) are the fastest times in the session.

Fastest session lap

Pos.	No.	Biker	Team	Constructor	Practice times	
Pos.	No.	Biker	Team	Constructor	FP1	FP2
1	17	(Spain) Daniel Muñoz	Red Bull KTM Ajo	Kalex	1:33.310	**1:32.372**
2	28	(Spain) Izan Guevara	Blu Cru Pramac Yamaha Moto2	Boscoscuro	1:35.866	**1:32.454**
3	75	(Spain) Albert Arenas	Italjet Gresini Moto2	Kalex	1:33.439	**1:32.463**
4	18	(Spain) Manuel González	Liqui Moly Dynavolt Intact GP	Kalex	1:33.189	**1:32.518**
5	95	(Netherlands) Collin Veijer	Red Bull KTM Ajo	Kalex	1:33.617	**1:32.688**
6	3	(Spain) Sergio García	Italjet Gresini Moto2	Kalex	1:33.351	**1:32.743**
7	10	(Brazil) Diogo Moreira	Italtrans Racing Team	Kalex	1:33.357	**1:32.818**
8	27	(Spain) Daniel Holgado	CFMoto Inde Aspar Team	Kalex	1:33.378	**1:32.865**
9	96	(United Kingdom) Jake Dixon	Elf Marc VDS Racing Team	Boscoscuro	1:33.416	**1:32.865**
10	14	(Italy) Tony Arbolino	Blu Cru Pramac Yamaha Moto2	Boscoscuro	1:33.569	**1:32.872**
11	11	(Spain) Álex Escrig	Klint Forward Factory Team	Forward	1:33.050	**1:32.954**
12	80	(Colombia) David Alonso	CFMoto Inde Aspar Team	Kalex	1:33.498	**1:32.959**
13	24	(Spain) Marcos Ramírez	OnlyFans American Racing Team	Kalex	1:33.795	**1:32.992**
14	81	(Australia) Senna Agius	Liqui Moly Dynavolt Intact GP	Kalex	1:33.645	**1:33.027**
15	12	(Czech Republic) Filip Salač	Elf Marc VDS Racing Team	Boscoscuro	1:33.781	**1:33.131**
16	7	(Belgium) Barry Baltus	Fantic Racing	Kalex	1:33.549	**1:33.158**
17	64	(Indonesia) Mario Aji	Idemitsu Honda Team Asia	Kalex	1:34.251	**1:33.306**
18	13	(Italy) Celestino Vietti	Sync SpeedRS Team	Boscoscuro	1:33.725	**1:33.381**
19	21	(Spain) Alonso López	Sync SpeedRS Team	Boscoscuro	1:33.461	**1:33.390**
20	9	(Spain) Jorge Navarro	Klint Forward Factory Team	Forward	1:34.946	**1:33.413**
21	61	(Spain) Eric Fernández	QJMotor – Frinsa – MSi	Boscoscuro	1:34.375	**1:33.503**
22	4	(Spain) Iván Ortolá	QJMotor – Frinsa – MSi	Boscoscuro	1:33.769	**1:33.506**
23	44	(Spain) Arón Canet	Fantic Racing	Kalex	1:33.576	**1:33.512**
24	16	(United States) Xabi Zurutuza	OnlyFans American Racing Team	Kalex	1:34.618	**1:33.653**
25	92	(Japan) Yuki Kunii	Idemitsu Honda Team Asia	Kalex	**1:34.839**	1:33.742
26	84	(Netherlands) Zonta van den Goorbergh	RW-Idrofoglia Racing GP	Kalex	1:34.562	**1:33.824**
27	22	(Spain) Héctor Garzó	RW NTS Idrofolglia	NTS	1:35.365	**1:34.118**
	71	(Japan) Ayumu Sasaki	RW-Idrofoglia Racing GP	Kalex	Not classified^{1}	
	99	(Spain) Adrián Huertas	Italtrans Racing Team	Kalex	Not classified^{1}	
OFFICIAL MOTO2 FREE PRACTICE TIMES REPORT

Notes

- **^1** - Ayumu Sasaki and Adrián Huertas withdrew from the weekend after collision in a crash on Friday.

==== Practice ====
The top 14 riders (written in bold) qualified for Q2.

Fastest session lap

Pos.	No.	Biker	Team	Constructor	
Pos.	No.	Biker	Team	Constructor	Time results
1	27	(Spain) **Daniel Holgado**	**CFMoto Inde Aspar Team**	**Kalex**	**1:32.408**
2	96	(United Kingdom) **Jake Dixon**	**Elf Marc VDS Racing Team**	**Boscoscuro**	1:32.531
3	17	(Spain) **Daniel Muñoz**	**Red Bull KTM Ajo**	**Kalex**	1:32.584
4	28	(Spain) **Izan Guevara**	**Blu Cru Pramac Yamaha Moto2**	**Boscoscuro**	1:32.636
5	11	(Spain) **Álex Escrig**	**Klint Forward Factory Team**	**Forward**	1:32.662
6	81	(Australia) **Senna Agius**	**Liqui Moly Dynavolt Intact GP**	**Kalex**	1:32.684
7	13	(Italy) **Celestino Vietti**	**Sync SpeedRS Team**	**Boscoscuro**	1:32.753
8	7	(Belgium) **Barry Baltus**	**Fantic Racing**	**Kalex**	1:32.765
9	14	(Italy) **Tony Arbolino**	**Blu Cru Pramac Yamaha Moto2**	**Boscoscuro**	1:32.782
10	18	(Spain) **Manuel González**	**Liqui Moly Dynavolt Intact GP**	**Kalex**	1:32.788
11	95	(Netherlands) **Collin Veijer**	**Red Bull KTM Ajo**	**Kalex**	1:32.822
12	3	(Spain) **Sergio García**	**Italjet Gresini Moto2**	**Kalex**	1:32.829
13	4	(Spain) **Iván Ortolá**	**QJMotor – Frinsa – MSi**	**Boscoscuro**	1:32.845
14	24	(Spain) **Marcos Ramírez**	**OnlyFans American Racing Team**	**Kalex**	1:32.853
15	12	(Czech Republic) Filip Salač	Elf Marc VDS Racing Team	Boscoscuro	1:32.857
16	44	(Spain) Arón Canet	Fantic Racing	Kalex	1:32.879
17	21	(Spain) Alonso López	Sync SpeedRS Team	Boscoscuro	1:32.989
18	75	(Spain) Albert Arenas	Italjet Gresini Moto2	Kalex	1:32.992
19	10	(Brazil) Diogo Moreira	Italtrans Racing Team	Kalex	1:33.041
20	64	(Indonesia) Mario Aji	Idemitsu Honda Team Asia	Kalex	1:33.060
21	80	(Colombia) David Alonso	CFMoto Inde Aspar Team	Kalex	1:33.112
22	9	(Spain) Jorge Navarro	Klint Forward Factory Team	Forward	1:33.424
23	84	(Netherlands) Zonta van den Goorbergh	RW-Idrofoglia Racing GP	Kalex	1:33.630
24	92	(Japan) Yuki Kunii	Idemitsu Honda Team Asia	Kalex	1:33.653
25	85	(Spain) Xabi Zurutuza	OnlyFans American Racing Team	Kalex	1:33.911
26	61	(Spain) Eric Fernández	QJMotor – Frinsa – MSi	Boscoscuro	1:34.081
27	22	(Spain) Héctor Garzó	RW NTS Idrofoglia	NTS	1:34.233
OFFICIAL MOTO2 PRACTICE TIMES REPORT

=== Moto3 ===
==== Combined Free Practice 1-2 ====
Practice times (written in bold) are the fastest times in the session.

Fastest session lap

Pos.	No.	Biker	Team	Constructor	Practice times	
Pos.	No.	Biker	Team	Constructor	FP1	FP2
1	22	(Spain) David Almansa	Leopard Racing	Honda	1:39.081	1:37.584
2	31	(Spain) Adrián Fernández	Leopard Racing	Honda	1:38.669	1:37.789
3	58	(Italy) Luca Lunetta	Sic58 Squadra Corse	Honda	1:39.485	1:37.819
4	28	(Spain) Máximo Quiles	CFMoto Valresa Aspar Team	KTM	1:38.765	1:37.902
5	51	(Spain) Brian Uriarte	Red Bull KTM Ajo	KTM	1:39.646	1:37.949
6	66	(Australia) Joel Kelso	LEVELUP-MTA	KTM	1:38.443	1:37.990
7	73	(Argentina) Valentín Perrone	Red Bull KTM Tech3	KTM	1:38.874	1:38.097
8	83	(Spain) Álvaro Carpe	Red Bull KTM Ajo	KTM	1:38.357	1:38.172
9	45	(Spain) Jesús Ríos	Rivacold Snipers Team	Honda	1:39.972	1:38.182
10	18	(Italy) Matteo Bertelle	LEVELUP-MTA	KTM	1:40.685	1:38.208
11	82	(Italy) Stefano Nepa	Sic58 Squadra Corse	Honda	1:40.178	1:38.212
12	11	(Spain) Adrián Cruces	CIP Green Power	KTM	1:39.791	1:38.227
13	71	(Italy) Dennis Foggia	CFMoto Valresa Aspar Team	KTM	1:40.505	1:38.270
14	94	(Italy) Guido Pini	Liqui Moly Dynavolt Intact GP	KTM	1:39.419	1:38.282
15	67	(Republic of Ireland) Casey O'Gorman	Liqui Moly Dynavolt Intact GP	KTM	1:39.416	1:38.363
16	72	(Japan) Taiyo Furusato	Honda Team Asia	Honda	1:40.613	1:38.368
17	36	(Spain) Ángel Piqueras	Frinsa – MT Helmets – MSI	KTM	1:39.701	1:38.436
18	19	(United Kingdom) Scott Ogden	CIP Green Power	KTM	1:39.302	1:38.506
19	8	(United Kingdom) Eddie O'Shea	GRYD - Mlav Racing	Honda	1:40.127	1:38.508
20	12	(Australia) Jacob Roulstone	Red Bull KTM Tech3	KTM	1:40:785	1:38.645
21	95	(Argentina) Marco Morelli	GRYD - Mlav Racing	Honda	1:39.747	1:38.651
22	10	(Italy) Nicola Carraro	Rivacold Snipers Team	Honda	1:40.346	1:38.778
23	2	(Japan) Zen Mitani	Honda Team Asia	Honda	1:40.522	1:38.800
24	21	(South Africa) Ruché Moodley	Denssi Racing – BOE	KTM	1:39.711	1:38.918
25	14	(New Zealand) Cormac Buchanan	Denssi Racing – BOE	KTM	1:41.675	1:39.363
26	6	(Malaysia) Hakim Danish	Frinsa – MT Helmets – MSI	KTM	1:43.258	1:39.626
OFFICIAL MOTO3 FREE PRACTICE TIMES REPORT

==== Practice ====
The top 14 riders (written in bold) qualified for Q2.

Fastest session lap

Pos.	No.	Biker	Team	Constructor	
Pos.	No.	Biker	Team	Constructor	Time results
1	22	(Spain) **David Almansa**	**Leopard Racing**	**Honda**	**1:37.333**
2	31	(Spain) **Adrián Fernández**	**Leopard Racing**	**Honda**	1:37.643
3	73	(Argentina) **Valentín Perrone**	**Red Bull KTM Tech3**	**KTM**	1:37.822
4	94	(Italy) **Guido Pini**	**Liqui Moly Dynavolt Intact GP**	**KTM**	1:37.856
5	72	**(Japan) Taiyo Furusato**	**Honda Team Asia**	**Honda**	1:37.912
6	83	(Spain) **Álvaro Carpe**	**Red Bull KTM Ajo**	**KTM**	1:38.019
7	45	(Spain) **Jesús Ríos**	**Rivacold Snipers Team**	**Honda**	1:38.126
8	28	(Spain) **Máximo Quiles**	**CFMoto Valresa Aspar Team**	**KTM**	1:38.130
9	36	(Spain) **Ángel Piqueras**	**Frinsa – MT Helmets – MSI**	**KTM**	1:38.170
10	66	(Australia) **Joel Kelso**	**LEVELUP-MTA**	**KTM**	1:38.338
11	11	(Spain) **Adrián Cruces**	**CIP Green Power**	**KTM**	1:38.346
12	67	(Republic of Ireland) **Casey O'Gorman**	**Liqui Moly Dynavolt Intact GP**	**KTM**	1:38.347
13	95	(Argentina) **Marco Morelli**	**GRYD - Mlav Racing**	**Honda**	1:38.440
14	58	(Italy) **Luca Lunetta**	**Sic58 Squadra Corse**	**Honda**	1:38.449
15	12	(Australia) Jacob Roulstone	Red Bull KTM Tech3	KTM	1:38.518
16	51	(Spain) Brian Uriarte	Red Bull KTM Ajo	KTM	1:38.539
17	82	(Italy) Stefano Nepa	Sic58 Squadra Corse	Honda	1:38.549
18	18	(Italy) Matteo Bertelle	LEVELUP–MTA	KTM	1:38.597
19	19	(United Kingdom) Scott Ogden	CIP Green Power	KTM	1:38.667
20	8	(United Kingdom) Eddie O'Shea	GRYD - Mlav Racing	Honda	1:38.771
21	10	(Italy) Nicola Carraro	Rivacold Snipers Team	Honda	1:38.777
22	71	(Italy) Dennis Foggia	CFMoto Valresa Aspar Team	KTM	1:38.844
23	13	(Malaysia) Hakim Danish	Frinsa – MT Helmets – MSI	KTM	1:39.068
24	21	(South Africa) Ruché Moodley	Denssi Racing – BOE	KTM	1:39.081
25	2	(Japan) Zen Mitani	Honda Team Asia	Honda	1:39.175
26	14	(New Zealand) Cormac Buchanan	Denssi Racing – BOE	KTM	1:39.775
OFFICIAL MOTO3 PRACTICE TIMES REPORT

== Qualifying ==
=== MotoGP ===
Fastest session lap

Pos.	No.	Biker	Team	Constructor	Qualifying times		Final grid	Row
Pos.	No.	Biker	Team	Constructor	Q1	Q2	Final grid	Row
1	72	(Italy) Marco Bezzecchi	Aprilia Racing	Aprilia	Qualified in Q2	1:28.809	1	1
2	73	(Spain) Álex Márquez	BK8 Gresini Racing MotoGP	Ducati	Qualified in Q2	1:28.835	2	1
3	49	(Italy) Fabio Di Giannantonio	Pertamina Enduro VR46 Racing Team	Ducati	Qualified in Q2	1:28.853	3	1
4	25	(Spain) Raúl Fernández	Trackhouse MotoGP Team	Aprilia	1:29.036	1:28.867	4	2
5	37	(Spain) Pedro Acosta	Red Bull KTM Factory Racing	KTM	Qualified in Q2	1:28.905	5	2
6	20	(France) Fabio Quartararo	Monster Energy Yamaha MotoGP Team	Yamaha	Qualified in Q2	1:28.978	6	2
7	21	(Italy) Franco Morbidelli	Pertamina Enduro VR46 Racing Team	Ducati	Qualified in Q2	1:29.066	7	3
8	43	(Australia) Jack Miller	Prima Pramac Yamaha MotoGP	Yamaha	Qualified in Q2	1:29.144	8	3
9	54	(Spain) Fermín Aldeguer	BK8 Gresini Racing MotoGP	Ducati	Qualified in Q2	1:29.169	9	3
10	36	(Spain) Joan Mir	Honda HRC Castrol	Honda	Qualified in Q2	1:29.233	10	4
11	5	(France) Johann Zarco	Castrol Honda LCR	Honda	1:29.650	1:29.351	11	4
12	79	(Japan) Ai Ogura	Trackhouse MotoGP Team	Aprilia	Qualified in Q2	1:29.371	12	4
13	10	(Italy) Luca Marini	Honda HRC Castrol	Honda	1:29.520	N/A	13	5
14	41	(Spain) Aleix Espargaró	Honda HRC Test Team	Honda	1:29.526	N/A	14	5
15	33	(South Africa) Brad Binder	Red Bull KTM Factory Racing	KTM	1.29.561	N/A	15	5
16	63	(Italy) Francesco Bagnaia	Ducati Lenovo Team	Ducati	1:29.584	N/A	16	6
17	1	(Spain) Jorge Martín	Aprilia Racing	Aprilia	1:29.630	N/A	17	6
18	88	(Portugal) Miguel Oliveira	Prima Pramac Yamaha MotoGP	Yamaha	1:29.657	N/A	18	6
19	42	(Spain) Álex Rins	Monster Energy Yamaha MotoGP Team	Yamaha	1:29.907	N/A	19	7
20	23	(Italy) Enea Bastianini	Red Bull KTM Tech3	KTM	1:29.948	N/A	20	7
21	12	(Spain) Maverick Viñales	Red Bull KTM Tech3	KTM	1:29.987	N/A	21	7
22	11	(Italy) Nicolò Bulega	Ducati Lenovo Team	Ducati	1:30.045	N/A	22	8
23	7	(Spain) Augusto Fernández	Yamaha Factory Racing Team	Yamaha	1:30.110	N/A	23	8
24	35	(Thailand) Somkiat Chantra	IDEMITSU Honda LCR	Honda	1:30.257	N/A	24	8
OFFICIAL MOTOGP QUALIFYING TIMES REPORT

=== Moto2 ===
Fastest session lap

Pos.	No.	Biker	Team	Constructor	Qualifying times		Final grid	Row
Pos.	No.	Biker	Team	Constructor	Q1	Q2	Final grid	Row
1	27	(Spain) Daniel Holgado	CFMoto Inde Aspar Team	Kalex	Qualified in Q2	1:31.715	1	1
2	28	(Spain) Izan Guevara	Blu Cru Pramac Yamaha Moto2	Boscoscuro	Qualified in Q2	1:31.873	2	1
3	81	(Australia) Senna Agius	Liqui Moly Dynavolt Intact GP	Kalex	Qualified in Q2	1:31.886	3	1
4	75	(Spain) Albert Arenas	Italjet Gresini Moto2	Kalex	1:32.177	1:32.020	4	2
5	18	(Spain) Manuel González	Liqui Moly Dynavolt Intact GP	Kalex	Qualified in Q2	1:32.065	5	2
6	11	(Spain) Álex Escrig	Klint Forward Factory Team	Forward	Qualified in Q2	1:32.077	6	2
7	95	(Netherlands) Collin Veijer	Red Bull KTM Ajo	Kalex	Qualified in Q2	1:32.098	7	3
8	17	(Spain) Daniel Muñoz	Red Bull KTM Ajo	Kalex	Qualified in Q2	1:32.109	8	3
9	10	(Brazil) Diogo Moreira	Italtrans Racing Team	Kalex	1:32.459	1:32.131	9	3
10	13	(Italy) Celestino Vietti	Sync SpeedRS Team	Boscoscuro	Qualified in Q2	1:32.157	10	4
11	4	(Spain) Iván Ortolá	QJMotor – Frinsa – MSi	Boscoscuro	Qualified in Q2	1:32.258	11	4
12	44	(Spain) Arón Canet	Fantic Racing	Kalex	1:32.413	1:32.313	12	4
13	12	(Czech Republic) Filip Salač	Elf Marc VDS Racing Team	Boscoscuro	1:32.524	1:32.318	13	5
14	7	(Belgium) Barry Baltus	Fantic Racing	Kalex	Qualified in Q2	1:32.387	14	5
15	14	(Italy) Tony Arbolino	Blu Cru Pramac Yamaha Moto2	Boscoscuro	Qualified in Q2	1:32.457	15	5
16	3	(Spain) Sergio García	Italjet Gresini Moto2	Kalex	Qualified in Q2	1:32.486	16	6
17	96	(United Kingdom) Jake Dixon	Elf Marc VDS Racing Team	Boscoscuro	Qualified in Q2	1:32.527	17	6
18	24	(Spain) Marcos Ramírez	OnlyFans American Racing Team	Kalex	Qualified in Q2	1:32.618	18	6
19	21	(Spain) Alonso López	Sync SpeedRS Team	Boscoscuro	1:32.551	N/A	19	7
20	80	(Colombia) David Alonso	CFMoto Inde Aspar Team	Kalex	1:32.633	N/A	20	7
21	84	(Netherlands) Zonta van den Goorbergh	RW-Idrofoglia Racing GP	Kalex	1:32.645	N/A	21	7
22	9	(Spain) Jorge Navarro	Klint Forward Factory Team	Forward	1:32.674	N/A	22	8
23	64	(Indonesia) Mario Aji	Idemitsu Honda Team Asia	Kalex	1:32.678	N/A	23	8
24	61	(Spain) Eric Fernández	QJMotor – Frinsa – MSi	Boscoscuro	1:32.830	N/A	24	8
25	85	(Spain) Xabi Zurutuza	OnlyFans American Racing Team	Kalex	1:33.170	N/A	25	9
26	92	(Japan) Yuki Kunii	Idemitsu Honda Team Asia	Kalex	1:33.366	N/A	26	9
27	22	(Spain) Héctor Garzó	RW NTS Idrofoglia	NTS	1:33.675	N/A	27	9
OFFICIAL MOTO2 QUALIFYING TIMES REPORT

=== Moto3 ===
Fastest session lap

Pos.	No.	Biker	Team	Constructor	Qualifying times		Final grid	Row
Pos.	No.	Biker	Team	Constructor	Q1	Q2	Final grid	Row
1	31	(Spain) Adrián Fernández	Leopard Racing	Honda	Qualified in Q2	1:36.990	1	1
2	22	(Spain) David Almansa	Leopard Racing	Honda	Qualified in Q2	1:37.126	2	1
3	28	(Spain) Máximo Quiles	CFMoto Valresa Aspar Team	KTM	Qualified in Q2	1:37.165	3	1
4	58	(Italy) Luca Lunetta	Sic58 Squadra Corse	Honda	Qualified in Q2	1:37.251	4	2
5	95	(Argentina) Marco Morelli	GRYD - Mlav Racing	Honda	Qualified in Q2	1:37.296	5	2
6	83	(Spain) Álvaro Carpe	Red Bull KTM Ajo	KTM	Qualified in Q2	2:10.296	6	2
7	82	(Italy) Stefano Nepa	Sic58 Squadra Corse	Honda	1:37.450	1:37.401	7	3
8	73	(Argentina) Valentín Perrone	Red Bull KTM Tech3	KTM	Qualified in Q2	1:37.424	8	3
9	72	(Japan) Taiyo Furusato	Honda Team Asia	Honda	Qualified in Q2	1:37.459	9	3
10	36	(Spain) Ángel Piqueras	Frinsa – MT Helmets – MSI	KTM	Qualified in Q2	1:37.468	10	4
11	11	(Spain) Adrián Cruces	CIP Green Power	KTM	Qualified in Q2	1:37.489	11	4
12	66	(Australia) Joel Kelso	LEVELUP-MTA	KTM	Qualified in Q2	1:37.500	12	4
13	51	(Spain) Brian Uriarte	Red Bull KTM Ajo	KTM	1:37.535	1:37.642	13	5
14	71	(Italy) Dennis Foggia	CFMoto Valresa Aspar Team	KTM	1:37.662	1:37.702	14	5
15	67	(Republic of Ireland) Casey O'Gorman	Liqui Moly Dynavolt Intact GP	KTM	Qualified in Q2	1:37.740	15	5
16	45	(Spain) Jesús Ríos	Rivacold Snipers Team	Honda	Qualified in Q2	1:37.777	16	6
17	94	(Italy) Guido Pini	Liqui Moly Dynavolt Intact GP	KTM	Qualified in Q2	1:37.852	17	6
18	13	(Malaysia) Hakim Danish	Frinsa – MT Helmets – MSI	KTM	1:37.791	1:37.987	18	6
19	19	(United Kingdom) Scott Ogden	CIP Green Power	KTM	1:37.806	N/A	19	7
20	10	(Italy) Nicola Carraro	Rivacold Snipers Team	Honda	1:37.958	N/A	20	7
21	18	(Italy) Matteo Bertelle	LEVELUP-MTA	KTM	1:38.086	N/A	21	7
22	21	(South Africa) Ruché Moodley	Denssi Racing – BOE	KTM	1:38.089	N/A	22	8
23	12	(Australia) Jacob Roulstone	Red Bull KTM Tech3	KTM	1:38.191	N/A	23	8
24	2	(Japan) Zen Mitani	Honda Team Asia	Honda	1:38.240	N/A	24	8
25	8	(United Kingdom) Eddie O'Shea	GRYD - Mlav Racing	Honda	1:38.500	N/A	25	9
26	14	(New Zealand) Cormac Buchanan	Denssi Racing – BOE	KTM	1:38.856	N/A	26	9
OFFICIAL MOTO3 QUALIFYING TIMES REPORT

== MotoGP Sprint ==
The MotoGP Sprint was held on 15 November 2025.

Pos.	No.	Rider	Team	Manufacturer	Laps	Time/Retired	Grid	Points
1	73	(Spain) Álex Márquez	BK8 Gresini Racing MotoGP	Ducati	13	19:37.490	2	12
2	37	(Spain) Pedro Acosta	Red Bull KTM Factory Racing	KTM	13	+1.149	5	9
3	49	(Italy) Fabio Di Giannantonio	Pertamina Enduro VR46 Racing Team	Ducati	13	+2.637	3	7
4	25	(Spain) Raúl Fernández	Trackhouse MotoGP Team	Aprilia	13	+3.519	4	6
5	72	(Italy) Marco Bezzecchi	Aprilia Racing	Aprilia	13	+3.727	1	5
6	21	(Italy) Franco Morbidelli	Pertamina Enduro VR46 Racing Team	Ducati	13	+6.349	7	4
7	20	(France) Fabio Quartararo	Monster Energy Yamaha MotoGP Team	Yamaha	13	+7.102	6	3
8	33	(South Africa) Brad Binder	Red Bull KTM Factory Racing	KTM	13	+7.352	15	2
9	79	(Japan) Ai Ogura	Trackhouse MotoGP Team	Aprilia	13	+7.685	12	1
10	5	(France) Johann Zarco	Castrol Honda LCR	Honda	13	+9.346	11	
11	54	(Spain) Fermín Aldeguer	BK8 Gresini Racing MotoGP	Ducati	13	+10.067	9	
12	43	(Australia) Jack Miller	Prima Pramac Yamaha MotoGP	Yamaha	13	+11.148	8	
13	23	(Italy) Enea Bastianini	Red Bull KTM Tech3	KTM	13	+11.911	20	
14	63	(Italy) Francesco Bagnaia	Ducati Lenovo Team	Ducati	13	+11.957	16	
15	42	(Spain) Álex Rins	Monster Energy Yamaha MotoGP Team	Yamaha	13	+14.264	19	
16	11	(Italy) Nicolò Bulega	Ducati Lenovo Team	Ducati	13	+14.951	22	
17	88	(Portugal) Miguel Oliveira	Prima Pramac Yamaha MotoGP	Yamaha	13	+15.597	18	
18	12	(Spain) Maverick Viñales	Red Bull KTM Tech3	KTM	13	+16.699	21	
19	41	(Spain) Aleix Espargaró	Honda HRC Test Team	Honda	13	+16.885	14	
20	7	(Spain) Augusto Fernández	Yamaha Factory Racing	Yamaha	13	+18.846	23	
21	35	(Thailand) Somkiat Chantra	IDEMITSU Honda LCR	Honda	13	+23.028	24	
22	1	(Spain) Jorge Martín	Aprilia Racing	Aprilia	13	+23.655	17	
Ret	10	(Italy) Luca Marini	Honda HRC Castrol	Honda	1	Collision	13	
Ret	36	(Spain) Joan Mir (Note: Long lap penalty at the main race due to making Luca Marini crash during the sprint)	Honda HRC Castrol	Honda	1	Collision	10	
Fastest sprint lap: (Spain) Álex Márquez (Ducati) – 1:29.538 (lap 2)
OFFICIAL MOTOGP SPRINT REPORT

== Warm Up ==
Pos.	No.	Biker	Team	Constructor	
Pos.	No.	Biker	Team	Constructor	Time results
1	20	(France) Fabio Quartararo	Monster Energy Yamaha MotoGP Team	Yamaha	1:30.111
2	73	(Spain) Álex Márquez	BK8 Gresini Racing MotoGP	Ducati	1:30.225
3	25	(Spain) Raúl Fernández	Trackhouse MotoGP Team	Aprilia	1:30.243
4	72	(Italy) Marco Bezzecchi	Aprilia Racing	Aprilia	1:30.280
5	49	(Italy) Fabio Di Giannantonio	Pertamina Enduro VR46 Racing Team	Ducati	1:30.324
6	37	(Spain) Pedro Acosta	Red Bull KTM Factory Racing	KTM	1:30.328
7	36	(Spain) Joan Mir	Honda HRC Castrol	Honda	1:30.349
8	54	(Spain) Fermín Aldeguer	BK8 Gresini Racing MotoGP	Ducati	1:30.404
9	43	(Australia) Jack Miller	Prima Pramac Yamaha MotoGP	Yamaha	1:30.420
10	12	(Spain) Maverick Viñales	Red Bull KTM Tech3	KTM	1:30.491
11	11	(Italy) Nicolò Bulega	Ducati Lenovo Team	Ducati	1:30.503
12	88	(Portugal) Miguel Oliveira	Prima Pramac Yamaha MotoGP	Yamaha	1:30.538
13	21	(Italy) Franco Morbidelli	Pertamina Enduro VR46 Racing Team	Ducati	1:30.548
14	41	(Spain) Aleix Espargaró	Honda HRC Test Team	Honda	1:30.578
15	10	(Italy) Luca Marini	Honda HRC Castrol	Honda	1:30.635
16	63	(Italy) Francesco Bagnaia	Ducati Lenovo Team	Ducati	1:30.637
17	1	(Spain) Jorge Martín	Aprilia Racing	Aprilia	1:30.654
18	79	(Japan) Ai Ogura	Trackhouse MotoGP Team	Aprilia	1:30.672
19	7	(Spain) Augusto Fernández	Yamaha Factory Racing	Yamaha	1:30.839
20	33	(South Africa) Brad Binder	Red Bull KTM Factory Racing	KTM	1:30.969
21	5	(France) Johann Zarco	CASTROL Honda LCR	Honda	1:31.150
22	23	(Italy) Enea Bastianini	Red Bull KTM Tech3	KTM	1:31.267
23	35	(Thailand) Somkiat Chantra	Idemitsu Honda LCR	Honda	1:31.441
24	42	(Spain) Álex Rins	Monster Energy Yamaha MotoGP Team	Yamaha	1:31.860
OFFICIAL MOTOGP WARM UP TIMES REPORT

== Race ==
=== MotoGP ===
Pos.	No.	Rider	Team	Manufacturer	Laps	Time/Retired	Grid	Points
1	72	(Italy) Marco Bezzecchi	Aprilia Racing	Aprilia	27	41:52.458	1	25
2	25	(Spain) Raúl Fernández	Trackhouse MotoGP Team	Aprilia	27	+0.686	4	20
3	49	(Italy) Fabio Di Giannantonio	Pertamina Enduro VR46 Racing Team	Ducati	27	+3.765	3	16
4	37	(Spain) Pedro Acosta	Red Bull KTM Factory Racing	KTM	27	+4.749	5	13
5	54	(Spain) Fermín Aldeguer	BK8 Gresini Racing MotoGP	Ducati	27	+8.048	9	11
6	73	(Spain) Álex Márquez	BK8 Gresini Racing MotoGP	Ducati	27	+8.166	2	10
7	10	(Italy) Luca Marini	Honda HRC Castrol	Honda	27	+11.644	13	9
8	33	(South Africa) Brad Binder	Red Bull KTM Factory Racing	KTM	27	+14.582	15	8
9	43	(Australia) Jack Miller	Prima Pramac Yamaha MotoGP	Yamaha	27	+15.497	8	7
10	23	(Italy) Enea Bastianini	Red Bull KTM Tech3	KTM	27	+17.460	20	6
11	88	(Portugal) Miguel Oliveira	Prima Pramac Yamaha MotoGP	Yamaha	27	+19.304	18	5
12	5	(France) Johann Zarco	Castrol Honda LCR	Honda	27	+21.286	11	4
13	36	(Spain) Joan Mir	Honda HRC Castrol	Honda	27	+22.079	10	3
14	42	(Spain) Álex Rins	Monster Energy Yamaha MotoGP Team	Yamaha	27	+23.255	19	2
15	11	(Italy) Nicolò Bulega	Ducati Lenovo Team	Ducati	27	+26.144	22	1
16	7	(Spain) Augusto Fernández	Yamaha Factory Racing	Yamaha	27	+36.854	23	
17	35	(Thailand) Somkiat Chantra	IDEMITSU Honda LCR	Honda	27	+39.136	24	
Ret	41	(Spain) Aleix Espargaró	Honda HRC Test Team	Honda	25	Retired	14	
Ret	20	(France) Fabio Quartararo	Monster Energy Yamaha MotoGP Team	Yamaha	23	Accident	6	
Ret	12	(Spain) Maverick Viñales	Red Bull KTM Tech3	KTM	23	Retired	21	
Ret	1	(Spain) Jorge Martín	Aprilia Racing	Aprilia	15	Retired	17	
Ret	79	(Japan) Ai Ogura	Trackhouse MotoGP Team	Aprilia	6	Collision	12	
Ret	21	(Italy) Franco Morbidelli	Pertamina Enduro VR46 Racing Team	Ducati	1	Retired	7	
Ret	63	(Italy) Francesco Bagnaia	Ducati Lenovo Team	Ducati	0	Accident	16	
Fastest lap: (Spain) Raúl Fernández (Aprilia) – 1:29.976 (lap 4)
OFFICIAL MOTOGP RACE REPORT

=== Moto2 ===
Pos.	No.	Rider	Team	Manufacturer	Laps	Time/Retired	Grid	Points
1	28	(Spain) Izan Guevara	Blu Cru Pramac Yamaha Moto2	Boscoscuro	22	34:19.229	2	25
2	27	(Spain) Daniel Holgado	CFMoto Inde Aspar Team	Kalex	22	+0.717	1	20
3	4	(Spain) Iván Ortolá	QJMotor – Frinsa – MSi	Boscoscuro	22	+2.327	11	16
4	95	(Netherlands) Collin Veijer	Red Bull KTM Ajo	Kalex	22	+2.888	7	13
5	75	(Spain) Albert Arenas	Italjet Gresini Moto2	Kalex	22	+7.867	4	11
6	96	(United Kingdom) Jake Dixon	Elf Marc VDS Racing Team	Boscoscuro	22	+8.595	17	10
7	81	(Australia) Senna Agius	Liqui Moly Dynavolt Intact GP	Kalex	22	+8.944	3	9
8	13	(Italy) Celestino Vietti	Folladore SpeedRS Team	Boscoscuro	22	+11.075	10	8
9	14	(Italy) Tony Arbolino	Blu Cru Pramac Yamaha Moto2	Boscoscuro	22	+11.520	15	7
10	10	(Brazil) Diogo Moreira	Italtrans Racing Team	Kalex	22	+12.019	9	6
11	21	(Spain) Alonso López	Folladore SpeedRS Team	Boscoscuro	22	+14.100	19	5
12	24	(Spain) Marcos Ramírez	OnlyFans American Racing Team	Kalex	22	+15.715	18	4
13	11	(Spain) Álex Escrig	Klint Forward Factory Racing	Forward	22	+15.985	6	3
14	12	(Czech Republic) Filip Salač	Elf Marc VDS Racing Team	Boscoscuro	22	+21.714 (Note: 16-second penalty due to technical regulations infringement.)	13	2
15	44	(Spain) Arón Canet	Fantic Racing Lino Sonego	Kalex	22	+21.975	12	1
16	84	(Netherlands) Zonta van den Goorbergh	RW-Idrofoglia Racing GP	Kalex	22	+22.099	21	
17	64	(Indonesia) Mario Aji	Idemitsu Honda Team Asia	Kalex	22	+22.800	23	
18	80	(Colombia) David Alonso	CFMoto Inde Aspar Team	Kalex	22	+23.925	20	
19	9	(Spain) Jorge Navarro	Klint Forward Factory Team	Forward	22	+31.723	22	
20	92	(Japan) Yuki Kunii	Idemitsu Honda Team Asia	Kalex	22	+31.778	26	
21	85	(Spain) Xabi Zurutuza	OnlyFans American Racing Team	Kalex	22	+33.805	25	
22	18	(Spain) Manuel González	Liqui Moly Dynavolt Intact GP	Kalex	20	+1 lap	5	
23	17	(Spain) Daniel Muñoz	Red Bull KTM Ajo	Kalex	20	+1 lap	8	
Ret	61	(Spain) Eric Fernández	QJMotor – Frinsa – MSi	Boscoscuro	8	Accident	24	
Ret	22	(Spain) Héctor Garzó	RW NTS Idrofolgia	NTS	7	Accident	27	
Ret	3	(Spain) Sergio García	Italjet Gresini Moto2	Kalex	5	Accident	16	
Ret	7	(Belgium) Barry Baltus	Fantic Racing	Kalex	0	Accident	14	
Fastest lap: (Spain) Iván Ortolá (Boscoscuro) - 1:32.773 (lap 2)
OFFICIAL MOTO2 RACE REPORT

=== Moto3 ===
Pos.	No.	Rider	Team	Manufacturer	Laps	Time/Retired	Grid	Points
1	31	(Spain) Adrián Fernández	Leopard Racing	Honda	20	32:48.909	1	25
2	83	(Spain) Álvaro Carpe	Red Bull KTM Ajo	KTM	20	+0.286	6	20
3	72	(Japan) Taiyo Furusato	Honda Team Asia	Honda	20	+0.109 (Note: 1-position penalty for exceeding track limit on the last lap)	9	16
4	94	(Italy) Guido Pini	Liqui Moly Dynavolt Intact GP	KTM	20	+0.397	17	13
5	28	(Spain) Máximo Quiles	CFMoto Valresa Aspar Team	KTM	20	+0.448	3	11
6	36	(Spain) Ángel Piqueras	Frinsa – MT Helmets – MSI	KTM	20	+5.844	10	10
7	58	(Italy) Luca Lunetta	Sic58 Squadra Corse	Honda	20	+5.934	4	9
8	22	(Spain) David Almansa	Leopard Racing	Honda	20	+5.935	2	8
9	45	(Spain) Jesús Ríos	Rivacold Snipers Team	Honda	20	+14.236	16	7
10	73	(Argentina) Valentín Perrone	Red Bull KTM Tech3	KTM	20	+14.382	8	6
11	82	(Italy) Stefano Nepa	Sic58 Squadra Corse	Honda	20	+14.507	7	5
12	95	(Argentina) Marco Morelli	GRYD - Mlav Racing	Honda	20	+15.021 (Note: 3-second penalty for failing to comply with long lap penalty)	5	4
13	67	(Republic of Ireland) Casey O'Gorman	Liqui Moly Dynavolt Intact GP	KTM	20	+17.079	15	3
14	13	(Malaysia) Hakim Danish	Frinsa – MT Helmets – MSI	KTM	20	+17.166	18	2
15	11	(Spain) Adrián Cruces	CIP Green Power	KTM	20	+17.173	11	1
16	12	(Australia) Jacob Roulstone	Red Bull KTM Tech3	KTM	20	+17.382	23	
17	51	(Spain) Brian Uriarte	Red Bull KTM Ajo	KTM	20	+17.522	13	
18	10	(Italy) Nicola Carraro	Rivacold Snipers Team	Honda	20	+32.315	20	
19	18	(Italy) Matteo Bertelle	LEVELUP-MTA	KTM	20	+32.283	21	
20	8	(United Kingdom) Eddie O'Shea	GRYD - Mlav Racing	Honda	20	+32.403	25	
21	71	(Italy) Dennis Foggia	CFMoto Valresa Aspar Team	KTM	20	+32.932	14	
22	21	(South Africa) Ruché Moodley	Denssi Racing – BOE	KTM	20	+32.993	22	
23	66	(Australia) Joel Kelso	LEVELUP-MTA	KTM	20	+35.392	12	
24	14	(New Zealand) Cormac Buchanan	Denssi Racing – BOE	KTM	20	+47.939	26	
Ret	2	(Japan) Zen Mitani	Honda Team Asia	Honda	3	Accident	24	
Ret	19	(United Kingdom) Scott Ogden	CIP Green Power	KTM	0	Accident	19	
Fastest lap: (Spain) Álvaro Carpe (KTM) - 1:37.715 (lap 14)
OFFICIAL MOTO3 RACE REPORT

== Championship standings after the race ==
Below are the standings for the top five riders, constructors, and teams after the round.

=== MotoGP ===
Riders' Championship standings

	Pos.	Rider	Points
	1	(Spain) Marc Márquez	545
	2	(Spain) Álex Márquez	467
	3	(Italy) Marco Bezzecchi	353
1	4	(Spain) Pedro Acosta	307
1	5	(Italy) Francesco Bagnaia	288

Constructors' Championship standings

Pos.	Constructor	Points
1	(Italy) Ducati	768
2	(Italy) Aprilia	418
3	(Austria) KTM	372
4	(Japan) Honda	285
5	(Japan) Yamaha	247

Teams' Championship standings

Pos.	Team	Points
1	(Italy) Ducati Lenovo Team	835
2	(Italy) BK8 Gresini Racing MotoGP	681
3	(Italy) Pertamina Enduro VR46 Racing Team	493
4	(Austria) Red Bull KTM Factory Racing	462
5	(Italy) Aprilia Racing	395

=== Moto2 ===
Riders' Championship standings

Pos.	Rider	Points
1	(Brazil) Diogo Moreira	287
2	(Spain) Manuel González	257
3	(Belgium) Barry Baltus	232
4	(Spain) Arón Canet	227
5	(United Kingdom) Jake Dixon	225

Constructors' Championship standings

Pos.	Constructor	Points
1	(Germany) Kalex	518
2	(Italy) Boscoscuro	342
3	(Switzerland) Forward	28

Teams' Championship standings

Pos.	Team	Points
1	(Italy) Fantic Racing	459
2	(Germany) Liqui Moly Dynavolt Intact GP	406
3	(Spain) CFMoto Inde Aspar Team	361
4	(Italy) Italtrans Racing Team	314
5	(Belgium) Elf Marc VDS Racing Team	310

=== Moto3 ===
Riders' Championship standings

	Pos.	Rider	Points
	1	(Spain) José Antonio Rueda	365
	2	(Spain) Ángel Piqueras	281
	3	(Spain) Máximo Quiles	274
1	4	(Spain) Álvaro Carpe	215
1	5	(Spain) David Muñoz	197

Constructors' Championship standings

Pos.	Constructor	Points
1	(Austria) KTM	540
2	(Japan) Honda	308

Teams' Championship standings

Pos.	Team	Points
1	(Finland) Red Bull KTM Ajo	583
2	(Spain) Frinsa – MT Helmets – MSi	423
3	(Spain) CFMoto Valresa Aspar Team	383
4	(Germany) Liqui Moly Dynavolt Intact GP	329
5	(Luxembourg) Leopard Racing	313

== Notes ==
Previous race: 2025 Portuguese Grand Prix	FIM Grand Prix World Championship; 2025 season	Next race: 2026 Thailand Grand Prix
Previous race: 2023 Valencian Grand Prix	Valencian Community motorcycle Grand Prix	Next race: 2026 Valencian Grand Prix
