= 2027 Moto2 World Championship =

18th running of the Moto2 World Championship

The 2027 FIM Moto2 World Championship will be the intermediate class of the 79th Fédération Internationale de Motocyclisme (FIM) Road Racing World Championship season.

== Teams and riders ==
Team	Constructor	Motorcycle	No.	Rider
(Italy) Blu Cru Pramac Yamaha Moto2	Boscoscuro	B-27	54	(Spain) Alberto Ferrández
(Italy) Blu Cru Pramac Yamaha Moto2	Boscoscuro	B-27	TBA	(Spain) Álvaro Carpe
(Italy) SpeedRS Team	Boscoscuro	B-27	32	(Italy) Luca Lunetta
(Italy) SpeedRS Team	Boscoscuro	B-27	TBA	(Italy) Guido Pini
(Switzerland) Klint Racing Team	Forward	F2	14	(Italy) Tony Arbolino
(Switzerland) Klint Racing Team	Forward	F2	99	(Spain) Adrián Huertas
(Spain) CFMoto Aspar Team	Kalex	Moto2	13	(Italy) Celestino Vietti
(Spain) CFMoto Aspar Team	Kalex	Moto2	TBA	(Spain) Máximo Quiles
(Japan) Honda HRC Asia Idemitsu	Kalex	Moto2	TBA	TBD
(Japan) Honda HRC Asia Idemitsu	Kalex	Moto2	TBA	TBD
(Italy) Italjet Gresini Moto2	Kalex	Moto2	TBA	TBD
(Italy) Italjet Gresini Moto2	Kalex	Moto2	TBA	TBD
(Italy) Italtrans Racing Team	Kalex	Moto2	11	(Spain) Álex Escrig
(Italy) Italtrans Racing Team	Kalex	Moto2	17	(Spain) Daniel Muñoz
(Germany) Liqui Moly Dynavolt Intact GP	Kalex	Moto2	18	(Spain) Manuel González
(Germany) Liqui Moly Dynavolt Intact GP	Kalex	Moto2	TBA	(Spain) David Almansa
(Netherlands) Momoven Idrofoglia RW Racing Team	Kalex	Moto2	53	(Turkey) Deniz Öncü
(Netherlands) Momoven Idrofoglia RW Racing Team	Kalex	Moto2	TBA	TBD
(United States) OnlyFans American Racing Team	Kalex	Moto2	12	(Czech Republic) Filip Salač
(United States) OnlyFans American Racing Team	Kalex	Moto2	16	(United States) Joe Roberts
(Spain) QJMotor – MSi	Kalex	Moto2	4	(Spain) Iván Ortolá
(Spain) QJMotor – MSi	Kalex	Moto2	36	(Spain) Ángel Piqueras
(Finland) Red Bull KTM Ajo	Kalex	Moto2	95	(Netherlands) Collin Veijer
(Finland) Red Bull KTM Ajo	Kalex	Moto2	98	(Spain) José Antonio Rueda
(Italy) Reds Fantic Racing	Kalex	Moto2	7	(Belgium) Barry Baltus
(Italy) Reds Fantic Racing	Kalex	Moto2	44	(Spain) Arón Canet

Key
Regular rider
Replacement rider
Wildcard rider

=== Constructor changes ===
- Marc VDS Racing Team will leave the championship after 17 years.

=== Rider changes ===
- Guido Pini makes his debut in the intermediate class for SpeedRS Team after spending two seasons in Moto3 with Liqui Moly Dynavolt Intact GP and Leopard Racing, replacing Celestino Vietti.
- Klint Racing Team field an all-new line up as Tony Arbolino and Adrián Huertas join the team from Reds Fantic Racing and Italtrans Racing Team, respectively, replacing Xabi Zurutuza and Álex Escrig. Escrig replaces Huertas in Italtrans Racing Team.
- CFMoto Aspar Team field an all-new line up as Daniel Holgado and David Alonso join the MotoGP with BK8 Gresini Racing MotoGP and Pro Honda LCR. Both riders are replaced by Vietti, who moves from SpeedRS Team, and Máximo Quiles, who is promoted to Aspar's Moto2 team after becoming 2026 Moto3 World Champion.
- David Almansa, 2026 Moto3 World Championship runner-up, makes his intermediate class debut with Liqui Moly Dynavolt Intact GP, replacing Senna Agius who joins Red Bull KTM Tech3 in MotoGP.
- Álvaro Carpe makes his intermediate class debut with Blu Cru Pramac Yamaha Moto2, replacing Izan Guevara who steps up to the premier class.
- Arón Canet, left without a seat following Marc VDS Racing's closure, returns to Reds Fantic Racing. The team he previously raced in 2024 and 2025.
- Deniz Öncü, left without a seat following Marc VDS Racing's closure, joins Momoven Idrofoglia RW Racing Team.

== Calendar ==
The following Grands Prix are provisionally scheduled to take place in 2027:

Round	Date	Grand Prix	Circuit	Ref.
1	7 March	Grand Prix of Thailand	Buriram International Circuit, Buriram	
2	14 March	Grand Prix of Qatar	Lusail International Circuit, Lusail	
3	4 April	Grand Prix of Brazil	Autódromo Internacional Ayrton Senna, Goiânia	
4	11 April	Grand Prix of Argentina	Autódromo Oscar y Juan Gálvez, Buenos Aires	
5	25 April	Grand Prix of the United States	Circuit of the Americas, Austin	
6	9 May	Grand Prix of Spain	Circuito de Jerez, Jerez de la Frontera	
7	16 May	Grand Prix of France	Bugatti Circuit, Le Mans	
8	30 May	Grand Prix of Italy	Mugello Circuit, Scarperia e San Piero	
9	13 June	Grand Prix of Catalonia	Circuit de Barcelona-Catalunya, Montmeló	
10	27 June	Grand Prix of the Netherlands	TT Circuit Assen, Assen	
11	11 July	Grand Prix of Germany	Sachsenring, Hohenstein-Ernstthal	
12	18 July	(Czech Republic) Grand Prix of Czechia	Brno Circuit, Brno	
13	15 August	(United Kingdom) Grand Prix of Great Britain	Silverstone Circuit, Silverstone	
14	29 August	Grand Prix of Austria	Red Bull Ring, Spielberg	
15	12 September	Grand Prix of San Marino and the Rimini Riviera	Misano World Circuit, Misano Adriatico	
16	19 September	Grand Prix of Aragon	MotorLand Aragón, Alcañiz	
17	3 October	Grand Prix of Portugal	Algarve International Circuit, Portimão	
18	17 October	Grand Prix of Japan	Motegi Circuit, Motegi	
19	24 October	Grand Prix of Malaysia	Sepang International Circuit, Sepang	
20	31 October	Grand Prix of Indonesia	Mandalika International Street Circuit, Mandalika	
21	14 November	Red Bull Grand Prix of Australia	Adelaide Street Circuit, Adelaide	
22	28 November	(Valencian Community) Grand Prix of Valencia	Circuit Ricardo Tormo, Valencia	

=== Calendar changes ===
- The Hungarian Grand Prix will not be returning to the calendar in 2027.
- The Argentine Grand Prix will return to the calendar after a one-year absence. It will be hosted at Autódromo Oscar y Juan Gálvez having last raced there in 1999, replacing the previous host Autódromo Termas de Río Hondo which has hosted the race since 2014.
- The Australian Grand Prix will move from the Phillip Island Grand Prix Circuit to a modified version of the Adelaide Street Circuit.
