= Jacopo Hosciuc =

Romanian motorcycle racer (born 2005)

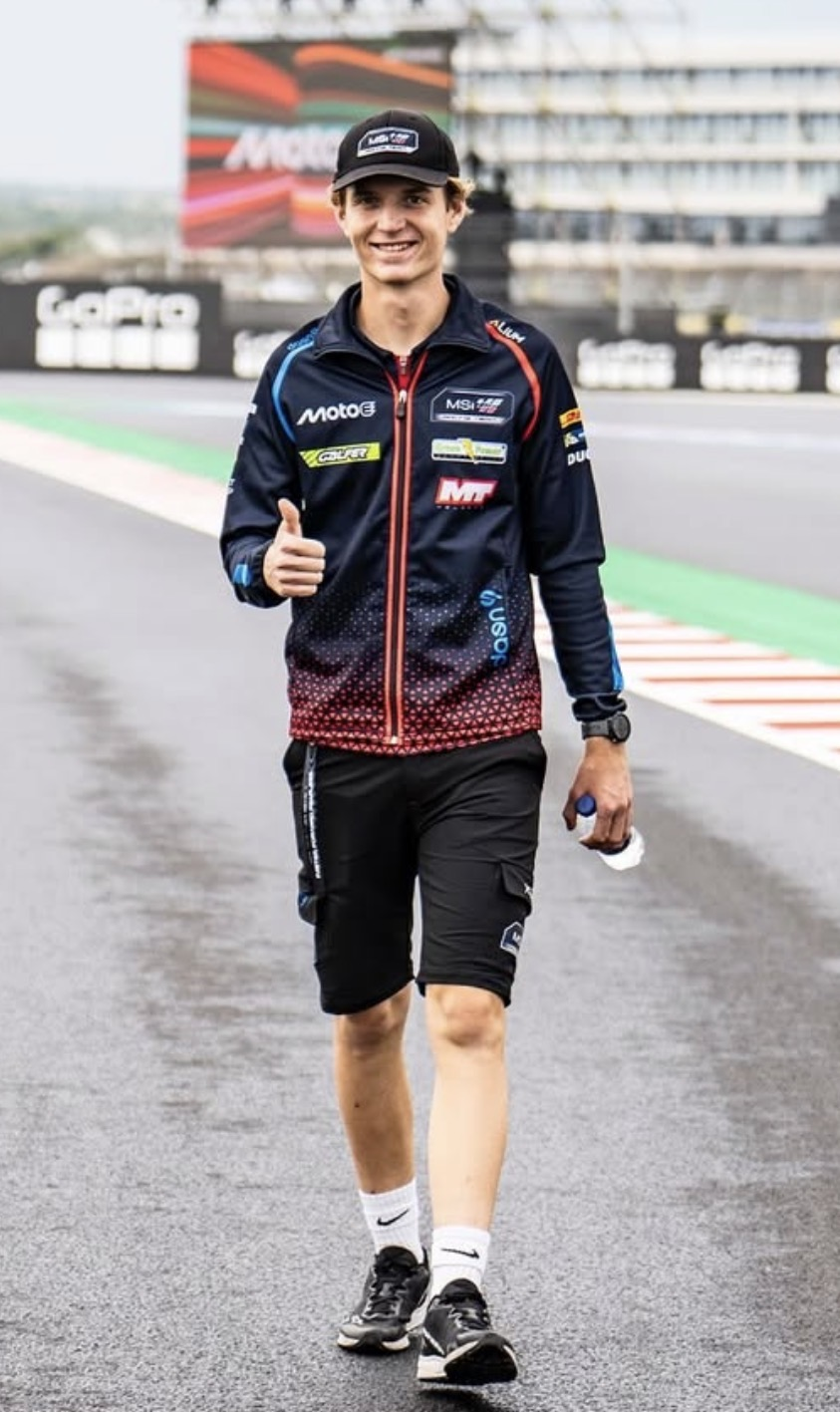
- Hosciuc at the 2025 Hungarian motorcycle Grand Prix
- Nationality: Romanian; Italian
- Born: 12 October 2005 (age 21); Rome, Italy
- Current team: Racing Academy
- Bike number: 6
Motorcycle racing career statistics
MotoE World Championship
Active years	2025
Manufacturers	Ducati (2025)
Championships	0
2025 championship position	12th (84 pts)
Starts / Wins / Podiums / Poles / F. laps / Points; 14 / 0 / 1 / 0 / 1 / 84

Jacopo Adriano Hosciuc (born 12 October 2005) is a Romanian motorcycle racer. He currently races in the Ducati V2 Future Champ Academy.

== Personal life ==
Jacopo Hosciuc was born in Rome, to a family of Romanian immigrants. His mother, Laura, is from Cluj-Napoca, while his father, Adrian, hails from Sighetu Marmației.

== Early career ==
Hosciuc began riding motorcycles at the age of four. Prior to his selection for the Northern Talent Cup, he competed in the Italian CIV Championship, participating in the MiniGP classes and later in PreMoto3. He also raced in the Romanian National Championship where he was the Romanian 50cc National Champion in 2016 and the Romanian 85cc National Champion in 2017. Hosciuc was selected in 2020 to compete in the inaugural season of the Northern Talent Cup. In his first race, he finished second behind the German Freddie Heinrich. During his first season, he finished fifth overall and was selected again to compete in 2021, where he finished sixth, securing a victory at the TT Circuit Assen. He joined the Stock European Championship in 2022 and at the end of the 2023 season, he made his debut in the Moto2 European Championship.

== Career ==
=== MotoE World Championship ===
MSI (2025)

On 15 January 2025, it was announced that Hosciuc would join the MotoE World Championship, signing with MSI. In doing so, he became the second Romanian rider to compete in Motorcycle Grand Prix racing, after Robert Mureșan (2007–2009). Hosciuc made his world championship debut at the 2025 French Grand Prix. His best result of the season came at the 2025 Portuguese Grand Prix, where he finished third. With this result, he became the first Romanian rider to score a podium finish in a Grand Prix event. Aged 20 years and 27 days, he also set a new record as the youngest rider to achieve a MotoE podium, surpassing the previous record held by Mattia Casadei, who was 20 years and 75 days old when he finished on the podium for the first time. He completed the season in 12th place overall with 84 points. At the end of the year, he parted ways with MSI following the announcement that the MotoE World Championship would enter a hiatus.

In 2025, Hosciuc was awarded the title of Master of Sport by the Romanian authorities.

== Career statistics ==
=== European Talent Cup ===
==== Races by year ====
(key) (Races in bold indicate pole position; races in italics indicate fastest lap)

Year	Bike	1	2	3	4	5	6	7	8	9	10	11	Pos	Pts
2019	Honda	EST	EST	VAL	VAL	CAT	ARA	ARA	JER	JER	ALB	VAL; 25	NC	0

=== Northern Talent Cup ===
==== Races by year ====
(key) (Races in bold indicate pole position; races in italics indicate fastest lap)

Year	Bike	1		2		3		4		5		6		7		Pos	Pts
Year	Bike	R1	R2	R1	R2	R1	R2	R1	R2	R1	R2	R1	R2	R1	R2	Pos	Pts
2020	KTM	SAC; 2	SAC; 4	LAU; Ret	LAU; Ret	HOC; 4	HOC; 2	BRN; Ret	BRN; 2							5th	86
2021	KTM	LEM; 13	LEM; 3	OSC; Ret	OSC; 7	SAC; 5	SAC; 3	ASN; 24	ASN; Ret	SPI; Ret	SPI; 20	ASN; 4	ASN; 1	SPI; 18	SPI; 3	6th	109

=== Stock European Championship ===
==== Races by year ====
(key) (Races in bold indicate pole position; races in italics indicate fastest lap)

Year	Bike	1	2	3	4	5	6	7	8	9	10	11	Pos	Pts
2021	**Yamaha**											VAL; Ret	NC	0
2022	**Yamaha**	EST; 9	EST; 7	VAL; 10	CAT; Ret	CAT; 8	JER	ALG; 5	ALG; 10	ARA; 9	ARA; 6	VAL; 10	9th	64
2023	**Yamaha**	EST; WD	VAL	JER; 8	ALG; 9	CAT; Ret	ARA	VAL					15th	15

=== Moto2 European Championship ===
==== Races by year ====
(key) (Races in bold indicate pole position; races in italics indicate fastest lap)

Year	Bike	1	2	3	4	5	6	7	8	9	10	11	Pos	Pts
2023	**Kalex**	EST	EST	VAL	JER	ALG	ALG	CAT	CAT	ARA; 11	ARA; 14	VAL; WD	**22nd**	**7**
2024	**Kalex**	MIS; 14	EST; 16	EST; 15	CAT	CAT	ALG	ALG	JER	ARA	ARA	VAL	**30th**	**3**

=== Grand Prix motorcycle racing ===
==== By season ====
Season	Class	Bike	Team	Race	Win	Podium	Pole	FLap	Pts	Plcd
2025	MotoE	Ducati	MSI	14	0	1	0	1	84	12th
Total				**14**	**0**	**1**	**0**	**1**	**84**	

==== By class ====
Class	Seasons	1st GP	1st Pod	1st Win	Race	Win	Podiums	Pole	FLap	Pts	WChmp
MotoE	2025	2025 France	2025 Portugal		14	0	1	0	1	84	0
Total	2025				**14**	**0**	**1**	**0**	**1**	**84**	**0**

==== Races by year ====
(key) (Races in bold indicate pole position; races in italics indicate fastest lap)

Year	Class	Bike	1	2	3	4	5	6	7	8	9	10	11	12	13	14	Pos	Pts
2025	MotoE	Ducati	FRA1; 11	FRA2; 8	NED1; 10	NED2; 9	AUT1; 12	AUT2; 11	HUN1; Ret	HUN2; 8	CAT1; 11	CAT2; 5	RSM1; 15	RSM2; 8	POR1; 3	POR2; Ret	12th	84
