= Alberto Surra =

Italian motorcycle racer

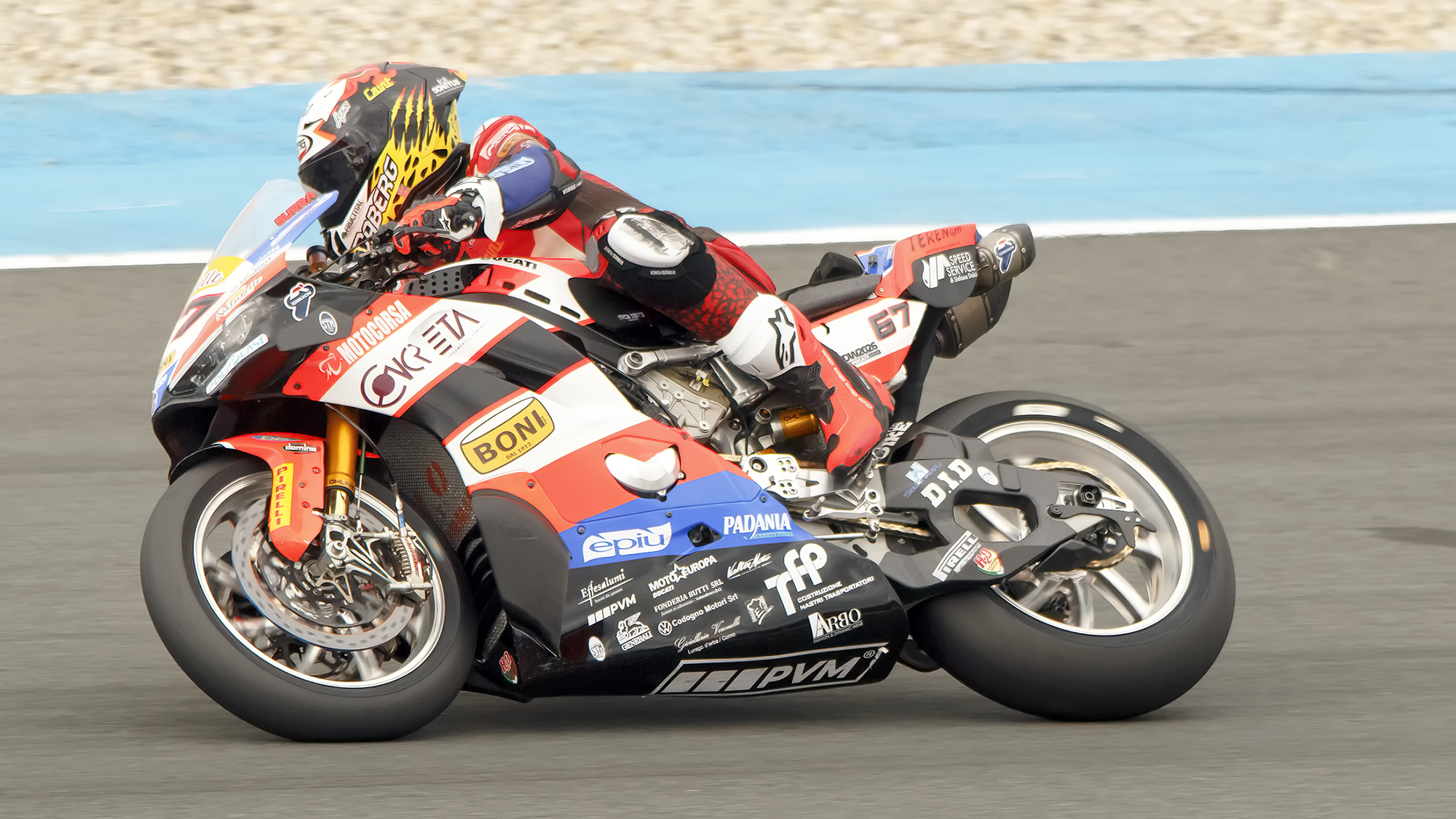
- Surra riding at Assen in 2026
- Nationality: Italian
- Born: 31 May 2004 (age 22); Turin, Italy
- Current team: Motocorsa Racing
- Bike number: 67
Motorcycle racing career statistics
Moto2 World Championship
Active years	2023–2025
Manufacturers	Kalex, Forward, Boscoscuro
Championships	0
2025 championship position	42nd
Starts / Wins / Podiums / Poles / F. laps / Points; 10 / 0 / 0 / 0 / 0 / 0
Moto3 World Championship
Active years	2021–2022
Manufacturers	KTM, Honda
Championships	0
2022 championship position	30th
Starts / Wins / Podiums / Poles / F. laps / Points; 20 / 0 / 0 / 0 / 0 / 1
Superbike World Championship
Active years	2026–
Manufacturers	Ducati
Championships	0
2026 championship position	8th (198 pts)
Starts / Wins / Podiums / Poles / F. laps / Points; 33 / 0 / 4 / 0 / 0 / 198
Supersport World Championship
Active years	2025
Manufacturers	Yamaha
2025 championship position	19th (62 pts)
Starts / Wins / Podiums / Poles / F. laps / Points; 7 / 0 / 1 / 0 / 0 / 62

Alberto Surra (born 31 May 2004) is an Italian motorcycle racer riding for Motocorsa Racing in the 2026 Superbike World Championship.

== Career ==
=== Grand Prix motorcycling career (2021-2025) ===
==== Moto3 World Championship (2021–2022) ====
Surra made his grand prix motorcycle racing debut in the 2021 Moto3 World Championship for Team Bardahl VR46 Riders Academy as a wildcard rider in the Italian motorcycle Grand Prix, where he retired from the race.

Two rounds later, Surra replaced the departing Filip Salač at Rivacold Snipers Team for the rest of the 2021 season, starting at the Dutch TT. He missed both of the next two rounds at Austria due to personal reasons and returned at the British motorcycle Grand Prix. He scored his sole point of his campaign in the penultimate round at the Algarve motorcycle Grand Prix.

Surra continued with Rivacold Snipers Team for the 2022 season, but his season was hampered with injuries and he finished thirtieth in the championship with nil points.

==== Moto2 World Championship (2023-2025) ====
Surra's contract with Rivacold Snipers Team was not renewed and he spent the next three years in the FIM Moto2 European Championship. He made his Moto2 World Championship debut midway through the season in 2023 with Forward Team, replacing Marcos Ramírez. He came a highest of seventeenth three times and was ruled out of the Malaysian Grand Prix due to injury. Surra did not contest the final two rounds of the season due to ending his partnership with the team.

Surra did only one round of the 2024 Moto2 World Championship, serving as a replacement rider in the 2024 Malaysian motorcycle Grand Prix for Fermín Aldeguer with Speed Up Racing. He retired from the race and was not classified in the standings.

Surra did a sole round of the 2025 Moto2 World Championship as a wildcard rider in the 2025 San Marino and Rimini Riviera motorcycle Grand Prix for OnlyFans American Racing Team, where he came 27th in the race.

=== FIM Moto2 European Championship (2023–2025) ===
Surra finished all of his three seasons of the FIM Moto2 European Championship third in the overall standings. In his debut year, he claimed four second places, all in the latter half of the season.

Surra got his first pole position – which he converted to his maiden win – in the series at the opening round of the 2024 FIM Moto2 European Championship. Surra consistently collected podiums throughout the year and ended the championship two points shy to the titles runner-up. Surra also became the 2024 S4 European Champion with VM Racing in the Supermoto European Championship.

In his third year of the Moto2 European Championship, Surra collected only three podiums in his campaign; one in the first round at Estoril and two wins at Magny-Cours and Misano.

=== Supersport World Championship ===
Surra made his Supersport World Championship debut in the final four rounds of the 2025 season as a replacement rider. He scored a podium on debut and pulled consecutive results, ending the championship in 19th.

=== Superbike World Championship ===
Surra moved up to the Superbike World Championship for the 2026 season with Motocorsa Racing.

== Career statistics ==
=== Career highlights ===
- 2024: 1st, Supermoto European Championship

=== Grand Prix motorcycle racing ===
==== By season ====
Season	Class	Motorcycle	Team	Race	Win	Podium	Pole	FLap	Pts	Plcd
2021	Moto3	KTM	Team Bardahl VR46 Riders Academy	1	0	0	0	0	0	32nd
2021	Moto3	Honda	Rivacold Snipers Team	8	0	0	0	0	1	32nd
2022	Moto3									
2022	Moto3	Honda	Rivacold Snipers Team	11	0	0	0	0	0	30th
2023	Moto2	Forward	Forward Team	8	0	0	0	0	0	33rd
2024	Moto2	Boscoscuro	Speed Up Racing	1	0	0	0	0	0	NC
2025	Moto2	Kalex	OnlyFans American Racing Team	1	0	0	0	0	0	42nd
Total				**30**	**0**	**0**	**0**	**0**	**1**	

==== By class ====
Class	Seasons	1st GP	1st Pod	1st Win	Race	Win	Podiums	Pole	FLap	Pts	WChmp
Moto3	2021–2022	2021 Italy			20	0	0	0	0	1	0
Moto2	2023–2025	2023 Austria			10	0	0	0	0	0	0
Total	2021–2025				**30**	**0**	**0**	**0**	**0**	**1**	**0**

==== Races by year ====
(key) (Races in bold indicate pole position, races in italics indicate fastest lap)

Year	Class	Bike	1	2	3	4	5	6	7	8	9	10	11	12	13	14	15	16	17	18	19	20	21	22	Pos	Pts
2021	Moto3	KTM	QAT	DOH	POR	SPA	FRA	ITA; Ret	CAT	GER															32nd	1
2021	Moto3	Honda									NED; 19	STY	AUT	GBR; 20	ARA; 21	RSM; 23	AME; 19	EMI; 16	ALR; 15	VAL; Ret					32nd	1
2022	Moto3	Honda	QAT; Ret	INA; Ret	ARG; 20	AME; DNS	POR	SPA	FRA	ITA; DNS	CAT	GER; 21	NED; 17	GBR; 19	AUT; 27	RSM; 17	ARA; DNS	JPN	THA	AUS; 24	MAL; Ret	VAL; 29			30th	0
2023	Moto2	Forward	POR	ARG	AME	SPA	FRA	ITA	GER	NED	GBR	AUT; 17	CAT; Ret	RSM; 17	IND; 17	JPN; 20	INA; Ret	AUS; 18	THA; Ret	MAL	QAT	VAL			33rd	0
2024	Moto2	Boscoscuro	QAT	POR	AME	SPA	FRA	CAT	ITA	NED	GER	GBR	AUT	CAT	RSM	EMI	INA	JPN	AUS	THA	MAL; Ret	SLD			NC	0
2025	Moto2	Kalex	THA	ARG	AME	QAT	SPA	FRA	GBR	ARA	ITA	NED	GER	CZE	AUT	HUN	CAT	RSM; 27	JPN	INA	AUS	MAL	POR	VAL	42nd	0

=== FIM Moto2 European Championship ===
==== Races by year ====
(key) (Races in bold indicate pole position) (Races in italics indicate fastest lap)

Year	Bike	1	2	3	4	5	6	7	8	9	10	11	Pos	Pts
2023	Boscoscuro	EST1; 4	EST2; 7	VAL; Ret	JER; 7	POR1; 2	POR2; 5	CAT1; 3	CAT2; 2	ARA1; 18	ARA2; 2	VAL; 2	3rd	138
2024	Boscoscuro	**MIS**; 1	EST1; 4	EST2; Ret	CAT1; 4	CAT2; 5	POR1; 2	POR2; 2	JER; Ret	ARA1; 3	ARA2; 3	EST; 2	3rd	154
2025	Kalex	EST1; 3	EST2; 5	JER1; 7	MAG1; 6	MAG2; 1	**ARA1**; 4	**ARA2**; 8	MIS1; 1	CAT1; 7	CAT2; 7	VAL1; 4	3rd	148

=== Supersport World Championship ===
==== Races by year ====
(key) (Races in bold indicate pole position) (Races in italics indicate fastest lap)

Year	Bike	1		2		3		4		5		6		7		8		9		10		11		12		Pos	Pts
Year	Bike	R1	R2	R1	R2	R1	R2	R1	R2	R1	R2	R1	R2	R1	R2	R1	R2	R1	R2	R1	R2	R1	R2	R1	R2	Pos	Pts
2025	Yamaha	AUS	AUS	POR	POR	NED	NED	ITA	ITA	CZE	CZE	EMI	EMI	GBR	GBR	HUN	HUN	FRA; 3	FRA; Ret	ARA; 9	ARA; 9	EST; 6	EST; 5	SPA; 5	SPA; DNS	19th	62

=== Superbike World Championship ===
==== By season ====
Season	Motorcycle	Team	Race	Win	Podium	Pole	FLap	Pts	Plcd
2026	Ducati Panigale V4 R	Motocorsa Racing	33	0	4	0	0	198	8th
Total			**33**	**0**	**4**	**0**	**0**	**198**	

==== Races by year ====
(key) (Races in bold indicate pole position) (Races in italics indicate fastest lap)

Year	Bike	1			2			3			4			5			6			7			8			9			10			11			12			Pos	Pts
Year	Bike	R1	SR	R2	R1	SR	R2	R1	SR	R2	R1	SR	R2	R1	SR	R2	R1	SR	R2	R1	SR	R2	R1	SR	R2	R1	SR	R2	R1	SR	R2	R1	SR	R2	R1	SR	R2	Pos	Pts
2026	Ducati	AUS; 9	AUS; 12	AUS; 12	POR; 15	POR; 15	POR; Ret	NED; 15	NED; 12	NED; 17	HUN; 8	HUN; 6	HUN; 7	CZE; 9	CZE; 5	CZE; 6	ARA; 14	ARA; 4	ARA; 8	EMI; 6	EMI; 7	EMI; 6	GBR; WD	GBR; WD	GBR; WD	FRA; 8	FRA; 4	FRA; 5	ITA; Ret	ITA; 3	ITA; 4	POR; 3	POR; 3	POR; 3	SPA; 6	SPA; 8	SPA; 9	8th	198
