= Borja Gómez (motorcyclist) =

Spanish motorcycle racer (2005–2025)

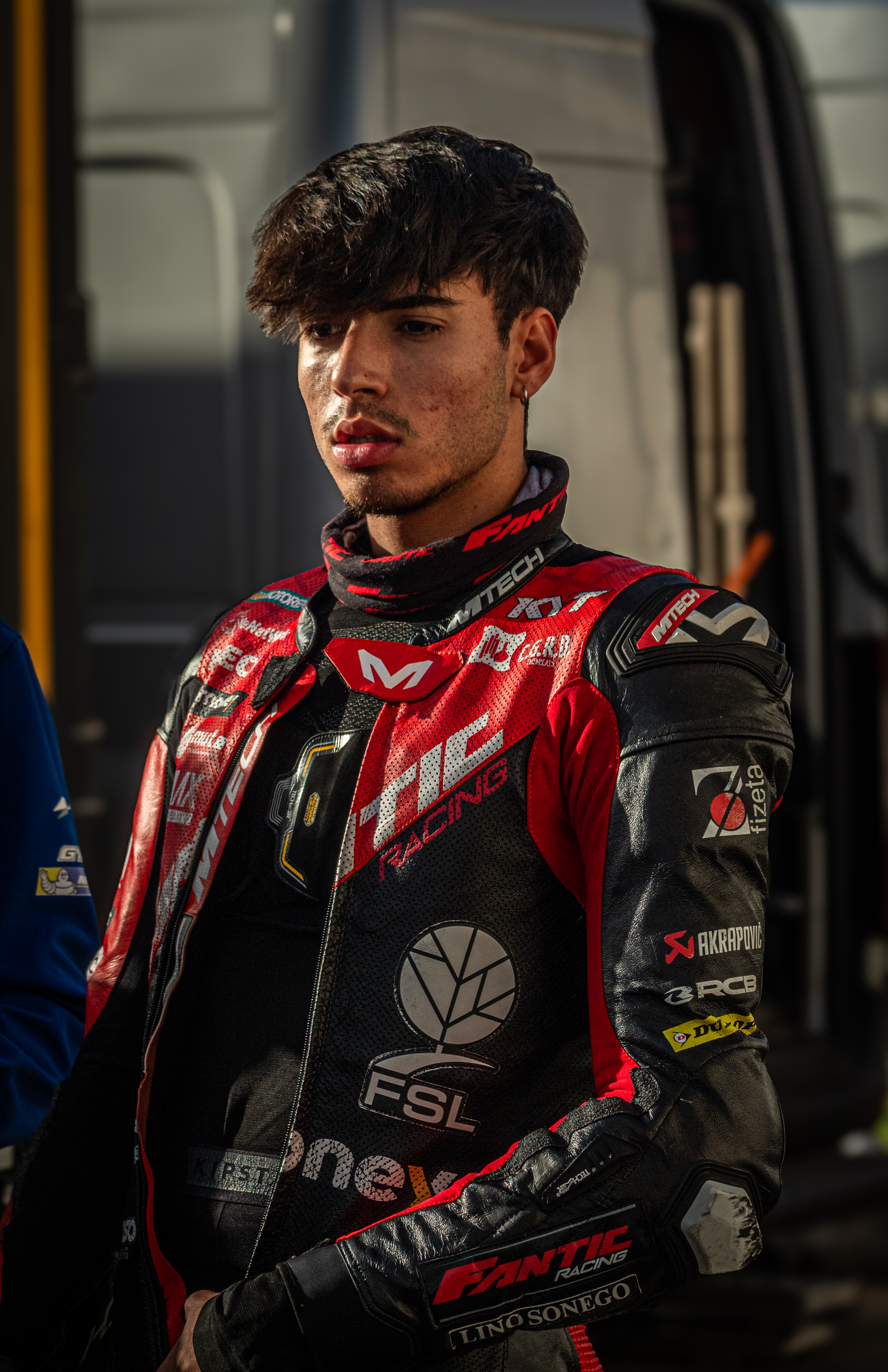
- Gómez in 2024
- Nationality: Spanish
- Born: 10 February 2005; San Javier, Murcia, Spain
- Died: 3 July 2025 (aged 20); Magny-Cours, France
Motorcycle racing career statistics
Moto2 World Championship
| Active years | 2022–2023 |
| Manufacturers | Kalex |
| 2023 championship position | 30th (0 pts) |
Starts / Wins / Podiums / Poles / F. laps / Points; 15 / 0 / 0 / 0 / 0 / 4
Supersport World Championship
| Active years | 2021, 2024 |
| Manufacturers | Yamaha, Kawasaki |
| 2024 championship position | 29th (8 pts) |
Starts / Wins / Podiums / Poles / F. laps / Points; 4 / 0 / 0 / 0 / 0 / 8

Borja Gómez Rus (Spanish: [ˈboɾxa ˈɣomeθ ˈrus]; 10 February 2005 – 3 July 2025) was a Spanish motorcycle racer. He competed in the Supersport World Championship in 2021 and 2024, the Moto2 World Championship between 2022 and 2023, and the FIM Stock European Championship at the time of his death.

== Career ==
Gómez began competing at the national level in 2014, finishing third place in the Spanish Minimotard 65 Championship. In 2015, he climbed a step and reached second place. After going through Supermotard, he reached the Kawasaki Cup in 2019, achieving a creditable third place. In 2021, he won the Spanish Superbike Championship in the Supersport category. In 2022, he was the runner-up in the Spanish Superbike 1000 Championship, driving a Yamaha for Cardoso Team, after Tito Rabat.

=== Moto2 World Championship ===
==== Flexbox HP40 (2022) ====
On 23 October 2022, at the age of 17, Gómez made his debut in the Moto2 World Championship with the Flexbox HP40, replacing Jorge Navarro at the Sepang Circuit in Malaysia. At the 2022 Valencian Community motorcycle Grand Prix in Cheste, he finished in 12th place, earning him his first four points in the world championship.

==== Fantic Racing (2023) ====
For the 2023 season, Gómez signed with Fantic Racing.

== Death ==
Gómez was competing in the 2025 FIM Stock European Championship when he died following an accident during practice at Circuit de Nevers Magny-Cours. During his third lap in the Thursday session, Borja Gómez's machine slid on the approach to turn 9, and left the track after hitting a patch of coolant leaked on the asphalt by the motorcycle of his teammate Alberto Garcia. Unaware of the danger, Gómez tried to lift his bike to resume testing, with his back to the track, just when another rider, Joan Santos fell down after hitting the same patch of coolant. Santos was thrown from his saddle and without a drive, his machine struck Borja Gómez, inflicting him unsurvivable fractures and injuries.

A few seconds later, a third rider, Filippo Fuligni slid and crashed at the same place, without consequences. The Italian rider was the first to reach Borja Gómez lying on the run-off area, trying to help him before the arrival of the ambulance men.

== Career statistics ==
=== FIM Moto2 European Championship ===
==== By year ====
(key) (Races in bold indicate pole position, races in italics indicate fastest lap)

| Year | Bike | 1 | 2 | 3 | 4 | 5 | 6 | 7 | 8 | 9 | 10 | 11 | Pos | Pts |
|---|---|---|---|---|---|---|---|---|---|---|---|---|---|---|
| 2022 | Kalex | EST | EST | VAL | CAT | CAT | JER | POR | POR | ARA | ARA | VAL; 7 | 25th | 9 |
| 2023 | Kalex | EST1 | EST2 | VAL1 | JER | POR1 | POR2 | CAT1 | CAT2 | ARA1; 3 | ARA2; 3 | VAL2; DNS | 17th | 32 |
| 2024 | Kalex | MIS; WD | EST1 | EST2 | CAT1 | CAT2 | POR1 | POR2 | JER | ARA1 | ARA2 | EST | NC | 0 |

=== FIM Stock European Championship ===
==== Races by year ====
(key) (Races in bold indicate pole position, races in italics indicate fastest lap)

| Year | Bike | Team | 1 | 2 | 3 | 4 | 5 | 6 | 7 | Pos | Pts |
|---|---|---|---|---|---|---|---|---|---|---|---|
| 2025 | Honda | Team Honda Laglisse | EST; 2 | JER; 1 | MAG; DNS | ARA | MIS | CAT | VAL | 9th | 45 |

* Season still in progress.

=== Grand Prix motorcycle racing ===
==== By season ====
| Season | Class | Motorcycle | Team | Race | Win | Podium | Pole | FLap | Pts | Plcd |
|---|---|---|---|---|---|---|---|---|---|---|
| 2022 | Moto2 | Kalex | Flexbox HP40 | 2 | 0 | 0 | 0 | 0 | 4 | 31st |
| 2023 | Moto2 | Kalex | Fantic Motor | 13 | 0 | 0 | 0 | 0 | 0 | 30th |
| Total | | | | **15** | **0** | **0** | **0** | **0** | **4** | |

==== By class ====
| Class | Seasons | 1st GP | Race | Win | Podiums | Pole | FLap | Pts | WChmp |
|---|---|---|---|---|---|---|---|---|---|
| Moto2 | 2022–2023 | 2022 Malaysia | 15 | 0 | 0 | 0 | 0 | 4 | 0 |
| Total | 2022–2023 | | **15** | **0** | **0** | **0** | **0** | **4** | **0** |

==== Races by year ====
(key) (Races in bold indicate pole position; races in italics indicate fastest lap)

| Year | Class | Bike | 1 | 2 | 3 | 4 | 5 | 6 | 7 | 8 | 9 | 10 | 11 | 12 | 13 | 14 | 15 | 16 | 17 | 18 | 19 | 20 | Pos | Pts |
|---|---|---|---|---|---|---|---|---|---|---|---|---|---|---|---|---|---|---|---|---|---|---|---|---|
| 2022 | Moto2 | Kalex | QAT | INA | ARG | AME | POR | SPA | FRA | ITA | CAT | GER | NED | GBR | AUT | RSM | ARA | JPN | THA | AUS | MAL; 20 | VAL; 12 | 31st | 4 |
| 2023 | Moto2 | Kalex | POR; 17 | ARG; 21 | AME; 20 | SPA; 19 | FRA; 23 | ITA; 17 | GER; DNS | NED; Ret | GBR; Ret | AUT; 16 | CAT; 20 | RSM; 18 | IND; 16 | JPN; 24 | INA | AUS | THA | MAL | QAT | VAL | 30th | 0 |

=== Supersport World Championship ===
==== Races by year ====
(key) (Races in bold indicate pole position, races in italics indicate fastest lap)

| Year | Bike | 1 | | 2 | | 3 | | 4 | | 5 | | 6 | | 7 | | 8 | | 9 | | 10 | | 11 | | 12 | | Pos | Pts |
| Year | Bike | R1 | R2 | R1 | R2 | R1 | R2 | R1 | R2 | R1 | R2 | R1 | R2 | R1 | R2 | R1 | R2 | R1 | R2 | R1 | R2 | R1 | R2 | R1 | R2 | Pos | Pts |
|---|---|---|---|---|---|---|---|---|---|---|---|---|---|---|---|---|---|---|---|---|---|---|---|---|---|---|---|
| 2021 | Yamaha | SPA | SPA | POR | POR | ITA | ITA | NED | NED | CZE | CZE | SPA; 16 | SPA; Ret | FRA | FRA | SPA | SPA | SPA | SPA | POR | POR | ARG | ARG | INA | INA | NC | 0 |
| 2024 | Kawasaki | AUS | AUS | SPA | SPA | NED | NED | ITA | ITA | GBR | GBR | CZE | CZE | POR | POR | FRA | FRA | ITA; 12 | ITA; 22 | SPA; 17 | SPA; 12 | POR | POR | SPA | SPA | 29th | 8 |
