= Alberto Ferrández =

Spanish motorcycle racer (born 2007)

- Ferrández at the 2026 Czech Grand Prix
- Nationality: Spanish
- Born: 2 September 2007 (age 19); Cox, Spain
- Current team: Blu Cru Pramac Yamaha Moto2 Team
- Bike number: 54
Motorcycle racing career statistics
Moto2 World Championship
Active years	2025–
Manufacturers	Boscoscuro
2025 championship position	36th (0 pts)
Starts / Wins / Podiums / Poles / F. laps / Points; 18 / 0 / 0 / 0 / 0 / 17.5

Alberto Ferrández Beneite (born 2 September 2007) is a Spanish Grand Prix motorcycle racer who competes for the Blu Cru Pramac Yamaha Moto2 Team in the 2026 Moto2 World Championship.

== Career ==
=== Early career ===
In 2015, Ferrández won the Copa De España De Minivelocidad Minimoto, in 2016, he won the Copa De España De Minivelocidad PromoGP 140, and in 2017, he won the Spanish Moto5 Championship.

=== Moto2 World Championship ===
==== Speed Up (2025) ====
Ferrández made his Moto2 World Championship debut at the San Marino and Rimini Riviera motorcycle Grand Prix with Beta Tools-Boscoscoscuro as a wildcard entry.

==== Pramac Yamaha Moto2 (2026–) ====
Ferrández made his full-time debut in Moto2 in 2026 with Blu Cru Pramac Yamaha Moto2 Team, partnering 2022 Moto3 champion Izan Guevara.

Ferrández was retained by Pramac for 2027; Alvaro Carpe will be his new teammate, who replaces MotoGP-bound Guevara.

== Career statistics ==
=== FIM Moto2 European Championship ===
==== Races by year ====
(key) (Races in bold indicate pole position, races in italics indicate fastest lap)

Year	Bike	1	2	3	4	5	6	7	8	9	10	11	Pos	Pts
2023	Boscoscuro	EST1	EST2	VAL1	JER	POR1	POR2	CAT1	CAT2	ARA1; 5	ARA2; 4	VAL2; 9	19th	31
2024	Boscoscuro	MIS; 3	EST1; 7	EST2; 3	CAT1; Ret	CAT2; 8	POR1; 3	POR2; 4	JER; 2	**ARA1**; 1	**ARA2**; 7	**EST**; Ret	4th	132
2025	Boscoscuro	EST1; Ret	EST2; 1	JER; 5	MAG1; 1	MAG2; 4	ARA1; 1	ARA2; 5	MIS; Ret	CAT1; 3	CAT2; 3	VAL; Ret	4th	142

=== Grand Prix motorcycle racing ===
==== By season ====
Season	Class	Motorcycle	Team	Race	Win	Podium	Pole	FLap	Pts	Plcd
2025	Moto2	Boscoscuro	Beta Tools – Boscoscuro	1	0	0	0	0	0	36th
2026	Moto2	Boscoscuro	Blu Cru Pramac Yamaha Moto2	16	0	0	0	0	17.5*	22nd*
Total				**17**	**0**	**0**	**0**	**0**	**17.5**	

==== By class ====
Class	Seasons	1st GP	1st pod	1st win	Race	Win	Podiums	Pole	FLap	Pts	WChmp
Moto2	2025–present	2025 San Marino			17	0	0	0	0	17.5	0
Total	2025–present				**17**	**0**	**0**	**0**	**0**	**17.5**	

==== Races by year ====
(key) (Races in bold indicate pole position; races in italics indicate fastest lap)

Year	Class	Bike	1	2	3	4	5	6	7	8	9	10	11	12	13	14	15	16	17	18	19	20	21	22	Pos	Pts
2025	Moto2	Boscoscuro	THA	ARG	AME	QAT	SPA	FRA	GBR	ARA	ITA	NED	GER	CZE	AUT	HUN	CAT	RSM; 22	JPN	INA	AUS	MAL	POR	VAL	36th	0
2026	Moto2	Boscoscuro	THA; 15^{‡}	BRA; 17	USA; DNS	SPA; 21	FRA; 15	CAT; 18	ITA; 19	HUN; 9	CZE; 22	NED; 10	GER; 22	GBR; 15	ARA; 21	RSM; 14	AUT; DNS	JPN	INA; Ret	AUS; C	MAL; 20	QAT; 19	POR	VAL	22nd*	17.5*

^{‡} Half points awarded as less than half of the race distance (but at least three full laps) was completed.
* Season still in progress.
