= Senna Agius =

Australian motorcycle racer

- Nationality: Australian
- Born: 9 June 2005 (age 21); Camden, New South Wales, Australia
- Current team: Liqui Moly Husqvarna Intact GP
- Bike number: 81
Motorcycle racing career statistics
Moto2 World Championship
Active years	2022–
Manufacturers	Kalex
2025 championship position	10th (149 pts)
Starts / Wins / Podiums / Poles / F. laps / Points; 69 / 4 / 9 / 2 / 2 / 398

Senna Agius (born 9 June 2005) is an Australian Grand Prix motorcycle racer, competing in Moto2 with LIQUI MOLY Dynavolt Intact GP. He won the 2023 FIM Moto2 European Championship and made his full-time Moto2 debut in 2024. In 2025, he claimed his maiden Grand Prix victory at Silverstone and later became the first Australian rider to win a Moto2 race on home soil at Phillip Island.

Agius dominated the 2023 FIM Moto2 European Championship, becoming the first Australian champion in the class, after finishing runner-up in 2022. He stepped up to the Moto2 World Championship full-time in 2024 with the Intact GP team and scored a maiden world championship podium at Phillip Island that season.

Agius will move into the premier class, MotoGP, for the 2027 MotoGP World Championship, and will ride for the Tech3 team.

== Personal life ==
Agius was born and raised in south-west Sydney and is from Camden, New South Wales. During his early European campaigns, he was based in Andorra while racing in JuniorGP and the European Moto2 Championship. He has stated that his father played a formative role in his racing path. Agius’ surname is Maltese in origin. Senna Agius’ parents named him after Brazilian F1 legend Ayrton Senna.

== Career ==
=== MotoGP World Championship (2027–) ===
==== Red Bull KTM Tech3 (2027–) ====
Agius will be promoted to MotoGP for 2027, joining Luca Marini at Red Bull KTM Tech3 on a multi-year deal.

== Career statistics ==
=== FIM CEV Moto3 Junior World Championship ===
==== Races by year ====
(key) (Races in bold indicate pole position, races in italics indicate fastest lap)

Year	Bike	1	2	3	4	5	6	7	8	9	10	11	12	Pos	Pts
2020	Honda	EST; 20	POR; 16	JER1; 17	JER2; 17	JER3; 18	ARA1; 13	ARA2; Ret	ARA3; Ret	VAL1; 18	VAL2; 21	VAL3; 16		29th	3
2021	Honda	EST; 26	VAL1; Ret	VAL2; 17	CAT1; Ret	CAT2; 15	POR; 19	ARA; 18	JER1; 19	JER2; Ret	RSM; 23	VAL3; 14	VAL4; 16	35th	3

=== FIM Moto2 European Championship ===
==== Races by year ====
(key) (Races in bold indicate pole position) (Races in italics indicate fastest lap)

Year	Bike	1	2	3	4	5	6	7	8	9	10	11	Pos	Pts
2022	Kalex	EST; 2	EST; 2	VAL; Ret	CAT; 1	CAT; 1	JER; 3	POR; Ret	POR; 2	ARA; 2	ARA; 2	**VAL**; 3	2nd	182
2023	Kalex	**EST1**; 1	**EST2**; 1	**VAL**; 1	JER; 3	**POR1**; 1	**POR2**; 1	CAT1	CAT2	**ARA1**; 1	**ARA2**; 1	**VAL**; 1	1st	216

=== Grand Prix motorcycle racing ===
==== By season ====
Season	Class	Motorcycle	Team	Race	Win	Podium	Pole	FLap	Pts	Plcd
2022	Moto2	Kalex	Elf Marc VDS Racing Team	4	0	0	0	0	7	26th
2023	Moto2	Kalex	Liqui Moly Husqvarna Intact GP	5	0	0	0	0	0	36th
2024	Moto2	Kalex	Liqui Moly Husqvarna Intact GP	20	0	1	0	0	67	18th
2025	Moto2	Kalex	Liqui Moly Dynavolt Intact GP	21	2	4	0	0	149	10th
2026	Moto2	Kalex	Liqui Moly Dynavolt Intact GP	19	2	4	2	2	175*	6th*
Total				**69**	**4**	**9**	**2**	**2**	**398**	

==== By class ====
Class	Seasons	1st GP	1st pod	1st win	Race	Win	Podiums	Pole	FLap	Pts	WChmp
Moto2	2022–present	2022 Austria	2024 Australia	2025 Great Britain	69	4	9	2	2	398	0
Total	2022–present				**69**	**4**	**9**	**2**	**2**	**398**	**0**

==== Races by year ====
(key) (Races in bold indicate pole position; races in italics indicate fastest lap)

Year	Class	Bike	1	2	3	4	5	6	7	8	9	10	11	12	13	14	15	16	17	18	19	20	21	22	Pos	Pts
2022	Moto2	Kalex	QAT	INA	ARG	AME	POR	SPA	FRA	ITA	CAT	GER	NED	GBR	AUT; 17	RSM; Ret	ARA; 16	JPN	THA	AUS	MAL	VAL; 9			26th	7
2023	Moto2	Kalex	POR	ARG	AME; 21	SPA; 19	FRA	ITA	GER	NED	GBR	AUT	CAT; Ret	RSM; Ret	IND	JPN; 21	INA	AUS	THA	MAL	QAT	VAL			36th	0
2024	Moto2	Kalex	QAT; 17	POR; 14	AME; 17	SPA; Ret	FRA; 13	CAT; 5	ITA; 17	NED; 11	GER; 11	GBR; 10	AUT; 15	ARA; 16	RSM; 11	EMI; 7	INA; Ret	JPN; 20	AUS; 3	THA; Ret	MAL; Ret	SLD; 12			18th	67
2025	Moto2	Kalex	THA; 3	ARG; 13	AME; 23	QAT; 14	SPA; 3	FRA; 14	GBR; 1	ARA; 4	ITA; 13	NED; 9	GER; 11	CZE; 15	AUT; Ret	HUN	CAT; 18	RSM; 5	JPN; Ret	INA; 12	AUS; 1	MAL; Ret	POR; 9	VAL; 7	10th	149
2026	Moto2	Kalex	**THA**; 18	BRA; 19	USA; 1	SPA; 1	FRA; 7	CAT; 10	ITA; 4	HUN; 3	CZE; 4	NED; 3	GER; 4	GBR; 20	ARA; 4	**RSM**; Ret	AUT; Ret	JPN; 13	INA; 4	AUS; C	MAL; 15	QAT; 7	POR	VAL	6th*	175*

* Season still in progress.

=== Australian Superbike Championship ===
==== Races by year ====
(key) (Races in bold indicate pole position; races in italics indicate fastest lap)

Year	Bike	1		2		3		4			5		6			7		Pos	Pts
Year	Bike	R1	R2	R1	R2	R1	R2	R1	R2	R3	R1	R2	R1	R2	R3	R1	R2	Pos	Pts
2022	Honda	PHI	PHI	QUE	QUE	WAK	WAK	HID	HID	HID	MOR	MOR	PHI; 6	PHI; 8	PHI; Ret	BEN; Ret	BEN; 2	18th	48
