= 2024 FIM Moto2 European Championship =

Edition of a motorsport season

2024 FIM Moto2 European Championship
Previous:	2023	Next:	2025
Support series: 2024 FIM Stock European Championship; JuniorGP World Championship; European Talent Cup

The 2024 FIM Moto2 European Championship was the third season after leaving the historical connection to CEV and the ninth under the FIM banner. The season started on 21 April at Misano World Circuit Marco Simoncelli in Italy and finished on 27 November at Circuito do Estoril in Portugal.

Roberto García was crowned champion during the final round, taking four wins during the season.

== Calendar ==
The calendar was published in November 2023. The season finale was originally scheduled to take place at Circuit Ricardo Tormo, but due to the 2024 Spanish floods it was moved to Circuito do Estoril.

round	Date	Circuit	Pole position	Fastest lap	Race winner	Winning constructor
1	21 April	(Italy) Misano	(Italy) Alberto Surra	(Spain) Roberto Garcia	(Italy) Alberto Surra	(Italy) Boscoscuro
2	5 May	(Portugal) Estoril	(Italy) Mattia Casadei	(Spain) Jorge Navarro	(Italy) Mattia Casadei	(Italy) Boscoscuro
2	5 May	(Portugal) Estoril	(Italy) Mattia Casadei	(Spain) Roberto García	(Spain) Roberto García	(Germany) Kalex
3	19 May	(Spain) Catalunya	(Spain) Jorge Navarro	(Spain) Roberto García	(Spain) Daniel Muñoz	(Germany) Kalex
3	19 May	(Spain) Catalunya	(Spain) Jorge Navarro	(Spain) Eric Fernández	(Spain) Daniel Muñoz	(Germany) Kalex
4	23 June	(Portugal) Portimão	(Spain) Roberto García	(Italy) Alberto Surra	(Spain) Roberto García	(Germany) Kalex
4	23 June	(Portugal) Portimão	(Spain) Roberto García	(Spain) Roberto García	(Spain) Roberto García	(Germany) Kalex
5	15 September	(Spain) Jerez	(Spain) Roberto García	(Spain) Roberto García	(Spain) Daniel Muñoz	(Germany) Kalex
6	13 October	(Spain) Aragón	(Spain) Alberto Ferrández	(Spain) Roberto García	(Spain) Alberto Ferrández	(Italy) Boscoscuro
6	13 October	(Spain) Aragón	(Spain) Alberto Ferrández	(Spain) Roberto García	(Spain) Roberto García	(Germany) Kalex
7	27 November	(Portugal) Estoril	(Spain) Alberto Ferrández	(Spain) Unai Orradre	(Spain) Unai Orradre	(Germany) Kalex

== Entry list ==
Team	Constructor	No.	Rider	Rounds
(Spain) EasyRace Team	(Italy) Boscoscuro	22	(South Africa) Brett Roberts	1, 3–5
(Spain) EasyRace Team	(Italy) Boscoscuro	38	(Norway) Ola Nesbakken	6–7
(Spain) EasyRace Team	(Italy) Boscoscuro	75	(Portugal) Ivo Lopes	2
(Spain) Finetwork Team	(Italy) Boscoscuro	54	(Spain) Alberto Ferrández	All
(Italy) Team Ciatti - Boscoscuro	(Italy) Boscoscuro	19	(Italy) Mattia Pasini	1, 3
(Italy) Team Ciatti - Boscoscuro	(Italy) Boscoscuro	40	(Italy) Mattia Casadei	All
(Italy) Team Ciatti - Boscoscuro	(Italy) Boscoscuro	67	(Italy) Alberto Surra	All
(Spain) EEST 84R	(Switzerland) Forward	11	(Spain) Álex Escrig	1
(Spain) EEST 84R	(Switzerland) Forward	98	(Thailand) Chanon Inta	2
(Switzerland) Klint Forward Junior Team	(Switzerland) Forward	11	(Spain) Jorge Navarro	2–4
(Spain) AGR Team	(Germany) Kalex	14	(Spain) Álex Millán	7
(Spain) AGR Team	(Germany) Kalex	24	(Italy) Nicholas Spinelli	5–6
(Spain) AGR Team	(Germany) Kalex	27	(United States) Maxwell Toth	1–4, 6–7
(Spain) AGR Team	(Germany) Kalex	28	(India) Geoffrey Emmanuel	5
(Spain) EEST 84R	(Germany) Kalex	98	(Thailand) Chanon Inta	3, 5–7
(Germany) F. Koch Motorsport	(Germany) Kalex	18	(Germany) Jona Eisenkolb	All
(Spain) Fantic Cardoso Racing	(Germany) Kalex	31	(Spain) Roberto García	All
(Spain) Fantic Cardoso Racing	(Germany) Kalex	49	(Italy) Francesco Mongiardo	All
(Spain) Fantic Cardoso Racing	(Germany) Kalex	70	(United Kingdom) Joshua Whatley	5–7
(Spain) Fau55 Tey Racing	(Germany) Kalex	4	(Spain) Eric Fernández	All
(Spain) Fau55 Tey Racing	(Germany) Kalex	13	(Italy) Mattia Rato	1–4
(Spain) Fau55 Tey Racing	(Germany) Kalex	30	(Italy) Gianpaolo Di Vittori	All
(Spain) Fau55 Tey Racing	(Germany) Kalex	88	(Qatar) Abdulla Al Qubaisi	5–7
(Spain) Fifty Motorsport	(Germany) Kalex	71	(Morocco) Anas Sorhmat	5
(Spain) Preicanos Racing Team	(Germany) Kalex	17	(Spain) Daniel Muñoz	1–5
(Spain) Preicanos Racing Team	(Germany) Kalex	23	(Japan) Taiga Hada	All
(Spain) Preicanos Racing Team	(Germany) Kalex	43	(Spain) Xavier Artigas	7
(Spain) Preicanos Racing Team	(Germany) Kalex	44	(China) Jinlin Li	2–7
(France) JEG Racing	(Germany) Kalex	9	(France) Charles Aubrie	All
(Spain) MDR COMPETICIÓN	(Germany) Kalex	32	(Japan) Yosuke Hosaka	6–7
(Italy) Team MMR	(Germany) Kalex	6	(Romania) Jacopo Hosciuc	1–3
(Italy) Team MMR	(Germany) Kalex	77	(Italy) Mattia Volpi	All
(Italy) Team MMR	(Germany) Kalex	92	(United States) Rossi Moor	6–7
(Spain) Promoracing	(Germany) Kalex	2	(Italy) Lorenzo Sommariva	7
(Spain) Promoracing	(Germany) Kalex	7	(France) Johan Gimbert	All
(Spain) Promoracing	(Germany) Kalex	16	(Japan) Kaito Toba	2–5
(Spain) PS Racing	(Germany) Kalex	21	(Spain) Eduardo Montero	1–3
(Spain) PS Racing	(Germany) Kalex	73	(Italy) Jacopo Cretaro	4–5
(Spain) SF Racing	(Germany) Kalex	5	(France) Lorenzo Fellon	1–6
(Spain) STV Laglisse Racing	(Germany) Kalex	10	(Spain) Unai Orradre	All
(Spain) STV Laglisse Racing	(Germany) Kalex	12	(Spain) Borja Gómez	1
(Spain) STV Laglisse Racing	(Germany) Kalex	21	(Spain) Eduardo Montero	6–7
Yamaha Stylobike Philippines	(Germany) Kalex	8	(Spain) Marco Tapia	3–5, 7
Yamaha Stylobike Philippines	(Germany) Kalex	29	(Australia) Harrison Voight	All

== Championship standings ==
Scoring system

Points were awarded to the top fifteen finishers. Rider had to finish the race to earn points.

Position	1st	2nd	3rd	4th	5th	6th	7th	8th	9th	10th	11th	12th	13th	14th	15th
Points	25	20	16	13	11	10	9	8	7	6	5	4	3	2	1

=== Riders championship ===
Pos.	Rider	Bike	MIS (Italy)	EST1 (Portugal)		CAT (Spain)		POR (Portugal)		JER (Spain)	ARA (Spain)		EST2 (Portugal)	Points
1	(Spain) Roberto García	Kalex	2^{F}	6	1^{F}	3^{F}	NC	1^{P}	1^{PF}	Ret^{PF}	4^{F}	1^{F}	5	170
2	(Italy) Mattia Casadei	Boscoscuro	4	1^{P}	2^{P}	5	4	6	5	3	5	6	3	156
3	(Italy) Alberto Surra	Boscoscuro	1^{P}	4	Ret	4	5	2^{F}	2	Ret	3	3	2	154
4	(Spain) Alberto Ferrández	Boscoscuro	3	7	3	Ret	8	3	4	2	1^{P}	7^{P}	Ret^{P}	132
5	(Spain) Unai Orradre	Kalex	6	10	Ret	8	3	5	3	Ret	6	2	1^{F}	122
6	(Spain) Daniel Muñoz	Kalex	7	9	Ret	1	1	4	Ret	1				104
7	(Spain) Jorge Navarro	Forward		2^{F}	8	2^{P}	2^{P}	9	7					84
8	(Spain) Eric Fernández	Kalex	8	8	5	Ret	6^{F}	7	12	9	2	Ret	Ret	77
9	(Japan) Taiga Hada	Kalex	9	3	4	6	7	12	15	5	Ret	12	WD	75
10	(France) Johan Gimbert	Kalex	13	11	9	9	10	10	9	4	12	10	11	69
11	(Australia) Harrison Voight	Kalex	10	Ret	7	Ret	Ret	Ret	8	6	7	8	6	60
12	(Italy) Francesco Mongiardo	Kalex	5	12	6	7	Ret	Ret	Ret	13	13	11	7	54
13	(Spain) Marco Tapia	Kalex				10	11	Ret	10	7			8	34
14	(France) Lorenzo Fellon	Kalex	11	14	11	12	12	Ret	13	10	15	13		33
15	(Italy) Mattia Volpi	Kalex	Ret	15	12	Ret	13	Ret	11	Ret	11	4	Ret	31
16	(Italy) Mattia Rato	Kalex	Ret	5	13	11	9	Ret	14					28
17	(Japan) Kaito Toba	Kalex		13	Ret	Ret	Ret	8	6	WD				21
18	(Italy) Nicholas Spinelli	Kalex								WD	8	5		19
19	(United Kingdom) Joshua Whatley	Kalex								Ret	10	9	12	17
20	(United States) Rossi Moor	Kalex									9	Ret	9	14
21	(Spain) Xavier Artigas	Kalex											4	13
22	(South Africa) Brett Roberts	Boscoscuro	12			13	Ret	11	Ret	DNS				12
23	(United States) Maxwell Toth	Kalex	DNQ	WD	WD	14	15	Ret	DNS		16	14	10	11
24	(Italy) Gianpaolo Di Vittori	Kalex	Ret	Ret	16	Ret	16	13	16	11	17	17	15	9
25	(Italy) Jacopo Cretaro	Kalex						DNS	DNS	8				8
26	(Qatar) Abdulla Al Qubaisi	Kalex								12	18	16	13	7
27	(Spain) Eduardo Montero	Kalex	Ret	17	14	Ret	14				14	15	WD	7
28	(Portugal) Ivo Lopes	Boscoscuro		Ret	10									6
29	(Thailand) Chanon Inta	Forward		18	17									5
29	(Thailand) Chanon Inta	Kalex				15	Ret			14	DNS	Ret	14	5
30	(Romania) Jacopo Hosciuc	Kalex	14	16	15	WD	WD							3
31	(France) Charles Aubrie	Kalex	DNQ	Ret	18	16	17	14	17	DNQ	21	20	Ret	2
32	(Germany) Jona Eisenkolb	Kalex	DNQ	DNQ	DNQ	WD	WD	DNQ	DNQ	15	20	19	DNQ	1
33	(India) Geoffrey Emmanuel	Kalex								16				0
34	(China) Jinlin Li	Kalex		DNQ	DNQ	17	Ret	DNQ	DNQ	WD	WD	WD	DNQ	0
35	(Japan) Yosuke Hosaka	Kalex									19	18	16	0
36	(Italy) Lorenzo Sommariva	Kalex											17	0
	(Norway) Ola Nesbakken	Boscoscuro									WD	WD	DNQ	0
	(Morocco) Anas Sorhmat	Kalex								DNQ				0
	(Spain) Álex Millán	Kalex											DNQ	0
	(Italy) Mattia Pasini	Boscoscuro	WD			WD	WD							0
	(Spain) Álex Escrig	Forward	WD											0
	(Spain) Borja Gómez	Kalex	WD											0
Pos.	Rider	Bike	MIS (Italy)	EST1 (Portugal)		CAT (Spain)		POR (Portugal)		JER (Spain)	ARA (Spain)		EST2 (Portugal)	Points

=== Constructor championship ===
Pos.	Constructor	MIS (Italy)	EST1 (Portugal)		BAR (Spain)		POR (Portugal)		JER (Spain)	ARA (Spain)		EST2 (Portugal)	Points
1	(Germany) Kalex	2	3	1	1	1	1	1	1	2	1	1	266
2	(Italy) Boscoscuro	1	1	2	4	4	2	2	2	1	3	2	217
3	(Switzerland) Forward		2	8	2	2	9	7					84
Pos.	Constructor	MIS (Italy)	EST1 (Portugal)		BAR (Spain)		POR (Portugal)		JER (Spain)	ARA (Spain)		EST2 (Portugal)	Points
