= 2026 Hungarian motorcycle Grand Prix =

Motorcycle races in Balatonfőkajár

(Hungary) 2026 Hungarian Grand Prix
Race details
- Race 8 of 22 races in the 2026 Grand Prix motorcycle racing season
- Date: 7 June 2026
- Official name: Grand Prix of Hungary
- Location: Balaton Park Circuit; Balatonfőkajár, Veszprém County, Hungary
- Course: Permanent racing facility; 4.075 km (2.532 mi)

MotoGP
Pole position
| Rider | (Spain) Marc Márquez | Ducati |
| Time | 1:36.785 | |
Fastest lap
| Rider | (Spain) Marc Márquez | Ducati |
| Time | 1:38.313 on lap 20 | |
Podium
| First | (Spain) Marc Márquez | Ducati |
| Second | (Spain) Pedro Acosta | KTM |
| Third | (Italy) Francesco Bagnaia | Ducati |

Moto2
Pole position
| Rider | (Spain) Izan Guevara | Boscoscuro |
| Time | 1:40.280 | |
Fastest lap
| Rider | (Spain) Manuel González | Kalex |
| Time | 1:40.893 on lap 17 | |
Podium
| First | (Spain) Manuel González | Kalex |
| Second | (Czech Republic) Filip Salač | Kalex |
| Third | (Australia) Senna Agius | Kalex |

Moto3
Pole position
| Rider | (Spain) David Almansa | KTM |
| Time | 1:45.686 | |
Fastest lap
| Rider | (Spain) David Almansa | KTM |
| Time | 1:45.836 on lap 12 | |
Podium
| First | (Spain) Máximo Quiles | KTM |
| Second | (Spain) David Almansa | KTM |
| Third | (Spain) Álvaro Carpe | KTM |

The 2026 Hungarian motorcycle Grand Prix (officially known as the Grand Prix of Hungary) was the eighth round of the 2026 Grand Prix motorcycle racing season. All races were held at the Balaton Park Circuit in Balatonfőkajár on 7 June 2026.

== Qualifying ==
=== MotoGP ===
Fastest session lap

| Pos. | No. | Rider | Team | Constructor | Q1 | Q2 | Final grid | Row |
|---|---|---|---|---|---|---|---|---|
| 1 | 93 | (Spain) Marc Márquez | Ducati Lenovo Team | Ducati | Qualified to Q2 | 1:36.785 | 1 | 1 |
| 2 | 37 | (Spain) Pedro Acosta | Red Bull KTM Factory Racing | KTM | Qualified to Q2 | 1:36.838 | 2 | 1 |
| 3 | 54 | (Spain) Fermín Aldeguer | BK8 Gresini Racing MotoGP | Ducati | Qualified to Q2 | 1:37.125 | 3 | 1 |
| 4 | 49 | (Italy) Fabio Di Giannantonio | Pertamina Enduro VR46 Racing Team | Ducati | Qualified to Q2 | 1:37.232 | 4 | 2 |
| 5 | 63 | (Italy) Francesco Bagnaia | Ducati Lenovo Team | Ducati | 1:37.443 | 1:37.317 | 5 | 2 |
| 6 | 72 | (Italy) Marco Bezzecchi | Aprilia Racing | Aprilia | Qualified to Q2 | 1:37.428 | 6 | 2 |
| 7 | 25 | (Spain) Raúl Fernández | SuperFile Trackhouse MotoGP Team | Aprilia | Qualified to Q2 | 1:37.548 | 7 | 3 |
| 8 | 89 | (Spain) Jorge Martín | Aprilia Racing | Aprilia | Qualified to Q2 | 1:37.574 | 8 | 3 |
| 9 | 10 | (Italy) Luca Marini | Honda HRC Castrol | Honda | 1:37.594 | 1:37.605 | 9 | 3 |
| 10 | 79 | (Japan) Ai Ogura | SuperFile Trackhouse MotoGP Team | Aprilia | Qualified to Q2 | 1:37.629 | 10 | 4 |
| 11 | 11 | (Brazil) Diogo Moreira | Pro Honda LCR | Honda | Qualified to Q2 | 1:37.850 | 11 | 4 |
| 12 | 12 | (Australia) Jack Miller | Prima Pramac Yamaha MotoGP | Yamaha | Qualified to Q2 | 1:38.241 | 12 | 4 |
| 13 | 36 | (Spain) Joan Mir | Honda HRC Castrol | Honda | 1:37.756 | N/A | 13 | 5 |
| 14 | 23 | (Italy) Enea Bastianini | Red Bull KTM Tech3 | KTM | 1:37.815 | N/A | 14 | 5 |
| 15 | 20 | (France) Fabio Quartararo | Monster Energy Yamaha MotoGP Team | Yamaha | 1:37.965 | N/A | 15 | 5 |
| 16 | 27 | (Spain) Iker Lecuona | BK8 Gresini Racing MotoGP | Ducati | 1:38.024 | N/A | 16 | 6 |
| 17 | 33 | (South Africa) Brad Binder | Red Bull KTM Factory Racing | KTM | 1:38.068 | N/A | 17 | 6 |
| 18 | 7 | (Turkey) Toprak Razgatlıoğlu | Prima Pramac Yamaha MotoGP | Yamaha | 1:38.074 | N/A | 18 | 6 |
| 19 | 21 | (Italy) Franco Morbidelli | Pertamina Enduro VR46 Racing Team | Ducati | 1:38.234 | N/A | 19 | 7 |
| 20 | 42 | (Spain) Álex Rins | Monster Energy Yamaha MotoGP Team | Yamaha | 1:38.469 | N/A | 20 | 7 |
| 21 | 12 | (Spain) Maverick Viñales | Red Bull KTM Tech3 | KTM | 1:38.469 | N/A | 21 | 7 |
| 22 | 35 | (United Kingdom) Cal Crutchlow | Castrol Honda LCR | Honda | 1'39.284 | N/A | 22 | 8 |
Official MotoGP Qualifying 1 Report
Official MotoGP Qualifying 2 Report
Official MotoGP Grid Report

== MotoGP Sprint ==
The MotoGP Sprint was held on 6 June 2026.

| Pos. | No. | Rider | Team | Manufacturer | Laps | Time/Retired | Grid | Points |
|---|---|---|---|---|---|---|---|---|
| 1 | 93 | (Spain) Marc Márquez | Ducati Lenovo Team | Ducati | 13 | 21:22.047 | 1 | 12 |
| 2 | 37 | (Spain) Pedro Acosta | Red Bull KTM Factory Racing | KTM | 13 | +1.548 | 2 | 9 |
| 3 | 72 | (Italy) Marco Bezzecchi | Aprilia Racing | Aprilia | 13 | +2.722 | 6 | 7 |
| 4 | 25 | (Spain) Raúl Fernández | SuperFile Trackhouse MotoGP Team | Aprilia | 13 | +3.973 | 7 | 6 |
| 5 | 54 | (Spain) Fermín Aldeguer | BK8 Gresini Racing MotoGP | Ducati | 13 | +4.366 | 3 | 5 |
| 6 | 89 | (Spain) Jorge Martín | Aprilia Racing | Aprilia | 13 | +5.708 | 8 | 4 |
| 7 | 11 | (Brazil) Diogo Moreira | Pro Honda LCR | Honda | 13 | +6.285 | 11 | 3 |
| 8 | 23 | (Italy) Enea Bastianini | Red Bull KTM Tech3 | KTM | 13 | +7.587 | 14 | 2 |
| 9 | 63 | (Italy) Francesco Bagnaia | Ducati Lenovo Team | Ducati | 13 | +8.237 | 5 | 1 |
| 10 | 49 | (Italy) Fabio Di Giannantonio | Pertamina Enduro VR46 Racing Team | Ducati | 13 | +8.469 | 4 | |
| 11 | 79 | (Japan) Ai Ogura | SuperFile Trackhouse MotoGP Team | Aprilia | 13 | +11.609 | 10 | |
| 12 | 10 | (Italy) Luca Marini | Honda HRC Castrol | Honda | 13 | +12.070 | 9 | |
| 13 | 7 | (Turkey) Toprak Razgatlıoğlu | Prima Pramac Yamaha MotoGP | Yamaha | 13 | +14.173 | 18 | |
| 14 | 43 | (Australia) Jack Miller | Prima Pramac Yamaha MotoGP | Yamaha | 13 | +15.799 | 12 | |
| 15 | 36 | (Spain) Joan Mir | Honda HRC Castrol | Honda | 13 | +15.961 | 13 | |
| 16 | 33 | (South Africa) Brad Binder | Red Bull KTM Factory Racing | KTM | 13 | +16.376 | 17 | |
| 17 | 20 | (France) Fabio Quartararo | Monster Energy Yamaha MotoGP Team | Yamaha | 13 | +17.070 | 15 | |
| 18 | 27 | (Spain) Iker Lecuona | BK8 Gresini Racing MotoGP | Ducati | 13 | +17.381 | 16 | |
| 19 | 12 | (Spain) Maverick Viñales | Red Bull KTM Tech3 | KTM | 13 | +19.490 | 21 | |
| 20 | 21 | (Italy) Franco Morbidelli | Pertamina Enduro VR46 Racing Team | Ducati | 13 | +20.662 | 19 | |
| 21 | 42 | (Spain) Álex Rins | Monster Energy Yamaha MotoGP Team | Yamaha | 13 | +24.063 | 20 | |
| 22 | 35 | (United Kingdom) Cal Crutchlow | Castrol Honda LCR | Honda | 13 | +30.947 | 22 | |
Fastest sprint lap: (Spain) Marc Márquez (Ducati) - 1:37.901 (lap 2)
Official MotoGP Sprint Report

== Race ==
=== MotoGP ===
| Pos. | No. | Rider | Team | Manufacturer | Laps | Time/Retired | Grid | Points |
|---|---|---|---|---|---|---|---|---|
| 1 | 93 | (Spain) Marc Márquez | Ducati Lenovo Team | Ducati | 26 | 42:55.325 | 1 | 25 |
| 2 | 37 | (Spain) Pedro Acosta | Red Bull KTM Factory Racing | KTM | 26 | +1.343 | 2 | 20 |
| 3 | 63 | (Italy) Francesco Bagnaia | Ducati Lenovo Team | Ducati | 26 | +11.632 | 5 | 16 |
| 4 | 79 | (Japan) Ai Ogura | SuperFile Trackhouse MotoGP Team | Aprilia | 26 | +15.539 | 10 | 13 |
| 5 | 10 | (Italy) Luca Marini | Honda HRC Castrol | Honda | 26 | +18.669 | 9 | 11 |
| 6 | 11 | (Brazil) Diogo Moreira | Pro Honda LCR | Honda | 26 | +21.794 | 11 | 10 |
| 7 | 27 | (Spain) Iker Lecuona | BK8 Gresini Racing MotoGP | Ducati | 26 | +22.815 | 16 | 9 |
| 8 | 43 | (Australia) Jack Miller | Prima Pramac Yamaha MotoGP | Yamaha | 26 | +23.283 | 12 | 8 |
| 9 | 23 | (Italy) Enea Bastianini | Red Bull KTM Tech3 | KTM | 26 | +24.491 | 14 | 7 |
| 10 | 33 | (South Africa) Brad Binder | Red Bull KTM Factory Racing | KTM | 26 | +24.601 | 17 | 6 |
| 11 | 7 | (Turkey) Toprak Razgatlıoğlu | Prima Pramac Yamaha MotoGP | Yamaha | 26 | +25.135 | 18 | 5 |
| 12 | 49 | (Italy) Fabio Di Giannantonio | Pertamina Enduro VR46 Racing Team | Ducati | 26 | +28.386 | 4 | 4 |
| 13 | 42 | (Spain) Álex Rins | Monster Energy Yamaha MotoGP Team | Yamaha | 26 | +29.207 | 20 | 3 |
| 14 | 21 | (Italy) Franco Morbidelli | Pertamina Enduro VR46 Racing Team | Ducati | 26 | +31.333 | 19 | 2 |
| 15 | 12 | (Spain) Maverick Viñales | Red Bull KTM Tech3 | KTM | 26 | +48.536 (Note: 16-second penalty due to low tyre pressure.) | 21 | 1 |
| 16 | 35 | (United Kingdom) Cal Crutchlow | Castrol Honda LCR | Honda | 26 | +54.604 | 22 | |
| Ret | 20 | (France) Fabio Quartararo | Monster Energy Yamaha MotoGP Team | Yamaha | 22 | Technical | 15 | |
| Ret | 36 | (Spain) Joan Mir | Honda HRC Castrol | Honda | 14 | Accident | 13 | |
| Ret | 25 | (Spain) Raúl Fernández | SuperFile Trackhouse MotoGP Team | Aprilia | 0 | Collision | 7 | |
| Ret | 54 | (Spain) Fermín Aldeguer | BK8 Gresini Racing MotoGP | Ducati | 0 | Collision | 3 | |
| Ret | 72 | (Italy) Marco Bezzecchi | Aprilia Racing | Aprilia | 0 | Collision | 6 | |
| Ret | 89 | (Spain) Jorge Martín | Aprilia Racing | Aprilia | 0 | Collision | 8 | |
Fastest lap: (Spain) Marc Márquez (Ducati) – 1:38.313 (lap 20)
Official MotoGP Race Report

=== Moto2 ===
| Pos. | No. | Rider | Team | Manufacturer | Laps | Time/Retired | Grid | Points |
|---|---|---|---|---|---|---|---|---|
| 1 | 18 | (Spain) Manuel González | Liqui Moly Dynavolt Intact GP | Kalex | 22 | 37:10.278 | 4 | 25 |
| 2 | 12 | (Czech Republic) Filip Salač | OnlyFans American Racing Team | Kalex | 22 | +1.552 | 2 | 20 |
| 3 | 81 | (Australia) Senna Agius | Liqui Moly Dynavolt Intact GP | Kalex | 22 | +3.925 | 3 | 16 |
| 4 | 80 | (Colombia) David Alonso | CFMoto Inde Aspar Team | Kalex | 22 | +4.367 | 9 | 13 |
| 5 | 96 | (Spain) Daniel Holgado | CFMoto Inde Aspar Team | Kalex | 22 | +9.561 | 6 | 11 |
| 6 | 28 | (Spain) Izan Guevara | Blu Cru Pramac Yamaha Moto2 | Boscoscuro | 22 | +11.143 | 1 | 10 |
| 7 | 13 | (Italy) Celestino Vietti | MB Conveyors SpeedRS Team | Boscoscuro | 22 | +14.612 | 12 | 9 |
| 8 | 21 | (Spain) Alonso López | Italjet Gresini Moto2 | Kalex | 22 | +18.652 | 8 | 8 |
| 9 | 54 | (Spain) Alberto Ferrández | Blu Cru Pramac Yamaha Moto2 | Boscoscuro | 22 | +18.808 | 17 | 7 |
| 10 | 14 | (Italy) Tony Arbolino | Reds Fantic Racing | Kalex | 22 | +20.885 | 15 | 6 |
| 11 | 98 | (Spain) José Antonio Rueda | Red Bull KTM Ajo | Kalex | 22 | +22.404 | 14 | 5 |
| 12 | 7 | (Belgium) Barry Baltus | Reds Fantic Racing | Kalex | 22 | +22.564 | 11 | 4 |
| 13 | 84 | (Netherlands) Zonta van den Goorbergh | Momoven Idrofoglia RW Racing Team | Kalex | 22 | +24.263 | 13 | 3 |
| 14 | 72 | (Japan) Taiyo Furusato | Idemitsu Honda Team Asia | Kalex | 22 | +27.513 | 20 | 2 |
| 15 | 16 | (United States) Joe Roberts | OnlyFans American Racing Team | Kalex | 22 | +27.762 | 22 | 1 |
| 16 | 99 | (Spain) Adrián Huertas | Italtrans Racing Team | Kalex | 22 | +29.225 | 27 | |
| 17 | 53 | (Turkey) Deniz Öncü | Elf Marc VDS Racing Team | Boscoscuro | 22 | +31.425 | 23 | |
| 18 | 32 | (Italy) Luca Lunetta | MB Conveyors SpeedRS Team | Boscoscuro | 22 | +31.722 | 21 | |
| 19 | 71 | (Japan) Ayumu Sasaki | Momoven Idrofoglia RW Racing Team | Kalex | 22 | +33.763 | 19 | |
| 20 | 3 | (Spain) Sergio García | Italtrans Racing Team | Kalex | 22 | +40.676 | 25 | |
| 21 | 11 | (Spain) Álex Escrig | Klint Racing Team | Forward | 22 | +43.846 | 5 | |
| 22 | 22 | (Australia) Jacob Roulstone | Idemitsu Honda Team Asia | Kalex | 22 | +1:04.501 | 26 | |
| 23 | 95 | (Netherlands) Collin Veijer | Red Bull KTM Ajo | Kalex | 22 | +1 lap | 7 | |
| Ret | 85 | (Spain) Xabi Zurutuza | Klint Racing Team | Forward | 19 | Technical | 24 | |
| Ret | 4 | (Spain) Iván Ortolá | QJMotor – Exocom – MSi | Kalex | 3 | Collision | 18 | |
| Ret | 17 | (Spain) Daniel Muñoz | Italtrans Racing Team | Kalex | 3 | Collision | 10 | |
| Ret | 44 | (Spain) Arón Canet | Elf Marc VDS Racing Team | Boscoscuro | 0 | Accident | 16 | |
| DNS | 36 | (Spain) Ángel Piqueras | QJMotor – Exocom – MSi | Kalex | | Did not start | | |
Fastest lap: (Spain) Manuel González (Kalex) – 1:40.893 (lap 17)
Official Moto2 Race Report

=== Moto3 ===
The race was originally scheduled to run a total of 20 laps, but was red-flagged due to a collision on lap 20 involving David Muñoz, Valentín Perrone and Brian Uriarte. The classification was taken from the end of lap 19, with Muñoz and Perrone not classified due to not returning to the pit lane within 5 minutes of the red flag.

| Pos. | No. | Rider | Team | Manufacturer | Laps | Time/Retired | Grid | Points |
|---|---|---|---|---|---|---|---|---|
| 1 | 28 | (Spain) Máximo Quiles | CFMoto Gaviota Aspar Team | KTM | 19 | 33:39.745 | 2 | 25 |
| 2 | 22 | (Spain) David Almansa | Liqui Moly Dynavolt Intact GP | KTM | 19 | +3.147 | 1 | 20 |
| 3 | 83 | (Spain) Álvaro Carpe | Red Bull KTM Ajo | KTM | 19 | +7.037 | 18 | 16 |
| 4 | 51 | (Spain) Brian Uriarte | Red Bull KTM Ajo | KTM | 19 | +7.194 | 3 | 13 |
| 5 | 27 | (Finland) Rico Salmela | Red Bull KTM Tech3 | KTM | 19 | +7.374 | 6 | 11 |
| 6 | 11 | (Spain) Adrián Cruces | CIP Green Power | KTM | 19 | +19.231 | 8 | 10 |
| 7 | 97 | (Argentina) Marco Morelli | CFMoto Gaviota Aspar Team | KTM | 19 | +20.276 | 7 | 9 |
| 8 | 54 | (Spain) Jesús Ríos | Rivacold Snipers Team | Honda | 19 | +24.202 | 5 | 8 |
| 9 | 67 | (Republic of Ireland) Casey O'Gorman | Sic58 Squadra Corse | Honda | 19 | +27.130 | 12 | 7 |
| 10 | 31 | (Spain) Adrián Fernández | Leopard Racing | Honda | 19 | +27.266 | 11 | 6 |
| 11 | 19 | (United Kingdom) Scott Ogden | CIP Green Power | KTM | 19 | +27.450 | 21 | 5 |
| 12 | 66 | (Australia) Joel Kelso | Gryd – MLav Racing | Honda | 19 | +27.492 | 10 | 4 |
| 13 | 78 | (Spain) Joel Esteban | LevelUp – MTA | KTM | 19 | +27.730 | 20 | 3 |
| 14 | 14 | (New Zealand) Cormac Buchanan | Code Motorsports | KTM | 19 | +28.570 | 14 | 2 |
| 15 | 18 | (Italy) Matteo Bertelle | LevelUp – MTA | KTM | 19 | +30.442 | 15 | 1 |
| 16 | 9 | (Indonesia) Veda Pratama | Honda Team Asia | Honda | 19 | +33.461 | 9 | |
| 17 | 6 | (Japan) Ryusei Yamanaka | Aeon Credit – MT Helmets – MSi | KTM | 19 | +33.592 | 24 | |
| 18 | 8 | (United Kingdom) Eddie O'Shea | Gryd – MLav Racing | Honda | 19 | +36.542 | 22 | |
| 19 | 5 | (Austria) Leo Rammerstorfer | Sic58 Squadra Corse | Honda | 19 | +43.876 | 26 | |
| 20 | 32 | (Japan) Zen Mitani | Honda Team Asia | Honda | 19 | +45.158 | 23 | |
| NC | 64 | (Spain) David Muñoz | Liqui Moly Dynavolt Intact GP | KTM | 19 | +6.875 | 17 | |
| NC | 73 | (Argentina) Valentín Perrone | Red Bull KTM Tech3 | KTM | 19 | +7.489 | 4 | |
| Ret | 13 | (Malaysia) Hakim Danish | Aeon Credit – MT Helmets – MSi | KTM | 12 | Collision damage | 19 | |
| Ret | 10 | (Italy) Nicola Carraro | Rivacold Snipers Team | Honda | 9 | Accident | 25 | |
| Ret | 21 | (South Africa) Ruché Moodley | Code Motorsports | KTM | 0 | Collision | 13 | |
| Ret | 94 | (Italy) Guido Pini | Leopard Racing | Honda | 0 | Collision | 16 | |
Fastest lap: (Spain) David Almansa (KTM) – 1:45.836 (lap 12)
Official Moto3 Race Report

== Championship standings after the race ==
Below are the standings for the top five riders, constructors, and teams after the round.

=== MotoGP ===
Riders' Championship standings

| | Pos. | Rider | Points |
|---|---|---|---|
| | 1 | (Italy) Marco Bezzecchi | 180 |
| | 2 | (Spain) Jorge Martín | 160 |
| | 3 | (Italy) Fabio Di Giannantonio | 138 |
| | 4 | (Spain) Pedro Acosta | 132 |
| 3 | 5 | (Spain) Marc Márquez | 108 |

Constructors' Championship standings

| Pos. | Constructor | Points |
|---|---|---|
| 1 | (Italy) Aprilia | 238 |
| 2 | (Italy) Ducati | 225 |
| 3 | (Austria) KTM | 154 |
| 4 | (Japan) Honda | 84 |
| 5 | (Japan) Yamaha | 49 |

Teams' Championship standings

| | Pos. | Team | Points |
|---|---|---|---|
| | 1 | (Italy) Aprilia Racing | 340 |
| 2 | 2 | (Italy) Ducati Lenovo Team | 207 |
| 1 | 3 | (United States) SuperFile Trackhouse MotoGP Team | 198 |
| 1 | 4 | (Austria) Red Bull KTM Factory Racing | 180 |
| 2 | 5 | (Italy) Pertamina Enduro VR46 Racing Team | 178 |

=== Moto2 ===
Riders' Championship standings

| Pos. | Rider | Points |
|---|---|---|
| 1 | (Spain) Manuel González | 154.5 |
| 2 | (Spain) Izan Guevara | 105 |
| 3 | (Italy) Celestino Vietti | 102 |
| 4 | (Australia) Senna Agius | 94 |
| 5 | (Spain) Daniel Holgado | 76 |

Constructors' Championship standings

| Pos. | Constructor | Points |
|---|---|---|
| 1 | (Germany) Kalex | 182.5 |
| 2 | (Italy) Boscoscuro | 126 |
| 3 | (Switzerland) Forward | 30 |

Teams' Championship standings

| | Pos. | Team | Points |
|---|---|---|---|
| | 1 | (Germany) Liqui Moly Dynavolt Intact GP | 248.5 |
| | 2 | (Spain) CFMoto Inde Aspar Team | 147 |
| 1 | 3 | (Italy) Blu Cru Pramac Yamaha Moto2 | 113.5 |
| 1 | 4 | (Italy) MB Conveyors SpeedRS Team | 109 |
| 4 | 5 | (United States) OnlyFans American Racing Team | 69 |

=== Moto3 ===
Riders' Championship standings

| | Pos. | Rider | Points |
|---|---|---|---|
| | 1 | (Spain) Máximo Quiles | 170 |
| | 2 | (Spain) Álvaro Carpe | 111 |
| 1 | 3 | (Argentina) Marco Morelli | 77 |
| 3 | 4 | (Spain) David Almansa | 76 |
| 1 | 5 | (Spain) Brian Uriarte | 72 |

Constructors' Championship standings

| Pos. | Constructor | Points |
|---|---|---|
| 1 | (Austria) KTM | 195 |
| 2 | (Japan) Honda | 109 |

Teams' Championship standings

| Pos. | Team | Points |
|---|---|---|
| 1 | (Spain) CFMoto Gaviota Aspar Team | 247 |
| 2 | (Finland) Red Bull KTM Ajo | 183 |
| 3 | (Germany) Liqui Moly Dynavolt Intact GP | 131 |
| 4 | (France) Red Bull KTM Tech3 | 95 |
| 5 | (Italy) LevelUp – MTA | 81 |

== Notes ==
| Previous race: 2026 Italian Grand Prix | FIM Grand Prix World Championship; 2026 season | Next race: 2026 Czech Republic Grand Prix |
| Previous race: 2025 Hungarian Grand Prix | Hungarian motorcycle Grand Prix | Next race: None |
