= 2025 MotoE World Championship =

7th running of the MotoE World Championship

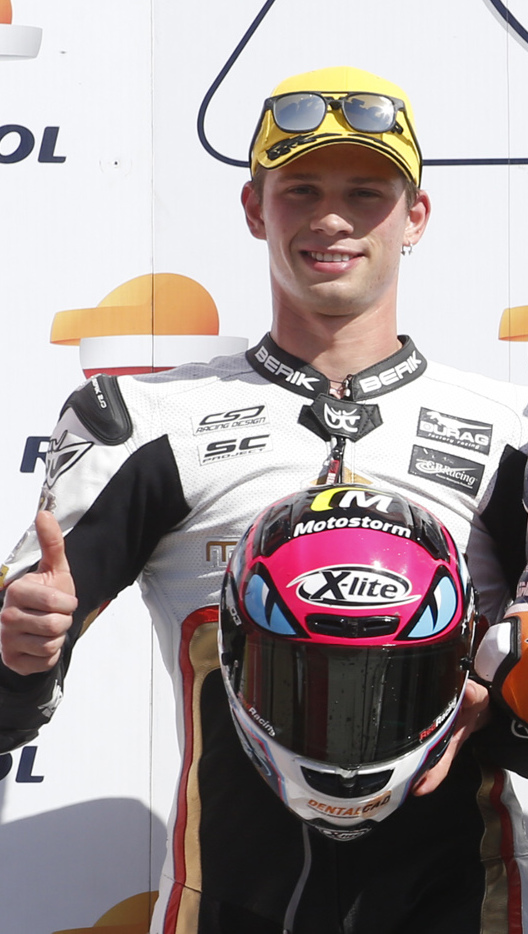
Alessandro Zaccone (pictured in 2019) was the 2025 MotoE World Riders' Champion.

The 2025 MotoE World Championship (known officially as the 2025 FIM Enel MotoE World Championship for sponsorship reasons) was the seventh and last season before the hiatus of the MotoE World Championship for electric motorcycle racing and was a part of the 77th Fédération Internationale de Motocyclisme (FIM) Road Racing World Championship season.

On 11 September 2025, it was announced that the FIM and Dorna Sports agreed to put the MotoE class on hiatus after the 2025 season.

Alessandro Zaccone became MotoE World Champion after finishing fourth in race 2 of the Portuguese round.

== Teams and riders ==
All teams used the series-specified Ducati V21L.

Team	No.	Rider	Rounds
(Italy) Aruba Cloud MotoE Team	19	(San Marino) Luca Bernardi	All
(Italy) Aruba Cloud MotoE Team	61	(Italy) Alessandro Zaccone	All
(Spain) MSi Racing Team	12	(Romania) Jacopo Hosciuc	All
(Spain) MSi Racing Team	99	(Spain) Óscar Gutiérrez	1, 3–7
(Spain) MSi Racing Team	35	(Spain) Diego Pérez	2
(Germany) Dynavolt Intact GP	1	(Spain) Héctor Garzó	All
(Germany) Dynavolt Intact GP	7	(Italy) Lorenzo Baldassarri	All
(Italy) Felo Gresini MotoE	11	(Italy) Matteo Ferrari	All
(Italy) Felo Gresini MotoE	72	(Italy) Alessio Finello	All
(Switzerland) Klint Forward Factory Team	6	(Spain) María Herrera	1–4, 6–7
(Switzerland) Klint Forward Factory Team	9	(Italy) Andrea Mantovani	All
(Monaco) LCR E-Team	40	(Italy) Mattia Casadei	All
(Monaco) LCR E-Team	51	(Brazil) Eric Granado	All
(Italy) Ongetta Sic58 Squadra Corse	28	(Italy) Tommaso Occhi	All
(Italy) Ongetta Sic58 Squadra Corse	77	(Italy) Raffaele Fusco	All
(Spain) Power Electronics Aspar Team	21	(Italy) Kevin Zannoni	All
(Spain) Power Electronics Aspar Team	81	(Spain) Jordi Torres	All
(Italy) Rivacold Snipers Team MotoE	29	(Italy) Nicholas Spinelli	All
(Italy) Rivacold Snipers Team MotoE	47	(Hungary) Tibor Erik Varga	All

Key
Regular rider
Replacement rider
Wildcard rider

== Calendar ==
The following Grands Prix took place in 2025:

Round	Date	Grand Prix	Circuit
1	10 May	Michelin Grand Prix of France	Bugatti Circuit, Le Mans
2	28 June	Motul Grand Prix of the Netherlands	TT Circuit Assen, Assen
3	16 August	bwin Grand Prix of Austria	Red Bull Ring, Spielberg
4	23 August	Michelin Grand Prix of Hungary	Balaton Park Circuit, Balatonfőkajár
5	6 September	Monster Energy Grand Prix of Catalonia	Circuit de Barcelona-Catalunya, Montmeló
6	13 September	Red Bull Grand Prix of San Marino and the Rimini Riviera	Misano World Circuit, Misano Adriatico
7	8 November	Qatar Airways Grand Prix of Portugal	Algarve International Circuit, Portimão

=== Grand Prix locations ===
Location of Grands Prix in 2025.

== Results and standings ==
=== Grands Prix ===
Round	Grand Prix	Pole position	Fastest lap	Winning rider	Winning team	Report
1	(France) French motorcycle Grand Prix	(Italy) Alessandro Zaccone	(Italy) Andrea Mantovani	(Spain) Óscar Gutiérrez	(Spain) Axxis-MSI	Report
1	(France) French motorcycle Grand Prix	(Italy) Alessandro Zaccone	(Italy) Mattia Casadei	(Italy) Mattia Casadei	(Monaco) LCR E-Team	Report
2	(Netherlands) Dutch TT	(Italy) Mattia Casadei	(Italy) Andrea Mantovani	(Italy) Andrea Mantovani	(Switzerland) Klint Forward Factory Team	Report
2	(Netherlands) Dutch TT	(Italy) Mattia Casadei	(Italy) Alessandro Zaccone	(Italy) Alessandro Zaccone	(Italy) Aruba Cloud MotoE Team	Report
3	(Austria) Austrian motorcycle Grand Prix	(Italy) Matteo Ferrari	(Spain) Óscar Gutiérrez	(Italy) Matteo Ferrari	(Italy) Felo Gresini MotoE	Report
3	(Austria) Austrian motorcycle Grand Prix	(Italy) Matteo Ferrari	(Italy) Matteo Ferrari	(Italy) Matteo Ferrari	(Italy) Felo Gresini MotoE	Report
4	(Hungary) Hungarian motorcycle Grand Prix	(Italy) Mattia Casadei	(Italy) Lorenzo Baldassarri	(Italy) Mattia Casadei	(Monaco) LCR E-Team	Report
4	(Hungary) Hungarian motorcycle Grand Prix	(Italy) Mattia Casadei	(Italy) Matteo Ferrari	(Italy) Mattia Casadei	(Monaco) LCR E-Team	Report
5	(Catalonia) Catalan motorcycle Grand Prix	(Brazil) Eric Granado	(Italy) Nicholas Spinelli	(Brazil) Eric Granado	(Monaco) LCR E-Team	Report
5	(Catalonia) Catalan motorcycle Grand Prix	(Brazil) Eric Granado	(Brazil) Eric Granado	(Brazil) Eric Granado	(Monaco) LCR E-Team	Report
6	San Marino and Rimini Riviera motorcycle Grand Prix	(Brazil) Eric Granado	(Brazil) Eric Granado	(Italy) Alessandro Zaccone	(Italy) Aruba Cloud MotoE Team	Report
6	San Marino and Rimini Riviera motorcycle Grand Prix	(Brazil) Eric Granado	(Spain) Héctor Garzó	(Italy) Matteo Ferrari	(Italy) Felo Gresini MotoE	Report
7	(Portugal) Portuguese motorcycle Grand Prix	(Italy) Alessandro Zaccone	(Romania) Jacopo Hosciuc	(Italy) Alessandro Zaccone	(Italy) Aruba Cloud MotoE Team	Report
7	(Portugal) Portuguese motorcycle Grand Prix	(Italy) Alessandro Zaccone	(Italy) Lorenzo Baldassarri	(Spain) Óscar Gutiérrez	(Spain) Axxis-MSI	Report

=== Riders' standings ===
Scoring system

Points were awarded to the top fifteen finishers. A rider had to finish the race to earn points.

Position	1st	2nd	3rd	4th	5th	6th	7th	8th	9th	10th	11th	12th	13th	14th	15th
Points	25	20	16	13	11	10	9	8	7	6	5	4	3	2	1

Pos.	Rider	Team	FRA (France)		NED (Netherlands)		AUT (Austria)		HUN (Hungary)		CAT (Catalonia)		RSM (San Marino)		POR (Portugal)		Pts
1	(Italy) Alessandro Zaccone	Aruba Cloud MotoE Team	3^{P}	Ret^{P}	2	1^{F}	7	6	5	6	4	8	1	4	1^{P}	4^{P}	198
2	(Italy) Mattia Casadei	LCR E-Team	5	1^{F}	16^{P}	6^{P}	Ret	2	1^{P}	1^{P}	Ret	3	9	3	4	2	188
3	(Italy) Matteo Ferrari	Felo Gresini MotoE	Ret	Ret	5	12	1^{P}	1^{P F}	4	3^{F}	3	14	5	1	6	6	168
4	(Brazil) Eric Granado	LCR E-Team	Ret	DNS	7	7	3	Ret	3	7	1^{P}	1^{P F}	4^{P F}	2^{P}	2	Ret	162
5	(Italy) Nicholas Spinelli	Rivacold Snipers Team MotoE	9	6	4	8	9	8	6	2	5^{F}	2	2	Ret	7	3	159
6	(Italy) Lorenzo Baldassarri	Dynavolt Intact GP	6	5	6	3	5	5	2^{F}	4	2	6	10	6	5	Ret^{F}	159
7	(Italy) Andrea Mantovani	Klint Forward Factory Team	2^{F}	7	1^{F}	2	8	10	10	9	8	Ret	3	14	14	10	135
8	(Italy) Kevin Zannoni	Power Electronics Aspar Team	4	2	8	11	13	17	8	10	6	4	6	5	8	9	122
9	(Spain) Héctor Garzó	Dynavolt Intact GP	WD	WD	9	5	2	3	7	5	7	7	8	Ret^{F}	12	5	115
10	(Spain) Óscar Gutiérrez	MSi Racing Team	1	Ret			4^{F}	7	9	Ret	12	9	11	7	Ret	1	104
11	(Spain) Jordi Torres	Power Electronics Aspar Team	7	3	3	4	10	9	Ret	11	9	Ret	7	Ret	9	7	104
12	(Romania) Jacopo Hosciuc	MSi Racing Team	11	8	10	9	12	11	Ret	8	11	5	15	8	3^{F}	Ret	84
13	(San Marino) Luca Bernardi	Aruba Cloud MotoE Team	13	9	Ret	13	14	13	Ret	12	13	10	12	9	10	8	56
14	(Italy) Alessio Finello	Felo Gresini MotoE	10	11	Ret	10	11	12	12	13	Ret	11	13	10	13	12	54
15	(Hungary) Tibor Erik Varga	Rivacold Snipers Team MotoE	12	10	11	14	6	4	Ret	DNS	10	Ret	14	Ret	Ret	14	50
16	(Spain) María Herrera	Klint Forward Factory Team	8	4	15	15	16	14	13	15			16	11	15	13	38
17	(Italy) Raffaele Fusco	Ongetta Sic58 Squadra Corse	Ret	12	13	17	15	15	11	14	14	12	17	12	11	11	36
18	(Italy) Tommaso Occhi	Ongetta Sic58 Squadra Corse	Ret	13	14	Ret	17	16	14	16	15	13	18	13	16	15	15
19	(Spain) Diego Pérez	MSi Racing Team			12	16											4
Pos.	Rider	Team	FRA (France)		NED (Netherlands)		AUT (Austria)		HUN (Hungary)		CAT (Catalonia)		RSM (San Marino)		POR (Portugal)		Pts

Race key
Colour	Result
Gold	Winner
Silver	2nd place
Bronze	3rd place
Green	Points finish
Blue	Non-points finish
Blue	Non-classified finish (NC)
Purple	Retired (Ret)
Red	Did not qualify (DNQ)
Black	Disqualified (DSQ)
White	Did not start (DNS)
White	Withdrew (WD)
White	Race cancelled (C)
Blank	Did not practice (DNP)
Blank	Excluded (EX)
Blank	Did not arrive (DNA)
Blank	Did not enter (empty cell)
Annotation	Meaning
P	Pole position
F	Fastest lap
Rider key
Colour	Meaning
Light blue	Rookie rider

=== Teams' standings ===
The teams' standings were based on results obtained by regular and substitute riders.

Pos.	Team	Bike No.	FRA (France)		NED (Netherlands)		AUT (Austria)		HUN (Hungary)		CAT (Catalonia)		RSM (San Marino)		POR (Portugal)		Pts
1	(Monaco) LCR E-Team	40	5	1^{F}	16^{P}	6^{P}	Ret	2	1^{P}	1^{P}	Ret	3	9	3	4	2	350
1	(Monaco) LCR E-Team	51	Ret	DNS	7	7	3	Ret	3	7	1^{P}	1^{P F}	4^{P F}	2^{P}	2	Ret	350
2	(Germany) Dynavolt Intact GP	1	WD	WD	9	5	2	3	7	5	7	7	8	Ret^{F}	12	5	274
2	(Germany) Dynavolt Intact GP	7	6	5	6	3	5	5	2^{F}	4	2	6	10	6	5	Ret^{F}	274
3	(Italy) Aruba Cloud MotoE Team	19	13	11	Ret	13	14	13	Ret	12	13	10	12	9	10	8	254
3	(Italy) Aruba Cloud MotoE Team	61	3^{P}	Ret^{P}	2	1^{F}	7	6	5	6	4	8	1	4	1^{P}	4^{P}	254
4	(Spain) Power Electronics Aspar Team	21	4	2	8	11	13	17	8	10	6	4	6	5	8	9	226
4	(Spain) Power Electronics Aspar Team	81	7	3	3	4	10	9	Ret	11	9	Ret	7	Ret	9	7	226
5	(Italy) Felo Gresini MotoE	11	Ret	Ret	5	12	1^{P}	1^{P F}	4	3^{F}	3	14	5	1	6	6	222
5	(Italy) Felo Gresini MotoE	72	10	11	Ret	10	11	12	12	13	Ret	11	13	10	13	12	222
6	(Italy) Rivacold Snipers Team MotoE	29	9	6	4	8	9	8	6	2	5^{F}	2	2	Ret	7	3	209
6	(Italy) Rivacold Snipers Team MotoE	47	12	10	11	14	6	4	Ret	DNS	10	Ret	14	Ret	Ret	14	209
7	(Spain) MSi Racing Team	12	11	8	10	9	12	11	Ret	8	11	5	15	8	3^{F}	Ret	192
7	(Spain) MSi Racing Team	35			12	16											192
7	(Spain) MSi Racing Team	99	1	Ret			4^{F}	7	9	Ret	12	9	11	7	Ret	1	192
8	(Switzerland) Klint Forward Factory Team	6	8	4	15	15	16	14	13	15			16	11	15	13	173
8	(Switzerland) Klint Forward Factory Team	9	2^{F}	7	1^{F}	2	8	10	10	9	8	Ret	3	14	14	10	173
9	(Italy) Ongetta Sic58 Squadra Corse	28	Ret	13	14	Ret	17	16	14	16	15	13	18	13	16	15	51
9	(Italy) Ongetta Sic58 Squadra Corse	77	Ret	12	13	17	15	15	11	14	14	12	17	12	11	11	51
Pos.	Team	Bike No.	FRA (France)		NED (Netherlands)		AUT (Austria)		HUN (Hungary)		CAT (Catalonia)		RSM (San Marino)		POR (Portugal)		Pts
