= Álex Escrig =

Spanish motorcycle racer

- Nationality: Spanish
- Born: 21 February 2004 (age 22); Valencia, Spain
- Current team: Klint Racing Team
- Bike number: 11
Motorcycle racing career statistics
Moto2 World Championship
Active years	2022–
Manufacturers	MV Agusta, Forward
2025 championship position	22nd (25 pts)
Starts / Wins / Podiums / Poles / F. laps / Points; 66 / 0 / 2 / 1 / 1 / 113
MotoE World Championship
Active years	2022
Manufacturers	Energica
Championships	0
2022 championship position	9th (79 pts)
Starts / Wins / Podiums / Poles / F. laps / Points; 12 / 0 / 0 / 0 / 0 / 79

Álex Escrig Reche (born 21 February 2004) is a Spanish Grand Prix motorcycle racer competing in the 2026 Moto2 World Championship for Klint Racing Team. He previously competed in the FIM CEV Moto2 European Championship, finishing third overall in 2022. Escrig also won the FIM CEV Superstock 600 European Championship in 2021. He previously participated in the 2022 MotoE World Cup for Tech3 E-Racing, where he finished ninth in the standings, scoring points in all 12 races.

== Career ==
=== MotoE World Cup ===
Escrig participated for Tech3 E-Racing in the 2022 MotoE World Cup alongside Héctor Garzó. He scored points in all 12 races and finished ninth in the standings with 79 points.

=== Moto2 World Championship ===
Escrig made his Moto2 World Championship debut at the 2022 Valencian Community Grand Prix for MV Agusta Forward Racing as a wildcard rider.

Escrig signed with Forward Racing to compete with the team for the 2023 Moto2 World Championship, replacing Simone Corsi and joining Marcos Ramírez.

== Career statistics ==
=== Red Bull MotoGP Rookies Cup ===
==== Races by year ====
(key) (Races in bold indicate pole position, races in italics indicate fastest lap)

Year	1	2	3	4	5	6	7	8	9	10	11	12	Pos	Pts
2019	JER1; 12	JER2; 9	MUG; 12	ASS1; Ret	ASS2; 13	SAC1; 10	SAC2; 9	**RBR1**; 19	**RBR2**; DNS	MIS; 9	ARA1; 3	ARA2; 9	11th	61
2020	RBR1; Ret	RBR2; 15	RBR3; 13	RBR4; Ret	ARA1; 13	ARA2; Ret	ARA3; 14	ARA4; 16	VAL1; 5	VAL2; 12	VAL3; 7	VAL4; 7	14th	42

=== FIM CEV Superstock 600 European Championship ===
==== Races by year ====
(key) (Races in bold indicate pole position, races in italics indicate fastest lap)

Year	Bike	1	2	3	4	5	6	7	8	9	10	11	Pos	Pts
2021	Yamaha	EST1; 1	EST2; 1	VAL; 1	CAT1; 1	CAT2; 1	POR1; 1	POR2; 1	ARA1; 1	JER; 1	JER; 1	VAL; 2	1st	270

=== FIM Moto2 European Championship ===
==== Races by year ====
(key) (Races in bold indicate pole position, races in italics indicate fastest lap)

Year	Bike	1	2	3	4	5	6	7	8	9	10	11	Pos	Pts
2022	Kalex	EST1; 3	EST2; 7	VAL; 2	CAT1; 3	CAT2; 4	JER; 1	POR1; 1	POR2; 3	ARA1	ARA2	VAL; 2	3rd	160
2024	Forward	MIS; WD	EST1	EST2	CAT1	CAT2	POR1	POR2	JER	ARA1	ARA2	EST	NC	0

=== Grand Prix motorcycle racing ===
==== By season ====
Season	Class	Motorcycle	Team	Race	Win	Podium	Pole	FLap	Pts	Plcd
2022	MotoE	Energica	Tech3 E-Racing	12	0	0	0	0	79	9th
2022	Moto2	MV Agusta	MV Agusta Forward Racing	1	0	0	0	0	0	37th
2023	Moto2	Forward	Forward Team	9	0	0	0	0	3	27th
2024	Moto2	Forward	Klint Forward Factory Team	18	0	0	0	0	0	33rd
2025	Moto2	Forward	Klint Forward Factory Team	19	0	0	0	0	25	22nd
2026	Moto2	Forward	Klint Racing Team	19	0	2	1	1	85*	12th*
Total				**78**	**0**	**2**	**1**	**1**	**192**	

==== By class ====
Class	Seasons	1st GP	1st pod	1st win	Race	Win	Podiums	Pole	FLap	Pts	WChmp
Moto2	2022–present	2022 Valencia	2026 British		66	0	2	1	1	113	0
MotoE	2022	2022 Spain			12	0	0	0	0	79	0
Total	2022–present				**78**	**0**	**2**	**1**	**1**	**192**	**0**

==== Races by year ====
(key) (Races in bold indicate pole position; races in italics indicate fastest lap)

Year	Class	Bike	1	2	3	4	5	6	7	8	9	10	11	12	13	14	15	16	17	18	19	20	21	22	Pos	Pts
2022	MotoE	Energica	SPA1; 7	SPA2; 8	FRA1; 10	FRA2; 12	ITA1; 14	ITA2; 13	NED1; 14	NED2; 6^{‡}	AUT1; 6	AUT2; 5	RSM1; 5	RSM2; 8											9th	79
2022	Moto2	MV Agusta	QAT	INA	ARG	AME	POR	SPA	FRA	ITA	CAT	GER	NED	GBR	AUT	RSM	ARA	JPN	THA	AUS	MAL	VAL; 19			37th	0
2023	Moto2	Forward	POR; WD	ARG	AME	SPA; DNS	FRA; Ret	ITA	GER	NED; Ret	GBR; 18	AUT; DNS	CAT	RSM	IND	JPN	INA; 18	AUS; 19	THA; 19	MAL; 13	QAT; 20	VAL; 23			27th	3
2024	Moto2	Forward	QAT; 26	POR; 24	AME; 24	SPA; Ret	FRA	CAT; 18	ITA; 24	NED; 21	GER; 22	GBR; 22	AUT; Ret	ARA; 24	RSM	EMI; 24	INA; 19	JPN; 23	AUS; 17	THA; Ret	MAL; 20	SLD; 19			33rd	0
2025	Moto2	Forward	THA; DNS	ARG; 7	AME; 15	QAT; 21	SPA; 17	FRA	GBR	ARA; 21	ITA; 24	NED; 16	GER; 20	CZE; 21	AUT; 19	HUN; 17	CAT; 19	RSM; 25	JPN; 17	INA; Ret	AUS; 23	MAL; 8	POR; 12	VAL; 13	22nd	25
2026	Moto2	Forward	THA; 12^{‡}	BRA; 4	USA; 8	SPA; 9	FRA; 20	CAT; Ret	ITA; Ret	HUN; 21	CZE; 13	NED; 24	GER; 15	GBR; 3	ARA; 9	RSM; 10	AUT; Ret	JPN; 18	INA; Ret	AUS; C	MAL; 10	**QAT**; 3	POR	VAL	12th*	85*

^{‡} Half points awarded as less than half of the race distance (but at least three full laps) was completed.
* Season still in progress.
