= 2023 FIM Moto2 European Championship =

Edition of a motorsport season

2023 FIM Moto2 European Championship
Previous:	2022	Next:	2024
Support series: FIM Stock European Championship; JuniorGP World Championship; European Talent Cup

The 2023 FIM Moto2 European Championship is the second season after leaving the historical connection to CEV and the eighth under the FIM banner. This is the first season without the Stock bikes.

== Calendar ==
The provisional calendar was published in November 2022.

Round	Date	Circuit	Pole position	Fastest lap	Race winner	Winning constructor	ref
1	7 May	(Portugal) Estoril	(Australia) Senna Agius	(Australia) Senna Agius	(Australia) Senna Agius	(Germany) Kalex	
1	7 May	(Portugal) Estoril	(Australia) Senna Agius	(Australia) Senna Agius	(Australia) Senna Agius	(Germany) Kalex	
2	21 May	(Spain) Valencia	(Australia) Senna Agius	(Australia) Senna Agius	(Australia) Senna Agius	(Germany) Kalex	
3	4 June	(Spain) Jerez	(Spain) Carlos Tatay	(Spain) Carlos Tatay	(Spain) Carlos Tatay	(Germany) Kalex	
4	2 July	(Portugal) Portimão	(Australia) Senna Agius	(Australia) Senna Agius	(Australia) Senna Agius	(Germany) Kalex	
4	2 July	(Portugal) Portimão	(Australia) Senna Agius	(Spain) Roberto García	(Australia) Senna Agius	(Germany) Kalex	
5	16 July	(Spain) Barcelona	(Andorra) Xavier Cardelús	(Spain) Unai Orradre	(Andorra) Xavier Cardelús	(Germany) Kalex	
5	16 July	(Spain) Barcelona	(Andorra) Xavier Cardelús	(Spain) Yeray Ruiz	(Spain) Unai Orradre	(Germany) Kalex	
6	8 October	(Spain) Aragón	(Australia) Senna Agius	(Australia) Senna Agius	(Australia) Senna Agius	(Germany) Kalex	
6	8 October	(Spain) Aragón	(Australia) Senna Agius	(Australia) Senna Agius	(Australia) Senna Agius	(Germany) Kalex	
7	5 November	(Spain) Valencia	(Australia) Senna Agius	(Australia) Senna Agius	(Australia) Senna Agius	(Germany) Kalex	

== Entry list ==
Team	Constructor	No.	Rider	Rounds
(Spain) MMG - Pinamoto	Boscoscuro	38	Juan Rodríguez	1–3
(Italy) Team Ciatti - Boscoscuro	Boscoscuro	49	Francesco Mongiardo	All
(Italy) Team Ciatti - Boscoscuro	Boscoscuro	67	Alberto Surra	All
(Italy) Dodici Motorsport	Boscoscuro	51	Angelo Tagliarini	2
(Spain) Finetwork Team	Boscoscuro	54	Alberto Ferrández	6–7
(Spain) EasyRace Team	Boscoscuro	55	(Spain) Álex Toledo	1–6
(Spain) EasyRace Team	Boscoscuro	75	(Portugal) Ivo Lopes	7
(Spain) Fifty Motorsport	Kalex	4	Martin Vugrinec	1, 3
(Italy) Team MMR	Kalex	6	Jacopo Hosciuc	6–7
(Italy) Team MMR	Kalex	23	Niccolò Antonelli	1–6
(Italy) Team MMR	Kalex	27	Max Toth	1–5
(Italy) Team MMR	Kalex	77	Mattia Volpi	All
Yamaha Philippines Stylobike Racing	Kalex	8	Marco Tapia	All
Yamaha Philippines Stylobike Racing	Kalex	29	Harrison Voight	All
Yamaha Philippines Stylobike Racing	Kalex	32	McKinley Kyle Paz	All
(France) JEG Racing	Kalex	9	Charles Aubrie	All
(Spain) STV Laglisse Racing	Kalex	11	Unai Orradre	All
(Spain) STV Laglisse Racing	Kalex	21	Eduardo Montero	All
(Spain) AGR Team	Kalex	13	Mattia Rato	All
(Spain) AGR Team	Kalex	35	Sam Wilford	All
(Spain) Promoracing	Kalex	18	Xavier Cardelús	All
(Spain) Promoracing	Kalex	87	Gerard Riu	All
(Spain) Cardoso - Fantic Racing	Kalex	12	Borja Gómez	6-7
(Spain) Cardoso - Fantic Racing	Kalex	31	Roberto García	All
(Spain) Cardoso - Fantic Racing	Kalex	33	Filip Rehacek	All
(Spain) Fau55 Tey Racing (Spain) Fau55 Euvic Racing	Kalex	72	Yeray Ruiz	All
(Spain) Fau55 Tey Racing (Spain) Fau55 Euvic Racing	Kalex	74	Piotr Biesiekirski	1, 3–7
(Japan) Idemitsu Honda Team Asia	Kalex	79	(Japan) Ai Ogura	2
(Germany) Liqui Moly Husqvarna Intact GP Junior Team	Kalex	81	Senna Agius	All
(Spain) SF Racing	Kalex	98	Chanon Inta	All
(Indonesia) Pertamina Mandalika SAG Team	Kalex	99	(Spain) Carlos Tatay	1–4
(Spain) Fifty Motorsport	Kalex-Triumph	41	(Spain) Marc Garcia	2
(Netherlands) NTS-MMR Racing	NTS-Triumph	14	Héctor Garzó	2,7
Entry lists:

== Championship standings ==
Scoring system

Points were awarded to the top fifteen finishers. A rider had to finish the race to earn points.

Position	1st	2nd	3rd	4th	5th	6th	7th	8th	9th	10th	11th	12th	13th	14th	15th
Points	25	20	16	13	11	10	9	8	7	6	5	4	3	2	1

=== Riders' championship ===
Pos.	Rider	Bike	EST (Portugal)		VAL (Spain)	JER (Spain)	POR (Portugal)		CAT (Spain)		ARA (Spain)		VAL (Spain)	Points
1	(Australia) Senna Agius	Kalex	1^{PF}	1^{PF}	1^{PF}	3	1^{PF}	1^{P}			1^{PF}	1^{PF}	1^{PF}	216
2	(Andorra) Xavier Cardelús	Kalex	13	2	6	5	3	2	1^{P}	3^{P}	6	8	6	149
3	(Italy) Alberto Surra	Boscoscuro	4	7	Ret	7	2	5	3	2	18	2	2	138
4	(Italy) Mattia Rato	Kalex	5	4	2	4	6	8	6	4	12	11	10	113
5	(Spain) Roberto García	Kalex	Ret	Ret	4	6	5	3^{F}	4	Ret	2	5	4	107
6	(Spain) Unai Orradre	Kalex	12	Ret	15	8	15	Ret	2^{F}	1	4	6	3	98
7	(Spain) Yeray Ruiz	Kalex	6	5	5	2	9	10	5	Ret^{F}	Ret	7	5	96
8	(Spain) Álex Toledo	Boscoscuro	7	6	10	9	8	9	10	5	10	Ret		70
9	(Spain) Carlos Tatay	Kalex	2	Ret	3	1^{PF}	Ret	DNS						61
10	(Spain) Marco Tapia	Kalex	11	DNS	9	11	4	4	Ret	9	13	12	13	60
11	(Italy) Niccolò Antonelli	Kalex	8	3	8	Ret	7	Ret	Ret	Ret	7	Ret		50
12	(Italy) Francesco Mongiardo	Boscoscuro	18	Ret	12	10	13	Ret	7	11	8	9	8	50
13	(United Kingdom) Sam Wilford	Kalex	10	8	11	12	11	7	8	Ret	15	Ret	12	50
14	(Italy) Mattia Volpi	Kalex	14	10	Ret	15	10	11	12	10	9	10	Ret	43
15	(Poland) Piotr Biesiekirski	Kalex	WD	WD		14	Ret	6	9	7	Ret	Ret	7	37
16	(Spain) Gerard Riu	Kalex	19	13	13	13	12	12	11	8	14	15	Ret	33
17	(Spain) Borja Gómez	Kalex									3	3	DNS	32
18	(Australia) Harrison Voight	Kalex	3	Ret	Ret	Ret	Ret	Ret	13	6	Ret	13	Ret	32
19	(Spain) Alberto Ferrández	Boscoscuro									5	4	9	31
20	(Spain) Juan Rodríguez	Boscoscuro	9	9	7	Ret								23
21	(Philippines) McKinley Kyle Paz	Kalex	15	11	14	Ret	14	14	14	12	Ret	Ret	14	20
22	(Romania) Jacopo Hosciuc	Kalex									11	14	DNS	7
23	(Portugal) Ivo Lopes	Boscoscuro											11	5
24	(Croatia) Martin Vugrinec	Kalex	Ret	12		WD								4
25	(Czech Republic) Filip Rehacek	Kalex	16	Ret	16	16	17	16	16	13	17	17	15	4
26	(United States) Max Toth	Kalex	Ret	Ret	Ret	Ret	16	13	15	Ret				4
27	(Thailand) Chanon Inta	Kalex	17	14	18	Ret	18	18	Ret	15	19	18	Ret	3
28	(France) Charles Aubrie	Kalex	DNQ	DNQ	19	DNQ	19	17	17	14	Ret	Ret	DNQ	2
29	(Spain) Eduardo Montero	Kalex	Ret	Ret	WD	DNS	20	15	Ret	Ret	16	16	DSQ	1
30	(Spain) Marc Garcia	Kalex-Triumph			17									0
	(Spain) Héctor Garzó	NTS-Triumph			DNS								DNS	0
	(Italy) Angelo Tagliarini	Boscoscuro	WD	WD	DNS									0
	(Japan) Ai Ogura	Kalex			DNS									0
Pos.	Rider	Bike	EST (Portugal)		VAL (Spain)	JER (Spain)	POR (Portugal)		CAT (Spain)		ARA (Spain)		VAL (Spain)	Points

Colour	Result
Gold	Winner
Silver	Second place
Bronze	Third place
Green	Points classification
Blue	Non-points classification
Blue	Non-classified finish (NC)
Purple	Retired, not classified (Ret)
Red	Did not qualify (DNQ)
Red	Did not pre-qualify (DNPQ)
Black	Disqualified (DSQ)
White	Did not start (DNS)
White	Withdrew (WD)
White	Race cancelled (C)
Blank	Did not practice (DNP)
Blank	Did not arrive (DNA)
Blank	Excluded (EX)

P – Pole position
F – Fastest lap

=== Constructors' championship ===
Pos.	Constructor	EST (Portugal)		VAL (Spain)	JER (Spain)	POR (Portugal)		CAT (Spain)		ARA (Spain)		VAL (Spain)	Points
1	(Germany) Kalex	1	1	1	1	1	1	1	1	1	1	1	275
2	(Italy) Boscoscuro	4	6	10	7	2	5	3	2	5	2	2	156
	(United Kingdom) Kalex-Triumph			17									0
	(Netherlands) NTS-Triumph			DNS								DNS	0
Pos.	Constructor	EST (Portugal)		VAL (Spain)	JER (Spain)	POR (Portugal)		CAT (Spain)		ARA (Spain)		VAL (Spain)	Points
