= 2022 FIM Moto2 European Championship =

2022 FIM Moto2 European Championship
Previous:	2021	Next:	2023
Support series: FIM JuniorGP World Championship; European Talent Cup

The 2022 FIM Moto2 European Championship is the first season after leaving the historical connection to CEV and the seventh under the FIM banner.

== Calendar ==
The calendar was published in November 2021.

Round	Date	Circuit	Pole position	Fastest lap	Race winner	Winning constructor	STK 600 winner
1	8 May	(Portugal) Estoril	(Germany) Lukas Tulovic	(Germany) Lukas Tulovic	(Germany) Lukas Tulovic	(Germany) Kalex	(Spain) Álex Ruiz
1	8 May	(Portugal) Estoril	(Germany) Lukas Tulovic	(Germany) Lukas Tulovic	(Germany) Lukas Tulovic	(Germany) Kalex	(Spain) Álex Ruiz
2	22 May	(Spain) Valencia	(Germany) Lukas Tulovic	(Germany) Lukas Tulovic	(Germany) Lukas Tulovic	(Germany) Kalex	(Spain) Marco Tapia
3	12 June	(Spain) Barcelona	(Germany) Lukas Tulovic	(Australia) Senna Agius	(Australia) Senna Agius	(Germany) Kalex	(Spain) Eric Fernández
3	12 June	(Spain) Barcelona	(Germany) Lukas Tulovic	(Australia) Senna Agius	(Australia) Senna Agius	(Germany) Kalex	(Spain) Eric Fernández
4	3 July	(Spain) Jerez	(Germany) Lukas Tulovic	(Spain) Álex Escrig	(Spain) Álex Escrig	(Germany) Kalex	(Spain) Juan Rodríguez
5	17 July	(Portugal) Portimão	(Germany) Lukas Tulovic	(Germany) Lukas Tulovic	(Spain) Álex Escrig	(Germany) Kalex	(Spain) Dani Muñoz
5	17 July	(Portugal) Portimão	(Germany) Lukas Tulovic	(Australia) Senna Agius	(Germany) Lukas Tulovic	(Germany) Kalex	(Spain) Dani Muñoz
6	9 October	(Spain) Aragón	(Germany) Lukas Tulovic	(Germany) Lukas Tulovic	(Germany) Lukas Tulovic	(Germany) Kalex	(Spain) Dani Muñoz
6	9 October	(Spain) Aragón	(Germany) Lukas Tulovic	(Germany) Lukas Tulovic	(Germany) Lukas Tulovic	(Germany) Kalex	(Spain) Juan Rodríguez
7	30 October	(Spain) Valencia	(Australia) Senna Agius	(Germany) Lukas Tulovic	(Germany) Lukas Tulovic	(Germany) Kalex	(Spain) Dani Muñoz

== Entry list ==
Team	Constructor	No.	Rider	Rounds
Moto2
(Spain) Avintia Junior Team	Kalex	2	(Spain) Marc Alcoba	3–4
(Spain) Avintia Junior Team	Kalex	44	(Germany) Kevin Orgis	5–6
(Germany) Liqui Moly Intact GP Junior Team	Kalex	3	(Germany) Lukas Tulovic	All
(Switzerland) MV Agusta Forward Junior Team	MV Agusta	4	(Spain) Héctor Garzó	1–5
(Switzerland) MV Agusta Forward Junior Team	MV Agusta	56	(Italy) Nicola Gianico	1–2, 4–5
(Switzerland) MV Agusta Forward Junior Team	MV Agusta	89	(Spain) David Sanchís	3, 6
(Italy) Team MMR	Kalex	4	(Spain) Héctor Garzó	7–11
(Italy) Team MMR	Kalex	10	(Italy) Tommaso Marcon	1–6
(Italy) Team MMR	Kalex	13	(Italy) Mattia Rato	1–6
(Italy) Team MMR	Kalex	27	(United States) Maxwell Toth	7
(France) JEG Racing	Kalex	9	(France) Charles Aubrie	All
Yamaha Philippines Stylobike Racing	Kalex	11	(Spain) Álex Escrig	1–5, 7
Yamaha Philippines Stylobike Racing	Kalex	32	(Philippines) McKinley Kyle Paz	All
Yamaha Philippines Stylobike Racing	Kalex	56	(Italy) Nicola Gianico	6
(Spain) Cardoso Racing	Kalex	15	(Spain) Borja Gómez	7
(Spain) Cardoso Racing	Kalex	31	(Spain) Roberto García	All
(Spain) Fifty Motorsport	Kalex	16	(United Kingdom) Jamie Davis	All
(Spain) Promoracing	Kalex	18	(Andorra) Xavier Cardelús	1–2, 4–6
(Spain) Promoracing	Kalex	81	(Australia) Senna Agius	All
(Germany) Moonpharm Kiefer Racing	KTM	23	(Spain) Eduardo Montero	All
(Spain) AGR Team	Kalex	35	(United Kingdom) Sam Wilford	1, 6–7
(Spain) AGR Team	Kalex	77	(Italy) Mattia Volpi	5–7
(United Kingdom) Vision Track Racing Team	Spirit	37	(United Kingdom) Corey Tinker	1–4
(Italy) Dodici Motorsport Racing Team	Boscoscuro	51	(Italy) Angelo Tagliarini	All
(Indonesia) Pertamina Mandalika SAG Euvic	Kalex	55	(Spain) Álex Toledo	All
(Indonesia) Pertamina Mandalika SAG Euvic	Kalex	74	(Poland) Piotr Biesiekirski	All
(Spain) H43 Team Nobby	Brevo	71	(Spain) Miquel Pons	1–3, 6–7
(Spain) Fau55 Tey Racing	Kalex	72	(Spain) Yeray Ruiz	All
Superstock 600
(Spain) Avintia Junior Team	Yamaha	6	(Romania) Jacopo Hosciuc	1–3, 5–7
(Spain) Avintia Junior Team	Yamaha	44	(Germany) Kevin Orgis	1–4
(Spain) Avintia Junior Team	Yamaha	75	(France) Martin Renaudin	7
(Spain) Avintia Junior Team	Yamaha	91	(Bulgaria) Mihail Florov	1–4, 6
(Spain) EasyRace Team	Yamaha	7	(United States) Zechariah Kwame Dzegede	All
(Spain) EasyRace Team	Yamaha	8	(Spain) Marco Tapia	All
(Spain) EasyRace Team	Yamaha	37	(United Kingdom) Corey Tinker	6–7
(Spain) Fau55 Tey Racing	Yamaha	12	(Spain) Álex Ruiz	All
(Spain) Fau55 Tey Racing	Yamaha	86	(Italy) Kylian Nestola	1–2, 4–7
(Spain) Fau55 Tey Racing	Yamaha	90	(Germany) Freddie Heinrich	4–7
(Spain) Fifty Motorsport	Yamaha	17	(Spain) Daniel Muñoz	5–6
(Netherlands) Qnium Racing	Yamaha	19	(Netherlands) Ryan van de Lagemaat	All
(United Kingdom) Vision Track Racing Team	Yamaha	25	(United Kingdom) Thomas Strudwick	All
(United Kingdom) Vision Track Racing Team	Yamaha	37	(United Kingdom) Corey Tinker	5
(Spain) Cardoso Racing	Yamaha	30	(Italy) Pasquale Alfano	4–7
(Spain) Cardoso Racing	Yamaha	33	(Czech Republic) Filip Rehacek	1–2, 6–7
(Spain) Cuna de Campeones	Yamaha	38	(Spain) Juan Rodríguez	All
(Portugal) MS Racing Junior	Yamaha	70	(Portugal) Miguel Santiago Duarte	1–4, 6–7
(Spain) IUM Motorsport	Yamaha	73	(Italy) Dino Iozzo	1–3, 5–7
(Spain) H43 Team Nobby	Yamaha	88	(Germany) Nicolas Chris Czyba	All
(Spain) Yamaha GV Stratos	Yamaha	91	(Bulgaria) Mihail Florov	7
(Spain) Team Speed Racing	Kawasaki	78	(Spain) Eric Fernández	3

== Championship standings ==
Scoring system

Points were awarded to the top fifteen finishers. A rider had to finish the race to earn points.

Position	1st	2nd	3rd	4th	5th	6th	7th	8th	9th	10th	11th	12th	13th	14th	15th
Points	25	20	16	13	11	10	9	8	7	6	5	4	3	2	1

=== Riders' championship ===
Pos.	Rider	Bike	EST (Portugal)		VAL (Spain)	CAT (Spain)		JER (Spain)	POR (Portugal)		ARA (Spain)		VAL (Spain)	Points
Moto2
1	(Germany) Lukas Tulovic	Kalex	1^{PF}	1^{PF}	1^{PF}	2^{P}	2^{P}	2^{P}	2^{PF}	1^{P}	1^{PF}	1^{PF}	1^{F}	255
2	(Australia) Senna Agius	Kalex	2	2	Ret	1^{F}	1^{F}	3	Ret	2^{F}	2	2	3^{P}	182
3	(Spain) Álex Escrig	Kalex	3	7	2	3	4	1^{F}	1	3			2	160
4	(Spain) Álex Toledo	Kalex	4	4	5	4	3	5	5	8	6	5	8	125
5	(Andorra) Xavier Cardelús	Kalex	Ret	5	3			4	3	4	3	3	4	114
6	(Spain) Yeray Ruiz	Kalex	13	10	4	7	19	6	7	6	4	4	9	92
7	(Spain) Roberto García	Kalex	Ret	6	Ret	5	11	7	4	5	5	Ret	6	80
8	(Italy) Mattia Rato	Kalex	6	3	7	6	10	Ret	14	10	9	6		76
9	(Poland) Piotr Biesiekirski	Kalex	Ret	DNS	8	Ret	7	9	6	7	10	9	10	62
10	(Spain) Eduardo Montero	KTM	9	9	Ret	11	12	10	9	11	11	10	Ret	52
11	(Spain) Héctor Garzó	MV Agusta	Ret	25	DNS	10	8	8	7	Ret				42
11	(Spain) Héctor Garzó	Kalex											5	42
12	(Philippines) McKinley Kyle Paz	Kalex	12	8	12	13	13	13	20	14	14	Ret	11	34
13	(Italy) Tommaso Marcon	Kalex	DNS	DNS	6	Ret	Ret	Ret	13	9	7	DNS		29
14	(Spain) David Sanchís	MV Agusta				9	9				12	8		26
15	(Spain) Marco Tapia	Yamaha	14	15	10	15	16	12	11	15	18	13	15	24
16	(United Kingdom) Sam Wilford	Kalex	5	Ret							13	7	Ret	23
17	(Spain) Álex Ruiz	Yamaha	7	12	11	16	17	14	19	16	19	14	Ret	22
18	(Spain) Juan Rodríguez	Yamaha	Ret	DNS	Ret	14	15	11	12	13	16	11	Ret	20
19	(Spain) Daniel Muñoz	Yamaha							10	12	15	12	12	19
20	(Spain) Miquel Pons	Brevo	DNS	DNS	9	DSQ	5				Ret	Ret	Ret	18
21	(Spain) Marc Alcoba	Kalex				8	6	Ret						18
22	(Italy) Angelo Tagliarini	Boscoscuro	8	11	Ret	Ret	DNS	Ret	22	19	DNQ	DNQ		13
23	(Italy) Dino Iozzo	Yamaha	10	Ret	14	17	18		16	Ret	21	18	14	10
24	(Germany) Nicolas Chris Czyba	Yamaha	11	13	15	22	Ret	15	Ret	DNS	23	19	18	10
25	(Spain) Borja Gómez	Kalex											7	9
26	(Italy) Mattia Volpi	Kalex							15	Ret	8	Ret	Ret	9
27	(Spain) Eric Fernández	Kawasaki				12	14							6
28	(Germany) Kevin Orgis	Yamaha	15	Ret	13	DNS	27	16						4
28	(Germany) Kevin Orgis	Kalex							Ret	DNS	17	16		4
29	(Italy) Pasquale Alfano	Yamaha						18	17	Ret	22	17	13	3
30	(Netherlands) Ryan van de Lagemaat	Yamaha	17	14	17	18	20	17	25	23	30	23	21	2
31	(United Kingdom) Jamie Davis	Kalex	20	19	DNS	24	24	Ret	Ret	DNS	20	15	Ret	1
Superstock 600
1	(Spain) Marco Tapia	Yamaha	4	4	1	3	3	2	2	3	3	3	4	184
2	(Spain) Álex Ruiz	Yamaha	1	1	2	4	4	3	7	4	4	4	Ret	160
3	(Spain) Juan Rodríguez	Yamaha	Ret	Ret	Ret	2	2	1	3	2	2	1	Ret	146
4	(Spain) Daniel Muñoz	Yamaha							1	1	1	2	1	120
5	(Italy) Dino Iozzo	Yamaha	2	12	4	5	5		4	Ret	5	6	3	109
6	(Germany) Nicolas Chris Czyba	Yamaha	3	2	5	9	Ret	4	Ret	DNS	7	7	7	94
7	(Netherlands) Ryan van de Lagemaat	Yamaha	7	3	7	6	6	6	10	8	13	10	10	93
8	(United Kingdom) Thomas Strudwick	Yamaha	6	5	9	8	7	8	8	6				71
9	(Romania) Jacopo Hosciuc	Yamaha	9	7	10	Ret	8		Ret	5	10	9	6	64
10	(Italy) Pasquale Alfano	Yamaha						7	5	Ret	6	5	2	61
11	(Italy) Kylian Nestola	Yamaha	11	9	8			10	9	7	11	11	Ret	57
12	(Spain) Eric Fernández	Kawasaki				1	1							50
13	(Bulgaria) Mihail Florov	Yamaha	8	6	Ret	7	9	Ret			Ret	Ret	5	45
14	(Germany) Kevin Orgis	Yamaha	5	DNS	3	DNS	10	5						44
15	(Germany) Freddie Heinrich	Yamaha						9	6	9	8	8	11	44
16	(Czech Republic) Filip Rehacek	Yamaha	10	8	6						12	Ret	8	36
17	(United States) Zech Dzegede	Yamaha	12	10	DNQ	10	11	11	DNQ	DNQ	DNQ	DNQ	DNQ	26
18	(United Kingdom) Corey Tinker	Yamaha									9	12	Ret	11
19	(France) Martin Renaudin	Yamaha											9	7
20	(Portugal) Miguel Santiago Duarte	Yamaha	DNS	11	DNQ	DNQ	DNQ	DNQ			DNQ	DNQ	DNQ	5
Pos.	Rider	Bike	EST (Portugal)		VAL (Spain)	CAT (Spain)		JER (Spain)	POR (Portugal)		ARA (Spain)		VAL (Spain)	Points

Colour	Result
Gold	Winner
Silver	Second place
Bronze	Third place
Green	Points classification
Blue	Non-points classification
Blue	Non-classified finish (NC)
Purple	Retired, not classified (Ret)
Red	Did not qualify (DNQ)
Red	Did not pre-qualify (DNPQ)
Black	Disqualified (DSQ)
White	Did not start (DNS)
White	Withdrew (WD)
White	Race cancelled (C)
Blank	Did not practice (DNP)
Blank	Did not arrive (DNA)
Blank	Excluded (EX)

P – Pole position
F – Fastest lap

=== Constructors' championship ===
Pos.	Constructor	EST (Portugal)		VAL (Spain)	CAT (Spain)		JER (Spain)	POR (Portugal)		ARA (Spain)		VAL (Spain)	Points
Moto2
1	(Germany) Kalex	1	1	1	1	1	1	1	1	1	1	1	275
2	(Austria) KTM	9	9	Ret	11	12	10	9	11	11	10	Ret	52
3	(Italy) MV Agusta	Ret	25	DNS	9	8	8	7	Ret	12	8		44
4	(Italy) Brevo	DNS	DNS	9	DSQ	5				Ret	Ret	Ret	18
5	(Italy) Boscoscuro	8	11	Ret	Ret	DNS	Ret	22	19	DNS	DNS		13
Superstock 600
1	(Japan) Yamaha	1	1	1	2	2	1	1	1	1	1	1	265
2	(Japan) Kawasaki				1	1							50
Pos.	Constructor	EST (Portugal)		VAL (Spain)	CAT (Spain)		JER (Spain)	POR (Portugal)		ARA (Spain)		VAL (Spain)	Points
