= 2025 Catalan motorcycle Grand Prix =

Motorcycle races in Montmeló

(Catalonia) 2025 Catalan Grand Prix
Race details
- Race 15 of 22 races in the 2025 Grand Prix motorcycle racing season
- Date: 7 September 2025
- Official name: Monster Energy Grand Prix of Catalonia
- Location: Circuit de Barcelona-Catalunya; Montmeló, Spain
- Course: Permanent racing facility; 4.657 km (2.894 mi)

MotoGP
Pole position
Rider	(Spain) Álex Márquez	Ducati
Time	1:37.536	
Fastest lap
Rider	(Spain) Álex Márquez	Ducati
Time	1:39.886 on lap 7	
Podium
First	(Spain) Álex Márquez	Ducati
Second	(Spain) Marc Márquez	Ducati
Third	(Italy) Enea Bastianini	KTM

Moto2
Pole position
Rider	(Spain) Daniel Holgado	Kalex
Time	1:41.549	
Fastest lap
Rider	(Spain) Daniel Muñoz	Kalex
Time	1:42.355 on lap 3	
Podium
First	(Spain) Daniel Holgado	Kalex
Second	(United Kingdom) Jake Dixon	Boscoscuro
Third	(Spain) Daniel Muñoz	Kalex

Moto3
Pole position
Rider	(Spain) David Almansa	Honda
Time	1:46.877	
Fastest lap
Rider	(Japan) Taiyo Furusato	Honda
Time	1:47.873 on lap 15	
Podium
First	(Spain) Ángel Piqueras	KTM
Second	(Spain) José Antonio Rueda	KTM
Third	(Japan) Taiyo Furusato	Honda

MotoE Race 1
Pole position
Rider	(Brazil) Eric Granado	Ducati
Time	1:47.575	
Fastest lap
Rider	(Italy) Nicholas Spinelli	Ducati
Time	1:47.734 on lap 3	
Podium
First	(Brazil) Eric Granado	Ducati
Second	(Italy) Lorenzo Baldassarri	Ducati
Third	(Italy) Matteo Ferrari	Ducati

MotoE Race 2
Pole position
Rider	(Brazil) Eric Granado	Ducati
Time	1:47.575	
Fastest lap
Rider	(Brazil) Eric Granado	Ducati
Time	1:47.917 on lap 3	
Podium
First	(Brazil) Eric Granado	Ducati
Second	(Italy) Nicholas Spinelli	Ducati
Third	(Italy) Mattia Casadei	Ducati

The 2025 Catalan motorcycle Grand Prix (officially known as the Monster Energy Grand Prix of Catalonia) was the fifteenth round of the 2025 Grand Prix motorcycle racing season and the fifth round of the 2025 MotoE World Championship. All races (except for both MotoE races which were held on 6 September) were held at the Circuit de Barcelona-Catalunya in Montmeló on 7 September 2025.

After Marc Márquez's win in the MotoGP sprint, Ducati secured its sixth consecutive and seventh overall Constructors' Championship in the MotoGP class.

In the Moto3 class, KTM won their seventh Constructor's title after Ángel Piqueras's win.

== MotoGP Sprint ==
The MotoGP Sprint was held on 6 September 2025.

Pos.	No.	Rider	Team	Manufacturer	Laps	Time/Retired	Grid	Points
1	93	(Spain) Marc Márquez	Ducati Lenovo Team	Ducati	12	19:58.946	3	12
2	20	(France) Fabio Quartararo	Monster Energy Yamaha MotoGP Team	Yamaha	12	+1.299	2	9
3	49	(Italy) Fabio Di Giannantonio	Pertamina Enduro VR46 Racing Team	Ducati	12	+3.653	6	7
4	37	(Spain) Pedro Acosta	Red Bull KTM Factory Racing	KTM	12	+5.868	5	6
5	23	(Italy) Enea Bastianini	Red Bull KTM Tech3	KTM	12	+5.913	9	5
6	33	(South Africa) Brad Binder	Red Bull KTM Factory Racing	KTM	12	+5.943	11	4
7	5	(France) Johann Zarco	LCR Honda Castrol	Honda	12	+7.017	7	3
8	10	(Italy) Luca Marini	Honda HRC Castrol	Honda	12	+7.346	10	2
9	79	(Japan) Ai Ogura	Trackhouse MotoGP Team	Aprilia	12	+8.488	8	1
10	88	(Portugal) Miguel Oliveira	Prima Pramac Yamaha MotoGP	Yamaha	12	+8.578	16	
11	25	(Spain) Raúl Fernández	Trackhouse MotoGP Team	Aprilia	12	+9.788	15	
12	43	(Australia) Jack Miller	Prima Pramac Yamaha MotoGP	Yamaha	12	+10.165	14	
13	36	(Spain) Joan Mir	Honda HRC Castrol	Honda	12	+11.593	17	
14	63	(Italy) Francesco Bagnaia	Ducati Lenovo Team	Ducati	12	+14.463	21	
15	42	(Spain) Álex Rins	Monster Energy Yamaha MotoGP Team	Yamaha	12	+15.936	20	
16	41	(Spain) Aleix Espargaró	Honda HRC Test Team	Honda	12	+16.909	19	
17	12	(Spain) Maverick Viñales	Red Bull KTM Tech3	KTM	12	+17.040	22	
18	35	(Thailand) Somkiat Chantra	IDEMITSU Honda LCR	Honda	12	+22.439	24	
Ret	73	(Spain) Álex Márquez	BK8 Gresini Racing MotoGP	Ducati	8	Accident	1	
Ret	54	(Spain) Fermín Aldeguer	BK8 Gresini Racing MotoGP	Ducati	7	Collision	13	
Ret	72	(Italy) Marco Bezzecchi	Aprilia Racing	Aprilia	7	Collision	12	
Ret	21	(Italy) Franco Morbidelli	Pertamina Enduro VR46 Racing Team	Ducati	6	Collision	4	
Ret	1	(Spain) Jorge Martín	Aprilia Racing	Aprilia	6	Collision	18	
Ret	32	(Italy) Lorenzo Savadori	Aprilia Racing	Aprilia	6	Technical issue	23	
Fastest sprint lap: (Spain) Marc Márquez (Ducati) – 1:38.592 (lap 2)
OFFICIAL MOTOGP SPRINT REPORT

== Race ==
=== MotoGP ===
Pos.	No.	Rider	Team	Manufacturer	Laps	Time/Retired	Grid	Points
1	73	(Spain) Álex Márquez	BK8 Gresini Racing MotoGP	Ducati	24	40:14.093	1	25
2	93	(Spain) Marc Márquez	Ducati Lenovo Team	Ducati	24	+1.740	3	20
3	23	(Italy) Enea Bastianini	Red Bull KTM Tech3	KTM	24	+5.562	9	16
4	37	(Spain) Pedro Acosta	Red Bull KTM Factory Racing	KTM	24	+13.373	5	13
5	20	(France) Fabio Quartararo	Monster Energy Yamaha MotoGP Team	Yamaha	24	+14.409	2	11
6	79	(Japan) Ai Ogura	Trackhouse MotoGP Team	Aprilia	24	+15.055	8	10
7	63	(Italy) Francesco Bagnaia	Ducati Lenovo Team	Ducati	24	+16.048	21	9
8	10	(Italy) Luca Marini	Honda HRC Castrol	Honda	24	+16.372	10	8
9	88	(Portugal) Miguel Oliveira	Prima Pramac Yamaha MotoGP	Yamaha	24	+16.937	16	7
10	1	(Spain) Jorge Martín	Aprilia Racing	Aprilia	24	+18.492	17	6
11	25	(Spain) Raúl Fernández	Trackhouse MotoGP Team	Aprilia	24	+19.489	15	5
12	36	(Spain) Joan Mir	Honda HRC Castrol	Honda	24	+20.159	20 (Note: 3-place grid penalty due to impeding riders in qualifying)	4
13	12	(Spain) Maverick Viñales	Red Bull KTM Tech3	KTM	24	+22.792	22	3
14	43	(Australia) Jack Miller	Prima Pramac Yamaha MotoGP	Yamaha	24	+24.351	14	2
15	54	(Spain) Fermín Aldeguer	BK8 Gresini Racing MotoGP	Ducati	24	+24.592	13	1
16	35	(Thailand) Somkiat Chantra	IDEMITSU Honda LCR	Honda	24	+37.393	24	
17	41	(Spain) Aleix Espargaró	Honda HRC Test Team	Honda	24	+43.202	18	
Ret	21	(Italy) Franco Morbidelli	Pertamina Enduro VR46 Racing Team	Ducati	21	Accident damage	4	
Ret	32	(Italy) Lorenzo Savadori	Aprilia Racing	Aprilia	19	Crashed out	23	
Ret	42	(Spain) Álex Rins	Monster Energy Yamaha MotoGP Team	Yamaha	14	Crashed out	19	
Ret	49	(Italy) Fabio Di Giannantonio	Pertamina Enduro VR46 Racing Team	Ducati	12	Accident damage	6	
Ret	5	(France) Johann Zarco	LCR Honda Castrol	Honda	10	Crashed out	7	
Ret	33	(South Africa) Brad Binder	Red Bull KTM Factory Racing	KTM	6	Crashed out	11	
Ret	72	(Italy) Marco Bezzecchi	Aprilia Racing	Aprilia	1	Crashed out	12	
Fastest lap: (Spain) Álex Márquez (Ducati) – 1:39.886 (lap 7)
OFFICIAL MOTOGP RACE REPORT

== Championship standings after the race ==
Below are the standings for the top five riders, constructors, and teams after the round.

=== MotoGP ===
Riders' Championship standings

Pos.	Rider	Points
1	(Spain) Marc Márquez	487
2	(Spain) Álex Márquez	305
3	(Italy) Francesco Bagnaia	237
4	(Italy) Marco Bezzecchi	197
5	(Spain) Pedro Acosta	183

Constructors' Championship standings

Pos.	Constructor	Points
1	(Italy) Ducati	541
2	(Italy) Aprilia	239
3	(Austria) KTM	237
4	(Japan) Honda	186
5	(Japan) Yamaha	160

Teams' Championship standings

Pos.	Team	Points
1	(Italy) Ducati Lenovo Team	724
2	(Italy) BK8 Gresini Racing MotoGP	432
3	(Italy) Pertamina Enduro VR46 Racing Team	322
4	(Austria) Red Bull KTM Factory Racing	278
5	(Italy) Aprilia Racing	234

=== Moto2 ===
Riders' Championship standings

Pos.	Rider	Points
1	(Spain) Manuel González	217
2	(Spain) Arón Canet	179
3	(Brazil) Diogo Moreira	175
4	(Belgium) Barry Baltus	153
5	(United Kingdom) Jake Dixon	152

Constructors' Championship standings

Pos.	Constructor	Points
1	(Germany) Kalex	358
2	(Italy) Boscoscuro	210
3	(Switzerland) Forward	13

Teams' Championship standings

	Pos.	Team	Points
	1	(Italy) Fantic Racing Lino Sonego	332
	2	(Germany) Liqui Moly Dynavolt Intact GP	310
	3	(Belgium) Elf Marc VDS Racing Team	231
	4	(Italy) Italtrans Racing Team	191
2	5	(Spain) CFMoto Impulse Aspar Team	188

=== Moto3 ===
Riders' Championship standings

Pos.	Rider	Points
1	(Spain) José Antonio Rueda	270
2	(Spain) Ángel Piqueras	206
3	(Spain) Máximo Quiles	168
4	(Spain) David Muñoz	163
5	(Spain) Álvaro Carpe	149

Constructors' Championship standings

Pos.	Constructor	Points
1	(Austria) KTM	375
2	(Japan) Honda	185

Teams' Championship standings

	Pos.	Team	Points
	1	(Finland) Red Bull KTM Ajo	419
	2	(Spain) Frinsa – MT Helmets – MSi	303
	3	(Spain) CFMoto Gaviota Aspar Team	249
	4	(Germany) Liqui Moly Dynavolt Intact GP	224
1	5	(Luxembourg) Leopard Racing	201

=== MotoE ===
Riders' Championship standings

	Pos.	Rider	Points
	1	(Italy) Mattia Casadei	132
	2	(Italy) Lorenzo Baldassarri	132
1	3	(Italy) Alessandro Zaccone	122
2	4	(Italy) Nicholas Spinelli	114
	5	(Italy) Matteo Ferrari	112

Teams' Championship standings

	Pos.	Team	Points
1	1	(Monaco) LCR E-Team	241
1	2	(Germany) Dynavolt Intact GP	224
	3	(Spain) Power Electronics Aspar Team	165
3	4	(Italy) Rivacold Snipers Team MotoE	160
1	5	(Italy) Aruba Cloud MotoE Team	153

== Notes ==
Previous race: 2025 Hungarian Grand Prix	FIM Grand Prix World Championship; 2025 season	Next race: 2025 San Marino Grand Prix
Previous race: 2024 Catalan Grand Prix	Catalan motorcycle Grand Prix	Next race: 2026 Catalan Grand Prix
