= Milan Pawelec =

Polish motorcycle racer (born 2007)

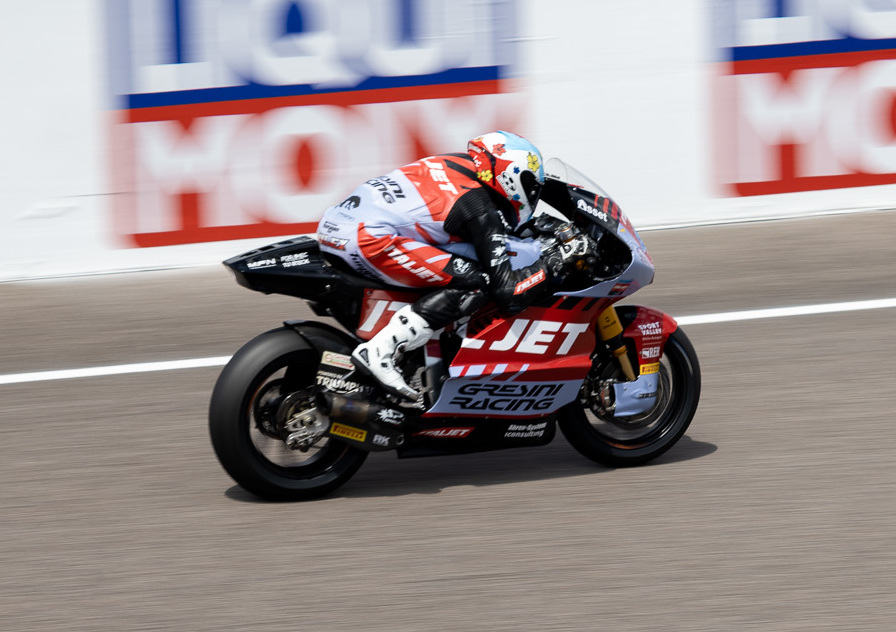
- Pawelec at the 2026 German Grand Prix
- Born: 4 April 2007 (age 19); Wolsztyn, Poland
- Nationality: Polish
- Current team: AGR Team
- Bike number: 44

Championship titles
- Moto2 European Championship (2025, 2026); Alpe Adria Superstock 1000 Championship (2023)
Statistics
Moto2 European Championship
Active years	2025–
Championships	2
Manufacturer	Kalex
Last season (2025)	1st (174 pts)
Starts / Wins / Podiums / Poles / F. laps / Points; 22 / 11 / 14 / 4 / 5 / 397
Moto2 World Championship
Active years	2025–
Championships	0
Manufacturer	Kalex
Starts / Wins / Podiums / Poles / F. laps / Points; 5 / 0 / 0 / 0 / 0 / 0

Milan Pawelec (born 4 April 2007) is a Polish motorcycle racer who competes in the Moto2 European Championship for AGR Team. He is a two-time Moto2 European Champion, having won the title consecutively in 2025 and 2026.

Pawelec has made Grand Prix appearances in the Moto2 World Championship in 2025 and 2026.

== Personal life ==
Born in Wolsztyn, Poland, Pawelec began his racing career at a young age on pocketbikes. His father Tomasz is a Polish Supersport Champion, and his uncle Andrzej, a six-time Polish Champion, having competed in the 2004 Superbike World Championship as a wildcard. His older brother Oleg is also a motorcycle racer.

== Career ==
=== European Talent Cup (2020–2021) ===
In 2020, Pawelec entered the European Talent Cup with the Polish Wójcik Racing Junior Team, alongside his brother Oleg. His best result was a 17th place at Jerez, followed by an 18th at Aragón, where he fought for top-ten places. After racing full-time in 2020, Pawelec only entered three rounds of the European Talent Cup in 2021. His opening race at Barcelona marked his best ever result with a 12th place finish, which would be improved at Aragon following a ninth place.

=== Alpe Adria Motorcycle Championship (2022–2023) ===
After two years in the European Talent Cup, Pawelec moved to higher displacement championships where he competed aboard Superstock 1000 motorcycles in the Alpe Adria championship, a competition he would end up winning in 2023, aged 16. After securing the championship, he entered the final round of the German IDM Superstock 1000 at the Hockenheimring, where he set pole position and won both races of the weekend.

=== Red Bull Rookies Cup and JuniorGP (2024) ===
Following his success in regional European championships, Pawelec was invited to the 2023 Red Bull MotoGP Rookies Cup selection event in Spain, where he was selected to compete in 2024. In December 2023, it was announced he would also be competing in the FIM JuniorGP World Championship for the 2024 season, racing for Laglisse. He had an inconsistent Rookies Cup campaign where he only scored points in two occasions, Aragon being his best result with a fourth place finish. Aboard a Husvqarna FR250GP, Pawelec clinched better results in the JuniorGP, finishing in the point section consistently and claiming his best result in the final round at Estoril, with an 11th place.

=== Moto2 European Championship (2025–) ===
Pawelec moved up to the Moto2 European Championship in 2025, following his 2024 campaign on Moto3 machines. Racing for AGR Team, he clinched pole position in the second round at Jerez and his first podium in the next race at Magny-Cours, after finishing second behind Alberto Ferrández. In the following round at Aragon, Pawelec clinched his maiden win in Race 2, which moved him up to third in the standings. Having clinched another podium and win at Misano and Barcelona, he faced the final round at Valencia in second place, ten points behind championship leader Unai Orradre. Pawelec secured first place in the race, while championship rival Orradre finished fifth, and was crowned Moto2 European champion in his rookie season.

In 2026, Pawelec remained with AGR Team in the Moto2 European Championship for a second season, as defending champion.

=== Moto2 World Championship (2025–) ===
Pawelec entered the Czech round of the 2025 Moto2 World Championship as a wildcard, with his European championship team AGR. During the race, Pawelec was running in 25th place when he was collected by another rider and was unable to finish his debut race in the World Championship.

In 2026, Pawelec was called for a Moto2 replacement at Brno, filling in for the unfit Alonso López with Gresini Racing. He made another replacement appearance in Motegi, deputising for an injured Collin Veijer at Red Bull KTM Ajo.

== Career statistics ==
=== European Talent Cup ===
==== Races by year ====
(key) (Races in bold indicate pole position; races in italics indicate fastest lap)

Year	Bike	1	2	3	4	5	6	7	8	9	10	11	12	Pos	Pts
2020	Honda	EST; 22	EST; 28	ALG; 32	JER; 23	JER; 22	JER; 17	ARA; 18	ARA; 19	ARA; 23	VAL; 30	VAL; 27		NC	0
2021	Honda	EST	EST	VAL	VAL	BAR; 12	ALG; DNQ	ARA; 9	ARA; C	JER	JER	VAL	VAL	24th	11

=== Alpe Adria Superstock 1000 ===
==== Races by year ====
(key) (Races in bold indicate pole position; races in italics indicate fastest lap)

Year	Bike	1		2		3		4		5		6		Pos	Pts
Year	Bike	R1	R2	R1	R2	R1	R2	R1	R2	R1	R2	R1	R2	Pos	Pts
2023	BMW	SLO; Ret	SLO; 2	PAN; 1	PAN; 1	BRN; 1	BRN; 1	GRO; 2	GRO; 1	SLO; 1	SLO; 1	GRO	GRO	1st	215

=== IDM Pro Superstock 1000 ===
==== Races by year ====
(key) (Races in bold indicate pole position; races in italics indicate fastest lap)

Year	Bike	1		2		3		4		5		Pos	Pts
Year	Bike	R1	R2	R1	R2	R1	R2	R1	R2	R1	R2	Pos	Pts
2023	BMW	OSC	OSC	MOS	MOS	SCH	SCH	ASS	ASS	**HOC**; 1	**HOC**; 1	NC (Note: Ineligible for points.)	-

=== Red Bull MotoGP Rookies Cup ===
==== Races by year ====
(key) (Races in bold indicate pole position; races in italics indicate fastest lap)

Year	Bike	1		2		3		4		5		6		7		Pos	Pts
Year	Bike	R1	R2	R1	R2	R1	R2	R1	R2	R1	R2	R1	R2	R1	R2	Pos	Pts
2024	KTM	JER; DNS	JER; DNS	LMS; Ret	LMS; Ret	MUG; 14	MUG; 17	ASS; 16	ASS; 17	RBR; 19	RBR; 20	ARA; DNS	ARA; 4	MIS; 22	MIS; 21	19th	15

=== FIM JuniorGP World Championship ===
==== Races by year ====
(key) (Races in bold indicate pole position; races in italics indicate fastest lap)

Year	Bike	1	2	3	4	5	6	7	8	9	10	11	12	Pos	Pts
2024	Husqvarna	MIS1; 13	MIS2; 13	EST	BAR1; 19	BAR2; 12	ALG1; 16	ALG2; 21	JER1; 15	JER2; 15	ARA; Ret	EST1; 11	EST2; Ret	20th	17

=== FIM Moto2 European Championship ===
==== Races by year ====
(key) (Races in bold indicate pole position, races in italics indicate fastest lap)

Year	Bike	1	2	3	4	5	6	7	8	9	10	11	Pos	Pts
2025	Kalex	EST1; 8	EST2; 4	**JER**; 4	MAG1; 2	MAG2; 8	ARA1; 8	ARA2; 1	MIS; 3	BAR1; 4	BAR2; 1	VAL; 1	1st	174
2026	Kalex	BAR2; 1	BAR2; 3	EST1; 1	EST2; 9	JER; 1	**MAG1**; 1	**MAG2**; 1	VAL; 1	**ARA1**; Ret	**ARA2**; 1	**MIS**; 1	1st	223

=== Grand Prix motorcycle racing ===
==== By season ====
Season	Class	Motorcycle	Team	Race	Win	Podium	Pole	FLap	Pts	Plcd
2025	Moto2	Kalex	AGR Team Fusport	1	0	0	0	0	0	NC
2026	Moto2	Kalex	Italjet Gresini Moto2	3	0	0	0	0	0*	35th*
2026	Moto2	Kalex	Red Bull KTM Ajo	1	0	0	0	0	0*	35th*
Total				**5**	**0**	**0**	**0**	**0**	**0**	

==== By class ====
Class	Seasons	1st GP	1st pod	1st win	Race	Win	Podiums	Pole	FLap	Pts	WChmp
Moto2	2025–present	2025 Czech Republic			5	0	0	0	0	0	0
Total	2025–present				**5**	**0**	**0**	**0**	**0**	**0**	**0**

==== Races by year ====
(key) (Races in bold indicate pole position; races in italics indicate fastest lap)

Year	Class	Bike	1	2	3	4	5	6	7	8	9	10	11	12	13	14	15	16	17	18	19	20	21	22	Pos	Pts
2025	Moto2	Kalex	THA	ARG	AME	QAT	SPA	FRA	GBR	ARA	ITA	NED	GER	CZE; Ret	AUT	HUN	CAT	RSM	JPN	INA	AUS	MAL	POR	VAL	NC	0
2026	Moto2	Kalex	THA	BRA	USA	SPA	FRA	CAT	ITA	HUN	CZE; 25	NED; 23	GER; 23	GBR	ARA	RSM	AUT	JPN; 24	INA	AUS	MAL	QAT	POR	VAL	35th*	0*

* Season still in progress.

=== 8 Hours of Spa ===
Year	Class	Team	Co-riders	Bike	Pos
2025	**SST**	(Poland) Wójcik Racing Team	(Poland) Mateusz Molik (Spain) Jordi Torres	CBR1000RR-R	5th

=== Suzuka 8 Hours ===
Year	Class	Team	Co-riders	Bike	Pos
2025	**SST**	(Poland) Wójcik Racing Team	(Poland) Mateusz Molik (Spain) Jordi Torres	CBR1000RR-R	4th
