= 2026 Moto2 World Championship =

17th running of the Moto2 World Championship

The 2026 FIM Moto2 World Championship is the intermediate class of the 78th Fédération Internationale de Motocyclisme (FIM) Road Racing World Championship season.

== Teams and riders ==
Team	Constructor	Motorcycle	No.	Rider	Rounds
(Italy) Blu Cru Pramac Yamaha Moto2	Boscoscuro	B-26	28	(Spain) Izan Guevara	1–21
(Italy) Blu Cru Pramac Yamaha Moto2	Boscoscuro	B-26	54	(Spain) Alberto Ferrández	1–15, 17–21
(Belgium) Elf Marc VDS Racing Team	Boscoscuro	B-26	44	(Spain) Arón Canet	1–18, 21
(Belgium) Elf Marc VDS Racing Team	Boscoscuro	B-26	22	(Australia) Jacob Roulstone	19
(Belgium) Elf Marc VDS Racing Team	Boscoscuro	B-26	53	(Turkey) Deniz Öncü	1–21
(Italy) SpeedRS Team (Note: This is the team name entered in the championship. Other team names used during the season are Sync Group SpeedRS Team (round 1), HDR SpeedRS Team (rounds 2–3, 9–10), Beta Tools SpeedRS Team (rounds 4, 6, 14–21), Folladore SpeedRS Team (rounds 5, 13), MB Conveyors SpeedRS Team (rounds 7–8, 11), and GT Trevisan SpeedRS Team (round 12).)	Boscoscuro	B-26	13	(Italy) Celestino Vietti	1–21
(Italy) SpeedRS Team	Boscoscuro	B-26	32	(Italy) Luca Lunetta	1, 4–21
(Italy) SpeedRS Team	Boscoscuro	B-26	8	(Italy) Dennis Foggia	2–3
(Switzerland) Klint Racing Team	Forward	F2	9	(Spain) Jorge Navarro	1–5
(Switzerland) Klint Racing Team	Forward	F2	85	(Spain) Xabi Zurutuza	6–7
(Switzerland) Klint Racing Team	Forward	F2	85	(Spain) Xabi Zurutuza	8–21
(Switzerland) Klint Racing Team	Forward	F2	11	(Spain) Álex Escrig	1–21
(Switzerland) Klint Racing Team	Forward	F2	24	(Spain) Marcos Ramírez	13–15
(Spain) CFMoto Aspar Team (Note: This is the team name entered in the championship. Other team names used during the season are CFMoto Inde Aspar Team (rounds 1–2, 5, 7–9, 13), CFMoto Power Electronics Aspar Team (rounds 3, 16–18, 20–21), CFMoto Gaviota Aspar Team (rounds 4, 12), CFMoto Impulse Aspar Team (round 6), CFMoto Azul Marino Aspar Team (rounds 10–11), CFMoto Aspar European Privilege Team (round 14), CFMoto Inde Team (round 15), and CFMoto RCB Aspar Team (round 19).)	Kalex	Moto2	80	(Colombia) David Alonso	1–21
(Spain) CFMoto Aspar Team	Kalex	Moto2	96	(Spain) Daniel Holgado	1–21
(Japan) Idemitsu Honda Team Asia	Kalex	Moto2	64	(Indonesia) Mario Aji	1–5, 11–21
(Japan) Idemitsu Honda Team Asia	Kalex	Moto2	22	(Australia) Jacob Roulstone	8–10
(Japan) Idemitsu Honda Team Asia	Kalex	Moto2	72	(Japan) Taiyo Furusato	1–21
(Italy) Italjet Gresini Moto2	Kalex	Moto2	3	(Spain) Sergio García	1–18
(Italy) Italjet Gresini Moto2	Kalex	Moto2	23	(Italy) Matteo Ferrari	19–21
(Italy) Italjet Gresini Moto2	Kalex	Moto2	21	(Spain) Alonso López	1–9, 12–21 (Note: Alonso López was entered for the first Friday practice session during round 9, before being replaced by Milan Pawelec due to injury.)
(Italy) Italjet Gresini Moto2	Kalex	Moto2	40	(Poland) Milan Pawelec	9–11
(Italy) Italtrans Racing Team	Kalex	Moto2	17	(Spain) Daniel Muñoz	1–10, 12–21
(Italy) Italtrans Racing Team	Kalex	Moto2	99	(Spain) Adrián Huertas	1–21
(Germany) Liqui Moly Dynavolt Intact GP	Kalex	Moto2	18	(Spain) Manuel González	1–21
(Germany) Liqui Moly Dynavolt Intact GP	Kalex	Moto2	81	(Australia) Senna Agius	1–21
(United States) OnlyFans American Racing Team	Kalex	Moto2	12	(Czech Republic) Filip Salač	1–21
(United States) OnlyFans American Racing Team	Kalex	Moto2	16	(United States) Joe Roberts	1–21
(Spain) QJMotor – MSi (Note: This is the team name entered in the championship. Other team names used during the season are QJMotor – Pont Grup – MSi (rounds 1–2), QJMotor – Galfer – MSi (rounds 3–4), QJMotor – El Motorista – MSi (round 5), QJMotor – Bordoy – MSi (round 6), QJMotor – Green Power – MSi (round 7), QJMotor – Exocom – MSi (rounds 8–9), QJMotor – Xeramic – MSi (round 10), QJMotor – R.O.M.E.A. – MSi (rounds 11, 18), QJMotor – Biolec – MSi (round 12), QJMotor – Reverte – MSi (round 13), QJMotor – Green Power – MSi (round 14), QJMotor – Campolor – MSi (round 15), and QJMotor – JP Financial – MSi (round 16–17).)	Kalex	Moto2	4	(Spain) Iván Ortolá	1–21
(Spain) QJMotor – MSi	Kalex	Moto2	36	(Spain) Ángel Piqueras	1–3, 8–15, 17–21
(Spain) QJMotor – MSi	Kalex	Moto2	24	(Spain) Marcos Ramírez	4–5
(Spain) QJMotor – MSi	Kalex	Moto2	10	(Spain) Unai Orradre	6–7, 16
(Finland) Red Bull KTM Ajo	Kalex	Moto2	95	(Netherlands) Collin Veijer	1–15, 17–21
(Finland) Red Bull KTM Ajo	Kalex	Moto2	40	(Poland) Milan Pawelec	16
(Finland) Red Bull KTM Ajo	Kalex	Moto2	98	(Spain) José Antonio Rueda	1–21
(Italy) Reds Fantic Racing	Kalex	Moto2	7	(Belgium) Barry Baltus	1–9, 12–21
(Italy) Reds Fantic Racing	Kalex	Moto2	9	(Spain) Jorge Navarro	10–11
(Italy) Reds Fantic Racing	Kalex	Moto2	14	(Italy) Tony Arbolino	1–21
(Netherlands) Momoven Idrofoglia RW Racing Team	Kalex	Moto2	71	(Japan) Ayumu Sasaki	1–21
(Netherlands) Momoven Idrofoglia RW Racing Team	Kalex	Moto2	84	(Netherlands) Zonta van den Goorbergh	1–21

Key
Regular rider
Replacement rider
Wildcard rider

All teams used series-specified Pirelli tyres and Triumph 765cc 3-cylinder engines.

=== Constructor changes ===
- QJMotor – MSi switched to Kalex bikes after running the Boscoscuro chassis for the previous two seasons.

=== Rider changes ===
- Luca Lunetta made his debut in the intermediate class for SpeedRS Team after spending two seasons in Moto3 with Sic58 Squadra Corse. He replaced Alonso López, who left the team to join Italjet Gresini Racing.
- Ángel Piqueras was promoted to the Moto2 outfit of the MSi team, joining Iván Ortolá as his new teammate.
- Daniel Muñoz, who was appointed as a replacement rider for the injured Deniz Öncü for the second half of the 2025 season, made his full-time debut in the intermediate class by joining the Italtrans Racing Team. He replaced Diogo Moreira who stepped up to the MotoGP class, riding for LCR Honda.
- Italjet Gresini Racing fielded an all-new line up as Darryn Binder and Albert Arenas left the team. Both riders were replaced by Sergio García and Alonso López. López moved from SpeedRS Team, while García made his full-time comeback in Moto2 after being prematurely dismissed in 2025 from the MSi team due to poor results.
- Elf Marc VDS Racing Team fielded an all-new line up as Arón Canet and Deniz Öncü joined the team from Fantic Racing and Red Bull KTM Ajo, respectively. Both replaced Filip Salač and Jake Dixon. While Salač joined OnlyFans American Racing Team, Dixon permanently left the class to join Honda on a multi-year deal from the 2026 Superbike World Championship season onwards.
- José Antonio Rueda, 2025 Moto3 World Champion, made his intermediate class debut with the Red Bull KTM Ajo team, joining Collin Veijer who went into his second season with the team.
- Marcos Ramírez was due to race for OnlyFans American Racing Team in 2026. On 7 November 2025, it was announced that both the team and rider had mutually agreed to end their collaboration at the end of the 2025 season. Ramírez were replaced by Filip Salac, who moved from Elf Marc VDS Racing Team.
- Taiyo Furusato was promoted to the Moto2 outfit of the Idemitsu Honda Team Asia to join Mario Aji. He replaced his Japanese compatriot Yuki Kunii, who left the class after a single season.
- Albert Arenas left the championship to join AS Racing Team aboard a Yamaha to compete in the 2026 Supersport World Championship.
- Tony Arbolino left Blu Cru Pramac Yamaha Racing after just one season to join Fantic Racing, replacing Arón Canet who moved to Elf Marc VDS Racing Team.
- Alberto Ferrández made his full-time debut in the intermediate class by joining Blu Cru Pramac Yamaha Racing, replacing Tony Arbolino.

==== Mid-season changes ====
- Luca Lunetta suffered a broken tibia and fibula following an accident in Thailand. He was replaced for the rounds in Brazil and the United States by Dennis Foggia.
- Ángel Piqueras suffered a broken femur and ankle following an accident in the United States. He was replaced by Marcos Ramírez for the rounds in Spain and France and then by Unai Orradre in Catalonia and Italy.
- Jorge Navarro suffered a broken finger following an accident in France. He was replaced by Xabi Zurutuza for the rounds in Catalonia and Italy. Zurutuza's replacement of Navarro became permanent starting from Hungary after Navarro left Klint Racing Team by mutual agreement.
- Mario Aji is recovering from surgery on his arm and neck. He was replaced by Jacob Roulstone in Hungary, Czechia, and the Netherlands.
- Alonso López withdrew from the round in Czechia due to a broken right hand. Milan Pawelec replaced him for the remainder of the weekend and the following rounds in the Netherlands and Germany.
- Barry Baltus suffered a dislocated left shoulder and an injured tendon following an accident in Czechia during practice. He was replaced by the returning Jorge Navarro for the Dutch and German rounds.
- Collin Veijer suffered a broken collabone after an accident in practice in Austria. He was replaced by Milan Pawelec in Japan.
- Ángel Piqueras broke his left hand after an accident in practice in Austria. He was replaced by Unai Orradre in Japan.
- Sergio García suffered a hand injury after an accident in practice in Australia. He was replaced by Matteo Ferrari in Malaysia, Qatar, and Portugal.
- Arón Canet suffered a broken thumb after an accident in practice in Australia. He was replaced by Jacob Roulstone in Malaysia.

== Calendar ==
The following Grands Prix are provisionally scheduled to take place in 2026:

Round	Date	Grand Prix	Circuit	Ref.
1	1 March	PT Grand Prix of Thailand	Buriram International Circuit, Buriram	
2	22 March	Estrella Galicia 0,0 Grand Prix of Brazil	Autódromo Internacional Ayrton Senna, Goiânia	
3	29 March	Red Bull Grand Prix of the United States	Circuit of the Americas, Austin	
4	26 April	Estrella Galicia 0,0 Grand Prix of Spain	Circuito de Jerez, Jerez de la Frontera	
5	10 May	Michelin Grand Prix of France	Bugatti Circuit, Le Mans	
6	17 May	(Catalonia) Monster Energy Grand Prix of Catalunya	Circuit de Barcelona-Catalunya, Montmeló	
7	31 May	Brembo Grand Prix of Italy	Mugello Circuit, Scarperia e San Piero	
8	7 June	Grand Prix of Hungary	Balaton Park Circuit, Balatonfőkajár	
9	21 June	(Czech Republic) Monster Energy Grand Prix of Czechia	Brno Circuit, Brno	
10	28 June	Tissot Grand Prix of the Netherlands	TT Circuit Assen, Assen	
11	12 July	Liqui Moly Grand Prix of Germany	Sachsenring, Hohenstein-Ernstthal	
12	9 August	(United Kingdom) Qatar Airways Grand Prix of Great Britain	Silverstone Circuit, Silverstone	
13	30 August	Michelin Grand Prix of Aragon	MotorLand Aragón, Alcañiz	
14	13 September	Red Bull Grand Prix of San Marino and the Rimini Riviera	Misano World Circuit, Misano Adriatico	
15	20 September	Qatar Airways Grand Prix of Austria	Red Bull Ring, Spielberg	
16	4 October	Motul Grand Prix of Japan	Motegi Circuit, Motegi	
17	11 October	Pertamina Grand Prix of Indonesia	Mandalika International Street Circuit, Mandalika	
18	25 October (Note: Race cancelled due to inclement weather and low visibility which affected the medical helicopter's ability to fly.)	Red Bull Grand Prix of Australia	Phillip Island Grand Prix Circuit, Phillip Island	
19	1 November	Petronas Grand Prix of Malaysia	Sepang International Circuit, Sepang	
20	8 November (Note: Race was originally scheduled on 12 April, but was rescheduled due to the ongoing Iran war.)	Qatar Airways Grand Prix of Qatar	Lusail International Circuit, Lusail	
21	22 November (Note: Race was originally scheduled on 15 November, but was rescheduled due to the new date of the Qatar GP.)	Repsol Grand Prix of Portugal	Algarve International Circuit, Portimão	
22	29 November (Note: Race was originally scheduled on 22 November, but was rescheduled due to the new date of the Qatar GP.)	(Valencian Community) Motul Grand Prix of Valencia	Circuit Ricardo Tormo, Valencia	

=== Grand Prix locations ===
Location of non-European Grands Prix in 2026.
(scheduled Grand Prix: cancelled Grand Prix)
Location of European Grands Prix in 2026.

=== Calendar changes ===
- Brazil returned to the calendar after a 21-year absence. The last race held in the country took place in 2004 at the Jacarepaguá Circuit in Rio de Janeiro, where it was known as the Rio de Janeiro Grand Prix.
- The Argentine Grand Prix did not return to the calendar this year, as the organisers have confirmed in a statement, aiming to return in 2027. The Argentine Grand Prix came back onto the calendar in 2014 at the new Autódromo Termas de Río Hondo venue, having previously been held on and off in Buenos Aires between 1961 and 1999. However on 21 July 2025, Dorna announced that the Argentine Grand Prix would have a new home starting in the 2027 season. Work is currently underway to return to the Autódromo Oscar y Juan Gálvez.
- Due to the ongoing Iran war, the Qatar Grand Prix, originally scheduled for 12 April, was postponed to 8 November. The Portuguese and Valencian Grands Prix were also rescheduled to a week later.

== Results and standings ==
=== Grands Prix ===
Round	Grand Prix	Pole position	Fastest lap	Winning rider	Winning team	Winning constructor	Report
1	Thailand motorcycle Grand Prix	(Australia) Senna Agius	(Spain) Manuel González	(Spain) Manuel González	(Germany) Liqui Moly Dynavolt Intact GP	(Germany) Kalex	Report
2	(Brazil) Brazilian motorcycle Grand Prix	(Spain) Daniel Holgado	(Spain) Daniel Holgado	(Spain) Daniel Holgado	(Spain) CFMoto Inde Aspar Team	(Germany) Kalex	Report
3	United States motorcycle Grand Prix	(Belgium) Barry Baltus	(Colombia) David Alonso	(Australia) Senna Agius	(Germany) Liqui Moly Dynavolt Intact GP	(Germany) Kalex	Report
4	(Spain) Spanish motorcycle Grand Prix	(Netherlands) Collin Veijer	(Australia) Senna Agius	(Australia) Senna Agius	(Germany) Liqui Moly Dynavolt Intact GP	(Germany) Kalex	Report
5	(France) French motorcycle Grand Prix	(Spain) Izan Guevara	(Spain) Iván Ortolá	(Spain) Izan Guevara	(Italy) Blu Cru Pramac Yamaha Moto2	(Italy) Boscoscuro	Report
6	(Catalonia) Catalan motorcycle Grand Prix	(Italy) Celestino Vietti	(Italy) Celestino Vietti	(Spain) Manuel González	(Germany) Liqui Moly Dynavolt Intact GP	(Germany) Kalex	Report
7	(Italy) Italian motorcycle Grand Prix	(Spain) Manuel González	(Spain) Iván Ortolá	(Spain) Manuel González	(Germany) Liqui Moly Dynavolt Intact GP	(Germany) Kalex	Report
8	(Hungary) Hungarian motorcycle Grand Prix	(Spain) Izan Guevara	(Spain) Manuel González	(Spain) Manuel González	(Germany) Liqui Moly Dynavolt Intact GP	(Germany) Kalex	Report
9	(Czech Republic) Czech motorcycle Grand Prix	(Colombia) David Alonso	(Czech Republic) Filip Salač	(Spain) Iván Ortolá	(Spain) QJMotor – Exocom – MSi	(Germany) Kalex	Report
10	(Netherlands) Dutch TT	(Colombia) David Alonso	(Australia) Senna Agius	(Colombia) David Alonso	(Spain) CFMoto Azul Marino Aspar Team	(Germany) Kalex	Report
11	(Germany) German motorcycle Grand Prix	(Spain) Iván Ortolá	(Spain) Daniel Holgado	(Spain) Iván Ortolá	(Spain) QJMotor – R.O.M.E.A. – MSi	(Germany) Kalex	Report
12	(United Kingdom) British motorcycle Grand Prix	(Spain) Izan Guevara	(Italy) Tony Arbolino	(Czech Republic) Filip Salač	(United States) OnlyFans American Racing Team	(Germany) Kalex	Report
13	Aragon motorcycle Grand Prix	(Spain) Alonso López	(Spain) Iván Ortolá	(Spain) Alonso López	(Italy) Italjet Gresini Moto2	(Germany) Kalex	Report
14	San Marino and Rimini Riviera motorcycle Grand Prix	(Australia) Senna Agius	(Czech Republic) Filip Salač	(Spain) Manuel González	(Germany) Liqui Moly Dynavolt Intact GP	(Germany) Kalex	Report
15	(Austria) Austrian motorcycle Grand Prix	(Czech Republic) Filip Salač	(Spain) Izan Guevara	(Spain) Izan Guevara	(Italy) Blu Cru Pramac Yamaha Moto2	(Italy) Boscoscuro	Report
16	(Japan) Japanese motorcycle Grand Prix	(Spain) Izan Guevara	(Italy) Celestino Vietti	(Spain) Izan Guevara	(Italy) Blu Cru Pramac Yamaha Moto2	(Italy) Boscoscuro	Report
17	(Indonesia) Indonesian motorcycle Grand Prix	(Spain) Izan Guevara	(Spain) Álex Escrig	(Spain) Izan Guevara	(Italy) Blu Cru Pramac Yamaha Moto2	(Italy) Boscoscuro	Report
18	(Australia) Australian motorcycle Grand Prix	(Spain) Manuel González	Race cancelled				Report
19	(Malaysia) Malaysian motorcycle Grand Prix	(Spain) Daniel Holgado	(Colombia) David Alonso	(Colombia) David Alonso	(Spain) CFMoto RCB Aspar Team	(Germany) Kalex	Report
20	Qatar motorcycle Grand Prix	(Spain) Álex Escrig	(Spain) Iván Ortolá	(Spain) Daniel Holgado	(Spain) CFMoto Power Electronics Aspar Team	(Germany) Kalex	Report
21	(Portugal) Portuguese motorcycle Grand Prix	(Australia) Senna Agius	(Spain) Daniel Muñoz	(Spain) Daniel Muñoz	(Italy) Italtrans Racing Team	(Germany) Kalex	Report
22	(Valencian Community) Valencian motorcycle Grand Prix						Report

=== Riders' standings ===
Scoring system

Points are awarded to the top fifteen finishers. A rider has to finish the race to earn points.

Position	1st	2nd	3rd	4th	5th	6th	7th	8th	9th	10th	11th	12th	13th	14th	15th
Points	25	20	16	13	11	10	9	8	7	6	5	4	3	2	1

Pos.	Rider	Bike	Team	THA‡ (Thailand)	BRA (Brazil)	USA (United States)	SPA (Spain)	FRA (France)	CAT (Catalonia)	ITA (Italy)	HUN (Hungary)	CZE (Czech Republic)	NED (Netherlands)	GER (Germany)	GBR (United Kingdom)	ARA (Aragon)	RSM (San Marino)	AUT (Austria)	JPN (Japan)	INA (Indonesia)	AUS (Australia)	MAL (Malaysia)	QAT (Qatar)	POR (Portugal)	VAL (Valencian Community)	Pts
1	(Spain) Manuel González	Kalex	Liqui Moly Dynavolt Intact GP	1^{F}	3	5	2	2	1	1^{P}	1^{F}	5	2	6	14	6	1	4	22	2	C^{P}	5	6	Ret		286.5
2	(Spain) Izan Guevara	Boscoscuro	Blu Cru Pramac Yamaha Moto2	2	6	3	7	1^{P}	3	7	6^{P}	6	4	3	5^{P}	2	6	1^{F}	1^{P}	1^{P}	C	4	Ret	7		282
3	(Spain) Iván Ortolá	Kalex	QJMotor – MSi	4	10	11	10	3^{F}	4	Ret^{F}	Ret	1	5	1^{P}	2	5^{F}	4	5	4	6	C	8	2^{F}	5		230.5
4	(Spain) Daniel Holgado	Kalex	CFMoto Aspar Team	3	1^{P F}	16	11	DSQ	5	3	5	7	6	2^{F}	4	7	Ret	7	8	3	C	2^{P}	1	6		225
5	(Colombia) David Alonso	Kalex	CFMoto Aspar Team	Ret	5	4^{F}	4	5	6	18	4	2^{P}	1^{P}	Ret	21	3	9	3	5	DNS	C	1^{F}	4	4		217
6	(Australia) Senna Agius	Kalex	Liqui Moly Dynavolt Intact GP	18^{P}	19	1	1^{F}	7	10	4	3	4	3^{F}	4	20	4	Ret^{P}	Ret	13	4	C	15	7	3^{P}		191
7	(Czech Republic) Filip Salač	Kalex	OnlyFans American Racing Team	19	15	21	14	9	7	5	2	3^{F}	8	7	1	Ret	Ret^{F}	2^{P}	3	7	C	14	9	Ret		162
8	(Spain) Alonso López	Kalex	Italjet Gresini Moto2	7	11	7	Ret	4	8	6	8	WD			6	1^{P}	8	6	9	8	C	12	11	2		154.5
9	(Italy) Celestino Vietti	Boscoscuro	SpeedRS Team	6	9	2	5	6	2^{P F}	2	7	9	Ret	Ret	13	14	7	23	6^{F}	Ret	C	9	10	19		146
10	(Spain) Daniel Muñoz	Kalex	Italtrans Racing Team	8	2	14	6	23	11	20	Ret	12	Ret		7	11	12	11	12	5	C	13	5	1^{F}		122
11	(Netherlands) Collin Veijer	Kalex	Red Bull KTM Ajo	5	8	Ret	3^{P}	Ret	Ret	9	23	11	9	9	Ret	Ret	2	DNS		11	C	7	Ret	9		96.5
12	(Spain) Álex Escrig	Forward	Klint Racing Team	12	4	8	9	20	Ret	Ret	21	13	24	15	3	9	10	Ret	18	Ret^{F}	C	10	3^{P}	11		90
13	(Italy) Tony Arbolino	Kalex	Reds Fantic Racing	13	7	10	8	14	17	11	10	19	11	16	Ret^{F}	16	5	14	2	9	C	16	18	19		82.5
14	(Spain) Adrián Huertas	Kalex	Italtrans Racing Team	DNS	12	12	Ret	18	21	12	16	21	7	11	18	10	11	19	11	16	C	6	12	8		64
15	(Belgium) Barry Baltus	Kalex	Reds Fantic Racing	14	14	6^{P}	Ret	Ret	13	8	12	DNS			9	15	3	8	16	18	C	17	15	Ret		61
16	(Spain) José Antonio Rueda	Kalex	Red Bull KTM Ajo	Ret	21	15	20	17	12	13	11	10	17	8	19	17	21	12	10	10	C	11	8	Ret		56
17	(Turkey) Deniz Öncü	Boscoscuro	Elf Marc VDS Racing Team	9	20	20	13	13	22	10	17	18	Ret	17	8	8	20	9	7	22	C	Ret	21	16		47.5
18	(United States) Joe Roberts	Kalex	OnlyFans American Racing Team	Ret	18	9	15	8	Ret	14	15	8	15	12	12	12	13	15	20	DNS	C	18	13	21		47
19	(Italy) Luca Lunetta	Boscoscuro	SpeedRS Team	Ret			18	16	9	16	18	20	12	10	16	18	23	10	21	12	C	Ret	16	23		27
20	(Japan) Ayumu Sasaki	Kalex	Momoven Idrofoglia RW Racing Team	10	DNS	17	12	Ret	15	Ret	19	16	19	13	11	13	DNS	22	14	13	C	Ret	14	20		26
21	(Spain) Ángel Piqueras	Kalex	QJMotor – MSi	Ret	Ret	DNS					DNS	23	14	14	17	Ret	Ret	DNS		17	C	3	20	12		24
22	(Spain) Alberto Ferrández	Boscoscuro	Blu Cru Pramac Yamaha Moto2	15	17	DNS	21	15	18	19	9	22	10	22	15	21	14	DNS		Ret	C	20	19	13		20.5
23	(Netherlands) Zonta van den Goorbergh	Kalex	Momoven Idrofoglia RW Racing Team	Ret	24	22	17	12	19	15	13	15	13	20	24	23	19	20	15	15	C	21	Ret	10		20
24	(Spain) Arón Canet	Boscoscuro	Elf Marc VDS Racing Team	11	22	13	Ret	10	14	Ret	Ret	Ret	16	Ret	Ret	25	15	13	17	Ret	C			14		19.5
25	(Japan) Taiyo Furusato	Kalex	Idemitsu Honda Team Asia	16	Ret	18	Ret	22	20	Ret	14	14	18	5	23	19	17	18	Ret	14	C	Ret	Ret	24		17
26	(Spain) Sergio García	Kalex	Italjet Gresini Moto2	Ret	16	DNS	19	11	23	17	20	17	21	21	10	22	18	24	Ret	21	C					11
27	(Indonesia) Mario Aji	Kalex	Idemitsu Honda Team Asia	Ret	13	Ret	Ret	21						NC	22	24	22	17	Ret	20	C	Ret	22	18		3
28	(Spain) Xabi Zurutuza	Forward	Klint Racing Team						24	Ret	Ret	26	20	19	25	26	Ret	16	19	19	C	19	17	15		1
29	(Spain) Marcos Ramírez	Kalex	QJMotor – MSi				16	19																		0
29	(Spain) Marcos Ramírez	Forward	Klint Racing Team													20	16	21								0
30	(Spain) Unai Orradre	Kalex	QJMotor – MSi						16	21									23							0
31	(Spain) Jorge Navarro	Forward	Klint Racing Team	17	Ret	Ret	Ret	DNS																		0
31	(Spain) Jorge Navarro	Kalex	Reds Fantic Racing										25	18												0
32	(Italy) Dennis Foggia	Boscoscuro	SpeedRS Team		23	19																				0
33	(Italy) Matteo Ferrari	Kalex	Italjet Gresini Moto2																			22	23	22		0
34	(Australia) Jacob Roulstone	Kalex	Idemitsu Honda Team Asia								22	24	22													0
34	(Australia) Jacob Roulstone	Boscoscuro	Elf Marc VDS Racing Team																			Ret				0
35	(Poland) Milan Pawelec	Kalex	Italjet Gresini Moto2									25	23	23												0
35	(Poland) Milan Pawelec	Kalex	Red Bull KTM Ajo																24							0
Pos.	Rider	Bike	Team	THA‡ (Thailand)	BRA (Brazil)	USA (United States)	SPA (Spain)	FRA (France)	CAT (Catalonia)	ITA (Italy)	HUN (Hungary)	CZE (Czech Republic)	NED (Netherlands)	GER (Germany)	GBR (United Kingdom)	ARA (Aragon)	RSM (San Marino)	AUT (Austria)	JPN (Japan)	INA (Indonesia)	AUS (Australia)	MAL (Malaysia)	QAT (Qatar)	POR (Portugal)	VAL (Valencian Community)	Pts

Race key
Colour	Result
Gold	Winner
Silver	2nd place
Bronze	3rd place
Green	Points finish
Blue	Non-points finish
Blue	Non-classified finish (NC)
Purple	Retired (Ret)
Red	Did not qualify (DNQ)
Black	Disqualified (DSQ)
White	Did not start (DNS)
White	Withdrew (WD)
White	Race cancelled (C)
Blank	Did not practice (DNP)
Blank	Excluded (EX)
Blank	Did not arrive (DNA)
Blank	Did not enter (empty cell)
Annotation	Meaning
P	Pole position
F	Fastest lap
Rider key
Colour	Meaning
Light blue	Rookie rider

- ‡ – Half points were awarded during the Thailand Grand Prix as less than 50 percent of the scheduled race distance (but at least three full laps) was completed.

=== Constructors' standings ===
Each constructor is awarded the same number of points as their best placed rider in each race.

Pos.	Constructor	THA‡ (Thailand)	BRA (Brazil)	USA (United States)	SPA (Spain)	FRA (France)	CAT (Catalonia)	ITA (Italy)	HUN (Hungary)	CZE (Czech Republic)	NED (Netherlands)	GER (Germany)	GBR (United Kingdom)	ARA (Aragon)	RSM (San Marino)	AUT (Austria)	JPN (Japan)	INA (Indonesia)	AUS (Australia)	MAL (Malaysia)	QAT (Qatar)	POR (Portugal)	VAL (Valencian Community)	Pts
1	(Germany) Kalex	1	1	1	1	2	1	1	1	1	1	1	1	1	1	2	2	2	C	1	1			442.5
2	(Italy) Boscoscuro	2	6	2	5	1	2	2	6	6	4	3	5	2	6	1	1	1	C	4	10			300
3	(Switzerland) Forward	12	4	8	9	20	24	Ret	21	13	20	15	3	9	10	16	18	19	C	10	3			85
Pos.	Constructor	THA‡ (Thailand)	BRA (Brazil)	USA (United States)	SPA (Spain)	FRA (France)	CAT (Catalonia)	ITA (Italy)	HUN (Hungary)	CZE (Czech Republic)	NED (Netherlands)	GER (Germany)	GBR (United Kingdom)	ARA (Aragon)	RSM (San Marino)	AUT (Austria)	JPN (Japan)	INA (Indonesia)	AUS (Australia)	MAL (Malaysia)	QAT (Qatar)	POR (Portugal)	VAL (Valencian Community)	Pts

- ‡ – Half points were awarded during the Thailand Grand Prix as less than 50 percent of the scheduled race distance (but at least three full laps) was completed.

=== Teams' standings ===
The teams' standings are based on results obtained by regular and substitute riders; wild-card entries are ineligible.

Pos.	Team	Bike No.	THA‡ (Thailand)	BRA (Brazil)	USA (United States)	SPA (Spain)	FRA (France)	CAT (Catalonia)	ITA (Italy)	HUN (Hungary)	CZE (Czech Republic)	NED (Netherlands)	GER (Germany)	GBR (United Kingdom)	ARA (Aragon)	RSM (San Marino)	AUT (Austria)	JPN (Japan)	INA (Indonesia)	AUS (Australia)	MAL (Malaysia)	QAT (Qatar)	POR (Portugal)	VAL (Valencian Community)	Pts
1	(Germany) Liqui Moly Dynavolt Intact GP	18	1^{F}	3	5	2	2	1	1^{P}	1^{F}	5	2	6	14	6	1	4	22	2	C^{P}	5	6			461.5
1	(Germany) Liqui Moly Dynavolt Intact GP	81	18^{P}	19	1	1^{F}	7	10	4	3	4	3^{F}	4	20	4	Ret^{P}	Ret	13	4	C	15	7	^{P}		461.5
2	(Spain) CFMoto Aspar Team	80	Ret	5	4^{F}	4	5	6	18	4	2^{P}	1^{P}	Ret	21	3	9	3	5	DNS	C	1^{F}	4			419
2	(Spain) CFMoto Aspar Team	96	3	1^{P F}	16	11	DSQ	5	3	5	7	6	2^{F}	4	7	Ret	7	8	3	C	2^{P}	1			419
3	(Italy) Blu Cru Pramac Yamaha Moto2	28	2	6	3	7	1^{P}	3	7	6^{P}	6	4	3	5^{P}	2	6	1^{F}	1^{P}	1^{P}	C	4	Ret			290.5
3	(Italy) Blu Cru Pramac Yamaha Moto2	54	15	17	DNS	21	15	18	19	9	22	10	22	15	21	14	DNS		Ret	C	20	19			290.5
4	(Spain) QJMotor – MSi	4	4	10	11	10	3^{F}	4	Ret^{F}	Ret	1	5	1^{P}	2	5^{F}	4	5	4	6	C	8	2^{F}			239.5
4	(Spain) QJMotor – MSi	10						16	21									23							239.5
4	(Spain) QJMotor – MSi	24				16	19																		239.5
4	(Spain) QJMotor – MSi	36	Ret	Ret	DNS					DNS	23	14	14	17	Ret	Ret	DNS		17	C	3	20			239.5
5	(United States) OnlyFans American Racing Team	12	19	15	21	14	9	7	5	2	3^{F}	8	7	1	Ret	Ret^{F}	2^{P}	3	7	C	14	9			209
5	(United States) OnlyFans American Racing Team	16	Ret	18	9	15	8	Ret	14	15	8	15	12	12	12	13	15	20	DNS	C	18	13			209
6	(Italy) SpeedRS Team	8		23	19																				173
6	(Italy) SpeedRS Team	13	6	9	2	5	6	2^{P F}	2	7	9	Ret	Ret	13	14	7	23	6^{F}	Ret	C	9	10			173
6	(Italy) SpeedRS Team	32	Ret			18	16	9	16	18	20	12	10	16	18	23	10	21	12	C	Ret	16			173
7	(Italy) Italtrans Racing Team	17	8	2	14	6	23	11	20	Ret	12	Ret		7	11	12	11	12	5	C	13	5			153
7	(Italy) Italtrans Racing Team	99	DNS	12	12	Ret	18	21	12	16	21	7	11	18	10	11	19	11	16	C	6	12			153
8	(Italy) Italjet Gresini Moto2	3	Ret	16	DNS	19	11	23	17	20	17	21	21	10	22	18	24	Ret	21	C					145.5
8	(Italy) Italjet Gresini Moto2	21	7	11	7	Ret	4	8	6	8	WD			6	1^{P}	8	6	9	8	C	12	11			145.5
8	(Italy) Italjet Gresini Moto2	23																			22	23			145.5
8	(Italy) Italjet Gresini Moto2	40									25	23	23												145.5
9	(Finland) Red Bull KTM Ajo	40																24							145.5
9	(Finland) Red Bull KTM Ajo	95	5	8	Ret	3^{P}	Ret	Ret	9	23	11	9	9	Ret	Ret	2	DNS		11	C	7	Ret			145.5
9	(Finland) Red Bull KTM Ajo	98	Ret	21	15	20	17	12	13	11	10	17	8	19	17	21	12	10	10	C	11	8			145.5
10	(Italy) Reds Fantic Racing	7	14	14	6^{P}	Ret	Ret	13	8	12	DNS			9	15	3	8	16	18	C	17	15			143.5
10	(Italy) Reds Fantic Racing	9										25	18												143.5
10	(Italy) Reds Fantic Racing	14	13	7	10	8	14	17	11	10	19	11	16	Ret^{F}	16	5	14	2	9	C	16	18			143.5
11	(Switzerland) Klint Racing Team	9	17	Ret	Ret	Ret	DNS																		85
11	(Switzerland) Klint Racing Team	11	12	4	8	9	20	Ret	Ret	21	13	24	15	3	9	10	Ret	18	Ret^{F}	C	10	3^{P}			85
11	(Switzerland) Klint Racing Team	85						24	Ret	Ret	26	20	19	25	26	Ret	16	19	19	C	19	17			85
12	(Belgium) Elf Marc VDS Racing Team	22																			Ret				65
12	(Belgium) Elf Marc VDS Racing Team	44	11	22	13	Ret	10	14	Ret	Ret	Ret	16	Ret	Ret	25	15	13	17	Ret	C					65
12	(Belgium) Elf Marc VDS Racing Team	53	9	20	20	13	13	22	10	17	18	Ret	17	8	8	20	9	7	22	C	Ret	21			65
13	(Netherlands) Momoven Idrofoglia RW Racing Team	71	10	DNS	17	12	Ret	15	Ret	19	16	19	13	11	13	DNS	22	14	13	C	Ret	14			40
13	(Netherlands) Momoven Idrofoglia RW Racing Team	84	Ret	24	22	17	12	19	15	13	15	13	20	24	23	19	20	15	15	C	21	Ret			40
14	(Japan) Idemitsu Honda Team Asia	22								22	24	22													20
14	(Japan) Idemitsu Honda Team Asia	64	Ret	13	Ret	Ret	21						NC	22	24	22	17	Ret	20	C	Ret	22			20
14	(Japan) Idemitsu Honda Team Asia	72	16	Ret	18	Ret	22	20	Ret	14	14	18	5	23	19	17	18	Ret	14	C	Ret	Ret			20
Pos.	Team	Bike No.	THA‡ (Thailand)	BRA (Brazil)	USA (United States)	SPA (Spain)	FRA (France)	CAT (Catalonia)	ITA (Italy)	HUN (Hungary)	CZE (Czech Republic)	NED (Netherlands)	GER (Germany)	GBR (United Kingdom)	ARA (Aragon)	RSM (San Marino)	AUT (Austria)	JPN (Japan)	INA (Indonesia)	AUS (Australia)	MAL (Malaysia)	QAT (Qatar)	POR (Portugal)	VAL (Valencian Community)	Pts

- ‡ – Half points were awarded during the Thailand Grand Prix as less than 50 percent of the scheduled race distance (but at least three full laps) was completed.
