= Xabi Zurutuza =

Spanish motorcycle racer (born 2006)

- Nationality: Spanish
- Born: 7 April 2006 (age 20); Legazpi, Gipuzkoa, Spain
- Current team: Klint Racing Team
- Bike number: 85
Motorcycle racing career statistics
Moto2 World Championship
Active years	2025–2026
Manufacturers	Kalex, Forward
2025 championship position	35th (0 pts)
Starts / Wins / Podiums / Poles / F. laps / Points; 16 / 0 / 0 / 0 / 0 / 0
Moto3 World Championship
Active years	2024
Manufacturers	KTM
2024 championship position	23rd (13 pts)
Starts / Wins / Podiums / Poles / F. laps / Points; 18 / 0 / 0 / 0 / 0 / 13

Xabier Zurutuza Torres (born 7 April 2006) is a Spanish Grand Prix motorcycle racer currently competing in the 2026 Moto2 World Championship with Klint Forward Racing.

== Career ==
Zurutuza was the Spanish 85cc Supermotard Champion in 2018, and the Spanish 250cc Supermotard Champion in 2019 and 2020.

In 2021, Zurutuza made his European debut by joining Cuna de Campeones to race in the European Talent Cup. After scoring his maiden podium at Valencia, Zurutuza won in Barcelona and Algarve on his way to third in points.

Zurutuza joined Angeluss MTA in 2022 to step up to the FIM JuniorGP World Championship. After scoring only a best result of ninth in his rookie year, Zurutuza continued with the team for his second season in JuniorGP. At the fourth round at Algarve, Zurutuza scored his maiden series win ahead of Tatchakorn Buasri and Luca Lunetta. Zurutuza then won again in Barcelona and scored both pole positions in Valencia on his way to sixth in points.

With two rounds left in his sophomore season in JuniorGP, Zurutuza signed with Red Bull KTM Ajo to compete in the Moto3 World Championship the following year. After missing the first two races as he was under the age limit, Zurutuza made his debut at the Americas Grand Prix, where he scored his first points in Moto3 by finishing 13th. Despite suffering a scary crash four races later at Mugello, Zurutuza recovered in time for the following round at Assen. In the remaining 13 races Zurutuza scored points twice, taking eighth at Aragón and 14th at Sepang en route to 23rd in the standings.

In late 2024, Zurutuza joined American Racing to compete in the FIM Moto2 European Championship. At the third round of the season at Magny Cours, Zurutuza qualified on pole and scored his maiden podium by finishing third in race one, a feat he also repeated in race two. Zurutuza then closed out the year by taking further podiums at Misano and Valencia to end the season fifth in points. In late 2025, Zurutuza also made his debut in Moto2 for American Racing Team, replacing an injured Joe Roberts for the final two rounds of the season.

Remaining in the FIM Moto2 European Championship for 2026, Zurutuza joined Top Surface Aspar Team for his second season in the series.

== Career statistics ==
=== European Talent Cup ===
==== Races by year ====
(key) (Races in bold indicate pole position; races in italics indicate fastest lap)

Year	Bike	1	2	3	4	5	6	7	8	9	10	11	12	Pos	Pts
2021	Honda	EST; 11	EST; 6	VAL; 3	VAL; 4	CAT; 1	POR; 1	**ARA**; 2	ARA; C	JER; 5	JER; Ret	VAL; 3	VAL; 8	3rd	149

=== FIM JuniorGP World Championship ===
==== Races by year ====
(key) (Races in bold indicate pole position; races in italics indicate fastest lap)

Year	Bike	1	2	3	4	5	6	7	8	9	10	11	12	Pos	Pts
2022	KTM	EST; 10	VAL1; 12	VAL2; 9	CAT1; 15	CAT2; 9	JER1; 14	JER2; 15	POR; 16	RSM; Ret	ARA; 20	VAL1; 20	VAL2; 22	18th	28
2023	KTM	EST; 10	VAL1; 12	VAL2; 5	JER1; Ret	JER2; 6	POR1; 1	POR2; Ret	CAT1; 1	CAT2; Ret	ARA; 4	**VAL1**; 4	**VAL2**; 7	6th	120

=== Grand Prix motorcycle racing ===
==== By season ====
Season	Class	Motorcycle	Team	Race	Win	Podium	Pole	FLap	Pts	Plcd
2024	Moto3	KTM	Red Bull KTM Ajo	18	0	0	0	0	13	23rd
2025	Moto2	Kalex	OnlyFans American Racing Team	2	0	0	0	0	0	35th
2026	Moto2	Forward	Klint Racing Team	14	0	0	0	0	0*	29th*
Total				**34**	**0**	**0**	**0**	**0**	**13**	

==== By class ====
Class	Seasons	1st GP	1st pod	1st win	Race	Win	Podiums	Pole	FLap	Pts	WChmp
Moto3	2024	2024 Americas			18	0	0	0	0	13	0
Moto2	2025–2026	2025 Portuguese			16	0	0	0	0	0	0
Total	2024–2026				**34**	**0**	**0**	**0**	**0**	**13**	0

==== Races by year ====
(key) (Races in bold indicate pole position, races in italics indicate fastest lap)

Year	Class	Bike	1	2	3	4	5	6	7	8	9	10	11	12	13	14	15	16	17	18	19	20	21	22	Pos	Pts
2024	Moto3	KTM	QAT	POR	AME; 13	SPA; 22	FRA; 16	CAT; 19	ITA; Ret	NED; 19	GER; 16	GBR; Ret	AUT; 18	ARA; 8	RSM; 18	EMI; 19	INA; Ret	JPN; 18	AUS; 17	THA; 18	MAL; 14	SLD; 22			23rd	13
2025	Moto2	Kalex	THA	ARG	AME	QAT	SPA	FRA	GBR	ARA	ITA	NED	GER	CZE	AUT	HUN	CAT	RSM	JPN	INA	AUS	MAL	POR; Ret	VAL; 21	35th	0
2026	Moto2	Forward	THA	BRA	USA	SPA	FRA	CAT; 24	ITA; Ret	HUN; Ret	CZE; 26	NED; 20	GER; 19	GBR; 25	ARA; 26	RSM; Ret	AUT; 16	JPN; 19	INA; 19	AUS; C	MAL; 19	QAT; 17	POR	VAL	29th*	0*

* Season still in progress.

=== FIM Moto2 European Championship ===
==== Races by year ====
(key) (Races in bold indicate pole position, races in italics indicate fastest lap)

Year	Bike	1	2	3	4	5	6	7	8	9	10	11	Pos	Pts
2025	Kalex	EST1; 4	EST2; 7	JER; 6	**MAG1**; 3	**MAG2**; 3	ARA1; Ret	ARA2; 9	MIS; 2	CAT1; 6	CAT2; 4	VAL; 2	5th	134
