= Zurutuza =

Zurutuza is a Spanish surname. Notable people with the surname include:

- David Zurutuza (born 1986), Spanish footballer
- Xabi Zurutuza (born 2006), Spanish motorcycle racer
