= 2025 FIM Moto2 European Championship =

Edition of a motorsport season

2025 FIM Moto2 European Championship
Previous:	2024	Next:	2026
Support series: JuniorGP World Championship; European Talent Cup; FIM Stock European Championship

The 2025 FIM Moto2 European Championship was the sixteenth season of the class and the tenth under the FIM banner.

The season was held over 11 races over 7 meetings, beginning on 4 May at Estoril and ending on 23 November at Valencia.

== Calendar and results ==
The provisional calendar was announced in October 2024.

round	Date	Circuit	Pole position	Fastest lap	Race winner	Winning team	ref
1	4 May	(Portugal) Estoril	(Italy) Francesco Mongiardo	(Spain) Roberto García	(Spain) Unai Orradre	(Italy) Team Ciatti - Boscoscuro	
1	4 May	(Portugal) Estoril	(Italy) Francesco Mongiardo	(Spain) Unai Orradre	(Spain) Alberto Ferrández	(Spain) Finetwork Team	
2	1 June	(Spain) Jerez	(Poland) Milan Pawelec	(Poland) Milan Pawelec	(Spain) Unai Orradre	(Italy) Team Ciatti - Boscoscuro	
3	6 July	(France) Magny-Cours	(Spain) Xabi Zurutuza	(Poland) Milan Pawelec	(Spain) Alberto Ferrández	(Spain) GV Racing Moto2	
3	6 July	(France) Magny-Cours	(Spain) Xabi Zurutuza	(Italy) Alberto Surra	(Italy) Alberto Surra	(United States) Andifer American Racing	
4	27 July	(Spain) Aragón	(Italy) Alberto Surra	(Spain) Unai Orradre	(Spain) Alberto Ferrández	(Spain) GV Racing Moto2	
4	27 July	(Spain) Aragón	(Italy) Alberto Surra	(Italy) Alessandro Morosi	(Poland) Milan Pawelec	(Spain) AGR Team	
5	21 September	(Italy) Misano	(Spain) Unai Orradre (Note: Eric Fernández were the fastest riders in Qualifying, but was handed a 6–place grid penalty due to slow riding and disturbing another rider during the Q2 session.)	(Spain) Eric Fernández	(Italy) Alberto Surra	(United States) Andifer American Racing	
6	2 November	(Spain) Catalunya	(Spain) Eric Fernández	(Spain) Xabi Zurutuza	(Spain) Unai Orradre	(Italy) Team Ciatti – Boscoscuro	
6	2 November	(Spain) Catalunya	(Spain) Eric Fernández	(Spain) Alberto Ferrández	(Poland) Milan Pawelec	(Spain) AGR Team	
7	23 November	(Spain) Valencia	(Spain) Eric Fernández	(Spain) Xabi Zurutuza	(Poland) Milan Pawelec	(Spain) AGR Team	

== Entry list ==
2025 entry list
Team	Constructor	No.	Rider	Rounds
(Spain) Easyrace Team	Boscoscuro	28	(India) Geoffrey Emmanuel	1–2, 4, 7
(Spain) Easyrace Team	Boscoscuro	38	(Norway) Ola Nesbakken	1
(Spain) Easyrace Team	Boscoscuro	73	(Italy) Alessio Guarnieri	2
(Spain) Fau55 Tey Racing	Boscoscuro	4	(Spain) Eric Fernández	1–2, 5–7
(Spain) Fau55 Tey Racing	Boscoscuro	8	(Spain) Marco Tapia	4
(Spain) Fau55 Tey Racing	Boscoscuro	49	(Italy) Francesco Mongiardo	All
(Spain) Fau55 Tey Racing	Boscoscuro	58	(Italy) Luca Lunetta	7
(Spain) Fau55 Tey Racing	Boscoscuro	88	(Qatar) Abdulla Al Qubaisi	All
(Spain) Fau55 Tey Racing	Boscoscuro	91	(Spain) Borja Jiménez	4–7
(Spain) Finetwork Team	Boscoscuro	11	(Spain) Adrián Cruces	1, 3–5
(Spain) Finetwork Team	Boscoscuro	54	(Spain) Alberto Ferrández	1–2
(Spain) GV Racing Moto2	Boscoscuro	54	(Spain) Alberto Ferrández	3–4
(Spain) GV Racing Moto2	Boscoscuro	82	(Spain) Mario Mayor	1–3, 5–7
(Spain) GV Racing Moto2	Boscoscuro	99	(Spain) Óscar Gutiérrez	1, 4–7
(Italy) Team Ciatti - Boscoscuro	Boscoscuro	10	(Spain) Unai Orradre	All
(Italy) Team Ciatti - Boscoscuro	Boscoscuro	54	(Spain) Alberto Ferrández	5–7
(Italy) Team Ciatti - Boscoscuro	Boscoscuro	64	(Slovenia) Enej Krševan	All
(Italy) Team Ciatti - Boscoscuro	Boscoscuro	77	(Italy) Mattia Volpi	1–6
(Switzerland) Swiss Superbike Academy Forward Junior Team	Forward	17	(Spain) Daniel Muñoz	1–4
(Spain) AGR Team	Kalex	20	(Netherlands) Owen van Trigt	6–7
(Spain) AGR Team	Kalex	44	(Poland) Milan Pawelec	All
(United States) Andifer American Racing	Kalex	67	(Italy) Alberto Surra	All
(United States) Andifer American Racing	Kalex	85	(Spain) Xabi Zurutuza	All
(Spain) Cardoso Racing	Kalex	27	(United States) Maxwell Toth	1–4, 7
(Spain) Cardoso Racing	Kalex	29	(Australia) Harrison Voight	All
(Spain) Cardoso Racing	Kalex	31	(Spain) Roberto García	1–2
(Spain) Cardoso Racing	Kalex	70	(United Kingdom) Joshua Whatley	All
(Spain) Cardoso Racing	Kalex	92	(United States) Rossi Moor	5–7
(Italy) Eagle-1 Team	Kalex	19	(Italy) Alessandro Morosi	All
(Italy) Face Racing	Kalex	21	(Italy) Riccardo Rossi	4
(Italy) Face Racing	Kalex	69	(Spain) Marcos Ruda	5–7
(Italy) Face Racing	Kalex	89	(Romania) Demis Mihaila	1–3
(Spain) Fau55 Tey Racing	Kalex	91	(Spain) Borja Jiménez	1–3
(Germany) F.Koch Rennsport	Kalex	18	(Germany) Jona Eisenkolb	All
(Spain) Kawasaki JDO Racing Team	Kalex	40	(Spain) Román Ramos	6
(Spain) MDR Competición	Kalex	72	(Spain) Yeray Ruiz	All
(Spain) Mission Grand Prix	Kalex	41	(Spain) Héctor Garzó	3
(Spain) Mission Grand Prix	Kalex	97	(South Korea) Kim Jeong-soo	1–2, 4–7
(Italy) MMR	Kalex	43	(Spain) Xavier Artigas	5–7
(Italy) MMR	Kalex	92	(United States) Rossi Moor	1–4
(Spain) Promoracing	Kalex	2	(Italy) Lorenzo Sommariva	1–2
(Spain) Promoracing	Kalex	7	(France) Johan Gimbert	All
(Spain) SF Racing	Kalex	5	(France) Lorenzo Fellon	All
(Spain) STV Laglisse Racing	Kalex	51	(Mexico) Juan Uriostegui	1–2, 4–6
(Spain) STV Laglisse Racing	Kalex	57	(Spain) Javier Palomera	1–2, 4–7
(Spain) STV Laglisse Racing	Kalex	71	(Morocco) Anas Sorhmat	1–2
(Spain) Team Estrella Galicia 0,0	Kalex	94	(Uruguay) Facundo Llambias	All
Team Stylobike Yamaha Philippines	Kalex	8	(Spain) Marco Tapia	1–3
Team Stylobike Yamaha Philippines	Kalex	32	(Spain) Marcos Ludeña	4–7
Team Stylobike Yamaha Philippines	Kalex	36	(Italy) Cristian Lolli	All
(Italy) MMR	NTS motorcycle	41	(Spain) Héctor Garzó	5–6

== Championship' standings ==
Scoring system

Points were awarded to the top fifteen finishers. Rider had to finish the race to earn points.

Position	1st	2nd	3rd	4th	5th	6th	7th	8th	9th	10th	11th	12th	13th	14th	15th
Points	25	20	16	13	11	10	9	8	7	6	5	4	3	2	1

=== Riders' championship ===
Pos.	Rider	Bike	EST (Portugal)		JER (Spain)	MAG (France)		ARA (Spain)		MIS (Italy)	CAT (Spain)		VAL (Spain)	Points
1	(Poland) Milan Pawelec	Kalex	8	4	4^{P F}	2^{F}	8	8	1	3	4	1	1	174
2	(Spain) Unai Orradre	Boscoscuro	1	2^{F}	1	4	11	2^{F}	3	Ret^{P}	1	6	5	170
3	(Italy) Alberto Surra	Kalex	3	5	7	6	1^{F}	4^{P}	8^{P}	1	7	7	4	148
4	(Spain) Alberto Ferrández	Boscoscuro	Ret	1	5	1	4	1	5	Ret	3	3^{F}	Ret	142
5	(Spain) Xabi Zurutuza	Kalex	4	7	6	3^{P}	3^{P}	Ret	9	2	6^{F}	4	2^{F}	134
6	(Italy) Francesco Mongiardo	Boscoscuro	2^{P}	3^{P}	10	9	20	Ret	6	Ret	Ret	14	6	71
7	(Spain) Eric Fernández	Boscoscuro	Ret	6	2					Ret^{F}	2^{P}	2^{P}	23^{P}	70
8	(Italy) Alessandro Morosi	Kalex	9	14	12	10	12	6	2^{F}	Ret	13	11	8	69
9	(Spain) Yeray Ruiz	Kalex	10	9	11	12	7	7	4	9	19	12	24	64
10	(Spain) Daniel Muñoz	Forward	5	Ret	8	5	9	3	Ret					53
11	(France) Johan Gimbert	Kalex	Ret	11	DNS	14	6	9	12	7	10	8	Ret	51
12	(Uruguay) Facundo Llambias	Kalex	Ret	Ret	9	11	2	19	Ret	6	DNS	DNS	14	44
13	(Spain) Óscar Gutiérrez	Boscoscuro	7	8				Ret	14	11	8	9	Ret	39
14	(Spain) Xavier Artigas	Kalex								Ret	5	5	3	38
15	(Spain) Adrián Cruces	Boscoscuro	Ret	Ret		21	5	5	Ret	5				33
16	(Spain) Marco Tapia	Kalex	6	Ret	18	8	19							31
16	(Spain) Marco Tapia	Boscoscuro						12	7					31
17	(Australia) Harrison Voight	Kalex	Ret	DNS	24	18	14	Ret	10	4	20	16	11	26
18	(France) Lorenzo Fellon	Kalex	13	16	Ret	13	13	Ret	13	8	16	18	10	26
19	(Spain) Javier Palomera	Kalex	20	10	17			15	11	13	9	13	15	26
20	(United States) Rossi Moor	Kalex	17	13	14	7	18	10	15	14	18	19	17	23
21	(Spain) Roberto García	Kalex	Ret^{F}	12	3									20
22	(United Kingdom) Joshua Whatley	Kalex	14	Ret	13	22	10	18	17	Ret	Ret	17	7	20
23	(Spain) Borja Jiménez	Kalex	12	17	15	DNS	DNS							19
23	(Spain) Borja Jiménez	Boscoscuro						Ret	Ret	18	12	10	12	19
24	(Slovenia) Enej Krševan	Boscoscuro	11	15	20	15	Ret	14	Ret	12	14	Ret	13	18
25	(Spain) Marcos Ludeña	Kalex						13	16	17	11	15	9	16
26	(Italy) Cristian Lolli	Kalex	22	19	21	17	15	16	18	10	17	22	19	7
27	(Italy) Mattia Volpi	Boscoscuro	Ret	Ret	22	16	17	11	DNS					5
28	(Spain) Mario Mayor	Boscoscuro	Ret	Ret	16	DSQ	DNS			15	21	Ret	Ret	1
29	(Italy) Lorenzo Sommariva	Kalex	15	21	25									1
30	(Spain) Román Ramos	Kalex									15	20		1
31	(Qatar) Abdulla Al Qubaisi	Boscoscuro	16	18	Ret	19	Ret	20	20	19	22	23	20	0
32	(Spain) Marcos Ruda	Kalex								16	Ret	21	18	0
33	(United States) Maxwell Toth	Kalex	WD	WD	Ret	DNS	DNS						16	0
34	(Mexico) Juan Uriostegui	Kalex	21	20	23			17	19	Ret	DNS	DNS		0
35	(India) Geoffrey Emmanuel	Boscoscuro	18	Ret	26			21	21				Ret	0
36	(Germany) Jona Eisenkolb	Kalex	19	22	27	20	DSQ	22	22	Ret	23	25	22	0
37	(Romania) Demis Mihaila	Kalex	Ret	Ret	19	WD	WD							0
38	(Netherlands) Owen van Trigt	Kalex									Ret	24	21	0
39	(South Korea) Kim Jeong-soo	Kalex	DNPQ	DNPQ	DNQ			23	23	DNPQ	Ret	DNS	Ret	0
40	(Norway) Ola Nesbakken	Boscoscuro	DNQ	23										0
	(Morocco) Anas Sorhmat	Kalex	DNPQ	DNPQ	DNPQ									
	(Italy) Riccardo Rossi	Kalex						DNS	DNS					
	(Italy) Alessio Guarnieri	Boscoscuro			DNS									
	(Spain) Héctor Garzó	Kalex				WD	WD							
	(Spain) Héctor Garzó	NTS								WD	WD	WD		
	(Italy) Luca Lunetta	Boscoscuro											WD	
Pos.	Rider	Bike	EST (Portugal)		JER (Spain)	MAG (France)		ARA (Spain)		MIS (Italy)	CAT (Spain)		VAL (Spain)	Points

Colour	Result
Gold	Winner
Silver	Second place
Bronze	Third place
Green	Points classification
Blue	Non-points classification
Blue	Non-classified finish (NC)
Purple	Retired, not classified (Ret)
Red	Did not qualify (DNQ)
Red	Did not pre-qualify (DNPQ)
Black	Disqualified (DSQ)
White	Did not start (DNS)
White	Withdrew (WD)
White	Race cancelled (C)
Blank	Did not practice (DNP)
Blank	Did not arrive (DNA)
Blank	Excluded (EX)

P – Pole position
F – Fastest lap
