= Manuel González (motorcyclist) =

Spanish motorcycle racer

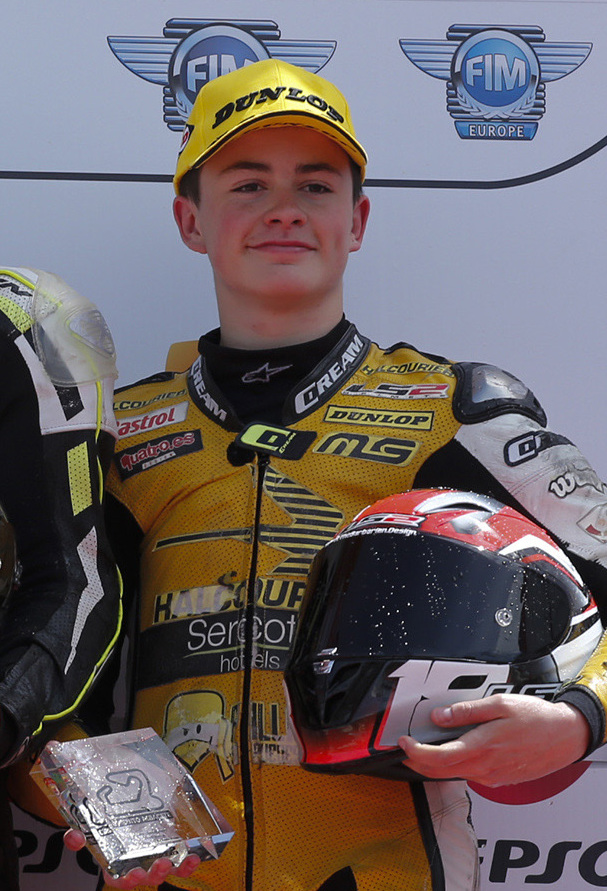
- González in 2017
- Nationality: Spanish
- Born: 4 August 2002 (age 24); Madrid, Spain
- Current team: Liqui Moly Dynavolt Intact GP
- Bike number: 18
Motorcycle racing career statistics
Moto2 World Championship
Active years	2021–
Manufacturers	MV Agusta, Kalex
2025 championship position	2nd (257 pts)
Starts / Wins / Podiums / Poles / F. laps / Points; 101 / 10 / 25 / 10 / 9 / 960
Supersport World Championship
Active years	2020–2021
Manufacturers	Kawasaki, Yamaha
Championships	0
2021 championship position	3rd (286 pts)
Starts / Wins / Podiums / Poles / F. laps / Points; 37 / 2 / 7 / 2 / 3 / 412
Supersport 300 World Championship
Active years	2017–2019
Manufacturers	Yamaha, Kawasaki
Championships	1 (2019)
2019 championship position	1st (161 pts)
Starts / Wins / Podiums / Poles / F. laps / Points; 19 / 3 / 9 / 3 / 1 / 221

Manuel González Simón (born 4 August 2002) is a Spanish Grand Prix motorcycle racer competing in the Moto2 World Championship for Liqui Moly Dynavolt Intact GP.

== Career ==
=== Moto2 World Championship ===
==== Liqui Moly Dynavolt Intact GP (2025–) ====
González is set to remain with the Liqui Moly Dynavolt Intact GP in 2027 alongside David Almansa.

=== MotoGP ===
==== Trackhouse Racing (testing 2025) ====
In 2025, Trackhouse Racing confirmed González for the Aragon MotoGP test on the day after the Aragon GP. He rode an Aprilia RS-GP25 bike.

== Career statistics ==
=== Red Bull MotoGP Rookies Cup ===
==== Races by year ====
(key) (Races in bold indicate pole position; races in italics indicate fastest lap)

Year	1	2	3	4	5	6	7	8	9	10	11	12	13	Pos	Pts
2016	JER1; 7	JER2; 6	ASS1; 12	ASS2; Ret	SAC1; 17	SAC2; 15	RBR1; 17	RBR2; 18	BRN1; 15	BRN2; 8	MIS; 16	ARA1; 21	ARA2; 9	16th	40

=== FIM CEV Moto3 Junior World Championship ===
==== Races by year ====
(key) (Races in bold indicate pole position, races in italics indicate fastest lap)

Year	Bike	1	2	3	4	5	6	7	8	9	10	11	12	Pos	Pts
2016	Honda	VAL1	VAL2	LMS	ARA	CAT1	CAT2	ALB	ALG	JER1; 30	JER2; Ret	VAL1; 26	VAL2; 26	NC	0

=== European Talent Cup ===
==== Races by year ====
(key) (Races in bold indicate pole position, races in italics indicate fastest lap)

Year	Bike	1	2	3	4	5	6	7	8	9	10	11	Pos	Pts
2017	Honda	ALB1; 3	ALB2; 2	**CAT**; 3	VAL1; Ret	**EST1**; 2	**EST2**; 1	JER1; 7	JER2; 7	**ARA1**; 4	**ARA2**; 5	VAL2; 5	1st	150

=== Supersport 300 World Championship ===
==== Races by year ====
(key) (Races in bold indicate pole position; races in italics indicate fastest lap)

Year	Bike	1	2	3	4	5	6	7	8	9	10	Pos	Pts
2017	Yamaha	SPA	NED	ITA	GBR	ITA	GER	POR	FRA	SPA; 34		NC	0
2018	Yamaha	SPA; Ret	NED; 9	ITA; Ret	GBR; 12	CZE; 33	ITA; 3	POR; 3	FRA; 3			6th	59
2019	Kawasaki	**SPA**; 1	NED; 1	ITA; C	SPA; 4	SPA; 1	**ITA**; 2	GBR; DNS	**POR**; 2	FRA; 2	QAT; 4	1st	161

=== Supersport World Championship ===
==== Races by year ====
(key) (Races in bold indicate pole position, races in italics indicate fastest lap)

Year	Bike	1		2		3		4		5		6		7		8		9		10		11		12		Pos	Pts
Year	Bike	R1	R2	R1	R2	R1	R2	R1	R2	R1	R2	R1	R2	R1	R2	R1	R2	R1	R2	R1	R2	R1	R2	R1	R2	Pos	Pts
2020	Kawasaki	AUS; 7		SPA; 8	SPA; 10	POR; 10	POR; 6	SPA; 8	SPA; 10	SPA; 6	SPA; 8	SPA; 7	SPA; 7	FRA; 7	FRA; 6	POR; 7	POR; 7									7th	126
2021	Yamaha	SPA; 5	SPA; 11	POR; 5	POR; 4	ITA; 5	ITA; 4	NED; 6	NED; 6	**CZE**; 2	**CZE**; 3	SPA; Ret	SPA; DNS	FRA; 4	FRA; 1	**SPA**; 2	**SPA**; 1	SPA; C	SPA; 4	POR; 2	POR; 4	ARG; 2	ARG; 10	INA; 5	INA; Ret	3rd	286

=== Grand Prix motorcycle racing ===
==== By season ====
Season	Class	Motorcycle	Team	Race	Win	Podium	Pole	FLap	Pts	Plcd
2021	Moto2	MV Agusta	MV Agusta Forward Team	2	0	0	0	0	0	33rd
2022	Moto2	Kalex	Yamaha VR46 Master Camp Team	19	0	0	0	0	76	16th
2023	Moto2	Kalex	Correos Prepago Yamaha VR46 Team	19	0	1	0	0	145.5	8th
2024	Moto2	Kalex	QJmotor Gresini Moto2	20	1	5	1	1	195	**3rd**
2025	Moto2	Kalex	Liqui Moly Dynavolt Intact GP	22	4	9	7	6	257	**2nd**
2026	Moto2	Kalex	Liqui Moly Dynavolt Intact GP	19	5	10	2	2	286.5*	**1st***
Total				**101**	**10**	**25**	**10**	**9**	**960**	

==== By class ====
Class	Seasons	1st GP	1st pod	1st win	Race	Win	Podiums	Pole	FLap	Pts	WChmp
Moto2	2021–present	2021 Netherlands	2023 Qatar	2024 Japan	101	10	25	10	9	960	0
Total	2021–present				**101**	**10**	**25**	**10**	**9**	**960**	**0**

==== Races by year ====
(key) (Races in bold indicate pole position; races in italics indicate fastest lap)

Year	Class	Bike	1	2	3	4	5	6	7	8	9	10	11	12	13	14	15	16	17	18	19	20	21	22	Pos	Pts
2021	Moto2	MV Agusta	QAT	DOH	POR	SPA	FRA	CAT	GER	NED; 22	STY	AUT	GBR	ARA; 17	RSM	AME	EMI	ALR	VAL						33rd	0
2022	Moto2	Kalex	QAT; 20	INA; 18	ARG; 14	AME; 13	POR; 5	SPA; 16	FRA; 11	ITA; 20	CAT; 9	GER; 12	NED; 9	GBR; 11	AUT; Ret	RSM; Ret	ARA; Ret	JPN; DNS	THA; 25	AUS; 5	MAL; 5	VAL; 6			16th	76
2023	Moto2	Kalex	POR; 5	ARG; 11	AME; 10	SPA; 12	FRA; DNS	ITA; 8	GER; 6	NED; 8	GBR; 5	AUT; Ret	CAT; 5	RSM; 7	IND; 5	JPN; 6	INA; 5	AUS; 13^{‡}	THA; 10	MAL; Ret	QAT; 2	VAL; 13			8th	145.5
2024	Moto2	Kalex	QAT; 5	**POR**; 3	AME; 13	SPA; 3	FRA; 24	CAT; 22	ITA; 2	NED; 9	GER; 12	GBR; 5	AUT; 13	ARA; 5	RSM; 4	EMI; 11	INA; 8	JPN; 1	AUS; 6	THA; 9	MAL; 11	SLD; 2			3rd	195
2025	Moto2	Kalex	**THA**; 1	**ARG**; 2	AME; 22	**QAT**; 3	**SPA**; 1	**FRA**; 1	GBR; Ret	ARA; 9	ITA; 1	NED; 3	GER; 4	CZE; 3	**AUT**; Ret	HUN; 3	CAT; 4	RSM; 6	**JPN**; 5	INA; DSQ	AUS; 7	MAL; 25	POR; 6	VAL; 22	2nd	257
2026	Moto2	Kalex	THA; 1^{‡}	BRA; 3	USA; 5	SPA; 2	FRA; 2	CAT; 1	**ITA**; 1	HUN; 1	CZE; 5	NED; 2	GER; 6	GBR; 14	ARA; 6	RSM; 1	AUT; 4	JPN; 22	INA; 2	**AUS**; C	MAL; 5	QAT; 6	POR; Ret	VAL	1st*	286.5*

^{‡} Half points awarded as less than half of the race distance (but at least three full laps) was completed.
* Season still in progress.
