= 2026 Moto2 European Championship =

Edition of a motorsport season

2026 FIM Moto2 European Championship
Previous:	2025	Next:	2027
Support series: FIM Moto3 Junior World Championship; Moto4 European Cup; FIM Stock European Championship

The 2026 FIM Moto2 European Championship was the seventeenth season of the class and the eleven under the FIM banner.

The season was held over 11 races over 7 meetings, beginning on 24 May at Catalunya and ending on 18 October at Misano.

== Calendar and results ==
The calendar was first revealed on 18 September 2025. The calendar was later updated on 12 November 2025

round	Date	Circuit	Pole position	Fastest lap	Race winner	Winning team
1	24 May	(Spain) Catalunya	(Spain) Eric Fernández	(Spain) Unai Orradre	(Poland) Milan Pawelec	(Spain) AGR Team
1	24 May	(Spain) Catalunya	(Spain) Eric Fernández	(Spain) Unai Orradre	(Italy) Dennis Foggia	(Italy) Team Ciatti - Boscoscuro
2	14 June	(Portugal) Estoril	(Spain) Unai Orradre	(Spain) Unai Orradre	(Poland) Milan Pawelec	(Spain) AGR Team
2	14 June	(Portugal) Estoril	(Spain) Unai Orradre	(Spain) Eric Fernández	(Spain) Eric Fernández	(Spain) Fau55 Tey Racing
3	5 July	(Spain) Jerez	(Spain) Eric Fernández	(Italy) Francesco Mongiardo	(Poland) Milan Pawelec	(Spain) AGR Team
4	26 July	(France) Magny-Cours	(Poland) Milan Pawelec	(Spain) Unai Orradre	(Poland) Milan Pawelec	(Spain) AGR Team
4	26 July	(France) Magny-Cours	(Poland) Milan Pawelec	(Poland) Milan Pawelec	(Poland) Milan Pawelec	(Spain) AGR Team
5	6 September	(Spain) Valencia	(Italy) Alessandro Morosi	(Italy) Francesco Mongiardo	(Poland) Milan Pawelec	(Spain) AGR Team
6	27 September	(Spain) Aragón	(Poland) Milan Pawelec	(Australia) Harrison Voight	(Italy) Alessandro Morosi	(Italy) Eagle–1
6	27 September	(Spain) Aragón	(Poland) Milan Pawelec	(Poland) Milan Pawelec	(Poland) Milan Pawelec	(Spain) AGR Team
7	18 October	(Italy) Misano	(Poland) Milan Pawelec	(Poland) Milan Pawelec	(Poland) Milan Pawelec	(Spain) AGR Team

== Entry List ==
The provisional entry list were announced on 13 February 2026. It was later updated on 23 March 2026

2026 entry list
Team	Constructor	No.	Rider	Rounds
(Italy) AC Racing Team	Boscoscuro	33	(Italy) Francesco Venturini	All
(Spain) Fau55 Tey Racing	Boscoscuro	4	(Spain) Eric Fernández	1–6
(Spain) Fau55 Tey Racing	Boscoscuro	8	(Spain) Marco Tapia	1–6
(Spain) GV EBC Racing	Boscoscuro	81	(Spain) Joan Santos	3
(Spain) GV EBC Racing	Boscoscuro	88	(Spain) Marcos Uriarte	1–4
(Italy) Team Ciatti - Boscoscuro	Boscoscuro	7	(Italy) Dennis Foggia	All
(Italy) Team Ciatti - Boscoscuro	Boscoscuro	12	(Australia) Jacob Roulstone	All
(Switzerland) Klint Junior Team Da Corsa	Forward	24	(Spain) Marcos Ramírez	3
(Switzerland) Klint Junior Team Da Corsa	Forward	82	(Italy) Stefano Nepa	1–2
(Spain) AGR Team	Kalex	20	(Netherlands) Owen van Trigt	All
(Spain) AGR Team	Kalex	26	(Australia) Jonathan Nahlous	All
(Spain) AGR Team	Kalex	44	(Poland) Milan Pawelec	All
(Spain) Cardoso Racing	Kalex	27	(United States) Max Toth	All
(Spain) Cardoso Racing	Kalex	29	(Australia) Harrison Voight	All
(Italy) Eagle–1 (Italy) REDS Eagle-1	Kalex	2	(Australia) Declan Van Rosmalen	All
(Italy) Eagle–1 (Italy) REDS Eagle-1	Kalex	19	(Italy) Alessandro Morosi	All
(Italy) Eagle–1 (Italy) REDS Eagle-1	Kalex	64	(Slovenia) Enej Krševan	All
(Italy) Eagle–1 (Italy) REDS Eagle-1	Kalex	77	(France) Johan Gimbert	3–5
(Germany) F.Koch Rennsport	Kalex	18	(Germany) Jona Eisenkolb	All
(Spain) JDO Racing Team	Kalex	61	(Spain) Javier del Olmo	All
(Spain) MDR Competición	Kalex	32	(Spain) Marcos Ludeña	1
(Spain) MDR Competición	Kalex	89	(Romania) Demis Mihaila	3–7
(Spain) MDR Competición	Kalex	99	(Sweden) Maxximus Vikingasköld	2
(Italy) MMR	Kalex	49	(Italy) Francesco Mongiardo	All
(Italy) MMR	Kalex	51	(Mexico) Juan Uriostegui	1–6
(Italy) MMR	Kalex	54	(Italy) Mattia Pasini	7
(Spain) Momoven Racing	Kalex	10	(Spain) Unai Orradre	All
(Spain) Promoracing Factory Team	Kalex	43	(United Kingdom) Amanuel Brinton	1–4, 6–7
(Hungary) Revesz Racing	Kalex	92	(Hungary) Rossi Moor	1–4
(Spain) SF Racing	Kalex	71	(Spain) Rubén Romero	All
(Spain) Team Estrella Galicia 0,0	Kalex	94	(Uruguay) Facundo Llambias	All
Team Stylobike Yamaha Philippines	Kalex	23	(Spain) David Réal	1, 3–7
Team Stylobike Yamaha Philippines	Kalex	57	(Spain) Javier Palomera	All
Team Stylobike Yamaha Philippines	Kalex	58	(Portugal) Pedro Romero	2
(Spain) Top Surface Aspar Team	Kalex	11	(Spain) Iker García	1–5
(Spain) Top Surface Aspar Team	Kalex	31	(Spain) Alberto García	7
(Spain) Top Surface Aspar Team	Kalex	32	(Spain) Marcos Ludeña	2–5
(Spain) Top Surface Aspar Team	Kalex	77	(France) Johan Gimbert	1
(Spain) Top Surface Aspar Team	Kalex	81	(Spain) Joan Santos	1

== Championship' standings ==
Scoring system

Points were awarded to the top fifteen finishers. Rider had to finish the race to earn points.

Position	1st	2nd	3rd	4th	5th	6th	7th	8th	9th	10th	11th	12th	13th	14th	15th
Points	25	20	16	13	11	10	9	8	7	6	5	4	3	2	1

=== Riders' championship ===
Pos.	Rider	Bike	CAT (Spain)		EST (Portugal)		JER (Spain)	MAG (France)		VAL (Spain)	ARA (Spain)		MIS (Italy)	Points
1	(Poland) Milan Pawelec	Kalex	1	3	1	9	1	1^{P}	1^{P}^{F}	1	Ret^{P}	1^{P}^{F}	1^{P}^{F}	223
2	(Spain) Unai Orradre	Kalex	2^{F}	2^{F}	3^{P}^{F}	2^{P}	3	2^{F}	2	DSQ	3	2	6	178
3	(Italy) Alessandro Morosi	Kalex	4	6	7	6	6	3	3	3^{P}	1	6	4	148
4	(Italy) Francesco Mongiardo	Kalex	3	8	4	4	2^{F}	6	8	4^{F}	6	5	2	142
5	(Italy) Dennis Foggia	Boscoscuro	6	1	6	3	15	7	9	5	8	9	10	110
6	(Australia) Harrison Voight	Kalex	8	9	5	12	14	4	5	2	2^{F}	4	Ret	109
7	(Spain) Eric Fernández	Boscoscuro	11^{P}	5^{P}	2	1^{F}	4^{P}	5	4	Ret	Ret	DNS		98
8	(Uruguay) Facundo Llambias	Kalex	18	Ret	Ret	5	10	11	12	6	4	8	3	73
9	(Spain) Javier Palomera	Kalex	5	4	Ret	Ret	8	8	6	Ret	7	Ret	7	68
10	(Australia) Jacob Roulstone	Boscoscuro	7	7	Ret	Ret	5	12	10	Ret	5	3	Ret	66
11	(Hungary) Rossi Moor	Forward	13	10	9	8	7	9	7					49
12	(Spain) Marcos Ludeña	Kalex	14	12	8	7	11	20	14	9				37
13	(Italy) Francesco Venturini	Boscoscuro	16	17	Ret	11	9	Ret	13	Ret	12	10	5	36
14	(Spain) David Réal	Kalex	Ret	Ret			17	19	20	7	9	DNS	9	23
15	(Spain) Rubén Romero	Kalex	Ret	14	15	20	Ret	22	21	10	13	7	WD	21
16	(United States) Max Toth	Kalex	22	21	14	16	Ret	18	17	Ret	10	11	8	21
17	(Spain) Marco Tapia	Boscoscuro	Ret	Ret	10	14	12	15	16	8	17	DNS		21
18	(Australia) Jonathan Nahlous	Kalex	12	13	11	13	18	16	18	Ret	11	17	WD	20
19	(Slovenia) Enej Krševan	Kalex	WD	WD	12	15	16	10	11	Ret	14	Ret	Ret	18
20	(Spain) Iker García	Kalex	Ret	DNS	13	10	19	13	Ret	11				17
21	(France) Johan Gimbert	Kalex	9	11			Ret	17	Ret	12				16
22	(United Kingdom) Amanuel Brinton	Kalex	Ret	Ret	Ret	Ret	13	14	15		16	13	13	12
23	(Romania) Demis Mihaila	Kalex					22	21	19	14	15	12	12	11
24	(Netherlands) Owen van Trigt	Kalex	20	20	16	18	Ret	26	23	13	18	14	11	10
25	(Italy) Stefano Nepa	Forward	10	15	Ret	Ret								7
26	(Australia) Declan Van Rosmalen	Kalex	21	22	18	21	21	24	Ret	Ret	19	15	14	3
27	(Spain) Javier del Olmo	Kalex	23	23	19	23	23	27	25	15	20	16	15	2
28	(Spain) Joan Santos	Kalex	15	16										1
28	(Spain) Joan Santos	Boscoscuro					Ret							1
29	(Germany) Jona Eisenkolb	Kalex	24	24	21	24	24	Ret	26	16	21	18	Ret	0
30	(Spain) Marcos Uriarte	Boscoscuro	17	18	NC	17	20	25	22					0
31	(Mexico) Juan Uriostegui	Kalex	19	19	17	19	Ret	23	24	Ret	WD	WD		0
32	(Portugal) Pedro Romero	Kalex			20	22								0
33	(Sweden) Maxximus Vikingasköld	Kalex			22	25								0
	(Spain) Alberto García	Kalex											Ret	0
	(Spain) Marcos Ramírez	Forward					DNS							
	(Italy) Mattia Pasini	Kalex											WD	
Pos.	Rider	Bike	CAT (Spain)		EST (Portugal)		JER (Spain)	MAG (France)		VAL (Spain)	ARA (Spain)		MIS (Italy)	Points

Colour	Result
Gold	Winner
Silver	Second place
Bronze	Third place
Green	Points classification
Blue	Non-points classification
Blue	Non-classified finish (NC)
Purple	Retired, not classified (Ret)
Red	Did not qualify (DNQ)
Red	Did not pre-qualify (DNPQ)
Black	Disqualified (DSQ)
White	Did not start (DNS)
White	Withdrew (WD)
White	Race cancelled (C)
Blank	Did not practice (DNP)
Blank	Did not arrive (DNA)
Blank	Excluded (EX)

P – Pole position
F – Fastest lap
