= 2026 Catalan motorcycle Grand Prix =

Motorcycle races in Montmeló

(Catalonia) 2026 Catalan Grand Prix
Race details
- Race 6 of 22 races in the 2026 Grand Prix motorcycle racing season
- Date: 17 May 2026
- Official name: Monster Energy Grand Prix of Catalunya
- Location: Circuit de Barcelona-Catalunya; Montmeló, Spain
- Course: Permanent racing facility; 4.657 km (2.894 mi)

MotoGP
Pole position
Rider	(Spain) Pedro Acosta	KTM
Time	1:38.068	
Fastest lap
Rider	(Italy) Fabio Di Giannantonio	Ducati
Time	1:39.736 on lap 2	
Podium
First	(Italy) Fabio Di Giannantonio	Ducati
Second	(Spain) Fermín Aldeguer	Ducati
Third	(Italy) Francesco Bagnaia	Ducati

Moto2
Pole position
Rider	(Italy) Celestino Vietti	Boscoscuro
Time	1:41.076	
Fastest lap
Rider	(Italy) Celestino Vietti	Boscoscuro
Time	1:41.943 on lap 4	
Podium
First	(Spain) Manuel González	Kalex
Second	(Italy) Celestino Vietti	Boscoscuro
Third	(Spain) Izan Guevara	Boscoscuro

Moto3
Pole position
Rider	(Argentina) Valentín Perrone	KTM
Time	1:46.679	
Fastest lap
Rider	(Spain) David Almansa	KTM
Time	1:47.252 on lap 11	
Podium
First	(Spain) Máximo Quiles	KTM
Second	(Spain) Álvaro Carpe	KTM
Third	(Spain) David Muñoz	KTM

The 2026 Catalan motorcycle Grand Prix (officially known as the Monster Energy Grand Prix of Catalunya) was the sixth round of the 2026 Grand Prix motorcycle racing season. All races were held at the Circuit de Barcelona-Catalunya in Montmeló on 17 May 2026.

== MotoGP Sprint ==
The MotoGP Sprint was held on 16 May 2026.

Pos.	No.	Rider	Team	Manufacturer	Laps	Time/Retired	Grid	Points
1	73	(Spain) Álex Márquez	BK8 Gresini Racing MotoGP	Ducati	12	20:02.258	3	12
2	37	(Spain) Pedro Acosta	Red Bull KTM Factory Racing	KTM	12	+0.041	1	9
3	49	(Italy) Fabio Di Giannantonio	Pertamina Enduro VR46 Racing Team	Ducati	12	+0.457	6	7
4	25	(Spain) Raúl Fernández	Trackhouse MotoGP Team	Aprilia	12	+2.928	4	6
5	5	(France) Johann Zarco	Castrol Honda LCR	Honda	12	+4.764	5	5
6	63	(Italy) Francesco Bagnaia	Ducati Lenovo Team	Ducati	12	+4.894	13	4
7	21	(Italy) Franco Morbidelli	Pertamina Enduro VR46 Racing Team	Ducati	12	+6.175	2	3
8	79	(Japan) Ai Ogura	Trackhouse MotoGP Team	Aprilia	12	+6.871	18	2
9	72	(Italy) Marco Bezzecchi	Aprilia Racing	Aprilia	12	+7.381	12	1
10	23	(Italy) Enea Bastianini	Red Bull KTM Tech3	KTM	12	+7.869	14	
11	10	(Italy) Luca Marini	Honda HRC Castrol	Honda	12	+8.343	16	
12	54	(Spain) Fermín Aldeguer	BK8 Gresini Racing MotoGP	Ducati	12	+9.721	15	
13	20	(France) Fabio Quartararo	Monster Energy Yamaha MotoGP Team	Yamaha	12	+10.042	7	
14	11	(Brazil) Diogo Moreira	Pro Honda LCR	Honda	12	+14.096	20	
15	42	(Spain) Álex Rins	Monster Energy Yamaha MotoGP Team	Yamaha	12	+14.166	19	
16	43	(Australia) Jack Miller	Prima Pramac Yamaha MotoGP	Yamaha	12	+14.334	11	
17	7	(Turkey) Toprak Razgatlıoğlu	Prima Pramac Yamaha MotoGP	Yamaha	12	+20.452	22	
18	47	(Spain) Augusto Fernández	Yamaha Factory Racing	Yamaha	12	+20.558	21	
Ret	12	(Spain) Maverick Viñales	Red Bull KTM Tech3	KTM	6	Technical	17	
Ret	89	(Spain) Jorge Martín	Aprilia Racing	Aprilia	2	Accident	9	
Ret	36	(Spain) Joan Mir	Honda HRC Castrol	Honda	0	Collision	10	
Ret	33	(South Africa) Brad Binder	Red Bull KTM Factory Racing	KTM	0	Collision	8	
Fastest sprint lap: (Spain) Álex Márquez (Ducati) - 1:39.209 (lap 2)
Official MotoGP Sprint Report

== Race ==
=== MotoGP ===
The race was originally scheduled to run 24 laps but was red-flagged on lap 12 following an accident involving Álex Márquez. It was restarted over 13 laps but another red flag was shown after a multi-rider accident at turn 1 involving Johann Zarco. Ultimately, the race resumed once more with 12 laps remaining.

Pos.	No.	Rider	Team	Manufacturer	Laps	Time/Retired	Grid	Points
1	49	(Italy) Fabio Di Giannantonio	Pertamina Enduro VR46 Racing Team	Ducati	12	20:06.243	4	25
2	54	(Spain) Fermín Aldeguer	BK8 Gresini Racing MotoGP	Ducati	12	+1.466	8	20
3	63	(Italy) Francesco Bagnaia	Ducati Lenovo Team	Ducati	12	+4.320	10	16
4	72	(Italy) Marco Bezzecchi	Aprilia Racing	Aprilia	12	+4.679	12	13
5	20	(France) Fabio Quartararo	Monster Energy Yamaha MotoGP Team	Yamaha	12	+4.876	13	11
6	10	(Italy) Luca Marini	Honda HRC Castrol	Honda	12	+4.971	9	10
7	33	(South Africa) Brad Binder	Red Bull KTM Factory Racing	KTM	12	+5.137	20	9
8	79	(Japan) Ai Ogura	Trackhouse MotoGP Team	Aprilia	12	+5.377 (Note: 3-second penalty for causing an accident.)	11	8
9	11	(Brazil) Diogo Moreira	Pro Honda LCR	Honda	12	+6.839	14	7
10	21	(Italy) Franco Morbidelli	Pertamina Enduro VR46 Racing Team	Ducati	12	+7.160	6	6
11	12	(Spain) Maverick Viñales	Red Bull KTM Tech3	KTM	12	+10.147	15	5
12	47	(Spain) Augusto Fernández	Yamaha Factory Racing	Yamaha	12	+16.245	19	4
13	36	(Spain) Joan Mir	Honda HRC Castrol	Honda	12	+17.250 (Note: 16-second penalty due to low tyre pressure.)	7	3
14	42	(Spain) Álex Rins	Monster Energy Yamaha MotoGP Team	Yamaha	12	+22.916	17	2
15	43	(Australia) Jack Miller	Prima Pramac Yamaha MotoGP	Yamaha	12	+26.452	16	1
16	7	(Turkey) Toprak Razgatlıoğlu	Prima Pramac Yamaha MotoGP	Yamaha	12	+27.808	18	
17	25	(Spain) Raúl Fernández	Trackhouse MotoGP Team	Aprilia	12	+31.066	2	
NC (Note: Finished the race through the pit lane)	89	(Spain) Jorge Martín	Aprilia Racing	Aprilia	12	+58.592	3	
Ret	37	(Spain) Pedro Acosta	Red Bull KTM Factory Racing	KTM	11	Collision	1	
Ret	5	(France) Johann Zarco	Castrol Honda LCR	Honda		Did not restart		
Ret	73	(Spain) Álex Márquez	BK8 Gresini Racing MotoGP	Ducati		Did not restart		
Ret	23	(Italy) Enea Bastianini	Red Bull KTM Tech3	KTM		Did not restart		
Fastest lap: (Italy) Fabio Di Giannantonio (Ducati) – 1:39.736 (lap 2)
Official MotoGP Race Report

=== Moto2 ===
Pos.	No.	Rider	Team	Manufacturer	Laps	Time/Retired	Grid	Points
1	18	(Spain) Manuel González	Liqui Moly Dynavolt Intact GP	Kalex	21	+36:06.295	3	25
2	13	(Italy) Celestino Vietti	Beta Tools SpeedRS Team	Boscoscuro	21	+0.203	1	20
3	28	(Spain) Izan Guevara	Blu Cru Pramac Yamaha Moto2	Boscoscuro	21	+4.205	11	16
4	4	(Spain) Iván Ortolá	QJMotor – Bordoy – MSi	Kalex	21	+6.338	4	13
5	96	(Spain) Daniel Holgado	CFMoto Impulse Aspar Team	Kalex	21	+7.971	8	11
6	80	(Colombia) David Alonso	CFMoto Impulse Aspar Team	Kalex	21	+8.080	13	10
7	12	(Czech Republic) Filip Salač	OnlyFans American Racing Team	Kalex	21	+9.636	7	9
8	21	(Spain) Alonso López	Italjet Gresini Moto2	Kalex	21	+11.312	5	8
9	32	(Italy) Luca Lunetta	Beta Tools SpeedRS Team	Boscoscuro	21	+13.545	10	7
10	81	(Australia) Senna Agius	Liqui Moly Dynavolt Intact GP	Kalex	21	+13.761	12	6
11	17	(Spain) Daniel Muñoz	Italtrans Racing Team	Kalex	21	+14.210	15	5
12	98	(Spain) José Antonio Rueda	Red Bull KTM Ajo	Kalex	21	+15.056	9	4
13	7	(Belgium) Barry Baltus	Reds Fantic Racing	Kalex	21	+16.423	21	3
14	44	(Spain) Arón Canet	Elf Marc VDS Racing Team	Boscoscuro	21	+17.667	6	2
15	71	(Japan) Ayumu Sasaki	Momoven Idrofoglia RW Racing Team	Kalex	21	+18.721	14	1
16	10	(Spain) Unai Orradre	QJMotor – Bordoy – MSi	Kalex	21	+20.730	22	
17	14	(Italy) Tony Arbolino	Reds Fantic Racing	Kalex	21	+21.344	24	
18	54	(Spain) Alberto Ferrández	Blu Cru Pramac Yamaha Moto2	Boscoscuro	21	+21.405	17	
19	84	(Netherlands) Zonta van den Goorbergh	Momoven Idrofoglia RW Racing Team	Kalex	21	+24.078	19	
20	72	(Japan) Taiyo Furusato	Honda Team Asia	Kalex	21	+24.833	23	
21	99	(Spain) Adrián Huertas	Italtrans Racing Team	Kalex	21	+31.147	26	
22	53	(Turkey) Deniz Öncü	Elf Marc VDS Racing Team	Boscoscuro	21	+38.957	16	
23	3	(Spain) Sergio García	Italjet Gresini Moto2	Kalex	21	+39.601	20	
24	85	(Spain) Xabi Zurutuza	Klint Racing Team	Forward	21	+49.140	27	
Ret	95	(Netherlands) Collin Veijer	Red Bull KTM Ajo	Kalex	16	Accident	2	
Ret	16	(United States) Joe Roberts	OnlyFans American Racing Team	Kalex	13	Technical	25	
Ret	11	(Spain) Álex Escrig	Klint Racing Team	Forward	10	Injury	18	
Fastest lap: (Italy) Celestino Vietti (Boscoscuro) – 1:41.943 (lap 4)
Official Moto2 Race Report

=== Moto3 ===
Pos.	No.	Rider	Team	Manufacturer	Laps	Time/Retired	Grid	Points
1	28	(Spain) Máximo Quiles	CFMoto Gaviota Aspar Team	KTM	18	32:28.964	7	25
2	83	(Spain) Álvaro Carpe	Red Bull KTM Ajo	KTM	18	+0.094	13	20
3	64	(Spain) David Muñoz	Liqui Moly Dynavolt Intact GP	KTM	18	+0.098	2	16
4	22	(Spain) David Almansa	Liqui Moly Dynavolt Intact GP	KTM	18	+0.552	4	13
5	97	(Argentina) Marco Morelli	CFMoto Gaviota Aspar Team	KTM	18	+0.581	5	11
6	13	(Malaysia) Hakim Danish	Aeon Credit – MT Helmets – MSi	KTM	18	+0.623	10	10
7	9	(Indonesia) Veda Pratama	Honda Team Asia	Honda	18	+0.984	20	9
8	31	(Spain) Adrián Fernández (Note: Originally finished eighth but was disqualified from the first six races of the season for engine tampering. However, his team Leopard Racing appealed the disqualification and won the appeal verdict, thus reinstating his results in the first six races.)	Leopard Racing	Honda	18	+1.011	9	8
9	67	(Republic of Ireland) Casey O'Gorman	Sic58 Squadra Corse	Honda	18	+1.151	24	7
10	8	(United Kingdom) Eddie O'Shea	Gryd – MLav Racing	Honda	18	+5.236	15	6
11	73	(Argentina) Valentín Perrone	Red Bull KTM Tech3	KTM	18	+9.805	1	5
12	11	(Spain) Adrián Cruces	CIP Green Power	KTM	18	+9.853	19	4
13	18	(Italy) Matteo Bertelle	LevelUp – MTA	KTM	18	+9.909	12	3
14	6	(Japan) Ryusei Yamanaka	Aeon Credit – MT Helmets – MSi	KTM	18	+9.951	17	2
15	78	(Spain) Joel Esteban	LevelUp – MTA	KTM	18	+10.008	11	1
16	27	(Finland) Rico Salmela	Red Bull KTM Tech3	KTM	18	+10.074	14	
17	66	(Australia) Joel Kelso	Gryd – MLav Racing	Honda	18	+10.785	8	
18	19	(United Kingdom) Scott Ogden	CIP Green Power	KTM	18	+18.949	18	
19	21	(South Africa) Ruché Moodley	Code Motorsports	KTM	18	+20.287	21	
20	94	(Italy) Guido Pini	Leopard Racing	Honda	18	+21.969	16	
21	32	(Japan) Zen Mitani	Honda Team Asia	Honda	18	+27.942	23	
22	5	(Austria) Leo Rammerstorfer	Sic58 Squadra Corse	Honda	18	+27.991	25	
23	14	(New Zealand) Cormac Buchanan	Code Motorsports	KTM	18	+40.082	26	
Ret	54	(Spain) Jesús Ríos	Rivacold Snipers Team	Honda	16	Accident	6	
Ret	10	(Italy) Nicola Carraro	Rivacold Snipers Team	Honda	4	Accident	22	
DSQ	51	(Spain) Brian Uriarte	Red Bull KTM Ajo	KTM		Disqualified (Note: Originally finished fourth, but disqualified for technical infringement after having used non-approved engine oil in qualifying and race.)		
Fastest lap: (Spain) David Almansa (KTM) – 1:47.252 (lap 11)
Official Moto3 Race Report

== Championship standings after the race ==
Below are the standings for the top five riders, constructors, and teams after the round.

=== MotoGP ===
Riders' Championship standings

Pos.	Rider	Points
1	(Italy) Marco Bezzecchi	142
2	(Spain) Jorge Martín	127
3	(Italy) Fabio Di Giannantonio	116
4	(Spain) Pedro Acosta	92
5	(Japan) Ai Ogura	77

Constructors' Championship standings

Pos.	Constructor	Points
1	(Italy) Aprilia	181
2	(Italy) Ducati	165
3	(Austria) KTM	114
4	(Japan) Honda	64
5	(Japan) Yamaha	40

Teams' Championship standings

	Pos.	Team	Points
	1	(Italy) Aprilia Racing	269
2	2	(Italy) Pertamina Enduro VR46 Racing Team	152
1	3	(United States) Trackhouse MotoGP Team	145
1	4	(Austria) Red Bull KTM Factory Racing	129
	5	(Italy) Ducati Lenovo Team	120

=== Moto2 ===
Riders' Championship standings

	Pos.	Rider	Points
	1	(Spain) Manuel González	104.5
	2	(Spain) Izan Guevara	86
1	3	(Italy) Celestino Vietti	73
1	4	(Australia) Senna Agius	65
	5	(Colombia) David Alonso	58

Constructors' Championship standings

Pos.	Constructor	Points
1	(Germany) Kalex	132.5
2	(Italy) Boscoscuro	96
3	(Switzerland) Forward	30

Teams' Championship standings

	Pos.	Team	Points
	1	(Germany) Liqui Moly Dynavolt Intact GP	169.5
	2	(Spain) CFMoto Impulse Aspar Team	107
	3	(Italy) Blu Cru Pramac Yamaha Moto2	87.5
	4	(Italy) Beta Tools SpeedRS Team	80
1	5	(Spain) QJMotor – Bordoy – MSi	52.5

=== Moto3 ===
Riders' Championship standings

	Pos.	Rider	Points
	1	(Spain) Máximo Quiles	140
	2	(Spain) Adrián Fernández	77
	3	(Spain) Álvaro Carpe	73
2	4	(Argentina) Marco Morelli	59
	5	(Indonesia) Veda Pratama	59

Constructors' Championship standings

Pos.	Constructor	Points
1	(Austria) KTM	145
2	(Japan) Honda	101

Teams' Championship standings

	Pos.	Team	Points
	1	(Spain) CFMoto Gaviota Aspar Team	199
	2	(Luxembourg) Leopard Racing	123
	3	(Finland) Red Bull KTM Ajo	102
1	4	(Germany) Liqui Moly Dynavolt Intact GP	93
1	5	(France) Red Bull KTM Tech3	78

== Notes ==
Previous race: 2026 French Grand Prix	FIM Grand Prix World Championship; 2026 season	Next race: 2026 Italian Grand Prix
Previous race: 2025 Catalan Grand Prix	Catalan motorcycle Grand Prix	Next race: 2027 Catalan Grand Prix
