= 2026 British motorcycle Grand Prix =

Motorcycle races in Silverstone

(United Kingdom) 2026 British Grand Prix
Race details
- Race 12 of 22 races in the 2026 Grand Prix motorcycle racing season
- Date: 9 August 2026
- Official name: Qatar Airways Grand Prix of Great Britain
- Location: Silverstone Circuit; Silverstone, United Kingdom
- Course: Permanent racing facility; 5.900 km (3.666 mi)

MotoGP
Pole position
Rider	(Spain) Jorge Martín	Aprilia
Time	1:56.160	
Fastest lap
Rider	(Spain) Raúl Fernández	Aprilia
Time	1:58.457 on lap 2	
Podium
First	(Spain) Raúl Fernández	Aprilia
Second	(Spain) Jorge Martín	Aprilia
Third	(Italy) Marco Bezzecchi	Aprilia

Moto2
Pole position
Rider	(Spain) Izan Guevara	Boscoscuro
Time	2:01.483	
Fastest lap
Rider	(Italy) Tony Arbolino	Kalex
Time	2:02.682 on lap 7	
Podium
First	(Czech Republic) Filip Salač	Kalex
Second	(Spain) Iván Ortolá	Kalex
Third	(Spain) Álex Escrig	Forward

Moto3
Pole position
Rider	(United Kingdom) Scott Ogden	KTM
Time	2:09.126	
Fastest lap
Rider	(Spain) Álvaro Carpe	KTM
Time	2:10.199 on lap 10	
Podium
First	(Spain) David Almansa	KTM
Second	(Spain) Álvaro Carpe	KTM
Third	(Argentina) Valentín Perrone	KTM

The 2026 British motorcycle Grand Prix (officially known as the Qatar Airways Grand Prix of Great Britain) was the twelfth round of the 2026 Grand Prix motorcycle racing season. All races were held at the Silverstone Circuit in Silverstone on 9 August 2026.

== MotoGP Sprint ==
The MotoGP Sprint was held on 8 August 2026.

Pos.	No.	Rider	Team	Manufacturer	Laps	Time/Retired	Grid	Points
1	89	(Spain) Jorge Martín	Aprilia Racing	Aprilia	10	19:49.066	1	12
2	79	(Japan) Ai Ogura	SuperFile Trackhouse MotoGP Team	Aprilia	10	+1.530	3	9
3	72	(Italy) Marco Bezzecchi	Aprilia Racing	Aprilia	10	+3.974	5	7
4	73	(Spain) Álex Márquez	BK8 Gresini Racing MotoGP	Ducati	10	+6.956	7	6
5	49	(Italy) Fabio Di Giannantonio	Pertamina Enduro VR46 Racing Team	Ducati	10	+8.651	4	5
6	37	(Spain) Pedro Acosta	Red Bull KTM Factory Racing	KTM	10	+10.745	9	4
7	36	(Spain) Joan Mir	Honda HRC Castrol	Honda	10	+10.826	12	3
8	21	(Italy) Franco Morbidelli	Pertamina Enduro VR46 Racing Team	Ducati	10	+12.539	8	2
9	93	(Spain) Marc Márquez	Ducati Lenovo Team	Ducati	10	+13.965	6	1
10	11	(Brazil) Diogo Moreira	Pro Honda LCR	Honda	10	+13.992	14	
11	33	(South Africa) Brad Binder	Red Bull KTM Factory Racing	KTM	10	+14.142	18	
12	10	(Italy) Luca Marini	Honda HRC Castrol	Honda	10	+14.344	15	
13	43	(Australia) Jack Miller	Prima Pramac Yamaha MotoGP	Yamaha	10	+14.540	11	
14	20	(France) Fabio Quartararo	Monster Energy Yamaha MotoGP Team	Yamaha	10	+15.213	13	
15	23	(Italy) Enea Bastianini	Red Bull KTM Tech3	KTM	10	+16.892	19	
16	42	(Spain) Álex Rins	Monster Energy Yamaha MotoGP Team	Yamaha	10	+20.194	17	
17	63	(Italy) Francesco Bagnaia	Ducati Lenovo Team	Ducati	10	+23.722	16	
18	44	(Spain) Pol Espargaró	Red Bull KTM Tech3	KTM	10	+24.380	21	
19	47	(Spain) Augusto Fernández	Yamaha Factory Racing	Yamaha	10	+27.593	23	
20	7	(Turkey) Toprak Razgatlıoğlu	Prima Pramac Yamaha MotoGP	Yamaha	10	+34.332	22	
Ret	25	(Spain) Raúl Fernández	SuperFile Trackhouse MotoGP Team	Aprilia	5	Accident damage	2	
Ret	35	(United Kingdom) Cal Crutchlow	Castrol Honda LCR	Honda	3	Accident damage	20	
Ret	27	(Spain) Iker Lecuona	BK8 Gresini Racing MotoGP	Ducati	0	Accident	10	
Fastest sprint lap: (Spain) Jorge Martín (Aprilia) - (lap 4)
Official MotoGP Sprint Report

== Race ==
=== MotoGP ===
Pos.	No.	Rider	Team	Manufacturer	Laps	Time/Retired	Grid	Points
1	25	(Spain) Raúl Fernández	SuperFile Trackhouse MotoGP Team	Aprilia	20	39:45.930	2	25
2	89	(Spain) Jorge Martín	Aprilia Racing	Aprilia	20	+2.538	1	20
3	72	(Italy) Marco Bezzecchi	Aprilia Racing	Aprilia	20	+3.393	5	16
4	73	(Spain) Álex Márquez	BK8 Gresini Racing MotoGP	Ducati	20	+4.702	7	13
5	37	(Spain) Pedro Acosta	Red Bull KTM Factory Racing	KTM	20	+6.256	9	11
6	49	(Italy) Fabio Di Giannantonio	Pertamina Enduro VR46 Racing Team	Ducati	20	+6.382	4	10
7	93	(Spain) Marc Márquez	Ducati Lenovo Team	Ducati	20	+9.550	6	9
8	33	(South Africa) Brad Binder	Red Bull KTM Factory Racing	KTM	20	+22.288	18	8
9	10	(Italy) Luca Marini	Honda HRC Castrol	Honda	20	+23.845	15	7
10	11	(Brazil) Diogo Moreira	Pro Honda LCR	Honda	20	+25.411	14	6
11	21	(Italy) Franco Morbidelli	Pertamina Enduro VR46 Racing Team	Ducati	20	+26.301	8	5
12	43	(Australia) Jack Miller	Prima Pramac Yamaha MotoGP	Yamaha	20	+29.458	11	4
13	44	(Spain) Pol Espargaró	Red Bull KTM Tech3	KTM	20	+41.310	21	3
14	7	(Turkey) Toprak Razgatlıoğlu	Prima Pramac Yamaha MotoGP	Yamaha	20	+41.492	22	2
15	47	(Spain) Augusto Fernández	Yamaha Factory Racing	Yamaha	20	+42.379	23	1
16	20	(France) Fabio Quartararo	Monster Energy Yamaha MotoGP Team	Yamaha	20	+42.883 (Note: 16-second penalty due to low tyre pressure.)	13	
Ret	79	(Japan) Ai Ogura	SuperFile Trackhouse MotoGP Team	Aprilia	8	Accident	3	
Ret	63	(Italy) Francesco Bagnaia	Ducati Lenovo Team	Ducati	7	Accident	16	
Ret	35	(United Kingdom) Cal Crutchlow	Castrol Honda LCR	Honda	6	Accident	20	
Ret	27	(Spain) Iker Lecuona	BK8 Gresini Racing MotoGP	Ducati	5	Accident	10	
Ret	23	(Italy) Enea Bastianini	Red Bull KTM Tech3	KTM	4	Accident	19	
Ret	42	(Spain) Álex Rins	Monster Energy Yamaha MotoGP Team	Yamaha	1	Collision damage	17	
Ret	36	(Spain) Joan Mir	Honda HRC Castrol	Honda	0	Collision	12	
Fastest lap: (Spain) Raúl Fernández (Aprilia) – 1:58.457 (lap 2)
Official MotoGP Race Report

=== Moto2 ===
Pos.	No.	Rider	Team	Manufacturer	Laps	Time/Retired	Grid	Points
1	12	(Czech Republic) Filip Salač	OnlyFans American Racing Team	Kalex	17	35:01.869	6	25
2	4	(Spain) Iván Ortolá	QJMotor – Biolec – MSi	Kalex	17	+0.303	3	20
3	11	(Spain) Álex Escrig	Klint Racing Team	Forward	17	+0.652	8	16
4	96	(Spain) Daniel Holgado	CFMoto Gaviota Aspar Team	Kalex	17	+1.743	7	13
5	28	(Spain) Izan Guevara	Blu Cru Pramac Yamaha Moto2	Boscoscuro	17	+2.555	1	11
6	21	(Spain) Alonso López	Italjet Gresini Moto2	Kalex	17	+6.201	2	10
7	17	(Spain) Daniel Muñoz	Italtrans Racing Team	Kalex	17	+6.293	5	9
8	53	(Turkey) Deniz Öncü	Elf Marc VDS Racing Team	Boscoscuro	17	+7.185	21	8
9	7	(Belgium) Barry Baltus	Reds Fantic Racing	Kalex	17	+7.310	14	7
10	3	(Spain) Sergio García	Italjet Gresini Moto2	Kalex	17	+8.873	16	6
11	71	(Japan) Ayumu Sasaki	Momoven Idrofoglia RW Racing Team	Kalex	17	+9.066	10	5
12	13	(Italy) Celestino Vietti	GT Trevisan SpeedRS Team	Boscoscuro	17	+13.722	12	4
13	16	(United States) Joe Roberts	OnlyFans American Racing Team	Kalex	17	+13.822	9	3
14	18	(Spain) Manuel González	Liqui Moly Dynavolt Intact GP	Kalex	17	+15.207	4	2
15	54	(Spain) Alberto Ferrández	Blu Cru Pramac Yamaha Moto2	Boscoscuro	17	+15.210	20	1
16	32	(Italy) Luca Lunetta	GT Trevisan SpeedRS Team	Boscoscuro	17	+18.641	24	
17	36	(Spain) Ángel Piqueras	QJMotor – Biolec – MSi	Kalex	17	+18.695	25	
18	99	(Spain) Adrián Huertas	Italtrans Racing Team	Kalex	17	+18.849	22	
19	98	(Spain) José Antonio Rueda	Red Bull KTM Ajo	KTM	17	+18.987	23	
20	81	(Australia) Senna Agius	Liqui Moly Dynavolt Intact GP	Kalex	17	+19.393	11	
21	80	(Colombia) David Alonso	CFMoto Gaviota Aspar Team	Kalex	17	+20.176	19	
22	64	(Indonesia) Mario Aji	Idemitsu Honda Team Asia	Kalex	17	+21.470	18	
23	72	(Japan) Taiyo Furusato	Idemitsu Honda Team Asia	Kalex	17	+22.507	28	
24	84	(Netherlands) Zonta van den Goorbergh	Momoven Idrofoglia RW Racing Team	Kalex	17	+22.628	17	
25	85	(Spain) Xabi Zurutuza	Klint Racing Team	Forward	17	+27.830	27	
Ret	14	(Italy) Tony Arbolino	Reds Fantic Racing	Kalex	12	Accident	13	
Ret	44	(Spain) Arón Canet	Elf Marc VDS Racing Team	Boscoscuro	8	Accident	26	
Ret	95	(Netherlands) Collin Veijer	Red Bull KTM Ajo	KTM	0	Collision	15	
Fastest lap: (Italy) Tony Arbolino (Kalex) – 2:02.682 (lap 7)
Official Moto2 Race Report

=== Moto3 ===
Pos.	No.	Rider	Team	Manufacturer	Laps	Time/Retired	Grid	Points
1	22	(Spain) David Almansa	Liqui Moly Dynavolt Intact GP	KTM	15	32:45.262	4	25
2	83	(Spain) Álvaro Carpe	Red Bull KTM Ajo	KTM	15	+0.701	5	20
3	73	(Argentina) Valentín Perrone	Red Bull KTM Tech3	KTM	15	+0.991	3	16
4	31	(Spain) Adrián Fernández	Leopard Racing	Honda	15	+1.111	6	13
5	78	(Spain) Joel Esteban	LevelUp – MTA	KTM	15	+3.743	12	11
6	66	(Australia) Joel Kelso	Gryd Racing	Honda	15	+11.614	10	10
7	27	(Finland) Rico Salmela	Red Bull KTM Tech3	KTM	15	+11.759	18	9
8	8	(United Kingdom) Eddie O'Shea	Gryd Racing	Honda	15	+11.818	14	8
9	9	(Indonesia) Veda Pratama	Honda Team Asia	Honda	15	+12.276	15	7
10	18	(Italy) Matteo Bertelle	LevelUp – MTA	KTM	15	+12.351	16	6
11	54	(Spain) Jesús Ríos	Rivacold Snipers Team	Honda	15	+22.415	20	5
12	67	(Republic of Ireland) Casey O'Gorman	Sic58 Squadra Corse	Honda	15	+22.463	17	4
13	94	(Italy) Guido Pini	Leopard Racing	Honda	15	+22.847	21	3
14	71	(Spain) David González	Liqui Moly Dynavolt Intact GP	KTM	15	+22.895	19	2
15	85	(Thailand) Kiattisak Singhapong	Honda Team Asia	Honda	15	+35.339	22	1
16	97	(Argentina) Marco Morelli	CFMoto Valresa Aspar Team	KTM	15	+35.419	13	
17	5	(Austria) Leo Rammerstofer	Sic58 Squadra Corse	Honda	15	+47.382	24	
18	25	(Italy) Leonardo Abruzzo	Code Motorsports	KTM	15	+49.274	23	
19	51	(Spain) Brian Uriarte	Red Bull KTM Ajo	KTM	15	+1:18.732	7	
Ret	6	(Japan) Ryusei Yamanaka	Aeon Credit – MT Helmets – MSi	KTM	13	Technical	11	
Ret	10	(Italy) Nicola Carraro	Rivacold Snipers Team	Honda	12	Accident	25	
Ret	14	(New Zealand) Cormac Buchanan	Code Motorsports	KTM	8	Technical	8	
Ret	13	(Malaysia) Hakim Danish	Aeon Credit – MT Helmets – MSi	KTM	5	Accident damage	9	
Ret	19	(United Kingdom) Scott Ogden	CIP Green Power	KTM	5	Accident	1	
Ret	11	(Spain) Adrián Cruces	CIP Green Power	KTM	4	Collision	2	
DNS	28	(Spain) Máximo Quiles	CFMoto Valresa Aspar Team	KTM		Injury		
Fastest lap: (Spain) Álvaro Carpe (KTM) – 2:10.199 (lap 10)
Official Moto3 Race Report

== Championship standings after the race ==
Below are the standings for the top five riders, constructors, and teams after the round.

=== MotoGP ===
Riders' Championship standings

	Pos.	Rider	Points
	1	(Spain) Jorge Martín	240
2	2	(Italy) Marco Bezzecchi	209
1	3	(Japan) Ai Ogura	203
1	4	(Spain) Marc Márquez	200
	5	(Italy) Fabio Di Giannantonio	199

Constructors' Championship standings

Pos.	Constructor	Points
1	(Italy) Aprilia	367
2	(Italy) Ducati	338
3	(Austria) KTM	205
4	(Japan) Honda	119
5	(Japan) Yamaha	73

Teams' Championship standings

Pos.	Team	Points
1	(Italy) Aprilia Racing	449
2	(United States) SuperFile Trackhouse MotoGP Team	387
3	(Italy) Ducati Lenovo Team	343
4	(Italy) Pertamina Enduro VR46 Racing Team	252
5	(Austria) Red Bull KTM Factory Racing	235

=== Moto2 ===
Riders' Championship standings

	Pos.	Rider	Points
	1	(Spain) Manuel González	197.5
	2	(Spain) Izan Guevara	155
	3	(Australia) Senna Agius	136
2	4	(Spain) Iván Ortolá	133.5
	5	(Spain) Daniel Holgado	128

Constructors' Championship standings

Pos.	Constructor	Points
1	(Germany) Kalex	282.5
2	(Italy) Boscoscuro	176
3	(Switzerland) Forward	50

Teams' Championship standings

	Pos.	Team	Points
	1	(Germany) Liqui Moly Dynavolt Intact GP	333.5
	2	(Spain) CFMoto Gaviota Aspar Team	244
	3	(Italy) Blu Cru Pramac Yamaha Moto2	170.5
2	4	(United States) OnlyFans American Racing Team	144
	5	(Spain) QJMotor – Biolec – MSi	137.5

=== Moto3 ===
Riders' Championship standings

	Pos.	Rider	Points
	1	(Spain) Máximo Quiles	231
1	2	(Spain) Álvaro Carpe	146
2	3	(Spain) David Almansa	134
2	4	(Spain) Brian Uriarte	127
1	5	(Argentina) Marco Morelli	115

Constructors' Championship standings

Pos.	Constructor	Points
1	(Austria) KTM	295
2	(Japan) Honda	154

Teams' Championship standings

	Pos.	Team	Points
	1	(Spain) CFMoto Valresa Aspar Team	346
	2	(Finland) Red Bull KTM Ajo	273
	3	(Germany) Liqui Moly Dynavolt Intact GP	194
	4	(France) Red Bull KTM Tech3	155
1	5	(Italy) LevelUp – MTA	125

== Notes ==
Previous race: 2026 German Grand Prix	FIM Grand Prix World Championship; 2026 season	Next race: 2026 Aragon Grand Prix
Previous race: 2025 British Grand Prix	British motorcycle Grand Prix	Next race: 2027 British Grand Prix
