= 2026 French motorcycle Grand Prix =

Motorcycle races in Le Mans

(France) 2026 French Grand Prix
Race details
- Race 5 of 22 races in the 2026 Grand Prix motorcycle racing season
- Date: 10 May 2026
- Official name: Michelin Grand Prix of France
- Location: Bugatti Circuit; Le Mans, France
- Course: Permanent racing facility; 4.423 km (2.748 mi)

MotoGP
Pole position
Rider	(Italy) Francesco Bagnaia	Ducati
Time	1:29.634	
Fastest lap
Rider	(Italy) Francesco Bagnaia	Ducati
Time	1:31.164 on lap 5	
Podium
First	(Spain) Jorge Martín	Aprilia
Second	(Italy) Marco Bezzecchi	Aprilia
Third	(Japan) Ai Ogura	Aprilia

Moto2
Pole position
Rider	(Spain) Izan Guevara	Boscoscuro
Time	1:33.910	
Fastest lap
Rider	(Spain) Iván Ortolá	Kalex
Time	1:34.455 on lap 4	
Podium
First	(Spain) Izan Guevara	Boscoscuro
Second	(Spain) Manuel González	Kalex
Third	(Spain) Iván Ortolá	Kalex

Moto3
Pole position
Rider	(Spain) Adrián Fernández (Note: Fernández originally set the fastest time in qualifying and started the race from pole position, but was disqualified from the first six races (including qualifying) of the season for engine tampering. Máximo Quiles, who qualified and started second, inherited the pole position statistic. However, Fernández's team Leopard Racing appealed the disqualification and won the appeal verdict, thus reinstating his results in the first six races.)	Honda
Time	1:40.044	
Fastest lap
Rider	(Italy) Matteo Bertelle	KTM
Time	1:52.688 on lap 9	
Podium
First	(Spain) Máximo Quiles	KTM
Second	(Spain) Adrián Fernández	Honda
Third	(Italy) Matteo Bertelle	KTM

The 2026 French motorcycle Grand Prix (officially known as the Michelin Grand Prix of France) was the fifth round of the 2026 Grand Prix motorcycle racing season. All races were held at the Bugatti Circuit in Le Mans on 10 May 2026.

== Qualifying ==
=== MotoGP ===
Fastest session lap

Pos.	No.	Rider	Team	Constructor	Q1	Q2	Final grid	Row
1	63	(Italy) Francesco Bagnaia	Ducati Lenovo Team	Ducati	Qualified to Q2	1:29.634	1	1
2	93	(Spain) Marc Márquez	Ducati Lenovo Team	Ducati	1:29.288	1:29.646	2	1
3	72	(Italy) Marco Bezzecchi	Aprilia Racing	Aprilia	Qualified to Q2	1:29.657	3	1
4	49	(Italy) Fabio Di Giannantonio	Pertamina Enduro VR46 Racing Team	Ducati	Qualified to Q2	1:29.699	4	2
5	37	(Spain) Pedro Acosta	Red Bull KTM Factory Racing	KTM	Qualified to Q2	1:29.817	5	2
6	20	(France) Fabio Quartararo	Monster Energy Yamaha MotoGP Team	Yamaha	1:29.719	1:29.831	6	2
7	36	(Spain) Joan Mir	Honda HRC Castrol	Honda	Qualified to Q2	1:29.837	7	3
8	89	(Spain) Jorge Martín	Aprilia Racing	Aprilia	Qualified to Q2	1:29.847	8	3
9	79	(Japan) Ai Ogura	Trackhouse MotoGP Team	Aprilia	Qualified to Q2	1:29.888	9	3
10	73	(Spain) Álex Márquez	BK8 Gresini Racing MotoGP	Ducati	Qualified to Q2	1:29.931	10	4
11	5	(France) Johann Zarco	Castrol Honda LCR	Honda	Qualified to Q2	1:30.371	11	4
12	42	(Spain) Álex Rins	Monster Energy Yamaha MotoGP Team	Yamaha	Qualified to Q2	1:30.616	12	4
13	25	(Spain) Raúl Fernández	Trackhouse MotoGP Team	Aprilia	1:29.885	N/A	13	5
14	23	(Italy) Enea Bastianini	Red Bull KTM Tech3	KTM	1:30.360	N/A	14	5
15	10	(Italy) Luca Marini	Honda HRC Castrol	Honda	1:30.396	N/A	15	5
16	21	(Italy) Franco Morbidelli	Pertamina Enduro VR46 Racing Team	Ducati	1:30.413	N/A	16	6
17	7	(Turkey) Toprak Razgatlıoğlu	Prima Pramac Yamaha MotoGP	Yamaha	1:30.419	N/A	17	6
18	11	(Brazil) Diogo Moreira	Pro Honda LCR	Honda	1:30.428	N/A	18	6
19	43	(Australia) Jack Miller	Prima Pramac Yamaha MotoGP	Yamaha	1:30.439	N/A	19	7
20	54	(Spain) Fermín Aldeguer	BK8 Gresini Racing MotoGP	Ducati	1:30.769	N/A	20	7
21	33	(South Africa) Brad Binder	Red Bull KTM Factory Racing	KTM	1:30.825	N/A	21	7
22	94	(Germany) Jonas Folger	Red Bull KTM Tech3	KTM	1:31.826	N/A	22	8
Official MotoGP Qualifying 1 Report
Official MotoGP Qualifying 2 Report
Official MotoGP Grid Report

== MotoGP Sprint ==
The MotoGP Sprint was held on 9 May 2026.

Pos.	No.	Rider	Team	Manufacturer	Laps	Time/Retired	Grid	Points
1	89	(Spain) Jorge Martín	Aprilia Racing	Aprilia	13	19:46.830	8	12
2	63	(Italy) Francesco Bagnaia	Ducati Lenovo Team	Ducati	13	+1.107	1	9
3	72	(Italy) Marco Bezzecchi	Aprilia Racing	Aprilia	13	+2.786	3	7
4	37	(Spain) Pedro Acosta	Red Bull KTM Factory Racing	KTM	13	+3.808	5	6
5	20	(France) Fabio Quartararo	Monster Energy Yamaha MotoGP Team	Yamaha	13	+4.402	6	5
6	36	(Spain) Joan Mir	Honda HRC Castrol	Honda	13	+4.630	7	4
7	79	(Japan) Ai Ogura	Trackhouse MotoGP Team	Aprilia	13	+5.670	9	3
8	73	(Spain) Álex Márquez	BK8 Gresini Racing MotoGP	Ducati	13	+6.608	10	2
9	11	(Brazil) Diogo Moreira	Pro Honda LCR	Honda	13	+10.368	18	1
10	5	(France) Johann Zarco	Castrol Honda LCR	Honda	13	+11.771	11	
11	54	(Spain) Fermín Aldeguer	BK8 Gresini Racing MotoGP	Ducati	13	+13.435	20	
12	33	(South Africa) Brad Binder	Red Bull KTM Factory Racing	KTM	13	+14.708	21	
13	42	(Spain) Álex Rins	Monster Energy Yamaha MotoGP Team	Yamaha	13	+15.413	12	
14	7	(Turkey) Toprak Razgatlıoğlu	Prima Pramac Yamaha MotoGP	Yamaha	13	+16.968	17	
15	43	(Australia) Jack Miller	Prima Pramac Yamaha MotoGP	Yamaha	13	+17.603	19	
16	49	(Italy) Fabio Di Giannantonio	Pertamina Enduro VR46 Racing Team	Ducati	12	+1 lap	6	
Ret	93	(Spain) Marc Márquez	Ducati Lenovo Team	Ducati	11	Accident	2	
Ret	25	(Spain) Raúl Fernández	Trackhouse MotoGP Team	Aprilia	11	Accident	13	
Ret	21	(Italy) Franco Morbidelli	Pertamina Enduro VR46 Racing Team	Ducati	6	Accident damage	16	
Ret	23	(Italy) Enea Bastianini	Red Bull KTM Tech3	KTM	4	Accident	14	
Ret	10	(Italy) Luca Marini	Honda HRC Castrol	Honda	1	Accident	15	
Ret	94	(Germany) Jonas Folger	Red Bull KTM Tech3	KTM	1	Accident	22	
Fastest sprint lap: (Spain) Jorge Martín (Aprilia) - 1:30.561 (lap 3)
Official MotoGP Sprint Report

== Race ==
=== MotoGP ===
Pos.	No.	Rider	Team	Manufacturer	Laps	Time/Retired	Grid	Points
1	89	(Spain) Jorge Martín	Aprilia Racing	Aprilia	27	41:18.001	7	25
2	72	(Italy) Marco Bezzecchi	Aprilia Racing	Aprilia	27	+0.477	2	20
3	79	(Japan) Ai Ogura	Trackhouse MotoGP Team	Aprilia	27	+0.874	8	16
4	49	(Italy) Fabio Di Giannantonio	Pertamina Enduro VR46 Racing Team	Ducati	27	+2.851	3	13
5	37	(Spain) Pedro Acosta	Red Bull KTM Factory Racing	KTM	27	+2.991	4	11
6	20	(France) Fabio Quartararo	Monster Energy Yamaha MotoGP Team	Yamaha	27	+7.756	5	10
7	23	(Italy) Enea Bastianini	Red Bull KTM Tech3	KTM	27	+8.615	13	9
8	25	(Spain) Raúl Fernández	Trackhouse MotoGP Team	Aprilia	27	+12.497	12	8
9	54	(Spain) Fermín Aldeguer	BK8 Gresini Racing MotoGP	Ducati	27	+14.903	19	7
10	10	(Italy) Luca Marini	Honda HRC Castrol	Honda	27	+15.016	14	6
11	5	(France) Johann Zarco	Castrol Honda LCR	Honda	27	+16.549	10	5
12	42	(Spain) Álex Rins	Monster Energy Yamaha MotoGP Team	Yamaha	27	+32.343	11	4
13	7	(Turkey) Toprak Razgatlıoğlu	Prima Pramac Yamaha MotoGP	Yamaha	27	+32.476	16	3
14	21	(Italy) Franco Morbidelli	Pertamina Enduro VR46 Racing Team	Ducati	27	+32.774	15	2
15	43	(Australia) Jack Miller	Prima Pramac Yamaha MotoGP	Yamaha	27	+36.059	18	1
16	94	(Germany) Jonas Folger	Red Bull KTM Tech3	KTM	27	+1:13.229	21	
Ret	33	(South Africa) Brad Binder	Red Bull KTM Factory Racing	KTM	20	Accident	20	
Ret	36	(Spain) Joan Mir	Honda HRC Castrol	Honda	19	Accident	6	
Ret	63	(Italy) Francesco Bagnaia	Ducati Lenovo Team	Ducati	15	Accident	1	
Ret	11	(Brazil) Diogo Moreira	Pro Honda LCR	Honda	10	Accident	17	
Ret	73	(Spain) Álex Márquez	BK8 Gresini Racing MotoGP	Ducati	1	Accident	9	
DNS	93	(Spain) Marc Márquez	Ducati Lenovo Team	Ducati		Did not start		
Fastest lap: (Italy) Francesco Bagnaia (Ducati) – 1:31.164 (lap 5)
Official MotoGP Race Report

=== Moto2 ===
The race was originally scheduled to run a total of 22 laps, but was shortened to 14 after Race Direction declared a wet start procedure. On lap 3, Jorge Navarro crashed and the race was red-flagged due to the inability to clear the track in time. Race distance was subsequently shortened to 9 laps.

Pos.	No.	Rider	Team	Manufacturer	Laps	Time/Retired	Grid	Points
1	28	(Spain) Izan Guevara	Blu Cru Pramac Yamaha Moto2	Boscoscuro	9	14:14.987	1	25
2	18	(Spain) Manuel González	Liqui Moly Dynavolt Intact GP	Kalex	9	+0.566	5	20
3	4	(Spain) Iván Ortolá	QJMotor – El Motorista – MSi	Kalex	9	+2.969	14	16
4	21	(Spain) Alonso López	Italjet Gresini Moto2	Kalex	9	+3.949	8	13
5	80	(Colombia) David Alonso	CFMoto Inde Aspar Team	Kalex	9	+5.165	7	11
6	13	(Italy) Celestino Vietti	Folladore SpeedRS Team	Boscoscuro	9	+6.011	9	10
7	81	(Australia) Senna Agius	Liqui Moly Dynavolt Intact GP	Kalex	9	+6.673	11	9
8	8	(United States) Joe Roberts	OnlyFans American Racing Team	Kalex	9	+6.848	6	8
9	12	(Czech Republic) Filip Salač	OnlyFans American Racing Team	Kalex	9	+9.112	3	7
10	44	(Spain) Aron Canet	Elf Marc VDS Racing Team	Boscoscuro	9	+10.306	17	6
11	3	(Spain) Sergio García	Italjet Gresini Moto2	Kalex	9	+11.571	12	5
12	84	(Netherlands) Zonta van den Goorbergh	Momoven Idrofoglia RW Racing Team	Kalex	9	+11.773	18	4
13	53	(Turkey) Deniz Öncü	Elf Marc VDS Racing Team	Boscoscuro	9	+12.301	21	3
14	14	(Italy) Tony Arbolino	Reds Fantic Racing	Kalex	9	+13.649	15	2
15	54	(Spain) Alberto Ferrández	Blu Cru Pramac Yamaha Moto2	Boscoscuro	9	+14.469	25	1
16	32	(Italy) Luca Lunetta	Folladore SpeedRS Team	Boscoscuro	9	+14.664	28	
17	98	(Spain) José Antonio Rueda	Red Bull KTM Ajo	Kalex	9	+14.791	19	
18	99	(Spain) Adrián Huertas	Italtrans Racing Team	Kalex	9	+16.628	27	
19	24	(Spain) Marcos Ramírez	QJMotor – El Motorista – MSi	Kalex	9	+17.742	22	
20	11	(Spain) Álex Escrig	Klint Racing Team	Forward	9	+21.204	20	
21	64	(Indonesia) Mario Aji	Idemitsu Honda Team Asia	Kalex	9	+22.773	23	
22	72	(Japan) Taiyo Furusato	Idemitsu Honda Team Asia	Kalex	9	+24.287	24	
23	17	(Spain) Daniel Muñoz	Italtrans Racing Team	Kalex	9	+26.322	16	
Ret	71	(Japan) Ayumu Sasaki	Momoven Idrofoglia RW Racing Team	Kalex	3	Accident	13	
Ret	95	(Netherlands) Collin Veijer	Red Bull KTM Ajo	Kalex	1	Accident	10	
Ret	7	(Belgium) Barry Baltus	Reds Fantic Racing	Kalex	0	Accident	4	
DNS	9	(Spain) Jorge Navarro	Klint Racing Team	Forward		Did not restart		
DSQ	96	(Spain) Daniel Holgado	CFMoto Inde Aspar Team	Kalex		Technical infringement (Note: Crashed in Race 1 and competed in Race 2 without a front fender.)		
Fastest lap: (Spain) Iván Ortolá (Kalex) – 1:34.455 (lap 4)
Official Moto2 Race Report

=== Moto3 ===
The race was originally scheduled to run a total of 20 laps, but was shortened to 13 in order to give teams time to assess the track conditions following rainfall prior to the start of the race.

Pos.	No.	Rider	Team	Manufacturer	Laps	Time/Retired	Grid	Points
1	28	(Spain) Máximo Quiles	CFMoto Gaviota Aspar Team	KTM	13	24:41.640	2	25
2	31	(Spain) Adrián Fernández (Note: Originally finished second but was disqualified from the first six races of the season for engine tampering. However, his team Leopard Racing appealed the disqualification and won the appeal verdict, thus reinstating his results in the first six races.)	Leopard Racing	Honda	13	+1.888	1	20
3	18	(Italy) Matteo Bertelle	LevelUp – MTA	KTM	13	+4.227	9	16
4	9	(Indonesia) Veda Pratama	Honda Team Asia	Honda	13	+7.659	6	13
5	78	(Spain) Joel Esteban	LevelUp – MTA	KTM	13	+10.916	20	11
6	94	(Italy) Guido Pini	Leopard Racing	Honda	13	+17.707	11	10
7	11	(Spain) Adrián Cruces	CIP Green Power	KTM	13	+20.164	17	9
8	22	(Spain) David Almansa	Liqui Moly Dynavolt Intact GP	KTM	13	+20.893	13	8
9	8	(United Kingdom) Eddie O'Shea	Gryd – MLav Racing	Honda	13	+21.075	10	7
10	13	(Malaysia) Hakim Danish	Aeon Credit – MT Helmets – MSi	KTM	13	+21.847	12	6
11	73	(Argentina) Valentín Perrone	Red Bull KTM Tech3	KTM	13	+26.119	14	5
12	6	(Japan) Ryusei Yamanaka	Aeon Credit – MT Helmets – MSi	KTM	13	+26.193	21	4
13	97	(Argentina) Marco Morelli	CFMoto Gaviota Aspar Team	KTM	13	+32.602	4	3
14	5	(Austria) Leo Rammerstorfer	Sic58 Squadra Corse	Honda	13	+33.641	25	2
15	51	(Spain) Brian Uriarte	Red Bull KTM Ajo	KTM	13	+34.968	7	1
16	32	(Japan) Zen Mitani	Honda Team Asia	Honda	13	+43.820	26	
17	21	(South Africa) Ruché Moodley	Code Motorsports	KTM	13	+44.174	24	
18	64	(Spain) David Muñoz	Liqui Moly Dynavolt Intact GP	KTM	13	+1:35.800	5	
Ret	19	(United Kingdom) Scott Ogden	CIP Green Power	KTM	7	Accident	18	
Ret	27	(Finland) Rico Salmela	Red Bull KTM Tech3	KTM	7	Accident	23	
Ret	54	(Spain) Jesús Ríos	Rivacold Snipers Team	Honda	6	Accident	16	
Ret	66	(Australia) Joel Kelso	Gryd – MLav Racing	Honda	6	Accident damage	3	
Ret	83	(Spain) Álvaro Carpe	Red Bull KTM Ajo	KTM	4	Accident damage	8	
Ret	10	(Italy) Nicola Carraro	Rivacold Snipers Team	Honda	3	Accident	22	
Ret	67	(Republic of Ireland) Casey O'Gorman	Sic58 Squadra Corse	Honda	1	Accident	19	
Ret	14	(New Zealand) Cormac Buchanan	Code Motorsports	KTM	0	Accident	15	
Fastest lap: (Italy) Matteo Bertelle (KTM) – 1:52.688 (lap 9)
Official Moto3 Race Report

== Championship standings after the race ==
Below are the standings for the top five riders, constructors, and teams after the round.

=== MotoGP ===
Riders' Championship standings

	Pos.	Rider	Points
	1	(Italy) Marco Bezzecchi	128
	2	(Spain) Jorge Martín	127
	3	(Italy) Fabio Di Giannantonio	84
	4	(Spain) Pedro Acosta	83
3	5	(Japan) Ai Ogura	67

Constructors' Championship standings

Pos.	Constructor	Points
1	(Italy) Aprilia	162
2	(Italy) Ducati	128
3	(Austria) KTM	96
4	(Japan) Honda	49
5	(Japan) Yamaha	29

Teams' Championship standings

	Pos.	Team	Points
	1	(Italy) Aprilia Racing	255
	2	(United States) Trackhouse MotoGP Team	129
2	3	(Austria) Red Bull KTM Factory Racing	111
1	4	(Italy) Pertamina Enduro VR46 Racing Team	111
	5	(Italy) Ducati Lenovo Team	100

=== Moto2 ===
Riders' Championship standings

	Pos.	Rider	Points
	1	(Spain) Manuel González	79.5
1	2	(Spain) Izan Guevara	70
1	3	(Australia) Senna Agius	59
	4	(Italy) Celestino Vietti	53
1	5	(Colombia) David Alonso	48

Constructors' Championship standings

Pos.	Constructor	Points
1	(Germany) Kalex	107.5
2	(Italy) Boscoscuro	76
3	(Switzerland) Forward	30

Teams' Championship standings

	Pos.	Team	Points
	1	(Germany) Liqui Moly Dynavolt Intact GP	138.5
	2	(Spain) CFMoto Inde Aspar Team	86
	3	(Italy) Blu Cru Pramac Yamaha Moto2	71.5
1	4	(Italy) Folladore SpeedRS Team	53
1	5	(Italy) Italtrans Racing Team	44

=== Moto3 ===
Riders' Championship standings

	Pos.	Rider	Points
	1	(Spain) Máximo Quiles	115
1	2	(Spain) Adrián Fernández	69
1	3	(Spain) Álvaro Carpe	53
	4	(Argentina) Valentín Perrone	52
1	5	(Indonesia) Veda Pratama	50

Constructors' Championship standings

Pos.	Constructor	Points
1	(Austria) KTM	120
2	(Japan) Honda	92

Teams' Championship standings

Pos.	Team	Points
1	(Spain) CFMoto Gaviota Aspar Team	163
2	(Luxembourg) Leopard Racing	115
3	(Finland) Red Bull KTM Ajo	82
4	(France) Red Bull KTM Tech3	73
5	(Germany) Liqui Moly Dynavolt Intact GP	65

== Notes ==
Previous race: 2026 Spanish Grand Prix	FIM Grand Prix World Championship; 2026 season	Next race: 2026 Catalan Grand Prix
Previous race: 2025 French Grand Prix	French motorcycle Grand Prix	Next race: 2027 French Grand Prix
