= Vicente Pérez (motorcyclist) =

Spanish motorcycle racer

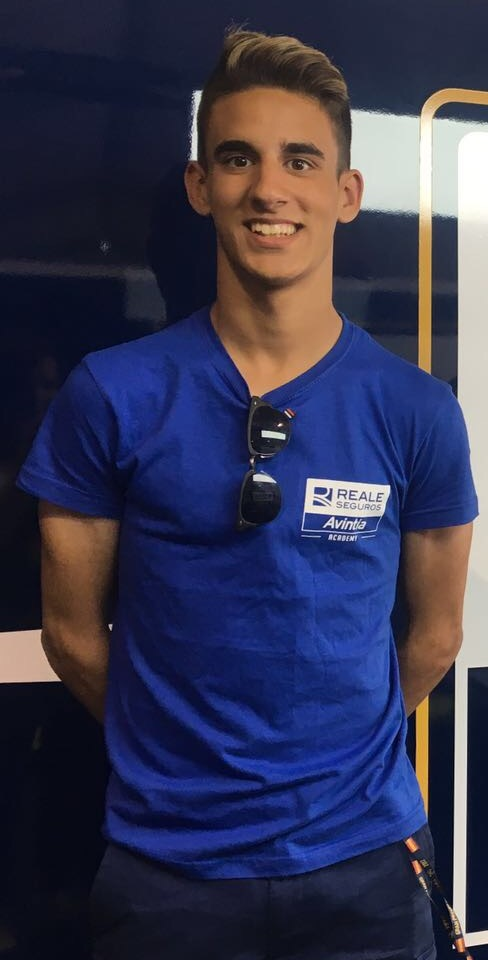
- Nationality: Spanish
- Born: 21 October 1997 (age 29); Valencia, Spain
- Current team: MLav Racing
- Bike number: 21
Motorcycle racing career statistics
Moto3 World Championship
Active years	2016–2019, 2022–2025
Manufacturers	Peugeot, KTM, Honda
Championships	0
2024 championship position	24th (3 pts)
Starts / Wins / Podiums / Poles / F. laps / Points; 39 / 0 / 0 / 0 / 0 / 41
Supersport 300 World Championship
Active years	2021
Manufacturers	Yamaha
Championships	0
2021 championship position	33rd (9 pts)
Starts / Wins / Podiums / Poles / F. laps / Points; 10 / 0 / 0 / 0 / 0 / 9

Vicente Pérez Selfa (born 21 October 1997) is a Spanish motorcycle racer. For the second half of the 2024 season, he raced in the European rounds of the Moto3 World Championship on a Honda NSF250R for Michael Laverty's MLav Racing, replacing Joshua Whatley.

Following the death of fellow Avintia Academy rider Andreas Pérez (who was not related to him), he switched his bike number to No. 77 as a tribute, while also replacing Livio Loi in the Moto3 category.

In 2023, Pérez won the Italian Moto3 championship. In the same year, he finished at a career best fifth place in the Qatar Grand Prix at world championship level.

== Career statistics ==
=== Career highlights ===
- 2023: 1st, CIV Moto3 Championship
- 2026: 1st, CIV Moto3 Championship

=== FIM CEV Moto3 Junior World Championship ===
==== Races by year ====
(key) (Races in bold indicate pole position, races in italics indicate fastest lap)

Year	Bike	1	2	3	4	5	6	7	8	9	10	11	12	Pos	Pts
2014	MIR Racing	JER1	JER2	LMS	ARA	CAT1	CAT2	ALB; Ret	NAV	ALG; Ret	VAL1; Ret	VAL2; 21		NC	0
2015	Honda	ALG; Ret	LMS; 18	CAT1	CAT2	ARA1	ARA2							23rd	16
2015	MIR Racing							ALB; Ret	NAV; Ret	JER1; 11	JER2; 13	VAL1; 20	VAL2; 9	23rd	16
2016	BeOn	VAL1	VAL2	LMS; 20	ARA; 25	CAT1; 17	CAT2; 20							19th	30
2016	KTM							ALB; Ret	ALG; Ret	JER1; 10	JER2; 9	VAL1; 7	VAL2; 8	19th	30
2017	KTM	ALB; 10	LMS; 6	CAT1; 6	CAT2; 6	**VAL1**; 4	**VAL2**; 3	EST; Ret	JER1; 5	JER1; 2	ARA; 7	VAL1; 3	VAL2; Ret	4th	121
2018	KTM	EST; 3	VAL1; Ret	VAL2; 8	FRA; 7	CAT1; Ret	CAT2; 15	ARA	JER1	JER2	ALB	VAL1	VAL2	16th	34
2019	KTM	EST	VAL1	VAL2	FRA	CAT1	CAT2	ARA	JER1; 14	JER2; 8	ALB; 17	VAL1; 18	VAL2; 12	19th	25
2020	KTM	EST	POR	JER1	JER2	JER3	ARA1	ARA2	ARA3	VAL1; 13	VAL2; 13	VAL3; Ret		24th	6

=== Grand Prix motorcycle racing ===
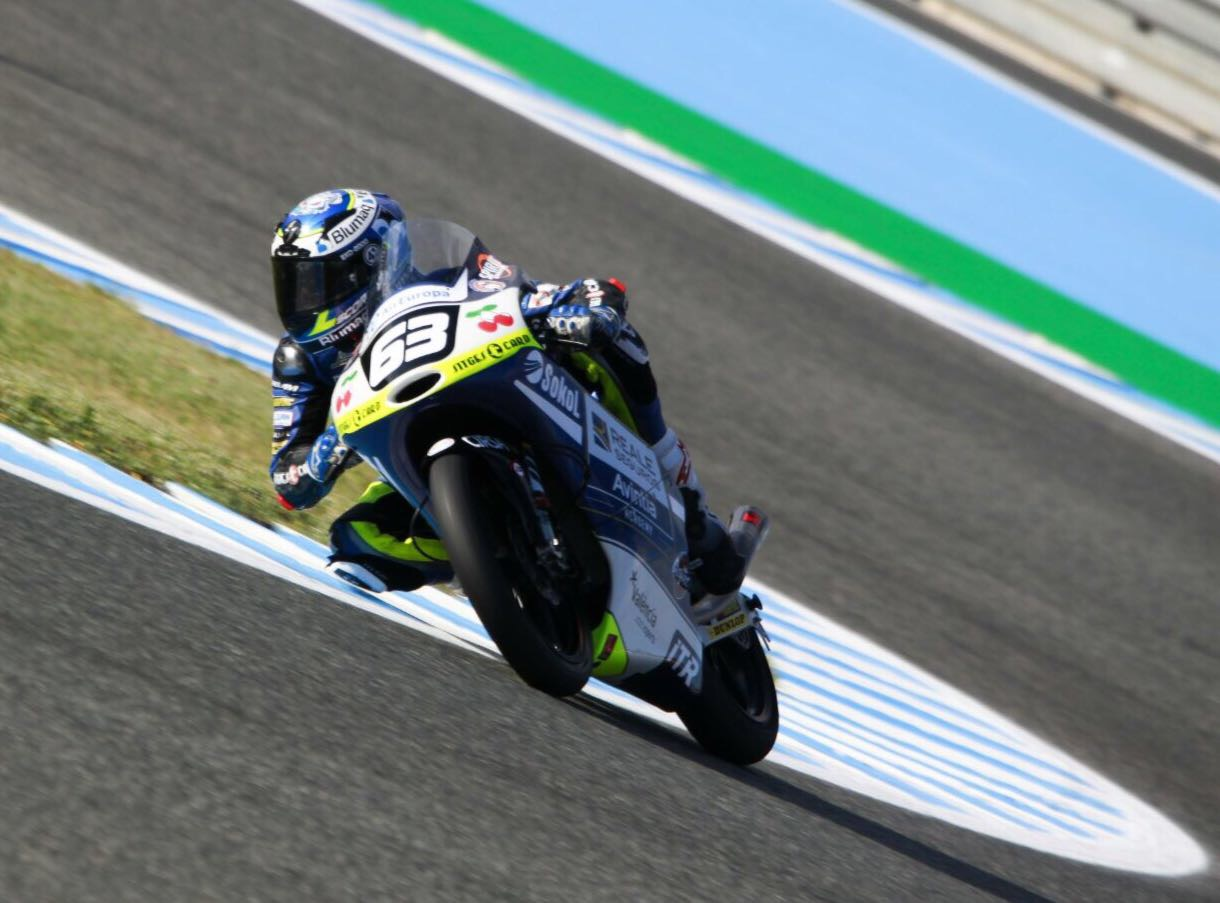
Vicente Pérez at the 2017 Spanish motorcycle Grand Prix

==== By season ====
Season	Class	Motorcycle	Team	Race	Win	Podium	Pole	FLap	Pts	Plcd
2016	Moto3	Peugeot	Peugeot MC Saxoprint	1	0	0	0	0	0	NC
2017	Moto3	KTM	Reale Avintia Academy	2	0	0	0	0	0	NC
2018	Moto3	KTM	Reale Avintia Academy	10	0	0	0	0	16	27th
2019	Moto3	KTM	Reale Avintia Arizona 77	7	0	0	0	0	0	38th
2022	Moto3	Honda	Rivacold Snipers Team	1	0	0	0	0	0	34th
2023	Moto3	KTM	Boé Motorsports	6	0	0	0	0	15	26th
2024	Moto3	KTM	Red Bull KTM Ajo	3	0	0	0	0	3	24th
2024	Moto3	Honda	MLav Racing	3	0	0	0	0	3	24th
2025	Moto3	KTM	LevelUp – MTA	4	0	0	0	0	7*	27th*
2025	Moto3	Honda	Gryd – MLav Racing	2	0	0	0	0	7*	27th*
Total				**39**	**0**	**0**	**0**	**0**	**41**	

==== Races by year ====
(key) (Races in bold indicate pole position; races in italics indicate fastest lap)

Year	Class	Bike	1	2	3	4	5	6	7	8	9	10	11	12	13	14	15	16	17	18	19	20	21	22	Pos	Pts
2016	Moto3	Peugeot	QAT	ARG	AME	SPA	FRA	ITA	CAT	NED	GER	AUT	CZE	GBR	RSM	ARA	JPN	AUS	MAL	VAL; 23					NC	0
2017	Moto3	KTM	QAT	ARG	AME	SPA; Ret	FRA	ITA	CAT; Ret	NED	GER	CZE	AUT	GBR	RSM	ARA	JPN	AUS	MAL	VAL					NC	0
2018	Moto3	KTM	QAT	ARG	AME	SPA	FRA	ITA	CAT; DNS	NED	GER; Ret	CZE; 21	AUT; 25	GBR; C	RSM; 14	ARA; 15	THA; 6	JPN; Ret	AUS; 20	MAL; 13	VAL; Ret				27th	16
2019	Moto3	KTM	QAT; 17	ARG; Ret	AME; 17	SPA; 20	FRA; Ret	ITA; 19	CAT; 18	NED	GER	CZE	AUT	GBR	RSM	ARA	THA	JPN	AUS	MAL	VAL				38th	0
2022	Moto3	Honda	QAT	INA	ARG	AME	POR	SPA	FRA	ITA	CAT	GER	NED	GBR	AUT	RSM	ARA	JPN	THA; 19	AUS	MAL	VAL			34th	0
2023	Moto3	KTM	POR	ARG	AME	SPA	FRA	ITA; Ret	GER	NED	GBR	AUT	CAT	RSM	IND	JPN	INA	AUS; Ret	THA; 18	MAL; 12	QAT; 5	VAL; Ret			26th	15
2024	Moto3	KTM	QAT; Ret	POR; 13	AME	SPA; 16	FRA	CAT	ITA	NED	GER														24th	3
2024	Moto3	Honda										GBR; Ret	AUT; 23	ARA; DNS	RSM; Ret	EMI; DNS	INA	JPN	AUS	THA	MAL	SLD			24th	3
2025	Moto3	KTM	THA	ARG	AME	QAT	SPA; 18	FRA; 16	GBR; 9	ARA; 22															29th	7
2025	Moto3	Honda									ITA; Ret	NED	GER; DNS	CZE	AUT; Ret	HUN	CAT	RSM	JPN	INA	AUS	MAL	POR	VAL	29th	7

=== Supersport 300 World Championship ===
==== Races by year ====
(key) (Races in bold indicate pole position; races in italics indicate fastest lap)

Year	Bike	1	2	3	4	5	6	7	8	9	10	11	12	13	14	15	16	Pos	Pts
2021	Yamaha	SPA; 21	SPA; Ret	ITA; 7	ITA; Ret	NED; Ret	NED; Ret	CZE; Ret	CZE; Ret	FRA; Ret	FRA; Ret	SPA	SPA	SPA	SPA	POR; DNS	POR; DNS	33rd	9

=== TVS Asia One Make Championship ===
==== Races by year ====
(key) (Races in bold indicate pole position; races in italics indicate fastest lap)

Year	Bike	1		2		3		4		5		6		Pos	Pts
Year	Bike	R1	R2	R1	R2	R1	R2	R1	R2	R1	R2	R1	R2	Pos	Pts
2026	TVS	SEP	SEP	CHA	CHA	**MOT**; 2	**MOT**; 1	**MAN**; 1	**MAN**; 1	MIS	MIS	CHA	CHA	6th*	95*
