= Fabio Di Giannantonio =

Italian motorcycle racer

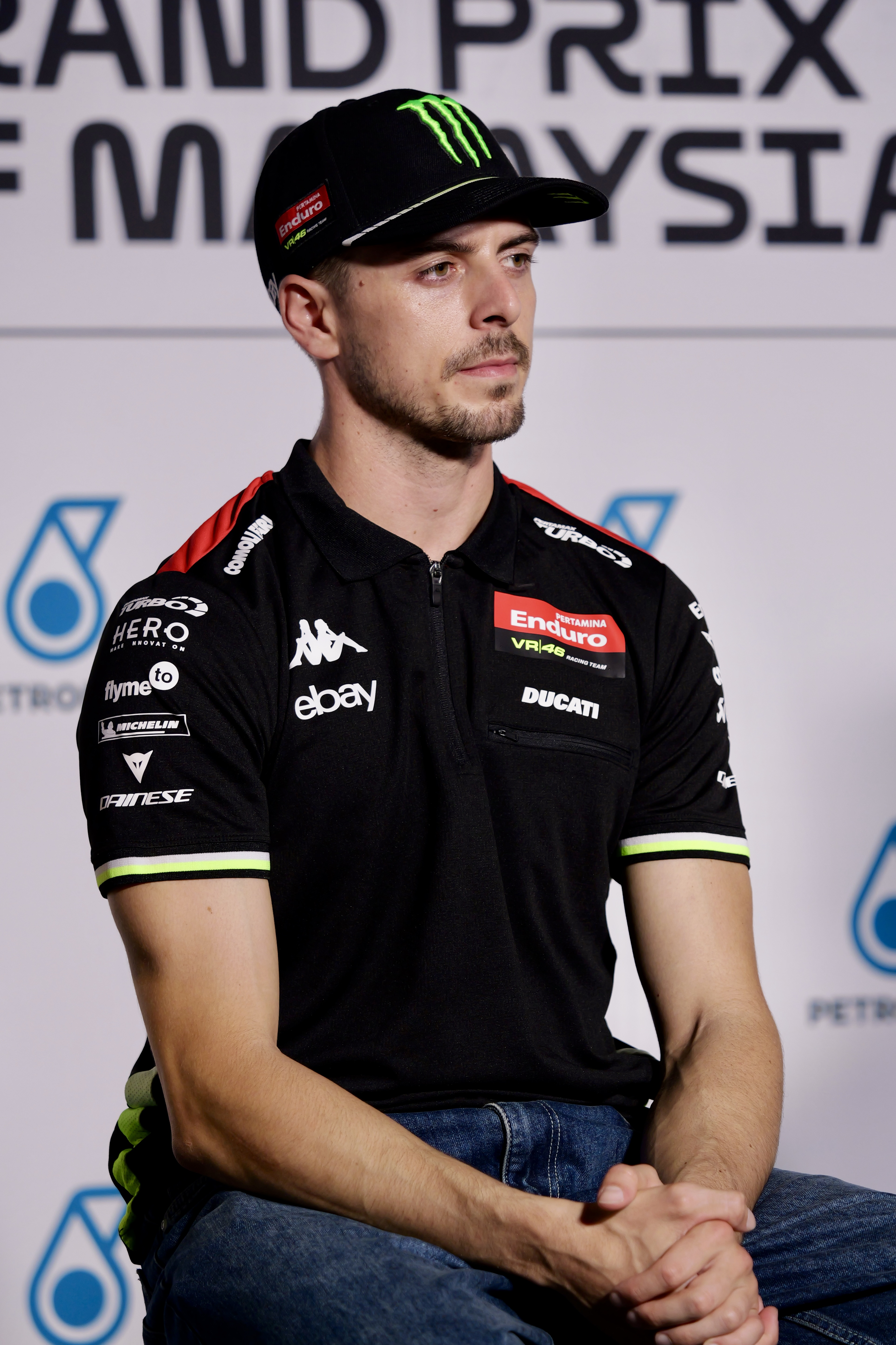
- Di Giannantonio at the 2025 Malaysian Grand Prix
- Nationality: Italian
- Born: 10 October 1998 (age 28); Rome, Italy
- Current team: Pertamina Enduro VR46 Racing Team
- Bike number: 49
Motorcycle racing career statistics
MotoGP World Championship
Active years	2022–
Manufacturers	Ducati
Championships	0
2025 championship position	6th (262 pts)
Starts / Wins / Podiums / Poles / F. laps / Points; 85 / 2 / 9 / 3 / 2 / 718
Moto2 World Championship
Active years	2019–2021
Manufacturers	Speed Up, Kalex
Championships	0
2021 championship position	7th (161 pts)
Starts / Wins / Podiums / Poles / F. laps / Points; 52 / 1 / 8 / 1 / 0 / 334
Moto3 World Championship
Active years	2015–2018
Manufacturers	Honda
Championships	0
2018 championship position	2nd (218 pts)
Starts / Wins / Podiums / Poles / F. laps / Points; 55 / 2 / 14 / 0 / 3 / 505

Fabio Di Giannantonio (born 10 October 1998) is an Italian Grand Prix motorcycle racer, riding for Pertamina Enduro VR46 Racing Team in the MotoGP class of Grand Prix motorcycle racing from 2025.

== Career ==
=== Early career ===
Born in Rome, in 2012, Di Giannantonio won the Italian PreMoto3 250 Championship, while in 2015, he finished as the runner-up in the Red Bull MotoGP Rookies Cup, where he had debuted the year before, and in the CIV Moto3 championship.

=== Moto3 World Championship ===
==== Gresini Racing Moto3 (2015–2016) ====
In the same year, Di Giannantonio made his Grand Prix debut in the Moto3 World Championship with the Gresini Racing team at the Valencian Grand Prix as the replacement for the injured Andrea Locatelli, finishing the race in 23rd place.

For 2016, Di Giannantonio was signed by the same team as a full-time rider in the same class. At the sixth race of the season, at Mugello, Di Giannantonio achieved his first championship points and his first podium finish with a second place, starting a streak of top ten finishes—including two more podiums, another second place at Assen and a third place in Brno.

==== Del Conca Gresini Moto3 (2017–2018) ====
Di Giannantonio started the season with an eighth place in Qatar, but crashed out in Argentina. He took third in Austin, fifth in Spain and another third at Le Mans before taking second in Mugello. A seventh in Catalunya before another crash in Assen. He took two more podiums in Misano and Aragon.

2018 started well for Di Giannantonio, as he took four podiums and two wins to help his team win the teams championship with his teammate Jorge Martín.

=== Moto2 World Championship ===
==== Speed Up Racing (2019–2020) ====
Di Giannantonio moved to Speed Up Racing in Moto2 for 2019 and he took two podiums in Brno and Misano.

2020 didn't fare much better for Di Giannantonio, as he only took two more podiums in Barcelona and Teruel.

==== Federal Oil Gresini Moto2 (2021) ====
After two difficult seasons with Speed Up, Di Giannantonio decided to move to Gresini for the 2021 season and took three more podiums and one win ranking him seventh in the standings.

=== MotoGP World Championship ===
==== Gresini Racing MotoGP (2022–2023) ====
When he moved up to the MotoGP class in 2022, Di Giannantonio stayed with Gresini on a Ducati; his best finish was eighth place in the German Grand Prix, ranking him 20th in the standings for the 2022 season. A highlight in an otherwise difficult season was that Di Giannantonio attained his first premier class pole position at Mugello.

2023 was a much better season for Di Giannantonio, as he took seven top-tens, a top-five and two podiums. On 12 October 2023, it was announced that Marc Marquez, who ended his 11-year stint with Honda the prior week, will be replacing Di Giannantonio in the Gresini Ducati team for the 2024 season. This led to a notable upturn in form for Di Giannantonio, as he took his first premier class podium at Phillip Island, and his maiden MotoGP Grand Prix victory in Qatar. This was a huge surprise and of great importance for his future amidst the uncertainties of a MotoGP ride for the 2024 season, as his performances in the flyaway rounds of 2023 meant he finished the year 12th in the championship.

==== VR46 Racing Team (2024–2026) ====
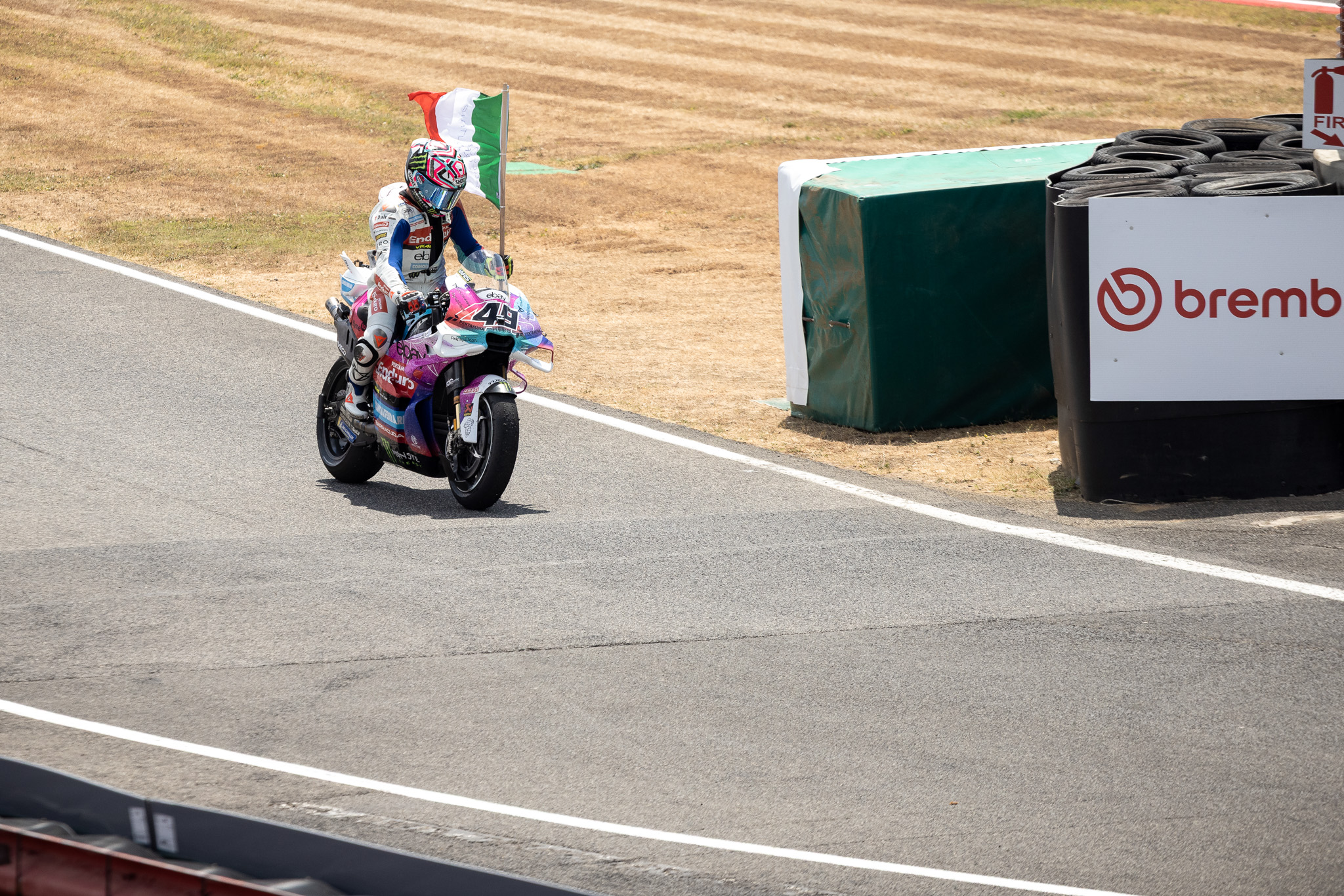
Di Giannantonio during the 2025 Italian motorcycle Grand Prix

Ultimately, the strong performances in the last few races of 2023 saw Di Giannantonio stay in the MotoGP class, as he moved to the VR46 Racing Team, replacing Luca Marini, who moved to Repsol Honda. Despite not winning any races in 2024, Di Giannantonio was consistent throughout the season, with only one finish outside the top-ten.

Di Giannantonio achieved his best MotoGP championship position, finishing tenth over the season. He earned a two-year contract extension with VR46 for the 2025 and 2026 seasons, and would ride with factory equipment for the 2025 season. He started the season with a podium finish at the Grand Prix of the Americas, and a first home podium at the Italian Grand Prix after overtaking the factory Ducati of Francesco Bagnaia on the penultimate lap for third.

==== Red Bull KTM Factory Racing (2027–) ====
After three years at VR46, Di Giannantonio will move to the Red Bull KTM Factory Racing on a multi-year contract, partnering his former Gresini teammate Álex Márquez.

== Career statistics ==
=== Red Bull MotoGP Rookies Cup ===
==== Races by year ====
(key) (Races in bold indicate pole position, races in italics indicate fastest lap)

Year	1	2	3	4	5	6	7	8	9	10	11	12	13	14	Pos	Pts
2014	JER1; 14	JER1; 14	MUG; 7	ASS1; 9	ASS2; 8	SAC1; 8	SAC2; 5	BRN1; 8	BRN2; 2	SIL1; 8	SIL2; 6	MIS; 6	ARA1; 3	ARA2; 16	8th	119
2015	JER1; 5	JER1; 2	ASS1; 2	ASS2; 2	SAC1; 4	SAC2; 1	**BRN1**; 1	**BRN2**; Ret	SIL1; 2	SIL2; 11	MIS; Ret	ARA1; 6	ARA2; 1		2nd	194

=== Grand Prix motorcycle racing ===
==== By season ====
Season	Class	Motorcycle	Team	Race	Win	Podium	Pole	FLap	Pts	Plcd
2015	Moto3	Honda	Gresini Racing Moto3	1	0	0	0	0	0	NC
2016	Moto3	Honda	Gresini Racing Moto3	18	0	3	0	0	134	6th
2017	Moto3	Honda	Del Conca Gresini Moto3	18	0	5	0	2	153	5th
2018	Moto3	Honda	Del Conca Gresini Moto3	18	2	6	0	1	218	**2nd**
2019	Moto2	Speed Up	Speed Up Racing	19	0	2	1	0	108	9th
2020	Moto2	Speed Up	Speed Up Racing	15	0	2	0	0	65	15th
2021	Moto2	Kalex	Federal Oil Gresini Moto2	18	1	4	0	0	161	7th
2022	MotoGP	Ducati	Gresini Racing MotoGP	20	0	0	1	0	24	20th
2023	MotoGP	Ducati	Gresini Racing MotoGP	20	1	2	0	0	151	12th
2024	MotoGP	Ducati	Pertamina Enduro VR46 Racing Team	17	0	0	0	1	165	10th
2025	MotoGP	Ducati	Pertamina Enduro VR46 Racing Team	22	0	4	0	0	262	6th
2026	MotoGP	Ducati	Pertamina Enduro VR46 Racing Team	6	1	3	2	1	116*	**3rd***
Total				**192**	**5**	**31**	**4**	**5**	**1557**	

==== By class ====
Class	Seasons	1st GP	1st pod	1st win	Race	Win	Podiums	Pole	FLap	Pts	WChmp
Moto3	2015–2018	2015 Valencia	2016 Italy	2018 Czech Republic	55	2	14	0	3	505	0
Moto2	2019–2021	2019 Qatar	2019 Czech Republic	2021 Spain	52	1	8	1	0	334	0
MotoGP	2022–present	2022 Qatar	2023 Australia	2023 Qatar	85	2	9	3	2	718	0
Total	2012–present				**192**	**5**	**31**	**4**	**5**	**1557**	**0**

==== Races by year ====
(key) (Races in bold indicate pole position; races in italics indicate fastest lap; ^{superscript} indicates point-scoring sprint position)

Year	Class	Bike	1	2	3	4	5	6	7	8	9	10	11	12	13	14	15	16	17	18	19	20	21	22	Pos	Pts
2015	Moto3	Honda	QAT	AME	ARG	SPA	FRA	ITA	CAT	NED	GER	INP	CZE	GBR	RSM	ARA	JPN	AUS	MAL	VAL; 23					NC	0
2016	Moto3	Honda	QAT; 26	ARG; 25	AME; 17	SPA; Ret	FRA; 17	ITA; 2	CAT; 9	NED; 2	GER; 5	AUT; 8	CZE; 3	GBR; 6	RSM; 10	ARA; 4	JPN; 5	AUS; Ret	MAL; 15	VAL; 5					6th	134
2017	Moto3	Honda	QAT; 8	ARG; Ret	AME; 3	SPA; 5	FRA; 3	ITA; 2	CAT; 7	NED; Ret	GER; 11	CZE; 21	AUT; 6	GBR; 10	RSM; 3	ARA; 2	JPN; 7	AUS; Ret	MAL; 9	VAL; Ret					5th	153
2018	Moto3	Honda	QAT; 6	ARG; 3	AME; 5	SPA; 7	FRA; 4	ITA; 3	CAT; 7	NED; 9	GER; Ret	CZE; 1	AUT; 11	GBR; C	RSM; 3	ARA; 4	THA; 1	JPN; Ret	AUS; 2	MAL; 6	VAL; 4				2nd	218
2019	Moto2	Speed Up	QAT; 11	ARG; Ret	AME; Ret	SPA; 12	FRA; 12	ITA; 10	CAT; Ret	NED; 11	GER; 4	CZE; 2	AUT; 14	GBR; 6	**RSM**; 2	ARA; 11	THA; 18	JPN; 11	AUS; 14	MAL; Ret	VAL; 9				9th	108
2020	Moto2	Speed Up	QAT; 13	SPA; Ret	ANC; 18	CZE; 16	AUT; 21	STY; 18	RSM; 7	EMI; 8	CAT; 3	FRA; 7	ARA; Ret	TER; 2	EUR; Ret	VAL; Ret	POR; Ret								15th	65
2021	Moto2	Kalex	QAT; 3	DOH; 10	POR; 11	SPA; 1	FRA; 8	ITA; Ret	CAT; Ret	GER; 4	NED; Ret	STY; 13	AUT; 12	GBR; 5	ARA; 6	RSM; 9	AME; 2	EMI; 8	ALR; 11	VAL; 2					7th	161
2022	MotoGP	Ducati	QAT; 17	INA; 18	ARG; Ret	AME; 21	POR; Ret	SPA; 18	FRA; 13	**ITA**; 11	CAT; Ret	GER; 8	NED; 14	GBR; 22	AUT; 11	RSM; 20	ARA; 19	JPN; 17	THA; 18	AUS; 20	MAL; Ret	VAL; 15			20th	24
2023	MotoGP	Ducati	POR; Ret	ARG; 10	AME; 9	SPA; 12	FRA; 8	ITA; 14	GER; 9	NED; Ret	GBR; 13	AUT; 17	CAT; 10	RSM; 17	IND; Ret	JPN; 8^{8}	INA; 4^{6}	AUS; 3	THA; 9	MAL; 9	QAT; 1^{2}	VAL; 4^{6}			12th	151
2024	MotoGP	Ducati	QAT; 7	POR; 10	AME; 6	SPA; 7	FRA; 6^{7}	CAT; 5^{6}	ITA; 7^{7}	NED; 4^{5}	GER; Ret	GBR; 5	AUT; DNS	ARA; 8	RSM; 9	EMI; 14	INA; Ret^{9}	JPN; 8^{6}	AUS; 4^{7}	THA; 4^{8}	MAL	SLD			10th	165
2025	MotoGP	Ducati	THA; 10	ARG; 5^{5}	AME; 3^{4}	QAT; 16^{6}	SPA; 5^{6}	FRA; 8^{7}	GBR; 9^{3}	ARA; 9^{6}	ITA; 3^{5}	NED; 6^{4}	GER; Ret^{4}	CZE; 16	AUT; Ret^{8}	HUN; 15^{2}	CAT; Ret^{3}	RSM; 5^{3}	JPN; 13	INA; 9^{8}	AUS; 2^{5}	MAL; 6	POR; 8^{5}	VAL; 3^{3}	6th	262
2026	MotoGP	Ducati	THA; 6^{8}	**BRA**; 3^{2}	**USA**; 4	SPA; 3^{5}	FRA; 4	CAT; 1^{3}	ITA; 5^{3}	HUN; 12	CZE; 4^{4}	NED; 4^{3}	GER; Ret^{3}	GBR; 6^{5}	ARA; 7	RSM; 9^{6}	AUT	JPN	INA	AUS	MAL	QAT	POR	VAL	4th*	223*

* Season still in progress.
