= 2022 Thailand motorcycle Grand Prix =

Seventeenth round of the 2022 Grand Prix motorcycle racing season

2022 Thailand Grand Prix
Race details
- Race 17 of 20 races in the 2022 Grand Prix motorcycle racing season
- Date: 2 October 2022
- Official name: OR Thailand Grand Prix
- Location: Chang International Circuit; Buriram, Thailand
- Course: Permanent racing facility; 4.554 km (2.830 mi)

MotoGP
Pole position
Rider	(Italy) Marco Bezzecchi	Ducati
Time	1:29.671	
Fastest lap
Rider	(France) Johann Zarco	Ducati
Time	1:38.941 on lap 19	
Podium
First	(Portugal) Miguel Oliveira	KTM
Second	(Australia) Jack Miller	Ducati
Third	(Italy) Francesco Bagnaia	Ducati

Moto2
Pole position
Rider	(Thailand) Somkiat Chantra	Kalex
Time	1:35.625	
Fastest lap
Rider	(Italy) Tony Arbolino	Kalex
Time	1:52.003 on lap 7	
Podium
First	(Italy) Tony Arbolino	Kalex
Second	(Czech Republic) Filip Salač	Kalex
Third	(Spain) Arón Canet	Kalex

Moto3
Pole position
Rider	(Italy) Dennis Foggia	Honda
Time	1:42.077	
Fastest lap
Rider	(Spain) Jaume Masià	KTM
Time	1:42.530 on lap 5	
Podium
First	(Italy) Dennis Foggia	Honda
Second	(Japan) Ayumu Sasaki	Husqvarna
Third	(Italy) Riccardo Rossi	Honda

The 2022 Thailand motorcycle Grand Prix (officially known as the OR Thailand Grand Prix) was the seventeenth round of the 2022 Grand Prix motorcycle racing season. It was held at the Chang International Circuit in Buriram on 2 October 2022.

The Grand Prix returned to Thailand after absences in 2020 and 2021 in response to the COVID-19 pandemic.

== Background ==
=== Riders' entries ===
In the MotoGP class, Joan Mir has not yet recovered from his ankle injury. The Suzuki Ecstar Team has decided to replace him in this Grand Prix with Danilo Petrucci, from the MotoAmerica Superbike Championship, and who until last year was racing in the premier class with the KTM of Team Tech3. Takaaki Nakagami skips this round to undergo surgery on his injured finger that he underwent during the Aragon round and is replaced by Tetsuta Nagashima in LCR Honda. In the Moto2 class, the now retired Gabriel Rodrigo continues to be replaced with Taiga Hada in the Pertamina Mandalika SAG Team. In the Moto3 class, in addition to Nicola Carraro who continues to substitute the injured Matteo Bertelle in the QJmotor Avintia Racing Team, there is a new replacement in the Rivacold Snipers Team against the convalescent Alberto Surra: it is Vicente Pérez, who had not raced in this category since the 2019 Catalan Grand Prix.

=== MotoGP Championship standings before the race ===
Fabio Quartararo, taking advantage of Francesco Bagnaia's fall and Aleix Espargaró's arrival out of the points zone in the previous race, increases his advantage in the riders' classification, which he leads with 219 points, to +18 and +25 compared to the Italian respectively and some Spanish. Enea Bastianini is fourth with 170 points, followed by Jack Miller, winner at Motegi, with 159 points. In the constructors category, Ducati, already champion, dominates with 371 points; followed by Aprilia (226 points), Yamaha (221 points), KTM (181 points), Suzuki (134 points) and Honda (113 points). In the team standings, Ducati Lenovo Team is first with 360 points, with a 53-point advantage over Aprilia Racing; followed by Prima Pramac Racing (258 points) and Red Bull KTM Factory Racing (254 points) which overtake Monster Energy Yamaha MotoGP (247 points).

=== Moto2 Championship standings before the race ===
The victory in the home Grand Prix by Ai Ogura ahead of Augusto Fernández allows the Japanese to reduce the gap to two points from the top of the riders' standings (234 points for Fernández, 232 for Ogura). Arón Canet and Celestino Vietti lose ground, both fallen in Motegi: now they are 57 and 72 points behind the summit. Tony Arbolino is fifth with 138 points. The constructors' classification states: Kalex (champion) 395 points, Boscoscuro 137 points, MV Agusta 5 points. In the team standings, Red Bull KTM Ajo leads with 366 points, with a 14-point lead over Idemitsu Honda Team. Flexbox HP40 is third at 260, Shimoko GasGas Aspar Team and Elf Marc VDS Racing Team are fourth and fifth respectively at 194 and 189 points.

=== Moto3 Championship standings before the race ===
The victory in the Japanese Grand Prix allowed Izan Guevara, now at 254 points, to increase the lead in the riders' classification over his rivals: Sergio García and Dennis Foggia are now respectively 45 and 63 points behind the top. Ayumu Sasaki is fourth with 174 points, followed by Jaume Masià with 155 points. In the constructors' classification, Gas Gas leads with 312 points, followed by Honda (275 points), KTM (257 points), Husqvarna (210 points), CFMoto (115 points). In the team classification, AutoSolar GasGas Aspar Team is one step away from the title: it is first at 463 points, +144 on Leopard Racing. Red Bull KTM Ajo is third with 238 points, with just a two-point lead over Sterilgarda Husqvarna Max, while Red Bull KTM Tech3 is fifth with 194 points.

== Qualifying ==
=== MotoGP ===
Fastest session lap

Pos.	No.	Biker	Constructor	Qualifying times		Final grid	Row
Pos.	No.	Biker	Constructor	Q1	Q2	Final grid	Row
1	72	(Italy) Marco Bezzecchi	Ducati	Qualified in Q2	1:29.671	1	1
2	89	(Spain) Jorge Martín	Ducati	Qualified in Q2	1:29.692	2	1
3	63	(Italy) Francesco Bagnaia	Ducati	Qualified in Q2	1:29.775	3	1
4	20	(France) Fabio Quartararo	Yamaha	Qualified in Q2	1:29.909	4	2
5	5	(France) Johann Zarco	Ducati	Qualified in Q2	1:29.963	5	2
6	23	(Italy) Enea Bastianini	Ducati	Qualified in Q2	1:29.988	6	2
7	43	(Australia) Jack Miller	Ducati	Qualified in Q2	1:30.106	7	3
8	93	(Spain) Marc Márquez	Honda	1:30.038	1:30.133	8	3
9	10	(Italy) Luca Marini	Ducati	Qualified in Q2	1:30.214	9	3
10	42	(Spain) Álex Rins	Suzuki	Qualified in Q2	1:30.337	10	4
11	88	(Portugal) Miguel Oliveira	KTM	1:30.099	1:30.485	11	4
12	33	(South Africa) Brad Binder	KTM	Qualified in Q2	1:30.542	12	4
13	41	(Spain) Aleix Espargaró	Aprilia	1:30.202	N/A	13	5
14	21	(Italy) Franco Morbidelli	Yamaha	1:30.528	N/A	14	5
15	35	(United Kingdom) Cal Crutchlow	Yamaha	1:30.542	N/A	15	5
16	25	(Spain) Raúl Fernández	KTM	1:30.566	N/A	16	6
17	12	(Spain) Maverick Viñales	Aprilia	1:30.578	N/A	17	6
18	87	(Australia) Remy Gardner	KTM	1:30.602	N/A	18	6
19	44	(Spain) Pol Espargaró	Honda	1:30.641	N/A	19	7
20	73	(Spain) Álex Márquez	Honda	1:30.692	N/A	20	7
21	49	(Italy) Fabio Di Giannantonio	Ducati	1:30.794	N/A	21	7
22	45	(Japan) Tetsuta Nagashima	Honda	1:31.331	N/A	22	8
23	40	(South Africa) Darryn Binder	Yamaha	1:31.356	N/A	23	8
24	9	(Italy) Danilo Petrucci	Suzuki	1:31.604	N/A	24	8
OFFICIAL MOTOGP QUALIFYING RESULTS

=== Moto2 ===
Fastest session lap

Pos.	No.	Biker	Constructor	Qualifying times		Final grid	Row
Pos.	No.	Biker	Constructor	Q1	Q2	Final grid	Row
1	35	(Thailand) Somkiat Chantra	Kalex	Qualified in Q2	1:35.625	1	1
2	14	(Italy) Tony Arbolino	Kalex	Qualified in Q2	1:35.710	2	1
3	79	(Japan) Ai Ogura	Kalex	Qualified in Q2	1:35.889	3	1
4	51	(Spain) Pedro Acosta	Kalex	Qualified in Q2	1:35.956	4	2
5	13	(Italy) Celestino Vietti	Kalex	1:36.038	1:35.973	5	2
6	21	(Spain) Alonso López	Boscoscuro	Qualified in Q2	1:35.987	6	2
7	96	(United Kingdom) Jake Dixon	Kalex	Qualified in Q2	1:36.106	7	3
8	37	(Spain) Augusto Fernández	Kalex	Qualified in Q2	1:36.130	8	3
9	9	(Spain) Jorge Navarro	Kalex	Qualified in Q2	1.36.264	9	3
10	18	(Spain) Manuel González	Kalex	Qualified in Q2	1:36.316	10	4
11	6	(United States) Cameron Beaubier	Kalex	Qualified in Q2	1:36.558	11	4
12	12	(Czech Republic) Filip Salač	Kalex	Qualified in Q2	1:36.672	12	4
13	64	(Netherlands) Bo Bendsneyder	Kalex	1:36.231	1:36.809	13	5
14	52	(Spain) Jeremy Alcoba	Kalex	Qualified in Q2	1:36.843	14	5
15	75	(Spain) Albert Arenas	Kalex	Qualified in Q2	1:36.914	15	5
16	81	(Thailand) Keminth Kubo	Kalex	1:36.166	1:37.360	16	6
17	16	(United States) Joe Roberts	Kalex	1:36.343	1:38.065	17	6
18	40	(Spain) Arón Canet	Kalex	Qualified in Q2	N/A	18	6
19	22	(United Kingdom) Sam Lowes	Kalex	1:36.360	N/A	19	7
20	19	(Italy) Lorenzo Dalla Porta	Kalex	1:36.474	N/A	20	7
21	54	(Spain) Fermín Aldeguer	Boscoscuro	1:36.507	N/A	21	7
22	23	(Germany) Marcel Schrötter	Kalex	1:36.567	N/A	22	8
23	7	(Belgium) Barry Baltus	Kalex	1:36.732	N/A	23	8
24	84	(Netherlands) Zonta van den Goorbergh	Kalex	1:36.816	N/A	24	8
25	61	(Italy) Alessandro Zaccone	Kalex	1:36.869	N/A	25	9
26	4	(United States) Sean Dylan Kelly	Kalex	1.37.074	N/A	26	9
27	42	(Spain) Marcos Ramírez	MV Agusta	1:37.206	N/A	27	9
28	28	(Italy) Niccolò Antonelli	Kalex	1:37.264	N/A	28	10
29	29	(Japan) Taiga Hada	Kalex	1:37.279	N/A	29	10
30	24	(Italy) Simone Corsi	MV Agusta	N/A	N/A	30	10
OFFICIAL MOTO2 QUALIFYING RESULTS

=== Moto3 ===
Fastest session lap

Pos.	No.	Biker	Constructor	Qualifying times		Final grid	Row
Pos.	No.	Biker	Constructor	Q1	Q2	Final grid	Row
1	7	(Italy) Dennis Foggia	Honda	Qualified in Q2	1:42.077	1	1
2	5	(Spain) Jaume Masià	KTM	Qualified in Q2	1:42.369	2	1
3	71	(Japan) Ayumu Sasaki	Husqvarna	Qualified in Q2	1:42.486	3	1
4	82	(Italy) Stefano Nepa	KTM	Qualified in Q2	1:42.531	4	2
5	10	(Brazil) Diogo Moreira	KTM	Qualified in Q2	1:42.716	5	2
6	96	(Spain) Daniel Holgado	KTM	Qualified in Q2	1:42.740	6	2
7	54	(Italy) Riccardo Rossi	Honda	Qualified in Q2	1:42.847	7	3
8	17	(United Kingdom) John McPhee	Husqvarna	Qualified in Q2	1:42.906	8	3
9	6	(Japan) Ryusei Yamanaka	KTM	Qualified in Q2	1.42.986	9	3
10	44	(Spain) David Muñoz	KTM	1:42.992	1:43.031	10	4
11	28	(Spain) Izan Guevara	Gas Gas	1:42.926	1:43.047	11	4
12	66	(Australia) Joel Kelso	KTM	Qualified in Q2	1:43.129	12	4
13	72	(Japan) Taiyo Furusato	Honda	1:42.980	1:43.167	13	5
14	16	(Italy) Andrea Migno	Honda	Qualified in Q2	1:43.221	14	5
15	20	(France) Lorenzo Fellon	Honda	1:42.813	1:43.387	15	5
16	53	(Turkey) Deniz Öncü	KTM	Qualified in Q2	1:43.407	16	6
17	27	(Japan) Kaito Toba	KTM	Qualified in Q2	1:43.824	17	6
18	24	(Japan) Tatsuki Suzuki	Honda	Qualified in Q2	1:44.167	18	6
19	31	(Spain) Adrián Fernández	KTM	1:43.134	N/A	19	7
20	11	(Spain) Sergio García	Gas Gas	1:43.140	N/A	20	7
21	23	(Italy) Elia Bartolini	KTM	1:43.215	N/A	21	7
22	19	(United Kingdom) Scott Ogden	Honda	1:43.253	N/A	22	8
23	99	(Spain) Carlos Tatay	CFMoto	1:43.408	N/A	23	8
24	43	(Spain) Xavier Artigas	CFMoto	1:43.573	N/A	24	8
25	48	(Spain) Iván Ortolá	KTM	1:43.760	N/A	25	9
26	21	(Spain) Vicente Pérez	Honda	1:43.829	N/A	26	9
27	70	(United Kingdom) Joshua Whatley	Honda	1:43.982	N/A	27	9
28	22	(Spain) Ana Carrasco	KTM	1:44.062	N/A	28	10
29	64	(Indonesia) Mario Aji	Honda	1:44.920	N/A	29	10
30	9	(Italy) Nicola Carraro	KTM	2:05.528	N/A	30	10
OFFICIAL MOTO3 QUALIFYING RESULTS

== Race ==
=== MotoGP ===
Pos.	No.	Biker	Team	Constructor	Laps	Time/Retired	Grid	Points
1	88	(Portugal) Miguel Oliveira	Red Bull KTM Factory Racing	KTM	25	41:44.503	11	25
2	43	(Australia) Jack Miller	Ducati Lenovo Team	Ducati	25	+0.730	7	20
3	63	(Italy) Francesco Bagnaia	Ducati Lenovo Team	Ducati	25	+1.968	3	16
4	5	(France) Johann Zarco	Prima Pramac Racing	Ducati	25	+2.490	5	13
5	93	(Spain) Marc Márquez	Repsol Honda Team	Honda	25	+2.958	8	11
6	23	(Italy) Enea Bastianini	Gresini Racing MotoGP	Ducati	25	+13.257	6	10
7	12	(Spain) Maverick Viñales	Aprilia Racing	Aprilia	25	+14.566	17	9
8	73	(Spain) Álex Márquez	LCR Honda Castrol	Honda	25	+14.861	20	8
9	89	(Spain) Jorge Martín	Prima Pramac Racing	Ducati	25	+15.365	2	7
10	33	(South Africa) Brad Binder	Red Bull KTM Factory Racing	KTM	25	+18.097	12	6
11	41	(Spain) Aleix Espargaró	Aprilia Racing	Aprilia	25	+19.041	13	5
12	42	(Spain) Álex Rins	Team Suzuki Ecstar	Suzuki	25	+19.659	10	4
13	21	(Italy) Franco Morbidelli	Monster Energy Yamaha MotoGP	Yamaha	25	+22.439	14	3
14	44	(Spain) Pol Espargaró	Repsol Honda Team	Honda	25	+23.646	19	2
15	25	(Spain) Raúl Fernández	Tech3 KTM Factory Racing	KTM	25	+30.483	16	1
16	72	(Italy) Marco Bezzecchi	Mooney VR46 Racing Team	Ducati	25	+33.466	1	
17	20	(France) Fabio Quartararo	Monster Energy Yamaha MotoGP	Yamaha	25	+34.072	4	
18	49	(Italy) Fabio Di Giannantonio	Gresini Racing MotoGP	Ducati	25	+36.203	21	
19	35	(United Kingdom) Cal Crutchlow	WithU Yamaha RNF MotoGP Team	Yamaha	25	+36.532	15	
20	9	(Italy) Danilo Petrucci	Team Suzuki Ecstar	Suzuki	25	+42.508	24	
21	40	(South Africa) Darryn Binder	WithU Yamaha RNF MotoGP Team	Yamaha	25	+49.992	23	
22	45	(Japan) Tetsuta Nagashima	LCR Honda Idemitsu	Honda	25	+51.346	22	
23	10	(Italy) Luca Marini	Mooney VR46 Racing Team	Ducati	23	+2 laps	9	
Ret	87	(Australia) Remy Gardner	Tech3 KTM Factory Racing	KTM	11	Accident	18	
Fastest lap: (France) Johann Zarco (Ducati) – 1:38.941 (lap 19)
OFFICIAL MOTOGP RACE REPORT

=== Moto2 ===
The race was originally scheduled to be run for 24 laps, but was initially shortened to 16 laps amid bad weather conditions. After heavier rainfall, race direction red-flagged the race after 8 full laps and decided not to restart the race. As a consequence, half points were awarded after failing to complete 2/3 of the race distance.

Pos.	No.	Biker	Constructor	Laps	Time/Retired	Grid	Points
1	14	(Italy) Tony Arbolino	Kalex	8	15:10.854	2	12.5
2	12	(Czech Republic) Filip Salač	Kalex	8	+0.251	12	10
3	40	(Spain) Arón Canet	Kalex	8	+3.112	18	8
4	96	(United Kingdom) Jake Dixon	Kalex	8	+3.268	7	6.5
5	21	(Spain) Alonso López	Boscoscuro	8	+4.137	6	5.5
6	79	(Japan) Ai Ogura	Kalex	8	+5.715	3	5
7	37	(Spain) Augusto Fernández	Kalex	8	+9.862	8	4.5
8	16	(United States) Joe Roberts	Kalex	7	+1 lap	17	4
9	81	(Thailand) Keminth Kubo	Kalex	7	+1 lap	16	3.5
10	13	(Italy) Celestino Vietti	Kalex	7	+1 lap	5	3
11	4	(United States) Sean Dylan Kelly	Kalex	7	+1 lap	26	2.5
12	7	(Belgium) Barry Baltus	Kalex	7	+1 lap	23	2
13	29	(Japan) Taiga Hada	Kalex	7	+1 lap	29	1.5
14	75	(Spain) Albert Arenas	Kalex	7	+1 lap	15	1
15	23	(Germany) Marcel Schrötter	Kalex	7	+1 lap	22	0.5
16	51	(Spain) Pedro Acosta	Kalex	7	+1 lap	4	
17	84	(Netherlands) Zonta van den Goorbergh	Kalex	7	+1 lap	24	
18	64	(Netherlands) Bo Bendsneyder	Kalex	7	+1 lap	13	
19	22	(United Kingdom) Sam Lowes	Kalex	7	+1 lap	19	
20	9	(Spain) Jorge Navarro	Kalex	7	+1 lap	9	
21	61	(Italy) Alessandro Zaccone	Kalex	7	+1 lap	25	
22	28	(Italy) Niccolò Antonelli	Kalex	7	+1 lap	28	
23	42	(Spain) Marcos Ramírez	MV Agusta	7	+1 lap	27	
24	24	(Italy) Simone Corsi	MV Agusta	7	+1 lap	30	
25	18	(Spain) Manuel González	Kalex	6	+2 laps	10	
Ret	19	(Italy) Lorenzo Dalla Porta	Kalex	5	Handling	20	
Ret	52	(Spain) Jeremy Alcoba	Kalex	4	Accident Damage	14	
Ret	35	(Thailand) Somkiat Chantra	Kalex	1	Accident	1	
Ret	54	(Spain) Fermín Aldeguer	Boscoscuro	1	Accident	21	
Ret	6	(United States) Cameron Beaubier	Kalex	0	Accident	11	
Fastest lap: (Italy) Tony Arbolino (Kalex) – 1:52.003 (lap 7)
OFFICIAL MOTO2 RACE REPORT

=== Moto3 ===
Pos.	No.	Biker	Constructor	Laps	Time/Retired	Grid	Points
1	7	(Italy) Dennis Foggia	Honda	22	37:52.331	1	25
2	71	(Japan) Ayumu Sasaki	Husqvarna	22	+1.524	3	20
3	54	(Italy) Riccardo Rossi	Honda	22	+2.804	7	16
4	82	(Italy) Stefano Nepa	KTM	22	+9.414	4	13
5	28	(Spain) Izan Guevara	Gas Gas	22	+9.527	11	11
6	10	(Brazil) Diogo Moreira	KTM	22	+9.971	5	10
7 (Note: 1-position penalty for exceeding track limits.)	16	(Italy) Andrea Migno	Honda	22	+9.610	14	9
8	5	(Spain) Jaume Masià	KTM	22	+10.033	2	8
9	44	(Spain) David Muñoz	KTM	22	+10.046	10	7
10	6	(Japan) Ryusei Yamanaka	KTM	22	+10.088	9	6
11	96	(Spain) Daniel Holgado	KTM	22	+14.571	6	5
12	66	(Australia) Joel Kelso	KTM	22	+23.432	12	4
13	99	(Spain) Carlos Tatay	CFMoto	22	+23.763	23	3
14	43	(Spain) Xavier Artigas	CFMoto	22	+23.842	24	2
15	19	(United Kingdom) Scott Ogden	Honda	22	+23.868	22	1
16	20	(France) Lorenzo Fellon	Honda	22	+24.232	15	
17	53	(Turkey) Deniz Öncü	KTM	22	+24.055	16	
18	23	(Italy) Elia Bartolini	KTM	22	+40.092	21	
19	21	(Spain) Vicente Pérez	Honda	22	+40.094	26	
20	48	(Spain) Iván Ortolá	KTM	22	+40.228	25	
21	64	(Indonesia) Mario Aji	Honda	22	+40.366	29	
22	22	(Spain) Ana Carrasco	KTM	22	+43.876	28	
23	70	(United Kingdom) Joshua Whatley	Honda	22	+48.480	27	
24	9	(Italy) Nicola Carraro	KTM	22	+54.747	30	
25	72	(Japan) Taiyo Furusato	Honda	19	+3 laps	13	
Ret	11	(Spain) Sergio García	Gas Gas	14	Accident Damage	20	
Ret	24	(Japan) Tatsuki Suzuki	Honda	7	Mechanical	18	
Ret	17	(United Kingdom) John McPhee	Husqvarna	7	Accident Damage	8	
Ret	27	(Japan) Kaito Toba	KTM	1	Accident	17	
Ret	31	(Spain) Adrián Fernández	Honda	0	Accident	19	
Fastest lap: (Spain) Jaume Masià (KTM) – 1:42.530 (lap 5)
OFFICIAL MOTO3 RACE REPORT

== Championship standings after the race ==
Below are the standings for the top five riders, constructors, and teams after the round.

=== MotoGP ===
Riders' Championship standings

Pos.	Rider	Points
1	(France) Fabio Quartararo	219
2	(Italy) Francesco Bagnaia	217
3	(Spain) Aleix Espargaró	199
4	(Italy) Enea Bastianini	180
5	(Australia) Jack Miller	179

Constructors' Championship standings

Pos.	Constructor	Points
1	(Italy) Ducati	391
2	(Italy) Aprilia	235
3	(Japan) Yamaha	224
4	(Austria) KTM	206
5	(Japan) Suzuki	138

Teams' Championship standings

	Pos.	Team	Points
	1	(Italy) Ducati Lenovo Team	396
	2	(Italy) Aprilia Racing	321
1	3	(Austria) Red Bull KTM Factory Racing	285
1	4	(Italy) Prima Pramac Racing	278
	5	(Japan) Monster Energy Yamaha MotoGP	250

=== Moto2 ===
Riders' Championship standings

Pos.	Rider	Points
1	(Spain) Augusto Fernández	238.5
2	(Japan) Ai Ogura	237
3	(Spain) Arón Canet	185
4	(Italy) Celestino Vietti	165
5	(Italy) Tony Arbolino	150.5

Constructors' Championship standings

Pos.	Constructor	Points
1	(Germany) Kalex	407.5
2	(Italy) Boscoscuro	142.5
3	(Italy) MV Agusta	5

Teams' Championship standings

	Pos.	Team	Points
	1	(Finland) Red Bull KTM Ajo	370.5
	2	(Japan) Idemitsu Honda Team Asia	357
	3	(Spain) Flexbox HP40	268
1	4	(Belgium) Elf Marc VDS Racing Team	201.5
1	5	(Spain) Inde GasGas Aspar Team	201.5

=== Moto3 ===
Riders' Championship standings

	Pos.	Rider	Points
	1	(Spain) Izan Guevara	265
1	2	(Italy) Dennis Foggia	216
1	3	(Spain) Sergio García	209
	4	(Japan) Ayumu Sasaki	194
	5	(Spain) Jaume Masià	163

Constructors' Championship standings

Pos.	Constructor	Points
1	(Spain) Gas Gas	323
2	(Japan) Honda	300
3	(Austria) KTM	270
4	(Sweden) Husqvarna	230
5	(China) CFMoto	118

Teams' Championship standings

	Pos.	Team	Points
	1	(Spain) Gaviota GasGas Aspar Team	474
	2	(Luxembourg) Leopard Racing	344
1	3	(Italy) Sterilgarda Husqvarna Max	256
1	4	(Finland) Red Bull KTM Ajo	251
	5	(France) Red Bull KTM Tech3	194

== Notes ==
Previous race: 2022 Japanese Grand Prix	FIM Grand Prix World Championship; 2022 season	Next race: 2022 Australian Grand Prix
Previous race: 2019 Thailand Grand Prix	Thailand motorcycle Grand Prix	Next race: 2023 Thailand Grand Prix
