= 2025 Italian motorcycle Grand Prix =

Motorcycle race in Scarperia e San Piero

(Italy) 2025 Italian Grand Prix
Race details
- Race 9 of 22 races in the 2025 Grand Prix motorcycle racing season
- Date: 22 June 2025
- Official name: Brembo Grand Prix of Italy
- Location: Autodromo Internazionale del Mugello; Scarperia e San Piero, Italy
- Course: Permanent racing facility; 5.245 km (3.259 mi)

MotoGP
Pole position
Rider	(Spain) Marc Márquez	Ducati
Time	1:44.169	
Fastest lap
Rider	(Italy) Franco Morbidelli	Ducati
Time	1:46.474 on lap 2	
Podium
First	(Spain) Marc Márquez	Ducati
Second	(Spain) Álex Márquez	Ducati
Third	(Italy) Fabio Di Giannantonio	Ducati

Moto2
Pole position
Rider	(Brazil) Diogo Moreira	Kalex
Time	1:49.745	
Fastest lap
Rider	(Spain) Manuel González	Kalex
Time	1:50.816 on lap 2	
Podium
First	(Spain) Manuel González	Kalex
Second	(Spain) Albert Arenas	Kalex
Third	(Spain) Arón Canet	Kalex

Moto3
Pole position
Rider	(Spain) Álvaro Carpe	KTM
Time	1:54.733	
Fastest lap
Rider	(Spain) David Muñoz	KTM
Time	1:55.805 on lap 12	
Podium
First	(Spain) Máximo Quiles	KTM
Second	(Spain) Álvaro Carpe	KTM
Third	(Italy) Dennis Foggia	KTM

The 2025 Italian motorcycle Grand Prix (officially known as the Brembo Grand Prix of Italy) was the ninth round of the 2025 Grand Prix motorcycle racing season. All races were held at the Autodromo Internazionale del Mugello in Scarperia e San Piero on 22 June 2025.

Takaaki Nakagami will stand in for Luca Marini in the Honda HRC Castrol ranks at the Brembo Grand Prix of Italy this weekend as the Italian continues his recovery process. Nakagami will make his second Grand Prix appearance of the season.

Spanish Moto2 rider Sergio García and The MSi Racing Team have decided to part ways amicably after the Aragon Grand Prix. The Spanish rider will therefore not participate in the Italian Grand Prix this weekend. He will be replaced by Catalan rider Eric Fernández. Nakarin Atiratphuvapat replaced the injured Mario Aji for Honda Team Asia yet another Grand Prix as Aji had shoulder surgery.

In Moto3 Gryd-Mlav racing announced that Spanish rider Vicente Pérez will be replacing Marcos Uriarte.

== Practice session ==
=== MotoGP ===
==== Combined Free Practice 1-2 ====
Fastest session lap

Pos.	No.	Biker	Team	Constructor	Practice times	
Pos.	No.	Biker	Team	Constructor	P1	P2
1	12	**(Spain)** Maverick Viñales	Red Bull KTM Tech3	KTM	1:46.648	**1:45.742**
2	93	(Spain) Marc Márquez	Ducati Lenovo Team	Ducati	1:46.293	1:45.758
3	20	(France) Fabio Quartararo	Monster Energy Yamaha MotoGP Team	Yamaha	1:46.615	1:45.846
4	73	(Spain) Álex Márquez	BK8 Gresini Racing MotoGP	Ducati	1:46.706	1:45.952
5	37	(Spain) Pedro Acosta	Red Bull KTM Factory Racing	KTM	1:46.199	1:45.974
6	49	**(Italy)** Fabio Di Giannantonio	Pertamina Enduro VR46 Racing Team	Ducati	1:46.586	1:46.021
7	72	**(Italy)** Marco Bezzecchi	Aprilia Racing	Aprilia	**1:46.199**	1:46.060
8	21	**(Italy)** Franco Morbidelli	Pertamina Enduro VR46 Racing Team	Ducati	1:46.974	1:46.062
9	54	**(Spain)** Fermín Aldeguer	BK8 Gresini Racing MotoGP	Ducati	1:47.323	1:46.090
10	63	**(Italy)** Francesco Bagnaia	Ducati Lenovo Team	Ducati	1:46.651	1:46.190
11	33	(South Africa) Brad Binder	Red Bull KTM Factory Racing	KTM	1:46.252	1:46.526
12	23	(Italy) Enea Bastianini	Red Bull KTM Tech3	KTM	1:47.275	1:46.387
13	36	(Spain) Joan Mir	Honda HRC Castrol	Honda	1:47.818	1:46.454
14	30	(Japan) Takaaki Nakagami	Honda HRC Castrol	Honda	1:47.292	1:46.468
15	79	(Japan) Ai Ogura	Trackhouse MotoGP Team	Aprilia	1:47.049	1:46.572
16	25	(Spain) Raúl Fernández	Trackhouse MotoGP Team	Aprilia	1:47.443	1:46.644
17	88	(Portugal) Miguel Oliveira	Prima Pramac Yamaha MotoGP	Yamaha	1:46.953	1:46.649
18	5	(France) Johann Zarco	Castrol Honda LCR	Honda	1:46.856	1:46.675
19	42	(Spain) Álex Rins	Monster Energy Yamaha MotoGP Team	Yamaha	1:46.915	1:46.689
20	43	(Australia) Jack Miller	Prima Pramac Yamaha MotoGP	Yamaha	1:46.898	1:46.909
21	32	(Spain) Lorenzo Savadori	Aprilia Racing	Aprilia	1:48.098	1:47.324
22	35	(Thailand) Somkiat Chantra	IDEMITSU Honda LCR	Honda	1:47.888	1:48.072
OFFICIAL MOTOGP COMBINED PRACTICE TIMES REPORT

==== Practice ====
The top ten riders (written in bold) qualified for Q2.

Pos.	No.	Biker	Team	Constructor	
Pos.	No.	Biker	Team	Constructor	Time results
1	12	**(Spain) Maverick Viñales**	**Red Bull KTM Tech3**	**KTM**	**1:44.634**
2	63	**(Italy) Francesco Bagnaia**	**Ducati Lenovo Team**	**Ducati**	1:44.744
3	93	**(Spain) Marc Márquez**	**Ducati Lenovo Team**	**Ducati**	1:44.780
4	73	**(Spain) Álex Márquez**	**BK8 Gresini Racing MotoGP**	**Ducati**	1:44.787
5	20	**(France) Fabio Quartararo**	**Monster Energy Yamaha MotoGP Team**	**Yamaha**	1:44.945
6	72	**(Italy) Marco Bezzecchi**	**Aprilia Racing**	**Aprilia**	1:44.995
7	42	**(Spain) Álex Rins**	**Monster Energy Yamaha MotoGP Team**	**Yamaha**	1:45.084
8	37	**(Spain) Pedro Acosta**	**Red Bull KTM Factory Racing**	**KTM**	1:45.100
9	21	**(Italy) Franco Morbidelli**	**Pertamina Enduro VR46 Racing Team**	**Ducati**	1:45.144
10	49	**(Italy) Fabio Di Giannantonio**	**Pertamina Enduro VR46 Racing Team**	**Ducati**	1:45.279
11	88	(Portugal) Miguel Oliveira	Prima Pramac Yamaha MotoGP	Yamaha	1:45.404
12	23	(Italy) Enea Bastianini	Red Bull KTM Tech3	KTM	1:45.405
13	43	(Australia) Jack Miller	Prima Pramac Yamaha MotoGP	Yamaha	1:45.441
14	25	(Spain) Raúl Fernández	Trackhouse MotoGP Team	Aprilia	1:45.486
15	54	(Spain) Fermín Aldeguer	BK8 Gresini Racing MotoGP	Ducati	1:45.610
16	36	(Spain) Joan Mir	Honda HRC Castrol	Honda	1:45.652
17	5	(France) Johann Zarco	CASTROL Honda LCR	Honda	1:45.881
18	33	(South Africa) Brad Binder	Red Bull KTM Factory Racing	KTM	1:45.898
19	79	(Japan) Ai Ogura	Trackhouse MotoGP Team	Aprilia	1:45.998
20	30	(Japan) Takaaki Nakagami	Honda HRC Castrol	Honda	1:46.068
21	32	(Italy) Lorenzo Savadori	Aprilia Racing	Aprilia	1:46.341
22	35	(Thailand) Somkiat Chantra	IDEMITSU Honda LCR	Honda	1:47.327
OFFICIAL MOTOGP PRACTICE TIMES REPORT

=== Moto2 ===
==== Combined Practice 1-2 ====
Fastest session lap

Pos.	No.	Biker	Team	Constructor	Practice times	
Pos.	No.	Biker	Team	Constructor	P1	P2
1	18	(Spain) Manuel González	Liqui Moly Dynavolt Intact GP	Kalex	**1:50.589**	**1:50.059**
2	53	(Turkey) Deniz Öncü	Red Bull KTM Ajo	Kalex	1:50.768	1:50.070
3	44	(Spain) Arón Canet	Fantic Racing Lino Sonego	Kalex	1:51.262	1:50.175
4	13	(Italy) Celestino Vietti	Beta Tools SpeedRS Team	Boscoscuro	1:50.677	1:50.206
5	75	(Spain) Albert Arenas	Italjet Gresini Moto2	Kalex	1:51.342	1:50.206
6	96	(United Kingdom) Jake Dixon	Elf Marc VDS Racing Team	Boscoscuro	1:50.629	1:50.228
7	14	(Italy) Tony Arbolino	Blu Cru Pramac Yamaha Moto2	Boscoscuro	1:51.320	1:50.365
8	28	(Spain) Izan Guevara	Blu Cru Pramac Yamaha Moto2	Boscoscuro	1:51.163	1:50.387
9	12	(Czech Republic) Filip Salač	Elf Marc VDS Racing Team	Boscoscuro	1:51.146	1:50.435
10	7	(Belgium) Barry Baltus	Fantic Racing Lino Sonego	Kalex	1:50.983	1:50.463
11	4	(Spain) Iván Ortolá	QJMotor – Frinsa – MSi	Boscoscuro	1:51.611	1:50.507
12	21	(Spain) Alonso López	Beta Tools SpeedRS Team	Boscoscuro	1:51.705	1:50.537
13	27	(Spain) Daniel Holgado	CFMoto Inde Aspar Team	Kalex	1:51.251	1:50.574
14	24	(Spain) Marcos Ramírez	OnlyFans American Racing Team	Kalex	1:51.251	1:50.579
15	84	(Netherlands) Zonta van den Goorbergh	RW-Idrofoglia Racing GP	Kalex	1:51.608	1:50.635
16	16	(United States) Joe Roberts	OnlyFans American Racing Team	Kalex	1:51.525	1:50.673
17	81	(Australia) Senna Agius	Liqui Moly Dynavolt Intact GP	Kalex	1:51.059	1:50.732
18	80	(Colombia) David Alonso	CFMoto Inde Aspar Team	Kalex	1:50.785	1:51.668
19	10	(Brazil) Diogo Moreira	Italtrans Racing Team	Kalex	1:52.111	1:50.929
20	15	(South Africa) Darryn Binder	Italjet Gresini Moto2	Kalex	1:51.823	1:51.027
21	71	(Japan) Ayumu Sasaki	RW-Idrofoglia Racing GP	Kalex	1:51.516	1:51.092
22	95	(Netherlands) Collin Veijer	Red Bull KTM Ajo	Kalex	1:53.169	1:51.266
23	99	(Spain) Adrián Huertas	Italtrans Racing Team	Kalex	1:52.284	1:51.287
24	9	(Spain) Jorge Navarro	Klint Forward Factory Team	Forward	1:52.160	1:51.584
25	92	(Japan) Yuki Kunii	Idemitsu Honda Team Asia	Kalex	1:53.695	1:51.595
26	11	(Spain) Alex Escrig	Klint Forward Factory Team	Forward	1:52.642	1:51.656
27	41	(Thailand) Nakarin Atiratphuvapat	Idemitsu Honda Team Asia	Kalex	1:54.501	1:52.933
28	61	(Spain) Eric Fernández	QJMotor – Frinsa – MSi	Boscoscuro	1:55.273	1:53.370
OFFICIAL MOTO2 FREE PRACTICE TIMES REPORT

==== Practice ====
The top 14 riders (written in bold) qualified for Q2.

Pos.	No.	Biker	Team	Constructor	Time results
Pos.	No.	Biker	Team	Constructor	P1
1	12	(Czech Republic) **Filip Salač**	**Elf Marc VDS Racing Team**	**Boscoscuro**	**1:50.208**
2	13	(Italy) **Celestino Vietti**	**Beta Tools SpeedRS Team**	**Boscoscuro**	1:50.288
3	18	(Spain) **Manuel González**	**Liqui Moly Dynavolt Intact GP**	**Kalex**	1:50.302
4	7	(Belgium) **Barry Baltus**	**Fantic Racing Lino Sonego**	**Kalex**	1:50.374
5	14	(Italy) **Tony Arbolino**	**Blu Cru Pramac Yamaha Moto2**	**Boscoscuro**	1:50.469
6	75	(Spain) **Albert Arenas**	**Italjet Gresini Moto2**	**Kalex**	1:50.574
7	27	(Spain) **Daniel Holgado**	**CFMoto European Privilege Aspar Team**	**Kalex**	1:50.600
8	21	(Spain) **Alonso López**	**Beta Tools SpeedRS Team**	**Boscoscuro**	1:50.645
9	96	(United Kingdom) **Jake Dixon**	**Elf Marc VDS Racing Team**	**Boscoscuro**	1:50.669
10	28	(Spain) **Izan Guevara**	**Blu Cru Pramac Yamaha Moto2**	**Boscoscuro**	1:50.772
11	24	(Spain) **Marcos Ramírez**	**OnlyFans American Racing Team**	**Kalex**	1:50.801
12	81	(Australia) **Senna Agius**	**Liqui Moly Dynavolt Intact GP**	**Kalex**	1:50.893
13	10	(Brazil) **Diogo Moreira**	**Italtrans Racing Team**	**Kalex**	1:50.907
14	44	(Spain) **Arón Canet**	**Fantic Racing Lino Sonego**	**Kalex**	1:50.908
15	53	(Turkey) Deniz Öncü	Red Bull KTM Ajo	Kalex	1:50.958
16	16	(United States) Joe Roberts	OnlyFans American Racing Team	Kalex	1:50.976
17	80	(Colombia) David Alonso	CFMoto European Privilege Aspar Team	Kalex	1:50.981
18	84	(Netherlands) Zonta van den Goorbergh	RW-Idrofoglia Racing GP	Kalex	1:51.092
19	71	(Japan) Ayumu Sasaki	RW-Idrofoglia Racing GP	Kalex	1:51.149
20	99	(Spain) Adrián Huertas	Italtrans Racing Team	Kalex	1:51.219
21	9	(Spain) Jorge Navarro	Klint Forward Factory Team	Forward	1:51.412
22	4	(Spain) Iván Ortolá	QJMotor – Frinsa – MSi	Boscoscuro	1:51.482
23	92	(Japan) Yuki Kunii	Idemitsu Honda Team Asia	Kalex	1:51.709
24	15	(South Africa) Darryn Binder	Italjet Gresini Moto2	Kalex	1:51.838
25	95	(Netherlands) Collin Veijer	Red Bull KTM Ajo	Kalex	1:52.225
26	41	(Thailand) Nakarin Atiratphuvapat	Idemitsu Honda Team Asia	Kalex	1:52.733
27	11	(Spain) Alex Escrig	Klint Forward Factory Team	Forward	1:53.302
28	61	(Spain) Eric Fernández	QJMotor – Frinsa – MSi	Boscoscuro	1:54.002
OFFICIAL MOTO2 PRACTICE TIMES REPORT

=== Moto3 ===
==== Combined Practice 1-2 ====
Fastest session lap

Pos.	No.	Biker	Team	Constructor	Practice times	
Pos.	No.	Biker	Team	Constructor	P1	P2
1	19	(United Kingdom) Scott Ogden	CIP Green Power	KTM	1:56.648	**1:55.249**
2	22	(Spain) David Almansa	Leopard Racing	Honda	1:56.768	1:55.291
3	36	(Spain) Ángel Piqueras	Frinsa – MT Helmets – MSI	KTM	1:57.042	1:55.557
4	83	(Spain) Álvaro Carpe	Red Bull KTM Ajo	KTM	1:56.839	1:55.562
5	64	(Spain) David Muñoz	Liqui Moly Dynavolt Intact GP	KTM	1:56.718	1:55.606
6	66	(Australia) Joel Kelso	LEVELUP-MTA	KTM	1:56.879	1:55.681
7	6	(Japan) Ryusei Yamanaka	Frinsa – MT Helmets – MSI	KTM	1:56.757	1:55.702
8	99	(Spain) José Antonio Rueda	Red Bull KTM Ajo	KTM	**1:55.924**	1:55.706
9	94	(Italy) Guido Pini	Liqui Moly Dynavolt Intact GP	KTM	1:56.732	1:55.803
10	28	(Spain) Máximo Quiles	CFMoto Valresa Aspar Team	KTM	1:57.138	1:55.870
11	31	(Spain) Adrián Fernández	Leopard Racing	Honda	1:57.126	1:56.079
12	71	(Italy) Dennis Foggia	CFMoto Valresa Aspar Team	KTM	1:56.828	1:56.094
13	73	(Argentina) Valentín Perrone	Red Bull KTM Tech3	KTM	1:57.372	1:56.103
14	10	(Italy) Nicola Carraro	Rivacold Snipers Team	Honda	1:57.047	1:56.235
15	54	(Italy) Riccardo Rossi	Rivacold Snipers Team	Honda	1:56.842	1:56.251
16	14	(New Zealand) Cormac Buchanan	Denssi Racing – BOE	KTM	1:57.394	1:56.315
17	58	(Italy) Luca Lunetta	Sic58 Squadra Corse	Honda	1:57.323	1:56.316
18	21	(South Africa) Ruché Moodley	Denssi Racing – BOE	KTM	1:56.913	1:56.376
19	72	(Japan) Taiyo Furusato	Honda Team Asia	Honda	1:57.150	1:56.524
20	8	(United Kingdom) Eddie O'Shea	GRYD - Mlav Racing	Honda	1:57.746	1:56.571
21	89	(Spain) Marcos Uriarte	LEVELUP-MTA	KTM	1:58.255	1:56.730
22	82	(Italy) Stefano Nepa	Sic58 Squadra Corse	Honda	1:57.604	1:56.785
23	12	(Australia) Jacob Roulstone	Red Bull KTM Tech3	KTM	1:56.964	1:56.904
24	5	(Thailand) Tatchakorn Buasri	Honda Team Asia	Honda	1:57.750	1:57.085
25	55	(Switzerland) Noah Dettwiler	CIP Green Power	KTM	1:57.621	1:57.703
26	32	(Spain) Vicente Pérez	GRYD - Mlav Racing	Honda	1:57.658	1:57.910
OFFICIAL MOTO3 FREE PRACTICE TIMES REPORT

==== Practice ====
The top 14 riders (written in bold) qualified for Q2.

Pos.	No.	Biker	Team	Constructor	Practice times
Pos.	No.	Biker	Team	Constructor	P1
1	22	(Spain) **David Almansa**	**Leopard Racing**	**Honda**	**1:55.535**
2	72	(Japan) **Taiyo Furusato**	**Honda Team Asia**	**Honda**	1:55.567
3	6	(Japan) **Ryusei Yamanaka**	**Frinsa – MT Helmets – MSI**	**KTM**	1:55.722
4	66	(Australia) **Joel Kelso**	**LEVELUP-MTA**	**KTM**	1:55.741
5	58	(Italy) **Luca Lunetta**	**Sic58 Squadra Corse**	**Honda**	1:55.801
6	19	(United Kingdom) **Scott Ogden**	**CIP Green Power**	**KTM**	1:55.807
7	83	(Spain) **Álvaro Carpe**	**Red Bull KTM Ajo**	**KTM**	1:55.916
8	73	(Argentina) **Valentín Perrone**	**Red Bull KTM Tech3**	**KTM**	1:55.953
9	36	(Spain) **Ángel Piqueras**	**Frinsa – MT Helmets – MSI**	**KTM**	1:55.967
10	99	(Spain) **José Antonio Rueda**	**Red Bull KTM Ajo**	**KTM**	1:55.978
11	54	(Italy) **Riccardo Rossi**	**Rivacold Snipers Team**	**Honda**	1:56.003
12	10	(Italy) **Nicola Carraro**	**Rivacold Snipers Team**	**Honda**	1:56.039
13	12	(Australia) **Jacob Roulstone**	**Red Bull KTM Tech3**	**KTM**	1:56.201
14	31	(Spain) **Adrián Fernández**	**Leopard Racing**	**Honda**	1:56.239
15	71	(Italy) Dennis Foggia	CFMoto Valresa Aspar Team	KTM	1:56.305
16	64	(Spain) David Muñoz	Liqui Moly Dynavolt Intact GP	KTM	1:56.306
17	21	(South Africa) Ruché Moodley	Denssi Racing – BOE	KTM	1:56.348
18	28	(Spain) Máximo Quiles	CFMoto Valresa Aspar Team	KTM	1:56.411
19	82	(Italy) Stefano Nepa	Sic58 Squadra Corse	Honda	1:56.549
20	5	(Thailand) Tatchakorn Buasri	Honda Team Asia	Honda	1:56.549
21	14	(New Zealand) Cormac Buchanan	Denssi Racing – BOE	KTM	1:56.717
22	8	(United Kingdom) Eddie O'Shea	GRYD - Mlav Racing	Honda	1:56.952
23	32	(Spain) Vicente Pérez	GRYD - Mlav Racing	Honda	1:56.979
24	55	(Switzerland) Noah Dettwiler	CIP Green Power	KTM	1:57.302
25	94	(Italy) Guido Pini	Liqui Moly Dynavolt Intact GP	KTM	1:57.825
26	89	(Spain) Marcos Uriarte	LEVELUP-MTA	KTM	1:58.014
OFFICIAL MOTO3 PRACTICE TIMES REPORT

== Qualifying ==
=== MotoGP ===
Fastest session lap

Pos.	No.	Biker	Team	Constructor	Qualifying times		Final grid	Row
Pos.	No.	Biker	Team	Constructor	Q1	Q2	Final grid	Row
1	93	(Spain) Marc Márquez	Ducati Lenovo Team	Ducati	Qualified in Q2	1:44.169	1	1
2	63	(Italy) Francesco Bagnaia	Ducati Lenovo Team	Ducati	Qualified in Q2	1:44.228	2	1
3	73	(Spain) Álex Márquez	BK8 Gresini Racing MotoGP	Ducati	Qualified in Q2	1:44.252	3	1
4	20	(France) Fabio Quartararo	Monster Energy Yamaha MotoGP Team	Yamaha	Qualified in Q2	1:44.411	4	2
5	12	(Spain) Maverick Viñales	Red Bull KTM Tech3	KTM	Qualified in Q2	1:44.514	5	2
6	21	(Italy) Franco Morbidelli	Pertamina Enduro VR46 Racing Team	Ducati	Qualified in Q2	1:44.568	6	2
7	49	(Italy) Fabio Di Giannantonio	Pertamina Enduro VR46 Racing Team	Ducati	Qualified in Q2	1:44.723	7	3
8	37	(Spain) Pedro Acosta	Red Bull KTM Factory Racing	KTM	Qualified in Q2	1:44.780	8	3
9	42	(Spain) Álex Rins	Monster Energy Yamaha MotoGP Team	Yamaha	Qualified in Q2	1:44.844	9	3
10	72	(Italy) Marco Bezzecchi	Aprilia Racing	Aprilia	Qualified in Q2	1:44.899	10	4
11	25	(Spain) Raúl Fernández	Trackhouse MotoGP Team	Aprilia	1:45.137	1:44.995	11	4
12	54	(Spain) Fermín Aldeguer	BK8 Gresini Racing MotoGP	Ducati	1:44.894	1:45.199	12	4
13	43	(Australia) Jack Miller	Prima Pramac Yamaha MotoGP	Yamaha	1:45.151	N/A	13	5
14	5	(France) Johann Zarco	Castrol Honda LCR	Honda	1:45.185	N/A	14	5
15	33	(South Africa) Brad Binder	Red Bull KTM Factory Racing	KTM	1:45.331	N/A	15	5
16	23	(Italy) Enea Bastianini	Red Bull KTM Tech3	KTM	1:45.370	N/A	16	6
17	88	(Portugal) Miguel Oliveira	Prima Pramac Yamaha MotoGP	Yamaha	1:45.469	N/A	17	6
18	36	(Spain) Joan Mir	Honda HRC Castrol	Honda	1:45.614	N/A	18	6
19	30	(Japan) Takaaki Nakagami	Honda HRC Castrol	Honda	1:45.664	N/A	19	7
20	32	(Italy) Lorenzo Savadori	Aprilia Racing	Aprilia	1:45.718	N/A	20	7
21	79	(Japan) Ai Ogura	Trackhouse MotoGP Team	Aprilia	1:45.802	N/A	21	7
22	35	(Thailand) Somkiat Chantra	IDEMITSU Honda LCR	Honda	1:46.799	N/A	22	8
OFFICIAL MOTOGP QUALIFYING TIMES REPORT

=== Moto2 ===
Fastest session lap

Pos.	No.	Biker	Team	Constructor	Qualifying times		Final grid	Row
Pos.	No.	Biker	Team	Constructor	P1	P2	Final grid	Row
1	10	(Brazil) Diogo Moreira	Italtrans Racing Team	Kalex	Qualified in Q2	1:49.745	1	1
2	44	(Spain) Arón Canet	Fantic Racing Lino Sonego	Kalex	Qualified in Q2	1:49.831	2	1
3	75	(Spain) Albert Arenas	Italjet Gresini Moto2	Kalex	Qualified in Q2	1:49.857	3	1
4	24	(Spain) Marcos Ramírez	OnlyFans American Racing Team	Kalex	Qualified in Q2	1:49.914	4	2
5	18	(Spain) Manuel González	Liqui Moly Dynavolt Intact GP	Kalex	Qualified in Q2	1:49.917	8 (Note: 3 place grid penalty - slowed down Deniz Öncü in training)	3
6	53	(Turkey) Deniz Öncü	Red Bull KTM Ajo	Kalex	1:50.099	1:49.975	4	2
7	13	(Italy) Celestino Vietti	Folladore SpeedRS Team	Boscoscuro	Qualified in Q2	1:50.023	5	2
8	7	(Belgium) Barry Baltus	Fantic Racing Lino Sonego	Kalex	Qualified in Q2	1:50.079	7	3
9	27	(Spain) Daniel Holgado	CFMoto European Privilege Aspar Team	Kalex	Qualified in Q2	1:50.099	9	3
10	14	(Italy) Tony Arbolino	Blu Cru Pramac Yamaha Moto2	Boscoscuro	Qualified in Q2	1:50.173	10	4
11	80	(Colombia) David Alonso	CFMoto European Privilege Aspar Team	Kalex	1:50.287	1:50.195	11	4
12	21	(Spain) Alonso López	Folladore SpeedRS Team	Boscoscuro	Qualified in Q2	1:50.287	12	4
13	28	(Spain) Izan Guevara	Blu Cru Pramac Yamaha Moto2	Boscoscuro	Qualified in Q2	1:50.299	13	5
14	96	(United Kingdom) Jake Dixon	Elf Marc VDS Racing Team	Boscoscuro	Qualified in Q2	1:50.307	14	5
15	71	(Japan) Ayumu Sasaki	RW-Idrofoglia Racing GP	Kalex	1:50.412	1:50.370	15	5
16	12	(Czech Republic) Filip Salač	Elf Marc VDS Racing Team	Boscoscuro	Qualified in Q2	1:50.408	16	6
17	81	(Australia) Senna Agius	Liqui Moly Dynavolt Intact GP	Kalex	Qualified in Q2	1:50.847	17	6
18	16	(United States) Joe Roberts	OnlyFans American Racing Team	Kalex	1:49.847	1:50.866	18	6
19	4	(Spain) Iván Ortolá	QJMotor – Frinsa – MSi	Boscoscuro	1:50.487	N/A	19	7
20	99	(Spain) Adrián Huertas	Italtrans Racing Team	Kalex	1:50.562	N/A	20	7
21	15	(South Africa) Darryn Binder	Italjet Gresini Moto2	Kalex	1:50.756	N/A	21	7
22	95	(Netherlands) Collin Veijer	Red Bull KTM Ajo	Kalex	1:51.017	N/A	22	8
23	92	(Japan) Yuki Kunii	Idemitsu Honda Team Asia	Kalex	1:51.041	N/A	23	8
24	9	(Spain) Jorge Navarro	Klint Forward Factory Team	Forward	1:51.268	N/A	24	8
25	11	(Spain) Alex Escrig	Klint Forward Factory Team	Forward	1:51.876	N/A	25	9
26	61	(Spain) Eric Fernández	QJMotor – Frinsa – MSi	Boscoscuro	1:52.100	N/A	26	9
27	84	(Netherlands) Zonta van den Goorbergh	RW-Idrofoglia Racing GP	Kalex	1:53.198	N/A	27	9
28	41	(Thailand) Nakarin Atiratphuvapat	Idemitsu Honda Team Asia	Kalex	1:53.201	N/A	28	10
OFFICIAL MOTO2 QUALIFYING TIMES REPORT

=== Moto3 ===
Fastest session lap

Pos.	No.	Biker	Team	Constructor	Qualifying times		Final grid	Row
Pos.	No.	Biker	Team	Constructor	P1	P2	Final grid	Row
1	83	(Spain) Álvaro Carpe	Red Bull KTM Ajo	KTM	Qualified in Q2	1:54.733	1	1
2	99	(Spain) José Antonio Rueda	Red Bull KTM Ajo	KTM	Qualified in Q2	1:54.970	2	1
3	19	(United Kingdom) Scott Ogden	CIP Green Power	KTM	Qualified in Q2	1:55.032	3	1
4	36	(Spain) Ángel Piqueras	Frinsa – MT Helmets – MSI	KTM	Qualified in Q2	1:55.407	4	2
5	12	(Australia) Jacob Roulstone	Red Bull KTM Tech3	KTM	Qualified in Q2	1:55.424	5	2
6	73	(Argentina) Valentín Perrone	Red Bull KTM Tech3	KTM	Qualified in Q2	1:55.466	26 (Note: Relegated to back of the grid - driving too slow during qualifying)	9
7	64	(Spain) David Muñoz	Liqui Moly Dynavolt Intact GP	KTM	1:56.142	1:55.591	6	2
8	28	(Spain) Máximo Quiles	CFMoto European Privilege Aspar Team	KTM	1:56.078	1:55.611	7	3
9	66	(Australia) Joel Kelso	LEVELUP-MTA	KTM	Qualified in Q2	1:55.625	8	3
10	22	(Spain) David Almansa	Leopard Racing	Honda	Qualified in Q2	1:55.732	9	3
11	72	(Japan) Taiyo Furusato	Honda Team Asia	Honda	Qualified in Q2	1:55.762	10	4
12	10	(Italy) Nicola Carraro	Rivacold Snipers Team	Honda	Qualified in Q2	1:55.796	11	4
13	31	(Spain) Adrián Fernández	Leopard Racing	Honda	Qualified in Q2	1:55.834	12	4
14	58	(Italy) Luca Lunetta	Sic58 Squadra Corse	Honda	Qualified in Q2	1:55.946	13	5
15	71	(Italy) Dennis Foggia	CFMoto European Privilege Aspar Team	KTM	1:56.508	1:56.135	14	5
16	6	(Japan) Ryusei Yamanaka	Frinsa – MT Helmets – MSI	KTM	Qualified in Q2	1:56.279	15	5
17	32	(Spain) Vicente Pérez	LEVELUP-MTA	KTM	1:56.236	1:57.017	16	6
18	54	(Italy) Riccardo Rossi	Rivacold Snipers Team	Honda	Qualified in Q2	1:57.508	17	6
19	21	(South Africa) Ruché Moodley	Denssi Racing – BOE	KTM	1:56.655	N/A	18	6
20	82	(Italy) Stefano Nepa	Sic58 Squadra Corse	Honda	1:56.896	N/A	19	7
21	94	(Italy) Guido Pini	Liqui Moly Dynavolt Intact GP	KTM	1:56.916	N/A	20	7
22	8	(United Kingdom) Eddie O'Shea	GRYD - Mlav Racing	Honda	1:56.923	N/A	21	7
23	14	(New Zealand) Cormac Buchanan	Denssi Racing – BOE	KTM	1:57.042	N/A	22	8
24	30	(Spain) Marcos Uriarte	GRYD - Mlav Racing	KTM	1:57.364	N/A	23	8
25	5	(Thailand) Tatchakorn Buasri	Honda Team Asia	Honda	1:57.707	N/A	24	8
26	55	(Switzerland) Noah Dettwiler	CIP Green Power	KTM	1:58.095	N/A	25	9
OFFICIAL MOTO3 QUALIFYING TIMES REPORT

== MotoGP Sprint ==
The MotoGP Sprint was held on 21 June 2025.

Pos.	No.	Rider	Team	Manufacturer	Laps	Time/Retired	Grid	Points
1	93	(Spain) Marc Márquez	Ducati Lenovo Team	Ducati	11	19:31.416	1	12
2	73	(Spain) Álex Márquez	BK8 Gresini Racing MotoGP	Ducati	11	+1.441	3	9
3	63	(Italy) Francesco Bagnaia	Ducati Lenovo Team	Ducati	11	+2.561	2	7
4	12	(Spain) Maverick Viñales	Red Bull KTM Tech3	KTM	11	+3.099	5	6
5	49	(Italy) Fabio Di Giannantonio	Pertamina Enduro VR46 Racing Team	Ducati	11	+4.139	7	5
6	72	(Italy) Marco Bezzecchi	Aprilia Racing	Aprilia	11	+6.391	10	4
7	21	(Italy) Franco Morbidelli	Pertamina Enduro VR46 Racing Team	Ducati	11	+7.631	6	3
8	25	(Spain) Raúl Fernández	Trackhouse MotoGP Team	Aprilia	11	+8.926	11	2
9	54	(Spain) Fermín Aldeguer	BK8 Gresini Racing MotoGP	Ducati	11	+10.361	12	1
10	20	(France) Fabio Quartararo	Monster Energy Yamaha MotoGP Team	Yamaha	11	+11.096	4	
11	23	(Italy) Enea Bastianini	Red Bull KTM Tech3	KTM	11	+11.870	16	
12	79	(Japan) Ai Ogura	Trackhouse MotoGP Team	Aprilia	11	+12.930	21	
13	88	(Portugal) Miguel Oliveira	Prima Pramac Yamaha MotoGP	Yamaha	11	+13.916	17	
14	36	(Spain) Joan Mir	Honda HRC Castrol	Honda	11	+15.460	18	
15	30	(Japan) Takaaki Nakagami	Honda HRC Castrol	Honda	11	+17.038	19	
16	43	(Australia) Jack Miller	Prima Pramac Yamaha MotoGP	Yamaha	11	+20.031	13	
17	32	(Italy) Lorenzo Savadori	Aprilia Racing	Aprilia	11	+20.729	20	
18	42	(Spain) Álex Rins	Monster Energy Yamaha MotoGP Team	Yamaha	11	+24.661	9	
19	35	(Thailand) Somkiat Chantra	IDEMITSU Honda LCR	Honda	11	+31.539	22	
Ret	37	(Spain) Pedro Acosta	Red Bull KTM Factory Racing	KTM	0	Accident	8	
Ret	5	(France) Johann Zarco	Castrol Honda LCR	Honda	0	Accident	14	
Ret	33	(South Africa) Brad Binder	Red Bull KTM Factory Racing	KTM	0	Accident	15	
Fastest sprint lap: (Italy) Fabio Di Giannantonio (Ducati) – 1:45.341 (lap 3)
OFFICIAL MOTOGP SPRINT REPORT

== Warm Up ==
=== Warm Up MotoGP ===
Pos.	No.	Biker	Team	Constructor	
Pos.	No.	Biker	Team	Constructor	Time results
1	72	(Italy) Marco Bezzecchi	Aprilia Racing	Aprilia	1:45.857
2	93	(Spain) Marc Márquez	Ducati Lenovo Team	Ducati	1:45.951
3	49	(Italy) Fabio Di Giannantonio	Pertamina Enduro VR46 Racing Team	Ducati	1:46.061
4	73	(Spain) Álex Márquez	BK8 Gresini Racing MotoGP	Ducati	1:46.097
5	21	(Italy) Franco Morbidelli	Pertamina Enduro VR46 Racing Team	Ducati	1:46.235
6	54	(Spain) Fermín Aldeguer	BK8 Gresini Racing MotoGP	Ducati	1:46.253
7	37	(Spain) Pedro Acosta	Red Bull KTM Factory Racing	KTM	1:46.255
8	5	(France) Johann Zarco	CASTROL Honda LCR	Honda	1:46.262
9	20	(France) Fabio Quartararo	Monster Energy Yamaha MotoGP Team	Yamaha	1:46.282
10	23	(Italy) Enea Bastianini	Red Bull KTM Tech3	KTM	1:46.435
11	88	(Portugal) Miguel Oliveira	Prima Pramac Yamaha MotoGP	Yamaha	1:46.450
12	12	(Spain) Maverick Viñales	Red Bull KTM Tech3	KTM	1:46.514
13	33	(South Africa) Brad Binder	Red Bull KTM Factory Racing	KTM	1:46.660
14	43	(Australia) Jack Miller	Prima Pramac Yamaha MotoGP	Yamaha	1:46.676
15	42	(Spain) Álex Rins	Monster Energy Yamaha MotoGP Team	Yamaha	1:46.686
16	25	(Spain) Raúl Fernández	Trackhouse MotoGP Team	Aprilia	1:46.736
17	36	(Spain) Joan Mir	Honda HRC Castrol	Honda	1:46.757
18	30	(Japan) Takaaki Nakagami	Honda HRC Castrol	Honda	1:46.783
19	63	(Italy) Francesco Bagnaia	Ducati Lenovo Team	Ducati	1:46.833
20	79	(Japan) Ai Ogura	Trackhouse MotoGP Team	Aprilia	1:47.443
21	32	(Italy) Lorenzo Savadori	Aprilia Racing	Aprilia	1:47.462
22	35	(Thailand) Somkiat Chantra	Idemitsu Honda LCR	Honda	1:48.104
OFFICIAL MOTOGP WARM UP TIMES REPORT

== Race ==
The main race was held on 22 June 2025.

=== MotoGP ===
Pos.	No.	Rider	Team	Manufacturer	Laps	Time/Retired	Grid	Points
1	93	(Spain) Marc Márquez	Ducati Lenovo Team	Ducati	23	41:09.214	1	25
2	73	(Spain) Álex Márquez	BK8 Gresini Racing MotoGP	Ducati	23	+1.942	3	20
3	49	(Italy) Fabio Di Giannantonio	Pertamina Enduro VR46 Racing Team	Ducati	23	+2.136	7	16
4	63	(Italy) Francesco Bagnaia	Ducati Lenovo Team	Ducati	23	+5.081	2	13
5	72	(Italy) Marco Bezzecchi	Aprilia Racing	Aprilia	23	+9.329	10	11
6	21	(Italy) Franco Morbidelli	Pertamina Enduro VR46 Racing Team	Ducati	23	+16.866	6	10
7	25	(Spain) Raúl Fernández	Trackhouse MotoGP Team	Aprilia	23	+18.526	11	9
8	37	(Spain) Pedro Acosta	Red Bull KTM Factory Racing	KTM	23	+19.349	8	8
9	33	(South Africa) Brad Binder	Red Bull KTM Factory Racing	KTM	23	+19.377	15	7
10	79	(Japan) Ai Ogura	Trackhouse MotoGP Team	Aprilia	23	+21.943	21	6
11	36	(Spain) Joan Mir	Honda HRC Castrol	Honda	23	+22.877	18	5
12	54	(Spain) Fermín Aldeguer	BK8 Gresini Racing MotoGP	Ducati	23	+25.578	12	4
13	88	(Portugal) Miguel Oliveira	Prima Pramac Yamaha MotoGP	Yamaha	23	+26.123	17	3
14	20	(France) Fabio Quartararo	Monster Energy Yamaha MotoGP Team	Yamaha	23	+26.130	4	2
15	42	(Spain) Álex Rins	Monster Energy Yamaha MotoGP Team	Yamaha	23	+28.155	9	1
16	30	(Japan) Takaaki Nakagami	Honda HRC Castrol	Honda	23	+33.110	19	
17	32	(Italy) Lorenzo Savadori	Aprilia Racing	Aprilia	23	+40.900	20	
18	35	(Thailand) Somkiat Chantra	IDEMITSU Honda LCR	Honda	23	+1:10.075	22	
Ret	43	(Australia) Jack Miller	Prima Pramac Yamaha MotoGP	Yamaha	9	Technical issues	13	
Ret	12	(Spain) Maverick Viñales	Red Bull KTM Tech3	KTM	8	Collision damage	5	
Ret	5	(France) Johann Zarco	Castrol Honda LCR	Honda	3	Accident	14	
Ret	23	(Italy) Enea Bastianini	Red Bull KTM Tech3	KTM	0	Accident	16	
Fastest lap: (Italy) Franco Morbidelli (Ducati) – 1:46.474 (lap 2)
OFFICIAL MOTOGP RACE REPORT

=== Moto2 ===
Pos.	No.	Rider	Team	Manufacturer	Laps	Time/Retired	Grid	Points
1	18	(Spain) Manuel González	Liqui Moly Dynavolt Intact GP	Kalex	19	35:34.695	8	25
2	75	(Spain) Albert Arenas	Italjet Gresini Moto2	Kalex	19	+1.409	3	20
3	44	(Spain) Arón Canet	Fantic Racing Lino Sonego	Kalex	19	+3.648	2	16
4	10	(Brazil) Diogo Moreira	Italtrans Racing Team	Kalex	19	+3.745	1	13
5	13	(Italy) Celestino Vietti	Beta Tools SpeedRS Team	Boscoscuro	19	+3.813	6	11
6	53	(Turkey) Deniz Öncü	Red Bull KTM Ajo	Kalex	19	+5.091	5	10
7	28	(Spain) Izan Guevara	Blu Cru Pramac Yamaha Moto2	Boscoscuro	19	+5.683	13	9
8	80	(Colombia) David Alonso	CFMoto European Privilege Aspar Team	Kalex	19	+5.924	11	8
9	16	(United States) Joe Roberts	OnlyFans American Racing Team	Kalex	19	+9.167	18	7
10	24	(Spain) Marcos Ramírez	OnlyFans American Racing Team	Kalex	19	+9.247	4	6
11	7	(Belgium) Barry Baltus	Fantic Racing Lino Sonego	Kalex	19	+9.952	7	5
12	12	(Czech Republic) Filip Salač	Elf Marc VDS Racing Team	Boscoscuro	19	+10.949	16	4
13	81	(Australia) Senna Agius	Liqui Moly Dynavolt Intact GP	Kalex	19	+11.099	17	3
14	21	(Spain) Alonso López	Beta Tools SpeedRS Team	Boscoscuro	19	+11.863	12	2
15	27	(Spain) Daniel Holgado	CFMoto European Privilege Aspar Team	Kalex	19	+11.967	9	1
16	4	(Spain) Iván Ortolá	QJMotor – Frinsa – MSi	Boscoscuro	19	+14.693	19	
17	96	(United Kingdom) Jake Dixon	Elf Marc VDS Racing Team	Boscoscuro	19	+14.739	14	
18	14	(Italy) Tony Arbolino	Blu Cru Pramac Yamaha Moto2	Boscoscuro	19	+15.321	10	
19	71	(Japan) Ayumu Sasaki	RW-Idrofoglia Racing GP	Kalex	19	+15.445	15	
20	95	(Netherlands) Collin Veijer	Red Bull KTM Ajo	Kalex	19	+16.830	22	
21	15	(South Africa) Darryn Binder	Italjet Gresini Moto2	Kalex	19	+17.312	21	
22	99	(Spain) Adrián Huertas	Italtrans Racing Team	Kalex	19	+18.289	20	
23	92	(Japan) Yuki Kunii	Idemitsu Honda Team Asia	Kalex	19	+27.751	23	
24	11	(Spain) Alex Escrig	Klint Forward Factory Team	Forward	19	+36.242	25	
25	41	(Thailand) Nakarin Atiratphuvapat	Idemitsu Honda Team Asia	Kalex	19	+38.805	28	
26	61	(Spain) Eric Fernández	QJMotor – Frinsa – MSi	Boscoscuro	19	+44.883	26	
Ret	84	(Netherlands) Zonta van den Goorbergh	RW-Idrofoglia Racing GP	Kalex	14	Injury	27	
Ret	9	(Spain) Jorge Navarro	Klint Forward Factory Team	Forward	8	Crashed out	24	
Fastest lap: (Spain) Manuel González (Kalex) - 1:50.816 (lap 2)
OFFICIAL MOTO2 RACE REPORT

=== Moto3 ===
Pos.	No.	Rider	Team	Manufacturer	Laps	Time/Retired	Grid	Points
1	28	(Spain) Máximo Quiles	CFMoto Valresa Aspar Team	KTM	17	33:17.697	7	25
2	83	(Spain) Álvaro Carpe	Red Bull KTM Ajo	KTM	17	+0.006	1	20
3	71	(Italy) Dennis Foggia	CFMoto Valresa Aspar Team	KTM	17	+0.066	14	16
4	99	(Spain) José Antonio Rueda	Red Bull KTM Ajo	KTM	17	+0.102	2	13
5	64	(Spain) David Muñoz	Liqui Moly Dynavolt Intact GP	KTM	17	+0.212	6	11
6	72	(Japan) Taiyo Furusato	Honda Team Asia	Honda	17	+0.312	10	10
7	36	(Spain) Ángel Piqueras	Frinsa – MT Helmets – MSI	KTM	17	+0.426	4	9
8	73	(Argentina) Valentín Perrone	Red Bull KTM Tech3	KTM	17	+0.448	26	8
9	66	(Australia) Joel Kelso	LEVELUP-MTA	KTM	17	+0.550	8	7
10	6	(Japan) Ryusei Yamanaka	Frinsa – MT Helmets – MSI	KTM	17	+1.242	15	6
11	10	(Italy) Nicola Carraro	Rivacold Snipers Team	Honda	17	+2.986	11	5
12	19	(United Kingdom) Scott Ogden	CIP Green Power	KTM	17	+8.048 (Note: 3 second time penalty - insufficient time to complete long lap penalty)	3	4
13	12	(Australia) Jacob Roulstone	Red Bull KTM Tech3	KTM	17	+10.469	5	3
14	82	(Italy) Stefano Nepa	Sic58 Squadra Corse	Honda	17	+10.504	19	2
15	14	(New Zealand) Cormac Buchanan	Denssi Racing – BOE	KTM	17	+10.811	22	1
16	89	(Spain) Marcos Uriarte	GRYD - Mlav Racing	KTM	17	+10.818	23	
17	5	(Thailand) Tatchakorn Buasri	Honda Team Asia	Honda	17	+11.350	24	
18	8	(United Kingdom) Eddie O'Shea	GRYD - Mlav Racing	Honda	17	+16.127	21	
19	55	(Switzerland) Noah Dettwiler	CIP Green Power	KTM	17	+16.482	25	
Ret	94	(Italy) Guido Pini	Liqui Moly Dynavolt Intact GP	KTM	10	Accident damage	20	
Ret	31	(Spain) Adrián Fernández	Leopard Racing	Honda	8	Accident	12	
Ret	58	(Italy) Luca Lunetta	Sic58 Squadra Corse	Honda	8	Accident	13	
Ret	22	(Spain) David Almansa	Leopard Racing	Honda	2	Accident	9	
Ret	54	(Italy) Riccardo Rossi	Rivacold Snipers Team	Honda	1	Accident	17	
Ret	21	(South Africa) Ruché Moodley	Denssi Racing – BOE	KTM	1	Accident	18	
Ret	32	(Spain) Vicente Pérez	LEVELUP-MTA	KTM	1	Accident	16	
Fastest lap: (Spain) David Muñoz (KTM) - 1:55.805 (lap 12)
OFFICIAL MOTO3 RACE REPORT

== Championship standings after the race ==
Below are the standings for the top five riders, constructors, and teams after the round.

=== MotoGP ===
Riders' Championship standings

Pos.	Rider	Points
1	(Spain) Marc Márquez	270
2	(Spain) Álex Márquez	230
3	(Italy) Francesco Bagnaia	160
4	(Italy) Franco Morbidelli	128
5	(Italy) Fabio Di Giannantonio	120

Constructors' Championship standings

Pos.	Constructor	Points
1	(Italy) Ducati	319
2	(Japan) Honda	124
3	(Austria) KTM	120
4	(Italy) Aprilia	118
5	(Japan) Yamaha	92

Teams' Championship standings

	Pos.	Team	Points
	1	(Italy) Ducati Lenovo Team	430
	2	(Italy) BK8 Gresini Racing MotoGP	308
	3	(Italy) Pertamina Enduro VR46 Racing Team	248
	4	(Austria) Red Bull KTM Factory Racing	126
2	5	(Italy) Aprilia Racing	102

=== Moto2 ===
Riders' Championship standings

Pos.	Rider	Points
1	(Spain) Manuel González	143
2	(Spain) Arón Canet	134
3	(Brazil) Diogo Moreira	103
4	(Belgium) Barry Baltus	94
5	(United Kingdom) Jake Dixon	85

Constructors' Championship standings

Pos.	Constructor	Points
1	(Germany) Kalex	208
2	(Italy) Boscoscuro	121
3	(Switzerland) Forward	11

Teams' Championship standings

Pos.	Team	Points
1	(Italy) Fantic Racing Lino Sonego	228
2	(Germany) Liqui Moly Dynavolt Intact GP	223
3	(Belgium) Elf Marc VDS Racing Team	137
4	(Italy) Beta Tools SpeedRS Team	113
5	(Italy) Italtrans Racing Team	108

=== Moto3 ===
Riders' Championship standings

	Pos.	Rider	Points
	1	(Spain) José Antonio Rueda	162
	2	(Spain) Ángel Piqueras	106
1	3	(Spain) Álvaro Carpe	105
1	4	(Australia) Joel Kelso	93
3	5	(Spain) Máximo Quiles	85

Constructors' Championship standings

Pos.	Constructor	Points
1	(Austria) KTM	225
2	(Japan) Honda	126

Teams' Championship standings

	Pos.	Team	Points
	1	(Finland) Red Bull KTM Ajo	267
	2	(Spain) Frinsa – MT Helmets – MSi	161
	3	(Italy) LevelUp – MTA	140
1	4	(Spain) CFMoto Valresa Aspar Team	134
1	5	(Luxembourg) Leopard Racing	117

== Notes ==
Previous race: 2025 Aragon Grand Prix	FIM Grand Prix World Championship; 2025 season	Next race: 2025 Dutch TT
Previous race: 2024 Italian Grand Prix	Italian motorcycle Grand Prix	Next race: 2026 Italian Grand Prix
