= 2022 Japanese motorcycle Grand Prix =

Sixteenth round of the 2022 Grand Prix motorcycle racing season

(Japan) 2022 Japanese Grand Prix
Race details
- Race 16 of 20 races in the 2022 Grand Prix motorcycle racing season
- Date: 25 September 2022
- Official name: Motul Grand Prix of Japan
- Location: Mobility Resort Motegi; Motegi, Japan
- Course: Permanent racing facility; 4.801 km (2.983 mi)

MotoGP
Pole position
Rider	(Spain) Marc Márquez	Honda
Time	1:55.214	
Fastest lap
Rider	(Australia) Jack Miller	Ducati
Time	1:45.198 on lap 9	
Podium
First	(Australia) Jack Miller	Ducati
Second	(South Africa) Brad Binder	KTM
Third	(Spain) Jorge Martín	Ducati

Moto2
Pole position
Rider	(Spain) Arón Canet	Kalex
Time	2:04.939	
Fastest lap
Rider	(Spain) Augusto Fernández	Kalex
Time	1:50.801 on lap 18	
Podium
First	(Japan) Ai Ogura	Kalex
Second	(Spain) Augusto Fernández	Kalex
Third	(Spain) Alonso López	Boscoscuro

Moto3
Pole position
Rider	(Japan) Tatsuki Suzuki	Honda
Time	2:11.246	
Fastest lap
Rider	(Spain) Jaume Masià	KTM
Time	1:57.360 on lap 7	
Podium
First	(Spain) Izan Guevara	Gas Gas
Second	(Italy) Dennis Foggia	Honda
Third	(Japan) Ayumu Sasaki	Husqvarna

The 2022 Japanese motorcycle Grand Prix (officially known as the Motul Grand Prix of Japan) was the sixteenth round of the 2022 Grand Prix motorcycle racing season. It was held at the Mobility Resort Motegi in Motegi on 25 September 2022.

The Grand Prix returned to Japan after absences in 2020 and 2021 in response to the COVID-19 pandemic.

== Background ==
=== Time schedule change ===
Unlike the other race weekends, on Friday there was only one free practice session for each class, with the consequence that the second was scheduled on Saturday morning. The combined classification for access in Q1 and Q2 was determined by the times of only FP1 and FP2 (which will last seventy-five minutes each), as already happened in this championship in the Indonesian Grand Prix. Consequently, the free practice session before MotoGP qualifying became FP3.

=== Riders' entries ===
In the MotoGP class, Takuya Tsuda, initially announced as a wild card with the Suzuki Ecstar Team, replaced the owner Joan Mir still suffering from an ankle injury; Tetsuta Nagashima ran wild for Team HRC. In the Moto2 class, in addition to the replacement of Gabriel Rodrigo in the Pertamina Mandalika SAG Team with the Japanese Taiga Hada, there was the return of Sam Lowes to the Elf Marc VDS Racing Team. In the Moto3 class, in addition to Nicola Carraro replacing Matteo Bertelle in the QJmotor Avintia Racing Team, there was also the replacement of the injured Alberto Surra in the Rivacold Snipers Team with the Japanese Kanta Hamada.

=== MotoGP Championship standings before the race ===
The crash in the previous Grand Prix by Fabio Quartararo, sees the leader of the riders' stand at 211 points and the rapprochement of Francesco Bagnaia and Aleix Espargaró (finished second and third), now 10 and 17 points away respectively. Enea Bastianini, winner of Aragon, is now 48 points behind the top of the standings. Jack Miller is fifth at -77 points from the top. In the constructors' classification, Ducati is arithmetically champion with 346 points; Aprilia overtakes Yamaha in second position (217 the first, 213 the second). Followed by KTM (161 points), Suzuki (134 points) and Honda (100 points). In the team standings, Ducati Lenovo Team is first with 335 points, with a lead of 37 points over Aprilia Racing, 98 over Monster Energy Yamaha MotoGP and Prima Pramac Racing and 112 over Red Bull KTM Factory Racing.

=== Moto2 Championship standings before the race ===
Augusto Fernández increases his lead in the riders' standing after the Aragon Grand Prix: he is now on 214 points, 7 more than Ai Ogura. Arón Canet is third with 177 points, followed by Celestino Vietti with 162 points and Tony Arbolino with 128 points. The constructors' classification states: Kalex (already arithmetically champion) 370 points, Boscoscuro 121 points, MV Agusta 5 points. In the team standings, Red Bull KTM Ajo is first with 337 points, followed 21 points behind by Idemitsu Honda Team Asia. Flexbox HP40 is third with 260 points, ahead of Elf Marc VDS Racing Team and Shimoko GasGas Aspar Team, who have 179 and 173 points respectively.

=== Moto3 Championship standings before the race ===
Izan Guevara's victory in Aragon, combined with the difficulties of Sergio García and Dennis Foggia (finished thirteenth and fourteenth) allows him to increase his advantage in the drivers' classification: the first is at 229 points, with the second and third following him respectively. with 196 and 171 points. Ayumu Sasaki is fourth with 158 points, 3 more than Jaume Masià. In the constructors' classification, Gas Gas (287 points) brings the distances ahead of Honda and KTM to 32 and 41 points. Husqvarna and CFMoto are fourth and fifth with 194 and 110 points respectively. In the team standings, AutoSolar GasGas Aspar Team leads with 425 points, with a large advantage over their rivals: Leopard Racing (299 points), Red Bull KTM Ajo (238 points), Sterilgarda Husqvarna Max (211 points), Red Bull KTM Tech3 (193 points).

== Free practice ==
=== MotoGP ===
In the first session, carried out in the dry, the fastest was Jack Miller, ahead of his teammate Francesco Bagnaia and Fabio Quartararo. In the second session, held in the wet, Marc Márquez set the best time, ahead of his compatriot Jorge Martín and Miller.

==== Combinated Free Practice 1 and 2 ====
The top ten riders (written in bold) qualified in Q2.

Fastest session lap

Pos.	No.	Biker	Constructor	Free practice times	
Pos.	No.	Biker	Constructor	FP1	FP2
1	43	**(Australia) Jack Miller**	**Ducati**	1:44.509	1:55.387
2	63	**(Italy) Francesco Bagnaia**	**Ducati**	1:44.537	1:56.752
3	20	**(France) Fabio Quartararo**	**Yamaha**	1:44.558	1:56.561
4	41	**(Spain) Aleix Espargaró**	**Aprilia**	1:44.577	1:56.577
5	10	**(Italy) Luca Marini**	**Ducati**	1:44.645	1:56.548
6	93	**(Spain) Marc Márquez**	**Honda**	1:44.656	1:55.232
7	44	**(Spain) Pol Espargaró**	**Honda**	1:44.678	1:57.003
8	33	**(South Africa) Brad Binder**	**KTM**	1:44.735	1:57.827
9	88	**(Portugal) Miguel Oliveira**	**KTM**	1:44.743	1:55.428
10	12	**(Spain) Maverick Viñales**	**Aprilia**	1:44.797	1:56.925
11	5	(France) Johann Zarco	Ducati	1:44.798	1:55.630
12	30	(Japan) Takaaki Nakagami	Honda	1:44.886	1:56.874
13	42	(Spain) Álex Rins	Suzuki	1:44.913	1:57.671
14	23	(Italy) Enea Bastianini	Ducati	1:44.978	1:56.197
15	89	(Spain) Jorge Martín	Ducati	1:45.009	1:55.376
16	21	(Italy) Franco Morbidelli	Yamaha	1:45.065	1:56.168
17	35	(United Kingdom) Cal Crutchlow	Yamaha	1:45.187	1:56.743
18	40	(South Africa) Darryn Binder	Yamaha	1:45.366	1:57.606
19	72	(Italy) Marco Bezzecchi	Ducati	1:45.426	1:56.655
20	73	(Spain) Álex Márquez	Honda	1:45.600	1:56.349
21	25	(Spain) Raúl Fernández	KTM	1:45.739	1:57.292
22	45	(Japan) Tetsuta Nagashima	Honda	1:45.845	1:57.656
23	87	(Australia) Remy Gardner	KTM	1:45.991	1:56.851
24	49	(Italy) Fabio Di Giannantonio	Ducati	1:46.365	1:56.588
25	85	(Japan) Takuya Tsuda	Suzuki	1:46.728	1:58.631
OFFICIAL MOTOGP COMBINED FREE PRACTICE TIMES REPORT

== Qualifying ==
=== MotoGP ===
Fastest session lap

Pos.	No.	Biker	Constructor	Qualifying times		Final grid	Row
Pos.	No.	Biker	Constructor	Q1	Q2	Final grid	Row
1	93	(Spain) Marc Márquez	Honda	Qualified in Q2	1:55.214	1	1
2	5	(France) Johann Zarco	Ducati	1:55.300	1:55.422	2	1
3	33	(South Africa) Brad Binder	KTM	Qualified in Q2	1:55.537	3	1
4	12	(Spain) Maverick Viñales	Aprilia	Qualified in Q2	1:55.620	4	2
5	89	(Spain) Jorge Martín	Ducati	1:55.795	1:55.686	5	2
6	41	(Spain) Aleix Espargaró	Aprilia	Qualified in Q2	1:55.771	6	2
7	43	(Australia) Jack Miller	Ducati	Qualified in Q2	1:55.784	7	3
8	88	(Portugal) Miguel Oliveira	KTM	Qualified in Q2	1:55.895	8	3
9	20	(France) Fabio Quartararo	Yamaha	Qualified in Q2	1:56.326	9	3
10	10	(Italy) Luca Marini	Ducati	Qualified in Q2	1:56.354	10	4
11	44	(Spain) Pol Espargaró	Honda	Qualified in Q2	1:57.354	11	4
12	63	(Italy) Francesco Bagnaia	Ducati	Qualified in Q2	1:57.373	12	4
13	72	(Italy) Marco Bezzecchi	Ducati	1:55.934	N/A	13	5
14	21	(Italy) Franco Morbidelli	Yamaha	1:56.006	N/A	14	5
15	23	(Italy) Enea Bastianini	Ducati	1:56.130	N/A	15	5
16	49	(Italy) Fabio Di Giannantonio	Ducati	1:56.432	N/A	16	6
17	73	(Spain) Álex Márquez	Honda	1:56.578	N/A	17	6
18	42	(Spain) Álex Rins	Suzuki	1:56.656	N/A	18	6
19	45	(Japan) Tetsuta Nagashima	Honda	1:57.229	N/A	19	7
20	87	(Australia) Remy Gardner	KTM	1:57.288	N/A	20	7
21	85	(Japan) Takuya Tsuda	Suzuki	1:57.787	N/A	21	7
22	25	(Spain) Raúl Fernández	KTM	1:57.827	N/A	22	8
23	35	(United Kingdom) Cal Crutchlow	Yamaha	1:58.115	N/A	23	8
24	40	(South Africa) Darryn Binder	Yamaha	1:58.292	N/A	24	8
25	30	(Japan) Takaaki Nakagami	Honda	1:58.717	N/A	25	9
OFFICIAL MOTOGP QUALIFYING RESULTS

=== Moto2 ===
Fastest session lap

Pos.	No.	Biker	Constructor	Qualifying times		Final grid	Row
Pos.	No.	Biker	Constructor	Q1	Q2	Final grid	Row
1	40	(Spain) Arón Canet	Kalex	2:05.543	2:04.939	1	1
2	96	(United Kingdom) Jake Dixon	Kalex	Qualified in Q2	2:05.669	2	1
3	14	(Italy) Tony Arbolino	Kalex	Qualified in Q2	2:05.891	3	1
4	35	(Thailand) Somkiat Chantra	Kalex	Qualified in Q2	2:06.111	4	2
5	12	(Czech Republic) Filip Salač	Kalex	Qualified in Q2	2:06.123	5	2
6	54	(Spain) Fermín Aldeguer	Boscoscuro	Qualified in Q2	2:06.311	6	2
7	9	(Spain) Jorge Navarro	Kalex	Qualified in Q2	2:06.468	7	3
8	6	(United States) Cameron Beaubier	Kalex	2:06.513	2:06.680	8	3
9	81	(Thailand) Keminth Kubo	Kalex	2:06.501	2:06.785	9	3
10	7	(Belgium) Barry Baltus	Kalex	2:05.734	2:07.119	10	4
11	37	(Spain) Augusto Fernández	Kalex	Qualified in Q2	2:07.348	11	4
12	21	(Spain) Alonso López	Boscoscuro	Qualified in Q2	2:07.443	12	4
13	79	(Japan) Ai Ogura	Kalex	Qualified in Q2	2:07.697	13	5
14	16	(United States) Joe Roberts	Kalex	Qualified in Q2	2:07.764	14	5
15	64	(Netherlands) Bo Bendsneyder	Kalex	Qualified in Q2	2:07.831	15	5
16	84	(Netherlands) Zonta van den Goorbergh	Kalex	Qualified in Q2	2:08.284	16	6
17	75	(Spain) Albert Arenas	Kalex	Qualified in Q2	2:08.634	17	6
18	51	(Spain) Pedro Acosta	Kalex	Qualified in Q2	2:09.394	18	6
19	19	(Italy) Lorenzo Dalla Porta	Kalex	2:06.790	N/A	19	7
20	29	(Japan) Taiga Hada	Kalex	2:07.002	N/A	20	7
21	23	(Germany) Marcel Schrötter	Kalex	2:07.087	N/A	21	7
22	13	(Italy) Celestino Vietti	Kalex	2:07.114	N/A	22	8
23	61	(Italy) Alessandro Zaccone	Kalex	2:07.296	N/A	23	8
24	22	(United Kingdom) Sam Lowes	Kalex	2:07.423	N/A	24	8
25	4	(United States) Sean Dylan Kelly	Kalex	2:08.067	N/A	25	9
26	28	(Italy) Niccolò Antonelli	Kalex	2:08.684	N/A	26	9
27	42	(Spain) Marcos Ramírez	MV Agusta	2:09.131	N/A	27	9
28	24	(Italy) Simone Corsi	MV Agusta	2:09.950	N/A	28	10
29	52	(Spain) Jeremy Alcoba	Kalex	2:10.530	N/A	29	10
30	18	(Spain) Manuel González	Kalex	N/A	N/A	30	10
OFFICIAL MOTO2 QUALIFYING RESULTS

=== Moto3 ===
Fastest session lap

Pos.	No.	Biker	Constructor	Qualifying times		Final grid	Row
Pos.	No.	Biker	Constructor	Q1	Q2	Final grid	Row
1	24	(Japan) Tatsuki Suzuki	Honda	Qualified in Q2	2:11.246	1	1
2	19	(United Kingdom) Scott Ogden	Honda	2:11.779	2:11.568	2	1
3	11	(Spain) Sergio García	Gas Gas	2.12.122	2:11.788	3	1
4	71	(Japan) Ayumu Sasaki	Husqvarna	Qualified in Q2	2:11.942	4	2
5	7	(Italy) Dennis Foggia	Honda	Qualified in Q2	2:12.015	5	2
6	16	(Italy) Andrea Migno	Honda	Qualified in Q2	2:12.038	6	2
7	54	(Italy) Riccardo Rossi	Honda	Qualified in Q2	2:12.120	7	3
8	53	(Turkey) Deniz Öncü	KTM	Qualified in Q2	2:12.124	8	3
9	28	(Spain) Izan Guevara	Gas Gas	Qualified in Q2	2:12.155	9	3
10	5	(Spain) Jaume Masià	KTM	Qualified in Q2	2:12.229	10	4
11	99	(Spain) Carlos Tatay	CFMoto	2:12.122	2:12.505	11	4
12	17	(United Kingdom) John McPhee	Husqvarna	Qualified in Q2	2:12.993	12	4
13	20	(France) Lorenzo Fellon	Honda	2:12.394	2:13.109	13	5
14	31	(Spain) Adrián Fernández	KTM	Qualified in Q2	2:13.686	14	5
15	10	(Brazil) Diogo Moreira	KTM	Qualified in Q2	2:14.078	15	5
16	44	(Spain) David Muñoz	KTM	Qualified in Q2	2:14.856	16	6
17	6	(Japan) Ryusei Yamanaka	KTM	Qualified in Q2	2:15.706	17	6
18	27	(Japan) Kaito Toba	KTM	Qualified in Q2	2:15.837	18	6
19	72	(Japan) Taiyo Furusato	Honda	2:12.749	N/A	19	7
20	48	(Spain) Iván Ortolá	KTM	2:13.081	N/A	20	7
21	96	(Spain) Daniel Holgado	KTM	2:13.237	N/A	21	7
22	66	(Australia) Joel Kelso	KTM	2:13.393	N/A	22	8
23	43	(Spain) Xavier Artigas	CFMoto	2:13.447	N/A	23	8
24	70	(United Kingdom) Joshua Whatley	Honda	2:13.756	N/A	24	8
25	82	(Italy) Stefano Nepa	KTM	2:13.775	N/A	25	9
26	23	(Italy) Elia Bartolini	KTM	2:13.985	N/A	26	9
27	34	(Japan) Kanta Hamada	Honda	2:14.027	N/A	27	9
28	64	(Indonesia) Mario Aji	Honda	2:14.763	N/A	28	10
29	9	(Italy) Nicola Carraro	KTM	2:15.402	N/A	29	10
30	22	(Spain) Ana Carrasco	KTM	2:20.016	N/A	30	10
OFFICIAL MOTO3 QUALIFYING RESULTS

== Race ==
=== MotoGP ===
Pos.	No.	Biker	Team	Constructor	Laps	Time/Retired	Grid	Points
1	43	(Australia) Jack Miller	Ducati Lenovo Team	Ducati	24	42:29.174	7	25
2	33	(South Africa) Brad Binder	Red Bull KTM Factory Racing	KTM	24	+3.409	3	20
3	89	(Spain) Jorge Martín	Prima Pramac Racing	Ducati	24	+4.136	5	16
4	93	(Spain) Marc Márquez	Repsol Honda Team	Honda	24	+7.784	1	13
5	88	(Portugal) Miguel Oliveira	Red Bull KTM Factory Racing	KTM	24	+8.185	8	11
6	10	(Italy) Luca Marini	Mooney VR46 Racing Team	Ducati	24	+8.348	10	10
7	12	(Spain) Maverick Viñales	Aprilia Racing	Aprilia	24	+9.879	4	9
8	20	(France) Fabio Quartararo	Monster Energy Yamaha MotoGP	Yamaha	24	+10.193	9	8
9	23	(Italy) Enea Bastianini	Gresini Racing MotoGP	Ducati	24	+10.318	15	7
10	72	(Italy) Marco Bezzecchi	Mooney VR46 Racing Team	Ducati	24	+16.419	13	6
11	5	(France) Johann Zarco	Prima Pramac Racing	Ducati	24	+16.586	2	5
12	44	(Spain) Pol Espargaró	Repsol Honda Team	Honda	24	+17.456	11	4
13	73	(Spain) Álex Márquez	LCR Honda Castrol	Honda	24	+18.219	17	3
14	21	(Italy) Franco Morbidelli	Monster Energy Yamaha MotoGP	Yamaha	24	+19.012	14	2
15	35	(United Kingdom) Cal Crutchlow	WithU Yamaha RNF MotoGP Team	Yamaha	24	+19.201	23	1
16	41	(Spain) Aleix Espargaró	Aprilia Racing	Aprilia	24	+25.473	PL^{1}	
17	49	(Italy) Fabio Di Giannantonio	Gresini Racing MotoGP	Ducati	24	+27.006	16	
18	25	(Spain) Raúl Fernández	Tech3 KTM Factory Racing	KTM	24	+29.374	22	
19	87	(Australia) Remy Gardner	Tech3 KTM Factory Racing	KTM	24	+29.469	20	
20	30	(Japan) Takaaki Nakagami	LCR Honda Idemitsu	Honda	24	+43.294	25	
Ret	63	(Italy) Francesco Bagnaia	Ducati Lenovo Team	Ducati	23	Accident	12	
Ret	42	(Spain) Álex Rins	Team Suzuki Ecstar	Suzuki	14	Wheel Rim	18	
Ret	40	(South Africa) Darryn Binder	WithU Yamaha RNF MotoGP Team	Yamaha	14	Accident	24	
Ret	85	(Japan) Takuya Tsuda	Team Suzuki Ecstar	Suzuki	11	Engine Fire	21	
Ret	45	(Japan) Tetsuta Nagashima	HRC Team	Honda	9	Accident	19	
Fastest lap: (Australia) Jack Miller (Ducati) – 1:45.198 (lap 9)
OFFICIAL MOTOGP RACE REPORT

Notes:

- ^1 – Aleix Espargaró was due to start from sixth place, but was forced to start from the pit lane after suffering mechanical problems and therefore using his spare bike, which left his grid slot vacant.

=== Moto2 ===
Pos.	No.	Biker	Constructor	Laps	Time/Retired	Grid	Points
1	79	(Japan) Ai Ogura	Kalex	22	40:56.269	13	25
2	37	(Spain) Augusto Fernández	Kalex	22	+1.192	11	20
3	21	(Spain) Alonso López	Boscoscuro	22	+7.168	12	16
4	96	(United Kingdom) Jake Dixon	Kalex	22	+7.597	2	13
5	35	(Thailand) Somkiat Chantra	Kalex	22	+12.255	4	11
6	14	(Italy) Tony Arbolino	Kalex	22	+14.189	3	10
7	51	(Spain) Pedro Acosta	Kalex	22	+14.520	18	9
8	75	(Spain) Albert Arenas	Kalex	22	+18.410	17	8
9	64	(Netherlands) Bo Bendsneyder	Kalex	22	+20.398	15	7
10	12	(Czech Republic) Filip Salač	Kalex	22	+23.140	5	6
11	6	(United States) Cameron Beaubier	Kalex	22	+23.604	8	5
12	16	(United States) Joe Roberts	Kalex	22	+23.733	14	4
13	23	(Germany) Marcel Schrötter	Kalex	22	+24.171	21	3
14	7	(Belgium) Barry Baltus	Kalex	22	+33.795	10	2
15	19	(Italy) Lorenzo Dalla Porta	Kalex	22	+35.548	19	1
16	84	(Netherlands) Zonta van den Goorbergh	Kalex	22	+40.006	16	
17	29	(Japan) Taiga Hada	Kalex	22	+42.496	20	
18	81	(Thailand) Keminth Kubo	Kalex	22	+46.492	9	
19	4	(United States) Sean Dylan Kelly	Kalex	22	+49.126	24	
20	42	(Spain) Marcos Ramírez	MV Agusta	22	+1:09.754	26	
Ret	52	(Spain) Jeremy Alcoba	Kalex	21	Accident	28	
Ret	9	(Spain) Jorge Navarro	Kalex	20	Accident	7	
Ret	40	(Spain) Arón Canet	Kalex	15	Accident	1	
Ret	28	(Italy) Niccolò Antonelli	Kalex	15	Accident	25	
Ret	13	(Italy) Celestino Vietti	Kalex	7	Accident	22	
Ret	24	(Italy) Simone Corsi	MV Agusta	5	Mechanical	27	
Ret	61	(Italy) Alessandro Zaccone	Kalex	5	Accident	23	
Ret	54	(Spain) Fermín Aldeguer	Boscoscuro	2	Accident	6	
DNS	22	(United Kingdom) Sam Lowes	Kalex		Did not start		
DNS	18	(Spain) Manuel González	Kalex		Did not start		
Fastest lap: (Spain) Augusto Fernández (Kalex) – 1:50.801 (lap 18)
OFFICIAL MOTO2 RACE REPORT

- Manuel González withdrew from the race after suffering from a fractured shoulder sustained during Qualifying.

=== Moto3 ===
Pos.	No.	Biker	Constructor	Laps	Time/Retired	Grid	Points
1	28	(Spain) Izan Guevara	Gas Gas	20	39:26.526	9	25
2	7	(Italy) Dennis Foggia	Honda	20	+0.593	5	20
3	71	(Japan) Ayumu Sasaki	Husqvarna	20	+1.741	4	16
4	11	(Spain) Sergio García	Gas Gas	20	+9.338	3	13
5	44	(Spain) David Muñoz	KTM	20	+9.414	16	11
6	10	(Brazil) Diogo Moreira	KTM	20	+9.743	15	10
7	17	(United Kingdom) John McPhee	Husqvarna	20	+9.815	12	9
8	6	(Japan) Ryusei Yamanaka	KTM	20	+15.490	17	8
9	16	(Italy) Andrea Migno	Honda	20	+15.573	6	7
10	54	(Italy) Riccardo Rossi	Honda	20	+15.687	7	6
11	43	(Spain) Xavier Artigas	CFMoto	20	+22.023	23	5
12	82	(Italy) Stefano Nepa	KTM	20	+22.656	25	4
13	48	(Spain) Iván Ortolá	KTM	20	+22.914	20	3
14	72	(Japan) Taiyo Furusato	Honda	20	+24.419	19	2
15	53	(Turkey) Deniz Öncü	KTM	20	+30.368	8	1
16	23	(Italy) Elia Bartolini	KTM	20	+45.070	26	
17	64	(Indonesia) Mario Aji	Honda	20	+45.199	28	
18	31	(Spain) Adrián Fernández	KTM	20	+48.531	14	
19	22	(Spain) Ana Carrasco	KTM	20	+53.259	30	
20	19	(United Kingdom) Scott Ogden	Honda	20	+1:06.056	2	
21	27	(Japan) Kaito Toba	KTM	17	+3 laps	18	
Ret	5	(Spain) Jaume Masià	KTM	16	Accident	10	
Ret	20	(France) Lorenzo Fellon	Honda	9	Accident	13	
Ret	9	(Italy) Nicola Carraro	KTM	6	Accident	29	
Ret	24	(Japan) Tatsuki Suzuki	Honda	4	Accident	1	
Ret	96	(Spain) Daniel Holgado	KTM	3	Accident	21	
Ret	34	(Japan) Kanta Hamada	Honda	3	Accident	27	
Ret	99	(Spain) Carlos Tatay	CFMoto	0	Accident	11	
Ret	66	(Australia) Joel Kelso	KTM	0	Accident	22	
Ret	70	(United Kingdom) Joshua Whatley	Honda	0	Accident	24	
Fastest lap: (Spain) Jaume Masià (KTM) – 1:57.360 (lap 7)
OFFICIAL MOTO3 RACE REPORT

== Championship standings after the race ==
Below are the standings for the top five riders, constructors, and teams after the round.

=== MotoGP ===
Riders' Championship standings

Pos.	Rider	Points
1	(France) Fabio Quartararo	219
2	(Italy) Francesco Bagnaia	201
3	(Spain) Aleix Espargaró	194
4	(Italy) Enea Bastianini	170
5	(Australia) Jack Miller	159

Constructors' Championship standings

Pos.	Constructor	Points
1	(Italy) Ducati	371
2	(Italy) Aprilia	226
3	(Japan) Yamaha	221
4	(Austria) KTM	181
5	(Japan) Suzuki	134

Teams' Championship standings

	Pos.	Team	Points
	1	(Italy) Ducati Lenovo Team	360
	2	(Italy) Aprilia Racing	307
1	3	(Italy) Prima Pramac Racing	258
1	4	(Austria) Red Bull KTM Factory Racing	254
2	5	(Japan) Monster Energy Yamaha MotoGP	247

=== Moto2 ===
Riders' Championship standings

Pos.	Rider	Points
1	(Spain) Augusto Fernández	234
2	(Japan) Ai Ogura	232
3	(Spain) Arón Canet	177
4	(Italy) Celestino Vietti	162
5	(Italy) Tony Arbolino	138

Constructors' Championship standings

Pos.	Constructor	Points
1	(Germany) Kalex	395
2	(Italy) Boscoscuro	137
3	(Italy) MV Agusta	5

Teams' Championship standings

	Pos.	Team	Points
	1	(Finland) Red Bull KTM Ajo	366
	2	(Japan) Idemitsu Honda Team Asia	352
	3	(Spain) Flexbox HP40	260
1	4	(Spain) Shimoko GasGas Aspar Team	194
1	5	(Belgium) Elf Marc VDS Racing Team	189

=== Moto3 ===
Riders' Championship standings

Pos.	Rider	Points
1	(Spain) Izan Guevara	254
2	(Spain) Sergio García	209
3	(Italy) Dennis Foggia	191
4	(Japan) Ayumu Sasaki	174
5	(Spain) Jaume Masià	155

Constructors' Championship standings

Pos.	Constructor	Points
1	(Spain) Gas Gas	312
2	(Japan) Honda	275
3	(Austria) KTM	257
4	(Sweden) Husqvarna	210
5	(China) CFMoto	115

Teams' Championship standings

Pos.	Team	Points
1	(Spain) AutoSolar GasGas Aspar Team	463
2	(Luxembourg) Leopard Racing	319
3	(Finland) Red Bull KTM Ajo	238
4	(Italy) Sterilgarda Husqvarna Max	236
5	(France) Red Bull KTM Tech3	194

Previous race: 2022 Aragon Grand Prix	FIM Grand Prix World Championship; 2022 season	Next race: 2022 Thailand Grand Prix
Previous race: 2019 Japanese Grand Prix	Japanese motorcycle Grand Prix	Next race: 2023 Japanese Grand Prix
