= Lorenzo Fellon =

French motorcycle racer

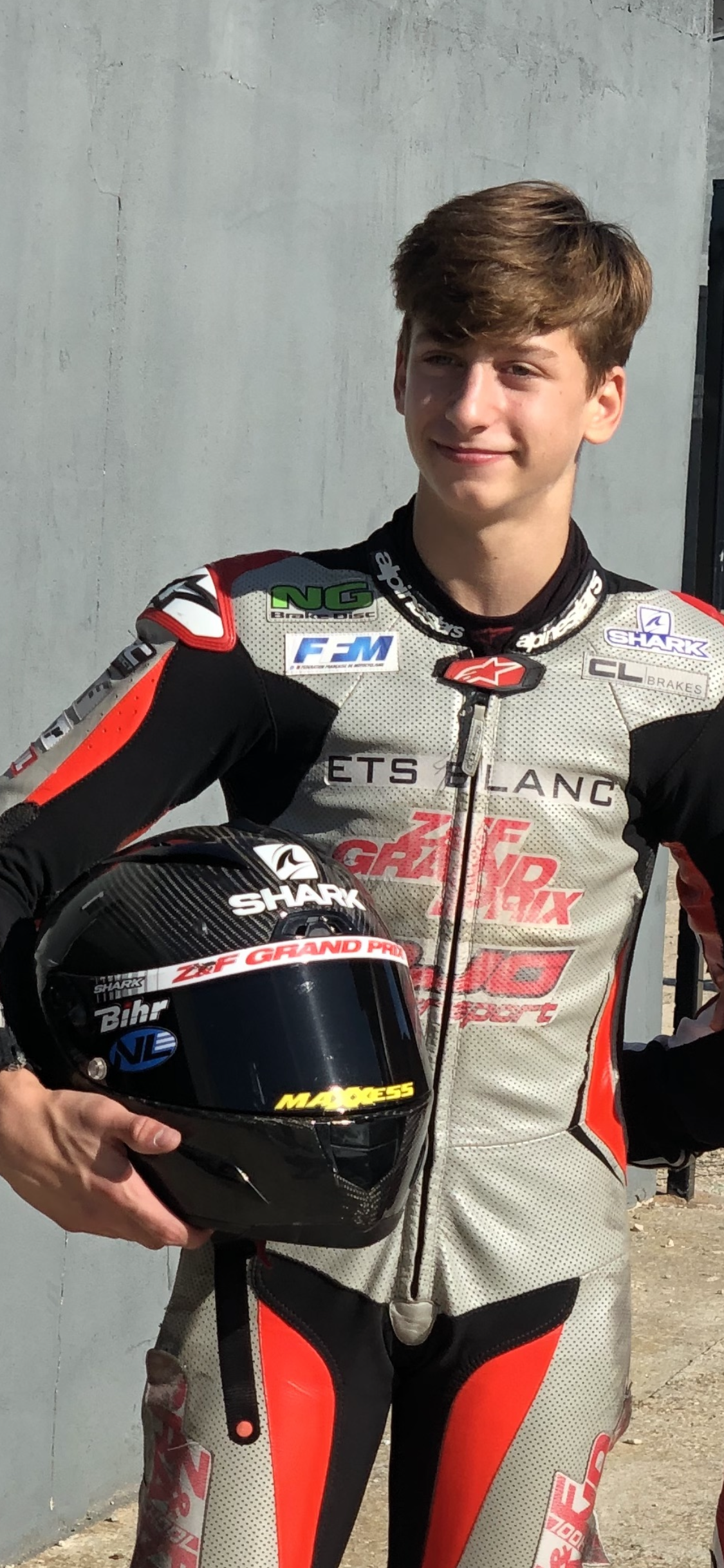
- Fellon in 2020
- Nationality: French
- Born: 15 July 2004 (age 22); Avignon, France
- Current team: SF Racing
- Bike number: 5
Motorcycle racing career statistics
Moto3 World Championship
Active years	2021–2023
Manufacturers	Honda (2021–2022); KTM (2023)
2023 championship position	27th (6 pts)
Starts / Wins / Podiums / Poles / F. laps / Points; 49 / 0 / 0 / 0 / 0 / 17

Lorenzo Fellon (born 15 July 2004) is a French motorcycle rider, who currently competes in the 2026 FIM Stock European Championship for SF Racing team, riding a Yamaha. Fellon has previously raced in Moto3 for CIP Green Power Team, and Sic58 Squadra Corse.

== Career ==
=== Early career ===
Fellon began racing in 2014, winning the Coupe de France PW50.

==== 2019 ====
During the 2019 season, Fellon participated in the 2019 Red Bull MotoGP Rookies Cup. He finished all twelve races of the championship in the points, with a fourth place finish in the last race of the season at Aragón. He finished the season fifth in the standings collecting 116 points, and was one of only two riders to not retire from any round.

==== 2020 ====
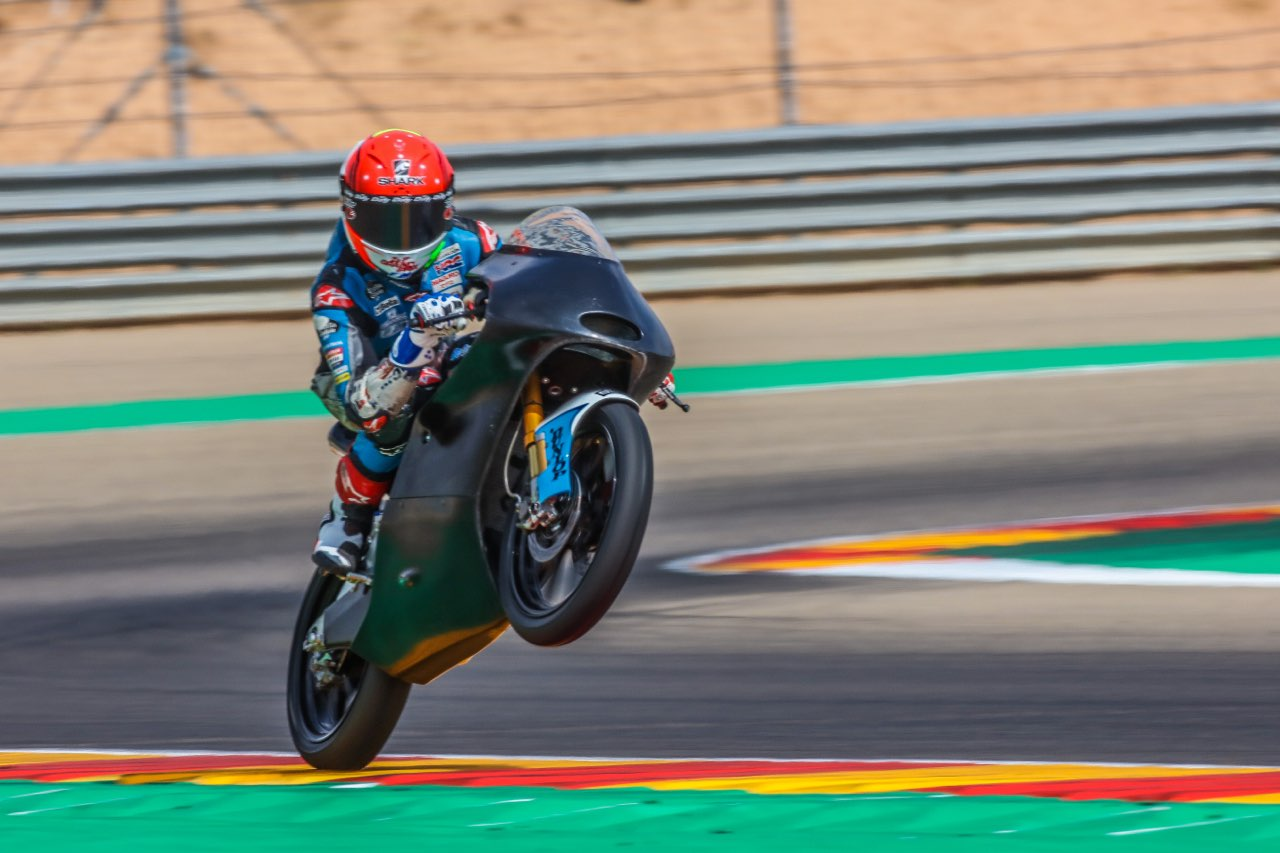
Fellon in 2020

Fellon made his debut in the 2020 FIM CEV Moto3 Junior World Championship with Junior team 0,0 Estrella Galicia. He started the season without scoring points on the first two races, retiring in a crash in first race in Jerez. From the following race onwards until the second race in Valencia, he scored points in all races, obtaining his best result of 4th in the first race at Aragón.

=== Moto3 World Championship ===
==== Sic58 Squadra Corse (2021–2022) ====
In 2021, Fellon debuted in the Moto3 World Championship with SIC58 Squadra Corse. He was the only full-time rider to not score a point in the 2021 season.

==== CIP Green Power (from 2023) ====
From 2023 season, Fellon competed for the CIP Green Power racing team.

== Career statistics ==
=== European Talent Cup ===
==== Races by year ====
(key) (Races in bold indicate pole position; races in italics indicate fastest lap)

Year	Bike	1	2	3	4	5	6	7	8	9	10	11	Pts	Pos
2018	Honda	EST1; Ret	EST2; Ret	VAL1; 20	VAL2; 16	CAT; 7	ARA1; 11	ARA2; 8	JER1; 10	JER2; 9	ALB; 10	VAL; 12	16th	45
2019	Honda	EST	EST	**VAL**; 10	VAL; 5	CAT; 6	ARA; Ret	ARA; Ret	JER; 10	JER; 6	ALB; 15	VAL; Ret	13th	44

=== Red Bull MotoGP Rookies Cup ===
==== Races by year ====
(key) (Races in bold indicate pole position; races in italics indicate fastest lap)

Year	1	2	3	4	5	6	7	8	9	10	11	12	Pos	Pts
2019	JER1; 5	JER2; 11	MUG; 5	ASS1; 6	ASS2; 7	SAC1; 5	SAC2; 7	RBR1; 5	RBR2; 10	MIS; 6	ARA1; 6	ARA2; 4	5th	116

=== FIM CEV Moto3 Junior World Championship ===
==== Races by year ====
(key) (Races in bold indicate pole position, races in italics indicate fastest lap)

Year	Bike	1	2	3	4	5	6	7	8	9	10	11	Pos	Pts
2020	Honda	EST; 24	POR; 17	JER1; Ret	JER2; 14	JER3; 9	ARA1; 4	ARA2; 10	ARA3; 7	VAL1; 15	VAL2; 10	VAL3; 13	11th	47

=== FIM Moto2 European Championship ===
==== Races by year ====
(key) (Races in bold indicate pole position, races in italics indicate fastest lap)

Year	Bike	1	2	3	4	5	6	7	8	9	10	11	Pos	Pts
2024	Kalex	MIS; 11	EST1; 14	EST2; 11	CAT1; 12	CAT2; 12	POR1; Ret	POR2; 13	JER; 10	ARA1; 15	ARA2; 13	EST	14th	33
2025	Kalex	EST1; 13	EST2; 16	JER; Ret	MAG1; 13	MAG2; 13	ARA1; Ret	ARA2; 13	MIS; 8	CAT1; 16	CAT2; 18	VAL; 10	18th	26

=== FIM Stock European Championship ===
==== Races by year ====
(key) (Races in bold indicate pole position; races in italics indicate fastest lap)

Year	Bike	1	2	3	4	5	6	7	Pos	Pts
2026	Yamaha	CAT; 3	EST; 5	JER; 7	MAG; 1	**VAL**; 1	ARA; 2	MIS; 5	1st	117

=== Grand Prix motorcycle racing ===
==== By season ====
Season	Class	Motorcycle	Team	Race	Win	Podium	Pole	FLap	Pts	Plcd
2021	Moto3	Honda	Sic58 Squadra Corse	18	0	0	0	0	0	33rd
2022	Moto3	Honda	Sic58 Squadra Corse	19	0	0	0	0	11	25th
2023	Moto3	KTM	CIP Green Power	12	0	0	0	0	6	27th
Total				**49**	**0**	**0**	**0**	**0**	**17**	

==== By class ====
Class	Seasons	1st GP	1st pod	1st win	Race	Win	Podiums	Pole	FLap	Pts	WChmp
Moto3	2021–present	2021 Qatar			49	0	0	0	0	17	0
Total	2021–present				**49**	**0**	**0**	**0**	**0**	**17**	**0**

==== Races by year ====
(key) (Races in bold indicate pole position; races in italics indicate fastest lap)

Year	Class	Bike	1	2	3	4	5	6	7	8	9	10	11	12	13	14	15	16	17	18	19	20	Pos	Pts
2021	Moto3	Honda	QAT; 19	DOH; 20	POR; 22	SPA; 23	FRA; 19	ITA; 19	CAT; 16	GER; Ret	NED; 21	STY; 16	AUT; 17	GBR; 22	ARA; Ret	RSM; 19	AME; 16	EMI; 19	ALR; 17	VAL; Ret			33rd	0
2022	Moto3	Honda	QAT; Ret	INA; 16	ARG; 19	AME; 15	POR; 14	SPA; DNS	FRA; 23	ITA; 14	CAT; 20	GER; 18	NED; 13	GBR; 13	AUT; 16	RSM; 18	ARA; Ret	JPN; Ret	THA; 16	AUS; 19	MAL; 19	VAL; 20	25th	11
2023	Moto3	KTM	POR; DNS	ARG	AME	SPA	FRA	ITA	GER	NED	GBR; 24	AUT; 24	CAT; 23	RSM; 24	IND; 17	JPN; 21	INA; 23	AUS; 10	THA; 21	MAL; 16	QAT; 24	VAL; Ret	27th	6
