= 2022 Valencian Community motorcycle Grand Prix =

Twentieth round of the 2022 Grand Prix motorcycle racing season

2022 Valencian Community Grand Prix
Race details
- Race 20 of 20 races in the 2022 Grand Prix motorcycle racing season
- Date: 6 November 2022
- Official name: Gran Premio Motul de la Comunitat Valenciana
- Location: Circuit Ricardo Tormo; Cheste, Valencia, Spain
- Course: Permanent racing facility; 4.005 km (2.489 mi)

MotoGP
Pole position
Rider	(Spain) Jorge Martín	Ducati
Time	1:29.621	
Fastest lap
Rider	(South Africa) Brad Binder	KTM
Time	1:31.192 on lap 13	
Podium
First	(Spain) Álex Rins	Suzuki
Second	(South Africa) Brad Binder	KTM
Third	(Spain) Jorge Martín	Ducati

Moto2
Pole position
Rider	(Spain) Alonso López	Boscoscuro
Time	1:34.314	
Fastest lap
Rider	(United States) Cameron Beaubier	Kalex
Time	1:34.850 on lap 3	
Podium
First	(Spain) Pedro Acosta	Kalex
Second	(Spain) Augusto Fernández	Kalex
Third	(Italy) Tony Arbolino	Kalex

Moto3
Pole position
Rider	(Spain) Izan Guevara	Gas Gas
Time	1:38.479	
Fastest lap
Rider	(Turkey) Deniz Öncü	KTM
Time	1:38.790 on lap 3	
Podium
First	(Spain) Izan Guevara	Gas Gas
Second	(Turkey) Deniz Öncü	KTM
Third	(Spain) Sergio García	Gas Gas

The 2022 Valencian Community motorcycle Grand Prix (officially known as the Gran Premio Motul de la Comunitat Valenciana) was the twentieth and final round of the 2022 Grand Prix motorcycle racing season. It was held at the Circuit Ricardo Tormo in Valencia on 6 November 2022.

The MotoGP riders' championship was decided in this race between Fabio Quartararo and Francesco Bagnaia. Bagnaia secured his first MotoGP riders' title after finishing in ninth, as Quartararo's fourth-place-finish was eventually not enough to successfully defend his title. This was also the last race for Suzuki as a factory team in the premier class since they returned in 2015.

In the Moto2 class, Augusto Fernández claimed the riders' title by finishing in second behind Pedro Acosta as his closest championship rival Ai Ogura retired after an accident. This was also the final Grand Prix in Moto2 for Simone Corsi, Cameron Beaubier, and Marcel Schrötter.

== Background ==
=== Riders' entries ===
In MotoGP, Takaaki Nakagami returned to racing after missing several races due to injury recovery. In the Moto2 class, Barry Baltus missed the race after suffering a foot injury, RW Racing GP replaced him with Mattia Pasini. Senna Agius replacing Sam Lowes for Marc VDS Team. The Spanish rider Álex Escrig runs as a wildcard for the Forward Racing. In the Moto3 class, the Italian junior rider Filippo Farioli who made his debut as a wildcard for GasGas Aspar Team, together with David Almansa races as a wildcard for Finetwork Team Boé Motorsports. David Salvador replaces Stefano Nepa from Angeluss MTA Team who was absent due to injury.

== Free practice session ==
=== MotoGP ===
==== Combinated Free Practice 1-2-3 ====
The top ten riders (written in bold) qualified in Q2.

Fastest session lap

Pos.	No.	Biker	Constructor	Free practice times		
Pos.	No.	Biker	Constructor	FP1	FP2	FP3
1	43	**(Australia) Jack Miller**	**Ducati**	1:31.542	1:30.345	**1:29.921**
2	5	**(France) Johann Zarco**	**Ducati**	1:31.684	1:30.424	**1:30.026**
3	33	**(South Africa) Brad Binder**	**KTM**	1:31.470	1:30.519	**1:30.188**
4	10	**(Italy) Luca Marini**	**Ducati**	1:31.874	**1:30.217**	1:30.554
5	20	**(France) Fabio Quartararo**	**Yamaha**	1:31.399	1:30.442	**1:30.231**
6	93	**(Spain) Marc Márquez**	**Honda**	1:31.434	1:30.390	**1:30.279**
7	41	**(Spain) Aleix Espargaró**	**Aprilia**	1:31.782	1:30.890	**1:30.300**
8	89	**(Spain) Jorge Martín**	**Ducati**	1:31.762	**1:30.322**	1:30.495
9	63	**(Italy) Francesco Bagnaia**	**Ducati**	1:31.999	1:30.447	**1:30.324**
10	36	**(Spain) Joan Mir**	**Suzuki**	1:31.809	1:31.004	**1:30.383**
11	42	(Spain) Álex Rins	Suzuki	1:31.564	1:30.707	**1:30.388**
12	23	(Italy) Enea Bastianini	Ducati	1:31.917	**1:30.394**	1:30.415
13	88	(Portugal) Miguel Oliveira	KTM	1:31.775	**1:30.422**	1:30.446
14	21	(Italy) Franco Morbidelli	Yamaha	1:31.915	1:31.016	**1:30.431**
15	12	(Spain) Maverick Viñales	Aprilia	1:31.993	1:30.814	**1:30.581**
16	73	(Spain) Alex Márquez	Honda	1:32.068	1:31.148	**1:30.868**
17	44	(Spain) Pol Espargaró	Honda	1:32.116	1:31.249	**1:30.957**
18	72	(Italy) Marco Bezzecchi	Ducati	1:32.159	**1:31.014**	1:31.687
19	87	(Australia) Remy Gardner	KTM	1:31.977	1:31.621	**1:31.506**
20	30	(Japan) Takaaki Nakagami	Honda	1:32.982	1:31.672	**1:31.093**
21	49	(Italy) Fabio Di Giannantonio	Ducati	1:32.604	1:31.762	**1:31.097**
22	35	(United Kingdom) Cal Crutchlow	Yamaha	1:32.274	1:31.345	**1:31.121**
23	25	(Spain) Raúl Fernández	KTM	1:31.881	**1:31.598**	1:32.468
24	40	(South Africa) Darryn Binder	Yamaha	1:33.969	1:32.420	**1:31.753**
OFFICIAL MOTOGP COMBINED FREE PRACTICE TIMES REPORT

==== Free Practice 4 ====
Fastest session lap

Pos.	No.	Biker	Constructor	
Pos.	No.	Biker	Constructor	Time results
1	88	(Portugal) Miguel Oliveira	KTM	**1:30.762**
2	20	(France) Fabio Quartararo	Yamaha	1:30.996
3	89	(Spain) Jorge Martín	Ducati	1:31.044
4	44	(Spain) Pol Espargaró	Honda	1:31.051
5	5	(France) Johann Zarco	Ducati	1:31.072
6	10	(Italy) Luca Marini	Ducati	1:31.096
7	43	(Australia) Jack Miller	Ducati	1:31.123
8	36	(Spain) Joan Mir	Suzuki	1:31.160
9	33	(South Africa) Brad Binder	KTM	1:31.176
10	12	(Spain) Maverick Viñales	Aprilia	1:31.177
11	63	(Italy) Francesco Bagnaia	Ducati	1:31.270
12	41	(Spain) Aleix Espargaró	Aprilia	1:31.276
13	23	(Italy) Enea Bastianini	Ducati	1:31.360
14	72	(Italy) Marco Bezzecchi	Ducati	1:31.389
15	93	(Spain) Marc Márquez	Honda	1:31.431
16	21	(Italy) Franco Morbidelli	Yamaha	1:31.434
17	35	(United Kingdom) Cal Crutchlow	Yamaha	1:31.449
18	73	(Spain) Álex Márquez	Honda	1:31.453
19	42	(Spain) Álex Rins	Suzuki	1:31.541
20	30	(Japan) Takaaki Nakagami	Honda	1:31.633
21	49	(Italy) Fabio Di Giannantonio	Ducati	1:31.808
22	87	(Australia) Remy Gardner	KTM	1:31.917
23	40	(South Africa) Darryn Binder	Yamaha	1:32.350
NC	25	(Spain) Raúl Fernández	KTM	
OFFICIAL MOTOGP FREE PRACTICE NR.4 TIMES REPORT

- Raúl Fernández suffered a crash during practice and was taken to the medical center for examination.

=== Moto2 ===
==== Combinated Free Practice 1-2-3 ====
The top fourteen riders (written in bold) qualified in Q2.

Fastest session lap

Pos.	No.	Biker	Constructor	Free practice times		
Pos.	No.	Biker	Constructor	FP1	FP2	FP3
1	51	**(Spain) Pedro Acosta**	**Kalex**	1:35.206	1:34.968	1:34.592
2	37	**(Spain) Augusto Fernández**	**Kalex**	1:34.979	1:35.069	1:34.658
3	40	**(Spain) Arón Canet**	**Kalex**	1:36.090	1:35.901	1:34.664
4	21	**(Spain) Alonso López**	**Boscoscuro**	1:36.466	1:35.128	1:34.786
5	96	**(United Kingdom)** **Jake Dixon**	**Kalex**	1:36.055	1:35.554	1:34.953
6	54	**(Spain)** **Fermín Aldeguer**	**Boscoscuro**	1:36.364	1:35.862	1:35.016
7	79	**(Japan)** **Ai Ogura**	**Kalex**	1:36.109	1:35.853	1:35.111
8	19	**(Italy) Lorenzo Dalla Porta**	**Kalex**	1:36.765	1:36.387	1:35.172
9	75	**(Spain) Albert Arenas**	**Kalex**	1:36.229	1:36.229	1:35.207
10	6	(United States) **Cameron Beaubier**	**Kalex**	1:35.811	1:35.811	1:35.217
11	11	**(Italy) Mattia Pasini**	**Kalex**	1:36.819	1:35.623	1:35.254
12	52	**(Spain) Jeremy Alcoba**	**Kalex**	1:37.533	1:36.105	1:35.260
13	12	**(Czech Republic) Filip Salač**	**Kalex**	1:36.944	1:36.110	1:35.268
14	35	**(Thailand) Somkiat Chantra**	**Kalex**	1:36.141	1:35.571	1:35.277
15	8	(Australia) Senna Agius	Kalex	1:36.513	1:36.044	1:35.327
16	23	(Germany) Marcel Schrötter	Kalex	1:36.518	1:36.153	1:35.360
17	13	(Italy) Celestino Vietti	Kalex	1:36.366	1:36.053	1:35.364
18	14	(Italy) Tony Arbolino	Kalex	1:36.098	1:35.681	1:35.369
19	18	(Spain) Manuel González	Kalex	1:37.666	1:36.241	1:35.526
20	72	(Spain) Borja Gómez	Kalex	1:36.366	1:35.724	1:35.546
21	17	(Spain) Álex Escrig	MV Agusta	1:37.870	1:35.908	1:35.666
22	64	(Netherlands) Bo Bendsneyder	Kalex	1:37.139	1:36.624	1:35.703
23	16	(United States) Joe Roberts	Kalex	1:37.028	1:35.958	1:35.745
24	61	(Italy) Alessandro Zaccone	Kalex	1:37.202	1:36.264	1:35.781
25	29	(Japan) Taiga Hada	Kalex	1:37.311	1:36.668	1:35.884
26	81	(Thailand) Keminth Kubo	Kalex	1:37.352	1:36.527	1:35.957
27	4	(United States) Sean Dylan Kelly	Kalex	1:37.555	1:37.105	1:36.091
28	24	(Italy) Simone Corsi	MV Agusta	1:37.064	1:36.309	1:36.201
29	42	(Spain) Marcos Ramírez	MV Agusta	1:38.319	1:39.684	1:36.320
30	28	(Italy) Niccolò Antonelli	Kalex	1:37.652	1:37.129	1:36.416
31	84	(Netherlands) Zonta van den Goorbergh	Kalex	1:38.975	1:37.469	1:36.522
OFFICIAL MOTO2 COMBINED FREE PRACTICE TIMES REPORT

=== Moto3 ===
==== Combinated Free Practice 1-2-3 ====
The top fourteen riders (written in bold) qualified in Q2.

Fastest session lap

Pos.	No.	Biker	Constructor	Free practice times		
Pos.	No.	Biker	Constructor	FP1	FP2	FP3
1	6	**(Japan) Ryusei Yamanaka**	**KTM**	1:39.905	1:39.794	1:38.482
2	48	(Spain) **Iván Ortolá**	**KTM**	1:40.486	1:40.398	1:38.537
3	10	**(Brazil) Diogo Moreira**	**KTM**	1:39.543	1:39.599	1:38.585
4	7	**(Italy) Dennis Foggia**	**Honda**	1:39.780	1:39.488	1:38.627
5	28	**(Spain) Izan Guevara**	**Gas Gas**	1:39.533	1:39.909	1:38.684
6	11	**(Spain) Sergio García**	**Gas Gas**	1:39.855	1:39.586	1:38.720
7	43	**(Spain) Xavier Artigas**	**CFMoto**	1:39.938	1:39.642	1:38.920
8	24	**(Japan) Tatsuki Suzuki**	**Honda**	1:40.145	1:39.467	1:38.959
9	17	**(United Kingdom)** **John McPhee**	**Husqvarna**	1:39.847	1:39.837	1:38.974
10	38	(Spain) **David Salvador**	**KTM**	1:40.636	1:39.597	1:39.076
11	96	**(Spain)** **Daniel Holgado**	**KTM**	1:39.683	1:39.671	1:39.109
12	99	(Spain) **Carlos Tatay**	**CFMoto**	1:40.936	1:39.537	1:39.122
13	53	**(Turkey)** **Deniz Öncü**	**KTM**	1:39.722	1:40.405	1:39.126
14	54	**(Italy) Riccardo Rossi**	**Honda**	1:40.116	1:40.627	1:39.179
15	66	(Australia) Joel Kelso	KTM	1:40.518	1:40.795	1:39.196
16	71	(Japan) Ayumu Sasaki	Husqvarna	1:39.715	1:40.217	1:39.320
17	5	(Spain) Jaume Masià	KTM	1:40.545	1:40.375	1:39.322
18	16	(Italy) Andrea Migno	Honda	1:40.231	1:40.999	1:39.438
19	27	(Japan) Kaito Toba	KTM	1:40.030	1:40.799	1:39.443
20	44	(Spain) David Muñoz	KTM	1:40.629	1:39.935	1:39.486
21	31	(Spain) Adrián Fernández	KTM	1:40.296	1:39.996	1:39.643
22	77	(Italy) Filippo Farioli	KTM	1:40.215	1:41.290	1:39.918
23	9	(Italy) Nicola Carraro	KTM	1:41.485	1:40.931	1:39.963
24	20	(France) Lorenzo Fellon	Honda	1:41.347	1:40.805	1:40.024
25	95	(Spain) David Almansa	KTM	1:40.800	1:40.284	1:40.145
26	64	(Indonesia) Mario Aji	Honda	1:42.002	1:41.343	1:40.194
27	72	(Japan) Taiyo Furusato	Honda	1:41.912	1:40.943	1:40.224
28	19	(United Kingdom) Scott Ogden	Honda	1:41.902	1:41.374	1:40.410
29	23	(Italy) Elia Bartolini	Honda	1:42.032	1:40.796	1:40.647
30	67	(Italy) Alberto Surra	Honda	1:41.706	1:41.798	1:40.651
31	70	(United Kingdom) Joshua Whatley	Honda	1:41.467	1:41.962	1:40.831
32	22	(Spain) Ana Carrasco	KTM	1:43.015	1:42.460	1:40.882
OFFICIAL MOTO3 COMBINED FREE PRACTICE TIMES REPORT

== Qualifying ==
=== MotoGP ===
Fastest session lap

Pos.	No.	Biker	Constructor	Qualifying times		Final grid	Row
Pos.	No.	Biker	Constructor	Q1	Q2	Final grid	Row
1	89	(Spain) Jorge Martín	Ducati	Qualified in Q2	1:29.621	1	1
2	93	(Spain) Marc Márquez	Honda	Qualified in Q2	1:29.826	2	1
3	43	(Australia) Jack Miller	Ducati	Qualified in Q2	1:29.834	3	1
4	20	(France) Fabio Quartararo	Yamaha	Qualified in Q2	1:29.900	4	2
5	42	(Spain) Álex Rins	Suzuki	1:30.126	1:29.940	5	2
6	12	(Spain) Maverick Viñales	Aprilia	1:30.090	1:29.955	6	2
7	33	(South Africa) Brad Binder	KTM	Qualified in Q2	1:30.039	7	3
8	63	(Italy) Francesco Bagnaia	Ducati	Qualified in Q2	1:30.049	8	3
9	5	(France) Johann Zarco	Ducati	Qualified in Q2	1:30.102	9	3
10	41	(Spain) Aleix Espargaró	Aprilia	Qualified in Q2	1:30.102	10	4
11	10	(Italy) Luca Marini	Ducati	Qualified in Q2	1:30.143	11	4
12	36	(Spain) Joan Mir	Suzuki	Qualified in Q2	1:30.241	12	4
13	23	(Italy) Enea Bastianini	Ducati	1:30.193	N/A	13	5
14	88	(Portugal) Miguel Oliveira	KTM	1:30.236	N/A	14	5
15	73	(Spain) Álex Márquez	Honda	1:30.453	N/A	15	5
16	21	(Italy) Franco Morbidelli	Yamaha	1:30.504	N/A	16	6
17	35	(United Kingdom) Cal Crutchlow	Yamaha	1:30.548	N/A	17	6
18	72	(Italy) Marco Bezzecchi	Ducati	1:30.588	N/A	18	6
19	49	(Italy) Fabio Di Giannantonio	Ducati	1:30.695	N/A	19	7
20	87	(Australia) Remy Gardner	KTM	1:30.804	N/A	20	7
21	30	(Japan) Takaaki Nakagami	Honda	1:30.830	N/A	21	7
22	25	(Spain) Pol Espargaró	Honda	1:30.936	N/A	22	8
23	25	(Spain) Raúl Fernández	KTM	1:31.676	N/A	23	8
24	40	(South Africa) Darryn Binder	Yamaha	1:31.989	N/A	24	8
OFFICIAL MOTOGP QUALIFYING RESULTS

=== Moto2 ===
Fastest session lap

Pos.	No.	Biker	Constructor	Qualifying times		Final grid	Row
Pos.	No.	Biker	Constructor	Q1	Q2	Final grid	Row
1	21	(Spain) Alonso López	Boscoscuro	Qualified in Q2	1:34.314	1	1
2	51	(Spain) Pedro Acosta	Kalex	Qualified in Q2	1:34.315	2	1
3	37	(Spain) Augusto Fernández	Kalex	Qualified in Q2	1:34.481	3	1
4	14	(Italy) Tony Arbolino	Kalex	1:34.782	1:34.583	4	2
5	79	(Japan) Ai Ogura	Kalex	Qualified in Q2	1:34.665	5	2
6	16	(United States) Joe Roberts	Kalex	1:34.956	1:34.674	6	2
7	40	(Spain) Arón Canet	Kalex	Qualified in Q2	1:34.765	7	3
8	54	(Spain) Fermín Aldeguer	Boscoscuro	Qualified in Q2	1:34.771	8	3
9	13	(Italy) Celestino Vietti	Kalex	1:34.758	1:34.773	9	3
10	19	(Italy) Lorenzo Dalla Porta	Kalex	Qualified in Q2	1:34.866	10	4
11	75	(Spain) Albert Arenas	Kalex	Qualified in Q2	1:34.875	11	4
12	35	(Thailand) Somkiat Chantra	Kalex	Qualified in Q2	1:34.907	12	4
13	6	(United States) Cameron Beaubier	Kalex	Qualified in Q2	1:34.920	13	5
14	18	(Spain) Manuel González	Kalex	1:34.946	1:34.928	14	5
15	96	(United Kingdom) Jake Dixon	Kalex	Qualified in Q2	1:34.976	15	5
16	12	(Czech Republic) Filip Salač	Kalex	Qualified in Q2	1:35.138	16	6
17	11	(Italy) Mattia Pasini	Kalex	Qualified in Q2	1:35.139	17	6
18	52	(Spain) Jeremy Alcoba	Kalex	Qualified in Q2	1:35.258	18	6
19	8	(Australia) Senna Agius	Kalex	1:35.076	N/A	19	7
20	64	(Netherlands) Bo Bendsneyder	Kalex	1:35.080	N/A	20	7
21	72	(Spain) Borja Gómez	Kalex	1:35.109	N/A	21	7
22	23	(Germany) Marcel Schrötter	Kalex	1:35.165	N/A	22	8
23	61	(Italy) Alessandro Zaccone	Kalex	1:35.282	N/A	23	8
24	17	(Spain) Álex Escrig	Kalex	1:35.409	N/A	24	8
25	29	(Japan) Taiga Hada	Kalex	1:35.474	N/A	25	9
26	24	(Italy) Simone Corsi	MV Agusta	1:35,631	N/A	26	9
27	4	(United States) Sean Dylan Kelly	Kalex	1:35.737	N/A	27	9
28	81	(Thailand) Keminth Kubo	Kalex	1:35.823	N/A	28	10
29	42	(Spain) Marcos Ramírez	MV Agusta	1:35.910	N/A	29	10
30	84	(Netherlands) Zonta van den Goorbergh	Kalex	1:35.956	N/A	30	10
31	28	(Italy) Niccolò Antonelli	Kalex	1:36.160	N/A	31	11
OFFICIAL MOTO2 QUALIFYING RESULTS							11

=== Moto3 ===
Fastest session lap

Pos.	No.	Biker	Constructor	Qualifying times		Final grid	Row
Pos.	No.	Biker	Constructor	Q1	Q2	Final grid	Row
1	28	(Spain) Izan Guevara	Gas Gas	Qualified in Q2	1:38.479	1	1
2	53	(Turkey) Deniz Öncü	KTM	Qualified in Q2	1:38.525	2	1
3	11	(Spain) Sergio García	Gas Gas	Qualified in Q2	1:38.654	3	1
4	10	(Brazil) Diogo Moreira	KTM	Qualified in Q2	1:38.697	4	2
5	71	(Japan) Ayumu Sasaki	Husqvarna	1:38.857	1:38.761	5	2
6	48	(Spain) Iván Ortolá	KTM	Qualified in Q2	1:38.797	6	2
7	7	(Italy) Dennis Foggia	Honda	Qualified in Q2	1:38.856	7	3
8	24	(Japan) Tatsuki Suzuki	Honda	Qualified in Q2	1:38.875	8	3
9	6	(Japan) Ryusei Yamanaka	KTM	Qualified in Q2	1:38.927	9	3
10	17	(United Kingdom) John McPhee	Husqvarna	Qualified in Q2	1:38.949	10	4
11	5	(Spain) Jaume Masià	KTM	1:39.096	1:39.016	11	4
12	54	(Italy) Riccardo Rossi	Honda	Qualified in Q2	1:39.018	12	4
13	38	(Spain) David Salvador	KTM	Qualified in Q2	1:39.021	13	5
14	44	(Spain) David Muñoz	KTM	1:39.180	1:39.039	14	5
15	96	(Spain) Daniel Holgado	KTM	Qualified in Q2	1:39.146	15	5
16	43	(Spain) Xavier Artigas	CFMoto	Qualified in Q2	1:39.167	16	6
17	99	(Spain) Carlos Tatay	CFMoto	Qualified in Q2	1:39.262	17	6
18	9	(Italy) Nicola Carraro	KTM	1:39.268	1:39.307	18	6
19	66	(Australia) Joel Kelso	KTM	1:39.486	N/A	19	7
20	77	(Italy) Filippo Farioli	Gas Gas	1:39.513	N/A	20	7
21	23	(Italy) Elia Bartolini	KTM	1:39.579	N/A	21	7
22	95	(Spain) David Almansa	KTM	1:39.626	N/A	22	8
23	20	(France) Lorenzo Fellon	Honda	1:39.781	N/A	23	8
24	16	(Italy) Andrea Migno	Honda	1:39.788	N/A	24	8
25	27	(Japan) Kaito Toba	KTM	1:39.836	N/A	25	9
26	31	(Spain) Adrián Fernández	KTM	1:39.958	N/A	26	9
27	19	(United Kingdom) Scott Ogden	Honda	1:40.049	N/A	27	9
28	67	(Italy) Alberto Surra	Honda	1:40.064	N/A	28	10
29	72	(Japan) Taiyo Furusato	Honda	1:40.191	N/A	29	10
30	64	(Indonesia) Mario Aji	Honda	1:40.498	N/A	30	10
31	70	(United Kingdom) Joshua Whatley	Honda	1:40.735	N/A	31	11
32	22	(Spain) Ana Carrasco	KTM	1:41.384	N/A	32	11
OFFICIAL MOTO3 QUALIFYING RESULTS							11

== Warm up practice ==
=== MotoGP ===
Johann Zarco set the best time and was the fastest rider at this session ahead of Marc Márquez and Jack Miller.

=== Moto2 ===
Pedro Acosta finished at the top of the standings at this session, a head of Alonso López and Arón Canet.

=== Moto3 ===
The first places in the ranking are occupied by Deniz Öncü at this session with a time of 1:39.553, followed by Diogo Moreira in second and Izan Guevara in third.

== Race results ==
=== MotoGP ===
Pos.	No.	Biker	Team	Constructor	Laps	Time/Retired	Grid	Points
1	42	(Spain) Álex Rins	Team Suzuki Ecstar	Suzuki	27	41:22.250	5	25
2	33	(South Africa) Brad Binder	Red Bull KTM Factory Racing	KTM	27	+0.396	7	20
3	89	(Spain) Jorge Martín	Prima Pramac Racing	Ducati	27	+1.059	1	16
4	20	(France) Fabio Quartararo	Monster Energy Yamaha MotoGP	Yamaha	27	+1.911	4	13
5	88	(Portugal) Miguel Oliveira	Red Bull KTM Factory Racing	KTM	27	+7.122	14	11
6	36	(Spain) Joan Mir	Team Suzuki Ecstar	Suzuki	27	+7.735	12	10
7	10	(Italy) Luca Marini	Mooney VR46 Racing Team	Ducati	27	+8.524	11	9
8	23	(Italy) Enea Bastianini	Gresini Racing MotoGP	Ducati	27	+12.038	13	8
9	63	(Italy) Francesco Bagnaia	Ducati Lenovo Team	Ducati	27	+14.441	8	7
10	21	(Italy) Franco Morbidelli	Monster Energy Yamaha MotoGP	Yamaha	27	+14.676	16	6
11	72	(Italy) Marco Bezzecchi	Mooney VR46 Racing Team	Ducati	27	+17.655	18	5
12	25	(Spain) Raúl Fernández	Tech3 KTM Factory Racing	KTM	27	+24.870	23	4
13	87	(Australia) Remy Gardner	Tech3 KTM Factory Racing	KTM	27	+26.546	20	3
14	30	(Japan) Takaaki Nakagami	LCR Honda Idemitsu	Honda	27	+26.610	21	2
15	49	(Italy) Fabio Di Giannantonio	Gresini Racing MotoGP	Ducati	27	+31.819	19	1
16	35	(United Kingdom) Cal Crutchlow	WithU Yamaha RNF MotoGP Team	Yamaha	27	+1:28.870	17	
17	73	(Spain) Álex Márquez	LCR Honda Castrol	Honda	26	+1 lap	15	
Ret	43	(Australia) Jack Miller	Ducati Lenovo Team	Ducati	22	Accident	3	
Ret	5	(France) Johann Zarco	Prima Pramac Racing	Ducati	15	Accident	9	
Ret	12	(Spain) Maverick Viñales	Aprilia Racing	Aprilia	15	Electronics	6	
Ret	93	(Spain) Marc Márquez	Repsol Honda Team	Honda	9	Accident	2	
Ret	44	(Spain) Pol Espargaró	Repsol Honda Team	Honda	4	Accident	22	
Ret	40	(South Africa) Darryn Binder	WithU Yamaha RNF MotoGP Team	Yamaha	4	Accident	24	
Ret	41	(Spain) Aleix Espargaró	Aprilia Racing	Aprilia	3	Engine	10	
Fastest lap: (South Africa) Brad Binder (KTM) – 1:31.192 (lap 13)
OFFICIAL MOTOGP RACE REPORT

=== Moto2 ===
Pos.	No.	Biker	Constructor	Laps	Time/Retired	Grid	Points
1	51	(Spain) Pedro Acosta	Kalex	25	39:52.413	2	25
2	37	(Spain) Augusto Fernández	Kalex	25	+1.232	3	20
3	14	(Italy) Tony Arbolino	Kalex	25	+10.163	4	16
4	54	(Spain) Fermín Aldeguer	Boscoscuro	25	+14.407	8	13
5	75	(Spain) Albert Arenas	Kalex	25	+18.904	11	11
6	18	(Spain) Manuel González	Kalex	25	+20.554	14	10
7	96	(United Kingdom) Jake Dixon	Kalex	25	+21.244	15	9
8	52	(Spain) Jeremy Alcoba	Kalex	25	+25.868	18	8
9	8	(Australia) Senna Agius	Kalex	25	+33.763	19	7
10	23	(Germany) Marcel Schrötter	Kalex	25	+35.117	22	6
11	64	(Netherlands) Bo Bendsneyder	Kalex	25	+35.598	20	5
12	72	(Spain) Borja Gómez	Kalex	25	+36.336	21	4
13	12	(Czech Republic) Filip Salač	Kalex	25	+38.942	16	3
14	19	(Italy) Lorenzo Dalla Porta	Kalex	25	+41.710	10	2
15	16	(United States) Joe Roberts	Kalex	25	+45.238	6	1
16	61	(Italy) Alessandro Zaccone	Kalex	25	+51.827	23	
17	81	(Thailand) Keminth Kubo	Kalex	25	+52.884	28	
18	4	(United States) Sean Dylan Kelly	Kalex	25	+53.109	27	
19	17	(Spain) Álex Escrig	MV Agusta	25	+55.179	24	
20	42	(Spain) Marcos Ramírez	MV Agusta	25	+55.627	29	
21	84	(Netherlands) Zonta van den Goorbergh	Kalex	25	+1:03.904	30	
22	29	(Japan) Taiga Hada	Kalex	23	+2 laps	25	
Ret	40	(Spain) Arón Canet	Kalex	19	Accident	7	
Ret	11	(Italy) Mattia Pasini	Kalex	18	Accident	17	
Ret	35	(Thailand) Somkiat Chantra	Kalex	14	Accident	12	
Ret	28	(Italy) Niccolò Antonelli	Kalex	14	Accident	31	
Ret	79	(Japan) Ai Ogura	Kalex	7	Accident	5	
Ret	13	(Italy) Celestino Vietti	Kalex	7	Accident	9	
Ret	6	(United States) Cameron Beaubier	Kalex	5	Accident	13	
Ret	21	(Spain) Alonso López	Boscoscuro	3	Accident	1	
Ret	24	(Italy) Simone Corsi	MV Agusta	0	Accident	26	
Fastest lap: (United States) Cameron Beaubier (Kalex) – 1:34.850 (lap 3)
OFFICIAL MOTO2 RACE REPORT

=== Moto3 ===
Pos.	No.	Biker	Constructor	Laps	Time/Retired	Grid	Points
1	28	(Spain) Izan Guevara	Gas Gas	23	38:10.406	1	25
2	53	(Turkey) Deniz Öncü	KTM	23	+0.062	2	20
3	11	(Spain) Sergio García	Gas Gas	23	+6.557	3	16
4	7	(Italy) Dennis Foggia	Honda	23	+14.133	7	13
5	71	(Japan) Ayumu Sasaki	Husqvarna	23	+14.574	5	11
6	31	(Spain) Adrián Fernández	KTM	23	+14.676	24	10
7	44	(Spain) David Muñoz	KTM	23	+14.889	13	9
8	10	(Brazil) Diogo Moreira	KTM	23	+15.048	4	8
9	6	(Japan) Ryusei Yamanaka	KTM	23	+15.288	9	7
10	96	(Spain) Daniel Holgado	KTM	23	+15.440	14	6
11	17	(United Kingdom) John McPhee	Husqvarna	23	+15.533	10	5
12	48	(Spain) Iván Ortolá	KTM	23	+15.618	6	4
13	99	(Spain) Carlos Tatay	CFMoto	23	+15.777	16	3
14	24	(Japan) Tatsuki Suzuki	Honda	23	+28.493	8	2
15	16	(Italy) Andrea Migno	Honda	23	+28.503	23	1
16	9	(Italy) Nicola Carraro	KTM	23	+28.545	17	
17	23	(Italy) Elia Bartolini	KTM	23	+28.818	20	
18	38	(Spain) David Salvador	KTM	23	+29.160	12	
19	77	(Italy) Filippo Farioli	Gas Gas	23	+29.402	19	
20	20	(France) Lorenzo Fellon	Honda	23	+29.454	22	
21	66	(Australia) Joel Kelso	KTM	23	+31.915	18	
22	5	(Spain) Jaume Masià	KTM	23	+36.482	31	
23	43	(Spain) Xavier Artigas	CFMoto	23	+36.526	15	
24	27	(Japan) Kaito Toba	KTM	23	+36.751	32	
25	95	(Spain) David Almansa	KTM	23	+42.091	21	
26	70	(United Kingdom) Joshua Whatley	Honda	23	+50.015	29	
27	64	(Indonesia) Mario Aji	Honda	23	+50.156	28	
28	22	(Spain) Ana Carrasco	KTM	23	+57.280	30	
29	67	(Italy) Alberto Surra	Honda	23	+57.360	26	
Ret	19	(United Kingdom) Scott Ogden	Honda	15	Accident	25	
Ret	72	(Japan) Taiyo Furusato	Honda	14	Accident	27	
Ret	54	(Italy) Riccardo Rossi	Honda	8	Accident	11	
Fastest lap: (Turkey) Deniz Öncü (KTM) – 1:38.790 (lap 2)
OFFICIAL MOTO3 RACE REPORT

== Championship standings after the race ==
Below are the standings for the top five riders, constructors, and teams after the round.

=== MotoGP ===
Riders' Championship standings

	Pos.	Rider	Points
	1	(Italy) Francesco Bagnaia	265
	2	(France) Fabio Quartararo	248
1	3	(Italy) Enea Bastianini	219
1	4	(Spain) Aleix Espargaró	212
	5	(Australia) Jack Miller	189

Constructors' Championship standings

	Pos.	Constructor	Points
	1	(Italy) Ducati	448
1	2	(Japan) Yamaha	256
1	3	(Italy) Aprilia	248
	4	(Austria) KTM	240
	5	(Japan) Suzuki	199

Teams' Championship standings

	Pos.	Team	Points
	1	(Italy) Ducati Lenovo Team	454
1	2	(Austria) Red Bull KTM Factory Racing	337
1	3	(Italy) Aprilia Racing	334
	4	(Italy) Prima Pramac Racing	318
	5	(Japan) Monster Energy Yamaha MotoGP	290

=== Moto2 ===
Riders' Championship standings

	Pos.	Rider	Points
	1	(Spain) Augusto Fernández	271.5
	2	(Japan) Ai Ogura	242
	3	(Spain) Arón Canet	200
	4	(Italy) Tony Arbolino	191.5
3	5	(Spain) Pedro Acosta	177

Constructors' Championship standings

Pos.	Constructor	Points
1	(Germany) Kalex	477.5
2	(Italy) Boscoscuro	200.5
3	(Italy) MV Agusta	5

Teams' Championship standings

Pos.	Team	Points
1	(Finland) Red Bull KTM Ajo	448.5
2	(Japan) Idemitsu Honda Team Asia	370
3	(Spain) Flexbox HP40	287
4	(Spain) Inde GasGas Aspar Team	258.5
5	(Belgium) Elf Marc VDS Racing Team	253.5

=== Moto3 ===
Riders' Championship standings

Pos.	Rider	Points
1	(Spain) Izan Guevara	319
2	(Spain) Sergio García	257
3	(Italy) Dennis Foggia	246
4	(Japan) Ayumu Sasaki	238
5	(Turkey) Deniz Öncü	200

Constructors' Championship standings

Pos.	Constructor	Points
1	(Spain) Gas Gas	389
2	(Japan) Honda	330
3	(Austria) KTM	323
4	(Sweden) Husqvarna	279
5	(China) CFMoto	130

Teams' Championship standings

Pos.	Team	Points
1	(Spain) Valresa GasGas Aspar Team	576
2	(Luxembourg) Leopard Racing	376
3	(Italy) Sterilgarda Husqvarna Max	340
4	(Finland) Red Bull KTM Ajo	280
5	(France) Red Bull KTM Tech3	251

Previous race: 2022 Malaysian Grand Prix	FIM Grand Prix World Championship; 2022 season	Next race: 2023 Portuguese Grand Prix
Previous race: 2021 Valencian Grand Prix	Valencian Community motorcycle Grand Prix	Next race: 2023 Valencian Grand Prix
