= Ai Ogura =

Japanese motorcycle racer

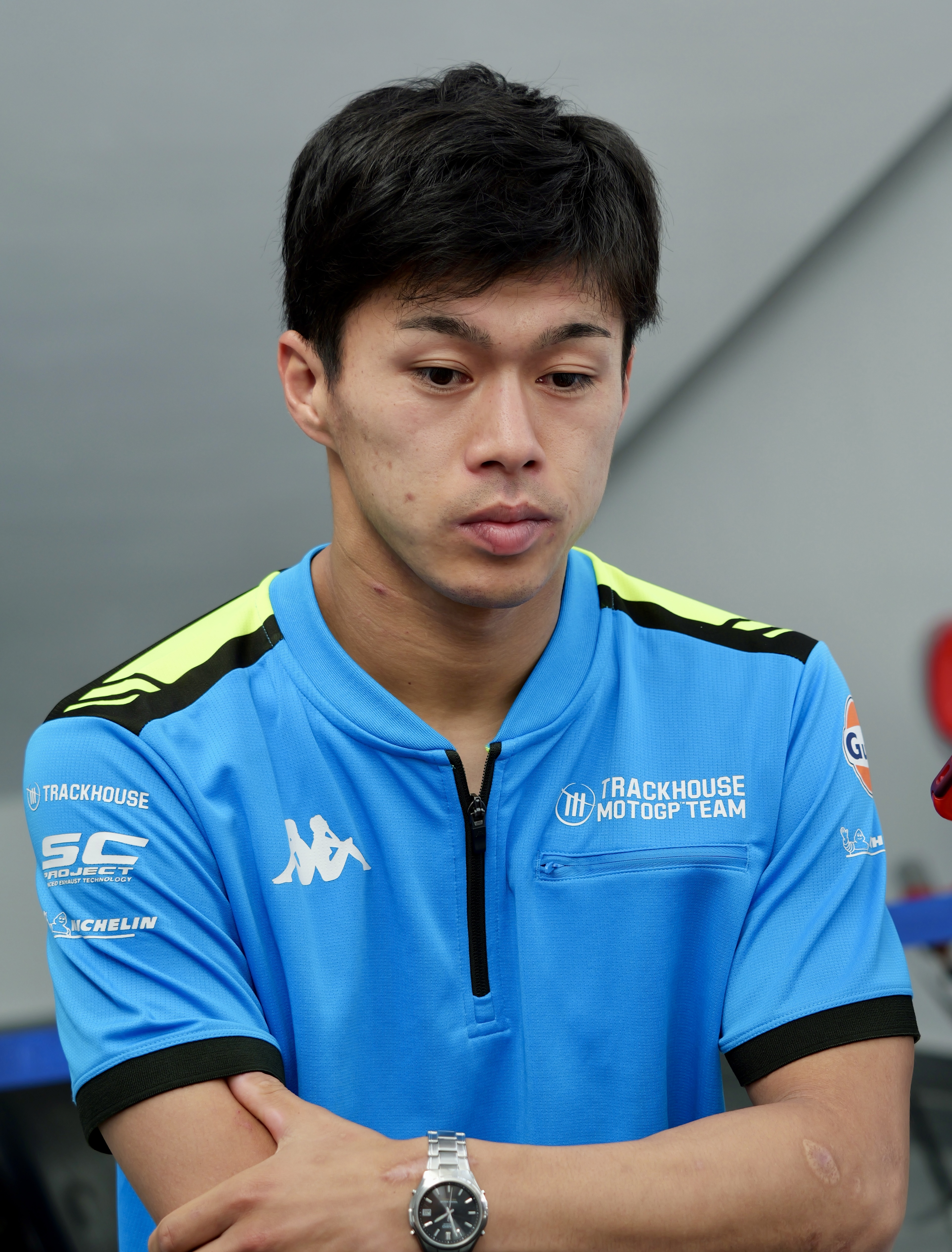
- Ogura at the 2026 Spanish Grand Prix
- Nationality: Japanese
- Born: 26 January 2001 (age 25); Kiyose, Tokyo, Japan
- Current team: Trackhouse MotoGP Team
- Bike number: 79
Motorcycle racing career statistics
MotoGP World Championship
Active years	2025–
Manufacturers	Aprilia
Championships	0
2025 championship position	16th (89 pts)
Starts / Wins / Podiums / Poles / F. laps / Points; 33 / 1 / 4 / 1 / 2 / 348
Moto2 World Championship
Active years	2021–2024
Manufacturers	Kalex (2021–2023); Boscoscuro (2024)
Championships	1 (2024)
2024 championship position	1st (274 pts)
Starts / Wins / Podiums / Poles / F. laps / Points; 74 / 6 / 19 / 5 / 3 / 773.5
Moto3 World Championship
Active years	2018–2020
Manufacturers	Honda
Championships	0
2020 championship position	3rd (170 pts)
Starts / Wins / Podiums / Poles / F. laps / Points; 37 / 0 / 8 / 1 / 2 / 280

Ai Ogura (Japanese: 小椋 藍, Hepburn: Ogura Ai; born 26 January 2001) is a Japanese Grand Prix motorcycle racer who competes in the MotoGP World Championship for Trackhouse MotoGP Team. He will leave Trackhouse at the end of the 2026 season to join Yamaha.

Ogura was crowned 2024 Moto2 World Champion with MT Helmets – MSi, being the first Japanese rider to win a world championship in fifteen years since Hiroshi Aoyama in 2009. He previously competed in Moto2 and Moto3 for Idemitsu Honda Team Asia, finishing as championship runner-up in 2022. Ogura is the first Asia Talent Cup graduate to make it to MotoGP. He won his maiden race at 2026 Dutch GP for Trackhouse.

== Career ==
=== Early career ===
Ogura was born in Kiyose, Japan. The son of a motorcycle enthusiast, Masaji, he rode a pocketbike for the first time at the age of three, and began participating in races at four years old. He stepped up to mini-bikes after turning nine.

Ogura was selected to participate in the second ever Asia Talent Cup season in 2015 at 14 years of age, where he clinched a win and three podiums.

For 2016, Ogura joined the Red Bull MotoGP Rookies Cup and finished on the podium in one race, ending 11th overall. He was given a second year in the Asia Talent Cup where he finished as runner-up. After his successful period in the Asia Talent Cup, he was given a seat in the Asia Talent Team by Honda in the FIM CEV Moto3 Junior World Championship, winning one race in Jerez. Ogura also took part in the 2017 Red Bull MotoGP Rookies Cup, earning five podiums in total, including two wins, despite missing several races due to an injury.

In 2018, Ogura participated in his last FIM CEV Moto3 Junior World Championship season, where he earned five podiums and a single win in Valencia.

=== Moto3 World Championship ===
==== Asia Talent Team (2018) ====
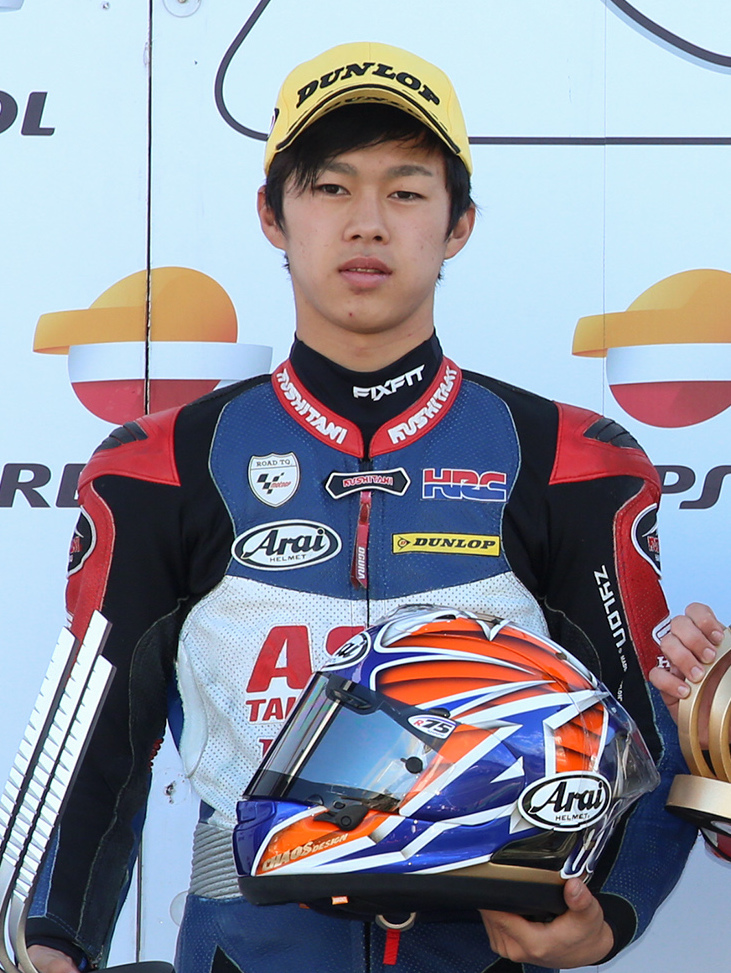
Ogura on the podium of the 2018 CEV Moto3 Valencia II race 2

Ogura made his Moto3 World Championship debut as a wildcard during the 2018 Spanish motorcycle Grand Prix, finishing 15th and scoring his maiden point. He made three more wildcard appearances, wherein two of them he finished outside the points, and crashed with three laps to go in the German Grand Prix after a collision with Gabriel Rodrigo when he was running ninth. He also participated in the FIM CEV Moto3 where he finished fifth in the standings.

==== Honda Team Asia (2019–2020) ====
Ogura signed with Honda Team Asia for the 2019 Moto3 World Championship alongside compatriot Kaito Toba, who had spent the previous two seasons with said team. He scored points in fourteen out of the nineteen races, and managed to finish second in the Aragon Grand Prix, it being his single podium and best result of the season. Ogura was coincidentally collected by Andrea Migno in both of the San Marino and Thai rounds in the very last lap while running fourth. He finished tenth in the standings with 109 points.

For the 2020 season, Ogura stayed in Honda Team Asia, teaming up with rookie Yuki Kunii, and managed to be consistent throughout the whole season reaching the podium in seven occasions. Ogura remained second in the standings for the most part of the season and took the championship battle with Tony Arbolino and Albert Arenas to the last round in Portugal, where the latter ended up taking the crown, while Ogura lost the second spot in the standings to Arbolino. His final position was third with a total of 170 points, with his best result being second in Jerez and Misano.

=== Moto2 World Championship ===
==== Idemitsu Honda Team Asia (2021–2023) ====
===== 2021 =====
In 2021, Ogura was promoted to Moto2, riding for Idemitsu Honda Team Asia alongside Thai Somkiat Chantra. In his rookie season, he managed to be in the top-ten in every race he finished except for the first round in Qatar. Ogura qualified in the front row twice at the Red Bull Ring in the Styrian and Austrian Grand Prix, and earned his single podium and best result of the season after finishing second in the latter round, where he managed to follow championship contender and fellow rookie Raúl Fernández until the last lap with only a 0.845 second gap separating each other at the finish line.

Ogura missed the Valencia round as a result of an injury sustained after crashing in the Algarve Grand Prix where he suffered a small left-foot fracture. He was beaten by Fernández to the rookie of the year award, who finished second in the standings. Meanwhile, Ogura ended up eighth with 120 points and managed to finish ahead of teammate Chantra.

===== 2022 =====
For 2022, Ogura remained in the Idemitsu Honda Team Asia, where he fought for the title until the last race. He started off the season achieving two podiums in the first four rounds in Argentina and COTA. Ogura was involved in a multi-rider crash in the Portuguese Grand Prix when he was running third after a rain shower unexpectedly hit part of the track resulting in unwarned riders losing control of their machines. He was able to pick up the bike and bring it to the pits but was not allowed to restart as five minutes had already passed after the red flag had been shown. He earned his first World Championship win in the sixth round in Jerez starting from pole position. After a third position in Mugello, Ogura was tied in points with then championship leader Celestino Vietti, and led the championship for the first time after the 13th round in Austria where he achieved his second pole and win, with a last lap battle involving teammate Chantra.

Ogura and Augusto Fernández took the title fight to the last rounds, wherein Ogura earned his home win in Motegi and got the championship lead back after the Australian round. With two rounds left and heading to the Malaysian Grand Prix, he held a 3.5 point lead gap to Fernández but lost it due to a crash in the last lap after taking the race lead from Tony Arbolino. Ogura ultimately lost the championship to Fernández after crashing in the last round in Valencia. He finished as championship runner-up with 242 points.

===== 2023 =====
During the 2023 pre-season training in Spain, Ogura suffered a broken wrist which ruled him out of the first two rounds in Portugal and Argentina. He started the season in COTA, and earned three podiums in total, one being second in his home race in Motegi. Ogura came ninth in the standings with 137.5 points.

On 15 September 2023, MT Helmets – MSi announced that Ogura would be joining their Moto2 project for the 2024 season alongside Sergio García. Two weeks later, HRC revealed that Ogura would stay linked with their program next season.

==== MT Helmets – MSi (2024) ====
===== 2024 =====
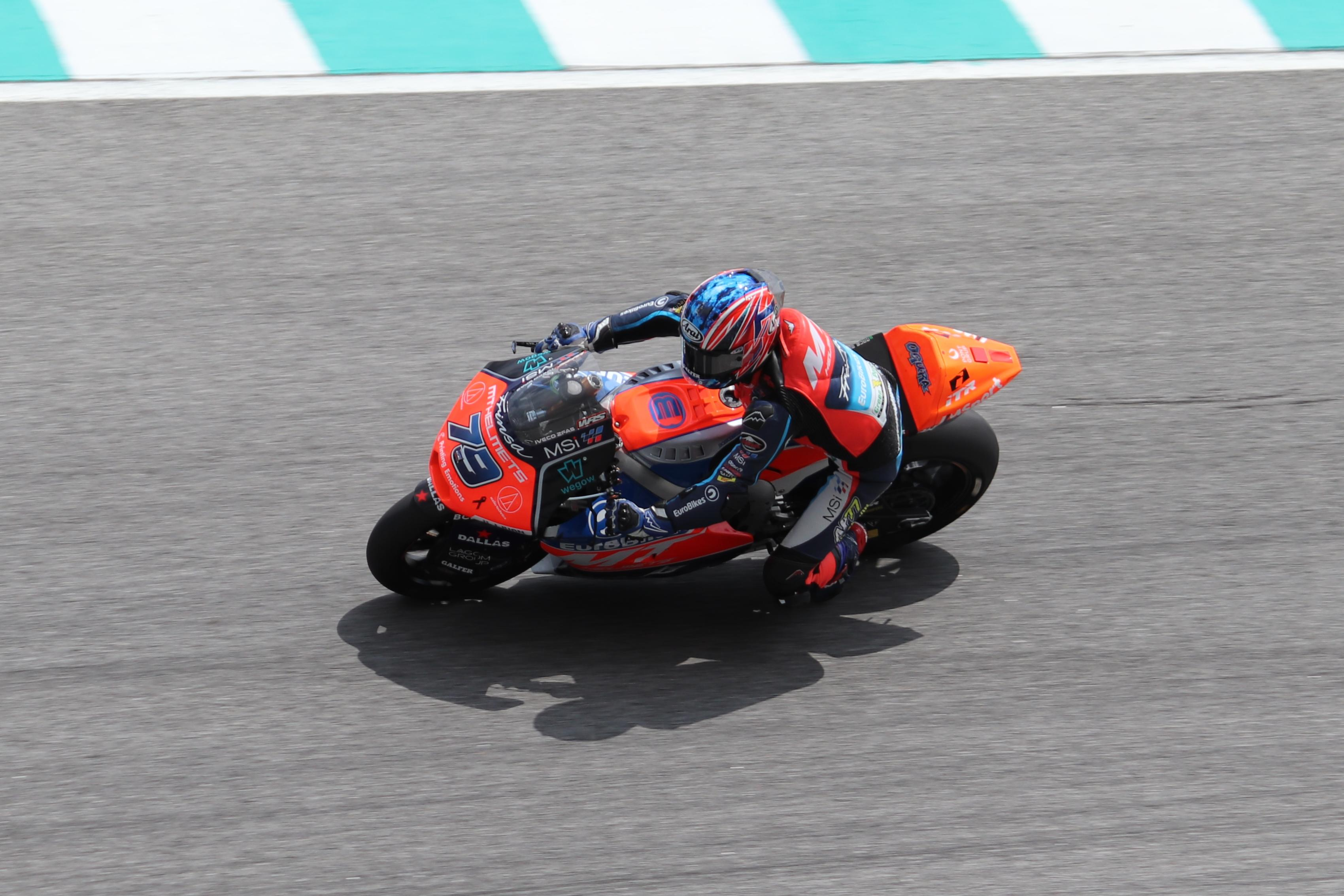
Ogura at the 2024 Malaysian Grand Prix

MT Helmets – MSi signed a deal with Boscoscuro to race with their chassis for the 2024 and 2025 seasons, which set a challenge for Ogura who had been racing on a Kalex frame for the past three seasons. He started the season with consistent performances edging the podium spots until Le Mans, where he finished second, and the next race in Barcelona where he got his first win of the season, in front of teammate and championship leader García. He won again in Assen and was third in Sachsenring.

On 15 August 2024, ahead of the Austrian Grand Prix, Trackhouse Racing announced that Ogura would be promoted to MotoGP in a two-year deal with the American team for the 2025 and 2026 seasons, alongside Raúl Fernández. This contractually marked the end of Ogura's career-long affiliation with Honda.

On the same weekend's Saturday Practice Ogura highsided exiting Turn 2's chicane, fracturing his right hand, which made him sit out of the Grand Prix. He went on to win the San Marino Grand Prix only three weeks after suffering his fracture, which placed him as championship leader for the first time. Ogura finished second in Indonesia and home race Motegi. He would then finish fourth in Australia and second in Thailand to secure the 2024 Moto2 World Riders' Championship in front of remaining championship contenders Canet, Aldeguer and García. He finished the season with a fourth position in the Solidarity Grand Prix, earning three wins and eight podiums in total.

=== MotoGP World Championship ===
==== Trackhouse Racing (2025–2026) ====
===== 2025 =====
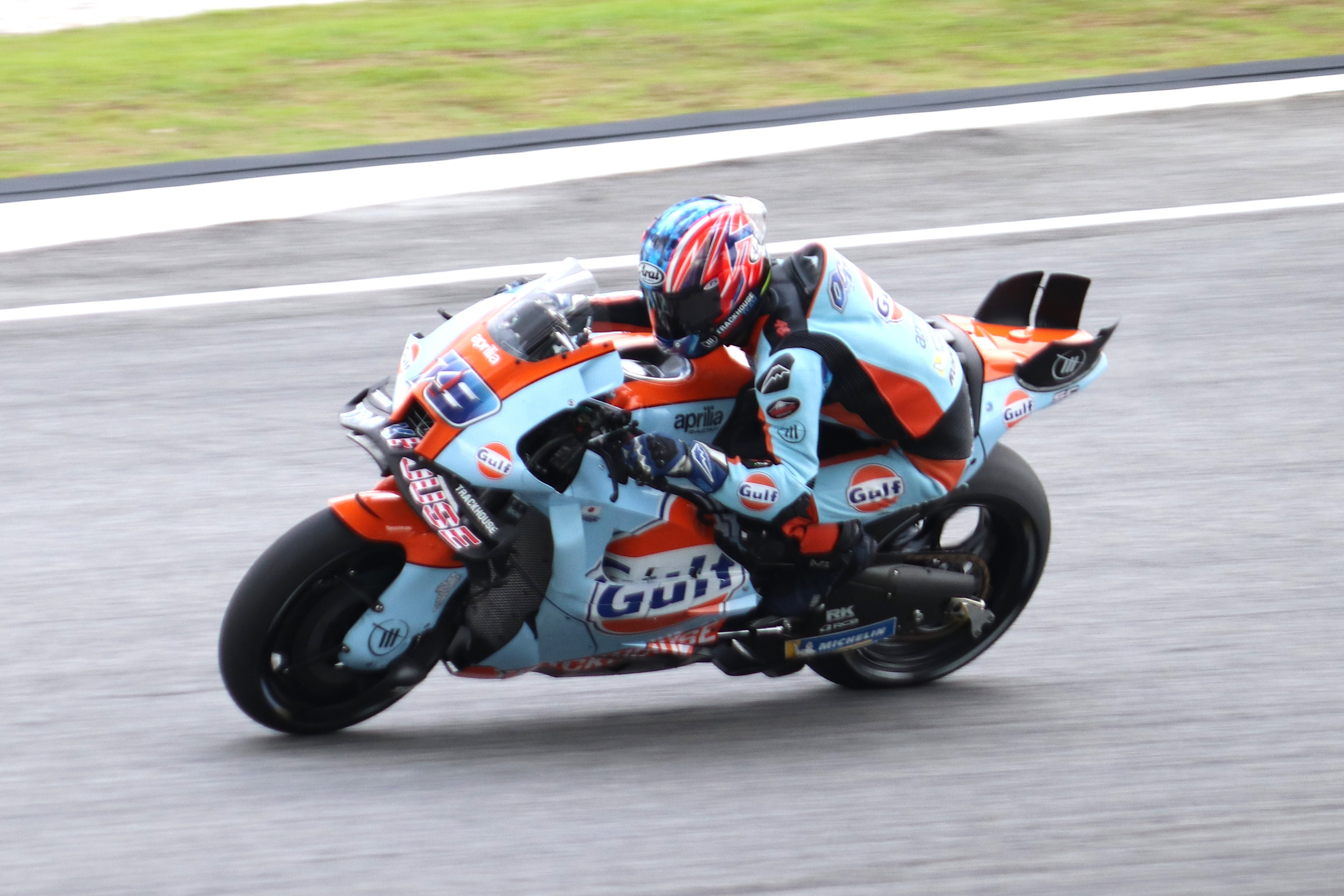
Ogura at the 2025 Malaysian Grand Prix

Ogura had an impressive debut weekend at the Thai Grand Prix. His Friday Practice lap pace was strong enough to secure a direct pass to Q2. In qualifying, he set the fifth fastest lap time which put him on the second row for the weekend's races. He finished fourth in the Sprint race and fifth in the Sunday race on his Aprilia RS-GP25. This was the best debut race result by a rookie since Marc Márquez's third place in Qatar 2013.

In the second round in Argentina, Ogura struggled to score points in the Sprint race but managed an eighth-place finish in the Sunday race. However, he was later disqualified for using a non-homologated software version on his bike, which had not been approved by the organization. It was later revealed that Trackhouse had to rebuild Ogura's bike with spare parts after a crash in Q1 that wrote off his RS-GP25. One of the components used was an unapproved firmware version from testing. Aprilia's technical director clarified how the software drew "zero" performance benefit.

During Friday's Free Practice at the British Grand Prix, Ogura fell at the exit of Turn 2. After a medical check, he was found to have a fracture in his right tibia and was consequently declared unfit to participate in the remainder of the weekend. He underwent a minor procedure on his leg, but after a medical evaluation ahead of the Aragon Grand Prix, he was advised not to return to racing yet. After nearly a month of recovery, he was ultimately given the medical clearance just before the start of the Italian Grand Prix. Ogura scored a few top ten finishes in the remainder of the season, including a sixth place at the Catalan Grand Prix. He would pick up another injury on his right hand—following a crash at the Misano race—which made him sit out his home race at Motegi, after a ninth place in the sprint race. He finished his rookie season in 16th place overall.

===== 2026 =====
Ogura faced his second year in MotoGP with Trackhouse, with two fifth place finishes in the first two rounds in Thailand and Brazil. During the third race at the United States Grand Prix, Ogura was running in fourth place and approaching podium positions when a technical issue forced him to retire from the race. On 24 April 2026, amid rider market rumors, Trackhouse team manager Davide Brivio revealed Ogura would not remain in the team after the 2026 season.

At the French Grand Prix, Ogura clinched his maiden MotoGP podium after finishing in third place in the Sunday race, which was Japan's first podium in the premier class in over 13 years. It also marked MotoGP's first all-Aprilia podium, with Martín and Bezzecchi in first and second place, respectively. At the Czech Grand Prix, he scored his maiden pole position and secured the all-time lap record around Brno with a lap time of 1:51.139. At the Dutch Grand Prix, a week after his maiden pole position, he scored his maiden victory over teammate Fernández and Jorge Martín, marking the first win for a Japanese rider in the premier class since Makoto Tamada at the 2004 Japanese Grand Prix.

Ogura missed the Aragon and San Marino Grand Prix after sustaining a thumb injury during training.

==== 2027 ====
On 1 July 2026, Yamaha announced Ogura would be racing for Yamaha Factory Racing in the 2027 and 2028 seasons, alongside Jorge Martín.

== Personal life ==
Ogura grew up in a racing family, where his father Masaji, an amateur motorcyclist, passed on his interest in motoracing. Ogura has explained how his father helped him with bike repairs and settings since he started racing with pocket bikes at the age of three. His older sister Karen is also a motorcycle racer, who has competed in MotoAmerica, All Japan Road Race Championship and Suzuka 4 hours.

Ogura's #79 racing number

Ogura has used the number 79 since joining the World Championship in 2019. He originally raced with the number 7 and was assigned the number 9 during his time in the Asia Talent Cup, leading him to combine the two. Since the beginning of his career, he has worn Daijiro Kato's number 74 on the right shoulder of his leathers, as well as Shoya Tomizawa's number 48 on the left, as tributes to both riders. Ogura has expressed that he sees both Kato and Tomizawa as key influences and sources of motivation in his career.

== Career statistics ==
=== Asia Talent Cup ===
==== Races by year ====
(key) (Races in bold indicate pole position; races in italics indicate fastest lap)

Year	Bike	1		2		3		4		5		6		Pos	Pts
Year	Bike	R1	R2	R1	R2	R1	R2	R1	R2	R1	R2	R1	R2	Pos	Pts
2015	Honda	THA; 10	THA; Ret	QAT; 12	QAT; 13	MAL; 6	MAL; Ret	CHN; 2	CHN; 1	JPN; 2	JPN; 4	SEP; Ret	SEP; 10	7th	107
2016	Honda	THA; 1	THA; 4	QAT; 2	QAT; 7	MAL; 5	MAL; Ret	CHN; 1	CHN; 3	JPN; 3	JPN; 1	SEP; 4	SEP; Ret	2nd	173

=== Red Bull MotoGP Rookies Cup ===
==== Races by year ====
(key) (Races in bold indicate pole position, races in italics indicate fastest lap)

Year	1	2	3	4	5	6	7	8	9	10	11	12	13	Pos	Pts
2016	JER1; Ret	JER2; 10	ASS1; 3	ASS2; Ret	SAC1; 11	SAC2; 19	RBR1; 12	RBR2; 11	BRN1; Ret	BRN2; 20	MIS; 9	ARA1; 11	ARA2; 4	11th	61
2017	**JER1**; 2	**JER2**; 4	ASS1	ASS2	SAC1	SAC2	BRN1; 19	BRN2; 11	**RBR1**; 1	**RBR2**; 3	MIS; 1	ARA1; 2	ARA2; 19	5th	124

=== FIM CEV Moto3 Junior World Championship ===
==== Races by year ====
(key) (Races in bold indicate pole position, races in italics indicate fastest lap)

Year	Bike	1	2	3	4	5	6	7	8	9	10	11	12	Pos	Pts
2017	Honda	ALB; Ret	LMS; 5	CAT1; Ret	CAT2; DNS	VAL1	VAL2	EST; 3	JER1; 12	JER1; 1	ARA; 8	VAL1; 8	VAL2; 5	8th	83
2018	Honda	EST; Ret	VAL1; Ret	VAL2; 3	FRA; 3	CAT1; 7	CAT2; 23	ARA; 4	JER1; Ret	JER2; 2	ALB; 7	VAL1; 1	VAL2; 2	5th	128

=== FIM Moto2 European Championship ===
==== By year ====
Year	Bike	1	2	3	4	5	6	7	8	9	10	11	Pos	Pts
2023	Kalex	EST1	EST2	VAL1; DNS	JER	POR1	POR2	CAT1	CAT2	ARA1	ARA2	VAL2	NC	0

=== Grand Prix motorcycle racing ===
==== By season ====
Season	Class	Motorcycle	Team	Race	Win	Podium	Pole	FLap	Pts	Plcd	WCh
2018	Moto3	Honda	Asia Talent Team	4	0	0	0	0	1	36th	0
2019	Moto3	Honda	Honda Team Asia	18	0	1	0	1	109	10th	0
2020	Moto3	Honda	Honda Team Asia	15	0	7	1	1	170	**3rd**	0
2021	Moto2	Kalex	Idemitsu Honda Team Asia	17	0	1	0	1	120	8th	0
2022	Moto2	Kalex	Idemitsu Honda Team Asia	20	3	7	3	1	242	**2nd**	0
2023	Moto2	Kalex	Idemitsu Honda Team Asia	18	0	3	0	0	137.5	9th	0
2024	Moto2	Boscoscuro	MT Helmets – MSi	19	3	8	2	1	274	**1st**	1
2025	MotoGP	Aprilia	Trackhouse MotoGP Team	18	0	0	0	0	89	16th	0
2026	MotoGP	Aprilia	Trackhouse MotoGP Team	15	1	4	1	2	259*	4th*	0
Total				**144**	**7**	**31**	**7**	**7**	**1401.5**		**1**

* Season still in progress.

==== By class ====
Class	Seasons	1st GP	1st pod	1st win	Race	Win	Podiums	Pole	FLap	Pts	WChmp
Moto3	2018–2020	2018 Spain	2019 Aragon		37	0	8	1	2	280	0
Moto2	2021–2024	2021 Qatar	2021 Austria	2022 Spain	74	6	19	5	3	773.5	1
MotoGP	2025–present	2025 Thailand	2026 France	2026 Dutch TT	33	1	4	1	2	348	0
Total	2018–present				**144**	**7**	**31**	**7**	**7**	**1401.5**	**1**

==== Races by year ====
(key) (Races in bold indicate pole position; races in italics indicate fastest lap; ^{superscript} indicates point-scoring sprint position)

Year	Class	Bike	1	2	3	4	5	6	7	8	9	10	11	12	13	14	15	16	17	18	19	20	21	22	Pos	Pts
2018	Moto3	Honda	QAT	ARG	AME	SPA; 15	FRA	ITA	CAT	NED; 23	GER; Ret	CZE	AUT; 20	GBR	RSM	ARA	THA	JPN	AUS	MAL	VAL				36th	1
2019	Moto3	Honda	QAT; 11	ARG; 17	AME; 11	SPA; 9	FRA; Ret	ITA	CAT; 6	NED; 6	GER; 7	CZE; 6	AUT; 12	GBR; 10	RSM; Ret	ARA; 2	THA; Ret	JPN; 14	AUS; 14	MAL; 4	VAL; 10				10th	109
2020	Moto3	Honda	QAT; 3	SPA; 2	ANC; Ret	CZE; 3	AUT; 4	STY; 3	**RSM**; 2	EMI; 3	CAT; 11	FRA; 9	ARA; 14	TER; 9	EUR; 3	VAL; 8	POR; 8								3rd	170
2021	Moto2	Kalex	QAT; 17	DOH; 5	POR; Ret	SPA; 7	FRA; 7	ITA; 6	CAT; Ret	GER; Ret	NED; 6	STY; 5	AUT; 2	GBR; 9	ARA; 8	RSM; 7	AME; 7	EMI; 9	ALR; Ret	VAL					8th	120
2022	Moto2	Kalex	QAT; 6	INA; 6	ARG; 3	AME; 2	POR; Ret	**SPA**; 1	FRA; 5	ITA; 3	CAT; 7	GER; 8	NED; 2	GBR; 4	**AUT**; 1	RSM; 5	ARA; 4	JPN; 1	THA; 6^{‡}	AUS; 11	**MAL**; Ret	VAL; Ret			2nd	242
2023	Moto2	Kalex	POR	ARG; DNS	AME; 15	SPA; Ret	FRA; 9	ITA; 15	GER; 14	NED; 2	GBR; 8	AUT; 3	CAT; 7	RSM; 5	IND; 21	JPN; 2	INA; 17	AUS; 15^{‡}	THA; 5	MAL; 4	QAT; 4	VAL; 11			9th	137.5
2024	Moto2	Boscoscuro	QAT; 4	POR; 5	AME; 7	SPA; 6	FRA; 2	CAT; 1	ITA; 5	NED; 1	GER; 3	**GBR**; 14	AUT; DNS	ARA; 8	RSM; 1	EMI; 4	INA; 2	JPN; 2	AUS; 4	**THA**; 2	MAL; Ret	SLD; 4			1st	274
2025	MotoGP	Aprilia	THA; 5^{4}	ARG; DSQ	AME; 9^{9}	QAT; 15^{7}	SPA; 8	FRA; 10	GBR; DNS	ARA	ITA; 10	NED; Ret	GER; Ret	CZE; 14	AUT; 14	HUN; 11	CAT; 6^{9}	RSM; Ret	JPN; DNS^{9}	INA	AUS; 13	MAL; 10	POR; 7	VAL; Ret^{9}	16th	89
2026	MotoGP	Aprilia	THA; 5^{4}	BRA; 5^{5}	USA; Ret^{6}	SPA; 5	FRA; 3^{7}	CAT; 8^{8}	ITA; 4^{8}	HUN; 4	**CZE**; 2^{2}	NED; 1^{2}	GER; 2^{4}	GBR; Ret^{2}	ARA	RSM	AUT; 4^{4}	JPN; 6^{5}	INA; 4^{2}	AUS; C	MAL	QAT	POR	VAL	5th*	259*

^{‡} Half points awarded as less than two thirds (2022 Thailand GP)/less than half (2023 Australian GP) of the race distance (but at least three full laps) was completed.
* Season still in progress.
