= 2026 FIM Stock European Championship =

Edition of a motorsport season

2026 FIM Stock European Championship
Previous:	2025	Next:	2027
Support series: Moto2 European Championship; FIM Moto3 Junior World Championship; Moto4 European Cup

The 2026 FIM Stock European Championship was the fourth season of the FIM Stock European Championship class. The season was held over 7 meetings, beginning on 24 May at Catalunya and ending on 18 October at Misano.

French rider Lorenzo Fellon won the championship in the final round at Misano, riding for SF Racing.

== Entry list ==
The provisional entry list was announced on 13 February 2026. It was later updated on 23 March 2026.

2026 entry list
Team	Constructor	No.	Rider	Rounds
(Portugal) Rosa Competicion - MCL	Honda	58	(Portugal) Martim Jesus	1–2, 4
(Spain) Team Honda LaGlisse	Honda	19	(Italy) Gabriele Giannini	7
(Spain) Team Honda LaGlisse	Honda	38	(Norway) Ola Granshagen	1–2
(Spain) Team Honda LaGlisse	Honda	72	(Spain) Yeray Ruiz	All
(Spain) Team Honda LaGlisse	Honda	84	(Colombia) Juanes Rivera	6
(Spain) VP3 Racing by Ilusion Racing	Honda	3	(Greece) Vasilis Panteleakis	All
(Poland) Wójcik Racing Team	Honda	7	(Poland) Mateusz Molik	1–4, 7
(Poland) Wójcik Racing Team	Honda	59	(Poland) Bartosz Bambecki	1–2, 4–7
(Spain) Aipar	Yamaha	95	(Mexico) Ricardo Rodriguez	1–2
(France) BRS - Brechon Racing School	Yamaha	13	(France) Matthias Rostagni	1–5, 7
(France) CIP Green Power Junior Team	Yamaha	26	(Italy) Cristian D'Arliano	1–4, 6–7
(Spain) Da Corsa Racing Team (Spain) Junior Team Da Corsa	Yamaha	75	(India) Sarthak Chavan	1–6
(Spain) Da Corsa Racing Team (Spain) Junior Team Da Corsa	Yamaha	84	(Colombia) Juanes Rivera	1, 3
(Italy) Face Racing	Yamaha	11	(Italy) Filippo Fuligni	All
(Italy) Face Racing	Yamaha	34	(Spain) Jacobo Hinojosa	All
(Italy) Face Racing	Yamaha	51	(Italy) Emanuele Andrenacci	All
(Spain) GV Tamoil Racing	Yamaha	8	(Spain) Jordi Losada	1–4
(Spain) GV Tamoil Racing	Yamaha	12	(Venezuela) Juan Pablo Telo	5
(Spain) GV Tamoil Racing	Yamaha	21	(Spain) Roberto Blázquez	6–7
(Spain) GV Tamoil Racing	Yamaha	32	(Colombia) Alfonso Linares	1–2
(Spain) GV Tamoil Racing	Yamaha	62	(Spain) Blai Trias	All
(Spain) GV Tamoil Racing	Yamaha	90	(Italy) Filippo Orlandi	5–7
(Spain) IUM Motorsports	Yamaha	17	(Ukraine) Tymur Kostin	1
(Spain) IUM Motorsports	Yamaha	25	(Hungary) Bence Kecskés	All
(Spain) IUM Motorsports	Yamaha	38	(Norway) Ola Granshagen	3–6
(Spain) IUM Motorsports	Yamaha	49	(Italy) Giacomo Baratti	7
(Spain) IUM Motorsports	Yamaha	74	(Spain) Marcos Ludeña	7
(Spain) IUM Motorsports	Yamaha	96	(Spain) Francisco Ruiz	1
(Spain) IUM Motorsports	Yamaha	97	(South Africa) Diego de Ponte	2, 5
(Spain) JDO Racing Team	Yamaha	54	(Spain) Adrián Torrelo	5–6
(Spain) JDO Racing Team	Yamaha	84	(Colombia) Juanes Rivera	5
(Spain) Lodisna Team Torrentó	Yamaha	22	(United States) Daniel Lanuza	All
(Spain) Lodisna Team Torrentó	Yamaha	23	(Belgium) Lorenzo Pontillo	All
(Spain) MDR Competición	Yamaha	29	(Italy) Cristian Lolli	All
(Spain) MDR Competición	Yamaha	35	(Spain) Miguel Bernal	All
(Spain) MDR Competición	Yamaha	37	(Spain) David Jiménez	All
(Spain) Promoracing Factory Team	Yamaha	76	(Portugal) Gonçalo Capote	2–7
(Spain) Promoracing Factory Team	Yamaha	91	(Japan) Kotaro Uchiumi	All
(Spain) PS Racing	Yamaha	43	(Spain) Luis Miguel López	1
(Spain) PS Racing	Yamaha	57	(Germany) Mitja Borgelt	1
(Germany) Ravenol Motorsport By Planam	Yamaha	36	(Germany) Felix Kauertz	7
(Germany) Ravenol Motorsport By Planam	Yamaha	57	(Germany) Mitja Borgelt	3–7
(Portugal) Rosa Competicion - MCL	Yamaha	60	(Portugal) Isaac Rosa	1–4
(Italy) RC113 Reparto Corse	Yamaha	90	(Italy) Filippo Orlandi	1–4
(Italy) SF Racing	Yamaha	5	(France) Lorenzo Fellon	All
(Spain) Top Surface Aspar Team	Yamaha	31	(Spain) Alberto García	1–6
(Italy) Zivimotor	Yamaha	27	(Spain) Álvaro Díaz	1–3
(Italy) Zivimotor	Yamaha	73	(Italy) Jacopo Cretaro	4–7

== Calendar ==
The provisional calendar was released on 18 September 2025.The calendar was later updated on 12 November 2025.

Round	Circuit	Date	Map of circuit locations
1	(Spain) Circuit de Barcelona, Montmeló	22–24 May	2026 FIM Stock European Championship is located in Europe
2	(Portugal) Circuito do Estoril, Alcabideche	12–14 June	2026 FIM Stock European Championship is located in Europe
3	(Spain) Circuito de Jerez, Jerez de la Frontera	3–5 July	2026 FIM Stock European Championship is located in Europe
4	(France) Circuit de Nevers Magny-Cours, Magny-Cours	24–26 July	2026 FIM Stock European Championship is located in Europe
5	(Spain) Circuit Ricardo Tormo, Cheste	4–6 September	2026 FIM Stock European Championship is located in Europe
6	(Spain) MotorLand Aragón, Alcañiz	25–27 September	2026 FIM Stock European Championship is located in Europe
7	(Italy) Misano World Circuit, Misano Adriatico	16–18 October	2026 FIM Stock European Championship is located in Europe

== Race results ==
round	Date	Circuit	Pole position	Fastest lap	Race winner	Winning team	Winning Constructor
1	24 May	(Spain) Catalunya	(Spain) Blai Trias	(Spain) Blai Trias	(Spain) Blai Trias	(Spain) GV Tamoil Racing	(Japan) Yamaha
2	14 June	(Portugal) Estoril	(Spain) Miguel Bernal	(Spain) Blai Trias	(Spain) Yeray Ruiz	(Spain) Team Honda LaGlisse	(Japan) Honda
3	5 July	(Spain) Jerez	(Spain) Blai Trias	(Italy) Filippo Fuligni	(Spain) Jacobo Hinojosa	(Italy) Face Racing	(Japan) Yamaha
4	26 July	(France) Magny-Cours	(Spain) Miguel Bernal	(Italy) Jacopo Cretaro	(France) Lorenzo Fellon	(Italy) SF Racing	(Japan) Yamaha
5	6 September	(Spain) Valencia	(France) Lorenzo Fellon	(Spain) Yeray Ruiz	(France) Lorenzo Fellon	(Italy) SF Racing	(Japan) Yamaha
6	27 September	(Spain) Aragón	(Spain) Yeray Ruiz	(Spain) David Jiménez	(Italy) Jacopo Cretaro (Note: Jacobo Hinojosa originally won the race, but later received a 3-second penalty for overtaking under yellow flags. David Jiménez, who was originally classified in second, was disqualified due to a technical infringement. As a result, Jacopo Cretaro, initially classified third, thus inherited the win.)	(Italy) Zivimotor	(Japan) Yamaha
7	18 October	(Italy) Misano	(Spain) Blai Trias	(Spain) Jacobo Hinojosa	(Spain) Jacobo Hinojosa	(Italy) Face Racing	(Japan) Yamaha

== Championship standings ==
Scoring system
Points are awarded to the top fifteen finishers. A rider has to finish the race to earn points.

Position	1st	2nd	3rd	4th	5th	6th	7th	8th	9th	10th	11th	12th	13th	14th	15th
Points	25	20	16	13	11	10	9	8	7	6	5	4	3	2	1

=== Riders' championship ===
Pos.	Rider	Bike	CAT (Spain)	EST (Portugal)	JER (Spain)	MAG (France)	VAL (Spain)	ARA (Spain)	MIS (Italy)	Points
1	(France) Lorenzo Fellon	Yamaha	3	5	7	1	1^{P}	2	5	117
2	(Spain) Yeray Ruiz	Honda	2	1	5	5	4^{F}	8^{P}	2	108
3	(Spain) Jacobo Hinojosa	Yamaha	8	4	1	Ret	2	5	1^{F}	102
4	(Spain) Blai Trias	Yamaha	1^{P F}	3^{F}	Ret^{P}	6	6	4	4^{P}	87
5	(Spain) Alberto García	Yamaha	5	6	3	4	3	Ret		66
6	(Italy) Jacopo Cretaro	Yamaha				2^{F}	7	1	6	64
7	(Spain) Miguel Bernal	Yamaha	7	2^{P}	Ret	3^{P}	13	Ret	8	56
8	(Spain) David Jiménez	Yamaha	9	7	2	9	Ret	DSQ^{F}	22	43
9	(Germany) Mitja Borgelt	Yamaha	15		11	10	5	3	12	43
10	(Italy) Cristian Lolli	Yamaha	10	9	9	7	18	6	Ret	39
11	(Italy) Filippo Fuligni	Yamaha	4	8	Ret^{F}	13	10	10	Ret	36
12	(Hungary) Bence Kecskés	Yamaha	Ret	10	10	Ret	12	7	9	32
13	(Portugal) Gonçalo Capote	Yamaha		Ret	8	12	Ret	9	10	25
14	(Colombia) Juanes Rivera	Yamaha	6		15		8			24
14	(Colombia) Juanes Rivera	Honda						11		24
15	(Spain) Álvaro Díaz	Yamaha	13	12	4					20
16	(Belgium) Lorenzo Pontillo	Yamaha	12	22	20	8	11	Ret	Ret	17
17	(Spain) Marcos Ludeña	Yamaha							3	16
18	(India) Sarthak Chavan	Yamaha	Ret	Ret	6	Ret	14	18		12
19	(France) Matthias Rostagni	Yamaha	Ret	14	12	14	Ret		14	10
20	(Italy) Gabriele Giannini	Honda							7	9
21	(Japan) Kotaro Uchiumi	Yamaha	Ret	Ret	18	Ret	Ret	12	11	9
22	(Italy) Emanuele Andrenacci	Yamaha	WD	15	21	16	9	Ret	Ret	8
23	(Poland) Mateusz Molik	Honda	17	16	14	11			16	7
24	(Spain) Jordi Losada	Yamaha	18	11	Ret	19				5
25	(Colombia) Alfonso Linares	Yamaha	11	Ret						5
26	(Italy) Filippo Orlandi	Yamaha	14	19	13	18	Ret	17	20	5
27	(Spain) Adrián Torrelo	Yamaha					17	13		3
28	(South Africa) Diego de Ponte	Yamaha		13			DNS			3
29	(Germany) Felix Kauertz	Yamaha							13	3
30	(Greece) Vasilis Panteleakis	Honda	16	21	17	17	16	14	18	2
31	(Poland) Bartosz Bambecki	Honda	Ret	17		15	Ret	16	19	1
32	(United States) Daniel Lanuza	Yamaha	20	18	16	Ret	15	20	23	1
33	(Spain) Roberto Blázquez	Yamaha						15	17	1
34	(Italy) Cristian D'Arliano	Yamaha	19	20	19	Ret		Ret	15	1
35	(Norway) Ola Granshagen	Honda	23	24						0
35	(Norway) Ola Granshagen	Yamaha			22	21	19	19		0
36	(Portugal) Isaac Rosa	Yamaha	22	25	23	20				0
37	(Ukraine) Tymur Kostin	Yamaha	21							0
38	(Italy) Giacomo Baratti	Yamaha							21	0
39	(Portugal) Martim Jesus	Honda	Ret	23		Ret				0
40	(Mexico) Ricardo Rodriguez	Yamaha	Ret	26						0
	(Venezuela) Juan Pablo Telo	Yamaha					Ret			0
	(Spain) Luis Miguel López	Yamaha	DNS							
	(Spain) Francisco Ruiz	Yamaha	WD							
Pos.	Rider	Bike	CAT (Spain)	EST (Portugal)	JER (Spain)	MAG (France)	VAL (Spain)	ARA (Spain)	MIS (Italy)	Points

Colour	Result
Gold	Winner
Silver	Second place
Bronze	Third place
Green	Points classification
Blue	Non-points classification
Blue	Non-classified finish (NC)
Purple	Retired, not classified (Ret)
Red	Did not qualify (DNQ)
Red	Did not pre-qualify (DNPQ)
Black	Disqualified (DSQ)
White	Did not start (DNS)
White	Withdrew (WD)
White	Race cancelled (C)
Blank	Did not practice (DNP)
Blank	Did not arrive (DNA)
Blank	Excluded (EX)

P – Pole position
F – Fastest lap
