= 2022 Malaysian motorcycle Grand Prix =

Nineteenth round of the 2022 Grand Prix motorcycle racing season

(Malaysia) 2022 Malaysian Grand Prix
Race details
- Race 19 of 20 races in the 2022 Grand Prix motorcycle racing season
- Date: 23 October 2022
- Official name: Petronas Grand Prix of Malaysia
- Location: Sepang International Circuit; Sepang, Selangor, Malaysia
- Course: Permanent racing facility; 5.543 km (3.444 mi)

MotoGP
Pole position
Rider	(Spain) Jorge Martín	Ducati
Time	1:57.790	
Fastest lap
Rider	(Spain) Jorge Martín	Ducati
Time	1:59.634 on lap 2	
Podium
First	(Italy) Francesco Bagnaia	Ducati
Second	(Italy) Enea Bastianini	Ducati
Third	(France) Fabio Quartararo	Yamaha

Moto2
Pole position
Rider	(Japan) Ai Ogura	Kalex
Time	2:06.405	
Fastest lap
Rider	(Italy) Tony Arbolino	Kalex
Time	2:07.132 on lap 5	
Podium
First	(Italy) Tony Arbolino	Kalex
Second	(Spain) Alonso López	Boscoscuro
Third	(United Kingdom) Jake Dixon	Kalex

Moto3
Pole position
Rider	(Italy) Dennis Foggia	Honda
Time	2:11.411	
Fastest lap
Rider	(Japan) Ayumu Sasaki	Husqvarna
Time	2:12.671 on lap 3	
Podium
First	(United Kingdom) John McPhee	Husqvarna
Second	(Japan) Ayumu Sasaki	Husqvarna
Third	(Spain) Sergio García	Gas Gas

The 2022 Malaysian motorcycle Grand Prix (officially known as the Petronas Grand Prix of Malaysia) was the nineteenth round of the 2022 Grand Prix motorcycle racing season. It was held at the Sepang International Circuit in Sepang on 23 October 2022.

The Grand Prix returns to Malaysia after absences in 2020 and 2021 in response to the COVID-19 pandemic.

In the MotoGP class, the Ducati Lenovo Team secured the Teams' Championship, their second consecutive and third overall.

== Background ==
=== Riders' entries ===
In the MotoGP class, Tetsuta Nagashima continues to replace Takaaki Nakagami in the LCR Honda, given the latter's finger injury from which he has not recovered. In the Moto2 class, Zonta van den Goorbergh missed the round after suffering a broken left wrist during FP1 of the Australian race. RW Racing GP replaced him with Azroy Anuar from the Asia Road Racing Championship. Jorge Navarro also missed the round after suffering a fractured femur during the Australian race. He was replaced by Borja Gómez, riding for Flexbox HP40. Simone Corsi, from MV Agusta Forward Racing also missed the round after injuring his right little finger during the Australian race. He was replaced by David Sanchis. Winner of 4 Cub Prix Series, Kasma Daniel from Yamaha Team Asean who competed in Asia Road Racing Championship races as a wildcard for the Petronas MIE Racing RW. Barry Baltus missed the race due to the injury. In the Moto3 class, Nicola Carraro continues in his substitution in the QJmotor Avintia Racing Team against the injured Matteo Bertelle. Syarifuddin Azman dropped wildcard for the VisionTrack Racing Team.

== Free practice session ==
=== MotoGP ===
==== Combinated Free Practice 1-2-3 ====
The top ten riders (written in bold) qualified in Q2.

Fastest session lap

Pos.	No.	Biker	Constructor	Free practice times		
Pos.	No.	Biker	Constructor	FP1	FP2	FP3
1	89	**(Spain) Jorge Martín**	**Ducati**	1:59.986	2:10.572	1:58.583
2	72	**(Italy) Marco Bezzecchi**	**Ducati**	2:00.767	2:09.962	1:58.772
3	12	**(Spain) Maverick Viñales**	**Aprilia**	2:01.328	2:09.353	1:58.796
4	10	**(Italy) Luca Marini**	**Ducati**	2:00.733	2:09.825	1:58.806
5	36	**(Spain) Joan Mir**	**Suzuki**	1:59.951	2:09.749	1:58.920
6	23	**(Italy) Enea Bastianini**	**Ducati**	1:59.875	2:11.568	1:59.003
7	20	**(France) Fabio Quartararo**	**Yamaha**	2:00.543	2:09.753	1:59.067
8	42	**(Spain) Álex Rins**	**Suzuki**	1:59.576	2:09.960	1:59.126
9	41	**(Spain) Aleix Espargaró**	**Aprilia**	2:01.654	2:11.433	1:59.156
10	21	**(Italy) Franco Morbidelli**	**Yamaha**	2:00.771	2:09.390	1:59.167
11	63	(Italy) Francesco Bagnaia	Ducati	2.00.770	2:06.610	1:59.167
12	5	(France) Johann Zarco	Ducati	2:01.048	2:08.589	1:59.236
13	33	(South Africa) Brad Binder	KTM	1:59.479	2:10.485	1:59.322
14	43	(Australia) Jack Miller	Ducati	2:01.034	2:07.553	1:59.343
15	88	(Portugal) Miguel Oliveira	KTM	2:01.247	2:09.898	1:59.405
16	93	(Spain) Marc Márquez	Honda	1:59:623	2:10.411	1:59.618
17	73	(Spain) Alex Márquez	Honda	2:01.015	2:06.896	1:59.934
18	49	(Italy) Fabio Di Giannantonio	Ducati	2:00.552	2:10.604	1:59.952
19	35	(United Kingdom) Cal Crutchlow	Yamaha	2:01.251	2:05.710	1:59.999
20	87	(Australia) Remy Gardner	KTM	2:01.704	2:10.592	2:00.126
21	44	(Spain) Pol Espargaró	Honda	2:01.200	2:12.414	2:00.234
22	40	(South Africa) Darryn Binder	Yamaha	2.01.831	2:12.878	2:00.405
23	25	(Spain) Raúl Fernández	KTM	2:01.831	2:10.392	2:00.475
24	45	(Japan) Tetsuta Nagashima	Honda	2:02.866	2:10.639	2:01.208
OFFICIAL MOTOGP COMBINED FREE PRACTICE TIMES REPORT

==== Free Practice 4 ====
Fastest session lap

Pos.	No.	Biker	Constructor	
Pos.	No.	Biker	Constructor	Time results
1	72	(Italy) Marco Bezzecchi	Ducati	**1:59.925**
2	23	(Italy) Enea Bastianini	Ducati	1:59.996
3	89	(Spain) Jorge Martín	Ducati	2:00.021
4	42	(Spain) Álex Rins	Suzuki	2:00.289
5	63	(Italy) Francesco Bagnaia	Ducati	2:00.297
6	21	(Italy) Franco Morbidelli	Yamaha	2:00.319
7	20	(France) Fabio Quartararo	Yamaha	2:00.343
8	88	(Portugal) Miguel Oliveira	KTM	2:00.355
9	43	(Australia) Jack Miller	Ducati	2:00.480
10	36	(Spain) Joan Mir	Suzuki	2:00.490
11	12	(Spain) Maverick Viñales	Aprilia	2:00.508
12	5	(France) Johann Zarco	Ducati	2:00.510
13	41	(Spain) Aleix Espargaró	Aprilia	2:00.616
14	33	(South Africa) Brad Binder	KTM	2:00.620
15	93	(Spain) Marc Márquez	Honda	2:00.660
16	44	(Spain) Pol Espargaró	Honda	2:00.709
17	10	(Italy) Luca Marini	Ducati	2:00.781
18	40	(South Africa) Darryn Binder	Yamaha	2:00.784
19	35	(United Kingdom) Cal Crutchlow	Yamaha	2:00.913
20	49	(Italy) Fabio Di Giannantonio	Ducati	2:00.994
21	25	(Spain) Raúl Fernández	KTM	2:01.028
22	87	(Australia) Remy Gardner	KTM	2:01.029
23	73	(Spain) Álex Márquez	Honda	2:01.392
24	45	(Japan) Tetsuta Nagashima	Honda	2:01.540
OFFICIAL MOTOGP FREE PRACTICE NR.4 TIMES REPORT

=== Moto2 ===
==== Combinated Free Practice 1-2-3 ====
The top fourteen riders (written in bold) qualified in Q2.

Fastest session lap

Pos.	No.	Biker	Constructor	Free practice times		
Pos.	No.	Biker	Constructor	FP1	FP2	FP3
1	79	(Japan) **Ai Ogura**	**Kalex**	2:07.938	2:08.466	**2:06.635**
2	37	**(Spain) Augusto Fernández**	**Kalex**	**2:06.816**	2:08.357	2:07.177
3	14	**(Italy) Tony Arbolino**	**Kalex**	2:07.867	2:08.743	**2:07.039**
4	21	**(Spain) Alonso López**	**Boscoscuro**	2:08.695	2:08.642	**2:07.086**
5	96	**(United Kingdom)** **Jake Dixon**	**Kalex**	2:08.290	2:09.899	**2:07.292**
6	6	(United States) **Cameron Beaubier**	**Kalex**	2:10.014	2:16.249	**2:07.339**
7	54	**(Spain)** **Fermín Aldeguer**	**Boscoscuro**	2:08.314	2:08.304	**2:07.379**
8	40	**(Spain) Arón Canet**	**Kalex**	2:08.444	2:08.424	**2:07.443**
9	23	**(Germany) Marcel Schrötter**	**Kalex**	2:08.668	2:08.093	**2:07.441**
10	35	**(Thailand) Somkiat Chantra**	**Kalex**	2:08.191	2:08.521	**2:07.472**
11	51	**(Spain) Pedro Acosta**	**Kalex**	2:07.644	2:08.896	**2:07.472**
12	64	**(Netherlands) Bo Bendsneyder**	**Kalex**	2:09.264	2:26.506	**2:07.707**
13	18	**(Spain) Manuel González**	**Kalex**	2:08.763	2:07.879	**2:07.827**
14	75	**(Spain) Albert Arenas**	**Kalex**	2:08.116	2:09.936	**2:07.830**
15	12	(Czech Republic) Filip Salač	Kalex	2:08.589	2:09.765	**2:08.051**
16	19	(Italy) Lorenzo Dalla Porta	Kalex	2:08.592	2:09.755	**2:08.072**
17	13	(Italy) Celestino Vietti	Kalex	2:08.453	2:08.892	**2:08.087**
18	52	(Spain) Jeremy Alcoba	Kalex	2:08.453	2:10.659	**2:08.093**
19	28	(Italy) Niccolò Antonelli	Kalex	2:09.025	2:10.149	**2:08.425**
20	42	(Spain) Marcos Ramírez	MV Agusta	2:08.993	2:10.009	**2:08.650**
21	16	(United States) Joe Roberts	Kalex	2:08.737	2:11.040	**2:08.776**
22	72	(Spain) Borja Gómez	Kalex	2:10.153	2:10.123	**2:09.040**
23	4	(United States) Sean Dylan Kelly	Kalex	2:09.683	2:09.612	**2:09.135**
24	29	(Japan) Taiga Hada	Kalex	2:10.472	2:12.388	**2:09.386**
25	81	(Thailand) Keminth Kubo	Kalex	2:10.415	2:10.162	**2:09.664**
26	98	(Spain) David Sanchis	MV Agusta	2:10.711	2:10.281	**2:09.728**
27	61	(Italy) Alessandro Zaccone	Kalex	2:10.142	2:12.653	**2:09.851**
28	27	(Malaysia) Kasma Daniel	Kalex		2:12.071	**2:11.160**
29	20	(Malaysia) Azroy Anuar	Kalex	**2:11.216**	2:12.020	2:11.524
	22	(United Kingdom) Sam Lowes	Kalex	**2:09.235**	2:10.029	
	7	(Belgium) Barry Baltus	Kalex	2:09.593		
OFFICIAL MOTO2 COMBINED FREE PRACTICE TIMES REPORT

=== Moto3 ===
==== Combined Free Practice 1-2-3 ====
Fastest session lap

Pos.	No.	Biker	Constructor	Free practice times		
Pos.	No.	Biker	Constructor	FP1	FP2	FP3
1	7	**(Italy) Dennis Foggia**	**Honda**	**2:12.226**	2:12.348	2:13.307
2	71	**(Japan) Ayumu Sasaki**	**Husqvarna**	**2:12.296**	2:13.292	2:12.752
3	44	**(Spain) David Muñoz**	**KTM**	2:13.944	2:12.614	**2:12.418**
4	24	**(Japan) Tatsuki Suzuki**	**Honda**	2:13.131	2:14.209	**2:12.559**
5	28	**(Spain) Izan Guevara**	**Gas Gas**	2:13.092	2:13.799	**2:12.721**
6	11	**(Spain) Sergio García**	**Gas Gas**	2:13.357	2:13.593	**2:12.801**
7	5	**(Spain) Jaume Masià**	**KTM**	**2:12.851**	2:13.680	2:12.892
8	54	**(Italy) Riccardo Rossi**	**Honda**	2:12.990	2:15.190	**2:12.701**
9	10	**(Brazil) Diogo Moreira**	**KTM**	2:13.221	2:14.134	**2:13.020**
10	48	(Spain) **Iván Ortolá**	**KTM**	2:16.199	**2:13.038**	2:15.184
11	99	(Spain) **Carlos Tatay**	**CFMoto**	2:13.950	2:14.365	**2:13.063**
12	82	**(Italy) Stefano Nepa**	**KTM**	2:13.877	**2:13.066**	2:13.406
13	96	**(Spain)** **Daniel Holgado**	**KTM**	2:13.303	2:13.405	**2:13.111**
14	16	**(Italy)** **Andrea Migno**	**Honda**	2:13.868	**2:13.218**	2:13.487
15	6	(Japan) Ryusei Yamanaka	KTM	**2:13.292**	2:13.589	2:13.864
16	43	(Spain) Xavier Artigas	CFMoto	2:14.619	**2:13.442**	2:13.848
17	63	(Malaysia) Syarifuddin Azman	Honda	**2:13.448**	2:14.941	2:15.007
18	53	(Turkey) Deniz Öncü	KTM	2:13.716	2:14.154	**2:13.654**
19	31	(Spain) Adrián Fernández	KTM	2:14.839	**2:13.696**	2:13.900
20	20	(France) Lorenzo Fellon	Honda	2:14.512	2:14.863	**2:13.712**
21	17	(United Kingdom) John McPhee	Husqvarna	2:15.139	**2:13.755**	2:14.058
22	27	(Japan) Kaito Toba	KTM	2:14.780	2:14.485	**2:13.886**
23	9	(Italy) Nicola Carraro	KTM	2:14.596	2:15.042	**2:13.978**
24	23	(Italy) Elia Bartolini	KTM	2:14.136	2:14.479	**2:13.995**
25	66	(Australia) Joel Kelso	KTM	2:14.988	**2:14.060**	2:14.069
26	72	(Japan) Taiyo Furusato	Honda	2:15.516	2:14.284	**2:14.180**
27	19	(United Kingdom) Scott Ogden	Honda	2:14.544	2:14.515	**2:14.223**
28	70	(United Kingdom) Joshua Whatley	Honda	2:15.463	2:14.863	**2:14.588**
29	67	(Italy) Alberto Surra	Honda	2:15.357	**2:14.750**	2:14.773
30	64	(Indonesia) Mario Aji	Honda	**2:15.721**	2:15.741	2:15.775
31	22	(Spain) Ana Carrasco	KTM	2:16.032	**2:16.029**	2:16.576
OFFICIAL MOTO3 COMBINED FREE PRACTICE TIMES REPORT

== Qualifying ==
=== MotoGP ===
Fastest session lap

Pos.	No.	Biker	Constructor	Qualifying times		Final grid	Row
Pos.	No.	Biker	Constructor	Q1	Q2	Final grid	Row
1	89	(Spain) Jorge Martín	Ducati	Qualified in Q2	1:57.790	1	1
2	23	(Italy) Enea Bastianini	Ducati	Qualified in Q2	1:58.246	2	1
3	93	(Spain) Marc Márquez	Honda	1:58.878	1:58.454	3	1
4	72	(Italy) Marco Bezzecchi	Ducati	Qualified in Q2	1:58.490	4	2
5	42	(Spain) Álex Rins	Suzuki	Qualified in Q2	1:58.575	5	2
6	10	(Italy) Luca Marini	Ducati	Qualified in Q2	1:58.579	6	2
7	21	(Italy) Franco Morbidelli	Yamaha	Qualified in Q2	1:58.654	7	3
8	12	(Spain) Maverick Viñales	Aprilia	Qualified in Q2	1:58.766	8	3
9	63	(Italy) Francesco Bagnaia	Ducati	1:58.645	1:58.862	9	3
10	41	(Spain) Aleix Espargaró	Aprilia	Qualified in Q2	1:58.935	10	4
11	36	(Spain) Joan Mir	Suzuki	Qualified in Q2	1:59.145	11	4
12	20	(France) Fabio Quartararo	Yamaha	Qualified in Q2	1:59.215	12	4
13	33	(South Africa) Brad Binder	KTM	1:59.053	N/A	13	5
14	43	(Australia) Jack Miller	Ducati	1:59.064	N/A	14	5
15	35	(United Kingdom) Cal Crutchlow	Yamaha	1:59.256	N/A	15	5
16	49	(Italy) Fabio Di Giannantonio	Ducati	1:59.278	N/A	16	6
17	44	(Spain) Pol Espargaró	Honda	1:59.363	N/A	17	6
18	5	(France) Johann Zarco	Ducati	1:59.690	N/A	18	6
19	88	(Portugal) Miguel Oliveira	KTM	1:59.699	N/A	19	7
20	87	(Australia) Remy Gardner	KTM	1:59.803	N/A	20	7
21	73	(Spain) Álex Márquez	Honda	2:00.008	N/A	21	7
22	25	(Spain) Raúl Fernández	KTM	2:00.077	N/A	22	8
23	45	(Japan) Tetsuta Nagashima	Honda	2:00.803	N/A	23	8
24	40	(South Africa) Darryn Binder	Yamaha	2:10.717	N/A	24	8
OFFICIAL MOTOGP QUALIFYING RESULTS

=== Moto2 ===
Fastest session lap

Pos.	No.	Biker	Constructor	Qualifying times		Final grid	Row
Pos.	No.	Biker	Constructor	Q1	Q2	Final grid	Row
1	79	(Japan) Ai Ogura	Kalex	Qualified in Q2	2:06.405	1	1
2	14	(Italy) Tony Arbolino	Kalex	Qualified in Q2	2:06.488	2	1
3	40	(Spain) Arón Canet	Kalex	Qualified in Q2	2:06.652	3	1
4	96	(United Kingdom) Jake Dixon	Kalex	Qualified in Q2	2:06.701	4	2
5	18	(Spain) Manuel González	Kalex	Qualified in Q2	2:06.705	5	2
6	37	(Spain) Augusto Fernández	Kalex	Qualified in Q2	2:06.738	6	2
7	35	(Thailand) Somkiat Chantra	Kalex	Qualified in Q2	2:06.896	7	3
8	51	(Spain) Pedro Acosta	Kalex	Qualified in Q2	2:06.934	8	3
9	6	(United States) Cameron Beaubier	Kalex	Qualified in Q2	2:06.950	9	3
10	21	(Spain) Alonso López	Boscoscuro	Qualified in Q2	2:06.952	10	4
11	16	(United States) Joe Roberts	Kalex	2:07.062	2:07.011	11	4
12	64	(Netherlands) Bo Bendsneyder	Kalex	Qualified in Q2	2:07.096	12	4
13	75	(Spain) Albert Arenas	Kalex	Qualified in Q2	2:07.181	13	5
14	23	(Germany) Marcel Schrötter	Kalex	Qualified in Q2	2:07.203	14	5
15	19	(Italy) Lorenzo Dalla Porta	Kalex	2:07.204	2:07.281	15	5
16	54	(Spain) Fermín Aldeguer	Boscoscuro	Qualified in Q2	2:07.535	16	6
17	28	(Italy) Niccolò Antonelli	Kalex	2:07.670	2:08.248	17	6
18	12	(Czech Republic) Filip Salač	Kalex	2:08.148		18	6
19	52	(Spain) Jeremy Alcoba	Kalex	2:07.679	N/A	19	7
20	13	(Italy) Celestino Vietti	Kalex	2:07.711	N/A	20	7
21	42	(Spain) Marcos Ramírez	MV Agusta	2:07.893	N/A	21	7
22	29	(Japan) Taiga Hada	Kalex	2:08.055	N/A	22	8
23	81	(Thailand) Keminth Kubo	Kalex	2:08.148	N/A	23	8
24	98	(Spain) David Sanhcis	Kalex	2:08.350	N/A	24	8
25	4	(United States) Sean Dylan Kelly	Kalex	2:08.440	N/A	25	9
26	72	(Spain) Borja Gómez	MV Agusta	2:08.525	N/A	26	9
27	61	(Italy) Alessandro Zaccone	Kalex	2:08.686	N/A	27	9
28	20	(Malaysia) Azroy Anuar	Kalex	2:08.738	N/A	28	10
29	27	(Malaysia) Kasma Daniel	Kalex	2:09.641	N/A	29	10
OFFICIAL MOTO2 QUALIFYING RESULTS							10

=== Moto3 ===
Fastest session lap

Pos.	No.	Biker	Constructor	Qualifying times		Final grid	Row
Pos.	No.	Biker	Constructor	Q1	Q2	Final grid	Row
1	7	(Italy) Dennis Foggia	Honda	Qualified in Q2	2:11.411	1	1
2	28	(Spain) Izan Guevara	Gas Gas	Qualified in Q2	2:11.635	2	1
3	11	(Spain) Sergio García	Gas Gas	Qualified in Q2	2:11.674	3	1
4	5	(Spain) Jaume Masià	KTM	Qualified in Q2	2:11.751	4	2
5	96	(Spain) Daniel Holgado	KTM	Qualified in Q2	2:11.836	5	2
6	16	(Italy) Andrea Migno	Honda	Qualified in Q2	2:11.843	6	2
7	71	(Japan) Ayumu Sasaki	Husqvarna	Qualified in Q2	2:11.907	7	3
8	24	(Japan) Tatsuki Suzuki	Honda	Qualified in Q2	2:11.934	8	3
9	54	(Italy) Riccardo Rossi	Honda	Qualified in Q2	2:11.960	9	3
10	44	(Spain) David Muñoz	KTM	Qualified in Q2	2:12.051	10	4
11	10	(Brazil) Diogo Moreira	KTM	Qualified in Q2	2:12.136	11	4
12	82	(Italy) Stefano Nepa	KTM	Qualified in Q2	2:12.403	12	4
13	6	(Japan) Ryusei Yamanaka	KTM	2:12.632	2:12.432	13	5
14	48	(Spain) Iván Ortolá	KTM	Qualified in Q2	2:12.441	14	5
15	72	(Japan) Taiyo Furusato	Honda	2:12.819	2:12.517	15	5
16	66	(Australia) Joel Kelso	KTM	2:12.903	2:12.612	16	6
17	99	(Spain) Carlos Tatay	CFMoto	Qualified in Q2	2:13.362	17	6
18	27	(Japan) Kaito Toba	KTM	2:12.677	2:13.662	18	6
19	31	(Spain) Adrián Fernández	KTM	2:12.909	N/A	19	7
20	43	(Spain) Xavier Artigas	CFMoto	2:12.944	N/A	20	7
21	63	(Malaysia) Syarifuddin Azman	Honda	2:13.091	N/A	21	7
22	17	(United Kingdom) John McPhee	Husqvarna	2:13.240	N/A	22	8
23	9	(Italy) Nicola Carraro	KTM	2:13.241	N/A	23	8
24	23	(Italy) Elia Bartolini	KTM	2:13.403	N/A	24	8
25	53	(Turkey) Deniz Öncü	KTM	2:13.444	N/A	25	9
26	67	(Italy) Alberto Surra	Honda	2:13.471	N/A	26	9
27	20	(France) Lorenzo Fellon	Honda	2:13.585	N/A	27	9
28	22	(Spain) Ana Carrasco	KTM	2:14.031	N/A	28	10
29	64	(Indonesia) Mario Aji	Honda	2:14.260	N/A	29	10
30	19	(United Kingdom) Scott Ogden	Honda	2:14.802	N/A	30	10
31	70	(United Kingdom) Joshua Whatley	Honda	2:15.019	N/A	31	11
OFFICIAL MOTO3 QUALIFYING RESULTS							11

== Warm up practice ==
=== MotoGP ===
Johann Zarco set the best time and was the fastest rider.

=== Moto2 ===
Augusto Fernández finished at the top of the standings.

=== Moto3 ===
The first places in the ranking are occupied by Jaume Masià.

== Race ==
=== MotoGP ===
Pos.	No.	Biker	Team	Constructor	Laps	Time/Retired	Grid	Points
1	63	(Italy) Francesco Bagnaia	Ducati Lenovo Team	Ducati	20	40:14.332	9	25
2	23	(Italy) Enea Bastianini	Gresini Racing MotoGP	Ducati	20	+0.270	2	20
3	20	(France) Fabio Quartararo	Monster Energy Yamaha MotoGP	Yamaha	20	+2.773	12	16
4	72	(Italy) Marco Bezzecchi	Mooney VR46 Racing Team	Ducati	20	+5.446	4	13
5	42	(Spain) Álex Rins	Team Suzuki Ecstar	Suzuki	20	+11.923	5	11
6	43	(Australia) Jack Miller	Ducati Lenovo Team	Ducati	20	+13.472	14	10
7	93	(Spain) Marc Márquez	Repsol Honda Team	Honda	20	+14.304	3	9
8	33	(South Africa) Brad Binder	Red Bull KTM Factory Racing	KTM	20	+16.805	13	8
9	5	(France) Johann Zarco	Prima Pramac Racing	Ducati	20	+18.358	18	7
10	41	(Spain) Aleix Espargaró	Aprilia Racing	Aprilia	20	+21.591	10	6
11	21	(Italy) Franco Morbidelli	Monster Energy Yamaha MotoGP	Yamaha	20	+23.235 (Note: 3-second penalty for irresponsible riding.)	7	5
12	35	(United Kingdom) Cal Crutchlow	WithU Yamaha RNF MotoGP Team	Yamaha	20	+24.641	15	4
13	88	(Portugal) Miguel Oliveira	Red Bull KTM Factory Racing	KTM	20	+24.918	19	3
14	44	(Spain) Pol Espargaró	Repsol Honda Team	Honda	20	+25.586	17	2
15	25	(Spain) Raúl Fernández	Tech3 KTM Factory Racing	KTM	20	+27.039	22	1
16	12	(Spain) Maverick Viñales	Aprilia Racing	Aprilia	20	+30.427	8	
17	73	(Spain) Álex Márquez	LCR Honda Castrol	Honda	20	+33.322	21	
18	87	(Australia) Remy Gardner	Tech3 KTM Factory Racing	KTM	20	+33.691	20	
19	36	(Spain) Joan Mir	Team Suzuki Ecstar	Suzuki	20	+41.838	11	
Ret	40	(South Africa) Darryn Binder	WithU Yamaha RNF MotoGP Team	Yamaha	10	Accident	24	
Ret	49	(Italy) Fabio Di Giannantonio	Gresini Racing MotoGP	Ducati	10	Accident	16	
Ret	89	(Spain) Jorge Martín	Prima Pramac Racing	Ducati	6	Accident	1	
Ret	45	(Japan) Tetsuta Nagashima	LCR Honda Idemitsu	Honda	4	Accident	23	
Ret	10	(Italy) Luca Marini	Mooney VR46 Racing Team	Ducati	1	Ride-Height System	6	
Fastest lap: (Spain) Jorge Martín (Ducati) – 1:59.634 (lap 2)
OFFICIAL MOTOGP RACE REPORT

=== Moto2 ===
Pos.	No.	Biker	Constructor	Laps	Time/Retired	Grid	Points
1	14	(Italy) Tony Arbolino	Kalex	18	38:25.233	2	25
2	21	(Spain) Alonso López	Boscoscuro	18	+11.411	10	20
3	96	(United Kingdom) Jake Dixon	Kalex	18	+11.802	4	16
4	37	(Spain) Augusto Fernández	Kalex	18	+13.206	6	13
5	18	(Spain) Manuel González	Kalex	18	+14.770	5	11
6	23	(Germany) Marcel Schrötter	Kalex	18	+17.166	14	10
7	6	(United States) Cameron Beaubier	Kalex	18	+20.222	9	9
8	40	(Spain) Arón Canet	Kalex	18	+24.279	3	8
9	52	(Spain) Jeremy Alcoba	Kalex	18	+24.407	19	7
10	54	(Spain) Fermín Aldeguer	Boscoscuro	18	+24.482	16	6
11	12	(Czech Republic) Filip Salač	Kalex	18	+30.636	18	5
12	19	(Italy) Lorenzo Dalla Porta	Kalex	18	+33.595	15	4
13	75	(Spain) Albert Arenas	Kalex	18	+34.448	13	3
14	64	(Netherlands) Bo Bendsneyder	Kalex	18	+34.927	12	2
15	29	(Japan) Taiga Hada	Kalex	18	+43.757	22	1
16	81	(Thailand) Keminth Kubo	Kalex	18	+44.940	23	
17	42	(Spain) Marcos Ramírez	MV Agusta	18	+45.182	21	
18	4	(United States) Sean Dylan Kelly	Kalex	18	+48.818	25	
19	27	(Malaysia) Kasma Daniel	Kalex	18	+53.121	29	
20	72	(Spain) Borja Gómez	Kalex	18	+54.465	26	
21	28	(Italy) Niccolò Antonelli	Kalex	18	+54.812	17	
22	20	(Malaysia) Azroy Anuar	Kalex	18	+55.685	28	
Ret	79	(Japan) Ai Ogura	Kalex	17	Accident	1	
Ret	51	(Spain) Pedro Acosta	Kalex	9	Accident	8	
Ret	61	(Italy) Alessandro Zaccone	Kalex	9	Rider In Pain	27	
Ret	16	(United States) Joe Roberts	Kalex	8	Mechanical	11	
Ret	13	(Italy) Celestino Vietti	Kalex	5	Accident	20	
Ret	35	(Thailand) Somkiat Chantra	Kalex	1	Accident Damage	7	
Ret	98	(Spain) David Sanchis	MV Agusta	0	Accident	24	
WD	7	(Belgium) Barry Baltus	Kalex		Withdrew		
DNS	22	(United Kingdom) Sam Lowes	Kalex		Did not start		
Fastest lap: (Italy) Tony Arbolino (Kalex) – 2:07.132 (lap 5)
OFFICIAL MOTO2 RACE REPORT

- Barry Baltus was declared unfit to compete due to an ankle injury suffered in a collision with Arón Canet during FP1.

=== Moto3 ===
Pos.	No.	Biker	Constructor	Laps	Time/Retired	Grid	Points
1	17	(United Kingdom) John McPhee	Husqvarna	17	38:04.589	22	25
2	71	(Japan) Ayumu Sasaki	Husqvarna	17	+0.048	7	20
3	11	(Spain) Sergio García	Gas Gas	17	+0.146	3	16
4	5	(Spain) Jaume Masià	KTM	17	+0.245	4	13
5	10	(Brazil) Diogo Moreira	KTM	17	+0.319	11	11
6	7	(Italy) Dennis Foggia	Honda	17	+0.371	1	10
7	96	(Spain) Daniel Holgado	KTM	17	+5.817	5	9
8	6	(Japan) Ryusei Yamanaka	KTM	17	+6.034	13	8
9	48	(Spain) Iván Ortolá	KTM	23	+6.230	14	7
10	53	(Turkey) Deniz Öncü	KTM	17	+6.732	25	6
11	43	(Spain) Xavier Artigas	CFMoto	17	+6.789	20	5
12	28	(Spain) Izan Guevara	Gas Gas	17	+9.148	2	4
13	23	(Italy) Elia Bartolini	KTM	17	+13.416	24	3
14	16	(Italy) Andrea Migno	Honda	17	+13.682	6	2
15	23	(Spain) Adrián Fernández	KTM	17	+14.659	19	1
16	63	(Malaysia) Syarifuddin Azman	Honda	17	+14.812	21	
17	27	(Japan) Kaito Toba	KTM	17	+14.990	17	
18	66	(Australia) Joel Kelso	KTM	17	+20.530	15	
19	20	(France) Lorenzo Fellon	Honda	17	+28.240	27	
20	9	(Italy) Nicola Carraro	KTM	17	+28.285	23	
21	64	(Indonesia) Mario Aji	Honda	17	+43.055	29	
22	22	(Spain) Ana Carrasco	KTM	17	+43.250	28	
23	70	(United Kingdom) Joshua Whatley	Honda	17	+54.110	31	
Ret	72	(Japan) Taiyo Furusato	Honda	15	Accident	18	
Ret	54	(Italy) Riccardo Rossi	Honda	12	Accident	9	
Ret	99	(Spain) Carlos Tatay	CFMoto	12	Accident	16	
Ret	67	(Italy) Alberto Surra	Honda	8	Accident	26	
Ret	24	(Japan) Tatsuki Suzuki	Honda	4	Accident	8	
Ret	44	(Spain) David Muñoz	KTM	3	Accident	10	
Ret	82	(Italy) Stefano Nepa	KTM	1	Accident	12	
Ret	19	(United Kingdom) Scott Ogden	Honda	1	Accident	30	
Fastest lap: (Japan) Ayumu Sasaki (Husqvarna) – 2:12.671 (lap 3)
OFFICIAL MOTO3 RACE REPORT

== Championship standings after the race ==
Below are the standings for the top five riders, constructors, and teams after the round.

=== MotoGP ===
Riders' Championship standings

Pos.	Rider	Points
1	(Italy) Francesco Bagnaia	258
2	(France) Fabio Quartararo	235
3	(Spain) Aleix Espargaró	212
4	(Italy) Enea Bastianini	211
5	(Australia) Jack Miller	189

Constructors' Championship standings

Pos.	Constructor	Points
1	(Italy) Ducati	432
2	(Italy) Aprilia	248
3	(Japan) Yamaha	243
4	(Austria) KTM	220
5	(Japan) Suzuki	174

Teams' Championship standings

Pos.	Team	Points
1	(Italy) Ducati Lenovo Team	447
2	(Italy) Aprilia Racing	334
3	(Austria) Red Bull KTM Factory Racing	306
4	(Italy) Prima Pramac Racing	302
5	(Japan) Monster Energy Yamaha MotoGP	271

=== Moto2 ===
Riders' Championship standings

	Pos.	Rider	Points
1	1	(Spain) Augusto Fernández	251.5
1	2	(Japan) Ai Ogura	242
	3	(Spain) Arón Canet	200
2	4	(Italy) Tony Arbolino	175.5
1	5	(Italy) Celestino Vietti	165

Constructors' Championship standings

Pos.	Constructor	Points
1	(Germany) Kalex	452.5
2	(Italy) Boscoscuro	187.5
3	(Italy) MV Agusta	5

Teams' Championship standings

Pos.	Team	Points
1	(Finland) Red Bull KTM Ajo	403.5
2	(Japan) Idemitsu Honda Team Asia	370
3	(Spain) Flexbox HP40	283
4	(Spain) Inde GasGas Aspar Team	238.5
5	(Belgium) Elf Marc VDS Racing Team	230.5

=== Moto3 ===
Riders' Championship standings

Pos.	Rider	Points
1	(Spain) Izan Guevara	294
2	(Spain) Sergio García	241
3	(Italy) Dennis Foggia	233
4	(Japan) Ayumu Sasaki	227
5	(Turkey) Deniz Öncü	180

Constructors' Championship standings

Pos.	Constructor	Points
1	(Spain) Gas Gas	364
2	(Japan) Honda	317
3	(Austria) KTM	303
4	(Sweden) Husqvarna	268
5	(China) CFMoto	127

Teams' Championship standings

Pos.	Team	Points
1	(Spain) Gaviota GasGas Aspar Team	535
2	(Luxembourg) Leopard Racing	361
3	(Italy) Sterilgarda Husqvarna Max	324
4	(Finland) Red Bull KTM Ajo	274
5	(France) Red Bull KTM Tech3	221

== Notes ==
Previous race: 2022 Australian Grand Prix	FIM Grand Prix World Championship; 2022 season	Next race: 2022 Valencian Grand Prix
Previous race: 2019 Malaysian Grand Prix	Malaysian motorcycle Grand Prix	Next race: 2023 Malaysian Grand Prix
